= Dmytro Drahun =

Ukrainian cross-country skier

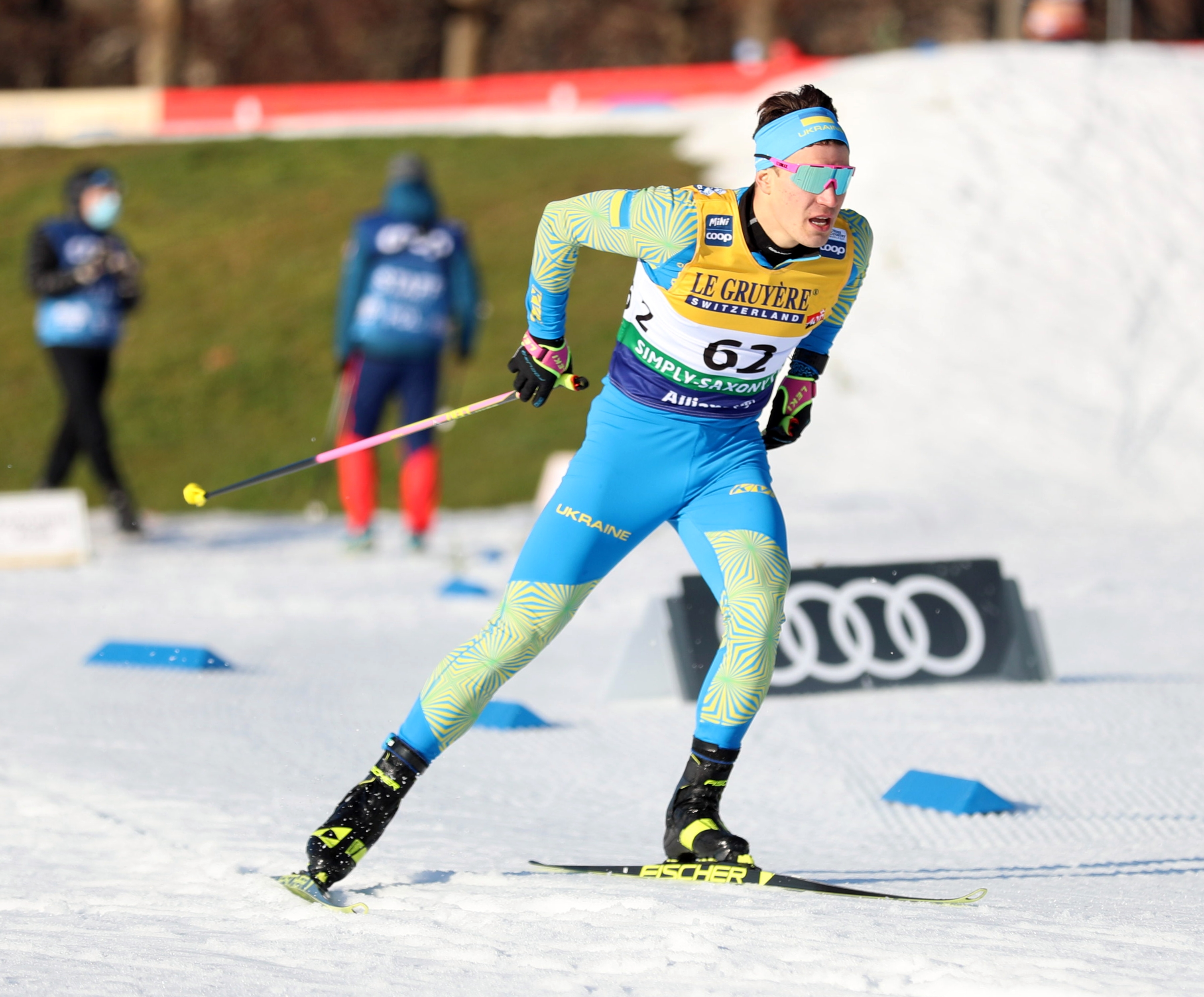
- Drahun in December 2020

Personal information
- Full name: Dmytro Mykolaiovych Drahun
- Born: 30 December 1997 (age 28)
- Height: 178 cm (5 ft 10 in)

Sport
- Sport: Skiing

World Cup career
- Seasons: 6 – (2021–)
- Indiv. podiums: 0
- Team podiums: 0
- Overall titles: 0
- Discipline titles: 0
- Updated on 1 March 2026

Dmytro Mykolaiovych Drahun (Ukrainian: Драгун Дмитро Миколайович; born 30 December 1997) is a cross-country skier from Ukraine. He represented Ukraine at the 2026 Winter Olympics.

He also competed as a guide of visually impaired athletes. At the 2026 Winter Paralympics, he was the guide for Iaroslav Reshetynskyi, who won silver in the sprint.

== Cross-country skiing results ==
All results are sourced from the International Ski Federation (FIS).

=== Olympic Games ===
Year	Age	15 km individual	30 km skiathlon	50 km mass start	Sprint	4 × 10 km relay	Team sprint
2026	28	71	59	43	60	—	23

=== World Championships ===
Year	Age	15/10 km individual	30/20 km skiathlon	50 km mass start	Sprint	4 × 10/7.5 km relay	Team sprint
2019	21	KQLF	—	—	98	14	—
2021	23	93	66	—	73	—	21
2023	25	68	48	—	57	—	24
2025	27	78	—	—	58	19	21

=== World Cup ===
==== Season standings ====
Season	Age	Discipline standings				Ski Tour standings				
Season	Age	Overall	Distance	Sprint	U23	Nordic Opening	Tour de Ski	Ski Tour 2020	World Cup Final	Ski Tour Canada
2021	23	NC	NC	NC	—N/a	—	—	—N/a	—N/a	—N/a
2022	24	NC	NC	NC	—N/a	—N/a	—	—N/a	—N/a	—N/a
2023	25	NC	NC	NC	—N/a	—N/a	—	—N/a	—N/a	—N/a
2024	26	NC	NC	NC	—N/a	—N/a	—	—N/a	—N/a	—N/a
2025	27	NC	NC	NC	—N/a	—N/a	—	—N/a	—N/a	—N/a

== Personal life ==
Drahun was born in Koriukivka Raion. He studied at the Brovary Higher School of Physical Education in Brovary. In 2016, he entered the National University of Ukraine on Physical Education and Sport, where he obtained both bachelor's and master's degrees.
