= JC Schoonmaker =

American cross-country skier (born 2000)

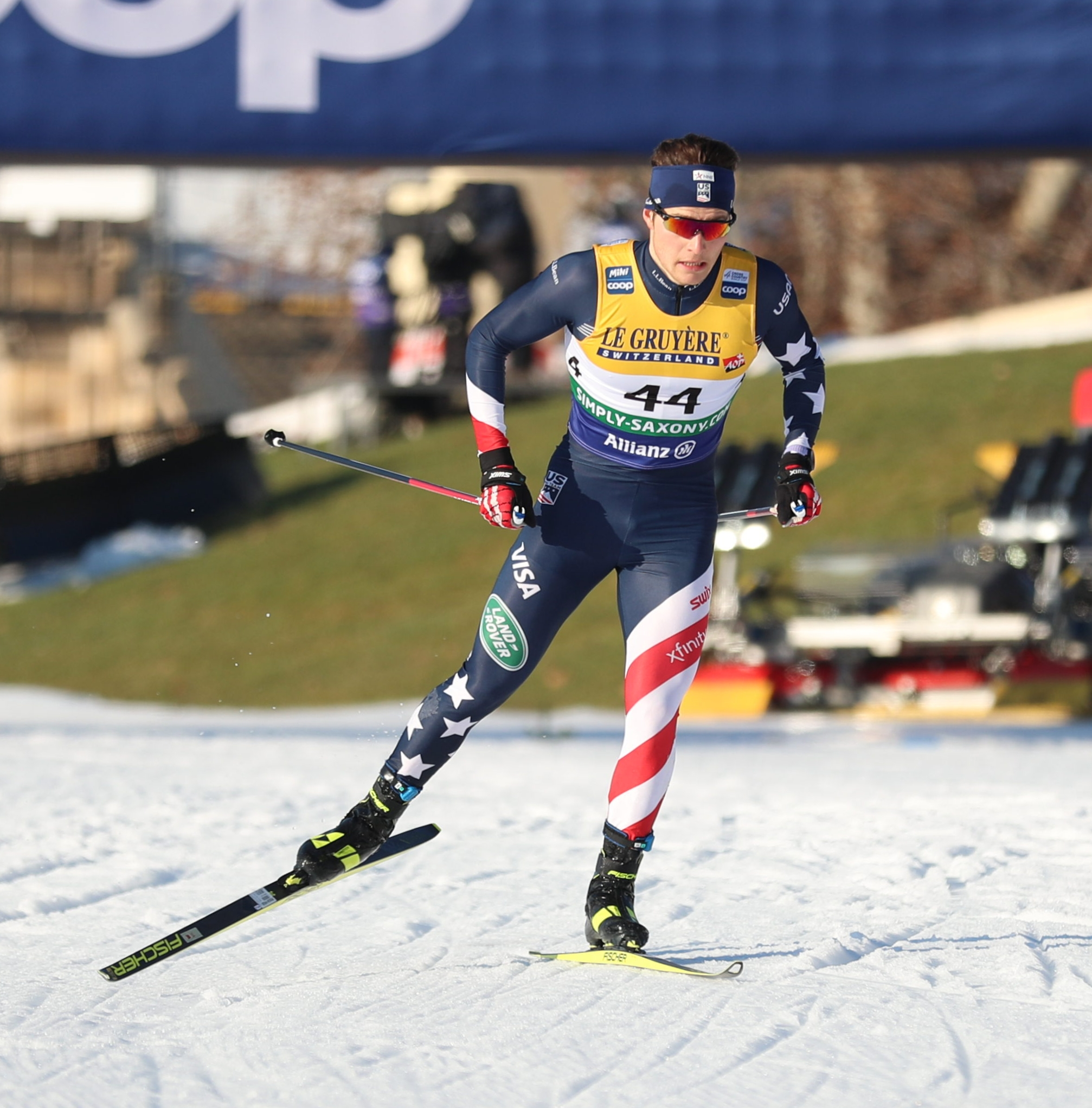
- Schoonmaker in 2020

Personal information
- Full name: James Clinton Schoonmaker
- Nationality: United States
- Born: August 12, 2000 (age 25) Truckee, California, U.S.

Sport
- Sport: Skiing
- Club: Sugar Bowl Ski Team and Academy

World Cup career
- Seasons: 5 – (2020–present)
- Indiv. starts: 27
- Indiv. podiums: 1
- Team starts: 6
- Team podiums: 0
- Overall titles: 0 – (35th in 2024)
- Discipline titles: 0
- Updated on December 9, 2023

James Clinton Schoonmaker (born April 12, 2000) is an American cross-country skier. He competed in the sprint at the 2022 Winter Olympics. He competes collegiately for the University of Alaska Anchorage.

== Cross-country skiing results ==
All results are sourced from the International Ski Federation (FIS).

=== Olympic Games ===
Year	Age	15 km individual	30 km skiathlon	50 km mass start	Sprint	4 × 10 km relay	Team sprint
2022	21	66	—	—^{[a]}	15	—	9

^{a} Distance reduced to 30 km due to weather conditions.

=== World Championships ===
Year	Age	15 km individual	30 km skiathlon	50 km mass start	Sprint	relay	Team sprint
2021	20	—	—	—	26	—	—
2023	22	—	—	—	9	—	10
2025	24			54	15	7	6

=== World Cup ===
==== Season standings ====
Season	Age	Discipline standings				Ski Tour standings			
Season	Age	Overall	Distance	Sprint	U23	Nordic Opening	Tour de Ski	Ski Tour 2020	World Cup Final
2020	19	151	—	94	14	—	—	—	—N/a
2021	20	76	NC	35	9	71	—	—N/a	—N/a
2022	21	45	97	19	4	—N/a	—	—N/a	—N/a
2023	22	71	NC	30	11	—N/a	DNF	—N/a	—N/a
2024	23	35	141	10	—N/a	—N/a	DNF	—N/a	—N/a

==== Individual podiums ====
- 0 victories – (0 SWC, 0 WC)
- 1 podiums – (1 WC, 0 SWC)

No.	Season	Date	Location	Race	Level	Place
1	2023–24	December 9, 2023	Östersund, Sweden	1.4 km Sprint C	World Cup	3rd
