= FIS Ski Tour 2020 =

Cross-country skiing competition

2019–20 FIS Cross-Country World Cup

Ski tour details
- Venue(s): Östersund, Sweden; Åre, Sweden; Meråker, Norway; Trondheim, Norway
- Dates: 15 February 2020 – 23 February 2020
- Stages: 6

Results
Men
Jersey awarded to the men's overall winner	Winner	Pål Golberg (NOR)
	Second	Simen Hegstad Krüger (NOR)
	Third	Hans Christer Holund (NOR)
Jersey awarded to the men's points classification winner	Points	Johannes Høsflot Klæbo (NOR)
Women
Jersey awarded to the women's overall winner	Winner	Therese Johaug (NOR)
	Second	Heidi Weng (NOR)
	Third	Ingvild Flugstad Østberg (NOR)
Jersey awarded to the women's points classification winner	Points	Therese Johaug (NOR)

The FIS Ski Tour 2020 was a cross-country skiing competition held as a part of the 2019–20 FIS Cross-Country World Cup. This stage event took place in Sweden and Norway, on ski resorts well-known from other skiing disciplines like alpine skiing or biathlon. The tour began in Östersund, Sweden on 15 February 2020 and concluded with the pursuit stage in Trondheim, Norway, on 23 February 2020. It consisted six stages, which were awarded with reduced number of World Cup points. For the overall standings they received three times the World Cup points compared to a regular individual World Cup event.

== Schedule ==
Stage	Venue	Date	Event	Technique	Distance		Start time (CET)	
Stage	Venue	Date	Event	Technique	Women	Men	Women	Men
1	Östersund (SWE)	15 February 2020	Distance, interval start	Freestyle	10 km	15 km	13:30	16:10
2	Östersund (SWE)	16 February 2020	Distance, pursuit	Classic	10 km	15 km	16:00	14:00
3	Åre (SWE)	18 February 2020	Uphill sprint	Freestyle	0.7 km	0.7 km	16:15	16:15
4	Meråker (NOR)	20 February 2020	Distance, mass start	Freestyle	34 km	34 km	11:00	13:30
5	Trondheim (NOR)	22 February 2020	Sprint	Classic	1.5 km	1.5 km	13:00	13:00
6	Trondheim (NOR)	23 February 2020	Distance, pursuit	Classic	15 km	30 km	11:15	13:20

== Overall leadership ==
Two main individual classifications were contested in the Ski Tour 2020. The most important was the overall standings, calculated by adding each skier's finishing times on each stage. Time bonuses (time subtracted) were awarded at both sprint stages and at intermediate points during mass start stage. In the sprint stages, thirty skiers were awarded with bonus seconds from 60 seconds for the winners, while on mass start stage the first ten skiers past the intermediate point received from 15 seconds to 1 seconds. The skier with the lowest cumulative time was the overall winner of the Ski Tour.

Bonus seconds for the top 30 positions by type
Type		1	2	3	4	5	6	7	8	9	10	11	12	13–15	16–20	21–25	26–30
In finish	Interval start	none															
In finish	Mass start	none															
In finish	Pursuit	none															
In finish	Sprint	60	54	48	46	44	42	32	30	28	26	24	22	10	8	6	4
Intermediate sprint	Mass start	15	12	10	8	6	5	4	3	2	1	none					

The second competition was the points standings. The skiers who received the highest number of points during the Tour won the points standings. The points available for each stage finish were determined by the stage's type. The leader was identified by a silver bib.

Points standings points for the top 10 positions by type
Type		1	2	3	4	5	6	7	8	9	10
In finish
In finish	Sprint	30	24	20	16	12	10	8	6	4	2
Intermediate sprint	Interval start (1st IT)	15	12	10	8	6	5	4	3	2	1
Intermediate sprint	Pursuit (1st IT)	15	12	10	8	6	5	4	3	2	1
Intermediate sprint	Mass start	15	12	10	8	6	5	4	3	2	1

A total of CHF 480,000, both genders included, were awarded in cash prizes in the race. The overall winners of the Ski Tour received CHF 47,000, with the second and third placed skiers getting CHF 33,840 and CHF 23,500 respectively. All finishers in the top 20 received money. The holders of the overall benefit on each stage they led; the final winners of the points standings earned CHF 6,000. CHF 3,000 was given to the winners of each stage of the race, with smaller amounts given to places 2 and 3.

Overall leadership by stage
Stage	Men			Women		
Stage	Winner	Overall standings	Points standings	Winner	Overall standings	Points standings
1	Sjur Røthe	Sjur Røthe	Federico Pellegrino	Therese Johaug	Therese Johaug	Therese Johaug
2	Pål Golberg	Pål Golberg	Federico Pellegrino	Therese Johaug	Therese Johaug	Frida Karlsson
3	Johannes Høsflot Klæbo	Pål Golberg	Federico Pellegrino	Therese Johaug	Therese Johaug	Therese Johaug
4	Alexander Bolshunov	Alexander Bolshunov	Federico Pellegrino	Therese Johaug	Therese Johaug	Therese Johaug
5	Johannes Høsflot Klæbo	Alexander Bolshunov	Johannes Høsflot Klæbo	Maiken Caspersen Falla	Therese Johaug	Therese Johaug
6	Emil Iversen	Pål Golberg	Johannes Høsflot Klæbo	Therese Johaug	Therese Johaug	Therese Johaug
Final		Pål Golberg	Johannes Høsflot Klæbo	Final	Therese Johaug	Therese Johaug

== Overall standings ==
Legend
Denotes the leader of the Overall standings	Denotes the leader of the Points standings

=== Overall standings ===
==== Men ====
Final overall standings (1–10)
Rank	Name	Time
1	Pål Golberg (NOR)	3:52:41.6
2	Simen Hegstad Krüger (NOR)	+28.9
3	Hans Christer Holund (NOR)	+30.1
4	Emil Iversen (NOR)	+32.3
5	Martin Løwstrøm Nyenget (NOR)	+32.9
6	Johannes Høsflot Klæbo (NOR)	+34.2
7	Alexander Bolshunov (RUS)	+1:41.0
8	Iivo Niskanen (FIN)	+1:48.2
9	Sjur Røthe (NOR)	+2:52.8
10	Dario Cologna (SUI)	+3:00.8

Final overall standings (11–30)
Rank	Name	Time
11	Finn Hågen Krogh (NOR)	+3:08.1
12	Evgeniy Belov (RUS)	+4:35.1
13	Francesco de Fabiani (ITA)	+5:37.6
14	Andrey Melnichenko (RUS)	+5:45.5
15	Roman Furger (SUI)	+5:47.7
16	Jens Burman (SWE)	+5:48.6
17	Andrey Larkov (RUS)	+6:45.3
18	Ivan Yakimushkin (RUS)	+7:15.5
19	Daniel Rickardsson (SWE)	+7:19.0
20	Clément Parisse (FRA)	+7:56.6
21	Denis Spitsov (RUS)	+8:25.8
22	Vitaliy Pukhkalo (KAZ)	+8:51.8
23	Erik Valnes (NOR)	+8:54.7
24	Artem Maltsev (RUS)	+9:26.8
25	Irineu Esteve Altimiras (AND)	+9:33.8
26	Johan Häggström (SWE)	+10:12.5
27	Karl-Johan Westberg (SWE)	+10:29.7
28	Marcus Ruus (SWE)	+10:53.3
29	Maurice Manificat (FRA)	+11:03.5
30	Jonas Baumann (SUI)	+11:03.8

==== Women ====
Final overall standings (1-10)
Rank	Name	Time
1	Therese Johaug (NOR)	3:00:41.8
2	Heidi Weng (NOR)	+3:40.8
3	Ingvild Flugstad Østberg (NOR)	+3:41.5
4	Ebba Andersson (SWE)	+5:54.3
5	Astrid Uhrenholdt Jacobsen (NOR)	+6:14.8
6	Jessie Diggins (USA)	+8:40.1
7	Krista Pärmäkoski (FIN)	+9:12.4
8	Tiril Udnes Weng (NOR)	+9:14.5
9	Emma Ribom (SWE)	+9:32.1
10	Sadie Maubet Bjornsen (USA)	+9:43.8

Final overall standings (11–30)
Rank	Name	Time
11	Teresa Stadlober (AUT)	+9:48.7
12	Rosie Brennan (USA)	+9:53.3
13	Ragnhild Haga (NOR)	+10:16.4
14	Lotta Udnes Weng (NOR)	+10:18.7
15	Charlotte Kalla (SWE)	+10:28.7
16	Delphine Claudel (FRA)	+11:36.8
17	Jonna Sundling (SWE)	+11:40.1
18	Laura Mononen (FIN)	+11:40.8
19	Anne Kyllönen (FIN)	+12:10.5
20	Nadine Fähndrich (SUI)	+12:12.8
21	Linn Sömskar (SWE)	+13:07.9
22	Alisa Zhambalova (RUS)	+13:13.5
23	Masako Ishida (JPN)	+13:21.4
24	Elisa Brocard (ITA)	+13:21.9
25	Julie Myhre (NOR)	+13:34.0
26	Chi Chunxue (CHN)	+14:00.6
27	Li Xin (CHN)	+14:07.8
28	Anna Nechaevskaya (RUS)	+14:33.1
29	Katherine Stewart-Jones (CAN)	+14:46.3
30	Julia Kern (USA)	+14:51.4

=== Points standings ===
==== Men ====
Final points standings (1–10)
Rank	Name	Total
1	Johannes Høsflot Klæbo (NOR)	92
2	Pål Golberg (NOR)	48
3	Emil Iversen (NOR)	35
4	Hans Christer Holund (NOR)	30
5	Finn Hågen Krogh (NOR)	30
6	Erik Valnes (NOR)	30
7	Simen Hegstad Krüger (NOR)	22
8	Martin Løwstrøm Nyenget (NOR)	20
9	Alexander Bolshunov (RUS)	18
10	Iivo Niskanen (FIN)	15

==== Women ====
Final points standings (1–10)
Rank	Name	Total
1	Therese Johaug (NOR)	76
2	Nadine Fähndrich (SUI)	59
3	Heidi Weng (NOR)	54
4	Jonna Sundling (SWE)	50
5	Astrid Uhrenholdt Jacobsen (NOR)	42
6	Linn Svahn (SWE)	29
7	Ebba Andersson (SWE)	26
8	Anna Dyvik (SWE)	22
9	Ingvild Flugstad Østberg (NOR)	14
10	Anna Svendsen (NOR)	12

== Stages ==
=== Stage 1 ===
15 February 2020, Östersund, Sweden

- No bonus seconds are awarded on this stage.

Men – 15 km Freestyle (individual)
Rank	Name	Time
1	Sjur Røthe (NOR)	30:41.5
2	Simen Hegstad Krüger (NOR)	+1.7
3	Finn Hågen Krogh (NOR)	+16.6
4	Martin Johnsrud Sundby (NOR)	+17.3
5	Alexander Bolshunov (RUS)	+22.2
6	Hans Christer Holund (NOR)	+24.6
7	Adrien Backscheider (FRA)	+25.4
8	Pål Golberg (NOR)	+27.6
9	Denis Spitsov (RUS)	+32.3
10	Ivan Yakimushkin (RUS)	+33.2
11	Martin Løwstrøm Nyenget (NOR)	+34.4
12	Andrey Melnichenko (RUS)	+35.1
13	Clément Parisse (FRA)	+38.8
14	Evgeniy Belov (RUS)	+39.3
15	Andrew Young (GBR)	+44.2
16	Andrey Larkov (RUS)	+52.6
17	Erik Valnes (NOR)	+53.7
18	Roman Furger (SUI)	+54.3
19	Dario Cologna (SUI)	+57.3
20	Jens Burman (SWE)	+58.7

Women – 10 km Freestyle (individual)
Rank	Name	Time
1	Therese Johaug (NOR)	21:49.7
2	Heidi Weng (NOR)	+45.6
3	Ingvild Flugstad Østberg (NOR)	+47.3
4	Ebba Andersson (SWE)	+53.1
5	Ragnhild Haga (NOR)	+1:04.3
6	Astrid Uhrenholdt Jacobsen (NOR)	+1:05.0
7	Krista Pärmäkoski (FIN)	+1:15.0
8	Jessie Diggins (USA)	+1:18.1
9	Rosie Brennan (USA)	+1:25.7
10	Natalya Nepryayeva (RUS)	+1:27.7
11	Teresa Stadlober (AUT)	+1:30.0
12	Tiril Udnes Weng (NOR)	+1:33.2
13	Charlotte Kalla (SWE)	+1:33.5
14	Emma Ribom (SWE)	+1:35.4
15	Delphine Claudel (FRA)	+1:37.1
16	Anamarija Lampič (SLO)	+1:42.5
17	Anna Comarella (ITA)	+1:44.6
18	Julie Myhre (NOR)	+1:45.8
19	Frida Karlsson (SWE)	+1:46.0
20	Elisa Brocard (ITA)	+1:50.1

=== Stage 2 ===
16 February 2020, Östersund, Sweden

- No bonus seconds are awarded on this stage.

Men – 15 km Classic (pursuit)
Rank	Name	Time
1	Pål Golberg (NOR)	34:50.8
2	Alexander Bolshunov (RUS)	+0.3
3	Martin Løwstrøm Nyenget (NOR)	+2.1
4	Sjur Røthe (NOR)	+2.5
5	Hans Christer Holund (NOR)	+7.3
6	Finn Hågen Krogh (NOR)	+39.3
7	Martin Johnsrud Sundby (NOR)	+42.9
8	Erik Valnes (NOR)	+51.3
9	Iivo Niskanen (FIN)	+54.4
10	Dario Cologna (SUI)	+54.7
11	Simen Hegstad Krüger (NOR)	+56.1
12	Ivan Yakimushkin (RUS)	+58.3
13	Roman Furger (SUI)	+59.6
14	Andrey Melnichenko (RUS)	+1:02.0
15	Denis Spitsov (RUS)	+1:05.7
16	Andrey Larkov (RUS)	+1:06.9
17	Evgeniy Belov (RUS)	+1.07.3
18	Andrew Young (GBR)	+1:32.2
19	Jens Burman (SWE)	+1:32.5
20	Sergey Ustiugov (RUS)	+1:40.5

Women – 10 km Classic (pursuit)
Rank	Name	Time
1	Therese Johaug (NOR)	27:29.0
2	Heidi Weng (NOR)	+57.4
3	Ingvild Flugstad Østberg (NOR)	+57.8
4	Ebba Andersson (SWE)	+58.6
5	Anamarija Lampič (SLO)	+1:38.7
6	Krista Pärmäkoski (FIN)	+1:39.4
7	Teresa Stadlober (AUT)	+1:40.0
8	Astrid Uhrenholdt Jacobsen (NOR)	+1:42.4
9	Emma Ribom (SWE)	+1:43.2
10	Rosie Brennan (USA)	+1:43.3
11	Jessie Diggins (USA)	+1:43.6
12	Natalya Nepryayeva (RUS)	+1:44.3
13	Frida Karlsson (SWE)	+1:44.8
14	Ragnhild Haga (NOR)	+1:49.1
15	Charlotte Kalla (SWE)	+1:49.8
16	Nadine Fähndrich (SUI)	+2:10.2
17	Linn Svahn (SWE)	+2:11.9
18	Masako Ishida (JPN)	+2:12.2
19	Sadie Maubet Bjornsen (USA)	+2:12.5
20	Kerttu Niskanen (FIN)	+2:13.0

=== Stage 3 ===
18 February 2020, Åre, Sweden

- Bonus seconds to the 30 skiers that qualifies for the quarter-finals, distributed as following:
  - Final: 60–54–48–46–44–42
  - Semi-final: 32–30–28–26–24–22
  - Quarter-final: 10–10–10–8–8–8–8–8–6–6–6–6–6–4–4–4–4–4

Men – 0.7 km Sprint Freestyle
Rank	Name	QT	Time	BS
1	Johannes Høsflot Klæbo (NOR)	1:49.64 (1)	2:02.63	60
2	Federico Pellegrino (ITA)	1:53.65 (4)	+2.39	54
3	Renaud Jay (FRA)	1:53.76 (5)	+3.70	48
4	Pål Golberg (NOR)	1:52.22 (2)	+14.46	46
5	Lucas Chanavat (FRA)	1:58.25 (24)	+26.39	44
6	Erik Valnes (NOR)	1:52.29 (3)	+1:05.62	42
7	Miha Šimenc (SLO)	1:58.37 (25)	SF	32
8	Alexander Bolshunov (RUS)	1:58.23 (23)	SF	30
9	James Clugnet (GBR)	1:54.89 (8)	SF	28
10	Denis Spitsov (RUS)	1:54.93 (9)	SF	26
11	Simen Hegstad Krüger (NOR)	1:55.60 (11)	SF	24
12	Valentin Chauvin (FRA)	1:58.05 (22)	SF	22

Women – 0.7 km Sprint Freestyle
Rank	Name	QT	Time	BS
1	Therese Johaug (NOR)	2:13.30 (1)	2:27.56	60
2	Heidi Weng (NOR)	2:17.83 (2)	+1.73	54
3	Astrid Uhrenholdt Jacobsen (NOR)	2:18.91 (6)	+2.47	48
4	Jonna Sundling (SWE)	2:20.70 (10)	+5.01	46
5	Nadine Fähndrich (SUI)	2:24.92 (22)	+6.22	44
6	Linn Svahn (SWE)	2:18.54 (4)	+6.98	42
7	Greta Laurent (ITA)	2:18.07 (3)	SF	32
8	Laura Mononen (FIN)	2:18.74 (5)	SF	30
9	Maiken Caspersen Falla (NOR)	2:20.01 (7)	SF	28
10	Ragnhild Haga (NOR)	2:20.45 (9)	SF	26
11	Jessie Diggins (USA)	2:24.10 (17)	SF	24
12	Sophie Caldwell (USA)	2:25.00 (23)	SF	22

=== Stage 4 ===
20 February 2020, Meråker, Norway

Men – 34 km Freestyle (mass start)
Rank	Name	Time	BS
1	Alexander Bolshunov (RUS)	1:19:34.9	18
2	Johannes Høsflot Klæbo (NOR)	+51.7	3
3	Emil Iversen (NOR)	+51.8	8
4	Martin Løwstrøm Nyenget (NOR)	+52.4	18
5	Finn Hågen Krogh (NOR)	+52.8	15
6	Dario Cologna (SUI)	+55.1	6
7	Sjur Røthe (NOR)	+55.2	27
8	Roman Furger (SUI)	+55.4	1
9	Simen Hegstad Krüger (NOR)	+55.5	8
10	Andrey Melnichenko (RUS)	+57.6	3
11	Hans Christer Holund (NOR)	+1:00.6	12
12	Pål Golberg (NOR)	+1:18.0	8
13	Evgeniy Belov (RUS)	+1:33.8	
14	Jens Burman (SWE)	+1:43.3	
15	Ivan Yakimushkin (RUS)	+1:44.4	
16	Andrew Young (GBR)	+1:47.4	
17	Denis Spitsov (RUS)	+1:47.6	
18	Snorri Einarsson (ISL)	+1:47.9	
19	Iivo Niskanen (FIN)	+1:50.7	
20	Martin Johnsrud Sundby (NOR)	+1:51.8	5

Women – 34 km Freestyle (mass start)0
Rank	Name	Time	BS
1	Therese Johaug (NOR)	1:26:32.8	30
2	Ingvild Flugstad Østberg (NOR)	+4.0	24
3	Heidi Weng (NOR)	+1:21.6	20
4	Ebba Andersson (SWE)	+2:00.5	16
5	Astrid Uhrenholdt Jacobsen (NOR)	+3:06.5	7
6	Tiril Udnes Weng (NOR)	+3:10.3	3
7	Jessie Diggins (USA)	+3:13.9	12
8	Emma Ribom (SWE)	+3:31.1	2
9	Teresa Stadlober (AUT)	+3:32.1	10
10	Rosie Brennan (USA)	+3:41.9	
11	Sadie Maubet Bjornsen (USA)	+3:44.8	2
12	Lotta Udnes Weng (NOR)	+4:02.5	
13	Elisa Brocard (ITA)	+4:02.8	
14	Ragnhild Haga (NOR)	+4:03.4	
15	Delphine Claudel (FRA)	+4:06.4	
16	Charlotte Kalla (SWE)	+4:26.9	2
17	Krista Pärmäkoski (FIN)	+4:31.4	4
18	Julie Myhre (NOR)	+6:04.2	
19	Julia Kern (USA)	+6:04.5	
20	Linn Sömskar (SWE)	+6:04.8	

==== Stage 4 bonus seconds ====
- Men: 2 intermediate sprints, bonus seconds to the 10 first skiers (15–12–10–8–6–5–4–3–2–1) past the intermediate point.
- Women: 2 intermediate sprints, bonus seconds to the 10 first skiers (15–12–10–8–6–5–4–3–2–1) past the intermediate point.
- No bonus seconds are awarded at the finish

Bonus seconds (Stage 4 – Men)
Name	Point 1	Point 2	Total
Sjur Røthe (NOR)	15	12	27
Alexander Bolshunov (RUS)	3	15	18
Martin Løwstrøm Nyenget (NOR)	8	10	18
Finn Hågen Krogh (NOR)	10	5	15
Hans Christer Holund (NOR)	12		12
Emil Iversen (NOR)		8	8
Simen Hegstad Krüger (NOR)	4	4	8
Pål Golberg (NOR)	8		8
Dario Cologna (SUI)		6	6
Martin Johnsrud Sundby (NOR)	5		5
Johannes Høsflot Klæbo (NOR)		3	3
Andrey Melnichenko (RUS)	1	2	3
Adrien Backscheider (FRA)	2		2
Roman Furger (SUI)		1	1

Bonus seconds (Stage 4 – Women)
Name	Point 1	Point 2	Total
Therese Johaug (NOR)	15	15	30
Ingvild Flugstad Østberg (NOR)	12	12	24
Heidi Weng (NOR)	10	10	20
Ebba Andersson (SWE)	8	8	16
Jessie Diggins (USA)	6	6	12
Teresa Stadlober (AUT)	5	5	10
Astrid Uhrenholdt Jacobsen (NOR)	3	4	7
Krista Pärmäkoski (FIN)	4		4
Tiril Udnes Weng (NOR)		3	3
Emma Ribom (SWE)		2	2
Sadie Maubet Bjornsen (USA)	1	1	2
Charlotte Kalla (SWE)	2		2

=== Stage 5 ===
22 February 2020, Trondheim, Norway

- Bonus seconds to the 30 skiers that qualifies for the quarter-finals, distributed as following:
  - Final: 60–54–48–46–44–42
  - Semi-final: 32–30–28–26–24–22
  - Quarter-final: 10–10–10–8–8–8–8–8–6–6–6–6–6–4–4–4–4–4

Men – 1.5 km Sprint Classic
Rank	Name	QT	Time	BS
1	Johannes Høsflot Klæbo (NOR)	2:52.80 (1)	2:52.07	60
2	Pål Golberg (NOR)	2:57.17 (6)	+1.20	54
3	Erik Valnes (NOR)	2:55.22 (2)	+1.60	48
4	Emil Iversen (NOR)	3:01.78 (14)	+5.79	46
5	Finn Hågen Krogh (NOR)	3:00.98 (13)	+18.91	44
6	Federico Pellegrino (ITA)	3:00.12 (8)	+22.78	42
7	Gleb Retivykh (RUS)	2:57.06 (5)	SF	32
8	Francesco De Fabiani (ITA)	3:04.15 (21)	SF	30
9	Lauri Vuorinen (FIN)	3:00.31 (9)	SF	28
10	Simen Hegstad Krüger (NOR)	3:00.69 (12)	SF	26
11	Johan Häggström (SWE)	2:55.72 (3)	SF	24
12	Alexander Bolshunov (RUS)	2:56.73 (4)	SF	22

Women – 1.5 km Sprint Classic
Rank	Name	QT	Time	BS
1	Maiken Caspersen Falla (NOR)	3:29.15 (12)	3:15.55	60
2	Jonna Sundling (SWE)	3:22.75 (1)	+0.48	54
3	Nadine Fähndrich (SUI)	3:27.21 (5)	+2.88	48
4	Anna Dyvik (SWE)	3:25.43 (4)	+3.71	46
5	Anna Svendsen (NOR)	3:27.78 (8)	+5.26	44
6	Heidi Weng (NOR)	3:31.60 (21)	+6.64	42
7	Astrid Uhrenholdt Jacobsen (NOR)	3:28.35 (9)	SF	32
8	Linn Svahn (SWE)	3:22.99 (2)	SF	30
9	Therese Johaug (NOR)	3:23.58 (3)	SF	28
10	Emma Ribom (SWE)	3:30.20 (17)	SF	26
11	Tiril Udnes Weng (NOR)	3:27.65 (7)	SF	24
12	Laurien van der Graaff (SUI)	3:33.27 (25)	SF	22

=== Stage 6 ===
23 February 2020, Trondheim, Norway

The race for "Fastest of the Day" counts for 2019–20 FIS Cross-Country World Cup points. No bonus seconds are awarded on this stage.

Men – 30 km Classic (pursuit)
Rank	Name	Time
1	Emil Iversen (NOR)	1:21:25.9
2	Iivo Niskanen (FIN)	+10.9
3	Hans Christer Holund (NOR)	+37.8
4	Simen Hegstad Krüger (NOR)	+48.6
5	Johannes Høsflot Klæbo (NOR)	+59.9
6	Martin Løwstrøm Nyenget (NOR)	+1:12.6
7	Pål Golberg (NOR)	+1:51.7
8	Dario Cologna (SUI)	+2:18.5
9	Francesco de Fabiani (ITA)	+2:47.3
10	Vitaliy Pukhkalo (KAZ)	+2:52.5
11	Giandomenico Salvadori (ITA)	+2:52.8
12	Evgeniy Belov (RUS)	+2:58.8
13	Jonas Baumann (SUI)	+2:59.5
14	Andrey Larkov (RUS)	+3:13.0
15	Daniel Rickardsson (SWE)	+3:13.7
16	Clément Parisse (FRA)	+3:16.3
17	Jens Burman (SWE)	+3:33.3
18	Sjur Røthe (NOR)	+3:38.5
19	Maurice Manificat (FRA)	+3:56.2
20	Simone Daprà (ITA)	+3:56.9

Women – 15 km Classic (pursuit)
Rank	Name	Time
1	Therese Johaug (NOR)	41:13.8
2	Astrid Uhrenholdt Jacobsen (NOR)	+44.8
3	Krista Pärmäkoski (FIN)	+1:04.4
4	Ebba Andersson (SWE)	+1:06.3
5	Ingvild Flugstad Østberg (NOR)	+1:07.5
6	Heidi Weng (NOR)	+1:07.8
7	Anne Kyllönen (FIN)	+1:33.5
8	Linn Svahn (SWE)	+1:35.0
8	Anna Dyvik (SWE)	+1:35.0
10	Anna Svendsen (NOR)	+1:36.0
11	Laura Mononen (FIN)	+1:36.8
12	Lotta Udnes Weng (NOR)	+1:37.7
13	Alisa Zhambalova (RUS)	+1:39.5
14	Tiril Udnes Weng (NOR)	+1:49.5
15	Sadie Maubet Bjornsen (USA)	+1:50.8
16	Charlotte Kalla (SWE)	+2:02.7
17	Jessie Diggins (USA)	+2:08.1
18	Jonna Sundling (SWE)	+2:13.1
19	Linn Sömskar (SWE)	+2:21.9
20	Teresa Stadlober (AUT)	+2:22.7

== Points distribution ==
The table shows the number of 2019/2020 FIS Cross-Country World Cup points won in the Ski Tour 2020 for men and women.

Place	1	2	3	4	5	6	7	8	9	10	11	12	13	14	15	16	17	18	19	20	21	22	23	24	25	26	27	28	29	30
Overall Standings	300	240	180	150	135	120	108	96	87	78	72	66	60	54	48	45	42	39	36	33	30	27	24	21	18	15	12	9	6	3
Each Stage	50	46	43	40	37	34	32	30	28	26	24	22	20	18	16	15	14	13	12	11	10	9	8	7	6	5	4	3	2	1

== Sources ==
- Rules for the FIS Cross-Country World Cup (PDF). International Ski Federation (FIS). 2019.
- "RULES FOR THE FIS CROSS-COUNTRY WORLD CUP 2020/2021" (PDF). International Ski Federation.
- Ski Tour 2020. International Ski Federation (FIS). 2020.
