= 2022 NCAA Skiing Championships =

American college skiing competition

2022 NCAA Skiing tournament
- Teams: 22
- Format: Duration scoring
- Finals site: Park City and Midway, Utah
- Champions: Utah Utes (14th title)
- Runner-up: Vermont Catamounts
- Semifinalists: Denver Pioneers; Colorado Buffaloes
- Television: NCAA

The 2022 NCAA Skiing Championships took place from March 9 to March 12 in Utah, at Soldier Hollow Nordic Center, which hosted the cross-country events, and Park City Mountain Resort, which hosted the alpine events. The tournament went into its 68th consecutive NCAA Skiing Championships, and featured twenty-two teams across all divisions.

== Team results ==
- Note: Top 10 only
- (H): Team from hosting U.S. state

Rank	Team	Points
1st place, gold medalist(s)	Utah (H)	578
2nd place, silver medalist(s)	Vermont	511.5
3rd place, bronze medalist(s)	Denver	436.5
4	Colorado	435
5	Alaska Anchorage	269
6	New Hampshire	241
7	Alaska Fairbanks	239
8	Westminster (H)	231
9	Montana State	213
10	Middlebury	209.5

== Individual Results ==
- Note: Table does not include consolation
- (H): Individual from hosting U.S. State

Games	First	Second	Third
Women's giant slalom details	Magdalena Luczak; Colorado	Katie Hensien (Colorado) Denver	Katie Parker; Utah (H)
Women's giant slalom details	Magdalena Luczak; Colorado	Katie Hensien (Colorado) Denver	Nellie Talbot; Montana State
Women's 5K classical details	Novie McCabe; Utah (H)	Anna Bizyukova; Vermont	Sophia Laukli; Utah (H)
Women's 5K classical details	Novie McCabe; Utah (H)	Anna Bizyukova; Vermont	Anabel Needham; Michigan Tech
Women's slalom details	Amelia Smart (Colorado) Denver	Justine Clement; Vermont	Julia Toiviainen (Utah) Westminster (H)
Women's slalom details	Amelia Smart (Colorado) Denver	Justine Clement; Vermont	Stef Fleckenstein; Colorado
Women's 15K freestyle details	Sophia Laukli; Utah (H)	Novie McCabe; Utah (H)	Jasmine Lyons; New Hampshire
Women's 15K freestyle details	Sophia Laukli; Utah (H)	Novie McCabe; Utah (H)	Kendall Kramer; Alaska Fairbanks
Men's giant slalom details	Filip Forejtek; Colorado	Gustav Vollo; Utah (H)	Riley Seger; Montana State
Men's giant slalom details	Filip Forejtek; Colorado	Gustav Vollo; Utah (H)	Tobias Kogler (Colorado) Denver
Men's 10K classical details	Ben Ogden; Vermont	Andreas Kirkeng (Colorado) Denver	Magnus Boe; Colorado
Men's 10K classical details	Ben Ogden; Vermont	Andreas Kirkeng (Colorado) Denver	Christopher Kalev; Alaska Fairbanks
Men's slalom details	Mathias Tefre; Vermont	Gustav Vollo; Utah (H)	Joachim Lindstol; Vermont
Men's slalom details	Mathias Tefre; Vermont	Gustav Vollo; Utah (H)	Simon Fournier (Colorado) Denver
Men's 20K freestyle details	Ben Ogden; Vermont	Samuel Hendry; Utah (H)	JC Schoonmaker; Alaska Anchorage
Men's 20K freestyle details	Ben Ogden; Vermont	Samuel Hendry; Utah (H)	Bernhard Flaschberger (Colorado) Denver
