= Perttu Hyvärinen =

Finnish cross-country skier (born 1991)

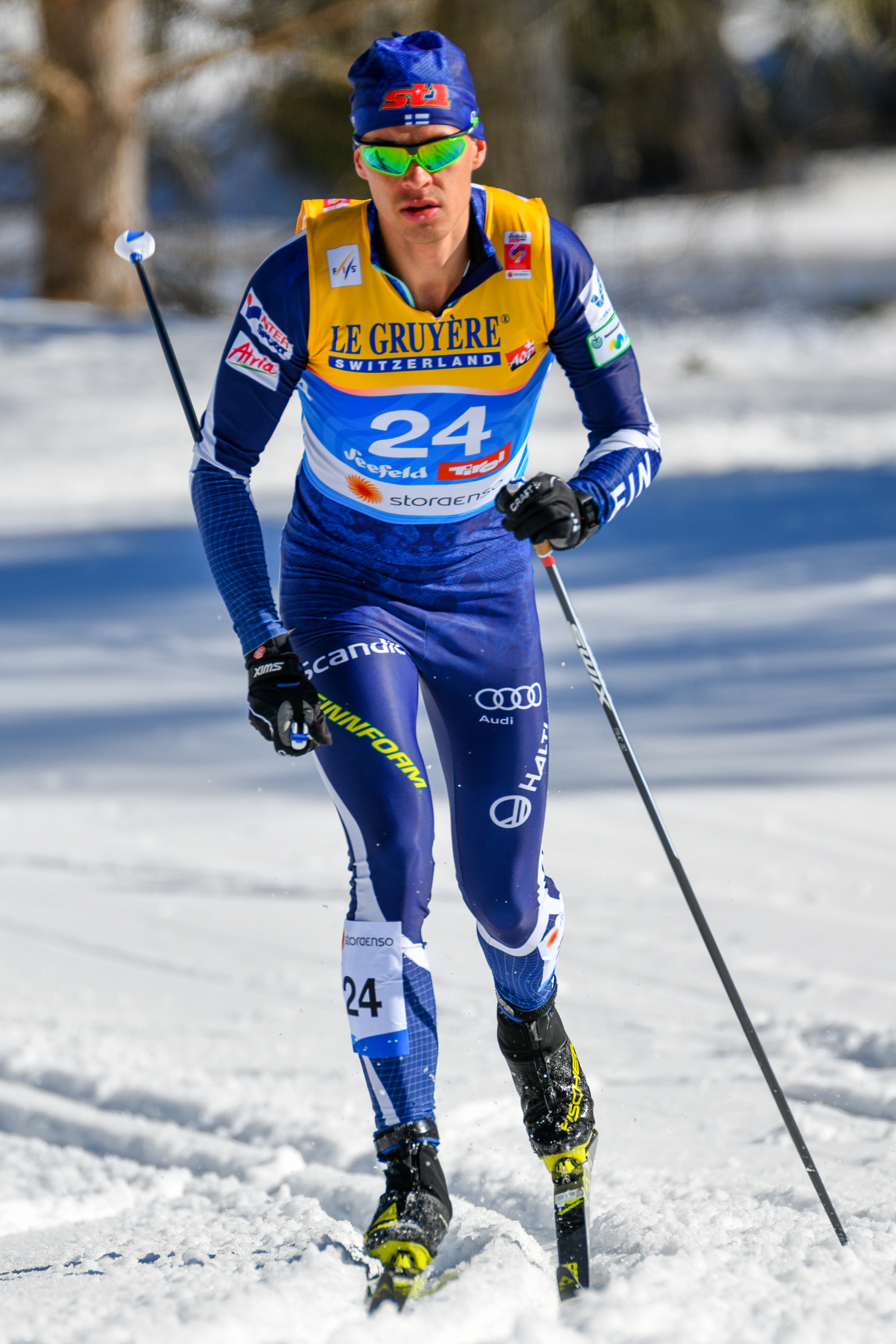
- Hyvärinen in 2019

Personal information
- Nationality: Finland
- Born: 5 June 1991 (age 35) Kuopio, Finland

Sport
- Sport: Skiing
- Club: Puijon Hiihtoseura

World Cup career
- Seasons: 13 – (2011, 2013–2026)
- Indiv. starts: 116
- Indiv. podiums: 1
- Indiv. wins: 1
- Team starts: 14
- Team podiums: 2
- Team wins: 0
- Overall titles: 0 – (22nd in 2023)
- Discipline titles: 0
Medal record
Men's cross-country skiing
Representing Finland
World Championships
Silver medal – second place	2023 Planica	4 × 10 km relay
Junior World Championships
Bronze medal – third place	2011 Otepää	10 km freestyle
Bronze medal – third place	2011 Otepää	20 km skiathlon
Bronze medal – third place	2011 Otepää	4 × 5 km relay
- Updated on 7 January 2024

Perttu Hyvärinen (born 5 June 1991) is a former Finnish cross-country skier. Born and raised in Kuopio, he has represented Finland in four World Championships and twice in the Olympic Games. He is a silver medalist from the 4 × 10 kilometre relay at the 2023 World Championships.

Among Hyvärinen's career-best individual performances are a 6th place in the 15 kilometre classical and a 7th place in the 30 km skiathlon at the 2022 Winter Olympics in Beijing. His best individual result in the World Cup is a win at the 10 km Individual start in Toblach during the 2023-24 season. He has two team podium placements, both from relays.

== Cross-country skiing results ==
All results are sourced from the International Ski Federation (FIS).

=== Olympic Games ===
Year	Age	15 km individual	30 km skiathlon	50 km mass start	Sprint	4 × 10 km relay	Team sprint
2018	26	35	41	29	—	4	—
2022	30	6	7	19^{[a]}	—	6	—

^{a} Distance reduced to 30 km due to weather conditions.

=== World Championships ===
- 1 medal (1 silver)

Year	Age	15 km individual	30 km skiathlon	50 km mass start	Sprint	4 × 10 km relay	Team sprint
2015	23	25	—	—	—	—	—
2017	25	—	30	44	—	—	—
2019	27	19	23	42	—	4	—
2021	29	17	—	32	—	6	—
2023	31	13	10	DNF	—	Silver	—

=== World Cup ===
==== Season standings ====
Season	Age	Discipline standings			Ski Tour standings				
Season	Age	Overall	Distance	Sprint	Nordic Opening	Tour de Ski	Ski Tour 2020	World Cup Final	Ski Tour Canada
2011	19	NC	NC	—	—	—	—N/a	—	—N/a
2013	21	NC	NC	—	—	—	—N/a	—	—N/a
2014	22	NC	NC	—	—	—	—N/a	—	—N/a
2015	23	NC	NC	NC	68	DNF	—N/a	—N/a	—N/a
2016	24	133	84	NC	51	—	—N/a	—N/a	—
2017	25	67	51	90	21	31	—N/a	—	—N/a
2018	26	119	80	NC	—	—	—N/a	71	—N/a
2019	27	103	65	—	—	—	—N/a	—	—N/a
2020	28	23	17	87	13	14	—	—N/a	—N/a
2021	29	55	40	NC	22	NC	—N/a	—N/a	—N/a
2022	30	38	27	NC	—N/a	21	—N/a	—N/a	—N/a
2023	31	22	11	110	—N/a	18	—N/a	—N/a	—N/a
2024	32	31	22	91	—N/a	17	—N/a	—N/a	—N/a

==== Individual podiums ====
- 1 victory – (1 SWC)
- 1 podium – (1 SWC)

No.	Season	Date	Location	Race	Level	Place
1	2023–24	31 December 2023	Toblach, Italy	10 km Individual C	Stage World Cup	1st

==== Team podiums ====
- 2 podiums – (2 RL)

No.	Season	Date	Location	Race	Level	Place	Teammates
1	2020–21	24 January 2021	Lahti, Finland	4 × 7.5 km Relay C/F	World Cup	2nd	Hakola / Niskanen / Mäki
2	2021–22	13 March 2022	Falun, Sweden	4 × 5 km Mixed Relay F	World Cup	2nd	K. Niskanen / I. Niskanen / Pärmäkoski
