= Jules Lapierre =

French cross-country skier (born 1996)

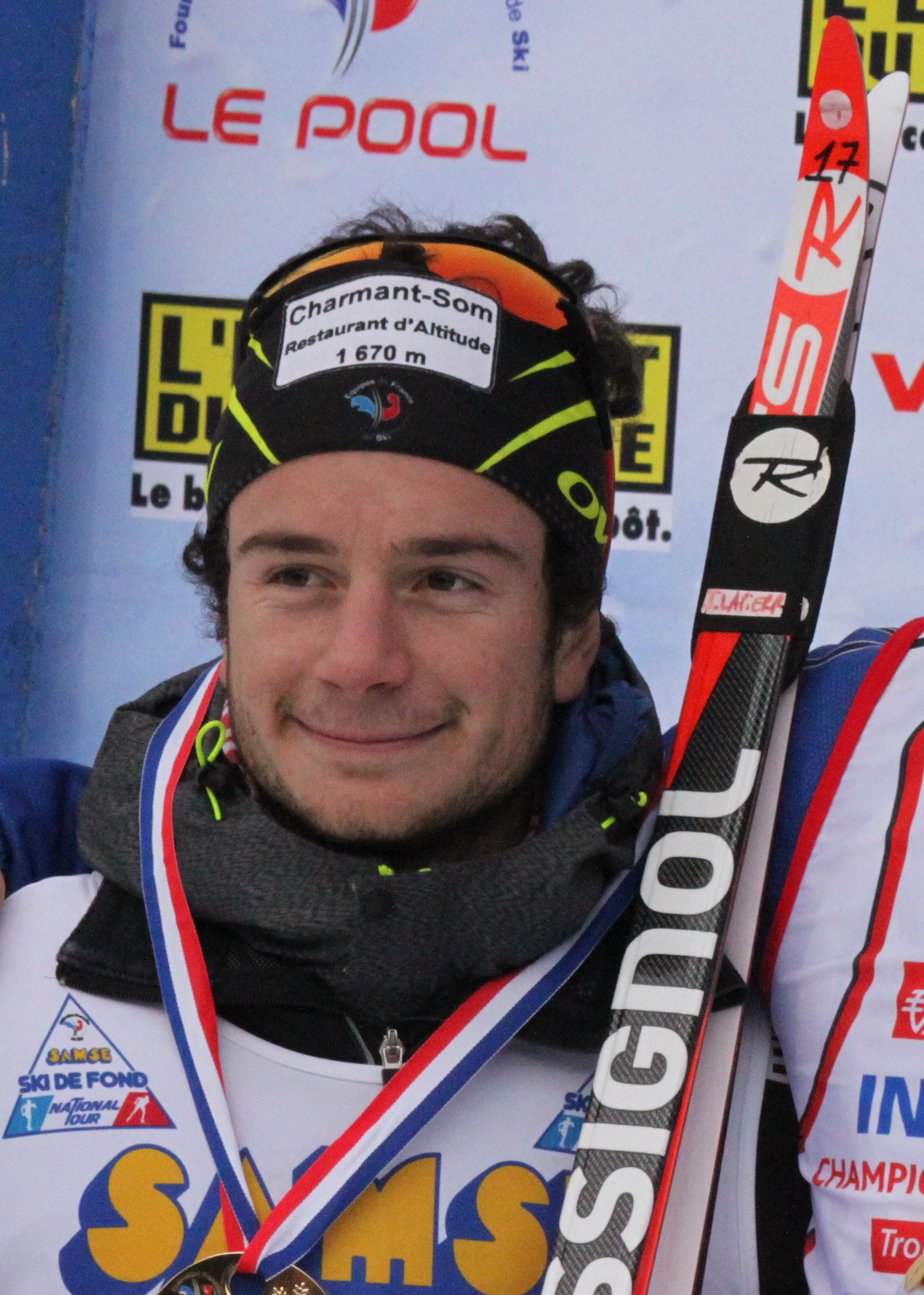
- Lapierre in 2016

Personal information
- Nationality: France
- Born: 2 January 1996 (age 30) Grenoble, France

Sport
- Sport: Skiing
- Club: Ski Nordique Chartrousin

World Cup career
- Seasons: 8 – (2018–2019, 2021–present)
- Indiv. starts: 105
- Indiv. podiums: 4
- Indiv. wins: 1
- Team starts: 5
- Team podiums: 0
- Overall titles: 0 – (28th in 2023)
- Discipline titles: 0
Medal record
Men's cross-country skiing
Representing France
World Championships
Bronze medal – third place	2021 Oberstdorf	4 × 10 km relay
U23 World Championships
Gold medal – first place	2019 Lahti	15 km freestyle
Silver medal – second place	2018 Goms	30 km skiathlon
Junior World Championships
Silver medal – second place	2014 Val di Fiemme	4 × 5 km relay
Silver medal – second place	2015 Almaty	4 × 5 km relay
Bronze medal – third place	2016 Râșnov	4 × 5 km relay
- Updated on 22 March 2026

Jules Lapierre (born 2 January 1996) is a French cross-country skier who competes internationally.

He represented France at the 2018 Winter Olympics.

== Cross-country skiing results ==
All results are sourced from the International Ski Federation (FIS).

=== Olympic Games ===
Year	Age	15 km individual	30 km skiathlon	50 km mass start	Sprint	4 × 10 km relay	Team sprint
2018	22	—	15	—	—	—	—
2022	26	—	14	15^{[a]}	—	—	—
2026	30	16	9	—	—	—	—

^{a} Distance reduced to 30 km due to weather conditions.

=== World Championships ===
- 1 medal – (1 bronze)

Year	Age	15 km individual	20/30 km skiathlon	50 km mass start	Sprint	4 × 10 km relay	Team sprint
2019	23	24	19	—	—	—	—
2021	25	—	16	—	—	Bronze	—
2023	27	16	8	—	—	4	—
2025	29	—	19	20	—	4	—

=== World Cup ===
==== Season standings ====
Season	Age	Discipline standings				Ski Tour standings		
Season	Age	Overall	Distance	Sprint	U23	Nordic Opening	Tour de Ski	World Cup Final
2018	22	124	82	NC	19	—	DNF	—
2019	23	36	32	NC	5	22	14	31
2021	25	44	36	NC	—N/a	—	20	—N/a
2022	26	118	68	NC	—N/a	—N/a	DNF	—N/a
2023	27	28	22	NC	—N/a	—N/a	10	—N/a
2024	28	28	21	NC	—N/a	—N/a	9	—N/a
2025	29	55	27	NC	—N/a	—N/a	—	—N/a
2026	30	30	19	NC	—N/a	—N/a	24	—N/a

==== Individual podiums ====
- 1 victory – (1 SWC)
- 4 podiums – (1 WC, 3 SWC)

No.	Season	Date	Location	Race	Level	Place
1	2022–23	8 January 2023	Val di Fiemme, Italy	10 km Mass Start F	Stage World Cup	3rd
2	2023–24	7 January 2024	Val di Fiemme, Italy	10 km Mass Start F	Stage World Cup	1st
3	2023–24	28 January 2024	Goms, Switzerland	20 km Mass Start F	World Cup	3rd
4	2025–26	4 January 2026	Val di Fiemme, Italy	10 km Mass Start F	Stage World Cup	2nd
