= 2023–24 FIS Cross-Country World Cup =

Cross-country skiing competition

| Discipline | Men | Women |
| Overall | (Norway) Harald Østberg Amundsen (1) | (United States) Jessie Diggins (2) |
| Distance | (Norway) Harald Østberg Amundsen (1) | (United States) Jessie Diggins (2) |
| Sprint | (Norway) Johannes Høsflot Klæbo (6) | (Sweden) Linn Svahn (2) |
| U23 | (Sweden) Edvin Anger (1) | (Norway) Margrethe Bergane (1) |
| Bonus ranking | (Norway) Johannes Høsflot Klæbo (4) | (United States) Jessie Diggins (1) |
| Nations Cup | Norway (35) | Sweden (3) |
- Nations Cup overall: Norway (35)

Stage events
| Tour de Ski | (Norway) Harald Østberg Amundsen (1) | (United States) Jessie Diggins (2) |

Competition
| Edition | 43rd | 43rd |
| Locations | 15 | 15 |
| Individual | 33 | 33 |
| Relay/Team | 3 | 3 |
| Mixed | 1 | 1 |

The 2023–24 FIS Cross-Country World Cup, organized by the International Ski Federation (FIS) was the 43rd World Cup in cross-country skiing for men and women.

The season started on 24 November 2023 in Ruka, Finland, and concluded on 17 March 2024 in Falun, Sweden.

Johannes Høsflot Klæbo (men's) and Tiril Udnes Weng (women's), both of Norway, were the reigning champions from the previous season. However, they did not defend their title.

Harald Østberg Amundsen from Norway and Jessie Diggins from United States, became the new overall champions.

In October 2023, FIS decided to prolong the suspension of the Russian and Belarusian national team from competitions due to the Russian invasion of Ukraine.

With a stop at the 2024 Stifel Loppet Cup in Minneapolis, the season featured the first World Cup event in the United States in 23 years.

== Map of world cup hosts ==
All 15 locations hosting world cup events in this season.

Europe

North America

Period I Period II – Tour de Ski Period III Period IV

== Men ==
=== Calendar ===
Key: C – Classic / F – Freestyle; MSS – Mass Start / PUR – Pursuit
| # | WC | Date | Place | Discipline | Winner | Second | Third | R. |
|---|---|---|---|---|---|---|---|---|
| 1 | 1 | 24 November 2023 | (Finland) Ruka | Sprint C | (Norway) Erik Valnes | (France) Richard Jouve | (Norway) Johannes Høsflot Klæbo | |
| 2 | 2 | 25 November 2023 | (Finland) Ruka | 10 km C | (Norway) Martin Løwstrøm Nyenget | (Finland) Iivo Niskanen | (Norway) Erik Valnes | |
| 3 | 3 | 26 November 2023 | (Finland) Ruka | 20 km F MSS | (Norway) Jan Thomas Jenssen | (Czech Republic) Michal Novák | (Norway) Harald Østberg Amundsen | |
| 4 | 4 | 2 December 2023 | (Sweden) Gällivare | 10 km F | (Norway) Pål Golberg | (Norway) Harald Østberg Amundsen | (Norway) Iver Tildheim Andersen | |
| 5 | 5 | 9 December 2023 | (Sweden) Östersund | Sprint C | (Norway) Johannes Høsflot Klæbo | (Norway) Erik Valnes | (United States) JC Schoonmaker | |
| 6 | 6 | 10 December 2023 | (Sweden) Östersund | 10 km F | (Norway) Harald Østberg Amundsen | (Norway) Simen Hegstad Krüger | (Norway) Didrik Tønseth | |
| 7 | 7 | 15 December 2023 | (Norway) Trondheim | Sprint F | (Norway) Johannes Høsflot Klæbo | (France) Lucas Chanavat | (Norway) Harald Østberg Amundsen | |
| 8 | 8 | 16 December 2023 | (Norway) Trondheim | 20 km skiathlon | (Norway) Johannes Høsflot Klæbo | (United Kingdom) Andrew Musgrave | (Norway) Didrik Tønseth | |
| 9 | 9 | 17 December 2023 | (Norway) Trondheim | 10 km C | (Norway) Johannes Høsflot Klæbo | (Norway) Pål Golberg | (Norway) Henrik Dønnestad | |
| TdS | 10 | 30 December 2023 | (Italy) Toblach | Sprint F | (France) Lucas Chanavat | (France) Jules Chappaz | (United States) Ben Ogden | |
| TdS | 11 | 31 December 2023 | (Italy) Toblach | 10 km C | (Finland) Perttu Hyvärinen | (Norway) Erik Valnes | (Norway) Harald Østberg Amundsen | |
| TdS | 12 | 1 January 2024 | (Italy) Toblach | 20 km F PUR | (Norway) Harald Østberg Amundsen | (Norway) Erik Valnes | (Norway) Jan Thomas Jenssen | |
| TdS | 13 | 3 January 2024 | (Switzerland) Davos | Sprint F | (France) Lucas Chanavat | (Sweden) Edvin Anger | (Italy) Federico Pellegrino | |
| TdS | 14 | 4 January 2024 | (Switzerland) Davos | 20 km C PUR | (Norway) Harald Østberg Amundsen | (Norway) Henrik Dønnestad | (Norway) Martin Løwstrøm Nyenget | |
| TdS | 15 | 6 January 2024 | (Italy) Val di Fiemme | 15 km C MSS | (Norway) Erik Valnes | (Sweden) William Poromaa | (Switzerland) Cyril Fähndrich | |
| TdS | 16 | 7 January 2024 | (Italy) Val di Fiemme | 10 km F MSS Climb | (France) Jules Lapierre | (Germany) Friedrich Moch | (France) Hugo Lapalus | |
| 10 | 18th Tour de Ski Overall (30 December 2023 – 7 January 2024) | | | | (Norway) Harald Østberg Amundsen | (Germany) Friedrich Moch | (France) Hugo Lapalus | |
| 11 | 17 | 19 January 2024 | (Germany) Oberhof | Sprint C | (Norway) Erik Valnes | (Norway) Ansgar Evensen | (Norway) Even Northug | |
| 12 | 18 | 20 January 2024 | (Germany) Oberhof | 20 km C MSS | (Norway) Erik Valnes | (Norway) Martin Løwstrøm Nyenget | (Norway) Pål Golberg | |
| 13 | 19 | 27 January 2024 | (Switzerland) Goms | Sprint F | (Norway) Johannes Høsflot Klæbo | (France) Lucas Chanavat | (Norway) Håvard Solås Taugbøl | |
| 14 | 20 | 28 January 2024 | (Switzerland) Goms | 20 km F MSS | (Norway) Johannes Høsflot Klæbo | (Norway) Simen Hegstad Krüger | (France) Jules Lapierre | |
| 15 | 21 | 9 February 2024 | (Canada) Canmore | 15 km F MSS | (Norway) Simen Hegstad Krüger | (Norway) Harald Østberg Amundsen | (Austria) Mika Vermeulen | |
| 16 | 22 | 10 February 2024 | (Canada) Canmore | Sprint F | (Norway) Johannes Høsflot Klæbo | (Norway) Erik Valnes | (Sweden) Edvin Anger | |
| 17 | 23 | 11 February 2024 | (Canada) Canmore | 20 km C MSS | (Norway) Pål Golberg | (Norway) Johannes Høsflot Klæbo | (Norway) Mattis Stenshagen | |
| 18 | 24 | 13 February 2024 | (Canada) Canmore | Sprint C | (Norway) Johannes Høsflot Klæbo | (France) Richard Jouve | (Norway) Erik Valnes | |
| 19 | 25 | 17 February 2024 | (United States) Minneapolis | Sprint F | (Norway) Johannes Høsflot Klæbo | (Italy) Federico Pellegrino | (Norway) Håvard Solås Taugbøl | |
| 20 | 26 | 18 February 2024 | (United States) Minneapolis | 10 km F | (United States) Gus Schumacher | (Norway) Harald Østberg Amundsen | (Norway) Pål Golberg | |
| 21 | 27 | 2 March 2024 | (Finland) Lahti | 20 km C | (Norway) Johannes Høsflot Klæbo | (Finland) Iivo Niskanen | (Norway) Martin Løwstrøm Nyenget | |
| 22 | 28 | 3 March 2024 | (Finland) Lahti | Sprint F | (Norway) Johannes Høsflot Klæbo | (France) Lucas Chanavat | (Switzerland) Valerio Grond | |
| 23 | 29 | 10 March 2024 | (Norway) Oslo | 50 km C MSS | (Norway) Johannes Høsflot Klæbo | (Norway) Martin Løwstrøm Nyenget | (Norway) Pål Golberg | |
| 24 | 30 | 12 March 2024 | (Norway) Drammen | Sprint C | (Norway) Johannes Høsflot Klæbo | (Norway) Håvard Solås Taugbøl | (Norway) Even Northug | |
| 25 | 31 | 15 March 2024 | (Sweden) Falun | Sprint C | (Norway) Johannes Høsflot Klæbo | (Finland) Lauri Vuorinen | (Norway) Harald Østberg Amundsen | |
| 26 | 32 | 16 March 2024 | (Sweden) Falun | 10 km C | (Norway) Johannes Høsflot Klæbo | (Finland) Iivo Niskanen | (Norway) Martin Løwstrøm Nyenget | |
| 27 | 33 | 17 March 2024 | (Sweden) Falun | 20 km F MSS | (Norway) Johannes Høsflot Klæbo | (Norway) Gjøran Tefre | (Norway) Martin Løwstrøm Nyenget | |

=== Men's relay ===
Key: C – Classic / F – Freestyle
| # | Date | Place | Discipline | Winner | Second | Third | Red bib (After competition) | R. |
|---|---|---|---|---|---|---|---|---|
| 1 | 3 December 2023 | (Sweden) Gällivare | 4 × 7.5 km relay C/F | Norway: 1. Pål Golberg; 2. Martin Løwstrøm Nyenget; 3. Simen Hegstad Krüger; 4. Jan Thomas Jenssen | Sweden I: 1. Johan Häggström; 2. Calle Halfvarsson; 3. Leo Johansson; 4. Edvin Anger | Germany: 1. Janosch Brugger; 2. Albert Kuchler; 3. Friedrich Moch; 4. Anian Sossau | Norway | |
| 2 | 21 January 2024 | (Germany) Oberhof | 4 × 7.5 km relay C/F | Norway I: 1. Martin Løwstrøm Nyenget; 2. Erik Valnes; 3. Pål Golberg; 4. Johannes Høsflot Klæbo | Italy I: 1. Dietmar Nöckler; 2. Elia Barp; 3. Simone Daprà; 4. Federico Pellegrino | Norway II: 1. Håvard Solås Taugbøl; 2. Didrik Tønseth; 3. Simen Hegstad Krüger; 4. Mattis Stenshagen | Norway | |
| 3 | 1 March 2024 | (Finland) Lahti | Team sprint C | Norway I: 1. Pål Golberg; 2. Johannes Høsflot Klæbo | Norway II: 1. Håvard Solås Taugbøl; 2. Even Northug | Finland I: 1. Iivo Niskanen; 2. Lauri Vuorinen | Norway | |

=== Overall leaders ===
| No. | Holder | Date gained | Place | Date lost | Place | Number of competitions |
|---|---|---|---|---|---|---|
| 1. | (Norway) Erik Valnes | 24 November 2023 | (Finland) Ruka | 26 November 2023 | (Finland) Ruka | 2 |
| 2. | (Norway) Harald Østberg Amundsen | 26 November 2023 | (Finland) Ruka | 9 December 2023 | (Sweden) Östersund | 2 |
| 3. | (Norway) Pål Golberg | 9 December 2023 | (Sweden) Östersund | 10 December 2023 | (Sweden) Östersund | 1 |
| 4. | (Norway) Harald Østberg Amundsen | 10 December 2023 | (Sweden) Östersund | 17 December 2023 | (Norway) Trondheim | 3 |
| 5. | (Norway) Johannes Høsflot Klæbo | 17 December 2023 | (Norway) Trondheim | 30 December 2023 | (Italy) Toblach | 1 |
| 6. | (Norway) Harald Østberg Amundsen | 30 December 2023 | (Italy) Toblach | Overall Winner | | 25 |

=== Standings ===
==== Overall ====
| Rank | after all 34 events | Points |
|---|---|---|
| | (Norway) Harald Østberg Amundsen | 2654 |
| 2 | (Norway) Johannes Høsflot Klæbo | 2600 |
| 3 | (Norway) Erik Valnes | 2106 |
| 4 | (Norway) Pål Golberg | 1869 |
| 5 | (Norway) Martin Løwstrøm Nyenget | 1409 |
| 6 | (Germany) Friedrich Moch | 1305 |
| 7 | (Austria) Mika Vermeulen | 1286 |
| 8 | (Italy) Federico Pellegrino | 1229 |
| 9 | (France) Hugo Lapalus | 1201 |
| 10 | (Canada) Antoine Cyr | 1095 |

==== Distance ====
| Rank | after all 20 events | Points |
|---|---|---|
| | (Norway) Harald Østberg Amundsen | 1571 |
| 2 | (Norway) Johannes Høsflot Klæbo | 1389 |
| 3 | (Norway) Pål Golberg | 1334 |
| 4 | (Norway) Martin Løwstrøm Nyenget | 1154 |
| 5 | (Austria) Mika Vermeulen | 1029 |
| 6 | (Germany) Friedrich Moch | 1016 |
| 7 | (France) Hugo Lapalus | 931 |
| 8 | (United Kingdom) Andrew Musgrave | 910 |
| 9 | (Norway) Erik Valnes | 877 |
| 10 | (Norway) Simen Hegstad Krüger | 862 |

==== Sprint ====
| Rank | after all 13 events | Points |
|---|---|---|
| | (Norway) Johannes Høsflot Klæbo | 1211 |
| 2 | (Norway) Erik Valnes | 1004 |
| 3 | (France) Lucas Chanavat | 937 |
| 4 | (Norway) Håvard Solås Taugbøl | 803 |
| 5 | (Norway) Harald Østberg Amundsen | 783 |
| 6 | (Norway) Even Northug | 773 |
| 7 | (Switzerland) Valerio Grond | 735 |
| 8 | (Sweden) Edvin Anger | 675 |
| 9 | (Finland) Lauri Vuorinen | 645 |
| 10 | (United States) JC Schoonmaker | 639 |

==== U23 ====
| Rank | after all 34 events | Points |
|---|---|---|
| | (Sweden) Edvin Anger | 942 |
| 2 | (Italy) Elia Barp | 654 |
| 3 | (United States) Zanden McMullen | 483 |
| 4 | (Norway) Matz William Jenssen | 383 |
| 5 | (Sweden) Emil Danielsson | 352 |
| 6 | (Finland) Niilo Moilanen | 347 |
| 7 | (Finland) Emil Liekari | 245 |
| 8 | (France) Rémi Bourdin | 240 |
| 9 | (Germany) Jan Stölben | 225 |
| 10 | (Norway) Martin Kirkeberg Mørk | 196 |

==== Bonus ranking ====
| Rank | after all 11 events | Points |
|---|---|---|
| 1 | (Norway) Johannes Høsflot Klæbo | 243 |
| 2 | (Norway) Harald Østberg Amundsen | 212 |
| 3 | (Norway) Erik Valnes | 140 |
| 4 | (Norway) Martin Løwstrøm Nyenget | 126 |
| 5 | (France) Lucas Chanavat | 120 |
| 6 | (Italy) Federico Pellegrino | 88 |
| 7 | (United Kingdom) Andrew Musgrave | 84 |
| 8 | (Norway) Pål Golberg | 83 |
| 9 | (Austria) Mika Vermeulen | 80 |
| 10 | (Switzerland) Valerio Grond | 76 |

==== Prize money ====
| Rank | after all 47 payouts | CHF |
|---|---|---|
| 1 | (Norway) Johannes Høsflot Klæbo | 326 950 |
| 2 | (Norway) Harald Østberg Amundsen | 247 800 |
| 3 | (Norway) Erik Valnes | 171 750 |
| 4 | (Norway) Pål Golberg | 124 300 |
| 5 | (Norway) Martin Løwstrøm Nyenget | 116 600 |
| 6 | (Germany) Friedrich Moch | 94 325 |
| 7 | (France) Hugo Lapalus | 61 000 |
| 8 | (Norway) Simen Hegstad Krüger | 58 450 |
| 9 | (France) Lucas Chanavat | 54 000 |
| 10 | (Italy) Federico Pellegrino | 44 475 |

== Women ==
=== Calendar ===
Key: C – Classic / F – Freestyle; MSS – Mass Start / PUR – Pursuit
| # | WC | Date | Place | Discipline | Winner | Second | Third | R. |
|---|---|---|---|---|---|---|---|---|
| 1 | 1 | 24 November 2023 | (Finland) Ruka | Sprint C | (Sweden) Emma Ribom | (Sweden) Jonna Sundling | (Norway) Kristine Stavås Skistad | |
| 2 | 2 | 25 November 2023 | (Finland) Ruka | 10 km C | (Sweden) Ebba Andersson | (United States) Rosie Brennan | (Sweden) Frida Karlsson | |
| 3 | 3 | 26 November 2023 | (Finland) Ruka | 20 km F MSS | (Sweden) Moa Ilar | (United States) Jessie Diggins | (United States) Rosie Brennan | |
| 4 | 4 | 2 December 2023 | (Sweden) Gällivare | 10 km F | (United States) Jessie Diggins | (Sweden) Ebba Andersson | (Sweden) Moa Ilar | |
| 5 | 5 | 9 December 2023 | (Sweden) Östersund | Sprint C | (Sweden) Emma Ribom | (Norway) Kristine Stavås Skistad | (Sweden) Linn Svahn | |
| 6 | 6 | 10 December 2023 | (Sweden) Östersund | 10 km F | (United States) Jessie Diggins | (Norway) Heidi Weng | (Germany) Victoria Carl | |
| 7 | 7 | 15 December 2023 | (Norway) Trondheim | Sprint F | (Norway) Kristine Stavås Skistad | (Sweden) Linn Svahn | (Sweden) Emma Ribom | |
| 8 | 8 | 16 December 2023 | (Norway) Trondheim | 20 km skiathlon | (Sweden) Ebba Andersson | (United States) Jessie Diggins | (Norway) Heidi Weng | |
| 9 | 9 | 17 December 2023 | (Norway) Trondheim | 10 km C | (Germany) Victoria Carl | (United States) Rosie Brennan | (Sweden) Ebba Andersson | |
| TdS | 10 | 30 December 2023 | (Italy) Toblach | Sprint F | (Sweden) Linn Svahn | (Sweden) Jonna Sundling | (Norway) Kristine Stavås Skistad | |
| TdS | 11 | 31 December 2023 | (Italy) Toblach | 10 km C | (Finland) Kerttu Niskanen | (Germany) Victoria Carl | (United States) Jessie Diggins | |
| TdS | 12 | 1 January 2024 | (Italy) Toblach | 20 km F PUR | (United States) Jessie Diggins | (Germany) Victoria Carl | (Sweden) Linn Svahn | |
| TdS | 13 | 3 January 2024 | (Switzerland) Davos | Sprint F | (Sweden) Linn Svahn | (Norway) Kristine Stavås Skistad | (United States) Jessie Diggins | |
| TdS | 14 | 4 January 2024 | (Switzerland) Davos | 20 km C PUR | (Finland) Kerttu Niskanen | (United States) Rosie Brennan | (United States) Jessie Diggins | |
| TdS | 15 | 6 January 2024 | (Italy) Val di Fiemme | 15 km C MSS | (Sweden) Linn Svahn | (Sweden) Frida Karlsson | (Germany) Katharina Hennig | |
| TdS | 16 | 7 January 2024 | (Italy) Val di Fiemme | 10 km F MSS climb | (United States) Sophia Laukli | (Norway) Heidi Weng | (France) Delphine Claudel | |
| 10 | 18th Tour de Ski Overall (30 December 2023 – 7 January 2024) | | | | (United States) Jessie Diggins | (Norway) Heidi Weng | (Finland) Kerttu Niskanen | |
| 11 | 17 | 19 January 2024 | (Germany) Oberhof | Sprint C | (Sweden) Linn Svahn | (Sweden) Frida Karlsson | (Sweden) Jonna Sundling | |
| 12 | 18 | 20 January 2024 | (Germany) Oberhof | 20 km C MSS | (Sweden) Frida Karlsson | (Germany) Katharina Hennig | (Finland) Kerttu Niskanen | |
| 13 | 19 | 27 January 2024 | (Switzerland) Goms | Sprint F | (Sweden) Linn Svahn | (Sweden) Maja Dahlqvist | (Sweden) Jonna Sundling | |
| 14 | 20 | 28 January 2024 | (Switzerland) Goms | 20 km F MSS | (United States) Jessie Diggins | (Sweden) Frida Karlsson | (Switzerland) Nadine Fähndrich | |
| 15 | 21 | 9 February 2024 | (Canada) Canmore | 15 km F MSS | (United States) Jessie Diggins | (France) Delphine Claudel | (Norway) Heidi Weng | |
| 16 | 22 | 10 February 2024 | (Canada) Canmore | Sprint F | (Norway) Kristine Stavås Skistad | (Sweden) Maja Dahlqvist | (Sweden) Linn Svahn | |
| 17 | 23 | 11 February 2024 | (Canada) Canmore | 20 km C MSS | (Sweden) Frida Karlsson | (Finland) Kerttu Niskanen | (Norway) Heidi Weng | |
| 18 | 24 | 13 February 2024 | (Canada) Canmore | Sprint C | (Sweden) Linn Svahn | (Norway) Kristine Stavås Skistad | (Sweden) Jonna Sundling | |
| 19 | 25 | 17 February 2024 | (United States) Minneapolis | Sprint F | (Sweden) Jonna Sundling | (Sweden) Linn Svahn | (Norway) Kristine Stavås Skistad | |
| 20 | 26 | 18 February 2024 | (United States) Minneapolis | 10 km F | (Sweden) Jonna Sundling | (Sweden) Frida Karlsson | (United States) Jessie Diggins | |
| 21 | 27 | 2 March 2024 | (Finland) Lahti | 20 km C | (Finland) Krista Pärmäkoski | (Germany) Victoria Carl | (Finland) Kerttu Niskanen | |
| 22 | 28 | 3 March 2024 | (Finland) Lahti | Sprint F | (Norway) Kristine Stavås Skistad | (Germany) Coletta Rydzek | (Sweden) Maja Dahlqvist | |
| 23 | 29 | 9 March 2024 | (Norway) Oslo | 50 km C MSS | (Sweden) Frida Karlsson | (Sweden) Ebba Andersson | (Germany) Katharina Hennig | |
| 24 | 30 | 12 March 2024 | (Norway) Drammen | Sprint C | (Norway) Kristine Stavås Skistad | (Sweden) Linn Svahn | (United States) Rosie Brennan | |
| 25 | 31 | 15 March 2024 | (Sweden) Falun | Sprint C | (Norway) Kristine Stavås Skistad | (Sweden) Linn Svahn | (Sweden) Jonna Sundling | |
| 26 | 32 | 16 March 2024 | (Sweden) Falun | 10 km C | (Finland) Kerttu Niskanen | (Finland) Johanna Matintalo | (Sweden) Jonna Sundling | |
| 27 | 33 | 17 March 2024 | (Sweden) Falun | 20 km F MSS | (United States) Jessie Diggins | (Norway) Heidi Weng | (Norway) Anne Kjersti Kalvå | |

=== Women's relay ===
Key: C – Classic / F – Freestyle
| # | Date | Place | Discipline | Winner | Second | Third | Red bib (After competition) | R. |
|---|---|---|---|---|---|---|---|---|
| 1 | 3 December 2023 | (Sweden) Gällivare | 4 × 7.5 km relay C/F | Sweden I: 1. Moa Lundgren; 2. Emma Ribom; 3. Ebba Andersson; 4. Moa Ilar | Germany I: 1. Laura Gimmler; 2. Katharina Hennig; 3. Pia Fink; 4. Victoria Carl | United States: 1. Jessie Diggins; 2. Rosie Brennan; 3. Sophia Laukli; 4. Julia Kern | Sweden | |
| 2 | 21 January 2024 | (Germany) Oberhof | 4 × 7.5 km relay C/F | Sweden I: 1. Linn Svahn; 2. Frida Karlsson; 3. Ebba Andersson; 4. Jonna Sundling | Germany I: 1. Katherine Sauerbrey; 2. Katharina Hennig; 3. Pia Fink; 4. Victoria Carl | Finland: 1. Johanna Matintalo; 2. Anne Kyllönen; 3. Krista Pärmäkoski; 4. Jasmi Joensuu | Sweden | |
| 3 | 1 March 2024 | (Finland) Lahti | Team sprint C | Sweden I: 1. Jonna Sundling; 2. Linn Svahn | Finland I: 1. Krista Pärmäkoski; 2. Johanna Matintalo | Germany I: 1. Katharina Hennig; 2. Laura Gimmler | Sweden | |

=== Overall leaders ===
| No. | Holder | Date gained | Place | Date lost | Place | Number of competitions |
|---|---|---|---|---|---|---|
| 1. | (Sweden) Emma Ribom | 24 November 2023 | (Finland) Ruka | 25 November 2023 | (Finland) Ruka | 1 |
| 2. | (Sweden) Frida Karlsson | 25 November 2023 | (Finland) Ruka | 2 December 2023 | (Sweden) Gällivare | 2 |
| 3. | (United States) Jessie Diggins | 2 December 2023 | (Sweden) Gällivare | Overall Winner | | 31 |

=== Standings ===
==== Overall ====
| Rank | after all 34 events | Points |
|---|---|---|
| | (United States) Jessie Diggins | 2746 |
| 2 | (Sweden) Linn Svahn | 2571 |
| 3 | (Sweden) Frida Karlsson | 2309 |
| 4 | (Germany) Victoria Carl | 2114 |
| 5 | (Finland) Kerttu Niskanen | 2080 |
| 6 | (Sweden) Jonna Sundling | 2066 |
| 7 | (United States) Rosie Brennan | 2019 |
| 8 | (Norway) Heidi Weng | 1673 |
| 9 | (Sweden) Emma Ribom | 1636 |
| 10 | (Sweden) Ebba Andersson | 1409 |

==== Distance ====
| Rank | after all 20 events | Points |
|---|---|---|
| | (United States) Jessie Diggins | 1623 |
| 2 | (Germany) Victoria Carl | 1399 |
| 3 | (Sweden) Ebba Andersson | 1355 |
| 4 | (Finland) Kerttu Niskanen | 1354 |
| 5 | (Sweden) Frida Karlsson | 1321 |
| 6 | (Norway) Heidi Weng | 1275 |
| 7 | (United States) Rosie Brennan | 1221 |
| 8 | (Sweden) Linn Svahn | 1072 |
| 9 | (Austria) Teresa Stadlober | 1022 |
| 10 | (Germany) Katharina Hennig | 964 |

==== Sprint ====
| Rank | after all 13 events | Points |
|---|---|---|
| | (Sweden) Linn Svahn | 1274 |
| 2 | (Norway) Kristine Stavås Skistad | 1101 |
| 3 | (Sweden) Jonna Sundling | 918 |
| 4 | (Sweden) Maja Dahlqvist | 823 |
| 5 | (United States) Jessie Diggins | 823 |
| 6 | (Sweden) Emma Ribom | 785 |
| 7 | (Sweden) Frida Karlsson | 733 |
| 8 | (Sweden) Johanna Hagström | 718 |
| 9 | (Switzerland) Nadine Fähndrich | 661 |
| 10 | (United States) Rosie Brennan | 624 |

==== U23 ====
| Rank | after all 34 events | Points |
|---|---|---|
| | (Norway) Margrethe Bergane | 808 |
| 2 | (Switzerland) Nadja Kälin | 340 |
| 3 | (Switzerland) Anja Weber | 302 |
| 4 | (United States) Novie McCabe | 296 |
| 5 | (United States) Samantha Smith | 285 |
| 6 | (Norway) Maria Hartz Melling | 190 |
| 7 | (Finland) Vilma Ryytty | 158 |
| 8 | (Sweden) Märta Rosenberg | 144 |
| 9 | (Finland) Hilla Niemelä | 143 |
| 10 | (Switzerland) Marina Kälin | 131 |

==== Bonus ranking ====
| Rank | after all 11 events | Points |
|---|---|---|
| 1 | (United States) Jessie Diggins | 259 |
| 2 | (Sweden) Linn Svahn | 202 |
| 3 | (Sweden) Frida Karlsson | 197 |
| 4 | (Germany) Victoria Carl | 169 |
| 5 | (Sweden) Ebba Andersson | 166 |
| 6 | (Finland) Kerttu Niskanen | 118 |
| 7 | (Sweden) Jonna Sundling | 113 |
| 8 | (Norway) Kristine Stavås Skistad | 102 |
| 9 | (Switzerland) Nadine Fähndrich | 86 |
| 10 | (Sweden) Johanna Hagström | 86 |

==== Prize money ====
| Rank | after all 47 payouts | CHF |
|---|---|---|
| 1 | (United States) Jessie Diggins | 291 600 |
| 2 | (Sweden) Linn Svahn | 225 900 |
| 3 | (Sweden) Frida Karlsson | 187 500 |
| 4 | (Sweden) Jonna Sundling | 136 350 |
| 5 | (Finland) Kerttu Niskanen | 128 300 |
| 6 | (Norway) Heidi Weng | 119 850 |
| 7 | (Norway) Kristine Stavås Skistad | 117 300 |
| 8 | (Germany) Victoria Carl | 107 850 |
| 9 | (Sweden) Ebba Andersson | 92 000 |
| 10 | (Sweden) Emma Ribom | 78 450 |

== Mixed team ==
Key: C – Classic / F – Freestyle
| # | Date | Place | Discipline | Winner | Second | Third | Red bib (After competition) | R. |
|---|---|---|---|---|---|---|---|---|
| 1 | 26 January 2024 | (Switzerland) Goms | 4 × 5 km relay C/F | Sweden I: 1. William Poromaa; 2. Frida Karlsson; 3. Jens Burman; 4. Linn Svahn | Sweden II: 1. Johan Häggström; 2. Ebba Andersson; 3. Edvin Anger; 4. Maja Dahlqvist | Norway I: 1. Martin Løwstrøm Nyenget; 2. Margrethe Bergane; 3. Simen Hegstad Krüger; 4. Tiril Udnes Weng | Norway | |

== Nations Cup ==
=== Overall ===
| Rank | after all 75 events | Points |
|---|---|---|
| 1 | Norway | 17300 |
| 2 | Sweden | 15249 |
| 3 | Finland | 10336 |
| 4 | United States | 10266 |
| 5 | Germany | 9030 |
| 6 | France | 8003 |
| 7 | Switzerland | 6347 |
| 8 | Italy | 5301 |
| 9 | Austria | 2990 |
| 10 | Czech Republic | 2824 |

=== Men ===
| Rank | after all 38 events | Points |
|---|---|---|
| 1 | Norway | 10223 |
| 2 | Sweden | 5791 |
| 3 | France | 5361 |
| 4 | Finland | 4658 |
| 5 | United States | 3688 |
| 6 | Italy | 3635 |
| 7 | Switzerland | 3480 |
| 8 | Germany | 2958 |
| 9 | Canada | 1887 |
| 10 | Austria | 1744 |

=== Women ===
| Rank | after all 38 events | Points |
|---|---|---|
| 1 | Sweden | 9458 |
| 2 | Norway | 7077 |
| 3 | United States | 6578 |
| 4 | Germany | 6072 |
| 5 | Finland | 5678 |
| 6 | Switzerland | 2867 |
| 7 | France | 2642 |
| 8 | Italy | 1666 |
| 9 | Czech Republic | 1661 |
| 10 | Austria | 1246 |

== Podium table by nation ==
Table showing the World Cup podium places (gold–1st place, silver–2nd place, bronze–3rd place) by the countries represented by the athletes.

| Rank | Nation | Gold | Silver | Bronze | Total |
|---|---|---|---|---|---|
| 1 | Norway | 37 | 25 | 33 | 95 |
| 2 | Sweden | 20 | 18 | 14 | 52 |
| 3 | United States | 9 | 5 | 9 | 23 |
| 4 | Finland | 5 | 7 | 5 | 17 |
| 5 | France | 3 | 7 | 4 | 14 |
| 6 | Germany | 1 | 9 | 5 | 15 |
| 7 | Italy | 0 | 2 | 1 | 3 |
| 8 | Czech Republic | 0 | 1 | 0 | 1 |
| 8 | Great Britain | 0 | 1 | 0 | 1 |
| 10 | Switzerland | 0 | 0 | 3 | 3 |
| 11 | Austria | 0 | 0 | 1 | 1 |
| Totals (11 entries) | | 75 | 75 | 75 | 225 |

== Points distribution ==
The table shows the number of points to win in every competition in the 2023–24 Cross-Country Skiing World Cup for men and women.

| Place | 1 | 2 | 3 | 4 | 5 | 6 | 7 | 8 | 9 | 10 | 11 | 12 | 13 | 14 | 15 | 16 | 17 | 18 | 19 | 20 | 21 | 22 | 23 | 24 | 25 | 26 | 27 | 28 | 29 | 30 | 31 | 32 | 33 | 34 | 35 | 36 | 37 | 38 | 39 | 40 | 41 | 42 | 43 | 44 | 45 | 46 | 47 | 48 | 49 | 50 |
| Individual | 100 | 95 | 90 | 85 | 80 | 75 | 72 | 69 | 66 | 63 | 60 | 58 | 56 | 54 | 52 | 50 | 48 | 46 | 44 | 42 | 40 | 38 | 36 | 34 | 32 | 30 | 28 | 26 | 24 | 22 | 20 | 19 | 18 | 17 | 16 | 15 | 14 | 13 | 12 | 11 | 10 | 9 | 8 | 7 | 6 | 5 | 4 | 3 | 2 | 1 |
| Relay | 200 | 160 | 120 | 100 | 90 | 80 | 72 | 64 | 58 | 52 | 48 | 44 | 40 | 36 | 32 | 30 | 28 | 26 | 24 | 22 | 20 | 18 | 16 | 14 | 12 | 10 | 8 | 6 | 4 | 2 |
| Team sprint | 200 | 160 | 120 | 100 | 90 | 80 | 72 | 64 | 58 | 52 | 48 | 44 | 40 | 36 | 32 | 30 | 28 | 26 | 24 | 22 | 20 | 18 | 16 | 14 | 12 | 10 | 8 | 6 | 4 | 2 |
| Tour de Ski | 300 | 285 | 270 | 255 | 240 | 225 | 216 | 207 | 198 | 189 | 180 | 174 | 168 | 162 | 156 | 150 | 144 | 138 | 132 | 126 | 120 | 114 | 108 | 102 | 96 | 90 | 84 | 78 | 72 | 66 | 60 | 57 | 54 | 51 | 48 | 45 | 42 | 39 | 36 | 33 | 30 | 27 | 24 | 21 | 18 | 15 | 12 | 9 | 6 | 3 |
| Stage Tour de Ski | 50 | 47 | 44 | 41 | 38 | 35 | 32 | 30 | 28 | 26 | 24 | 22 | 20 | 18 | 16 | 15 | 14 | 13 | 12 | 11 | 10 | 9 | 8 | 7 | 6 | 5 | 4 | 3 | 2 | 1 |
| Bonus points (MSS checkpoints) | 15 | 12 | 10 | 8 | 6 | 5 | 4 | 3 | 2 | 1 |
| Sprint Q | 15 | 12 | 10 | 8 | 6 | 5 | 4 | 3 | 2 | 1 |

== Achievements ==
Only individual events.

First World Cup career victory

Men

- (Norway) Jan Thomas Jenssen (27), in his 4th season – the WC 3 (20 km mass start F) in Ruka; also first podium
- (Finland) Perttu Hyvärinen (32), in his 13th season – the WC 10 (10 km individual C) in Toblach; also first podium
- (France) Jules Lapierre (28), in his 6th season – the WC 10 (10 km mass start F) in Val di Fiemme; first podium was 2022–23 WC 11 (10 km mass start F) in Val di Fiemme
- (United States) Gus Schumacher (23), in his 5th season – the WC 20 (10 km individual F) in Minneapolis; also first podium

Women

- (Sweden) Moa Ilar (26), in her 6th season – the WC 3 (20 km mass start F) in Ruka; also first podium
- (Germany) Victoria Carl (28), in her 12th season – the WC 9 (10 km individual C) in Trondheim; first podium was 2023–24 WC 6 (10 km individual F) in Östersund
- (United States) Sophia Laukli (23), in her 4th season – the WC 10 (10 km mass start F) in Val di Fiemme; first podium was 2022–23 WC 11 (10 km mass start F) in Val di Fiemme

First World Cup podium

Men

- (Norway) Jan Thomas Jenssen (27), in his 4th season – the WC 3 (20 km mass start F) in Ruka – 1st place
- (Finland) Perttu Hyvärinen (32), in his 13th season – the WC 10 (10 km individual C) in Toblach – 1st place
- (United States) Gus Schumacher (23), in his 5th season – the WC 20 (10 km individual F) in Minneapolis – 1st place
- (Czech Republic) Michal Novák (27), in his 9th season – the WC 3 (20 km mass start F) in Ruka – 2nd place
- (France) Jules Chappaz (24), in his 5th season – the WC 10 (sprint F) in Toblach – 2nd place
- (Sweden) Edvin Anger (21), in his 2nd season – the WC 10 (sprint F) in Davos – 2nd place
- (Norway) Ansgar Evensen (23), in his 3rd season – the WC 12 (sprint C) in Oberhof – 2nd place
- (Finland) Lauri Vuorinen (29), in his 12th season – the WC 25 (sprint C) in Falun – 2nd place
- (Norway) Gjøran Tefre (29), in his 7th season – the WC 27 (20 km mass start F) in Falun – 2nd place
- (United States) JC Schoonmaker (23), in his 5th season – the WC 5 (sprint C) in Östersund – 3rd place
- (Norway) Henrik Dønnestad (27), in his 3rd season – the WC 9 (10 km individual C) in Trondheim – 3rd place
- (United States) Ben Ogden (23), in his 5th season – the WC 10 (sprint F) in Toblach – 3rd place
- (Switzerland) Cyril Fähndrich (24), in his 4th season – the WC 10 (15 km mass start C) in Val di Fiemme – 3rd place
- (France) Hugo Lapalus (25), in his 6th season – the WC 10 (10 km mass start F) in Val di Fiemme – 3rd place
- (Austria) Mika Vermeulen (24), in his 4th season – the WC 15 (15 km mass start F) in Canmore – 3rd place
- (Norway) Mattis Stenshagen (27), in his 7th season – the WC 17 (20 km mass start C) in Canmore – 3rd place
- (Switzerland) Valerio Grond (23), in his 4th season – the WC 22 (sprint F) in Lahti – 3rd place

Women

- (Sweden) Moa Ilar (26), in her 6th season – the WC 3 (20 km mass start F) in Ruka – 1st place
- (Germany) Coletta Rydzek (26), in her 6th season – the WC 22 (sprint F) in Lahti – 2nd place
- (Germany) Victoria Carl (28), in her 12th season – the WC 6 (10 km individual F) in Östersund – 3rd place

Number of wins this season (in brackets are all-time wins)

Men

- (Norway) Johannes Høsflot Klæbo – 16 (84) (Note: Men's all-time record in World Cup history)
- (Norway) Harald Østberg Amundsen – 4 (5)
- (Norway) Erik Valnes – 4 (5)
- (Norway) Pål Golberg – 2 (12)
- (France) Lucas Chanavat – 2 (4)
- (Norway) Simen Hegstad Krüger – 1 (10)
- (Norway) Martin Løwstrøm Nyenget – 1 (2)
- (Norway) Jan Thomas Jenssen – 1 (1)
- (Finland) Perttu Hyvärinen – 1 (1)
- (France) Jules Lapierre – 1 (1)
- (United States) Gus Schumacher – 1 (1)

Women

- (United States) Jessie Diggins – 7 (21)
- (Sweden) Linn Svahn – 6 (15)
- (Norway) Kristine Stavås Skistad – 5 (10)
- (Sweden) Frida Karlsson – 3 (11)
- (Finland) Kerttu Niskanen – 3 (8)
- (Sweden) Jonna Sundling – 2 (9)
- (Sweden) Ebba Andersson – 2 (7)
- (Sweden) Emma Ribom – 2 (4)
- (Finland) Krista Pärmäkoski – 1 (6)
- (Sweden) Moa Ilar – 1 (1)
- (Germany) Victoria Carl – 1 (1)
- (United States) Sophia Laukli – 1 (1)

== Retirements ==
Men

- (France) Maurice Manificat
- (Norway) Daniel Stock
- (United States) Scott Patterson
- (Finland) Verneri Poikonen
- (Norway) Sjur Røthe

Women

- (Poland) Karolina Kukuczka
- (Italy) Federica Sanfilippo
- (France) Coralie Bentz
- (Norway) Anna Svendsen
