= Olivier Léveillé =

Canadian cross-country skier

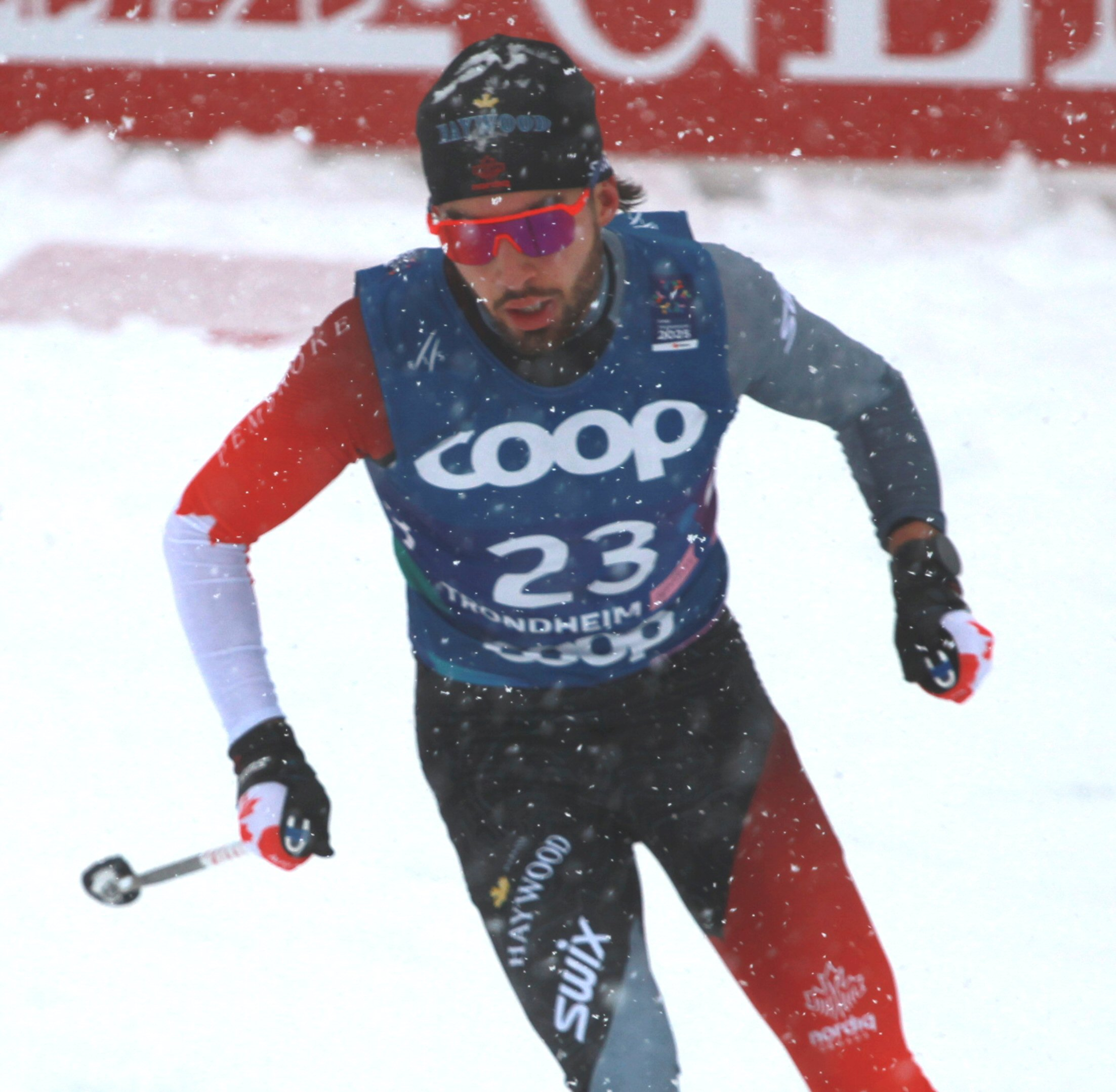

Personal information
- Nationality: Canada
- Born: 15 March 2001 (age 25) Sherbrooke, Quebec, Canada

Sport
- Sport: Skiing
- Club: Ski de fond Orford

World Cup career
- Seasons: 2 – (2022–present)
- Indiv. starts: 27
- Indiv. podiums: 0
- Team starts: 4
- Team podiums: 0
- Overall titles: 0 – (71st in 2022)
- Discipline titles: 0
Medal record
Men's cross-country skiing
Representing Canada
Junior World Championships
Silver medal – second place	2020 Oberwiesenthal	4 × 5 km relay
Bronze medal – third place	2021 Vuokatti	10 km freestyle
- Updated on 29 March 2023

Olivier Léveillé (born 15 March 2001) is a Canadian cross-country skier.

== Career ==
=== Junior ===
At the 2020 Nordic Junior World Ski Championships in Oberwiesenthal, Germany, Léveillé was part of the quartet who won silver in the 4 × 5 kilometre relay event, becoming the first Canadians to win a relay medal at the event. The following year Léveillé won bronze in the 10 kilometre freestyle event, becoming only the third Canadian to win an individual medal in the history of the event.

=== Senior ===
Léveillé made his senior debut as part of the 2021–22 FIS Cross-Country World Cup in Ruka, Finland. Léveillé's top placement was a 17th-place finish in the 15 km event (6th fastest time of the day).

On January 13, 2022, Léveillé was officially named to Canada's 2022 Olympic team.

== Cross-country skiing results ==
All results are sourced from the International Ski Federation (FIS).

=== Olympic Games ===
Year	Age	15 km individual	30 km skiathlon	50 km mass start	Sprint	4 × 10 km relay	Team sprint
2022	20	29	31	27^{[a]}	54	11	—

^{a} Distance reduced to 30 km due to weather conditions.

=== World Championships ===
Year	Age	15 km individual	30 km skiathlon	50 km mass start	Sprint	4 × 10 km relay	Team sprint
2023	21	28	43	23	—	5	—

=== World Cup ===
==== Season standings ====
Season	Age	Discipline standings				Ski Tour standings
Season	Age	Overall	Distance	Sprint	U23	Tour de Ski
2022	20	71	45	NC	9	—
2023	21	80	52	NC	12	32
