= FIS Nordic World Ski Championships 2023 – Men's 30 kilometre skiathlon =

Men's 30 kilometre skiathlon at the FIS Nordic World Ski Championships 2023
- Venue: Planica Nordic Centre
- Location: Planica, Slovenia
- Dates: 24 February
- Competitors: 66 from 28 nations
- Winning time: 1:09:40.3

Medalists
gold medal	Simen Hegstad Krüger	Norway
silver medal	Johannes Høsflot Klæbo	Norway
bronze medal	Sjur Røthe	Norway

The Men's 30 kilometre skiathlon competition at the FIS Nordic World Ski Championships 2023 was held on 24 February 2023.

== Results ==
The race was started at 15:30.

Rank	Bib	Athlete	Country	Time	Deficit
1st place, gold medalist(s)	4	Simen Hegstad Krüger	Norway	1:09:40.3	
2nd place, silver medalist(s)	1	Johannes Høsflot Klæbo	Norway	1:09:52.5	+12.2
3rd place, bronze medalist(s)	5	Sjur Røthe	Norway	1:09:54.4	+14.1
4	2	Pål Golberg	Norway	1:10:26.2	+45.9
5	3	William Poromaa	Sweden	1:10:26.7	+46.4
6	11	Calle Halfvarsson	Sweden	1:10:54.5	+1:14.2
7	6	Friedrich Moch	Germany	1:10:55.2	+1:14.9
8	10	Jules Lapierre	France	1:10:55.7	+1:15.4
9	12	Clément Parisse	France	1:10:56.8	+1:16.5
10	8	Perttu Hyvärinen	Finland	1:11:35.2	+1:54.9
11	13	Jens Burman	Sweden	1:11:40.5	+2:00.2
12	26	Irineu Esteve Altimiras	Andorra	1:11:41.8	+2:01.5
13	15	Iivo Niskanen	Finland	1:12:24.5	+2:44.2
14	7	Andrew Musgrave	Great Britain	1:12:45.8	+3:05.5
15	31	Jonas Dobler	Germany	1:12:45.8	+3:05.5
16	9	Hugo Lapalus	France	1:12:56.4	+3:16.1
17	35	Albert Kuchler	Germany	1:12:56.5	+3:16.2
18	39	Jonas Baumann	Switzerland	1:12:58.5	+3:18.2
19	14	Scott Patterson	United States	1:13:00.2	+3:19.9
20	18	Naoto Baba	Japan	1:13:19.2	+3:38.9
21	41	Adam Fellner	Czech Republic	1:13:51.6	+4:11.3
22	19	Remi Lindholm	Finland	1:14:11.3	+4:31.0
23	34	Ryo Hirose	Japan	1:14:11.9	+4:31.6
24	21	Hunter Wonders	United States	1:14:13.2	+4:32.9
25	43	Vitaliy Pukhkalo	Kazakhstan	1:14:22.9	+4:42.6
26	36	Giandomenico Salvadori	Italy	1:14:33.5	+4:53.2
27	20	Beda Klee	Switzerland	1:14:33.8	+4:53.5
28	47	Snorri Einarsson	Iceland	1:14:36.7	+4:56.4
29	22	Mika Vermeulen	Austria	1:14:56.2	+5:15.9
30	33	Thomas Maloney Westgård	Ireland	1:15:01.0	+5:20.7
31	30	Simone Dapra	Italy	1:15:02.2	+5:21.9
32	17	Eric Rosjö	Sweden	1:15:14.3	+5:34.0
33	25	Lucas Bögl	Germany	1:15:19.9	+5:39.6
34	27	Roman Furger	Switzerland	1:15:27.8	+5:47.5
35	42	Alvar Johannes Alev	Estonia	1:15:37.6	+5:57.3
36	40	Paul Constantin Pepene	Romania	1:15:49.5	+6:09.2
37	32	Russell Kennedy	Canada	1:16:25.5	+6:45.2
38	23	Gus Schumacher	United States	1:16:56.8	+7:16.5
39	54	Kaarel Kasper Kõrge	Estonia	1:16:59.0	+7:18.7
40	45	Joe Davies	Great Britain	1:16:59.6	+7:19.3
41	44	Nail Bashmakov	Kazakhstan	1:16:59.7	+7:19.4
42	49	Miha Ličef	Slovenia	1:17:35.3	+7:55.0
43	24	Olivier Léveillé	Canada	1:17:45.6	+8:05.3
44	50	Xavier McKeever	Canada	1:18:21.1	+8:40.8
45	29	Cyril Fähndrich	Switzerland	1:19:58.1	+10:17.8
46	46	Vladislav Kovalyov	Kazakhstan	Lapped	
47	52	Sebastian Bryja	Poland	Lapped	
48	57	Dmytro Drahun	Ukraine	Lapped	
49	63	Robin Frommelt	Liechtenstein	Lapped	
50	56	Franco Dal Farra	Argentina	Lapped	
51	48	Yernur Bexultan	Kazakhstan	Lapped	
52	53	Seve De Campo	Australia	Lapped	
53	60	Boštjan Korošec	Slovenia	Lapped	
54	66	Fredrik Fodstad	Colombia	Lapped	
55	59	Ruslan Denysenko	Ukraine	Lapped	
56	65	Philipp Bellingham	Australia	Lapped	
57	37	Takanori Ebina	Japan	Lapped	
58	62	Jošt Mulej	Slovenia	Lapped	
59	64	Izidor Karničar	Slovenia	Lapped	
60	55	Todor Malchov	Bulgaria	Lapped	
61	61	Andrej Renda	Slovakia	Lapped	
	16	Antoine Cyr	Canada	Did not finish	
	28	Arsi Ruuskanen	Finland	Did not finish	
	38	Paolo Ventura	Italy	Did not finish	
	51	Simeon Deyanov	Bulgaria	Did not finish	
	58	Oleksandr Lisohor	Ukraine	Did not finish	
