= Jens Burman =

Swedish cross-country skier (born 1994)

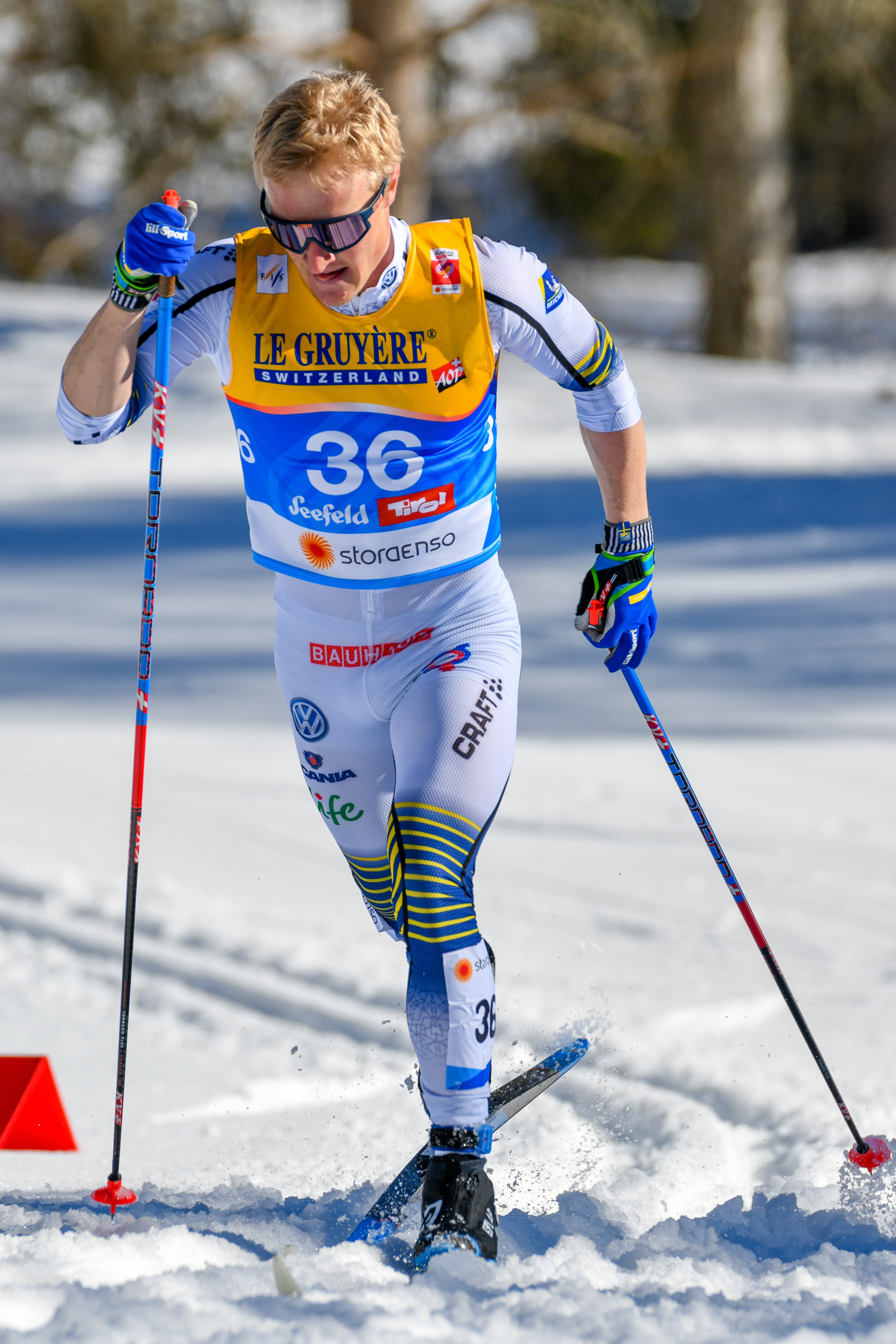
- Jens Burman during the World Championships in Seefeld in Tirol, Austria in February 2019

Personal information
- Full name: Jens Tony Lennart Burman
- Nationality: Sweden
- Born: 16 August 1994 (age 31) Östersund, Sweden

Sport
- Sport: Skiing
- Club: Åsarna IK

World Cup career
- Seasons: 10 – (2015–present)
- Indiv. starts: 115
- Indiv. podiums: 1
- Indiv. wins: 0
- Team starts: 12
- Team podiums: 1
- Team wins: 1
- Overall titles: 0 – (11th in 2024)
- Discipline titles: 0
Medal record
Men's cross-country skiing
Representing Sweden
World Championships
Bronze medal – third place	2025 Trondheim	4 × 7.5 km relay
U23 World Championships
Gold medal – first place	2016 Râșnov	15 km classical
Junior World Championships
Silver medal – second place	2014 Val di Fiemme	10 km classical
- Updated on 26 January 2024

Jens Burman (born 16 August 1994) is a Swedish cross-country skier who competes internationally.

He competed for Sweden at the FIS Nordic World Ski Championships 2017 in Lahti, Finland.

== Cross-country skiing results ==
All results are sourced from the International Ski Federation (FIS).

=== Olympic Games ===
Year	Age	15 km individual	30 km skiathlon	50 km mass start	Sprint	4 × 10 km relay	Team sprint
2018	23	19	17	28	—	5	—
2022	27	8	24	16^{[a]}	—	4	—

^{a} Distance reduced to 30 km due to weather conditions.

=== World Championships ===
Year	Age	15 km individual	30 km skiathlon	50 km mass start	Sprint	4 × 10 km relay	Team sprint
2017	22	14	22	15	—	—	—
2019	24	11	10	10	—	5	—
2021	26	8	11	5	—	4	—
2023	28	21	11	8	—	6	—

=== World Cup ===
==== Season standings ====
Season	Age	Discipline standings				Ski Tour standings				
Season	Age	Overall	Distance	Sprint	U23	Nordic Opening	Tour de Ski	Ski Tour 2020	World Cup Final	Ski Tour Canada
2015	20	NC	NC	—	NC	—	—	—N/a	—N/a	—N/a
2016	21	96	56	NC	11	58	38	—N/a	—N/a	32
2017	22	26	20	NC	2nd place, silver medalist(s)	—	16	—N/a	—	—N/a
2018	23	83	52	NC	—N/a	42	DNF	—N/a	36	—N/a
2019	24	42	25	NC	—N/a	26	—	—N/a	40	—N/a
2020	25	14	12	NC	—N/a	14	12	16	—N/a	—N/a
2021	26	33	20	—	—N/a	—	—	—N/a	—N/a	—N/a
2022	27	104	58	—	—N/a	—N/a	—	—N/a	—N/a	—N/a
2023	28	43	23	—	—N/a	—N/a	—	—N/a	—N/a	—N/a
2024	29	11	12	NC	—N/a	—N/a	8	—N/a	—N/a	—N/a
2025	30	28	21	NC	—N/a	—N/a	25	—N/a	—N/a	—N/a

==== Individual podiums ====
- 1 podium – (1 WC)

No.	Season	Date	Location	Race	Level	Place
1	2020–21	14 March 2021	Engadin, Switzerland	50 km Pursuit F	World Cup	3rd

==== Team podiums ====
- 1 victory – (1 RL)
- 1 podium – (1 RL)

No.	Season	Date	Location	Race	Level	Place	Teammates
1	2023–24	26 January 2024	Goms, Switzerland	4 × 5 km Mixed Relay C/F	World Cup	1st	Poromaa / Karlsson / Svahn
