= Clément Parisse =

French cross-country skier (born 1993)

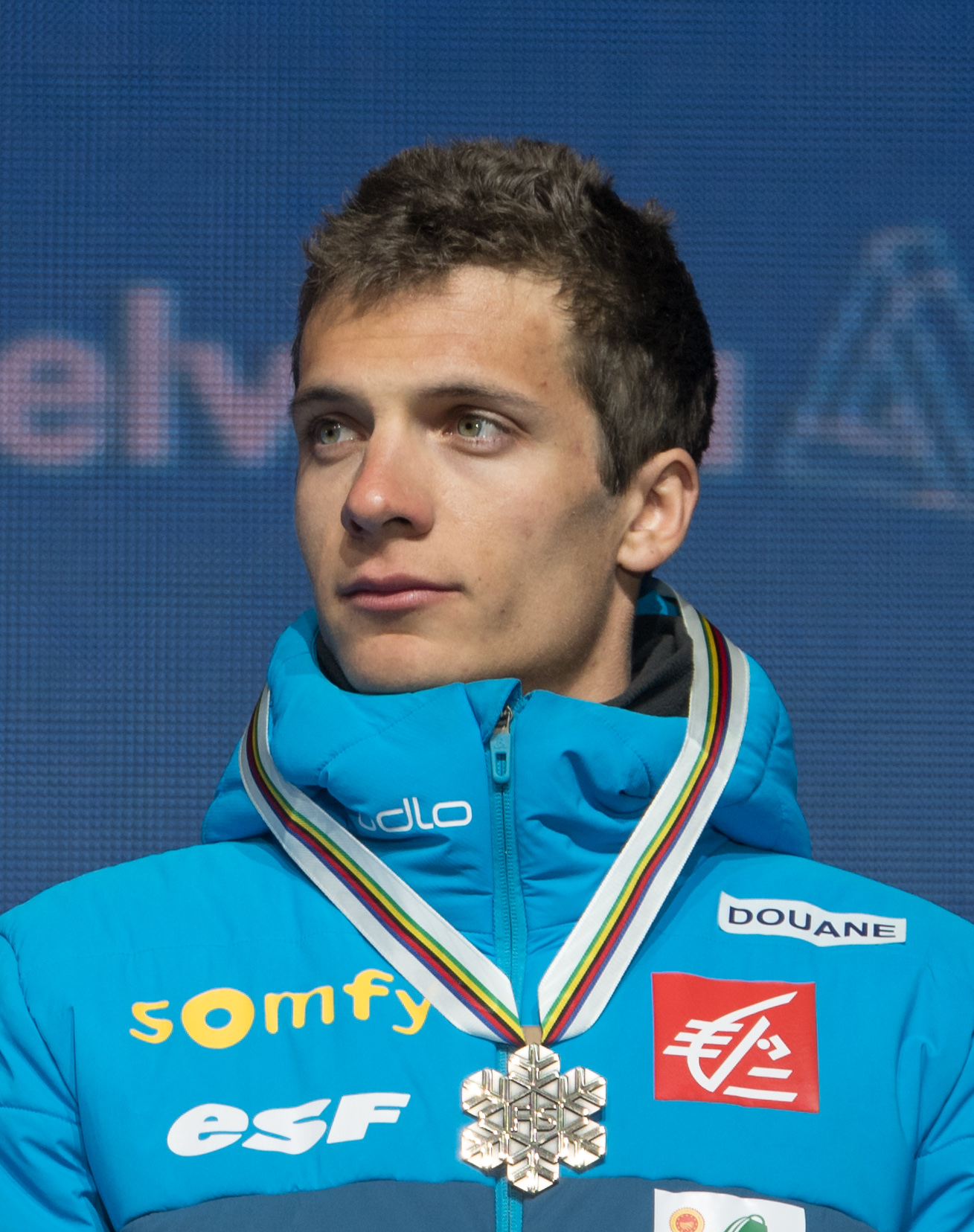
- Parisse in 2019

Personal information
- Nationality: France
- Born: 6 July 1993 (age 33) Évry, France
- Height: 1.78 m (5 ft 10 in)

Sport
- Sport: Skiing
- Club: Club des Sports de Megève

World Cup career
- Seasons: 10 – (2014–present)
- Indiv. starts: 125
- Indiv. podiums: 0
- Team starts: 8
- Team podiums: 1
- Team wins: 0
- Overall titles: 0 – (22nd in 2021)
- Discipline titles: 0
Medal record
Men's cross-country skiing
Representing France
Olympic Games
Bronze medal – third place	2018 Pyeongchang	4 × 10 km relay
Bronze medal – third place	2022 Beijing	4 × 10 km relay
World Championships
Bronze medal – third place	2019 Seefeld	4 × 10 km relay
Bronze medal – third place	2021 Oberstdorf	4 × 10 km relay
U23 World Championships
Silver medal – second place	2015 Almaty	30 km skiathlon
Silver medal – second place	2016 Râșnov	15 km freestyle
- Updated on 28 March 2023

Clément Parisse (French pronunciation: [klemɑ̃ paʁis]; born 6 July 1993) is a French cross-country skier. He has competed in the World Cup since the 2014 season. He represented France at the FIS Nordic World Ski Championships 2015 in Falun, Sweden.

== Cross-country skiing results ==
All results are sourced from the International Ski Federation (FIS).

=== Olympic Games ===
- 2 medals – (2 bronze)

Year	Age	15 km individual	30 km skiathlon	50 km mass start	Sprint	4 × 10 km relay	Team sprint
2018	24	26	13	24	—	Bronze	—
2022	28	—	10	7^{[a]}	—	Bronze	—

^{a} Distance reduced to 30 km due to weather conditions.

=== World Championships ===
- 2 medals – (2 bronze)

Year	Age	15 km individual	30 km skiathlon	50 km mass start	Sprint	4 × 10 km relay	Team sprint
2015	21	24	24	—	—	—	—
2017	23	—	32	16	—	7	—
2019	25	—	5	19	—	Bronze	—
2021	27	14	12	13	—	Bronze	—
2023	29	10	9	17	—	4	—

=== World Cup ===
==== Season standings ====
Season	Age	Discipline standings				Ski Tour standings				
Season	Age	Overall	Distance	Sprint	U23	Nordic Opening	Tour de Ski	Ski Tour 2020	World Cup Final	Ski Tour Canada
2014	21	NC	NC	—	—N/a	—	—	—N/a	—	—N/a
2015	22	153	93	—	26	80	—	—N/a	—N/a	—N/a
2016	23	NC	NC	—	NC	64	—	—N/a	—N/a	—
2017	24	44	32	NC	—N/a	—	23	—N/a	39	—N/a
2018	25	53	31	NC	—N/a	—	DNF	—N/a	34	—N/a
2019	26	34	23	NC	—N/a	18	27	—N/a	28	—N/a
2020	27	29	19	67	—N/a	42	21	20	—N/a	—N/a
2021	28	22	22	NC	—N/a	41	9	—N/a	—N/a	—N/a
2022	29	33	23	NC	—N/a	—N/a	22	—N/a	—N/a	—N/a
2023	30	29	19	NC	—N/a	—N/a	15	—N/a	—N/a	—N/a

==== Team podiums ====
- 1 podium – (1 RL)

No.	Season	Date	Location	Race	Level	Place	Teammates
1	2016–17	18 December 2016	La Clusaz, France	4 × 7.5 km Relay C/F	World Cup	3rd	Gaillard / Jeannerod / Manificat
