= Scott Patterson (skier, born 1992) =

American cross-country skier (born 1992)

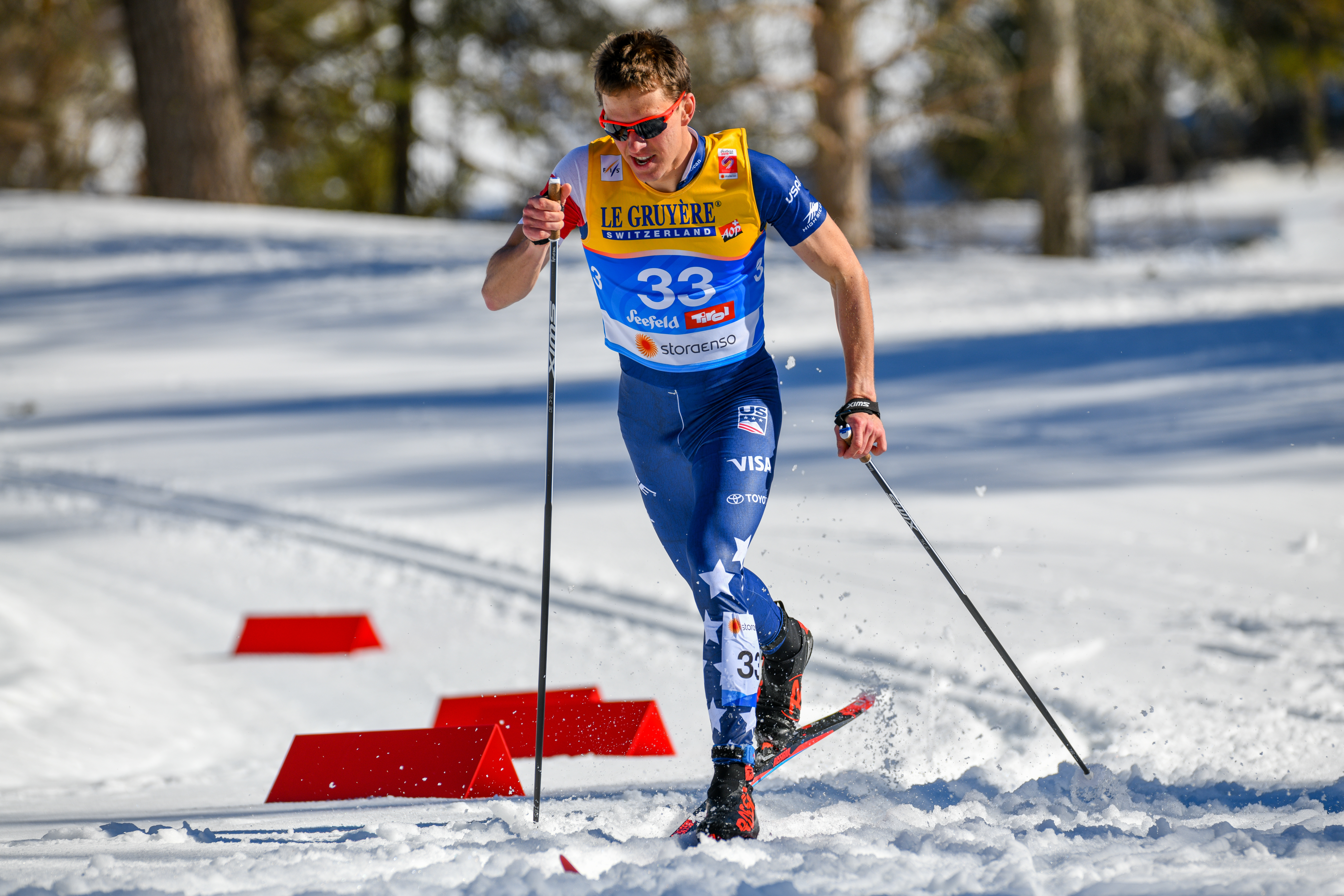
- Scott Patterson during the World Championships in Seefeld in Tirol, Austria, in February 2019

Personal information
- Nationality: United States
- Born: January 28, 1992 (age 34) McCall, Idaho

Sport
- Sport: Skiing
- Club: Alaska Pacific University Nordic Center

World Cup career
- Seasons: 8 – (2016–present)
- Indiv. starts: 95
- Indiv. podiums: 0
- Team starts: 9
- Team podiums: 1
- Team wins: 1
- Overall titles: 0 – (32nd in 2023)
- Discipline titles: 0
- Updated on 29 March 2023

Scott Patterson (born January 28, 1992) is an American cross-country skier. He competed in the 2018 Winter Olympics and 2022 Winter Olympics. He skied for South Anchorage High School, where he was a three-time Alaska State skimeister. He then skied for the University of Vermont along with his sister, Caitlin. Currently, he represents Alaska Pacific University professionally and the US Ski Team. Most recently, he placed 10th at the World Championships 50k Classic race in Obersdorf, Germany.

== Cross-country skiing results ==
All results are sourced from the International Ski Federation (FIS).

=== Olympic Games ===
Year	Age	15 km individual	30 km skiathlon	50 km mass start	Sprint	4 × 10 km relay	Team sprint
2018	26	21	18	11	—	13	—
2022	30	38	11	8^{[a]}	—	9	—

^{a} Distance reduced to 30 km due to weather conditions.

=== World Championships ===
Year	Age	15 km individual	30 km skiathlon	50 km mass start	Sprint	4 × 10 km relay	Team sprint
2019	27	30	30	23	—	9	—
2021	29	27	14	10	—	8	—
2023	31	15	19	16	—	7	—

=== World Cup ===
==== Season standings ====
Season	Age	Discipline standings			Ski Tour standings				
Season	Age	Overall	Distance	Sprint	Nordic Opening	Tour de Ski	Ski Tour 2020	World Cup Final	Ski Tour Canada
2016	24	NC	NC	NC	—	—	—N/a	—N/a	46
2017	25	95	62	NC	—	—	—N/a	41	—N/a
2018	26	103	71	NC	55	—	—N/a	57	—N/a
2019	27	119	82	NC	60	—	—N/a	45	—N/a
2020	28	NC	NC	NC	69	—	—	—N/a	—N/a
2021	29	60	44	NC	42	37	—N/a	—N/a	—N/a
2022	30	84	47	—	—N/a	—	—N/a	—N/a	—N/a
2023	31	32	21	NC	—N/a	22	—N/a	—N/a	—N/a

==== Team podiums ====
- 1 victory – (1 RL)
- 1 podium – (1 RL)

No.	Season	Date	Location	Race	Level	Place	Teammates
1	2021-22	13 March 2022	Falun, Sweden	4 × 5 km Mixed Relay F	World Cup	1st	Brennan / Ketterson / Diggins
