= FIS Nordic World Ski Championships 2019 – Men's 50 kilometre freestyle =

Men's 50 kilometre freestyle at the FIS Nordic World Ski Championships 2019
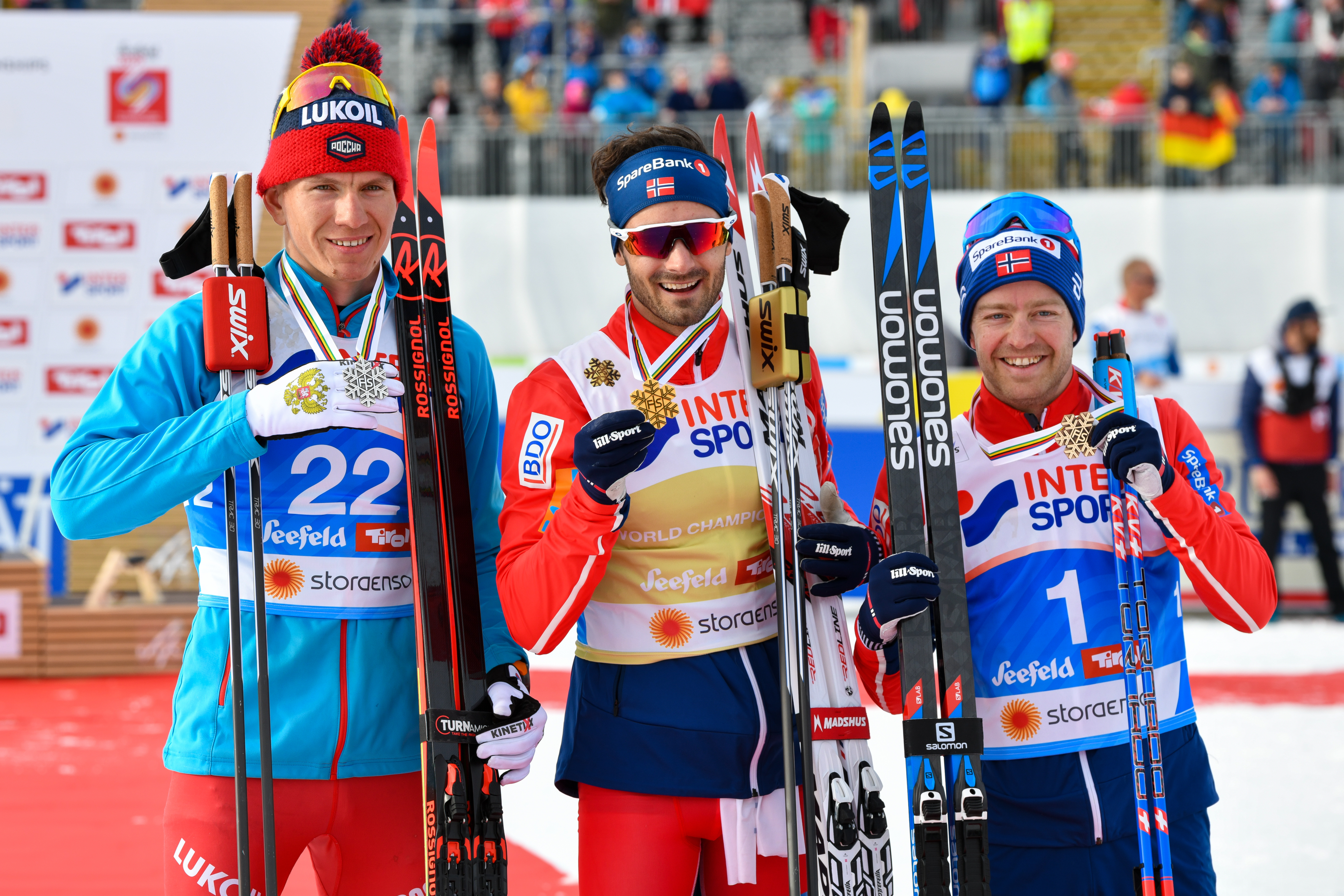
- Location: Seefeld in Tirol, Austria
- Date: 3 March
- Competitors: 63 from 26 nations
- Winning time: 1:49:59.3

Medalists
| gold medal | Hans Christer Holund | Norway |
| silver medal | Alexander Bolshunov | Russia |
| bronze medal | Sjur Røthe | Norway |

The Men's 50 kilometre freestyle competition at the FIS Nordic World Ski Championships 2019 was held on 3 March 2019.

== Results ==
The race was started at 13:00.

| Rank | Bib | Athlete | Country | Time | Deficit |
|---|---|---|---|---|---|
| 1st place, gold medalist(s) | 8 | Hans Christer Holund | Norway | 1:49:59.3 | |
| 2nd place, silver medalist(s) | 22 | Alexander Bolshunov | Russia | 1:50:27.1 | +27.8 |
| 3rd place, bronze medalist(s) | 1 | Sjur Røthe | Norway | 1:50:57.1 | +57.8 |
| 4 | 2 | Martin Johnsrud Sundby | Norway | 1:50:57.2 | +57.9 |
| 5 | 3 | Simen Hegstad Krüger | Norway | 1:51:00.4 | +1:01.1 |
| 6 | 10 | Calle Halfvarsson | Sweden | 1:51:01.9 | +1:02.6 |
| 7 | 13 | Dario Cologna | Switzerland | 1:51:03.3 | +1:04.0 |
| 8 | 11 | Andrew Musgrave | Great Britain | 1:51:03.8 | +1:04.5 |
| 9 | 16 | Adrien Backscheider | France | 1:51:05.7 | +1:06.4 |
| 10 | 20 | Jens Burman | Sweden | 1:51:07.1 | +1:07.8 |
| 11 | 29 | Matti Heikkinen | Finland | 1:51:08.0 | +1:08.7 |
| 12 | 14 | Alex Harvey | Canada | 1:51:09.8 | +1:10.5 |
| 13 | 4 | Andrey Melnichenko | Russia | 1:51:10.1 | +1:10.8 |
| 14 | 7 | Francesco De Fabiani | Italy | 1:51:11.4 | +1:12.1 |
| 15 | 17 | Daniel Rickardsson | Sweden | 1:51:12.7 | +1:13.4 |
| 16 | 18 | Keishin Yoshida | Japan | 1:51:13.6 | +1:14.3 |
| 17 | 23 | Jonas Dobler | Germany | 1:51:13.9 | +1:14.6 |
| 18 | 52 | Snorri Einarsson | Iceland | 1:51:14.9 | +1:15.6 |
| 19 | 12 | Clément Parisse | France | 1:51:20.4 | +1:21.1 |
| 20 | 30 | David Norris | United States | 1:51:21.9 | +1:22.6 |
| 21 | 31 | Naoto Baba | Japan | 1:51:48.8 | +1:49.5 |
| 22 | 15 | Florian Notz | Germany | 1:51:58.8 | +1:59.5 |
| 23 | 26 | Scott Patterson | United States | 1:52:04.8 | +2:05.5 |
| 24 | 24 | Toni Livers | Switzerland | 1:52:06.6 | +2:07.3 |
| 25 | 5 | Evgeniy Belov | Russia | 1:52:07.0 | +2:07.7 |
| 26 | 19 | Giandomenico Salvadori | Italy | 1:52:07.4 | +2:08.1 |
| 27 | 21 | Robin Duvillard | France | 1:52:17.1 | +2:17.8 |
| 28 | 6 | Denis Spitsov | Russia | 1:52:18.1 | +2:18.8 |
| 29 | 28 | Irineu Esteve Altimiras | Andorra | 1:52:44.5 | +2:45.2 |
| 30 | 45 | Bernhard Tritscher | Austria | 1:52:54.7 | +2:55.4 |
| 31 | 25 | Lucas Bögl | Germany | 1:53:22.0 | +3:22.7 |
| 32 | 9 | Maurice Manificat | France | 1:53:33.5 | +3:34.2 |
| 33 | 44 | Yury Astapenka | Belarus | 1:53:52.8 | +3:53.5 |
| 34 | 41 | Simi Hamilton | United States | 1:54:01.3 | +4:02.0 |
| 35 | 35 | Lari Lehtonen | Finland | 1:54:14.1 | +4:14.8 |
| 36 | 40 | Michal Novák | Czech Republic | 1:54:34.7 | +4:35.4 |
| 37 | 48 | Yevgeniy Velichko | Kazakhstan | 1:54:44.5 | +4:45.2 |
| 38 | 47 | Andrew Young | Great Britain | 1:54:59.0 | +4:59.7 |
| 39 | 50 | Antti Ojansivu | Finland | 1:54:59.1 | +4:59.8 |
| 40 | 55 | Imanol Rojo | Spain | 1:55:03.1 | +5:03.8 |
| 41 | 27 | Stefano Gardener | Italy | 1:55:08.9 | +5:09.6 |
| 42 | 32 | Perttu Hyvärinen | Finland | 1:56:39.6 | +6:40.3 |
| 43 | 39 | Andreas Katz | Germany | 1:56:56.4 | +6:57.1 |
| 44 | 38 | Björn Sandström | Sweden | 1:57:20.4 | +7:21.1 |
| 45 | 33 | Adam Martin | United States | 1:58:01.0 | +8:01.7 |
| 46 | 49 | Russell Kennedy | Canada | 1:59:56.9 | +9:57.6 |
| 47 | 43 | Evan Palmer-Charrette | Canada | 2:01:25.4 | +11:26.1 |
| 48 | 46 | Petr Knop | Czech Republic | 2:01:26.2 | +11:26.9 |
| 49 | 51 | Raido Ränkel | Estonia | 2:01:26.3 | +11:27.0 |
| 50 | 53 | Scott James Hill | Canada | 2:01:26.9 | +11:27.6 |
| 51 | 42 | Kaichi Naruse | Japan | 2:01:35.5 | +11:36.2 |
| 52 | 34 | Mirco Bertolina | Italy | 2:01:37.8 | +11:38.5 |
| 53 | 37 | Roman Furger | Switzerland | 2:03:10.4 | +13:11.1 |
| 54 | 58 | Daulet Rakhimbayev | Kazakhstan | 2:03:12.9 | +13:13.6 |
| 55 | 62 | Thomas Hjalmar Westgård | Ireland | 2:04:27.4 | +14:28.1 |
| 56 | 57 | Mika Vermeulen | Austria | 2:05:36.8 | +15:37.5 |
| 57 | 60 | Indulis Bikše | Latvia | 2:05:44.2 | +15:44.9 |
| 58 | 63 | Bao Lin | China | 2:06:37.0 | +16:37.7 |
| 59 | 56 | Ruslan Perekhoda | Ukraine | 2:08:12.6 | +18:13.3 |
| 60 | 61 | Martin Vögeli | Liechtenstein | 2:09:07.2 | +19:07.9 |
| 61 | 59 | Kaarel Kasper Kõrge | Estonia | 2:10:01.4 | +20:02.1 |
| 62 | 65 | Alex Vanias | Greece | 2:13:55.5 | +23:56.2 |
| | 64 | Shang Jincai | China | Did not finish | |
| | 36 | Vitaliy Pukhkalo | Kazakhstan | Did not start | |
| | 54 | Miroslav Rypl | Czech Republic | Did not start | |
