= FIS Nordic World Ski Championships 2021 – Men's 30 kilometre skiathlon =

Men's 30 kilometre skiathlon at the FIS Nordic World Ski Championships 2021
- Location: Oberstdorf, Germany
- Date: 27 February
- Competitors: 76 from 31 nations
- Winning time: 1:11:33.9

Medalists
gold medal	Alexander Bolshunov
silver medal	Simen Hegstad Krüger	Norway
bronze medal	Hans Christer Holund	Norway

The Men's 30 kilometre skiathlon competition at the FIS Nordic World Ski Championships 2021 was held on 27 February 2021.

== Results ==
The race was started at 13:30.

Rank	Bib	Athlete	Country	Time	Deficit
1st place, gold medalist(s)	1	Alexander Bolshunov	Russian Ski Federation	1:11:33.9	
2nd place, silver medalist(s)	9	Simen Hegstad Krüger	Norway	1:11:35.0	+1.1
3rd place, bronze medalist(s)	10	Hans Christer Holund	Norway	1:11:35.6	+1.7
4	12	Johannes Høsflot Klæbo	Norway	1:11:55.4	+21.5
5	5	Emil Iversen	Norway	1:11:56.0	+22.1
6	4	Sjur Røthe	Norway	1:12:21.2	+47.3
7	8	Andrew Musgrave	Great Britain	1:13:07.2	+1:33.3
8	2	Ivan Yakimushkin	Russian Ski Federation	1:13:34.2	+2:00.3
9	18	William Poromaa	Sweden	1:13:34.3	+2:00.4
10	6	Dario Cologna	Switzerland	1:13:34.7	+2:00.8
11	19	Jens Burman	Sweden	1:13:35.8	+2:01.9
12	14	Clément Parisse	France	1:13:36.2	+2:02.3
13	15	Iivo Niskanen	Finland	1:13:37.1	+2:03.2
14	38	Scott Patterson	United States	1:13:37.2	+2:03.3
15	27	Jason Rüesch	Switzerland	1:13:38.0	+2:04.1
16	36	Jules Lapierre	France	1:13:38.2	+2:04.3
17	52	David Norris	United States	1:13:53.7	+2:19.8
18	7	Aleksey Chervotkin	Russian Ski Federation	1:14:23.4	+2:49.5
19	35	Imanol Rojo	Spain	1:14:23.5	+2:49.6
20	22	Jonas Baumann	Switzerland	1:15:04.9	+3:31.0
21	21	Irineu Esteve Altimiras	Andorra	1:15:10.0	+3:36.1
22	29	Stefano Gardener	Italy	1:15:34.8	+4:00.9
23	3	Evgeniy Belov	Russian Ski Federation	1:15:35.1	+4:01.2
24	26	Giandomenico Salvadori	Italy	1:15:35.3	+4:01.4
25	25	Naoto Baba	Japan	1:15:35.4	+4:01.5
26	46	Adam Fellner	Czech Republic	1:15:35.5	+4:01.6
27	42	Antoine Cyr	Canada	1:15:35.8	+4:01.9
28	23	Jean-Marc Gaillard	France	1:15:39.5	+4:05.6
29	16	Lucas Bögl	Germany	1:15:44.1	+4:10.2
30	39	Candide Pralong	Switzerland	1:15:44.4	+4:10.5
31	41	Hunter Wonders	United States	1:15:59.6	+4:25.7
32	30	Thomas Hjalmar Westgård	Ireland	1:16:08.3	+4:34.4
33	34	Simone Daprà	Italy	1:16:28.8	+4:54.9
34	33	Markus Vuorela	Finland	1:16:29.5	+4:55.6
35	55	Keishin Yoshida	Japan	1:16:29.6	+4:55.7
36	17	Jonas Dobler	Germany	1:16:34.0	+5:00.1
37	45	Petr Knop	Czech Republic	1:16:34.2	+5:00.3
38	28	Friedrich Moch	Germany	1:16:34.5	+5:00.6
39	57	Rémi Drolet	Canada	1:16:36.3	+5:02.4
40	24	Björn Sandström	Sweden	1:16:37.2	+5:03.3
41	31	Paolo Ventura	Italy	1:17:22.8	+5:48.9
42	51	Raimo Vīgants	Latvia	1:17:33.2	+5:59.3
43	53	Juho Mikkonen	Finland	1:17:34.5	+6:00.6
44	63	Takatsugu Uda	Japan	1:17:40.3	+6:06.4
45	58	Ben Ogden	United States	1:18:01.3	+6:27.4
46	47	Yevgeniy Velichko	Kazakhstan	1:18:11.9	+6:38.0
47	32	Vitaliy Pukhkalo	Kazakhstan	1:19:02.9	+7:29.0
48	13	Florian Notz	Germany	1:19:13.9	+7:40.0
49	37	Paul Constantin Pepene	Romania	1:19:14.6	+7:40.7
50	71	Kaarel Kasper Kõrge	Estonia	1:19:18.4	+7:44.5
51	50	Philippe Boucher	Canada	1:19:20.0	+7:46.1
52	43	Lauri Lepistö	Finland	1:19:21.9	+7:48.0
53	48	Jonáš Bešťák	Czech Republic	1:19:43.3	+8:09.4
54	59	Johannes Alev	Estonia	1:20:39.3	+9:05.4
55	61	Mateusz Haratyk	Poland	1:20:39.6	+9:05.7
56	56	Nail Bashmakov	Kazakhstan	1:20:41.1	+9:07.2
57	44	Snorri Einarsson	Iceland	1:21:12.7	+9:38.8
58	54	Ján Koristek	Slovakia	1:22:11.1	+10:37.2
59	62	Mikayel Mikayelyan	Armenia	Lapped	
60	69	Kacper Antolec	Poland	Lapped	
61	75	Phillip Bellingham	Australia	Lapped	
62	68	Tadevos Poghosyan	Armenia	Lapped	
63	66	Jeong Jong-won	South Korea	Lapped	
64	74	Franco Dal Farra	Argentina	Lapped	
65	76	Mark Pollock	Australia	Lapped	
66	70	Dmytro Drahun	Ukraine	Lapped	
67	60	Strahinja Erić	Bosnia and Herzegovina	Lapped	
68	73	Todor Malchov	Bulgaria	Lapped	
69	64	Miloš Milosavljević	Serbia	Lapped	
70	72	Miloš Čolić	Bosnia and Herzegovina	Lapped	
	11	Hugo Lapalus	France	Did not finish	
	20	Calle Halfvarsson	Sweden	Did not finish	
	40	Olzhas Klimin	Kazakhstan	Did not finish	
	49	Russell Kennedy	Canada	Did not finish	
	65	Ruslan Perekhoda	Ukraine	Did not finish	
	67	Simeon Deyanov	Bulgaria	Did not finish	
