= FIS Nordic World Ski Championships 2023 – Men's 4 × 10 kilometre relay =

Men's 4 × 10 kilometre relay at the FIS Nordic World Ski Championships 2023
- Venue: Planica Nordic Centre
- Location: Planica, Slovenia
- Dates: 3 March
- Competitors: 60 from 15 nations
- Teams: 15
- Winning time: 1:32:54.7

Medalists
gold medal	Hans Christer Holund; Pål Golberg; Simen Hegstad Krüger; Johannes Høsflot Klæbo	Norway
silver medal	Ristomatti Hakola; Iivo Niskanen; Perttu Hyvärinen; Niko Anttola	Finland
bronze medal	Albert Kuchler; Janosch Brugger; Jonas Dobler; Friedrich Moch	Germany

The Men's 4 × 10 kilometre relay competition at the FIS Nordic World Ski Championships 2023 was held on 3 March 2023.

== Results ==
The race was started at 12:29.

Rank	Bib	Country	Time	Deficit
1st place, gold medalist(s)	1	Norway; Hans Christer Holund; Pål Golberg; Simen Hegstad Krüger; Johannes Høsflot Klæbo	1:32:54.7; 24:34.9; 24:16.7; 21:32.4; 22:30.7	
2nd place, silver medalist(s)	5	Finland; Ristomatti Hakola; Iivo Niskanen; Perttu Hyvärinen; Niko Anttola	1:33:41.6; 25:01.0; 24:14.7; 22:09.5; 22:16.4	+46.9
3rd place, bronze medalist(s)	4	Germany; Albert Kuchler; Janosch Brugger; Jonas Dobler; Friedrich Moch	1:33:54.5; 25:03.0; 25:09.7; 21:44.5; 21:57.3	+59.8
4	2	France; Richard Jouve; Hugo Lapalus; Clément Parisse; Jules Lapierre	1:33:55.2; 25:00.6; 24:53.8; 22:02.1; 21:58.7	+1:00.5
5	10	Canada; Xavier McKeever; Antoine Cyr; Graham Ritchie; Olivier Léveillé	1:34:17.2; 25:01.7; 24:53.7; 22:00.4; 22:21.4	+1:22.5
6	3	Sweden; Johan Häggström; Jens Burman; William Poromaa; Calle Halfvarsson	1:34:31.4; 25:02.2; 24:52.9; 22:01.7; 22:34.6	+1:36.7
7	8	United States; Ben Ogden; Hunter Wonders; Scott Patterson; Gus Schumacher	1:36:05.4; 25:01.4; 26:02.7; 22:16.7; 22:44.6	+3:10.7
8	6	Switzerland; Beda Klee; Jonas Baumann; Candide Pralong; Cyril Fähndrich	1:36:57.6; 25:00.1; 24:55.3; 23:17.0; 23:45.2	+4:02.9
9	7	Italy; Dietmar Nöckler; Francesco De Fabiani; Paolo Ventura; Federico Pellegrino	1:38:11.9; 25:34.2; 25:53.3; 23:18.4; 23:26.0	+5:17.2
10	9	Japan; Ryo Hirose; Takanori Ebina; Naoto Baba; Haruki Yamashita	25:14.4; 26:58.2; 23:11.7; 23:39.0	+6:08.6
11	12	Slovenia; Miha Šimenc; Miha Ličef; Vili Črv; Boštjan Korošec	1:39:37.6; 25:02.7; 25:46.2; 24:10.2; 24:38.5	+6:42.9
12	13	Estonia; Martin Himma; Marko Kilp; Alvar Johannes Alev; Kaarel Kasper Kõrge	1:40:12.0; 26:31.6; 26:57.2; 23:33.1; 23:10.1	+7:17.3
13	15	Kazakhstan; Nail Bashmakov; Vitaliy Pukhkalo; Olzhas Klimin; Yernur Bexultan	1:42:10.5; 26:30.0; 25:52.2; 24:08.1; 25:40.2	+9:15.8
14	14	Latvia; Raimo Vīgants; Niks Saulītis; Lauris Kaparkalējs; Rainers Paeglis	LAP; 26:30.1; 29:28.6	
15	11	Czech Republic; Tomáš Dufek; Luděk Šeller; Tomáš Lukeš; Kryštof Zatloukal	LAP; 28:46.1; 28:09.0	
