= Erwan Käser =

Swiss cross-country skier

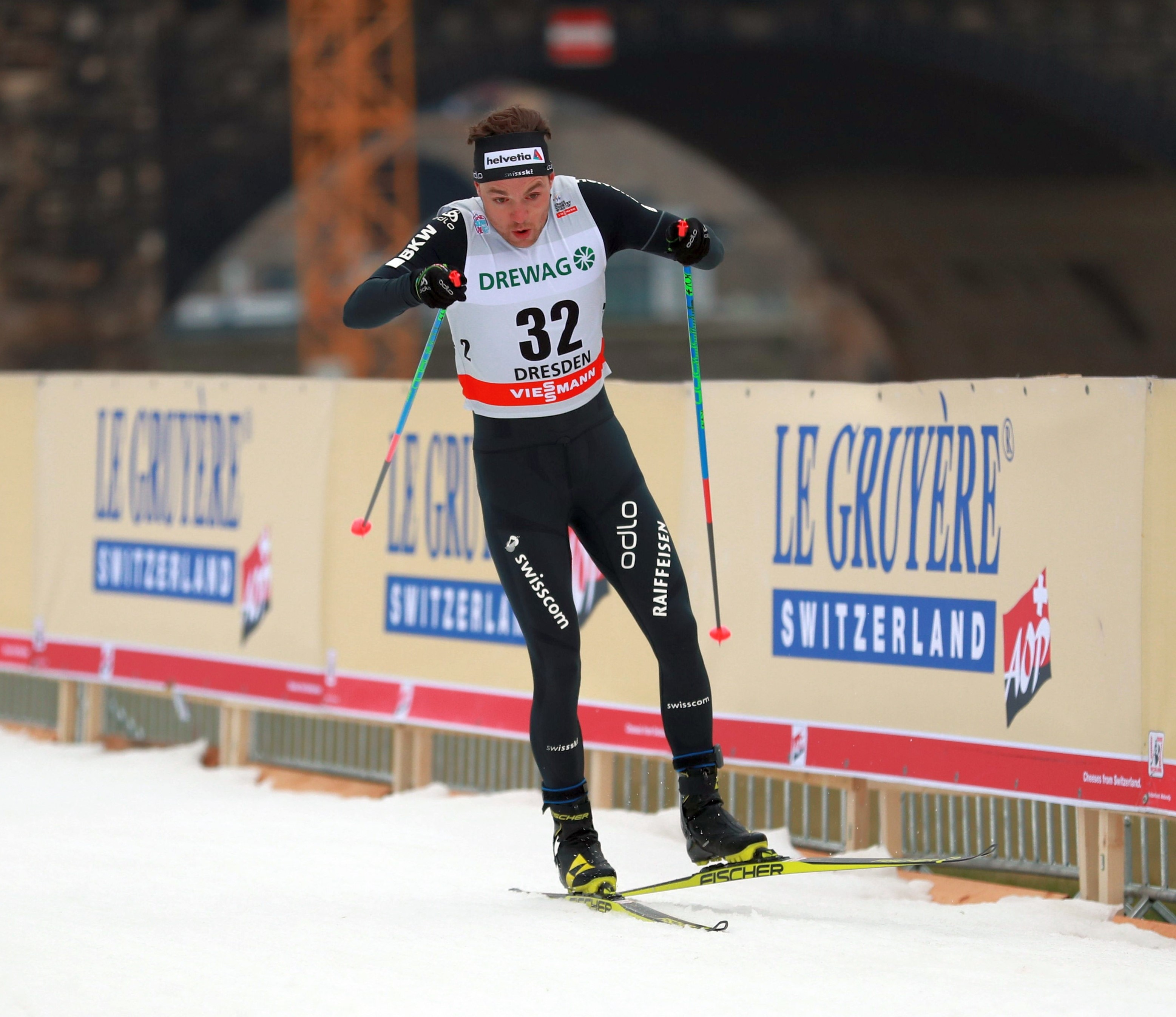
- Käser in 2018

Personal information
- Nationality: Switzerland
- Born: 8 June 1992 (age 34)

Sport
- Sport: Skiing
- Club: SC Gardes Frontière

World Cup career
- Seasons: 11 – (2013–present)
- Indiv. starts: 85
- Indiv. podiums: 0
- Team starts: 10
- Team podiums: 0
- Overall titles: 0 – (78th in 2021)
- Discipline titles: 0
- Updated on 29 March 2023

Erwan Käser (born 8 June 1992) is a Swiss cross-country skier. He competed in the 2018 Winter Olympics.

== Cross-country skiing results ==
All results are sourced from the International Ski Federation (FIS).

=== Olympic Games ===
Year	Age	15 km individual	30 km skiathlon	50 km mass start	Sprint	4 × 10 km relay	Team sprint
2018	25	—	—	—	51	—	—

=== World Championships ===
Year	Age	15 km individual	30 km skiathlon	50 km mass start	Sprint	4 × 10 km relay	Team sprint
2021	28	—	—	—	52	—	—
2023	30	—	—	—	31	—	—

=== World Cup ===
==== Season standings ====
Season	Age	Discipline standings				Ski Tour standings				
Season	Age	Overall	Distance	Sprint	U23	Nordic Opening	Tour de Ski	Ski Tour 2020	World Cup Final	Ski Tour Canada
2013	20	NC	NC	NC	—N/a	—	—	—N/a	—	—N/a
2014	21	NC	NC	NC	—N/a	—	—	—N/a	—	—N/a
2015	22	135	NC	80	21	—	DNF	—N/a	—N/a	—N/a
2016	23	NC	NC	NC	—N/a	—	—	—N/a	—N/a	—
2017	24	117	94	79	—N/a	—	DNF	—N/a	—	—N/a
2018	25	109	NC	56	—N/a	DNF	—	—N/a	—	—N/a
2019	26	NC	NC	NC	—N/a	—	DNF	—N/a	—	—N/a
2020	27	145	NC	86	—N/a	—	DNF	—	—N/a	—N/a
2021	28	78	NC	36	—N/a	—	DNF	—N/a	—N/a	—N/a
2022	29	119	NC	66	—N/a	—N/a	DNF	—N/a	—N/a	—N/a
2023	30	97	NC	48	—N/a	—N/a	DNF	—N/a	—N/a	—N/a
