= Kamil Bury =

Polish cross-country skier (born 1995)

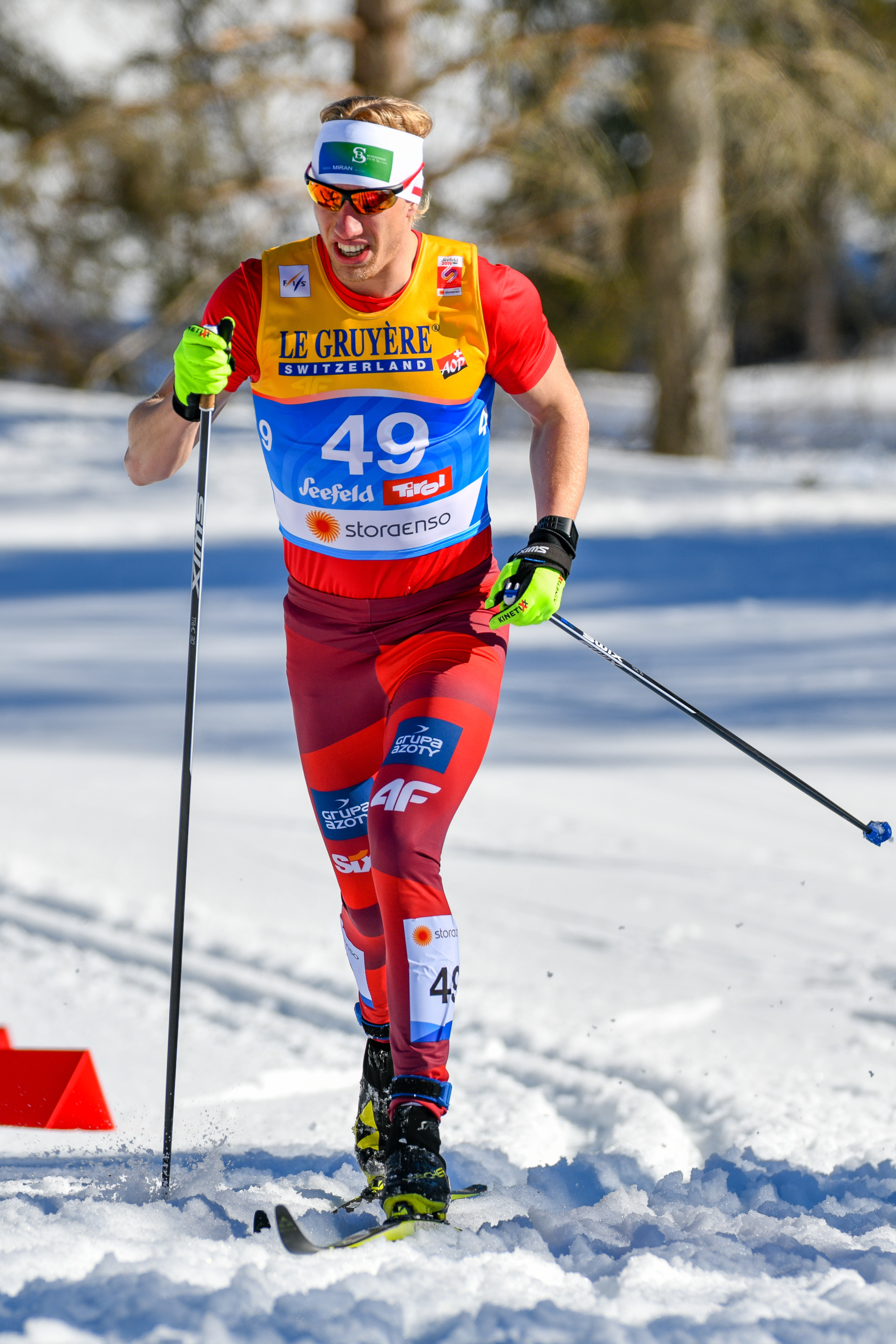
- Bury in 2019

Personal information
- Nationality: Poland
- Born: 23 July 1995 (age 31) Cieszyn, Poland

Sport
- Sport: Skiing
- Club: AZS AWF Katowice

World Cup career
- Seasons: 7 – (2017–present)
- Indiv. starts: 78
- Indiv. podiums: 0
- Team starts: 5
- Team podiums: 0
- Overall titles: 0 – (90th in 2020)
- Discipline titles: 0
- Updated on 29 March 2023

Kamil Bury (born 23 July 1995) is a Polish cross-country skier. He competed in the 2018 Winter Olympics.

His brother Dominik is also a skier.

== Cross-country skiing results ==
All results are sourced from the International Ski Federation (FIS).

=== Olympic Games ===
Year	Age	15 km individual	30 km skiathlon	50 km mass start	Sprint	4 × 10 km relay	Team sprint
2018	22	78	—	—	30	—	—
2022	26	—	—	—^{[a]}	58	—	15

^{a} Distance reduced to 30 km due to weather conditions.

=== World Championships ===
Year	Age	15 km individual	30 km skiathlon	50 km mass start	Sprint	4 × 10 km relay	Team sprint
2019	23	69	66	—	62	—	—
2021	25	—	—	—	46	14	—
2023	27	53	—	—	15	—	—

=== World Cup ===
==== Season standings ====
Season	Age	Discipline standings				Ski Tour standings			
Season	Age	Overall	Distance	Sprint	U23	Nordic Opening	Tour de Ski	Ski Tour 2020	World Cup Final
2017	21	NC	—	NC	NC	—	—	—N/a	—
2018	22	NC	NC	NC	NC	—	—	—N/a	—
2019	23	NC	NC	NC	—N/a	—	DNF	—N/a	—
2020	24	90	NC	62	—N/a	65	42	DNF	—N/a
2021	25	NC	NC	NC	—N/a	DNF	DNF	—N/a	—N/a
2022	26	106	NC	62	—N/a	—N/a	DNF	—N/a	—N/a
2023	27	96	NC	50	—N/a	—N/a	49	—N/a	—N/a
