= Simen Hegstad Krüger =

Norwegian cross-country skier

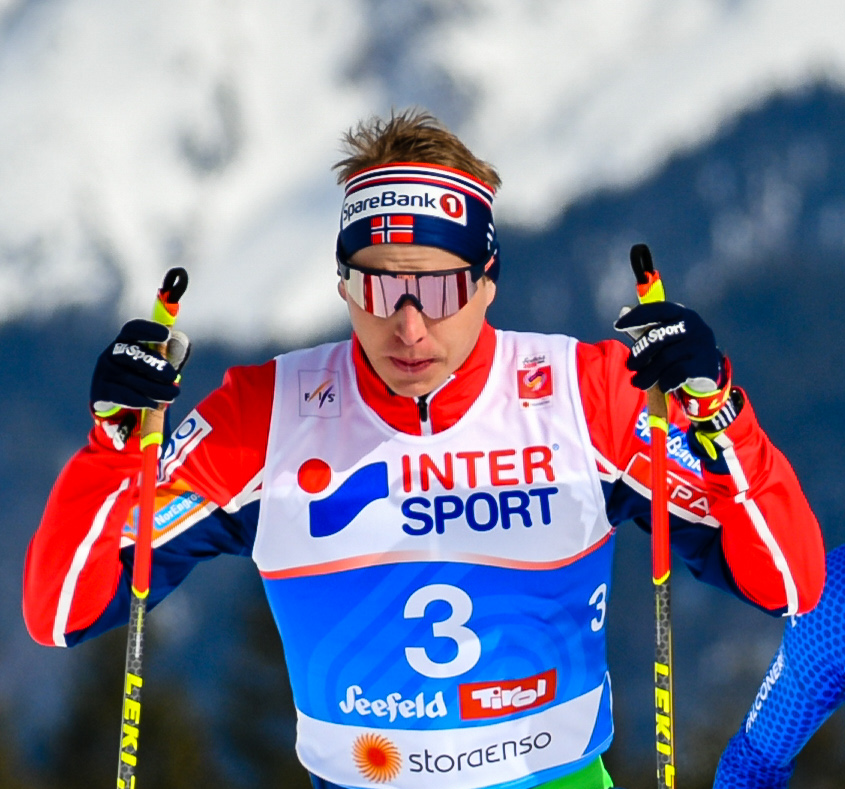
- Krüger in 2019

Personal information
- Nationality: Norway
- Born: 13 March 1993 (age 33) Hønefoss, Buskerud, Norway
- Height: 177 cm (5 ft 10 in)

Sport
- Sport: Skiing
- Club: Lyn

World Cup career
- Seasons: 12 – (2013, 2015–present)
- Indiv. starts: 147
- Indiv. podiums: 32
- Indiv. wins: 11
- Team starts: 15
- Team podiums: 11
- Team wins: 5
- Overall titles: 0 – (4th in 2020, 2023)
- Discipline titles: 1 (DI — 2025)
Medal record
Men's cross-country skiing
Representing Norway
Olympic Games
Gold medal – first place	2018 Pyeongchang	30 km skiathlon
Gold medal – first place	2018 Pyeongchang	4 × 10 km relay
Silver medal – second place	2018 Pyeongchang	15 km freestyle
Bronze medal – third place	2022 Beijing	50 km freestyle
World Championships
Gold medal – first place	2023 Planica	15 km freestyle
Gold medal – first place	2023 Planica	30 km skiathlon
Gold medal – first place	2023 Planica	4 × 10 km relay
Silver medal – second place	2021 Oberstdorf	15 km freestyle
Silver medal – second place	2021 Oberstdorf	30 km skiathlon
Bronze medal – third place	2021 Oberstdorf	50 km classical
Bronze medal – third place	2025 Trondheim	50 km freestyle
Junior World Championships
Silver medal – second place	2013 Liberec	4 × 5 km relay
- Updated on 23 March 2025

Simen Hegstad Krüger (born 13 March 1993) is a Norwegian cross-country skier who competes in the FIS Cross-Country World Cup. He represents the club Lyn. He won the gold medal in the 2018 Olympics Skiathlon event, leading a medal sweep by the Norwegians.

== Cross-country skiing results ==
All results are sourced from the International Ski Federation (FIS).

=== Olympic Games ===
- 4 medals – (2 gold, 1 silver, 1 bronze)

Year	Age	15 km individual	30 km skiathlon	50 km mass start	Sprint	4 × 10 km relay	Team sprint
2018	24	Silver	Gold	—	—	Gold	—
2022	28	—	—	Bronze^{[a]}	—	—	—

^{a} Distance reduced to 30 km due to weather conditions.

=== World Championships ===
- 7 medals – (3 gold, 2 silver, 2 bronze)

Year	Age	10/15 km individual	20/30 km skiathlon	50 km mass start	Sprint	4 × 7.5/10 km relay	Team sprint
2019	25	—	—	5	—	—	—
2021	27	Silver	Silver	Bronze	—	—	—
2023	29	Gold	Gold	—	—	Gold	—
2025	31	46	12	Bronze	—	—	—

=== World Cup ===
==== Season standings ====
Season	Age	Discipline standings				Ski Tour standings				
Season	Age	Overall	Distance	Sprint	U23	Nordic Opening	Tour de Ski	Ski Tour 2020	World Cup Final	Ski Tour Canada
2013	19	NC	NC	—	NC	—	—	—N/a	—	—N/a
2015	21	100	70	—	10	21	—	—N/a	—N/a	—N/a
2016	22	69	39	—	6	—	—	—N/a	—N/a	—
2017	23	17	15	81	—N/a	11	8	—N/a	38	—N/a
2018	24	14	8	NC	—N/a	16	—	—N/a	24	—N/a
2019	25	4	4	47	—N/a	8	3rd place, bronze medalist(s)	—N/a	7	—N/a
2020	26	4	4	29	—N/a	DNF	5	2nd place, silver medalist(s)	—N/a	—N/a
2021	27	16	3rd place, bronze medalist(s)	NC	—N/a	18	—	—N/a	—N/a	—N/a
2022	28	20	8	NC	—N/a	—N/a	DNF	—N/a	—N/a	—N/a
2023	29	4	4	88	—N/a	—N/a	2nd place, silver medalist(s)	—N/a	—N/a	—N/a
2024	30	22	10	109	—N/a	—N/a	—	—N/a	—N/a	—N/a
2025	31	6	1st place, gold medalist(s)	NC	—N/a	—N/a	22	—N/a	—N/a	—N/a

==== Individual podiums ====
- 11 victories – (8 WC, 3 SWC)
- 32 podiums – (23 WC, 9 SWC)

No.	Season	Date	Location	Race	Level	Place
1	2016–17	6 January 2017	Toblach, Italy	10 km Individual F	Stage World Cup	3rd
2	2017–18	16 December 2017	Toblach, Italy	15 km Individual F	World Cup	1st
3	2018–19	30 December 2018	Toblach, Italy	15 km Individual F	Stage World Cup	2nd
4	2018–19	6 January 2019	Val di Fiemme, Italy	9 km Pursuit F	Stage World Cup	2nd
5	2018–19	29 December 2018 – 6 January 2019	(Italy) (Switzerland) (Germany) Tour de Ski	Overall Standings	World Cup	3rd
6	2018–19	26 January 2019	Ulricehamn, Sweden	15 km Individual F	World Cup	2nd
7	2019–20	15 December 2019	Davos, Switzerland	15 km Individual F	World Cup	1st
8	2019–20	5 January 2020	Val di Fiemme, Italy	10 km Mass Start F	Stage World Cup	1st
9	2019–20	19 January 2020	Nové Město, Czech Republic	15 km Pursuit C	World Cup	3rd
10	2019–20	25 January 2020	Oberstdorf, Germany	15 km + 15 km Skiathlon C/F	World Cup	2nd
11	2019–20	15 February 2020	Östersund, Sweden	15 km Individual F	Stage World Cup	2nd
12	2019–20	15–23 February 2020	(Sweden) (Norway) FIS Ski Tour 2020	Overall Standings	World Cup	2nd
13	2019–20	8 March 2020	Oslo, Norway	50 km Mass Start C	World Cup	2nd
14	2020–21	29 January 2021	Falun, Sweden	15 km Individual F	World Cup	2nd
15	2020–21	14 March 2021	Engadin, Switzerland	50 km Pursuit F	World Cup	1st
16	2021–22	4 December 2021	Lillehammer, Norway	15 km Individual F	World Cup	1st
17	2021–22	12 December 2021	Davos, Switzerland	15 km Individual F	World Cup	1st
18	2022–23	18 December 2022	Davos, Switzerland	20 km Individual F	World Cup	1st
19	2022–23	3 January 2023	Oberstdorf, Germany	10 km Individual C	Stage World Cup	2nd
20	2022–23	8 January 2023	Val di Fiemme, Italy	10 km Mass Start F	Stage World Cup	1st
21	2022–23	31 December 2022 – 8 January 2023	(Switzerland) (Germany) (Italy) Tour de Ski	Overall Standings	World Cup	2nd
22	2022–23	4 February 2023	Toblach, Italy	10 km Individual F	World Cup	2nd
23	2022–23	11 March 2023	Oslo, Norway	50 km Mass Start F	World Cup	1st
24	2023–24	10 December 2023	Östersund, Sweden	10 km Individual F	World Cup	2nd
25	2023–24	28 January 2024	Goms, Switzerland	20 km Mass Start F	World Cup	2nd
26	2023–24	9 February 2024	Canmore, Canada	15 km Mass Start F	World Cup	1st
27	2024–25	6 December 2024	Lillehammer, Norway	10 km Individual F	World Cup	2nd
28	2024–25	31 December 2024	Toblach, Italy	20 km Individual F	Stage World Cup	2nd
29	2024–25	5 January 2025	Val di Fiemme, Italy	10 km Mass Start F	Stage World Cup	1st
30	2024–25	19 January 2025	Les Rousses, France	20 km Mass Start C	World Cup	3rd
31	2024–25	15 March 2025	Oslo, Norway	20 km Individual C	World Cup	3rd
32	2024–25	23 March 2025	Lahti, Finland	50 km Mass Start C	World Cup	3rd

==== Team podiums ====
- 5 victories – (5 RL)
- 11 podiums – (11 RL)

No.	Season	Date	Location	Race	Level	Place	Teammates
1	2016–17	22 January 2017	Ulricehamn, Sweden	4 × 7.5 km Relay C/F	World Cup	1st	Sundby / Gløersen / Krogh
2	2018–19	9 December 2018	Beitostølen, Norway	4 × 7.5 km Relay C/F	World Cup	3rd	Tønseth / Holund / Haga
3	2018–19	27 January 2019	Ulricehamn, Sweden	4 × 7.5 km Relay C/F	World Cup	3rd	Holund / Tønseth / Røthe
4	2020–21	24 January 2021	Lahti, Finland	4 × 7.5 km Relay C/F	World Cup	1st	Golberg / Iversen / Røthe
5	2021–22	5 December 2021	Lillehammer, Norway	4 × 7.5 km Relay C/F	World Cup	1st	Valnes / Iversen / Klæbo
6	2022–23	11 December 2022	Beitostølen, Norway	4 × 5 km Mixed Relay C/F	World Cup	1st	L. Udnes Weng / Gunnulfsen / Theodorsen
7	2022–23	5 February 2023	Toblach, Italy	4 × 7.5 km Relay C/F	World Cup	3rd	Røthe / Tønseth / Amundsen
8	2022–23	19 March 2023	Falun, Sweden	4 × 5 km Mixed Relay C/F	World Cup	2nd	Nyenget / Weng / Kalvå
9	2023–24	3 December 2023	Gällivare, Sweden	4 × 7.5 km Relay C/F	World Cup	1st	Golberg / Jenssen / Nyenget
10	2023–24	21 January 2024	Oberhof, Germany	4 × 7.5 km Relay C/F	World Cup	3rd	Taugbøl / Tønseth / Stenshagen
11	2023–24	26 January 2024	Goms, Switzerland	4 × 5 km Mixed Relay C/F	World Cup	3rd	Nyenget / Bergane / T. Udnes Weng
