= Emil Iversen =

Norwegian cross-country skier (born 1991)

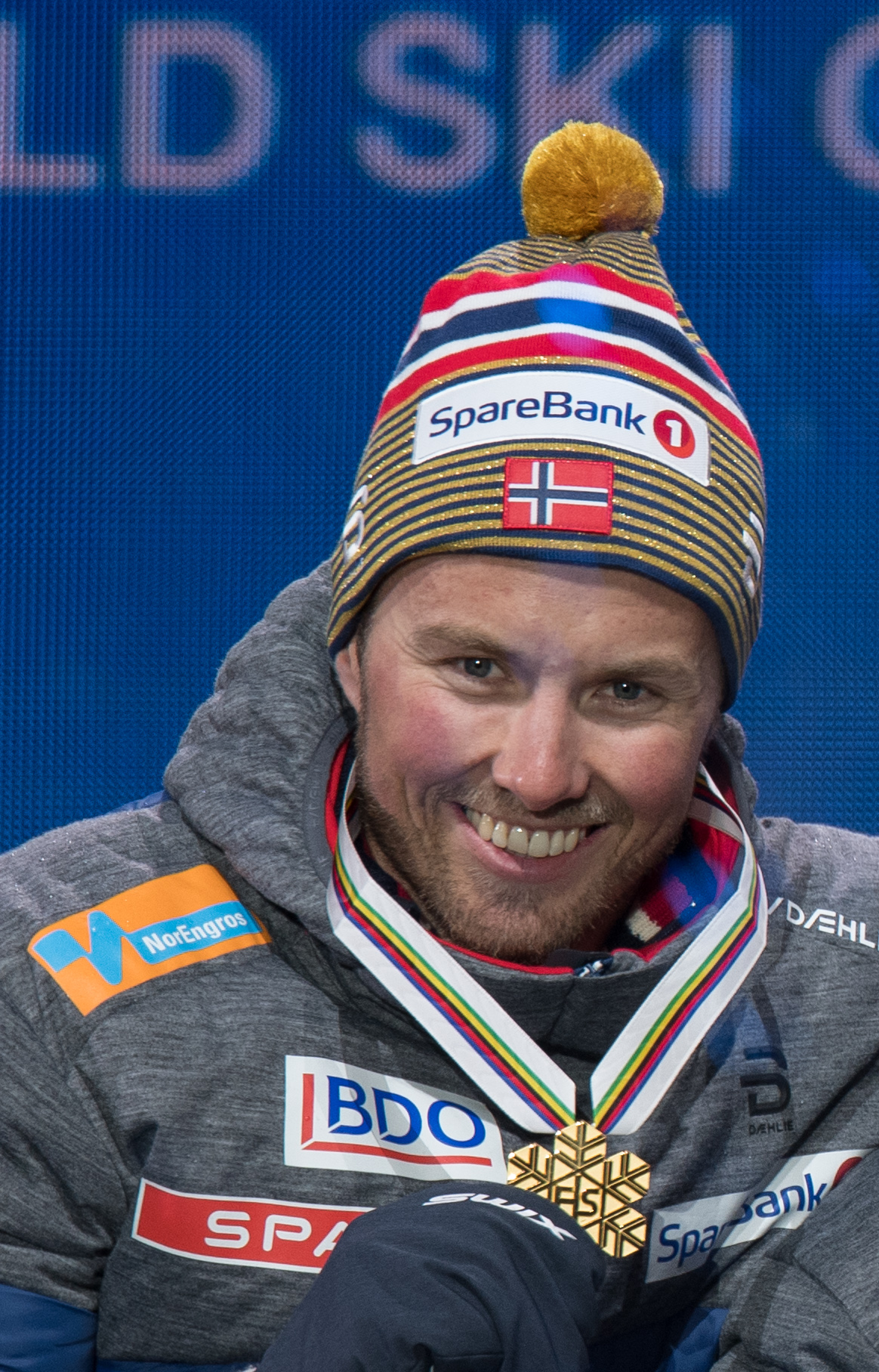
- Iversen in 2019

Personal information
- Nationality: Norway
- Born: 12 August 1991 (age 34) Meråker Municipality, Norway
- Height: 1.86 m (6 ft 1 in)

Sport
- Sport: Skiing
- Club: IL Varden

World Cup career
- Seasons: 13 – (2014–present)
- Indiv. starts: 151
- Indiv. podiums: 30
- Indiv. wins: 8
- Team starts: 7
- Team podiums: 6
- Team wins: 4
- Overall titles: 0 – (6th in 2019)
- Discipline titles: 0
Medal record
Men's cross-country skiing
Representing Norway
Olympic Games
| Gold medal – first place | 2026 Milano Cortina | 4 × 7.5 km relay |
| Silver medal – second place | 2022 Beijing | 4 × 10 km relay |
| Bronze medal – third place | 2026 Milano Cortina | 50 km classical |
World Championships
| Gold medal – first place | 2019 Seefeld | Team sprint |
| Gold medal – first place | 2019 Seefeld | 4 × 10 km relay |
| Gold medal – first place | 2021 Oberstdorf | 50 km classical |
| Gold medal – first place | 2021 Oberstdorf | 4 × 10 km relay |
Junior World Championships
| Gold medal – first place | 2011 Otepää | 4 × 5 km relay |
- Updated on 22 March 2026

Emil Iversen (born 12 August 1991) is a Norwegian cross-country skier who represents IL Varden. He is 2019 World Champion in team sprint and 4 × 10 km relay.

== Athletic career ==
2010/11

Iversen was junior world champion in the relay in 2011 with Sindre Bjørnestad Skar, Mathias Rundgreen and Erik Bergfall Brovold. He debuted in the FIS Cross-Country World Cup in Lillehammer on 7 December 2013.

2015/16

Iversen won his first World Cup stage race on 5 January 2016 in the classic sprint stage of the Tour de Ski in Oberstdorf. He won his second World Cup in the skate sprint in Lahti on 20 February 2016. He won his third World Cup in the 17.5 km classic mass start stage in Montréal on 2 March 2016.

== Cross-country skiing results ==
All results are sourced from the International Ski Federation (FIS).

=== Olympic Games ===
- 3 medals – (1 gold, 1 silver, 1 bronze)

| Year | Age | 10/15 km individual | 20/30 km skiathlon | 50 km mass start | Sprint | 4 × 7.5/10 km relay | Team sprint ; |
|---|---|---|---|---|---|---|---|
| 2018 | 26 | — | — | 10 | 8 | — | — |
| 2022 | 30 | — | — | —^{[a]} | — | Silver | — |
| 2026 | 34 | — | — | Bronze | — | Gold | — |

^{a} Distance reduced to 30 km due to weather conditions.

=== World Championships ===
- 4 medals – (4 gold)

| Year | Age | 15 km individual | 30 km skiathlon | 50 km mass start | Sprint | 4 × 10 km relay | Team sprint |
|---|---|---|---|---|---|---|---|
| 2017 | 25 | — | — | — | 10 | — | 4 |
| 2019 | 27 | 10 | 31 | — | 5 | Gold | Gold |
| 2021 | 29 | — | 5 | Gold | 10 | Gold | — |
| 2023 | 31 | — | — | 13 | — | — | — |

=== World Cup ===
==== Season standings ====
| Season | Age | Discipline standings | | | Ski Tour standings | | | | |
| Season | Age | Overall | Distance | Sprint | Nordic Opening | Tour de Ski | Ski Tour 2020 | World Cup Final | Ski Tour Canada |
|---|---|---|---|---|---|---|---|---|---|
| 2014 | 22 | NC | NC | NC | — | — | —N/a | — | —N/a |
| 2015 | 23 | 60 | 65 | 31 | 27 | — | —N/a | —N/a | —N/a |
| 2016 | 24 | 8 | 15 | 9 | — | 10 | —N/a | —N/a | 7 |
| 2017 | 25 | 11 | 14 | 7 | 4 | DNF | —N/a | 32 | —N/a |
| 2018 | 26 | 9 | 19 | 4 | 15 | 14 | —N/a | 31 | —N/a |
| 2019 | 27 | 6 | 10 | 8 | 3rd place, bronze medalist(s) | DNF | —N/a | 5 | —N/a |
| 2020 | 28 | 9 | 7 | 15 | 2nd place, silver medalist(s) | DNF | 4 | —N/a | —N/a |
| 2021 | 29 | 12 | 15 | 22 | 3rd place, bronze medalist(s) | — | —N/a | —N/a | —N/a |
| 2022 | 30 | 51 | 30 | 88 | —N/a | DNF | —N/a | —N/a | —N/a |
| 2023 | 31 | 31 | 24 | 86 | —N/a | 20 | —N/a | —N/a | —N/a |
| 2024 | 32 | 133 | 100 | 106 | —N/a | — | —N/a | —N/a | —N/a |
| 2025 | 33 | 95 | 58 | — | —N/a | — | —N/a | —N/a | —N/a |
| 2026 | 34 | 10 | 7 | — | —N/a | 5 | —N/a | —N/a | —N/a |

==== Individual podiums ====
- 8 victories – (3 WC, 5 SWC)
- 30 podiums – (15 WC, 15 SWC)

| No. | Season | Date | Location | Race | Level | Place |
|---|---|---|---|---|---|---|
| 1 | 2015–16 | 5 January 2016 | Oberstdorf, Germany | 1.2 km Sprint C | Stage World Cup | 1st |
| 2 | 2015–16 | 20 February 2016 | Lahti, Finland | 1.6 km Sprint F | World Cup | 1st |
| 3 | 2015–16 | 2 March 2016 | Montreal, Canada | 17.5 km Mass Start C | Stage World Cup | 1st |
| 4 | 2015–16 | 5 March 2016 | Quebec City, Canada | 15 km Pursuit F | Stage World Cup | 3rd |
| 5 | 2016–17 | 27 November 2016 | Rukatunturi, Finland | 15 km Individual C | World Cup | 2nd |
| 6 | 2016–17 | 2 December 2016 | Lillehammer, Norway | 1.6 km Sprint C | Stage World Cup | 2nd |
| 7 | 2016–17 | 28 February 2017 | Falun, Sweden | 1.4 km Sprint F | World Cup | 2nd |
| 8 | 2016–17 | 29 February 2017 | Falun, Sweden | 30 km Mass Start C | World Cup | 1st |
| 9 | 2017–18 | 4 January 2018 | Oberstdorf, Germany | 15 km Mass Start F | Stage World Cup | 1st |
| 10 | 2017–18 | 20 January 2018 | Planica, Slovenia | 1.6 km Sprint C | World Cup | 2nd |
| 11 | 2017–18 | 4 March 2018 | Lahti, Finland | 15 km Individual C | World Cup | 3rd |
| 12 | 2018–19 | 25 November 2018 | Rukatunturi, Finland | 15 km Individual C | World Cup | 2nd |
| 13 | 2018–19 | 30 November 2018 | Lillehammer, Norway | 1.6 km Sprint F | Stage World Cup | 2nd |
| 14 | 2018–19 | 30 November – 2 December 2018 | (Norway) Nordic Opening | Overall Standings | World Cup | 3rd |
| 15 | 2018–19 | 2 January 2019 | Oberstdorf, Germany | 15 km Mass Start C | Stage World Cup | 1st |
| 16 | 2018–19 | 16 March 2019 | Falun, Sweden | 1.4 km Sprint F | World Cup | 2nd |
| 17 | 2019–20 | 30 November 2019 | Rukatunturi, Finland | 15 km Individual C | Stage World Cup | 3rd |
| 18 | 2019–20 | 1 December 2019 | Rukatunturi, Finland | 15 km Pursuit F | Stage World Cup | 3rd |
| 19 | 2019–20 | 29 November – 1 December 2019 | (Finland) Nordic Opening | Overall Standings | World Cup | 2nd |
| 20 | 2019–20 | 7 December 2019 | Lillehammer, Norway | 15 km + 15 km Skiathlon C/F | World Cup | 3rd |
| 21 | 2019–20 | 20 February 2020 | Meråker, Norway | 34 km Mass Start F | Stage World Cup | 3rd |
| 22 | 2019–20 | 23 February 2020 | Trondheim, Norway | 30 km Pursuit C | Stage World Cup | 1st |
| 23 | 2019–20 | 8 March 2020 | Oslo, Norway | 50 km Mass Start C | World Cup | 3rd |
| 24 | 2020–21 | 27 November 2020 | Rukatunturi, Finland | 1.4 km Sprint C | Stage World Cup | 3rd |
| 25 | 2020–21 | 27–29 November 2020 | (Finland) Nordic Opening | Overall Standings | World Cup | 3rd |
| 26 | 2020–21 | 23 January 2021 | Lahti, Finland | 15 km + 15 km Skiathlon C/F | World Cup | 1st |
| 27 | 2025–26 | 6 December 2025 | Trondheim, Norway | 10 km + 10 km Skiathlon C/F | World Cup | 3rd |
| 28 | 2025–26 | 29 December 2025 | Toblach, Italy | 10 km Individual C | Stage World Cup | 3rd |
| 29 | 2025–26 | 4 January 2026 | Val di Fiemme, Italy | 10 km Mass Start F | Stage World Cup | 3rd |
| 30 | 2025–26 | 25 January 2026 | Goms, Switzerland | 20 km Mass Start C | World Cup | 2nd |

==== Team podiums ====
- 4 victories – (3 RL, 1 TS)
- 6 podiums – (5 RL, 1 TS)

| No. | Season | Date | Location | Race | Level | Place | Teammate(s) |
|---|---|---|---|---|---|---|---|
| 1 | 2015–16 | 6 December 2015 | Lillehammer, Norway | 4 × 7.5 km Relay C/F | World Cup | 3rd | Tønseth / Røthe / Gløersen |
| 2 | 2018–19 | 9 December 2018 | Beitostølen, Norway | 4 × 7.5 km Relay C/F | World Cup | 1st | Sundby / Røthe / Krogh |
| 3 | 2018–19 | 10 February 2019 | Lahti, Finland | 6 × 1.6 km Team Sprint C | World Cup | 1st | Klæbo |
| 4 | 2020–21 | 24 January 2021 | Lahti, Finland | 4 × 7.5 km Relay C/F | World Cup | 1st | Golberg / Røthe / Krüger |
| 5 | 2021–22 | 5 December 2021 | Lillehammer, Norway | 4 × 7.5 km Relay C/F | World Cup | 1st | Valnes / Krüger / Klæbo |
| 6 | 2022–23 | 11 December 2022 | Beitostølen, Norway | 4 × 5 km Mixed Relay C/F | World Cup | 2nd | Kalvå / Nyenget / Weng |
