= Calle Halfvarsson =

Swedish cross-country skier (born 1989)

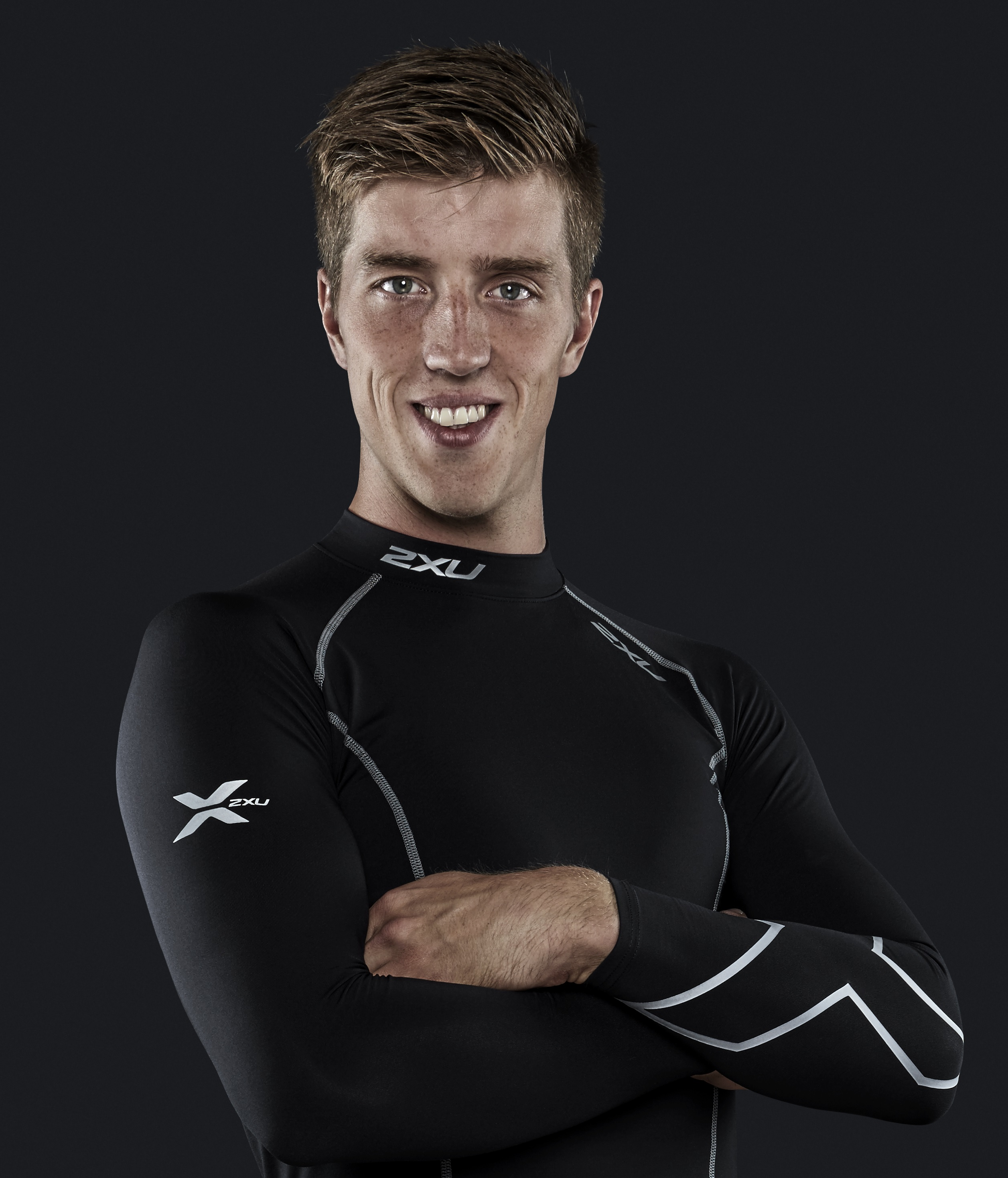
- Calle Halfvarsson in September 2014

Personal information
- Full name: Carl-Christian Halfvarsson
- Nationality: Sweden
- Born: 17 March 1989 (age 37) Sågmyra, Sweden
- Height: 1.84 m (6 ft 0 in)

Sport
- Sport: Skiing
- Club: Sågmyra SK

World Cup career
- Seasons: 15 – (2009, 2011–present)
- Indiv. starts: 223
- Indiv. podiums: 19
- Indiv. wins: 3
- Team starts: 19
- Team podiums: 9
- Team wins: 2
- Overall titles: 0 – (3rd in 2015)
- Discipline titles: 0
Medal record
Men's cross-country skiing
Representing Sweden
World Championships
Silver medal – second place	2013 Val di Fiemme	4 × 10 km relay
Silver medal – second place	2015 Falun	4 × 10 km relay
Bronze medal – third place	2017 Lahti	4 × 10 km relay
Junior World Championships
Gold medal – first place	2008 Mals	Individual sprint
- Updated on 7 January 2024

Carl-Christian "Calle" Halfvarsson (born 17 March 1989) is a Swedish cross-country skier who has been competing in the FIS World Cup since 2009. He was part of Swedish relay team that finished second at the 2013 World Championships in Val di Fiemme, Italy. His best overall Tour de Ski result was third in 2014/2015.

== Cross-country skiing results ==
All results are sourced from the International Ski Federation (FIS).

=== Olympic Games ===
Year	Age	15 km individual	30 km skiathlon	50 km mass start	Sprint	4 × 10 km relay	Team sprint
2014	24	—	—	—	17	—	—
2018	28	9	DNF	DNF	13	5	4
2022	32	26	30	38^{[a]}	—	—	—

^{a} Distance reduced to 30 km due to weather conditions.

=== World Championships ===
- 3 medals – (2 silver, 1 bronze)

Year	Age	15 km individual	30 km skiathlon	50 km mass start	Sprint	4 × 10 km relay	Team sprint
2013	23	7	7	—	7	Silver	—
2015	25	49	6	24	13	Silver	9
2017	27	10	20	—	9	Bronze	—
2019	29	16	—	6	21	5	4
2021	31	—	DNF	—	—	—	—
2023	33	—	6	4	5	6	5

=== World Cup ===
==== Season standings ====
Season	Age	Discipline standings			Ski Tour standings				
Season	Age	Overall	Distance	Sprint	Nordic Opening	Tour de Ski	Ski Tour 2020	World Cup Final	Ski Tour Canada
2009	19	NC	NC	NC	—N/a	NC	—N/a	54	—N/a
2011	21	61	82	29	51	—	—N/a	30	—N/a
2012	22	47	37	51	15	—	—N/a	29	—N/a
2013	23	15	18	20	15	14	—N/a	28	—N/a
2014	24	5	17	11	6	8	—N/a	14	—N/a
2015	25	3rd place, bronze medalist(s)	4	11	6	3rd place, bronze medalist(s)	—N/a	—N/a	—N/a
2016	26	80	82	49	—	—	—N/a	—N/a	—
2017	27	21	22	14	5	—	—N/a	—	—N/a
2018	28	13	23	10	10	DNF	—N/a	7	—N/a
2019	29	15	21	15	4	16	—N/a	—	—N/a
2020	30	19	22	17	9	15	DNF	—N/a	—N/a
2021	31	74	51	91	—	DNF	—N/a	—N/a	—N/a
2022	32	16	17	24	—N/a	10	—N/a	—N/a	—N/a
2023	33	7	16	14	—N/a	6	—N/a	—N/a	—N/a
2024	34	12	19	24	—N/a	22	—N/a	—N/a	—N/a

==== Individual podiums ====
- 3 victories – (3 SWC)
- 19 podiums – (9 WC, 10 SWC)

No.	Season	Date	Location	Race	Level	Place
1	2013–14	29 December 2013	Oberhof, Germany	1.5 km Sprint F	Stage World Cup	1st
2	2013–14	14 March 2014	Falun, Sweden	1.4 km Sprint C	Stage World Cup	3rd
3	2014–15	3 January 2015	Oberstdorf, Germany	4 km Individual F	Stage World Cup	2nd
4	2014–15	4 January 2015	Oberstdorf, Germany	15 km Pursuit C	Stage World Cup	3rd
5	2014–15	8 January 2015	Toblach, Italy	25 km Pursuit F	Stage World Cup	2nd
6	2014–15	3–11 January 2015	(Germany) (Switzerland) (Italy) Tour de Ski	Overall Standings	World Cup	3rd
7	2016–17	26 November 2016	Rukatunturi, Finland	1.4 km Sprint C	World Cup	2nd
8	2016–17	2 December 2016	Lillehammer, Norway	1.6 km Sprint C	Stage World Cup	1st
9	2016–17	3 December 2016	Lillehammer, Norway	10 km Individual F	Stage World Cup	1st
10	2016–17	29 January 2017	Falun, Sweden	30 km Mass Start C	World Cup	3rd
11	2017–18	24 November 2017	Rukatunturi, Finland	1.4 km Sprint C	Stage World Cup	3rd
12	2017–18	21 January 2018	Planica, Slovenia	15 km Individual C	World Cup	3rd
13	2017–18	27 January 2018	Seefeld, Austria	1.4 km Sprint F	World Cup	3rd
14	2017–18	17 March 2018	Falun, Sweden	15 km Mass Start C	Stage World Cup	2nd
15	2018–19	25 November 2018	Rukatunturi, Finland	15 km Individual C	World Cup	3rd
16	2021–22	12 March 2022	Falun, Sweden	15 km Individual F	World Cup	2nd
17	2022–23	9 December 2022	Beitostølen, Norway	1.3 km Sprint C	World Cup	3rd
18	2022–23	6 January 2023	Val di Fiemme, Italy	1.2 km Sprint C	Stage World Cup	2nd
19	2022–23	25 March 2023	(Finland) Lahti, Sweden	1.4 km Sprint C	World Cup	2nd

==== Team podiums ====
- 2 victories – (1 RL, 1 TS)
- 9 podiums – (7 RL, 2 TS)

No.	Season	Date	Location	Race	Level	Place	Teammate(s)
1	2011–12	20 November 2011	Sjusjøen, Norway	4 × 10 km Relay C/F	World Cup	3rd	Hellner / Rickardsson / Olsson
2	2011–12	15 January 2012	Milan, Italy	6 × 1.4 km Team Sprint F	World Cup	2nd	Peterson
3	2012–13	20 January 2013	La Clusaz, France	4 × 7.5 km Relay C/F	World Cup	2nd	Rickardsson / Olsson / Hellner
4	2016–17	21 January 2017	Ulricehamn, Sweden	4 × 7.5 km Relay C/F	World Cup	2nd	Rickardsson / Olsson / Hellner
5	2021-22	13 March 2022	Falun, Sweden	12 × 1 km Mixed Team Sprint F	World Cup	1st	Sundling
6	2022–23	11 December 2022	Beitostølen, Norway	4 × 5 km Mixed Relay C/F	World Cup	3rd	Dahlqvist / Poromaa / Karlsson
7	2022–23	5 February 2023	Toblach, Italy	4 × 7.5 km Relay C/F	World Cup	2nd	Rosjö / Häggström / Anger
8	2022–23	19 March 2023	Falun, Sweden	4 × 5 km Mixed Relay C/F	World Cup	1st	Ilar / Anger / Sundling
9	2023–24	3 December 2023	Gällivare, Sweden	4 × 7.5 km Relay C/F	World Cup	2nd	Häggström / Johansson / Anger
