= Johan Häggström =

Swedish cross-country skier (born 1992)

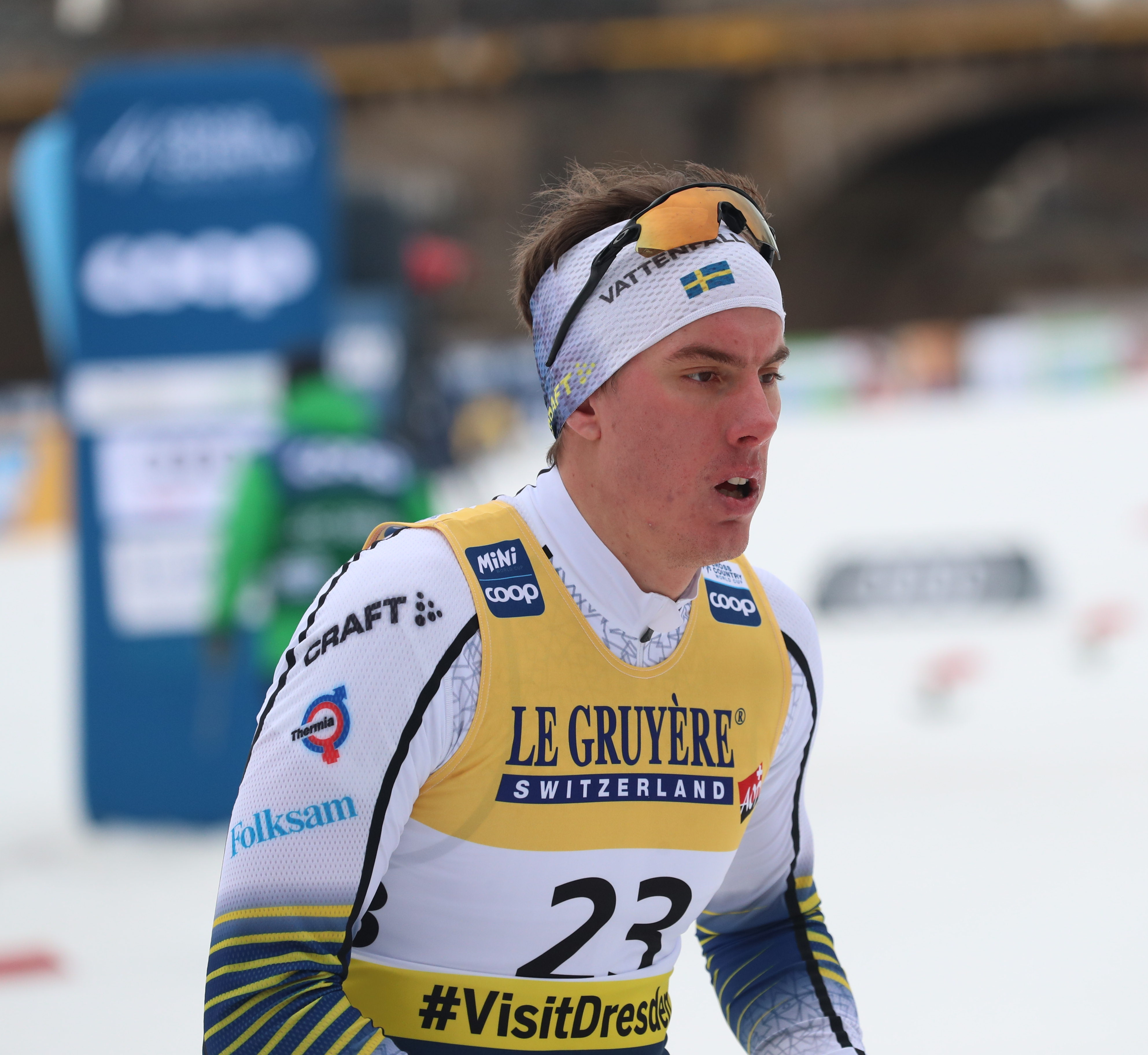
- Häggström in January, 2019

Personal information
- Full name: Carl Johan Häggström
- Nationality: Sweden
- Born: 10 March 1992 (age 34) Lilla Lappträsk, Sweden

Sport
- Sport: Skiing
- Club: Piteå Elit

World Cup career
- Seasons: 8 – (2017–present)
- Indiv. starts: 92
- Indiv. podiums: 1
- Indiv. wins: 0
- Team starts: 11
- Team podiums: 5
- Team wins: 0
- Overall titles: 0 – (16th in 2024)
- Discipline titles: 0
- Updated on 26 January 2024

Carl Johan Häggström (born 10 March 1992) is a Swedish cross-country skier.

== Cross-country skiing results ==
All results are sourced from the International Ski Federation (FIS).

=== Olympic Games ===
Year	Age	15 km individual	30 km skiathlon	50 km mass start	Sprint	4 × 10 km relay	Team sprint
2022	29	21	—	—^{[a]}	13	4	—

^{a} Distance reduced to 30 km due to weather conditions.

=== World Championships ===
Year	Age	15 km individual	30 km skiathlon	50 km mass start	Sprint	4 × 10 km relay	Team sprint
2021	28	—	—	44	19	4	—
2023	30	20	—	—	13	6	—

=== World Cup ===
==== Season standings ====
Season	Age	Discipline standings			Ski Tour standings			
Season	Age	Overall	Distance	Sprint	Nordic Opening	Tour de Ski	Ski Tour 2020	World Cup Final
2017	25	NC	NC	—	—	—	—N/a	—
2018	26	NC	—	NC	—	—	—N/a	—
2019	27	45	80	25	—	—	—N/a	16
2020	28	21	47	9	17	31	26	—N/a
2021	29	57	68	28	26	DNF	—N/a	—N/a
2022	30	50	81	27	—N/a	—	—N/a	—N/a
2023	31	37	70	26	—N/a	43	—N/a	—N/a
2024	32	16	32	13	—N/a	43	—N/a	—N/a

==== Individual podiums ====
- 1 podium – (1 WC)

No.	Season	Date	Location	Race	Level	Place
1	2019–20	11 January 2020	Dresden, Germany	1.3 km Sprint F	World Cup	3rd

==== Team podiums ====
- 5 podiums – (3 RL, 2 TS)

No.	Season	Date	Location	Race	Level	Place	Teammate(s)
1	2019–20	12 January 2020	Dresden, Germany	12 x 0.65 km Team Sprint F	World Cup	2nd	Grate
2	2020–21	7 February 2021	Ulricehamn, Sweden	6 × 1.5 km Team Sprint F	World Cup	3rd	Westberg
3	2022–23	5 February 2023	Toblach, Italy	4 × 7.5 km Relay C/F	World Cup	2nd	Rosjö / Halfvarsson / Anger
4	2023–24	9 December 2023	Gällivare, Sweden	4 × 7.5 km Relay C/F	World Cup	2nd	Halfvarsson / Johansson / Anger
5	2023–24	26 January 2024	Goms, Switzerland	4 × 5 km Mixed Relay C/F	World Cup	2nd	Andersson / Anger / Dahlqvist
