= Pål Golberg =

Norwegian cross-country skier

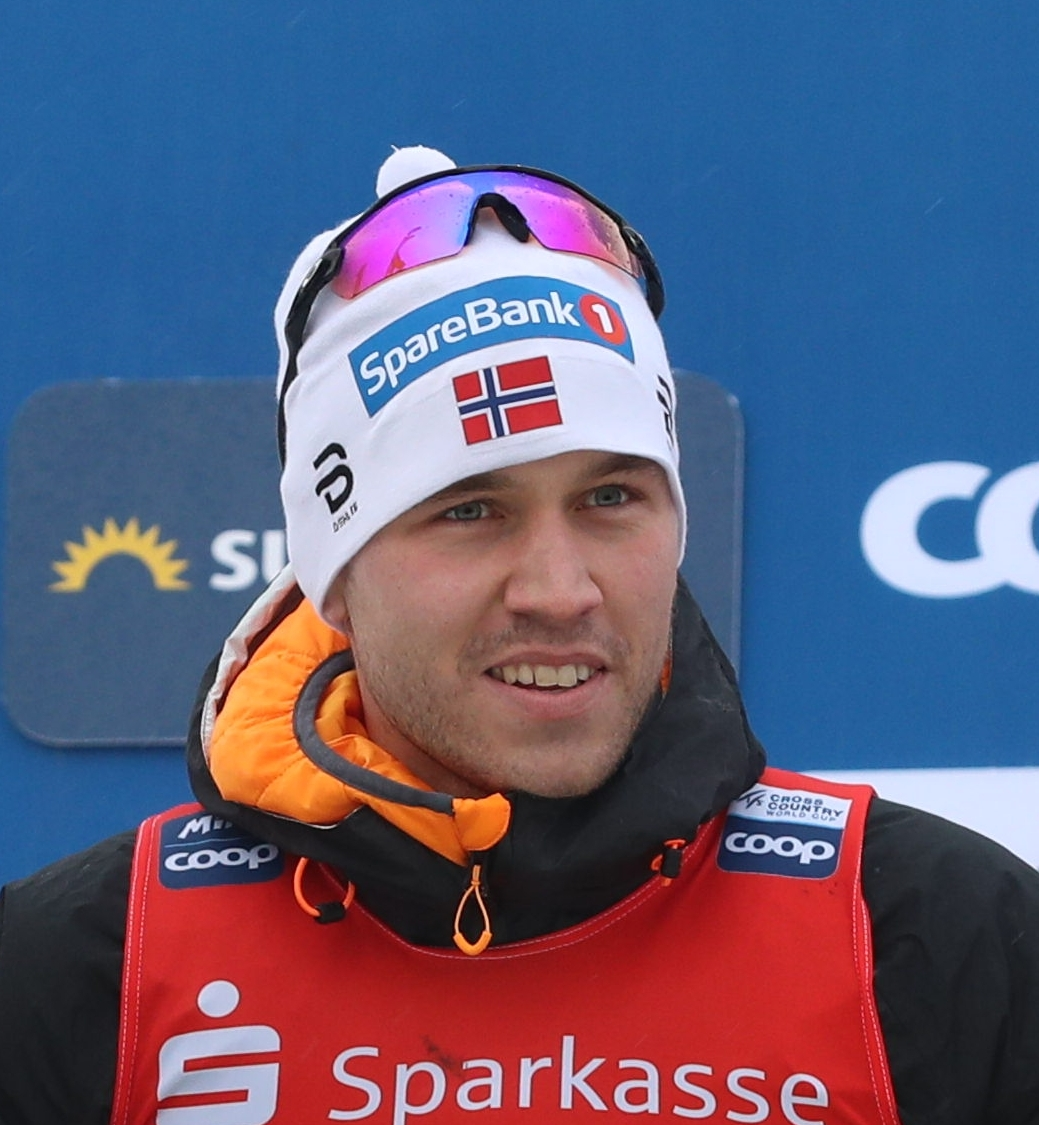
- Golberg in 2019

Personal information
- Nationality: Norway
- Born: 16 July 1990 (age 36) Gol, Norway
- Height: 1.85 m (6 ft 1 in)

Sport
- Sport: Skiing
- Club: Gol Il

World Cup career
- Seasons: 16 – (2010–present)
- Indiv. starts: 208
- Indiv. podiums: 42
- Indiv. wins: 13
- Team starts: 20
- Team podiums: 14
- Team wins: 6
- Overall titles: 0 – (3rd in 2020)
- Discipline titles: 1 – (DI in 2023)
Medal record
Men's cross-country skiing
Representing Norway
Olympic Games
Silver medal – second place	2022 Beijing	4 × 10 km relay
World Championships
Gold medal – first place	2021 Oberstdorf	4 × 10 km relay
Gold medal – first place	2023 Planica	50 km classical
Gold medal – first place	2023 Planica	Team sprint
Gold medal – first place	2023 Planica	4 × 10 km relay
Silver medal – second place	2023 Planica	Individual sprint
Junior World Championships
Gold medal – first place	2010 Hinterzarten	10 km classical
Gold medal – first place	2010 Hinterzarten	4 × 5 km relay
Silver medal – second place	2010 Hinterzarten	Individual sprint
- Updated on 23 March 2025

Pål Golberg (born 16 July 1990) is a Norwegian cross-country skier. His biggest World Cup success so far is the victory in FIS Ski Tour 2020, stage event placed in Sweden and Norway. He represents the club Gol IL.

== Cross-country skiing results ==
All results are sourced from the International Ski Federation (FIS).

=== Olympic Games ===
- 1 medal – (1 silver)

Year	Age	15 km individual	30 km skiathlon	50 km mass start	Sprint	4 × 10 km relay	Team sprint
2014	23	18	—	—	—	—	—
2018	27	—	—	—	4	—	—
2022	31	15	5	—^{[a]}	21	Silver	—

^{a} Distance reduced to 30 km due to weather conditions.

=== World Championships ===
- 5 medals – (4 gold, 1 silver)

Year	Age	10/15 km individual	20/30 km skiathlon	50 km mass start	Sprint	4 × 7.5/10 km relay	Team sprint
2013	22	—	—	—	5	—	11
2021	30	—	—	8	8	Gold	—
2023	32	—	4	Gold	Silver	Gold	Gold
2025	34	—	—	27	—	—	—

=== World Cup ===
==== Season standings ====
Season	Age	Discipline standings			Ski Tour standings				
Season	Age	Overall	Distance	Sprint	Nordic Opening	Tour de Ski	Ski Tour 2020	World Cup Final	Ski Tour Canada
2010	19	NC	—	NC	—N/a	—	—N/a	—	—N/a
2011	20	63	NC	24	—	—	—N/a	—	—N/a
2012	21	37	88	9	—	—	—N/a	30	—N/a
2013	22	21	39	15	11	—	—N/a	9	—N/a
2014	23	9	11	9	22	—	—N/a	15	—N/a
2015	24	18	45	10	4	—	—N/a	—N/a	—N/a
2016	25	75	NC	36	42	—	—N/a	—N/a	—
2017	26	20	35	6	7	—	—N/a	12	—N/a
2018	27	34	72	13	18	—	—N/a	—	—N/a
2019	28	43	66	21	—	—	—N/a	30	—N/a
2020	29	3rd place, bronze medalist(s)	10	3rd place, bronze medalist(s)	4	6	1st place, gold medalist(s)	—N/a	—N/a
2021	30	19	11	42	23	—	—N/a	—N/a	—N/a
2022	31	9	18	13	—N/a	5	—N/a	—N/a	—N/a
2023	32	2nd place, silver medalist(s)	1st place, gold medalist(s)	7	—N/a	5	—N/a	—N/a	—N/a
2024	33	4	3rd place, bronze medalist(s)	22	—N/a	11	—N/a	—N/a	—N/a
2025	34	17	8	—	—N/a	—	—N/a	—N/a	—N/a

==== Individual podiums ====
- 13 victories – (11 WC, 2 SWC)
- 42 podiums – (31 WC, 11 SWC)

No.	Season	Date	Location	Race	Level	Place
1	2010–11	3 March 2011	Lahti, Finland	1.4 km Sprint C	World Cup	3rd
2	2011–12	3 December 2011	Düsseldorf, Germany	1.7 km Sprint F	World Cup	3rd
3	2011–12	7 March 2012	Drammen, Norway	1.2 km Sprint C	World Cup	3rd
4	2012–13	12 January 2013	Liberec, Czech Republic	1.6 km Sprint C	World Cup	3rd
5	2012–13	22 March 2013	Falun, Sweden	3.75 km Individual F	Stage World Cup	2nd
6	2013–14	7 December 2013	Lillehammer, Norway	15 km Individual C	World Cup	1st
7	2013–14	1 March 2014	Lahti, Finland	1.55 km Sprint F	World Cup	1st
8	2013–14	5 March 2014	Drammen, Norway	1.3 km Sprint C	World Cup	2nd
9	2014–15	5 December 2014	Lillehammer, Norway	1.5 km Sprint F	Stage World Cup	1st
10	2016–17	26 November 2016	Rukatunturi, Finland	1.4 km Sprint C	World Cup	1st
11	2016–17	4 December 2016	Lillehammer, Norway	15 km Pursuit C	Stage World Cup	3rd
12	2017–18	24 November 2017	Rukatunturi, Finland	1.4 km Sprint C	Stage World Cup	2nd
13	2018–19	19 January 2019	Otepää, Estonia	1.6 km Sprint C	World Cup	3rd
14	2019–20	29 November 2019	Rukatunturi, Finland	1.4 km Sprint C	Stage World Cup	2nd
15	2019–20	26 January 2020	Oberstdorf, Germany	1.6 km Sprint C	World Cup	2nd
16	2019–20	8 February 2020	Falun, Sweden	1.4 km Sprint C	World Cup	1st
17	2019–20	16 February 2020	Östersund, Sweden	15 km Pursuit C	Stage World Cup	1st
18	2019–20	22 February 2020	Trondheim, Norway	1.5 km Sprint C	Stage World Cup	2nd
19	2019–20	15–23 February 2020	(Sweden) (Norway) FIS Ski Tour 2020	Overall Standings	World Cup	1st
20	2020–21	23 January 2021	Lahti, Finland	15 km + 15 km Skiathlon C/F	World Cup	3rd
21	2020–21	30 January 2021	Falun, Sweden	15 km Mass Start C	World Cup	3rd
22	2020–21	13 March 2021	Engadin, Switzerland	15 km Mass Start C	World Cup	3rd
23	2021–22	29 December 2021	Lenzerheide, Switzerland	15 km Individual C	Stage World Cup	3rd
24	2021–22	1 January 2022	Oberstdorf, Germany	1.5 km Sprint C	Stage World Cup	3rd
25	2022–23	25 November 2022	Rukatunturi, Finland	1.4 km Sprint C	World Cup	3rd
26	2022–23	26 November 2022	Rukatunturi, Finland	10 km Individual C	World Cup	2nd
27	2022–23	27 November 2022	Rukatunturi, Finland	20 km Pursuit F	World Cup	2nd
28	2022–23	4 December 2022	Lillehammer, Norway	20 km Mass Start C	World Cup	1st
29	2022–23	10 December 2022	Beitostølen, Norway	10 km Individual C	World Cup	1st
30	2022–23	1 January 2023	Val Müstair, Switzerland	10 km Pursuit C	Stage World Cup	2nd
31	2022–23	7 January 2023	Val di Fiemme, Italy	15 km Mass Start C	Stage World Cup	2nd
32	2022–23	28 January 2023	Les Rousses, France	1.3 km Sprint C	World Cup	3rd
33	2022–23	4 February 2023	Toblach, Italy	10 km Individual F	World Cup	1st
34	2022–23	26 March 2023	Lahti, Finland	20 km Mass Start C	World Cup	2nd
35	2023–24	2 December 2023	Gällivare, Sweden	10 km Individual F	World Cup	1st
36	2023–24	17 December 2023	Trondheim, Norway	10 km Individual C	World Cup	2nd
37	2023–24	20 January 2024	Oberhof, Germany	20 km Mass Start C	World Cup	3rd
38	2023–24	11 February 2024	Canmore, Canada	20 km Mass Start C	World Cup	1st
39	2023–24	18 February 2024	(United States) Minneapolis, USA - Stifel Loppet Cup	10 km Individual F	World Cup	3rd
40	2023–24	10 March 2024	Oslo, Norway	50 km Mass Start C	World Cup	3rd
41	2024–25	17 January 2025	Les Rousses, France	10 km Individual F	World Cup	2nd
42	2024–25	16 February 2025	Falun, Sweden	20 km Mass Start F	World Cup	1st

==== Team podiums ====
- 6 victories – (4 RL, 2 TS)
- 14 podiums – (7 RL, 6 TS, 1 MR)

No.	Season	Date	Location	Race	Level	Place	Teammate(s)
1	2011–12	4 December 2011	Düsseldorf, Germany	6 × 1.7 km Team Sprint F	World Cup	3rd	Hattestad
2	2012–13	13 January 2013	Liberec, Czech Republic	6 × 1.6 km Team Sprint F	World Cup	2nd	Brandsdal
3	2013–14	8 December 2013	Lillehammer, Norway	4 × 7.5 km Relay C/F	World Cup	3rd	Tønseth / Sundby / Northug
4	2013–14	12 January 2014	Nové Město, Czech Republic	6 × 1.6 km Team Sprint C	World Cup	3rd	Hattestad
5	2018–19	13 January 2019	Dresden, Germany	6 × 1.6 km Team Sprint F	World Cup	2nd	Brandsdal
6	2019–20	8 December 2019	Lillehammer, Norway	4 × 7.5 km Relay C/F	World Cup	3rd	Holund / Røthe / Krogh
7	2019–20	1 March 2020	Lahti, Finland	4 × 7.5 km Relay C/F	World Cup	1st	Holund / Røthe / Klæbo
8	2020–21	24 January 2021	Lahti, Finland	4 × 7.5 km Relay C/F	World Cup	1st	Iversen / Røthe / Krüger
9	2021–22	5 December 2021	Lillehammer, Norway	4 × 7.5 km Relay C/F	World Cup	3rd	Nyenget / Holund / Amundsen
10	2023–24	3 December 2023	Gällivare, Sweden	4 × 7.5 km Relay C/F	World Cup	1st	Nyenget / Krüger / Jenssen
11	2023–24	21 January 2024	Oberhof, Germany	4 × 7.5 km Relay C/F	World Cup	1st	Nyenget / Valnes / Klæbo
12	2023–24	1 March 2024	Lahti, Finland	6 × 1.3 km Team Sprint C	World Cup	1st	Klæbo
13	2024–25	13 December 2024	Davos, Switzerland	6 × 1.5 km Team Sprint F	World Cup	1st	Klæbo
14	2024–25	24 January 2025	Engadin, Switzerland	4 × 5 km Mixed Relay C/F	World Cup	2nd	Sanness / Andersen / Fosnæs
