= Juho Mikkonen =

Finnish cross-country skier

Personal information
- Nationality: Finland
- Born: 28 December 1990 (age 35) Kuhmo, Finland

Sport
- Sport: Skiing
- Club: Vuokatti Ski Team Kainuu

World Cup career
- Seasons: 13 – (2009–2021)
- Indiv. starts: 65
- Indiv. podiums: 0
- Team starts: 7
- Team podiums: 0
- Overall titles: 0 – (68th in 2021)
- Discipline titles: 0
Medal record
Men's cross-country skiing
Representing Finland
U23 World Championships
| Silver medal – second place | 2013 Liberec | Individual sprint |
- Updated on 5 January 2022

Juho Mikkonen (born 28 December 1990 in Kuhmo) is a Finnish cross-country skier.

Mikkonen competed at the 2014 Winter Olympics for Finland. He placed 43rd in the qualifying round in the sprint, failing to advance to the knockout stages. He also competed at the 2021 FIS Nordic World Ski Championships in three events.

Mikkonen made his World Cup debut in March 2009. His best result in a World Cup race is 4th, in a freestyle sprint at Lillehammer in December 2014. His best World Cup overall finish is 78th, in the 2014–15 season. His best World Cup finish in a discipline is 36th, in the 2014-15 sprint.

== Cross-country skiing results ==
All results are sourced from the International Ski Federation (FIS).

=== Olympic Games ===
| Year | Age | 15 km individual | 30 km skiathlon | 50 km mass start | Sprint | 4 × 10 km relay | Team sprint |
|---|---|---|---|---|---|---|---|
| 2014 | 23 | — | — | — | 43 | — | — |

=== World Championships ===
| Year | Age | 15 km individual | 30 km skiathlon | 50 km mass start | Sprint | 4 × 10 km relay | Team sprint |
|---|---|---|---|---|---|---|---|
| 2021 | 30 | — | 43 | 43 | 57 | — | — |

=== World Cup ===
==== Season standings ====
| Season | Age | Discipline standings | | | Ski Tour standings | | | | |
| Season | Age | Overall | Distance | Sprint | Nordic Opening | Tour de Ski | Ski Tour 2020 | World Cup Final | Ski Tour Canada |
|---|---|---|---|---|---|---|---|---|---|
| 2009 | 18 | NC | — | NC | —N/a | — | —N/a | — | —N/a |
| 2010 | 19 | NC | — | NC | —N/a | — | —N/a | — | —N/a |
| 2011 | 20 | NC | — | NC | — | — | —N/a | — | —N/a |
| 2012 | 21 | NC | — | NC | — | — | —N/a | — | —N/a |
| 2013 | 22 | NC | — | NC | — | — | —N/a | — | —N/a |
| 2014 | 23 | 114 | NC | 60 | DNF | — | —N/a | — | —N/a |
| 2015 | 24 | 78 | NC | 36 | 52 | — | —N/a | —N/a | —N/a |
| 2016 | 25 | 101 | NC | 57 | DNF | — | —N/a | —N/a | — |
| 2017 | 26 | NC | NC | NC | — | — | —N/a | — | —N/a |
| 2018 | 27 | 127 | NC | 69 | DNF | — | —N/a | — | —N/a |
| 2019 | 28 | NC | — | NC | — | — | —N/a | — | —N/a |
| 2020 | 29 | 113 | 88 | 73 | 39 | — | — | —N/a | —N/a |
| 2021 | 30 | 68 | 61 | 47 | 46 | 39 | —N/a | —N/a | —N/a |
