= Andrew Musgrave =

British cross-country skier (born 1990)

Andy Musgrave
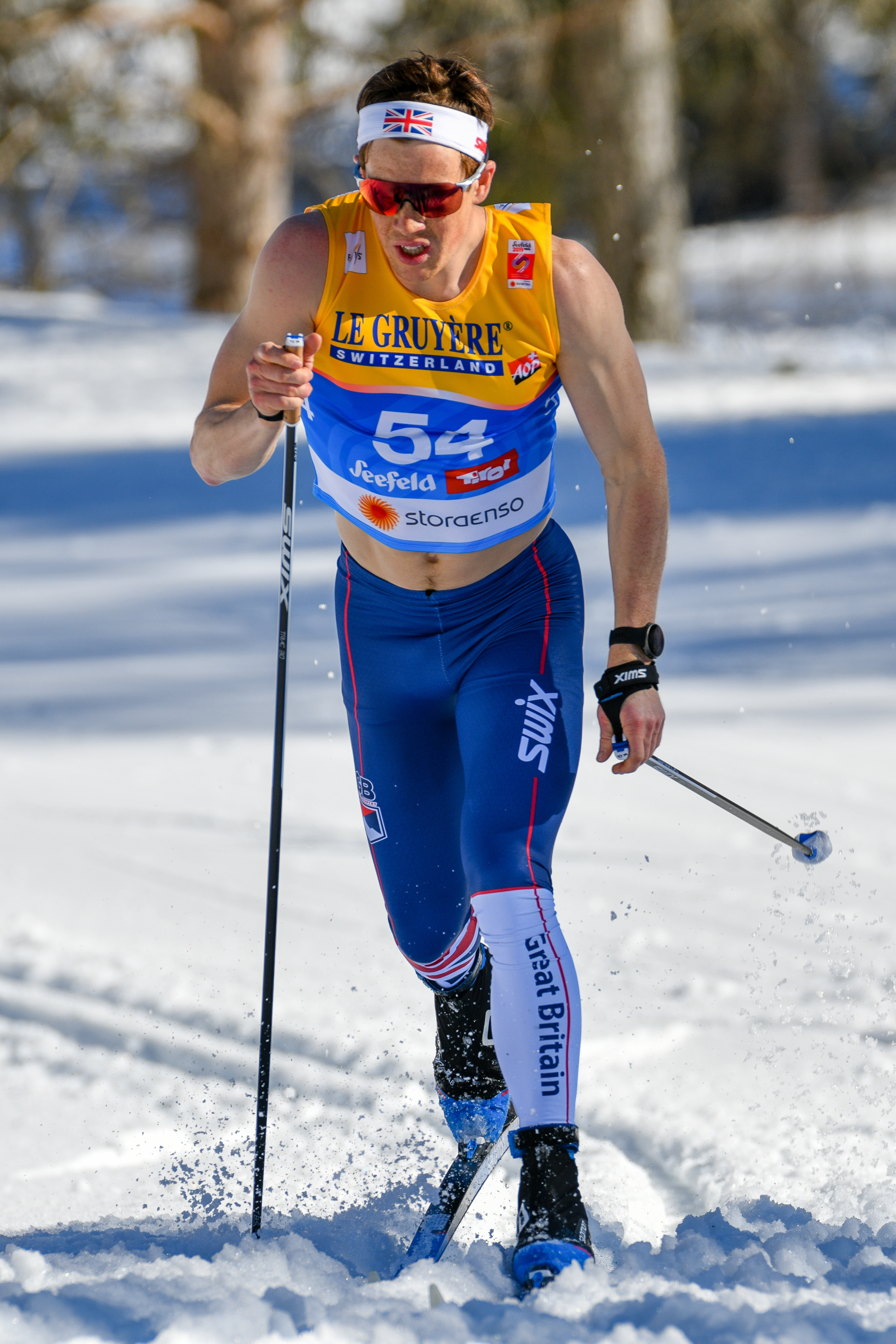
- Andrew Musgrave at the 2019 FIS Nordic World Ski Championships in Seefeld

Personal information
- Nationality: United Kingdom
- Born: 6 March 1990 (age 36) Poole, England

Sport
- Sport: Skiing
- Club: Huntly Nordic SC / Røa IL

World Cup career
- Seasons: 16 – (2009–present)
- Indiv. starts: 248
- Indiv. podiums: 4
- Indiv. wins: 0
- Team starts: 1
- Team podiums: 0
- Overall titles: 0 – (12th in 2023)
- Discipline titles: 0
- Updated on 7 January 2024

Andrew "Andy" Musgrave (born 6 March 1990) is a British cross-country skier. He has competed in the World Cup since 2008 and represented Great Britain at the 2009, 2011, 2013, 2015, 2017, 2019, 2021, 2023, and 2025 Nordic World Ski Championships and the 2010, 2014, 2018, 2022, and 2026 Winter Olympics.

== Personal life and education ==
Musgrave was born in Dorset, England, to parents Frank and Hilary. Frank worked in the oil industry, and his family lived all over the world due to his employment: they left Dorset when Andrew was one year of age, and he has subsequently lived in Shetland, Alaska, Aberdeenshire and Norway. He originally started competing as an alpine skier after his family moved to Alaska when he was five years old; however, he subsequently switched to snowboarding and cross-country skiing. After moving to Aberdeenshire at the age of 11, he started to focus on cross-country skiing on a serious basis alongside friends Andrew Young and Callum Smith.

He is the younger brother of former cross-country skier Posy Musgrave. He also has another older sister, Heather, and an older brother, Ben. He is a member of Oslo-based sports club Røa IL.

== Career ==
At the 2010 Games in Vancouver, Musgrave finished 51st in the 15 km + 15 km double pursuit, 55th in the 15 km freestyle race, and 58th in the individual sprint event. Musgrave's finishes at the 2009 world championships were 14th in the 4 x 10 km relay, 17th in the team sprint, 45th in the 15 km + 15 km double pursuit, 56th in the 15 km, and 65th in the sprint event.

His best World Cup finish in the 2010–11 season was 31st in a sprint event in Drammen in February 2011. He was only 5/100 behind the 30th place in the qualification race. At the Junior World Championships in Otepää in 2011, he finished 6th in the 15 km freestyle event; two years later, in Liberec, he came fourth in the same event, only 14.1 seconds behind the bronze medal winner.

At the 2011 World Championships of Oslo, the Freestyle sprint event, Musgrave qualified in 26th place for the heats. In the Men's 50 Kilometre Freestyle, on his 21st birthday, Musgrave finished 59th, with a time of 2:23:54.

Musgrave scored his first World Cup points in the 3.75 km prologue race of the 2011–12 Tour de Ski on 29 December 2011 in Oberhof, where he finished 28th. To date, his best World Cup result is 11th place in the freestyle sprint stage of the 2012–13 Tour de Ski in Val Müstair. He equalled this result on the 25 km freestyle pursuit stage of the 2015 Tour de Ski in Toblach, setting the fastest time of the day.

In the Norwegian championships freestyle sprint on 17 January 2014, Musgrave won. Two years earlier he came in second on the 15 km freestyle in the Norwegian championships on 26 January 2012. Musgrave did not receive any medals due to his British citizenship. However, Musgrave did take a gold medal at the 2013 Norwegian championships, where he won the team sprint alongside club teammate Martin Johnsrud Sundby (teams at the Norwegian championships may include one foreign competitor).

At the 2014 Winter Olympics, Musgrave qualified in 27th place in the individual sprint, the best-ever performance by a British cross-country skier, but failed to progress from his quarter-final. He then finished 44th in the 15km classical and 53rd in the 50km freestyle. After the Games, Musgrave backed up his victory in the freestyle sprint at the Norwegian championships earlier in the season to win the overall national title.

At the 2017 World Championships in Lahti, Finland, Musgrave scored the best-ever result for a British Nordic skier when he finished fourth in the Men's 50 kilometre freestyle, following an 11th place in the 30 kilometre skiathlon and a 12th in the 15 kilometre classic earlier in the championships. On 16 December 2017, in a 15 kilometre World Cup competition in Toblach, Italy, Musgrave finished in third place.

At the 2018 Winter Olympics, he produced the best-ever finish by a British athlete in Olympic cross-country skiing by finishing seventh in the skiathlon.

Musgrave surpassed this record when he finished sixth in the 10 kilometre freestyle at the 2026 Winter Olympics in Italy. Teaming up with James Clugnet, he then went one better and placed fifth in the team sprint.

== Cross-country skiing results ==
All results are sourced from the International Ski Federation (FIS).

=== Olympic Games ===
Year	Age	10 km individual	15 km individual	30 km skiathlon	50 km mass start	Sprint	4 × 10 km relay	Team sprint
2010	19	-	55	51	—	58	—	DNF
2014	23	-	44	—	53	29	—	DNF
2018	27	-	28	7	37	—	—	12
2022	31	-	46	17	12^{[a]}	—	—	—
2026	35	6	-	-	-	-	-	

^{a} Distance reduced to 30 km due to weather conditions.

=== World Championships ===
Year	Age	15/10 km individual	30/20 km skiathlon	50 km mass start	Sprint	4 × 10/7.5 km relay	Team sprint
2009	18	56	45	—	65	14	17
2011	20	50	58	59	28	15	22
2013	22	28	38	41	—	—	—
2015	24	16	12	34	—	—	—
2017	26	12	11	4	—	—	—
2019	28	8	7	8	—	—	—
2021	30	10	7	7	—	—	—
2023	32	9	14	34	—	—	—
2025	34	16	7	6	—	9	—

=== World Cup ===
==== Season standings ====
Season	Age	Discipline standings			Ski Tour standings				
Season	Age	Overall	Distance	Sprint	Nordic Opening	Tour de Ski	Ski Tour 2020	World Cup Final	Ski Tour Canada
2008-09	18-19	NC	NC	NC	—N/a	—	—N/a	70	—N/a
2009-10	19-20	NC	NC	NC	—N/a	—	—N/a	—	—N/a
2010-11	20-21	NC	NC	NC	—	—	—N/a	—	—N/a
2011-12	21-22	147	95	98	—	52	—N/a	—	—N/a
2012-13	22-23	82	93	50	—	52	—N/a	—	—N/a
2013-14	23-24	65	52	76	—	26	—N/a	—	—N/a
2014-15	24-25	44	38	65	50	19	—N/a	—N/a	—N/a
2015-16	25-26	43	31	67	16	40	—N/a	—N/a	36
2016-17	26-27	23	18	43	29	18	—N/a	9	—N/a
2017-18	27-28	22	14	69	28	15	—N/a	29	—N/a
2018-19	28-29	21	18	73	15	17	—N/a	17	—N/a
2019-20	29-30	70	49	NC	31	32	45	—N/a	—N/a
2020-21	30-31	20	16	60	6	DNF	—N/a	—N/a	—N/a
2021-22	31-32	30	15	NC	—N/a	29	—N/a	—N/a	—N/a
2022-23	32-33	12	8	81	—N/a	19	—N/a	—N/a	—N/a
2023-24	33-34	19	8	90	—N/a	DNF	—N/a	—N/a	—N/a
2024-25	34-35	22	18	NC	—N/a	12	—N/a	—N/a	—N/a

==== Individual podiums ====
- 5 podiums – (3 WC, 2 SWC)

No.	Season	Date	Location	Race	Level	Place
1	2016–17	19 March 2017	Quebec City, Canada	15 km Pursuit F	Stage World Cup	2nd
2	2017–18	16 December 2017	Toblach, Italy	15 km Individual F	World Cup	3rd
3	2022–23	10 December 2022	Beitostølen, Norway	10 km Individual C	World Cup	3rd
4	2023–24	16 December 2023	Trondheim, Norway	10 km + 10 km Skiathlon C/F	World Cup	2nd
5	2024–25	31 December 2024	Toblach, Italy	20 km Individual F	Stage World Cup	3rd
