= Marko Kilp =

Estonian cross-country skier (born 1993)

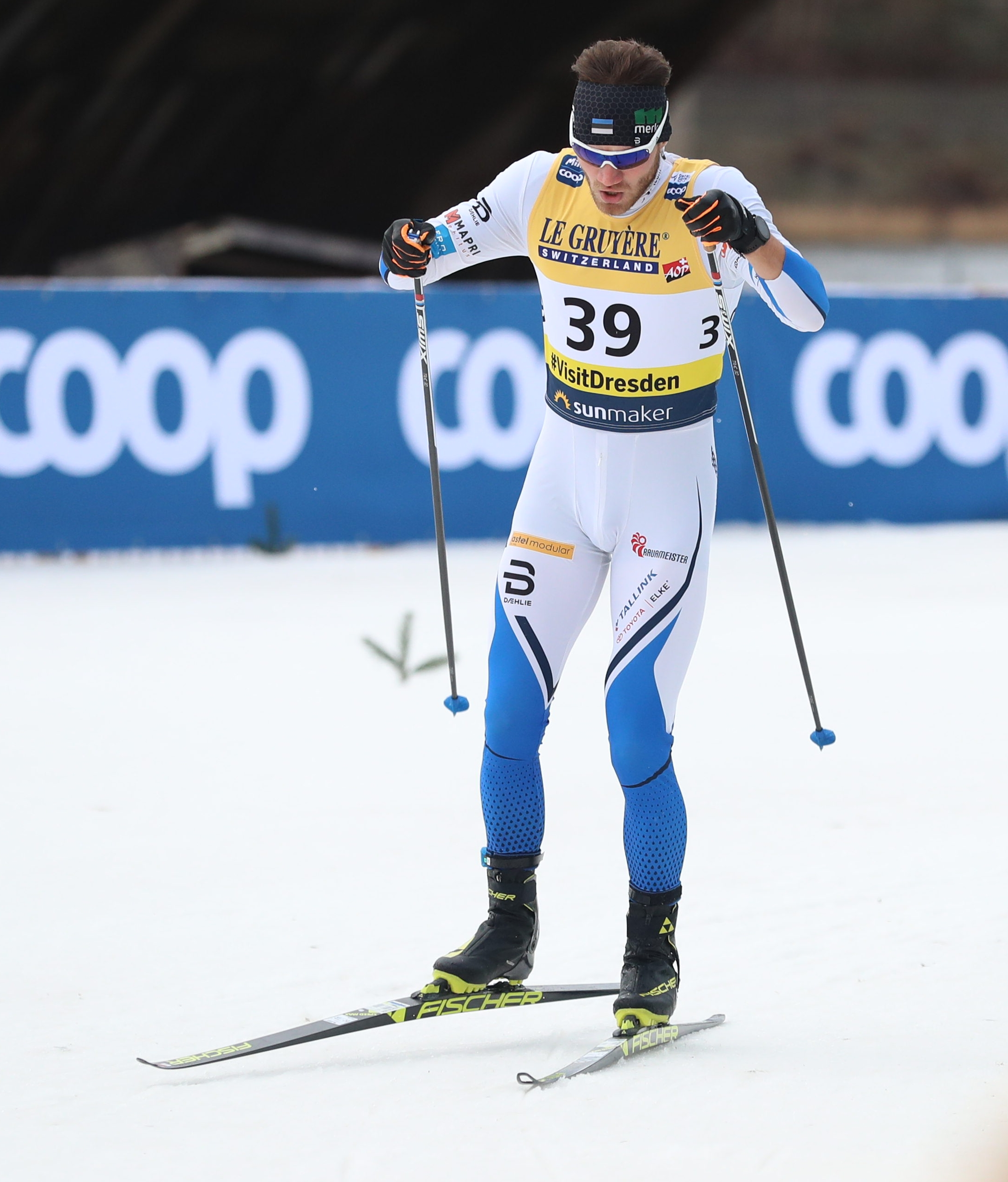
- Kilp in 2019

Personal information
- Nationality: Estonia
- Born: 1 November 1993 (age 32) Tallinn, Estonia

Sport
- Sport: Skiing
- Club: Voru Skiclub

World Cup career
- Seasons: 10 – (2013, 2015–present)
- Indiv. starts: 73
- Indiv. podiums: 0
- Team starts: 12
- Team podiums: 0
- Overall titles: 0 – (94th in 2017)
- Discipline titles: 0
- Updated on 29 March 2023

Marko Kilp (born 1 November 1993) is an Estonian cross-country skier. He competed in the 2018 Winter Olympics and in the 2022 Winter Olympics.

== Cross-country skiing results ==
All results are sourced from the International Ski Federation (FIS).

=== Olympic Games ===
| Year | Age | 15 km individual | 30 km skiathlon | 50 km mass start | Sprint | 4 × 10 km relay | Team sprint |
|---|---|---|---|---|---|---|---|
| 2018 | 24 | — | — | — | 18 | — | 17 |
| 2022 | 28 | — | — | — | 45 | 15 | — |

=== World Championships ===
| Year | Age | 15 km individual | 30 km skiathlon | 50 km mass start | Sprint | 4 × 10 km relay | Team sprint |
|---|---|---|---|---|---|---|---|
| 2015 | 21 | — | — | — | 36 | — | — |
| 2017 | 23 | — | — | — | 50 | — | 14 |
| 2019 | 25 | — | — | — | 52 | — | 12 |
| 2021 | 27 | — | — | DNF | 20 | 13 | 15 |
| 2023 | 29 | — | — | — | 25 | 12 | 12 |

=== World Cup ===
==== Season standings ====
| Season | Age | Discipline standings | | | | Ski Tour standings | | | | |
| Season | Age | Overall | Distance | Sprint | U23 | Nordic Opening | Tour de Ski | Ski Tour 2020 | World Cup Final | Ski Tour Canada |
|---|---|---|---|---|---|---|---|---|---|---|
| 2013 | 19 | NC | — | NC | —N/a | — | — | —N/a | — | —N/a |
| 2015 | 21 | NC | — | NC | NC | — | — | —N/a | —N/a | —N/a |
| 2016 | 22 | NC | NC | NC | NC | DNF | DNF | —N/a | —N/a | — |
| 2017 | 23 | 94 | NC | 45 | —N/a | DNF | DNF | —N/a | — | —N/a |
| 2018 | 24 | 105 | NC | 52 | —N/a | DNF | — | —N/a | — | —N/a |
| 2019 | 25 | 125 | NC | 74 | —N/a | DNF | DNF | —N/a | — | —N/a |
| 2020 | 26 | 117 | NC | 70 | —N/a | DNF | — | — | —N/a | —N/a |
| 2021 | 27 | 103 | 84 | 77 | —N/a | DNF | DNF | —N/a | —N/a | —N/a |
| 2022 | 28 | NC | NC | NC | —N/a | —N/a | DNF | —N/a | —N/a | —N/a |
| 2023 | 29 | 123 | NC | 65 | —N/a | —N/a | DNF | —N/a | —N/a | —N/a |
