= Ville Ahonen =

Finnish cross-country skier (born 1994)

Ville Ahonen (born 14 October 1994) is a Finnish cross-country skier.

== Career ==
At the Junior World Championships he competed in 2013 and 2016 (U23) with modest results. He made his World Cup debut in March 2015 in Lahti. A breakthrough was his 16th place in the Oberstdorf sprint during the 2021–22 Tour de Ski. During the late 2021–22 FIS Cross-Country World Cup season, he collected World Cup points with 22nd places in Lahti and Holmenkollen, and began the 2022–23 season with a 15th place in the Beitostølen sprint. He equalled that placement in March 2023 in Lahti, and improved further to a 14th place in the Lahti 20 kilometres in March 2024.

Ahonen finished 10th in the sprint at the 2023 World Championships. He did not finish the 50 kilometres race.

He represents the club Imatran Urheilijat, as does his younger brother Olli Ahonen.
