= FIS Nordic World Ski Championships 2021 – Men's 50 kilometre classical =

Men's 50 kilometre classical at the FIS Nordic World Ski Championships 2021
- Location: Oberstdorf, Germany
- Date: 7 March
- Competitors: 57 from 22 nations
- Winning time: 2:10:52.9

Medalists
gold medal	Emil Iversen	Norway
silver medal	Alexander Bolshunov
bronze medal	Simen Hegstad Krüger	Norway

The Men's 50 kilometre classical competition at the FIS Nordic World Ski Championships 2021 was held on 7 March 2021.

== Results ==
The race was started at 13:00.

Rank	Bib	Athlete	Country	Time	Deficit
1st place, gold medalist(s)	3	Emil Iversen	Norway	2:10:52.9	
2nd place, silver medalist(s)	1	Alexander Bolshunov	Russian Ski Federation	2:10:53.6	+0.7
3rd place, bronze medalist(s)	9	Simen Hegstad Krüger	Norway	2:11:01.1	+8.2
4	10	Hans Christer Holund	Norway	2:11:01.5	+8.6
5	19	Jens Burman	Sweden	2:11:18.5	+25.6
6	14	Iivo Niskanen	Finland	2:11:24.3	+31.4
7	8	Andrew Musgrave	Great Britain	2:11:36.4	+43.5
8	11	Pål Golberg	Norway	2:11:51.6	+58.7
9	5	Dario Cologna	Switzerland	2:11:52.0	+59.1
10	33	Scott Patterson	United States	2:12:17.6	+1:24.7
11	27	Jason Rüesch	Switzerland	2:12:31.1	+1:38.2
12	18	William Poromaa	Sweden	2:12:40.1	+1:47.2
13	13	Clément Parisse	France	2:12:46.0	+1:53.1
14	6	Aleksey Chervotkin	Russian Ski Federation	2:12:55.2	+2:02.3
15	7	Ilia Semikov	Russian Ski Federation	2:13:19.7	+2:26.8
16	45	David Norris	United States	2:13:20.8	+2:27.9
17	17	Jonas Dobler	Germany	2:13:39.3	+2:46.4
18	32	Imanol Rojo	Spain	2:13:44.9	+2:52.0
19	2	Evgeniy Belov	Russian Ski Federation	2:13:49.2	+2:56.3
20	28	Friedrich Moch	Germany	2:13:49.7	+2:56.8
21	35	Candide Pralong	Switzerland	2:14:04.9	+3:12.0
22	23	Jonas Baumann	Switzerland	2:14:47.4	+3:54.5
23	47	Keishin Yoshida	Japan	2:14:52.7	+3:59.8
24	21	Michal Novák	Czech Republic	2:15:02.3	+4:09.4
25	30	Thomas Hjalmar Westgård	Ireland	2:15:13.6	+4:20.7
26	4	Maurice Manificat	France	2:15:27.8	+4:34.9
27	37	Antoine Cyr	Canada	2:15:31.2	+4:38.3
28	43	Russell Kennedy	Canada	2:15:45.6	+4:52.7
29	16	Gus Schumacher	United States	2:15:51.3	+4:58.4
30	26	Björn Sandström	Sweden	2:16:03.1	+5:10.2
31	49	Rémi Drolet	Canada	2:17:05.7	+6:12.8
32	20	Perttu Hyvärinen	Finland	2:17:24.0	+6:31.1
33	15	Lucas Bögl	Germany	2:17:50.1	+6:57.2
34	22	Irineu Esteve Altimiras	Andorra	2:18:02.2	+7:09.3
35	57	Kaarel Kasper Kõrge	Estonia	2:18:09.5	+7:16.6
36	38	Lauri Lepistö	Finland	2:18:52.3	+7:59.4
37	36	Hunter Wonders	United States	2:19:21.2	+8:28.3
38	34	Dominik Bury	Poland	2:19:44.5	+8:51.6
39	29	Janosch Brugger	Germany	2:19:54.4	+9:01.5
40	24	Jean-Marc Gaillard	France	2:19:56.1	+9:03.2
41	39	Petr Knop	Czech Republic	2:20:33.5	+9:40.6
42	52	Takatsugu Uda	Japan	2:20:53.9	+10:01.0
43	46	Juho Mikkonen	Finland	2:21:25.8	+10:32.9
44	25	Johan Häggström	Sweden	2:25:08.8	+14:15.9
45	48	Nail Bashmakov	Kazakhstan	2:25:24.9	+14:32.0
46	51	Mateusz Haratyk	Poland	2:25:58.4	+15:05.5
47	59	Phillip Bellingham	Australia	2:27:18.6	+16:25.7
48	40	Adam Fellner	Czech Republic	2:27:45.7	+16:52.8
49	56	Indulis Bikše	Latvia	Lapped	
50	55	Kacper Antolec	Poland	Lapped	
51	58	Franco Dal Farra	Argentina	Lapped	
52	50	Kim Eun-ho	South Korea	Lapped	
53	53	Kim Min-woo	South Korea	Lapped	
	31	Vitaliy Pukhkalo	Kazakhstan	Did not finish	
	44	Philippe Boucher	Canada	Did not finish	
	54	Marko Kilp	Estonia	Did not finish	
	12	Johannes Høsflot Klæbo	Norway	Disqualified	
	41	Yevgeniy Velichko	Kazakhstan	Did not start	
	42	Jonáš Bešťák	Czech Republic	Did not start	
