= FIS Nordic World Ski Championships 2023 – Men's sprint =

Men's sprint at the FIS Nordic World Ski Championships 2023
- Venue: Planica Nordic Centre
- Location: Planica, Slovenia
- Dates: 23 February
- Competitors: 134 from 55 nations
- Winning time: 2:56.07

Medalists
gold medal	Johannes Høsflot Klæbo	Norway
silver medal	Pål Golberg	Norway
bronze medal	Jules Chappaz	France

The men's sprint competition at the FIS Nordic World Ski Championships 2023 was held on 23 February 2023.

== Results ==
=== Qualification ===
The qualification was started at 13:27.

Rank	Bib	Athlete	Country	Time	Deficit	Notes
1	23	Erik Valnes	Norway	2:55.50		Q
2	11	Johannes Høsflot Klæbo	Norway	2:56.51	+1.01	Q
3	5	Pål Golberg	Norway	2:59.15	+3.65	Q
4	25	Michal Novák	Czech Republic	2:59.28	+3.78	Q
5	22	Calle Halfvarsson	Sweden	2:59.54	+4.04	Q
6	19	Ben Ogden	United States	3:01.30	+5.80	Q
7	1	Jules Chappaz	France	3:02.42	+6.92	Q
8	9	Lucas Chanavat	France	3:02.45	+6.95	Q
9	30	Niilo Moilanen	Finland	3:02.57	+7.07	Q
10	21	Håvard Solås Taugbøl	Norway	3:02.81	+7.31	Q
11	28	Ondřej Černý	Czech Republic	3:02.99	+7.49	Q
12	16	Simone Mocellini	Italy	3:03.17	+7.67	Q
13	27	Johan Häggström	Sweden	3:03.26	+7.76	Q
14	3	Even Northug	Norway	3:03.76	+8.26	Q
15	12	JC Schoonmaker	United States	3:03.95	+8.45	Q
16	13	Federico Pellegrino	Italy	3:04.21	+8.71	Q
17	37	Francesco De Fabiani	Italy	3:04.50	+9.00	Q
18	7	Edvin Anger	Sweden	3:04.64	+9.14	Q
19	15	Richard Jouve	France	3:04.74	+9.24	Q
20	17	Renaud Jay	France	3:04.95	+9.45	Q
21	39	Miha Šimenc	Slovenia	3:05.42	+9.92	Q
22	29	Joni Mäki	Finland	3:05.70	+10.20	Q
23	18	Luděk Šeller	Czech Republic	3:06.31	+10.81	Q
24	10	Marcus Grate	Sweden	3:06.34	+10.84	Q
25	34	Ville Ahonen	Finland	3:06.42	+10.92	Q
26	41	Lukas Mrkonjic	Austria	3:06.42	+10.92	Q
27	33	Kamil Bury	Poland	3:06.70	+11.20	Q
28	8	Graham Ritchie	Canada	3:07.21	+11.71	Q
29	42	Janosch Brugger	Germany	3:07.75	+12.25	Q
30	35	Marko Kilp	Estonia	3:07.84	+12.34	Q
31	38	Erwan Käser	Switzerland	3:07.96	+12.46	
32	20	Lauri Vuorinen	Finland	3:08.10	+12.60	
33	31	Michael Föttinger	Austria	3:08.30	+12.80	
34	6	Benjamin Moser	Austria	3:08.45	+12.95	
35	43	Davide Graz	Italy	3:09.43	+13.93	
35	47	Xavier McKeever	Canada	3:09.43	+13.93	
37	48	Vili Črv	Slovenia	3:10.38	+14.88	
38	36	Antoine Cyr	Canada	3:10.45	+14.95	
39	2	Roman Schaad	Switzerland	3:10.78	+15.28	
40	51	Lars Young Vik	Australia	3:11.13	+15.63	
41	44	Martin Himma	Estonia	3:11.30	+15.80	
42	40	Svyatoslav Matassov	Kazakhstan	3:11.47	+15.97	
43	26	Janik Riebli	Switzerland	3:11.79	+16.29	
44	32	Kevin Bolger	United States	3:12.03	+16.53	
45	49	Konstantin Bortsov	Kazakhstan	3:12.17	+16.67	
46	14	Andrew Young	United Kingdom	3:12.32	+16.82	
47	50	Thomas Maloney Westgård	Ireland	3:13.28	+17.78	
48	24	James Clugnet	United Kingdom	3:13.66	+18.16	
49	4	Maciej Staręga	Poland	3:14.42	+18.92	
51	45	Karl Sebastian Dremljuga	Estonia	3:15.43	+19.59	
52	54	Anže Gros	Slovenia	3:15.47	+19.93	
53	53	Takanori Ebina	Japan	3:16.10	+19.97	
54	61	Raul Mihai Popa	Romania	3:16.41	+20.60	
55	62	Sebastian Bryja	Poland	3:16.77	+20.91	
56	55	Julian Smith	Canada	3:17.46	+21.27	
57	60	Dmytro Drahun	Ukraine	3:18.03	+21.96	
58	68	Jáchym Cenek	Slovakia	3:18.75	+22.53	
59	46	Raimo Vīgants	Latvia	3:19.05	+23.25	
60	79	Phillip Bellingham	Australia	3:19.16	+23.66	
61	67	Fedor Karpov	Kazakhstan	3:20.00	+24.50	
62	70	Samuel Ikpefan	Nigeria	3:20.57	+25.07	
63	57	Boštjan Korošec	Slovenia	3:20.89	+25.39	
64	63	Seve De Campo	Australia	3:21.84	+26.34	
65	74	Franco Dal Farra	Argentina	3:22.13	+26.63	
66	58	Olzhas Klimin	Kazakhstan	3:22.38	+26.88	
67	59	Simeon Deyanov	Bulgaria	3:23.22	+27.72	
68	65	Robin Frommelt	Liechtenstein	3:23.23	+27.73	
69	56	Lauris Kaparkalējs	Latvia	3:23.50	+28.00	
70	69	Marko Skender	Croatia	3:23.91	+28.41	
71	76	Andrej Renda	Slovakia	3:24.58	+29.08	
72	72	Fredrik Fodstad	Colombia	3:24.59	+29.09	
73	73	Modestas Vaičiulis	Lithuania	3:25.85	+30.35	
74	80	Ádám Kónya	Hungary	3:27.17	+31.67	
75	66	Dagur Benediktsson	Iceland	3:27.55	+32.05	
76	77	Oleksandr Lisohor	Ukraine	3:28.13	+32.63	
77	75	Strahinja Erić	Bosnia and Herzegovina	3:29.06	+33.56	
78	71	Manex Silva	Brazil	3:29.38	+33.88	
79	95	Batmönkhiin Achbadrakh	Mongolia	3:29.62	+34.12	
80	130	Hamit Tarık Aydin	Turkey	3:30.03	+34.53	
81	101	Yusuf Emre Fırat	Turkey	3:32.54	+37.04	
82	81	Sebastian Endrestad	Chile	3:33.17	+37.67	
83	86	Bruno Krampe	Latvia	3:33.40	+37.90	
84	82	Tautvydas Strolia	Lithuania	3:33.92	+38.42	
85	91	Stevenson Savart	Haiti	3:33.93	+38.43	
86	102	Ruslan Denysenko	Ukraine	3:34.19	+38.69	
87	109	Spartak Voskanyan	Armenia	3:35.52	+40.02	
88	78	Mark Chanloung	Thailand	3:35.73	+40.23	
89	85	Daniel Peshkov	Bulgaria	3:36.33	+40.83	
90	90	Mathis Poutot	Belgium	3:36.52	+41.02	
91	100	Mateo Lorenzo Sauma	Argentina	3:38.14	+42.64	
92	129	Ahmed Oglago	Turkey	3:38.68	+43.18	
93	64	Niks Saulītis	Lithuania	3:38.81	+43.31	
94	84	Gonzalo Ángel Gómez	Argentina	3:38.83	+43.33	
95	94	Aleksandar Grbović	Montenegro	3:39.52	+44.02	
96	114	Yusuf Talay	Turkey	3:40.56	+45.06	
97	89	Todor Malchov	Bulgaria	3:41.80	+46.30	
98	97	Petar Perušić	Croatia	3:41.98	+46.48	
99	92	Kristóf Lágler	Hungary	3:42.06	+46.56	
100	108	Nahuel Torres	Argentina	3:42.51	+47.01	
101	83	Victor Santos	Brazil	3:42.64	+47.14	
102	106	Miloš Milosavljević	Serbia	3:44.20	+48.70	
103	117	Danial Saveh-Shemshaki	Iran	3:49.68	+54.18	
104	111	Samuel Maes	Belgium	3:54.63	+59.13	
105	98	Ernest Tretjakov	Lithuania	3:54.96	+59.46	
106	107	Timo Juhani Grönlund	Bolivia	3:56.31	+1:00.81	
107	105	Miloš Stević	Bosnia and Herzegovina	3:57.58	+1:02.08	
108	88	Stavre Jada	North Macedonia	3:58.56	+1:03.06	
109	110	Theo Mallett	Haiti	4:00.22	+1:04.72	
110	103	Matas Gražys	Lithuania	4:01.59	+1:06.09	
111	118	Darko Damjanovski	North Macedonia	4:03.63	+1:08.13	
112	93	Yonathan Jesús Fernández	Chile	4:04.52	+1:09.02	
113	112	Athanasios Gastis	Greece	4:08.58	+1:13.08	
114	135	Rodrigo Ideus	Colombia	4:10.25	+1:14.75	
115	132	Ahmad Reza Seid	Iran	4:17.52	+1:22.02	
116	87	Paul Keyrouz	Lebanon	4:18.22	+1:22.72	
117	131	José Cabeça	Portugal	4:22.13	+1:26.63	
118	121	Juan Luis Uberuaga	Chile	4:23.98	+1:28.48	
119	126	Juan Carlos Ayala	Mexico	4:26.14	+1:30.64	
120	134	Jaime Luis Huerta	Peru	4:28.59	+1:33.09	
121	124	Carlos Andrés Quintana	Colombia	4:28.70	+1:33.20	
122	115	Musa Rakhmanberdi Uulu	Kyrgyzstan	4:40.38	+1:44.88	
123	122	Đorđe Paunović	Serbia	4:40.51	+1:45.01	
124	116	Eldar Kadyrov	Kyrgyzstan	4:40.78	+1:45.28	
125	99	Klaus Jungbluth	Ecuador	4:42.20	+1:46.70	
126	119	Ioannis Karamichos	Greece	4:43.63	+1:48.13	
127	125	Islam Turganbaev	Kyrgyzstan	4:43.89	+1:48.39	
128	120	Mehdi Tir	Iran	4:48.90	+1:53.40	
129	104	Salim Lozom	Lebanon	4:48.98	+1:53.48	
130	137	Filipe Cabrita	Portugal	4:57.80	+2:02.30	
131	127	Guillermo Racero	Venezuela	5:01.46	+2:05.96	
132	133	Antonio Pineyro	Mexico	5:16.07	+2:20.57	
133	138	Nicholas Lau	Trinidad and Tobago	5:45.22	+2:49.72	
	113	Elie Tawk	Lebanon	Did not start		
	123	Artur Saparbekov	Kyrgyzstan	Did not start		
	128	Tadevos Poghosyan	Armenia	Did not start		
	136	Ricardo Jay Lung	Panama	Did not start		
	139	Rakan Alireza	Saudi Arabia	Did not start		
	96	Joe Tawk	Lebanon	Disqualified		

=== Quarterfinals ===
The top two of each heat and the two best-timed skiers advanced to the semifinals.

==== Quarterfinal 1 ====
Rank	Seed	Athlete	Country	Time	Deficit	Notes
1	1	Erik Valnes	Norway	2:59.30		Q
2	2	Johannes Høsflot Klæbo	Norway	2:59.73	+0.43	Q
3	25	Ville Ahonen	Finland	2:59.85	+0.55	q
4	28	Graham Ritchie	Canada	3:04.16	+4.86	
5	23	Luděk Šeller	Czech Republic	3:08.33	+9.03	
6	18	Edvin Anger	Sweden	3:49.32	+50.02	

==== Quarterfinal 2 ====
Rank	Seed	Athlete	Country	Time	Deficit	Notes
1	5	Calle Halfvarsson	Sweden	2:59.83		Q
2	14	Even Northug	Norway	3:00.19	+0.36	Q
3	19	Richard Jouve	France	3:01.16	+1.33	
4	16	Federico Pellegrino	Italy	3:02.07	+2.24	
5	26	Lukas Mrkonjic	Austria	3:05.35	+5.52	
6	29	Janosch Brugger	Germany	3:05.79	+5.96	

==== Quarterfinal 3 ====
Rank	Seed	Athlete	Country	Time	Deficit	Notes
1	8	Lucas Chanavat	France	3:01.00		Q
2	3	Pål Golberg	Norway	3:01.10	+0.10	Q
3	27	Kamil Bury	Poland	3:01.50	+0.50	
4	12	Simone Mocellini	Italy	3:01.79	+0.79	
5	30	Marko Kilp	Estonia	3:04.55	+3.55	
6	6	Ben Ogden	United States	3:05.21	+4.21	

==== Quarterfinal 4 ====
Rank	Seed	Athlete	Country	Time	Deficit	Notes
1	7	Jules Chappaz	France	2:58.81		Q
2	4	Michal Novák	Czech Republic	2:58.94	+0.13	Q
3	24	Marcus Grate	Sweden	2:59.00	+0.19	q
4	17	Francesco De Fabiani	Italy	3:00.15	+1.34	
5	21	Miha Šimenc	Slovenia	3:26.33	+27.52	
6	10	Håvard Solås Taugbøl	Norway	3:56.09	+57.28	

==== Quarterfinal 5 ====
Rank	Seed	Athlete	Country	Time	Deficit	Notes
1	20	Renaud Jay	France	3:03.67		Q
2	15	JC Schoonmaker	United States	3:06.09	+2.42	Q
3	13	Johan Häggström	Sweden	3:07.39	+3.72	
4	22	Joni Mäki	Finland	3:10.42	+6.75	
5	9	Niilo Moilanen	Finland	3:11.66	+7.99	
6	11	Ondřej Černý	Czech Republic	3:18.97	+15.30	

=== Semifinals ===
The top two of each heat and the two best-timed skiers advanced to the final.

==== Semifinal 1 ====
Rank	Seed	Athlete	Country	Time	Deficit	Notes
1	2	Johannes Høsflot Klæbo	Norway	2:58.95		Q
2	5	Calle Halfvarsson	Sweden	2:59.38	+0.43	Q
3	8	Lucas Chanavat	France	2:59.60	+0.65	q
4	14	Even Northug	Norway	3:01.09	+2.14	
5	25	Ville Ahonen	Finland	3:06.23	+7.28	
6	1	Erik Valnes	Norway	4:43.29	+1:44.34	

==== Semifinal 2 ====
Rank	Seed	Athlete	Country	Time	Deficit	Notes
1	7	Jules Chappaz	France	2:59.05		Q
2	3	Pål Golberg	Norway	2:59.23	+0.18	Q
3	4	Michal Novák	Czech Republic	2:59.33	+0.28	q
4	20	Renaud Jay	France	3:03.06	+4.01	
5	15	JC Schoonmaker	United States	3:06.76	+7.71	
6	24	Marcus Grate	Sweden	3:10-41	+11.36	

=== Final ===
Rank	Seed	Athlete	Country	Time	Deficit	Notes
1st place, gold medalist(s)	2	Johannes Høsflot Klæbo	Norway	2:56.07		
2nd place, silver medalist(s)	3	Pål Golberg	Norway	2:58.29	+2.22	
3rd place, bronze medalist(s)	7	Jules Chappaz	France	2:58.31	+2.24	
4	4	Michal Novák	Czech Republic	3:01.97	+5.90	
5	5	Calle Halfvarsson	Sweden	3:07.71	+11.64	
6	8	Lucas Chanavat	France	3:28.34	+32.27	
