= Indulis Bikše =

Latvian distance skier (born 1995)

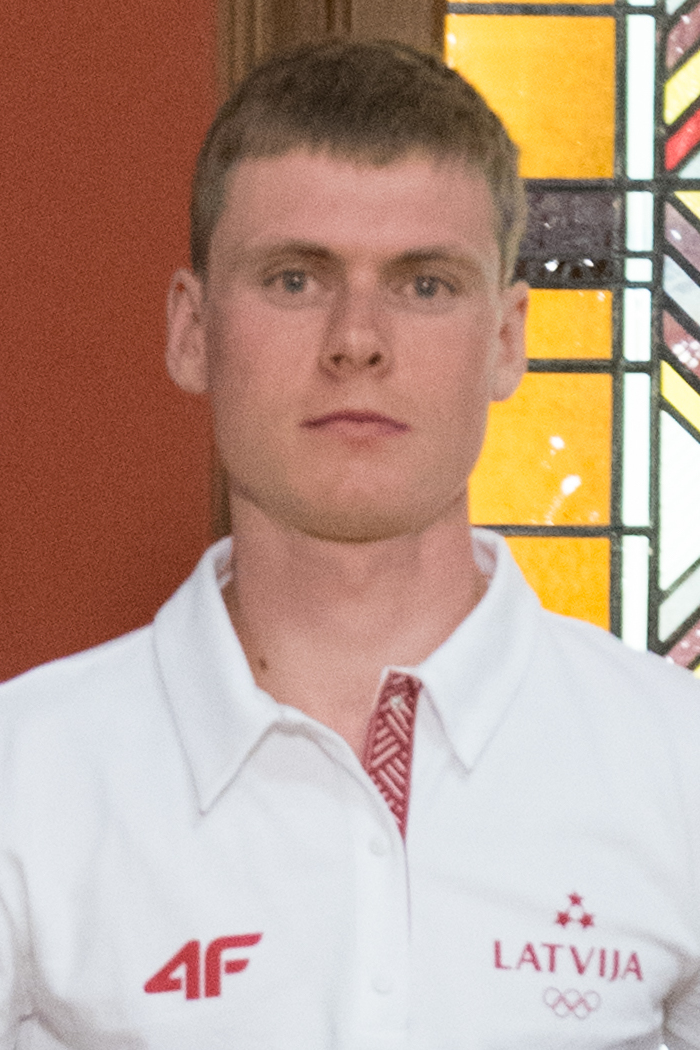
- Bikše in 2018
- Born: 15 September 1995 (age 29); Madona, Latvia
- Height: 177 cm (5 ft 10 in)

Indulis Bikše (born 15 September 1995) is a cross-country skier from Madona, Latvia. He started skiing at three and his father is also a skier. Indulis Bikše competed for Latvia at the 2018 Winter Olympics.
