= FIS Nordic World Ski Championships 2021 – Men's 4 × 10 kilometre relay =

Men's 4 × 10 kilometre relay at the FIS Nordic World Ski Championships 2021
- Location: Oberstdorf, Germany
- Date: 5 March
- Competitors: 72 from 18 nations
- Teams: 18
- Winning time: 1:52:39.0

Medalists
gold medal	Pål Golberg; Emil Iversen; Hans Christer Holund; Johannes Høsflot Klæbo	Norway
silver medal	Aleksey Chervotkin; Ivan Yakimushkin; Artem Maltsev; Alexander Bolshunov
bronze medal	Hugo Lapalus; Maurice Manificat; Clément Parisse; Jules Lapierre	France

The Men's 4 × 10 kilometre relay competition at the FIS Nordic World Ski Championships 2021 was held on 5 March 2021.

== Results ==
The race was started at 13:15.

Rank	Bib	Country	Time	Deficit
1st place, gold medalist(s)	1	Norway; Pål Golberg; Emil Iversen; Hans Christer Holund; Johannes Høsflot Klæbo	1:52:39.0; 28:27.0; 26:58.7; 28:14.5; 28:58.8	
2nd place, silver medalist(s)	2	Russian Ski Federation; Aleksey Chervotkin; Ivan Yakimushkin; Artem Maltsev; Alexander Bolshunov	1:52:51.0; 27:30.4; 28:18.9; 28:25.9; 28:35.8	+12.0
3rd place, bronze medalist(s)	3	France; Hugo Lapalus; Maurice Manificat; Clément Parisse; Jules Lapierre	1:53:51.6; 28:15.4; 27:24.9; 28:25.4; 29:45.9	+1:12.6
4	5	Sweden; Johan Häggström; Oskar Svensson; Jens Burman; William Poromaa	1:53:55.5; 28:24.9; 27:22.3; 28:18.7; 29:49.6	+1:16.5
5	8	Switzerland; Beda Klee; Dario Cologna; Jason Rüesch; Roman Furger	1:54:11.2; 28:15.8; 27:22.7; 28:41.8; 29:50.9	+1:32.2
6	4	Finland; Ristomatti Hakola; Iivo Niskanen; Perttu Hyvärinen; Joni Mäki	1:54:28.4; 28:15.1; 27:11.0; 28:48.6; 30:13.7	+1:49.4
7	6	Germany; Jonas Dobler; Janosch Brugger; Lucas Bögl; Friedrich Moch	1:55:16.9; 28:16.3; 28:14.8; 29:27.1; 29:18.7	+2:37.9
8	9	United States; David Norris; Scott Patterson; Simi Hamilton; Gus Schumacher	1:55:32.7; 28:28.1; 28:04.8; 29:25.8; 29:34.0	+2:53.7
9	17	Japan; Naoto Baba; Hiroyuki Miyazawa; Takatsugu Uda; Keishin Yoshida	1:56:58.3; 28:28.8; 28:30.5; 30:12.4; 29:46.6	+4:19.3
10	11	Canada; Graham Ritchie; Antoine Cyr; Russell Kennedy; Rémi Drolet	1:57:10.9; 28:17.4; 27:56.4; 29:44.5; 31:12.6	+4:31.9
11	10	Czech Republic; Michal Novák; Adam Fellner; Petr Knop; Jan Pechoušek	1:57:37.1; 28:17.0; 28:15.2; 29:22.7; 31:42.2	+4:58.1
12	7	Kazakhstan; Yevgeniy Velichko; Vitaliy Pukhkalo; Olzhas Klimin; Nail Bashmakov	2:00:20.2; 28:26.6; 28:04.6; 31:58.9; 31:50.1	+7:41.2
13	15	Estonia; Marko Kilp; Kaarel Kasper Kõrge; Alvar Johannes Alev; Martin Himma	2:00:50.9; 29:03.9; 29:34.6; 30:38.4; 31:34.0	+8:11.9
14	18	Poland; Maciej Staręga; Kamil Bury; Dominik Bury; Mateusz Haratyk	LAP; 30:09.4; 31:16.2; 31:04.8	
15	16	Latvia; Raimo Vīgants; Indulis Bikše; Niks Saulītis; Lauris Kaparkalējs	LAP; 29:04.2; 30:48.4	
16	14	Hungary; Ádám Kónya; Kristóf Lágler; Soma Gyallai; Ádám Büki	LAP; 32:15.4; 33:21.2	
17	12	Lithuania; Modestas Vaičiulis; Tautvydas Strolia; Edvinas Simonutis; Paulius Januškevičius	LAP; 32:59.5; 32:47.8	
18	13	Brazil; Manex Silva; Steve Hiestand; Matheus Vasconcellos; Victor Santos	LAP; 33:38.3	
