= Cross-country skiing at the 2018 Winter Olympics – Men's team sprint =

Men's team sprint at the XXIII Olympic Winter Games
- Cross-country skiing
- Venue: Alpensia Cross-Country Skiing Centre
- Dates: 21 February 2018
- Competitors: 56 from 28 nations
- Winning time: 15:56.26

Medalists
| 1st place, gold medalist(s) | | Martin Johnsrud Sundby; Johannes Høsflot Klæbo | Norway |
| 2nd place, silver medalist(s) | | Denis Spitsov; Alexander Bolshunov | Olympic Athletes from Russia |
| 3rd place, bronze medalist(s) | | Maurice Manificat; Richard Jouve | France |

The men's team sprint freestyle cross-country skiing competition at the 2018 Winter Olympics was held on 21 February 2018 at 17:00 KST at the Alpensia Cross-Country Skiing Centre in Pyeongchang, South Korea. The event consisted of 6 by 1.4 km sprints alternating between 2 teammates.

== Qualification ==
A total of up to 310 cross-country skiers qualified across all eleven events. Athletes qualified for this event by having met the A qualification standard, which meant having 100 or less FIS Points The Points list takes into average the best results of athletes per discipline during the qualification period (1 July 2016 to 21 January 2018). Countries received additional quotas by having athletes ranked in the top 30 of the FIS Olympics Points list (two per gender maximum, overall across all events). Countries also received an additional quota (one per gender maximum) if an athlete was ranked in the top 300 of the FIS Olympics Points list. After the distribution of B standard quotas, the remaining quotas were distributed using the Olympic FIS Points list, with each athlete only counting once for qualification purposes. A country could only enter a maximum of one team for the sprint consisting of two athletes.

== Results ==
Q — qualified for next round
LL — lucky loser
PF — photo finish

=== Semifinals ===
| Rank | Heat | Bib | Country | Athletes | Time | Note |
|---|---|---|---|---|---|---|
| 1 | 1 | 15 | Olympic Athletes from Russia | Denis Spitsov; Alexander Bolshunov | 15:58.84 | Q |
| 2 | 1 | 16 | Sweden | Marcus Hellner; Calle Halfvarsson | 15:58.99 | Q |
| 3 | 1 | 19 | Germany | Sebastian Eisenlauer; Thomas Bing | 16:00.55 | LL |
| 4 | 1 | 18 | Finland | Martti Jylhä; Ristomatti Hakola | 16:01.41 | LL |
| 5 | 1 | 20 | Czech Republic | Martin Jakš; Aleš Razým | 16:08.78 | LL |
| 6 | 1 | 17 | Great Britain | Andrew Musgrave; Andrew Young | 16:30.62 | |
| 7 | 1 | 21 | Belarus | Michail Semenov; Yury Astapenka | 16:32.31 | |
| 8 | 1 | 22 | Austria | Bernhard Tritscher; Dominik Baldauf | 16:43.69 | |
| 9 | 1 | 24 | Romania | Paul Constantin Pepene; Alin Florin Cioancă | 16:52.38 | |
| 10 | 1 | 25 | Spain | Imanol Rojo; Martí Vigo del Arco | 16:59.83 | |
| 11 | 1 | 26 | Slovenia | Miha Šimenc; Janez Lampič | 17:24.79 | |
| 12 | 1 | 28 | Lithuania | Mantas Strolia; Modestas Vaičiulis | 17:41.73 | |
| 13 | 1 | 27 | South Korea | Kim Magnus; Kim Eun-ho | 17:56.71 | |
| 14 | 1 | 23 | Turkey | Ömer Ayçiçek; Hamza Dursun | 18:45.78 | |
| 1 | 2 | 1 | Norway | Martin Johnsrud Sundby; Johannes Høsflot Klæbo | 16:03.97 | Q |
| 2 | 2 | 4 | France | Maurice Manificat; Richard Jouve | 16:04.45 | Q |
| 3 | 2 | 6 | United States | Erik Bjornsen; Simi Hamilton | 16:04.69 | LL |
| 4 | 2 | 3 | Italy | Dietmar Nöckler; Federico Pellegrino | 16:07.19 | LL |
| 5 | 2 | 7 | Canada | Len Väljas; Alex Harvey | 16:07.24 | LL |
| 6 | 2 | 2 | Switzerland | Roman Furger; Dario Cologna | 16:10.52 | |
| 7 | 2 | 10 | Poland | Dominik Bury; Maciej Staręga | 16:21.83 | |
| 8 | 2 | 5 | Kazakhstan | Denis Volotka; Alexey Poltoranin | 16:30.10 | |
| 9 | 2 | 8 | Estonia | Marko Kilp; Karel Tammjärv | 16:30.30 | |
| 10 | 2 | 11 | Ukraine | Andriy Orlyk; Oleksiy Krasovsky | 17:32.50 | |
| 11 | 2 | 12 | Slovakia | Peter Mlynár; Andrej Segeč | 17:34.12 | |
| 12 | 2 | 9 | Bulgaria | Yordan Chuchuganov; Veselin Tzinzov | 17:38.26 | |
| 13 | 2 | 13 | Australia | Callum Watson; Phillip Bellingham | 17:38.36 | |
| 14 | 2 | 14 | China | Wang Qiang; Sun Qinghai | 18:11.95 | |

=== Final ===
The final started at 19:30.

| Rank | Bib | Country | Athletes | Time | Deficit |
|---|---|---|---|---|---|
| 1st place, gold medalist(s) | 1 | Norway | Martin Johnsrud Sundby; Johannes Høsflot Klæbo | 15:56.26 | — |
| 2nd place, silver medalist(s) | 15 | Olympic Athletes from Russia | Denis Spitsov; Alexander Bolshunov | 15:57.97 | +1.71 |
| 3rd place, bronze medalist(s) | 4 | France | Maurice Manificat; Richard Jouve | 15:58.28 | +2.02 |
| 4 | 16 | Sweden | Marcus Hellner; Calle Halfvarsson | 15:59.33 | +3.07 |
| 5 | 3 | Italy | Dietmar Nöckler; Federico Pellegrino | 16:14.81 | +18.55 |
| 6 | 6 | United States | Erik Bjornsen; Simi Hamilton | 16:16.98 | +20.72 |
| 7 | 20 | Czech Republic | Martin Jakš; Aleš Razým | 16:24.83 | +28.57 |
| 8 | 7 | Canada | Len Väljas; Alex Harvey | 16:31.86 | +35.60 |
| 9 | 18 | Finland | Martti Jylhä; Ristomatti Hakola | 16:32.30 | +36.04 |
| 10 | 19 | Germany | Sebastian Eisenlauer; Thomas Bing | 16:42.20 | +45.94 |
