= FIS Nordic World Ski Championships 2023 – Men's 50 kilometre classical =

Men's 50 kilometre classical at the FIS Nordic World Ski Championships 2023
- Venue: Planica Nordic Centre
- Location: Planica, Slovenia
- Dates: 5 March
- Competitors: 49 from 22 nations
- Winning time: 2:01:30.2

Medalists
gold medal	Pål Golberg	Norway
silver medal	Johannes Høsflot Klæbo	Norway
bronze medal	William Poromaa	Sweden

The Men's 50 kilometre classical competition at the FIS Nordic World Ski Championships 2023 was held on 5 March 2023.

== Results ==
The race was started at 12:00.

Rank	Bib	Athlete	Country	Time	Deficit
1st place, gold medalist(s)	2	Pål Golberg	Norway	2:01:30.2	
2nd place, silver medalist(s)	1	Johannes Høsflot Klæbo	Norway	2:01:31.2	+1.0
3rd place, bronze medalist(s)	4	William Poromaa	Sweden	2:01:31.4	+1.2
4	11	Calle Halfvarsson	Sweden	2:01:31.8	+1.6
5	5	Martin Løwstrøm Nyenget	Norway	2:01:36.4	+6.2
6	16	Iivo Niskanen	Finland	2:01:39.6	+9.4
7	3	Didrik Tønseth	Norway	2:01:41.8	+11.6
8	14	Jens Burman	Sweden	2:02:12.9	+42.7
9	28	Théo Schely	France	2:02:24.5	+54.3
10	7	Federico Pellegrino	Italy	2:03:16.4	+1:46.2
11	10	Francesco De Fabiani	Italy	2:03:16.8	+1:46.6
12	19	Naoto Baba	Japan	2:03:18.9	+1:48.7
13	12	Emil Iversen	Norway	2:03:35.0	+2:04.8
14	27	Irineu Esteve Altimiras	Andorra	2:04:07.9	+2:37.7
15	43	Snorri Einarsson	Iceland	2:04:08.7	+2:38.5
16	15	Scott Patterson	United States	2:04:10.4	+2:40.2
17	13	Clément Parisse	France	2:04:23.6	+2:53.4
18	31	Thomas Maloney Westgård	Ireland	2:04:26.7	+2:56.5
19	24	Mika Vermeulen	Austria	2:04:57.2	+3:27.0
20	20	Dietmar Nöckler	Italy	2:05:20.6	+3:50.4
21	29	Jonas Dobler	Germany	2:05:43.7	+4:13.5
22	37	David Norris	United States	2:05:49.1	+4:18.9
23	26	Olivier Léveillé	Canada	2:05:55.0	+4:24.8
24	21	Beda Klee	Switzerland	2:06:41.4	+5:11.2
25	33	Albert Kuchler	Germany	2:06:41.6	+5:11.4
26	9	Hugo Lapalus	France	2:06:44.4	+5:14.2
27	35	Jonas Baumann	Switzerland	2:07:08.1	+5:37.9
28	25	Gus Schumacher	United States	2:07:15.3	+5:45.1
29	32	Ryo Hirose	Japan	2:07:26.5	+5:56.3
30	18	Eric Rosjö	Sweden	2:07:36.4	+6:06.2
31	22	Hunter Wonders	United States	2:07:45.9	+6:15.7
32	23	Maurice Manificat	France	2:08:25.8	+6:55.6
33	40	Ristomatti Hakola	Finland	2:09:46.8	+8:16.6
34	6	Andrew Musgrave	Great Britain	2:09:47.1	+8:16.9
35	36	Alvar Johannes Alev	Estonia	2:09:54.8	+8:24.6
36	17	Antoine Cyr	Canada	2:10:26.8	+8:56.6
37	34	Giandomenico Salvadori	Italy	2:11:31.5	+10:01.3
38	30	Dominik Bury	Poland	2:11:33.0	+10:02.8
39	45	Miha Ličef	Slovenia	2:11:41.5	+10:11.3
40	47	Fedor Karpov	Kazakhstan	2:12:00.6	+10:30.4
41	42	Vladislav Kovalyov	Kazakhstan	2:12:21.6	+10:51.4
42	41	Imanol Rojo	Spain	2:14:43.4	+13:13.2
43	44	Olzhas Klimin	Kazakhstan	2:15:24.7	+13:54.5
44	46	Mikayel Mikayelyan	Armenia	2:16:46.0	+15:15.8
45	51	Jošt Mulej	Slovenia	2:21:38.9	+20:08.7
46	50	Franco Dal Farra	Argentina	2:22:53.6	+21:23.4
	48	Miha Šimenc	Slovenia	Did not finish	
	39	Ville Ahonen	Finland	Did not finish	
	8	Perttu Hyvärinen	Finland	Did not finish	
	49	Kaarel Kasper Kõrge	Estonia	Did not start	
	38	Nail Bashmakov	Kazakhstan	Did not start	
