= FIS Nordic World Ski Championships 2021 – Men's 15 kilometre freestyle =

Men's 15 kilometre freestyle at the FIS Nordic World Ski Championships 2021
- Location: Oberstdorf, Germany
- Dates: 24 February (qualification); 3 March
- Competitors: 106 from 39 nations
- Winning time: 33:48.7

Medalists
| gold medal | Hans Christer Holund | Norway |
| silver medal | Simen Hegstad Krüger | Norway |
| bronze medal | Harald Østberg Amundsen | Norway |

The Men's 15 kilometre freestyle competition at the FIS Nordic World Ski Championships 2021 was held on 3 March. A qualification was held on 24 February 2021.

== Results ==
=== Final ===
The final was started on 3 March at 13:15.

| Rank | Bib | Athlete | Country | Time | Deficit |
|---|---|---|---|---|---|
| 1st place, gold medalist(s) | 40 | Hans Christer Holund | Norway | 33:48.7 | |
| 2nd place, silver medalist(s) | 38 | Simen Hegstad Krüger | Norway | 34:08.9 | +20.2 |
| 3rd place, bronze medalist(s) | 10 | Harald Østberg Amundsen | Norway | 34:24.3 | +35.6 |
| 4 | 22 | Alexander Bolshunov | Russian Ski Federation | 34:32.4 | +43.7 |
| 5 | 30 | Artem Maltsev | Russian Ski Federation | 34:39.4 | +50.7 |
| 6 | 28 | Sjur Røthe | Norway | 34:44.0 | +55.3 |
| 7 | 19 | Martin Johnsrud Sundby | Norway | 34:44.6 | +55.9 |
| 8 | 20 | Jens Burman | Sweden | 34:45.6 | +56.9 |
| 9 | 8 | William Poromaa | Sweden | 34:51.4 | +1:02.7 |
| 10 | 36 | Andrew Musgrave | Great Britain | 34:55.0 | +1:06.3 |
| 11 | 24 | Ivan Yakimushkin | Russian Ski Federation | 34:56.2 | +1:07.5 |
| 12 | 26 | Andrey Melnichenko | Russian Ski Federation | 35:00.8 | +1:12.1 |
| 13 | 34 | Dario Cologna | Switzerland | 35:01.9 | +1:13.2 |
| 14 | 46 | Clément Parisse | France | 35:03.4 | +1:14.7 |
| 15 | 12 | Irineu Esteve Altimiras | Andorra | 35:07.7 | +1:19.0 |
| 16 | 32 | Maurice Manificat | France | 35:12.9 | +1:24.2 |
| 17 | 16 | Perttu Hyvärinen | Finland | 35:13.1 | +1:24.4 |
| 18 | 48 | Iivo Niskanen | Finland | 35:13.6 | +1:24.9 |
| 19 | 7 | Naoto Baba | Japan | 35:21.1 | +1:32.4 |
| 20 | 5 | Jason Rüesch | Switzerland | 35:41.5 | +1:52.8 |
| 21 | 42 | Hugo Lapalus | France | 35:43.2 | +1:54.5 |
| 22 | 15 | Adrien Backscheider | France | 35:44.8 | +1:56.1 |
| 23 | 18 | Jonas Dobler | Germany | 35:46.5 | +1:57.8 |
| 24 | 4 | Friedrich Moch | Germany | 35:50.7 | +2:02.0 |
| 25 | 3 | Beda Klee | Switzerland | 35:50.9 | +2:02.2 |
| 26 | 44 | Florian Notz | Germany | 36:03.7 | +2:15.0 |
| 27 | 39 | Scott Patterson | United States | 36:10.7 | +2:22.0 |
| 28 | 50 | Lucas Bögl | Germany | 36:19.0 | +2:30.3 |
| 28 | 47 | Markus Vuorela | Finland | 36:19.0 | +2:30.3 |
| 30 | 55 | Russell Kennedy | Canada | 36:22.8 | +2:34.1 |
| 31 | 63 | Simi Hamilton | United States | 36:22.9 | +2:34.2 |
| 32 | 31 | Dominik Bury | Poland | 36:30.9 | +2:42.2 |
| 33 | 43 | Imanol Rojo | Spain | 36:34.5 | +2:45.8 |
| 34 | 58 | David Norris | United States | 36:36.3 | +2:47.6 |
| 35 | 13 | Michal Novák | Czech Republic | 36:39.8 | +2:51.1 |
| 36 | 41 | Paul Constantin Pepene | Romania | 36:42.7 | +2:54.0 |
| 37 | 45 | Karl-Johan Westberg | Sweden | 36:43.5 | +2:54.8 |
| 38 | 9 | Björn Sandström | Sweden | 36:44.4 | +2:55.7 |
| 39 | 73 | Takatsugu Uda | Japan | 36:45.7 | +2:57.0 |
| 40 | 35 | Hiroyuki Miyazawa | Japan | 36:49.0 | +3:00.3 |
| 41 | 1 | Thomas Hjalmar Westgård | Ireland | 36:49.5 | +3:00.8 |
| 42 | 27 | Mika Vermeulen | Austria | 37:11.8 | +3:23.1 |
| 43 | 51 | Petr Knop | Czech Republic | 37:15.0 | +3:26.3 |
| 44 | 60 | Keishin Yoshida | Japan | 37:15.5 | +3:26.8 |
| 45 | 11 | Andrew Young | Great Britain | 37:29.2 | +3:40.5 |
| 46 | 52 | Adam Fellner | Czech Republic | 37:30.0 | +3:41.3 |
| 47 | 72 | Mikayel Mikayelyan | Armenia | 37:39.9 | +3:51.2 |
| 47 | 89 | Kaarel Kasper Kõrge | Estonia | 37:39.9 | +3:51.2 |
| 49 | 53 | Yevgeniy Velichko | Kazakhstan | 37:42.9 | +3:54.2 |
| 50 | 56 | Philippe Boucher | Canada | 37:48.9 | +4:00.2 |
| 51 | 14 | Gus Schumacher | United States | 37:51.0 | +4:02.3 |
| 52 | 64 | Rémi Drolet | Canada | 37:51.4 | +4:02.7 |
| 53 | 49 | Vitaliy Pukhkalo | Kazakhstan | 37:53.4 | +4:04.7 |
| 54 | 17 | Roman Furger | Switzerland | 38:01.8 | +4:13.1 |
| 55 | 54 | Jonáš Bešťák | Czech Republic | 38:06.4 | +4:17.7 |
| 56 | 66 | Alvar Johannes Alev | Estonia | 38:08.4 | +4:19.7 |
| 57 | 21 | Petrică Hogiu | Romania | 38:11.4 | +4:22.7 |
| 58 | 97 | Krešimir Crnković | Croatia | 38:12.1 | +4:23.4 |
| 59 | 23 | Snorri Einarsson | Iceland | 38:13.0 | +4:24.3 |
| 60 | 78 | Benjamin Črv | Slovenia | 38:13.9 | +4:25.2 |
| 61 | 57 | Raimo Vīgants | Latvia | 38:22.3 | +4:33.6 |
| 62 | 95 | James Clugnet | Great Britain | 38:37.4 | +4:48.7 |
| 63 | 29 | Olzhas Klimin | Kazakhstan | 38:40.3 | +4:51.6 |
| 64 | 59 | Ján Koristek | Slovakia | 38:41.3 | +4:52.6 |
| 65 | 87 | Indulis Bikše | Latvia | 38:50.3 | +5:01.6 |
| 66 | 65 | Martin Himma | Estonia | 38:57.5 | +5:08.8 |
| 67 | 77 | Graham Ritchie | Canada | 39:04.0 | +5:15.3 |
| 68 | 98 | Franco Dal Farra | Argentina | 39:19.6 | +5:30.9 |
| 69 | 62 | Nail Bashmakov | Kazakhstan | 39:20.3 | +5:31.6 |
| 70 | 82 | Simeon Deyanov | Bulgaria | 39:28.0 | +5:39.3 |
| 71 | 106 | Mark Chanloung | Thailand | 39:34.0 | +5:45.3 |
| 72 | 93 | Seve de Campo | Australia | 39:41.6 | +5:52.9 |
| 73 | 90 | Thibaut De Marre | Belgium | 39:45.3 | +5:56.6 |
| 74 | 70 | Mateusz Haratyk | Poland | 39:50.5 | +6:01.8 |
| 75 | 69 | Kim Eun-ho | South Korea | 39:53.8 | +6:05.1 |
| 76 | 83 | Vili Črv | Slovenia | 39:54.9 | +6:06.2 |
| 77 | 74 | Apostolos Angelis | Greece | 40:15.0 | +6:26.3 |
| 78 | 111 | Martin Møller | Denmark | 40:22.1 | +6:33.4 |
| 79 | 76 | Ruslan Perekhoda | Ukraine | 40:22.3 | +6:33.6 |
| 80 | 67 | Strahinja Erić | Bosnia and Herzegovina | 40:27.9 | +6:39.2 |
| 81 | 102 | Phillip Bellingham | Australia | 40:29.4 | +6:40.7 |
| 82 | 86 | Kacper Antolec | Poland | 40:34.2 | +6:45.5 |
| 83 | 79 | Jeong Jong-won | South Korea | 40:58.3 | +7:09.6 |
| 84 | 81 | Kim Min-woo | South Korea | 41:17.0 | +7:28.3 |
| 85 | 84 | Tadevos Poghosyan | Armenia | 41:17.1 | +7:28.4 |
| 86 | 92 | Aleksandar Ognyanov | Bulgaria | 41:29.9 | +7:41.2 |
| 87 | 71 | Ömer Ayçiçek | Turkey | 41:31.2 | +7:42.5 |
| 88 | 80 | Yusuf Emre Fırat | Turkey | 41:45.7 | +7:57.0 |
| 89 | 96 | Todor Malchov | Bulgaria | 41:50.8 | +8:02.1 |
| 90 | 104 | Niks Saulītis | Latvia | 41:58.8 | +8:10.1 |
| 91 | 68 | Hamza Dursun | Turkey | 41:59.3 | +8:10.6 |
| 92 | 99 | Daniel Peshkov | Bulgaria | 42:04.3 | +8:15.6 |
| 93 | 88 | Dmytro Drahun | Ukraine | 42:09.5 | +8:20.8 |
| 94 | 105 | Mark Pollock | Australia | 42:10.0 | +8:21.3 |
| 95 | 61 | Raul Mihai Popa | Romania | 42:16.8 | +8:28.1 |
| 96 | 101 | Albert Jónsson | Iceland | 42:28.1 | +8:39.4 |
| 97 | 107 | Lauris Kaparkalējs | Latvia | 42:38.6 | +8:49.9 |
| 98 | 85 | Amed Oğlağo | Turkey | 42:41.9 | +8:53.2 |
| 99 | 108 | Batmönkhiin Achbadrakh | Mongolia | 42:48.3 | +8:59.6 |
| 100 | 110 | Joachim Weel Rosbo | Denmark | 42:54.1 | +9:05.4 |
| 101 | 75 | Miloš Milosavljević | Serbia | 43:15.9 | +9:27.2 |
| 102 | 91 | Miloš Čolić | Bosnia and Herzegovina | 44:50.8 | +11:02.1 |
| | 33 | Joni Mäki | Finland | Did not finish | |
| | 94 | Nikolaos Tsourekas | Greece | Did not finish | |
| | 103 | Georgios Anastasiadis | Greece | Did not finish | |
| | 109 | Titouan Serot | Belgium | Did not finish | |
| | 2 | Stefano Gardener | Italy | Did not start | |
| | 6 | Giandomenico Salvadori | Italy | Did not start | |
| | 25 | Davide Graz | Italy | Did not start | |
| | 37 | Mirco Bertolina | Italy | Did not start | |
| | 100 | Marko Skender | Croatia | Did not start | |

=== Qualification ===
The qualification was started on 24 February at 10:30.

| Rank | Bib | Athlete | Country | Time | Deficit | Notes |
|---|---|---|---|---|---|---|
| 1 | 78 | Mark Chanloung | Thailand | 24:23.8 | | Q |
| 2 | 75 | Campbell Wright | New Zealand | 24:53.2 | +29.4 | Q |
| 3 | 1 | Martin Møller | Denmark | 25:17.0 | +53.2 | Q |
| 4 | 86 | Albert Jónsson | Iceland | 25:37.9 | +1:14.1 | Q |
| 5 | 32 | Joachim Weel Rosbo | Denmark | 26:09.2 | +1:45.4 | Q |
| 6 | 36 | Titouan Serot | Belgium | 26:09.8 | +1:46.0 | Q |
| 7 | 79 | Mark Pollock | Australia | 26:14.2 | +1:50.4 | Q |
| 8 | 66 | Batmönkhiin Achbadrakh | Mongolia | 26:14.3 | +1:50.5 | Q |
| 9 | 72 | Lauris Kaparkalējs | Latvia | 26:21.4 | +1:57.6 | Q |
| 10 | 80 | Niks Saulītis | Latvia | 26:23.8 | +2:00.0 | Q |
| 11 | 76 | Manex Silva | Brazil | 26:23.9 | +2:00.1 | |
| 12 | 68 | Kristóf Lágler | Hungary | 26:27.4 | +2:03.6 | |
| 12 | 83 | Ádám Kónya | Hungary | 26:27.4 | +2:03.6 | |
| 14 | 48 | Jacob Weel Rosbo | Denmark | 26:35.9 | +2:12.1 | |
| 15 | 71 | Seyed Sattar Seyd | Iran | 26:36.9 | +2:13.1 | |
| 16 | 77 | Dagur Benediktsson | Iceland | 26:37.5 | +2:13.7 | |
| 17 | 70 | Samuel Uduigowme Ikpefan | Nigeria | 26:44.0 | +2:20.2 | |
| 18 | 85 | Tautvydas Strolia | Lithuania | 26:53.0 | +2:29.2 | |
| 19 | 49 | Steve Hiestand | Brazil | 26:57.0 | +2:33.2 | |
| 20 | 33 | Soma Gyallai | Hungary | 27:01.4 | +2:37.6 | |
| 21 | 58 | Aleksandar Grbović | Montenegro | 27:02.8 | +2:39.0 | |
| 22 | 52 | Mathis Poutot | Belgium | 27:08.5 | +2:44.7 | |
| 23 | 63 | Timo Juhani Grönlund | Bolivia | 27:15.6 | +2:51.8 | |
| 24 | 69 | Ilvars Bisenieks | Latvia | 27:16.9 | +2:53.1 | |
| 25 | 44 | Ádám Büki | Hungary | 27:20.9 | +2:57.1 | |
| 26 | 50 | Hjalmar Michelsen | Denmark | 27:27.5 | +3:03.7 | |
| 27 | 54 | Gonzalo Ángel Gomez | Argentina | 27:31.5 | +3:07.7 | |
| 28 | 61 | Miloš Stević | Bosnia and Herzegovina | 27:41.5 | +3:17.7 | |
| 29 | 29 | Matheus Vasconcellos | Brazil | 27:46.0 | +3:22.2 | |
| 30 | 74 | Mario Matikanov | Bulgaria | 27:47.8 | +3:24.0 | |
| 31 | 64 | Spartak Voskanyan | Armenia | 27:53.9 | +3:30.1 | |
| 32 | 41 | Danial Saveh Shemshaki | Iran | 27:56.2 | +3:32.4 | |
| 33 | 46 | Rejhan Šmrković | Serbia | 27:58.9 | +3:35.1 | |
| 34 | 67 | Edvinas Simonutis | Lithuania | 28:01.0 | +3:37.2 | |
| 35 | 27 | Brian Kennedy | Ireland | 28:06.9 | +3:43.1 | |
| 36 | 57 | Petar Perušić | Croatia | 28:07.5 | +3:43.7 | |
| 37 | 53 | Kari Peters | Luxembourg | 28:10.7 | +3:46.9 | |
| 38 | 51 | Aleksandrs Artūrs Ļūļe | Latvia | 28:19.9 | +3:56.1 | |
| 39 | 45 | Otgonlkhagvayn Zolbayar | Mongolia | 28:28.5 | +4:04.7 | |
| 40 | 37 | Yasin Shemshaki | Iran | 28:37.7 | +4:13.9 | |
| 41 | 60 | Ivan Rankov | Bulgaria | 28:44.7 | +4:20.9 | |
| 42 | 15 | Andrew Theall | Colombia | 28:53.7 | +4:29.9 | |
| 43 | 21 | Jonathan Soto Moreno | Mexico | 28:57.7 | +4:33.9 | |
| 44 | 39 | Dimitris Velivassis | Greece | 29:06.3 | +4:42.5 | |
| 45 | 73 | Angelos Antoniadis | Greece | 29:11.1 | +4:47.3 | |
| 46 | 19 | Carlos Andrés Quintana | Colombia | 29:12.9 | +4:49.1 | |
| 47 | 25 | Kleanthis Karamichas | Greece | 29:13.3 | +4:49.5 | |
| 48 | 10 | José Cabeça | Portugal | 29:14.2 | +4:50.4 | |
| 49 | 62 | Mateo Lorenzo Sauma | Argentina | 29:18.6 | +4:54.8 | |
| 50 | 40 | Ivan Zaharija | Croatia | 29:19.2 | +4:55.4 | |
| 51 | 47 | Dimitar Rankov | Bulgaria | 29:22.7 | +4:58.9 | |
| 52 | 81 | Yonathan Jesús Fernández | Chile | 29:23.1 | +4:59.3 | |
| 53 | 43 | Dejvid Veličkovski | North Macedonia | 29:32.7 | +5:08.9 | |
| 54 | 20 | Elie Tawk | Lebanon | 29:36.3 | +5:12.5 | |
| 55 | 65 | Darko Krsteski | North Macedonia | 29:48.5 | +5:24.7 | |
| 56 | 30 | Alireza Moghdid | Iran | 29:57.0 | +5:33.2 | |
| 57 | 56 | Paulius Januškevičius | Lithuania | 30:01.9 | +5:38.1 | |
| 58 | 31 | Athanasios Gastis | Greece | 30:38.7 | +6:14.9 | |
| 59 | 55 | Andonaki Kostoski | North Macedonia | 30:53.2 | +6:29.4 | |
| 60 | 59 | Kristiyan Bozhilov | Bulgaria | 30:58.9 | +6:35.1 | |
| 61 | 34 | Dashdondogiin Mönkhgerel | Mongolia | 31:32.2 | +7:08.4 | |
| 62 | 23 | Đorđe Paunović | Serbia | 31:39.9 | +7:16.1 | |
| 63 | 82 | Stefan Anić | Bosnia and Herzegovina | 31:42.6 | +7:18.8 | |
| 64 | 28 | Klaus Jungbluth Rodriguez | Ecuador | 31:48.4 | +7:24.6 | |
| 65 | 42 | Paul Keyrouz | Lebanon | 31:52.1 | +7:28.3 | |
| 66 | 16 | Antonio Pineyro | Mexico | 32:02.0 | +7:38.2 | |
| 67 | 22 | Miloš Đorđević | Serbia | 32:03.1 | +7:39.3 | |
| 68 | 38 | Hrachya Panoyan | Armenia | 32:04.8 | +7:41.0 | |
| 69 | 9 | Pedro Montes de Oca | Mexico | 32:07.3 | +7:43.5 | |
| 70 | 17 | Jaime Luis Huerta Osorio | Peru | 32:16.1 | +7:52.3 | |
| 71 | 24 | Juan Luis Uberuaga | Chile | 32:26.5 | +8:02.7 | |
| 72 | 12 | Salim Lozom | Lebanon | 34:04.0 | +9:40.2 | |
| 73 | 6 | Nicholas Lau | Trinidad and Tobago | 34:07.0 | +9:43.2 | |
| 74 | 35 | Nikola Kostoski | North Macedonia | 34:24.4 | +10:00.6 | |
| 75 | 8 | André Gonçalves | Portugal | 35:10.4 | +10:46.6 | |
| 76 | 11 | Filipe Cabrita | Portugal | 35:11.0 | +10:47.2 | |
| 77 | 26 | Charbel Neemeh | Lebanon | 35:23.5 | +10:59.7 | |
| 78 | 14 | Nicolás Lazo | Chile | 35:37.5 | +11:13.7 | |
| 79 | 13 | Bayarsaikhany Ganbayar | Mongolia | 35:39.1 | +11:15.3 | |
| 80 | 2 | Warren Aubrey Samberg | Israel | 36:09.5 | +11:45.7 | |
| 81 | 3 | Nzumbe Nyanduga | Tanzania | 36:45.1 | +12:21.3 | |
| 82 | 5 | Rodrigo Rangel | Mexico | 36:45.6 | +12:21.8 | |
| 83 | 4 | Eduardo Arteaga | Venezuela | 37:01.1 | +12:37.3 | |
| 84 | 7 | Tang Wei Yan | Malaysia | 37:46.1 | +13:22.3 | |
| 85 | 18 | Benjamin Amestica | Chile | 39:39.7 | +15:15.9 | |
| | 84 | Victor Santos | Brazil | Did not finish | | |
