= 2018–19 Tour de Ski =

Cross-country skiing event

Tour de Ski
2018–19 FIS Cross-Country World Cup

Ski tour details
- Venue(s): Toblach, Italy; Val Müstair, Switzerland; Oberstdorf, Germany; Val di Fiemme, Italy
- Dates: 29 December 2018 – 6 January 2019
- Stages: 7

Results
Men
Jersey awarded to the men's overall winner	Winner	Johannes Høsflot Klæbo (NOR)
	Second	Sergey Ustiugov (RUS)
	Third	Simen Hegstad Krüger (NOR)
Jersey awarded to the men's sprint classification winner	Sprint	Johannes Høsflot Klæbo (NOR)
Women
Jersey awarded to the women's overall winner	Winner	Ingvild Flugstad Østberg (NOR)
	Second	Natalya Nepryayeva (RUS)
	Third	Krista Pärmäkoski (FIN)
Jersey awarded to the women's sprint classification winner	Sprint	Ingvild Flugstad Østberg (NOR)

The 2018–19 Tour de Ski was the 13th edition of the Tour de Ski and part of the 2018–19 FIS Cross-Country World Cup. The World Cup stage event began in Toblach, Italy on 29 December 2018 and concluded with the Final Climb stage in Val di Fiemme, Italy, on 6 January 2019. The tour was the first tour starting in Toblach. The overall tours were won for the first time by Ingvild Flugstad Østberg (Norway) and Johannes Høsflot Klæbo (Norway).

The opening stage was won by Stina Nilsson of Sweden and Johannes Høsflot Klæbo of Norway. Natalya Nepryayeva won the women's second stage and took over the lead in the overall standings. The men's second stage was won by Sergey Ustiugov, with fellow Russian Alexander Bolshunov taking over the leader's blue bib. The third stage was the second and last sprint race of the tour, again won by Nilsson and Klæbo. Klæbo's second victory of his Tour de Ski debut put him in the blue bib which he held for the rest of the tour. Jessie Diggins of the United States skied the fourth stage in the blue bib, but four consecutive wins on the four last stages for Norwegian Ingvild Flugstad Østberg made her the overall winner of the tour, with a record winning margin of 2 minutes 42 seconds. Klæbo won four of the seven stages and won the overall Tour de Ski on his first attempt. 22 years and 76 days old, Klæbo became the youngest ever winner of the overall standings.

== Schedule ==
Stage	Venue	Date	Event	Technique	Distance		Start time (CET)	
Stage	Venue	Date	Event	Technique	Women	Men	Women	Men
1	Toblach (ITA)	29 December 2018	Sprint	Freestyle	1.3 km	1.3 km	14:30	14:30
2	Toblach (ITA)	30 December 2018	Distance, interval start	Freestyle	10 km	15 km	12:45	14:45
3	Val Müstair (SUI)	1 January 2019	Sprint	Freestyle	1.4 km	1.4 km	12:00	12:00
4	Oberstdorf (GER)	2 January 2019	Distance, mass start	Classic	10 km	15 km	12:00	14:00
5	Oberstdorf (GER)	3 January 2019	Distance, pursuit	Freestyle	10 km	15 km	15:15	13:05
6	Val di Fiemme (ITA)	5 January 2019	Distance, mass start	Classic	10 km	15 km	14:00	15:10
7	Val di Fiemme (ITA)	6 January 2019	Final Climb, pursuit	Freestyle	9 km	9 km	13:00	14:45

== Overall leadership ==
Bonus seconds for the top 30 positions by type
Type		1	2	3	4	5	6	7	8	9	10	11	12	13–15	16–20	21–25	26–30
In finish	Interval start	15	10	5	none												
In finish	Mass start	15	10	5	none												
In finish	Pursuit (ex. FC)	15	10	5	none												
In finish	Sprint	60	54	48	46	44	42	32	30	28	26	24	22	10	8	6	4
Intermediate sprint	Mass start	15	12	10	8	6	5	4	3	2	1	none					

Two main individual competitions were contested in the 2018–19 Tour de Ski, as well as a team competition. The most important was the overall standings, calculated by adding each rider's finishing times on each stage. The skiers collect bonus seconds due to their finishing positions in every stage apart from the Final Climb. In the sprint stages, the winners were awarded 60 bonus seconds, while on distance stages the top three finishers would get 15, 10 and 5 seconds respectively. In mass start races, time bonuses were awarded to the ten first skiers to cross the intermediate sprint points. The skier with the lowest cumulative time would be the overall winner of the Tour de Ski. The skier leading the overall standings would wear a blue bib.

The second competition was the sprint standings. The skiers who received the highest number of bonus seconds during the Tour would win the sprint standings. The bonus seconds available for each stage finish were determined by the stage's type. The leader was identified by a grey bib.

The final competition was a team competition. This was calculated using the finishing times of the best two skiers of both genders per team on each stage; the leading team was the team with the lowest cumulative time.

A total of CHF 560,000, both genders included, was awarded in cash prizes in the race. The overall winners of the Tour de Ski received CHF 55,000, with the second and third placed skiers getting CHF 40,000 and CHF 27,500 respectively. All finishers in the top 20 were awarded money. The holders of the overall and sprint standings would benefit on each stage they led; the final winners of the sprint standings would be given CHF 6,000. CHF 3,000 was given to the winners of each stage of the race, with smaller amounts given to places 2 and 3.

Overall leadership by stage
Stage	Men			Women		
Stage	Winner	Overall standings	Sprint standings	Winner	Overall standings	Sprint standings
1	Johannes Høsflot Klæbo	Johannes Høsflot Klæbo	Johannes Høsflot Klæbo	Stina Nilsson	Stina Nilsson	Stina Nilsson
2	Sergey Ustiugov	Alexander Bolshunov	Johannes Høsflot Klæbo	Natalya Nepryayeva	Natalya Nepryayeva	Stina Nilsson
3	Johannes Høsflot Klæbo	Johannes Høsflot Klæbo	Johannes Høsflot Klæbo	Stina Nilsson	Jessie Diggins	Stina Nilsson
4	Emil Iversen	Johannes Høsflot Klæbo	Johannes Høsflot Klæbo	Ingvild Flugstad Østberg	Ingvild Flugstad Østberg	Stina Nilsson
5	Johannes Høsflot Klæbo	Johannes Høsflot Klæbo	Johannes Høsflot Klæbo	Ingvild Flugstad Østberg	Ingvild Flugstad Østberg	Ingvild Flugstad Østberg
6	Johannes Høsflot Klæbo	Johannes Høsflot Klæbo	Johannes Høsflot Klæbo	Ingvild Flugstad Østberg	Ingvild Flugstad Østberg	Ingvild Flugstad Østberg
7	Sjur Røthe	Johannes Høsflot Klæbo	Johannes Høsflot Klæbo	Ingvild Flugstad Østberg	Ingvild Flugstad Østberg	Ingvild Flugstad Østberg
Final		Johannes Høsflot Klæbo	Johannes Høsflot Klæbo	Final	Ingvild Flugstad Østberg	Ingvild Flugstad Østberg

Men

- In stages two and four Richard Jouve, who was second in the sprint standings, wore the grey bib, because first placed Johannes Høsflot Klæbo wore the blue bib as the leader of the overall standings.
- In stage five Sindre Bjørnestad Skar, who was third in the sprint standings, wore the grey bib, because first placed Klæbo wore the blue bib as the leader of the overall standings and second placed Emil Iversen withdrew after the fourth stage.
- In stage six and seven Alexander Bolshunov, who was second in the sprint standings, wore the grey bib, because first placed Klæbo wore the blue bib as the leader of the overall standings.

Women

- In stage two Ida Ingemarsdotter, who was second in the sprint standings, wore the grey bib, because first placed Stina Nilsson wore the blue bib as the leader of the overall standings.
- In stage five Jessie Diggins, who was second in the sprint standings, wore the grey bib, because first placed Nilsson withdrew after the fourth stage.
- In stages six and seven Diggins, who was second in the sprint standings, wore the grey bib, because first placed Ingvild Flugstad Østberg wore the blue bib as leader of the overall standings.

== Final standings ==
Legend
Denotes the winner of the Overall standings	Denotes the winner of the Sprint standings

=== Overall standings ===
==== Men ====
Final overall standings (1–10)
Rank	Name	Time
1	Johannes Høsflot Klæbo (NOR)	3:07:59.4
2	Sergey Ustiugov (RUS)	+16.7
3	Simen Hegstad Krüger (NOR)	+48.8
4	Sjur Røthe (NOR)	+1:05.3
5	Alexander Bolshunov (RUS)	+1:26.6
6	Andrey Melnichenko (RUS)	+1:37.7
7	Martin Johnsrud Sundby (NOR)	+2:04.7
8	Denis Spitsov (RUS)	+2:05.9
9	Francesco De Fabiani (ITA)	+2:18.5
10	Andrey Larkov (RUS)	+2:34.6

Final overall standings (11–43)
Rank	Name	Time
11	Didrik Tønseth (NOR)	+2:39.0
12	Hans Christer Holund (NOR)	+2:47.1
13	Florian Notz (GER)	+3:37.5
14	Jules Lapierre (FRA)	+3:43.4
15	Jean-Marc Gaillard (FRA)	+3:58.4
16	Calle Halfvarsson (SWE)	+4:07.5
17	Andrew Musgrave (GBR)	+4:23.5
18	Viktor Thorn (SWE)	+4:29.7
19	Maxim Vylegzhanin (RUS)	+4:59.3
20	Finn Hågen Krogh (NOR)	+5:01.8
21	Maurice Manificat (FRA)	+5:07.7
22	Lucas Bögl (GER)	+5:22.4
23	Andrey Sobakarev (RUS)	+5:39.5
24	Irineu Esteve Altimiras (AND)	+5:42.5
25	Adrien Backscheider (FRA)	+5:57.3
26	Jonas Dobler (GER)	+6:09.2
27	Clément Parisse (FRA)	+6:30.5
28	Daniel Rickardsson (SWE)	+6:52.9
29	Andreas Katz (GER)	+7:09.9
30	Keishin Yoshida (JPN)	+8:11.0
31	Toni Livers (SUI)	+8:21.8
32	Jonas Baumann (SUI)	+8:25.1
33	Alexander Bessmertnykh (RUS)	+8:58.0
34	Stefano Gardener (ITA)	+9:05.7
35	Giandomenico Salvadori (ITA)	+9:06.0
36	Hiroyuki Miyazawa (JPN)	+9:45.8
37	Snorri Einarsson (ISL)	+10:37.3
38	Karl-Johan Westberg (SWE)	+10:50.3
39	Petr Knop (CZE)	+11:33.9
40	Adam Fellner (CZE)	+12:22.2
41	Simon Lageson (SWE)	+13:50.2
42	Benjamin Lustgarten (USA)	+15:54.5
43	Indulis Bikše (LAT)	+22:40.7

==== Women ====
Final overall standings (1–10)
Rank	Name	Time
1	Ingvild Flugstad Østberg (NOR)	2:30:31.2
2	Natalya Nepryayeva (RUS)	+2:42.0
3	Krista Pärmäkoski (FIN)	+2:55.9
4	Anastasia Sedova (RUS)	+3:53.2
5	Yuliya Belorukova (RUS)	+4:47.4
6	Jessie Diggins (USA)	+5:13.5
7	Heidi Weng (NOR)	+6:49.3
8	Masako Ishida (JPN)	+9:16.2
9	Kari Øyre Slind (NOR)	+9:30.5
10	Mariya Istomina (RUS)	+9:45.0

Final overall standings (11–28)
Rank	Name	Time
11	Laura Mononen (FIN)	+9:45.1
12	Anna Nechaevskaya (RUS)	+9:57.2
13	Moa Molander Kristiansen (SWE)	+10:05.6
14	Lisa Vinsa (SWE)	+10:18.0
15	Nathalie von Siebenthal (SUI)	+10:19.1
16	Tiril Udnes Weng (NOR)	+10:55.3
17	Pia Fink (GER)	+10:58.4
18	Anouk Faivre-Picon (FRA)	+11:17.6
19	Lidia Durkina (RUS)	+11:37.7
20	Caterina Ganz (ITA)	+11:47.0
21	Alenka Čebašek (SLO)	+12:08.1
22	Anamarija Lampič (SLO)	+12:25.9
23	Kateřina Razýmová (CZE)	+13:24.7
24	Elena Soboleva (RUS)	+13:41.4
25	Emily Nishikawa (CAN)	+13:54.9
26	Mia Eriksson (SWE)	+15:19.8
27	Sara Pellegrini (ITA)	+16:29.0
28	Sandra Schützová (CZE)	+17:16.2

=== Sprint standings ===
==== Men ====
Final sprint standings (1–10)
Rank	Name	Total
1	Johannes Høsflot Klæbo (NOR)	3:12
2	Alexander Bolshunov (RUS)	1:50
3	Sergey Ustiugov (RUS)	1:36
4	Finn Hågen Krogh (NOR)	0:48
5	Francesco De Fabiani (ITA)	0:47
6	Simen Hegstad Krüger (NOR)	0:40
7	Didrik Tønseth (NOR)	0:36
8	Sjur Røthe (NOR)	0:34
9	Calle Halfvarsson (SWE)	0:21
10	Karl-Johan Westberg (SWE)	0:22

==== Women ====
Final sprint standings (1–10)
Rank	Name	Total
1	Ingvild Flugstad Østberg (NOR)	2:19
2	Jessie Diggins (USA)	1:46
3	Natalya Nepryayeva (RUS)	1:45
4	Yuliya Belorukova (RUS)	1:32
5	Krista Pärmäkoski (FIN)	1:10
6	Anamarija Lampič (SLO)	0:42
7	Tiril Udnes Weng (NOR)	0:37
8	Anastasia Sedova (RUS)	0:32
9	Alenka Čebašek (SLO)	0:28
10	Heidi Weng (NOR)	0:13

=== Team standings ===
Final team standings (1–5)
Rank	Nation	Time
1	Norway	11:16:25.6
2	Russia	+2:43.1
3	Sweden	+22:23.5
4	Italy	+35:15.9
5	Czech Republic	+54:46.4

== Stages ==
=== Stage 1 ===
29 December 2018, Toblach, Italy

- Bonus seconds to the 30 skiers that qualifies for the quarter-finals, distributed as following:
  - Final: 60–54–48–46–44–42
  - Semi-final: 32–30–28–26–24–22
  - Quarter-final: 10–10–10–8–8–8–8–8–6–6–6–6–6–4–4–4–4–4

Men – 1.3 km Sprint Freestyle
Rank	Name	Time	BS
1	Johannes Høsflot Klæbo (NOR)	2:17.99	60
2	Richard Jouve (FRA)	+0.34	54
3	Lucas Chanavat (FRA)	+0.39	48
4	Sindre Bjørnestad Skar (NOR)	+0.76	46
5	Emil Iversen (NOR)	+1.67	44
6	Alexander Bolshunov (RUS)	+3.17	42

Women – 1.3 km Sprint Freestyle
Rank	Name	Time	BS
1	Stina Nilsson (SWE)	2:36.26	60
2	Ida Ingemarsdotter (SWE)	+3.00	54
3	Jessie Diggins (USA)	+3.07	48
4	Yuliya Belorukova (RUS)	+3.16	46
5	Linn Sömskar (SWE)	+3.26	44
6	Sadie Bjornsen (USA)	+3.40	42

=== Stage 2 ===
30 December 2018, Toblach, Italy

- Bonus seconds in finish: 15–10–5 to the 3 fastest skiers.

Men – 15 km Freestyle (individual)
Rank	Name	Time	BS
1	Sergey Ustiugov (RUS)	30:34.1	15
2	Simen Hegstad Krüger (NOR)	+12.2	10
3	Alexander Bolshunov (RUS)	+21.9	5
4	Andrey Melnichenko (RUS)	+27.4	
5	Didrik Tønseth (NOR)	+28.0	
6	Clément Parisse (FRA)	+30.1	
7	Denis Spitsov (RUS)	+33.7	
8	Calle Halfvarsson (SWE)	+43.0	
9	Florian Notz (GER)	+44.9	
10	Martin Johnsrud Sundby (NOR)	+45.2	

Women – 10 km Freestyle (individual)
Rank	Name	Time	BS
1	Natalya Nepryayeva (RUS)	23:19.9	15
2	Ingvild Flugstad Østberg (NOR)	+0.3	10
3	Anastasia Sedova (RUS)	+10.9	5
4	Krista Pärmäkoski (FIN)	+17.4	
5	Heidi Weng (NOR)	+21.2	
6	Jessie Diggins (USA)	+27.2	
7	Yuliya Belorukova (RUS)	+36.1	
8	Nathalie von Siebenthal (SUI)	+44.0	
9	Kari Øyre Slind (NOR)	+49.0	
10	Katharina Hennig (GER)	+49.5	

=== Stage 3 ===
1 January 2019, Val Müstair, Switzerland

- Bonus seconds to the 30 skiers that qualifies for the quarter-finals, distributed as following:
  - Final: 60–54–48–46–44–42
  - Semi-final: 32–30–28–26–24–22
  - Quarter-final: 10–10–10–8–8–8–8–8–6–6–6–6–6–4–4–4–4–4

Men – 1.4 km Sprint Freestyle
Rank	Name	Time	BS
1	Johannes Høsflot Klæbo (NOR)	3:03.78	60
2	Federico Pellegrino (ITA)	+2.35	54
3	Sergey Ustiugov (RUS)	+3.07	48
4	Richard Jouve (FRA)	+3.08	46
5	Emil Iversen (NOR)	+3.61	44
6	Sindre Bjørnestad Skar (NOR)	+43.00	42

Women – 1.4 km Sprint Freestyle
Rank	Name	Time	BS
1	Stina Nilsson (SWE)	3:31.91	60
2	Sophie Caldwell (USA)	+2.27	54
3	Jessie Diggins (USA)	+2.27	48
4	Ingvild Flugstad Østberg (NOR)	+3.54	46
5	Maiken Caspersen Falla (NOR)	+4.58	44
6	Lotta Udnes Weng (NOR)	+20.73	42

=== Stage 4 ===
2 January 2019, Oberstdorf, Germany

Men – 15 km Classic (mass start)
Rank	Name	Time	BS
1	Emil Iversen (NOR)	45:30.3	21
2	Francesco De Fabiani (ITA)	+0.9	10
3	Sergey Ustiugov (RUS)	+2.0	5
4	Sjur Røthe (NOR)	+2.1	22
5	Calle Halfvarsson (SWE)	+3.2	1
6	Didrik Tønseth (NOR)	+3.6	30
7	Evgeniy Belov (RUS)	+4.4	
8	Andrey Larkov (RUS)	+5.5	3
9	Johannes Høsflot Klæbo (NOR)	+5.6	12
10	Maxim Vylegzhanin (RUS)	+6.8	

Women – 10 km Classic (mass start)
Rank	Name	Time	BS
1	Ingvild Flugstad Østberg (NOR)	32:08.9	30
2	Natalya Nepryayeva (RUS)	+0.1	20
3	Anastasia Sedova (RUS)	+5.3	10
4	Astrid Uhrenholdt Jacobsen (NOR)	+12.9	8
5	Krista Pärmäkoski (FIN)	+15.9	12
6	Yuliya Belorukova (RUS)	+16.2	6
7	Teresa Stadlober (AUT)	+20.6	3
8	Heidi Weng (NOR)	+23.6	4
9	Katharina Hennig (GER)	+56.5	2
10	Stina Nilsson (SWE)	+56.6	

==== Stage 4 bonus seconds ====
- Men: 2 intermediate sprints, bonus seconds to the 10 first skiers (15–12–10–8–6–5–4–3–2–1) past the intermediate points.
- Ladies: 1 intermediate sprint, bonus seconds to the 10 first skiers (15–12–10–8–6–5–4–3–2–1) past the intermediate point.
- Bonus seconds in finish: 15–10–5 to the 3 first skiers crossing the finish line.

Bonus seconds (Stage 4 – Men)
Name	Point 1	Point 2	Finish	Total
Didrik Tønseth (NOR)	15	15	–	30
Sjur Røthe (NOR)	12	10	–	22
Emil Iversen (NOR)	–	6	15	21
Simen Hegstad Krüger (NOR)	6	12	–	18
Johannes Høsflot Klæbo (NOR)	8	4	–	12
Martin Johnsrud Sundby (NOR)	4	8	–	12
Hans Christer Holund (NOR)	10	1	–	11
Alex Harvey (CAN)	5	5	–	10
Francesco De Fabiani (ITA)	–	–	10	10
Sergey Ustiugov (RUS)	–	–	5	5
Alexander Bolshunov (RUS)	2	2	–	4
Andrey Larkov (RUS)	–	3	–	3
Jean-Marc Gaillard (FRA)	3	–	–	3
Calle Halfvarsson (SWE)	1	–	–	1

Bonus seconds (Stage 4 – Women)
Name	Point 1	Finish	Total
Ingvild Flugstad Østberg (NOR)	15	15	30
Natalya Nepryayeva (RUS)	10	10	20
Krista Pärmäkoski (FIN)	12	–	12
Anastasia Sedova (RUS)	5	5	10
Astrid Uhrenholdt Jacobsen (NOR)	8	–	8
Yuliya Belorukova (RUS)	6	–	6
Heidi Weng (NOR)	4	–	4
Teresa Stadlober (AUT)	3	–	3
Katharina Hennig (GER)	2	–	2
Jessie Diggins (USA)	1	–	1

=== Stage 5 ===
3 January 2019, Oberstdorf, Germany

- Bonus seconds in finish: 15–10–5 to the 3 first skiers crossing the finish line.

Men – 15 km Freestyle (pursuit)
Rank	Name	Time	BS
1	Johannes Høsflot Klæbo (NOR)	35:07.5	15
2	Sergey Ustiugov (RUS)	+0.4	10
3	Alexander Bolshunov (RUS)	+1:08.2	5
4	Sindre Bjørnestad Skar (NOR)	+1:41.5	
5	Simen Hegstad Krüger (NOR)	+1:42.4	
6	Francesco De Fabiani (ITA)	+1:56.9	
7	Calle Halfvarsson (SWE)	+1:57.4	
8	Finn Hågen Krogh (NOR)	+1:58.3	
9	Andrey Melnichenko (RUS)	+1.59.2	
10	Clément Parisse (FRA)	+2:00.2	

Women – 10 km Freestyle (pursuit)
Rank	Name	Time	BS
1	Ingvild Flugstad Østberg (NOR)	26:48.1	15
2	Natalya Nepryayeva (RUS)	+30.4	10
3	Jessie Diggins (USA)	+1:12.6	5
4	Yuliya Belorukova (RUS)	+1:12.7	
5	Krista Pärmäkoski (FIN)	+1:23.6	
6	Anastasia Sedova (RUS)	+2:18.8	
7	Heidi Weng (NOR)	+3:00.7	
8	Kari Øyre Slind (NOR)	+3:36.1	
9	Teresa Stadlober (AUT)	+3:36.6	
10	Lotta Udnes Weng (NOR)	+3:49.7	

=== Stage 6 ===
5 January 2019, Val di Fiemme, Italy

Men – 15 km Classic (mass start)
Rank	Name	Time	BS
1	Johannes Høsflot Klæbo (NOR)	40:52.6	45
2	Francesco De Fabiani (ITA)	+0.6	17
3	Alexander Bolshunov (RUS)	+2.6	22
4	Andrey Larkov (RUS)	+3.4	4
5	Maxim Vylegzhanin (RUS)	+4.6	1
6	Andrey Sobakarev (RUS)	+6.3	8
7	Hans Christer Holund (NOR)	+13.0	
8	Denis Spitsov (RUS)	+27.1	
9	Andrew Musgrave (GBR)	+29.0	
10	Martin Johnsrud Sundby (NOR)	+29.9	4

Women – 10 km Classic (mass start)
Rank	Name	Time	BS
1	Ingvild Flugstad Østberg (NOR)	29:34.4	30
2	Natalya Nepryayeva (RUS)	+10.0	22
3	Anastasia Sedova (RUS)	+10.8	11
4	Krista Pärmäkoski (FIN)	+12.5	8
5	Yuliya Belorukova (RUS)	+39.7	10
6	Heidi Weng (NOR)	+1:10.0	5
7	Jessie Diggins (USA)	+1:19.3	6
8	Anamarija Lampič (SLO)	+1.36.8	1
9	Moa Molander Kristiansen (SWE)	+1:36.9	
10	Laura Mononen (FIN)	+1:36.9	

==== Stage 6 bonus seconds ====
- Men: 2 intermediate sprints, bonus seconds to the 10 first skiers (15–12–10–8–6–5–4–3–2–1) past the intermediate points.
- Ladies: 1 intermediate sprint, bonus seconds to the 10 first skiers (15–12–10–8–6–5–4–3–2–1) past the intermediate point.
- Bonus seconds in finish: 15–10–5 to the 3 first skiers crossing the finish line.

Bonus seconds (Stage 6 – Men)
Name	Point 1	Point 2	Finish	Total
Johannes Høsflot Klæbo (NOR)	15	15	15	45
Alexander Bolshunov (RUS)	5	12	5	22
Francesco De Fabiani (ITA)	1	6	10	17
Sergey Ustiugov (RUS)	12	–	–	12
Calle Halfvarsson (SWE)	10	2	–	12
Sjur Røthe (NOR)	2	10	–	12
Dario Cologna (SUI)	8	–	–	8
Simen Hegstad Krüger (NOR)	3	5	–	8
Andrey Sobakarev (RUS)	–	8	–	8
Didrik Tønseth (NOR)	6	–	–	6
Martin Johnsrud Sundby (NOR)	4	–	–	4
Andrey Larkov (RUS)	–	4	–	4
Andrey Melnichenko (RUS)	–	3	–	3
Maxim Vylegzhanin (RUS)	–	1	–	1

Bonus seconds (Stage 6 – Women)
Name	Point 1	Finish	Total
Ingvild Flugstad Østberg (NOR)	15	15	30
Natalya Nepryayeva (RUS)	12	10	22
Anastasia Sedova (RUS)	6	5	11
Krista Pärmäkoski (FIN)	8	–	8
Heidi Weng (NOR)	5	–	5
Jessie Diggins (USA)	4	–	4
Tiril Udnes Weng (NOR)	3	–	3
Lotta Udnes Weng (NOR)	2	–	2
Anouk Faivre-Picon (FRA)	1	–	1

=== Stage 7 ===
6 January 2019, Val di Fiemme, Italy

The race for "Fastest of the Day" counts for 2018–19 FIS Cross-Country World Cup points. No bonus seconds were awarded on this stage.

Men – 9 km Final Climb Freestyle (pursuit)
Rank	Name	Time
1	Sjur Røthe (NOR)	30:32.0
2	Simen Hegstad Krüger (NOR)	+1.3
3	Andrey Melnichenko (RUS)	+28.6
4	Jules Lapierre (FRA)	+29.8
5	Florian Notz (GER)	+45.8
6	Hans Christer Holund (NOR)	+51.4
7	Andrey Larkov (RUS)	+53.6
8	Denis Spitsov (RUS)	+56.3
9	Martin Johnsrud Sundby (NOR)	+56.6
10	Irineu Esteve Altimiras (AND)	+1:09.9

Women – 9 km Final Climb Freestyle (pursuit)
Rank	Name	Time
1	Ingvild Flugstad Østberg (NOR)	35:15.0
2	Krista Pärmäkoski (FIN)	+42.8
3	Anastasia Sedova (RUS)	+49.6
4	Anna Nechaevskaya (RUS)	+57.2
5	Laura Mononen (FIN)	+1:10.9
6	Mariya Istomina (RUS)	+1:29.7
7	Nathalie von Siebenthal (SUI)	+1:38.3
8	Lisa Vinsa (SWE)	+1:38.7
9	Masako Ishida (JPN)	+1:46.3
10	Natalya Nepryayeva (RUS)	+1:48.6

== Sources ==
- Rules for the FIS Cross-Country World Cup (PDF). International Ski Federation (FIS). 2018. Archived from the original (PDF) on 26 November 2018.
