= 2019–20 FIS Cross-Country World Cup =

Cross-country skiing competition

Discipline	Men	Women
Overall	(Russia) Alexander Bolshunov (1)	(Norway) Therese Johaug (3)
Distance	(Russia) Alexander Bolshunov (2)	(Norway) Therese Johaug (4)
Sprint	(Norway) Johannes Høsflot Klæbo (4)	(Sweden) Linn Svahn (1)
U-23	(France) Hugo Lapalus (1)	(Sweden) Ebba Andersson (2)
Bonus Ranking	(Norway) Johannes Høsflot Klæbo (2)	(Norway) Therese Johaug (1)
Nations Cup	Norway (32)	Norway (23)
- Nations Cup Overall: Norway (32)

Stage events
Nordic Opening	(Norway) Johannes Høsflot Klæbo (2)	(Norway) Therese Johaug (3)
Tour de Ski	(Russia) Alexander Bolshunov (1)	(Norway) Therese Johaug (3)
Ski Tour 2020	(Norway) Pål Golberg (1)	(Norway) Therese Johaug (1)

Competition
Locations	18 venues	18 venues
Individual	30 events	30 events
Relay/Team	4 events	4 events
Cancelled	5 events	5 events

The 2019–20 FIS Cross-Country World Cup was the 39th official World Cup season in cross-country skiing for men and women. The season began on 29 November 2019 in Ruka, Finland and concluded on 8 March 2020 in Oslo, Norway.

The Sprint Tour, a stage event scheduled in Quebec City and Minneapolis on 14–17 March 2020 was cancelled due to the coronavirus pandemic. The same reason forced the cancellation of World Cup scheduled in Canmore on 20–22 March 2020, including mixed relay.

== Calendar ==
=== Men ===
Key: C – Classic / F – Freestyle
WC	Stage	Date	Place	Discipline	Winner	Second	Third	Yellow bib	Ref.
	1	29 November 2019	(Finland) Ruka	Sprint C	(Norway) Johannes Høsflot Klæbo	(Norway) Pål Golberg	(France) Richard Jouve	(Norway) Johannes Høsflot Klæbo	
	2	30 November 2019	(Finland) Ruka	15 km C	(Finland) Iivo Niskanen	(Norway) Johannes Høsflot Klæbo	(Norway) Emil Iversen	(Norway) Johannes Høsflot Klæbo	
	3	1 December 2019	(Finland) Ruka	15 km F Pursuit	(Norway) Hans Christer Holund	(Norway) Sjur Røthe	(Norway) Emil Iversen	(Norway) Johannes Høsflot Klæbo	
1	10th Nordic Opening Overall (29 November – 1 December 2019)				(Norway) Johannes Høsflot Klæbo	(Norway) Emil Iversen	(Finland) Iivo Niskanen	(Norway) Johannes Høsflot Klæbo	
2	4	7 December 2019	(Norway) Lillehammer	30 km Skiathlon	(Russia) Alexander Bolshunov	(Norway) Hans Christer Holund	(Norway) Emil Iversen	(Norway) Johannes Høsflot Klæbo	
3	5	14 December 2019	(Switzerland) Davos	Sprint F	(Norway) Johannes Høsflot Klæbo	(France) Lucas Chanavat	(Norway) Håvard Solås Taugbøl	(Norway) Johannes Høsflot Klæbo	
4	6	15 December 2019	(Switzerland) Davos	15 km F	(Norway) Simen Hegstad Krüger	(Russia) Sergey Ustiugov	(Switzerland) Dario Cologna	(Norway) Johannes Høsflot Klæbo	
5	7	21 December 2019	(Slovenia) Planica	Sprint F	(France) Lucas Chanavat	(Italy) Federico Pellegrino	(Norway) Erik Valnes	(Norway) Johannes Høsflot Klæbo	
	8	28 December 2019	(Switzerland) Lenzerheide	15 km F Mass Start	(Russia) Sergey Ustiugov	(Norway) Johannes Høsflot Klæbo	(Russia) Alexander Bolshunov	(Norway) Johannes Høsflot Klæbo	
	9	29 December 2019	(Switzerland) Lenzerheide	Sprint F	(Norway) Johannes Høsflot Klæbo	(Italy) Federico Pellegrino	(France) Richard Jouve	(Norway) Johannes Høsflot Klæbo	
	10	31 December 2019	(Italy) Toblach	15 km F	(Russia) Sergey Ustiugov	(Russia) Ivan Yakimushkin	(Russia) Alexander Bolshunov	(Norway) Johannes Høsflot Klæbo	
	11	1 January 2020	(Italy) Toblach	15 km C Pursuit	(Russia) Alexander Bolshunov	(Russia) Sergey Ustiugov	(Finland) Iivo Niskanen	(Norway) Johannes Høsflot Klæbo	
	12	3 January 2020	(Italy) Val di Fiemme	15 km C Mass Start	(Norway) Johannes Høsflot Klæbo	(Russia) Sergey Ustiugov	(Russia) Alexander Bolshunov	(Norway) Johannes Høsflot Klæbo	
	13	4 January 2020	(Italy) Val di Fiemme	Sprint C	(Norway) Johannes Høsflot Klæbo	(Russia) Sergey Ustiugov	(Russia) Alexander Bolshunov	(Norway) Johannes Høsflot Klæbo	
	14	5 January 2020	(Italy) Val di Fiemme	10 km F Mass Start Climb	(Norway) Simen Hegstad Krüger	(Norway) Sjur Røthe	(Russia) Alexander Bolshunov	(Norway) Johannes Høsflot Klæbo	
6	14th Tour de Ski Overall (28 December 2019 – 5 January 2020)				(Russia) Alexander Bolshunov	(Russia) Sergey Ustiugov	(Norway) Johannes Høsflot Klæbo	(Russia) Alexander Bolshunov	
7	15	11 January 2020	(Germany) Dresden	Sprint F	(France) Lucas Chanavat	(Norway) Sindre Bjørnestad Skar	(Sweden) Johan Häggström	(Russia) Alexander Bolshunov	
8	16	18 January 2020	(Czech Republic) Nové Město	15 km F	(Russia) Alexander Bolshunov	(Finland) Iivo Niskanen	(Norway) Sjur Røthe	(Russia) Alexander Bolshunov	
9	17	19 January 2020	(Czech Republic) Nové Město	15 km C Pursuit	(Russia) Alexander Bolshunov	(Norway) Johannes Høsflot Klæbo	(Norway) Simen Hegstad Krüger	(Russia) Alexander Bolshunov	
10	18	25 January 2020	(Germany) Oberstdorf	30 km Skiathlon	(Russia) Alexander Bolshunov	(Norway) Simen Hegstad Krüger	(Norway) Sjur Røthe	(Russia) Alexander Bolshunov	
11	19	26 January 2020	(Germany) Oberstdorf	Sprint C	(Norway) Johannes Høsflot Klæbo	(Norway) Pål Golberg	(Norway) Erik Valnes	(Russia) Alexander Bolshunov	
12	20	8 February 2020	(Sweden) Falun	Sprint C	(Norway) Pål Golberg	(Norway) Erik Valnes	(Russia) Alexander Bolshunov	(Russia) Alexander Bolshunov	
13	21	9 February 2020	(Sweden) Falun	15 km F Mass Start	(Russia) Alexander Bolshunov	(Norway) Sjur Røthe	(Russia) Ivan Yakimushkin	(Russia) Alexander Bolshunov	
	22	15 February 2020	(Sweden) Östersund	15 km F	(Norway) Sjur Røthe	(Norway) Simen Hegstad Krüger	(Norway) Finn Hågen Krogh	(Russia) Alexander Bolshunov	
	23	16 February 2020	(Sweden) Östersund	15 km C Pursuit	(Norway) Pål Golberg	(Russia) Alexander Bolshunov	(Norway) Martin Løwstrøm Nyenget	(Russia) Alexander Bolshunov	
	24	18 February 2020	(Sweden) Åre	Sprint F	(Norway) Johannes Høsflot Klæbo	(Italy) Federico Pellegrino	(France) Renaud Jay	(Russia) Alexander Bolshunov	
	25	20 February 2020	(Norway) Meråker	34 km F Mass Start	(Russia) Alexander Bolshunov	(Norway) Johannes Høsflot Klæbo	(Norway) Emil Iversen	(Russia) Alexander Bolshunov	
	26	22 February 2020	(Norway) Trondheim	Sprint C	(Norway) Johannes Høsflot Klæbo	(Norway) Pål Golberg	(Norway) Erik Valnes	(Russia) Alexander Bolshunov	
	27	23 February 2020	(Norway) Trondheim	30 km C Pursuit	(Norway) Emil Iversen	(Finland) Iivo Niskanen	(Norway) Hans Christer Holund	(Russia) Alexander Bolshunov	
14	FIS Ski Tour 2020 Overall (15 – 23 February 2020)				(Norway) Pål Golberg	(Norway) Simen Hegstad Krüger	(Norway) Hans Christer Holund	(Russia) Alexander Bolshunov	
15	28	29 February 2020	(Finland) Lahti	15 km C	(Finland) Iivo Niskanen	(Russia) Alexander Bolshunov	(Norway) Hans Christer Holund	(Russia) Alexander Bolshunov	
16	29	4 March 2020	(Norway) Konnerud (Note: Rescheduled from Sprint C in Drammen due to lack of snow.)	Sprint F	(Norway) Johannes Høsflot Klæbo	(Norway) Håvard Solås Taugbøl	(Norway) Eirik Brandsdal	(Russia) Alexander Bolshunov	
17	30	8 March 2020	(Norway) Oslo	50 km C Mass Start	(Russia) Alexander Bolshunov	(Norway) Simen Hegstad Krüger	(Norway) Emil Iversen	(Russia) Alexander Bolshunov	
		14 March 2020	(Canada) Quebec City	Sprint C	Cancelled due to the coronavirus pandemic				
		15 March 2020	(Canada) Quebec City	Sprint F	Cancelled due to the coronavirus pandemic				
		17 March 2020	(United States) Minneapolis	Sprint F	Cancelled due to the coronavirus pandemic				
	1st Sprint Tour Overall (14 – 17 March 2020)				Cancelled due to the coronavirus pandemic				
		20 March 2020	(Canada) Canmore	15 km F Mass Start	Cancelled due to the coronavirus pandemic				
		21 March 2020	(Canada) Canmore	15 km C Pursuit	Cancelled due to the coronavirus pandemic				

=== Women ===
Key: C – Classic / F – Freestyle
WC	Stage	Date	Place	Discipline	Winner	Second	Third	Yellow bib	Ref.
	1	29 November 2019	(Finland) Ruka	Sprint C	(Norway) Maiken Caspersen Falla	(Sweden) Jonna Sundling	(United States) Sadie Maubet Bjornsen	(Norway) Maiken Caspersen Falla	
	2	30 November 2019	(Finland) Ruka	10 km C	(Norway) Therese Johaug	(Finland) Krista Pärmäkoski	(Russia) Natalya Nepryayeva	(United States) Sadie Maubet Bjornsen	
	3	1 December 2019	(Finland) Ruka	10 km F Pursuit	(Norway) Therese Johaug	(Norway) Heidi Weng	(United States) Jessie Diggins	(Norway) Therese Johaug	
1	10th Nordic Opening Overall (29 November – 1 December 2019)				(Norway) Therese Johaug	(Norway) Heidi Weng	(Norway) Astrid Uhrenholdt Jacobsen	(Norway) Therese Johaug	
2	4	7 December 2019	(Norway) Lillehammer	15 km Skiathlon	(Norway) Therese Johaug	(United States) Jessie Diggins	(Norway) Heidi Weng	(Norway) Therese Johaug	
3	5	14 December 2019	(Switzerland) Davos	Sprint F	(Sweden) Linn Svahn	(Norway) Maiken Caspersen Falla	(United States) Sophie Caldwell	(Norway) Therese Johaug	
4	6	15 December 2019	(Switzerland) Davos	10 km F	(Norway) Therese Johaug	(Norway) Heidi Weng	(United States) Jessie Diggins	(Norway) Therese Johaug	
5	7	21 December 2019	(Slovenia) Planica	Sprint F	(Sweden) Jonna Sundling	(Sweden) Stina Nilsson	(United States) Julia Kern	(Norway) Therese Johaug	
	8	28 December 2019	(Switzerland) Lenzerheide	10 km F Mass Start	(Norway) Therese Johaug	(Norway) Heidi Weng	(Sweden) Ebba Andersson	(Norway) Therese Johaug	
	9	29 December 2019	(Switzerland) Lenzerheide	Sprint F	(Slovenia) Anamarija Lampič	(Norway) Maiken Caspersen Falla	(Russia) Natalya Nepryayeva	(Norway) Therese Johaug	
	10	31 December 2019	(Italy) Toblach	10 km F	(Norway) Therese Johaug	(Norway) Ingvild Flugstad Østberg	(Sweden) Ebba Andersson	(Norway) Therese Johaug	
	11	1 January 2020	(Italy) Toblach	10 km C Pursuit	(Norway) Ingvild Flugstad Østberg	(Norway) Therese Johaug	(Norway) Heidi Weng	(Norway) Therese Johaug	
	12	3 January 2020	(Italy) Val di Fiemme	10 km C Mass Start	(Norway) Astrid Uhrenholdt Jacobsen	(Sweden) Ebba Andersson	(Germany) Katharina Hennig	(Norway) Therese Johaug	
	13	4 January 2020	(Italy) Val di Fiemme	Sprint C	(Slovenia) Anamarija Lampič	(Norway) Astrid Uhrenholdt Jacobsen	(United States) Jessie Diggins	(Norway) Therese Johaug	
	14	5 January 2020	(Italy) Val di Fiemme	10 km F Mass Start Climb	(Norway) Therese Johaug	(Norway) Heidi Weng	(Norway) Ingvild Flugstad Østberg	(Norway) Therese Johaug	
6	14th Tour de Ski Overall (28 December 2019 – 5 January 2020)				(Norway) Therese Johaug	(Russia) Natalya Nepryayeva	(Norway) Ingvild Flugstad Østberg	(Norway) Therese Johaug	
7	15	11 January 2020	(Germany) Dresden	Sprint F	(Sweden) Linn Svahn	(Slovenia) Anamarija Lampič	(Sweden) Maja Dahlqvist	(Norway) Therese Johaug	
8	16	18 January 2020	(Czech Republic) Nové Město	10 km F	(Norway) Therese Johaug	(Russia) Natalya Nepryayeva	(Norway) Heidi Weng	(Norway) Therese Johaug	
9	17	19 January 2020	(Czech Republic) Nové Město	10 km C Pursuit	(Norway) Therese Johaug	(Russia) Natalya Nepryayeva	(Norway) Ingvild Flugstad Østberg	(Norway) Therese Johaug	
10	18	25 January 2020	(Germany) Oberstdorf	15 km Skiathlon	(Norway) Therese Johaug	(Norway) Ingvild Flugstad Østberg	(Austria) Teresa Stadlober	(Norway) Therese Johaug	
11	19	26 January 2020	(Germany) Oberstdorf	Sprint C	(Russia) Natalya Nepryayeva	(Slovenia) Anamarija Lampič	(United States) Jessie Diggins	(Norway) Therese Johaug	
12	20	8 February 2020	(Sweden) Falun	Sprint C	(Sweden) Linn Svahn	(Russia) Natalya Nepryayeva	(Sweden) Jonna Sundling	(Norway) Therese Johaug	
13	21	9 February 2020	(Sweden) Falun	10 km F Mass Start	(Norway) Therese Johaug	(Sweden) Ebba Andersson	(Norway) Heidi Weng	(Norway) Therese Johaug	
	22	15 February 2020	(Sweden) Östersund	10 km F	(Norway) Therese Johaug	(Norway) Heidi Weng	(Norway) Ingvild Flugstad Østberg	(Norway) Therese Johaug	
	23	16 February 2020	(Sweden) Östersund	10 km C Pursuit	(Norway) Therese Johaug	(Norway) Heidi Weng	(Norway) Ingvild Flugstad Østberg	(Norway) Therese Johaug	
	24	18 February 2020	(Sweden) Åre	Sprint F	(Norway) Therese Johaug	(Norway) Heidi Weng	(Norway) Astrid Uhrenholdt Jacobsen	(Norway) Therese Johaug	
	25	20 February 2020	(Norway) Meråker	34 km F Mass Start	(Norway) Therese Johaug	(Norway) Ingvild Flugstad Østberg	(Norway) Heidi Weng	(Norway) Therese Johaug	
	26	22 February 2020	(Norway) Trondheim	Sprint C	(Norway) Maiken Caspersen Falla	(Sweden) Jonna Sundling	(Switzerland) Nadine Fähndrich	(Norway) Therese Johaug	
	27	23 February 2020	(Norway) Trondheim	15 km C Pursuit	(Norway) Therese Johaug	(Norway) Astrid Uhrenholdt Jacobsen	(Finland) Krista Pärmäkoski	(Norway) Therese Johaug	
14	FIS Ski Tour 2020 Overall (15 – 23 February 2020)				(Norway) Therese Johaug	(Norway) Heidi Weng	(Norway) Ingvild Flugstad Østberg	(Norway) Therese Johaug	
15	28	29 February 2020	(Finland) Lahti	10 km C	(Norway) Therese Johaug	(Sweden) Ebba Andersson	(Finland) Krista Pärmäkoski	(Norway) Therese Johaug	
16	29	4 March 2020	(Norway) Konnerud	Sprint F	(Sweden) Jonna Sundling	(Switzerland) Nadine Fähndrich	(Sweden) Linn Svahn	(Norway) Therese Johaug	
17	30	7 March 2020	(Norway) Oslo	30 km C Mass Start	(Sweden) Frida Karlsson	(Norway) Therese Johaug	(Sweden) Ebba Andersson	(Norway) Therese Johaug	
		14 March 2020	(Canada) Quebec City	Sprint C	Cancelled due to the coronavirus pandemic				
		15 March 2020	(Canada) Quebec City	Sprint F	Cancelled due to the coronavirus pandemic				
		17 March 2020	(United States) Minneapolis	Sprint F	Cancelled due to the coronavirus pandemic				
	1st Sprint Tour Overall (14 – 17 March 2020)				Cancelled due to the coronavirus pandemic				
		20 March 2020	(Canada) Canmore	10 km F Mass Start	Cancelled due to the coronavirus pandemic				
		21 March 2020	(Canada) Canmore	10 km C Pursuit	Cancelled due to the coronavirus pandemic				

=== Men's team ===
WC	Date	Place	Discipline	Winner	Second	Third	Ref.
1	8 December 2019	(Norway) Lillehammer	4 × 7.5 km relay C/F	Russia II Ivan Yakimushkin; Evgeniy Belov; Ilia Poroshkin; Sergey Ustiugov	Russia I Andrey Larkov; Ilia Semikov; Denis Spitsov; Andrey Melnichenko	Norway I Pål Golberg; Hans Christer Holund; Sjur Røthe; Finn Hågen Krogh	
2	22 December 2019	(Slovenia) Planica	Team Sprint F	Norway I Sindre Bjørnestad Skar; Erik Valnes	Norway II Gjøran Tefre; Håvard Solås Taugbøl	Finland I Ristomatti Hakola; Joni Mäki	
3	12 January 2020	(Germany) Dresden	Team Sprint F	France I Renaud Jay; Lucas Chanavat	Sweden I Marcus Grate; Johan Häggström	Russia I Andrey Krasnov; Gleb Retivykh	
4	1 March 2020	(Finland) Lahti	4 × 7.5 km relay C/F	Norway Pål Golberg; Hans Christer Holund; Sjur Røthe; Johannes Høsflot Klæbo	Switzerland Beda Klee; Dario Cologna; Jason Rüesch; Roman Furger	Russia I Ilia Semikov; Alexander Bessmertnykh; Denis Spitsov; Andrey Melnichenko	

=== Women's team ===
WC	Date	Place	Discipline	Winner	Second	Third	Ref.
1	8 December 2019	(Norway) Lillehammer	4 × 5 km relay C/F	Norway I Maiken Caspersen Falla; Astrid Uhrenholdt Jacobsen; Therese Johaug; Heidi Weng	United States I Sophie Caldwell; Sadie Maubet Bjornsen; Rosie Brennan; Jessie Diggins	Sweden Emma Ribom; Elina Rönnlund; Charlotte Kalla; Moa Lundgren	
2	22 December 2019	(Slovenia) Planica	Team Sprint F	Sweden II Maja Dahlqvist; Linn Svahn	Sweden I Stina Nilsson; Jonna Sundling	Switzerland Laurien van der Graaff; Nadine Fähndrich	
3	12 January 2020	(Germany) Dresden	Team Sprint F	Sweden I Maja Dahlqvist; Linn Svahn	Switzerland Laurien van der Graaff; Nadine Fähndrich	Sweden II Evelina Settlin; Linn Sömskar	
4	1 March 2020	(Finland) Lahti	4 × 5 km relay C/F	Norway Tiril Udnes Weng; Ingvild Flugstad Østberg; Therese Johaug; Heidi Weng	Finland I Johanna Matintalo; Kerttu Niskanen; Laura Mononen; Krista Pärmäkoski	Sweden Charlotte Kalla; Frida Karlsson; Rebecca Öhrn; Maja Dahlqvist	

=== Mixed team ===
WC	Date	Place	Discipline	Winner	Second	Third	Ref.
	22 March 2020	(Canada) Canmore	4 × 5 km relay C/F	Cancelled due to the coronavirus pandemic			

== Men's standings ==
=== Overall ===
Rank	after all 33 events	Points
	(Russia) Alexander Bolshunov	2221
2	(Norway) Johannes Høsflot Klæbo	1726
3	(Norway) Pål Golberg	1311
4	(Norway) Simen Hegstad Krüger	1260
5	(Norway) Sjur Røthe	1257
6	(Finland) Iivo Niskanen	1221
7	(Norway) Hans Christer Holund	954
8	(Russia) Sergey Ustiugov	908
9	(Norway) Emil Iversen	875
10	(Switzerland) Dario Cologna	649

=== Distance ===
Rank	after all 19 events	Points
	(Russia) Alexander Bolshunov	1293
2	(Norway) Sjur Røthe	864
3	(Finland) Iivo Niskanen	840
4	(Norway) Simen Hegstad Krüger	776
5	(Norway) Hans Christer Holund	694
6	(Norway) Johannes Høsflot Klæbo	616
7	(Norway) Emil Iversen	443
8	(Russia) Sergey Ustiugov	435
9	(Switzerland) Dario Cologna	425
10	(Norway) Pål Golberg	365

=== Sprint ===
Rank	after all 11 events	Points
	(Norway) Johannes Høsflot Klæbo	550
2	(Norway) Erik Valnes	405
3	(Norway) Pål Golberg	386
4	(Italy) Federico Pellegrino	385
5	(France) Lucas Chanavat	373
6	(Russia) Alexander Bolshunov	330
7	(Russia) Gleb Retivykh	325
8	(Norway) Håvard Solås Taugbøl	294
9	(Sweden) Johan Häggström	268
10	(Norway) Sindre Bjørnestad Skar	261

=== Prize money ===
Rank	after all 51 payouts	CHF
1	(Russia) Alexander Bolshunov	204.820
2	(Norway) Johannes Høsflot Klæbo	171.960
3	(Norway) Pål Golberg	120.100
4	(Norway) Simen Hegstad Krüger	102.490
5	(Norway) Sjur Røthe	78.240
6	(Russia) Sergey Ustiugov	69.900
7	(Finland) Iivo Niskanen	63.880
8	(Norway) Hans Christer Holund	59.500
9	(Norway) Emil Iversen	58.100
10	(France) Lucas Chanavat	36.100

=== U23 ===
Rank	after all 33 events	Points
1	(France) Hugo Lapalus	106
2	(Russia) Alexander Terentyev	59
3	(Finland) Verneri Suhonen	28
4	(Russia) Sergey Ardashev	24
5	(Czech Republic) Jan Pechoušek	21
6	(France) Jules Chappaz	21
7	(Italy) Simone Daprá	11
8	(Italy) Davide Graz	9
9	(Norway) Harald Østberg Amundsen	8
10	(Germany) Richard Leupold	6

=== Bonus Ranking ===
Rank	after all 11 events	Points
1	(Norway) Johannes Høsflot Klæbo	381
2	(Russia) Alexander Bolshunov	332
3	(Norway) Pål Golberg	276
4	(Finland) Iivo Niskanen	199
5	(Norway) Sjur Røthe	179
6	(Italy) Federico Pellegrino	162
7	(Norway) Simen Hegstad Krüger	150
8	(Norway) Emil Iversen	145
9	(Norway) Erik Valnes	127
10	(Russia) Gleb Retivykh	127

== Women's standings ==
=== Overall ===
Rank	after all 33 events	Points
	(Norway) Therese Johaug	2508
2	(Norway) Heidi Weng	1697
3	(Russia) Natalya Nepryayeva	1356
4	(Norway) Astrid Uhrenholdt Jacobsen	1289
5	(Norway) Ingvild Flugstad Østberg	1110
6	(United States) Jessie Diggins	1078
7	(Sweden) Ebba Andersson	891
8	(United States) Sadie Maubet Bjornsen	855
9	(Finland) Krista Pärmäkoski	829
10	(Austria) Teresa Stadlober	793

=== Distance ===
Rank	after all 19 events	Points
	(Norway) Therese Johaug	1451
2	(Norway) Heidi Weng	920
3	(Sweden) Ebba Andersson	717
4	(Russia) Natalya Nepryayeva	652
5	(Norway) Ingvild Flugstad Østberg	644
6	(Norway) Astrid Uhrenholdt Jacobsen	622
7	(Finland) Krista Pärmäkoski	561
8	(United States) Jessie Diggins	534
9	(Austria) Teresa Stadlober	520
10	(Sweden) Charlotte Kalla	477

=== Sprint ===
Rank	after all 11 events	Points
	(Sweden) Linn Svahn	509
2	(Sweden) Jonna Sundling	486
3	(Slovenia) Anamarija Lampič	472
4	(Russia) Natalya Nepryayeva	358
5	(Norway) Maiken Caspersen Falla	351
6	(United States) Sophie Caldwell	338
7	(Switzerland) Nadine Fähndrich	318
8	(Norway) Astrid Uhrenholdt Jacobsen	232
9	(Sweden) Maja Dahlqvist	220
10	(United States) Sadie Maubet Bjornsen	219

=== Prize money ===
Rank	after all 51 payouts	CHF
1	(Norway) Therese Johaug	297.700
2	(Norway) Heidi Weng	152.990
3	(Russia) Natalya Nepryayeva	109.150
4	(Norway) Ingvild Flugstad Østberg	88.650
5	(Norway) Astrid Uhrenholdt Jacobsen	75.200
6	(United States) Jessie Diggins	56.460
7	(Sweden) Linn Svahn	52.000
8	(Sweden) Ebba Andersson	49.800
9	(Sweden) Jonna Sundling	40.940
10	(Finland) Krista Pärmäkoski	40.870

=== U23 ===
Rank	after all 33 events	Points
1	(Sweden) Ebba Andersson	891
2	(Sweden) Linn Svahn	559
3	(Sweden) Frida Karlsson	376
4	(Sweden) Emma Ribom	373
5	(Sweden) Moa Lundgren	266
6	(United States) Julia Kern	150
7	(Czech Republic) Kateřina Janatová	119
8	(Italy) Anna Comarella	117
9	(Sweden) Johanna Hagström	78
10	(Norway) Helene Marie Fossesholm	61

=== Bonus Ranking ===
Rank	after all 11 events	Points
1	(Norway) Therese Johaug	292
2	(Norway) Heidi Weng	232
3	(Norway) Astrid Uhrenholdt Jacobsen	225
4	(Sweden) Jonna Sundling	180
5	(Norway) Maiken Caspersen Falla	172
6	(United States) Jessie Diggins	168
7	(Slovenia) Anamarija Lampič	152
8	(United States) Sadie Maubet Bjornsen	138
9	(Russia) Natalya Nepryayeva	126
10	(Norway) Tiril Udnes Weng	112

== Nations Cup ==
=== Overall ===
Rank	after all 74 events	Points
1	Norway	14521
2	Russia	7542
3	Sweden	6916
4	Finland	4781
5	United States	3612
6	Switzerland	2488
7	France	2428
8	Germany	1995
9	Italy	1666
10	Slovenia	1261

=== Men ===
Rank	after all 37 events	Points
1	Norway	7330
2	Russia	5364
3	Finland	2360
4	Sweden	2222
5	France	2033
6	Switzerland	1488
7	Italy	1185
8	Germany	763
9	Great Britain	401
10	United States	384

=== Women ===
Rank	after all 37 events	Points
1	Norway	7191
2	Sweden	4694
3	United States	3228
4	Finland	2421
5	Russia	2178
6	Germany	1232
7	Slovenia	1051
8	Switzerland	1000
9	Austria	804
10	Czech Republic	615

== Points distribution ==
The table shows the number of points won in the 2019/20 Cross-Country Skiing World Cup for men and women. Team Sprint and Relay points are included only in Nations Cup, don't impact on individual rankings.

Place	1	2	3	4	5	6	7	8	9	10	11	12	13	14	15	16	17	18	19	20	21	22	23	24	25	26	27	28	29	30	31 - 40	>40
Individual	100	80	60	50	45	40	36	32	29	26	24	22	20	18	16	15	14	13	12	11	10	9	8	7	6	5	4	3	2	1
Team Sprint	100	80	60	50	45	40	36	32	29	26	24	22	20	18	16	15	14	13	12	11	10	9	8	7	6	5	4	3	2	1
Nordic Opening	200	160	120	100	90	80	72	64	58	52	48	44	40	36	32	30	28	26	24	22	20	18	16	14	12	10	8	6	4	2
Relay	200	160	120	100	90	80	72	64	58	52	48	44	40	36	32	30	28	26	24	22	20	18	16	14	12	10	8	6	4	2
Tour de Ski	400	320	240	200	180	160	144	128	116	104	96	88	80	72	64	60	56	52	48	44	40	36	32	28	24	20	20	20	20	20	10	5
Ski Tour	300	240	180	150	135	120	108	96	87	78	72	66	60	54	48	45	42	39	36	33	30	27	24	21	18	15	12	9	6	3
Stage Nordic Opening	50	46	43	40	37	34	32	30	28	26	24	22	20	18	16	15	14	13	12	11	10	9	8	7	6	5	4	3	2	1
Stage Tour de Ski	50	46	43	40	37	34	32	30	28	26	24	22	20	18	16	15	14	13	12	11	10	9	8	7	6	5	4	3	2	1
Stage Ski Tour	50	46	43	40	37	34	32	30	28	26	24	22	20	18	16	15	14	13	12	11	10	9	8	7	6	5	4	3	2	1
Bonus points	15	12	10	8	6	5	4	3	2	1

== Achievements ==
Only individual events.

First World Cup career victory

Men

- (Norway) Hans Christer Holund, 30, in his 9th season – the WC 1 (15 km F Pursuit) in Ruka; first podium was 2014–15 WC 4 (30 km Skiathlon) in Lillehammer
- (France) Lucas Chanavat, 25, in his 5th season – the WC 5 (Sprint F) in Planica; first podium was 2017–18 WC 8 (Sprint F) in Lenzerheide

Women

- (Sweden) Linn Svahn, 20, in her 2nd season – the WC 3 (Sprint F) in Davos; also first podium
- (Sweden) Frida Karlsson, 20, in her 2nd season – the WC 17 (30 km C Mass Start) in Oslo; also first podium

First World Cup podium

Men

- (Norway) Håvard Solås Taugbøl, 26, in his 7th season – no. 3 in the WC 3 (Sprint F) in Davos
- (Russia) Ivan Yakimushkin, 23, in his 3rd season – no. 2 in the WC 6 (15 km F) in Toblach
- (Sweden) Johan Häggström, 27, in his 4th season – no. 3 in the WC 7 (Sprint F) in Dresden
- (Norway) Martin Løwstrøm Nyenget, 27, in his 7th season – no. 3 in the WC 14 (15 km C Pursuit) in Östersund
- (France) Renaud Jay, 28, in his 9th season – no. 3 in the WC 14 (Sprint F) in Åre

Women

- (Sweden) Linn Svahn, 20, in her 2nd season – no. 1 in the WC 3 (Sprint F) in Davos
- (United States) Julia Kern, 22, in her 4th season – no. 3 in the WC 5 (Sprint F) in Planica
- (Germany) Katharina Hennig, 23, in her 5th season – no. 3 in the WC 6 (10 km C Mass Start) in Val di Fiemme
- (Sweden) Frida Karlsson, 20, in her 2nd season – no. 1 in the WC 17 (30 km C Mass Start) in Oslo

Victories in this World Cup (all-time number of victories in parentheses)

Men

- (Norway) Johannes Høsflot Klæbo, 10 (37) first places
- (Russia) Alexander Bolshunov, 9 (17) first places
- (Norway) Pål Golberg, 3 (7) first places
- (Russia) Sergey Ustiugov, 2 (15) first places
- (Finland) Iivo Niskanen, 2 (5) first places
- (Norway) Simen Hegstad Krüger, 2 (3) first places
- (France) Lucas Chanavat, 2 (2) first places
- (Norway) Emil Iversen, 1 (7) first place
- (Norway) Sjur Røthe, 1 (5) first place
- (Norway) Hans Christer Holund, 1 (1) first place

Women

- (Norway) Therese Johaug, 20 (73) first places
- (Sweden) Linn Svahn, 3 (3) first places
- (Norway) Maiken Caspersen Falla, 2 (21) first places
- (Slovenia) Anamarija Lampič, 2 (3) first places
- (Sweden) Jonna Sundling, 2 (3) first places
- (Norway) Ingvild Flugstad Østberg, 1 (17) first place
- (Norway) Astrid Uhrenholdt Jacobsen, 1 (6) first place
- (Russia) Natalya Nepryayeva, 1 (2) first place
- (Sweden) Frida Karlsson, 1 (1) first place

== Retirements ==
The following athletes announced their retirements during or after the season:

Men

- (Sweden) Martin Bergström
- (United States) Erik Bjornsen
- (Norway) Eirik Brandsdal
- (Norway) Sondre Turvoll Fossli
- (Finland) Lari Lehtonen
- (Switzerland) Toni Livers
- (United States) Andrew Newell
- (Sweden) Teodor Peterson
- (Norway) Fredrik Riseth
- (Austria) Bernhard Tritscher
- (Germany) Thomas Wick

Women

- (Slovenia) Vesna Fabjan
- (United States) Elizabeth Guiney
- (Norway) Astrid Uhrenholdt Jacobsen
- (Sweden) Stina Nilsson - Change of sport (Biathlon)
- (Canada) Emily Nishikawa
- (Sweden) Jennie Öberg
- (Slovenia) Katja Višnar
