= List of Tour de Ski men's overall winners =

Men's Overall standings at the Tour de Ski
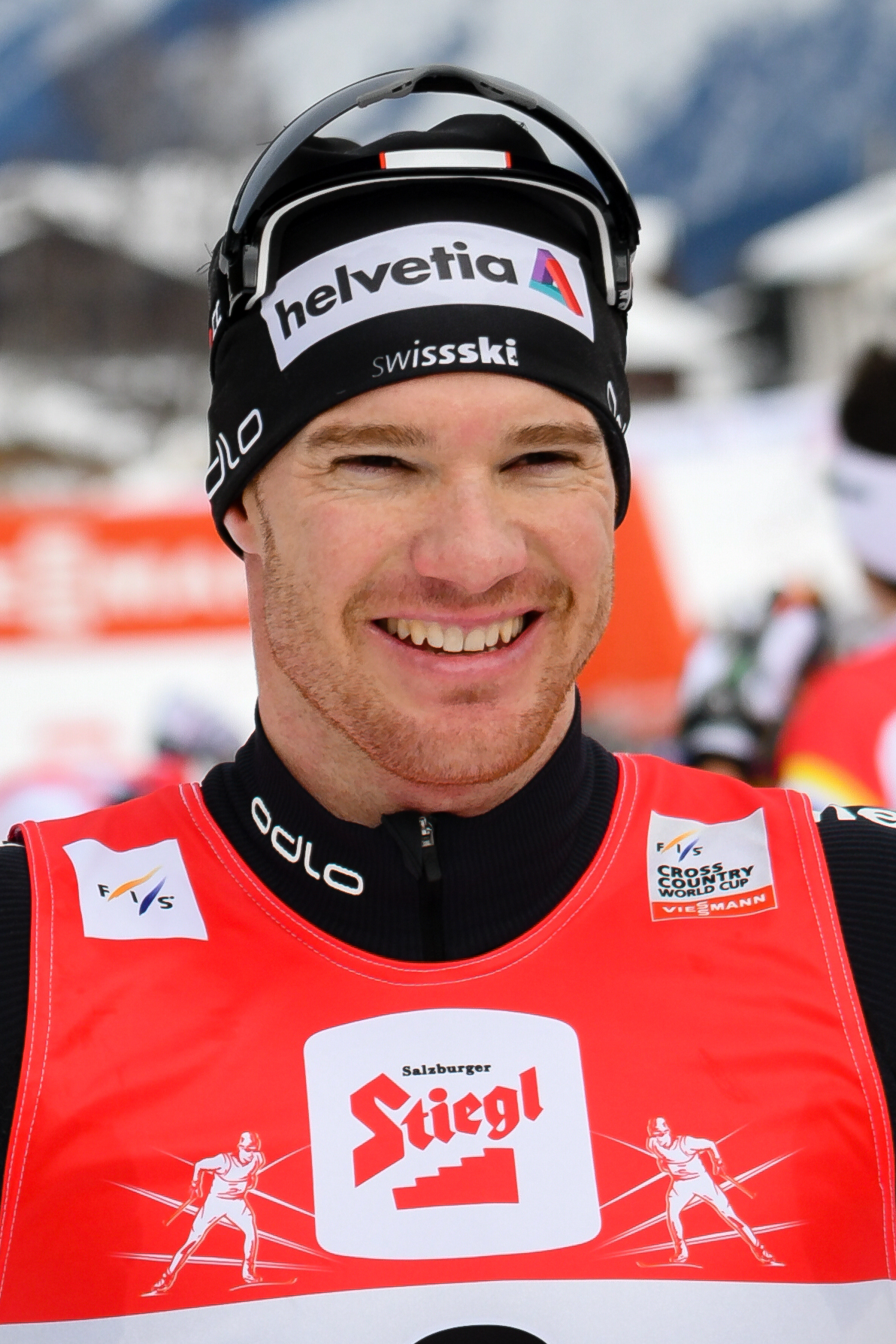
- Dario Cologna, winner of four Tour de Ski titles from 2009 to 2018.
- Location: Finished on the Alpe Cermis, Val di Fiemme, Italy
- Dates: Late December–early January annually

This is a list of the Tour de Ski men's overall winners. The Tour de Ski is an annual cross-country skiing event held annually since the 2006–07 season in Central Europe, modeled on the Tour de France of cycling. The Tour de Ski is a Stage World Cup event in the FIS Cross-Country World Cup. Each Tour de Ski has consisted of six to nine stages, held during late December and early January in the Czech Republic, Germany, Italy, and Switzerland.

The skier with the lowest aggregate time at the end of each day wears the gold bib, representing the leader of the overall standings. There are one other bibs as well: the silver bib, worn by the leader of the point standings and violet bib, worn by the leader of the climbing standings.

Johannes Høsflot Klæbo have won the most Tours with five. Together with Dario Cologna and Alexander Bolshunov have managed to win two consecutive Tours. Klæbo is the youngest winner; he won in 2018–19, 22 years and 76 days old. Lukáš Bauer is the oldest winner, having been 32 years, 145 days old when he won the 2009–10 edition.

Norwegian skiers have won the most Tours with nine; four Norwegian and three Russian skiers have won. The most recent winner is Johannes Høsflot Klæbo of Norway, who won the 2025–26 Tour de Ski, his fifth.

== History ==
The Tour de Ski was established in 2006 by FIS, after ideas emerging on a meeting between former Olympic gold medallist Vegard Ulvang and Jürg Capol, the International Ski Federation's (FIS) chief executive officer for cross-country competitions, in Ulvang's sauna in Maridalen, Norway. Their idea was to create a stage competition consisting of different events which they expected would lead to several days of continuous excitement before the most complete skiers would become Tour de Ski champions. Jürg Capol stated that FIS originally wished to start the race in the Alps. However, as neither Austria or Switzerland were interested, the opening two stages were to be held in Nové Město na Moravě in the Czech Republic. A week before the Tour was due to start, FIS announced that snow conditions in Nové Město were not good enough, and cancelled the two races there. The first Tour de Ski therefore opened with a sprint race in Munich on 31 December 2006, and was won by Christoph Eigenmann (SUI).

Skiers from France, Germany and Norway, among others, said that the Tour de Ski was among their targets for the 2006–07 season, with Norwegian skier Jens Arne Svartedal claiming that the winner would have "extreme respect" for winning such an extreme race. Tobias Angerer (GER) were the first men's overall winners of the Tour. Angerer did not win any of the stages on his path to victory.

After the first Tour de Ski, reactions among athletes were largely positive. Norwegian athletes said "it was a good concept", German winner Tobias Angerer claimed that the Tour de Ski "has a great future", Oberstdorf in Bavaria was originally scheduled to host two stages, but cancelled as the German Ski Association could only arrange a race on 2 January. though many of the athletes expressed concern over the final climb up an alpine skiing hill both before and after the race. The director of FIS' cross-country committee, Vegard Ulvang, said the finish would be in the same place next year, but the way up could be changed. Ulvang also claimed that the Tour had been a success, and a "breakthrough for FIS" Ulvang did, however, admit that there would have to be some changes, as up to a third of participants in the Tour de Ski have struggled with illness or injury after the competition.

Newspaper comments were divided: in Expressen's opinion, the finish was the "most enjoyable competition seen in years," while Roland Wiedemann in Der Spiegel said this "should be the future of cross-country skiing". Critical commentaries appeared in Göteborgs-Posten, criticising the fact that sprinters didn't have a chance in the overall standings, and Wiesbaden Kurier, describing it as a reality show and a skiing circus.

In his first Tour in 2008–09, Lukáš Bauer became the second winner of the men's Tour de Ski, the first from Czech Republic.

At a meeting in Venice, Italy, on 7 May 2009, Tour de Ski officials met with officials from the Giro d'Italia road cycle race to learn from the stage race to further improve Tour de Ski competition for the 2009–2010 event.

In the late 2000s and early 2010s, the men's Tour was dominated by Dario Cologna, who won three Tours and two sprint competitions in four years from 2008–09 to 2011–12. By winning the 2009–10 Tour, Lukáš Bauer became the oldest winner aged 32 years and 145 days. Cologna's wins in 2010–11 and 2011–12 made him the first to defend a Tour de Ski title. Even though Alexander Legkov did not win any of the stages in the 2012–13 Tour, he that year became the first Russian winner. Martin Johnsrud Sundby became the first Norwegian winner of the Tour in 2013–14. Sundby defended his title in 2015, but was later stripped of his 2015 title due to his illegal use of asthma medications. The 2015 Tour victory was therefore subsequently awarded to fellow Norwegian Petter Northug. Northug's winning margin of 12.6 seconds down to Evgeniy Belov is the smallest winning margin in the history of the Tour. Sundby won his second title in the 2016 Tour. Sergey Ustiugov became the first skier to lead the Tour from the first stage and all the way to the finish when he won Russia's second Tour in 2016–17. In 2017–18, the year Cologna won his record fourth overall Tour, Alex Harvey of Canada became the first non-European to achieve a podium spot in the overall standings. Johannes Høsflot Klæbo is the youngest winner; he won in 2018–19, 22 years and 76 days old. He was the first skier since Bauer in 2007–08 to win in his Tour de Ski debut. Russian Alexander Bolshunov won in 2021 after reaching podium in all eight stages and with the biggest ever margin over runner-up Maurice Manificat, 3 minutes 23.9 seconds.

== Winners ==
Key
†	Winner won the Sprint standings in the same year
‡	Winner won the Point standings in the same year

- The "Year" column refers to the years the competition was held, and wikilinks to the article about that season.
- The "Distance" column refers to the distance over which the race was held.
- The "Margin" column refers to the margin of time or points by which the winner defeated the runner-up.
- The "Stage wins" column refers to the number of stage wins the winner had during the race.

Tour de Ski men's overall winners
Year	Country	Skier	Distance	Time	Margin	Stage wins	Stages in lead	Stages
2006–07	Germany	Tobias Angerer	68 km (42 mi)	3:29:49.7	+ 46.4	0	4	6
2007–08	Czech Republic	Lukáš Bauer	82 km (51 mi)	3:38:07.4	+ 2:47.3	2	7	8
2008–09	Switzerland	Dario Cologna	67 km (42 mi)	2:56:05.4	+ 59.0	1	6	7
2009–10	Czech Republic	Lukáš Bauer	88 km (55 mi)	4:13:10.6	+ 1:16.4	2	1	8
2010–11	Switzerland	Dario Cologna^{†}	105 km (65 mi)	4:28:02.0	+ 27.3	2	7	8
2011–12	Switzerland	Dario Cologna^{†}	110 km (68 mi)	4:33:17.2	+ 1:02.3	1	5	9
2012–13	Russia	Alexander Legkov	84 km (52 mi)	3:29:28.6	+ 18.7	0	1	7
2013–14	Norway	Martin Johnsrud Sundby^{†}	76 km (47 mi)	3:05:52.2	+ 36.0	1	4	7
2015	Norway	~~Martin Johnsrud Sundby~~ Petter Northug^{†}^{[A]}	79 km (49 mi)	3:27:14.4	+ 12.6	2	6	7
2016	Norway	Martin Johnsrud Sundby^{†}	92 km (57 mi)	3:47:18.2	+ 3:15.7	4	7	8
2016–17	Russia	Sergey Ustiugov^{†}	80 km (50 mi)	3:24:47.9	+ 1:02.9	5	7	7
2017–18	Switzerland	Dario Cologna^{†}	71 km (44 mi)	2:49:29.8	+ 1:26.5	2	4	6
2018–19	Norway	Johannes Høsflot Klæbo^{†}	72 km (45 mi)	3:07:59.4	+ 16.7	4	5	7
2019–20	Russia	Alexander Bolshunov	73 km (45 mi)	2:58:18.1	+ 27.3	1	2	7
2021	Russia	Alexander Bolshunov^{‡}	88 km (55 mi)	3:32:32.3	+ 3:23.9	5	7	8
2021–22	Norway	Johannes Høsflot Klæbo^{‡}	58 km (36 mi)	2:24:56.0	+ 2:03.2	4	6	6
2022–23	Norway	Johannes Høsflot Klæbo^{‡}	68 km (42 mi)	2:44:28.9	+ 59.5	6	7	7
2023–24	Norway	Harald Østberg Amundsen	78 km (48 mi)	3:41:21.9	+ 1:19.2	2	5	7
2024–25	Norway	Johannes Høsflot Klæbo^{‡}	80 km (50 mi)	3:24:17.3	+ 1:23.1	4	7	7
2025–26	Norway	Johannes Høsflot Klæbo^{‡}	48 km (30 mi)	1:56:12.4	+ 30.1	3	6	6

=== Multiple winners ===
The following skiers have won the Tour de Ski on 2 or more occasions.

Multiple winners of the overall Tour de Ski
Skier	Total	Editions
Johannes Høsflot Klæbo (NOR)	5	2018–19, 2021–22, 2022–23, 2024–25, 2025–26
Dario Cologna (SUI)	4	2008–09, 2010–11, 2011–12, 2017–18
Lukáš Bauer (CZE)	2	2007–08, 2009–10
Martin Johnsrud Sundby (NOR)	2	2013–14, 2016
Alexander Bolshunov (RUS)	2	2019–20, 2021

=== By nationality ===
Tour de Ski men's overall winners by nationality
Country	No. of wins	No. of winning skiers
Norway	9	4
Russia	4	3
Switzerland	4	1
Czech Republic	2	1
Germany	1	1

== Footnotes ==
A. Martin Johnsrud Sundby was declared winner of the 2015 Tour de Ski. However, in July 2016 he was stripped of his title due to illegal use of asthma medications.
