= Andrey Melnichenko =

Andrey Melnichenko may refer to:

- Andrey Melnichenko (industrialist) (born 1972), Russian industrialist and philanthropist
- Andrey Melnichenko (skier) (born 1992), Russian cross-country skier
