= Alexander Terentyev =

Russian cross-country skier

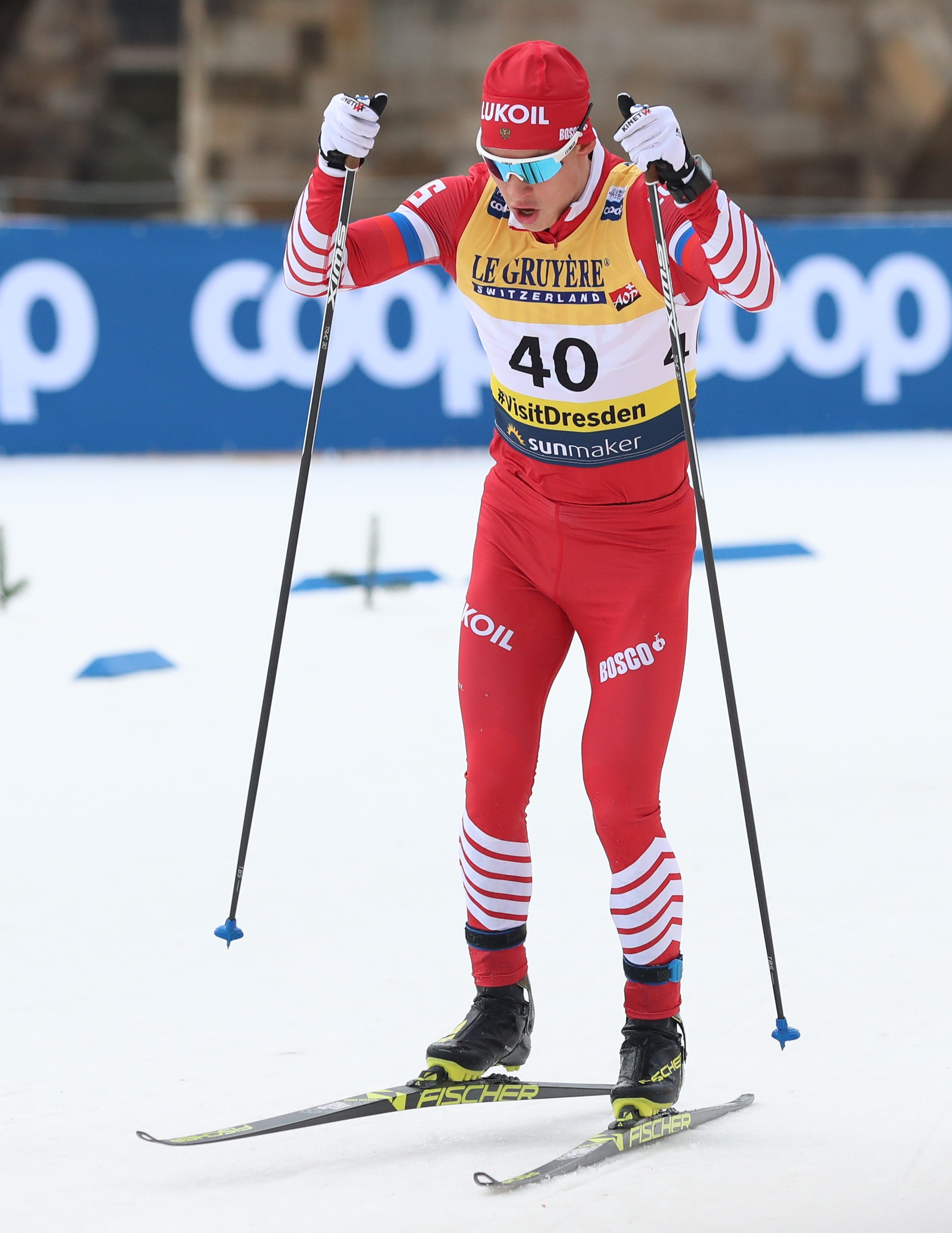
- Alexander Terentyev in 2019

Personal information
- Full name: Alexander Vasilyevich; Terentyev
- Nationality: Russia
- Born: 19 May 1999 (age 27) Naryan-Mar, Russia
- Height: 183 cm (6 ft 0 in)

Sport
- Sport: Skiing

World Cup career
- Seasons: 4 – (2019–2022)
- Indiv. starts: 34
- Indiv. podiums: 1
- Indiv. wins: 1
- Team starts: 6
- Team podiums: 1
- Team wins: 0
- Overall titles: 0 – (17th in 2022)
- Discipline titles: 0
Medal record
Men's cross-country skiing
Representing ROC
Olympic Games
Bronze medal – third place	2022 Beijing	Individual sprint
Bronze medal – third place	2022 Beijing	Team sprint
Representing Russia
U23 World Championships
Gold medal – first place	2021 Vuokatti	Individual sprint
Silver medal – second place	2021 Vuokatti	4 × 5 km mixed relay
Junior World Championships
Gold medal – first place	2019 Lahti	Individual sprint
Silver medal – second place	2019 Lahti	10 km freestyle
Silver medal – second place	2019 Lahti	4 × 5 km relay
Bronze medal – third place	2018 Goms	4 × 5 km relay
Winter Universiade
Gold medal – first place	2019 Krasnoyarsk	Individual sprint
Gold medal – first place	2019 Krasnoyarsk	Mixed team sprint
- Updated on 23 March 2023

Alexander Vasilyevich Terentyev (Russian: Александр Васильевич Терентьев; born 19 May 1999) is a Russian cross-country skier.

== Cross-country skiing results ==
All results are sourced from the International Ski Federation (FIS).

=== Olympic Games ===
- 2 medals – (2 bronze)

Year	Age	15 km individual	30 km skiathlon	50 km mass start	Sprint	4 × 10 km relay	Team sprint
2022	22	—	—	—^{[a]}	Bronze	—	Bronze

^{a} Distance reduced to 30 km due to weather conditions.

=== World Championships ===
Year	Age	15 km individual	30 km skiathlon	50 km mass start	Sprint	4 × 10 km relay	Team sprint
2021	21	—	—	—	14	—	—

=== World Cup ===
==== Season titles ====
- 1 title – (1 U23)

Season	Discipline
2022	Under-23

==== Season standings ====
Season	Age	Discipline standings				Ski Tour standings			
Season	Age	Overall	Distance	Sprint	U23	Nordic Opening	Tour de Ski	Ski Tour 2020	World Cup Final
2019	19	86	—	44	15	—	—	—N/a	—
2020	20	71	NC	33	2nd place, silver medalist(s)	—	—	—	—N/a
2021	21	31	55	9	3rd place, bronze medalist(s)	—	25	—N/a	—N/a
2022 (Note: On 1 March 2022, following the 2022 Russian invasion of Ukraine, FIS decided to not allow athletes from Russian and Belarus to take part in FIS competitions, with an immediate effect.)	22	17	46	6	1st place, gold medalist(s)	—N/a	DNF	—N/a	—N/a

==== Individual podiums ====
- 1 victory – (1 WC)
- 1 podium – (1 WC)

No.	Season	Date	Location	Race	Level	Place
1	2021–22	26 November 2021	Rukatunturi, Finland	1.4 km Sprint C	World Cup	1st

==== Team podiums ====
- 1 podium – (1 RL)

No.	Season	Date	Location	Race	Level	Place	Teammates
1	2021–22	5 December 2021	Lillehammer, Norway	4 × 7.5 km Relay C/F	World Cup	2nd	Semikov / Maltsev / Ustiugov
