= Ivan Yakimushkin =

Russian cross-country skier

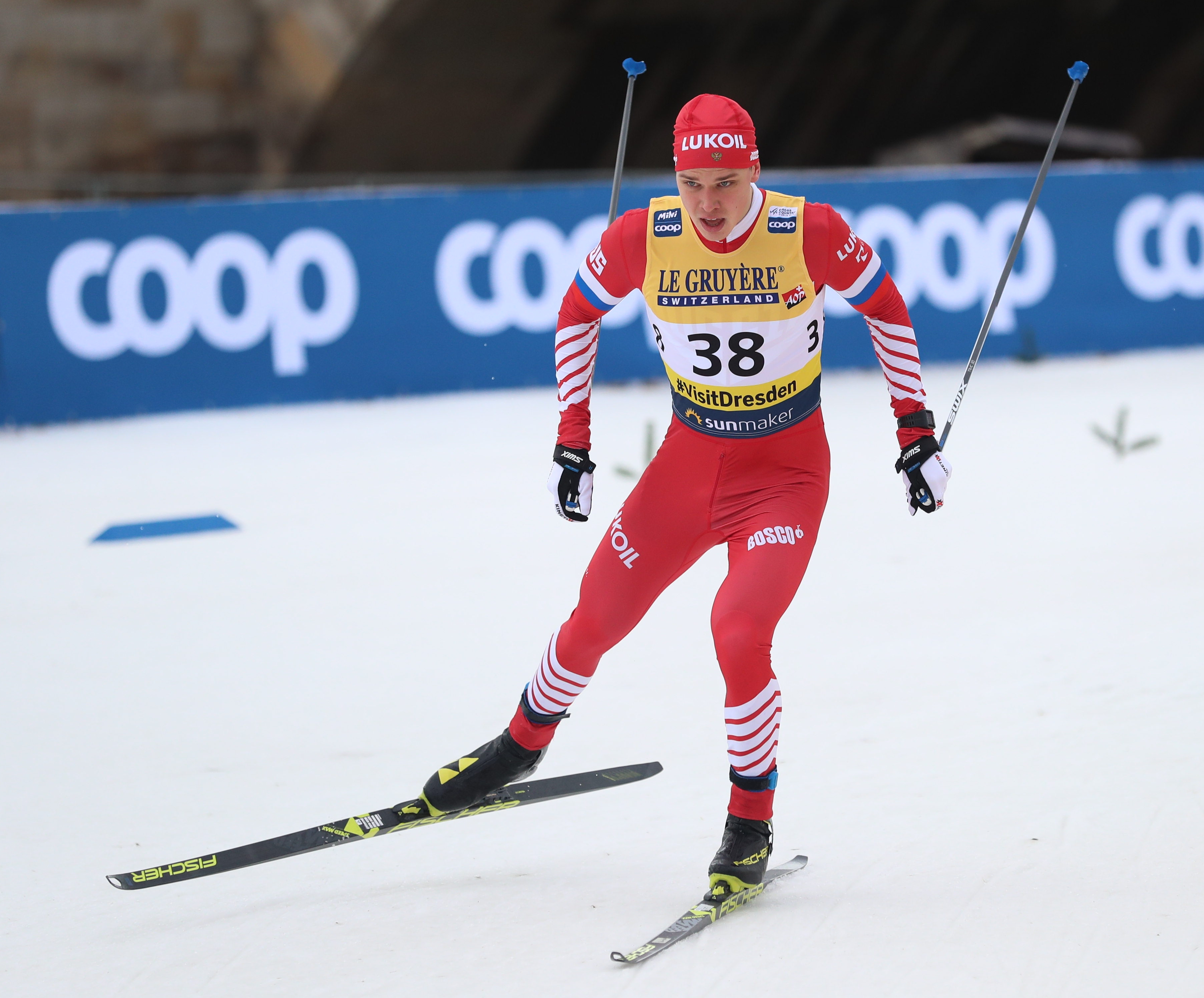
- Yakimushkin in 2019

Personal information
- Full name: Ivan Andreyevich; Yakimushkin
- Nationality: Russia
- Born: 17 June 1996 (age 30) Murom, Vladimir Oblast, Russia

Sport
- Sport: Skiing

World Cup career
- Seasons: 6 – (2017–2022)
- Indiv. starts: 70
- Indiv. podiums: 5
- Indiv. wins: 0
- Team starts: 5
- Team podiums: 2
- Team wins: 1
- Overall titles: 0 – (2nd in 2021)
- Discipline titles: 0
Medal record
Men's cross-country skiing
International nordic ski competitions
Event	1st	2nd	3rd
Olympic Games	0	1	0
World Championships	0	1	0
Total	0	2	0
Representing ROC
Olympic Games
Silver medal – second place	2022 Beijing	50 km freestyle
Representing Russian Ski Federation
World Championships
Silver medal – second place	2021 Oberstdorf	4 × 10 km relay
Representing Russia
U23 World Championships
Bronze medal – third place	2019 Lahti	30 km classical
Bronze medal – third place	2019 Lahti	15 km freestyle
Bronze medal – third place	2018 Goms	15 km classical
Junior World Championships
Gold medal – first place	2015 Almaty	4 × 5 km relay
Gold medal – first place	2016 Râșnov	15 km freestyle
Silver medal – second place	2015 Almaty	20 km skiathlon
Silver medal – second place	2016 Râșnov	4 × 5 km relay
Winter Universiade
Gold medal – first place	2019 Krasnoyarsk	10 km freestyle
Gold medal – first place	2019 Krasnoyarsk	10 km classical
Gold medal – first place	2019 Krasnoyarsk	4 × 7.5 km relay
- Updated on 23 March 2023

Ivan Andreyevich Yakimushkin (Russian: Иван Андреевич Якимушкин; born 17 June 1996) is a Russian cross-country skier.

== Career ==
Ivan Yakimushkin was born 17 June 1996 to a sportive family. He started cross-country skiing from the age of eight, his first coach was Galina Kabanova. His father Andrey Vladimirovich replaced her when Ivan was 12. Yakimushkin first trained in Murom, then in Tyumen.

At the 2015 Nordic Junior World Ski Championships in Almaty, Yakimushkin won silver in 10 km classical/freestyle skiathlon and gold as part of the relay team. A year later he won another gold medal, now in 15 km freestyle. His relay team finished second.

He debuted in the 2017–18 FIS World Cup season, in the sprint freestyle Stage World Cup in Lenzerheide, being part of the 2017–18 Tour de Ski. In the overall standings he was placed 21.

Yakimushkin won his first national championships title in Syktyvkar, in 15 km freestyle.

At the 2019 Winter Universiade in Krasnoyarsk, Yakimushkin won two gold medals, in 10 km classical and 10 km freestyle pursuit.

Yakimushkin has made a major breakthrough in 2020-2021. After scoring three individual podiums and showing solid performance in the Tour de Ski (4th place) he finished second in both overall and distance standings of the World Cup only behind his teammate Alexander Bolshunov.

In an interview to the Russian Olympic Channel in February 2021 Yakimushkin said he has no special pre-race rituals or habits, underlined key role of his family in his athletic upbringing and career, and named Alexey Prokurorov as the only sportsperson he could call a kind of a childhood idol.

Yakimushkin is a student in the Oil Faculty at the Tyumen Industrial University.

== Cross-country skiing results ==
All results are sourced from the International Ski Federation (FIS).

=== Olympic Games ===
- 1 medal (1 silver)

Year	Age	15 km individual	30 km skiathlon	50 km mass start	Sprint	4 × 10 km relay	Team sprint
2022	25	13	—	Silver^{[a]}	—	—	—

^{a} Distance reduced to 30 km due to weather conditions.

=== World Championships ===
- 1 medal – (1 silver)

Year	Age	15 km individual	30 km skiathlon	50 km mass start	Sprint	4 × 10 km relay	Team sprint
2021	24	11	8	—	—	Silver	—

=== World Cup ===
==== Season standings ====
Season	Age	Discipline standings				Ski Tour standings			
Season	Age	Overall	Distance	Sprint	U23	Nordic Opening	Tour de Ski	Ski Tour 2020	World Cup Final
2018	21	65	58	NC	8	—	21	—N/a	—
2019	22	58	47	NC	9	11	—	—N/a	—
2020	23	17	13	80	—N/a	18	17	18	—N/a
2021	24	2nd place, silver medalist(s)	2nd place, silver medalist(s)	31	—N/a	13	4	—N/a	—N/a
2022 (Note: On 1 March 2022, following the 2022 Russian invasion of Ukraine, FIS decided to not allow athletes from Russian and Belarus to take part in FIS competitions, with an immediate effect.)	25	11	11	50	—N/a	—N/a	6	—N/a	—N/a

==== Individual podiums ====
- 5 podiums – (1 WC, 4 SWC)

No.	Season	Date	Location	Race	Level	Place
1	2019–20	31 December 2019	Toblach, Italy	15 km Individual F	Stage World Cup	2nd
2	2019–20	9 February 2020	Falun, Sweden	15 km Mass Start F	World Cup	3rd
3	2020–21	2 January 2021	Val Müstair, Switzerland	15 km Mass Start C	Stage World Cup	3rd
4	2020–21	5 January 2021	Toblach, Italy	15 km Individual F	Stage World Cup	3rd
5	2020–21	6 January 2021	Toblach, Italy	15 km Pursuit C	Stage World Cup	2nd

==== Team podiums ====
- 1 victory – (1 RL)
- 2 podiums – (2 RL)

No.	Season	Date	Location	Race	Level	Place	Teammate
1	2019–20	8 December 2019	Lillehammer, Norway	4 × 7.5 km Relay C/F	World Cup	1st	Belov / Poroshkin / Ustiugov
2	2020–21	24 January 2021	Lahti, Finland	4 × 7.5 km Relay C/F	World Cup	3rd	Semikov / Melnichenko / Ustiugov
