= 2016 Nordic Junior World Ski Championships =

Ski event in Râșnov, Romania

FIS Nordic Junior and U23 World Ski Championships 2016
- Host city: Râșnov, Romania
- Events: 21
- Opening: 22 February
- Closing: 28 February
- Main venue: Cheile Grâdiștei; Predeal Valea Râșnoavei; Trambulină Valea Cărbunării

The FIS Nordic Junior and U23 World Ski Championships 2016 took place in Râșnov, Romania from 22 February to 28 February 2016. It was the 39th Junior World Championships and the 11th Under-23 World Championships in Nordic skiing.

Due to weather conditions, the 5 km and 10 km classic interval start cross-country skiing events were moved one day forward. 10 km and 20 km skiathlon were replaced by 10 and 15 km freestyle mass start. Both relays were moved forward by two days.

Nordic combined 10 km/normal hill was moved one day forward, while 5 km/normal hill was moved three days earlier than scheduled.

Individual ski jumping events were arranged two days earlier than scheduled, the mixed team event two days earlier, and the men's team event three days ahead of schedule.

== Medal summary ==
=== Junior events ===
==== Cross-country skiing ====
Event	Gold		Silver		Bronze	
Men's Junior Events
Men's junior sprint free	Johannes Høsflot Klæbo; Norway	2:31.42	Magnus Kim; South Korea	2:32.09	Giacomo Gabrielli; Italy	2:32.44
Men's junior 10 km classic	Johannes Høsflot Klæbo; Norway	28:57.8	Magnus Kim; South Korea	29:09.0	Lauri Lepistö; Finland	29:23.2
Men's junior 15 km mass start free	Ivan Yakimushkin; Russia	31:19.1	Mattis Stenshagen; Norway	31:31.3	Denis Spitsov; Russia	31:48.3
Men's junior 4 × 5 km relay	Norway; Mattis Stenshagen; Vebjørn Hegdal; Jan Thomas Jenssen; Johannes Høsflot Klæbo	43:07.5	Russia; Alexander Bolshunov; Ivan Kirillov; Denis Spitsov; Ivan Yakimushkin	43:55.2	France; Jules Lapierre; Martin Collet; Hugo Lapalus; Camille Laude	44:25.7
Ladies' Junior Events
Ladies' junior sprint free	Amalie Håkonsen Ous; Norway	2:55.77	Lotta Udnes Weng; Norway	2:55.99	Jenny Solin; Sweden	2:56.48
Ladies' junior 5 km classic	Marte Mæhlum Johansen; Norway	15:34.0	Lotta Udnes Weng; Norway	15:39.3	Antonia Fräbel; Germany	15:44.7
Ladies' junior 10 km mass start free	Ebba Andersson; Sweden	23:29.8	Katharina Hennig; Germany	23:58.8	Tiril Udnes Weng; Norway	24:02.0
Ladies' junior 4 × 2.5 km relay	Sweden; Emma Ribom; Elina Rönnlund; Ebba Andersson; Jenny Solin	22:30.7	Norway; Amalie Håkonsen Ous; Marte Mæhlum Johansen; Tiril Udnes Weng; Lotta Udnes Weng	22:31.3	Russia; Polina Nekrasova; Alexandra Golubitskaya; Yana Kirpichenko; Olga Kucheruk	22:40.9

==== Nordic Combined ====
Event	Gold		Silver		Bronze	
Normal hill/10 km	Bernhard Flaschberger; Austria	28:02.1	Vinzenz Geiger; Germany	29:01.7	Terence Weber; Germany	29:10.6
Normal hill/5 km	Tomáš Portyk; Czech Republic	11:01.5	Terence Weber; Germany	11:06.6	Kristjan Ilves; Estonia	11:06.9
Team normal hill/4 × 5 km	Austria; Florian Dagn; Noa Ian Mraz; Samuel Mraz; Bernhard Flaschberger	57:31.8	Germany; Martin Hahn; Tim Kopp; Terence Weber; Vinzenz Geiger	58:58.1	Finland; Wille Karhumaa; Atte Korhonen; Mikko Hulkko; Eero Hirvonen	1:00:16.3

==== Ski jumping ====
Event	Gold		Silver		Bronze	
Men's Junior Events
Men's junior individual normal hill	David Siegel; Germany	249.0	Domen Prevc; Slovenia	245.0	Ryōyū Kobayashi; Japan	244.8
Men's junior team normal hill	Germany; Jonathan Siegel; Adrian Sell; Tim Fuchs; David Siegel	866.7	Norway; Marius Lindvik; Are Sumstad; Robin Pedersen; Halvor Egner Granerud	838.4	Japan; Masamitsu Itō; Yūken Iwasa; Naoki Nakamura; Ryōyū Kobayashi	808.8
Ladies' Junior Events
Ladies' junior normal hill	Chiara Hölzl; Austria	209.0	Katharina Althaus; Germany	197.4	Sofia Tikhonova; Russia	184.9
Mixed Junior Events
Mixed junior team normal hill	Slovenia; Nika Križnar; Bor Pavlovčič; Ema Klinec; Domen Prevc	882.8	Austria; Claudia Purker; Maximilian Steiner; Chiara Hölzl; Janni Reisenauer	869.8	Germany; Katharina Althaus; Tim Fuchs; Anna Rupprecht; David Siegel	865.7

=== Under-23 events ===
==== Cross-country skiing ====
Event	Gold		Silver		Bronze	
Men's Under-23 Events
Men's under-23 sprint free	Lucas Chanavat; France	2:35.78	Karl-Johan Dyvik; Sweden	2:36.70	Jean Tiberghien; France	2:36.89
Men's under-23 15 kilometre classic	Jens Burman; Sweden	40:02.0	Aleksey Chervotkin; Russia	40:28.8	Mikael Gunnulfsen; Norway	40:38.6
Men's under-23 15 kilometre free	Simen Hegstad Krüger; Norway	31:13.3	Clément Parisse; France	31:26.6	Alexandre Pouyé; France	31:46.1
Ladies' Under-23 Events
Ladies' under-23 sprint free	Jonna Sundling; Sweden	2:52.14	Nadine Fähndrich; Switzerland	2:52.50	Maja Dahlqvist; Sweden	2:53.47
Ladies' under-23 10 kilometre classic	Anastasia Sedova; Russia	28:49.4	Victoria Carl; Germany	29:02.5	Petra Nováková; Czech Republic	29:06.4
Ladies' under-23 10 kilometre free	Victoria Carl; Germany	23:14.1	Lea Einfalt; Slovenia	23:33.0	Anastasia Sedova; Russia	23:41.2

=== Medal table ===
Rank	Nation	Gold	Silver	Bronze	Total
1	Norway (NOR)	6	5	2	13
2	Sweden (SWE)	4	1	2	7
3	Germany (GER)	3	6	3	12
4	Austria (AUT)	3	1	0	4
5	Russia (RUS)	2	2	4	8
6	Slovenia (SLO)	1	2	0	3
7	France (FRA)	1	1	3	5
8	Czech Republic (CZE)	1	0	1	2
9	South Korea (KOR)	0	2	0	2
10	Switzerland (SUI)	0	1	0	1
11	Finland (FIN)	0	0	2	2
11	Japan (JPN)	0	0	2	2
13	Estonia (EST)	0	0	1	1
13	Italy (ITA)	0	0	1	1
Totals (14 entries)		21	21	21	63
