= Ilia Semikov =

Russian cross-country skier

Personal information
- Nationality: Russia
- Born: 22 October 1993 (age 32) Ust-Tsilma, Komi Republic, Russia

Sport
- Sport: Skiing

World Cup career
- Seasons: 5 – (2017, 2019–2022)
- Indiv. starts: 36
- Indiv. podiums: 0
- Team starts: 6
- Team podiums: 4
- Team wins: 0
- Overall titles: 0 – (18th in 2021)
- Discipline titles: 0
- Updated on 23 March 2023

Ilia Sergeevich Semikov (Russian: Илья Сергеевич Семиков; born 22 October 1993) is a Russian cross-country skier who competes internationally with the Russian national team.

He placed 11th overall in the 2021 Tour de Ski, and represented Russia at the FIS Nordic World Ski Championships 2021 in Oberstdorf, Germany, in men's 50 kilometre classical.

== Cross-country skiing results ==
All results are sourced from the International Ski Federation (FIS).

=== Olympic Games ===
Year	Age	15 km individual	30 km skiathlon	50 km mass start	Sprint	4 × 10 km relay	Team sprint
2022	28	9	—	—^{[a]}	—	—	—

^{a} Distance reduced to 30 km due to weather conditions.

=== World Championships ===
Year	Age	15 km individual	30 km skiathlon	50 km mass start	Sprint	4 × 10 km relay	Team sprint
2021	27	—	—	15	—	—	—

=== World Cup ===
==== Season standings ====
Season	Age	Discipline standings			Ski Tour standings			
Season	Age	Overall	Distance	Sprint	Nordic Opening	Tour de Ski	Ski Tour 2020	World Cup Final
2017	23	149	103	—	—	—	—N/a	—N/a
2019	25	60	35	NC	—	—	—N/a	—
2020	26	56	45	50	43	—	—	—N/a
2021	27	18	18	44	21	11	—N/a	—N/a
2022 (Note: On 1 March 2022, following the 2022 Russian invasion of Ukraine, FIS decided to not allow athletes from Russian and Belarus to take part in FIS competitions, with an immediate effect.)	28	25	16	74	—N/a	17	—N/a	—N/a

==== Team podiums ====
- 4 podiums – (4 RL)

No.	Season	Date	Location	Race	Level	Place	Teammates
1	2019–20	8 December 2019	Lillehammer, Norway	4 × 7.5 km Relay C/F	World Cup	2nd	Larkov / Spitsov / Melnichenko
2	2019–20	1 March 2020	Lahti, Finland	4 × 7.5 km Relay C/F	World Cup	3rd	Bessmertnykh / Spitsov / Melnichenko
3	2020–21	24 January 2021	Lahti, Finland	4 × 7.5 km Relay C/F	World Cup	3rd	Yakimushkin / Melnichenko / Ustiugov
4	2021–22	5 December 2021	Lillehammer, Norway	4 × 7.5 km Relay C/F	World Cup	2nd	Terentyev / Maltsev / Ustiugov
