= Sergey Ustiugov =

Russian cross-country skier (born 1992)

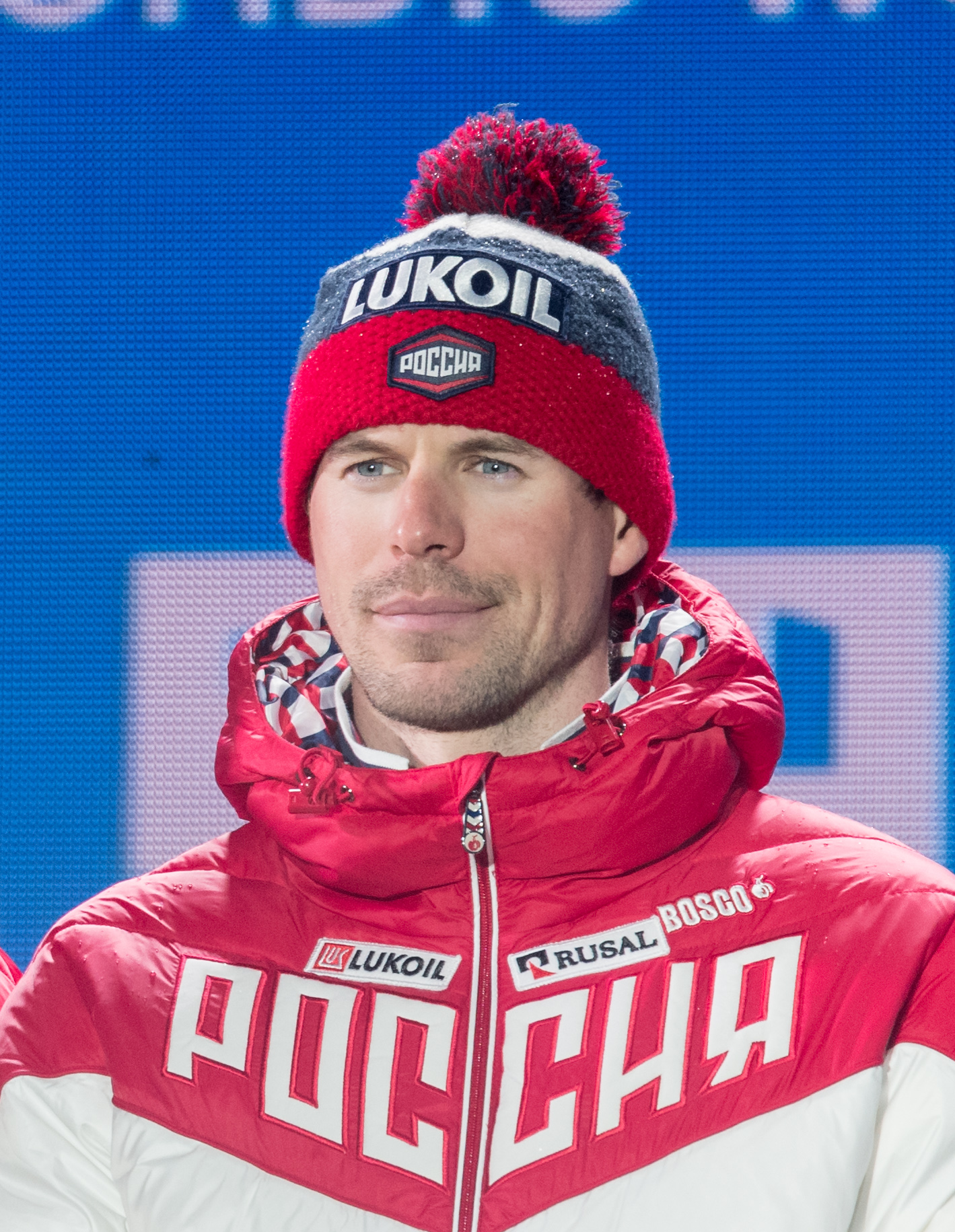
- Sergey Ustiugov in 2019

Personal information
- Full name: Sergey Aleksandrovich; Ustiugov
- Nationality: Russia
- Born: 8 April 1992 (age 34) Mezhdurechensky, Russia
- Height: 1.84 m (6 ft 0 in)

Sport
- Sport: Skiing

World Cup career
- Seasons: 10 – (2013–2022)
- Indiv. starts: 138
- Indiv. podiums: 46
- Indiv. wins: 15
- Team starts: 13
- Team podiums: 7
- Team wins: 2
- Overall titles: 0 – (2nd in 2017)
- Discipline titles: 0
Medal record
Men's cross-country skiing
International nordic ski competitions
Event	1st	2nd	3rd
Olympic Games	1	0	0
World Championships	2	4	1
Total	3	4	1
Representing ROC
Olympic Games
Gold medal – first place	2022 Beijing	4 × 10 km relay
Representing Russia
World Championships
Gold medal – first place	2017 Lahti	30 km skiathlon
Gold medal – first place	2017 Lahti	Team sprint
Silver medal – second place	2017 Lahti	Individual sprint
Silver medal – second place	2017 Lahti	50 km freestyle
Silver medal – second place	2017 Lahti	4 × 10 km relay
Silver medal – second place	2019 Seefeld	4 × 10 km relay
Bronze medal – third place	2013 Val di Fiemme	4 × 10 km relay
U23 World Championships
Gold medal – first place	2013 Liberec	15 km freestyle
Gold medal – first place	2013 Liberec	30 km skiathlon
Gold medal – first place	2014 Val di Fiemme	Individual sprint
Silver medal – second place	2014 Val di Fiemme	15 km classical
Junior World Championships
Gold medal – first place	2011 Otepää	Individual sprint
Gold medal – first place	2012 Erzurum	Individual sprint
Gold medal – first place	2012 Erzurum	10 km classical
Gold medal – first place	2012 Erzurum	20 km skiathlon
Gold medal – first place	2012 Erzurum	4 × 5 km relay
Silver medal – second place	2011 Otepää	4 × 5 km relay
- Updated on 23 March 2023

Sergey Aleksandrovich Ustiugov (Russian: Сергей Александрович Устюгов; born 8 April 1992) is a Russian cross-country skier, Olympic champion, world champion and Tour de Ski winner.

== Career ==
=== Early career ===
In 2001, Sergey Ustiugov started practicing cross-country skiing in the biathlon section of the sports school of Mezhdurechensky. His head coach was Ivan Gennadievich Vragin.

Ten years later he won gold in sprint at the World Youth Cross-Country Skiing Championships in Otepää, Estonia. A year later he became four-times champion of the Youth Championships in Erzurum, Turkey, in sprint, 10 km race, skiathlon and relay. In 2013, he participated at the Junior Championships in Liberec, Czech Republic in the Under-23 classification, winning two gold medals in 15 km free style and 30 km skiatlon. At the 2014 Junior Championships in Val di Fiemme he won gold in individual sprint.

=== 2011–15: World Cup debut and new coaching staff ===
Ustiugov debuted on 6 February 2011 at the World Cup in the relay event.

At the FIS Nordic World Ski Championships 2013 in Vale di Flemme, Ustiugov and his relay team claimed the bronze medal. However, in the individual 15 km freestyle race, he finished 47th. In the same year, he reached a podium place for the first time in Davos on 15 December, finishing third in the freestyle sprint. The following month he won a stage in the Czech Nové Město in the freestyle sprint. He debuted at the 2014 Winter Olympics in sprint, where he finished fifth after falling near the final passage. In May 2014, Ustiugov switched his coach Oleg Perevozchikov in favor of the Swiss-German duo Reto Burgermeister/Isabel Knaute.

=== 2015–17: Tour de Ski champion, world champion ===
In the 2015–16 WC season, in January 2015, he and Alexey Petukhov won the team sprint event at a World Cup stage in Otepää. In Rybinsk, he finished second in freestyle sprint and third in individual 15 km freestyle. He participated at the 2016 Tour de Ski, reaching third place overall. In the Nove Mesto stage, he won silver and bronze in the 15 km freestyle and relay event, subsequently. In February, he won the mass start 15 km free style event in Swedish Falun. At the season-ending Ski Tour Canada, he clinched second place overall, reaching five times the pedestal.

In October, Ustyugov and other skiers, including Evgeny Belov and Stanislav Volzhentsev, conflicted with Burgermeister-Knaute, leading to the President of the Russian Federation of Cross-Country Skiing and main coach of the Russian national team Elena Vyalbe allowing him to switch the coaching group; German Markus Kramer, who previously coached 2014 Olympic Champion Alexander Legkov among others, was chosen as the new head coach for Ustiugov.

In the new season, Ustiugov won the 2016-17 Tour de Ski in January. He then went on to win five stages, only losing in the 6th. In the last stage, the final climb, he started first and, by saving the handicap, won the overall tour. He was the second Russian since Legkov to win the Tour de Ski. Ustiugov also set a record for the most wins in succession (5). Before him, the record was four winning stages in a row, set by Johnsrud Sundby.

He started the 2017 FIS Nordic World Ski Championships by winning the silver medal in the sprint competition. Then he went on winning his first ever gold medal at the Championships in 30 km skiathlon. With Nikita Kriukov he won his second gold medal in the team sprint.

After the Championships, Ustiugov took another spot on the podium in Drammen after finishing third in the final in the classical sprint. Overall, he finished the season second after Johnsrud Sundby.

=== 2017–18: Steadiness and Decline ===
Ustiugov did not start well in the next season, finishing 23rd in the Ruka Triple. However, between the Ruka Triple and the Tour de Ski, he rebounded and finished three times as runner-up in three different disciplines (sprint, individual, and pursuit). At first, he started well to defend the Tour de Ski title after he finished first, tenth, and second in Lenzerheide, in the sprint, individual, and pursuit, respectively, but beginning with the next stage he always finished beyond the top-10 position, and in the pursuit climb he did not participate, leaving him without a place in the overall tour ranking; during the mass start stage in Val di Fiemme he finished with pain in the back and so could not participate in the deciding stage.

Amidst the doping accusations, several clean athletes, including Ustiugov, An and Shipulin, were not invited by the International Olympic Committee (IOC) to participate at the 2018 Winter Olympics, including Ustiugov. Prior to the Olympics, Ustiugov participated at the 50 km marathon event of the Ski Classics series in Cortina d'Ampezzo, finishing third. After his appeal and that of 46 other athletes to the Court of Arbitration for Sport were declined, Ustiugov participated at the Russian Cup created by the Russian government for athletes who were banned by the IOC and won the team sprint with Alexander Legkov. He skipped the remaining stages that season.

=== 2018–19: Comeback ===
On 23 October 2018, Ustiugov injured his finger during practice in Val Senales with roller skis. Eight days later, he was successfully operated in Moscow. He returned to practice on 4 November, and on 16 December he came back to sports in Davos, in the eighth stage of the new FIS World Cup season. Ustiugov finished 25th.

In the 13th edition of the Tour de Ski, Ustiugov won the second stage in 15 km individual freestyle, exactly a year after his last victory. After finishing third, third, and second in Sprint F, 15 km C Mass Start and 15 km C Pursuit, respectively, Ustiugov failed in Stage 6, 15 km C Mass Start in Val di Fiemme. In the third-last round, he got tired and fell behind the leaders, with his teammates Sobakarev, Larkov, and Vylegzhanin taking the lead. The Russians were outskated by Klaebo and De Fabiani before the finish line. Ustiugov finished 16th. In the last pursuit climb stage, he rebounded and won over a minute, almost reaching exhausted Klaebo after showing strong climb performance. As a result, he finished 2nd in the overall classification.

Ustiugov finished the season at the World Ski Championships, during which he received problems with his gallbladders.

=== 2020–21: COVID-19 infection and recovery ===
Ustiugov tested positive for COVID-19 in October 2020 during practice in Italian Val Senales. He resumed practice in early December after slowly recovering from the infection. He returned competing in a national, non-World Cup event in Kirovo-Chepetsk in January 2021. In his first World Cup participation for a while, Ustiugov and his relay partners finished third in Lahti. While not winning a podium place this season, he qualified thrice to the sprint finals in Falun, Ulricehamn, and Oberstdorf.

== Personal life ==
Sergey Ustiugov was born in Mezhdurechensky as one of the youngest children in a large family; he is of Mansi descent. He married junior cross-country ski champion Elena Soboleva on 9 August 2019. Their child, Kira, was born on 17 January 2020.

He is nicknamed "The Moose" (лось, los' ) by his fans.

== Cross-country skiing results ==
All results are sourced from the International Ski Federation (FIS).

=== Olympic Games ===
- 1 medal – (1 gold)

Year	Age	15 km individual	30 km skiathlon	50 km mass start	Sprint	4 × 10 km relay	Team sprint
2014	21	—	—	—	5	—	—
2022	29	—	—	—^{[a]}	8	Gold	—

^{a} Distance reduced to 30 km due to weather conditions.

=== World Championships ===
- 7 medals – (2 gold, 4 silver, 1 bronze)

Year	Age	15 km individual	30 km skiathlon	50 km mass start	Sprint	4 × 10 km relay	Team sprint
2013	20	47	—	—	—	Bronze	—
2015	22	28	—	—	16	—	—
2017	24	—	Gold	Silver	Silver	Silver	Gold
2019	26	—	9	—	DSQ	Silver	—
2021	28	—	—	—	5	—	—

=== World Cup ===
==== Season standings ====
Season	Age	Discipline standings				Ski Tour standings				
Season	Age	Overall	Distance	Sprint	U23	Nordic Opening	Tour de Ski	Ski Tour 2020	World Cup Final	Ski Tour Canada
2013	20	55	102	23	—N/a	—	—	—N/a	36	—N/a
2014	21	11	46	6	—N/a	5	—	—N/a	11	—N/a
2015	22	26	44	6	2nd place, silver medalist(s)	47	—	—N/a	—N/a	—N/a
2016	23	4	5	6	—N/a	21	3rd place, bronze medalist(s)	—N/a	—N/a	2nd place, silver medalist(s)
2017	24	2nd place, silver medalist(s)	7	5	—N/a	35	1st place, gold medalist(s)	—N/a	—	—N/a
2018	25	12	10	12	—N/a	23	DNF	—N/a	—	—N/a
2019	26	10	17	35	—N/a	—	2nd place, silver medalist(s)	—N/a	—	—N/a
2020	27	8	8	19	—N/a	10	2nd place, silver medalist(s)	DNF	—N/a	—N/a
2021	28	39	39	18	—N/a	—	—	—N/a	—N/a	—N/a
2022 (Note: On 1 March 2022, following the 2022 Russian invasion of Ukraine, FIS decided not to allow athletes from Russian and Belarus to take part in FIS competitions, with an immediate effect.)	29	19	12	21	—N/a	—N/a	—	—N/a	—N/a	—N/a

==== Individual podiums ====
- 15 victories – (4 WC, 11 SWC)
- 46 podiums – (21 WC, 25 SWC)

No.	Season	Date	Location	Race	Level	Place
1	2013–14	15 December 2013	Davos, Switzerland	1.5 km Sprint F	World Cup	3rd
2	2013–14	11 January 2014	Nové Město, Czech Republic	1.6 km Sprint F	World Cup	1st
3	2014–15	23 January 2015	Rybinsk, Russia	15 km Individual F	World Cup	3rd
4	2014–15	24 January 2015	Rybinsk, Russia	1.3 km Sprint F	World Cup	2nd
5	2015–16	1 January 2016	Lenzerheide, Switzerland	1.5 km Sprint F	Stage World Cup	2nd
6	2015–16	5 January 2016	Oberstdorf, Germany	1.5 km Sprint C	Stage World Cup	2nd
7	2015–16	1–10 January 2016	(Switzerland) (Germany) (Italy) Tour de Ski	Overall Standings	World Cup	3rd
8	2015–16	23 January 2016	Nové Město, Czech Republic	15 km Individual F	World Cup	3rd
9	2015–16	14 February 2016	Falun, Sweden	15 km Mass Start F	World Cup	1st
10	2015–16	1 March 2016	Gatineau, Canada	1.7 km Sprint F	Stage World Cup	1st
11	2015–16	2 March 2016	Gatineau, Canada	17.5 km Mass Start C	Stage World Cup	3rd
12	2015–16	4 March 2016	Quebec City, Canada	1.7 km Sprint F	Stage World Cup	3rd
13	2015–16	5 March 2016	Quebec City, Canada	15 km Pursuit F	Stage World Cup	1st
14	2015–16	9 March 2016	Canmore, Canada	15 km + 15 km Skiathlon C/F	Stage World Cup	2nd
15	2015–16	1–12 March 2016	Ski Tour Canada	Overall Standings	World Cup	2nd
16	2016–17	3 December 2016	Lillehammer, Norway	10 km Individual F	Stage World Cup	3rd
17	2016–17	11 December 2016	Davos, Switzerland	1.6 km Sprint F	World Cup	1st
18	2016–17	31 December 2016	Val Müstair, Switzerland	1.5 km Sprint F	Stage World Cup	1st
19	2016–17	1 January 2017	Val Müstair, Switzerland	10 km Mass Start C	Stage World Cup	1st
20	2016–17	3 January 2017	Oberstdorf, Germany	10 km + 10 km Skiathlon C/F	Stage World Cup	1st
21	2016–17	4 January 2017	Oberstdorf, Germany	15 km Pursuit F	Stage World Cup	1st
22	2016–17	6 January 2017	Toblach, Italy	10 km Individual F	Stage World Cup	1st
23	2016–17	7 January 2017	Val di Fiemme, Italy	15 km Mass Start C	Stage World Cup	2nd
24	2016–17	31 December 2016 – 8 January 2017	(Switzerland) (Germany) (Italy) Tour de Ski	Overall Standings	World Cup	1st
25	2016–17	18 February 2017	Otepää, Estonia	1.6 km Sprint F	World Cup	3rd
26	2016–17	8 March 2017	Drammen, Norway	1.2 km Sprint C	World Cup	3rd
27	2017–18	2 December 2017	Lillehammer, Norway	1.5 km Sprint C	World Cup	2nd
28	2017–18	10 December 2017	Davos, Switzerland	15 km Individual F	World Cup	2nd
29	2017–18	17 December 2017	Toblach, Italy	15 km Pursuit C	World Cup	2nd
30	2017–18	30 December 2017	Lenzerheide, Switzerland	1.5 km Sprint F	Stage World Cup	1st
31	2017–18	1 January 2018	Lenzerheide, Switzerland	15 km Pursuit F	Stage World Cup	2nd
32	2018–19	30 December 2018	Toblach, Italy	15 km Individual F	Stage World Cup	1st
33	2018–19	1 January 2019	Val Müstair, Switzerland	1.4 km Sprint F	Stage World Cup	3rd
34	2018–19	2 January 2019	Oberstdorf, Germany	15 km Mass Start C	Stage World Cup	3rd
35	2018–19	3 January 2019	Oberstdorf, Germany	15 km Pursuit F	Stage World Cup	2nd
36	2018–19	29 December 2018 – 6 January 2019	(Italy) (Switzerland) (Germany) Tour de Ski	Overall Standings	World Cup	2nd
37	2019–20	15 December 2019	Davos, Switzerland	15 km Individual F	World Cup	2nd
38	2019–20	28 December 2019	Lenzerheide, Switzerland	15 km Mass Start F	Stage World Cup	1st
39	2019–20	31 December 2019	Toblach, Italy	15 km Individual F	Stage World Cup	1st
40	2019–20	1 January 2020	Toblach, Italy	15 km Pursuit C	Stage World Cup	2nd
41	2019–20	3 January 2020	Val di Fiemme, Italy	15 km Mass Start C	Stage World Cup	2nd
42	2019–20	4 January 2020	Val di Fiemme, Italy	1.5 km Sprint C	Stage World Cup	2nd
43	2019–20	28 December 2019 – 5 January 2020	(Switzerland) (Italy) Tour de Ski	Overall Standings	World Cup	2nd
44	2021–22	28 November 2021	Rukatunturi, Finland	15 km Pursuit F	World Cup	2nd
45	2021–22	11 December 2021	Davos, Switzerland	1.5 km Sprint F	World Cup	2nd
46	2021–22	12 December 2021	Davos, Switzerland	15 km Individual F	World Cup	3rd

==== Team podiums ====
- 2 victories – (1 RL, 1 TS)
- 7 podiums – (6 RL, 1 TS)

No.	Season	Date	Location	Race	Level	Place	Teammate(s)
1	2014–15	18 January 2015	Otepää, Estonia	6 × 1.5 km Team Sprint F	World Cup	1st	Petukhov
2	2015–16	24 January 2016	Nové Město, Czech Republic	4 × 7.5 km Relay C/F	World Cup	2nd	Belov / Legkov / Chervotkin
3	2016–17	18 December 2016	La Clusaz, France	4 × 7.5 km Relay C/F	World Cup	2nd	Belov / Legkov / Chervotkin
4	2018–19	27 January 2019	Ulricehamn, Sweden	4 × 7.5 km Relay C/F	World Cup	2nd	Larkov / Bolshunov / Melnichenko
5	2019–20	8 December 2019	Lillehammer, Norway	4 × 7.5 km Relay C/F	World Cup	1st	Yakimushkin / Belov / Poroshkin
6	2020–21	24 January 2021	Lahti, Finland	4 × 7.5 km Relay C/F	World Cup	3rd	Semikov / Yakimushkin / Melnichenko
7	2021–22	5 December 2021	Lillehammer, Norway	4 × 7.5 km Relay C/F	World Cup	2nd	Terentyev / Semikov / Maltsev
