= Denis Spitsov =

Russian cross-country skier

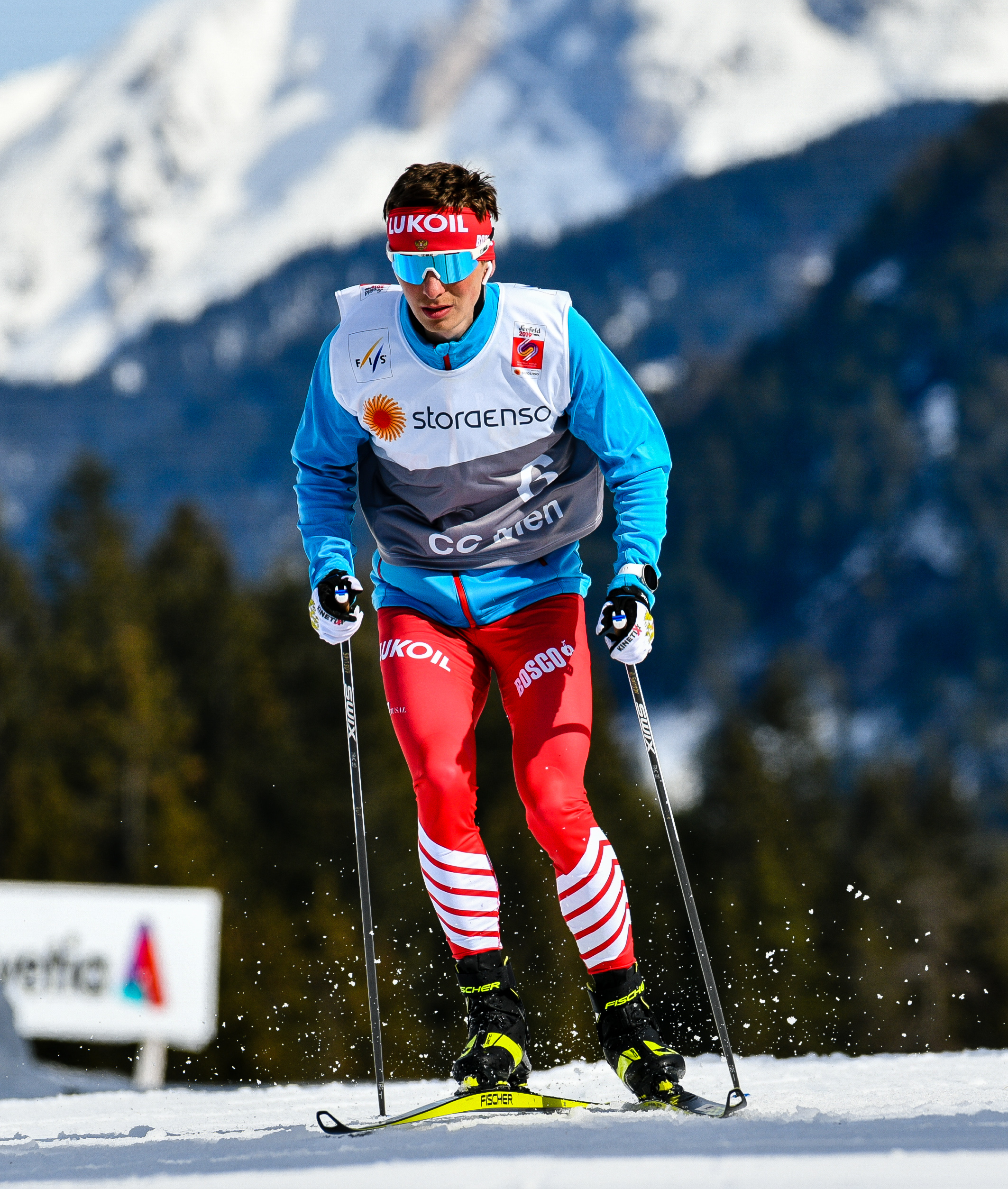
- Spitsov in 2019

Personal information
- Full name: Denis Sergeyevich Spitsov
- Nationality: Russia
- Born: 16 August 1996 (age 29) Vozhega, Vologda Oblast, Russia
- Height: 172 cm (5 ft 8 in)

Sport
- Sport: Skiing

World Cup career
- Seasons: 5 – (2018–2022)
- Indiv. starts: 72
- Indiv. podiums: 6
- Indiv. wins: 1
- Team starts: 6
- Team podiums: 4
- Team wins: 1
- Overall titles: 0 – (9th in 2021)
Medal record
Men's cross-country skiing
International nordic ski competitions
Event	1st	2nd	3rd
Olympic Games	1	3	1
Total	1	3	1
Representing ROC
Olympic Games
Gold medal – first place	2022 Beijing	4 × 10 km relay
Silver medal – second place	2022 Beijing	30 km skiathlon
Representing Olympic Athletes from Russia
Olympic Games
Silver medal – second place	2018 Pyeongchang	4 × 10 km relay
Silver medal – second place	2018 Pyeongchang	Team sprint
Bronze medal – third place	2018 Pyeongchang	15 km freestyle
Representing Russia
U23 World Championships
Gold medal – first place	2018 Goms	30 km skiathlon
Silver medal – second place	2018 Goms	15 km classical
Bronze medal – third place	2017 Park City	15 km freestyle
Bronze medal – third place	2017 Park City	30 km skiathlon
Junior World Championships
Gold medal – first place	2015 Almaty	4 × 5 km relay
Silver medal – second place	2015 Almaty	10 km freestyle
Silver medal – second place	2016 Râșnov	4 × 5 km relay
Bronze medal – third place	2015 Almaty	20 km skiathlon
Bronze medal – third place	2016 Râșnov	15 km freestyle
Military World Games
Silver medal – second place	2017 Sochi	15 km freestyle team
- Updated on 23 March 2023

Denis Sergeyevich Spitsov (Russian: Денис Сергеевич Спицов; born 16 August 1996) is a Russian cross-country skier who competes internationally.

Spitsov debuted in the World Cup in Davos, Switzerland, on 9 December 2017. He participated at the 2018 Winter Olympics, where he won a bronze medal in 15 km interval race, two silver medals in team sprint (with Alexander Bolshunov) and men's relay. Spitsov also finished fourth in 30 km skiathlon.

== Cross-country skiing results ==
All results are sourced from the International Ski Federation (FIS).

=== Olympic Games ===
- 5 medals – (1 gold, 3 silver, 1 bronze)

Year	Age	15 km individual	30 km skiathlon	50 km mass start	Sprint	4 × 10 km relay	Team sprint
2018	21	Bronze	4	20	—	Silver	Silver
2022	25	—	Silver	6^{[a]}	—	Gold	—

^{a} Distance reduced to 30 km due to weather conditions.

=== World Championships ===
Year	Age	15 km individual	30 km skiathlon	50 km mass start	Sprint	4 × 10 km relay	Team sprint
2019	22	—	22	28	—	—	—

=== World Cup ===
==== Season standings ====
Season	Age	Discipline standings				Ski Tour standings			
Season	Age	Overall	Distance	Sprint	U23	Nordic Opening	Tour de Ski	Ski Tour 2020	World Cup Final
2018	21	20	15	NC	4	—	13	—N/a	10
2019	22	18	16	62	3rd place, bronze medalist(s)	27	8	—N/a	37
2020	23	15	16	30	—N/a	—	11	21	—N/a
2021	24	9	4	NC	—N/a	—	3rd place, bronze medalist(s)	—N/a	—N/a
2022 (Note: On 1 March 2022, following the 2022 Russian invasion of Ukraine, FIS decided not to allow athletes from Russian and Belarus to take part in FIS competitions, with an immediate effect.)	25	14	13	NC	—N/a	—N/a	4	—N/a	—N/a

==== Individual podiums ====
- 1 victory – (1 SWC)
- 6 podiums – (1 WC, 5 SWC)

No.	Season	Date	Location	Race	Level	Place
1	2017–18	7 January 2018	Val di Fiemme, Italy	9 km Pursuit F	Stage World Cup	3rd
2	2018–19	1 December 2018	Lillehammer, Norway	15 km Individual F	Stage World Cup	3rd
3	2020–21	5 January 2021	Toblach, Italy	15 km Individual F	Stage World Cup	2nd
4	2020–21	10 January 2021	Val di Fiemme, Italy	10 km Mass Start F	Stage World Cup	1st
5	2020–21	1–10 January 2021	(Switzerland) (Italy) Tour de Ski	Overall Standings	World Cup	3rd
6	2021–22	4 January 2022	Val di Fiemme, Italy	10 km Mass Start F	Stage World Cup	2nd

==== Team podiums ====
- 1 victory – (1 RL)
- 4 podiums – (4 RL)

No.	Season	Date	Location	Race	Level	Place	Teammates
1	2018–19	9 December 2018	Beitostølen, Norway	4 × 7.5 km Relay C/F	World Cup	2nd	Belov / Bolshunov / Melnichenko
2	2018–19	27 January 2019	Ulricehamn, Sweden	4 × 7.5 km Relay C/F	World Cup	1st	Belov / Bessmertnykh / Maltsev
3	2019–20	8 December 2019	Lillehammer, Norway	4 × 7.5 km Relay C/F	World Cup	2nd	Larkov / Semikov / Melnichenko
4	2019–20	1 March 2020	Lahti, Finland	4 × 7.5 km Relay C/F	World Cup	3rd	Semikov / Bessmertnykh / Melnichenko

== Personal life ==
On 10 February 2022, Spitsov, who was previously senior lieutenant, received the rank of captain by the National Guard of Russia.
