= Alexander Bessmertnykh (skier) =

Russian cross-country skier

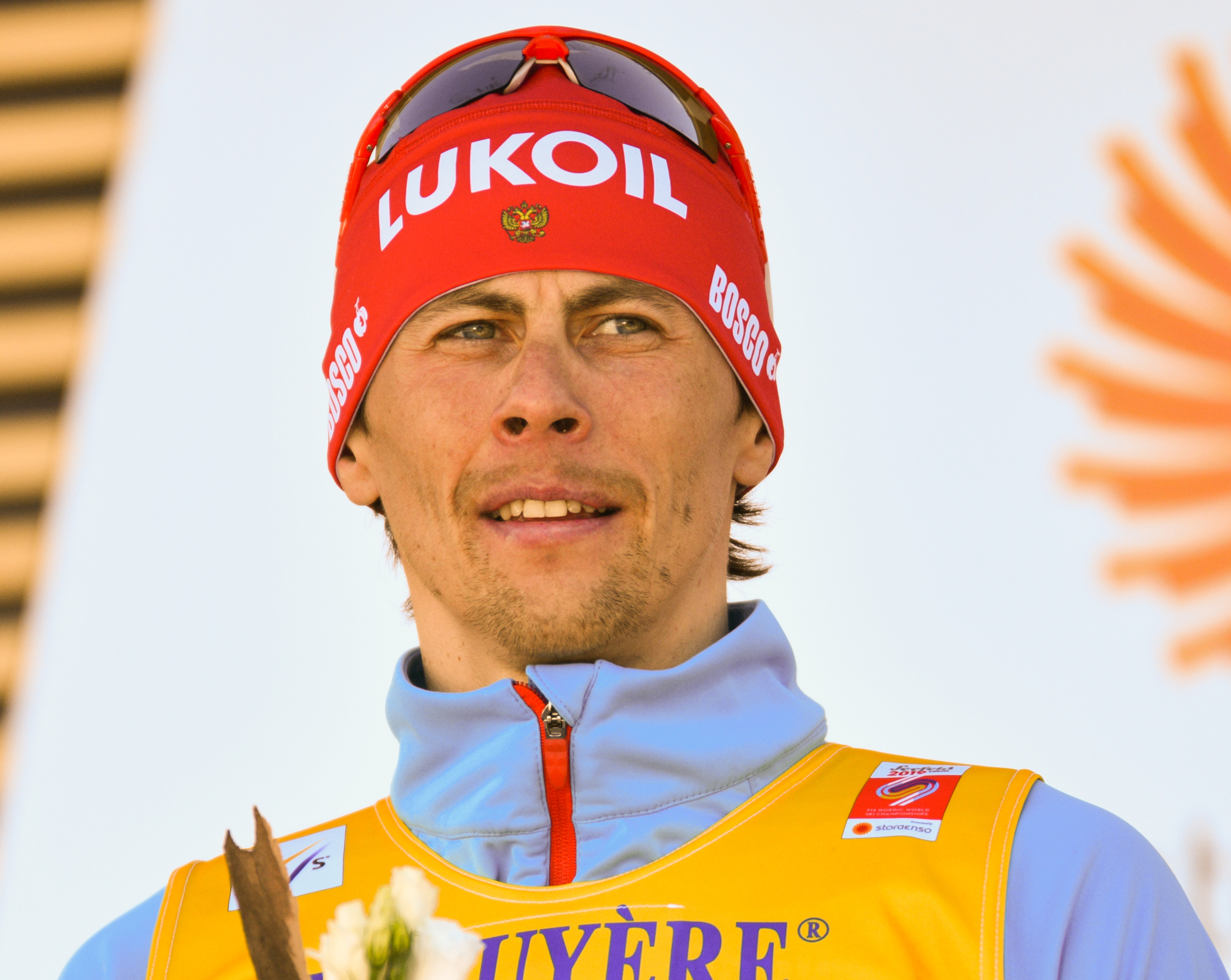
- Bessmertnykh in February, 2019

Personal information
- Full name: Alexander Andreyevich Bessmertnykh
- Nationality: Russia
- Born: 15 September 1986 (age 39) Beryozovsky, Kemerovo Oblast, Soviet Union
- Height: 1.82 m (6 ft 0 in)

Sport
- Sport: Skiing

World Cup career
- Seasons: 12 – (2009, 2011–2020, 2022)
- Indiv. starts: 141
- Indiv. podiums: 6
- Indiv. wins: 0
- Team starts: 8
- Team podiums: 3
- Team wins: 2
- Overall titles: 0 – (15th in 2017)
- Discipline titles: 0
Medal record
Men's cross-country skiing
Representing Russia
Olympic Games
Silver medal – second place	2014 Sochi	4 × 10 km relay
World Championships
Silver medal – second place	2017 Lahti	4 × 10 km relay
Silver medal – second place	2019 Seefeld	15 km classical
Silver medal – second place	2019 Seefeld	4 × 10 km relay
U23 World Championships
Silver medal – second place	2009 Praz de Lys-Sommand	30 km skiathlon
Bronze medal – third place	2009 Praz de Lys-Sommand	15 km freestyle
- Updated on 23 March 2022

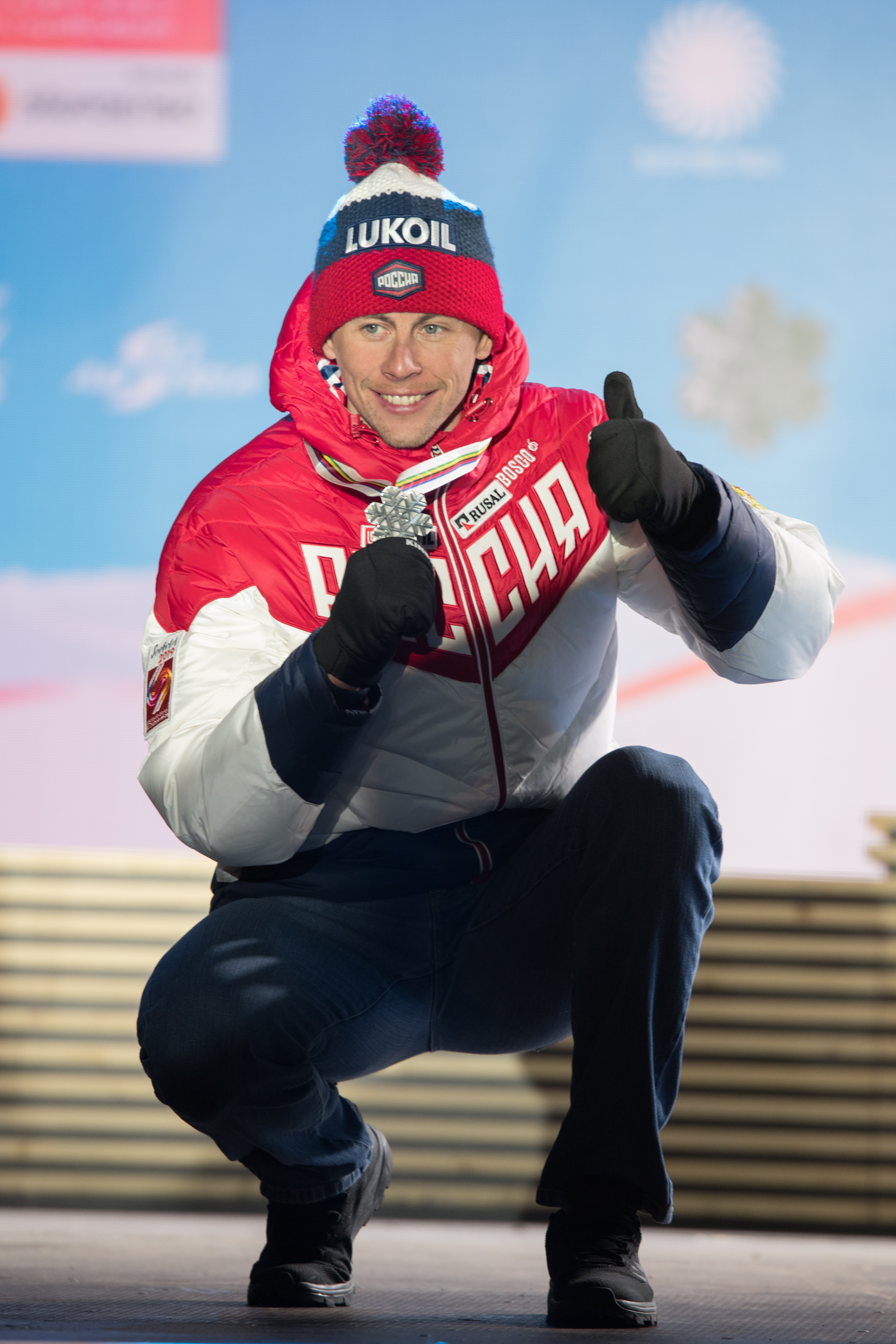
Alexander Bessmertnykh on the podium in 2019

Alexander Andreyevich Bessmertnykh (Russian: Александр Андреевич Бессмертных, born 15 September 1986) is a Russian cross-country skier. In December 2017, he was one of eleven Russian athletes who were banned for life from the Olympics by the International Olympic Committee, as a result of doping offences at the 2014 Winter Olympics.

== Career ==
He represented Russia at the 2014 Winter Olympics in Sochi. On 16 February he ran the second (classical) leg in the men's team relay, together with his teammates Dmitry Yaparov, Alexander Legkov, and Maxim Vylegzhanin, and originally won a silver medal. In December 2017, he was one of eleven Russian athletes who were banned for life from the Olympics by the International Olympic Committee, after doping offences at the 2014 Winter Olympics. Bessmertnykh's results from the 2014 Winter Olympics were annulled. On 1 February 2018, the results were restored as a result of the successful appeal.

== Cross-country skiing results ==
All results are sourced from the International Ski Federation (FIS).

=== Olympic Games ===
- 1 medal – (1 silver)

Year	Age	15 km individual	30 km skiathlon	50 km mass start	Sprint	4 × 10 km relay	Team sprint
2014	27	7	—	—	—	Silver	—

=== World Championships ===
- 3 medals – (3 silver)

Year	Age	15 km individual	30 km skiathlon	50 km mass start	Sprint	4 × 10 km relay	Team sprint
2013	26	—	—	23	—	—	—
2015	28	—	—	10	—	4	—
2017	30	4	17	—	—	Silver	—
2019	32	Silver	—	—	—	Silver	—

=== World Cup ===
==== Season standings ====
Season	Age	Discipline standings			Ski Tour standings				
Season	Age	Overall	Distance	Sprint	Nordic Opening	Tour de Ski	Ski Tour 2020	World Cup Final	Ski Tour Canada
2009	22	178	112	—	—N/a	—	—N/a	—	—N/a
2011	24	70	47	NC	—	25	—N/a	—	—N/a
2012	25	55	39	95	45	25	—N/a	—	—N/a
2013	26	30	17	NC	—	20	—N/a	44	—N/a
2014	27	49	37	79	10	—	—N/a	36	—N/a
2015	28	28	20	NC	61	18	—N/a	—N/a	—N/a
2016	29	19	18	69	29	24	—N/a	—N/a	13
2017	30	15	11	62	28	13	—N/a	14	—N/a
2018	31	37	27	NC	22	—	—N/a	21	—N/a
2019	32	46	27	NC	—	33	—N/a	—	—N/a
2020	33	60	40	—	—	—	—	—N/a	—N/a
2022 (Note: On 1 March 2022, following the 2022 Russian invasion of Ukraine, FIS decided to not allow athletes from Russian and Belarus to take part in FIS competitions, with an immediate effect.)	35	157	95	—	—N/a	—	—N/a	—N/a	—N/a

==== Individual podiums ====
- 6 podiums – (5 WC, 1 SWC)

No.	Season	Date	Location	Race	Level	Place
1	2012–13	19 January 2013	La Clusaz, France	15 km Mass Start C	World Cup	2nd
2	2015–16	20 December 2015	Toblach, Italy	15 km Individual C	World Cup	2nd
3	2015–16	13 February 2016	Falun, Sweden	10 km Individual C	World Cup	2nd
4	2016–17	11 March 2017	Oslo, Norway	50 km Mass Start C	World Cup	3rd
5	2016–17	18 March 2017	Quebec City, Canada	15 km Mass Start C	Stage World Cup	3rd
6	2018–19	17 February 2019	Cogne, Italy	15 km Individual C	World Cup	3rd

==== Team podiums ====
- 2 victories – (2 RL)
- 3 podiums – (3 RL)

No.	Season	Date	Location	Race	Level	Place	Teammates
1	2013–14	8 December 2013	Lillehammer, Norway	4 × 7.5 km Relay C/F	World Cup	1st	Yaparov / Legkov / Vylegzhanin
2	2018–19	27 January 2019	Ulricehamn, Sweden	4 × 7.5 km Relay C/F	World Cup	1st	Belov / Spitsov / Maltsev
3	2019–20	1 March 2020	Lahti, Finland	4 × 7.5 km Relay C/F	World Cup	3rd	Semikov / Spitsov / Melnichenko
