= Andrey Melnichenko (skier) =

Russian cross-country skier

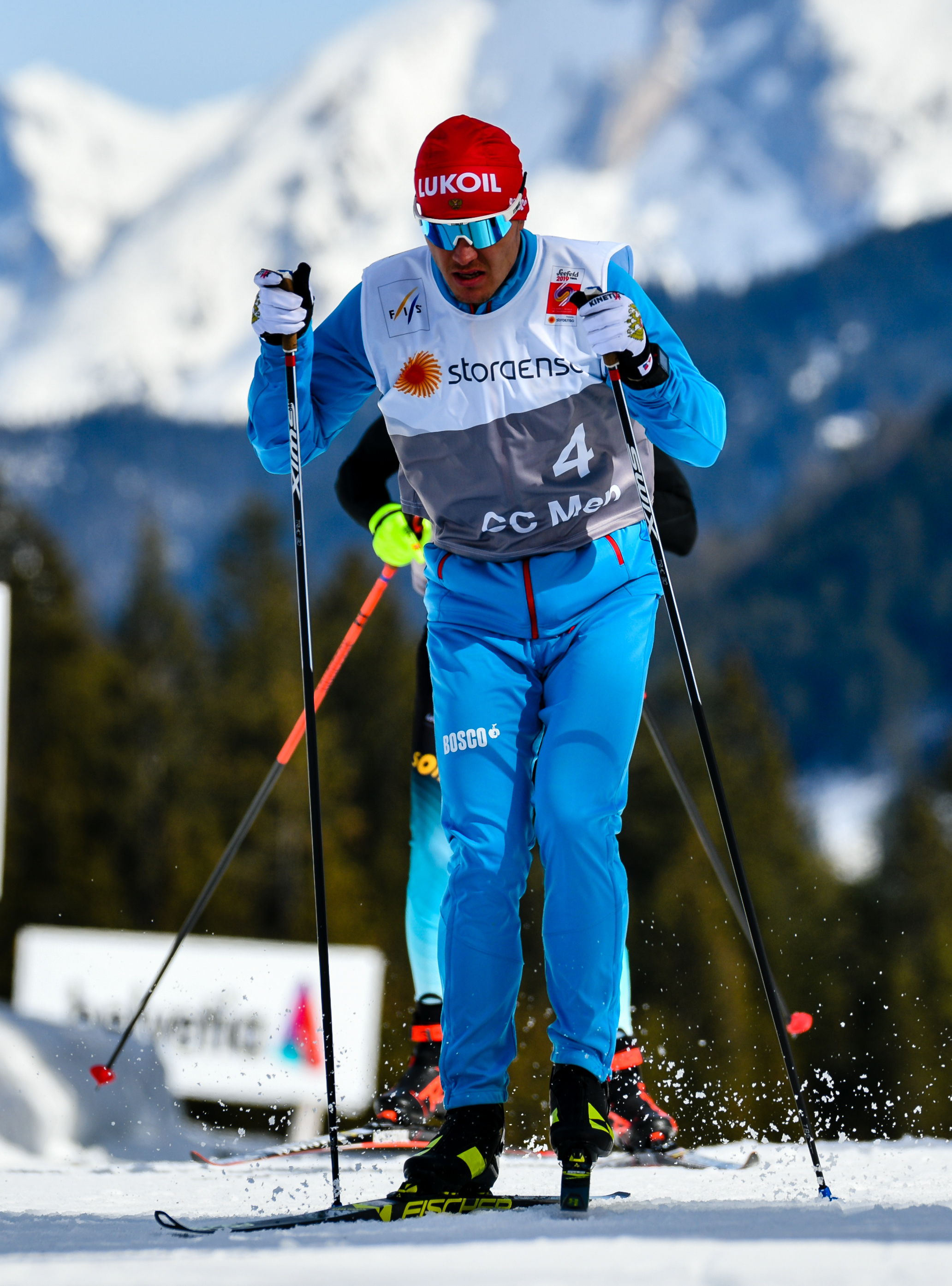
- Melnichenko in March 2019

Personal information
- Nationality: Russia
- Born: 21 May 1992 (age 34) Krasnoyarsk, Russia

Sport
- Sport: Skiing

World Cup career
- Seasons: 7 – (2016–present)
- Indiv. starts: 85
- Indiv. podiums: 4
- Indiv. wins: 0
- Team starts: 8
- Team podiums: 5
- Team wins: 0
- Overall titles: 0 –(8th in 2021)
- Discipline titles: 0
- Updated on 23 March 2022

Andrey Leonidovich Melnichenko (Russian: Андрей Леонидович Мельниченко; born 21 May 1992) is a Russian cross-country skier who competes internationally.

He participated at the 2018 Winter Olympics.

== Cross-country skiing results ==
All results are sourced from the International Ski Federation (FIS).

=== Olympic Games ===
Year	Age	15 km individual	30 km skiathlon	50 km mass start	Sprint	4 × 10 km relay	Team sprint
2018	25	14	29	—	59	—	—

=== World Championships ===
Year	Age	15 km individual	30 km skiathlon	50 km mass start	Sprint	4 × 10 km relay	Team sprint
2017	24	—	—	28	—	—	—
2019	26	—	13	13	—	—	—
2021	28	12	—	—	—	—	—

=== World Cup ===
==== Season standings ====
Season	Age	Discipline standings			Ski Tour standings				
Season	Age	Overall	Distance	Sprint	Nordic Opening	Tour de Ski	Ski Tour 2020	World Cup Final	Ski Tour Canada
2016	23	128	77	—	—	—	—N/a	—N/a	—
2017	24	91	68	NC	—	27	—N/a	—	—N/a
2018	25	61	69	78	—	19	—N/a	—	—N/a
2019	26	14	8	45	21	6	—N/a	18	—N/a
2020	27	11	11	32	22	8	14	—N/a	—N/a
2021	28	8	8	27	9	7	—N/a	—N/a	—N/a
2022 (Note: On 1 March 2022, following the 2022 Russian invasion of Ukraine, FIS decided to not allow athletes from Russian and Belarus to take part in FIS competitions, with an immediate effect.)	29	49	38	NC	—N/a	23	—N/a	—N/a	—N/a

==== Individual podiums ====
- 4 podiums – (2 WC, 2 SWC)

No.	Season	Date	Location	Race	Level	Place
1	2018–19	8 December 2018	Beitostølen, Norway	30 km Individual F	World Cup	3rd
2	2018–19	6 January 2019	Val di Fiemme, Italy	9 km Pursuit F	Stage World Cup	3rd
3	2020–21	29 November 2020	Rukatunturi, Finland	15 km Pursuit F	Stage World Cup	2nd
4	2020–21	13 December 2020	Davos, Switzerland	15 km Individual F	World Cup	2nd

==== Team podiums ====
- 5 podiums – (5 RL)

No.	Season	Date	Location	Race	Level	Place	Teammates
1	2018–19	9 December 2018	Beitostølen, Norway	4 × 7.5 km Relay C/F	World Cup	2nd	Belov / Bolshunov / Spitsov
2	2018–19	27 January 2019	Ulricehamn, Sweden	4 × 7.5 km Relay C/F	World Cup	2nd	Larkov / Bolshunov / Ustiugov
3	2019–20	8 December 2019	Lillehammer, Norway	4 × 7.5 km Relay C/F	World Cup	2nd	Larkov / Semikov / Spitsov
4	2019–20	1 March 2020	Lahti, Finland	4 × 7.5 km Relay C/F	World Cup	3rd	Semikov / Bessmertnykh / Spitsov
5	2020–21	24 January 2021	Lahti, Finland	4 × 7.5 km Relay C/F	World Cup	3rd	Semikov / Yakimushkin / Ustiugov
