= FIS Nordic World Ski Championships 2019 – Men's 15 kilometre classical =

Men's 15 kilometre classical at the FIS Nordic World Ski Championships 2019
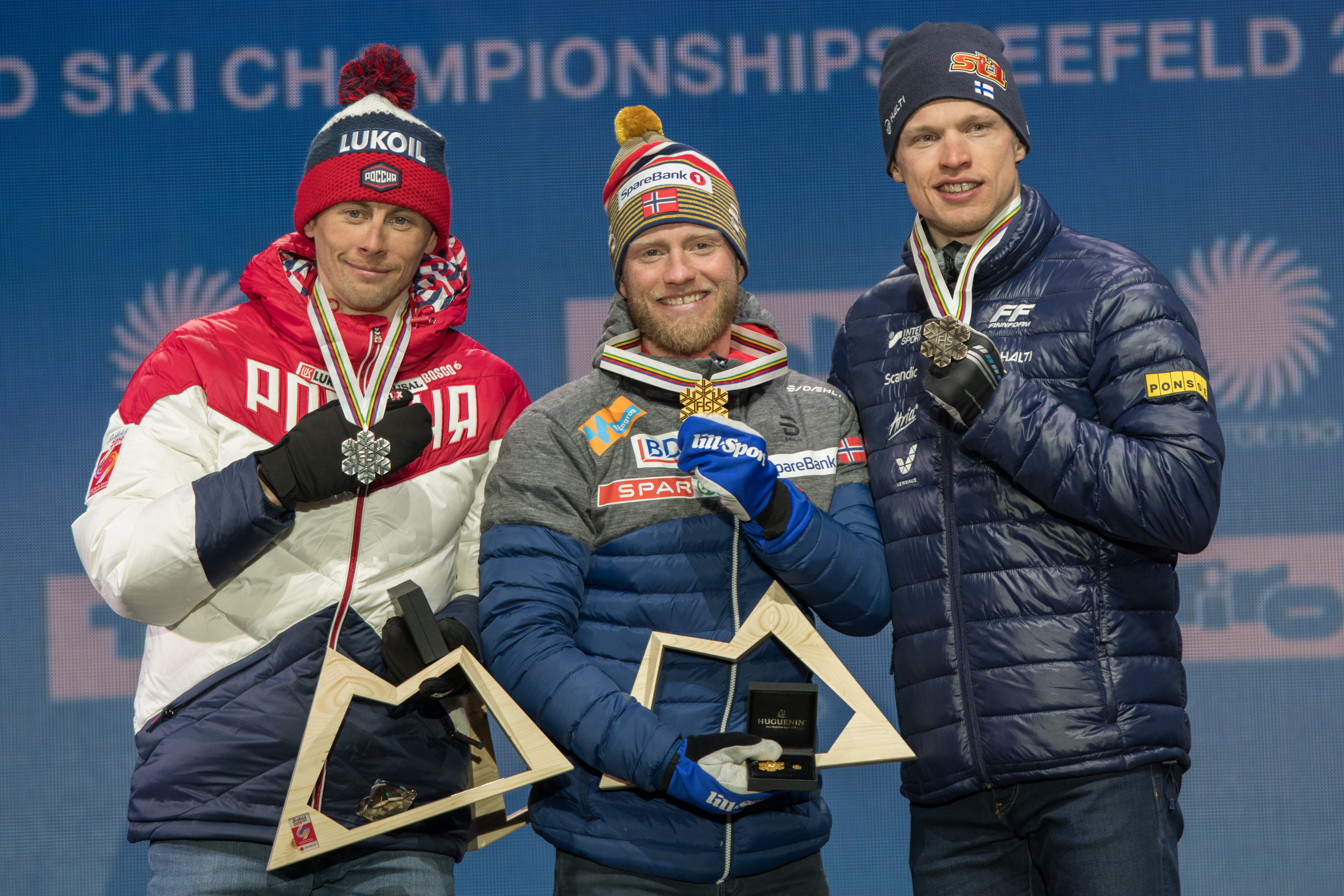
- Location: Seefeld in Tirol, Austria
- Dates: 20, 27 February
- Competitors: 89 from 36 nations
- Winning time: 38:22.6

Medalists
gold medal	Martin Johnsrud Sundby	Norway
silver medal	Alexander Bessmertnykh	Russia
bronze medal	Iivo Niskanen	Finland

The Men's 15 kilometre classical competition at the FIS Nordic World Ski Championships 2019 was held on 20 and 27 February 2019. A qualification was held on 20 February.

== Results ==
=== Qualification ===
The qualification was started on 20 February at 14:00.

Rank	Bib	Athlete	Country	Time	Deficit	Notes
1	53	Thibaut De Marre	Belgium	27:56.7		Q
2	51	Mark Chanloung	Thailand	28:09.8	+13.1	Q
3	49	Albert Jónsson	Iceland	28:25.2	+28.5	Q
4	41	Marco Dal Farra	Argentina	28:45.1	+48.4	Q
5	46	Ádám Kónya	Hungary	28:55.5	+58.8	Q
6	43	Dagur Benediktsson	Iceland	29:05.6	+1:08.9	Q
7	45	Todor Malchov	Bulgaria	29:23.7	+1:27.0	Q
8	48	Franco Dal Farra	Argentina	29:35.9	+1:39.2	Q
9	54	Sattar Seid	Iran	29:43.3	+1:46.6	Q
10	32	Batmönkhiin Achbadrakh	Mongolia	29:45.3	+1:48.6	Q
11	37	Tue Rømer	Denmark	29:46.2	+1:49.5	
12	56	Dmytro Drahun	Ukraine	29:46.9	+1:50.2	
13	17	Joachim Weel Rosbo	Denmark	30:16.8	+2:20.1	
14	55	Tautvydas Strolia	Lithuania	30:17.8	+2:21.1	
15	42	Marko Skender	Croatia	30:36.9	+2:40.2	
16	52	Mihailo Škipina	Bosnia and Herzegovina	30:39.1	+2:42.4	
17	50	Matías Zuloaga	Argentina	30:40.2	+2:43.5	
18	40	Victor Santos	Brazil	30:59.7	+3:03.0	
19	28	Kristóf Lagler	Hungary	31:20.3	+3:23.6	
20	35	Jakov Hladika	Croatia	31:21.8	+3:25.1	
21	18	Soninbayaryn Düürenbayar	Mongolia	31:40.3	+3:43.6	
22	23	Titouan Serot	Belgium	31:41.1	+3:44.4	
23	44	Aleksandar Ognyanov	Bulgaria	32:06.4	+4:09.7	
24	39	Juan Agurto	Chile	32:14.3	+4:17.6	
25	58	Miloš Čolić	Bosnia and Herzegovina	32:16.1	+4:19.4	
26	20	Jacob Weel Rosbo	Denmark	32:16.9	+4:20.2	
26	34	Myasnik Gharibyan	Armenia	32:16.9	+4:20.2	
28	3	Dashdondogiin Mönkhgerel	Mongolia	32:17.8	+4:21.1	
29	27	Timo Juhani Grönlund	Bolivia	32:36.7	+4:40.0	
30	57	Miloš Milosavljević	Serbia	32:41.4	+4:44.7	
31	31	Yasin Shemshaki	Iran	32:41.5	+4:44.8	
32	21	Jan Rossiter	Ireland	32:41.9	+4:45.2	
33	26	Georgios Nakas	Greece	32:42.1	+4:45.4	
34	33	Yaghoob Kiashemshaki	Iran	33:01.5	+5:04.8	
35	36	Yuri Rocha	Brazil	33:12.6	+5:15.9	
36	24	Tucker Murphy	Bermuda	33:26.4	+5:29.7	
37	19	Rokas Vaitkus	Lithuania	34:05.7	+6:09.0	
38	11	Stephan Langer	Belgium	34:59.4	+7:02.7	
39	4	Tariel Zharkymbaev	Kyrgyzstan	35:01.7	+7:05.0	
40	9	Klaus Jungbluth Rodríguez	Ecuador	35:16.4	+7:19.7	
41	12	André Gonçalves	Portugal	35:25.4	+7:28.7	
42	38	Samer Tawk	Lebanon	35:27.1	+7:30.4	
43	16	Roni Aleksander Zein	Lebanon	35:34.4	+7:37.7	
44	13	Filipe Cabrita	Portugal	35:57.3	+8:00.6	
45	29	Paulius Januškevičius	Lithuania	36:19.0	+8:22.3	
46	30	Aleksander Grbović	Montenegro	36:22.9	+8:26.2	
47	25	Reza Rajabbloukat	Iran	36:37.5	+8:40.8	
48	2	Andrew Theall	Colombia	37:17.5	+9:20.8	
49	14	Peter Jensen	Denmark	38:26.2	+10:29.5	
50	7	Andreas Razafimahatratra	Madagascar	39:04.2	+11:07.5	
51	8	Juan Carlos Avilés	Mexico	39:16.3	+11:19.6	
52	15	Antonio Pineyro	Mexico	40:55.6	+12:58.9	
53	1	Luis Carrasco	Mexico	43:17.7	+15:21.0	
54	5	Germán Madrazo	Mexico	43:32.5	+15:35.8	
55	10	Mark Rajack	Trinidad and Tobago	44:13.0	+16:16.3	
56	6	Sebastián Uprimny	Colombia	46:02.3	+18:05.6	
—	47	Kari Peters	Luxembourg	Did not finish		
—	22	Nicolae Gaiduc	Moldova	Did not start		

=== Final ===
The final was started on 27 February at 14:00.

Rank	Bib	Athlete	Country	Time	Deficit
1st place, gold medalist(s)	68	Martin Johnsrud Sundby	Norway	38:22.6	
2nd place, silver medalist(s)	62	Alexander Bessmertnykh	Russia	38:25.5	+2.9
3rd place, bronze medalist(s)	46	Iivo Niskanen	Finland	38:43.0	+20.4
4	64	Andrey Larkov	Russia	38:45.4	+22.8
5	44	Didrik Tønseth	Norway	38:46.9	+24.3
6	56	Dario Cologna	Switzerland	38:55.0	+32.4
7	70	Sjur Røthe	Norway	38:56.5	+33.9
8	42	Alexander Bolshunov	Russia	39:21.1	+58.5
8	54	Andrew Musgrave	Great Britain	39:21.1	+58.5
10	52	Emil Iversen	Norway	39:23.1	+1:00.5
11	36	Jens Burman	Sweden	39:45.8	+1:23.2
12	58	Viktor Thorn	Sweden	39:51.6	+1:29.0
13	15	Andreas Katz	Germany	39:59.6	+1:37.0
14	21	Jonas Baumann	Switzerland	40:04.7	+1:42.1
15	16	Sebastian Eisenlauer	Germany	40:07.4	+1:44.8
16	50	Calle Halfvarsson	Sweden	40:12.4	+1:49.8
17	31	Erik Bjornsen	United States	40:12.9	+1:50.3
18	37	Janosch Brugger	Germany	40:14.2	+1:51.6
19	24	Perttu Hyvärinen	Finland	40:16.8	+1:54.2
20	66	Francesco De Fabiani	Italy	40:20.3	+1:57.7
21	39	Daniel Rickardsson	Sweden	40:21.8	+1:59.2
22	29	Irineu Esteve Altimiras	Andorra	40:30.2	+2:07.6
23	22	Ueli Schnider	Switzerland	40:31.6	+2:09.0
24	35	Jules Lapierre	France	40:39.8	+2:17.2
25	48	Maurice Manificat	France	40:43.3	+2:20.7
26	20	Hiroyuki Miyazawa	Japan	40:44.8	+2:22.2
26	34	Lucas Bögl	Germany	40:44.8	+2:22.2
28	26	Naoto Baba	Japan	40:44.9	+2:22.3
29	38	Ristomatti Hakola	Finland	40:50.8	+2:28.2
30	33	Scott Patterson	United States	40:57.3	+2:34.7
31	28	Kyle Bratrud	United States	41:06.4	+2:43.8
32	8	Anssi Pentsinen	Finland	41:11.1	+2:48.5
33	60	Maxim Vylegzhanin	Russia	41:12.6	+2:50.0
34	69	Scott James Hill	Canada	41:23.9	+3:01.3
35	76	Thomas Hjalmar Westgård	Ireland	41:39.5	+3:16.9
36	6	Andrew Young	Great Britain	41:42.6	+3:20.0
37	18	Valentin Chauvin	France	41:46.2	+3:23.6
37	32	Beda Klee	Switzerland	41:46.2	+3:23.6
39	14	Michal Novák	Czech Republic	41:46.3	+3:23.7
40	57	Veselin Tzinzov	Bulgaria	41:46.8	+3:24.2
41	11	Paul Constantin Pepene	Romania	41:51.3	+3:28.7
42	63	Miroslav Rypl	Czech Republic	41:58.8	+3:36.2
43	1	Snorri Einarsson	Iceland	42:01.6	+3:39.0
44	10	Kaichi Naruse	Japan	42:06.3	+3:43.7
45	25	Benjamin Lustgarten	United States	42:12.2	+3:49.6
46	9	Evan Palmer-Charrette	Canada	42:15.3	+3:52.7
47	45	Len Väljas	Canada	42:15.5	+3:52.9
48	59	Imanol Rojo	Spain	42:20.0	+3:57.4
49	55	Adam Fellner	Czech Republic	42:22.0	+3:59.4
50	17	Vitaliy Pukhkalo	Kazakhstan	42:27.8	+4:05.2
51	13	Denis Volotka	Kazakhstan	42:30.5	+4:07.9
52	65	Joni Mäki	Finland	42:34.4	+4:11.8
53	27	Maicol Rastelli	Italy	42:34.5	+4:11.9
54	80	Shang Jincai	China	42:38.4	+4:15.8
55	61	Oleksiy Krasovsky	Ukraine	42:44.8	+4:22.2
56	43	Luis Stadlober	Austria	42:49.6	+4:27.0
57	67	Stefan Zelger	Italy	42:56.9	+4:34.3
58	41	Benjamin Črv	Slovenia	42:57.2	+4:34.6
59	72	Maciej Staręga	Poland	43:14.5	+4:51.9
60	12	Olzhas Klimin	Kazakhstan	43:17.2	+4:54.6
61	4	Jan Kořístek	Slovakia	43:20.4	+4:57.8
62	19	Dominik Bury	Poland	43:21.3	+4:58.7
63	74	Martin Vögeli	Liechtenstein	43:24.9	+5:02.3
64	53	Aliaksandr Voranau	Belarus	43:29.8	+5:07.2
65	77	Bao Lin	China	43:32.3	+5:09.7
66	7	Petr Knop	Czech Republic	43:35.7	+5:13.1
67	2	Raido Ränkel	Estonia	43:39.7	+5:17.1
68	5	Russell Kennedy	Canada	44:13.4	+5:50.8
69	49	Kamil Bury	Poland	44:27.1	+6:04.5
70	51	Petrică Hogiu	Romania	44:33.5	+6:10.9
71	89	Ádám Kónya	Hungary	44:39.9	+6:17.3
72	78	Wang Qiang	China	44:51.0	+6:28.4
73	79	Martin Penchev	Bulgaria	45:02.8	+6:40.2
74	75	Mikayel Mikayelyan	Armenia	45:09.6	+6:47.0
75	86	Thibaut de Marre	Belgium	45:10.8	+6:48.2
76	91	Seve de Campo	Australia	45:11.6	+6:49.0
77	83	Zhu Mingliang	China	45:18.0	+6:55.4
78	71	Raul Mihai Popa	Romania	45:19.3	+6:56.7
79	47	Martin Himma	Estonia	45:28.9	+7:06.3
80	73	Yan Kostruba	Ukraine	45:42.8	+7:20.2
81	81	Tadevos Poghosyan	Armenia	46:44.1	+8:21.5
82	93	Alex Vanias	Greece	47:28.3	+9:05.7
83	85	Mark Pollock	Australia	47:55.9	+9:33.3
84	88	Albert Jónsson	Iceland	48:21.5	+9:58.9
85	90	Todor Malchov	Bulgaria	48:27.1	+10:04.5
86	84	Sattar Seid	Iran	49:04.5	+10:41.9
87	92	Dagur Benediktsson	Iceland	49:11.9	+10:49.3
–	82	Andrej Segeč	Slovakia	Did not finish	
–	87	Mark Chanloung	Thailand	Did not finish	
–	3	Andreas Veerpalu	Estonia	Did not start	
–	23	Max Hauke	Austria	Did not start	
–	30	Karel Tammjärv	Estonia	Did not start	
–	40	Alexey Poltoranin	Kazakhstan	Did not start	
