= Anssi Pentsinen =

Finnish cross-country skier

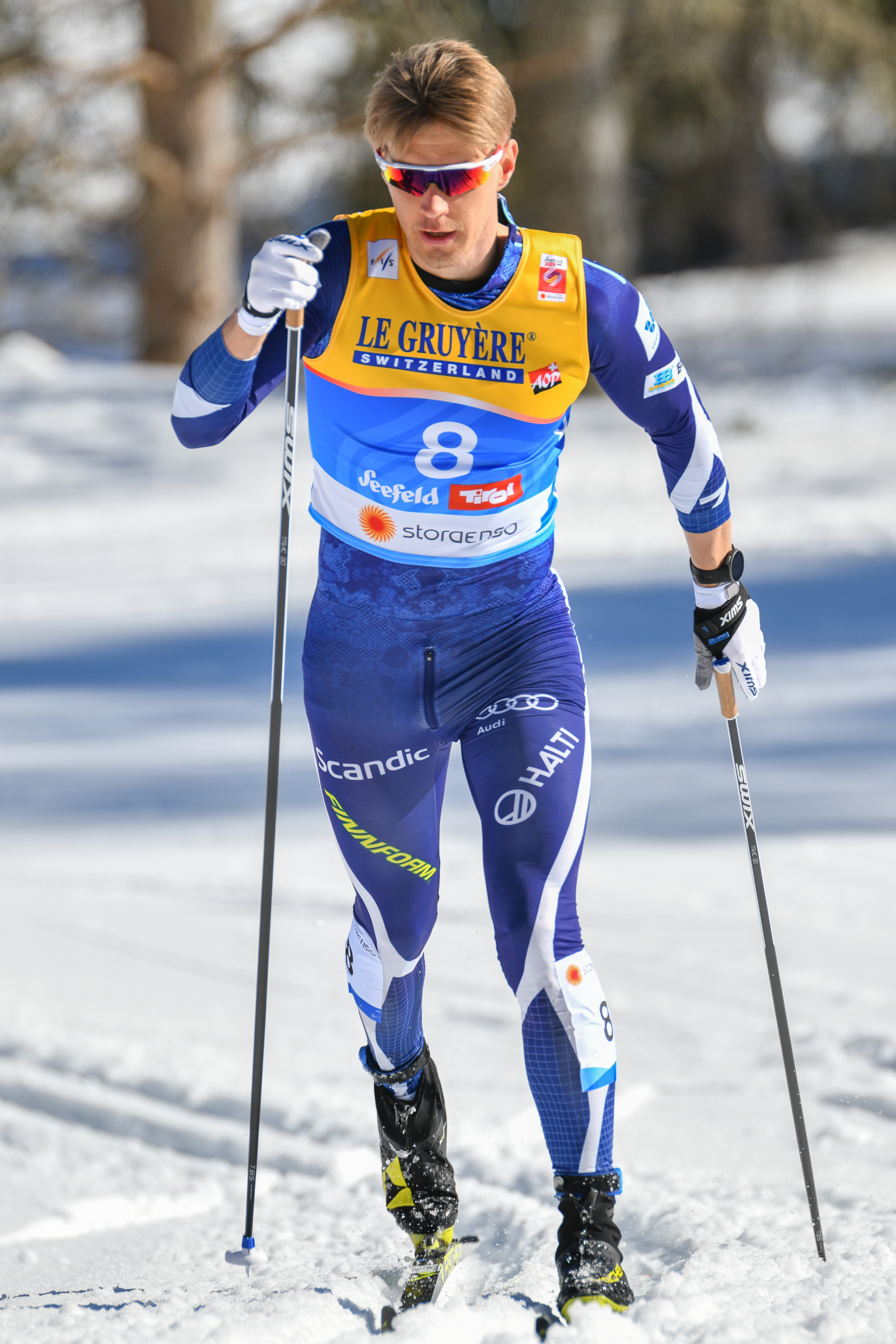

Personal information
- Nationality: Finland
- Born: 30 August 1986 (age 39) Jämsä, Finland

Sport
- Sport: Skiing
- Club: Vantaan Hiihtoseura

World Cup career
- Seasons: 12 – (2008–2019)
- Indiv. starts: 103
- Indiv. podiums: 0
- Team starts: 10
- Team podiums: 0
- Overall titles: 0 – (53rd in 2013)
- Discipline titles: 0
- Updated on 12 April 2019

Anssi Pentsinen (born 30 August 1986 in Jämsä) is a Finnish cross-country skier.

Pentsinen competed at the 2014 Winter Olympics for Finland. He placed 34th in the qualifying round in the sprint, failing to advance to the knockout stages.

As of April 2014, his best showing at the World Championships is 16th, in both the team and individual sprints in 2013.

Pentsinen made his World Cup debut in March 2008. As of April 2014, his best finish is 4th, in a freestyle sprint race at Düsseldorf in 2011–12. His best World Cup overall finish is 53rd, in 2012–13. His best World Cup finish in a discipline is 17th, in the 2012-13 sprint.

== Cross-country skiing results ==
All results are sourced from the International Ski Federation (FIS).

=== Olympic Games ===
Year	Age	15 km individual	30 km skiathlon	50 km mass start	Sprint	4 × 10 km relay	Team sprint
2014	27	—	—	—	34	—	—
2018	31	51	—	—	—	—	—

=== World Championships ===
Year	Age	15 km individual	30 km skiathlon	50 km mass start	Sprint	4 × 10 km relay	Team sprint
2011	24	—	—	—	32	—	—
2013	26	—	48	—	16	—	16
2015	28	—	—	—	22	—	—
2017	30	—	—	—	29	—	—
2019	32	32	—	—	36	—	—

=== World Cup ===
==== Season standings ====
Season	Age	Discipline standings			Ski Tour standings			
Season	Age	Overall	Distance	Sprint	Nordic Opening	Tour de Ski	World Cup Final	Ski Tour Canada
2008	21	NC	—	NC	—N/a	—	—	—N/a
2009	22	NC	—	NC	—N/a	—	—	—N/a
2010	23	NC	NC	NC	—N/a	—	—	—N/a
2011	24	111	NC	64	DNF	—	—	—N/a
2012	25	56	NC	20	38	—	—	—N/a
2013	26	53	NC	17	DNF	—	—	—N/a
2014	27	80	NC	35	DNF	DNF	—	—N/a
2015	28	89	NC	42	—	—	—N/a	—N/a
2016	29	71	93	32	32	47	—N/a	DNF
2017	30	102	—	50	—	—	—	—N/a
2018	31	54	76	26	DNF	—	—	—N/a
2019	32	110	NC	58	56	—	—	—N/a
