= Maicol Rastelli =

Italian cross-country skier

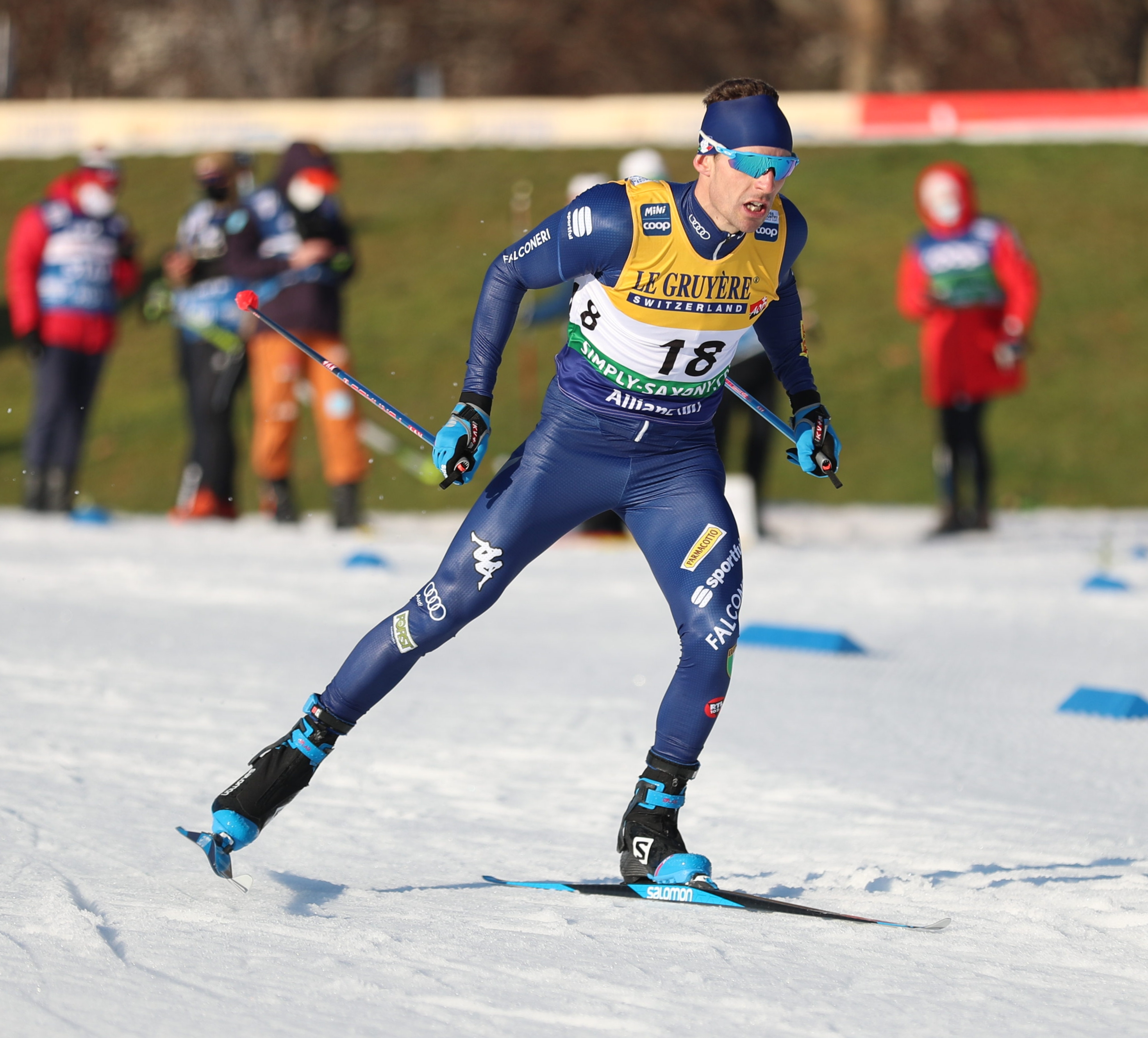
- Rastelli in 2020

Personal information
- Nationality: Italy
- Born: 28 April 1991 (age 35) Sondalo, Italy

Sport
- Sport: Skiing
- Club: C.S. Esercito

World Cup career
- Seasons: 10 – (2013–2022)
- Indiv. starts: 110
- Indiv. podiums: 1
- Indiv. wins: 0
- Team starts: 6
- Team podiums: 0
- Overall titles: 0 – (62nd in 2018)
- Discipline titles: 0
- Updated on 29 March 2023

Maicol Rastelli (born 28 April 1991) is an Italian cross-country skier. He competed in the World Cup 2015 season.

He represented Italy at the FIS Nordic World Ski Championships 2015 in Falun.

== Cross-country skiing results ==
All results are sourced from the International Ski Federation (FIS).

=== Olympic Games ===
Year	Age	15 km individual	30 km skiathlon	50 km mass start	Sprint	4 × 10 km relay	Team sprint
2018	26	—	—	19	26	7	—
2022	30	52	—	—^{[a]}	51	—	—

^{a} Distance reduced to 30 km due to weather conditions.

=== World Championships ===
Year	Age	15 km individual	30 km skiathlon	50 km mass start	Sprint	4 × 10 km relay	Team sprint
2015	23	—	—	—	15	—	—
2019	27	53	—	—	—	10	—
2021	29	—	—	—	27	—	—

=== World Cup ===
==== Season standings ====
Season	Age	Discipline standings			Ski Tour standings				
Season	Age	Overall	Distance	Sprint	Nordic Opening	Tour de Ski	Ski Tour 2020	World Cup Final	Ski Tour Canada
2013	21	NC	—	NC	—	—	—N/a	—	—N/a
2014	22	83	NC	37	—	DNF	—N/a	—	—N/a
2015	23	124	NC	68	84	—	—N/a	—N/a	—N/a
2016	24	94	69	62	59	DNF	—N/a	—N/a	—
2017	25	151	NC	86	64	39	—N/a	—	—N/a
2018	26	62	54	46	77	DNF	—N/a	44	—N/a
2019	27	87	70	56	DNF	DNF	—N/a	42	—N/a
2020	28	77	NC	45	DNF	51	DNF	—N/a	—N/a
2021	29	123	NC	75	56	—	—N/a	—N/a	—N/a
2022	30	91	73	75	—N/a	32	—N/a	—N/a	—N/a

==== Individual podiums ====
- 1 podium – (1 WC)

No.	Season	Date	Location	Race	Level	Place
1	2013–14	5 March 2014	Drammen, Norway	1.3 km Sprint C	World Cup	3rd
