= Ueli Schnider =

Swiss cross-country skier

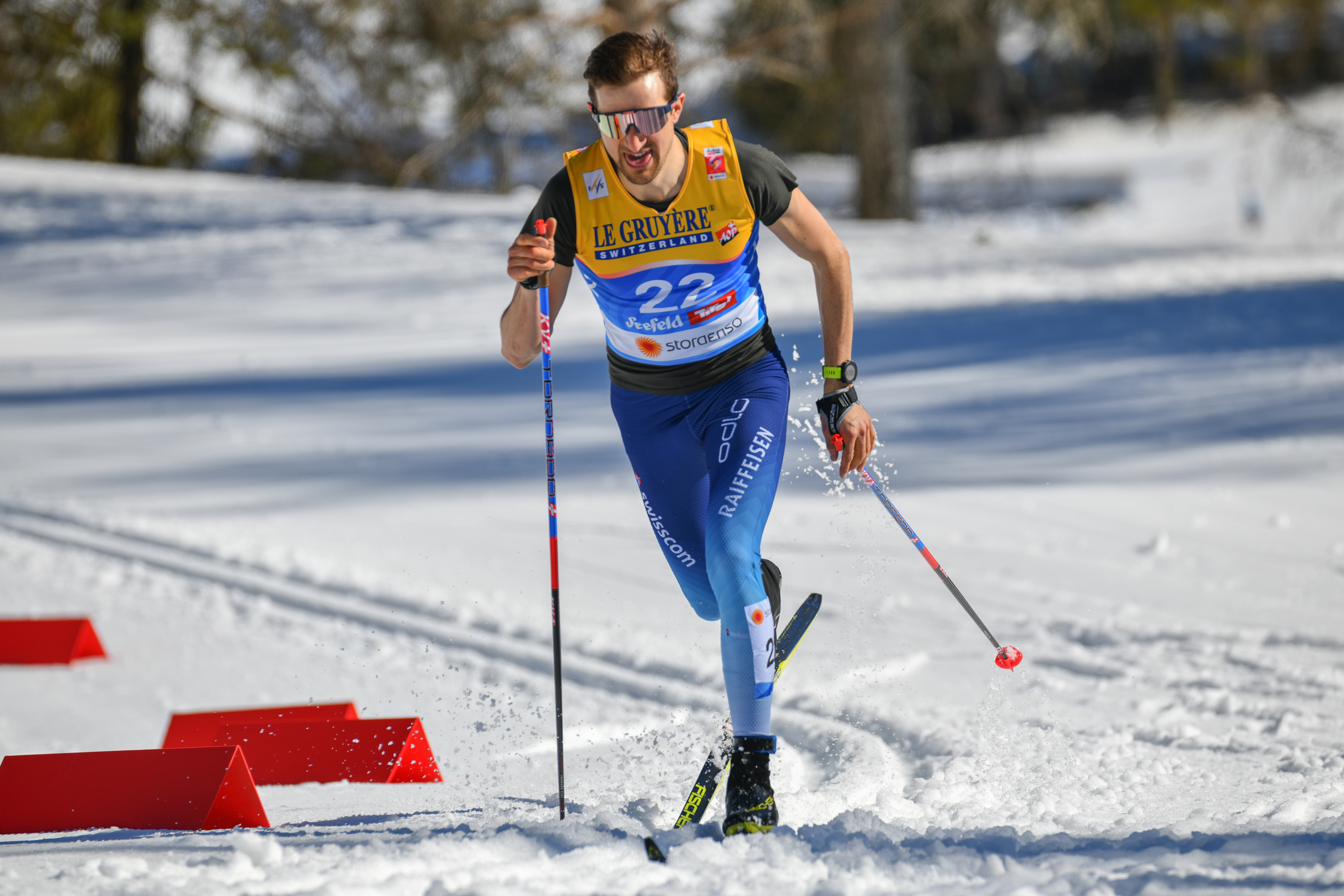
- Schnider in February 2019

Personal information
- Nationality: Switzerland
- Born: 29 March 1990 (age 36)

Sport
- Sport: Skiing
- Club: Gardes Frontiere

World Cup career
- Seasons: 11 – (2011–2021)
- Indiv. starts: 62
- Indiv. podiums: 0
- Team starts: 5
- Team podiums: 0
- Overall titles: 0 – (99th in 2015)
- Discipline titles: 0
- Updated on 19 March 2022

Ueli Schnider (born 29 March 1990) is a Swiss cross-country skier. He competed in the World Cup 2015 season.

He represented Switzerland at the FIS Nordic World Ski Championships 2015 in Falun.

== Cross-country skiing results ==
All results are sourced from the International Ski Federation (FIS).

=== Olympic Games ===
Year	Age	15 km individual	30 km skiathlon	50 km mass start	Sprint	4 × 10 km relay	Team sprint
2018	27	—	—	45	40	—	—

=== World Championships ===
Year	Age	15 km individual	30 km skiathlon	50 km mass start	Sprint	4× 10 km relay	Team sprint
2013	22	—	—	—	47	—	—
2015	24	—	—	—	8	5	—
2019	28	23	—	—	—	8	11

=== World Cup ===
==== Season standings ====
Season	Age	Discipline standings			Ski Tour standings				
Season	Age	Overall	Distance	Sprint	Nordic Opening	Tour de Ski	Ski Tour 2020	World Cup Final	Ski Tour Canada
2011	21	NC	NC	—	—	—	—N/a	—	—N/a
2012	22	NC	NC	NC	—	—	—N/a	—	—N/a
2013	23	148	—	90	—	—	—N/a	—	—N/a
2014	24	141	NC	87	—	—	—N/a	—	—N/a
2015	25	99	83	52	—	DNF	—N/a	—N/a	—N/a
2016	26	123	81	94	78	DNF	—N/a	—N/a	—
2017	27	129	85	—	—	—	—N/a	—	—N/a
2018	28	117	79	NC	—	—	—N/a	—	—N/a
2019	29	105	68	NC	—	—	—N/a	—	—N/a
2020	30	111	NC	76	DNF	33	—	—N/a	—N/a
2021	31	NC	NC	NC	—	—	—N/a	—N/a	—N/a
