= Victor Santos (skier) =

Brazilian cross-country skier (born 1997)

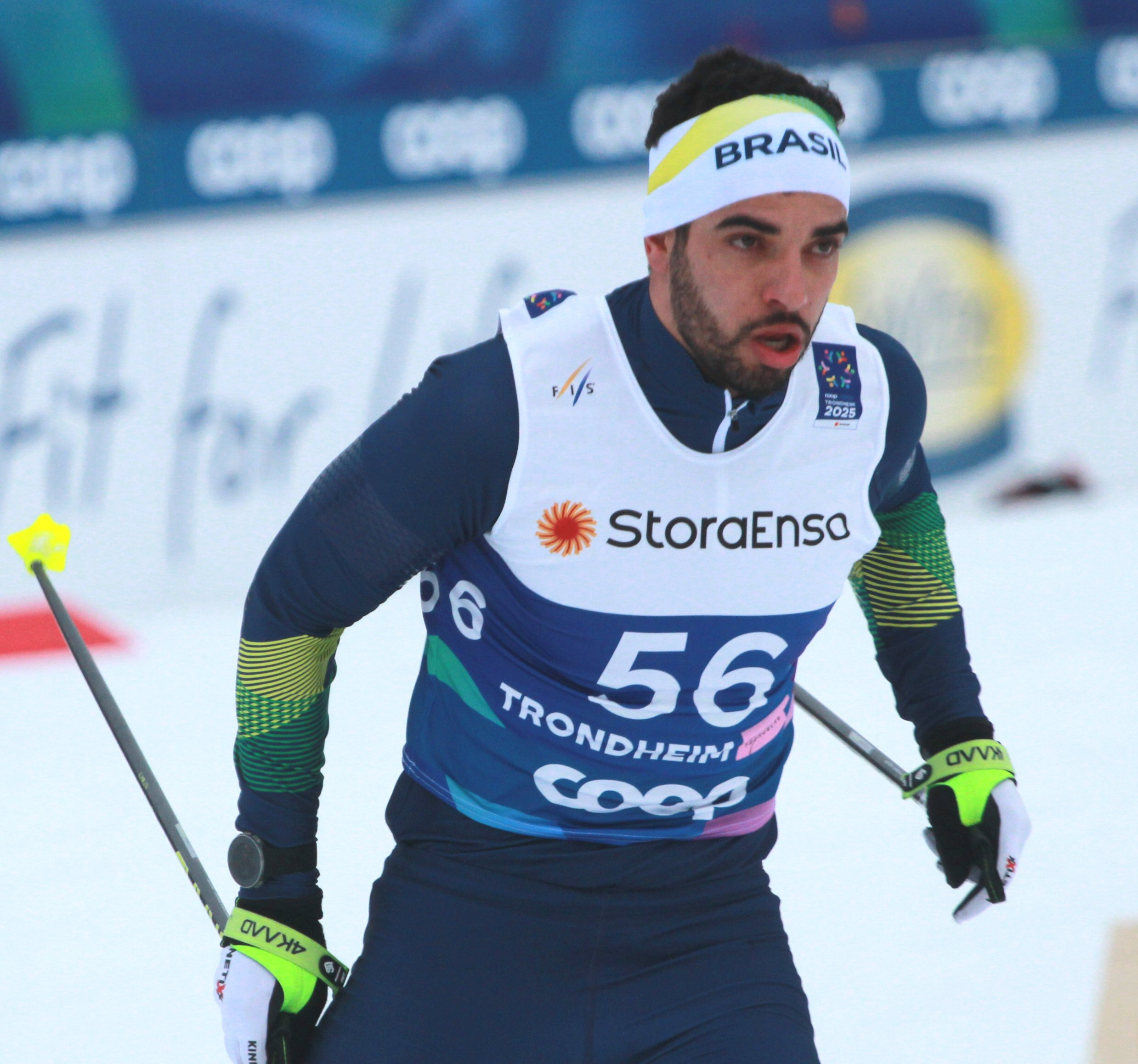

Personal information
- Nationality: Brazil
- Born: 27 June 1997 (age 29) São Paulo, Brazil

Sport
- Sport: Skiing

World Cup career
- Seasons: 1 – (2021, 2023–present)
- Indiv. starts: 4
- Indiv. podiums: 0
- Overall titles: 0
- Discipline titles: 0
- Updated on 24 February 2023

Victor Santos (Brazilian Portuguese: [ˈviktoʁ ˈsɐ̃tus]; born 27 June 1997) is a Brazilian cross-country skier. He competed in the 2018 Winter Olympics.

== Cross-country skiing results ==
All results are sourced from the International Ski Federation (FIS).

=== Olympic Games ===
Year	Age	15 km individual	30 km skiathlon	50 km mass start	Sprint	4 × 10 km relay	Team sprint
2018	20	110	—	—	—	—	—

=== World Championships ===
Year	Age	15 km individual	30 km skiathlon	50 km mass start	Sprint	4 × 10 km relay	Team sprint
2017	19	—	—	—	135	—	—
2019	21	—	—	—	112	—	—
2021	23	—	—	—	111	18	33
2023	25	—	—	—	101	—	—

=== World Cup ===
==== Season standings ====
Season	Age	Discipline standings			Ski Tour standings	
Season	Age	Overall	Distance	Sprint	Nordic Opening	Tour de Ski
2021	23	NC	NC	—	—	—
2023	25				—N/a	—
