= Carl Quicklund =

Swedish cross-country skier

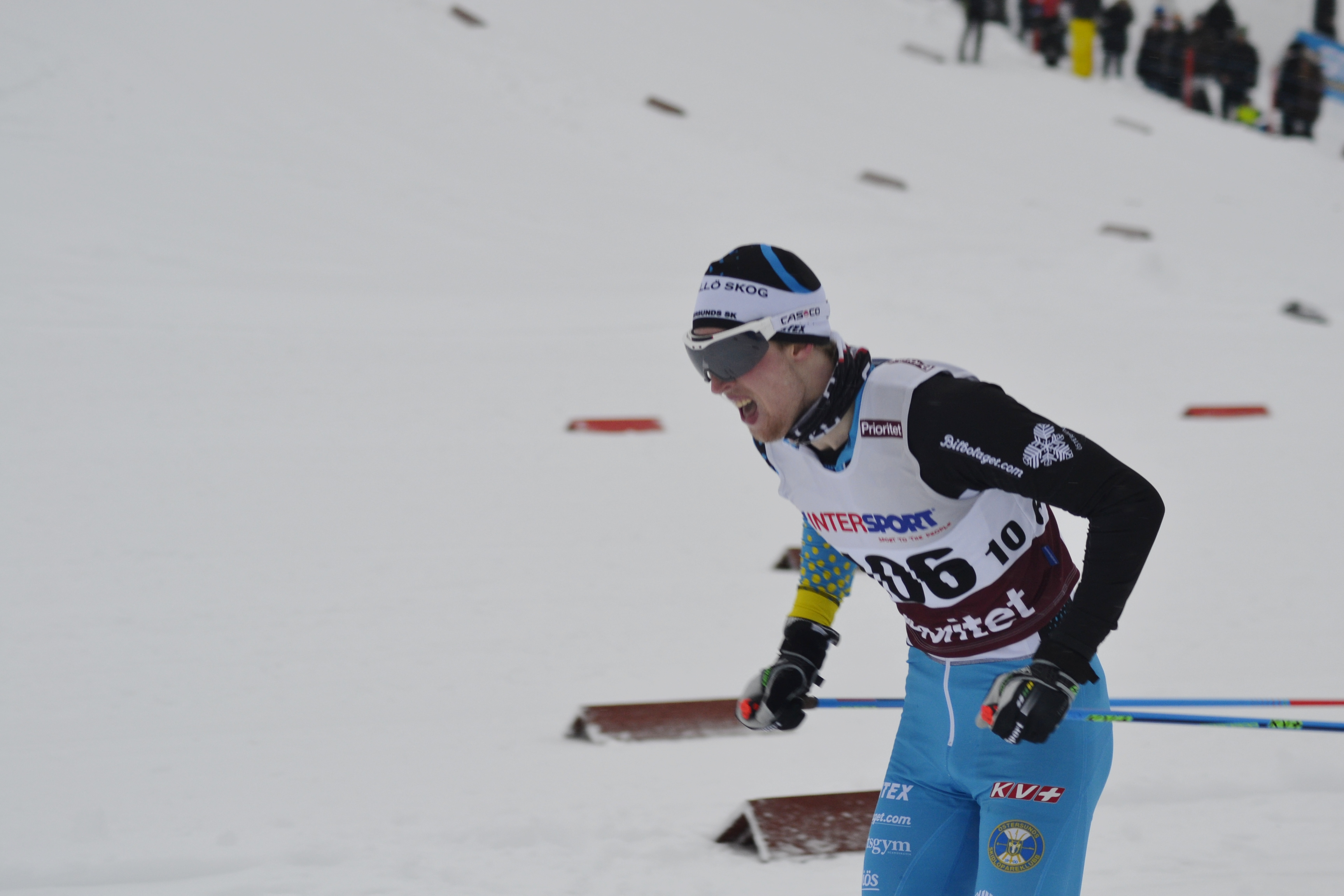
- Quicklund during the Swedish National Championships in Örebro, February 2015

Personal information
- Full name: Carl August Quicklund
- Nationality: Sweden
- Born: 28 January 1992 (age 34)

Sport
- Sport: Skiing
- Club: Östersunds SK

World Cup career
- Seasons: 5 – (2013–2017)
- Indiv. starts: 33
- Indiv. podiums: 0
- Team starts: 3
- Team podiums: 0
- Overall titles: 0 – (113th in 2016)
- Discipline titles: 0
- Updated on 4 April 2019

Carl Quicklund (born 28 January 1992) is a Swedish cross-country skier. He competed in the 2014–2015 World Cup season.

He represented Sweden at the FIS Nordic World Ski Championships 2015 in Falun.

In January 2017, he announced his retirement from cross-country skiing.

== Cross-country skiing results ==
All results are sourced from the International Ski Federation (FIS).

=== World Championships ===
Year	Age	15 km individual	30 km skiathlon	50 km mass start	Sprint	4 × 10 km relay	Team sprint
2015	23	—	—	—	24	—	—

=== World Cup ===
==== Season standings ====
Season	Age	Discipline standings			Ski Tour standings			
Season	Age	Overall	Distance	Sprint	Nordic Opening	Tour de Ski	World Cup Final	Ski Tour Canada
2013	21	NC	NC	NC	—	—	—	—N/a
2014	22	134	NC	79	—	47	—	—N/a
2015	23	158	—	99	—	—	—N/a	—N/a
2016	24	113	89	75	—	51	—N/a	—
2017	25	NC	—	NC	—	—	—	—N/a
