= Sebastian Eisenlauer =

German cross-country skier (born 1990)

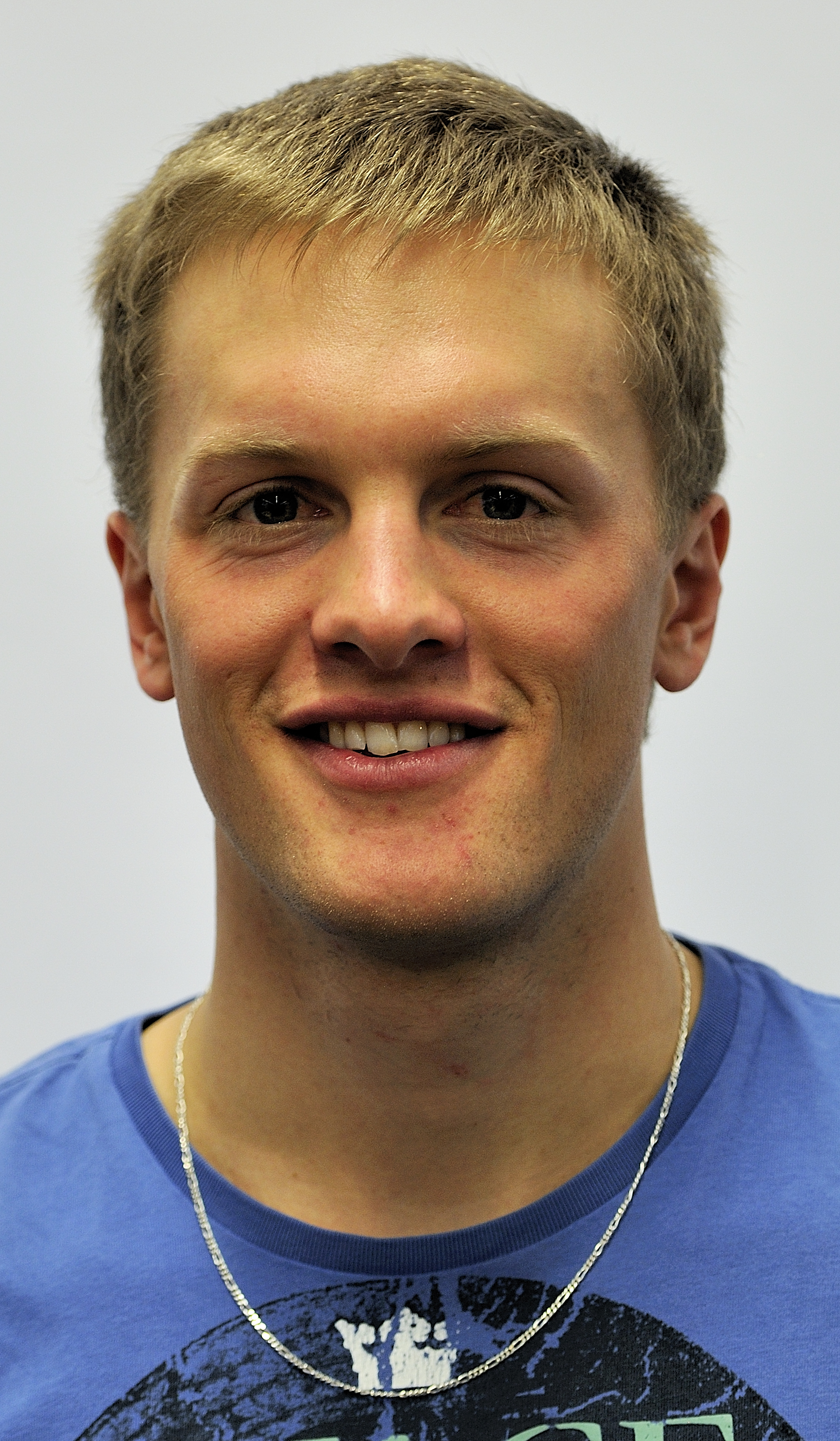

Personal information
- Nationality: Germany
- Born: 13 March 1990 (age 36) Sonthofen, West Germany
- Height: 1.81 m (5 ft 11 in)

Sport
- Sport: Skiing
- Club: SC Sonthofen

World Cup career
- Seasons: 11 – (2011–2021)
- Indiv. starts: 131
- Indiv. podiums: 0
- Team starts: 24
- Team podiums: 0
- Overall titles: 0 – (34th in 2016)
- Discipline titles: 0
- Updated on 7 November 2021

Sebastian Eisenlauer (born 13 March 1990) is a retired German cross-country skier.

Eisenlauer competed at the 2014 Winter Olympics for Germany. He placed 35th in the qualifying round in the sprint, failing to advance to the knockout stages.

As of April 2014, his best showing at the World Championships is 43rd, in the classical sprint event in 2013.

Eisenlauer made his World Cup debut in December 2010. As of April 2014, his best finish is a sixth, in a classical team sprint event at Nove Mesto in 2013–14. His best individual finish is seventh, in a Tour de Ski freestyle sprint race at Oberhof in 2013–14. His best World Cup overall finish is 34th, in 2015–16. His best World Cup finish in a discipline is 22nd, in the 2013–14 sprint.

In March 2021, he announced his retirement from cross-country skiing.

== Cross-country skiing results ==
All results are sourced from the International Ski Federation (FIS).

=== Olympic Games ===
Year	Age	15 km individual	30 km skiathlon	50 km mass start	Sprint	4 × 10 km relay	Team sprint
2014	23	—	—	—	35	—	—
2018	27	32	—	—	28	—	10

=== World Championships ===
Year	Age	15 km individual	30 km skiathlon	50 km mass start	Sprint	4 × 10 km relay	Team sprint
2013	22	—	—	—	43	—	—
2015	24	50	—	41	23	—	—
2017	26	—	—	—	20	—	7
2019	28	15	—	—	43	6	16
2021	30	—	—	—	37	—	12

=== World Cup ===
==== Season standings ====
Season	Age	Discipline standings			Ski Tour standings				
Season	Age	Overall	Distance	Sprint	Nordic Opening	Tour de Ski	Ski Tour 2020	World Cup Final	Ski Tour Canada
2011	21	109	NC	62	—	DNF	—N/a	—	—N/a
2012	22	137	NC	82	—	—	—N/a	—	—N/a
2013	23	105	NC	55	—	DNF	—N/a	—	—N/a
2014	24	58	NC	22	—	DNF	—N/a	—	—N/a
2015	25	107	NC	53	54	DNF	—N/a	—N/a	—N/a
2016	26	34	51	14	48	DNF	—N/a	—N/a	35
2017	27	108	NC	55	49	—	—N/a	—	—N/a
2018	28	79	69	47	33	DNF	—N/a	—	—N/a
2019	29	102	85	63	—	DNF	—N/a	—	—N/a
2020	30	69	61	59	45	25	—	—N/a	—N/a
2021	31	89	91	53	57	—	—N/a	—N/a	—N/a
