= Matias Strandvall =

Finnish cross-country skier

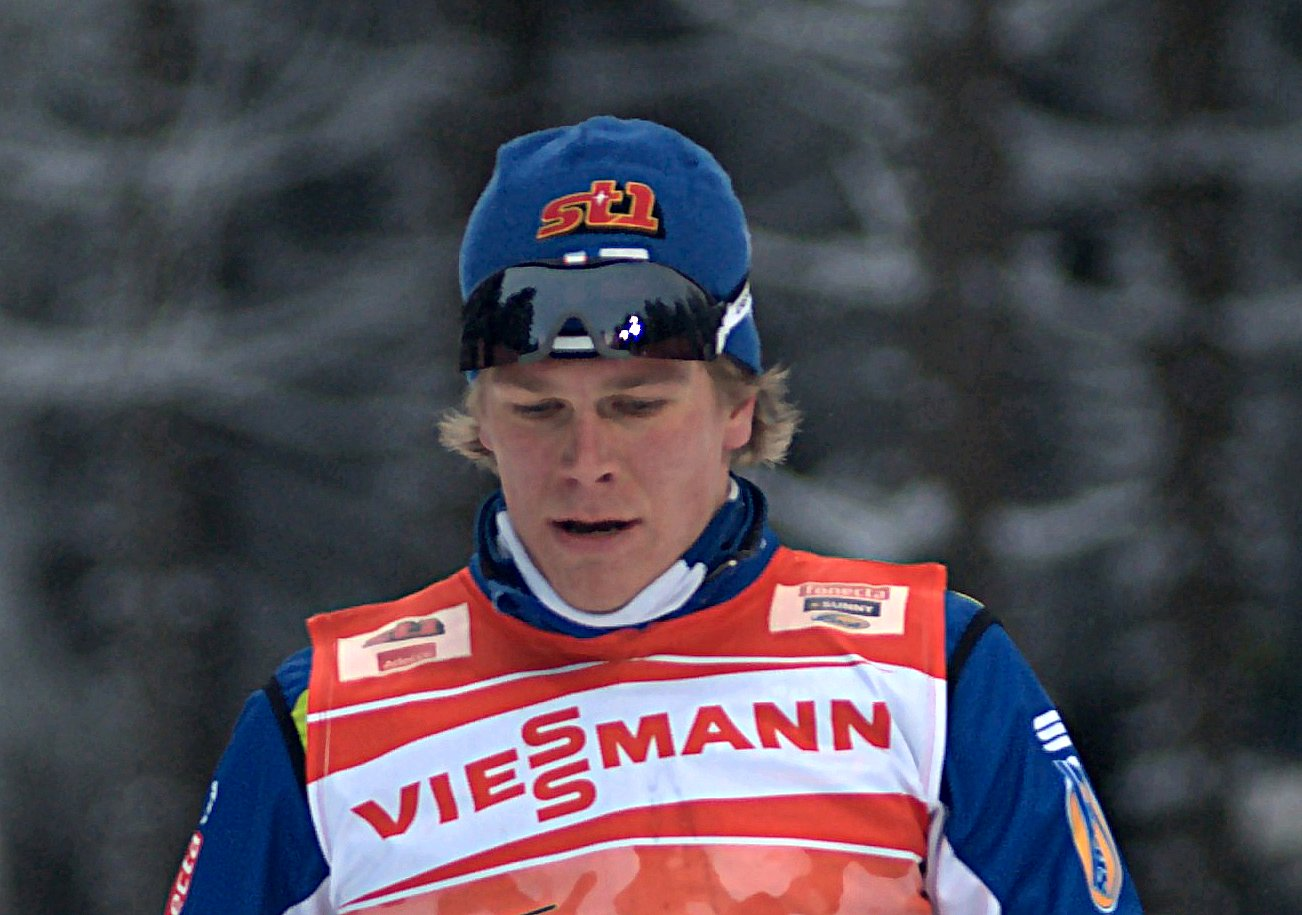
- Matias Strandvall in 2010

Personal information
- Nationality: Finland
- Born: 15 March 1985 (age 41) Helsinki, Finland

Sport
- Sport: Skiing
- Club: IF Minken

World Cup career
- Seasons: 14 – (2005–2018)
- Indiv. starts: 117
- Indiv. podiums: 1
- Indiv. wins: 0
- Team starts: 16
- Team podiums: 0
- Overall titles: 0 – (39th in 2008)
- Discipline titles: 0
Medal record
Men's cross-country skiing
Representing Finland
U23 World Championships
Bronze medal – third place	2007 Tarvisio	Individual sprint

Matias Strandvall (born 15 March 1985 in Helsinki), is a Finnish cross-country skier who has competed at World Cup-level since 2004. He finished 37th in the individual sprint event at the 2010 Winter Olympics in Vancouver, British Columbia, Canada.

Strandvall's best finish at the FIS Nordic World Ski Championships was ninth in the individual sprint at Sapporo in 2007.

His best World Cup finish is third in an individual sprint event at Canada in 2008.

Strandvall's brother Sebastian Strandvall is a football player in the Finnish league.

== Cross-country skiing results ==
All results are sourced from the International Ski Federation (FIS).

=== Olympic Games ===
Year	Age	15 km individual	30 km skiathlon	50 km mass start	Sprint	4 × 10 km relay	Team sprint
2010	24	—	—	—	37	—	—

=== World Championships ===
Year	Age	15 km individual	30 km skiathlon	50 km mass start	Sprint	4 × 10 km relay	Team sprint
2007	21	—	—	—	9	—	—
2009	23	—	—	—	24	—	—
2011	25	—	—	—	20	—	—
2013	27	—	—	—	17	—	16
2015	29	—	—	—	26	—	—
2017	31	—	—	—	27	—	—

=== World Cup ===
==== Season standings ====
Season	Age	Discipline standings			Ski Tour standings			
Season	Age	Overall	Distance	Sprint	Nordic Opening	Tour de Ski	World Cup Final	Ski Tour Canada
2005	20	NC	NC	NC	—N/a	—N/a	—N/a	—N/a
2006	21	130	NC	54	—N/a	—N/a	—N/a	—N/a
2007	22	68	NC	33	—N/a	—	—N/a	—N/a
2008	23	39	NC	12	—N/a	—	—	—N/a
2009	24	90	—	47	—N/a	—	—	—N/a
2010	25	62	NC	21	—N/a	DNF	—	—N/a
2011	26	46	NC	16	DNF	—	43	—N/a
2012	27	50	NC	18	DNF	—	40	—N/a
2013	28	100	NC	51	DNF	—	—	—N/a
2014	29	62	NC	24	DNF	—	—	—N/a
2015	30	69	NC	29	59	—	—N/a	—N/a
2016	31	59	NC	26	41	—	—N/a	DNF
2017	32	89	—	39	—	—	—	—N/a
2018	33	119	NC	66	DNF	—	—	—N/a

==== Individual podiums ====
- 1 podium – (1 WC)

No.	Season	Date	Location	Race	Level	Place
1	2007–08	26 January 2008	Canmore, Canada	1.2 km Sprint F	World Cup	3rd
