= Gianluca Cologna =

Swiss cross-country skier

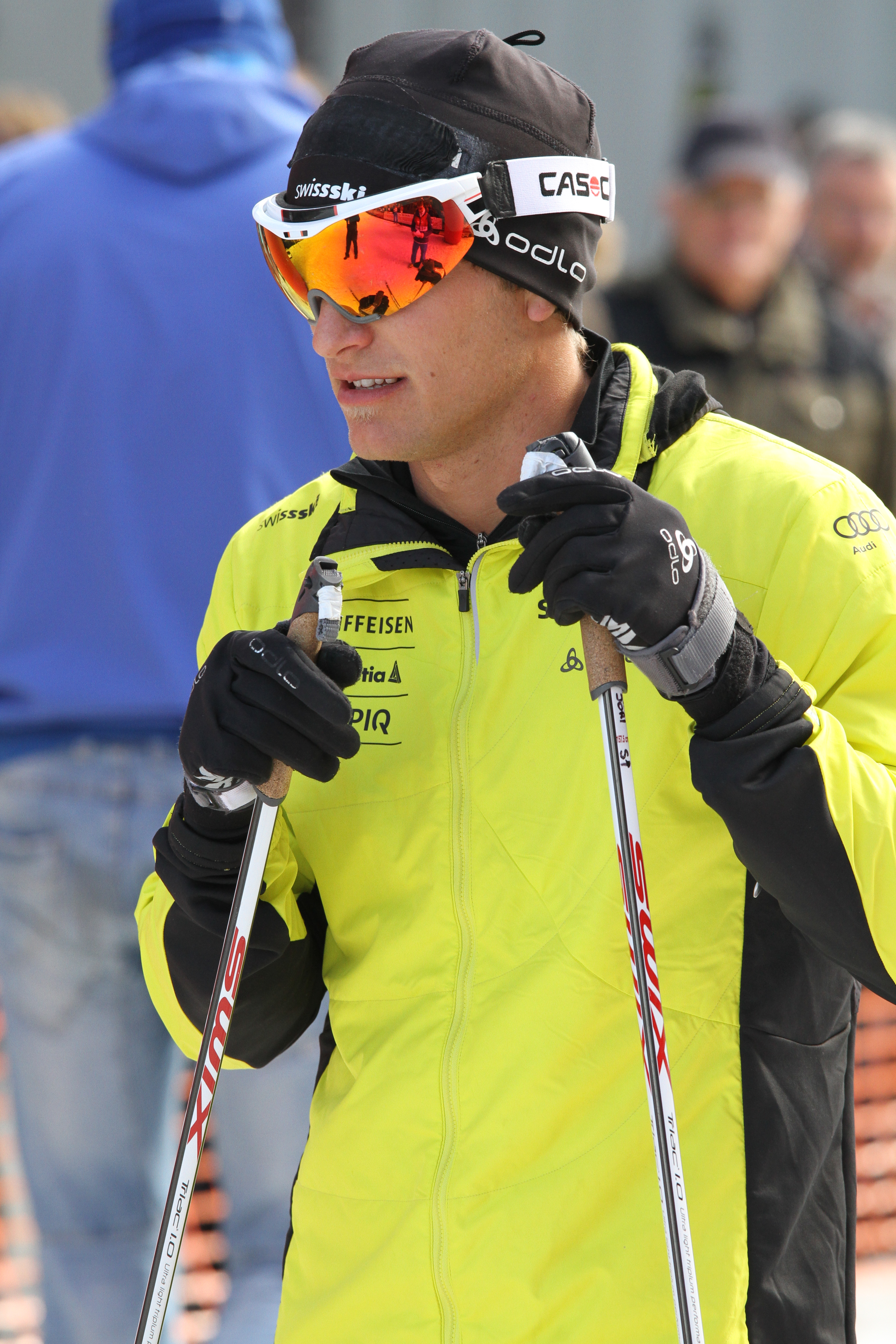
- Gianluca Cologna in Norway, 2013

Personal information
- Nationality: Switzerland
- Born: 17 May 1990 (age 36) Santa Maria Val Müstair, Switzerland
- Height: 1.78 m (5 ft 10 in)

Sport
- Sport: Skiing
- Club: SC Val Müstair

World Cup career
- Seasons: 8 – (2011–2018)
- Indiv. starts: 52
- Indiv. podiums: 1
- Indiv. wins: 0
- Team starts: 6
- Team podiums: 0
- Overall titles: 0 – (57th in 2014)
- Discipline titles: 0

Gianluca Cologna (born 17 May 1990) is a retired Swiss cross-country skier. His younger brother Dario Cologna is also a professional cross-country skier. He competed in the 2014 Winter Olympics in the Men's team sprint with his brother Dario and finished 5th in the final. He achieved his only individual podium in December 2013 with a third-place finish in the Classic Sprint in Asiago, Italy.

His retirement, after undergoing surgeries for shoulder and knee injuries, was first reported by the Swiss media on 25 March 2018 and confirmed by Cologna himself on his Facebook and Instagram accounts a few days later.

== Cross-country skiing results ==
All results are sourced from the International Ski Federation (FIS).

=== Olympic Games ===
| Year | Age | 15 km individual | 30 km skiathlon | 50 km mass start | Sprint | 4 × 10 km relay | Team sprint |
|---|---|---|---|---|---|---|---|
| 2014 | 23 | — | — | — | 47 | — | 5 |

=== World Championships ===
| Year | Age | 15 km individual | 30 km skiathlon | 50 km mass start | Sprint | 4 × 10 km relay | Team sprint |
|---|---|---|---|---|---|---|---|
| 2013 | 22 | — | — | — | 27 | — | — |
| 2015 | 24 | — | — | — | 27 | — | 15 |

=== World Cup ===
==== Season standings ====
| Season | Age | Discipline standings | | | Ski Tour standings | | | |
| Season | Age | Overall | Distance | Sprint | Nordic Opening | Tour de Ski | World Cup Final | Ski Tour Canada |
|---|---|---|---|---|---|---|---|---|
| 2011 | 20 | NC | — | NC | — | — | — | —N/a |
| 2012 | 21 | NC | NC | NC | — | — | — | —N/a |
| 2013 | 22 | 92 | — | 47 | — | — | — | —N/a |
| 2014 | 23 | 57 | NC | 21 | 78 | DNF | — | —N/a |
| 2015 | 24 | 98 | NC | 46 | DNF | DNF | —N/a | —N/a |
| 2016 | 25 | 98 | NC | 54 | DNF | — | —N/a | — |
| 2017 | 26 | 140 | 97 | NC | — | — | — | —N/a |
| 2018 | 27 | 127 | NC | 69 | — | DNF | — | —N/a |

==== Individual podiums ====
- 1 podium – (1 WC)

| No. | Season | Date | Location | Race | Level | Place |
|---|---|---|---|---|---|---|
| 1 | 2013–14 | 21 December 2013 | Asiago, Italy | 1.65 km Sprint C | World Cup | 3rd |
