= Naoto Baba =

Japanese cross-country skier (born 1996)

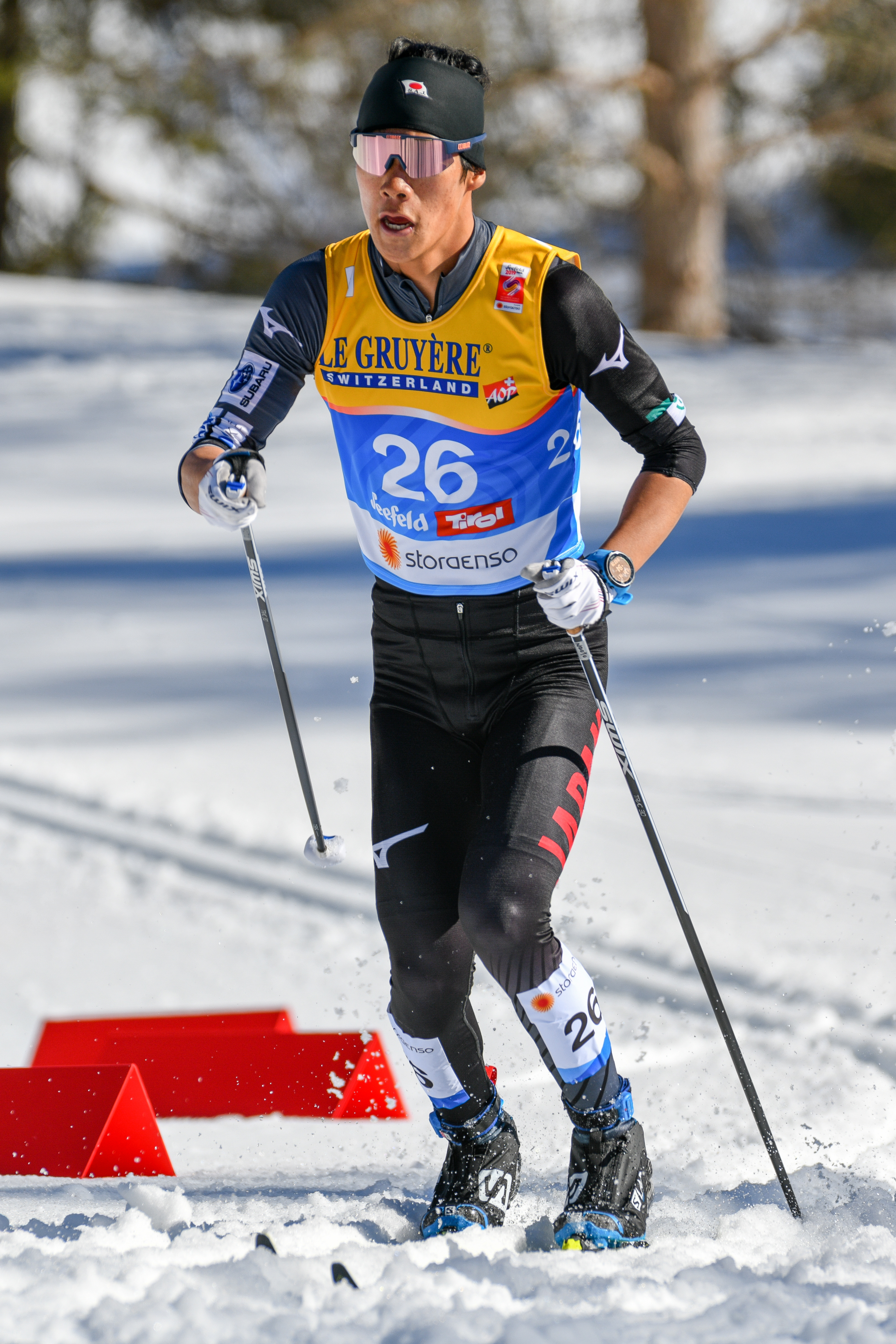
- Naoto Baba in 2019

Personal information
- Nationality: Japan
- Born: 20 July 1996 (age 30) Yamanouchi, Nagano, Japan

Sport
- Sport: Skiing
- Club: Nakano Construction SC

World Cup career
- Seasons: 6 – (2018–present)
- Indiv. starts: 57
- Indiv. podiums: 0
- Team starts: 1
- Team podiums: 0
- Overall titles: 0 – (39th in 2023)
- Discipline titles: 0
- Updated on 29 March 2023

Naoto Baba (馬場 直人, Baba Naoto; born 20 July 1996) is a Japanese cross-country skier who competes internationally.

He represented his country at the 2022 Winter Olympics.

== Cross-country skiing results ==
All results are sourced from the International Ski Federation (FIS).

=== Olympic Games ===
| Year | Age | 15 km individual | 30 km skiathlon | 50 km mass start | Sprint | 4 × 10 km relay | Team sprint |
|---|---|---|---|---|---|---|---|
| 2022 | 25 | — | 35 | 24^{[a]} | — | 10 | — |

^{a} Distance reduced to 30 km due to weather conditions.

=== World Championships ===
| Year | Age | 15 km individual | 30 km skiathlon | 50 km mass start | Sprint | 4 × 10 km relay | Team sprint |
|---|---|---|---|---|---|---|---|
| 2019 | 22 | 28 | 24 | 21 | — | — | — |
| 2021 | 24 | 19 | 25 | — | — | 9 | — |
| 2023 | 26 | 14 | 20 | 12 | — | 10 | — |

=== World Cup ===
==== Season standings ====
| Season | Age | Discipline standings | | | | Ski Tour standings | | | |
| Season | Age | Overall | Distance | Sprint | U23 | Nordic Opening | Tour de Ski | Ski Tour 2020 | World Cup Final |
|---|---|---|---|---|---|---|---|---|---|
| 2018 | 21 | NC | NC | NC | NC | — | — | —N/a | 65 |
| 2019 | 22 | NC | NC | — | NC | — | — | —N/a | — |
| 2020 | 23 | 92 | 52 | NC | —N/a | 36 | — | 40 | —N/a |
| 2021 | 24 | 110 | 70 | NC | —N/a | 53 | — | —N/a | —N/a |
| 2022 | 25 | 52 | 39 | NC | —N/a | —N/a | 24 | —N/a | —N/a |
| 2023 | 26 | 39 | 31 | NC | —N/a | —N/a | 26 | —N/a | —N/a |
