= Karel Tammjärv =

Estonian cross-country skier (born 1989)

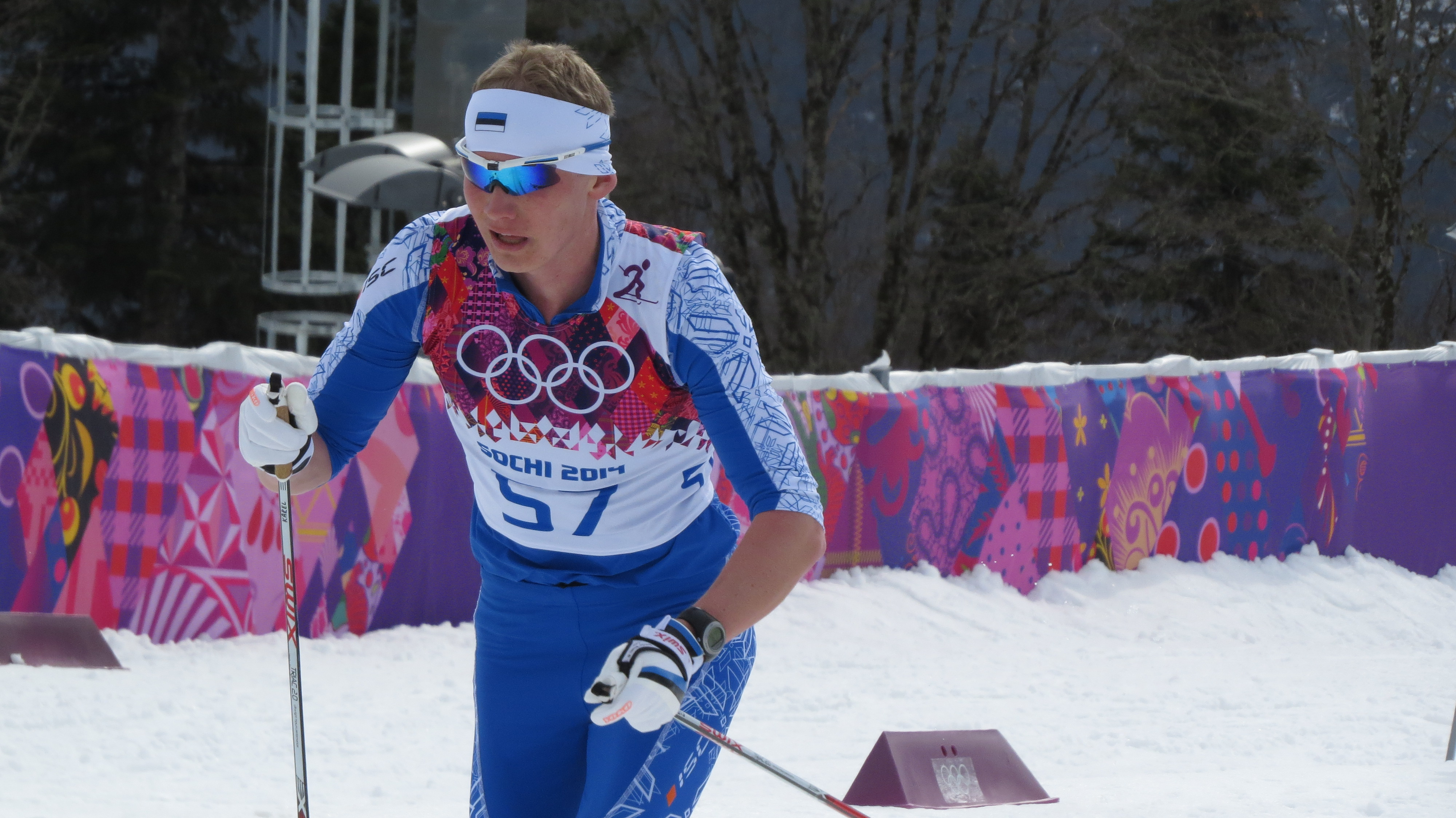
- Karel Tammjärv in 2014

Personal information
- Nationality: Estonia
- Born: 25 May 1989 (age 37) Tartu, then part of Estonian SSR, Soviet Union

Sport
- Sport: Skiing
- Club: Tartu SC

World Cup career
- Seasons: 11 – (2009–2019)
- Indiv. starts: 119
- Indiv. podiums: 0
- Team starts: 8
- Team podiums: 0
- Overall titles: 0 – (78th in 2018)
- Discipline titles: 0

Karel Tammjärv (born 25 May 1989 in Tartu) is an Estonian cross-country skier who has competed since 2007. At the 2010 Winter Olympics in Vancouver, he finished 46th in the 30 km mixed pursuit and 67th in the 15 km events. He also represented Estonia at the 2014 Winter Olympics and 2018 Winter Olympics.

Tammjärv's best World Cup finish was 10th in a 4 × 7.5 km relay at France in 2016 while his best individual finish was 13th in a 15 km event at Switzerland in 2017.

In February 2019, he was arrested for allegations of blood doping and subsequently admitted to having doped since 2016.

== Cross-country skiing results ==
All results are sourced from the International Ski Federation (FIS).

=== Olympic Games ===
Year	Age	15 km individual	30 km skiathlon	50 km mass start	Sprint	4 × 10 km relay	Team sprint
2010	20	67	46	—	—	—	—
2014	24	45	—	49	—	10	—
2018	28	22	32	—	53	12	17

=== World Championships ===
Year	Age	15 km individual	30 km skiathlon	50 km mass start	Sprint	4 × 10 km relay	Team sprint
2011	21	26	38	49	—	10	—
2013	23	—	57	39	—	15	—
2015	25	—	43	DNF	—	16	—
2017	27	—	36	—	58	13	—
2019	29	DNS	27	—	43	—	—

=== World Cup ===
==== Season standings ====
Season	Age	Discipline standings			Ski Tour standings			
Season	Age	Overall	Distance	Sprint	Nordic Opening	Tour de Ski	World Cup Final	Ski Tour Canada
2009	19	NC	NC	NC	—N/a	—	—	—N/a
2010	20	NC	NC	NC	—N/a	—	—	—N/a
2011	21	146	NC	90	—	—	—N/a	—N/a
2012	22	NC	NC	NC	48	DNF	—	—N/a
2013	23	129	95	NC	27	63	—	—N/a
2014	24	139	87	NC	72	44	—	—N/a
2015	25	NC	NC	NC	—	44	—N/a	—N/a
2016	26	NC	NC	NC	—	49	—N/a	—
2017	27	NC	NC	NC	63	DNF	—	—N/a
2018	28	78	57	NC	DNF	19	—	—N/a
2019	29	91	70	64	—	DNF	—	—N/a
