= Ketelä =

Ketelä is a Finnish surname. Notable people with the surname include:

- Martti Ketelä (1944–2002), Finnish modern pentathlete
- Toni Ketelä (born 1988), Finnish cross country skier
