= Tomas Northug =

Norwegian cross-country skier (born 1990)

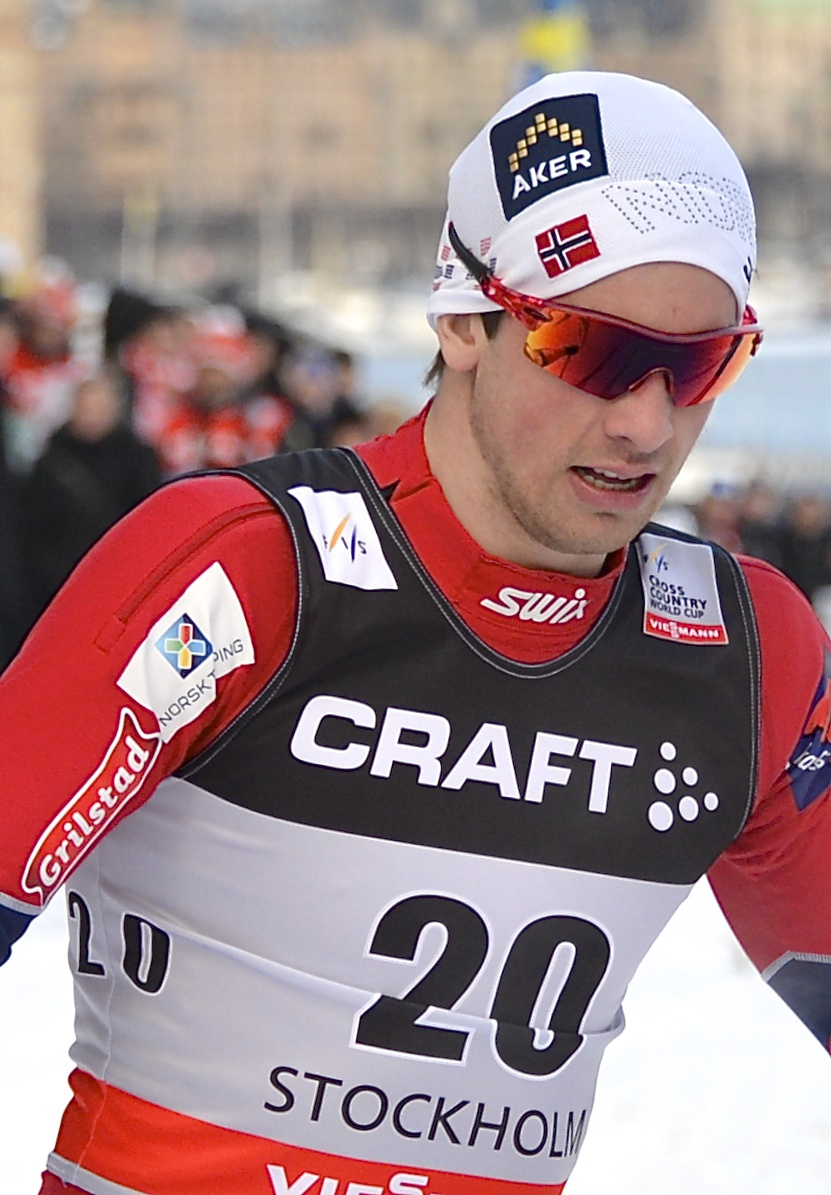

Personal information
- Nationality: Norway
- Born: 19 April 1990 (age 36) Mosvik Municipality, Nord-Trøndelag, Norway

Sport
- Sport: Skiing
- Club: Strindheim IL

World Cup career
- Seasons: 6 – (2010–2015)
- Indiv. starts: 33
- Indiv. podiums: 1
- Indiv. wins: 1
- Team starts: 1
- Team podiums: 0
- Overall titles: 0 – (32nd in 2015)
- Discipline titles: 0
Medal record
Men's cross-country skiing
Representing Norway
Junior World Championships
Gold medal – first place	2010 Hinterzarten	Individual sprint
Gold medal – first place	2010 Hinterzarten	4 × 5 km relay
Bronze medal – third place	2009 Praz de Lys-Sommand	4 × 5 km relay

Tomas Northug (born 19 April 1990) is a Norwegian cross-country skier. He was born in Mosvik Municipality, and is the middle brother of Petter Northug and Even Northug.

He won a World Cup victory in Otepää in January 2015. He became Junior World Champion in 2010.

He represented the sports clubs Mosvik IL and Strindheim IL.

== Cross-country skiing results ==
All results are sourced from the International Ski Federation (FIS).

=== World Championships ===
Year	Age	15 km individual	30 km skiathlon	50 km mass start	Sprint	4 × 10 km relay	Team sprint
2015	24	—	—	—	6	—	—

=== World Cup ===
==== Season standings ====
Season	Age	Discipline standings			Ski Tour standings		
Season	Age	Overall	Distance	Sprint	Nordic Opening	Tour de Ski	World Cup Final
2010	19	183	—	116	—N/a	—	
2011	20	104	—	58	—	—	—
2012	21	101	—	50	—	—	—
2013	22	64	NC	27	—	—	42
2014	23	110	NC	55	85	—	—
2015	24	32	—	7	—	—	—N/a

==== Individual podiums ====
- 1 victory – (1 WC)
- 1 podium – (1 WC)

No.	Season	Date	Location	Race	Level	Place
1	2014–15	17 January 2015	Otepää, Estonia	1.5 km Sprint C	World Cup	1st
