= Jonas Baumann =

Swiss cross-country skier

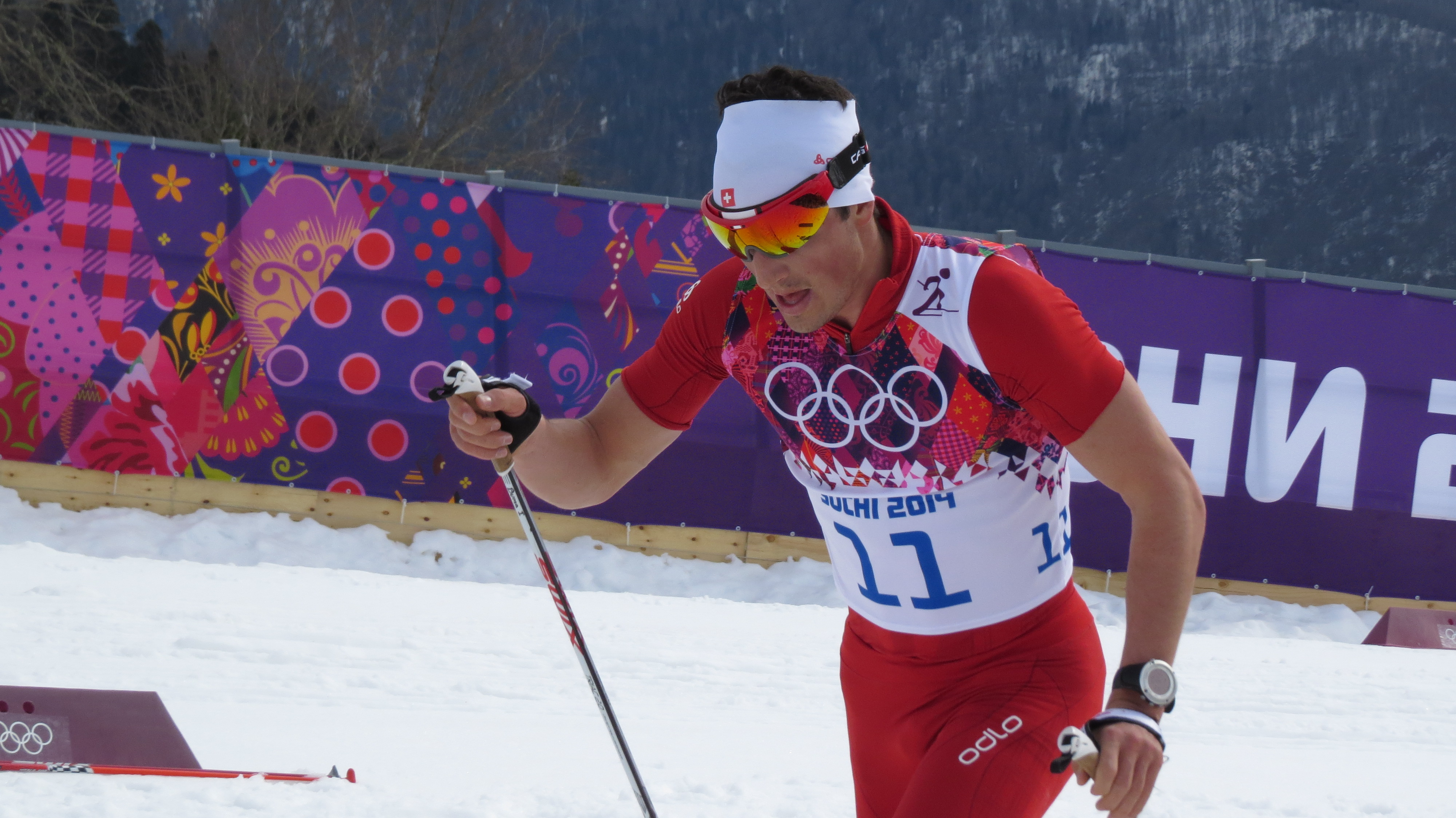
- Jonas Baumann in 2014

Personal information
- Nationality: Switzerland
- Born: 27 March 1990 (age 36) Lohn, Graubünden, Switzerland

Sport
- Sport: Skiing
- Club: Tambo Splügen

World Cup career
- Seasons: 14 – (2010–present)
- Indiv. starts: 187
- Indiv. podiums: 0
- Team starts: 6
- Team podiums: 0
- Overall titles: 0 – (39th in 2020)
- Discipline titles: 0
Medal record
World Championships
Silver medal – second place	2025 Trondheim	4 × 7.5 km relay
- Updated on 29 March 2023

Jonas Baumann (born 27 March 1990) is a cross-country skier from Switzerland. He competed for Switzerland at the 2014 Winter Olympics in the cross-country skiing events.

== Cross-country skiing results ==
All results are sourced from the International Ski Federation (FIS).

=== Olympic Games ===
Year	Age	15 km individual	30 km skiathlon	50 km mass start	Sprint	4 × 10 km relay	Team sprint
2014	23	24	28	—	—	7	—
2018	27	—	39	—	—	11	—
2022	31	16	15	—^{[a]}	—	7	8

^{a} Distance reduced to 30 km due to weather conditions.

=== World Championships ===
Year	Age	15 km individual	30 km skiathlon	50 km mass start	Sprint	4 × 10 km relay	Team sprint
2015	24	36	30	18	—	5	—
2017	26	17	13	—	—	4	—
2019	28	14	26	—	—	8	—
2021	30	—	20	22	—	—	—
2023	32	—	18	27	—	8	—

=== World Cup ===
==== Season standings ====
Season	Age	Discipline standings			Ski Tour standings				
Season	Age	Overall	Distance	Sprint	Nordic Opening	Tour de Ski	Ski Tour 2020	World Cup Final	Ski Tour Canada
2010	19	NC	NC	NC	—N/a	—	—N/a	—	—N/a
2011	20	NC	NC	—	—	—	—N/a	—	—N/a
2012	21	NC	NC	—	—	—	—N/a	—	—N/a
2013	22	NC	NC	NC	54	58	—N/a	—	—N/a
2014	23	100	60	NC	39	40	—N/a	—	—N/a
2015	24	53	39	NC	—	22	—N/a	—N/a	—N/a
2016	25	42	37	89	40	20	—N/a	—N/a	26
2017	26	46	39	NC	65	21	—N/a	28	—N/a
2018	27	47	32	NC	24	29	—N/a	43	—N/a
2019	28	95	62	NC	40	32	—N/a	—	—N/a
2020	29	39	29	NC	24	20	30	—N/a	—N/a
2021	30	64	50	NC	49	28	—N/a	—N/a	—N/a
2022	31	40	29	NC	—N/a	18	—N/a	—N/a	—N/a
2023	32	102	58	NC	—N/a	DNF	—N/a	—N/a	—N/a
