= Ristomatti Hakola =

Finnish cross-country skier (born 1991)

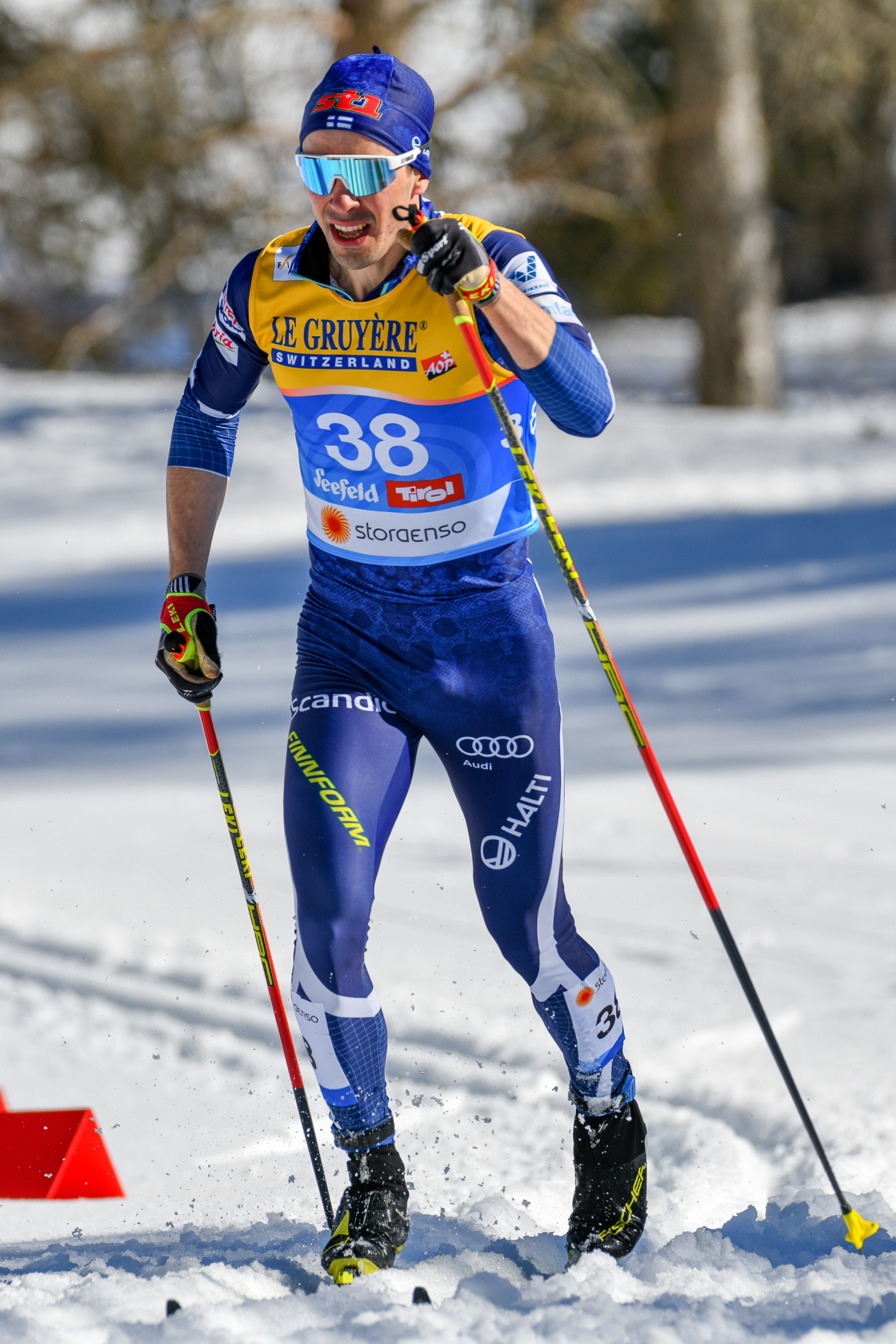
- Hakola in 2019

Personal information
- Full name: Ristomatti Juhani Hakola
- Nationality: Finland
- Born: 15 April 1991 (age 35) Kankaanpää, Finland
- Height: 1.82 m (6 ft 0 in)

Sport
- Sport: Skiing
- Club: Jämin Jänne

World Cup career
- Seasons: 13 – (2012–present)
- Indiv. starts: 109
- Indiv. podiums: 0
- Team starts: 10
- Team podiums: 3
- Team wins: 0
- Overall titles: 0 – (19th in 2018)
- Discipline titles: 0
Medal record
Men's cross-country skiing
Representing Finland
World Championships
Silver medal – second place	2021 Oberstdorf	Team sprint
Silver medal – second place	2023 Planica	4 × 10 km relay
Silver medal – second place	2025 Trondheim	Team sprint
- Updated on 5 March 2025

Ristomatti Hakola (born 15 April 1991) is a Finnish cross-country skier.

He represented Finland at the FIS Nordic World Ski Championships 2015 in Falun and at the FIS Nordic World Ski Championships 2017 in Lahti where he finished sixth in the sprint competition.

== Cross-country skiing results ==
All results are sourced from the International Ski Federation (FIS).

=== Olympic Games ===
Year	Age	10/15 km individual	20/30 km skiathlon	50 km mass start	Sprint	4 × 7.5/10 km relay	Team sprint
2018	26	—	—	43	6	—	9
2022	30	31	—	—^{[a]}	—	6	—
2026	34	—	52	DNS	—	—	—

^{a} Distance reduced to 30 km due to weather conditions.

=== World Championships ===
- 3 medals – (3 silver)

Year	Age	10/15 km individual	20/30 km skiathlon	50 km mass start	Sprint	4 × 7.5/10 km relay	Team sprint
2015	23	—	—	38	9	—	—
2017	25	—	—	—	6	—	—
2019	27	29	—	—	15	4	7
2021	29	—	—	—	16	6	Silver
2023	31	—	—	33	—	Silver	—
2025	33						Silver

=== World Cup ===
==== Season standings ====
Season	Age	Discipline standings			Ski Tour standings				
Season	Age	Overall	Distance	Sprint	Nordic Opening	Tour de Ski	Ski Tour 2020	World Cup Final	Ski Tour Canada
2012	20	NC	—	NC	—	—	—N/a	—	—N/a
2013	21	NC	NC	NC	—	—	—N/a	—	—N/a
2014	22	114	NC	60	—	—	—N/a	—	—N/a
2015	23	75	68	41	—	—	—N/a	—N/a	—N/a
2016	24	57	NC	24	57	44	—N/a	—N/a	—
2017	25	34	74	17	—	DNF	—N/a	17	—N/a
2018	26	19	48	5	DNF	DNF	—N/a	14	—N/a
2019	27	28	29	20	28	DNF	—N/a	13	—N/a
2020	28	41	41	26	DNF	—	—	—N/a	—N/a
2021	29	32	30	32	10	—	—N/a	—N/a	—N/a
2022	30	56	50	38	—N/a	—	—N/a	—N/a	—N/a
2023	31	76	48	77	—N/a	—	—N/a	—N/a	—N/a

==== Team podiums ====
- 3 podiums – (1 RL, 2 TS)

No.	Season	Date	Location	Race	Level	Place	Teammate(s)
1	2018–19	10 February 2019	Lahti, Finland	6 × 1.6 km Team Sprint C	World Cup	3rd	Niskanen
2	2019–20	22 December 2019	Planica, Slovenia	6 × 1.2 km Team Sprint F	World Cup	3rd	Mäki
3	2020–21	24 January 2021	Lahti, Finland	4 × 7.5 km Relay C/F	World Cup	2nd	Hyvärinen / Niskanen / Mäki
