= Toni Ketelä =

Finnish cross-country skier

Personal information
- Nationality: Finland
- Born: 16 March 1988 (age 38)

Sport
- Sport: Skiing
- Club: IF Minken

World Cup career
- Seasons: 8 – (2011–2018)
- Indiv. starts: 33
- Indiv. podiums: 1
- Indiv. wins: 0
- Team starts: 1
- Team podiums: 0
- Overall titles: 0 – (58th in 2015)
- Discipline titles: 0

Toni Ketelä (born 16 March 1988) is a Finnish cross-country skier.

He represented Finland at the FIS Nordic World Ski Championships 2015 in Falun.

== Cross-country skiing results ==
All results are sourced from the International Ski Federation (FIS).

=== World Championships ===
| Year | Age | 15 km individual | 30 km skiathlon | 50 km mass start | Sprint | 4 × 10 km relay | Team sprint |
|---|---|---|---|---|---|---|---|
| 2015 | 26 | — | — | — | 10 | — | — |

=== World Cup ===
==== Season standings ====
| Season | Age | Discipline standings | | | Ski Tour standings | | | |
| Season | Age | Overall | Distance | Sprint | Nordic Opening | Tour de Ski | World Cup Final | Ski Tour Canada |
|---|---|---|---|---|---|---|---|---|
| 2011 | 23 | NC | — | NC | — | — | — | —N/a |
| 2012 | 24 | 121 | — | 69 | — | — | — | —N/a |
| 2013 | 25 | 108 | NC | 57 | 76 | — | — | —N/a |
| 2014 | 26 | 164 | — | 104 | — | — | — | —N/a |
| 2015 | 27 | 58 | NC | 20 | — | — | —N/a | —N/a |
| 2016 | 28 | 93 | NC | 53 | 63 | — | —N/a | — |
| 2017 | 29 | 138 | NC | 73 | — | — | — | —N/a |
| 2018 | 30 | 94 | NC | 48 | NC | — | — | —N/a |

==== Individual podiums ====
- 1 podium – (1 WC)

| No. | Season | Date | Location | Race | Level | Place |
|---|---|---|---|---|---|---|
| 1 | 2014–15 | 17 January 2015 | Otepää, Estonia | 1.5 km Sprint C | World Cup | 3rd |
