= Andreas Katz =

German cross-country skier

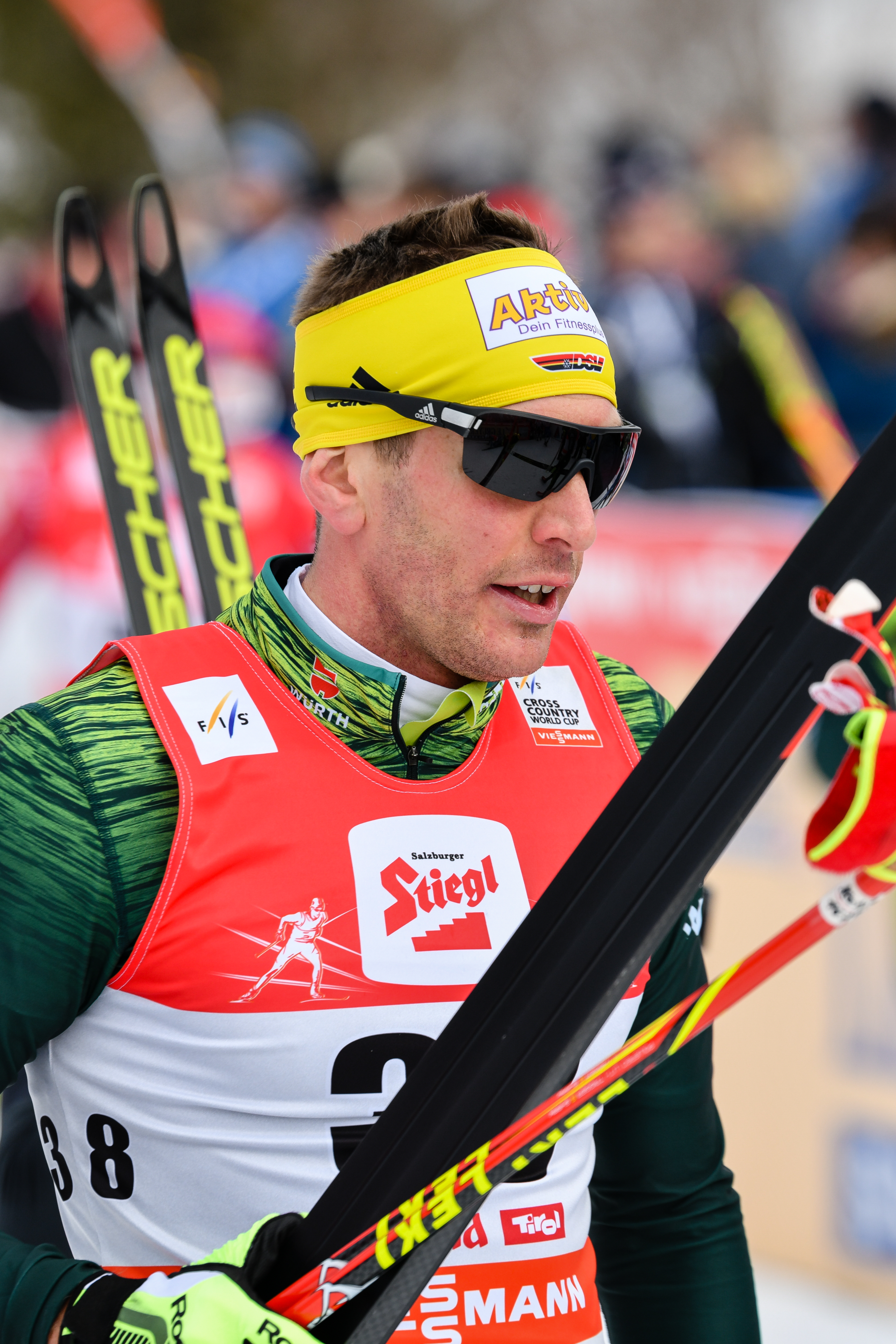

Personal information
- Nationality: Germany
- Born: 8 January 1988 (age 38) Freudenstadt, West Germany
- Height: 1.82 m (6 ft 0 in)

Sport
- Sport: Skiing
- Club: SV Baiersbronn

World Cup career
- Seasons: 11 – (2010–2016, 2018–present)
- Indiv. starts: 102
- Indiv. podiums: 0
- Team starts: 5
- Team podiums: 0
- Overall titles: 0 – (41st in 2016)
- Discipline titles: 0
Medal record
Representing Germany
Men's cross-country skiing
U23 World Championships
Bronze medal – third place	2010 Hinterzarten	30 km skiathlon
- Updated on 7 November 2021

Andreas Katz (born 8 January 1988) is a German cross-country skier who competes internationally.

He represented Germany at the 2018 Winter Olympics.

== Cross-country skiing results ==
All results are sourced from the International Ski Federation (FIS).

=== Olympic Games ===
Year	Age	15 km individual	30 km skiathlon	50 km mass start	Sprint	4 × 10 km relay	Team sprint
2018	30	25	35	14	—	6	—

=== World Championships ===
Year	Age	15 km individual	30 km skiathlon	50 km mass start	Sprint	4 × 10 km relay	Team sprint
2019	31	13	28	43	—	6	—

=== World Cup ===
==== Season standings ====
Season	Age	Discipline standings			Ski Tour standings				
Season	Age	Overall	Distance	Sprint	Nordic Opening	Tour de Ski	Ski Tour 2020	World Cup Final	Ski Tour Canada
2010	22	109	68	NC	—N/a	DNF	—N/a	—	—N/a
2011	23	176	107	NC	—	DNF	—N/a	—	—N/a
2012	24	NC	NC	NC	70	DNF	—N/a	—	—N/a
2013	25	143	89	NC	62	38	—N/a	—	—N/a
2014	26	NC	NC	—	—	—	—N/a	—	—N/a
2015	27	NC	NC	NC	46	—	—N/a	—N/a	—N/a
2016	28	41	34	78	—	16	—N/a	—N/a	DNF
2018	30	67	46	NC	31	27	—N/a	—	—N/a
2019	31	92	64	NC	—	29	—N/a	38	—N/a
2020	32	94	56	NC	41	—	—	—N/a	—N/a
2021	33	109	69	NC	40	DNF	—N/a	—N/a	—N/a
