= FIS Nordic World Ski Championships 2015 – Men's sprint =

Men's sprint at the FIS Nordic World Ski Championships 2015
- Date: 19 February 2015
- Competitors: 128 from 49 nations
- Winning time: 3:02.35

Medalists
gold medal	Petter Northug	Norway
silver medal	Alex Harvey	Canada
bronze medal	Ola Vigen Hattestad	Norway

The Men's sprint event of the FIS Nordic World Ski Championships 2015 was held on 19 February 2015.

== Results ==
=== Qualification ===
The qualification was held at 13:35.

Rank	Bib	Athlete	Country	Time	Deficit	Note
1	15	Nikita Kryukov	Russia	2:59.92		Q
2	8	Ola Vigen Hattestad	Norway	2:59.94	+0.02	Q
3	7	Tomas Northug	Norway	3:00.06	+0.14	Q
4	27	Ueli Schnider	Switzerland	3:00.19	+0.27	Q
5	11	Alex Harvey	Canada	3:02.32	+2.40	Q
6	13	Calle Halfvarsson	Sweden	3:03.20	+3.28	Q
7	29	Ristomatti Hakola	Finland	3:03.23	+3.31	Q
8	26	Jovian Hediger	Switzerland	3:03.42	+3.50	Q
9	20	Anssi Pentsinen	Finland	3:03.49	+3.57	Q
10	14	Andrew Newell	United States	3:03.56	+3.64	Q
11	23	Sebastian Eisenlauer	Germany	3:03.67	+3.75	Q
12	9	Toni Ketelä	Finland	3:04.02	+4.10	Q
13	5	Eirik Brandsdal	Norway	3:04.33	+4.41	Q
14	6	Matias Strandvall	Finland	3:04.68	+4.76	Q
15	17	Federico Pellegrino	Italy	3:04.89	+4.97	Q
16	24	Gianluca Cologna	Switzerland	3:05.23	+5.31	Q
17	28	Carl Quicklund	Sweden	3:05.32	+5.40	Q
18	3	Petter Northug	Norway	3:05.62	+5.70	Q
19	21	Peeter Kummel	Estonia	3:05.71	+5.79	Q
20	18	Teodor Peterson	Sweden	3:05.72	+5.80	Q
21	22	Len Väljas	Canada	3:05.73	+5.81	Q
22	25	Tim Tscharnke	Germany	3:06.08	+6.16	Q
23	42	Nikolay Chebotko	Kazakhstan	3:06.11	+6.19	Q
24	39	Dominik Baldauf	Austria	3:06.20	+6.28	Q
25	30	Hiroyuki Miyazawa	Japan	3:06.23	+6.31	Q
26	12	Alexey Petukhov	Russia	3:06.30	+6.38	Q
27	34	Maicol Rastelli	Italy	3:06.37	+6.45	Q
28	16	Simeon Hamilton	United States	3:06.56	+6.64	Q
29	4	Sergey Ustiugov	Russia	3:07.11	+7.19	Q
30	41	Dakota Blackhorse-von Jess	United States	3:07.25	+7.33	Q
31	1	Andrey Parfenov	Russia	3:08.83	+7.91	
32	48	Jan Bartoň	Czech Republic	3:08.13	+8.21	
33	49	Richard Jouve	France	3:08.25	+8.33	
34	10	Alexander Panzhinskiy	Russia	3:08.34	+8.42	
35	33	Alexey Poltoranin	Kazakhstan	3:08.36	+8.44	
36	38	Marko Kilp	Estonia	3:08.64	+8.72	
37	53	Maciej Kreczmer	Poland	3:08.87	+8.95	
38	2	Maciej Staręga	Poland	3:09.45	+9.53	
39	37	Konrad Motor	Poland	3:09.54	+9.62	
40	32	Andrew Young	Great Britain	3:09.79	+9.87	
41	57	Peter Mlynár	Slovakia	3:10.28	+10.36	
42	50	Sebastian Gazurek	Poland	3:10.36	+10.44	
43	19	Johan Edin	Sweden	3:10.57	+10.65	
44	40	Siim Sellis	Estonia	3:10.87	+10.95	
45	44	Raido Ränkel	Estonia	3:11.84	+11.92	
46	36	Thomas Bing	Germany	3:12.87	+12.95	
47	52	Markus Bader	Austria	3:13.05	+13.13	
48	45	Aleš Razým	Czech Republic	3:13.07	+13.15	
49	35	Jesse Cockney	Canada	3:13.52	+13.60	
50	46	Aliaksandr Voranau	Belarus	3:13.78	+13.86	
51	31	Dušan Kožíšek	Czech Republic	3:14.70	+14.78	
52	70	Paul Constantin Pepene	Romania	3:15.15	+15.33	
52	51	Denis Volotka	Kazakhstan	3:15.25	+15.33	
54	47	Benjamin Saxton	United States	3:16.13	+16.21	
55	55	Michail Semenov	Belarus	3:17.09	+17.17	
56	54	Ruslan Perekhoda	Ukraine	3:19.18	+19.26	
57	58	Andrej Segeč	Slovakia	3:19.83	+19.91	
58	64	Sergey Cherepanov	Kazakhstan	3:21.34	+21.42	
59	60	Martin Kapso	Slovakia	3:22.09	+22.17	
60	63	Sergey Mikayelyan	Armenia	3:22.47	+22.55	
61	65	Erik Urgela	Slovakia	3:23.28	+23.36	
62	71	Oleksiy Krasovsky	Ukraine	3:23.57	+23.65	
63	59	Veselin Tsinzov	Bulgaria	3:24.43	+24.51	
64	43	Phillip Bellingham	Australia	3:25.22	+25.30	
65	73	Lasse Hulgaard	Denmark	3:25.26	+25.34	
66	56	Modestas Vaičiulis	Lithuania	3:25.94	+26.02	
67	80	Sævar Birgisson	Iceland	3:26.25	+26.33	
68	90	Petrică Hogiu	Romania	3:28.02	+28.10	
69	68	Edi Dadić	Croatia	3:29.94	+30.02	
70	62	Kari Peters	Luxembourg	3:30.42	+30.50	
71	91	Boldyn Byambadorj	Mongolia	3:31.67	+31.75	
72	72	Florin Daniel Pripic	Romania	3:32.42	+32.50	
73	74	Stanimir Belomazhev	Bulgaria	3:32.54	+32.62	
74	75	Kostyantyn Yaremenko	Ukraine	3:35.00	+35.08	
75	88	Andriy Orlyk	Ukraine	3:36.09	+36.17	
76	78	Yordan Chuchuganov	Bulgaria	3:36.48	+36.56	
77	97	Karl-Peter Kristensen	Denmark	3:38.55	+38.63	
78	83	Artur Yeghoyan	Armenia	3:39.85	+39.93	
79	79	Xin Detao	China	3:41.21	+41.29	
80	76	Shang Jincai	China	3:41.23	+41.31	
81	67	Jānis Paipals	Latvia	3:42.73	+42.81	
82	69	Paul Kovacs	Australia	3:43.04	+43.12	
83	77	Arturs Ivanovs	Latvia	3:43.97	+44.05	
84	84	Jaunius Drūsys	Lithuania	3:44.97	+45.05	
85	96	Batmunkh Achbadrakh	Mongolia	3:46.83	+46.91	
86	66	Jackson Bursill	Australia	3:47.75	+47.83	
87	99	Rokas Vaitkus	Lithuania	3:49.23	+49.31	
88	98	Savaş Ateş	Turkey	3:50.52	+50.60	
89	86	Andrew Pohl	New Zealand	3:50.66	+50.74	
90	81	Simeon Deyanov	Bulgaria	3:51.27	+51.35	
91	106	filip Ružič	Croatia	3:55.07	+55.15	
92	61	Pāvels Ribakovs	Latvia	3:55.13	+55.21	
93	108	Jean-Loup Gregoire	Belgium	3:55.52	+55.60	
94	85	Sattar Seid	Iran	3:56.01	+56.09	
95	104	Mikayel Mikayelyan	Armenia	3:56.10	+56.18	
96	94	Tue Rømer	Denmark	3:56.55	+56.63	
97	95	Daumantas Petrovas	Lithuania	3:56.74	+56.82	
98	102	Jens Hulgaard	Denmark	3:59.82	+59.90	
99	82	Mark Pollock	Australia	4:00.53	+1:00.61	
100	92	Cho Yong-jin	South Korea	4:01.02	+1:01.10	
101	119	Jan Rossiter	Ireland	4:02.22	+1:02.30	
102	127	Bence Banszki	Hungary	4:02.82	+1:02.90	
103	128	András Csúcs	Hungary	4:03.60	+1:03.68	
103	120	Carlos Lannes	Argentina	4:03.60	+1:03.68	
105	129	Károly Gombos	Hungary	4:08.19	+1:08.27	
106	105	Georgios Papasis	Greece	4:09.32	+1:09.40	
107	93	Georgios Nakas	Greece	4:09.70	+1:09.78	
108	107	Ömer Ayçiçek	Turkey	4:10.91	+1:10.99	
109	130	Márton Pálfy	Hungary	4:12.50	+1:12.58	
110	101	Artush Mkrtchyan	Armenia	4:13.20	+1:13.28	
111	87	Yasin Shemshaki	Iran	4:13.75	+1:13.83	
112	118	Tošo Stanoeski	Macedonia	4:20.51	+1:20.59	
113	89	Victor Pînzaru	Moldova	4:26.14	+1:26.22	
114	111	Sote Andreski	Macedonia	4:28.54	+1:28.62	
115	116	Fabrizio Bourguignon	Brazil	4:39.93	+1:40.01	
116	114	Liviu Dubalari	Moldova	4:42.85	+1:42.93	
117	115	Cristian Bocancea	Moldova	4:46.28	+1:46.36	
118	125	Sveatoslav Maliutin	Moldova	4:48.28	+1:48.36	
119	103	Konstantinos Kyriakidis	Greece	4:54.08	+1:54.16	
120	126	Dominic McAleenan	Ireland	4:54.32	+1:54.40	
121	110	Mark Rajack	Trinidad and Tobago	5:01.03	+2:01.11	
122	123	Sergei Trelevskii	Kyrgyzstan	5:02.46	+2:02.54	
123	100	Leandro Ribela	Brazil	5:08.57	+2:08.65	
124	109	Dimitrios Batsis	Greece	5:31.10	+2:31.18	
125	121	Samir Azzimani	Morocco	5:37.19	+2:37.27	
126	117	Cesar Baena	Venezuela	5:41.87	+2:41.95	
127	122	Mansour Bazouni	Lebanon	6:16.52	+3:16.60	
	124	Joseph-Antonio Zavala	Venezuela	DNF		
	112	Bernardo Baena	Venezuela	DNS		
	113	Jorge-Ernesto Crespo	Venezuela	DNS		

=== Quarterfinals ===
The quarterfinals were started at 15:45.

==== Quarterfinal 1 ====
Rank	Seed	Athlete	Country	Time	Deficit	Note
1	20	Teodor Peterson	Sweden	3:07.06		Q
2	1	Nikita Kryukov	Russia	3:07.23	+0.17	Q
3	21	Len Väljas	Canada	3:07.74	+0.68	
4	10	Andrew Newell	United States	3:08.12	+1.06	
5	11	Sebastian Eisenlauer	Germany	3:09.41	+2.35	
6	30	Dakota Blackhorse-von Jess	United States	3:09.96	+2.90	

==== Quarterfinal 2 ====
Rank	Seed	Athlete	Country	Time	Deficit	Note
1	4	Ueli Schnider	Switzerland	3:05.75		Q
2	7	Ristomatti Hakola	Finland	3:06.26	+0.51	Q
3	27	Maicol Rastelli	Italy	3:06.46	+0.71	
4	24	Dominik Baldauf	Austria	3:06.94	+1.19	
5	17	Carl Quicklund	Sweden	3:07.03	+1.28	
6	14	Matias Strandvall	Finland	3:11.62	+5.87	

==== Quarterfinal 3 ====
Rank	Seed	Athlete	Country	Time	Deficit	Note
1	15	Federico Pellegrino	Italy	3:03.91		Q
2	5	Alex Harvey	Canada	3:04.18	+0.27	Q
3	6	Calle Halfvarsson	Sweden	3:04.57	+0.66	
4	26	Alexey Petukhov	Russia	3:05.21	+1.30	
5	25	Hiroyuki Miyazawa	Japan	3:07.01	+3.10	
6	16	Gianluca Cologna	Switzerland	3:21.28	+17.37	

==== Quarterfinal 4 ====
Rank	Seed	Athlete	Country	Time	Deficit	Note
1	2	Ola Vigen Hattestad	Norway	3:03.94		Q
2	12	Toni Ketelä	Finland	3:05.29	+1.35	Q
3	29	Sergey Ustiugov	Russia	3:05.75	+1.81	
4	19	Peeter Kümmel	Estonia	3:07.00	+3.06	
5	9	Anssi Pentsinen	Finland	3:09.25	+5.31	
6	22	Tim Tscharnke	Germany	3:17.29	+13.35	

==== Quarterfinal 5 ====
Rank	Seed	Athlete	Country	Time	Deficit	Note
1	3	Tomas Northug	Norway	3:00.42		Q
2	18	Petter Northug	Norway	3:00.51	+0.09	Q
3	13	Eirik Brandsdal	Norway	3:01.13	+0.71	q
4	28	Simeon Hamilton	United States	3:03.16	+2.74	q
5	8	Jovian Hediger	Switzerland	3:03.67	+3.25	
6	23	Nikolay Chebotko	Kazakhstan	3:08.28	+7.86	

=== Semifinals ===
The semifinals were started at 16:35.

==== Semifinal 1 ====
Rank	Seed	Athlete	Country	Time	Deficit	Note
1	1	Nikita Kryukov	Russia	3:05.89		Q
2	15	Federico Pellegrino	Italy	3:06.03	+0.14	Q
3	20	Teodor Peterson	Sweden	3:06.66	+0.77	
4	4	Ueli Schnider	Switzerland	3:06.94	+1.05	
5	7	Ristomatti Hakola	Finland	3:08.07	+2.18	
6	28	Simeon Hamilton	United States	3:14.03	+8.14	

==== Semifinal 2 ====
Rank	Seed	Athlete	Country	Time	Deficit	Note
1	2	Ola Vigen Hattestad	Norway	3:02.35		Q
2	3	Tomas Northug	Norway	3:03.07	+0.72	Q
3	18	Petter Northug	Norway	3:03.34	+0.99	q
4	5	Alex Harvey	Canada	3:03.51	+1.16	q
5	12	Toni Ketelä	Finland	3:05.08	+2.73	
6	13	Eirik Brandsdal	Norway	3:08.61	+6.26	

=== Final ===
The final was held at 17:10.

Rank	Seed	Athlete	Country	Time	Deficit	Note
1st place, gold medalist(s)	18	Petter Northug	Norway	3:02.35		
2nd place, silver medalist(s)	5	Alex Harvey	Canada	3:02.40	+0.05	
3rd place, bronze medalist(s)	2	Ola Vigen Hattestad	Norway	3:02.70	+0.35	
4	1	Nikita Kryukov	Russia	3:02.73	+0.38	
5	15	Federico Pellegrino	Italy	3:03.02	+0.67	
6	3	Tomas Northug	Norway	3:19.63	+17.28	
