= Andreas Veerpalu =

Estonian cross-country skier (born 1994)

Personal information
- Born: 24 May 1994 (age 30); Otepää, Estonia

Sport
- Country: Estonia
- Sport: Cross-country skiing

Andreas Veerpalu (born 24 May 1994) is an Estonian cross-country skier who competes internationally.

He represented Estonia at the 2018 Winter Olympics.

On 27 February 2019, during the FIS Nordic World Ski Championships 2019, Veerpalu was arrested along with four other skiers, Estonia's Karel Tammjärv, Kazakhstan's Alexey Poltoranin and Austrians Max Hauke and Dominik Baldauf, on suspicion of using blood doping assisted by German sports doctor Mark Schmidt. On release from police custody both Estonians admitted using blood doping.

== Personal ==
Andreas is the son of former Estonian cross-country skier, Andrus Veerpalu. His sister Anette is also a cross-country skier for Estonia.
