= FIS Nordic World Ski Championships 2019 – Men's 4 × 10 kilometre relay =

Men's 4 × 10 kilometre relay at the FIS Nordic World Ski Championships 2019
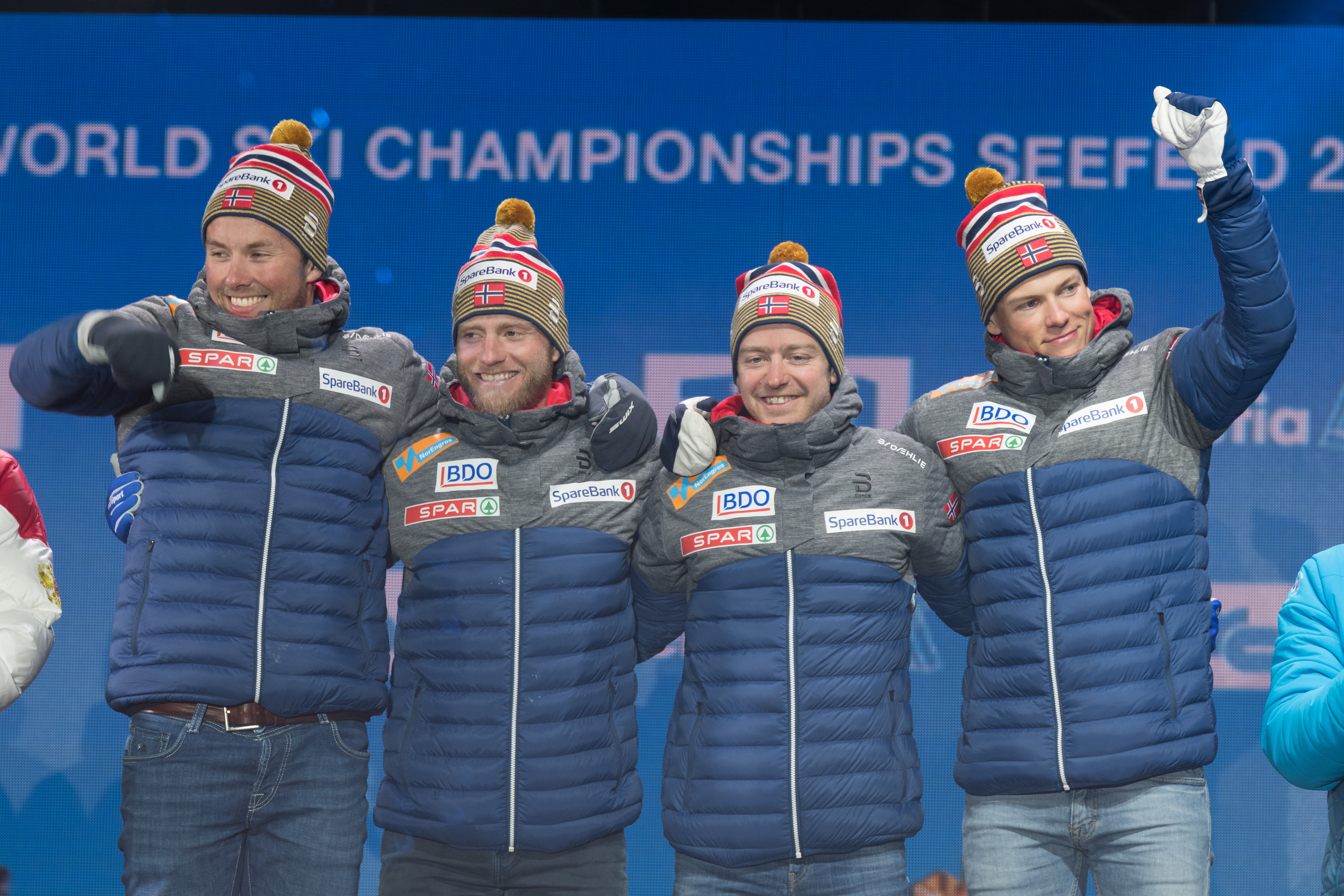
- Team Norway — gold medalists
- Location: Seefeld in Tirol, Austria
- Dates: 1 March
- Competitors: 56 from 14 nations
- Teams: 14
- Winning time: 1:42:32.1

Medalists
gold medal	Emil Iversen; Martin Johnsrud Sundby; Sjur Røthe; Johannes Høsflot Klæbo	Norway
silver medal	Andrey Larkov; Alexander Bessmertnykh; Alexander Bolshunov; Sergey Ustiugov	Russia
bronze medal	Adrien Backscheider; Maurice Manificat; Clément Parisse; Richard Jouve	France

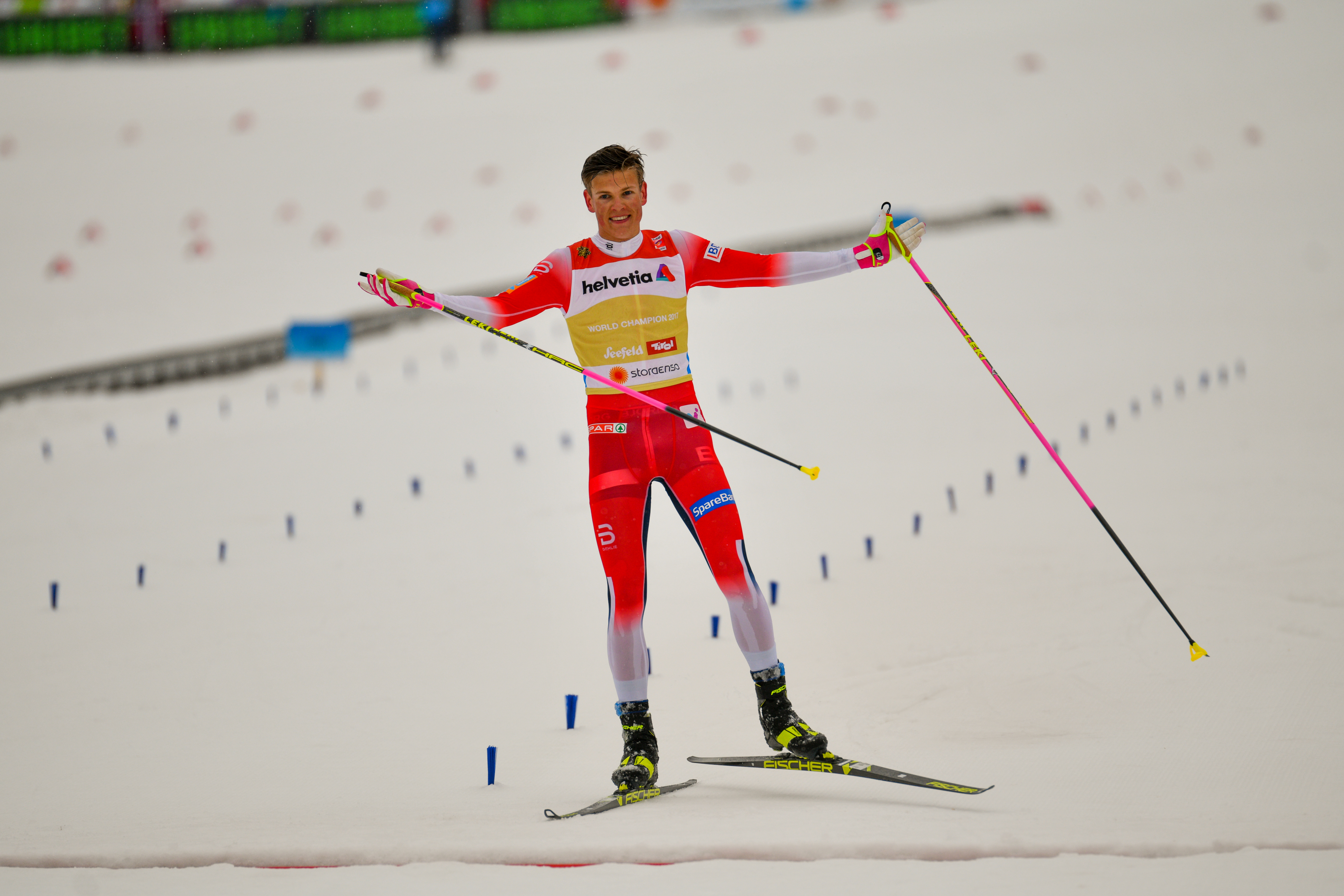
Johannes Høsflot Klæbo claims gold for Norway

The Men's 4 × 10 kilometre relay competition at the FIS Nordic World Ski Championships 2019 was held on 1 March 2019.

== Results ==
The race was started at 13:15.

Rank	Bib	Country	Athletes	Time	Deficit
1st place, gold medalist(s)	1	Norway	Emil Iversen; Martin Johnsrud Sundby; Sjur Røthe; Johannes Høsflot Klæbo	1:42:32.1; 26:39.1; 26:06.5; 24:18.1; 25:28.4	
2nd place, silver medalist(s)	2	Russia	Andrey Larkov; Alexander Bessmertnykh; Alexander Bolshunov; Sergey Ustiugov	1:43:10.9; 26:38.8; 26:08.1; 24:16.8; 26:07.2	+38.8
3rd place, bronze medalist(s)	3	France	Adrien Backscheider; Maurice Manificat; Clément Parisse; Richard Jouve	1:43:33.1; 26:45.3; 26:35.2; 24:07.8; 26:04.8	+1:01.0
4	4	Finland	Ristomatti Hakola; Iivo Niskanen; Matti Heikkinen; Perttu Hyvärinen	1:43:34.9; 26:47.3; 25:58.7; 24:34.7; 26:14.2	+1:02.8
5	5	Sweden	Oskar Svensson; Calle Halfvarsson; Jens Burman; Viktor Thorn	1:44:11.6; 26:45.2; 26:27.6; 24:57.3; 26:01.5	+1:39.5
6	6	Germany	Sebastian Eisenlauer; Andreas Katz; Florian Notz; Jonas Dobler	1:44:20.4; 26:39.5; 26:45.9; 25:18.5; 25:36.5	+1:48.3
7	8	Kazakhstan	Denis Volotka; Olzhas Klimin; Vitaliy Pukhkalo; Yevgeniy Velichko	1:44:21.0; 26:46.9; 27:23.0; 24:34.9; 25:36.2	+1:48.9
8	11	Switzerland	Ueli Schnider; Jonas Baumann; Dario Cologna; Toni Livers	1:44:22.0; 26:53.9; 27:14.4; 24:30.6; 25:43.1	+1:49.9
9	12	United States	Erik Bjornsen; Scott Patterson; David Norris; Simi Hamilton	1:46:38.5; 26:44.4; 27:09.6; 26:19.3; 26:25.2	+4:06.4
10	7	Italy	Maicol Rastelli; Federico Pellegrino; Giandomenico Salvadori; Francesco De Fabiani	1:47:14.8; 26:55.5; 27:13.8; 27:13.4; 25:52.1	+4:42.7
11	10	Czech Republic	Michal Novák; Miroslav Rypl; Adam Fellner; Petr Knop	1:49:05.9; 26:48.1; 28:47.6; 26:53.2; 26:37.0	+6:33.8
12	9	Canada	Alex Harvey; Scott James Hill; Evan Palmer-Charrette; Len Väljas	1:49:37.6; 26:46.9; 28:57.8; 26:43.9; 27:09.0	+7:05.5
13	13	China	Shang Jincai; Zhu Mingliang; Bao Lin; Wang Qiang	LAP; 28:49.6; 30:23.9	
14	14	Ukraine	Oleksii Krasovskyi; Yan Kostruba; Ruslan Perekhoda; Dmytro Drahun	LAP; 28:47.3	
