= Miroslav Rypl =

Czech cross-country skier

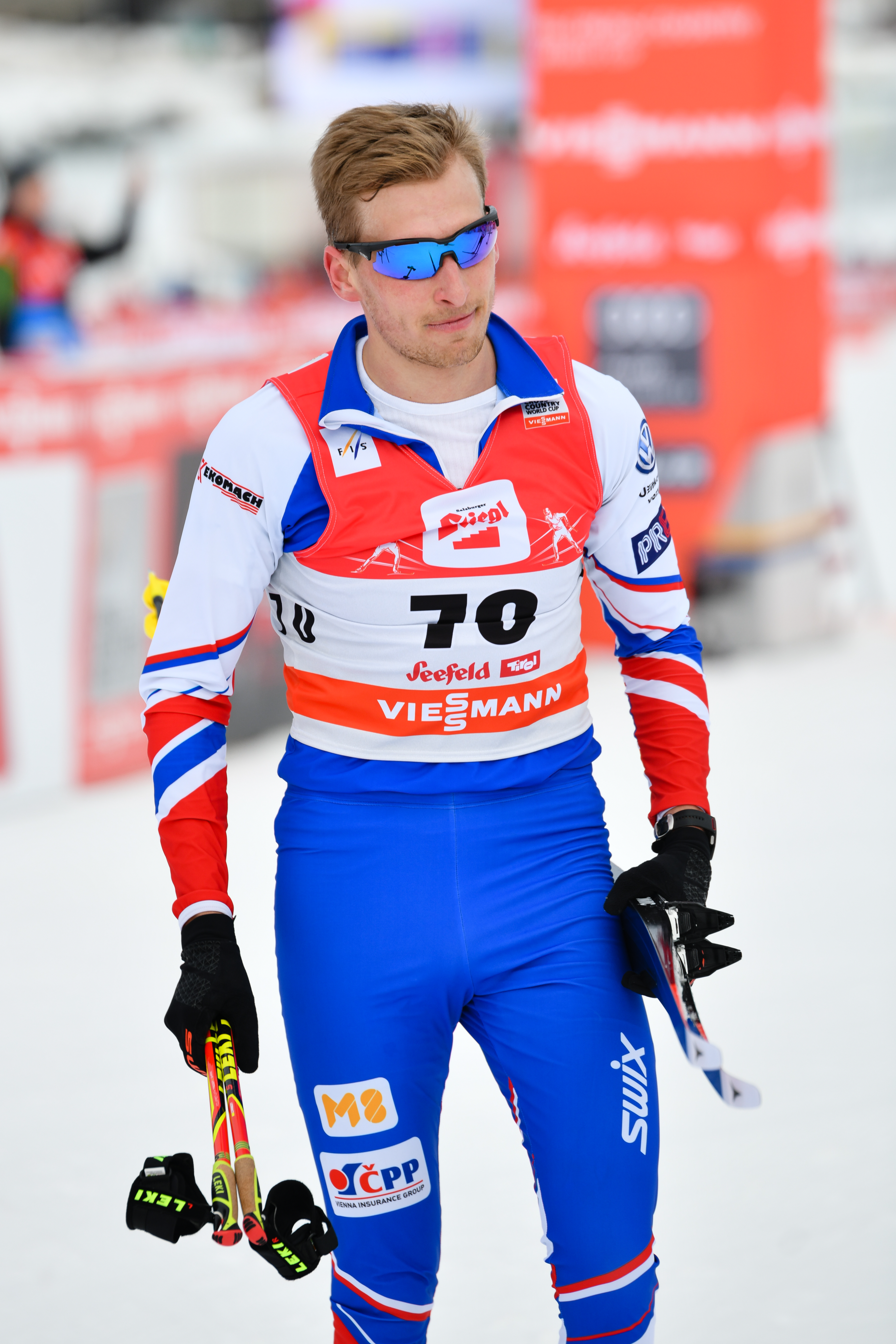

Personal information
- Nationality: Czech
- Born: 17 March 1992 (age 33)

Sport
- Sport: Cross-country skiing

Miroslav Rypl (born 17 March 1992) is a Czech cross-country skier. He competed in the 2018 Winter Olympics.
