= Denis Volotka =

Kazakhstani cross-country skier (born 1985)

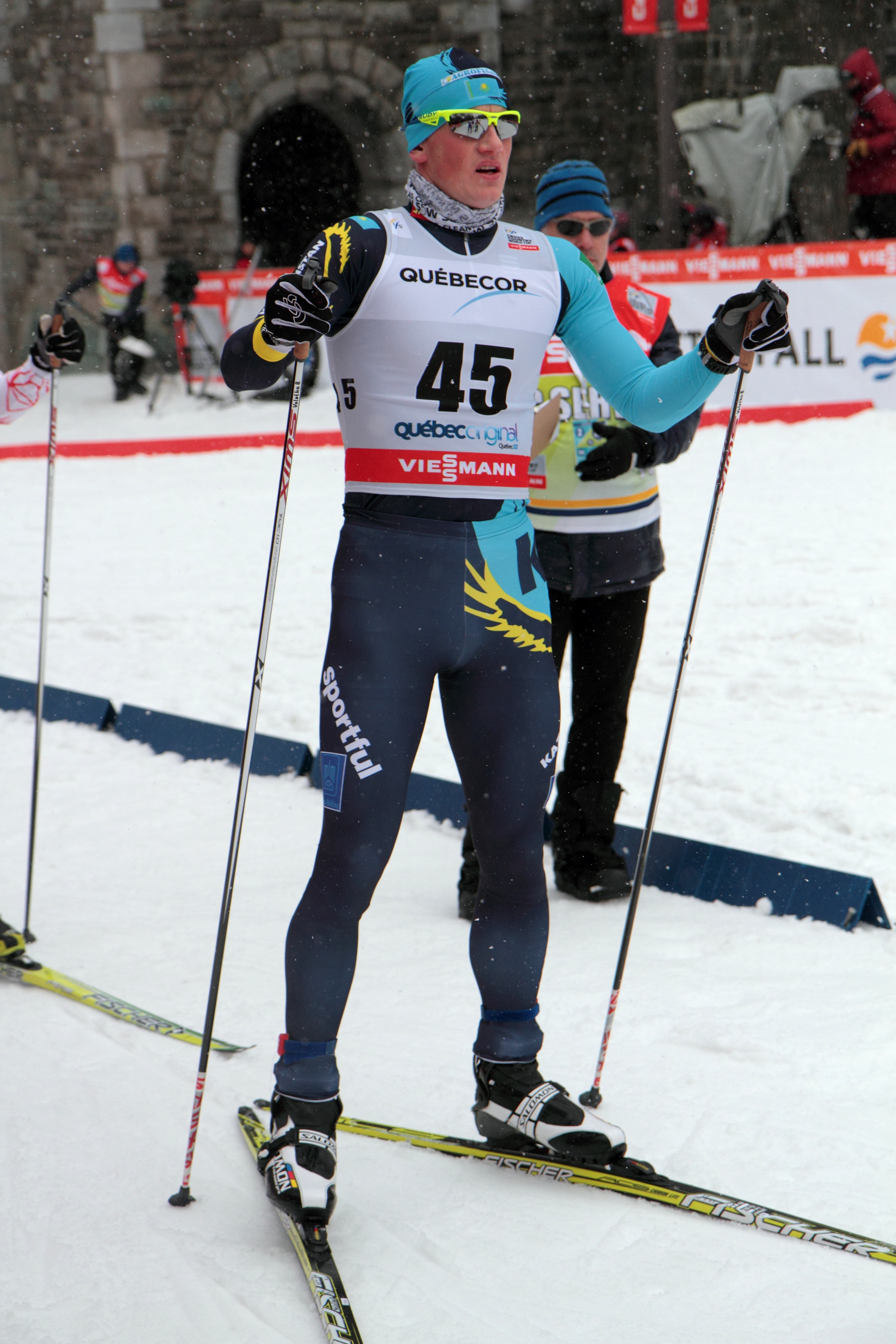
- Volotka in 2012

Personal information
- Born: 10 October 1985 (age 40) Burabay, Burabay District, Kazakh SSR, Soviet Union
- Height: 1.85 m (6 ft 1 in)
- Weight: 83 kg (183 lb)

Sport
- Country: Kazakhstan
- Sport: Cross-country skiing

Denis Vladimirovich Volotka (Russian: Денис Владимирович Волотка) (born 10 October 1985) is a cross country skier from Kazakhstan. He competed for Kazakhstan at the 2014 Winter Olympics in the cross country skiing events. He also competed for Kazakhstan at the 2018 Winter Olympics in cross-country skiing events.
