= FIS Nordic World Ski Championships 2019 – Men's 30 kilometre pursuit =

Men's 30 kilometre pursuit at the FIS Nordic World Ski Championships 2019
- Location: Seefeld in Tirol, Austria
- Dates: 23 February
- Competitors: 73 from 31 nations
- Winning time: 1:10:21.8

Medalists
gold medal	Sjur Røthe	Norway
silver medal	Alexander Bolshunov	Russia
bronze medal	Martin Johnsrud Sundby	Norway

The Men's 30 kilometre pursuit competition at the FIS Nordic World Ski Championships 2019 was held on 23 February 2019.

== Results ==
The race was started at 12:30.

Rank	Bib	Athlete	Country	Time	Deficit
1st place, gold medalist(s)	3	Sjur Røthe	Norway	1:10:21.8	
2nd place, silver medalist(s)	2	Alexander Bolshunov	Russia	1:10:21.9	+0.1
3rd place, bronze medalist(s)	4	Martin Johnsrud Sundby	Norway	1:10:22.5	+0.7
4	5	Iivo Niskanen	Finland	1:10:34.1	+12.3
5	13	Clément Parisse	France	1:10:42.5	+20.7
6	15	Alex Harvey	Canada	1:11:20.7	+58.9
7	12	Andrew Musgrave	Great Britain	1:11:22.1	+1:00.3
8	19	Adrien Backscheider	France	1:11:25.4	+1:03.6
9	9	Sergey Ustiugov	Russia	1:11:31.2	+1:09.4
10	23	Jens Burman	Sweden	1:11:34.6	+1:12.8
11	16	Alexey Poltoranin	Kazakhstan	1:11:45.1	+1:23.3
12	33	Matti Heikkinen	Finland	1:12:10.4	+1:48.6
13	6	Andrey Melnichenko	Russia	1:12:14.8	+1:53.0
14	14	Dario Cologna	Switzerland	1:12:18.2	+1:56.4
15	20	Daniel Rickardsson	Sweden	1:12:38.2	+2:16.4
16	22	Giandomenico Salvadori	Italy	1:12:40.6	+2:18.8
17	7	Evgeniy Belov	Russia	1:12:42.8	+2:21.0
18	18	Florian Notz	Germany	1:13:15.0	+2:53.2
19	17	Jules Lapierre	France	1:13:20.2	+2:58.4
20	21	Keishin Yoshida	Japan	1:13:20.5	+2:58.7
21	32	Irineu Esteve Altimiras	Andorra	1:13:20.6	+2:58.8
22	8	Denis Spitsov	Russia	1:13:51.2	+3:29.4
23	37	Perttu Hyvärinen	Finland	1:13:59.1	+3:37.3
24	36	Naoto Baba	Japan	1:14:02.1	+3:40.3
25	24	Jonas Dobler	Germany	1:14:05.7	+3:43.9
26	39	Jonas Baumann	Switzerland	1:14:06.2	+3:44.4
27	30	Karel Tammjärv	Estonia	1:14:23.9	+4:02.1
28	43	Andreas Katz	Germany	1:14:44.0	+4:22.2
29	25	Oskar Svensson	Sweden	1:14:54.9	+4:33.1
30	1	Johannes Høsflot Klæbo	Norway	1:14:57.1	+4:35.3
31	11	Emil Iversen	Norway	1:14:58.7	+4:36.9
32	28	Scott Patterson	United States	1:15:02.4	+4:40.6
33	54	Antti Ojansivu	Finland	1:15:05.5	+4:43.7
34	27	Lucas Bögl	Germany	1:15:08.1	+4:46.3
35	10	Jean-Marc Gaillard	France	1:15:08.2	+4:46.4
36	31	Stefano Gardener	Italy	1:15:08.4	+4:46.6
37	44	Simone Daprà	Italy	1:15:08.5	+4:46.7
38	35	David Norris	United States	1:15:16.2	+4:54.4
39	55	Snorri Einarsson	Iceland	1:15:33.6	+5:11.8
40	46	Paul Constantin Pepene	Romania	1:15:57.7	+5:35.9
41	58	Imanol Rojo	Spain	1:16:18.6	+5:56.8
42	52	Yevgeniy Velichko	Kazakhstan	1:16:33.0	+6:11.2
43	29	Beda Klee	Switzerland	1:16:33.2	+6:11.4
44	49	Yury Astapenka	Belarus	1:16:34.1	+6:12.3
45	48	Evan Palmer-Charrette	Canada	1:16:34.2	+6:12.4
46	50	Bernhard Tritscher	Austria	1:16:34.5	+6:12.7
47	42	Björn Sandström	Sweden	1:16:37.9	+6:16.1
48	41	Vitaliy Pukhkalo	Kazakhstan	1:16:40.4	+6:18.6
49	34	Kyle Bratrud	United States	1:16:41.4	+6:19.6
50	40	Hiroyuki Miyazawa	Japan	1:17:05.1	+6:43.3
51	60	Adam Fellner	Czech Republic	1:17:27.2	+7:05.4
52	64	Thomas Hjalmar Westgård	Ireland	1:18:07.4	+7:45.6
53	51	Petr Knop	Czech Republic	1:18:08.6	+7:46.8
54	38	Adam Martin	United States	1:18:09.2	+7:47.4
55	45	Olzhas Klimin	Kazakhstan	1:18:09.2	+7:47.4
56	47	Kaichi Naruse	Japan	1:19:11.0	+8:49.2
57	53	Andreas Veerpalu	Estonia	1:20:17.3	+9:55.5
58	56	Scott Hill	Canada	1:20:20.6	+9:58.8
59	63	Indulis Bikše	Latvia	Lapped	
60	69	Thibaut De Marre	Belgium	Lapped	
61	57	Oleksiy Krasovsky	Ukraine	Lapped	
62	67	Hamza Dursun	Turkey	Lapped	
63	65	Bao Lin	China	Lapped	
64	62	Kaarel Kasper Kõrge	Estonia	Lapped	
65	59	Jonáš Bešťák	Czech Republic	Lapped	
66	61	Kamil Bury	Poland	Lapped	
67	68	Ömer Ayçiçek	Turkey	Lapped	
68	71	Franco Dal Farra	Argentina	Lapped	
69	74	Alex Vanias	Greece	Lapped	
70	70	Albert Jónsson	Iceland	Lapped	
71	73	Yunus Emre Fırat	Turkey	Lapped	
72	72	Marco Dal Farra	Argentina	Lapped	
	66	Tadevos Poghosyan	Armenia	Did not finish	
	26	Toni Livers	Switzerland	Did not start	
