= FIS Nordic World Ski Championships 2015 – Men's 50 kilometre classical =

Men's 50 kilometre classical at the FIS Nordic World Ski Championships 2015
- Date: 1 March 2015
- Competitors: 57 from 21 nations
- Winning time: 2:26:02.1

Medalists
gold medal	Petter Northug	Norway
silver medal	Lukáš Bauer	Czech Republic
bronze medal	Johan Olsson	Sweden

The Men's 50 kilometre classical event of the FIS Nordic World Ski Championships 2015 was held on 1 March 2015.

== Results ==
The race was started at 13:30.

Rank	Bib	Athlete	Country	Time	Deficit
1st place, gold medalist(s)	4	Petter Northug	Norway	2:26:02.1	
2nd place, silver medalist(s)	29	Lukáš Bauer	Czech Republic	2:26:03.8	+1.7
3rd place, bronze medalist(s)	22	Johan Olsson	Sweden	2:26:04.1	+2.0
4	6	Maxim Vylegzhanin	Russia	2:26:04.9	+2.8
5	9	Alex Harvey	Canada	2:26:08.1	+6.0
6	1	Dario Cologna	Switzerland	2:26:11.6	+9.5
7	8	Alexey Poltoranin	Kazakhstan	2:26:12.2	+10.1
8	13	Didrik Tønseth	Norway	2:26:12.2	+10.1
9	12	Daniel Rickardsson	Sweden	2:26:16.7	+14.6
10	14	Alexander Bessmertnykh	Russia	2:26:19.6	+17.5
11	2	Martin Johnsrud Sundby	Norway	2:26:22.8	+20.7
12	17	Dietmar Nöckler	Italy	2:26:23.7	+21.6
13	5	Niklas Dyrhaug	Norway	2:26:24.3	+22.2
14	7	Maurice Manificat	France	2:26:24.4	+22.3
15	25	Anders Södergren	Sweden	2:26:26.1	+24.0
16	24	Martin Jakš	Czech Republic	2:26:35.7	+33.6
17	36	Keishin Yoshida	Japan	2:27:31.3	+1:29.2
18	26	Jonas Baumann	Switzerland	2:27:38.0	+1:35.9
19	40	Graeme Killick	Canada	2:27:46.2	+1:44.1
20	10	Matti Heikkinen	Finland	2:27:51.4	+1:49.3
21	44	Algo Kärp	Estonia	2:27:52.9	+1:50.8
22	35	Giorgio Di Centa	Italy	2:28:17.4	+2:15.3
23	38	Mattia Pellegrin	Italy	2:28:25.7	+2:23.6
24	3	Calle Halfvarsson	Sweden	2:28:59.0	+2:56.9
25	23	Lars Nelson	Sweden	2:28:59.6	+2:57.5
26	54	Aivar Rehemaa	Estonia	2:29:05.1	+3:03.0
27	19	Andrey Larkov	Russia	2:29:15.6	+3:13.5
28	27	Bernhard Tritscher	Austria	2:29:17.4	+3:15.3
29	31	Sami Jauhojärvi	Finland	2:29:19.6	+3:17.5
30	20	Ivan Babikov	Canada	2:29:50.5	+3:48.4
31	34	Noah Hoffman	United States	2:29:55.6	+3:53.5
32	15	Francesco De Fabiani	Italy	2:30:10.7	+4:08.6
33	46	Takatsugu Uda	Japan	2:30:27.4	+4:25.3
34	30	Andrew Musgrave	Great Britain	2:32:10.9	+6:08.8
35	53	Raido Ränkel	Estonia	2:32:17.5	+6:15.4
36	45	Aleš Razym	Czech Republic	2:32:36.9	+6:34.8
37	43	Martin Bajčičák	Slovakia	2:32:39.3	+6:37.2
38	47	Ristomatti Hakola	Finland	2:33:07.2	+7:05.1
39	39	Akira Lenting	Japan	2:34:59.4	+8:57.3
40	41	Hiroyuki Miyazawa	Japan	2:35:37.9	+9:35.8
41	50	Sebastian Eisenlauer	Germany	2:36:28.1	+10:26.0
42	33	Thomas Bing	Germany	2:40:14.2	+14:12.1
43	48	Erik Bjornsen	United States	2:40:41.2	+14:39.1
44	52	Sergey Cherepanov	Kazakhstan	2:41:09.8	+15:07.7
45	55	Yerdos Akhmadiyev	Kazakhstan	2:47:49.3	+21:47.2
	11	Stanislav Volzhentsev	Russia	DNF	
	16	Jean-Marc Gaillard	France	DNF	
	18	Tim Tscharnke	Germany	DNF	
	21	Lari Lehtonen	Finland	DNF	
	28	Florian Notz	Germany	DNF	
	37	Matthew Gelso	United States	DNF	
	42	Imanol Rojo	Spain	DNF	
	49	Mark Starostin	Kazakhstan	DNF	
	51	Karel Tammjärv	Estonia	DNF	
	56	Oleksiy Krasovsky	Ukraine	DNF	
	57	Andrew Pohl	New Zealand	DNF	
	58	Callum Watson	Australia	DNF	
	32	Kris Freeman	United States	DNS	
	59	Paul Kovacs	Australia	DNS	
