= Dietmar Nöckler =

Italian cross-country skier

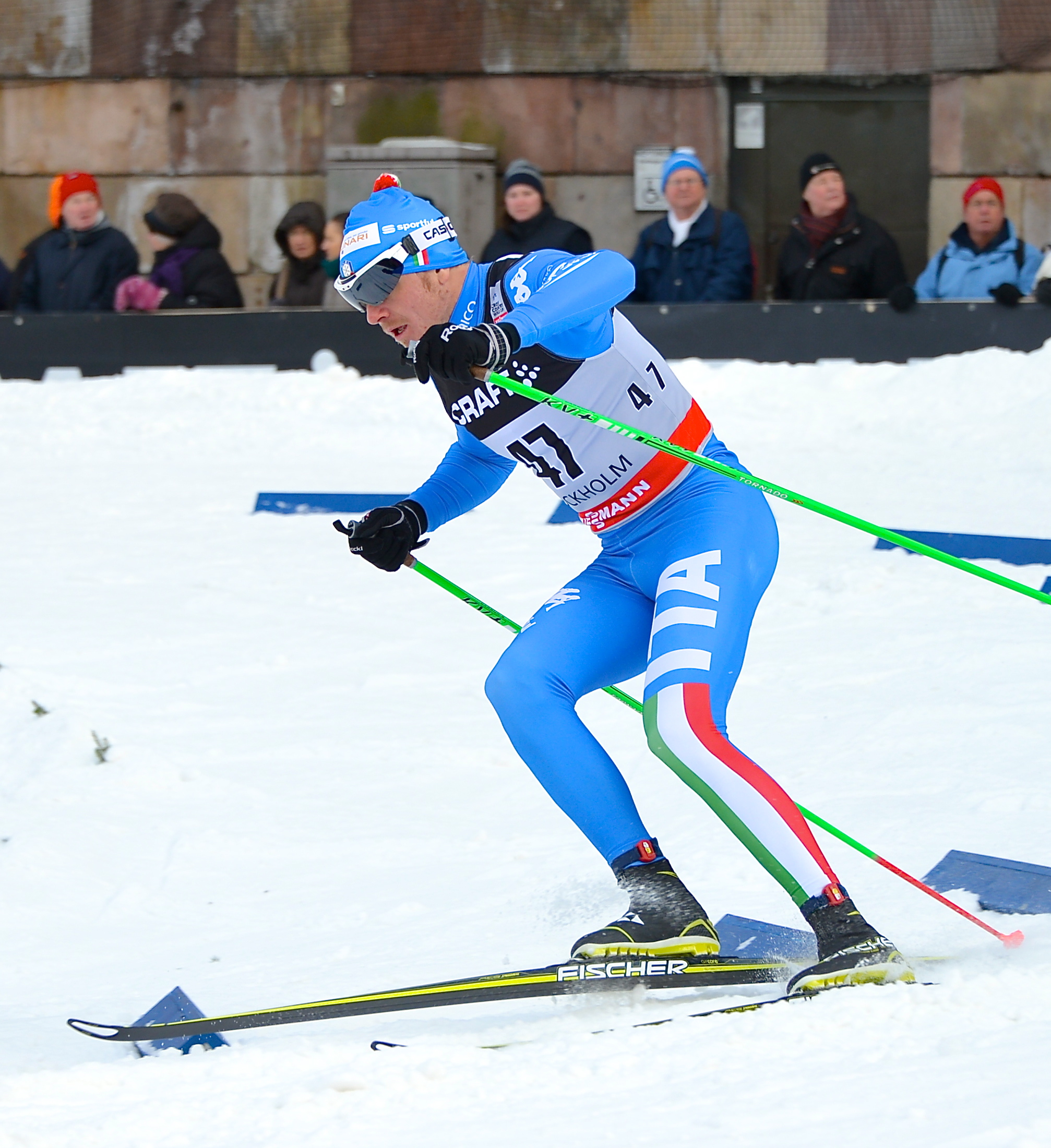
- Dietmar Nöckler at the Royal Palace Sprint, Stockholm, 2013

Personal information
- Nationality: Italy
- Born: 29 September 1988 (age 37) Bruneck, Italy
- Height: 1.81 m (5 ft 11 in)

Sport
- Sport: Skiing
- Club: G.S. Fiamme Oro

World Cup career
- Seasons: 16 – (2009–present)
- Indiv. starts: 181
- Indiv. podiums: 0
- Team starts: 18
- Team podiums: 7
- Team wins: 3
- Overall titles: 0 – (34th in 2015)
- Discipline titles: 0
Medal record
Men's cross-country skiing
Representing Italy
World Championships
Silver medal – second place	2017 Lahti	Team sprint
Bronze medal – third place	2015 Falun	Team sprint
- Updated on 21 January 2024

Dietmar Nöckler (born 29 September 1988) is an Italian cross-country skier. He has been in a relationship with fellow cross-country skier Ilaria Debertolis since 2009.

Nöckler is an athlete of the G.S. Fiamme Oro.

== Cross-country skiing results ==
All results are sourced from the International Ski Federation (FIS).

=== Olympic Games ===
Year	Age	15 km individual	30 km skiathlon	50 km mass start	Sprint	4 × 10 km relay	Team sprint
2014	25	32	—	—	37	5	11
2018	29	DNF	37	21	—	—	5

=== World Championships ===
- 2 medals – (1 silver, 1 bronze)

Year	Age	15 km individual	30 km skiathlon	50 km mass start	Sprint	4 × 10 km relay	Team sprint
2013	24	—	28	18	35	4	—
2015	26	—	—	12	—	6	Bronze
2017	28	24	—	—	—	8	Silver
2023	34	—	—	20	—	9	—

=== World Cup ===
==== Season standings ====
Season	Age	Discipline standings			Ski Tour standings				
Season	Age	Overall	Distance	Sprint	Nordic Opening	Tour de Ski	Ski Tour 2020	World Cup Final	Ski Tour Canada
2009	20	NC	NC	NC	—N/a	—	—N/a	—	—N/a
2010	21	NC	NC	NC	—N/a	—	—N/a	—	—N/a
2011	22	NC	NC	NC	56	—	—N/a	—	—N/a
2012	23	103	92	64	33	48	—N/a	—	—N/a
2013	24	40	32	61	43	31	—N/a	13	—N/a
2014	25	103	71	79	DNF	DNF	—N/a	—	—N/a
2015	26	34	32	NC	44	21	—N/a	—N/a	—N/a
2016	27	70	50	NC	28	DNF	—N/a	—N/a	23
2017	28	60	47	NC	37	DNF	—N/a	13	—N/a
2018	29	91	58	NC	53	DNF	—N/a	46	—N/a
2019	30	110	75	NC	64	DNF	—N/a	—	—N/a
2020	31	NC	NC	—	—	—	—	—N/a	—N/a
2021	32	146	94	—	—	—	—N/a	—N/a	—N/a
2022	33	110	63	—	—N/a	—	—N/a	—N/a	—N/a
2023	34	134	79	NC	—N/a	27	—N/a	—N/a	—N/a

==== Team podiums ====
- 3 victories – (1 RL, 2 TS)
- 7 podiums – (3 RL, 4 TS)

No.	Season	Date	Location	Race	Level	Place	Teammate(s)
1	2014–15	18 January 2015	Otepää, Estonia	6 × 1.5 km Team Sprint F	World Cup	3rd	Pellegrino
2	2015–16	16 January 2016	Planica, Slovenia	6 × .1.2 km Team Sprint F	World Cup	1st	Pellegrino
3	2015–16	24 January 2016	Nové Město, Czech Republic	4 × 7.5 km Relay C/F	World Cup	3rd	De Fabiani / Clara / Pellegrino
4	2016–17	15 January 2017	Toblach, Italy	6 × 1.3 km Team Sprint F	World Cup	3rd	Pellegrino
5	2017–18	14 January 2018	Dresden, Germany	6 × 1.3 km Team Sprint F	World Cup	1st	Pellegrino
6	2022–23	5 February 2023	Toblach, Italy	4 × 7.5 km Relay C/F	World Cup	1st	De Fabiani / Daprà / Pellegrino
7	2023–24	21 January 2024	Oberhof, Germany	4 × 7.5 km Relay C/F	World Cup	2nd	Barp / Daprà / Pellegrino
