= Francesco De Fabiani =

Italian cross-country skier

Francesco de Fabiani
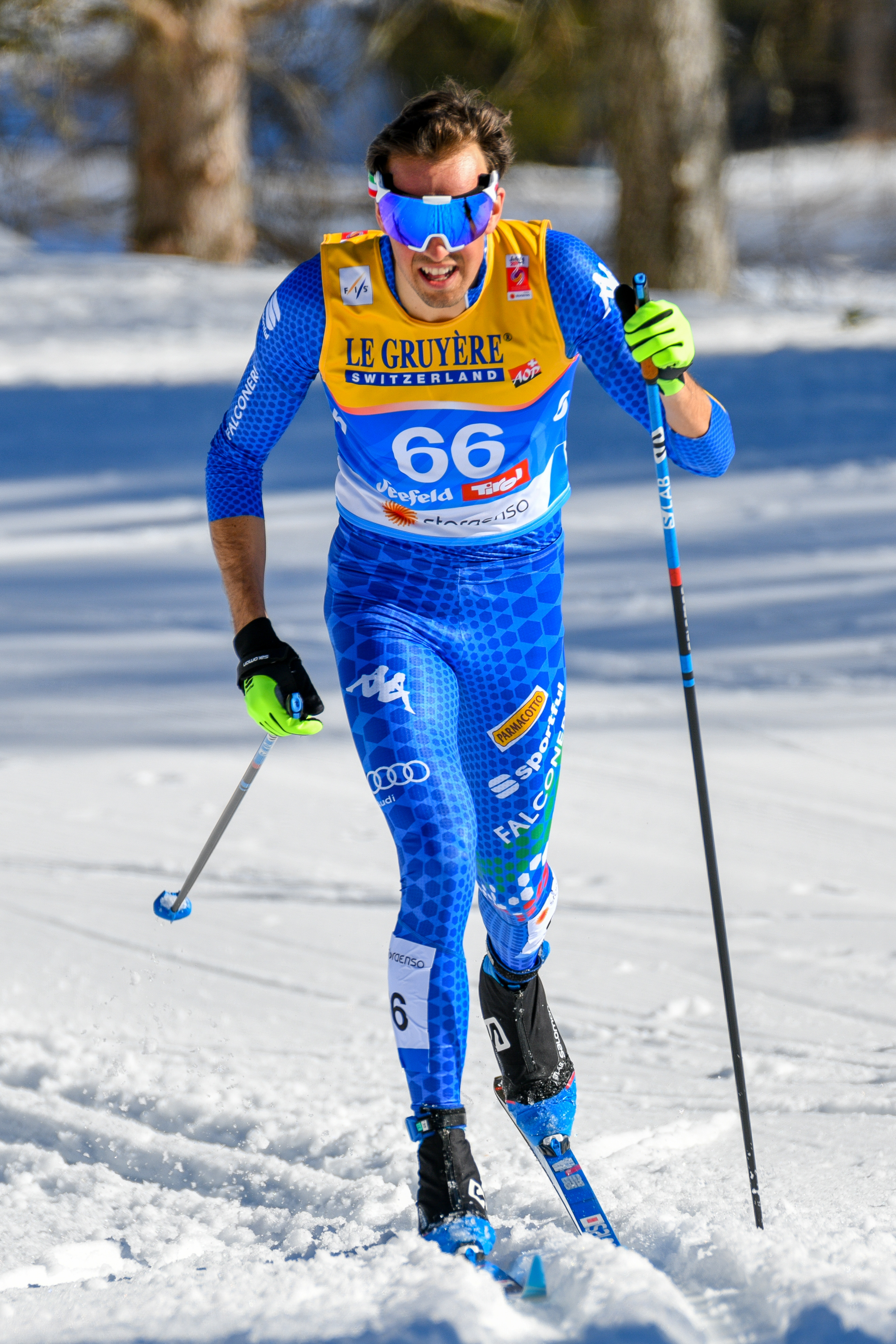
- De Fabiani in February 2019

Personal information
- Nationality: Italy
- Born: 21 April 1993 (age 33) Aosta, Italy
- Height: 1.80 m (5 ft 11 in)

Sport
- Sport: Skiing
- Club: C.S. Esercito

World Cup career
- Seasons: 11 – (2014–present)
- Indiv. starts: 198
- Indiv. podiums: 10
- Indiv. wins: 1
- Team starts: 18
- Team podiums: 6
- Team wins: 2
- Overall titles: 0 – (7th in 2019)
- Discipline titles: 2 – (2 U23: 2015, 2016)
Medal record
Men's cross-country skiing
Representing Italy
World Championships
Silver medal – second place	2023 Planica	Team sprint
Bronze medal – third place	2019 Seefeld	Team sprint
- Updated on 9 December 2023

Francesco De Fabiani (born 21 April 1993) is an Italian cross-country skier.

== Athletic career ==
De Fabiani had his first World Cup start during the 2013–14 season. His first event was the Tour de Ski 5 km Free prologue in Oberhof, Germany. He also competed for Italy at the 2014 Winter Olympics in the cross country skiing events. At the end of 2015 he was top ten in the overall statistics which is the best he has ever done.

De Fabiani had his international breakthrough during the 2014–15 season. This season he recorded his first World Cup victory in the 15 km classical event in Lahti. He also won the Helvetia U23 World Cup Ranking.

== Cross-country skiing results ==
All results are sourced from the International Ski Federation (FIS).

=== Olympic Games ===
Year	Age	15 km individual	30 km skiathlon	50 km mass start	Sprint	4 × 10 km relay	Team sprint
2014	20	30	21	25	—	—	—
2018	24	—	20	22	—	7	—
2022	28	18	8	—^{[a]}	51	8	8

^{a} Distance reduced to 30 km due to weather conditions.

=== World Championships ===
- 2 medals – (1 silver, 1 bronze)

Year	Age	15 km individual	30 km skiathlon	50 km mass start	Sprint	4 × 10 km relay	Team sprint
2015	21	—	40	32	—	6	—
2017	23	38	—	—	—	8	—
2019	25	20	—	14	8	10	Bronze
2021	27	—	—	—	30	—	5
2023	29	—	—	11	18	9	Silver

=== World Cup ===
==== Season titles ====
- 2 titles – (2 U23)

Season
Season	Discipline
2015	Under-23
2016	Under-23

==== Season standings ====
Season	Age	Discipline standings				Ski Tour standings				
Season	Age	Overall	Distance	Sprint	U23	Nordic Opening	Tour de Ski	Ski Tour 2020	World Cup Final	Ski Tour Canada
2014	20	NC	NC	NC	—N/a	—	DNF	—N/a	—	—N/a
2015	21	22	13	NC	1st place, gold medalist(s)	18	24	—N/a	—N/a	—N/a
2016	22	12	11	87	1st place, gold medalist(s)	4	9	—N/a	—N/a	19
2017	23	25	25	87	—N/a	14	14	—N/a	—	—N/a
2018	24	13	17	35	—N/a	43	DNF	—N/a	12	—N/a
2019	25	7	6	11	—N/a	12	9	—N/a	4	—N/a
2020	26	30	28	36	—N/a	32	DNF	13	—N/a	—N/a
2021	27	15	17	20	—N/a	20	15	—N/a	—N/a	—N/a
2022	28	26	18	37	—N/a	—N/a	25	—N/a	—N/a	—N/a
2023	29	25	15	59	—N/a	—N/a	14	—N/a	—N/a	—N/a

==== Individual podiums ====
- 1 victory – (1 WC)
- 10 podiums – (3 WC, 7 SWC)

No.	Season	Date	Location	Race	Level	Place
1	2014–15	8 March 2015	Lahti, Finland	15 km Individual C	World Cup	1st
2	2015–16	6 January 2016	Oberstdorf, Germany	15 km Mass Start C	Stage World Cup	3rd
3	2015–16	14 February 2016	Falun, Sweden	15 km Mass Start F	World Cup	2nd
4	2017–18	4 January 2018	Oberstdorf, Germany	15 km Mass Start F	Stage World Cup	3rd
5	2017–18	17 March 2018	Falun, Sweden	15 km Mass Start C	Stage World Cup	3rd
6	2018–19	2 January 2019	Oberstdorf, Germany	15 km Mass Start C	Stage World Cup	2nd
7	2018–19	5 January 2019	Val di Fiemme, Italy	15 km Mass Start C	Stage World Cup	2nd
8	2018–19	16 February 2019	Cogne, Italy	1.6 km Sprint F	World Cup	2nd
9	2020–21	8 January 2021	Val di Fiemme, Italy	15 km Mass Start C	Stage World Cup	2nd
10	2022–23	7 January 2023	Val di Fiemme, Italy	15 km Mass Start C	Stage World Cup	3rd

==== Team podiums ====
- 2 victories – (1 RL, 1 TS)
- 6 podiums – (2 RL, 4 TS)

No.	Season	Date	Location	Race	Level	Place	Teammate(s)
1	2015–16	24 January 2016	Nové Město, Czech Republic	4 × 7.5 km Relay C/F	World Cup	3rd	Nöckler / Clara / Pellegrino
2	2020–21	20 December 2020	(Germany) Dresden, Italy	6 × 1.3 km Team Sprint F	World Cup	3rd	Pellegrino
3	2020–21	7 February 2021	Ulricehamn, Sweden	6 × 1.5 km Team Sprint F	World Cup	1st	Pellegrino
4	2022–23	22 January 2023	Livigno, Italy	6 × 1.2 km Team Sprint F	World Cup	2nd	Pellegrino
5	2022–23	5 February 2023	Toblach, Italy	4 × 7.5 km Relay C/F	World Cup	1st	Nöckler / Daprà / Pellegrino
6	2022–23	24 March 2023	Lahti, Finland	6 × 1.4 km Team Sprint F	World Cup	2nd	Pellegrino
