= Jovian Hediger =

Swiss cross-country skier (born 1990)

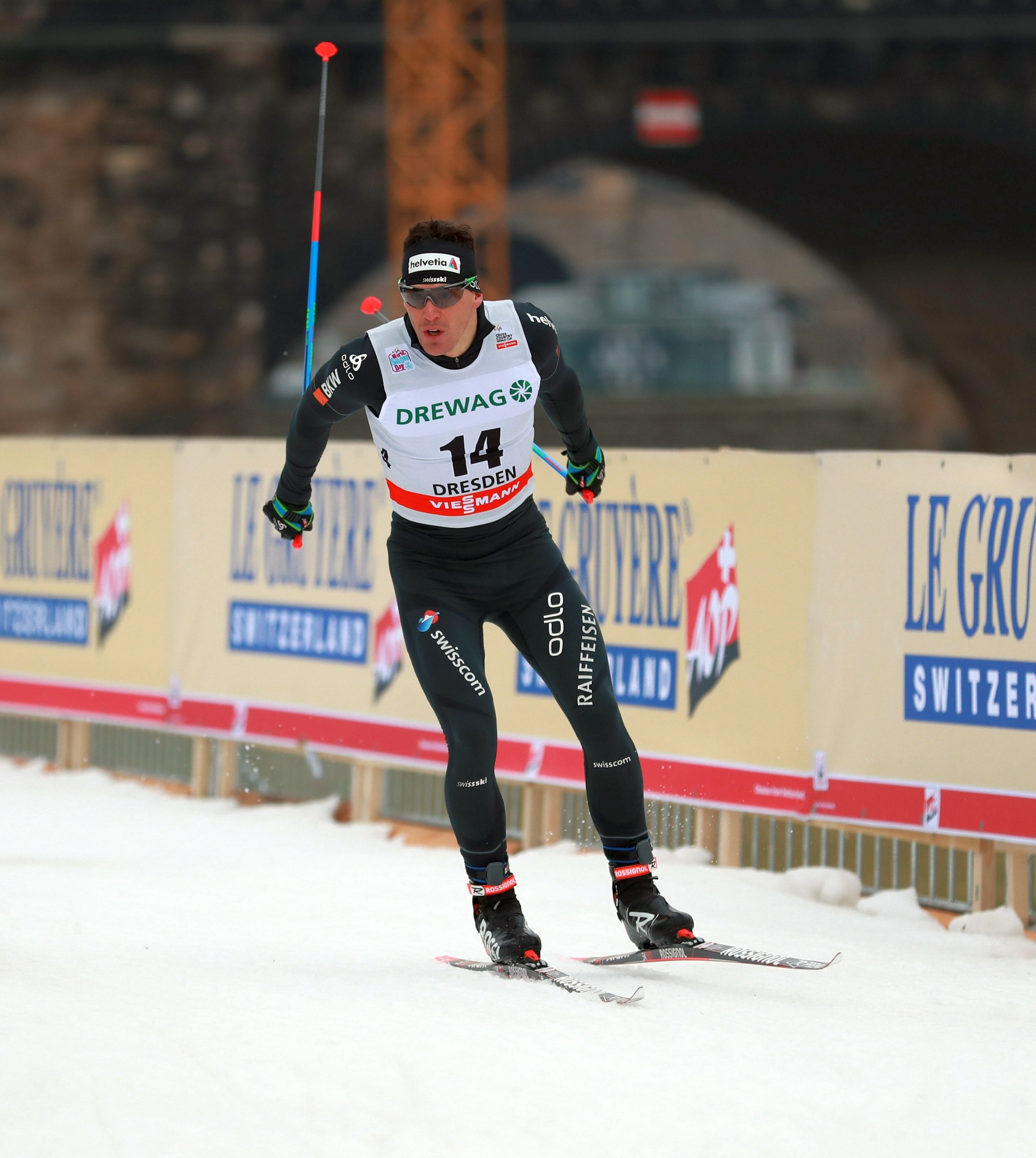
- Hediger in 2018

Personal information
- Nationality: Switzerland
- Born: 17 December 1990 (age 35) Reinach, Aargau, Switzerland

Sport
- Sport: Skiing
- Club: SC Bex

World Cup career
- Seasons: 13 – (2010–2022)
- Indiv. starts: 107
- Indiv. podiums: 0
- Team starts: 14
- Team podiums: 1
- Team wins: 0
- Overall titles: 0 – (41st in 2022)
- Discipline titles: 0
- Updated on 23 March 2022

Jovian Hediger (born December 17, 1990, in Reinach, Aargau) is a Swiss cross-country skier.

Hediger competed at the 2014 Winter Olympics for Switzerland. He placed 47th in the qualifying round in the sprint, failing to advance to the knockout stages.

As of April 2014, his best showing at the World Championships was 25th through the classical sprint event in 2013.

Hediger made his World Cup debut in December 2009. As of April 2014, his best finish is a sixth, in a freestyle sprint event at Toblach in 2013–14. His best World Cup overall finish is 45th, in 2020–21. His best World Cup finish in a discipline is 12th, in the 2020–21 Sprint Cup.

== Cross-country skiing results ==
All results are sourced from the International Ski Federation (FIS).

=== Olympic Games ===
Year	Age	15 km individual	30 km skiathlon	50 km mass start	Sprint	4 × 10 km relay	Team sprint
2014	23	—	—	—	47	—	—
2018	27	—	—	—	19	—	—
2022	31	—	—	—^{[a]}	22	—	8

^{a} Distance reduced to 30 km due to weather conditions.

=== World Championships ===
Year	Age	15 km individual	30 km skiathlon	50 km mass start	Sprint	4 × 10 km relay	Team sprint
2013	22	—	—	—	25	—	—
2015	24	—	—	—	21	—	—
2017	26	—	—	—	11	—	9
2019	28	—	—	—	35	—	11
2021	30	—	—	—	12	—	9

=== World Cup ===
==== Season standings ====
Season	Age	Discipline standings			Ski Tour standings				
Season	Age	Overall	Distance	Sprint	Nordic Opening	Tour de Ski	Ski Tour 2020	World Cup Final	Ski Tour Canada
2010	19	NC	—	NC	—N/a	—	—N/a	—	—N/a
2011	20	NC	—	NC	—	—	—N/a	—	—N/a
2012	21	141	—	86	—	—	—N/a	—	—N/a
2013	22	70	—	31	—	—	—N/a	—	—N/a
2014	23	69	NC	29	DNF	—	—N/a	—	—N/a
2015	24	106	NC	51	DNF	—	—N/a	—N/a	—N/a
2016	25	51	NC	20	DNF	DNF	—N/a	—N/a	DNF
2017	26	55	NC	21	—	DNF	—N/a	55	—N/a
2018	27	48	NC	19	DNF	DNF	—N/a	—	—N/a
2019	28	59	NC	27	DNF	DNF	—N/a	DNF	—N/a
2020	29	59	NC	23	DNF	DNF	—	—N/a	—N/a
2021	30	45	NC	12	DNF	DNF	—N/a	—N/a	—N/a
2022	31	41	NC	16	—N/a	DNF	—N/a	—N/a	—N/a

==== Team podiums ====
- 1 podium – (1 TS)

No.	Season	Date	Location	Race	Level	Place	Teammate
1	2020–21	7 February 2021	Ulricehamn, Sweden	6 × 1.5 km Team Sprint F	World Cup	2nd	Furger
