= Bernhard Tritscher =

Austrian cross-country skier

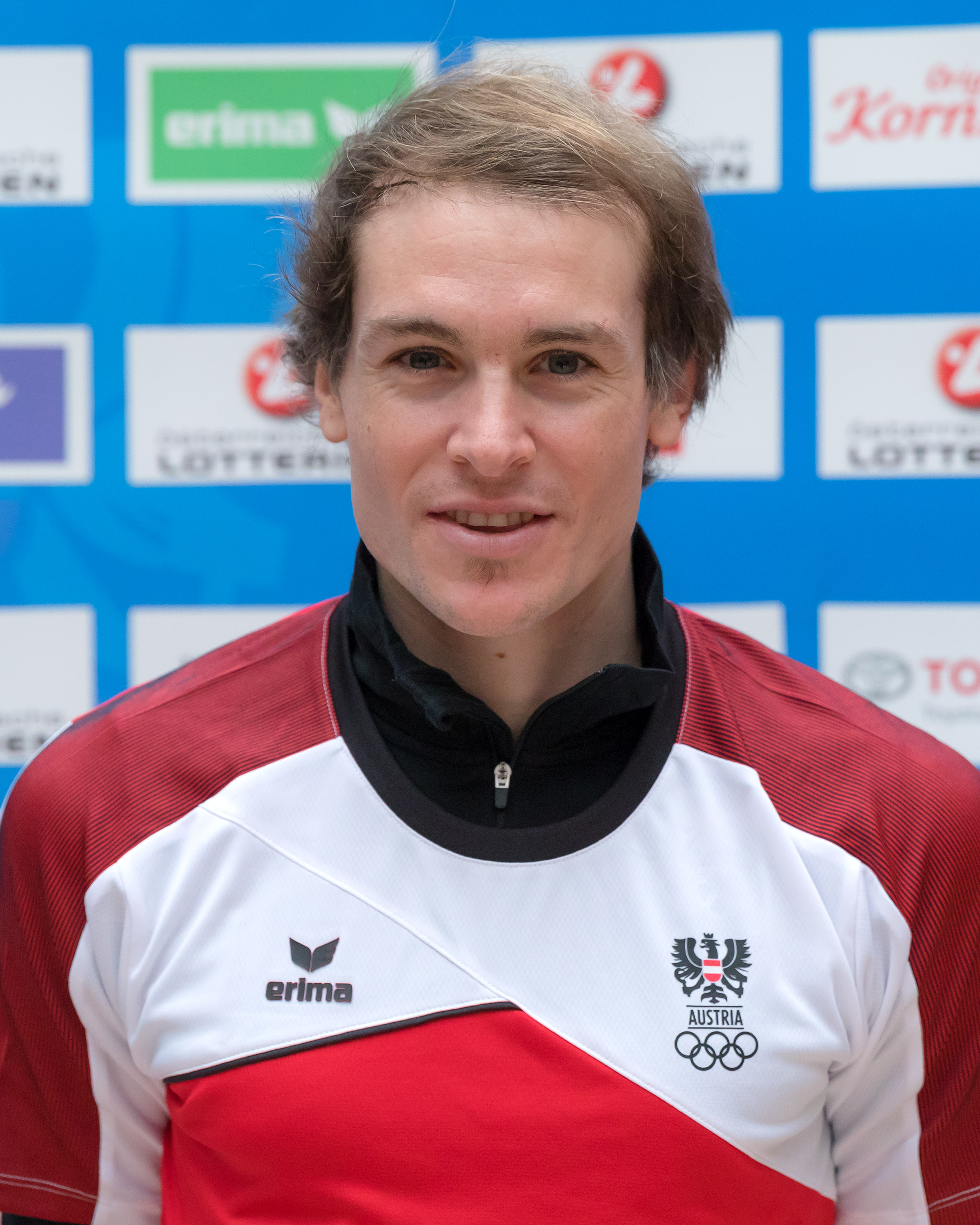
- Tritscher in 2018

Personal information
- Nationality: Austria
- Born: 25 April 1988 (age 38) Zell am See, Austria
- Height: 1.75 m (5 ft 9 in)

Sport
- Sport: Skiing
- Club: SK Saalfelden-Salzburg

World Cup career
- Seasons: 2010–2020
- Indiv. starts: 134
- Indiv. podiums: 0
- Team starts: 10
- Team podiums: 0
- Overall titles: 0 – (45th in 2016)
- Discipline titles: 0

Bernhard Tritscher (born 25 April 1988) is an Austrian former cross-country skier.

== Cross-country skiing results ==
All results are sourced from the International Ski Federation (FIS).

=== Olympic Games ===
Year	Age	15 km individual	30 km skiathlon	50 km mass start	Sprint	4 × 10 km relay	Team sprint
2014	25	—	—	24	7	—	—
2018	29	37	—	39	—	13	16

=== World Championships ===
Year	Age	15 km individual	30 km skiathlon	50 km mass start	Sprint	4 × 10 km relay	Team sprint
2011	22	DNS	—	48	21	—	—
2013	24	51	—	—	—	—	7
2015	26	6	—	28	—	—	12
2017	28	—	—	45	33	—	—
2019	30	—	46	30	—	—	—

=== World Cup ===
==== Season standings ====
Season	Age	Discipline standings			Ski Tour standings				
Season	Age	Overall	Distance	Sprint	Nordic Opening	Tour de Ski	Ski Tour 2020	World Cup Final	Ski Tour Canada
2010	21	NC	—	NC	—N/a	—	—N/a	—	—N/a
2011	22	67	NC	28	—	DNF	—N/a	—	—N/a
2012	23	111	NC	61	—	DNF	—N/a	—	—N/a
2013	24	63	79	36	—	DNF	—N/a	—	—N/a
2014	25	73	76	39	—	DNF	—N/a	—	—N/a
2015	26	47	50	28	64	36	—N/a	—N/a	—N/a
2016	27	45	45	31	43	DNF	—N/a	—N/a	28
2017	28	103	115	51	46	DNF	—N/a	—	—N/a
2018	29	119	89	81	—	DNF	—N/a	62	—N/a
2019	30	NC	NC	NC	DNF	—	—N/a	DNF	—N/a
2020	31	NC	NC	NC	—	DNF	DNF	—N/a	—N/a
