= Federico Pellegrino =

Italian cross-country skier (born 1990)

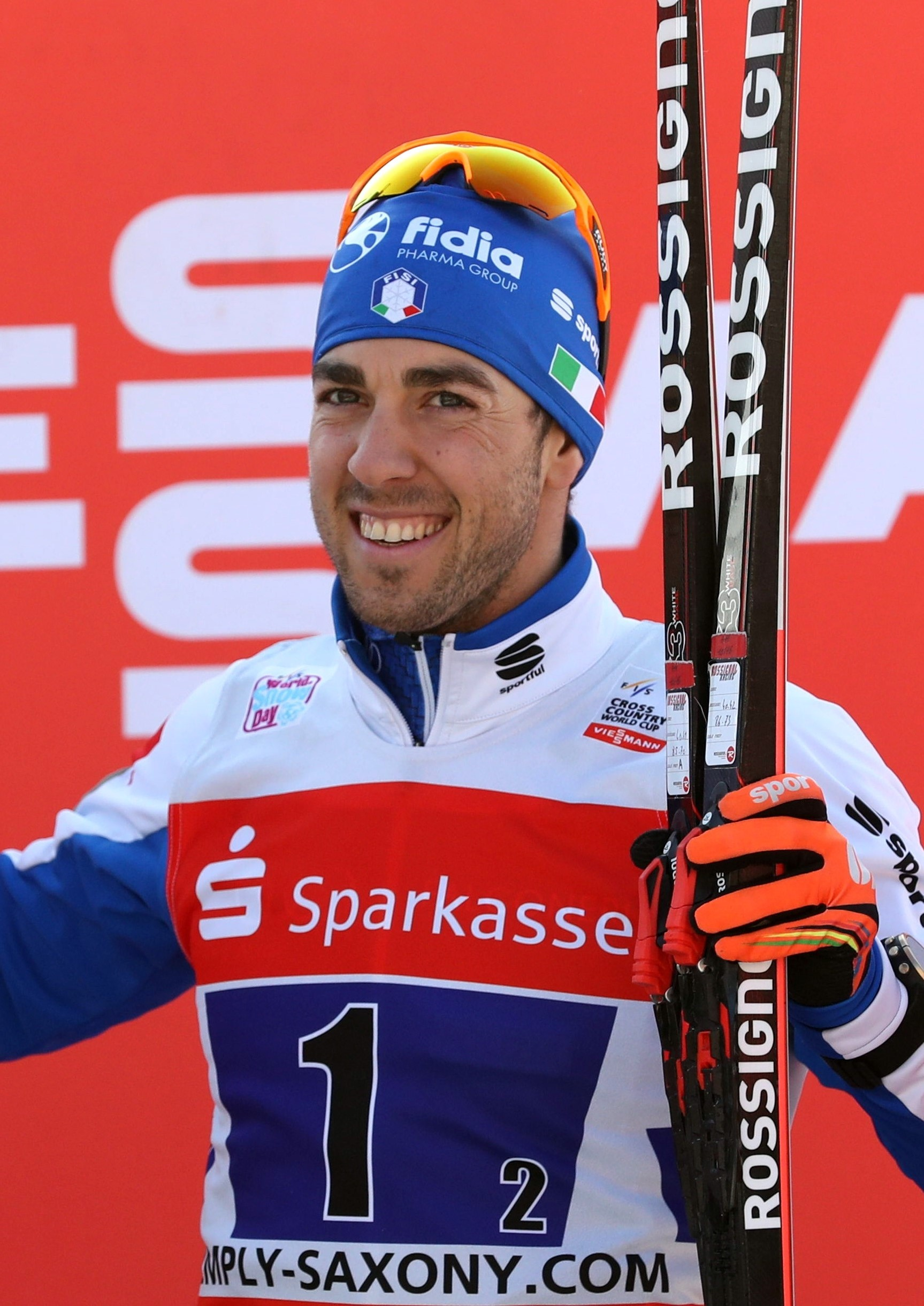
- Pellegrino in Dresden, 2018

Personal information
- Nationality: Italy
- Born: 1 September 1990 (age 36) Aosta, Italy
- Height: 1.73 m (5 ft 8 in)

Sport
- Sport: Skiing
- Club: Fiamme Oro

World Cup career
- Seasons: 17 – (2010–2026)
- Indiv. starts: 311
- Indiv. podiums: 50
- Indiv. wins: 18
- Team starts: 34
- Team podiums: 13
- Team wins: 4
- Overall titles: 0 – (3rd in 2023 and 2026)
- Discipline titles: 2 – (2 SP)
Medal record
Men's cross-country skiing
Representing Italy
Olympic Games
Silver medal – second place	2018 Pyeongchang	Individual sprint
Silver medal – second place	2022 Beijing	Individual sprint
Bronze medal – third place	2026 Milano Cortina	4 × 7.5 km relay
Bronze medal – third place	2026 Milano Cortina	Team sprint
World Championships
Gold medal – first place	2017 Lahti	Individual sprint
Silver medal – second place	2017 Lahti	Team sprint
Silver medal – second place	2019 Seefeld	Individual sprint
Silver medal – second place	2023 Planica	Team sprint
Silver medal – second place	2025 Trondheim	Individual sprint
Bronze medal – third place	2015 Falun	Team sprint
Bronze medal – third place	2019 Seefeld	Team sprint
U23 World Championships
Gold medal – first place	2013 Liberec	Individual sprint
Junior World Championships
Bronze medal – third place	2010 Hinterzarten	Individual sprint
- Updated on 22 March 2026

Federico Pellegrino (born 1 September 1990) is an Italian cross-country skier. Pellegrino is a world champion and two-time Olympic silver medallist in cross-country skiing's individual sprint, and has won two sprint World Cups.

Pellegrino is an athlete of the G.S. Fiamme Oro.

== Biography ==
Originally from Nus, Pellegrino made his World Cup debut in the 2009–10 season. He has achieved his best results in the sprint events and won the Sprint Cup in the 2015–16 season, becoming the first non-Scandinavian to win the Sprint World Cup. As of 30 November 2018 Pellegrino has won 12 individual World Cup victories, all of them sprints: he holds the record for most individual wins for an Italian in the Cross-Country World Cup. He won his first international medal in cross-country skiing at the 2015 World Championships in Falun, Sweden. Together with Dietmar Nöckler, Pellegrino won a bronze medal in team sprint, classic. In 2017 he became World Champion after winning the sprint freestyle event during the 2017 World Championships in Lahti, Finland. This was the first gold medal for the Italian men at the Nordic Worlds since Renato Pasini and Cristian Zorzi won the team sprint in 2007. He was a part of the Italian team which won the nation's second consecutive medal on the team sprint event, this time a silver medal together with teammate Dietmar Nöckler.

He is the cousin of the mountain running champion Xavier Chevrier. Pellegrino has been in a relationship with fellow cross-country skier Greta Laurent since 2012, having previously been a couple during their school-age careers. He dedicated his first World Cup race win in 2014 to Laurent. Since 2012 they have lived in Gressoney-Saint-Jean.

== Cross-country skiing results ==
All results are sourced from the International Ski Federation (FIS).

=== Olympic Games ===
- 4 medals – (2 silver, 2 bronze)

Year	Age	10/15 km individual	20/30 km skiathlon	50 km mass start	Sprint	4 × 7.5/10 km relay	Team sprint
2014	23	—	—	—	11	—	11
2018	27	—	—	—	Silver	7	5
2022	31	—	—	—^{[a]}	Silver	8	6
2026	35	—	20	—	7	Bronze	Bronze

^{a} Distance reduced to 30 km due to weather conditions.

=== World Championships ===
- 7 medals – (1 gold, 4 silver, 2 bronze)

Year	Age	10/15 km individual	20/30 km skiathlon	50 km mass start	Sprint	4 × 7.5/10 km relay	Team sprint
2011	20	—	—	—	12	—	—
2013	22	—	—	—	12	—	5
2015	24	—	—	—	5	6	Bronze
2017	26	—	—	—	Gold	8	Silver
2019	28	—	—	—	Silver	10	Bronze
2021	30	—	—	—	11	—	5
2023	32	—	—	10	17	9	Silver
2025	34	—	5	—	Silver	6	4

=== World Cup ===
==== Season titles ====
- 2 titles – (2 sprint)

Season
Season	Discipline
2016	Sprint
2021	Sprint

==== Season standings ====
Season	Age	Discipline standings			Ski Tour standings				
Season	Age	Overall	Distance	Sprint	Nordic Opening	Tour de Ski	Ski Tour 2020	World Cup Final	Ski Tour Canada
2010	19	149	—	84	—N/a	—	—N/a	—	—N/a
2011	20	43	NC	13	—	—	—N/a	42	—N/a
2012	21	49	NC	17	—	DNF	—N/a	42	—N/a
2013	22	43	71	14	—	DNF	—N/a	DNF	—N/a
2014	23	22	81	7	60	DNF	—N/a	34	—N/a
2015	24	15	NC	3rd place, bronze medalist(s)	51	DNF	—N/a	—N/a	—N/a
2016	25	16	59	1st place, gold medalist(s)	22	DNF	—N/a	—N/a	31
2017	26	22	58	2nd place, silver medalist(s)	39	DNF	—N/a	19	—N/a
2018	27	10	39	2nd place, silver medalist(s)	21	DNF	—N/a	19	—N/a
2019	28	8	41	2nd place, silver medalist(s)	DNF	DNF	—N/a	6	—N/a
2020	29	16	52	4	19	DNF	DNF	—N/a	—N/a
2021	30	4	35	1st place, gold medalist(s)	19	14	—N/a	—N/a	—N/a
2022	31	12	28	4	—N/a	27	—N/a	—N/a	—N/a
2023	32	3rd place, bronze medalist(s)	12	4	—N/a	4	—N/a	—N/a	—N/a
2024	33	8	17	12	—N/a	DNF	—N/a	—N/a	—N/a
2025	34	4	16	6	—N/a	4	—N/a	—N/a	—N/a
2026	35	3rd place, bronze medalist(s)	8	3rd place, bronze medalist(s)	—N/a	4	—N/a	—N/a	—N/a

==== Individual podiums ====
- 18 victories – (13 WC, 5 SWC)
- 50 podiums – (31 WC, 19 SWC)

No.	Season	Date	Location	Race	Level	Place
1	2010–11	15 January 2011	Liberec, Czech Republic	1.6 km Sprint F	World Cup	2nd
2	2012–13	1 January 2013	Val Müstair, Switzerland	1.4 km Sprint F	Stage World Cup	2nd
3	2012–13	16 February 2013	Davos, Switzerland	1.5 km Sprint C	World Cup	3rd
4	2013–14	29 December 2013	Oberhof, Germany	1.5 km Sprint F	Stage World Cup	2nd
5	2013–14	11 January 2014	Nové Město, Czech Republic	1.6 km Sprint F	World Cup	2nd
6	2014–15	21 December 2014	Davos, Switzerland	1.3 km Sprint F	World Cup	1st
7	2014–15	6 January 2015	Val Müstair, Switzerland	1.4 km Sprint F	Stage World Cup	1st
8	2014–15	24 January 2015	Rybinsk, Russia	1.3 km Sprint F	World Cup	1st
9	2015–16	13 December 2015	Davos, Switzerland	1.6 km Sprint F	World Cup	1st
10	2015–16	19 December 2015	Toblach, Italy	1.3 km Sprint F	World Cup	1st
11	2015–16	1 January 2016	Lenzerheide, Switzerland	1.5 km Sprint F	Stage World Cup	1st
12	2015–16	16 January 2016	Planica, Slovenia	1.2 km Sprint F	World Cup	1st
13	2015–16	8 March 2016	Canmore, Canada	1.5 km Sprint C	Stage World Cup	1st
14	2016–17	31 December 2016	Val Müstair, Switzerland	1.5 km Sprint F	Stage World Cup	2nd
15	2016–17	28 January 2017	Falun, Sweden	1.4 km Sprint F	World Cup	1st
16	2017–18	9 December 2017	Davos, Switzerland	1.5 km Sprint F	World Cup	2nd
17	2017–18	30 December 2017	Lenzerheide, Switzerland	1.5 km Sprint F	Stage World Cup	2nd
18	2017–18	13 January 2018	Dresden, Germany	1.2 km Sprint F	World Cup	1st
19	2017–18	3 March 2018	Lahti, Finland	1.6 km Sprint F	World Cup	1st
20	2017–18	16 March 2018	Falun, Sweden	1.4 km Sprint F	Stage World Cup	2nd
21	2018–19	30 November 2018	Lillehammer, Norway	1.6 km Sprint F	Stage World Cup	1st
22	2018–19	15 December 2018	Davos, Switzerland	1.5 km Sprint F	World Cup	2nd
23	2018–19	1 January 2019	Val Müstair, Switzerland	1.4 km Sprint F	Stage World Cup	2nd
24	2018–19	9 February 2019	Lahti, Finland	1.6 km Sprint F	World Cup	2nd
25	2018–19	16 February 2019	Cogne, Italy	1.6 km Sprint F	World Cup	1st
26	2018–19	22 March 2019	Quebec City, Canada	1.6 km Sprint F	Stage World Cup	2nd
27	2019–20	21 December 2019	Planica, Slovenia	1.2 km Sprint F	World Cup	2nd
28	2019–20	29 December 2019	Lenzerheide, Switzerland	1.5 km Sprint F	Stage World Cup	2nd
29	2019–20	18 February 2020	Åre, Sweden	0.7 km Sprint F	Stage World Cup	2nd
30	2020–21	12 December 2020	Davos, Switzerland	1.5 km Sprint F	World Cup	1st
31	2020–21	19 December 2020	Dresden, Germany	1.3 km Sprint F	World Cup	1st
32	2020–21	1 January 2021	Val Müstair, Switzerland	1.4 km Sprint F	Stage World Cup	1st
33	2020–21	6 February 2021	Ulricehamn, Sweden	1.5 km Sprint F	World Cup	3rd
34	2021–22	18 December 2021	Dresden, Germany	1.3 km Sprint F	World Cup	2nd
35	2022–23	27 November 2022	Rukatunturi, Finland	20 km Pursuit F	World Cup	3rd
36	2022–23	3 December 2022	Lillehammer, Norway	1.6 km Sprint F	World Cup	2nd
37	2022–23	17 December 2022	Davos, Switzerland	1.5 km Sprint F	World Cup	1st
38	2022–23	31 December 2022	Val Müstair, Switzerland	1.5 km Sprint F	Stage World Cup	2nd
39	2022–23	1 January 2023	Val Müstair, Switzerland	10 km Pursuit C	Stage World Cup	3rd
40	2022–23	4 January 2023	Oberstdorf, Germany	20 km Pursuit F	Stage World Cup	3rd
41	2022–23	3 February 2023	Toblach, Italy	1.4 km Sprint F	World Cup	3rd
42	2022–23	18 March 2023	Falun, Sweden	1.4 km Sprint F	World Cup	3rd
43	2023–24	3 January 2024	Davos, Switzerland	1.2 km Sprint F	Stage World Cup	3rd
44	2023–24	17 February 2024	(United States) Minneapolis, USA	1.5 km Sprint F	World Cup	2nd
45	2024–25	7 December 2024	Lillehammer, Norway	1.3 km Sprint F	World Cup	3rd
46	2024–25	4 January 2025	Val di Fiemme, Italy	10 km + 10 km Skiathlon C/F	Stage World Cup	2nd
47	2024–25	21 March 2025	Lahti, Finland	1.5 km Sprint F	World Cup	3rd
48	2025–26	13 December 2025	Davos, Switzerland	1.5 km Sprint F	World Cup	2rd
49	2025–26	17 January 2026	Oberhof, Germany	1.3 km Sprint F	World Cup	2rd
50	2025–26	21 March 2026	Lake Placid, United States	1.4 km Sprint F	World Cup	1st

==== Team podiums ====
- 4 victories – (1 RL, 3 TS)
- 13 podiums – (3 RL, 10 TS)

No.	Season	Date	Location	Race	Level	Place	Teammate(s)
1	2014–15	18 January 2015	Otepää, Estonia	6 × 1.5 km Team Sprint F	World Cup	3rd	Nöckler
2	2015–16	16 January 2016	Planica, Slovenia	6 × 1.2 km Team Sprint F	World Cup	1st	Nöckler
3	2015–16	24 January 2016	Nové Město, Czech Republic	4 × 7.5 km Relay C/F	World Cup	3rd	Nöckler / De Fabiani / Clara
4	2016–17	15 January 2017	Toblach, Italy	6 × 1.3 km Team Sprint F	World Cup	3rd	Nöckler
5	2017–18	14 January 2018	Dresden, Germany	6 × 1.3 km Team Sprint F	World Cup	1st	Nöckler
6	2020–21	20 December 2020	(Germany) Dresden, Italy	12 × 0.65 km Team Sprint F	World Cup	3rd	De Fabiani
7	2020–21	7 February 2021	Ulricehamn, Sweden	6 × 1.5 km Team Sprint F	World Cup	1st	De Fabiani
8	2022–23	22 January 2023	Livigno, Italy	6 × 1.2 km Team Sprint F	World Cup	2nd	De Fabiani
9	2022–23	5 February 2023	Toblach, Italy	4 × 7.5 km Relay C/F	World Cup	1st	Nöckler / De Fabiani / Daprà
10	2022–23	24 March 2023	Lahti, Finland	6 × 1.4 km Team Sprint F	World Cup	2nd	De Fabiani
11	2023–24	21 January 2024	Oberhof, Germany	4 × 7.5 km Relay C/F	World Cup	2nd	Nöckler / Barp / Daprà
12	2025–26	12 December 2025	Davos, Switzerland	6 × 1.2 km Team Sprint F	World Cup	2nd	Barp
13	2025–26	23 January 2026	Goms, Switzerland	6 × 1.5 km Team Sprint F	World Cup	2nd	Barp
