= Martti Jylhä =

Finnish cross-country skier

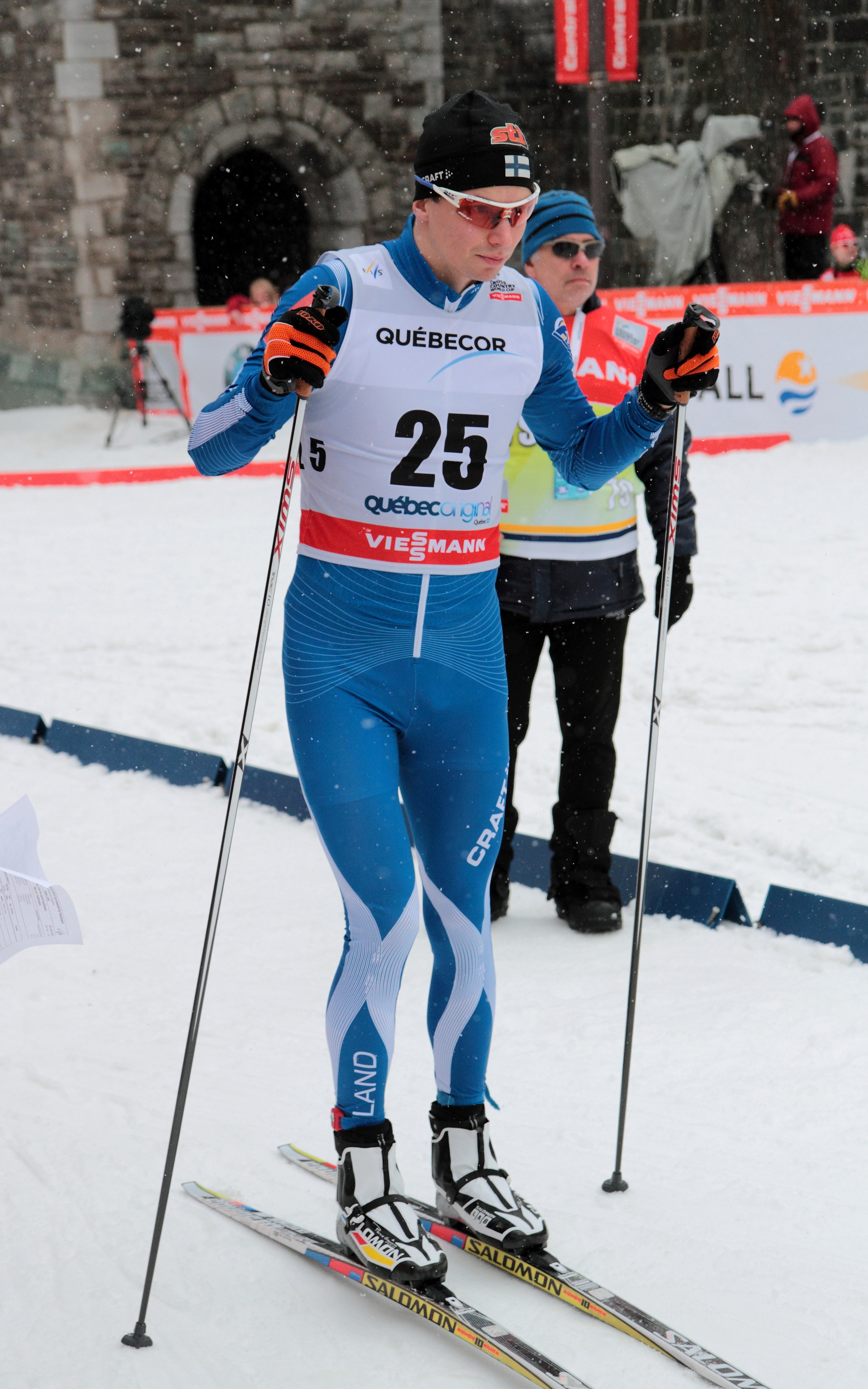
- Jylhä in 2012

Personal information
- Full name: Martti Samuel Jylhä
- Nationality: Finland
- Born: June 3, 1987 (age 39) Sotkamo, Finland
- Height: 1.84 m (6 ft 0 in)

Sport
- Sport: Skiing
- Club: Vuokatti Ski Team Kainuu

World Cup career
- Seasons: 13 – (2006, 2008–2019)
- Indiv. starts: 116
- Indiv. podiums: 1
- Indiv. wins: 0
- Team starts: 12
- Team podiums: 0
- Overall titles: 0 – (33rd in 2016)
- Discipline titles: 0
Medal record
Men's cross-country skiing
Representing Finland
Junior World Championships
Gold medal – first place	2007 Tarvisio	10 km freestyle
Silver medal – second place	2007 Tarvisio	Individual sprint
- Updated on 5 January 2022

Martti Samuel Jylhä (born 3 June 1987) is a Finnish cross-country skier.

== Cross-country skiing results ==
All results are sourced from the International Ski Federation (FIS).

=== Olympic Games ===
Year	Age	15 km individual	30 km skiathlon	50 km mass start	Sprint	4 × 10 km relay	Team sprint
2014	26	—	—	DNF	21	—	—
2018	30	—	—	—	10	—	9

=== World Championships ===
Year	Age	15 km individual	30 km skiathlon	50 km mass start	Sprint	4 × 10 km relay	Team sprint
2009	21	—	—	—	33	—	—
2011	23	—	—	—	22	—	—
2015	27	—	—	—	—	—	5
2017	29	—	—	—	7	—	—

=== World Cup ===
==== Season standings ====
Season	Age	Discipline standings			Ski Tour standings			
Season	Age	Overall	Distance	Sprint	Nordic Opening	Tour de Ski	World Cup Final	Ski Tour Canada
2006	18	168	—	73	—N/a	—N/a	—N/a	—N/a
2008	20	78	NC	47	—N/a	—	—	—N/a
2009	21	69	NC	32	—N/a	—	71	—N/a
2010	22	97	113	50	—N/a	—	—	—N/a
2011	23	62	—	22	DNF	—	—	—N/a
2012	24	80	NC	37	DNF	—	—	—N/a
2013	25	87	—	43	—	—	—	—N/a
2014	26	41	NC	12	DNF	—	38	—N/a
2015	27	65	NC	25	62	—	—N/a	—N/a
2016	28	33	NC	11	DNF	DNF	—N/a	DNF
2017	29	76	NC	32	—	DNF	—	—N/a
2018	30	64	NC	28	DNF	DNF	DNF	—N/a
2019	31	134	NC	86	DNF	—	—	—N/a

==== Individual podiums ====
- 1 podium – (1 WC)

No.	Season	Date	Location	Race	Level	Place
1	2013–14	15 December 2013	Davos, Switzerland	1.5 km Sprint F	Stage World Cup	2nd
