= Lari Lehtonen =

Finnish cross-country skier

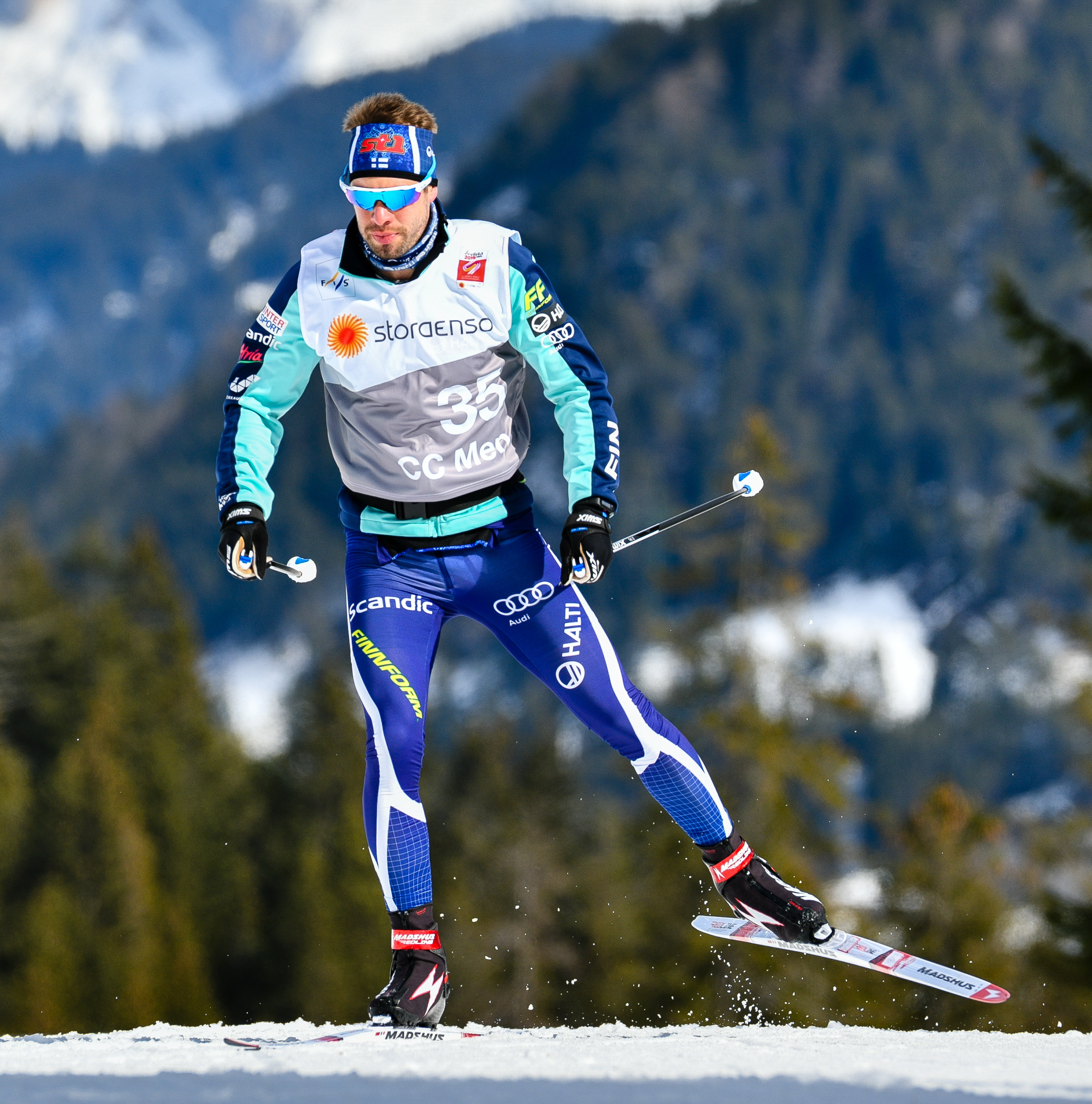
- Lehtonen in 2019

Personal information
- Nationality: Finland
- Born: 21 June 1987 (age 39) Imatra, Finland

Sport
- Sport: Skiing
- Club: Imatran Urheilijat

World Cup career
- Seasons: 13 – (2008–2020)
- Indiv. starts: 131
- Indiv. podiums: 0
- Team starts: 10
- Team podiums: 0
- Overall titles: 0 – (48th in 2014)
- Discipline titles: 0

Lari Lehtonen (born 21 June 1987 in Imatra) is a Finnish former cross-country skier who began competing at senior level in 2005. At the 2010 Winter Olympics in Vancouver, he finished 33rd in the 30 km mixed pursuit and 43rd in the 50 km event.

Lehtonen's best World Cup finish was 18th in a 15 km event at Estonia in 2010. He retired after the 2019–20 season.

== Cross-country skiing results ==
All results are sourced from the International Ski Federation (FIS).

=== Olympic Games ===
| Year | Age | 15 km individual | 30 km skiathlon | 50 km mass start | Sprint | 4 × 10 km relay | Team sprint |
|---|---|---|---|---|---|---|---|
| 2010 | 22 | 33 | — | 43 | — | — | — |
| 2014 | 26 | — | 37 | 23 | — | 6 | — |
| 2018 | 30 | 31 | 33 | — | — | 4 | — |

=== World Championships ===
| Year | Age | 15 km individual | 30 km skiathlon | 50 km mass start | Sprint | 4 × 10 km relay | Team sprint |
|---|---|---|---|---|---|---|---|
| 2011 | 23 | — | 43 | — | — | — | — |
| 2013 | 25 | 20 | 26 | 22 | — | 5 | — |
| 2015 | 27 | 23 | 22 | DNF | — | — | — |
| 2017 | 29 | 24 | 9 | 23 | — | 5 | — |
| 2019 | 31 | — | — | 35 | — | — | — |

=== World Cup ===
==== Season standings ====
| Season | Age | Discipline standings | | | Ski Tour standings | | | |
| Season | Age | Overall | Distance | Sprint | Nordic Opening | Tour de Ski | World Cup Final | Ski Tour Canada |
|---|---|---|---|---|---|---|---|---|
| 2008 | 20 | NC | NC | — | —N/a | — | — | —N/a |
| 2009 | 21 | NC | NC | — | —N/a | — | — | —N/a |
| 2010 | 22 | 143 | 91 | — | —N/a | — | — | —N/a |
| 2011 | 23 | 132 | 84 | NC | DNF | — | — | —N/a |
| 2012 | 24 | 76 | 57 | NC | 21 | 44 | — | —N/a |
| 2013 | 25 | 98 | 61 | NC | — | 42 | — | —N/a |
| 2014 | 26 | 48 | 33 | 92 | 38 | 14 | DNF | —N/a |
| 2015 | 27 | 95 | 59 | NC | 26 | — | —N/a | —N/a |
| 2016 | 28 | 58 | 40 | NC | — | — | —N/a | 24 |
| 2017 | 29 | 59 | 42 | NC | 15 | — | 35 | —N/a |
| 2018 | 30 | 94 | 62 | NC | 47 | — | 37 | —N/a |
| 2019 | 31 | 142 | 99 | NC | DNF | — | — | —N/a |
| 2020 | 32 | 82 | 73 | NC | 23 | 38 | —N/a | —N/a |
