= Jonas Dobler =

German cross-country skier (born 1991)

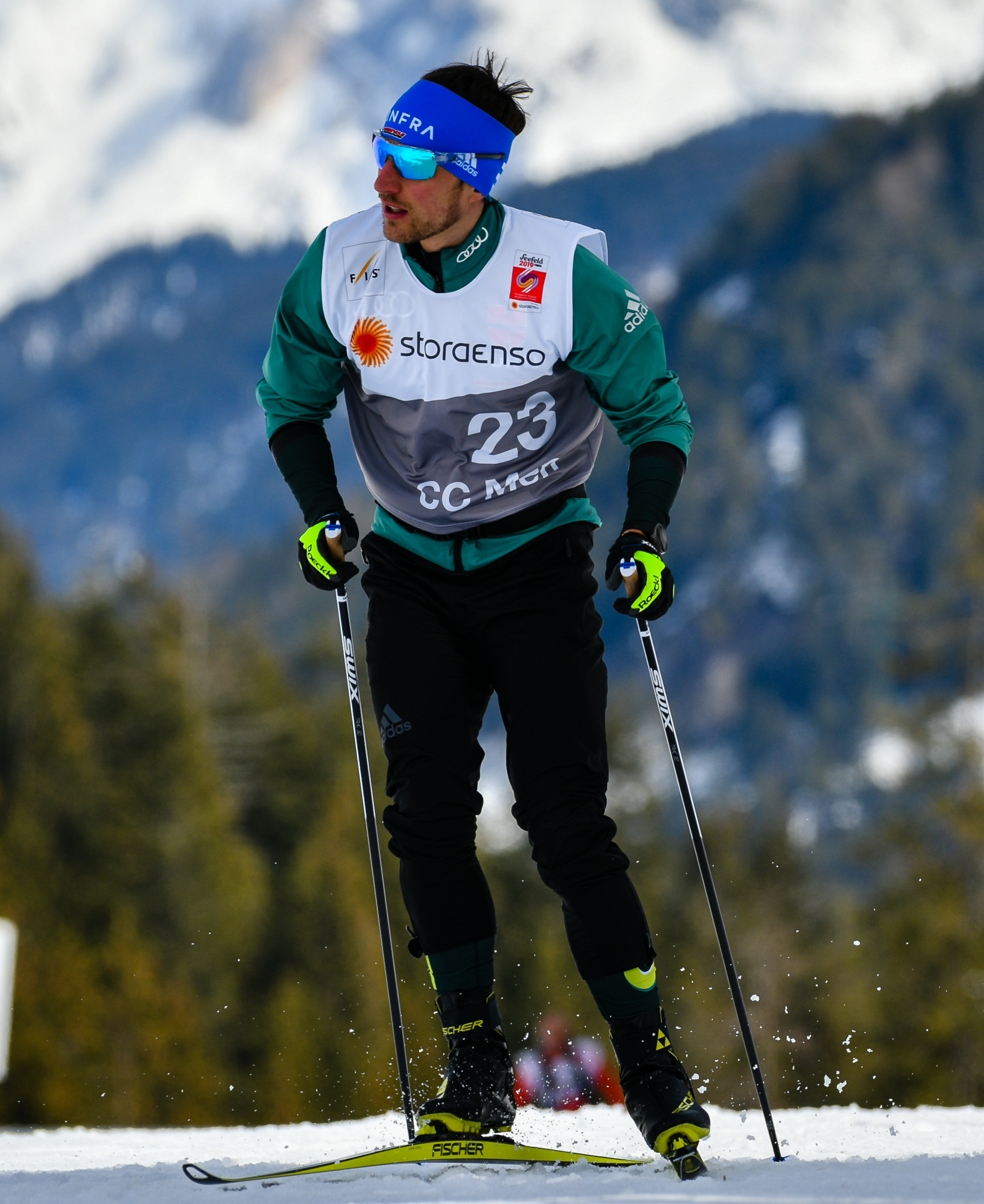
- Dobler in March 2019

Personal information
- Nationality: Germany
- Born: 4 May 1991 (age 35) Traunstein, Germany
- Height: 1.79 m (5 ft 10 in)

Sport
- Sport: Skiing
- Club: SC Traunstein

World Cup career
- Seasons: 12 – (2012–2023)
- Indiv. starts: 162
- Indiv. podiums: 0
- Team starts: 10
- Team podiums: 0
- Overall titles: 0 – (41st in 2021)
- Discipline titles: 0
Medal record
Men's cross-country skiing
Representing Germany
World Championships
Bronze medal – third place	2023 Planica	4 × 10 km relay

Jonas Dobler (born 4 May 1991) is a German, former cross-country skier.

He represented Germany at the FIS Nordic World Ski Championships 2015 in Falun.

He announced his retirement from cross-country skiing on March 8, 2023.

== Cross-country skiing results ==
All results are sourced from the International Ski Federation (FIS).

=== Olympic Games ===
Year	Age	15 km individual	30 km skiathlon	50 km mass start	Sprint	4 × 10 km relay	Team sprint
2018	26	—	22	DNF	—	6	—
2022	30	19	DNS	20^{[a]}	—	—	—

^{a} Distance reduced to 30 km due to weather conditions.

=== World Championships ===
- 1 medal – (1 bronze)

Year	Age	15 km individual	30 km skiathlon	50 km mass start	Sprint	4 × 10 km relay	Team sprint
2015	23	31	27	—	—	7	—
2017	25	27	21	24	—	6	—
2019	27	—	25	—	—	6	—
2021	29	23	36	17	—	7	—
2023	31	18	15	21	—	Bronze	—

=== World Cup ===
==== Season standings ====
Season	Age	Discipline standings			Ski Tour standings				
Season	Age	Overall	Distance	Sprint	Nordic Opening	Tour de Ski	Ski Tour 2020	World Cup Final	Ski Tour Canada
2012	21	NC	NC	NC	—	DNF	—N/a	—	—N/a
2013	22	NC	NC	—	—	DNF	—N/a	—	—N/a
2014	23	62	62	68	48	21	—N/a	—	—N/a
2015	24	51	46	NC	38	16	—N/a	—N/a	—N/a
2016	25	27	23	NC	24	17	—N/a	—N/a	25
2017	26	112	72	NC	—	DNF	—N/a	33	—N/a
2018	27	60	46	NC	38	23	—N/a	40	—N/a
2019	28	57	38	NC	31	26	—N/a	35	—N/a
2020	29	54	34	NC	33	DNF	—	—N/a	—N/a
2021	30	41	29	NC	33	21	—N/a	—N/a	—N/a
2022	31	65	36	NC	—N/a	DNF	—N/a	—N/a	—N/a
2023	32	57	38	NC	—N/a	36	—N/a	—N/a	—N/a
