= Florian Notz =

German cross-country skier (born 1992)

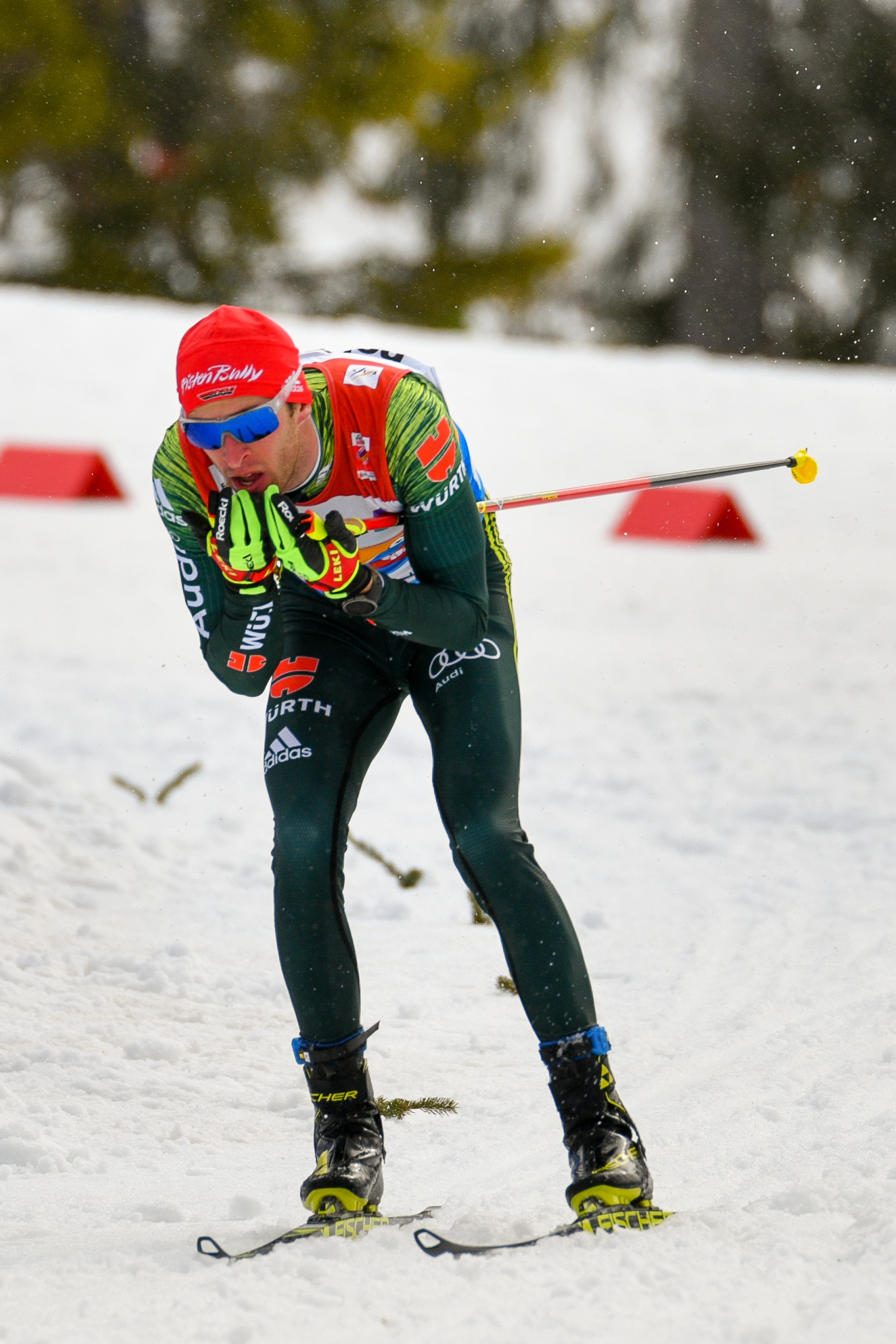
- Notz in 2019

Personal information
- Nationality: German
- Born: 24 April 1992 (age 34) Dettingen an der Erms, Germany
- Height: 1.87 m (6 ft 2 in)

Sport
- Sport: Skiing
- Club: Skizunft Römerstein

World Cup career
- Seasons: 10 – (2014–present)
- Indiv. starts: 148
- Indiv. podiums: 0
- Team starts: 10
- Team podiums: 0
- Overall titles: 0 – (29th in 2021)
- Discipline titles: 0
Medal record
Representing Germany
Men's cross-country skiing
U23 World Championships
Gold medal – first place	2015 Almaty	15 km freestyle
- Updated on 1 March 2025

Florian Notz (born 24 April 1992) is a German cross-country skier. He competed in the World Cup 2015 season.

He represented Germany at the FIS Nordic World Ski Championships 2015 in Falun.

== Cross-country skiing results ==
All results are sourced from the International Ski Federation (FIS).

=== Olympic Games ===
Year	Age	15 km individual	30 km skiathlon	50 km mass start	Sprint	4 × 10 km relay	Team sprint
2022	29	—	19	26^{[a]}	—	5	—

^{a} Distance reduced to 30 km due to weather conditions.

=== World Championships ===
Year	Age	15 km individual	30 km skiathlon	50 km mass start	Sprint	4 × 10 km relay	Team sprint
2015	22	35	47	DNF	—	7	—
2017	24	—	16	47	—	6	—
2019	26	—	18	—	—	6	—
2021	28	26	48	—	—	—	—
2025	32	—	27	43	—	8	—

=== World Cup ===
==== Season standings ====
Season	Age	Discipline standings			Ski Tour standings				
Season	Age	Overall	Distance	Sprint	Nordic Opening	Tour de Ski	Ski Tour 2020	World Cup Final	Ski Tour Canada
2014	21	103	62	NC	—	—	—N/a	—	—N/a
2015	22	136	82	NC	DNF	39	—N/a	—N/a	—N/a
2016	23	105	63	NC	31	DNF	—N/a	—N/a	—
2017	24	35	31	NC	38	17	—N/a	47	—N/a
2018	25	68	43	NC	—	30	—N/a	39	—N/a
2019	26	33	28	NC	47	13	—N/a	24	—N/a
2020	27	65	43	NC	—	DNF	—	—N/a	—N/a
2021	28	29	23	NC	34	19	—N/a	—N/a	—N/a
2022	29	108	61	NC	—N/a	DNF	—N/a	—N/a	—N/a
2023	30	100	56	NC	—N/a	DNF	—N/a	—N/a	—N/a
