= Noah Hoffman =

American cross-country skier

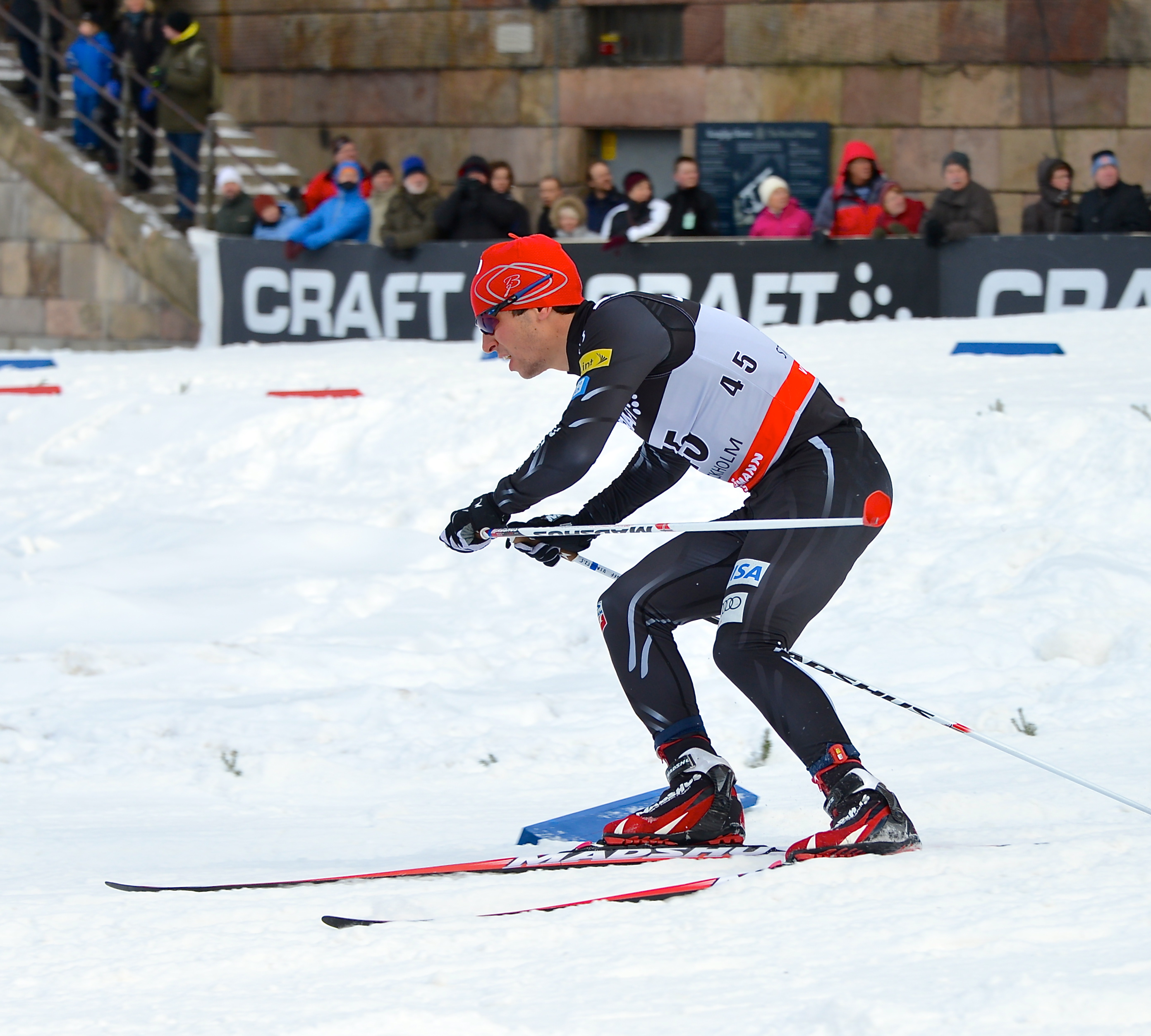

Personal information
- Nationality: United States
- Born: August 1, 1989 (age 36) Evergreen, Colorado, U.S.
- Height: 5 ft 9 in (175 cm)

Sport
- Sport: Skiing
- Club: Ski and Snowboard Club Vail

World Cup career
- Seasons: 10 – (2009–2018)
- Indiv. starts: 127
- Indiv. podiums: 1
- Indiv. wins: 1
- Team starts: 8
- Team podiums: 0
- Overall titles: 0 – (35th in 2014)
- Discipline titles: 0
Medal record
Men's cross-country skiing
Representing United States
U23 World Championships
Silver medal – second place	2012 Erzurum	15 km classical

Noah Hoffman (born August 1, 1989) is a retired American Olympic cross-country skier. He competed for the United States at the 2014 Winter Olympics in Sochi, Russia, and in the 2018 Winter Olympics in Pyeongchang, South Korea.

== Personal ==
Hoffman was born in Evergreen, Colorado to Mike and Sharon Hoffman. He has a sister named Maggie. He grew up in Aspen, Colorado. In middle school, he ran cross-country.

Hoffman graduated from Aspen High School in 2007. He postponed college to focus on skiing.

After retiring from professional skiing in 2018, Hoffman earned a bachelor's degree in economics from Brown University. In 2022 Hoffman matriculated at Yale Law School.

== Career ==
Hoffman began skiing at age four. His club is the Ski and Snowboard Club Vail. Hoffman's coaches are John Callahan, Zach Caldwell, Jason Cork, Matt Whitcomb, Chris Grover, Eric Pepper, and Dan Weiland.

=== Early years ===
Hoffman came in 12th in the 10k in the 2008 Junior World Championships.

Hoffman debuted in the FIS World Cup at Vancouver in January 2009, placing 25th in the 30 km skiathlon. His first European appearance in the World Cup was at the 2010–11 season opener in Gällivare, where he placed 31st in the 15 km freestyle, only just missing out on a points finish.

He represented the United States at the 2011 World Championships in Oslo, Norway, where Hoffman placed 14th in the Men's 4x10k Relay, 29th in the 15 km classic, and 30th in the 50 km freestyle mass start.

=== 2012–13 ===
Hoffman opened the 2012–13 season well, placing a career-best 19th in the second stage of the Nordic Opening at Ruka, a 10 km freestyle race; he went on to place 26th in the final standings of the Ruka Triple. He scored his first top 10 finish two weeks later at Canmore, placing 8th in the 30 km skiathlon. Hoffman also completed his first Tour de Ski, finishing 46th with a best stage finish of 17th in the final climb. He came in 8th in the 4x10k Relay in the 2012 World Cup in Nove Mesto, Czech Republic. He came in second in the 15k CL at the U23 2012 World Championships, the highest finish ever by an American at the U23 World Championships.

Hoffman won the 2012 U.S. Championship Title in the 30k CL, in Rumford, Maine.

At the 2013 World Championships in Val di Fiemme, Italy, Hoffman improved on his results from two years before. He finished strong to place 15th in the 15 km freestyle, his best World Championship result to date. In the 50 km classic mass start he placed 27th after going with an early five-man breakaway. He was the top American in both races. He placed 10th in the 4x10k Relay.

Hoffman narrowly qualified for his first World Cup Final in Falun, Sweden, scoring seven World Cup points at the last opportunity (a 50 km freestyle mass start at Oslo) to move to 47th in the World Cup overall standings as the top 50 qualified for the final weekend. He eventually finished 48th in the overall World Cup and 36th in the distance World Cup.

=== 2013–14 ===
Hoffman underwent shoulder surgery in the off-season, hoping to eliminate a recurring shoulder dislocation problem. He placed a career-best 9th in the season-opening Ruka Triple, being the fastest skier in the final stage (a 15 km freestyle pursuit) and thus receiving the maximum 50 World Cup points for a stage win. Hoffman also had the fastest time on the day during the 35 km pursuit during the Tour de Ski.

Hoffman represented the United States at the 2014 Winter Olympics in Sochi, Russia, and came in 11th in the Men's 4x10k Relay, 26th in the Men's 50k Freestyle Mass Start, 31st in the Men's 15K classic, and 35th in the Men's Skiathlon 30K in which he crashed as he rounded a 180-degree corner turn and broke his ski pole.

In November 2014 Hoffman crashed and broke his left fibula above the ankle and suffered medial collateral ligament damage when his skis got caught in the course fencing at the Kuusamo World Cup in Finland. He had surgery to implant pins and a plate near his ankle to repair his leg.

In the 2015 World Ski Championships in Falun, Sweden, he placed 11th in the 4x10k Relay.

=== 2015-16 ===
In 2015-16 Hoffman was the top distance racer in the United States, as he won several World Cup points throughout the season. His best result was 19th in a 10k freestyle race in Toblach, Italy. He also had his career-best Tour de Ski, in which he finished 22nd overall in the Tour standings.

=== 2017-18 ===
At the 2017 World Championships, he came in 50th in the 50K mass start, and 57th in the skiathlon 15/15K.

He competed for the United States at the 2018 Winter Olympics in Pyeongchang, South Korea. He came in 48th in the 15K freestyle, and 54th in the skiathlon 15/15K.

Hoffman retired from cross-country skiing at the Holmenkollen Ski Festival two weeks after the conclusion of the 2018 Winter Olympics.

== Cross-country skiing results ==
All results are sourced from the International Ski Federation (FIS).

=== Olympic Games ===
Year	Age	15 km individual	30 km skiathlon	50 km mass start	Sprint	4 × 10 km relay	Team sprint
2014	25	31	34	26	—	11	—
2018	29	48	54	33	—	14	—

=== World Championships ===
Year	Age	15 km individual	30 km skiathlon	50 km mass start	Sprint	4 × 10 km relay	Team sprint
2011	22	29	37	30	—	14	—
2013	24	15	42	27	—	10	—
2015	26	34	44	31	—	11	—
2017	28	—	57	50	—	—	—

=== World Cup ===
==== Season standings ====
Season	Age	Discipline standings			Ski Tour standings			
Season	Age	Overall	Distance	Sprint	Nordic Opening	Tour de Ski	World Cup Final	Ski Tour Canada
2009	20	162	101	—	—N/a	—	—	—N/a
2010	21	NC	NC	—	—N/a	—	—	—N/a
2011	22	NC	NC	NC	42	—	—	—N/a
2012	23	128	78	NC	58	—	—	—N/a
2013	24	48	35	NC	26	46	27	—N/a
2014	25	35	27	NC	9	24	21	—N/a
2015	26	NC	NC	—	—	—	—N/a	—N/a
2016	27	54	38	NC	52	22	—N/a	34
2017	28	51	33	NC	36	26	52	—N/a
2018	29	147	96	NC	39	—	—	—N/a

==== Individual podiums ====
- 1 victory – (1 SWC)
- 1 podium – (1 SWC)

No.	Season	Date	Location	Race	Level	Place
1	2013–14	1 December 2013	Rukatunturi, Finland	15 km Pursuit F	Stage World Cup	1st
