= Roman Schaad =

Swiss cross-country skier (born 1993)

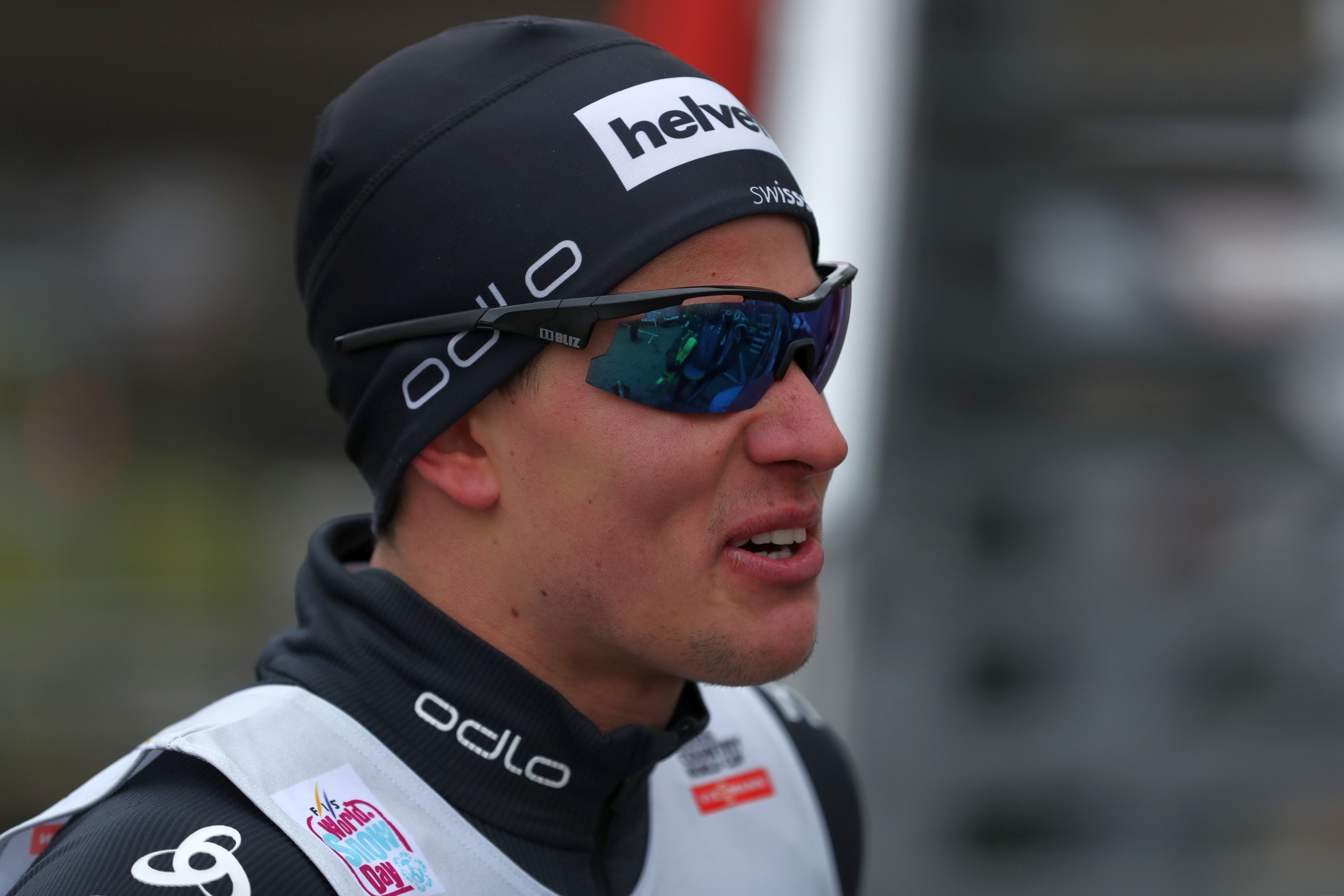
- Roman Schaad in January 2018

Personal information
- Nationality: Switzerland
- Born: 30 July 1993 (age 32) Oberhallau, Switzerland

Sport
- Sport: Skiing
- Club: SC Drusberg

World Cup career
- Seasons: 10 – (2014–present)
- Indiv. starts: 60
- Indiv. podiums: 0
- Team starts: 10
- Team podiums: 0
- Overall titles: 0 – (54th in 2021)
- Discipline titles: 0
Medal record
Men's cross-country skiing
Representing Switzerland
Junior World Championships
Bronze medal – third place	2014 Val di Fiemme	Individual sprint
- Updated on 29 March 2023

Roman Schaad (born 30 July 1993 in Oberhallau) is a Swiss cross-country skier.

Schaad competed at the 2014 Winter Olympics for Switzerland. He placed 83rd in the qualifying round in the sprint, failing to advance to the knockout stages.

Schaad made his World Cup debut in December 2013. As of April 2014, his best finish is a 9th, in a freestyle sprint event at Toblach in 2013–14. His best World Cup overall finish is 79th, in 2013–14. His best World Cup finish in a discipline is 34th, in the 2013–14 sprint.

== Cross-country skiing results ==
All results are sourced from the International Ski Federation (FIS).

=== Olympic Games ===
Year	Age	15 km individual	30 km skiathlon	50 km mass start	Sprint	4 × 10 km relay	Team sprint
2014	20	—	—	—	83	—	—
2022	28	—	—	—^{[a]}	31	—	—

^{a} Distance reduced to 30 km due to weather conditions.

=== World Championships ===
Year	Age	15 km individual	30 km skiathlon	50 km mass start	Sprint	4 × 10 km relay	Team sprint
2015	21	—	—	—	—	—	15
2019	25	—	—	—	24	—	—
2021	27	—	—	—	53	—	—
2023	29	—	—	—	39	—	13

=== World Cup ===
==== Season standings ====
Season	Age	Discipline standings				Ski Tour standings				
Season	Age	Overall	Distance	Sprint	U23	Nordic Opening	Tour de Ski	Ski Tour 2020	World Cup Final	Ski Tour Canada
2014	20	79	—	34	—N/a	—	—	—N/a	—	—N/a
2015	21	126	NC	71	16	—	—	—N/a	—N/a	—N/a
2016	22	77	—	37	7	—	DNF	—N/a	—N/a	—
2017	23	162	—	91	—N/a	—	DNF	—N/a	—	—N/a
2018	24	65	NC	29	—N/a	—	DNF	—N/a	76	—N/a
2019	25	88	NC	46	—N/a	DNF	DNF	—N/a	DNF	—N/a
2020	26	150	—	92	—N/a	—	—	—	—N/a	—N/a
2021	27	54	—	19	—N/a	—	DNF	—N/a	—N/a	—N/a
2022	28	76	—	40	—N/a	—N/a	DNF	—N/a	—N/a	—N/a
2023	29	83	NC	36	—N/a	—N/a	DNF	—N/a	—N/a	—N/a
