= Robin Duvillard =

French cross-country skier (born 1983)

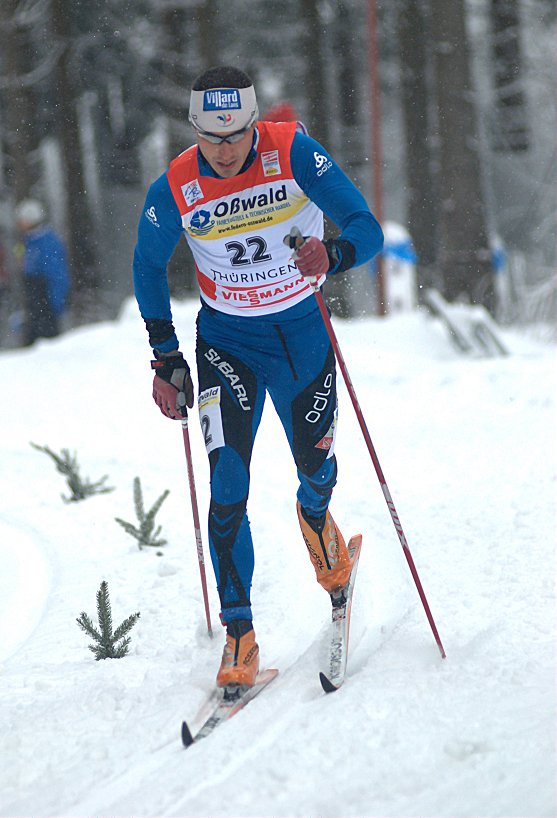
- Duvillard at the Tour de Ski in 2010

Personal information
- Nationality: France
- Born: 22 December 1983 (age 42) Saint-Martin-d'Hères, France
- Height: 178 cm (5 ft 10 in)

Sport
- Sport: Skiing
- Club: Club Ski Nordique Villard De Lans

World Cup career
- Seasons: 15 – (2004, 2006–2019)
- Indiv. starts: 132
- Indiv. podiums: 1
- Indiv. wins: 0
- Team starts: 13
- Team podiums: 0
- Overall titles: 0 – (31st in 2016)
- Discipline titles: 0
Medal record
Men's cross-country skiing
Representing France
Olympic Games
Bronze medal – third place	2014 Sochi	4 × 10 km relay
World Championships
Bronze medal – third place	2015 Falun	4 × 10 km relay
- Updated on 2 April 2019

Robin Duvillard (born 22 December 1983) is a French former cross-country skier and non-commissioned officer who began competing in 2002.

== Career ==
At the 2010 Winter Olympics in Vancouver, he finished 50th in the 30 km mixed pursuit event. At the 2014 Winter Olympics in Sochi, he finished sixth in the 50 km freestyle mass start.

Duvillard's best World Cup finish is second in the 9 km freestyle pursuit climb in Val Di Fiemme that concluded the 2016 Tour de Ski.

== Cross-country skiing results ==
All results are sourced from the International Ski Federation (FIS).

=== Olympic Games ===
- 1 medal – (1 bronze)

Year	Age	15 km individual	30 km skiathlon	50 km mass start	Sprint	4 × 10 km relay	Team sprint
2010	27	—	50	—	—	—	—
2014	31	—	—	6	—	Bronze	—

=== World Championships ===
- 1 medal – (1 bronze)

Year	Age	15 km individual	30 km skiathlon	50 km mass start	Sprint	4 × 10 km relay	Team sprint
2011	28	—	—	33	—	11	—
2013	30	44	—	—	—	9	—
2015	32	11	—	—	—	Bronze	10
2017	34	—	—	25	—	7	—
2019	36	—	—	27	—	—	—

=== World Cup ===
==== Season standings ====
Season	Age	Discipline standings			Ski Tour standings			
Season	Age	Overall	Distance	Sprint	Nordic Opening	Tour de Ski	World Cup Final	Ski Tour Canada
2004	21	NC	NC	—	—N/a	—N/a	—N/a	—N/a
2006	23	NC	NC	—	—N/a	—N/a	—N/a	—N/a
2007	24	NC	NC	—	—N/a	—	—N/a	—N/a
2008	25	136	77	NC	—N/a	—	—	—N/a
2009	26	NC	NC	—	—N/a	—	—	—N/a
2010	27	82	48	NC	—N/a	35	—	—N/a
2011	28	51	38	NC	60	20	28	—N/a
2012	29	61	45	NC	80	23	—	—N/a
2013	30	57	43	NC	DNF	48	—	—N/a
2014	31	43	22	99	—	20	31	—N/a
2015	32	37	22	NC	55	DNF	—N/a	—N/a
2016	33	31	24	NC	DNF	31	—N/a	20
2017	34	156	109	NC	DNF	—	—	—N/a
2018	35	85	55	NC	—	—	67	—N/a
2019	36	108	72	—	—	—	—	—N/a

==== Individual podiums ====
- 1 podium – (1 SWC)

No.	Season	Date	Location	Race	Level	Place
1	2015–16	10 January 2016	Val di Fiemme, Italy	9 km Pursuit F	Stage World Cup	2nd
