= FIS Nordic World Ski Championships 2025 – Men's 4 × 7.5 kilometre relay =

Men's 4 × 7.5 kilometre relay at the FIS Nordic World Ski Championships 2025
- Venue: Granåsen Ski Centre
- Location: Trondheim, Norway
- Dates: 6 March
- Competitors: 108 from 27 nations
- Teams: 27
- Winning time: 1:08:13.7

Medalists
gold medal	Erik Valnes; Martin Løwstrøm Nyenget; Harald Østberg Amundsen; Johannes Høsflot Klæbo	Norway
silver medal	Cyril Fähndrich; Jonas Baumann; Jason Rüesch; Valerio Grond	Switzerland
bronze medal	Truls Gisselman; William Poromaa; Jens Burman; Edvin Anger	Sweden

The Men's 4 × 7.5 kilometre relay competition at the FIS Nordic World Ski Championships 2025 was held on 6 March 2025.

== Results ==
The race was started at 14:30.

Rank	Bib	Country	Time	Deficit
1st place, gold medalist(s)	1	Norway; Erik Valnes; Martin Løwstrøm Nyenget; Harald Østberg Amundsen; Johannes Høsflot Klæbo	1:08:13.7; 17:05.4; 17:02.6; 16:43.0; 17:22.7	
2nd place, silver medalist(s)	8	Switzerland; Cyril Fähndrich; Jonas Baumann; Jason Rüesch; Valerio Grond	1:08:35.3; 17:28.1; 17:11.6; 16:48.0; 17:07.6	+21.6
3rd place, bronze medalist(s)	6	Sweden; Truls Gisselman; William Poromaa; Jens Burman; Edvin Anger	1:08:35.5; 17:27.6; 17:11.0; 16:55.6; 17:01.3	+21.8
4	4	France; Rémi Bourdin; Hugo Lapalus; Jules Lapierre; Mathis Desloges	1:08:38.9; 17:20.8; 17:18.0; 16:51.7; 17:08.4	+25.2
5	5	Canada; Xavier McKeever; Antoine Cyr; Max Hollmann; Olivier Léveillé	1:08:39.0; 17:29.9; 17:10.3; 16:53.4; 17:05.4	+25.3
6	9	Italy; Giovanni Ticcò; Federico Pellegrino; Davide Graz; Simone Daprà	1:08:44.8; 17:31.2; 17:06.0; 16:49.8; 17:17.8	+31.1
7	7	United States; JC Schoonmaker; Zak Ketterson; Kevin Bolger; Ben Ogden	1:09:16.7; 17:27.0; 17:40.3; 17:00.0; 17:09.4	+1:03.0
8	3	Germany; Florian Notz; Albert Kuchler; Friedrich Moch; Janosch Brugger	1:09:25.9; 17:19.7; 17:56.3; 16:51.8; 17:18.1	+1:12.2
9	18	Great Britain; Gabriel Gledhill; Andrew Musgrave; Andrew Young; James Clugnet	1:10:25.7; 18:15.1; 17:29.2; 16:54.3; 17:47.1	+2:12.0
10	2	Finland; Niko Anttola; Ristomatti Hakola; Remi Lindholm; Lauri Vuorinen	1:10:26.9; 17:53.9; 17:43.5; 17:00.8; 17:48.7	+2:13.2
11	15	Czech Republic; Michal Novák; Adam Fellner; Matyáš Bauer; Jiří Tuž	1:10:36.6; 17:12.0; 18:17.4; 17:17.6; 17:49.6	+2:22.9
12	22	Austria; Benjamin Moser; Michael Föttinger; Tobias Ganner; Alexander Brandner	1:10:45.2; 17:26.1; 18:17.7; 17:02.4; 17:59.0	+2:31.5
13	10	Japan; Ryo Hirose; Naoto Baba; Daito Yamazaki; Haruki Yamashita	1:11:18.6; 17:56.9; 18:06.0; 17:22.3; 17:53.4	+3:04.9
14	11	Slovenia; Miha Šimenc; Valeriy Gontar; Miha Ličef; Vili Črv	1:12:03.8; 17:31.6; 18:25.0; 17:57.7; 18:09.5	+3:50.1
15	12	Estonia; Ralf Kivil; Christopher Kalev; Martin Himma; Henri Roos	1:13:25.6; 18:52.4; 18:38.8; 17:44.4; 18:10.0	+5:11.9
16	13	Kazakhstan; Yernar Nursbekov; Vitaliy Pukhkalo; Olzhas Klimin; Vladislav Kovalyov	1:13:33.5; 18:53.4; 18:38.7; 17:44.4; 18:17.0	+5:19.8
17	26	Poland; Piotr Jarecki; Maciej Staręga; Sebastian Bryja; Kamil Bury	1:14:08.1; 18:25.4; 19:06.3; 18:02.1; 18:34.3	+5:54.4
18	19	Romania; Paul Pepene; Florin Dolhascu; Gabriel Cojocaru; Ionuț Costea	1:14:44.8; 18:46.3; 19:04.6; 18:29.4; 18:24.5	+6:31.1
19	17	Ukraine; Oleksandr Lisohor; Ruslan Denysenko; Dmytro Drahun; Denys Muhotinov	1:17:02.7; 18:22.9; 19:37.2; 18:51.7; 20:10.9	+8:49.0
20	23	Australia; Seve de Campo; Lars Young Vik; Bentley Walker-Broose; Fedele de Campo	1:18:07.1; 18:43.9; 19:31.8; 18:57.3; 20:54.1	+9:53.4
21	24	Slovakia; Jáchym Cenek; Michal Adamov; Ján Adamov; Matej Horniak	LAP; 20:03.5; 19:39.3	
22	14	Latvia; Raimo Vīgants; Lauris Kaparkalējs; Jēkabs Skolnieks; Silvestrs Švauksts	LAP; 19:05.8; 20:21.4	
23	21	Hungary; Ádám Kónya; Ádám Büki; Csongor Ferbár; Dániel Szöllős	LAP; 19:28.4; 21:19.4	
24	27	Lithuania; Tautvydas Strolia; Modestas Vaičiulis; Matas Gražys; Daujotas Jonikas	LAP; 20:34.4; 21:34.8	
25	20	Chile; Sebastián Endrestad; Martín Flores; Sigurd Herrera; Juan Luis Uberuaga	LAP; 20:32.6	
26	16	Brazil; Manex Silva; Victor Santos; Guilherme Pereira Santos; Rhaick Bomfim	LAP; 20:55.6	
27	25	Croatia; Marko Skender; Matija Štimac; Boris Štefančić; Ivano Pelko	LAP; 20:33.9	
