= Roland Clara =

Italian cross-country skier

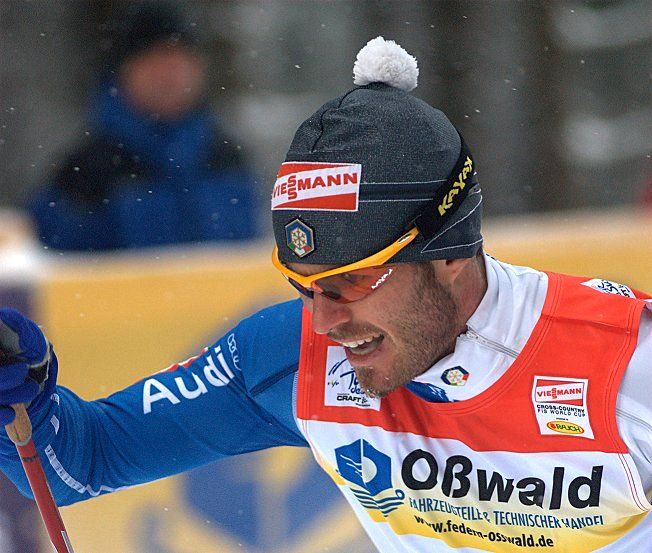
- Roland Clara in 2010

Personal information
- Nationality: Italy
- Born: 8 March 1982 (age 44) Bruneck, Italy

Sport
- Sport: Skiing
- Club: G.S. Fiamme Gialle

World Cup career
- Seasons: 12 – (2005–2016)
- Indiv. starts: 172
- Indiv. podiums: 7
- Indiv. wins: 1
- Team starts: 21
- Team podiums: 3
- Team wins: 0
- Overall titles: 0 – (17th in 2013)
- Discipline titles: 0
Medal record
Men's cross-country skiing
Representing Italy
U23 World Championships
| Silver medal – second place | 2004 Park City | Team sprint |
| Silver medal – second place | 2005 Oberstdorf | 20 km skiathlon |
| Silver medal – second place | 2005 Oberstdorf | 15 km freestyle |
| Bronze medal – third place | 2004 Park City | 20 km skiathlon |
| Bronze medal – third place | 2004 Park City | 30 km freestyle |
- Updated on 16 April 2019

Roland Clara (born 8 March 1982 in Bruneck) is an Italian cross-country skier who has competed since 2002. He finished 36th in the 50 km event at the 2010 Winter Olympics in Vancouver.

Clara's best finish at the FIS Nordic World Ski Championships was fourth in the 4 × 10 km relay at Liberec in 2009 while his best individual finish was third in the 15 km individual event in Sjusjoen.

== Cross-country skiing results ==
All results are sourced from the International Ski Federation (FIS).

=== Olympic Games ===
| Year | Age | 15 km individual | 30 km skiathlon | 50 km mass start | Sprint | 4 × 10 km relay | Team sprint |
|---|---|---|---|---|---|---|---|
| 2010 | 27 | — | — | 36 | — | — | — |
| 2014 | 31 | — | 29 | 11 | — | 5 | — |

=== World Championships ===
| Year | Age | 15 km individual | 30 km skiathlon | 50 km mass start | Sprint | 4 × 10 km relay | Team sprint |
|---|---|---|---|---|---|---|---|
| 2007 | 25 | — | 21 | — | — | 9 | — |
| 2009 | 27 | 27 | 5 | — | — | 4 | — |
| 2011 | 29 | — | 7 | 28 | — | 5 | — |
| 2013 | 30 | 21 | 20 | — | — | 4 | — |
| 2015 | 32 | 27 | 17 | — | — | 6 | — |

=== World Cup ===
==== Season standings ====
| Season | Age | Discipline standings | | | Ski Tour standings | | | |
| Season | Age | Overall | Distance | Sprint | Nordic Opening | Tour de Ski | World Cup Final | Ski Tour Canada |
|---|---|---|---|---|---|---|---|---|
| 2005 | 23 | 70 | 45 | — | —N/a | —N/a | —N/a | —N/a |
| 2006 | 24 | 80 | 54 | — | —N/a | —N/a | —N/a | —N/a |
| 2007 | 25 | 58 | 34 | NC | —N/a | — | —N/a | —N/a |
| 2008 | 26 | 48 | 29 | 97 | —N/a | — | 8 | —N/a |
| 2009 | 27 | 39 | 24 | NC | —N/a | 27 | 46 | —N/a |
| 2010 | 28 | 46 | 38 | NC | —N/a | 21 | 16 | —N/a |
| 2011 | 29 | 15 | 14 | 95 | 37 | 4 | 25 | —N/a |
| 2012 | 30 | 18 | 15 | NC | 14 | 19 | 8 | —N/a |
| 2013 | 31 | 17 | 10 | NC | 32 | 30 | 19 | —N/a |
| 2014 | 32 | 61 | 40 | NC | 21 | — | — | —N/a |
| 2015 | 33 | 16 | 21 | NC | 33 | 5 | —N/a | —N/a |
| 2016 | 34 | 109 | 65 | NC | 45 | 46 | —N/a | — |

==== Individual podiums ====
- 1 victory – (1 SWC)
- 7 podiums – (2 WC, 5 SWC)

| No. | Season | Date | Location | Race | Level | Place |
|---|---|---|---|---|---|---|
| 1 | 2010–11 | 9 January 2011 | Val di Fiemme, Italy | 9 km Pursuit F | Stage World Cup | 2nd |
| 2 | 2011–12 | 19 November 2011 | Sjusjøen, Norway | 15 km Individual F | World Cup | 3rd |
| 3 | 2011–12 | 26 November 2011 | Rukatunturi, Finland | 10 km Individual F | Stage World Cup | 2nd |
| 4 | 2011–12 | 18 March 2012 | Falun, Sweden | 15 km Pursuit F | Stage World Cup | 3rd |
| 5 | 2012–13 | 16 December 2012 | Canmore, Canada | 15 km + 15 km Skiathlon C/F | World Cup | 2nd |
| 6 | 2012–13 | 6 January 2013 | Val di Fiemme, Italy | 9 km Pursuit F | Stage World Cup | 3rd |
| 7 | 2014–15 | 11 January 2015 | Val di Fiemme, Italy | 9 km Pursuit F | Stage World Cup | 1st |

==== Team podiums ====
- 3 podiums – (3 RL)

| No. | Season | Date | Location | Race | Level | Place | Teammates |
|---|---|---|---|---|---|---|---|
| 1 | 2004–05 | 20 March 2005 | Falun, Sweden | 4 × 10 km Relay C/F | World Cup | 2nd | Checchi / Piller Cottrer / Di Centa |
| 2 | 2010–11 | 6 February 2011 | Rybinsk, Russia | 4 × 10 km Relay C/F | World Cup | 2nd | Checchi / Di Centa / Piller Cottrer |
| 3 | 2015–16 | 24 January 2016 | Nové Město, Czech Republic | 4 × 7.5 km Relay C/F | World Cup | 3rd | Nöckler / De Fabiani / Pellegrino |
