= Thomas Bing =

German cross-country skier

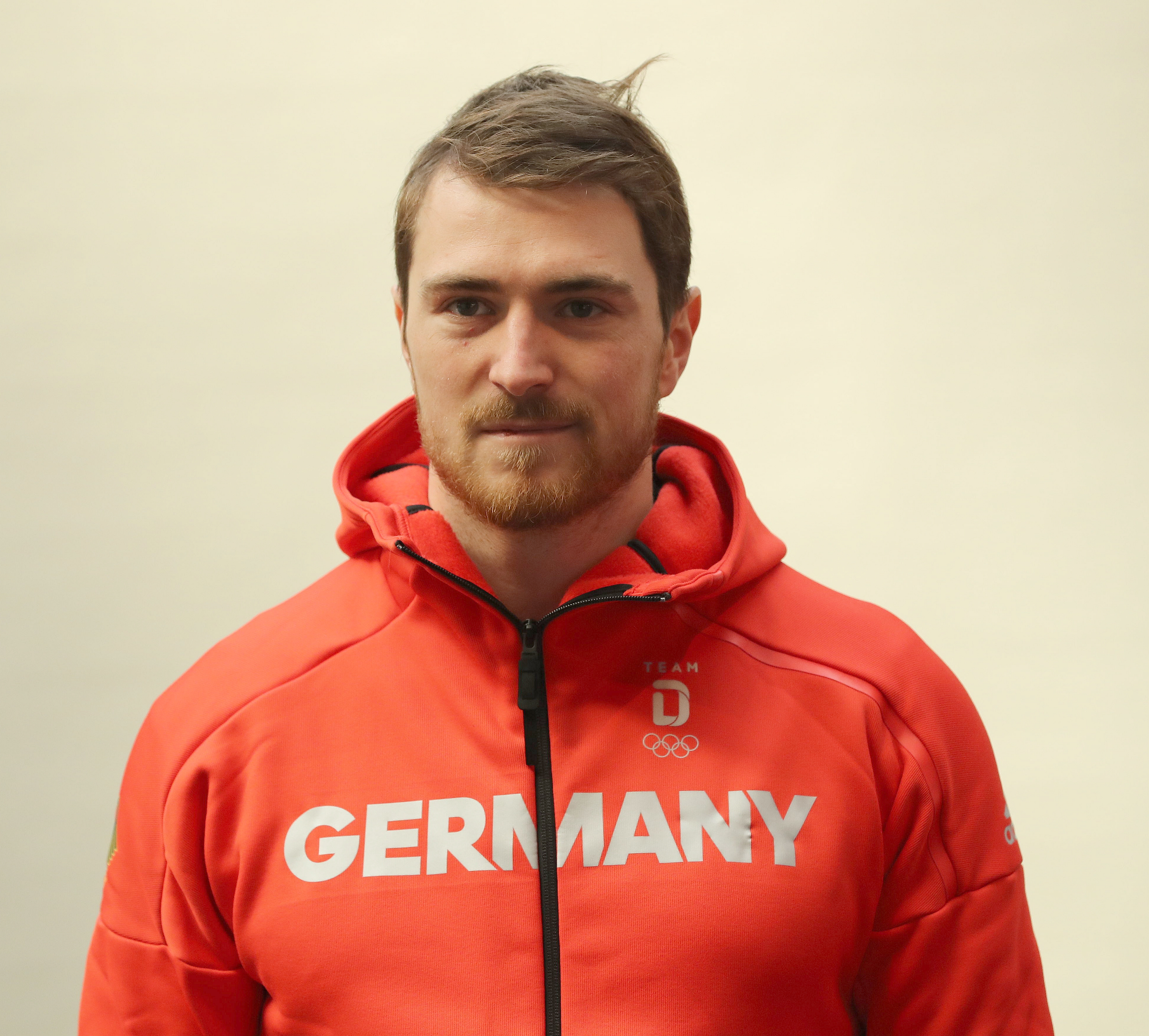

Personal information
- Nationality: Germany
- Born: 3 April 1990 (age 36) Bad Salzungen, East Germany
- Height: 1.77 m (5 ft 10 in)

Sport
- Sport: Skiing
- Club: Rhöner WSV

World Cup career
- Seasons: 11 – (2012–present)
- Indiv. starts: 151
- Indiv. podiums: 0
- Team starts: 14
- Team podiums: 0
- Overall titles: 0 – (38th in 2018)
- Discipline titles: 0
Medal record
Representing Germany
Men's cross-country skiing
U23 World Championships
Bronze medal – third place	2013 Liberec	15 km freestyle
Junior World Championships
Silver medal – second place	2008 Mals	4 × 5 km relay
Silver medal – second place	2009 Praz de Lys-Sommand	4 × 5 km relay
Bronze medal – third place	2010 Hinterzarten	4 × 5 km relay
- Updated on 21 March 2022

Thomas Bing (born 3 April 1990 in Bad Salzungen) is a German cross-country skier.

== Cross-country skiing results ==
All results are sourced from the International Ski Federation (FIS).

=== Olympic Games ===
Year	Age	15 km individual	30 km skiathlon	50 km mass start	Sprint	4 × 10 km relay	Team sprint
2014	23	—	36	36	32	—	—
2018	27	—	11	30	15	6	10

=== World Championships ===
Year	Age	15 km individual	30 km skiathlon	50 km mass start	Sprint	4 × 10 km relay	Team sprint
2015	24	—	—	42	46	7	4
2017	26	45	—	—	41	6	7
2021	30	—	—	—	49	—	—

=== World Cup ===
==== Season standings ====
Season	Age	Discipline standings			Ski Tour standings				
Season	Age	Overall	Distance	Sprint	Nordic Opening	Tour de Ski	Ski Tour 2020	World Cup Final	Ski Tour Canada
2012	22	93	68	NC	—	29	—N/a	—	—N/a
2013	23	105	67	NC	50	41	—N/a	—	—N/a
2014	24	51	32	NC	25	30	—N/a	—	—N/a
2015	25	51	32	87	45	29	—N/a	—N/a	—N/a
2016	26	79	55	80	—	DNF	—N/a	—N/a	—
2017	27	47	44	47	30	20	—N/a	22	—N/a
2018	28	38	28	NC	32	20	—N/a	35	—N/a
2019	29	89	59	NC	43	DNF	—N/a	—	—N/a
2020	30	128	83	—	—	—	—	—N/a	—N/a
2021	31	81	88	50	—	36	—N/a	—N/a	—N/a
2022	32	148	NC	84	—N/a	DNF	—N/a	—N/a	—N/a
2023	33				—N/a	DNF	—N/a	—N/a	—N/a
