= Roman Furger =

Swiss cross-country skier

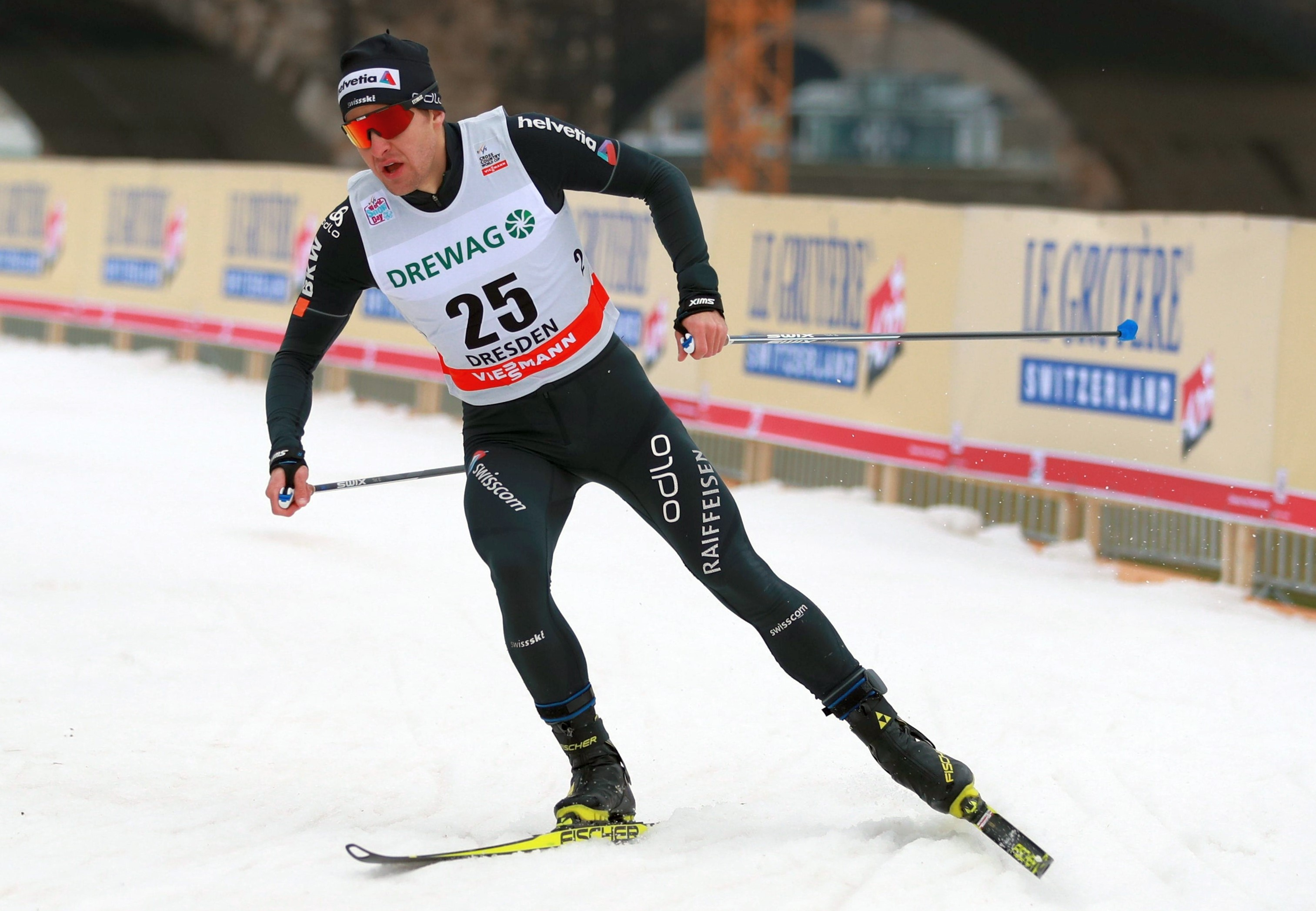
- Roman Furger in January, 2018

Personal information
- Nationality: Switzerland
- Born: 10 February 1990 (age 36) Altdorf, Uri, Switzerland

Sport
- Sport: Skiing
- Club: Schattdorf

World Cup career
- Seasons: 14 – (2010–2023)
- Indiv. starts: 151
- Indiv. podiums: 0
- Team starts: 13
- Team podiums: 2
- Team wins: 0
- Overall titles: 0 – (40th in 2020)
- Discipline titles: 0
Medal record
Men's cross-country skiing
Representing Switzerland
Junior World Championships
Bronze medal – third place	2012 Erzurum	Individual sprint

Roman Furger (born 10 February 1990) is a Swiss, former cross-country skier who represented the club Schattdorf.

He competed at the FIS Nordic World Ski Championships 2017 in Lahti, Finland.

He announced his retirement from cross-country skiing on March 8, 2023.

== Cross-country skiing results ==
All results are sourced from the International Ski Federation (FIS).

=== Olympic Games ===
Year	Age	15 km individual	30 km skiathlon	50 km mass start	Sprint	4 × 10 km relay	Team sprint
2018	28	12	—	—	—	11	11
2022	32	—	—	11^{[a]}	—	7	—

^{a} Distance reduced to 30 km due to weather conditions.

=== World Championships ===
Year	Age	15 km individual	30 km skiathlon	50 km mass start	Sprint	4 × 10 km relay	Team sprint
2017	27	—	—	17	25	—	9
2019	29	—	—	53	38	—	—
2021	31	54	—	—	—	5	9
2023	33	DNS	34	—	—	—	—

=== World Cup ===
==== Season standings ====
Season	Age	Discipline standings			Ski Tour standings				
Season	Age	Overall	Distance	Sprint	Nordic Opening	Tour de Ski	Ski Tour 2020	World Cup Final	Ski Tour Canada
2010	20	NC	NC	—	—N/a	—	—N/a	—	—N/a
2011	21	NC	—	NC	—	—	—N/a	—	—N/a
2012	22	NC	NC	NC	—	DNF	—N/a	—	—N/a
2013	23	134	85	NC	DNF	DNF	—N/a	—	—N/a
2014	24	NC	NC	NC	—	—	—N/a	—	—N/a
2015	25	97	88	50	70	DNF	—N/a	—N/a	—N/a
2016	26	99	88	56	60	DNF	—N/a	—N/a	—
2017	27	48	64	29	—	DNF	—N/a	20	—N/a
2018	28	87	76	55	41	DNF	—N/a	DNF	—N/a
2019	29	71	67	48	35	DNF	—N/a	41	—N/a
2020	30	40	39	64	—	27	15	—N/a	—N/a
2021	31	47	48	37	—	29	—N/a	—N/a	—N/a
2022	32	62	51	48	—N/a	33	—N/a	—N/a	—N/a
2023	33	75	47	111	—N/a	38	—N/a	—N/a	—N/a

==== Team podiums ====
- 2 podiums – (1 RL, 1 TS)

No.	Season	Date	Location	Race	Level	Place	Teammate(s)
1	2019–20	1 March 2020	Lahti, Finland	4 × 7.5 km Relay C/F	World Cup	2nd	Klee / Cologna / Rüesch
2	2020–21	7 February 2021	Ulricehamn, Sweden	6 x 1.5 km Team Sprint F	World Cup	2nd	Hediger
