= Andriy Orlyk =

Ukrainian cross-country skier

Personal information
- Full name: Andriy Vyacheslavovych Orlyk
- Born: 6 March 1998 (age 28) Shostka, Sumy Oblast, Ukraine
- Height: 177 cm (5 ft 10 in)

Sport
- Sport: Skiing

World Cup career
- Seasons: 2016 -
- Updated on 7 February 2018

Andriy Vyacheslavovych Orlyk (Ukrainian: Андрій В'ячеславович Орлик; born 6 March 1998, in Shostka, Sumy Oblast, Ukraine) is a cross-country skier and biathlete from Ukraine. He represented Ukraine at the 2018 Winter Olympics.

== Career ==
He took up the sport at age seven in home town of Shostka, Ukraine. Orlyk started his career at major competitions in January 2015 when he finished 4th and 6th at 2015 European Youth Olympic Winter Festival in Steg, Liechtenstein. Next winter he competed at the 2016 Winter Youth Olympics in Lillehammer. There he was 5th in 10 km freestyle race.

Andrii participated at two World Championships in 2015 and 2017. Andrii's best personal performance is 59th in 15 km classical race in 2015.

At World Cup Orlyk debuted on 11 December 2016, in Davos, Switzerland, where he was 91st in sprint competition. As of February 2018, his best World Cup achievement was 70th rank in 15 km classical style in Estonian Otepää on 19 February 2017.

== Personal life ==
He is a student of Sumy State Pedagogical University.

== Career results ==
=== Winter Olympics ===
Year	Place	Freestyle	Skiathlon	Classical	Relay	Sprint	Team sprint
2018	Pyeongchang, South Korea					73	

=== World Championships ===
Year	Event	Freestyle	Skiathlon	Classical	Relay	Sprint	Team sprint
2015	Falun, Sweden				17	75	19
2017	Kontiolahti, Finland			59	LPD	85	
