= Simone Daprà =

Italian cross-country skier (born 1997)

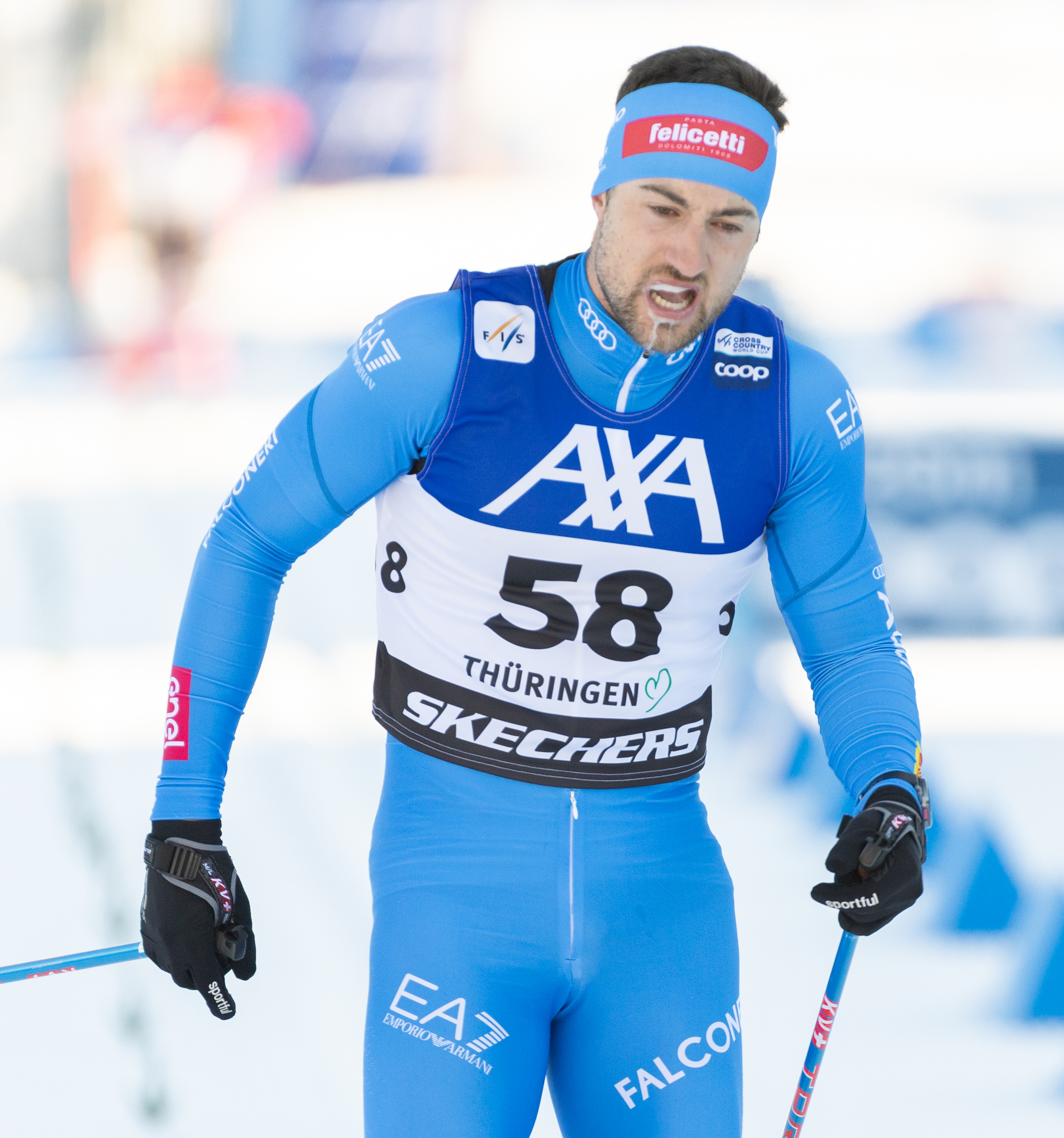
- Daprà in 2026

Personal information
- Born: 19 June 1997 (age 29) Panchià, Italy

Sport
- Sport: Skiing

Simone Daprà (born 19 June 1997) is an Italian cross-country skier who competes in international competitions including the FIS Cross-Country World Cup and the FIS Nordic World Ski Championships. He represents the Italian police sports group Fiamme Oro and is a member of the Italian national cross-country skiing team.

== Early life ==
Daprà was born in Panchià, in the Val di Fiemme valley of Trentino, Italy, an area known for cross-country skiing competitions and training facilities.His family has a strong connection with the sport, and he grew up in a region that regularly hosts major international Nordic skiing events.

== Career ==
Daprà competes internationally as part of the Italian national cross-country skiing team and has participated in FIS Cross-Country World Cup events and world championship competitions.

He represented Italy at the 2025 FIS Nordic World Ski Championships in Trondheim, where he achieved a 21st-place finish in the skiathlon, his best individual result at a world championship at the time.

At the same championships, Daprà also competed in the men's 50 km race and finished 29th, describing the race conditions as among the most difficult he had experienced.

Daprà has also been part of the Italian men's relay team in international competitions. Italy finished sixth in the men's relay at the 2025 World Championships in Trondheim, a result achieved by a team that included several members of the Italian national squad.

For the 2025–26 season, he was named to Italy's senior A-team for cross-country skiing by the Italian Winter Sports Federation (FISI).

He has also competed in national competitions in Italy, including the Italian relay championships, where teams including Daprà have finished on the podium.

== Personal life ==
Outside of competition, Daprà enjoys outdoor activities such as fishing and mushroom picking.
