= FIS Nordic World Ski Championships 2015 – Men's 4 × 10 kilometre relay =

Men's 4 × 10 kilometre relay at the FIS Nordic World Ski Championships 2015
- Date: 27 February 2015
- Competitors: 68 from 17 nations
- Winning time: 1:34:18.5

Medalists
gold medal	Niklas Dyrhaug; Didrik Tønseth; Anders Gløersen; Petter Northug	Norway
silver medal	Daniel Rickardsson; Johan Olsson; Marcus Hellner; Calle Halfvarsson	Sweden
bronze medal	Jean-Marc Gaillard; Maurice Manificat; Robin Duvillard; Adrien Backscheider	France

The men's 4 × 10 kilometre relay event of the FIS Nordic World Ski Championships 2015 was held on 27 February 2015.

== Results ==
The race was started at 13:30.

Rank	Bib	Country	Athlete	Time	Deficit
1st place, gold medalist(s)	4	Norway	Niklas Dyrhaug; Didrik Tønseth; Anders Gløersen; Petter Northug	1:34:18.5; 27:39.1; 27:41.9; 19:02.8; 19:54.7	
2nd place, silver medalist(s)	1	Sweden	Daniel Rickardsson; Johan Olsson; Marcus Hellner; Calle Halfvarsson	1:34:19.1; 27:56.5; 27:10.4; 19.23.3; 19:48.9	+0.6
3rd place, bronze medalist(s)	3	France	Jean-Marc Gaillard; Maurice Manificat; Robin Duvillard; Adrien Backscheider	1:34:27.4; 27:57.2; 27:16.4; 19.14.0; 19:59.8	+8.9
4	2	Russia	Maxim Vylegzhanin; Alexander Bessmertnykh; Alexander Legkov; Evgeniy Belov	1:34:49.5; 27:41.0; 27:58.3; 19:25.2; 19:45.0	+31.0
5	7	Switzerland	Ueli Schnider; Dario Cologna; Jonas Baumann; Toni Livers	1:36:21.5; 28:45.9; 27:29.8; 20:05.1; 20:00.7	+2:03.0
6	5	Italy	Francesco de Fabiani; Dietmar Nöckler; Roland Clara; Federico Pellegrino	1:36:45.7; 27:56.9; 28:40.5; 19:41.3; 20:27.0	+2:27.2
7	9	Germany	Jonas Dobler; Thomas Bing; Florian Notz; Tim Tscharnke	1:36:57.5; 27:39.7; 29:19.3; 19:54.7; 20:03.8	+2:39.0
8	6	Finland	Sami Jauhojärvi; Iivo Niskanen; Matti Heikkinen; Ville Nousiainen	1:36:57.5; 27:37.3; 28:06.0; 21:06.0; 20:07.3	+2:39.0
9	8	Czech Republic	Aleš Razym; Martin Jakš; Dušan Kožíšek; Petr Knop	1:37:03.1; 28:29.3; 28:05.7; 19:44.2; 20:43.9	+2:44.6
10	12	Canada	Alex Harvey; Graeme Killick; Ivan Babikov; Len Väljas	1:37:22.0; 27:36.0; 29:02.5; 20:21.7; 20:21.8	+3:03.5
11	11	United States	Erik Bjornsen; Noah Hoffman; Kyle Bratrud; Simi Hamilton	1:37:23.4; 28:08.9; 28:27.0; 20.26.5; 20:21.0	+3:04.9
12	16	Japan	Akira Lenting; Keishin Yoshida; Takatsugu Uda; Hiroyuki Miyazawa	1:38:08.5; 28:28.8; 28:29.4; 20:37.5; 20:32.8	+3:50.0
13	13	Kazakhstan	Alexey Poltoranin; Yevgeniy Velichko; Nikolay Chebotko; Rinat Mukhin	1:38:28.6; 27:37.7; 28:57.1; 20:15.5; 21:38.3	+4:10.1
14	14	Belarus	Michail Semenov; Aliaksandr Voranau; Sergei Dolidovich; Yury Astapenka	LAP; 28:19.3; 29:52.2; LAP	
15	15	Poland	Maciej Kreczmer; Sebastian Gazurek; Jan Antolec; Maciej Staręga	LAP; 28:29.8; 31:01.7; LAP	
16	10	Estonia	Karel Tammjärv; Aivar Rehemaa; Raido Ränkel; Peeter Kümmel	LAP; 29:23.0; 30:09.4; LAP	
17	17	Ukraine	Oleksiy Krasovsky; Andriy Orlyk; Ruslan Perekhoda; Kostyantyn Yaremenko	LAP; 29:47.7; LAP	
