= FIS Nordic World Ski Championships 2015 – Men's team sprint =

Men's team sprint at the FIS Nordic World Ski Championships 2015
- Date: 22 February 2015
- Competitors: 56 from 28 nations
- Winning time: 15:32.89

Medalists
gold medal	Finn Hågen Krogh; Petter Northug	Norway
silver medal	Alexey Petukhov; Nikita Kryukov	Russia
bronze medal	Dietmar Nöckler; Federico Pellegrino	Italy

The Men's team sprint event of the FIS Nordic World Ski Championships 2015 was held on 22 February 2015.

== Results ==
=== Semifinals ===
Semifinal 1

Rank	Heat	Bib	Country	Athletes	Time	Note
1	1	1	Norway	Finn Hågen Krogh; Petter Northug	15:43.06	Q
2	1	2	Russia	Alexey Petukhov; Nikita Kryukov	15:43.40	Q
3	1	5	United States	Andrew Newell; Simi Hamilton	15:43.76	q
4	1	6	Poland	Maciej Kreczmer; Maciej Staręga	15:44.02	q
5	1	3	Germany	Thomas Bing; Tim Tscharnke	15:44.09	q
6	1	4	Belarus	Sergei Dolidovich; Michail Semenov	15:45.13	
7	1	7	Canada	Jesse Cockney; Len Väljas	15:45.33	
8	1	9	Switzerland	Roman Schaad; Gianluca Cologna	15:54.66	
9	1	8	Kazakhstan	Mark Starostin; Nikolay Chebotko	16:22.88	
10	1	11	Lithuania	Modestas Vaičiulis; Stepan Terentjev	17:03.99	
11	1	10	Slovakia	Peter Mlynár; Andrej Segeč	17:26.01	
12	1	13	Denmark	Lasse Hulgaard; Karl Kristensen	17:34.19	
13	1	12	Hungary	Károly Gombos; Ádám Kónya	17:44.03	
14	1	14	Greece	Apostolos Angelis; Kleanthis Karamichas	18:34.53	

Semifinal 2

Rank	Heat	Bib	Country	Athletes	Time	Note
1	2	16	Italy	Dietmar Nöckler; Federico Pellegrino	15:34.02	Q
2	2	17	France	Robin Duvillard; Baptiste Gros	15:34.25	Q
3	2	15	Sweden	Calle Halfvarsson; Teodor Peterson	15:34.26	q
4	2	22	Czech Republic	Aleš Razým; Dušan Kožíšek	15:34.52	q
5	2	18	Finland	Ville Nousiainen; Martti Jylhä	15:41.24	q
6	2	20	Austria	Harald Wurm; Bernhard Tritscher	15:45.20	
7	2	21	Estonia	Raido Ränkel; Peeter Kümmel	15:57.41	
8	2	19	Japan	Akira Lenting; Hiroyuki Miyazawa	16:05.13	
9	2	23	Romania	Petrică Hogiu; Paul Constantin Pepene	16:12.48	
10	2	25	Ukraine	Ruslan Perekhoda; Andriy Orlyk	16:57.40	
11	2	26	Bulgaria	Stanimir Belomazhev; Yordan Chuchuganov	16:57.96	
12	2	24	Australia	Phillip Bellingham; Paul Kovacs	17:20.15	
13	2	27	Iceland	Sævar Birgisson; Brynjar Kristinsson	17:35.06	
14	2	28	China	Xin Detao; Shang Jincai	18:11.07	

=== Final ===
The final was held at 15:03.

Rank	Bib	Country	Athletes	Time	Deficit
1st place, gold medalist(s)	1	Norway	Finn Hågen Krogh; Petter Northug	15:32.89	
2nd place, silver medalist(s)	2	Russia	Alexey Petukhov; Nikita Kryukov	15:38.53	+5.64
3rd place, bronze medalist(s)	16	Italy	Dietmar Nöckler; Federico Pellegrino	15:38.62	+5.73
4	3	Germany	Thomas Bing; Tim Tscharnke	15:39.00	+6.11
5	18	Finland	Ville Nousiainen; Martti Jylhä	15:46.55	+13.66
6	22	Czech Republic	Aleš Razým; Dušan Kožíšek	15:49.62	+16.73
7	5	United States	Andrew Newell; Simi Hamilton	15:50.37	+17.48
8	6	Poland	Maciej Kreczmer; Maciej Staręga	15:59.35	+26.46
9	15	Sweden	Calle Halfvarsson; Teodor Peterson	16:20.32	+47.43
10	17	France	Robin Duvillard; Baptiste Gros	16:33.93	+1:01.04
