= FIS Nordic World Ski Championships 2017 – Men's team sprint =

Men's team sprint event on FIS Nordic World Ski Championship 2017

Men's team sprint at the FIS Nordic World Ski Championships 2017
- Location: Lahti, Finland
- Date: 26 February
- Competitors: 48 from 24 nations
- Teams: 24
- Winning time: 17:40.6

Medalists
gold medal	Nikita Kryukov; Sergey Ustiugov	Russia
silver medal	Dietmar Nöckler; Federico Pellegrino	Italy
bronze medal	Sami Jauhojärvi; Iivo Niskanen	Finland

The Men's team sprint event of the FIS Nordic World Ski Championships 2017 was held on 26 February 2017.

== Results ==
=== Semifinals ===
The semifinals were started at 12:20.

Semifinal A

Rank	Heat	Bib	Country	Athletes	Time	Deficit	Note
1	A	1	Norway	Johannes Høsflot Klæbo; Emil Iversen	17:59.6	—	Q
2	A	4	Sweden	Emil Jönsson; Teodor Peterson	18:00.6	+1,0	Q
3	A	2	Italy	Dietmar Nöckler; Federico Pellegrino	18:01.2	+1.6	q
4	A	5	Germany	Thomas Bing; Sebastian Eisenlauer	18:13.6	+14.0	q
5	A	6	Poland	Dominik Bury; Maciej Staręga	18:14.0	+14.4	q
6	A	3	France	Richard Jouve; Lucas Chanavat	18:18.8	+19.2	out
7	A	7	Estonia	Marko Kilp; Raido Ränkel	18:40.1	+40.5	out
8	A	9	Ukraine	Oleksiy Krasovsky; Ruslan Perekhoda	18:55.0	+55.4	out
9	A	8	Austria	Dominik Baldauf; Luis Stadlober	19:06.8	+1:07.2	out
10	A	10	Lithuania	Modestas Vaičiulis; Tautvydas Strolia	19:43.0	+1:43.4	out
11	A	11	Slovakia	Andrej Segeč; Miroslav Šulek	19:43.9	+1:44.3	out
12	A	12	Colombia	Paul Martin Bragiel; Jhon Acevedo	LAP		out

Semifinal B

Rank	Heat	Bib	Country	Athletes	Time	Deficit	Note
1	B	14	Finland	Sami Jauhojärvi; Iivo Niskanen	18:10.6	—	Q
2	B	16	Russia	Nikita Kryukov; Sergey Ustiugov	18:10.9	+0.3	Q
3	B	13	Canada	Alex Harvey; Len Väljas	18:12.2	+1.6	q
4	B	15	United States	Simeon Hamilton; Erik Bjornsen	18:12.9	+2.3	q
5	B	17	Switzerland	Roman Furger; Jovian Hediger	18:13.2	+2.6	q
6	B	20	Czech Republic	Michal Novák; Aleš Razým	18:21.8	+11.2	out
7	B	22	Slovenia	Miha Šimenc; Janez Lampič	18:30.2	+19.6	out
8	B	18	Belarus	Michail Semenov; Mikhail Kuklin	18:32.2	+21.6	out
9	B	19	Kazakhstan	Ivan Lyuft; Alexey Poltoranin	18:42.1	+31.5	out
10	B	23	Australia	Phillip Bellingham; Paul Kovacs	19:36.6	+1:26.0	out
11	B	21	Romania	Petrică Hogiu; Alin Florin Cioancă	19:49.6	+1:39.0	out
12	B	24	Iceland	Sævar Birgisson; Albert Jónsson	21:10.1	+2:59.0	out

=== Final ===
The final was started at 14:00.

Rank	Bib	Country	Athletes	Time	Deficit
1st place, gold medalist(s)	16	Russia	Nikita Kryukov; Sergey Ustiugov	17:40.6	—
2nd place, silver medalist(s)	2	Italy	Dietmar Nöckler; Federico Pellegrino	17:42.8	+2.2
3rd place, bronze medalist(s)	14	Finland	Sami Jauhojärvi; Iivo Niskanen	17:49.3	+8.7
4	1	Norway	Johannes Høsflot Klæbo; Emil Iversen	17:59.1	+18.5
5	15	United States	Simeon Hamilton; Erik Bjornsen	18:04.2	+23.6
6	13	Canada	Alex Harvey; Len Väljas	18:07.7	+27.1
7	5	Germany	Thomas Bing; Sebastian Eisenlauer	18:11.6	+31.0
8	4	Sweden	Emil Jönsson; Teodor Peterson	18:12.4	+31.8
9	17	Switzerland	Roman Furger; Jovian Hediger	18:45.4	+1:04.8
10	6	Poland	Dominik Bury; Maciej Staręga	18:55.7	+1:15.1
