= FIS Nordic World Ski Championships 2015 – Men's 30 kilometre pursuit =

Men's 30 kilometre skiathlon at the FIS Nordic World Ski Championships 2015
- Date: 21 February 2015
- Competitors: 63 from 27 nations
- Winning time: 1:16.25.9

Medalists
gold medal	Maxim Vylegzhanin	Russia
silver medal	Dario Cologna	Switzerland
bronze medal	Alex Harvey	Canada

The Men's 30 kilometre pursuit event of the FIS Nordic World Ski Championships 2015 was held on 21 February 2015.

== Results ==
The race started at 14:30.

Rank	Bib	Athlete	Country	Time	Deficit
1st place, gold medalist(s)	6	Maxim Vylegzhanin	Russia	1:16:25.9	
2nd place, silver medalist(s)	1	Dario Cologna	Switzerland	1:16:26.3	+0.4
3rd place, bronze medalist(s)	9	Alex Harvey	Canada	1:16:27.5	+1.6
4	12	Didrik Tønseth	Norway	1:16:29.3	+3.4
5	7	Maurice Manificat	France	1:16:36.1	+10.2
6	3	Calle Halfvarsson	Sweden	1:16:48.7	+22.8
7	5	Niklas Dyrhaug	Norway	1:16:51.8	+25.9
8	2	Evgeniy Belov	Russia	1:16:52.6	+26.7
9	17	Jean-Marc Gaillard	France	1:16:53.5	+27.6
10	13	Marcus Hellner	Sweden	1:16:57.8	+31.9
11	4	Petter Northug	Norway	1:17:05.1	+39.2
12	27	Andrew Musgrave	Great Britain	1:17:56.6	+1:30.7
13	11	Stanislav Volzhentsev	Russia	1:17:59.8	+1:33.9
14	22	Lars Nelson	Sweden	1:18:03.2	+1:37.3
15	18	Ilia Chernousov	Russia	1:18:03.3	+1:37.4
16	10	Matti Heikkinen	Finland	1:18:12.9	+1:47.0
17	14	Roland Clara	Italy	1:18:17.9	+1:52.0
18	39	Michail Semenov	Belarus	1:18:37.5	+2:11.6
19	29	Adrien Backscheider	France	1:18:53.0	+2:27.1
20	36	Keishin Yoshida	Japan	1:18:57.7	+2:31.8
21	8	Alexey Poltoranin	Kazakhstan	1:19:04.4	+2:38.5
22	21	Lari Lehtonen	Finland	1:19:07.3	+2:41.4
23	20	Ivan Babikov	Canada	1:19:09.7	+2:43.8
24	31	Clément Parisse	France	1:19:13.1	+2:47.2
25	38	Akira Lenting	Japan	1:19:18.9	+2:53.0
26	15	Iivo Niskanen	Finland	1:19:19.4	+2:53.5
27	32	Jonas Dobler	Germany	1:19:19.6	+2:53.7
28	47	Erik Bjornsen	United States	1:19:19.9	+2:54.0
29	52	Aivar Rehemaa	Estonia	1:19:24.6	+2:58.7
30	24	Jonas Baumann	Switzerland	1:19:25.9	+3:00.0
31	23	Martin Jakš	Czech Republic	1:19:53.3	+3:27.4
32	30	David Hofer	Italy	1:20:03.2	+3:37.3
33	48	Paul Constantin Pepene	Romania	1:20:04.3	+3:38.4
34	28	Sami Jauhojärvi	Finland	1:20:07.9	+3:42.0
35	26	Martin Johansson	Sweden	1:20:57.5	+4:31.6
36	55	Yury Astapenka	Belarus	1:20:58.6	+4:32.7
37	46	Takatsugu Uda	Japan	1:21:03.7	+4:37.8
38	42	Martin Bajčičák	Slovakia	1:21:48.0	+5:22.1
39	43	Veselin Tsinzov	Bulgaria	1:21:50.6	+5:24.7
40	16	Francesco De Fabiani	Italy	1:22:24.8	+5:58.9
41	54	Yerdos Akhmadiyev	Kazakhstan	1:22:28.3	+6:02.4
42	49	Max Hauke	Austria	1:22:29.6	+6:03.7
43	50	Karel Tammjärv	Estonia	1:23:26.0	+7:00.1
44	34	Noah Hoffman	United States	1:23:35.0	+7:09.1
45	40	Sergey Mikayelyan	Armenia	1:23:52.7	+7:26.8
46	53	Petr Knop	Czech Republic	1:23:58.5	+7:32.6
47	25	Florian Notz	Germany	1:24:07.3	+7:41.4
48	33	Kris Freeman	United States	1:24:23.0	+7:57.1
49	56	Oleksiy Krasovsky	Ukraine	1:24:43.5	+8:17.6
50	51	Jan Šrail	Czech Republic	1:24:50.8	+8:24.9
51	44	Yevgeniy Velichko	Kazakhstan	1:26:05.6	+9:39.7
52	61	Petrică Hogiu	Romania	1:26:20.4	+9:54.5
53	41	Imanol Rojo	Spain	1:27:30.9	+11:05.0
54	37	Matthew Gelso	United States	1:27:52.3	+11:26.4
55	62	Artur Yeghoyan	Armenia	1:28:29.8	+12:03.9
56	58	Andrew Pohl	New Zealand	1:28:59.9	+12:34.0
57	63	Kostyantyn Yaremenko	Ukraine	1:30:04.2	+13:38.3
58	65	Shang Jincai	China	LAP	
59	64	Brynjar Leó Kristinsson	Iceland	LAP	
60	59	Cho Yong-jin	South Korea	LAP	
	19	Sjur Røthe	Norway	DNF	
	35	Sergei Dolidovich	Belarus	DNF	
	45	Sergey Malyshev	Kazakhstan	DNF	
	57	Edi Dadić	Croatia	DNS	
	60	Callum Watson	Australia	DNS	
	66	Sattar Seid	Iran	DNS	
