= Nordic Opening =

Annual cross-country skiing event

Race details
- Date: November
- Venue(s): Lillehammer, Norway or Ruka, Finland
- Competition: FIS Cross-Country World Cup
- Type: Mini-tour
- Organiser: International Ski Federation

History
- First edition: 26 November 2010; 15 years ago
- Editions: 11 (as of 2020)

Men
- First winner: Alexander Legkov (RUS)
- Most wins: Martin Johnsrud Sundby (NOR) (4 wins)
- Most recent: Johannes Høsflot Klæbo (NOR)

Ladies
- First winner: Marit Bjørgen (NOR)
- Most wins: Marit Bjørgen (NOR) (5 wins)
- Most recent: Therese Johaug (NOR)

The Nordic Opening is a cross-country skiing event held annually since the 2010–11 season in Ruka, Finland or Lillehammer, Norway. The Nordic Opening is a Stage World Cup event in the FIS Cross-Country World Cup, and are held as the first or second World Cup race weekend of the season. The inaugural Nordic Opening was held in 2010 and was originally named Ruka Triple. The editions of the mini-tour hosted in Lillehammer is also known as Lillehammer Triple. Each Nordic Opening consists of three stages; a sprint, an individual race and a pursuit. As of 2019, the prize money for the event amount to 240,000 Swiss francs, shared out on both men and women. Men's and women's events are held together on the same days, with the only difference being the distance skied.

The first stages was arranged on 26 November 2010 and were won by Marit Bjørgen (ladies) and John Kristian Dahl (men). Marit Bjørgen and Alexander Legkov of Russia won the first overall Nordic Opening.

== Venues ==
Year	Venue
2010	(Finland) Ruka
2011	(Finland) Ruka
2012	(Finland) Ruka
2013	(Finland) Ruka
2014	(Norway) Lillehammer
2015	(Finland) Ruka
2016	(Norway) Lillehammer
2017	(Finland) Ruka
2018	(Norway) Lillehammer
2019	(Finland) Ruka
2020	(Finland) Ruka

== Race structure ==
=== Ranking ===
Bonus seconds for the top 30 positions by type
Type		1	2	3	4	5	6	7	8	9	10	11	12	13–15	16–20	21–25	26–30
Finish	Sprint	30	27	24	23	22	21	16	15	14	13	12	11	5	4	3	2
Finish	Interval start	none															
Finish	Pursuit	none															

The overall results are based on the aggregate time for all events, as well as bonus seconds awarded on the sprint stage, which are subtracted from the athlete's overall time. As of 2019, bonus seconds are awarded to the 30 skiers that qualify for the quarter-finals.

The final stage of the race is held in a pursuit format, with competitors starting with the gaps they have in the overall classification, so the first skier to reach the finish line is the overall winner.

=== Prizes ===
Prizes and bonuses are awarded for daily placings and final placings at the end of the race. In 2019, the winners received CHF 22,500, while each of the stage winners won CHF 5,000.

== Stages ==
=== Stage 1: Sprint ===
The first stage in the Nordic Opening is a sprint. A sprint consists of two rounds; a qualification round and a final round with a knock-out competition format. The 30 fastest skiers in the qualification round qualify for the final round quarter-finals. In the quarter-, and semi-finals, the skiers compete in heats of six and the two best skiers in each heat are guaranteed progression, while the two fastest non-guaranteed progression times move on as "lucky losers". 12 skiers advance from the quarter-finals to the semi-finals of which six advance to the final. The winners are rewarded, as of 2019, 30 bonus seconds. The bonus seconds awarded on the sprint stage are meant to encourage sprinter specialists to go for results in the overall standings.

=== Stage 2: Interval start ===
The second stage in the Nordic Opening is an interval start, or time trial stage. Skiers are sent out from the start in 30 second intervals. The interval start stage was 5 km for women and 10 km for men from the first event in 2010, but has since 2017 been a race over 10 km for women and 15 km for men.

=== Stage 3: Pursuit ===
The third and ultimate stage of the mini-tour is a pursuit with starting intervals equal to the skiers accumulative times in the overall standings; which means that the first skier to cross the finish line is the winner of the Nordic Opening. The stage's length have in every edition been 10 km for women and 15 km for men. If the overall time differences are big before the last stage, the race jury can decide that the lowest ranked skiers start in a wave start.

== Overall winners ==
=== Men ===
Year	Winner	Second	Third
2010	(Russia) Alexander Legkov	(Switzerland) Dario Cologna	(Sweden) Daniel Rickardsson
2011	(Norway) Petter Northug	(Switzerland) Dario Cologna	(Norway) Eldar Rønning
2012	(Norway) Petter Northug	(Russia) Maxim Vylegzhanin	(Kazakhstan) Alexey Poltoranin
2013	(Norway) Martin Johnsrud Sundby	(Russia) Maxim Vylegzhanin	(Russia) Alexander Legkov
2014	(Norway) Martin Johnsrud Sundby	(Norway) Finn Hågen Krogh	(Norway) Sjur Røthe
2015	(Norway) Martin Johnsrud Sundby	(Norway) Petter Northug	(Norway) Finn Hågen Krogh
2016	(Norway) Martin Johnsrud Sundby	(Norway) Johannes Høsflot Klæbo	(Finland) Matti Heikkinen
2017	(Norway) Johannes Høsflot Klæbo	(Norway) Martin Johnsrud Sundby	(Russia) Alexander Bolshunov
2018	(Norway) Didrik Tønseth	(Norway) Sjur Røthe	(Norway) Emil Iversen
2019	(Norway) Johannes Høsflot Klæbo	(Norway) Emil Iversen	(Finland) Iivo Niskanen
2020	(Norway) Johannes Høsflot Klæbo	(Russia) Alexander Bolshunov	(Norway) Emil Iversen

=== Women ===
Year	Winner	Second	Third
2010	(Norway) Marit Bjørgen	(Poland) Justyna Kowalczyk	(Sweden) Charlotte Kalla
2011	(Norway) Marit Bjørgen	(Norway) Therese Johaug	(Norway) Vibeke Skofterud
2012	(Norway) Marit Bjørgen	(Poland) Justyna Kowalczyk	(Norway) Heidi Weng
2013	(Norway) Marit Bjørgen	(Sweden) Charlotte Kalla	(Norway) Therese Johaug
2014	(Norway) Marit Bjørgen	(Norway) Therese Johaug	(Norway) Heidi Weng
2015	(Norway) Therese Johaug	(Sweden) Stina Nilsson	(Norway) Ingvild Flugstad Østberg
2016	(Norway) Heidi Weng	(Norway) Ingvild Flugstad Østberg	(Finland) Krista Pärmäkoski
2017	(Sweden) Charlotte Kalla	(Norway) Marit Bjørgen	(Norway) Ragnhild Haga
2018	(Norway) Therese Johaug	(Sweden) Ebba Andersson	(Norway) Ingvild Flugstad Østberg
2019	(Norway) Therese Johaug	(Norway) Heidi Weng	(Norway) Astrid Uhrenholdt Jacobsen
2020	(Norway) Therese Johaug	(Russia) Tatiana Sorina	(Sweden) Ebba Andersson

== Records and statistics ==
=== Overall winners ===
Four skiers have won the Nordic Opening two or more times. Marit Bjørgen (NOR) is the only skier to win five times. Martin Johnsrud Sundby (NOR) has won the Nordic Opening four times.

Men
Wins	Skier	Editions
4	Martin Johnsrud Sundby (NOR)	2013, 2014, 2015, 2016
3	Johannes Høsflot Klæbo (NOR)	2017, 2019, 2020
2	Petter Northug (NOR)	2011, 2012
1	Alexander Legkov (RUS)	2010
1	Didrik Tønseth (NOR)	2018

Women
Wins	Skier	Editions
5	Marit Bjørgen (NOR)	2010, 2011, 2012, 2013, 2014
4	Therese Johaug (NOR)	2015, 2018, 2019, 2020
1	Heidi Weng (NOR)	2016
1	Charlotte Kalla (SWE)	2017

==== Overall winners without stage wins ====
The following skiers have won the Nordic Opening without winning any of the three stages: Alexander Legkov (2010), Petter Northug (2012), Marit Bjørgen (2013), Martin Johnsrud Sundby (2016), Charlotte Kalla (2017) and Didrik Tønseth (2018).

=== Stage wins ===
4 men and 4 women have won two or more stages in the Nordic Opening. Therese Johaug has won the most stages with 10, followed by Marit Bjørgen's 9 stage wins. Bjørgen (2012) is the only skier to win all three stages in one Nordic Opening. Johannes Høsflot Klæbo and Martin Johnsrud Sundby have won three stages each, most among the men.

Skiers who are still active are indicated in bold. Skiers with the same number of stage wins are listed alphabetically.

Men
Rank	Name	Country	Wins
1	**Johannes Høsflot Klæbo**	Norway	4
2	**Martin Johnsrud Sundby**	Norway	3
3	Lukáš Bauer	Czech Republic	2
3	**Calle Halfvarsson**	Sweden	2
3	**Hans Christer Holund**	Norway	2

Women
Rank	Name	Country	Wins
1	**Therese Johaug**	Norway	12
2	Marit Bjørgen	Norway	9
3	**Maiken Caspersen Falla**	Norway	2
3	Justyna Kowalczyk	Poland	2

== World Cup points ==
The overall winner are awarded 200 points. The winners of each of the three stages are awarded 50 points. The maximum number of points an athlete can earn is therefore 350 points.

Position	1	2	3	4	5	6	7	8	9	10	11	12	13	14	15	16	17	18	19	20	21	22	23	24	25	26	27	28	29	30
Overall	200	160	120	100	90	80	72	64	58	52	48	44	40	36	32	30	28	26	24	22	20	18	16	14	12	10	8	6	4	2
Stage	50	46	43	40	37	34	32	30	28	26	24	22	20	18	16	15	14	13	12	11	10	9	8	7	6	5	4	3	2	1

== Sources ==
- Rules for the FIS Cross-Country World Cup (PDF). International Ski Federation (FIS). 2018.
- Rules for the FIS Cross-Country World Cup (PDF). International Ski Federation (FIS). 2019.
