= 2018 Nordic Opening =

9th edition of the Nordic Opening

2018–19 FIS Cross-Country World Cup

Ski tour details
- Venue(s): Lillehammer, Norway
- Dates: 30 November–2 December
- Stages: 3: Sprint F 10/15 km F 10/15 km C Pursuit

Results
Men
	Winner	Didrik Tønseth (NOR)
	Second	Sjur Røthe (NOR)
	Third	Emil Iversen (NOR)
Women
	Winner	Therese Johaug (NOR)
	Second	Ebba Andersson (SWE)
	Third	Ingvild Flugstad Østberg (NOR)

The 2018 Nordic Opening, or the third Lillehammer Triple, was the 9th edition of the Nordic Opening, an annual cross-country skiing mini-tour event. The three-day event was the second competition round of the 2018–19 FIS Cross-Country World Cup.

== Overall leadership ==
Bonus seconds for the top 30 positions by type
Type		1	2	3	4	5	6	7	8	9	10	11	12	13–15	16–20	21–25	26–30
Finish	Sprint	30	27	24	23	22	21	16	15	14	13	12	11	5	4	3	2
Finish	Interval start	none															
Finish	Pursuit	none															

The results in the overall standings were calculated by adding each skier's finishing times on each stage. On the sprint stage, the winners were awarded 30 bonus seconds, no bonus seconds were awarded on stages two and three. The skier with the lowest cumulative time would be the overall winner of the Nordic Opening.

A total of CHF 240,000, both genders included, was awarded in cash prizes in the race. The overall winners of the Nordic Opening received CHF 22,500, with the second and third placed skiers getting CHF 17,500 and CHF 11,000 respectively. All finishers in the top 20 were awarded money. CHF 5,000 was given to the winners of each stage of the race, with smaller amounts given to places second and third.

Overall leadership by stage
Stage	Men		Women	
Stage	Winner	Overall standings	Winner	Overall standings
1	Federico Pellegrino	Federico Pellegrino	Jonna Sundling	Stina Nilsson
2	Sjur Røthe	Sjur Røthe	Therese Johaug	Charlotte Kalla
3	Janosch Brugger	Didrik Tønseth	Therese Johaug	Therese Johaug
Final		Didrik Tønseth	Final	Therese Johaug

== Overall standings ==
Men's Overall standings (1–10)
Rank	Name	Time
1	Didrik Tønseth (NOR)	1:24:03.9
2	Sjur Røthe (NOR)	+1.6
3	Emil Iversen (NOR)	+1:03.3
4	Calle Halfvarsson (SWE)	+1:04.4
5	Alexander Bolshunov (RUS)	+1:04.5
6	Andrey Larkov (RUS)	+1:05.0
7	Iivo Niskanen (FIN)	+1:05.2
8	Simen Hegstad Krüger (NOR)	+1:05.3
9	Viktor Thorn (SWE)	+1:05.5
10	Dario Cologna (SUI)	+1:05.8

Women's Overall standings (1–10)
Rank	Name	Time
1	Therese Johaug (NOR)	58:58.9
2	Ebba Andersson (SWE)	+16.8
3	Ingvild Flugstad Østberg (NOR)	+17.9
4	Charlotte Kalla (SWE)	+23.1
5	Krista Pärmäkoski (FIN)	+1:04.2
6	Stina Nilsson (SWE)	+1:35.4
7	Teresa Stadlober (AUT)	+1:44.8
8	Natalya Nepryayeva (RUS)	+2:05.3
9	Ragnhild Haga (NOR)	+2:13.2
10	Sadie Bjornsen (USA)	+2:21.7

== Stages ==
=== Stage 1 ===
30 November 2018

- The skiers qualification times count in the overall standings. Bonus seconds are awarded to the 30 skiers that qualifies for the quarter-finals, distributed as following:
  - Final: 30–27–24–23–22–21
  - Semi-final: 16–15–14–13–12–11
  - Quarter-final: 5–5–5–4–4–4–4–4–3–3–3–3–3–2–2–2–2–2

Men – 1.6 km Sprint Freestyle (individual)
Rank	Name	QT	Time	BS
1	Federico Pellegrino (ITA)	3:10.03 (3)	3:19.14	30
2	Emil Iversen (NOR)	3:09.19 (2)	+0.47	27
3	Alex Harvey (CAN)	3:15.22 (17)	+0.71	24
4	Sindre Bjørnestad Skar (NOR)	3:12.41 (6)	+0.94	23
5	Finn Hågen Krogh (NOR)	3:11.26 (4)	+1.09	22
6	Ristomatti Hakola (FIN)	3:14.42 (11)	+2.46	21
7	Eirik Brandsdal (NOR)	3:13.64 (10)	SF	16
8	Gleb Retivykh (RUS)	3:13.28 (9)	SF	15
9	Calle Halfvarsson (SWE)	3:13.20 (7)	SF	14
10	Joni Mäki (FIN)	3:15.35 (19)	SF	13

Women – 1.3 km Sprint Freestyle (individual)
Rank	Name	QT	Time	BS
1	Jonna Sundling (SWE)	3:02.17 (26)	2:52.74	30
2	Stina Nilsson (SWE)	2:57.68 (3)	+0.34	27
3	Sadie Bjornsen (USA)	2:58.31 (6)	+3.03	24
4	Evelina Settlin (SWE)	3:00.11 (13)	+3.82	23
5	Kristine Stavås Skistad (NOR)	2:58.31 (7)	+6.65	22
6	Hanna Falk (SWE)	2:56.43 (1)	+9.81	21
7	Ida Ingemarsdotter (SWE)	3:02.47 (29)	SF	16
8	Natalya Matveyeva (RUS)	3:00.81 (18)	SF	15
9	Ragnhild Haga (NOR)	2:57.17 (2)	SF	14
10	Charlotte Kalla (SWE)	2:58.30 (5)	SF	13

=== Stage 2 ===
1 December 2018

- No bonus seconds were awarded on this stage.

Men – 15 km Freestyle (individual)
Rank	Name	Time
1	Sjur Røthe (NOR)	36:34.0
2	Didrik Tønseth (NOR)	+6.0
3	Denis Spitsov (RUS)	+28.6
4	Dario Cologna (SUI)	+38.3
5	Andrey Melnichenko (RUS)	+40.6
6	Andrew Musgrave (GBR)	+45.1
7	Emil Iversen (NOR)	+45.5
8	Simen Hegstad Krüger (NOR)	+47.0
9	Hans Christer Holund (NOR)	+48.7
10	Martin Johnsrud Sundby (NOR)	+49.2

Women – 10 km Freestyle (individual)
Rank	Name	Time
1	Therese Johaug (NOR)	26:22.4
2	Ebba Andersson (SWE)	+9.2
3	Charlotte Kalla (SWE)	+15.7
4	Ingvild Flugstad Østberg (NOR)	+34.8
5	Krista Pärmäkoski (FIN)	+43.5
6	Ragnhild Haga (NOR)	+55.9
7	Teresa Stadlober (AUT)	+1:01.9
8	Heidi Weng (NOR)	+1:08.1
9	Sadie Bjornsen (USA)	+1:17.0
10	Ida Ingemarsdotter (SWE)	+1:22.0

=== Stage 3 ===
2 December 2018

- The race for "Winner of the Day" counts for 2018–19 FIS Cross-Country World Cup points. No bonus seconds were awarded on this stage.

Men – 15 km Classic (pursuit)
Rank	Name	Time
1	Janosch Brugger (GER)	42:51.0
2	Jean-Marc Gaillard (FRA)	+16.1
3	Erik Bjornsen (USA)	+17.9
4	Ristomatti Hakola (FIN)	+21.6
5	Jens Burman (SWE)	+22.9
6	Jonas Dobler (GER)	+30.1
7	Alexey Poltoranin (KAZ)	+33.4
8	Lucas Bögl (GER)	+38.1
9	Jonas Baumann (SUI)	+38.3
10	Maxim Vylegzhanin (RUS)	+39.4

Women – 10 km Classic (pursuit)
Rank	Name	Time
1	Therese Johaug (NOR)	29:33.0
2	Ingvild Flugstad Østberg (NOR)	+0.6
3	Ebba Andersson (SWE)	+5.0
4	Charlotte Kalla (SWE)	+25.6
5	Krista Pärmäkoski (FIN)	+27.4
6	Stina Nilsson (SWE)	+32.3
7	Natalya Nepryayeva (RUS)	+33.4
8	Teresa Stadlober (AUT)	+42.4
9	Yuliya Belorukova (RUS)	+1:08.1
10	Jonna Sundling (SWE)	+1:12.4

== World Cup points distribution ==
The overall winners were awarded 200 points. The winners of each of the three stages are awarded 50 points. The maximum number of points an athlete can earn is therefore 350 points.

Position	1	2	3	4	5	6	7	8	9	10	11	12	13	14	15	16	17	18	19	20	21	22	23	24	25	26	27	28	29	30
Overall	200	160	120	100	90	80	72	64	58	52	48	44	40	36	32	30	28	26	24	22	20	18	16	14	12	10	8	6	4	2
Stage	50	46	43	40	37	34	32	30	28	26	24	22	20	18	16	15	14	13	12	11	10	9	8	7	6	5	4	3	2	1

== Sources ==
- Rules for the FIS Cross-Country World Cup (PDF). International Ski Federation (FIS). 2018.
