= 2014 Nordic Opening =

5th edition of the Nordic Opening

2014–15 FIS Cross-Country World Cup

Ski tour details
- Venue(s): Lillehammer, Norway
- Dates: 5–7 December
- Stages: 3: Sprint F 5/10 km F 10/15 km C Pursuit

Results
Men
	Winner	Martin Johnsrud Sundby (NOR)
	Second	Finn Hågen Krogh (NOR)
	Third	Sjur Røthe (NOR)
Women
	Winner	Marit Bjørgen (NOR)
	Second	Therese Johaug (NOR)
	Third	Heidi Weng (NOR)

The 2014 Nordic Opening or the first Lillehammer Triple was the 5th edition of the Nordic Opening, an annual cross-country skiing mini-tour event. The three-day event was the second competition round of the 2014–15 FIS Cross-Country World Cup.

== World Cup points distribution ==
The winners of the overall standings were awarded 200 World Cup points and the winners of each of the three stages were awarded 50 World Cup points.

Nordic Opening Overall
Position	1	2	3	4	5	6	7	8	9	10	11	12	13	14	15	16	17	18	19	20	21	22	23	24	25	26	27	28	29	30
Points	200	160	120	100	90	80	72	64	58	52	48	44	40	36	32	30	28	26	24	22	20	18	16	14	12	10	8	6	4	2

Nordic Overall Stage
Position	1	2	3	4	5	6	7	8	9	10	11	12	13	14	15	16	17	18	19	20	21	22	23	24	25	26	27	28	29	30
Points	50	46	43	40	37	34	32	30	28	26	24	22	20	18	16	15	14	13	12	11	10	9	8	7	6	5	4	3	2	1

A total of 350 points was possible to achieve if one athlete won all three stages and the overall standings.

== Overall standings ==
Men's Overall standings (1–10)
Rank	Name	Time
1	Martin Johnsrud Sundby (NOR)	1:05:38.5
2	Finn Hågen Krogh (NOR)	+16.6
3	Sjur Røthe (NOR)	+36.5
4	Pål Golberg (NOR)	+37.5
5	Didrik Tønseth (NOR)	+43.7
6	Calle Halfvarsson (SWE)	+48.5
7	Matti Heikkinen (FIN)	+50.9
8	Dario Cologna (SUI)	+51.2
9	Niklas Dyrhaug (NOR)	+51.9
10	Alex Harvey (CAN)	+52.5

Women's Overall standings (1–10)
Rank	Name	Time
1	Therese Johaug (NOR)	43:21.2
2	Therese Johaug (NOR)	+0.6
3	Heidi Weng (NOR)	+12.3
4	Ingvild Flugstad Østberg (NOR)	+1:38.3
5	Charlotte Kalla (SWE)	+1:50.9
6	Ragnhild Haga (NOR)	+1:55.3
7	Maiken Caspersen Falla (NOR)	+2:00.8
8	Krista Pärmäkoski (FIN)	+2:13.1
9	Kerttu Niskanen (FIN)	+2:13.3
10	Justyna Kowalczyk (POL)	+2:15.6

== Overall leadership by stage ==
Overall leadership by stage
Stage	Men		Women	
Stage	Winner	Overall standings	Winner	Overall standings
1	Pål Golberg	Pål Golberg	Marit Bjørgen	Marit Bjørgen
2	Martin Johnsrud Sundby	Finn Hågen Krogh	Therese Johaug	Marit Bjørgen
3	Didrik Tønseth	Martin Johnsrud Sundby	Therese Johaug	Marit Bjørgen
Final		Martin Johnsrud Sundby	Final	Marit Bjørgen
