= 2017 Nordic Opening =

8th edition of the Nordic Opening

2017–18 FIS Cross-Country World Cup

Ski tour details
- Venue(s): Ruka, Finland
- Dates: 24–26 November
- Stages: 3: Sprint C 10/15 km C 10/15 km F Pursuit

Results
Men
	Winner	Johannes Høsflot Klæbo (NOR)
	Second	Martin Johnsrud Sundby (NOR)
	Third	Alexander Bolshunov (RUS)
Women
	Winner	Charlotte Kalla (SWE)
	Second	Marit Bjørgen (NOR)
	Third	Ragnhild Haga (NOR)

The 2017 Nordic Opening, or the sixth Ruka Triple, was the 8th edition of the Nordic Opening, an annual cross-country skiing mini-tour event. The three-day event was the first competition round of the 2017–18 FIS Cross-Country World Cup.

== World Cup points distribution ==
The winners of the overall standings were awarded 200 World Cup points and the winners of each of the three stages were awarded 50 World Cup points.

Nordic Opening Overall
Position	1	2	3	4	5	6	7	8	9	10	11	12	13	14	15	16	17	18	19	20	21	22	23	24	25	26	27	28	29	30
Points	200	160	120	100	90	80	72	64	58	52	48	44	40	36	32	30	28	26	24	22	20	18	16	14	12	10	8	6	4	2

Nordic Overall Stage
Position	1	2	3	4	5	6	7	8	9	10	11	12	13	14	15	16	17	18	19	20	21	22	23	24	25	26	27	28	29	30
Points	50	46	43	40	37	34	32	30	28	26	24	22	20	18	16	15	14	13	12	11	10	9	8	7	6	5	4	3	2	1

A total of 350 points was possible to achieve if one athlete won all three stages and the overall standings.

== Overall standings ==
Men's Overall standings (1–10)
Rank	Name	Time
1	Johannes Høsflot Klæbo (NOR)	1:12:18.5
2	Martin Johnsrud Sundby (NOR)	+0.4
3	Alexander Bolshunov (RUS)	+1.0
4	Alex Harvey (CAN)	+1.6
5	Alexey Chervotkin (RUS)	+6.2
6	Iivo Niskanen (FIN)	+7.2
7	Didrik Tønseth (NOR)	+8.1
8	Maurice Manificat (FRA)	+8.2
9	Hans Christer Holund (NOR)	+8.2
10	Calle Halfvarsson (SWE)	+10.7

Women's Overall standings (1–10)
Rank	Name	Time
1	Charlotte Kalla (SWE)	54:21.2
2	Marit Bjørgen (NOR)	+9.7
3	Ragnhild Haga (NOR)	+33.9
4	Heidi Weng (NOR)	+38.0
5	Ingvild Flugstad Østberg (NOR)	+40.2
6	Teresa Stadlober (AUT)	+41.0
7	Stina Nilsson (SWE)	+46.7
8	Natalya Nepryayeva (RUS)	+1:01.6
9	Ida Ingemarsdotter (SWE)	+1:10.1
10	Sadie Bjornsen (USA)	+1:18.0

== Overall leadership by stage ==
Overall leadership by stage
Stage	Men		Women	
Stage	Winner	Overall standings	Winner	Overall standings
1	Johannes Høsflot Klæbo	Johannes Høsflot Klæbo	Stina Nilsson	Sadie Bjornsen
2	Johannes Høsflot Klæbo	Johannes Høsflot Klæbo	Marit Bjørgen	Charlotte Kalla
3	Maurice Manificat	Johannes Høsflot Klæbo	Ragnhild Haga	Charlotte Kalla
Final		Johannes Høsflot Klæbo	Final	Charlotte Kalla
