= 2019 Nordic Opening =

10th edition of the Nordic Opening

2019–20 FIS Cross-Country World Cup

Ski tour details
- Venue(s): Ruka, Finland
- Dates: 29 November–1 December
- Stages: 3: Sprint C 10/15 km C 10/15 km F Pursuit

Results
Men
	Winner	Johannes Høsflot Klæbo (NOR)
	Second	Emil Iversen (NOR)
	Third	Iivo Niskanen (FIN)
Women
	Winner	Therese Johaug (NOR)
	Second	Heidi Weng (NOR)
	Third	Astrid Uhrenholdt Jacobsen (NOR)

The 2019 Nordic Opening, or the seventh Ruka Triple, is the 10th edition of the Nordic Opening, an annual cross-country skiing mini-tour event. The three-day event will be the first competition round of the 2019–20 FIS Cross-Country World Cup.

== Overall leadership ==
Bonus seconds for the top 30 positions by type
Type		1	2	3	4	5	6	7	8	9	10	11	12	13–15	16–20	21–25	26–30
Finish	Sprint	30	27	24	23	22	21	16	15	14	13	12	11	5	4	3	2
Finish	Interval start	none															
Finish	Pursuit	none															

The results in the overall standings were calculated by adding each skier's finishing times on each stage. On the sprint stage, the winners were awarded 30 bonus seconds, no bonus seconds were awarded on stages two and three. The skier with the lowest cumulative time would be the overall winner of the Nordic Opening.

A total of CHF 240,000, both genders included, was awarded in cash prizes in the race. The overall winners of the Nordic Opening received CHF 22,500, with the second and third placed skiers getting CHF 17,500 and CHF 11,000 respectively. All finishers in the top 20 were awarded money. CHF 5,000 was given to the winners of each stage of the race, with smaller amounts given to places second and third.

Overall leadership by stage
Stage	Men		Women	
Stage	Winner	Overall standings	Winner	Overall standings
1	Johannes Høsflot Klæbo	Johannes Høsflot Klæbo	Maiken Caspersen Falla	Maiken Caspersen Falla
2	Iivo Niskanen	Johannes Høsflot Klæbo	Therese Johaug	Therese Johaug
3	Hans Christer Holund	Johannes Høsflot Klæbo	Therese Johaug	Therese Johaug
Final		Johannes Høsflot Klæbo	Final	Therese Johaug

== Overall standings ==
Men's Overall standings (1–10)
Rank	Name	Time
1	(Norway) Johannes Høsflot Klæbo	1:13:06.7
2	(Norway) Emil Iversen	+1.8
3	(Finland) Iivo Niskanen	+11.1
4	(Norway) Pål Golberg	+47.9
5	(Russia) Alexander Bolshunov	+48.3
6	(Norway) Hans Christer Holund	+52.1
7	(Norway) Didrik Tønseth	+58.8
8	(Norway) Sjur Røthe	+1:16.4
9	(Sweden) Calle Halfvarsson	+1:33.6
10	(Russia) Sergey Ustiugov	+1:39.0

Women's Overall standings (1–10)
Rank	Name	Time
1	(Norway) Therese Johaug	55:43.0
2	(Norway) Heidi Weng	+1:11.3
3	(Norway) Astrid Uhrenholdt Jacobsen	+1:13.3
4	(United States) Sadie Maubet Bjornsen	+1:27.9
5	(United States) Jessie Diggins	+1:30.9
6	(Finland) Krista Pärmäkoski	+1:41.0
7	(Norway) Tiril Udnes Weng	+1:52.5
8	(Sweden) Frida Karlsson	+1:53.9
9	(Czech Republic) Kateřina Razýmová	+2:00.1
10	(United States) Rosie Brennan	+2:15.3

== Stages ==
=== Stage 1 ===
29 November 2019

- The skiers qualification times count in the overall standings. Bonus seconds are awarded to the 30 skiers that qualifies for the quarter-finals, distributed as following:
  - Final: 30–27–24–23–22–21
  - Semi-final: 16–15–14–13–12–11
  - Quarter-final: 5–5–5–4–4–4–4–4–3–3–3–3–3–2–2–2–2–2

Men – 1.4 km Sprint Classic
Rank	Name	QT	Time	BS
1	(Norway) Johannes Høsflot Klæbo	2:37.42 (1)	2:39.47	30
2	(Norway) Pål Golberg	2:41.31 (4)	+4.17	27
3	(France) Richard Jouve	2:44.62 (15)	+4.62	24
4	(Russia) Alexander Bolshunov	2:43.60 (11)	+5.24	23
5	(Norway) Emil Iversen	2:44.84 (18)	+5.96	22
6	(Sweden) Oskar Svensson	2:46.33 (30)	+9.50	21
7	(Sweden) Johan Häggström	2:42.35 (5)	SF	16
8	(Sweden) Calle Halfvarsson	2:45.35 (22)	SF	15
9	(Sweden) Teodor Peterson	2:45.26 (20)	SF	14
10	(Russia) Ilia Semikov	2:45.63 (24)	SF	13

Women – 1.4 km Sprint Classic
Rank	Name	QT	Time	BS
1	(Norway) Maiken Caspersen Falla	3:05.70 (6)	3:07.09	30
2	(Sweden) Jonna Sundling	3:08.76 (15)	+2.33	27
3	(United States) Sadie Maubet Bjornsen	3:04.16 (2)	+2.77	24
4	(Norway) Ane Appelkvist Stenseth	3:05.67 (5)	+2.78	23
5	(Sweden) Stina Nilsson	3:07.50 (10)	+7.00	22
6	(Norway) Tiril Udnes Weng	3:13.03 (30)	+17.61	21
7	(Russia) Natalya Nepryayeva	3:09.02 (17)	SF	16
8	(Slovenia) Katja Višnar	3:09.43 (18)	SF	15
9	(Slovenia) Anamarija Lampič	3:06.67 (7)	SF	14
10	(Norway) Astrid Uhrenholdt Jacobsen	3:07.47 (9)	SF	13

=== Stage 2 ===
30 November 2019

- No bonus seconds were awarded on this stage.

Men – 15 km Classic (individual)
Rank	Name	Time
1	(Finland) Iivo Niskanen	35:17:0
2	(Norway) Johannes Høsflot Klæbo	+13.0
3	(Norway) Emil Iversen	+14.9
4	(Norway) Didrik Tønseth	+33.1
5	(Russia) Alexander Bolshunov	+43.8
6	(Russia) Andrey Larkov	+45.4
7	(Norway) Pål Golberg	+49.7
8	(Norway) Hans Christer Holund	+55.9
9	(Russia) Sergey Ustiugov	+57.2
10	(Russia) Ivan Yakimushkin	+1.06.2

Women – 10 km Classic (individual)
Rank	Name	Time
1	(Norway) Therese Johaug	26.47.5
2	(Finland) Krista Pärmäkoski	+30.1
3	(Russia) Natalya Nepryayeva	+44.4
4	(United States) Sadie Maubet Bjornsen	+45.7
5	(Czech Republic) Kateřina Razýmová	+46.7
6	(United States) Rosie Brennan	+57.9
7	(Norway) Heidi Weng	+58.0
8	(Norway) Astrid Uhrenholdt Jacobsen	+59.6
9	(Japan) Masako Ishida	+1.04.5
10	(Finland) Kerttu Niskanen	+1.07.2

=== Stage 3 ===
1 December 2019

- The race for "Winner of the Day" counts for 2019–20 FIS Cross-Country World Cup points. No bonus seconds were awarded on this stage.

Men – 15 km Freestyle (pursuit)
Rank	Name	Time
1	(Norway) Hans Christer Holund	34:53.8
2	(Norway) Sjur Røthe	+6.3
3	(Norway) Emil Iversen	+21.7
4	(Finland) Iivo Niskanen	+29.0
5	(Finland) Perttu Hyvärinen	+30.5
6	(Sweden) Jens Burman	+32.5
7	(Norway) Didrik Tønseth	+34.7
8	(Norway) Erik Valnes	+34.9
9	(Norway) Johannes Høsflot Klæbo	+35.9
10	(Norway) Pål Golberg	+40.8

Women – 10 km Freestyle (pursuit)
Rank	Name	Time
1	(Norway) Therese Johaug	25:48:0
2	(Norway) Heidi Weng	+8.3
3	(United States) Jessie Diggins	+20.9
4	(Norway) Astrid Uhrenholdt Jacobsen	+27.3
5	(Sweden) Frida Karlsson	+37.9
6	(Norway) Tiril Udnes Weng	+39.5
7	(Norway) Anne Kjersti Kalvå	+46.3
8	(Germany) Victoria Carl	+54.0
9	(Sweden) Stina Nilsson	+56.5
10	(Sweden) Charlotte Kalla	+1.00.9

== World Cup points distribution ==
The overall winners were awarded 200 points. The winners of each of the three stages are awarded 50 points. The maximum number of points an athlete can earn is therefore 350 points.

Position	1	2	3	4	5	6	7	8	9	10	11	12	13	14	15	16	17	18	19	20	21	22	23	24	25	26	27	28	29	30
Overall	200	160	120	100	90	80	72	64	58	52	48	44	40	36	32	30	28	26	24	22	20	18	16	14	12	10	8	6	4	2
Stage	50	46	43	40	37	34	32	30	28	26	24	22	20	18	16	15	14	13	12	11	10	9	8	7	6	5	4	3	2	1

== Sources ==
- Rules for the FIS Cross-Country World Cup (PDF). International Ski Federation (FIS). 2019.
