= 2015 Nordic Opening =

6th edition of the Nordic Opening

2015–16 FIS Cross-Country World Cup

Ski tour details
- Venue(s): Ruka, Finland
- Dates: 27–29 November
- Stages: 3: Sprint C 5/10 km F 10/15 km C Pursuit

Results
Men
	Winner	Martin Johnsrud Sundby (NOR)
	Second	Petter Northug (NOR)
	Third	Finn Hågen Krogh (NOR)
Women
	Winner	Therese Johaug (NOR)
	Second	Stina Nilsson (SWE)
	Third	Ingvild Flugstad Østberg (NOR)

The 2015 Nordic Opening or the fifth Ruka Triple was the 6th edition of the Nordic Opening, an annual cross-country skiing mini-tour event. The three-day event was the first competition round of the 2015–16 FIS Cross-Country World Cup.

== World Cup points distribution ==
The winners of the overall standings were awarded 200 World Cup points and the winners of each of the three stages were awarded 50 World Cup points.

Nordic Opening Overall
Position	1	2	3	4	5	6	7	8	9	10	11	12	13	14	15	16	17	18	19	20	21	22	23	24	25	26	27	28	29	30
Points	200	160	120	100	90	80	72	64	58	52	48	44	40	36	32	30	28	26	24	22	20	18	16	14	12	10	8	6	4	2

Nordic Overall Stage
Position	1	2	3	4	5	6	7	8	9	10	11	12	13	14	15	16	17	18	19	20	21	22	23	24	25	26	27	28	29	30
Points	50	46	43	40	37	34	32	30	28	26	24	22	20	18	16	15	14	13	12	11	10	9	8	7	6	5	4	3	2	1

A total of 350 points was possible to achieve if one athlete won all three stages and the overall standings.

== Overall standings ==
Men's Overall standings (1–10)
Rank	Name	Time
1	Martin Johnsrud Sundby (NOR)	1:00:45.3
2	Petter Northug (NOR)	+44.7
3	Finn Hågen Krogh (NOR)	+46.5
4	Francesco De Fabiani (ITA)	+46.6
5	Niklas Dyrhaug (NOR)	+48.5
6	Didrik Tønseth (NOR)	+50.6
7	Alex Harvey (CAN)	+55.5
8	Alexander Legkov (RUS)	+56.0
9	Hans Christer Holund (NOR)	+56.2
10	Sjur Røthe (NOR)	+57.3

Women's Overall standings (1–10)
Rank	Name	Time
1	Therese Johaug (NOR)	41:49.6
2	Stina Nilsson (SWE)	+22.6
3	Ingvild Flugstad Østberg (NOR)	+32.4
4	Ida Ingemarsdotter (SWE)	+42.5
5	Kerttu Niskanen (FIN)	+57.0
6	Charlotte Kalla (SWE)	+1:09.7
7	Astrid Uhrenholdt Jacobsen (NOR)	+1:11.6
8	Krista Pärmäkoski (FIN)	+1:24.3
9	Heidi Weng (NOR)	+1:27.3
10	Maiken Caspersen Falla (NOR)	+1:42.3

== Overall leadership by stage ==
Overall leadership by stage
Stage	Men		Women	
Stage	Winner	Overall standings	Winner	Overall standings
1	Sondre Turvoll Fossli	Sondre Turvoll Fossli	Maiken Caspersen Falla	Maiken Caspersen Falla
2	Martin Johnsrud Sundby	Martin Johnsrud Sundby	Therese Johaug	Therese Johaug
3	Niklas Dyrhaug	Martin Johnsrud Sundby	Therese Johaug	Therese Johaug
Final		Martin Johnsrud Sundby	Final	Therese Johaug
