= 2016 Nordic Opening =

7th edition of the Nordic Opening

2016–17 FIS Cross-Country World Cup

Ski tour details
- Venue(s): Lillehammer, Norway
- Dates: 2–4 December
- Stages: 3: Sprint C 5/10 km F 10/15 km C Pursuit

Results
Men
	Winner	Martin Johnsrud Sundby (NOR)
	Second	Johannes Høsflot Klæbo (NOR)
	Third	Matti Heikkinen (FIN)
Women
	Winner	Heidi Weng (NOR)
	Second	Ingvild Flugstad Østberg (NOR)
	Third	Krista Pärmäkoski (FIN)

The 2016 Nordic Opening or the second Lillehammer Triple was the 7th edition of the Nordic Opening, an annual cross-country skiing mini-tour event. The three-day event was the second competition round of the 2016–17 FIS Cross-Country World Cup.

== World Cup points distribution ==
The winners of the overall standings were awarded 200 World Cup points and the winners of each of the three stages were awarded 50 World Cup points.

Nordic Opening Overall
Position	1	2	3	4	5	6	7	8	9	10	11	12	13	14	15	16	17	18	19	20	21	22	23	24	25	26	27	28	29	30
Points	200	160	120	100	90	80	72	64	58	52	48	44	40	36	32	30	28	26	24	22	20	18	16	14	12	10	8	6	4	2

Nordic Overall Stage
Position	1	2	3	4	5	6	7	8	9	10	11	12	13	14	15	16	17	18	19	20	21	22	23	24	25	26	27	28	29	30
Points	50	46	43	40	37	34	32	30	28	26	24	22	20	18	16	15	14	13	12	11	10	9	8	7	6	5	4	3	2	1

A total of 350 points was possible to achieve if one athlete won all three stages and the overall standings.

== Overall standings ==
Men's Overall standings (1–10)
Rank	Name	Time
1	Martin Johnsrud Sundby (NOR)	1:05:40.1
2	Johannes Høsflot Klæbo (NOR)	+2.3
3	Matti Heikkinen (FIN)	+2.7
4	Emil Iversen (NOR)	+3.6
5	Calle Halfvarsson (SWE)	+6.3
6	Marcus Hellner (SWE)	+6.8
7	Pål Golberg (NOR)	+9.9
8	Finn Hågen Krogh (NOR)	+15.0
9	Alex Harvey (CAN)	+16.2
10	Iivo Niskanen (FIN)	+52.0

Women's Overall standings (1–10)
Rank	Name	Time
1	Heidi Weng (NOR)	44:21.1
2	Ingvild Flugstad Østberg (NOR)	+16.1
3	Krista Pärmäkoski (FIN)	+21.0
4	Marit Bjørgen (NOR)	+57.5
5	Stina Nilsson (SWE)	+1:26.1
6	Yuliya Chekalyova (RUS)	+1:31.0
7	Maiken Caspersen Falla (NOR)	+1:33.4
8	Jessie Diggins (USA)	+1:39.4
9	Laura Mononen (FIN)	+1:43.3
10	Ragnhild Haga (NOR)	+1:50.7

== Overall leadership by stage ==
Overall leadership by stage
Stage	Men		Women	
Stage	Winner	Overall standings	Winner	Overall standings
1	Calle Halfvarsson	Calle Halfvarsson	Heidi Weng	Heidi Weng
2	Calle Halfvarsson	Calle Halfvarsson	Jessie Diggins	Heidi Weng
3	Matti Heikkinen	Martin Johnsrud Sundby	Krista Pärmäkoski	Heidi Weng
Final		Martin Johnsrud Sundby	Final	Heidi Weng
