= Jason Rüesch =

Swiss cross-country skier

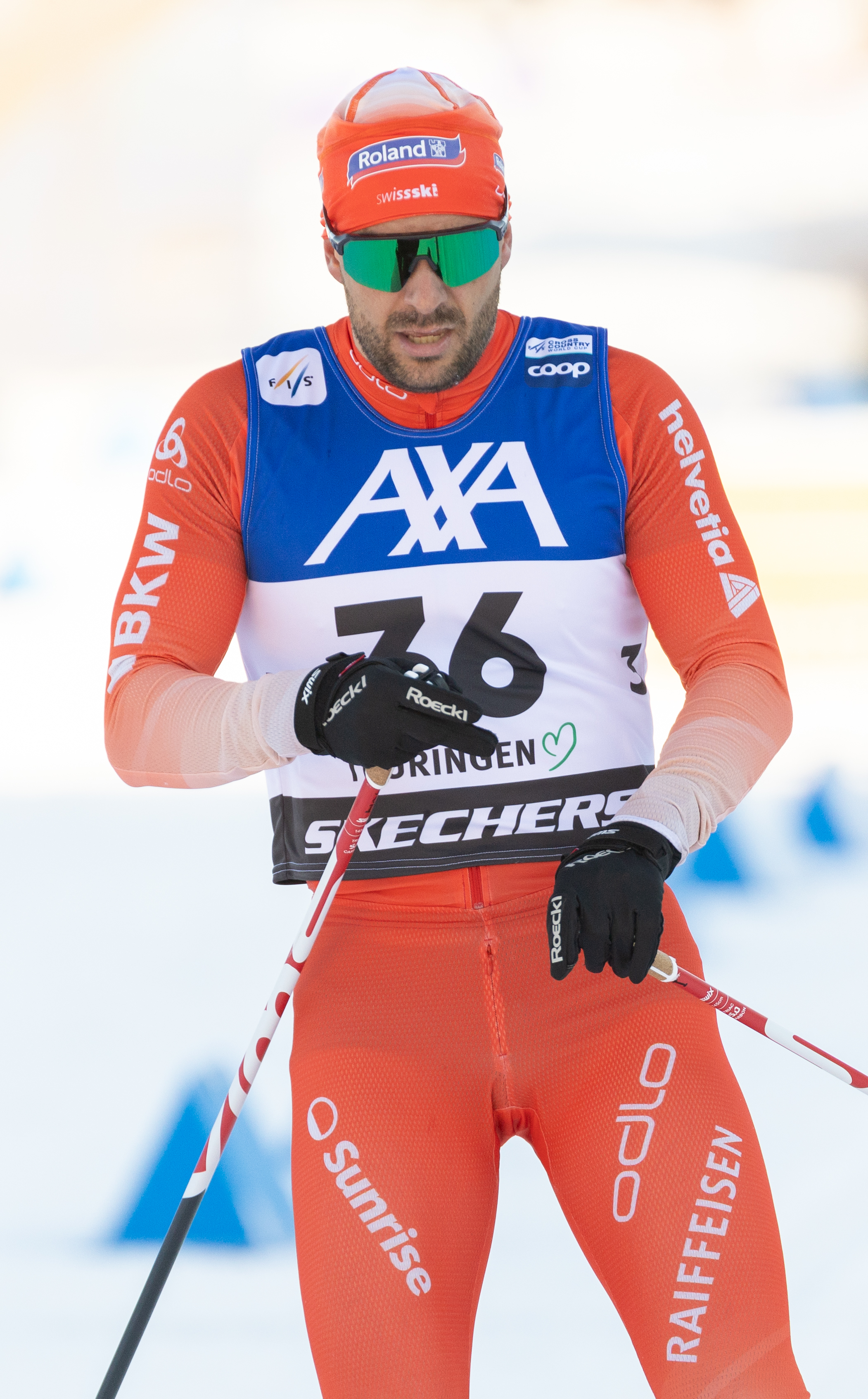

Personal information
- Nationality: Switzerland
- Born: 16 May 1994 (age 32) Davos, Switzerland
- Height: 1.76 m (5 ft 9 in)

Sport
- Sport: Skiing
- Club: SC Davos

World Cup career
- Seasons: 9 – (2015–present)
- Indiv. starts: 67
- Indiv. podiums: 0
- Team starts: 4
- Team podiums: 1
- Team wins: 0
- Overall titles: 0 – (67th in 2021)
- Discipline titles: 0
Medal record
World Championships
Silver medal – second place	2025 Trondheim	4 × 7.5 km relay
- Updated on 29 March 2023

Jason Rüesch (born 16 May 1994) is a Swiss cross-country skier. He competed in 30 kilometre skiathlon at the 2022 Winter Olympics. He also had planned to compete at the 2018 Winter Olympics, but was forced to pull out due to health issues.

== Cross-country skiing results ==
All results are sourced from the International Ski Federation (FIS).

=== Olympic Games ===
Year	Age	15 km individual	30 km skiathlon	50 km mass start	Sprint	4 × 10 km relay	Team sprint
2022	27	53	27	17^{[a]}	—	—	—

^{a} Distance reduced to 30 km due to weather conditions.

=== World Championships ===
Year	Age	15 km individual	30 km skiathlon	50 km mass start	Sprint	4 × 10 km relay	Team sprint
2017	22	—	24	—	—	5	—
2019	24	—	—	—	47	—	—
2021	26	20	15	11	—	5	—

=== World Cup ===
==== Season standings ====
Season	Age	Discipline standings				Ski Tour standings				
Season	Age	Overall	Distance	Sprint	U23	Nordic Opening	Tour de Ski	Ski Tour 2020	World Cup Final	Ski Tour Canada
2015	20	NC	NC	NC	NC	—	—	—N/a	—N/a	—N/a
2016	21	NC	NC	—	NC	—	—	—N/a	—N/a	—
2017	22	119	78	NC	13	—	DNF	—N/a	—	—N/a
2018	23	153	101	—	—N/a	—	—	—N/a	—	—N/a
2019	24	117	95	77	—N/a	—	DNF	—N/a	—	—N/a
2020	25	81	54	NC	—N/a	52	40	33	—N/a	—N/a
2021	26	67	43	NC	—N/a	35	DNF	—N/a	—N/a	—N/a
2022	27	141	86	—	—N/a	—N/a	—	—N/a	—N/a	—N/a
2023	28	NC	NC	NC	—N/a	—N/a	DNF	—N/a	—N/a	—N/a

==== Team podiums ====
- 1 podium – (1 RL)

No.	Season	Date	Location	Race	Level	Place	Teammates
1	2019–20	1 March 2020	Lahti, Finland	4 × 7.5 km Relay C/F	World Cup	2nd	Klee / Cologna / Furger
