= 2020 Nordic Opening =

11th edition of the Nordic Opening

2020–21 FIS Cross-Country World Cup

Ski tour details
- Venue(s): Ruka, Finland
- Dates: 27 November–29 November
- Stages: 3: Sprint C 10/15 km C 10/15 km F Pursuit

Results
Men
	Winner	Johannes Høsflot Klæbo (NOR)
	Second	Alexander Bolshunov (RUS)
	Third	Emil Iversen (NOR)
Women
	Winner	Therese Johaug (NOR)
	Second	Tatiana Sorina (RUS)
	Third	Ebba Andersson (SWE)

The 2020 Nordic Opening, or the eighth Ruka Triple, was the 11th edition of the Nordic Opening, an annual cross-country skiing mini-tour event. The three-day event was the first competition round of the 2020–21 FIS Cross-Country World Cup.

== Schedule ==
Stage	Venue	Date	Event	Technique	Distance		Start time (CET)	
Stage	Venue	Date	Event	Technique	Women	Men	Women	Men
1	Ruka (FIN)	27 November 2020	Sprint	Classic	1.4 km	1.4 km	12:30	12:30
2	Ruka (FIN)	28 November 2020	Distance, interval start	Classic	10 km	15 km	09:40	12:45
3	Ruka (FIN)	29 November 2020	Distance, pursuit	Freestyle	10 km	15 km	11:50	12:50

== Overall leadership ==
Bonus seconds for the top 30 positions by type
Type		1	2	3	4	5	6	7	8	9	10	11	12	13–15	16–20	21–25	26–30
Finish	Sprint	30	27	24	23	22	21	16	15	14	13	12	11	5	4	3	2
Finish	Interval start	none															
Finish	Pursuit	none															

The results in the overall standings were calculated by adding each skier's finishing times on each stage. On the sprint stage, the winners earned 30 bonus seconds, no bonus seconds were given on stages two and three. The skier with the lowest cumulative time became the overall winner of the Nordic Opening.

A total of CHF 252,000, both genders included, were awarded in cash prizes in the tournament. The overall winners of the Nordic Opening received CHF 25,000, with the second and third placed skiers getting CHF 18,000 and CHF 12,000 respectively. All finishers in the top 20 were awarded money. CHF 5,000 were given to the winners of each stage of the race, with smaller amounts given to places second and third.

Overall leadership by stage
Stage	Men		Women	
Stage	Winner	Overall standings	Winner	Overall standings
1	Erik Valnes	Erik Valnes	Linn Svahn	Linn Svahn
2	Johannes Høsflot Klæbo	Johannes Høsflot Klæbo	Therese Johaug	Therese Johaug
3	Hans Christer Holund	Johannes Høsflot Klæbo	Therese Johaug	Therese Johaug
Final		Johannes Høsflot Klæbo	Final	Therese Johaug

== Overall standings ==
Men's Overall standings (1–10)
Rank	Name	Time
1	(Norway) Johannes Høsflot Klæbo	1:11:19.8
2	(Russia) Alexander Bolshunov	+0.7
3	(Norway) Emil Iversen	+3.0
4	(Norway) Hans Christer Holund	+19.5
5	(Finland) Iivo Niskanen	+27.3
6	(United Kingdom) Andrew Musgrave	+27.9
7	(Russia) Aleksey Chervotkin	+32.9
8	(Russia) Evgeniy Belov	+33.4
9	(Russia) Andrey Melnichenko	+35.9
10	(Finland) Ristomatti Hakola	+37.1

Women's Overall standings (1–10)
Rank	Name	Time
1	(Norway) Therese Johaug	53:12.2
2	(Russia) Tatiana Sorina	+47.0
3	(Sweden) Ebba Andersson	+48.6
4	(Sweden) Frida Karlsson	+50.8
5	(United States) Rosie Brennan	+52.5
6	(Norway) Helene Marie Fossesholm	+54.8
7	(Sweden) Linn Svahn	+1:06.9
8	(Sweden) Maja Dahlqvist	+1:08.8
9	(Finland) Kerttu Niskanen	+1:14.5
10	(Russia) Natalya Nepryayeva	+1:15.6

== Stages ==
=== Stage 1 ===
27 November 2020

- The skiers qualification times counted in the overall standings. Bonus seconds werere awarded to the 30 skiers that qualifies for the quarter-finals, distributed as following:
  - Final: 30–27–24–23–22–21
  - Semi-final: 16–15–14–13–12–11
  - Quarter-final: 5–5–5–4–4–4–4–4–3–3–3–3–3–2–2–2–2–2

Men – 1.4 km Sprint Classic
Rank	Name	QT	Time	BS
1	(Norway) Erik Valnes	2:34.94 (2)	2:29.56	30
2	(Norway) Johannes Høsflot Klæbo	2:33.32 (1)	+0.61	27
3	(Norway) Emil Iversen	2:41.23 (10)	+4.09	24
4	(Russia) Alexander Bolshunov	2:37.49 (5)	+6.34	23
5	(Norway) Håvard Solås Taugbøl	2:37.09 (4)	+15.50	22
6	(Switzerland) Jovian Hediger	2:41.29 (11)	+19.61	21
7	(Russia) Gleb Retivykh	2:40.81 (8)	SF	16
8	(Finland) Ristomatti Hakola	2:43.00 (22)	SF	15
9	(Norway) Sindre Bjørnestad Skar	2:41.43 (12)	SF	14
10	(Sweden) Johan Häggström	2:41.93 (16)	SF	13

Women – 1.4 km Sprint Classic
Rank	Name	QT	Time	BS
1	(Sweden) Linn Svahn	3:01.54 (3)	2:54.34	30
2	(Sweden) Maja Dahlqvist	3:00.04 (2)	+0.57	27
3	(Sweden) Jonna Sundling	3:02.47 (6)	+0.70	24
4	(Norway) Lotta Udnes Weng	3:05.13 (18)	+2.59	23
5	(Norway) Ane Appelkvist Stenseth	2:55.94 (1)	+3.86	22
6	(Sweden) Emma Ribom	3:04.05 (11)	+5.60	21
7	(Slovenia) Anamarija Lampič	3:03.51 (9)	SF	16
8	(Sweden) Moa Lundgren	3:04.16 (14)	SF	15
9	(Russia) Natalya Nepryayeva	3:05.79 (20)	SF	14
10	(Switzerland) Nadine Fähndrich	3:05.92 (22)	SF	13

=== Stage 2 ===
28 November 2020

- No bonus seconds were awarded on this stage.

Men – 15 km Classic (individual)
Rank	Name	Time
1	(Norway) Johannes Høsflot Klæbo	34:04.6
2	(Russia) Aleksey Chervotkin	+15.2
3	(Russia) Alexander Bolshunov	+18.0
4	(Norway) Emil Iversen	+19.8
5	(Finland) Iivo Niskanen	+21.7
6	(United Kingdom) Andrew Musgrave	+32.8
7	(Russia) Ilia Semikov	+33.2
8	(Russia) Evgeniy Belov	+37.7
9	(Russia) Ilia Poroshkin	+42.3
10	(Norway) Hans Christer Holund	+47.2

Women – 10 km Classic (individual)
Rank	Name	Time
1	(Norway) Therese Johaug	25:01.4
2	(Sweden) Frida Karlsson	+21.8
3	(Sweden) Ebba Andersson	+26.0
4	(Russia) Tatiana Sorina	+26.1
5	(Russia) Natalya Nepryayeva	+30.3
6	(Finland) Kerttu Niskanen	+44.9
7	(Norway) Tiril Udnes Weng	+45.5
8	(United States) Rosie Brennan	+46.6
9	(Norway) Helene Marie Fossesholm	+50.2
10	(Sweden) Maja Dahlqvist	+52.5

=== Stage 3 ===
29 November 2020

- The race for "Winner of the Day" counts for 2020–21 FIS Cross-Country World Cup points. No bonus seconds were awarded on this stage.

Men – 15 km Freestyle (pursuit)
Rank	Name	Time
1	(Norway) Hans Christer Holund	33:57.3
2	(Russia) Andrey Melnichenko	+2.4
3	(Norway) Sjur Røthe	+12.6
4	(Norway) Simen Hegstad Krüger	+15.6
5	(United Kingdom) Andrew Young	+20.4
6	(Germany) Florian Notz	+23.3
7	(Finland) Joni Mäki	+25.7
8	(Russia) Ivan Yakimushkin	+25.8
9	(United Kingdom) Andrew Musgrave	+33.2
10	(Norway) Sindre Bjørnestad Skar	+33.9

Women – 10 km Freestyle (pursuit)
Rank	Name	Time
1	(Norway) Therese Johaug	25:06.2
2	(Norway) Helene Marie Fossesholm	+0.8
3	(United States) Rosie Brennan	+10.5
4	(Sweden) Ebba Andersson	+18.6
5	(United States) Jessie Diggins	+24.4
6	(Sweden) Jonna Sundling	+26.9
7	(Russia) Tatiana Sorina	+28.0
8	(Austria) Teresa Stadlober	+29.6
9	(Finland) Kerttu Niskanen	+32.5
10	(Sweden) Frida Karlsson	+34.8

== World Cup points distribution ==
The overall winners were awarded 200 points. The winners of each of the three stages were awarded 50 points. The maximum number of points an athlete could earn was therefore 350 points.

Position	1	2	3	4	5	6	7	8	9	10	11	12	13	14	15	16	17	18	19	20	21	22	23	24	25	26	27	28	29	30
Overall	200	160	120	100	90	80	72	64	58	52	48	44	40	36	32	30	28	26	24	22	20	18	16	14	12	10	8	6	4	2
Stage	50	46	43	40	37	34	32	30	28	26	24	22	20	18	16	15	14	13	12	11	10	9	8	7	6	5	4	3	2	1

== Sources ==
- "RULES FOR THE FIS CROSS-COUNTRY WORLD CUP 2020/2021" (PDF). International Ski Federation.
