= 2012 Nordic Opening =

3rd edition of the Nordic Opening

2012–13 FIS Cross-Country World Cup

Ski tour details
- Venue(s): Ruka, Finland
- Dates: 30 November–2 December
- Stages: 3: Sprint C 5/10 km F 10/15 km C Pursuit

Results
Men
	Winner	Petter Northug (NOR)
	Second	Maxim Vylegzhanin (RUS)
	Third	Alexey Poltoranin (KAZ)
Women
	Winner	Marit Bjørgen (NOR)
	Second	Justyna Kowalczyk (POL)
	Third	Heidi Weng (NOR)

The 2012 Nordic Opening was the 3rd edition of the annual cross-country skiing event. The three-day event was the second competition round of the 2012–13 FIS Cross-Country World Cup, after Gällivare, Sweden.

== World Cup points distribution ==
The winners of the overall standings were awarded 200 World Cup points and the winners of each of the three stages were awarded 50 World Cup points.

Nordic Opening Overall
Position	1	2	3	4	5	6	7	8	9	10	11	12	13	14	15	16	17	18	19	20	21	22	23	24	25	26	27	28	29	30
Points	200	160	120	100	90	80	72	64	58	52	48	44	40	36	32	30	28	26	24	22	20	18	16	14	12	10	8	6	4	2

Nordic Overall Stage
Position	1	2	3	4	5	6	7	8	9	10	11	12	13	14	15	16	17	18	19	20	21	22	23	24	25	26	27	28	29	30
Points	50	46	43	40	37	34	32	30	28	26	24	22	20	18	16	15	14	13	12	11	10	9	8	7	6	5	4	3	2	1

A total of 350 points was possible to achieve if one athlete won all three stages and the overall standings.

== Overall standings ==
Men's Overall standings
Rank	Name	Time
1	(Norway) Petter Northug	1h 05' 27,3"
2	(Russia) Maxim Vylegzhanin	+ 1,4"
3	(Kazakhstan) Alexey Poltoranin	+ 3,4"
4	(Switzerland) Dario Cologna	+ 7,8"
5	(Russia) Ilia Chernousov	+ 21,1"
6	(Norway) Martin Johnsrud Sundby	+ 22,4"
7	(Russia) Alexander Legkov	+ 24,5"
8	(Russia) Dmitriy Yaparov	+ 24,6"
9	(Sweden) Emil Jönsson	+ 30,0"
10	(Russia) Evgeniy Belov	+ 31,3"

Women's Overall standings
Rank	Name	Time
1	(Norway) Marit Bjørgen	45' 35,1"
2	(Poland) Justyna Kowalczyk	+ 1' 21,4"
3	(Norway) Heidi Weng	+ 1' 23,9"
4	(Norway) Therese Johaug	+ 1' 34,1"
5	(United States) Kikkan Randall	+ 2' 24,8"
6	(Finland) Krista Lähteenmäki	+ 2' 33,1"
7	(Norway) Vibeke Skofterud	+ 2' 36,5"
8	(Norway) Kristin Størmer Steira	+ 2' 38,6"
9	(Japan) Masako Ishida	+ 2' 46,2"
10	(Germany) Nicole Fessel	+ 2' 53,3"

== Overall leadership by stage ==
=== Men ===
Stage	Venue	Discipline	Date	Winner	Second	Third	Overall Leader
Nordic Opening (30 November 2012 – 2 December 2012)
1	(Finland) Ruka	Sprint C	30 November 2012	(Russia) Nikita Kryukov	(Norway) Petter Northug	(Norway) Eirik Brandsdal	(Russia) Nikita Kryukov
2	(Finland) Ruka	10 km F	1 December 2012	(Russia) Alexander Legkov	(Norway) Petter Northug	(France) Maurice Manificat	(Norway) Petter Northug
3	(Finland) Ruka	15 km C Pursuit	2 December 2012	(Russia) Maxim Vylegzhanin	(Switzerland) Dario Cologna	(Norway) Martin Johnsrud Sundby	(Norway) Petter Northug

=== Women ===
Stage	Venue	Discipline	Date	Winner	Second	Third	Overall Leader
Nordic Opening (30 November 2012 – 2 December 2012)
1	(Finland) Ruka	Sprint C	30 November 2012	(Norway) Marit Bjørgen	(Russia) Yevgeniya Shapovalova	(Russia) Anastasia Dotsenko	(Norway) Marit Bjørgen
2	(Finland) Ruka	5 km F	1 December 2012	(Norway) Marit Bjørgen	(United States) Kikkan Randall	(Russia) Yuliya Chekalyova	(Norway) Marit Bjørgen
3	(Finland) Ruka	10 km C Pursuit	2 December 2012	(Norway) Marit Bjørgen	(Norway) Therese Johaug	(Norway) Heidi Weng	(Norway) Marit Bjørgen
