= Petr Knop =

Czech cross-country skier

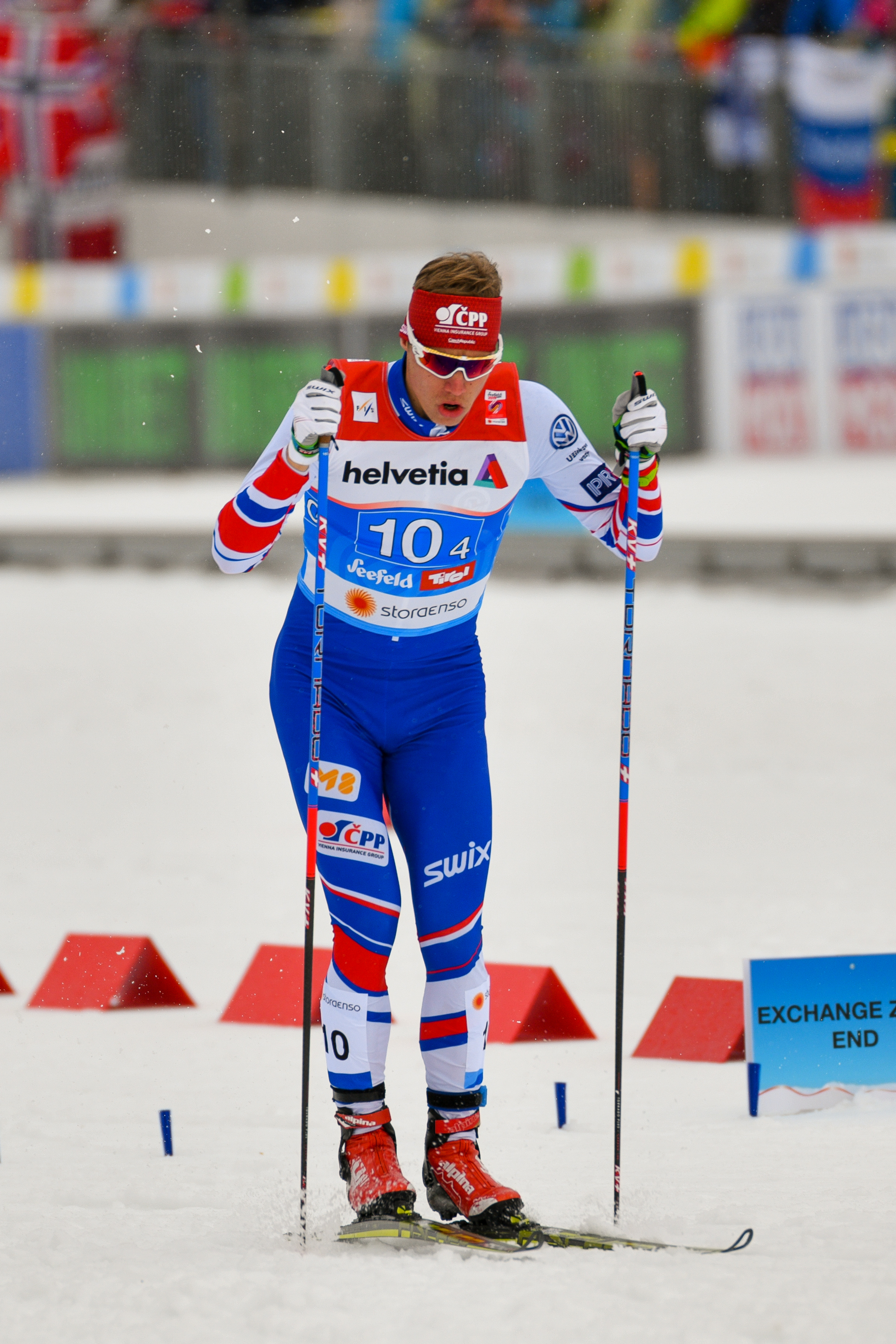
- Knop in 2019

Personal information
- Full name: Petr Knop
- Nationality: Czech Republic
- Born: 12 May 1994 (age 32) Jablonec nad Nisou, Czech Republic

Sport
- Sport: Skiing
- Club: SK Jablonec

World Cup career
- Seasons: 8 – (2014–present)
- Indiv. starts: 82
- Indiv. podiums: 0
- Team starts: 6
- Team podiums: 0
- Overall titles: 0 – (130th in 2020)
- Discipline titles: 0
- Updated on 19 November 2021

Petr Knop (born 12 May 1994) is a Czech cross-country skier.

He represented the Czech Republic at the FIS Nordic World Ski Championships 2015 in Falun.

== Cross-country skiing results ==
All results are sourced from the International Ski Federation (FIS).

=== Olympic Games ===
Year	Age	15 km individual	30 km skiathlon	50 km mass start	Sprint	4 × 10 km relay	Team sprint
2018	23	24	38	55	—	10	—
2022	27	54	44	37^{[a]}	—	12	—

^{a} Distance reduced to 30 km due to weather conditions.

=== World Championships ===
Year	Age	15 km individual	30 km skiathlon	50 km mass start	Sprint	4 × 10 km relay	Team sprint
2015	20	—	46	—	—	9	—
2017	22	38	43	33	—	11	—
2019	24	66	53	48	—	11	—
2021	26	43	37	41	—	11	—

=== World Cup ===
==== Season standings ====
Season	Age	Discipline standings				Ski Tour standings				
Season	Age	Overall	Distance	Sprint	U23	Nordic Opening	Tour de Ski	Ski Tour 2020	World Cup Final	Ski Tour Canada
2014	19	NC	NC	NC	—N/a	—	—	—N/a	—	—N/a
2015	20	NC	NC	NC	NC	86	—	—N/a	—N/a	—N/a
2016	21	NC	NC	NC	NC	67	DNF	—N/a	—N/a	—
2017	22	NC	NC	NC	NC	62	DNF	—N/a	—	—N/a
2018	23	153	101	NC	—N/a	64	31	—N/a	47	—N/a
2019	24	NC	NC	NC	—N/a	70	39	—N/a	—	—N/a
2020	25	130	92	NC	—N/a	—	41	—	—N/a	—N/a
2021	26	137	NC	NC	—N/a	—	49	—N/a	—N/a	—N/a
