= Pursuit racing =

Competitors chasing each other or a leader

Pursuit racing is where two or more competitors (or teams) are either chasing after each other or chasing after a lead competitor or team.

== Cycling ==
In cycling, pursuit racing is a form of track racing.

In individual pursuit, two cyclists begin on opposite sides of the velodrome. After starting at the same time, each cyclist attempts to catch up to the other for the win. The cyclists are also timed, for comparison with other competitors. Men race for 4 kilometres (2.5 mi); women race for 3 kilometres (1.9 mi). At the Olympics beginning in 2012, individual pursuit is competed only as part of the omnium event.

Team pursuit works similarly to individual pursuit. Two teams – each with three or four cyclists – start from opposite sides of the track. The team earns their time based on the third-finishing rider. All events are 4 kilometres (2.5 mi), although through the 2011–2012 season the women's competitions were three cyclists over 3 kilometres (1.9 mi).

== Track and field ==
The modern pentathlon is formatted such that the final event, a cross-country run with target shooting, is essentially a pursuit race. Athlete performance in the prior events determines the times in which they start the race. The idea is that the first athlete to cross the finish line wins the entire event.

== Winter sports ==
In biathlon, pursuit is the second part of a sprint-pursuit race. The sprint is held first. In the subsequent pursuit section, the competitors' starts are staggered according to their times: the sprint winner starts first, whoever finished second by a certain time follows the leader by that time, and so on. (For example, Competitor F finished 5 seconds ahead of Competitor S in the Sprint, so Competitor F will start 5 seconds ahead of Competitor S in the Pursuit event.) Pursuit can follow up to the individual race too. They just divide by 2 your extra time behind the winner of individual race.

In cross-country skiing a pursuit is a race where the skiers start according to results in one or more previous races. The final stage of a ski tour event (i.e. Nordic Opening, Tour de Ski and World Cup Finals) is usually a pursuit where the overall leader starts first and is followed by the others starting behind according to their cumulative time from the stages raced before the pursuit.

In Nordic combined, the pursuit is determined by how well the competitors or team do in the ski jumping part of the competition. This is part of the Gundersen method developed in the 1980s. For the 15 km individual and 7.5 km sprint competitions, the computation is a 1-point advantage at the ski jump equals a 4-second advantage at the start of the cross-country skiing part of the competition. (For example, Competitor A finished the ski jump with 5 more points than Competitor B, so Competitor B must start 20 seconds after Competitor A in the cross-country skiing part.) For the 4 x 5 km team event prior to 2005, the computation was a 1-point advantage at the ski jump equals a 1.5 second advantage in the cross-country skiing part of the competition; since 2005, that computation is 1 point equals 1 second.

Long-track speed skating also has pursuit races. In team pursuit, two teams – each team comprising three skaters – begin on opposite sides of the ice, start at the same time, and attempt to catch the other team in the shortest elapsed time as measured by the third skater. Men race for eight laps and women for six laps.
