= Finn Hågen Krogh =

Norwegian cross-country skier

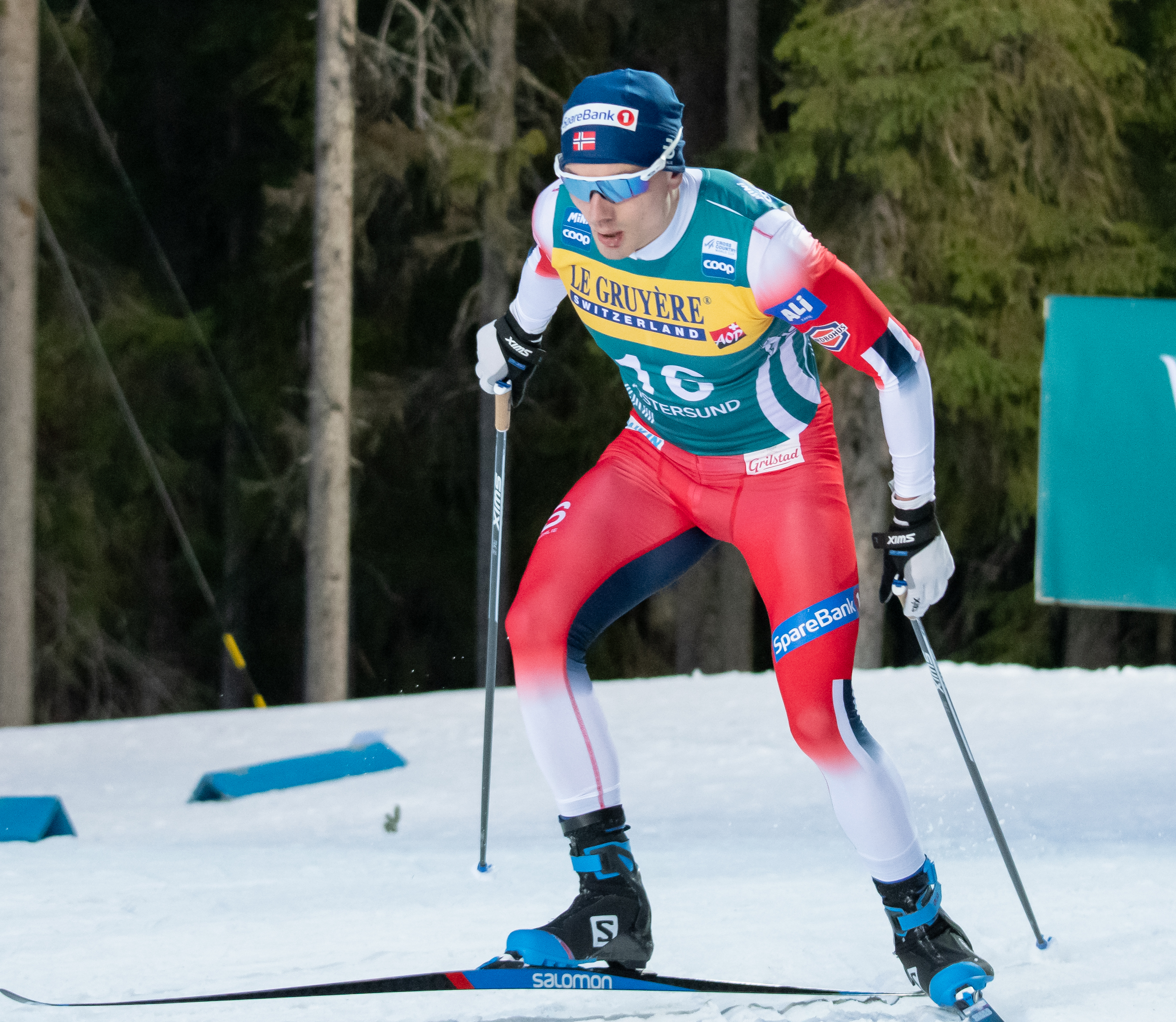
- Finn Hågen Krogh in Östersund, Sweden, 2020

Personal information
- Nationality: Norway
- Born: 6 September 1990 (age 35) Alta, Norway
- Height: 1.74 m (5 ft 9 in)

Sport
- Sport: Skiing
- Club: Tverrelvdalen IL

World Cup career
- Seasons: 12 – (2011–2022)
- Indiv. starts: 161
- Indiv. podiums: 28
- Indiv. wins: 8
- Team starts: 12
- Team podiums: 8
- Team wins: 6
- Overall titles: 0 – (3rd in 2016)
- Discipline titles: 1 – (1 SP)
Medal record
Men's cross-country skiing
Representing Norway
International nordic ski competitions
| Event | 1st | 2nd | 3rd |
|---|---|---|---|
| World Championships | 2 | 0 | 1 |
| Total | 2 | 0 | 1 |
World Championships
| Gold medal – first place | 2015 Falun | Team sprint |
| Gold medal – first place | 2017 Lahti | 4 × 10 km relay |
| Bronze medal – third place | 2017 Lahti | 30 km skiathlon |
Junior World Championships
| Gold medal – first place | 2010 Hinterzarten | 4 × 5 km relay |
| Gold medal – first place | 2010 Hinterzarten | 20 km skiathlon |
| Bronze medal – third place | 2009 Praz de Lys-Sommand | 4 × 5 km relay |
- Updated on 5 January 2023

Finn Hågen Krogh (born 6 September 1990) is a Norwegian cross-country skier who has competed at FIS Cross-Country World Cup since 2011.

== Career ==
Krogh was born in Alta. He is of Sami and Norwegian descent.

Krogh represents Tverrelvdalen IL. In addition to being a cross-country skier, he played for Tverrelvdalen's senior football team in the 3. divisjon before he had to choose between football and skiing. As Krogh was selected for the youth national team in cross-country skiing, he chose to quit football, but said in an interview with Norwegian TV 2 in 2011 that he believes he could have been a professional Tippeligaen player if he had chosen football ahead of skiing. In the same interview he stated that he thinks it is more fun to play football than to compete in cross-country skiing.

=== 2009–2013 ===
Krogh participated in the 2009 Junior World Ski Championships in Praz de Lys-Sommand, Haute-Savoie where he won bronze in the 4x5 km relay. The next year, Krogh won the relay race in the junior world championship in Hinterzarten, along with Tomas Northug, Didrik Tønseth and Pål Golberg. Krogh also won a bronze in the 20 km skiathlon, and finished fourth at 5 km classic. Krogh won gold in 10 km freestyle in the Norwegian youth championship in 2010.

He made his break-through in the World Cup when he finished second behind Petter Northug in the race in Falun on 20 March 2011. He won his first World Cup relay with Eldar Rønning, Lars Berger and Petter Northug on 20 November 2011 at Sjusjøen.

=== 2013–2014 ===
On 1 January 2013 he won the third stage of the 2012–13 Tour de Ski, which was a sprint. In the Norwegian skiing championship in 2013 at Gåsbu in Hamar, he was number two on the 15 free with individual start, 5.1 seconds behind Martin Johnsrud Sundby.

On 28 January 2014, after the Norwegian championship at Lillehammer, the national team coach Arild Monsen stated that Krogh would go the individual sprint in the 2014 Winter Olympics on 11 February 2013 along with Eirik Brandsdal and Anders Gløersen, while the fourth spot was to be decided after the sprint in Toblach. While Petter Northug was one of the favourites to win the Olympic sprint, Ola Vigen Hattestad won the sprint in Toblach, and on 5 February 2014 the national team decided to select both Hattestad and Northug to compete in the sprint at the expense of Krogh.

=== 2014–2015 ===
Krogh won the World Cup title in the sprint discipline. He also won the team freestyle sprint at the FIS World Championships in Falun, with Petter Northug.

=== 2015–2016 ===
Krogh placed second overall in the Tour de Ski.

=== 2020–2021 ===
After the 2020–21 season, it was announced that Krogh had been dropped from the Norwegian National Cross-country Team.

== Cross-country skiing results ==
All results are sourced from the International Ski Federation (FIS).

=== Olympic Games ===
| Year | Age | 15 km individual | 30 km skiathlon | 50 km mass start | Sprint | 4 × 10 km relay | Team sprint |
|---|---|---|---|---|---|---|---|
| 2018 | 27 | 18 | — | — | — | — | — |

=== World Championships ===
- 3 medals – (2 gold, 1 bronze)

| Year | Age | 15 km individual | 30 km skiathlon | 50 km mass start | Sprint | 4 × 10 km relay | Team sprint |
|---|---|---|---|---|---|---|---|
| 2013 | 22 | 31 | — | — | — | — | — |
| 2015 | 24 | 5 | — | — | — | — | Gold |
| 2017 | 26 | — | Bronze | — | 4 | Gold | — |
| 2019 | 28 | — | — | — | 12 | — | — |

==== Season titles ====
- 1 title – (1 sprint)

Season
| Season | Discipline |
| 2015 | Sprint |

==== Season standings ====
| Season | Age | Discipline standings | | | Ski Tour standings | | | | |
| Season | Age | Overall | Distance | Sprint | Nordic Opening | Tour de Ski | Ski Tour 2020 | World Cup Final | Ski Tour Canada |
|---|---|---|---|---|---|---|---|---|---|
| 2011 | 20 | 32 | 48 | 60 | — | — | —N/a | 2nd place, silver medalist(s) | —N/a |
| 2012 | 21 | 87 | 59 | 56 | 28 | — | —N/a | — | —N/a |
| 2013 | 22 | 10 | 31 | 11 | — | — | —N/a | 2nd place, silver medalist(s) | —N/a |
| 2014 | 23 | 21 | 28 | 16 | 29 | DNF | —N/a | 32 | —N/a |
| 2015 | 24 | 4 | 18 | 1st place, gold medalist(s) | 2nd place, silver medalist(s) | — | —N/a | —N/a | —N/a |
| 2016 | 25 | 3rd place, bronze medalist(s) | 4 | 3rd place, bronze medalist(s) | 3rd place, bronze medalist(s) | 2nd place, silver medalist(s) | —N/a | —N/a | 9 |
| 2017 | 26 | 10 | 17 | 4 | 8 | DNF | —N/a | 70 | —N/a |
| 2018 | 27 | 32 | 30 | 36 | 13 | DNF | —N/a | — | —N/a |
| 2019 | 28 | 31 | 46 | 13 | DNF | 20 | —N/a | — | —N/a |
| 2020 | 29 | 28 | 25 | 38 | — | — | 11 | —N/a | —N/a |
| 2021 | 30 | 85 | — | 45 | — | — | —N/a | —N/a | —N/a |
| 2022 | 31 | 70 | — | 35 | —N/a | — | —N/a | —N/a | —N/a |

==== Individual podiums ====
- 8 victories – (4 WC, 4 SWC)
- 28 podiums – (17 WC, 11 SWC)

| No. | Season | Date | Location | Race | Level | Place |
|---|---|---|---|---|---|---|
| 1 | 2010–11 | 20 March 2011 | Falun, Sweden | 15 km Pursuit F | Stage World Cup | 1st |
| 2 | 2010–11 | 16–20 March 2011 | (Sweden) World Cup Final | Overall Standings | World Cup | 2nd |
| 3 | 2012–13 | 1 January 2013 | Val Müstair, Switzerland | 1.4 km Sprint F | Stage World Cup | 1st |
| 4 | 2012–13 | 9 March 2013 | Lahti, Finland | 1.55 km Sprint F | World Cup | 3rd |
| 5 | 2012–13 | 24 March 2013 | Falun, Sweden | 15 km Pursuit F | Stage World Cup | 1st |
| 6 | 2012–13 | 20–24 March 2013 | (Sweden) World Cup Final | Overall Standings | World Cup | 2nd |
| 7 | 2014–15 | 5 December 2014 | Lillehammer, Norway | 1.5 km Sprint F | Stage World Cup | 3rd |
| 8 | 2014–15 | 6 December 2014 | Lillehammer, Norway | 10 km Individual F | Stage World Cup | 2nd |
| 9 | 2014–15 | 5–7 December 2014 | (Norway) Nordic Opening | Overall Standings | World Cup | 2nd |
| 10 | 2014–15 | 14 December 2014 | Davos, Switzerland | 1.3 km Sprint F | World Cup | 1st |
| 11 | 2014–15 | 21 December 2014 | Davos, Switzerland | 1.3 km Sprint F | World Cup | 3rd |
| 12 | 2014–15 | 14 February 2015 | Östersund, Sweden | 1.2 km Sprint C | World Cup | 1st |
| 13 | 2014–15 | 15 February 2015 | Östersund, Sweden | 15 km Individual F | World Cup | 1st |
| 14 | 2014–15 | 11 March 2015 | Drammen, Norway | 1.3 km Sprint C | World Cup | 3rd |
| 15 | 2015–16 | 27–29 November 2015 | (Finland) Nordic Opening | Overall Standings | World Cup | 3rd |
| 16 | 2015–16 | 1 January 2016 | Lenzerheide, Switzerland | 1.5 km Sprint F | Stage World Cup | 3rd |
| 17 | 2015–16 | 3 January 2016 | Lenzerheide, Switzerland | 10 km Pursuit F | Stage World Cup | 3rd |
| 18 | 2015–16 | 8 January 2016 | Toblach, Italy | 10 km Individual F | Stage World Cup | 1st |
| 19 | 2015–16 | 1–10 January 2016 | (Switzerland) (Germany) (Italy) Tour de Ski | Overall Standings | World Cup | 2nd |
| 20 | 2015–16 | 20 February 2016 | Lahti, Finland | 1.6 km Sprint F | World Cup | 2nd |
| 21 | 2015–16 | 21 February 2016 | Lahti, Finland | 15 km + 15 km Skiathlon C/F | World Cup | 2nd |
| 22 | 2016–17 | 11 December 2016 | Davos, Switzerland | 1.6 km Sprint F | World Cup | 3rd |
| 23 | 2016–17 | 17 December 2016 | La Clusaz, France | 15 km Mass Start F | World Cup | 1st |
| 24 | 2016–17 | 31 December 2016 | Val Müstair, Switzerland | 1.5 km Sprint F | Stage World Cup | 3rd |
| 25 | 2016–17 | 18 February 2017 | Otepää, Estonia | 1.6 km Sprint F | World Cup | 2nd |
| 26 | 2016–17 | 17 March 2017 | Quebec City, Canada | 1.5 km Sprint F | Stage World Cup | 2nd |
| 27 | 2018–19 | 9 February 2019 | Lahti, Finland | 1.6 km Sprint F | World Cup | 3rd |
| 28 | 2019–20 | 15 February 2020 | Östersund, Sweden | 15 km Individual F | Stage World Cup | 3rd |

==== Team podiums ====
- 6 victories – (6 RL)
- 8 podiums – (8 RL)

| No. | Season | Date | Location | Race | Level | Place | Teammates |
|---|---|---|---|---|---|---|---|
| 1 | 2011–12 | 20 November 2011 | Sjusjøen, Norway | 4 × 10 km Relay C/F | World Cup | 1st | Rønning / Berger / Northug |
| 2 | 2013–14 | 8 December 2013 | Lillehammer, Norway | 4 × 7.5 km Relay C/F | World Cup | 2nd | Rønning / Jespersen / Røthe |
| 3 | 2015–16 | 6 December 2015 | Lillehammer, Norway | 4 × 7.5 km Relay C/F | World Cup | 2nd | Nyenget / Rundgreen / Sveen |
| 4 | 2015–16 | 24 January 2016 | Nové Město, Czech Republic | 4 × 7.5 km Relay C/F | World Cup | 1st | Røthe / Sundby / Rundgreen |
| 5 | 2016–17 | 18 December 2016 | La Clusaz, France | 4 × 7.5 km Relay C/F | World Cup | 1st | Tønseth / Sundby / Gløersen |
| 6 | 2016–17 | 22 January 2017 | Ulricehamn, Sweden | 4 × 7.5 km Relay C/F | World Cup | 1st | Krüger / Sundby / Gløersen |
| 7 | 2018–19 | 9 December 2018 | Beitostølen, Norway | 4 × 7.5 km Relay C/F | World Cup | 1st | Iversen / Sundby / Røthe |
| 8 | 2019–20 | 8 December 2019 | Lillehammer, Norway | 4 × 7.5 km Relay C/F | World Cup | 3rd | Golberg / Holund / Røthe |
