= FIS Nordic World Ski Championships 2017 – Men's 30 kilometre pursuit =

Men's 30 kilometre pursuit at the FIS Nordic World Ski Championships 2017
- Location: Lahti, Finland
- Date: 25 February
- Competitors: 66 from 29 nations
- Winning time: 1:09:16.7

Medalists
gold medal	Sergey Ustiugov	Russia
silver medal	Martin Johnsrud Sundby	Norway
bronze medal	Finn Hågen Krogh	Norway

The Men's 30 kilometre pursuit event of the FIS Nordic World Ski Championships 2017 was held on 25 February 2017.

== Results ==
The race was started at 14:30.

Rank	Bib	Athlete	Country	Time	Deficit
1st place, gold medalist(s)	4	Sergey Ustiugov	Russia	1:09:16.7	
2nd place, silver medalist(s)	1	Martin Johnsrud Sundby	Norway	1:09:23.4	+6.7
3rd place, bronze medalist(s)	9	Finn Hågen Krogh	Norway	1:09:48.5	+31.8
4	7	Sjur Røthe	Norway	1:09:49.8	+33.1
5	3	Alex Harvey	Canada	1:09:50.0	+33.3
6	8	Didrik Tønseth	Norway	1:09:50.2	+33.5
7	5	Marcus Hellner	Sweden	1:09:50.4	+33.7
8	14	Andrey Larkov	Russia	1:09:52.8	+36.1
9	20	Lari Lehtonen	Finland	1:09:53.9	+37.2
10	31	Giandomenico Salvadori	Italy	1:09:54.0	+37.3
11	11	Andrew Musgrave	Great Britain	1:09:54.4	+37.7
12	18	Keishin Yoshida	Japan	1:09:59.0	+42.3
13	24	Jonas Baumann	Switzerland	1:09:59.9	+43.2
14	6	Maurice Manificat	France	1:10:03.4	+46.7
15	27	Alexander Bolshunov	Russia	1:10:12.7	+56.0
16	17	Florian Notz	Germany	1:10:14.4	+57.7
17	10	Aleksandr Bessmertnykh	Russia	1:10:25.4	+1:08.7
18	2	Matti Heikkinen	Finland	1:10:33.0	+1:16.3
19	21	Lucas Bögl	Germany	1:11:13.4	+1:56.7
20	13	Calle Halfvarsson	Sweden	1:11:44.4	+2:27.7
21	26	Jonas Dobler	Germany	1:11:51.4	+2:34.7
22	15	Jens Burman	Sweden	1:11:52.6	+2:35.9
23	16	Daniel Rickardsson	Sweden	1:11:56.9	+2:40.2
24	40	Sergei Dolidovich	Belarus	1:12:49.2	+3:32.5
25	23	Jason Rüesch	Switzerland	1:12:49.3	+3:32.6
26	12	Jean-Marc Gaillard	France	1:12:49.5	+3:32.8
27	37	Sebastiano Pellegrin	Italy	1:12:50.6	+3:33.9
28	34	Yury Astapenka	Belarus	1:12:53.0	+3:36.3
29	53	Sergey Mikayelyan	Armenia	1:12:53.7	+3:37.0
30	25	Perttu Hyvärinen	Finland	1:12:57.1	+3:40.4
31	47	Max Hauke	Austria	1:12:57.5	+3:40.8
32	19	Clément Parisse	France	1:12:59.2	+3:42.5
33	38	Irineu Esteve Altimiras	Andorra	1:12:59.3	+3:42.6
34	57	Aivar Rehemaa	Estonia	1:13:05.3	+3:48.6
35	48	Philipp Haelg	Liechtenstein	1:13:27.8	+4:11.1
36	45	Karel Tammjärv	Estonia	1:13:33.5	+4:16.8
37	58	Olzhas Klimin	Kazakhstan	1:13:51.9	+4:35.2
38	42	Ville Nousiainen	Finland	1:13:58.1	+4:41.4
39	43	Snorri Einarsson	Iceland	1:14:10.6	+4:53.9
40	35	Michail Semenov	Belarus	1:14:22.3	+5:05.6
41	29	Paul Constantin Pepene	Romania	1:14:23.7	+5:07.0
42	55	Yevgeniy Velichko	Kazakhstan	1:14:46.6	+5:29.9
43	52	Petr Knop	Czech Republic	1:14:47.9	+5:31.2
44	32	Hiroyuki Miyazawa	Japan	1:14:58.2	+5:41.5
45	33	Sergio Rigoni	Italy	1:15:03.6	+5:46.9
46	44	Vitaliy Pukhkalo	Kazakhstan	1:15:31.7	+6:15.0
47	28	Graeme Killick	Canada	1:15:40.2	+6:23.5
48	36	Tad Elliott	United States	1:16:27.9	+7:11.2
49	39	Kyle Bratrud	United States	1:16:33.2	+7:16.5
50	54	Oleksiy Krasovsky	Ukraine	1:17:01.3	+7:44.6
51	56	Jan Antolec	Poland	1:17:26.0	+8:09.3
52	46	Alvar Johannes Alev	Estonia	1:17:40.8	+8:24.1
53	49	Imanol Rojo	Spain	1:17:42.5	+8:25.8
54	60	Kaarel Kasper Kõrge	Estonia	1:17:42.8	+8:26.1
55	59	Knute Johnsgaard	Canada	1:17:56.9	+8:40.2
56	65	Daulet Rakhimbayev	Kazakhstan	1:18:45.3	+9:28.6
57	30	Noah Hoffman	United States	1:18:50.3	+9:33.6
58	61	Thomas Hjalmar Westgård	Ireland	1:19:35.6	+10:18.9
59	63	Callum Smith	Great Britain	LAP	
60	51	Miroslav Rypl	Czech Republic	LAP	
61	62	Oleg Yoltukhovskyy	Ukraine	LAP	
62	67	Deividas Kliševičius	Lithuania	LAP	
63	68	Thibaut De Marre	Belgium	LAP	
—	66	Lukas Jakeliūnas	Lithuania	DNF	
—	64	Callum Watson	Australia	DNF	
—	50	Andrew Young	Great Britain	DNF	
—	22	Devon Kershaw	Canada	DNF	
—	41	Benjamin Lustgarten	United States	DNF	
