= FIS Nordic World Ski Championships 2017 – Men's 4 × 10 kilometre relay =

Men's 4 × 10 kilometre relay at the FIS Nordic World Ski Championships 2017
- Location: Lahti, Finland
- Date: 3 March
- Competitors: 64 from 16 nations
- Teams: 16
- Winning time: 1:37:20.1

Medalists
gold medal	Didrik Tønseth; Niklas Dyrhaug; Martin Johnsrud Sundby; Finn Hågen Krogh	Norway
silver medal	Andrey Larkov; Alexander Bessmertnykh; Aleksey Chervotkin; Sergey Ustiugov	Russia
bronze medal	Daniel Rickardsson; Johan Olsson; Marcus Hellner; Calle Halfvarsson	Sweden

The Men's 4 × 10 kilometre relay event of the FIS Nordic World Ski Championships 2017 was held on 3 March 2017.

== Results ==
The race was started at 13:30.

Rank	Bib	Country	Athlete	Time	Deficit
1st place, gold medalist(s)	1	Norway	Didrik Tønseth; Niklas Dyrhaug; Martin Johnsrud Sundby; Finn Hågen Krogh	1:37:20.1; 21:43.2; 21:35.7; 26:32.5; 27:28.7	
2nd place, silver medalist(s)	4	Russia	Andrey Larkov; Alexander Bessmertnykh; Aleksey Chervotkin; Sergey Ustiugov	1:37:24.7; 21:40.3; 21:38.1; 26:50.7; 27:15.6	+4.6
3rd place, bronze medalist(s)	2	Sweden	Daniel Rickardsson; Johan Olsson; Marcus Hellner; Calle Halfvarsson	1:39:51.9; 22:17.6; 22:37.7; 26:28.8; 28:27.8	+2:31.8
4	5	Switzerland	Jason Rüesch; Jonas Baumann; Dario Cologna; Curdin Perl	1:39:52.1; 22:11.6; 22:11.1; 27:02.0; 28:27.4	+2:32.0
5	8	Finland	Sami Jauhojärvi; Iivo Niskanen; Lari Lehtonen; Matti Heikkinen	1:40:02.5; 22:09.6; 21:39.0; 27:49.6; 28:24.3	+2:42.4
6	7	Germany	Thomas Bing; Jonas Dobler; Florian Notz; Lucas Bögl	1:40:02.9; 22:06.2; 22:34.7; 26:42.7; 28:39.3	+2:42.9
7	3	France	Jean-Marc Gaillard; Maurice Manificat; Robin Duvillard; Clément Parisse	1:41:12.1; 22:10.9; 21:53.8; 28:27.0; 28:40.4	+3:52.0
8	6	Italy	Francesco De Fabiani; Dietmar Nöckler; Giandomenico Salvadori; Federico Pellegrino	1:42:49.9; 22:45.4; 22:29.7; 28:45.4; 28:49.4	+5:29.8
9	12	Kazakhstan	Alexey Poltoranin; Denis Volotka; Olzhas Klimin; Yevgeniy Velichko	1:42:50.7; 22:00.3; 23:16.9; 28:42.5; 28:51.0	+5:30.6
10	11	United States	Kyle Bratrud; Erik Bjornsen; Tad Elliott; Simeon Hamilton	1:42:51.4; 23:08.5; 22:51.5; 28:16.4; 28:35.0	+5:31.3
11	9	Czech Republic	Martin Jakš; Lukáš Bauer; Michal Novák; Petr Knop	1:42:51.9; 22:33.3; 22:38.8; 28:46.9; 28:52.9	+5:31.8
12	10	Canada	Graeme Killick; Devon Kershaw; Alex Harvey; Len Väljas	LAP; 23:45.8; 23:45.5; 27:15.0; LAP	
13	14	Estonia	Raido Ränkel; Algo Kärp; Karel Tammjärv; Aivar Rehemaa	LAP; 23:49.8; 22:56.2; 29:06.4; LAP	
14	16	Romania	Paul Constantin Pepene; Raul Mihai Popa; Petrică Hogiu; Alin Florin Cioancă	LAP; 23:34.8; 24:43.6; LAP	
15	13	Poland	Dominik Bury; Jan Antolec; Maciej Staręga; Paweł Klisz	LAP; 23:35.3; 24:26.3; LAP	
16	15	Ukraine	Oleksii Krasovskyi; Andrii Orlyk; Ruslan Perekhoda; Oleg Yoltukhovskyy	LAP; 24:14.4; 25:47.0; LAP	
