= Matti Heikkinen =

Finnish cross-country skier

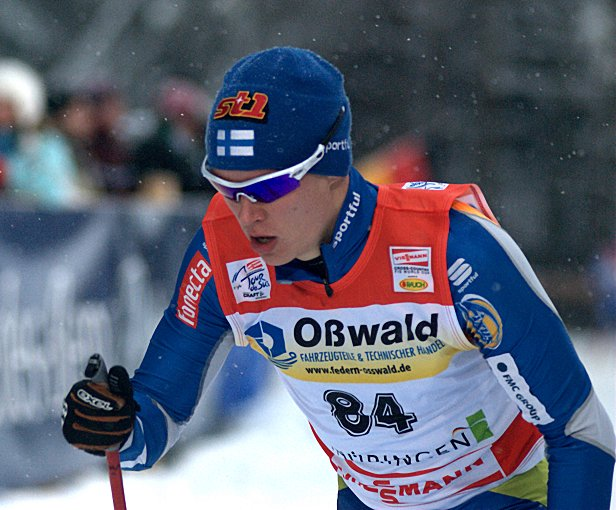
- Heikkinen during the 2009–10 Tour de Ski

Personal information
- Nationality: Finland
- Born: 19 December 1983 (age 42) Kajaani, Finland

Sport
- Sport: Skiing
- Club: Vantaan Hiihtoseura

World Cup career
- Seasons: 17 – (2003–2019)
- Indiv. starts: 203
- Indiv. podiums: 15
- Indiv. wins: 4
- Team starts: 16
- Team podiums: 0
- Overall titles: 0 – (5th in 2017)
- Discipline titles: 0
Medal record
Men's cross-country skiing
Representing Finland
World Championships
Gold medal – first place	2011 Oslo	15 km classical
Bronze medal – third place	2009 Liberec	15 km classical
Bronze medal – third place	2009 Liberec	4 × 10 km relay
Bronze medal – third place	2017 Lahti	50 km freestyle
- Updated on 2 April 2019

Matti Heikkinen (born 19 December 1983 in Kajaani) is a Finnish former cross-country skier and World Champion who competed from 2002 to 2019.

== Career ==
Heikkinen won his first World Championship at the FIS Nordic World Ski Championships 2011 in Holmenkollen 2011. Winning 15 km, he is the first Finnish men's World Champion for over a decade. He also won two bronze medals at the FIS Nordic World Ski Championships 2009 in Liberec, earning them in the 15 km and 4 × 10 km relay events.

In December 2009, Heikkinen took his first World Cup victory on the 15 km freestyle event in Davos.

Heikkinen finished fifth in the 4 × 10 km relay at the 2010 Winter Olympics in Vancouver, Canada.

He announced his retirement from cross-country skiing in March 2019.

Heikkinen lives in Jyväskylä and studies at the University of Jyväskylä School of Business.

== Cross-country skiing results ==
All results are sourced from the International Ski Federation (FIS).

=== Olympic Games ===
Year	Age	15 km individual	30 km skiathlon	50 km mass start	Sprint	4 × 10 km relay	Team sprint
2010	26	39	DNF	—	—	5	—
2014	30	20	39	15	—	6	—
2018	34	10	21	25	—	4	—

=== World Championships ===
- 4 medals – (1 gold, 3 bronze)

Year	Age	15 km individual	30 km skiathlon	50 km mass start	Sprint	4 × 10 km relay	Team sprint
2009	25	Bronze	11	37	—	Bronze	—
2011	27	Gold	18	—	—	4	—
2013	29	12	17	25	—	5	—
2015	31	21	16	20	—	8	—
2017	33	11	18	Bronze	—	5	—
2019	35	—	12	11	—	4	—

=== World Cup ===
==== Season standings ====
Season	Age	Discipline standings			Ski Tour standings			
Season	Age	Overall	Distance	Sprint	Nordic Opening	Tour de Ski	World Cup Final	Ski Tour Canada
2003	19	NC	—N/a	—	—N/a	—N/a	—N/a	—N/a
2004	20	NC	NC	—	—N/a	—N/a	—N/a	—N/a
2005	21	156	98	NC	—N/a	—N/a	—N/a	—N/a
2006	22	NC	NC	—	—N/a	—N/a	—N/a	—N/a
2007	23	169	113	—	—N/a	—	—N/a	—N/a
2008	24	65	44	71	—N/a	—	14	—N/a
2009	25	30	19	102	—N/a	26	19	—N/a
2010	26	13	9	72	—N/a	12	24	—N/a
2011	27	25	18	54	DNF	DNF	21	—N/a
2012	28	44	28	NC	—	24	DNF	—N/a
2013	29	39	27	NC	18	DNF	18	—N/a
2014	30	28	18	NC	17	DNF	9	—N/a
2015	31	20	15	NC	7	—	—N/a	—N/a
2016	32	17	17	NC	—	18	—N/a	6
2017	33	5	3rd place, bronze medalist(s)	NC	3rd place, bronze medalist(s)	5	24	—N/a
2018	34	35	24	NC	14	—	DNF	—N/a
2019	35	119	82	NC	DNF	DNF	48	—N/a

==== Individual podiums ====
- 4 victories – (1 WC, 3 SWC)
- 15 podiums – (5 WC, 10 SWC)

No.	Season	Date	Location	Race	Level	Place
1	2009–10	21 November 2009	Beitostølen, Norway	15 km Individual F	World Cup	3rd
2	2009–10	12 December 2009	Davos, Switzerland	15 km Individual F	World Cup	1st
3	2009–10	2 January 2010	Oberhof, Germany	15 km Pursuit C	Stage World Cup	3rd
4	2010–11	3 January 2010	Oberstdorf, Germany	10 km + 10 km Pursuit C/F	Stage World Cup	1st
5	2014–15	25 January 2015	Rybinsk, Russia	15 km + 15 km Skiathlon C/F	World Cup	3rd
6	2015–16	25 January 2015	Val di Fiemme, Italy	9 km Pursuit F	Stage World Cup	3rd
7	2015–16	9 March 2016	Canmore, Canada	15 km + 15 km Skiathlon C/F	Stage World Cup	3rd
8	2015–16	11 March 2016	Canmore, Canada	15 km Individual F	Stage World Cup	1st
9	2015–16	12 March 2016	Canmore, Canada	15 km Pursuit C	Stage World Cup	2nd
10	2016–17	4 December 2016	Lillehammer, Norway	15 km Pursuit C	Stage World Cup	1st
11	2016–17	2–4 December 2016	(Norway) Nordic Opening	Overall Standings	World Cup	2nd
12	2016–17	10 December 2016	Davos, Switzerland	30 km Individual F	World Cup	3rd
13	2016–17	7 January 2017	Val di Fiemme, Italy	15 km Mass Start C	Stage World Cup	3rd
14	2016–17	8 January 2017	Val di Fiemme, Italy	9 km Pursuit F	Stage World Cup	2nd
15	2017–18	26 November 2017	Rukatunturi, Finland	15 km Pursuit F	Stage World Cup	2nd
