= Cross-country skiing at the 2018 Winter Olympics – Men's 30 kilometre skiathlon =

Men's 30 kilometre skiathlon at the XXIII Olympic Winter Games
- Cross-country skiing
- Venue: Alpensia Cross-Country Skiing Centre
- Dates: 11 February 2018
- Competitors: 68 from 30 nations
- Winning time: 1:16:20.0

Medalists
1st place, gold medalist(s)		Simen Hegstad Krüger	Norway
2nd place, silver medalist(s)		Martin Johnsrud Sundby	Norway
3rd place, bronze medalist(s)		Hans Christer Holund	Norway

The men's 30 kilometre skiathlon cross-country skiing competition at the 2018 Winter Olympics was held on 11 February 2018 at 15:15 KST at the Alpensia Cross-Country Skiing Centre in Pyeongchang, South Korea. The event, split into half distance classic skiing and half distance skate skiing, was won by Simen Hegstad Krüger, for whom this was the first Olympic medal. There was a podium sweep for Norway with Martin Johnsrud Sundby and Hans Christer Holund winning silver and bronze medals, respectively.

== Summary ==
The field included all the 2014 medalists: the defending champion Dario Cologna, the silver medalist Marcus Hellner, who was also the 2010 champion, and the bronze medalist Martin Johnsrud Sundby. Only Sundby returned to the podium.

At 20 km, a group of 15 skiers, which included all eventual medalists, was leading the race, about 20 seconds ahead of the rest of the field. About 5 km before the finish line, Krüger escaped and was not caught by the rest, winning the gold medal. From the chasing group, Sundby and Holund escaped less than 2 km before the finish. Eventually, Sundby was leading, and Holund did not catch him, winning bronze.

== Qualification ==
A total of up to 310 cross-country skiers qualified across all eleven events. Athletes qualified for this event by having met the A qualification standard, which meant having 100 or less FIS Points in the distance classification. The Points list takes into average the best results of athletes per discipline during the qualification period (1 July 2016 to 21 January 2018). Countries received additional quotas by having athletes ranked in the top 30 of the FIS Olympics Points list (two per gender maximum, overall across all events). Countries also received an additional quota (one per gender maximum) if an athlete was ranked in the top 300 of the FIS Olympics Points list. After the distribution of B standard quotas, the remaining quotas were distributed using the Olympic FIS Points list, with each athlete only counting once for qualification purposes. A country could only enter a maximum of four athletes for the event.

== Competition schedule ==
All times are (UTC+9).

Date	Time	Event
11 February	15:15	Final

== Results ==
The race was started at 15:15.

Rank	Bib	Name	Country	15 km classic	Rank	Pitstop	15 km free	Rank	Finish time	Deficit
1st place, gold medalist(s)	7	Simen Hegstad Krüger	Norway	40:46.1	14	27.7	35:06.2	1	1:16:20.0	–
2nd place, silver medalist(s)	6	Martin Johnsrud Sundby	Norway	40:30.5	2	35.1	35:22.4	2	1:16:28.0	+8.0
3rd place, bronze medalist(s)	5	Hans Christer Holund	Norway	40:33.3	7	28.5	35:28.1	5	1:16:29.9	+9.9
4	16	Denis Spitsov	Olympic Athletes from Russia	40:35.0	13	31.2	35:26.5	3	1:16:32.7	+12.7
5	2	Maurice Manificat	France	40:33.6	8	30.0	35:30.6	6	1:16:34.2	+14.2
6	3	Dario Cologna	Switzerland	40:30.9	3	32.3	35:41.9	12	1:16:45.1	+25.1
7	10	Andrew Musgrave	Great Britain	40:34.9	12	31.9	35:38.9	9	1:16:45.7	+25.7
8	4	Alex Harvey	Canada	40:31.4	4	27.3	35:54.7	14	1:16:53.4	+33.4
9	22	Martin Jakš	Czech Republic	40:53.2	19	33.6	35:27.0	4	1:16:53.8	+33.8
10	1	Johannes Høsflot Klæbo	Norway	40:31.8	5	26.8	36:04.8	18	1:17:03.4	+43.4
11	20	Thomas Bing	Germany	40:34.4	11	28.6	36:00.7	16	1:17:03.7	+43.7
12	14	Marcus Hellner	Sweden	40:34.2	10	30.3	36:00.3	15	1:17:04.8	+44.8
13	18	Clément Parisse	France	40:48.9	17	28.0	35:51.7	13	1:17:08.6	+48.6
14	15	Daniel Rickardsson	Sweden	40:34.0	9	34.1	36:04.1	17	1:17:12.1	+52.2
15	41	Jules Lapierre	France	41:13.0	24	32.9	35:33.2	8	1:17:19.1	+59.1
16	21	Lucas Bögl	Germany	40:47.2	15	27.5	36:05.2	19	1:17:19.9	+59.9
17	25	Jens Burman	Sweden	41:13.4	25	31.1	35:39.4	10	1:17:23.9	+1:03.9
18	33	Scott Patterson	United States	41:14.4	26	31.9	35:41.2	11	1:17:27.5	+1:07.5
19	8	Iivo Niskanen	Finland	40:30.0	1	29.9	36:34.3	26	1:17:34.2	+1:14.2
20	13	Francesco De Fabiani	Italy	41:11.4	22	30.0	36:13.5	20	1:17:54.9	+1:34.9
21	12	Matti Heikkinen	Finland	41:55.6	34	28.3	35:32.0	7	1:17:55.9	+1:35.9
22	35	Jonas Dobler	Germany	40:52.7	18	32.4	36:31.5	25	1:17.56.6	+1:36.6
23	28	Alexey Vitsenko	Olympic Athletes from Russia	41:09.2	20	32.4	36:20.6	22	1:18:02.2	+1:42.2
24	43	Paul Constantin Pepene	Romania	41:16.2	30	26.4	36:37.8	28	1:18:20.4	+2:00.4
25	23	Keishin Yoshida	Japan	41:11.9	23	33.6	36:37.5	27	1:18:23.0	+2:03.0
26	31	Giandomenico Salvadori	Italy	40:47.8	16	28.2	37:20.9	36	1:18:36.9	+2:16.9
27	38	Max Hauke	Austria	41:15.7	29	31.4	36:57.5	32	1:18:44.6	+2:24.6
28	9	Jean-Marc Gaillard	France	40:32.6	6	26.8	37:49.1	38	1:18:48.5	+2:28.5
29	29	Andrey Melnichenko	Olympic Athletes from Russia	41:46.4	32	34.0	36:30.1	24	1:18:50.5	+2:30.5
30	11	Andrey Larkov	Olympic Athletes from Russia	41:37.5	31	35.1	36:38.0	29	1:18:50.6	+2:30.6
31	34	Candide Pralong	Switzerland	42:26.0	39	33.5	36:16.1	21	1:19:15.6	+2:55.6
32	36	Karel Tammjärv	Estonia	41:56.6	35	36.2	36:52.4	31	1:19:25.2	+3:05.2
33	24	Lari Lehtonen	Finland	42:28.9	41	29.6	36:28.1	23	1:19:26.6	+3:06.6
34	49	Vitaliy Pukhalo	Kazakhstan	42:27.0	40	33.8	36:45.9	30	1:19:46.7	+3:26.7
35	32	Andreas Katz	Germany	41:10.3	21	29.5	38:09.4	42	1:19:49.2	+3:29.2
36	37	Devon Kershaw	Canada	41:14.8	27	32.9	38:07.6	41	1:19:55.3	+3:35.3
37	30	Dietmar Nöckler	Italy	41:15.2	28	34.8	38:05.5	40	1:19:55.5	+3:35.5
38	58	Petr Knop	Czech Republic	42:29.8	43	31.6	37:10.7	34	1:20:12.1	+3:52.1
39	19	Jonas Baumann	Switzerland	42:25.7	38	27.6	37:20.1	35	1:20:13.4	+3:53.4
40	27	Toni Livers	Switzerland	42:36.1	44	36.5	37:00.8	33	1:20:13.4	+3:53.4
41	42	Perttu Hyvärinen	Finland	41:57.0	36	33.5	37:58.0	39	1:20:28.5	+4:08.5
42	26	Erik Bjornsen	United States	42:12.4	37	29.6	38:12.7	43	1:20:54.7	+4:34.7
43	44	Yevgeniy Velichko	Kazakhstan	41:47.4	33	32.1	38:44.4	51	1:21:03.9	+4:43.9
44	46	Michail Semenov	Belarus	43:15.4	48	28.7	37:27.9	37	1:21:12.0	+4:52.0
45	54	Graeme Killick	Canada	42:29.4	42	35.7	38:34.5	48	1:21:39.6	+5:19.6
46	39	Irineu Esteve Altimiras	Andorra	42:39.0	45	37.5	38:31.2	46	1:21:47.7	+5:27.7
47	51	Andreas Veerpalu	Estonia	43:03.9	47	33.9	38:33.6	47	1:22:11.4	+5:51.4
48	52	Sergio Rigoni	Italy	42:41.7	46	32.6	39:40.6	57	1:22:54.9	+6:34.9
49	57	Imanol Rojo	Spain	43:27.4	49	33.8	39:05.3	54	1:23:06.5	+6:46.5
50	45	Yury Astapenka	Belarus	44:01.9	54	33.4	38:37.2	49	1:23:12.5	+6:52.5
51	40	Patrick Caldwell	United States	44:01.3	53	32.7	38:44.1	50	1:23:18.1	+6:58.1
52	55	Dominik Bury	Poland	44:00.2	52	35.7	38:44.4	51	1:23:20.3	+7:00.3
53	65	Krešimir Crnković	Croatia	44:31.3	58	30.5	38:25.1	44	1:23:26.9	+7:06.9
54	47	Noah Hoffman	United States	43:27.7	50	30.4	39:30.6	56	1:23:28.7	+7:08.7
55	53	Aleš Razým	Czech Republic	43:28.5	51	36.0	39:29.3	55	1:23:33.8	+7:13.8
56	48	Snorri Einarsson	Iceland	44:02.3	55	36.8	38:54.8	53	1:23:33.9	+7:13.9
57	63	Callum Smith	Great Britain	44:47.1	61	33.2	38:29.6	45	1:23:49.9	+7:29.9
58	62	Callum Watson	Australia	44:47.7	62	31.7	39:56.0	58	1:25:15.4	+8:55.4
59	66	Martin Vögeli	Liechtenstein	44:28.4	57	27.1	41:12.7	59	1:26:08.2	+9:48.2
60	60	Thomas Hjalmar Westgård	Ireland	44:15.2	56	33.1	47:45.9	60	1:32:34.2	+16:14.2
61	59	Oleksiy Krasovsky	Ukraine	44:36.7	59	34.1	LAP			
62	61	Knute Johnsgaard	Canada	45:49.7	63	36.0	LAP			
63	67	Mantas Strolia	Lithuania	47:04.4	65	28.3	LAP			
64	64	Wang Qiang	China	47:03.8	64	33.9	LAP			
65	68	Kim Eun-ho	South Korea	48:29.9	66	33.1	LAP			
	56	Edi Dadić	Croatia	44:45.2	60	30.2	DNF			
	17	Calle Halfvarsson	Sweden	DNF						
	50	Sergei Dolidovich	Belarus	DNF						
