= Didrik Tønseth (skier) =

Norwegian cross-country skier (born 1991)

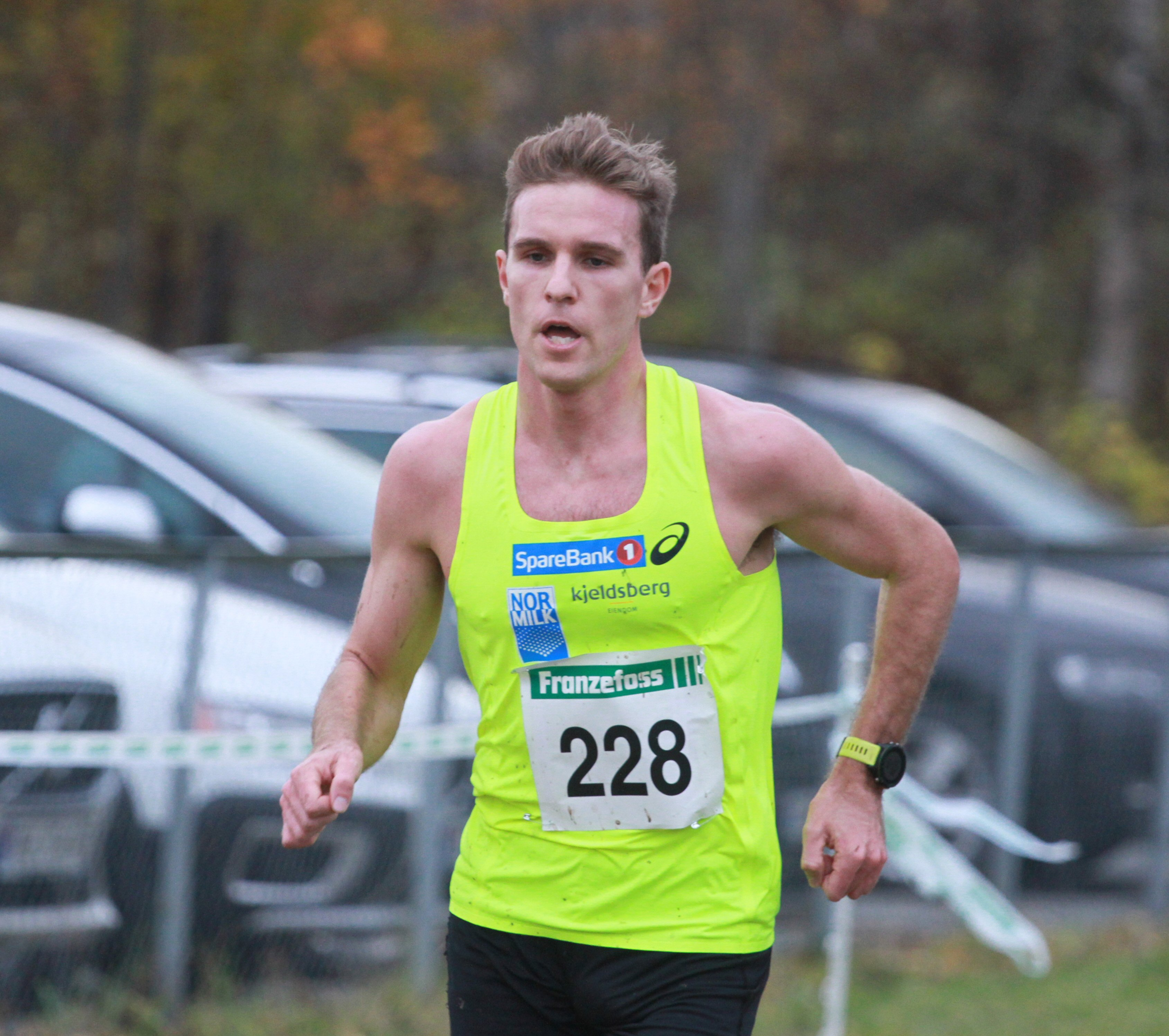
- Tønseth in 2018

Personal information
- Nationality: Norway
- Born: 10 May 1991 (age 35) Trondheim, Norway

Sport
- Sport: Skiing
- Club: Byåsen IL

World Cup career
- Seasons: 14 – (2012–present)
- Indiv. starts: 160
- Indiv. podiums: 20
- Indiv. wins: 4
- Team starts: 10
- Team podiums: 9
- Team wins: 2
- Overall titles: 0 – (5th in 2019, 2023)
- Discipline titles: 0
Medal record
Men's cross-country skiing
Representing Norway
Olympic Games
Gold medal – first place	2018 Pyeongchang	4 × 10 km relay
World Championships
Gold medal – first place	2015 Falun	4 × 10 km relay
Gold medal – first place	2017 Lahti	4 × 10 km relay
Junior World Championships
Gold medal – first place	2010 Hinterzarten	4 × 5 km relay
- Updated on 26 January 2025

Didrik Tønseth (also spelled Toenseth; born 10 May 1991) is a Norwegian cross-country skier and runner.

== Biography ==
Tønset has competed in the World Cup since the 2011–12 season.

He represented Norway at the FIS Nordic World Ski Championships 2015 in Falun. Known for his classic technique, Tønseth proved to be equally adept at freestyle, proving this in the 30 km where he was the sole Norwegian with a shot at a medal. He narrowly lost the final sprint to Canadian Alex Harvey, and came fourth. He skied the second leg of the relay, earning him a gold medal after Northug's strong finish.

In athletics, he represented his country at the 2019 European Cross Country Championships, finishing 24th in the senior race.

== Cross-country skiing results ==
All results are sourced from the International Ski Federation (FIS).

=== Olympic Games ===
- 1 medal – (1 gold)

Year	Age	15 km individual	30 km skiathlon	50 km mass start	Sprint	4 × 10 km relay	Team sprint
2018	26	—	—	—	—	Gold	—

=== World Championships ===
- 2 medals – (2 gold)

Year	Age	15 km individual	30 km skiathlon	50 km mass start	Sprint	4 × 10 km relay	Team sprint
2015	23	—	4	8	—	Gold	—
2017	25	5	6	—	—	Gold	—
2019	27	5	—	—	—	—	—
2023	31	—	—	7	—	—	—

=== World Cup ===
==== Season standings ====
Season	Age	Discipline standings			Ski Tour standings				
Season	Age	Overall	Distance	Sprint	Nordic Opening	Tour de Ski	Ski Tour 2020	World Cup Final	Ski Tour Canada
2012	20	133	83	NC	—	—	—N/a	—	—N/a
2013	21	80	51	—	—	—	—N/a	—	—N/a
2014	22	27	25	99	—	9	—N/a	25	—N/a
2015	23	21	17	NC	5	—	—N/a	—N/a	—N/a
2016	24	9	6	46	6	7	—N/a	—N/a	DNF
2017	25	18	12	93	—	12	—N/a	10	—N/a
2018	26	16	12	NC	7	17	—N/a	16	—N/a
2019	27	5	5	55	1st place, gold medalist(s)	11	—N/a	8	—N/a
2020	28	31	21	NC	7	DNF	—	—N/a	—N/a
2021	29	100	80	NC	27	—	—N/a	—N/a	—N/a
2022	30	6	5	NC	—N/a	7	—N/a	—N/a	—N/a
2023	31	5	3rd place, bronze medalist(s)	113	—N/a	9	—N/a	—N/a	—N/a
2024	32	23	11	NC	—N/a	DNF	—N/a	—N/a	—N/a
2025	33	87	52	—	—N/a	—	—N/a	—N/a	—N/a

==== Individual podiums ====
- 4 victories – (3 WC, 1 SWC)
- 20 podiums – (13 WC, 7 SWC)

No.	Season	Date	Location	Race	Level	Place
1	2013–14	7 December 2013	Lillehammer, Norway	15 km Individual C	World Cup	3rd
2	2014–15	7 December 2014	Lillehammer, Norway	15 km Pursuit C	Stage World Cup	1st
3	2014–15	13 December 2014	Davos, Switzerland	15 km Individual C	World Cup	1st
4	2015–16	2 January 2016	Lenzerheide, Switzerland	30 km Mass Start C	Stage World Cup	3rd
5	2016–17	1 January 2017	Val Müstair, Switzerland	10 km Mass Start C	Stage World Cup	3rd
6	2017–18	25 November 2017	Rukatunturi, Finland	15 km Individual C	Stage World Cup	2nd
7	2018–19	1 December 2018	Lillehammer, Norway	15 km Individual F	Stage World Cup	2nd
8	2018–19	30 November – 2 December 2018	(Norway) Nordic Opening	Overall Standings	World Cup	1st
9	2018–19	20 January 2019	Otepää, Estonia	15 km Individual C	World Cup	3rd
10	2018–19	26 January 2019	Ulricehamn, Sweden	15 km Individual F	World Cup	3rd
11	2018–19	17 March 2019	Falun, Sweden	15 km Individual F	World Cup	3rd
12	2018–19	23 March 2019	Quebec City, Canada	15 km Mass Start C	Stage World Cup	3rd
13	2021–22	6 March 2022	Oslo, Norway	50 km Mass Start C	World Cup	3rd
14	2021–22	12 March 2022	Falun, Sweden	15 km Individual F	World Cup	1st
15	2022–23	2 December 2022	Lillehammer, Norway	10 km Individual F	World Cup	2nd
16	2022–23	10 December 2022	Beitostølen, Norway	10 km Individual C	World Cup	2nd
17	2022–23	3 January 2023	Oberstdorf, Germany	10 km Individual C	Stage World Cup	3rd
18	2023–24	10 December 2023	Östersund, Sweden	10 km Individual F	World Cup	3rd
19	2023–24	16 December 2023	Trondheim, Norway	10 km + 10 km Skiathlon C/F	World Cup	3rd
20	2024–25	26 January 2025	Engadin, Switzerland	20 km Mass Start F	World Cup	3rd

==== Team podiums ====
- 2 victories – (2 RL)
- 9 podiums – (9 RL)

No.	Season	Date	Location	Race	Level	Place	Teammates
1	2012–13	20 January 2013	La Clusaz, France	4 × 7.5 km Relay C/F	World Cup	1st	Rønning / Sundby / Røthe
2	2013–14	8 December 2013	Lillehammer, Norway	4 × 7.5 km Relay C/F	World Cup	3rd	Golberg / Sundby / Northug
3	2015–16	6 December 2015	Lillehammer, Norway	4 × 7.5 km Relay C/F	World Cup	3rd	Iversen / Røthe / Gløersen
4	2016–17	18 December 2016	La Clusaz, France	4 × 7.5 km Relay C/F	World Cup	1st	Sundby / Gløersen / Krogh
5	2018–19	9 December 2018	Beitostølen, Norway	4 × 7.5 km Relay C/F	World Cup	3rd	Holund / Haga / Krüger
6	2018–19	27 January 2019	Ulricehamn, Sweden	4 × 7.5 km Relay C/F	World Cup	3rd	Holund / Røthe / Krüger
7	2021-22	13 March 2022	Falun, Sweden	4 × 5 km Mixed Relay F	World Cup	3rd	Weng / Holund / Johaug
8	2022–23	5 February 2023	Toblach, Italy	4 × 7.5 km Relay C/F	World Cup	3rd	Røthe / Krüger / Amundsen
9	2023–24	21 January 2024	Oberhof, Germany	4 × 7.5 km Relay C/F	World Cup	3rd	Taugbøl / Krüger / Stenshagen
