= FIS Nordic World Ski Championships 2017 – Men's 50 kilometre freestyle =

Men's 50 kilometre freestyle at the FIS Nordic World Ski Championships 2017
- Location: Lahti, Finland
- Date: 5 March
- Competitors: 69 from 25 nations
- Winning time: 1:46:28.9

Medalists
gold medal	Alex Harvey	Canada
silver medal	Sergey Ustiugov	Russia
bronze medal	Matti Heikkinen	Finland

The Men's 50 kilometre freestyle event of the FIS Nordic World Ski Championships 2017 was held on 5 March 2017.

== Results ==
The race was started at 14:30.

Rank	Bib	Athlete	Country	Time	Deficit
1st place, gold medalist(s)	3	Alex Harvey	Canada	1:46:28.9	
2nd place, silver medalist(s)	4	Sergey Ustiugov	Russia	1:46:29.5	+0.6
3rd place, bronze medalist(s)	2	Matti Heikkinen	Finland	1:46:30.3	+1.4
4	10	Andrew Musgrave	Great Britain	1:46:31.8	+2.9
5	1	Martin Johnsrud Sundby	Norway	1:46:31.9	+3.0
6	9	Sjur Røthe	Norway	1:46:32.3	+3.4
7	6	Dario Cologna	Switzerland	1:46:37.8	+8.9
8	18	Petter Northug	Norway	1:46:41.2	+12.3
9	8	Maurice Manificat	France	1:46:42.3	+13.4
10	7	Hans Christer Holund	Norway	1:46:43.2	+14.3
11	14	Anders Gløersen	Norway	1:46:45.3	+16.4
12	5	Marcus Hellner	Sweden	1:46:45.8	+16.9
13	21	Aleksey Chervotkin	Russia	1:46:53.5	+24.6
14	29	Martin Jakš	Czech Republic	1:46:56.4	+27.5
15	13	Jens Burman	Sweden	1:46:57.2	+28.3
16	20	Clément Parisse	France	1:47:03.3	+34.4
17	37	Roman Furger	Switzerland	1:47:04.9	+36.0
18	24	Lucas Bögl	Germany	1:47:14.5	+45.6
19	28	Martin Johansson	Sweden	1:47:33.0	+1:04.1
20	17	Keishin Yoshida	Japan	1:48:38.6	+2:09.7
21	12	Jean Marc Gaillard	France	1:49:29.3	+3:00.4
22	44	Sergei Dolidovich	Belarus	1:49:38.5	+3:09.6
23	22	Lari Lehtonen	Finland	1:49:39.5	+3:10.6
24	31	Jonas Dobler	Germany	1:49:40.1	+3:11.2
25	19	Robin Duvillard	France	1:49:40.2	+3:11.3
26	23	Johan Olsson	Sweden	1:49:44.0	+3:15.1
27	41	Tad Elliott	United States	1:49:45.7	+3:16.8
28	26	Andrey Melnichenko	Russia	1:50:23.3	+3:54.4
29	34	Paul Constantin Pepene	Romania	1:50:47.3	+4:18.4
30	40	Michail Semenov	Belarus	1:51:04.9	+4:36.0
31	11	Petr Sedov	Russia	1:51:08.7	+4:39.8
32	39	Yury Astapenka	Belarus	1:51:09.0	+4:40.1
33	52	Petr Knop	Czech Republic	1:51:09.3	+4:40.4
34	57	Jan Antolec	Poland	1:51:09.6	+4:40.7
35	50	Max Hauke	Austria	1:51:13.1	+4:44.2
36	49	Michal Novák	Czech Republic	1:51:57.5	+5:28.6
37	15	Toni Livers	Switzerland	1:52:05.1	+5:36.2
38	25	Devon Kershaw	Canada	1:52:14.4	+5:45.5
39	47	Vitaliy Pukhkalo	Kazakhstan	1:52:23.3	+5:54.4
40	42	Sebastiano Pellegrin	Italy	1:52:35.9	+6:07.0
41	53	Sergey Mikayelyan	Armenia	1:52:43.0	+6:14.1
42	46	Kusti Kittilä	Finland	1:52:44.3	+6:15.4
43	32	Graeme Killick	Canada	1:53:32.9	+7:04.0
44	30	Perttu Hyvärinen	Finland	1:53:47.9	+7:19.0
45	27	Bernhard Tritscher	Austria	1:54:49.5	+8:20.6
46	36	Sergio Rigoni	Italy	1:55:07.3	+8:38.4
47	16	Florian Notz	Germany	1:55:07.8	+8:38.9
48	48	Ales Razym	Czech Republic	1:55:08.0	+8:39.1
49	58	Aivar Rehemaa	Estonia	1:55:16.4	+8:47.5
50	35	Noah Hoffman	United States	1:55:22.0	+8:53.1
51	56	Andreas Veerpalu	Estonia	1:56:03.3	+9:34.4
52	55	Petrica Hogiu	Romania	1:56:39.0	+10:10.1
53	62	Callum Smith	Great Britain	1:57:05.0	+10:36.1
54	33	Curdin Perl	Switzerland	1:58:02.3	+11:33.4
55	60	Knute Johnsgaard	Canada	1:58:32.2	+12:03.3
56	65	Phillip Bellingham	Australia	1:58:42.7	+12:13.8
57	61	Indulis Bikše	Latvia	1:59:04.6	+12:35.7
58	64	Daulet Rakhimbayev	Kazakhstan	2:00:47.5	+14:18.6
59	59	Olzhas Klimin	Kazakhstan	2:00:51.8	+14:22.9
60	66	Lasse Hulgaard	Denmark	2:02:15.5	+15:46.6
61	67	Jens Hulgaard	Denmark	2:09:46.7	+23:17.8
62	68	Tue Rømer	Denmark	2:11:35.4	+25:06.5
—	38	Veselin Tzinzov	Bulgaria	DNF	
—	43	Kyle Bratrud	United States	DNF	
—	45	Mikhail Kuklin	Belarus	DNF	
—	51	Imanol Rojo	Spain	DNF	
—	54	Yevgeniy Velichko	Kazakhstan	DNF	
—	63	Callum Watson	Australia	DNF	
—	69	Paul Kovács	Australia	DNF	
