= Ragnhild Gløersen Haga =

Norwegian cross-country skier

Ragnhild Haga
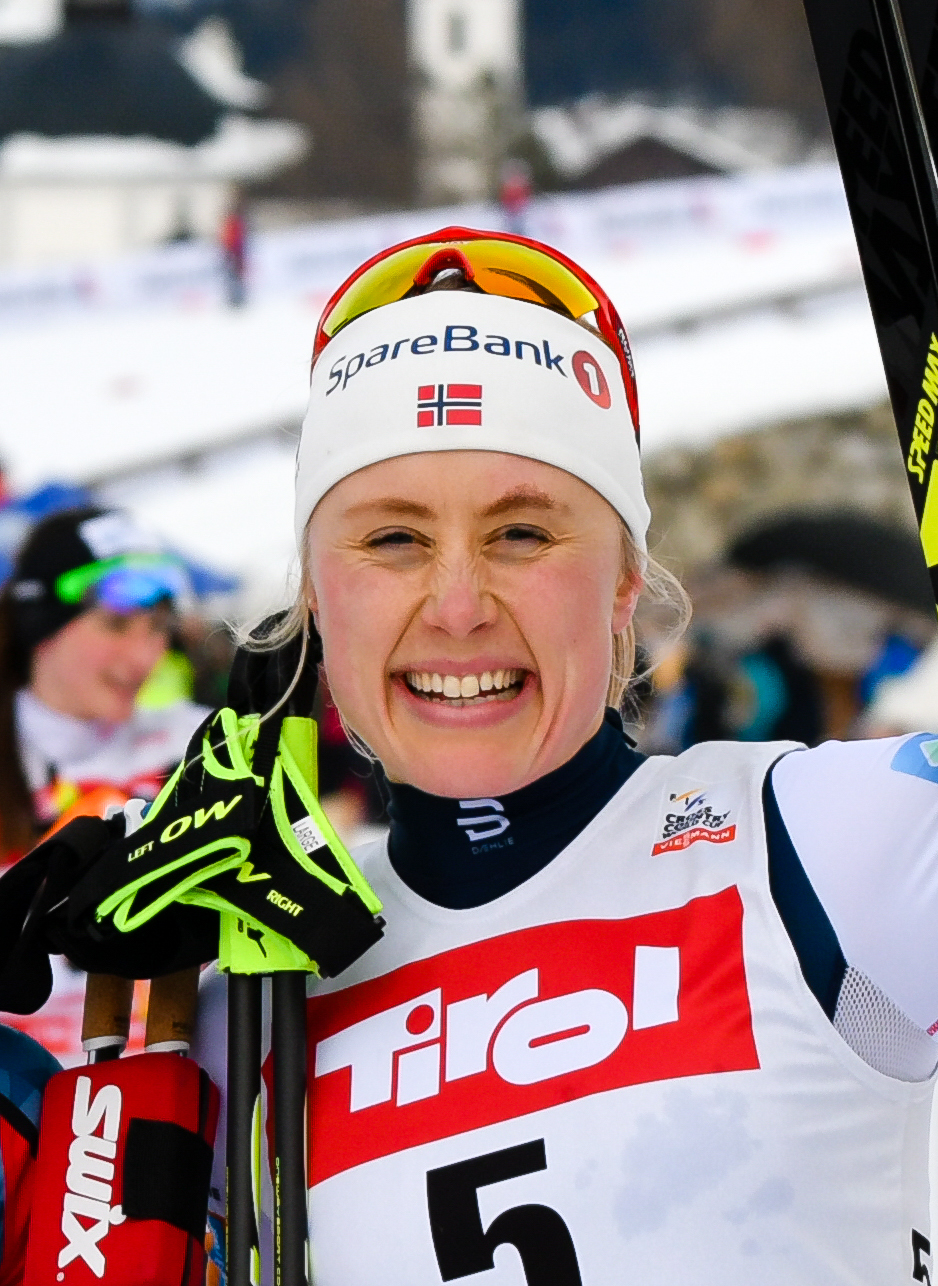
- Haga in Seefeld, January 2018

Personal information
- Full name: Ragnhild Gløersen Haga
- Nationality: Norway
- Born: 12 February 1991 (age 35) Holter, Nannestad, Norway
- Height: 172 cm (5 ft 8 in)

Sport
- Sport: Skiing
- Club: Åsen IL

World Cup career
- Seasons: 13 – (2010–2013, 2015–2023)
- Indiv. starts: 140
- Indiv. podiums: 11
- Indiv. wins: 2
- Team starts: 12
- Team podiums: 3
- Team wins: 2
- Overall titles: 0 – (5th in 2015)
- Discipline titles: 0
Medal record
Women's cross-country skiing
Representing Norway
Olympic Games
Gold medal – first place	2018 Pyeongchang	10 km freestyle
Gold medal – first place	2018 Pyeongchang	4 × 5 km relay
U23 World Championships
Gold medal – first place	2013 Liberec	10 km freestyle
Gold medal – first place	2013 Liberec	15 km skiathlon
Silver medal – second place	2014 Val di Fiemme	15 km skiathlon
Junior World Championships
Gold medal – first place	2011 Otepää	5 km freestyle
Gold medal – first place	2011 Otepää	4 × 3.33 km relay
Bronze medal – third place	2011 Otepää	Individual sprint

Ragnhild Gløersen Haga (born 12 February 1991) is a retired Norwegian Olympic champion cross-country skier.

== Career ==
Haga competed in the 2015 World Cup season, making a breakthrough by taking 12 top-ten World Cup results.

At the 2015 Tour de Ski, she finished fourth overall.

She represented Norway at the FIS Nordic World Ski Championships 2015 in Falun.

In May, 2021, she was dropped from the Norwegian National Cross-country Team.

On 12 March 2023, Haga made history by winning the first ever women's 50 km World Cup race, in Holmenkollen, Norway.

She announced her retirement from cross-country skiing on 30 March 2023.

== Personal life ==
Haga was born in Nannestad on 12 February 1991.

She is the niece of Anders Bakken, who competed in cross-country skiing at the 1980 Winter Olympics in Lake Placid. Her partner is Øyvind Gløersen.

== Cross-country skiing results ==
All results are sourced from the International Ski Federation (FIS).

=== Olympic Games ===
- 2 medals – (2 gold)

Year	Age	10 km individual	15 km skiathlon	30 km mass start	Sprint	4 × 5 km relay	Team sprint
2018	27	Gold	15	—	—	Gold	—
2022	31	—	29	28	—	5	—

=== World Championships ===
Year	Age	10 km individual	15 km skiathlon	30 km mass start	Sprint	4 × 5 km relay	Team sprint
2015	24	29	—	—	—	—	—
2017	26	—	—	4	—	—	—
2019	28	—	—	10	—	—	—
2021	30	7	—	—	—	—	—

=== World Cup ===
==== Season standings ====
Season	Age	Discipline standings			Ski Tour standings				
Season	Age	Overall	Distance	Sprint	Nordic Opening	Tour de Ski	Ski Tour 2020	World Cup Final	Ski Tour Canada
2010	19	NC	NC	—	—N/a	—	—N/a	—	—N/a
2011	20	108	73	NC	—	—	—N/a	—	—N/a
2012	21	NC	NC	NC	—	—	—N/a	—	—N/a
2013	22	78	57	NC	—	—	—N/a	29	—N/a
2015	24	5	5	32	6	4	—N/a	—N/a	—N/a
2016	25	13	10	25	12	6	—N/a	—N/a	DNF
2017	26	19	15	38	10	DNF	—N/a	12	—N/a
2018	27	9	8	NC	3rd place, bronze medalist(s)	—	—N/a	4	—N/a
2019	28	27	16	44	9	—	—N/a	—	—N/a
2020	29	19	16	37	28	17	13	—N/a	—N/a
2021	30	57	39	—	—	—	—N/a	—N/a	—N/a
2022	31	29	18	60	—N/a	17	—N/a	—N/a	—N/a
2023	32	52	28	—	—N/a	—	—N/a	—N/a	—N/a

==== Individual podiums ====
- 2 victories – (1WC, 1 SWC)
- 11 podiums – (7 WC, 4 SWC)

No.	Season	Date	Location	Race	Level	Place
1	2014–15	3 January 2015	Oberstdorf, Germany	3 km Individual F	Stage World Cup	3rd
2	2015–16	27 November 2015	Rukatunturi, Finland	1.4 km Sprint C	Stage World Cup	3rd
3	2017–18	26 November 2017	Rukatunturi, Finland	10 km Pursuit F	Stage World Cup	1st
4	2017–18	26 November 2017	(Finland) Nordic Opening	Overall Standings	World Cup	3rd
5	2017–18	3 December 2017	Lillehammer, Norway	7.5 km + 7.5 km Skiathlon C/F	World Cup	3rd
6	2017–18	10 December 2017	Davos, Switzerland	10 km Individual F	World Cup	2nd
7	2017–18	16 December 2017	Toblach, Italy	10 km Individual F	World Cup	2nd
8	2017–18	28 January 2018	Seefeld, Austria	10 km Mass Start F	World Cup	3rd
9	2017–18	28 January 2018	Oslo, Norway	30 km Mass Start F	World Cup	3rd
10	2017–18	18 March 2018	Falun, Sweden	10 km Pursuit F	Stage World Cup	2nd
11	2022–23	12 March 2023	Oslo, Norway	50 km Mass Start F	World Cup	1st

==== Team podiums ====
- 2 victories – (2 RL)
- 3 podiums – (3 RL)

No.	Season	Date	Location	Race	Level	Place	Teammates
1	2011–12	12 February 2012	Nové Město, Czech Republic	4 × 5 km Relay C/F	World Cup	3rd	Weng / Kristoffersen / Østberg
2	2016–17	18 December 2016	La Clusaz, France	4 × 5 km Relay C/F	World Cup	1st	Østberg / Bjørgen / Weng
3	2018–19	9 December 2018	Beitostølen, Norway	4 × 5 km Relay C/F	World Cup	1st	Weng / Johaug / Østberg
