= Hans Christer Holund =

Norwegian cross-country skier

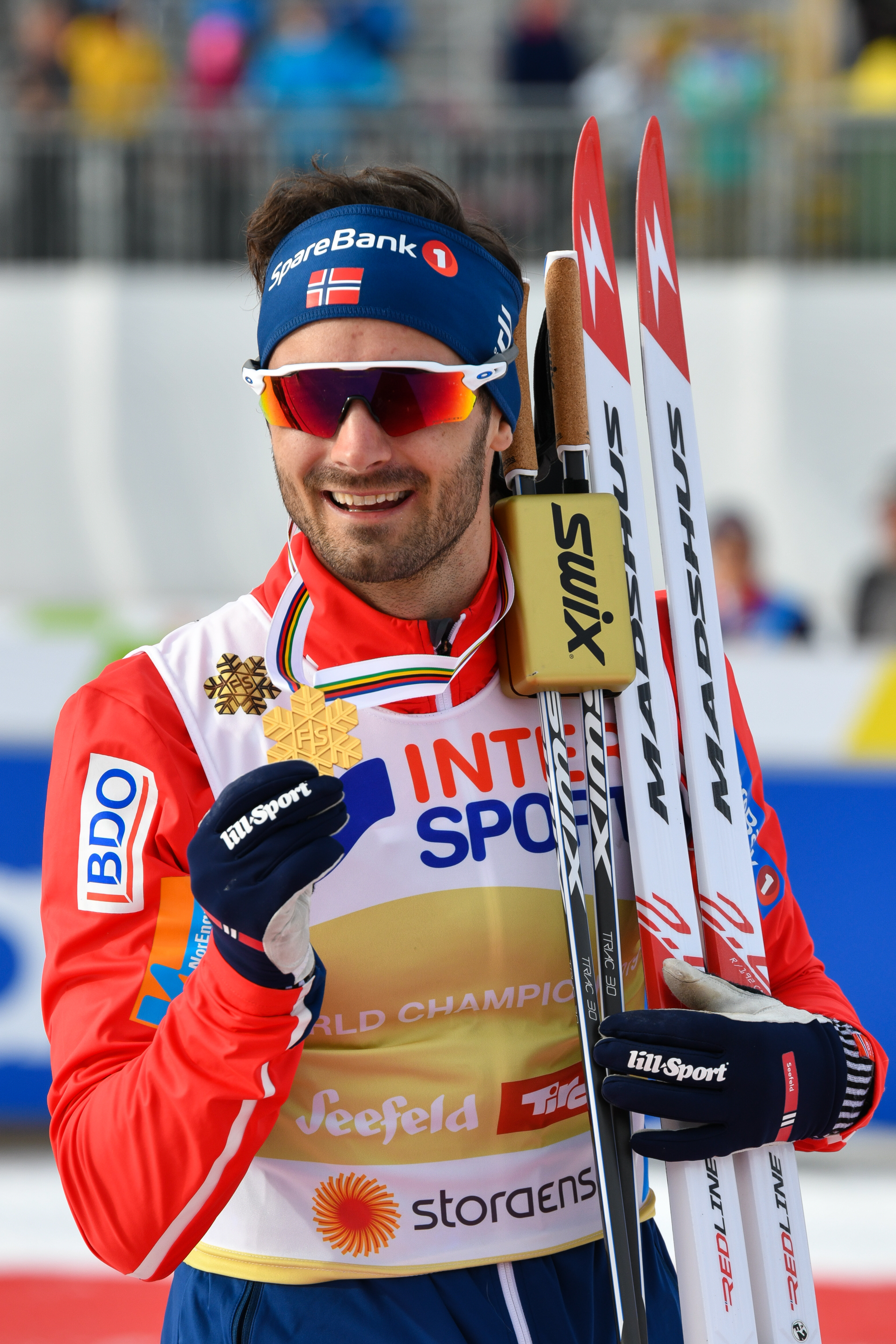
- Holund in 2019

Personal information
- Nationality: Norway
- Born: 25 February 1989 (age 37) Oslo, Norway
- Height: 1.82 m (6 ft 0 in)

Sport
- Sport: Skiing
- Club: SFK Lyn

World Cup career
- Seasons: 12 – (2009, 2013–2023)
- Indiv. starts: 145
- Indiv. podiums: 20
- Indiv. wins: 2
- Team starts: 8
- Team podiums: 7
- Team wins: 2
- Overall titles: 0 – (6th in 2018, 2023)
- Discipline titles: 0
Medal record
Men's cross-country skiing
Representing Norway
Olympic Games
Silver medal – second place	2022 Beijing	4 × 10 km relay
Bronze medal – third place	2018 Pyeongchang	30 km skiathlon
World Championships
Gold medal – first place	2019 Seefeld	50 km freestyle
Gold medal – first place	2021 Oberstdorf	15 km freestyle
Gold medal – first place	2021 Oberstdorf	4 × 10 km relay
Gold medal – first place	2023 Planica	4 × 10 km relay
Bronze medal – third place	2021 Oberstdorf	30 km skiathlon
Bronze medal – third place	2023 Planica	15 km freestyle
Junior World Championships
Gold medal – first place	2008 Mals	10 km classical
Bronze medal – third place	2009 Praz de Lys-Sommand	20 km pursuit
Bronze medal – third place	2009 Praz de Lys-Sommand	4 × 5 km relay
- Updated on 23 April 2023

Hans Christer Holund (born 25 February 1989) is a Norwegian cross-country skier who represents Lyn.

Holund won the 10 km classical at Junior World Championships in 2008, and debuted in the FIS Cross-Country World Cup in Lahti on 8 March 2009.

At the Norwegian National Championships in 2016, Holund was on the SFK Lyn team with Jonas Udjus Frorud and Simen Hegstad Krüger that won the 3 × 10 km relay.

Holund won the gold medal at the 2021 World Championship in Oberstdorf in 15 km freestyle individual.

== Cross-country skiing results ==
All results are sourced from the International Ski Federation (FIS).

=== Olympic Games ===
- 2 medals – (1 silver, 1 bronze)

Year	Age	15 km individual	30 km skiathlon	50 km mass start	Sprint	4 × 10 km relay	Team sprint
2018	29	6	Bronze	6	—	—	—
2022	33	4	4	13^{[a]}	—	Silver	—

^{a} Distance reduced to 30 km due to weather conditions.

=== World Championships ===
- 6 medals – (4 gold, 2 bronze)

Year	Age	15 km individual	30 km skiathlon	50 km mass start	Sprint	4 × 10 km relay	Team sprint
2017	28	—	—	10	—	—	—
2019	30	—	—	Gold	—	—	—
2021	32	Gold	Bronze	4	—	Gold	—
2023	34	Bronze	—	—	—	Gold	—

=== World Cup ===
==== Season standings ====
Season	Age	Discipline standings			Ski Tour standings				
Season	Age	Overall	Distance	Sprint	Nordic Opening	Tour de Ski	Ski Tour 2020	World Cup Final	Ski Tour Canada
2009	20	NC	NC	—	—N/a	—	—N/a	—	—N/a
2013	24	130	84	—	—	—	—N/a	—	—N/a
2014	25	NC	NC	—	—	—	—N/a	—	—N/a
2015	26	43	28	—	—	—	—N/a	—N/a	—N/a
2016	27	10	7	77	9	15	—N/a	—N/a	8
2017	28	12	10	NC	14	9	—N/a	15	—N/a
2018	29	6	3rd place, bronze medalist(s)	NC	9	5	—N/a	6	—N/a
2019	30	17	12	NC	13	12	—N/a	14	—N/a
2020	31	7	5	NC	6	DNF	3rd place, bronze medalist(s)	—N/a	—N/a
2021	32	14	7	NC	4	—	—N/a	—N/a	—N/a
2022	33	21	10	—	—N/a	—	—N/a	—N/a	—N/a
2023	34	6	5	NC	—N/a	3rd place, bronze medalist(s)	—N/a	—N/a	—N/a

==== Individual podiums ====
- 2 victories – (2 SWC)
- 20 podiums – (13 WC, 7 SWC)

No.	Season	Date	Location	Race	Level	Place
1	2015–16	5 December 2015	Lillehammer, Norway	15 km + 15 km Skiathlon C/F	World Cup	3rd
2	2015–16	21 February 2016	Lahti, Finland	15 km + 15 km Skiathlon C/F	World Cup	3rd
3	2016–17	8 January 2017	Val di Fiemme, Italy	9 km Pursuit F	Stage World Cup	3rd
4	2016–17	19 February 2017	Otepää, Estonia	15 km Individual C	World Cup	3rd
5	2017–18	26 November 2017	Rukatunturi, Finland	15 km Pursuit F	Stage World Cup	3rd
6	2017–18	3 December 2017	Lillehammer, Norway	15 km + 15 km Skiathlon C/F	World Cup	3rd
7	2017–18	18 March 2018	Falun, Sweden	15 km Pursuit F	Stage World Cup	2nd
8	2019–20	1 December 2019	Rukatunturi, Finland	15 km Pursuit F	Stage World Cup	1st
9	2019–20	7 December 2019	Lillehammer, Norway	15 km + 15 km Skiathlon C/F	World Cup	2nd
10	2019–20	23 February 2020	Trondheim, Norway	30 km Pursuit C	Stage World Cup	3rd
11	2019–20	15–23 February 2020	(Sweden) (Norway) FIS Ski Tour 2020	Overall Standings	World Cup	3rd
12	2019–20	29 February 2020	Lahti, Finland	15 km Individual C	World Cup	3rd
13	2020–21	29 November 2020	Rukatunturi, Finland	15 km Pursuit F	Stage World Cup	1st
14	2020–21	14 March 2021	Engadin, Switzerland	50 km Pursuit F	World Cup	2nd
15	2021–22	4 December 2021	Lillehammer, Norway	15 km Individual F	World Cup	2nd
16	2022–23	2 December 2022	Lillehammer, Norway	10 km Individual F	World Cup	3rd
17	2022–23	18 December 2022	Davos, Switzerland	20 km Individual F	World Cup	2nd
18	2022–23	8 January 2023	Val di Fiemme, Italy	10 km Mass Start F	Stage World Cup	2nd
19	2022–23	31 December 2022 – 8 January 2023	(Switzerland) (Germany) (Italy) Tour de Ski	Overall Standings	World Cup	3rd
20	2022–23	11 March 2023	Oslo, Norway	50 km Mass Start F	World Cup	2nd

==== Team podiums ====
- 2 victories – (2 RL)
- 7 podiums – (7 RL)

No.	Season	Date	Location	Race	Level	Place	Teammates
1	2015–16	6 December 2015	Lillehammer, Norway	4 × 7.5 km Relay C/F	World Cup	1st	Dyrhaug / Sundby / Northug
2	2018–19	9 December 2018	Beitostølen, Norway	4 × 7.5 km Relay C/F	World Cup	3rd	Tønseth / Haga / Krüger
3	2018–19	27 January 2019	Ulricehamn, Sweden	4 × 7.5 km Relay C/F	World Cup	3rd	Tønseth / Røthe / Krüger
4	2019–20	8 December 2019	Lillehammer, Norway	4 × 7.5 km Relay C/F	World Cup	3rd	Golberg / Røthe / Krogh
5	2019–20	1 March 2020	Lahti, Finland	4 × 7.5 km Relay C/F	World Cup	1st	Golberg / Røthe / Klæbo
6	2021–22	5 December 2021	Lillehammer, Norway	4 × 7.5 km Relay C/F	World Cup	3rd	Golberg / Nyenget / Amundsen
7	2021–22	13 March 2022	Falun, Sweden	4 × 5 km Mixed Relay F	World Cup	3rd	Weng / Tønseth / Johaug
