= FIS Nordic World Ski Championships 2025 – Men's sprint =

Men's sprint at the FIS Nordic World Ski Championships 2025
- Venue: Granåsen Ski Centre
- Location: Trondheim, Norway
- Dates: 27 February
- Competitors: 187 from 63 nations
- Winning time: 2:45.74

Medalists
| gold medal | Johannes Høsflot Klæbo | Norway |
| silver medal | Federico Pellegrino | Italy |
| bronze medal | Lauri Vuorinen | Finland |

The Men's sprint competition at the FIS Nordic World Ski Championships 2025 was held on 27 February 2025.

== Results ==
=== Qualification ===
The qualification was started at 10:52.

| Rank | Bib | Athlete | Country | Time | Deficit | Notes |
|---|---|---|---|---|---|---|
| 1 | 8 | Johannes Høsflot Klæbo | Norway | 2:36.32 | | Q |
| 2 | 4 | Edvin Anger | Sweden | 2:37.42 | +1.10 | Q |
| 3 | 6 | Valerio Grond | Switzerland | 2:38.28 | +1.96 | Q |
| 4 | 2 | Federico Pellegrino | Italy | 2:38.29 | +1.97 | Q |
| 5 | 10 | Ben Ogden | United States | 2:39.31 | +2.99 | Q |
| 6 | 20 | Lucas Chanavat | France | 2:39.85 | +3.53 | Q |
| 7 | 25 | Jan Stölben | Germany | 2:40.37 | +4.05 | Q |
| 8 | 19 | Jules Chappaz | France | 2:41.24 | +4.92 | Q |
| 9 | 12 | Lauri Vuorinen | Finland | 2:41.32 | +5.00 | Q |
| 10 | 30 | Ansgar Evensen | Norway | 2:41.35 | +5.03 | Q |
| 11 | 3 | Rémi Bourdin | France | 2:41.37 | +5.05 | Q |
| 12 | 7 | Emil Liekari | Finland | 2:41.65 | +5.33 | Q |
| 13 | 27 | Håvard Solås Taugbøl | Norway | 2:41.75 | +5.43 | Q |
| 14 | 5 | Matz William Jenssen | Norway | 2:41.75 | +5.43 | Q |
| 15 | 22 | Janik Riebli | Switzerland | 2:42.27 | +5.95 | Q |
| 16 | 18 | Even Northug | Norway | 2:42.57 | +6.25 | Q |
| 17 | 13 | Gus Schumacher | United States | 2:43.11 | +6.79 | Q |
| 18 | 34 | Wang Qiang | China | 2:43.26 | +6.94 | Q |
| 19 | 15 | Jack Young | United States | 2:43.99 | +7.67 | Q |
| 20 | 35 | Michal Novák | Czech Republic | 2:44.02 | +7.70 | Q |
| 21 | 14 | Emil Danielsson | Sweden | 2:44.24 | +7.92 | Q |
| 22 | 26 | JC Schoonmaker | United States | 2:44.27 | +7.95 | Q |
| 23 | 16 | Benjamin Moser | Austria | 2:44.74 | +8.42 | Q |
| 24 | 43 | Jiří Tuž | Czech Republic | 2:44.81 | +8.49 | Q |
| 25 | 24 | Richard Jouve | France | 2:45.08 | +8.76 | Q |
| 26 | 11 | Oskar Svensson | Sweden | 2:45.40 | +9.08 | Q |
| 27 | 9 | James Clugnet | United Kingdom | 2:45.76 | +9.44 | Q |
| 28 | 47 | Noé Näff | Switzerland | 2:45.78 | +9.46 | Q |
| 29 | 17 | Jaume Pueyo | Spain | 2:45.88 | +9.56 | Q |
| 30 | 29 | Ondřej Černý | Czech Republic | 2:45.92 | +9.60 | Q |
| 31 | 48 | Maciej Starega | Poland | 2:45.96 | +9.64 | |
| 32 | 42 | Elias Keck | Germany | 2:45.97 | +9.65 | |
| 33 | 55 | Lars Young Vik | Australia | 2:46.13 | +9.81 | |
| 34 | 28 | Niilo Moilanen | Finland | 2:46.21 | +9.89 | |
| 35 | 31 | Davide Graz | Italy | 2:46.43 | +10.11 | |
| 36 | 39 | Pierre Grall-Johnson | Canada | 2:46.45 | +10.13 | |
| 37 | 23 | Joni Mäki | Finland | 2:46.80 | +10.48 | |
| 37 | 21 | Marcus Grate | Sweden | 2:46.80 | +10.48 | |
| 39 | 36 | Miha Šimenc | Slovenia | 2:47.09 | +10.77 | |
| 40 | 46 | Roman Alder | Switzerland | 2:47.30 | +10.98 | |
| 41 | 1 | Marius Kastner | Germany | 2:47.39 | +11.07 | |
| 42 | 38 | Giovanni Ticco | Italy | 2:47.69 | +11.37 | |
| 43 | 33 | Nejc Štern | Slovenia | 2:47.84 | +11.52 | |
| 44 | 40 | Martino Carollo | Italy | 2:48.17 | +11.85 | |
| 45 | 37 | Michael Föttinger | Austria | 2:48.78 | +12.46 | |
| 46 | 32 | Ludek Seller | Czech Republic | 2:48.92 | +12.60 | |
| 47 | 57 | Raimo Vīgants | Latvia | 2:49.52 | +13.20 | |
| 48 | 89 | Graham Ritchie | Canada | 2:49.86 | +13.54 | |
| 49 | 61 | Dominik Bury | Poland | 2:50.30 | +13.98 | |
| 50 | 41 | Lauris Kaparkalējs | Latvia | 2:50.42 | +14.10 | |
| 51 | 44 | Xavier McKeever | Canada | 2:50.82 | +14.50 | |
| 52 | 58 | Karl Sebastian Dremljuga | Estonia | 2:50.87 | +14.55 | |
| 53 | 54 | Kamil Bury | Poland | 2:51.02 | +14.70 | |
| 54 | 49 | Sasha Masson | Canada | 2:51.08 | +14.76 | |
| 55 | 45 | Vili Črv | Slovenia | 2:51.15 | +14.83 | |
| 56 | 59 | Henri Roos | Estonia | 2:51.49 | +15.17 | |
| 57 | 107 | Sebastian Santiago Kildebo | Colombia | 2:51.74 | +15.42 | |
| 58 | 80 | Dmytro Drahun | Ukraine | 2:51.77 | +15.45 | |
| 59 | 92 | Modestas Vaičiulis | Lithuania | 2:51.87 | +15.55 | |
| 60 | 76 | Franco Dal Farra | Argentina | 2:51.74 | +15.65 | |
| 61 | 82 | Jáchym Cenek | Slovakia | 2:51.97 | +15.87 | |
| 62 | 60 | Svyatoslav Matassov | Kazakhstan | 2:52.19 | +15.98 | |
| 63 | 66 | Phillip Bellingham | Australia | 2:52.30 | +16.26 | |
| 64 | 70 | Piotr Jarecki | Poland | 2:52.58 | +16.39 | |
| 65 | 68 | Bentley Walker-Broose | Australia | 2:53.51 | +17.19 | |
| 66 | 67 | Marc Colell Pantebre | Spain | 2:53.76 | +17.44 | |
| 67 | 56 | Bernat Selles Gasch | Spain | 2:53.97 | +17.65 | |
| 68 | 51 | Martin Himma | Estonia | 2:54.11 | +17.79 | |
| 69 | 97 | Stevenson Savart | Haiti | 2:54.28 | +17.96 | |
| 70 | 53 | Anže Gros | Slovenia | 2:54.33 | +18.01 | |
| 71 | 71 | Marko Skender | Croatia | 2:54.63 | +18.31 | |
| 72 | 72 | Ralf Kivil | Estonia | 2:54.81 | +18.49 | |
| 73 | 79 | Konstantin Bortsov | Kazakhstan | 2:54.98 | +18.66 | |
| 74 | 65 | Niks Saulītis | Latvia | 2:55.12 | +18.80 | |
| 75 | 63 | Mark Chanloung | Thailand | 2:55.23 | +18.91 | |
| 76 | 85 | Gabriel Cojocaru | Romania | 2:55.48 | +19.16 | |
| 77 | 142 | Strahinja Erić | Bosnia and Herzegovina | 2:55.50 | +19.18 | |
| 78 | 75 | Silvestrs Švauksts | Latvia | 2:55.77 | +19.45 | |
| 79 | 64 | Oleksandr Lisohor | Ukraine | 2:55.99 | +19.67 | |
| 80 | 104 | Abdullah Yılmaz | Turkey | 2:56.70 | +20.38 | |
| 81 | 62 | Yernar Nursbekov | Kazakhstan | 2:56.86 | +20.54 | |
| 82 | 95 | Tautvydas Strolia | Lithuania | 2:57.24 | +20.92 | |
| 83 | 88 | Mario Matikanov | Bulgaria | 2:57.31 | +20.99 | |
| 84 | 83 | Denis Tilesch | Slovakia | 2:57.70 | +21.38 | |
| 85 | 93 | Magnus Tobiassen | Denmark | 2:57.76 | +21.44 | |
| 86 | 73 | Manex Silva | Brazil | 2:58.42 | +22.10 | |
| 87 | 101 | Denys Muhotinov | Ukraine | 2:58.79 | +22.47 | |
| 88 | 69 | Olzhas Klimin | Kazakhstan | 2:59.03 | +22.71 | |
| 89 | 90 | Sebastian Endrestad | Chile | 2:59.83 | +23.51 | |
| 90 | 86 | Andrej Renda | Slovakia | 2:59.97 | +23.65 | |
| 91 | 81 | Paul Pepene | Romania | 3:00.00 | +23.68 | |
| 92 | 94 | Fredrik Fodstad | Colombia | 3:00.11 | +23.79 | |
| 93 | 96 | Daniel Peshkov | Bulgaria | 3:00.48 | +24.16 | |
| 94 | 77 | Dagur Benediktsson | Iceland | 3:00.62 | +24.30 | |
| 95 | 103 | Batmönkhiin Achbadrakh | Mongolia | 3:01.19 | +24.87 | |
| 96 | 91 | Mathis Poutot | Belgium | 3:01.71 | +25.39 | |
| 97 | 102 | Jan Adamov | Slovakia | 3:01.90 | +25.58 | |
| 98 | 78 | Florin Robert Dolhascu | Romania | 3:02.04 | +25.72 | |
| 99 | 108 | Ionut Alexandru Costea | Romania | 3:02.22 | +25.90 | |
| 100 | 135 | Nikolaos Tsourekas | Greece | 3:02.65 | +26.33 | |
| 101 | 128 | Khuslen Ariunjargal | Mongolia | 3:03.05 | +26.73 | |
| 102 | 87 | Fedele de Campo | Argentina | 3:03.12 | +26.80 | |
| 103 | 74 | Ádám Kónya | Hungary | 3:03.14 | +26.82 | |
| 104 | 98 | Samuel Ikpefan | Nigeria | 3:03.22 | +26.90 | |
| 105 | 121 | Liu Rongsheng | China | 3:03.44 | +27.12 | |
| 106 | 106 | Miloš Milosavljević | Serbia | 3:04.39 | +28.07 | |
| 107 | 110 | Ruslan Denysenko | Ukraine | 3:04.68 | +28.36 | |
| 108 | 84 | Aleksandar Grbović | Montenegro | 3:04.81 | +28.49 | |
| 109 | 123 | Lee Joon-seo | South Korea | 3:05.98 | +29.66 | |
| 110 | 99 | Mateo Lorenzo Sauma | Argentina | 3:06.16 | +29.84 | |
| 111 | 113 | Frode Hymer | Iceland | 3:06.23 | +29.91 | |
| 112 | 117 | Einar Árni Gíslason | Iceland | 3:06.68 | +30.36 | |
| 113 | 100 | Martin Flores | Chile | 3:06.72 | +30.40 | |
| 114 | 126 | Daujotas Jonikas | Lithuania | 3:06.96 | +30.64 | |
| 115 | 115 | Ástmar Helgi Kristinsson | Iceland | 3:07.34 | +31.02 | |
| 116 | 140 | Apostolos Angelis | Greece | 3:09.01 | +32.69 | |
| 117 | 105 | Matas Gražys | Lithuania | 3:09.09 | +32.77 | |
| 118 | 181 | Srdjan Lalović | Bosnia and Herzegovina | 3:09.86 | +33.54 | |
| 119 | 139 | Amed Oglago | Turkey | 3:10.09 | +33.77 | |
| 120 | 131 | Andrija Tošić | Serbia | 3:10.72 | +34.40 | |
| 121 | 109 | Rhaick Bomfim | Brazil | 3:11.35 | +35.03 | |
| 122 | 118 | Zolbayar Otgonlkhagva | Mongolia | 3:11.89 | +35.57 | |
| 123 | 120 | Matija Štimac | Croatia | 3:12.10 | +35.78 | |
| 124 | 111 | Victor Santos | Brazil | 3:12.66 | +36.34 | |
| 125 | 159 | Artur Saparbekov | Kyrgyzstan | 3:12.78 | +36.46 | |
| 126 | 129 | Stavre Jada | North Macedonia | 3:13.56 | +37.24 | |
| 127 | 52 | Lukas Mrkonjic | Austria | 3:14.63 | +38.31 | |
| 128 | 187 | Boris Stanojević | Bosnia and Herzegovina | 3:15.08 | +38.76 | |
| 129 | 141 | Ivano Pelko | Croatia | 3:15.34 | +39.02 | |
| 130 | 145 | Eldar Kadyrov | Kyrgyzstan | 3:16.17 | +39.85 | |
| 131 | 177 | Joachim Weel Rosbo | Norway | 3:16.44 | +40.12 | |
| 132 | 132 | Shubam Parihar | India | 3:17.11 | +40.79 | |
| 133 | 124 | Thanakorn Ngoeichai | Thailand | 3:19.27 | +42.95 | |
| 134 | 122 | Yonathan Jesús Fernández | Chile | 3:20.09 | +43.77 | |
| 135 | 127 | Boris Štefančič | Croatia | 3:20.57 | +44.25 | |
| 136 | 146 | Ioannis Karamichos | Greece | 3:20.76 | +44.44 | |
| 137 | 182 | Musa Rakhmanberdi Uulu | Kyrgyzstan | 3:21.72 | +45.40 | |
| 138 | 133 | Csongor Ferbár | Hungary | 3:21.77 | +45.45 | |
| 139 | 156 | Danyal Saveh Shemshaki | Iran | 3:22.37 | +46.05 | |
| 140 | 125 | Timo Juhani Grönlund | Bolivia | 3:23.31 | +46.99 | |
| 141 | 130 | Theo Mallet | Haiti | 3:23.74 | +47.42 | |
| 142 | 119 | Guilherme Pereira Santos | Brazil | 3:23.77 | +47.42 | |
| 143 | 137 | Sigurd Herrera | Chile | 3:24.17 | +47.85 | |
| 144 | 158 | Panagiotis Papasis | Greece | 3:24.39 | +48.07 | |
| 145 | 172 | Rejhan Smrković | Serbia | 3:24.44 | +48.12 | |
| 146 | 147 | Emil Kristensen | Denmark | 3:25.78 | +49.46 | |
| 147 | 183 | Petar Klacar | Bosnia and Herzegovina | 3:26.98 | +50.66 | |
| 148 | 176 | Darko Damjanovski | North Macedonia | 3:27.32 | +51.00 | |
| 149 | 148 | Thanatip Bunrit | Thailand | 3:27.70 | +51.38 | |
| 150 | 136 | José Cabeça | Portugal | 3:27.77 | +51.45 | |
| 151 | 134 | Stanzin Lundup | India | 3:28.42 | +52.10 | |
| 152 | 138 | Samer Tawk | Lebanon | 3:31.01 | +54.69 | |
| 153 | 144 | Dylan Longridge | Ireland | 3:31.57 | +55.25 | |
| 154 | 143 | Padma Namgail | India | 3:31.75 | +55.43 | |
| 155 | 169 | Alireza Moghdid | Iran | 3:32.07 | +55.75 | |
| 156 | 166 | Mahdi Tir | Iran | 3:32.46 | +56.14 | |
| 157 | 161 | Allan Corona | Mexico | 3:33.52 | +57.20 | |
| 158 | 167 | Seyed Ahmad Reza Seyd | Iran | 3:33.68 | +57.36 | |
| 159 | 152 | Lee Chieh-han | Chinese Taipei | 3:34.10 | +57.78 | |
| 160 | 154 | Seyed Ahmad Reza Seyd | Iran | 3:36.17 | +59.85 | |
| 161 | 186 | Rafael Lundblad Toermae | Colombia | 3:39.84 | +1:03.52 | |
| 162 | 153 | Rakan Alireza | Saudi Arabia | 3:40.11 | +1:03.79 | |
| 163 | 180 | Jaime Luis Huerta | Peru | 3:41.96 | +1:05.64 | |
| 164 | 184 | Đorđe Paunović | Serbia | 3:46.97 | +1:10.65 | |
| 165 | 151 | Paul Keyrouz | Lebanon | 3:47.47 | +1:11.15 | |
| 166 | 162 | Elie Tawk | Lebanon | 3:47.91 | +1:11.59 | |
| 167 | 174 | Viktor Chakarovski | North Macedonia | 3:47.93 | +1:11.61 | |
| 168 | 168 | Matthew Smith | South Africa | 3:48.16 | +1:11.84 | |
| 169 | 160 | Marcelino Tawk | Lebanon | 3:50.70 | +1:14.38 | |
| 170 | 155 | Simon Sancet | San Marino | 3:54.20 | +1:17.88 | |
| 171 | 164 | Antonio Pineyro | Mexico | 3:57.61 | +1:21.29 | |
| 172 | 185 | Zolbayar Tserendendev | Mongolia | 3:57.82 | +1:21.50 | |
| 173 | 157 | Attila Kertesz | Israel | 3:57.94 | +1:21.62 | |
| 174 | 163 | Pedro Montes de Oca | Mexico | 3:58.91 | +1:22.59 | |
| 175 | 149 | Juan Carlos Ayala | Mexico | 4:00.36 | +1:24.04 | |
| 176 | 171 | Victor Domingo Olsgard | Peru | 4:01.32 | +1:25.00 | |
| 177 | 150 | Klaus Jungbluth | Ecuador | 4:03.41 | +1:27.09 | |
| 178 | 178 | Guillermo Racero | Venezuela | 4:05.36 | +1:29.04 | |
| 179 | 165 | Eduardo Arteaga | Venezuela | 4:09.31 | +1:32.99 | |
| 180 | 179 | Filipe Cabrita | Portugal | 4:24.82 | +1:48.50 | |
| 181 | 173 | Nicholas Lau | Trinidad and Tobago | 4:39.58 | +2:03.26 | |
| 182 | 170 | Frederick Crosetto | Malta | 5:14.11 | +2:37.79 | |

=== Quarterfinals ===
The top two of each heat and the two best-timed skiers advanced to the semifinals.

==== Quarterfinal 1 ====
| Rank | Seed | Athlete | Country | Time | Deficit | Notes |
|---|---|---|---|---|---|---|
| 1 | 1 | Johannes Høsflot Klæbo | Norway | 2:45.43 | | Q |
| 2 | 25 | Richard Jouve | France | 2:45.55 | +0.12 | Q |
| 3 | 6 | Lucas Chanavat | France | 2:45.66 | +0.23 | LL |
| 4 | 28 | Noé Näff | Switzerland | 2:47.06 | +1.63 | |
| 5 | 26 | Oskar Svensson | Sweden | 2:48.45 | +3.02 | |
| 6 | 24 | Jiří Tuž | Czech Republic | 2:49.11 | +3.68 | |

==== Quarterfinal 2 ====
| Rank | Seed | Athlete | Country | Time | Deficit | Notes |
|---|---|---|---|---|---|---|
| 1 | 4 | Federico Pellegrino | Italy | 2:46.82 | | Q |
| 2 | 10 | Ansgar Evensen | Norway | 2:47.00 | +0.18 | Q |
| 3 | 2 | Edvin Anger | Sweden | 2:47.05 | +0.23 | LL |
| 4 | 27 | James Clugnet | Great Britain | 2:48.01 | +1.19 | |
| 5 | 30 | Ondřej Černý | Czech Republic | 2:52.28 | +5.46 | |
| 6 | 29 | Jaume Pueyo | Spain | 2:52.84 | +6.02 | |

==== Quarterfinal 3 ====
| Rank | Seed | Athlete | Country | Time | Deficit | Notes |
|---|---|---|---|---|---|---|
| 1 | 16 | Even Northug | Norway | 2:47.84 | | Q |
| 2 | 5 | Ben Ogden | United States | 2:48.06 | +0.22 | Q |
| 3 | 11 | Rémi Bourdin | France | 2:48.12 | +0.28 | |
| 4 | 12 | Emil Liekari | Finland | 2:48.92 | +1.08 | |
| 5 | 21 | Emil Danielsson | Sweden | 2:49.79 | +1.95 | |
| 6 | 17 | Gus Schumacher | United States | 2:50.05 | +2.21 | |

==== Quarterfinal 4 ====
| Rank | Seed | Athlete | Country | Time | Deficit | Notes |
|---|---|---|---|---|---|---|
| 1 | 8 | Jules Chappaz | France | 2:46.71 | | Q |
| 2 | 3 | Valerio Grond | Switzerland | 2:46.86 | +0.15 | Q |
| 3 | 22 | JC Schoonmaker | United States | 2:47.55 | +0.84 | |
| 4 | 19 | Jack Young | United States | 2:48.85 | +2.14 | |
| 5 | 14 | Matz William Jenssen | Norway | 2:55.29 | +8.58 | |
| 6 | 23 | Benjamin Moser | Austria | 3:14.17 | +27.46 | |

==== Quarterfinal 5 ====
| Rank | Seed | Athlete | Country | Time | Deficit | Notes |
|---|---|---|---|---|---|---|
| 1 | 9 | Lauri Vuorinen | Finland | 2:46.68 | | Q |
| 2 | 20 | Michal Novák | Czech Republic | 2:47.31 | +0.63 | Q |
| 3 | 13 | Håvard Solås Taugbøl | Norway | 2:47.79 | +1.11 | |
| 4 | 18 | Wang Qiang | China | 2:48.42 | +1.74 | |
| 5 | 7 | Jan Stölben | Germany | 3:01.58 | +14.90 | |
| 6 | 15 | Janik Riebli | Switzerland | 3:06.58 | +19.90 | |

=== Semifinals ===
The top two of each heat and the two best-timed skiers advanced to the semifinals.

==== Semifinal 1 ====
| Rank | Seed | Athlete | Country | Time | Deficit | Notes |
|---|---|---|---|---|---|---|
| 1 | 1 | Johannes Høsflot Klæbo | Norway | 2:50.05 | | Q |
| 2 | 4 | Federico Pellegrino | Italy | 2:50.18 | +0.13 | Q |
| 3 | 10 | Ansgar Evensen | Norway | 2:50.92 | +0.87 | |
| 4 | 25 | Richard Jouve | France | 2:50.97 | +0.92 | |
| 5 | 16 | Even Northug | Norway | 2:51.18 | +1.13 | |
| 6 | 2 | Edvin Anger | Sweden | 2:52.38 | +2.33 | |

==== Semifinal 2 ====
| Rank | Seed | Athlete | Country | Time | Deficit | Notes |
|---|---|---|---|---|---|---|
| 1 | 9 | Lauri Vuorinen | Finland | 2:47.98 | | Q |
| 2 | 6 | Lucas Chanavat | France | 2:48.74 | +0.76 | Q |
| 3 | 8 | Jules Chappaz | France | 2:48.91 | +0.93 | LL |
| 4 | 20 | Michal Novák | Czech Republic | 2:49.27 | +1.29 | LL |
| 5 | 3 | Valerio Grond | Switzerland | 2:49.32 | +1.34 | |
| 6 | 5 | Ben Ogden | United States | 2:49.68 | +1.70 | |

=== Final ===
| Rank | Seed | Athlete | Country | Time | Deficit | Notes |
|---|---|---|---|---|---|---|
| 1st place, gold medalist(s) | 1 | Johannes Høsflot Klæbo | Norway | 2:45.74 | | |
| 2nd place, silver medalist(s) | 4 | Federico Pellegrino | Italy | 2:46.41 | +0.67 | |
| 3rd place, bronze medalist(s) | 9 | Lauri Vuorinen | Finland | 2:50.53 | +4.79 | |
| 4 | 8 | Jules Chappaz | France | 2:50.73 | +4.99 | |
| 5 | 20 | Michal Novák | Czech Republic | 2:51.81 | +6.07 | |
| 6 | 6 | Lucas Chanavat | France | 3:09.79 | +24.05 | |
