= Iivo Niskanen =

Finnish cross-country skier (born 1992)

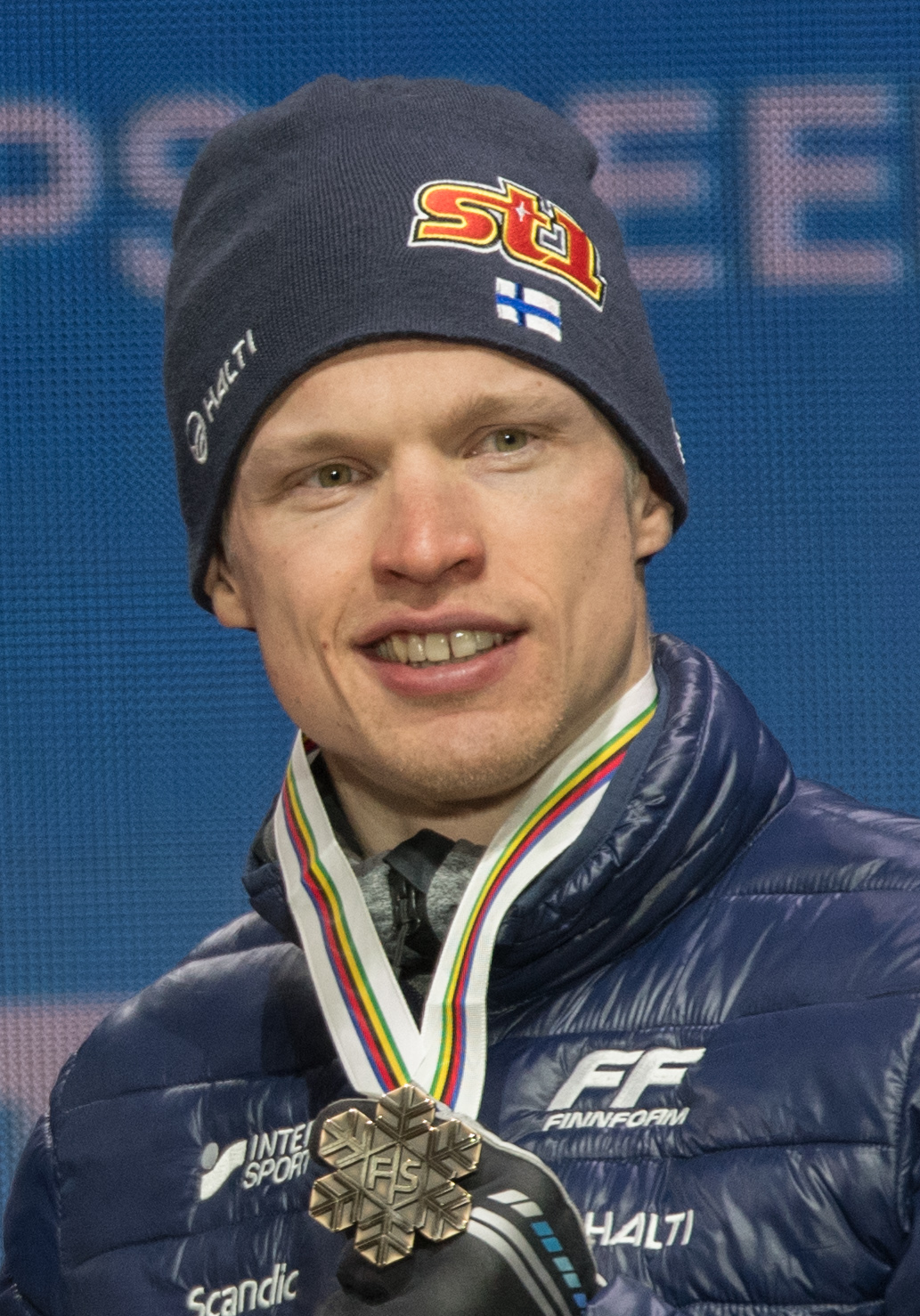
- Iivo Niskanen in February 2019

Personal information
- Full name: Iivo Henrik Niskanen
- Nationality: Finland
- Born: 12 January 1992 (age 34) Oulu, Finland
- Height: 1.87 m (6 ft 2 in)

Sport
- Sport: Skiing
- Club: Puijon Hiihtoseura

World Cup career
- Seasons: 15 – (2011–present)
- Indiv. starts: 143
- Indiv. podiums: 26
- Indiv. wins: 10
- Team starts: 14
- Team podiums: 4
- Team wins: 0
- Overall titles: 0 – (3rd in 2022)
- Discipline titles: 1 – (DI in 2022)
Medal record
Men's cross-country skiing
Representing Finland
Event	1st	2nd	3rd
Olympic Games	3	1	1
World Championships	1	1	2
Total	4	2	3
Olympic Games
Gold medal – first place	2014 Sochi	Team sprint
Gold medal – first place	2018 Pyeongchang	50 km classical
Gold medal – first place	2022 Beijing	15 km classical
Silver medal – second place	2022 Beijing	Team sprint
Bronze medal – third place	2022 Beijing	30 km skiathlon
World Championships
Gold medal – first place	2017 Lahti	15 km classical
Silver medal – second place	2023 Planica	4 × 10 km relay
Bronze medal – third place	2017 Lahti	Team sprint
Bronze medal – third place	2019 Seefeld	15 km classical
U23 World Championships
Gold medal – first place	2014 Val di Fiemme	15 km classical
Junior World Championships
Bronze medal – third place	2011 Otepää	4 × 5 km relay
- Updated on 15 December 2024

Iivo Henrik Niskanen (born 12 January 1992) is a Finnish cross-country skier who has competed in the FIS Cross-Country World Cup since 2011. He is a three-time Olympic champion.

== Career ==
Iivo Niskanen made his individual World Cup debut on 12 March 2011, when he finished 69th in a 20 km skiathlon in Lahti, Finland. He had his breakthrough at the international level when he won the 15-kilometre classic race at the 2014 under-23 World Championships in Val di Fiemme on 30 January 2014. He won the race with a 17.4 seconds margin to Russia's Sergey Ustiugov. Only three days after winning that gold medal, he finished 8th in a 15 km classic World Cup race in Toblach, Italy.

He won the gold medal in men's team sprint at the 2014 Winter Olympics with Sami Jauhojärvi. Following the pair's achievement, Niskanen and Jauhojärvi shared the Finnish Sports Personality of the Year award in 2014. Niskanen finished 4th on the prestigious 50 km race in Holmenkollen on 8 March 2014.

In the following 2014–15 season, Niskanen won his first World Cup victory on 30 November 2014 by winning a 15 km classic race on home soil in Ruka, Finland.

At the 2017 World Championships in Lahti, Niskanen won a bronze medal in the team sprint together with teammate Jauhojärvi. Niskanen led the race into its final stages, but a crash with Norway's Emil Iversen saw Russian and Italian skiers surpass them. On 1 March, he became the world champion on the 15 km classic event, winning the gold medal 17.9 seconds ahead of Norway's Martin Johnsrud Sundby. He won his second Finnish Sports Personality of the Year in 2017.

In the 2018 Winter Olympics in Pyeongchang, Niskanen became individual Olympic champion in the men's 50 kilometre classical. In January 2019, Niskanen was awarded his third Finnish Sports Personality of the Year for the year 2018, the first since Marjo Matikainen in 1987 to win the award two consecutive years; the first male since Kaarlo Kangasniemi in 1969.

At the 2019 World Championships in Seefeld in Tirol, Austria, Niskanen won a bronze medal in the 15 km classic event. This turned out to be his only medal at the championships as he finished fourth in both the skiathlon and the relay.

Iivo Niskanen started the 2019–20 season with his third 15 km classic World Cup win in Ruka and third place in the overall 2019 Nordic Opening. He reached the podium four more times during the season, including his first 15 km freestyle podium.

The 2020–21 season was something of a disappointment for Niskanen, who was left without any podium placements. In the WCH in Oberstdorf, he was in his season's best form, skiing a very strong 2nd leg in the relay and placing 6th in the 50 km classic, which he had won in the Winter Olympics three years earlier. However, missing out on a medal and a waxing failure in the 50-kilometre race enraged the ambitious skier.

In the 2021–22 season, Niskanen returned in stronger form and became the first Finnish male skier to reach the podium at the overall Tour de Ski, when he placed third. During the World Cup season, he took three wins and a second place, all in 15 km classical. By placing fourth in the 50 km race in Holmenkollen in the absence of his closest rivals Alexander Bolshunov and Johannes Høsflot Klæbo, he secured himself the Distance discipline globe already before the World Cup finals in Falun. Niskanen is the first Finnish male skier to win the Distance World Cup.

The 2022 Winter Olympics in Beijing were a triumph for Niskanen, who won his third Olympic gold with a dominant performance in the 15 km classical and claimed a somewhat unexpected bronze medal in the 30 km skiathlon. Alongside these individual medals, Niskanen won silver in the classical team sprint with Joni Mäki, thus winning three medals total in Beijing. Niskanen has medaled in all three Olympics he has participated in. He is the fourth Finn to win three Olympic gold medals in cross-country skiing, the first to do so since Marja-Liisa Kirvesniemi's triple gold in Sarajevo 1984. He is also one of four Finnish athletes who have won gold in three different Olympics, summer or winter, after Paavo Nurmi, Veikko Hakulinen and Pertti Karppinen.

== Cross-country skiing results ==
All results are sourced from the International Ski Federation (FIS).

=== Olympic Games ===
- 5 medals – (3 gold, 1 silver, 1 bronze)

Year	Age	10/15 km individual	20/30 km skiathlon	50 km mass start	Sprint	4 × 7.5/10 km relay	Team sprint
2014	22	4	25	10	—	6	Gold
2018	26	—	19	Gold	14	4	—
2022	30	Gold	Bronze	—^{[a]}	—	6	Silver
2026	34	—	17	DNF	—	4	—

^{a} Distance reduced to 30 km due to weather conditions.

=== World Championships ===
- 4 medals – (1 gold, 1 silver, 2 bronze)

Year	Age	10/15 km individual	20/30 km skiathlon	50 km mass start	Sprint	4 × 7.5/10 km relay	Team sprint
2015	23	—	26	—	—	8	—
2017	25	Gold	—	—	—	5	Bronze
2019	27	Bronze	4	—	—	4	7
2021	29	18	13	6	—	6	—
2023	31	—	13	6	—	Silver	—

=== World Cup ===
==== Season titles ====
- 1 title – (1 distance)

Season	Discipline
2022	Distance

==== Season standings ====
Season	Age	Discipline standings			Ski Tour standings				
Season	Age	Overall	Distance	Sprint	Nordic Opening	Tour de Ski	Ski Tour 2020	World Cup Final	Ski Tour Canada
2011	19	NC	NC	NC	—	—	—N/a	—	—N/a
2012	20	NC	—	NC	—	—	—N/a	—	—N/a
2013	21	NC	NC	NC	40	DNF	—N/a	—	—N/a
2014	22	50	31	90	—	—	—N/a	DNF	—N/a
2015	23	40	25	78	—	DNF	—N/a	—N/a	—N/a
2016	24	66	43	73	27	DNF	—N/a	—N/a	—
2017	25	14	4	42	10	DNF	—N/a	DNF	—N/a
2018	26	15	13	24	6	DNF	—N/a	DNF	—N/a
2019	27	20	13	92	7	—	—N/a	—	—N/a
2020	28	6	3rd place, bronze medalist(s)	31	3rd place, bronze medalist(s)	10	8	—N/a	—N/a
2021	29	23	19	84	5	—	—N/a	—N/a	—N/a
2022	30	3rd place, bronze medalist(s)	1st place, gold medalist(s)	73	—N/a	3rd place, bronze medalist(s)	—N/a	—N/a	—N/a
2023	31	63	33	NC	—N/a	DNF	—N/a	—N/a	—N/a
2024	32	29	15	55	—N/a	—	—N/a	—N/a	—N/a
2025	33	16	7	NC	—N/a	—	—N/a	—N/a	—N/a
2026	34	43	21	NC	—N/a	—	—N/a	—N/a	—N/a

==== Individual podiums ====
- 10 victories – (8 WC, 2 SWC)
- 27 podiums – (21 WC, 6 SWC)

No.	Season	Date	Location	Race	Level	Place
1	2014–15	30 November 2014	Rukatunturi, Finland	15 km Individual C	World Cup	1st
2	2016–17	27 November 2016	Rukatunturi, Finland	15 km Individual C	World Cup	1st
3	2016–17	19 February 2017	Otepää, Estonia	15 km Individual C	World Cup	2nd
4	2016–17	11 March 2017	Holmenkollen, Norway	50 km Mass Start C	World Cup	2nd
5	2017–18	25 November 2017	Rukatunturi, Finland	15 km Individual C	Stage World Cup	3rd
6	2017–18	4 March 2018	Lahti, Finland	15 km Individual C	World Cup	2nd
7	2018–19	20 January 2019	Otepää, Estonia	15 km Individual C	World Cup	1st
8	2018–19	17 February 2019	Cogne, Italy	15 km Individual C	World Cup	2nd
9	2019–20	30 November 2019	Rukatunturi, Finland	15 km Individual C	Stage World Cup	1st
10	2019–20	29 November – 1 December 2019	Nordic Opening, Finland	Overall Standings	World Cup	3rd
11	2019–20	1 January 2020	Toblach, Italy	15 km Pursuit C	Stage World Cup	3rd
12	2019–20	18 January 2020	Nové Město, Czech Republic	15 km Individual F	World Cup	2nd
13	2019–20	23 February 2020	Trondheim, Norway	30 km Pursuit C	Stage World Cup	2nd
14	2019–20	29 February 2020	Lahti, Finland	15 km Individual C	World Cup	1st
15	2021–22	27 November 2021	Rukatunturi, Finland	15 km Individual C	World Cup	1st
16	2021–22	29 December 2021	Lenzerheide, Switzerland	15 km Individual C	Stage World Cup	1st
17	2021–22	3 January 2022	Val di Fiemme, Italy	15 km Mass Start C	Stage World Cup	2nd
18	2021–22	28 December 2021 – 4 January 2022	(Switzerland) (Germany) (Italy) Tour de Ski	Overall Standings	World Cup	3rd
19	2021–22	27 February 2022	Lahti, Finland	15 km Individual C	World Cup	1st
20	2022–23	29 January 2023	Les Rousses, France	20 km Mass Start C	World Cup	2nd
21	2023–24	25 November 2023	Rukatunturi, Finland	10 km Individual C	World Cup	2nd
22	2023–24	2 March 2024	Lahti, Finland	20 km Individual C	World Cup	2nd
23	2023–24	16 March 2024	Falun, Sweden	10 km Individual C	World Cup	2nd
24	2024–25	29 November 2024	Rukatunturi, Finland	10 km Individual C	World Cup	1st
25	2024–25	15 December 2024	Davos, Switzerland	20 km Individual C	World Cup	2nd
26	2024–25	19 January 2025	Les Rousses, France	20 km Mass Start C	World Cup	2nd
27	2024–25	15 February 2025	Falun, Sweden	10 km Individual C	World Cup	1st
28	2025–26	18 January 2026	Oberhof, Germany	10 km Individual C	World Cup	2nd

==== Team podiums ====
- 4 podiums – (2 RL, 2 TS)

No.	Season	Date	Location	Race	Level	Place	Teammate(s)
1	2018–19	10 February 2019	Lahti, Finland	6 × 1.6 km Team Sprint C	World Cup	3rd	Hakola
2	2020–21	24 January 2021	Lahti, Finland	4 × 7.5 km Relay C/F	World Cup	2nd	Hyvärinen / Hakola / Mäki
3	2021–22	13 March 2022	Falun, Sweden	4 × 5 km Mixed Relay F	World Cup	2nd	K. Niskanen / Hyvärinen / Pärmäkoski
4	2023–24	1 March 2024	Lahti, Finland	6 × 1.3 km Team Sprint C	World Cup	3rd	Vuorinen

== Awards ==
- Finnish Sports Personality of the Year: 2014 (shared with Sami Jauhojärvi), 2017, 2018, 2022

== Personal life ==
Iivo Niskanen's sister Kerttu is also a cross-country skier and a four-time Olympic medalist. Iivo and Kerttu Niskanen are regarded as great sporting heroes in their childhood hometown of Vieremä, North Savo, which regularly hosts festivities following the siblings' Olympic and World Championship success. They are also the only siblings who have won cross-country World Cup races on the same day and place: this happened on 29 December 2021, when they won the 10 and 15 km classical Stage World Cup events in Lenzerheide, Switzerland. At the season finale in Falun, Sweden, the siblings shared a World Cup podium for the first time when they skied the 1st and 3rd legs of the mixed relay event, where Finland placed second. Niskanen's other sister Katri is a highly regarded Finnish fashion designer.

Iivo Niskanen married his long-time partner Saana Kemppainen in the summer of 2018. The couple resides in Kuopio, Finland, and Niskanen currently represents the local club Puijon Hiihtoseura.

== See also ==
- List of Olympic medalist families
