= Marcus Grate =

Swedish cross-country skier (born 1996)

Personal information
- Nationality: Sweden
- Born: 27 December 1996 (age 29) Vaxholm, Sweden

Sport
- Sport: Skiing
- Club: IFK Umeå

World Cup career
- Seasons: 8 – (2018–present)
- Indiv. starts: 44
- Indiv. podiums: 1
- Team starts: 8
- Team podiums: 1
- Team wins: 0
- Overall titles: 0 – (46th in 2022)
- Discipline titles: 0
- Updated on 3 January 2025

Marcus Grate (born 27 December 1996) is a Swedish cross-country skier. He competed in the sprint at the 2022 Winter Olympics.

== Cross-country skiing results ==
All results are sourced from the International Ski Federation (FIS).

=== Olympic Games ===
Year	Age	15 km individual	30 km skiathlon	50 km mass start	Sprint	4 × 10 km relay	Team sprint
2022	25	—	—	—^{[a]}	16	—	—

^{a} Distance reduced to 30 km due to weather conditions.

=== World Championships ===
Year	Age	15 km individual	30 km skiathlon	50 km mass start	Sprint	4 × 10 km relay	Team sprint
2021	24	—	—	—	18	—	—
2023	26	—	—	—	12	—	—

=== World Cup ===
==== Season standings ====
Season	Age	Discipline standings				Ski Tour standings			
Season	Age	Overall	Distance	Sprint	U23	Nordic Opening	Tour de Ski	Ski Tour 2020	World Cup Final
2018	21	NC	—	NC	NC	—	—	—N/a	—
2019	22	68	—	31	12	—	—	—N/a	—
2020	23	48	—	16	—N/a	—	—	—	—N/a
2021	24	79	NC	38	—N/a	62	—	—N/a	—N/a
2022	25	46	—	22	—N/a	—N/a	—	—N/a	—N/a
2023	26	51	NC	23	—N/a	—N/a	—	—N/a	—N/a

==== Individual podiums ====
- 0 victories – (0 WC, 0 SWC)
- 1 podium – (1 SWC)

No.	Season	Date	Location	Race	Level	Place
1	2024–25	3 January 2025	Val di Fiemme, Italy	1.2 km Sprint C	Stage World Cup	3rd

==== Team podiums ====
- 1 podium – (1 TS)

No.	Season	Date	Location	Race	Level	Place	Teammate
1	2019–20	12 January 2020	Dresden, Germany	12 x 0.65 km Team Sprint F	World Cup	2nd	Häggström
