= Ben Ogden =

American cross-country skier (born 2000)

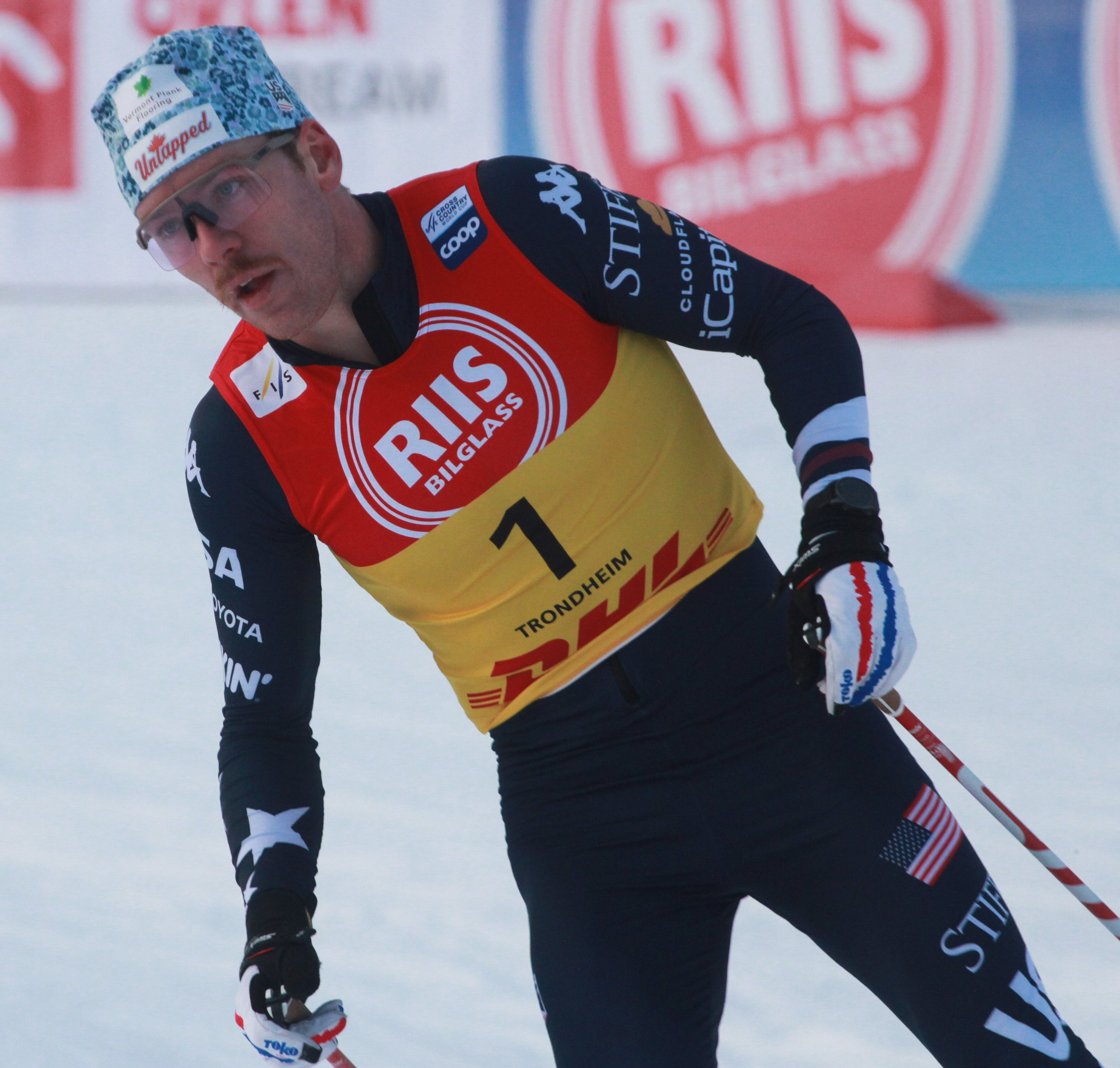

Personal information
- Nationality: United States
- Born: February 13, 2000 (age 26) Lebanon, New Hampshire, United States
- Height: 184 cm (6 ft 0 in)

Sport
- Sport: Skiing
- Club: Stratton Mountain School

World Cup career
- Seasons: 6 – (2019, 2021–present)
- Indiv. starts: 75
- Indiv. podiums: 2
- Team starts: 7
- Team podiums: 0
- Overall titles: 0 – (8th in 2023)
- Discipline titles: 1 – (U23 in 2023)
Medal record
Men's cross-country skiing
Representing United States
Olympic Games
Silver medal – second place	2026 Milano Cortina	Individual sprint
Silver medal – second place	2026 Milano Cortina	Team sprint
Junior World Championships
Gold medal – first place	2019 Lahti	4 × 5 km relay
Gold medal – first place	2020 Oberwiesenthal	4 × 5 km relay
Silver medal – second place	2018 Goms	4 × 5 km relay
- Updated on 17 January 2025

Benjamin Ogden (born February 13, 2000) is an American cross-country skier. He has been a member of the U.S. Cross Country Ski Team since 2019. Ogden made history in 2018 at the FIS Junior World Ski Championships in Goms, Switzerland, when he and his teammates secured a silver medal in the junior men's relay, which was the first ever medal for the U.S. men at a World Juniors Championship event. At the 2026 Winter Olympics, Ogden won a silver medal in the men's sprint, becoming the first American to win an Olympic medal in men's cross-country skiing since Bill Koch's silver in 1976.

== Early life ==
Ogden grew up in Landgrove, Vermont. He and his older sister, Katharine, who is also a professional skier, were taught to ski by their father. As a young skier, he trained with the West River Nordic Club at the Wild Wings XC Center.

== Athletic career ==
=== 2017–2018: Juniors ===
In 2018, Ogden became one of 12 skiers named to the squad for the FIS Nordic Junior World Ski Championships by U.S. Ski & Snowboard. Ogden, along with teammates Luke Jager, Hunter Wonders, and Gus Schumacher, won the silver medal in the 4 × 5 km relay race – the first ever medal for the U.S. men at the World Junior Ski Championships. Ogden skied the second leg of the relay, moving the team up from sixth to fourth place at the hand-off.

=== 2018–2019: Return to Juniors and World Cup debut ===
Ogden was nominated to the 2018–2019 U.S. Ski Team as a member of the D Team. During the 2019 FIS Nordic Junior World Ski Championships in Lahti, Ogden and his teammates won the gold medal in the 4 × 5 km relay race, improving upon the result the U.S. had achieved during the previous season. Ogden skied the second classic leg for the team composed of Luke Jager, Johnny Hagenbuch, and Gus Schumacher. Ogden made his World Cup debut on 22 March 2019 in Quebec City, Canada. He was one of nine SMS T2 skiers to qualify for the 2018–2019 World Cup Finals.

=== 2019–2020: World Juniors Gold and NCAA Championships ===
Ogden was again nominated to the D Team with the U.S. Ski Team for the 2019–2020 season. On 6 March 2020, Ogden, Jager, Hagenbuch, and Schumacher became repeat champions and took home the gold medal at the 2020 FIS Junior Cross Country World Championships in Oberwiesenthal. Later that month, Ogden took first place in the 10 km freestyle race at the 2020 NCAA National Skiing Championships in Bozeman, Montana. On 12 March 2020, 30 minutes after the freestyle podium ceremony, the NCAA announced that all remaining races were cancelled due to COVID-19 concerns.

=== 2020–2021 ===
The Davis U.S. Cross Country Ski Team announced their roster for the 2020–2021 season on 7 November 2020, with Ogden once again included as a member of the D Team.

=== 2021–2022: Olympic debut ===
At the 2022 Winter Olympics in Beijing, Ogden placed 12th in the freestyle sprint race, which was the best-ever men’s individual sprint finish for the United States. At the 2022 NCAA National Skiing Championships, Ogden claimed his second national title when he won the men's 10 km classical race.

=== 2026 Winter Olympics ===
At the 2026 Winter Olympics, Ogden made history in cross-country skiing by winning a silver medal in the men's sprint classic, finishing just behind Norway's 11-time Olympic champion Johannes Høsflot Klæbo. Ogden's podium finish marked the first Olympic medal by a U.S. man in cross-country skiing since Bill Koch in 1976. He also won a silver medal in the men's team sprint with Gus Schumacher, becoming the most decorated U.S. male cross-country skier in Olympic history.

== Cross-country skiing results ==
All results are sourced from the International Ski Federation (FIS).

=== Olympic Games ===
Year	Age	15 km individual	30 km skiathlon	50 km mass start	Sprint	4 × 10 km relay	Team sprint
2022	22	42	—	—^{[a]}	12	—	9
2026	25	—	—	—	2nd place, silver medalist(s)	—	2nd place, silver medalist(s)

^{a} Distance reduced to 30 km due to weather conditions.

=== World Championships ===
Year	Age	individual	30 km skiathlon	50 km mass start	Sprint	relay	Team sprint
2021	21	—	45	—	17	—	—
2023	23	27	—	—	26	7	10
2025	25	47			12	7	

=== World Cup ===
==== Season titles ====
- 1 title – (1 U23)

Season
Season	Discipline
2023	U23

==== Season standings ====
Season	Age	Discipline standings				Ski Tour standings		
Season	Age	Overall	Distance	Sprint	U23	Nordic Opening	Tour de Ski	World Cup Final
2019	19	NC	NC	NC	NC	—	—	66
2021	21	NC	NC	NC	NC	—	—	—N/a
2022	22	57	75	30	6	—N/a	DNF	—N/a
2023	23	8	26	10	1st place, gold medalist(s)	—N/a	13	—N/a
2024	24	32	46	15	—N/a	—N/a	DNF	—N/a
2025	25	10	22	7	—N/a	—N/a	15	—N/a

==== Individual podiums ====
- 2 podiums – (1 WC, 1 SWC)

No.	Season	Date	Location	Race	Level	Place
1	2023–24	30 December 2023	Toblach, Italy	1.4 km Sprint F	Stage World Cup	3rd
2	2024–25	17 January 2025	Les Rousses, France	10 km Individual F	World Cup	3rd

== Personal life ==
Ogden graduated from the Stratton Mountain School in 2018 and is currently enrolled as a graduate student at the University of Vermont, where he studies mechanical engineering. When he is not racing in Europe, Ogden lives in Burlington, Vermont with his best friends Phoebe Sweet, Sam Noel and Marielle Ackermann. He also spends his spare time honing his skills on the Kendama. Ogden is a member of the UVM ski team, and he trains with the SMS T2 Team, an elite professional team based in Stratton Mountain, Vermont when his schedule allows.
