= Ondřej Černý =

Czech cross-country skier (born 1999)

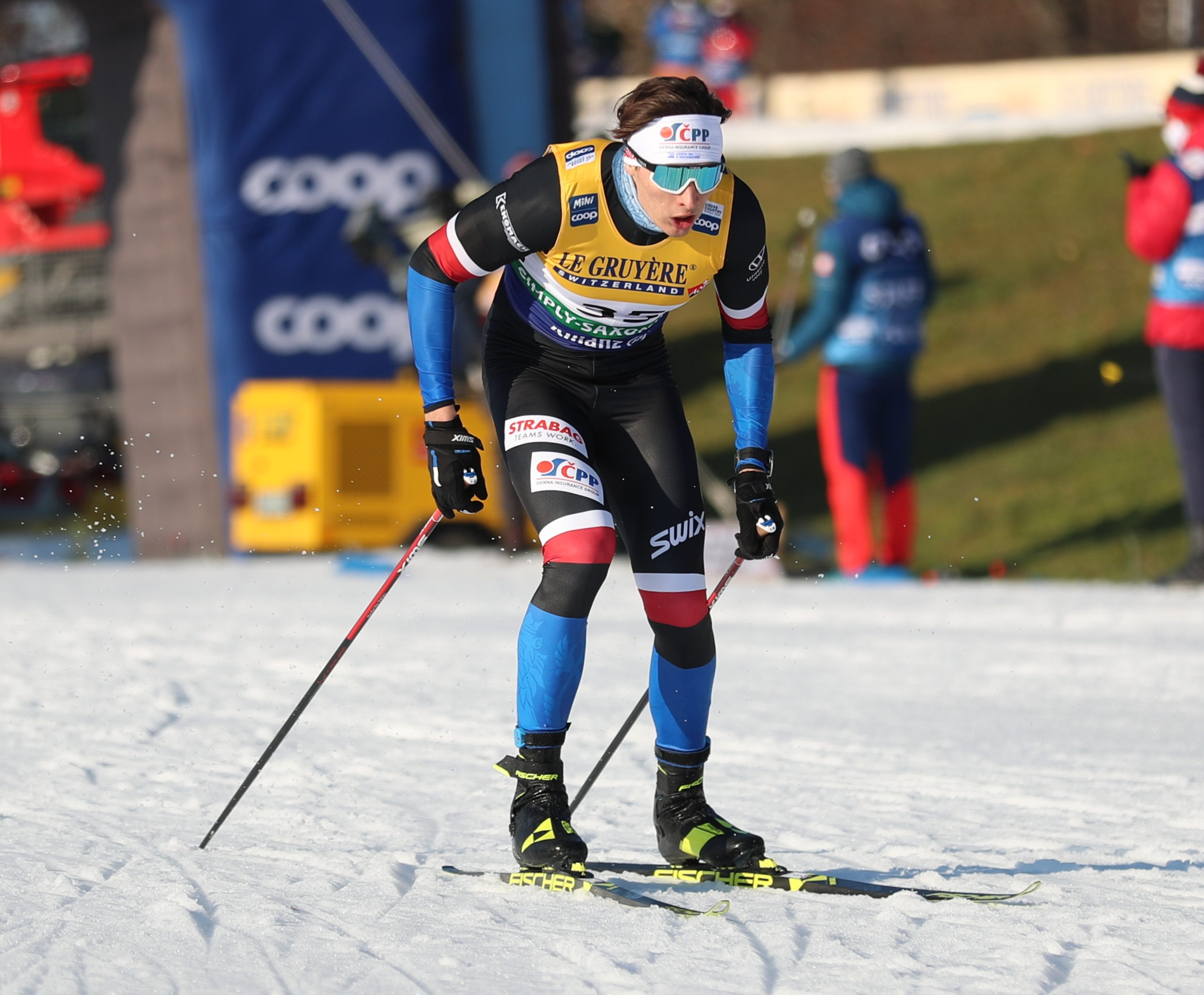
- Ondřej Černý in 2020

Personal information
- Nationality: Czech Republic
- Born: 4 March 1999 (age 27) Prague, Czech Republic

Sport
- Sport: Skiing
- Club: LK Slovan Karlovy Vary

World Cup career
- Seasons: 4 – (2020–present)
- Indiv. starts: 19
- Indiv. podiums: 0
- Team starts: 2
- Team podiums: 0
- Overall titles: 0 – (33rd in 2023)
- Discipline titles: 0
- Updated on 29 March 2023

Ondřej Černý (born 4 March 1999) is a Czech cross-country skier. He competed in the sprint at the 2022 Winter Olympics.

== Cross-country skiing results ==
All results are sourced from the International Ski Federation (FIS).

=== Olympic Games ===
Year	Age	15 km individual	30 km skiathlon	50 km mass start	Sprint	4 × 10 km relay	Team sprint
2022	22	—	—	—^{[a]}	26	—	—

^{a} Distance reduced to 30 km due to weather conditions.

=== World Championships ===
Year	Age	15 km individual	30 km skiathlon	50 km mass start	Sprint	4 × 10 km relay	Team sprint
2021	21	—	—	—	21	—	—
2023	23	—	—	—	28	—	—

=== World Cup ===
==== Season standings ====
Season	Age	Discipline standings				Ski Tour standings			
Season	Age	Overall	Distance	Sprint	U23	Nordic Opening	Tour de Ski	Ski Tour 2020	World Cup Final
2020	20	135	—	81	11	—	—	—	—N/a
2021	21	120	—	71	20	—	DNF	—N/a	—N/a
2022	22	78	—	42	12	—N/a	—	—N/a	—N/a
2023	23	33	—	15	—N/a	—N/a	—	—N/a	—N/a
