= Anton Persson (skier) =

Swedish cross-country skier (born 1995)

Personal information
- Full name: Pär Anton Persson
- Nationality: Sweden
- Born: 26 February 1995 (age 31) Torsby, Sweden
- Height: 1.83 m (6 ft 0 in)

Sport
- Sport: Skiing
- Club: Falun-Borlänge SK

World Cup career
- Seasons: 8 – (2016–present)
- Indiv. starts: 34
- Indiv. podiums: 0
- Team starts: 0
- Team podiums: 0
- Overall titles: 0 – (48th in 2022)
- Discipline titles: 0
- Updated on 29 March 2023

Anton Persson (born 26 February 1995) is a Swedish retired cross-country skier. He competed in the sprint at the 2022 Winter Olympics.

== Cross-country skiing results ==
All results are sourced from the International Ski Federation (FIS).

=== Olympic Games ===
Year	Age	15 km individual	30 km skiathlon	50 km mass start	Sprint	4 × 10 km relay	Team sprint
2022	27	—	—	—^{[a]}	24	—	—

^{a} Distance reduced to 30 km due to weather conditions.

=== World Championships ===
Year	Age	15 km individual	30 km skiathlon	50 km mass start	Sprint	4 × 10 km relay	Team sprint
2021	26	—	—	—	30	—	—

=== World Cup ===
==== Season standings ====
Season	Age	Discipline standings				Ski Tour standings				
Season	Age	Overall	Distance	Sprint	U23	Nordic Opening	Tour de Ski	Ski Tour 2020	World Cup Final	Ski Tour Canada
2016	21	NC	—	NC	NC	—	—	—N/a	—N/a	—
2017	22	NC	NC	NC	NC	—	—	—N/a	—	—N/a
2018	23	118	NC	64	16	—	—	—N/a	DNF	—N/a
2019	24	129	NC	80	—N/a	78	—	—N/a	—	—N/a
2020	25	99	—	61	—N/a	—	—	—	—N/a	—N/a
2021	26	96	—	56	—N/a	—	—	—N/a	—N/a	—N/a
2022	27	48	—	25	—N/a	—N/a	—	—N/a	—N/a	—N/a
2023	28	103	NC	54	—N/a	—N/a	DNF	—N/a	—N/a	—N/a
