= Cross-country skiing at the 2022 Winter Olympics – Men's sprint =

Men’s sprint at the XXIV Olympic Winter Games
- Cross-country skiing
- Venue: Kuyangshu Nordic Center and Biathlon Center, Zhangjiakou
- Date: 8 February 2022
- Competitors: 90 from 44 nations

Medalists
1st place, gold medalist(s)		Johannes Høsflot Klæbo	Norway
2nd place, silver medalist(s)		Federico Pellegrino	Italy
3rd place, bronze medalist(s)		Alexander Terentyev	ROC

The men’s sprint competition in cross-country skiing at the 2022 Winter Olympics was held on 8 February, at the Kuyangshu Nordic Center and Biathlon Center in Zhangjiakou. The event was won by Johannes Høsflot Klæbo of Norway, who defended his 2018 title. The 2018 silver medalist, Federico Pellegrino, won the silver medal again. Alexander Terentyev, representing the Russian Olympic Committee, won the bronze medal. This was his first Olympic medal.

== Summary ==
The 2018 bronze medalist, Alexander Bolshunov, qualified for the Olympics, but did not start as he focused on distance events. The overall leader of the 2021–22 FIS Cross-Country World Cup before the Olympics, as well as the sprint leader, was Klæbo. He was the 2021 World Champion in individual sprint.

== Results ==
=== Qualifying ===
The qualifying was held at 16:45.

Rank	Bib	Athlete	Country	Time	Deficit	Note
1	16	Lucas Chanavat	France	2:45.03		Q
2	28	Sergey Ustiugov	ROC	2:46.51	+1.48	Q
3	22	Johannes Høsflot Klæbo	Norway	2:46.74	+1.71	Q
4	10	Richard Jouve	France	2:47.93	+2.90	Q
5	3	Wang Qiang	China	2:48.91	+3.88	Q
6	12	Federico Pellegrino	Italy	2:49.55	+4.52	Q
7	18	Håvard Solås Taugbøl	Norway	2:49.93	+4.90	Q
8	45	Johan Häggström	Sweden	2:50.61	+5.58	Q
9	41	Ondřej Černý	Czech Republic	2:50.65	+5.62	Q
10	35	Artem Maltsev	ROC	2:50.90	+5.87	Q
11	30	Lauri Vuorinen	Finland	2:50.91	+5.88	Q
12	14	Alexander Terentyev	ROC	2:50.92	+5.89	Q
13	6	JC Schoonmaker	United States	2:51.15	+6.12	Q
14	26	Pål Golberg	Norway	2:51.52	+6.49	Q
15	24	Erik Valnes	Norway	2:51.56	+6.53	Q
16	34	Renaud Jay	France	2:51.86	+6.83	Q
17	37	Oskar Svensson	Sweden	2:52.07	+7.04	Q
18	4	Marcus Grate	Sweden	2:52.14	+7.11	Q
19	32	Ben Ogden	United States	2:52.21	+7.18	Q
20	8	Jovian Hediger	Switzerland	2:52.47	+7.44	Q
21	36	Michal Novák	Czech Republic	2:52.49	+7.46	Q
22	42	Kevin Bolger	United States	2:52.50	+7.47	Q
23	44	Joni Mäki	Finland	2:52.83	+7.80	Q
24	2	Valerio Grond	Switzerland	2:53.17	+8.14	Q
25	17	Davide Graz	Italy	2:53.58	+8.55	Q
26	25	Maciej Staręga	Poland	2:53.61	+8.58	Q
27	38	Anton Persson	Sweden	2:53.71	+8.68	Q
28	53	Raimo Vīgants	Latvia	2:53.98	+8.95	Q
29	29	Luděk Šeller	Czech Republic	2:54.09	+9.06	Q
30	11	Luke Jager	United States	2:54.44	+9.41	Q
31	46	Roman Schaad	Switzerland	2:54.57	+9.54	
32	48	Hiroyuki Miyazawa	Japan	2:54.64	+9.61	
33	33	Jan Pechoušek	Czech Republic	2:55.03	+10.00	
34	23	Graham Ritchie	Canada	2:55.04	+10.01	
35	40	Francesco De Fabiani	Italy	2:55.56	+10.53	
36	43	Andrew Young	Great Britain	2:55.60	+10.57	
37	52	Jaume Pueyo	Spain	2:55.76	+10.73	
38	5	Janosch Brugger	Germany	2:56.01	+10.98	
39	21	Michael Föttinger	Austria	2:56.58	+11.55	
40	39	James Clugnet	Great Britain	2:56.72	+11.69	
41	51	Henri Roos	Estonia	2:57.15	+12.12	
42	47	Vili Črv	Slovenia	2:57.39	+12.36	
43	19	Benjamin Moser	Austria	2:58.07	+13.04	
44	31	Miha Šimenc	Slovenia	2:58.14	+13.11	
45	13	Marko Kilp	Estonia	2:58.95	+13.92	
46	60	Ruslan Perekhoda	Ukraine	2:59.34	+14.31	
47	63	Raul Popa	Romania	2:59.85	+14.82	
48	49	Martin Himma	Estonia	3:00.07	+15.04	
49	54	Modestas Vaičiulis	Lithuania	3:01.28	+16.25	
50	55	Phillip Bellingham	Australia	3:01.57	+16.54	
51	27	Maicol Rastelli	Italy	3:02.04	+17.01	
52	57	Mark Chanloung	Thailand	3:02.12	+17.09	
53	9	Yahor Shpuntau	Belarus	3:02.17	+17.14	
54	56	Olivier Léveillé	Canada	3:02.26	+17.23	
55	75	Lars Young Vik	Australia	3:02.52	+17.49	
56	1	Antoine Cyr	Canada	3:02.59	+17.56	
57	66	Haruki Yamashita	Japan	3:02.60	+17.57	
58	50	Kamil Bury	Poland	3:02.73	+17.70	
59	70	Strahinja Erić	Bosnia and Herzegovina	3:03.05	+18.02	
60	73	Ciren Zhandui	China	3:03.22	+18.19	
61	80	Hugo Hinckfuss	Australia	3:04.44	+19.41	
62	64	Yevgeniy Velichko	Kazakhstan	3:04.52	+19.49	
63	62	Seve de Campo	Australia	3:04.81	+19.78	
64	58	Oleksiy Krasovsky	Ukraine	3:05.52	+20.49	
65	67	Miha Ličef	Slovenia	3:05.98	+20.95	
66	65	Vitaliy Pukhkalo	Kazakhstan	3:06.31	+21.28	
67	59	Shang Jincai	China	3:06.52	+21.49	
68	72	Tautvydas Strolia	Lithuania	3:06.76	+21.73	
69	69	Marko Skender	Croatia	3:06.86	+21.83	
70	82	Roberts Slotiņš	Latvia	3:07.41	+22.38	
71	78	Manex Silva	Brazil	3:08.64	+23.61	
72	71	Ádám Kónya	Hungary	3:09.43	+24.40	
73	68	Samuel Ikpefan	Nigeria	3:09.57	+24.54	
74	15	Janez Lampič	Slovenia	3:09.95	+24.92	
74	74	Franco Dal Farra	Argentina	3:09.95	+24.92	
76	76	Thibaut de Marre	Belgium	3:10.66	+25.63	
77	83	Batmönkhiin Achbadrakh	Mongolia	3:11.60	+26.57	
78	61	Isak Stianson Pedersen	Iceland	3:11.95	+26.92	
79	79	Liu Rongsheng	China	3:12.14	+27.11	
80	77	Yusuf Emre Fırat	Turkey	3:15.96	+30.93	
81	81	Jeong Jong-won	South Korea	3:16.15	+31.12	
82	89	Kim Min-woo	South Korea	3:19.76	+34.73	
83	86	Apostolos Angelis	Greece	3:20.87	+35.84	
84	88	Aleksandar Grbović	Montenegro	3:24.12	+39.09	
85	84	Yonathan Jesús Fernández	Chile	3:26.12	+41.09	
86	87	Stavre Jada	North Macedonia	3:29.13	+44.10	
87	85	Elie Tawk	Lebanon	3:47.73	+1:02.70	
88	90	Carlos Quintana	Colombia	4:08.66	+1:23.63	
	7	Aliaksandr Voranau	Belarus	Did not start		
	20	Alexander Bolshunov	ROC	Did not start		

=== Quarterfinals ===
Quarterfinal 1

Rank	Seed	Athlete	Country	Time	Deficit	Notes
1	3	Johannes Høsflot Klæbo	Norway	2:51.57		Q
2	2	Sergey Ustiugov	ROC	2:51.94	+0.37	Q
3	17	Oskar Svensson	Sweden	2:52.26	+0.69	LL
4	19	Ben Ogden	United States	2:53.00	+1.43	LL
5	27	Anton Persson	Sweden	2:53.35	+1.78	
6	16	Renaud Jay	France	3:35.80	+44.23	

Quarterfinal 2

Rank	Seed	Athlete	Country	Time	Deficit	Notes
1	6	Federico Pellegrino	Italy	2:53.08		Q
2	1	Lucas Chanavat	France	2:53.43	+0.35	Q
3	18	Marcus Grate	Sweden	2:53.71	+0.63	
4	24	Valerio Grond	Switzerland	2:54.12	+1.04	
5	21	Michal Novák	Czech Republic	2:55.36	+2.28	
6	25	Davide Graz	Italy	2:56.09	+3.01	

Quarterfinal 3

Rank	Seed	Athlete	Country	Time	Deficit	Notes
1	4	Richard Jouve	France	2:57.92		Q
2	7	Håvard Solås Taugbøl	Norway	2:57.93	+0.01	Q
3	8	Johan Häggström	Sweden	2:58.01	+0.09	
4	22	Kevin Bolger	United States	2:58.54	+0.62	
5	30	Luke Jager	United States	2:59.14	+1.22	
6	29	Luděk Šeller	Czech Republic	3:01.83	+3.91	

Quarterfinal 4

Rank	Seed	Athlete	Country	Time	Deficit	Notes
1	15	Erik Valnes	Norway	2:49.31		Q
2	10	Artem Maltsev	ROC	2:50.37	+1.06	Q
3	11	Lauri Vuorinen	Finland	2:54.64	+5.33	
4	28	Raimo Vīgants	Latvia	3:06.63	+17.32	
5	14	Pål Golberg	Norway	3:14.81	+25.50	
	5	Wang Qiang	China	Disqualified		

Quarterfinal 5

Rank	Seed	Athlete	Country	Time	Deficit	Notes
1	23	Joni Mäki	Finland	2:57.59		Q
2	12	Alexander Terentyev	ROC	2:57.93	+0.34	Q
3	13	JC Schoonmaker	United States	2:58.13	+0.54	
4	26	Maciej Staręga	Poland	2:58.56	+0.97	
5	20	Jovian Hediger	Switzerland	2:58.87	+1.28	
6	9	Ondřej Černý	Czech Republic	3:10.62	+13.03	

=== Semifinals ===
Semifinal 1

Rank	Seed	Athlete	Country	Time	Deficit	Notes
1	6	Federico Pellegrino	Italy	2:52.17		Q
2	3	Johannes Høsflot Klæbo	Norway	2:52.23	+0.06	Q
3	4	Richard Jouve	France	2:52.31	+0.14	
4	2	Sergey Ustiugov	ROC	2:52.35	+0.18	
5	1	Lucas Chanavat	France	2:52.92	+0.75	
6	19	Ben Ogden	United States	2:53.41	+1.24	

Semifinal 2

Rank	Seed	Athlete	Country	Time	Deficit	Notes
1	12	Alexander Terentyev	ROC	2:50.67		Q
2	23	Joni Mäki	Finland	2:51.10	+0.43	Q
3	17	Oskar Svensson	Sweden	2:51.22	+0.55	LL
4	10	Artem Maltsev	ROC	2:51.50	+0.83	LL
5	7	Håvard Solås Taugbøl	Norway	2:52.46	+1.79	
6	15	Erik Valnes	Norway	3:13.28	+22.61	

=== Final ===
The final was held at 20:11.

Rank	Seed	Athlete	Country	Time	Deficit	Notes
1st place, gold medalist(s)	3	Johannes Høsflot Klæbo	Norway	2:58.06		
2nd place, silver medalist(s)	6	Federico Pellegrino	Italy	2:58.32	+0.26	
3rd place, bronze medalist(s)	12	Alexander Terentyev	ROC	2:59.37	+1.31	
4	23	Joni Mäki	Finland	3:00.18	+2.12	
5	10	Artem Maltsev	ROC	3:01.65	+3.59	
6	17	Oskar Svensson	Sweden	3:04.23	+6.17	
