= Andrew Young (skier) =

British cross-country skier (born 1992)

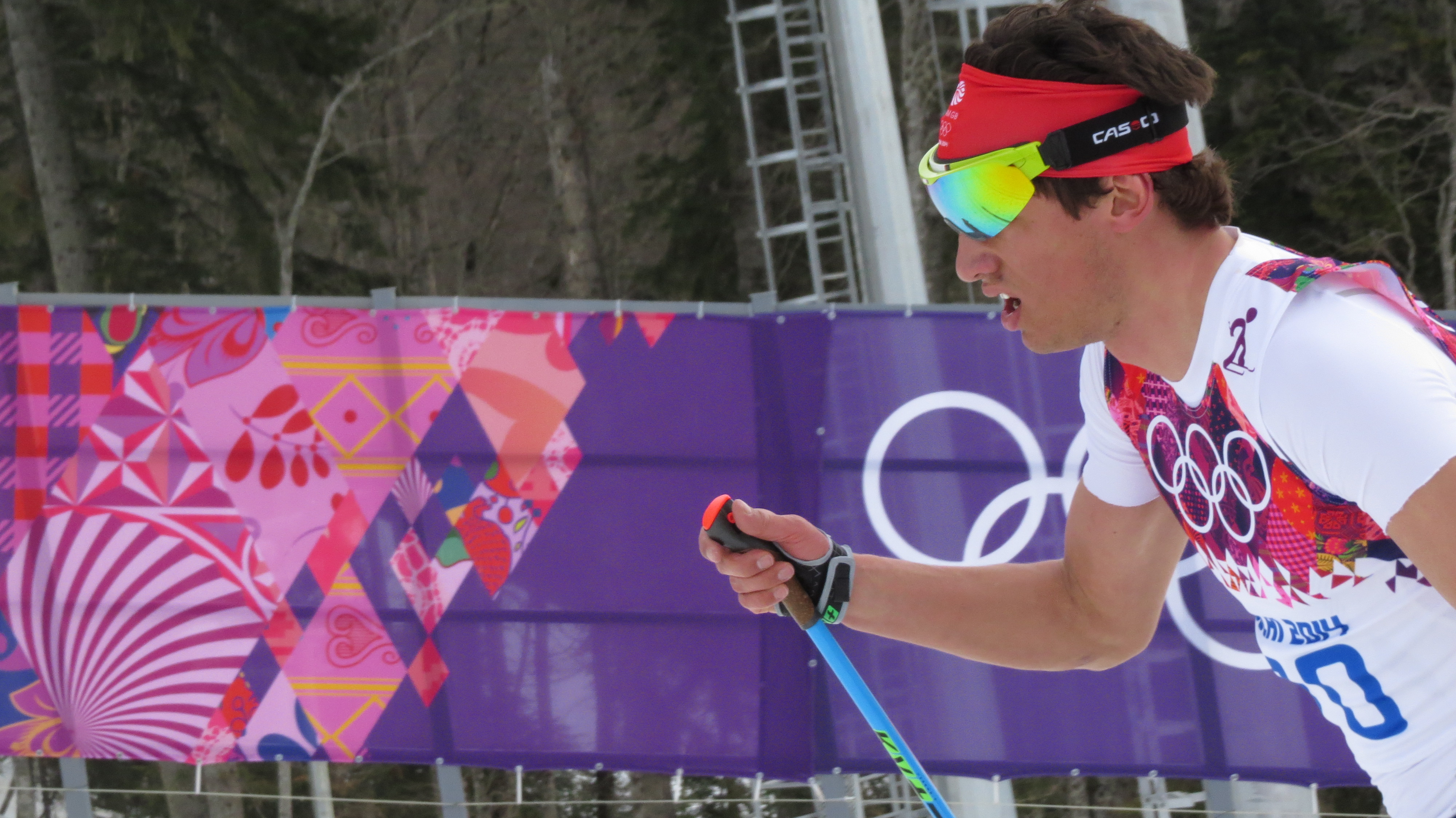
- Andrew Young in 2014

Personal information
- Nationality: United Kingdom
- Born: 12 February 1992 (age 34) Huntly, Scotland

Sport
- Sport: Skiing
- Club: Huntly Nordic SC

World Cup career
- Seasons: 15 – (2009–present)
- Indiv. starts: 150
- Indiv. podiums: 4
- Indiv. wins: 0
- Team starts: 11
- Team podiums: 0
- Team wins: 0
- Overall titles: 0 – (25th in 2021)
- Discipline titles: 0
- Updated on 29 March 2023

Andrew "Andy" Young (born 12 February 1992) is a Scottish cross-country skier. He competed for Great Britain in the 2010 Winter Olympics in Vancouver, finishing in 74th place in the 15km freestyle. In 2008, he became the youngest skier to compete in a World Cup event.

At the 2010 Games, Young finished 14th in the team sprint event and 60th in the individual sprint event. For the FIS Nordic World Ski Championships 2009, he finished 14th in the 4 × 10 km relay and 98th in the individual sprint event.

Young also competed in the 2014 Winter Olympics, where he finished 37th in the 15km classical competition.

Young took his first top 10 finish in the Cross-Country Skiing World Cup in December 2015, when he finished in ninth place at a freestyle sprint competition in Davos, Switzerland. On 19 December 2015 he took Great Britain's first World Cup podium when he finished third in a sprint event in a 2015–16 FIS Cross-Country World Cup competition in Toblach, Italy. Young achieved a top 10 result in December 2019, finishing 8th in the 15 km freestyle event in Davos.

== Cross-country skiing results ==
All results are sourced from the International Ski Federation (FIS).

=== Olympic Games ===
Year	Age	15 km individual	30 km skiathlon	50 km mass start	Sprint	4 × 10 km relay	Team sprint
2010	18	74	—	—	60	—	DNF
2014	22	37	—	—	42	—	DNF
2018	26	57	—	—	46	—	12
2022	28	51	—	—^{[a]}	36	—	20

^{a} Distance reduced to 30 km due to weather conditions.

=== World Championships ===
Year	Age	15 km individual	30 km skiathlon	50 km mass start	Sprint	4 × 10 km relay	Team sprint
2009	17	—	—	—	98	14	—
2011	19	—	—	—	61	15	—
2013	21	53	55	54	45	—	—
2015	23	—	—	—	40	—	—
2017	25	46	DNF	—	22	—	—
2019	27	36	—	38	22	—	13
2021	29	45	—	—	—	—	13
2023	31	29	—	—	46	—	6

=== World Cup ===
==== Season standings ====
Season	Age	Discipline standings			Ski Tour standings				
Season	Age	Overall	Distance	Sprint	Nordic Opening	Tour de Ski	Ski Tour 2020	World Cup Final	Ski Tour Canada
2009	17	NC	NC	NC	—N/a	—	—N/a	—	—N/a
2010	18	NC	NC	NC	—N/a	—	—N/a	—	—N/a
2011	19	NC	—	NC	—	—	—N/a	—	—N/a
2012	20	NC	—	NC	—	—	—N/a	—	—N/a
2013	21	NC	NC	NC	—	DNF	—N/a	—	—N/a
2015	23	110	NC	56	DNF	DNF	—N/a	—N/a	—N/a
2016	24	46	NC	17	—	DNF	—N/a	—N/a	DNF
2017	25	53	81	25	—	DNF	—N/a	27	—N/a
2018	26	74	NC	33	—	DNF	—N/a	63	—N/a
2019	27	51	52	29	DNF	DNF	—N/a	32	—N/a
2020	28	43	37	28	—	—	DNF	—N/a	—N/a
2021	29	25	33	7	14	—	—N/a	—N/a	—N/a
2022	30	62	78	32	—N/a	—	—N/a	—N/a	—N/a
2023	31	64	68	41	—N/a	—	—N/a	—N/a	—N/a

==== Individual podiums ====
- 4 podiums – (3 WC, 1 SWC)

No.	Season	Date	Location	Race	Level	Place
1	2015–16	19 December 2015	Toblach, Italy	1.3 km Sprint F	World Cup	3rd
2	2018–19	24 March 2019	Quebec City, Canada	15 km Pursuit F	Stage World Cup	3rd
3	2020–21	12 December 2020	Davos, Switzerland	1.5 km Sprint F	World Cup	3rd
4	2020–21	19 December 2020	Dresden, Germany	1.3 km Sprint F	World Cup	2nd
