= Staręga =

Staręga is a Polish surname. Notable people with the surname include:

- Maciej Staręga (born 1990), Polish cross-country skier
- Monika Hojnisz-Staręga (born 1991), Polish biathlete
