= Luke Jager =

American cross-country skier (born 2000)

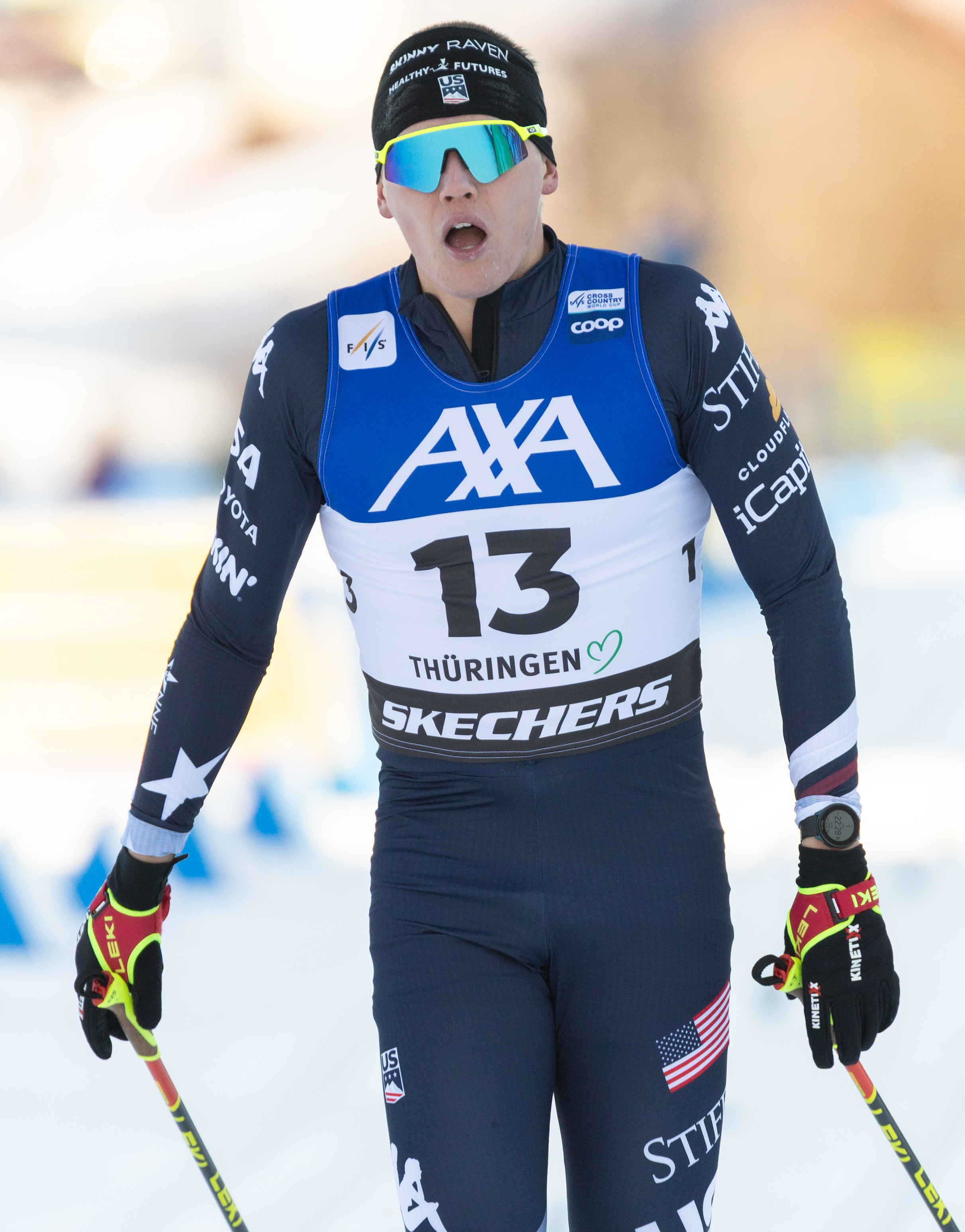

Personal information
- Nationality: United States
- Born: January 17, 2000 (age 26) Redding, California, U.S.

Sport
- Sport: Skiing
- Club: APU Nordic Ski Center

World Cup career
- Seasons: 3 – (2021–present)
- Indiv. starts: 20
- Indiv. podiums: 0
- Team starts: 3
- Team podiums: 0
- Overall titles: 0 – (92nd in 2022)
- Discipline titles: 0
Medal record
Men's cross-country skiing
Representing United States
Junior World Championships
Gold medal – first place	2019 Lahti	4 × 5 km relay
Gold medal – first place	2020 Oberwiesenthal	4 × 5 km relay
Silver medal – second place	2018 Goms	4 × 5 km relay
- Updated on March 29, 2023

Luke Jager (born January 17, 2000) is an American cross-country skier. He competed in the sprint and skied the first leg of the Men’s 4 × 10 km relay at the 2022 Winter Olympics. He attended West Anchorage High School in Anchorage, Alaska. Luke skis collegiately for the University of Utah and is studying Economics in the class of 2023.

== Cross-country skiing results ==
All results are sourced from the International Ski Federation (FIS).

=== Olympic Games ===
Year	Age	15 km individual	30 km skiathlon	50 km mass start	Sprint	4 × 10 km relay	Team sprint
2022	22	—	—	—^{[a]}	25	9	—

^{a} Distance reduced to 30 km due to weather conditions.

=== World Championships ===
Year	Age	15 km individual	30 km skiathlon	50 km mass start	Sprint	4 × 10 km relay	Team sprint
2025	25			58			

=== World Cup ===
==== Season standings ====
Season	Age	Discipline standings				Ski Tour standings	
Season	Age	Overall	Distance	Sprint	U23	Nordic Opening	Tour de Ski
2021	21	NC	—	NC	NC	—	—
2022	22	92	76	63	15	—N/a	DNF
2023	23	122	94	74	19	—N/a	—
