= FIS Nordic World Ski Championships 2021 – Men's sprint =

Men's sprint at the FIS Nordic World Ski Championships 2021
- Location: Oberstdorf, Germany
- Date: 25 February
- Competitors: 157 from 54 nations
- Winning time: 3:01.30

Medalists
gold medal	Johannes Høsflot Klæbo	Norway
silver medal	Erik Valnes	Norway
bronze medal	Håvard Solås Taugbøl	Norway

The Men's sprint competition at the FIS Nordic World Ski Championships 2021 was held on 25 February 2021.

== Results ==
=== Qualification ===
The qualification was held at 09:50.

Rank	Bib	Athlete	Country	Time	Deficit	Notes
1	3	Johannes Høsflot Klæbo	Norway	3:00.08		Q
2	20	Erik Valnes	Norway	3:03.56	+3.48	Q
3	13	Federico Pellegrino	Italy	3:05.47	+5.39	Q
4	25	Pål Golberg	Norway	3:06.06	+5.98	Q
5	6	Gleb Retivykh	Russian Ski Federation	3:06.19	+6.11	Q
6	17	Håvard Solås Taugbøl	Norway	3:06.62	+6.54	Q
7	15	Joni Mäki	Finland	3:07.34	+7.26	Q
8	11	Alexander Terentyev	Russian Ski Federation	3:07.52	+7.44	Q
9	23	Sergey Ustiugov	Russian Ski Federation	3:07.59	+7.51	Q
10	18	Alexander Bolshunov	Russian Ski Federation	3:08.05	+7.97	Q
11	61	Ben Ogden	United States	3:08.18	+8.10	Q
12	21	Lauri Vuorinen	Finland	3:08.30	+8.22	Q
13	5	Jovian Hediger	Switzerland	3:08.95	+8.87	Q
14	31	Ondřej Černý	Czech Republic	3:09.39	+9.31	Q
15	26	Marcus Grate	Sweden	3:09.45	+9.37	Q
16	8	Emil Iversen	Norway	3:09.63	+9.55	Q
17	24	Lucas Chanavat	France	3:09.64	+9.56	Q
18	1	Michal Novák	Czech Republic	3:09.74	+9.66	Q
19	16	Richard Jouve	France	3:10.10	+10.02	Q
20	30	JC Schoonmaker	United States	3:10.18	+10.10	Q
21	32	Maicol Rastelli	Italy	3:10.56	+10.48	Q
22	35	Luděk Šeller	Czech Republic	3:10.69	+10.61	Q
23	19	Johan Häggström	Sweden	3:10.77	+10.69	Q
24	9	Francesco De Fabiani	Italy	3:10.85	+10.77	Q
25	41	Marko Kilp	Estonia	3:10.96	+10.88	Q
26	29	Ristomatti Hakola	Finland	3:10.98	+10.90	Q
27	50	Janosch Brugger	Germany	3:11.17	+11.09	Q
28	7	Oskar Svensson	Sweden	3:11.43	+11.35	Q
29	14	Valentin Chauvin	France	3:12.06	+11.98	Q
30	27	Anton Persson	Sweden	3:12.18	+12.10	Q
31	57	Antoine Cyr	Canada	3:12.53	+12.45	
32	28	Renaud Jay	France	3:12.57	+12.49	
33	36	Maciej Staręga	Poland	3:13.96	+13.88	
34	40	Graham Ritchie	Canada	3:14.18	+14.10	
35	22	Kevin Bolger	United States	3:15.15	+15.07	
36	2	Valerio Grond	Switzerland	3:15.29	+15.21	
37	42	Sebastian Eisenlauer	Germany	3:15.65	+15.57	
38	44	Anian Sossau	Germany	3:15.94	+15.86	
39	12	Logan Hanneman	United States	3:16.11	+16.03	
40	4	James Clugnet	Great Britain	3:16.38	+16.30	
41	33	Jan Pechoušek	Czech Republic	3:16.60	+16.52	
42	49	Martin Himma	Estonia	3:16.69	+16.61	
43	37	Benjamin Moser	Austria	3:16.84	+16.76	
44	65	Thomas Hjalmar Westgård	Ireland	3:16.88	+16.80	
45	45	Aliaksandr Voranau	Belarus	3:17.39	+17.31	
46	54	Kamil Bury	Poland	3:17.53	+17.45	
47	51	Yahor Shpuntau	Belarus	3:18.10	+18.02	
48	53	Vili Črv	Slovenia	3:18.22	+18.14	
49	59	Thomas Bing	Germany	3:18.52	+18.44	
50	55	Simone Mocellini	Italy	3:18.55	+18.47	
51	67	Kaarel Kasper Kõrge	Estonia	3:18.64	+18.56	
52	34	Erwan Käser	Switzerland	3:18.79	+18.71	
53	10	Roman Schaad	Switzerland	3:19.00	+18.92	
54	48	Konstantin Bortsov	Kazakhstan	3:19.02	+18.94	
55	39	Janez Lampič	Slovenia	3:19.03	+18.95	
56	79	Rémi Drolet	Canada	3:19.68	+19.60	
57	47	Juho Mikkonen	Finland	3:20.34	+20.26	
58	58	Jaume Pueyo	Spain	3:20.65	+20.57	
59	38	Michael Föttinger	Austria	3:21.28	+21.20	
60	56	Olzhas Klimin	Kazakhstan	3:21.47	+21.39	
61	73	Vitaliy Pukhkalo	Kazakhstan	3:21.60	+21.52	
62	46	Hiroyuki Miyazawa	Japan	3:21.86	+21.78	
63	77	Ruslan Perekhoda	Ukraine	3:22.60	+22.52	
64	60	Mika Vermeulen	Austria	3:23.28	+23.20	
65	43	Lukas Mrkonjic	Austria	3:23.85	+23.77	
66	63	Phillip Bellingham	Australia	3:24.35	+24.27	
67	83	Marko Skender	Croatia	3:25.48	+25.40	
68	80	Paul Constantin Pepene	Romania	3:25.90	+25.82	
69	64	Mark Chanloung	Thailand	3:26.32	+26.24	
70	62	Raimo Vīgants	Latvia	3:26.55	+26.47	
71	69	Modestas Vaičiulis	Lithuania	3:26.84	+26.76	
72	71	Raul Mihai Popa	Romania	3:27.33	+27.25	
73	86	Dmytro Drahun	Ukraine	3:27.81	+27.73	
74	101	Thibaut De Marre	Belgium	3:28.25	+28.17	
75	75	Indulis Bikše	Latvia	3:28.60	+28.52	
76	68	Isak Stianson Pedersen	Iceland	3:28.76	+28.68	
77	85	Kim Eun-ho	South Korea	3:29.45	+29.37	
77	90	Titouan Serot	Belgium	3:29.45	+29.37	
79	66	Alvar Johannes Alev	Estonia	3:29.85	+29.77	
80	76	Samuel Uduigowme Ikpefan	Nigeria	3:30.04	+29.96	
81	82	Ádám Kónya	Hungary	3:31.68	+31.60	
82	84	Petrică Hogiu	Romania	3:32.01	+31.93	
83	88	Niks Saulītis	Latvia	3:32.24	+32.16	
84	81	Tautvydas Strolia	Lithuania	3:32.47	+32.39	
85	70	Seve de Campo	Australia	3:32.53	+32.45	
86	99	Manex Silva	Brazil	3:35.19	+35.11	
87	87	Dagur Benediktsson	Iceland	3:35.40	+35.32	
88	150	Krešimir Crnković	Croatia	3:35.66	+35.58	
89	98	Jeong Jong-won	South Korea	3:36.28	+36.20	
90	159	Martin Møller	Denmark	3:37.79	+37.71	
91	119	Hjalmar Michelsen	Denmark	3:37.85	+37.77	
92	105	Amed Oğlağo	Turkey	3:38.84	+38.76	
93	92	Yusuf Emre Fırat	Turkey	3:39.19	+39.11	
94	89	Mark Pollock	Australia	3:39.25	+39.17	
95	91	Franco Dal Farra	Argentina	3:39.59	+39.51	
96	94	Ömer Ayçiçek	Turkey	3:42.37	+42.29	
97	95	Miloš Milosavljević	Serbia	3:43.93	+43.85	
98	127	Kim Min-woo	South Korea	3:44.40	+44.32	
99	96	Edvinas Simonutis	Lithuania	3:45.80	+45.72	
100	74	Hamza Dursun	Turkey	3:45.86	+45.78	
101	107	Lauris Kaparkalējs	Latvia	3:46.48	+46.40	
102	104	Daniel Peshkov	Bulgaria	3:47.08	+47.00	
103	115	Kristiyan Bozhilov	Bulgaria	3:47.55	+47.47	
104	111	Mathis Poutot	Belgium	3:48.34	+48.26	
105	123	Petar Perušić	Croatia	3:49.45	+49.37	
106	133	Jacob Weel Rosbo	Denmark	3:49.95	+49.87	
107	102	Seyed Sattar Seyd	Iran	3:50.12	+50.04	
108	103	Batmönkhiin Achbadrakh	Mongolia	3:50.25	+50.17	
109	78	Strahinja Erić	Bosnia and Herzegovina	3:50.73	+50.65	
110	122	Aleksandar Grbović	Montenegro	3:50.79	+50.71	
111	97	Victor Santos	Brazil	3:50.92	+50.84	
112	113	Todor Malchov	Bulgaria	3:51.77	+51.69	
113	72	Jaunius Drūsys	Lithuania	3:51.81	+51.73	
114	109	Gonzalo Ángel Gómez	Argentina	3:51.99	+51.91	
115	128	Otgonlkhagvayn Zolbayar	Mongolia	3:54.03	+53.95	
116	114	Ivan Zaharija	Croatia	3:55.15	+55.07	
117	130	Mario Matikanov	Bulgaria	3:55.34	+55.26	
118	112	Steve Hiestand	Brazil	3:56.22	+56.14	
119	116	Kristóf Lágler	Hungary	3:56.39	+56.31	
120	106	Matheus Vasconcellos	Brazil	3:56.78	+56.70	
121	125	Yasin Shemshaki	Iran	3:56.86	+56.78	
122	137	Spartak Voskanyan	Armenia	3:59.30	+59.22	
123	108	Danial Saveh Shemshaki	Iran	3:59.55	+59.47	
124	151	Rejhan Šmrković	Serbia	4:00.86	+1:00.78	
125	135	Timo Juhani Grönlund	Bolivia	4:02.01	+1:01.93	
126	120	Mateo Lorenzo Sauma	Argentina	4:04.06	+1:03.98	
127	110	Stavre Jada	North Macedonia	4:05.10	+1:05.02	
128	100	Yonathan Jesús Fernández	Chile	4:06.99	+1:06.91	
129	118	Dashdondogiin Mönkhgerel	Mongolia	4:08.18	+1:08.10	
130	136	Brian Kennedy	Ireland	4:09.39	+1:09.31	
131	124	Miloš Čolić	Bosnia and Herzegovina	4:10.39	+1:10.31	
132	153	Joachim Weel Rosbo	Denmark	4:11.43	+1:11.35	
133	93	Stefan Anić	Bosnia and Herzegovina	4:14.74	+1:14.66	
134	129	Alireza Moghdid	Iran	4:14.82	+1:14.74	
135	121	Angelos Antoniadis	Greece	4:17.09	+1:17.01	
136	152	Soma Gyallai	Hungary	4:23.17	+1:23.09	
137	126	Miloš Stević	Bosnia and Herzegovina	4:28.39	+1:28.31	
138	138	Dimitris Velivassis	Greece	4:29.38	+1:29.30	
139	145	Rodrigo Rangel	Mexico	4:30.30	+1:30.22	
140	148	Carlos Andrés Quintana	Colombia	4:31.85	+1:31.77	
141	154	Kleanthis Karamichas	Greece	4:32.54	+1:32.46	
142	132	Elie Tawk	Lebanon	4:32.64	+1:32.56	
143	143	Hrachya Panoyan	Armenia	4:35.09	+1:35.01	
144	131	Juan Luis Uberuaga	Chile	4:41.09	+1:41.01	
145	141	Miloš Đorđević	Serbia	4:41.46	+1:41.38	
146	134	Martín Flores	Chile	4:44.62	+1:44.54	
147	155	Đorđe Paunović	Serbia	4:49.74	+1:49.66	
148	156	Filipe Cabrita	Portugal	4:54.64	+1:54.56	
149	117	Paul Keyrouz	Lebanon	4:55.82	+1:55.74	
150	142	Tomás Díaz	Chile	5:15.22	+2:15.14	
151	147	José Cabeça	Portugal	5:25.16	+2:25.08	
152	146	Pedro Montes	Mexico	5:31.32	+2:31.24	
153	149	Nicholas Lau	Trinidad and Tobago	5:52.67	+2:52.59	
154	144	Charbel Neemeh	Lebanon	5:53.46	+2:53.38	
155	140	Nikola Petkovski	North Macedonia	6:00.40	+3:00.32	
156	158	Eduardo Arteaga	Venezuela	6:05.74	+3:05.66	
	139	Salim Lozom	Lebanon	Did not finish		
	52	Russell Kennedy	Canada	Did not start		
	157	André Gonçalves	Portugal	Did not start		

=== Quarterfinals ===
The top two of each heat and the two best-timed skiers advanced to the semifinals.

==== Quarterfinal 1 ====
Rank	Seed	Athlete	Country	Time	Deficit	Notes
1	1	Johannes Høsflot Klæbo	Norway	2:58.84		Q
2	2	Erik Valnes	Norway	2.59.08	+0.24	Q
3	26	Ristomatti Hakola	Finland	2:59.59	+0.75	
4	15	Marcus Grate	Sweden	2:59.90	+1.06	
5	29	Valentin Chauvin	France	2:59.94	+1.10	
6	30	Anton Persson	Sweden	3.09.90	+11.06	

==== Quarterfinal 2 ====
Rank	Seed	Athlete	Country	Time	Deficit	Notes
1	10	Alexander Bolshunov	Russian Ski Federation	2:58.20		Q
2	28	Oskar Svensson	Sweden	2:58.39	+0.19	Q
3	4	Pål Golberg	Norway	2:58.62	+0.42	LL
4	13	Jovian Hediger	Switzerland	2:58.71	+0.51	LL
5	17	Lucas Chanavat	France	3:01.20	+3.00	
6	20	James Clinton Schoonmaker	United States	3:09.89	+11.69	

==== Quarterfinal 3 ====
Rank	Seed	Athlete	Country	Time	Deficit	Notes
1	16	Emil Iversen	Norway	3:02.67		Q
2	9	Sergey Ustiugov	Russian Ski Federation	3:03.31	+0.64	Q
3	8	Alexander Terentyev	Russian Ski Federation	3:03.47	+0.80	
4	23	Johan Häggström	Sweden	3:03.49	+0.82	
5	18	Michal Novák	Czech Republic	3:03.64	+0.97	
6	21	Maicol Rastelli	Italy	3:05.14	+2.47	

==== Quarterfinal 4 ====
Rank	Seed	Athlete	Country	Time	Deficit	Notes
1	6	Håvard Solås Taugbøl	Norway	3:01.27		Q
2	3	Federico Pellegrino	Italy	3:01.35	+0.08	Q
3	7	Joni Mäki	Finland	3:01.39	+0.12	
4	25	Marko Kilp	Estonia	3:05.79	+4.52	
5	22	Luděk Šeller	Czech Republic	3:10.25	+8.98	
6	27	Janosch Brugger	Germany	3:11.27	+10.00	

==== Quarterfinal 5 ====
Rank	Seed	Athlete	Country	Time	Deficit	Notes
1	5	Gleb Retivykh	Russian Ski Federation	3:05.21		Q
2	19	Richard Jouve	France	3:05.45	+0.24	Q
3	12	Lauri Vuorinen	Finland	3:06.48	+0.87	
4	11	Ben Ogden	United States	3:09.15	+3.94	
5	14	Ondřej Černý	Czech Republic	3:19.99	+14.78	
6	24	Francesco De Fabiani	Italy	RAL	+29.78	

=== Semifinals ===
The top two of each heat and the two best-timed skiers advanced to the final.

==== Semifinal 1 ====
Rank	Seed	Athlete	Country	Time	Deficit	Notes
1	1	Johannes Høsflot Klæbo	Norway	2:59.28		Q
2	2	Erik Valnes	Norway	2:59.40	+0.12	Q
3	10	Alexander Bolshunov	Russian Ski Federation	2:59.78	+0.50	LL
4	28	Oskar Svensson	Sweden	2:59.95	+0.67	LL
5	16	Emil Iversen	Norway	3:00.36	+1.08	
6	13	Jovian Hediger	Switzerland	3:09.58	+10.30	

==== Semifinal 2 ====
Rank	Seed	Athlete	Country	Time	Deficit	Notes
1	6	Håvard Solås Taugbøl	Norway	3:04.78		Q
2	9	Sergey Ustiugov	Russian Ski Federation	3:05.67	+0.89	Q
3	19	Richard Jouve	France	3:05.99	+1.21	
4	4	Pål Golberg	Norway	3:06.14	+1.36	
5	5	Gleb Retivykh	Russian Ski Federation	3:06.44	+1.66	
6	3	Federico Pellegrino	Italy	3:06.51	+1.73	

=== Final ===
Rank	Seed	Athlete	Country	Time	Deficit	Notes
1st place, gold medalist(s)	1	Johannes Høsflot Klæbo	Norway	3:01.30		
2nd place, silver medalist(s)	2	Erik Valnes	Norway	3:01.96	+0.66	
3rd place, bronze medalist(s)	6	Håvard Solås Taugbøl	Norway	3:02.10	+0.80	
4	10	Alexander Bolshunov	Russian Ski Federation	3:07.22	+5.92	
5	9	Sergey Ustiugov	Russian Ski Federation	3:18.71	+17.41	
6	28	Oskar Svensson	Sweden	3:21.79	+20.49	
