= Luděk Šeller =

Czech cross-country skier

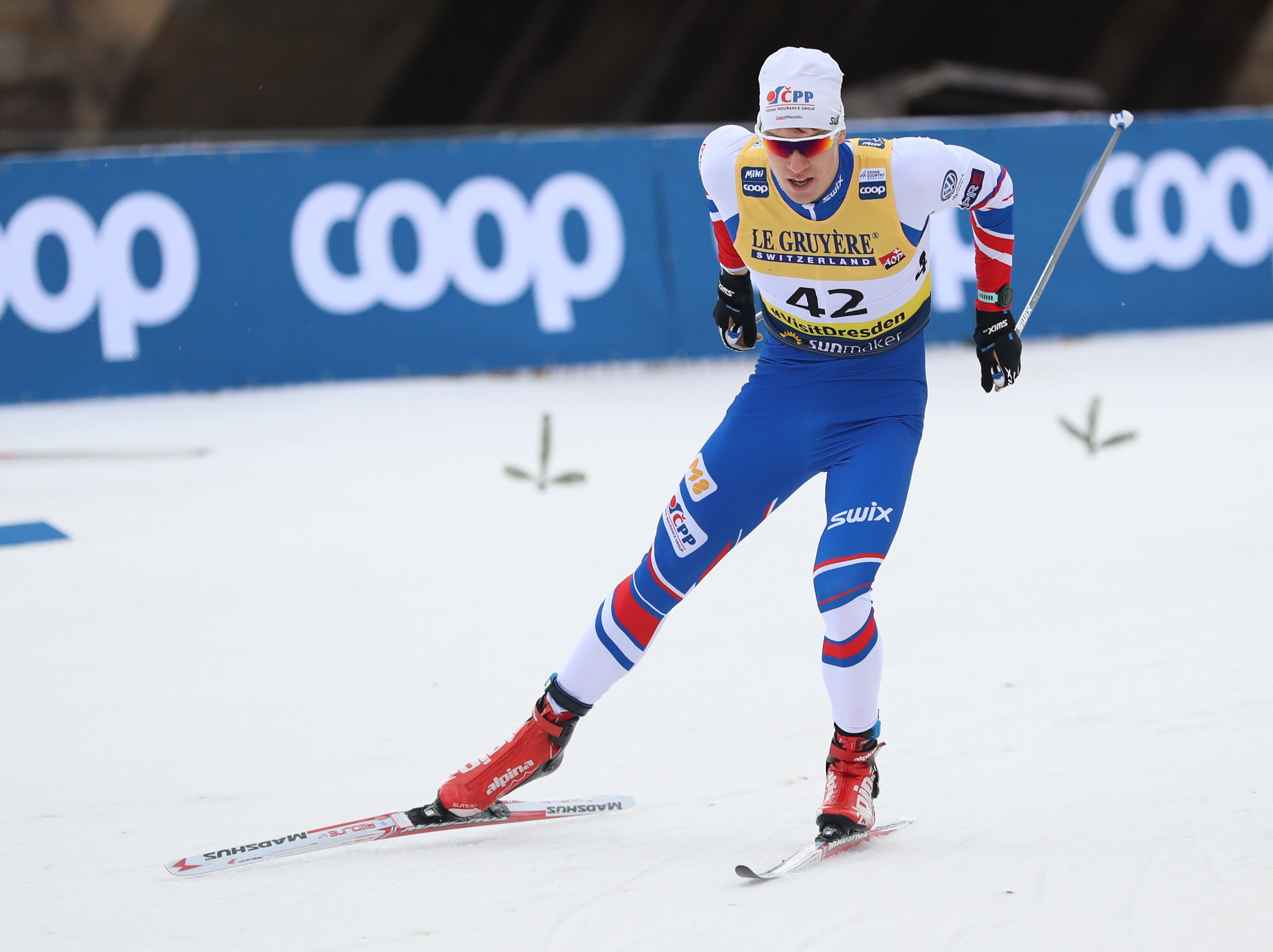
- Šeller in 2019

Personal information
- Nationality: Czech Republic
- Born: 11 July 1995 (age 31) Domažlice, Czech Republic

Sport
- Sport: Skiing
- Club: SC Plzeň

World Cup career
- Seasons: 7 – (2014, 2018–present)
- Indiv. starts: 38
- Indiv. podiums: 0
- Team starts: 8
- Team podiums: 0
- Overall titles: 0 – (69th in 2023)
- Discipline titles: 0
- Updated on 29 March 2023

Luděk Šeller (born 11 July 1995) is a Czech cross-country skier. He competed in the sprint at the 2022 Winter Olympics.

== Cross-country skiing results ==
Šeller in 2020

All results are sourced from the International Ski Federation (FIS).

=== Olympic Games ===
Year	Age	15 km individual	30 km skiathlon	50 km mass start	Sprint	4 × 10 km relay	Team sprint
2022	26	—	—	—^{[a]}	29	—	14

^{a} Distance reduced to 30 km due to weather conditions.

=== World Championships ===
Year	Age	15 km individual	30 km skiathlon	50 km mass start	Sprint	4 × 10 km relay	Team sprint
2019	23	—	—	—	56	—	—
2021	25	—	—	—	24	—	8
2023	27	—	—	—	23	15	9

=== World Cup ===
==== Season standings ====
Season	Age	Discipline standings				Ski Tour standings			
Season	Age	Overall	Distance	Sprint	U23	Nordic Opening	Tour de Ski	Ski Tour 2020	World Cup Final
2014	18	NC	—	NC	—N/a	—	—	—N/a	—
2018	22	NC	—	NC	NC	—	—	—N/a	—
2019	23	NC	—	NC	—N/a	—	—	—N/a	—
2020	24	NC	NC	NC	—N/a	DNF	—	—	—N/a
2021	25	80	—	40	—N/a	DNF	—	—N/a	—N/a
2022	26	86	—	49	—N/a	—N/a	—	—N/a	—N/a
2023	27	69	NC	29	—N/a	—N/a	—	—N/a	—N/a
