= Richard Jouve =

French cross-country skier (born 1994)

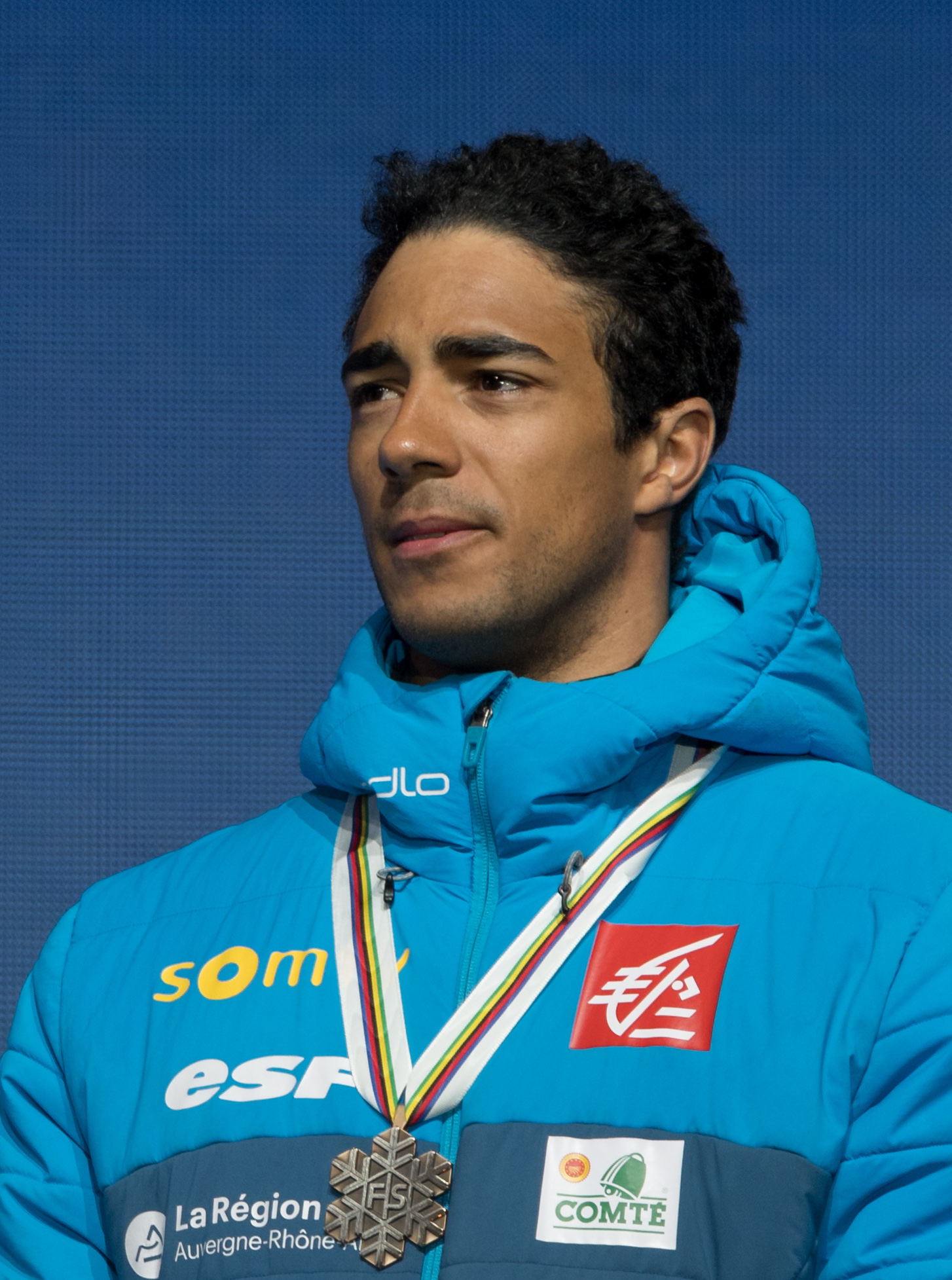
- Jouve in March 2019

Personal information
- Nationality: France
- Born: 25 October 1994 (age 31) Briançon, France
- Height: 1.75 m (5 ft 9 in)

Sport
- Sport: Skiing
- Club: SC Montgenèvre Val Clarée

World Cup career
- Seasons: 12 – (2015–2026)
- Indiv. starts: 157
- Indiv. podiums: 20
- Indiv. wins: 4
- Team starts: 19
- Team podiums: 5
- Team wins: 1
- Overall titles: 0 – (4th in 2022)
- Discipline titles: 1 – (SP in 2022)
Medal record
Men's cross-country skiing
Representing France
Olympic Games
Bronze medal – third place	2018 Pyeongchang	Team sprint
Bronze medal – third place	2022 Beijing	4 × 10 km relay
World Championships
Bronze medal – third place	2019 Seefeld	4 × 10 km relay
Bronze medal – third place	2023 Planica	Team sprint
Junior World Championships
Silver medal – second place	2014 Val di Fiemme	4 × 5 km relay
- Updated on 22 March 2026

Richard Jouve (French pronunciation: [ʁiʃaʁ ʒuv]; born 25 October 1994) is a French cross-country skier who has competed since 2015. He won the 2021–22 Sprint World Cup as the first Frenchman to win a discipline globe at the FIS Cross-Country World Cup.

== Career ==
Jouve, having competed in only three previous World Cup races, placed 3rd in the freestyle sprint at Lahti in 2015. In 2016, at Planica he again placed third, finishing behind Federico Pellegrino and countryman Baptiste Gros. In the team sprint the next day, Jouve and Valentin Chauvin placed third again behind Gros and Renaud Jay to end a strong weekend for the French. Jouve closed out his 2016 season by finishing second in the sprint at Gatineau.

Jouve won the sprint event at the 2016 Blink ski festival.

== Personal life ==
Jouve was born in France to a French father and Djiboutian mother.

== Cross-country skiing results ==
All results are sourced from the International Ski Federation (FIS).

=== Olympic Games ===
- 2 medals – (2 bronze)

Year	Age	15 km individual	30 km skiathlon	50 km mass start	Sprint	4 × 10 km relay	Team sprint
2018	23	—	—	—	16	—	Bronze
2022	27	49	—	—^{[a]}	7	Bronze	7
2026	31	—	—	—	24	—	—

^{a} Distance reduced to 30 km due to weather conditions.

=== World Championships ===
- 2 medals – (2 bronze)

Year	Age	15 km individual	30 km skiathlon	50 km mass start	Sprint	4 × 10 km relay	Team sprint
2017	22	—	—	—	16	—	11
2019	24	—	—	—	4	Bronze	5
2021	26	—	—	—	7	—	4
2023	28	—	—	—	14	4	Bronze
2025	30	—	—	—	8	—	5

=== World Cup ===
==== Season titles ====
- 1 title – (1 sprint)

Season	Discipline
2022	Sprint

==== Season standings ====
Season	Age	Discipline standings				Ski Tour standings				
Season	Age	Overall	Distance	Sprint	U23	Nordic Opening	Tour de Ski	Ski Tour 2020	World Cup Final	Ski Tour Canada
2015	20	76	—	34	7	—	—	—N/a	—N/a	—N/a
2016	21	39	86	16	3rd place, bronze medalist(s)	—	—	—N/a	—N/a	45
2017	22	64	NC	24	5	DNF	—	—N/a	DNF	—N/a
2018	23	33	NC	8	—N/a	DNF	DNF	—N/a	DNF	—N/a
2019	24	27	91	9	—N/a	DNF	DNF	—N/a	25	—N/a
2020	25	33	NC	11	—N/a	55	DNF	DNF	—N/a	—N/a
2021	26	27	63	6	—N/a	65	45	—N/a	—N/a	—N/a
2022	27	4	43	1st place, gold medalist(s)	—N/a	—N/a	DNF	—N/a	—N/a	—N/a
2023	28	11	50	6	—N/a	—N/a	DNF	—N/a	—N/a	—N/a
2024	29	25	40	14	—N/a	—N/a	—	—N/a	—N/a	—N/a
2025	30	27	67	14	—N/a	—N/a	DNF	—N/a	—N/a	—N/a
2026	31	100	104	58	—N/a	—N/a	55	—N/a	—N/a	—N/a

==== Individual podiums ====
- 4 victories – (4 WC)
- 20 podiums – (13 WC, 7 SWC)

No.	Season	Date	Location	Race	Level	Place
1	2014–15	7 March 2015	Lahti, Finland	1.5 km Sprint F	World Cup	3rd
2	2015–16	16 January 2016	Planica, Slovenia	1.2 km Sprint F	World Cup	3rd
3	2015–16	1 March 2016	Gatineau, Canada	1.7 km Sprint F	Stage World Cup	2nd
4	2016–17	17 March 2017	Quebec City, Canada	1.5 km Sprint F	Stage World Cup	3rd
5	2018–19	29 December 2018	Toblach, Italy	1.3 km Sprint F	Stage World Cup	2nd
6	2018–19	12 March 2019	Drammen, Norway	1.2 km Sprint C	World Cup	3rd
7	2019–20	29 November 2019	Rukatunturi, Finland	1.4 km Sprint C	Stage World Cup	3rd
8	2019–20	29 December 2019	Lenzerheide, Switzerland	1.5 km Sprint F	Stage World Cup	3rd
9	2020–21	1 January 2021	Val Müstair, Switzerland	1.4 km Sprint F	Stage World Cup	3rd
10	2021–22	3 December 2021	Lillehammer, Norway	1.6 km Sprint F	World Cup	3rd
11	2021–22	11 December 2021	Davos, Switzerland	1.5 km Sprint F	World Cup	3rd
12	2021–22	28 December 2021	Lenzerheide, Switzerland	1.5 km Sprint F	Stage World Cup	2nd
13	2021–22	3 March 2022	Drammen, Norway	1.2 km Sprint C	World Cup	1st
14	2021–22	11 March 2022	Falun, Sweden	1.4 km Sprint C	World Cup	1st
15	2022–23	9 December 2022	Beitostølen, Norway	1.3 km Sprint C	World Cup	1st
16	2022–23	21 January 2023	Livigno, Italy	1.2 km Sprint F	World Cup	2nd
17	2022–23	28 January 2023	Les Rousses, France	1.3 km Sprint C	World Cup	1st
18	2022–23	14 March 2023	Drammen, Norway	1.2 km Sprint C	World Cup	3rd
19	2023–24	24 November 2023	Rukatunturi, Finland	1.4 km Sprint C	World Cup	2nd
20	2023–24	13 February 2024	Canmore, Canada	1.3 km Sprint C	World Cup	2nd

==== Team podiums ====
- 1 victory – (1 TS)
- 5 podiums – (5 TS)

No.	Season	Date	Location	Race	Level	Place	Teammate
1	2015–16	17 January 2016	Planica, Slovenia	6 × 1.2 km Team Sprint F	World Cup	3rd	Chauvin
2	2020–21	20 December 2020	(Germany) Dresden, Italy	6 × 1.3 km Team Sprint F	World Cup	2nd	Chanavat
3	2022–23	22 January 2023	Livigno, Italy	6 × 1.2 km Team Sprint F	World Cup	1st	Jay
4	2024–25	31 January 2025	Cogne, Italy	6 × 1.3 km Team Sprint C	World Cup	2nd	Chappaz
5	2024–25	22 March 2025	Lahti, Finland	6 × 1.5 km Team Sprint F	World Cup	3rd	Chappaz
