= Niilo Moilanen =

Finnish cross-country skier (born 2001)

Personal information
- Nationality: Finland
- Born: 17 May 2001 (age 25) Oulu, Finland

Sport
- Sport: Skiing
- Club: Pohti Ski Team

World Cup career
- Seasons: 4 – (2022–present)
Medal record
Men's cross-country skiing
Representing Finland
World U23 Championships
Gold medal – first place	2021 Vuokatti	Sprint classical
Silver medal – second place	2021 Vuokatti	4 × 5 km relay
- Updated on 14 November 2026

Niilo Moilanen (born 17 May 2001) is a Finnish cross-country skier. He is best known for winning a gold medal at the 2021 Nordic Junior World Ski Championships.

== Career ==
At the Junior World Championships he competed in 2020, 2021 and 2022 (U23). In 2021, staged on home soil in Vuokatti, Moilanen won a silver medal in the relay and the gold medal in the sprint race. He was the first Finnish man to win the Junior World Championships sprint, with two women having managed the feat earlier. Moilanen profited from the race being staged in the classical style, which was his strongest style.

He made his World Cup debut in November 2021 in Ruka, collecting his first World Cup points with a 22nd place in the sprint which he then repeated in December in Lillehammer. His break into the top 20 came in the 2022–23 FIS Cross-Country World Cup, again in Ruka when finishing 18th, followed by an 8th place in Beitostølen in December. After Lillehammer, Moilanen managed to finish in the top 30 in every single World Cup race, with 12th being his second best. One of his weaker results came on home soil, in the World Cup closer in Lahti, where he fell three times and was knocked out of the sprint early.

Moilanen competed at the 2023 World Championships, finishing 21st in the sprint and 11th in the team sprint. During the 2023–24 FIS Cross-Country World Cup, his best finish was 11th in the sprint in Canmore. In the summer of 2024 he crashed with a cyclist while roller skiing, sustaining several fractures to the face and jaw.
