= Maciej Staręga =

Polish cross-country skier (born 1990)

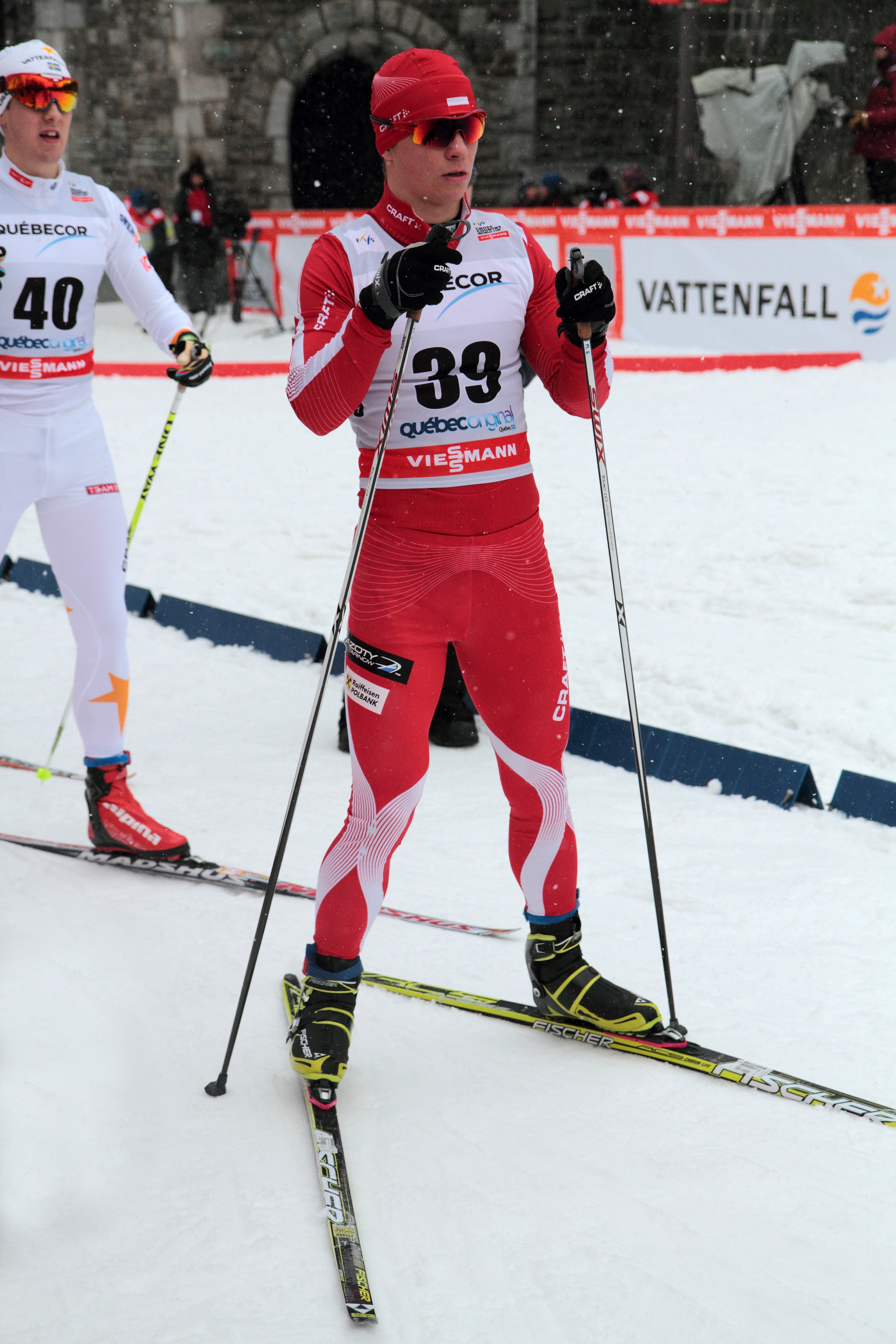
- Staręga in 2012

Personal information
- Nationality: Poland
- Born: 31 January 1990 (age 36) Siedlce, Poland

Sport
- Sport: Skiing
- Club: UKS RAWA Siedlce

World Cup career
- Seasons: 13 – (2011–present)
- Indiv. starts: 170
- Indiv. podiums: 0
- Team starts: 20
- Team podiums: 0
- Overall titles: 0 – (44th in 2023)
- Discipline titles: 0
- Updated on 29 March 2023

Maciej Staręga (born 31 January 1990, in Siedlce) is a Polish cross-country skier. He competed at the FIS Nordic World Ski Championships 2013 in Val di Fiemme, the 2014 Winter Olympics in Sochi, in 15 kilometre classical and 4 × 10 kilometre relay and the 2018 Winter Olympics in Pyeongchang.

He married Polish biathlete Monika Hojnisz in June 2019.

== Cross-country skiing results ==
All results are sourced from the International Ski Federation (FIS).

=== Olympic Games ===
Year	Age	15 km individual	30 km skiathlon	50 km mass start	Sprint	4 × 10 km relay	Team sprint
2014	24	66	—	—	67	15	15
2018	28	82	—	—	39	—	13
2022	32	—	—	—^{[a]}	19	—	15

^{a} Distance reduced to 30 km due to weather conditions.

=== World Championships ===
Year	Age	15 km individual	30 km skiathlon	50 km mass start	Sprint	4 × 10 km relay	Team sprint
2011	21	54	—	—	33	—	18
2013	23	57	—	—	41	16	12
2015	25	48	—	—	38	15	8
2017	27	DNF	—	—	8	15	10
2019	29	59	—	—	30	—	18
2021	31	—	—	—	33	14	10
2023	33	61	—	—	49	—	8

=== World Cup ===
==== Season standings ====
Season	Age	Discipline standings			Ski Tour standings				
Season	Age	Overall	Distance	Sprint	Nordic Opening	Tour de Ski	Ski Tour 2020	World Cup Final	Ski Tour Canada
2011	21	171	NC	109	65	—	—N/a	—	—N/a
2012	22	NC	NC	NC	94	DNF	—N/a	—	—N/a
2013	23	130	NC	75	DNF	DNF	—N/a	—	—N/a
2014	24	59	NC	23	DNF	DNF	—N/a	—	—N/a
2015	25	70	NC	30	79	DNF	—N/a	—N/a	—N/a
2016	26	65	NC	29	56	DNF	—N/a	—N/a	DNF
2017	27	57	NC	22	DNF	DNF	—N/a	69	—N/a
2018	28	90	NC	45	DNF	—	—N/a	72	—N/a
2019	29	96	NC	49	DNF	DNF	—N/a	—	—N/a
2020	30	120	NC	72	76	DNF	DNF	—N/a	—N/a
2021	31	118	NC	71	DNF	DNF	—N/a	—N/a	—N/a
2022	32	69	NC	34	—N/a	DNF	—N/a	—N/a	—N/a
2023	33	44	NC	19	—N/a	DNF	—N/a	—N/a	—N/a
