= Cross-country skiing at the 2022 Winter Olympics – Men's team sprint =

Men’s team sprint at the XXIV Olympic Winter Games
- Cross-country skiing
- Venue: Kuyangshu Nordic Center and Biathlon Center, Zhangjiakou
- Date: 16 February 2022
- Competitors: 50 from 25 nations
- Teams: 25
- Winning time: 19:22.99

Medalists
1st place, gold medalist(s)		Erik Valnes; Johannes Høsflot Klæbo	Norway
2nd place, silver medalist(s)		Iivo Niskanen; Joni Mäki	Finland
3rd place, bronze medalist(s)		Alexander Bolshunov; Alexander Terentyev	ROC

The men’s team sprint competition in cross-country skiing at the 2022 Winter Olympics was held on 16 February, at the Kuyangshu Nordic Center and Biathlon Center in Zhangjiakou. Erik Valnes and Johannes Høsflot Klæbo of Norway won the event. Iivo Niskanen and Joni Mäki of Finland won the silver medal, and Alexander Bolshunov and Alexander Terentyev, representing the Russian Olympic Committee, bronze.

== Summary ==
The defending champions are Martin Johnsrud Sundby and Johannes Høsflot Klæbo, with Klaebo qualifying for these games. The silver medalists, Alexander Bolshunov and Denis Spitsov, as well as the bronze medalists, Maurice Manificat and Richard Jouve, qualified as well. The overall leader of the 2021–22 FIS Cross-Country World Cup before the Olympics, as well as the sprint leader, was Klæbo. Thomas Helland Larsen and Even Northug won the only team sprint event of the season. Erik Valnes and Klæbo are the 2021 World Champions in team sprint. The Russian duo of Bolshunov and Alexander Terentyev are also highly touted.

In the final, the first four legs all teams skied together, with only Austria being behind and out of medal contention. At the fifth interchange, Norway, Finland and the Russian Olympic Committee teams were separated by less than a second, and the fourth team, Sweden, were 8 seconds behind. Norway's Valnes, ROC's Bolshunov and Finland's Iivo Niskanen, the 15 km classical champion from these Olympics, gave their respective teammates a head start into the final leg. Unsurpisingly, these three teams became the medalists. Klæbo, who earlier became the individual sprint champion at these Olympics ahead of Terentyev and Joni Mäki, who were third and fourth in that competition, was the fastest of the three, and Norway won gold. Behind him, Mäki edged ahead of Terentyev to claim the silver medal for Finland.

== Results ==
=== Semifinals ===
Rank	Heat	Bib	Country	Athletes	Time	Notes
1	1	1	Norway	Erik Valnes; Johannes Høsflot Klæbo	20:17.28	Q
2	1	3	France	Hugo Lapalus; Richard Jouve	20:17.36	Q
3	1	2	Finland	Iivo Niskanen; Joni Mäki	20:17.81	Q
4	1	7	Canada	Antoine Cyr; Graham Ritchie	20:18.71	Q
5	1	11	Estonia	Henri Roos; Martin Himma	20:24.29	
6	1	9	Belarus	Aliaksandr Voranau; Yahor Shpuntau	20:34.07	
7	1	5	Czech Republic	Luděk Šeller; Michal Novák	20:36.70	
8	1	8	Slovenia	Vili Črv; Miha Šimenc	20:43.03	
9	1	6	Romania	Paul Pepene; Raul Popa	21:03.35	
10	1	4	Great Britain	James Clugnet; Andrew Young	21:15.27	
11	1	12	Australia	Phillip Bellingham; Seve de Campo	21:17.35	
12	1	13	Lithuania	Modestas Vaičiulis; Tautvydas Strolia	22:17.79	
13	1	10	South Korea	Kim Min-woo; Jeong Jong-won	22:56.16	
1	2	15	Italy	Francesco De Fabiani; Federico Pellegrino	20:06.99	Q
2	2	16	Sweden	William Poromaa; Oskar Svensson	20:07.57	Q
3	2	17	Switzerland	Jonas Baumann; Jovian Hediger	20:07.67	Q
4	2	21	Austria	Michael Föttinger; Benjamin Moser	20:07.78	Q
5	2	14	ROC	Alexander Bolshunov; Alexander Terentyev	20:07.85	LL
6	2	19	United States	Ben Ogden; JC Schoonmaker	20:11.42	LL
7	2	20	China	Wang Qiang; Shang Jincai	20:12.40	
8	2	23	Poland	Maciej Staręga; Kamil Bury	20:19.87	
9	2	24	Ukraine	Oleksiy Krasovsky; Ruslan Perekhoda	20:48.40	
10	2	25	Iceland	Snorri Einarsson; Isak Stianson Pedersen	21:05.66	
11	2	22	Latvia	Raimo Vīgants; Roberts Slotiņš	21:06.82	
12	2	18	Germany	Albert Kuchler; Janosch Brugger	21:20.39	

=== Final ===
Rank	Bib	Country	Athletes	Time	Deficit
1st place, gold medalist(s)	1	Norway	Erik Valnes; Johannes Høsflot Klæbo	19:22.99	—
2nd place, silver medalist(s)	2	Finland	Iivo Niskanen; Joni Mäki	19:25.45	+2.46
3rd place, bronze medalist(s)	14	ROC	Alexander Bolshunov; Alexander Terentyev	19:27.28	+4.29
4	16	Sweden	William Poromaa; Oskar Svensson	19:38.05	+15.06
5	7	Canada	Antoine Cyr; Graham Ritchie	19:45.30	+22.31
6	15	Italy	Francesco De Fabiani; Federico Pellegrino	19:48.42	+25.43
7	3	France	Hugo Lapalus; Richard Jouve	19:58.37	+35.38
8	17	Switzerland	Jonas Baumann; Jovian Hediger	20:04.35	+41.36
9	19	United States	Ben Ogden; JC Schoonmaker	20:28.07	+1:05.08
10	21	Austria	Michael Föttinger; Benjamin Moser	21:15.00	+1:52.01
