= FIS Nordic World Ski Championships 2023 – Men's team sprint =

Men's team sprint at the FIS Nordic World Ski Championships 2023
- Venue: Planica Nordic Centre
- Location: Planica, Slovenia
- Dates: 26 February
- Competitors: 68 from 34 nations
- Teams: 34
- Winning time: 17:28.14

Medalists
gold medal	Pål Golberg; Johannes Høsflot Klæbo	Norway
silver medal	Francesco De Fabiani; Federico Pellegrino	Italy
bronze medal	Renaud Jay; Richard Jouve	France

The Men's team sprint competition at the FIS Nordic World Ski Championships 2023 was held on 26 February 2023.

== Results ==
=== Qualification ===
The qualification was started at 11:45.

Rank	Bib	Country	Athletes	Time	Deficit	Notes
1	1	Norway	Pål Golberg; Johannes Høsflot Klæbo	5:21.43		Q
2	3	Sweden	Calle Halfvarsson; Edvin Anger	5:28.94	+7.51	Q
3	9	United States	JC Schoonmaker; Ben Ogden	5:29.89	+8.46	Q
4	13	Poland	Maciej Staręga; Dominik Bury	5:30.85	+9.42	Q
5	4	Finland	Niilo Moilanen; Joni Mäki	5:31.14	+9.71	Q
6	2	Italy	Francesco De Fabiani; Federico Pellegrino	5:31.72	+10.29	Q
7	6	France	Renaud Jay; Richard Jouve	5:32.66	+11.23	Q
8	7	Czech Republic	Luděk Šeller; Michal Novák	5:32.76	+11.33	Q
9	15	Estonia	Marko Kilp; Martin Himma	5:34.38	+12.95	Q
10	8	Canada	Antoine Cyr; Graham Ritchie	5:35.21	+13.78	Q
11	12	Switzerland	Roman Schaad; Janik Riebli	5:35.87	+14.44	Q
12	10	Great Britain	James Clugnet; Andrew Young	5:37.52	+16.09	Q
13	19	Slovenia	Vili Črv; Miha Šimenc	5:38.47	+17.04	Q
14	16	Austria	Benjamin Moser; Lukas Mrkonjic	5:39.01	+17.58	Q
15	5	Germany	Friedrich Moch; Janosch Brugger	5:39.69	+18.26	Q
16	11	Japan	Takanori Ebina; Haruki Yamashita	5:43.89	+22.46	
17	20	Latvia	Raimo Vīgants; Lauris Kaparkalējs	5:44.24	+22.81	
18	22	Australia	Lars Young Vik; Seve de Campo	5:49.15	+27.72	
19	14	Romania	Paul Constantin Pepene; Raul Mihai Popa	5:54.23	+32.80	
20	29	Lithuania	Modestas Vaičiulis; Tautvydas Strolia	5:54.55	+33.12	
21	17	Kazakhstan	Konstantin Bortsov; Svyatoslav Matassov	5:54.89	+33.46	
22	21	Iceland	Snorri Einarsson; Dagur Benediktsson	5:56.11	+34.68	
23	18	Bulgaria	Daniel Peshkov; Simeon Deyanov	6:01.76	+40.33	
24	23	Ukraine	Dmytro Drahun; Oleksandr Lisohor	6:03.71	+42.28	
25	27	Croatia	Marko Skender; Petar Perušić	6:08.96	+47.53	
26	28	Argentina	Franco Dal Farra; Mateo Lorenzo Sauma	6:10.77	+49.34	
27	26	Hungary	Ádám Kónya; Kristóf Lágler	6:12.51	+51.08	
28	25	Bosnia and Herzegovina	Strahinja Erić; Miloš Stević	6:14.81	+53.38	
29	31	Greece	Nikolaos Tsourekas; Apostolos Angelis	6:18.52	+57.09	
30	30	Turkey	Yusuf Emre Fırat; Yusuf Talay	6:22.50	+1:01.07	
31	32	Haiti	Theo Mallett; Stevenson Savart	6:30.37	+1:08.94	
32	24	North Macedonia	Stavre Jada; Darko Damjanovski	6:36.98	+1:15.55	
33	33	Chile	Sebastian Endrestad; Juan Luis Uberuaga	6:46.34	+1:24.91	
34	34	Portugal	José Cabeça; Filipe Cabrita	7:47.78	+2:26.35	

=== Final ===
The race was started at 14:00.

Rank	Bib	Country	Athletes	Time	Deficit	Notes
1st place, gold medalist(s)	1	Norway	Pål Golberg; Johannes Høsflot Klæbo	17:28.14		
2nd place, silver medalist(s)	2	Italy	Francesco De Fabiani; Federico Pellegrino	17:30.62	+2.48	
3rd place, bronze medalist(s)	6	France	Renaud Jay; Richard Jouve	17:44.62	+16.48	
4	8	Canada	Antoine Cyr; Graham Ritchie	17:51.09	+22.95	
5	3	Sweden	Calle Halfvarsson; Edvin Anger	17:57.72	+29.58	
6	10	Great Britain	James Clugnet; Andrew Young	18:00.66	+32.52	
7	5	Germany	Friedrich Moch; Janosch Brugger	18:05.68	+37.54	
8	13	Poland	Maciej Staręga; Dominik Bury	18:07.84	+39.70	
9	7	Czech Republic	Luděk Šeller; Michal Novák	18:11.30	+43.16	
10	9	United States	JC Schoonmaker; Ben Ogden	18:12.87	+44.73	
11	4	Finland	Niilo Moilanen; Joni Mäki	18:26.52	+58.38	
12	15	Estonia	Marko Kilp; Martin Himma	18:33.86	+1:05.72	
13	12	Switzerland	Roman Schaad; Janik Riebli	18:42.23	+1:14.09	
14	19	Slovenia	Vili Črv; Miha Šimenc	18:55.07	+1:26.93	
15	16	Austria	Benjamin Moser; Lukas Mrkonjic	19:10.00	+1:41.86	
