= FIS Nordic World Ski Championships 2021 – Men's team sprint =

Men's team sprint at the FIS Nordic World Ski Championships 2021
- Location: Oberstdorf, Germany
- Date: 28 February
- Competitors: 72 from 36 nations
- Teams: 36
- Winning time: 15:01.74

Medalists
gold medal	Erik Valnes; Johannes Høsflot Klæbo	Norway
silver medal	Ristomatti Hakola; Joni Mäki	Finland
bronze medal	Alexander Bolshunov; Gleb Retivykh

The Men's team sprint competition at the FIS Nordic World Ski Championships 2021 was held on 28 February 2021.

== Results ==
=== Semifinals ===
==== Semifinal A ====
The semifinal was started at 11:56.

Rank	Bib	Country	Athletes	Time	Deficit	Notes
1	1	Norway	Erik Valnes; Johannes Høsflot Klæbo	14:30.19		Q
2	2	Russian Ski Federation	Alexander Bolshunov; Gleb Retivykh	14:30.31	+0.12	Q
3	4	Sweden	Karl-Johan Westberg; Oskar Svensson	14:30.62	+0.43	Q
4	8	Canada	Antoine Cyr; Graham Ritchie	14:30.80	+0.61	Q
5	7	Poland	Maciej Staręga; Dominik Bury	14:31.69	+1.50	q
6	3	Finland	Ristomatti Hakola; Joni Mäki	14:31.71	+1.52	q
7	5	Great Britain	James Clugnet; Andrew Young	14:32.11	+1.92	
8	9	Estonia	Marko Kilp; Martin Himma	14:38.12	+7.93	
9	15	Australia	Phillip Bellingham; Seve de Campo	14:39.92	+9.73	
10	11	Slovenia	Vili Črv; Janez Lampič	14:40.27	+10.08	
11	12	Ukraine	Dmytro Drahun; Ruslan Perekhoda	14:48.81	+18.62	
12	10	South Korea	Kim Eun-ho; Jeong Jong-won	15:13.33	+43.14	
13	6	Romania	Raul Mihai Popa; Petrică Hogiu	15:13.86	+43.67	
14	17	Hungary	Ádám Kónya; Kristóf Lágler	16:07.88	+1:37.69	
15	19	Denmark	Hjalmar Michelsen; Jacob Weel Rosbo	16:12.54	+1:42.35	
16	14	Greece	Apostolos Angelis; Georgios Anastasiadis	16:15.58	+1:45.39	
17	16	Brazil	Manex Silva; Victor Santos	16:29.33	+1:59.14	
18	13	Turkey	Yusuf Emre Fırat; Amed Oğlağo	16:51.10	+2:20.91	
19	18	Mongolia	Otgonlkhagvayn Zolbayar; Batmönkhiin Achbadrakh	17:15.00	+2:44.81	

==== Semifinal B ====
The semifinal was started at 12:24.

Rank	Bib	Country	Athletes	Time	Deficit	Notes
1	20	Italy	Francesco De Fabiani; Federico Pellegrino	14:53.56		Q
2	25	Czech Republic	Luděk Šeller; Michal Novák	14:53.85	+0.29	Q
3	21	France	Lucas Chanavat; Richard Jouve	14:54.24	+0.68	Q
4	22	Switzerland	Jovian Hediger; Roman Furger	14:54.58	+1.02	Q
5	26	Austria	Mika Vermeulen; Benjamin Moser	14:55.44	+1.88	
6	24	Germany	Janosch Brugger; Sebastian Eisenlauer	15:08.93	+15.37	
7	23	United States	Gus Schumacher; Simi Hamilton	15:09.12	+15.56	
8	27	Kazakhstan	Olzhas Klimin; Konstantin Bortsov	15:14.40	+20.84	
9	28	Spain	Ricardo Izquierdo-Bernier; Jaume Pueyo	15:31.74	+38.18	
10	29	Latvia	Indulis Bikše; Raimo Vīgants	15:38.18	+44.62	
11	37	Belgium	Titouan Serot; Thibaut De Marre	15:38.54	+44.98	
12	34	Croatia	Marko Skender; Krešimir Crnković	15:44.26	+50.70	
13	35	Lithuania	Modestas Vaičiulis; Tautvydas Strolia	15:44.60	+51.04	
14	32	Iceland	Snorri Einarsson; Isak Stianson Pedersen	15:50.85	+57.29	
15	33	Bulgaria	Simeon Deyanov; Daniel Peshkov	15:53.35	+59.79	
16	31	Bosnia and Herzegovina	Strahinja Erić; Miloš Čolić	16:40.16	+1:46.60	
	30	Belarus	Yahor Shpuntau; Aliaksandr Voranau	Did not finish		
	36	Serbia	Miloš Milosavljević; Rejhan Šmrković	Did not start		

=== Final ===
The final was started at 13:30.

Rank	Bib	Country	Athletes	Time	Deficit
1st place, gold medalist(s)	1	Norway	Erik Valnes; Johannes Høsflot Klæbo	15:01.74	
2nd place, silver medalist(s)	3	Finland	Ristomatti Hakola; Joni Mäki	15:03.42	+1.68
3rd place, bronze medalist(s)	2	Russian Ski Federation	Alexander Bolshunov; Gleb Retivykh	15:03.83	+2.09
4	21	France	Lucas Chanavat; Richard Jouve	15:15.65	+13.91
5	20	Italy	Francesco De Fabiani; Federico Pellegrino	15:18.40	+16.66
6	4	Sweden	Karl-Johan Westberg; Oskar Svensson	15:18.76	+17.02
7	8	Canada	Antoine Cyr; Graham Ritchie	15:18.80	+17.06
8	25	Czech Republic	Luděk Šeller; Michal Novák	15:27.15	+25.41
9	22	Switzerland	Jovian Hediger; Roman Furger	15:31.38	+29.64
10	7	Poland	Maciej Staręga; Dominik Bury	15:39.14	+37.40
