= Isak Stianson Pedersen =

Icelandic cross-country skier (born 1997)

Personal information
- Nationality: Icelandic
- Born: 4 June 1997 (age 27); Ålesund, Norway

Sport
- Sport: Cross-country skiing

Isak Stianson Pedersen (born 4 June 1997) is an Icelandic cross-country skier. He competed in the 2018 Winter Olympics.
