= Aliaksandr Voranau =

Belarusian cross-country skier (born 1990)

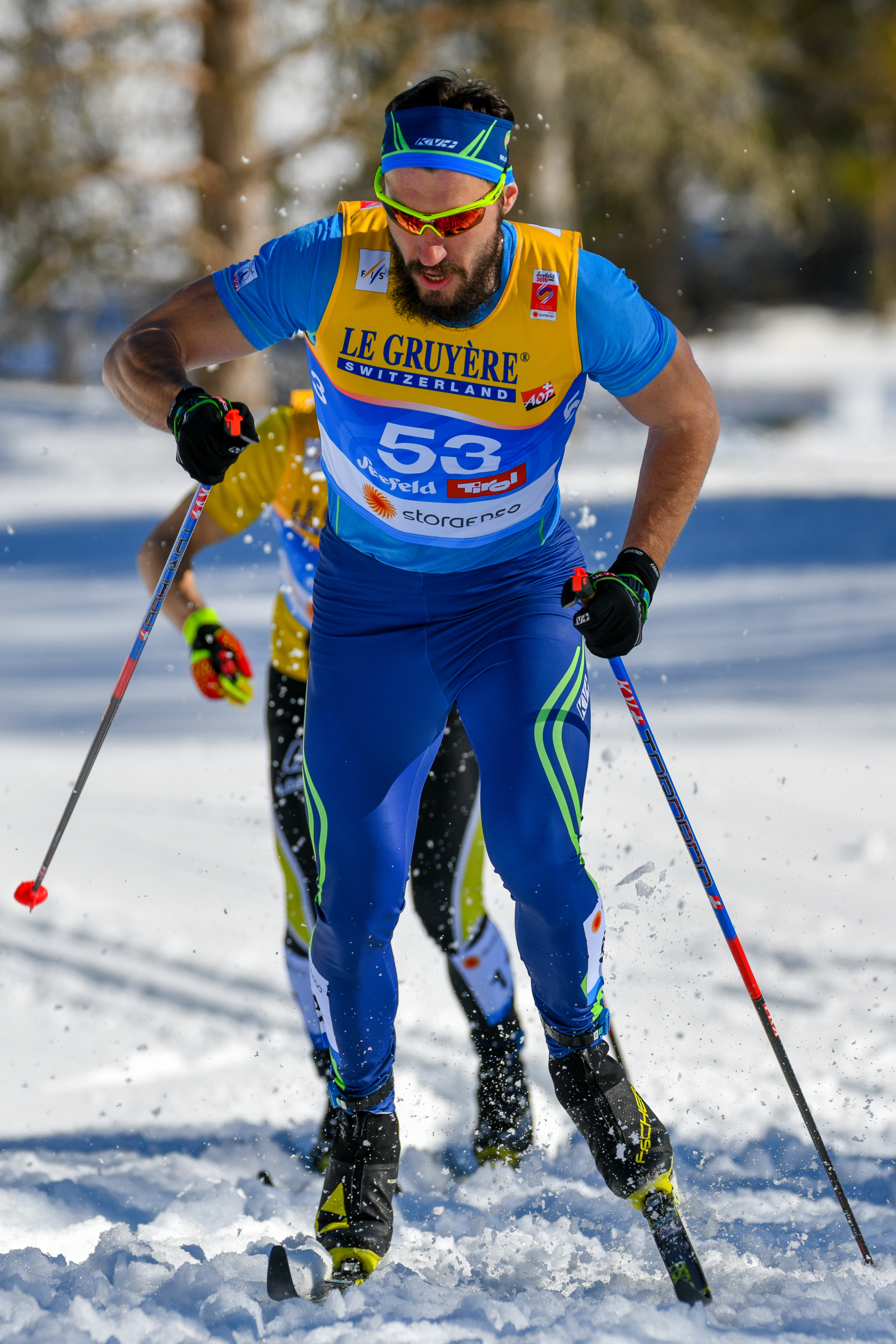
- Voranau in 2019

Personal information
- Born: 15 March 1990 (age 35) Mogilev, Soviet Union (now Belarus)
- Height: 187 cm (6 ft 2 in)

Sport
- Country: Belarusian
- Sport: Skiing

Aliaksandr Voranau (Belarusian: Аляксандар Воранаў; born 15 March 1990) is a Belarusian cross-country skier. He competed in the 2018 Winter Olympics and the 2022 Winter Olympics.
