= 2013 Nordic Opening =

4th edition of the Nordic Opening

2013–14 FIS Cross-Country World Cup

Ski tour details
- Venue(s): Ruka, Finland
- Dates: 29 November–1 December
- Stages: 3: Sprint C 5/10 km C 10/15 km F Pursuit

Results
Men
	Winner	Martin Johnsrud Sundby (NOR)
	Second	Maxim Vylegzhanin (RUS)
	Third	Alexander Legkov (RUS)
Women
	Winner	Marit Bjørgen (NOR)
	Second	Charlotte Kalla (SWE)
	Third	Therese Johaug (NOR)

The 2013 Nordic Opening was the 4th edition of the annual cross-country skiing event. The three-day event was the first competition round of the 2013–14 FIS Cross-Country World Cup.

== World Cup points distribution ==
The winners of the overall standings were awarded 200 World Cup points and the winners of each of the three stages were awarded 50 World Cup points.

Nordic Opening Overall
Position	1	2	3	4	5	6	7	8	9	10	11	12	13	14	15	16	17	18	19	20	21	22	23	24	25	26	27	28	29	30
Points	200	160	120	100	90	80	72	64	58	52	48	44	40	36	32	30	28	26	24	22	20	18	16	14	12	10	8	6	4	2

Nordic Overall Stage
Position	1	2	3	4	5	6	7	8	9	10	11	12	13	14	15	16	17	18	19	20	21	22	23	24	25	26	27	28	29	30
Points	50	46	43	40	37	34	32	30	28	26	24	22	20	18	16	15	14	13	12	11	10	9	8	7	6	5	4	3	2	1

A total of 350 points was possible to achieve if one athlete won all three stages and the overall standings.

== Overall standings ==
Men's Overall standings
Rank	Name	Time
1	(Norway) Martin Johnsrud Sundby	1h 04' 17,3"
2	(Russia) Maxim Vylegzhanin	+ 0,1"
3	(Russia) Alexander Legkov	+ 0,6"
4	(France) Maurice Manificat	+ 4,0"
5	(Russia) Sergey Ustiugov	+ 4,5"
6	(Sweden) Calle Halfvarsson	+ 4,6"
7	(Sweden) Marcus Hellner	+ 11,2"
8	(Norway) Chris Jespersen	+ 11,7"
9	(United States) Noah Hoffman	+ 12,2"
10	(Russia) Alexander Bessmertnykh	+ 12,7"

Women's Overall standings
Rank	Name	Time
1	(Norway) Marit Bjørgen	43' 42,1"
2	(Sweden) Charlotte Kalla	+ 0,8"
3	(Norway) Therese Johaug	+ 1,3"
4	(Poland) Justyna Kowalczyk	+ 30,9"
5	(United States) Kikkan Randall	+ 1' 01,9"
6	(Norway) Astrid Uhrenholdt Jacobsen	+ 1' 02,6"
7	(Russia) Yuliya Chekalyova	+ 1' 03,9"
8	(Germany) Denise Herrmann	+ 1' 38,0"
9	(Norway) Heidi Weng	+ 1' 38,7"
10	(Russia) Yuliya Ivanova	+ 1' 39,1"

== Overall leadership by stage ==
=== Men ===
Stage	Venue	Discipline	Date	Winner	Second	Third	Overall Leader
Nordic Opening (29 November 2013 – 1 December 2013)
1	(Finland) Ruka	Sprint C	29 November 2013	(Norway) Eirik Brandsdal	(Russia) Anton Gafarov	(Sweden) Teodor Peterson	(Norway) Eirik Brandsdal
2	(Finland) Ruka	10 km C	30 November 2013	(Czech Republic) Lukáš Bauer	(Norway) Eldar Rønning	(Russia) Dmitriy Yaparov	(Norway) Eldar Rønning
3	(Finland) Ruka	15 km F Pursuit	1 December 2013	(Norway) Martin Johnsrud Sundby	(Russia) Maxim Vylegzhanin	(Russia) Alexander Legkov	(Norway) Martin Johnsrud Sundby

=== Women ===
Stage	Venue	Discipline	Date	Winner	Second	Third	Overall Leader
Nordic Opening (29 November 2013 – 1 December 2013)
1	(Finland) Ruka	Sprint C	29 November 2013	(Poland) Justyna Kowalczyk	(United States) Kikkan Randall	(Germany) Denise Herrmann	(Poland) Justyna Kowalczyk
2	(Finland) Ruka	5 km C	30 November 2013	(Poland) Justyna Kowalczyk	(Norway) Marit Bjørgen	(Norway) Therese Johaug	(Poland) Justyna Kowalczyk
3	(Finland) Ruka	10 km F Pursuit	1 December 2013	(Sweden) Charlotte Kalla	(Norway) Therese Johaug	(Norway) Marit Bjørgen	(Norway) Marit Bjørgen
