= Petter Eliassen =

Norwegian cross-country skier (born 1985)

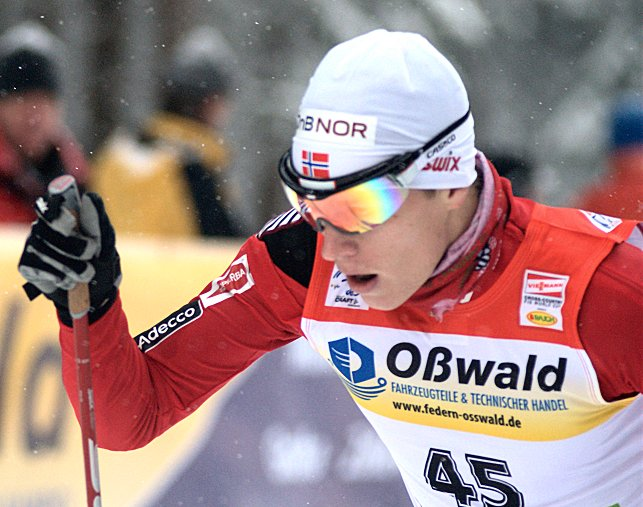
- Petter Eliassen during the Tour de Ski in January 2010

Personal information
- Nationality: Norway
- Born: 1 December 1985 Trondheim, Norway

Sport
- Sport: Skiing
- Club: Byåsen IL; Tverrelvdalen IL

World Cup career
- Seasons: 6 – (2009–2014)
- Indiv. starts: 36
- Indiv. podiums: 0
- Team starts: 5
- Team podiums: 1
- Team wins: 0
- Overall titles: 0 – (35th in 2013)
- Discipline titles: 0
Medal record
Men's cross-country skiing
Representing Norway
U23 World Championships
Bronze medal – third place	2008 Mals	15 km classical

Petter Eliassen (born December 1, 1985) is a Norwegian cross-country skier who has competed since 2004. His best World Cup finish was second in a 4 × 10 km relay event in Finland in March 2010. He won the Vasaloppet in 2015 and 2020, and Birkebeinerrennet in 2015 and 2019.

== Cross-country skiing results ==
All results are sourced from the International Ski Federation (FIS).

=== World Championships ===
Year	Age	15 km individual	30 km skiathlon	50 km mass start	Sprint	4 × 10 km relay	Team sprint
2011	25	15	—	11	—	—	—
2013	27	—	—	14	—	—	—

=== World Cup ===
==== Season standings ====
Season	Age	Discipline standings			Ski Tour standings		
Season	Age	Overall	Distance	Sprint	Nordic Opening	Tour de Ski	World Cup Final
2009	23	150	93	NC	—N/a	—	36
2010	24	102	60	NC	—N/a	DNF	—
2011	25	113	64	—	—	—	—
2012	26	57	35	NC	—	DNF	—
2013	27	35	24	82	—	—	8
2014	28	72	42	—	—	—	—

==== Team podiums ====
- 1 podium – (1 RL)

No.	Season	Date	Location	Race	Level	Place	Teammates
1	2009–10	7 March 2010	Lahti, Finland	4 × 10 km Relay C/F	World Cup	2nd	Rønning / Sundby / Gjerdalen
