= Simi Hamilton =

American cross-country skier

Simeon Hamilton
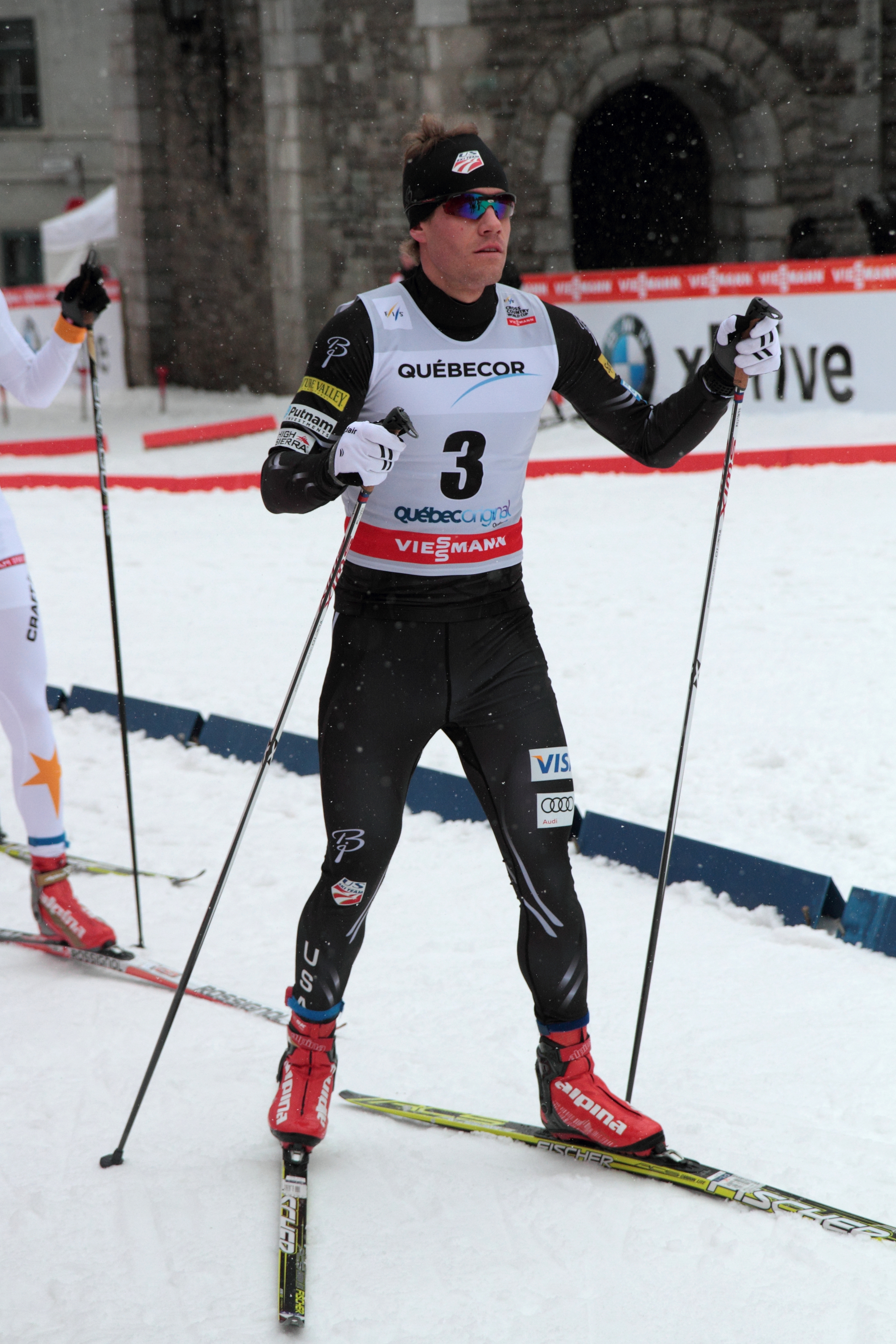

Personal information
- Full name: Simeon Hamilton
- Nationality: United States
- Born: May 14, 1987 (age 39) Aspen, Colorado, United States

Sport
- Sport: Skiing
- Club: Stratton Mountain School

World Cup career
- Seasons: 12 – (2010–2021)
- Indiv. starts: 144
- Indiv. podiums: 4
- Indiv. wins: 1
- Team starts: 23
- Team podiums: 0
- Overall titles: 0 – (30th in 2017)
- Discipline titles: 0
- Updated on 2 November 2021

Simeon "Simi" Hamilton (born May 14, 1987) is an American former cross-country skier, who competed between 2000 and 2021. Hamilton attended Middlebury College from 2005 to 2009, during which time he competed for its ski team, individually earning several All-American NCAA Championship results. It was announced on 29 January 2010 that Hamilton qualified for the 2010 Winter Olympics. Hamilton competed in the 15 kilometer freestyle, 1.5 kilometer classic sprint, and 4x10km relay races. He paced all Americans in the field in the 1.5 kilometer sprint by advancing to the medal rounds and finishing 29th of 96 competitors. In the relay, Hamilton pulled away from the Estonian skier in the anchor leg to secure a 13th-place finish.

On December 31, 2013, Hamilton won Stage 3 of the 2013–14 FIS Tour de Ski, a 1.5 kilometer freestyle sprint. In doing so, he became the first American male skier to win a World Cup race since Bill Koch won the Sarajevo 30 km in February 1983. On December 19, 2015, Hamilton placed second in the World Cup freestyle sprint in Toblach.

He announced his retirement from cross-country skiing in March, 2021.

In 2019, Hamilton married fellow U.S. cross-country teammate Sophie Caldwell.

== Cross-country skiing results ==
All results are sourced from the International Ski Federation (FIS).

=== Olympic Games ===
Year	Age	15 km individual	30 km skiathlon	50 km mass start	Sprint	4 × 10 km relay	Team sprint
2010	22	64	—	—	29	13	—
2014	26	—	—	—	27	11	6
2018	30	—	—	—	20	—	6

=== World Championships ===
Year	Age	15 km individual	30 km skiathlon	50 km mass start	Sprint	4 × 10 km relay	Team sprint
2011	23	51	—	—	25	—	—
2013	25	—	—	—	34	—	—
2015	27	—	—	—	12	11	7
2017	29	—	—	—	28	10	5
2019	31	—	—	34	9	—	8
2021	33	31	—	—	—	8	14

=== World Cup ===
==== Season standings ====
Season	Age	Discipline standings			Ski Tour standings				
Season	Age	Overall	Distance	Sprint	Nordic Opening	Tour de Ski	Ski Tour 2020	World Cup Final	Ski Tour Canada
2010	22	176	—	107	—N/a	—	—N/a	—	—N/a
2011	23	130	NC	79	DNF	—	—N/a	—	—N/a
2012	24	62	NC	22	—	DNF	—N/a	—	—N/a
2013	25	91	NC	46	DNF	—	—N/a	—	—N/a
2014	26	54	NC	20	DNF	DNF	—N/a	—	—N/a
2015	27	63	89	26	DNF	DNF	—N/a	—N/a	—N/a
2016	28	32	NC	10	68	DNF	—N/a	—N/a	DNF
2017	29	30	NC	9	DNF	DNF	—N/a	45	—N/a
2018	30	40	73	17	DNF	DNF	—N/a	49	—N/a
2019	31	37	NC	17	66	DNF	—N/a	26	—N/a
2020	32	61	NC	24	DNF	—	DNF	—N/a	—N/a
2021	33	51	NC	14	55	DNF	—N/a	—N/a	—N/a

==== Individual podiums ====
- 1 victory – (1 SWC)
- 4 podiums – (2 WC, 2 SWC)

No.	Season	Date	Location	Race	Level	Place
1	2013–14	31 December 2013	Lenzerheide, Switzerland	1.5 km Sprint F	Stage World Cup	1st
2	2015–16	19 December 2015	Toblach, Italy	1.3 km Sprint F	World Cup	2nd
3	2015–16	1 March 2016	Gatineau, Canada	1.7 km Sprint F	Stage World Cup	3rd
4	2016–17	14 January 2017	Toblach, Italy	1.3 km Sprint F	World Cup	2nd
