= 2013–14 Tour de Ski =

Cross-country skiing event

Tour de Ski
2013–14 FIS Cross-Country World Cup

Ski tour details
- Venue(s): Oberhof, Germany; Lenzerheide, Switzerland; Cortina d'Ampezzo, Italy; Toblach, Italy; Val di Fiemme, Italy
- Dates: 28 December 2013 – 5 January 2014
- Stages: 7

Results
Men
Jersey awarded to the men's overall winner	Winner	Martin Johnsrud Sundby (NOR)
	Second	Chris Jespersen (NOR)
	Third	Petter Northug (NOR)
Jersey awarded to the men's sprint classification winner	Sprint	Martin Johnsrud Sundby (NOR)
Women
Jersey awarded to the women's overall winner	Winner	Therese Johaug (NOR)
	Second	Astrid Uhrenholdt Jacobsen (NOR)
	Third	Heidi Weng (NOR)
Jersey awarded to the women's sprint classification winner	Sprint	Astrid Uhrenholdt Jacobsen (NOR)

The 2013–14 Tour de Ski was the eighth edition of the Tour de Ski. The Stage World Cup event began in Oberhof, Germany on December 28, 2013, and ended in Val di Fiemme, Italy on January 5, 2014. The cups were defended by Justyna Kowalczyk (Poland) and Alexander Legkov (Russia).

== Controversy ==
The "last minute changes" introduced by the organizers of 2013–14 edition of Tour de Ski resulted in controversies regarding the balance between the free and classical techniques in the competition. Some people, including the four times winner of Tour de Ski and Olympic Champion Justyna Kowalczyk, resigned from participation in protest against changes excessively favoring freestyle competitors.

== Schedule ==
Stage	Venue	Date	Event	Technique	Distance		Start time (CET)	
Stage	Venue	Date	Event	Technique	Women	Men	Women	Men
1	Oberhof (GER)	28 December 2013	Prologue, individual start	Freestyle	3 km	4.5 km	14:00	15:15
2	Oberhof (GER)	29 December 2013	Sprint, qualification and finals	Freestyle	1.4 km	1.4 km	14:30	15:30
3	Lenzerheide (SUI)	31 December 2013	Sprint, qualification and finals	Freestyle	1.4 km	1.4 km	14:45	
4	Lenzerheide (SUI)	1 January 2014	Distance, mass start	Classic	10 km	15 km	15:45	13:00
5	Cortina - Toblach (ITA)	3 January 2014	Distance, pursuit	Freestyle	15 km	35 km	10:30	12:15
6	Val di Fiemme (ITA)	4 January 2014	Distance, individual start	Classic	5 km	10 km	15:45	11:00
7	Val di Fiemme (ITA)	5 January 2014	Final Climb, pursuit	Freestyle	9 km	9 km	13:30	15:00

== Final standings ==
Legend
Denotes the winner of the Overall standings	Denotes the winner of the Sprint standings

=== Overall standings ===
Final Standings, with bonus seconds deducted.

==== Men ====
Final overall standings (1–10)
Rank	Name	Time
1	Martin Johnsrud Sundby (NOR)	3:05:52.2
2	Chris Jespersen (NOR)	+36.0
3	Petter Northug (NOR)	+1:49.5
4	Sjur Røthe (NOR)	+1:55.7
5	Alexander Legkov (RUS)	+2:33.6
6	Tord Asle Gjerdalen (NOR)	+2:45.6
7	Ilia Chernousov (RUS)	+2:56.4
8	Calle Halfvarsson (SWE)	+3:06.5
9	Didrik Tønseth (NOR)	+3:19.1
10	Martin Jakš (CZE)	+3:25.7

Final overall standings (11–48)
Rank	Name	Time
11	Jean-Marc Gaillard (FRA)	+3:33.0
12	Hannes Dotzler (GER)	+3:34.5
13	Ville Nousiainen (FIN)	+3:46.7
14	Lari Lehtonen (FIN)	+3:52.8
15	Ivan Babikov (CAN)	+4:03.2
16	Niklas Dyrhaug (NOR)	+4:09.5
17	Giorgio Di Centa (ITA)	+4:22.4
18	Sami Jauhojärvi (FIN)	+4:30.7
19	Daniel Rickardsson (SWE)	+4:40.9
20	Robin Duvillard (FRA)	+4:48.6
21	Jonas Dobler (GER)	+5:11.9
22	Alexander Utkin (RUS)	+5:30.5
23	Konstantin Glavatskikh (RUS)	+5:36.6
24	Noah Hoffman (USA)	+5:47.9
25	Jens Filbrich (GER)	+5:53.4
26	Andrew Musgrave (GBR)	+6:04.0
27	Sergei Dolidovich (BLR)	+6:13.4
28	Martin Johansson (SWE)	+6:21.2
29	Jens Eriksson (SWE)	+6:27.5
30	Thomas Bing (GER)	+6:33.2
31	Toni Livers (SUI)	+6:44.3
32	Keishin Yoshida (JPN)	+6:51.7
33	Michail Semenov (BLR)	+7:16.2
34	Andrey Larkov (RUS)	+7:27.6
35	Aleš Razým (CZE)	+7:36.5
36	Petr Sedov (RUS)	+7:51.1
37	Ivan Perrillat Boiteux (FRA)	+8:18.1
38	Martin Bajčičák (SVK)	+9:31.9
39	Thomas Moriggl (ITA)	+9:50.4
40	Jonas Baumann (SUI)	+10:42.1
41	Andy Kühne (GER)	+11:10.8
42	Alexander Lasutkin (BLR)	+11:38.9
43	Jiří Magál (CZE)	+12:04.0
44	Karel Tammjärv (EST)	+14:34.8
45	Gustav Eriksson (SWE)	+14:53.8
46	Raido Ränkel (EST)	+15:06.0
47	Carl Quicklund (SWE)	+15:17.3
48	Xu Wenlong (CHN)	+24:30.8

==== Women ====
Final overall standings (1–10)
Rank	Name	Time
1	Therese Johaug (NOR)	2:04:16.4
2	Astrid Uhrenholdt Jacobsen (NOR)	+20.4
3	Heidi Weng (NOR)	+2:50.4
4	Krista Lähteenmäki (FIN)	+2:56.1
5	Kerttu Niskanen (FIN)	+3:18.1
6	Anne Kyllönen (FIN)	+3:50.2
7	Liz Stephen (USA)	+4:02.4
8	Eva Vrabcová-Nývltová (CZE)	+4:05.3
9	Aino-Kaisa Saarinen (FIN)	+4:18.5
10	Masako Ishida (JPN)	+4:44.0

Final overall standings (11–42)
Rank	Name	Time
11	Sara Lindborg (SWE)	+5:03.3
12	Katrin Zeller (GER)	+5:10.5
13	Jessie Diggins (USA)	+5:17.8
14	Valentyna Shevchenko (UKR)	+5:57.8
15	Aurore Jéan (FRA)	+6:02.1
16	Riitta-Liisa Roponen (FIN)	+6:10.2
17	Emma Wikén (SWE)	+6:29.6
18	Maria Rydqvist (SWE)	+6:46.7
19	Claudia Nystad (GER)	+6:59.3
20	Irina Khazova (RUS)	+7:10.1
21	Paulina Maciuszek (POL)	+7:10.3
22	Olga Kuzyukova (RUS)	+7:12.7
23	Anouk Faivre Picon (FRA)	+7:17.8
24	Stefanie Böhler (GER)	+7:20.2
25	Debora Agreiter (ITA)	+7:32.3
26	Coraline Hugue (FRA)	+7:56.5
27	Teresa Stadlober (AUT)	+8:04.0
28	Ilaria Debertolis (ITA)	+8:11.4
29	Barbara Jezeršek (SLO)	+8:19.9
30	Elisa Brocard (ITA)	+8:24.7
31	Polina Medvedeva (RUS)	+8:45.1
32	Célia Aymonier (FRA)	+9:03.4
33	Petra Nováková (CZE)	+9:42.8
34	Larisa Shaidurova (RUS)	+10:54.0
35	Alevtina Tanygina (RUS)	+11:15.7
36	Polina Ermoshina (RUS)	+11:35.4
37	Mariya Guschina (RUS)	+12:07.9
38	Evelina Settlin (SWE)	+12:22.5
39	Li Hongxue (CHN)	+12:23.9
40	Yulia Tikhonova (RUS)	+12:29.9
41	Julia Svan (SWE)	+15:23.2
42	Tatjana Mannima (EST)	+16:19.9

=== Sprint standings ===
Final Sprint standings, all bonus seconds counts.

==== Men ====
Final sprint standings (1–10)
Rank	Name	Time
1	Martin Johnsrud Sundby (NOR)	1:43
2	Petter Northug (NOR)	1:12
3	Alex Harvey (CAN)	1:02
4	Calle Halfvarsson (SWE)	0:59
5	Federico Pellegrino (ITA)	0:50
6	Alexander Legkov (RUS)	0:34
7	Josef Wenzl (GER)	0:34
8	Ilia Chernousov (RUS)	0:33
9	Simeon Hamilton (USA)	0:30
10	Andrew Newell (USA)	0:28

==== Women ====
Final sprint standings (1–10)
Rank	Name	Time
1	Astrid Uhrenholdt Jacobsen (NOR)	1:24
2	Ingvild Flugstad Østberg (NOR)	0:59
3	Therese Johaug (NOR)	0:57
4	Denise Herrmann (GER)	0:51
5	Hanna Erikson (SWE)	0:49
6	Anne Kyllönen (FIN)	0:43
7	Marit Bjørgen (NOR)	0:42
8	Kerttu Niskanen (FIN)	0:38
9	Hanna Kolb (GER)	0:35
10	Laurien van der Graaff (SUI)	0:28

== Stages ==
=== Stage 1 ===
28 December 2013, Oberhof, Germany - prologue

Men – 4.5 km Freestyle (individual)
Place	Name	Time
1	Alex Harvey (CAN)	9:03.8
2	Devon Kershaw (CAN)	+4.1
3	Chris Jespersen (NOR)	+10.2
4	Ilia Chernousov (RUS)	+13.4
5	Robin Duvillard (FRA)	+13.8
6	Martin Johnsrud Sundby (NOR)	+14.4
7	Jens Eriksson (SWE)	+15.5
8	Sami Jauhojärvi (FIN)	+15.7
9	Finn Hågen Krogh (NOR)	+16.6
10	Aivar Rehemaa (EST)	+16.8

Women – 3.0 km Freestyle (individual)
Place	Name	Time
1	Marit Bjørgen (NOR)	6:34.4
2	Astrid Uhrenholdt Jacobsen (NOR)	+1.9
3	Sylwia Jaśkowiec (POL)	+7.0
4	Denise Herrmann (GER)	+8.4
5	Jessie Diggins (USA)	+9.2
6	Anne Kyllönen (FIN)	+24.5
7	Aino-Kaisa Saarinen (FIN)	+24.7
8	Alenka Čebašek (SLO)	+25.7
9	Sophie Caldwell (USA)	+26.8
10	Kerttu Niskanen (FIN)	+27.0

=== Stage 2 ===
29 December 2013, Oberhof, Germany

Men – 1.5 km Sprint Freestyle
Place	Name	Time
1	Calle Halfvarsson (SWE)	3:08.61
2	Federico Pellegrino (ITA)	+0.30
3	Martin Johnsrud Sundby (NOR)	+1.80
4	Jens Eriksson (SWE)	+5.50
5	Josef Wenzl (GER)	+8.63
6	Petter Northug (NOR)	+32.30

Women – 1.5 km Sprint Freestyle
Place	Name	Time
1	Hanna Erikson (SWE)	3:25.69
2	Denise Herrmann (GER)	+0.79
3	Ingvild Flugstad Østberg (NOR)	+4.32
4	Nicole Fessel (GER)	+4.40
5	Marit Bjørgen (NOR)	+4.80
6	Lucia Anger (GER)	+9.34

=== Stage 3 ===
31 December 2013, Lenzerheide, Switzerland

Men – 1.4 km Sprint Freestyle
Place	Name	Time
1	Simeon Hamilton (USA)	2:37.04
2	Alex Harvey (CAN)	+0.32
3	Martin Johnsrud Sundby (NOR)	+0.74
4	Federico Pellegrino (ITA)	+0.94
5	Finn Hågen Krogh (NOR)	+1.61
6	Calle Halfvarsson (SWE)	+2.96

Women – 1.4 km Sprint Freestyle
Place	Name	Time
1	Ingvild Flugstad Østberg (NOR)	2:58.00
2	Astrid Uhrenholdt Jacobsen (NOR)	+0.14
3	Denise Herrmann (GER)	+0.82
4	Laurien van der Graaff (SUI)	+2.60
5	Hanna Kolb (GER)	+4.14

=== Stage 4 ===
1 January 2014, Lenzerheide, Switzerland

Men – 15 km Classic (mass start)
Place	Name	Time
1	Alexey Poltoranin (KAZ)	34:28.1
2	Hannes Dotzler (GER)	+0.8
3	Stanislav Volzhentsev (RUS)	+1.0
4	Thomas Bing (GER)	+1.1
5	Daniel Rickardsson (SWE)	+4.0
6	Sami Jauhojärvi (FIN)	+4.0
7	Jens Filbrich (GER)	+6.9
8	Sergey Turyshev (RUS)	+7.9
9	Sjur Røthe (NOR)	+7.9
10	Ilia Chernousov (RUS)	+8.9

Women – 10 km Classic (mass start)
Place	Name	Time
1	Kerttu Niskanen (FIN)	26:27.4
2	Astrid Uhrenholdt Jacobsen (NOR)	+0.4
3	Therese Johaug (NOR)	+1.1
4	Heidi Weng (NOR)	+1.9
5	Aino-Kaisa Saarinen (FIN)	+2.5
6	Anne Kyllönen (FIN)	+23.9
7	Eva Vrabcová-Nývltová (CZE)	+24.5
8	Olga Sementina (RUS)	+25.1
9	Hanna Erikson (FIN)	+25.8
10	Aurore Jéan (FRA)	+29.8

=== Stage 5 ===
3 January 2014, Cortina d'Ampezzo-Toblach, Italy

Men – 35 km Freestyle (pursuit)
Place	Name	Time
1	Martin Johnsrud Sundby (NOR)	1:20:18.7
2	Petter Northug (NOR)	+58.2
3	Alex Harvey (CAN)	+58.7
4	Calle Halfvarsson (SWE)	+59.0
5	Alexander Legkov (RUS)	+59.7
6	Chris Jespersen (NOR)	+1:00.5
7	Ilia Chernousov (RUS)	+1:03.5
8	Ville Nousiainen (FIN)	+1:55.4
9	Tord Asle Gjerdalen (NOR)	+1:55.6
10	Sjur Røthe (NOR)	+1:55.8

Women – 15 km Freestyle (pursuit)
Place	Name	Time
1	Astrid Uhrenholdt Jacobsen (NOR)	37:30.3
2	Therese Johaug (NOR)	+38.7
3	Anne Kyllönen (FIN)	+1:12.2
4	Kerttu Niskanen (FIN)	+1:22.5
5	Krista Lähteenmäki (FIN)	+1:31.7
6	Eva Vrabcová-Nývltová (CZE)	+1:31.7
7	Aurore Jéan (FRA)	+1:32.0
8	Heidi Weng (NOR)	+1:32.3
9	Aino-Kaisa Saarinen (FIN)	+2:19.2
10	Sara Lindborg (SWE)	+2:20.6

=== Stage 6 ===
4 January 2014, Val di Fiemme, Italy

Men – 10 km Classic (individual)
Place	Name	Time
1	Petter Northug (NOR)	24:45.6
2	Martin Johnsrud Sundby (NOR)	+9.7
3	Chris Jespersen (NOR)	+16.0
4	Sjur Røthe (NOR)	+29.0
5	Alex Harvey (CAN)	+35.5
6	Hannes Dotzler (GER)	+38.0
7	Didrik Tønseth (NOR)	+44.3
8	Matti Heikkinen (FIN)	+49.6
9	Ilia Chernousov (RUS)	+50.2
10	Calle Halfvarsson (SWE)	+50.4

Women – 5 km Classic (individual)
Place	Name	Time
1	Therese Johaug (NOR)	13:58.4
2	Astrid Uhrenholdt Jacobsen (NOR)	+14.9
3	Anne Kyllönen (FIN)	+19.2
4	Kerttu Niskanen (FIN)	+19.7
5	Krista Lähteenmäki (FIN)	+21.4
6	Heidi Weng (NOR)	+22.9
7	Aino-Kaisa Saarinen (FIN)	+23.3
8	Masako Ishida (JPN)	+25.8
9	Sara Lindborg (SWE)	+30.0
10	Jessie Diggins (USA)	+30.3

=== Stage 7 ===
5 January 2014, Val di Fiemme, Italy

The race for Fastest of the Day counts for 2013–14 FIS Cross-Country World Cup points.

Men – 9 km Final Climb Freestyle (pursuit)
Place	Name	Time
1	Chris Jespersen (NOR)	31:58.8
2	Sjur Røthe (NOR)	+6.4
3	Ivan Babikov (CAN)	+15.3
4	Robin Duvillard (FRA)	+15.9
5	Niklas Dyrhaug (NOR)	+19.7
6	Giorgio Di Centa (ITA)	+22.9
7	Tord Asle Gjerdalen (NOR)	+27.6
8	Andrew Musgrave (GBR)	+28.1
9	Sami Jauhojärvi (FIN)	+33.7
10	Jean-Marc Gaillard (FRA)	+36.5

Women – 9 km Final Climb Freestyle (pursuit)
Place	Name	Time
1	Therese Johaug (NOR)	34:19.8
2	Astrid Uhrenholdt Jacobsen (NOR)	+44.2
3	Elizabeth Stephen (USA)	+58.7
4	Heidi Weng (NOR)	+1:08.9
5	Masako Ishida (JPN)	+1:14.9
6	Krista Lähteenmäki (FIN)	+1:16.7
7	Katrin Zeller (GER)	+1:45.8
8	Kerttu Niskanen (FIN)	+1:49.6
9	Aino-Kaisa Saarinen (FIN)	+1:49.7
10	Maria Rydqvist (SWE)	+1:50.4
