= Anders Gløersen =

Norwegian cross-country skier

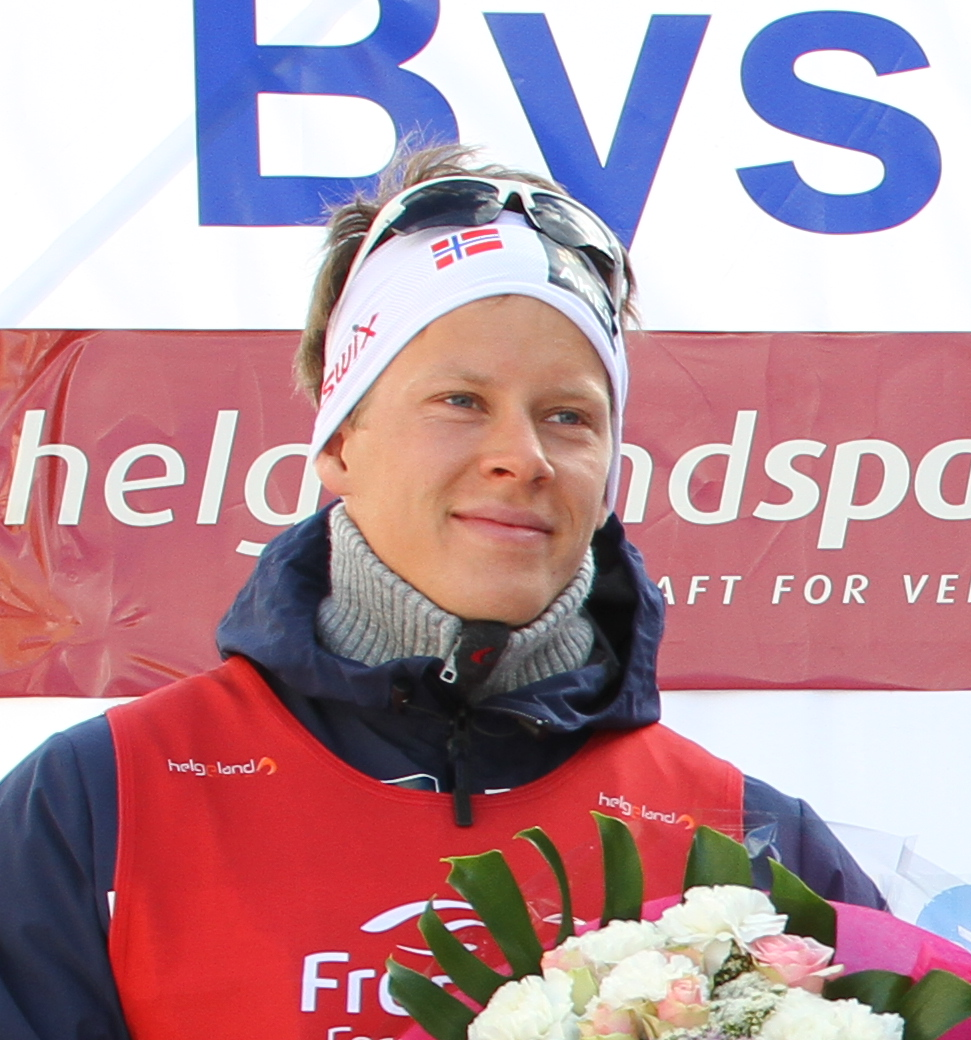

Personal information
- Nationality: Norway
- Born: 22 May 1986 (age 40) Oslo, Norway
- Height: 185 cm (6 ft 1 in)

Sport
- Sport: Skiing
- Club: Rustad IL

World Cup career
- Seasons: 12 – (2007–2018)
- Indiv. starts: 92
- Indiv. podiums: 15
- Indiv. wins: 5
- Team starts: 13
- Team podiums: 7
- Team wins: 3
- Overall titles: 0 – (21st in 2008)
- Discipline titles: 0
Medal record
Men's cross-country skiing
Representing Norway
World Championships
Gold medal – first place	2015 Falun	4 × 10 km relay
Bronze medal – third place	2015 Falun	15 km freestyle

Anders Gloeersen (Norwegian: Anders Gløersen, born 22 May 1986) is a Norwegian cross-country skier who has competed since 2005. He has five World Cup victories, earning four of them in the individual sprint events (2007, 2008, 2010, 2013), and one in a 15 km freestyle race in Davos (2014). He won a bronze medal in the 15 km freestyle race in Falun the next year, and replaced Sundby in the third leg of the relay. His effort in the relay helped secure another win, Norway's eighth relay victory in a row.

== Cross-country skiing results ==
All results are sourced from the International Ski Federation (FIS).

=== Olympic Games ===
Year	Age	15 km individual	30 km skiathlon	50 km mass start	Sprint	4 × 10 km relay	Team sprint
2014	27	—	—	—	4	—	—

=== World Championships ===
- 2 medals – (1 gold, 1 bronze)

Year	Age	15 km individual	30 km skiathlon	50 km mass start	Sprint	4 × 10 km relay	Team sprint
2011	24	—	—	—	13	—	—
2015	28	Bronze	—	—	—	Gold	—
2017	30	—	—	11	—	—	—

=== World Cup ===
==== Season standings ====
Season	Age	Discipline standings			Ski Tour standings			
Season	Age	Overall	Distance	Sprint	Nordic Opening	Tour de Ski	World Cup Final	Ski Tour Canada
2007	20	NC	—	NC	—N/a	—	—N/a	—N/a
2008	21	21	NC	4	—N/a	—	—	—N/a
2009	22	100	—	55	—N/a	—	—	—N/a
2010	23	28	115	9	—N/a	—	28	—N/a
2011	24	60	—	21	—	—	—	—N/a
2012	25	35	62	11	—	—	36	—N/a
2013	26	42	56	12	—	—	33	—N/a
2014	27	32	47	17	—	—	16	—N/a
2015	28	25	23	16	40	—	—N/a	—N/a
2016	29	28	25	38	17	DNF	—N/a	DNF
2017	30	45	27	—	—	—	—	—N/a
2018	31	NC	NC	—	—	—	—	—N/a

==== Individual podiums ====
- 5 victories – (5 WC)
- 15 podiums – (13 WC, 2 SWC)

No.	Season	Date	Location	Race	Level	Place
1	2007–08	16 December 2007	Rybinsk, Russia	1.2 km Sprint F	World Cup	1st
2	2007–08	1 March 2008	Lahti, Finland	1.4 km Sprint F	World Cup	1st
3	2009–10	5 December 2009	Düsseldorf, Germany	1.5 km Sprint F	World Cup	2nd
4	2009–10	14 March 2010	Oslo, Norway	1.5 km Sprint F	World Cup	1st
5	2010–11	5 February 2011	Rybinsk, Russia	1.3 km Sprint F	World Cup	3rd
6	2011–12	18 December 2011	Rogla, Slovenia	1.2 km Sprint F	World Cup	3rd
7	2011–12	2 February 2012	Moscow, Russia	1.5 km Sprint F	World Cup	2nd
8	2012–13	15 December 2012	Canmore, Canada	1.3 km Sprint F	World Cup	2nd
9	2012–13	22 March 2013	Falun, Sweden	3.75 km Individual F	Stage World Cup	3rd
10	2013–14	15 December 2013	Davos, Switzerland	1.5 km Sprint F	World Cup	1st
11	2013–14	16 March 2014	Falun, Sweden	15 km Pursuit F	Stage World Cup	3rd
12	2014–15	14 December 2014	Davos, Switzerland	1.3 km Sprint F	World Cup	2nd
13	2014–15	20 December 2014	Davos, Switzerland	15 km Individual F	World Cup	1st
14	2015–16	12 December 2015	Davos, Switzerland	30 km Individual F	World Cup	3rd
15	2016–17	10 December 2016	Davos, Switzerland	30 km Individual F	World Cup	2nd

==== Team podiums ====
- 3 victories – (2 RL, 1 TS)
- 7 podiums – (3 RL, 4 TS)

No.	Season	Date	Location	Race	Level	Place	Teammate(s)
1	2009–10	6 December 2009	Düsseldorf, Germany	6 × 1.5 km Team Sprint F	World Cup	2nd	Brandsdal
2	2010–11	5 December 2010	Düsseldorf, Germany	6 × 1.6 km Team Sprint F	World Cup	1st	Hattestad
3	2012–13	7 December 2012	Quebec City, Canada	6 × 1.6 km Team Sprint F	World Cup	3rd	Brandsdal
4	2014–15	18 January 2015	Otepää, Estonia	6 × 1.5 km Team Sprint F	World Cup	2nd	Krogh
5	2015–16	6 December 2015	Lillehammer, Norway	4 × 7.5 km Relay C/F	World Cup	3rd	Iversen / Tønseth / Røthe
6	2016–17	18 December 2016	La Clusaz, France	4 × 7.5 km Relay C/F	World Cup	1st	Tønseth / Sundby / Krogh
7	2016–17	22 January 2017	Ulricehamn, Sweden	4 × 7.5 km Relay C/F	World Cup	1st	Krüger / Sundby / Krogh
