= Josef Wenzl =

German cross-country skier (born 1984)

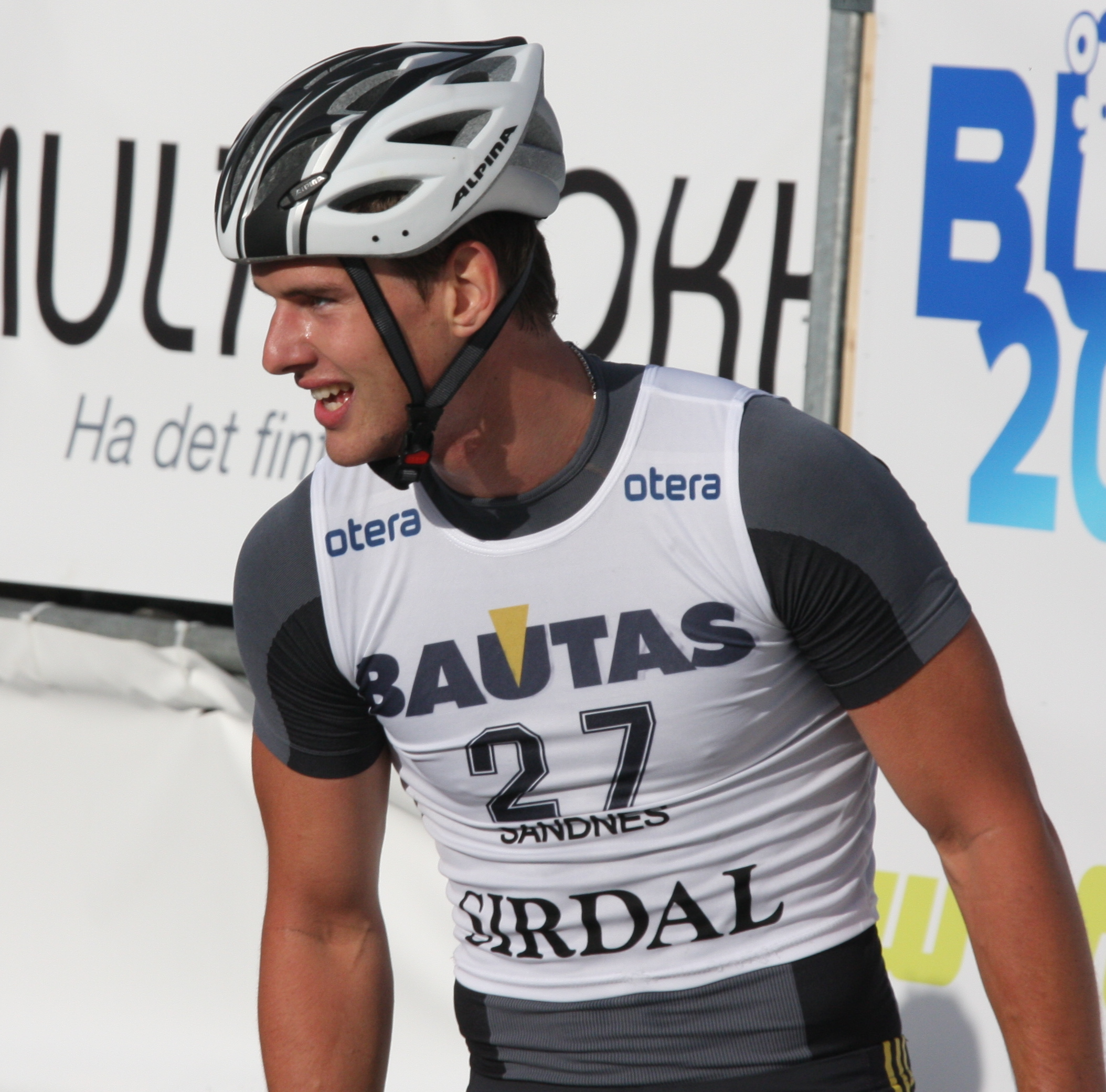
- Wenzl in 2009

Personal information
- Nationality: Germany
- Born: 20 December 1984 (age 41) Zwiesel, West Germany

Sport
- Sport: Skiing
- Club: SC Zwiesel

World Cup career
- Seasons: 13 – (2005–2017)
- Indiv. starts: 94
- Indiv. podiums: 5
- Indiv. wins: 1
- Team starts: 17
- Team podiums: 1
- Team wins: 0
- Overall titles: 0 – (18th in 2014)
- Discipline titles: 0
Medal record
Men's cross-country skiing
Representing Germany
U23 World Championships
| Silver medal – second place | 2006 Kranj | Individual sprint |

Josef Wenzl (born 20 December 1984) is a German cross-country skier who has competed since 2002. He finished 31st in the individual sprint at the 2010 Winter Olympics in Vancouver, British Columbia, Canada.

Wenzl's best finish at the FIS Nordic World Ski Championships was 14th in the sprint event at Sapporo in 2007.

His only World Cup victory was in a sprint event at Düsseldorf in October 2007.

== Cross-country skiing results ==
All results are sourced from the International Ski Federation (FIS).

=== Olympic Games ===
| Year | Age | 15 km individual | 30 km skiathlon | 50 km mass start | Sprint | 4 × 10 km relay | Team sprint |
|---|---|---|---|---|---|---|---|
| 2010 | 25 | — | — | — | 31 | — | — |
| 2014 | 29 | — | — | — | 31 | — | — |

=== World Championships ===
| Year | Age | 15 km individual | 30 km skiathlon | 50 km mass start | Sprint | 4 × 10 km relay | Team sprint |
|---|---|---|---|---|---|---|---|
| 2007 | 22 | — | — | — | 14 | — | — |
| 2009 | 24 | — | — | — | 26 | — | — |
| 2011 | 26 | — | — | — | 39 | — | — |

=== World Cup ===
==== Season standings ====
| Season | Age | Discipline standings | | | Ski Tour standings | | | |
| Season | Age | Overall | Distance | Sprint | Nordic Opening | Tour de Ski | World Cup Final | Ski Tour Canada |
|---|---|---|---|---|---|---|---|---|
| 2005 | 21 | NC | — | NC | —N/a | —N/a | —N/a | —N/a |
| 2006 | 22 | 104 | — | 45 | —N/a | —N/a | —N/a | —N/a |
| 2007 | 23 | 50 | — | 24 | —N/a | — | —N/a | —N/a |
| 2008 | 24 | 43 | NC | 16 | —N/a | — | 60 | —N/a |
| 2009 | 25 | 57 | NC | 21 | —N/a | — | — | —N/a |
| 2010 | 26 | 94 | — | 45 | —N/a | — | — | —N/a |
| 2011 | 27 | 71 | — | 33 | — | — | — | —N/a |
| 2012 | 28 | 46 | 97 | 15 | — | DNF | 43 | —N/a |
| 2013 | 29 | 124 | NC | 73 | DNF | — | — | —N/a |
| 2014 | 30 | 18 | NC | 3 | — | DNF | DNF | —N/a |
| 2015 | 31 | 157 | DNF | 97 | DNF | DNF | —N/a | —N/a |
| 2016 | 32 | NC | — | NC | — | — | —N/a | — |
| 2017 | 33 | NC | — | NC | — | — | — | —N/a |

=== Individual podiums ===
- 1 victory
- 5 podiums

| No. | Season | Date | Location | Race | Level | Place |
|---|---|---|---|---|---|---|
| 1 | 2007–08 | 27 October 2007 | Düsseldorf, Germany | 1.5 km Sprint F | World Cup | 1st |
| 2 | 2008–09 | 16 January 2009 | Whistler, Canada | 1.6 km Sprint C | World Cup | 3rd |
| 3 | 2011–12 | 14 January 2012 | Milan, Italy | 1.4 km Sprint F | World Cup | 2nd |
| 4 | 2013–14 | 18 January 2014 | Szklarska Poręba, Poland | 1.5 km Sprint F | World Cup | 2nd |
| 5 | 2013–14 | 2 February 2014 | Toblach, Italy | 1.3 km Sprint F | World Cup | 3rd |

=== Team podiums ===
- 1 podium – (1 TS)

| No. | Season | Date | Location | Race | Level | Place | Teammate |
|---|---|---|---|---|---|---|---|
| 1 | 2009–10 | 24 January 2010 | Rybinsk, Russia | 6 × 1.3 km Team Sprint F | World Cup | 3rd | Tscharnke |
