= Hanna Erikson =

Swedish cross-country skier

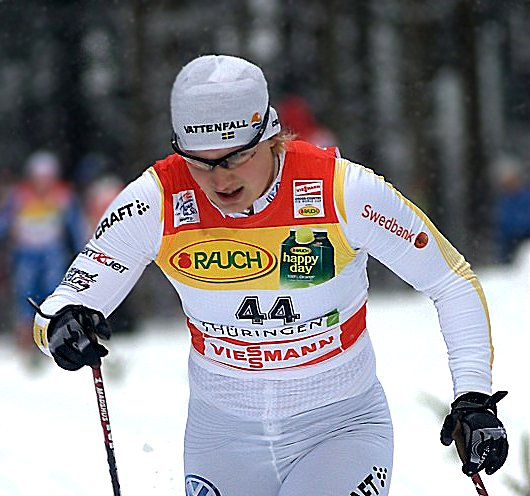
- Hanna Erikson during a January 2010 Tour de Ski competition in Thuringia, Germany

Personal information
- Full name: Valborg Hanna Linnea Erikson
- Nationality: Sweden
- Born: 2 June 1990 (age 36) Örebro, Sweden
- Height: 165 cm (5 ft 5 in)

Sport
- Sport: Skiing
- Club: Åsarna IK

World Cup career
- Seasons: 5 – (2009–2012, 2014)
- Indiv. starts: 66
- Indiv. podiums: 3
- Indiv. wins: 1
- Team starts: 8
- Team podiums: 1
- Team wins: 1
- Overall titles: 0 – (28th in 2012)
- Discipline titles: 0
Medal record
Women's cross-country skiing
Representing Sweden
Junior World Championships
| Gold medal – first place | 2010 Hinterzarten | Individual sprint |
| Silver medal – second place | 2008 Mals | 4 × 3.33 km relay |
| Silver medal – second place | 2009 Praz de Lys-Sommand | Individual sprint |
| Silver medal – second place | 2009 Praz de Lys-Sommand | 4 × 3.33 km relay |
| Bronze medal – third place | 2009 Praz de Lys-Sommand | 10 km pursuit |
| Bronze medal – third place | 2010 Hinterzarten | 5 km classical |
| Bronze medal – third place | 2010 Hinterzarten | 4 × 3.33 km relay |

Hanna Erikson (born June 2, 1990) is a Swedish cross-country skier. She won three medals in the 2009 Junior World Championships.

Erikson, then competing as Hanna Brodin, was second in a World Cup sprint in Otepää in January 2011, only beaten by Slovenian Petra Majdič.

In December 2013, Hanna Erikson won the second stage of the 2013-14 Tour de Ski, a freestyle sprint in Oberhof. Later during that season, she qualified for the Swedish team at the Winter Olympics in Sochi.

== Cross-country skiing results ==
All results are sourced from the International Ski Federation (FIS).

=== Olympic Games ===
| Year | Age | 10 km individual | 15 km skiathlon | 30 km mass start | Sprint | 4 × 5 km relay | Team sprint |
|---|---|---|---|---|---|---|---|
| 2014 | 23 | — | — | — | 51 | — | — |

=== World Championships ===
| Year | Age | 10 km individual | 15 km skiathlon | 30 km mass start | Sprint | 4 × 5 km relay | Team sprint |
|---|---|---|---|---|---|---|---|
| 2009 | 18 | 38 | 50 | 48 | — | — | — |
| 2011 | 20 | — | — | — | 10 | — | — |

=== World Cup ===
==== Season standings ====
| Season | Age | Discipline standings | | | Ski Tour standings | | |
| Season | Age | Overall | Distance | Sprint | Nordic Opening | Tour de Ski | World Cup Final |
|---|---|---|---|---|---|---|---|
| 2009 | 19 | NC | NC | NC | —N/a | — | 54 |
| 2010 | 20 | 56 | 51 | 38 | —N/a | DNF | 31 |
| 2011 | 21 | 39 | NC | 15 | — | — | DNF |
| 2012 | 22 | 28 | 43 | 12 | 47 | DNF | 33 |
| 2014 | 24 | 29 | 40 | 18 | 43 | DNF | 16 |

==== Individual podiums ====
- 1 victory – (1 SWC)
- 3 podiums – (1 WC, 2 SWC)

| No. | Season | Date | Location | Race | Level | Place |
|---|---|---|---|---|---|---|
| 1 | 2010–11 | 23 January 2011 | Otepää, Estonia | 1.2 km Sprint C | World Cup | 2nd |
| 2 | 2011–12 | 29 December 2011 | Oberhof, Germany | 2.5 km Individual F | Stage World Cup | 3rd |
| 3 | 2013–14 | 29 December 2013 | Oberhof, Germany | 1.5 km Sprint F | Stage World Cup | 1st |

==== Team podiums ====
- 1 victory – (1 TS)
- 1 podium – (1 TS)

| No. | Season | Date | Location | Race | Level | Place | Teammate |
|---|---|---|---|---|---|---|---|
| 1 | 2011–12 | 15 January 2012 | Milan, Italy | 6 × 1.4 km Team Sprint F | World Cup | 1st | Ingemarsdotter |
