= Eirik Brandsdal =

Norwegian cross-country skier

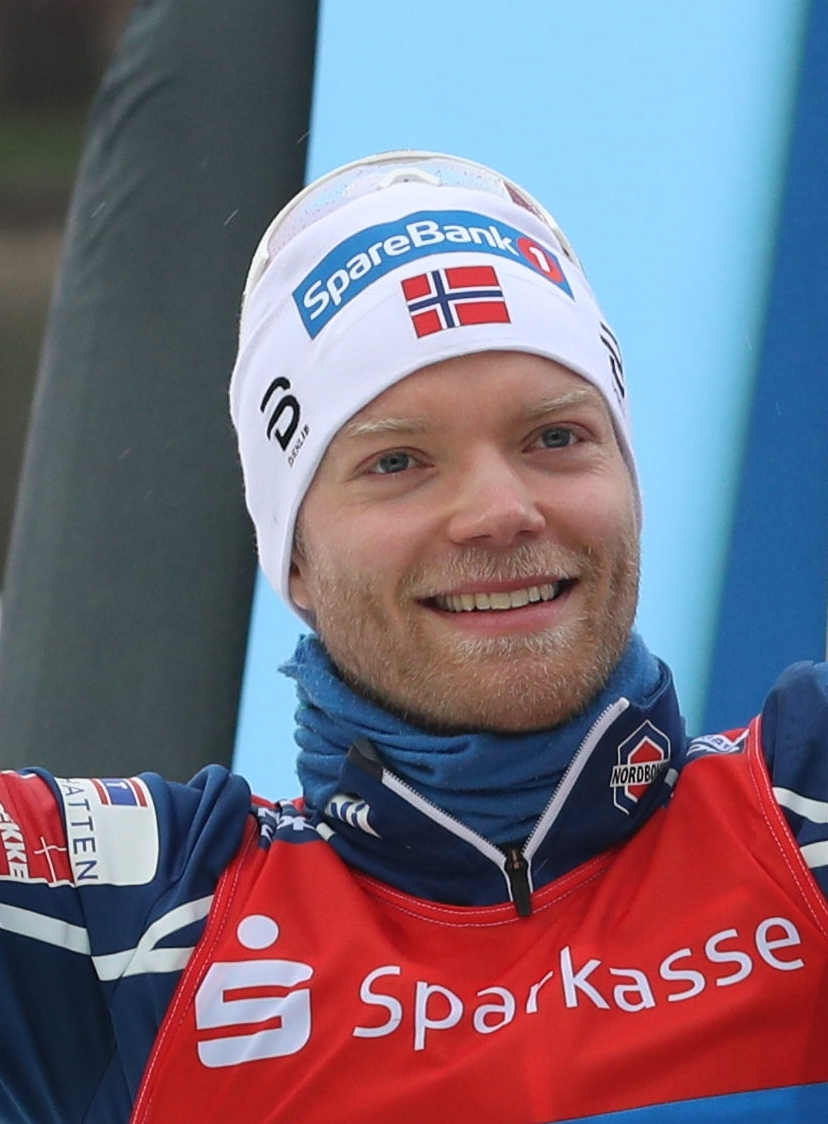
- Eirik Brandsdal in Dresden, 2019

Personal information
- Nationality: Norway
- Born: 11 November 1986 (age 39) Oslo, Norway
- Height: 181 cm (5 ft 11 in)

Sport
- Sport: Skiing
- Club: Kjelsås IL

World Cup career
- Seasons: 14 – (2007–2020)
- Indiv. starts: 128
- Indiv. podiums: 24
- Indiv. wins: 9
- Team starts: 12
- Team podiums: 8
- Team wins: 0
- Overall titles: 0 – (11th in 2015)
- Discipline titles: 0

Eirik Brandsdal (born 11 November 1986) is a Norwegian former cross-country skier who began competing in 2005. His five World Cup victories came in sprint events in Otepää on 23 January 2011, in Milan on 14 January 2012, in Drammen on 7 March 2012, in Kuusamo on 29 November 2014 and in Drammen on 8 March 2017. He retired after the 2019–20 season, which he announced on 24 March 2020.

== Cross-country skiing results ==
All results are sourced from the International Ski Federation (FIS).

=== Olympic Games ===
Year	Age	15 km individual	30 km skiathlon	50 km mass start	Sprint	4 × 10 km relay	Team sprint
2014	27	—	—	—	9	—	—
2018	31	—	—	—	22	—	—

=== World Championships ===
Year	Age	15 km individual	30 km skiathlon	50 km mass start	Sprint	4 × 10 km relay	Team sprint
2011	24	—	65	—	17	—	—
2013	26	—	—	—	6	—	—
2015	28	—	—	—	11	—	—

=== World Cup ===
==== Season standings ====
Season	Age	Discipline standings			Ski Tour standings			
Season	Age	Overall	Distance	Sprint	Nordic Opening	Tour de Ski	World Cup Final	Ski Tour Canada
2007	20	163	—	84	—N/a	—	—N/a	—N/a
2008	21	100	—	64	—N/a	—	—	—N/a
2009	22	65	—	29	—N/a	—	—	—N/a
2010	23	35	105	11	—N/a	—	34	—N/a
2011	24	29	95	6	—	—	36	—N/a
2012	25	17	NC	3rd place, bronze medalist(s)	DNF	—	35	—N/a
2013	26	32	64	7	DNF	—	37	—N/a
2014	27	16	90	2nd place, silver medalist(s)	62	—	30	—N/a
2015	28	11	NC	2nd place, silver medalist(s)	49	—	—N/a	—N/a
2016	29	22	52	5	30	—	—N/a	38
2017	30	31	NC	10	50	—	—	—N/a
2018	31	36	NC	9	DNF	—	57	—N/a
2019	32	16	78	3rd place, bronze medalist(s)	39	DNF	21	—N/a
2020	33	55	NC	20	—	—	—N/a	—N/a

==== Individual podiums ====
- 9 victories – (7 WC, 2 SWC)
- 24 podiums – (19 WC, 5 SWC)

No.	Season	Date	Location	Race	Level	Place
1	2009–10	5 December 2009	Düsseldorf, Germany	1.5 km Sprint F	World Cup	3rd
2	2010–11	23 January 2011	Otepää, Estonia	1.4 km Sprint C	World Cup	1st
3	2010–11	13 March 2011	Lahti, Finland	1.4 km Sprint C	World Cup	2nd
4	2011–12	14 January 2012	Milan, Italy	1.4 km Sprint F	World Cup	1st
5	2011–12	21 January 2012	Otepää, Estonia	1.4 km Sprint C	World Cup	3rd
6	2011–12	7 March 2012	Drammen, Norway	1.2 km Sprint C	World Cup	1st
7	2011–12	14 March 2012	Stockholm, Sweden	1.0 km Sprint C	Stage World Cup	1st
8	2012–13	30 November 2012	Rukatunturi, Finland	1.4 km Sprint C	World Cup	3rd
9	2012–13	20 March 2013	Stockholm, Sweden	1.1 km Sprint C	Stage World Cup	2nd
10	2013–14	29 November 2013	Rukatunturi, Finland	1.4 km Sprint C	Stage World Cup	1st
11	2013–14	2 February 2014	Toblach, Italy	1.3 km Sprint F	World Cup	2nd
12	2013–14	1 March 2014	Lahti, Finland	1.55 km Sprint F	World Cup	3rd
13	2014–15	29 November 2014	Rukatunturi, Finland	1.4 km Sprint C	World Cup	1st
14	2014–15	14 December 2014	Davos, Switzerland	1.3 km Sprint F	World Cup	3rd
15	2014–15	7 March 2015	Lahti, Finland	1.5 km Sprint F	World Cup	1st
16	2014–15	11 March 2015	Drammen, Norway	1.3 km Sprint C	World Cup	1st
17	2015–16	27 November 2015	Rukatunturi, Finland	1.4 km Sprint C	Stage World Cup	2nd
18	2015–16	3 February 2016	Drammen, Norway	1.2 km Sprint C	World Cup	3rd
19	2015–16	8 March 2016	Canmore, Canada	1.5 km Sprint C	Stage World Cup	2nd
20	2016–17	8 March 2017	Drammen, Norway	1.2 km Sprint C	World Cup	1st
21	2017–18	7 March 2018	Drammen, Norway	1.2 km Sprint C	World Cup	2nd
22	2018–19	24 November 2018	Rukatunturi, Finland	1.4 km Sprint C	World Cup	3rd
23	2018–19	12 March 2019	Drammen, Norway	1.2 km Sprint C	World Cup	2nd
24	2019–20	4 March 2020	Konnerud, Norway	1.5 km Sprint F	World Cup	3rd

==== Team podiums ====
- 8 podiums – (8 TS)

No.	Season	Date	Location	Race	Level	Place	Teammate
1	2009–10	6 December 2009	Düsseldorf, Germany	6 × 1.5 km Team Sprint F	World Cup	2nd	Gløersen
2	2010–11	16 January 2011	Liberec, Czech Republic	6 × 1.6 km Team Sprint C	World Cup	3rd	Dahl
3	2012–13	7 December 2012	Quebec City, Canada	6 × 1.6 km Team Sprint F	World Cup	3rd	Gløersen
4	2012–13	13 January 2013	Liberec, Czech Republic	6 × 1.6 km Team Sprint F	World Cup	2nd	Golberg
5	2013–14	22 December 2013	Asiago, Italy	6 × 1.65 km Team Sprint C	World Cup	3rd	Pettersen
6	2013–14	12 January 2014	Nové Město, Czech Republic	6 × 1.6 km Team Sprint C	World Cup	2nd	Rønning
7	2018–19	13 January 2019	Dresden, Germany	6 × 1.6 km Team Sprint F	World Cup	2nd	Golberg
8	2018–19	10 February 2019	Lahti, Finland	6 × 1.6 km Team Sprint C	World Cup	2nd	Skar
