= Martin Johnsrud Sundby =

Norwegian cross-country skier

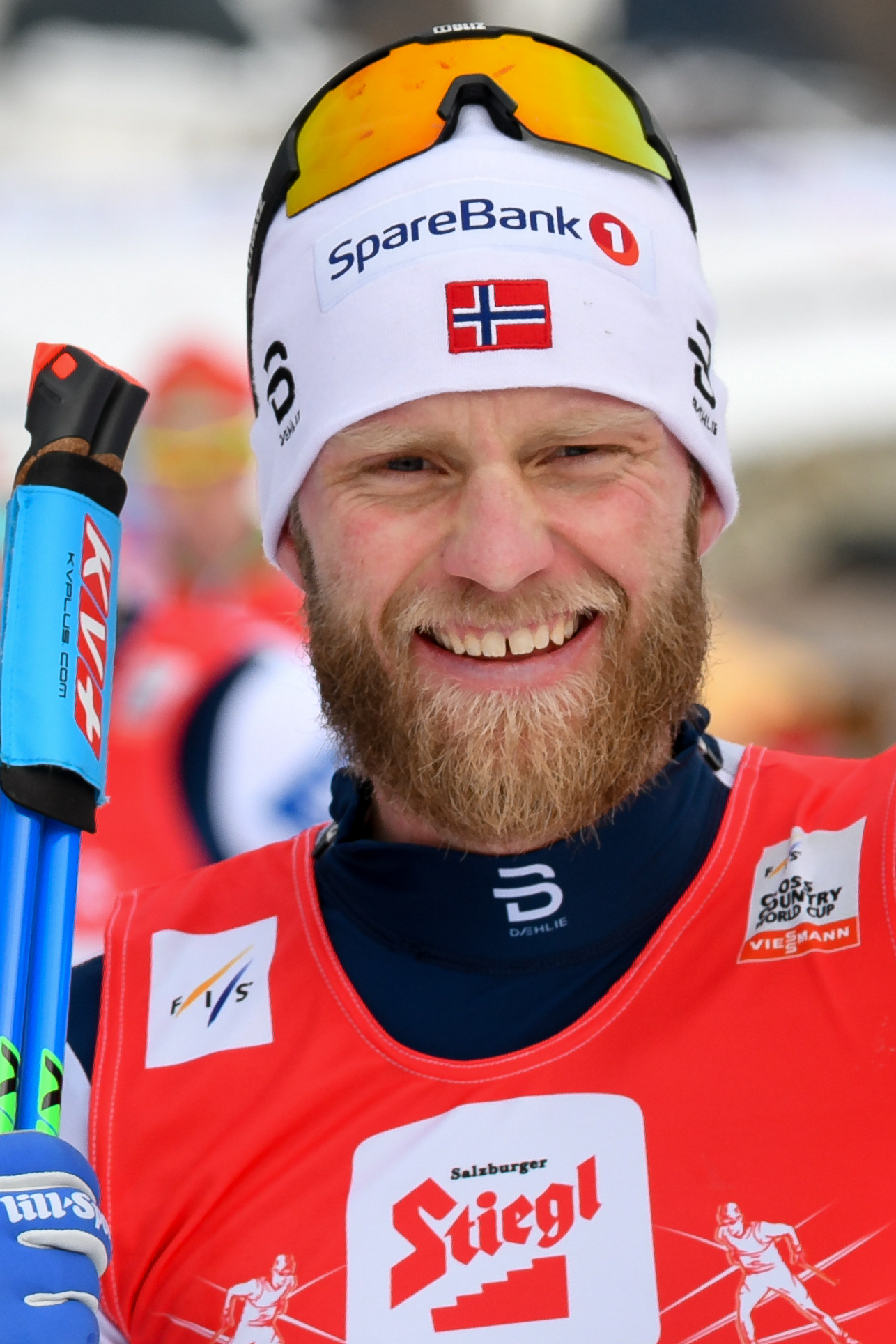
- Martin Johnsrud Sundby during World Cup competitions in Seefeld in Tirol, Austria in January 2018

Personal information
- Nationality: Norway
- Born: 26 September 1984 (age 41) Oslo, Norway
- Height: 1.74 m (5 ft 9 in)

Sport
- Sport: Skiing
- Club: Røa IL

World Cup career
- Seasons: 17 – (2005–2021)
- Indiv. starts: 221
- Indiv. podiums: 74
- Indiv. wins: 30
- Team starts: 20
- Team podiums: 18
- Team wins: 14
- Overall titles: 3 – (2014, 2016, 2017)
- Discipline titles: 3 – (3 DI)
Medal record
Men's cross-country skiing
Representing Norway
International nordic ski competitions
| Event | 1st | 2nd | 3rd |
|---|---|---|---|
| Olympic Games | 2 | 2 | 1 |
| World Championships | 4 | 3 | 2 |
| Total | 6 | 5 | 3 |
Olympic Games
| Gold medal – first place | 2018 Pyeongchang | 4 × 10 km relay |
| Gold medal – first place | 2018 Pyeongchang | Team sprint |
| Silver medal – second place | 2010 Vancouver | 4 × 10 km relay |
| Silver medal – second place | 2018 Pyeongchang | 30 km skiathlon |
| Bronze medal – third place | 2014 Sochi | 30 km skiathlon |
World Championships
| Gold medal – first place | 2011 Oslo | 4 × 10 km relay |
| Gold medal – first place | 2017 Lahti | 4 × 10 km relay |
| Gold medal – first place | 2019 Seefeld | 15 km classical |
| Gold medal – first place | 2019 Seefeld | 4 × 10 km relay |
| Silver medal – second place | 2013 Val di Flemme | 30 km skiathlon |
| Silver medal – second place | 2017 Lahti | 15 km classical |
| Silver medal – second place | 2017 Lahti | 30 km skiathlon |
| Bronze medal – third place | 2011 Oslo | 15 km classical |
| Bronze medal – third place | 2019 Seefeld | 30 km skiathlon |
Junior World Championships
| Silver medal – second place | 2003 Sollefteå | 4 × 10 km relay |
- Updated on 16 November 2021

Martin Johnsrud Sundby (born 26 September 1984) is a former Norwegian cross-country skier who competed between 2003 and 2021. He is a two time Olympic champion at the 2018 Winter Olympics in the team sprint and relay and was also a silver and bronze medalist in the 30 km skiathlon in 2014 and 2018. Sundby is a 4-time world champion, winning his sole individual gold medal at the 15 km at the 2019 Nordic World Ski Championships in Seefeld. In 2014, he became the first Norwegian to win the Tour de Ski, a feat he repeated in 2016. He also won the overall world cup in 2014, 2016 and 2017.

== Career ==
Sundby got his international breakthrough when he won his first individual victory on 30 November 2008 in Kuusamo, Finland. The victory was regarded as a major surprise, despite Sundby delivering several solid displays in earlier races. At lower levels, Sundby has won a junior sprint event in 2003, a 30 km Scandinavian Cup race in 2007, and a 10 km FIS race in 2007. He later won the team sprint event at the test event in Liberec, Czech Republic on 17 February 2008.

Sundby and compatriot Therese Johaug became the first Norwegians to win the Tour de Ski when they won the men's and women' competitions in the 2013–14 edition of the race. Sundby subsequently won the overall and distance competitions in the 2013–14 FIS Cross-Country World Cup. He also won the 2016 Tour de Ski. In addition to his Tour de Ski victories, Sundby won the inaugural Ski Tour Canada, despite starting behind Sergey Ustiugov and Petter Northug on the final stage.

== Doping violation ==
In January 2015 Norwegian Ski Federation "was informed that Johnsrud Sundby had crossed the legal limit, the so called 'decision limit', in regard to the use of" [salbutamol trademarked as] Ventolin; the federation should have acted then, is the opinion of Fredrik Aukland, NRK's expert on crosscountry skiing.

On 20 July 2016 Johnsrud Sundby was banned from competition for two months by the Court of Arbitration for Sport (CAS) for an anti-doping rule violation. His use of asthma medication salbutamol, resulted in test levels of urine sample, exceeding the very high 1000 ng/ml limits set in the anti-doping rules by 35% for two samples collected in competition, on 13 December 2014 and 8 January 2015. The facts of the case were undisputed and the decision focused on the meaning of the term "inhaled salbutamol", specifically whether the 1600 μg per day limit referred to the "labelled dose" or the "delivered dose". The CAS panel decided that the intended meaning was the former, but criticised the drafting of the rule. For this and other reasons, including that Johnsrud Sundby declared salbutamol at the time of the test, the panel found his degree of fault light and opted for a short sanction. As the tests were taken in competition, the two results were automatically stripped. This led to Johnsrud Sundby losing the 2015 Tour de Ski title and the overall world cup title for the 2014–15 season. Apart from the subsequent stages of the 2015 Tour de Ski, no other results were affected. His short suspension took place in summer months outside the competitive skiing season.

At a 21 October 2016 national convention of Norwegian Ski Federation (NSF), some of the local representatives had a critical view on the federation having compensated Johnsrud Sundby for his loss of prize money due to his breaking the rules against doping.

== Cross-country skiing results ==
All results are sourced from the International Ski Federation (FIS).

=== Olympic Games ===
- 5 medals – (2 gold, 2 silver, 1 bronze)

| Year | Age | 15 km individual | 30 km skiathlon | 50 km mass start | Sprint | 4 × 10 km relay | Team sprint |
|---|---|---|---|---|---|---|---|
| 2010 | 25 | 33 | 18 | 15 | — | Silver | — |
| 2014 | 29 | 13 | Bronze | 4 | — | 4 | — |
| 2018 | 33 | 4 | Silver | 5 | — | Gold | Gold |

=== World Championships ===
- 9 medals – (4 gold, 3 silver, 2 bronze)

| Year | Age | 15 km individual | 30 km skiathlon | 50 km mass start | Sprint | 4 × 10 km relay | Team sprint |
|---|---|---|---|---|---|---|---|
| 2009 | 24 | 34 | — | — | — | — | — |
| 2011 | 26 | Bronze | 5 | 24 | — | Gold | — |
| 2013 | 28 | — | Silver | — | — | — | — |
| 2015 | 30 | — | — | 11 | — | — | — |
| 2017 | 32 | Silver | Silver | 5 | — | Gold | — |
| 2019 | 34 | Gold | Bronze | 4 | — | Gold | — |
| 2021 | 36 | 7 | — | — | — | — | — |

=== World Cup ===
==== Season titles ====
- 6 titles – (3 overall, 3 distance)

| Season | |
| Season | Discipline |
| 2014 | Overall |
| 2014 | Distance |
| 2016 | Overall |
| 2016 | Distance |
| 2017 | Overall |
| 2017 | Distance |

==== Season standings ====
| Season | Age | Discipline standings | | | Ski Tour standings | | | | |
| Season | Age | Overall | Distance | Sprint | Nordic Opening | Tour de Ski | Ski Tour 2020 | World Cup Final | Ski Tour Canada |
|---|---|---|---|---|---|---|---|---|---|
| 2005 | 20 | NC | NC | — | —N/a | —N/a | —N/a | —N/a | —N/a |
| 2006 | 21 | NC | NC | — | —N/a | —N/a | —N/a | —N/a | —N/a |
| 2007 | 22 | 146 | 95 | — | —N/a | — | —N/a | —N/a | —N/a |
| 2008 | 23 | 68 | 42 | — | —N/a | — | —N/a | 37 | —N/a |
| 2009 | 24 | 13 | 12 | 108 | —N/a | 8 | —N/a | 18 | —N/a |
| 2010 | 25 | 42 | 28 | 103 | —N/a | 20 | —N/a | DNF | —N/a |
| 2011 | 26 | 28 | 19 | 74 | DNF | — | —N/a | 20 | —N/a |
| 2012 | 27 | 19 | 14 | 99 | — | — | —N/a | 4 | —N/a |
| 2013 | 28 | 8 | 6 | 103 | 6 | — | —N/a | 3rd place, bronze medalist(s) | —N/a |
| 2014 | 29 | 1st place, gold medalist(s) | 1st place, gold medalist(s) | 26 | 1st place, gold medalist(s) | 1st place, gold medalist(s) | —N/a | 1st place, gold medalist(s) | —N/a |
| 2015 | 30 | 6 | 2nd place, silver medalist(s) | 35 | 1st place, gold medalist(s) | DSQ | —N/a | —N/a | —N/a |
| 2016 | 31 | 1st place, gold medalist(s) | 1st place, gold medalist(s) | 13 | 1st place, gold medalist(s) | 1st place, gold medalist(s) | —N/a | —N/a | 1st place, gold medalist(s) |
| 2017 | 32 | 1st place, gold medalist(s) | 1st place, gold medalist(s) | 38 | 1st place, gold medalist(s) | 2nd place, silver medalist(s) | —N/a | — | —N/a |
| 2018 | 33 | 3 | 2nd place, silver medalist(s) | 52 | 2nd place, silver medalist(s) | 2nd place, silver medalist(s) | —N/a | 4 | —N/a |
| 2019 | 34 | 9 | 3rd place, bronze medalist(s) | 58 | 24 | 7 | —N/a | — | —N/a |
| 2020 | 35 | 25 | 15 | 71 | 15 | — | DNF | —N/a | —N/a |

==== Individual podiums ====
- 30 victories (19 WC, 11 SWC)
- 74 podiums (43 WC, 31 SWC)

| No. | Season | Date | Location | Race | Level | Place |
|---|---|---|---|---|---|---|
| 1 | 2008–09 | 30 November 2008 | Rukatunturi, Finland | 15 km Individual C | World Cup | 1st |
| 2 | 2008–09 | 31 December 2008 | Nové Město, Czech Republic | 15 km Individual C | Stage World Cup | 2nd |
| 3 | 2010–11 | 19 February 2011 | Drammen, Norway | 15 km Individual C | World Cup | 2nd |
| 4 | 2011–12 | 3 March 2012 | Lahti, Finland | 15 km + 15 km Skiathlon C/F | World Cup | 2nd |
| 5 | 2011–12 | 10 March 2012 | Oslo, Norway | 50 km Mass Start C | World Cup | 3rd |
| 6 | 2012–13 | 24 November 2012 | Gällivare, Sweden | 15 km Individual F | World Cup | 1st |
| 7 | 2012–13 | 2 December 2012 | Rukatunturi, Finland | 15 km Pursuit C | Stage World Cup | 3rd |
| 8 | 2012–13 | 10 March 2013 | Lahti, Finland | 15 km Individual C | Stage World Cup | 3rd |
| 9 | 2012–13 | 16 March 2013 | Oslo, Norway | 50 km Mass Start F | World Cup | 2nd |
| 10 | 2012–13 | 23 March 2013 | Falun, Sweden | 15 km Mass Start C | Stage World Cup | 3rd |
| 11 | 2012–13 | 24 March 2013 | Falun, Sweden | 15 km Pursuit F | Stage World Cup | 2nd |
| 12 | 2012–13 | 20–24 March 2013 | (Sweden) World Cup Final | Overall Standings | World Cup | 3rd |
| 13 | 2013–14 | 29 November – 1 December 2013 | (Finland) Nordic Opening | Overall Standings | World Cup | 1st |
| 14 | 2013–14 | 14 December 2013 | Davos, Switzerland | 30 km Individual F | World Cup | 3rd |
| 15 | 2013–14 | 29 December 2013 | Oberhof, Germany | 1.5 km Sprint F | Stage World Cup | 3rd |
| 16 | 2013–14 | 31 December 2013 | Lenzerheide, Switzerland | 1.5 km Sprint F | Stage World Cup | 3rd |
| 17 | 2013–14 | 3 January 2014 | Cortina-Toblach, Italy | 35 km Pursuit F | Stage World Cup | 1st |
| 18 | 2013–14 | 4 January 2014 | Val di Fiemme, Italy | 10 km Individual C | Stage World Cup | 2nd |
| 19 | 2013–14 | 28 December 2013 – 5 January 2014 | (Germany) (Switzerland) (Italy) Tour de Ski | Overall Standings | World Cup | 1st |
| 20 | 2013–14 | 2 March 2014 | Lahti, Finland | 15 km Individual F | World Cup | 1st |
| 21 | 2013–14 | 8 March 2014 | Oslo, Norway | 50 km Mass Start C | World Cup | 2nd |
| 22 | 2013–14 | 15 March 2014 | Falun, Sweden | 15 km + 15 km Skiathlon C/F | Stage World Cup | 2nd |
| 23 | 2013–14 | 16 March 2014 | Falun, Sweden | 15 km Pursuit F | Stage World Cup | 1st |
| 24 | 2013–14 | 14–16 March 2014 | (Sweden) World Cup Final | Overall Standings | World Cup | 1st |
| 25 | 2014–15 | 30 November 2014 | Rukatunturi, Finland | 15 km Individual C | World Cup | 2nd |
| 26 | 2014–15 | 6 December 2014 | Lillehammer, Norway | 10 km Individual F | Stage World Cup | 1st |
| 27 | 2014–15 | 7 December 2014 | Lillehammer, Norway | 15 km Pursuit C | Stage World Cup | 3rd |
| 28 | 2014–15 | 5–7 December 2014 | (Norway) Nordic Opening | Overall Standings | World Cup | 1st |
| 29 | 2014–15 | 6 January 2015 | Val Müstair, Switzerland | 1.4 km Sprint F | Stage World Cup | 3rd |
| 30 | 2014–15 | 7 January 2015 | Toblach, Italy | 10 km Individual C | Stage World Cup | 3rd |
| 31 | 2014–15 | 14 March 2015 | Oslo, Norway | 50 km Mass Start F | World Cup | 3rd |
| 32 | 2015–16 | 28 November 2015 | Rukatunturi, Finland | 10 km Individual F | Stage World Cup | 1st |
| 33 | 2015–16 | 29 November 2015 | Rukatunturi, Finland | 15 km Pursuit C | Stage World Cup | 2nd |
| 34 | 2015–16 | 27–29 November 2015 | (Finland) Nordic Opening | Overall Standings | World Cup | 1st |
| 35 | 2015–16 | 5 December 2015 | Lillehammer, Norway | 15 km + 15 km Skiathlon C/F | World Cup | 1st |
| 36 | 2015–16 | 12 December 2015 | Davos, Switzerland | 30 km Individual F | World Cup | 1st |
| 37 | 2015–16 | 20 December 2015 | Toblach, Italy | 15 km Individual C | World Cup | 1st |
| 38 | 2015–16 | 2 January 2016 | Lenzerheide, Switzerland | 30 km Mass Start C | Stage World Cup | 1st |
| 39 | 2015–16 | 3 January 2016 | Lenzerheide, Switzerland | 10 km Pursuit F | Stage World Cup | 1st |
| 40 | 2015–16 | 8 January 2016 | Toblach, Italy | 10 km Individual F | Stage World Cup | 2nd |
| 41 | 2015–16 | 9 January 2016 | Val di Fiemme, Italy | 15 km Mass Start C | Stage World Cup | 1st |
| 42 | 2015–16 | 10 January 2016 | Val di Fiemme, Italy | 9 km Pursuit F | Stage World Cup | 1st |
| 43 | 2015–16 | 1–10 January 2016 | (Switzerland) (Germany) (Italy) Tour de Ski | Overall Standings | World Cup | 1st |
| 44 | 2015–16 | 23 January 2016 | Nové Město, Czech Republic | 15 km Individual F | World Cup | 2nd |
| 45 | 2015–16 | 6 February 2016 | Oslo, Norway | 50 km Mass Start C | World Cup | 1st |
| 46 | 2015–16 | 14 February 2016 | Falun, Sweden | 15 km Mass Start F | World Cup | 3rd |
| 47 | 2015–16 | 21 February 2016 | Lahti, Finland | 15 km + 15 km Skiathlon C/F | World Cup | 1st |
| 48 | 2015–16 | 9 March 2016 | Canmore, Canada | 15 km + 15 km Skiathlon C/F | Stage World Cup | 1st |
| 49 | 2015–16 | 12 March 2016 | Canmore, Canada | 15 km Pursuit C | Stage World Cup | 3rd |
| 50 | 2015–16 | 1–12 March 2016 | Ski Tour Canada | Overall Standings | World Cup | 1st |
| 51 | 2016–17 | 27 November 2016 | Rukatunturi, Finland | 15 km Individual C | World Cup | 3rd |
| 52 | 2016–17 | 4 December 2016 | Lillehammer, Norway | 15 km Pursuit C | Stage World Cup | 2nd |
| 53 | 2016–17 | 2–4 December 2016 | (Norway) Nordic Opening | Overall Standings | World Cup | 1st |
| 54 | 2016–17 | 10 December 2016 | Davos, Switzerland | 30 km Individual F | World Cup | 1st |
| 55 | 2016–17 | 17 December 2016 | La Clusaz, France | 15 km Mass Start F | World Cup | 2nd |
| 56 | 2016–17 | 1 January 2017 | Val Müstair, Switzerland | 10 km Mass Start C | Stage World Cup | 2nd |
| 57 | 2016–17 | 3 January 2017 | Oberstdorf, Germany | 10 km + 10 km Skiathlon C/F | Stage World Cup | 2nd |
| 58 | 2016–17 | 4 January 2017 | Oberstdorf, Germany | 15 km Pursuit F | Stage World Cup | 2nd |
| 59 | 2016–17 | 7 January 2017 | Val di Fiemme, Italy | 15 km Mass Start C | Stage World Cup | 1st |
| 60 | 2016–17 | 31 December 2016 – 8 January 2017 | (Switzerland) (Germany) (Italy) Tour de Ski | Overall Standings | World Cup | 2nd |
| 61 | 2016–17 | 21 January 2017 | Ulricehamn, Sweden | 15 km Individual F | World Cup | 2nd |
| 62 | 2016–17 | 29 January 2017 | Falun, Sweden | 30 km Mass Start C | World Cup | 2nd |
| 63 | 2016–17 | 19 February 2017 | Otepää, Estonia | 15 km Individual C | World Cup | 1st |
| 64 | 2016–17 | 11 March 2017 | Oslo, Norway | 50 km Mass Start C | World Cup | 1st |
| 65 | 2017–18 | 24–26 November 2017 | (Finland) Nordic Opening | Overall Standings | World Cup | 2nd |
| 66 | 2017–18 | 3 December 2017 | Lillehammer, Norway | 15 km + 15 km Skiathlon C/F | World Cup | 2nd |
| 67 | 2017–18 | 31 December 2017 | Lenzerheide, Switzerland | 15 km Individual C | Stage World Cup | 3rd |
| 68 | 2017–18 | 7 January 2018 | Val di Fiemme, Italy | 9 km Pursuit F | Stage World Cup | 1st |
| 69 | 2017–18 | 30 December 2017 – 7 January 2018 | (Switzerland) (Germany) (Italy) Tour de Ski | Overall Standings | World Cup | 2nd |
| 70 | 2017–18 | 28 January 2018 | Seefeld, Austria | 15 km Mass Start F | World Cup | 3rd |
| 71 | 2017–18 | 10 March 2018 | Oslo, Norway | 50 km Mass Start F | World Cup | 2nd |
| 72 | 2018–19 | 8 December 2018 | Beitostølen, Norway | 30 km Individual F | World Cup | 2nd |
| 73 | 2018–19 | 16 December 2018 | Davos, Switzerland | 15 km Individual F | World Cup | 3rd |
| 74 | 2018–19 | 17 March 2019 | Falun, Sweden | 15 km Individual F | World Cup | 2nd |

==== Team podiums ====
- 14 victories (13 RL, 1 TS)
- 18 podiums (17 RL, 1 TS)

| No. | Season | Date | Location | Race | Level | Place | Teammate(s) |
|---|---|---|---|---|---|---|---|
| 1 | 2007–08 | 25 November 2007 | Beitostølen, Norway | 4 × 10 km Relay C/F | World Cup | 1st | Svartedal / Hofstad / Hetland |
| 2 | 2007–08 | 17 February 2008 | Liberec, Czech Republic | 6 × 1.4 km Team Sprint C | World Cup | 1st | Østensen |
| 3 | 2007–08 | 24 February 2008 | Falun, Sweden | 4 × 10 km Relay C/F | World Cup | 1st | Jespersen / Eilifsen / Northug |
| 4 | 2008–09 | 23 November 2008 | Gällivare, Sweden | 4 × 10 km Relay C/F | World Cup | 1st | Rønning / Hofstad / Northug |
| 5 | 2008–09 | 7 December 2008 | La Clusaz, France | 4 × 10 km Relay C/F | World Cup | 1st | Hetland / Gjerdalen / Northug |
| 6 | 2009–10 | 22 November 2009 | Beitostølen, Norway | 4 × 10 km Relay C/F | World Cup | 1st | Rønning / Hafsås / Northug |
| 7 | 2009–10 | 7 March 2010 | Lahti, Finland | 4 × 10 km Relay C/F | World Cup | 2nd | Rønning / Eliassen / Gjerdalen |
| 8 | 2010–11 | 21 November 2010 | Gällivare, Sweden | 4 × 10 km Relay C/F | World Cup | 3rd | Rønning / Jespersen / Røthe |
| 9 | 2010–11 | 19 December 2010 | La Clusaz, France | 4 × 10 km Relay C/F | World Cup | 2nd | Rønning / Gjerdalen / Northug |
| 10 | 2011–12 | 12 February 2012 | Nové Město, Czech Republic | 4 × 10 km Relay C/F | World Cup | 1st | Rønning / Dyrhaug / Northug |
| 11 | 2012–13 | 25 November 2012 | Gällivare, Sweden | 4 × 7.5 km Relay C/F | World Cup | 1st | Rønning / Røthe / Northug |
| 12 | 2012–13 | 20 January 2013 | La Clusaz, France | 4 × 7.5 km Relay C/F | World Cup | 1st | Rønning / Tønseth / Røthe |
| 13 | 2013–14 | 8 December 2013 | Lillehammer, Norway | 4 × 7.5 km Relay C/F | World Cup | 3rd | Golberg / Tønseth / Northug |
| 14 | 2015–16 | 6 December 2015 | Lillehammer, Norway | 4 × 7.5 km Relay C/F | World Cup | 1st | Dyrhaug / Holund / Northug |
| 15 | 2015–16 | 24 January 2016 | Nové Město, Czech Republic | 4 × 7.5 km Relay C/F | World Cup | 1st | Røthe / Rundgreen / Krogh |
| 16 | 2016–17 | 18 December 2016 | La Clusaz, France | 4 × 7.5 km Relay C/F | World Cup | 1st | Tønseth / Gløersen / Krogh |
| 17 | 2016–17 | 22 January 2017 | Ulricehamn, Sweden | 4 × 7.5 km Relay C/F | World Cup | 1st | Krüger / Gløersen / Krogh |
| 18 | 2018–19 | 9 December 2018 | Beitostølen, Norway | 4 × 7.5 km Relay C/F | World Cup | 1st | Iversen / Røthe / Krogh |
