= Laila Selbæk Rønning =

Norwegian cross-country skier

Personal information
- Nationality: Norway
- Born: 24 November 1981 (age 44)
- Spouse: Eldar Rønning

Sport
- Sport: Skiing
- Club: IL Nor

World Cup career
- Seasons: 4 – (2002–2004, 2006)
- Indiv. starts: 6
- Indiv. podiums: 0
- Team starts: 0
- Overall titles: 0 – (98th in 2003)
- Discipline titles: 0
Medal record
Women's cross-country skiing
Representing Norway
U23 World Championships
Bronze medal – third place	2003 Valdidentro	10 km double pursuit
Junior World Championships
Bronze medal – third place	2000 Štrbské Pleso	4 × 5 km relay
- Updated on 31 December 2021

Laila Selbæk Rønning (born 24 November 1981) is a retired Norwegian cross-country skier. She competed at the 2000 and 2001 Junior World Championships, managing a 25th and a 26th place. She made her World Cup debut in the March 2002 Oslo sprint race. She collected her first World Cup points at the 2003 Holmenkollen ski festival, finishing 28th in the 30 km. Her last World Cup outing came at the 2006 Holmenkollen ski festival. She represented the sports clubs IL Nor (Meldal) and Strindheim IL. She is married to fellow cross-country skier Eldar Rønning.

== Cross-country skiing results ==
All results are sourced from the International Ski Federation (FIS).

=== World Cup ===
==== Season standings ====
Season	Age			
Season	Age	Overall	Distance	Sprint
2002	20	NC	—N/a	NC
2003	21	98	—N/a	NC
2004	22	NC	NC	—
2006	24	NC	NC	—
