= Chris Jespersen =

Norwegian cross-country skier

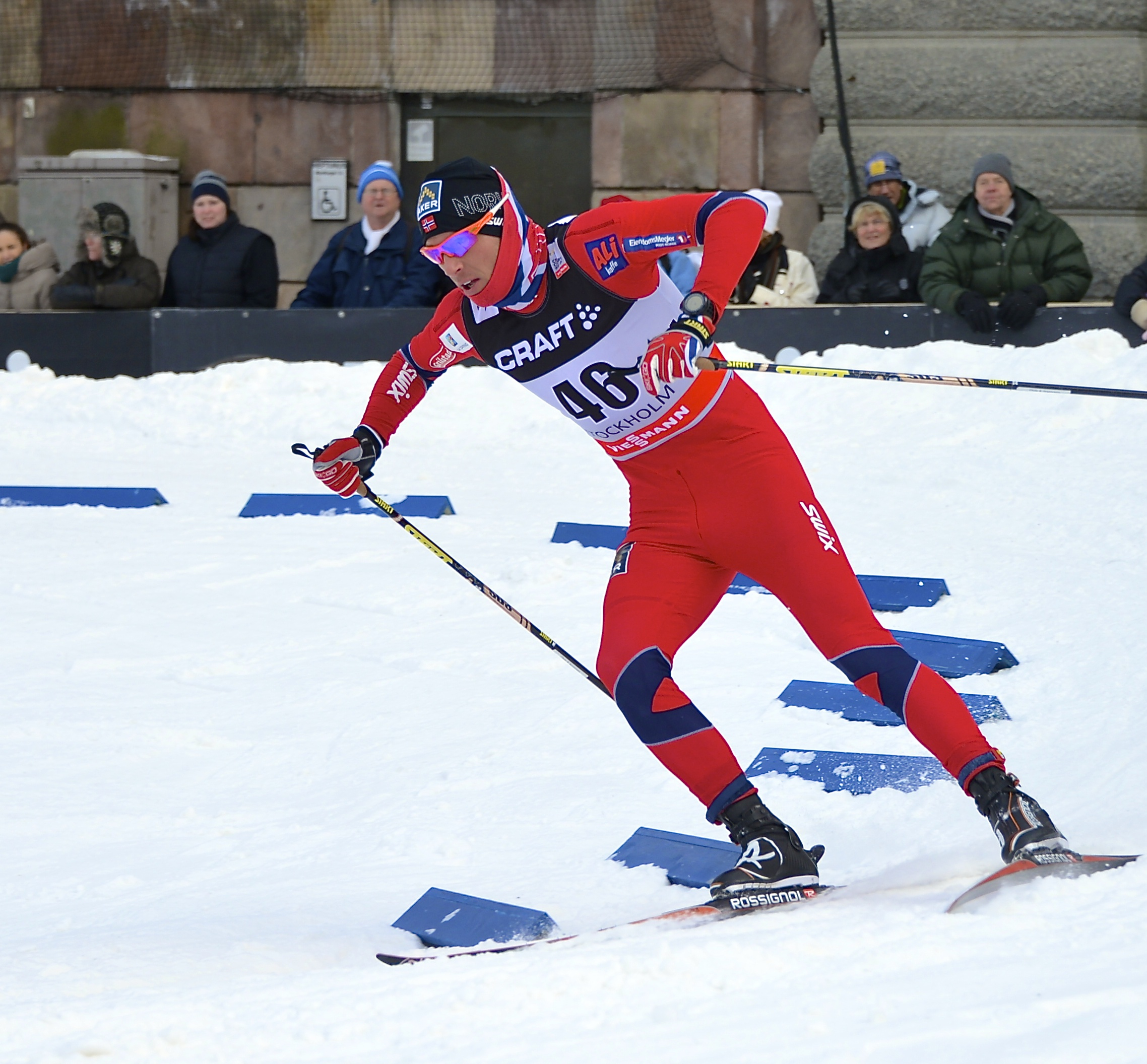

Personal information
- Full name: Chris André Jespersen
- Nationality: Norway
- Born: 18 October 1983 (age 43) Skånevik, Hordaland, Norway
- Height: 187 cm (6 ft 2 in)

Sport
- Sport: Skiing
- Club: Strindheim IL

World Cup career
- Seasons: 13 – (2004, 2006, 2008–2016, 2018–2019)
- Indiv. starts: 67
- Indiv. podiums: 6
- Indiv. wins: 1
- Team starts: 6
- Team podiums: 3
- Team wins: 1
- Overall titles: 0 – (4th in 2014)
- Discipline titles: 0
Medal record
Men's cross-country skiing
Representing Norway
Junior World Championships
Gold medal – first place	2003 Sollefteå	30 km freestyle
Silver medal – second place	2003 Sollefteå	4 × 10 km relay

Chris André Jespersen (born 18 October 1983) is a Norwegian cross-country skier who has competed since 2002. His best World Cup finishes were second in a 30 km event in Davos in 2013, and second in the 2013–14 Tour de Ski. Jespersen's lone win was in the 4 × 10 km relay in 2008, also in Sweden.

Jespersen represented Norway at the 2014 Winter Olympics in Sochi, Russia. He competed in the 15 km, finishing sixth, the 50 km, finishing 32nd, and in the 4 × 10 km relay, finishing fourth. Their fourth place finish was subsequently upgraded to a bronze medal following the disqualification of the Russian team. During the 15 km time trial, Jespersen came to international attention when, in addition to wearing a short-sleeved top, he opted to cut his ski tights off at the thigh and race with bare legs. Although temperatures at the games were often uncharacteristically mild, the incongruous sight of a winter athlete skiing in shorts and a t-shirt was remarked on by commentators and audiences worldwide.

== Cross-country skiing results ==
All results are sourced from the International Ski Federation (FIS).

=== Olympic Games ===
Year	Age	15 km individual	30 km skiathlon	50 km mass start	Sprint	4 × 10 km relay	Team sprint
2014	30	6	—	32	—	4	—

=== World Championships ===
Year	Age	15 km individual	30 km skiathlon	50 km mass start	Sprint	4 × 10 km relay	Team sprint
2015	31	8	—	—	—	—	—

=== World Cup ===
==== Season standings ====
Season	Age	Discipline standings			Ski Tour standings			
Season	Age	Overall	Distance	Sprint	Nordic Opening	Tour de Ski	World Cup Final	Ski Tour Canada
2004	20	NC	NC	—	—N/a	—N/a	—N/a	—N/a
2006	22	NC	NC	—	—N/a	—N/a	—N/a	—N/a
2008	24	NC	NC	—	—N/a	—	—	—N/a
2009	25	120	72	—	—N/a	—	—	—N/a
2010	26	178	118	—	—N/a	—	—	—N/a
2011	27	85	49	NC	DNF	—	—	—N/a
2012	28	78	53	NC	25	—	—	—N/a
2013	29	49	37	NC	17	—	30	—N/a
2014	30	4	4	104	8	2nd place, silver medalist(s)	DNF	—N/a
2015	31	12	12	NC	17	8	—N/a	—N/a
2016	32	95	55	—	—	—	—N/a	—
2018	34	NC	NC	—	—	—	—	—N/a
2019	35	64	37	—	—	—	—	—N/a

==== Individual podiums ====
- 1 victory – (1 SWC)
- 6 podiums – (3 WC, 3 SWC)

No.	Season	Date	Location	Race	Level	Place
1	2013–14	14 December 2013	Davos, Switzerland	30 km Individual F	World Cup	2nd
2	2013–14	28 December 2013	Oberhof, Germany	4.5 km Individual F	Stage World Cup	3rd
3	2013–14	4 January 2014	Val di Fiemme, Italy	10 km Individual C	Stage World Cup	3rd
4	2013–14	5 January 2014	Val di Fiemme, Italy	9 km Pursuit F	Stage World Cup	1st
5	2013–14	28 December 2013 – 5 January 2014	(Germany) (Switzerland) (Italy) Tour de Ski	Overall Standings	World Cup	2nd
6	2014–15	5 January 2014	Davos, Switzerland	15 km Individual C	World Cup	3rd

==== Team podiums ====
- 1 victory – (1 RL)
- 3 podiums – (3 RL)

No.	Season	Date	Location	Race	Level	Place	Teammates
1	2007–08	24 February 2008	Falun, Sweden	4 × 10 km Relay C/F	World Cup	1st	Sundby / Eilifsen / Northug
2	2010–11	21 November 2010	Gällivare, Sweden	4 × 10 km Relay C/F	World Cup	3rd	Rønning / Sundby / Røthe
3	2013–14	8 December 2013	Lillehammer, Norway	4 × 7.5 km Relay C/F	World Cup	2nd	Rønning / Røthe / Krogh
