= Eldar Rønning =

Norwegian cross-country skier

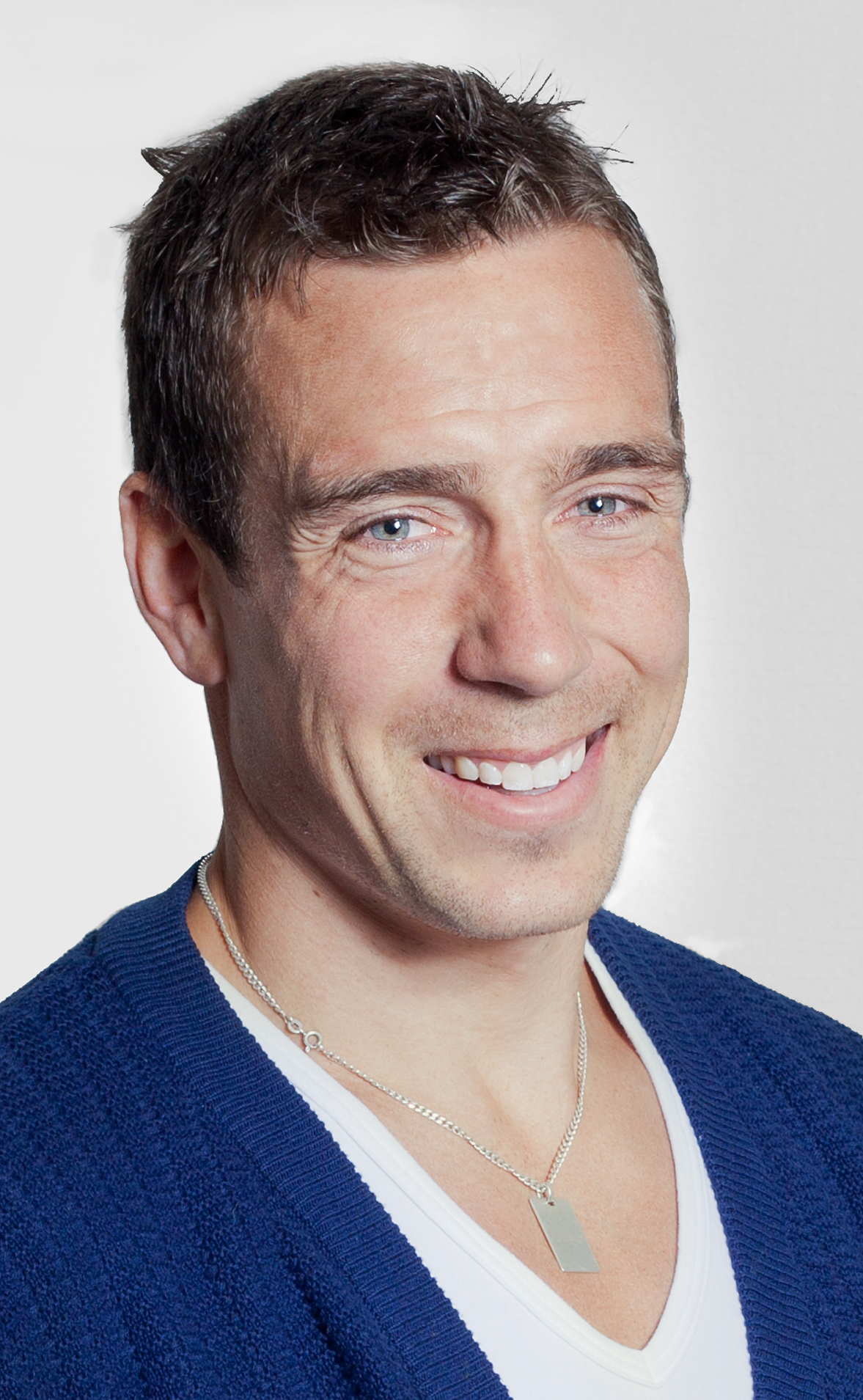
- Eldar Rønning in September 2013

Personal information
- Nationality: Norway
- Born: 11 June 1982 (age 44) Levanger, Norway
- Spouse: Laila Selbæk Rønning

Sport
- Sport: Skiing
- Club: Skogn IL

World Cup career
- Seasons: 14 – (2002–2015)
- Indiv. starts: 192
- Indiv. podiums: 24
- Indiv. wins: 11
- Team starts: 28
- Team podiums: 20
- Team wins: 8
- Overall titles: 0 – (3rd in 2007)
- Discipline titles: 0
Medal record
Men's cross-country skiing
Representing Norway
World Championships
Gold medal – first place	2007 Sapporo	4 × 10 km relay
Gold medal – first place	2009 Liberec	4 × 10 km relay
Gold medal – first place	2011 Oslo	4 × 10 km relay
Gold medal – first place	2013 Val di Fiemme	4 × 10 km relay
Silver medal – second place	2011 Oslo	15 km classical
Bronze medal – third place	2007 Sapporo	Individual sprint
- Updated on 2 April 2019

Eldar Rønning (born 11 June 1982 in Levanger Municipality) is a Norwegian former cross-country skier. He skis with the Skogn IL club, in Nord-Trøndelag.

== Career ==
In 2004/05, he achieved three podium finishes in World Cup Sprint events, including a win at Reit im Winkl. He finished the season in 10th, 235 points behind overall winner Axel Teichmann. He was 62nd in the distance standings, 520 points behind Teichmann, and came second in the sprint discipline, 237 points behind fellow countryman Tor Arne Hetland. He also came second in the sprint discipline at the Norwegian national championships.

Rønning shared the 2005/06 season between the World Cup and the Scandinavian Cup, competing almost exclusively in sprints. He only competed in one World Cup race that was not either a sprint or a pursuit, it was a 15 km classic style race in Davos, Rønning finished 30th, 1:25.9 behind winner Jens Arne Svartedal. His best World Cup result was a third place achieved in a classic sprint in Drammen, a race in which the top four were Norwegian, and was won again by Svartedal. Rønning also came fifth twice, both in sprints, his only other race in the World Cup when he finished inside the top 20, was a 16th place in a sprint, in Oberstdorf. Rønning finished the season in 11th place in the FIS World Cup overall standings, 474 points behind German Tobias Angerer. Rønning was 28th in the distance standings, 671 points behind Angerer, and 7th in the sprint standings, 349 points behind sprint winner Björn Lind.

Rønning has won six World Cup races (15 km classical – three times, classical sprint – twice, and freestyle sprint) and three World Cup stages (all in Tour de Ski, 30 km classical mass start, 20 km classical mass start, classical sprint). In addition he has eight individual World Cup podiums.

Rønning has earned six medals at the FIS Nordic World Ski Championships with four golds (4 × 10 km relay 2007, 2009, 2011, 2013), one silver (15 km classical 2011) and a bronze (classical sprint 2007).

== Cross-country skiing results ==
All results are sourced from the International Ski Federation (FIS).

=== Olympic Games ===
Year	Age	15 km individual	30 km skiathlon	50 km mass start	Sprint	4 × 10 km relay	Team sprint
2010	27	—	36	—	—	—	—
2014	31	12	—	—	—	4	—

=== World Championships ===
- 6 medals – (4 gold, 1 silver, 1 bronze)

Year	Age	15 km individual	30 km skiathlon	50 km mass start	Sprint	4 × 10 km relay	Team sprint
2005	22	21	—	—	11	—	—
2007	24	—	12	27	Bronze	Gold	—
2009	26	7	28	—	—	Gold	—
2011	28	Silver	—	—	—	Gold	—
2013	30	—	32	5	—	Gold	—

=== World Cup ===
==== Season standings ====
Season	Age	Discipline standings			Ski Tour standings		
Season	Age	Overall	Distance	Sprint	Nordic Opening	Tour de Ski	World Cup Final
2002	19	NC	—N/a	NC	—N/a	—N/a	—N/a
2003	20	62	—N/a	36	—N/a	—N/a	—N/a
2004	21	53	104	20	—N/a	—N/a	—N/a
2005	22	10	62	2nd place, silver medalist(s)	—N/a	—N/a	—N/a
2006	23	11	28	7	—N/a	—N/a	—N/a
2007	24	3rd place, bronze medalist(s)	4	5	—N/a	17	—N/a
2008	25	13	21	7	—N/a	26	DNF
2009	26	12	15	12	—N/a	13	16
2010	27	15	25	17	—N/a	DNF	13
2011	28	19	11	41	21	—	18
2012	29	10	12	46	3rd place, bronze medalist(s)	22	13
2013	30	36	29	36	34	—	16
2014	31	24	21	28	DNF	—	10
2015	32	31	30	NC	25	17	—N/a

==== Individual podiums ====
- 11 victories (7 WC, 4 SWC)
- 24 podiums (15 WC, 9 SWC)

No.	Season	Date	Location	Race	Level	Place
1	2004–05	13 February 2005	Reit im Winkl, Germany	1.2 km Sprint C	World Cup	1st
2	2004–05	5 March 2005	Lahti, Finland	1.4 km Sprint C	World Cup	3rd
3	2004–05	9 March 2005	Drammen, Norway	1.2 km Sprint C	World Cup	2nd
4	2005–06	9 March 2006	Drammen, Norway	1.2 km Sprint C	World Cup	3rd
5	2006–07	28 October 2006	Düsseldorf, Germany	1.5 km Sprint F	World Cup	1st
6	2006–07	26 November 2006	Rukatunturi, Finland	15 km Individual C	World Cup	1st
7	2006–07	13 December 2006	Cogne, Italy	15 km Individual C	World Cup	1st
8	2006–07	6 January 2007	Cavalese, Italy	30 km Mass Start C	Stage World Cup	1st
9	2006–07	10 March 2007	Lahti, Finland	1.4 km Sprint F	World Cup	3rd
10	2006–07	11 March 2007	Lahti, Finland	15 km Individual C	World Cup	2nd
11	2007–08	2 December 2007	Rukatunturi, Finland	15 km Individual C	World Cup	2nd
12	2007–08	23 January 2008	Canmore, Canada	1.2 km Sprint C	World Cup	3rd
13	2007–08	10 February 2008	Otepää, Estonia	1.4 km Sprint C	World Cup	1st
14	2008–09	18 March 2009	Stockholm, Sweden	1.0 km Sprint C	Stage World Cup	3rd
15	2009–10	3 January 2010	Oberhof, Germany	1.6 km Sprint C	Stage World Cup	1st
16	2010–11	22 January 2011	Otepää, Estonia	15 km Individual C	World Cup	1st
17	2011–12	27 November 2011	Rukatunturi, Finland	15 km Pursuit C	Stage World Cup	2nd
18	2011–12	27 November 2011	(Finland) Nordic Opening	Overall Standings	World Cup	3rd
19	2011–12	3 January 2012	Toblach, Italy	5 km Individual C	Stage World Cup	2nd
20	2011–12	7 January 2012	Val di Fiemme, Italy	20 km Mass Start C	Stage World Cup	1st
21	2011–12	10 March 2012	Oslo, Norway	50 km Mass Start C	World Cup	1st
22	2011–12	17 March 2012	Falun, Sweden	15 km Mass Start C	Stage World Cup	2nd
23	2012–13	23 March 2013	Falun, Sweden	15 km Mass Start C	Stage World Cup	1st
24	2013–14	30 November 2013	Rukatunturi, Finland	10 km Individual C	Stage World Cup	2nd

==== Team podiums ====
- 8 victories – (6 RL, 2 TS)
- 20 podiums – (13 RL, 7 TS)

No.	Season	Date	Location	Race	Level	Place	Teammate(s)
1	2005–06	23 October 2005	Düsseldorf, Germany	6 × 1.5 km Team Sprint F	World Cup	3rd	Hetland
2	2005–06	20 November 2005	Beitostølen, Norway	4 × 10 km Relay C/F	World Cup	3rd	Svartedal / Hetland / Hofstad
3	2005–06	18 December 2005	Canmore, Canada	6 × 1.2 km Team Sprint C	World Cup	1st	Svartedal
4	2005–06	18 March 2006	Sapporo, Japan	6 × 1.5 km Team Sprint F	World Cup	2nd	Kjølstad
5	2006–07	29 October 2006	Düsseldorf, Germany	6 × 1.5 km Team Sprint F	World Cup	2nd	Pettersen
6	2006–07	17 December 2006	La Clusaz, France	4 × 10 km Relay C/F	World Cup	2nd	Bjørndalen / Hetland / Northug
7	2007–08	25 November 2007	Beitostølen, Norway	4 × 10 km Relay C/F	World Cup	2nd	Hjelmeset / Eilifsen / Gjerdalen
8	2007–08	17 February 2008	Liberec, Czech Republic	6 × 1.4 km Team Sprint C	World Cup	3rd	Dahl
9	2008–09	23 November 2008	Gällivare, Sweden	4 × 10 km Relay C/F	World Cup	1st	Sundby / Hofstad / Northug
10	2009–10	22 November 2009	Beitostølen, Norway	4 × 10 km Relay C/F	World Cup	1st	Sundby / Hafsås / Northug
11	2009–10	7 March 2010	Lahti, Finland	4 × 10 km Relay C/F	World Cup	2nd	Sundby / Eliassen / Gjerdalen
12	2010–11	21 November 2010	Gällivare, Sweden	4 × 10 km Relay C/F	World Cup	3rd	Sundby / Jespersen / Røthe
13	2010–11	19 December 2010	La Clusaz, France	4 × 10 km Relay C/F	World Cup	3rd	Sundby / Gjerdalen / Northug
14	2011–12	22 November 2011	Sjusjøen, Norway	4 × 10 km Relay C/F	World Cup	1st	Krogh / Berger / Northug
15	2011–12	12 January 2012	Nové Město, Czech Republic	4 × 10 km Relay C/F	World Cup	1st	Dyrhaug / Sundby / Northug
16	2012–13	25 November 2012	Gällivare, Sweden	4 × 7.5 km Relay C/F	World Cup	1st	Sundby / Røthe / Northug
17	2012–13	20 January 2013	La Clusaz, France	4 × 7.5 km Relay M	World Cup	1st	Tønseth / Sundby / Røthe
18	2013–14	8 December 2013	Lillehammer, Norway	4 × 7.5 km Relay C/F	World Cup	2nd	Jespersen / Røthe / Krogh
19	2013–14	22 December 2013	Asiago, Italy	6 × 1.65 km Team Sprint C	World Cup	1st	Hattestad
20	2013–14	14 January 2014	Nové Město, Czech Republic	6 × 1.6 km Team Sprint C	World Cup	2nd	Brandsdal

== Personal life ==
He is married to fellow cross-country skier Laila Selbæk Rønning.
