= 2013–14 FIS Cross-Country World Cup =

Cross-country skiing competition

Discipline	Men	Women
Overall	(Norway) Martin Johnsrud Sundby	(Norway) Therese Johaug
Distance	(Norway) Martin Johnsrud Sundby	(Norway) Therese Johaug
Sprint	(Norway) Ola Vigen Hattestad	(United States) Kikkan Randall
Nations Cup	Norway	Norway
- Nations Cup Overall: Norway

Stage events
Nordic Opening	(Norway) Martin Johnsrud Sundby	(Norway) Marit Bjørgen
Tour de Ski	(Norway) Martin Johnsrud Sundby	(Norway) Therese Johaug
World Cup Final	(Norway) Martin Johnsrud Sundby	(Norway) Therese Johaug

Competition
Locations	15 venues	15 venues
Individual	26 events	26 events
Relay/Team	3 events	3 events

2013–14 FIS Cross-Country World Cup was a multi-race tournament over the season for cross-country skiers. This was the 33rd official World Cup season in cross-country skiing for men and women. The season began on 29 November 2013 in Ruka, Finland, and ended on 16 March 2014 in Falun, Sweden.

This season's biggest event was the 2014 Winter Olympics.

== Calendar ==
=== Men ===
C – Classic / F – Freestyle
WC	Stage	Date	Place	Discipline	Winner	Second	Third	Yellow bib	Ref.
	1	29 November 2013	(Finland) Ruka	Sprint C	(Norway) Eirik Brandsdal	(Russia) Anton Gafarov	(Sweden) Teodor Peterson	(Norway) Eirik Brandsdal	
	2	30 November 2013	(Finland) Ruka	10 km C	(Czech Republic) Lukáš Bauer	(Norway) Eldar Rønning	(Russia) Dmitry Yaparov	(Norway) Eldar Rønning	
	3	1 December 2013	(Finland) Ruka	15 km F Pursuit	(United States) Noah Hoffman	(France) Maurice Manificat	(Sweden) Marcus Hellner	(Russia) Sergey Ustiugov	
1	4th Nordic Opening Overall (29 November – 1 December 2013)				(Norway) Martin Johnsrud Sundby	(Russia) Maxim Vylegzhanin	(Russia) Alexander Legkov	(Norway) Martin Johnsrud Sundby	
2	4	7 December 2013	(Norway) Lillehammer	15 km C	(Norway) Pål Golberg	(Kazakhstan) Alexey Poltoranin	(Norway) Didrik Tønseth	(Norway) Martin Johnsrud Sundby	
3	5	14 December 2013	(Switzerland) Davos	30 km F	(France) Maurice Manificat	(Norway) Chris Jespersen	(Norway) Martin Johnsrud Sundby	(Norway) Martin Johnsrud Sundby	
4	6	15 December 2013	(Switzerland) Davos	Sprint F	(Norway) Anders Gløersen	(Finland) Martti Jylhä	(Russia) Sergey Ustiugov	(Norway) Martin Johnsrud Sundby	
5	7	21 December 2013	(Italy) Asiago	Sprint C	(Russia) Nikita Kryukov	(Kazakhstan) Alexey Poltoranin	(Switzerland) Gianluca Cologna	(Norway) Martin Johnsrud Sundby	
	8	28 December 2013	(Germany) Oberhof	4,5 km F Prologue	(Canada) Alex Harvey	(Canada) Devon Kershaw	(Norway) Chris Jespersen	(Norway) Martin Johnsrud Sundby	
	9	29 December 2013	(Germany) Oberhof	Sprint F	(Sweden) Calle Halfvarsson	(Italy) Federico Pellegrino	(Norway) Martin Johnsrud Sundby	(Norway) Martin Johnsrud Sundby	
	10	31 December 2013	(Switzerland) Lenzerheide	Sprint F	(United States) Simeon Hamilton	(Canada) Alex Harvey	(Norway) Martin Johnsrud Sundby	(Norway) Martin Johnsrud Sundby	
	11	1 January 2014	(Switzerland) Lenzerheide	15 km C Mass Start	(Kazakhstan) Alexey Poltoranin	(Germany) Hannes Dotzler	(Russia) Stanislav Volzhentsev	(Norway) Martin Johnsrud Sundby	
	12	3 January 2014	(Italy) Cortina-Toblach	35 km F Pursuit	(Norway) Martin Johnsrud Sundby	(Norway) Petter Northug	(Canada) Alex Harvey	(Norway) Martin Johnsrud Sundby	
	13	4 January 2014	(Italy) Val di Fiemme	10 km C	(Norway) Petter Northug	(Norway) Martin Johnsrud Sundby	(Norway) Chris Jespersen	(Norway) Martin Johnsrud Sundby	
	14	5 January 2014	(Italy) Val di Fiemme	9 km F Final Climb	(Norway) Chris Jespersen	(Norway) Sjur Røthe	(Canada) Ivan Babikov	(Norway) Martin Johnsrud Sundby	
6	8th Tour de Ski Overall (28 December 2013 – 5 January 2014)				(Norway) Martin Johnsrud Sundby	(Norway) Chris Jespersen	(Norway) Petter Northug	(Norway) Martin Johnsrud Sundby	
7	15	11 January 2014	(Czech Republic) Nové Město	Sprint F	(Russia) Sergey Ustiugov	(Italy) Federico Pellegrino	(Russia) Alexey Petukhov	(Norway) Martin Johnsrud Sundby	
8	16	18 January 2014	(Poland) Szklarska Poręba	Sprint F	(Canada) Alex Harvey	(Germany) Josef Wenzl	(France) Baptiste Gros	(Norway) Martin Johnsrud Sundby	
9	17	19 January 2014	(Poland) Szklarska Poręba	15 km C Mass Start	(Russia) Maxim Vylegzhanin	(Russia) Evgeniy Belov	(Kazakhstan) Alexey Poltoranin	(Norway) Martin Johnsrud Sundby	
10	18	1 February 2014	(Italy) Toblach	15 km C	(Russia) Alexander Legkov	(Switzerland) Dario Cologna	(Sweden) Marcus Hellner	(Norway) Martin Johnsrud Sundby	
11	19	2 February 2014	(Italy) Toblach	Sprint F	(Norway) Ola Vigen Hattestad	(Norway) Eirik Brandsdal	(Germany) Josef Wenzl	(Norway) Martin Johnsrud Sundby	
2014 Winter Olympics (7–23 February)
12	20	1 March 2014	(Finland) Lahti	Sprint F	(Norway) Pål Golberg	(Russia) Alexey Petukhov	(Norway) Eirik Brandsdal	(Norway) Martin Johnsrud Sundby	
13	21	2 March 2014	(Finland) Lahti	15 km F	(Norway) Martin Johnsrud Sundby	(Sweden) Daniel Rickardsson	(Russia) Alexander Legkov	(Norway) Martin Johnsrud Sundby	
14	22	5 March 2014	(Norway) Drammen	Sprint C	(Norway) Ola Vigen Hattestad	(Norway) Pål Golberg	(Italy) Maicol Rastelli	(Norway) Martin Johnsrud Sundby	
15	23	8 March 2014	(Norway) Oslo	50 km C Mass Start	(Sweden) Daniel Rickardsson	(Norway) Martin Johnsrud Sundby	(Russia) Alexander Legkov	(Norway) Martin Johnsrud Sundby	
	24	14 March 2014	(Sweden) Falun	Sprint C	(Sweden) Teodor Peterson	(Sweden) Emil Jönsson	(Sweden) Calle Halfvarsson	(Norway) Martin Johnsrud Sundby	
	25	15 March 2014	(Sweden) Falun	30 km Skiathlon	(Canada) Alex Harvey	(Norway) Martin Johnsrud Sundby	(Russia) Alexander Legkov	(Norway) Martin Johnsrud Sundby	
	26	16 March 2014	(Sweden) Falun	15 km F Pursuit	(Norway) Martin Johnsrud Sundby	(Sweden) Marcus Hellner	(Norway) Anders Gløersen	(Norway) Martin Johnsrud Sundby	
16	2013–14 World Cup Final (14–16 March 2014)				(Norway) Martin Johnsrud Sundby	(Canada) Alex Harvey	(Russia) Alexander Legkov	(Norway) Martin Johnsrud Sundby	

=== Women ===
C – Classic / F – Freestyle
WC	Stage	Date	Place	Discipline	Winner	Second	Third	Yellow bib	Ref.
	1	29 November 2013	(Finland) Ruka	Sprint C	(Poland) Justyna Kowalczyk	(United States) Kikkan Randall	(Germany) Denise Herrmann	(Poland) Justyna Kowalczyk	
	2	30 November 2013	(Finland) Ruka	5 km C	(Poland) Justyna Kowalczyk	(Norway) Marit Bjørgen	(Norway) Therese Johaug	(Poland) Justyna Kowalczyk	
	3	1 December 2013	(Finland) Ruka	10 km F Pursuit	(Sweden) Charlotte Kalla	(Norway) Therese Johaug	(Norway) Marit Bjørgen	(Poland) Justyna Kowalczyk	
1	4th Nordic Opening Overall (29 November – 1 December 2013)				(Norway) Marit Bjørgen	(Sweden) Charlotte Kalla	(Norway) Therese Johaug	(Norway) Marit Bjørgen	
2	4	7 December 2013	(Norway) Lillehammer	10 km C	(Poland) Justyna Kowalczyk	(Sweden) Charlotte Kalla	(Norway) Marit Bjørgen	(Norway) Marit Bjørgen	
3	5	14 December 2013	(Switzerland) Davos	15 km F	(Norway) Marit Bjørgen	(Norway) Therese Johaug	(Sweden) Charlotte Kalla	(Norway) Marit Bjørgen	
4	6	15 December 2013	(Switzerland) Davos	Sprint F	(Norway) Marit Bjørgen	(United States) Kikkan Randall	(Germany) Denise Herrmann	(Norway) Marit Bjørgen	
5	7	21 December 2013	(Italy) Asiago	Sprint C	(Poland) Justyna Kowalczyk	(Finland) Anne Kyllönen	(Norway) Maiken Caspersen Falla	(Norway) Marit Bjørgen	
	8	28 December 2013	(Germany) Oberhof	3 km F Prologue	(Norway) Marit Bjørgen	(Norway) Astrid Uhrenholdt Jacobsen	(Poland) Sylwia Jaśkowiec	(Norway) Marit Bjørgen	
	9	29 December 2013	(Germany) Oberhof	Sprint F	(Sweden) Hanna Erikson	(Germany) Denise Herrmann	(Norway) Ingvild Flugstad Østberg	(Norway) Marit Bjørgen	
	10	31 December 2013	(Switzerland) Lenzerheide	Sprint F	(Norway) Ingvild Flugstad Østberg	(Norway) Astrid Uhrenholdt Jacobsen	(Germany) Denise Herrmann	(Norway) Marit Bjørgen	
	11	1 January 2014	(Switzerland) Lenzerheide	10 km C Mass Start	(Finland) Kerttu Niskanen	(Norway) Astrid Uhrenholdt Jacobsen	(Norway) Therese Johaug	(Norway) Marit Bjørgen	
	12	3 January 2014	(Italy) Cortina-Toblach	15 km F Pursuit	(Norway) Astrid Uhrenholdt Jacobsen	(Norway) Therese Johaug	(Finland) Anne Kyllönen	(Norway) Marit Bjørgen	
	13	4 January 2014	(Italy) Val di Fiemme	5 km C	(Norway) Therese Johaug	(Norway) Astrid Uhrenholdt Jacobsen	(Finland) Anne Kyllönen	(Norway) Marit Bjørgen	
	13	5 January 2014	(Italy) Val di Fiemme	9 km F Final Climb	(Norway) Therese Johaug	(Norway) Astrid Uhrenholdt Jacobsen	(United States) Elizabeth Stephen	(Norway) Marit Bjørgen	
6	8th Tour de Ski Overall (28 December 2013 – 5 January 2014)				(Norway) Therese Johaug	(Norway) Astrid Uhrenholdt Jacobsen	(Norway) Heidi Weng	(Norway) Therese Johaug	
7	15	11 January 2014	(Czech Republic) Nové Město	Sprint F	(United States) Kikkan Randall	(Switzerland) Laurien van der Graaff	(Norway) Ingvild Flugstad Østberg	(Norway) Therese Johaug	
8	16	18 January 2014	(Poland) Szklarska Poręba	Sprint F	(United States) Kikkan Randall	(Germany) Denise Herrmann	(Slovenia) Vesna Fabjan	(Norway) Therese Johaug	
9	17	19 January 2014	(Poland) Szklarska Poręba	10 km C Mass Start	(Poland) Justyna Kowalczyk	(Russia) Yuliya Chekalyova	(Russia) Yuliya Ivanova	(Norway) Therese Johaug	
10	18	1 February 2014	(Italy) Toblach	10 km C	(Norway) Marit Bjørgen	(Norway) Therese Johaug	(Sweden) Charlotte Kalla	(Norway) Therese Johaug	
11	19	2 February 2014	(Italy) Toblach	Sprint F	(Norway) Marit Bjørgen	(Germany) Denise Herrmann	(Norway) Ingvild Flugstad Østberg	(Norway) Therese Johaug	
2014 Winter Olympics (7–23 February)
12	20	1 March 2014	(Finland) Lahti	Sprint F	(United States) Kikkan Randall	(Slovenia) Katja Višnar	(United States) Sophie Caldwell	(Norway) Therese Johaug	
13	21	2 March 2014	(Finland) Lahti	10 km F	(Norway) Marit Bjørgen	(Sweden) Charlotte Kalla	(Norway) Therese Johaug	(Norway) Therese Johaug	
14	22	5 March 2014	(Norway) Drammen	Sprint C	(Norway) Maiken Caspersen Falla	(Norway) Marit Bjørgen	(Sweden) Stina Nilsson	(Norway) Therese Johaug	
15	23	9 March 2014	(Norway) Oslo	30 km C Mass Start	(Norway) Marit Bjørgen	(Norway) Therese Johaug	(Finland) Kerttu Niskanen	(Norway) Therese Johaug	
	24	14 March 2014	(Sweden) Falun	Sprint C	(Norway) Marit Bjørgen	(Norway) Ingvild Flugstad Østberg	(Sweden) Stina Nilsson	(Norway) Therese Johaug	
	25	15 March 2014	(Sweden) Falun	15 km Skiathlon	(Norway) Therese Johaug	(Norway) Marit Bjørgen	(Finland) Kerttu Niskanen	(Norway) Therese Johaug	
	26	16 March 2014	(Sweden) Falun	10 km F Pursuit	(Norway) Therese Johaug	(Norway) Marit Bjørgen	(Norway) Heidi Weng	(Norway) Therese Johaug	
16	2013–14 World Cup Final (14–16 March 2014)				(Norway) Therese Johaug	(Norway) Marit Bjørgen	(Norway) Heidi Weng	(Norway) Therese Johaug	

=== Men's team ===
WC	Date	Place	Discipline	Winner	Second	Third	Ref.
1	8 December 2013	(Norway) Lillehammer	4 x 7.5 km relay	Russia I Dmitry Yaparov; Alexander Bessmertnykh; Alexander Legkov; Maxim Vylegzhanin	Norway II Eldar Rønning; Chris Jespersen; Sjur Røthe; Finn Hågen Krogh	Norway I Pål Golberg; Didrik Tønseth; Martin Johnsrud Sundby; Petter Northug	
2	22 December 2013	(Italy) Asiago	Team Sprint C	Norway I Eldar Rønning; Ola Vigen Hattestad	Kazakhstan I Nikolay Chebotko; Alexey Poltoranin	Norway II Øystein Pettersen; Eirik Brandsdal	
3	12 January 2014	(Czech Republic) Nové Město	Team Sprint C	Russia I Maxim Vylegzhanin; Nikita Kryukov	Norway I Eldar Rønning; Eirik Brandsdal	Norway II Pål Golberg; Ola Vigen Hattestad	

=== Women's team ===
WC	Date	Place	Discipline	Winner	Second	Third	Ref.
1	8 December 2013	(Norway) Lillehammer	4 x 5 km relay	Norway I Heidi Weng; Therese Johaug; Kristin Størmer Steira; Marit Bjørgen	Finland Aino-Kaisa Saarinen; Anne Kyllönen; Kerttu Niskanen; Krista Lähteenmäki	United States I Kikkan Randall; Sadie Bjornsen; Elizabeth Stephen; Jessie Diggins	
2	22 December 2013	(Italy) Asiago	Team Sprint C	Finland Aino-Kaisa Saarinen; Anne Kyllönen	Norway I Ingvild Flugstad Østberg; Maiken Caspersen Falla	Germany I Katrin Zeller; Denise Herrmann	
3	12 January 2014	(Czech Republic) Nové Město	Team Sprint C	Norway I Maiken Caspersen Falla; Ingvild Flugstad Østberg	Finland Mona-Liisa Malvalehto; Aino-Kaisa Saarinen	Russia II Yevgeniya Shapovalova; Yuliya Ivanova	

== Men's standings ==
=== Overall ===
Rank		Points
1	Martin Johnsrud Sundby (NOR)	1534
2	Alexander Legkov (RUS)	980
3	Alex Harvey (CAN)	766
4	Chris Jespersen (NOR)	739
5	Calle Halfvarsson (SWE)	615
6	Daniel Rickardsson (SWE)	543
7	Petter Northug (NOR)	539
8	Sjur Roethe (NOR)	535
9	Pål Golberg (NOR)	510
10	Maxim Vylegzhanin (RUS)	486

Rank		Points
11	Sergey Ustiugov (RUS)	477
12	Johannes Dürr (AUT)	466
13	Alexey Poltoranin (KAZ)	437
14	Jean-Marc Gaillard (FRA)	389
15	Ilia Chernousov (RUS)	383
16	Ola Vigen Hattestad (NOR)	374
17	Eirik Brandsdal (NOR)	365
18	Marcus Hellner (SWE)	350
19	Josef Wenzl (GER)	306
20	Teodor Peterson (SWE)	297

Rank		Points
21	Lukáš Bauer (CZE)	292
22	Federico Pellegrino (ITA)	288
23	Maurice Manificat (FRA)	287
24	Finn Hågen Krogh (NOR)	285
25	Eldar Rønning (NOR)	283
26	Nikita Kryukov (RUS)	277
27	Hannes Dotzler (GER)	263
28	Matti Heikkinen (FIN)	257
29	Didrik Tønseth (NOR)	255
30	Martin Jakš (CZE)	250

=== Distance ===
Rank		Points
1	Martin Johnsrud Sundby (NOR)	648
2	Alexander Legkov (RUS)	546
3	Daniel Rickardsson (SWE)	389
4	Chris Jespersen (NOR)	354
5	Alex Harvey (CAN)	342
6	Alexey Poltoranin (KAZ)	267
7	Sjur Røthe (NOR)	259
8	Maxim Vylegzhanin (RUS)	229
9	Petter Northug (NOR)	205
10	Lukáš Bauer (CZE)	204

=== Sprint ===
Rank		Points
1	Ola Vigen Hattestad (NOR)	363
2	Eirik Brandsdal (NOR)	355
3	Josef Wenzl (GER)	306
4	Teodor Peterson (SWE)	297
5	Nikita Kryukov (RUS)	277
6	Sergey Ustiugov (RUS)	274
7	Federico Pellegrino (ITA)	272
8	Alex Harvey (CAN)	264
9	Pål Golberg (NOR)	263
10	Alexey Petukhov (RUS)	244

== Women's standings ==
=== Overall ===
Rank		Points
1	Therese Johaug (NOR)	1545
2	Marit Bjørgen (NOR)	1498
3	Astrid Uhrenholdt Jacobsen (NOR)	974
4	Heidi Weng (NOR)	951
5	Kerttu Niskanen (FIN)	883
6	Kikkan Randall (USA)	841
7	Charlotte Kalla (SWE)	783
8	Krista Lähteenmäki (FIN)	726
9	Denise Herrmann (GER)	704
10	Ingvild Flugstad Østberg (NOR)	684

Rank		Points
11	Anne Kyllönen (FIN)	641
12	Justyna Kowalczyk (POL)	618
13	Aino-Kaisa Saarinen (FIN)	570
14	Eva Vrabcová-Nývltová (CZE)	477
15	Yuliya Chekalyova (RUS)	442
16	Maiken Caspersen Falla (NOR)	433
17	Elizabeth Stephen (USA)	395
18	Masako Ishida (JPN)	383
19	Kristin Størmer Steira (NOR)	379
20	Jessie Diggins (USA)	320

Rank		Points
21	Emma Wikén (SWE)	298
22	Katja Višnar (SLO)	284
23	Sophie Caldwell (USA)	280
24	Laurien van der Graaff (SUI)	275
25	Katrin Zeller (GER)	273
26	Sara Lindborg (SWE)	255
27	Gaia Vuerich (ITA)	234
28	Aurore Jean (FRA)	227
29	Hanna Erikson (SWE)	218
30	Yuliya Ivanova (RUS)	208

=== Distance ===
Rank		Points
1	Therese Johaug (NOR)	750
2	Marit Bjørgen (NOR)	705
3	Kerttu Niskanen (FIN)	502
4	Charlotte Kalla (SWE)	473
5	Heidi Weng (NOR)	448
6	Astrid Uhrenholdt Jacobsen (NOR)	443
7	Justyna Kowalczyk (POL)	348
8	Aino-Kaisa Saarinen (FIN)	331
9	Krista Lähteenmäki (FIN)	300
10	Yuliya Chekalyova (RUS)	298

=== Sprint ===
Rank		Points
1	Kikkan Randall (USA)	558
2	Denise Herrmann (GER)	496
3	Marit Bjørgen (NOR)	433
4	Ingvild Flugstad Østberg (NOR)	426
5	Maiken Caspersen Falla (NOR)	320
6	Katja Višnar (SLO)	280
7	Laurien van der Graaff (SUI)	275
8	Sophie Caldwell (USA)	237
9	Gaia Vuerich (ITA)	234
10	Anne Kyllönen (FIN)	197

== Nations Cup ==
=== Overall ===
Rank		Points
1	Norway	14435
2	Russia	6310
3	Sweden	5532
4	Finland	5057
5	Germany	3623
6	United States	3092
7	France	2015
8	Czech Republic	1450
9	Italy	1393
10	Canada	1364

=== Men ===
Rank		Points
1	Norway	6916
2	Russia	4682
3	Sweden	2790
4	Germany	1554
5	Finland	1495
6	France	1356
7	Canada	1236
8	Czech Republic	877
9	Italia	843
10	Switzerland	738

=== Women ===
Rank		Points
1	Norway	7519
2	Finland	3562
3	Sweden	2742
4	United States	2421
5	Germany	2069
6	Russia	1628
7	Poland	949
8	Slovenia	771
9	France	659
10	Czech Republic	573

== Points distribution ==
The table shows the number of points won in the 2013–14 Cross-Country Skiing World Cup for men and women.

Place	1	2	3	4	5	6	7	8	9	10	11	12	13	14	15	16	17	18	19	20	21	22	23	24	25	26	27	28	29	30
Individual	100	80	60	50	45	40	36	32	29	26	24	22	20	18	16	15	14	13	12	11	10	9	8	7	6	5	4	3	2	1
Team Sprint	100	80	60	50	45	40	36	32	29	26	24	22	20	18	16	15	14	13	12	11	10	9	8	7	6	5	4	3	2	1
Nordic Opening	200	160	120	100	90	80	72	64	58	52	48	44	40	36	32	30	28	26	24	22	20	18	16	14	12	10	8	6	4	2
World Cup Final	200	160	120	100	90	80	72	64	58	52	48	44	40	36	32	30	28	26	24	22	20	18	16	14	12	10	8	6	4	2
Relay	200	160	120	100	90	80	72	64	58	52	48	44	40	36	32	30	28	26	24	22	20	18	16	14	12	10	8	6	4	2
Tour de Ski	400	320	240	200	180	160	144	128	116	104	96	88	80	72	64	60	56	52	48	44	40	36	32	28	24	20	16	12	8	4
Stage Nordic Opening	50	46	43	40	37	34	32	30	28	26	24	22	20	18	16	15	14	13	12	11	10	9	8	7	6	5	4	3	2	1
Stage Tour de Ski	50	46	43	40	37	34	32	30	28	26	24	22	20	18	16	15	14	13	12	11	10	9	8	7	6	5	4	3	2	1
Stage World Cup Final	50	46	43	40	37	34	32	30	28	26	24	22	20	18	16	15	14	13	12	11	10	9	8	7	6	5	4	3	2	1
Bonus points	15	12	10	8	6	5	4	3	2	1

All results in all distance races and sprint races counts towards the overall World Cup totals.

All distance races, included individual stages in Tour de Ski and in World Cup Final (which counts as 50% of a normal race), count towards the distance standings. All sprint races, including the sprint races during the Tour de Ski and the first race of the World Cup final (which counts as 50% of a normal race), count towards the sprint standings.

In mass start races bonus points are awarded to the first 10 at each bonus station.

The Nations Cup ranking is calculated by adding each country's individual competitors' scores and scores from team events. Relay events count double, with only one team counting towards the total, while in team sprint events two teams contribute towards the total, with the usual World Cup points (100 to winning team, etc.) awarded.

== Achievements ==
Only individual events.

First World Cup career victory

Men

- Noah Hoffman (USA), 24, in his 6th season – the WC 3 (15 km F Handicap Start) in Ruka; also first podium
- Pål Golberg (NOR), 23, in his 5th season – the WC 4 (15 km C) in Lillehammer; first podium was 2008–09 WC 27 (Sprint C) in Lahti
- Nikita Kryukov (RUS), 28, in his 8th season – the WC 7 (Sprint C) in Asiago; first podium was 2009–10 WC 2 (Sprint C) in Ruka
- Calle Halfvarsson (SWE), 24, in his 6th season – the WC 9 (Sprint F) in Oberhof; also first podium
- Simeon Hamilton (USA), 26, in his 5th season – the WC 10 (Sprint F) in Lenzerheide; also first podium
- Chris Jespersen (NOR), 30, in his 11th season – the WC 14 (9 km F Final Climb) in Val di Fiemme; first podium was 2013-14 WC 2 (30 km F) in Davos
- Sergey Ustiugov (RUS), 21, in his 2nd season – the WC 15 (Sprint F) in Nové Město; first podium was 2013–14 WC 4 (Sprint F) in Davos

Women

- Hanna Erikson (SWE), 23, in her 6th season – the WC 9 (Sprint F) in Oberhof; first podium was 2010–11 WC 20 (Sprint C) in Otepää
- Ingvild Flugstad Østberg (NOR), 23, in her 6th season – the WC 10 (Sprint F) in Lenzerheide; first podium was 2012–13 WC 11 (Sprint F) in Val Müstair
- Kerttu Niskanen (FIN), 25, in her 7th season – the WC 11 (10 km Mass Start) in Lenzerheide; first podium was 2012–13 WC 26 (Sprint C) in Stockholm

First World Cup podium

Men

- Dmitry Yaparov (RUS), 27, in his 4th season – no. 3 in the WC 1 (10 km C) in Ruka
- Didrik Tønseth (NOR), 22, in his 3rd season – no. 3 in the WC 2 (15 km C) in Lillehammer
- Chris Jespersen (NOR), 30, in his 10th season – no. 2 in the WC 3 (30 km F) in Davos
- Martti Jylhä (FIN), 26, in his 9th season – no. 2 in the WC 4 (Sprint F) in Davos
- Sergey Ustiugov (RUS), 21, in his 2nd season – no. 3 in the WC 4 (Sprint F) in Davos
- Gianluca Cologna (SUI), 23, in his 4th season – no. 3 in the WC 5 (Sprint C) in Asiago
- Baptiste Gros (FRA), 23, in his 4th season – no. 3 in the WC 8 (Sprint F) in Szklarska Poręba
- Hannes Dotzler (GER), 23, in his 9th season – no. 2 in the WC 11 (15 km C Mass Start) in Lenzerheide
- Stanislav Volzhentsev (RUS), 28, in his 7th season – no. 3 in the WC 11 (15 km C Mass Start) in Lenzerheide
- Evgeniy Belov (RUS), 23, in his 4th season – no. 2 in the WC 9 (15 km C Mass Start) in Szklarska Poręba
- Maicol Rastelli (ITA), 22, in his 2nd season – no. 3 in the WC 14 (Sprint C) in Drammen

Women

- Denise Herrmann (GER), 24, in her 5th season – no. 3 in the WC 4 (Sprint F) in Davos
- Sylwia Jaśkowiec (POL), 27, in her 10th season – no. 3 in the WC 8 (3 km F Prologue) in Oberhof
- Sophie Caldwell (USA), 23, in her 2nd season – no. 3 in the WC 12 (Sprint F) in Lahti
- Stina Nilsson (SWE), 20, in her 3rd season – no. 3 in the WC 14 (Sprint C) in Drammen
- Kerttu Niskanen (FIN), 25, in her 7th season – no. 3 in the WC 15 (30 km C Mass Start) in Oslo

Victories in this World Cup (all-time number of victories as of 2013/14 season in parentheses)

Men

- Martin Johnsrud Sundby (NOR), 6 (8) first places
- Alex Harvey (CAN), 3 (4) first place
- Ola Vigen Hattestad (NOR), 2 (13) first places
- Pål Golberg (NOR), 2 (2) first places
- Petter Northug (NOR), 1 (34) first places
- Lukáš Bauer (CZE), 1 (18) first places
- Alexey Poltoranin (KAZ), 1 (7) first places
- Alexander Legkov (RUS), 1 (6) first places
- Eirik Brandsdal (NOR), 1 (5) first places
- Teodor Peterson (SWE), 1 (4) first places
- Anders Gløersen (NOR), 1 (4) first places
- Maurice Manificat (FRA), 1 (3) first places
- Maxim Vylegzhanin (RUS), 1 (5) first places
- Daniel Rickardsson (SWE), 1 (3) first places
- Noah Hoffman (USA), 1 (1) first places
- Calle Halfvarsson (SWE), 1 (1) first places
- Simeon Hamilton (USA), 1 (1) first places
- Nikita Kryukov (RUS), 1 (1) first place
- Chris Jespersen (NOR), 1 (1) first place
- Sergey Ustiugov (RUS), 1 (1) first place

Women

- Marit Bjørgen (NOR), 9 (87) first places
- Therese Johaug (NOR), 6 (19) first places
- Justyna Kowalczyk (POL), 5 (49) first places
- Kikkan Randall (USA), 3 (13) first places
- Charlotte Kalla (SWE), 1 (8) first places
- Astrid Uhrenholdt Jacobsen (NOR), 1 (4) first places
- Maiken Caspersen Falla (NOR), 1 (3) first places
- Hanna Erikson (SWE), 1 (1) first places
- Ingvild Flugstad Østberg (NOR), 1 (1) first places
- Kerttu Niskanen (FIN), 1 (1) first places

== Retirements ==
Following are notable cross-country skiers who announced their retirement after the 2013–14 season:

Men

- Tobias Angerer (GER)
- Roddy Darragon (FRA)
- Christoph Eigenmann (SUI)
- Jens Filbrich (GER)
- Nobu Naruse (JPN)
- Axel Teichmann (GER)

Women

- Chandra Crawford (CAN)
- Bettina Gruber (SUI)
- Agnieszka Szymańczak (POL)
- Katrin Zeller (GER)
