= FIS Nordic World Ski Championships 2011 – Men's 4 × 10 kilometre relay =

Men's 4 × 10 kilometre relay at the FIS Nordic World Ski Championships 2011
- Date: 14 March 2011
- Competitors: 68 from 17 nations
- Winning time: 1:40:10.2

Medalists
gold medal	Martin Johnsrud Sundby; Eldar Rønning; Tord Asle Gjerdalen; Petter Northug	Norway
silver medal	Daniel Rickardsson; Johan Olsson; Anders Södergren; Marcus Hellner	Sweden
bronze medal	Jens Filbrich; Axel Teichmann; Franz Göring; Tobias Angerer	Germany

The Men's 4 x 10 kilometre relay was held on 4 March 2011 at 13:00 CET The defending world champions were the Norwegian team of Eldar Rønning, Odd-Bjørn Hjelmeset, Tore Ruud Hofstad and Petter Northug while the defending Olympic champions were the Swedish team of Daniel Rickardsson, Johan Olsson, Anders Södergren, and Hellner.

== Results ==
Rank	Bib	Country	Athlete	Time	Deficit
1st place, gold medalist(s)	2	Norway	Martin Johnsrud Sundby; Eldar Rønning; Tord Asle Gjerdalen; Petter Northug	1:40:10.2; 26:05.7; 25:44.7; 24:22.4; 23:57.4	
2nd place, silver medalist(s)	1	Sweden	Daniel Rickardsson; Johan Olsson; Anders Södergren; Marcus Hellner	1:40:11.5; 25:43.5; 26:06.3; 24:22.2; 23:59.5	+1.3
3rd place, bronze medalist(s)	6	Germany	Jens Filbrich; Axel Teichmann; Franz Göring; Tobias Angerer	1:40:15.9; 26:13.7; 26:03.7; 23:56.5; 24:02.0	+5.7
4	5	Finland	Ville Nousiainen; Sami Jauhojärvi; Juha Lallukka; Matti Heikkinen	1:40:25.2; 26:38.6; 25:35.2; 23:47.4; 24:24.0	+15.0
5	9	Italy	Valerio Checchi; Giorgio Di Centa; Roland Clara; Pietro Piller Cottrer	1:40:41.5; 26:26.7; 25:50.0; 23:48.2; 24:36.6	+31.3
6	17	Japan	Kouhei Shimizu; Keishin Yoshida; Masaya Kimura; Nobu Naruse	1:41:49.4; 26:26.0; 25:51.1; 24:54.7; 24:37.6	+1:39.2
7	8	Russia	Maxim Vylegzhanin; Stanislav Volzhentsev; Alexander Legkov; Ilia Chernousov	1:42:46.3; 25:43.0; 26:26.8; 25:41.1; 24:55.4	+2:36.1
8	3	Czech Republic	Martin Jakš; Lukáš Bauer; Jiří Magál; Martin Koukal	1:43:08.2; 27:03.9; 26:08.0; 25:12.7; 24:43.6	+2:58.0
9	10	Switzerland	Toni Livers; Dario Cologna; Remo Fischer; Curdin Perl	1:43:20.9; 27:06.9; 26:05.5; 25:12.4; 24:56.1	+3:10.7
10	13	Estonia	Jaak Mae; Algo Kärp; Karel Tammjärv; Aivar Rehemaa	1:43:21.3; 26:11.6; 26:49.6; 25:19.4; 25:00.7	+3:11.1
11	4	France	Jean-Marc Gaillard; Maurice Manificat; Vincent Vittoz; Robin Duvillard	1:44:59.3; 26:48.0; 27:10.9; 25:04.9; 25:55.5	+4:49.1
12	7	Canada	Stefan Kuhn; Len Väljas; Ivan Babikov; George Grey	1:45:12.1; 27:50.8; 27:27.2; 24:40.5; 25:13.6	+5:01.9
13	11	Kazakhstan	Sergey Cherepanov; Alexey Poltoranin; Gennadiy Matviyenko; Yevgeniy Velichko	1:45:20.9; 26:11.8; 26:27.0; 26:59.2; 25:42.9	+5:10.7
14	12	United States	Andrew Newell; Kris Freeman; Noah Hoffman; Tad Elliot	1:47:05.0; 28:16.7; 27:07.8; 25:24.5; 26:16.0	+6:54.8
15	14	United Kingdom	Andrew Musgrave; Simon James Platt; Callum Smith; Andrew Young	LAP; 28:17.5; 31:11.6; 28:06.8	
16	15	Australia	Ben Sim; Ewan Watson; Callum Watson; Mark van der Ploeg	LAP; 29:17.3; 30:44.0	
17	16	Denmark	Asger Fischer Moelgaard; Kristian Wulff; Jens Hulgaard; Lasse Hulgaard	LAP; 30:47.7; 32:25.4	

== See also ==
- 2011 IPC Biathlon and Cross-Country Skiing World Championships – Men's relay
