= US SuperTour =

Series of cross-country skiing event in the United States

- Genre: Cross-country skiing
- Date: Northern wintertime season
- Begins: November
- Ends: March
- Location: United States
- Inaugurated: 2001
- Organiser: International Ski Federation
- Website: usskiandsnowboard.org/supertour

The US SuperTour is a series of cross-country skiing events arranged by the International Ski Federation (FIS). It is one of the nine FIS Cross-Country Continental Cups, a second-level competition ranked below the Cross-Country World Cup. The US SuperTour is open for competitors from all nations, but are mainly a competition for skiers from the United States.

The US Super Tour has been held since the 2001 season, and has been a part of the Cross-Country Continental Cup since 2004.

== World Cup qualification ==
In the end of certain periods, the overall leaders for both genders receive a place in the World Cup in the following period. The overall winners of the season receive a place in the World Cup in the beginning of the following season.

== Overall winners ==
=== Men ===
Season	Winner	Second	Third
2006–07	(United States) Lars Flora (1)	(United States) Kris Freeman	(United States) Garrott Kuzzy
2007–08	(United States) Garrott Kuzzy	(United States) Lars Flora	(United States) Leif Orin Zimmermann
2008–09	(United States) Lars Flora (2)	(United States) Leif Orin Zimmermann	(United States) Bryan Cook
2009–10	(United States) Chris Cook	(United States) Brian Gregg	(United States) Bryan Cook
2010–11	(United States) Lars Flora (3)	(United States) Michael Sinnott	(United States) Brian Gregg
2011–12	(United States) Sylvan Ellefson	(United States) Karl Nygren	(United States) Brian Gregg
2012–13	(United States) Michael Sinnott	(United States) Erik Bjornsen	(United States) Torin Koos
2013–14	(United States) Reese Hanneman	(United States) Erik Bjornsen	(United States) Brian Gregg
2014–15	(United States) Kris Freeman	(United States) Alexander Treinen	(United States) Dakota Blackhorse-von Jess
2015–16	(United States) Eric Packer	(United States) David Norris	(United States) Kris Freeman
2016–17	(United States) Scott Patterson	(United States) Patrick Caldwell	(United States) Brian Gregg
2017–18	(United States) David Norris	(United States) Kevin Bolger	(United States) Kris Freeman
2018–19	(United States) Kyle Bratrud	(United States) Benjamin Saxton	(United States) David Norris
2019–20	(United States) Gus Schumacher	(United States) Benjamin Lustgarten	(United States) Adam Martin
2020–21	Not held due to the coronavirus pandemic		

=== Women ===
Season	Winner	Second	Third
2006–07	(United States) Caitlin Gregg (1)	(United States) Laura Valaas	(United States) Kate Whitcomb
2007–08	(Sweden) Kristina Strandberg (1)	(Switzerland) Karin Camenisch	(United States) Laura Valaas
2008–09	(Sweden) Kristina Strandberg (2)	(United States) Lindsey Dehlin	(United States) Elizabeth Stephen
2009–10	(United States) Rebecca Dussault	(United States) Kikkan Randall	(United States) Holly Brooks
2010–11	(United States) Holly Brooks	(United States) Kate Fitzgerald	(United States) Morgan Smyth
2011–12	(United States) Jessie Diggins	(United States) Jennie Bender	(United States) Caitlin Gregg
2012–13	(United States) Rosie Brennan (1)	(United States) Sadie Bjornsen	(United States) Kate Fitzgerald
2013–14	(United States) Caitlin Gregg (2)	(United States) Rosie Brennan	(United States) Caitlin Patterson
2014–15	(United States) Rosie Brennan (2)	(United States) Chelsea Holmes	(United States) Becca Rorabaugh
2015–16	(United States) Caitlin Patterson	(United States) Anne Hart	(United States) Chelsea Holmes
2016–17	(United States) Chelsea Holmes	(United States) Caitlin Patterson	(United States) Kaitlynn Miller
2017–18	(United States) Kaitlynn Miller	(United States) Caitlin Patterson	(United States) Rosie Frankowski
2018–19	(United States) Julia Kern	(United States) Kaitlynn Miller	(Australia) Jessica Yeaton
2019–20	(United States) Kaitlynn Miller (2)	(United States) Erika Flowers	(United States) Alayna Sonnesyn
2020–21	Not held due to the coronavirus pandemic		
