= 2017–18 US SuperTour =

Discipline	Men	Women
Overall	(United States) David Norris	(United States) Kaitlynn Miller

Competition
Locations	3 venues	3 venues
Individual	9 events	9 events

The 2017–18 US SuperTour was a season of the US SuperTour, a Continental Cup season in cross-country skiing for men and women. The season began on 2 December 2017 in West Yellowstone, Montana and concluded with on 28 March 2018 in Craftsbury, Vermont.

== Calendar ==
=== Men ===
Key: C – Classic / F – Freestyle
Period	Race	Date	Place	Discipline	Winner	Second	Third	Ref.
I	1	2 December 2017	(United States) Rendezvous Ski Trails	Sprint F	(United States) Nick Michaud	(United States) Benjamin Lustgarten	(United States) Reese Hanneman	
I	2	3 December 2017	(United States) Rendezvous Ski Trails	15 km C Mass Start	(United States) Brian Gregg	(United States) David Norris	(United States) Benjamin Lustgarten	
II	3	26 January 2018	(United States) Craftsbury, VT	Sprint C	(United States) Forrest Mahlen	(United States) Benjamin Saxton	(United States) Kevin Bolger	
II	4	28 January 2018	(United States) Craftsbury, VT	10 km F	(United States) David Norris	(Canada) Andy Shields	(United States) Kevin Bolger	
III	5	15 February 2018	(United States) Ishpeming, MI	Sprint F	(United States) Kevin Bolger	(United States) John Hegman	(United States) David Norris	
III	6	17 February 2018	(United States) Ishpeming, MI	20 km F Mass Start	(United States) David Norris	(United States) Kevin Bolger	(United States) Brian Gregg	
III	7	18 February 2018	(United States) Ishpeming, MI	10 km C	(United States) David Norris	(United States) Benjamin Lustgarten	(United States) Kris Freeman	
IV	8	23 March 2018	(United States) Craftsbury, VT	Sprint C	(United States) Andrew Newell	(United States) Benjamin Saxton	(United States) Erik Bjornsen	
IV	9	24 March 2018	(United States) Craftsbury, VT	15 km F Mass Start	(United States) Erik Bjornsen	(United States) Simeon Hamilton	(United States) Tad Elliott	

=== Women ===
Key: C – Classic / F – Freestyle
Period	Race	Date	Place	Discipline	Winner	Second	Third	Ref.
I	1	2 December 2017	(United States) Rendezvous Ski Trails	Sprint F	(United States) Anne Hartt	(United States) Erika Flowers	(United States) Kelsey Phinney	
I	2	3 December 2017	(United States) Rendezvous Ski Trails	10 km C Mass Start	(Sweden) Hedda Bångman	(United States) Kaitlynn Miller	(United States) Caitlin Patterson	
II	3	26 January 2018	(United States) Craftsbury, VT	Sprint C	(United States) Kaitlynn Miller	(United States) Kelsey Phinney	(United States) Felicia Gesior	
II	4	28 January 2018	(United States) Craftsbury, VT	5 km F	(United States) Becca Rorabaugh	(United States) Rosie Frankowski	(United States) Erika Flowers	
III	5	15 February 2018	(United States) Ishpeming, MI	Sprint F	(Norway) Anikken Gjerde Alnæs	(United States) Erika Flowers	(United States) Kaitlynn Miller	
III	6	17 February 2018	(United States) Ishpeming, MI	15 km F Mass Start	(United States) Chelsea Holmes	(United States) Caitlin Gregg	(United States) Erika Flowers	
III	7	18 February 2018	(United States) Ishpeming, MI	5 km C	(United States) Kaitlynn Miller	(United States) Elizabeth Guiney	(United States) Chelsea Holmes	
IV	8	23 March 2018	(United States) Craftsbury, VT	Sprint C	(United States) Jessie Diggins	(United States) Sophie Caldwell	(United States) Ida Sargent	
IV	9	24 March 2018	(United States) Craftsbury, VT	10 km F Mass Start	(United States) Jessie Diggins	(United States) Sadie Bjornsen	(United States) Kikkan Randall	

== Overall standings ==
=== Men's overall standings ===
Rank		Points
1	(United States) David Norris	351
2	(United States) Kevin Bolger	336
3	(United States) Kris Freeman	273
4	(United States) Eric Packer	260
5	(United States) John Hegman	248
6	(United States) Tad Elliott	236
7	(United States) Martin Adam	231
8	(United States) Benjamin Saxton	224
9	(United States) Brian Gregg	214
10	(United States) Benjamin Lustgarten	210

=== Women's overall standings ===
Rank		Points
1	(United States) Kaitlynn Miller	433
2	(United States) Caitlin Patterson	399
3	(United States) Rosie Frankowski	342
4	(United States) Erika Flowers	322
5	(United States) Becca Rorabaugh	294
6	(United States) Elizabeth Guiney	269
7	(United States) Chelsea Holmes	196
8	(United States) Felicia Gesior	187
9	(United States) Jessie Diggins	180
10	(United States) Kelsey Phinney	172
