= 2017–18 FIS Cross-Country Continental Cup =

Discipline	Men	Women
Alpen Cup	(France) Jean Tiberghien	(Germany) Antonia Fräbel
Australia/New Zealand Cup	(Australia) Phillip Bellingham	(Australia) Barbara Jezeršek
Balkan Cup	(Bulgaria) Nikolay Vijaczev	(Bulgaria) Nancy Okoro
Eastern Europe Cup	(Russia) Stanislav Volzhentsev	(Russia) Polina Nekrasova
Far East Cup	(Japan) Hiroyuki Miyazawa	(Japan) Miki Kodama
Nor-Am Cup	(Canada) Andy Shields	(United States) Caitlin Gregg
Scandinavian Cup	(Norway) Martin Løwstrøm Nyenget	(Norway) Tiril Udnes Weng
Slavic Cup	(Slovakia) Peter Mlynár	(Poland) Eliza Rucka
US SuperTour	(United States) David Norris	(United States) Kaitlynn Miller

Competition

The 2017–18 FIS Cross-Country Continental Cup (COC) was a season of the FIS Cross-Country Continental Cup, a series of second-level cross-country skiing competitions arranged by the International Ski Federation (FIS).

The 2017–18 Continental Cup contained nine different series of geographically restricted competitions; five in Europe, two in North America and one each from Asia and Oceania.

== Winners ==
The overall winners from the 2017–18 season's Continental Cups were rewarded a right to start in the first period in the following 2018–19 World Cup season.

Cup	Abbr.	Men			Women		
Cup	Abbr.	Winner	Second	Third	Winner	Second	Third
Alpen Cup (or OPA Cup)	OPA	(France) Jean Tiberghien	(Switzerland) Beda Klee	(France) Valentin Chauvin	(Germany) Antonia Fräbel	(Italy) Sara Pellgrini	(Germany) Julia Belger
Australia/New Zealand Cup	ANC	(Australia) Phillip Bellingham	(Australia) Callum Watson	(Australia) Paul Kovacs	(Australia) Barbara Jezeršek	(Australia) Katerina Paul	(Australia) Aimee Watson
Balkan Cup	BC	(Bulgaria) Nikolay Vijaczev	(Bulgaria) Martin Penchev	(Bulgaria) Yordan Chuchuganov	(Bulgaria) Nancy Okoro	(Serbia) Anja Ilić	(Greece) Maria Danu
Eastern Europe Cup	EEC	(Russia) Stanislav Volzhentsev	(Russia) Ermil Vokuev	(Russia) Andrey Parfenov	(Russia) Polina Nekrasova	(Russia) Larisa Ryasina	(Russia) Mariya Davydenkova
Far East Cup	FEC	(Japan) Hiroyuki Miyazawa	(Japan) Naoto Baba	(Japan) Keishin Yoshida	(Japan) Miki Kodama	(Japan) Yuki Kobayashi	(Japan) Masako Ishida
Nor-Am Cup	NAC	(Canada) Andy Shields	(Canada) Jesse Cockney	(Canada) Evan Palmer-Charrette	(United States) Caitlin Gregg	(Canada) Olivia Bouffard-Nesbitt	(Canada) Annika Hicks
Scandinavian Cup	SCAN	(Norway) Martin Løwstrøm Nyenget	(Norway) Eirik Sverdrup Augdal	(Norway) Daniel Stock	(Norway) Tiril Udnes Weng	(Norway) Lotta Udnes Weng	(Sweden) Jonna Sundling
Slavic Cup	SC	(Slovakia) Peter Mlynár	(Poland) Mateusz Haratyk	(Slovakia) Andrej Segeč	(Poland) Eliza Rucka	(Poland) Urszula Łętocha	(Slovakia) Alena Procházková
US SuperTour	UST	(United States) David Norris	(United States) Kevin Bolger	(United States) Kris Freeman	(United States) Kaitlynn Miller	(United States) Caitlin Patterson	(United States) Rosie Frankowski
