= 2018–19 US SuperTour =

| Discipline | Men | Women |
| Overall | (United States) Kyle Bratrud | (United States) Julia Kern |

Competition
| Locations | 4 venues | 4 venues |
| Individual | 10 events | 10 events |

The 2018–19 US SuperTour was a season of the US SuperTour, a Continental Cup season in cross-country skiing for men and women. The season began on 1 December 2018 in West Yellowstone, Montana and concluded with on 30 March 2019 in Presque Isle, Maine.

== Calendar ==
=== Men ===
Key: C – Classic / F – Freestyle
| Period | Race | Date | Place | Discipline | Winner | Second | Third | Ref. |
|---|---|---|---|---|---|---|---|---|
| I | 1 | 1 December 2018 | (United States) Rendezvous Ski Trails | Sprint F | (United States) Andrew Newell | (United States) Benjamin Lustgarten | (Canada) Ricardo Izquierdo-Bernier | |
| I | 2 | 2 December 2018 | (United States) Rendezvous Ski Trails | 15 km F | (United States) Benjamin Lustgarten | (United States) Kyle Bratrud | (United States) Akeo Maifeld-Carucci | |
| II | 3 | 25 January 2019 | (United States) Mt. Van Hoevenberg | 10 km F | (United States) Kyle Bratrud | (United States) Akeo Maifield-Carucci | (Canada) Alexis Dumas | |
| II | 4 | 26 January 2019 | (United States) Mt. Van Hoevenberg | Sprint C | (Canada) Antoine Briand | (Canada) Dominique Moncion-Groulx | (United States) Benjamin Saxton | |
| II | 5 | 27 January 2019 | (United States) Mt. Van Hoevenberg | 15 km C Mass Start | (United States) Kyle Bratrud | (United States) Adam Martin | (Canada) Andy Shields | |
| III | 6 | 15 February 2019 | (United States) Theodore Wirth Park | Sprint F | (Canada) Antoine Briand | (United States) Tyler Kornfield | (United States) Forrest Mahlen | |
| III | 7 | 16 February 2019 | (United States) Theodore Wirth Park | 20 km C Mass Start | (United States) Zak Ketterson | (United States) Benjamin Lustgarten | (Norway) Mathias Aas Rolid | |
| III | 8 | 17 February 2019 | (United States) Theodore Wirth Park | 10 km F | (United States) Matthew Edward Liebsch | (United States) Zak Ketterson | (United States) Akeo Maifield-Carucci | |
| IV | 9 | 29 March 2019 | (United States) Presque Isle, ME | Sprint F | (United States) Simeon Hamilton | (United States) Erik Bjornsen | (Canada) Graham Ritchie | |
| IV | 10 | 30 March 2019 | (United States) Presque Isle, ME | 15 km C Mass Start | (United States) Erik Bjornsen | (United States) Simeon Hamilton | (United States) Gus Schumacher | |

=== Women ===
Key: C – Classic / F – Freestyle
| Period | Race | Date | Place | Discipline | Winner | Second | Third | Ref. |
|---|---|---|---|---|---|---|---|---|
| I | 1 | 1 December 2018 | (United States) Rendezvous Ski Trails | Sprint F | (United States) Julia Kern | (United States) Rosie Frankowski | (United States) Hannah Halvorsen | |
| I | 2 | 2 December 2018 | (United States) Rendezvous Ski Trails | 10 km F | (United States) Rosie Frankowski | (Norway) Guro Jordheim | (United States) Becca Rorabaugh | |
| II | 3 | 25 January 2019 | (United States) Mt. Van Hoevenberg | 5 km F | (Australia) Jessica Yeaton | (United States) Sophie Caldwell | (United States) Katharine Ogden | |
| II | 4 | 26 January 2019 | (United States) Mt. Van Hoevenberg | Sprint C | (United States) Sophie Caldwell | (Australia) Jessica Yeaton | (United States) Kelsey Phinney | |
| II | 5 | 27 January 2019 | (United States) Mt. Van Hoevenberg | 10 km C Mass Start | (United States) Kaitlynn Miller | (Australia) Jessica Yeaton | (United States) Katharine Ogden | |
| III | 6 | 15 February 2019 | (United States) Theodore Wirth Park | Sprint F | (United States) Alayna Sonnesyn | (United States) Becca Rorabaugh | (United States) Erika Flowers | |
| III | 7 | 16 February 2019 | (United States) Theodore Wirth Park | 15 km C Mass Start | (United States) Kaitlynn Miller | (United States) Alayna Sonnesyn | (United States) Elizabeth Guiney | |
| III | 8 | 17 February 2019 | (United States) Theodore Wirth Park | 5 km F | (United States) Nicole Schneider | (United States) Alayna Sonnesyn | (United States) Abigail Jarzin | |
| IV | 9 | 29 March 2019 | (United States) Presque Isle, ME | Sprint F | (United States) Sadie Bjornsen | (United States) Ida Sargent | (United States) Julia Kern | |
| IV | 10 | 30 March 2019 | (United States) Presque Isle, ME | 10 km C Mass Start | (United States) Sadie Bjornsen | (United States) Rosie Brennan | (Canada) Dahria Beatty | |

== Overall standings ==
=== Men's overall standings ===
| Rank | | Points |
|---|---|---|
| 1 | (United States) Kyle Bratrud | 307 |
| 2 | (United States) Benjamin Saxton | 235 |
| 3 | (United States) David Norris | 222 |
| 4 | (United States) Benjamin Lustgarten | 221 |
| 5 | (United States) Akeo Maifeld-Carucci | 214 |
| 6 | (United States) Peter Holmes | 192 |
| 7 | (United States) Forrest Mahlen | 187 |
| 8 | (United States) Gus Schumacher | 182 |
| 9 | (United States) Zak Ketterson | 173 |
| 10 | (United States) Erik Bjornsen | 170 |

=== Women's overall standings ===
| Rank | | Points |
|---|---|---|
| 1 | (United States) Julia Kern | 343 |
| 2 | (United States) Kaitlynn Miller | 302 |
| 3 | (Australia) Jessica Yeaton | 280 |
| 4 | (United States) Caitlin Patterson | 272 |
| 5 | (United States) Alayna Sonnesyn | 249 |
| 6 | (United States) Rosie Frankowski | 225 |
| 7 | (United States) Hannah Halvorsen | 210 |
| 8 | (United States) Becca Rorabaugh | 203 |
| 9 | (United States) Hailey Swirbul | 202 |
| 10 | (United States) Ida Sargent | 184 |
