= FIS Nordic World Ski Championships 2015 – Men's 15 kilometre freestyle =

Men's 15 kilometre freestyle at the FIS Nordic World Ski Championships 2015
- Date: 25 February 2015
- Competitors: 86 from 35 nations
- Winning time: 35:01.6

Medalists
gold medal	Johan Olsson	Sweden
silver medal	Maurice Manificat	France
bronze medal	Anders Gløersen	Norway

The Men's 15 kilometre freestyle event of the FIS Nordic World Ski Championships 2015 was held on 25 February 2015. A 10 km qualification race was held on 18 February.

== Results ==
=== Race ===
The race was started at 13:30.

Rank	Bib	Athlete	Country	Time	Deficit
1st place, gold medalist(s)	17	Johan Olsson	Sweden	35:01.6	
2nd place, silver medalist(s)	63	Maurice Manificat	France	35:19.4	+17.8
3rd place, bronze medalist(s)	43	Anders Gløersen	Norway	35:20.8	+19.2
4	55	Marcus Hellner	Sweden	35:41.4	+39.8
5	53	Finn Hågen Krogh	Norway	35:49.2	+47.6
6	25	Bernhard Tritscher	Austria	35:55.0	+53.4
7	21	Lukáš Bauer	Czech Republic	35:56.3	+54.7
8	61	Chris Jespersen	Norway	35:58.8	+57.2
9	45	Sjur Røthe	Norway	36:02.8	+1:01.2
10	69	Evgeniy Belov	Russia	36:06.3	+1:04.7
11	39	Robin Duvillard	France	36:10.2	+1:08.6
12	3	Michail Semenov	Belarus	36:12.3	+1:10.7
13	57	Daniel Rickardsson	Sweden	36:13.8	+1:12.2
14	49	Alexander Legkov	Russia	36:20.7	+1:19.1
15	41	Toni Livers	Switzerland	36:21.5	+1:19.9
16	35	Andrew Musgrave	Great Britain	36:27.2	+1:25.4
17	37	Martin Jakš	Czech Republic	36:35.7	+1:34.1
18	71	Dario Cologna	Switzerland	36:38.2	+1:36.6
19	6	Sergei Dolidovich	Belarus	36:42.9	+1:41.3
20	29	Ivan Babikov	Canada	36:47.0	+1:45.4
21	59	Matti Heikkinen	Finland	36:49.8	+1:48.2
22	19	Ville Nousiainen	Finland	36:57.2	+1:55.6
23	15	Lari Lehtonen	Finland	37:04.4	+2:02.8
24	9	Clément Parisse	France	37:06.9	+2:05.3
25	2	Perttu Hyvärinen	Finland	37:09.8	+2:08.2
26	33	Andrey Larkov	Russia	37:15.0	+2:13.4
27	51	Roland Clara	Italy	37:17.1	+2:15.5
28	27	Sergey Ustiugov	Russia	37:19.0	+2:17.4
29	40	Aivar Rehemaa	Estonia	37:19.6	+2:18.0
30	47	Jean-Marc Gaillard	France	37:21.5	+2:19.9
31	23	Jonas Dobler	Germany	37:27.8	+2:26.2
32	4	Graeme Killick	Canada	37:28.3	+2:26.7
33	66	Takatsugu Uda	Japan	37:29.8	+2:28.2
34	7	Noah Hoffman	United States	37:37.2	+2:35.6
35	11	Florian Notz	Germany	37:39.3	+2:37.7
36	31	Jonas Baumann	Switzerland	37:41.2	+2:39.6
37	28	Yury Astapenka	Belarus	37:42.6	+2:41.0
38	56	Max Hauke	Austria	37:49.3	+2:47.7
39	68	Veselin Tzinzov	Bulgaria	37:53.5	+2:51.9
40	60	Paul Constantin Pepene	Romania	37:58.2	+2:56.6
41	32	Dušan Kožíšek	Czech Republic	38:00.8	+2:59.2
42	54	Maciej Kreczmer	Poland	38:03.2	+3:01.6
43	10	David Hofer	Italy	38:15.2	+3:13.6
44	5	Akira Lenting	Japan	38:15.9	+3:14.3
45	38	Dominik Baldauf	Austria	38:17.3	+3:15.7
46	70	Martin Bajčičák	Slovakia	38:18.6	+3:17.0
47	64	Erik Bjornsen	United States	38:21.1	+3:19.5
48	44	Maciej Staręga	Poland	38:28.3	+3:26.7
49	67	Calle Halfvarsson	Sweden	38:37.5	+3:35.9
50	58	Sebastian Eisenlauer	Germany	38:58.0	+3:56.4
51	26	Jan Antolec	Poland	38:59.8	+3:58.2
52	62	Kyle Bratrud	United States	39:00.3	+3:58.7
53	42	Rinat Mukhin	Kazakhstan	39:05.3	+4:03.7
54	73	Petrică Hogiu	Romania	39:06.3	+4:04.7
55	52	Nikolay Chebotko	Kazakhstan	39:14.1	+4:12.5
56	46	Sergey Cherepanov	Kazakhstan	39:14.5	+4:12.9
57	48	Jesse Cockney	Canada	39:16.1	+4:14.5
58	18	Arvis Liepiņš	Latvia	39:22.0	+4:20.4
59	8	Kris Freeman	United States	39:27.5	+4:25.9
60	50	Jan Šrail	Czech Republic	39:30.1	+4:28.5
61	34	Sebastian Gazurek	Poland	39:39.1	+4:37.5
62	65	Petter Northug	Norway	39:45.7	+4:44.1
63	80	Mladen Plakalović	Bosnia and Herzegovina	39:47.1	+4:45.5
64	1	Imanol Rojo	Spain	39:53.7	+4:52.1
65	30	Peter Mlynár	Slovakia	39:55.6	+4:54.0
66	24	Edi Dadić	Croatia	39:59.2	+4:57.6
67	13	Sergey Mikayelyan	Armenia	39:59.6	+4:58.0
68	85	Aliaksandr Voranau	Belarus	40:05.3	+5:03.7
69	20	Andrew Pohl	New Zealand	40:21.5	+5:19.9
70	84	Stanimir Belomazhev	Bulgaria	40:36.3	+5:34.7
71	36	Denis Volotka	Kazakhstan	40:39.8	+5:38.2
72	14	Callum Watson	Australia	40:40.3	+5:38.7
73	16	Ruslan Perekhoda	Ukraine	40:47.0	+5:45.4
74	22	Martin Møller	Denmark	40:59.4	+5:57.8
75	12	Phillip Bellingham	Australia	41:02.9	+6:01.3
76	83	Shang Jincai	China	41:07.0	+6:05.4
77	75	Artur Yeghoyan	Armenia	41:10.0	+6:08.4
78	81	Brynjar Kristinsson	Iceland	41:18.0	+6:16.4
79	72	Indulis Bikše	Latvia	41:27.9	+6:26.3
80	86	Sattar Seid	Iran	41:33.6	+6:32.0
81	79	Ádám Kónya	Hungary	41:34.0	+6:32.4
82	78	Kostyantyn Yaremenko	Ukraine	41:35.4	+6:33.8
83	76	Stepan Terentjev	Lithuania	42:18.3	+7:16.7
84	82	Florin Daniel Pripici	Romania	42:49.0	+7:47.4
85	74	Paul Kovacs	Australia	44:53.2	+9:51.6
	77	Yordan Chuchuganov	Bulgaria	DNF	

=== Qualification ===
The race was held at 15:00.

Rank	Bib	Athlete	Country	Time	Deficit	Notes
1	63	Stanimir Belomazhev	Bulgaria	23:56.8		Q
2	66	Mladen Plakalović	Bosnia and Herzegovina	24:13.4	+16.6	Q
3	68	Ádám Kónya	Hungary	24:28.2	+31.4	Q
4	64	Lasse Hulgård	Denmark	24:44.4	+47.6	Q
5	54	Roberts Slotiņš	Latvia	24:51.3	+54.5	Q
6	67	Rejhan Šmrković	Serbia	24:54.6	+57.8	Q
7	57	Jānis Paipals	Latvia	25:01.9	+1:05.1	Q
8	55	Sattar Seid	Iran	25:08.2	+1:11.4	Q
9	62	Dževad Hadžifejzović	Serbia	25:20.1	+1:23.3	Q
10	59	Apostolos Angelis	Greece	25:27.7	+1:30.9	Q
11	69	Lukas Jakeliūnas	Lithuania	25:30.6	+1:33.8	
12	37	Boldyn Byambadorj	Mongolia	25:38.2	+1:41.4	
13	65	Tautvydas Strolia	Lithuania	25:42.6	+1:45.8	
14	51	Raivo Kivlenieks	Latvia	25:52.5	+1:55.7	
15	56	Simeon Deyanov	Bulgaria	25:52.8	+1:56.0	
16	14	Thorsten Langer	Belgium	25:53.3	+1:56.5	
17	47	Xin Detao	China	26:10.0	+2:13.2	
18	27	Imre Tagscherer	Hungary	26:13.8	+2:17.0	
19	46	Savaş Ateş	Turkey	26:14.7	+2:17.9	
20	38	Tue Rømer	Denmark	26:18.4	+2:21.6	
21	43	Marijus Butrimavičius	Lithuania	26:22.9	+2:26.1	
22	60	Jackson Bursill	Australia	26:24.5	+2:27.7	
23	61	Karl Peter Kristensen	Denmark	26:27.4	+2:30.6	
24	25	Batmönkhiin Achbadrakh	Mongolia	26:27.5	+2:30.7	
25	53	Toni Stanoeski	Macedonia	26:30.0	+2:33.2	
26	50	Yasin Shemshaki	Iran	26:38.2	+2:41.4	
27	33	Mirsad Pejčinović	Serbia	26:46.7	+2:49.9	
28	41	Kristóf Lagler	Hungary	26:46.8	+2:50.0	
29	48	Ömer Ayçiçek	Turkey	26:51.2	+2:54.4	
30	52	Carlos Lannes	Argentina	26:51.7	+2:54.9	
31	40	Kleanthis Karamichas	Greece	26:56.1	+2:59.3	
32	39	Georgios Nakas	Greece	27:02.7	+3:05.9	
33	28	Stefan Anić	Bosnia and Herzegovina	27:03.2	+3:06.4	
34	3	Liviu Dubalari	Moldova	27:04.5	+3:07.7	
35	49	Deividas Kliševičius	Lithuania	27:04.9	+3:08.1	
36	36	Stavrus Jada	Macedonia	27:26.8	+3:30.0	
37	30	Jan Rossiter	Ireland	27:34.8	+3:38.0	
38	44	Marko Starčević	Bosnia and Herzegovina	27:44.9	+3:48.1	
39	31	Milancho Krsteski	Macedonia	27:54.9	+3:58.1	
40	26	Balázs Gond	Hungary	27:55.7	+3:58.9	
41	34	Mikayel Mikayelyan	Armenia	27:59.8	+4:03.0	
42	45	Gjorgji Icoski	Macedonia	28:10.1	+4:13.3	
43	58	Mark Pollock	Australia	28:11.4	+4:14.6	
44	29	Jean-Loup Grégoire	Belgium	28:21.9	+4:25.1	
45	23	Mohamed Iliyas	India	28:24.0	+4:27.2	
46	9	Cristian Bocancea	Moldova	28:32.8	+4:36.0	
47	35	Georgios Papasis	Greece	28:33.5	+4:36.7	
48	17	Yonathan Fernandez	Chile	28:40.0	+4:43.2	
49	42	Ture Lange Nielsen	Denmark	28:58.3	+5:01.5	
50	32	Artush Mkrtchyan	Armenia	29:17.9	+5:21.1	
51	5	Juan Agurto	Chile	29:19.3	+5:22.5	
52	12	Felipe Arias	Chile	29:32.8	+5:36.0	
53	22	Kuldeep Dimri	India	29:49.4	+5:52.6	
54	21	Leonardo Lutz	Brazil	30:05.3	+6:08.5	
55	8	Sveatoslav Maliutin	Moldova	30:31.9	+6:35.1	
56	24	Aleksandar Jelić	Serbia	31:32.4	+7:35.6	
57	13	Fabrizio Bourguignon	Brazil	31:41.2	+7:44.4	
58	20	Radovan Radović	Montenegro	32:27.1	+8:30.3	
59	19	Mark Rajack	Trinidad and Tobago	35:28.8	+11:32.0	
60	1	Sergei Trelevskii	Kyrgyzstan	36:20.9	+12:24.1	
61	18	Nikola Anđelić	Montenegro	37:14.7	+13:17.9	
62	16	Samir Azzimani	Morocco	38:15.7	+14:18.9	
63	4	Rory Morrish	Ireland	39:39.3	+15:42.5	
64	10	Mansour Bazouni	Lebanon	39:49.0	+15:52.2	
65	7	Sarkis Draybi	Lebanon	40:31.9	+16:35.1	
66	2	César Baena	Venezuela	41:07.1	+17:10.3	
	6	Dominic McAleenan	Ireland	DNS		
	11	Victor Pînzaru	Moldova	DNS		
	15	Nemanja Košarac	Bosnia and Herzegovina	DNF		
