= Cross-country skiing at the 2014 Winter Olympics – Men's 15 kilometre classical =

Men's 15 kilometre classical at the XXII Olympic Winter Games
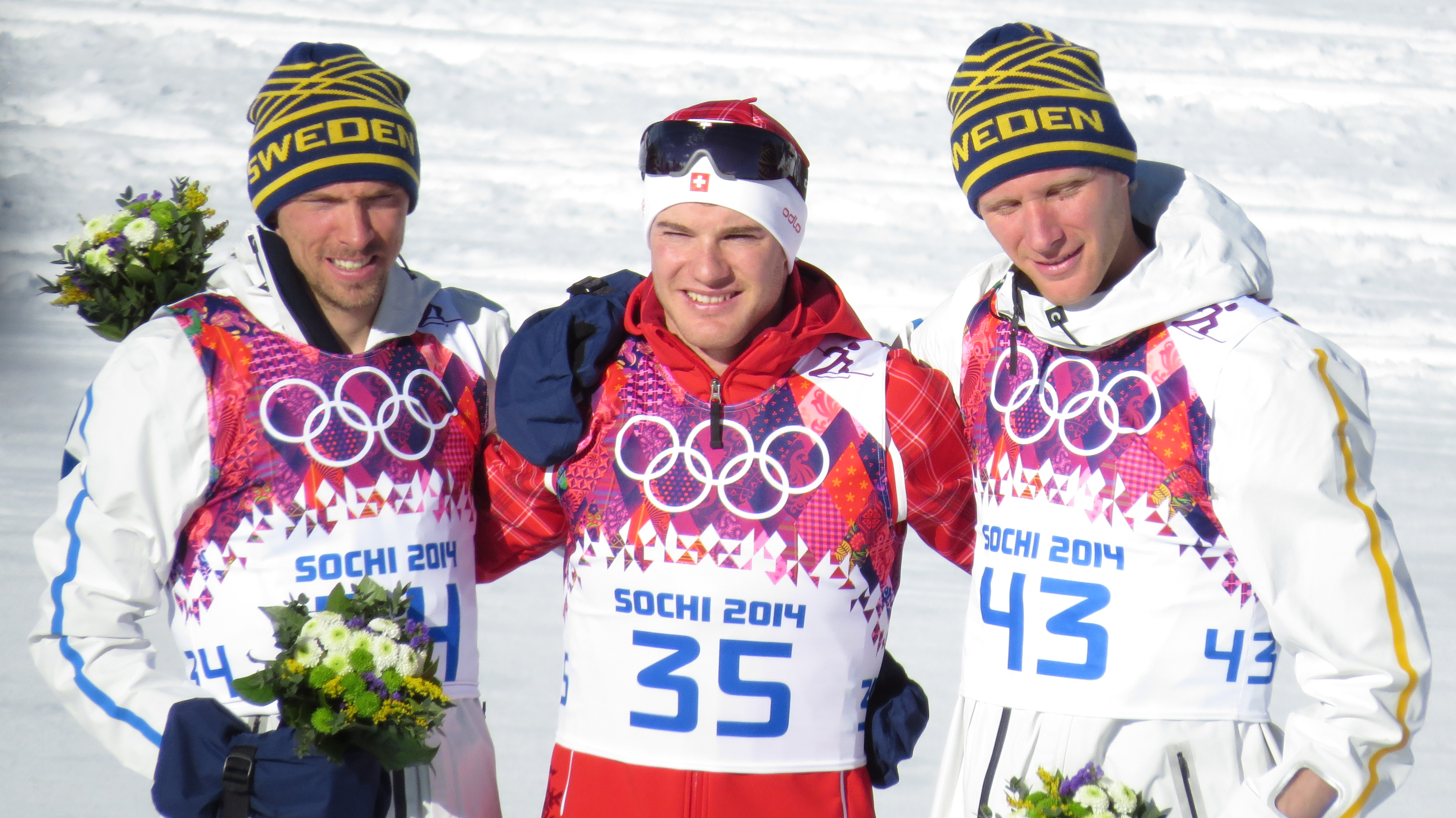
- Venue: Laura Biathlon & Ski Complex
- Dates: 14 February 2014
- Competitors: 91 from 45 nations
- Winning time: 38:29.7

Medalists
1st place, gold medalist(s)		Dario Cologna	Switzerland
2nd place, silver medalist(s)		Johan Olsson	Sweden
3rd place, bronze medalist(s)		Daniel Rickardsson	Sweden

The men's 15 kilometre classical cross-country skiing competition at the 2014 Sochi Olympics took place on 14 February at Laura Biathlon & Ski Complex. Dario Cologna from Switzerland was the defending champion from Vancouver and was successful in defending the title. Johan Olsson and Daniel Rickardsson from Sweden took silver and bronze.

== Qualification ==
An athlete with a maximum of 100 FIS distance points (the A standard) will be allowed to compete in both or one of the event (sprint/distance). An athlete with a maximum 120 FIS sprint points will be allowed to compete in the sprint event and 10 km for women or 15 km for men provided their distance points do not exceed 300 FIS points. NOC's who do not have any athlete meeting the A standard can enter one competitor of each sex (known as the basic quota) in only 10 km classical event for women or 15 km classical event for men. They must have a maximum of 300 FIS distance points at the end of qualifying on January 20, 2014. The qualification period began in July 2012.

== Results ==
The race was started at 14:00.

Rank	Bib	Name	Country	Time	Deficit
1st place, gold medalist(s)	35	Dario Cologna	Switzerland	38:29.7	—
2nd place, silver medalist(s)	34	Johan Olsson	Sweden	38:58.2	+28.5
3rd place, bronze medalist(s)	43	Daniel Rickardsson	Sweden	39:08.5	+38.8
4	13	Iivo Niskanen	Finland	39:08.7	+39.0
5	37	Lukáš Bauer	Czech Republic	39:28.6	+58.9
6	52	Chris Jespersen	Norway	39:30.6	+1:00.9
7	31	Alexander Bessmertnykh	Russia	39:37.7	+1:08.0
8	26	Axel Teichmann	Germany	39:42.4	+1.12.7
9	51	Alexey Poltoranin	Kazakhstan	39:43.2	+1:13.5
10	48	Marcus Hellner	Sweden	39:46.9	+1:17.2
11	49	Hannes Dotzler	Germany	39:49.9	+1:20.2
12	33	Eldar Rønning	Norway	40:02.8	+1:33.1
13	53	Martin Johnsrud Sundby	Norway	40:07.4	+1:37.7
14	29	Jens Filbrich	Germany	40:08.5	+1:38.8
15	28	Lars Nelson	Sweden	40:08.8	+1.39.1
16	47	Dmitry Yaparov	Russia	40:10.7	+1:41.0
17	40	Sami Jauhojärvi	Finland	40.14.4	+1:44.7
18	45	Pål Golberg	Norway	40:14.5	+1.44.8
19	42	Stanislav Volzhentsev	Russia	40:15.0	+1:45.3
20	41	Matti Heikkinen	Finland	40:17.8	+1:48.1
21	44	Jean-Marc Gaillard	France	40:22.8	+1:53.1
22	25	Curdin Perl	Switzerland	40:27.8	+1:58.1
23	10	Martin Bajčičák	Slovakia	40:28.0	+1:58.3
24	11	Jonas Baumann	Switzerland	40.33.2	+2:03.5
25	46	Evgeniy Belov	Russia	40:36.8	+2:07.1
26	36	Tim Tscharnke	Germany	40:41.3	+2:11.6
27	60	Philipp Haelg	Liechtenstein	40:41.5	+2:11.8
28	14	Ville Nousiainen	Finland	40:52.6	+2:22.9
29	4	Maciej Kreczmer	Poland	40.58.7	+2:29.0
30	22	Francesco de Fabiani	Italy	41:00.8	+2:31.1
31	32	Noah Hoffman	United States	41:02.7	+2:33.0
32	30	Dietmar Nöckler	Italy	41:11.9	+2:42.2
33	7	Nikolay Chebotko	Kazakhstan	41.14.1	+2:44.4
34	21	Yevgeniy Velichko	Kazakhstan	41:16.4	+2:46.7
35	38	Devon Kershaw	Canada	41:17.1	+2:47.4
36	27	Mattia Pellegrin	Italy	41:20.1	+2:50.4
37	70	Andrew Young	Great Britain	41:29.6	+2:59.9
38	12	Erik Bjornsen	United States	41:44.7	+3:15.0
39	39	Ivan Babikov	Canada	41:49.2	+3:19.5
40	15	Aivar Rehemaa	Estonia	41.49.8	+3:20.1
41	20	Veselin Tzinzov	Bulgaria	42:06.3	+3:36.6
42	6	Algo Kärp	Estonia	42:16.5	+3.46.8
43	16	Adrien Backscheider	France	42.21.7	+3:52.0
44	9	Andrew Musgrave	Great Britain	42.25.7	+3.56.0
45	57	Karel Tammjärv	Estonia	42:27.7	+3.58.0
46	1	Sergey Mikayelyan	Armenia	42:39.1	+4:09.4
47	18	Brian Gregg	United States	42:42.0	+4:12.3
48	2	Fabio Pasini	Italy	42:42.3	+4.12.6
49	54	Alexander Lasutkin	Belarus	42:45.1	+4.15.4
50	55	Imanol Rojo	Spain	42:45.4	+4.15.7
51	64	Peter Mlynár	Slovakia	42:50.3	+4.20.6
52	23	Kris Freeman	United States	42:54.8	+4:25.1
53	17	Sergei Dolidovich	Belarus	42:55.4	+4:25.7
54	58	Yerdos Akhmadiyev	Kazakhstan	43:02.2	+4:32.5
55	65	Sebastian Gazurek	Poland	43:06.7	+4:37.0
56	5	Cyril Miranda	France	43:22.5	+4:52.8
57	3	Max Hauke	Austria	43:23.4	+4:53.7
58	68	Martin Møller	Denmark	43:29.7	+5:00.0
59	24	Michail Semenov	Belarus	43:36.0	+5:06.3
60	62	Edi Dadić	Croatia	43:38.8	+5:09.1
61	59	Raido Ränkel	Estonia	43:38.9	+5:09.2
62	8	Paul Constantin Pepene	Romania	43:39.4	+5:09.7
63	56	Javier Gutiérrez Cuevas	Spain	43:43.9	+5:14.2
64	69	Pawel Klisz	Poland	43:51.6	+5:21.9
65	19	Graeme Killick	Canada	44:04.8	+5:35.1
66	63	Maciej Staręga	Poland	44:07.1	+5:37.4
67	66	Callum Smith	Great Britain	44:14.7	+5:45.0
68	78	Hwang Jun-Ho	South Korea	44:34.8	+6:05.1
69	71	Oleksiy Krasovsky	Ukraine	44:35.4	+6:05.7
70	72	Vytautas Strolia	Lithuania	45:08.0	+6:38.3
71	73	Sabahattin Oğlago	Turkey	45:16.0	+6:46.3
72	81	Sun Qinghai	China	45:28.2	+6:58.5
73	75	Arvis Liepiņš	Latvia	45:36.2	+7:06.5
74	85	Sævar Birgisson	Iceland	45:44.2	+7:14.5
75	67	Callum Watson	Australia	45:46.5	+7:16.8
76	74	Phillip Bellingham	Australia	46:16.4	+7:46.7
77	61	Milanko Petrović	Serbia	46:42.2	+8:12.5
78	80	Milán Szabó	Hungary	47:01.3	+8:31.6
79	83	Sattar Seid	Iran	47:16.1	+8:46.4
80	86	Bold Byambadorj	Mongolia	48:29.6	+9:59.9
81	79	Darko Damjanovski	Macedonia	48:34.9	+10:05.2
82	87	Jan Rossiter	Ireland	48:44.6	+10:14.9
83	84	Federico Cichero	Argentina	49:11.3	+10:41.6
84	88	Tucker Murphy	Bermuda	49:19.9	+10:50.2
85	89	Nadeem Iqbal	India	55:12.5	+16:42.8
86	91	Dachhiri Sherpa	Nepal	55:39.3	+17:09.6
87	92	Roberto Carcelen	Peru	1:06:28.9	+27:59.2
	50	Alex Harvey	Canada	DNF	
	82	Jānis Paipals	Latvia	DNF	
	77	Rejhan Šmrković	Serbia	DNF	
	90	Gary di Silvestri	Dominica	DNF	
	76	Artur Yeghoyan	Armenia	DNS	
