= Chelsea Holmes =

- Chelsea Holmes (actor)
- Chelsea Holmes (skier) born 1987
