= Algo Kärp =

Estonian cross-country skier (born 1985)

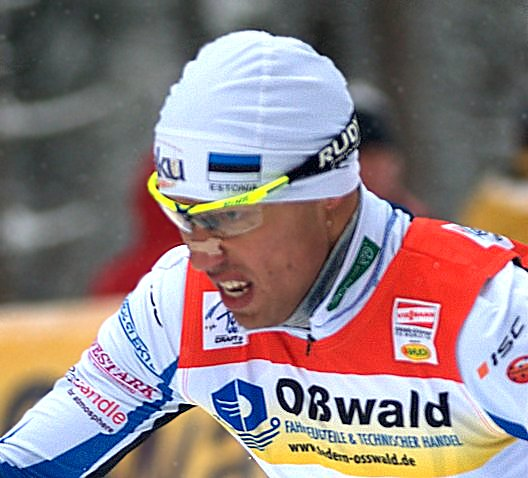
- Algo Kärp in 2010

Personal information
- Nationality: Estonia
- Born: 13 April 1985 (age 41) Tarvastu, then part of Estonian SSR, Soviet Union

Sport
- Sport: Skiing
- Club: SC Viljandi

World Cup career
- Seasons: 13 – (2006–2018)
- Indiv. starts: 92
- Indiv. podiums: 0
- Team starts: 4
- Team podiums: 0
- Overall titles: 0 – (122nd in 2014)
- Discipline titles: 0

Algo Kärp (born 13 April 1985 in Tarvastu) is a former Estonian cross-country skier who competed from 2004 to 2018. His best World Cup finish was 16th in a 50km event in 2014 Oslo, Norway. He represented Estonia at the 2010, 2014 and 2018 Winter Olympics.

On 5 March 2019 Kärp confessed that, since 2016, he and Karel Tammjärv had used blood doping assisted by German sports doctor Mark Schmidt. He admitted that he was not aware of the third Estonian in the doping scandal, Andreas Veerpalu, using blood doping.

== Cross-country skiing results ==
All results are sourced from the International Ski Federation (FIS).

=== Olympic Games ===
Year	Age	15 km individual	30 km skiathlon	50 km mass start	Sprint	4 × 10 km relay	Team sprint
2010	24	—	—	41	—	14	—
2014	28	42	—	—	—	10	—
2018	32	—	—	17	—	12	—

=== World Championships ===
Year	Age	15 km individual	30 km skiathlon	50 km mass start	Sprint	4 × 10 km relay	Team sprint
2009	23	57	—	—	—	—	—
2011	25	23	—	—	—	10	—
2013	27	—	—	47	—	—	—
2015	29	—	—	21	—	—	—
2017	31	26	—	—	—	13	—

=== World Cup ===
==== Season standings ====
Season	Age	Discipline standings			Ski Tour standings			
Season	Age	Overall	Distance	Sprint	Nordic Opening	Tour de Ski	World Cup Final	Ski Tour Canada
2006	20	NC	NC	NC	—N/a	—N/a	—N/a	—N/a
2007	21	NC	NC	NC	—N/a	—	—N/a	—N/a
2008	22	NC	NC	NC	—N/a	—	—	—N/a
2009	23	146	90	NC	—N/a	41	—	—N/a
2010	24	148	97	NC	—N/a	DNF	—	—N/a
2011	25	149	92	NC	DNF	—	—N/a	—N/a
2012	26	NC	NC	NC	—	54	—	—N/a
2013	27	NC	NC	NC	—	57	—	—N/a
2014	28	122	74	NC	59	DNF	—	—N/a
2015	29	NC	NC	NC	—	DNF	—N/a	—N/a
2016	30	NC	NC	—	—	—	—N/a	—
2017	31	NC	NC	—	—	—	—	—N/a
2018	32	NC	NC	—	—	—	—	—N/a
