= Ivana Kovačević =

Serbian cross-country skier (born 1994)

Personal information
- Born: 27 December 1994 (age 30); Sokolac
- Height: 1.69 m (5 ft 7 in)
- Weight: 61 kg (134 lb)

Sport
- Country: Serbia
- Sport: Cross-country skiing

Ivana Kovačević (born 27 December 1994) is a cross-country skier from Serbia. She competed for Serbia at the 2014 Winter Olympics in the cross-country skiing events.
