= Serbia at the 2014 Winter Olympics =

- IOC code: SRB
- NOC: Olympic Committee of Serbia
- Website: www.oks.org.rs (in Serbian)

in Sochi
- Competitors: 8 in 5 sports
- Flag bearers: Milanko Petrović (opening); Nevena Ignjatović (closing)
- Medals: Gold 0 Silver 0 Bronze 0 Total 0

Winter Olympics appearances (overview)
- 2010; 2014; 2018; 2022; 2026

Other related appearances
- Yugoslavia (1924–1992); Serbia and Montenegro (1998–2006)

Serbia competed at the 2014 Winter Olympics in Sochi, Russia, from 7 to 23 February 2014. A team of eight athletes in five sports was selected, representing a decrease of two athletes from Vancouver. Serbia has also qualified in snowboarding for the first time ever.

== Alpine skiing ==
Serbia qualified 1 man and 1 woman by the latest FIS Olympic list.

Athlete	Event	Run 1		Run 2		Total	
Athlete	Event	Time	Rank	Time	Rank	Time	Rank
Marko Vukićević	Men's super-G	—N/a				1:23.88	48
Marko Vukićević	Men's giant slalom	DNF					
Marko Vukićević	Men's slalom	DNF					
Nevena Ignjatović	Women's giant slalom	1:22.14	29	1:20.32	26	2:42.46	28
Nevena Ignjatović	Women's slalom	DNF					

== Biathlon ==
Based on their performance at the 2012 and 2013 Biathlon World Championships, Serbia qualified 1 man.

Athlete	Event	Time	Misses	Rank
Milanko Petrović	Men's sprint	27:08.2	3 (1+2)	69
Milanko Petrović	Men's individual	56:45.4	6 (1+2+0+3)	69

== Bobsleigh ==
Serbia has qualified 2 men by the latest FIBT rankings.

Athlete	Event	Run 1		Run 2		Run 3		Run 4		Total	
Athlete	Event	Time	Rank	Time	Rank	Time	Rank	Time	Rank	Time	Rank
Aleksandar Bundalo; Vuk Rađenović*	Two-man	58.31	29	58.56	29	DNF					

* – Denotes the driver of each sled

== Cross-country skiing ==
Serbia has qualified 2 men and 1 woman.

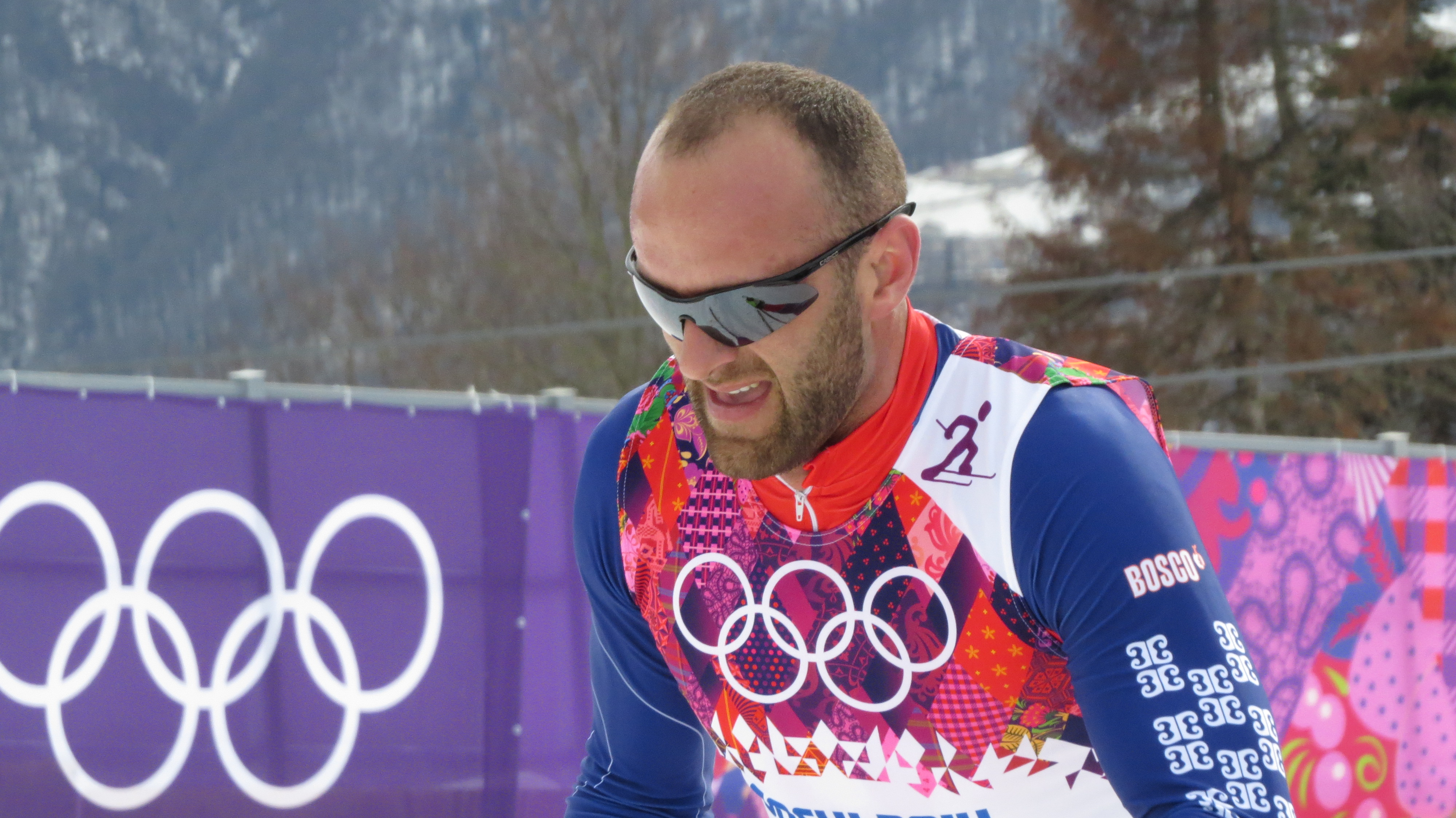
Milanko Petrović competing in 15 km classical

Distance

Athlete	Event	Final		
Athlete	Event	Time	Deficit	Rank
Milanko Petrović	Men's 15 km classical	46:42.2	+8:12.5	77
Milanko Petrović	Men's 50 km freestyle	1:53:35.1	+6:39.9	50
Rejhan Šmrković	Men's 15 km classical	DNF		
Ivana Kovačević	Women's 10 km classical	45:21.3	+17:03.5	72

Sprint

Athlete	Event	Qualification		Quarterfinal		Semifinal		Final	
Athlete	Event	Time	Rank	Time	Rank	Time	Rank	Time	Rank
Milanko Petrović	Men's sprint	3:50.20	63	did not advance					
Rejhan Šmrković	Men's sprint	4:02.28	76	did not advance					

== Snowboarding ==
Serbia qualified 1 woman by the latest FIS Olympic list.

Alpine

Athlete	Event	Qualification		Round of 16	Quarterfinal	Semifinal	Final	
Athlete	Event	Time	Rank	Opposition Time	Opposition Time	Opposition Time	Opposition Time	Rank
Nina Micić	Women's giant slalom	2:04.94	27	did not advance				
Nina Micić	Women's slalom	1:08.07	31	did not advance				

== See also ==
- Serbia at the 2014 Summer Youth Olympics
