= Manca Slabanja =

Slovenian cross-country skier

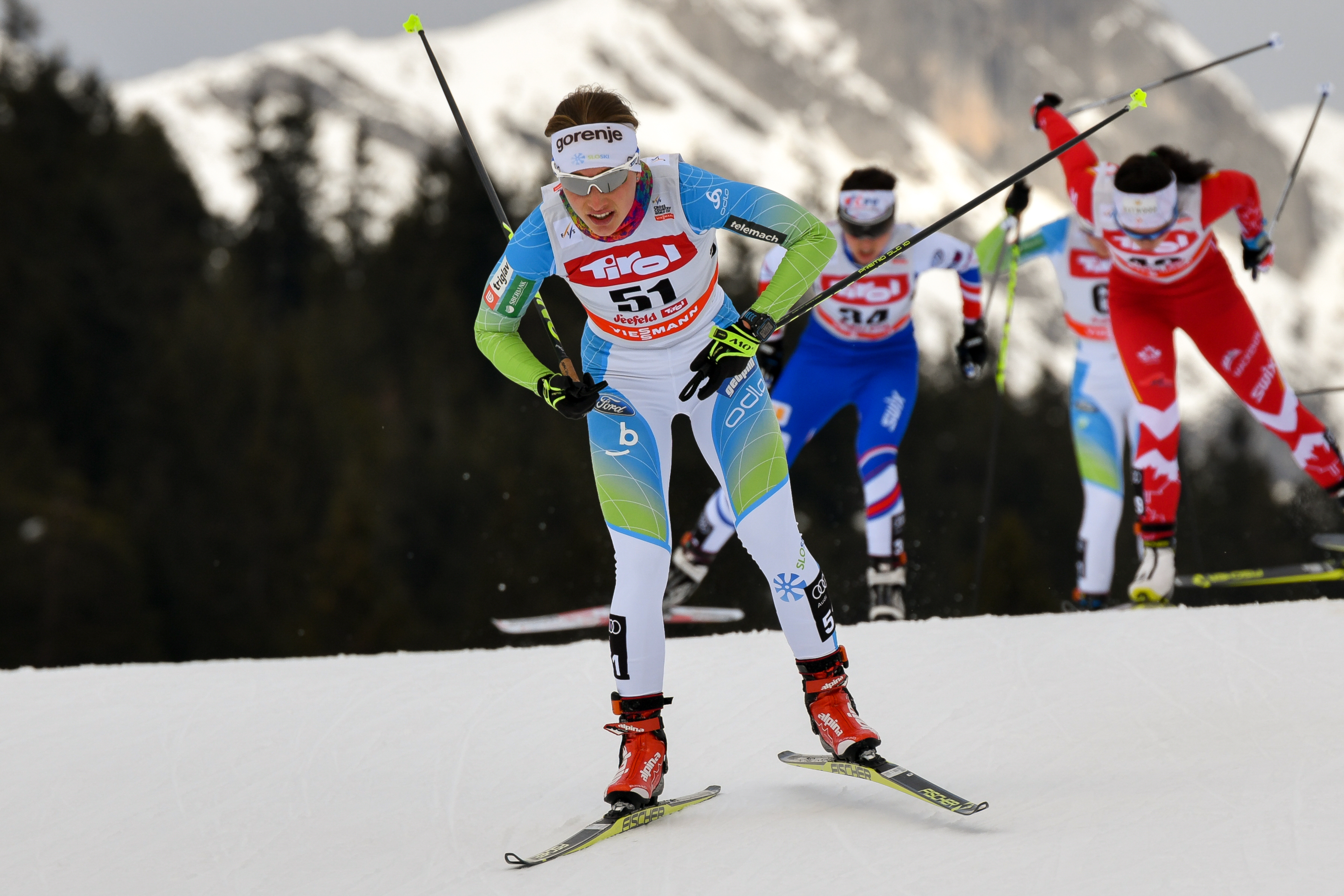
- Manca Slabanja in 2018

Personal information
- Nationality: Slovenia
- Born: 8 August 1995 (age 30)

Sport
- Sport: Skiing
- Club: SK Ihan

World Cup career
- Seasons: 4 – (2016–2019)
- Indiv. starts: 9
- Indiv. podiums: 0
- Team starts: 1
- Team podiums: 0
- Overall titles: 0
- Discipline titles: 0

Manca Slabanja (born 8 August 1995) is a Slovenian cross-country skier. She competed in the women's 15 kilometre skiathlon at the 2018 Winter Olympics.

== Cross-country skiing results ==
All results are sourced from the International Ski Federation (FIS).

=== Olympic Games ===
Year	Age	10 km individual	15 km skiathlon	30 km mass start	Sprint	4 × 5 km relay	Team sprint
2018	22	54	59	—	—	—	—

=== World Cup ===
==== Season standings ====
Season	Age	Discipline standings				Ski Tour standings			
Season	Age	Overall	Distance	Sprint	U23	Nordic Opening	Tour de Ski	World Cup Final	Ski Tour Canada
2016	20	NC	—	NC	NC	—	—	—N/a	—
2017	21	NC	NC	—	NC	—	—	—	—N/a
2018	22	NC	NC	NC	NC	—	—	—	—N/a
2019	23	NC	—	NC	—N/a	—	DNF	—	—N/a
