= Sara Pellegrini =

Italian cross-country skier

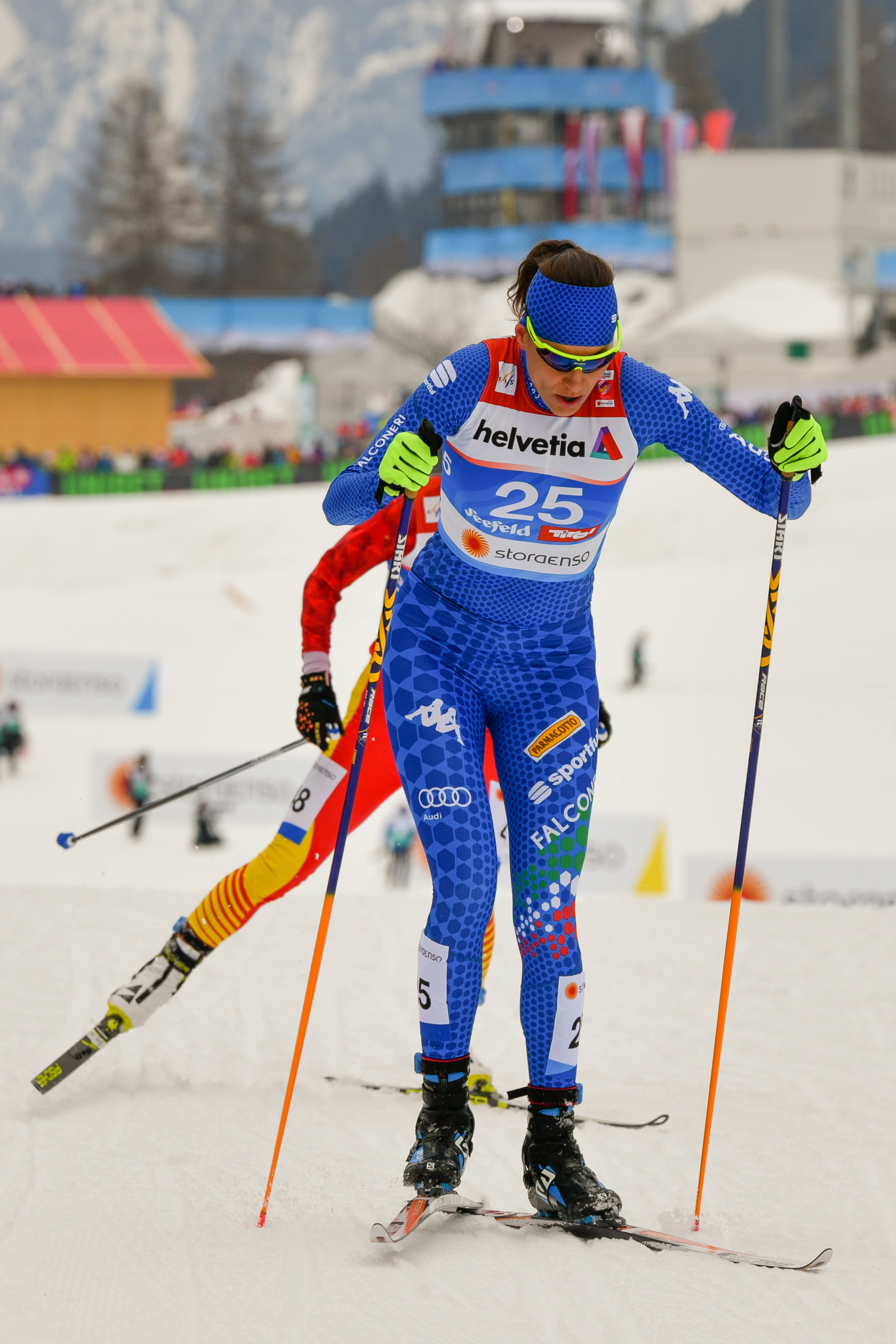

Personal information
- Nationality: Italy
- Born: 5 May 1986 (age 40) Varel, West Germany

Sport
- Sport: Skiing
- Club: Fiamme Oro

World Cup career
- Seasons: 6 – (2014, 2016–2020)
- Indiv. starts: 21
- Indiv. podiums: 0
- Team starts: 1
- Team podiums: 0
- Overall titles: 0 – (83rd in 2019)
- Discipline titles: 0
- Updated on 7 April 2020

Sara Pellegrini (born 5 May 1986) is an Italian cross-country skier who competes internationally.

She competed for Italy at the FIS Nordic World Ski Championships 2017 in Lahti, Finland.

== Cross-country skiing results ==
All results are sourced from the International Ski Federation (FIS).

=== Olympic Games ===
Year	Age	10 km individual	15 km skiathlon	30 km mass start	Sprint	4 × 5 km relay	Team sprint
2018	31	38	35	35	—	—	—

=== World Championships ===
Year	Age	10 km individual	15 km skiathlon	30 km mass start	Sprint	4 × 5 km relay	Team sprint
2017	30	—	—	28	—	—	—
2019	32	—	35	35	—	—	—

=== World Cup ===
==== Season standings ====
Season	Age	Discipline standings			Ski Tour standings				
Season	Age	Overall	Distance	Sprint	Nordic Opening	Tour de Ski	Ski Tour 2020	World Cup Final	Ski Tour Canada
2014	27	NC	NC	—	—	—	—N/a	—	—N/a
2016	29	NC	NC	—	—	—	—N/a	—N/a	—
2017	30	NC	NC	—	—	—	—N/a	—	—N/a
2018	31	NC	NC	—	—	—	—N/a	—	—N/a
2019	32	83	75	NC	—	27	—N/a	—	—N/a
2020	33	NC	NC	—	—	—	—	—N/a	—N/a
