= Sebastian Gazurek =

Polish cross-country skier

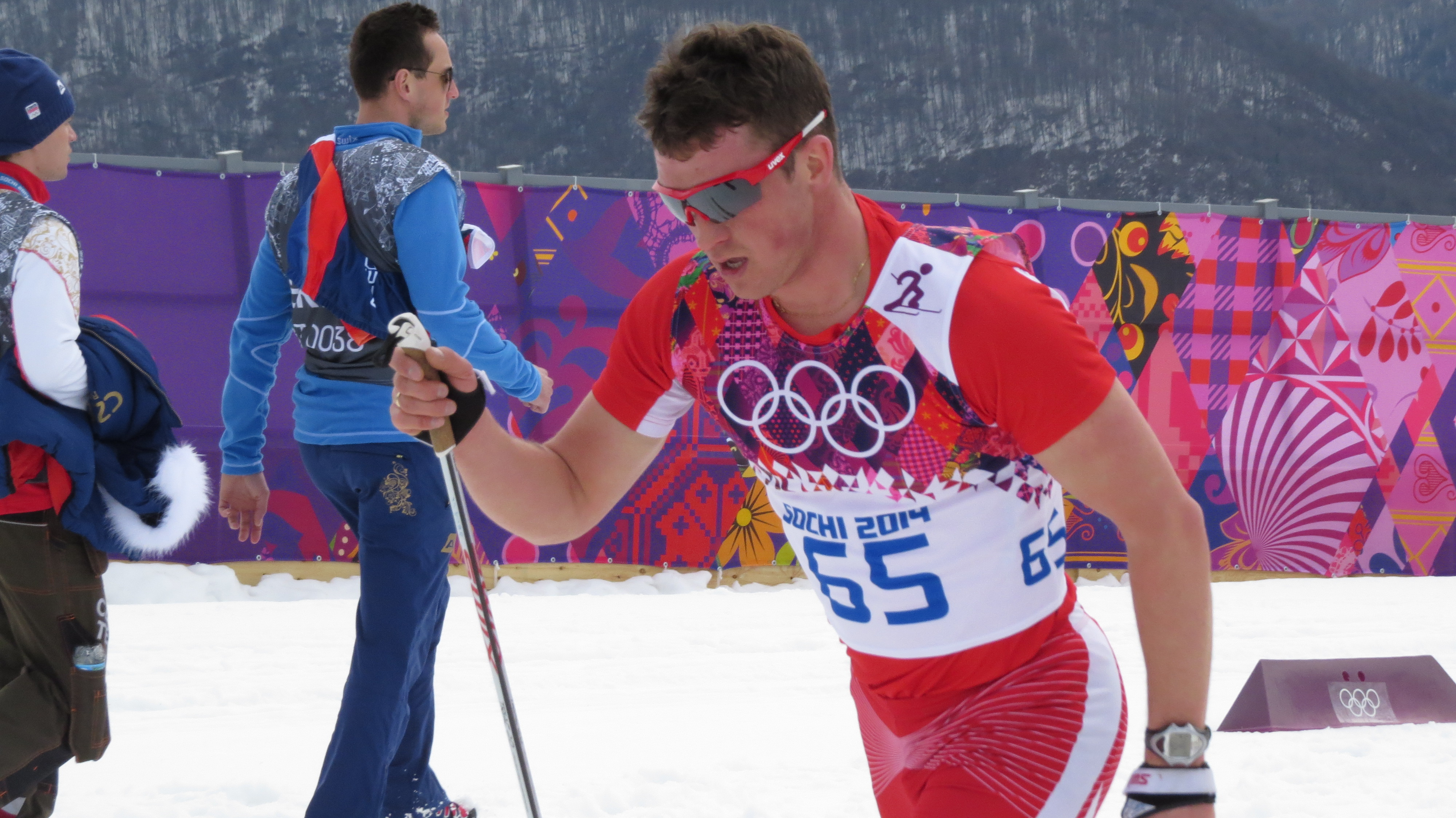
Sebastian Gazurek

Sebastian Gazurek (born 18 June 1990 in Istebna) is a Polish cross-country skier. He competed at the FIS Nordic World Ski Championships 2013 in Val di Fiemme, and at the 2014 Winter Olympics in Sochi, in 15 kilometre classical and 4 × 10 kilometre relay.
