= Jan Rossiter =

Irish cross-country skier (born 1987)

Personal information
- Born: 21 September 1987 (age 38)
Medal record
Cross-country skiing
Representing Ireland

Jan Rossiter (born 21 September 1987) is a cross-country skier from Ireland. He competed for Ireland at the 2014 Winter Olympics in the Cross-country skiing Men's 15 kilometre classical event.

== See also ==
- Ireland at the 2014 Winter Olympics
