= Cross-country skiing at the 2018 Winter Olympics – Women's 15 kilometre skiathlon =

Women's 15 kilometre skiathlon at the XXIII Olympic Winter Games
- Cross-country skiing
- Venue: Alpensia Cross-Country Skiing Centre
- Dates: 10 February 2018
- Competitors: 61 from 23 nations
- Winning time: 40:44.9

Medalists
1st place, gold medalist(s)		Charlotte Kalla	Sweden
2nd place, silver medalist(s)		Marit Bjørgen	Norway
3rd place, bronze medalist(s)		Krista Pärmäkoski	Finland

The women's 15 kilometre skiathlon cross-country skiing competition at the 2018 Winter Olympics was held on 10 February 2018 at 16:15 KST at the Alpensia Cross-Country Skiing Centre in Pyeongchang, South Korea. Charlotte Kalla of Sweden finished first to win the first gold medal of the 2018 Winter Games. The defending champion Marit Bjørgen finished second. For her, this was the eleventh Olympic medal, making her the most successful female cross-country skier. Krista Pärmäkoski took bronze.

== Summary ==
The defending champion Marit Bjørgen, as well as the silver medalist Charlotte Kalla and the bronze medalist Heidi Weng, participated in the event. After the exchange, a group of about a dozen athletes stayed ahead, and by 11 km only 9 left. Then Charlotte Kalla escaped, leaving behind Bjørgen, Krista Pärmäkoski, and Ebba Andersson chasing her. Kalla became the champion, with Bjørgen second, and Pärmäkoski third.

In the nighttime victory ceremony, the medals for the event were presented by Thomas Bach, president of the International Olympic Committee, accompanied by Roman Kumpost, FIS council member.

Medalists
Gold medal	Silver medal	Bronze medal
Charlotte Kalla	Marit Bjørgen	Krista Pärmäkoski
Sweden	Norway	Finland

== Qualification ==
A total of up to 310 cross-country skiers qualified across all eleven events. Athletes qualified for this event by having met the A qualification standard, which meant having 100 or less FIS Points in the distance classification. The Points list takes into average the best results of athletes per discipline during the qualification period (1 July 2016 to 21 January 2018). Countries received additional quotas by having athletes ranked in the top 30 of the FIS Olympics Points list (two per gender maximum, overall across all events). Countries also received an additional quota (one per gender maximum) if an athlete was ranked in the top 300 of the FIS Olympics Points list. After the distribution of B standard quotas, the remaining quotas were distributed using the Olympic FIS Points list, with each athlete only counting once for qualification purposes. A country could only enter a maximum of four athletes for the event.

== Competition schedule ==
All times are (UTC+9).

Date	Time	Event
10 February	16:15	Final

== Results ==
The race was started at 16:15.

Rank	Bib	Name	Country	7.5 km classic	Rank	Pitstop	7.5 km free	Rank	Finish time	Deficit
1st place, gold medalist(s)	5	Charlotte Kalla	Sweden	21:23.4	2	31.8	18:49.7	1	40:44.9	—
2nd place, silver medalist(s)	8	Marit Bjørgen	Norway	21:23.1	1	31.0	18:58.6	2	40:52.7	+7.8
3rd place, bronze medalist(s)	7	Krista Pärmäkoski	Finland	21:27.9	10	27.9	18:59.2	3	40:55.0	+10.1
4	18	Ebba Andersson	Sweden	21:25.4	5	30.6	18:59.8	4	40:55.8	+10.9
5	3	Jessie Diggins	United States	21:29.4	13	27.9	19:02.3	5	40:59.6	+14.7
6	10	Nathalie von Siebenthal	Switzerland	21:27.1	8	30.3	19:05.1	6	41:02.5	+17.6
7	4	Teresa Stadlober	Austria	21:25.8	6	30.4	19:15.3	7	41:11.5	+26.6
8	12	Natalya Nepryayeva	Olympic Athletes from Russia	21:28.2	11	28.1	19:21.6	8	41:17.9	+33.0
9	1	Heidi Weng	Norway	21:23.8	3	28.1	19:33.7	9	41:25.6	+40.7
10	21	Stina Nilsson	Sweden	21:27.5	9	31.6	19:34.7	10	41:33.8	+48.9
11	2	Ingvild Flugstad Østberg	Norway	21:24.3	4	28.5	19:50.4	14	41:43.2	+58.3
12	11	Anastasia Sedova	Olympic Athletes from Russia	21:43.8	19	30.7	19:43.2	12	41:57.7	+1:12.8
13	28	Anouk Faivre Picon	France	21:45.5	20	31.0	19:47.3	13	42:03.8	+1:18.9
14	30	Masako Ishida	Japan	21:39.2	15	30.5	19:54.4	17	42:04.1	+1:19.2
15	6	Ragnhild Haga	Norway	21:40.2	16	33.7	19:53.7	16	42:07.6	+1:22.7
16	9	Kerttu Niskanen	Finland	21:26.6	7	32.0	20:16.6	23	42:15.2	+1:30.3
17	22	Justyna Kowalczyk	Poland	21:28.8	12	32.3	20:29.7	25	42:30.8	+1:45.9
18	26	Yuliya Belorukova	Olympic Athletes from Russia	22:02.5	22	32.6	20:15.9	22	42:51.0	+2:06.1
19	14	Laura Mononen	Finland	21:48.3	21	33.1	20:31.6	26	42:53.0	+2:08.1
20	35	Victoria Carl	Germany	21:43.6	18	29.9	20:40.9	32	42:54.4	+2:09.5
21	34	Alisa Zhambalova	Olympic Athletes from Russia	22:34.9	28	32.3	19:51.9	15	42:59.1	+2:14.2
22	20	Katharina Hennig	Germany	21:40.9	17	30.4	20:48.9	36	43:00.2	+2:15.3
23	29	Aurore Jéan	France	22:20.6	26	34.6	20:05.6	19	43:00.8	+2:15.9
24	25	Johanna Matintalo	Finland	21:32.9	14	29.4	21:00.1	40	43:02.4	+2:17.5
25	16	Stefanie Böhler	Germany	22:19.6	25	33.2	20:09.8	20	43:02.6	+2:17.7
26	24	Elisa Brocard	Italy	22:34.5	27	30.3	20:12.8	21	43:17.6	+2:32.7
27	31	Nadine Fähndrich	Switzerland	22:03.9	23	31.9	21:14.6	45	43:50.4	+3:05.5
28	17	Petra Novaková	Czech Republic	23:25.9	38	32.8	19:56.9	18	43:55.6	+3:10.7
29	23	Coraline Hugue	France	23:43.8	49	31.2	19:41.2	11	43:56.2	+3:11.3
30	56	Sylwia Jaśkowiec	Poland	22:51.2	31	31.3	20:33.8	29	43:56.3	+3:11.4
31	55	Ewelina Marcisz	Poland	22:50.4	29	31.5	20:34.8	30	43:56.7	+3:11.8
32	13	Anna Haag	Sweden	22:14.1	24	34.0	21:13.7	44	44:01.8	+3:16.9
33	53	Cendrine Browne	Canada	23:04.6	35	33.1	20:24.2	24	44:01.9	+3:17.0
34	27	Caitlin Patterson	United States	23:07.1	36	34.9	20:32.9	27	44:14.9	+3:30.0
35	38	Sara Pellegrini	Italy	23:03.7	33	31.9	20:40.7	31	44:16.3	+3:31.4
36	37	Anna Shevchenko	Kazakhstan	22:52.3	32	32.9	20:59.9	39	44:25.1	+3:40.2
37	33	Anna Comarella	Italy	22:50.7	30	29.1	21:06.1	41	44:25.9	+3:41.0
38	32	Kateřina Beroušková	Czech Republic	23:03.9	34	32.5	20:56.3	38	44:32.7	+3:47.8
39	44	Barbara Jezeršek	Australia	23:34.0	43	31.7	20:33.6	28	44:39.3	+3:54.4
40	19	Kikkan Randall	United States	23:29.2	39	35.0	20:43.0	33	44:47.2	+4:02.3
41	58	Martyna Galewicz	Poland	23:31.8	41	34.6	20:44.9	34	44:51.3	+4:06.4
42	57	Yulia Tikhonova	Belarus	23:29.6	40	33.3	20:54.2	37	44:57.1	+4:12.2
43	45	Barbora Havlíčková	Czech Republic	23:52.3	53	31.4	20:48.4	35	45:12.1	+4:27.2
44	50	Emily Nishikawa	Canada	23:36.0	44	32.2	21:08.4	43	45:16.6	+4:31.7
45	43	Tetyana Antypenko	Ukraine	23:32.3	42	34.9	21:24.0	49	45:31.2	+4:46.3
46	41	Polina Seronosova	Belarus	23:09.8	37	31.3	21:53.8	57	45:34.9	+4:50.0
47	42	Petra Hynčicová	Czech Republic	23:42.0	48	37.9	21:22.5	48	45:42.4	+4:57.5
48	61	Anne-Marie Comeau	Canada	23:49.7	51	36.9	21:16.2	46	45:42.8	+4:57.9
49	48	Ilaria Debertolis	Italy	23:38.7	46	41.3	21:24.6	50	45:44.6	+4:59.7
50	59	Jessica Yeaton	Australia	23:45.2	50	39.5	21:20.1	47	45:44.8	+4:59.9
51	52	Li Xin	China	23:51.7	52	38.9	21:31.3	51	46:01.9	+5:17.0
52	60	Dahria Beatty	Canada	23:58.9	54	35.4	21:43.0	55	46:17.3	+5:32.4
53	40	Maryna Antsybor	Ukraine	24:09.3	55	32.4	21:36.5	52	46:18.2	+5:33.3
54	46	Elena Kolomina	Kazakhstan	24:12.1	56	37.8	21:38.6	54	46:28.5	+5:43.6
55	54	Chi Chunxue	China	24:16.1	57	35.7	21:47.2	56	46:39.0	+5:54.1
56	51	Tatjana Mannima	Estonia	24:29.4	58	35.2	21:37.1	53	46:41.7	+5:56.8
57	47	Lee Chae-won	South Korea	25:05.5	59	32.2	21:06.8	42	46:44.5	+5:59.6
58	36	Rosie Brennan	United States	23:36.7	45	42.7	23:16.6	60	47:36.0	+6:51.1
59	49	Manca Slabanja	Slovenia	25:10.1	61	30.9	22:16.8	58	47:57.8	+7:12.9
60	62	Annika Taylor	Great Britain	25:08.0	60	31.5	22:29.6	59	48:09.1	+7:24.2
	39	Valeriya Tyuleneva	Kazakhstan	23:41.6	47	42.7	DNF			
	15	Nicole Fessel	Germany	DNS						
