= Rejhan Šmrković =

Serbian cross country skier (born 1991)

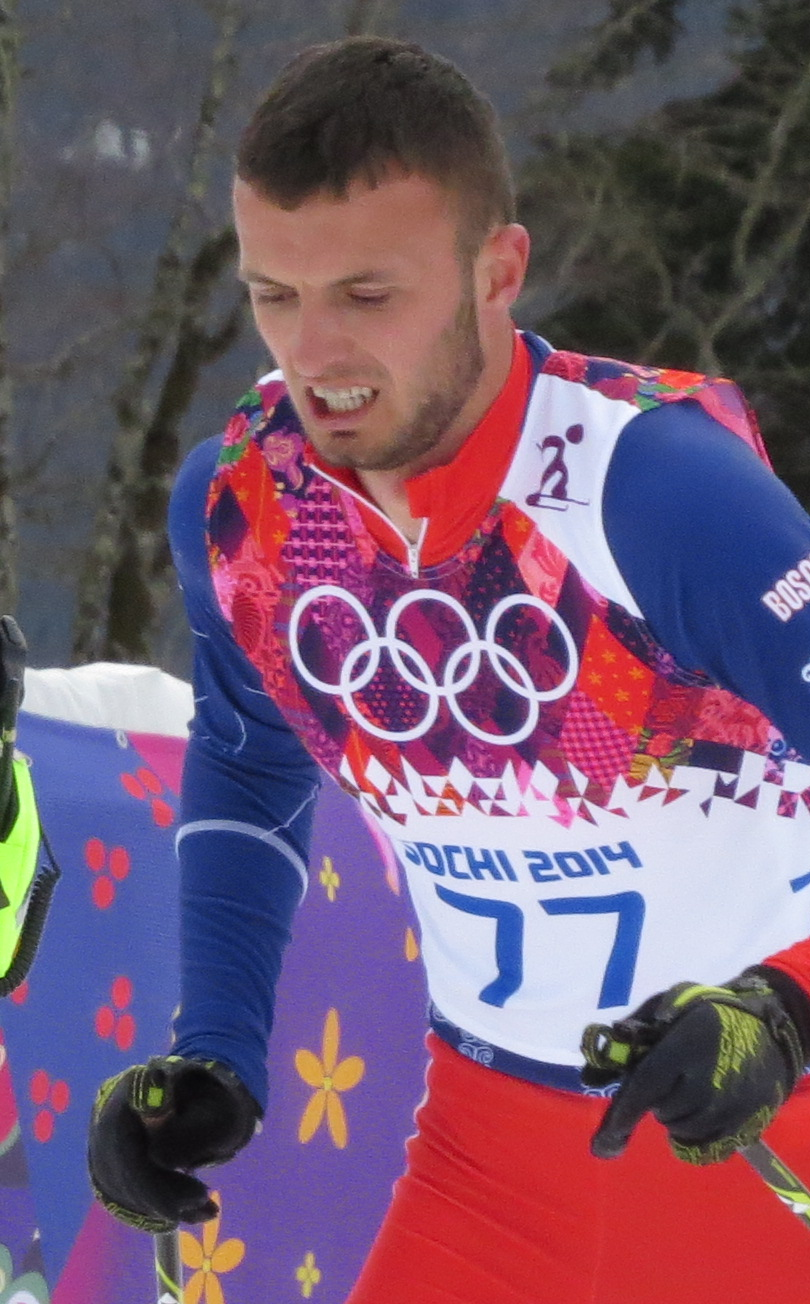
- Šmrković in the men's 15 km classical event at the 2014 Winter Olympics

Personal information
- Born: 18 December 1991 (age 33); Sjenica, Zlatibor, Serbia
- Height: 182 cm (6 ft 0 in)
- Weight: 74 kg (163 lb)

Sport
- Country: Serbia
- Sport: Cross-country skiing

Rejhan Šmrković (Serbian Cyrillic: Рејхан Шмрковић, born 18 December 1991) is a Serbian cross-country skier. He competed for Serbia at the 2014 Winter Olympics in the cross country skiing events.
