= Kyle Bratrud =

American cross-country skier (born 1993)

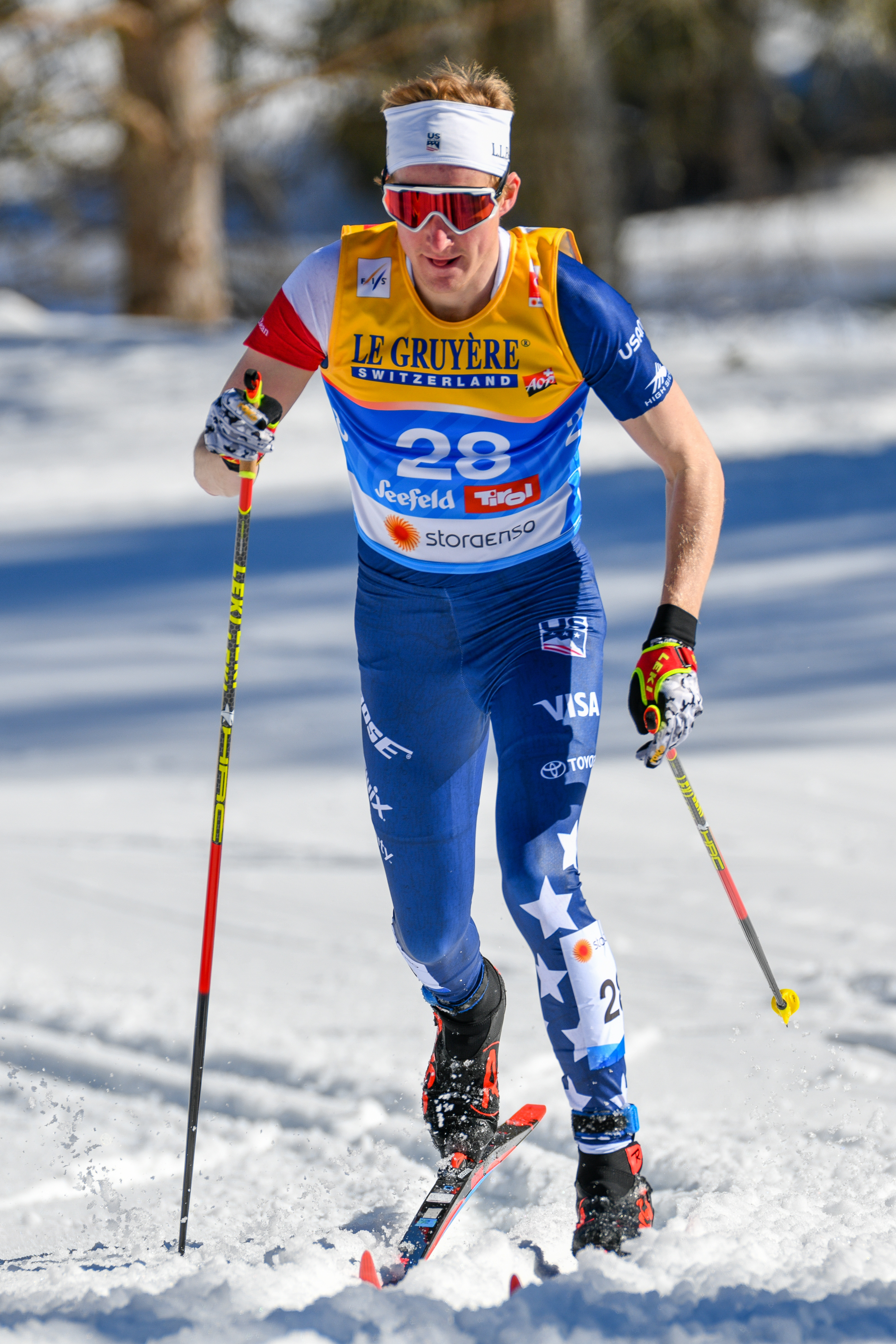
- Bratrud in 2019

Personal information
- Nationality: United States
- Born: February 9, 1993 (age 33) Eden Prairie, Minnesota

Sport
- Sport: Skiing
- Club: Stratton Mountain School

World Cup career
- Seasons: 3 – (2015, 2019–2020)
- Indiv. starts: 8
- Indiv. podiums: 0
- Team starts: 0
- Overall titles: 0 – (132nd in 2019)
- Discipline titles: 0
- Updated on January 15, 2022

Kyle Bratrud (born February 9, 1993) is an American cross-country skier born in Eden Prairie, Minnesota.

He competed at the 2013 World Junior Championships. He made his World Cup debut in February 2015 in Östersund. He collected his first World Cup points in February 2019 in Cogne, finishing 26th in the 15 km race.

He represented the US at the 2015, 2017 and 2019 World Championships. His best placement in an individual event is a 31st place, however in the relay the US team improved steadily from an 11th place in 2015 to a 10th place in 2017 and ninth place in 2019.

== Cross-country skiing results ==
All results are sourced from the International Ski Federation (FIS).

=== World Championships ===
Year	Age	15 km individual	30 km skiathlon	50 km mass start	Sprint	4 × 10 km relay	Team sprint
2015	22	—	—	—	—	—	—
2017	24	—	—	—	—	—	—
2019	26	—	—	—	—	—	—

=== World Cup ===
==== Season standings ====
Season	Age	Discipline standings			Ski Tour standings			
Season	Age	Overall	Distance	Sprint	Nordic Opening	Tour de Ski	Ski Tour 2020	World Cup Final
2015	22	NC	NC	—	—	—	—N/a	—N/a
2019	26	132	93	—	—	—	—N/a	—
2020	27	NC	NC	NC	62	—	—	—N/a
