= Arvis Liepiņš =

Latvian cross-country skier (born 1990)

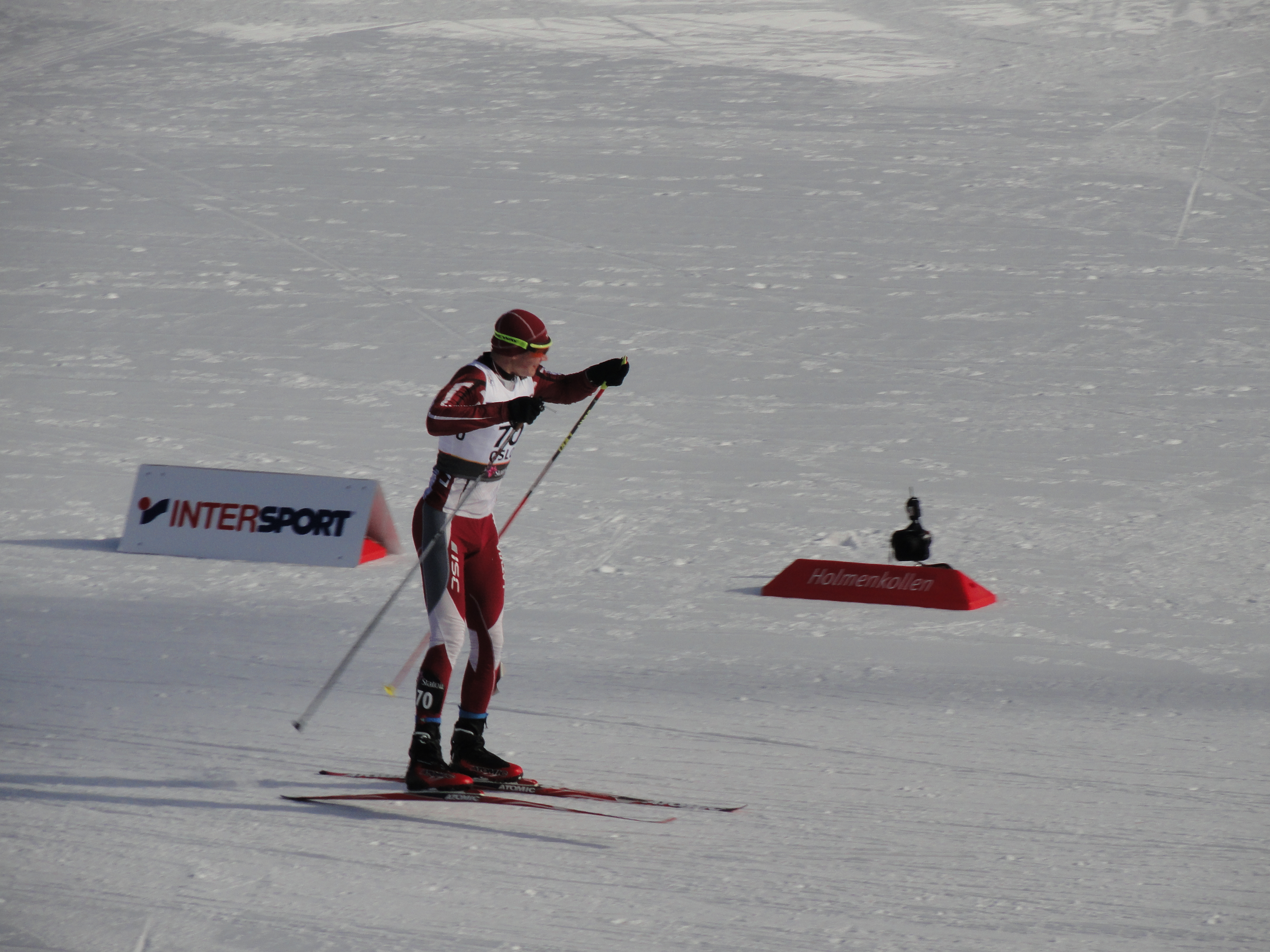

Personal information
- Nationality: Latvian
- Born: 18 March 1990 (age 35); Madona

Sport
- Sport: Cross-country skiing

Arvis Liepiņš (born 18 March 1990) is a Latvian cross-country skier. He competed at the FIS Nordic World Ski Championships 2011 in Oslo, the FIS Nordic World Ski Championships 2013 in Val di Fiemme, and at the 2014 Winter Olympics in Sochi.
