= Reese Hanneman =

American cross-country skier (born 1989)

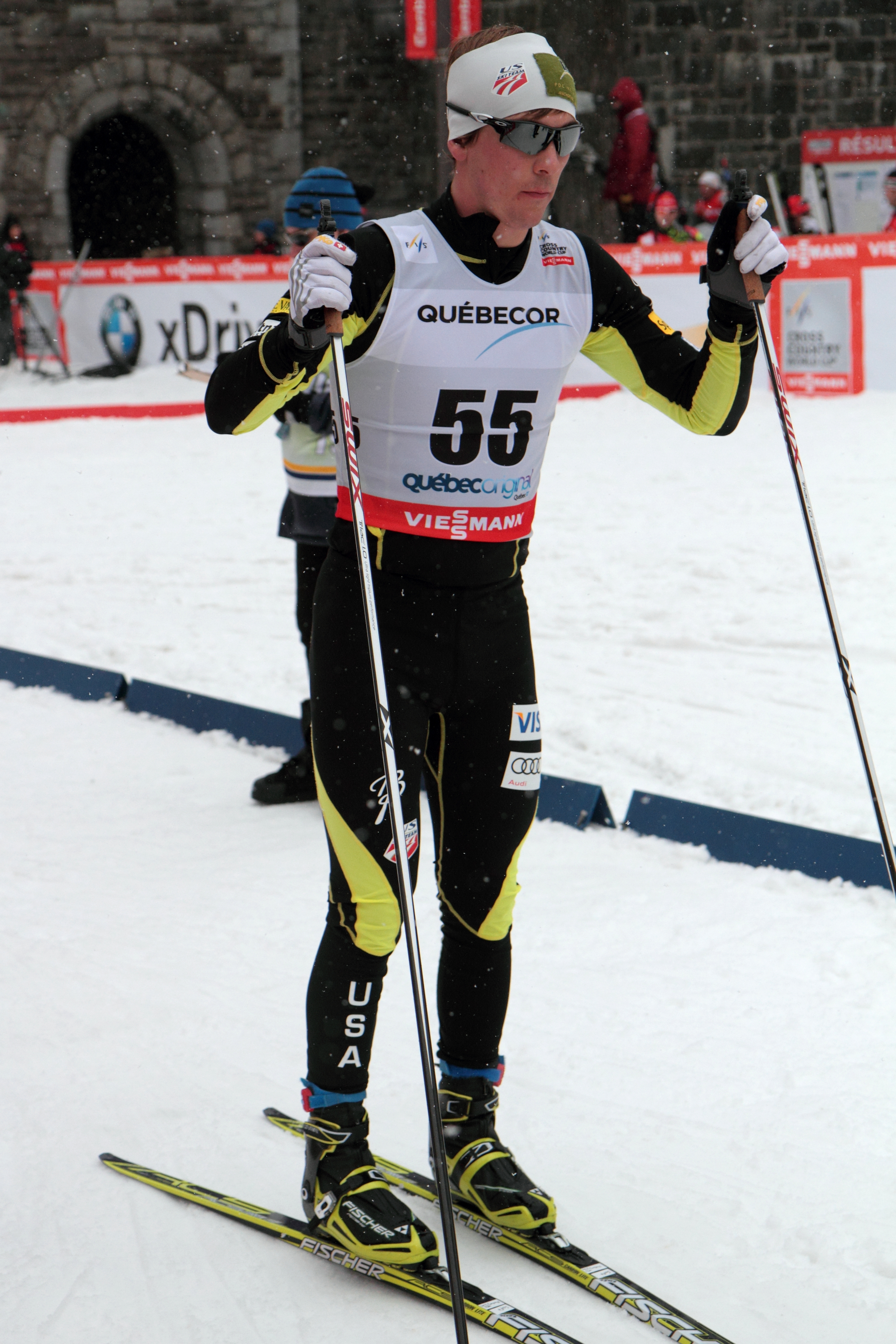
- Hanneman in 2012

Personal information
- Nationality: United States
- Born: December 25, 1989 (age 36) Fairbanks, Alaska, United States

Sport
- Sport: Skiing
- Club: APU Nordic Ski Center

World Cup career
- Seasons: 6 – (2010, 2013–2016, 2018)
- Indiv. starts: 34
- Indiv. podiums: 0
- Team starts: 2
- Team podiums: 0
- Overall titles: 0
- Discipline titles: 0
- Updated on 18 November 2021

Reese Hanneman (born December 25, 1989) is an American cross-country skier. He competed in the 2018 Winter Olympics.

He is a five-time U.S. National Champion, and competed for the United States on the FIS World Cup over six seasons.

== Cross-country skiing results ==
All results are sourced from the International Ski Federation (FIS).

=== Olympic Games ===
Year	Age	15 km individual	30 km skiathlon	50 km mass start	Sprint	4 × 10 km relay	Team sprint
2018	28	—	—	—	—	14	—

=== World Cup ===
==== Season standings ====
Season	Age	Discipline standings			Ski Tour standings			
Season	Age	Overall	Distance	Sprint	Nordic Opening	Tour de Ski	World Cup Final	Ski Tour Canada
2010	20	NC	—	NC	—N/a	—	—	—N/a
2013	23	NC	NC	NC	—	—	—	—N/a
2014	24	NC	NC	NC	—	—	37	—N/a
2015	25	NC	NC	NC	92	—	—N/a	—N/a
2016	26	NC	NC	NC	—	—	—N/a	DNF
2018	28	NC	—	NC	—	—	—	—N/a
