= Jānis Paipals =

Latvian cross-country skier (born 1983)

Jānis Paipals (born 28 September 1983 in Gulbene) is a Latvian cross-country skier who has competed internationally since 2006. He represented Latvia at the 2010 Winter Olympics, where he finished 62nd in the individual sprint, 72nd in the 15 km event, and was lapped during the 15 km + 15 km double pursuit.

At the FIS Nordic World Ski Championships 2009 in Liberec, he placed 67th in the individual sprint and did not finish the 15 km + 15 km double pursuit event.

His best recorded finish was sixth place in a 10 km event held in Latvia in 2007.
