= Jessica Yeaton =

Australian cross-country skier (born 1991)

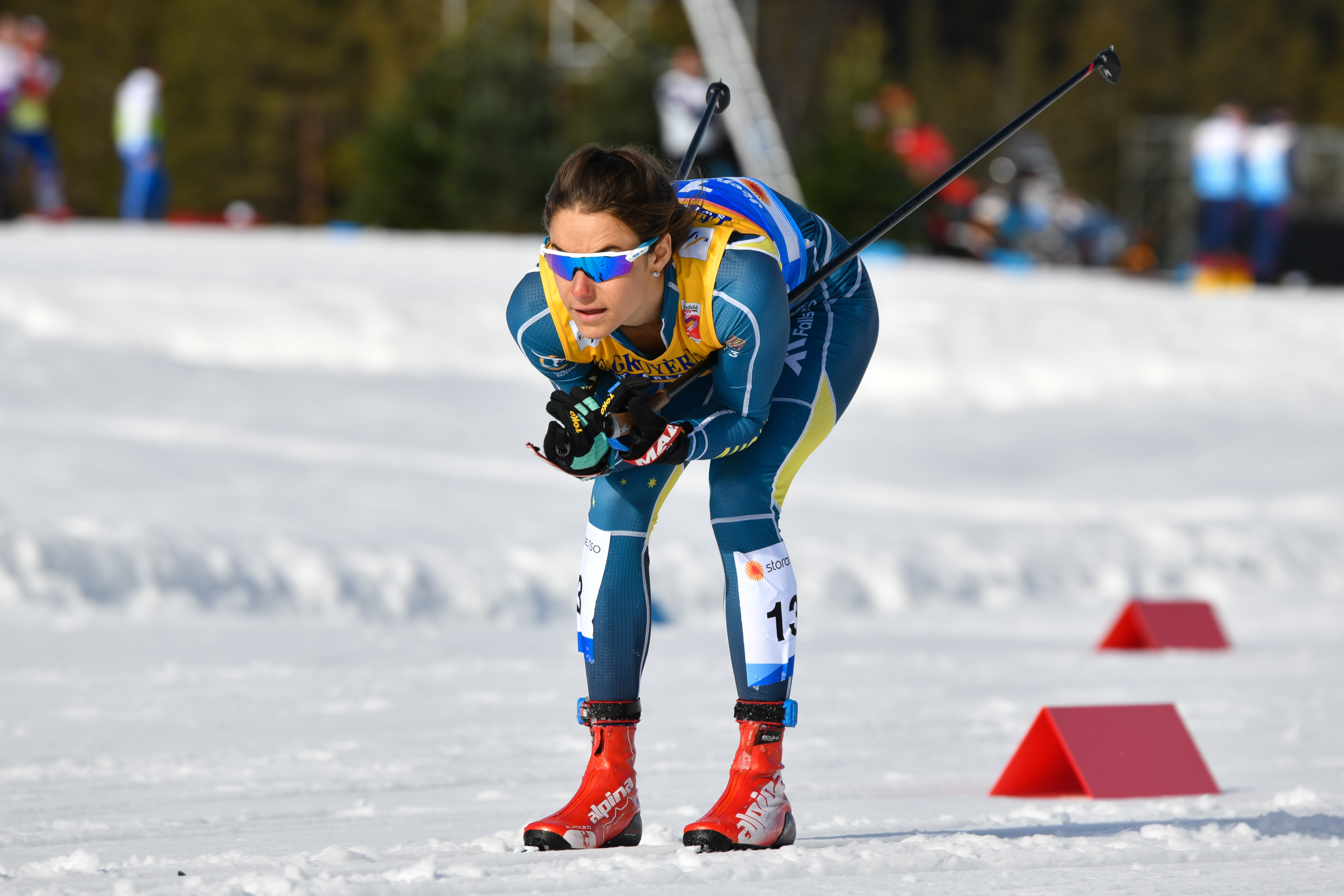
- Jessica Yeaton in February, 2019

Personal information
- Nationality: Australia
- Born: 21 November 1991 (age 34) Perth, Western Australia

Sport
- Sport: Skiing

World Cup career
- Seasons: 7 – (2015–2020, 2022–present)
- Indiv. starts: 50
- Indiv. podiums: 0
- Team starts: 2
- Team podiums: 0
- Overall titles: 0 – (98th in 2022)
- Discipline titles: 0
- Updated on 19 March 2022

Jessica Yeaton (born 21 November 1991) is an Australian cross-country skier who competes internationally.

She competed for Australia at the FIS Nordic World Ski Championships 2017 in Lahti, Finland.

She grew up at various places around the world, like Perth in Western Australia, Texas and Dubai before aged 12 she settled in Alaska, became fascinated by the wintertime activities and began practice cross-country skiing.

== Cross-country skiing results ==
All results are sourced from the International Ski Federation (FIS).

=== Olympic Games ===
| Year | Age | 10 km individual | 15 km skiathlon | 30 km mass start | Sprint | 4 × 5 km relay | Team sprint |
|---|---|---|---|---|---|---|---|
| 2018 | 24 | 41 | 50 | 42 | 48 | — | 12 |
| 2022 | 28 | 51 | 31 | 43 | 52 | — | 16 |

=== World Championships ===
| Year | Age | 10 km individual | 15 km skiathlon | 30 km mass start | Sprint | 4 × 5 km relay | Team sprint |
|---|---|---|---|---|---|---|---|
| 2015 | 23 | 60 | — | — | 50 | 14 | 18 |
| 2017 | 25 | 48 | — | 33 | 45 | 15 | 17 |
| 2019 | 27 | 39 | 22 | 31 | 38 | — | — |

=== World Cup ===
==== Season standings ====
| Season | Age | Discipline standings | | | Ski Tour standings | | | | |
| Season | Age | Overall | Distance | Sprint | Nordic Opening | Tour de Ski | Ski Tour 2020 | World Cup Final | Ski Tour Canada |
|---|---|---|---|---|---|---|---|---|---|
| 2015 | 23 | NC | NC | NC | — | — | —N/a | —N/a | —N/a |
| 2016 | 24 | NC | NC | NC | — | — | —N/a | —N/a | 46 |
| 2017 | 25 | 101 | 80 | 87 | — | — | —N/a | 51 | —N/a |
| 2018 | 26 | NC | NC | NC | — | — | —N/a | — | —N/a |
| 2019 | 27 | 116 | 87 | NC | — | — | —N/a | 53 | —N/a |
| 2020 | 28 | 99 | NC | NC | — | 38 | — | —N/a | —N/a |
| 2022 | 30 | 98 | 84 | NC | —N/a | 42 | —N/a | —N/a | —N/a |
