= Brian Gregg =

American cross-country skier

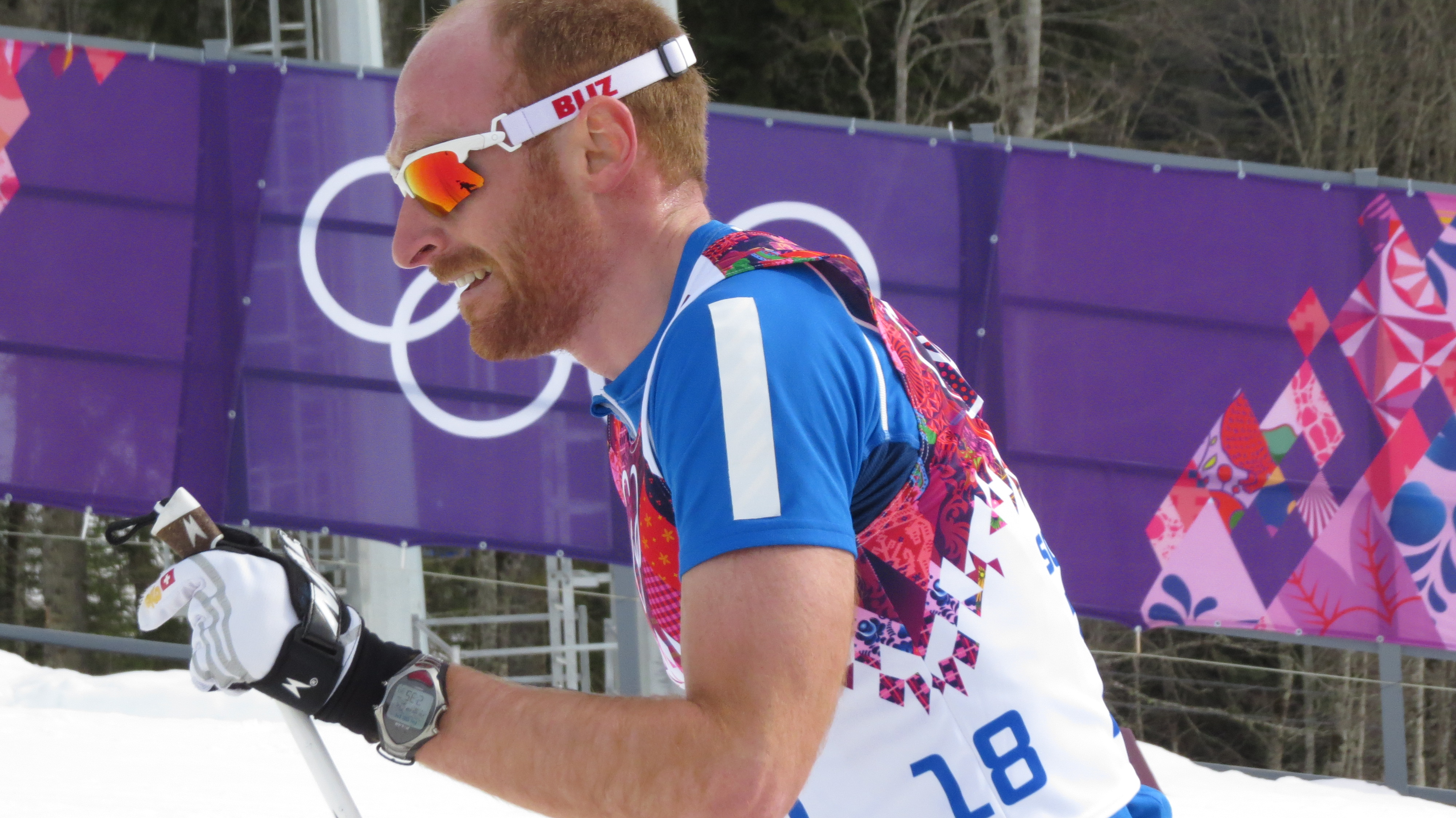
- Gregg at the 2014 Winter Olympics

Personal information
- Born: June 27, 1984 (age 40); Denver, Colorado, U.S.
- Height: 5 ft 8 in (173 cm)
- Weight: 152 lb (69 kg)
- Spouse: Caitlin Compton (m. 2011)

Sport
- Country: United States
- Sport: Cross-country skiing

Brian Gregg (born June 27, 1984) is an American cross-country skier. Gregg competed at the 2014 Winter Olympics in Sochi, Russia.

== Personal life ==
Since May 21, 2011 Brian is married to fellow cross country skier Caitlin Compton.
