= Caitlin Compton Gregg =

American cross-country skier (born 1980)

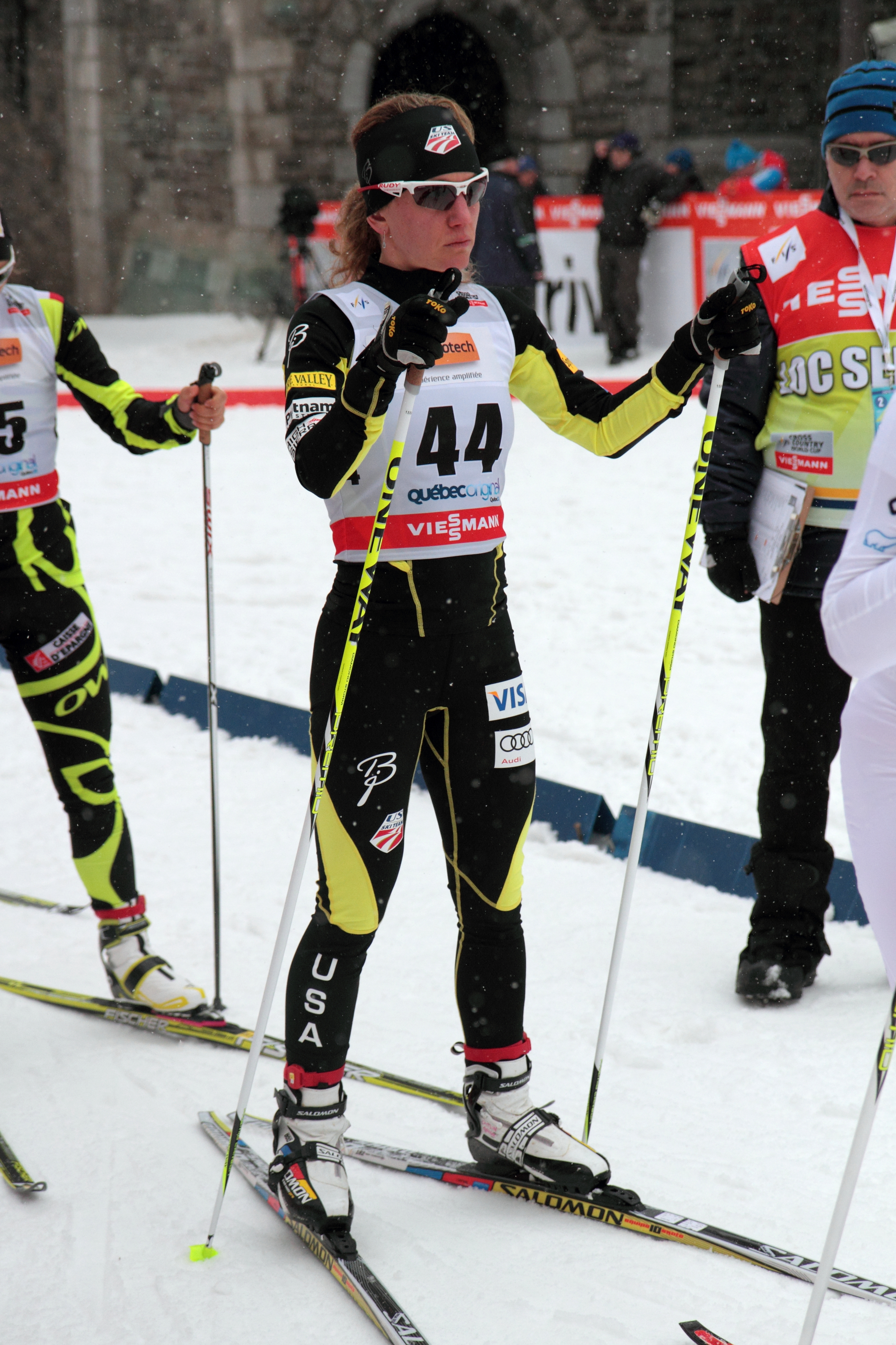

Personal information
- Nationality: United States
- Born: November 7, 1980 (age 45)
- Height: 165 cm (5 ft 5 in)

Sport
- Sport: Skiing
- Club: Loppet Nordic Racing

World Cup career
- Seasons: 6 – (2009–2010, 2013–2016)
- Indiv. starts: 47
- Indiv. podiums: 0
- Team starts: 2
- Team podiums: 0
- Overall titles: 0 – (73rd in 2016)
- Discipline titles: 0
Medal record
Women's cross-country skiing
Representing the United States
World Championships
Bronze medal – third place	2015 Falun	10 km freestyle

Caitlin Compton Gregg (born November 7, 1980) is an American cross-country skier who has competed since 2001.

== Career ==
Gregg starting Nordic skiing at Harwood Union High School in Duxbury, Vermont, as a sophomore.

Her best World Cup finish was 14th in the 10 km Freestyle in Canmore, Alberta in February 2010.

It was announced on January 19, 2010, that she had qualified for the 2010 Winter Olympics. She ended up placing sixth overall in the team sprint along with Kikkan Randall. Gregg's best individual finish was 30th in the 10 km event.

Gregg's best finish at the FIS Nordic World Ski Championships was third in the 10 km freestyle in Falun in 2015. Her second best finish was 14th in the 4 × 5 km relay at Liberec in 2009 while her second best individual finish was 48th in the 30 km mass start event at those same championships.

Gregg was with the only five-time winner, male or female, of the American Birkebeiner ski marathon until Alayna Sonnesyn won her 5th in 2026. They are now tied at 5 wins each. She won the race in 2011, 2013, 2014, 2016, and 2018, skiing the 2016 race with a broken toe. Gregg had had the course record in the women's freestyle technique in 2011 with a winning time of 2:15:26.0, until 2026 when Alayna Sonnesyn skied the course in 2:08:10.

== Cross-country skiing results ==
All results are sourced from the International Ski Federation (FIS).

=== Olympic Games ===
Year	Age	10 km individual	15 km skiathlon	30 km mass start	Sprint	4 × 5 km relay	Team sprint
2010	29	30	42	—	—	11	6

=== World Championships ===
Year	Age	10 km individual	15 km skiathlon	30 km mass start	Sprint	4 × 5 km relay	Team sprint
2007	26	60	—	DNF	—	14	—
2009	28	—	58	47	—	13	—
2015	34	Bronze	—	—	—	—	—
2017	36	—	—	36	—	—	—

=== World Cup ===
==== Season standings ====
Season	Age	Season standings			Ski Tour standings			
Season	Age	Overall	Distance	Sprint	Nordic Opening	Tour de Ski	World Cup Final	Ski Tour Canada
2009	28	NC	NC	—	—N/a	—	—	—N/a
2010	29	94	67	NC	—N/a	—	—	—N/a
2013	32	NC	—	NC	—	—	—	—N/a
2014	33	NC	NC	NC	—	—	37	—N/a
2015	34	99	67	NC	68	—	—N/a	—N/a
2016	35	73	46	NC	68	42	—N/a	33

== Personal life ==
Since May 21, 2011, Caitlin Compton Gregg is married to fellow cross-country skier Brian Gregg.
