= Kris Freeman =

American cross-country skier

Personal information
- Nationality: United States
- Born: October 14, 1980 (age 45) Concord, New Hampshire, United States

Sport
- Sport: Skiing
- Club: Andover Outing Club

World Cup career
- Seasons: 16 – (2001–2016)
- Indiv. starts: 154
- Indiv. podiums: 0
- Team starts: 24
- Team podiums: 0
- Overall titles: 0 – (27th in 2011)
- Discipline titles: 0
Medal record
Men's cross-country skiing
Representing United States
U23 World Championships
Gold medal – first place	2003 Valdidentro	30 km classical
- Updated on 18 November 2021

Kris Freeman (born October 14, 1980 Concord, New Hampshire) is a former professional American cross-country skier. He was a member of the U.S. Ski Team, along with his older brother Justin Freeman.

He competed in the Winter Olympics for the first time in 2002. In March 2003, at the World Championships held in Val di Fiemme, Italy, Freeman placed fourth in the 15 Kilometer Classic. At the U-23 World Championships he placed 1st in the 30 km classic race, skiing away from the field. He was again picked for the U.S. Olympic Team. After several seasons in which, by his own admission, his results did not live up to expectations and the diagnosis of severe compartment syndrome, Freeman duplicated his career best by placing fourth in the 15 km individual-start classic race at the FIS Nordic World Ski Championships 2009 in Liberec, Czech Republic. . Freeman represented the United States at the 2010 Winter Olympics in Vancouver and the 2014 Winter Olympics in Sochi.

== Cross-country skiing results ==
All results are sourced from the International Ski Federation (FIS).

=== Olympic Games ===
Year	Age	15 km	Pursuit	30 km	50 km	Sprint	4 × 10 km relay	Team sprint
2002	21	22	14	—	—	41	5	—N/a
2006	25	21	—	—N/a	61	—	12	—
2010	29	59	45	—N/a	DNF	—	—	—
2014	33	52	53	—N/a	57	—	—	—

=== World Championships ===
Year	Age	15 km	Pursuit	30 km	50 km	Sprint	4 × 10 km relay	Team sprint
2001	20	62	54	50	—	—	13	—N/a
2003	22	4	14	—	—	—	12	—N/a
2005	24	—	50	—N/a	—	—	11	—
2007	26	61	19	—N/a	12	—	—	—
2009	28	4	—	—N/a	—	—	12	11
2011	30	24	29	—N/a	—	58	14	—
2013	32	—	40	—N/a	37	—	10	—
2015	34	59	48	—N/a	DNS	—	—	—

=== World Cup ===
==== Season standings ====
Season	Age	Discipline standings			Ski Tour standings			
Season	Age	Overall	Distance	Sprint	Nordic Opening	Tour de Ski	World Cup Final	Ski Tour Canada
2001	20	107	—N/a	NC	—N/a	—N/a	—N/a	—N/a
2002	21	NC	—N/a	NC	—N/a	—N/a	—N/a	—N/a
2003	22	84	—N/a	NC	—N/a	—N/a	—N/a	—N/a
2004	23	44	27	NC	—N/a	—N/a	—N/a	—N/a
2005	24	79	51	NC	—N/a	—N/a	—N/a	—N/a
2006	25	107	73	—	—N/a	—N/a	—N/a	—N/a
2007	26	56	32	NC	—N/a	—	—N/a	—N/a
2008	27	66	40	NC	—N/a	—	—	—N/a
2009	28	84	51	—	—N/a	—	—	—N/a
2010	29	64	34	NC	—N/a	—	—	—N/a
2011	30	27	22	91	12	28	24	—N/a
2012	31	86	54	NC	43	43	—	—N/a
2013	32	76	50	NC	DNF	44	—	—N/a
2014	33	NC	NC	NC	57	—	—	—N/a
2015	34	NC	NC	—	—	—	—N/a	—N/a
2016	35	NC	NC	NC	73	—	—N/a	—
