= FIS Cross-Country Continental Cup =

The FIS Cross-Country Continental Cup (COC) is a series of second-level competitions in cross-country skiing arranged by the International Ski Federation (FIS) since 1996.

== History ==
The Continental Cup was founded in 1996. Prior to its existence, FIS held separate competitions, FIS races, as the only competitions on the level below the World Cup. In 1990, the International Ski Federation decided to organize an official second-level series of events and from 1996, races were held worldwide according to the FIS rules. After a few years, the competitions were simplified and various individual series were gradually established. Today there are a total of nine series, each spanning one or more nations. In addition to the skiers from the participating nations, there are also regular guest starters from all nations registered within the FIS, which are also included in the rankings, but cannot collect points, for example with exchange students.

== World Cup qualification ==
The Overall winners from the previous season's Continental Cups ar rewarded a right to start in the first World Cup period in the following season. The leaders of all COC, both men and women, at the end of a COC period have the right to start in World Cup competitions during the next World Cup period.

== Continental Cups ==
Cup	Short name	Founded	Nations	Classes
Alpen Cup (or OPA Cup)	OPA	2004	Andorra; Austria; Czech Republic; France; Germany; Italy; Spain; Liechtenstein; Slovenia; Switzerland	Senior & U20
Australia/New Zealand Cup	ANC	2005	Australia; New Zealand	Senior & U20
Balkan Cup	BC	2006	Albania; Bosnia and Herzegovina; Bulgaria; Croatia; Greece; Montenegro; Moldova; North Macedonia; Romania; Serbia; Turkey	Senior & U20
Eastern Europe Cup	EEC	2007	Belarus; Kazakhstan; Russia; Ukraine	Senior & U20
Far East Cup	FEC	2004	China; Iran; Japan; Mongolia; North Korea; South Korea; Chinese Taipei; Uzbekistan	Senior & U20
Nor-Am Cup	NAC	2001	Canada	Senior & U20
Scandinavian Cup	SCAN	2004	Denmark; Estonia; Finland; Iceland; Latvia; Lithuania; Norway; Sweden	Senior & U20
Slavic Cup	SC	2005	Hungary; Poland; Slovakia	Senior & U20
US SuperTour	UST	2001 (COC since 2004)	United States	Senior & U20
