= Chelsea Holmes (skier) =

American cross-country skier (born 1987)

Personal information
- Nationality: United States
- Born: January 20, 1987 (age 39)

Sport
- Sport: Skiing
- Club: APU Ski Team

World Cup career
- Seasons: 4 – (2013, 2016–2018)
- Indiv. starts: 26
- Indiv. podiums: 0
- Team starts: 0
- Overall titles: 0 – (86th in 2016)
- Discipline titles: 0

Chelsea Holmes (born January 20, 1987) is an American cross-country skier who competes internationally.

She competed for U.S. at the FIS Nordic World Ski Championships 2017 in Lahti, Finland.

== Cross-country skiing results ==
All results are sourced from the International Ski Federation (FIS).

=== World Championships ===
Year	Age	10 km individual	15 km skiathlon	30 km mass start	Sprint	4 × 5 km relay	Team sprint
2017	30	—	—	13	—	—	—

=== World Cup ===
==== Season standings ====
Season	Age	Discipline standings			Ski Tour standings			
Season	Age	Overall	Distance	Sprint	Nordic Opening	Tour de Ski	World Cup Final	Ski Tour Canada
2013	26	NC	NC	—	—	—	—	—N/a
2016	29	86	62	NC	—	—	—N/a	31
2017	30	NC	NC	NC	—	—	45	—N/a
2018	31	104	80	NC	60	—	—	—N/a
