= Erik Bjornsen =

American cross-country skier (born 1991)

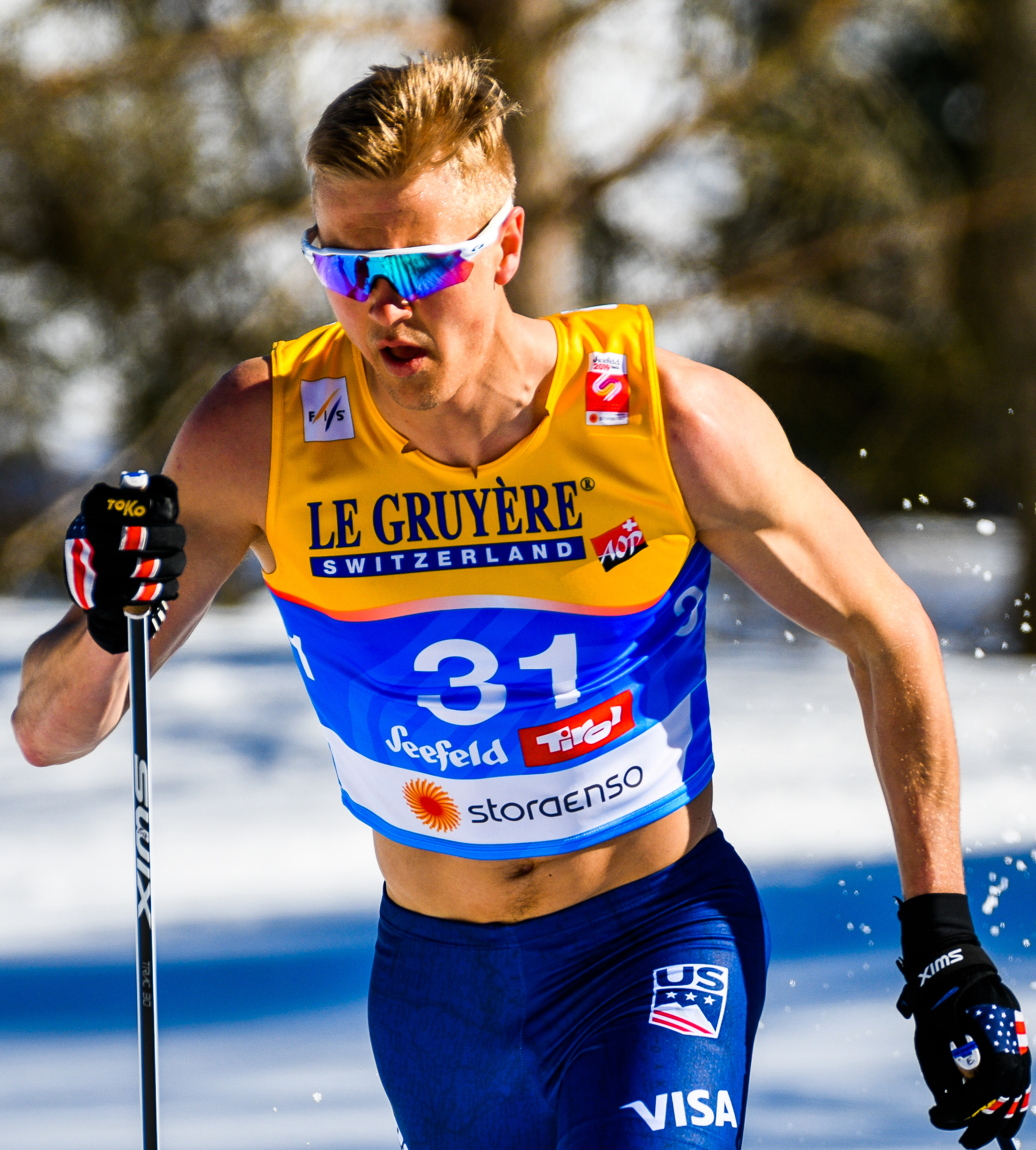
- Bjornsen at the 2019 World Championships

Personal information
- Nationality: United States
- Born: July 14, 1991 (age 35) Winthrop, Washington, U.S.
- Height: 6 ft 2 in (188 cm)

Sport
- Sport: Skiing
- Club: Alaska Pacific University Nordic Ski Center

World Cup career
- Seasons: 8 – (2013–2020)
- Indiv. starts: 126
- Indiv. podiums: 1
- Indiv. wins: 0
- Team starts: 12
- Team podiums: 0
- Overall titles: 0 – (50th in 2018)
- Discipline titles: 0
- Updated on January 15, 2022

Erik Bjornsen (born July 14, 1991) is an American cross-country skier. He competed at the 2014 Winter Olympics in Sochi in the 30 kilometre skiathlon and sprint, and at the 2018 Winter Olympics in PyeongChang, South Korea, in men's 30 km skiathon and 15 km freestyle.

Bjornsen debuted in the World Cup in December 2012. His best result in a World Cup race was third place in a 15 km pursuit race in Lillehammer, Norway in December 2018.

He announced his retirement from cross-country skiing in April 2020.

His sister Sadie Maubet Bjornsen is a former cross-country skier on the United States Ski Team.

== Cross-country skiing results ==
All results are sourced from the International Ski Federation (FIS).

=== Olympic Games ===
Year	Age	15 km individual	30 km skiathlon	50 km mass start	Sprint	4 × 10 km relay	Team sprint
2014	22	38	41	—	39	11	6
2018	26	41	42	—	25	—	6

=== World Championships ===
Year	Age	15 km individual	30 km skiathlon	50 km mass start	Sprint	4 × 10 km relay	Team sprint
2013	21	48	DNS	52	51	—	14
2015	23	47	28	43	—	11	—
2017	25	18	—	—	36	10	5
2019	27	17	—	—	—	9	8

=== World Cup ===
==== Season standings ====
Season	Age	Discipline standings			Ski Tour standings				
Season	Age	Overall	Distance	Sprint	Nordic Opening	Tour de Ski	Ski Tour 2020	World Cup Final	Ski Tour Canada
2014	22	133	85	NC	—	—	—N/a	—	—N/a
2015	23	137	NC	82	39	DNF	—N/a	—N/a	—N/a
2016	24	97	67	65	46	46	—N/a	—N/a	42
2017	25	80	61	80	57	DNF	—N/a	25	—N/a
2018	26	50	38	42	26	DNF	—N/a	38	—N/a
2019	27	52	36	79	32	DNF	—N/a	20	—N/a
2020	28	114	90	NC	25	—	—	—N/a	—N/a

==== Individual podiums ====
- 1 podium – (1 SWC)

No.	Season	Date	Location	Race	Level	Place
1	2018–19	December 2, 2018	Lillehammer, Norway	15 km Pursuit C	Stage World Cup	3rd
