= Peter Mlynár =

Slovak cross-country skier (born 1988)

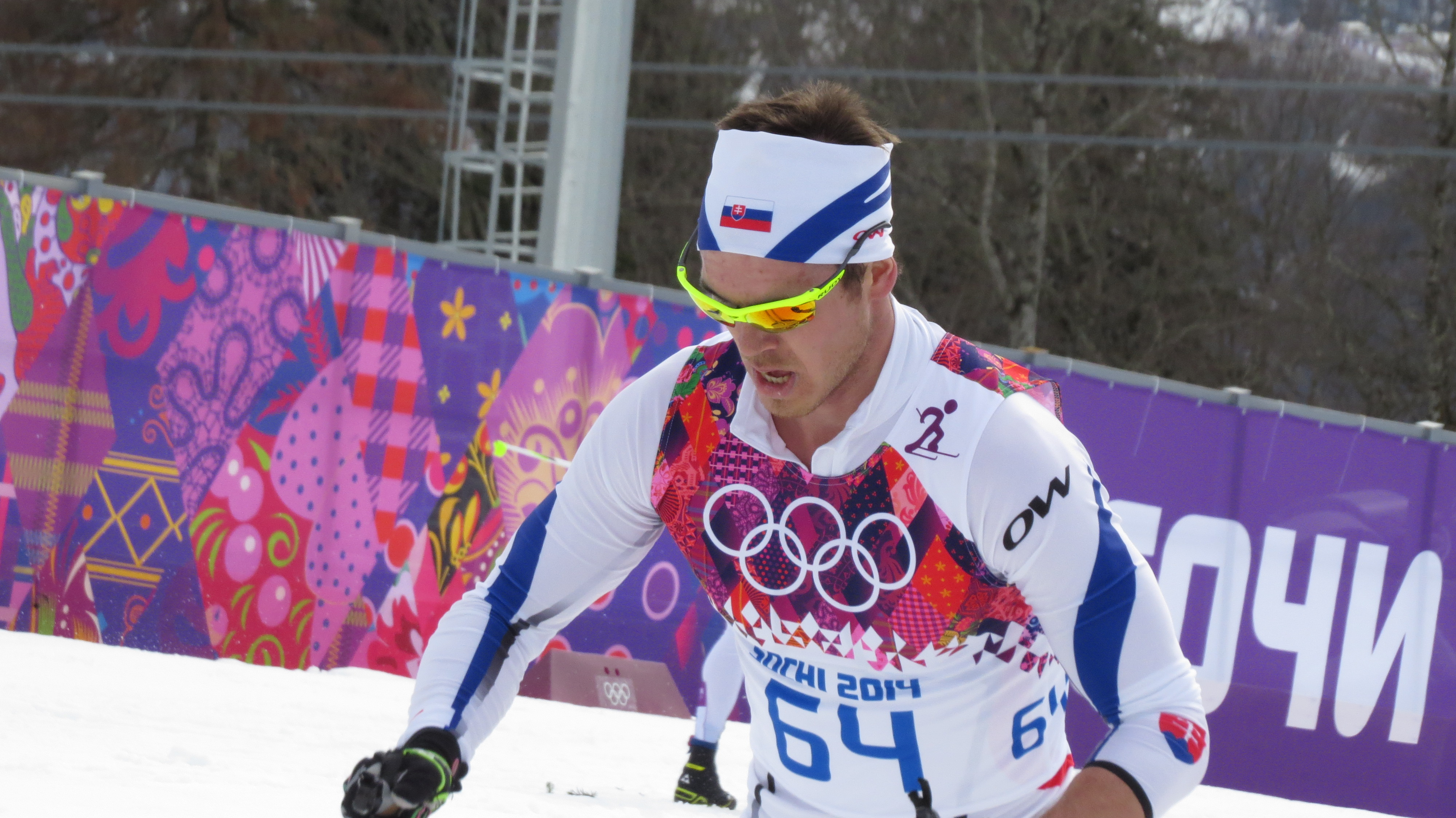
- Mlynár in 2014

Personal information
- Born: 1 March 1988 (age 38) Poprad, Slovakia
- Height: 186 cm (6 ft 1 in)

Sport
- Sport: Skiing

Peter Mlynár (born 1 March 1988 in Poprad) is a Slovak cross-country skier who has been competing since 2007. At the 2010 Winter Olympics in Vancouver, he finished 12th in the 4 x 10 km relay and 57th in the individual sprint event. Mlynár also competed at the 2014 Winter Olympics in Sochi, the 2018 Winter Olympics in Pyeongchang, and the 2022 Winter Olympics in Beijing.

Mlynár's best World Cup finish was 17th in a 4 x 10 km event in Norway in 2009, while his best individual finish was 47th in an individual sprint event in Finland that same year.
