= Kevin Bolger =

American cross-country skier (born 1993)

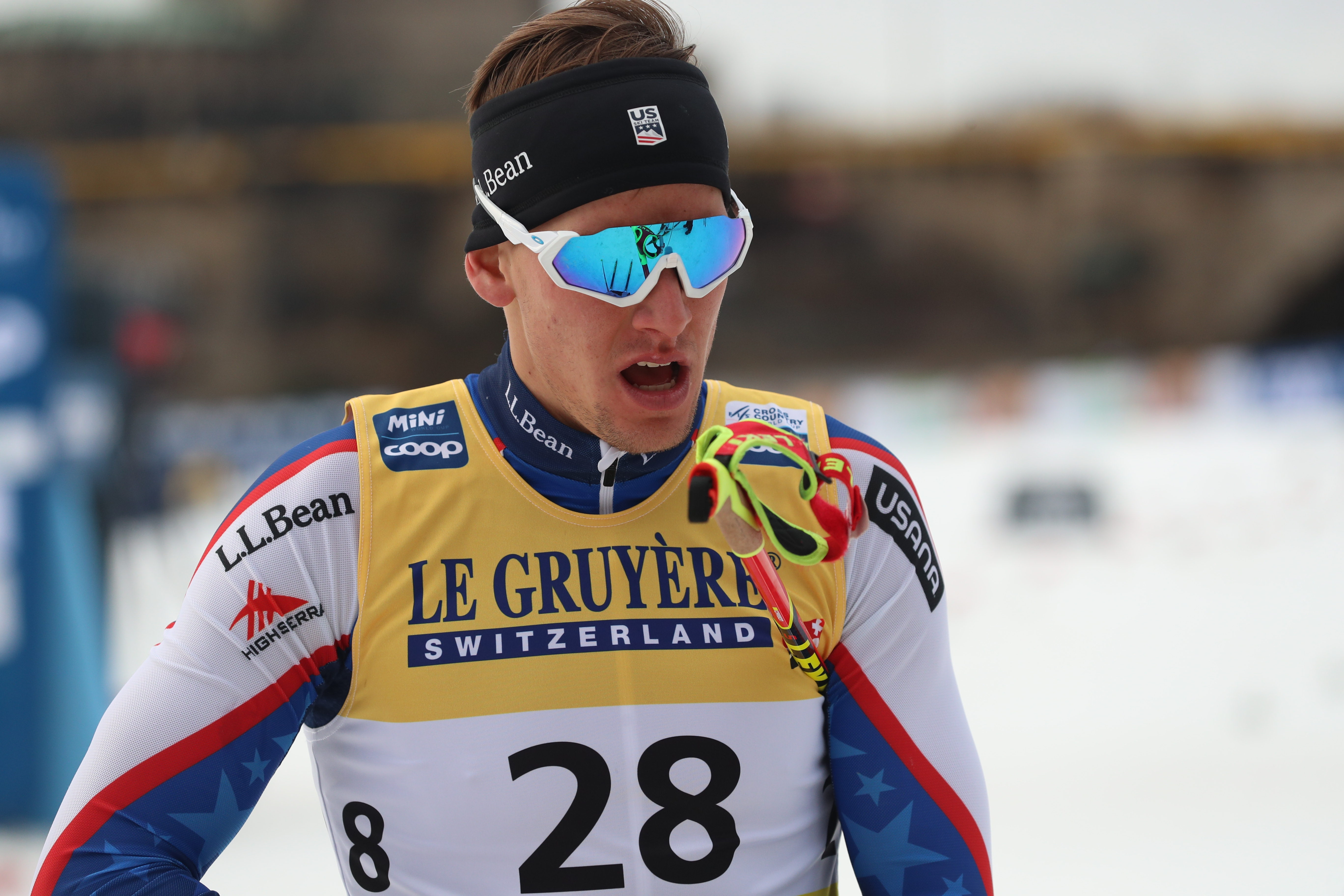
- Bolger in 2019

Personal information
- Nationality: United States
- Born: April 11, 1993 (age 33) Minocqua, Wisconsin, U.S.

Sport
- Sport: Skiing
- Club: Sun Valley Ski Education Foundation

World Cup career
- Seasons: 6 – (2018–present)
- Indiv. starts: 92
- Indiv. podiums: 0
- Team starts: 13
- Team podiums: 0
- Overall titles: 0 – (52nd in 2021)
- Discipline titles: 0
- Updated on March 29, 2023

Kevin Bolger (born April 11, 1993) is an American cross-country skier. He competed in the sprint at the 2022 Winter Olympics, the first time four male American skiers have qualified. He competed collegiately for the University of Utah where he was named to the 2016 NCAA Skiing All-Americans Second Team.

== Cross-country skiing results ==
All results are sourced from the International Ski Federation (FIS).

=== Olympic Games ===
Year	Age	15 km individual	30 km skiathlon	50 km mass start	Sprint	4 × 10 km relay	Team sprint
2022	28	—	—	—^{[a]}	17	9	—

^{a} Distance reduced to 30 km due to weather conditions.

=== World Championships ===
Year	Age	15 km individual	skiathlon	50 km mass start	Sprint	relay	Team sprint
2019	25	—	—	—	18	—	—
2021	27	—	—	—	35	—	—
2023	29	—	—	—	44	—	—
2025	31		31	22		7	

=== World Cup ===
==== Season standings ====
Season	Age	Discipline standings			Ski Tour standings			
Season	Age	Overall	Distance	Sprint	Nordic Opening	Tour de Ski	Ski Tour 2020	World Cup Final
2018	24	102	NC	50	—	—	—N/a	60
2019	25	112	NC	60	59	DNF	—N/a	44
2020	26	87	NC	51	66	DNF	DNF	—N/a
2021	27	52	NC	16	63	48	—N/a	—N/a
2022	28	75	99	41	—N/a	DNF	—N/a	—N/a
2023	29	90	NC	40	—N/a	DNF	—N/a	—N/a
