= Rosie Frankowski =

American cross-country skier (born 1991)

Personal information
- Nationality: United States
- Born: July 30, 1991 (age 34) Minneapolis, Minnesota, United States

Sport
- Sport: Skiing
- Club: APU Ski Team

World Cup career
- Seasons: 4 – (2018–2020, 2022–present)
- Indiv. starts: 24
- Indiv. podiums: 0
- Team starts: 1
- Team podiums: 0
- Overall titles: 0 – (98th in 2020)
- Discipline titles: 0
- Updated on 13 March 2022

Rosie Frankowski (born July 30, 1991) is an American cross-country skier who competes internationally.

She represented the United States at the 2018 Winter Olympics.

== Cross-country skiing results ==
All results are sourced from the International Ski Federation (FIS).

=== Olympic Games ===
Year	Age	10 km individual	15 km skiathlon	30 km mass start	Sprint	4 × 5 km relay	Team sprint
2018	26	—	—	21	—	—	—

=== World Championships ===
Year	Age	10 km individual	15 km skiathlon	30 km mass start	Sprint	4 × 5 km relay	Team sprint
2019	27	—	24	—	—	—	—

=== World Cup ===
==== Season standings ====
Season	Age	Discipline standings			Ski Tour standings			
Season	Age	Overall	Distance	Sprint	Nordic Opening	Tour de Ski	Ski Tour 2020	World Cup Final
2018	26	NC	NC	NC	—	—	—N/a	46
2019	27	NC	NC	NC	—	—	—N/a	56
2020	28	98	68	NC	56	—	43	—N/a
2022	30	NC	NC	—	—N/a	—	—N/a	—N/a
