= Caitlin Patterson =

American cross-country skier (born 1990)

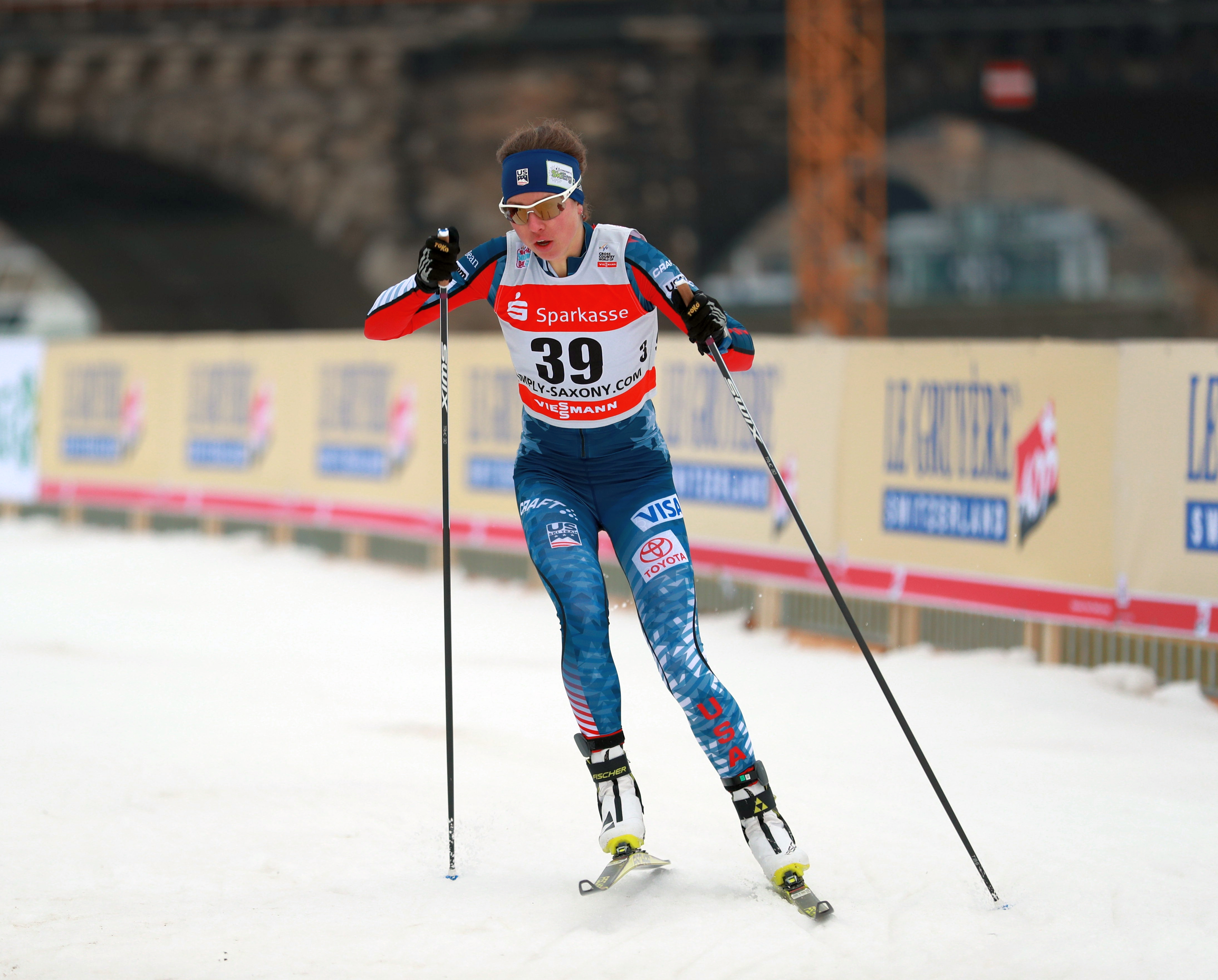
- Caitlin Patterson during World Cup competitions in Dresden, Germany in January 2018

Personal information
- Nationality: United States
- Born: January 30, 1990 (age 36) McCall, Idaho, United States

Sport
- Sport: Skiing
- Club: Craftsbury Nordic Ski Club

World Cup career
- Seasons: 9 – (2013, 2015–2022)
- Indiv. starts: 89
- Indiv. podiums: 0
- Team starts: 7
- Team podiums: 0
- Overall titles: 0 – (63rd in 2017)
- Discipline titles: 0
- Updated on 16 March 2022

Caitlin Patterson (born January 30, 1990) is an American cross-country skier. Patterson was selected and competed for the United States in the 2018 Winter Olympics in Pyeongchang, South Korea

== Early life and education ==
Caitlin Patterson was born in McCall, Idaho. She has one younger brother, Scott, who is also a cross-country skier. The family moved to Alaska in 2005. She attended South Anchorage High School in Anchorage, Alaska. She graduated from University of Vermont with a degree in civil engineering in 2012.

== Career ==
Patterson won all four national titles at the 2018 U.S. National Cross Country Championships. Patterson has been selected to compete for the United States at the 2018 Winter Olympics in Pyeongchang. Her brother Scott was also named to the U.S. Olympic team for Pyeongchang.

== Cross-country skiing results ==
All results are sourced from the International Ski Federation (FIS).

=== Olympic Games ===
Year	Age	10 km individual	15 km skiathlon	30 km mass start	Sprint	4 × 5 km relay	Team sprint
2018	28	—	34	26	—	—	—

=== World Championships ===
Year	Age	10 km individual	15 km skiathlon	30 km mass start	Sprint	4 × 5 km relay	Team sprint
2019	29	—	34	34	—	—	—

=== World Cup ===
==== Season standings ====
Season	Age	Discipline standings			Ski Tour standings				
Season	Age	Overall	Distance	Sprint	Nordic Opening	Tour de Ski	Ski Tour 2020	World Cup Final	Ski Tour Canada
2013	23	NC	NC	NC	—	—	—N/a	—	—N/a
2015	25	NC	NC	NC	—	—	—N/a	—N/a	—N/a
2016	26	95	69	NC	—	—	—N/a	—N/a	—
2017	27	63	43	80	42	—	—N/a	43	—N/a
2018	28	80	56	NC	—	—	—N/a	35	—N/a
2019	29	102	71	NC	34	—	—N/a	46	—N/a
2020	30	119	85	NC	52	—	36	—N/a	—N/a
2021	31	66	52	NC	46	34	—N/a	—N/a	—N/a
2022	32	122	93	—	—N/a	—	—N/a	—N/a	—N/a
