= 2016–17 Scandinavian Cup =

Cross-country skiing competition

Discipline	Men	Women
Overall	(Norway) Håvard Solås Taugbøl	(Sweden) Anna Dyvik

Stage events
Mini-tour	(Norway) Mathias Rundgreen	(Sweden) Linn Sömskar

Competition
Locations	3 venues	3 venues
Individual	8 events	8 events
Cancelled	1 event	1 event

The 2016–17 Scandinavian Cup was a season of the Scandinavian Cup, a Continental Cup season in cross-country skiing for men and women. The season began on 9 December 2016 in Lillehammer, Norway and concluded with a stage event 3–5 March 2017 in Madona, Latvia.

== Calendar ==
=== Men ===
Key: C – Classic / F – Freestyle
Period	Race	Date	Place	Discipline	Winner	Second	Third	Ref.
I	1	9 December 2016	(Norway) Lillehammer	Sprint C	(Norway) Sindre Odberg Palm	(Norway) Håvard Solås Taugbøl	(Norway) Mattis Stenshagen	
I	2	10 December 2016	(Norway) Lillehammer	10 km F	(Norway) Daniel Stock	(Norway) Tord Asle Gjerdalen	(Norway) Joachim Aurland	
I	3	11 December 2016	(Norway) Lillehammer	30 km C Mass Start	(Norway) Niklas Dyrhaug	(Norway) Tord Asle Gjerdalen	(Norway) Mathias Rundgreen	
II	4	7 January 2017	(Finland) Lahti	Sprint F	(Sweden) Oskar Svensson	(Sweden) Karl-Johan Westberg	(Norway) Sindre Bjørnestad Skar	
II	5	8 January 2017	(Finland) Lahti	15 km C	(Finland) Iivo Niskanen	(Norway) Johannes Høsflot Klæbo	(Norway) Mattis Stenshagen	
II		8 January 2017	(Finland) Lahti	30 km Skiathlon	Cancelled			
III	6	3 March 2017	(Latvia) Madona	Sprint F	(Norway) Håvard Solås Taugbøl	(Norway) Tomas Northug	(Norway) Vegard Bjerkreim Nilsen	
III	7	4 March 2017	(Latvia) Madona	10 km C	(Norway) Daniel Stock	(Norway) Magnus Stensås	(Norway) Mathias Rundgreen	
III	8	5 March 2017	(Latvia) Madona	15 km F Pursuit	(Norway) Mathias Rundgreen	(Norway) Håvard Solås Taugbøl	(Sweden) Simon Lageson	
III	Mini-tour Overall (3–5 March 2017)				(Norway) Mathias Rundgreen	(Norway) Håvard Solås Taugbøl	(Norway) Magnus Stensås	

=== Women ===
Key: C – Classic / F – Freestyle
Period	Race	Date	Place	Discipline	Winner	Second	Third	Ref.
I	1	9 December 2016	(Norway) Lillehammer	Sprint C	(Sweden) Anna Dyvik	(Norway) Lotta Udnes Weng	(Norway) Kari Vikhagen Gjeitnes	
I	2	10 December 2016	(Norway) Lillehammer	5 km F	(Sweden) Charlotte Kalla	(Sweden) Ebba Andersson	(Norway) Lotta Udnes Weng	
I	3	11 December 2016	(Norway) Lillehammer	15 km C Mass Start	(Sweden) Charlotte Kalla	(Norway) Kathrine Harsem	(Sweden) Ebba Andersson	
II	4	7 January 2017	(Finland) Lahti	Sprint F	(Sweden) Hanna Falk	(Sweden) Anna Dyvik	(Norway) Marthe Kristoffersen	
II	5	8 January 2017	(Finland) Lahti	10 km C	(Poland) Justyna Kowalczyk	(Sweden) Hanna Falk	(Sweden) Anna Dyvik	
II	6	8 January 2017	(Finland) Lahti	15 km Skiathlon	Cancelled			
III	6	3 March 2017	(Latvia) Madona	Sprint F	(Sweden) Anna Dyvik	(Sweden) Maria Nordström	(Norway) Lotta Udnes Weng	
III	7	4 March 2017	(Latvia) Madona	5 km C	(Sweden) Maria Nordström	(Sweden) Sofia Henriksson	(Sweden) Linn Sömskar	
III	8	5 March 2017	(Latvia) Madona	10 km F Pursuit	(Norway) Tiril Udnes Weng	(Sweden) Jennie Öberg	(Sweden) Linn Sömskar	
III	Mini-tour Overall (3–5 March 2017)				(Sweden) Linn Sömskar	(Sweden) Maria Nordström	(Sweden) Anna Dyvik	

== Overall standings ==
=== Men's overall standings ===
Rank		Points
1	(Norway) Håvard Solås Taugbøl	357
2	(Norway) Daniel Stock	336
3	(Norway) Mathias Rundgreen	310
4	(Norway) Mattis Stenshagen	174
5	(Norway) Magnus Stensås	164
6	(Norway) Tord Asle Gjerdalen	160
7	(Norway) Espen Udjus Frorud	153
8	(Norway) Niklas Dyrhaug	151
9	(Norway) Emil Nyeng	148
10	(Norway) Vegard Bjerkreim Nilsen	137

=== Women's overall standings ===
Rank		Points
1	(Sweden) Anna Dyvik	472
2	(Norway) Tiril Udnes Weng	316
3	(Sweden) Lotta Udnes Weng	308
4	(Sweden) Maria Nordström	239
5	(Norway) Thea Krokan Murud	210
6	(Norway) Lovise Heimdal	200
	(Sweden) Charlotte Kalla	200
8	(Sweden) Elin Mohlin	194
9	(Norway) Kari Vikhagen Gjeitnes	191
10	(Sweden) Sofia Henriksson	190
