= 2008 Nordic Junior World Ski Championships =

International skiing competition

FIS Nordic Junior and U23 World Ski Championships 2008
- Host city: Mals, Italy; Zakopane, Poland
- Events: 20
- Opening: 23 February
- Closing: 29 February

The FIS Nordic Junior and U23 World Ski Championships 2008 took place in Mals, Italy and Zakopane, Poland from 23 February to 29 February 2008. It was the 31st Junior World Championships and the 3rd Under-23 World Championships in Nordic skiing.

== Medal summary ==
=== Junior events ===
==== Cross-country skiing ====
Event	Gold		Silver		Bronze	
Men's Junior Events
Men's junior sprint free	Calle Halfvarsson; Sweden		Jesper Modin; Sweden		Raul Shakirzianov; Russia	
Men's junior 10 kilometre classic	Hans Christer Holund; Norway	28:50.3	Alex Harvey; Canada	28:58.5	Tim Tscharnke; Germany	29:09.5
Men's junior 20 kilometre free mass start	Philipp Marschall; Germany	48:29.6	Petr Sedov; Russia	48:30.1	Andrey Gridin; Kazakhstan	48:30.1
Men's junior 4 × 5 km relay	Russia; Andrey Feller; Petr Sedov; Evgeniy Garanichev; Raul Shakirzianov	59:06.1	Germany; Hannes Dotzler; Thomas Bing; Philipp Marschall; Tim Tscharnke	59:06.3	Kazakhstan; Gennadiy Matviyenko; Vitaly Alexandrov; Andrey Gridin; Mark Starostin	59:41.8
Ladies' Junior Events
Ladies' junior sprint free	Laure Barthélémy; France		Aurelie Dabudyk; France		Lucia Anger; Germany	
Ladies' junior 5 kilometre classic	Therese Johaug; Norway	14:54.0	Ingvild Flugstad Østberg; Norway	14:58.5	Lucia Anger; Germany	15:05.5
Ladies' junior 10 kilometre free mass start	Therese Johaug; Norway	25:24.7	Laure Barthélémy; France	25:28.7	Lisa Larsen; Sweden	25:29.2
Ladies' junior 4 × 3.33 km relay	Norway; Celine Brun-Lie; Therese Johaug; Ingvild Flugstad Østberg; Marthe Kristoffersen	41:50.1	Sweden; Hanna Brodin; Therese Svensson; Lisa Larsen; Hanna Falk	41:51.1	Finland; Johanna Heinanen; Kerttu Niskanen; Satu Annila; Krista Lähteenmäki	41:54.1

==== Nordic Combined ====
Event	Gold		Silver		Bronze	
Normal hill/5 km	Alessandro Pittin; Italy	31:37.9	Tomaz Druml; Austria	32:41.5	Janne Ryynänen; Finland	33:36.9
Normal hill/10 km	Alessandro Pittin; Italy	28:31.7	Johannes Rydzek; Germany	29:37.6	Ole Christian Wendel; Norway	29:52.4
Team normal hill/4 × 5 km	Germany; Wolfgang Bösl; Markus Förster; Andreas Günter; Stefan Tuss	59:32.9	Austria; Dominik Dier; Johannes Weiss; Robert Hauser; Tomaz Druml	1:00:03.1	Norway; Ole Christian Wendel; Truls Sønstehagen Johansen; Per Sannes Heger; Ole Martin Storlien	1:01:09.2

==== Ski jumping ====
Event	Gold		Silver		Bronze	
Men's Junior Events
Men's junior individual normal hill	Andreas Wank; Germany	251.5	Shohhei Tochimoto; Japan	249.5	Andreas Strolz; Austria	246.0
Men's junior team normal hill	Austria; Thomas Thurnbichler; Michael Hayböck; Florian Schabereiter; Lukas Müller	981.5	Germany; Tobias Bogner; Felix Schoft; Danny Queck; Pascal Bodmer	978.5	Poland; Andrzej Zapotoczny; Jakub Kot; Grzegorz Mietus; Maciej Kot	937.0
Ladies' Junior Events
Ladies' junior individual normal hill	Jacqueline Seifriedsberger; Austria	227.0	Elena Runggaldier; Italy	225.5	Katja Pozun; Slovenia	222.5

=== Under-23 events ===
==== Cross-country skiing ====
Event	Gold		Silver		Bronze	
Men's Under-23 Events
Men's under-23 sprint free	Robin Bryntesson; Sweden		Cyril Miranda; France		Nikolay Morilov; Russia	
Men's under-23 15 kilometre classic	Martin Jakš; Czech Republic	42:10.2	Alexey Poltoranin; Kazakhstan	42:42.5	Petter Eliassen; Norway	43:15.4
Men's under-23 30 kilometre free mass start	Dario Cologna; Switzerland	1:07:22.6	Ilia Chernousov; Russia	1:07:23.4	Maurice Manificat; France	1:07:25.2
Ladies' Under-23 Events
Ladies' under-23 sprint free	Vesna Fabjan; Slovenia		Ida Ingemarsdotter; Sweden		Mari Laukkanen; Finland	
Ladies' under-23 10 kilometre classic	Olga Tiagai; Russia	29:41.6	Aurore Cuinet; France	29:53.5	Silja Tarvonen; Finland	30:18.9
Ladies' under-23 15 kilometre free mass start	Olga Tiagai; Russia	37:03.4	Silja Tarvonen; Finland	37:24.2	Elizabeth Stephen; United States	37:25.1

=== Medal table ===
==== All events ====
Rank	Nation	Gold	Silver	Bronze	Total
1	Germany (GER)	4	1	3	8
2	Norway (NOR)	4	1	2	7
3	Russia (RUS)	3	2	2	7
4	Austria (AUT)	2	3	1	6
4	Sweden (SWE)	2	3	1	6
6	France (FRA)	1	4	1	6
7	Italy (ITA)	1	1	1	3
8	Switzerland (SUI)	1	1	0	2
9	Slovenia (SLO)	1	0	1	2
10	Czech Republic (CZE)	1	0	0	1
11	Finland (FIN)	0	1	4	5
12	Kazakhstan (KAZ)	0	1	2	3
13	Canada (CAN)	0	1	0	1
13	Japan (JPN)	0	1	0	1
15	Poland (POL)	0	0	1	1
15	United States (USA)	0	0	1	1
Totals (16 entries)		20	20	20	60

==== Junior events ====
Rank	Nation	Gold	Silver	Bronze	Total
1	Germany (GER)	4	1	3	8
2	Norway (NOR)	4	1	1	6
3	Austria (AUT)	2	3	1	6
4	Sweden (SWE)	1	2	1	4
5	France (FRA)	1	2	0	3
6	Italy (ITA)	1	1	1	3
6	Russia (RUS)	1	1	1	3
8	Canada (CAN)	0	1	0	1
8	Japan (JPN)	0	1	0	1
8	Switzerland (SUI)	0	1	0	1
11	Finland (FIN)	0	0	2	2
11	Kazakhstan (KAZ)	0	0	2	2
13	Poland (POL)	0	0	1	1
13	Slovenia (SLO)	0	0	1	1
Totals (14 entries)		14	14	14	42

==== Under-23 events ====
* Host nation (Italy)

Rank	Nation	Gold	Silver	Bronze	Total
1	Russia (RUS)	2	1	1	4
2	Sweden (SWE)	1	1	0	2
3	Czech Republic (CZE)	1	0	0	1
3	Slovenia (SLO)	1	0	0	1
3	Switzerland (SUI)	1	0	0	1
6	France (FRA)	0	2	1	3
7	Finland (FIN)	0	1	2	3
8	Kazakhstan (KAZ)	0	1	0	1
9	Norway (NOR)	0	0	1	1
9	United States (USA)	0	0	1	1
Totals (10 entries)		6	6	6	18
