= Bosl =

Bosl or Bösl is a surname. Notable people with the surname include:

- George Bosl (born 1948), American cancer researcher
- Heinz Bosl (1946–1975), German ballet dancer
- Wolfgang Bösl (born 1989), German Nordic combined skier

== See also ==
- Bose (surname)
