= Tim Tscharnke =

German cross-country skier (born 1989)

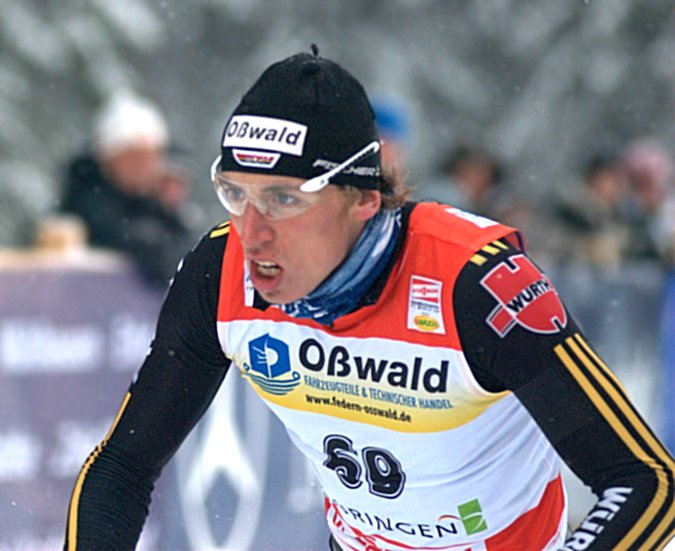
- Tim Tscharnke in 2010

Personal information
- Nationality: Germany
- Born: 13 December 1989 (age 36) Weissenfels, East Germany

Sport
- Sport: Skiing
- Club: SV Biberau

World Cup career
- Seasons: 9 – (2009–2017)
- Indiv. starts: 116
- Indiv. podiums: 2
- Indiv. wins: 2
- Team starts: 15
- Team podiums: 2
- Team wins: 0
- Overall titles: 0 – (22nd in 2013)
- Discipline titles: 0
Medal record
Men's cross-country skiing
Representing Germany
Olympic Games
Silver medal – second place	2010 Vancouver	Team sprint
Junior World Championships
Silver medal – second place	2008 Mals	4 × 5 km relay
Silver medal – second place	2009 Praz de Lys-Sommand	4 × 5 km relay
Bronze medal – third place	2008 Mals	10 km classical

Tim Tscharnke (born 13 December 1989 in Weissenfels) is a former cross-country skier from Germany, who competed between and 2017. He has two victories in the World Cup, his first in the 2012-2013 season in Canmore and his second during the 2015 Tour de Ski in Val di Fiemme. His club is SV Biberau. He speaks German, Russian, and English.

He won silver with Axel Teichmann in the Team Sprint at the 2010 Winter Olympics in Vancouver.

== Cross-country skiing results ==
All results are sourced from the International Ski Federation (FIS).

=== Olympic Games ===
- 1 medal – (1 silver)

Year	Age	15 km individual	30 km skiathlon	50 km mass start	Sprint	4 × 10 km relay	Team sprint
2010	20	—	—	—	33	—	Silver
2014	24	26	—	—	20	—	7

=== World Championships ===
Year	Age	15 km individual	30 km skiathlon	50 km mass start	Sprint	4 × 10 km relay	Team sprint
2011	21	—	—	34	29	—	4
2013	23	14	—	—	29	7	9
2015	25	—	—	DNF	28	7	4

=== World Cup ===
==== Season standings ====
Season	Age	Discipline standings			Ski Tour standings			
Season	Age	Overall	Distance	Sprint	Nordic Opening	Tour de Ski	World Cup Final	Ski Tour Canada
2009	19	NC	NC	—	—N/a	DNF	—	—N/a
2010	20	59	67	34	—N/a	DNF	—	—N/a
2011	21	52	37	100	16	DNF	—	—N/a
2012	22	29	24	60	—	17	18	—N/a
2013	23	22	25	19	20	—	14	—N/a
2014	24	31	33	19	24	DNF	26	—N/a
2015	25	55	47	98	36	20	—N/a	—N/a
2016	26	NC	NC	—	—	—	—N/a	—
2017	27	132	91	NC	—	DNF	—	—N/a

==== Individual podiums ====
- 2 victories – (1 WC, 1 SWC)
- 2 podiums – (1 WC, 1 SWC)

No.	Season	Date	Location	Race	Level	Place
1	2012–13	13 December 2012	Canmore, Canada	15 km Mass Start C	World Cup	1st
2	2014–15	10 January 2015	Val di Fiemme, Italy	15 km Mass Start C	Stage World Cup	1st

==== Team podiums ====
- 2 podiums – (1 RL, 1 TS)

No.	Season	Date	Location	Race	Level	Place	Teammate(s)
1	2009–10	24 January 2010	Rybinsk, Russia	6 × 1.3 km Team Sprint F	World Cup	3rd	Wenzl
2	2009–10	7 March 2010	Lahti, Finland	4 × 10 km Relay C/F	World Cup	3rd	Dotzler / Angerer / Marschall
