= Lars Nelson =

Swedish cross-country skier (born 1985)

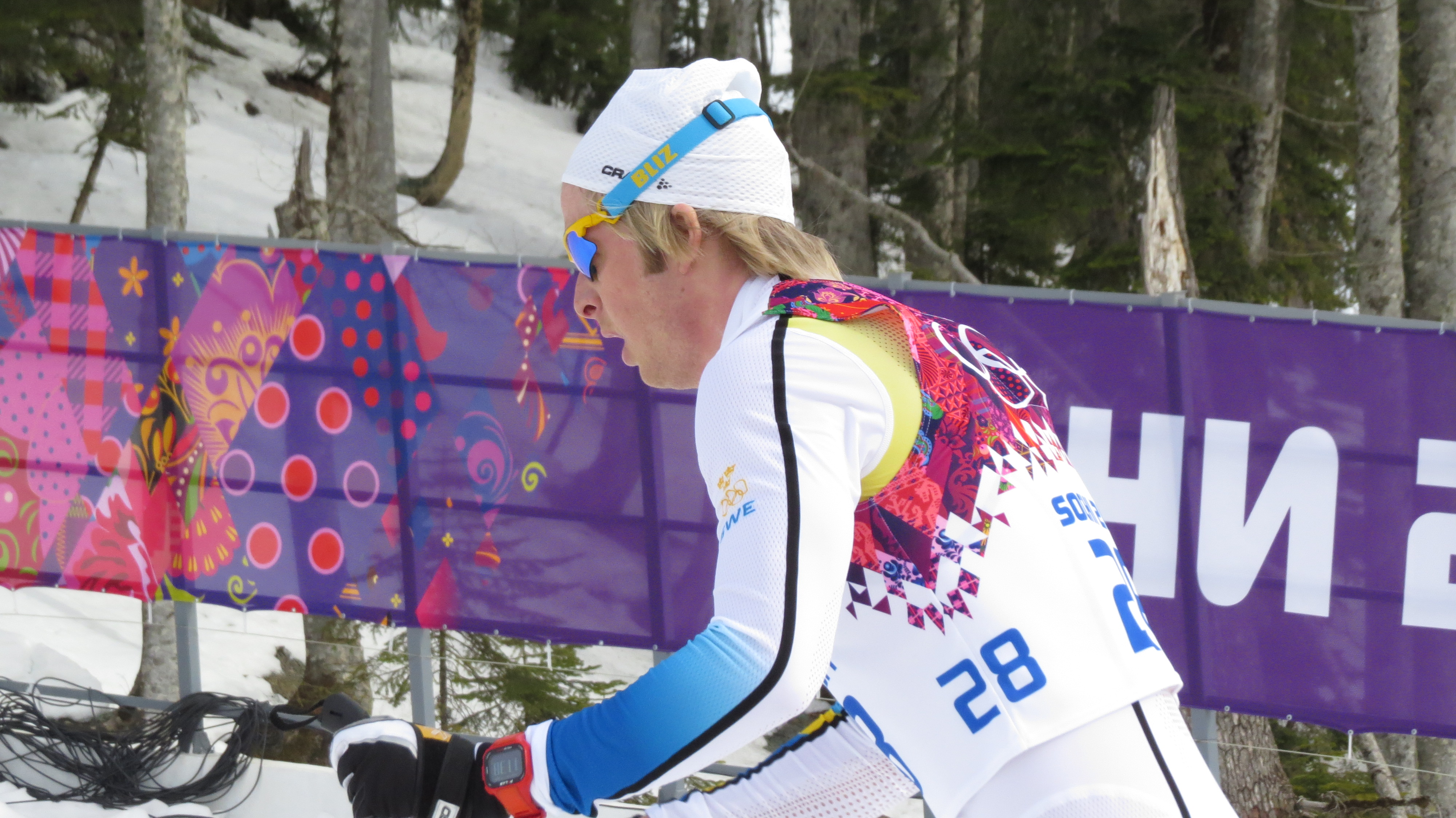
- Lars Nelson during the Olympic Winter Games in Sochi, Russia, February 2014

Personal information
- Full name: Lars Fredrik Nelson
- Nationality: Sweden
- Born: 19 August 1985 (age 41) Funäsdalen, Sweden

Sport
- Sport: Skiing
- Club: Åsarna IK

World Cup career
- Seasons: 4 – (2012–2015)
- Indiv. starts: 37
- Indiv. podiums: 0
- Team starts: 1
- Team podiums: 0
- Overall titles: 0 – (46th in 2014)
- Discipline titles: 0
Medal record
Men's cross-country skiing
Representing Sweden
Olympic Games
| Gold medal – first place | 2014 Sochi | 4 × 10 km relay |
- Updated on 4 April 2019

Lars Fredrik Nelson (born 19 August 1985, Funäsdalen) is a Swedish cross-country skier.

== Biography ==
He represented Sweden at the 2014 Winter Olympics in Sochi. On 16 February he competed in the first (classical) leg in the men's team relay and became an Olympic champion, together with his team mates Daniel Richardsson, Johan Olsson, and Marcus Hellner. Nelson showed the best time in his lap, despite losing a ski at one point. Previously, he participated in skiathlon, where he finished 10th, and 15 km classical (15th).

Nelson participated in the 2004 Junior World Championship. He was not selected for the 2010 Olympics and in fact did not ski a World Cup race until November 2011, when he finished 53rd in the 25 km race in Kuusamo. Before the 2014 Olympics, his best performance in a World Cup race was 7th place achieved in Toblach on 1 February 2014 at the 15 km classical distance. He was not selected for the 2013 World Championships.

== Cross-country skiing results ==
All results are sourced from the International Ski Federation (FIS).

=== Olympic Games ===
- 1 medal – (1 gold)

| Year | Age | 15 km individual | 30 km skiathlon | 50 km mass start | Sprint | 4 × 10 km relay | Team sprint |
|---|---|---|---|---|---|---|---|
| 2014 | 28 | 15 | 10 | — | — | Gold | — |

=== World Championships ===
| Year | Age | 15 km individual | 30 km skiathlon | 50 km mass start | Sprint | 4 × 10 km relay | Team sprint |
|---|---|---|---|---|---|---|---|
| 2015 | 29 | — | 14 | 25 | — | — | — |

=== World Cup ===
==== Season standings ====
| Season | Age | Discipline standings | | | Ski Tour standings | | |
| Season | Age | Overall | Distance | Sprint | Nordic Opening | Tour de Ski | World Cup Final |
|---|---|---|---|---|---|---|---|
| 2012 | 26 | 127 | 84 | NC | 53 | 30 | — |
| 2013 | 27 | 124 | 79 | — | — | — | — |
| 2014 | 28 | 46 | 23 | 75 | 16 | — | — |
| 2015 | 29 | 81 | 48 | NC | 43 | — | —N/a |
