= Ivan Perrillat Boiteux =

French cross-country skier

Personal information
- Nationality: France
- Born: 28 December 1985 (age 40) Annecy, France

Sport
- Sport: Skiing
- Club: Defense EMHM

World Cup career
- Seasons: 9 – (2009, 2011–2018)
- Indiv. starts: 49
- Indiv. podiums: 0
- Team starts: 5
- Team podiums: 0
- Overall titles: 0 – (85th in 2014)
- Discipline titles: 0
Medal record
Men's cross-country skiing
Representing France
Olympic Games
Bronze medal – third place	2014 Sochi	4 × 10 km relay

Ivan Perrillat Boiteux (born 28 December 1985) is a French cross-country skier.

He represented France at the 2014 Winter Olympics in Sochi. On February 16 he ran the fourth (free skiing) leg in the men's team relay and became a bronze medalist, together with his team mates Robin Duvillard, Jean-Marc Gaillard, and Maurice Manificat. This was the first ever French Olympic medal in cross-country team relay.

== Cross-country skiing results ==
All results are sourced from the International Ski Federation (FIS).

=== Olympic Games ===
- 1 medal – (1 bronze)

Year	Age	15 km individual	30 km skiathlon	50 km mass start	Sprint	4 × 10 km relay	Team sprint
2014	29	—	40	13	—	Bronze	—

=== World Championships ===
Year	Age	15 km individual	30 km skiathlon	50 km mass start	Sprint	4 × 10 km relay	Team sprint
2013	28	—	—	—	—	9	—

=== World Cup ===
==== Season standings ====
Season	Age	Discipline standings			Ski Tour standings			
Season	Age	Overall	Distance	Sprint	Nordic Opening	Tour de Ski	World Cup Final	Ski Tour Canada
2009	24	NC	NC	—	—N/a	—	—	—N/a
2011	26	NC	NC	—	—	—	—	—N/a
2012	27	139	87	—	—	—	—	—N/a
2013	28	159	99	NC	59	DNF	—	—N/a
2014	29	85	51	NC	—	37	—	—N/a
2015	30	129	77	NC	—	DNF	—N/a	—N/a
2016	31	146	94	NC	—	DNF	—N/a	—
2017	32	NC	NC	—	—	—	—	—N/a
2018	33	NC	NC	—	—	—	—	—N/a
