= 2009 Nordic Junior World Ski Championships =

International skiing competition

FIS Nordic Junior and U23 World Ski Championships 2009
- Host city: Praz de Lys-Sommand, France; Štrbské Pleso, Slovakia
- Events: 20
- Opening: 29 January
- Closing: 6 February

The FIS Nordic Junior and U23 World Ski Championships 2009 took place in Praz de Lys-Sommand, France and Štrbské Pleso, Slovakia from 29 January to 6 February 2009. It was the 32nd Junior World Championships and the 4th Under-23 World Championships in Nordic skiing.

== Medal summary ==
=== Junior events ===
==== Cross-country skiing ====
Event	Gold		Silver		Bronze	
Men's Junior Events
Men's junior sprint classic	Alexander Panzhinskiy; Russia		Timo André Bakken; Norway		Kohhei Shimizu; Japan	
Men's junior 10 kilometre free	Petr Sedov; Russia	23:53.6	Andrey Kalsin; Russia	24:26.2	Pavel Vikulin; Russia	24:33.3
Men's junior 20 kilometre skiathlon	Petr Sedov; Russia	52:54.1	Raul Shakirzianov; Russia	53:42.5	Hans Christer Holund; Norway	53:43.5
Men's junior 4 × 5 km relay	Russia; Raul Shakirzianov; Petr Sedov; Pavel Vikulin; Andrey Kalsin	54:05.1	Germany; Thomas Wick; Hannes Dotzler; Thomas Bing; Tim Tscharnke	55:13.6	Norway; Øyvind Ytterhus Utengen; Hans Christer Holund; Finn Hågen Krogh; Tomas Northug	55:20.6
Ladies' Junior Events
Ladies' junior sprint classic	Ingvild Flugstad Østberg; Norway		Hanna Brodin; Sweden		Maiken Caspersen Falla; Norway	
Ladies' junior 5 kilometre free	Ingvild Flugstad Østberg; Norway	13:44.4	Lisa Larsen; Sweden	13:48.1	Hilde Lauvhaug; Norway	13:50.5
Ladies' junior 10 kilometre skiathlon	Ingvild Flugstad Østberg; Norway	31:57.1	Krista Lähteenmäki; Finland	32:21.5	Hanna Brodin; Sweden	32:37.5
Ladies' junior 4 × 3.33 km relay	Norway; Maiken Caspersen Falla; Marthe Kristoffersen; Hilde Lauvhaug; Ingvild Flugstad Østberg	38:22.4	Sweden; Hanna Brodin; Emma Wikén; Lisa Larsen; Hanna Falk	38:52.4	Germany; Karolin Wilhelm; Lucia Anger; Monique Siegel; Hanna Kolb	40:00.6

==== Nordic Combined ====
Event	Gold		Silver		Bronze	
Normal hill/5 km	Alessandro Pittin; Italy	13:26.0	Gudmund Storlien; Norway	13:30.7	Fabian Riessle; Germany	13:41.4
Normal hill/10 km	Alessandro Pittin; Italy	28:31.7	Johannes Rydzek; Germany	29:37.6	Ole Christian Wendel; Norway	29:52.4
Team normal hill/4 × 5 km	Norway; Truls Sønstehagen Johansen; Gudmund Storlien; Ole Christian Wendel; Thorbjørn Brandt	53:17.3	France; Nicolas Martin; Samuel Guy; Wilfried Cailleau; Geoffrey Lafarge	54:16.8	Germany; Johannes Rydzek; Wolfgang Bösl; Michael Dünkel; Fabian Riessle	54:49.2

==== Ski jumping ====
Event	Gold		Silver		Bronze	
Men's Junior Events
Men's junior individual normal hill	Lukas Müller; Austria	253.0	Maciej Kot; Poland	249.0	Ville Larinto; Finland	246.0
Men's junior team normal hill	Austria; Thomas Thurnbichler; Michael Hayböck; Florian Schabereiter; Lukas Müller	981.5	Germany; Tobias Bogner; Felix Schoft; Danny Queck; Pascal Bodmer	978.5	Poland; Andrzej Zapotoczny; Jakub Kot; Grzegorz Mietus; Maciej Kot	937.0
Ladies' Junior Events
Ladies' junior individual normal hill	Magdalena Schnurr; Germany	242.0	Anna Häfele; Germany	241.5	Coline Mattel; France	236.0

=== Under-23 events ===
==== Cross-country skiing ====
Event	Gold		Silver		Bronze	
Men's Under-23 Events
Men's under-23 sprint classic	Aleš Razým; Czech Republic		Andrey Feller; Russia		Daniel Heun; Germany	
Men's under-23 15 kilometre free	Maurice Manificat; France	37:48.1	Alexey Poltoranin; Kazakhstan	38:19.8	Alexander Bessmertnykh; Russia	38:31.5
Men's under-23 30 kilometre skiathlon	Sergey Cherepanov; Kazakhstan	1:26:50.2	Alexander Bessmertnykh; Russia	1:26:52.7	Alexey Slepov; Russia	1:26:59.2
Ladies' Under-23 Events
Ladies' under-23 sprint classic	Karianne Bjellånes; Norway		Mari Laukkanen; Finland		Kerttu Niskanen; Finland	
Ladies' under-23 10 kilometre free	Sylwia Jaśkowiec; Poland	28:39.1	Betty Ann Bjerkreim Nilsen; Norway	29:21.3	Laura Orgué; Spain	29:22.9
Ladies' under-23 15 kilometre skiathlon	Sylwia Jaśkowiec; Poland	49:09.2	Astrid Øyre Slind; Norway	49:11.0	Marte Elden; Norway	50:00.6

=== Medal table ===
Rank	Nation	Gold	Silver	Bronze	Total
1	Norway (NOR)	6	4	6	16
2	Russia (RUS)	4	4	3	11
3	Poland (POL)	2	1	1	4
4	Austria (AUT)	2	0	0	2
4	Italy (ITA)	2	0	0	2
6	Germany (GER)	1	4	4	9
7	France (FRA)	1	1	1	3
8	Kazakhstan (KAZ)	1	1	0	2
9	Czech Republic (CZE)	1	0	0	1
10	Sweden (SWE)	0	3	1	4
11	Finland (FIN)	0	2	2	4
12	Japan (JPN)	0	0	1	1
12	Spain (ESP)	0	0	1	1
Totals (13 entries)		20	20	20	60
