= Philipp Marschall =

German cross-country skier (born 1988)

Personal information
- Nationality: Germany
- Born: 5 February 1988 (age 38) Bad Salzungen, East Germany

Sport
- Sport: Skiing
- Club: Rhöner WSV

World Cup career
- Seasons: 6 – (2009–2012, 2014–2015)
- Indiv. starts: 25
- Indiv. podiums: 0
- Team starts: 2
- Team podiums: 1
- Team wins: 0
- Overall titles: 0 – (162nd in 2011)
- Discipline titles: 0
Medal record
Men's cross-country skiing
Representing Germany
Junior World Championships
Gold medal – first place	2008 Mals	20 km freestyle
Silver medal – second place	2008 Mals	4 × 5 km relay

Phlipp Marschall (born 5 February 1988 in Bad Salzungen) is a German cross-country skier who competed between 2005 and 2015. His best World Cup finish was third in a 4 × 10 km relay event in Finland in March 2010.

== Cross-country skiing results ==
All results are sourced from the International Ski Federation (FIS).

=== World Cup ===
==== Season standings ====
Season	Age	Discipline standings			Ski Tour standings		
Season	Age	Overall	Distance	Sprint	Nordic Opening	Tour de Ski	World Cup Final
2009	21	NC	NC	—	—N/a	DNF	—
2010	22	182	122	—	—N/a	DNF	—
2011	23	162	105	NC	30	DNF	—
2012	24	NC	NC	NC	82	DNF	—
2014	26	NC	NC	—	—	—	—
2015	27	NC	NC	—	—	DNF	—N/a

==== Team podiums ====
- 1 podium

No.	Season	Date	Location	Race	Level	Place	Teammates
1	2009–10	7 March 2010	Lahti, Finland	4 × 10 km Relay C/F	World Cup	3rd	Dotzler / Angerer / Tscharnke
