= Hannes Dotzler =

German cross-country skier (born 1990)

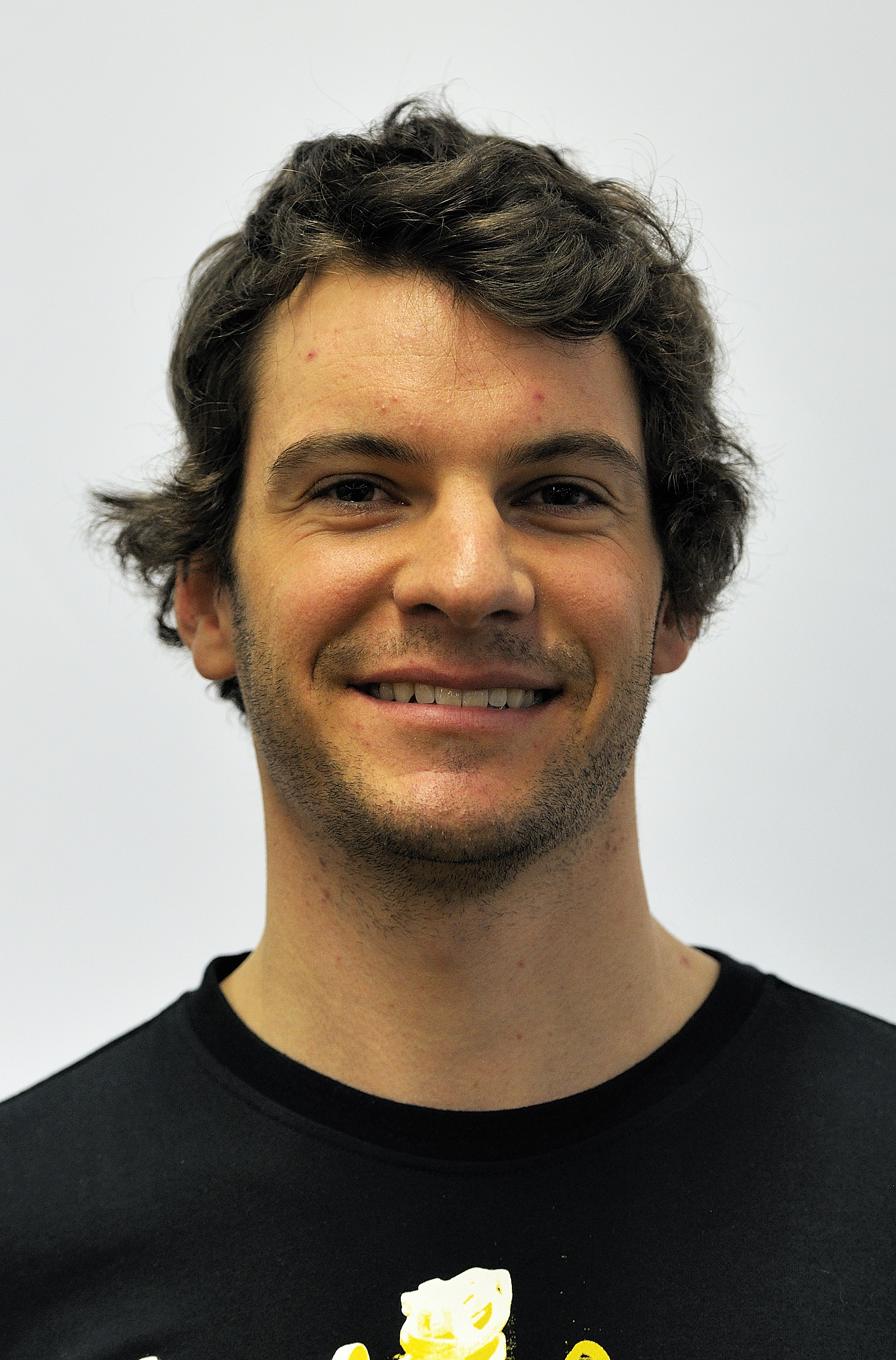
- Dotzler in 2014

Personal information
- Nationality: Germany
- Born: 25 February 1990 (age 36) Sonthofen, West Germany

Sport
- Sport: Skiing
- Club: SC Sonthofen

World Cup career
- Seasons: 7 – (2010–2015, 2017)
- Indiv. starts: 56
- Indiv. podiums: 1
- Indiv. wins: 0
- Team starts: 4
- Team podiums: 1
- Team wins: 0
- Overall titles: 0 – (26th in 2014)
- Discipline titles: 0
Medal record
Men's cross-country skiing
Representing Germany
U23 World Championships
Bronze medal – third place	2012 Erzurum	15 km classical
Bronze medal – third place	2012 Erzurum	30 km skiathlon
Junior World Championships
Silver medal – second place	2008 Mals	4 × 5 km relay
Silver medal – second place	2009 Praz de Lys-Sommand	4 × 5 km relay
Bronze medal – third place	2010 Hinterzarten	4 × 5 km relay
- Updated on 18 April 2019

Hannes Dotzler (born 25 February 1990) is a German cross-country skier who has competed since 2006. His best World Cup finish was third in a 4 × 10 km relay event in Finland in March 2010.

In the 2013 Nordic World Ski Championships in Val di Fiemme he placed seventh at the men's 50 km classical.

He was trained by his father Stefan Dotzler.

== Cross-country skiing results ==
All results are sourced from the International Ski Federation (FIS).

=== Olympic Games ===
Year	Age	15 km individual	30 km skiathlon	50 km mass start	Sprint	4 × 10 km relay	Team sprint
2014	24	11	12	—	—	9	7

=== World Championships ===
Year	Age	15 km individual	30 km skiathlon	50 km mass start	Sprint	4 × 10 km relay	Team sprint
2011	21	47	—	—	45	—	—
2013	23	24	24	7	—	7	—

=== World Cup ===
==== Season standings ====
Season	Age	Discipline standings			Ski Tour standings		
Season	Age	Overall	Distance	Sprint	Nordic Opening	Tour de Ski	World Cup Final
2010	20	171	113	—	—N/a	—	—
2011	21	105	61	NC	—	DNF	—
2012	22	82	51	NC	—	—	—
2013	23	44	30	NC	36	28	29
2014	24	26	16	NC	DNF	12	—
2015	25	127	75	NC	—	DNF	—N/a
2017	27	NC	NC	—	—	—	—

==== Individual podiums ====
- 1 podium

No.	Season	Date	Location	Race	Level	Place
1	2013–14	1 January 2014	Lenzerheide, Switzerland	15 km Mass Start C	Stage World Cup	2nd

==== Team podiums ====
- 1 podium – (1 RL)

No.	Season	Date	Location	Race	Level	Place	Teammates
1	2009–10	7 March 2010	Lahti, Finland	4 × 10 km Relay C/F	World Cup	3rd	Angerer / Marschall / Tscharnke
