= Hilde Lauvhaug =

Norwegian cross-country skier

Personal information
- Nationality: Norway
- Born: 4 April 1989 (age 37)

Sport
- Sport: Skiing
- Club: Skrautvål IF

World Cup career
- Seasons: 4 – (2008–2010, 2012)
- Indiv. starts: 8
- Indiv. podiums: 0
- Team starts: 3
- Team podiums: 0
- Overall titles: 0 – (89th in 2012)
- Discipline titles: 0
Medal record
Women's cross-country skiing
Representing Norway
U23 World Championships
Silver medal – second place	2010 Hinterzarten	15 km skiathlon
Bronze medal – third place	2011 Otepää	10 km freestyle
Junior World Championships
Gold medal – first place	2009 Praz de Lys-Sommand	4 × 3.33 km relay
Bronze medal – third place	2009 Praz de Lys-Sommand	5 km freestyle

Hilde Lauvhaug (born 4 April 1989) is a retired Norwegian cross-country skier.

She competed at the 2009 Junior World Championships, winning a gold medal in the relay, and later in the U23 class at the 2010 and 2011 Junior World Championships. She won a silver medal in 2010 and a bronze medal in 2011.

She made her World Cup debut in the 2007–08 season opener at Beitostølen, also collecting her first World Cup points with a 29th place. She later improved to a 22nd place in November 2011 at Sjusjøen; however, the relay race the next day in which she finished 6th was her last World Cup outing.

She represented the sports clubs SFK Lyn.

== Cross-country skiing results ==
All results are sourced from the International Ski Federation (FIS).

=== World Cup ===
==== Season standings ====
Season	Age	Discipline standings			Ski Tour standings		
Season	Age	Overall	Distance	Sprint	Nordic Opening	Tour de Ski	World Cup Final
2008	18	102	70	—	—N/a	—	—
2009	19	NC	NC	—	—N/a	—	—
2010	20	NC	NC	—	—N/a	—	—
2012	22	89	69	—	—	—	—
