= Tom Reichelt =

German cross-country skier (born 1982)

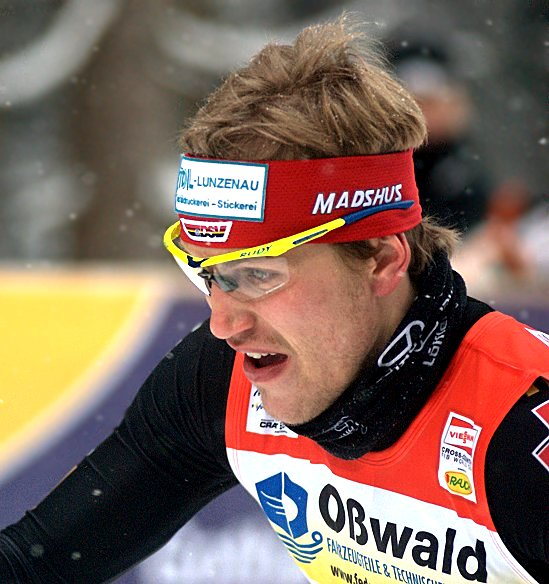
- Reichelt in 2010

Personal information
- Nationality: Germany
- Born: 12 May 1982 (age 44) Marienberg, East Germany

Sport
- Sport: Skiing
- Club: WSC Erzgebierge Oberwiesenthal

World Cup career
- Seasons: 11 – (2003, 2005–2014)
- Indiv. starts: 93
- Indiv. podiums: 2
- Indiv. wins: 0
- Team starts: 10
- Team podiums: 2
- Team wins: 0
- Overall titles: 0 – (37th in 2011)
- Discipline titles: 0
Medal record
Men's cross-country skiing
Representing Germany
U23 World Championships
Bronze medal – third place	2005 Oberstdorf	15 km freestyle

Tom Reichelt (born 12 May 1982 in Marienberg, Saxony) is a German cross country skier who has competed since 2001. At the 2010 Winter Olympics in Vancouver, he finished 35th in the 30 km mixed pursuit and 46th in the 15 km events.

Reichelt's best finish at the FIS Nordic World Ski Championships was 18th in the 50 km event at Sapporo in 2007.

His best World Cup finish was third twice, once in 2006 and the other in 2008.

== Cross-country skiing results ==
All results are sourced from the International Ski Federation (FIS).

=== Olympic Games ===
Year	Age	15 km individual	30 km skiathlon	50 km mass start	Sprint	4 × 10 km relay	Team sprint
2010	27	46	35	—	—	—	—

=== World Championships ===
Year	Age	15 km individual	30 km skiathlon	50 km mass start	Sprint	4 × 10 km relay	Team sprint
2007	24	—	—	18	—	—	—
2009	26	—	39	23	32	—	—
2011	28	—	36	18	—	—	—

=== World Cup ===
==== Season standings ====
Season	Age	Discipline standings			Ski Tour standings		
Season	Age	Overall	Distance	Sprint	Nordic Opening	Tour de Ski	World Cup Final
2003	21	NC	NC	—	—N/a	—N/a	—N/a
2005	23	118	77	—	—N/a	—N/a	—N/a
2006	24	69	45	—	—N/a	—N/a	—N/a
2007	25	55	38	NC	—N/a	25	—N/a
2008	26	NC	NC	—	—N/a	—	—
2009	27	43	27	80	—N/a	28	DNF
2010	28	49	41	80	—N/a	17	26
2011	29	37	32	NC	33	12	32
2012	30	98	63	NC	35	DNF	—
2013	31	80	72	NC	—	27	—
2014	32	160	103	—	—	—	—

==== Individual podiums ====
- 2 podiums – (1 WC, 1 SWC)

No.	Season	Date	Location	Race	Level	Place
1	2005–06	11 March 2006	Oslo, Norway	50 km Individual F	World Cup	3rd
2	2008–09	4 January 2009	Val di Fiemme, Italy	10 km Pursuit F	Stage World Cup	2nd

==== Team podiums ====
- 2 podiums – (2 RL)

No.	Season	Date	Location	Race	Level	Place	Teammates
1	2008–09	23 November 2008	Gällivare, Sweden	4 × 10 km Relay C/F	World Cup	3rd	Filbrich / Angerer / Teichmann
2	2010–11	6 February 2011	Rybinsk, Russia	4 × 10 km Relay C/F	World Cup	3rd	Kühne / Göring / Angerer
