= Sylwia Jaśkowiec =

Polish cross-country skier

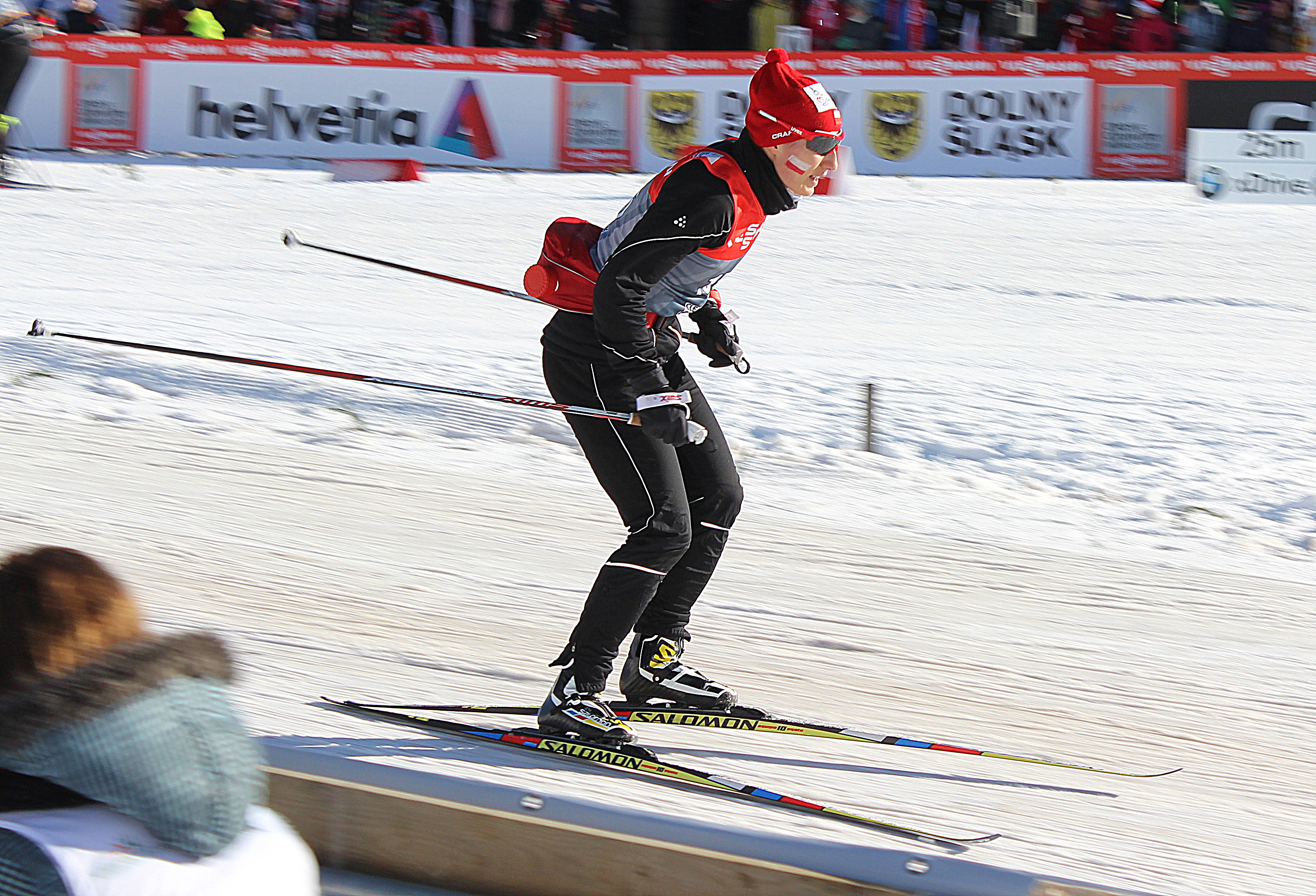

Personal information
- Nationality: Poland
- Born: 1 March 1986 (age 40) Myślenice, Poland
- Height: 1.60 m (5 ft 3 in)

Sport
- Sport: Skiing
- Club: LKS Markam Wiśniowa-Osieczany

World Cup career
- Seasons: 10 – (2004, 2007–2010, 2012–2015, 2018)
- Indiv. starts: 102
- Indiv. podiums: 1
- Indiv. wins: 0
- Team starts: 10
- Team podiums: 1
- Team wins: 0
- Overall titles: 0 – (34th in 2015)
- Discipline titles: 0
Medal record
Representing Poland
Women's cross-country skiing
World Championships
| Bronze medal – third place | 2015 Falun | Team sprint |
U23 World Championships
| Gold medal – first place | 2009 Praz de Lys-Sommand | 10 km freestyle |
| Gold medal – first place | 2009 Praz de Lys-Sommand | 15 km skiathlon |
- Updated on 13 April 2019

Sylwia Jaśkowiec (born 1 March 1986) is a Polish cross-country skier who has competed since 2002.

== Career ==
At the 2010 Winter Olympics in Vancouver, she finished 24th in the 30 km, 28th in the 10 km, and 34th in the 7.5 km + 7.5 km double pursuit event.

At the FIS Nordic World Ski Championships 2009 in Liberec, Jaśkowiec finished sixth in the 4 × 5 km relay, 31st in the individual sprint, 31st in the 7.5 km + 7.5 km double pursuit, and did not start in the 30 km event.

Her best World Cup finish was ninth in the 4 × 5 km relay in France in 2008 while her best individual finish was 23rd twice.

On 22 February 2015 in Falun, Sweden, Jaśkowiec and teammate Justyna Kowalczyk won the bronze medal for Poland at the World Championships in team sprint.

== Cross-country skiing results ==
All results are sourced from the International Ski Federation (FIS).

=== Olympic Games ===
| Year | Age | 10 km individual | 15 km skiathlon | 30 km mass start | Sprint | 4 × 5 km relay | Team sprint |
|---|---|---|---|---|---|---|---|
| 2010 | 24 | 28 | 34 | 24 | — | DSQ | DSQ |
| 2014 | 28 | — | — | 31 | 62 | 6 | 5 |
| 2018 | 32 | 24 | 30 | — | 37 | 10 | 7 |

=== World Championships ===
- 1 medal – (1 bronze)

| Year | Age | 10 km individual | 15 km skiathlon | 30 km mass start | Sprint | 4 × 5 km relay | Team sprint |
|---|---|---|---|---|---|---|---|
| 2009 | 23 | — | 30 | DNS | 30 | 6 | — |
| 2013 | 27 | 48 | — | — | — | — | 9 |
| 2015 | 29 | 14 | — | — | 32 | 5 | Bronze |

=== World Cup ===
==== Season standings ====
| Season | Age | Discipline standings | | | Ski Tour standings | | |
| Season | Age | Overall | Distance | Sprint | Nordic Opening | Tour de Ski | World Cup Final |
|---|---|---|---|---|---|---|---|
| 2004 | 18 | NC | — | NC | —N/a | —N/a | —N/a |
| 2007 | 21 | NC | NC | — | —N/a | — | —N/a |
| 2008 | 22 | 78 | 65 | 65 | —N/a | — | 44 |
| 2009 | 23 | 75 | 48 | NC | —N/a | — | 33 |
| 2010 | 24 | 91 | 65 | NC | —N/a | — | — |
| 2012 | 26 | 112 | NC | 78 | 71 | DNF | — |
| 2013 | 27 | NC | NC | NC | DNF | — | — |
| 2014 | 28 | 40 | 35 | 29 | 54 | DNF | 27 |
| 2015 | 29 | 34 | 30 | 51 | 36 | 16 | —N/a |
| 2018 | 32 | 106 | 81 | NC | — | — | 42 |

==== Individual podiums ====
- 1 podium – (1 SWC)

| No. | Season | Date | Location | Race | Level | Place |
|---|---|---|---|---|---|---|
| 1 | 2013–14 | 28 December 2013 | Oberhof, Germany | 3 km Individual F | Stage World Cup | 3rd |

==== Team podiums ====
- 1 podium – (1 TS)

| No. | Season | Date | Location | Race | Level | Place | Teammate |
|---|---|---|---|---|---|---|---|
| 1 | 2014–15 | 18 January 2015 | Otepää, Estonia | 6 × 1.2 km Team Sprint F | World Cup | 3rd | Kowalczyk |
