= Tobias Angerer =

German cross-country skier

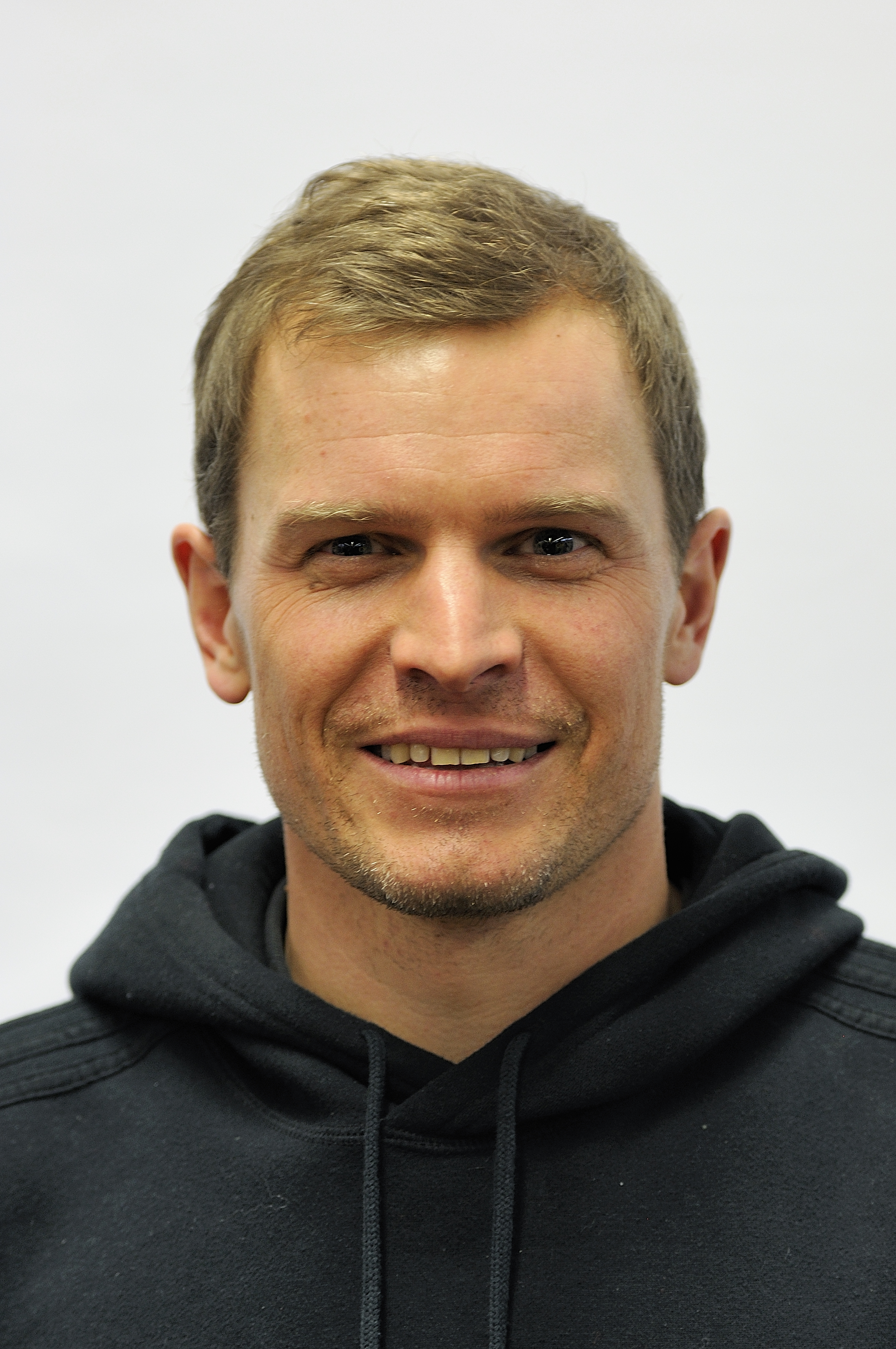

Personal information
- Nationality: Germany
- Born: 12 April 1977 (age 49) Traunstein, West Germany

Sport
- Sport: Skiing
- Club: SC Vachendorf

World Cup career
- Seasons: 16 – (1999–2014)
- Indiv. starts: 260
- Indiv. podiums: 32
- Indiv. wins: 11
- Team starts: 45
- Team podiums: 24
- Team wins: 6
- Overall titles: 2 – (2006, 2007)
- Discipline titles: 2 – (2 DI)
Medal record
Men's cross-country skiing
Representing Germany
Event	1st	2nd	3rd
Olympic Games	0	2	2
World Championships	0	4	3
Total	0	6	5
Olympic Games
Silver medal – second place	2006 Turin	4 × 10 km relay
Silver medal – second place	2010 Vancouver	30 km pursuit
Bronze medal – third place	2002 Salt Lake City	4 × 10 km relay
Bronze medal – third place	2006 Turin	15 km classical
World Championships
Silver medal – second place	2005 Oberstdorf	4 × 10 km relay
Silver medal – second place	2007 Sapporo	15 km + 15 km double pursuit
Silver medal – second place	2009 Liberec	Team sprint
Silver medal – second place	2009 Liberec	4 × 10 km relay
Bronze medal – third place	2007 Sapporo	15 km freestyle
Bronze medal – third place	2009 Liberec	50 km freestyle
Bronze medal – third place	2011 Oslo	4 × 10 km relay

Tobias Angerer (born 12 April 1977) is a German cross-country skier, and skis with the SC Vachendorf club. He graduated from the Skigymnasium Berchtesgaden in 1996. His occupation is "Sports Soldier". Angerer has been competing since 1996.

== Biography ==
Angerer was born in Traunstein, Bavaria, and turned 18 in 1995 during his first big event, the 10 km classical at the FIS Nordic Junior World Ski Championships in Asiago, Italy. The following year he took a 26th place on the 30 km freestyle and a 28th place on the 10 km classical at the World Junior Championships in Canmore, Canada.

His first victory in the FIS World Cup came on 6 January 2004 in Falun, Sweden, when he won the 2 × 15 km double pursuit in front of Italy's Pietro Piller Cottrer.

Angerer goes by the name Toby rather than Tobias. He has won the overall FIS World Cup twice, first in 2005/2006 and again in 2006/2007. The first year he won ahead of Jens Arne Svartedal in the second place and Tor Arne Hetland in the third. In the 2006/2007 event, Angerer beat number two, Russia's Alexander Legkov with 551 points and Eldar Rønning finished in third position.

At the 2006 Winter Olympics in Turin, he won a bronze medal in the 15 km classical interval start event and a silver medal in the 4 × 10 km relay.

In 2007 Angerer became the first winner of Tour de Ski men's event, winning by 46.4 seconds over Alexander Legkov.

Angerer has six medals at the FIS Nordic World Ski Championships, with four silvers (Team sprint: 2009, 15 km + 15 km double pursuit: 2007, 4 × 10 km relay: 2005, 2009) and two bronzes (15 km: 2007, 50 km: 2009). Angerer has 22 World Cup podiums and nine World Cup victories, four of the wins which were in 2 × 15 km double pursuit, three in 30 km, one in 15 km freestyle, and one in 15 km classical.

== Cross-country skiing results ==
All results are sourced from the International Ski Federation (FIS).

=== Olympic Games ===
- 4 medals – (2 silver, 2 bronze)

Year	Age	15 km	Pursuit	30 km	50 km	Sprint	4 × 10 km relay	Team sprint
2002	24	—	23	33	—	7	Bronze	—N/a
2006	28	Bronze	12	—N/a	24	—	Silver	—
2010	32	7	Silver	—N/a	4	—	6	—
2014	36	—	14	—N/a	—	—	9	—

=== World Championships ===
- 7 medals – (4 silver, 3 bronze)

Year	Age	15 km	Pursuit	30 km	50 km	Sprint	4 × 10 km relay	Team sprint
2003	25	—	60	—	36	4	—	—N/a
2005	27	19	17	—N/a	—	—	Silver	—
2007	29	Bronze	Silver	—N/a	4	—	4	4
2009	31	9	7	—N/a	Bronze	—	Silver	Silver
2011	33	9	8	—N/a	6	—	Bronze	—
2013	35	42	9	—N/a	6	—	7	—

=== World Cup ===
==== Season titles ====
- 4 titles – (2 overall, 2 distance)

Season
Season	Discipline
2006	Overall
2006	Distance
2007	Overall
2007	Distance

==== Season standings ====
Season	Age	Discipline standings					Ski Tour standings		
Season	Age	Overall	Distance	Long Distance	Middle Distance	Sprint	Nordic Opening	Tour de Ski	World Cup Final
1999	22	89	—N/a	NC	—N/a	84	—N/a	—N/a	—N/a
2000	23	NC	—N/a	—	NC	NC	—N/a	—N/a	—N/a
2001	24	84	—N/a	—N/a	—N/a	65	—N/a	—N/a	—N/a
2002	25	14	—N/a	—N/a	—N/a	17	—N/a	—N/a	—N/a
2003	26	13	—N/a	—N/a	—N/a	19	—N/a	—N/a	—N/a
2004	27	4	5	—N/a	—N/a	21	—N/a	—N/a	—N/a
2005	28	4	3rd place, bronze medalist(s)	—N/a	—N/a	33	—N/a	—N/a	—N/a
2006	29	1st place, gold medalist(s)	1st place, gold medalist(s)	—N/a	—N/a	44	—N/a	—N/a	—N/a
2007	30	1st place, gold medalist(s)	1st place, gold medalist(s)	—N/a	—N/a	13	—N/a	1st place, gold medalist(s)	—N/a
2008	31	16	11	—N/a	—N/a	52	—N/a	14	19
2009	32	15	9	—N/a	—N/a	NC	—N/a	DNF	7
2010	33	14	15	—N/a	—N/a	24	—N/a	DNF	7
2011	34	41	28	—N/a	—N/a	114	23	DNF	19
2012	35	11	11	—N/a	—N/a	83	16	11	17
2013	36	14	9	—N/a	—N/a	80	38	15	24
2014	37	94	56	—N/a	—N/a	NC	56	DNF	—

==== Individual podiums ====
- 11 victories – (11 WC)
- 32 podiums – (28 WC, 4 SWC)

No.	Season	Date	Location	Race	Level	Place
1	2002–03	21 November 2002	Ramsau, Austria	10 km + 10 km Pursuit C/F	World Cup	3rd
2	2002–03	12 February 2003	Reit im Winkl, Germany	1.5 km Sprint F	World Cup	3rd
3	2003–04	21 December 2003	Ramsau, Austria	10 km Individual F	World Cup	3rd
4	2003–04	6 January 2004	Falun, Sweden	15 km + 15 km Pursuit C/F	World Cup	1st
5	2004–05	15 January 2005	Nové Město, Czech Republic	15 km Individual F	World Cup	3rd
6	2004–05	19 March 2005	Falun, Sweden	15 km + 15 km Pursuit C/F	World Cup	2nd
7	2005–06	26 November 2005	Rukatunturi, Finland	15 km Individual C	World Cup	1st
8	2005–06	27 November 2005	Rukatunturi, Finland	15 km Individual F	World Cup	3rd
9	2005–06	10 December 2005	Vernon, Canada	15 km + 15 km Pursuit C/F	World Cup	1st
10	2005–06	15 December 2005	Vernon, Canada	15 km Individual F	World Cup	3rd
11	2005–06	17 December 2005	Vernon, Canada	30 km Mass Start C	World Cup	1st
12	2005–06	14 January 2006	Lago di Tesero, Italy	30 km Mass Start F	World Cup	1st
13	2005–06	21 January 2006	Oberstdorf, Germany	15 km + 15 km Pursuit C/F	World Cup	1st
14	2005–06	8 March 2006	Falun, Sweden	10 km + 10 km Pursuit C/F	World Cup	2nd
15	2006–07	16 December 2006	La Clusaz, France	30 km Mass Start F	World Cup	1st
16	2006–07	2 January 2007	Oberstdorf, Germany	10 km + 10 km Pursuit C/F	Stage World Cup	3rd
17	2006–07	3 January 2007	Oberstdorf, Germany	15 km Individual C	Stage World Cup	3rd
18	2006–07	31 December 2006 – 7 January 2007	(Germany) (Italy) Tour de Ski	Overall Standings	World Cup	1st
19	2006–07	20 January 2007	Rybinsk, Russia	30 km Mass Start F	World Cup	3rd
20	2006–07	21 January 2007	Rybinsk, Russia	1.2 km Sprint F	World Cup	3rd
21	2006–07	16 February 2007	Changchun, China	15 km Individual F	World Cup	1st
22	2006–07	11 March 2007	Lahti, Finland	15 km Individual C	World Cup	3rd
23	2006–07	17 March 2007	Oslo, Norway	50 km Individual C	World Cup	3rd
24	2006–07	24 March 2007	Falun, Sweden	15 km + 15 km Pursuit C/F	World Cup	1st
25	2008–09	30 January 2009	Rybinsk, Russia	15 km Mass Start F	World Cup	1st
26	2008–09	14 March 2009	Trondheim, Norway	50 km Mass Start C	World Cup	2nd
27	2008–09	21 March 2009	Falun, Sweden	10 km + 10 km Pursuit C/F	Stage World Cup	2nd
28	2009–10	19 December 2009	Rogla, Slovenia	1.5 km Sprint C	World Cup	2nd
29	2009–10	20 March 2010	Falun, Sweden	10 km + 10 km Pursuit C/F	Stage World Cup	2nd
30	2011–12	4 February 2012	Rybinsk, Russia	15 km Mass Start F	World Cup	3rd
31	2011–12	5 February 2012	Rybinsk, Russia	15 km + 15 km Skiathlon C/F	World Cup	3rd
32	2012–13	3 February 2013	Canmore, Canada	15 km Mass Start C	World Cup	3rd

==== Team podiums ====
- 6 victories – (5 RL, 1 TS)
- 24 podiums – (15 RL, 9 TS)

No.	Season	Date	Location	Race	Level	Place	Teammate(s)
1	1999–00	8 December 1999	Asiago, Italy	Team Sprint F	World Cup	1st	Schlickenrieder
2	2001–02	3 March 2002	Lahti, Finland	6 × 1.5 km Team Sprint F	World Cup	2nd	Sommerfeldt
3	2002–03	24 November 2002	Kiruna, Sweden	4 × 10 km Relay C/F	World Cup	3rd	Schlütter / Teichmann / Sommerfeldt
4	2002–03	19 January 2003	Nové Město, Czech Republic	4 × 10 km Relay C/F	World Cup	3rd	Filbrich / Schlütter / Stitzl
5	2002–03	26 January 2003	Oberhof, Germany	10 × 1.5 km Team Sprint F	World Cup	2nd	Sommerfeldt
6	2002–03	14 February 2003	Asiago, Italy	10 × 1.4 km Team Sprint F	World Cup	2nd	Sommerfeldt
7	2003–04	26 October 2003	Düsseldorf, Germany	6 × 1.5 km Team Sprint F	World Cup	2nd	Teichmann
8	2003–04	23 November 2003	Beitostølen, Norway	4 × 10 km Relay C/F	World Cup	1st	Filbrich / Teichmann / Sommerfeldt
9	2003–04	14 December 2003	Davos, Switzerland	4 × 10 km Relay C/F	World Cup	2nd	Filbrich / Schlütter / Sommerfeldt
10	2003–04	11 January 2004	Otepää, Estonia	4 × 10 km Relay C/F	World Cup	1st	Schlütter / Filbrich / Teichmann
11	2003–04	7 February 2004	La Clusaz, France	4 × 10 km Relay C/F	World Cup	2nd	Filbrich / Teichmann / Sommerfeldt
12	2003–04	15 February 2004	Oberstdorf, Germany	6 × 1.2 km Team Sprint F	World Cup	3rd	Sommerfeldt
13	2004–05	24 October 2004	Düsseldorf, Germany	6 × 1.5 km Team Sprint F	World Cup	2nd	Teichmann
14	2004–05	21 November 2004	Gällivare, Sweden	4 × 10 km Relay C/F	World Cup	1st	Filbrich / Sommerfeldt / Teichmann
15	2005–06	20 November 2005	Beitostølen, Norway	4 × 10 km Relay C/F	World Cup	1st	Schlütter / Teichmann / Filbrich
16	2005–06	15 January 2006	Lago di Tesero, Italy	4 × 10 km Relay C/F	World Cup	2nd	Sommerfeldt / Teichmann / Filbrich
17	2005–06	18 March 2006	Sapporo, Japan	6 × 1.5 km Team Sprint F	World Cup	3rd	Teichmann
18	2006–07	19 November 2006	Gällivare, Sweden	4 × 10 km Relay C/F	World Cup	1st	Filbrich / Göring / Teichmann
19	2006–07	17 December 2006	La Clusaz, France	4 × 10 km Relay C/F	World Cup	3rd	Seifert / Sommerfeldt / Teichmann
20	2008–09	23 November 2008	Gällivare, Sweden	4 × 10 km Relay C/F	World Cup	3rd	Filbrich / Reichelt / Teichmann
21	2009–10	22 November 2009	Beitostølen, Norway	4 × 10 km Relay C/F	World Cup	3rd	Filbrich / Teichmann / Sommerfeldt
22	2009–10	7 March 2010	Lahti, Finland	4 × 10 km Relay C/F	World Cup	3rd	Dotzler / Marschall / Tscharnke
23	2010–11	6 February 2011	Rybinsk, Russia	4 × 10 km Relay C/F	World Cup	3rd	Kühne / Göring / Reichelt
24	2012–13	3 February 2013	Sochi, Russia	6 × 1.8 km Team Sprint C	World Cup	3rd	Teichmann
