= Timo André Bakken =

Norwegian cross-country skier

Personal information
- Nationality: Norway
- Born: March 21, 1989 (age 37) Nedre Eiker, Norway

Sport
- Sport: Skiing
- Club: Konnerud IL

World Cup career
- Seasons: 10 – (2008–2017)
- Indiv. starts: 15
- Indiv. podiums: 1
- Indiv. wins: 0
- Team starts: 0
- Overall titles: 0 – (45th in 2015)
- Discipline titles: 0
Medal record
Men's cross-country skiing
Representing Norway
U23 World Championships
Silver medal – second place	2011 Otepää	Individual sprint
Junior World Championships
Silver medal – second place	2009 Praz de Lys-Sommand	Individual sprint
- Updated on 7 January 2020

Timo André Bakken (born 21 March 1989) is a Norwegian cross-country skier.

== Career ==
He won a silver medal in the sprint race at the 2009 Junior World Ski Championships. He made his World Cup debut in March 2008 in Drammen, and collected his first World Cup points in March 2009 in Trondheim. A 27th place in November 2009 in Kuusamo followed.

He represents the sports club Mjøndalen IF, and lives in Skotselv.

In 2012 Bakken become the world fastest skier in 100m. He beat skiers like Petter Northug and Emil Jönsson. However, in 2013 Ludvig Søgnen Jensen beat his record.

== Cross-country skiing results ==
All results are sourced from the International Ski Federation (FIS).

=== World Cup ===
==== Season standings ====
Season	Age	Discipline standings			Ski Tour standings			
Season	Age	Overall	Distance	Sprint	Nordic Opening	Tour de Ski	World Cup Final	Ski Tour Canada
2008	19	NC	—	NC	—N/a	—	—	—N/a
2009	20	125	—	72	—N/a	—	—	—N/a
2010	21	151	—	85	—N/a	—	—	—N/a
2011	22	167	—	105	—	—	—	—N/a
2012	23	NC	—	NC	—	—	—	—N/a
2013	24	NC	—	NC	—	—	—	—N/a
2014	25	NC	—	NC	—	—	—	—N/a
2015	26	45	—	14	—	—	—N/a	—N/a
2016	27	119	—	76	—	—	—N/a	—
2017	28	134	—	70	—	—	—	—N/a

==== Individual podiums ====
- 1 podium – (1 WC)

No.	Season	Date	Location	Race	Level	Place
1	2014–15	14 February 2015	Östersund, Sweden	1.2 km Sprint C	World Cup	3rd
