= Mathias Rundgreen =

Norwegian cross-country skier

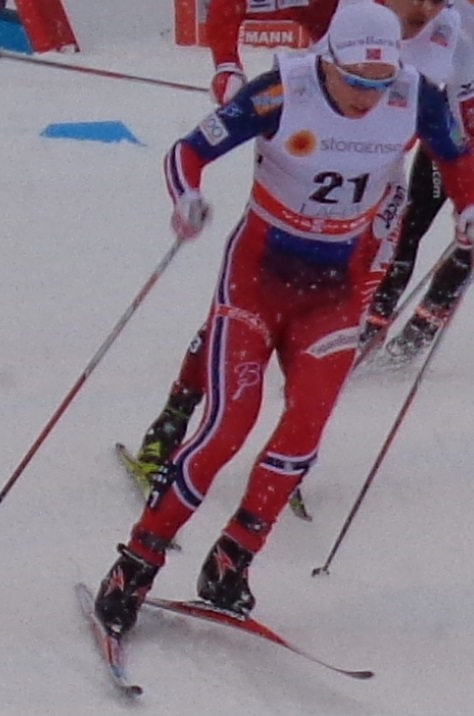
- Mathias Rundgreen, was a Norwegian cross-country skier.

Personal information
- Nationality: Norway
- Born: February 21, 1991 (age 35)

Sport
- Sport: Skiing
- Club: Byåsen IL

World Cup career
- Seasons: 6 – (2014–2019)
- Indiv. starts: 22
- Indiv. podiums: 1
- Indiv. wins: 0
- Team starts: 3
- Team podiums: 2
- Team wins: 1
- Overall titles: 0 – (54th in 2017)
- Discipline titles: 0
Medal record
Men's cross-country skiing
Representing Norway
U23 World Championships
Bronze medal – third place	2014 Val di Fiemme	15 km classical
Junior World Championships
Gold medal – first place	2011 Otepää	4 × 5 km relay
- Updated on 7 January 2020

Mathias Rundgreen (born 21 February 1991) is a Norwegian cross-country skier.

He competed in three events at the 2011 Junior World Championships, winning a gold medal in the relay. He later competed at the 2012, 2013 and 2014 Junior World Championships, all in the U23 age class, and took a bronze medal in the 2014 15 km.

He made his World Cup debut in March 2014 in the Holmenkollen 50 km race, collecting his first World Cup points in January 2015 with a 27th place in the Rybinsk 15 km. He broke the top 10 and 20 at the same time with a seventh place in the March 2015 Lahti sprint. He made the podium for the first time in February 2017 in PyeongChang, finishing third in the 15+15 km skiathlon.

He represents the sports club Byåsen IL.

== Cross-country skiing results ==
All results are sourced from the International Ski Federation (FIS).

=== World Cup ===
==== Season standings ====
Season	Age	Discipline standings			Ski Tour standings			
Season	Age	Overall	Distance	Sprint	Nordic Opening	Tour de Ski	World Cup Final	Ski Tour Canada
2014	23	NC	NC	—	—	—	—	—N/a
2015	24	72	56	48	—	—	—N/a	—N/a
2016	25	90	61	81	—	—	—N/a	—
2017	26	54	34	57	40	—	—	—N/a
2018	27	NC	NC	—	—	—	—	—N/a
2019	28	74	56	70	—	—	—	—N/a

==== Individual podiums ====
- 1 podium – (1 WC)

No.	Season	Date	Location	Race	Level	Place
1	2016–17	4 February 2017	Pyeongchang, South Korea	15 km + 15 km Skiathlon C/F	World Cup	3rd

==== Team podiums ====
- 1 victory – (1 RL)
- 2 podiums – (2 RL)

No.	Season	Date	Location	Race	Level	Place	Teammates
1	2015–16	6 December 2015	Lillehammer, Norway	4 × 7.5 km Relay C/F	World Cup	2nd	Nyenget / Sveen / Krogh
2	2015–16	24 January 2016	Nové Město, Czech Republic	4 × 7.5 km Relay C/F	World Cup	1st	Røthe / Sundby / Krogh
