= Cross-country skiing at the 2014 Winter Olympics – Men's 30 kilometre skiathlon =

Men's 30 kilometre skiathlon at the XXII Olympic Winter Games
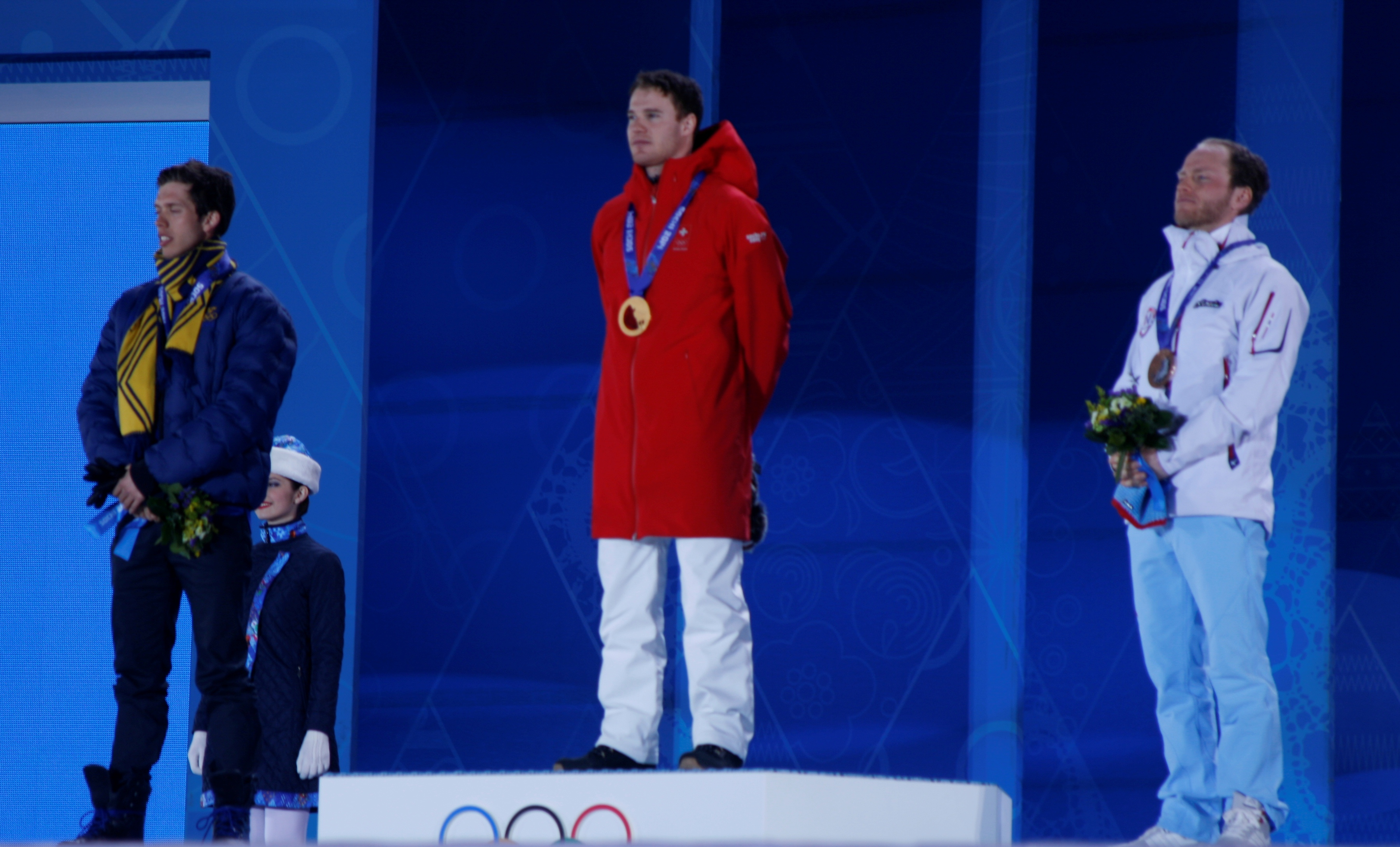
- The Medalists
- Venue: Laura Biathlon & Ski Complex
- Dates: 9 February 2014
- Competitors: 68 from 30 nations
- Winning time: 1:08:15.4

Medalists
1st place, gold medalist(s)		Dario Cologna	Switzerland
2nd place, silver medalist(s)		Marcus Hellner	Sweden
3rd place, bronze medalist(s)		Martin Johnsrud Sundby	Norway

The men's 30 kilometre skiathlon cross-country skiing competition at the 2014 Sochi Olympics was held on 9 February 2014 at 14:00 MSK at the Laura Biathlon & Ski Complex. The event is split into half distance classic skiing and half distance skate skiing.

== Summary ==
Dario Cologna from Switzerland won the gold medal. Marcus Hellner, the defending Olympic champion from Sweden, finished second, and Martin Johnsrud Sundby from Norway came third.

For much of the free skiing half of the course about fifteen athletes were skiing together, and only close to the stadium, a group of four, Cologna, Hellner, Sundby and Maxim Vylegzhanin escaped. At the stadium, Cologna escaped and became the champion. Sundby finished third closely ahead of Vylegzhanin, and the Russian delegation filed a protest because he apparently changed the track in the finish area, impeding Vylegzhanin. Sundby was reprimanded but allowed to keep the bronze medal.

== Qualification ==
An athlete with a maximum of 100 FIS distance points (the A standard) will be allowed to compete in both or one of the event (sprint/distance). An athlete with a maximum 120 FIS sprint points will be allowed to compete in the sprint event and 10 km for women or 15 km for men provided their distance points do not exceed 300 FIS points. NOC's who do not have any athlete meeting the A standard can enter one competitor of each sex (known as the basic quota) in only 10 km classical event for women or 15 km classical event for men. They must have a maximum of 300 FIS distance points at the end of qualifying on 20 January 2014. The qualification period began in July 2012.

== Competition schedule ==
All times are (UTC+4).

Date	Time	Event
9 February	14:00	Final

== Results ==
The race was started at 14:00.

Rank	Bib	Name	Country	15 km classic	Rank	Pitstop	15 km free	Rank	Finish time	Deficit
1st place, gold medalist(s)	21	Dario Cologna	Switzerland	36:04.9	13	30.9	31:39.6	2	1:08:15.4	—
2nd place, silver medalist(s)	11	Marcus Hellner	Sweden	36:03.1	9	31.3	31:41.4	3	1:08:15.8	+0.4
3rd place, bronze medalist(s)	1	Martin Johnsrud Sundby	Norway	35:59.2	1	29.6	31:48.0	5	1:08:16.8	+1.4
4	7	Maxim Vylegzhanin	Russia	36:01.1	5	31.8	31:44.0	4	1:08:16.9	+1.5
5	9	Ilia Chernousov	Russia	36:12.8	18	39.5	31:36.7	1	1:08:29.0	+13.6
6	14	Jean-Marc Gaillard	France	36:03.1	9	31.5	31:55.2	7	1:08:29.8	+14.4
7	15	Daniel Rickardsson	Sweden	35:59.2	2	29.6	32:02.6	9	1:08:31.7	+16.3
8	6	Johannes Dürr	Austria	36:04.0	11	32.2	31:55.8	8	1:08:32.0	+16.6
9	12	Maurice Manificat	France	36:07.6	16	32.0	31:54.0	6	1:08:33.6	+18.2
10	27	Lars Nelson	Sweden	36:00.2	3	31.2	32:06.3	10	1:08:37.7	+22.3
11	2	Alexander Legkov	Russia	36:02.4	7	31.2	32:09.5	12	1:08:43.1	+27.7
12	24	Giorgio Di Centa	Italy	36:02.6	8	30.0	32:11.1	14	1:08:43.7	+28.3
13	8	Hannes Dotzler	Germany	36:04.3	12	31.3	32:09.2	11	1:08:44.8	+29.4
14	25	Anders Södergren	Sweden	36:05.4	14	31.9	32:09.6	13	1:08:46.9	+31.5
15	23	Tobias Angerer	Germany	36:00.6	4	31.5	32:17.6	15	1:08:49.7	+34.3
16	3	Alexey Poltoranin	Kazakhstan	36:01.5	6	32.3	32:17.7	16	1:08:51.5	+36.1
17	5	Petter Northug	Norway	36:06.3	15	30.6	33:02.7	25	1:09:39.6	+1:24.2
18	4	Alex Harvey	Canada	36:46.6	27	30.1	32:43.5	17	1:10:00.2	+1:44.8
19	13	Evgeniy Belov	Russia	36:11.0	17	30.5	33:19.0	31	1:10:00.5	+1:45.1
20	10	Sjur Røthe	Norway	36:41.7	25	30.2	32:50.6	18	1:10:02.5	+1:47.1
21	20	Tord Asle Gjerdalen	Norway	36:36.5	21	29.4	33:00.8	23	1:10:06.7	+1:51.3
22	37	Francesco de Fabiani	Italy	36:37.6	22	33.5	32:59.6	22	1:10:10.7	+1:55.3
23	28	Axel Teichmann	Germany	36:20.4	19	31.5	33:21.4	32	1:10:13.3	+1:57.9
24	33	Michail Semenov	Belarus	36:48.2	29	30.6	32:54.5	19	1:10:13.3	+1:57.9
25	18	Ivan Babikov	Canada	36:47.6	28	28.8	32:58.2	20	1:10:14.6	+1:59.2
26	44	Iivo Niskanen	Finland	36:42.3	26	31.9	33:07.8	29	1:10:22.0	+2:06.6
27	31	Curdin Perl	Switzerland	36:40.8	24	36.2	33:05.4	27	1:10:22.4	+2:07.0
28	30	Martin Jakš	Czech Republic	37:20.5	39	30.7	33:00.9	24	1:10:52.1	+2:36.7
29	46	Jonas Baumann	Switzerland	37:06.1	34	31.4	33:14.8	30	1:10:52.3	+2:36.9
30	22	Roland Clara	Italy	37:19.9	38	32.1	33:04.3	26	1:10:56.3	+2:40.9
31	47	Martin Bajčičák	Slovakia	37:21.7	40	31.1	33:07.3	28	1:11:00.1	+2:44.7
32	38	Yevgeniy Velichko	Kazakhstan	36:53.8	30	34.8	33:37.0	35	1:11:05.6	+2:50.2
33	17	Sami Jauhojärvi	Finland	36:54.3	31	30.9	33:46.8	36	1:11:12.0	+2:56.6
34	42	Sergei Dolidovich	Belarus	36:57.2	32	35.0	33:55.9	38	1:11:28.1	+3:12.7 (PF)
35	26	Noah Hoffman	United States	37:19.3	37	34.7	33:34.1	34	1:11:28.1	+3:12.7 (PF)
36	32	Petr Novák	Czech Republic	37:56.0	47	33.3	32:59.2	21	1:11:28.5	+3:13.1
37	19	Thomas Bing	Germany	36:27.7	20	31.1	34:34.1	46	1:11:32.9	+3.17.5
38	29	Lari Lehtonen	Finland	37:30.8	42	32.0	33:31.3	33	1:11:34.1	+3:18.7
39	51	Maciej Kreczmer	Poland	37:07.5	35	34.6	34:05.5	40	1:11:47.6	+3:32.2
40	16	Matti Heikkinen	Finland	36:40.3	23	33.1	34:39.2	48	1:11:52.6	+3:37.2
41	34	Ivan Perrillat Boiteux	France	37:09.4	36	30.5	34:24.6	44	1:12:04.5	+3:49.1
42	45	Erik Bjornsen	United States	37:05.6	33	31.2	35:05.5	50	1:12:42.3	+4:26.9
43	56	Philipp Haelg	Liechtenstein	37:51.8	44	33.3	34:22.7	41	1:12:47.8	+4:32.4
44	36	Jiří Magál	Czech Republic	37:54.6	46	31.9	34:23.0	43	1:12:49.5	+4:34.1
45	40	Graeme Killick	Canada	38:18.2	49	35.0	34:22.9	42	1:13:16.1	+5:00.7
46	52	Sergey Mikayelyan	Armenia	38:43.1	51	33.7	33:59.8	39	1:13:16.6	+5:01.2
47	41	Brian Gregg	United States	38:57.4	53	35.6	33:53.3	37	1:13:26.3	+5:10.9
48	48	Paul Constantin Pepene	Romania	37:52.5	45	33.3	35:10.4	52	1:13:36.2	+5:20.8
49	49	Sergey Cherepanov	Kazakhstan	37:36.8	43	36.5	35:26.4	55	1:13:39.7	+5:24.3
50	54	Imanol Rojo	Spain	38:26.5	50	38.5	34:35.4	47	1:13:40.4	+5:25.0
51	43	Aivar Rehemaa	Estonia	38:04.3	48	33.6	35:09.3	51	1:13:47.2	+5:31.8
52	62	Martin Møller	Denmark	38:59.0	56	32.8	34:33.3	45	1:14:05.1	+5:49.7
53	39	Veselin Tzinzov	Bulgaria	39:01.1	57	30.8	34:40.1	49	1:14:12.0	+5:56.6
54	35	Kris Freeman	United States	37:30.5	41	33.3	36:30.8	61	1:14:34.6	+6:19.2
55	53	Alexander Lasutkin	Belarus	38:46.9	52	40.3	35:12.2	54	1:14:39.4	+6:24.0
56	50	Mark Starostin	Kazakhstan	38:57.8	54	35.0	36:03.8	56	1:15:36.6	+7:21.2
57	60	Andrey Gridin	Bulgaria	39:56.3	58	36.5	35:11.9	53	1:15:44.7	+7:29.3
58	55	Javier Gutiérrez Cuevas	Spain	38:58.2	55	32.2	36:30.6	60	1:16:01.0	+7:45.6
59	66	Xu Wenlong	China	39:57.9	60	34.4	36:21.0	58	1:16:53.3	+8:37.9
60	61	Callum Watson	Australia	40:09.8	62	29.0	36:21.6	59	1:17:00.4	+8:45.0
61	63	Paweł Klisz	Poland	40:09.3	61	29.7	36:39.5	62	1:17:18.5	+9:03.1
62	59	Callum Smith	Great Britain	39:57.4	59	37.2	37:02.5	64	1:17:37.1	+9:21.7
63	67	Artur Yeghoyan	Armenia	40:11.7	63	41.8	36:51.0	63	1:17:44.5	+9:29.1
64	58	Jan Antolec	Poland	41:32.2	68	33.8	36:12.8	57	1:18:18.8	+10:03.4
65	57	Edi Dadić	Croatia	41:08.0	66	35.0	37:48.5	65	1:19:31.5	+11:16.1
66	65	Arvis Liepiņš	Latvia	40:44.1	64	36.1	38:39.9	66	1:20:00.1	+11:44.7
67	64	Vytautas Strolia	Lithuania	40:54.7	65	39.1	39:03.4	67	1:20:37.2	+12.21.8
68	68	Hwang Jun-Ho	South Korea	41:22.6	67	39.9	LAP	68	LAP	+LAP

PF = Photo Finish
