= Cross-country skiing at the 2014 Winter Olympics – Men's 4 × 10 kilometre relay =

Men's 4 × 10 kilometre relay at the XXII Olympic Winter Games
- Venue: Laura Biathlon & Ski Complex
- Date: 16 February 2014
- Competitors: 64 from 16 nations
- Teams: 16
- Winning time: 1:28:42.0

Medalists
1st place, gold medalist(s)		Lars Nelson; Daniel Rickardsson; Johan Olsson; Marcus Hellner	Sweden
2nd place, silver medalist(s)		Dmitry Yaparov; Alexander Bessmertnykh; Alexander Legkov; Maxim Vylegzhanin	Russia
3rd place, bronze medalist(s)		Jean-Marc Gaillard; Maurice Manificat; Robin Duvillard; Ivan Perrillat Boiteux	France

The men's 4 × 10 kilometre relay cross-country skiing competition at the 2014 Sochi Olympics took place on 16 February at Laura Biathlon & Ski Complex.

In November 2017, Alexander Legkov and Maxim Vylegzhanin were disqualified for doping offences. As a result Russia lost the silver medal. On 1 February 2018, their results were restored as a result of the successful appeal.

== Results ==
The race was started at 14:00.

Rank	Bib	Nation	Time	Deficit
1st place, gold medalist(s)	2	Sweden; Lars Nelson; Daniel Rickardsson; Johan Olsson; Marcus Hellner	1:28:42.0; 23:16.5; 22:59.6; 21:00.4; 21:25.5	—
2nd place, silver medalist(s)	3	Russia; Dmitry Yaparov; Alexander Bessmertnykh; Alexander Legkov; Maxim Vylegzhanin	1:29:09.3; 23:43.8; 23:13.6; 20:33.4; 21:38.5	+27.3
3rd place, bronze medalist(s)	9	France; Jean-Marc Gaillard; Maurice Manificat; Robin Duvillard; Ivan Perrillat Boiteux	1:29:13.9; 23:26.1; 23:13.6; 20:55.4; 21:38.8	+31.9
4	1	Norway; Eldar Rønning; Chris Jespersen; Martin Johnsrud Sundby; Petter Northug	1:29:51.7; 23:42.8; 23:36.1; 20:56.8; 21:36.0	+1:09.7
5	4	Italy; Dietmar Nöckler; Giorgio Di Centa; Roland Clara; David Hofer	1:30:04.7; 23:41.5; 23:16.3; 21:00.4; 22:06.5	+1:22.7
6	5	Finland; Sami Jauhojärvi; Iivo Niskanen; Lari Lehtonen; Matti Heikkinen	1:30:28.4; 23:16.8; 22:59.3; 22:09.7; 22:02.6	+1:46.4
7	6	Switzerland; Curdin Perl; Jonas Baumann; Remo Fischer; Toni Livers	1:30:33.8; 23:38.0; 23:34.0; 21:49.1; 21:32.7	+1:51.8
8	11	Czech Republic; Aleš Razym; Lukáš Bauer; Martin Jakš; Dušan Kožíšek	1:30:36.8; 23:43.5; 22:49.9; 21:25.2; 22:38.2	+1:54.8
9	7	Germany; Jens Filbrich; Axel Teichmann; Tobias Angerer; Hannes Dotzler	1:31:18.8; 23:53.3; 23:18.5; 21:32.9; 22:34.1	+2:36.8
10	15	Estonia; Karel Tammjärv; Algo Kärp; Aivar Rehemaa; Raido Ränkel	1:32:52.6; 24:17.2; 23:53.3; 22:13.0; 22:29.1	+4:10.6
11	10	United States; Andrew Newell; Erik Bjornsen; Noah Hoffman; Simi Hamilton	1:33:15.1; 24:34.3; 23:56.8; 21:37.4; 23:06.6	+4:33.1
12	12	Canada; Len Väljas; Ivan Babikov; Graeme Killick; Jesse Cockney	1:33:19.0; 24:16.1; 23:56.9; 22:04.6; 23:01.4	+4:37.0
13	13	Kazakhstan; Denis Volotka; Sergey Cherepanov; Yevgeniy Velichko; Mark Starostin	1:34:11.9; 23:50.1; 24:28.7; 22:44.2; 23:08.9	+5:29.9
14	14	Belarus; Michail Semenov; Alexander Lasutkin; Aliaksei Ivanou; Sergei Dolidovich	1:34:40.1; 24:20.6; 25:13.2; 22:27.8; 22:38.5	+5:58.1
15	16	Poland; Maciej Kreczmer; Sebastian Gazurek; Maciej Staręga; Jan Antolec	1:35:46.5; 24:04.1; 24:35.5; 22:42.9; 24:24.0	+7:04.5
16	8	Japan; Hiroyuki Miyazawa; Keishin Yoshida; Nobu Naruse; Akira Lenting	LAP; 25:17.8; 24:54.3; 23:31.2	
