= George Bosl =

American cancer researcher

George Bosl (born 1948) is an American cancer researcher, holder of the Patrick M. Byrne Chair in Clinical Oncology at the Memorial Sloan-Kettering Cancer Center in New York City, and is a professor of medicine at the Weill Cornell Medical College. In 1997, he was appointed chair of the Department of Medicine at Sloan-Kettering, a position which he held until 2015. In 2019, he was named Memorial Sloan Kettering's first ombudsperson.

== Biography ==
Bosl earned his bachelor's degree at John Carroll University, in Cleveland, Ohio, and his M.D. at Creighton University School of Medicine in Omaha, Nebraska. He trained in internal medicine at The New York Hospital and worked at Memorial Sloan Kettering Cancer Center as chief medical resident. He completed a fellowship in medical oncology at the University of Minnesota and then returned to Sloan Kettering to join the faculty in 1979. At Memorial Sloan Kettering Cancer Center he has been director of the Oncology/Hematology training program, chief of the Genitourinary Oncology Service, head of the Division of Solid Tumor Oncology, and associate physician-in-chief before becoming chair of the Department of Medicine on February 1, 1997.

He also heads the Joachim Silbermann Family Program on Aging and Cancer and has received grants from the National Institute of Health to study the sharp increase of older adults developing this disease.

== Academic work ==
Bosl is a specialist in the treatment of genitourinary tumors particularly in testicular cancer. He is known for targeting a marker chromosome for Germ cell tumors. His studies investigate molecular targets of drug resistance in patients and developing dose-intensive chemotherapy and new chemotherapeutic agents, evaluating new combinations for patients with relapsing or resistant disease. Some of his research is also centered on new therapies for head and neck cancers. Bosl received many awards and honors, including the Patrick M. Byrne Chair in Clinical Oncology at MSKCC in 1995, the 2005 MSKCC Excellence in Medicine Award, the 2007 American Society of Clinical Oncology Statesman Award, the 2015 American Society of Clinical Oncology Distinguished Achievement Award, and the Mastership designation from the American College of Physicians in 2016.
