= Espen Udjus Frorud =

Norwegian cross-country skier

Personal information
- Nationality: Norway
- Born: April 10, 1991 (age 35)

Sport
- Sport: Skiing
- Club: Skiptvet IL

World Cup career
- Seasons: 2 – (2016–2017)
- Indiv. starts: 2
- Indiv. podiums: 0
- Team starts: 0
- Overall titles: 0 – (126th in 2016)
- Discipline titles: 0

Espen Udjus Frorud (born 10 April 1991) is a Norwegian cross-country skier.

He made his World Cup debut in March 2016 in the Holmenkollen 50 km race, also collecting his first World Cup points with a 21st place. His next World Cup outing was the 2017 edition of the same race where he finished 23rd.

He represents the sports club Skiptvet IL.

== Cross-country skiing results ==
All results are sourced from the International Ski Federation (FIS).

=== World Cup ===
==== Season standings ====
Season	Age	Discipline standings			Ski Tour standings			
Season	Age	Overall	Distance	Sprint	Nordic Opening	Tour de Ski	World Cup Final	Ski Tour Canada
2016	24	126	76	—	—	—	—N/a	—
2017	25	140	97	—	—	—	—	—N/a
