= Vegard Bjerkreim Nilsen =

Norwegian cross-country skier

Personal information
- Nationality: Norway
- Born: 2 September 1993 (age 32) Kristiansand, Norway

Sport
- Sport: Skiing
- Club: Lillehammer SK

World Cup career
- Seasons: 3 – (2014–2015, 2017)
- Indiv. starts: 9
- Indiv. podiums: 0
- Team starts: 0
- Team podiums: 0
- Overall titles: 0 – (88th in 2015)
- Discipline titles: 0
- Updated on 16 November 2021

Vegard Bjerkreim Nilsen (born 2 September 1993) is a Norwegian cross-country skier.

He made his World Cup debut in January 2014 in the Nove Mesto sprint, also collecting his first World Cup points with a 19th place. He improved with every World Cup outing, first a 16th place in March 2014 in Drammen, then a 12th place in January 2015 in Otepää, then an 8th place in February 2015 in Östersund. However, he never broke the top 30 again.

He represents the sports club Lillehammer SK. He hails from Kristiansand is a younger brother of Betty Ann Bjerkreim Nilsen.

== Cross-country skiing results ==
All results are sourced from the International Ski Federation (FIS).

=== World Cup ===
==== Season standings ====
Season	Age	Discipline standings				Ski Tour standings		
Season	Age	Overall	Distance	Sprint	U23	Nordic Opening	Tour de Ski	World Cup Final
2014	20	112	—	59	—N/a	—	—	
2015	21	88	—	40	8	—	—	—N/a
2017	23	NC	NC	NC	—N/a	—		
