= Wolfgang Bösl =

German Nordic combined skier (born 1989)

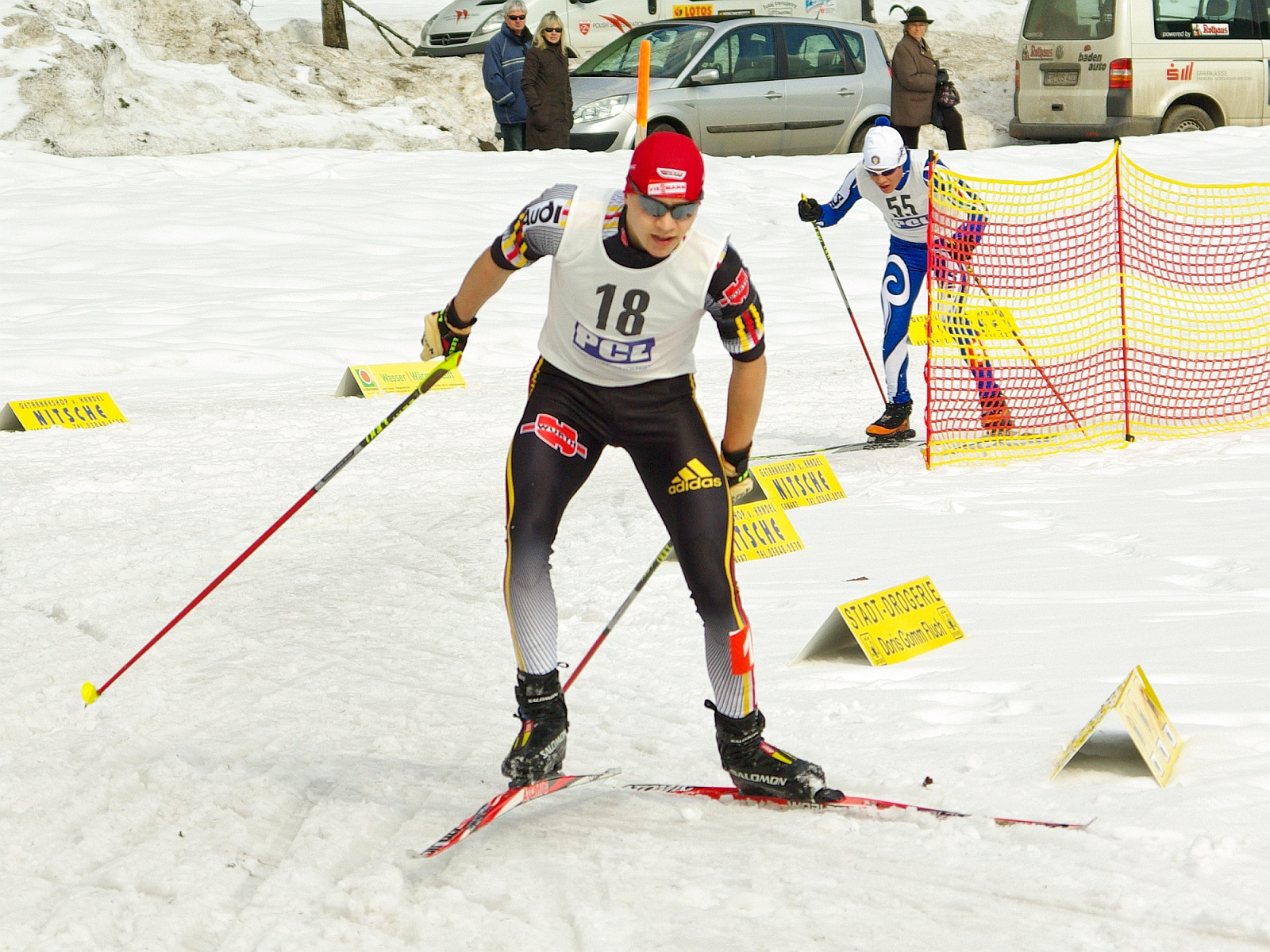
Photo of Wolfgang Bösl in 2008

Wolfgang Bösl (born 1989) is a retired German Nordic combined skier.

He competed at the 2007, 2008 and 2009 Junior World Championships. He won a gold medal in 2008 and a bronze medal in 2009, both in the team competition. His best individual placement was 14th.

He made his Continental Cup debut in December 2008 in Eisenerz and won his first race in February 2014 in Klingenthal. Competing fairly often on the Continental Cup circuit until 2015, he finished on the podium thirteen times in individual competition, including three victories.

He made his World Cup debut in January 2010 in Seefeld in Tirol, at the same time collecting his first World Cup points by finishing 16th. The 2012–13 season became his breakthrough as he again broke the top 20 in December, before improving to 12th and 9th in two races in Almaty. He broke the top 15 on one more occasion, in February 2015 in Val di Fiemme, before his last World Cup outing came in March 2015 in Trondheim.

He represented the sports club SK Berchtesgaden.
