= Tomaz Druml =

Slovenian Nordic combined skier

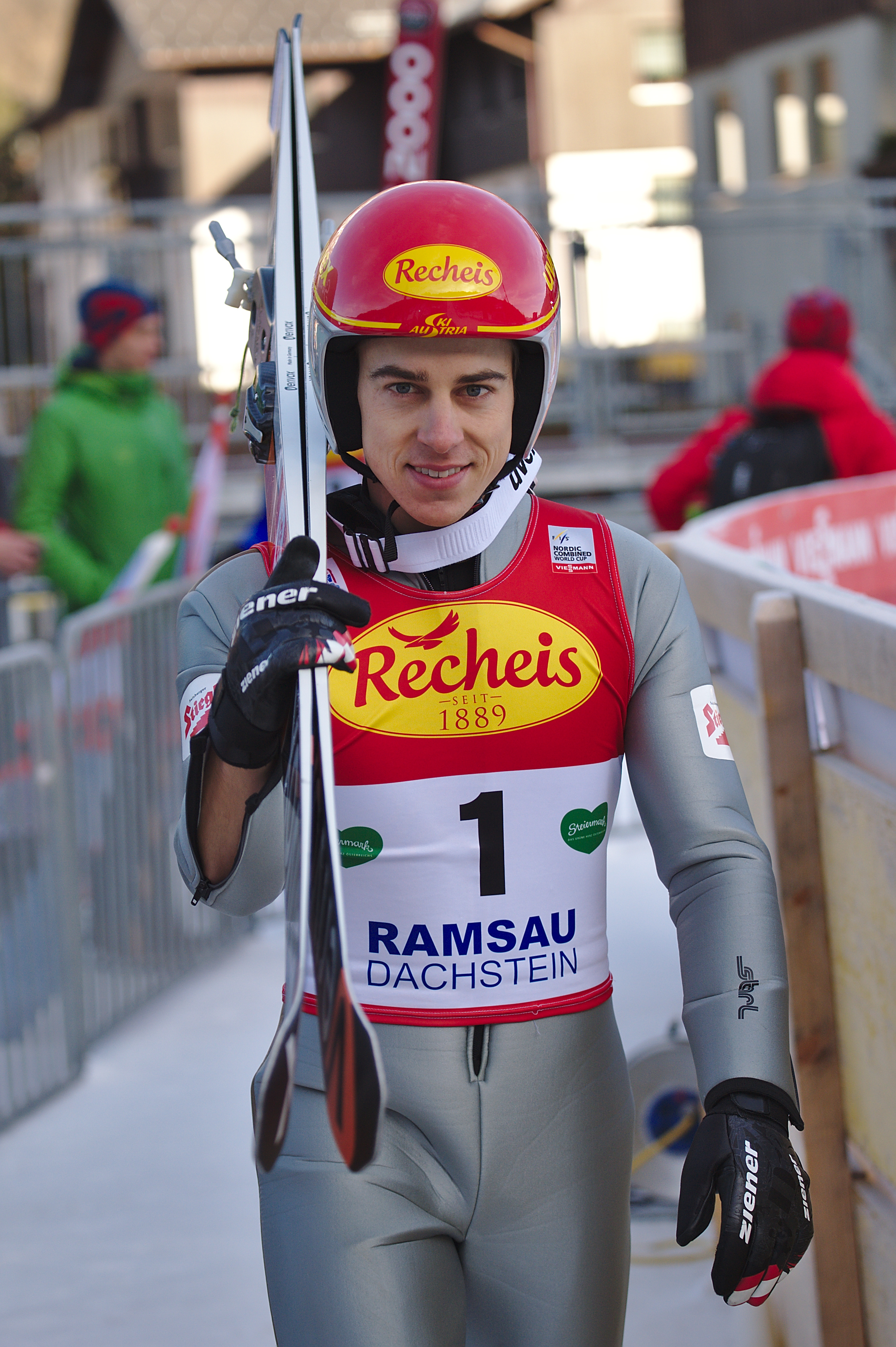

Personal information
- Born: 28 March 1988 (age 38) Feistritz an der Gail, Austria
- Height: 174 cm (5 ft 9 in)

Sport
- Sport: Skiing
- Club: SV Achomitz-Zahomc

World Cup career
- Seasons: 2006–
- Indiv. podiums: 0
- Indiv. wins: 0

Tomaz Druml (born 28 March 1988) is a Slovenian-Austrian Nordic combined skier who has competed since 2003. His best World Cup finish was ninth on three occasions, occurring in 2009 and 2010. He represented Austria until 2017, when he changed his nationality and decided to compete for Slovenia.

Druml has 13 victories in lesser known events.

He was born in Feistritz im Rosental, Carinthia, and he is a member of the local Slovene-speaking minority.
