= Jennie Öberg =

Swedish cross-country skier

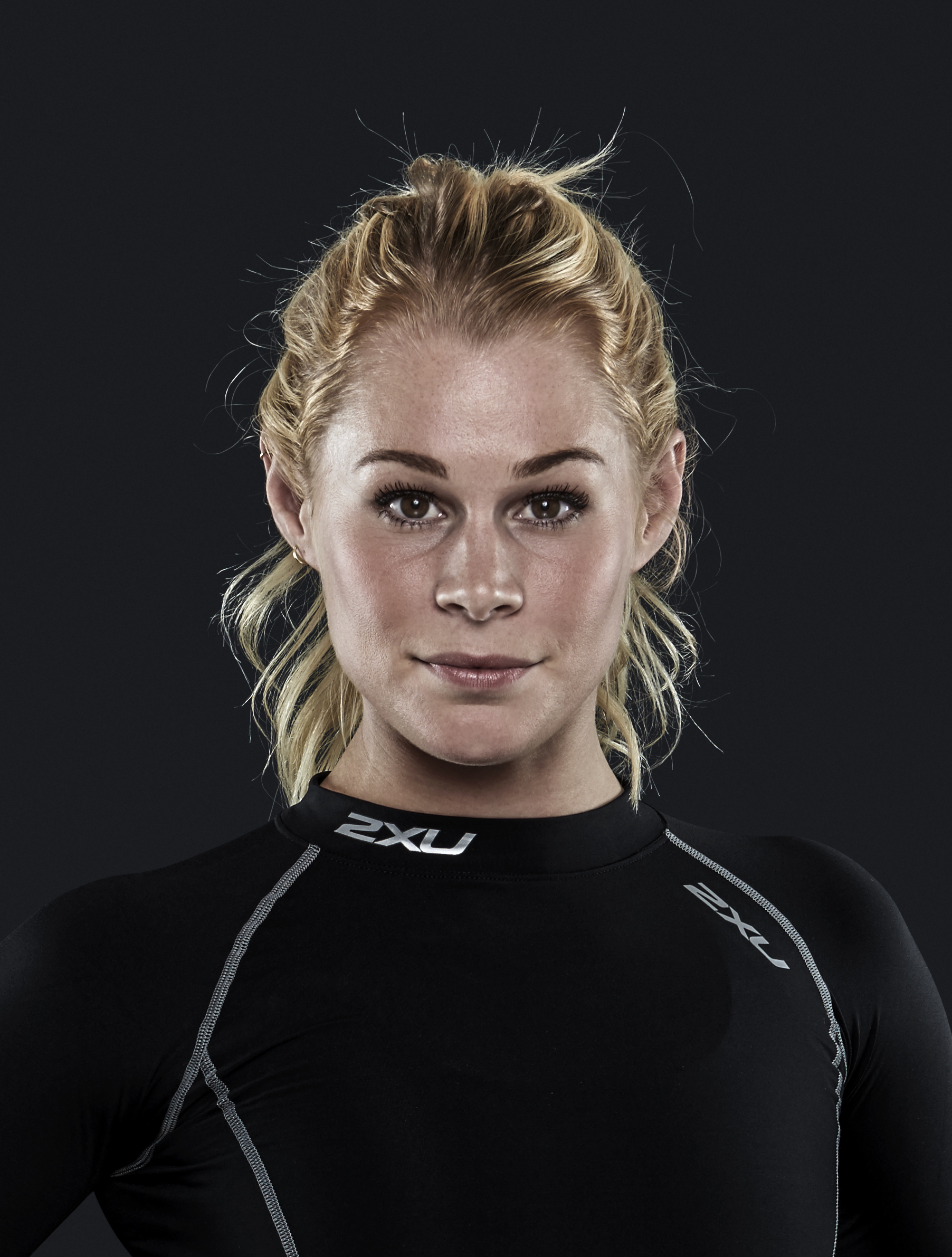
- Jennie Öberg in September 2014

Personal information
- Full name: Eva Jennie Öberg
- Nationality: Sweden
- Born: 4 November 1989 (age 36) Piteå, Sweden

Sport
- Sport: Skiing
- Club: Piteå Elit

World Cup career
- Seasons: 10 – (2011–2020)
- Indiv. starts: 72
- Indiv. podiums: 1
- Indiv. wins: 1
- Team starts: 4
- Team podiums: 0
- Overall titles: 0 – (35th in 2015)
- Discipline titles: 0
Medal record
Women's cross-country skiing
Representing Sweden
U23 World Championships
Bronze medal – third place	2011 Otepää	Individual sprint
Bronze medal – third place	2012 Erzurum	Individual sprint

Jennie Öberg (born November 4, 1989) is a Swedish former cross-country skier.

In January 2015, she won her first and only World Cup race, a freestyle sprint in Rybinsk. Öberg announced her retirement on 13 May 2020.

== Cross-country skiing results ==
All results are sourced from the International Ski Federation (FIS).

=== World Championships ===
Year	Age	10 km individual	15 km skiathlon	30 km mass start	Sprint	4 × 5 km relay	Team sprint
2015	25	37	—	—	—	—	—

=== World Cup ===
==== Season standings ====
Season	Age	Discipline standings			Ski Tour standings				
Season	Age	Overall	Distance	Sprint	Nordic Opening	Tour de Ski	Ski Tour 2020	World Cup Final	Ski Tour Canada
2011	21	63	NC	42	—	—	—N/a	DNF	—N/a
2012	22	NC	NC	NC	74	—	—N/a	—	—N/a
2013	23	82	85	51	—	43	—N/a	—	—N/a
2014	24	66	84	9	—	—	—N/a	—	—N/a
2015	25	35	61	11	—	—	—N/a	—N/a	—N/a
2016	26	42	71	24	51	—	—N/a	—N/a	DNF
2017	27	71	87	39	32	—	—N/a	—	—N/a
2018	28	73	65	68	—	25	—N/a	DNF	—N/a
2019	29	117	—	83	—	—	—N/a	—	—N/a
2020	30	81	—	55	—	—	—	—N/a	—N/a

==== Individual podiums ====
- 1 victory – (1 WC)
- 1 podium – (1 WC)

No.	Season	Date	Location	Race	Level	Place
1	2014–15	24 January 2015	Rybinsk, Russia	1.3 km Sprint F	World Cup	1st
