= Ole Christian Wendel =

Norwegian cross-country skier and ski jumper (born 1992)

Ole Christian Wendel (born 24 January 1992) is a Norwegian former cross-country skier and ski jumper. He was National Junior Champion in both ski jumping, cross country skiing and Nordic combined in 2009, and Junior World Champion in Nordic Combined (team competition).

He represented Norway in Nordic Combined Skiing at the 2010 Winter Olympics in Vancouver.

He retired after the 2011 season.
