= Andrey Gridin =

Bulgarian cross-country skier (born 1988)

Personal information
- Born: 23 June 1988 (age 38) Kazakhstan
Medal record
Cross-country skiing
Representing Bulgaria

Andrey Gridin (born 23 June 1988 in Kazakhstan) is a cross-country skier competing for Bulgaria. He competed for Bulgaria at the 2014 Winter Olympics in the cross-country skiing events, finishing 57th in the 30 km skiathlon and 41st in the 50 km competition.

Gridin originally competed for his native Kazakhstan in biathlon as well until 2012. He applied to get Bulgarian citizenship and has been competing for the country since March 2013.
