= 2014–15 FIS Cross-Country World Cup =

International skiing competition

Discipline	Men	Women
Overall	(Switzerland) Dario Cologna (4th title)	(Norway) Marit Bjørgen (4th title)
Distance	(Switzerland) Dario Cologna	(Norway) Marit Bjørgen
Sprint	(Norway) Finn Hågen Krogh	(Norway) Marit Bjørgen
U-23	(Italy) Francesco De Fabiani	(Sweden) Stina Nilsson
Nations Cup	Norway	Norway
- Nations Cup Overall: Norway

Stage events
Nordic Opening	(Norway) Martin Johnsrud Sundby	(Norway) Marit Bjørgen
Tour de Ski	(Norway) Petter Northug	(Norway) Marit Bjørgen

Competition
Locations	13 venues	13 venues
Individual	26 events	26 events
Relay/Team	1 event	1 event

The 2014–15 FIS Cross-Country World Cup was the 34th official World Cup season in cross-country skiing for men and women. The season started on 29 November 2014 in Ruka, Finland and ended on 15 March 2015 in Oslo, Norway.

The season's biggest event is FIS Nordic World Ski Championships 2015.

== Changed results due to doping violation ==
On 20 July 2016, Martin Johnsrud Sundby was banned from competing in ski competitions for two months by the FIS after having used an asthma medicine incorrectly during the 2014–15 season. He was also stripped of two results; a victory in 15 km C in Davos, 13 December 2014 and a third place in 25 km F Pursuit in Toblach, 8 January 2015. the latter also resulted in Sundby losing the Tour de Ski title. Due to losing a total of 616 points for the affected competitions he also lost the overall World Cup title.

== Calendar ==
=== Men ===
C – Classic / F – Freestyle
WC	Stage	Date	Place	Discipline	Winner	Second	Third	Yellow bib	Ref.
1	1	29 November 2014	(Finland) Ruka	Sprint C	(Norway) Eirik Brandsdal	(Norway) Petter Northug	(Norway) Sondre Turvoll Fossli	(Norway) Eirik Brandsdal	
2	2	30 November 2014	(Finland) Ruka	15 km C	(Finland) Iivo Niskanen	(Norway) Martin Johnsrud Sundby	(Finland) Sami Jauhojärvi	(Norway) Eirik Brandsdal (Finland) Iivo Niskanen	
	3	5 December 2014	(Norway) Lillehammer	Sprint F	(Norway) Pål Golberg	(Russia) Alexei Petukhov	(Norway) Finn Hågen Krogh	(Norway) Eirik Brandsdal	
	4	6 December 2014	(Norway) Lillehammer	10 km F	(Norway) Martin Johnsrud Sundby	(Norway) Finn Hågen Krogh	(Norway) Sjur Røthe	(Norway) Martin Johnsrud Sundby	
	5	7 December 2014	(Norway) Lillehammer	15 km C Pursuit	(Norway) Didrik Tønseth	(Kazakhstan) Alexey Poltoranin	(Norway) Martin Johnsrud Sundby	(Norway) Martin Johnsrud Sundby	
3	5th Nordic Opening Overall (5–7 December 2014)				(Norway) Martin Johnsrud Sundby	(Norway) Finn Hågen Krogh	(Norway) Sjur Røthe	(Norway) Martin Johnsrud Sundby	
4	6	13 December 2014	(Switzerland) Davos	15 km C	(Norway) Didrik Tønseth	(Switzerland) Dario Cologna	(Norway) Sjur Røthe	(Norway) Martin Johnsrud Sundby	
5	7	14 December 2014	(Switzerland) Davos	Sprint F	(Norway) Finn Hågen Krogh	(Norway) Anders Gløersen	(Norway) Eirik Brandsdal	(Norway) Martin Johnsrud Sundby	
6	8	20 December 2014	(Switzerland) Davos	15 km F	(Norway) Anders Gløersen	(Norway) Petter Northug	(Norway) Chris Jespersen	(Norway) Martin Johnsrud Sundby	
7	9	21 December 2014	(Switzerland) Davos	Sprint F	(Italy) Federico Pellegrino	(Russia) Alexei Petukhov	(Norway) Finn Hågen Krogh	(Norway) Martin Johnsrud Sundby	
	10	3 January 2015	(Germany) Oberstdorf	4 km F Prologue	(Switzerland) Dario Cologna	(Sweden) Calle Halfvarsson	(Norway) Petter Northug	(Norway) Martin Johnsrud Sundby	
	11	4 January 2015	(Germany) Oberstdorf	15 km C Pursuit	(Norway) Petter Northug	(Canada) Alex Harvey	(Sweden) Calle Halfvarsson	(Norway) Martin Johnsrud Sundby	
	12	6 January 2015	(Switzerland) Val Mustair	Sprint F	(Italy) Federico Pellegrino	(Norway) Petter Northug	(Norway) Martin Johnsrud Sundby	(Norway) Martin Johnsrud Sundby	
	13	7 January 2015	(Italy) Toblach	10 km C	(Kazakhstan) Alexey Poltoranin	(Russia) Evgeniy Belov	(Norway) Martin Johnsrud Sundby	(Norway) Martin Johnsrud Sundby	
	14	8 January 2015	(Italy) Cortina-Toblach	35 km F Pursuit	(Norway) Petter Northug	(Sweden) Calle Halfvarsson	(Russia) Evgeniy Belov	(Norway) Martin Johnsrud Sundby	
	15	10 January 2015	(Italy) Val di Fiemme	15 km C Mass Start	(Germany) Tim Tscharnke	(Kazakhstan) Alexey Poltoranin	(Switzerland) Dario Cologna	(Norway) Martin Johnsrud Sundby	
	16	11 January 2015	(Italy) Val di Fiemme	9 km F Pursuit	(Italy) Roland Clara	(France) Maurice Manificat	(Switzerland) Toni Livers	(Norway) Martin Johnsrud Sundby	
8	9th Tour de Ski Overall (3–11 January 2015)				(Norway) Petter Northug	(Russia) Evgeniy Belov	(Sweden) Calle Halfvarsson	(Norway) Martin Johnsrud Sundby	
9	17	17 January 2015	(Estonia) Otepää	Sprint C	(Norway) Tomas Northug	(Norway) Ola Vigen Hattestad	(Finland) Toni Ketelä	(Norway) Martin Johnsrud Sundby	
10	18	23 January 2015	(Russia) Rybinsk	15 km F	(Switzerland) Dario Cologna	(Russia) Evgeniy Belov	(Russia) Sergey Ustiugov	(Norway) Martin Johnsrud Sundby	
11	19	24 January 2015	(Russia) Rybinsk	Sprint F	(Italy) Federico Pellegrino	(Russia) Sergey Ustiugov	(Russia) Andrey Parfenov	(Norway) Martin Johnsrud Sundby	
12	20	25 January 2015	(Russia) Rybinsk	30 km Skiathlon	(Russia) Maxim Vylegzhanin	(Switzerland) Dario Cologna	(Finland) Matti Heikkinen	(Norway) Martin Johnsrud Sundby	
13	21	14 February 2015	(Sweden) Östersund	Sprint C	(Norway) Finn Hågen Krogh	(Canada) Alex Harvey	(Norway) Timo André Bakken	(Norway) Martin Johnsrud Sundby	
14	22	15 February 2015	(Sweden) Östersund	15 km F	(Norway) Finn Hågen Krogh	(France) Maurice Manificat	(Sweden) Marcus Hellner	(Norway) Martin Johnsrud Sundby	
FIS Nordic World Ski Championships 2015 (19 February – 1 March)
15	23	7 March 2015	(Finland) Lahti	Sprint F	(Norway) Eirik Brandsdal	(Norway) Sindre Bjørnestad Skar	(France) Richard Jouve	(Norway) Martin Johnsrud Sundby	
16	24	8 March 2015	(Finland) Lahti	15 km C	(Italy) Francesco De Fabiani	(Kazakhstan) Alexey Poltoranin	(Finland) Sami Jauhojärvi	(Norway) Martin Johnsrud Sundby	
17	25	11 March 2015	(Norway) Drammen	Sprint C	(Norway) Eirik Brandsdal	(Norway) Finn Hågen Krogh	(Norway) Ola Vigen Hattestad	(Norway) Martin Johnsrud Sundby	
18	26	14 March 2015	(Norway) Oslo	50 km F Mass Start	(Norway) Sjur Røthe	(Switzerland) Dario Cologna	(Norway) Martin Johnsrud Sundby	(Norway) Martin Johnsrud Sundby	

=== Women ===
WC	Stage	Date	Place	Discipline	Winner	Second	Third	Yellow bib	Ref.
1	1	29 November 2014	(Finland) Ruka	Sprint C	(Norway) Marit Bjørgen	(Slovenia) Katja Višnar	(Norway) Maiken Caspersen Falla	(Norway) Marit Bjørgen	
2	2	30 November 2014	(Finland) Ruka	10 km C	(Norway) Therese Johaug	(Norway) Marit Bjørgen	(Sweden) Charlotte Kalla	(Norway) Marit Bjørgen	
	3	5 December 2014	(Norway) Lillehammer	Sprint F	(Norway) Marit Bjørgen	(Norway) Celine Brun-Lie	(Norway) Heidi Weng	(Norway) Marit Bjørgen	
	4	6 December 2014	(Norway) Lillehammer	5 km F	(Norway) Therese Johaug	(Norway) Marit Bjørgen	(Norway) Heidi Weng	(Norway) Marit Bjørgen	
	5	7 December 2014	(Norway) Lillehammer	10 km C Pursuit	(Norway) Therese Johaug	(Norway) Heidi Weng	(Norway) Marit Bjørgen	(Norway) Marit Bjørgen	
3	5th Nordic Opening Overall (5–7 December 2014)				(Norway) Marit Bjørgen	(Norway) Therese Johaug	(Norway) Heidi Weng	(Norway) Marit Bjørgen	
4	6	13 December 2014	(Switzerland) Davos	10 km C	(Norway) Therese Johaug	(Norway) Marit Bjørgen	(Finland) Kerttu Niskanen	(Norway) Marit Bjørgen	
5	7	14 December 2014	(Switzerland) Davos	Sprint F	(Norway) Ingvild Flugstad Østberg	(Norway) Maiken Caspersen Falla	(Norway) Celine Brun-Lie	(Norway) Marit Bjørgen	
6	8	20 December 2014	(Switzerland) Davos	10 km F	(Norway) Marit Bjørgen	(Germany) Nicole Fessel	(Norway) Heidi Weng	(Norway) Marit Bjørgen	
7	9	21 December 2014	(Switzerland) Davos	Sprint F	(Norway) Marit Bjørgen	(Sweden) Stina Nilsson	(Norway) Ingvild Flugstad Østberg	(Norway) Marit Bjørgen	
	10	3 January 2015	(Germany) Oberstdorf	3 km F Prologue	(Norway) Marit Bjørgen	(Norway) Heidi Weng	(Norway) Ragnhild Haga	(Norway) Marit Bjørgen	
	11	4 January 2015	(Germany) Oberstdorf	10 km C Pursuit	(Norway) Marit Bjørgen	(Norway) Heidi Weng	(Norway) Therese Johaug	(Norway) Marit Bjørgen	
	12	6 January 2015	(Switzerland) Val Mustair	Sprint F	(Norway) Marit Bjørgen	(Norway) Heidi Weng	(Norway) Ingvild Flugstad Østberg	(Norway) Marit Bjørgen	
	13	7 January 2015	(Italy) Toblach	5 km C	(Norway) Marit Bjørgen	(Norway) Therese Johaug	(Norway) Heidi Weng	(Norway) Marit Bjørgen	
	14	8 January 2015	(Italy) Cortina-Toblach	15 km F Pursuit	(Norway) Marit Bjørgen	(Norway) Heidi Weng	(Norway) Therese Johaug	(Norway) Marit Bjørgen	
	15	10 January 2015	(Italy) Val di Fiemme	10 km C Mass Start	(Norway) Therese Johaug	(Norway) Marit Bjørgen	(Norway) Heidi Weng	(Norway) Marit Bjørgen	
	16	11 January 2015	(Italy) Val di Fiemme	9 km F Pursuit	(Norway) Therese Johaug	(Norway) Heidi Weng	(Norway) Marit Bjørgen	(Norway) Marit Bjørgen	
8	9th Tour de Ski Overall (3–11 January 2015)				(Norway) Marit Bjørgen	(Norway) Therese Johaug	(Norway) Heidi Weng	(Norway) Marit Bjørgen	
9	17	17 January 2015	(Estonia) Otepää	Sprint C	(Norway) Ingvild Flugstad Østberg	(Sweden) Stina Nilsson	(Norway) Celine Brun-Lie	(Norway) Marit Bjørgen	
10	18	23 January 2015	(Russia) Rybinsk	10 km F	(Norway) Astrid Uhrenholdt Jacobsen	(United States) Elizabeth Stephen	(Germany) Stefanie Böhler	(Norway) Marit Bjørgen	
11	19	24 January 2015	(Russia) Rybinsk	Sprint F	(Sweden) Jennie Öberg	(Russia) Natalya Matveyeva	(Switzerland) Laurien van der Graaff	(Norway) Marit Bjørgen	
12	20	25 January 2015	(Russia) Rybinsk	15 km Skiathlon	(Norway) Martine Ek Hagen	(Finland) Riitta-Liisa Roponen	(Germany) Stefanie Böhler	(Norway) Marit Bjørgen	
13	21	14 February 2015	(Sweden) Östersund	Sprint C	(Norway) Marit Bjørgen	(Norway) Maiken Caspersen Falla	(Sweden) Stina Nilsson	(Norway) Marit Bjørgen	
14	22	15 February 2015	(Sweden) Östersund	10 km F	(Sweden) Charlotte Kalla	(Norway) Marit Bjørgen	(Norway) Therese Johaug	(Norway) Marit Bjørgen	
FIS Nordic World Ski Championships 2015 (18 February – 1 March)
15	23	7 March 2015	(Finland) Lahti	Sprint F	(Norway) Marit Bjørgen	(Norway) Ingvild Flugstad Østberg	(United States) Kikkan Randall	(Norway) Marit Bjørgen	
16	24	8 March 2015	(Finland) Lahti	10 km C	(Norway) Marit Bjørgen	(Norway) Heidi Weng	(Sweden) Charlotte Kalla	(Norway) Marit Bjørgen	
17	25	11 March 2015	(Norway) Drammen	Sprint C	(Norway) Maiken Caspersen Falla	(Norway) Heidi Weng	(Norway) Marit Bjørgen	(Norway) Marit Bjørgen	
18	26	15 March 2015	(Norway) Oslo	30 km F Mass Start	(Norway) Marit Bjørgen	(Norway) Therese Johaug	(Norway) Astrid Uhrenholdt Jacobsen	(Norway) Marit Bjørgen	

=== Men's team ===
WC	Stage	Date	Place	Discipline	Winner	Second	Third	Ref.
1	1	18 January 2015	(Estonia) Otepää	Team Sprint F	Russia I Alexey Petukhov; Sergey Ustiugov	Norway I Anders Gløersen; Finn Hågen Krogh	Italy Dietmar Nöckeler; Federico Pellegrino	

=== Ladies' team ===
WC	Stage	Date	Place	Discipline	Winner	Second	Third	Ref.
1	1	18 January 2015	(Estonia) Otepää	Team Sprint F	Sweden I Ida Ingemarsdotter; Stina Nilsson	Norway I Maiken Caspersen Falla; Ingvild Flugstad Østberg	Poland Justyna Kowalczyk; Sylwia Jaśkowiec	

== Men's standings ==
=== Overall ===
Rank	after 28 events	Points
1	(Switzerland) Dario Cologna	1103
2	(Norway) Petter Northug	1047
3	(Sweden) Calle Halfvarsson	897
4	(Norway) Finn Hågen Krogh	870
5	(Russia) Evgeniy Belov	868
6	(Norway) Martin Johnsrud Sundby	748
7	(Norway) Niklas Dyrhaug	613
8	(Kazakhstan) Alexey Poltoranin	557
9	(Canada) Alex Harvey	518
10	(Russia) Maxim Vylegzhanin	488

=== Distance ===
Rank	after 16 events	Points
1	(Switzerland) Dario Cologna	821
2	(Norway) Martin Johnsrud Sundby	480
3	(Russia) Evgeniy Belov	457
4	(Sweden) Calle Halfvarsson	411
5	(Norway) Petter Northug	401
6	(Norway) Niklas Dyrhaug	385
7	(Kazakhstan) Alexey Poltoranin	351
8	(Russia) Maxim Vylegzhanin	330
9	(Canada) Alex Harvey	313
10	(France) Maurice Manificat	293

=== Sprint ===
Rank	after 10 events	Points
1	(Norway) Finn Hågen Krogh	479
2	(Norway) Eirik Brandsdal	442
3	(Italy) Federico Pellegrino	376
4	(Russia) Alexey Petukhov	298
5	(Norway) Sondre Turvoll Fossli	267
6	(Russia) Sergey Ustiugov	221
7	(Norway) Tomas Northug	217
8	(Norway) Petter Northug	214
9	(Norway) Ola Vigen Hattestad	204
10	(Norway) Pål Golberg	187

=== Prize money ===
Rank	after 38 payouts	CHF
1	(Norway) Martin Johnsrud Sundby	193,900
2	(Norway) Finn Hågen Krogh	105,250
3	(Norway) Petter Northug	102,125
4	(Switzerland) Dario Cologna	78,812
5	(Norway) Eirik Brandsdal	51,000
6	(Russia) Evgeniy Belov	45,875
7	(Sweden) Calle Halfvarsson	45,600
8	(Italy) Federico Pellegrino	36,250
9	(Norway) Sjur Røthe	32,000
10	(Norway) Anders Gløersen	29,250

=== Helvetia U23 ===
Rank	after 28 events	Points
1	(Italy) Francesco De Fabiani	309
2	(Russia) Sergey Ustiugov	297
3	(Norway) Sondre Turvoll Fossli	267
4	(Finland) Iivo Niskanen	169
5	(Norway) Sindre Bjørnestad Skar	112
6	(Norway) Håvard Solås Taugbøl	106
7	(France) Richard Jouve	72
8	(Norway) Vegard Bjerkreim Nilsen	54
9	(Norway) Martin Løwstrøm Nyenget	50
10	(Norway) Simen Hegstad Krüger	37

=== Audi Quattro Bonus Ranking ===
Rank	after 8 events	Points
1	(Switzerland) Dario Cologna	152
2	(Norway) Petter Northug	128
3	(Russia) Evgeniy Belov	119
4	(Norway) Martin Johnsrud Sundby	117
5	(Sweden) Calle Halfvarsson	97
6	(Italy) Federico Pellegrino	60
7	(France) Robin Duvillard	47
8	(Canada) Alex Harvey	45
9	(Russia) Ilia Chernousov	44
10	(Poland) Maciej Starega	40

== Women's standings ==
=== Overall ===
Rank	after 28 events	Points
1	(Norway) Marit Bjørgen	2172
2	(Norway) Therese Johaug	1388
3	(Norway) Heidi Weng	1332
4	(Norway) Ingvild Flugstad Østberg	894
5	(Norway) Ragnhild Haga	750
6	(Norway) Maiken Caspersen Falla	661
7	(Sweden) Charlotte Kalla	620
8	(Germany) Nicole Fessel	565
9	(Germany) Denise Herrmann	548
10	(United States) Elizabeth Stephen	544

=== Distance ===
Rank	after 16 events	Points
1	(Norway) Marit Bjørgen	962
2	(Norway) Therese Johaug	857
3	(Norway) Heidi Weng	692
4	(Sweden) Charlotte Kalla	426
5	(Norway) Ragnhild Haga	402
6	(Germany) Nicole Fessel	399
7	(United States) Elizabeth Stephen	360
8	(Norway) Martine Ek Hagen	344
9	(Russia) Yuliya Chekalyova	328
10	(Norway) Astrid Uhrenholdt Jacobsen	326

=== Sprint ===
Rank	after 10 events	Points
1	(Norway) Marit Bjørgen	610
2	(Norway) Ingvild Flugstad Østberg	560
3	(Norway) Maiken Caspersen Falla	512
4	(Sweden) Stina Nilsson	345
5	(Norway) Heidi Weng	280
6	(Slovenia) Katja Višnar	260
7	(Norway) Celine Brun-Lie	252
8	(Sweden) Hanna Falk	217
9	(Russia) Natalya Matveyeva	216
10	(Switzerland) Laurien van der Graaff	174

=== Prize money ===
Rank	after 38 payouts	CHF
1	(Norway) Marit Bjørgen	332,650
2	(Norway) Therese Johaug	160,375
3	(Norway) Heidi Weng	109,625
4	(Norway) Ingvild Flugstad Østberg	76,625
5	(Norway) Maiken Caspersen Falla	54,625
6	(Sweden) Stina Nilsson	44,999
7	(Sweden) Charlotte Kalla	38,625
8	(Norway) Ragnhild Haga	32,350
9	(Norway) Astrid Uhrenholdt Jacobsen	28,000
10	(United States) Elizabeth Stephen	24,000

=== Helvetia U23 ===
Rank	after 28 events	Points
1	(Sweden) Stina Nilsson	427
2	(Austria) Teresa Stadlober	247
3	(Switzerland) Nathalie von Siebenthal	131
4	(Czech Republic) Petra Nováková	79
5	(Slovenia) Lea Einfalt	77
6	(Russia) Natalya Zhukova	65
7	(Austria) Nathalie Schwarz	64
8	(Sweden) Sofia Henriksson	51
	(Sweden) Maja Dahlqvist	51
10	(Germany) Victoria Carl	44

=== Audi Quattro Bonus Ranking ===
Rank	after events	Points
1	(Norway) Marit Bjørgen	184
2	(Norway) Heidi Weng	134
3	(Norway) Therese Johaug	127
4	(Norway) Ingvild Flugstad Østberg	52
5	(Sweden) Stina Nilsson	48
6	(Norway) Maiken Caspersen Falla	44
7	(Switzerland) Laurien van der Graaff	42
	(Norway) Ragnhild Haga	42
	(Norway) Astrid Uhrenholdt Jacobsen	42
10	(United States) Sophie Caldwell	40

== Nations Cup ==
=== Overall ===
Rank	after 56 events	Points
1	Norway	17225
2	Russia	5861
3	Sweden	5324
4	Finland	3143
5	Germany	2510
6	Switzerland	2076
7	United States	1836
8	Italy	1649
9	France	1543
10	Poland	862

=== Men ===
Rank	after 28 events	Points
1	Norway	8301
2	Russia	4188
3	Sweden	2093
4	Switzerland	1722
5	Italy	1359
6	Finland	1318
7	France	1112
8	Canada	749
9	Kazakhstan	552
10	Germany	393

=== Women ===
Rank	after 28 events	Points
1	Norway	8924
2	Sweden	3231
3	Germany	2117
4	Finland	1825
5	Russia	1673
6	United States	1573
7	Poland	745
8	Slovenia	649
9	France	431
10	Czech Republic	415

== Points distribution ==
The table shows the number of points won in the 2014/15 Cross-Country Skiing World Cup for men and women.

Place	1	2	3	4	5	6	7	8	9	10	11	12	13	14	15	16	17	18	19	20	21	22	23	24	25	26	27	28	29	30
Individual	100	80	60	50	45	40	36	32	29	26	24	22	20	18	16	15	14	13	12	11	10	9	8	7	6	5	4	3	2	1
Team Sprint	100	80	60	50	45	40	36	32	29	26	24	22	20	18	16	15	14	13	12	11	10	9	8	7	6	5	4	3	2	1
Nordic Opening	200	160	120	100	90	80	72	64	58	52	48	44	40	36	32	30	28	26	24	22	20	18	16	14	12	10	8	6	4	2
World Cup Final	200	160	120	100	90	80	72	64	58	52	48	44	40	36	32	30	28	26	24	22	20	18	16	14	12	10	8	6	4	2
Relay	200	160	120	100	90	80	72	64	58	52	48	44	40	36	32	30	28	26	24	22	20	18	16	14	12	10	8	6	4	2
Tour de Ski	400	320	240	200	180	160	144	128	116	104	96	88	80	72	64	60	56	52	48	44	40	36	32	28	24	20	16	12	8	4
Stage Nordic Opening	50	46	43	40	37	34	32	30	28	26	24	22	20	18	16	15	14	13	12	11	10	9	8	7	6	5	4	3	2	1
Stage Tour de Ski	50	46	43	40	37	34	32	30	28	26	24	22	20	18	16	15	14	13	12	11	10	9	8	7	6	5	4	3	2	1
Stage World Cup Final	50	46	43	40	37	34	32	30	28	26	24	22	20	18	16	15	14	13	12	11	10	9	8	7	6	5	4	3	2	1
Bonus points	15	12	10	8	6	5	4	3	2	1

A skier's best results in all distance races and sprint races counts towards the overall World Cup totals.

All distance races, included individual stages in Tour de Ski and in World Cup Final (which counts as 50% of a normal race), count towards the distance standings. All sprint races, including the sprint races during the Tour de Ski and the first race of the World Cup final (which counts as 50% of a normal race), count towards the sprint standings.

In mass start races bonus points are awarded to the first 10 at each bonus station.

The Nations Cup ranking is calculated by adding each country's individual competitors' scores and scores from team events. Relay events count double, with only one team counting towards the total, while in team sprint events two teams contribute towards the total, with the usual World Cup points (100 to winning team, etc.) awarded.

== Achievements ==
WC stage events are not included. Only individual events.

First World Cup career victory

Men

- (Finland) Iivo Niskanen, 22, in his 5th season – the WC 2 (15 km C) in Ruka; also first podium
- (Norway) Didrik Tønseth, 23, in his 4th season – the WC 2 (15 km C Pursuit) in Lillehammer; first podium was 2013–14 WC 4 (15 km C) in Lillehammer
- (Norway) Finn Hågen Krogh, 24, in his 5th season – the WC 5 (Sprint F) in Davos; first podium was 2012–13 WC 14 (Sprint F) in Lahti
- (Italy) Federico Pellegrino, 24, in his 6th season – the WC 7 (Sprint F) in Davos; first podium was 2010–11 WC 8 (Sprint F) in Liberec
- (Italy) Roland Clara, 32, in his 11th season – the WC 8 (9 km F Pursuit) in Val di Fiemme; first podium was 2010–11 WC 7 (9 km F Pursuit) in Val di Fiemme
- (Norway) Tomas Northug, 24, in his 6th season – the WC 9 (Sprint C) in Otepää; also first podium
- (Italy) Francesco De Fabiani, 21, in his 2nd season – the WC 16 (15 km C) in Lahti; also first podium
- (Norway) Sjur Røthe, 26, in his 7th season – the WC 18 (50 km F) in Oslo; first podium was 2012-13 WC 4 (15 km C) in Canmore

Women

- (Sweden) Jennie Öberg, 25, in her 5th season – the WC 11 (Sprint F) in Rybinsk; also first podium
- (Norway) Martine Ek Hagen, 23, in her 5th season – the WC 12 (Skiathlon) in Rybinsk; also first podium

First World Cup podium

Men

- (Norway) Sondre Turvoll Fossli, 21, in his 5th season – no. 3 in the WC 1 (Sprint C) in Ruka
- (Finland) Iivo Niskanen, 22, in his 5th season – no. 1 in the WC 2 (15 km C) in Ruka
- (Finland) Toni Ketelä, 26, in his 5th season – no. 3 in the WC 9 (Sprint C) in Otepää
- (Norway) Tomas Northug, 24, in his 6th season – no. 1 in the WC 9 (Sprint C) in Otepää
- (Russia) Andrey Parfenov, 27, in his 8th season – no. 3 in the WC 11 (Sprint F) in Rybinsk
- (Norway) Timo André Bakken, 25, in his 8th season – no. 3 in the WC 13 (Sprint C) in Östersund
- (Norway) Sindre Bjørnestad Skar, 23, in his 5th season – no. 2 in the WC 15 (Sprint F) in Lahti
- (France) Richard Jouve, 20, in his 1st season – no. 3 in the WC 15 (Sprint F) in Lahti
- (Italy) Francesco De Fabiani, 21, in his 2nd season – no. 1 in the WC 16 (15 km C) in Lahti

Women

- (Sweden) Jennie Öberg, 25, in her 5th season – no. 1 in the WC 11 (Sprint F) in Rybinsk
- (Norway) Martine Ek Hagen, 23, in her 5th season – no. 1 in the WC 12 (Skiathlon) in Rybinsk

Victories in this World Cup (all-time number of victories as of 2014/15 season in parentheses)

Men

- (Norway) Petter Northug, 3 (37) first places
- (Norway) Eirik Brandsdal, 3 (8) first places
- (Norway) Finn Hågen Krogh, 3 (6) first places
- (Italy) Federico Pellegrino, 3 (3) first places
- (Switzerland) Dario Cologna, 2 (21) first place
- (Norway) Martin Johnsrud Sundby, 2 (10) first places
- (Norway) Didrik Tønseth, 2 (2) first places
- (Kazakhstan) Alexey Poltoranin, 1 (8) first place
- (Norway) Anders Gløersen, 1 (5) first place
- (Russia) Maxim Vylegzhanin, 1 (6) first place
- (Norway) Pål Golberg, 1 (3) first place
- (Germany) Tim Tscharnke, 1 (2) first place
- (Finland) Iivo Niskanen, 1 (1) first place
- (Norway) Tomas Northug, 1 (1) first place
- (Italy) Francesco De Fabiani, 1 (1) first place
- (Norway) Sjur Røthe, 1 (1) first place
- (Italy) Roland Clara, 1 (1) first place

Women

- (Norway) Marit Bjørgen, 15 (102) first places
- (Norway) Therese Johaug, 6 (25) first places
- (Norway) Ingvild Flugstad Østberg, 2 (3) first places
- (Sweden) Charlotte Kalla, 1 (4) first place
- (Norway) Maiken Caspersen Falla, 1 (4) first place
- (Norway) Astrid Uhrenholdt Jacobsen, 1 (5) first place
- (Sweden) Jennie Öberg, 1 (1) first place
- (Norway) Martine Ek Hagen, 1 (1) first place

== Retirements ==
Following are notable cross-country skiers who announced their retirement:

Men

- Giorgio Di Centa (ITA)
- Cyril Gaillard (FRA)
- Sebastian Gazurek (POL)
- Maciej Kreczmer (POL)
- Anders Södergren (SWE)

Women

- Celine Brun-Lie (NOR)
- Perianne Jones (CAN)
- Claudia Nystad (GER)
- Riikka Sarasoja-Lilja (FIN)
- Kristin Størmer Steira (NOR)
