= 2010 Nordic Opening =

First edition of the Nordic Opening

2010–11 FIS Cross-Country World Cup

Ski tour details
- Venue(s): Ruka, Finland
- Dates: 26–28 November
- Stages: 3: Sprint C 5/10 km C 10/15 km F Pursuit

Results
Men
	Winner	Alexander Legkov (RUS)
	Second	Dario Cologna (SUI)
	Third	Daniel Rickardsson (SWE)
Women
	Winner	Marit Bjørgen (NOR)
	Second	Justyna Kowalczyk (POL)
	Third	Charlotte Kalla (SWE)

The 2010 Nordic Opening or the first Ruka Triple was the first edition of the Nordic Opening, an annual cross-country skiing event. The three-day event was the second competition round of the 2010–11 FIS Cross-Country World Cup, after Gällivare, Sweden.

== World Cup points distribution ==
The winners of the overall standings were awarded 200 World Cup points and the winners of each of the three stages were awarded 50 World Cup points.

Nordic Opening Overall
Position	1	2	3	4	5	6	7	8	9	10	11	12	13	14	15	16	17	18	19	20	21	22	23	24	25	26	27	28	29	30
Points	200	160	120	100	90	80	72	64	58	52	48	44	40	36	32	30	28	26	24	22	20	18	16	14	12	10	8	6	4	2

Nordic Overall Stage
Position	1	2	3	4	5	6	7	8	9	10	11	12	13	14	15	16	17	18	19	20	21	22	23	24	25	26	27	28	29	30
Points	50	46	43	40	37	34	32	30	28	26	24	22	20	18	16	15	14	13	12	11	10	9	8	7	6	5	4	3	2	1

A total of 350 points was possible to achieve if one athlete won all three stages and the overall standings.

== Overall standings ==
Men's overall standings (1–10)
Rank	Name	Time
1	Alexander Legkov (RUS)	1:05:17.1
2	Dario Cologna (SUI)	+10.1
3	Daniel Rickardsson (SWE)	+14.2
4	Marcus Hellner (SWE)	+20.1
5	Maxim Vylegzhanin (RUS)	+22.7
6	Ilia Chernousov (RUS)	+25.0
7	Johan Olsson (SWE)	+28.4
8	Petr Sedov (RUS)	+29.4
9	Lukáš Bauer (CZE)	+29.8
10	Devon Kershaw (CAN)	+30.3

Women's overall standings (1–10)
Rank	Name	Time
1	Marit Bjørgen (NOR)	44:34.3
2	Justyna Kowalczyk (POL)	+33.6
3	Charlotte Kalla (SWE)	+45.7
4	Nicole Fessel (GER)	+1:19.3
5	Yuliya Chekalyova (RUS)	+1:21.1
6	Vibeke Skofterud (NOR)	+1:25.5
7	Petra Majdič (SLO)	+1:30.6
8	Marianna Longa (ITA)	+1:38.1
9	Arianna Follis (ITA)	+1:54.6
10	Therese Johaug (NOR)	+1:58.6

== Overall leadership by stage ==
Overall leadership by stage
Stage	Men		Women	
Stage	Winner	Overall standings	Winner	Overall standings
1	John Kristian Dahl	John Kristian Dahl	Marit Bjørgen	Marit Bjørgen
2	Dario Cologna	Emil Jönsson	Marit Bjørgen	Marit Bjørgen
3	Lukáš Bauer	Alexander Legkov	Therese Johaug	Marit Bjørgen
Final		Alexander Legkov	Final	Marit Bjørgen
