= Evgeniy Belov =

Russian cross-country skier

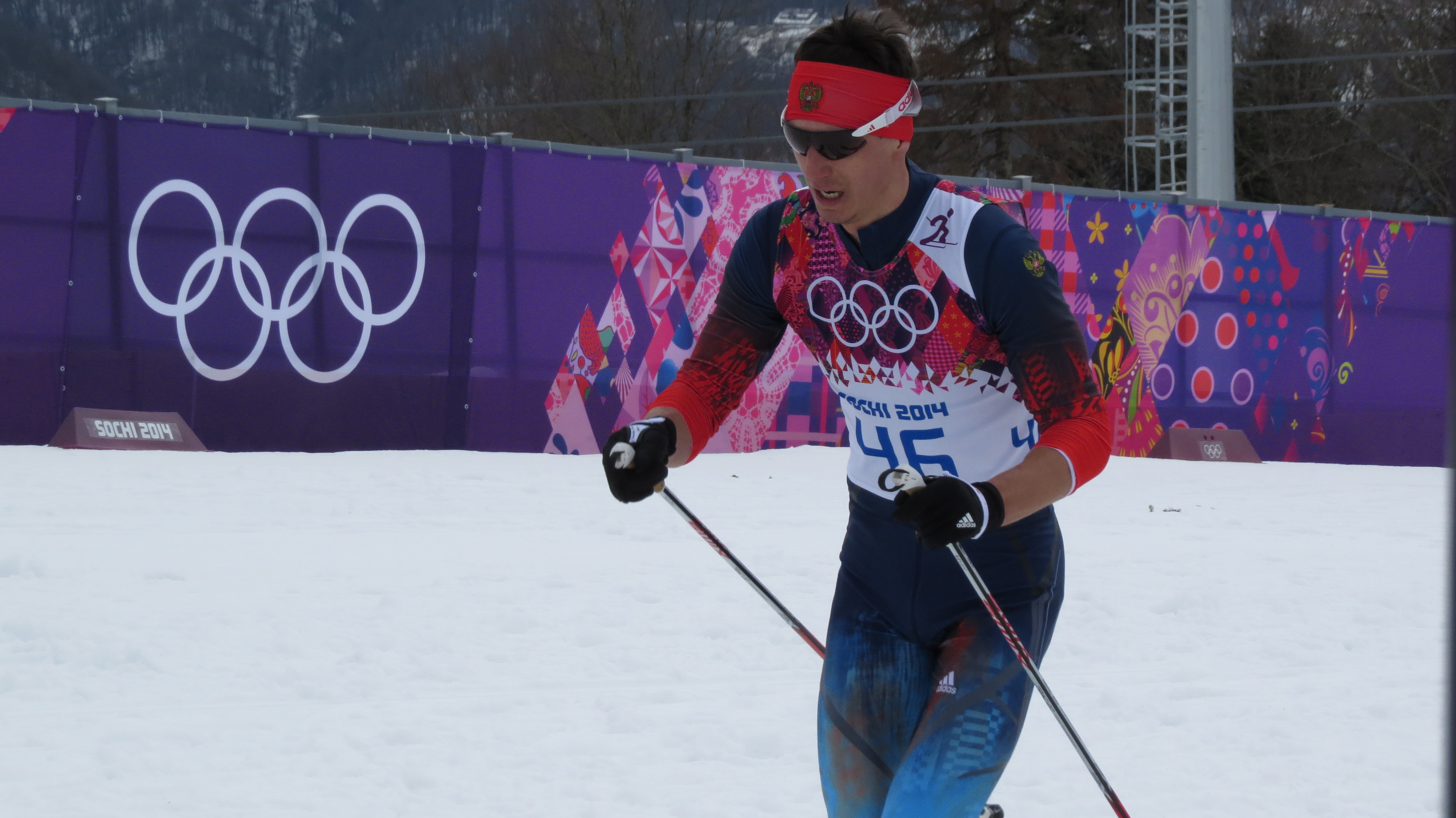
- Belov in 2014

Personal information
- Full name: Evgeniy Nikolayevich Belov
- Nationality: Russia
- Born: 7 August 1990 (age 35) Oktyabrsky, Sverdlovsk Oblast, Russian SFSR, Soviet Union

Sport
- Sport: Skiing

World Cup career
- Seasons: 12 – (2011–2022)
- Indiv. starts: 138
- Indiv. podiums: 8
- Indiv. wins: 1
- Team starts: 13
- Team podiums: 9
- Team wins: 3
- Overall titles: 0 – (5th in 2015)
- Discipline titles: 0
Medal record
Men's cross-country skiing
Representing Russia
World Championships
Bronze medal – third place	2013 Val di Fiemme	4 × 10 km relay
U23 World Championships
Gold medal – first place	2011 Otepää	15 km freestyle
Gold medal – first place	2012 Erzurum	15 km classical
Silver medal – second place	2011 Otepää	30 km skiathlon
Silver medal – second place	2012 Erzurum	Individual sprint
Silver medal – second place	2012 Erzurum	30 km skiathlon
Silver medal – second place	2013 Liberec	15 km freestyle
Silver medal – second place	2013 Liberec	30 km skiathlon
Bronze medal – third place	2013 Liberec	Individual sprint
Junior World Championships
Silver medal – second place	2010 Hinterzarten	10 km classical
Silver medal – second place	2010 Hinterzarten	4 × 5 km relay
- Updated on 10 January 2023

Evgeniy Nikolayevich Belov (Russian: Евгений Николаевич Белов; born 7 August 1990) is a cross-country skier from Russia.

== Career ==
He competed for Russia at the 2014 Winter Olympics in the cross-country skiing events.

In December 2016, the International Ski Federation (FIS) provisionally suspended six Russian cross-country skiers linked to doping violations during the 2014 Winter Olympics, including Evgeniy Belov. On 1 November 2017, Belov became one of two Russian athletes, the other being Alexander Legkov, sanctioned by the International Olympic Committee (IOC). He was officially disqualified from the 2014 Winter Olympics.

== Cross-country skiing results ==
All results are sourced from the International Ski Federation (FIS).

=== Olympic Games ===
Year	Age	15 km individual	30 km skiathlon	50 km mass start	Sprint	4 × 10 km relay	Team sprint
2014	23	25	18	—	—	—	—

=== World Championships ===
- 1 medal – (1 bronze)

Year	Age	15 km individual	30 km skiathlon	50 km mass start	Sprint	4 × 10 km relay	Team sprint
2011	20	37	—	—	37	—	—
2013	22	—	11	—	—	Bronze	—
2015	24	10	8	—	—	4	—
2019	28	—	17	25	—	—	—
2021	30	—	23	19	—	—	—

=== World Cup ===
==== Season standings ====
Season	Age	Discipline standings			Ski Tour standings				
Season	Age	Overall	Distance	Sprint	Nordic Opening	Tour de Ski	Ski Tour 2020	World Cup Final	Ski Tour Canada
2011	20	31	25	86	11	—	—N/a	17	—N/a
2012	21	32	26	89	7	—	—N/a	23	—N/a
2013	22	16	12	99	10	—	—N/a	10	—N/a
2014	23	38	24	55	24	—	—N/a	20	—N/a
2015	24	5	3rd place, bronze medalist(s)	43	13	2nd place, silver medalist(s)	—N/a	—N/a	—N/a
2016	25	18	14	NC	34	11	—N/a	—N/a	21
2017	26	110	70	—	—	—	—N/a	—	—N/a
2018	27	42	35	NC	12	—	—N/a	22	—N/a
2019	28	26	14	84	—	—	—N/a	—	—N/a
2020	29	36	27	90	—	—	12	—N/a	—N/a
2021	30	7	5	33	8	6	—N/a	—N/a	—N/a
2022 (Note: On 1 March 2022, following the 2022 Russian invasion of Ukraine, FIS decided to not allow athletes from Russian and Belarus to take part in FIS competitions, with an immediate effect.)	31	NC	NC	—	—N/a	—	—N/a	—N/a	—N/a

==== Individual podiums ====
- 1 victory – (1 WC, 0 SWC)
- 8 podiums – (4 WC, 4 SWC)

No.	Season	Date	Location	Race	Level	Place
1	2013–14	19 January 2014	Szklarska Poręba, Poland	15 km Mass Start C	World Cup	2nd
2	2014–15	7 January 2015	Toblach, Italy	10 km Individual C	Stage World Cup	2nd
3	2014–15	8 January 2015	Toblach, Italy	25 km Pursuit F	Stage World Cup	3rd
4	2014–15	3–8 January 2015	(Germany) (Switzerland) (Italy) Tour de Ski	Overall Standings	World Cup	2nd
5	2014–15	23 January 2015	Rybinsk, Russia	15 km Individual F	World Cup	2nd
6	2015–16	11 March 2016	Canmore, Canada	15 km Individual F	Stage World Cup	2nd
7	2018–19	16 December 2018	Davos, Switzerland	15 km Individual F	World Cup	1st
8	2020–21	6 January 2021	Toblach, Italy	15 km Pursuit C	Stage World Cup	3rd

==== Team podiums ====
- 3 victories – (3 RL)
- 9 podiums – (9 RL)

No.	Season	Date	Location	Race	Level	Place	Teammates
1	2010–11	21 November 2010	Gällivare, Sweden	4 × 10 km Relay C/F	World Cup	2nd	Vylegzhanin / Sedov / Legkov
2	2010–11	19 December 2010	La Clusaz, France	4 × 10 km Relay C/F	World Cup	2nd	Legkov / Sedov / Vylegzhanin
3	2010–11	6 February 2011	Rybinsk, Russia	4 × 10 km Relay C/F	World Cup	1st	Vylegzhanin / Sedov / Legkov
4	2012–13	25 November 2012	Gällivare, Sweden	4 × 7.5 km Relay C/F	World Cup	3rd	Vylegzhanin / Legkov / Chernousov
5	2015–16	24 January 2016	Nové Město, Czech Republic	4 × 7.5 km Relay C/F	World Cup	2nd	Legkov / Chervotkin / Ustiugov
6	2016–17	18 December 2016	La Clusaz, France	4 × 7.5 km Relay C/F	World Cup	2nd	Legkov / Chervotkin / Ustiugov
7	2018–19	9 December 2018	Beitostølen, Norway	4 × 7.5 km Relay C/F	World Cup	2nd	Bolshunov / Spitsov / Melnichenko
8	2018–19	27 January 2019	Ulricehamn, Sweden	4 × 7.5 km Relay C/F	World Cup	1st	Bessmertnykh / Spitsov / Maltsev
9	2019–20	8 December 2019	Lillehammer, Norway	4 × 7.5 km Relay C/F	World Cup	1st	Yakimushkin / Poroshkin / Ustiugov
