= Fabio Pasini =

Italian cross-country skier

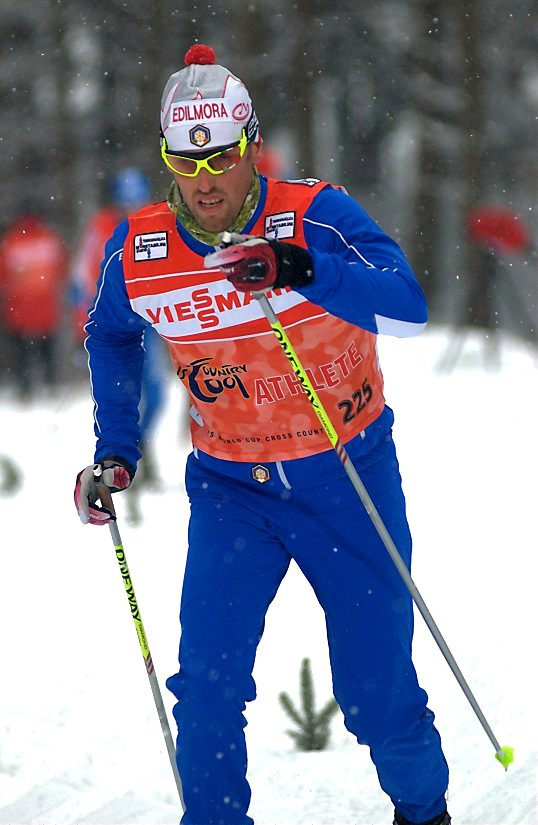
- Fabio Pasini in 2010

Personal information
- Nationality: Italy
- Born: 23 August 1980 (age 45) Gazzaniga, Italy

Sport
- Sport: Skiing
- Club: C.S. Esercito

World Cup career
- Seasons: 15 (2001, 2003–2007, 2009–2014, 2016–2018)
- Indiv. starts: 106
- Indiv. podiums: 1
- Indiv. wins: 0
- Team starts: 19
- Team podiums: 3
- Team wins: 0
- Overall titles: 0 – (36th in 2009)
- Discipline titles: 0

Fabio Pasini (born 23 August 1980) is an Italian cross-country skier who has competed since 2000. He finished 24th in the individual sprint event at the 2010 Winter Olympics in Vancouver. He is born in Gazzaniga.

Pasini's best finish at the FIS Nordic World Ski Championships was 17th in the individual sprint event at Liberec in 2009. His best World Cup finish was second in a team sprint event at Whistler Olympic Park on 18 January 2009. In 2010, he placed third in the free style sprint event of the Italian men's championships of cross-country skiing.

His is the younger brother of cross-country skier Renato Pasini.

== Cross-country skiing results ==
All results are sourced from the International Ski Federation (FIS).

=== Olympic Games ===
| Year | Age | 15 km individual | 30 km skiathlon | 50 km mass start | Sprint | 4 × 10 km relay | Team sprint |
|---|---|---|---|---|---|---|---|
| 2010 | 29 | — | — | — | 24 | — | — |
| 2014 | 33 | 48 | — | — | — | — | — |

=== World Championships ===
| Year | Age | 15 km individual | 30 km skiathlon | 50 km mass start | Sprint | 4 × 10 km relay | Team sprint |
|---|---|---|---|---|---|---|---|
| 2005 | 24 | — | — | — | 23 | — | — |
| 2009 | 28 | — | — | — | 17 | — | — |
| 2013 | 32 | — | — | — | 10 | — | — |

=== World Cup ===
==== Season standings ====
| Season | Age | Discipline standings | | | Ski Tour standings | | | |
| Season | Age | Overall | Distance | Sprint | Nordic Opening | Tour de Ski | World Cup Final | Ski Tour Canada |
|---|---|---|---|---|---|---|---|---|
| 2001 | 21 | NC | —N/a | NC | —N/a | —N/a | —N/a | —N/a |
| 2003 | 23 | NC | —N/a | NC | —N/a | —N/a | —N/a | —N/a |
| 2004 | 24 | 145 | — | 67 | —N/a | —N/a | —N/a | —N/a |
| 2005 | 25 | 104 | NC | 53 | —N/a | —N/a | —N/a | —N/a |
| 2006 | 26 | NC | — | NC | —N/a | —N/a | —N/a | —N/a |
| 2007 | 27 | NC | NC | — | —N/a | — | —N/a | —N/a |
| 2009 | 29 | 36 | 35 | 14 | —N/a | 34 | 49 | —N/a |
| 2010 | 30 | 67 | 119 | 26 | —N/a | 32 | — | —N/a |
| 2011 | 31 | 138 | NC | 82 | DNF | — | — | —N/a |
| 2012 | 32 | 41 | 43 | 27 | — | 20 | 33 | —N/a |
| 2013 | 33 | 82 | 76 | 59 | 46 | DNF | — | —N/a |
| 2014 | 34 | NC | NC | NC | 64 | DNF | — | —N/a |
| 2016 | 36 | NC | NC | NC | — | — | —N/a | — |
| 2017 | 37 | NC | NC | NC | — | — | — | —N/a |
| 2018 | 34 | NC | NC | — | — | — | — | —N/a |

==== Individual podiums ====
- 1 podium – (1 WC)

| No. | Season | Date | Location | Race | Level | Place |
|---|---|---|---|---|---|---|
| 1 | 2008–09 | 20 December 2008 | Düsseldorf, Germany | 1.5 km Sprint F | World Cup | 3rd |

==== Team podiums ====
- 3 podiums – (3 TS)

| No. | Season | Date | Location | Race | Level | Place | Teammate |
|---|---|---|---|---|---|---|---|
| 1 | 2008–09 | 18 January 2009 | Whistler, Canada | 6 x 1.6 km Team Sprint | World Cup | 2nd | R. Pasini |
| 2 | 2009–10 | 24 January 2010 | Rybinsk, Russia | 6 x 1.3 km Team Sprint | World Cup | 2nd | Frasnelli |
| 3 | 2010–11 | 5 December 2010 | Düsseldorf, Germany | 6 x 1.6 km Team Sprint | World Cup | 3rd | Hofer |
