= Nordic skiing at the 2014 Winter Olympics =

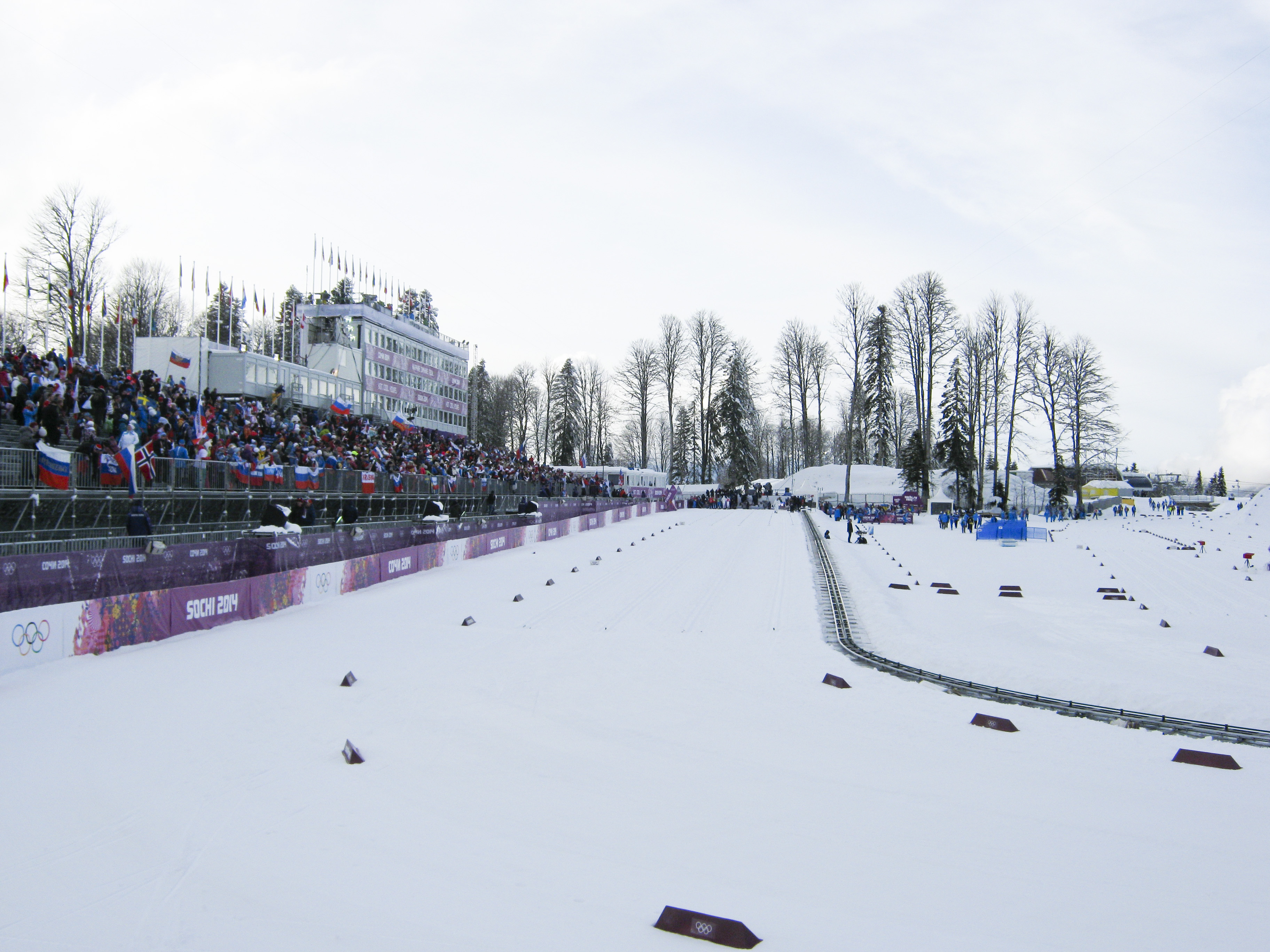
Laura Ski Complex. Few minutes after finish of men's team sprint event. February 19, 2014

At the 2014 Winter Olympics, nineteen Nordic skiing events were contested – twelve cross-country skiing events, four ski jumping events, and three Nordic combined events.

== See also ==
- Cross-country skiing at the 2014 Winter Olympics
- Ski jumping at the 2014 Winter Olympics
- Nordic combined at the 2014 Winter Olympics
