= Alexander Legkov =

Russian cross-country skier

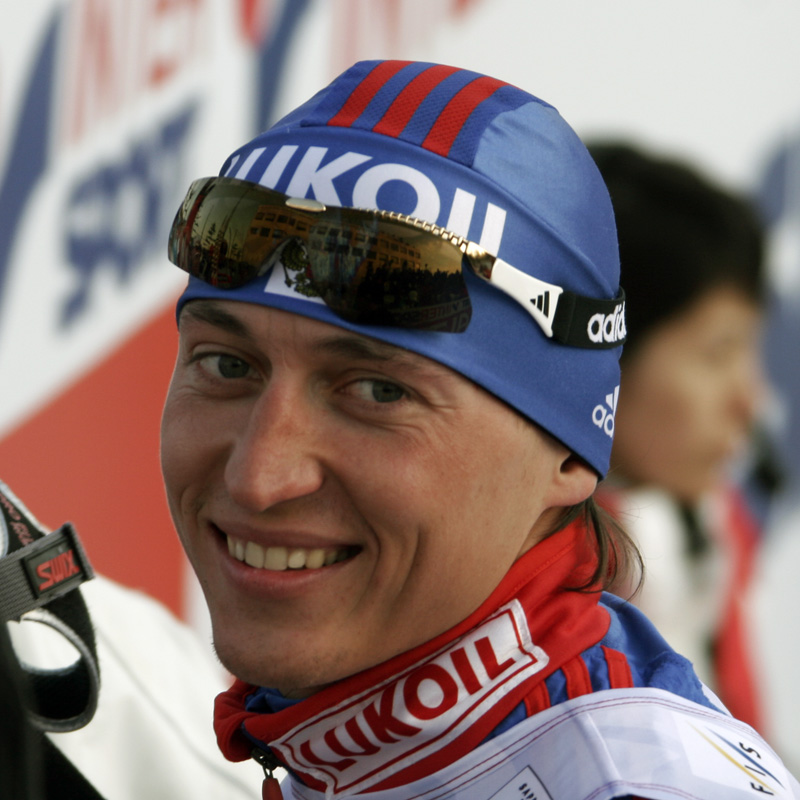
- Aleksandr Legkov at the World Championships 2007 in Sapporo, Japan

Personal information
- Full name: Alexander Gennadiyevich Legkov
- Nationality: Russian
- Born: 7 May 1983 (age 43) Krasnoarmeysk, Russian SFSR, Soviet Union
- Height: 1.77 m (5 ft 10 in)

Sport
- Sport: Skiing
- Club: Dinamo

World Cup career
- Seasons: 15 – (2003–2017)
- Indiv. starts: 212
- Indiv. podiums: 35
- Indiv. wins: 9
- Team starts: 30
- Team podiums: 12
- Team wins: 3
- Overall titles: 0 – (2nd in 2007, 2013, 2014)
- Discipline titles: 1 – (1 DI: 2013)
Medal record
Men's cross-country skiing
Representing Russia
Event	1st	2nd	3rd
Olympic Games	1	1	0
World Championships	0	1	1
Total	1	2	1
Olympic Games
Gold medal – first place	2014 Sochi	50 km freestyle
Silver medal – second place	2014 Sochi	4 ×10 km relay
World Championships
Silver medal – second place	2007 Sapporo	4 ×10 km relay
Bronze medal – third place	2013 Val di Fiemme	4 ×10 km relay
U23 World Championships
Gold medal – first place	2006 Kranj	30 km skiathlon
Bronze medal – third place	2006 Kranj	15 km classical
- Updated on 2 April 2019

Alexander Gennadiyevich Legkov (Russian: Алекса́ндр Геннáдьевич Легков; born 7 May 1983) is a retired Russian cross-country skier who competed internationally between 2002 and 2017. He has five individual World Cup victories including one Tour de Ski title, as well as gold and silver medals at the 2014 Winter Olympics.

== Biography ==
Legkov participated in three Winter Olympic Games (2006, 2010, 2014). He finished fourth after a strong final push to catch then-leader Johan Olsson of Sweden at the 2010 Winter Olympics' 30 km double pursuit. Olsson finished in third place with Legkov 1.2 seconds behind. Legkov's next best result was eight in the 4 × 10 km relay at the 2010 Games in Vancouver.

In 2014 Winter Olympics in Sochi Legkov won the gold medal in the 50 km freestyle, and the silver medal in the 4 × 10 km relay.

Legkov was second behind Germany's Tobias Angerer in the 2006–07 World Cup.

He earned a silver in the 4 × 10 km relay and finished twice in sixth place (15 km, 15 km + 15 km double pursuit) at the FIS Nordic World Ski Championship in Sapporo in 2007.

Alexander Legkov was Total winner of Tour de Ski 2012–13 when he defeated Dario Cologna, Maxim Vylegzhanin and Petter Northug racing up Alpe Cermis on 6 January 2013.

On 6 April 2018, Legkov announced his retirement from sport during his participation at the competition "Sports Elite" in Khanty-Mansiysk.

=== Doping case ===
In December 2016, the International Ski Federation provisionally suspended six Russian cross-country skiers linked to doping violations during the 2014 Winter Olympics, including Legkov. In November 2017, Legkov was disqualified for doping offences by the International Olympic Committee, and his 2014 Olympic results were annulled. In February 2018, the international Court of Arbitration for Sport reinstated Legkov's results in Sochi 2014, including two medals, and annulled disqualification imposed by IOC. CAS concluded that there were no sufficient evidence that Legkov had broken anti-doping rules.

On 19 January 2019 the IOC's appeal of Legkov's case was rejected by the Swiss Federal Tribunal, which according to the Legkov's lawyer means that he had been "finally cleared of the accusation of doping at 2014".

=== Political career ===
On 27 March 2016, Legkov joined the United Russia party and declared his desire to become a participant in the party's primaries for the Moscow Oblast Duma. In May 2016, he won the United Russia primaries. On 18 September 2016, he was elected as a deputy of the Moscow Oblast Duma in the Sergiyev Posad electoral district No. 21. He is a member of the Committee on Youth and Sports Affairs.

In November 2016, Legkov was elected head of the regional headquarters of the Young Army Cadets National Movement in the Moscow Oblast.

Since 2018, Legkov has been a deputy of the United Russia faction of the 6th Moscow Oblast Duma. He is Deputy Chairman of the Moscow Oblast Duma Committee on Youth and Sports Affairs.

Legkov is a member of PutinTeam, a political organization founded in support of Vladimir Putin.

== Cross-country skiing results ==
All results are sourced from the International Ski Federation (FIS).

=== Olympic Games ===
- 2 medals – (1 gold, 1 silver)

Year	Age	15 km individual	30 km skiathlon	50 km mass start	Sprint	4 × 10 km relay	Team sprint
2006	22	—	37	20	—	—	—
2010	26	15	4	14	—	8	—
2014	30	—	10	Gold	—	Silver	—

=== World Championships ===
- 2 medals – (1 silver, 1 bronze)

Year	Age	15 km individual	30 km skiathlon	50 km mass start	Sprint	4 × 10 km relay	Team sprint
2005	21	48	—	—	50	—	—
2007	23	5	6	—	—	Silver	—
2009	25	—	4	18	—	DSQ	—
2011	27	20	19	—	—	7	—
2013	29	25	6	4	—	Bronze	—
2015	31	14	—	—	—	4	—

=== World Cup ===
==== Season titles ====
- 1 title – (1 distance)

Season
Season	Discipline
2013	Distance

==== Season standings ====
Season	Age	Discipline standings			Ski Tour standings			
Season	Age	Overall	Distance	Sprint	Nordic Opening	Tour de Ski	World Cup Final	Ski Tour Canada
2003	19	NC	—N/a	—	—N/a	—N/a	—N/a	—N/a
2004	20	83	57	NC	—N/a	—N/a	—N/a	—N/a
2005	21	75	48	NC	—N/a	—N/a	—N/a	—N/a
2006	22	95	64	—	—N/a	—N/a	—N/a	—N/a
2007	23	2nd place, silver medalist(s)	6	NC	—N/a	2nd place, silver medalist(s)	—N/a	—N/a
2008	24	26	18	64	—N/a	20	33	—N/a
2009	25	11	8	52	—N/a	33	3rd place, bronze medalist(s)	—N/a
2010	26	30	14	99	—N/a	DNF	—	—N/a
2011	27	5	5	43	1st place, gold medalist(s)	DNF	13	—N/a
2012	28	5	3rd place, bronze medalist(s)	44	7	5	16	—N/a
2013	29	2nd place, silver medalist(s)	1st place, gold medalist(s)	72	7	1st place, gold medalist(s)	4	—N/a
2014	30	2nd place, silver medalist(s)	2nd place, silver medalist(s)	51	3rd place, bronze medalist(s)	5	3rd place, bronze medalist(s)	—N/a
2015	31	46	29	NC	34	—	—N/a	—N/a
2016	32	15	10	NC	8	12	—N/a	DNF
2017	33	49	39	—	—	—	—	—N/a

==== Individual podiums ====
- 9 victories – (6 WC, 3 SWC)
- 35 podiums – (22 WC, 13 SWC)

No.	Season	Date	Location	Race	Level	Place
1	2006–07	16 December 2006	La Clusaz, France	30 km Mass Start F	World Cup	2nd
2	2006–07	2 January 2007	Oberstdorf, Germany	10 km + 10 km Pursuit C/F	Stage World Cup	2nd
3	2006–07	7 January 2007	Val di Fiemme, Italy	11 km Pursuit F	Stage World Cup	2nd
4	2006–07	31 December 2006 – 7 January 2007	(Germany) (Italy) Tour de Ski	Overall Standings	World Cup	2nd
5	2006–07	20 January 2007	Rybinsk, Russia	30 km Mass Start F	World Cup	1st
6	2008–09	6 December 2008	La Clusaz, France	30 km Mass Start F	World Cup	3rd
7	2008–09	8 March 2009	Lahti, Finland	15 km Individual F	World Cup	1st
8	2008–09	18–22 March 2009	(Sweden) World Cup Final	Overall Standings	World Cup	3rd
9	2009–10	29 November 2009	Rukatunturi, Finland	15 km Individual C	World Cup	3rd
10	2009–10	20 December 2009	Rogla, Slovenia	30 km Mass Start C	World Cup	2nd
11	2010–11	29 November 2009	Rukatunturi, Finland	10 km Individual C	Stage World Cup	2nd
12	2010–11	26–28 November 2010	(Finland) Nordic Opening	Overall Standings	World Cup	1st
13	2010–11	11 December 2010	Davos, Switzerland	15 km Individual C	World Cup	2nd
14	2010–11	18 December 2010	La Clusaz, France	30 km Mass Start F	World Cup	3rd
15	2010–11	1 January 2011	Oberhof, Germany	15 km Pursuit C	Stage World Cup	3rd
16	2011–12	3 January 2012	Toblach, Italy	5 km Individual C	Stage World Cup	1st
17	2011–12	4 January 2012	Cortina-Toblach, Italy	35 km Pursuit F	Stage World Cup	3rd
18	2011–12	8 January 2012	Val di Fiemme, Italy	9 km Pursuit F	Stage World Cup	1st
19	2011–12	18 February 2012	Szklarska Poręba, Poland	15 km Individual C	World Cup	3rd
20	2012–13	1 December 2012	Rukatunturi, Finland	10 km Individual F	Stage World Cup	1st
21	2012–13	29 December 2012	Oberhof, Germany	4 km Individual F	Stage World Cup	3rd
22	2012–13	30 December 2012	Oberhof, Germany	15 km Pursuit C	Stage World Cup	2nd
23	2012–13	3 January 2013	Cortina-Toblach, Italy	35 km Pursuit F	Stage World Cup	2nd
24	2012–13	29 December 2012 – 6 January 2013	(Germany) (Switzerland) (Italy) Tour de Ski	Overall Standings	World Cup	1st
25	2012–13	2 February 2013	Sochi, Russia	15 km + 15 km Skiathlon C/F	World Cup	3rd
26	2012–13	17 February 2013	Davos, Switzerland	15 km Individual F	World Cup	3rd
27	2012–13	16 March 2013	Oslo, Norway	50 km Mass Start F	World Cup	1st
28	2012–13	24 March 2013	Falun, Sweden	15 km Pursuit F	Stage World Cup	3rd
29	2013–14	1 December 2013	(Finland) Nordic Opening	Overall Standings	World Cup	3rd
30	2013–14	1 February 2014	Toblach, Italy	15 km Individual C	World Cup	1st
31	2013–14	2 March 2014	Lahti, Finland	15 km Individual F	World Cup	3rd
32	2013–14	8 March 2014	Oslo, Norway	50 km Mass Start C	World Cup	3rd
33	2013–14	15 March 2014	Falun, Sweden	15 km + 15 km Skiathlon C/F	Stage World Cup	3rd
34	2013–14	14–16 March 2014	(Sweden) World Cup Final	Overall Standings	World Cup	3rd
35	2016–17	17 December 2016	La Clusaz, France	15 km Mass Start F	World Cup	3rd

==== Team podiums ====
- 3 victories – (3 RL)
- 12 podiums – (12 RL)

No.	Season	Date	Location	Race	Level	Place	Teammates
1	2006–07	19 November 2006	Gällivare, Sweden	4 × 10 km Relay C/F	World Cup	2nd	Rochev / Pankratov / Dementyev
2	2006–07	17 December 2006	La Clusaz, France	4 × 10 km Relay C/F	World Cup	1st	Rochev / Pankratov / Dementyev
3	2006–07	25 March 2007	Falun, Sweden	4 × 10 km Relay C/F	World Cup	3rd	Pankratov / Rochev / Vylegzhanin
4	2007–08	25 November 2007	Beitostølen, Norway	4 × 10 km Relay C/F	World Cup	3rd	Rochev / Pankratov / Dementyev
5	2009–10	22 November 2009	Beitostølen, Norway	4 × 10 km Relay C/F	World Cup	2nd	Vylegzhanin / Pankratov / Chernousov
6	2010–11	21 November 2010	Gällivare, Sweden	4 × 10 km Relay C/F	World Cup	2nd	Belov / Vylegzhanin / Sedov
7	2010–11	19 December 2010	La Clusaz, France	4 × 10 km Relay C/F	World Cup	2nd	Belov / Sedov / Vylegzhanin
8	2010–11	6 February 2011	Rybinsk, Russia	4 × 10 km Relay C/F	World Cup	1st	Belov / Vylegzhanin / Sedov
9	2012–13	25 November 2012	Gällivare, Sweden	4 × 7.5 km Relay C/F	World Cup	3rd	Belov / Vylegzhanin / Chernousov
10	2013–14	8 December 2013	Lillehammer, Norway	4 × 7.5 km Relay C/F	World Cup	1st	Yaparov / Bessmertnykh / Vylegzhanin
11	2015–16	24 January 2016	Nové Město, Czech Republic	4 × 7.5 km Relay C/F	World Cup	2nd	Belov / Chervotkin / Ustiugov
12	2016–17	18 December 2016	La Clusaz, France	4 × 7.5 km Relay C/F	World Cup	2nd	Belov / Chervotkin / Ustiugov
