= Janis Morweiser =

German Nordic combined skier

Janis Morweiser (born 1991) is a retired German Nordic combined skier.

He competed at the 2009, 2010 and 2011 Junior World Championships. His best event was 2010 by far, as he won individual silver and bronze medals and a team gold medal.

He made his Continental Cup debut in January 2009 in Eisenerz, and won his first race in March 2012 in Kuopio. He picked up two more race victories before his last Continental Cup outing in February 2014.

He made his World Cup debut in January 2010 in Chaux-Neuve. He collected his first World Cup points two years later in the same location, finishing 27th and 15th. In 2013 he started breaking the top 10, finishing 8th in Klingenthal and 4th in Almaty. His last World Cup outing was an 18th place in January 2014 in Chaykovsky.

He represented the sports club SC 1906 Oberstdorf.
