= 2010–11 FIS Cross-Country World Cup =

Cross-country skiing competition

Discipline	Men	Women
Overall	(Switzerland) Dario Cologna (2nd title)	(Poland) Justyna Kowalczyk (3rd title)
Distance	(Switzerland) Dario Cologna	(Poland) Justyna Kowalczyk
Sprint	(Sweden) Emil Jönsson	(Slovenia) Petra Majdič
Nations Cup	Norway	Norway
- Nations Cup Overall: Norway

Stage events
Nordic Opening	(Russia) Alexander Legkov	(Norway) Marit Bjørgen
Tour de Ski	(Switzerland) Dario Cologna	(Poland) Justyna Kowalczyk
World Cup Final	(Norway) Petter Northug	(Norway) Marit Bjørgen

Competition
Locations	17 venues	17 venues
Individual	29 events	29 events
Relay/Team	5 events	5 events

The 2010–11 FIS Cross-Country World Cup was a multi-race tournament over the season for cross-country skiers. It was the 30th official World Cup season in cross-country skiing for men and women. The season began on 20 November 2010 in Gällivare, Sweden and ended on 20 March 2011 in Falun, Sweden. The World Cup was organised by the FIS who also run world cups and championships in ski jumping, snowboarding and alpine skiing amongst others.

== Calendar ==
Both men's and women's events tend to be held at the same resorts over a 2 or 3 day period.

The Tour de Ski was a series of events which count towards the World Cup. This started with the meet at Oberhof and concluded at Val di Fiemme.

=== Men ===
WC	Stage	Date	Place	Discipline	Winner	Second	Third	Yellow bib	Ref.
1	1	20 November 2010	(Sweden) Gällivare	15 km F	(Sweden) Marcus Hellner	(Switzerland) Dario Cologna	(Sweden) Daniel Rickardsson	(Sweden) Marcus Hellner	
	2	26 November 2010	(Finland) Ruka	Sprint C	(Norway) John Kristian Dahl	(Kazakhstan) Alexey Poltaranin	(Finland) Sami Jauhojärvi	(Sweden) Marcus Hellner	
	3	27 November 2010	(Finland) Ruka	10 km C	(Switzerland) Dario Cologna	(Russia) Alexander Legkov	(Sweden) Daniel Rickardsson	(Switzerland) Dario Cologna	
	4	28 November 2010	(Finland) Ruka	15 km F Pursuit	(Czech Republic) Lukáš Bauer	(Russia) Ilia Chernousov	(Sweden) Marcus Hellner	(Sweden) Marcus Hellner	
2	1st Nordic Opening Overall (26–28 November 2010)				(Russia) Alexander Legkov	(Switzerland) Dario Cologna	(Sweden) Daniel Rickardsson	(Russia) Alexander Legkov	
3	5	4 December 2010	(Germany) Düsseldorf	Sprint F	(Sweden) Emil Jönsson	(Italy) Fulvio Scola	(Norway) Øystein Pettersen	(Russia) Alexander Legkov	
4	6	11 December 2010	(Switzerland) Davos	15 km C	(Kazakhstan) Alexey Poltaranin	(Russia) Alexander Legkov	(Czech Republic) Lukáš Bauer	(Russia) Alexander Legkov	
5	7	12 December 2010	(Switzerland) Davos	Sprint F	(Sweden) Emil Jönsson	(Russia) Alexey Petukhov	(Switzerland) Dario Cologna	(Switzerland) Dario Cologna	
6	8	18 December 2010	(France) La Clusaz	30 km F Mass Start	(Russia) Maxim Vylegzhanin	(Norway) Petter Northug	(Russia) Alexander Legkov	(Russia) Alexander Legkov	
	9	31 December 2010	(Germany) Oberhof	3.75 km F Prologue	(Sweden) Marcus Hellner	(Russia) Alexey Petukhov	(Norway) Petter Northug	(Russia) Alexander Legkov	
	10	1 January 2011	(Germany) Oberhof	15 km C Pursuit	(Switzerland) Dario Cologna	(Canada) Devon Kershaw	(Russia) Alexander Legkov	(Russia) Alexander Legkov	
	11	2 January 2011	(Germany) Oberstdorf	Sprint C	(Sweden) Emil Jönsson	(Canada) Devon Kershaw	(Switzerland) Dario Cologna	(Russia) Alexander Legkov	
	12	3 January 2011	(Germany) Oberstdorf	20 km Skiathlon	(Finland) Matti Heikkinen	(Switzerland) Dario Cologna	(Czech Republic) Martin Jakš	(Switzerland) Dario Cologna	
	13	5 January 2011	(Italy) Toblach	Sprint F	(Canada) Devon Kershaw	(Switzerland) Dario Cologna	(Norway) Petter Northug	(Switzerland) Dario Cologna	
	14	6 January 2011	(Italy) Cortina d'Ampezzo-Toblach	35 km F Pursuit	(Switzerland) Dario Cologna	(Sweden) Marcus Hellner	(Norway) Petter Northug	(Switzerland) Dario Cologna	
	15	8 January 2011	(Italy) Val di Fiemme	20 km C Mass Start	(Norway) Petter Northug	(Switzerland) Dario Cologna	(Canada) Devon Kershaw	(Switzerland) Dario Cologna	
	16	9 January 2011	(Italy) Val di Fiemme	9 km F Final Climb	(Czech Republic) Lukáš Bauer	(Italy) Roland Clara	(Switzerland) Curdin Perl	(Switzerland) Dario Cologna	
7	5th Tour de Ski Overall (31 December 2010 – 9 January 2011)				(Switzerland) Dario Cologna	(Norway) Petter Northug	(Czech Republic) Lukáš Bauer	(Switzerland) Dario Cologna	
8	17	15 January 2011	(Czech Republic) Liberec	Sprint F	(Norway) Ola Vigen Hattestad	(Italy) Federico Pellegrino	(Czech Republic) Dušan Kožíšek	(Switzerland) Dario Cologna	
9	18	22 January 2011	(Estonia) Otepää	15 km C	(Norway) Eldar Rønning	(Sweden) Daniel Rickardsson	(Russia) Maxim Vylegzhanin	(Switzerland) Dario Cologna	
10	19	23 January 2011	(Estonia) Otepää	Sprint C	(Norway) Eirik Brandsdal	(Norway) Ola Vigen Hattestad	(Russia) Nikita Kryukov	(Switzerland) Dario Cologna	
11	20	4 February 2011	(Russia) Rybinsk	20 km Skiathlon	(Russia) Ilia Chernousov	(France) Jean-Marc Gaillard	(France) Maurice Manificat	(Switzerland) Dario Cologna	
12	21	5 February 2011	(Russia) Rybinsk	Sprint F	(Russia) Alexey Petukhov	(Norway) Ola Vigen Hattestad	(Norway) Anders Gløersen	(Switzerland) Dario Cologna	
13	22	19 February 2011	(Norway) Konnerud	15 km C	(Sweden) Daniel Rickardsson	(Norway) Martin Johnsrud Sundby	(Norway) Petter Northug	(Switzerland) Dario Cologna	
14	23	20 February 2011	(Norway) Konnerud	Sprint F	(Sweden) Emil Jönsson	(Canada) Alex Harvey	(Norway) Petter Northug	(Switzerland) Dario Cologna	
FIS Nordic World Ski Championships 2011 (24 February–6 March)
15	24	12 March 2011	(Finland) Lahti	20 km Skiathlon	(Switzerland) Dario Cologna	(France) Maurice Manificat	(France) Vincent Vittoz	(Switzerland) Dario Cologna	
16	25	13 March 2011	(Finland) Lahti	Sprint C	(Sweden) Emil Jönsson	(Norway) Eirik Brandsdal	(Norway) Pål Golberg	(Switzerland) Dario Cologna	
	26	16 March 2011	(Sweden) Stockholm	Sprint C	(Sweden) Emil Jönsson	(Norway) Petter Northug	(Norway) Ola Vigen Hattestad	(Switzerland) Dario Cologna	
	27	18 March 2011	(Sweden) Falun	3.3 km C	(Russia) Ilia Chernousov	(Norway) Petter Northug	(Russia) Maxim Vylegzhanin	(Switzerland) Dario Cologna	
	28	19 March 2011	(Sweden) Falun	20 km Skiathlon	(Norway) Petter Northug	(Italy) Giorgio Di Centa	(Sweden) Daniel Rickardsson	(Switzerland) Dario Cologna	
	29	20 March 2011	(Sweden) Falun	15 km F Pursuit	(Norway) Finn Hågen Krogh	(France) Maurice Manificat	(Czech Republic) Lukáš Bauer	(Switzerland) Dario Cologna	
17	2010–11 World Cup Final (16–20 March 2011)				(Norway) Petter Northug	(Norway) Finn Hågen Krogh	(Switzerland) Dario Cologna	(Switzerland) Dario Cologna	

=== Women ===
WC	Stage	Date	Place	Discipline	Winner	Second	Third	Yellow bib	Ref.
1	1	20 November 2010	(Sweden) Gällivare	10 km F	(Norway) Marit Bjørgen	(Sweden) Charlotte Kalla	(Italy) Arianna Follis	(Norway) Marit Bjørgen	
	2	26 November 2010	(Finland) Ruka	Sprint C	(Norway) Marit Bjørgen	(Slovenia) Petra Majdič	(Norway) Astrid Uhrenholdt Jacobsen	(Norway) Marit Bjørgen	
	3	27 November 2010	(Finland) Ruka	5 km C	(Norway) Marit Bjørgen	(Poland) Justyna Kowalczyk	(Slovenia) Petra Majdič	(Norway) Marit Bjørgen	
	4	28 November 2010	(Finland) Ruka	10 km F Pursuit	(Norway) Therese Johaug	(Germany) Nicole Fessel	(Poland) Justyna Kowalczyk	(Norway) Marit Bjørgen	
2	1st Nordic Opening Overall (26–28 November 2010)				(Norway) Marit Bjørgen	(Poland) Justyna Kowalczyk	(Sweden) Charlotte Kalla	(Norway) Marit Bjørgen	
3	5	4 December 2010	(Germany) Düsseldorf	Sprint F	(Italy) Arianna Follis	(United States) Kikkan Randall	(Slovenia) Vesna Fabjan	(Norway) Marit Bjørgen	
4	6	11 December 2010	(Switzerland) Davos	10 km C	(Norway) Marit Bjørgen	(Poland) Justyna Kowalczyk	(Norway) Therese Johaug	(Norway) Marit Bjørgen	
5	7	12 December 2010	(Switzerland) Davos	Sprint F	(Norway) Marit Bjørgen	(Italy) Arianna Follis	(United States) Kikkan Randall	(Norway) Marit Bjørgen	
6	8	18 December 2010	(France) La Clusaz	15 km F Mass Start	(Norway) Marit Bjørgen	(Poland) Justyna Kowalczyk	(Norway) Kristin Størmer Steira	(Norway) Marit Bjørgen	
	9	31 December 2010	(Germany) Oberhof	2.5 km F Prologue	(Poland) Justyna Kowalczyk	(Sweden) Charlotte Kalla	(Norway) Astrid Uhrenholdt Jacobsen	(Norway) Marit Bjørgen	
	10	1 January 2011	(Germany) Oberhof	10 km C Pursuit	(Poland) Justyna Kowalczyk	(Finland) Krista Lähteenmäki	(Italy) Marianna Longa	(Norway) Marit Bjørgen	
	11	2 January 2011	(Germany) Oberstdorf	Sprint C	(Slovenia) Petra Majdič	(Poland) Justyna Kowalczyk	(Norway) Astrid Uhrenholdt Jacobsen	(Norway) Marit Bjørgen	
	12	3 January 2011	(Germany) Oberstdorf	10 km Skiathlon	(Sweden) Anna Haag	(Sweden) Charlotte Kalla	(Norway) Marthe Kristoffersen	(Norway) Marit Bjørgen	
	13	5 January 2011	(Italy) Toblach	Sprint F	(Slovenia) Petra Majdič	(Italy) Arianna Follis	(Italy) Magda Genuin	(Norway) Marit Bjørgen	
	14	6 January 2011	(Italy) Toblach	16 km F Pursuit	(Poland) Justyna Kowalczyk	(Italy) Arianna Follis	(Italy) Marianna Longa	(Poland) Justyna Kowalczyk	
	15	8 January 2011	(Italy) Val di Fiemme	10 km C Mass Start	(Poland) Justyna Kowalczyk	(Norway) Therese Johaug	(Italy) Marianna Longa	(Poland) Justyna Kowalczyk	
	16	9 January 2011	(Italy) Val di Fiemme	9 km F Final Climb	(Norway) Therese Johaug	(Norway) Marte Elden	(Norway) Marthe Kristoffersen	(Poland) Justyna Kowalczyk	
7	5th Tour de Ski Overall (31 December 2010 – 9 January 2011)				(Poland) Justyna Kowalczyk	(Norway) Therese Johaug	(Italy) Marianna Longa	(Poland) Justyna Kowalczyk	
8	17	15 January 2011	(Czech Republic) Liberec	Sprint F	(United States) Kikkan Randall	(Sweden) Hanna Falk	(Norway) Celine Brun-Lie	(Poland) Justyna Kowalczyk	
9	18	22 January 2011	(Estonia) Otepää	10 km C	(Norway) Marit Bjørgen	(Poland) Justyna Kowalczyk	(Norway) Therese Johaug	(Poland) Justyna Kowalczyk	
10	19	23 January 2011	(Estonia) Otepää	Sprint C	(Slovenia) Petra Majdič	(Sweden) Hanna Brodin	(Norway) Maiken Caspersen Falla	(Poland) Justyna Kowalczyk	
11	20	4 February 2011	(Russia) Rybinsk	10 km Skiathlon	(Poland) Justyna Kowalczyk	(Italy) Marianna Longa	(Finland) Aino-Kaisa Saarinen	(Poland) Justyna Kowalczyk	
12	21	5 February 2011	(Russia) Rybinsk	Sprint F	(Slovenia) Vesna Fabjan	(Slovenia) Katja Višnar	(Poland) Justyna Kowalczyk	(Poland) Justyna Kowalczyk	
13	22	19 February 2011	(Norway) Konnerud	10 km C	(Norway) Marit Bjørgen	(Poland) Justyna Kowalczyk	(Finland) Aino-Kaisa Saarinen	(Poland) Justyna Kowalczyk	
14	23	20 February 2011	(Norway) Konnerud	Sprint F	(United States) Kikkan Randall	(Norway) Maiken Caspersen Falla	(Sweden) Charlotte Kalla	(Poland) Justyna Kowalczyk	
FIS Nordic World Ski Championships 2011 (24 February–6 March)
15	24	12 March 2011	(Finland) Lahti	10 km Skiathlon	(Norway) Therese Johaug	(Poland) Justyna Kowalczyk	(Italy) Arianna Follis	(Poland) Justyna Kowalczyk	
16	25	13 March 2011	(Finland) Lahti	Sprint C	(Norway) Marit Bjørgen	(Norway) Astrid Uhrenholdt Jacobsen	(Slovenia) Petra Majdič	(Poland) Justyna Kowalczyk	
	26	16 March 2011	(Sweden) Stockholm	Sprint C	(Slovenia) Petra Majdič	(Norway) Marit Bjørgen	(Norway) Maiken Caspersen Falla	(Poland) Justyna Kowalczyk	
	27	18 March 2011	(Sweden) Falun	2.5 km C	(Norway) Marit Bjørgen	(Poland) Justyna Kowalczyk	(Norway) Therese Johaug	(Poland) Justyna Kowalczyk	
	28	19 March 2011	(Sweden) Falun	10 km Skiathlon	(Norway) Marit Bjørgen	(Poland) Justyna Kowalczyk	(Norway) Therese Johaug	(Poland) Justyna Kowalczyk	
	29	20 March 2011	(Sweden) Falun	10 km F Pursuit	(Italy) Arianna Follis	(Norway) Astrid Uhrenholdt Jacobsen	(Norway) Therese Johaug	(Poland) Justyna Kowalczyk	
17	2010–11 World Cup Final (16–20 March 2011)				(Norway) Marit Bjørgen	(Poland) Justyna Kowalczyk	(Norway) Therese Johaug	(Poland) Justyna Kowalczyk	

=== Men's team ===
WC	Date	Place	Discipline	Winner	Second	Third	Ref.
1	21 November 2010	(Sweden) Gällivare	4 × 10 km relay C/F	Sweden I Mats Larsson; Johan Olsson; Daniel Rickardsson; Marcus Hellner	Russia I Evgeniy Belov; Maxim Vylegzhanin; Petr Sedov; Alexander Legkov	Norway I Eldar Rønning; Martin Johnsrud Sundby; Chris Jespersen; Sjur Røthe	
2	5 December 2010	(Germany) Düsseldorf	Team Sprint F	Norway II Ola Vigen Hattestad; Anders Gløersen	Sweden I Mats Larsson; Emil Jönsson	Italy II Fabio Pasini; David Hofer	
3	19 December 2010	(France) La Clusaz	4 × 10 km relay C/F	Switzerland Toni Livers; Dario Cologna; Remo Fischer; Curdin Perl	Russia I Evgeniy Belov; Alexander Legkov; Petr Sedov; Maxim Vylegzhanin	Norway I Eldar Rønning; Martin Johnsrud Sundby; Tord Asle Gjerdalen; Petter Northug	
4	16 January 2011	(Czech Republic) Liberec	Team Sprint C	Norway I Johan Kjølstad; Ola Vigen Hattestad	Sweden I Jesper Modin; Mats Larsson	Norway II Eirik Brandsdal; John Kristian Dahl	
5	6 February 2011	(Russia) Rybinsk	4 × 10 km relay C/F	Russia I Evgeniy Belov; Maxim Vylegzhanin; Petr Sedov; Alexander Legkov	Italy I Valerio Checchi; Giorgio Di Centa; Roland Clara; Pietro Piller Cottrer	Germany Andy Kühne; Franz Göring; Tom Reichelt; Tobias Angerer	

=== Women's team ===
WC	Date	Place	Discipline	Winner	Second	Third	Ref.
1	21 November 2010	(Sweden) Gällivare	4 × 5 km relay C/F	Norway I Vibeke Skofterud; Therese Johaug; Kristin Størmer Steira; Marit Bjørgen	Sweden I Britta Johansson Norgren; Anna Haag; Maria Rydqvist; Charlotte Kalla	Italy I Magda Genuin; Marianna Longa; Silvia Rupil; Arianna Follis	
2	5 December 2010	(Germany) Düsseldorf	Team Sprint F	Italy I Magda Genuin; Arianna Follis	Norway I Maiken Caspersen Falla; Celine Brun-Lie	Canada Daria Gaiazova; Chandra Crawford	
3	19 December 2010	(France) La Clusaz	4 × 5 km relay C/F	Norway I Vibeke Skofterud; Therese Johaug; Kristin Størmer Steira; Marit Bjørgen	Italy I Virginia De Martin Topranin; Marianna Longa; Silvia Rupil; Arianna Follis	Sweden I Sara Lindborg; Anna Haag; Maria Rydqvist; Charlotte Kalla	
4	16 January 2011	(Czech Republic) Liberec	Team Sprint C	Norway I Maiken Caspersen Falla; Marit Bjørgen	Italy I Magda Genuin; Marianna Longa	Norway II Kari Vikhagen Gjeitnes; Celine Brun-Lie	
5	6 February 2011	(Russia) Rybinsk	4 × 5 km relay C/F	Italy Magda Genuin; Marianna Longa; Silvia Rupil; Arianna Follis	Russia I Valentina Novikova; Svetlana Nikolaeva; Yuliya Chekalyova; Olga Mikhailova	Russia II Anastasia Kasakul; Yuliya Tikhonova; Yuliya Ivanova; Natalya Korostelyova	

== Men's standings ==
=== Overall ===
Rank	Athlete	Points
1	Dario Cologna (SUI)	1566
2	Petter Northug (NOR)	1236
3	Daniel Rickardsson (SWE)	981
4	Lukáš Bauer (CZE)	923
5	Alexander Legkov (RUS)	796
6	Emil Jönsson (SWE)	746
7	Marcus Hellner (SWE)	695
8	Devon Kershaw (CAN)	602
9	Jean-Marc Gaillard (FRA)	589
10	Alex Harvey (CAN)	552

Rank	Athlete	Points
11	Maxim Vylegzhanin (RUS)	512
12	Ilia Chernousov (RUS)	503
13	Maurice Manificat (FRA)	488
14	Curdin Perl (SUI)	447
15	Roland Clara (ITA)	446
16	Martin Jakš (CZE)	438
17	Giorgio Di Centa (ITA)	425
18	Ola Vigen Hattestad (NOR)	407
19	Eldar Rønning (NOR)	388
20	Petr Sedov (RUS)	387

Rank	Athlete	Points
21	Alexey Petukhov (RUS)	323
22	Jesper Modin (SWE)	322
23	Vincent Vittoz (FRA)	304
24	Fulvio Scola (ITA)	283
25	Matti Heikkinen (FIN)	280
26	Jens Filbrich (GER)	263
27	Kris Freeman (USA)	255
28	Martin Johnsrud Sundby (NOR)	252
29	Eirik Brandsdal (NOR)	246
30	Sami Jauhojärvi (FIN)	244

=== Distance ===
Rank	Athlete	Points
1	Dario Cologna (SUI)	706
2	Daniel Rickardsson (SWE)	568
3	Lukáš Bauer (CZE)	553
4	Petter Northug (NOR)	512
5	Alexander Legkov (RUS)	503
6	Maxim Vylegzhanin (RUS)	386
7	Marcus Hellner (SWE)	365
8	Jean-Marc Gaillard (FRA)	364
9	Ilia Chernousov (RUS)	342
10	Maurice Manificat (FRA)	308

=== Sprint ===
Rank	Athlete	Points
1	Emil Jönsson (SWE)	580
2	Ola Vigen Hattestad (NOR)	407
3	Jesper Modin (SWE)	300
4	Alexey Petukhov (RUS)	277
5	Fulvio Scola (ITA)	275
6	Eirik Brandsdal (NOR)	239
7	Petter Northug (NOR)	204
8	Andrew Newell (USA)	198
9	Renato Pasini (ITA)	190
10	Alex Harvey (CAN)	182

== Women's standings ==
=== Overall ===
Rank	Athlete	Points
1	Justyna Kowalczyk (POL)	2073
2	Marit Bjørgen (NOR)	1578
3	Arianna Follis (ITA)	1310
4	Therese Johaug (NOR)	1173
5	Charlotte Kalla (SWE)	1100
6	Petra Majdič (SLO)	1087
7	Marianna Longa (ITA)	1051
8	Astrid Jacobsen (NOR)	810
9	Aino-Kaisa Saarinen (FIN)	715
10	Kikkan Randall (USA)	657

Rank	Athlete	Points
11	Anna Haag (SWE)	604
12	Krista Lähteenmäki (FIN)	568
13	Marthe Kristoffersen (NOR)	560
14	Riitta-Liisa Roponen (FIN)	518
15	Katrin Zeller (GER)	518
16	Yuliya Chekalyova (RUS)	442
17	Nicole Fessel (GER)	420
18	Ida Ingemarsdotter (SWE)	360
19	Valentyna Shevchenko (UKR)	350
20	Marte Elden (NOR)	341

Rank	Athlete	Points
21	Vibeke Skofterud (NOR)	331
22	Alena Procházková (SVK)	315
23	Laure Barthélémy (FRA)	312
24	Maiken Caspersen Falla (NOR)	305
25	Ingvild Flugstad Østberg (NOR)	304
26	Riikka Sarasoja (FIN)	301
27	Magda Genuin (ITA)	288
28	Kristin Størmer Steira (NOR)	268
29	Vesna Fabjan (SLO)	266
30	Katja Višnar (SLO)	266

=== Distance ===
Rank	Athlete	Points
1	Justyna Kowalczyk (POL)	1039
2	Marit Bjørgen (NOR)	775
3	Therese Johaug (NOR)	671
4	Marianna Longa (ITA)	563
5	Arianna Follis (ITA)	518
6	Charlotte Kalla (SWE)	503
7	Aino-Kaisa Saarinen (FIN)	446
8	Anna Haag (SWE)	430
9	Riitta-Liisa Roponen (FIN)	353
10	Marthe Kristoffersen (NOR)	350

=== Sprint ===
Rank	Athlete	Points
1	Petra Majdič (SLO)	480
2	Arianna Follis (ITA)	434
3	Kikkan Randall (USA)	427
4	Marit Bjørgen (NOR)	403
5	Justyna Kowalczyk (POL)	314
6	Maiken Caspersen Falla (NOR)	305
7	Astrid Jacobsen (NOR)	277
8	Katja Višnar (SLO)	266
9	Vesna Fabjan (SLO)	264
10	Hanna Falk (SWE)	232

== Nations Cup ==
=== Overall ===
Rank	Nation	Points
1	Norway	11507
2	Sweden	7745
3	Russia	6244
4	Italy	6131
5	Finland	4265
6	Germany	3022
7	Switzerland	2821
8	France	2733
9	Poland	2349
10	Slovenia	1895

=== Men ===
Rank	Nation	Points
1	Norway	4807
2	Russia	4467
3	Sweden	4107
4	Switzerland	2680
5	Italy	2571
6	France	1869
7	Czech Republic	1695
8	Canada	1525
9	Germany	1468
10	Finland	1279

=== Women ===
Rank	Nation	Points
1	Norway	6700
2	Sweden	3638
3	Italy	3560
4	Finland	2986
5	Poland	2248
6	Slovenia	1895
7	Russia	1777
8	Germany	1554
9	France	864
10	United States	739

== Points distribution ==
The table shows the number of points won in the 2010–11 Cross-Country Skiing World Cup for men and women.

Place	1	2	3	4	5	6	7	8	9	10	11	12	13	14	15	16	17	18	19	20	21	22	23	24	25	26	27	28	29	30
Individual	100	80	60	50	45	40	36	32	29	26	24	22	20	18	16	15	14	13	12	11	10	9	8	7	6	5	4	3	2	1
Team Sprint	100	80	60	50	45	40	36	32	29	26	24	22	20	18	16	15	14	13	12	11	10	9	8	7	6	5	4	3	2	1
Nordic Opening	200	160	120	100	90	80	72	64	58	52	48	44	40	36	32	30	28	26	24	22	20	18	16	14	12	10	8	6	4	2
World Cup Final	200	160	120	100	90	80	72	64	58	52	48	44	40	36	32	30	28	26	24	22	20	18	16	14	12	10	8	6	4	2
Relay	200	160	120	100	90	80	72	64	58	52	48	44	40	36	32	30	28	26	24	22	20	18	16	14	12	10	8	6	4	2
Tour de Ski	400	320	240	200	180	160	144	128	116	104	96	88	80	72	64	60	56	52	48	44	40	36	32	28	24	20	16	12	8	4
Stage Nordic Opening	50	46	43	40	37	34	32	30	28	26	24	22	20	18	16	15	14	13	12	11	10	9	8	7	6	5	4	3	2	1
Stage Tour de Ski	50	46	43	40	37	34	32	30	28	26	24	22	20	18	16	15	14	13	12	11	10	9	8	7	6	5	4	3	2	1
Stage World Cup Final	50	46	43	40	37	34	32	30	28	26	24	22	20	18	16	15	14	13	12	11	10	9	8	7	6	5	4	3	2	1

A skier's best results in all distance races and sprint races counts towards the overall World Cup totals.

All distance races, included individual stages in Tour de Ski and in World Cup Final (which counts as 50% of a normal race), count towards the distance standings. All sprint races, including the sprint races during the Tour de Ski and the first race of the World Cup final (which counts as 50% of a normal race), count towards the sprint standings.

The Nations Cup ranking is calculated by adding each country's individual competitors' scores and scores from team events. Relay events count double (see World Cup final positions), with only one team counting towards the total, while in team sprint events two teams contribute towards the total, with the usual World Cup points (100 to winning team, etc.) awarded.

== Achievements ==
First World Cup career victory

Men

- Alexey Poltoranin (KAZ), 23, in his 7th season – the WC 6 (15 km C) in Davos; first podium was 2010–11 WC 2 (Sprint C) in Ruka
- Maxim Vylegzhanin (RUS), 28, in his 7th season – the WC 8 (30 km F Mass Start) in La Clusaz; first podium was 2009–10 WC 3 (15 km C) in Ruka
- Devon Kershaw (CAN), 28, in his 8th season – the WC 13 (Sprint F) in Toblach; first podium was 2006–07 WC 25 (Sprint F) in Borlänge
- Eirik Brandsdal (NOR), 24, in his 5th season – the WC 19 (Sprint C) in Otepää; first podium was 2009–10 WC 3 (Sprint F) in Düsseldorf
- Ilia Chernousov (RUS), 24, in his 5th season – the WC 20 (20 km Pursuit) in Rybinsk; first podium was 2009–10 WC 11 (30 km Pursuit) in Rybinsk
- Finn Hågen Krogh (NOR), 20, in his 1st season – the WC 29 (15 km F Handicap Start) in Falun; also first podium

Women

- Anna Haag (SWE), 24, in her 5th season – the WC 12 (10 km Pursuit) in Oberstdorf; first podium was 2009–10 WC 1 (10 km F) in Beitostølen

First World Cup podium

Men

- Alexey Poltoranin (KAZ), 23, in his 7th season – no. 2 in the WC 2 (Sprint C) in Ruka

Women

- Krista Lähteenmäki (FIN), 20, in her 3rd season – no. 2 in the WC 10 (10 km C Handicap Start) in Oberhof
- Marte Elden (NOR), 24, in her 6th season – no. 2 in the WC 16 (9 km F Final Climb) in Val di Fiemme
- Hanna Brodin (SWE), 20, in her 3rd season – no. 2 in the WC 19 (Sprint C) in Otepää

Victories in this World Cup (all-time number of victories as of 2010/11 season in parentheses)

Men

- Emil Jönsson (SWE), 6 (12) first places
- Dario Cologna (SUI), 5 (10) first places
- Petter Northug (NOR), 3 (18) first places
- Lukáš Bauer (CZE), 2 (17) first places
- Marcus Hellner (SWE), 2 (3) first places
- Ilia Chernousov (RUS), 2 (2) first places
- Ola Vigen Hattestad (NOR), 1 (10) first place
- Matti Heikkinen (FIN), 1 (4) first place
- Alexander Legkov (RUS), 1 (3) first place
- Eldar Rønning (NOR), 1 (8) first place
- John Kristian Dahl (NOR), 1 (2) first place
- Alexey Petukhov (RUS), 1 (2) first place
- Daniel Rickardsson (SWE), 1 (2) first place
- Alexey Poltoranin (KAZ), 1 (1) first place
- Maxim Vylegzhanin (RUS), 1 (1) first place
- Devon Kershaw (CAN), 1 (1) first place
- Eirik Brandsdal (NOR), 1 (1) first place
- Finn Hågen Krogh (NOR), 1 (1) first place

Women

- Marit Bjørgen (NOR), 13 (52) first places
- Justyna Kowalczyk (POL), 6 (22) first places
- Petra Majdič (SLO), 4 (24) first places
- Therese Johaug (NOR), 3 (4) first places
- Kikkan Randall (USA), 2 (3) first places
- Arianna Follis (ITA), 2 (8) first places
- Vesna Fabjan (SLO), 1 (2) first place
- Anna Haag (SWE), 1 (1) first place
