= Pyotr Sedov =

Russian cross-country skier

Petr Sedov
Personal information
- Full name: Petr Nikolayevich Sedov
- Nationality: Russia
- Born: 24 August 1990 (age 35) Sarov, Soviet Union

Sport
- Sport: Skiing

World Cup career
- Seasons: 7 – (2009–2012, 2014–2015, 2017)
- Indiv. starts: 47
- Indiv. podiums: 2
- Indiv. wins: 2
- Team starts: 7
- Team podiums: 3
- Team wins: 1
- Overall titles: 0 – (20th in 2011)
- Discipline titles: 0
Medal record
Men's cross-country skiing
Representing Russia
Junior World Championships
Gold medal – first place	2008 Mals	4 × 5 km relay
Gold medal – first place	2009 Praz de Lys-Sommand	20 km skiathlon
Gold medal – first place	2009 Praz de Lys-Sommand	10 km freestyle
Gold medal – first place	2009 Praz de Lys-Sommand	4 × 5 km relay
Gold medal – first place	2010 Hinterzarten	20 km skiathlon
Silver medal – second place	2008 Mals	20 km freestyle
Silver medal – second place	2010 Hinterzarten	4 × 5 km relay
Bronze medal – third place	2010 Hinterzarten	10 km classical
- Updated on 29 April 2019

Petr Nikolayevich Sedov (Russian: Пётр Николаевич Седов; born 24 August 1990 in Sarov, Russian SFSR) is a Russian cross-country skier who participated in his first World Cup in March 2009 in Lahti. Only 18 years old he came in as number ten in 15 kilometre freestyle, in front of prominent names like Dario Cologna, and Tobias Angerer. Previously he has three victories in the FIS Junior Ski World Championships (2008 and 2009).

Sedov finished eighth in the 4 × 10 km relay at the 2010 Winter Olympics in Vancouver.

== Cross-country skiing results ==
All results are sourced from the International Ski Federation (FIS).

=== Olympic Games ===
Year	Age	15 km individual	30 km skiathlon	50 km mass start	Sprint	4 × 10 km relay	Team sprint
2010	19	26	—	24	—	8	—

=== World Championships ===
Year	Age	15 km individual	30 km skiathlon	50 km mass start	Sprint	4 × 10 km relay	Team sprint
2011	20	—	—	31	—	—	—
2017	26	—	21	—	—	—	—

=== World Cup ===
==== Season standings ====
Season	Age	Discipline standings			Ski Tour standings		
Season	Age	Overall	Distance	Sprint	Nordic Opening	Tour de Ski	World Cup Final
2009	18	112	66	—	—N/a	—	—
2010	19	118	72	—	—N/a	—	—
2011	20	20	13	NC	8	—	12
2012	21	24	20	NC	10	—	5
2014	23	102	61	NC	—	36	—
2015	24	122	72	—	—	—	—N/a
2017	26	29	19	NC	—	29	—

==== Individual podiums ====
- 2 victories – (1 WC, 1 SWC)
- 2 podiums – (1 WC, 1 SWC)

No.	Season	Date	Location	Race	Level	Place
1	2011–12	18 March 2012	Falun, Sweden	15 km Pursuit F	Stage World Cup	1st
2	2016–17	4 February 2017	Pyeongchang, South Korea	15 km + 15 km Skiathlon C/F	World Cup	1st

==== Team podiums ====
- 1 victory – (1 RL)
- 3 podiums – (3 RL)

No.	Season	Date	Location	Race	Level	Place	Teammates
1	2010–11	21 November 2010	Gällivare, Sweden	4 × 10 km Relay C/F	World Cup	2nd	Belov / Vylegzhanin / Legkov
2	2010–11	19 December 2010	La Clusaz, France	4 × 10 km Relay C/F	World Cup	2nd	Belov / Legkov / Vylegzhanin
3	2010–11	6 February 2011	Rybinsk, Russia	4 × 10 km Relay C/F	World Cup	1st	Belov / Vylegzhanin / Legkov
