= 2010 Nordic Junior World Ski Championships =

International skiing competition

FIS Nordic Junior and U23 World Ski Championships 2010
- Host city: Hinterzarten, Germany
- Events: 20
- Opening: 24 January
- Closing: 1 February

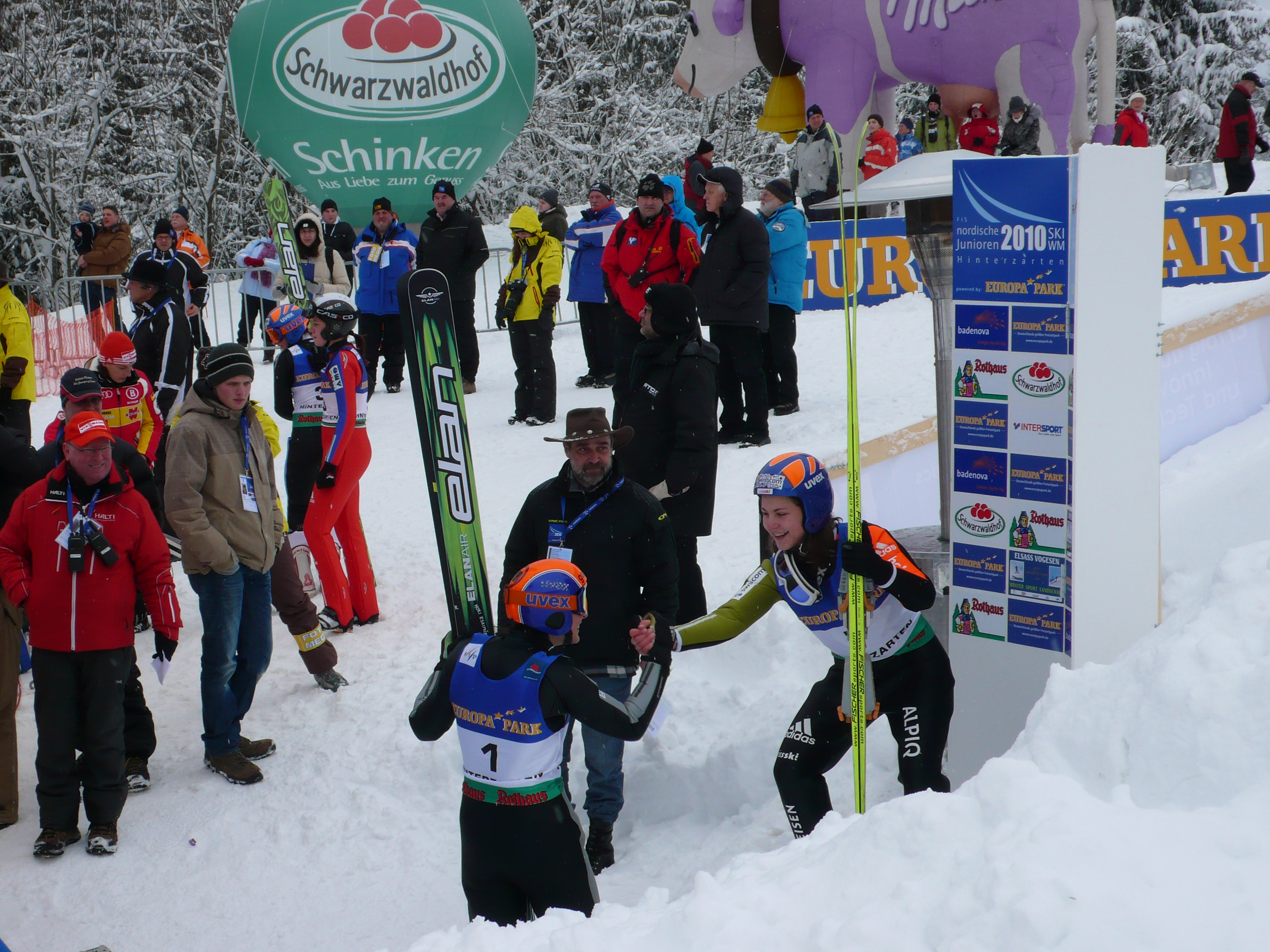
World Junior Ski Championship 2010 Hinterzarten Tepes Fuchs 066

The FIS Nordic Junior and U23 World Ski Championships 2010 took place in Hinterzarten, Germany from 24 January to 1 February 2010. It was the 33rd Junior World Championships and the 5th Under-23 World Championships in Nordic skiing.

== Medal summary ==
=== Junior events ===
==== Cross-country skiing ====
Event	Gold		Silver		Bronze	
Men's Junior Events
Men's junior sprint free	Tomas Northug; Norway		Pål Golberg; Norway		Federico Pellegrino; Italy	
Men's junior 10 kilometre classic	Pål Golberg; Norway	23:58.0	Evgeniy Belov; Russia	24:07.6	Petr Sedov; Russia	24:31.8
Men's junior 20 kilometre skiathlon	Petr Sedov; Russia	56:54.1	Petrică Hogiu; Romania	57:35.4	Finn Hågen Krogh; Norway	57:38.4
Men's junior 4 × 5 km relay	Norway; Didrik Tønseth; Pål Golberg; Tomas Northug; Finn Hågen Krogh	54:15.1	Russia; Gleb Retivykh; Evgeniy Belov; Alexey Vitsenko; Petr Sedov	54:18.9	Germany; Thomas Wick; Lucas Bögl; Hannes Dotzler; Thomas Bing	54:43.1
Ladies' Junior Events
Ladies' junior sprint free	Hanna Brodin; Sweden		Ingvild Flugstad Østberg; Norway		Kari Øyre Slind; Norway	
Ladies' junior 5 kilometre classic	Krista Lähteenmäki; Finland	13:33.9	Ingvild Flugstad Østberg; Norway	13:36.9	Hanna Brodin; Sweden	13:37.9
Ladies' junior 10 kilometre skiathlon	Ingvild Flugstad Østberg; Norway	30:51.0	Heidi Weng; Norway	31:37.6	Tuva Toftdahl; Norway	31:49.1
Ladies' junior 4 × 3.33 km relay	Norway; Kari Øyre Slind; Heidi Weng; Tuva Toftdahl; Ingvild Flugstad Østberg	42:19.2	Finland; Maria Grundvall; Marjaana Pitkänen; Tanja Kauppinen; Krista Lähteenmäki	42:19.7	Sweden; Maria Nordström; Lisa Larsen; Madeleine Thorn; Hanna Brodin	42:24.9

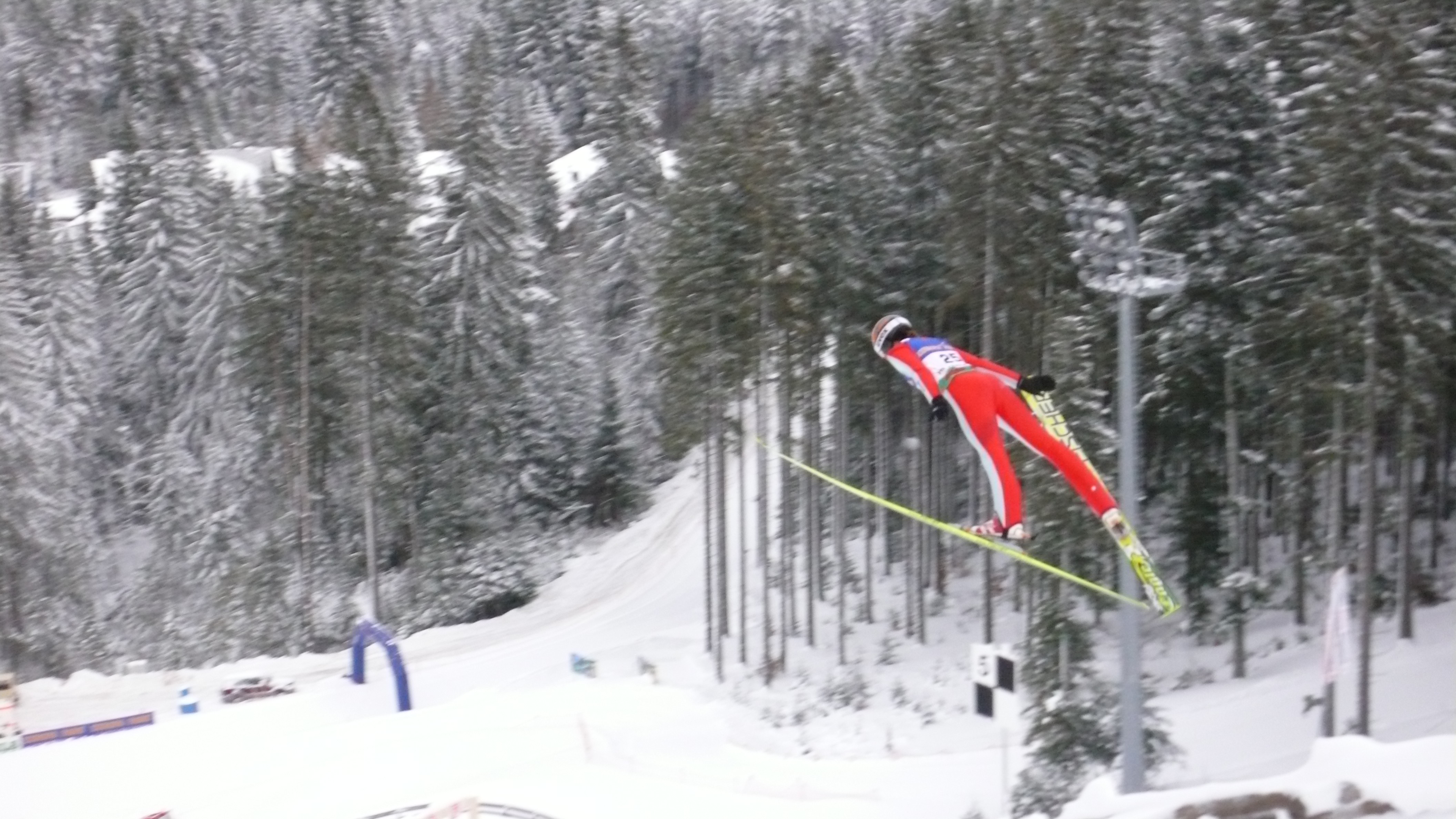
World Junior Ski Championship 2010 Hinterzarten Caroline Espiau 0019

==== Nordic Combined ====
Event	Gold		Silver		Bronze	
Normal hill/5 km	Junshiro Kobayashi; Japan	12:55.4	Marjan Jelenko; Slovenia	13:04.3	Janis Morweiser; Germany	13:11.0
Normal hill/10 km	Ole Christian Wendel; Norway	29:43.5	Janis Morweiser; Germany	30:04.4	Gudmund Storlien; Norway	30:09.5
Team normal hill/4 × 5 km	Germany; Johannes Firn; Janis Morweiser; Johannes Rydzek; Fabian Riessle	53:00.1	Norway; Truls Sønstehagen Johansen; Jørgen Graabak; Gudmund Storlien; Ole Christian Wendel	53:13.6	Slovenia; Marjan Jelenko; Jože Kamenik; Matic Plaznik; Gašper Berlot	55:19.8

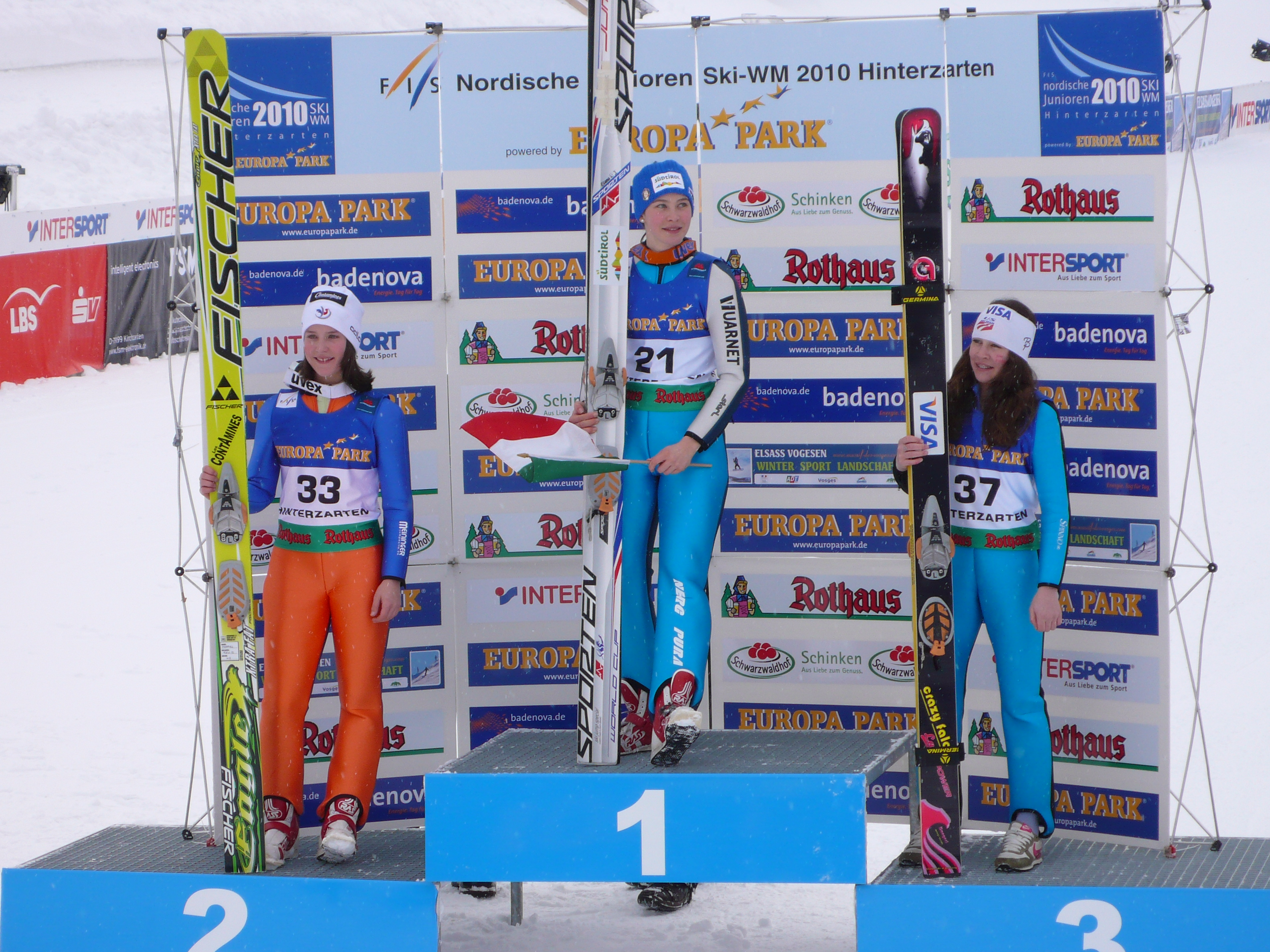

==== Ski jumping ====
Event	Gold		Silver		Bronze	
Men's Junior Events
Men's junior individual normal hill	Michael Hayböck; Austria	282.5	Peter Prevc; Slovenia	278.5	Diego Dellasega; Italy	266.0
Men's junior team normal hill	Austria; Mario Innauer; Lukas Müller; Florian Schabereiter; Michael Hayböck	1030.5	Germany; Felix Schoft; Stephan Leyhe; Tobias Bogner; Pascal Bodmer	1010.5	Slovenia; Matic Kramaršič; Dejan Judež; Jaka Hvala; Peter Prevc	1006.5
Ladies' Junior Events
Ladies' junior individual normal hill	Elena Runggaldier; Italy	267.5	Coline Mattel; France	258.0	Sarah Hendrickson; United States	249.5

=== Under-23 events ===
==== Cross-country skiing ====
Event	Gold		Silver		Bronze	
Men's Under-23 Events
Men's under-23 sprint free	Ole-Marius Bach; Norway		Martin Jäger; Switzerland		Andrey Parfenov; Russia	
Men's under-23 15 kilometre classic	Vladislav Skobelev; Russia	37:50.0	Stanislav Perliak; Russia	38:10.7	Gennadiy Matviyenko; Kazakhstan	38:11.3
Men's under-23 30 kilometre skiathlon	Paul Constantin Pepene; Romania	1:24:45.6	Ole-Marius Bach; Norway	1:25:11.0	Andreas Katz; Germany	1:25:11.5
Ladies' Under-23 Events
Ladies' under-23 sprint free	Mari Laukkanen; Finland		Denise Herrmann; Germany		Kathrine Rolsted Harsem; Norway	
Ladies' under-23 10 kilometre classic	Kerttu Niskanen; Finland	29:36.3	Alevtina Tanygina; Russia	29:43.2	Svetlana Nikolaeva; Russia	29:51.1
Ladies' under-23 15 kilometre skiathlon	Astrid Øyre Slind; Norway	44:47.4	Hilde Lauvhaug; Norway	44:55.5	Svetlana Nikolaeva; Russia	45:04.4

=== Medal table ===
* Host nation (Germany)

Rank	Nation	Gold	Silver	Bronze	Total
1	Norway (NOR)	8	7	5	20
2	Finland (FIN)	3	1	0	4
3	Russia (RUS)	2	4	4	10
4	Austria (AUT)	2	0	0	2
5	Germany (GER)*	1	3	3	7
6	Romania (ROU)	1	1	0	2
7	Italy (ITA)	1	0	2	3
7	Sweden (SWE)	1	0	2	3
9	Japan (JPN)	1	0	0	1
10	Slovenia (SLO)	0	2	2	4
11	France (FRA)	0	1	0	1
11	Switzerland (SUI)	0	1	0	1
13	Kazakhstan (KAZ)	0	0	1	1
13	United States (USA)	0	0	1	1
Totals (14 entries)		20	20	20	60
