= Maxim Vylegzhanin =

Russian cross-country skier

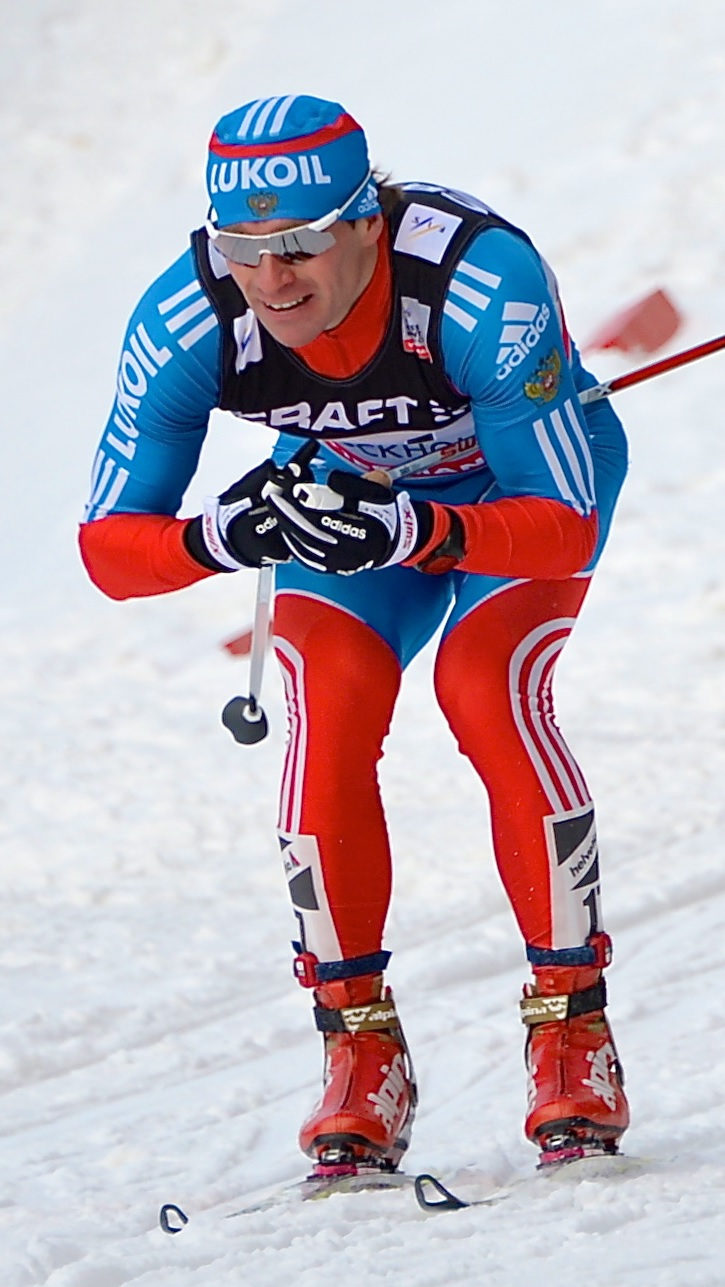
- Maxim Vylegzhanin at the FIS World Cup Royal Palace Sprint, Stockholm

Personal information
- Full name: Maxim Mikhailovich Vylegzhanin
- Nationality: Russia
- Born: 18 October 1982 (age 43) Sharkan, Udmurt ASSR, Soviet Union
- Height: 1.74 m (5 ft 9 in)

Sport
- Sport: Skiing
- Club: Dynamo Sports Club

World Cup career
- Seasons: 15 – (2005–2019)
- Indiv. starts: 208
- Indiv. podiums: 24
- Indiv. wins: 7
- Team starts: 23
- Team podiums: 10
- Team wins: 4
- Overall titles: 0 – (5th in 2013)
- Discipline titles: 0
Medal record
Men's cross-country skiing
Representing Russia
Event	1st	2nd	3rd
Olympic Games	0	3	0
World Championships	1	3	1
Total	1	6	1
Olympic Games
Silver medal – second place	2014 Sochi	50 km freestyle
Silver medal – second place	2014 Sochi	4 × 10 km relay
Silver medal – second place	2014 Sochi	Team sprint
World Championships
Gold medal – first place	2015 Falun	30 km skiathlon
Silver medal – second place	2009 Liberec	50 km freestyle
Silver medal – second place	2011 Holmenkollen	30 km skiathlon
Silver medal – second place	2011 Holmenkollen	50 km freestyle
Bronze medal – third place	2013 Val di Fiemme	4 × 10 km relay
- Updated on 2 April 2019

Maxim Mikhailovich Vylegzhanin (Russian: Максим Михайлович Вылегжанин; born 18 October 1982) is a Russian former cross country skier and a three-time Olympic silver medalist at the 2014 Sochi Olympics in 50 km freestyle, 4 × 10 km relay and team sprint. He was stripped of his 2014 Olympic medals by the International Olympic Committee (IOC) on 9 November 2017, however on 1 February 2018, his results were restored as a result of the successful appeal.

Vylegzhanin has competed since 2002. His first World Cup start was on 22 January 2005 in Pragelato, Italy. He won a silver medal in the 50 km event (time: 1:59:38:8 – average speed 25,1 km/h) at the FIS Nordic World Ski Championships 2009 in Liberec.

== Career ==
Vylegzhanin's best individual World Cup finish was first place in the 30 km in La Clusaz in December 2010. He has a total of four victories ranging from pursuit to 50 km between 2007 and 2008, all in lesser events. He also finished eighth in the 4 x 10 km relay at the 2010 Winter Olympics in Vancouver, British Columbia, Canada.

== Doping case ==
In December 2016, the International Ski Federation provisionally suspended six Russian cross-country skiers due to doping violations during the 2014 Winter Olympics, including Vylegzhanin. In December 2017, Vylegzhanin was disqualified for doping offences by the International Olympic Committee, and his 2014 Olympic results were annulled. In February 2018, the international Court of Arbitration for Sport reinstated Vylegzhanin results in Sochi 2014, including three medals, and annulled disqualification imposed by IOC. On 19 January 2019 the IOC's appeal of Vylegzhanin case was dismissed by the Swiss Federal Tribunal.

== Cross-country skiing results ==
All results are sourced from the International Ski Federation (FIS).

=== Olympic Games ===
- 3 medals – (3 silver)

Year	Age	15 km individual	30 km skiathlon	50 km mass start	Sprint	4 × 10 km relay	Team sprint
2010	27	9	17	8	—	8	—
2014	31	—	4	Silver	—	Silver	Silver

=== World Championships ===
- 5 medals – (1 gold, 3 silver, 1 bronze)

Year	Age	15 km individual	30 km skiathlon	50 km mass start	Sprint	4 × 10 km relay	Team sprint
2009	26	45	24	Silver	—	—	—
2011	28	10	Silver	Silver	—	7	—
2013	30	57	5	8	—	Bronze	—
2015	32	—	Gold	4	—	4	—
2019	36	33	—	—	—	—	—

=== World Cup ===
==== Season standings ====
Season	Age	Discipline standings			Ski Tour standings			
Season	Age	Overall	Distance	Sprint	Nordic Opening	Tour de Ski	World Cup Final	Ski Tour Canada
2005	22	67	42	—	—N/a	—N/a	—N/a	—N/a
2006	23	152	110	NC	—N/a	—N/a	—N/a	—N/a
2007	24	79	52	NC	—N/a	—	—N/a	—N/a
2008	25	51	51	51	—N/a	21	—	—N/a
2009	26	23	16	96	—N/a	15	27	—N/a
2010	27	8	7	25	—N/a	DNF	4	—N/a
2011	28	11	6	NC	5	—	14	—N/a
2012	29	7	4	39	18	8	12	—N/a
2013	30	5	7	39	2nd place, silver medalist(s)	3rd place, bronze medalist(s)	12	—N/a
2014	31	10	8	92	2nd place, silver medalist(s)	—	5	—N/a
2015	32	10	8	86	14	9	—N/a	—N/a
2016	33	13	9	50	11	25	—N/a	18
2017	34	81	77	60	19	—	—	—N/a
2018	35	27	26	NC	20	—	5	—N/a
2019	36	30	20	NC	25	19	—	—N/a

==== Individual podiums ====
- 7 victories – (5 WC, 2 SWC)
- 24 podiums – (15 WC, 9 SWC)

No.	Season	Date	Location	Race	Level	Place
1	2009–10	29 November 2009	Rukatunturi, Finland	15 km Individual C	World Cup	2nd
2	2009–10	20 December 2009	Rogla, Slovenia	30 km Mass Start C	World Cup	3rd
3	2009–10	2 January 2010	Oberhof, Germany	15 km Pursuit C	Stage World Cup	2nd
4	2009–10	19 March 2010	Falun, Sweden	3.3 km Individual C	Stage World Cup	3rd
5	2009–10	21 March 2010	Falun, Sweden	15 km Pursuit F	Stage World Cup	2nd
6	2010–11	18 December 2010	La Clusaz, France	30 km Mass Start F	World Cup	1st
7	2010–11	22 January 2011	Otepää, Estonia	15 km Individual C	World Cup	3rd
8	2010–11	18 March 2011	Falun, Sweden	3.3 km Individual C	Stage World Cup	3rd
9	2011–12	1 January 2012	Oberstdorf, Germany	10 km + 10 km Skiathlon C/F	Stage World Cup	3rd
10	2011–12	5 February 2012	Rybinsk, Russia	15 km + 15 km Skiathlon C/F	World Cup	1st
11	2011–12	11 February 2012	Nové Město, Czech Republic	30 km Mass Start C	World Cup	3rd
12	2012–13	2 December 2012	Rukatunturi, Finland	15 km Pursuit C	Stage World Cup	1st
13	2012–13	30 November – 2 December 2012	(Finland) Nordic Opening	Overall Standings	World Cup	2nd
14	2012–13	30 December 2012	Oberhof, Germany	15 km Pursuit C	Stage World Cup	1st
15	2012–13	29 December 2012 – 6 January 2013	(Germany) (Switzerland) (Italy) Tour de Ski	Overall Standings	World Cup	3rd
16	2012–13	22 March 2013	Falun, Sweden	15 km Mass Start C	Stage World Cup	2nd
17	2013–14	29 November – 1 December 2013	(Finland) Nordic Opening	Overall Standings	World Cup	2nd
18	2013–14	19 January 2014	Szklarska Poręba, Poland	15 km Mass Start C	World Cup	1st
19	2014–15	25 January 2015	Rybinsk, Russia	15 km + 15 km Skiathlon C/F	World Cup	1st
20	2015–16	6 February 2016	Oslo, Norway	50 km Mass Start C	World Cup	3rd
21	2015–16	13 February 2016	Falun, Sweden	10 km Individual C	World Cup	1st
22	2017–18	10 March 2018	Oslo, Norway	50 km Mass Start F	World Cup	3rd
23	2017–18	18 March 2018	Falun, Sweden	15 km Pursuit F	Stage World Cup	3rd
24	2018–19	9 March 2019	Oslo, Norway	50 km Mass Start C	World Cup	2nd

==== Team podiums ====
- 4 victories – (2 RL, 2 TS)
- 10 podiums – (8 RL, 2 TS)

No.	Season	Date	Location	Race	Level	Place	Teammate(s)
1	2006–07	25 March 2007	Falun, Sweden	4 × 10 km Relay C/F	World Cup	2nd	Pankratov / Rochev / Legkov
2	2009–10	22 November 2009	Beitostølen, Norway	4 × 10 km Relay C/F	World Cup	2nd	Pankratov / Legkov / Chernousov
3	2010–11	21 November 2010	Gällivare, Sweden	4 × 10 km Relay C/F	World Cup	2nd	Belov / Sedov / Legkov
4	2010–11	19 December 2010	La Clusaz, France	4 × 10 km Relay C/F	World Cup	2nd	Belov / Legkov / Sedov
5	2010–11	6 February 2011	Rybinsk, Russia	4 × 10 km Relay C/F	World Cup	1st	Belov / Sedov / Legkov
6	2011–12	12 February 2012	Nové Město, Czech Republic	4 × 10 km Relay C/F	World Cup	2nd	Yaparov / Volzhentsev / Glavatskikh
7	2012–13	25 November 2012	Gällivare, Sweden	4 × 7.5 km Relay C/F	World Cup	3rd	Belov / Legkov / Chernousov
8	2012–13	3 February 2013	Sochi, Russia	6 × 1.8 km Team Sprint C	World Cup	1st	Yaparov
9	2013–14	8 December 2013	Lillehammer, Norway	4 × 7.5 km Relay C/F	World Cup	1st	Yaparov / Bessmertnykh / Legkov
10	2013–14	12 January 2014	Nové Město, Czech Republic	6 × 1.6 km Team Sprint C	World Cup	1st	Kryukov
