= Ilia Chernousov =

Russian cross-country skier

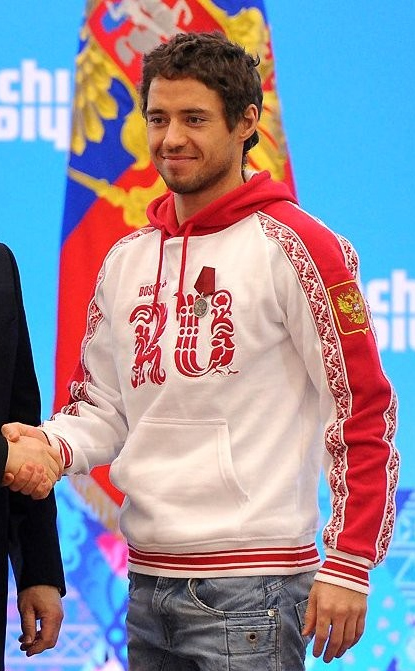
- Ilia Chernousov in 2014

Personal information
- Full name: Ilia Grigoryevich Chernousov
- Nationality: Russia
- Born: 7 August 1986 (age 39) Novosibirsk, Soviet Union
- Height: 175 cm (5 ft 9 in)

Sport
- Sport: Skiing

World Cup career
- Seasons: 10 – (2007–2016)
- Indiv. starts: 154
- Indiv. podiums: 9
- Indiv. wins: 2
- Team starts: 13
- Team podiums: 3
- Team wins: 1
- Overall titles: 0 – (6th in 2013)
- Discipline titles: 0
Medal record
Men's cross-country skiing
Representing Russia
Olympic Games
Bronze medal – third place	2014 Sochi	50 km freestyle
World Championships
Bronze medal – third place	2011 Oslo	30 km pursuit
U23 World Championships
Silver medal – second place	2007 Tarvisio	15 km freestyle
Silver medal – second place	2008 Mals	30 km freestyle
Junior World Championships
Gold medal – first place	2005 Rovaniemi	4 × 10 km relay
Silver medal – second place	2006 Kranj	20 km skiathlon
Silver medal – second place	2006 Kranj	4 × 5 km relay

Ilia Grigoryevich Chernousov (Russian: Илья Григорьевич Черноу́сов; born 7 August 1986) is a Russian cross-country skier. He won bronze medals at the 2011 World Championships and 2014 Winter Olympics.

== Career ==
Chernousov's first World Cup victory was in the 4×10 km relay in Switzerland in 2007. His best individual results came in the 30 km pursuit in 2011: a third place at the world championship and the first place at the world cup. At the FIS Nordic World Ski Championships 2007 in Sapporo, he finished 31st in the 15 km + 15 km double pursuit event.

At the 2014 Olympics Chernousov finished third in the 50 km freestyle. He was promoted to the first placed after the ban of gold and silver medalists, Alexander Legkov and Maxim Vylegzhanin. This decision was reversed in 2018. In the 30 km skiathlon Chernousov placed fifth.

In June 2014 Chernousov married the Swiss biathlete and fellow Olympic medalist Selina Gasparin.

== Cross-country skiing results ==
All results are sourced from the International Ski Federation (FIS).

=== Olympic Games ===
- 1 medal – (1 bronze)

Year	Age	15 km individual	30 km skiathlon	50 km mass start	Sprint	4 × 10 km relay	Team sprint
2014	27	—	5	Bronze	—	—	—

=== World Championships ===
- 1 medal – (1 bronze)

Year	Age	15 km individual	30 km skiathlon	50 km mass start	Sprint	4 × 10 km relay	Team sprint
2011	24	—	Bronze	12	—	7	—
2013	26	40	25	—	—	—	—
2015	28	—	15	—	—	—	—

=== World Cup ===
==== Season standings ====
Season	Age	Discipline standings			Ski Tour standings			
Season	Age	Overall	Distance	Sprint	Nordic Opening	Tour de Ski	World Cup Final	Ski Tour Canada
2007	20	66	98	NC	—N/a	18	—N/a	—N/a
2008	21	88	55	NC	—N/a	42	DNF	—N/a
2009	22	124	74	—	—N/a	—	—	—N/a
2010	23	29	16	117	—N/a	24	20	—N/a
2011	24	12	9	67	6	DNF	9	—N/a
2012	25	9	6	41	27	10	21	—N/a
2013	26	6	5	30	5	10	6	—N/a
2014	27	13	14	49	14	7	—	—N/a
2015	28	39	33	47	30	DNF	—N/a	—N/a
2016	29	76	46	NC	—	DNF	—N/a	33

==== Individual podiums ====
- 2 victories – (1 WC, 1 SWC)
- 9 podiums – (7 WC, 2 SWC)

No.	Season	Date	Location	Race	Level	Place
1	2009–10	23 January 2010	Rybinsk, Russia	15 km + 15 km Skiathlon C/F	World Cup	2nd
2	2009–10	6 March 2010	Lahti, Finland	15 km + 15 km Skiathlon C/F	World Cup	3rd
3	2010–11	28 November 2010	Rukatunturi, Finland	15 km Pursuit F	Stage World Cup	2nd
4	2010–11	4 February 2011	Rybinsk, Russia	10 km + 10 km Skiathlon C/F	World Cup	1st
5	2010–11	18 March 2011	Falun, Sweden	3.3 km Individual C	Stage World Cup	1st
6	2011–12	4 February 2012	Rybinsk, Russia	15 km Mass Start F	World Cup	2nd
7	2011–12	5 February 2012	Rybinsk, Russia	15 km + 15 km Skiathlon C/F	World Cup	2nd
8	2012–13	2 February 2013	Sochi, Russia	15 km + 15 km Skiathlon C/F	World Cup	2nd
9	2012–13	16 March 2013	Oslo, Norway	50 km Mass Start F	World Cup	3rd

==== Team podiums ====
- 1 victory – (1 RL)
- 3 podiums – (3 RL)

No.	Season	Date	Location	Race	Level	Place	Teammates
1	2006–07	4 February 2007	Davos, Switzerland	4 × 10 km Relay C/F	World Cup	1st	Babikov / Novikov / Shiryayev
2	2009–10	22 November 2009	Beitostølen, Norway	4 × 10 km Relay C/F	World Cup	2nd	Vylegzhanin / Pankratov / Legkov
3	2012–13	25 November 2012	Gällivare, Sweden	4 × 7.5 km Relay C/F	World Cup	3rd	Belov / Vylegzhanin / Legkov
