= Dario Cologna =

Swiss cross-country skier

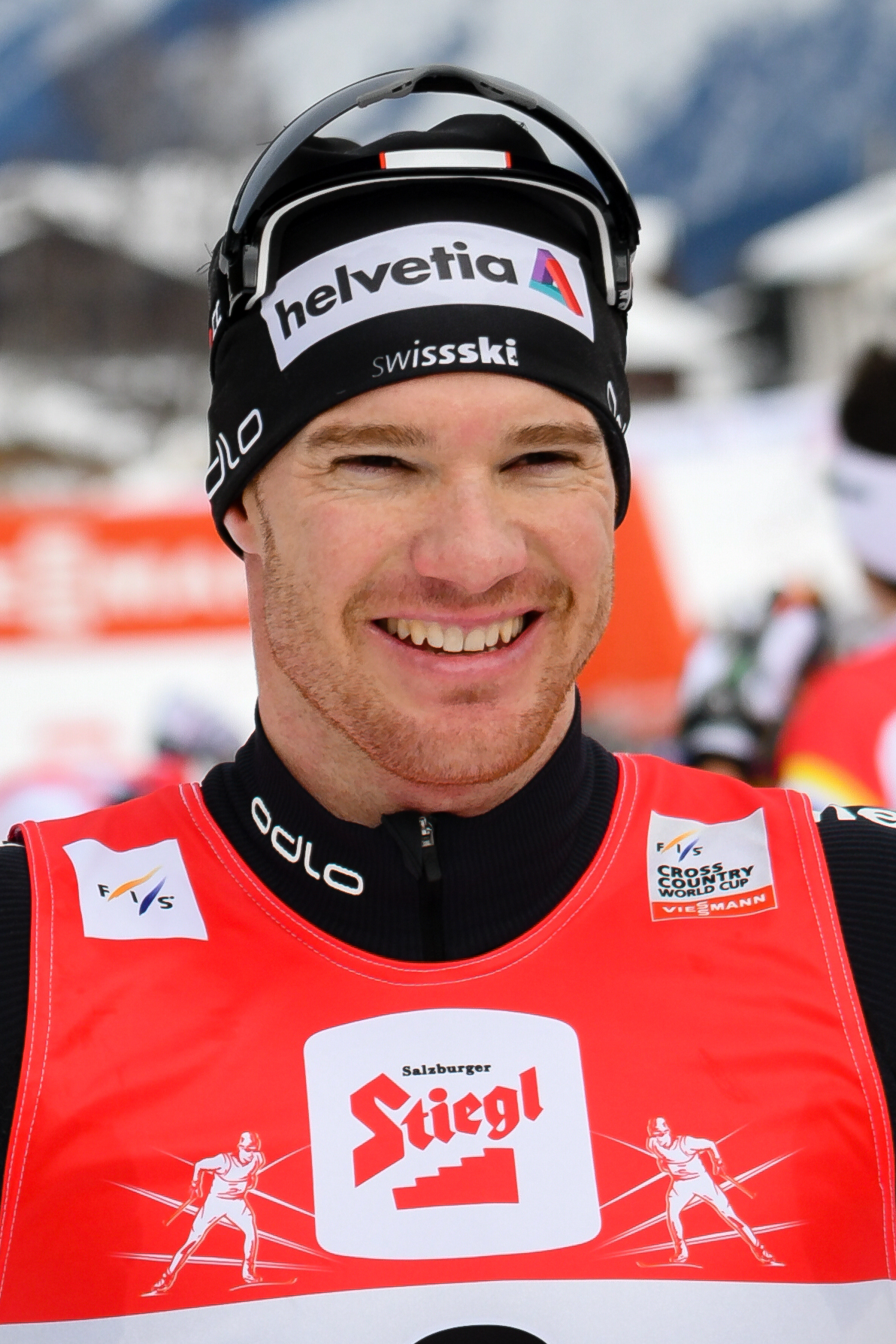
- Dario Cologna during World Cup competitions in Seefeld in Tirol, Austria, in January 2018

Personal information
- Nationality: Switzerland
- Born: 11 March 1986 (age 40) Santa Maria Val Müstair, Switzerland
- Height: 179 cm (5 ft 10 in)

Sport
- Sport: Skiing
- Club: SC Val Müstair

World Cup career
- Seasons: 16 – (2007–2022)
- Indiv. starts: 285
- Indiv. podiums: 73
- Indiv. wins: 26
- Team starts: 18
- Team podiums: 2
- Team wins: 1
- Overall titles: 4 – (2009, 2011, 2012, 2015)
- Discipline titles: 4 – (4 DI)
Medal record
Men's cross-country skiing
Representing Switzerland
International nordic ski competitions
Event	1st	2nd	3rd
Olympic Games	4	0	0
World Championships	1	2	0
Total	5	2	0
Olympic Games
Gold medal – first place	2010 Vancouver	15 km freestyle
Gold medal – first place	2014 Sochi	15 km classical
Gold medal – first place	2014 Sochi	30 km skiathlon
Gold medal – first place	2018 Pyeongchang	15 km freestyle
World Championships
Gold medal – first place	2013 Val di Fiemme	30 km skiathlon
Silver medal – second place	2013 Val di Fiemme	50 km classical
Silver medal – second place	2015 Falun	30 km skiathlon
U23 World Championships
Gold medal – first place	2007 Tarvisio	15 km freestyle
Gold medal – first place	2007 Tarvisio	30 km skiathlon
Gold medal – first place	2008 Mals	30 km freestyle
Junior World Championships
Bronze medal – third place	2006 Kranj	10 km classical
- Updated on 23 March 2022

Dario Cologna (born 11 March 1986) is a Swiss retired cross-country skier. He has four overall World Cup victories, four Olympic gold medals, one World Championships gold medal and four Tour de Ski victories in his career.

On 3 November 2021, he announced his retirement from cross-country skiing following the 2021–2022 season.

== Early life ==
Cologna is a native Rumantsch speaker. He was born in Santa Maria Val Müstair, in the Lower Engadine, to Italian parents. His father Remo is from Val di Non in Trentino, while his mother Christine is from Stelvio/Stilfs in South Tyrol.

He holds both Italian and Swiss citizenship.

He is the older brother of Swiss skier Gianluca Cologna.

== Career ==
=== Early career and the breakthrough 2008–09 season ===
In 2006, Dario Cologna won a bronze medal at the 10 km classic event in the Junior World Championships in Kranj, Slovenia. Cologna debuted in the FIS Cross-Country World Cup in Kuusamo in November 2006 and took his first points in Falun in March 2007. During the 2007–08 season, Cologna finished in the top ten four times and placed 37th overall.

In December 2008, Cologna took his first World Cup podium finish with second place in the 30-kilometre competition in La Clusaz. On 27 December, he won his first World Cup race as he finished first on the 15 km classic pursuit on stage two of the 2008–09 Tour de Ski. He went on to win the Tour in January 2009, finishing the final event almost a minute ahead of runner-up Petter Northug. Cologna also won the overall 2008–09 World Cup with more than 100 points in front of the runner-up after placing first twice and another three times on the podium.

=== 2010 and 2014 Olympics ===
He finished the 2009–10 FIS Cross-Country World Cup fourth, winning a race and taking two other podiums. He also came in third in the 2009–10 Tour de Ski. In the Vancouver 2010 Winter Olympics, he won the gold medal in the men's 15km freestyle event. Cologna is the first Swiss to win a cross-country skiing gold medal at the Winter Olympics.

Cologna won the 2010–11 FIS Cross-Country World Cup with more than 300 points ahead of Petter Northug, who came second. This season he won four races and took six other podiums, winning the 2010–11 Tour de Ski with 27 seconds ahead of Northug.

During the 2011–12 FIS Cross-Country World Cup season, Cologna won eight races and took twelve additional podium positions; his 20 podiums are, as of the 2018–19 season, still a record for most podiums in a season. On 8 January 2012, Cologna took his third Tour de Ski overall win in Val di Fiemme, winning the 2011–12 Tour de Ski. He finished more than a minute ahead of everyone else, with Marcus Hellner being second and Petter Northug third. With this performance, Cologna won his third Tour de Ski overall win, being the only male athlete ever to have done so. He also snatched the yellow jersey becoming world no. 1 in the 2011–12 FIS Cross-Country World Cup as of 8 January 2012.

At the World Championships 2013 in Val di Fiemme Cologna won the 30 km pursuit.

He won the 30 km skiathlon at the Sochi Olympics. Later in the games he successfully defended his title from the Vancouver Olympics in the 15 km race, this time in classic technique.

=== 2017–18 season: Fourth Tour de Ski and third consecutive Olympic 15 km ===
Cologna won his fourth Tour de Ski title by winning the 2017–18 edition. He won two of the six stages of the Tour, both in Lenzerheide, and won the overall standings with a margin of one minute and 26.5 seconds to second-placed Martin Johnsrud Sundby. With 4 Tour de Ski wins, he is second only to Johannes Klaebo in total number of wins for men. At the PyeongChang Olympics, Cologna won the 15 kilometre freestyle. He became the first cross-country skier to win three consecutive 15 km Olympic events. On 10 March 2018, he became the first Swiss to win the prestigious Holmenkollen 50 km.

He was awarded the Holmenkollen Medal in 2021.

== Cross-country skiing results ==
All results are sourced from the International Ski Federation (FIS).

=== Olympic Games ===
- 4 medals – (4 gold)

Year	Age	15 km individual	30 km skiathlon	50 km mass start	Sprint	4 × 10 km relay	Team sprint
2010	23	Gold	13	10	—	10	11
2014	27	Gold	Gold	25	26	—	5
2018	31	Gold	6	9	—	11	11
2022	35	44	—	14^{[a]}	—	7	—

^{a} Distance reduced to 30 km due to weather conditions.

=== World Championships ===
- 3 medals – (1 gold, 2 silver)

Year	Age	15 km individual	30 km skiathlon	50 km mass start	Sprint	4 × 10 km relay	Team sprint
2009	22	6	41	—	4	7	—
2011	24	25	24	20	9	9	—
2013	26	8	Gold	Silver	—	6	—
2015	28	18	Silver	6	—	5	—
2017	30	—	—	7	—	4	—
2019	32	6	14	7	—	8	—
2021	34	13	10	9	—	5	—

=== World Cup ===
==== Season titles ====
- 8 titles – (4 overall, 4 distance)

Season	
Season	Discipline
2009	Overall
2011	Overall
2011	Distance
2012	Overall
2012	Distance
2015	Overall
2015	Distance
2018	Distance

==== Season standings ====
Season	Age	Discipline standings			Ski Tour standings				
Season	Age	Overall	Distance	Sprint	Nordic Opening	Tour de Ski	Ski Tour 2020	World Cup Final	Ski Tour Canada
2007	21	145	94	—	—N/a	—	—N/a	—N/a	—N/a
2008	22	37	35	37	—N/a	30	—N/a	40	—N/a
2009	23	1st place, gold medalist(s)	2nd place, silver medalist(s)	9	—N/a	1st place, gold medalist(s)	—N/a	1st place, gold medalist(s)	—N/a
2010	24	4	4	13	—N/a	3rd place, bronze medalist(s)	—N/a	8	—N/a
2011	25	1st place, gold medalist(s)	1st place, gold medalist(s)	12	2nd place, silver medalist(s)	1st place, gold medalist(s)	—N/a	3rd place, bronze medalist(s)	—N/a
2012	26	1st place, gold medalist(s)	1st place, gold medalist(s)	6	2nd place, silver medalist(s)	1st place, gold medalist(s)	—N/a	1st place, gold medalist(s)	—N/a
2013	27	3rd place, bronze medalist(s)	2nd place, silver medalist(s)	9	4	2nd place, silver medalist(s)	—N/a	5	—N/a
2014	28	67	41	NC	—	—	—N/a	—	—N/a
2015	29	1st place, gold medalist(s)	1st place, gold medalist(s)	46	8	4	—N/a	—N/a	—N/a
2016	30	23	20	42	13	DNF	—N/a	—N/a	—
2017	31	7	9	54	26	3rd place, bronze medalist(s)	—N/a	5	—N/a
2018	32	2nd place, silver medalist(s)	1st place, gold medalist(s)	38	17	1st place, gold medalist(s)	—N/a	3rd place, bronze medalist(s)	—N/a
2019	33	23	19	69	10	DNF	—N/a	12	—N/a
2020	34	10	9	89	DNF	7	10	—N/a	—N/a
2021	35	11	9	46	30	8	—N/a	—N/a	—N/a
2022	36	58	32	NC	—N/a	DNF	—N/a	—N/a	—N/a

==== Individual podiums ====
- 26 victories – (15 WC, 11 SWC)
- 73 podiums – (40 WC, 33 SWC)

No.	Season	Date	Location	Race	Level	Place
1	2008–09	6 December 2008	La Clusaz, France	30 km Mass Start F	World Cup	2nd
2	2008–09	27 December 2008	Oberhof, Germany	3.75 km Individual F	Stage World Cup	2nd
3	2008–09	28 December 2008	Oberhof, Germany	15 km Pursuit C	Stage World Cup	1st
4	2008–09	27 December 2008 – 4 January 2009	(Germany) (Czech Republic) (Italy) Tour de Ski	Overall Standings	World Cup	1st
5	2008–09	20 March 2009	Falun, Sweden	3.3 km Individual F	Stage World Cup	2nd
6	2008–09	21 March 2009	Falun, Sweden	10 km + 10 km Pursuit C/F	Stage World Cup	1st
7	2008–09	18–22 March 2009	(Sweden) World Cup Final	Overall Standings	World Cup	1st
8	2009–10	6 January 2010	Cortina-Toblach, Italy	35 km Pursuit F	Stage World Cup	2nd
9	2009–10	1–10 January 2010	(Germany) (Czech Republic) (Italy) Tour de Ski	Overall Standings	World Cup	3rd
10	2009–10	5 February 2010	Canmore, Canada	15 km Individual F	World Cup	3rd
11	2009–10	6 February 2010	Canmore, Canada	1.7 km Sprint C	World Cup	3rd
12	2009–10	19 March 2010	Falun, Sweden	3.3 km Individual C	Stage World Cup	1st
13	2010–11	20 November 2010	Gällivare, Sweden	15 km Individual F	World Cup	2nd
14	2010–11	27 November 2010	Rukatunturi, Finland	10 km Individual C	Stage World Cup	1st
15	2010–11	26–28 November 2010	(Finland) Nordic Opening	Overall Standings	World Cup	2nd
16	2010–11	12 December 2010	Davos, Switzerland	1.4 km Sprint F	World Cup	3rd
17	2010–11	1 January 2011	Oberhof, Germany	15 km Pursuit C	Stage World Cup	1st
18	2010–11	2 January 2011	Oberstdorf, Germany	1.2 km Sprint C	Stage World Cup	3rd
19	2010–11	3 January 2011	Oberstdorf, Germany	10 km + 10 km Pursuit C/F	Stage World Cup	2nd
20	2010–11	5 January 2011	Toblach, Italy	1.3 km Sprint F	Stage World Cup	2nd
21	2010–11	6 January 2011	Cortina-Toblach, Italy	35 km Pursuit F	Stage World Cup	1st
22	2010–11	8 January 2011	Val di Fiemme, Italy	20 km Mass Start C	Stage World Cup	2nd
23	2010–11	31 December 2010 – 9 January 2011	(Germany) (Italy) Tour de Ski	Overall Standings	World Cup	1st
24	2010–11	12 March 2011	Lahti, Finland	10 km + 10 km Pursuit C/F	World Cup	1st
25	2010–11	16–20 March 2011	(Sweden) World Cup Final	Overall Standings	World Cup	3rd
26	2011–12	25–27 November 2011	(Finland) Nordic Opening	Overall Standings	World Cup	2nd
27	2011–12	17 December 2011	Rogla, Slovenia	15 km Mass Start C	World Cup	2nd
28	2011–12	18 December 2011	Rogla, Slovenia	1.2 km Sprint F	World Cup	1st
29	2011–12	29 December 2011	Oberhof, Germany	3.75 km Individual F	Stage World Cup	2nd
30	2011–12	30 December 2011	Oberhof, Germany	15 km Pursuit C	Stage World Cup	3rd
31	2011–12	1 January 2012	Oberstdorf, Germany	10 km + 10 km Skiathlon C/F	Stage World Cup	2nd
32	2011–12	2 January 2012	Toblach, Italy	5 km Individual C	Stage World Cup	3rd
33	2011–12	4 January 2012	Toblach, Italy	1.3 km Sprint F	Stage World Cup	3rd
34	2011–12	5 January 2011	Cortina-Toblach, Italy	35 km Pursuit F	Stage World Cup	1st
35	2011–12	7 January 2012	Val di Fiemme, Italy	20 km Mass Start C	Stage World Cup	3rd
36	2011–12	29 December 2011 – 8 January 2012	(Germany) (Italy) Tour de Ski	Overall Standings	World Cup	1st
37	2011–12	21 January 2012	Otepää, Estonia	1.4 km Sprint C	World Cup	1st
38	2011–12	22 January 2012	Otepää, Estonia	15 km Individual C	World Cup	1st
39	2011–12	11 January 2012	Nové Město, Czech Republic	30 km Mass Start C	World Cup	2nd
40	2011–12	18 January 2012	Szklarska Poręba, Poland	15 km Individual C	World Cup	2nd
41	2011–12	3 March 2012	Lahti, Finland	15 km + 15 km Skiathlon C/F	World Cup	1st
42	2011–12	10 March 2012	Oslo, Norway	50 km Mass Start C	World Cup	2nd
43	2011–12	16 March 2012	Falun, Sweden	3.3 km Individual F	Stage World Cup	2nd
44	2011–12	17 March 2012	Falun, Sweden	15 km Mass Start C	Stage World Cup	1st
45	2011–12	14–18 March 2012	(Sweden) World Cup Final	Overall Standings	World Cup	1st
46	2012–13	2 December 2012	Rukatunturi, Finland	15 km Pursuit C	Stage World Cup	2nd
47	2012–13	3 January 2013	Cortina-Toblach, Italy	35 km Pursuit F	Stage World Cup	3rd
48	2012–13	3 January 2013	Cortina-Toblach, Italy	5 km Individual C	Stage World Cup	3rd
49	2012–13	29 December 2012 – 6 January 2013	(Germany) (Switzerland) (Italy) Tour de Ski	Overall Standings	World Cup	2nd
50	2012–13	19 January 2013	La Clusaz, France	15 km Mass Start C	World Cup	3rd
51	2012–13	1 February 2013	Sochi, Russia	1.8 km Sprint F	World Cup	2nd
52	2012–13	2 February 2013	Sochi, Russia	15 km + 15 km Skiathlon C/F	World Cup	1st
53	2012–13	16 February 2013	Davos, Switzerland	1.5 km Sprint C	World Cup	2nd
54	2012–13	17 February 2013	Davos, Switzerland	15 km Individual F	World Cup	2nd
55	2013–14	1 February 2014	Toblach, Italy	15 km Individual C	World Cup	2nd
56	2014–15	13 December 2014	Davos, Switzerland	15 km Individual C	World Cup	2nd
57	2014–15	3 January 2015	Oberstdorf, Germany	4 km Individual F	Stage World Cup	1st
58	2014–15	10 January 2015	Val di Fiemme, Italy	15 km Mass Start C	Stage World Cup	3rd
59	2014–15	23 January 2015	Rybinsk, Russia	15 km Individual F	World Cup	1st
60	2014–15	1 February 2015	Rybinsk, Russia	15 km + 15 km Skiathlon C/F	World Cup	2nd
61	2014–15	14 March 2015	Oslo, Norway	50 km Mass Start F	World Cup	2nd
62	2015–16	28 November 2015	Rukatunturi, Finland	10 km Individual F	Stage World Cup	3rd
63	2015–16	6 January 2016	Oberstdorf, Germany	15 km Mass Start C	Stage World Cup	2nd
64	2016–17	3 January 2017	Oberstdorf, Germany	10 km + 10 km Skiathlon C/F	Stage World Cup	3rd
65	2016–17	31 December 2016 – 8 January 2017	(Switzerland) (Germany) (Italy) Tour de Ski	Overall Standings	World Cup	3rd
66	2017–18	31 December 2017	Lenzerheide, Switzerland	15 km Individual C	Stage World Cup	1st
67	2017–18	1 January 2018	Lenzerheide, Switzerland	15 km Pursuit F	Stage World Cup	1st
68	2017–18	30 December 2017 – 7 January 2018	(Switzerland) (Germany) (Italy) Tour de Ski	Overall Standings	World Cup	1st
69	2017–18	28 January 2018	Seefeld, Austria	15 km Mass Start F	World Cup	1st
70	2017–18	10 March 2018	Oslo, Norway	50 km Mass Start F	World Cup	1st
71	2017–18	16–18 March 2018	(Sweden) World Cup Final	Overall Standings	World Cup	3rd
72	2019–20	15 December 2019	Davos, Switzerland	15 km Individual F	World Cup	3rd
73	2020–21	2 January 2021	Val Müstair, Switzerland	15 km Mass Start C	Stage World Cup	2nd

==== Team podiums ====
- 1 victory – (1 RL)
- 2 podiums – (2 RL)

No.	Season	Date	Location	Race	Level	Place	Teammates
1	2010–11	19 December 2010	La Clusaz, France	4 × 10 km Relay C/F	World Cup	1st	Livers / Fischer / Perl
2	2019–20	1 March 2020	Lahti, Finland	4 × 7.5 km Relay C/F	World Cup	2nd	Klee / Rüesch / Furger

Awards and achievements
Preceded by Roger Federer	Swiss Sportsman of the Year; 2013	Succeeded by Roger Federer
Olympic Games
Preceded by Simon Ammann	Flagbearer for Switzerland; Pyeongchang 2018	Succeeded by Incumbent
