= Cross-country skiing at the 2014 Winter Olympics – Men's 50 kilometre freestyle =

Men's 50 kilometre freestyle at the XXII Olympic Winter Games
- Venue: Laura Biathlon & Ski Complex
- Dates: 23 February 2014
- Competitors: 64 from 26 nations
- Winning time: 1:46:55.2

Medalists
1st place, gold medalist(s)		Alexander Legkov	Russia
2nd place, silver medalist(s)		Maxim Vylegzhanin	Russia
3rd place, bronze medalist(s)		Ilia Chernousov	Russia

The men's 50 kilometre freestyle cross-country skiing competition at the 2014 Sochi Olympics took place on 23 February at Laura Biathlon & Ski Complex.

== Summary ==
Initially, the podium was taken by Alexander Legkov (gold), Maxim Vylegzhanin (silver), and Ilia Chernousov (bronze), all representing Russia. This was the first clean sweep in men's cross-country skiing since 1992, when all medals were won by Norwegians, and the first ever for the Soviet Union/Russia.

In November 2017, Legkov and Vylegzhanin were disqualified for doping offences, and their gold and silver medals respectively were stripped. On 1 February 2018, their results were restored as a result of the successful appeal.

== Qualification ==
Athletes with a maximum of 100 FIS distance points (the A standard) were allowed to compete in either the sprint or distance events, or both. Athletes with a maximum 120 FIS sprint points were allowed to compete in the sprint and distance (10 km for women or 15 km for men), provided their distance points did not exceed 300 FIS points. National Olympic Committees who did not have any athletes meeting the A standard could enter one competitor of each gender, known as the basic quota, in only the classical event (10 km for women and 15 km for men). They must have a maximum of 300 FIS distance points at the end of qualifying on 20 January 2014. The qualification period began in July 2012.

== Results ==
The race started at 11:00.

Rank	Bib	Name	Country	Time	Deficit
1st place, gold medalist(s)	3	Alexander Legkov	Russia	1:46:55.2	—
2nd place, silver medalist(s)	7	Maxim Vylegzhanin	Russia	1:46:55.9	+0.7
3rd place, bronze medalist(s)	8	Ilia Chernousov	Russia	1:46:56.0	+0.8
4	1	Martin Johnsrud Sundby	Norway	1:46:56.2	+1.0
5	40	Sergei Dolidovich	Belarus	1:47:09.5	+14.3
6	10	Robin Duvillard	France	1:47:10.1	+14.9
7	21	Anders Södergren	Sweden	1:47:13.0	+17.8
8	12	Daniel Rickardsson	Sweden	1:47:19.6	+24.4
9	19	Johan Olsson	Sweden	1:47:27.3	+32.1
10	42	Iivo Niskanen	Finland	1:47:27.5	+32.3
11	20	Roland Clara	Italy	1:47:28.6	+33.4
12	27	Curdin Perl	Switzerland	1:47:31.3	+36.1
13	30	Ivan Perrillat Boiteux	France	1:47:31.7	+36.5
14	43	Martin Bajčičák	Slovakia	1:47:34.4	+39.2
15	13	Matti Heikkinen	Finland	1:47:35.0	+39.8
16	49	David Hofer	Italy	1:47:35.7	+40.5
17	29	Michail Semenov	Belarus	1:47:36.0	+40.8
18	5	Petter Northug	Norway	1:47:39.7	+44.5
19	4	Alex Harvey	Canada	1:47:40.9	+45.7
20	14	Ivan Babikov	Canada	1:47:41.8	+46.6
21	17	Tord Asle Gjerdalen	Norway	1:47:43.5	+48.3
22	36	Remo Fischer	Switzerland	1:47:44.2	+49.0
23	25	Lari Lehtonen	Finland	1:47:48.7	+53.5
24	45	Bernhard Tritscher	Austria	1:47:51.7	+56.5
25	33	Francesco de Fabiani	Italy	1:47:51.8	+56.6
26	22	Noah Hoffman	United States	1:48:04.3	+1:09.1
27	18	Dario Cologna	Switzerland	1:48:21.6	+1:26.4
28	38	Graeme Killick	Canada	1:48:22.4	+1:27.2
29	28	Petr Novák	Czech Republic	1:48:41.0	+1:45.8
30	35	Toni Livers	Switzerland	1:48:49.9	+1:54.7
31	16	Lukáš Bauer	Czech Republic	1:48:51.3	+1:56.1
32	2	Chris Jespersen	Norway	1:49:21.3	+2:26.1
33	50	Imanol Rojo	Spain	1:49:21.9	+2:26.7
34	48	Mark Starostin	Kazakhstan	1:49:34.1	+2:38.9
35	11	Jean-Marc Gaillard	France	1:49:49.7	+2:54.5
36	15	Thomas Bing	Germany	1:49:56.1	+3:00.9
37	26	Martin Jakš	Czech Republic	1:50:00.5	+3:05.3
38	23	Konstantin Glavatskikh	Russia	1:50:33.4	+3:38.2
39	24	Axel Teichmann	Germany	1:51:03.4	+4:08.2
40	62	Arnd Peiffer	Germany	1:51:31.5	+4:36.3
41	60	Andrey Gridin	Bulgaria	1:51:41.7	+4:46.5
42	56	Erik Lesser	Germany	1:51:55.8	+5:00.6
43	9	Maurice Manificat	France	1:52:01.6	+5:06.4
44	41	Aivar Rehemaa	Estonia	1:52:22.1	+5:26.9
45	61	Martin Møller	Denmark	1:52:32.7	+5:37.5
46	52	Aliaksei Ivanou	Belarus	1:52:52.9	+5:57.7
47	51	Javier Gutiérrez Cuevas	Spain	1:53:02.5	+6:07.3
48	54	Yerdos Akhmadiyev	Kazakhstan	1:53:07.4	+6:12.2
49	53	Karel Tammjärv	Estonia	1:53:23.0	+6:27.8
50	55	Milanko Petrović	Serbia	1:53:35.1	+6:39.9
51	39	Brian Gregg	United States	1:55:02.3	+8:07.1
52	32	Jiří Magál	Czech Republic	1:56:28.7	+9:33.5
53	44	Andrew Musgrave	Great Britain	1:57:08.9	+10:13.7
54	47	Sergey Cherepanov	Kazakhstan	1:57:24.2	+10:29.0
55	34	Yevgeniy Velichko	Kazakhstan	1:58:10.6	+11:15.4
56	46	Jesse Cockney	Canada	1:59:16.6	+12:21.4
57	31	Kris Freeman	United States	1:59:46.7	+12:51.5
58	58	Edi Dadić	Croatia	2:02:35.5	+15:40.3
59	63	Arvis Liepiņš	Latvia	2:04:45.6	+17:50.4
60	64	Xu Wenlong	China	2:08:02.0	+21:06.8
	66	Darko Damjanovski	Macedonia	DNF	DNF
	37	Veselin Tzinzov	Bulgaria	DNF	DNF
	65	Mladen Plakalović	Bosnia and Herzegovina	DNF	DNF
	59	Martti Jylhä	Finland	DNF	DNF
	6	Johannes Dürr	Austria	DNS	DNS
	57	Torin Koos	United States	DNS	DNS
