= Cross-country skiing at the 2014 Winter Olympics =

Cross-country skiing at the XXII Olympic Winter Games
- Venue: Laura Biathlon & Ski Complex, Krasnaya Polyana, Russia
- Dates: 8–23 February 2014
- No. of events: 12
- Competitors: 310 from 54 nations

Cross-country skiing at the 2014 Winter Olympics was held at the Laura Biathlon & Ski Complex near Krasnaya Polyana, Russia. The twelve events took place between 8–23 February 2014.

== Competition schedule ==
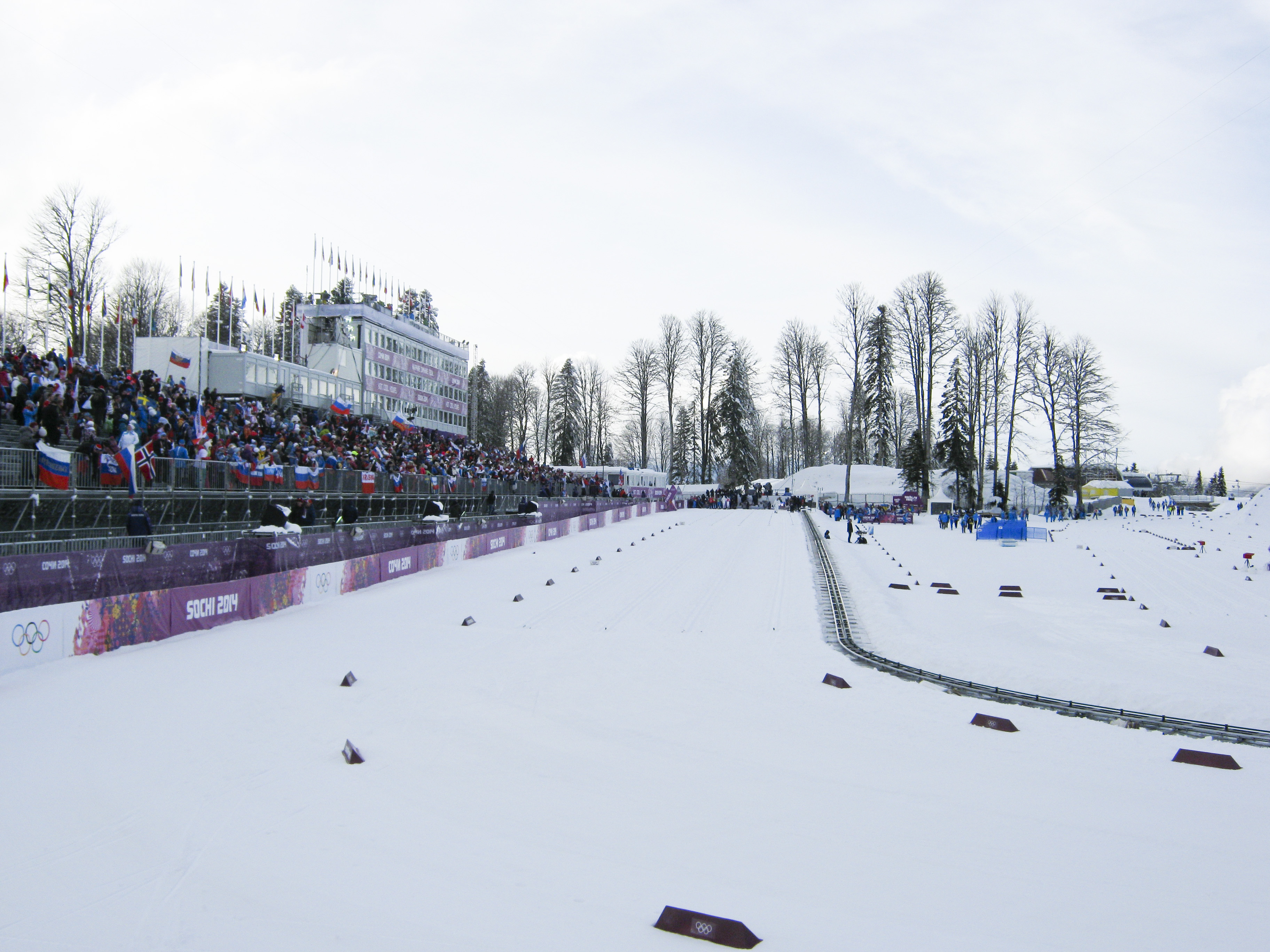
The Laura Biathlon & Ski Complex during the 2014 Winter Olympics

The following is the competition schedule for all twelve events.

All times are (UTC+4).

Date	Time	Event
8 February	14:00	Women's skiathlon
9 February	14:00	Men's skiathlon
11 February	14:00	Individual sprint free men/women qualifying
11 February	16:00	Individual sprint free men/women finals
13 February	14:00	Women's 10 km classical
14 February	14:00	Men's 15 km classical
15 February	14:00	4 x 5 km relay women
16 February	14:00	4 x 10 km relay men
19 February	13:15	Team sprint classical men/women qualifying
19 February	15:45	Team sprint classical men/women finals
22 February	13:30	Women's 30 km mass start free
23 February	11:00	Men's 50 km mass start free

== Medal summary ==
=== Medal table ===
* Host nation (Russia)

Rank	Nation	Gold	Silver	Bronze	Total
1	Norway	5	2	4	11
2	Sweden	2	5	4	11
3	Switzerland	2	0	0	2
4	Russia*	1	3	1	5
5	Finland	1	2	0	3
6	Poland	1	0	0	1
7	France	0	0	1	1
7	Germany	0	0	1	1
7	Slovenia	0	0	1	1
Totals (9 entries)		12	12	12	36

=== Men's events ===
Event	Gold		Silver		Bronze	
15 km classical	Dario Cologna; Switzerland	38:29.7	Johan Olsson; Sweden	38:58.2	Daniel Richardsson; Sweden	39:08.5
30 km skiathlon	Dario Cologna; Switzerland	1:08:15.4	Marcus Hellner; Sweden	1:08:15.8	Martin Johnsrud Sundby; Norway	1:08:16.8
50 km freestyle^{[a]}	Alexander Legkov; Russia	1:46:55.2	Maxim Vylegzhanin; Russia	1:46:55.9	Ilia Chernousov; Russia	1:46:56.0
4 × 10 km relay^{[b]}	Sweden; Lars Nelson; Daniel Richardsson; Johan Olsson; Marcus Hellner	1:28:42.0	Russia; Dmitry Yaparov; Alexander Bessmertnykh; Alexander Legkov; Maxim Vylegzhanin	1:29:09.3	France; Jean-Marc Gaillard; Maurice Manificat; Robin Duvillard; Ivan Perrillat Boiteux	1:29:13.9
Sprint	Ola Vigen Hattestad; Norway	3:38.4	Teodor Peterson; Sweden	3:39.6	Emil Jönsson; Sweden	3:55.2
Team sprint^{[c]}	Finland; Iivo Niskanen; Sami Jauhojärvi	23:14.89	Russia; Maxim Vylegzhanin; Nikita Kriukov	23:15.86	Sweden; Emil Jönsson; Teodor Peterson	23:30.01

- ^{men's 50 km} In November 2017, Alexander Legkov and Maxim Vylegzhanin of Russia were disqualified by IOC and stripped of their gold and silver medal, but Court of Arbitration for Sport nullified the disqualifications and returned the medals to the Russian athletes on 1 February 2018.
- ^{men's 4 × 10 km} In November 2017, Alexander Legkov and Maxim Vylegzhanin of Russia were disqualified by IOC and the Russian team was stripped of its silver medal, but Court of Arbitration for Sport nullified the disqualifications and returned the medal to the Russian team on 1 February 2018.
- ^{men's team sprint} In November 2017, Maxim Vylegzhanin of Russia was disqualified by IOC and the Russian team was stripped of its silver medal, but Court of Arbitration for Sport nullified the disqualification and returned the medal to the Russian team on 1 February 2018.

=== Women's events ===
Event	Gold		Silver		Bronze	
10 km classical	Justyna Kowalczyk; Poland	28:17.8	Charlotte Kalla; Sweden	28:36.2	Therese Johaug; Norway	28:46.1
15 km skiathlon	Marit Bjørgen; Norway	38:33.6	Charlotte Kalla; Sweden	38:35.4	Heidi Weng; Norway	38:46.8
30 km freestyle	Marit Bjørgen; Norway	1:11:05.2	Therese Johaug; Norway	1:11:07.8	Kristin Størmer Steira; Norway	1:11:28.8
4 × 5 km relay	Sweden; Ida Ingemarsdotter; Emma Wikén; Anna Haag; Charlotte Kalla	53:02.7	Finland; Anne Kyllönen; Aino-Kaisa Saarinen; Kerttu Niskanen; Krista Lähteenmäki	53:03.2	Germany; Nicole Fessel; Stefanie Böhler; Claudia Nystad; Denise Herrmann	53:03.6
Sprint	Maiken Caspersen Falla; Norway	2:35.49	Ingvild Flugstad Østberg; Norway	2:35.87	Vesna Fabjan; Slovenia	2:35.89
Team sprint	Norway; Ingvild Flugstad Østberg; Marit Bjørgen	16:04.05	Finland; Aino-Kaisa Saarinen; Kerttu Niskanen	16:13.14	Sweden; Ida Ingemarsdotter; Stina Nilsson	16:23.82

== Qualification ==
A maximum of 310 quota spots were available to athletes to compete at the games. A maximum of 20 athletes could be entered by a National Olympic Committee, with a maximum of 12 men or 12 women. There were two qualification standards for the games: an A standard and a B standard.

== Participating nations ==
310 athletes from 54 nations participated, with number of athletes in parentheses. Chile made its Olympic debut in the sport. Dominica, qualified for the Winter Olympics for the first time, and its two athletes competed in cross-country skiing. India's athlete was planned to compete as an Independent Olympic Participants, as the Indian Olympic Association was suspended by the International Olympic Committee, but the suspension had since been lifted.

- Argentina (1)
- Armenia (3)
- Australia (4)
- Austria (8)
- Belarus (6)
- Bermuda (1)
- Bosnia and Herzegovina (2)
- Brazil (2)
- Bulgaria (4)
- Canada (13)
- Chile (1)
- China (4)
- Croatia (2)
- Czech Republic (10)
- Denmark (1)
- Dominica (2)
- Estonia (7)
- Finland (17)
- France (15)
- Germany (18)
- Great Britain (4)
- Greece (2)
- Hungary (2)
- Iceland (1)
- India (1)
- Iran (2)
- Ireland (1)
- Italy (16)
- Japan (6)
- Kazakhstan (11)
- Latvia (3)
- Liechtenstein (1)
- Lithuania (2)
- Luxembourg (1)
- Macedonia (2)
- Moldova (2)
- Mongolia (2)
- Nepal (1)
- Norway (20)
- Peru (1)
- Poland (10)
- Romania (3)
- Russia (20)
- Serbia (3)
- Slovakia (4)
- Slovenia (5)
- South Korea (2)
- Spain (3)
- Sweden (19)
- Switzerland (14)
- Togo (1)
- Turkey (2)
- Ukraine (8)
- United States (14)
