= Annika Taylor =

British-American cross-country skier

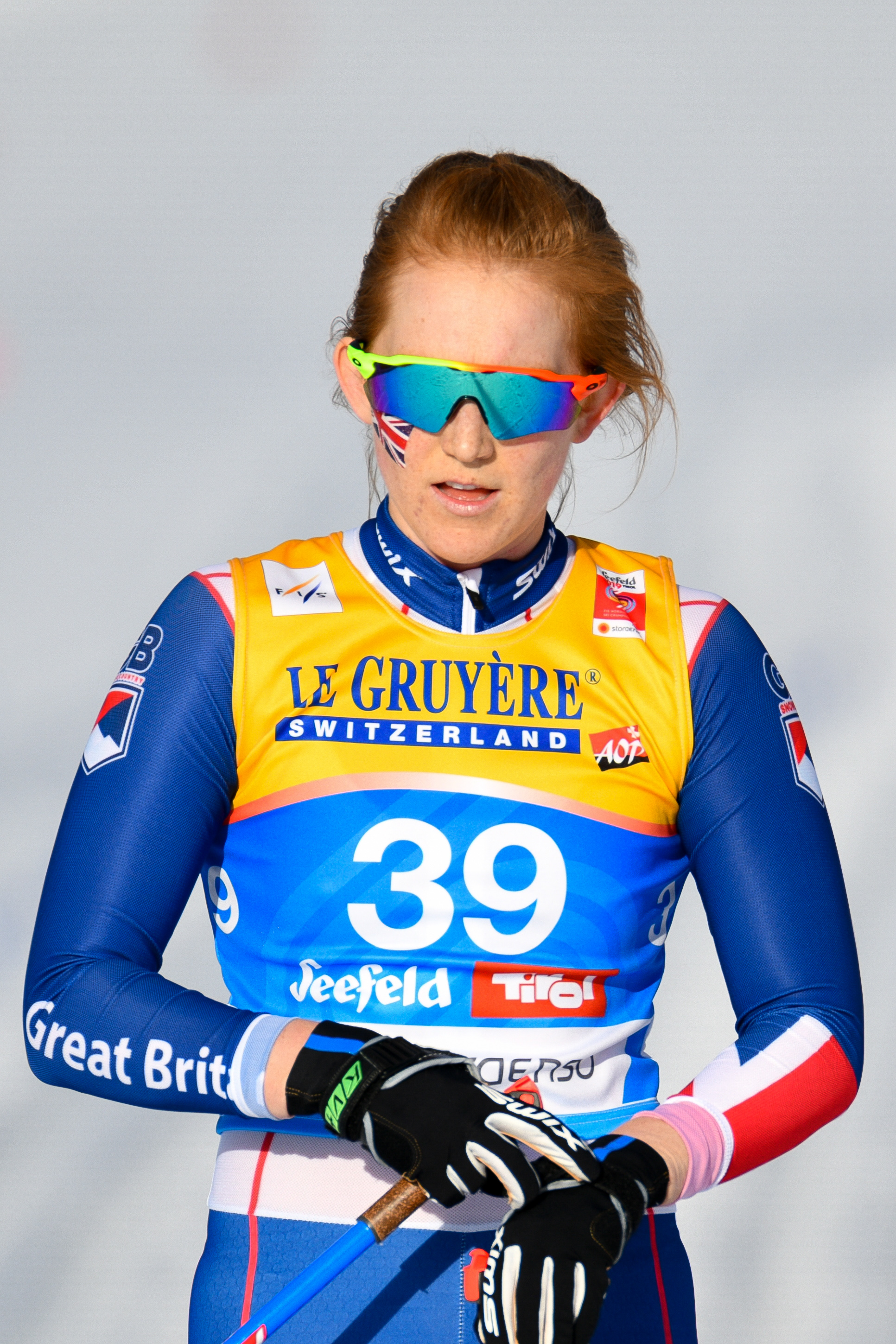

Personal information
- Nationality: Great Britain; United States
- Born: June 4, 1993 (age 33) Truckee, California, United States

Sport
- Sport: Skiing
- Club: Lillehammer SK

World Cup career
- Seasons: 4 – (2016–2019)
- Indiv. starts: 35
- Indiv. podiums: 0
- Team starts: 1
- Team podiums: 0
- Overall titles: 0
- Discipline titles: 0
- Updated on 12 December 2019

Annika Taylor (born 4 June 1993) is a cross-country skier with joint British and American nationality.

== Early life and education ==
Born in Truckee, California, Taylor is the daughter of Betsy and Peter Taylor. She holds British and American citizenship as her father is originally from the United Kingdom.

She has been cross-country skiing since the age of 2 and racing since the age of 5. As a junior, she raced for California's Auburn Ski Club and the Far West Nordic Ski Education Association, winning three CNISSF State Championships and notching three top-10 finishes at the USSA Junior Championships.

After graduating from Truckee High School, she attended the University of New Hampshire. She raced for the New Hampshire Wildcats skiing team from 2011 to 2015, while pursuing a degree in chemistry and graduating in 2015 May.

== Skiing career ==
=== 2012-2013 season ===
In 2013 January, Taylor won the 15 km free mass start at Colby College Winter Carnival, which is her first FIS race win of her career.

=== 2013-2014 season ===
In 2013 November, she changed her nationality from the United States to the United Kingdom. In 2014 January, her first racing for British came at the Swiss National Championships in Leysin. In 2014 February, she competed in the 2014 FIS U23 Cross-Country World Championships at Val di Fiemme, her best result was 35th in the Skiathlon.

=== 2014-2015 season ===
In 2015 February, she won the 5 km free at Middlebury College Winter Carnival, which is her second FIS race win of her career. In 2015 March, she competed in the 2015 NCAA Skiing Championships at Lake Placid. She raced to 7th in the 15 km classic, the mark earned her All-American status.

=== 2015-2016 season ===
After graduating from university in 2015 May, she started skiing full-time and continued skiing for British National Team. At the same time, she joined the Sugar Bowl Academy, which is based in Norden. In 2015 November, she made her FIS Cross-Country World Cup debut in Ruka, placed 50th in the Sprint classic. In 2016 February, she competed in the 2016 FIS U23 Cross-Country World Championships at Râșnov, her best result was 30th in the 10 km free. At the end of 2016 season, she competed in the 2016 Ski Tour Canada, placed 42nd overall.

=== 2016-2017 season ===
In 2016 May, she moved to Lillehammer and joined the Team Coop Talent, which is the elite branch off of the Lillehammer SK. In 2017 February, she competed in the FIS Nordic World Ski Championships 2017 at Lahti, her best result was 38th in the sprint freestyle and 30 km freestyle mass start.

== Cross-country skiing results ==
All results are sourced from the International Ski Federation (FIS).

=== Olympic Games ===
Year	Age	10 km individual	15 km skiathlon	30 km mass start	Sprint	4 × 5 km relay	Team sprint
2018	24	76	60	—	—	—	—

=== World Championships ===
Year	Age	10 km individual	15 km skiathlon	30 km mass start	Sprint	4 × 5 km relay	Team sprint
2017	23	58	41	38	38	—	—
2019	25	58	—	—	53	—	16

=== World Cup ===
==== Season standings ====
Season	Age	Discipline standings			Ski Tour standings			
Season	Age	Overall	Distance	Sprint	Nordic Opening	Tour de Ski	World Cup Final	Ski Tour Canada
2016	22	NC	NC	NC	62	DNF	—N/a	42
2017	23	NC	NC	NC	—	DNF	47	—N/a
2018	24	NC	NC	NC	77	—	—	—N/a
2019	25	NC	—	NC	DNF	—	—	—N/a
