= Niklas Dyrhaug =

Norwegian cross-country skier (born 1987)

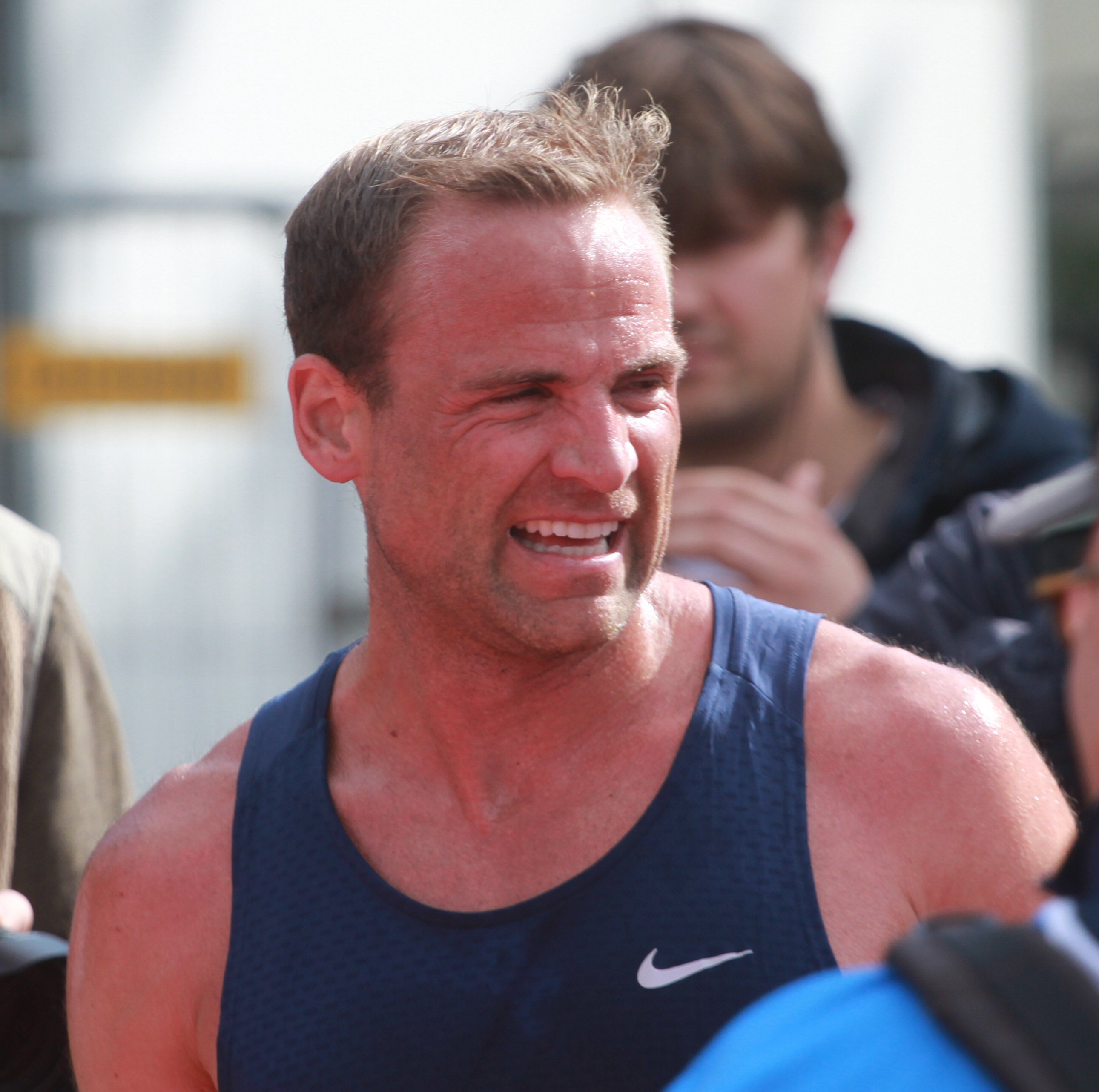
- Dyrhaug competing in 2017

Personal information
- Nationality: Norway
- Born: 6 July 1987 (age 39) Tydal Municipality, Norway

Sport
- Sport: Skiing
- Club: Tydal IL

World Cup career
- Seasons: 10 – (2010–2018, 2020)
- Indiv. starts: 112
- Indiv. podiums: 7
- Indiv. wins: 1
- Team starts: 7
- Team podiums: 2
- Team wins: 2
- Overall titles: 0 – (6th in 2016)
- Discipline titles: 0
Medal record
Men's cross-country skiing
Representing Norway
World Championships
Gold medal – first place	2015 Falun	4 × 10 km relay
Gold medal – first place	2017 Lahti	4 × 10 km relay
Bronze medal – third place	2017 Lahti	15 km classical

Niklas Dyrhaug (born 6 July 1987) is a Norwegian, former cross-country skier. He competed in the World Cup for ten years.

He represented Norway at the FIS Nordic World Ski Championships 2015 in Falun winning a gold medal in the 4 × 10 km relay. He also represented Norway at the FIS Nordic World Ski Championships 2017 in Lahti winning a bronze medal in the 15 km classical race.

He announced his retirement from cross-country skiing in October 2021.

== Cross-country skiing results ==
All results are sourced from the International Ski Federation (FIS).

=== Olympic Games ===
Year	Age	15 km individual	30 km skiathlon	50 km mass start	Sprint	4 × 10 km relay	Team sprint
2018	30	—	—	13	—	—	—

=== World Championships ===
- 3 medals – (2 gold, 1 bronze)

Year	Age	15 km individual	30 km skiathlon	50 km mass start	Sprint	4 × 10 km relay	Team sprint
2015	27	—	7	13	—	Gold	—
2017	29	Bronze	—	—	—	Gold	—

=== World Cup ===
==== Season standings ====
Season	Age	Discipline standings			Ski Tour standings			
Season	Age	Overall	Distance	Sprint	Nordic Opening	Tour de Ski	World Cup Final	Ski Tour Canada
2010	22	NC	NC	—	—N/a	—	—	—N/a
2011	23	140	88	—	—	—	—	—N/a
2012	24	16	16	74	—	16	3rd place, bronze medalist(s)	—N/a
2013	25	105	67	NC	31	DNF	—	—N/a
2014	26	52	48	NC	—	16	—	—N/a
2015	27	7	6	74	9	6	—N/a	—N/a
2016	28	6	3rd place, bronze medalist(s)	41	5	8	—N/a	DNF
2017	29	8	5	56	12	10	3rd place, bronze medalist(s)	—N/a
2018	30	25	24	NC	—	12	9	—N/a

==== Individual podiums ====
- 1 victory – (1 SWC)
- 7 podiums – (4 WC, 3 SWC)

No.	Season	Date	Location	Race	Level	Place
1	2011–12	14–18 March 2012	(Sweden) World Cup Final	Overall Standings	World Cup	3rd
2	2015–16	29 November 2015	Rukatunturi, Finland	15 km Pursuit C	Stage World Cup	1st
3	2015–16	5 December 2015	Lillehammer, Norway	15 km + 15 km Skiathlon C/F	World Cup	2nd
4	2015–16	9 January 2016	Val di Fiemme, Italy	15 km Mass Start C	Stage World Cup	2nd
5	2015–16	6 February 2016	(Norway) Oslo, Italy	50 km Mass Start C	World Cup	2nd
6	2016–17	18 March 2017	Quebec City, Canada	15 km Mass Start C	Stage World Cup	2nd
7	2016–17	17–19 March 2017	(Canada) World Cup Final	Overall Standings	World Cup	3rd

==== Team podiums ====
- 2 victories – (2 RL)
- 2 podium – (2 RL)

No.	Season	Date	Location	Race	Level	Place	Teammates
1	2011–12	12 February 2012	Nové Město, Czech Republic	4 × 10 km Relay C/F	World Cup	1st	Rønning / Sundby / Northug
2	2015–16	6 December 2015	Lillehammer, Norway	4 × 7.5 km Relay C/F	World Cup	1st	Holund / Sundby / Northug
