= Lucas Chanavat =

French cross-country skier (born 1994)

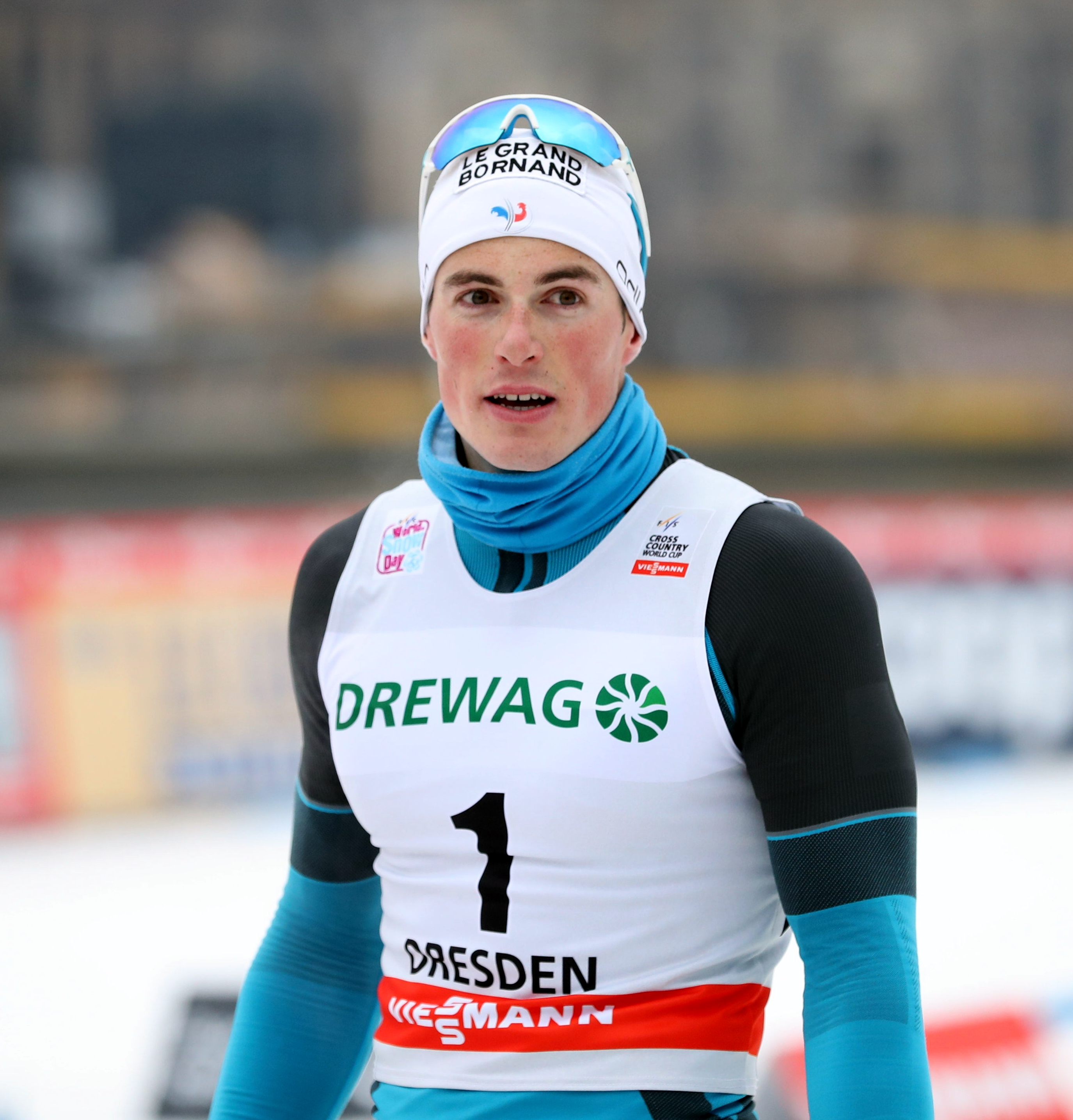
- Chanavat in 2018

Personal information
- Nationality: France
- Born: 17 December 1994 (age 31) Le Grand-Bornand, France

Sport
- Sport: Skiing
- Club: SC Le Grand Bornand

World Cup career
- Seasons: 11 – (2016–present)
- Indiv. starts: 134
- Indiv. podiums: 25
- Indiv. wins: 5
- Team starts: 14
- Team podiums: 3
- Team wins: 1
- Overall titles: 0 – (10th in 2022)
- Discipline titles: 0
Medal record
Men's cross-country skiing
Representing France
U23 World Championships
Gold medal – first place	2016 Râșnov	Individual sprint
- Updated on 22 March 2026

Lucas Chanavat (born 17 December 1994) is a French cross-country skier who represents the club Le Grand Bornand.

He competed at the FIS Nordic World Ski Championships 2017 in Lahti, Finland.

== Cross-country skiing results ==
All results are sourced from the International Ski Federation (FIS).

=== Olympic Games ===
Year	Age	15 km individual	30 km skiathlon	50 km mass start	Sprint	4 × 10 km relay	Team sprint
2018	23	—	—	—	34	—	—
2022	27	—	—	—^{[a]}	9	—	—
2026	31	—	—	—	19	—	—

^{a} Distance reduced to 30 km due to weather conditions.

=== World Championships ===
Year	Age	15 km individual	30 km skiathlon	50 km mass start	Sprint	4 × 10 km relay	Team sprint
2017	22	—	—	—	14	—	11
2019	24	—	—	—	6	—	5
2021	26	—	—	—	22	—	4
2023	28	—	—	—	6	—	—
2025	30	—	—	—	6	—	—

=== World Cup ===
==== Season standings ====
Season	Age	Discipline standings				Ski Tour standings				
Season	Age	Overall	Distance	Sprint	U23	Nordic Opening	Tour de Ski	Ski Tour 2020	World Cup Final	Ski Tour Canada
2016	21	92	—	52	10	—	—	—N/a	—N/a	—
2017	22	27	NC	8	3rd place, bronze medalist(s)	—	DNF	—N/a	51	—N/a
2018	23	24	NC	3rd place, bronze medalist(s)	—N/a	DNF	DNF	—N/a	DNF	—N/a
2019	24	22	NC	6	—N/a	DNF	DNF	—N/a	DNF	—N/a
2020	25	22	NC	5	—N/a	DNF	DNF	DNF	—N/a	—N/a
2021	26	28	NC	5	—N/a	DNF	DNF	—N/a	—N/a	—N/a
2022	27	10	NC	3rd place, bronze medalist(s)	—N/a	—N/a	DNF	—N/a	—N/a	—N/a
2023	28	14	NC	2nd place, silver medalist(s)	—N/a	—N/a	DNF	—N/a	—N/a	—N/a
2024	29	18	NC	3rd place, bronze medalist(s)	—N/a	—N/a	53	—N/a	—N/a	—N/a
2025	30	19	NC	4	—N/a	—N/a	DNF	—N/a	—N/a	—N/a
2026	31	34	NC	8	—N/a	—N/a	65	—N/a	—N/a	—N/a

==== Individual podiums ====
- 5 victories – (3 WC, 2 SWC)
- 25 podiums – (18 WC, 7 SWC)

No.	Season	Date	Location	Race	Level	Place
1	2017–18	30 December 2017	Lenzerheide, Switzerland	1.5 km Sprint F	Stage World Cup	3rd
2	2017–18	13 January 2018	Dresden, Germany	1.2 km Sprint F	World Cup	3rd
3	2017–18	27 January 2018	Seefeld, Austria	1.4 km Sprint F	World Cup	2nd
4	2017–18	16 March 2018	Falun, Sweden	1.4 km Sprint F	Stage World Cup	3rd
5	2018–19	29 December 2018	Toblach, Italy	1.3 km Sprint F	Stage World Cup	3rd
6	2018–19	16 February 2019	Cogne, Italy	1.6 km Sprint F	World Cup	3rd
7	2019–20	14 December 2019	Davos, Switzerland	1.5 km Sprint F	World Cup	2nd
8	2019–20	21 December 2019	Planica, Slovenia	1.2 km Sprint F	World Cup	1st
9	2019–20	11 January 2020	Dresden, Germany	1.3 km Sprint F	World Cup	1st
10	2021–22	18 December 2021	Dresden, Germany	1.3 km Sprint F	World Cup	3rd
11	2021–22	28 December 2021	Lenzerheide, Switzerland	1.5 km Sprint F	Stage World Cup	3rd
12	2021–22	26 February 2022	Lahti, Finland	1.6 km Sprint F	World Cup	2nd
13	2021–22	3 March 2022	Drammen, Norway	1.2 km Sprint C	World Cup	3rd
14	2021–22	11 March 2022	Falun, Sweden	1.4 km Sprint C	World Cup	3rd
15	2022–23	17 December 2022	Davos, Switzerland	1.5 km Sprint F	World Cup	3rd
16	2022–23	21 March 2023	Tallinn, Estonia	1.4 km Sprint F	World Cup	2nd
17	2023–24	15 December 2023	Trondheim, Norway	1.4 km Sprint F	World Cup	2nd
18	2023–24	30 December 2023	Toblach, Italy	1.4 km Sprint F	Stage World Cup	1st
19	2023–24	3 January 2024	Davos, Switzerland	1.2 km Sprint F	Stage World Cup	1st
20	2023–24	27 January 2024	Goms, Switzerland	1.5 km Sprint F	World Cup	2nd
21	2023–24	3 March 2024	Lahti, Finland	1.5 km Sprint F	World Cup	2nd
22	2024–25	14 December 2024	Davos, Switzerland	1.2 km Sprint F	World Cup	2nd
23	2024–25	28 December 2024	Toblach, Italy	1.4 km Sprint F	Stage World Cup	2nd
24	2024–25	25 January 2025	Engadin, Switzerland	1.3 km Sprint F	World Cup	3rd
25	2025–26	13 December 2025	Davos, Switzerland	1.5 km Sprint F	World Cup	1st

==== Team podiums ====
- 1 victory – (1 TS)
- 3 podiums – (3 TS)

No.	Season	Date	Location	Race	Level	Place	Teammate
1	2016–17	5 February 2017	Pyeongchang, South Korea	6 × 1.5 km Team Sprint F	World Cup	2nd	Gros
2	2019–20	12 January 2020	Dresden, Germany	12 × 0.65 km Team Sprint F	World Cup	1st	Jay
3	2020–21	20 December 2020	Dresden, Germany	12 × 0.65 km Team Sprint F	World Cup	2nd	Jouve
