= Renaud Jay =

French cross-country skier (born 1991)

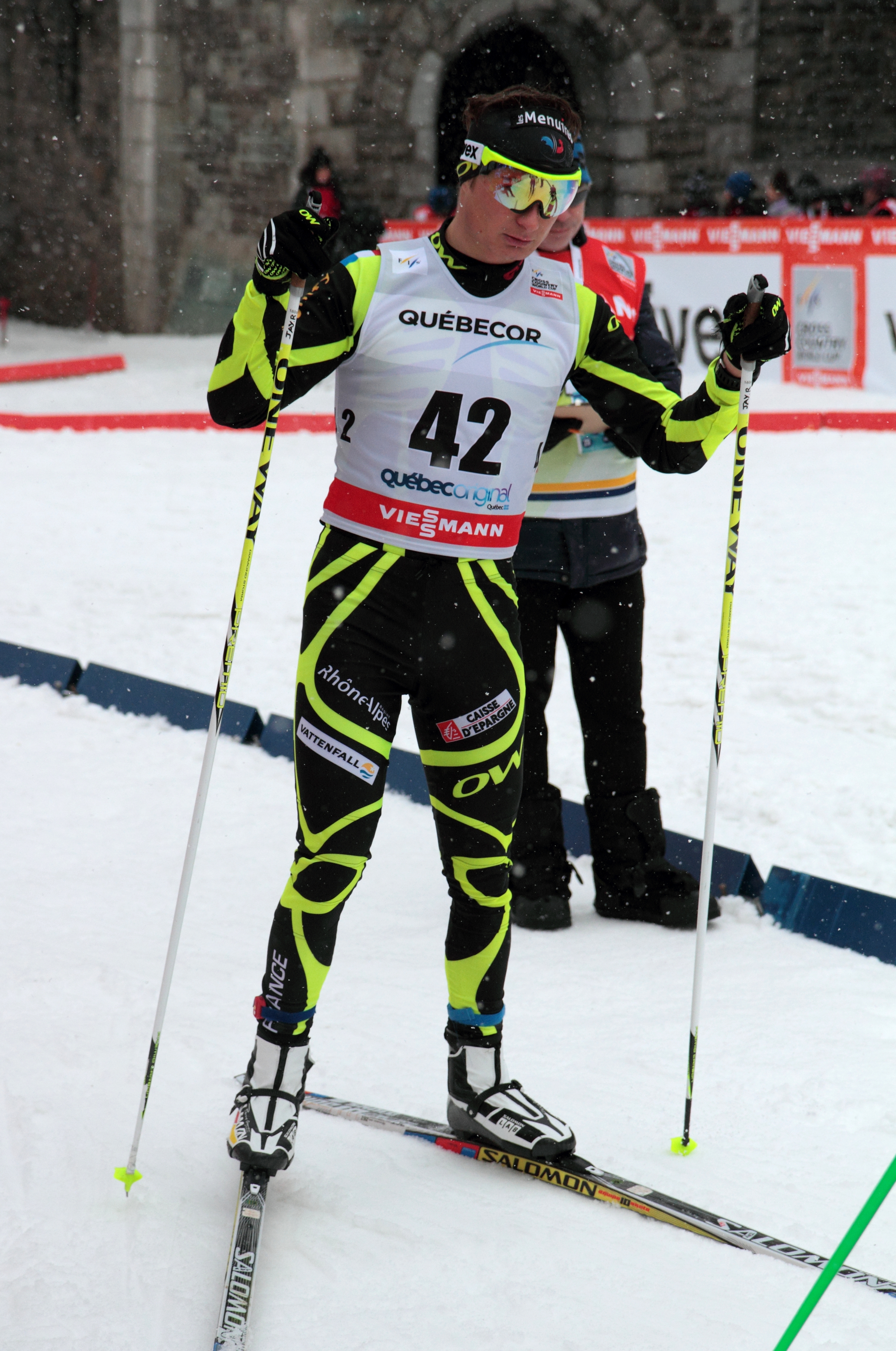
- Jay in 2012

Personal information
- Nationality: France
- Born: 12 August 1991 (age 34) Moûtiers, France
- Height: 1.74 m (5 ft 9 in)

Sport
- Sport: Skiing
- Club: Club des Sports des Menuires

World Cup career
- Seasons: 13 – (2012–present)
- Indiv. starts: 122
- Indiv. podiums: 1
- Indiv. wins: 0
- Team starts: 17
- Team podiums: 3
- Team wins: 2
- Overall titles: 0 – (23rd in 2023)
- Discipline titles: 0
Medal record
Men's cross-country skiing
Representing France
World Championships
Bronze medal – third place	2023 Planica	Team sprint
- Updated on 9 December 2023

Renaud Jay (born 12 August 1991 in Moûtiers) is a French cross-country skier.

== Cross-country skiing results ==
All results are sourced from the International Ski Federation (FIS).

=== Olympic Games ===
Year	Age	15 km individual	30 km skiathlon	50 km mass start	Sprint	4 × 10 km relay	Team sprint
2014	22	—	—	—	14	—	—
2022	30	—	—	—	27	—	—

=== World Championships ===
- 1 medal – (1 bronze)

Year	Age	15 km individual	30 km skiathlon	50 km mass start	Sprint	4 × 10 km relay	Team sprint
2017	25	—	—	—	30	—	—
2019	27	—	—	—	19	—	—
2021	29	—	—	—	32	—	—
2023	31	—	—	—	8	—	Bronze

=== World Cup ===
==== Season standings ====
Season	Age	Discipline standings			Ski Tour standings				
Season	Age	Overall	Distance	Sprint	Nordic Opening	Tour de Ski	Ski Tour 2020	World Cup Final	Ski Tour Canada
2012	20	NC	—	NC	—	—	—N/a	—	—N/a
2013	21	165	—	107	—	—	—N/a	—	—N/a
2014	22	95	—	44	—	—	—N/a	—	—N/a
2015	23	59	NC	21	DNF	DNF	—N/a	—N/a	—N/a
2016	24	40	NC	15	—	DNF	—N/a	—N/a	DNF
2017	25	92	—	41	—	DNF	—N/a	—	—N/a
2018	26	72	NC	31	DNF	—	—N/a	45	—N/a
2019	27	48	NC	22	DNF	DNF	—N/a	50	—N/a
2020	28	42	74	13	—	DNF	DNF	—N/a	—N/a
2021	29	75	NC	34	60	—	—N/a	—N/a	—N/a
2022	30	47	NC	23	—N/a	DNF	—N/a	—N/a	—N/a
2023	31	23	78	9	—N/a	40	—N/a	—N/a	—N/a

==== Individual podiums ====
- 1 podium – (1 SWC)

No.	Season	Date	Location	Race	Level	Place
1	2019–20	18 February 2020	Åre, Sweden	0.7 km Sprint F	Stage World Cup	3rd

==== Team podiums ====
- 2 victories – (2 TS)
- 3 podiums – (3 TS)

No.	Season	Date	Location	Race	Level	Place	Teammate
1	2015–16	17 January 2016	Planica, Slovenia	6 × 1.2 km Team Sprint F	World Cup	2nd	Gros
2	2019–20	12 January 2020	Dresden, Germany	12 × 0.65 km Team Sprint F	World Cup	1st	Chanavat
3	2022–23	22 January 2023	Livigno, Italy	6 × 1.2 km Team Sprint F	World Cup	1st	Jouve
