= 2016 Ski Tour Canada =

Cross-country skiing competition

Ski Tour Canada
2015–16 FIS Cross-Country World Cup
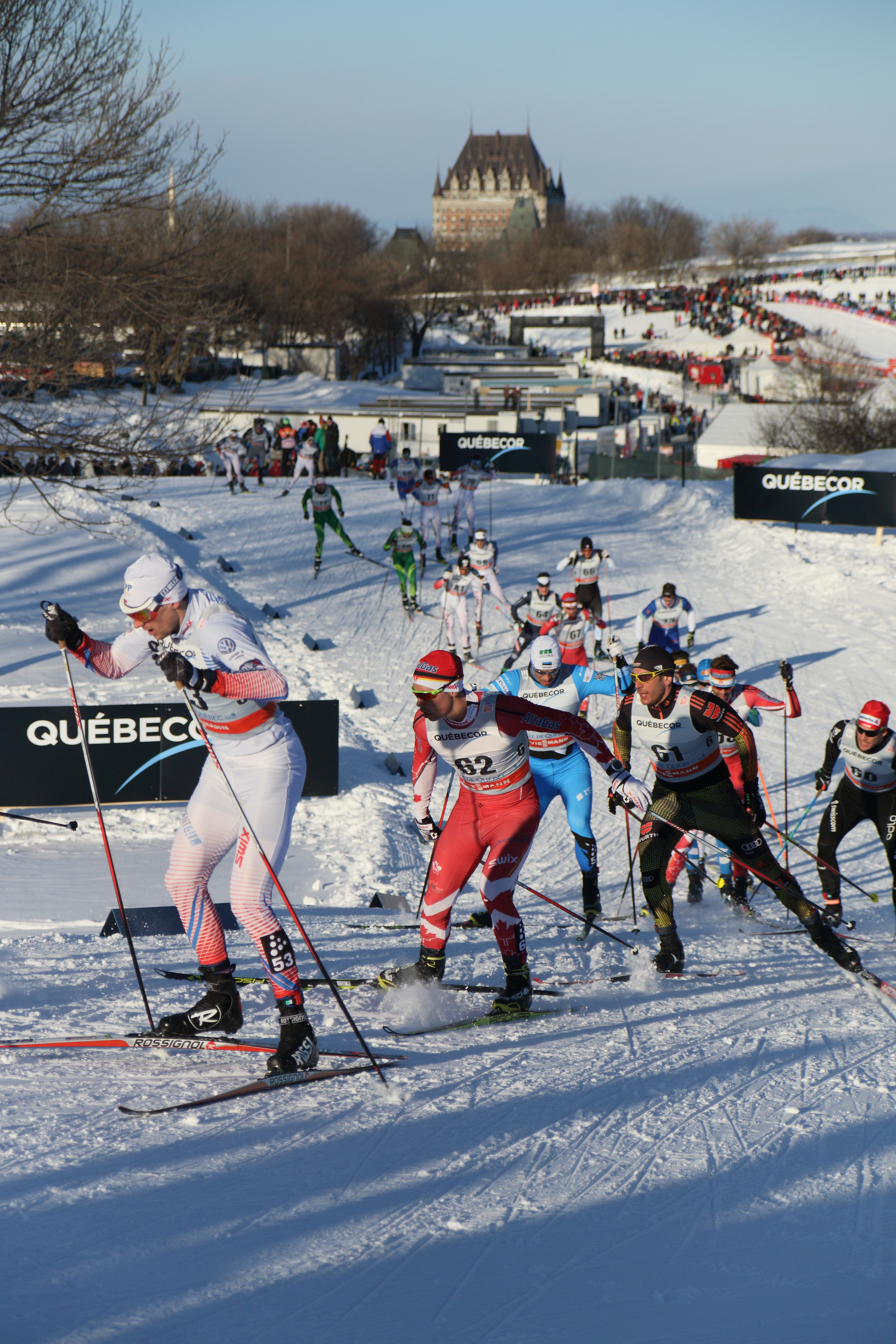
- Men's 15 km pursuit (free technique) in Quebec City

Ski tour details
- Venue(s): Gatineau, Montreal, Quebec City, Canmore, Lake Louise (all Canada)
- Dates: 1 March 2016 – 12 March 2016
- Stages: 8

Results
Men
Jersey awarded to the men's overall winner	Winner	Martin Johnsrud Sundby (NOR)
	Second	Sergey Ustiugov (RUS)
	Third	Petter Northug (NOR)
Women
Jersey awarded to the women's overall winner	Winner	Therese Johaug (NOR)
	Second	Heidi Weng (NOR)
	Third	Ingvild Flugstad Østberg (NOR)

The 2016 Ski Tour Canada was a cross-country skiing competition held as part of the 2015–16 FIS Cross-Country World Cup. It was the first tour of the FIS Cross-Country World Cup held in Canada. It began in Gatineau on March 1, 2016, and ended in Canmore on March 12, 2016. It consisted of eight stages, the first four held in Quebec, the remainder being held in Alberta.

The competitors received half of the usual World Cup points for the individual stages at this event. For the overall standings they received four times the World Cup points compared to a regular individual World Cup event.

== Standings ==
=== Men ===
Final standings after stage 8, with bonus seconds deducted

Place	Name	Time
1	Martin Johnsrud Sundby (NOR)	4:06:35.2
2	Sergey Ustiugov (RUS)	+57.7
3	Petter Northug (NOR)	+1:52.5
4	Maurice Manificat (FRA)	+2:18.4
5	Alex Harvey (CAN)	+2:53.9
6	Matti Heikkinen (FIN)	+3:06.8
7	Emil Iversen (NOR)	+4:12.7
8	Hans Christer Holund (NOR)	+5:14.3
9	Finn Hågen Krogh (NOR)	+5:23.7
10	Marcus Hellner (SWE)	+6:01.3

=== Women ===
Final standings after stage 8, with bonus seconds deducted

Place	Name	Time
1	Therese Johaug (NOR)	2:40:52.0
2	Heidi Weng (NOR)	+1:07.8
3	Ingvild Flugstad Østberg (NOR)	+2:13.3
4	Krista Pärmäkoski (FIN)	+2:56.2
5	Jessie Diggins (USA)	+3:08.5
6	Astrid Uhrenholdt Jacobsen (NOR)	+4:12.0
7	Kerttu Niskanen (FIN)	+5:20.5
8	Anne Kyllönen (FIN)	+5:34.8
9	Justyna Kowalczyk (POL)	+6:55.7
10	Maiken Caspersen Falla (NOR)	+7:07.8

== Stages ==
=== Stage 1 ===
1 March 2016 Jacques Cartier Park (Gatineau), Canada

Men - 1.7 km Sprint Freestyle
Place	Name	Time
1	Sergey Ustiugov (RUS)	3:09.36
2	Richard Jouve (FRA)	+0.08
3	Simi Hamilton (USA)	+0.09
4	Finn Hågen Krogh (NOR)	+0.13
5	Ola Vigen Hattestad (NOR)	+0.71
6	Petter Northug (NOR)	+0.72

Women - 1.7 km Sprint Freestyle
Place	Name	Time
1	Maiken Caspersen Falla (NOR)	3:34.0
2	Stina Nilsson (SWE)	+0.73
3	Jessie Diggins (USA)	+0.87
4	Heidi Weng (NOR)	+1.20
5	Ingvild Flugstad Østberg (NOR)	+1.30
6	Ida Ingemarsdotter (SWE)	+1.60

=== Stage 2 ===
2 March 2016, Mount Royal (Montreal), Canada

Men - 17.5 km Classical (mass start)
Place	Name	Time
1	Emil Iversen (NOR)	45:05.4
2	Petter Northug (NOR)	+5.3
3	Sergey Ustiugov (RUS)	+14.5
4	Martin Johnsrud Sundby (NOR)	+39.8
5	Maxim Vylegzhanin (RUS)	+51.4

Women - 10.5 km Classical (mass start)
Place	Name	Time
1	Therese Johaug (NOR)	30:05.6
2	Heidi Weng (NOR)	+1:00.3
3	Astrid Uhrenholdt Jacobsen (NOR)	+1:09.8
4	Maiken Caspersen Falla (NOR)	+1:42.0
5	Justyna Kowalczyk (POL)	+1:42.8

=== Stage 3 ===
4 March 2016, Plains of Abraham (Quebec City), Canada

Men - 1.7 km Sprint Freestyle
Place	Name	Time
1	Baptiste Gros (FRA)	3:36.26
2	Alex Harvey (CAN)	+0.55
3	Sergey Ustiugov (RUS)	+0.79
4	Petter Northug (NOR)	+1.91
5	Maciej Staręga (POL)	+2.12
6	Richard Jouve (FRA)	+2.18

Women - 1.5 km Sprint Freestyle
Place	Name	Time
1	Stina Nilsson (SWE)	3:37.15
2	Maiken Caspersen Falla (NOR)	+0.11
3	Heidi Weng (NOR)	+0.56
4	Ingvild Flugstad Østberg (NOR)	+1.09
5	Astrid Uhrenholdt Jacobsen (NOR)	+1.57
6	Ida Ingemarsdotter (SWE)	+9.43

=== Stage 4 ===
5 March 2016, Plains of Abraham (Quebec City), Canada

Men - 15 km Freestyle (pursuit)
Place	Name	Time
1	Sergey Ustiugov (RUS)	34:31.8
2	Petter Northug (NOR)	+17.7
3	Emil Iversen (NOR)	+1:02.2
4	Alex Harvey (CAN)	+1:49.8
5	Martin Johnsrud Sundby (NOR)	+1:50.8

Women - 10 km Freestyle (pursuit)
Place	Name	Time
1	Heidi Weng (NOR)	24:18.8
2	Therese Johaug (NOR)	+0.1
3	Astrid Uhrenholdt Jacobsen (NOR)	+1:05.2
4	Maiken Caspersen Falla (NOR)	+1:37.6
5	Jessie Diggins (USA)	+1:48.1

=== Stage 5 ===
8 March 2016, Canmore Nordic Centre Provincial Park, (Canmore), Canada

Men - 1.5 km Sprint Classical
Place	Name	Time
1	Federico Pellegrino (ITA)	3:46.33
2	Eirik Brandsdal (NOR)	+0.54
3	Maurice Manificat (FRA)	+1.00
4	Martin Johnsrud Sundby (NOR)	+2.21
5	Finn Hågen Krogh (NOR)	+32.79
6	Petter Northug (NOR)	+2:15.14

Women - 1.5 km Sprint Classical
Place	Name	Time
1	Maiken Caspersen Falla (NOR)	4:09.26
2	Astrid Uhrenholdt Jacobsen (NOR)	+7.07
3	Ingvild Flugstad Østberg (NOR)	+8.66
4	Krista Pärmäkoski (FIN)	+18.03
5	Anne Kyllönen (FIN)	+19.07
6	Jessie Diggins (USA)	+21.96

=== Stage 6 ===
9 March 2016, Canmore Nordic Centre Provincial Park, (Canmore), Canada

Men - 30 km Skiathlon
Place	Name	Time
1	Martin Johnsrud Sundby (NOR)	1:16:29.7
2	Sergey Ustiugov (RUS)	+2.8
3	Matti Heikkinen (FIN)	+3.7
4	Finn Hågen Krogh (NOR)	+5.0
5	Didrik Tønseth (NOR)	+7.1

Women - 15 km Skiathlon
Place	Name	Time
1	Heidi Weng (NOR)	39:41.0
2	Therese Johaug (NOR)	+0.8
3	Astrid Uhrenholdt Jacobsen (NOR)	+9.8
4	Krista Pärmäkoski (FIN)	+13.4
5	Anne Kyllönen (FIN)	+13.5

=== Stage 7 ===
11 March 2016, Canmore Nordic Centre Provincial Park, (Canmore), Canada

Men - 20 km Freestyle (individual)
Place	Name	Time
1	Matti Heikkinen (FIN)	35:16.3
2	Evgeniy Belov (RUS)	+13.6
3	Marcus Hellner (SWE)	+13.9
4	Alex Harvey (CAN)	+21.7
5	Robin Duvillard (FRA)	+28.8

Women - 10 km Freestyle (individual)
Place	Name	Time
1	Ingvild Flugstad Østberg (NOR)	23:20.1
2	Heidi Weng (NOR)	+23.0
3	Krista Pärmäkoski (FIN)	+24.5
4	Kari Øyre Slind (NOR)	+24.6
5	Jessie Diggins (USA)	+32.6

=== Stage 8 ===
12 March 2016, Canmore Nordic Centre Provincial Park, (Canmore), Canada

Men - 15 km Classical (pursuit)
Place	Name	Time
1	Martin Johnsrud Sundby (NOR)	47:24.1
2	Sergey Ustiugov (RUS)	+57.7
3	Petter Northug (NOR)	+1:52.5
4	Maurice Manificat (FRA)	+2:18.4
5	Alex Harvey (CAN)	+2:53.9

Women - 10 km Classical (pursuit)
Place	Name	Time
1	Therese Johaug (NOR)	34:12.4
2	Heidi Weng (NOR)	+1:07.8
3	Ingvild Flugstad Østberg (NOR)	+2:13.3
4	Krista Pärmäkoski (FIN)	+2:56.2
5	Jessie Diggins (USA)	+3:08.5
