= Sondre Turvoll Fossli =

Norwegian cross-country skier (born 1993)

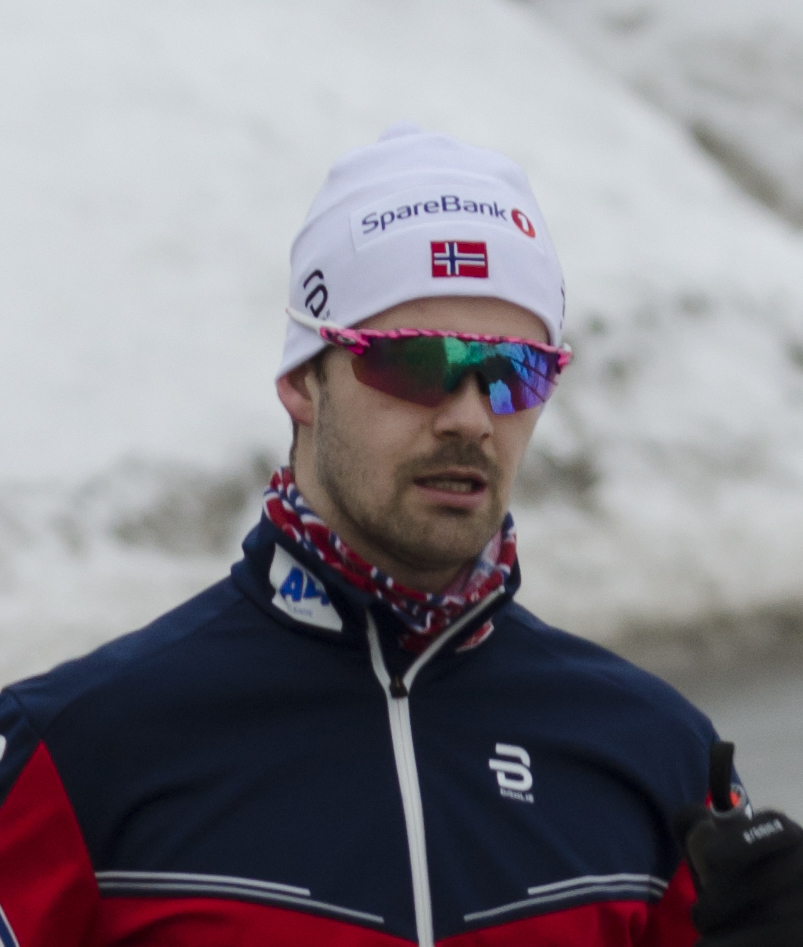
- Sondre Turvoll Fossli, Drammen, 2018

Personal information
- Nationality: Norwegian
- Born: 10 August 1993 (age 32) Hokksund, Norway

Sport
- Sport: Skiing
- Club: Hokksund IL

World Cup career
- Seasons: 9 – (2011–2019)
- Indiv. starts: 46
- Indiv. podiums: 4
- Indiv. wins: 1
- Team starts: 1
- Team podiums: 0
- Overall titles: 0 – (27th in 2015)
- Discipline titles: 0
Medal record
Men's cross-country skiing
Representing Norway
U23 World Championships
Gold medal – first place	2015 Almaty	Individual sprint
Junior World Championships
Silver medal – second place	2011 Otepää	Individual sprint
Bronze medal – third place	2012 Erzurum	4 × 5 km relay
Bronze medal – third place	2012 Erzurum	Individual sprint
- Updated on 6 January 2020

Sondre Turvoll Fossli (born 10 August 1993) is a Norwegian cross-country skier who competed between 2010 and 2019. He won his only World Cup race in the individual classic sprint event in Rukatunturi on 27 November 2015.

On 12 August 2019, Fossli suffered sudden cardiac arrest while out on a car ride with his girlfriend in Oslo. Paramedics were able to get his heart beating again by using a defibrillator and he was subsequently hospitalized at Oslo University Hospital. He spent ten days at the hospital, but the physicians were not able to find the cause why his heart stopped beating. In December 2019, he underwent an operation, and was fitted with a implantable cardioverter-defibrillator.

As a result of the cardiac arrest, he announced his retirement from cross-country skiing in April 2020.

== Cross-country skiing results ==
All results are sourced from the International Ski Federation (FIS).

=== World Cup ===
==== Season standings ====
Season	Age	Discipline standings			Ski Tour standings			
Season	Age	Overall	Distance	Sprint	Nordic Opening	Tour de Ski	World Cup Final	Ski Tour Canada
2011	17	154	—	96	—	—	—	—N/a
2012	18	NC	—	NC	—	—	—	—N/a
2013	19	96	—	49	—	—	—	—N/a
2014	20	70	—	30	—	—	—	—N/a
2015	21	27	—	5	—	—	—N/a	—N/a
2016	22	29	NC	8	DNF	DNF	—N/a	—
2017	23	40	NC	15	DNF	—	—	—N/a
2018	24	41	—	14	DNF	—	—	—N/a
2019	25	35	NC	10	72	—	—	—N/a

==== Individual podiums ====
- 1 victory – (1 SWC)
- 4 podiums – (3 WC, 1 SWC)

No.	Season	Date	Location	Race	Level	Place
1	2014–15	29 November 2014	Rukatunturi, Finland	1.4 km Sprint C	World Cup	3rd
2	2015–16	27 November 2015	Rukatunturi, Finland	1.4 km Sprint C	Stage World Cup	1st
3	2015–16	13 December 2015	Davos, Switzerland	1.6 km Sprint F	World Cup	3rd
4	2016–17	3 February 2017	Pyeongchang, South Korea	1.5 km Sprint C	World Cup	2nd
