= Petter Northug =

Norwegian cross-country skier

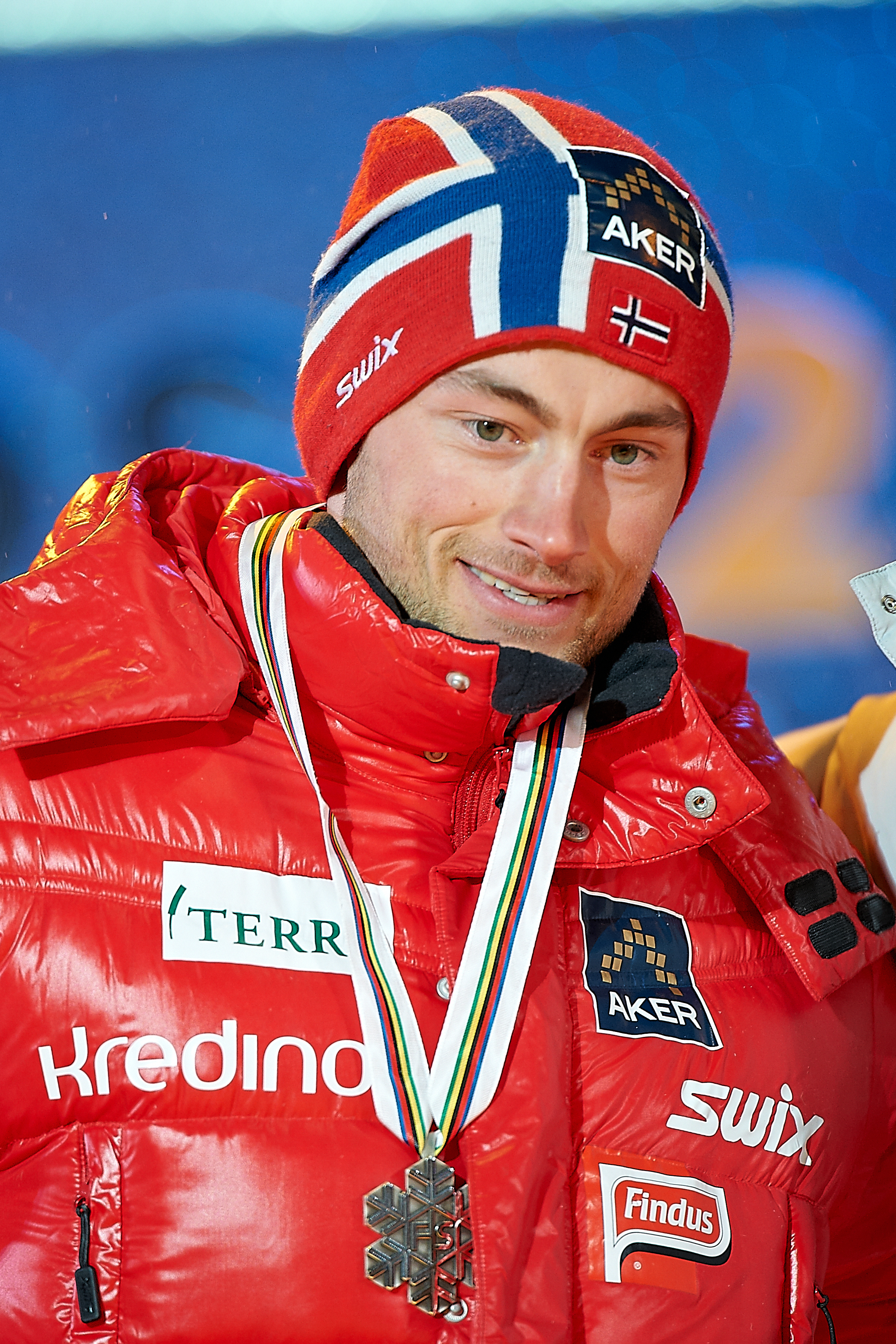
- Petter Northug during the FIS Nordic Skiing World Championships in Oslo, Norway in February 2011

Personal information
- Full name: Petter Northug Jr.
- Nationality: Norway
- Born: 6 January 1986 (age 40) Framverran, Mosvik Municipality, Norway
- Height: 1.85 m (6 ft 1 in)

Sport
- Sport: Skiing
- Club: Strindheim IL

World Cup career
- Seasons: 14 – (2005–2018)
- Indiv. starts: 219
- Indiv. podiums: 84
- Indiv. wins: 38
- Team starts: 16
- Team podiums: 12
- Team wins: 9
- Overall titles: 2 – (2010, 2013)
- Discipline titles: 1 – (1 DI: 2010)
Medal record
Representing Norway
Event	1st	2nd	3rd
Olympic Games	2	1	1
World Championships	13	3	0
Total	15	4	1
Men's cross-country skier
Olympic Games
Gold medal – first place	2010 Vancouver	50 km classical
Gold medal – first place	2010 Vancouver	Team sprint
Silver medal – second place	2010 Vancouver	4 × 10 km relay
Bronze medal – third place	2010 Vancouver	Individual sprint
World Championships
Gold medal – first place	2007 Sapporo	4 × 10 km relay
Gold medal – first place	2009 Liberec	30 km skiathlon
Gold medal – first place	2009 Liberec	50 km freestyle
Gold medal – first place	2009 Liberec	4 × 10 km relay
Gold medal – first place	2011 Oslo	30 km skiathlon
Gold medal – first place	2011 Oslo	50 km freestyle
Gold medal – first place	2011 Oslo	4 × 10 km relay
Gold medal – first place	2013 Val di Fiemme	15 km freestyle
Gold medal – first place	2013 Val di Fiemme	4 × 10 km relay
Gold medal – first place	2015 Falun	Individual sprint
Gold medal – first place	2015 Falun	50 km classical
Gold medal – first place	2015 Falun	Team sprint
Gold medal – first place	2015 Falun	4 × 10 km relay
Silver medal – second place	2011 Oslo	Individual sprint
Silver medal – second place	2011 Oslo	Team sprint
Silver medal – second place	2013 Val di Fiemme	Individual sprint
Junior World Championships
Gold medal – first place	2005 Rovaniemi	20 km skiathlon
Gold medal – first place	2005 Rovaniemi	10 km freestyle
Gold medal – first place	2006 Kranj	Individual sprint
Gold medal – first place	2006 Kranj	10 km classical
Gold medal – first place	2006 Kranj	20 km skiathlon
Gold medal – first place	2006 Kranj	4 × 10 km relay
Silver medal – second place	2005 Rovaniemi	Individual sprint
Silver medal – second place	2005 Rovaniemi	4 × 10 km relay

Petter Northug Jr. (born 6 January 1986) is a Norwegian former cross-country skier and double Olympic champion. He won a total of 13 World Championship and two Winter Olympic gold medals with 20 medals overall (two gold, one silver and one bronze at the Olympics, 13 gold and three silver at the World Ski Championships), and 18 individual FIS Cross-Country World Cup wins with 13 podium places. He is also the record holder for most stage wins (13) in Tour de Ski. By winning his ninth gold medal in the Nordic World Ski Championships in 4 × 10 km relay in Val di Fiemme 2013, he leveled the achievement of Bjørn Dæhlie who had been the most successful World Champion male skier up to that point. He is considered by many as the greatest cross-country skier of all time.

He is expected to work as a commentator of skiing, on channel TV 2 during the winter of 2021/2022.

== Early life and career ==
During his early years, Northug was generally considered a star of the future. Whilst he was still a junior, Verdens Gang newspaper reported in November 2005 that "the ski manufacturers are fighting to get Northug". Fischer won his signature, and his contract included a base salary (the first time ever for a junior), which would be multiplied by five if he made the Norwegian elite team for 2006/07, a goal he achieved. The contract also offered bonuses if he won medals in the junior World Championships.

Northug has six gold medals from junior World Championships. His first two gold medals came in 2004/05 in the pursuit and the 10 km freestyle in Rovaniemi, then in 2005/06 in Kranj he won gold in the 10 km classic, the pursuit, the sprint, and the relay. He also has two silver medals (one in the sprint, and one in the relay, both in 2004/05). His victories made him the first athlete ever to win five individual gold medals at the FIS Junior Nordic World Ski Championships. During 2005/06 he also took part in the Norwegian National Championships, and won the double pursuit race, beating his compatriot Frode Estil by 1.9 seconds, and becoming the first junior to ever win a Norwegian National Championship.

Before he joined the World Cup he competed in a few Continental Cup meetings, but mostly in the Scandinavian Cup. During his Scandinavian Cup career (2004/05 & 2005/06) he had seven podium finishes, he came second once in 2004/05, and in 2005/06 he scored four victories, and two second places.

== Skiing career ==
The 2005/06 season was Northug's first in the World Cup, although he competed in one race the season before, a sprint in Drammen, he came 35th. During the 2005/06 season he shared his time equally between the World Cup and the Scandinavian Cup, although in early May 2006 it was announced that Northug would be in the senior national team for the 2006/07 season. Northug also claimed his first World Cup victory in the 2005/06 season, in a pursuit race in Falun, beating 2005/06 World Cup winner Tobias Angerer, who came second, and 2004/05 overall champion Axel Teichmann was third. Then in the last race of the year, a pursuit in Sapporo he claimed another podium place, coming second. He lost to Mathias Fredriksson by 3.8 seconds. He also came seventh, tenth, and twelfth in sprint races, and fifteenth in the 50 km freestyle in Holmenkollen. Northug finished the 2005/06 World Cup season in 14th place overall. He also finished 14th in the distance standings, and 24th in the sprint.

After Norway's disappointing display at the 2006 Winter Olympics, the Norwegian press questioned why Northug was not taken to the Games. Northug himself admitted he was disappointed after not getting selected, especially as he had won the double pursuit in the National Championships earlier in the year. The day after the 2006 Olympics Team was announced, Northug was on the team winning the Norwegian Championships in 3x10 kilometer relay. As he crossed the finish line, he shouted "And I am not going to the Olympics?".

Northug won his first gold medal at the FIS Nordic World Ski Championships in Sapporo as a member of the 4 x 10 km relay in 2007. Northug completed the last leg of the relay, beating Sweden and Russia on the sprint for the finish line. He was also in a good position to compete for the silver in the 30 kilometer duathlon, but he fell in the last part of the race and was disappointed to finish fifth.

He was far more successful at the FIS Nordic World Ski Championships 2009 in Liberec, where he earned three golds in the 15 km + 15 km double pursuit, 4 x 10 km relay and 50 km freestyle mass start. In all three events he sprinted away from the rest of the pack to win the race.

Northug was the runner up to the overall World Cup in the 2008/2009 season, losing to the Swiss Dario Cologna after leading before the final races.

Northug finished in an extremely disappointing 41st place in the first Cross Country event during the 2010 Winter Olympics in Vancouver, British Columbia, Canada. A day later, Northug responded with a bronze medal in the Sprint Event. This success was short-lived however, as he broke his pole in the end of the 30 km pursuit, where he was one of the biggest favourites to win. He then won his first Olympic gold, in the Team Sprint, alongside Øystein Pettersen.

Days later he was skiing the anchor leg in the 4 x 10 km relay. When he took over from Lars Berger who was skiing the 3rd leg, he was 37.5 seconds behind the lead group. Despite this he managed to catch and overtake France and the Czech Republic to win Norway a silver medal. Northug then won his first individual medal at the Olympics when he won gold at the Men's 50 kilometre classic. Less than two weeks later, he won the 50 kilometre freestyle event at the Holmenkollen, becoming the first skier to win the 50 km at the Winter Olympics, World Championships, and Holmenkollen since Sweden's Gunde Svan reached that triple crown in 1988.

In September 2010 details of Northug's sponsorship contract with soft drink manufacturer Red Bull were publicized by Norwegian broadcaster TV 2, which did not divulge its sources, revealing the most profitable sponsorship agreement with an individual athlete in Norwegian history. For four years, until after the 2014 Winter Olympics, Northug was slated to receive a minimum of NOK 1 million annually with a prospect of getting twice that amount if his performances equalled those of his recent previous seasons.

Northug did not start the 2010–2011 season well, missing the first three weeks of the World Cup due to illness. His Tour de Ski campaign was also marred by relatively poor results in the opening stages. However, he climbed the rankings and finished 2nd after winning the prestigious penultimate stage (20 km classic mass start) in Val di Fiemme. In doing so, he also took all the intermediate bonus sprints, which had never previously been done by the winner of the race. In the Holmenkollen World Ski Championship Northug raced in five disciplines, taking 3 gold and 2 silver medals. During the 2011 World Championship, he gained widespread international attention when he controversially crossed the finish-line sideways after decisively beating his opponents on the last leg of the 4x10 kilometre relay. The gesture was regarded by media as disrespectful, most notably towards his most fierce rival, Marcus Hellner. At the end of the season Northug also won the Season Finale in Sweden, beating his compatriot Finn Haagen Krogh.

In the FIS Nordic World Ski Championships 2013, Northug won the 15 km freestyle for the first time at a World Championships, completing his collection of World Championship gold medals. He again beat the Swedes on the sprint of the 4x10 km relay, securing Norway's 7th World Championship gold medal in a row in the relay. Northug also won a silver in the individual sprint. He was less successful on the team sprint, where he and his teammate, Pål Golberg, went out in the semifinal. Despite being a favorite before the 50 km, Northug finished 21st. He gave the winner, Johan Olsson, his jersey after the race as a gesture of respect.

Northug had an impressive ending to the 2012–13 season. He won the 15 km individual classic in Lahti by over half a minute before being victorious in the famous classic sprint in Drammen. In the Season Finale in Sweden, Northug won first two stages, the prestigious classic sprint in Stockholm and freestyle prologue in Falun, then finished fourth in the penultimate stage, 15k classic mass start, and closed the season by winning the whole mini-tour. Before Lahti, Northug was in the third place in the World Cup, 226 points behind the lead; by the time it finished, he stood in first, 180 points ahead of second place.

The 2013-14 season saw Northug struggle with an illness which severely impacted his performance. Particularly frustrating for him was his inability to fight for medals in the skiathlon and individual sprint of the Sochi Olympics. His relatively lackluster performance in the 50 km event, which saw him finish a distant 18th in a race he had definitively won four years earlier, meant he left a major world event without a single medal for the first time in eight years.

Northug looked to be in better physical shape in the 2014/2015 season, and proved to be Sundby's strongest competition during that season's Tour de Ski. Despite leading before the final climb up the Alpe Cermis, he lost to Sundby, who won his second TdS title in a row. In July 2016, Sundby lost that title to Northug after Sundby's anti-doping rule violation, thereby giving Northug his first Tour de Ski win.

At the 2015 World Championships in Falun, Northug secured his 10th WC gold medal by narrowly beating Canada's Alex Harvey in a bunch sprint to the finish line in the men's classic sprint event. He then proceeded to contribute to Norway's victory in both the team sprint and 4x10km relay. The final race of these World Championships, i.e. the 50 km classic, saw Northug notch a notable victory. The race was held in difficult conditions due to heavy snowfall; sitting at third in the last climb before the finish, Northug, in a remarkable display of double poling, managed to overtake his remaining two opponents to win the race. As of 2015, Northug had won 20 Olympic and World Championship medals (15 gold, 4 silver, 1 bronze).

He announced his retirement from cross-country skiing on 12 December 2018.

== Career after competitive skiing ==
As late as 13 August 2020 he was doing occasional work as a celebrity at summer camp for teenage skiers.

In August 2020 Uno-X said that their sponsorship deal with Northug would be canceled in the near future, due to [the company's view that] Northug "must concentrate about other things".

In November 2020 he released a Christmas song, "Petters Jul".

== Personal life ==
He has two brothers, Even and Tomas. Tomas Northug also skis professionally and won the Junior World Championships in sprint in 2010. Northug finished school in 2006, but during the summer of 2005 he changed schools from Steinkjer Municipality to Meråker Municipality and moved into a cabin next to the ski trails to optimize his training conditions.

Northug is an active poker player, and has openly supported the legalization of poker in Norway, which is currently illegal when prizes are involved under Norwegian gambling laws. He participated and cashed (on 653rd place) in the 2010 World Series of Poker main event which he played with skiing rival Marcus Hellner.

Northug is featured in the music video "Rise Again" by Jack Taylor, featuring Mo of Norway.

=== Substance abuse and traffic violations ===
In the early hours of 4 May 2014, Northug crashed his car, an Audi A7, near his home in Byåsen, Trondheim, while driving under the influence (DUI) of alcohol. At the time, it was suspected that the car was driving well over the speed limit, which was 40 km/h (25 mph) at the site of the crash. A 23-year-old male passenger broke his collar bone in the crash. After the crash, Northug fled the scene, but was located at his nearby residence by the police using search dogs. In a press release made later the day of the crash, Northug apologised for the incident.

On 15 September 2014, Northug was charged by the Norwegian public prosecutor with five counts of violation of the Norwegian Road Traffic Act and one count of violation of the general civil penal code. The latter charge stemmed from Northug having claimed, in three separate police interrogations on the day of the crash, that his passenger had actually been driving the vehicle at the time of the accident. Due to Northug's initial claims, the passenger had been preliminarily charged with causing the incident.

Because Northug pleaded guilty to all the charges leveled against him, he received a summary trial, which took place on 9 October 2014 at the Sør-Trøndelag District Court in Trondheim. Northug was sentenced to 50 days of prison, ten days less than requested by the prosecutor. He had already served two days of the sentence in police custody after his initial arrest. In addition to the prison time, Northug was fined 185,000 kr and lost his driver's license [indefinitely, or at least] for five years. The prison sentence was served, while wearing an ankle monitor, in his home.

As a result of the crash, Audi decided not to renew their sponsorship agreement with Northug. Audi had been a sponsor of Northug since June 2011.

==== 2020 ====
On 13 August 2020, in Ullensaker, Northug was caught going 168 km/h (104 mph) on a 110 km/h (68 mph) road in his Jaguar F-Type SVR. Police did not confiscate the 40,000 Norwegian kroner found in Northug's car, however police proceeded to search his home and found around 10 grams of substance containing cocaine.

A later indictment in 2020 charged him with reckless driving at high speed, illegal possession (in his home) of 6 grams cocaine, 0.6 grams of MDMA, three tablets containing Diazepam and two tablets containing Alprazolam; and [holding or] using a mobile phone while driving. He pleaded guilty (before trial) on all counts; in a summary trial on 21 December 2020 he testified via videolink, at Oslo District Court, he was sentenced to seven months in prison and his driving license was revoked [indefinitely, or] at least for five years. The proceedings in court, revealed that Northug had been driving over 200 km/h on several occasions—two of them in an 80 km/h zone. The verdict said that while he was speeding, he made four video recordings—over several days— for a total of 12 minutes, while commenting about his own driving, as if the drivers being passed were being humiliated and put in their place."

As of June 2021, he was enrolled [as a client] at a clinic that deals with drug dependency; there he was serving his seven-month prison sentence, according to media. During the summer of 2021, he was released.

In 2025, he got his driving privileges back; he passed the practical driving test.

== Cross-country skiing results ==
All results are sourced from the International Ski Federation (FIS).

=== Olympic Games ===
- 4 medals – (2 gold, 1 silver, 1 bronze)

Year	Age	15 km individual	30 km skiathlon	50 km mass start	Sprint	4 × 10 km relay	Team sprint
2010	24	41	11	Gold	Bronze	Silver	Gold
2014	28	—	16	18	10	4	4

=== World Championships ===
- 16 medals – (13 gold, 3 silver)

Year	Age	15 km individual	30 km skiathlon	50 km mass start	Sprint	4 × 10 km relay	Team sprint
2007	21	24	5	—	—	Gold	7
2009	23	29	Gold	Gold	—	Gold	—
2011	25	—	Gold	Gold	Silver	Gold	Silver
2013	27	Gold	4	21	Silver	Gold	11
2015	29	62	11	Gold	Gold	Gold	Gold
2017	31	—	—	8	5	—	—

=== World Cup ===
==== Season titles ====
- 3 titles – (2 overall, 1 distance)

Season	Discipline
2010	Overall
2010	Distance
2013	Overall

Season	Age	Discipline standings			Ski Tour standings			
Season	Age	Overall	Distance	Sprint	Nordic Opening	Tour de Ski	World Cup Final	Ski Tour Canada
2005	19	NC	—	NC	—N/a	—N/a	—N/a	—N/a
2006	20	14	14	24	—N/a	—N/a	—N/a	—N/a
2007	21	7	24	18	—N/a	4	—N/a	—N/a
2008	22	12	24	14	—N/a	8	6	—N/a
2009	23	2nd place, silver medalist(s)	3rd place, bronze medalist(s)	5	—N/a	2nd place, silver medalist(s)	4	—N/a
2010	24	1st place, gold medalist(s)	1st place, gold medalist(s)	2nd place, silver medalist(s)	—N/a	2nd place, silver medalist(s)	1st place, gold medalist(s)	—N/a
2011	25	2nd place, silver medalist(s)	4	7	—	2nd place, silver medalist(s)	1st place, gold medalist(s)	—N/a
2012	26	3rd place, bronze medalist(s)	5	21	1st place, gold medalist(s)	3rd place, bronze medalist(s)	—	—N/a
2013	27	1st place, gold medalist(s)	3rd place, bronze medalist(s)	2nd place, silver medalist(s)	1st place, gold medalist(s)	4	1st place, gold medalist(s)	—N/a
2014	28	6	9	25	13	3rd place, bronze medalist(s)	—	—N/a
2015	29	2nd place, silver medalist(s)	5	8	15	1st place, gold medalist(s)	—N/a	—N/a
2016	30	2nd place, silver medalist(s)	8	2nd place, silver medalist(s)	2nd place, silver medalist(s)	4	—N/a	3rd place, bronze medalist(s)
2017	31	65	118	27	DNF	—	—	—N/a
2018	32	NC	—	NC	—	—	—	—N/a

==== Individual podiums ====
- 38 victories – (20 WC, 18 SWC)
- 84 podiums – (40 WC, 44 SWC)

No.	Season	Date	Location	Race	Level	Place
1	2005–06	8 March 2006	Falun, Sweden	10 km + 10 km Pursuit C/F	World Cup	1st
2	2005–06	19 March 2006	Sapporo, Japan	15 km + 15 km Pursuit C/F	World Cup	2nd
3	2006–07	5 January 2007	Asiago, Italy	1.2 km Sprint F	Stage World Cup	3rd
4	2006–07	10 March 2007	Lahti, Finland	1.4 km Sprint F	World Cup	1st
5	2007–08	4 January 2008	Asiago, Italy	1.2 km Sprint F	Stage World Cup	1st
6	2008–09	22 November 2008	Gällivare, Sweden	15 km Individual F	World Cup	3rd
7	2008–09	6 December 2008	La Clusaz, France	30 km Mass Start F	World Cup	1st
8	2008–09	27 December 2008	Oberhof, Germany	3.75 km Individual F	Stage World Cup	3rd
9	2008–09	1 January 2009	Nové Město, Czech Republic	1.2 km Sprint F	Stage World Cup	1st
10	2008–09	27 December 2008 – 4 January 2009	(Germany) (Czech Republic) (Italy) Tour de Ski	Overall Standings	World Cup	2nd
11	2008–09	7 March 2009	Lahti, Finland	1.55 km Sprint F	World Cup	1st
12	2008–09	12 March 2009	Trondheim, Norway	1.6 km Sprint C	World Cup	2nd
13	2009–10	12 March 2009	Davos, Switzerland	1.7 km Sprint F	World Cup	2nd
14	2009–10	29 November 2009	Rukatunturi, Finland	15 km Individual C	World Cup	1st
15	2009–10	19 December 2009	Rogla, Slovenia	1.5 km Sprint C	World Cup	1st
16	2009–10	20 December 2009	Rogla, Slovenia	30 km Mass Start C	World Cup	1st
17	2009–10	1 January 2010	Oberhof, Germany	3.75 km Individual F	Stage World Cup	1st
18	2009–10	2 January 2010	Oberhof, Germany	15 km Pursuit C	Stage World Cup	1st
19	2009–10	3 January 2010	Oberhof, Germany	1.6 km Sprint C	Stage World Cup	2nd
20	2009–10	6 January 2010	Cortina-Toblach, Italy	35 km Pursuit F	Stage World Cup	1st
21	2009–10	7 January 2010	Toblach, Italy	10 km Individual C	Stage World Cup	3rd
22	2009–10	9 January 2010	Val di Fiemme, Italy	20 km Mass Start C	Stage World Cup	2nd
23	2009–10	1–10 January 2010	(Germany) (Czech Republic) (Italy) Tour de Ski	Overall Standings	World Cup	2nd
24	2009–10	11 March 2010	Drammen, Norway	1.2 km Sprint C	World Cup	2nd
25	2009–10	13 March 2010	Oslo, Norway	50 km Mass Start F	World Cup	1st
26	2009–10	17 March 2010	Stockholm, Sweden	1.0 km Sprint C	Stage World Cup	2nd
27	2009–10	20 March 2010	Falun, Sweden	10 km + 10 km Pursuit C/F	Stage World Cup	1st
28	2009–10	17–21 March 2010	(Sweden) World Cup Final	Overall Standings	World Cup	1st
29	2010–11	18 December 2010	La Clusaz, France	30 km Mass Start F	World Cup	2nd
30	2010–11	31 December 2010	Oberhof, Germany	3.75 km Individual F	Stage World Cup	3rd
31	2010–11	5 January 2011	Toblach, Italy	1.3 km Sprint F	Stage World Cup	3rd
32	2010–11	5 January 2011	Cortina-Toblach, Italy	35 km Pursuit F	Stage World Cup	3rd
33	2010–11	8 January 2011	Val di Fiemme, Italy	20 km Mass Start C	Stage World Cup	1st
34	2010–11	31 December 2010 – 9 January 2011	(Germany) (Italy) Tour de Ski	Overall Standings	World Cup	2nd
35	2010–11	19 February 2011	Drammen, Norway	15 km Individual C	World Cup	3rd
36	2010–11	20 February 2011	Drammen, Norway	1.6 km Sprint F	World Cup	3rd
37	2010–11	16 March 2011	Stockholm, Sweden	1.0 km Sprint C	Stage World Cup	2nd
38	2010–11	18 March 2011	Falun, Sweden	3.3 km Individual C	Stage World Cup	2nd
39	2010–11	19 March 2011	Falun, Sweden	10 km + 10 km Pursuit C/F	Stage World Cup	1st
40	2010–11	16–20 March 2011	(Sweden) World Cup Final	Overall Standings	World Cup	1st
41	2011–12	19 November 2011	Sjusjøen, Norway	15 km Individual F	World Cup	2nd
42	2011–12	26 November 2011	Rukatunturi, Finland	10 km Individual F	Stage World Cup	1st
43	2011–12	25–27 November 2011	(Finland) Nordic Opening	Overall Standings	World Cup	1st
44	2011–12	10 December 2011	Davos, Switzerland	30 km Individual F	World Cup	1st
45	2011–12	17 December 2011	Rogla, Slovenia	15 km Mass Start C	World Cup	1st
46	2011–12	29 December 2011	Oberhof, Germany	3.75 km Individual F	Stage World Cup	1st
47	2011–12	30 December 2011	Oberhof, Germany	15 km Pursuit C	Stage World Cup	2nd
48	2011–12	1 January 2012	Oberhof, Germany	10 km + 10 km Skiathlon C/F	Stage World Cup	1st
49	2011–12	4 January 2012	Toblach, Italy	1.3 km Sprint F	Stage World Cup	2nd
50	2011–12	5 January 2012	Toblach, Italy	35 km Pursuit F	Stage World Cup	2nd
51	2011–12	29 December 2011 – 8 January 2012	(Germany) (Italy) Tour de Ski	Overall Standings	World Cup	3rd
52	2012–13	30 November 2012	Rukatunturi, Finland	1.4 km Sprint C	Stage World Cup	2nd
53	2012–13	1 December 2012	Rukatunturi, Finland	10 km Individual F	Stage World Cup	2nd
54	2012–13	30 November – 2 December 2012	(Finland) Nordic Opening	Overall Standings	World Cup	1st
55	2012–13	29 December 2012	Oberhof, Germany	4 km Individual F	Stage World Cup	1st
56	2012–13	30 December 2012	Oberhof, Germany	15 km Pursuit C	Stage World Cup	3rd
57	2012–13	3 January 2013	Cortina-Toblach, Italy	35 km Pursuit F	Stage World Cup	1st
58	2012–13	3 January 2013	Toblach, Italy	5 km Individual C	Stage World Cup	2nd
59	2012–13	1 February 2013	Sochi, Russia	1.8 km Sprint F	World Cup	1st
60	2012–13	10 March 2013	Lahti, Finland	15 km Individual C	World Cup	1st
61	2012–13	13 March 2013	Drammen, Norway	1.3 km Sprint C	World Cup	1st
62	2012–13	20 March 2013	Stockholm, Sweden	1.1 km Sprint C	Stage World Cup	1st
63	2012–13	22 March 2013	Falun, Sweden	3.75 km Individual F	Stage World Cup	1st
64	2012–13	20–24 March 2013	(Sweden) World Cup Final	Overall Standings	World Cup	1st
65	2013–14	3 January 2014	Cortina-Toblach, Italy	35 km Pursuit F	Stage World Cup	2nd
66	2013–14	4 January 2014	Val di Fiemme, Italy	10 km Individual C	Stage World Cup	1st
67	2013–14	28 December 2013 – 5 January 2014	(Germany) (Switzerland) (Italy) Tour de Ski	Overall Standings	World Cup	3rd
68	2014–15	29 November 2014	Rukatunturi, Finland	1.4 km Sprint C	World Cup	2nd
69	2014–15	24 December 2014	Davos, Switzerland	15 km Individual F	World Cup	2nd
70	2014–15	3 January 2015	Oberstdorf, Germany	4 km Individual F	Stage World Cup	3rd
71	2014–15	4 January 2015	Oberstdorf, Germany	15 km Pursuit C	Stage World Cup	1st
72	2014–15	6 January 2015	Val Müstair, Switzerland	1.4 km Sprint F	Stage World Cup	2nd
73	2014–15	8 January 2015	Toblach, Italy	25 km Pursuit F	Stage World Cup	1st
74	2014–15	3–11 January 2015	(Germany) (Switzerland) (Italy) Tour de Ski	Overall Standings	World Cup	1st
75	2015–16	27 November 2015	Rukatunturi, Finland	1.4 km Sprint C	Stage World Cup	3rd
76	2015–16	27–29 November 2015	(Finland) Nordic Opening	Overall Standings	World Cup	2nd
77	2015–16	2 January 2016	Lenzerheide, Switzerland	30 km Mass Start C	Stage World Cup	2nd
78	2015–16	3 January 2016	Lenzerheide, Switzerland	10 km Pursuit F	Stage World Cup	2nd
79	2015–16	3 February 2016	Drammen, Norway	1.2 km Sprint C	World Cup	1st
80	2015–16	11 February 2016	Stockholm, Sweden	1.2 km Sprint C	World Cup	3rd
81	2015–16	20 February 2016	Lahti, Finland	1.6 km Sprint F	World Cup	3rd
82	2015–16	2 March 2016	Montreal, Canada	17.5 km Mass Start F	Stage World Cup	2nd
83	2015–16	5 March 2016	Quebec City, Canada	15 km Pursuit	Stage World Cup	2nd
84	2015–16	1–12 March 2016	Ski Tour Canada	Overall Standings	World Cup	3rd

==== Team podiums ====
- 9 victories – (9 RL)
- 12 podiums – (12 RL)

No.	Season	Date	Location	Race	Level	Place	Teammates
1	2006–07	17 December 2006	La Clusaz, France	4 × 10 km Relay C/F	World Cup	2nd	Bjørndalen / Hetland / Rønning
2	2006–07	25 March 2007	Falun, Sweden	4 × 10 km Relay C/F	World Cup	1st	Pettersen Hjelmeset / Estil
3	2007–08	24 February 2008	Falun, Sweden	4 × 10 km Relay C/F	World Cup	1st	Sundby / Jespersen / Eilifsen
4	2008–09	23 November 2008	Gällivare, Sweden	4 × 10 km Relay C/F	World Cup	1st	Sundby / Rønning / Hofstad
5	2008–09	7 December 2008	La Clusaz, France	4 × 10 km Relay C/F	World Cup	1st	Hetland / Sundby / Gjerdalen
6	2009–10	22 November 2009	Beitostølen, Norway	4 × 10 km Relay C/F	World Cup	1st	Rønning / Sundby / Hafsås
7	2010–11	19 December 2010	La Clusaz, France	4 × 10 km Relay C/F	World Cup	3rd	Rønning / Sundby / Gjerdalen
8	2011–12	22 November 2011	Sjusjøen, Norway	4 × 10 km Relay C/F	World Cup	1st	Rønning / Krogh / Berger
9	2011–12	12 January 2012	Nové Město, Czech Republic	4 × 10 km Relay C/F	World Cup	1st	Rønning / Dyrhaug / Sundby
10	2012–13	25 November 2012	Gällivare, Sweden	4 × 7.5 km Relay C/F	World Cup	1st	Rønning / Sundby / Røthe
11	2013–14	8 December 2013	Lillehammer, Norway	4 × 7.5 km Relay C/F	World Cup	3rd	Golberg / Tønseth / Sundby
12	2015–16	6 December 2015	Gällivare, Sweden	4 × 7.5 km Relay C/F	World Cup	1st	Dyrhaug / Holund / Sundby

Awards
Preceded by Andreas Thorkildsen; Ole Einar Bjørndalen	Norwegian Sportsperson of the Year; 2009; 2015	Succeeded by Thor Hushovd; Ada Hegerberg
