= FIS Nordic World Ski Championships 2017 – Men's sprint =

Men's sprint at the FIS Nordic World Ski Championships 2017
- Location: Lahti, Finland
- Date: 23 February
- Competitors: 156 from 52 nations
- Winning time: 3:13.76

Medalists
| gold medal | Federico Pellegrino | Italy |
| silver medal | Sergey Ustiugov | Russia |
| bronze medal | Johannes Høsflot Klæbo | Norway |

The Men's sprint event of the FIS Nordic World Ski Championships 2017 was held on 23 February 2017.

== Results ==
=== Qualification ===
The qualification was held at 15:50.

| Rank | Bib | Athlete | Country | Time | Deficit | Note |
|---|---|---|---|---|---|---|
| 1 | 4 | Sergey Ustiugov | Russia | 3:11.72 | | Q |
| 2 | 8 | Finn Hågen Krogh | Norway | 3:14.43 | +2.71 | Q |
| 3 | 18 | Sindre Bjørnestad Skar | Norway | 3:15.11 | +3.39 | Q |
| 4 | 17 | Martti Jylhä | Finland | 3:15.58 | +3.86 | Q |
| 5 | 16 | Federico Pellegrino | Italy | 3:15.84 | +4.12 | Q |
| 6 | 15 | Johannes Høsflot Klæbo | Norway | 3:16.28 | +4.56 | Q |
| 7 | 1 | Lucas Chanavat | France | 3:17.25 | +5.53 | Q |
| 8 | 32 | Alexander Bolshunov | Russia | 3:17.27 | +5.55 | Q |
| 9 | 23 | Matias Strandvall | Finland | 3:17.44 | +5.72 | Q |
| 10 | 7 | Ristomatti Hakola | Finland | 3:17.47 | +5.75 | Q |
| 11 | 2 | Simeon Hamilton | United States | 3:19.32 | +7.60 | Q |
| 12 | 19 | Calle Halfvarsson | Sweden | 3:19.42 | +7.70 | Q |
| 13 | 5 | Alex Harvey | Canada | 3:19.57 | +7.85 | Q |
| 14 | 10 | Emil Iversen | Norway | 3:19.63 | +7.91 | Q |
| 15 | 26 | Anssi Pentsinen | Finland | 3:19.75 | +8.03 | Q |
| 16 | 14 | Anton Gafarov | Russia | 3:19.96 | +8.24 | Q |
| 17 | 12 | Jovian Hediger | Switzerland | 3:20.10 | +8.38 | Q |
| 18 | 3 | Gleb Retivykh | Russia | 3:20.17 | +8.45 | Q |
| 19 | 28 | Renaud Jay | France | 3:20.47 | +8.75 | Q |
| 20 | 9 | Andrew Newell | United States | 3:20.62 | +8.90 | Q |
| 21 | 36 | Dominik Baldauf | Austria | 3:20.68 | +8.96 | Q |
| 22 | 11 | Maciej Staręga | Poland | 3:20.84 | +9.12 | Q |
| 23 | 6 | Andrew Young | United Kingdom | 3:20.88 | +9.16 | Q |
| 24 | 22 | Oskar Svensson | Sweden | 3:20.91 | +9.19 | Q |
| 25 | 31 | Hiroyuki Miyazawa | Japan | 3:21.39 | +9.67 | Q |
| 26 | 20 | Teodor Peterson | Sweden | 3:21.41 | +9.69 | Q |
| 27 | 24 | Petter Northug | Norway | 3:21.42 | +9.70 | Q |
| 28 | 34 | Roman Furger | Switzerland | 3:21.76 | +10.04 | Q |
| 29 | 27 | Sebastian Eisenlauer | Germany | 3:21.78 | +10.06 | Q |
| 30 | 25 | Richard Jouve | France | 3:22.09 | +10.37 | Q |
| 31 | 21 | Baptiste Gros | France | 3:22.30 | +10.58 | |
| 32 | 33 | Karl-Johan Westberg | Sweden | 3:22.63 | +10.91 | |
| 33 | 29 | Bernhard Tritscher | Austria | 3:23.19 | +11.47 | |
| 34 | 40 | Mikhail Kuklin | Belarus | 3:23.44 | +11.72 | |
| 35 | 43 | Miha Šimenc | Slovenia | 3:23.62 | +11.90 | |
| 36 | 39 | Erik Bjornsen | United States | 3:24.31 | +12.59 | |
| 37 | 50 | Janez Lampič | Slovenia | 3:24.57 | +12.85 | |
| 38 | 42 | Simone Urbani | Italy | 3:25.09 | +13.37 | |
| 39 | 53 | Yury Astapenka | Belarus | 3:25.11 | +13.39 | |
| 40 | 51 | Denis Volotka | Kazakhstan | 3:25.39 | +13.67 | |
| 41 | 66 | Thomas Bing | Germany | 3:25.70 | +13.98 | |
| 42 | 37 | Jan Bartoň | Czech Republic | 3:27.34 | +15.62 | |
| 43 | 45 | Phillip Bellingham | Australia | 3:27.46 | +15.74 | |
| 44 | 61 | Michal Novák | Czech Republic | 3:28.07 | +16.35 | |
| 45 | 41 | Luis Stadlober | Austria | 3:28.27 | +16.55 | |
| 46 | 35 | Raido Ränkel | Estonia | 3:28.52 | +16.80 | |
| 47 | 38 | Jesse Cockney | Canada | 3:28.54 | +16.82 | |
| 48 | 13 | Len Väljas | Canada | 3:28.88 | +17.16 | |
| 49 | 72 | Ruslan Perekhoda | Ukraine | 3:29.08 | +17.36 | |
| 50 | 30 | Marko Kilp | Estonia | 3:29.30 | +17.58 | |
| 51 | 65 | Michail Semenov | Belarus | 3:29.47 | +17.75 | |
| 52 | 73 | Paul Constantin Pepene | Romania | 3:29.73 | +18.01 | |
| 53 | 44 | Knute Johnsgaard | Canada | 3:30.11 | +18.39 | |
| 54 | 49 | Morgan Cole | United States | 3:30.13 | +18.41 | |
| 55 | 59 | Aleš Razým | Czech Republic | 3:30.76 | +19.04 | |
| 56 | 71 | Daulet Rakhimbayev | Kazakhstan | 3:30.91 | +19.19 | |
| 57 | 76 | Alin Florin Cioancă | Romania | 3:31.18 | +19.46 | |
| 58 | 58 | Karel Tammjärv | Estonia | 3:31.75 | +20.03 | |
| 58 | 57 | Indulis Bikše | Latvia | 3:31.75 | +20.03 | |
| 60 | 54 | Edi Dadić | Croatia | 3:32.39 | +20.67 | |
| 61 | 82 | Ádám Kónya | Hungary | 3:32.96 | +21.24 | |
| 62 | 56 | Miha Dolar | Slovenia | 3:33.21 | +21.49 | |
| 63 | 92 | Raul Mihai Popa | Romania | 3:33.27 | +21.55 | |
| 64 | 63 | Miroslav Šulek | Slovakia | 3:33.41 | +21.69 | |
| 65 | 60 | Jan Antolec | Poland | 3:33.56 | +21.84 | |
| 66 | 48 | Paweł Klisz | Poland | 3:34.74 | +23.02 | |
| 67 | 46 | Modestas Vaičiulis | Lithuania | 3:35.08 | +23.36 | |
| 68 | 62 | Oleksiy Krasovsky | Ukraine | 3:35.34 | +23.62 | |
| 69 | 70 | Callum Watson | Australia | 3:35.94 | +24.22 | |
| 70 | 55 | Andrej Segeč | Slovakia | 3:36.27 | +24.55 | |
| 71 | 52 | Kristjan Koll | Estonia | 3:36.87 | +25.15 | |
| 72 | 86 | Lasse Hulgaard | Denmark | 3:36.99 | +25.27 | |
| 73 | 67 | Callum Smith | United Kingdom | 3:37.19 | +25.47 | |
| 74 | 80 | Imanol Rojo | Spain | 3:37.32 | +25.60 | |
| 75 | 87 | James Clugnet | United Kingdom | 3:37.50 | +25.78 | |
| 76 | 88 | Petrică Hogiu | Romania | 3:37.72 | +26.00 | |
| 77 | 69 | Thomas Hjalmar Westgård | Ireland | 3:38.22 | +26.50 | |
| 78 | 74 | Raimo Vīgants | Latvia | 3:38.44 | +26.72 | |
| 79 | 68 | Niklas Liederer | Austria | 3:38.52 | +26.80 | |
| 80 | 84 | Damir Rastić | Serbia | 3:38.56 | +26.84 | |
| 81 | 137 | Krešimir Crnković | Croatia | 3:40.62 | +28.90 | |
| 82 | 64 | Stepan Terentjev | Lithuania | 3:40.70 | +28.98 | |
| 83 | 91 | Mladen Plakalović | Bosnia and Herzegovina | 3:40.95 | +29.23 | |
| 84 | 148 | Thierry Langer | Belgium | 3:41.06 | +29.34 | |
| 85 | 81 | Andriy Orlyk | Ukraine | 3:41.34 | +29.62 | |
| 86 | 83 | Paul Kovacs | Australia | 3:42.69 | +30.97 | |
| 87 | 75 | Tautvydas Strolia | Lithuania | 3:43.20 | +31.48 | |
| 88 | 78 | Rudolf Michalovsky | Slovakia | 3:43.27 | +31.55 | |
| 89 | 79 | Hamza Dursun | Turkey | 3:44.86 | +33.14 | |
| 90 | 99 | Jānis Šņoriņš | Latvia | 3:45.44 | +33.72 | |
| 91 | 85 | Jaunius Drūsys | Lithuania | 3:46.37 | +34.65 | |
| 92 | 89 | Sævar Birgisson | Iceland | 3:47.30 | +35.58 | |
| 93 | 103 | Thibaut De Marre | Belgium | 3:47.94 | +36.22 | |
| 94 | 104 | Oleg Yoltukhovskyy | Ukraine | 3:48.42 | +36.70 | |
| 95 | 96 | Mikayel Mikayelyan | Armenia | 3:48.74 | +37.02 | |
| 96 | 100 | Ömer Ayçiçek | Turkey | 3:48.85 | +37.13 | |
| 97 | 108 | Rejhan Šmrković | Serbia | 3:49.60 | +37.88 | |
| 98 | 95 | Nikolay Viyachev | Bulgaria | 3:50.39 | +38.67 | |
| 99 | 90 | Yordan Chuchuganov | Bulgaria | 3:50.80 | +39.08 | |
| 100 | 77 | Martin Møller | Denmark | 3:51.11 | +39.39 | |
| 101 | 98 | Nick Montgomery | Australia | 3:51.13 | +39.41 | |
| 102 | 97 | Marko Skender | Croatia | 3:51.71 | +39.99 | |
| 103 | 118 | Amed Oğlağo | Turkey | 3:51.95 | +40.23 | |
| 104 | 106 | Emir Hrkalović | Serbia | 3:52.11 | +40.39 | |
| 105 | 113 | Károly Gombos | Hungary | 3:53.47 | +41.75 | |
| 106 | 122 | Yonathan Jesús Fernández | Chile | 3:54.45 | +42.73 | |
| 107 | 120 | Simeon Ognyanov | Bulgaria | 3:57.47 | +45.75 | |
| 108 | 93 | Sattar Seyd | Iran | 3:57.63 | +45.91 | |
| 109 | 94 | Ingmārs Briedis | Latvia | 3:57.99 | +46.27 | |
| 110 | 102 | Mirsad Pejčinović | Serbia | 3:58.75 | +47.03 | |
| 111 | 132 | Cristian Bocancea | Moldova | 3:59.41 | +47.69 | |
| 112 | 156 | Nicolae Gaiduc | Moldova | 3:59.63 | +47.91 | |
| 113 | 127 | Stavre Jada | Macedonia | 4:00.43 | +48.71 | |
| 114 | 119 | Tue Roemer | Denmark | 4:00.59 | +48.87 | |
| 115 | 114 | Brynjar Kristinsson | Iceland | 4:00.98 | +49.26 | |
| 116 | 115 | Ognjen Škipina | Bosnia and Herzegovina | 4:02.05 | +50.33 | |
| 117 | 129 | Miloš Čolić | Bosnia and Herzegovina | 4:02.91 | +51.19 | |
| 118 | 111 | Nikolaos Tsourekas | Greece | 4:03.20 | +51.48 | |
| 119 | 124 | Panagiotis Papasis | Greece | 4:03.38 | +51.66 | |
| 120 | 112 | Jakov Hladika | Croatia | 4:04.30 | +52.58 | |
| 121 | 126 | Juan Agurto | Chile | 4:04.39 | +52.67 | |
| 122 | 101 | Ivan Burgov | Bulgaria | 4:05.94 | +54.22 | |
| 123 | 109 | Albert Jonsson | Iceland | 4:08.33 | +56.61 | |
| 124 | 117 | Dávid Panyik | Hungary | 4:08.58 | +56.86 | |
| 125 | 130 | Kleanthis Karamichas | Greece | 4:10.52 | +58.80 | |
| 126 | 125 | Carlos Lannes | Argentina | 4:10.56 | +58.84 | |
| 127 | 128 | Jan Rossiter | Ireland | 4:10.83 | +59.11 | |
| 128 | 131 | Dimitrios Kyriazis | Greece | 4:11.00 | +59.28 | |
| 129 | 152 | Stephan Langer | Belgium | 4:11.01 | +59.29 | |
| 130 | 123 | Bence Bánszki | Hungary | 4:13.30 | +1:01.58 | |
| 131 | 121 | Yasin Shemshaki | Iran | 4:14.17 | +1:02.45 | |
| 132 | 154 | Liviu Dubălari | Moldova | 4:14.85 | +1:03.13 | |
| 133 | 133 | Milancho Krsteski | Macedonia | 4:16.93 | +1:05.21 | |
| 134 | 107 | Yaghoob Kiashemshaki | Iran | 4:17.02 | +1:05.30 | |
| 135 | 110 | Victor Santos | Brazil | 4:19.79 | +1:08.07 | |
| 136 | 116 | Alireza Maghdid | Iran | 4:24.45 | +1:12.73 | |
| 137 | 138 | Miljan Radulović | Montenegro | 4:24.90 | +1:13.18 | |
| 138 | 150 | Nikolai Matveev | Kyrgyzstan | 4:27.20 | +1:15.48 | |
| 139 | 158 | Vivek Kaktwan | India | 4:29.67 | +1:17.95 | |
| 140 | 140 | Stephen O'Mara | Ireland | 4:40.13 | +1:28.41 | |
| 141 | 139 | Mario Kurteski | Macedonia | 4:42.15 | +1:30.43 | |
| 142 | 149 | Sveatoslav Maliutin | Moldova | 4:46.59 | +1:34.87 | |
| 143 | 141 | Brian Kennedy | Ireland | 4:58.14 | +1:46.42 | |
| 144 | 151 | Mansour Bazouni | Lebanon | 5:01.18 | +1:49.46 | |
| 145 | 134 | Mark Rajack | Trinidad and Tobago | 5:09.15 | +1:57.43 | |
| 146 | 136 | Klaus Jungbluth | Ecuador | 5:10.65 | +1:58.93 | |
| 147 | 144 | José Chang Calle | Ecuador | 5:10.80 | +1:59.08 | |
| 148 | 135 | César Baena | Venezuela | 5:15.33 | +2:03.61 | |
| 149 | 143 | Mirko Bulatović | Montenegro | 5:23.37 | +2:11.65 | |
| 150 | 155 | Anthony Tawk | Lebanon | 5:36.96 | +2:25.24 | |
| 151 | 157 | Bernardo Baena | Venezuela | 5:43.89 | +2:32.17 | |
| 152 | 142 | Shiva Kumar BM | India | 5:44.35 | +2:32.63 | |
| 153 | 147 | Pita Taufatofua | Tonga | 5:44.72 | +2:33.00 | |
| 154 | 145 | Veljko Grbović | Montenegro | 5:47.99 | +2:36.27 | |
| 155 | 146 | Donato Agostinelli | Venezuela | 8:38.04 | +5:26.32 | |
| 156 | 153 | Adrián Solano | Venezuela | 13:49.33 | +10:37.61 | |
| — | 47 | Peter Mlynár | Slovakia | DNS | | |
| — | 105 | Jens Hulgaard | Denmark | DNS | | |

=== Quarterfinals ===
The quarterfinals were started at 17:58. The top two placed and the two fastest skiers not placed first or second in their heat, qualified for the semifinals.

==== Quarterfinal 1 ====
| Rank | Seed | Athlete | Country | Time | Deficit | Note |
|---|---|---|---|---|---|---|
| 1 | 27 | Petter Northug | Norway | 3:22.63 | | Q |
| 2 | 1 | Sergey Ustiugov | Russia | 3:22.83 | +0.19 | Q |
| 3 | 3 | Sindre Bjørnestad Skar | Norway | 3:23.17 | +0.57 | |
| 4 | 24 | Oskar Svensson | Sweden | 3:23.65 | +1.16 | |
| 5 | 28 | Roman Furger | Switzerland | 3:23.67 | +1.18 | |
| 6 | 8 | Alexander Bolshunov | Russia | 3:25.55 | +2.95 | |

==== Quarterfinal 2 ====
| Rank | Seed | Athlete | Country | Time | Deficit | Note |
|---|---|---|---|---|---|---|
| 1 | 5 | Federico Pellegrino | Italy | 3:24.78 | | Q |
| 2 | 6 | Johannes Høsflot Klæbo | Norway | 3:25.53 | +0.78 | Q |
| 3 | 30 | Richard Jouve | France | 3:26.00 | +1.25 | |
| 4 | 29 | Sebastian Eisenlauer | Germany | 3:26.36 | +1.61 | |
| 5 | 26 | Teodor Peterson | Sweden | 3:34.59 | +9.84 | |
| 6 | 11 | Simi Hamilton | United States | 3:59.83 | +35.08 | |

==== Quarterfinal 3 ====
| Rank | Seed | Athlete | Country | Time | Deficit | Note |
|---|---|---|---|---|---|---|
| 1 | 12 | Calle Halfvarsson | Sweden | 3:23.77 | | Q |
| 2 | 22 | Maciej Staręga | Poland | 3:23.94 | +0.18 | Q |
| 3 | 7 | Lucas Chanavat | France | 3:24.25 | +0.51 | |
| 4 | 16 | Anton Gafarov | Russia | 3:25.65 | +1.91 | |
| 5 | 23 | Andrew Young | Great Britain | 3:35.04 | +11.30 | |
| 6 | 9 | Matias Strandvall | Finland | 4:09.32 | +45.58 | |

==== Quarterfinal 4 ====
| Rank | Seed | Athlete | Country | Time | Deficit | Note |
|---|---|---|---|---|---|---|
| 1 | 2 | Finn Hågen Krogh | Norway | 3:21.38 | | Q |
| 2 | 10 | Ristomatti Hakola | Finland | 3:22.04 | +0.66 | Q |
| 3 | 4 | Martti Jylhä | Finland | 3:22.30 | +0.92 | q |
| 4 | 17 | Jovian Hediger | Switzerland | 3:22.76 | +1.38 | q |
| 5 | 20 | Andrew Newell | United States | 3:23.13 | +1.75 | |
| 6 | 19 | Renaud Jay | France | 3:23.36 | +1.98 | |

==== Quarterfinal 5 ====
| Rank | Seed | Athlete | Country | Time | Deficit | Note |
|---|---|---|---|---|---|---|
| 1 | 14 | Emil Iversen | Norway | 3:22.81 | | Q |
| 2 | 13 | Alex Harvey | Canada | 3:23.16 | +0.35 | Q |
| 3 | 18 | Gleb Retivykh | Russia | 3:23.43 | +0.62 | |
| 4 | 21 | Dominik Baldauf | Austria | 3:23.70 | +0.89 | |
| 5 | 25 | Hiroyuki Miyazawa | Japan | 3:23.95 | +1.14 | |
| 6 | 15 | Anssi Pentsinen | Finland | 3:24.73 | +1.92 | |

=== Semifinals ===
The semifinals were started at 18:40. The top two placed and the two fastest skiers not placed first or second in their heat, qualified for the final.

==== Semifinal 1 ====
| Rank | Seed | Athlete | Country | Time | Deficit | Note |
|---|---|---|---|---|---|---|
| 1 | 5 | Federico Pellegrino | Italy | 3:20.59 | | Q |
| 2 | 1 | Sergey Ustiugov | Russia | 3:20.87 | +0.28 | Q |
| 3 | 6 | Johannes Høsflot Klæbo | Norway | 3:20.92 | +0.33 | q |
| 4 | 27 | Petter Northug | Norway | 3:21.55 | +0.96 | q |
| 5 | 12 | Calle Halfvarsson | Sweden | 3:31.62 | +11.03 | |
| 6 | 17 | Jovian Hediger | Switzerland | 3:37.06 | +16.47 | |

==== Semifinal 2 ====
| Rank | Seed | Athlete | Country | Time | Deficit | Note |
|---|---|---|---|---|---|---|
| 1 | 2 | Finn Hågen Krogh | Norway | 3:23.70 | | Q |
| 2 | 10 | Ristomatti Hakola | Finland | 3:24.25 | +0.55 | Q |
| 3 | 4 | Martti Jylhä | Finland | 3:24.60 | +0.90 | |
| 4 | 22 | Maciej Staręga | Poland | 3:24.83 | +1.13 | |
| 5 | 14 | Emil Iversen | Norway | 4:00.92 | +37.22 | |
| — | 13 | Alex Harvey | Canada | DSQ | | |

=== Final ===
The final was started at 19:07.

| Rank | Seed | Athlete | Country | Time | Deficit | Note |
|---|---|---|---|---|---|---|
| 1st place, gold medalist(s) | 5 | Federico Pellegrino | Italy | 3:13.76 | | |
| 2nd place, silver medalist(s) | 1 | Sergey Ustiugov | Russia | 3:13.91 | +0.15 | |
| 3rd place, bronze medalist(s) | 6 | Johannes Høsflot Klæbo | Norway | 3:14.20 | +0.44 | |
| 4 | 2 | Finn Hågen Krogh | Norway | 3:14.43 | +0.67 | |
| 5 | 27 | Petter Northug | Norway | 3:25.89 | +12.13 | |
| 6 | 10 | Ristomatti Hakola | Finland | 3:26.04 | +12.28 | |
