= 2015 NCAA Skiing Championships =

American college skiing competition

The 2015 NCAA Skiing Championships were held in Lake Placid, New York, on March 11–14, 2015. St. Lawrence hosted the event with all alpine and Nordic events taking place at Olympic Center. It was the first time St. Lawrence served as host of the championship and it was the third time it was held in Lake Placid, the other times being 1980 and 1982.

== Regional Competitions ==
The NCAA skiing landscape is made up of three regions, each with one conference. The Western Region comprises the Rocky Mountain Intercollegiate Ski Association (RMISA), the Central Region of the Central Collegiate Ski Association (CCSA) and the Eastern Region of the Eastern Intercollegiate Ski Association (EISA). Qualification for the NCAA Championships is not only attained from competition in each regional.

Regional championships took place two or three weeks prior to the NCAA Championships.

== Venues And Events ==
The NCAA Skiing Championships are coed championship made up of eight events, two events in both alpine and Nordic racing for both men and women. Alpine events are giant slalom and slalom and Nordic events are classical and freestyle (skate). In Nordic competition, there is typically one shorter interval start race and one longer mass start race, and every two years it flips.

In 2015, the events were: Men's Giant slalom and Women's giant slalom; Men's and Women's Classical; Men's and Women's slalom; and Men's and Women's Freestyle. One alpine race is normally run to completion and the other normally alternates between men and women's first and second runs. Nordic distances are 5K and 15K for women's races and 10K and 20K for men's. One Nordic race was an interval start and the other a mass start.

All events took place at Olympic Center in Lake Placid.
