= Baptiste Gros =

French cross-country skier (born 1990)

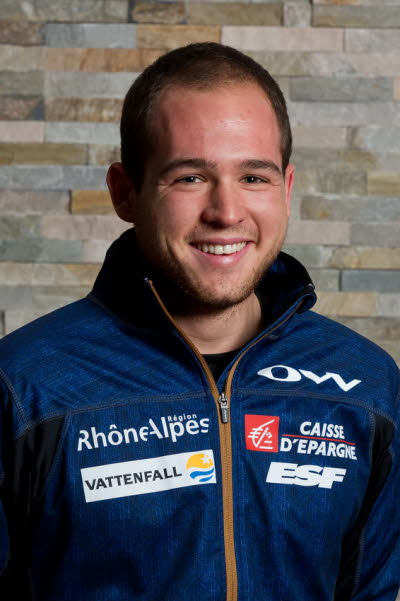

Personal information
- Nationality: France
- Born: 17 July 1990 (age 35) Annecy, France

Sport
- Sport: Skiing
- Club: Les Dragons d'Annecy

World Cup career
- Seasons: 11 – (2011–2021)
- Indiv. starts: 92
- Indiv. podiums: 5
- Indiv. wins: 1
- Team starts: 14
- Team podiums: 2
- Team wins: 0
- Overall titles: 0 – (24th in 2016)
- Discipline titles: 0

Baptiste Gros (born 17 July 1990 in Annecy) is a French cross-country skier.

Gros competed at the 2014 Winter Olympics for France. He placed 40th in the qualifying round in the sprint, failing to advance to the knockout stages.

Gros made his World Cup debut in December 2010. As of January 2016, he has four World Cup podium finishes, three seconds and a third, all in sprint disciplines. His best World Cup overall finish is 76th, in 2013–14. His best World Cup finish in a discipline is 32nd, in the 2013-14 sprint.

== Cross-country skiing results ==
=== Olympic Games ===
Year	Age	15 km individual	30 km skiathlon	50 km mass start	Sprint	4 × 10 km relay	Team sprint
2014	23	—	—	—	40	—	—
2018	27	—	—	—	12	—	—

=== World Championships ===
Year	Age	15 km individual	30 km skiathlon	50 km mass start	Sprint	4 × 10 km relay	Team sprint
2015	24	—	—	—	—	—	10
2017	26	—	—	—	31	—	—
2019	28	—	—	—	14	—	—

=== World Cup ===
==== Season standings ====
Season	Age	Discipline standings			Ski Tour standings				
Season	Age	Overall	Distance	Sprint	Nordic Opening	Tour de Ski	Ski Tour 2020	World Cup Final	Ski Tour Canada
2011	20	NC	—	NC	—	—	—N/a	—	—N/a
2012	21	110	—	57	—	—	—N/a	—	—N/a
2013	22	100	—	51	—	—	—N/a	—	—N/a
2014	23	75	—	32	—	—	—N/a	—	—N/a
2015	24	49	NC	15	DNF	DNF	—N/a	—N/a	—N/a
2016	25	24	NC	4	DNF	DNF	—N/a	—N/a	47
2017	26	52	NC	20	DNF	—	—N/a	50	—N/a
2018	27	45	NC	16	DNF	DNF	—N/a	50	—N/a
2019	28	41	NC	14	DNF	DNF	—N/a	49	—N/a
2020	29	NC	NC	NC	DNF	—	—	—N/a	—N/a
2021	30	NC	—	NC	—	—	—N/a	—N/a	—N/a

==== Individual podiums ====
- 1 victory – (1 SWC)
- 5 podiums – (4 WC, 1 SWC)

No.	Season	Date	Location	Race	Level	Place
1	2013–14	18 January 2014	Szklarska Poręba, Poland	1.5 km Sprint F	World Cup	3rd
2	2015–16	13 December 2015	Davos, Switzerland	1.6 km Sprint F	World Cup	2nd
3	2015–16	16 January 2016	Planica, Slovenia	1.2 km Sprint F	World Cup	2nd
4	2015–16	4 March 2016	Quebec City, Canada	1.7 km Sprint F	Stage World Cup	1st
5	2018–19	15 December 2018	Davos, Switzerland	1.5 km Sprint F	World Cup	3rd

==== Team podiums ====
- 2 podiums – (2 TS)

No.	Season	Date	Location	Race	Level	Place	Teammate
1	2015–16	17 January 2016	Planica, Slovenia	6 × 1.2 km Team Sprint F	World Cup	2nd	Jay
2	2016–17	5 February 2017	Pyeongchang, South Korea	6 × 1.5 km Team Sprint F	World Cup	2nd	Chanavat
