= 2015–16 FIS Cross-Country World Cup =

Cross-country skiing competition

Discipline	Men	Women
Overall	(Norway) Martin Johnsrud Sundby (2nd title)	(Norway) Therese Johaug (2nd title)
Distance	(Norway) Martin Johnsrud Sundby	(Norway) Therese Johaug
Sprint	(Italy) Federico Pellegrino	(Norway) Maiken Caspersen Falla
U-23	(Italy) Francesco De Fabiani	(Sweden) Stina Nilsson
Nations Cup	Norway	Norway
- Nations Cup Overall: Norway

Stage events
Nordic Opening	(Norway) Martin Johnsrud Sundby	(Norway) Therese Johaug
Tour de Ski	(Norway) Martin Johnsrud Sundby	(Norway) Therese Johaug
Ski Tour Canada	(Norway) Martin Johnsrud Sundby	(Norway) Therese Johaug

Competition
Locations	19 venues	19 venues
Individual	33 events	33 events
Relay/Team	3 events	3 events

The 2015–16 FIS Cross-Country World Cup was the 35th official World Cup season in cross-country skiing for men and women. The season started on 27 November 2015 in Ruka, Finland, and ended on 12 March 2016 in Canmore, Alberta, Canada.

Therese Johaug set a new record for total points in one season, with 2681. Martin Johnsrud Sundby set a new men's record for total points in one season, with 2634. Sundby won 14 races during the season and surpassed Petter Northug's record of nine victories which he achieved in both 2009–10 and 2012–13. Johaug won 17 races during this season and equaled Marit Bjørgen's record from 2011–12; a record Johaug herself eclipsed with 20 victories in the 2019–20 season.

== Calendar ==
=== Men ===
C – Classic / F – Freestyle
WC	Stage	Date	Place	Discipline	Winner	Second	Third	Yellow bib	Ref.
	1	27 November 2015	(Finland) Ruka	Sprint C	(Norway) Sondre Turvoll Fossli	(Norway) Eirik Brandsdal	(Norway) Petter Northug	(Norway) Sondre Turvoll Fossli	
	2	28 November 2015	(Finland) Ruka	10 km F	(Norway) Martin Johnsrud Sundby	(Canada) Alex Harvey	(Switzerland) Dario Cologna	(Norway) Martin Johnsrud Sundby	
	3	29 November 2015	(Finland) Ruka	15 km C Pursuit	(Norway) Niklas Dyrhaug	(Norway) Martin Johnsrud Sundby	(Norway) Sjur Røthe	(Norway) Martin Johnsrud Sundby	
1	6th Nordic Opening Overall (27–29 November 2015)				(Norway) Martin Johnsrud Sundby	(Norway) Petter Northug	(Norway) Finn Hågen Krogh	(Norway) Martin Johnsrud Sundby	
2	4	5 December 2015	(Norway) Lillehammer	30 km Skiathlon	(Norway) Martin Johnsrud Sundby	(Norway) Niklas Dyrhaug	(Norway) Hans Christer Holund	(Norway) Martin Johnsrud Sundby	
3	5	12 December 2015	(Switzerland) Davos	30 km F	(Norway) Martin Johnsrud Sundby	(France) Maurice Manificat	(Norway) Anders Gløersen	(Norway) Martin Johnsrud Sundby	
4	6	13 December 2015	(Switzerland) Davos	Sprint F	(Italy) Federico Pellegrino	(France) Baptiste Gros	(Norway) Sondre Turvoll Fossli	(Norway) Martin Johnsrud Sundby	
5	7	19 December 2015	(Italy) Toblach	Sprint F	(Italy) Federico Pellegrino	(United States) Simeon Hamilton	(United Kingdom) Andrew Young	(Norway) Martin Johnsrud Sundby	
6	8	20 December 2015	(Italy) Toblach	15 km C	(Norway) Martin Johnsrud Sundby	(Russia) Alexander Bessmertnykh	(Norway) Sjur Røthe	(Norway) Martin Johnsrud Sundby	
	9	1 January 2016	(Switzerland) Lenzerheide	Sprint F	(Italy) Federico Pellegrino	(Russia) Sergey Ustiugov	(Norway) Finn Hågen Krogh	(Norway) Martin Johnsrud Sundby	
	10	2 January 2016	(Switzerland) Lenzerheide	30 km C Mass Start	(Norway) Martin Johnsrud Sundby	(Norway) Petter Northug	(Norway) Didrik Tønseth	(Norway) Martin Johnsrud Sundby	
	11	3 January 2016	(Switzerland) Lenzerheide	10 km F Pursuit	(Norway) Martin Johnsrud Sundby	(Norway) Petter Northug	(Norway) Finn Hågen Krogh	(Norway) Martin Johnsrud Sundby	
	12	5 January 2016	(Germany) Oberstdorf	Sprint C	(Norway) Emil Iversen	(Russia) Sergey Ustiugov	(Kazakhstan) Alexey Poltoranin	(Norway) Martin Johnsrud Sundby	
	13	6 January 2016	(Germany) Oberstdorf	15 km C Mass Start	(Kazakhstan) Alexey Poltoranin	(Switzerland) Dario Cologna	(Italy) Francesco De Fabiani	(Norway) Martin Johnsrud Sundby	
	14	8 January 2016	(Italy) Toblach	10 km F	(Norway) Finn Hågen Krogh	(Norway) Martin Johnsrud Sundby	(France) Maurice Manificat	(Norway) Martin Johnsrud Sundby	
	15	9 January 2016	(Italy) Val di Fiemme	15 km C Mass Start	(Norway) Martin Johnsrud Sundby	(Norway) Niklas Dyrhaug	(Kazakhstan) Alexey Poltoranin	(Norway) Martin Johnsrud Sundby	
	16	10 January 2016	(Italy) Val di Fiemme	9 km F Pursuit climb	(Norway) Martin Johnsrud Sundby	(France) Robin Duvillard	(Finland) Matti Heikkinen	(Norway) Martin Johnsrud Sundby	
7	10th Tour de Ski Overall (1–10 January 2016)				(Norway) Martin Johnsrud Sundby	(Norway) Finn Hågen Krogh	(Russia) Sergey Ustiugov	(Norway) Martin Johnsrud Sundby	
8	17	16 January 2016	(Slovenia) Planica	Sprint F	(Italy) Federico Pellegrino	(France) Baptiste Gros	(France) Richard Jouve	(Norway) Martin Johnsrud Sundby	
9	18	23 January 2016	(Czech Republic) Nové Město na Moravě	15 km F	(France) Maurice Manificat	(Norway) Martin Johnsrud Sundby	(Russia) Sergey Ustiugov	(Norway) Martin Johnsrud Sundby	
10	19	3 February 2016	(Norway) Drammen	Sprint C	(Norway) Petter Northug	(Norway) Ola Vigen Hattestad	(Norway) Eirik Brandsdal	(Norway) Martin Johnsrud Sundby	
11	20	6 February 2016	(Norway) Oslo	50 km C Mass Start	(Norway) Martin Johnsrud Sundby	(Norway) Niklas Dyrhaug	(Russia) Maxim Vylegzhanin	(Norway) Martin Johnsrud Sundby	
12	21	11 February 2016	(Sweden) Stockholm	Sprint C	(Russia) Nikita Kryukov	(Norway) Ola Vigen Hattestad	(Norway) Petter Northug	(Norway) Martin Johnsrud Sundby	
13	22	13 February 2016	(Sweden) Falun	10 km C	(Russia) Maxim Vylegzhanin	(Russia) Alexander Bessmertnykh	(France) Maurice Manificat	(Norway) Martin Johnsrud Sundby	
14	23	14 February 2016	(Sweden) Falun	15 km F Mass Start	(Russia) Sergey Ustiugov	(Italy) Francesco De Fabiani	(Norway) Martin Johnsrud Sundby	(Norway) Martin Johnsrud Sundby	
15	24	20 February 2016	(Finland) Lahti	Sprint F	(Norway) Emil Iversen	(Norway) Finn Hågen Krogh	(Norway) Petter Northug	(Norway) Martin Johnsrud Sundby	
16	25	21 February 2016	(Finland) Lahti	30 km Skiathlon	(Norway) Martin Johnsrud Sundby	(Norway) Finn Hågen Krogh	(Norway) Hans Christer Holund	(Norway) Martin Johnsrud Sundby	
	26	1 March 2016	(Canada) Gatineau	Sprint F	(Russia) Sergey Ustiugov	(France) Richard Jouve	(United States) Simeon Hamilton	(Norway) Martin Johnsrud Sundby	
	27	2 March 2016	(Canada) Montreal	17.5 km C Mass Start	(Norway) Emil Iversen	(Norway) Petter Northug	(Russia) Sergey Ustiugov	(Norway) Martin Johnsrud Sundby	
	28	4 March 2016	(Canada) Quebec City	Sprint F	(France) Baptiste Gros	(Canada) Alex Harvey	(Russia) Sergey Ustiugov	(Norway) Martin Johnsrud Sundby	
	29	5 March 2016	(Canada) Quebec City	15 km F Pursuit	(Russia) Sergey Ustiugov	(Norway) Petter Northug	(Norway) Emil Iversen	(Norway) Martin Johnsrud Sundby	
	30	8 March 2016	(Canada) Canmore	Sprint C	(Italy) Federico Pellegrino	(Norway) Eirik Brandsdal	(France) Maurice Manificat	(Norway) Martin Johnsrud Sundby	
	31	9 March 2016	(Canada) Canmore	30 km Skiathlon	(Norway) Martin Johnsrud Sundby	(Russia) Sergey Ustiugov	(Finland) Matti Heikkinen	(Norway) Martin Johnsrud Sundby	
	32	11 March 2016	(Canada) Lake Louise	15 km F	(Finland) Matti Heikkinen	(Russia) Evgeniy Belov	(Sweden) Marcus Hellner	(Norway) Martin Johnsrud Sundby	
	33	12 March 2016	(Canada) Canmore	15 km C Pursuit	(France) Maurice Manificat	(Finland) Matti Heikkinen	(Norway) Martin Johnsrud Sundby	(Norway) Martin Johnsrud Sundby	
17	1st Ski Tour Canada Overall (1–12 March 2016)				(Norway) Martin Johnsrud Sundby	(Russia) Sergey Ustiugov	(Norway) Petter Northug	(Norway) Martin Johnsrud Sundby	

=== Women ===
WC	Stage	Date	Place	Discipline	Winner	Second	Third	Yellow bib	Ref.
	1	27 November 2015	(Finland) Ruka	Sprint C	(Norway) Maiken Caspersen Falla	(Sweden) Stina Nilsson	(Norway) Ragnhild Haga	(Norway) Maiken Caspersen Falla	
	2	28 November 2015	(Finland) Ruka	5 km F	(Norway) Therese Johaug	(Sweden) Charlotte Kalla	(Sweden) Ida Ingemarsdotter	(Sweden) Ida Ingemarsdotter	
	3	29 November 2015	(Finland) Ruka	10 km C Pursuit	(Norway) Therese Johaug	(Sweden) Stina Nilsson	(Finland) Kerttu Niskanen	(Norway) Therese Johaug	
1	6th Nordic Opening Overall (27–29 November 2015)				(Norway) Therese Johaug	(Sweden) Stina Nilsson	(Norway) Ingvild Flugstad Østberg	(Norway) Therese Johaug	
2	4	5 December 2015	(Norway) Lillehammer	15 km Skiathlon	(Norway) Therese Johaug	(Norway) Heidi Weng	(Sweden) Charlotte Kalla	(Norway) Therese Johaug	
3	5	12 December 2015	(Switzerland) Davos	15 km F	(Norway) Therese Johaug	(Norway) Ingvild Flugstad Østberg	(Norway) Heidi Weng	(Norway) Therese Johaug	
4	6	13 December 2015	(Switzerland) Davos	Sprint F	(Sweden) Stina Nilsson	(Norway) Maiken Caspersen Falla	(Norway) Ingvild Flugstad Østberg	(Norway) Therese Johaug	
5	7	19 December 2015	(Italy) Toblach	Sprint F	(Norway) Maiken Caspersen Falla	(Norway) Ingvild Flugstad Østberg	(Sweden) Stina Nilsson	(Norway) Therese Johaug	
6	8	20 December 2015	(Italy) Toblach	10 km C	(Norway) Therese Johaug	(Finland) Krista Pärmäkoski	(Norway) Ingvild Flugstad Østberg	(Norway) Therese Johaug	
	9	1 January 2016	(Switzerland) Lenzerheide	Sprint F	(Norway) Maiken Caspersen Falla	(Sweden) Ida Ingemarsdotter	(Norway) Ingvild Flugstad Østberg	(Norway) Therese Johaug	
	10	2 January 2016	(Switzerland) Lenzerheide	15 km C Mass Start	(Norway) Therese Johaug	(Norway) Ingvild Flugstad Østberg	(Norway) Heidi Weng	(Norway) Therese Johaug	
	11	3 January 2016	(Switzerland) Lenzerheide	5 km F Pursuit	(Norway) Ingvild Flugstad Østberg	(Norway) Therese Johaug	(Norway) Heidi Weng	(Norway) Therese Johaug	
	12	5 January 2016	(Germany) Oberstdorf	Sprint C	(United States) Sophie Caldwell	(Norway) Heidi Weng	(Norway) Ingvild Flugstad Østberg	(Norway) Therese Johaug	
	13	6 January 2016	(Germany) Oberstdorf	10 km C Mass Start	(Norway) Therese Johaug	(Norway) Ingvild Flugstad Østberg	(Norway) Heidi Weng	(Norway) Therese Johaug	
	14	8 January 2016	(Italy) Toblach	5 km F	(United States) Jessie Diggins	(Norway) Heidi Weng	(Norway) Ingvild Flugstad Østberg	(Norway) Therese Johaug	
	15	9 January 2016	(Italy) Val di Fiemme	10 km C Mass Start	(Norway) Heidi Weng	(Norway) Ingvild Flugstad Østberg	(Norway) Therese Johaug	(Norway) Therese Johaug	
	16	10 January 2016	(Italy) Val di Fiemme	9 km F Pursuit climb	(Norway) Therese Johaug	(Norway) Heidi Weng	(United States) Elizabeth Stephen	(Norway) Therese Johaug	
7	10th Tour de Ski Overall (1–10 January 2016)				(Norway) Therese Johaug	(Norway) Ingvild Flugstad Østberg	(Norway) Heidi Weng	(Norway) Therese Johaug	
8	17	16 January 2016	(Slovenia) Planica	Sprint F	(Sweden) Stina Nilsson	(Norway) Astrid Uhrenholdt Jacobsen	(Norway) Heidi Weng	(Norway) Therese Johaug	
9	18	23 January 2016	(Czech Republic) Nové Město na Moravě	10 km F	(Norway) Therese Johaug	(Norway) Astrid Uhrenholdt Jacobsen	(United States) Jessie Diggins	(Norway) Therese Johaug	
10	19	3 February 2016	(Norway) Drammen	Sprint C	(Norway) Maiken Caspersen Falla	(Norway) Ingvild Flugstad Østberg	(Russia) Natalya Matveyeva	(Norway) Therese Johaug	
11	20	7 February 2016	(Norway) Oslo	30 km C Mass Start	(Norway) Therese Johaug	(Norway) Ingvild Flugstad Østberg	(Finland) Anne Kyllönen	(Norway) Therese Johaug	
12	21	11 February 2016	(Sweden) Stockholm	Sprint C	(Norway) Maiken Caspersen Falla	(Norway) Ingvild Flugstad Østberg	(Sweden) Stina Nilsson	(Norway) Therese Johaug	
13	22	13 February 2016	(Sweden) Falun	5 km C	(Norway) Therese Johaug	(Norway) Heidi Weng	(Norway) Ingvild Flugstad Østberg	(Norway) Therese Johaug	
14	23	14 February 2016	(Sweden) Falun	10 km F Mass Start	(Norway) Therese Johaug	(Norway) Heidi Weng	(Norway) Astrid Uhrenholdt Jacobsen	(Norway) Therese Johaug	
15	24	20 February 2016	(Finland) Lahti	Sprint F	(Norway) Maiken Caspersen Falla	(United States) Jessie Diggins	(Norway) Heidi Weng	(Norway) Therese Johaug	
16	25	21 February 2016	(Finland) Lahti	15 km Skiathlon	(Norway) Therese Johaug	(Norway) Heidi Weng	(Norway) Ingvild Flugstad Østberg	(Norway) Therese Johaug	
	26	1 March 2016	(Canada) Gatineau	Sprint F	(Norway) Maiken Caspersen Falla	(Sweden) Stina Nilsson	(United States) Jessie Diggins	(Norway) Therese Johaug	
	27	2 March 2016	(Canada) Montreal	10.5 km C Mass Start	(Norway) Therese Johaug	(Norway) Heidi Weng	(Norway) Astrid Uhrenholdt Jacobsen	(Norway) Therese Johaug	
	28	4 March 2016	(Canada) Quebec City	Sprint F	(Sweden) Stina Nilsson	(Norway) Maiken Caspersen Falla	(Norway) Heidi Weng	(Norway) Therese Johaug	
	29	5 March 2016	(Canada) Quebec City	10 km F Pursuit	(Norway) Heidi Weng	(Norway) Therese Johaug	(Norway) Astrid Uhrenholdt Jacobsen	(Norway) Therese Johaug	
	30	8 March 2016	(Canada) Canmore	Sprint C	(Norway) Maiken Caspersen Falla	(Norway) Astrid Uhrenholdt Jacobsen	(Norway) Ingvild Flugstad Østberg	(Norway) Therese Johaug	
	31	9 March 2016	(Canada) Canmore	15 km Skiathlon	(Norway) Heidi Weng	(Norway) Therese Johaug	(Norway) Astrid Uhrenholdt Jacobsen	(Norway) Therese Johaug	
	32	11 March 2016	(Canada) Lake Louise	10 km F	(Norway) Ingvild Flugstad Østberg	(Norway) Heidi Weng	(Finland) Krista Pärmäkoski	(Norway) Therese Johaug	
	33	12 March 2016	(Canada) Canmore	10 km C Pursuit	(Finland) Krista Pärmäkoski	(Norway) Therese Johaug	(United States) Jessie Diggins	(Norway) Therese Johaug	
17	1st Ski Tour Canada Overall (1–12 March 2016)				(Norway) Therese Johaug	(Norway) Heidi Weng	(Norway) Ingvild Flugstad Østberg	(Norway) Therese Johaug	

=== Men's team ===
WC	Stage	Date	Place	Discipline	Winner	Second	Third	Ref.
1	1	6 December 2015	(Norway) Lillehammer	4 x 7.5 km Relay C/F	Norway I Niklas Dyrhaug; Hans Christer Holund; Martin Johnsrud Sundby; Petter Northug	Norway III Martin Løwstrøm Nyenget; Mathias Rundgreen; Simen Andreas Sveen; Finn Hågen Krogh	Norway II Emil Iversen; Didrik Tønseth; Sjur Røthe; Anders Gløersen	
2	2	17 January 2016	(Slovenia) Planica	Team Sprint F	Italy I Dietmar Nöckler; Federico Pellegrino	France I Renaud Jay; Baptiste Gros	France II Valentin Chauvin; Richard Jouve	
3	3	24 January 2016	(Czech Republic) Nové Město na Moravě	4 x 7.5 km Relay	Norway I Sjur Røthe; Martin Johnsrud Sundby; Mathias Rundgreen; Finn Hågen Krogh	Russia I Evgeniy Belov; Alexander Legkov; Aleksey Chervotkin; Sergey Ustiugov	Italy Dietmar Nöckler; Francesco De Fabiani; Roland Clara; Federico Pellegrino	

=== Women's team ===
WC	Stage	Date	Place	Discipline	Winner	Second	Third	Ref.
1	1	6 December 2015	(Norway) Lillehammer	4 x 5 km Relay C/F	Norway I Maiken Caspersen Falla; Ingvild Flugstad Østberg; Therese Johaug; Heidi Weng	Finland Krista Pärmäkoski; Kerttu Niskanen; Laura Mononen; Anne Kyllönen	United States Rosie Brennan; Sadie Bjornsen; Elizabeth Stephen; Jessie Diggins	
2	2	17 January 2016	(Slovenia) Planica	Team Sprint F	Sweden I Ida Ingemarsdotter; Stina Nilsson	Norway I Heidi Weng; Astrid Uhrenholdt Jacobsen	Germany I Sandra Ringwald; Hanna Kolb	
3	3	24 January 2016	(Czech Republic) Nové Město na Moravě	4 x 5 km Relay	Norway Ingvild Flugstad Østberg; Heidi Weng; Therese Johaug; Astrid Uhrenholdt Jacobsen	United States Sophie Caldwell; Sadie Bjornsen; Elizabeth Stephen; Jessie Diggins	Finland Anne Kyllönen; Krista Pärmäkoski; Riitta-Liisa Roponen; Kerttu Niskanen	

== Men's standings ==
=== Overall ===
Rank	after 36 events	Points
1	(Norway) Martin Johnsrud Sundby	2634
2	(Norway) Petter Northug	1602
3	(Norway) Finn Hågen Krogh	1584
4	(Russia) Sergey Ustiugov	1476
5	(France) Maurice Manificat	1131
6	(Norway) Niklas Dyrhaug	995
7	(Canada) Alex Harvey	889
8	(Norway) Emil Iversen	874
9	(Norway) Didrik Tønseth	871
10	(Norway) Hans Christer Holund	834

=== Distance ===
Rank	after 21 events	Points
1	(Norway) Martin Johnsrud Sundby	1444
2	(France) Maurice Manificat	763
3	(Norway) Niklas Dyrhaug	729
4	(Norway) Finn Hågen Krogh	614
5	(Russia) Sergey Ustiugov	605
6	(Norway) Didrik Tønseth	604
7	(Norway) Hans Christer Holund	572
8	(Norway) Petter Northug	526
9	(Russia) Maxim Vylegzhanin	488
10	(Russia) Alexander Legkov	480

=== Sprint ===
Rank	after 12 events	Points
1	(Italy) Federico Pellegrino	553
2	(Norway) Petter Northug	476
3	(Norway) Finn Hågen Krogh	414
4	(France) Baptiste Gros	324
5	(Norway) Eirik Brandsdal	307
6	(Russia) Sergey Ustiugov	294
7	(Norway) Ola Vigen Hattestad	291
8	(Norway) Sondre Turvoll Fossli	268
9	(Norway) Emil Iversen	244
10	(United States) Simeon Hamilton	222

=== Prize money ===
Rank	after 57 payouts	CHF
1	(Norway) Martin Johnsrud Sundby	407,200
2	(Russia) Sergey Ustiugov	159,250
3	(Norway) Petter Northug	144,750
4	(Norway) Finn Hågen Krogh	133,000
5	(France) Maurice Manificat	65,550
6	(Italy) Federico Pellegrino	62,750
7	(Norway) Niklas Dyrhaug	52,625
8	(Norway) Emil Iversen	37,250
9	(Italy) Francesco De Fabiani	34,624
10	(France) Baptiste Gros	30,000

=== Helvetia U23 ===
Rank	after 36 events	Points
1	(Italy) Francesco De Fabiani	717
2	(Norway) Sondre Turvoll Fossli	268
3	(France) Richard Jouve	174
4	(Sweden) Oskar Svensson	135
5	(Norway) Håvard Solås Taugbøl	108
6	(Norway) Simen Hegstad Krüger	81
7	(Switzerland) Roman Schaad	55
8	(Norway) Even Northug	44
9	(Russia) Aleksey Chervotkin	40
10	(France) Lucas Chanavat	35

=== Audi Quattro Bonus Ranking ===
Rank	after 19 events	Points
1	(Norway) Martin Johnsrud Sundby	608
2	(Russia) Sergey Ustiugov	386
3	(Norway) Petter Northug	368
4	(Norway) Finn Hågen Krogh	312
5	(Norway) Didrik Tønseth	264
6	(Norway) Emil Iversen	244
7	(Norway) Niklas Dyrhaug	236
8	(Italy) Federico Pellegrino	199
9	(France) Maurice Manificat	194
10	(Canada) Alex Harvey	172

== Women's standings ==
=== Overall ===
Rank	after 36 events	Points
1	(Norway) Therese Johaug	2681
2	(Norway) Ingvild Flugstad Østberg	2302
3	(Norway) Heidi Weng	2172
4	(Finland) Krista Pärmäkoski	1335
5	(Sweden) Charlotte Kalla	1217
6	(Norway) Maiken Caspersen Falla	1151
7	(Norway) Astrid Uhrenholdt Jacobsen	1142
8	(United States) Jessie Diggins	1128
9	(Finland) Kerttu Niskanen	1120
10	(Finland) Anne Kyllönen	1025

=== Distance ===
Rank	after 21 events	Points
1	(Norway) Therese Johaug	1533
2	(Norway) Heidi Weng	1145
3	(Norway) Ingvild Flugstad Østberg	976
4	(Sweden) Charlotte Kalla	730
5	(Finland) Krista Pärmäkoski	664
6	(Finland) Kerttu Niskanen	638
7	(Finland) Anne Kyllönen	602
8	(Norway) Astrid Uhrenholdt Jacobsen	555
9	(United States) Jessie Diggins	547
10	(Norway) Ragnhild Haga	470

=== Sprint ===
Rank	after 12 events	Points
1	(Norway) Maiken Caspersen Falla	726
2	(Norway) Ingvild Flugstad Østberg	646
3	(Sweden) Stina Nilsson	602
4	(Norway) Heidi Weng	409
5	(Norway) Astrid Uhrenholdt Jacobsen	355
6	(Sweden) Ida Ingemarsdotter	321
7	(United States) Sophie Caldwell	303
8	(United States) Jessie Diggins	297
9	(Finland) Krista Pärmäkoski	279
10	(Germany) Sandra Ringwald	248

=== Prize money ===
Rank	after 57 payouts	CHF
1	(Norway) Therese Johaug	430,700
2	(Norway) Ingvild Flugstad Østberg	236,750
3	(Norway) Heidi Weng	224,625
4	(Norway) Maiken Caspersen Falla	106,563
5	(Sweden) Stina Nilsson	91,749
6	(Norway) Astrid Uhrenholdt Jacobsen	63,500
7	(Finland) Krista Pärmäkoski	58,937
8	(Sweden) Charlotte Kalla	48,675
9	(United States) Jessie Diggins	46,500
10	(Finland) Kerttu Niskanen	36,125

=== Helvetia U23 ===
Rank	after 36 events	Points
1	(Sweden) Stina Nilsson	995
2	(Switzerland) Nathalie von Siebenthal	518
3	(Austria) Teresa Stadlober	486
4	(Czech Republic) Petra Novaková	322
5	(Russia) Yuliya Belorukova	125
6	(Slovenia) Anamarija Lampič	85
7	(Slovenia) Nika Razinger	68
8	(Russia) Daria Storozhilova	67
9	(Sweden) Jonna Sundling	56
10	(Switzerland) Nadine Fähndrich	44

=== Audi Quattro Bonus Ranking ===
Rank	after 19 events	Points
1	(Norway) Ingvild Flugstad Østberg	489
2	(Norway) Heidi Weng	470
3	(Norway) Therese Johaug	430
4	(Norway) Maiken Caspersen Falla	302
5	(Norway) Astrid Uhrenholdt Jacobsen	235
6	(Sweden) Stina Nilsson	231
7	(Sweden) Ida Ingemarsdotter	217
8	(Finland) Krista Pärmäkoski	207
9	(Sweden) Charlotte Kalla	198
10	(United States) Jessie Diggins	193

== Nations Cup ==
=== Overall ===
Rank	after 78 events	Points
1	Norway	24234
2	Russia	6743
3	Finland	6247
4	Sweden	6039
5	Germany	3532
6	United States	3525
7	France	2916
8	Italy	2549
9	Switzerland	2144
10	Canada	1659

=== Men ===
Rank	after 39 events	Points
1	Norway	12546
2	Russia	5689
3	France	2840
4	Italy	1913
5	Canada	1561
6	Finland	1516
7	Sweden	1368
8	Switzerland	1284
9	Germany	1024
10	Kazakhstan	830

=== Women ===
Rank	after 39 events	Points
1	Norway	11688
2	Finland	4731
3	Sweden	4671
4	United States	2908
5	Germany	2508
6	Russia	1054
7	Switzerland	860
8	Italy	636
9	Poland	598
10	Slovenia	579

== Achievements ==
New official FIS count from 2015/16 season. Only individual events.

First World Cup career victory

Men

- (Norway) Sondre Turvoll Fossli, 22, in his 6th season – the WC 1 (Sprint C) in Kuusamo; first podium was 2014-15 WC 1 (Sprint C) in Ruka
- (Norway) Niklas Dyrhaug, 28, in his 7th season – the WC 1 (15 km C Pursuit) in Ruka; also first podium
- (Norway) Emil Iversen, 24, in his 3rd season – the WC 7 (Sprint C) in Oberstdorf; also first podium
- (France) Baptiste Gros, 25, in his 6th season – the WC 17 (Sprint F) in Quebec City; first podium was 2013-14 WC 8 (Sprint F) in Szklarska Poręba

Women

- (Sweden) Stina Nilsson, 22, in her 5th season – the WC 4 (Sprint F) in Davos; first podium was 2013-14 WC 14 (Sprint C) in Drammen
- (United States) Sophie Caldwell, 25, in her 4th season – the WC 7 (Sprint C) in Oberstdorf; first podium was 2013-14 WC 12 (Sprint F) in Lahti
- (United States) Jessie Diggins, 24, in her 6th season – the WC 7 (5 km F) in Toblach; also first podium
- (Norway) Heidi Weng, 24, in her 7th season – the WC 7 (10 km C Mass Start) in Val di Fiemme; first podium was 2011-12 WC 18 (15 km Skiathlon) in Lahti
- (Finland) Krista Pärmäkoski, 25, in her 8th season – the WC 17 (10 km C Pursuit) in Canmore; first podium was 2010-11 WC 11 (10 km C Handicap start) in Oberhof

First World Cup podium

Men

- (Norway) Niklas Dyrhaug, 28, in his 7th season – no. 1 in the WC 1 (15 km C Pursuit) in Ruka
- (Norway) Hans Christer Holund, 26, in his 8th season – no. 3 in the WC 2 (30 km Skiathlon) in Lillehammer
- (United Kingdom) Andrew Young, 23, in his 8th season – no. 3 in the WC 5 (Sprint F) in Toblach
- (Norway) Emil Iversen, 24, in his 3rd season – no. 1 in the WC 7 (Sprint C) in Oberstdorf
- (France) Robin Duvillard, 32, in his 13th season – no. 2 in the WC 7 (9 km Pursuit climb) in Val di Fiemme

Women

- (United States) Jessie Diggins, 24, in her 6th season – no. 1 in the WC 7 (5 km F) in Toblach

Victories in this World Cup (all-time number of victories as of 2015/16 season in parentheses)

Men

- (Norway) Martin Johnsrud Sundby, 14 (26) first places
- (Italy) Federico Pellegrino, 5 (8) first places
- (Russia) Sergey Ustiugov, 3 (4) first places
- (Norway) Emil Iversen, 3 (3) first places
- (France) Maurice Manificat, 2 (6) first places
- (Norway) Petter Northug, 1 (36) first place
- (Kazakhstan) Alexey Poltoranin, 1 (9) first place
- (Russia) Maxim Vylegzhanin, 1 (7) first place
- (Norway) Finn Hågen Krogh, 1 (7) first place
- (Russia) Nikita Kryukov, 1 (5) first place
- (Finland) Matti Heikkinen, 1 (3) first place
- (Norway) Sondre Turvoll Fossli, 1 (1) first place
- (Norway) Niklas Dyrhaug, 1 (1) first place
- (France) Baptiste Gros, 1 (1) first place

Women

- (Norway) Therese Johaug, 17 (42) first places
- (Norway) Maiken Caspersen Falla, 8 (12) first places
- (Sweden) Stina Nilsson, 3 (3) first places
- (Norway) Heidi Weng, 3 (3) first places
- (Norway) Ingvild Flugstad Østberg, 2 (5) first places
- (United States) Sophie Caldwell, 1 (1) first place
- (United States) Jessie Diggins, 1 (1) first place
- (Finland) Krista Pärmäkoski, 1 (1) first place

== Retirements ==
Following are notable cross-country skiers who announced their retirement:

Men

- Ivan Babikov (CAN)
- Roland Clara (ITA)
- Jesper Modin (SWE)
- Eldar Rønning (NOR)

Women

- Maria Rydqvist (SWE)
