= 2020–21 FIS Cross-Country Continental Cup =

Discipline	Men	Women
Alpen Cup	(France) Arnaud Chautemps	(Germany) Lisa Lohmann
Balkan Cup	(Romania) Paul Constantin Pepene	(Croatia) Tena Hadžić
Eastern Europe Cup	(Russia) Andrey Larkov	(Russia) Lilia Vasilieva
Far East Cup	(South Korea) Kim Eun-ho	(South Korea) Lee Chae-won
Slavic Cup	(Czech Republic) Petr Knop	(Poland) Karolina Kaleta

Competition

The 2020–21 FIS Cross-Country Continental Cup (COC) was a season of the FIS Cross-Country Continental Cup, a series of second-level cross-country skiing competitions arranged by the International Ski Federation (FIS).

The 2020–21 Continental Cup contained originally nine different series of geographically restricted competitions; five in Europe, two in North America and one each from Asia and Oceania. Two tournament in North America and Canada (US Super Tour and Nor-Am Cup), one tournament in Europe (Scandinavian Cup) and the tournament from Oceania (Australia/New Zealand Cup) were cancelled due to COVID-19 pandemic.

== Winners ==
The overall winners from the 2020–21 season's Continental Cups are rewarded a right to start in the first period in the following 2021–22 World Cup season.

Cup	Abbr.	Men			Women		
Cup	Abbr.	Winner	Second	Third	Winner	Second	Third
Alpen Cup (or OPA Cup)	OPA	(France) Arnaud Chautemps	(France) Renaud Jay	(Germany) Friedrich Moch	(Germany) Lisa Lohmann	(Switzerland) Désirée Steiner	(Germany) Coletta Rydzek
Balkan Cup	BC	(Romania) Paul Constantin Pepene	(Bosnia and Herzegovina) Strahinja Erić	(Romania) Petrică Hogiu	(Croatia) Tena Hadžić	(Romania) Tímea Lőrincz	(Serbia) Ana Ilić
Eastern Europe Cup	EEC	(Russia) Andrey Larkov	(Russia) Anton Timashov	(Russia) Andrey Krasnov	(Russia) Lilia Vasilieva	(Belarus) Anastasia Kirillova (Russia) Anastasia Moskalenko	—N/a
Far East Cup	FEC	(South Korea) Kim Eun-ho	(South Korea) Lee Geon-yong	(South Korea) Lee Jin-bok	(South Korea) Lee Chae-won	(South Korea) Han Da-som (South Korea) Lee Eui-jin	—N/a
Slavic Cup	SC	(Czech Republic) Petr Knop	(Romania) Paul Constantin Pepene	(Romania) Petrică Hogiu	(Poland) Karolina Kaleta	(Slovakia) Alena Procházková	(Latvia) Patricija Eiduka
Scandinavian Cup	SCAN	cancelled due to COVID-19					
Nor-Am Cup	NAC	cancelled due to COVID-19					
US Super Tour	UST	cancelled due to COVID-19					
Australia/New Zealand Cup	ANC	cancelled due to COVID-19					

== Results ==
=== Men ===
==== Alpen Cup ====
Key: C – Classic / F – Freestyle
Stage	Date	Place	Discipline	Winner	Second	Third
1	5 December 2020	(Switzerland) Ulrichen	Sprint F	(Russia) Artem Maltsev	(Russia) Alexander Terentev	(Switzerland) Janik Riebli
2	6 December 2020	(Switzerland) Ulrichen	15 km F	(Russia) Artem Maltsev	(Russia) Denis Spitsov	(Austria) Mika Vermeulen
	18 December 2020	(Italy) Valdidentro	Sprint C	moved to Formazza, Italy on the same dates		
	19 December 2020	(Italy) Valdidentro	15 km C	moved to Formazza, Italy on the same dates		
	20 December 2020	(Italy) Valdidentro	20 km F Mass Start	moved to Formazza, Italy on the same dates		
	18 December 2020	(Italy) Formazza	Sprint C	cancelled		
3	19 December 2020	(Italy) Formazza	15 km C	(Spain) Imanol Rojo	(Andorra) Irineu Esteve Altimiras	(Switzerland) Ueli Schnider
4	20 December 2020	(Italy) Formazza	20 km F Mass Start	(France) Adrien Backscheider	(Italy) Mirco Bertolina	(Andorra) Irineu Esteve Altimiras
5	6 March 2021	(France) Premanon	15 km F	(France) Gérard Agnellet	(France) Renaud Jay	(Switzerland) Cédric Steiner
6	7 March 2021	(France) Premanon	15 km C (low total climb)	(Switzerland) Cédric Steiner	(France) Gérard Agnellet	(France) Martin Collet
7	12 March 2021	(Slovenia) Pokljuka	Sprint F	(France) Lucas Chanavat	(France) Renaud Jay	(France) Arnaud Chautemps
8	13 March 2021	(Slovenia) Pokljuka	15 km C	(Germany) Andreas Katz	(Germany) Friedrich Moch	(France) Arnaud Chautemps
9	14 March 2021	(Slovenia) Pokljuka	15 km F Pursuit	(Germany) Friedrich Moch	(France) Arnaud Chautemps	(Germany) Andreas Katz
	20 March 2021	(Germany) Oberwiesenthal	Sprint F	cancelled		
	21 March 2021	(Germany) Oberwiesenthal	20 km F	cancelled		

==== Balkan Cup ====
Key: C – Classic / F – Freestyle
Stage	Date	Place	Discipline	Winner	Second	Third
1	16 January 2021	(Croatia) Ravna Gora	10 km C	(Romania) Paul Constantin Pepene	(Romania) Petrică Hogiu	(Romania) Raul Mihai Popa
	17 January 2021	(Croatia) Ravna Gora	1,3 km F	cancelled		
2	17 January 2021	(Croatia) Ravna Gora	Sprint F	(Romania) Raul Mihai Popa	(Romania) Paul Constantin Pepene	(Bosnia and Herzegovina) Strahinja Erić
3	30 January 2021	(Serbia) Zlatibor	10 km C	(Romania) Paul Constantin Pepene	(Romania) Petrică Hogiu	(Argentina) Franco Dal Farra
	31 January 2021	(Serbia) Zlatibor	Sprint F	cancelled		
4	3 February 2021	(North Macedonia) Mavrovo	10 km F	(Croatia) Krešimir Crnković	(Bosnia and Herzegovina) Strahinja Erić	(Turkey) Hamza Dursun
5	4 February 2021	(North Macedonia) Mavrovo	10 km F	(Croatia) Krešimir Crnković	(Turkey) Hamza Dursun	(Bulgaria) Daniel Peshkov
	6 February 2021	(Greece) Pigadia	10 km F	cancelled		
	7 February 2021	(Greece) Pigadia	10 km F	cancelled		
6	19 February 2021	(Bosnia and Herzegovina) Dvorišta-Pale	10 km F	(Croatia) Krešimir Crnković	(Argentina) Franco Dal Farra	(Bosnia and Herzegovina) Strahinja Erić
7	20 February 2021	(Bosnia and Herzegovina) Dvorišta-Pale	10 km F	(Croatia) Krešimir Crnković	(Bosnia and Herzegovina) Strahinja Erić	(Argentina) Franco Dal Farra
8	13 March 2021	(Romania) Fundata	10 km C	(Romania) Paul Constantin Pepene	(Romania) Petrică Hogiu	(Romania) Raul Mihai Popa
9	14 March 2021	(Romania) Fundata	10 km F	(Romania) Paul Constantin Pepene	(Romania) Petrică Hogiu	(Romania) Raul Mihai Popa
10	18 March 2021	(Turkey) Bolu-Gerede	10 km C	(Romania) Paul Constantin Pepene	(Estonia) Martin Himma	(Romania) Raul Mihai Popa
11	19 March 2021	(Turkey) Bolu-Gerede	10 km F	(Romania) Paul Constantin Pepene	(Romania) Petrică Hogiu	(Estonia) Martin Himma
12	20 March 2021	(Turkey) Bolu-Gerede	Sprint F	(Romania) Paul Constantin Pepene	(Romania) Raul Mihai Popa	(Romania) Petrică Hogiu

==== Eastern Europe Cup ====
Key: C – Classic / F – Freestyle
Stage	Date	Place	Discipline	Winner	Second	Third
1	28 November 2020	(Russia) Vershina Tea	Sprint F	(Russia) Denis Filimonov	(Russia) Andrey Krasnov	(Russia) Ivan Gorbunov
2	29 November 2020	(Russia) Vershina Tea	15 km C	(Russia) Ivan Kirillov	(Russia) Stanislav Volzhentsev	(Russia) Artem Nikolaev
3	1 December 2020	(Russia) Vershina Tea	Sprint C	(Russia) Andrey Kuznetsov	(Russia) Andrey Krasnov	(Russia) Vladislav Vechkanov
4	2 December 2020	(Russia) Vershina Tea	15 km F	(Russia) Artem Nikolaev	(Russia) Ivan Kirillov	(Russia) Andrey Larkov
5	23 December 2020	(Russia) Krasnogorsk	Sprint F	(Russia) Denis Filimonov	(Russia) Andrey Krasnov	(Russia) Andrey Parfenov
6	24 December 2020	(Russia) Krasnogorsk	Sprint C	(Russia) Sergey Ardashev	(Russia) Anton Timashov	(Russia) Denis Filimonov
7	26 December 2020	(Russia) Krasnogorsk	15 km F	(Russia) Dmitry Bagrashov	(Russia) Anton Timashov	(Russia) Artem Nikolaev
8	27 December 2020	(Russia) Krasnogorsk	15 km C	(Russia) Ilia Poroshkin	(Russia) Sergey Ardashev	(Russia) Andrey Larkov
9	4 January 2021	(Belarus) Minsk-Raubichi	Sprint C	(Russia) Anton Timashov	(Russia) Andrey Krasnov	(Russia) Andrey Larkov
10	5 January 2021	(Belarus) Minsk-Raubichi	10 km C	(Russia) Andrey Larkov	(Russia) Anton Timashov	(Russia) Artem Nikolaev
11	7 January 2021	(Belarus) Minsk-Raubichi	10 km F	(Russia) Anton Timashov	(Russia) Artem Nikolaev	(Russia) Andrey Larkov
12	22 January 2021	(Russia) Krasnogorsk	Sprint F	(Russia) Andrey Krasnov	(Russia) Fedor Nazarov	(Russia) Anton Timashov
13	5 February 2021	(Russia) Krasnogorsk	15 km C	(Russia) Andrey Larkov	(Russia) Ilia Poroshkin	(Russia) Raul Shakirzianov
14	7 February 2021	(Russia) Krasnogorsk	Sprint F	(Russia) Andrey Krasnov	(Russia) Andrey Larkov	(Russia) Iliya Tikhonenko
15	11 February 2021	(Kazakhstan) Almaty-Soldier Hollow	Sprint C	(Russia) Anton Timashov	(Russia) Artem Nikolaev	(Russia) Ivan Kirillov
16	12 February 2021	(Kazakhstan) Almaty-Soldier Hollow	15 km C Individual	(Russia) Artem Nikolaev	(Russia) Andrey Larkov	(Russia) Anton Timashov
17	13 February 2021	(Kazakhstan) Almaty-Soldier Hollow	20 km F Mass Start	(Russia) Ivan Kirillov	(Russia) Andrey Larkov	(Russia) Anton Timashov
18	27 February 2021	(Russia) Syktyvkar	15 km C	(Russia) Ilia Poroshkin	(Russia) Ermil Vokuev	(Russia) Anton Timashov
19	28 February 2021	(Russia) Syktyvkar	Sprint F	(Russia) Fedor Nazarov	(Russia) Ermil Vokuev	(Russia) Ivan Gorbunov
20	3 March 2021	(Russia) Syktyvkar	Skiathlon 15 km C/F	(Russia) Anton Timashov	(Russia) Andrey Larkov	(Russia) Sergey Ardashev

==== Far East Cup ====
Key: C – Classic / F – Freestyle
Stage	Date	Place	Discipline	Winner	Second	Third
	19 December 2020	(South Korea) Pyeongchang	10 km C	cancelled		
	20 December 2020	(South Korea) Pyeongchang	10 km F	cancelled		
	26 December 2020	(Japan) Otoineppu	10 km C	cancelled		
	27 December 2020	(Japan) Otoineppu	10 km F	cancelled		
	6 January 2021	(Japan) Sapporo	Sprint F	cancelled		
	7 January 2021	(Japan) Sapporo	10 km C	cancelled		
	8 January 2021	(Japan) Sapporo	15 km F Pursuit	cancelled		
1	3 February 2021	(South Korea) Pyeongchang	10 km C	(South Korea) Lee Jin-bok	(South Korea) Lee Geon-yong	(South Korea) Jeong Jong-won
2	4 February 2021	(South Korea) Pyeongchang	10 km F	(South Korea) Kim Eun-ho	(South Korea) Kim Min-woo	(South Korea) Lee Geon-yong
3	13 February 2021	(Japan) Shiramine	15 km C	(Japan) Takatsugu Uda	(Japan) Takahiro Suzuki	(Japan) Masato Tanaka

==== Slavic Cup ====
Key: C – Classic / F – Freestyle
Stage	Date	Place	Discipline	Winner	Second	Third
	19 December 2020	(Poland) Zakopane	10 km C	cancelled, moved to Wisła-Kubalonka		
1	19 December 2020	(Poland) Zakopane	10 km C	(Romania) Paul Constantin Pepene	(Czech Republic) Adam Fellner	(Romania) Petrică Hogiu
2	20 December 2020	(Poland) Zakopane	15 km F	(Czech Republic) Petr Knop	(Romania) Petrică Hogiu	(Romania) Paul Constantin Pepene
	29 December 2020	(Slovakia) Štrbské Pleso	Sprint F	cancelled		
	30 December 2020	(Slovakia) Štrbské Pleso	10 km F	cancelled		
	20 February 2021	(Slovakia) Štrbské Pleso	Sprint C	cancelled		
	21 February 2021	(Slovakia) Štrbské Pleso	15 km C	cancelled		
	20 March 2021	(Poland) Wisła-Kubalonka	Sprint F	cancelled, moved to Zakopane		
	21 March 2021	(Poland) Wisła-Kubalonka	15 km F	cancelled, moved to Zakopane		
3	20 March 2021	(Poland) Zakopane	Sprint C	(Czech Republic) Tomáš Kalivoda	(Czech Republic) Tomáš Lukeš	(Poland) Maciej Staręga
4	21 March 2021	(Poland) Zakopane	30 km Mass Start F	(Czech Republic) Petr Knop	(Poland) Dominik Bury	(Czech Republic) Vladimír Kozlovský
	27 March 2021	(Slovakia) Kremnica-Skalka	10 km C	cancelled		
	28 March 2021	(Slovakia) Kremnica-Skalka	10 km F	cancelled		

==== Scandinavian Cup ====
Key: C – Classic / F – Freestyle
Stage	Date	Place	Discipline	Winner	Second	Third
	12 December 2020	(Finland) Rovaniemi	Sprint F	cancelled		
	13 December 2020	(Finland) Rovaniemi	15 km F	cancelled		
	5 March 2021	(Latvia) Madona	Sprint F	cancelled		
	6 March 2021	(Latvia) Madona	15 km C Mass Start	cancelled		
	7 March 2021	(Latvia) Madona	15 km F Pursuit	cancelled		

==== US Super Tour ====
Key: C – Classic / F – Freestyle
Stage	Date	Place	Discipline	Winner	Second	Third
	11 December 2020	(United States) Sun Valley	10 km C	cancelled		
	12 December 2020	(United States) Sun Valley	Sprint C	cancelled		
	13 December 2020	(United States) Sun Valley	15 km F Mass Start	cancelled		
	27 February 2021	(United States) Cable-Hayward	50 km F Mass Start	cancelled		

==== Nor-Am Cup ====
Key: C – Classic / F – Freestyle
Stage	Date	Place	Discipline	Winner	Second	Third
	7 January 2021	(Canada) Whistler	Sprint C	cancelled		
	9 January 2021	(Canada) Whistler	10 km F	cancelled		
	10 January 2021	(Canada) Whistler	30 km C Mass Start	cancelled		

=== Women ===
==== Alpen Cup ====
Key: C – Classic / F – Freestyle
Stage	Date	Place	Discipline	Winner	Second	Third
1	5 December 2020	(Switzerland) Ulrichen	Sprint F	(Switzerland) Nadine Fähndrich	(Germany) Antonia Fräbel	(Russia) Alisa Zhambalova
2	6 December 2020	(Switzerland) Ulrichen	10 km F	(Italy) Francesca Franchi	(Russia) Anna Nechaevskaya	(Germany) Antonia Fräbel
	18 December 2020	(Italy) Valdidentro	Sprint C	moved to Formazza, Italy on the same dates		
	19 December 2020	(Italy) Valdidentro	10 km C	moved to Formazza, Italy on the same dates		
	20 December 2020	(Italy) Valdidentro	15 km F Mass Start	moved to Formazza, Italy on the same dates		
	18 December 2020	(Italy) Formazza	Sprint C	cancelled		
3	19 December 2020	(Italy) Formazza	10 km C	(Italy) Anna Comarella	(Italy) Martina Di Centa	(Italy) Sara Pellegrini
4	20 December 2020	(Italy) Formazza	15 km F Mass Start	(Italy) Ilaria Debertolis	(Italy) Ilenia Defrancesco	(Italy) Anna Comarella
5	6 March 2021	(France) Premanon	10 km F	(France) Coralie Bentz	(Germany) Lisa Lohmann	(Germany) Kim Hager
6	7 March 2021	(France) Premanon	10 km C (low total climb)	(France) Coralie Bentz	(Germany) Lisa Lohmann	(Germany) Julia Preussger
7	12 March 2021	(Slovenia) Pokljuka	Sprint F	(Germany) Coletta Rydzek	(France) Enora Latuillière	(Switzerland) Alina Meier
8	13 March 2021	(Slovenia) Pokljuka	10 km C	(Germany) Katherine Sauerbrey	(Germany) Lisa Lohmann	(Germany) Coletta Rydzek
9	14 March 2021	(Slovenia) Pokljuka	10 km F Pursuit	(Germany) Lisa Lohmann	(Germany) Katherine Sauerbrey	(Switzerland) Lydia Hiernickel
	20 March 2021	(Germany) Oberwiesenthal	Sprint F	cancelled		
	21 March 2021	(Germany) Oberwiesenthal	15 km F	cancelled		

==== Balkan Cup ====
Key: C – Classic / F – Freestyle
Stage	Date	Place	Discipline	Winner	Second	Third
1	16 January 2021	(Croatia) Ravna Gora	5 km C	(Croatia) Vedrana Malec	(Croatia) Tena Hadžić	(Romania) Tímea Lőrincz
	17 January 2021	(Croatia) Ravna Gora	1,3 km F	cancelled		
2	17 January 2021	(Croatia) Ravna Gora	Sprint F	(Croatia) Nina Jagenić	(Croatia) Tena Hadžić	(Romania) Tímea Lőrincz
3	30 January 2021	(Serbia) Zlatibor	5 km C	(Russia) Varvara Prokhorova	(Croatia) Tena Hadžić	(Romania) Tímea Lőrincz
	31 January 2021	(Serbia) Zlatibor	Sprint F	cancelled		
4	3 February 2021	(North Macedonia) Mavrovo	5 km F	(Croatia) Vedrana Malec	(Croatia) Anika Kožica	(Russia) Varvara Prokhorova
5	4 February 2021	(North Macedonia) Mavrovo	5 km F	(Croatia) Vedrana Malec	(Russia) Varvara Prokhorova	(Croatia) Anika Kožica
	6 February 2021	(Greece) Pigadia	5 km F	cancelled		
	7 February 2021	(Greece) Pigadia	5 km F	cancelled		
6	19 February 2021	(Bosnia and Herzegovina) Dvorišta-Pale	5 km F	(Croatia) Anika Kožica	(Croatia) Nika Blaženić	(Croatia) Tena Hadžić
7	20 February 2021	(Bosnia and Herzegovina) Dvorišta-Pale	5 km F	(Croatia) Tena Hadžić	(Slovenia) Anita Klemenčič	(Croatia) Anika Kožica
8	13 March 2021	(Romania) Fundata	5 km C	(Romania) Tímea Lőrincz	(Serbia) Ana Ilić	(Croatia) Tena Hadžić
9	14 March 2021	(Romania) Fundata	5 km F	(Romania) Tímea Lőrincz	(Croatia) Tena Hadžić	(Serbia) Maida Drndić
10	18 March 2021	(Turkey) Bolu-Gerede	5 km C	(Estonia) Kaidy Kaasiku	(Estonia) Keidy Kaasiku	(Estonia) Hanna-Brita Kaasik
11	19 March 2021	(Turkey) Bolu-Gerede	5 km F	(Estonia) Kaidy Kaasiku	(Estonia) Keidy Kaasiku	(Estonia) Hanna-Brita Kaasik
12	20 March 2021	(Turkey) Bolu-Gerede	Sprint F	(Estonia) Kaidy Kaasiku	(Estonia) Keidy Kaasiku	(Romania) Tímea Lőrincz

==== Eastern Europe Cup ====
Key: C – Classic / F – Freestyle
Stage	Date	Place	Discipline	Winner	Second	Third
1	28 November 2020	(Russia) Vershina Tea	Sprint F	(Russia) Marina Chernousova	(Russia) Anna Grukhvina	(Russia) Veronika Stepanova
2	29 November 2020	(Russia) Vershina Tea	10 km C	(Russia) Lilia Vasilieva	(Russia) Anastasiya Faleeva	(Russia) Alija Iksanova
3	1 December 2020	(Russia) Vershina Tea	Sprint C	(Russia) Anastasiya Faleeva	(Belarus) Anastasia Kirillova	(Russia) Olga Tsareva
4	2 December 2020	(Russia) Vershina Tea	10 km F	(Russia) Lilia Vasilieva	(Russia) Marina Chernousova	(Russia) Olga Zholudeva
5	23 December 2020	(Russia) Krasnogorsk	Sprint F	(Belarus) Anastasia Kirillova	(Russia) Olga Kucheruk	(Russia) Nina Dubotolkina
6	24 December 2020	(Russia) Krasnogorsk	Sprint C	(Russia) Olga Tsareva	(Russia) Alena Baranova	(Russia) Anastasia Moskalenko
7	26 December 2020	(Russia) Krasnogorsk	10 km F	(Russia) Ekaterina Smirnova	(Russia) Evgeniya Krupitskaya	(Russia) Anastasia Rygalina
8	27 December 2020	(Russia) Krasnogorsk	10 km C	(Russia) Nataliya Mekruykova	(Russia) Alija Iksanova	(Russia) Ekaterina Smirnova
9	4 January 2021	(Belarus) Minsk-Raubichi	Sprint C	(Belarus) Anastasia Kirillova	(Russia) Lilia Vasilieva	(Russia) Anastasia Moskalenko
10	5 January 2021	(Belarus) Minsk-Raubichi	5 km C	(Belarus) Anastasia Kirillova	(Russia) Lilia Vasilieva	(Russia) Anastasia Moskalenko
11	7 January 2021	(Belarus) Minsk-Raubichi	5 km F	(Russia) Lilia Vasilieva	(Belarus) Anastasia Kirillova	(Russia) Anastasia Moskalenko
12	22 January 2021	(Russia) Krasnogorsk	Sprint F	(Belarus) Anastasia Kirillova	(Russia) Anastasia Moskalenko	(Russia) Elizaveta Shalaboda
13	5 February 2021	(Russia) Krasnogorsk	10 km C	(Russia) Lidia Durkina	(Russia) Lilia Vasilieva	(Russia) Diana Golovan
14	7 February 2021	(Russia) Krasnogorsk	Sprint F	(Russia) Elizaveta Shalaboda	(Russia) Daria Storozhilova	(Russia) Lilia Vasilieva
15	11 February 2021	(Kazakhstan) Almaty-Soldier Hollow	Sprint C	(Russia) Lilia Vasilieva	(Kazakhstan) Anna Shevchenko	(Russia) Anastasia Moskalenko
16	12 February 2021	(Kazakhstan) Almaty-Soldier Hollow	10 km C Individual	(Russia) Lilia Vasilieva	(Kazakhstan) Anna Shevchenko	(Kazakhstan) Tamara Ebel
17	13 February 2021	(Kazakhstan) Almaty-Soldier Hollow	15 km F Mass Start	(Russia) Lilia Vasilieva	(Kazakhstan) Anna Shevchenko	(Russia) Anastasia Moskalenko
18	27 February 2021	(Russia) Syktyvkar	10 km C	(Russia) Alija Iksanova	(Russia) Nataliya Mekryukova	(Russia) Ekaterina Smirnova
19	28 February 2021	(Russia) Syktyvkar	Sprint F	(Russia) Anna Grukhvina	(Russia) Marina Chernousova	(Russia) Kristina Kuskova
20	3 March 2021	(Russia) Syktyvkar	Skiathlon 10 km C/F	(Russia) Ekaterina Smirnova	(Russia) Diana Golovan	(Russia) Larisa Ryasina

==== Far East Cup ====
Key: C – Classic / F – Freestyle
Stage	Date	Place	Discipline	Winner	Second	Third
	19 December 2020	(South Korea) Pyeongchang	5 km C	cancelled		
	20 December 2020	(South Korea) Pyeongchang	5 km F	cancelled		
	26 December 2020	(Japan) Otoineppu	5 km C	cancelled		
	27 December 2020	(Japan) Otoineppu	5 km F	cancelled		
	6 January 2021	(Japan) Sapporo	Sprint F	cancelled		
	7 January 2021	(Japan) Sapporo	5 km C	cancelled		
	8 January 2021	(Japan) Sapporo	10 km F Pursuit	cancelled		
1	3 February 2021	(South Korea) Pyeongchang	5 km C	(South Korea) Lee Chae-won	(South Korea) Lee Eui-jin	(South Korea) Han Da-som
2	4 February 2021	(South Korea) Pyeongchang	5 km F	(South Korea) Lee Chae-won	(South Korea) Han Da-som	(South Korea) Lee Eui-jin
3	13 February 2021	(Japan) Shiramine	10 km C	(Japan) Rin Sobue	(Japan) Nao Maita	(Japan) Kozue Takizawa

==== Slavic Cup ====
Key: C – Classic / F – Freestyle
Stage	Date	Place	Discipline	Winner	Second	Third
	19 December 2020	(Poland) Zakopane	5 km C	cancelled, moved to Wisła-Kubalonka		
1	19 December 2020	(Poland) Zakopane	5 km C	(Latvia) Patrīcija Eiduka	(Poland) Karolina Kaleta	(Poland) Eliza Rucka
2	20 December 2020	(Poland) Zakopane	10 km F	(Latvia) Patrīcija Eiduka	(Poland) Karolina Kaleta	(Poland) Eliza Rucka
	29 December 2020	(Slovakia) Štrbské Pleso	Sprint F	cancelled		
	30 December 2020	(Slovakia) Štrbské Pleso	7,5 km F	cancelled		
	20 February 2021	(Slovakia) Štrbské Pleso	Sprint C	cancelled		
	21 February 2021	(Slovakia) Štrbské Pleso	10 km C	cancelled		
	20 March 2021	(Poland) Wisła-Kubalonka	Sprint F	cancelled, moved to Zakopane		
	21 March 2021	(Poland) Wisła-Kubalonka	7,5 km F	cancelled, moved to Zakopane		
3	20 March 2021	(Poland) Zakopane	Sprint C	(Slovakia) Alena Procházková	(Poland) Monika Skinder	(Poland) Izabela Marcisz
4	21 March 2021	(Poland) Zakopane	15 km Mass Start F	(Slovakia) Alena Procházková	(Czech Republic) Sandra Schützová	(Poland) Monika Skinder
	27 March 2021	(Slovakia) Kremnica-Skalka	5 km C	cancelled		
	28 March 2021	(Slovakia) Kremnica-Skalka	5 km F	cancelled		

==== Scandinavian Cup ====
Key: C – Classic / F – Freestyle
Stage	Date	Place	Discipline	Winner	Second	Third
	12 December 2020	(Finland) Rovaniemi	Sprint F	cancelled		
	13 December 2020	(Finland) Rovaniemi	10 km F	cancelled		
	5 March 2021	(Latvia) Madona	Sprint F	cancelled		
	6 March 2021	(Latvia) Madona	10 km C Mass Start	cancelled		
	7 March 2021	(Latvia) Madona	10 km F Pursuit	cancelled		

==== US Super Tour ====
Key: C – Classic / F – Freestyle
Stage	Date	Place	Discipline	Winner	Second	Third
	11 December 2020	(United States) Sun Valley	5 km C	cancelled		
	12 December 2020	(United States) Sun Valley	Sprint C	cancelled		
	13 December 2020	(United States) Sun Valley	10 km F Mass Start	cancelled		
	27 February 2021	(United States) Cable-Hayward	30 km F Mass Start	cancelled		

==== Nor-Am Cup ====
Key: C – Classic / F – Freestyle
Stage	Date	Place	Discipline	Winner	Second	Third
	7 January 2021	(Canada) Whistler	Sprint C	cancelled		
	9 January 2021	(Canada) Whistler	5 km F	cancelled		
	10 January 2021	(Canada) Whistler	15 km C Mass Start	cancelled		

== Sources ==
"RULES FOR THE FIS CROSS-COUNTRY CONTINENTAL CUP" (PDF). fis-ski.com. International Ski Federation.
