= 2019 FIS Cross-Country Balkan Cup =

Season of cross-country skiing

Discipline	Men	Women
Overall	(Bosnia and Herzegovina) Strahinja Erić	(Croatia) Vedrana Malec

Competition
Locations	6 venues	6 venues
Individual	11 events	11 events
Cancelled	5 events	5 events

The 2019 FIS Cross-Country Balkan Cup was a season of the FIS Cross-Country Balkan Cup, a Continental Cup season in cross-country skiing for men and women. The season began on 12 January 2019 in Ravna Gora, Croatia and concluded on 1–3 March 2019 in Gerede, Turkey.

== Calendar ==
=== Men ===
Key: C – Classic / F – Freestyle
Period	Race	Date	Place	Discipline	Winner	Second	Third	Ref.
I		12 January 2019	(Croatia) Ravna Gora	10 km C	Cancelled			
I		13 January 2019	(Croatia) Ravna Gora	Sprint F	Cancelled			
II	1	2 February 2019	(Greece) Pigadia	10 km F	(Bulgaria) Martin Penchev	(Greece) Apostolos Angelis	(Bulgaria) Todor Malchov	
II	2	3 February 2019	(Greece) Pigadia	10 km F	(Bulgaria) Martin Penchev	(Bulgaria) Aleksandar Ognyanov	(Bulgaria) Todor Malchov	
III	3	9 February 2019	(Serbia) Sjenica	10 km F	(Bosnia and Herzegovina) Strahinja Erić	(Bosnia and Herzegovina) Stefan Anić	(Bosnia and Herzegovina) Miloš Čolić	
III	4	10 February 2019	(Serbia) Sjenica	10 km F	(Bosnia and Herzegovina) Strahinja Erić	(Bosnia and Herzegovina) Stefan Anić	(Serbia) Rejhan Šmrković	
III		13 February 2019	(North Macedonia) Mavrovo	10 km F	Cancelled			
III	5	14 February 2019	(North Macedonia) Mavrovo	10 km F	(Croatia) Edi Dadić	(Bulgaria) Martin Penchev	(Bosnia and Herzegovina) Strahinja Erić	
IV	6	2 March 2019	(Croatia) Ravna Gora	10 km C	(Austria) Tobias Habenicht	(Slovenia) Gal Gros	(Hungary) Ádám Kónya	
IV	7	3 March 2019	(Croatia) Ravna Gora	10 km F	(Austria) Tobias Habenicht	(Croatia) Edi Dadić	(Bosnia and Herzegovina) Strahinja Erić	
IV	8	9 March 2019	(Bosnia and Herzegovina) Dvorišta	10 km F	(Croatia) Edi Dadić	(Bosnia and Herzegovina) Strahinja Erić	(Hungary) Ádám Kónya	
IV	9	10 March 2019	(Bosnia and Herzegovina) Dvorišta	15 km F	(Croatia) Edi Dadić	(Serbia) Rejhan Šmrković	(Luxembourg) Kari Peters	
IV		17 March 2019	(Bulgaria) Borovets	10 km C	Cancelled			
IV		18 March 2019	(Bulgaria) Borovets	10 km F	Cancelled			
IV	10	23 March 2019	(Turkey) Gerede	10 km C	(Romania) Paul Constantin Pepene	(Romania) Petrică Hogiu	(Romania) Raul Mihai Popa	
IV	11	24 March 2019	(Turkey) Gerede	15 km F	(Romania) Petrică Hogiu	(Romania) Paul Constantin Pepene	(Romania) Raul Mihai Popa	

=== Women ===
Key: C – Classic / F – Freestyle
Period	Race	Date	Place	Discipline	Winner	Second	Third	Ref.
I		12 January 2019	(Croatia) Ravna Gora	5 km C	Cancelled			
I		13 January 2019	(Croatia) Ravna Gora	Sprint F	Cancelled			
II	1	2 February 2019	(Greece) Pigadia	5 km F	(Croatia) Vedrana Malec	(Greece) Maria Ntanou	(Bosnia and Herzegovina) Sanja Kusmuk	
II	2	3 February 2019	(Greece) Pigadia	5 km F	(Croatia) Vedrana Malec	(Greece) Maria Ntanou	(Serbia) Anja Ilić	
III	3	9 February 2019	(Serbia) Sjenica	5 km F	(Bosnia and Herzegovina) Sanja Kusmuk	(Serbia) Maida Drndić	(Greece) Georgia Nimpiti	
III	4	10 February 2019	(Serbia) Sjenica	5 km F	(Bosnia and Herzegovina) Sanja Kusmuk	(Serbia) Maida Drndić	(Greece) Georgia Nimpiti	
III		13 February 2019	(North Macedonia) Mavrovo	5 km F	Cancelled			
III	5	14 February 2019	(North Macedonia) Mavrovo	5 km F	(Croatia) Vedrana Malec	(North Macedonia) Viktorija Todorovska	(Greece) Maria Tsakiri	
IV	6	2 March 2019	(Croatia) Ravna Gora	5 km C	(Croatia) Nika Jagečić	(Croatia) Gabrijela Skender	(Serbia) Anja Ilić	
IV	7	3 March 2019	(Croatia) Ravna Gora	5 km F	(Croatia) Nika Jagečić	(North Macedonia) Viktorija Todorovska	(Bosnia and Herzegovina) Sanja Kusmuk	
IV	8	9 March 2019	(Bosnia and Herzegovina) Dvorišta	5 km F	(Croatia) Vedrana Malec	(North Macedonia) Viktorija Todorovska	(Bosnia and Herzegovina) Sanja Kusmuk	
IV	9	10 March 2019	(Bosnia and Herzegovina) Dvorišta	10 km F	(Croatia) Vedrana Malec	(Croatia) Nika Jagečić	(Bosnia and Herzegovina) Sanja Kusmuk	
IV		17 March 2019	(Bulgaria) Borovets	5 km C	Cancelled			
IV		18 March 2019	(Bulgaria) Borovets	5 km F	Cancelled			
IV	10	23 March 2019	(Turkey) Gerede	5 km C	(Croatia) Vedrana Malec	(Russia) Varvara Prokhorova	(Turkey) Zozan Malkoç	
IV	11	24 March 2019	(Turkey) Gerede	10 km F	(Croatia) Vedrana Malec	(Russia) Varvara Prokhorova	(Turkey) Ayşenur Duman	

== Overall standings ==
=== Men's overall standings ===
Rank		Points
1	(Bosnia and Herzegovina) Strahinja Erić	593
2	(Croatia) Edi Dadić	581
3	(Bosnia and Herzegovina) Stefan Anić	372
4	(Serbia) Rejhan Šmrković	363
5	(Bulgaria) Todor Malchov	362
6	(Bulgaria) Aleksandar Ognyanov	355
7	(Bulgaria) Martin Penchev	280
8	(Bosnia and Herzegovina) Miloš Čolić	224
9	(Serbia) Miloš Milosavljević	217
10	(Bosnia and Herzegovina) Mihailo Skipina	191

=== Women's overall standings ===
Rank		Points
1	(Croatia) Vedrana Malec	700
2	(Bosnia and Herzegovina) Sanja Kusmuk	602
3	(Serbia) Anja Ilić	481
4	(Croatia) Nika Jagečić	407
5	(North Macedonia) Viktorija Todorovksa	240
6	(Greece) Styliani Giannakoviti	235
7	(Greece) Georgia Nimpiti	204
8	(Croatia) Gabrijela Skender	201
9	(Serbia) Anastasija Vojinović	180
10	(Serbia) Maida Drndić	160
