= Bulgaria at the 2018 Winter Olympics =

- Flag of Bulgaria
- IOC code: BUL
- NOC: Bulgarian Olympic Committee
- Website: www.bgolympic.org/home-en

in Pyeongchang
- Competitors: 21 in 6 sports
- Flag bearer (opening): Radoslav Yankov
- Flag bearer (closing): Yordan Chuchuganov
- Medals: Gold 0 Silver 0 Bronze 0 Total 0

Winter Olympics appearances (overview)
- 1936; 1948; 1952; 1956; 1960; 1964; 1968; 1972; 1976; 1980; 1984; 1988; 1992; 1994; 1998; 2002; 2006; 2010; 2014; 2018; 2022; 2026

Bulgaria competed at the 2018 Winter Olympics in Pyeongchang, South Korea, from 9 to 25 February 2018, with 21 competitors in 6 sports.

== Competitors ==
The following is the list of number of competitors participating at the Games per sport/discipline.

Sport	Men	Women	Total
Alpine skiing	2	1	3
Biathlon	5	5	10
Cross-country skiing	2	1	3
Luge	1	0	1
Ski jumping	1	0	1
Snowboarding	1	2	3
Total	12	9	21

== Alpine skiing ==
Bulgaria has qualified 2 men and 1 female competitors

Men

Athlete	Event	Run 1		Run 2		Total	
Athlete	Event	Time	Rank	Time	Rank	Time	Rank
Albert Popov	Men's slalom	DNF					
Albert Popov	Men's giant slalom	1:12.39	34	1:11.21	22	2:23.60	28
Kamen Zlatkov	Men's slalom	DNF					
Kamen Zlatkov	Men's giant slalom	1:17.65	59	DNF			

Women

Athlete	Event	Run 1		Run 2		Total	
Athlete	Event	Time	Rank	Time	Rank	Time	Rank
Maria Kirkova	Women's slalom	54.87	41	54.14	35	1:49.01	35
Maria Kirkova	Women's giant slalom	1:18.39	46	1:14.38	37	2:32.77	40

== Biathlon ==
Based on their Nations Cup rankings in the 2016–17 Biathlon World Cup, Bulgaria has qualified a team of 5 men and 5 women.

Men

Athlete	Event	Time	Misses	Rank
Krasimir Anev	Sprint	25:08.8	2 (1+1)	37
Krasimir Anev	Pursuit	37:57.9	5 (0+0+3+2)	45
Krasimir Anev	Individual	50:41.8	1 (0+0+0+1)	25
Dimitar Gerdzhikov	Sprint	26:47.9	4 (2+2)	81
Dimitar Gerdzhikov	Individual	52:12.0	3 (2+0+1+0)	43
Vladimir Iliev	Sprint	25:42.7	4 (0+4)	54
Vladimir Iliev	Pursuit	38:08.7	7 (1+3+2+1)	46
Vladimir Iliev	Individual	50:25.9	3 (0+1+1+1)	19
Anton Sinapov	Sprint	25:47.9	3 (2+1)	56
Anton Sinapov	Pursuit	40:49.1	8 (0+1+3+4)	60
Anton Sinapov	Individual	54:48.4	5 (0+2+0+3)	71
Krasimir Anev; Dimitar Gerdzhikov; Vladimir Iliev; Anton Sinapov	Team relay	LAP	16 (6+10)	16

Women

Athlete	Event	Time	Misses	Rank
Desislava Stoyanova	Sprint	24:54.3	5 (2+3)	76
Desislava Stoyanova	Individual	50:25.9	7 (2+2+2+1)	79
Emilia Yordanova	Sprint	23:50.0	1 (1+0)	60
Emilia Yordanova	Pursuit	37:04.3	6 (2+1+3+0)	55
Emilia Yordanova	Individual	50:56.3	6 (4+0+1+1)	82
Stefani Popova	Individual	50:20.3	5 (1+0+2+2)	77
Daniela Kadeva	Sprint	24:39.2	3 (2+1)	72
Daniela Kadeva	Individual	46:52.7	3 (0+0+1+2)	53
Milena Todorova	Sprint	25:33.6	2 (1+1)	84
Daniela Kadeva; Stefani Popova; Desislava Stoyanova; Emilia Yordanova	Team relay	1:14:38.0	11 (4+7)	16

Mixed

Athlete	Event	Time	Misses	Rank
Emilia Yordanova; Daniela Kadeva; Krasimir Anev; Vladimir Iliev	Team relay	1:12:31.7	11 (0+11)	17

== Cross-country skiing ==
Bulgaria has qualified 2 male and 1 female athletes.

Distance

Athlete	Event	Final		
Athlete	Event	Time	Deficit	Rank
Yordan Chuchuganov	Men's 15 km freestyle	40:39.6	+6:55.7	95
Veselin Tzinzov	Men's 15 km freestyle	36:17.3	+2:33.4	36
Veselin Tzinzov	Men's 50 km classical	DNF		
Antoniya Grigorova-Burgova	Women's 10 km freestyle	29:32.8	+4:32.3	66

Sprint

Athlete	Event	Qualification		Quarterfinal		Semifinal		Final	
Athlete	Event	Time	Rank	Time	Rank	Time	Rank	Time	Rank
Yordan Chuchuganov	Men's sprint	3:32.62	68	Did not advance					
Veselin Tzinzov	Men's sprint	3:28.19	59	Did not advance					
Yordan Chuchuganov; Veselin Tzinzov	Men's team sprint	—N/a				17:38.26	12	Did not advance	
Antoniya Grigorova-Burgova	Women's sprint	3:59.77	66	did not advance					

== Luge ==
Based on the results from the World Cups during the 2017–18 Luge World Cup season, Bulgaria qualified 1 sled.

Athlete	Event	Run 1		Run 2		Run 3		Run 4		Total	
Athlete	Event	Time	Rank	Time	Rank	Time	Rank	Time	Rank	Time	Rank
Pavel Angelov	Men's singles	51.569	37	49.449	36	50.094	39	did not advance		2:31.112	37

== Ski jumping ==
Bulgaria has qualified 1 male athlete: Vladimir Zografski.

Athlete	Event	Qualification			First round			Final			Total	
Athlete	Event	Distance	Points	Rank	Distance	Points	Rank	Distance	Points	Rank	Points	Rank
Vladimir Zografski	Men's normal hill	98.5	118.8	17 Q	101.5	106.8	23 Q	108.5	119.7	8	226.5	14
Vladimir Zografski	Men's large hill	123.0	94.3	31 Q	119.5	105.9	35	Did not advance				

== Snowboarding ==
Bulgaria has qualified 1 male and 1 female athletes. On 25 January they received a reallocation quota in the Women's giant slalom.

Parallel

Athlete	Event	Qualification		Round of 16	Quarterfinal	Semifinal	Final	
Athlete	Event	Time	Rank	Opposition Time	Opposition Time	Opposition Time	Opposition Time	Rank
Radoslav Yankov	Men's giant slalom	1:26.04	19	did not advance				
Teodora Pencheva	Women's giant slalom	1:38.63	27	did not advance				

Snowboard cross

Athlete	Event	Seeding						Quarterfinal	Semifinal	Final	
Athlete	Event	Run 1		Run 2		Best	Seed	Quarterfinal	Semifinal	Final	
Athlete	Event	Time	Rank	Time	Rank	Best	Seed	Position	Position	Position	Rank
Aleksandra Zhekova	Women's snowboard cross	1:20.23	9	Bye		1:20.23	9	1 Q	3 FA	6	6

Qualification legend: FA – Qualify to medal final; FB – Qualify to consolation final
