= FIS Cross-Country Balkan Cup =

Series of cross-country skiing event in Europe

- Genre: Cross-country skiing
- Date: Northern wintertime season
- Begins: January
- Ends: March
- Locations: Albania; Bosnia and Herzegovina; Bulgaria; Croatia; Greece; Montenegro; Moldova; North Macedonia; Romania; Serbia; Turkey
- Inaugurated: 2005
- Organiser: International Ski Federation

The FIS Cross-Country Balkan Cup is a series of cross-country skiing events arranged by the International Ski Federation (FIS). It is one of the nine FIS Cross-Country Continental Cups, a second-level competition ranked below the World Cup. The Balkan Cup is open for competitors from all nations, but are mainly a competition for skiers from eleven nations; Albania, Bosnia and Herzegovina, Bulgaria, Croatia, Greece, Montenegro, Moldova, North Macedonia, Romania, Serbia and Turkey.

The Balkan Cup has been held since the 2005–06 season and has been a part of the Cross-Country Continental Cup since then.

== World Cup qualification ==
In the end of certain periods, the overall leaders for both genders receive a place in the World Cup in the following period. The overall winners of the season receive a place in the World Cup in the beginning of the following season.

== Overall winners ==
=== Men ===
Season	Winner	Second	Third
2005–06	(Bulgaria) Veselin Tzinzov (1)	(Greece) Alexis Gkounko	(Turkey) Faith Yuksel
2006–07	(Romania) Paul Constantin Pepene (1)	(Turkey) Sabahattin Oğlago	(Turkey) Izzet Kizilarslan
2007–08	(Bulgaria) Veselin Tzinzov (2)	(Romania) Paul Constantin Pepene	(Turkey) Sabahattin Oğlago
2009	(Romania) Paul Constantin Pepene (2)	(Romania) Petrică Hogiu	(Turkey) Faith Yuksel
2009–10	(Romania) Paul Constantin Pepene (3)	(Bulgaria) Ivan Burgov	(North Macedonia) Darko Damjanovski
2011	(Bulgaria) Veselin Tzinzov (3)	(Bulgaria) Ivan Burgov	(Bosnia and Herzegovina) Mladen Plakalović
2012	(Romania) Paul Constantin Pepene (4)	(Bulgaria) Veselin Tzinzov	(Romania) Petrică Hogiu
2013	(Bulgaria) Veselin Tzinzov (3)	(Croatia) Edi Dadić	(Croatia) Andrej Burić
2014	(Bulgaria) Andrey Gridin	(Croatia) Edi Dadić	(Serbia) Milanko Petrović
2015	(Romania) Paul Constantin Pepene (5)	(Bulgaria) Veselin Tzinzov	(Romania) Petrică Hogiu
2016	(Bulgaria) Veselin Tzinzov (4)	(Bosnia and Herzegovina) Mladen Plakalović	(Serbia) Damir Rastič
2017	(Bulgaria) Veselin Tzinzov (5)	(Serbia) Damir Rastič	(Croatia) Edi Dadić
2018	(Bulgaria) Nikolay Vijaczev (2)	(Bulgaria) Martin Penchev	(Bulgaria) Yordan Chuchuganov
2019	(Bosnia and Herzegovina) Strahinja Erić	(Croatia) Edi Dadić	(Bosnia and Herzegovina) Stefan Anić
2020	(Romania) Petrică Hogiu	(Bosnia and Herzegovina) Strahinja Erić	(Turkey) Ömer Ayçiçek
2021	(Romania) Paul Constantin Pepene (6)	(Bosnia and Herzegovina) Strahinja Erić	(Romania) Petrică Hogiu

=== Women ===
Season	Winner	Second	Third
2005–06	(Bulgaria) Antoniya Grigorova (1)	(Bulgaria) Ljunosłava Djulgerova	(Greece) Katerina Taoula
2006–07	(Turkey) Kelime Çetinkaya (1)	(Romania) Mónika György	(Romania) Raluca Farkas
2007–08	(Turkey) Kelime Çetinkaya (2)	(Romania) Mónika György	(Bulgaria) Antoniya Grigorova
2009	(Turkey) Kelime Çetinkaya (3)	(Romania) Mónika György	(Romania) Ionela Gabriela Leanca
2009–10	(Bulgaria) Antoniya Grigorova (2)	(Bulgaria) Teodora Malcheva	(Romania) Mónika György
2011	(Bulgaria) Teodora Malcheva (1)	(Greece) Maria Boumpa	(Bulgaria) Kamelia Ileva
2012	(Bulgaria) Antoniya Grigorova (3)	(Romania) Mónika György	(Romania) Katalin Ferencz
2013	(Bulgaria) Teodora Malcheva (2)	(Croatia) Vedrana Malec	(Bulgaria) Antoniya Grigorova
2014	(Bulgaria) Antoniya Grigorova (4)	(Bulgaria) Teodora Malcheva	(Croatia) Vedrana Malec
2015	(Bosnia and Herzegovina) Tanja Karišik	(Romania) Timea Sara	(Croatia) Vedrana Malec
2016	(Croatia) Vedrana Malec (1)	(Turkey) Zozan Malkoç	(Turkey) Ayşe Saydam
2017	(Croatia) Vedrana Malec (2)	(Bosnia and Herzegovina) Sanja Kusmuk	(Greece) Maria Danu
2018	(Bulgaria) Nansi Okoro	(Serbia) Anja Ilić	(Greece) Maria Danu
2019	(Croatia) Vedrana Malec (3)	(Bosnia and Herzegovina) Sanja Kusmuk	(Serbia) Anja Ilić
2020	(Croatia) Vedrana Malec (4)	(Serbia) Maida Drndić	(Serbia) Anja Ilić
2021	(Croatia) Tena Hadžić	(Romania) Tímea Lőrincz	(Serbia) Anja Ilić
