= Biathlon at the 2018 Winter Olympics – Women's individual =

Women's individual at the XXIII Olympic Winter Games
- Venue: Alpensia Biathlon Centre in Pyeongchang, South Korea
- Date: 15 February 2018
- Competitors: 87 from 27 nations
- Winning time: 41:07.2

Medalists
| 1st place, gold medalist(s) | | Hanna Öberg | Sweden |
| 2nd place, silver medalist(s) | | Anastasiya Kuzmina | Slovakia |
| 3rd place, bronze medalist(s) | | Laura Dahlmeier | Germany |

The women's 15 km individual biathlon competition of the Pyeongchang 2018 Olympics was held on 15 February 2018 at the Alpensia Biathlon Centre in Pyeongchang, South Korea. The race was originally set to be held on 14 February 2018, but high winds forced officials to reschedule the race for the following day.

== Schedule ==
All times are (UTC+9).

| Date | Time | Round |
|---|---|---|
| 15 February | 17:15 | Final |

== Results ==
The race was started at 17:15.

| Rank | Bib | Name | Country | Time | Penalties (P+S+P+S) | Deficit |
|---|---|---|---|---|---|---|
| 1st place, gold medalist(s) | 24 | Hanna Öberg | Sweden | 41:07.2 | 0 (0+0+0+0) | – |
| 2nd place, silver medalist(s) | 6 | Anastasiya Kuzmina | Slovakia | 41:31.9 | 2 (0+1+1+0) | +24.7 |
| 3rd place, bronze medalist(s) | 80 | Laura Dahlmeier | Germany | 41:48.4 | 1 (1+0+0+0) | +41.2 |
| 4 | 73 | Franziska Preuß | Germany | 42:06.9 | 0 (0+0+0+0) | +59.7 |
| 5 | 34 | Paulína Fialková | Slovakia | 42:09.5 | 1 (1+0+0+0) | +1:02.3 |
| 6 | 57 | Monika Hojnisz | Poland | 43:02.0 | 1 (0+1+0+0) | +1:54.8 |
| 7 | 69 | Dorothea Wierer | Italy | 43:15.8 | 2 (0+1+0+1) | +2:08.6 |
| 8 | 7 | Elisa Gasparin | Switzerland | 43:22.4 | 1 (1+0+0+0) | +2:15.2 |
| 9 | 45 | Franziska Hildebrand | Germany | 43:38.6 | 1 (0+1+0+0) | +2:31.4 |
| 10 | 32 | Nadezhda Skardino | Belarus | 43:40.2 | 1 (0+0+0+1) | +2:33.0 |
| 11 | 11 | Linn Persson | Sweden | 43:41.5 | 1 (1+0+0+0) | +2:34.3 |
| 12 | 68 | Urška Poje | Slovenia | 43:52.7 | 0 (0+0+0+0) | +2:45.5 |
| 13 | 33 | Kaisa Mäkäräinen | Finland | 43:57.9 | 3 (1+1+1+0) | +2:50.7 |
| 14 | 60 | Mona Brorsson | Sweden | 44:13.8 | 2 (1+0+0+1) | +3:06.6 |
| 15 | 52 | Tatiana Akimova | Olympic Athletes from Russia | 44:17.6 | 2 (0+1+0+1) | +3:10.4 |
| 16 | 8 | Ekaterina Avvakumova | South Korea | 44:25.3 | 1 (0+0+1+0) | +3:18.1 |
| 17 | 54 | Maren Hammerschmidt | Germany | 44:28.0 | 3 (1+1+0+1) | +3:20.8 |
| 18 | 15 | Veronika Vítková | Czech Republic | 44:31.5 | 3 (1+1+1+0) | +3:24.3 |
| 19 | 40 | Susan Dunklee | United States | 44:33.5 | 2 (0+1+0+1) | +3:26.3 |
| 20 | 56 | Yuliia Dzhima | Ukraine | 44:33.9 | 2 (1+0+1+0) | +3:26.7 |
| 21 | 9 | Weronika Nowakowska | Poland | 44:34.6 | 2 (0+0+0+2) | +3:27.4 |
| 22 | 85 | Joanne Reid | United States | 44:41.3 | 1 (0+1+0+0) | +3:34.1 |
| 23 | 36 | Tiril Eckhoff | Norway | 44:41.9 | 4 (1+1+1+1) | +3:34.7 |
| 24 | 25 | Uliana Kaisheva | Olympic Athletes from Russia | 44:47.9 | 2 (0+2+0+0) | +3:40.7 |
| 25 | 44 | Valentyna Semerenko | Ukraine | 44:53.9 | 1 (0+0+0+1) | +3:46.7 |
| 26 | 59 | Rosanna Crawford | Canada | 44:55.9 | 2 (2+0+0+0) | +3:48.7 |
| 27 | 28 | Darya Domracheva | Belarus | 44:57.8 | 4 (0+0+1+3) | +3:50.6 |
| 28 | 42 | Anaïs Chevalier | France | 45:01.9 | 3 (1+1+1+0) | +3:54.7 |
| 29 | 10 | Sarah Beaudry | Canada | 45:05.6 | 1 (0+1+0+0) | +3:58.4 |
| 30 | 72 | Natalija Kočergina | Lithuania | 45:09.1 | 1 (0+0+1+0) | +4:01.9 |
| 31 | 27 | Anaïs Bescond | France | 45:10.9 | 3 (2+0+1+0) | +4:03.7 |
| 32 | 49 | Lisa Vittozzi | Italy | 45:11.8 | 3 (0+2+0+1) | +4:04.6 |
| 33 | 82 | Alexia Runggaldier | Italy | 45:15.0 | 2 (0+0+1+1) | +4:07.8 |
| 34 | 43 | Lena Häcki | Switzerland | 45:22.5 | 4 (1+2+1+0) | +4:15.3 |
| 35 | 41 | Anja Eržen | Slovenia | 45:22.9 | 3 (0+0+0+3) | +4:15.7 |
| 36 | 13 | Iryna Kryuko | Belarus | 45:26.0 | 3 (0+2+0+1) | +4:18.8 |
| 37 | 84 | Anna Magnusson | Sweden | 45:27.2 | 2 (2+0+0+0) | +4:20.0 |
| 38 | 67 | Nicole Gontier | Italy | 45:32.5 | 4 (1+1+1+1) | +4:25.3 |
| 39 | 4 | Baiba Bendika | Latvia | 45:32.8 | 4 (0+1+1+2) | +4:25.6 |
| 40 | 51 | Synnøve Solemdal | Norway | 45:33.0 | 2 (0+1+0+1) | +4:25.8 |
| 41 | 39 | Lisa Hauser | Austria | 45:35.4 | 3 (1+1+0+1) | +4:28.2 |
| 42 | 18 | Mari Laukkanen | Finland | 46:03.7 | 4 (2+1+0+1) | +4:56.5 |
| 43 | 78 | Ingrid Landmark Tandrevold | Norway | 46:14.7 | 3 (0+2+0+1) | +5:07.5 |
| 44 | 31 | Eva Puskarčíková | Czech Republic | 46:22.0 | 3 (1+0+2+0) | +5:14.8 |
| 45 | 70 | Galina Vishnevskaya | Kazakhstan | 46:23.4 | 3 (0+2+1+0) | +5:16.2 |
| 46 | 1 | Olga Poltoranina | Kazakhstan | 46:36.5 | 2 (0+0+1+1) | +5:29.3 |
| 47 | 20 | Alina Raikova | Kazakhstan | 46:37.4 | 3 (0+1+0+2) | +5:30.2 |
| 48 | 5 | Célia Aymonier | France | 46:40.3 | 5 (2+1+0+2) | +5:33.1 |
| 49 | 47 | Laura Toivanen | Finland | 46:42.6 | 3 (1+1+0+1) | +5:35.4 |
| 50 | 22 | Johanna Talihärm | Estonia | 46:44.0 | 3 (1+2+0+0) | +5:36.8 |
| 51 | 76 | Darya Klimina | Kazakhstan | 46:44.4 | 3 (2+0+1+0) | +5:37.2 |
| 52 | 30 | Krystyna Guzik | Poland | 46:49.5 | 4 (1+0+2+1) | +5:42.3 |
| 53 | 64 | Daniela Kadeva | Bulgaria | 46:52.7 | 3 (0+0+1+2) | +5:45.5 |
| 54 | 79 | Emma Lunder | Canada | 46:56.6 | 3 (0+1+1+1) | +5:49.4 |
| 55 | 35 | Justine Braisaz | France | 46:57.2 | 5 (1+2+2+0) | +5:50.0 |
| 56 | 55 | Dzinara Alimbekava | Belarus | 47:04.0 | 4 (1+1+1+1) | +5:56.8 |
| 57 | 66 | Markéta Davidová | Czech Republic | 47:06.7 | 5 (1+1+0+3) | +5:59.5 |
| 58 | 83 | Dunja Zdouc | Austria | 47:09.0 | 2 (1+1+0+0) | +6:01.8 |
| 59 | 38 | Zhang Yan | China | 47:29.6 | 4 (1+2+0+1) | +6:22.4 |
| 60 | 48 | Katharina Innerhofer | Austria | 47:34.9 | 5 (2+1+0+2) | +6:27.7 |
| 61 | 50 | Anna Frolina | South Korea | 47:50.4 | 5 (1+0+1+3) | +6:43.2 |
| 62 | 14 | Clare Egan | United States | 48:00.8 | 4 (0+3+0+1) | +6:53.6 |
| 63 | 65 | Vita Semerenko | Ukraine | 48:03.8 | 5 (0+3+1+1) | +6:56.6 |
| 64 | 53 | Ivona Fialková | Slovakia | 48:04.4 | 6 (1+1+1+3) | +6:57.2 |
| 65 | 37 | Selina Gasparin | Switzerland | 48:07.4 | 5 (1+0+2+2) | +7:00.2 |
| 66 | 58 | Tang Jialin | China | 48:12.0 | 2 (1+1+0+0) | +7:04.8 |
| 67 | 63 | Emily Dreissigacker | United States | 48:16.4 | 4 (2+1+0+1) | +7:09.2 |
| 68 | 71 | Aita Gasparin | Switzerland | 48:26.2 | 5 (1+2+1+1) | +7:19.0 |
| 69 | 87 | Suvi Minkkinen | Finland | 48:27.7 | 4 (2+1+0+1) | +7:20.5 |
| 70 | 21 | Anastasiya Merkushyna | Ukraine | 48:42.0 | 6 (1+1+3+1) | +7:34.8 |
| 71 | 2 | Marte Olsbu | Norway | 48:58.8 | 7 (1+1+3+2) | +7:51.6 |
| 72 | 3 | Jessica Jislová | Czech Republic | 49:00.6 | 5 (1+1+0+3) | +7:53.4 |
| 73 | 23 | Amanda Lightfoot | Great Britain | 49:14.7 | 6 (2+1+0+3) | +8:07.5 |
| 74 | 16 | Julia Ransom | Canada | 49:38.9 | 5 (1+1+2+1) | +8:31.7 |
| 75 | 62 | Diana Rasimovičiūtė | Lithuania | 49:53.3 | 5 (1+2+0+2) | +8:46.1 |
| 76 | 61 | Fuyuko Tachizaki | Japan | 50:06.9 | 7 (3+1+2+1) | +8:59.7 |
| 77 | 77 | Stefani Popova | Bulgaria | 50:20.3 | 5 (1+0+2+2) | +9:13.1 |
| 78 | 29 | Mun Ji-hee | South Korea | 50:21.5 | 7 (0+3+2+2) | +9:14.3 |
| 79 | 17 | Desislava Stoyanova | Bulgaria | 50:25.9 | 7 (2+2+2+1) | +9:18.7 |
| 80 | 26 | Yurie Tanaka | Japan | 50:28.0 | 5 (2+2+0+1) | +9:20.8 |
| 81 | 74 | Asuka Hachisuka | Japan | 50:30.2 | 4 (1+1+1+1) | +9:23.0 |
| 82 | 46 | Emilia Yordanova | Bulgaria | 50:56.3 | 6 (4+0+1+1) | +9:49.1 |
| 83 | 81 | Magdalena Gwizdoń | Poland | 51:49.7 | 8 (1+2+3+2) | +10:42.5 |
| 84 | 19 | Éva Tófalvi | Romania | 52:13.7 | 7 (1+2+4+0) | +11:06.5 |
| 85 | 12 | Sari Furuya | Japan | 53:11.0 | 9 (2+2+3+2) | +12:03.8 |
| 86 | 86 | Jung Ju-mi | South Korea | 53:32.8 | 6 (2+2+0+2) | +12:25.6 |
| 87 | 75 | Terézia Poliaková | Slovakia | 54:46.3 | 10 (1+4+3+2) | +13:39.1 |
