= Cross-country skiing at the 2018 Winter Olympics – Women's sprint =

Women's sprint at the XXIII Olympic Winter Games
- Cross-country skiing
- Venue: Alpensia Cross-Country Skiing Centre
- Dates: 13 February 2018
- Competitors: 68 from 28 nations

Medalists
1st place, gold medalist(s)		Stina Nilsson	Sweden
2nd place, silver medalist(s)		Maiken Caspersen Falla	Norway
3rd place, bronze medalist(s)		Yulia Belorukova	Olympic Athletes from Russia

The women's individual sprint classical cross-country skiing competition at the 2018 Winter Olympics was held on 13 February 2018 at 20:00 KST at the Alpensia Cross-Country Skiing Centre in Pyeongchang, South Korea. The sprint distance was 1.2km.

== Qualification ==
A total of up to 310 cross-country skiers qualified across all eleven events. Athletes qualified for this event by having met the A qualification standard, which meant having 100 or less FIS Points or meeting the B standard, which meant 120 or less FIS points in the sprint classification. Countries not meeting the A standard were allowed to enter a maximum of one B standard athlete per gender. The Points list takes into average the best results of athletes per discipline during the qualification period (1 July 2016 to 21 January 2018). Countries received additional quotas by having athletes ranked in the top 30 of the FIS Olympics Points list (two per gender maximum, overall across all events). Countries also received an additional quota (one per gender maximum) if an athlete was ranked in the top 300 of the FIS Olympics Points list. After the distribution of B standard quotas, the remaining quotas were distributed using the Olympic FIS Points list, with each athlete only counting once for qualification purposes. A country could only enter a maximum of four athletes for the event.

== Results ==
Q — qualified for next round
LL — lucky loser
PF — photo finish

=== Qualifying ===
The qualifying was started at 17:30.

Rank	Bib	Athlete	Country	Time	Deficit	Note
1	12	Stina Nilsson	Sweden	3:08.74	—	Q
2	7	Maiken Caspersen Falla	Norway	3:09.13	+0.39	Q
3	3	Krista Pärmäkoski	Finland	3:12.30	+3.56	Q
4	6	Hanna Falk	Sweden	3:12.54	+3.80	Q
5	5	Katja Višnar	Slovenia	3:15.24	+6.50	Q
6	19	Natalya Nepryayeva	Olympic Athletes from Russia	3:15.65	+6.91	Q
7	15	Jessie Diggins	United States	3:15.76	+7.02	Q
8	22	Ida Ingemarsdotter	Sweden	3:16.06	+7.32	Q
9	4	Sadie Bjornsen	United States	3:16.12	+7.38	Q
10	16	Heidi Weng	Norway	3:16.28	+7.54	Q
11	9	Anamarija Lampič	Slovenia	3:16.57	+7.83	Q
12	18	Sophie Caldwell	United States	3:17.06	+8.32	Q
13	8	Ingvild Flugstad Østberg	Norway	3:17.35	+8.61	Q
14	1	Anna Dyvik	Sweden	3:17.99	+9.25	Q
15	10	Yuliya Belorukova	Olympic Athletes from Russia	3:18.26	+9.52	Q
16	13	Sandra Ringwald	Germany	3:18.43	+9.69	Q
17	11	Kathrine Harsem	Norway	3:18.48	+9.74	Q
18	20	Gaia Vuerich	Italy	3:19.01	+10.27	Q
19	34	Johanna Matintalo	Finland	3:19.04	+10.30	Q
20	24	Nadine Fähndrich	Switzerland	3:19.42	+10.68	Q
21	17	Laurien van der Graaff	Switzerland	3:19.62	+10.88	Q
22	30	Justyna Kowalczyk	Poland	3:20.00	+11.26	Q
23	49	Kateřina Beroušková	Czech Republic	3:20.09	+11.35	Q
24	26	Kerttu Niskanen	Finland	3:20.48	+11.74	Q
25	42	Katharina Hennig	Germany	3:22.64	+13.90	Q
26	28	Elisabeth Schicho	Germany	3:23.26	+14.52	Q
27	46	Anna Shevchenko	Kazakhstan	3:23.27	+14.53	Q
28	29	Lucia Scardoni	Italy	3:23.32	+14.58	Q
29	2	Alenka Čebašek	Slovenia	3:23.38	+14.64	Q
30	25	Aino-Kaisa Saarinen	Finland	3:24.02	+15.28	Q
31	31	Alena Procházková	Slovakia	3:24.61	+15.87	
32	23	Greta Laurent	Italy	3:25.54	+16.80	
33	21	Ida Sargent	United States	3:25.80	+17.06	
34	44	Emily Nishikawa	Canada	3:26.75	+18.01	
35	45	Yulia Tikhonova	Belarus	3:27.19	+18.45	
36	14	Hanna Kolb	Germany	3:27.84	+19.10	
37	47	Sylwia Jaśkowiec	Poland	3:27.94	+19.20	
38	37	Ewelina Marcisz	Poland	3:28.11	+19.37	
39	50	Tatjana Mannima	Estonia	3:28.57	+19.83	
40	40	Anastasia Kirillova	Belarus	3:28.98	+20.24	
41	38	Polina Seronosova	Belarus	3:29.44	+20.70	
42	33	Dahria Beatty	Canada	3:29.77	+21.03	
43	36	Karolína Grohová	Czech Republic	3:30.91	+22.17	
44	39	Alisa Zhambalova	Olympic Athletes from Russia	3:31.53	+22.79	
45	52	Petra Hynčicová	Czech Republic	3:32.03	+23.29	
46	27	Aurore Jéan	France	3:32.45	+23.71	
47	43	Valiantsina Kaminskaya	Belarus	3:32.80	+24.06	
48	35	Jessica Yeaton	Australia	3:33.01	+24.27	
49	59	Li Xin	China	3:33.61	+24.87	
50	32	Lisa Unterweger	Austria	3:34.29	+25.55	
51	48	Cendrine Browne	Canada	3:34.30	+25.56	
52	41	Nika Razinger	Slovenia	3:35.11	+26.37	
53	64	Barbora Klementová	Slovakia	3:38.00	+29.26	
54	57	Tetyana Antypenko	Ukraine	3:38.56	+29.82	
55	56	Elena Kolomina	Kazakhstan	3:39.22	+30.48	
56	58	Maryna Antsybor	Ukraine	3:40.17	+31.43	
57	60	Chi Chunxue	China	3:42.70	+33.96	
58	63	Aimee Watson	Australia	3:44.87	+36.13	
59	53	Mathilde-Amivi Petitjean	Togo	3:45.93	+37.19	
60	61	Valeriya Tyuleneva	Kazakhstan	3:47.27	+38.53	
61	62	Tímea Lőrincz	Romania	3:48.84	+40.10	
62	51	Patrīcija Eiduka	Latvia	3:49.70	+40.96	
63	55	Casey Wright	Australia	3:49.80	+41.06	
64	54	Vedrana Malec	Croatia	3:54.76	+46.02	
65	67	Gabrijela Skender	Croatia	3:56.23	+47.49	
66	66	Antoniya Grigorova	Bulgaria	3:59.77	+51.03	
67	65	Ju Hye-ri	South Korea	4:11.92	+1:03.18	
68	68	Samaneh Beyrami Baher	Iran	4:47.91	+1:39.17	

=== Quarterfinals ===
Quarterfinal 1

Rank	Seed	Athlete	Country	Time	Deficit	Note
1	1	Stina Nilsson	Sweden	3:10.90	—	Q
2	3	Krista Pärmäkoski	Finland	3:11.97	+1.07	Q
3	11	Anamarija Lampič	Slovenia	3:12.46	+1.56	LL
4	17	Kathrine Harsem	Norway	3:14.87	+3.97	
5	30	Aino-Kaisa Saarinen	Finland	3:19.18	+8.28	
6	27	Anna Shevchenko	Kazakhstan	3:23.56	+12.66	

Quarterfinal 2

Rank	Seed	Athlete	Country	Time	Deficit	Note
1	2	Maiken Caspersen Falla	Norway	3:11.98	—	Q
2	12	Sophie Caldwell	United States	3:12.39	+0.41	Q
3	8	Ida Ingemarsdotter	Sweden	3:14.58	+2.60	
4	5	Katja Višnar	Slovenia	3:20.49	+8.51	
5	28	Lucia Scardoni	Italy	3:22.49	+10.51	
6	29	Alenka Čebašek	Slovenia	3:30.87	+18.89	

Quarterfinal 3

Rank	Seed	Athlete	Country	Time	Deficit	Note
1	4	Hanna Falk	Sweden	3:11.08	—	Q
2	7	Jessie Diggins	United States	3:11.24	+0.16	Q
3	16	Sandra Ringwald	Germany	3:13.76	+2.68	
4	20	Nadine Fähndrich	Switzerland	3:14.82	+3.74	
5	24	Kerttu Niskanen	Finland	3:19.84	+8.76	
6	23	Kateřina Beroušková	Czech Republic	3:27.43	+16.35	

Quarterfinal 4

Rank	Seed	Athlete	Country	Time	Deficit	Note
1	15	Yuliya Belorukova	Olympic Athletes from Russia	3:14.29	—	Q
2	10	Heidi Weng	Norway	3:15.68	+1.39	Q
3	9	Sadie Bjornsen	United States	3:16.75	+2.46	
4	19	Johanna Matintalo	Finland	3:16.92	+2.63	
5	18	Gaia Vuerich	Italy	3:21.65	+7.36	
6	26	Elisabeth Schicho	Germany	3:24.26	+9.97	

Quarterfinal 5

Rank	Seed	Athlete	Country	Time	Deficit	Note
1	6	Natalya Nepryayeva	Olympic Athletes from Russia	3:11.78	—	Q
2	21	Laurien van der Graaff	Switzerland	3:12.15	+0.37	Q
3	14	Anna Dyvik	Sweden	3:13.09	+1.31	LL
4	13	Ingvild Flugstad Østberg	Norway	3:14.87	+3.09	
5	22	Justyna Kowalczyk	Poland	3:17.47	+5.69	
6	25	Katharina Hennig	Germany	3:19.55	+7.77	

=== Semifinals ===
Semifinal 1

Rank	Seed	Athlete	Country	Time	Deficit	Note
1	1	Stina Nilsson	Sweden	3:10.52	—	Q, PF
2	2	Maiken Caspersen Falla	Norway	3:10.55	+0.03	Q, PF
3	4	Hanna Falk	Sweden	3:11.14	+0.62	LL
4	12	Sophie Caldwell	United States	3:11.32	+0.80	
5	3	Krista Pärmäkoski	Finland	3:12.04	+1.52	
6	14	Anna Dyvik	Sweden	3:15.77	+5.25	

Semifinal 2

Rank	Seed	Athlete	Country	Time	Deficit	Note
1	15	Yuliya Belorukova	Olympic Athletes from Russia	3:10.12	—	Q
2	7	Jessie Diggins	United States	3:10.72	+0.60	Q, PF
3	6	Natalya Nepryayeva	Olympic Athletes from Russia	3:10.72	+0.60	LL, PF
4	11	Anamarija Lampič	Slovenia	3:13.95	+3.83	
5	21	Laurien van der Graaff	Switzerland	3:15.65	+5.53	
6	10	Heidi Weng	Norway	3:16.22	+6.10	

=== Final ===
The final was held at 21:24.

Rank	Seed	Athlete	Country	Time	Deficit	Note
1st place, gold medalist(s)	1	Stina Nilsson	Sweden	3:03.84	—	
2nd place, silver medalist(s)	2	Maiken Caspersen Falla	Norway	3:06.87	+3.03	
3rd place, bronze medalist(s)	15	Yuliya Belorukova	Olympic Athletes from Russia	3:07.21	+3.37	
4	6	Natalya Nepryayeva	Olympic Athletes from Russia	3:12.98	+9.14	
5	4	Hanna Falk	Sweden	3:15.00	+11.16	
6	7	Jessie Diggins	United States	3:15.07	+11.23	
