= Jakub Wolny =

Polish ski jumper (born 1995)

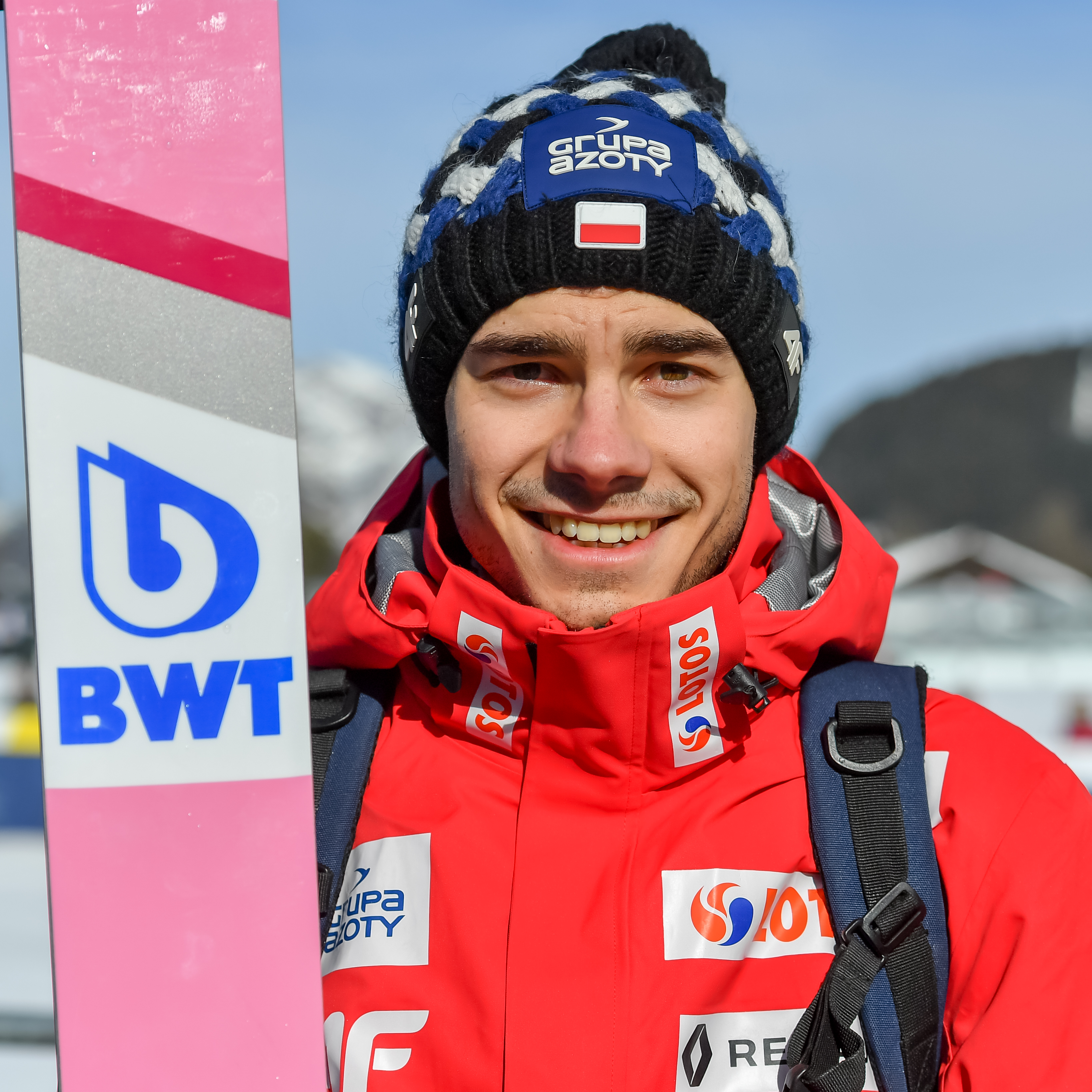
- Wolny at the 2019 World Championships in Seefeld

Personal information
- Nationality: Poland
- Born: 15 May 1995 (age 31) Bielsko-Biała, Poland
- Height: 1.77 m (5 ft 10 in)

Sport
- Sport: Skiing
- Club: LKS Klimczok Bystra

World Cup career
- Seasons: 2014–present
- Indiv. starts: 87
- Team podiums: 3
- Team wins: 3

Achievements and titles
- Personal bests: 237.5 m (779 ft); Planica, 23 March 2019
Medal record
Men's ski jumping
World Junior Championship
Gold medal – first place	2014 Val di Fiemme	Individual NH
Gold medal – first place	2014 Val di Fiemme	Team NH
- Updated on 26 March 2021

Jakub Wolny (born 15 May 1995) is a Polish ski jumper, a member of the national team, a double 2014 Junior World Champion.

== Personal life ==
Jakub Wolny was born in Bielsko-Biała, but lives in Wilkowice.

== Career ==
His first jump he gave in 2002. Since the season 2004/2005 has performed in Lotos Cup. In May 2013 he appeared in the National Junior Olympics, where he won three gold medals (two individual and one with team). On 27 December 2013 he won the first points of the winter edition of the Continental Cup - he was 8th in Engelberg. On 19 January 2014 he debuted in World Cup competition in Zakopane, where was 45th. On 31 January 2014 he won individual a gold medal at the World Junior Championships 2014 in Val di Fiemme. Next day he won a gold medal again with Polish team Klemens Murańka, Krzysztof Biegun and Aleksander Zniszczoł.

== World Championships ==
Place	Day	Year	Locality	Hill	Point K	HS	Competition	Jump 1	Jump 2	Note (points)	Loss (points)	Winner
40.	23 February	2019	Innsbruck	Bergisel	K-120	HS-130	individual	113.0 m	—	91.8	187.6	Markus Eisenbichler

== World Cup ==
=== Season standings ===
Season	Overall	Ski-Flying	Four Hills Tournament	Raw Air	Willingen Five	Planica 7
2013–14	–	–	–	–	–	–
2015–16	69	–	–	–	–	–
2016–17	–	–	–	–	–	–
2017–18	36	43	38	27	31	41
2018–19	22	11	29	8	26	9
2019–20	36					
2020–21	26	11	–		23	

=== Individual starts ===
Season	1	2	3	4	5	6	7	8	9	10	11	12	13	14	15	16	17	18	19	20	21	22	23	24	25	26	27	28	29	30	31	Points
2013/14	Klingenthal	Kuusamo	Lillehammer	Lillehammer	Titisee-Neustadt	Titisee-Neustadt	Engelberg	Engelberg	Oberstdorf	Garmisch-Partenkirchen	Innsbruck	Bischofshofen	Tauplitz	Tauplitz	Wisła	Zakopane	Sapporo	Sapporo	Willingen	Willingen	Falun	Lahti	Lahti	Kuopio	Trondheim	Oslo	Planica	Planica				0
2013/14	–	–	–	–	–	–	–	–	–	–	–	–	–	–	q	45	–	–	–	–	–	–	–	–	–	–	–	–				0
2015/16	Klingenthal	Lillehammer	Lillehammer	Nizhny Tagil	Nizhny Tagil	Engelberg	Engelberg	Oberstdorf	Garmisch-Partenkirchen	Innsbruck	Bischofshofen	Willingen	Zakopane	Sapporo	Sapporo	Trondheim	Vikersund	Vikersund	Vikersund	Lahti	Lahti	Kuopio	Almaty	Almaty	Wisła	Titisee-Neustadt	Titisee-Neustadt	Planica	Planica			5
2015/16	–	–	–	–	–	–	–	–	–	–	–	30	27	–	–	–	–	–	–	–	–	–	36	46	q	–	–	–	–			5
2017/18	Wisła	Kuusamo	Nizhny Tagil	Nizhny Tagil	Titisee-Neustadt	Engelberg	Engelberg	Oberstdorf	Garmisch-Partenkirchen	Innsbruck	Bischofshofen	Tauplitz	Zakopane	Willingen	Willingen	Lahti	Oslo	Lillehammer	Trondheim	Vikersund	Planica	Planica										73
2017/18	32	30	30	26	30	34	24	q	33	15	50	37	39	23	31	26	22	20	28	27	29	–										73
2018/19	Wisła	Kuusamo	Kuusamo	Nizhny Tagil	Nizhny Tagil	Engelberg	Engelberg	Oberstdorf	Garmisch-Partenkirchen	Innsbruck	Bischofshofen	Predazzo	Predazzo	Zakopane	Sapporo	Sapporo	Oberstdorf	Oberstdorf	Oberstdorf	Lahti	Willingen	Willingen	Oslo	Lillehammer	Trondheim	Vikersund	Planica	Planica				328
2018/19	23	11	13	47	q	41	22	26	13	34	45	40	29	22	35	30	25	16	6	14	33	16	19	21	13	4	12	12				328
2019/20	Wisła	Kuusamo	Nizhny Tagil	Nizhny Tagil	Klingenthal	Engelberg	Engelberg	Oberstdorf	Garmisch-Partenkirchen	Innsbruck	Bischofshofen	Predazzo	Predazzo	Titisee-Neustadt	Titisee-Neustadt	Zakopane	Sapporo	Sapporo	Willingen	Willingen	Tauplitz	Tauplitz	Râșnov	Râșnov	Lahti	Lahti	Oslo	Lillehammer	Trondheim	Vikersund		22
2019/20	33	27	32	16	28	q	52	–	q																							22
2020/21	Wisła HS134	Kuusamo HS142	Kuusamo HS142	Nizhny Tagil HS134	Nizhny Tagil HS134	Engelberg HS140	Engelberg HS140	Oberstdorf HS137	Garmisch-Partenkirchen HS142	Innsbruck HS130	Bischofshofen HS142	Titisee-Neustadt HS142	Titisee-Neustadt HS142	Zakopane HS140	Lahti HS130	Willingen HS147	Willingen HS147	Klingenthal HS140	Klingenthal HS140	Zakopane HS140	Zakopane HS140	Râșnov HS97	Planica HS240	Planica HS240	Planica HS240							190
2020/21	33	–	–	15	44	–	–	–	–	–	–	11	9	33	22	17	18	14	20	36	35	19	14	10								190

=== Team victories ===
	Day	Year	Location	Hill	Point K	HS	Jump 1	Jump 2	Note (points)
1.	17 November	2018	Wisła	Malinka	K-120	HS-134	128.0 m	125.5 m	1026.6 (246.9)
2.	15 February	2019	Willingen	Mühlenkopfschanze	K-130	HS-145	140.5 m	141.5 m	979.4 (256.3)
3.	14 December	2019	Klingenthal	Vogtlandarena	K-125	HS-140	136.0 m	130.0 m	968.7 (241.7)
