= Elisabeth Schicho =

German skier (born 1991)

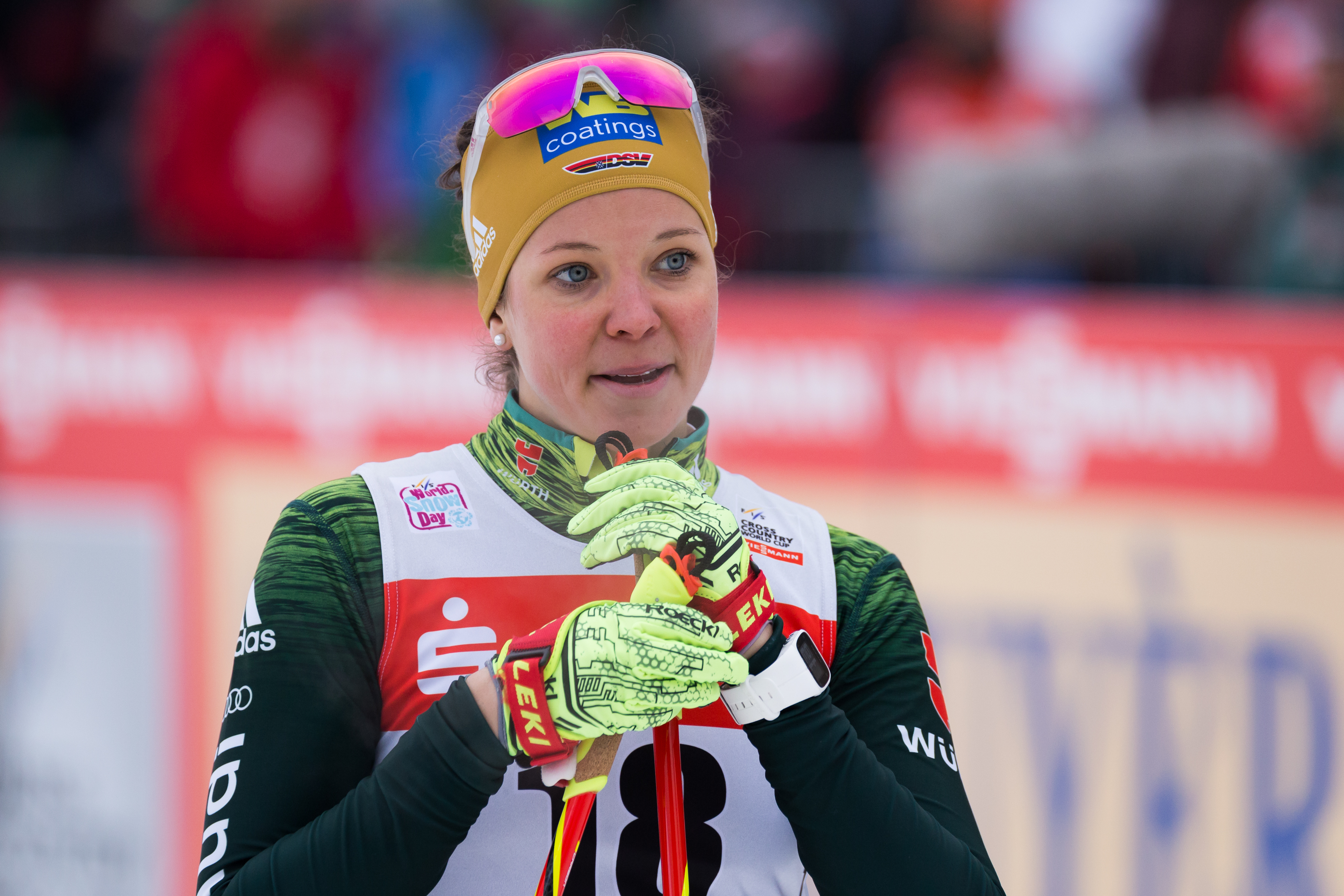
- Schicho in Dresden, 2018

Personal information
- Nationality: Germany
- Born: 10 May 1991 (age 35) Tegernsee, Germany

Sport
- Sport: Skiing
- Club: SC Schliersee

World Cup career
- Seasons: 7 – (2013–2019)
- Indiv. starts: 48
- Indiv. podiums: 0
- Team starts: 5
- Team podiums: 0
- Overall titles: 0 – (55th in 2017)
- Discipline titles: 0
Medal record
Women's cross-country skiing
Representing Germany
U23 World Championships
Gold medal – first place	2014 Val di Fiemme	Individual sprint
Bronze medal – third place	2014 Val di Fiemme	10 km classical
- Updated on 30 March 2019

Elisabeth Schicho (born 10 May 1991) is a German former cross-country skier. She competed in the women's sprint at the 2018 Winter Olympics. She announced her retirement from cross-country skiing in March 2019.

== Cross-country skiing results ==
All results are sourced from the International Ski Federation (FIS).

=== Olympic Games ===
Year	Age	10 km individual	15 km skiathlon	30 km mass start	Sprint	4 × 5 km relay	Team sprint
2018	26	—	—	—	28	—	—

=== World Cup ===
==== Season standings ====
Season	Age	Discipline standings			Ski Tour standings			
Season	Age	Overall	Distance	Sprint	Nordic Opening	Tour de Ski	World Cup Final	Ski Tour Canada
2013	22	117	NC	75	—	DNF	—	—N/a
2014	23	93	NC	60	—	—	34	—N/a
2015	24	NC	NC	NC	DNF	DNF	—N/a	—N/a
2016	25	NC	NC	NC	—	—	—N/a	—
2017	26	55	46	42	—	DNF	—	—N/a
2018	27	75	NC	46	—	DNF	—	—N/a
2019	28	100	NC	66	—	DNF	—	—N/a
