= Varvara Prokhorova =

Russian skier (born 1991)

Personal information
- Full name: Varvara Alexandrovna Prokhorova
- Nationality: Russian
- Citizenship: Russia
- Born: 27 December 1991 (age 34) Moscow, Russia

Sport
- Sport: Roller skiing, ski mountaineering, obstacle races
- Coached by: Ryabov A. V.
Medal record
Spartan Race World Championship
Silver medal – second place	2018	Obstacle Races
Gold medal – first place	2019	Obstacle Races
FIS International Competitions
Silver medal – second place	2019	Individual Race
Silver medal – second place	2020	Individual Race
Gold medal – first place	2021	Individual Race
Russian Cross-Country Skiing Cup
Gold medal – first place	2016	Sprint
Russialoppet Marathons
Gold medal – first place	2018	Marathon
Gold medal – first place	2021	Marathon
Silver medal – second place	2013	Marathon
Silver medal – second place	2017	Marathon
Silver medal – second place	2021	Marathon
Bronze medal – third place	2014	Marathon
Bronze medal – third place	2015	Marathon
Bronze medal – third place	2017	Marathon
Bronze medal – third place	2018	Marathon
Bronze medal – third place	2019	Marathon
Bronze medal – third place	2021	Marathon
Russialoppet Super Cup
Bronze medal – third place	2018	Marathon
Gold medal – first place	2021	Marathon
Gold medal – first place	2023	Marathon
Silver medal – second place	2023	Marathon
Russian Ski Mountaineering Championships
Bronze medal – third place	2016	Team Race
Gold medal – first place	2022	Relay
Silver medal – second place	2022	Sprint
Silver medal – second place	2023	Sprint
Silver medal – second place	2023	Individual Race
Silver medal – second place	2023	Vertical Race
Gold medal – first place	2023	Team Race
Silver medal – second place	2024	Team Relay
Bronze medal – third place	2024	Team Race
Russian Ski Mountaineering Cup
Gold medal – first place	2016	Sprint
Gold medal – first place	2016	Individual Race
Gold medal – first place	2016	Team Race
Silver medal – second place	2021	Sprint
Bronze medal – third place	2021	Individual Race
Russian Roller Ski Championships
Gold medal – first place	2010	Relay
Silver medal – second place	2015	Relay
Bronze medal – third place	2017	Individual Race
Bronze medal – third place	2017	Pursuit
Gold medal – first place	2021	Team Sprint
Gold medal – first place	2024	Team Sprint

Varvara Aleksandrovna Prokhorova (born 27 December 1991, Moscow) is a Russian skier.

== Biography ==
Varvara Prokhorova was born on 27 December 1991 in Moscow.

She holds the title of Master of Sports of Russia.

Prokhorova is a member of the Russian national team in roller skis.

She participated in the World Roller Ski Championships in 2017 in Shellefteo, Sweden, where she finished 8th in the mass start (16 km free style).

In 2021, Prokhorova became the Champion of Russia in roller skis in the relay (paired with Natalia Matveeva).

She also participated in the Roller Ski World Cup in 2021, competing in stages held in Banska Bystrica, Slovakia, Otepää, Estonia, and Madonna, Latvia.

In 2021, Prokhorova won three medals at stages of the Continental Cup in Cross-country Skiing: gold in Zlatibor, Serbia (5 km classic), and silver and bronze in Mavrovo, North Macedonia (5 km freestyle).

In 2024, Prokhorova again became the Champion of Russia in roller skis in the relay, this time paired with Viktoria Lukashova.

=== Elbrus Mountaineering ===
In June 2023, Prokhorova became the first person in the world to ascend Elbrus on cross-country skis. She began her ascent from the "Gara-Bashi" base camp at an altitude of 3750 meters and successfully reached the peak at 5642 meters. This ascent was recorded as a national achievement of Russia.

Prokhorova described the ascent as a significant personal achievement, requiring both physical preparation and careful planning. She also emphasized that her primary discipline remains cross-country skiing, although she continues to explore various extreme projects, such as ski mountaineering and obstacle races.

== Sports career ==
=== Cross-Country Skiing ===
She started cross-country skiing in 2001 at the age of 9. Her interest in skiing came from her older brother; before that, she practiced judo and rhythmic gymnastics. She took her first steps in skiing at SDYUSHOR Spartak, in the city of Elektrougli. In 2004, she became a prize-winner at the Moscow Junior Championship, and her first national competition was held in Syktyvkar. In 2007–2008, she was part of the Sakha Republic (Yakutia) national team. In the 2008/2009 season, she was invited to the Moscow national team to prepare for the All-Russian Student Games in Krasnoyarsk. As a junior, she participated in Russian Championships, stages of the Russian Cup, and the Continental Cup. As an adult, in addition to Russian competitions, she actively competes internationally in events such as: Visma Ski Classics, World Sprint Series, FIS Balkan Cup, China Tour de Ski, and the Worldloppet and Euroloppet marathons.

==== Russian competitions ====
Participant in the Russian Championships, All-Russian competitions, stages of the Russian Cup, the Championship of the regions, and the Russian Cross-Country Skiing Championships.

She was a member of the national teams of the Sakha Republic (Yakutia) and Moscow.

Winner of the All-Russian competitions in the sprint discipline (in Aldan).

==== International competitions ====
In the 2011/2012 season, she competed in her first international junior competitions in Muonio, Finland.

In the 2017/2018 season, she competed in the China Tour de Ski.

In the 2019/2020 season, she participated in the international sprint series World Sprint Series. She took third place at the Balkan Cup in Turkey.

In the 2020/2021 season, she competed in the Balkan Cup, securing her first victory in Zlatibor (Serbia), along with second and third places in Mavrovo (North Macedonia).

In the 2021/2022 season, she competed for the Austrian marathon team Ski-Willy Marathon Team Austria in the prestigious marathon series Visma Ski Classics.

==== Russialoppet Russian Ski Marathons ====
She started participating in the Russialoppet races in 2010. She has started in 35 races, repeatedly becoming a winner and prize-winner in ski marathons.

In 2018, she finished third in the overall standings of the Russialoppet Super Cup.

In 2021, she won the overall Russialoppet Super Cup.

==== Worldloppet and Euroloppet International Marathons ====
In Spain, she took two-second places at the Marxa Beret marathon (2019, 2022).

In 2019, she finished second in the Isafjordur marathon in Iceland.

==== Visma Ski Classics ====
In the spring of 2021, she was invited to join the professional Austrian marathon team Ski-Willy Marathon Team Austria to compete in the prestigious marathon series Visma Ski Classics. Varvara became the first Russian woman to join a foreign marathon team. Her first race for the Austrian team took place in November 2021 in Orsa, Sweden. In January 2022, she took second place in the La Venosta race in Italy, marking her first podium finish in Visma Ski Classics.

=== Roller Skiing ===
==== Junior and Youth Achievements ====
From a young age, she was a member of the Russian national Roller Skiing team.

Her debut in the Roller Skiing World Cup took place in Prato Nevoso (2010).

Her first victory came in the relay at the Russian Junior Championships.

==== Adult Achievements ====
She has competed in stages of the Russian Cup and the World Championships as part of the Russian roller skiing national team.

Champion and prize-winner in Russian competitions, as well as winner and prize-winner in stages of the Russian Roller Skiing Cup.

In 2013, she debuted in the adult category at the World Cup in Nizhny Novgorod, placing 11th in the mass start and 14th in the sprint.

In July 2015, at the Roller Skiing World Cup in Latvia, she finished 12th in the freestyle sprint, 10th in the 5 km classic race, and 10th in the freestyle pursuit.

In 2017, she placed 8th in the classic race at the World Roller Ski Championships in Sweden. That same year, at the World Cup in Trento, Italy, she finished 10th in the classic style race and 9th in the freestyle pursuit.

In 2018, she competed in five stages of the Roller Skiing World Cup. Sweden, Torsby (14th in the individual race, 14th in the pursuit, 7th in the mass start); Latvia, Madona (12th in the sprint, 12th in the individual race, 6th in the mass start); China, Baiyin (11th in the sprint, 16th in the individual race); Russia, Khanty-Mansiysk (15th in the sprint, 8th in the individual race, 18th in the mass start); Italy, Trento (10th in the sprint, 15th in the individual race, 10th in the pursuit, 6th in the mass start).

In 2019, she competed in four stages of the Roller Skiing World Cup. China, Beijing (32nd in the sprint, 36th in the mass start); Sweden, Trollhättan (8th in the sprint, 25th in the mass start); Russia, Khanty-Mansiysk (11th in the sprint, 9th in the individual race, 13th in the pursuit, 8th in the mass start); Italy, Trento (12th in the sprint, 15th in the individual race, 15th in the pursuit, 14th in the mass start).

In 2021, she competed in three stages of the Roller Skiing World Cup. Slovakia, Banská Bystrica (11th in the sprint and two 11th places in mass starts); Estonia, Tartu (5th in the mass start); Latvia, Madona (8th in the sprint, 9th in the mass start, and 11th in the individual race).

=== Mountaineering ===
She has been involved in mountaineering since 2013, completing 14 ascents of Elbrus. She became the champion of the Red Fox Elbrus Race (Speed Ascent to the Western Summit of Elbrus) in 2013, 2024, and was a prize-winner 2016, and also was winner of the ski mountaineering race 2023, 2024.

In the 2015/2016 season, she secured three victories in the Russian Cup (Sprint, Team Race, Individual Race), two third places in the Russian Cup, and third place at the Russian Championship. She finished third overall in the Russian Cup standings.

In 2015, she was invited to the CSKA team, her first participation in ski mountaineering competitions, and by 2022, she had won and taken two prizes at the Russian Championships. She holds the military rank of praporshchik of the Armed Forces of the Russian Federation.

In 2016, she participated in the Patrouille des Glaciers.

In February 2022, she debuted at the European Championship in the sprint discipline. At the Russian Championship in 2022, she took second place in the sprint and won in the relay.

=== Obstacle Racing ===
In 2015, she was invited to participate in the "Become a Human" race with crossfit elements. This sparked her interest in obstacle racing. She started with amateur competitions and eventually progressed to the European Championships, followed by the World Championships.

At the 2017 European Championship in Andorra, she ran in the AG Beast race, finishing first but was disqualified for losing her timing chip on the course.

In 2018, at the European Championship in France, she finished 5th and qualified for the World Championships.

She has participated twice in the SPARTAN RACE World Championship in the US, where she finished second in 2018 and won the category "Age Group" in 2019, becoming World Champion.

Prokhorova won the 2026 Seattle Spartan North American Championship Trifecta. Representing Team Extremus, she swept the overall Trifecta title across the September 19–20, 2026 weekend in Monroe, Washington with a cumulative time of 4:17:37 over 36 kilometers—finishing nearly 40 minutes ahead of her closest competitor.

== Achievements ==
=== World Championships ===
Roller Skiing
Roller Skiing	Mass Start
2017 Sollefteå	8th place

Obstacle Races
SPARTAN RACE	Gold	Silver	Bronze
2018	—	1	—
2019	1	—	—

=== World Cup ===
Roller Skiing World Cup	Sprint	Individual Race	Pursuit	Mass Start
2010 Prato Nevoso	4	—	—	—
2013 Nizhny Novgorod	14	—	—	11
2015 Madona	12	10	10	—
2017 Trento	—	10	9	—
2018 Torsby	—	14	14	7
2018 Madona	12	12	—	6
2018 Baiyin	11	16	—	—
2018 Khanty-Mansiysk	15	9	—	18
2018 Trento	10	15	10	6
2019 Beijing	32	—	—	36
2019 Trollhättan	8	—	—	25
2019 Khanty-Mansiysk	11	9	13	8
2019 Trento	12	15	15	14
2021 Banská Bystrica	11	—	—	11 + 11
2021 Tartu	—	—	—	5
2021 Madona	8	11	—	9

=== FIS International competitions ===
Year, Location	Category	Sprint	Individual Race	Marathon
2011 Moscow	FIS	18	—	—
2018 Jilin	FIS	7	—	—
2018 Changchun	FIS	6	—	8
2018 Yan'an	FIS	6	—	—
2018 Beijing	FIS	7	—	—
2019 Erzurum	FIS	2	5	—
2020 Zlatibor	FIS	2	4	—
2020 Cheile Gradistei-Fundata	FIS	—	7	—
2020 Mavrovo	Balcan Cup	—	7 + 6	—
2020 Dvorista – Pale	Balcan Cup	—	9 + 10	—
2020 Bolu	Balcan Cup	—	3 + 8	—
2021 Senica	Balcan Cup	—	4 + 4	—
2021 Zlatibor	Balcan Cup	—	1	—
2021 Mavrovo	Balcan Cup	—	3 + 2	—
2022 Malles Venosta	FIS	—	—	2

=== Russian competitions ===
Year, Location	Category	Sprint	Individual Race
2010 Seminsky Pass	PR 19–20	32	23
2010 Kirovsk (Murmansk Oblast)	WC	—	8 (C) + 8 (F)
2011 Moscow	NC	—	5
2015 Moscow	WC	9	
2016 Aldan	WC	1	5
2020 Novosibirsk	WC	6	—

=== Russialoppet Marathons ===
11 medals (2 gold, 3 silver, 6 bronze)

Season / Podium	Gold	Silver	Bronze
2012 / 2013	—	1	—
2013 / 2014	—	—	1
2014 / 2015	—	—	1
2016 / 2017	—	1	1
2017 / 2018	1	—	1
2018 / 2019	—	—	1
2020 / 2021	1	1	1

Russialoppet Super Cup
Season / Overall Standings	Gold	Silver	Bronze
2017 / 2018	—	—	1
2020 / 2021	1	—	—

=== Ski Mountaineering ===
European Championship
European Championships Skimo	Sprint
2022 Spain	25th place

Russian Championship
Season / Discipline	Sprint	Relay
2015 / 2016	6	
2021 / 2022	2	1

Russian Cup
Ski Mountaineering	Sprint	Individual Race	Team Race	Vertical Race
2016 Khibiny	1	1	1	—
2021 Beloretsk	2	3	—	—

3rd place overall in the Russian Cup 2015 / 2016.
