= Coralie Bentz =

French cross-country skier (born 1996)

Personal information
- Nationality: France
- Born: 21 May 1996 (age 30)

Sport
- Sport: Skiing
- Club: C. S. Argentière

World Cup career
- Seasons: 6 – (2018–present)
- Indiv. starts: 29
- Indiv. podiums: 0
- Team starts: 1
- Team podiums: 0
- Overall titles: 0 – (69th in 2022)
- Discipline titles: 0
- Updated on 27 March 2023

Coralie Bentz (born 21 May 1996) is a French cross-country skier. She competed in the Women's 10 kilometre classical, and Women's 15 kilometre skiathlon, at the 2022 Winter Olympics. She competed at the 2021–22 FIS Cross-Country World Cup.

== Cross-country skiing results ==
All results are sourced from the International Ski Federation (FIS).

=== Olympic Games ===
Year	Age	10 km individual	15 km skiathlon	30 km mass start	Sprint	4 × 5 km relay	Team sprint
2022	25	40	38	44	—	—	—

=== World Cup ===
==== Season standings ====
Season	Age	Discipline standings				Ski Tour standings			
Season	Age	Overall	Distance	Sprint	U23	Nordic Opening	Tour de Ski	Ski Tour 2020	World Cup Final
2018	21	NC	NC	—	NC	—	—	—N/a	—
2019	22	NC	NC	—	NC	—	—	—N/a	—
2020	23	94	67	NC	—N/a	—	—	DNF	—N/a
2021	24	NC	NC	NC	—N/a	—	DNF	—N/a	—N/a
2022	25	69	53	NC	—N/a	—N/a	29	—N/a	—N/a
2023	26	113	74	—	—N/a	—N/a	—	—N/a	—N/a
