= Anastasia Kirillova =

Belarusian cross country skier (born 1996)

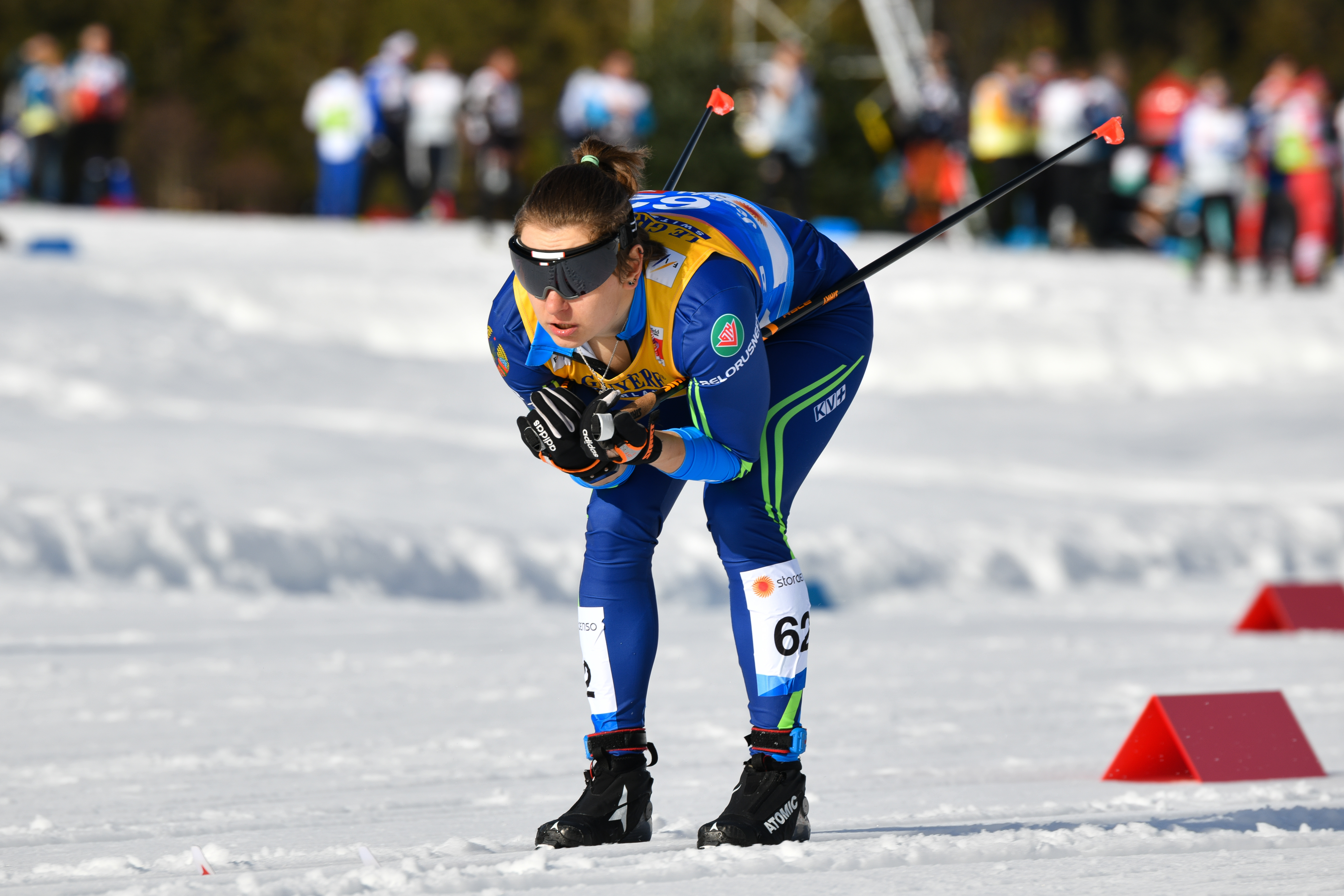
- Anastasia Kirillova in 2019

Personal information
- Nationality: Belarus
- Born: 20 February 1996 (age 30)

Sport
- Sport: Skiing

World Cup career
- Seasons: 6 – (2016–present)
- Indiv. starts: 28
- Indiv. podiums: 0
- Team starts: 2
- Team podiums: 0
- Overall titles: 0 – (87th in 2016)
- Discipline titles: 0
- Updated on 19 December 2021

Anastasia Sergeyevna Kirillova (Belarusian: Анастасія Сяргееўна Кірылава, Russian: Анастасия Сергеевна Кириллова; born 20 February 1996) is a Belarusian cross-country skier. She competed in the women's sprint at the 2018 Winter Olympics.

== Cross-country skiing results ==
All results are sourced from the International Ski Federation (FIS).

=== Olympic Games ===
Year	Age	10 km individual	15 km skiathlon	30 km mass start	Sprint	4 × 5 km relay	Team sprint
2018	22	—	—	—	40	14	—
2022	26	—	—	—	—	—	DNS

=== World Championships ===
Year	Age	10 km individual	15 km skiathlon	30 km mass start	Sprint	4 × 5 km relay	Team sprint
2019	23	61	—	—	42	—	9
2021	25	—	—	—	18	—	—

=== World Cup ===
==== Season standings ====
Season	Age	Discipline standings				Ski Tour standings				
Season	Age	Overall	Distance	Sprint	U23	Nordic Opening	Tour de Ski	Ski Tour 2020	World Cup Final	Ski Tour Canada
2016	20	87	NC	53	22	DNF	—	—N/a	—N/a	—
2017	21	111	—	84	25	—	—	—N/a	—	—N/a
2018	22	92	NC	63	14	DNF	DNF	—N/a	—	—N/a
2019	23	114	—	78	29	—	—	—N/a	—	—N/a
2020	24	NC	—	NC	—N/a	DNF	—	—	—N/a	—N/a
2021	25	114	NC	78	—N/a	—	—	—N/a	—N/a	—N/a
