= Viktorija Todorovska =

Macedonian cross-country skier (born 2000)

Personal information
- Nationality: Macedonian
- Born: 26 November 2000 (age 24)

Sport
- Sport: Cross-country skiing

Viktorija Todorovska (born 26 November 2000) is a Macedonian cross-country skier. She competed in the 2018 Winter Olympics.
