= Tímea Lőrincz =

Romanian cross-country skier (born 1992)

Personal information
- Born: 21 April 1992 (age 34) Gheorgheni, Romania
- Height: 5 ft 10 in (178 cm)

Sport
- Sport: Skiing
- Club: CSS Gheorgheni

Tímea Lőrincz (née Tímea Sára, born 21 April 1992) is a Romanian cross-country skier of ethnic Hungarian descent. She competed at the 2014 Winter Olympics in Sochi, in skiathlon and 10 km classical, and at the 2018 Winter Olympics in Pyeongchang, in sprint classical and 10 km freestyle.
