= Stefani Popova =

Bulgarian biathlete

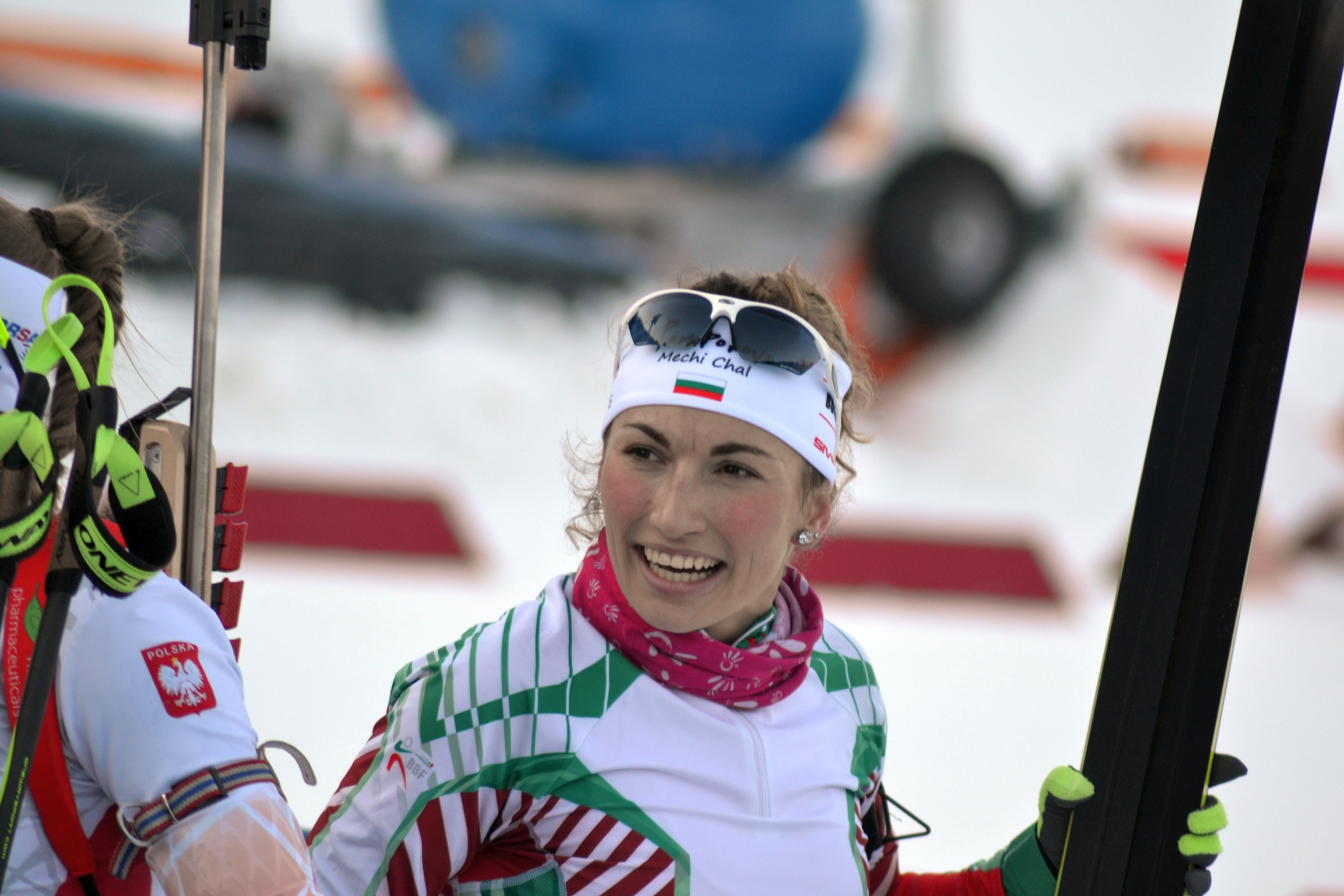
- Popova in 2017

Personal information
- Nationality: Bulgarian
- Born: 12 February 1993 (age 32); Troyan, Bulgaria

Sport
- Country: Bulgaria
- Sport: Biathlon

Stefani Popova (Bulgarian: Стефани Попова) (born 12 February 1993) is a Bulgarian biathlete.

== Early life ==
She was born in Troyan. She has competed in the Biathlon World Cup, and represented Bulgaria at the Biathlon World Championships 2016.

== Biathlon results ==
All results are sourced from the International Biathlon Union.

=== Olympic Games ===
0 medals

Event	Individual	Sprint	Pursuit	Mass start	Relay	Mixed relay
(South Korea) 2018 Pyeongchang	77th	—	—	—	16th	—

:

=== World Championships ===
0 medals

Event	Individual	Sprint	Pursuit	Mass start	Relay	Mixed relay
(Czech Republic) 2013 Nové Město	91st	—	—	—	LAP	—
(Finland) 2015 Kontiolahti	86th	102nd	—	—	23rd	—
(Norway) 2016 Oslo	80th	96th	—	—	20th	—
(Austria) 2017 Hochfilzen	—	94th	—	—	22nd	—

*During Olympic seasons competitions are only held for those events not included in the Olympic program.
