= Anja Ilić =

Serbian cross-country skier (born 1998)

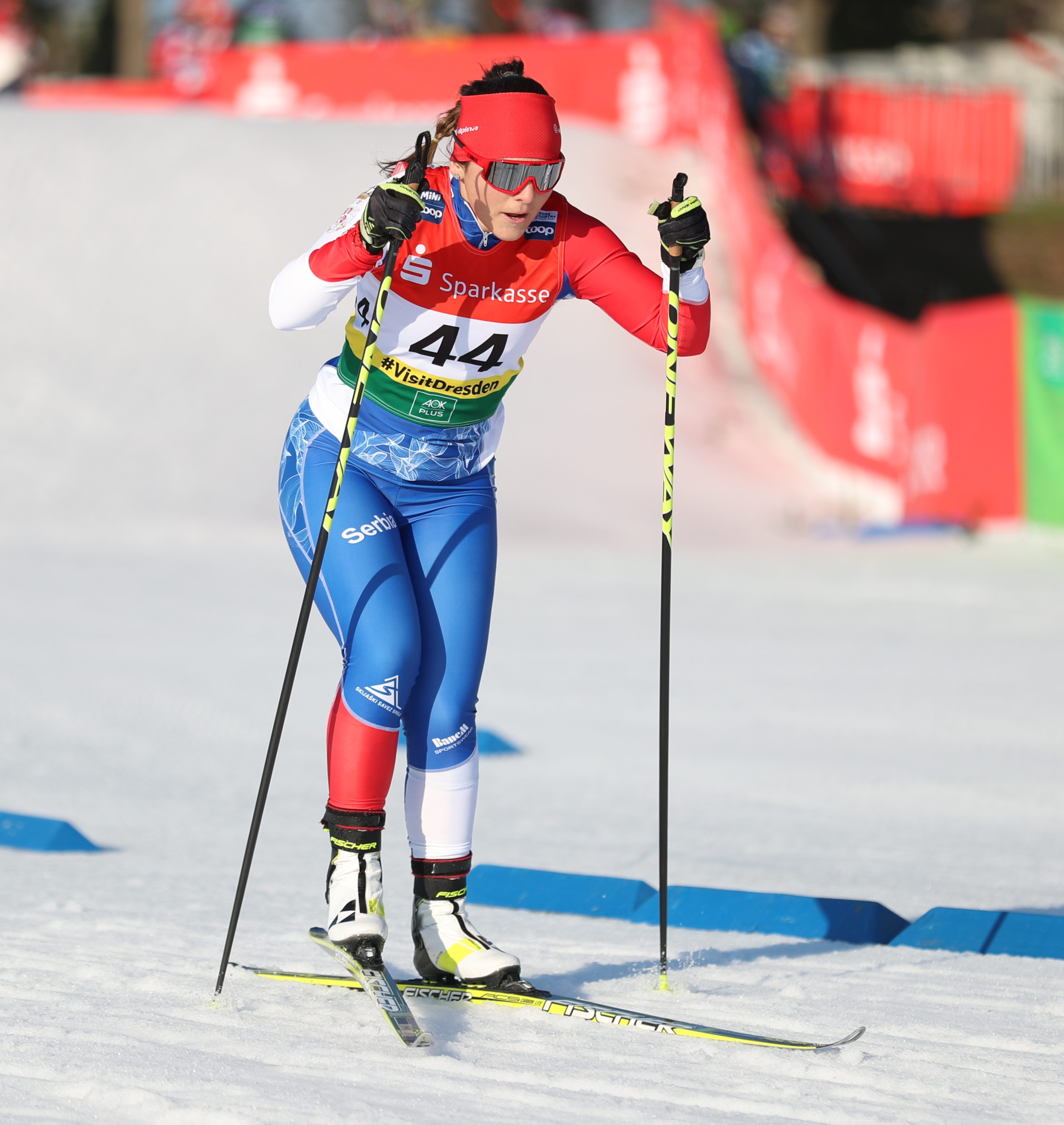

Personal information
- Born: 30 October 1998 (age 27) Užice, SR Yugoslavia

Anja Ilić (Serbian Cyrillic: Ања Илић; born 30 October 1998) is cross-country skier from Serbia. She represented Serbia at the 2026 Winter Olympics and was also a flag bearer on the opening of the games.
