= Daniela Kadeva =

Bulgarian biathlete (born 1994)

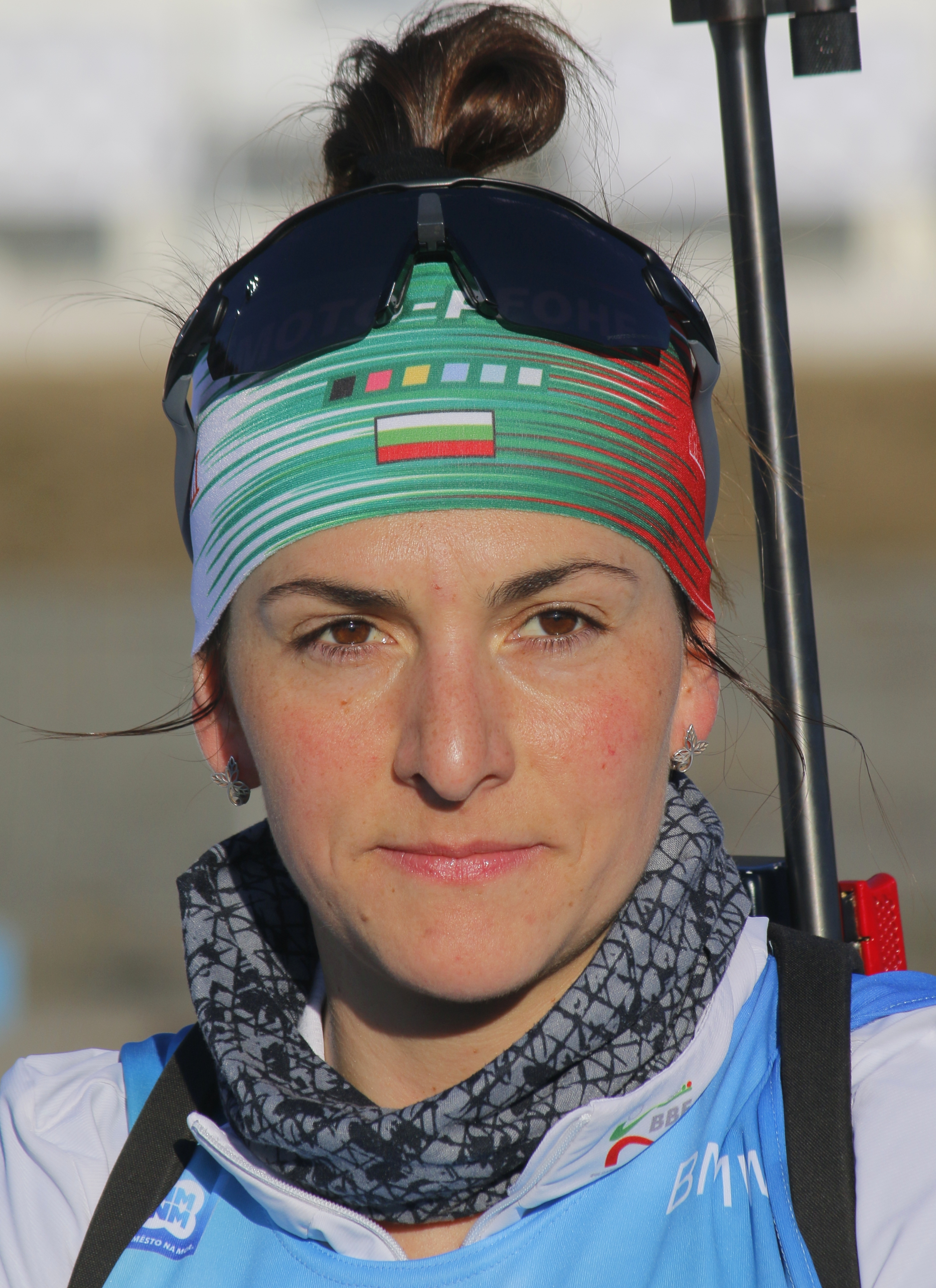
- Kadeva in 2023

Personal information
- Full name: Daniela L. Kadeva
- Born: 1 January 1994 (age 32) Bansko, Bulgaria
- Height: 174 cm (5 ft 9 in)
- Weight: 67 kg (148 lb)

Sport

Professional information
- Sport: Biathlon

Daniela L. Kadeva (Bulgarian: Даниела Кадева, born 1 January 1994) is a former Bulgarian biathlete. She represented Bulgaria at the Biathlon World Championships 2015 in Kontiolahti.

== Biathlon results ==
All results are sourced from the International Biathlon Union.

=== Olympic Games ===
0 medals

Event	Individual	Sprint	Pursuit	Mass start	Relay	Mixed relay
(South Korea) 2018 Pyeongchang	53rd	72nd	—	—	16th	17th
(China) 2022 Beijing	86th	84th	—	—	18th	—

=== World Championships ===
0 medals

Event	Individual	Sprint	Pursuit	Mass start	Relay	Mixed relay	Single mixed relay
(Austria) 2017 Hochfilzen	72nd	—	—	—	22nd	—	—
(Sweden) 2019 Östersund	54th	67th	—	—	20th	21st	19th
(Italy) 2020 Rasen-Antholz	36th	81st	—	—	20th	24th	—
(Slovenia) 2021 Pokljuka	53rd	88th	—	—	18th	15th	—
(Germany) 2023 Oberhof	72nd	—	—	—	—	—	20th

*During Olympic seasons competitions are only held for those events not included in the Olympic program.
**The single mixed relay was added as an event in 2019.
