= Veselin Tzinzov =

Bulgarian cross-country skier (born 1986)

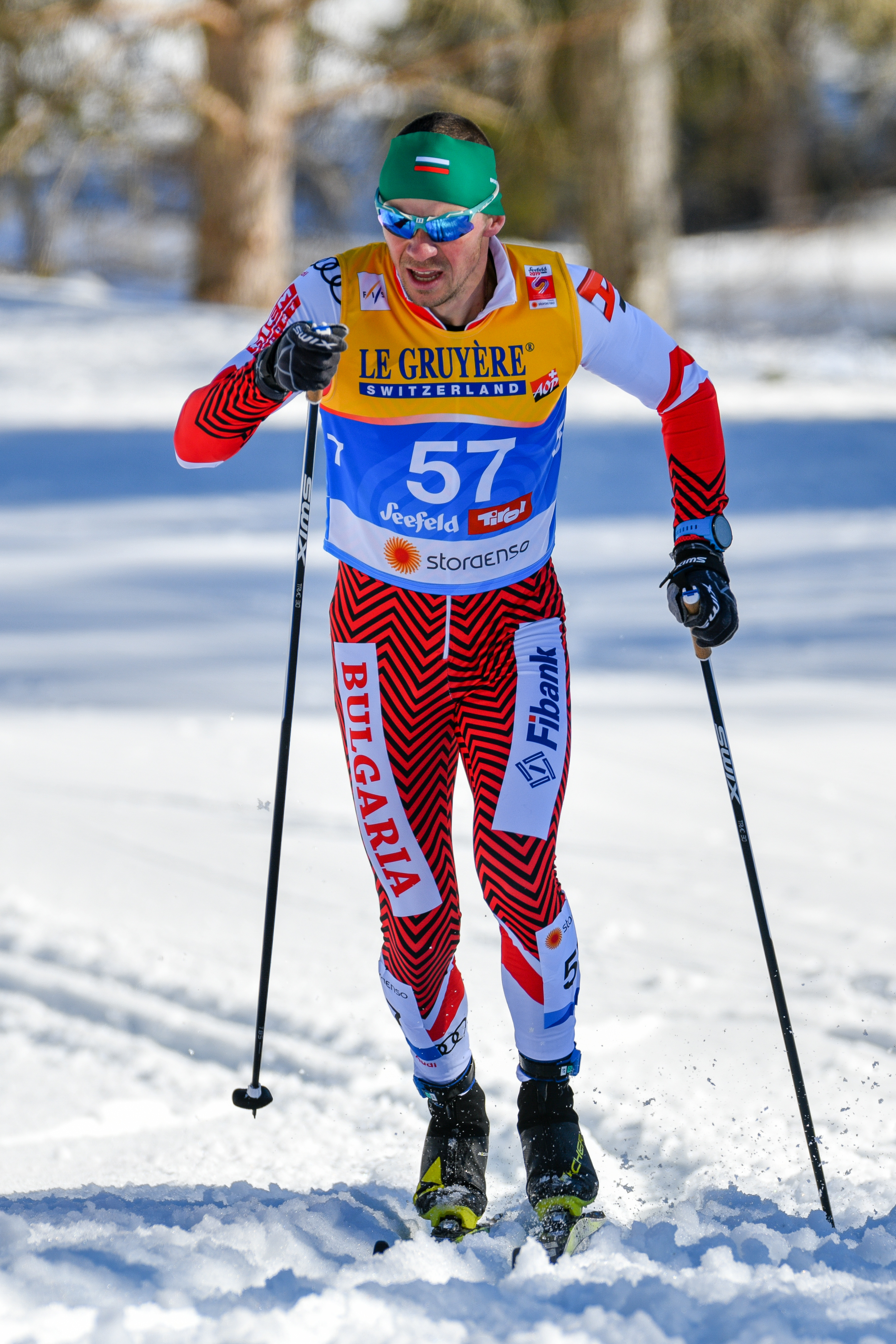
Tzinzov in February 2019

Veselin Tzinzov (Bulgarian: Веселин Цинзов, born 29 July 1986) is a Bulgarian cross-country skier who has competed since 2004. At the 2010 Winter Olympics in Vancouver, he finished 50th in the 15 km event while not finishing the 30 km mixed pursuit event.

Tzinzov's best finish at the FIS Nordic World Ski Championships was 22nd in the team sprint at Oberstdorf in 2005.

His best World Cup finish was 21st in a 30 km mixed pursuit race in Russia in January 2010.
