= Desislava Stoyanova =

Bulgarian biathlete (born 1992)

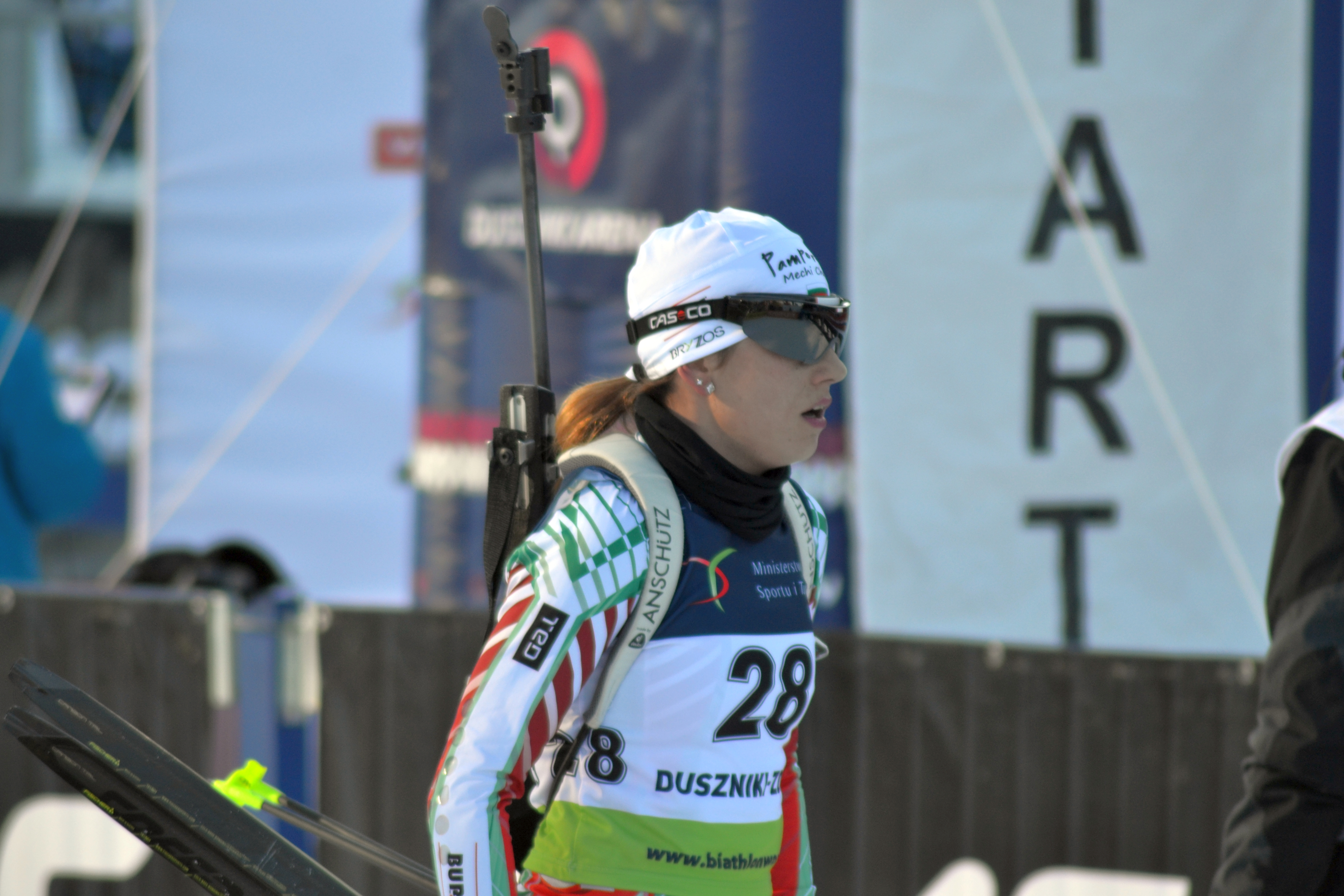
Stoyanova at ECH 2017

Desislava Stoyanova (Bulgarian: Десислава Стоянова); born 10 April 1992) is a retired Bulgarian biathlete. She was born in Berkovitsa. She competed at six Biathlon World Championships between 2011 and 2017, and at the 2014 and 2018 Winter Olympics. Her best individual result in the Biathlon World Cup is a 22nd place in the sprint. Her best individual result at the World Championships is 38th in the sprint at the Biathlon World Championships 2015. Her best Olympic individual result is the 61st place in the sprint at the 2014 Winter Olympics. She is engaged to fellow biathlete Dimitar Gerdzhikov from whom she has one child.

== Biathlon results ==
All results are sourced from the International Biathlon Union.

=== Olympic Games ===
0 medals

Event	Individual	Sprint	Pursuit	Mass start	Relay	Mixed relay
(Russia) 2014 Sochi	72nd	61st	—	—	—	—
(South Korea) 2018 Pyeongchang	79th	76th	—	—	16th	—

=== World Championships ===
0 medals

Event	Individual	Sprint	Pursuit	Mass start	Relay	Mixed relay	Single mixed relay
(Russia) 2011 Khanty-Mansiysk	—	95th	—	—	12th	24th	
(Germany) 2012 Ruhpolding	79th	94th	—	—	17th	—	
(Czech Republic) 2013 Nové Město	108th	88th	—	—	LAP	—	
(Finland) 2015 Kontiolahti	98th	37th	45th	—	23rd	18th	
(Norway) 2016 Oslo	55th	56th	49th	—	20th	16th	
(Austria) 2017 Hochfilzen	88th	70th	—	—	22nd	17th	
(Sweden) 2019 Östersund	72nd	79th	—	—	20th	—	—

*During Olympic seasons competitions are only held for those events not included in the Olympic program.
**The single mixed relay was added as an event in 2019.
