= Edi Dadić =

Croatian cross-country skier (born 1993)

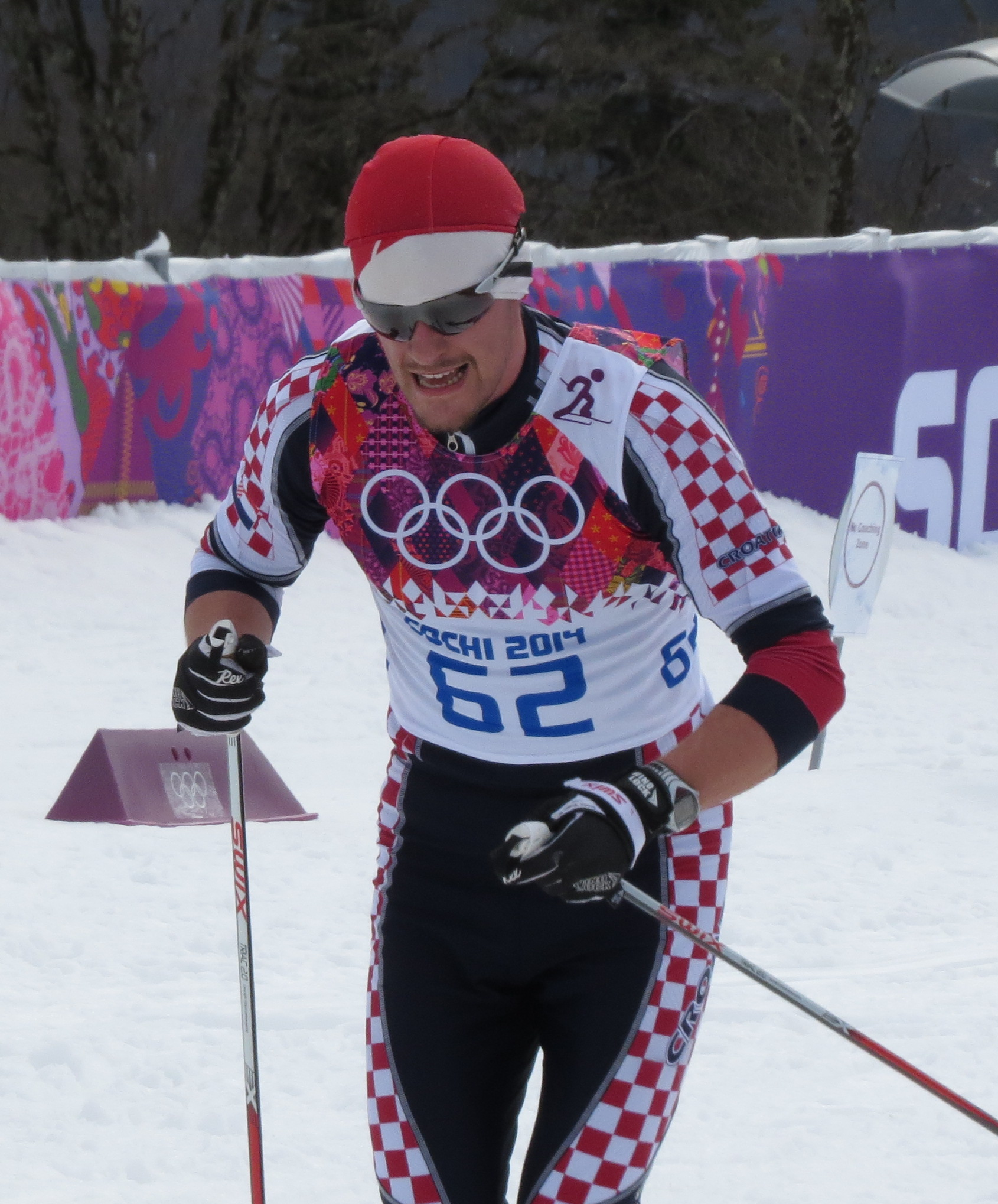

Personal information
- Born: 22 December 1993 (age 32) Rijeka, Croatia
- Height: 1.83 m (6 ft 0 in)
- Weight: 79 kg (174 lb)

Sport
- Country: Croatia
- Sport: Cross-country skiing

Edi Dadić (Croatian pronunciation: [ědi dǎːditɕ]; born 22 December 1993 in Rijeka, Croatia) is a cross-country skier from Croatia. He competed for Croatia, at Winter olimpics 2014 and Winter olimpics 2018.
