= Yordan Chuchuganov =

Bulgarian cross-country skier

Personal information
- Born: 1996 (age 29–30)

Sport
- Country: Bulgaria
- Sport: Cross-Country Skiing

Yordan Chuchuganov (Bulgarian: Йордан Чучуганов) is a Bulgarian cross-country skier. Chuchuganov was born on 25 February 1996. He debuted in the FIS World Cup in 2014 and participated at the 2015 and 2017 World Ski Championships. He missed the 2014 Winter Olympics because of injury following an accident. He participated at the 2017 Winter Universiade and qualified for the 2018 Winter Olympics.
