= Antoniya Grigorova =

Bulgarian cross-country skier (born 1986)

Antonia Grigorova (Bulgarian: Антония Григорова) (born 7 December 1986 in Varna) is a Bulgarian cross-country skier who has competed since 2004. At the 2010 Winter Olympics in Vancouver, she finished 60th in the 10 km and 62nd in the 15 km mixed pursuit event. Four years later, at the Sochi Olympics, she represented her country in the 15 km cross-country skiing, finishing in 56th place.

At the FIS Nordic World Ski Championships 2009 in Liberec, Grigorova finished 54th in the 30 km, 67th in the individual sprint, 74th in the individual sprint, and was lapped in the 15 km mixed pursuit event.

Her best World Cup finish was 76th twice, both in 10 km events (2008, 2010).
