= Petrică Hogiu =

Romanian cross-country skier (born 1991)

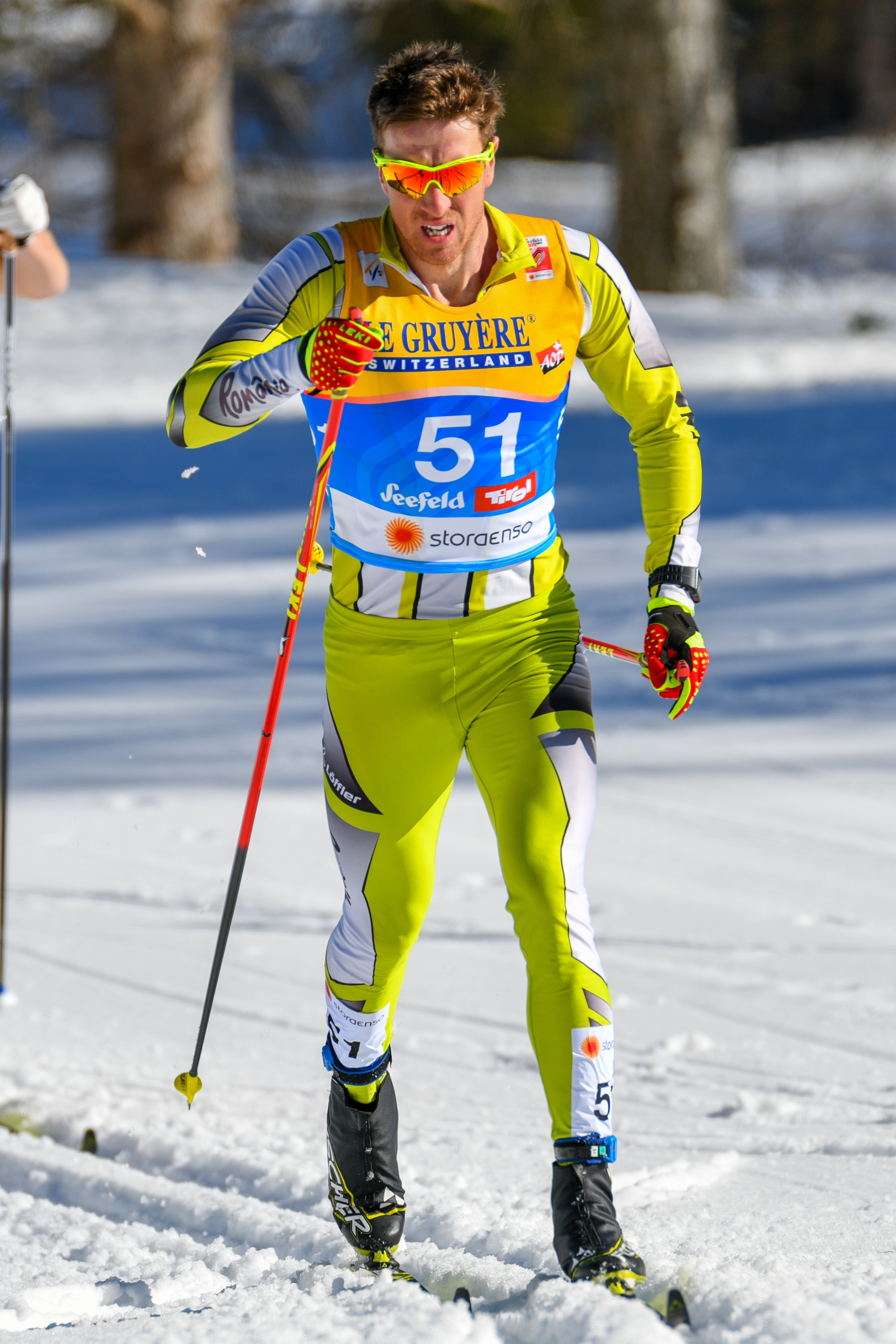
Petrică Hogiu in February 2019

Petrică Hogiu (born 16 June 1991) is a Romanian cross-country skier who has been competing since 2007. At the 2010 Winter Olympics in Vancouver, he finished 17th in the team sprint and 57th in the 15 km events.

Hogiu's best finish has been second on six occasions in lesser events since 2008.

He was born in Bistriţa.
