= Vedrana Malec =

Croatian cross-country skier (born 1990)

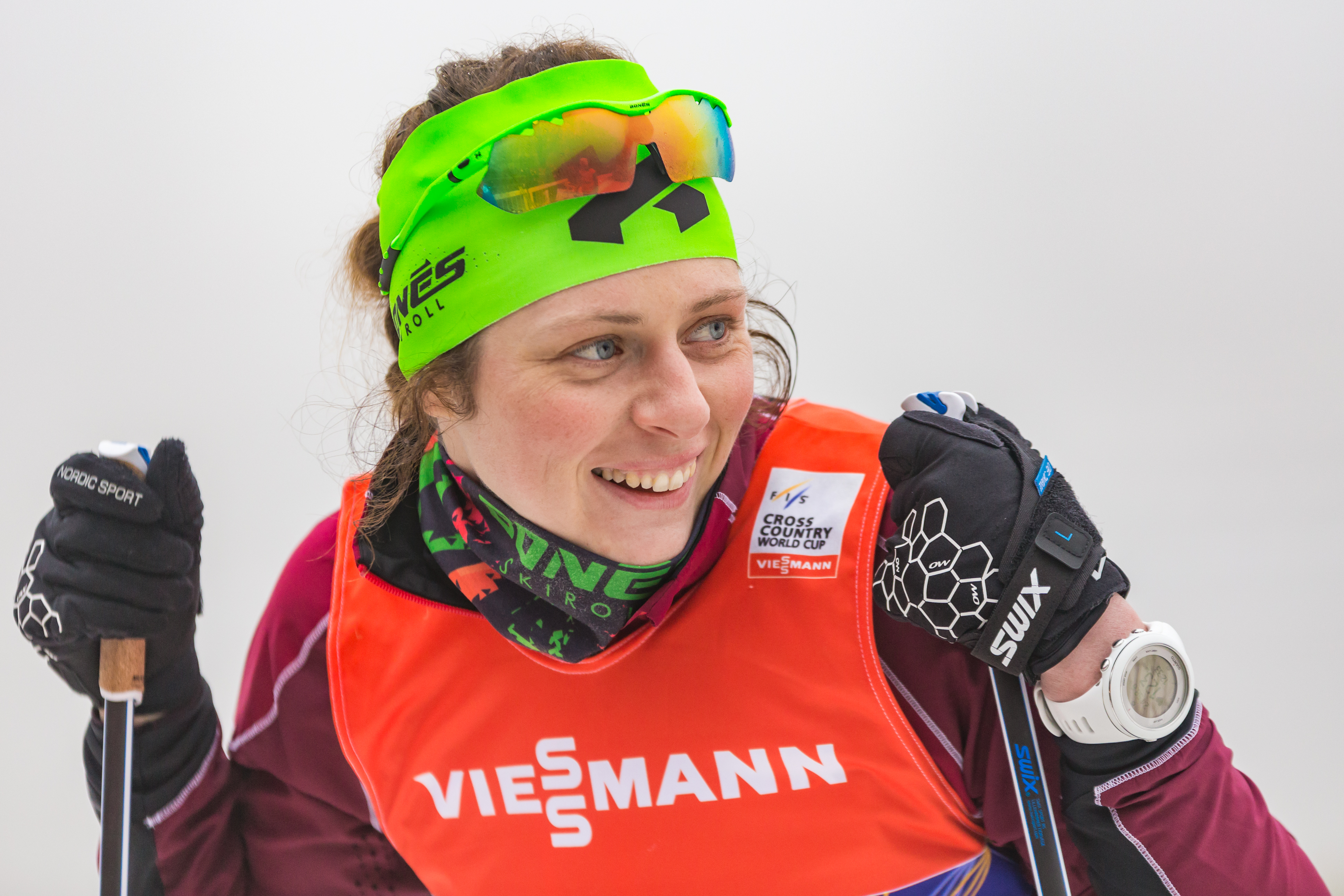
- Malec at the FIS Cross-Country World Cup Dresden, January 2018

Personal information
- Born: 24 March 1990 (age 35) Zagreb, Croatia
- Height: 1.71 m (5 ft 7 in)
- Weight: 61 kg (134 lb)

Vedrana Malec (Croatian pronunciation: [ʋědrana mâlets]; born 24 March 1990) is a Croatian cross-country skier who has been competing since 2006. She competed at the 2014 Winter Olympics in Sochi, which was her first Winter Olympics. She was selected to carry the Croatian flag at the closing ceremony of the 2014 Winter Olympics.

Malec has competed at two Nordic World Ski Championships. Her best finish is 58th place in skiathlon event at the 2013 Nordic World Ski Championships. She won the 2012/13 edition of the FIS Balkan Cup in cross-country skiing, becoming the first Croatian cross-country skier to do so. She has competed three times in the Cross-Country World Cup. She has also competed at the 2013 Winter Universiade, where her best result was 30th place in the women's skiathlon.

Malec finished 59th in women's skiathlon at the 2014 Winter Olympics, her first race of the games. Three days later, Malec finished 61st in the qualification of women's sprint race, failing to qualify for the elimination stages. On day 6, she competed in 10 km classical race. She finished 59th, more than five minutes behind the race winner Justyna Kowalczyk of Poland. Her best result came in the last event of the women's program, 30 km freestyle mass start event, where she finished 53rd.

Malec also studied journalism at the University of Zagreb.
