= 2019–20 FIS Cross-Country Eastern Europe Cup =

Discipline	Men	Women
Overall	(Russia) Ermil Vokuev	(Russia) Yevgeniya Shapovalova

Competition
Locations	5 venues	5 venues
Individual	13 events	13 events
Cancelled	7 events	7 events

The 2018–19 Eastern Europe Cup was a season of the FIS Cross-Country Eastern Europe Cup, a Continental Cup season in cross-country skiing for men and women. The season began on 12 November 2019 in Shchuchinsk, Kazakhstan and concluded on 1 March 2020 in Kononovskaya, Russia.

== Calendar ==
=== Men ===
Key: C – Classic / F – Freestyle
Period	Race	Date	Place	Discipline	Winner	Second	Third	Ref.
I	1	12 November 2019	(Kazakhstan) Shchuchinsk	Sprint C	(Russia) Andrey Parfenov	(Russia) Ermil Vokuev	(Russia) Alexander Panzhinskiy	
I	2	13 November 2019	(Kazakhstan) Shchuchinsk	10 km C	(Russia) Ermil Vokuev	(Russia) Andrey Parfenov	(Kazakhstan) Konstantin Bortsov	
I	3	14 November 2019	(Kazakhstan) Shchuchinsk	10 km F	(Kazakhstan) Vitaliy Pukhkalo	(Russia) Stanislav Volzhentsev	(Russia) Artem Nikolayev	
I	4	29 November 2019	(Russia) Vershina Tyoi	Sprint C	(Russia) Sergey Ardashev	(Russia) Ermil Vokuev	(Russia) Alexey Vitsenko	
I	5	30 November 2019	(Russia) Vershina Tyoi	15 km F	(Russia) Alexey Vitsenko	(Russia) Almaz Taipov	(Russia) Vladimir Frolov	
I	6	2 December 2019	(Russia) Vershina Tyoi	Sprint F	(Russia) Andrey Krasnov	(Russia) Denis Filimonov	(Russia) Ivan Kirillov	
I	7	3 December 2019	(Russia) Vershina Tyoi	15 km C	(Russia) Ivan Kirillov	(Russia) Alexey Vitsenko	(Russia) Alexander Bessmertnykh	
II		25 December 2019	(Russia) Krasnogorsk	15 km C	Cancelled, rescheduled to Syktyvkar 7–9 February 2020 and Moscow 23 February 2020			
II		26 December 2019	(Russia) Krasnogorsk	Sprint F	Cancelled, rescheduled to Syktyvkar 7–9 February 2020 and Moscow 23 February 2020			
II		28 December 2019	(Russia) Krasnogorsk	Sprint C	Cancelled, rescheduled to Syktyvkar 7–9 February 2020 and Moscow 23 February 2020			
II		29 December 2019	(Russia) Krasnogorsk	30 km F	Cancelled, rescheduled to Syktyvkar 7–9 February 2020 and Moscow 23 February 2020			
III		16 January 2020	(Belarus) Minsk/Raubichi	Sprint F	Cancelled, not rescheduled			
III		17 January 2020	(Belarus) Minsk/Raubichi	10 km C	Cancelled, not rescheduled			
III		19 January 2020	(Belarus) Minsk/Raubichi	Sprint C	Cancelled, not rescheduled			
III	8	7 February 2020	(Russia) Syktyvkar	15 km F	(Russia) Artem Nikolayev	(Russia) Ivan Kirillov	(Russia) Mikhail Sosnin	
III	9	9 February 2020	(Russia) Syktyvkar	Sprint C	(Russia) Ermil Vokuev	(Russia) Alexey Vitsenko	(Russia) Sergey Kanev	
IV	10	23 February 2020	(Russia) Moscow	Sprint F	(Norway) Kasper Stadaas	(Russia) Alexey Vitsenko	(France) Clement Arnault	
V	11	26 February 2020	(Russia) Kononovskaya	15 km F	(Russia) Artem Nikolayev	(Russia) Ilia Poroshkin	(Russia) Anton Timashov	
V	12	27 February 2020	(Russia) Kononovskaya	Sprint C	(Russia) Andrey Krasnov	(Russia) Fedor Nazarov	(Russia) Alexey Vitsenko	
V	13	1 March 2020	(Russia) Kononovskaya	30 km Skiathlon	(Russia) Alexey Shemiakin	(Russia) Ilia Poroshkin	(Russia) Stanislav Volzhentsev	

=== Women ===
Key: C – Classic / F – Freestyle
Period	Race	Date	Place	Discipline	Winner	Second	Third	Ref.
I	1	12 November 2019	(Kazakhstan) Shchuchinsk	Sprint C	(Belarus) Anastasia Kirillova	(Russia) Yevgeniya Shapovalova	(Russia) Hristina Matsokina	
I	2	13 November 2019	(Kazakhstan) Shchuchinsk	5 km C	(Belarus) Anastasia Kirillova	(Russia) Darya Rogozina	(Kazakhstan) Nataliya Barakina	
I	3	14 November 2019	(Kazakhstan) Shchuchinsk	5 km F	(Russia) Yekaterina Smirnova	(Russia) Nina Dubotolkina	(Russia) Yevgeniya Shapovalova	
I	4	29 November 2019	(Russia) Vershina Tyoi	Sprint C	(Russia) Yevgeniya Shapovalova	(Russia) Hristina Matsokina	(Russia) Olga Kucheruk	
I	5	30 November 2019	(Russia) Vershina Tyoi	10 km F	(Russia) Alena Perevozchikova	(Russia) Nina Dubotolkina	(Russia) Maya Yakunina	
I	6	2 December 2019	(Russia) Vershina Tyoi	Sprint F	(Russia) Hristina Matsokina	(Russia) Maya Yakunina	(Russia) Olga Kucheruk	
I	7	3 December 2019	(Russia) Vershina Tyoi	10 km C	(Russia) Yevgeniya Shapovalova	(Russia) Lilya Vasilyeva	(Russia) Aliya Iksanova	
II		25 December 2019	(Russia) Krasnogorsk	10 km C	Cancelled, rescheduled to Syktyvkar 7–9 February 2020 and Moscow 23 February 2020			
II		26 December 2019	(Russia) Krasnogorsk	Sprint F	Cancelled, rescheduled to Syktyvkar 7–9 February 2020 and Moscow 23 February 2020			
II		28 December 2019	(Russia) Krasnogorsk	Sprint C	Cancelled, rescheduled to Syktyvkar 7–9 February 2020 and Moscow 23 February 2020			
II		29 December 2019	(Russia) Krasnogorsk	15 km F	Cancelled, rescheduled to Syktyvkar 7–9 February 2020 and Moscow 23 February 2020			
III		16 January 2020	(Belarus) Minsk/Raubichi	Sprint F	Cancelled, not rescheduled			
III		17 January 2020	(Belarus) Minsk/Raubichi	5 km C	Cancelled, not rescheduled			
III		19 January 2020	(Belarus) Minsk/Raubichi	Sprint C	Cancelled, not rescheduled			
III	8	7 February 2020	(Russia) Syktyvkar	10 km F	(Russia) Marina Chernousova	(Russia) Viktoria Kalinina	(Russia) Alena Perevozchikova	
III	9	9 February 2020	(Russia) Syktyvkar	Sprint C	(Russia) Yevgeniya Shapovalova	(Russia) Olga Tsareva	(Russia) Lilya Vasilyeva	
IV	10	23 February 2020	(Russia) Moscow	Sprint F	(Russia) Anastasia Moskalenko	(Russia) Lilya Vasilyeva	(Russia) Anastasia Vlasova	
V	11	26 February 2020	(Russia) Kononovskaya	10 km F	(Russia) Yekaterina Smirnova	(Russia) Alena Perevozchikova	(Russia) Marina Chernousova	
V	12	27 February 2020	(Russia) Kononovskaya	Sprint C	(Russia) Yevgeniya Shapovalova	(Russia) Olga Kucheruk	(Russia) Lilya Vasilyeva	
V	13	1 March 2020	(Russia) Kononovskaya	15 km Skiathlon	(Russia) Anastasia Rygalina	(Russia) Lilya Vasilyeva	(Russia) Lali Kvaratskhelia	

== Overall standings ==
=== Men's overall standings ===
Rank		Points
1	(Russia) Ermil Vokuev	611
2	(Russia) Alexey Vitsenko	532
3	(Russia) Artem Nikolayev	451
4	(Russia) Ivan Kirillov	450
5	(Russia) Stanislav Volzhentsev	352
6	(Russia) Andrey Krasnov	298
7	(Russia) Andrey Parfenov	296
8	(Russia) Andrey Feller	258
9	(Russia) Anton Timashov	207
10	(Russia) Vladimir Frolov	202

=== Women's overall standings ===
Rank		Points
1	(Russia) Yevgeniya Shapovalova	731
2	(Russia) Lilya Vasilyeva	647
3	(Russia) Hristina Matsokina	368
4	(Russia) Olga Kucheruk	359
5	(Russia) Marina Chernousova	356
6	(Russia) Anastasia Moskalenko	336
7	(Russia) Alena Perevozchikova	316
8	(Russia) Viktoria Kalinina	305
9	(Russia) Anastasia Vlasova	278
10	(Russia) Yekaterina Smirnova	248
