= FIS Cross-Country Eastern Europe Cup =

Series of cross-country skiing event in Eastern Europe

- Genre: Cross-country skiing
- Date: Northern wintertime season
- Begins: November
- Ends: March
- Locations: Belarus; Kazakhstan; Russia; Ukraine
- Inaugurated: 2007
- Organiser: International Ski Federation
- 2019–20 FIS Cross-Country Eastern Europe Cup

The FIS Cross-Country Eastern Europe Cup (EEC) is a series of cross-country skiing events arranged by the International Ski Federation (FIS). It is one of the nine FIS Cross-Country Continental Cups, a second-level competition ranked below the World Cup. The Eastern Europe Cup is open for competitors from all nations, but are mainly a competition for skiers from four nations in Eastern Europe; Belarus, Kazakhstan, Russia and Ukraine.

The Eastern Europe Cup has been held since the 2007–08 season, and has been a part of the Cross-Country Continental Cup since then.

== World Cup qualification ==
In the end of certain periods, the overall leaders for both genders receive a place in the World Cup in the following period. The overall winners of the season receive a place in the World Cup in the beginning of the following season.

== Overall winners ==
=== Men ===
Season	Winner	Second	Third
2007–08	(Russia) Nikita Kryukov	(Russia) Igor Ussatchov	(Russia) Alexander Kuznetsov
2008–09	(Russia) Stanislav Volzhentsev (1)	(Russia) Anton Gafarov	(Russia) Dmitriy Osinkin
2009–10	(Russia) Ivan Alypov	(Russia) Konstantin Glavatskikh	(Russia) Dmitriy Chvanov
2010–11	(Russia) Anton Gafarov	(Russia) Andrey Parfenov	(Russia) Alexander Bessmertnykh
2011–12	(Russia) Gleb Retivykh	(Russia) Stanislav Volzhentsev	(Russia) Sergey Shiriayev
2012–13	(Russia) Sergey Novikov	(Russia) Vladimir Skobelev	(Russia) Sergey Shiriayev
2013–14	(Russia) Sergey Turyshev	(Russia) Alexander Utkin	(Russia) Nikolay Khokhryakov
2014–15	(Russia) Andrey Parfenov	(Russia) Konstantin Glavatskikh	(Russia) Alexander Utkin
2015–16	(Russia) Yevgeny Dementyev	(Russia) Mikhail Devyatyarov Jr.	(Russia) Nikita Stupak
2016–17	(Russia) Alexey Vitsenko	(Russia) Nikita Stupak	(Russia) Andrey Feller
2017–18	(Russia) Stanislav Volzhentsev (2)	(Russia) Ermil Vokuev	(Russia) Andrey Parfenov
2018–19	(Russia) Ilia Poroshkin	(Russia) Ermil Vokuev	(Russia) Ilia Semikov
2019–20	(Russia) Ermil Vokuev	(Russia) Alexey Vitsenko	(Russia) Artem Nikolayev
2020–21	(Russia) Andrey Larkov	(Russia) Anton Timashov	(Russia) Andrey Krasnov

=== Women ===
Season	Winner	Second	Third
2007–08	(Russia) Marina Chernousova	(Russia) Anna Slepova	(Russia) Olga Mikhailova
2008–09	(Russia) Olga Mikhailova	(Russia) Olga Schuchkina	(Russia) Larisa Kurkina
2009–10	(Russia) Olga Schuchkina	(Russia) Valentyna Novikova	(Russia) Olga Mikhailova
2010–11	(Russia) Anastasia Kazakul	(Russia) Polina Kalsina	(Russia) Olga Mikhailova
2011–12	(Russia) Yelena Soboleva (1)	(Russia) Olga Rocheva	(Russia) Yevgeniya Shapovalova
2012–13	(Russia) Yelena Soboleva (2)	(Russia) Marina Chernousova	(Russia) Darya Vedenina
2013–14	(Russia) Natalya Korostelyova	(Russia) Alisa Zhambalova	(Russia) Yuliya Belorukova
2014–15	(Russia) Natalya Matveyeva	(Russia) Yelena Soboleva	(Russia) Yuliya Chekalyova
2015–16	(Russia) Yelena Soboleva (3)	(Russia) Darya Vedenina	(Russia) Anastasia Vlasova
2016–17	(Russia) Anna Nechaevskaya	(Russia) Maria Davydenkova	(Russia) Natalya Ilina
2017–18	(Russia) Polina Nekrasova (Russia) Larisa Ryasina		(Russia) Maria Davydenkova
2018–19	(Russia) Olga Zareva	(Russia) Alisa Zhambalova	(Russia) Diana Golovan
2019–20	(Russia) Yevgeniya Shapovalova	(Russia) Lilia Vasilieva	(Russia) Hristina Matsokina
2020–21	(Russia) Lilia Vasilieva	(Belarus) Anastasia Kirillova (Russia) Anastasia Moskalenko	
