= 2018–19 FIS Cross-Country Eastern Europe Cup =

Discipline	Men	Women
Overall	(Russia) Ilia Poroshkin	(Russia) Olga Tsareva

Competition
Locations	5 venues	5 venues
Individual	16 events	16 events

The 2018–19 Eastern Europe Cup was a season of the FIS Cross-Country Eastern Europe Cup, a Continental Cup season in cross-country skiing for men and women. The season began on 22 November 2018 in Vershina Tyoi, Russia and concluded on 27 February 2019 in Syktyvkar, Russia.

== Calendar ==
=== Men ===
Key: C – Classic / F – Freestyle
Period	Race	Date	Place	Discipline	Winner	Second	Third	Ref.
I	1	22 November 2018	(Russia) Vershina Tyoi	Sprint C	(Russia) Ilia Poroshkin	(Russia) Alexey Vitsenko	(Russia) Sergey Ardashev	
I	2	23 November 2018	(Russia) Vershina Tyoi	10 km F	(Russia) Alexander Bessmertnykh	(Russia) Roman Tarasov	(Russia) Ivan Kirillov	
I	3	25 November 2018	(Russia) Vershina Tyoi	Sprint F	(Russia) Alexander Terentev	(Russia) Andrey Parfenov	(Russia) Denis Filimonov	
I	4	26 November 2018	(Russia) Vershina Tyoi	15 km C	(Russia) Sergey Ardashev	(Russia) Alexander Bessmertnykh	(Russia) Ilia Poroshkin	
II	5	22 December 2018	(Russia) Krasnogorsk	Sprint C	(Russia) Ermil Vokuev	(Russia) Sergey Ardashev	(Russia) Ilia Semikov	
II	6	23 December 2018	(Russia) Krasnogorsk	15 km F	(Russia) Ivan Yakimushkin	(Russia) Artem Maltsev	(Russia) Ilia Poroshkin	
II	7	25 December 2018	(Russia) Krasnogorsk	Sprint F	(Russia) Ivan Yakimushkin	(Russia) Alexander Terentev	(Russia) Ermil Vokuev	
II	8	26 December 2018	(Russia) Krasnogorsk	30 km C	(Russia) Alexander Bessmertnykh	(Russia) Ilia Semikov	(Russia) Alexey Vitsenko	
III	9	10 January 2019	(Belarus) Raubichi	Sprint C	(Russia) Ilia Semikov	(Belarus) Aliaksandr Voranau	(Russia) Ermil Vokuev	
III	10	11 January 2019	(Belarus) Raubichi	10 km C	(Russia) Ermil Vokuev	(Russia) Artem Nikolayev	(Russia) Ilia Poroshkin	
III	11	13 January 2019	(Belarus) Raubichi	15 km F	(Russia) Ilia Poroshkin	(Russia) Artem Nikolayev	(Russia) Ilia Semikov	
IV	12	8 February 2019	(Russia) Krasnogorsk	15 km C	(Russia) Andrey Parfenov	(Russia) Artem Nikolayev	(Russia) Ilia Poroshkin	
IV	13	10 February 2019	(Russia) Krasnogorsk	Sprint F	(Russia) Andrey Parfenov	(Russia) Nikolay Morilov	(Russia) Pavel Siulatov	
IV	14	23 February 2019	(Russia) Syktyvkar	15 km C	(Russia) Ilia Semikov	(Russia) Ilia Poroshkin	(Russia) Sergey Ardashev	
IV	15	24 February 2019	(Russia) Syktyvkar	Sprint F	(Russia) Andrey Parfenov	(Russia) Kiril Vichuzhanin	(Russia) Andrey Krasnov	
IV	16	27 February 2019	(Russia) Syktyvkar	30 km Skiathlon	(Russia) Alexey Vitsenko	(Russia) Ilia Semikov	(Russia) Ermil Vokuev	

=== Women ===
Key: C – Classic / F – Freestyle
Period	Race	Date	Place	Discipline	Winner	Second	Third	Ref.
I	1	22 November 2018	(Russia) Vershina Tyoi	Sprint C	(Russia) Olga Tsareva	(Russia) Aida Bayazitova	(Russia) Olga Kucheruk	
I	2	23 November 2018	(Russia) Vershina Tyoi	5 km F	(Russia) Anna Nechaevskaya	(Russia) Yekaterina Smirnova	(Russia) Maya Yakunina	
I	3	25 November 2018	(Russia) Vershina Tyoi	Sprint F	(Russia) Olga Tsareva	(Russia) Anna Grukhvina	(Russia) Anastasia Vlasova	
I	4	26 November 2018	(Russia) Vershina Tyoi	10 km C	(Russia) Diana Golovan	(Russia) Mariya Guschina	(Russia) Polina Kalsina	
II	5	22 December 2018	(Russia) Krasnogorsk	Sprint C	(Russia) Natalya Matveyeva	(Russia) Tatyana Aleshina	(Russia) Polina Nekrasova	
II	6	23 December 2018	(Russia) Krasnogorsk	10 km F	(Russia) Tatyana Aleshina	(Russia) Olga Hlopotina	(Russia) Olga Tsareva	
II	7	25 December 2018	(Russia) Krasnogorsk	Sprint F	(Russia) Natalya Matveyeva	(Russia) Olga Tsareva	(Russia) Evgenia Oschepkova	
II	8	26 December 2018	(Russia) Krasnogorsk	15 km C	(Russia) Alisa Zhambalova	(Russia) Olga Tsareva	(Russia) Yana Kirpichenko	
III	9	10 January 2019	(Belarus) Raubichi	Sprint C	(Belarus) Anastasia Kirillova	(Russia) Olga Tsareva	(Russia) Anastasia Moskalenko	
III	10	11 January 2019	(Belarus) Raubichi	5 km C	(Russia) Alisa Zhambalova	(Russia) Olga Tsareva	(Belarus) Polina Seronosova	
III	11	13 January 2019	(Belarus) Raubichi	10 km F	(Russia) Alisa Zhambalova	(Russia) Olga Tsareva	(Russia) Alena Perevozchikova	
IV	12	8 February 2019	(Russia) Krasnogorsk	10 km C	(Russia) Alisa Zhambalova	(Russia) Diana Golovan	(Russia) Anastasia Vlasova	
IV	13	10 February 2019	(Russia) Krasnogorsk	Sprint F	(Russia) Anastasia Vlasova	(Russia) Maria Davydenkova	(Russia) Olga Tsareva	
IV	14	23 February 2019	(Russia) Syktyvkar	10 km C	(Russia) Yevgeniya Shapovalova	(Russia) Larisa Ryasina	(Russia) Lilia Vasilieva	
IV	15	24 February 2019	(Russia) Syktyvkar	Sprint F	(Russia) Aida Bayazitova	(Russia) Hristina Matsokina	(Russia) Evgenia Oschepkova	
IV	16	27 February 2019	(Russia) Syktyvkar	15 km Skiathlon	(Russia) Svetlana Plotnikova	(Russia) Gabriella Kaluger	(Russia) Svetlana Kuznetsova	

== Overall standings ==
=== Men's overall standings ===
Rank		Points
1	(Russia) Ilia Poroshkin	744
2	(Russia) Ermil Vokuev	702
3	(Russia) Ilia Semikov	630
4	(Russia) Artem Nikolayev	498
5	(Russia) Andrey Parfenov	494
6	(Russia) Alexey Vitsenko	431
7	(Russia) Andrey Feller	423
8	(Russia) Sergey Ardashev	386
9	(Russia) Alexander Bessmertnykh	347
10	(Russia) Alexander Terentev	310

=== Women's overall standings ===
Rank		Points
1	(Russia) Olga Tsareva	942
2	(Russia) Alisa Zhambalova	549
3	(Russia) Diana Golovan	472
4	(Russia) Anastasia Vlasova	422
5	(Russia) Anastasia Moskalenko	344
6	(Russia) Aida Bayazitova	304
7	(Russia) Hristina Matsokina	234
8	(Russia) Polina Kalsina	233
	(Russia) Marina Chernousova	233
10	(Russia) Olga Kucheruk	232
