= 2021–22 FIS Cross-Country Continental Cup =

Discipline	Men	Women
Alpen Cup	(France) Théo Schely	(Germany) Lisa Lohmann
Australia/New Zealand Cup	(Australia) Phillip Bellingham	(Australia) Casey Wright
Balkan Cup	(Bulgaria) Daniel Peshkov	(Serbia) Anja Ilić
Eastern Europe Cup	(Russia) Ilia Poroshkin	(Russia) Ekaterina Smirnova
Far East Cup	(Japan) Takanori Ebina	(South Korea) Lee Chae-won
Slavic Cup	(Poland) Dominik Bury	(Poland) Karolina Kukuczka
Scandinavian Cup	(Norway) Mattis Stenshagen	(Norway) Marte Skånes
US SuperTour	(United States) Zak Ketterson	(United States) Alayna Sonnesyn
Nor-Am Cup	(Canada) Antoine Cyr	(Canada) Katherine Stewart-Jones

Competition

The 2021–22 FIS Cross-Country Continental Cup (COC) was a season of the FIS Cross-Country Continental Cup, a series of second-level cross-country skiing competitions arranged by the International Ski Federation (FIS).

The 2021–22 Continental Cup contained nine different series of geographically restricted competitions; five in Europe, two in North America and one each in Asia and Oceania.

On 1 March 2022, following the 2022 Russian invasion of Ukraine, FIS decided to exclude athletes from Russia and Belarus from FIS competitions, with an immediate effect.

== Winners ==
The overall winners from the 2021–22 season's Continental Cups are rewarded a right to start in the first period in the following 2022–23 World Cup season.

Cup	Abbr.	Men			Women		
Cup	Abbr.	Winner	Second	Third	Winner	Second	Third
Alpen Cup (or OPA Cup)	OPA	(France) Théo Schely	(Switzerland) Cyril Fähndrich	(France) Martin Collet	(Germany) Lisa Lohmann	(Switzerland) Nadja Kälin	(Germany) Katherine Sauerbrey
Balkan Cup	BC	(Bulgaria) Daniel Peshkov	(Romania) Florin Robert Dolhascu	(Romania) Paul Constantin Pepene	(Serbia) Anja Ilić	(Romania) Tímea Lőrincz	(Bulgaria) Kalina Nedyalkova
Eastern Europe Cup	EEC	(Russia) Ilia Poroshkin	(Russia) Alexey Vitsenko	(Russia) Andrey Kuznetsov	(Russia) Ekaterina Smirnova	(Russia) Alisa Zhambalova	(Russia) Daria Rogozina
Far East Cup	FEC	(Japan) Takanori Ebina	(South Korea) Kim Min-woo	(South Korea) Jeong Jong-won	(South Korea) Lee Chae-won	(Japan) Chika Kobayashi	(Japan) Miki Kodama
Slavic Cup	SC	(Poland) Dominik Bury	(Poland) Maciej Staręga	(Poland) Mateusz Haratyk	(Poland) Karolina Kukuczka	(Poland) Monika Skinder	(Poland) Izabela Marcisz
Scandinavian Cup	SCAN	(Norway) Mattis Stenshagen	(Norway) Magne Haga	(Norway) Ole Jørgen Bruvoll	(Norway) Marte Skånes	(Norway) Karoline Simpson-Larsen	(Norway) Hedda Østberg Amundsen
US Super Tour	UST	(United States) Zak Ketterson	(United States) Adam Martin	(United States) John Steel Hagenbuch	(United States) Alayna Sonnesyn	(United States) Katharine Odgen	(United States) Rosie Frankowski
Nor-Am Cup	NAC	(Canada) Antoine Cyr	(Canada) Russell Kennedy	(Canada) Rémi Drolet	(Canada) Katherine Stewart-Jones	(Canada) Cendrine Browne	(Canada) Olivia Bouffard-Nesbitt
Australia/New Zealand Cup	ANC	(Australia) Phillip Bellingham	(Australia) Seve De Campo	(Australia) Mark Pollock	(Australia) Casey Wright	(Australia) Zana Evans	(Australia) Aimee Watson

== Results ==
=== Men ===
==== Alpen Cup ====
Key: C – Classic / F – Freestyle
Stage	Date	Place	Discipline	Winner	Second	Third
1	3 December 2021	(Switzerland) Ulrichen	15 km C	(Germany) Albert Kuchler	(France) Martin Collet	(Italy) Martin Coradazzi
2	4 December 2021	(Switzerland) Ulrichen	Sprint F	(Italy) Francesco Manzoni	(Italy) Giovanni Ticco	(France) Sabin Coupat
3	5 December 2021	(Switzerland) Ulrichen	15 km F Mass Start	(France) Tom Mancini	(France) Sabin Coupat	(France) Gérard Agnellet
4	18 December 2021	(Austria) Sankt Ulrich am Pillersee	15 km C	(Russia) Evgeniy Belov	(Switzerland) Dario Cologna	(Germany) Albert Kuchler
5	19 December 2021	(Austria) Sankt Ulrich am Pillersee	15 km F Mass Start	(Switzerland) Cyril Fähndrich	(France) Tom Mancini	(France) Martin Collet (Switzerland) Beda Klee
	7 January 2022	(Czech Republic) Nové Město na Moravě	Sprint C	cancelled, moved to Sankt Ulrich am Pillersee		
	8 January 2022	(Czech Republic) Nové Město na Moravě	15 km C	cancelled, moved to Sankt Ulrich am Pillersee		
	9 January 2022	(Czech Republic) Nové Město na Moravě	15 km F	cancelled, moved to Sankt Ulrich am Pillersee		
6	8 January 2022	(Austria) Sankt Ulrich am Pillersee	Sprint F	(Switzerland) Valerio Grond	(Switzerland) Janik Riebli	(France) Arnaud Chautemps
7	9 January 2022	(Austria) Sankt Ulrich am Pillersee	15 km C	(Switzerland) Jason Rüesch	(France) Théo Schely	(Switzerland) Ueli Schnider
8	22 January 2022	(Germany) Oberstdorf	Sprint C	(France) Jules Chappaz	(Switzerland) Valerio Grond	(Italy) Mikael Abram
9	23 January 2022	(Germany) Oberstdorf	30 km F Mass Start	(Switzerland) Jason Rüesch	(France) Arnaud Chautemps	(Switzerland) Beda Klee
10	4 February 2022	(Slovenia) Planica	15 km C	(France) Jules Chappaz	(France) Théo Schely	(Italy) Simone Daprà
11	5 February 2022	(Slovenia) Planica	Sprint F	(France) Jules Chappaz	(Switzerland) Cédric Steiner	(Switzerland) Cyril Fähndrich
12	6 February 2022	(Slovenia) Planica	15 km F Mass Start	(France) Martin Collet	(France) Gaspard Rousset	(France) Théo Schely
13	12 March 2022	(Italy) Sappada	15 km C	(Italy) Dietmar Nöckler	(France) Gaspard Rousset	(Italy) Martin Coradazzi
14	13 March 2022	(Italy) Sappada	15 km F Mass Start	(Switzerland) Cyril Fähndrich	(Italy) Simone Daprà	(France) Sabin Coupat

==== Australia/New Zealand Cup ====
Key: C – Classic / F – Freestyle
Stage	Date	Place	Discipline	Winner	Second	Third
1	7 August 2021	(Australia) Perisher	Sprint F	(Australia) Phillip Bellingham	(Australia) Seve De Campo	(Australia) Fedele De Campo
2	8 August 2021	(Australia) Perisher	15 km C	(Australia) Phillip Bellingham	(Australia) Seve De Campo	(Australia) Mark Pollock
	4 September 2021	(Australia) Falls Creek	Sprint C	cancelled		
	5 September 2021	(Australia) Falls Creek	10 km F	cancelled		

==== Balkan Cup ====
Key: C – Classic / F – Freestyle
Stage	Date	Place	Discipline	Winner	Second	Third
1	12 January 2022	(Serbia) Sjenica	10 km C	(Bulgaria) Daniel Peshkov	(Spain) Bernat Selles Gasch	(Bosnia and Herzegovina) Strahinja Erić
2	13 January 2022	(Serbia) Sjenica	10 km C	(Spain) Bernat Selles Gasch	(Bulgaria) Daniel Peshkov	(Bulgaria) Mario Matikanov
3	29 January 2022	(Greece) Pigadia	10 km F	(Romania) Florin Robert Dolhascu	(Bulgaria) Daniel Peshkov	(Romania) Gabriel Cojocaru
4	30 January 2022	(Greece) Pigadia	10 km F	(Romania) Florin Robert Dolhascu	(Bulgaria) Daniel Peshkov	(Bulgaria) Todor Malchov
5	26 February 2022	(Croatia) Ravna Gora	10 km C	(Croatia) Marko Skender	(Hungary) Kristof Lagler	(Croatia) Petar Perusic
6	27 February 2022	(Croatia) Ravna Gora	10 km C Mass Start	(Bosnia and Herzegovina) Strahinja Erić	(Croatia) Marko Skender	(Croatia) Petar Perusic
7	5 March 2022	(Bosnia and Herzegovina) Dvorišta-Pale	10 km F	(Romania) Paul Constantin Pepene	(Romania) Florin Robert Dolhascu	(Romania) Raul Mihai Popa
8	6 March 2022	(Bosnia and Herzegovina) Dvorišta-Pale	10 km F	(Romania) Paul Constantin Pepene	(Romania) Raul Mihai Popa	(Romania) Florin Robert Dolhascu
9	12 March 2022	(Romania) Fundata	10 km F	(Romania) Paul Constantin Pepene	(Romania) Raul Mihai Popa	(Romania) Florin Robert Dolhascu
10	13 March 2022	(Romania) Fundata	10 km C	(Romania) Paul Constantin Pepene	(Romania) Raul Mihai Popa	(Romania) Florin Robert Dolhascu
11	26 March 2022	(Turkey) Bolu-Gerede	10 km C	(Romania) Paul Constantin Pepene	(Romania) Florin Robert Dolhascu	(Bulgaria) Daniel Peshkov
12	27 March 2022	(Turkey) Bolu-Gerede	10 km F	(Romania) Florin Robert Dolhascu	(Romania) Paul Constantin Pepene	(Romania) Raul Mihai Popa
	28 March 2022	(Turkey) Bolu-Gerede	Sprint F	cancelled		

==== Eastern Europe Cup ====
Key: C – Classic / F – Freestyle
Stage	Date	Place	Discipline	Winner	Second	Third
1	13 November 2021	(Kazakhstan) Shchuchinsk	Sprint C	(Russia) Andrey Kuznetsov	(Russia) Andrey Parfenov	(Russia) Andrey Krasnov
2	14 November 2021	(Kazakhstan) Shchuchinsk	10 km C Individual	(Russia) Andrey Kuznetsov	(Russia) Sergey Volkov	(Russia) Andrey Krasnov
3	15 November 2021	(Kazakhstan) Shchuchinsk	15 km F Individual	(Russia) Sergey Volkov	(Russia) Andrey Krasnov	(Russia) Andrey Kuznetsov
4	27 November 2021	(Russia) Vershina Tea	Sprint C	(Russia) Andrey Kuznetsov	(Russia) Vladislav Vechkanov	(Russia) Alexey Vitsenko
5	28 November 2021	(Russia) Vershina Tea	15 km F	(Russia) Ilia Poroshkin	(Russia) Alexander Ivshin	(Russia) Kirill Kilivnyuk
6	30 November 2021	(Russia) Vershina Tea	Sprint F	(Russia) Fedor Nazarov	(Russia) Ivan Bezmaternykh	(Russia) Ilia Poroshkin
7	1 December 2021	(Russia) Vershina Tea	15 km C	(Russia) Ilia Poroshkin	(Russia) Vladimir Frolov	(Russia) Alexander Ivshin
8	18 December 2021	(Russia) Kirovo-Chepetsk	Sprint F	(Russia) Sergey Ardashev	(Russia) Sergey Volkov	(Russia) Andrey Parfenov
9	19 December 2021	(Russia) Kirovo-Chepetsk	15 km F	(Russia) Andrey Larkov	(Russia) Ilia Poroshkin	(Russia) Artem Nikolaev (Russia) Sergey Volkov
10	21 December 2021	(Russia) Kirovo-Chepetsk	30 km C	(Russia) Andrey Larkov	(Russia) Ilia Poroshkin	(Russia) Alexey Vitsenko
11	4 January 2022	(Belarus) Minsk-Raubichi	Sprint F	(Russia) Sergey Ardashev	(Russia) Fedor Nazarov	(Russia) Andrey Larkov
12	5 January 2022	(Belarus) Minsk-Raubichi	10 km C	(Russia) Ilia Poroshkin	(Russia) Andrey Larkov	(Russia) Sergey Ardashev
13	7 January 2022	(Belarus) Minsk-Raubichi	30 km F Mass Start	(Russia) Andrey Larkov	(Russia) Artem Nikolaev	(Russia) Vladislav Vechkanov
14	11 February 2022	(Russia) Krasnogorsk	15 km F	(Russia) Ilia Poroshkin	(Russia) Alexey Vitsenko	(Russia) Andrey Kuznetsov
15	13 February 2022	(Russia) Krasnogorsk	Sprint C	(Russia) Alexey Vitsenko	(Russia) Andrey Parfenov	(Russia) Andrey Kuznetsov
16	23 February 2022	(Russia) Tyumen	15 km F	(Russia) Alexey Vitsenko	(Russia) Anton Timashov	(Russia) Alexey Shemiakin
17	24 February 2022	(Russia) Tyumen	Sprint C	(Russia) Andrey Parfenov	(Russia) Ermil Vokuev	(Russia) Anton Timashov
18	27 February 2022	(Russia) Tyumen	Skiathlon 15 km C/F	(Russia) Anton Timashov	(Russia) Alexey Shemiakin	(Russia) Alexander Grebenko

==== Far East Cup ====
Key: C – Classic / F – Freestyle
Stage	Date	Place	Discipline	Winner	Second	Third
	26 December 2021	(Japan) Otoineppu	10 km C	cancelled, moved to Pyeongchang on the same dates		
	27 December 2021	(Japan) Otoineppu	10 km F	cancelled, moved to Pyeongchang on the same dates		
1	26 December 2021	(South Korea) Pyeongchang	10 km C	(South Korea) Kim Min-woo	(South Korea) Jeong Jong-won	(South Korea) Byun Ji-Yeong
2	27 December 2021	(South Korea) Pyeongchang	10 km F	(South Korea) Kim Eun-ho	(South Korea) Jeong Jong-won	(South Korea) Kim Min-woo
3	8 January 2022	(Japan) Sapporo	10 km F	(Japan) Haruki Yamashita	(Japan) Takatsugu Uda	(Japan) Hiroyuki Miyazawa
4	9 January 2022	(Japan) Sapporo	10 km C	(Japan) Ryo Hirose	(Japan) Takanori Ebina	(Japan) Takatsugu Uda
5	10 January 2022	(Japan) Sapporo	Sprint C	(Japan) Takanori Ebina	(Japan) Hiroyuki Miyazawa	(Japan) Ryo Hirose
6	18 January 2022	(South Korea) Pyeongchang	10 km C	(South Korea) Byun Ji-Yeong	(South Korea) Kim Min-woo	(South Korea) Lee Joon-Seo
7	19 January 2022	(South Korea) Pyeongchang	10 km F	(South Korea) Jeong Jong-won	(South Korea) Kim Min-woo	(South Korea) Park Seongbeom
	12 February 2022	(Japan) Shiramine	10 km F	cancelled		
	13 February 2022	(Japan) Shiramine	Sprint C	cancelled		
8	4 March 2022	(Japan) Sapporo	10 km C	(Japan) Takanori Ebina	(Japan) Hyuga Otaki	(Japan) Masato Tanaka
9	5 March 2022	(Japan) Sapporo	15 km F	(Japan) Masato Tanaka	(Japan) Kaichi Naruse	(Japan) Takanori Ebina

==== Scandinavian Cup ====
Key: C – Classic / F – Freestyle
Stage	Date	Place	Discipline	Winner	Second	Third
1	10 December 2021	(Norway) Beitostølen	Sprint C	(Norway) Didrik Tønseth	(Norway) Ole Jørgen Bruvoll	(Norway) Vebjørn Turtveit
2	11 December 2021	(Norway) Beitostølen	15 km C	(Norway) Aron Åkre Rysstad	(Norway) Lars Agnar Hjelmeset	(Norway) Håkon Skaanes
3	12 December 2021	(Norway) Beitostølen	15 km F	(Norway) Didrik Tønseth	(Norway) Martin Kirkeberg Mørk	(Norway) Vebjørn Turtveit
4	7 January 2021	(Sweden) Falun	Sprint F	(Sweden) Karl-Johan Westberg	(Norway) Håvard Solås Taugbøl	(Norway) Finn Hågen Krogh
5	8 January 2021	(Sweden) Falun	15 km C	(Sweden) William Poromaa	(Norway) Mikael Gunnulfsen	(Sweden) Johan Häggström
6	9 January 2021	(Sweden) Falun	15 km F	(Sweden) William Poromaa	(Norway) Andreas Fjorden Ree	(Norway) Magne Haga
7	11 February 2021	(Estonia) Otepää	Sprint F	(Norway) Even Northug	(Norway) Sindre Bjørnestad Skar	(Norway) Pål Trøan Aune
8	12 February 2021	(Estonia) Otepää	30 km C	(Norway) Mattis Stenshagen	(Norway) Eirik Mysen	(Norway) Harald Østberg Amundsen
9	13 February 2021	(Estonia) Otepää	15 km C	(Norway) Harald Østberg Amundsen	(Sweden) Jonas Eriksson	(Norway) Erland Kvisle
	18 March 2021	(Iceland) Akureyri	15 km F	cancelled		
10	19 March 2021	(Iceland) Akureyri	Sprint F	(Norway) Simen Myhre	(Norway) Gjøran Tefre	(Norway) Pål Trøan Aune
11	20 March 2021	(Iceland) Akureyri	15 km F Mass Start	(Norway) Jan Thomas Jenssen	(Norway) Magne Haga	(Norway) Iver Tildheim Andersen

==== Slavic Cup ====
Key: C – Classic / F – Freestyle
Stage	Date	Place	Discipline	Winner	Second	Third
	18 December 2021	(Slovakia) Štrbské Pleso	Sprint F	cancelled		
	19 December 2021	(Slovakia) Štrbské Pleso	10 km C	cancelled		
1	11 January 2022	(Poland) Zakopane	10 km F	(Poland) Dominik Bury	(Poland) Maciej Staręga	(Poland) Mateusz Haratyk
2	12 January 2022	(Poland) Zakopane	15 km C Mass Start	(Poland) Dominik Bury	(Poland) Mateusz Haratyk	(Slovakia) Peter Mlynár
	5 March 2022	(Slovakia) Kremnica-Skalka	15 km F Mass Start	cancelled		
3	12 March 2022	(Slovakia) Štrbské Pleso	15 km C	(Czech Republic) Adam Fellner	(Slovakia) Peter Mlynár	(Czech Republic) Vladimir Kolzovskiy
4	13 March 2022	(Slovakia) Štrbské Pleso	15 km F	(Czech Republic) Adam Fellner	(Czech Republic) Vladimir Kolzovskiy	(Slovakia) Peter Mlynár
	13 March 2022	(Slovakia) Štrbské Pleso	Sprint F	cancelled; replaced with 15 km freestyle event on the same day		
	26 March 2022	(Poland) Wisła-Kubalonka	Sprint F	cancelled, moved to Zakopane on the same dates		
	27 March 2022	(Poland) Wisła-Kubalonka	15 km C Mass Start	cancelled, moved to Zakopane on the same dates		
5	26 March 2022	(Poland) Zakopane	10 km C	(Poland) Dominik Bury	(Poland) Kamil Bury	(Poland) Michał Skowron
6	27 March 2022	(Poland) Zakopane	12,5 km F Mass Start	(Poland) Dominik Bury	(Poland) Maciej Staręga	(Poland) Kacper Antolec

==== US Super Tour ====
Key: C – Classic / F – Freestyle
Stage	Date	Place	Discipline	Winner	Second	Third
1	4 December 2021	(United States) Duluth	Sprint F	(United States) Tyler Cornfield	(United States) Noel Keeffe	(United States) Adam Witkowski
2	5 December 2021	(United States) Duluth	10 km F	(United States) Zak Ketterson	(Norway) Kjetil Stuge Bånerud	(United States) Adam Martin
3	10 December 2021	(United States) Cable	15 km F Mass Start	(Canada) Philippe Boucher	(United States) Adam Martin	(United States) Zak Ketterson
4	11 December 2021	(United States) Cable	Sprint C	(United States) Zak Ketterson	(Canada) Antoine Briand	(United States) Bill Harmeyer
5	12 December 2021	(United States) Cable	15 km C	(United States) Adam Martin	(United States) Zak Ketterson	(Canada) Philippe Boucher
6	7 January 2022	(United States) Soldier Hollow	Sprint C	(Norway) Magnus Bøe	(United States) Karl Schulz	(United States) James Clinton Schoonmaker
7	15 January 2022	(United States) Lake Creek	10 km F	(United States) John Steel Hagenbuch	(United States) Hunter Wonders	(Austria) Bernhard Flaschberger
8	16 January 2022	(United States) Lake Creek	15 km C Mass Start	(United States) David Norris	(United States) Hunter Wonders	(United States) Scott Patterson
9	29 January 2022	(United States) Mount Van Hoevenberg	Sprint C	(United States) Zak Ketterson	(United States) Peter Holmes	(United States) Bill Harmeyer
10	30 January 2022	(United States) Mount Van Hoevenberg	10 km F	(United States) John Steel Hagenbuch	(United States) Adam Martin	(United States) Peter Wolter
11	4 February 2022	(United States) Craftsbury	Sprint F	(United States) Zak Ketterson	(Norway) Matias Øvrum	(Canada) Étienne Hébert
12	5 February 2022	(United States) Craftsbury	10 km C	(United States) Adam Martin	(United States) Zak Ketterson	(United States) John Steel Hagenbuch
13	6 February 2022	(United States) Craftsbury	7.5 km F	(United States) John Steel Hagenbuch	(United States) Adam Martin	(United States) Zak Ketterson

==== Nor-Am Cup ====
Key: C – Classic / F – Freestyle
Stage	Date	Place	Discipline	Winner	Second	Third
1	6 January 2022	(Canada) Canmore	Sprint F	(Canada) Antoine Cyr	(Canada) Russell Kennedy	(Canada) Pierre Grall-Johnson
2	8 January 2022	(Canada) Canmore	15 km C	(Canada) Antoine Cyr	(Canada) Rémi Drolet	(Canada) Russell Kennedy
3	9 January 2022	(Canada) Canmore	30 km F Mass Start	(Canada) Russell Kennedy	(Canada) Philippe Boucher	(Canada) Tom Stephen
3	11 January 2022	(Canada) Canmore	Sprint C	(Canada) Xavier McKeever	(Canada) Antoine Cyr	(Canada) Rémi Drolet

=== Women ===
==== Alpen Cup ====
Key: C – Classic / F – Freestyle
Stage	Date	Place	Discipline	Winner	Second	Third
1	3 December 2021	(Switzerland) Ulrichen	10 km C	(Germany) Katherine Sauerbrey	(France) Coralie Bentz	(Germany) Lisa Lohmann
2	4 December 2021	(Switzerland) Ulrichen	Sprint F	(Austria) Lisa Unterweger	(Germany) Lisa Lohmann	(Austria) Barbara Walchhofer
3	5 December 2021	(Switzerland) Ulrichen	10 km F Mass Start	(Germany) Katherine Sauerbrey	(France) Coralie Bentz	(Italy) Cristina Pittin
4	18 December 2021	(Austria) Sankt Ulrich am Pillersee	10 km C	(Germany) Katherine Sauerbrey	(Germany) Lisa Lohmann	(Switzerland) Nadja Kälin
5	19 December 2021	(Austria) Sankt Ulrich am Pillersee	10 km F Mass Start	(Germany) Katherine Sauerbrey	(Switzerland) Nadja Kälin	(Switzerland) Lydia Hiernickel
	7 January 2022	(Czech Republic) Nové Město na Moravě	Sprint C	cancelled, moved to Sankt Ulrich am Pillersee		
	8 January 2022	(Czech Republic) Nové Město na Moravě	10 km C	cancelled, moved to Sankt Ulrich am Pillersee		
	9 January 2022	(Czech Republic) Nové Město na Moravě	10 km F	cancelled, moved to Sankt Ulrich am Pillersee		
6	8 January 2022	(Austria) Sankt Ulrich am Pillersee	Sprint F	(Switzerland) Alina Meier	(Austria) Lisa Unterweger	(Switzerland) Anja Weber
7	9 January 2022	(Austria) Sankt Ulrich am Pillersee	10 km C	(Switzerland) Nadja Kälin	(Austria) Lisa Unterweger	(Germany) Amelie Hofmann
8	22 January 2022	(Germany) Oberstdorf	Sprint C	(Germany) Laura Gimmler	(Germany) Sofie Krehl	(Germany) Coletta Rydzek
9	23 January 2022	(Germany) Oberstdorf	20 km F Mass Start	(Germany) Lisa Lohmann	(Switzerland) Nadja Kälin	(Germany) Kim Hager
10	4 February 2022	(Slovenia) Planica	10 km C	(Germany) Lisa Lohmann	(Switzerland) Désirée Steiner	(Italy) Nicole Monsorno
11	5 February 2022	(Slovenia) Planica	Sprint F	(Switzerland) Lea Fischer	(Germany) Lisa Lohmann	(Czech Republic) Adéla Nováková
12	6 February 2022	(Slovenia) Planica	10 km F Mass Start	(Switzerland) Lea Fischer	(Germany) Lisa Lohmann	(Germany) Linda Schumacher
13	12 March 2022	(Italy) Sappada	10 km C	(Switzerland) Anja Weber	(Italy) Martina Bellini	(United States) Alayna Sonnesyn
14	13 March 2022	(Italy) Sappada	10 km F Mass Start	(United States) Alayna Sonnesyn	(Switzerland) Anja Weber	(Italy) Cristina Pittin

==== Australia/New Zealand Cup ====
Key: C – Classic / F – Freestyle
Stage	Date	Place	Discipline	Winner	Second	Third
1	7 August 2021	(Australia) Perisher	Sprint F	(Australia) Casey Wright	(Australia) Zana Evans	(Australia) Aimee Watson
2	8 August 2021	(Australia) Perisher	10 km C	(Australia) Casey Wright	(Australia) Zana Evans	(Australia) Aimee Watson
	4 September 2021	(Australia) Falls Creek	Sprint C	cancelled		
	5 September 2021	(Australia) Falls Creek	5 km F	cancelled		

==== Balkan Cup ====
Key: C – Classic / F – Freestyle
Stage	Date	Place	Discipline	Winner	Second	Third
1	12 January 2022	(Serbia) Sjenica	5 km C	(Spain) Marta Moreno Ramos	(Brazil) Jaqueline Mourão	(Latvia) Estere Volfa
2	13 January 2022	(Serbia) Sjenica	5 km C	(Spain) Marta Moreno Ramos	(Brazil) Jaqueline Mourão	(Latvia) Samanta Krampe
3	29 January 2022	(Greece) Pigadia	5 km F	(Serbia) Anja Ilić	(Bulgaria) Kalina Nedyalkova	(Romania) Delia Ioana Reit
4	30 January 2022	(Greece) Pigadia	5 km F	(Serbia) Anja Ilić	(Bulgaria) Kalina Nedyalkova	(Romania) Delia Ioana Reit
5	26 February 2022	(Croatia) Ravna Gora	5 km C	(Croatia) Vedrana Malec	(Croatia) Tena Hadžić	(Serbia) Anja Ilić
6	27 February 2022	(Croatia) Ravna Gora	5 km C Mass Start	(Croatia) Vedrana Malec	(Croatia) Tena Hadžić	(Serbia) Anja Ilić
7	5 March 2022	(Bosnia and Herzegovina) Dvorišta-Pale	5 km F	(Romania) Tímea Lőrincz	(Serbia) Anja Ilić	(Romania) Delia Ioana Reit
8	6 March 2022	(Bosnia and Herzegovina) Dvorišta-Pale	5 km F	(Romania) Tímea Lőrincz	(Serbia) Anja Ilić	(Romania) Delia Ioana Reit
9	12 March 2022	(Romania) Fundata	5 km F	(Romania) Tímea Lőrincz	(Serbia) Anja Ilić	(North Macedonia) Ana Cvetanovska
10	13 March 2022	(Romania) Fundata	5 km C	(Romania) Tímea Lőrincz	(Serbia) Anja Ilić	(Romania) Delia Ioana Reit
11	26 March 2022	(Turkey) Bolu-Gerede	5 km C	(Estonia) Kaidy Kaasiku	(Estonia) Keidy Kaasiku	(Romania) Tímea Lőrincz
12	27 March 2022	(Turkey) Bolu-Gerede	10 km F	(Estonia) Keidy Kaasiku	(Estonia) Kaidy Kaasiku	(Croatia) Vedrana Malec
	28 March 2022	(Turkey) Bolu-Gerede	Sprint F	cancelled		

==== Eastern Europe Cup ====
Key: C – Classic / F – Freestyle
Stage	Date	Place	Discipline	Winner	Second	Third
1	13 November 2021	(Kazakhstan) Shchuchinsk	Sprint C	(Russia) Nataliya Mekryukova	(Russia) Daria Rogozina	(Russia) Ekaterina Smirnova
2	14 November 2021	(Kazakhstan) Shchuchinsk	5 km C Individual	(Russia) Nataliya Mekryukova	(Russia) Ekaterina Smirnova	(Kazakhstan) Kseniya Shalygina
3	15 November 2021	(Kazakhstan) Shchuchinsk	10 km F Individual	(Russia) Ekaterina Smirnova	(Kazakhstan) Kseniya Shalygina	(Russia) Nataliya Mekryukova
4	27 November 2021	(Russia) Vershina Tea	Sprint C	(Russia) Alesya Rushentseva	(Russia) Natalia Matveeva	(Russia) Evgenia Rudometova
5	28 November 2021	(Russia) Vershina Tea	10 km F	(Russia) Evgeniya Krupitskaya	(Russia) Olga Zholudeva	(Russia) Elizaveta Shalaboda
6	30 November 2021	(Russia) Vershina Tea	Sprint F	(Russia) Ekaterina Smirnova	(Russia) Elizaveta Bekisheva	(Russia) Elizaveta Shalaboda
7	1 December 2021	(Russia) Vershina Tea	10 km C	(Russia) Dariya Nepryaeva	(Russia) Alisa Zhambalova	(Russia) Mariya Guschina
8	18 December 2021	(Russia) Kirovo-Chepetsk	Sprint F	(Russia) Olga Kucheruk	(Russia) Natalia Matveeva	(Russia) Maria Davydenkova
9	19 December 2021	(Russia) Kirovo-Chepetsk	10 km F	(Russia) Ekaterina Smirnova	(Russia) Olga Kucheruk	(Russia) Alisa Zhambalova
10	21 December 2021	(Russia) Kirovo-Chepetsk	15 km C	(Russia) Ekaterina Smirnova	(Russia) Alisa Zhambalova	(Russia) Mariya Guschina
11	4 January 2022	(Belarus) Minsk-Raubichi	Sprint F	(Belarus) Anastasia Kirillova	(Russia) Alisa Zhambalova	(Belarus) Hanna Karaliova
12	5 January 2022	(Belarus) Minsk-Raubichi	5 km C	(Belarus) Anastasia Kirillova	(Russia) Alisa Zhambalova	(Russia) Daria Rogozina
13	7 January 2022	(Belarus) Minsk-Raubichi	15 km F Mass Start	(Belarus) Hanna Karaliova	(Russia) Alisa Zhambalova	(Russia) Daria Rogozina
14	11 February 2022	(Russia) Krasnogorsk	10 km F	(Russia) Ekaterina Smirnova	(Russia) Alisa Zhambalova	(Russia) Anastasia Dotsenko
15	13 February 2022	(Russia) Krasnogorsk	Sprint C	(Russia) Diana Soboleva	(Russia) Anastasia Dotsenko	(Russia) Maria Davydenkova
16	23 February 2022	(Russia) Tyumen	10 km F	(Russia) Ekaterina Smirnova	(Russia) Alija Iksanova	(Russia) Alisa Zhambalova
17	24 February 2022	(Russia) Tyumen	Sprint C	(Russia) Anastasia Dotsenko	(Russia) Diana Soboleva	(Russia) Alisa Zhambalova
18	27 February 2022	(Russia) Tyumen	Skiathlon 7.5 km C/F	(Russia) Alisa Zhambalova	(Russia) Svetlana Zaborskaia	(Russia) Alija Iksanova

==== Far East Cup ====
Key: C – Classic / F – Freestyle
Stage	Date	Place	Discipline	Winner	Second	Third
	26 December 2021	(Japan) Otoineppu	5 km C	cancelled, moved to Pyeongchang on the same dates		
	27 December 2021	(Japan) Otoineppu	5 km F	cancelled, moved to Pyeongchang on the same dates		
1	26 December 2021	(South Korea) Pyeongchang	5 km C	(South Korea) Lee Eui-jin	(South Korea) Lee Chae-won	(South Korea) Han Da-som
2	27 December 2021	(South Korea) Pyeongchang	5 km F	(South Korea) Lee Chae-won	(South Korea) Lee Eui-jin	(South Korea) Han Da-som
3	8 January 2022	(Japan) Sapporo	5 km F	(Japan) Masao Tsuchiya	(Japan) Chika Kobayashi	(Japan) Miki Kodama
4	9 January 2022	(Japan) Sapporo	5 km C	(Japan) Masao Tsuchiya	(Japan) Miki Kodama	(Japan) Chika Kobayashi
5	10 January 2022	(Japan) Sapporo	Sprint C	(Japan) Miki Kodama	(Japan) Rin Sobue	(Japan) Chika Kobayashi
6	18 January 2022	(South Korea) Pyeongchang	5 km C	(South Korea) Lee Eui-jin	(South Korea) Han Da-som	(South Korea) Lee Chae-won
7	19 January 2022	(South Korea) Pyeongchang	5 km F	(South Korea) Lee Chae-won	(South Korea) Lee Eui-jin	(South Korea) Han Da-som
	12 February 2022	(Japan) Shiramine	5 km F	cancelled		
	13 February 2022	(Japan) Shiramine	Sprint C	cancelled		
8	4 March 2022	(Japan) Sapporo	5 km C	(Japan) Moeko Kobayashi	(Japan) Yuka Watanabe	(Japan) Chika Kobayashi
9	5 March 2022	(Japan) Sapporo	10 km F	(Japan) Chika Kobayashi	(Japan) Moeko Kobayashi	(Japan) Miki Kodama

==== Scandinavian Cup ====
Key: C – Classic / F – Freestyle
Stage	Date	Place	Discipline	Winner	Second	Third
1	10 December 2021	(Norway) Beitostølen	10 km C	(Norway) Silje Theodorsen	(Norway) Marte Skånes	(Norway) Berit Mogstad
2	11 December 2021	(Norway) Beitostølen	Sprint C	(Norway) Anna Svendsen	(Norway) Julie Myhre	(Norway) Hedda Østberg Amundsen
3	12 December 2021	(Norway) Beitostølen	10 km F	(Norway) Silje Theodorsen	(Norway) Karoline Simpson-Larsen	(Norway) Maren Wangensteen
4	7 January 2021	(Sweden) Falun	Sprint F	(Sweden) Jonna Sundling	(Sweden) Maja Dahlqvist	(Sweden) Moa Olsson
5	8 January 2021	(Sweden) Falun	10 km C	(Sweden) Jonna Sundling	(Norway) Marte Skånes	(Sweden) Moa Olsson
6	9 January 2021	(Sweden) Falun	10 km F	(Sweden) Jonna Sundling	(Norway) Maren Wangensteen	(Norway) Karoline Simpson-Larsen
7	11 February 2021	(Estonia) Otepää	Sprint F	(Sweden) Moa Lundgren	(Sweden) Johanna Hagström	(Norway) Magni Smedås
8	12 February 2021	(Estonia) Otepää	20 km C	(Norway) Marte Skånes	(Sweden) Moa Lundgren	(Norway) Silje Theodorsen
9	13 February 2021	(Estonia) Otepää	10 km C	(Norway) Hedda Østberg Amundsen	(Norway) Marte Skånes	(Norway) Silje Theodorsen
	18 March 2021	(Iceland) Akureyri	10 km F	cancelled		
10	19 March 2021	(Iceland) Akureyri	Sprint F	(Norway) Amalie Håkonsen Ous	(Finland) Jasmin Kahara	(Norway) Magni Smedås
11	20 March 2021	(Iceland) Akureyri	15 km F Mass Start	(Norway) Marte Skånes	(Norway) Karoline Simpson-Larsen	(Norway) Magni Smedås

==== Slavic Cup ====
Key: C – Classic / F – Freestyle
Stage	Date	Place	Discipline	Winner	Second	Third
	18 December 2021	(Slovakia) Štrbské Pleso	Sprint F	cancelled		
	19 December 2021	(Slovakia) Štrbské Pleso	5 km C	cancelled		
1	11 January 2022	(Poland) Zakopane	5 km F	(Poland) Monika Skinder	(Poland) Izabela Marcisz	(Poland) Magdalena Kobielusz
2	12 January 2022	(Poland) Zakopane	10 km C Mass Start	(Poland) Izabela Marcisz	(Poland) Monika Skinder	(Poland) Magdalena Kobielusz
	5 March 2022	(Slovakia) Kremnica-Skalka	10 km F Mass Start	cancelled		
3	12 March 2022	(Slovakia) Štrbské Pleso	10 km C	(Poland) Karolina Kukuczka	(Czech Republic) Katerina Svobodova	(Czech Republic) Anna Strouhalova
4	13 March 2022	(Slovakia) Štrbské Pleso	10 km F	(Poland) Karolina Kukuczka	(Slovakia) Maria Remenova	(Czech Republic) Katerina Svobodova
	13 March 2022	(Slovakia) Štrbské Pleso	Sprint F	cancelled; replaced with 10 km freestyle event on the same day		
	26 March 2022	(Poland) Wisła-Kubalonka	Sprint F	cancelled, moved to Zakopane on the same dates		
	27 March 2022	(Poland) Wisła-Kubalonka	10 km C Mass Start	cancelled, moved to Zakopane on the same dates		
5	26 March 2022	(Poland) Zakopane	5 km C	(Poland) Monika Skinder	(Poland) Karolina Kukuczka	(Poland) Weronika Jarecka
6	27 March 2022	(Poland) Zakopane	7,5 km F Mass Start	(Poland) Monika Skinder	(Poland) Karolina Kukuczka	(Poland) Andżelika Szyszka

==== US Super Tour ====
Key: C – Classic / F – Freestyle
Stage	Date	Place	Discipline	Winner	Second	Third
1	4 December 2021	(United States) Duluth	Sprint F	(United States) Becca Rorabaugh	(United States) Alayna Sonnesyn	(United States) Rosie Frankowski
2	5 December 2021	(United States) Duluth	5 km F	(United States) Rosie Frankowski	(United States) Alexandra Lawson	(United States) Alayna Sonnesyn
3	10 December 2021	(United States) Cable	15 km F Mass Start	(United States) Rosie Frankowski	(United States) Alayna Sonnesyn	(United States) Mariah Brendal
4	11 December 2021	(United States) Cable	Sprint C	(United States) Alayna Sonnesyn	(United States) Lauren Jortberg	(United States) Rosie Frankowski
5	12 December 2021	(United States) Cable	10 km C	(United States) Alayna Sonnesyn	(United States) Becca Rorabaugh	(United States) Rosie Frankowski
6	7 January 2022	(United States) Soldier Hollow	Sprint C	(United States) Katharine Odgen	(United States) Caitlin Patterson	(United States) Hannah Rudd
7	15 January 2022	(United States) Lake Creek	5 km F	(United States) Rosie Brennan	(United States) Sophia Laukli	(United States) Novie McCabe
8	16 January 2022	(United States) Lake Creek	10 km C Mass Start	(United States) Rosie Brennan	(United States) Katharine Odgen	(United States) Novie McCabe
9	29 January 2022	(United States) Mount Van Hoevenberg	Sprint C	(United States) Katharine Odgen	(United States) Becca Rorabaugh	(United States) Alayna Sonnesyn
10	30 January 2022	(United States) Mount Van Hoevenberg	10 km F	(United States) Alayna Sonnesyn	(United States) Rosie Frankowski	(United States) Becca Rorabaugh
11	4 February 2022	(United States) Craftsbury	Sprint F	(United States) Katharine Odgen	(United States) Lauren Jortberg	(United States) Ava Thurston
12	5 February 2022	(United States) Craftsbury	10 km C	(United States) Katharine Odgen	(United States) Alayna Sonnesyn	(United States) Rosie Frankowski
13	6 February 2022	(United States) Craftsbury	7.5 km F	(United States) Alayna Sonnesyn	(United States) Rosie Frankowski	(United States) Katharine Odgen

==== Nor-Am Cup ====
Key: C – Classic / F – Freestyle
Stage	Date	Place	Discipline	Winner	Second	Third
1	6 January 2022	(Canada) Canmore	Sprint F	(Canada) Laura Leclair	(Canada) Cendrine Browne	(Canada) Olivia Bouffard-Nesbitt
2	8 January 2022	(Canada) Canmore	10 km C	(Canada) Katherine Stewart-Jones	(Canada) Dahria Beatty	(Canada) Cendrine Browne
3	9 January 2022	(Canada) Canmore	15 km F Mass Start	(Canada) Katherine Stewart-Jones	(Canada) Cendrine Browne	(Canada) Jasmine Drolet
3	11 January 2022	(Canada) Canmore	Sprint C	(Canada) Olivia Bouffard-Nesbitt	(Canada) Katherine Stewart-Jones	(Canada) Laurence Dumais
