= 2019–20 Scandinavian Cup =

Discipline	Men	Women
Overall	(Norway) Gjøran Tefre	(Norway) Julie Myhre
Distance	(Norway) Johan Hoel	(Sweden) Linn Sömskar
Sprint	(Norway) Kasper Stadaas	(Norway) Julie Myhre

Competition
Locations	2 venues	2 venues
Individual	6 events	6 events
Cancelled	3 events	3 events

The 2019–20 Scandinavian Cup was a season of the Scandinavian Cup, a Continental Cup season in cross-country skiing for men and women. The season began on 13 December 2019 in Vuokatti, Finland and concluded on 5 January 2020 in Nes, Norway. The season was scheduled to conclude with a stage event 13–15 March 2020 in Otepää, Estonia. The stage event was rescheduled to Harstad, Norway, due to lack of snow in Otepää. Due to the COVID-19 pandemic in Norway, the stage event was cancelled, thus the season ended on 5 January 2020.

== Calendar ==
=== Men ===
Key: C – Classic / F – Freestyle
Period	Race	Date	Place	Discipline	Winner	Second	Third	Ref.
I	1	13 December 2019	(Finland) Vuokatti	Sprint C	(Norway) Thomas Helland Larsen	(Norway) Martin Løwstrøm Nyenget	(Norway) Jørgen Lippert	
I	2	14 December 2019	(Finland) Vuokatti	30 km C Mass Start	(Norway) Eirik Sverdrup Augdal	(Norway) Martin Løwstrøm Nyenget	(Norway) Vebjørn Turtveit	
I	3	15 December 2019	(Finland) Vuokatti	15 km F	(Norway) Jan Thomas Jenssen	(Norway) Vebjørn Turtveit	(Norway) Gjøran Tefre	
II	4	3 January 2020	(Norway) Nes	Sprint F	(Norway) Håvard Solås Taugbøl	(Norway) Pål Trøan Aune	(Norway) Harald Astrup Arnesen	
II	5	4 January 2020	(Norway) Nes	30 km F	(Norway) Finn Hågen Krogh	(Norway) Mattis Stenshagen	(Norway) Daniel Stock	
II	6	5 January 2020	(Norway) Nes	15 km C	(Norway) Magnus Stensås	(Norway) Håvard Solås Taugbøl	(Norway) Johan Hoel	
III		13 March 2020	(Norway) Harstad	Sprint C	Cancelled due to the coronavirus outbreak			
III		14 March 2020	(Norway) Harstad	15 km C	Cancelled due to the coronavirus outbreak			
III		15 March 2020	(Norway) Harstad	15 km F Pursuit	Cancelled due to the coronavirus outbreak			
III	Mini-tour Overall (13–15 March 2020)				Cancelled due to the coronavirus outbreak			

=== Women ===
Key: C – Classic / F – Freestyle
Period	Race	Date	Place	Discipline	Winner	Second	Third	Ref.
I	1	13 December 2019	(Finland) Vuokatti	Sprint C	(Norway) Silje Øyre Slind	(Norway) Julie Myhre	(Sweden) Johanna Hagström	
I	2	14 December 2019	(Finland) Vuokatti	20 km C Mass Start	(Sweden) Maria Nordström	(Norway) Tiril Liverud Knudsen	(Sweden) Linn Sömskar	
I	3	15 December 2019	(Finland) Vuokatti	10 km F	(Norway) Julie Myhre	(Sweden) Linn Sömskar	(Norway) Johanne Hauge Harviken	
II	4	3 January 2020	(Norway) Nes	Sprint F	(Norway) Anikken Gjerde Alnæs	(Norway) Julie Myhre	(Sweden) Tilde Bångman	
II	5	4 January 2020	(Norway) Nes	20 km F	(Norway) Helene Marie Fossesholm	(Sweden) Moa Olsson	(Sweden) Linn Sömskar	
II	6	5 January 2020	(Norway) Nes	10 km C	(Sweden) Anna Dyvik	(Sweden) Evelina Settlin	(Sweden) Moa Olsson	
III		13 March 2020	(Norway) Harstad	Sprint C	Cancelled due to the coronavirus outbreak			
III		14 March 2020	(Norway) Harstad	10 km C	Cancelled due to the coronavirus outbreak			
III		15 March 2020	(Norway) Harstad	10 km F Pursuit	Cancelled due to the coronavirus outbreak			
III	Mini-tour Overall (13–15 March 2020)				Cancelled due to the coronavirus outbreak			

== Men's standings ==
=== Overall ===
Rank		Points
1	(Norway) Gjøran Tefre	210
2	(Norway) Johan Hoel	188
3	(Norway) Harald Østberg Amundsen	176
	(Norway) Jørgen Sæternes Ulvang	176
5	(Norway) Daniel Stock	155
6	(Norway) Martin Løwstrøm Nyenget	151
7	(Norway) Eirik Sverdrup Augdal	147
8	(Norway) Mikael Gunnulfsen	130
9	(Norway) Johan Tjelle	124
10	(Norway) Eirik Mysen	122

=== Distance ===
Rank		Points
1	(Norway) Johan Hoel	157
2	(Norway) Daniel Stock	155
3	(Norway) Gjøran Tefre	136
4	(Norway) Jørgen Sæternes Ulvang	133
5	(Norway) Johan Tjelle	124
6	(Norway) Magne Haga	116
7	(Norway) Harald Østberg Amundsen	111
	(Norway) Eirik Sverdrup Augdal	111
9	(Norway) Jan Thomas Jenssen	103
10	(Norway) Vebjørn Turtveit	102

=== Sprint ===
Rank		Points
1	(Norway) Kasper Stadaas	77
2	(Norway) Gjøran Tefre	74
3	(Norway) Harald Østberg Amundsen	65
4	(Norway) Håvard Solås Taugbøl	60
	(Norway) Thomas Helland Larsen	60
6	(Norway) Harald Astrup Arnesen	58
7	(Norway) Martin Løwstrøm Nyenget	54
	(Norway) Pål Trøan Aune	54
9	(Norway) Amund Hoel	52
10	(Norway) Even Northug	50

== Women's standings ==
=== Overall ===
Rank		Points
1	(Norway) Julie Myhre	261
2	(Sweden) Linn Sömskar	242
3	(Sweden) Maria Nordström	223
4	(Norway) Tiril Liverud Knudsen	212
5	(Norway) Silje Øyre Slind	198
6	(Sweden) Anna Dyvik	172
	(Norway) Johanne Hauge Harviken	172
	(Norway) Marthe Bjørnsgaard	172
9	(Norway) Anikken Gjerde Alnæs	164
10	(Norway) Helene Marie Fossesholm	128

=== Distance ===
Rank		Points
1	(Sweden) Linn Sömskar	181
2	(Sweden) Maria Nordström	156
3	(Norway) Tiril Liverud Knudsen	153
	(Norway) Julie Myhre	153
5	(Norway) Marthe Bjørnsgaard	139
6	(Norway) Silje Øyre Slind	138
7	(Norway) Johanne Hauge Harviken	123
8	(Sweden) Moa Olsson	102
9	(Sweden) Anna Dyvik	101
10	(Norway) Helene Marie Fossesholm	100

=== Sprint ===
Rank		Points
1	(Norway) Julie Myhre	108
2	(Norway) Anikken Gjerde Alnæs	90
3	(Sweden) Jennie Öberg	73
4	(Sweden) Anna Dyvik	71
5	(Sweden) Maria Nordström	67
6	(Norway) Amalie Håkonsen Ous	63
7	(Sweden) Linn Sömskar	61
8	(Norway) Silje Øyre Slind	60
9	(Norway) Tiril Liverud Knudsen	59
10	(Norway) Johanne Hauge Harviken	49
