= Lauren Jortberg =

American cross-country skier (born 1997)

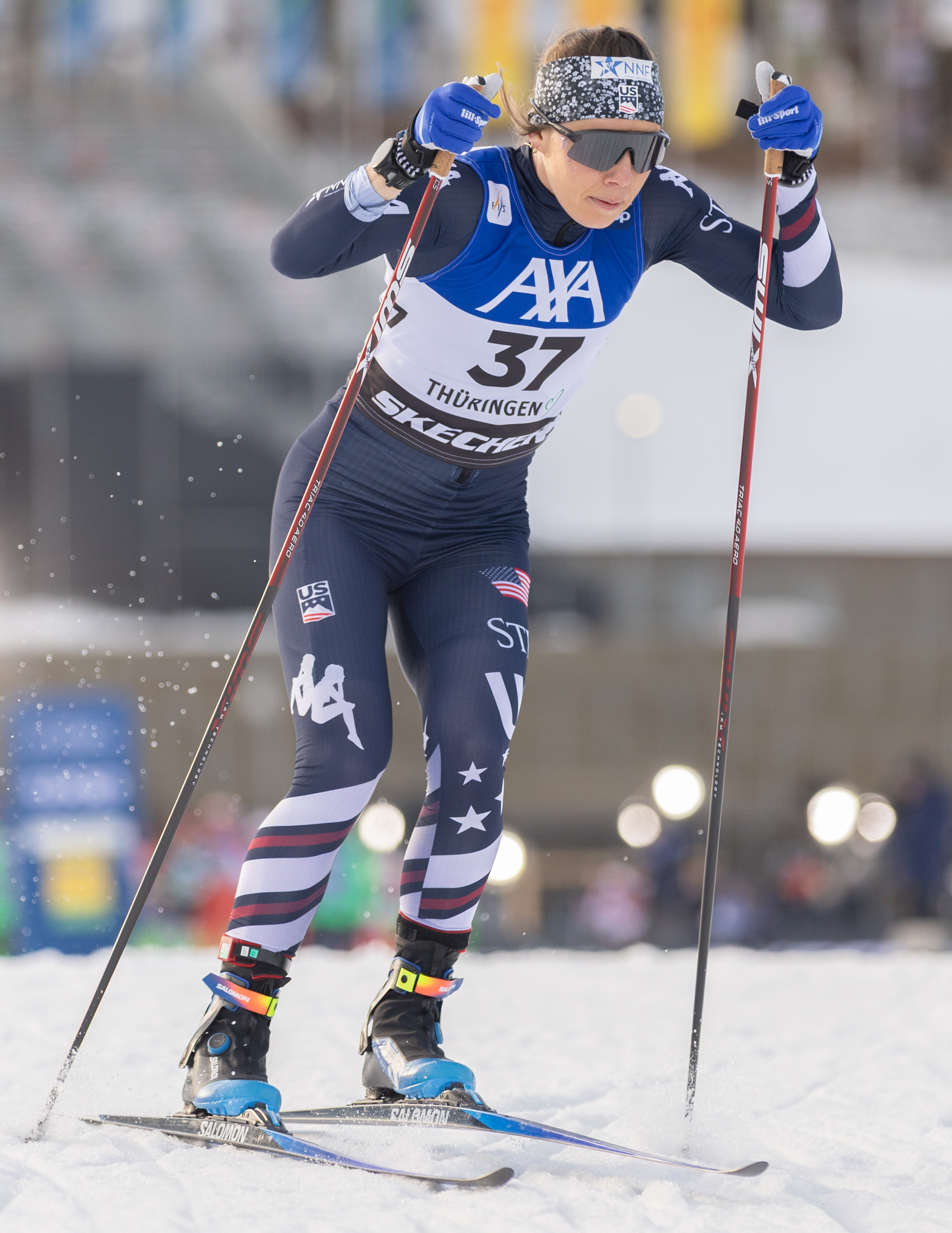
- Jortberg in 2026

Personal information
- Born: September 28, 1997 (age 29) Boulder, Colorado, U.S.

Sport
- Country: United States
- College team: Dartmouth Big Green

Achievements and titles
- Olympic finals: 1 – (2026)

Lauren Jortberg (born September 28, 1997) is an American cross-country skier. She represented the United States in cross-country skiing at the 2026 Winter Olympics.

== Early life and education ==
Jortberg was born on September 28, 1997 in Boulder, Colorado. In 2015, she took a postgraduate year at Stratton Mountain School before pursuing a degree in environmental science from Dartmouth College, where she was a member of Kappa Delta Epsilon and served as captain of the Dartmouth Ski Team.

== Career ==
She competed at the 2021–2022, 2022–2023, and 2023–24 FIS Cross-Country Continental Cup. She also competed at the 2021–22 FIS Cross-Country Continental Cup.

Jortberg made the United States Olympic team in 2026. She competed in the women's cross-country sprint on February 10, 2026. She ranked 30th in the qualifier and 6th in the first quarterfinal.

== Cross-country skiing results ==
All results are sourced from the International Ski Federation (FIS).

=== Olympic Games ===
Year	Age	Individual	Skiathlon	Mass start	Sprint	Relay	Team sprint
2026	28	—	—	—	30	—	—
