= Dmitry Yaparov =

Russian cross-country skier

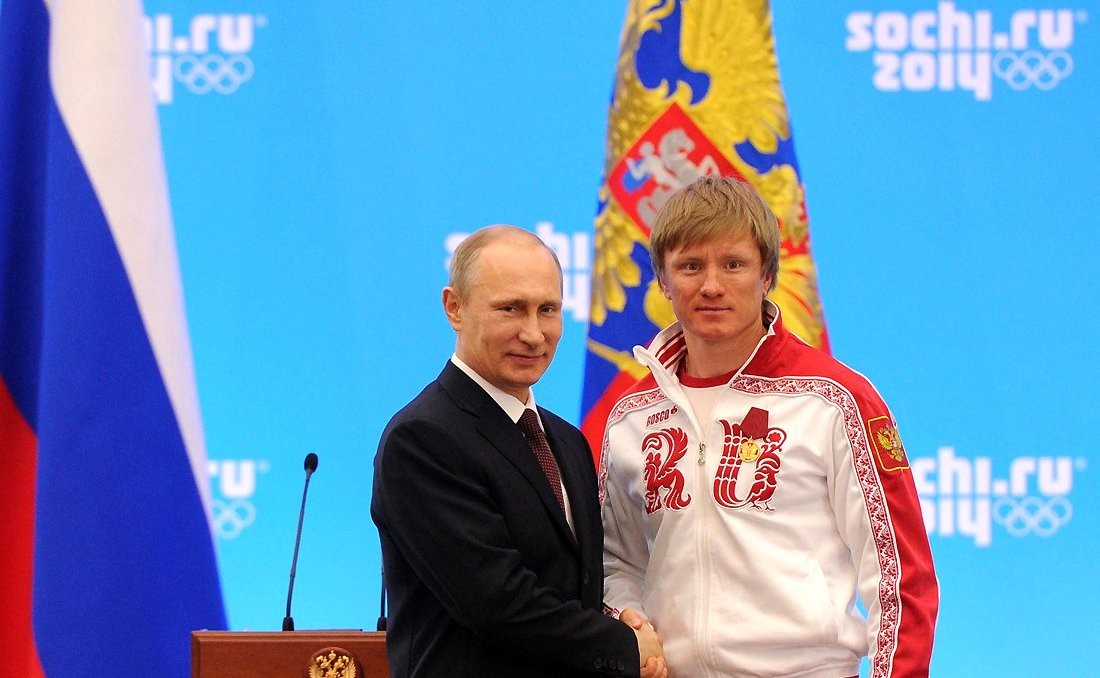
- Yaparov (right) with Vladimir Putin in February, 2014

Personal information
- Full name: Dmitry Semyonovich Yaparov
- Nationality: Russia
- Born: 1 January 1986 (age 40) Mozhga, Udmurt ASSR, Soviet Union
- Height: 1.78 m (5 ft 10 in)

Sport
- Sport: Skiing

World Cup career
- Seasons: 8 – (2011–2018)
- Indiv. starts: 81
- Indiv. podiums: 1
- Indiv. wins: 0
- Team starts: 10
- Team podiums: 3
- Team wins: 2
- Overall titles: 0 – (19th in 2013)
- Discipline titles: 0
Medal record
Men's cross-country skiing
Representing Russia
Olympic Games
Silver medal – second place	2014 Sochi	4 × 10 km relay

Dmitry Semyonovich Yaparov (Russian: Дмитрий Семёнович Япаров; born 1 January 1986) is a Russian cross-country skier.

== Career ==
He represented Russia at the 2014 Winter Olympics in Sochi. On 16 February he ran the first (classical) leg in the men's team relay, together with his team mates Aleksandr Bessmertnykh, Alexander Legkov and Maxim Vylegzhanin. They originally won a silver medal. In November 2017, his results at the 2014 Winter Olympics were annulled due to doping violations by his teammates. On 1 February 2018, their results were restored as a result of the successful appeal.

== Cross-country skiing results ==
All results are sourced from the International Ski Federation (FIS).

=== Olympic Games ===
- 1 medal – (1 silver)

Year	Age	15 km individual	30 km skiathlon	50 km mass start	Sprint	4 × 10 km relay	Team sprint
2014	28	16	—	—	—	Silver	—

=== World Championships ===
Year	Age	15 km individual	30 km skiathlon	50 km mass start	Sprint	4 × 10 km relay	Team sprint
2013	27	—	—	11	13	—	—

=== World Cup ===
==== Season standings ====
Season	Age	Discipline standings			Ski Tour standings			
Season	Age	Overall	Distance	Sprint	Nordic Opening	Tour de Ski	World Cup Final	Ski Tour Canada
2011	25	54	46	65	—	23	—	—N/a
2012	26	36	29	43	—	18	27	—N/a
2013	27	19	28	28	8	19	21	—N/a
2014	28	36	12	70	28	—	29	—N/a
2015	29	102	60	NC	57	32	—N/a	—N/a
2016	30	148	95	—	—	—	—N/a	—
2017	31	84	53	—	—	—	—	—N/a
2018	32	NC	NC	—	—	—	—	—N/a

==== Individual podiums ====
- 1 podium – (1 SWC)

No.	Season	Date	Location	Race	Level	Place
1	2013–14	30 November 2013	Rukatunturi, Finland	10 km Individual C	Stage World Cup	3rd

==== Team podiums ====
- 2 victories – (1 RL, 1 TS)
- 3 podiums – (2 RL, 1 TS)

No.	Season	Date	Location	Race	Level	Place	Teammate(s)
1	2011–12	12 February 2012	Nové Město, Czech Republic	4 × 10 km Relay C/F	World Cup	2nd	Volzhentsev / Glavatskikh / Vylegzhanin
2	2012–13	3 February 2013	Sochi, Russia	6 × 1.8 km Team Sprint C	World Cup	1st	Vylegzhanin
3	2013–14	8 December 2013	Lillehammer, Norway	4 × 7.5 km Relay C/F	World Cup	1st	Bessmertnykh / Legkov / Vylegzhanin
