= Magni Smedås =

Norwegian cross-country skier

Personal information
- Nationality: Norway
- Born: 17 June 1995 (age 31)

Sport
- Sport: Skiing
- Club: Lillehammer SK

World Cup career
- Seasons: 5 – (2019–present)
- Indiv. starts: 21
- Indiv. podiums: 0
- Team starts: 2
- Team podiums: 0
- Overall titles: 0 – (39th in 2020)
- Discipline titles: 0
- Updated on 27 March 2023

Magni Smedås (born 17 June 1995) is a Norwegian cross-country skier.

She competed in three events at the 2013 European Youth Olympic Winter Festival, collecting 17th and 23rd places. She made her World Cup debut in February 2019 in the sprint event at Cogne, collecting her first World Cup points with a 25th place. Competing in three more World Cup races on the 2018–2019 circuit, she made her breakthrough in December 2019 when finishing 8th in the 10 kilometres event in Davos. On 29 January 2023, she won Marcialonga.

She represents the sports club Lillehammer SK. She hails from Os i Østerdalen and is a second cousin of Therese Johaug.

== Cross-country skiing results ==
All results are sourced from the International Ski Federation (FIS).

=== World Cup ===
==== Season standings ====
Season	Age	Discipline standings			Ski Tour standings			
Season	Age	Overall	Distance	Sprint	Nordic Opening	Tour de Ski	Ski Tour 2020	World Cup Final
2019	23	110	NC	74	—	—	—N/a	—
2020	24	39	31	53	—	20	—	—N/a
2021	25	67	—	38	—	—	—N/a	—N/a
2022	26	81	—	51	—N/a	—	—N/a	—N/a
2023	27	95	79	73	—N/a	—	—N/a	—N/a
