= Anastasia Rygalina =

Russian cross-country skier

Personal information
- Nationality: Russia
- Born: Anastasia Alekseyevna Rygalina; 31 January 1996 (age 30) Bogoroditsk, Russia

Sport
- Sport: Skiing

World Cup career
- Seasons: 1 – (2022)
- Indiv. starts: 12
- Indiv. podiums: 0
- Team starts: 1
- Team podiums: 0
- Overall titles: 0 – (48th in 2022)
- Discipline titles: 0
- Updated on 19 March 2022

Anastasia Alekseyevna Rygalina (Russian: Анастасия Алексеевна Рыгалина; born 31 January 1996) is a Russian cross-country skier. She competed in the Women's 10 kilometre classical, and Women's 15 kilometre skiathlon, at the 2022 Winter Olympics.

She competed in the 2021–22 FIS Cross-Country World Cup.

== Cross-country skiing results ==
All results are sourced from the International Ski Federation (FIS).

=== Olympic Games ===
Year	Age	10 km individual	15 km skiathlon	30 km mass start	Sprint	4 × 5 km relay	Team sprint
2022	26	—	8	17	—	—	—

=== World Cup ===
==== Season standings ====
Season	Age	Discipline standings			Ski Tour standings
Season	Age	Overall	Distance	Sprint	Tour de Ski
2022 (Note: On 1 March 2022, following the 2022 Russian invasion of Ukraine, FIS decided to not allow athletes from Russian and Belarus to take part in FIS competitions, with an immediate effect.)	26	48	30	NC	25
