= Eirik Sverdrup Augdal =

Norwegian cross-country skier

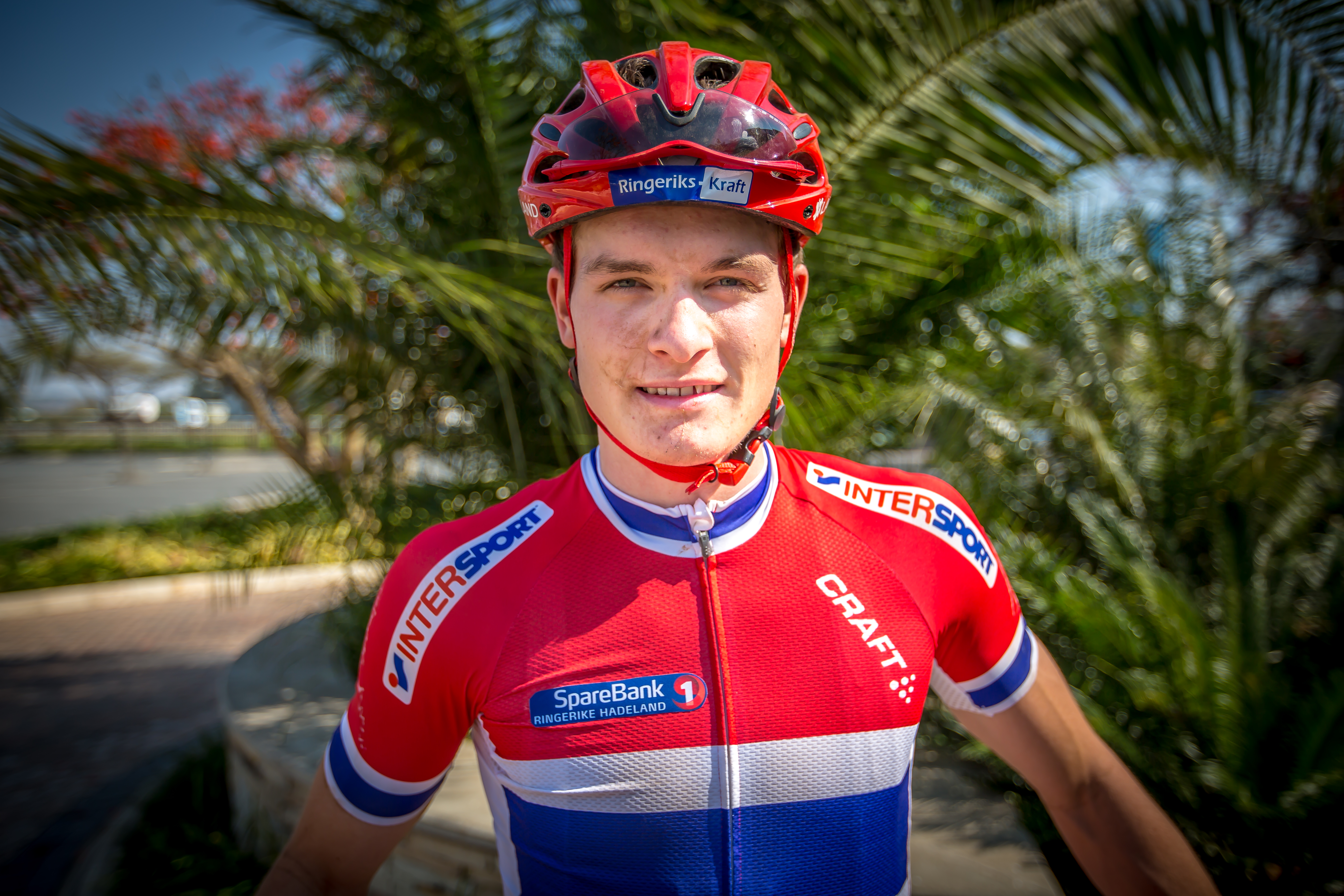
- Eirik Sverdrup Augdal, was a Norwegian cross-country skier.

Personal information
- Nationality: Norway
- Born: 20 July 1995 (age 30) Haugsbygd, Norway

Sport
- Sport: Skiing
- Club: Ringkollen SK

World Cup career
- Seasons: 4 – (2016, 2018–2020)
- Indiv. starts: 6
- Indiv. podiums: 0
- Team starts: 0
- Overall titles: 0 – (67th in 2020)
Medal record
Men's cross-country skiing
Representing Norway
Junior World Championships
| Gold medal – first place | 2014 Val di Fiemme | 20 km skiathlon |
| Gold medal – first place | 2014 Val di Fiemme | 4 × 5 km relay |
- Updated on 22 December 2021

Eirik Sverdrup Augdal (born 20 July 1995) is a Norwegian cross-country skier.

He competed in five events at the 2013 European Youth Olympic Winter Festival, winning a silver and a bronze medal. At the 2014 Junior World Championships he won two gold medals, also competing at the 2015, 2016 and 2018 Junior World Championships with a fourth place at best.

He made his World Cup debut in February 2016 in the Holmenkollen 50 km race, collecting his first World Cup points in January 2018 in Seefeld where he finished 20th in the 15 kilometres. He improved to a 14th place in the March 2018 edition of the Holmenkollen 50 km.

He represents the sports club Ringkollen SK.

== Cross-country skiing results ==
All results are sourced from the International Ski Federation (FIS).

=== World Cup ===
==== Season standings ====
| Season | Age | Discipline standings | | | Ski Tour standings | | | | |
| Season | Age | Overall | Distance | Sprint | Nordic Opening | Tour de Ski | Ski Tour 2020 | World Cup Final | Ski Tour Canada |
|---|---|---|---|---|---|---|---|---|---|
| 2016 | 20 | NC | NC | — | — | — | —N/a | —N/a | — |
| 2018 | 22 | 94 | 62 | — | — | — | —N/a | — | —N/a |
| 2019 | 23 | NC | NC | — | — | — | —N/a | — | —N/a |
| 2020 | 24 | 67 | 44 | — | — | — | — | —N/a | —N/a |
