= Kononovskaya =

Kononovskaya Кононовская
- Village
- Location within Arkhangelsk Oblast Location within Russia
- Coordinates: 61°06′N 43°27′E
- Country: Russia
- Region: Arkhangelsk Oblast
- District: Ustyansky District
- Time zone: UTC+3:00

Kononovskaya (Russian: Кононовская) is a rural locality (a village) in Ustyansky District, Arkhangelsk Oblast, Russia. The population was 86 as of 2012. There are 7 streets.

== Geography ==
It is located on the Ustya River.
