= Olga Schuchkina =

Russian cross-country skier

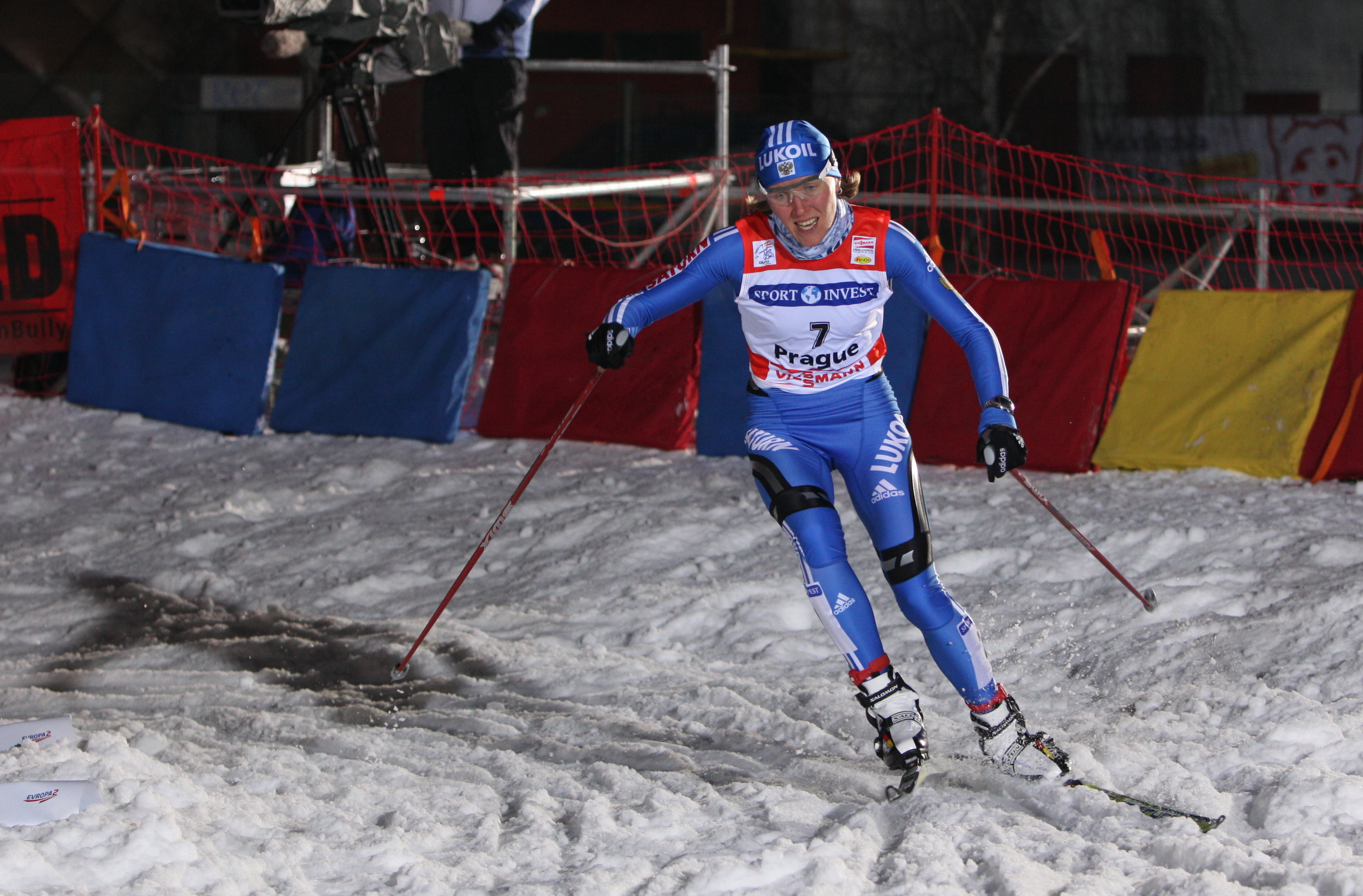
- Olga Schuchkina in 2010

Personal information
- Nationality: Russia
- Born: 30 October 1980 (age 45) Syktyvkar, Soviet Union

Sport
- Sport: Skiing

World Cup career
- Seasons: 7 – (2003–2006, 2009–2011)
- Indiv. starts: 43
- Indiv. podiums: 1
- Indiv. wins: 0
- Team starts: 9
- Team podiums: 0
- Overall titles: 0 – (36th in 2010)
- Discipline titles: 0
Medal record
Women's cross-country skiing
Representing Russia
U23 World Championships
Gold medal – first place	2003 Valdidentro	10 km skiathlon

Olga Schuchkina (born 30 October 1980) is a Russian cross-country skier who competed between 2002 and 2014. She finished 38th in the 30 km event at the 2010 Winter Olympics in Vancouver.

Her best World Cup finish was third in a 15 km mixed pursuit event at Russia in January 2010.

== Cross-country skiing results ==
All results are sourced from the International Ski Federation (FIS).

=== Olympic Games ===
Year	Age	10 km individual	15 km skiathlon	30 km mass start	Sprint	4 × 5 km relay	Team sprint
2010	29	—	—	37	—	—	—

=== World Cup ===
==== Season standings ====
Season	Age	Discipline standings			Ski Tour standings		
Season	Age	Overall	Distance	Sprint	Nordic Opening	Tour de Ski	World Cup Final
2003	22	91	—N/a	63	—N/a	—N/a	—N/a
2004	23	NC	NC	NC	—N/a	—N/a	—N/a
2005	24	NC	NC	NC	—N/a	—N/a	—N/a
2006	25	66	54	65	—N/a	—N/a	—N/a
2009	28	96	68	NC	—N/a	—	—
2010	29	36	28	53	—N/a	13	—
2011	30	90	91	64	DNF	—	—

==== Individual podiums ====
- 1 podium

No.	Season	Date	Location	Race	Level	Place
1	2009–10	23 January 2010	Rybinsk, Russia	7.5 km + 7.5 km Skiathlon C/F	World Cup	3rd
