= Cross-country skiing at the 2013 European Youth Olympic Winter Festival =

Cross country skiing at the 2013 European Youth Olympic Winter Festival
- Venue: Valea Râşnoavei Sport Center, Predeal
- Date: 18–22 February

Cross-country skiing at the 2013 European Youth Olympic Winter Festival is held at the Valea Râşnoavei Sport Center in Predeal, Romania from 18 to 22 February 2013.

== Results ==
=== Medal table ===
| Rank | Nation | Gold | Silver | Bronze | Total |
|---|---|---|---|---|---|
| 1 | Russia (RUS) | 4 | 3 | 1 | 8 |
| 2 | Germany (GER) | 2 | 2 | 1 | 5 |
| 3 | Norway (NOR) | 1 | 2 | 2 | 5 |
| 4 | Slovenia (SLO) | 0 | 0 | 2 | 2 |
| 5 | Finland (FIN) | 0 | 0 | 1 | 1 |
| Totals (5 entries) | | 7 | 7 | 7 | 21 |

=== Men's events ===
| Event | Gold | | Silver | | Bronze | |
|---|---|---|---|---|---|---|
| 7.5 km Classic | Aleksey Chervotkin (RUS) | 18:49.4 | Ole Jørgen Bruvoll (NOR) | 18:58.9 | Marius Cebulla (GER) | 19:11.2 |
| 10 km Freestyle | Aleksey Chervotkin (RUS) | 24:25.0 | Evgeniy Vakhrushev (RUS) | 24:58.6 | Ole Jørgen Bruvoll (NOR) | 25:06.6 |
| Sprint | Aksel Rosenvinge (NOR) | — | Eirik Sverdrup Augdal (NOR) | — | Lauri Vuorinen (FIN) | — |

=== Ladies events ===
| Event | Gold | | Silver | | Bronze | |
|---|---|---|---|---|---|---|
| 5 km Classic | Anastasia Sedova (RUS) | 13:54.0 | Victoria Carl (GER) | 13:56.1 | Natalia Nepryaeva (RUS) | 13:57.7 |
| 7.5 km Freestyle | Victoria Carl (GER) | 20:15.3 | Anastasia Sedova (RUS) | 20:51.7 | Anamarija Lampič (SLO) | 21:05.5 |
| Sprint | Victoria Carl (GER) | — | Natalia Nepryaeva (RUS) | — | Anamarija Lampič (SLO) | — |

=== Mixed events ===
| Event | Gold | | Silver | | Bronze | |
|---|---|---|---|---|---|---|
| Relay | Russia (RUS); Alexander Bakanov; Natalia Nepryaeva; Aleksey Chervotkin; Anastasia Sedova | 56:09.7 | Germany (GER); Adrian Schuler; Katharina Hennig; Marius Cebulla; Victoria Carl | 57:36.9 | Norway (NOR); Eirik Sverdrup Augdal; Lotta Udnes Weng; Ole Jørgen Bruvoll; Tiril Udnes Weng | 58:35.9 |
