= Harald Astrup Arnesen =

Norwegian cross-country skier

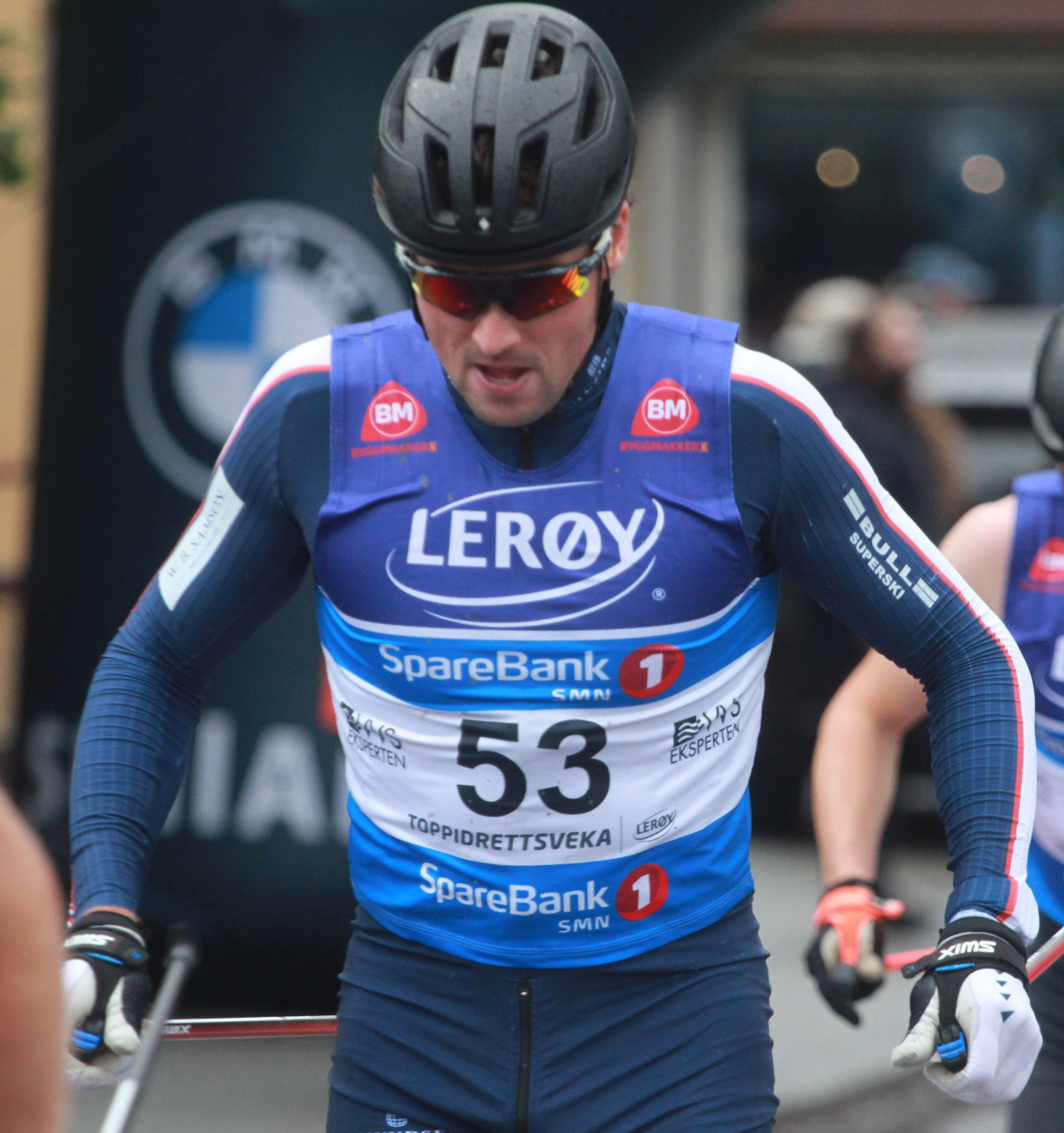

Personal information
- Nationality: Norway
- Born: 24 April 1995 (age 31)

Sport
- Sport: Skiing
- Club: IL Heming

World Cup career
- Seasons: 2 – (2020, 2022–present)
- Indiv. starts: 3
- Indiv. podiums: 0
- Team starts: 0
- Overall titles: 0 – (74th in 2020)
- Discipline titles: 0
- Updated on 28 March 2022

Harald Astrup Arnesen (born 24 April 1995) is a Norwegian cross-country skier.

He made his World Cup debut in January 2020 in Dresden, collecting his first World Cup points with an 8th place.

He represents the sports club IL Heming.

== Cross-country skiing results ==
All results are sourced from the International Ski Federation (FIS).

=== World Cup ===
==== Season standings ====
Season	Age	Discipline standings			Ski Tour standings		
Season	Age	Overall	Distance	Sprint	Nordic Opening	Tour de Ski	Ski Tour 2020
2020	24	74	—	35	—	—	—
2022	26	120	—	67	—N/a	—	—N/a
