= Konstantin Glavatskikh =

Russian cross-country skier

Personal information
- Full name: Konstantin Nikolayevich Glavatskikh
- Nationality: Russia
- Born: 16 April 1985 (age 41) Udmurtia, Soviet Union

Sport
- Sport: Skiing

World Cup career
- Seasons: 8 – (2010–2017)
- Indiv. starts: 46
- Indiv. podiums: 0
- Team starts: 4
- Team podiums: 1
- Team wins: 0
- Overall titles: 0 – (39th in 2012)
- Discipline titles: 0
- Updated on 29 April 2019

Konstantin Nikolayevich Glavatskikh (Russian: Константин Николаевич Главатских; born 16 April 1985 in Udmurtia, Soviet Union) is a cross-country skier from Russia. He competed for Russia at the 2014 Winter Olympics in the cross-country skiing events.

== Cross-country skiing results ==
All results are sourced from the International Ski Federation (FIS).

=== Olympic Games ===
Year	Age	15 km individual	30 km skiathlon	50 km mass start	Sprint	4 × 10 km relay	Team sprint
2014	28	—	—	38	—	—	—

=== World Championships ===
Year	Age	15 km individual	30 km skiathlon	50 km mass start	Sprint	4 × 10 km relay	Team sprint
2011	25	—	—	29	—	—	—

=== World Cup ===
==== Season standings ====
Season	Age	Discipline standings			Ski Tour standings			
Season	Age	Overall	Distance	Sprint	Nordic Opening	Tour de Ski	World Cup Final	Ski Tour Canada
2010	24	71	42	—	—N/a	—	—	—N/a
2011	25	98	55	NC	—	—	—	—N/a
2012	26	39	21	NC	—	—	31	—N/a
2013	27	86	55	NC	—	36	—	—N/a
2014	28	70	57	NC	—	23	—	—N/a
2015	29	52	35	—	—	—	—N/a	—N/a
2016	30	NC	NC	NC	—	48	—N/a	—
2017	31	68	37	—	—	—	—	—N/a

==== Team podiums ====
- 1 podium – (1 RL)

No.	Season	Date	Location	Race	Level	Place	Teammate(s)
1	2011–12	12 January 2012	Nové Město, Czech Republic	4 × 10 km Relay C/F	World Cup	2nd	Yaparov / Volzhentsev / Vylegzhanin
