= Stanislav Volzhentsev =

Russian cross-country skier

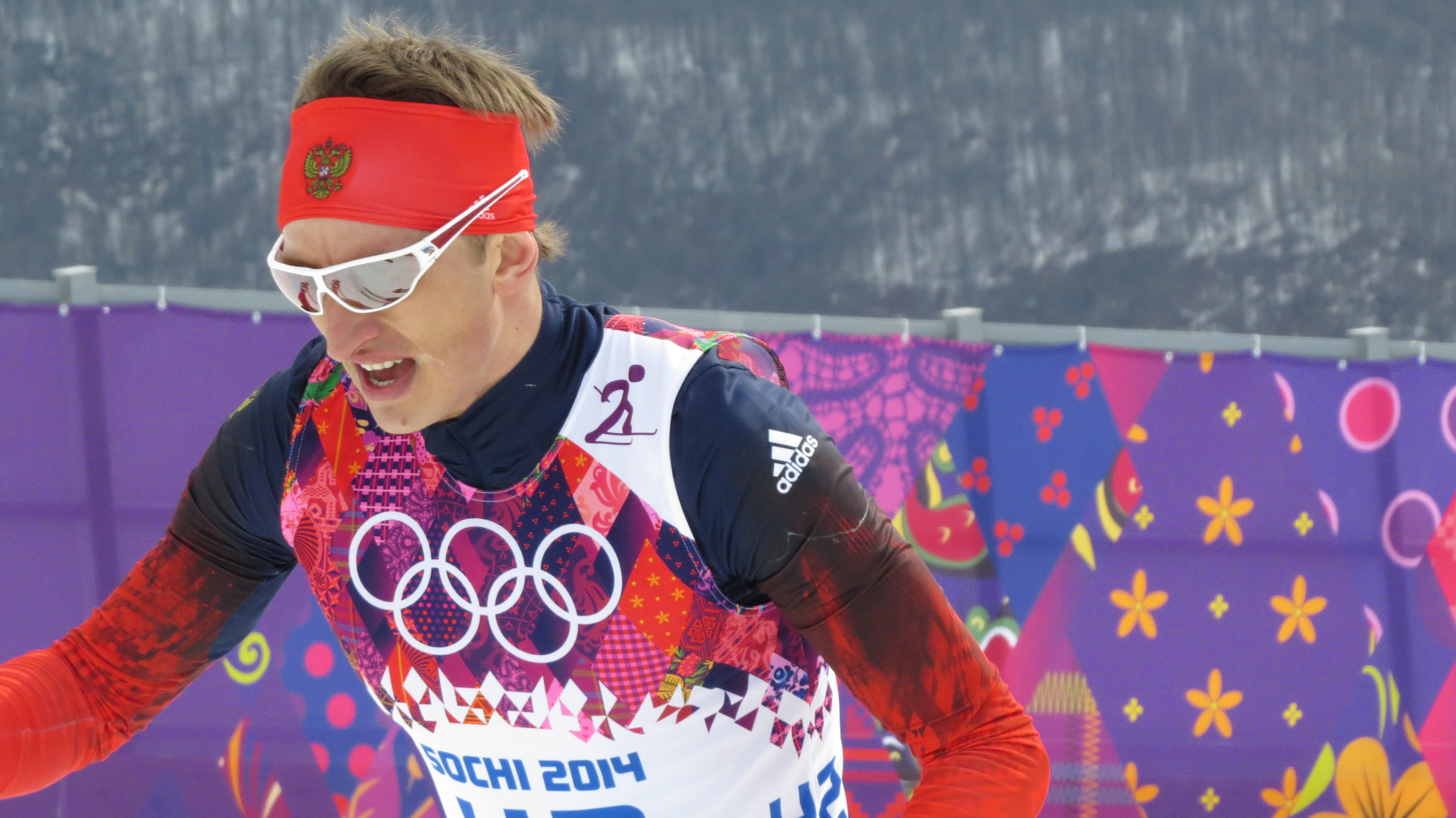
- Stanislav Volzhentsev in 2014

Personal information
- Full name: Stanislav Valentinovich Volzhentsev
- Nationality: Russia
- Born: 29 October 1985 (age 40) Orsk, Soviet Union

Sport
- Sport: Skiing

World Cup career
- Seasons: 11 – (2008–2018)
- Indiv. starts: 95
- Indiv. podiums: 1
- Indiv. wins: 0
- Team starts: 4
- Team podiums: 1
- Team wins: 0
- Overall titles: 0 – (23rd in 2015)
- Discipline titles: 0
Medal record
Men's cross-country skiing
Representing Russia
U23 World Championships
Silver medal – second place	2007 Tarvisio	30 km skiathlon

Stanislav Valentinovich Volzhentsev (Russian: Станислав Валентинович Волженцев; born 29 October 1985 in Orsk, Soviet Union) is a Russian cross-country skier.

He competed at the FIS Nordic World Ski Championships 2011 in Oslo, and placed fourth in 15 kilometre classical.

== Cross-country skiing results ==
All results are sourced from the International Ski Federation (FIS).

=== Olympic Games ===
Year	Age	15 km individual	30 km skiathlon	50 km mass start	Sprint	4 × 10 km relay	Team sprint
2014	28	19	—	—	—	—	—

=== World Championships ===
Year	Age	15 km individual	30 km skiathlon	50 km mass start	Sprint	4 × 10 km relay	Team sprint
2011	25	4	—	—	—	7	—
2015	29	—	13	DNF	—	—	—
2017	31	22	—	—	—	—	—

=== World Cup ===
==== Season standings ====
Season	Age	Discipline standings			Ski Tour standings			
Season	Age	Overall	Distance	Sprint	Nordic Opening	Tour de Ski	World Cup Final	Ski Tour Canada
2008	22	135	76	NC	—N/a	48	—	—N/a
2009	23	174	107	NC	—N/a	—	61	—N/a
2010	24	154	99	—	—N/a	—	—	—N/a
2011	25	72	40	—	—	—	—	—N/a
2012	26	59	38	NC	—	—	—	—N/a
2013	27	NC	NC	NC	—	—	—	—N/a
2014	28	37	18	70	—	DNF	20	—N/a
2015	29	23	19	NC	—	14	—N/a	—N/a
2016	30	37	26	59	25	28	—N/a	40
2017	31	78	57	NC	22	—	—	—N/a
2018	32	57	40	NC	—	26	—	—N/a

==== Individual podiums ====
- 1 podium – (1 SWC)

No.	Season	Date	Location	Race	Level	Place
1	2013–14	1 January 2014	Lenzerheide, Switzerland	15 km Mass Start C	Stage World Cup	3rd

==== Team podiums ====
- 1 podium – (1 RL)

No.	Season	Date	Location	Race	Level	Place	Teammates
1	2011–12	12 February 2012	Nové Město, Czech Republic	4 × 10 km Relay C/F	World Cup	2nd	Yaparov / Glavatskikh / Vylegzhanin
