= Vebjørn Turtveit =

Norwegian cross-country skier (born 1994)

Personal information
- Nationality: Norway
- Born: 12 July 1994 (age 32) Voss Municipality, Norway

Sport
- Sport: Skiing
- Club: Voss IL

World Cup career
- Seasons: 4 – (2016, 2019–2020, 2022–present)
- Indiv. starts: 11
- Indiv. podiums: 0
- Team starts: 1
- Team podiums: 0
- Overall titles: 0 – (78th in 2019)
- Discipline titles: 0
- Updated on 28 March 2022

Vebjørn Turtveit (born 12 August 1994) is a Norwegian cross-country skier.

He competed in one event at the 2013 Junior World Championships, recording a 13th place in the skiathlon. He made his World Cup debut in February 2016 in Oslo, also breaking the top 30-barrier with a 25th place in the Holmenkollen Ski Festival's 50 kilometre race. In December 2018 he collected his next World Cup points, at Beitostølen, later improving his career best placement to 8th in February 2019 in Cogne. In 2019 he also improved to a 17th place in the Holmenkollen 50 km.

He represents the sports club Voss IL.

== Cross-country skiing results ==
All results are sourced from the International Ski Federation (FIS).

=== World Cup ===
==== Season standings ====
Season	Age	Discipline standings			Ski Tour standings				
Season	Age	Overall	Distance	Sprint	Nordic Opening	Tour de Ski	Ski Tour 2020	World Cup Final	Ski Tour Canada
2016	21	137	85	—	—	—	—N/a	—N/a	—
2019	24	78	49	NC	50	—	—N/a	—	—N/a
2020	25	101	57	—	—	—	—	—N/a	—N/a
2022	27	90	52	—	—N/a	—	—N/a	—N/a	—N/a
