= Gjøran Tefre =

Norwegian cross-country skier

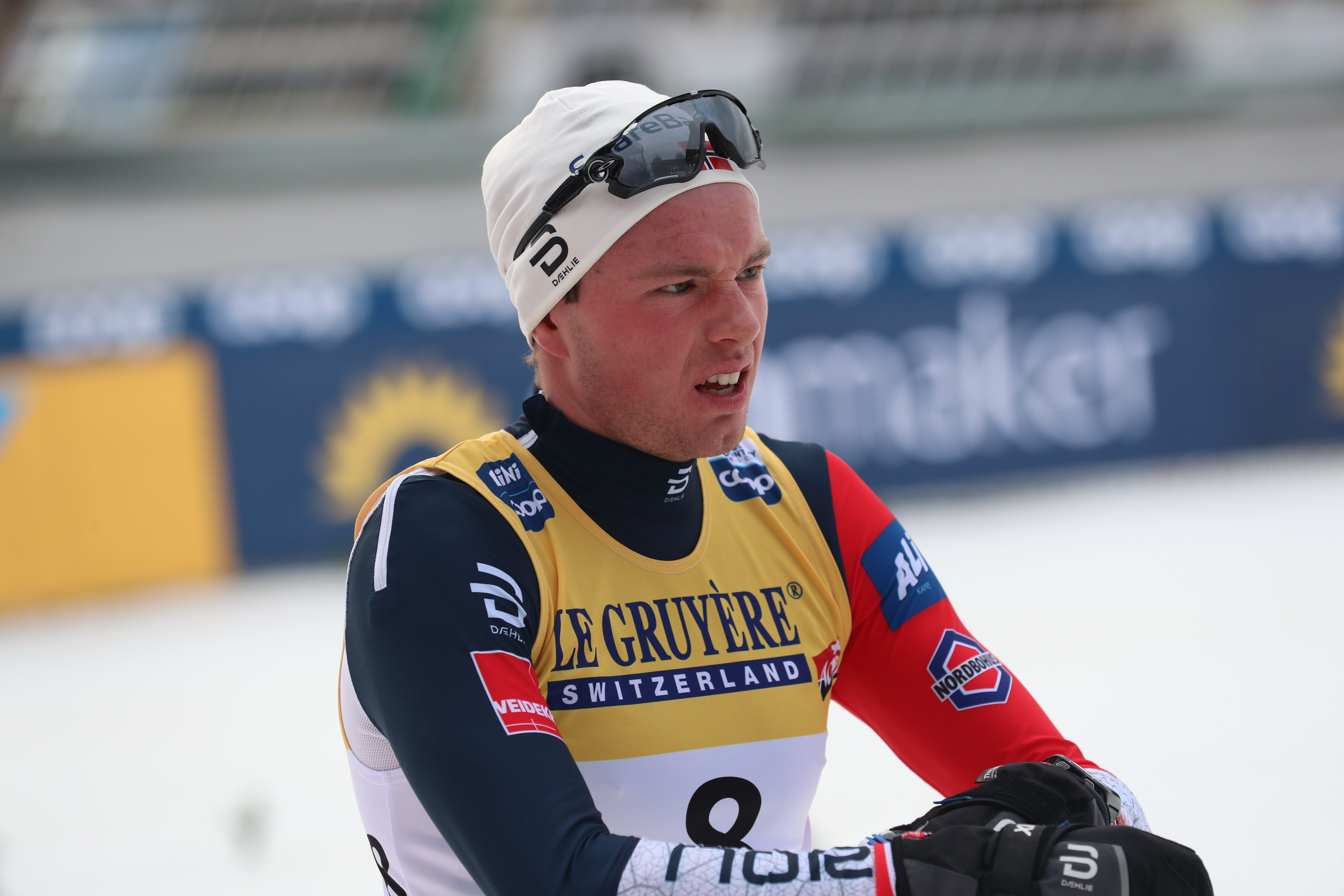
- Gjøran Tefre in January, 2019

Personal information
- Nationality: Norway
- Born: 25 November 1994 (age 31)

Sport
- Sport: Skiing
- Club: Førde IL

World Cup career
- Seasons: 7 – (2016, 2018–2020, 2022–2024)
- Indiv. starts: 21
- Indiv. podiums: 1
- Team starts: 1
- Team podiums: 1
- Team wins: 0
- Overall titles: 0 – (57th in 2020)
- Discipline titles: 0
- Updated on 17 March 2024

Gjøran Tefre (born 25 November 1994) is a Norwegian cross-country skier.

He made his World Cup debut in December 2015 in Lillehammer, collecting his first World Cup points in his next World Cup outing, which came as late as March 2018, when he finished 14th in the Lahti sprint. He improved slightly to a 13th place in November 2018 in Lillehammer, and repeated his 14th place in January 2019 in Dresden, both in sprint races.

He represents the sports club Førde IL.

== Cross-country skiing results ==
All results are sourced from the International Ski Federation (FIS).

=== World Cup ===
==== Season standings ====
Season	Age	Discipline standings				Ski Tour standings				
Season	Age	Overall	Distance	Sprint	U23	Nordic Opening	Tour de Ski	Ski Tour 2020	World Cup Final	Ski Tour Canada
2016	21	NC	NC	—	NC	—	—	—N/a	—N/a	—
2018	23	112	—	58	—N/a	—	—	—N/a	—	—N/a
2019	24	75	NC	37	—N/a	51	—	—N/a	—	—N/a
2020	25	57	80	25	—N/a	—	—	—	—N/a	—N/a
2022	27	89	—	51	—N/a	—N/a	—	—N/a	—N/a	—N/a
2023	28	86	—	38	—N/a	—N/a	—	—N/a	—N/a	—N/a
2024	29	104	63	—	—N/a	—N/a	—	—N/a	—N/a	—N/a

==== Individual podiums ====
- 1 podium – (1 WC, 0 SWC)

No.	Season	Date	Location	Race	Level	Place
1	2023–24	17 March 2024	Falun, Sweden	20 km Mass Start F	World Cup	2nd

==== Team podiums ====
- 1 podium – (1 TS)

No.	Season	Date	Location	Race	Level	Place	Teammate
1	2019–20	22 December 2019	Planica, Slovenia	6 × 1.2 km Team Sprint F	World Cup	2nd	Taugbøl
