= Raǔbičy =

Sports complex and ski resort near Minsk, Belarus

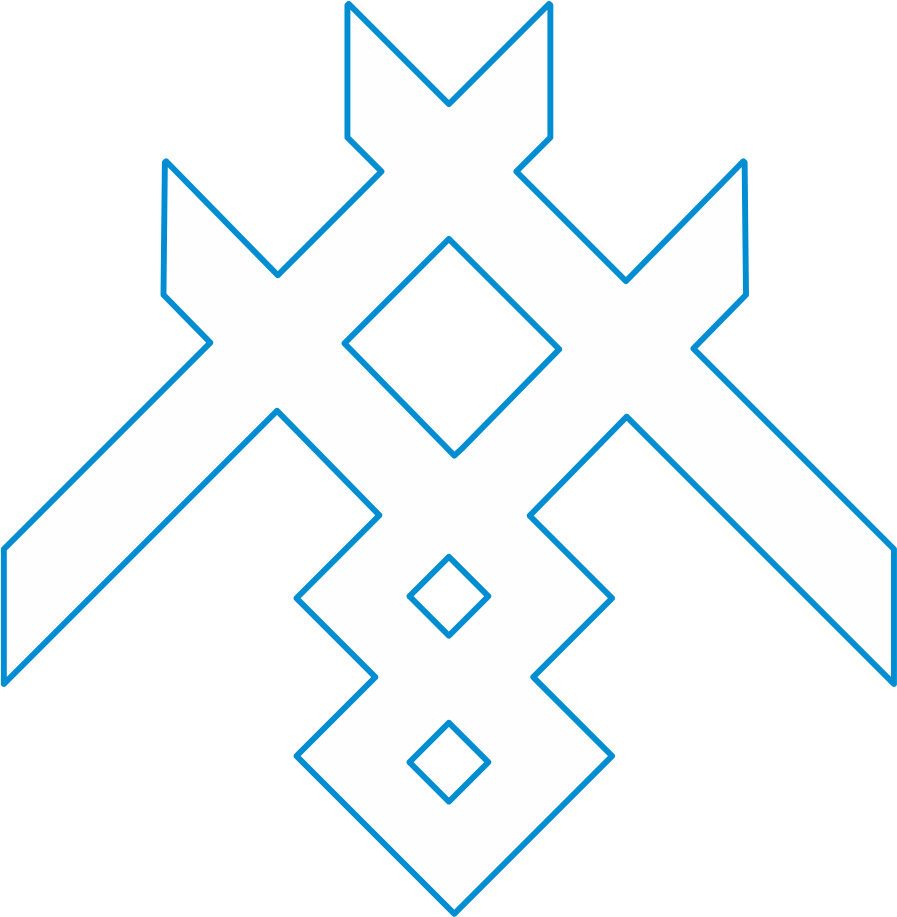

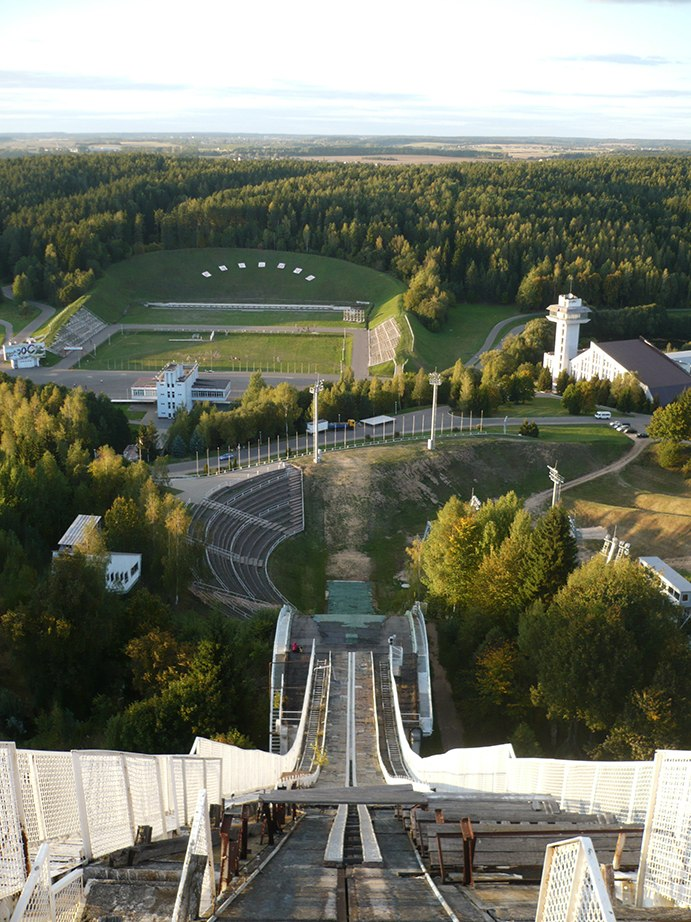
- Interactive map of Raǔbičy
- Location: Belarus
- Nearest city: Minsk
- Coordinates: 54°03′32″N 27°44′15″E
- Skiable area: 20.5 km (12.7 mi)
- Website: https://rau.by/

The Republican Centre of Olympic Training in Winter Sport Raǔbičy (Belarusian: Рэспубліканскі цэнтр алімпійскай падрыхтоўкі па зімовых відах спорту «Раўбічы», romanized: Respublikanski centr alimpijskaj padrychtoǔki pa zimovych vidach sportu "Raǔbičy", Russian: Республиканский центр олимпийской подготовки по зимним видам спорта «Раубичи», romanized: Respublikansky tsentr olimpiyskoy podgotovki po zimnim vidam sporta "Raubichi") is a sports complex and ski resort in Minsk, Belarus.

== History ==
Construction on the Republican Centre of Olympic Training in Winter Sport Raǔbičy began in February 1973, according to the vision of architect Valmen Aladaǔ and in preparation for the Biathlon World Championships 1974. The project was created with the support of then-First Secretary of the Communist Party of Byelorussia Pyotr Masherov, as it was closer to Minsk National Airport than the alternative proposal of a ski resort in Lahoysk (which eventually received its own ski resort, Silichy, in 2005). Raǔbičy was completed in time for the Biathlon World Championships, and again hosted the championships in 1982 and 1990.

During his presidency, President of Belarus Alexander Lukashenko has proposed several improvements to the complex, including an ice rink, football field, and indoor pool.

== Additional accommodations ==
Raǔbičy contains a bar and pizzeria, as well as three hotels and guest houses.
