= Kasper Stadaas =

Norwegian cross-country skier and writer

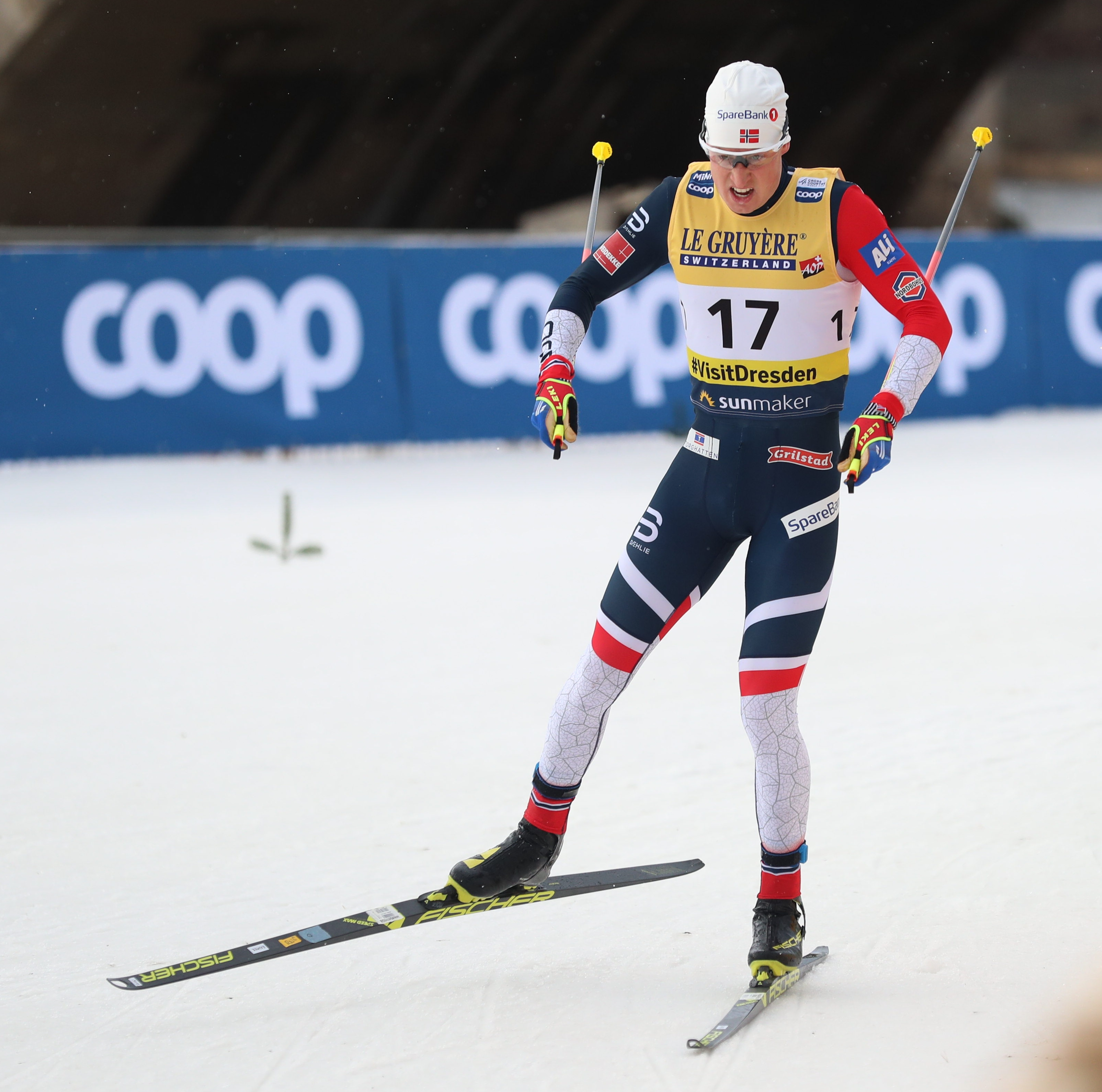
- Stadaas in January, 2019

Personal information
- Nationality: Norway
- Born: February 21, 1994 (age 32)

Sport
- Sport: Skiing
- Club: IL Heming

World Cup career
- Seasons: 4 – (2016, 2018–2020)
- Indiv. starts: 13
- Indiv. podiums: 0
- Team starts: 2
- Team podiums: 0
- Overall titles: 0 – (49th in 2018)
- Discipline titles: 0
- Updated on 25 December 2021

Kasper Stadaas (born 21 February 1994) is a Norwegian cross-country skier.

He competed at the 2013 World Junior Championships, finishing seventh in the sprint race.

He made his World Cup debut in February 2016 in Drammen, a sprint race. Competing in nothing but sprint, he made his breakthrough around New Years' 2018 with a seventh place in Lillehammer and a ninth place in Dresden. He improved his career best to a fifth place in March 2018 in Drammen, and again broke the top 10 in January 2020 Dresden.

He represents the sports club IL Heming.

== Cross-country skiing results ==
All results are sourced from the International Ski Federation (FIS).

=== World Cup ===
==== Season standings ====
| Season | Age | Discipline standings | | | Ski Tour standings | | | | |
| Season | Age | Overall | Distance | Sprint | Nordic Opening | Tour de Ski | Ski Tour 2020 | World Cup Final | Ski Tour Canada |
|---|---|---|---|---|---|---|---|---|---|
| 2016 | 22 | NC | — | NC | — | — | —N/a | —N/a | — |
| 2018 | 24 | 49 | — | 20 | — | — | —N/a | — | —N/a |
| 2019 | 25 | 85 | — | 43 | — | — | —N/a | — | —N/a |
| 2020 | 26 | 78 | — | 42 | — | — | — | —N/a | —N/a |
