= Vershina Tyoi =

Vershina Tyoi Вершина Тёи
- Urban-type settlement

Other transcription(s)
  - Khakas: Tӧӧ пазы
- Interactive map of Vershina Tyoi
- Location of Vershina Tyoi Vershina Tyoi (Khakassia)
- Coordinates: 53°15′57″N 89°33′46″E
- Country: Russia
- Federal subject: Khakassia
- Administrative district: Askizsky District
- Founded: 1957

Population (2010 Census)
  - Total: 3,756
  - Estimate (2025): 2,897 (−22.9%)

Municipal status
  - Municipal district: Askizsky Municipal District
  - Urban settlement: Vershino-Tyoysky Possovet Urban Settlement
  - Capital of: Vershino-Tyoysky Possovet Urban Settlement
- Time zone: UTC+7 (MSK+4)
- Postal code: 655731
- OKTMO ID: 95608169051

Vershina Tyoi (Russian: Вершина Тёи; Khakas: Tӧӧ пазы, Töö Pazı) is an urban-type settlement in Askizsky District of the Republic of Khakassia, Russia. Population: 3,756 (2010 census); 4,482 (2002 census); 5,565 (1989 Soviet census).
