= Krasnogorsk, Russia =

Krasnogorsk (Russian: Красногорск) is the name of several inhabited localities in Russia.

Urban localities

- Krasnogorsk, Moscow Oblast, a city in Krasnogorsky District of Moscow Oblast

Rural localities

- Krasnogorsk, Sakhalin Oblast, a selo in Tomarinsky District of Sakhalin Oblast
