= Yevgeniya Shapovalova =

Russian cross-country skier

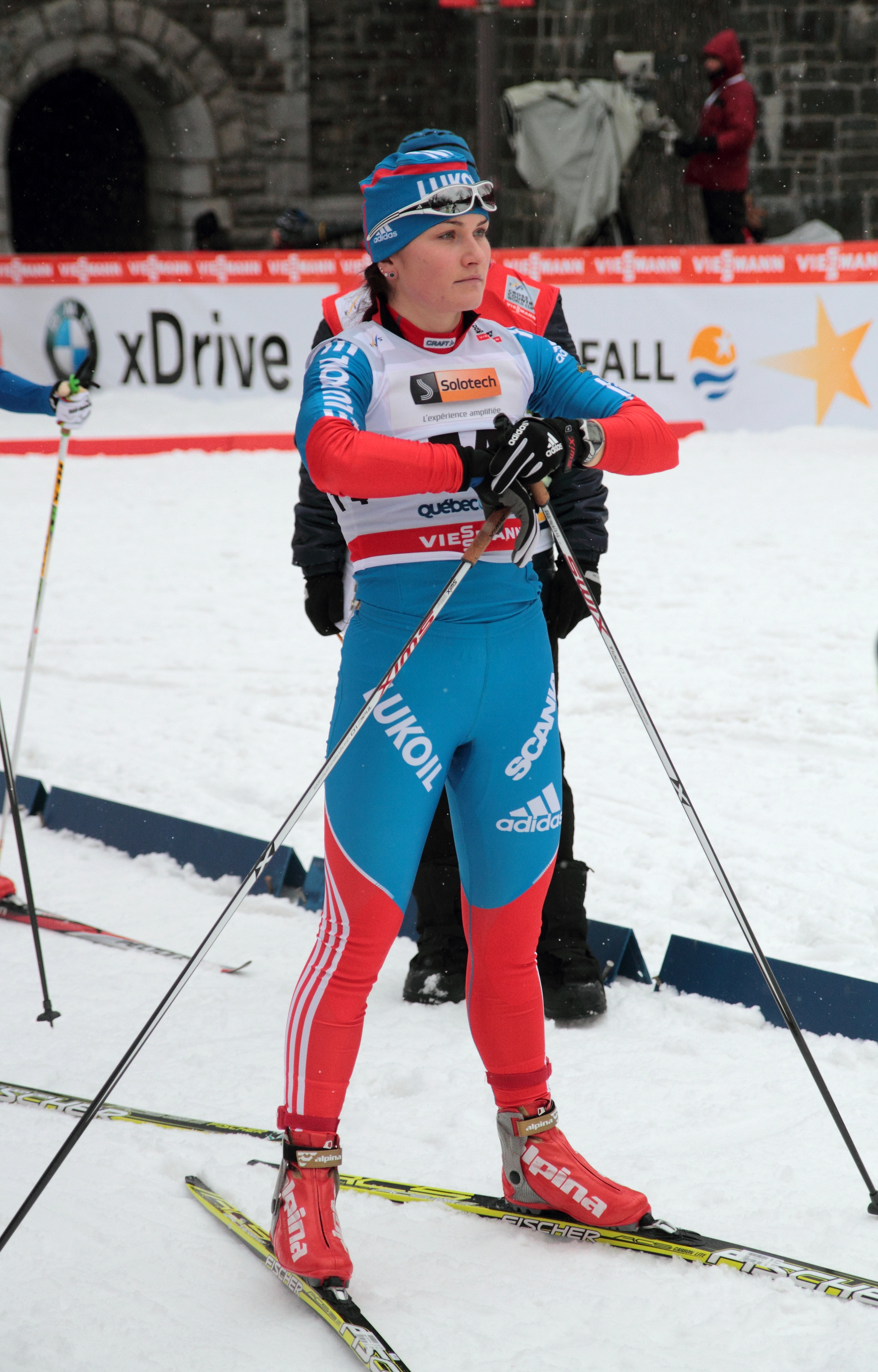
- Shapovalova in 2012

Personal information
- Full name: Yevgeniya Anatolyevna Shapovalova
- Nationality: Russia
- Born: 15 June 1986 (age 40) Nizhny Tagil, Soviet Union

Sport
- Sport: Skiing

World Cup career
- Seasons: 13 – (2007–2010, 2012–2020)
- Indiv. starts: 107
- Indiv. podiums: 3
- Indiv. wins: 1
- Team starts: 17
- Team podiums: 2
- Team wins: 0
- Overall titles: 0 – (23rd in 2007)
- Discipline titles: 0
- Updated on 28 March 2020

Yevgeniya Anatolyevna Shapovalova (Russian: Евгения Анатольевна Шаповалова; born 15 June 1986 in Nizhny Tagil) is a Russian cross-country skier who has been competing since 2006.

== Career ==
At the 2010 Winter Olympics, she finished 28th in the individual sprint event.

At the FIS Nordic World Ski Championships 2007 in Sapporo, Shapovalova finished 12th in the team sprint and 19th in the individual sprint events.

Her lone World Cup victory was in a sprint event in China in 2007.

In December 2016, FIS provisionally suspended six Russian cross-country skiers linked to doping violations during the 2014 Winter Olympics, including Yevgeniya Shapovalova. She was officially disqualified from the 2014 Winter Olympics by the International Olympic Committee on 9 November 2017. In January 2018, she successfully appealed against the lifetime ban as well as decision to disqualify her from Sochi Olympics at the Court of Arbitration for Sport.

== Cross-country skiing results ==
All results are sourced from the International Ski Federation (FIS).

=== Olympic Games ===
Year	Age	10 km individual	15 km skiathlon	30 km mass start	Sprint	4 × 5 km relay	Team sprint
2014	27	—	—	—	27	—	—

=== World Championships ===
Year	Age	10 km individual	15 km skiathlon	30 km mass start	Sprint	4 × 5 km relay	Team sprint
2007	20	—	—	—	19	—	12
2009	22	—	—	—	—	—	DSQ
2013	26	—	—	—	27	—	—
2015	28	—	—	—	21	—	—

=== World Cup ===
==== Season standings ====
Season	Age	Discipline standings			Ski Tour standings				
Season	Age	Overall	Distance	Sprint	Nordic Opening	Tour de Ski	Ski Tour 2020	World Cup Final	Ski Tour Canada
2007	20	23	61	9	—N/a	—	—N/a	—N/a	—N/a
2008	21	40	NC	25	—N/a	—	—N/a	—	—N/a
2009	22	48	NC	28	—N/a	—	—N/a	—	—N/a
2010	23	53	—	22	—N/a	—	—N/a	—	—N/a
2012	25	63	65	44	—	—	—N/a	—	—N/a
2013	26	41	87	16	DNF	—	—N/a	41	—N/a
2014	27	51	77	24	DNF	—	—N/a	—	—N/a
2015	28	42	44	22	—	29	—N/a	—N/a	—N/a
2016	29	48	74	30	35	—	—N/a	—N/a	—
2017	30	76	—	45	—	—	—N/a	—	—N/a
2018	31	78	NC	49	54	—	—N/a	—	—N/a
2019	32	74	NC	37	51	—	—N/a	—	—N/a
2020	33	91	—	63	—	—	—	—N/a	—N/a

==== Individual podiums ====
- 1 victory – (1 WC)
- 3 podiums – (2 WC, 1 SWC)

No.	Season	Date	Location	Race	Level	Place
1	2006–07	28 January 2007	Otepää, Estonia	1.0 km Sprint C	World Cup	3rd
2	2006–07	15 February 2007	Changchun, China	1.1 km Sprint C	World Cup	1st
3	2012–13	30 November 2012	Rukatunturi, Finland	1.4 km Sprint C	Stage World Cup	2nd

==== Team podiums ====
- 2 podiums – (2 TS)

No.	Season	Date	Location	Race	Level	Place	Teammate
1	2007–08	17 February 2008	Liberec, Czech Republic	4 × 1.4 km Team Sprint C	World Cup	3rd	Matveyeva
2	2013–14	12 January 2014	Nové Město, Czech Republic	6 × 1.3 km Team Sprint C	World Cup	2nd	Ivanova
