= Andrey Parfenov =

Russian cross-country skier

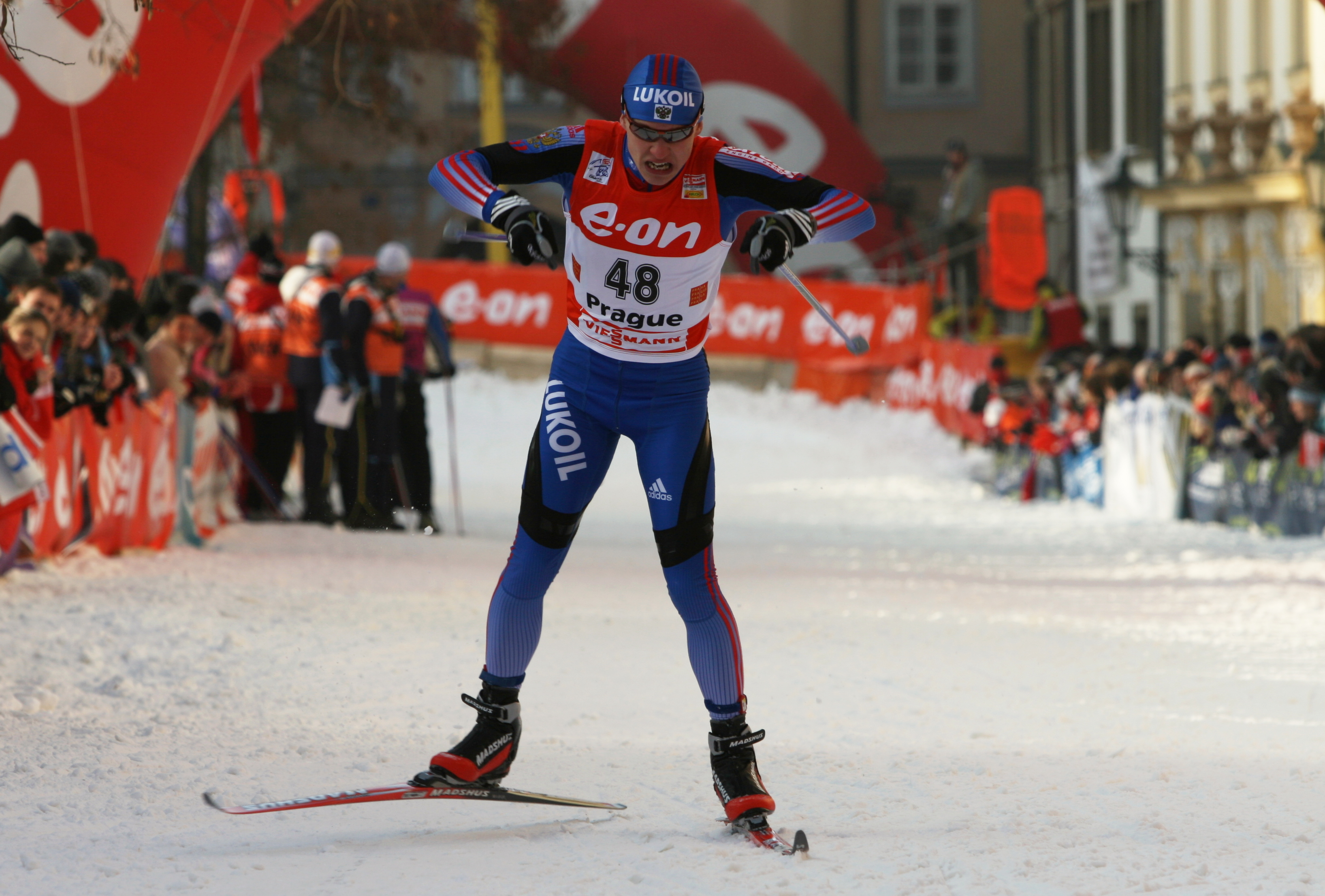
- Andrey Parfenov competing in Prague in 2007

Personal information
- Nationality: Russia
- Born: 17 December 1987 (age 38) Troitsko-Pechorsk, Russia

Sport
- Sport: Skiing

World Cup career
- Seasons: 10 – (2008–2013, 2015–2018)
- Indiv. starts: 57
- Indiv. podiums: 2
- Indiv. wins: 0
- Team starts: 9
- Team podiums: 1
- Team wins: 1
- Overall titles: 0 – (63rd in 2009)
- Discipline titles: 0
Medal record
Men's cross-country skiing
Representing Russia
U23 World Championships
Bronze medal – third place	2010 Hinterzarten	Individual sprint
Junior World Championships
Silver medal – second place	2006 Kranj	4 × 5 km relay
Silver medal – second place	2007 Tarvisio	4 × 5 km relay
- Updated on 24 April 2019

Andrey Parfenov (born 17 December 1987) is a Russian cross-country skier who competes internationally with the Russian national team.

He made his World Cup debut in 2007, and competed at the FIS Nordic World Ski Championships 2015.

== Cross-country skiing results ==
All results are sourced from the International Ski Federation (FIS).

=== World Championships ===
Year	Age	15 km individual	30 km skiathlon	50 km mass start	Sprint	4 × 10 km relay	Team sprint
2009	21	—	—	—	—	—	4
2015	27	—	—	—	31	—	—

=== World Cup ===
==== Season standings ====
Season	Age	Discipline standings			Ski Tour standings			
Season	Age	Overall	Distance	Sprint	Nordic Opening	Tour de Ski	World Cup Final	Ski Tour Canada
2008	20	99	NC	63	—N/a	43	49	—N/a
2009	21	63	88	30	—N/a	—	—	—N/a
2010	22	79	—	38	—N/a	—	—	—N/a
2011	23	96	NC	53	—	—	—	—N/a
2012	24	NC	—	NC	—	—	—	—N/a
2013	25	120	—	70	—	—	—	—N/a
2015	27	68	—	27	—	—	—N/a	—N/a
2016	28	89	—	51	—	—	—N/a	—
2017	29	74	—	30	—	—	—	—N/a
2018	30	NC	—	NC	—	—	—	—N/a

==== Individual podiums ====
- 2 podiums – (2 WC)

No.	Season	Date	Location	Race	Level	Place
1	2014–15	24 January 2015	Rybinsk, Russia	1.3 km Sprint F	World Cup	3rd
2	2016–17	3 February 2017	Pyeongchang, South Korea	1.5 km Sprint C	World Cup	3rd

==== Team podiums ====
- 1 victory – (1 TS)
- 1 podiums – (1 TS)

No.	Season	Date	Location	Race	Level	Place	Teammate
1	2016–17	5 February 2017	Pyeongchang, South Korea	6 × 1.5 km Team Sprint F	World Cup	1st	Retivykh
