= Alexey Vitsenko =

Russian cross-country skier

Personal information
- Native name: Алексей Александрович Виценко
- Full name: Alexey Alexandrovich Vitsenko
- Born: 20 April 1990 (age 34); Udorsky District, Komi Republic, Russia

Sport
- Country: Russia
- Sport: Cross-country skiing

Alexey Alexandrovich Vitsenko (Russian: Алексей Александрович Виценко, born 20 April 1990) is a Russian cross-country skier who competes internationally.

He participated at the 2018 Winter Olympics.
