= 2022–23 in skiing =

This topic lists the snow ski sports for the 2022–23 season.

== Alpine skiing ==
=== Alpine Skiing World Championships ===
- January 19–25: World Junior Alpine Skiing Championships 2023 in (Austria) St Anton am Arlberg
  - Junior Downhill winners: (Slovenia) Rok Ažnoh (m) / (Switzerland) Stefanie Grob (f)
  - Junior Super-G winners: (Switzerland) Livio Hiltbrand (m) / (Albania) Lara Colturi (f)
  - Junior Giant Slalom winners: (France) Alban Elezi Cannaferina (m) / (Sweden) Hanna Aronsson Elfman (f)
  - Junior Slalom winners: (Italy) Corrado Barbera (m) / (Sweden) Hanna Aronsson Elfman (f)
  - Junior Team Alpine Combined winners: Italy (m) / Switzerland (f)
  - Junior Mixed Team Parallel winners: Sweden (Cornelia Öhlund, Emil Nyberg, Liza Backlund, & Lucas Kongsholm)
- February 6–19: FIS Alpine World Ski Championships 2023 in (France) Courchevel–Méribel
  - Downhill winners: (Switzerland) Marco Odermatt (m) / (Switzerland) Jasmine Flury (f)
  - Super-G winners: (Canada) James Crawford (m) / (Italy) Marta Bassino (f)
  - Giant Slalom winners: (Switzerland) Marco Odermatt (m) / (United States) Mikaela Shiffrin (f)
  - Slalom winners: (Norway) Henrik Kristoffersen (m) / (Canada) Laurence St-Germain (f)
  - Alpine Combined winners: (France) Alexis Pinturault (m) / (Italy) Federica Brignone (f)
  - Parallel winners: (Germany) Alexander Schmid (m) / (Norway) Maria Therese Tviberg (f)
  - Mixed Team Parallel winners: United States (Nina O'Brien, River Radamus, Paula Moltzan, & Tommy Ford)

=== Alpine Skiing World Cup ===
==== October 2022 ====
- October 22 & 23: World Cup #1 in (Austria) Sölden
  - The Women's Giant Slalom event was cancelled.
  - Men's Giant Slalom winner: (Switzerland) Marco Odermatt
- October 26–30: World Cup #2 in (Switzerland) Zermatt
  - The two Men's Downhill events are cancelled.

==== November 2022 ====
- November 2–6: World Cup #3 in (Italy) Breuil-Cervinia
  - The two Women's Downhill events are cancelled.
- November 12 & 13: World Cup #4 in (Austria) Lech–Zürs
  - Both Parallel events are cancelled.
- November 19 & 20: World Cup #5 in (Finland) Levi
  - Women's Slalom winner: (United States) Mikaela Shiffrin (2 times)
- November 22–27: World Cup #6 in (Canada) Lake Louise Ski Resort #1
  - One of the Men's Super-G events was cancelled.
  - Men's Downhill winner: (Norway) Aleksander Aamodt Kilde
  - Men's Super-G winner: (Switzerland) Marco Odermatt
- November 26 & 27: World Cup #7 in (United States) Killington Ski Resort
  - Women's Giant Slalom winner: (Switzerland) Lara Gut-Behrami
  - Women's Slalom winner: (Sweden) Anna Swenn-Larsson
- November 29 – December 4: World Cup #8 in (United States) Beaver Creek Resort
  - One of the Men's Downhill events was cancelled.
  - Men's Downhill & Super-G winner: (Norway) Aleksander Aamodt Kilde
- November 29 – December 4: World Cup #9 in (Canada) Lake Louise Ski Resort #2
  - Women's Downhill winner: (Italy) Sofia Goggia (2 times)
  - Women's Super-G winner: (Switzerland) Corinne Suter

==== December 2022 ====
- December 10 & 11: World Cup #10 in (France) Val-d'Isère
  - Men's Giant Slalom winner: (Switzerland) Marco Odermatt
  - Men's Slalom winner: (Norway) Lucas Braathen
- December 10 & 11: World Cup #11 in (Italy) Sestriere
  - Women's Giant Slalom winner: (Italy) Marta Bassino
  - Women's Slalom winner: (Switzerland) Wendy Holdener
- December 14–17: World Cup #12 in (Italy) Val Gardena
  - The Men's Super-G event was cancelled.
  - Men's Downhill winners: (Austria) Vincent Kriechmayr (#1) / (Norway) Aleksander Aamodt Kilde (#2)
- December 14–18: World Cup #13 in (Switzerland) St. Moritz
  - Women's Downhill winners: (Italy) Elena Curtoni (#1) / (Italy) Sofia Goggia (#2)
  - Women's Super-G winner: (United States) Mikaela Shiffrin
- December 18 & 19: World Cup #14 in (Italy) Alta Badia
  - Men's Giant Slalom winners: (Norway) Lucas Braathen (#1) / (Switzerland) Marco Odermatt (#2)
- December 22: World Cup #15 in (Italy) Madonna di Campiglio
  - Men's Slalom winner: (Switzerland) Daniel Yule
- December 26–29: World Cup #16 in (Italy) Bormio
  - Men's Downhill winner: (Austria) Vincent Kriechmayr
  - Men's Super-G winner: (Switzerland) Marco Odermatt
- December 27–29: World Cup #17 in (Austria) Semmering
  - Women's Giant Slalom & Slalom winner: (United States) Mikaela Shiffrin (3 times)

==== January 2023 ====
- January 4: World Cup #18 in (Germany) Garmisch-Partenkirchen #1
  - Men's Slalom winner: (Norway) Henrik Kristoffersen
- January 4 & 5: World Cup #19 in (Croatia) Zagreb
  - One of the Women's Slalom events was cancelled.
  - Women's Slalom winner: (United States) Mikaela Shiffrin
- January 7 & 8: World Cup #20 in (Switzerland) Adelboden
  - Men's Giant Slalom winner: (Switzerland) Marco Odermatt
  - Men's Slalom winner: (Norway) Lucas Braathen
- January 7 & 8: World Cup #21 in (Slovenia) Kranjska Gora #1
  - Women's Giant Slalom winners: (Canada) Valérie Grenier (#1) / (United States) Mikaela Shiffrin (#2)
- January 10: World Cup #22 in (Austria) Flachau
  - Women's Slalom winner: (Slovakia) Petra Vlhová
- January 10–15: World Cup #23 in (Switzerland) Wengen
  - Men's Super-G & Downhill winner: (Norway) Aleksander Aamodt Kilde
  - Men's Slalom winner: (Norway) Henrik Kristoffersen
- January 12–15: World Cup #24 in (Austria) St Anton am Arlberg
  - Women's Super-G winners: (Italy) Federica Brignone (#1) / (Switzerland) Lara Gut-Behrami (#2)
- January 17–22: World Cup #25 in (Austria) Kitzbühel
  - Men's Downhill winners: (Austria) Vincent Kriechmayr (#1) / (Norway) Aleksander Aamodt Kilde (#2)
  - Men's Slalom winner: (Switzerland) Daniel Yule
- January 18–22: World Cup #26 in (Italy) Cortina d'Ampezzo #1
  - Women's Downhill winners: (Italy) Sofia Goggia (#1) / (Slovenia) Ilka Štuhec (#2)
  - Women's Super-G winner: (Norway) Ragnhild Mowinckel
- January 24 & 25: World Cup #27 in (Austria) Schladming
  - Men's Giant Slalom winner: (Switzerland) Loïc Meillard
  - Men's Slalom winner: (France) Clément Noël
- January 24 & 25: World Cup #28 in (Italy) Kronplatz
  - Women's Giant Slalom winner: (United States) Mikaela Shiffrin (2 times)
- January 26–29: World Cup #29 in (Germany) Garmisch-Partenkirchen #2
  - The Men's Downhill event was cancelled.
- January 28 & 29: World Cup #30 in (Czech Republic) Špindlerův Mlýn
  - Women's Slalom winners: (United States) Mikaela Shiffrin (#1) / (Germany) Lena Dürr (#2)
- January 28 & 29: World Cup #31 in (Italy) Cortina d'Ampezzo #2
  - Men's Super-G winner: (Switzerland) Marco Odermatt (2 times)

==== February 2023 ====
- February 4: World Cup #32 in (France) Chamonix
  - Men's Slalom winner: (Switzerland) Ramon Zenhäusern
- February 23–26: World Cup #33 in (Switzerland) Crans-Montana
  - The Women's Super-G event was cancelled.
  - Women's Downhill winner: (Italy) Sofia Goggia
- February 25 & 26: World Cup #34 in (United States) Palisades Tahoe
  - Men's Giant Slalom winner: (Austria) Marco Schwarz
  - Men's Slalom winner: (Norway) Alexander Steen Olsen

==== March 2023 ====
- March 1–5: World Cup #35 in (United States) Aspen
  - One of the Men's Downhill events was cancelled.
  - Men's Downhill winner: (Norway) Aleksander Aamodt Kilde
  - Men's Super-G winner: (Switzerland) Marco Odermatt
- March 1–5: World Cup #36 in (Norway) Kvitfjell
  - Women's Super-G winners: (Austria) Cornelia Hütter (#1) / (Austria) Nina Ortlieb (#2)
  - Women's Downhill winner: (Norway) Kajsa Vickhoff Lie
- March 10 & 11: World Cup #37 in (Sweden) Åre ski resort
  - Women's Giant Slalom & Slalom winner: (United States) Mikaela Shiffrin
- March 11 & 12: World Cup #38 in (Slovenia) Kranjska Gora #2
  - Men's Giant Slalom winner: (Switzerland) Marco Odermatt (2 times)
- March 13–19: World Cup #39 (final) in (Andorra) Soldeu
  - Downhill winners: (Austria) Vincent Kriechmayr (m) / (Slovenia) Ilka Štuhec (f)
  - Super-G winners: (Switzerland) Marco Odermatt (m) / (Switzerland) Lara Gut-Behrami (f)
  - Giant Slalom winners: (Switzerland) Marco Odermatt (m) / (United States) Mikaela Shiffrin (f)
  - Slalom winners: (Switzerland) Ramon Zenhäusern (m) / (Slovakia) Petra Vlhová (f)
  - Team Parallel winners: Norway (Thea Louise Stjernesund, Rasmus Windingstad, Maria Therese Tviberg, & Timon Haugan)

=== Alpine Skiing European Cup ===
- November 28 & 29, 2022: EC #1 in (Austria) Mayrhofen (Women's only)
  - Giant Slalom winner: (France) Doriane Escané
  - Slalom winner: (Sweden) Moa Boström Müssener
- December 1 & 2, 2022: EC #2 in (Switzerland) Zinal (Women's only)
  - Super-G winners: (France) Karen Smadja-Clément (1st) / (Switzerland) Janine Schmitt (2nd)
- December 1 & 2, 2022: EC #3 in (Austria) Obergurgl (Men's only)
  - Giant Slalom winners: (Switzerland) Josua Mettler (1st) / (Belgium) Sam Maes (2nd)
- December 5 & 6, 2022: EC #4 in (Switzerland) Zinal (Women's only)
  - Giant Slalom winners: (Italy) Asja Zenere (1st) / (Germany) Jessica Hilzinger (2nd)
- December 6 & 7, 2022: EC #5 in (Italy) Santa Caterina di Valfurva (Men's only)
  - Super-G winners: (Switzerland) Josua Mettler (1st) / (Austria) Andreas Ploier (2nd)
- December 12 & 13, 2022: EC #6 in (Switzerland) Zinal (Men's only)
  - Giant Slalom winners: (Switzerland) Livio Simonet (2 times)
- December 13 & 14, 2022: EC #7 in (Italy) Ponte di Legno (Women's only)
  - Giant Slalom winners: (Italy) Asja Zenere (2 times)
- December 15, 2022: EC #8 in (Italy) Obereggen (Men's only)
  - Slalom winner: (France) Steven Amiez
- December 16, 2022: EC #9 in (Italy) Val di Fassa (Men's only)
  - Slalom winner: (Italy) Alex Vinatzer
- December 16 & 17, 2022: EC #10 in (Italy) Valle Aurina (Women's only)
  - Slalom winners: (United States) Paula Moltzan (1st) / (Switzerland) Nicole Good (2nd)
- December 19–22, 2022: EC #11 in (Switzerland) St. Moritz (Men's only)
  - Downhill winner: (Canada) Cameron Alexander (2 times)

=== Alpine Skiing North American Cup ===
- November 30 – December 3, 2022: NAC #1 in (United States) Copper Mountain (Women's only)
  - Giant Slalom winner: (Canada) Britt Richardson (2 times)
  - Slalom winners: (United States) Allie Resnick (1st) / (Canada) Kiki Alexander (2nd)
- December 5–10, 2022: NAC #2 in (United States) Copper Mountain
  - Men's Downhill winners: (United States) Sam Morse (1st) / (United States) Erik Arvidsson (2nd)
  - Women's Downhill winner: (United States) Tricia Mangan (2 times)
  - Men's Super-G winners: (United States) Kyle Negomir (2 times)
  - Women's Super-G winners: (Canada) Kiki Alexander (2 times)
- December 12–15, 2022: NAC #3 in (United States) Beaver Creek (Men's only)
  - Giant Slalom winners: (United States) Jacob Dilling (1st) / (United States) Cooper Cornelius (2nd)
  - Slalom winners: (United States) Jimmy Krupka (2nd) / (Canada) Justin Alkier (2nd)

=== Alpine Skiing South American Cup ===
- August 5–7, 2022: SAC #1 in (Argentina) Chapelco
  - Giant Slalom winners: (Chile) Nicolás Pirozzi (m) / (Albania) Lara Colturi (f)
- August 9–13, 2022: SAC #2 in (Argentina) Cerro Catedral
  - Giant Slalom winners: (Chile) Andres Figueroa (m) / (Albania) Lara Colturi (f)
  - Slalom #1 winners: (Chile) Andres Figueroa (m) / (Argentina) Francesca Baruzzi (f)
  - Slalom #2 winners: (Chile) Andres Figueroa (m) / (Albania) Lara Colturi (f)
- August 27, 2022: SAC #3 in (Chile) El Colorado
  - Giant Slalom winners: (Argentina) Delfin Van Ditmar (m) / (Albania) Lara Colturi (f)
- August 28, 2022: SAC #4 in (Chile) La Parva
  - Slalom winners: (Japan) Akira Sasaki (m) / (Albania) Lara Colturi (f)
- August 29 – September 2, 2022: SAC #5 in (Chile) La Parva
  - Downhill #1 winners: (Slovenia) Miha Hrobat (m) / (Austria) Vanessa Nußbaumer (f)
  - Downhill #2 winners: (Germany) Jacob Schramm (m) / (Austria) Sabrina Maier (f)
  - Super-G #1 winners: (France) Johan Clarey (m) / (United States) Tricia Mangan (f)
  - Super-G #2 winners: (France) Cyprien Sarrazin (m) / (United States) Tricia Mangan (f)
  - Alpine Combined winners: (Chile) Henrik von Appen (m) / (Albania) Lara Colturi (f)
- September 12–16, 2022: SAC #6 in (Argentina) Cerro Castor
  - Men's Giant Slalom winners: (Italy) Giovanni Borsotti (1st) / (Italy) Alex Vinatzer (2nd)
  - Women's Giant Slalom winners: (Sweden) Sara Hector (1st) / (Sweden) Hilma Lövblom (2nd)
  - Men's Slalom winners: (Spain) Juan del Campo (1st) / (Spain) Joaquim Salarich (2nd)
  - Women's Slalom winners: (Sweden) Hanna Aronsson Elfman (1st) / (France) Chiara Pogneaux (2nd)
- September 26 – October 1, 2022: SAC #7 in (Argentina) Corralco
  - Downhill #1 winners: (Chile) Henrik von Appen (m) / (Norway) Malin Sofie Sund (f)
  - Downhill #2 winners: (Chile) Henrik von Appen (m) / (Norway) Malin Sofie Sund (f)
  - Alpine Combined winners: (Argentina) Tiziano Gravier (m) / (Norway) Malin Sofie Sund (f)
  - Super-G winners: (Chile) Henrik von Appen (m) / (Norway) Malin Sofie Sund (f)
  - Here first two Alpine combined competitions are cancelled.

=== Alpine Skiing Australia/New Zealand Cup ===
- August 22–30, 2022: ANC #1 in (New Zealand) Coronet Peak
  - Slalom #1 winners: (United States) Isaiah Nelson (m) / (United States) Katie Hensien (f)
  - Slalom #2 winners: (United States) Benjamin Ritchie (m) / (United States) Zoe Zimmermann (f)
  - Super-G #1 winners: (New Zealand) Willis Feasey (m) / (Canada) Candace Crawford (f)
  - Super-G #2 winners: (New Zealand) Willis Feasey (m) / (Canada) Candace Crawford (f)
  - Giant Slalom #1 winners: (United States) Isaiah Nelson (m) / (Canada) Candace Crawford (f)
  - Giant Slalom #2 winners: (Slovakia) Andreas Žampa (m) / (New Zealand) Alice Robinson (f)

== Biathlon ==
=== IBU World & Continental Championships ===
- January 25–29: 2023 IBU Open European Championships in (Switzerland) Lenzerheide
  - Individual winners: (Norway) Endre Strømsheim (m) / (Germany) Lisa Maria Spark (f)
  - Pursuit winners: (Norway) Vebjørn Sørum (m) / (Germany) Selina Grotian (f)
  - Sprint winners: (Norway) Erlend Bjøntegaard (m) / (Ukraine) Anastasiya Merkushyna (f)
  - Single Mixed Relay winners: Norway (Juni Arnekleiv & Endre Strømsheim)
  - Mixed Relay winners: Norway (Maren Kirkeeide, Karoline Erdal, Erlend Bjøntegaard, & Vebjørn Sørum)
- February 8–19: Biathlon World Championships 2023 in (Germany) Oberhof
- March 4–12: Biathlon Junior World Championships 2023 in (Kazakhstan) Shchuchinsk

=== Biathlon World Cup ===
- November 29 – December 4, 2022: World Cup #1 in (Finland) Kontiolahti
  - Individual winners: (Sweden) Martin Ponsiluoma (m) / (Sweden) Hanna Öberg (f)
  - Pursuit winners: (Norway) Johannes Thingnes Bø (m) / (France) Julia Simon (f)
  - Sprint winners: (Norway) Johannes Thingnes Bø (m) / (Austria) Lisa Theresa Hauser (f)
  - Men's 4x7.5 km Relay winners: Norway (Vetle Sjåstad Christiansen, Sturla Holm Lægreid, Tarjei Bø, & Johannes Thingnes Bø)
  - Women's 4x6 km Relay winners: Sweden (Linn Persson, Anna Magnusson, Hanna Öberg, & Elvira Öberg)
- December 8–11, 2022: World Cup #2 in (Austria) Hochfilzen
  - Pursuit winners: (Norway) Johannes Thingnes Bø (m) / (France) Julia Simon (f)
  - Sprint winners: (Norway) Johannes Thingnes Bø (m) / (Germany) Denise Herrmann-Wick (f)
  - Men's 4x7.5 km Relay winners: Norway (Sturla Holm Lægreid, Filip Fjeld Andersen, Johannes Thingnes Bø, & Vetle Sjåstad Christiansen)
  - Women's 4x6 km Relay winners: France (Lou Jeanmonnot, Anaïs Chevalier-Bouchet, Chloé Chevalier, & Julia Simon)
- December 15–18, 2022: World Cup #3 in (France) Annecy
  - Pursuit winners: (Norway) Sturla Holm Lægreid (m) / (Sweden) Elvira Öberg (f)
  - Sprint winners: (Norway) Johannes Thingnes Bø (m) / (Sweden) Anna Magnusson (f)
  - Mass Start winners: (Norway) Johannes Dale (m) / (Austria) Lisa Theresa Hauser (f)
- January 5–8: World Cup #4 in (Slovenia) Pokljuka
  - Men's Pursuit & Sprint winner: (Norway) Johannes Thingnes Bø
  - Women's Pursuit & Sprint winner: (Sweden) Elvira Öberg
  - Single Mixed Relay winners: Norway (Vetle Sjåstad Christiansen & Ingrid Landmark Tandrevold
  - Mixed Relay winners: France (Fabien Claude, Quentin Fillon Maillet, Anaïs Chevalier-Bouchet, & Julia Simon)
- January 11–15: World Cup #5 in (Germany) Ruhpolding
  - Individual winners: (Norway) Johannes Thingnes Bø (m) / (Italy) Lisa Vittozzi (f)
  - Mass Start winners: (Norway) Johannes Thingnes Bø (m) / (France) Julia Simon (f)
  - Men's 4x7.5 km Relay winners: Norway (Sturla Holm Lægreid, Tarjei Bø, Vetle Sjåstad Christiansen, & Johannes Thingnes Bø)
  - Women's 4x6 km Relay winners: Norway (Karoline Offigstad Knotten, Ragnhild Femsteinevik, Marte Olsbu Røiseland, & Ingrid Landmark Tandrevold)
- January 19–22: World Cup #6 in (Italy) Antholz-Anterselva
  - Pursuit winners: (Norway) Johannes Thingnes Bø (m) / (Germany) Denise Herrmann-Wick (f)
  - Sprint winners: (Norway) Johannes Thingnes Bø (m) / (Italy) Dorothea Wierer (f)
  - Men's 4x7.5 km Relay winners: Norway (Sturla Holm Lægreid, Tarjei Bø, Johannes Thingnes Bø, & Vetle Sjåstad Christiansen)
  - Women's 4x6 km Relay winners: France (Lou Jeanmonnot, Anaïs Chevalier-Bouchet, Chloé Chevalier, & Julia Simon)
- March 2–5: World Cup #7 in (Czech Republic) Nové Město na Moravě
- March 9–12: World Cup #8 in (Sweden) Östersund
- March 16–19: World Cup #9 (final) in (Norway) Oslo Holmenkollen

=== IBU Cup ===
- November 24–27, 2022: IBU Cup #1 in (Norway) Sjusjøen
  - All events here were cancelled.
- November 30–December 3, 2022: IBU Cup #2 in (Sweden) Idre
  - Individual winners: (Norway) Endre Strömsheim (m) / (Germany) Janina Hettich-Walz (f)
  - Pursuit winners: (Norway) Martin Uldal (m) / (Norway) Marthe Krakstad Johansen (f)
  - Men's Sprint winner: (Norway) Endre Strömsheim (2 times)
  - Women's Sprint winners: (Norway) Marthe Krakstad Johansen (#1) / (Germany) Selina Grotian (#2)
- December 15–18, 2022: IBU Cup #3 in (Italy) Ridnaun-Val Ridanna
  - Pursuit winners: (Norway) Mats Överby (m) / (Norway) Maren Kirkeeide (f)
  - Sprint winners: (Norway) Endre Strömsheim (m) / (Italy) Federica Sanfilippo (f)
  - Mass Start 60 winners: (Norway) Martin Uldal (m) / (France) Gilonne Guigonnat (f)
- January 5–8: IBU Cup #4 in (Slovakia) Brezno-Osrblie
  - Sprint winners: (France) Eric Perrot (m) / (Italy) Eleonora Fauner (f)
  - Super Sprint Final winners: (France) Eric Perrot (m) / (Norway) Maren Kirkeeide (f)
  - Single Mixed Relay winners: Norway (Mats Ŏverby & Frida Dokken)
  - Mixed Relay winners: Norway (Isak Frey, Endre Strömsheim, Juni Arnekleiv, & Maren Kirkeeide)
- January 13–15: IBU Cup #5 in (Germany) Arber
  - Individual Short winners: (Norway) Sindre Fjellheim Jorde (m) / (Italy) Hannah Auchentaller (f)
  - Men's Sprint winners: (Norway) Sindre Fjellheim Jorde (#1) / (Norway) Vebjørn Sørum (#2)
  - Women's Sprint winners: (Germany) Hanna Kebinger (#1) / (France) Paula Botet (#2)
- February 2–4: IBU Cup #6 in (Austria) Obertilliach
- February 23–26: IBU Cup #7 in (Canada) Canmore #1
- March 1–4: IBU Cup #8 (final) in (Canada) Canmore #2

== Cross-country skiing ==
=== XC World Championships ===
- February 22 – March 5: FIS Nordic World Ski Championships 2023 in (Slovenia) Planica

=== XC Skiing World Cup ===
- November 25–27, 2022: World Cup #1 in (Finland) Rukatunturi
  - Individual Start Classic winners: (Norway) Johannes Høsflot Klæbo (m) / (Sweden) Ebba Andersson (f)
  - Pursuit Free winners: (Norway) Johannes Høsflot Klæbo (m) / (Sweden) Frida Karlsson (f)
  - Sprint Final Classic winners: (Norway) Johannes Høsflot Klæbo (m) / (Sweden) Emma Ribom (f)
- December 2–4, 2022: World Cup #2 in (Norway) Lillehammer
  - Individual Start Free winners: (Norway) Iver Tildheim Andersen (m) / (United States) Jessie Diggins (f)
  - Mass Start Classic winners: (Norway) Pål Golberg (m) / (Sweden) Frida Karlsson (f)
  - Sprint Final Free winners: (Norway) Johannes Høsflot Klæbo (m) / (Sweden) Emma Ribom (f)
- December 9–11, 2022: World Cup #3 in Beitostølen
  - Individual Start Classic winners: (Norway) Pål Golberg (m) / (Finland) Kerttu Niskanen (f)
  - Sprint Final Classic winners: (France) Richard Jouve (m) / (Switzerland) Nadine Fähndrich (f)
  - 4x5 km Relay Classic/Free winners: Norway (Lotta Udnes Weng, Mikael Gunnulfsen, Silje Theodorsen, & Simen Hegstad Krüger)
- December 17 & 18, 2022: World Cup #4 in (Switzerland) Davos
  - Individual Start Free winners: (Norway) Simen Hegstad Krüger (m) / (United States) Jessie Diggins (f)
  - Sprint Final Free winners: (Italy) Federico Pellegrino (m) / (Switzerland) Nadine Fähndrich (f)
- December 31, 2022 & January 1: World Cup #5 in (Switzerland) Val Müstair
  - Pursuit Classic winners: (Norway) Johannes Høsflot Klæbo (m) / (Norway) Tiril Udnes Weng (f)
  - Sprint Final Free winners: (Norway) Johannes Høsflot Klæbo (m) / (Switzerland) Nadine Fähndrich (f)
- January 3 & 4: World Cup #6 in (Germany) Oberstdorf
  - Men's Individual Start Classic & Pursuit Free winner: (Norway) Johannes Høsflot Klæbo
  - Women's Individual Start Classic & Pursuit Free winner: (Sweden) Frida Karlsson
- January 6–8: World Cup #7 in (Italy) Fiemme Valley
  - Mass Start Classic winners: (Norway) Johannes Høsflot Klæbo (m) / (Germany) Katharina Hennig (f)
  - Mass Start Free winners: (Norway) Simen Hegstad Krüger (m) / (France) Delphine Claudel (f)
  - Sprint Final Classic winners: (Norway) Johannes Høsflot Klæbo (m) / (Norway) Lotta Udnes Weng (f)
- January 21 & 22: Original World Cup #8 in (Italy) Milan
  - All events here are cancelled.
- January 21 & 22: Replaced World Cup #8 in (Italy) Livigno
  - Sprint Final Free winners: (Norway) Johannes Høsflot Klæbo (m) / (Sweden) Jonna Sundling (f)
  - Men's Team Sprint Free winners: France (Renaud Jay & Richard Jouve)
  - Women's Team Sprint Free winners: Sweden (Linn Svahn & Maja Dahlqvist)
- January 27–29: World Cup #9 in (France) Les Rousses
  - Individual Start Free winners: (Norway) Harald Østberg Amundsen (m) / (Sweden) Ebba Andersson (f)
  - Mass Start Classic winners: (Norway) Johannes Høsflot Klæbo (m) / (Sweden) Ebba Andersson (f)
  - Sprint Final Classic winners: (France) Richard Jouve (m) / (Norway) Kristine Stavås Skistad (f)
- February 3–5: World Cup #10 in (Italy) Toblach
  - Individual Start Free winners: (m) / (f)
  - Sprint Final Free winners: (m) / (f)
  - 4x7.5 km Relay Classic/Free winners:
- March 11 & 12: World Cup #11 in (Norway) Oslo
- March 14: World Cup #12 in (Norway) Drammen
- March 17–19: World Cup #13 in (Sweden) Falun
- March 21: World Cup #14 in (Estonia) Tallinn
- March 24–26: World Cup #15 (final) in (Finland) Lahti

=== 2022–23 FIS Cross-Country Continental Cup ===
==== Australia/New Zealand Cup ====
- July 30 & 31, 2022: ANC #1 in (Australia) Falls Creek Alpine Resort
  - Sprint Classic winners: (Australia) Lars Young Vik (m) / (Australia) Katerina Paul (f)
  - Men's 15 km Freestyle winner: (Australia) Phillip Bellingham
  - Women's 10 km Freestyle winner: (Australia) Zana Evans
- August 20 & 21, 2022: ANC #2 in (Australia) Perisher Ski Resort
  - Sprint Freestyle winners: (Australia) Lars Young Vik (m) / (Australia) Katerina Paul (f)
  - Men's 10 km Classic winner: (Australia) Seve de Campo
  - Women's 5 km Classic winner: (Australia) Phoebe Cridland

==== East European Cup ====
- November 13–15, 2022: EEC #1 in (Kazakhstan) Shchuchinsk
  - Sprint Classic winners: (Kazakhstan) Konstantin Bortsov (m) / (Kazakhstan) Anna Melnik (f)
  - Men's 10 km Individual Classic winner: (Kazakhstan) Vitaliy Pukhkalo
  - Women's 10 km Individual Classic winner: (Kazakhstan) Kseniya Shalygina
  - Men's 15 km Individual Free winner: (Kazakhstan) Vitaliy Pukhkalo
  - Women's 15 km Individual Free winner: (Kazakhstan) Kseniya Shalygina

==== North American Cup ====
- November 30 – December 4, 2022: NAC #1 in (Canada) Vernon
  - Sprint Classic winners: (Norway) Magnus Bøe (m) / (United States) Hailey Swirbul (f)
  - Mass Start winners: (France) Tom Mancini (m) / (Germany) Anna-Maria Dietze (f)
  - Sprint Freestyle winners: (Norway) Andreas Kirkeng (m) / (United States) Hailey Swirbul (f)
  - 10 km Classic winners: (Norway) Andreas Kirkeng (m) / (United States) Hailey Swirbul (f)

==== South American Cup ====
- September 2–4, 2022: SAC #1 in (Argentina) Cerro Catedral
  - Sprint Classic winners: (Argentina) Franco Dal Farra (m) / (Argentina) Maira Sofía Fernández Righi (f)
  - Men's 10 km Individual Classic winner: (Argentina) Franco Dal Farra
  - Women's 5 km Individual Classic winner: (Argentina) Agustina Groetzner
  - Men's 10 km Individual Free winner: (Argentina) Franco Dal Farra
  - Women's 5 km Individual Free winner: (Argentina) Nahiara Díaz
- September 21 & 22, 2022: #2 in (Chile) Corralco
  - Men's 10 km Individual Free winner: (Argentina) Franco Dal Farra
  - Women's 7.5 km Individual Free winner: (Argentina) María Cecilia Domínguez
  - Sprint Freestyle winners: (Argentina) Franco Dal Farra (m) / (Argentina) María Cecilia Domínguez (f)

== Freestyle skiing ==
=== Freestyle Skiing World Championships ===
- February 19 – March 4: FIS Freestyle Ski and Snowboarding World Championships 2023 in (Georgia (country)) Bakuriani
- March 20–26: 2023 FIS Junior Freestyle Moguls and Aerials World Ski Championship in (Switzerland) Airolo
- March 27 & 28: 2023 FIS Junior Freestyle Ski Cross World Ski Championship in (Italy) San Pellegrino Pass
- August 27 – September 8: 2023 FIS Junior Freeski World Championship in (New Zealand) Cardrona

=== Freeskiing World Cup ===
- October 21, 2022: FS World Cup #1 in (Switzerland) Chur
  - Big Air winners: (Norway) Birk Ruud (m) / (France) Tess Ledeux (f)
- November 18 & 19, 2022: FS World Cup #2 in (Austria) Stubai
  - Slopestyle winners: (Norway) Birk Ruud (m) / (Norway) Johanne Killi (f)
- November 24 & 25, 2022: FS World Cup #3 in (Sweden) Falun
  - Both Freeskiing Big Air events are cancelled.
- December 14–17, 2022: FS World Cup #4 in (United States) Copper Mountain
  - Big Air winners: (Norway) Birk Ruud (m) / (Canada) Megan Oldham (f)
  - Halfpipe winners: (United States) Birk Irving (m) / (Canada) Rachael Karker (f)
- January 12–14: FS World Cup #5 in (France) Font Romeu
  - Both Freeskiing Slopestyle events are cancelled.
- January 18–22: FS World Cup #6 in (Switzerland) Laax
  - Slopestyle winners: (Switzerland) Andri Ragettli (m) / (Norway) Johanne Killi (f)
- January 19–21: FS World Cup #7 in (Canada) Calgary
  - Men's Halfpipe winners: (Finland) Jon Sallinen (#1) / (United States) Alex Ferreira (#2)
  - Women's Halfpipe winner: (China) Eileen Gu (2 times)
- February 1–4: FS World Cup #8 in (United States) Mammoth Mountain
  - Halfpipe winners: (m) / (f)
  - Slopestyle winners: (m) / (f)
- March 9–11: FS World Cup #9 in (China) Secret Garden
  - Both Freeskiing Halfpipe events are cancelled.
- March 16–18: FS World Cup #10 in (France) Tignes
- March 23–25: FS World Cup #11 (final) in (Switzerland) Silvaplana

=== Moguls & Aerials World Cup ===
- December 3 & 4, 2022: MA World Cup #1 in (Finland) Rukatunturi
  - Aerials winners: (Switzerland) Pirmin Werner (m) / (Australia) Danielle Scott (f)
  - Moguls winners: (Canada) Mikaël Kingsbury (m) / (Australia) Jakara Anthony (f)
- December 10 & 11, 2022: MA World Cup #2 in (Sweden) Idre Fjäll
  - Moguls winners: (United States) Nick Page (m) / (Australia) Jakara Anthony (f)
  - Dual Moguls winners: (Canada) Mikaël Kingsbury (m) / (United States) Elizabeth Lemley (f)
- December 16 & 17, 2022: MA World Cup #3 in (France) Alpe d'Huez
  - Men's Moguls & Dual Moguls winner: (Japan) Ikuma Horishima
  - Women's Moguls winner: (Australia) Jakara Anthony
  - Women's Dual Moguls winner: (Japan) Anri Kawamura
- January 21 & 22: MA World Cup #4 in (Canada) Le Relais
  - Men's Aerials winners: (United States) Quinn Dehlinger (#1) / (Switzerland) Noé Roth (#2)
  - Women's Aerials winners: (Canada) Marion Thénault (#1) / (Australia) Laura Peel (#2)
- January 27 & 28: MA World Cup #5 in (Canada) Val Saint-Côme
  - Moguls winners: (Canada) Mikaël Kingsbury (m) / (Japan) Anri Kawamura (f)
  - Dual Moguls winners: (Sweden) Walter Wallberg (m) / (Japan) Anri Kawamura (f)
- February 2–4: MA World Cup #6 in (United States) Deer Valley
  - Aerials winners: (m) / (f)
  - Moguls winners: (m) / (f)
  - Dual Moguls winners: (m) / (f)
- February 11: MA World Cup #7 in (Italy) Chiesa in Valmalenco
  - Dual Moguls winners: (m) / (f)
- March 5: MA World Cup #8 in (Switzerland) Engadin
- March 17–20: MA World Cup #9 (final) in (Kazakhstan) Almaty

=== Ski cross World Cup ===
- November 4 & 5, 2022: SC World Cup #1 in (France) Les Deux Alpes
  - Both Ski Cross events were cancelled.
- December 7–9, 2022: SC World Cup #2 in (France) Val Thorens
  - Men's Ski Cross winners: (Austria) Johannes Rohrweck (#1) / (Austria) Mathias Graf (#2)
  - Women's Ski Cross winner: (Sweden) Sandra Näslund (2 times)
- December 11 & 12, 2022: SC World Cup #3 in (Switzerland) Arosa
  - Ski Cross winners: (France) Terence Tchiknavorian (m) / (Sweden) Sandra Näslund (f)
- December 20–22, 2022: SC World Cup #4 in (Italy) Innichen
  - Men's Ski Cross winners: (Austria) Mathias Graf (#1) / (Canada) Reece Howden (#2)
  - Women's Ski Cross winner: (Sweden) Sandra Näslund (2 times)
- December 27–29, 2022: SC World Cup #5 in (Italy) Alleghe
  - All Ski Cross events were cancelled.
- January 20–22: SC World Cup #6 in (Sweden) Idre Fjäll
  - Men's Ski Cross winners: (Sweden) David Mobärg (#1) / (Canada) Reece Howden (#2)
  - Women's Ski Cross winner: (Sweden) Sandra Näslund (2 times)
- January 27–29: SC World Cup #7 in (France) Megève
  - All Ski Cross events were cancelled.
- February 15–17: SC World Cup #8 in (Austria) Reiteralm
  - Men's Ski Cross winners: (#1) / (#2)
  - Women's Ski Cross winners: (#1) / (#2)
- March 3–5: SC World Cup #9 in (Germany) Oberwiesenthal
- March 10–12: SC World Cup #10 in (Switzerland) Veysonnaz
- March 17–19: SC World Cup #11 (final) in (Canada) Craigleith

=== European Cup ===
- November 20, 2022: EC #1 in (Austria) Pitztal
  - Ski Cross winners: (Austria) Mathias Graf (m) / (Germany) Daniela Maier (f)

=== Australia/New Zealand Cup ===
- August 1–5, 2022: ANC #1 in (Australia) Perisher Ski Resort
  - Freeski Slopestyle #1 winners: (Australia) Cameron Waddell (m) / (Australia) Mabel Ashburn (f)
  - Freeski Slopestyle #2 winners: (Australia) Bailey Johnson (m) / (Australia) Mabel Ashburn (f)
  - Freeski Big Air winners: (Australia) Cameron Waddell (m) / (Australia) Daisy Thomas (f)
- August 30 & 31, 2022: ANC #2 in (Australia) Perisher Ski Resort
  - Moguls #1 winners: (Australia) Matt Graham (m) / (Japan) Anri Kawamura (f)
  - Moguls #2 winners: (Australia) Matt Graham (m) / (Japan) Anri Kawamura (f)
  - August 31 – September 3, 2022: ANC #3 in (Australia) Mount Hotham
  - Ski Cross #1 winners: (Japan) Satoshi Furuno (m) / (Australia) Abby Evans (f)
  - Ski Cross #2 winners: (Japan) Satoshi Furuno (m) / (Japan) Lin Nakanishi (f)
  - Ski Cross #3 winners: (Australia) Douglas Crawford (m) / (Japan) Lin Nakanishi (f)
- September 1–4, 2022: ANC #3 in (New Zealand) Cardrona
  - Freeski Halfpipe winners: (New Zealand) Gustav Legnavsky (m) / (United States) Hanna Faulhaber (f)
  - Freeski Slopestyle winners: (New Zealand) Luca Harrington (m) / (New Zealand) Ruby Andrews (f)
- September 2 & 3, 2022: ANC #4 in (Australia) Mount Buller
  - Dual Moguls winners: (Australia) Matt Graham (m) / (Austria) Avital Carroll (f)
- October 1–8, 2022: ANC #4 in (New Zealand) Cardrona
  - Freeski Big Air winners: (New Zealand) Luca Harrington (m) / (Australia) Daisy Thomas (f)
  - Freeski Slopestyle winners: (New Zealand) Luca Harrington (m) / (Canada) Caoimhe Heavey (f)
  - Freeski Halfpipe winners: (New Zealand) Gustav Legnavsky (m) / (New Zealand) Sylvia Trotter (f)

=== Freestyle Skiing South American Cup ===
- August 4–7, 2022: SAC #1 in (Chile) La Parva
  - Freeski Slopestyle #1 winners: (Chile) Francisco Salas (m) / (Chile) Dominique Ohaco (f)
  - Freeski Slopestyle #2 winners: (Argentina) Cristóbal Colombo (m) / (Chile) Dominique Ohaco (f)
- August 8 & 9, 2022: SAC #2 in (Chile) El Colorado
  - Freeski Big Air #1 winners: (Chile) Francisco Salas (m) / (Chile) Dominique Ohaco (f)
  - Freeski Big Air #2 winners: (Chile) Francisco Salas (m) / No events
- August 10–12, 2022: SAC #3 in (Chile) La Parva
  - Cancelled.
- September 7–12, 2022: SAC #4 in (Argentina) Cerro Catedral
  - Men's Freeski Slopestyle winner: (Chile) Francisco Salas (2 times)
  - Women's Freeski Slopestyle winner: (Chile) Dominique Ohaco (2 times)
  - Men's Freeski Big Air winner: (Argentina) Cristóbal Colombo (2 times)
  - Here, Women's Freeski Big Air is cancelled.
- September 15–17, 2022: SAC #5 in (Chile) La Parva
  - Men's Ski Cross winners: (Chile) Valentin Signe (1st) / (Chile) Kay Holscher (2nd)
  - Women's Ski Cross winners: (Chile) Maria Jesus Bartel (2 times)
- September 19–23, 2022: SAC #7 in (Argentina) Chapelco
  - Men's Freeski Slopestyle winner: (Chile) Francisco Salas
  - Here, Women's Freeski Slopestyle and Freeski Big Air competitions are cancelled.

== Nordic combined ==
=== Nordic Combined World Championships ===
- January 27 – February 5: 2023 Nordic Junior World Ski Championships in (Canada) Whistler
- February 22 – March 5: FIS Nordic World Ski Championships 2023 in (Slovenia) Planica

=== NC World Cup ===
- November 24–27, 2022: World Cup #1 in (Finland) Rukatunturi
  - Men's Gundersen Large Hill winners: (Germany) Julian Schmid (#1) / (Norway) Jarl Magnus Riiber (#2)
  - Men's Mass Start Large Hill winner: (Norway) Jarl Magnus Riiber
- December 1–4, 2022: World Cup #2 in (Norway) Lillehammer
  - Men's Gundersen Large Hill winner: (Norway) Jarl Magnus Riiber
  - Men's Gundersen Normal Hill winner: (Norway) Jens Lurås Oftebro
  - Women's Gundersen Normal Hill winner: (Norway) Gyda Westvold Hansen (2 times)
- December 15–18, 2022: World Cup #3 in (Austria) Ramsau am Dachstein
  - Men's Gundersen Normal Hill winners: (Norway) Jarl Magnus Riiber (#1) / (Germany) Vinzenz Geiger (#2)
  - Women's Gundersen Normal Hill winner: (Norway) Gyda Westvold Hansen (2 times)
- January 5–8: World Cup #4 in (Estonia) Otepää
  - The Women's Mass Start event was cancelled.
  - Men's Gundersen Normal Hill winner: (Germany) Julian Schmid
  - Women's Gundersen Normal Hill winner: (Norway) Gyda Westvold Hansen
  - Men's Mass Start winner: (Austria) Johannes Lamparter
  - Team winners: Norway (Jens Lurås Oftebro, Ida Marie Hagen, Gyda Westvold Hansen, & Jørgen Graabak)
- January 19–22: World Cup #5 in (Germany) Klingenthal
  - Men's Gundersen & Mass Start Large Hill winner: (Austria) Johannes Lamparter
- January 20–22: World Cup #6 in (France) Chaux-Neuve
  - Both Men's Gundersen Large Hill events was cancelled.
- January 26–29: World Cup #7 in (Austria) Seefeld in Tirol
  - Men's Gundersen Normal Hill winners: (#1) / (#2) / (#3)
  - Women's Gundersen Normal Hill winners: (#1) / (#2)
- February 3–5: World Cup #8 in (Germany) Oberstdorf
- February 10–12: World Cup #9 in (Germany) Schonach im Schwarzwald
- March 8–12: World Cup #10 in (Norway) Oslo
- March 24–27: World Cup #11 (final) in (Finland) Lahti

=== 2022 FIS Nordic combined Grand Prix ===
- August 26–28, 2022: GP #1 in Oberwiesenthal
  - Winners: (Finland) Ilkka Herola (m) / (Slovenia) Ema Volavšek (f)
  - Team event winners: Germany I (Julian Schmid, Jenny Nowak, Nathalie Armbruster, Johannes Rydzek)
- August 30 & 31, 2022: GP #2 in (Germany) Oberstdorf
  - Winners: (Austria) Franz-Josef Rehrl (m) / (Norway) Gyda Westvold Hansen (f)
- September 2–4, 2022: GP #3 in (Austria) Tschagguns
  - Men's winners: (Norway) Jens Lurås Oftebro (1st) / (Finland) Eero Hirvonen (2nd)
  - Women's winners: (Germany) Nathalie Armbruster (1st) / (Norway) Gyda Westvold Hansen (2nd)

=== 2022–23 Alpen Cup ===
- August 8, 2022: OPA #1 in (Germany) Klingenthal (Women's only)
  - Winner: (Germany) Anne Häckel
- August 12 & 13, 2022: OPA #2 in (Germany) Bischofsgrün (Women's only)
  - Cancelled.
- September 9 & 10, 2022: OPA #3 in (Germany) Oberstdorf (Men's only)
  - Winner: (France) Marco Heinis (2 times)
- September 17 & 18, 2022: OPA #4 in (Germany) Schwäbisch Gmünd (Women's only)
  - Winners: (Germany) Magdalena Burger (1st) / (Germany) Thea Haeckel (2nd)
- September 24 & 25, 2022: OPA #5 in (Austria) Villach
  - Men's winner: (France) Marco Heinis (2 times)
  - Women's winner: (Germany) Anne Häckel (2 times)
- October 8 & 9, 2022: OPA #6 in (France) Gérardmer
  - Men's winner: (France) Marceau Liardon
  - Women's winner: (Austria) Katharina Gruber
  - Men's Team winners: Austria (Levi Hofmann, Moritz Krismayr, Kenji Grossegger)
  - Women's Team winners: Germany I (Mara-Jolie Schlossarek, Pia Loh, Fabienne Klumpp)

=== 2022–23 FIS Youth Cup ===
- September 2 & 3, 2022: YC1 & YC2 in (Austria) Tschagguns
  - YC1 #1 winners: (Slovenia) Lovro Serucnik Percl (m) / (Finland) Emilia Vidgren (f)
  - YC2 #1 winners: (Czech Republic) Jan John (m) / (Norway) Kjersti Græsli (f)
  - YC1 #2 winners: (Austria) Kenji Grossegger (m) / (Austria) Anna-Sophia Gredler (f)
  - YC2 #2 winners: (Czech Republic) Jan John (m) / (Norway) Ingrid Laate (f)

== Ski jumping ==
=== SJ World Championships ===
- February 22 – March 5: FIS Nordic World Ski Championships 2023 in (Slovenia) Planica

=== SJ World Cup ===
- November 4–6, 2022: World Cup #1 in (Poland) Wisła
  - Men's winner: (Poland) Dawid Kubacki (2 times)
  - Women's winners: (Norway) Silje Opseth (#1) / (Austria) Eva Pinkelnig (#2)
- November 25–27, 2022: World Cup #2 in (Finland) Rukatunturi
  - Men's winners: (Slovenia) Anže Lanišek (#1) / (Austria) Stefan Kraft (#2)
- December 2–4, 2022: World Cup #3 in (Norway) Lillehammer #1
  - Women's winners: (Germany) Katharina Althaus (#1) / (Norway) Silje Opseth (#2)
- December 8–11, 2022: World Cup #4 in (Germany) Titisee-Neustadt
  - Men's winners: (Slovenia) Anže Lanišek (#1) / (Poland) Dawid Kubacki (#2)
  - Women's winner: (Germany) Katharina Althaus
  - Mixed Team winners: Austria (Marita Kramer, Michael Hayböck, Eva Pinkelnig, & Stefan Kraft)
- December 16–18, 2022: World Cup #5 in (Switzerland) Engelberg
  - Men's winners: (Slovenia) Anže Lanišek (#1) / (Poland) Dawid Kubacki (#2)
- December 27–29, 2022: World Cup #6 in (Austria) Villach
  - Women's winner: (Austria) Eva Pinkelnig (2 times)
- December 28 & 29, 2022: World Cup #7 in (Germany) Oberstdorf
  - Men's winner: (Norway) Halvor Egner Granerud
- December 30, 2022 – January 1: World Cup #8 in (Slovenia) Ljubno ob Savinji
  - Women's winners: (Norway) Anna Odine Strøm (#1) / (Austria) Eva Pinkelnig (#2)
- December 31, 2022 & January 1: World Cup #9 in (Germany) Garmisch-Partenkirchen
  - Men's winner: (Norway) Halvor Egner Granerud
- January 3 & 4: World Cup #10 in (Austria) Innsbruck
  - Men's winner: (Poland) Dawid Kubacki
- January 5 & 6: World Cup #11 in (Austria) Bischofshofen
  - Men's winner: (Norway) Halvor Egner Granerud
- January 6–8: World Cup #12 in (Japan) Sapporo #1
  - Women's winners: (Germany) Katharina Althaus (#1) / (Norway) Silje Opseth (#2)
- January 12–15: World Cup #13 in (Japan) Zaō
  - Women's individual winners: (Canada) Alexandria Loutitt (#1) / (Austria) Eva Pinkelnig (#2)
  - Women's team winners: Austria (Chiara Kreuzer & Eva Pinkelnig)
- January 13–15: World Cup #14 in (Poland) Zakopane
  - Men's individual winner: (Norway) Halvor Egner Granerud
  - Men's team winners: Austria (Daniel Tschofenig, Michael Hayböck, Manuel Fettner, & Stefan Kraft)
- January 19–22: World Cup #15 in (Japan) Sapporo #2
  - Men's winners: (Japan) Ryōyū Kobayashi (#1; 2 times) / (Austria) Stefan Kraft (#2)
- January 27–29: World Cup #16 in (Austria) Kulm Mitterndorf
  - Men's winners: (#1) / (#2)
- January 27–29: World Cup #17 in (Germany) Hinterzarten
  - Women's winners: (#1) / (#2)
- February 2–5: World Cup #18 in (Germany) Willingen
- February 10 & 11: World Cup #19 in (Austria) Hinzenbach
- February 10–12: Original World Cup #20 in (United States) Iron Mountain
  - The two Men's Ski Jumping events were cancelled.
- February 10–12: Replaced World Cup #20 in (United States) Lake Placid
  - Men's individual winners: (#1) / (#2)
  - Men's team winners:
- February 17–19: World Cup #21 in (Romania) Râșnov
- March 10–12: World Cup #22 in (Norway) Oslo
- March 13–16: World Cup #23 in (Norway) Lillehammer #2
- March 15 & 16: World Cup #24 in (Norway) Trondheim
  - The individual Men's & Women's events were cancelled.
- March 17–19: World Cup #25 in (Norway) Vikersund
- March 23–26: World Cup #26 in (Finland) Lahti
- March 30 – April 2: World Cup #27 (final) in (Slovenia) Planica

=== 2022–23 FIS Ski Jumping Continental Cup ===
- September 3 & 4, 2022: CC #1 in (Norway) Lillehammer
  - Men's winners: (Norway) Sondre Ringen (2 times)
  - Women's winners: (Canada) Abigail Strate (2 times)
- September 17 & 18, 2022: CC #2 in (Austria) Stams (Men's only)
  - Winners: (Austria) Michael Hayböck (1st) / (Poland) Aleksander Zniszczoł (2nd)
- September 24 & 25, 2022: CC #3 in (Germany) Klingenthal (Men's only)
  - Winners: (Norway) Sondre Ringen (1st) / (Austria) Michael Hayböck (2nd)
- October 7–9, 2022: CC #4 in (United States) Lake Placid
  - Men's winner: (Austria) Michael Hayböck (3 times)
  - Women's winners: (Canada) Abigail Strate (3 times)

=== 2022 FIS Ski Jumping Grand Prix ===
Summer

- July 22–24, 2022: GP #1 in (Poland) Wisła
  - Men's winners: (Poland) Dawid Kubacki (1st) / (Poland) Kamil Stoch (2nd)
  - Women's winners: (Slovenia) Urša Bogataj (1st) / (Slovenia) Nika Križnar (2nd)
- August 5–7, 2022: GP #2 in (France) Courchevel
  - Winners: (Austria) Manuel Fettner (m) / (Slovenia) Urša Bogataj (f)
- September 16–18, 2022: GP #3 in (Romania) Râșnov
  - Winners: (Japan) Ren Nikaido (m) / (Austria) Eva Pinkelnig (f)
  - Men's team winners: Austria (Daniel Tschofenig & Manuel Fettner)
  - Mixed team winners: Austria (Julia Mühlbacher, Jan Hörl, Eva Pinkelnig, Daniel Tschofenig)
- September 24 & 25, 2022: GP #4 in (Austria) Hinzenbach (Men's only)
  - Winner: (Poland) Dawid Kubacki
- September 30 – October 2, 2022: GP #5 in (Germany) Klingenthal
  - Winners: (Poland) Dawid Kubacki (m) / (Slovenia) Urša Bogataj (f)
  - Mixed team winners: Norway (Silje Opseth, Marius Lindvik, Thea Minyan Bjørseth, Daniel-André Tande)

=== 2022–23 Alpen Cup ===
- August 7 & 8, 2022: OPA #1 in (Germany) Klingenthal (Women's only)
  - Winner: (France) Lilou Zepchi (2 times)
- August 10 & 11, 2022: OPA #2 in (Germany) Pöhla (Women's only)
  - Winner: (France) Lilou Zepchi (2 times)
- August 12 & 13, 2022: OPA #3 in (Germany) Bischofsgrün (Women's only)
  - Winner: (Slovenia) Ajda Košnjek
- September 10 & 11, 2022: OPA #4 in (Germany) Oberstdorf (Men's only)
  - Winner: (Slovenia) Maksim Bartolj (2 times)
- September 17 & 18, 2022: OPA #5 in (Germany) Schwäbisch Gmünd (Women's only)
  - Winner: (Slovenia) Taja Bodlaj (2 times)
- September 24 & 25, 2022: OPA #5 in (Czech Republic) Liberec (Men's only)
  - Winner: (Slovenia) Rok Masle (2 times)
- October 8 & 9, 2022: OPA #6 in (France) Gérardmer
  - Men's winner: (Slovenia) Alexei Urevc
  - Women's winner: (Slovenia) Tina Erzar
  - Men's Team winners: Slovenia I (Kai Zakelšek, Blaž Jurčić, Alexei Urevc)
  - Women's Team winners: Slovenia II (Ula Vodlan, Živa Andrić, Tina Erzar)

=== 2022–23 FIS Cup ===
Summer

- July 30 & 31, 2022: FC #1 in (Estonia) Otepää
  - Cancelled due to organizational problems.
- August 12 & 13, 2022: FC #2 in (Czech Republic) Frenštát pod Radhoštěm (Men's only)
  - Winners: (Germany) Eric Fuchs (1st) / (Austria) Janni Reisenauer (2nd)
- August 20 & 21, 2022: FC #3 in (Poland) Szczyrk
  - Men's winners: (Austria) Niklas Bachlinger (1st) / (Austria) Maximilian Lienher (2nd)
  - Women's winners: (Austria) Hannah Wiegele (1st) / (Slovenia) Ajda Košnjek (2nd)
- August 26–28, 2022: FC #4 in (Switzerland) Einsiedeln
  - Men's winners: (Austria) Marco Wörgötter (1st) / (Austria) Jonas Schuster (2nd)
  - Women's winner: (Poland) Nicole Konderla (2 times)
- September 2 & 3, 2022: FC #5 in (Slovenia) Kranj
  - Men's winners: (Slovenia) Anže Lanišek (1st) / (Austria) Janni Reisenauer (2nd)
  - Women's winners: (Slovenia) Nika Križnar (1st) / (Slovenia) Nika Prevc (2nd)
- September 10 & 11, 2022: OPA #6 in (Austria) Villach
  - Men's winners: (Poland) Tomasz Pilch (1st) / (Italy) Francesco Cecon (2nd)
  - Women's winners: (Slovenia) Nika Prevc (1st) / (Austria) Hannah Wiegele (2nd)

== Ski mountaineering ==
=== ISMF World Championships ===
- February 26 – March 4: 2023 World Championship of Ski Mountaineering in (Spain) Boí Taüll Resort
- March 25: 2023 ISMF Long Distance Team World Championships in (Italy) Ponte di Legno–Tonale

=== 2022–23 ISMF World Cup Ski Mountaineering ===
- November 25–27, 2022: World Cup #1 in Val Thorens
  - Sprint Race winners: (Switzerland) Arno Lietha (m) / (France) Emily Harrop (f)
  - Women's U23 Sprint Race winner: (France) Emily Harrop
  - Mixed Relay Race winners: France (Emily Harrop & Thibault Anselmet)
- December 16–18, 2022: World Cup #2 in (Italy) Ponte di Legno-Tonale
  - Individual winners: (Switzerland) Rémi Bonnet (m) / (France) Axelle Mollaret (f)
  - Sprint Race winners: (Switzerland) Arno Lietha (m) / (France) Celia Perillat-Pessey (f)
- January 21 & 22: World Cup #3 in (Andorra) Arinsal–La Massana
  - Individual winners: (France) Thibault Anselmet (m) / (France) Axelle Mollaret (f)
  - Vertical winners: (Switzerland) Rémi Bonnet (m) / (France) Axelle Mollaret (f)
- February 7–10: World Cup #4 in (Switzerland) Morgins
- February 16: World Cup #5 in (Italy) Val Martello
- March 18: World Cup #6 in (Austria) Schladming
- April 11: World Cup #7 (final) in (Norway) Tromsø

== Snowboarding ==
=== Snowboarding World Championships ===
- February 19 – March 4: FIS Freestyle Ski and Snowboarding World Championships 2023 in (Georgia (country)) Bakuriani
- March 24–27: 2023 FIS Snowboard Alpine Junior World Championship in (Bulgaria) Bansko
- March 30 & 31: 2023 FIS Snowboard Cross Junior World Championship in (Italy) San Pellegrino Pass
- August 28 – September 8: 2023 FIS Snowboard Park & Pipe Junior World Championship in (New Zealand) Cardrona

=== Alpine snowboarding ===
- December 10 & 11, 2022: AS World Cup #1 in (Germany) Winterberg
  - Parallel Slalom winners: (Austria) Alexander Payer (m) / (Austria) Sabine Schöffmann (f)
  - Team Parallel Slalom winners: Switzerland (Gian Casanova & Ladina Jenny)
- December 15, 2022: AS World Cup #2 in (Italy) Carezza Dolomites
  - Parallel Giant Slalom winners: (Austria) Andreas Prommegger (m) / (Netherlands) Michelle Dekker (f)
- December 17, 2022: AS World Cup #3 in (Italy) Cortina d'Ampezzo
  - Parallel Giant Slalom winners: (Italy) Roland Fischnaller (m) / (Slovenia) Gloria Kotnik (f)
- January 10 & 11: AS World Cup #4 in Bad Gastein
  - Parallel Slalom winners: (Italy) Maurizio Bormolini (m) / (Austria) Daniela Ulbing (f)
  - Team Parallel Slalom winners: Austria (Andreas Prommegger & Daniela Ulbing)
- January 14: AS World Cup #5 in (Switzerland) Scuol
  - Parallel Giant Slalom winners: (Poland) Oskar Kwiatkowski (m) / (Germany) Carolin Langenhorst (f)
- January 21 & 22: AS World Cup #6 in (Bulgaria) Bansko
  - Men's parallel Slalom winners: (Switzerland) Dario Caviezel (#1) / (Italy) Maurizio Bormolini (#2)
  - Women's parallel Slalom winner: (Switzerland) Julie Zogg (2 times)
- January 26 & 27: AS World Cup #7 in (Canada) Blue Mountain
  - Men's parallel Giant Slalom winners: (#1) / (#2)
  - Women's parallel Giant Slalom winners: (#1) / (#2)
- March 11 & 12: Original AS World Cup #8 in (Italy) Piancavallo
  - All Parallel Slalom events were cancelled.
- March 11 & 12: Replaced AS World Cup #8 in (Italy) Livigno
  - Parallel Giant Slalom winners: (m) / (f)
  - Parallel Slalom winners: (m) / (f)
- March 15: AS World Cup #9 in (Slovenia) Rogla Ski Resort
- March 18 & 19: AS World Cup #10 (final) in (Germany) Berchtesgaden

=== Half-pipe, Big air, & Slopestyle World Cup ===
- October 22, 2022: HBS World Cup #1 in (Switzerland) Chur
  - Big Air winners: (Japan) Takeru Otsuka (m) / (Japan) Reira Iwabuchi (f)
- November 24–26, 2022: HBS World Cup #2 in (Sweden) Falun
  - Both Big Air events are cancelled.
- December 9 & 10, 2022: HBS World Cup #3 in (Canada) Edmonton
  - Big Air winners: (Australia) Valentino Guseli (m) / (Canada) Jasmine Baird (f)
- December 14–17, 2022: HBS World Cup #4 in (United States) Copper Mountain
  - Big Air winners: (Norway) Marcus Kleveland (m) / (Japan) Mari Fukada (f)
  - Halfpipe winners: (Australia) Scotty James (m) / (Spain) Queralt Castellet (f)
- January 13 & 14: HBS World Cup #5 in (Austria) Kreischberg
  - Big Air winners: (Japan) Taiga Hasegawa (m) / (Austria) Anna Gasser (f)
- January 18–21: HBS World Cup #6 in (Switzerland) Laax
  - Both Halfpipe events are cancelled.
  - Slopestyle winners: (Norway) Marcus Kleveland (m) / (New Zealand) Zoi Sadowski-Synnott (f)
- February 1–4: HBS World Cup #7 in (United States) Mammoth Mountain Ski Area
- February 9–12: HBS World Cup #8 in (Canada) Calgary
- March 10–12: HBS World Cup #9 in (China) Secret Garden
  - Both Halfpipe events are cancelled.
- March 24–26: HBS World Cup #10 (final) in (Switzerland) Silvaplana

=== Snowboard cross World Cup ===
- December 2–4, 2022: SC World Cup #1 in (France) Les Deux Alpes
  - Individual winners: (Germany) Martin Nörl (m) / (Australia) Josie Baff (f)
- December 15–17, 2022: SC World Cup #2 in (Italy) Breuil-Cervinia
  - Men's Individual winners: (Austria) Alessandro Hämmerle (#1) / (France) Loan Bozzolo (#2)
  - Women's Individual winners: (France) Chloé Trespeuch (#1) / (United Kingdom) Charlotte Bankes (#2)
- December 18–20, 2022: SC World Cup #3 in (Austria) Montafon
  - All Snowboard Cross events were cancelled.
- January 27 & 28: SC World Cup #4 in (Italy) Cortina d'Ampezzo
  - Individual winners: (m) / (f)
- February 3–5: SC World Cup #5 in (Canada) Mont-Sainte-Anne
- March 10–12: SC World Cup #6 in (Spain) Sierra Nevada Ski Station
- March 15 & 16: SC World Cup #7 (final) in (Switzerland) Veysonnaz

=== European Cup ===
- November 24, 2022: EC #1 in (Austria) Pitztal
  - Snowboard Cross winners: (Germany) Martin Nörl (m) / (Italy) Francesca Gallina (f)

=== Australia/New Zealand Cup ===
- August 1–5, 2022: ANC #1 in (Australia) Perisher Ski Resort
  - Slopestyle #1 winners: (Australia) Matthew Cox (m) / (United Kingdom) Mia Brookes (f)
  - Slopestyle #2 winners: (Australia) Valentino Guseli (m) / (United Kingdom) Mia Brookes (f)
  - Big Air winners: (Australia) Valentino Guseli (m) / (United Kingdom) Mia Brookes (f)
- September 1–4, 2022: ANC #2 in (New Zealand) Cardrona
  - Halfpipe winners: (South Korea) Lee Cha-eun (m) / (South Korea) Choi Ga-on
  - Slopestyle winners: (Australia) Jesse Parkinson (m) / (Japan) Mari Fukada (f)
- September 1–4, 2022: ANC #3 in (Australia) Mount Hotham
  - Snowboard Cross #1 winners: (Australia) Adam Lambert (m) / (Australia) Josie Baff (f)
  - Snowboard Cross #2 winners: (Australia) Adam Lambert (m) / (Australia) Josie Baff (f)
  - Snowboard Cross #3 winners: (Australia) Cameron Bolton (m) / (Australia) Josie Baff (f)
- October 1–8, 2022: ANC #4 in (New Zealand) Cardrona
  - Slopestyle winners: (Japan) Ryoma Kimata (m) / (New Zealand) Lucia Georgalli (f)
  - Halfpipe winners: (United States) Jason Wolle (m) / (Japan) Sara Shimizu (f)
  - Big Air winners: (Japan) Ryoma Kimata (m) / (Japan) Mari Fukada (f)

=== Snowboard South American Cup ===
- August 4–7, 2022: SAC #1 in (Chile) La Parva
  - Big Air #1 winners: (Argentina) Federico Chiaradio (m) / (Chile) Amanda Cardone (f)
  - Big Air #2 winners: (Argentina) Valentín Moreno (m) / No events
- August 8 & 9, 2022: SAC #2 in (Chile) El Colorado
  - Big Air #1 winners: (Argentina) Federico Chiaradio (m) / (Chile) Amanda Cardone (f)
  - Big Air #2 winners: (Argentina) Valentín Moreno (m) / No events
- August 10–12, 2022: SAC #3 in (Chile) La Parva
  - Cancelled.
- August 29 & 30, 2022: SAC #4 in (Chile) Corralco
  - Snowboard Cross #1 winners: (United States) Connor Schlegel (m) / (United States) Madeline Lochte-Bono (f)
  - Snowboard Cross #2 winners: (Brazil) Noah Bethonico (m) / (United States) Madeline Lochte-Bono (f)
- September 7–12, 2022: SAC #5 in (Argentina) Cerro Catedral
  - Men's Slopestyle winners: (Argentina) Federico Chiaradio (1st) / (Argentina) Manuel Fasola (2nd)
  - Men's Big Air winners: (Chile) Álvaro Yáñez (2 times)
  - Here, Women's Slopestyle and Big Air events are cancelled.
- September 15–17, 2022: SAC #6 in (Chile) La Parva
  - Men's Snowboard Cross winners: (Brazil) Noah Bethonico (2 times)
  - Here, Women's Snowboard Cross competitions are cancelled.
- September 19–23, 2022: SAC #7 in (Argentina) Chapelco
  - Men's Slopestyle winner: (Chile) Álvaro Yáñez
  - Here, Women's Slopestyle and Big Air events are cancelled.
