= 2022–23 FIS Cross-Country Continental Cup =

Discipline	Men	Women
Alpen Cup	(France) Julien Arnaud	(Germany) Helen Hoffman
Australia/New Zealand Cup	(Australia) Seve De Campo	(Australia) Katerina Paul
Balkan Cup	(Bulgaria) Daniel Peshkov	(Serbia) Anja Ilić
Eastern Europe Cup	(Kazakhstan) Denis Volotka	(Kazakhstan) Kseniya Shalygina
Far East Cup	(Japan) Takahiro Suzuki	(Japan) Chika Kobayashi
Slavic Cup	(Ukraine) Dmytro Drahun	(Poland) Daria Szkurat
Scandinavian Cup	(Norway) Harald Østberg Amundsen	(Sweden) Moa Lundgren
South America Cup	(Argentina) Franco Dal Farra	(Argentina) María Cecilia Domínguez

Competition

The 2022–23 FIS Cross-Country Continental Cup (COC) was a season of the FIS Cross-Country Continental Cup, a series of second-level cross-country skiing competitions arranged by the International Ski Federation (FIS).

The 2022–23 Continental Cup contained ten different series of geographically restricted competitions: five in Europe, two in North America, one in South America, Asia and Oceania.

On 1 March 2022, following the 2022 Russian invasion of Ukraine, FIS decided to exclude athletes from Russia and Belarus from FIS competitions, with an immediate effect.

== Winners ==
The overall winners from the 2021–22 season's Continental Cups are rewarded a right to start in the first period in the following 2023–24 World Cup season.

Cup	Abbr.	Men			Women		
Cup	Abbr.	Winner	Second	Third	Winner	Second	Third
Alpen Cup (or OPA Cup)	OPA	(France) Julien Arnaud	(Germany) Thomas Bing	(France) Rémi Bourdin	(Germany) Helen Hoffman	(Switzerland) Anja Weber	(Italy) Martina Bellini
Balkan Cup	BC	(Bulgaria) Daniel Peshkov	(Bulgaria) Todor Malchov	(Romania) Paul Constantin Pepene	(Serbia) Anja Ilić	(Croatia) Tena Hadžić	(North Macedonia) Ana Cvetanovska
Eastern Europe Cup	EEC	(Kazakhstan) Denis Volotka	(Kazakhstan) Kostantin Bortsov	(Kazakhstan) Vitaliy Pukhkalo	(Kazakhstan) Kseniya Shalygina	(Kazakhstan) Nadezhda Stepashkina	(Kazakhstan) Aisha Rakisheva
Far East Cup	FEC	(Japan) Takahiro Suzuki	(Japan) Chikara Ozeki	(Japan) Hyuga Otaki	(Japan) Chika Kobayashi	(Japan) Yuka Watanabe	(Japan) Harune Kamakura
Slavic Cup	SC	(Ukraine) Dmytro Drahun	(Slovakia) Andrej Renda	(Slovakia) Matej Horniak	(Poland) Daria Szkurat	(Poland) Andżelika Szyszka	(Slovakia) Barbora Klementová
Scandinavian Cup	SCAN	(Norway) Harald Østberg Amundsen	(Norway) Jan Thomas Jenssen	(Norway) Eirik Sverdrup Augdal	(Sweden) Moa Lundgren	(Norway) Tiril Liverud Knudsen	(Norway) Maren Wangensteen
South America Cup	SAC	(Argentina) Franco Dal Farra	(Argentina) Mateo Lorenzo Sauma	(Argentina) Nahuel Ezequiel Torres	(Argentina) María Cecilia Domínguez	(Argentina) Agustina Groetzner Rocco	(Argentina) Nahiara Díaz González
US Super Tour	UST						
Nor-Am Cup	NAC						
Australia/New Zealand Cup	ANC	(Australia) Seve De Campo	(Australia) Lars Young Vik	(Australia) Bentley Walker-Broose	(Australia) Katerina Paul	(Australia) Phoebe Cridland	(Australia) Zana Evans

== Results ==
=== Men ===
==== Alpen Cup ====
Key: C – Classic / F – Freestyle
Stage	Date	Place	Discipline	Winner	Second	Third
	2 December 2022	(Italy) Pragelato	Sprint F	cancelled, moved to Santa Caterina Valfurva		
	3 December 2022	(Italy) Pragelato	15 km F	cancelled, moved to Santa Caterina Valfurva		
	4 December 2022	(Italy) Pragelato	15 km C Mst	cancelled, moved to Santa Caterina Valfurva		
1	3 December 2022	(Italy) Santa Caterina Valfurva	Sprint F	(Italy) Simone Mocellini	(Italy) Mikael Abram	(Italy) Giacomo Gabrielli
2	4 December 2022	(Italy) Santa Caterina Valfurva	10 km C	(Italy) Dietmar Nöckler	(Sweden) Oskar Kardin	(Norway) Johan Hoel
3	17 December 2022	(Austria) Sankt Ulrich am Pillersee	Sprint C	(Czech Republic) Luděk Šeller	(Czech Republic) Ondřej Černý	(France) Julien Arnaud
4	18 December 2022	(Austria) Sankt Ulrich am Pillersee	20 km F	(Italy) Elia Barp	(Germany) Anian Sossau	(France) Sabin Coupat
	7 January 2023	(Germany) Zwiesel	Sprint C	cancelled, moved to Oberstdorf on the same dates		
	8 January 2023	(Germany) Zwiesel	20 km C Mst	cancelled, moved to Oberstdorf on the same dates		
5	7 January 2023	(Germany) Oberstdorf	Sprint C	(Italy) Simone Daprà	(Switzerland) Janik Riebli	(Germany) Jan Stölben
6	8 January 2023	(Germany) Oberstdorf	20 km C Mst	(Italy) Simone Daprà	(Germany) Jan-Friedrich Doerks	(Switzerland) Cédric Steiner
7	18 February 2023	(Switzerland) Campra	Sprint F	(Italy) Michael Hellweger	(Germany) Jan Stölben	(France) Arnaud Chautemps
8	19 February 2023	(Switzerland) Campra	20 km C Mst	(Germany) Thomas Bing	(Germany) Florian Notz	(France) Rémi Bourdin
9	4 March 2023	(France) Premanon	10 km F	(Germany) Florian Notz	(Italy) Lorenzo Romano	(Switzerland) Antonin Savary
10	5 March 2023	(France) Premanon	10 km C Mst	(Germany) Florian Notz	(Germany) Thomas Bing	(France) Rémi Bourdin
11	17 March 2023	(Italy) Dobbiaco	Sprint F	(Italy) Giacomo Gabrielli	(Switzerland) Erwan Käser	(Italy) Riccardo Bernardi
12	18 March 2023	(Italy) Dobbiaco	10 km F	(Switzerland) Antonin Savary	(Italy) Lorenzo Romano	(Italy) Giandomenico Salvadori
13	19 March 2023	(Italy) Dobbiaco	15 km C Pursuit	(Italy) Giandomenico Salvadori	(France) Julien Arnaud	(Italy) Luca Del Fabbro

==== Australia/New Zealand Cup ====
Key: C – Classic / F – Freestyle
Stage	Date	Place	Discipline	Winner	Second	Third
1	30 July 2022	(Australia) Falls Creek	Sprint C	(Australia) Lars Young Vik	(Australia) Phillip Bellingham	(Australia) Seve De Campo
2	31 July 2022	(Australia) Falls Creek	15 km F	(Australia) Phillip Bellingham	(Australia) Seve De Campo	(Australia) Lars Young Vik
3	20 August 2022	(Australia) Perisher	Sprint F	(Australia) Lars Young Vik	(Australia) Seve De Campo	(Australia) Fedele De Campo
4	21 August 2022	(Australia) Perisher	10 km C	(Australia) Seve De Campo	(United States) Peter Wolter	(Australia) Bentley Walker-Broose
5	27 August 2022	(Australia) Falls Creek	42 km F Marathon Mst	(United States) Peter Wolter	(New Zealand) Campbell Wright	(Australia) Lars Young Vik

==== Balkan Cup ====
Key: C – Classic / F – Freestyle
Stage	Date	Place	Discipline	Winner	Second	Third
	4 February 2023	(Greece) Pigadia	10 km F	cancelled		
	5 February 2023	(Greece) Pigadia	10 km F	cancelled		
1	8 February 2023	(North Macedonia) Mavrovo	10 km F	(Bulgaria) Daniel Peshkov	(Turkey) Yusuf Emre Fırat	(Bulgaria) Todor Malchov
2	9 February 2023	(North Macedonia) Mavrovo	10 km F	(Bulgaria) Daniel Peshkov	(Turkey) Yusuf Emre Fırat	(Turkey) Yusuf Talay
3	11 February 2023	(Croatia) Ravna Gora	Sprint F	(Bosnia and Herzegovina) Erić Strahinja	(Argentina) Franco Dal Farra	(Croatia) Marko Skender
4	12 February 2023	(Croatia) Ravna Gora	10 km C Mass Start	(Slovenia) Jošt Mulej	(Slovenia) Nejc Štern	(Slovenia) Boštjan Korošec
5	4 March 2023	(Bosnia and Herzegovina) Dvorišta-Pale	10 km F	(Romania) Paul Constantin Pepene	(Romania) Raul Mihai Popa	(Bosnia and Herzegovina) Erić Strahinja
6	5 March 2023	(Bosnia and Herzegovina) Dvorišta-Pale	10 km F	(Romania) Paul Constantin Pepene	(Romania) Raul Mihai Popa	(Bosnia and Herzegovina) Erić Strahinja
	7 March 2023	(Serbia) Zlatibor	10 km F	cancelled		
	8 March 2023	(Serbia) Zlatibor	10 km F	cancelled		
	11 March 2023	(Romania) Fundata	15 km F	cancelled		
	12 March 2023	(Romania) Fundata	10 km F	cancelled		
7	23 March 2023	(Turkey) Bolu-Gerede	10 km C	(Romania) Paul Constantin Pepene	(Bulgaria) Daniel Peshkov	(Bulgaria) Todor Malchov
8	24 March 2023	(Turkey) Bolu-Gerede	10 km F	(Romania) Paul Constantin Pepene	(Bulgaria) Daniel Peshkov	(Romania) Raul Mihai Popa

==== Eastern Europe Cup ====
Key: C – Classic / F – Freestyle
Stage	Date	Place	Discipline	Winner	Second	Third
1	13 November 2022	(Kazakhstan) Schuchinsk	Sprint C	(Kazakhstan) Kostantin Bortsov	(Kazakhstan) Denis Volotka	(Kazakhstan) Olzhas Klimin
2	14 November 2022	(Kazakhstan) Schuchinsk	10 km C	(Kazakhstan) Vitaliy Pukhkalo	(Kazakhstan) Nail Bashmakov	(Kazakhstan) Svyatoslav Matassov
3	15 November 2022	(Kazakhstan) Schuchinsk	15 km F	(Kazakhstan) Vitaliy Pukhkalo	(Kazakhstan) Nail Bashmakov	(Kazakhstan) Vladislav Kovalyov
4	21 December 2022	(Kazakhstan) Almaty Soldier Hollow	Sprint F	(Kazakhstan) Denis Volotka	(Kazakhstan) Kostantin Bortsov	(Kazakhstan) Vladislav Kovalyov
5	22 December 2022	(Kazakhstan) Almaty Soldier Hollow	10 km F	(Kazakhstan) Nikita Gridin	(Kazakhstan) Vladislav Kovalyov	(Kazakhstan) Yernur Bexultan
6	25 December 2022	(Kazakhstan) Almaty Soldier Hollow	20 km C Mst	(Kazakhstan) Denis Volotka	(Kazakhstan) Kostantin Bortsov	(Kazakhstan) Vladislav Kovalyov
7	21 March 2023	(Kazakhstan) Schuchinsk	Team Sprint C	(Kazakhstan) Kostantin Bortsov (Kazakhstan) Svyatoslav Matassov	(Kazakhstan) Didar Kassenov (Kazakhstan) Yernar Nursbekov	(Kazakhstan) Fedor Karpov (Kazakhstan) Olzhas Klimin
8	22 March 2023	(Kazakhstan) Schuchinsk	20 km C Skiathlon	(Kazakhstan) Vitaliy Pukhkalo	(Kazakhstan) Vladislav Kovalyov	(Kazakhstan) Fedor Karpov
9	24 March 2022	(Kazakhstan) Schuchinsk	Sprint F	(Kazakhstan) Denis Volotka	(Kazakhstan) Kostantin Bortsov	(Kazakhstan) Svyatoslav Matassov
10	25 March 2023	(Kazakhstan) Schuchinsk	10 km C	(Kazakhstan) Kostantin Bortsov	(Kazakhstan) Denis Volotka	(Kazakhstan) Vitaliy Pukhkalo
11	28 March 2023	(Kazakhstan) Schuchinsk	50 km F Mst	(Kazakhstan) Vitaliy Pukhkalo	(Kazakhstan) Fedor Karpov	(Kazakhstan) Nail Bashmakov

==== Far East Cup ====
Key: C – Classic / F – Freestyle
Stage	Date	Place	Discipline	Winner	Second	Third
1	17 December 2022	(South Korea) Pyeongchang	10 km C	(Japan) Chikara Ozeki	(Japan) Yoshiki Hoshino	(Japan) Shunsuke Koike (Japan) Takahiro Suzuki
2	18 December 2022	(South Korea) Pyeongchang	10 km F	(Japan) Takahiro Suzuki	(Japan) Kosei Kobayashi	(Japan) Daito Yamazaki
	26 December 2022	(Japan) Otoineppu	10 km C	cancelled		
	27 December 2022	(Japan) Otoineppu	10 km F	cancelled		
3	7 January 2023	(Japan) Sapporo	10 km C	(Japan) Ryo Hirose	(Japan) Takanori Ebina	(Japan) Hyuga Otaki
4	8 January 2023	(Japan) Sapporo	10 km F	(Japan) Haruki Yamashita	(Japan) Takatsugu Uda	(Japan) Masahuru Yamamoto
5	9 January 2023	(Japan) Sapporo	Sprint F	(Japan) Haruki Yamashita	(Japan) Tomoki Sato	(Japan) Shohei Kodama
6	3 February 2023	(South Korea) Pyeongchang	10 km C	(Japan) Chikara Ozeki	(South Korea) Jinbok Lee	(South Korea) Ji-Yeong Byun
7	4 February 2023	(South Korea) Pyeongchang	10 km F	(Japan) Takahiro Suzuki	(South Korea) Jinbok Lee	(Japan) Chikara Ozeki
8	11 February 2023	(Japan) Shiramine	15 km F	(Japan) Masato Tanaka	(Japan) Yuito Habuki	(Japan) Haruki Yamashita
9	12 February 2023	(Japan) Shiramine	Sprint C	(Japan) Moriguchi Shota	(Japan) Hyuga Otaki	(Japan) Chikara Ozeki
10	3 March 2023	(Japan) Sapporo	10 km C	(Japan) Hyuga Otaki	(Japan) Ikuya Takizawa	(Japan) Satoshi Kikuchi
11	4 March 2023	(Japan) Sapporo	15 km F	(Japan) Masato Tanaka	(Japan) Tomoki Sato	(Japan) Takahiro Suzuki

==== Slavic Cup ====
Key: C – Classic / F – Freestyle
Stage	Date	Place	Discipline	Winner	Second	Third
	28 December 2022	(Poland) Wisła-Kubalonka	Sprint C	cancelled, moved to Zakopane		
	29 December 2022	(Poland) Wisła-Kubalonka	15 km F	cancelled, moved to Zakopane		
1	29 December 2022	(Poland) Zakopane	10 km C	(Poland) Mateusz Haratyk	(Poland) Sebastian Bryja	(Poland) Piotr Jarecki
2	30 December 2022	(Poland) Zakopane	15 km F	(Poland) Sebastian Bryja	(Poland) Piotr Jarecki	(Poland) Mateusz Haratyk
3	14 January 2023	(Slovakia) Štrbské Pleso	Sprint C	(Ukraine) Dmytro Drahun	(Czech Republic) Vladimir Kozlovsky	(Poland) Piotr Sobiczewski
4	15 January 2023	(Slovakia) Štrbské Pleso	10 km F	(Czech Republic) Vladimir Kozlovsky	(Czech Republic) Ondřej Pilař	(Slovakia) Andrej Renda
5	25 February 2023	(Slovakia) Štrbské Pleso	15 km C	(Poland) Robert Bugara	(Poland) Paweł Bryja	(Poland) Jan Zwarzko
6	26 February 2023	(Slovakia) Štrbské Pleso	15 km F	(Poland) Robert Bugara	(Slovakia) Matej Horniak	(Poland) Kacper Kacper
7	11 March 2023	(Slovakia) Skalka pri Kremnici	Sprint F	(Ukraine) Dmytro Drahun	(Slovakia) Denis Tilesch	(Ukraine) Ruslan Denysenko
8	12 March 2023	(Slovakia) Skalka pri Kremnici	15 km C Mst	(Ukraine) Dmytro Drahun	(Ukraine) Ruslan Denysenko	(Slovakia) Andrej Renda
	18 March 2023	(Poland) Jakuszyce	10 km C	cancelled		
	19 March 2023	(Poland) Jakuszyce	20 km F Mst	cancelled		

==== Scandinavian Cup ====
Key: C – Classic / F – Freestyle
Stage	Date	Place	Discipline	Winner	Second	Third
1	16 December 2022	(Sweden) Östersund	Sprint C	(Norway) Lars Agnar Hjelmeset	(Norway) Sivert Wiig	(Norway) Håvard Moseby
	17 December 2022	(Sweden) Östersund	10 km C	cancelled		
2	18 December 2022	(Sweden) Östersund	20 km C Mst	(Norway) Jan Thomas Jenssen	(Norway) Harald Østberg Amundsen	(Norway) Håvard Moseby
	6 January 2023	(Finland) Rovaniemi	Sprint C	cancelled		
	7 January 2023	(Finland) Rovaniemi	10 km F	cancelled		
	8 January 2023	(Finland) Rovaniemi	20 km C	cancelled		
3	13 January 2023	(Sweden) Falun	10 km F	(Norway) Harald Østberg Amundsen	(Norway) Iver Tildheim Andersen	(Norway) Martin Kirkeberg Mørk
4	14 January 2023	(Sweden) Falun	Sprint C	(Norway) Erik Valnes	(Norway) Jan Thomas Jenssen	(Norway) Harald Østberg Amundsen
5	15 January 2023	(Sweden) Falun	30 km C Mass Start	(Norway) Jan Thomas Jenssen	(Norway) Jonas Vika	(Norway) Mikael Gunnulfsen
6	3 March 2023	(Latvia) Madona	Sprint F	(Norway) Sindre Bjørnestad Skar	(Norway) Harald Astrup Arnesen	(Norway) Harald Østberg Amundsen
7	4 March 2023	(Latvia) Madona	10 km F	(Norway) Harald Østberg Amundsen	(Norway) Iver Tildheim Andersen	(Norway) Eirik Sverdrup Augdal
8	5 March 2023	(Latvia) Madona	20 km C Pursuit	(Norway) Harald Østberg Amundsen	(Norway) Daniel Stock	(Norway) Håvard Moseby

==== South America Cup ====
Key: C – Classic / F – Freestyle
Stage	Date	Place	Discipline	Winner	Second	Third
1	2 September 2022	(Argentina) Cerro Catedral	Sprint C	(Argentina) Franco Dal Farra	(Argentina) Mateo Lorenzo Sauma	(Argentina) Nahuel Ezequiel Torres
2	3 September 2022	(Argentina) Cerro Catedral	10 km C	(Argentina) Franco Dal Farra	(Argentina) Nahuel Ezequiel Torres	(Argentina) Mateo Lorenzo Sauma
3	4 September 2022	(Argentina) Cerro Catedral	10 km F	(Argentina) Franco Dal Farra	(Argentina) Basilio Gabriel Fernandez	(Argentina) Mateo Lorenzo Sauma
4	21 September 2022	(Chile) Corralco	10 km F	(Argentina) Franco Dal Farra	(Chile) Yonathan Jesús Fernández García	(Argentina) Axel Nicolás Ciuffo
	21 September 2022	(Chile) Corralco	10 km F	cancelled		
5	22 September 2022	(Chile) Corralco	Sprint F	(Argentina) Franco Dal Farra	(Argentina) Mateo Lorenzo Sauma	(Chile) Yonathan Jesús Fernández García

==== US Super Tour ====
Key: C – Classic / F – Freestyle
Stage	Date	Place	Discipline	Winner	Second	Third
1	8 December 2022	(United States) Lake Creek	15 km C Mst	(United States) Finn O'Connell	(United States) Peter Wolter	(United States) Reid Goble
2	10 December 2022	(United States) Lake Creek	Sprint C	(Canada) Xavier McKeever	(France) Tom Mancini	(United States) Walker Hall
3	11 December 2022	(United States) Lake Creek	10 km F	(France) Tom Mancini	(United States) Zanden McMullen	(Canada) Samuel Gary Hendry
4	7 January 2023	(United States) Houghton	Sprint F	(Norway) Kristoffer Alm Karsrud	(United States) Luke Jager	(France) Tom Mancini
5	14 January 2023	(United States) Cable	30 km C Mst	(United States) Peter Wolter	(United States) Zanden McMullen	(United States) Garrett Butts
6	15 January 2023	(United States) Cable	Sprint C	(United States) Michael Earnhart	(United States) Zanden McMullen	(United States) Logan Diekmann
7	18 February 2023	(United States) Theodore Wirth Park	Sprint F	(Norway) Kristoffer Alm Karsrud	(United States) Zak Ketterson	(United States) Logan Diekmann
8	19 February 2023	(United States) Theodore Wirth Park	30 km C Mst	(United States) Zak Ketterson	(United States) Logan Diekmann	(United States) Finn O'Connell
9	22 March 2023	(United States) Craftsbury	10 km C	(United States) John Steel Hagenbuch	(Norway) Andreas Kirkeng	(United States) David Norris

==== Nor-Am Cup ====
Key: C – Classic / F – Freestyle
Stage	Date	Place	Discipline	Winner	Second	Third
1	30 November 2022	(Canada) Sovereign Lake	Sprint C	(Norway) Magnus Bøe	(United States) Zanden McMullen	(Canada) Xavier McKeever
2	1 December 2022	(Canada) Sovereign Lake	10 km F Mst	(France) Tom Mancini	(United States) John Steel Hagenbuch	(Canada) Russell Kennedy
3	3 December 2022	(Canada) Sovereign Lake	Sprint F	(Norway) Andreas Kirkeng	(United States) John Steel Hagenbuch	(Canada) Julien Locke
4	4 December 2022	(Canada) Sovereign Lake	10 km C	(Norway) Andreas Kirkeng	(United States) Finn O'Connell	(United States) John Steel Hagenbuch
5	18 January 2023	(Canada) Prince George	Sprint C	(Canada) Julian Smith	(Canada) Xavier McKeever	(Canada) Julien Locke
6	19 January 2023	(Canada) Prince George	20 km C Mst	(Canada) Olivier Léveillé	(Canada) Russell Kennedy	(Canada) Léo Grandbois
7	21 January 2023	(Canada) Prince George	10 km F	(Canada) Russell Kennedy	(Canada) Max Hollmann	(Canada) Sasha Masson

=== Women ===
==== Alpen Cup ====
Key: C – Classic / F – Freestyle
Stage	Date	Place	Discipline	Winner	Second	Third
	2 December 2022	(Italy) Pragelato	Sprint F	cancelled, moved to Santa Caterina Valfurva		
	3 December 2022	(Italy) Pragelato	10 km F	cancelled, moved to Santa Caterina Valfurva		
	4 December 2022	(Italy) Pragelato	10 km C Mst	cancelled, moved to Santa Caterina Valfurva		
1	3 December 2022	(Italy) Santa Caterina Valfurva	Sprint F	(Italy) Federica Sanfilippo	(Germany) Lena Keck	(Switzerland) Anja Weber
2	4 December 2022	(Italy) Santa Caterina Valfurva	10 km C	(Italy) Martina Di Centa	(France) Juliette Ducordeau	(Norway) Anikken Gjerde Alnæs
3	17 December 2022	(Austria) Sankt Ulrich am Pillersee	Sprint C	(Switzerland) Desirée Steiner	(France) Melissa Gal	(Czech Republic) Barbora Antošová
4	18 December 2022	(Austria) Sankt Ulrich am Pillersee	20 km F	(Germany) Helen Hoffman	(Czech Republic) Kateřina Razýmová	(France) Melissa Gal
	7 January 2023	(Germany) Zwiesel	Sprint C	cancelled, moved to Oberstdorf on the same dates		
	8 January 2023	(Germany) Zwiesel	20 km C Mst	cancelled, moved to Oberstdorf on the same dates		
5	7 January 2023	(Germany) Oberstdorf	Sprint C	(Germany) Coletta Rydzek	(Switzerland) Nadja Kälin	(Germany) Verena Veit
6	8 January 2023	(Germany) Oberstdorf	20 km C Mst	(Switzerland) Nadja Kälin	(Switzerland) Lea Fischer	(Germany) Helen Hoffman
7	18 February 2023	(Switzerland) Campra	Sprint F	(France) Clémence Didierlaurent	(Germany) Lisa Lohmann	(France) Julie Pierrel
8	19 February 2023	(Switzerland) Campra	20 km C Mst	(Germany) Lisa Lohmann	(Italy) Martina Bellini	(Germany) Germana Thannheimer
9	4 March 2023	(France) Premanon	10 km F	(Germany) Helen Hoffman	(Germany) Lisa Lohmann	(France) Julie Pierrel
10	5 March 2023	(France) Premanon	10 km C Mst	(Germany) Helen Hoffman	(Germany) Verena Veit	(France) Eve Odine Duchaufour
11	17 March 2023	(Italy) Dobbiaco	Sprint F	(Switzerland) Anja Weber	(Germany) Helen Hoffman	(Germany) Lena Keck
12	18 March 2023	(Italy) Dobbiaco	10 km F	(Germany) Helen Hoffman	(Switzerland) Anja Weber	(Germany) Katherine Sauerbrey
13	19 March 2023	(Italy) Dobbiaco	15 km C Pursuit	(Switzerland) Anja Weber	(Germany) Helen Hoffman	(Germany) Katherine Sauerbrey

==== Australia/New Zealand Cup ====
Key: C – Classic / F – Freestyle
Stage	Date	Place	Discipline	Winner	Second	Third
1	30 July 2022	(Australia) Falls Creek	Sprint C	(Australia) Katerina Paul	(Australia) Ella Jackson	(Australia) Phoebe Cridland
2	31 July 2022	(Australia) Falls Creek	10 km F	(Australia) Zana Evans	(Australia) Katerina Paul	(Australia) Phoebe Cridland
3	20 August 2022	(Australia) Perisher	Sprint F	(Australia) Katerina Paul	(Australia) Zana Evans	(Australia) Phoebe Cridland
4	21 August 2022	(Australia) Perisher	5 km C	(Australia) Phoebe Cridland	(Australia) Zana Evans	(Australia) Katerina Paul
5	27 August 2022	(Australia) Falls Creek	42 km F Marathon Mst	(United States) Jessie Diggins	(United States) Julia Kern	(Australia) Casey Wright

==== Balkan Cup ====
Key: C – Classic / F – Freestyle
Stage	Date	Place	Discipline	Winner	Second	Third
	4 February 2023	(Greece) Pigadia	5 km F	cancelled		
	5 February 2023	(Greece) Pigadia	5 km F	cancelled		
1	8 February 2023	(North Macedonia) Mavrovo	5 km F	(Serbia) Anja Ilić	(North Macedonia) Ana Cvetanovska	(Greece) Paraskevi Ladopoulou
2	9 February 2023	(North Macedonia) Mavrovo	5 km F	(Serbia) Anja Ilić	(North Macedonia) Ana Cvetanovska	(Bosnia and Herzegovina) Sara Plakalovic
3	11 February 2023	(Croatia) Ravna Gora	Sprint F	(Croatia) Tena Hadžić	(Croatia) Leona Garac	(Argentina) Nahiara Díaz González
4	12 February 2023	(Croatia) Ravna Gora	5 km C Mass Start	(Croatia) Tena Hadžić	(Croatia) Leona Garac	(Argentina) Nahiara Díaz González
5	4 March 2023	(Bosnia and Herzegovina) Dvorišta-Pale	5 km F	(Serbia) Anja Ilić	(Croatia) Tena Hadžić	(Bulgaria) Kalina Nedyalkova
6	5 March 2023	(Bosnia and Herzegovina) Dvorišta-Pale	5 km F	(Croatia) Tena Hadžić	(Bulgaria) Kalina Nedyalkova	(Romania) Delia Ioana Reit
	7 March 2023	(Serbia) Zlatibor	5 km F	cancelled		
	8 March 2023	(Serbia) Zlatibor	5 km F	cancelled		
	11 March 2023	(Romania) Fundata	10 km F	cancelled		
	12 March 2023	(Romania) Fundata	5 km C	cancelled		
7	23 March 2023	(Turkey) Bolu-Gerede	5 km C	(Turkey) Özlem Ceren Dursun	(Turkey) İrem Dursun	(Turkey) Seher Kaçmaz
8	24 March 2023	(Turkey) Bolu-Gerede	5 km F	(Romania) Delia Ioana Reit	(Turkey) Şennur Kartal	(Bulgaria) Kalina Nedyalkova

==== Eastern Europe Cup ====
Key: C – Classic / F – Freestyle
Stage	Date	Place	Discipline	Winner	Second	Third
1	13 November 2022	(Kazakhstan) Schuchinsk	Sprint C	(Kazakhstan) Anna Melnik	(Kazakhstan) Darya Ryazhko	(Kazakhstan) Aisha Rakisheva
2	14 November 2022	(Kazakhstan) Schuchinsk	10 km C	(Kazakhstan) Kseniya Shalygina	(Kazakhstan) Anna Melnik	(Kazakhstan) Darya Ryazhko
3	15 November 2022	(Kazakhstan) Schuchinsk	15 km F	(Kazakhstan) Kseniya Shalygina	(Kazakhstan) Nadezhda Stepashkina	(Kazakhstan) Aisha Rakisheva
4	21 December 2022	(Kazakhstan) Almaty Soldier Hollow	Sprint F	(Kazakhstan) Nadezhda Stepashkina	(Kazakhstan) Kseniya Shalygina	(Kazakhstan) Aisha Rakisheva
5	22 December 2022	(Kazakhstan) Almaty Soldier Hollow	10 km F	(Kazakhstan) Kseniya Shalygina	(Kazakhstan) Nadezhda Stepashkina	(Kazakhstan) Laura Kinybaeyeva
6	25 December 2022	(Kazakhstan) Almaty Soldier Hollow	20 km C Mst	(Kazakhstan) Kseniya Shalygina	(Kazakhstan) Aisha Rakisheva	(Kazakhstan) Kamila Makhmutova
7	21 March 2023	(Kazakhstan) Schuchinsk	Team Sprint C	(Kazakhstan) Yelizaveta Tomalchyova (Kazakhstan) Darya Ryazhko	(Kazakhstan) Tamara Ebel (Kazakhstan) Valentina Ebel	(Kazakhstan) Anna Melnik (Kazakhstan) Nadezhda Stepashkina
8	22 March 2023	(Kazakhstan) Schuchinsk	15 km C Skiathlon	(Kazakhstan) Kseniya Shalygina	(Kazakhstan) Nadezhda Stepashkina	(Kazakhstan) Aisha Rakisheva
9	24 March 2022	(Kazakhstan) Schuchinsk	Sprint F	(Kazakhstan) Darya Ryazhko	(Kazakhstan) Kseniya Shalygina	(Kazakhstan) Nadezhda Stepashkina
10	25 March 2023	(Kazakhstan) Schuchinsk	10 km C	(Kazakhstan) Kseniya Shalygina	(Kazakhstan) Darya Ryazhko	(Kazakhstan) Aisha Rakisheva
11	28 March 2023	(Kazakhstan) Schuchinsk	30 km F Mst	(Kazakhstan) Nataliay Makerova	(Kazakhstan) Nadezhda Stepashkina	(Kazakhstan) Laura Kinybaeyeva

==== Far East Cup ====
Key: C – Classic / F – Freestyle
Stage	Date	Place	Discipline	Winner	Second	Third
1	17 December 2022	(South Korea) Pyeongchang	5 km C	(Japan) Chika Kobayashi	(Japan) Harune Kamakura	(South Korea) Lee Eui-jin
2	18 December 2022	(South Korea) Pyeongchang	5 km F	(Japan) Chika Kobayashi	(South Korea) Lee Chae-won	(Japan) Harune Kamakura
	26 December 2022	(Japan) Otoineppu	5 km C	cancelled		
	27 December 2022	(Japan) Otoineppu	5 km F	cancelled		
3	7 January 2023	(Japan) Sapporo	5 km C	(Japan) Masae Tsuchiya	(Japan) Rin Sobue	(Japan) Miki Kodama
4	8 January 2023	(Japan) Sapporo	10 km F	(Japan) Masae Tsuchiya	(Japan) Chika Kobayashi	(Japan) Rin Sobue
5	9 January 2023	(Japan) Sapporo	Sprint F	(Japan) Chika Kobayashi	(Japan) Masae Tsuchiya	(Japan) Yuka Yamazaki
6	3 February 2023	(South Korea) Pyeongchang	5 km C	(South Korea) Lee Eui-jin	(South Korea) Lee Chae-won	(South Korea) Han Da-som
7	4 February 2023	(South Korea) Pyeongchang	5 km F	(South Korea) Lee Eui-jin	(South Korea) Han Da-som	(South Korea) Lee Chae-won
8	11 February 2023	(Japan) Shiramine	10 km F	(Japan) Chika Kobayashi	(Japan) Yuka Watanabe	(Japan) Harune Kamakura
9	12 February 2023	(Japan) Shiramine	Sprint C	(Japan) Yuka Watanabe	(Japan) Kaho Nakajima	(Japan) Kozue Takizawa
10	3 March 2023	(Japan) Sapporo	5 km C	(Japan) Chika Kobayashi	(Japan) Yuka Watanabe	(Japan) Shiori Yokohama
11	4 March 2023	(Japan) Sapporo	10 km F	(Japan) Chika Kobayashi	(Japan) Shiori Yokohama	(Japan) Yuka Watanabe

==== Slavic Cup ====
Key: C – Classic / F – Freestyle
Stage	Date	Place	Discipline	Winner	Second	Third
	28 December 2022	(Poland) Wisła-Kubalonka	Sprint C	cancelled, moved to Zakopane		
	29 December 2022	(Poland) Wisła-Kubalonka	10 km F	cancelled, moved to Zakopane		
1	29 December 2022	(Poland) Zakopane	5 km C	(Poland) Weronika Kaleta	(Poland) Daria Szkurat	(Poland) Karolina Kaleta
2	30 December 2022	(Poland) Zakopane	10 km F	(Poland) Daria Szkurat	(Poland) Karolina Kaleta	(Poland) Andżelika Szyszka
3	14 January 2023	(Slovakia) Štrbské Pleso	Sprint C	(Czech Republic) Ema Kouřilová	(Slovakia) Barbora Klementová	(Canada) Anna Jaklová
4	15 January 2023	(Slovakia) Štrbské Pleso	5 km F	(Poland) Andżelika Szyszka	(Slovakia) Barbora Klementová	(Ukraine) Viktoriia Olekh
5	25 February 2023	(Slovakia) Štrbské Pleso	10 km C	(Poland) Daria Szkurat	(Poland) Andżelika Szyszka	(Poland) Magdalena Kobielusz
6	26 February 2023	(Slovakia) Štrbské Pleso	10 km F	(Poland) Daria Szkurat	(Poland) Magdalena Kobielusz	(Poland) Andżelika Szyszka
7	11 March 2023	(Slovakia) Skalka pri Kremnici	Sprint F	(Slovakia) Barbora Klementová	(Ukraine) Viktoriia Olekh	(Slovakia) Laura Roglova
8	12 March 2023	(Slovakia) Skalka pri Kremnici	10 km C Mst	(Ukraine) Viktoriia Olekh	(Ukraine) Anastasiia Nikon	(Ukraine) Anastasiia Ivanchenko
	18 March 2023	(Poland) Jakuszyce	5 km C	cancelled		
	19 March 2023	(Poland) Jakuszyce	15 km F Mst	cancelled		

==== Scandinavian Cup ====
Key: C – Classic / F – Freestyle
Stage	Date	Place	Discipline	Winner	Second	Third
1	16 December 2022	(Sweden) Östersund	Sprint C	(Sweden) Jonna Sundling	(Norway) Anna Svendsen	(Sweden) Linn Svahn
	17 December 2022	(Sweden) Östersund	10 km C	cancelled		
2	18 December 2022	(Sweden) Östersund	20 km C Mst	(Sweden) Jonna Sundling	(Norway) Anna Svendsen	(Sweden) Moa Lundgren
	6 January 2023	(Finland) Rovaniemi	Sprint C	cancelled		
	7 January 2023	(Finland) Rovaniemi	10 km F	cancelled		
	8 January 2023	(Finland) Rovaniemi	20 km C	cancelled		
3	13 January 2023	(Sweden) Falun	10 km F	(Sweden) Ebba Andersson	(Norway) Ragnhild Haga	(Sweden) Moa Lundgren
4	14 January 2023	(Sweden) Falun	Sprint C	(Norway) Anna Svendsen	(Sweden) Ebba Andersson	(Norway) Hedda Bakkemo
5	15 January 2023	(Sweden) Falun	30 km C Mass Start	(Sweden) Ebba Andersson	(Norway) Sigrid Leseth Føyen	(Norway) Anna Svendsen
6	3 March 2023	(Latvia) Madona	Sprint F	(Sweden) Moa Lundgren	(Norway) Maria Hartz Melling	(Sweden) Ingrid Hallquist
7	4 March 2023	(Latvia) Madona	10 km F	(Norway) Margrethe Bergane	(Norway) Marte Skånes	(Norway) Kristin Austgulen Fosnæs
8	5 March 2023	(Latvia) Madona	20 km C Pursuit	(Norway) Margrethe Bergane	(Norway) Marte Skånes	(Norway) Kristin Austgulen Fosnæs

==== South America Cup ====
Key: C – Classic / F – Freestyle
Stage	Date	Place	Discipline	Winner	Second	Third
1	2 September 2022	(Argentina) Cerro Catedral	Sprint C	(Argentina) Maira Sofia Fernandez Righi	(Argentina) Agustina Groetzner Rocco	(Chile) Natalia Ayala
2	3 September 2022	(Argentina) Cerro Catedral	5 km C	(Argentina) Agustina Groetzner Rocco	(Argentina) Nahiara Díaz González	(Argentina) Maira Sofia Fernandez Righi
3	4 September 2022	(Argentina) Cerro Catedral	5 km F	(Argentina) Nahiara Díaz González	(Argentina) María Cecilia Domínguez	(Argentina) Maira Sofia Fernandez Righi
4	21 September 2022	(Chile) Corralco	7.5 km F	(Argentina) María Cecilia Domínguez	(Argentina) Agustina Groetzner Rocco	(Argentina) Maira Sofia Fernandez Righi
	21 September 2022	(Chile) Corralco	7.5 km F	cancelled		
5	22 September 2022	(Chile) Corralco	Sprint F	(Argentina) María Cecilia Domínguez	(Argentina) Nahiara Díaz González	(Argentina) Agustina Groetzner Rocco

==== US Super Tour ====
Key: C – Classic / F – Freestyle
Stage	Date	Place	Discipline	Winner	Second	Third
1	8 December 2022	(United States) Lake Creek	15 km C Mst	(United States) Hailey Swirbul	(United States) Sydney Palmer-Leger	(United States) Samantha Smith
2	10 December 2022	(United States) Lake Creek	Sprint C	(United States) Sydney Palmer-Leger	(United States) Hailey Swirbul	(United States) Alexandra Lawson
3	11 December 2022	(United States) Lake Creek	10 km F	(United States) Alexandra Lawson	(United States) Hailey Swirbul	(United States) Sydney Palmer-Leger
4	7 January 2023	(United States) Houghton	Sprint F	(United States) Hailey Swirbul	(United States) Novie McCabe	(United States) Lauren Jortberg
5	14 January 2023	(United States) Cable	30 km C Mst	(United States) Hannah Rudd	(United States) Mariah Bredal	(United States) Margie Freed
6	15 January 2023	(United States) Cable	Sprint C	(United States) Hannah Rudd	(United States) Margie Freed	(United States) Mariah Bredal
7	18 February 2023	(United States) Theodore Wirth Park	Sprint F	(United States) Lauren Jortberg	(United States) Renae Anderson	(United States) Sarah Goble
8	19 February 2023	(United States) Theodore Wirth Park	20 km C Mst	(United States) Alayna Sonnesyn	(United States) Margie Freed	(United States) Alexandra Lawson
9	22 March 2023	(United States) Craftsbury	10 km C	(United States) Margie Freed	(Sweden) Hanna Abrahamsson	(United States) Alexandra Lawson

==== Nor-Am Cup ====
Key: C – Classic / F – Freestyle
Stage	Date	Place	Discipline	Winner	Second	Third
1	30 November 2022	(Canada) Sovereign Lake	Sprint C	(United States) Hailey Swirbul	(United States) Sydney Palmer-Leger	(Germany) Anna-Maria Dietze
2	1 December 2022	(Canada) Sovereign Lake	10 km F Mst	(Germany) Anna-Maria Dietze	(United States) Sydney Palmer-Leger	(Norway) Karianne Olsvik Dengerud
3	3 December 2022	(Canada) Sovereign Lake	Sprint F	(United States) Hailey Swirbul	(United States) Sarah Goble	(Poland) Weronika Kaleta
4	4 December 2022	(Canada) Sovereign Lake	10 km C	(United States) Hailey Swirbul	(Sweden) Hanna Abrahamsson	(United States) Sydney Palmer-Leger
5	18 January 2023	(Canada) Prince George	Sprint C	(Poland) Izabela Marcisz	(Poland) Monika Skinder	(Canada) Dahria Beatty
6	19 January 2023	(Canada) Prince George	20 km C Mst	(Canada) Jasmine Lyons	(Canada) Liliane Gagnon	(Canada) Olivia Bouffard-Nesbitt
7	21 January 2023	(Canada) Prince George	10 km F	(Poland) Izabela Marcisz	(Estonia) Keidy Kaasiku	(Canada) Jasmine Lyons
