= FIS Nordic World Ski Championships 2023 – Women's 15 kilometre skiathlon =

Women's 15 kilometre skiathlon at the FIS Nordic World Ski Championships 2023
- Venue: Planica Nordic Centre
- Location: Planica, Slovenia
- Dates: 25 February
- Competitors: 54 from 23 nations
- Winning time: 38:11.8

Medalists
gold medal	Ebba Andersson	Sweden
silver medal	Frida Karlsson	Sweden
bronze medal	Astrid Øyre Slind	Norway

The Women's 15 kilometre skiathlon competition at the FIS Nordic World Ski Championships 2023 was held on 25 February 2023.

== Results ==
The race was started at 14:00.

Rank	Bib	Athlete	Country	Time	Deficit
1st place, gold medalist(s)	3	Ebba Andersson	Sweden	38:11.8	
2nd place, silver medalist(s)	2	Frida Karlsson	Sweden	38:33.8	+22.0
3rd place, bronze medalist(s)	14	Astrid Øyre Slind	Norway	38:59.8	+48.0
4	7	Katharina Hennig	Germany	39:05.1	+53.3
5	1	Kerttu Niskanen	Finland	39:08.1	+56.3
6	4	Krista Pärmäkoski	Finland	39:33.9	+1:22.1
7	8	Ingvild Flugstad Østberg	Norway	39:35.7	+1:23.9
8	6	Anne Kjersti Kalvå	Norway	39:35.8	+1:24.0
9	29	Francesca Franchi	Italy	39:37.1	+1:25.3
10	10	Delphine Claudel	France	39:41.5	+1:29.7
11	12	Patrīcija Eiduka	Latvia	39:49.7	+1:37.9
12	11	Silje Theodorsen	Norway	39:51.7	+1:39.9
13	23	Kateřina Razýmová	Czech Republic	39:58.1	+1:46.3
14	20	Pia Fink	Germany	40:04.1	+1:52.3
15	22	Eveliina Piippo	Finland	40:14.6	+2:02.8
16	41	Linn Svahn	Sweden	40:19.4	+2:07.6
17	9	Teresa Stadlober	Austria	40:21.1	+2:09.3
18	36	Cristina Pittin	Italy	40:25.8	+2:14.0
19	5	Rosie Brennan	United States	40:34.7	+2:22.9
20	30	Sydney Palmer-Leger	United States	40:43.8	+2:32.0
21	35	Katherine Sauerbrey	Germany	40:52.9	+2:41.1
22	17	Masako Ishida	Japan	40:57.4	+2:45.6
23	21	Eva Urevc	Slovenia	41:00.7	+2:48.9
24	32	Anna Comarella	Italy	41:12.6	+3:00.8
25	13	Katherine Stewart-Jones	Canada	41:38.3	+3:26.5
26	28	Hailey Swirbul	United States	41:40.3	+3:28.5
27	26	Juliette Ducordeau	France	41:41.8	+3:30.0
28	31	Masae Tsuchiya	Japan	41:42.9	+3:31.1
29	19	Sophia Laukli	United States	41:44.2	+3:32.4
30	24	Caterina Ganz	Italy	42:09.9	+3:58.1
31	25	Lisa Lohmann	Germany	42:09.9	+3:58.1
32	27	Nadja Kälin	Switzerland	42:15.3	+4:03.5
33	16	Kateřina Janatová	Czech Republic	42:45.5	+4:33.7
34	37	Jasmine Lyons	Canada	42:58.6	+4:46.8
35	15	Moa Ilar	Sweden	43:19.0	+5:07.2
36	33	Kseniya Shalygina	Kazakhstan	43:38.6	+5:26.8
37	50	Ellen Soehol Lie	Australia	44:33.9	+6:22.1
38	48	Kamila Makhmutova	Kazakhstan	44:35.1	+6:23.3
39	38	Olivia Bouffard-Nesbitt	Canada	44:53.6	+6:23.9
40	34	Rin Sobue	Japan	44:53.7	+6:41.8
41	39	Carola Vila Obiols	Andorra	44:35.7	+6:41.9
42	47	Phoebe Cridland	Australia	44:58.6	+6:46.8
43	46	Neža Žerjav	Slovenia	45.04.1	+6.52.3
44	45	Nina Riedener	Liechtenstein	45:13.2	+7:01.4
45	42	Aisha Rakisheva	Kazakhstan	45:58.9	+7:47.1
46	54	Sophia Tsu Velicer	Chinese Taipei	46:10.3	+7:58.5
47	53	Anita Klemenčič	Slovenia	46:24.6	+8:12.8
48	44	Viktoriya Olekh	Ukraine	47:01.9	+8:50.1
49	49	Anastasiya Nikon	Ukraine	48:15.7	+10:03.9
50	52	Lucija Medja	Slovenia	49:21.0	+11:09.2
51	51	Samaneh Beyrami Baher	Iran	Lapped	
52	43	Paraskevi Ladopoulou	Greece	Lapped	
53	40	Ana Cvetanovska	North Macedonia	Lapped	
	18	Anne Kyllönen	Finland	Did not finish	
