= La Parva =

Ski resort in Chile

Centro de Ski La Parva
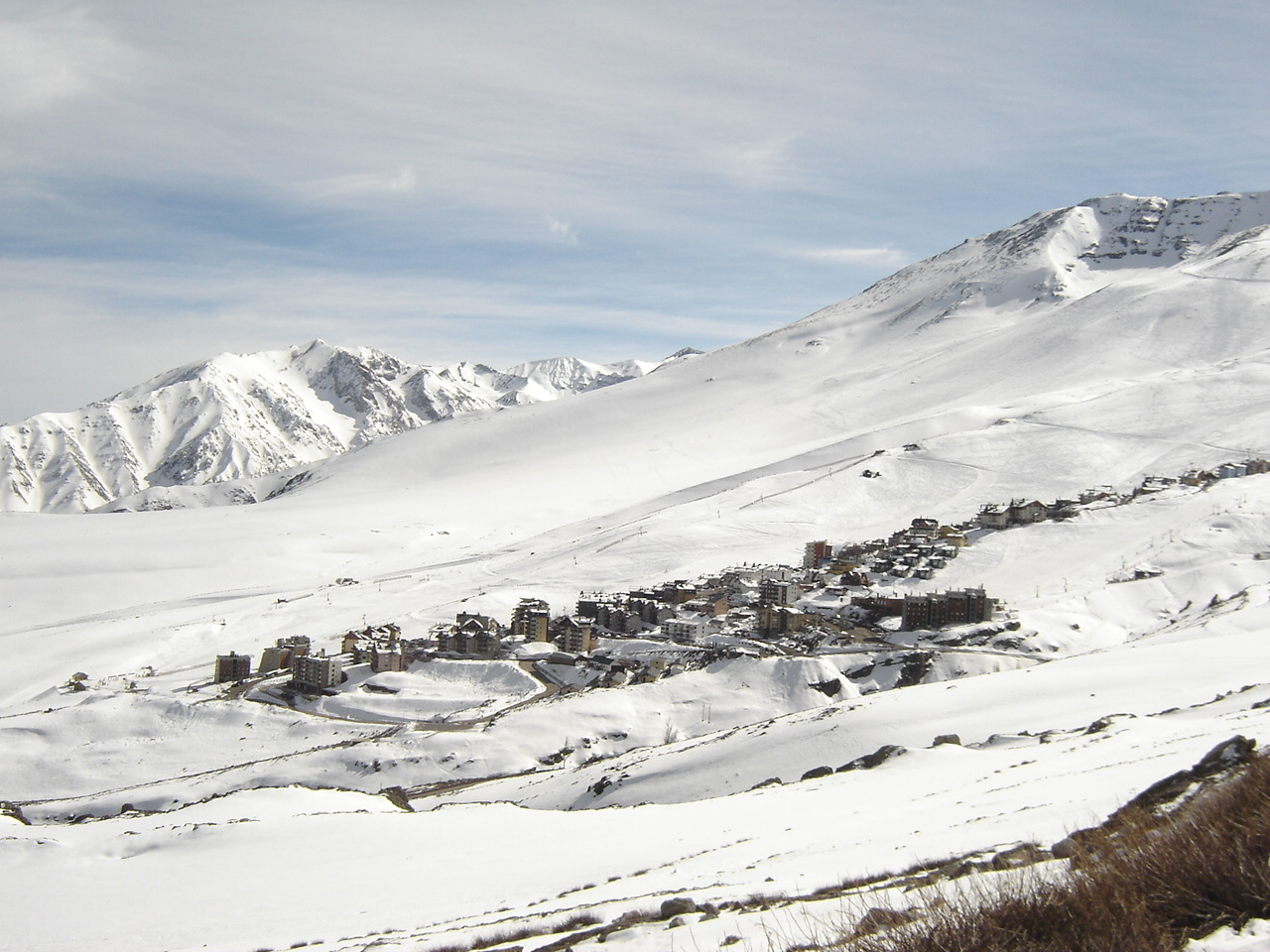
- Interactive map of Centro de Ski La Parva
- Location: Andes Mountains, Chile
- Nearest city: Santiago, Chile 33.3356°S 70.2905°W
- Vertical: 960 m (3,150 ft)
- Top elevation: 3,630 m (11,910 ft)
- Base elevation: 2,670 m (8,760 ft)
- Skiable area: 400 ha (990 acres)
- Trails: 20
- Longest run: 2.4 km (1.5 mi)
- Lift system: 14 total; 4 chairlifts (2 quad, 1 triple, 1 double), 10 surface lifts
- Terrain parks: 1 (very small)
- Snowfall: 7.62 m (25 ft)
- Snowmaking: yes
- Website: https://www.laparva.cl

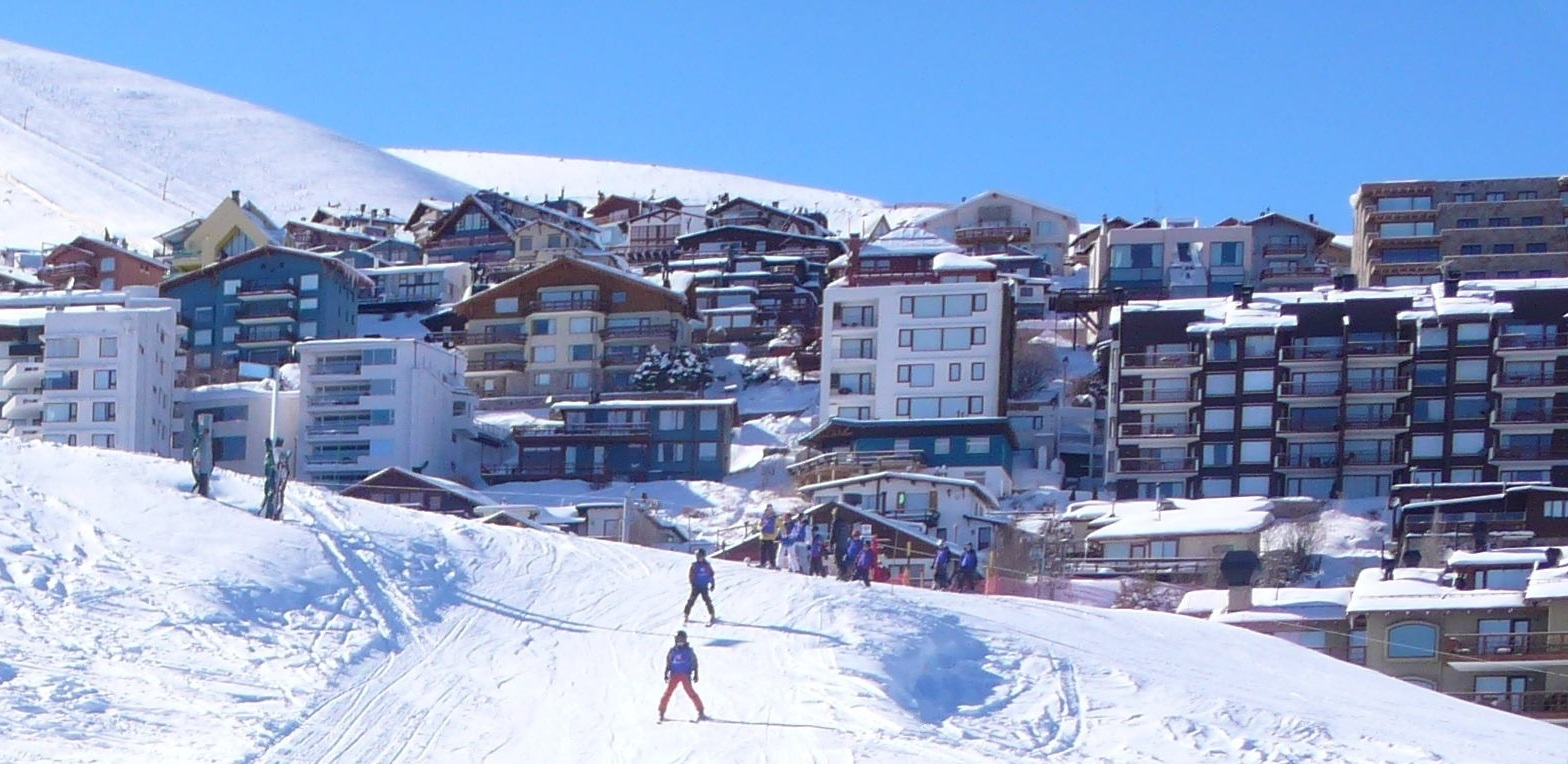
Ski in La Parva.

La Parva is a town and ski resort located about 50 km (31 mi) northeast of the Chilean capital of Santiago. It is in the middle ridge of the "3 Valleys" resorts that also includes El Colorado and Valle Nevado.

It has mechanized equipment for maintenance and repair of the slopes, twelve lifts of which two are for 4 and 3 people, covering a distance of 9673 meters. The maximum skiable height is 3630 meters above sea level.
