= Lisa Lohmann =

German cross-country skier (born 2000)

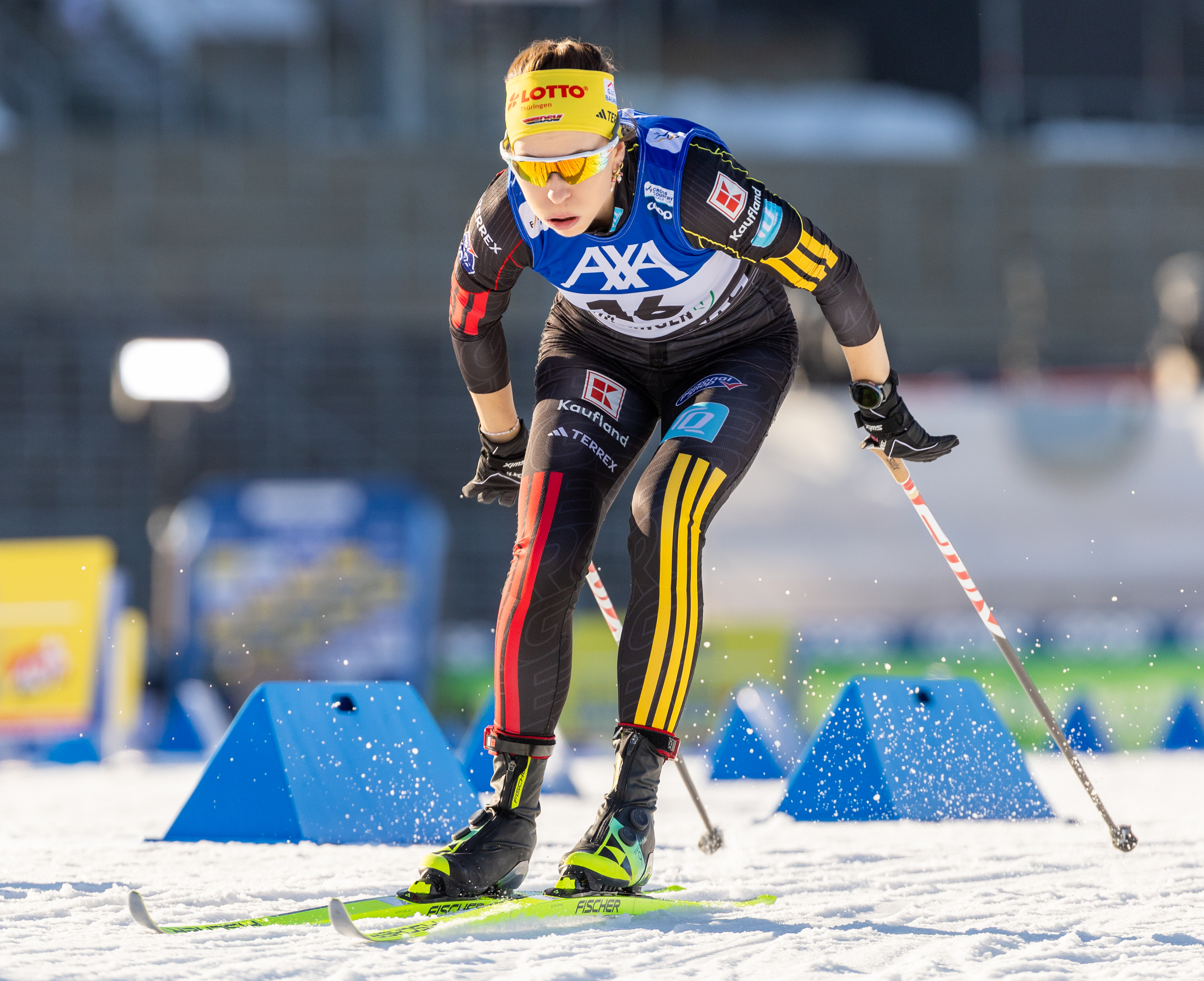

Personal information
- Nationality: Germany
- Born: 9 November 2000 (age 25)

Sport
- Sport: Skiing
- Club: WSV Oberhof 05

World Cup career
- Seasons: 2 – (2022–present)
- Indiv. starts: 22
- Indiv. podiums: 0
- Team starts: 1
- Team podiums: 0
- Overall titles: 0 – (72nd in 2022)
- Discipline titles: 0
Medal record
Women's cross-country skiing
Representing Germany
U23 World Championships
Gold medal – first place	2021 Vuokatti	Individual sprint
Silver medal – second place	2023 Whistler	20 km classical
Junior World Championships
Gold medal – first place	2018 Goms	4 × 3.33 km relay
Silver medal – second place	2020 Oberwiesenthal	5 km classical
- Updated on 27 March 2023

Lisa Lohmann (born 9 November 2000) is a German cross-country skier.

She participated in the sprint event at the FIS Nordic World Ski Championships 2021.

== Cross-country skiing results ==
All results are sourced from the International Ski Federation (FIS).

=== World Championships ===
Year	Age	10 km individual	15 km skiathlon	30 km mass start	Sprint	4 × 5 km relay	Team sprint
2021	20	39	34	—	44	—	9
2023	22	—	31	—	—	—	—

=== World Cup ===
==== Season standings ====
Season	Age	Discipline standings				Ski Tour standings
Season	Age	Overall	Distance	Sprint	U23	Tour de Ski
2022	21	72	53	NC	11	31
2023	22	75	60	108	11	34
