= Sydney Palmer-Leger =

American cross-country skier (born 2002)

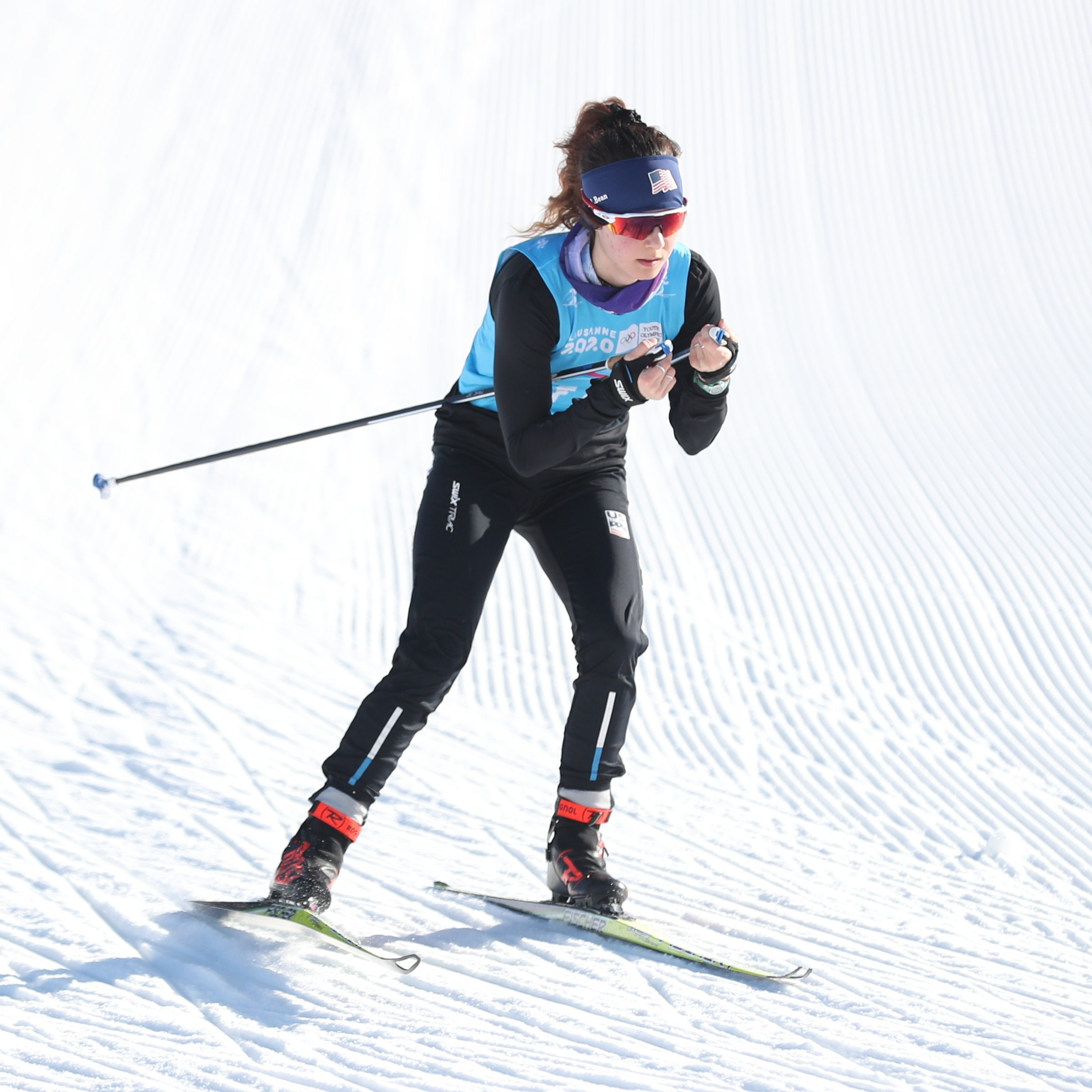

Personal information
- Born: 4 February 2002 (age 24) Park City, Utah, U.S.

Sport
- Country: United States
- Sport: Skiing
Medal record
Junior World Championships
Silver medal – second place	2020 Oberwiesenthal	4 × 3.33 km relay
- Updated on 1 March 2026

Sydney Palmer-Ledger (born February 4, 2002) is an American cross-country skier.

== Career ==
Sydney Palmer-Ledger was born and raised in Park City, Utah. Inspired by her older brother, Palmer-Ledger first learned to ski as a U10/12 through The Utah Nordic Alliance (TUNA) program. She graduated in 2020 from Sun Valley Community School, having transferred there for her final two years of high school.

Palmer-Ledger won a silver medal as part of the 4 × 3.3 km women's relay team at the 2020 Nordic Junior World Ski Championships in Oberwiesenthal, Germany.

== Cross-country skiing results ==
All results are sourced from the International Ski Federation (FIS).

=== World Championships ===
Year	Age	Individual	Skiathlon	Mass start	Sprint	Relay	Team sprint
2023	21	—	20	DNF	—	—	—
