= Hailey Swirbul =

American cross-country skier (born 1998)

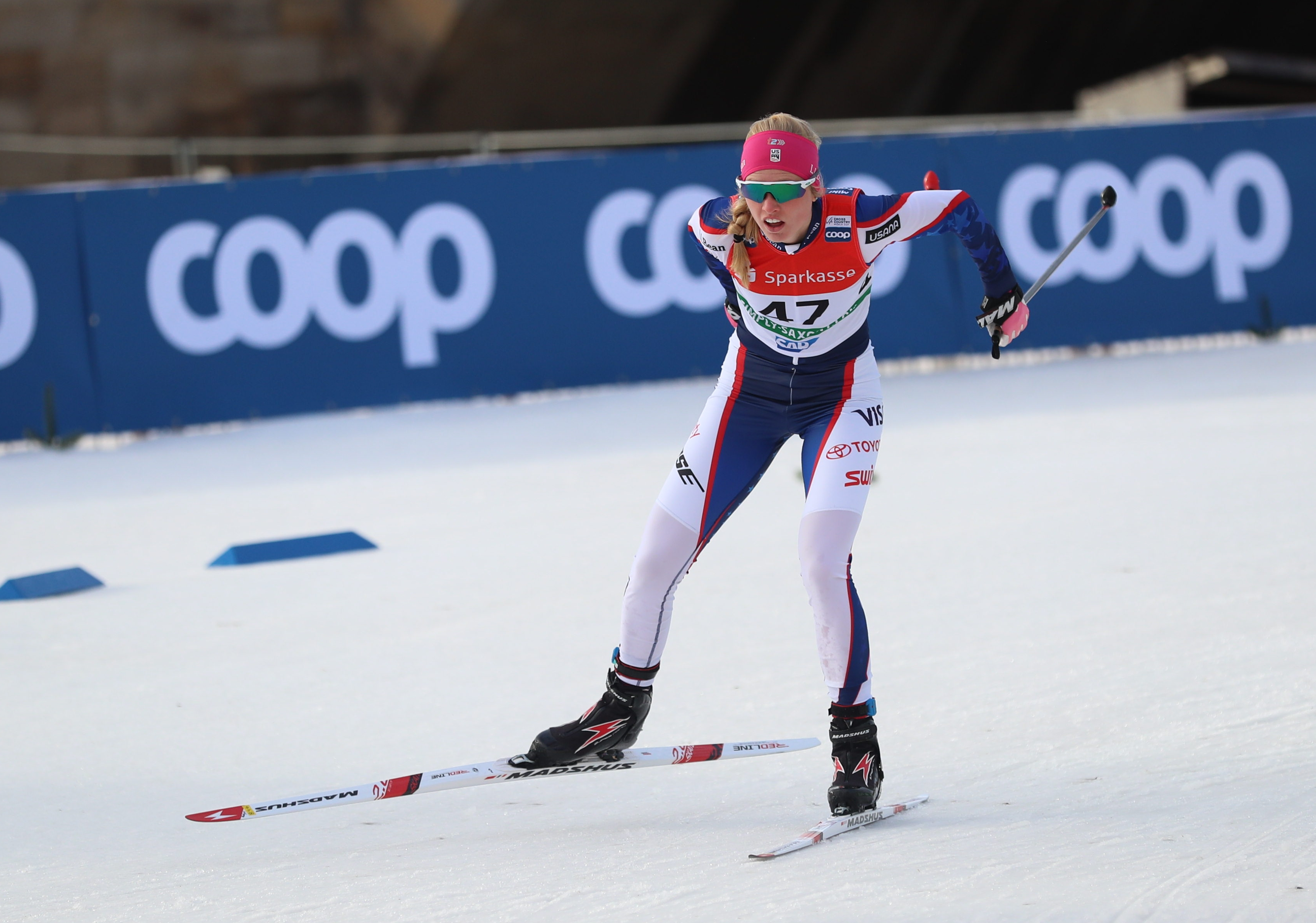
- Swirbul in January 2019

Personal information
- Nationality: United States
- Born: July 10, 1998 (age 28) El Jebel, Colorado, U.S.

Sport
- Sport: Skiing
- Club: APU Nordic Ski Center

World Cup career
- Seasons: 5 – (2019–2023)
- Indiv. starts: 55
- Indiv. podiums: 1
- Indiv. wins: 0
- Team starts: 6
- Team podiums: 1
- Team wins: 0
- Overall titles: 0 – (23rd in 2021)
- Discipline titles: 0
Medal record
Women's cross-country skiing
Representing United States
Junior World Championships
Silver medal – second place	2018 Goms	5 km classical
Bronze medal – third place	2017 Park City	4 × 3.33 km relay
Bronze medal – third place	2018 Goms	10 km skiathlon

Hailey Swirbul (born July 10, 1998) is an American cross-country skier. Although she initially retired following the 2022/2023 season, she announced in fall 2025 that she was returning to professional skiing in time for the 2025/2026 World Cup race season.

On December 13, 2020, she clinched her first podium in the FIS Cross-Country World Cup by finishing third in the 10 km freestyle race in Davos, Switzerland.

She announced her retirement from cross-country skiing on March 27, 2023.

She however competed and placed 19th in the 50 km classical race at the 2026 Winter Olympics.

Her brother Keegan is a professional road cyclist.

== Cross-country skiing results ==
All results are sourced from the International Ski Federation (FIS).

=== Olympic Games ===
Year	Age	10 km individual	15 km skiathlon	30 km mass start	Sprint	4 × 5 km relay	Team sprint
2022	23	32	40	—	—	6	—
2026	27	39	—	19	—	—	—

=== World Championships ===
Year	Age	10 km individual	15 km skiathlon	30 km mass start	Sprint	4 × 5 km relay	Team sprint
2021	22	—	37	26	—	4	—
2023	24	—	26	18	33	5	—

=== World Cup ===
==== Season standings ====
Season	Age	Discipline standings				Ski Tour standings			
Season	Age	Overall	Distance	Sprint	U23	Nordic Opening	Tour de Ski	Ski Tour 2020	World Cup Final
2019	20	NC	NC	NC	NC	—	—	—N/a	41
2020	21	77	59	75	19	54	—	—	—N/a
2021	22	23	21	30	4	32	18	—N/a	—N/a
2022	23	44	29	44	—N/a	—N/a	DNF	—N/a	—N/a
2023	24	51	44	46	—N/a	—N/a	—	—N/a	—N/a

==== Individual podiums ====
- 1 podium – (1 WC)

No.	Season	Date	Location	Race	Level	Place
1	2020–21	December 13, 2020	Davos, Switzerland	10 km Individual F	World Cup	3rd

==== Team podiums ====
- 1 podium – (1 RL)

No.	Season	Date	Location	Race	Level	Place	Teammates
1	2022–23	February 5, 2023	Toblach, Italy	4 × 7.5 km Relay C/F	World Cup	3rd	Brennan / Diggins / Kern
