= María Cecilia Domínguez =

Personal information
- Born: 8 April 1981 (age 45) San Carlos de Bariloche
- Height: 163 cm (5 ft 4 in)
- Weight: 53 kg (117 lb)

Sport
- Country: Argentina
- Sport: Cross-country skiing
- Club: Club Andino Bariloche / Argentine Army

María Cecilia Domínguez (Latin American Spanish: [maˈɾi.a seˈsilja ðoˈmiŋɡes]; (Note: In isolation, Domínguez is pronounced [doˈmiŋɡes].) born, 8 April 1981) is a cross-country skiing player and technical drawer from Argentina.

== Sports career ==
She used to practice athletics at a young age, in specialties like medium distance. Her first contact with skiing was at the age of 20, while practicing for the team of the Bariloche Municipality. She then joined the team of the Argentine Army.

She specializes in different biathlon disciplines, such as sprint and pursuit. In cross-country skiing, she specializes in freestyle. She was the South American Champion of biathlon seven times, the last time being in August 2017 in Chile. That same year, she participated in the Argentine Winter Games, celebrated in Cerro Catedral, obtaining good results.

Her coaches are Gastón Fanti, Damián Gutiérrez, and Sergio Martínez, all members of the Argentine Army.

=== Pyeongchang 2018 ===
She qualified for the 2018 Winter Olympics after the International Ski Federation guaranteed a quota for the Argentine team, and participated in the Ladies' 10 km Free Style, finishing in the 87th place. With this, she became the first Argentine woman to participate in cross-country skiing at the Winter Olympics.

== Personal life ==
She lives in San Carlos de Bariloche, and studied at the Centro de Capacitación Técnica de Bariloche. She is a member of the Argentine Army as reserve soldier and technical drawer.

She is married to Axel Nicolás Ciuffo, who has also represented Argentina in various competitions of biathlon and cross-country skiing. Together, they have one daughter.
