= Vitaliy Pukhkalo =

Kazakh cross-country skier (born 1992)

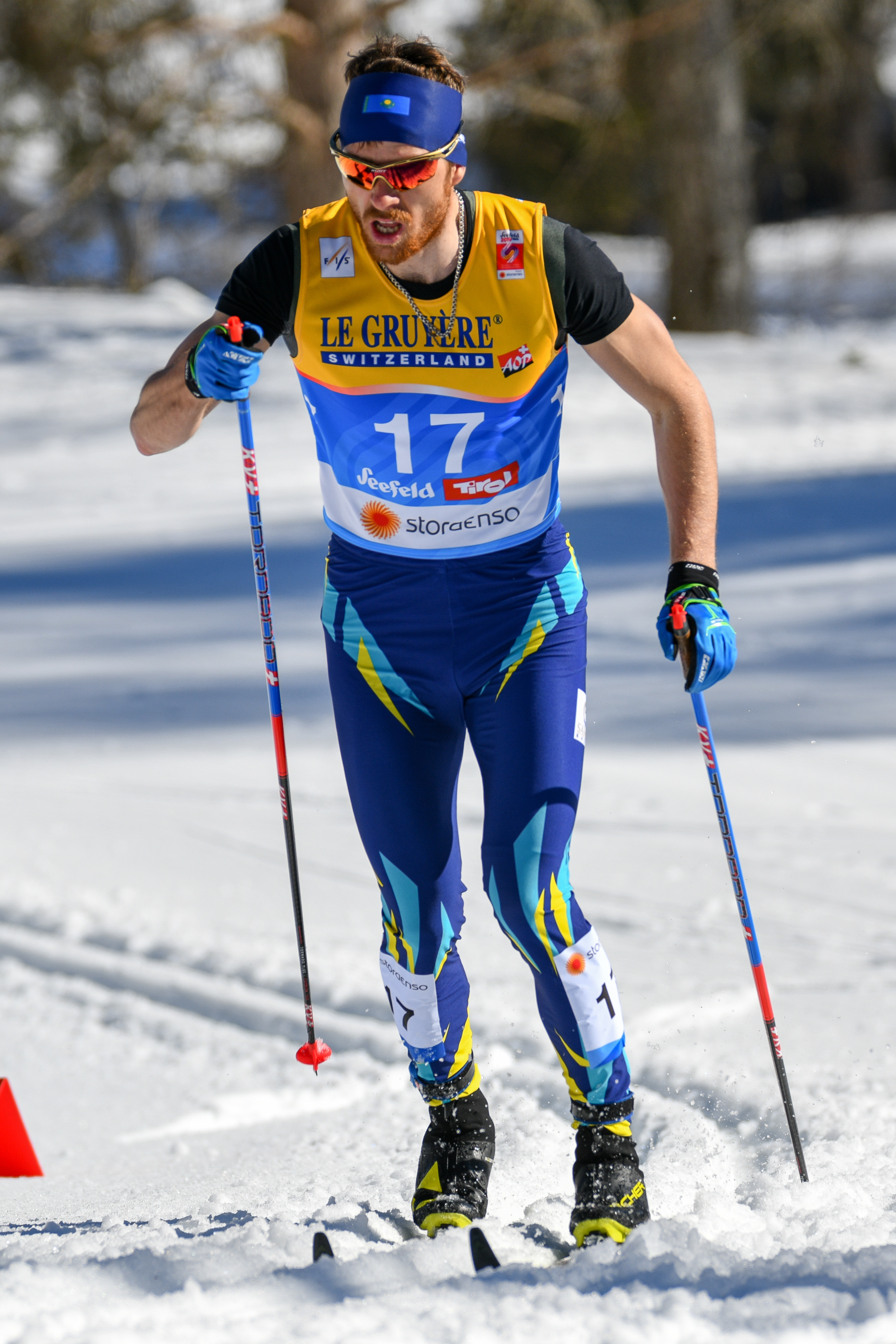
- Pukhkalo in 2019

Personal information
- Native name: Виталий Дмитриевич Пухкало
- Nationality: Kazakhstan
- Born: 9 September 1992 (age 33) Kostanay, Kostanay Region, Kazakhstan

Sport
- Sport: Skiing

World Cup career
- Seasons: 6 – (2017–2020, 2022–present)
- Indiv. starts: 52
- Indiv. podiums: 0
- Team starts: 6
- Team podiums: 0
- Overall titles: 0 – (47th in 2020)
- Discipline titles: 0
- Updated on 29 March 2023

Vitaliy Dmitriyevich Pukhkalo (Russian: Виталий Дмитриевич Пухкало; born 9 September 1992) is a Kazakh cross-country skier who competes internationally.

He participated at the 2018 and 2026 Winter Olympics.

== Cross-country skiing results ==
All results are sourced from the International Ski Federation (FIS).

=== Olympic Games ===
| Year | Age | 15 km individual | 30 km skiathlon | 50 km mass start | Sprint | 4 × 10 km relay | Team sprint |
|---|---|---|---|---|---|---|---|
| 2018 | 25 | 54 | 34 | 52 | — | 8 | — |
| 2022 | 29 | 25 | 32 | —^{[a]} | 66 | — | — |

^{a} Distance reduced to 30 km due to weather conditions.

=== World Championships ===
| Year | Age | 15 km individual | 30 km skiathlon | 50 km mass start | Sprint | 4 × 10 km relay | Team sprint |
|---|---|---|---|---|---|---|---|
| 2017 | 24 | 47 | 46 | 39 | — | — | — |
| 2019 | 26 | 50 | 48 | DNS | — | 7 | — |
| 2021 | 28 | 53 | 47 | DNF | 61 | 12 | — |
| 2023 | 30 | DSQ | 25 | — | — | 13 | — |

=== World Cup ===
==== Season standings ====
| Season | Age | Discipline standings | | | Ski Tour standings | | | |
| Season | Age | Overall | Distance | Sprint | Nordic Opening | Tour de Ski | Ski Tour 2020 | World Cup Final |
|---|---|---|---|---|---|---|---|---|
| 2017 | 24 | NC | NC | — | — | — | —N/a | — |
| 2018 | 25 | NC | NC | — | — | — | —N/a | — |
| 2019 | 26 | 133 | 94 | NC | 67 | — | —N/a | — |
| 2020 | 27 | 47 | 38 | NC | 44 | DNF | 22 | —N/a |
| 2022 | 29 | 136 | NC | NC | —N/a | 45 | —N/a | —N/a |
| 2023 | 30 | 169 | 109 | NC | —N/a | DNF | —N/a | —N/a |
