= Kangaroo Hoppet =

Australian long distance cross-country skiing race

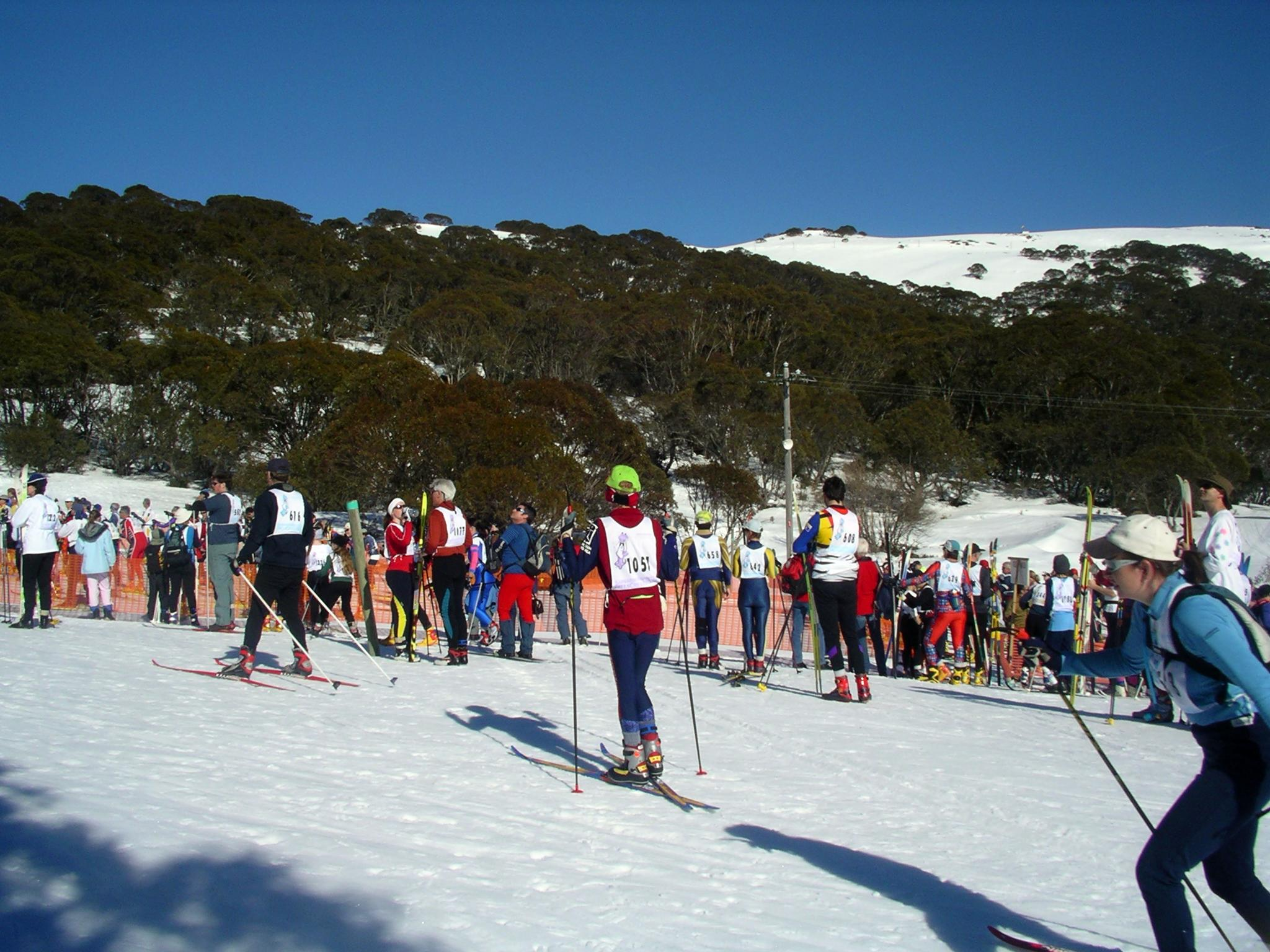
- Competitors massing for the start of the 2005 Kangaroo Hoppet
- Status: Active
- Genre: Sporting event
- Date: August
- Frequency: Annually
- Locations: Falls Creek, Victoria
- Country: Australia
- Inaugurated: 1979

The Kangaroo Hoppet is a long distance cross-country skiing race in Australia. It is held annually in Falls Creek, Victoria, on the fourth Saturday of August. The race debuted in 1979 and became part of Worldloppet in 1991.

The event consists of three races:

- The Kangaroo Hoppet – a 42 km race which, for the purposes of the Worldloppet, counts as a main race;
- The Australian Birkebeiner – a 21 km race which, for the purposes of Worldloppet, counts as a short race;
- The Joey Hoppet – a 7 km race which does not count as either a main race or a short race.

== History ==
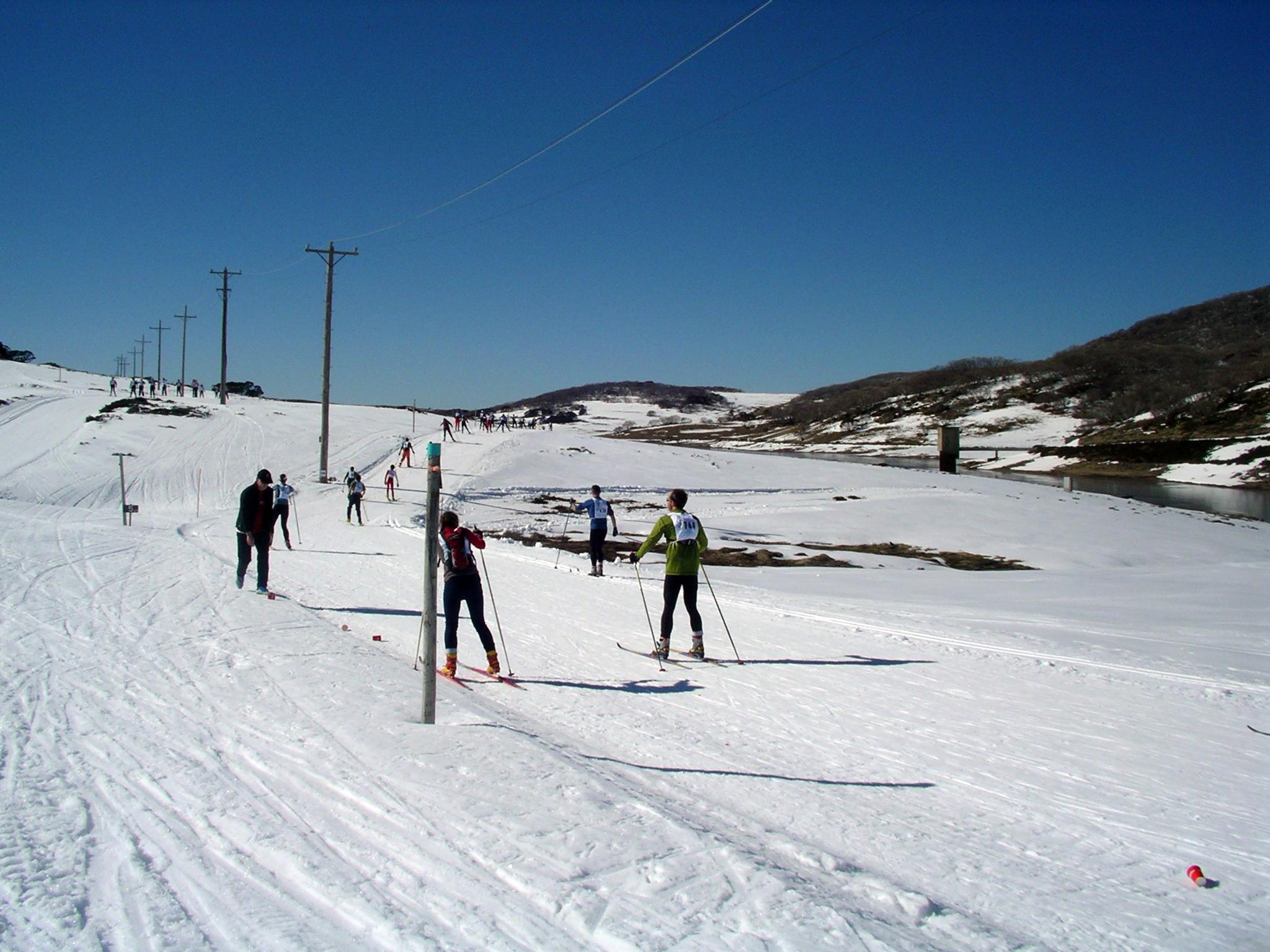
Skiers in the Sun Valley loop of the Hoppet

The Kangaroo Hoppet has its origins in the Birkebeiner Nordic Ski Club's 21 km Australian Birkebeiner, first held in 1979 in Falls Creek. The race was based on the original Norwegian Birkebeiner. In 1989, the organisation extended the race to a 42 km race and added the 21 km race and 7 km race (originally known as the Birkebeiner Lite). The Worldloppet was then petitioned in 1990 to allow a race in the southern hemisphere, and as part of its petition the race format was changed to a freestyle event. The first race as part of the Worldloppet circuit was held in 1991.

In 2024, the Kangaroo Hoppet joined Ski Classics as part of their Challenger series of cross country races, although the race itself was cancelled a few days before it was due to take place.

== Cancelled events ==
The race has been cancelled four times in recent years.

- 2020: Cancelled due to COVID-19 pandemic (Virtual Event only).
- 2021: Cancelled due to COVID-19 pandemic (Virtual Event only).
- 2023: Cancelled due to lack of snow.
- 2024: Cancelled due to lack of snow.

== Winners ==
=== Men ===
Year	Kangaroo Hoppet	Australian Birkebeiner	Joey Hoppet
2025	Phillip Bellingham (AUS)	Noah Bradford (AUS)	Alberto Allan (AUS)
2024	N/A	N/A	N/A
2023	N/A	N/A	N/A
2022	Peter Wolter (USA)	Noah Bradford (AUS)	Jayden Spring (AUS)
2021	N/A	N/A	N/A
2020	N/A	N/A	N/A
2019	Valerio Leccardi (SUI)	Bentley Walker-Broose (AUS)	John Mordes (AUS)
2018	Valerio Leccardi (SUI)	Nic Blackwell (AUS)	Hugo Hinckfuss (AUS)
2017	Miles Havlick (USA)	Seve de Campo (AUS)	Fedele de Campo (AUS)
2016	Matt Gelso (USA)	Liam Burton (AUS)	Bentley Walker-Broose (AUS)
2015	Valerio Leccardi (SUI)	Damon Morton (AUS)	Jarrah Forrer (AUS)
2014	Valerio Leccardi (SUI)	Damon Morton (AUS)	Matthew Bull (AUS)
2013	Alexander Legkov (RUS)	Ilia Chernousov (RUS)	Alexey Chernousov (RUS)
2012	Alexander Legkov (RUS)	Paul Kovacs (AUS)	Hamish Roberts (AUS)
2011	Petr Novák (CZE)	Phillip Bellingham (AUS)	Damon Morton (AUS)
2010	Valerio Leccardi (SUI)	Mark Raymond (AUS)	Alistair Tutt (AUS)
2009	Ben Sim (AUS)	Nick Grimmer (AUS)	Alistair Tutt (AUS)
2008	Ben Sim (AUS)	Callum Watson (AUS)	Dyllan Harmer (AUS)
2007	Thomas Freimuth (GER)	Alex Almoukov (AUS)	Mark Pollock (AUS)
2006	Ben Sim (AUS)	Neil Van der Ploeg (AUS)	Mark Hogg (NZL)
2005	Ben Sim (AUS)	Ben Koons (NZL)	Callum Watson (AUS)
2004	Ben Derrick (AUS)	Mark Van der Ploeg (AUS)	Simon Flowers (AUS)
2003	Ben Derrick (AUS)	Ben Sim (AUS)	Neil Van der Ploeg (AUS)
2002	Stanislav Řezáč (CZE)	Dan Van der Ploeg (AUS)	Lachlan Rodd (AUS)
2001	Ben Derrick (AUS)	Ben Sim (Australia)	Andrew Cirosta (AUS)
2000	Ben Derrick (AUS)	Dan Van der Ploeg (AUS)	Nicholas Grimmer (AUS)
1999	Vitaly Tchernov (RUS)	Dan Van der Ploeg (AUS)	Peter Malcolm (AUS)
1998	Ales Vanek (CZE)	Sam Lee (NZL)	Daniel Sarri (AUS)
1997	Paul Gray (AUS)	Byung Joo Park (KOR)	Michael Evans (AUS)
1996	Johann Mühlegg (GER)	Michael Brennan (AUS)	Paul Murray (AUS)
1995	Andre Jungen (SUI)	Sean Donohue (AUS)	Andrew Slocombe (AUS)
1994	Peter Schlickenrieder (GER)	Sean Donohue (AUS)	Thomas Rassuchine (USA)
1993	Anders Aukland (NOR)	Paul Gray (AUS)	Tim Retchford (AUS)
1992	Gudmund Skjeldal (NOR)	Park Byung Chil (KOR)	Kim Woo Soup (KOR)
1991	John Aalberg (USA)	Park Byung Chil (KOR)	Tim Retchford (AUS)

=== Women ===
Year	Kangaroo Hoppet	Australian Birkebeiner	Joey Hoppet
2025	Rosie Fordham (AUS)	Rosie Franzke (AUS)	Ivy Potocki (AUS)
2024	N/A	N/A	N/A
2023	N/A	N/A	N/A
2022	Jessie Diggins (USA)	Phoebe Cridland (AUS)	Damika Morton (AUS)
2021	N/A	N/A	N/A
2020	N/A	N/A	N/A
2019	Iris Pressey (FRA)	Ella Jackson (AUS)	Zane Evens (AUS)
2018	Barbara Jezersek (AUS)	Darcie Morton (AUS)	Zane Evens (AUS)
2017	Barbara Jezersek (AUS)	Darcie Morton (AUS)	Zane Evens (AUS)
2016	Deedra Irwin (USA)	Ella Jackson (AUS)	Maysen Duffy (AUS)
2015	Maria Graefnings (SWE)	Katerina Paul (AUS)	Darcie Morton (AUS)
2014	Valentina Shevchenko (UKR)	Casey Wright (AUS)	Gabrielle Hawkins (AUS)
2013	Marina Czernousova (RUS)	Lauren Fritz (USA)	Chisa Obayashi (JPN)
2012	Maria Graefnings (SWE)	Anna Trnka (AUS)	Jillian Colebourn (AUS)
2011	Esther Bottomley (AUS)	Anna Trnka (AUS)	Xanthea Dewez (AUS)
2010	Esther Bottomley (AUS)	Lucy Granville (AUS)	Gabriella Cigana (AUS)
2009	Katherine Calder (NZL)	Lucy Granville (AUS)	Anna Trnka (AUS)
2008	Evelyn Dong (USA)	Chloe McConville (AUS)	Lucy Glanville (AUS)
2007	Katherine Calder (NZL)	Aimee Watson (AUS)	Georgia Merritt (AUS)
2006	Natascia Leonardi-Cortesi (SUI)	Alexa Truzian (USA)	D'Arcy Baxter (AUS)
2005	Clare-Louise Brumley (AUS)	Sally Cunningham (AUS)	Jaffa Withers (AUS)
2004	Clare-Louise Brumley (AUS)	Esther Bottomley (AUS)	Chloe McConville (AUS)
2003	Belinda Phillips (AUS)	Katherine Calder (NZL)	Aimee Watson (AUS)
2002	Belinda Phillips (AUS)	Katherine Calder (NZL)	Sally Cunningham (AUS)
2001	Belinda Phillips (AUS)	Rhiannon Palmer (AUS)	Esther Bottomley (AUS)
2000	Camille Melvey (AUS)	Sandra Paul (AUS)	Esther Bottomley (AUS)
1999	Jannike Oeyen (NOR)	Deb Godsmark (AUS)	Esther Bottomley (AUS)
1998	Nadia Simak (RUS)	Natasha Coleman (AUS)	Katherine Calder (NZL)
1997	Camille Melvey (AUS)	Myung Jung Koon (KOR)	Natasha Coleman (AUS)
1996	Hanne Lahtinen (FIN)	Belinda Phillips (AUS)	Kate Spiller (AUS)
1995	Maria Theurl (AUT)	Jenny Griffiths (AUS)	Jessica Hart (AUS)
1994	Antonina Ordina (SWE)	Xeniya Maltseva (RUS)	Lynette Deschler (USA)
1993	Elena Peretyagina (RUS)	Sandra Paul (AUS)	Larissa Trease (AUS)
1992	Beatrice Grunenfelder (SUI)	Yoon Wha Ja (KOR)	Cho Eun Sook (KOR)
1991	Betsy Youngman (USA)	Miffy Cross (AUS)	Kate L'Huillier (AUS)
