= Australia/New Zealand Cup =

Series of cross-country skiing event in Oceania

FIS Cross-Country Australia/New Zealand Cup
- Genre: Cross-country skiing
- Date: Southern wintertime season
- Begins: July
- Ends: September
- Locations: Australia; New Zealand
- Inaugurated: 2005
- Organiser: International Ski Federation
- 2019 FIS Cross-Country Australia/New Zealand Cup

The Australia/New Zealand Cup (ANC) is a series of cross-country skiing events arranged by the International Ski Federation (FIS). It is one of the nine FIS Cross-Country Continental Cups, a second-level competition ranked below the World Cup. The Australia/New Zealand Cup is open for competitors from all nations, but are mainly a competition for skiers from Australia and New Zealand. It is the only Continental Cup taking place in the Southern Hemisphere.

The Australia/New Zealand Cup has been held since the 2005, and has been a part of the Cross-Country Continental Cup since then.

== World Cup qualification ==
In the end of certain periods, the overall leaders for both genders receive a place in the World Cup in the following period. The overall winners of the season receive a place in the World Cup in the beginning of the following season.

== Overall winners ==
=== Men ===
Season	Winner	Second	Third
2006	(Australia) Ben Sim (1)	(France) Geoffroy Pais	(Australia) Ben Derrick
2007	(Australia) Paul Murray	(Australia) Ben Sim	(Japan) Tomio Kanamaru
2008	(Australia) Ben Sim (2)	(France) Geoffroy Pais	(Australia) Andrew Mock
2009	(Switzerland) Thomas Diezig	(Australia) Ben Sim	(Switzerland) Valerio Leccardi
2010	(Australia) Callum Watson (1)	(Australia) Ben Sim	(Australia) Chris Darlington
2011	(Australia) Callum Watson (2)	(Australia) Ben Sim	(Australia) Phillip Bellingham
2012	(Australia) Callum Watson (3)	(Russia) Alexander Legkov	(Australia) Alexei Almoukov
2013	(Sweden) Victor Gustafsson	(Australia) Callum Watson	(Australia) Phillip Bellingham
2014	(Switzerland) Valerio Leccardi	(Australia) Phillip Bellingham	(Australia) Paul Kovacs
2015	(Australia) Phillip Bellingham (1)	(Australia) Callum Watson	(Australia) Alasdair Tutt
2016	(Australia) Phillip Bellingham (2)	(Australia) Nick Montgomery	(Australia) Jackson Bursill
2017	(Australia) Phillip Bellingham (3)	(Australia) Callum Watson	(Australia) Paul Kovacs
2018	(Australia) Phillip Bellingham (4)	(Australia) Callum Watson	(Australia) Mark Pollock
2019	(Australia) Phillip Bellingham (5)	(Switzerland) Lauro Brändli	(Australia) Seve De Campo
2020	Not held due to the coronavirus pandemic		
2021	(Australia) Phillip Bellingham (6)	(Australia) Seve De Campo	(Australia) Mark Pollock
2022	(Australia) Seve De Campo	(Australia) Lars Young Vik	(Australia) Bentley Walker-Broose

=== Women ===
Season	Winner	Second	Third
2006	(New Zealand) Samantha Bondarenko	(Switzerland) Natascia Leonardi Cortesi	(New Zealand) Katherine Calder
2007	(New Zealand) Katherine Calder (1)	(Australia) Esther Bottomley	(New Zealand) Samantha Bondarenko
2008	(Australia) Esther Bottomley (1)	(Australia) Aimee Watson	(United States) Evelyn Dong
2009	(New Zealand) Katherine Calder (2)	(Australia) Esther Bottomley	(Australia) Aimee Watson
2010	(Australia) Esther Bottomley (2)	(Australia) Aimee Watson	(Australia) Belinda Phillips
2011	(Australia) Esther Bottomley (3)	(Australia) Lucy Glanville	(Australia) Georgia Merritt
2012	(Australia) Esther Bottomley (4)	(Poland) Justyna Kowalczyk	(Australia) Aimee Watson
2013	(Japan) Chisa Ōbayashi	(Australia) Jessica Yeaton	(Poland) Justyna Kowalczyk
2014	(Australia) Esther Bottomley (5)	(Australia) Jessica Yeaton	(Australia) Anna Trnka
2015	(Slovenia) Barbara Jezeršek(1)	(Australia) Katerina Paul	(Australia) Casey Wright
2016	(Australia) Katerina Paul (1)	(Australia) Aimee Watson	(United States) Mary Rose
2017	(Australia) Barbara Jezeršek(2)	(Australia) Katerina Paul	(Australia) Aimee Watson
2018	(Australia) Katerina Paul (2)	(Australia) Casey Wright	(Australia) Emily Champion (Australia) Ella Jackson
2019	(Australia) Katerina Paul (3)	(Australia) Casey Wright	(United States) Jessie Diggins
2020	Not held due to the coronavirus pandemic		
2021	(Australia) Casey Wright	(Australia) Zana Evans	(Australia) Aimee Watson
2022	(Australia) Katerina Paul (4)	(Australia) Phoebe Cridland	(Australia) Zana Evans
