= 2018 FIS Cross-Country Australia/New Zealand Cup =

Discipline	Men	Women
Overall	(Australia) Phillip Bellingham	(Australia) Katerina Paul

Competition
Locations	3 venues	3 venues
Individual	7 events	7 events

The 2018 FIS Cross-Country Australia/New Zealand Cup was a season of the Australia/New Zealand Cup, a Continental Cup season in cross-country skiing for men and women. The season began on 21 July 2018 in Perisher Valley, New South Wales, Australia and concluded on 6 September 2018 in Snow Farm, New Zealand.

== Calendar ==
=== Men ===
Key: C – Classic / F – Freestyle
Race	Date	Place	Discipline	Winner	Second	Third	Ref.
1	21 July 2018	(Australia) Perisher Valley	Sprint C	(Australia) Phillip Bellingham	(Australia) Callum Watson	(Australia) Seve De Campo	
2	22 July 2018	(Australia) Perisher Valley	15 km F	(Australia) Callum Watson	(Switzerland) Valerio Leccardi	(Australia) Phillip Bellingham	
3	18 August 2018	(Australia) Falls Creek	Sprint F	(Norway) Ole Jacob Forsmo	(Australia) Callum Watson	(Australia) Liam Burton	
4	19 August 2018	(Australia) Falls Creek	10 km C	(Australia) Phillip Bellingham	(Australia) Mark Pollock	(Australia) Seve De Campo	
5	4 September 2018	(New Zealand) Snow Farm	10 km F	(United States) Kyle Bratrud	(Japan) Kaichi Naruse	(United States) Benjamin Lustgarten	
6	5 September 2018	(New Zealand) Snow Farm	Sprint M	(United States) Kevin Bolger	(United States) Benjamin Saxton	(Japan) Tomoki Sato	
7	6 September 2018	(New Zealand) Snow Farm	15 km C Mass Start	(United States) Benjamin Saxton	(United States) Adam Martin	(United States) Benjamin Lustgarten	

=== Women ===
Key: C – Classic / F – Freestyle
Race	Date	Place	Discipline	Winner	Second	Third	Ref.
1	21 July 2018	(Australia) Perisher Valley	Sprint C	(United States) Chelsea Moore	(Australia) Katerina Paul	(Australia) Darcie Morton	
2	22 July 2018	(Australia) Perisher Valley	10 km F	(Australia) Barbara Jezeršek	(Australia) Ella Jackson	(Australia) Phoebe Cridland	
3	18 August 2018	(Australia) Falls Creek	Sprint F	(Australia) Emily Champion	(Australia) Casey Wright	(Australia) Ella Jackson	
4	19 August 2018	(Australia) Falls Creek	5 km C	(Australia) Casey Wright	(France) Iris Pessey	(Australia) Katerina Paul	
5	4 September 2018	(New Zealand) Snow Farm	5 km F	(United States) Jessie Diggins	(United States) Sophie Caldwell	(United States) Caitlin Patterson	
6	5 September 2018	(New Zealand) Snow Farm	Sprint F	(United States) Sophie Caldwell	(United States) Ida Sargent	(United States) Kelsey Phinney	
7	6 September 2018	(New Zealand) Snow Farm	10 km C Mass Start	(United States) Jessie Diggins	(United States) Caitlin Patterson	(United States) Ida Sargent	

== Overall standings ==
=== Men's overall standings ===
Rank		Points
1	(Australia) Phillip Bellingham	380
2	(Australia) Callum Watson	370
3	(Australia) Mark Pollock	270
4	(Australia) Seve De Campo	241
5	(Australia) Liam Burton	240
6	(Norway) Ole Jacob Forsmo	186
7	(United States) Kyle Bratrud	185
8	(Switzerland) Valerio Leccardi	180
	(United States) Benjamin Saxton	180
10	(Japan) Kaichi Naruse	175

=== Women's overall standings ===
Rank		Points
1	(Australia) Katerina Paul	305
2	(Australia) Casey Wright	240
3	(Australia) Emily Champion	226
	(Australia) Ella Jackson	226
5	(United States) Jessie Diggins	200
	(Australia) Barbara Jezeršek	200
7	(United States) Ida Sargent	190
	(Australia) Sarah Slattery	190
9	(United States) Caitlin Patterson	185
10	(United States) Sophie Caldwell	180
