= 2019 FIS Cross-Country Australia/New Zealand Cup =

Discipline	Men	Women
Overall	(Australia) Phillip Bellingham	(Australia) Katerina Paul

Competition
Locations	3 venues	3 venues
Individual	7 events	7 events

The 2019 FIS Cross-Country Australia/New Zealand Cup was a season of the Australia/New Zealand Cup, a Continental Cup season in cross-country skiing for men and women. The season began on 27 July 2019 in Falls Creek, Victoria, Australia and concluded on 5 September 2019 in Snow Farm, New Zealand.

== Calendar ==
=== Men ===
Key: C – Classic / F – Freestyle
Race	Date	Place	Discipline	Winner	Second	Third	Ref.
1	27 July 2019	(Australia) Falls Creek	Sprint C	(Australia) Phillip Bellingham	(Australia) Seve De Campo	(Switzerland) Lauro Brändli	
2	28 July 2019	(Australia) Falls Creek	15 km F	(Australia) Phillip Bellingham	(Australia) Seve De Campo	(Australia) Callum Watson	
3	17 August 2019	(Australia) Perisher Valley	Sprint F	(Australia) Phillip Bellingham	(Switzerland) Lauro Brändli	(Australia) Seve De Campo	
4	18 August 2019	(Australia) Perisher Valley	10 km C	(Australia) Phillip Bellingham	(Australia) Seve De Campo	(Australia) Mark Pollock	
5	3 September 2019	(New Zealand) Snow Farm	Sprint C	(Japan) Hiroyuki Miyazawa	(Japan) Takanori Ebina	(Japan) Hikari Fujinoki	
6	4 September 2019	(New Zealand) Snow Farm	10 km F	(Japan) Tomoki Sato	(Japan) Hiroyuki Miyazawa	(Japan) Masato Tanaka	
7	5 September 2019	(New Zealand) Snow Farm	15 km C Mass Start	(Japan) Hiroyuki Miyazawa	(Japan) Masato Tanaka	(Japan) Hikari Fujinoki	

=== Women ===
Key: C – Classic / F – Freestyle
Race	Date	Place	Discipline	Winner	Second	Third	Ref.
1	27 July 2019	(Australia) Falls Creek	Sprint C	(Australia) Katerina Paul	(Australia) Casey Wright	(Australia) Ella Jackson	
2	28 July 2019	(Australia) Falls Creek	10 km F	(Australia) Casey Wright	(Australia) Katerina Paul	(Australia) Rosie Fordham	
3	17 August 2019	(Australia) Perisher Valley	Sprint F	(Australia) Katerina Paul	(Australia) Casey Wright	(Australia) Ella Jackson	
4	18 August 2019	(Australia) Perisher Valley	5 km C	(Australia) Casey Wright	(Australia) Katerina Paul	(Australia) Zana Evans	
5	3 September 2019	(New Zealand) Snow Farm	Sprint C	(United States) Jessie Diggins	(Australia) Katerina Paul	(Japan) Yukari Tanaka	
6	4 September 2019	(New Zealand) Snow Farm	5 km F	(United States) Jessie Diggins	(Japan) Yukari Tanaka	(United States) Julia Kern	
7	5 September 2019	(New Zealand) Snow Farm	10 km C Mass Start	(United States) Jessie Diggins	(Japan) Yukari Tanaka	(United States) Julia Kern	

== Overall standings ==
=== Men's overall standings ===
Rank		Points
1	(Australia) Phillip Bellingham	450
2	(Switzerland) Lauro Brändli	368
3	(Australia) Seve De Campo	300
4	(Japan) Hiroyuki Miyazawa	280
5	(Australia) Nicholas Blackwell	247
6	(Japan) Tomoki Sato	185
7	(Australia) Bentley Walker-Broose	180
8	(Japan) Takanori Ebina	175
9	(Japan) Masato Tanaka	172
10	(Japan) Hikari Fujinoki	170

=== Women's overall standings ===
Rank		Points
1	(Australia) Katerina Paul	541
2	(Australia) Casey Wright	420
3	(United States) Jessie Diggins	300
4	(Australia) Ella Jackson	263
5	(Australia) Sarah Slattery	256
6	(Japan) Yukari Tanaka	220
7	(Australia) Aimee Watson	180
8	(United States) Julia Kern	170
9	(Australia) Lily Murnane	165
10	(China) Dinigeer Yilamujiang	145
