= 2019–20 FIS Cross-Country Continental Cup =

Discipline	Men	Women
Alpen Cup	(France) Jean Tiberghien	(Italy) Ilaria Debertolis
Australia/New Zealand Cup	(Australia) Phillip Bellingham	(Australia) Katerina Paul
Balkan Cup	(Romania) Petrică Hogiu	(Croatia) Vedrana Malec
Eastern Europe Cup	(Russia) Ermil Vokuev	(Russia) Yevgeniya Shapovalova
Scandinavian Cup	(Norway) Gjøran Tefre	(Norway) Julie Myhre
Slavic Cup	(Poland) Mateusz Haratyk	(Poland) Magdalena Kobielusz

Competition

The 2019–20 FIS Cross-Country Continental Cup (COC) was a season of the FIS Cross-Country Continental Cup, a series of second-level cross-country skiing competitions arranged by the International Ski Federation (FIS).

The 2019–20 Continental Cup contained nine different series of geographically restricted competitions; five in Europe, two in North America and one each from Asia and Oceania.

== Winners ==
The overall winners from the 2019–20 season's Continental Cups were rewarded a right to start in the first period in the following 2020–21 World Cup season.

Cup	Abbr.	Men			Women		
Cup	Abbr.	Winner	Second	Third	Winner	Second	Third
Alpen Cup (or OPA Cup)	OPA	(France) Jean Tiberghien	(France) Jules Chappaz	(Italy) Stefano Gardener	(Italy) Ilaria Debertolis	(Italy) Sara Pellegrini	(Italy) Elisa Brocard
Australia/New Zealand Cup	ANC	(Australia) Phillip Bellingham	(Switzerland) Lauro Brändli	(Australia) Seve De Campo	(Australia) Katerina Paul	(Australia) Casey Wright	(United States) Jessie Diggins
Balkan Cup	BC	(Romania) Petrică Hogiu	(Bosnia and Herzegovina) Strahinja Erić	(Turkey) Ömer Ayçiçek	(Croatia) Vedrana Malec	(Serbia) Maida Drndić	(Serbia) Anja Ilić
Eastern Europe Cup	EEC	(Russia) Ermil Vokuev	(Russia) Alexey Vitsenko	(Russia) Artem Nikolayev	(Russia) Yevgeniya Shapovalova	(Russia) Lilia Vasilieva	(Russia) Hristina Matsokina
Far East Cup	FEC	(Japan) Hikari Fujinoki	(South Korea) Kim Min-woo	(South Korea) Lee Geon-yong	(South Korea) Lee Chae-won	(South Korea) Lee Eui-jin	(South Korea) Je Sang-mi
Nor-Am Cup	NAC	(Canada) Antoine Cyr	(Canada) Evan Palmer-Charrette	(Spain) Ricardo Izquierdo-Bernier	(Canada) Katherine Stewart-Jones	(Canada) Cendrine Browne	(Canada) Laura Leclair
Scandinavian Cup	SCAN	(Norway) Gjøran Tefre	(Norway) Johan Hoel	(Norway) Harald Østberg Amundsen	(Norway) Julie Myhre	(Sweden) Linn Sömskar	(Sweden) Maria Nordström
Slavic Cup	SC	(Poland) Mateusz Haratyk	(Poland) Kacper Antolec	(Slovakia) Peter Mlynár	(Poland) Magdalena Kobielusz	(Slovakia) Barbora Klementová	(Poland) Karolina Kaleta (Slovakia) Kristína Sivoková
US SuperTour	UST	(United States) Gus Schumacher	(United States) Benjamin Lustgarten	(United States) Adam Martin	(United States) Kaitlynn Miller	(United States) Erika Flowers	(United States) Alayna Sonnesyn

== Sources ==
"RULES FOR THE FIS CROSS-COUNTRY CONTINENTAL CUP" (PDF). fis-ski.com. International Ski Federation.
