= Australia at the 2014 Winter Olympics =

- IOC code: AUS
- NOC: Australian Olympic Committee
- Website: www.olympics.com.au

in Sochi
- Competitors: 60 in 11 sports
- Flag bearers: Alex Pullin (opening); David Morris (closing)
- Medals Ranked 24th: Gold 0 Silver 2 Bronze 1 Total 3

Winter Olympics appearances (overview)
- 1936; 1948; 1952; 1956; 1960; 1964; 1968; 1972; 1976; 1980; 1984; 1988; 1992; 1994; 1998; 2002; 2006; 2010; 2014; 2018; 2022; 2026

Australia competed at the 2014 Winter Olympics in Sochi, Russia, from 7 to 23 February 2014. Australia's team consisted of 60 athletes competing in 11 sports, which represented the largest Winter Olympics team the country had ever sent.

== Medalists ==
Medal	Name	Sport	Event	Date
Silver	Torah Bright	Snowboarding	Women's halfpipe	12 February
Silver	David Morris	Freestyle skiing	Men's aerials	17 February
Bronze	Lydia Lassila	Freestyle skiing	Women's aerials	14 February

Medals by sport
Sport	1st place, gold medalist(s)	2nd place, silver medalist(s)	3rd place, bronze medalist(s)	Total
Freestyle skiing	0	1	1	2
Snowboarding	0	1	0	1
Total	0	2	1	3

== Alpine skiing ==
Australia had five athletes in qualification position.

Athlete	Event	Run 1		Run 2		Total	
Athlete	Event	Time	Rank	Time	Rank	Time	Rank
Dominic Demschar	Men's giant slalom	1:26.47	42	1:27.30	38	2:53.77	39
Dominic Demschar	Men's slalom	58.52	66	DNF			
Ross Peraudo	Men's giant slalom	1:29.07	50	DNF			
Ross Peraudo	Men's slalom	DNF					
Emily Bamford	Women's giant slalom	1:28.57	56	1:27.23	49	2:55.80	50
Emily Bamford	Women's slalom	1:02.13	41	DNF			
Lavinia Chrystal	Women's giant slalom	1:25.18	46	1:23.39	39	2:48.57	40
Lavinia Chrystal	Women's slalom	59.74	34	58.16	33	1:57.90	32
Greta Small	Women's combined	1:47.99	29	52.31	12	2:40.30	15
Greta Small	Women's downhill	—N/a				1:44.79	29
Greta Small	Women's giant slalom	1:25.22	47	1:24.44	42	2:49.66	41
Greta Small	Women's slalom	1:01.19	40	56.41	28	1:57.60	31
Greta Small	Women's super-G	—N/a				DNF	

== Biathlon ==
Australia was awarded quota spots in biathlon after higher-placed nations decided to forgo their athlete allocations. The full list of biathlon team was announced on 24 January 2014.

Athlete	Event	Time	Misses	Rank
Alexei Almoukov	Men's sprint	27:24.6	2 (0+2)	73
Alexei Almoukov	Men's individual	54:35.4	2 (0+0+0+2)	45
Lucy Glanville	Women's sprint	26:57.1	2 (0+2)	82
Lucy Glanville	Women's individual	1:01:00.7	4 (1+0+1+2)	78

== Bobsleigh ==
Australia had one sled in each of the three events for a total of 6 athletes. Bobsleigh rider Jana Pittman made history for Australia as she became the nation's first female athlete to compete in both Summer and Winter Olympics. She previously competed as a sprinter in track and field at the 2000 and 2004 Summer Olympics.

Athlete	Event	Run 1		Run 2		Run 3		Run 4		Total	
Athlete	Event	Time	Rank	Time	Rank	Time	Rank	Time	Rank	Time	Rank
Duncan Harvey; Heath Spence*	Two-man	57.96	28	57.99	26	57.78	25	Did not advance		2:53.73	26
Duncan Harvey; Lucas Mata; Gareth Nichols; Heath Spence*	Four-man	56.20	20	56.21	21	56.23	19	Did not advance		2:48.64	20
Jana Pittman; Astrid Radjenovic*	Two-woman	58.62	15	58.50	13	59.06	15	58.37	8	3:54.55	14

* – Denotes the driver of each sled

== Cross-country skiing ==
Australia had four athletes in qualification position.

Distance

Athlete	Event	Classical		Freestyle		Final		
Athlete	Event	Time	Rank	Time	Rank	Time	Deficit	Rank
Phil Bellingham	Men's 15 km classical	—N/a				46:16.4	+7:46.7	76
Callum Watson	Men's 15 km classical	—N/a				45:46.5	+7:16.8	75
Callum Watson	Men's 30 km skiathlon	40:09.8	62	36:21.6	59	1:17:00.4	+8:45.0	60
Esther Bottomley	Women's 10 km classical	—N/a				34:30.1	+6:12.3	58
Aimee Watson	Women's 10 km classical	—N/a				34:56.0	+6:38.2	60
Aimee Watson	Women's 30 km freestyle	—N/a				1:34:00.1	+22:54.9	54

Sprint

Athlete	Event	Qualification		Quarterfinal		Semifinal		Final	
Athlete	Event	Time	Rank	Time	Rank	Time	Rank	Time	Rank
Phil Bellingham	Men's sprint	3:45.65	55	Did not advance					
Callum Watson	Men's sprint	5:29.62	85	Did not advance					
Phil Bellingham; Callum Watson	Men's team sprint	—N/a				25:54.31	12	Did not advance	
Esther Bottomley	Women's sprint	2:50.54	56	Did not advance					

== Figure skating ==
Australia had achieved three quota places: Australian skater Chantelle Kerry appealed to the Court of Arbitration for Sport asking that Brooklee Han should not be able to represent Australia, because she did not have federation approval. This appeal was rejected.

Athlete	Event	SP/OD		FS/FD		Total	
Athlete	Event	Points	Rank	Points	Rank	Points	Rank
Brendan Kerry	Men's singles	47.12	29	Did not advance			
Brooklee Han	Ladies' singles	49.32	22 Q	94.52	18	143.84	20
Danielle O'Brien / Gregory Merriman	Ice dancing	52.68	20 Q	75.85	20	128.53	20

== Freestyle skiing ==
Australia had eighteen athletes in qualification position. The full list of Australian freestyle skiers was officially named on 22 January 2014.

Aerials

Athlete	Event	Qualification				Final					
Athlete	Event	Jump 1		Jump 2		Jump 1		Jump 2		Jump 3	
Athlete	Event	Points	Rank	Points	Rank	Points	Rank	Points	Rank	Points	Rank
David Morris	Men's aerials	118.59	2 Q	Bye		101.87	8 Q	115.05	4 Q	110.41	2nd place, silver medalist(s)
Lydia Lassila	Women's aerials	66.12	15	90.65	1 Q	95.76	2 Q	99.22	2 Q	72.12	3rd place, bronze medalist(s)
Laura Peel	Women's aerials	67.68	13	85.99	3 Q	83.79	5 Q	64.50	7	Did not advance	
Danielle Scott	Women's aerials	85.36	3 Q	Bye		76.23	9	Did not advance			
Samantha Wells	Women's aerials	78.12	7	57.13	12	Did not advance					

Halfpipe

Athlete	Event	Qualification				Final			
Athlete	Event	Run 1	Run 2	Best	Rank	Run 1	Run 2	Best	Rank
Amy Sheehan	Women's halfpipe	19.60	70.60	70.60	12 Q	15.00	40.60	40.60	10
Davina Williams	Women's halfpipe	5.40	63.00	63.00	15	Did not advance			

Moguls

Athlete	Event	Qualification								Final											
Athlete	Event	Run 1				Run 2				Run 1				Run 2				Run 3			
Athlete	Event	Time	Points	Total	Rank	Time	Points	Total	Rank	Time	Points	Total	Rank	Time	Points	Total	Rank	Time	Points	Total	Rank
Dale Begg-Smith	Men's moguls	25.06	13.56	19.74	19	28.39	5.04	9.65	15	Did not advance											
Matt Graham	Men's moguls	24.36	15.02	21.53	10 Q	Bye				24.85	16.21	22.49	7 Q	25.08	17.14	23.31	7	Did not advance			
Sam Hall	Men's moguls	24.52	12.35	18.79	21	27.54	6.49	11.50	14	Did not advance											
Brodie Summers	Men's moguls	25.73	15.69	21.56	9 Q	Bye				25.73	15.91	21.78	13	Did not advance							
Britteny Cox	Women's moguls	31.74	14.84	20.19	12	31.48	10.1	19.93	4 Q	30.87	15.18	20.88	8 Q	30.73	15.84	21.59	4 Q	31.19	13.86	19.43	5
Taylah O'Neill	Women's moguls	33.14	13.78	18.57	16	33.39	9.4	17.81	7 Q	33.03	13.34	18.18	16	Did not advance							
Nicole Parks	Women's moguls	31.45	13.02	18.49	17	32.65	8.7	17.77	8 Q	32.05	13.14	18.37	15	Did not advance							

Ski cross

Athlete	Event	Seeding		Round of 16	Quarterfinal	Semifinal	Final	
Athlete	Event	Time	Rank	Position	Position	Position	Position	Rank
Anton Grimus	Men's ski cross	1:16.82	5	DNF	Did not advance			25
Scott Kneller	Men's ski cross	1:18.58	24	3	Did not advance			23
Katya Crema	Women's ski cross	1:23.47	11	2 Q	1 Q	3 FB	3	7
Sami Kennedy-Sim	Women's ski cross	1:38.51	25	DNF	Did not advance			28
Jenny Owens	Women's ski cross	1:59.84	26	2 Q	3	Did not advance		12

Qualification legend: FA – Qualify to medal round; FB – Qualify to consolation round

Slopestyle

Athlete	Event	Qualification				Final			
Athlete	Event	Run 1	Run 2	Best	Rank	Run 1	Run 2	Best	Rank
Russ Henshaw	Men's slopestyle	84.60	83.40	84.60	5 Q	80.40	28.80	80.40	8
Anna Segal	Women's slopestyle	75.40	78.80	78.80	7 Q	77.00	28.80	77.00	4

== Luge ==
Australia qualified a place in the men's singles when Alex Ferlazzo finished in the top 38 (with a maximum of three per nation qualifying) during the 2013–14 Luge World Cup.

Athlete	Event	Run 1		Run 2		Run 3		Run 4		Total	
Athlete	Event	Time	Rank	Time	Rank	Time	Rank	Time	Rank	Time	Rank
Alex Ferlazzo	Men's singles	53.528	29	53.686	34	53.323	33	53.507	35	3:34.044	33

== Short track speed skating ==
Based on their performance at World Cup 3 and 4 in November 2013, Australia qualified 1 man (500 m) and 1 woman (1000 m, 1500 m). Pierre Boda qualified to be Australia's male representative by beating Andy Jung in a three race series. Deanna Lockett represented the women.

Men

Athlete	Event	Heat		Quarterfinal		Semifinal		Final	
Athlete	Event	Time	Rank	Time	Rank	Time	Rank	Time	Rank
Pierre Boda	500 m	42.702	4	Did not advance					30

Women

Athlete	Event	Heat		Quarterfinal		Semifinal		Final	
Athlete	Event	Time	Rank	Time	Rank	Time	Rank	Time	Rank
Deanna Lockett	1000 m	1:34.845	1 Q	1:29.256	3	Did not advance			9
Deanna Lockett	1500 m	2:25.140	5	—N/a		Did not advance			26

Qualification legend: ADV – Advanced due to being impeded by another skater; FA – Qualify to medal round; FB – Qualify to consolation round

== Skeleton ==
Australia had one sled in the men's event and two in the women's for a total of 3 athletes.

Athlete	Event	Run 1		Run 2		Run 3		Run 4		Total	
Athlete	Event	Time	Rank	Time	Rank	Time	Rank	Time	Rank	Time	Rank
John Farrow	Men's	57.84	19	57.73	19	57.75	16	57.35	16	3:50.67	17
Lucy Chaffer	Women's	1:00.16	20	59.25	10	58.74	=13	58.49	9	3:56.64	17
Michelle Steele	Women's	59.42	10	59.41	14	58.76	15	58.69	16	3:56.28	=14

== Snowboarding ==
Australia had thirteen athletes in qualification position.

Freestyle
Men

Athlete	Event	Qualification				Semifinal				Final			
Athlete	Event	Run 1	Run 2	Best	Rank	Run 1	Run 2	Best	Rank	Run 1	Run 2	Best	Rank
Kent Callister	Halfpipe	87.00	25.50	87.00	6 QS	49.25	79.50	79.50	3 Q	40.00	68.50	68.50	9
Scott James	Halfpipe	68.50	15.00	68.50	10	Did not advance							
Nathan Johnstone	Halfpipe	86.00	27.50	86.00	7 QS	25.75	73.50	73.50	7	Did not advance			
Scott James	Slopestyle	36.00	44.00	44.00	11 QS	77.25	19.00	77.25	8	Did not advance			

Qualification Legend: QF – Qualify directly to final; QS – Qualify to semifinal

Women

Athlete	Event	Qualification				Semifinal				Final			
Athlete	Event	Run 1	Run 2	Best	Rank	Run 1	Run 2	Best	Rank	Run 1	Run 2	Best	Rank
Torah Bright	Halfpipe	93.00	28.75	93.00	1 QF	Bye				58.25	91.50	91.50	2nd place, silver medalist(s)
Holly Crawford	Halfpipe	43.00	33.75	43.00	14	Did not advance							
Stephanie Magiros	Halfpipe	27.25	57.25	57.25	9 QS	26.50	20.50	26.50	12	Did not advance			
Hannah Trigger	Halfpipe	51.25	33.00	51.25	10	Did not advance							
Torah Bright	Slopestyle	85.25	80.00	85.25	2 QF	Bye				64.75	66.25	66.25	7

Qualification Legend: QF – Qualify directly to final; QS – Qualify to semifinal

Snowboard cross

Athlete	Event	Seeding		1/8 Final	Quarterfinal	Semifinal	Final	
Athlete	Event	Time	Rank	Position	Position	Position	Position	Rank
Cam Bolton	Men's snowboard cross	CAN		1 Q	1 Q	4 FB	DNF	11
Jarryd Hughes	Men's snowboard cross	CAN		3 Q	5	Did not advance		=17
Alex Pullin	Men's snowboard cross	CAN		1 Q	4	Did not advance		=13
Torah Bright	Women's snowboard cross	1:23.96	15	—N/a	5	Did not advance		18
Belle Brockhoff	Women's snowboard cross	1:23.22	7	—N/a	3 Q	5 FB	2	8

Qualification legend: FA – Qualify to medal final; FB – Qualify to consolation final

== Speed skating ==
Men

Athlete	Event	Race 1		Race 2		Final	
Athlete	Event	Time	Rank	Time	Rank	Time	Rank
Daniel Greig	500 m	1:20.55	40	35.29	17	1:55.84	39
Daniel Greig	1000 m	—N/a				1:10.13	22
