= Snow Park =

Snow Park may refer to:

- Snowpark, a terrain park for freestyle skiing or snow-boarding
- Snow Park, New Zealand, a skifield near Wānaka, New Zealand
