= Southern Hemisphere Proving Grounds =

Vehicle testing facility

Southern Hemisphere Proving Ground
- Logo

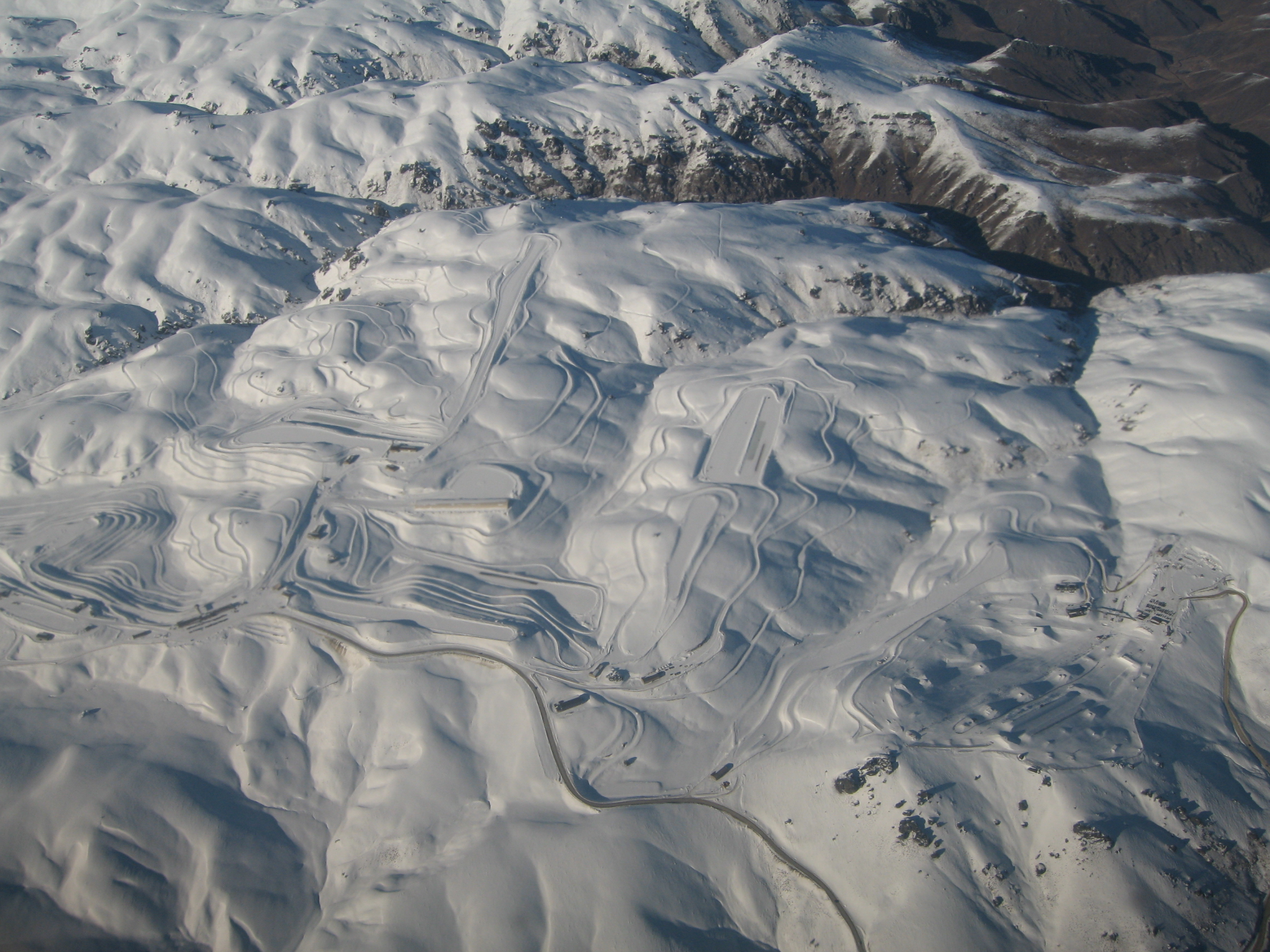
- The Southern Hemisphere Proving Grounds next to Snow Farm.
- Company type: Privately held company
- Industry: Automotive proof testing
- Founded: 1990; 35 years ago
- Headquarters: Wānaka, New Zealand
- Parent: Gould Holdings Ltd

Map

Southern Hemisphere Proving Grounds (SHPG) is an international automotive proving facility based in New Zealand's Cardrona area. It is the only one of its kind in the Southern Hemisphere, with its second operation undergoing development in southern Patagonia, Argentina. It covers 400ha of private land and usually operates during southern winter months. Global car manufacturers seek to test new models during the Northern Hemisphere summer. SHPG was established in the early 1990s, after Japanese motor companies Toyota and Sumitomo began inquiring for a suitable site for testing new engines and tyres in the southern snow. The facility operates under strict discretion for other clients and employs efforts to keep out of the public eye.

SHPG also borders the Snow Farm, a cross-country ski resort. In 2013, SHPG bought neighbouring snowsports terrain park Snow Park NZ, which had for several years been financially struggling, and developed it into its after market ice driving event centre.
