= Snow Park, New Zealand =

Snow park in New Zealand

Coordinates: 44.878°S 169.07°E

Snow Park
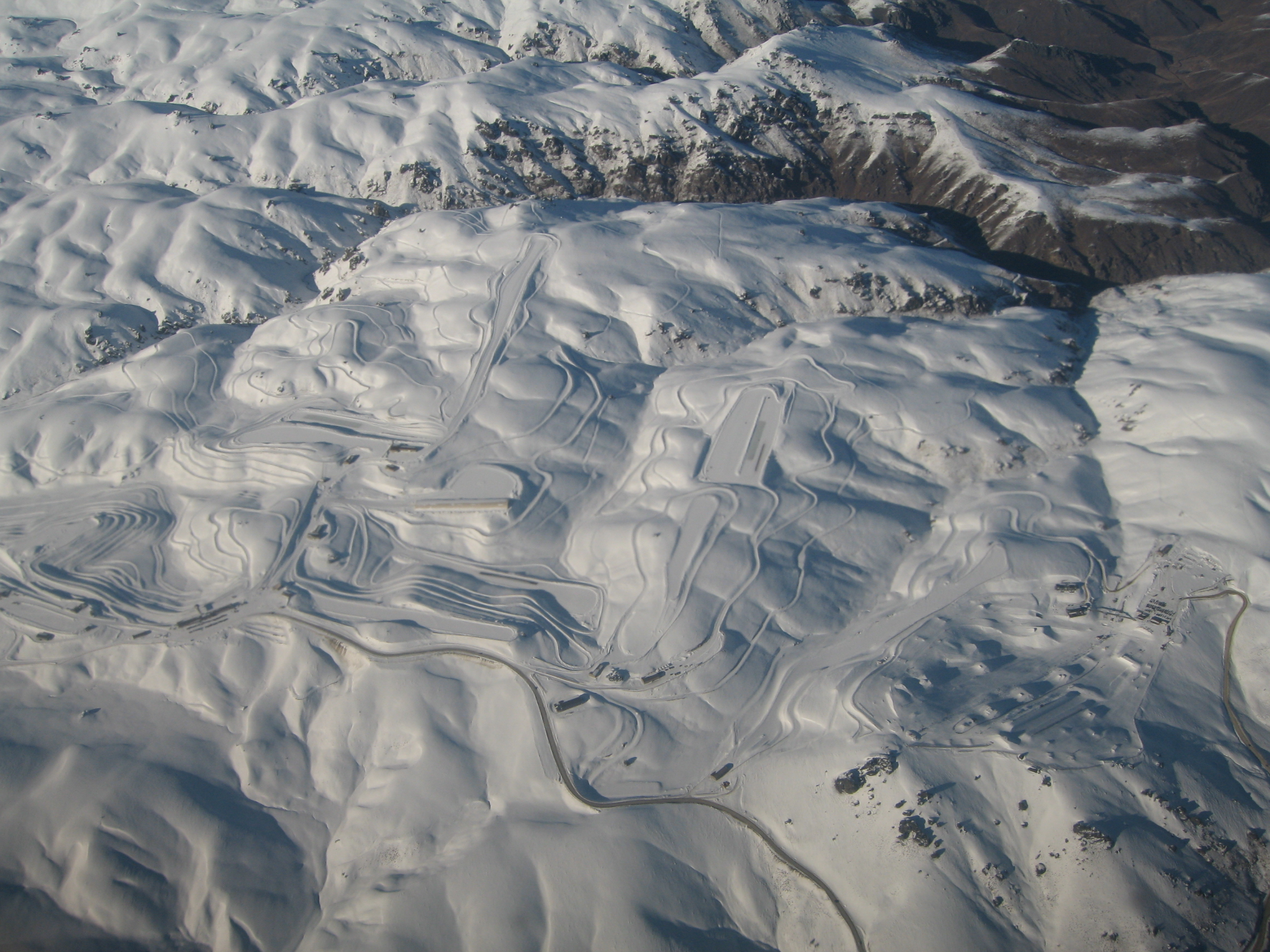
- Interactive map of Snow Park
- Location: Otago, NZ
- Nearest city: Wānaka
- Top elevation: 1,530 m (5,020 ft)
- Skiable area: 60 ha (150 acres)
- Lift system: One quad
- Snowfall: 50 cm (20 in)
- Snowmaking: 100%
- Website: http://www.snowparknz.com http://www.dirtparknz.com

Snow Park was a dedicated snowsports terrain park in the South Island of New Zealand. It described itself as the "first dedicated freestyle terrain park in the world" when it opened in 2002, and featured a number of half-pipes, jumps and rails, instead of traditional ski runs. It closed in 2013 and was sold to the neighbouring Southern Hemisphere Proving Grounds, a vehicle testing facility.

On-mountain accommodation was available after 2006, prior to which people needed to commute daily from Wānaka or Queenstown. The site shared an access road with nearby Snow Farm.

The park and surrounding land was owned by the Lee family for sixty years, before it was put up for sale in September 2008, for $30 million.
