= Katya Crema =

Australian freestyle skier

Personal information
- Nickname: Kat
- Nationality: Australian
- Born: 2 August 1988 (age 38) Melbourne, Victoria, Australia
- Height: 174 cm (5 ft 9 in) (2014)
- Weight: 64 kg (141 lb) (2014)

Sport
- Country: Australia
- Sport: Skiing
- Club: Mount Buller Race Club
- Coached by: Matt Lyon

Achievements and titles
- Olympic finals: 2010 Winter Olympics, 2014 Winter Olympics
Medal record
New Zealand Winter Games
| Silver medal – second place | 2011 Cardrona | Ski Cross |

Katya Crema (/ˈkrɛmə/ KREM-ə; born 2 August 1988), often simply known as Kat, is an Australian alpine and ski cross skier from Melbourne. Competing at the 2010 Winter Olympics, she finished fifteenth. Crema has also skied on the Winter X-Games circuit, making her debut in 2010.

== Personal ==
Crema was born on 2 August 1988 in Melbourne, Victoria.

She is 5.75 feet (1.75 metres) tall and weighs 132 pounds (60 kilograms). Her father was born in Italy but immigrated to Victoria where he went into construction. From 2008, she attended the University of Melbourne, where she studied towards a Bachelor of Environments majoring architecture. She is subsequently completing a Masters of Property.

== Skiing ==
Crema has been affiliated with the Australian Institute of Sport (AIS), the New South Wales Institute of Sport (NSWIS) and the Victorian Institute of Sport (VIS). She is coached by Matthew Lyons. Her scholarship with the AIS started on 1 July 2008. While at university, she held a High Performance Scholarship for skiing. Her skiing is sponsored by Rip Curl, POC, Komperdell, and Stoekli. Crema is a member of the Mount Buller Race Club. She originally did alpine skiing but switched to ski cross when she was nineteen years old; during the 2007/2008 ski season.

When actively training off the snow, she may do 10 to 12 training sessions a week. When training on the snow, her on snow training sessions may last up to four hours each with up to six sessions a week. She competed in the 2007 World Junior Alpine Championships held in Flachau, Austria. She competed in the 2009 Freestyle World Championships held in Inawashiro, Japan. Crema competed in the 2009 World Junior Alpine Championships held in Fomigal, Spain. In 2009, she trained with skier Jenny Owens. In January 2010, she finished in 10th position at the Lake Placid World Cup.

Crema participated in the 2010 Vancouver Games in the first Olympic women's ski-cross event, where she finished 15th, being one of two Australian women to compete in this event. She made her Winter X-Games debut in 2010. In 2011, she participated in the AUC Snow Sports competition. She competed in the 2011 Freestyle World Championships in Deer Valley, where she finished 17th. In 2011, her best result was first at the Mount Hotham hosted Australian New Zealand Cup. She competed at the 2012 Les Contamines in France where she finished 7th.

She competed for Australia at the 2014 Winter Olympics in the ski cross events where she finished 7th.

=== Performances ===
| Race date | Competition | Discipline | Place | Country | Position | Points | Reference |
| 29 August 1999 | Australian New Zealand Cup | Dual moguls | Mount Buller | Australia | 17 | | |
| 29 August 1999 | Australian New Zealand Cup | Moguls | Mount Buller | Australia | 18 | | |
| 12 January 2008 | World Cup | Ski Cross | Les Contamines | France | 18 | 130 | |
| 20 January 2008 | World Cup | Ski Cross | Kreischberg | Austria | 14 | 180 | |
| 26 January 2008 | Europa Cup | Ski Cross | Zweisimmen | Switzerland | 12 | 48.4 | |
| 22 February 2008 | World Cup | Ski Cross | Sierra Nevada | Spain | 11 | 240 | |
| 6 March 2008 | World Cup | Ski Cross | Grindelwald | Switzerland | 21 | 100 | |
| 6 February 2009 | World Cup | Ski Cross | Cypress Mountain | Canada | DNS | | |
| 19 February 2009 | World Cup | Ski Cross | Myrkdalen-Voss | Norway | 33 | 24 | |
| 24 February 2009 | World Cup | Ski Cross | Branas | Sweden | 27 | 45 | |
| 2 March 2009 | World Ski Championships | Ski Cross | Inawashiro | Japan | 26 | 50 | |
| 12 March 2009 | World Cup | Ski Cross | Grindelwald | Switzerland | 32 | 26 | |
| 14 March 2009 | World Cup | Ski Cross | Meiringen-Hasliberg | Switzerland | 40 | 18.5 | |
| 22 August 2009 | Australian New Zealand Cup | Ski Cross | Mount Hotham | Australia | 6 | 88 | |
| 23 August 2009 | Australian New Zealand Cup | Ski Cross | Mount Hotham | Australia | 5 | 90 | |
| 13 December 2009 | Europa Cup | Ski Cross | Geilo | Norway | 14 | 90 | |
| 21 December 2009 | World Cup | Ski Cross | Innichen/San Candido | Italy | 34 | 22 | |
| 22 December 2009 | World Cup | Ski Cross | Innichen/San Candido | Italy | 32 | 26 | |
| 5 January 2010 | World Cup | Ski Cross | St. Johann (Tirol) | Austria | 28 | 40 | |
| 9 January 2010 | World Cup | Ski Cross | Les Contamines | France | 29 | 36 | |
| 13 January 2010 | World Cup | Ski Cross | Alpe d Huez | France | 23 | 80 | |
| 20 January 2010 | World Cup | Ski Cross | Blue Mountain | Canada | 25 | 60 | |
| 24 January 2010 | World Cup | Ski Cross | Lake Placid | United States | 10 | 260 | |
| 23 February 2010 | Olympic Winter Games | Ski Cross | Cypress Mountain | Canada | 15 | 160 | |
| 6 March 2010 | World Cup | Ski Cross | Branas | Sweden | DNS | | |
| 12 March 2010 | World Cup | Ski Cross | Grindelwald | Switzerland | 18 | 130 | |
| 14 March 2010 | World Cup | Ski Cross | Meiringen-Hasliberg | Switzerland | 25 | 60 | |
| 21 August 2010 | Australian New Zealand Cup | Ski Cross | Mount Hotham | Australia | 1 | 180 | |
| 22 August 2010 | Australian New Zealand Cup | Ski Cross | Mount Hotham | Australia | 2 | 144 | |
| 11 December 2010 | Europa Cup | Ski Cross | Jerzens | Austria | 11 | 120 | |
| 18 December 2010 | World Cup | Ski Cross | Innichen/San Candido | Italy | 23 | 80 | |
| 19 December 2010 | World Cup | Ski Cross | Innichen/San Candido | Italy | 25 | 60 | |
| 7 January 2011 | World Cup | Ski Cross | St. Johann (Tirol) | Austria | 23 | 80 | |
| 12 January 2011 | World Cup | Ski Cross | Alpe d Huez | France | 18 | 130 | |
| 16 January 2011 | World Cup | Ski Cross | Les Contamines | France | 17 | 140 | |
| 22 January 2011 | Europa Cup | Ski Cross | Zweisimmen | Switzerland | 7 | 144 | |
| 29 January 2011 | World Cup | Ski Cross | Grasgehren | Germany | 13 | 200 | |
| 4 February 2011 | World Ski Championships | Ski Cross | Deer Valley | United States | 17 | 140 | |
| 11 February 2011 | World Cup | Ski Cross | Blue Mountain | Canada | 13 | 200 | |
| 27 February 2011 | National Championships | Ski Cross | Mittenwald | Germany | 11 | 86.4 | |
| 3 March 2011 | World Cup | Ski Cross | Grindelwald | Switzerland | 13 | 200 | |
| 6 March 2011 | World Cup | Ski Cross | Meiringen-Hasliberg | Switzerland | 17 | 140 | |
| 13 March 2011 | World Cup | Ski Cross | Branas | Sweden | 14 | 180 | |
| 19 March 2011 | World Cup | Ski Cross | Myrkdalen-Voss | Norway | 15 | 160 | |
| 21 August 2011 | Australian New Zealand Cup | Ski Cross | Mount Hotham | Australia | 1 | 260 | |
| 22 August 2011 | Australian New Zealand Cup | Ski Cross | Mount Hotham | Australia | 2 | 192 | |
| 26 August 2011 | Australian New Zealand Cup | Ski Cross | Cardrona | New Zealand | 2 | 232 | |
| 17 December 2011 | World Cup | Ski Cross | Innichen/San Candido | Italy | 28 | 40 | |
| 18 December 2011 | World Cup | Ski Cross | Innichen/San Candido | Italy | 22 | 90 | |
| 7 January 2012 | World Cup | Ski Cross | St. Johann (Tirol) | Austria | 18 | 130 | |
| 11 January 2012 | World Cup | Ski Cross | Alpe d Huez | France | 22 | 90 | |
| 15 January 2012 | World Cup | Ski Cross | Les Contamines | France | 7 | 360 | |
| 3 February 2012 | World Cup | Ski Cross | Blue Mountain | Canada | 11 | 240 | |
| 25 February 2012 | World Cup | Ski Cross | Bischofswiesen/Goetschen | Germany | 18 | 130 | |
| 26 February 2012 | World Cup | Ski Cross | Bischofswiesen/Goetschen | Germany | 10 | 260 | |
| 3 March 2012 | World Cup | Ski Cross | Branas | Sweden | 15 | 160 | |
| 10 March 2012 | World Cup | Ski Cross | Grindelwald | Switzerland | 15 | 160 | |
| 18 August 2012 | Australian New Zealand Cup | Ski Cross | Mount Hotham | Australia | 2 | 232 | |
| 19 August 2012 | Australian New Zealand Cup | Ski Cross | Mount Hotham | Australia | 1 | 290 | |
