= Emily Bamford =

Australian alpine skier (born 1992)

Personal information
- Born: 11 March 1992 (age 34) Melbourne, Victoria, Australia
- Height: 5 ft 7 in (170 cm)
- Weight: 64 kg (141 lb)

Emily Bamford (born 11 March 1992) is an Australian alpine skier. She competed for Australia at the 2014 Winter Olympics in the alpine skiing events. Bamford spent most of her life in Doreen, Victoria. She is the daughter of Australian businessman and horse-racing tycoon Kevin Bamford. Growing up on a horse racing farm led her to compete in equestrian events and competed in dressage, showjumping, and eventing at a state level. On weekends she would visit Mt Buller to ski with her family and joined the Mt. Buller Racing Club at the age of nine. At 16 Bamford had to choose between continuing to compete in equestrian or skiing. She gave up equestrian to pursue competitive skiing and moved to Stratton Mountain in Vermont USA to attend Stratton Mountain School, a college-preparatory boarding school which focuses on winter sports. Bamford represented Australia in the Junior World Championships of 2009, 2011 and 2012. At 21, she made her Olympic debut in Alpine Skiing at the Sochi 2014 Olympic Winter Games. She placed 50th in the Giant Slalom event and did not finish the Slalom. Bamford attended Bates College in Lewiston, Maine and graduated in 2015.
