= Death-Scort Service =

- Directed by: Sean Donohue
- Written by: Sean Donohue; Chris Woods
- Produced by: Sean Donohue; Shelby McIntyre; John Miller; Chris Woods
- Starring: Krystal Pixie Adams; Ashley Lynn Caputo; Sean Donohue
- Cinematography: Chris Woods
- Edited by: Chris Woods
- Music by: Toshiyuki Hiraoka
- Release date: October 13, 2015
- Running time: 79 minutes
- Country: United States
- Language: English

Death-Scort Service is a 2015 independent horror film that was directed by Sean Donohue, who co-wrote the script with Chris Woods. Funding for the movie was partially raised through an Indiegogo campaign and Death-Scourt Service released on October 13, 2015.

== Synopsis ==
The film follows a group of prostitutes working in Las Vegas that become the focus of a serial killer intent on brutally murdering them all.

== Cast ==
- Krystal Pixie Adams as Michelle
- Amethist Young as Gwen
- Ashley Lynn Caputo as Missy
- Sean Donohue as John #1/Strip Club Patron #1
- Cayt Feinics as Jamie
- Bob Glazier as Buddy
- Lisa Marie Kart as Beverly
- Joe Makowski as Mysterious Driver
- Jessica Morgan as Tara
- Bailey Paige as Erica
- Alice Reigns as Julie
- Evan Stone as T.V. Personality
- Paula Tsurara as Candy
- Amanda Welch as Dakota
- Geneva Whitmore as Pamela
- Chris Woods as John #2/Strip Club Patron #2

== Reception ==
Shock Till You Drop criticized the film for its poor acting and plot, but also remarked that it also "functions primarily as an attempt to keep the carnival-scumbag vibe of vintage H.G. Lewis, David Friedman and Doris Wishman alive and well" and that appreciated these aspects of Death-Scourt Service. HorrorNews.net wrote a mostly favorable review for the movie, stating "At the end of the day, there's absolutely nothing about Death-Scort Service that's subtle; it hits you repeatedly about the head and neck until the final credits roll. Sometimes it's with nudity, sometimes it's with violence. Occasionally, you get both. Again, that's definitely not a complaint. I found myself enjoying the flick even when I felt dirty, which, I guess, is a compliment. Donohue and company know their audience is filled with filthy freaks, and they're more than happy to supply our demand."
