= Taylah O'Neill =

Australian freestyle skier

Personal information
- Born: 11 November 1994 (age 31) Darlinghurst, New South Wales, Australia
- Height: 5 ft 3 in (160 cm)
- Weight: 126 lb (57 kg)

Sport
- Country: Australia
- Sport: Freestyle skiing

Taylah O'Neill (born 11 November 1994) is an Australian freestyle skier. She was born in Darlinghurst. She competed at the 2014 Winter Olympics in Sochi in women's moguls.
