= Natascia Leonardi Cortesi =

Swiss cross-country skier and ski mountaineer

Personal information
- Nationality: Switzerland
- Born: 1 May 1971 (age 55) Faido, Switzerland

Sport
- Sport: Skiing
- Club: SC Bedretto

World Cup career
- Seasons: 15 – (1992, 1994–2007)
- Indiv. starts: 73
- Indiv. podiums: 0
- Team starts: 22
- Team podiums: 0
- Overall titles: 0 – (56th in 2000)
- Discipline titles: 0
Medal record
Representing Switzerland
Women's cross-country skiing
Olympic Games
| Bronze medal – third place | 2002 Salt Lake City | 4 × 5 km relay |
Junior World Championships
| Bronze medal – third place | 1990 Les Saisies | 4 × 5 km relay |
Women's ski mountaineering
World Championships
| Gold medal – first place | 2006 Cuneo | Vertical race |

Natascia Leonardi Cortesi (born 1 May 1971) is a Swiss cross-country skier and ski mountaineer who has competed since 1988 in the World Cup circuit. She won a bronze medal in the 4 × 5 km relay at the 2002 Winter Olympics in Salt Lake City and had her best individual finish with a tenth place in the 30 km event at those same games. This was the first Olympic medal ever for a Swiss woman in cross-country skiing. Leonardi Cortesi's best score at the FIS Nordic World Ski Championships was a fifth place in the 4 × 5 km relay in 1999.

In Ski mountaineering, she won 2005 the Trofeo Mezzalama with Gloriana Pellisier and Christiane Nex. 2006 she was vertical race world champion.

At the Worldloppet she won three times her home-race, the Engadin Skimarathon in 2003, 2005 and 2006. She was the first Swiss woman to win the Kangaroo Hoppet 2006 in Australia and 2011 the Transjurassienne in France.

== Cross-country skiing results ==
All results are sourced from the International Ski Federation (FIS).

=== Olympic Games ===
- 1 medal – (1 bronze)

| Year | Age | 5 km | 10 km | 15 km | Pursuit | 30 km | Sprint | 4 × 5 km relay | Team sprint |
|---|---|---|---|---|---|---|---|---|---|
| 1992 | 20 | — | —N/a | 25 | — | 31 | —N/a | 9 | —N/a |
| 1998 | 26 | — | —N/a | DNS | — | 24 | —N/a | 4 | —N/a |
| 2002 | 30 | —N/a | 15 | 15 | — | 10 | — | Bronze | —N/a |
| 2006 | 34 | —N/a | — | —N/a | 24 | 16 | — | 11 | — |

=== World Championships ===
| Year | Age | 5 km | 10 km | 15 km | Pursuit | 30 km | Sprint | 4 × 5 km relay | Team sprint |
|---|---|---|---|---|---|---|---|---|---|
| 1991 | 19 | 49 | — | 43 | —N/a | — | —N/a | — | —N/a |
| 1997 | 25 | 59 | —N/a | 42 | DNF | 31 | —N/a | 8 | —N/a |
| 1999 | 27 | — | —N/a | 28 | — | 27 | —N/a | 5 | —N/a |
| 2001 | 29 | —N/a | — | 20 | — | CNX^{[a]} | — | 7 | —N/a |
| 2003 | 31 | —N/a | 34 | 28 | — | 23 | — | 10 | —N/a |
| 2005 | 33 | —N/a | 16 | —N/a | — | 23 | — | 11 | — |
| 2007 | 35 | —N/a | 54 | —N/a | — | — | — | — | — |

a. ^{1} Cancelled due to extremely cold weather.

=== World Cup ===
==== Season standings ====
| Season | Age | Discipline standings | | | | | Ski Tour standings |
| Season | Age | Overall | Distance | Long Distance | Middle Distance | Sprint | Tour de Ski |
|---|---|---|---|---|---|---|---|
| 1992 | 20 | NC | —N/a | —N/a | —N/a | —N/a | —N/a |
| 1994 | 22 | NC | —N/a | —N/a | —N/a | —N/a | —N/a |
| 1995 | 23 | NC | —N/a | —N/a | —N/a | —N/a | —N/a |
| 1996 | 24 | NC | —N/a | —N/a | —N/a | —N/a | —N/a |
| 1997 | 25 | NC | —N/a | NC | —N/a | — | —N/a |
| 1998 | 26 | NC | —N/a | NC | —N/a | — | —N/a |
| 1999 | 27 | 71 | —N/a | 48 | —N/a | — | —N/a |
| 2000 | 28 | 56 | —N/a | 53 | 42 | — | —N/a |
| 2001 | 29 | 77 | —N/a | —N/a | —N/a | — | —N/a |
| 2002 | 30 | 75 | —N/a | —N/a | —N/a | — | —N/a |
| 2003 | 31 | NC | —N/a | —N/a | —N/a | — | —N/a |
| 2004 | 32 | 78 | 63 | —N/a | —N/a | — | —N/a |
| 2005 | 33 | 57 | 40 | —N/a | —N/a | — | —N/a |
| 2006 | 34 | NC | NC | —N/a | —N/a | — | —N/a |
| 2007 | 35 | NC | NC | —N/a | —N/a | — | — |
