= Clare-Louise Brumley =

Australian cross-country skier (born 1977)

Clare-Louise Brumley (born 30 October 1977) is an Australian cross-country skier, who represented Australia at the 2006 Winter Olympics.

She was selected for the pursuit and 30 km freestyle, but could only compete in the former due to her illness. She placed 42nd out of 67 entrants.
