= Sean Donohue =

American director

Sean Donohue is an American horror movie director, actor, and producer.

== Filmography ==
Year	Film	Producer	Director	Actor	Writer	Notes
2010	If I Can't Have You...	No	Yes	Yes	No	As Larry, co-directed with Christopher Leto
2011	Bloody English	Yes	Yes	No	Yes	Short film
2012	The Housewife Slasher	Yes	No	Yes	No	As Mall Cop
2012	Joe Vampire	Yes	Yes	Yes	Yes	As Barback
2012	The Guy Knows Everything	No	No	Yes	No	Short film
2013	Theatre of the Deranged II	Yes	No	No	No	Executive producer - segment "My Aunt is Coming to Town"
2013	Agrizoophobia	Yes	Yes	No	No	Short film
2013	Die Die Delta Pi	Yes	Yes	Yes	Yes	As Hand Double
2013	Rough Cut	Yes	No	Yes	No	As Guy Under Desk
2013	Hi-8 (Horror Independent 8)	No	No	Yes	No	As Radio Voice (segment "A Very Bad Situation")
2014	Naughty, Dirty, Nasty	Yes	No	No	No	
2015	Franklin: A Symphony of Pain	Yes	No	Yes	Yes	As Monkey / Frog-Brother Mike / Baptist Audience Member
2015	NS404: Not Found	No	No	Yes	No	As Rioter 2
2015	Death-Scort Service	Yes	Yes	Yes	Yes	As John#1 / Strip Club Patron#1
2015	Composing a Symphony of Pain: The Making of Franklin	Yes	No	No	No	
