= Ben Sim =

Australian cross-country skier (born 1985)

Ben Sim (born 30 July 1985 in Cooma, New South Wales) is an Australian cross-country skier who competed in the 2010 Winter Olympics in Vancouver, he finished 20th in the team sprint, 45th in the 15 km, and 47th in the 15 km + 15 km double pursuit event.

Sim's best finish at the FIS Nordic World Ski Championships was 14th twice (Team sprint: 2007, 4 x 10 km: 2009).

His best World Cup finish was 16th in the team sprint event at Whistler Olympic Park in January 2009.

In December 2016, Sim was named to Australia's team for the 2017 Asian Winter Games in Sapporo, Japan.
