= Katie Calder =

New Zealand cross-country skier (born 1980)

Personal information
- Full name: Katherine Calder
- Born: 10 September 1989 (age 36) Canberra, Australia
- Height: 163 cm (5 ft 4 in) (2010)

Sport
- Country: New Zealand
- Sport: Skiing

Katherine Calder (born 10 September 1980), also known as Katie, is a cross-country skier from New Zealand who has competed since 1999. At the 2010 Winter Olympics in Vancouver, she finished 47th in the individual sprint event and 63rd in the 10 km events while not starting the 7.5 km + 7.5 km double pursuit events.

Calder's best finish at the FIS Nordic World Ski Championships was 43rd in the 30 km event at Liberec in 2009.

Her best World Cup finish was 43rd in a 10 km event at Canada in 2008.

Calder was born in Canberra, Australia.
