= Belinda Phillips =

Jamaican swimmer (born 1958)

Personal information
- Born: 4 September 1958 (age 67)

Sport
- Sport: Swimming

Belinda Phillips (born 4 September 1958) is a Jamaican former swimmer. She competed in three events at the 1972 Summer Olympics.
