= Aimee Watson =

Australian cross-country skier (born 1987)

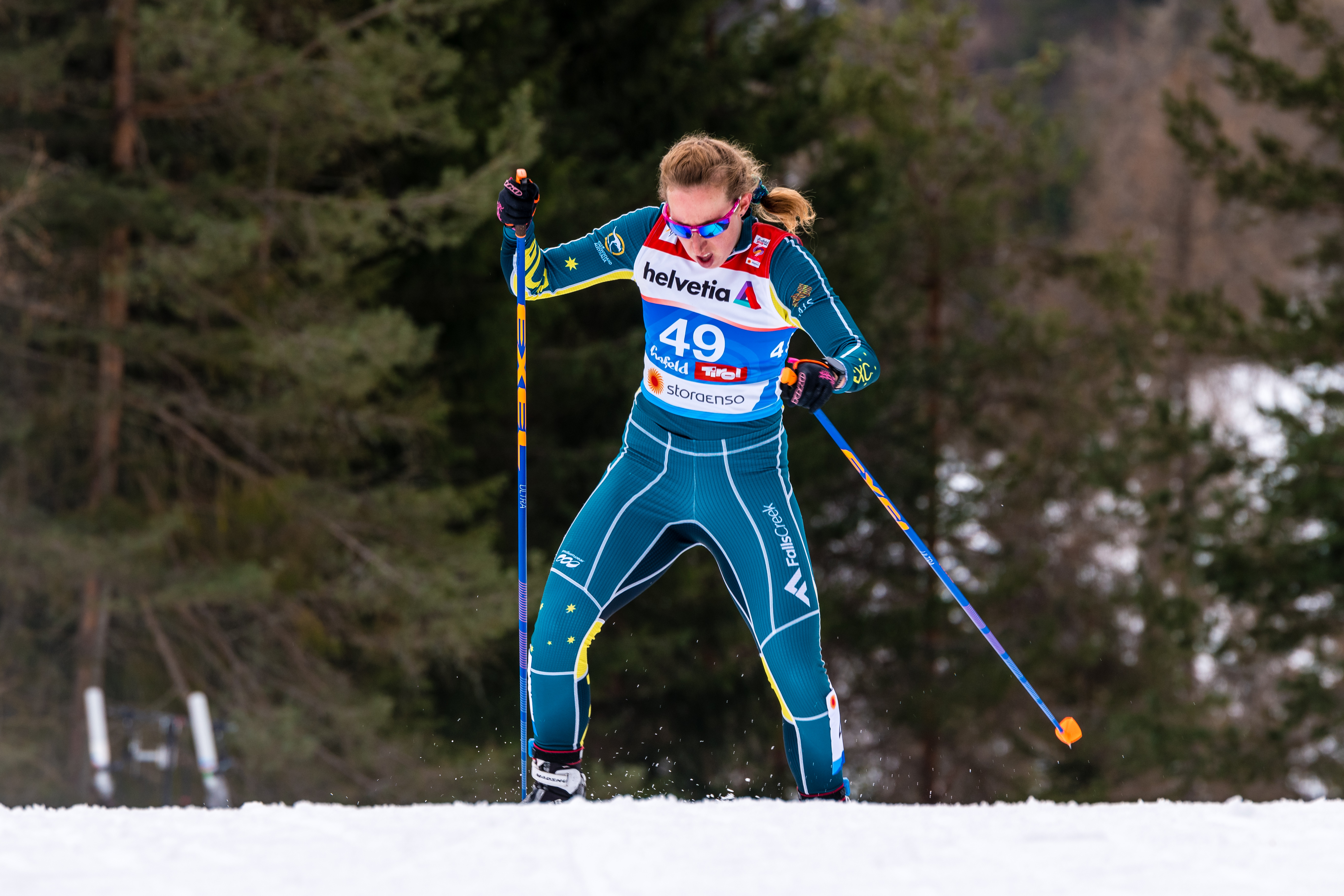
- 2019 FIS NWSC Seefeld Ladies 30km

Personal information
- Born: 28 July 1987 (age 39)

Sport
- Sport: cross-country skiing

Aimee Watson (born 28 July 1987 in Sydney) is an Australian cross-country skier. She competed at the 2014 Winter Olympics in Sochi and 2018 in Pyeong Chang.

Her younger brother Callum Watson also represented Australia in cross-country skiing at the 2014 Winter Olympics.

== Competition record ==
Year	Competition	Venue	Position	Event	Notes
Representing Australia
2014	Olympic Games	Sochi, Russia	63rd	10 kilometre classical	34:56.0
2014	Olympic Games	Sochi, Russia	54th	30 kilometre freestyle	1:34:00.1
