= Snow Farm =

New Zealand cross-country ski area

Coordinates: 44.8775°S 169.091°E

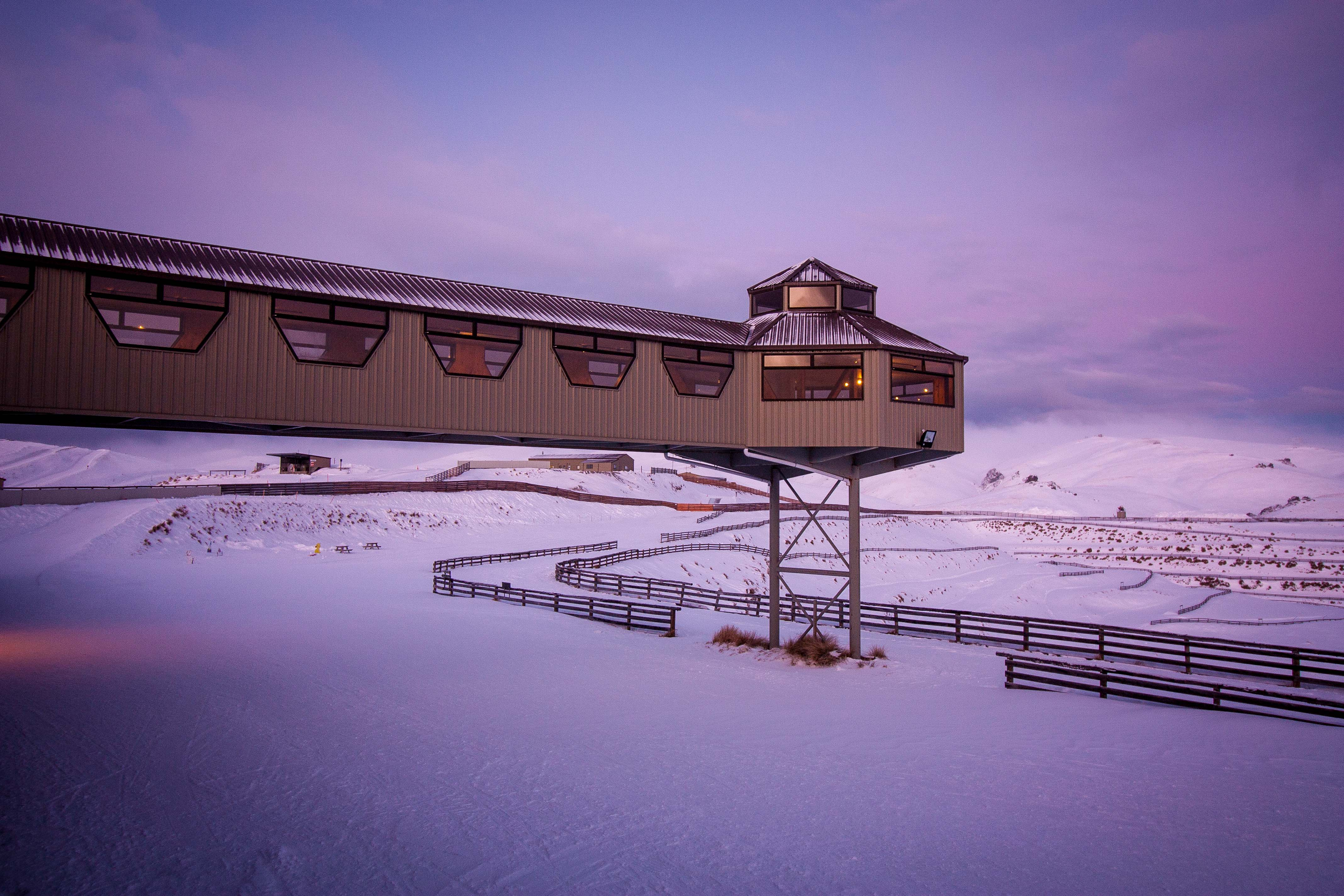
- The main Snow Farm building
- Interactive map of Snow Farm
- Location: South Island, New Zealand
- Nearest city: Wānaka
- Top elevation: 1965 m (Mt Pisa) 1544 m (trail)
- Base elevation: 1520 m
- Snowmaking: No
- Night skiing: No
- Website: https://snowfarm.nz/

Map of Snow Farm

Snow Farm is a ski area near Wānaka, New Zealand, dedicated to cross-country skiing.

== Description ==
The Snow Farm NZ is owned and operated by the Pisa Alpine Charitable Trust (PACT) and is operated on Queenstown Lakes District Council land. The resort is the only non-profit ski area in the Southern Lakes region.

Founded in 1986 by Mary and John Lee on Waiorau Farm, the Snow Farm was the first cross-country ski area in New Zealand. Originally called the Waiorau Nordic Ski Area, Waiorau was the Maori name that Ngai Tahu gave to the area, that translates to ‘the place of over one hundred waters’. The name was later changed to reflect its farming heritage. It features 55 km of trails for beginners and advanced skiers, offering four alpine huts for overnight stay. New base building with Café opened in 2024.

It is located on the Criffel Range close to Cardrona, at an altitude of approx 1,600 m. The area is used for cross country skiing in the winter and during the summer months for altitude training with trails climbing out to 2000m. The proximity of Wānaka (37km) and Queenstown (60km) and the training options around these two towns makes the Snow Farm one of the best locations in the Southern Hemisphere for a live high, train low training regime.

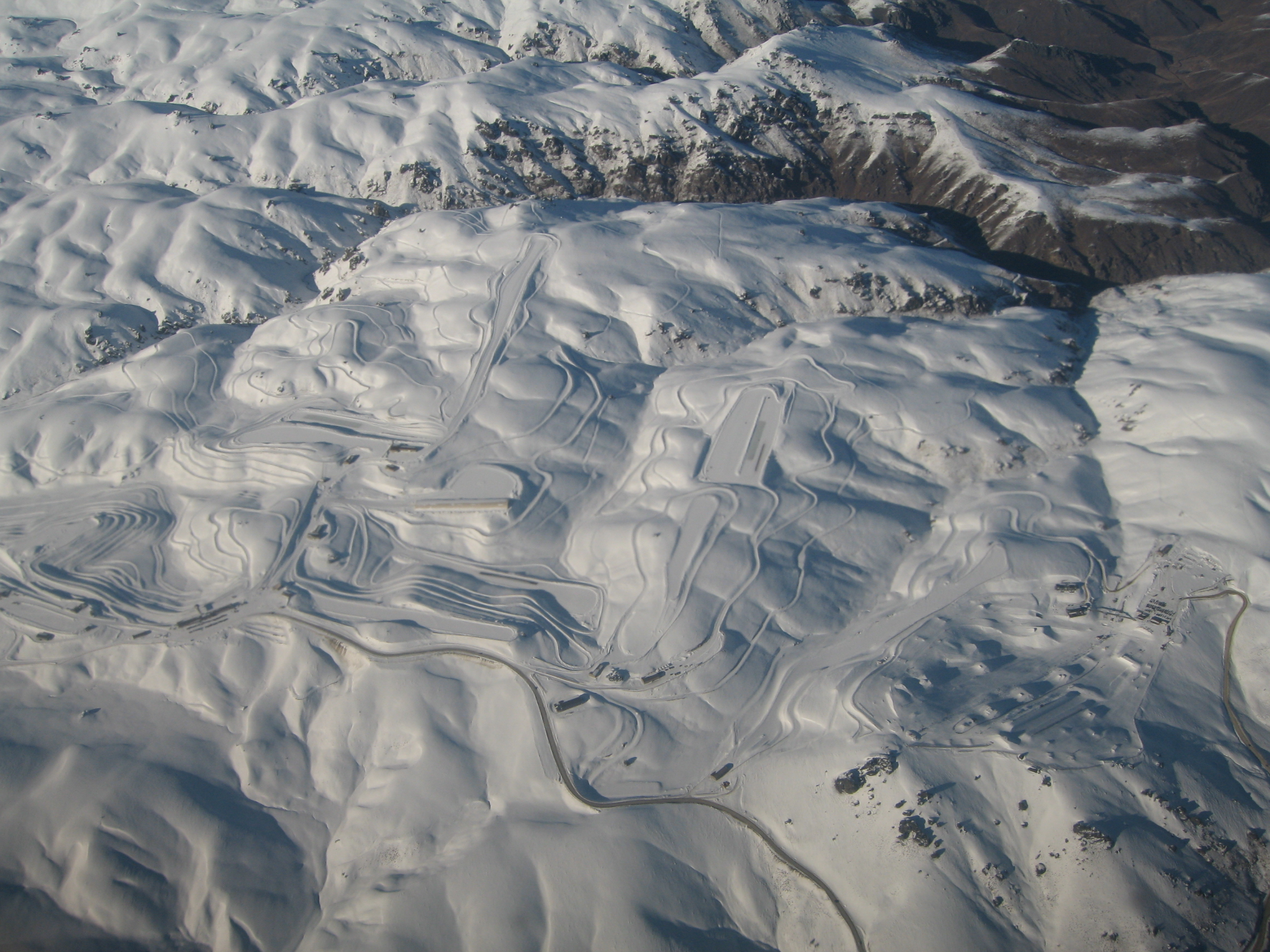
An aerial of Snow Farm on the left and the Southern Proving Grounds on the right

In winter Snow Farm offers tubing hill and snow play area for kids and adults as well as ski and snowshoe rentals. Team of ski instructors is available for ski lessons of all levels. Dogs are welcome too.

During the summer months, mountain biking, hiking, orienteering, rock climbing and adventure racing are available.

It is also the location of the Southern Hemisphere Proving Grounds. The series of twelve vehicle test facilities are used by car manufacturers from around the world for ice and snow testing during the northern-hemisphere summer.

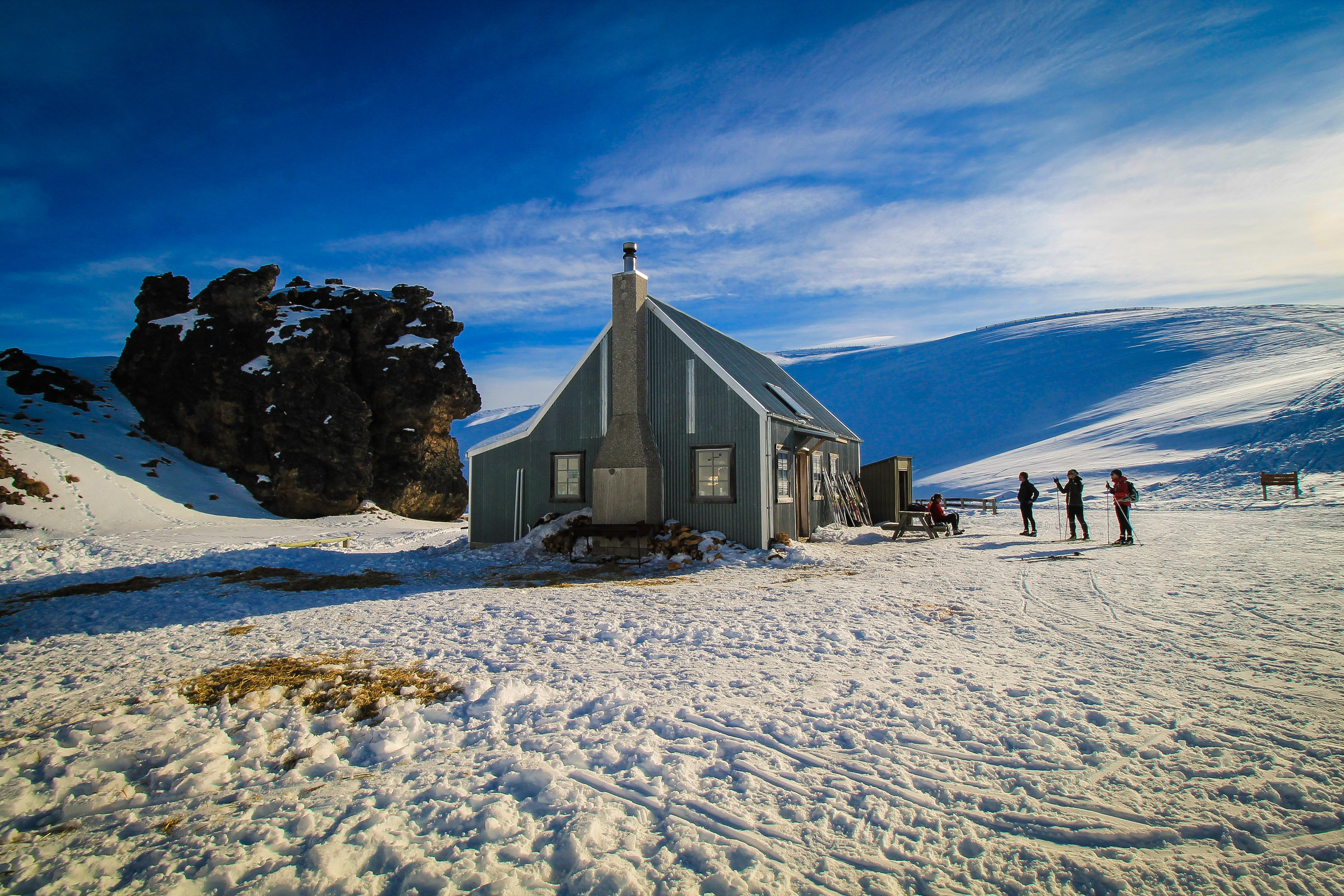
View of Meadow Hut in winter

== Alpine huts ==
Four serviced alpine huts are spread along the trails. Each hut is supplied with solar lights, fireplace, firewood, water, gas, cookers, cooking utensils and mattresses. Bag transfer is also available.

Meadow hut is located 3.5 km from base has open plan bunk room with mezzanine and 20 beds. Is located in the valley by Roaring meg river and surrounded by amazing rock formations.

Musterer's hut is 4.5 km from base. Has 6 bunk rooms with dividing door separating 12 and 24 bunk side. 2 kitchens, 2 fireplaces. Commonly booked for schools and big groups.

Bob Lee hut & Daisy Lee hut are located 6.5 km from the base. Bob sleeps 7 and Daisy 6 people. Dogs are allowed to stay there.

== Access ==
Snow Farm is around 55 km from Queenstown and 35 km from Wānaka. The 13 km gravel access road used to be used for the internationally known Race to the Sky hillclimb.

== Merino Muster ==
An annual cross country skiing event called the Merino Muster is held in late August or start of September and covers distances of 42 km/21 km/7 km and 1 km for children.
