= Lucy Glanville =

Australian biathlete

Personal information
- Born: 16 October 1994 (age 31) Sydney, Australia
- Height: 157 cm (5 ft 2 in)
- Weight: 58 kg (128 lb)

Sport
- Country: Australia
- Sport: Biathlon
- Updated on 11 February 2014

Lucy Glanville (born 16 October 1994) is an Australian biathlete. She has competed at the 2014 Winter Olympics in Sochi.
