= Esther Bottomley =

Australian cross-country skier (born 1983)

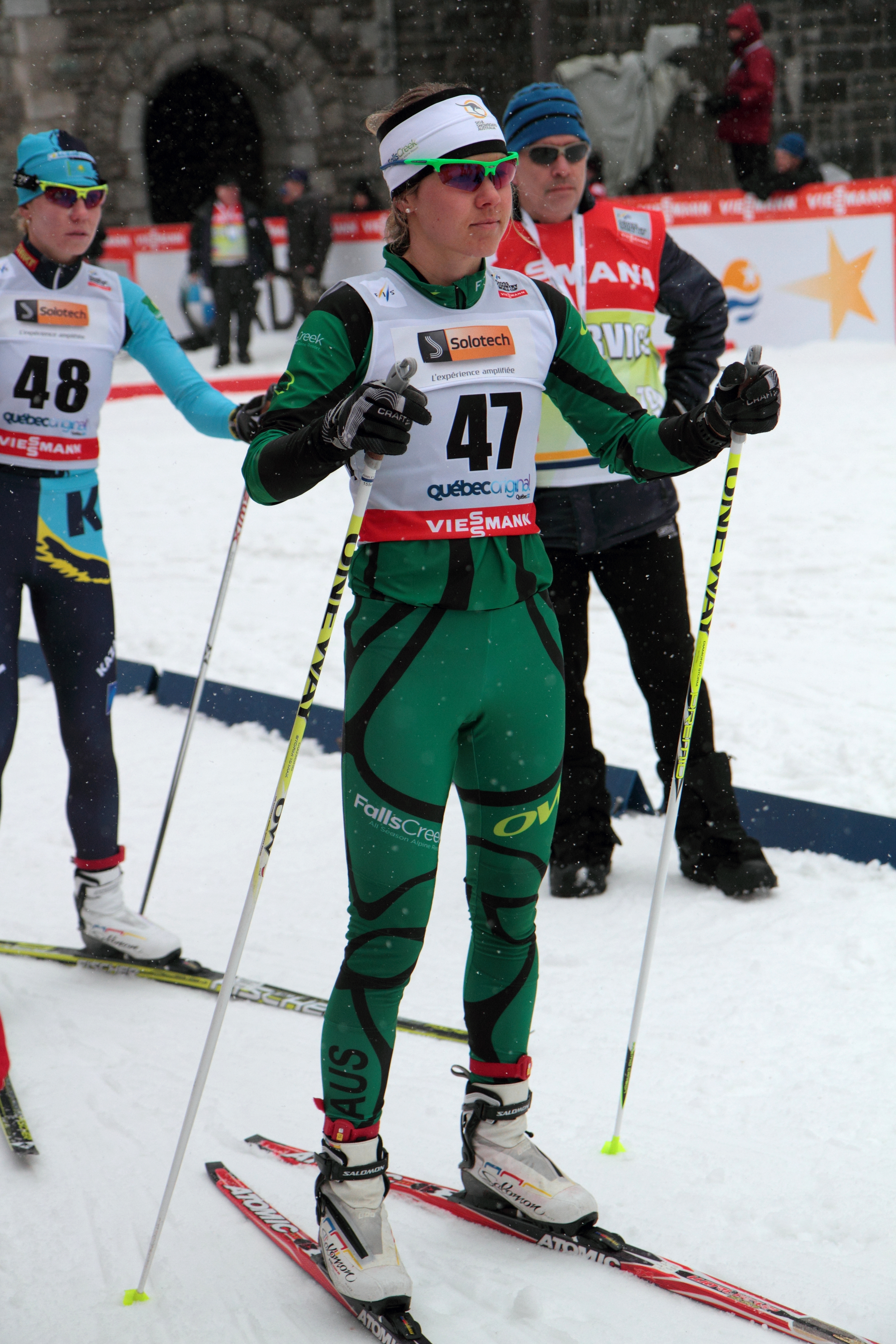
- Bottomley in 2012

Personal information
- Born: 8 February 1983 (age 42) Terang, Victoria, Australia
- Height: 167 cm (5 ft 6 in) (2014)
- Weight: 58 kg (128 lb) (2014)

Sport
- Country: Australia
- Sport: Cross-country skiing
- Updated on 6 February 2014

Esther Bottomley (born 8 February 1983) is an Australian cross-country skier who has competed since 2000. Competing in three Winter Olympics, she earned her best finish of 50th in the individual sprint event at Vancouver in 2010.

Bottomley's best finish at the FIS Nordic World Ski Championships was 50th twice, both in the sprint event (2003. 2005).

Her best World Cup finish was 18th in a team sprint event at Canada in 2009.
