= Barbara Jezeršek =

Slovenian-born Australian cross country skier

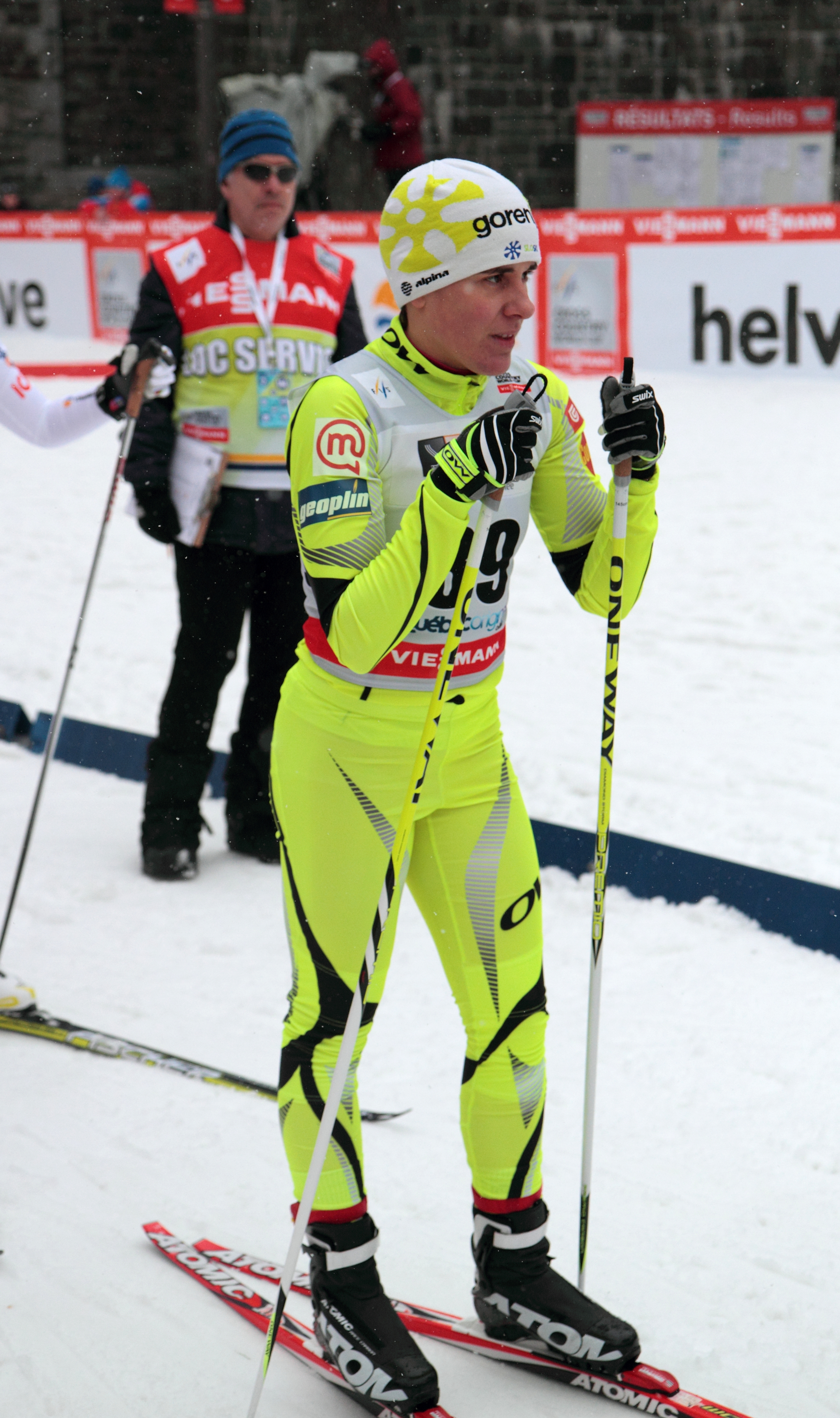
- Barbara Jezeršek in 2012

Personal information
- Nationality: Slovenia (2007–2014); Australia (2016–present)
- Born: 31 October 1986 (age 39) Kranj, Slovenia

Sport
- Sport: Skiing
- Club: NSD Medvode (Slovenia)

World Cup career
- Seasons: 11 – (2007–2014, 2016–2018)
- Indiv. starts: 100
- Indiv. podiums: 0
- Team starts: 12
- Team podiums: 0
- Overall titles: 0 – (68th in 2012)
- Discipline titles: 0
- Updated on 27 May 2019

Barbara Jezeršek (born 31 October 1986) is a Slovenian-born Australian cross country skier, currently representing Australia, who has competed since 2003. At the 2010 Winter Olympics in Vancouver, she finished 14th in the 4 x 5 km relay, 17th in the 7.5 km + 7.5 km double pursuit, and 40th in the 10 km events.

At the 2014 Winter Olympics in Sotchi, she finished 19th in the Skiathlon, 41st in the 10 km Classic, 11th in the 4 × 5 km relay and 31st in the 30 km Mass Start Free

At the FIS Nordic World Ski Championships 2009 in Liberec, Jezeršek finished 44th in the 30 km, 49th in the 7.5 km + 7.5 km double pursuit, and 65th in the individual sprint events. Her best World Cup finish was ninth in a 4 × 5 km relay event in Norway in November 2009, while her best individual finish was 34th at a 10 km event in Canada in February 2010. She is openly lesbian. She received Australian citizenship in 2016.

She is one of the six openly gay athletes who competed at the Sochi 2014 Winter Olympics.

== Cross-country skiing results ==
All results are sourced from the International Ski Federation (FIS).

=== Olympic Games ===
Year	Age	10 km individual	15 km skiathlon	30 km mass start	Sprint	4 × 5 km relay	Team sprint
2010	23	40	17	—	—	14	—
2014	27	39	18	30	—	10	—
2018	31	33	39	—	—	—	12

=== World Championships ===
Year	Age	10 km individual	15 km skiathlon	30 km mass start	Sprint	4 × 5 km relay	Team sprint
2009	22	—	48	43	65	—	—
2011	24	—	20	22	—	7	—
2013	26	44	40	—	—	14	—
2017	30	51	24	35	46	15	—
2019	32	—	—	47	69	—	—

=== World Cup ===
==== Season standings ====
Season	Age	Discipline standings			Ski Tour standings			
Season	Age	Overall	Distance	Sprint	Nordic Opening	Tour de Ski	World Cup Final	Ski Tour Canada
2007	20	NC	NC	NC	—N/a	46	—N/a	—N/a
2008	21	NC	NC	NC	—N/a	42	—	—N/a
2009	22	NC	NC	NC	—N/a	—	—	—N/a
2010	23	NC	NC	NC	—N/a	—	—	—N/a
2011	24	74	53	81	—	DNF	—	—N/a
2012	25	68	48	80	53	35	—	—N/a
2013	26	77	54	NC	32	DNF	—	—N/a
2014	27	75	53	NC	37	29	—	—N/a
2016	29	NC	—	NC	—	—	—N/a	—
2017	30	NC	NC	NC	—	DNF	—	—N/a
2018	31	NC	NC	NC	—	—	—	—N/a
