= Callum Watson (skier) =

Australian cross-country skier (born 1989)

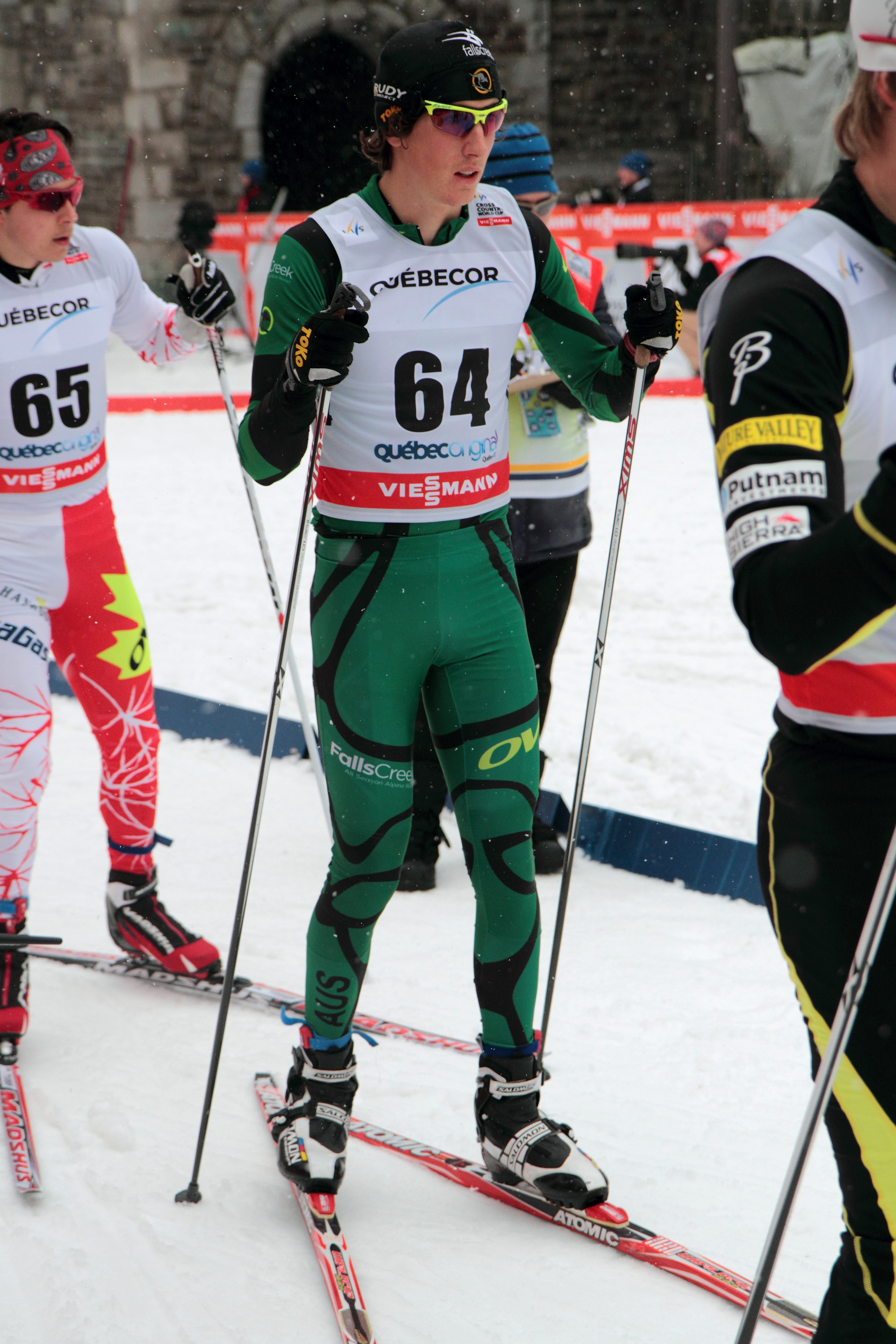
- Watson in 2012

Personal information
- Born: 6 October 1989 (age 36) Sydney, Australia
- Height: 179 cm (5 ft 10 in)
- Weight: 66 kg (146 lb)
- Website: www.callumwxc.com

Sport
- Sport: Cross-country skiing
- Club: Cooma Ski Club
- Updated on 11 February 2014

Callum Watson (born 6 October 1989) is an Australian cross-country skier. He represented Australia at the 2014 Winter Olympics in Sochi, Russia. He also competed in the 2015 world championships in Falun, Sweden.

In 2014, Watson recorded a VO_{2} max of 89.6ml/kg/min at the Australian Institute of Sport (AIS). This broke the record for AIS athletes previously held by Cadel Evans.

His older sister Aimee Watson also represented Australia in cross-country skiing at the 2014 Winter Olympics.

== Competition record ==
Year	Competition	Venue	Position	Event	Notes
Representing Australia
2014	Olympic Games	Sochi, Russia	75th	15 kilometre classical	45:46.5
2014	Olympic Games	Sochi, Russia	60th	30 kilometre skiathlon	1:17:00.4
2014	Olympic Games	Sochi, Russia	85th	Sprint	5:29.62
2014	Olympic Games	Sochi, Russia	12th	Team sprint	25:54.31
2015	World Championships	Falun, Sweden	72nd	15 kilometre freestyle	40:40.3
2015	World Championships	Falun, Sweden	DNF	50 kilometre classical	
