= Valerio Leccardi =

Swiss cross-country skier

Personal information
- Nationality: Switzerland
- Born: 28 May 1984 (age 42) Davos, Switzerland
- Spouse: Esther Bottomley

Sport
- Sport: Skiing
- Club: SC Gardes Frontières

World Cup career
- Seasons: 2007–2015
- Indiv. starts: 40
- Indiv. podiums: 0
- Team starts: 6
- Team podiums: 0
- Overall titles: 0 – (101st in 2010)
- Discipline titles: 0

Valerio Leccardi (born 28 May 1984) is a Swiss cross-country skier who has been competing since 2001. He finished 38th in the individual sprint event at the 2010 Winter Olympics in Vancouver, Canada.

At the FIS Nordic World Ski Championships 2009 in Liberec, Leccardi finished 16th in the team sprint and 31st in the individual sprint events.

His best World Cup finish is 15th in an individual sprint event at Canada in January 2010.

== World Cup results ==
All results are sourced from the International Ski Federation (FIS).

=== World Cup standings ===
Season	Age	Season standings			Ski Tour standings		
Season	Age	Overall	Distance	Sprint	Nordic Opening	Tour de Ski	World Cup Final
2007	23	NC	NC	NC	—N/a	DNP	—N/a
2008	24	130	DNP	90	—N/a	DNP	DNP
2009	25	118	NC	67	—N/a	DNP	DNP
2010	26	101	DNP	48	—N/a	DNP	DNP
2011	27	174	DNP	113	DNP	DNP	DNP
2012	28	NC	NC	NC	DNP	DNP	DNP
2013	29	130	DNP	75	DNP	DNP	DNP
2014	30	NC	DNP	NC	DNP	DNP	DNP
2015	31	NC	NC	NC	DNP	DNP	—N/a
