= Phillip Bellingham =

Australian cross-country skier (born 1991)

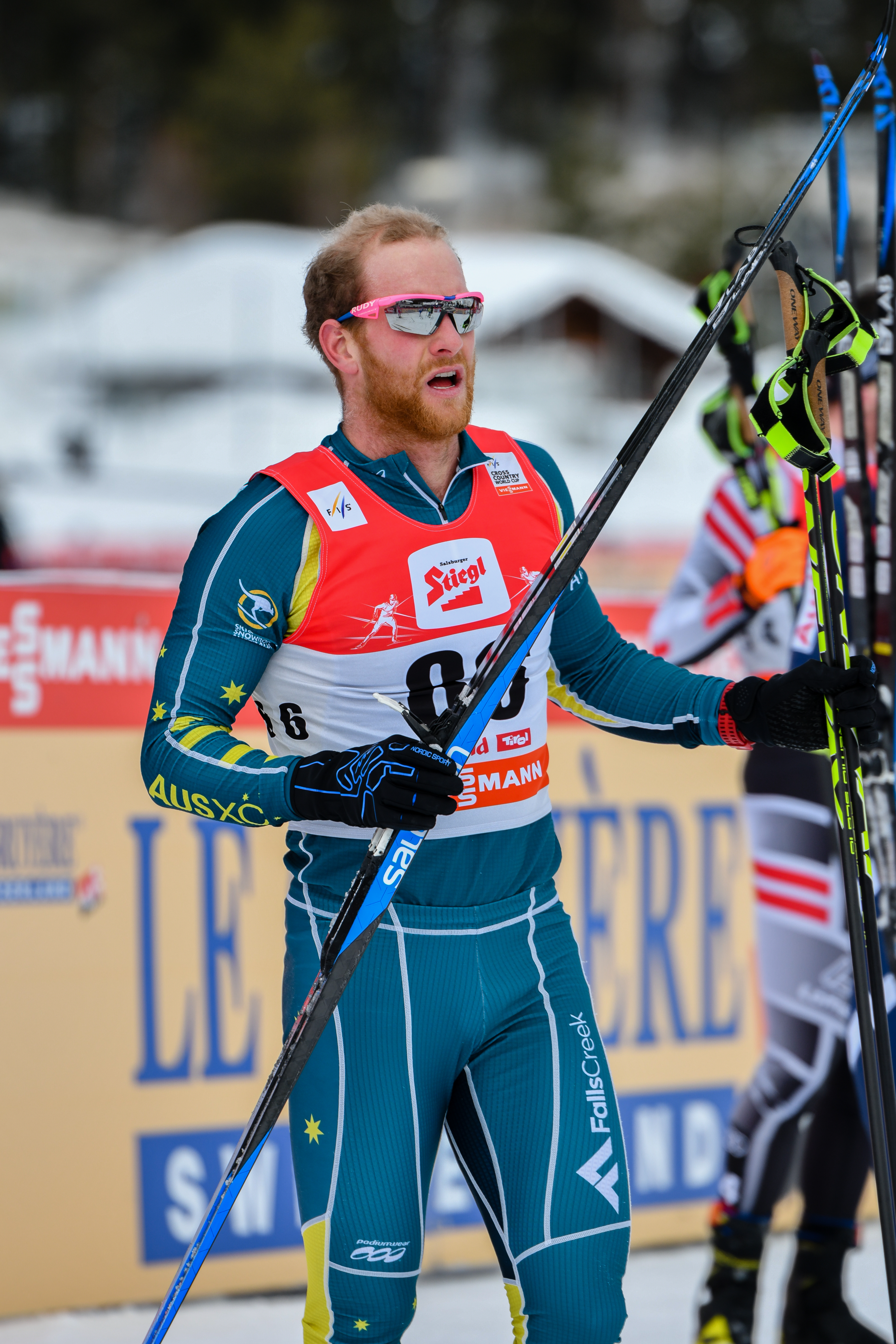
- Bellingham in 2018

Personal information
- Nickname: Philpot
- Nationality: Australian
- Born: 24 February 1991 (age 35) Mount Beauty, Victoria, Australia
- Education: Education (Secondary) Mt Beauty Secondary College - Charles Sturt University, Sports Science - University of Ballarat, Australia
- Occupation: Athlete

Sport
- Sport: Cross-country skiing
- Club: Birkebeiner Nordic Ski Club (Mount Beauty, Victoria, Australia)
- Turned pro: in 2012 FIS Cross-Country World Cup, Milan, Italy
- Coached by: Valerio Leccardi

Phillip Bellingham (born 24 February 1991) is an Australian cross-country skier from Mount Beauty, Victoria. He represented Australia at the 2014 Winter Olympics in Sochi, Russia, and at the 2018 Winter Olympics in PyeongChang, South Korea.

== Competition record ==
Year	Competition	Venue	Position	Event	Notes
Representing Australia
2014	Olympic Games	Sochi, Russia	76th	15 kilometre classical	46:16.4
2014	Olympic Games	Sochi, Russia	55th	Sprint	3:45.65
2014	Olympic Games	Sochi, Russia	12th (Semi-final)	Team sprint	25:54.31
2018	Olympic Games	PyeongChang, South Korea	73rd	15 kilometre freestyle	38:36.2
