= Seve de Campo =

Australian cross-country skier (born 1998)

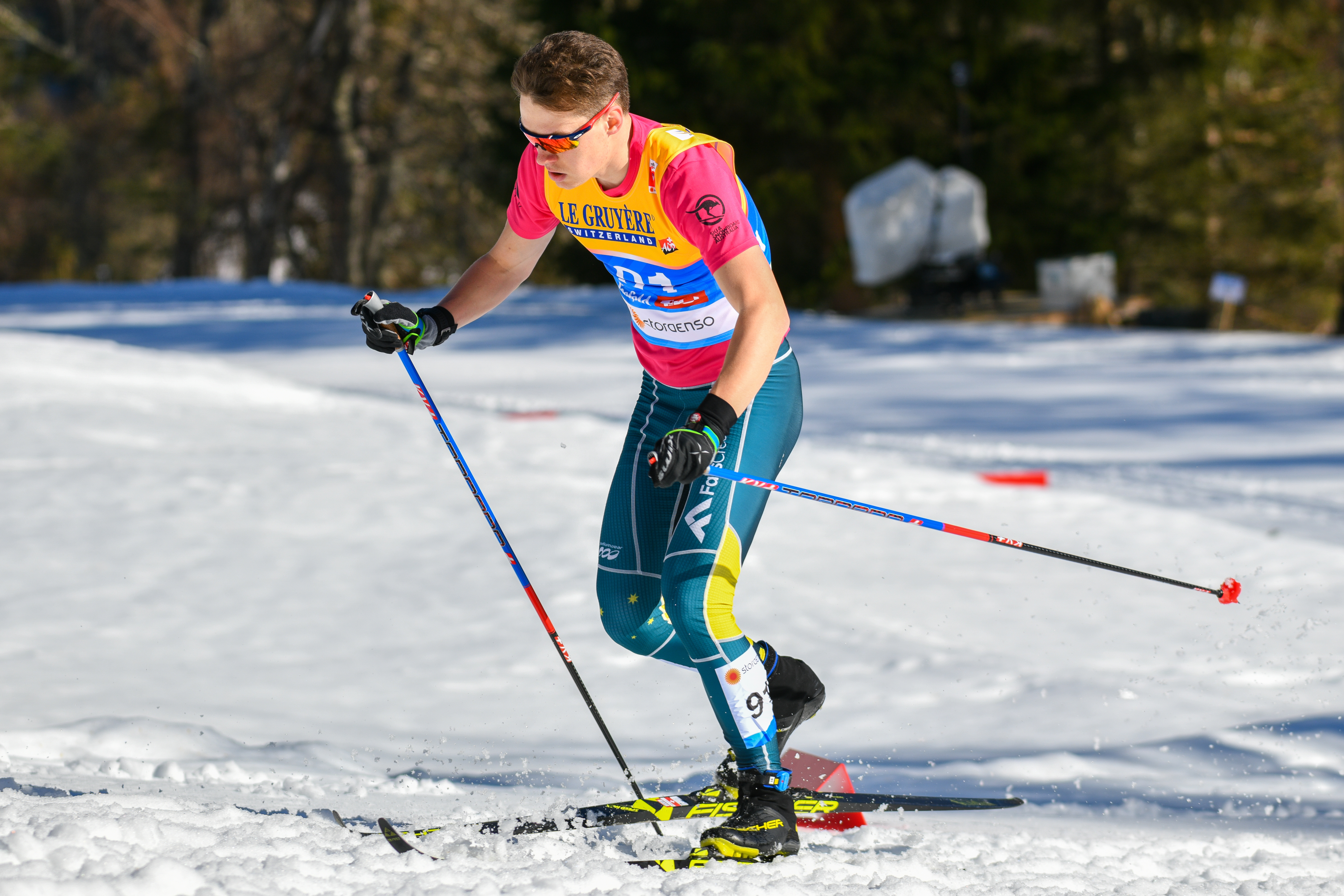

Personal information
- Born: 15 July 1998 (age 28) Melbourne, Victoria, Australia
- Height: 186 cm (6 ft 1 in)
- Weight: 78 kg (172 lb)

Sport
- Country: Australia
- Sport: Cross-country skiing

Seve de Campo (born 15 July 1998) is an Australian cross-country skier who competes internationally in the World Cup circuit.

He represented his country at the 2022 Winter Olympics and 2026 Olympics.

In the 2023/24 season, Seve managed to finish in the top 50 twice, earning his first World Cup points in the process. In the following season, he achieved his best result in Val di Fiemme with a 45th-place finish. Together with Phillip Bellingham, he completed the overall standings of the 2023/24 Tour de Ski in 52nd place. At the 2025 Nordic World Ski Championships in Trondheim, he finished 50th in the 50 km race. At his second Olympic Winter Games in 2026, Seve de Campo was the best Australian, placing 61st in the 10 km freestyle interval start. In the skiathlon, he finished 57th. In the 50km race he made a historic step with place 41.

Privates:

He trains and lives in Lillehammer, Norway. His younger brother Fedele (*2001) is also an Australian cross country skier.
