= Casey Wright (skier) =

Australian cross-country skier (born 1994)

Personal information
- Nationality: Australia
- Born: 19 December 1994 (age 31) Alexandra, Victoria, Australia

Sport
- Sport: Skiing
- Club: Birkebeiner Nordic SC

World Cup career
- Seasons: 2 – (2019–2020, 2022–present)
- Indiv. starts: 12
- Indiv. podiums: 0
- Team starts: 0
- Overall titles: 0
- Discipline titles: 0
- Updated on 17 February 2022

Casey Wright (born 19 December 1994) is an Australian cross-country skier. She competed in the women's sprint at the 2018 Winter Olympics.

== Cross-country skiing results ==
All results are sourced from the International Ski Federation (FIS).

=== Olympic Games ===
Year	Age	10 km individual	15 km skiathlon	30 km mass start	Sprint	4 × 5 km relay	Team sprint
2018	23	81	—	—	—	—	63
2022	27	67	—	56	65	—	16

=== World Championships ===
Year	Age	10 km individual	15 km skiathlon	30 km mass start	Sprint	4 × 5 km relay	Team sprint
2015	20	—	DNS	47	—	14	18

=== World Cup ===
==== Season standings ====
Season	Age	Discipline standings			Ski Tour standings			
Season	Age	Overall	Distance	Sprint	Nordic Opening	Tour de Ski	Ski Tour 2020	World Cup Final
2019	24	NC	NC	NC	—	—	—N/a	70
2020	25	NC	NC	NC	—	—	—	—N/a
