= 2017–18 Tour de Ski =

Cross-country skiing event

Tour de Ski
2017–18 FIS Cross-Country World Cup

Ski tour details
- Venue(s): Lenzerheide, Switzerland; Oberstdorf, Germany; Val di Fiemme, Italy
- Dates: 30 December 2017 – 7 January 2018
- Stages: 7 (6 completed, 1 cancelled)

Results
Men
Jersey awarded to the men's overall winner	Winner	Dario Cologna (SUI)
	Second	Martin Johnsrud Sundby (NOR)
	Third	Alex Harvey (CAN)
Jersey awarded to the men's sprint classification winner	Sprint	Dario Cologna (SUI)
Women
Jersey awarded to the women's overall winner	Winner	Heidi Weng (NOR)
	Second	Ingvild Flugstad Østberg (NOR)
	Third	Jessie Diggins (USA)
Jersey awarded to the women's sprint classification winner	Sprint	Ingvild Flugstad Østberg (NOR)

The 2017–18 Tour de Ski was the 12th edition of the Tour de Ski, part of the 2017–18 FIS Cross-Country World Cup. The World Cup stage event began in Lenzerheide, Switzerland, on December 30, 2017, and ended in Val di Fiemme, Italy, on January 7, 2018. The cups were defended by Heidi Weng (Norway) and Sergey Ustiugov (Russia).

== Schedule ==
Stage	Venue	Date	Event	Technique	Distance		Start time (CET)	
Stage	Venue	Date	Event	Technique	Women	Men	Women	Men
1	Lenzerheide (SUI)	30 December 2017	Sprint	Freestyle	1.5 km	1.5 km	13:00	13:27
2	Lenzerheide (SUI)	31 December 2017	Distance, individual start	Classic	10 km	15 km	15:00	10:30
3	Lenzerheide (SUI)	1 January 2018	Distance, pursuit	Freestyle	10 km	15 km	11:00	13:00
4^{[a]}	Oberstdorf (GER)	3 January 2018	~~Sprint~~	~~Classic~~	1.2 km	1.5 km	14:50	14:50
5^{[b]}	Oberstdorf (GER)	4 January 2018	Distance, mass start	Freestyle	10 km	15 km	10:15	11:15
6	Val di Fiemme (ITA)	6 January 2018	Distance, mass start	Classic	10 km	15 km	14:15	15:45
7	Val di Fiemme (ITA)	7 January 2018	Final climb, pursuit	Freestyle	9 km	9 km	11:30	14:30

a. ^{1} Stage 4 was cancelled due to the bad weather.
b. ^{1} Stage 5 men's distance was shortened due to previous day's storm damage.

== Overall leadership ==
Overall leadership by stage
Stage	Men			Women		
Stage	Winner	Overall standings	Sprint standings	Winner	Overall standings	Sprint standings
1	Sergey Ustiugov	Sergey Ustiugov	Sergey Ustiugov	Laurien van der Graaff	Laurien van der Graaff	Laurien van der Graaff
2	Dario Cologna	Sergey Ustiugov	Sergey Ustiugov	Ingvild Flugstad Østberg	Ingvild Flugstad Østberg	Laurien van der Graaff
3	Dario Cologna	Dario Cologna	Sergey Ustiugov	Ingvild Flugstad Østberg	Ingvild Flugstad Østberg	Laurien van der Graaff
4	Cancelled	Dario Cologna	Sergey Ustiugov	Cancelled	Ingvild Flugstad Østberg	Laurien van der Graaff
5	Emil Iversen	Dario Cologna	Sergey Ustiugov	Ingvild Flugstad Østberg	Ingvild Flugstad Østberg	Ingvild Flugstad Østberg
6	Alexey Poltoranin	Dario Cologna	Sergey Ustiugov	Heidi Weng	Ingvild Flugstad Østberg	Ingvild Flugstad Østberg
7	Martin Johnsrud Sundby	Dario Cologna	Dario Cologna	Heidi Weng	Heidi Weng	Ingvild Flugstad Østberg
Final		Dario Cologna	Dario Cologna	Final	Heidi Weng	Ingvild Flugstad Østberg

== Final standings ==
Legend
Denotes the winner of the Overall standings	Denotes the winner of the Sprint standings

=== Overall standings ===
==== Men ====
Final overall standings (1–10)
Rank	Name	Time
1	Dario Cologna (SUI)	2:49:29.8
2	Martin Johnsrud Sundby (NOR)	+1:26.5
3	Alex Harvey (CAN)	+1:30.6
4	Alexey Poltoranin (KAZ)	+1:41.7
5	Hans Christer Holund (NOR)	+2:17.8
6	Alexander Bolshunov (RUS)	+3:09.7
7	Jean-Marc Gaillard (FRA)	+3:16.7
8	Daniel Rickardsson (SWE)	+3:20.8
9	Aleksey Chervotkin (RUS)	+3:33.5
10	Andrey Larkov (RUS)	+3:37.8

Final overall standings (11–43)
Rank	Name	Time
11	Maurice Manificat (FRA)	+3:45.7
12	Niklas Dyrhaug (NOR)	+4:46.3
13	Denis Spitsov (RUS)	+5:13.1
14	Emil Iversen (NOR)	+5:15.7
15	Andrew Musgrave (GBR)	+5:18.1
16	Martin Jakš (CZE)	+5:26.3
17	Didrik Tønseth (NOR)	+5:35.0
18	Alexey Vitsenko (RUS)	+5:51.2
19	Andrey Melnichenko (RUS)	+5:58.3
20	Thomas Bing (GER)	+6:27.3
21	Ivan Yakimushkin (RUS)	+7:01.0
22	Toni Livers (SUI)	+7:32.5
23	Jonas Dobler (GER)	+7:46.7
24	Karel Tammjärv (EST)	+7:55.7
25	Lucas Bögl (GER)	+7:59.5
26	Stanislav Volzhentsev (RUS)	+8:10.8
27	Andreas Katz (GER)	+8:22.6
28	Oskar Svensson (SWE)	+8:27.9
29	Jonas Baumann (SUI)	+9:01.6
30	Florian Notz (GER)	+9:42.9
31	Petr Knop (CZE)	+9:49.0
32	Candide Pralong (SUI)	+10:23.5
33	Mirco Bertolina (ITA)	+10:41.8
34	Damien Tarantola (FRA)	+11:16.1
35	Antti Ojansivu (FIN)	+11:29.3
36	Aleš Razým (CZE)	+11:32.7
37	Kusti Kittilä (FIN)	+11:51.1
38	Patrick Caldwell (USA)	+11:54.8
39	Michal Novák (CZE)	+12:32.1
40	Ari Luusua (FIN)	+12:34.7
41	Gleb Retivykh (RUS)	+12:50.1
42	Andy Kühne (GER)	+12:52.1
43	Valentin Mättig (GER)	+13:00.0

==== Women ====
Final overall standings (1–10)
Rank	Name	Time
1	Heidi Weng (NOR)	2:20:56.5
2	Ingvild Flugstad Østberg (NOR)	+48.5
3	Jessie Diggins (USA)	+2:23.2
4	Krista Pärmäkoski (FIN)	+2:57.7
5	Teresa Stadlober (AUT)	+3:09.4
6	Kerttu Niskanen (FIN)	+4:17.0
7	Anastasia Sedova (RUS)	+4:49.6
8	Nathalie von Siebenthal (SUI)	+4:56.1
9	Sadie Bjornsen (USA)	+6:15.0
10	Stefanie Böhler (GER)	+6:41.1

Final overall standings (11–32)
Rank	Name	Time
11	Natalya Nepryayeva (RUS)	+7:13.5
12	Anna Haag (SWE)	+7:14.5
13	Petra Nováková (CZE)	+7:44.2
14	Emma Wikén (SWE)	+8:03.1
15	Aino-Kaisa Saarinen (FIN)	+8:08.2
16	Elizabeth Stephen (USA)	+8:25.8
17	Elisa Brocard (ITA)	+8:38.9
18	Anna Nechaevskaya (RUS)	+8:44.5
19	Nadine Fähndrich (SUI)	+9:41.1
20	Alisa Zhambalova (RUS)	+9:53.1
21	Katharina Hennig (GER)	+10:06.4
22	Anne Kjersti Kalvå (NOR)	+10:32.4
23	Maria Nordström (SWE)	+10:42.4
24	Rosie Brennan (USA)	+10:59.6
25	Jennie Öberg (SWE)	+11:30.2
26	Pia Fink (GER)	+11:59.5
27	Anna Shevchenko (KAZ)	+12:28.1
28	Evelina Settlin (SWE)	+12:31.7
29	Linn Sömskar (SWE)	+12:50.6
30	Yana Kirpichenko (RUS)	+12:57.0
31	Mariya Guschina (RUS)	+13:16.4
32	Kateřina Beroušková (CZE)	+14:22.5

=== Sprint standings ===
==== Men ====
Final sprint standings (1–10)
Rank	Name	Bonus
1	Dario Cologna (SUI)	1:25
2	Alexander Bolshunov (RUS)	0:59
3	Alex Harvey (CAN)	0:55
4	Alexey Poltoranin (KAZ)	0:47
5	Martin Johnsrud Sundby (NOR)	0:38
6	Emil Iversen (NOR)	0:37
7	Andrew Musgrave (GBR)	0:28
8	Andrey Larkov (RUS)	0:24
9	Didrik Tønseth (NOR)	0:10
10	Maurice Manificat (FRA)	0:09

==== Women ====
Final sprint standings (1–10)
Rank	Name	Bonus
1	Ingvild Flugstad Østberg (NOR)	1:33
2	Heidi Weng (NOR)	1:30
3	Jessie Diggins (USA)	1:13
4	Krista Pärmäkoski (FIN)	1:08
5	Natalya Nepryayeva (RUS)	0:47
6	Sadie Bjornsen (USA)	0:15
7	Kerttu Niskanen (FIN)	0:12
8	Teresa Stadlober (AUT)	0:11
9	Aino-Kaisa Saarinen (FIN)	0:10
10	Nadine Fähndrich (SUI)	0:10

=== Team standings ===
Final team standings (1–7)
Rank	Nation	Time
1	Norway	10:23:09.5
2	Russia	+9:29.4
3	Switzerland	+16:33.9
4	Finland	+18:01.5
5	Sweden	+19:59.5
6	Germany	+20:19.1
7	Czech Republic	+34:30.8

== Stages ==
=== Stage 1 ===
30 December 2017, Lenzerheide, Switzerland

- Bonus seconds to the 30 skiers that qualifies for the quarter-finals, distributed as following:
  - Final: 60–54–48–46–44–42
  - Semi-final: 32–30–28–26–24–22
  - Quarter-final: 10–10–10–8–8–8–8–8–6–6–6–6–6–4–4–4–4–4

Men – 1.5 km Sprint Freestyle
Rank	Name	Time	BS
1	Sergey Ustiugov (RUS)	2:57.28	60
2	Federico Pellegrino (ITA)	+1.00	54
3	Lucas Chanavat (FRA)	+2.76	48
4	Ristomatti Hakola (FIN)	+5.91	46
5	Finn Hågen Krogh (NOR)	+14.39	44
6	Richard Jouve (FRA)	+21.01	42

Women – 1.5 km Sprint Freestyle
Rank	Name	Time	BS
1	Laurien van der Graaff (SUI)	3:25.80	60
2	Sophie Caldwell (USA)	+1.42	54
3	Maiken Caspersen Falla (NOR)	+1.86	48
4	Natalya Nepryayeva (RUS)	+3.17	46
5	Jessie Diggins (USA)	+4.33	44
6	Sandra Ringwald (GER)	+31.68	42

=== Stage 2 ===
31 December 2017, Lenzerheide, Switzerland

- Bonus seconds in finish: 15–10–5 to the 3 fastest skiers.

Men – 15 km Classic (individual)
Rank	Name	Time	BS
1	Dario Cologna (SUI)	35:29.5	15
2	Alexey Poltoranin (KAZ)	+0.6	10
3	Martin Johnsrud Sundby (NOR)	+13.1	5
4	Alexander Bolshunov (RUS)	+14.0	
5	Aleksey Chervotkin (RUS)	+16.2	
6	Hans Christer Holund (NOR)	+21.2	
7	Iivo Niskanen (FIN)	+22.9	
8	Francesco De Fabiani (ITA)	+27.2	
9	Didrik Tønseth (NOR)	+32.0	
10	Sergey Ustiugov (RUS)	+37.1	

Women – 10 km Classic (individual)
Rank	Name	Time	BS
1	Ingvild Flugstad Østberg (NOR)	26:59.4	15
2	Heidi Weng (NOR)	+25.7	10
3	Sadie Bjornsen (USA)	+42.2	5
4	Kerttu Niskanen (FIN)	+48.9	
5	Anna Haag (SWE)	+52.6	
6	Nicole Fessel (GER)	+58.2	
7	Jessie Diggins (USA)	+1:04.4	
8	Nathalie von Siebenthal (SUI)	+1:08.3	
9	Stefanie Böhler (GER)	+1:08.8	
10	Anamarija Lampič (SLO)	+1:10.9	

=== Stage 3 ===
1 January 2018, Lenzerheide, Switzerland

- Bonus seconds in finish: 15–10–5 to the 3 first skiers crossing the finish line.

Men – 15 km Freestyle (pursuit)
Rank	Name	Time	BS
1	Dario Cologna (SUI)	34:56.6	15
2	Sergey Ustiugov (RUS)	+17.6	10
3	Alexander Bolshunov (RUS)	+45.5	5
4	Alex Harvey (CAN)	+46.8	
5	Alexey Poltoranin (KAZ)	+47.1	
6	Martin Johnsrud Sundby (NOR)	+48.1	
7	Hans Christer Holund (NOR)	+48.2	
8	Aleksey Chervotkin (RUS)	+49.9	
9	Iivo Niskanen (FIN)	+51.5	
10	Marcus Hellner (SWE)	+1:21.7	

Women – 10 km Freestyle (pursuit)
Rank	Name	Time	BS
1	Ingvild Flugstad Østberg (NOR)	26:48.1	15
2	Heidi Weng (NOR)	+27.8	10
3	Jessie Diggins (USA)	+1:16.9	5
4	Krista Pärmäkoski (FIN)	+1:45.9	
5	Sadie Bjornsen (USA)	+1:46.2	
6	Kerttu Niskanen (FIN)	+1:46.6	
7	Astrid Uhrenholdt Jacobsen (NOR)	+1:59.9	
8	Nicole Fessel (GER)	+2:00.3	
9	Petra Nováková (CZE)	+2:01.0	
10	Sandra Ringwald (GER)	+2:11.3	

=== Stage 4 ===
3 January 2018, Oberstdorf, Germany

- Stage was cancelled due to the bad weather.

=== Stage 5 ===
4 January 2018, Oberstdorf, Germany

Men – 15 km Freestyle (mass start)
Rank	Name	Time	BS
1	Emil Iversen (NOR)	29:49.8	15
2	Sindre Bjørnestad Skar (NOR)	+0.4	10
3	Francesco De Fabiani (ITA)	+0.9	5
4	Dario Cologna (SUI)	+3.7	27
5	Alex Harvey (CAN)	+4.0	6
6	Andrew Musgrave (GBR)	+4.0	22
7	Finn Hågen Krogh (NOR)	+4.0	
8	Martin Johnsrud Sundby (NOR)	+4.2	23
9	Thomas Bing (GER)	+4.9	6
10	Maurice Manificat (FRA)	+5.2	7

Women – 10 km Freestyle (mass start)
Rank	Name	Time	BS
1	Ingvild Flugstad Østberg (NOR)	23:16.5	25
2	Maiken Caspersen Falla (NOR)	+1.9	10
3	Krista Pärmäkoski (FIN)	+3.2	20
4	Nathalie von Siebenthal (SUI)	+4.1	
5	Maria Nordström (SWE)	+4.4	3
6	Nicole Fessel (GER)	+5.5	6
7	Teresa Stadlober (AUT)	+5.8	
8	Anne Kjersti Kalvå (NOR)	+6.5	4
9	Anastasia Sedova (RUS)	+6.7	
10	Emma Wikén (SWE)	+7.1	

==== Stage 5 bonus seconds ====
- Men: 2 intermediate sprints, bonus seconds to the 10 first skiers (15–12–10–8–6–5–4–3–2–1) past the intermediate points.
- Women: 1 intermediate sprint, bonus seconds to the 10 first skiers (15–12–10–8–6–5–4–3–2–1) past the intermediate point.
- Bonus seconds in finish: 15–10–5 to the 3 first skiers crossing the finish line.

Bonus seconds (Stage 5 – Men)
Name	Point 1	Point 2	Finish	Total
Dario Cologna (SUI)	12	15	–	27
Martin Johnsrud Sundby (NOR)	15	8	–	23
Andrew Musgrave (GBR)	10	12	–	22
Emil Iversen (NOR)	–	–	15	15
Sindre Bjørnestad Skar (NOR)	–	–	10	10
Didrik Tønseth (NOR)	–	10	–	10
Calle Halfvarsson (SWE)	8	–	–	8
Alexander Bolshunov (RUS)	3	5	–	8
Maurice Manificat (FRA)	5	2	–	7
Alex Harvey (CAN)	6	–	–	6
Thomas Bing (GER)	–	6	–	6
Francesco De Fabiani (ITA)	–	–	5	5
Sergey Ustiugov (RUS)	4	–	–	4
Marcus Hellner (SWE)	–	4	–	4
Andrey Larkov (RUS)	–	3	–	3
Adrien Backscheider (FRA)	2	–	–	2
Alexey Chervotkin (RUS)	1	–	–	1
Dominik Baldauf (AUT)	–	1	–	1

Bonus seconds (Stage 5 – Women)
Name	Point 1	Finish	Total
Ingvild Flugstad Østberg (NOR)	10	15	25
Krista Pärmäkoski (FIN)	15	5	20
Jessie Diggins (USA)	12	–	12
Maiken Caspersen Falla (NOR)	–	10	10
Heidi Weng (NOR)	8	–	8
Nicole Fessel (GER)	6	–	6
Anna Haag (SWE)	5	–	5
Anne Kjersti Kalvå (NOR)	4	–	4
Maria Nordström (SWE)	3	–	3
Tiril Udnes Weng (NOR)	2	–	2
Kerttu Niskanen (FIN)	1	–	1

=== Stage 6 ===
6 January 2018, Val di Fiemme, Italy

Men – 15 km Classic (mass start)
Rank	Name	Time	BS
1	Alexey Poltoranin (KAZ)	38:40.3	37
2	Andrey Larkov (RUS)	+0.4	13
3	Alex Harvey (CAN)	+0.9	17
4	Dario Cologna (SUI)	+2.3	18
5	Alexander Bolshunov (RUS)	+15.0	18
6	Daniel Rickardsson (SWE)	+20.2	6
7	Francesco De Fabiani (ITA)	+23.1	1
8	Hans Christer Holund (NOR)	+26.4	7
9	Didrik Tønseth (NOR)	+27.0	
10	Niklas Dyrhaug (NOR)	+28.6	

Women – 10 km Classic (mass start)
Rank	Name	Time	BS
1	Heidi Weng (NOR)	29:07.9	30
2	Krista Pärmäkoski (FIN)	+7.6	18
3	Teresa Stadlober (AUT)	+8.6	11
4	Jessie Diggins (USA)	+23.6	12
5	Ingvild Flugstad Østberg (NOR)	+35.2	10
6	Kerttu Niskanen (FIN)	+45.4	5
7	Anastasia Sedova (RUS)	+46.1	4
8	Natalya Nepryayeva (RUS)	+59.9	1
9	Nathalie von Siebenthal (SUI)	+1:01.0	3
10	Sadie Bjornsen (USA)	+1:11.3	

==== Stage 6 bonus seconds ====
- Men: 2 intermediate sprints, bonus seconds to the 10 first skiers (15–12–10–8–6–5–4–3–2–1) past the intermediate points.
- Women: 1 intermediate sprint, bonus seconds to the 10 first skiers (15–12–10–8–6–5–4–3–2–1) past the intermediate point.
- Bonus seconds in finish: 15–10–5 to the 3 first skiers crossing the finish line.

Bonus seconds (Stage 6 – Men)
Name	Point 1	Point 2	Finish	Total
Alexey Poltoranin (KAZ)	10	12	15	37
Sergey Ustiugov (RUS)	15	15	–	30
Dario Cologna (SUI)	8	10	–	18
Alexander Bolshunov (RUS)	12	6	–	18
Alex Harvey (CAN)	4	8	5	17
Andrey Larkov (RUS)	–	3	10	13
Martin Johnsrud Sundby (NOR)	6	4	–	10
Hans Christer Holund (NOR)	5	2	–	7
Daniel Rickardsson (SWE)	1	5	–	6
Marcus Hellner (SWE)	3	–	–	3
Maurice Manificat (FRA)	2	–	–	2
Francesco De Fabiani (ITA)	–	1	–	1

Bonus seconds (Stage 6 – Women)
Name	Point 1	Finish	Total
Heidi Weng (NOR)	15	15	30
Krista Pärmäkoski (FIN)	8	10	18
Jessie Diggins (USA)	12	–	12
Teresa Stadlober (AUT)	6	5	11
Ingvild Flugstad Østberg (NOR)	10	–	10
Kerttu Niskanen (FIN)	5	–	5
Anastasia Sedova (RUS)	4	–	4
Nathalie von Siebenthal (SUI)	3	–	3
Aino-Kaisa Saarinen (FIN)	2	–	2
Natalya Nepryayeva (RUS)	1	–	1

=== Stage 7 ===
7 January 2018, Val di Fiemme, Italy

The race for "Fastest of the Day" counts for 2017–18 FIS Cross-Country World Cup points. No bonus seconds were awarded on this stage.

Men – 9 km Final Climb Freestyle (pursuit)
Rank	Name	Time
1	Martin Johnsrud Sundby (NOR)	28:36.4
2	Maurice Manificat (FRA)	+12.8
3	Denis Spitsov (RUS)	+14.3
4	Dario Cologna (SUI)	+15.7
5	Hans Christer Holund (NOR)	+20.6
6	Alex Harvey (CAN)	+23.6
7	Didrik Tønseth (NOR)	+26.9
8	Jean-Marc Gaillard (FRA)	+35.4
9	Lucas Bögl (GER)	+43.8
10	Alexey Vitsenko (RUS)	+44.5

Women – 9 km Final Climb Freestyle (pursuit)
Rank	Name	Time
1	Heidi Weng (NOR)	32:11.5
2	Teresa Stadlober (AUT)	+41.3
3	Jessie Diggins (USA)	+41.9
4	Ingvild Flugstad Østberg (NOR)	+49.3
5	Elizabeth Stephen (USA)	+1:22.6
6	Nathalie von Siebenthal (SUI)	+1:23.5
7	Krista Pärmäkoski (FIN)	+1:26.0
8	Kerttu Niskanen (FIN)	+1:29.6
9	Stefanie Böhler (GER)	+1:34.5
10	Anastasia Sedova (RUS)	+1:36.3
