= 2017–18 FIS Cross-Country World Cup Finals =

International skiing competition

2017–18 FIS Cross-Country World Cup

Ski tour details
- Venue(s): Falun, Sweden
- Dates: 16–18 March
- Stages: 3: Sprint F 10/15 km C Mass start 10/15 km F Pursuit

Results
Men
	Winner	Alexander Bolshunov (RUS)
	Second	Alex Harvey (CAN)
	Third	Dario Cologna (SUI)
Women
	Winner	Marit Bjørgen (NOR)
	Second	Jessie Diggins (USA)
	Third	Sadie Bjornsen (USA)

The 2017–18 FIS Cross-Country World Cup Finals were the 10th edition of the FIS Cross-Country World Cup Finals, an annual cross-country skiing mini-tour event. The three-day event was held in Falun, Sweden. It began on 16 March 2018 and concluded on 18 March 2018. It was the final competition round of the 2017–18 FIS Cross-Country World Cup.

Johannes Høsflot Klæbo of Norway and Hanna Falk of Sweden won the first stage of the mini-tour; a sprint freestyle. Alexander Bolshunov of Russia and Marit Bjørgen of Norway won the two last stages; a mass start classic and a pursuit freestyle. Bolshunov and Bjørgen won the overall standings by defending their leading positions on the third stage.

== Overall leadership ==
The results in the overall standings were calculated by adding each rider's finishing times on each stage. On the sprint stage, the winners were awarded 30 bonus seconds. On the second stage, the three fastest skiers in finish were awarded 15, 10 and 5 bonus seconds, and the ten first skiers to pass the intermediate sprint points were also awarded bonus seconds. No bonus seconds were awarded on the third stage. The skier with the lowest cumulative time was the overall winner of the Cross-Country World Cup Finals.

Overall leadership by stage
Stage	Men		Women	
Stage	Winner	Overall standings	Winner	Overall standings
1	Johannes Høsflot Klæbo	Johannes Høsflot Klæbo	Hanna Falk	Hanna Falk
2	Alexander Bolshunov	Alexander Bolshunov	Krista Pärmäkoski	Marit Bjørgen
3	Alex Harvey	Alexander Bolshunov	Jessie Diggins	Marit Bjørgen
Final		Alexander Bolshunov	Final	Marit Bjørgen

== Overall standings ==
Men's overall standings (1–10)
Rank	Name	Time
1	Alexander Bolshunov (RUS)	1:13:40.3
2	Alex Harvey (CAN)	+47.1
3	Dario Cologna (SUI)	+47.5
4	Martin Johnsrud Sundby (NOR)	+48.7
5	Maxim Vylegzhanin (RUS)	+50.3
6	Hans Christer Holund (NOR)	+51.7
7	Calle Halfvarsson (SWE)	+54.1
8	Sjur Røthe (NOR)	+54.9
9	Niklas Dyrhaug (NOR)	+1:04.1
10	Denis Spitsov (RUS)	+1:04.2

Women's overall standings (1–10)
Rank	Name	Time
1	Marit Bjørgen (NOR)	52:34.2
2	Jessie Diggins (USA)	+16.7
3	Sadie Bjornsen (USA)	+1:11.5
4	Ragnhild Haga (NOR)	+1:12.0
5	Astrid Uhrenholdt Jacobsen (NOR)	+1:12.8
6	Krista Pärmäkoski (FIN)	+1:16.2
7	Charlotte Kalla (SWE)	+1:17.9
8	Ingvild Flugstad Østberg (NOR)	+1:19.0
9	Jonna Sundling (SWE)	+1:30.5
10	Ebba Andersson (SWE)	+1:44.7

== Stages ==
=== Stage 1 ===
16 March 2018

- The skiers qualification times count in the overall standings. Bonus seconds are awarded to the 30 skiers that qualifies for the quarter-finals, distributed as following:
  - Final: 30–27–24–23–22–21
  - Semi-final: 16–15–14–13–12–11
  - Quarter-final: 5–5–5–4–4–4–4–4–3–3–3–3–3–2–2–2–2–2

Men – 1.4 km Sprint Freestyle
Rank	Name	QT	Time	BS
1	Johannes Høsflot Klæbo (NOR)	2:36.69 (2)	2:37.03	30
2	Federico Pellegrino (ITA)	2:38.36 (4)	+0.39	27
3	Lucas Chanavat (FRA)	2:39.78 (11)	+1.76	24
4	Ristomatti Hakola (FIN)	2:40.77 (16)	+3.26	23
5	Oskar Svensson (SWE)	2:39.23 (8)	+3.88	22
6	Teodor Peterson (SWE)	2:39.57 (9)	+6.17	21
7	Francesco De Fabiani (ITA)	2:42.22 (21)		16
8	Viktor Thorn (SWE)	2:39.58 (10)		15
9	Alexander Bolshunov (RUS)	2:36.23 (1)		14
10	Karl-Johan Westberg (SWE)	2:38.51 (5)		13

Women – 1.4 km Sprint Freestyle
Rank	Name	QT	Time	BS
1	Hanna Falk (SWE)	2:59.88 (1)	3:08.25	30
2	Jonna Sundling (SWE)	3:03.68 (6)	+0.53	27
3	Marit Bjørgen (NOR)	3:03.60 (5)	+1.40	24
4	Anna Dyvik (SWE)	3:05.78 (8)	+1.72	23
5	Silje Øyre Slind (NOR)	3:10.55 (28)	+4.30	22
6	Sophie Caldwell (USA)	3:08.26 (16)	+6.99	21
7	Jessie Diggins (USA)	3:01.53 (2)		16
8	Maiken Caspersen Falla (NOR)	3:07.19 (11)		15
9	Sadie Bjornsen (USA)	3:02.84 (4)		14
10	Ida Ingemarsdotter (SWE)	3:09.26 (22)		13

=== Stage 2 ===
17 March 2018
Bonus seconds:

- Men: 2 intermediate sprints, bonus seconds to the 10 first skiers (15–12–10–8–6–5–4–3–2–1) past the intermediate points.
- Women: 1 intermediate sprint, bonus seconds to the 10 first skiers (15–12–10–8–6–5–4–3–2–1) past the intermediate point.
- Bonus seconds in finish: 15–10–5 to the 3 first skiers crossing the finish line.

Men – 15 km Classical (mass start)
Rank	Name	Time	BS
1	Alexander Bolshunov (RUS)	36:59.8	45
2	Calle Halfvarsson (SWE)	+1.3	12
3	Francesco De Fabiani (ITA)	+3.1	7
4	Alexey Poltoranin (KAZ)	+3.7	
5	Alexey Chervotkin (RUS)	+5.2	12
6	Dario Cologna (SUI)	+5.6	18
7	Federico Pellegrino (ITA)	+5.6	
8	Martin Johnsrud Sundby (NOR)	+6.3	14
9	Niklas Dyrhaug (NOR)	+6.3	3
10	Sjur Røthe (NOR)	+6.4	4

Women – 10 km Classical (mass start)
Rank	Name	Time	BS
1	Krista Pärmäkoski (FIN)	26:00.5	15
2	Marit Bjørgen (NOR)	+0.2	25
3	Ingvild Flugstad Østberg (NOR)	+5.1	17
4	Ebba Andersson (SWE)	+14.5	
5	Masako Ishida (JPN)	+14.8	
6	Charlotte Kalla (SWE)	+15.2	6
7	Teresa Stadlober (AUT)	+15.4	
8	Jessie Diggins (USA)	+15.5	5
9	Astrid Uhrenholdt Jacobsen (NOR)	+24.8	10
10	Kerttu Niskanen (FIN)	+26.2	

=== Stage 3 ===
18 March 2018

- The race for "Winner of the Day" counts for 2017–18 FIS Cross-Country World Cup points. No bonus seconds are awarded on this stage.

Men – 15 km Freestyle (pursuit)
Rank	Name	Time
1	Alex Harvey (CAN)	34:34.3
2	Hans Christer Holund (NOR)	+1.0
3	Maxim Vylegzhanin (RUS)	+6.7
4	Giandomenico Salvadori (ITA)	+10.5
4	Simen Hegstad Krüger (NOR)	+10.5
6	Denis Spitsov (RUS)	+10.6
7	Sjur Røthe (NOR)	+11.2
8	Marcus Hellner (SWE)	+13.3
9	Daniel Rickardsson (SWE)	+15.5
10	Andrey Larkov (RUS)	+16.0

Women – 10 km Freestyle (pursuit)
Rank	Name	Time
1	Jessie Diggins (USA)	23:54.4
2	Ragnhild Haga (NOR)	+10.7
3	Marit Bjørgen (NOR)	+24.5
4	Astrid Uhrenholdt Jacobsen (NOR)	+35.0
5	Sadie Bjornsen (USA)	+38.7
6	Charlotte Kalla (SWE)	+45.3
7	Victoria Carl (GER)	+49.8
8	Ebba Andersson (SWE)	+55.8
9	Jonna Sundling (SWE)	+56.5
10	Krista Pärmäkoski (FIN)	+57.3

== World Cup points distribution ==
The overall winners were awarded 200 points. The winners of each of the three stages are awarded 50 points. The maximum number of points an athlete can earn is therefore 350 points.

Position	1	2	3	4	5	6	7	8	9	10	11	12	13	14	15	16	17	18	19	20	21	22	23	24	25	26	27	28	29	30
Overall	200	160	120	100	90	80	72	64	58	52	48	44	40	36	32	30	28	26	24	22	20	18	16	14	12	10	8	6	4	2
Stage	50	46	43	40	37	34	32	30	28	26	24	22	20	18	16	15	14	13	12	11	10	9	8	7	6	5	4	3	2	1
