= Heussler =

Heussler is a surname. Notable people with the surname include:

- Bob Heussler, American sports announcer
- John Heussler (1820–1907), Johann Christian Heussler, politician in Queensland, Australia
- Olivia Heussler (born 1957), Swiss photographer

== See also ==
- Hessler
