= Hessler =

Hessler is a surname. Notable people with the surname include:

- Alexander Hessler (1823–1895), American photographer
- Cort Hessler, American assistant director and stuntman
- Georg Hessler (1427–1482), German Roman Catholic cardinal and bishop
- Gerd Hessler (born 1948), German cross country skier
- Gordon Hessler (1925–2014), British film and television director
- Hans-Joachim Hessler (born 1968), German composer, musician and musicologist
- Pauline Heßler (born 1998), German ski jumper
- Peter Hessler (born 1969), American writer and journalist
- Rowe Hessler (born 1991), American speedcuber
- Vanessa Hessler (born 1988), American-Italian model and actress

== See also ==
- Hessler Peak, sharp peak in the Heritage Range in Antarctica
- Hessler Road, in Cleveland, Ohio, United States
