= Chervotkin =

Chervotkin (masculine, Russian: Червоткин) or Chervotkina (feminine, Russian: Червоткина) is a Russian-language surname. Notable people with the surname include:

- Aleksey Chervotkin (born 1995), Russian cross-country skier
- Nelli Chervotkina (born 1965), Soviet pair skater
