= 2013 Nordic Junior World Ski Championships =

International skiing competition

FIS Nordic Junior and U23 World Ski Championships 2013
- Host city: Liberec, Czech Republic
- Events: 21
- Opening: 20 January
- Closing: 27 January
- Main venue: Vesec

The FIS Nordic Junior and U23 World Ski Championships 2013 took place in Liberec, Czech Republic from 20 January to 27 January 2013. It was the 36th Junior World Championships and the 8th Under-23 World Championships in Nordic skiing.

== Medal summary ==
=== Junior events ===
==== Cross-country skiing ====
Event	Gold		Silver		Bronze	
Men's Junior Events
Men's junior sprint classic	Lennart Metz; Germany		Vadim Korolev; Russia	+2.6	Bjørn Vidar Suhr; Norway	+4.6
Men's junior 10 km free	Dmitriy Rostovtsev; Russia	23:32.5	Artem Maltsev; Russia	23:49.3	Martin Weisheit; Germany	23:50.1
Men's junior 20 km skiathlon	Dmitriy Rostovtsev; Russia	47:40.2	Artem Maltsev; Russia	47:44.1	Aleksey Chervotkin; Russia	47:45.4
Men's junior 4 × 5 km relay	Russia; Aleksey Chervotkin; Artem Maltsev; Roman Tarasov; Dmitriy Rostovtsev	45:35.5	Norway; Bjørn Vidar Suhr; Simen Hegstad Krüger; Magne Haga; Håvard Solås Taugbøl	45:54.2	Sweden; Oskar Svensson; Marcus Ruus; Oscar Ivars; Rasmus Hörnfeldt	46:27.6
Ladies' Junior Events
Ladies' junior sprint classic	Stina Nilsson; Sweden		Victoria Carl; Germany	+1.9	Evgenia Oschepkova; Russia	+2.5
Ladies' junior 5 km free	Victoria Carl; Germany	12:35.3	Teresa Stadlober; Austria	12:39.6	Anastasia Sedova; Russia	12:46.7
Ladies' junior 10 km skiathlon	Teresa Stadlober; Austria	27:13.0	Nadezhda Shuniaeva; Russia	27:19.6	Alisa Zhambalova; Russia	27:23.9
Ladies' junior 4 × 3.33 km relay	Sweden; Julia Svan; Sofia Henriksson; Jonna Sundling; Stina Nilsson	35:41.1	Russia; Alisa Zhambalova; Natalya Nepryayeva; Anastasia Sedova; Nadezhda Shuniaeva	35:43.3	Germany; Laura Gimmler; Katharina Hennig; Julia Belger; Victoria Carl	36:31.4

==== Nordic Combined ====
Event	Gold		Silver		Bronze	
Normal hill/10 km	Manuel Faisst; Germany	24:51.0	David Welde; Germany	25:02.3	Han-Hendrik Piho; Estonia	25:10.5
Normal hill/5 km	Manuel Faisst; Germany	11:49.4	Theo Hannon; France	11:52.0	Kristjan Ilves; Estonia	12:14.6
Team normal hill/4 × 5 km	Germany; Michael Schuller; Jakob Lange; David Welde; Manuel Faisst	47:46.9	Austria; Franz-Josef Rehrl; Paul Gerstgraser; Thomas Wolfgang Jöbstl; Philipp Orter	47:56.9	Japan; Go Yamamoto; Go Sonehara; Shoto Horigome; Takehiro Watanabe	48:49.8

==== Ski jumping ====
Event	Gold		Silver		Bronze	
Men's Junior Events
Men's junior individual normal hill	Jaka Hvala; Slovenia	283.5	Klemens Murańka; Poland	264.0	Stefan Kraft; Austria	258.5
Men's junior team normal hill	Slovenia; Anže Semenič; Ernest Prišlič; Cene Prevc; Jaka Hvala	1086.5	Poland; Bartlomiej Klusek; Krzysztof Biegun; Aleksander Zniszczoł; Klemens Murańka	1062.0	Germany; Karl Geiger; Michael Dreher; Tobias Löffler; Andreas Wellinger	1038.5
Ladies' Junior Events
Ladies' junior normal hill	Sara Takanashi; Japan	268.0	Evelyn Insam; Italy	259.5	Katja Požun; Slovenia	253.5
Ladies' junior team normal hill	Slovenia; Urša Bogataj; Barbara Klinec; Špela Rogelj; Katja Požun	1009.0	France; Léa Lemare; Océane Avocat Gros; Julia Clair; Coline Mattel	787.0	Germany; Ramona Straub; Pauline Hessler; Svenja Würth; Katharina Althaus	762.0

=== Under-23 events ===
==== Cross-country skiing ====
Event	Gold		Silver		Bronze	
Men's Under-23 Events
Men's under-23 sprint classic	Federico Pellegrino; Italy		Juho Mikkonen; Finland		Evgeniy Belov; Russia	
Men's under-23 15 kilometre free	Sergey Ustiugov; Russia	35:44.1	Evgeniy Belov; Russia	36:03.8	Thomas Bing; Germany	36:26.5
Men's under-23 30 kilometre skiathlon	Sergey Ustiugov; Russia	1:11:37.1	Evgeniy Belov; Russia	1:11:39.6	Mark Starostin; Kazakhstan	1:12:09.5
Ladies' Under-23 Events
Ladies' under-23 sprint classic	Elena Soboleva; Russia		Sandra Ringwald; Germany		Hanna Kolb; Germany	
Ladies' under-23 10 kilometre free	Ragnhild Haga; Norway	27:50.4	Anastasia Slonova; Kazakhstan	28:19.9	Debora Agreiter; Italy	28:20.3
Ladies' under-23 15 kilometre skiathlon	Ragnhild Haga; Norway	40:16.9	Debora Agreiter; Italy	40:18.0	Kari Øyre Slind; Norway	40:19.2

=== Medal table ===
Rank	Nation	Gold	Silver	Bronze	Total
1	Russia (RUS)	6	7	5	18
2	Germany (GER)	5	3	6	14
3	Slovenia (SLO)	3	0	1	4
4	Norway (NOR)	2	1	2	5
5	Sweden (SWE)	2	0	1	3
6	Austria (AUT)	1	2	1	4
6	Italy (ITA)	1	2	1	4
8	Japan (JPN)	1	0	1	2
9	France (FRA)	0	2	0	2
9	Poland (POL)	0	2	0	2
11	Kazakhstan (KAZ)	0	1	1	2
12	Finland (FIN)	0	1	0	1
13	Estonia (EST)	0	0	2	2
Totals (13 entries)		21	21	21	63
