= Adrien Backscheider =

French cross-country skier (born 1992)

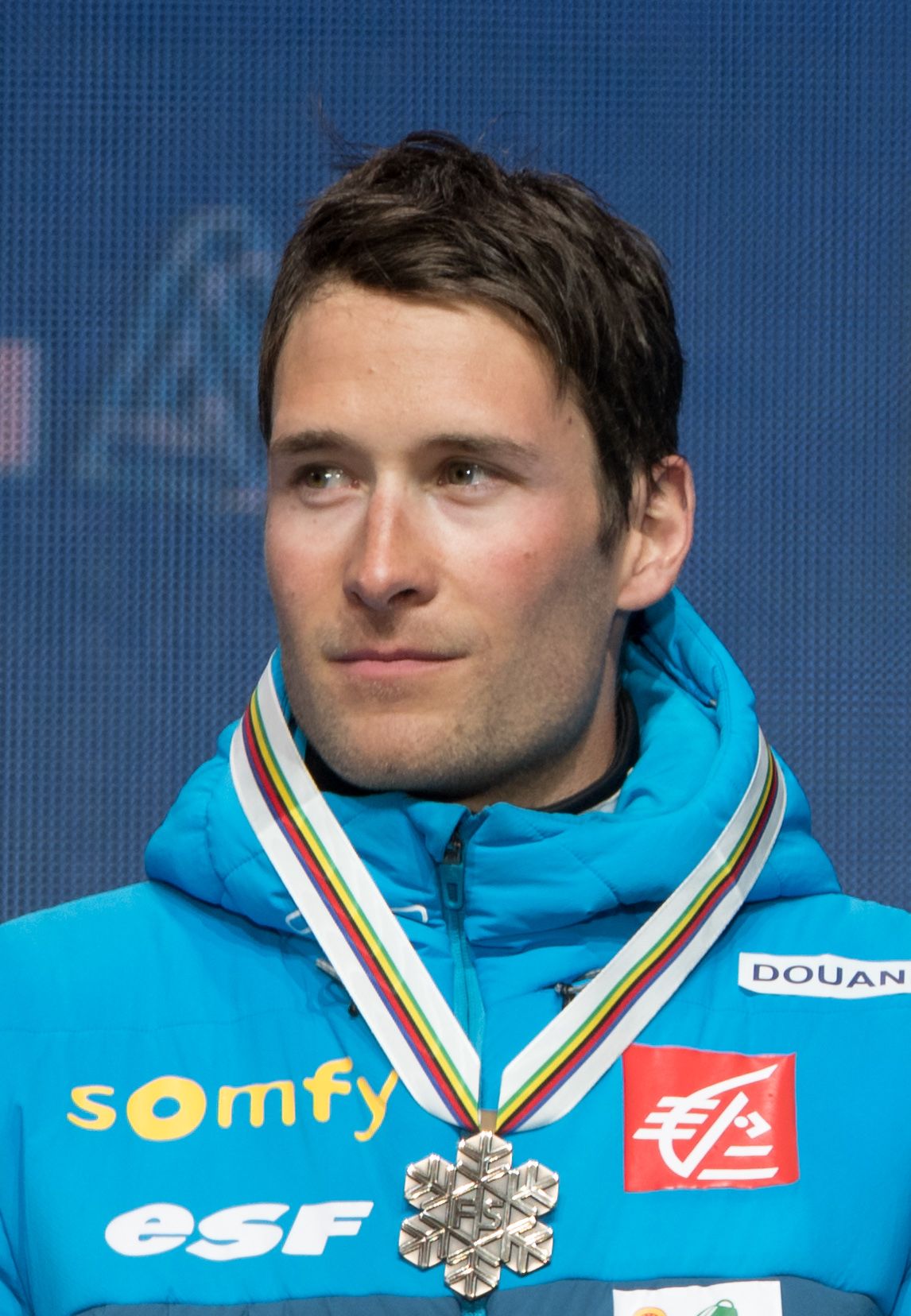
- Backscheider in 2019

Personal information
- Nationality: France
- Born: 7 August 1992 (age 33) Metz, France
- Height: 1.78 m (5 ft 10 in)

Sport
- Sport: Skiing
- Club: Gérardmer Ski Nordique

World Cup career
- Seasons: 10 – (2013–2022)
- Indiv. starts: 116
- Indiv. podiums: 0
- Team starts: 4
- Team podiums: 0
- Overall titles: 0 – (32nd in 2020)
- Discipline titles: 0
Medal record
Men's cross-country skiing
Representing France
Olympic Games
Bronze medal – third place	2018 Pyeongchang	4 × 10 km relay
World Championships
Bronze medal – third place	2015 Falun	4 × 10 km relay
Bronze medal – third place	2019 Seefeld	4 × 10 km relay
U23 World Championships
Gold medal – first place	2014 Val di Fiemme	30 km skiathlon
Bronze medal – third place	2015 Almaty	15 km freestyle
- Updated on 21 March 2022

Adrien Backscheider (born 7 August 1992) is a French cross-country skier. He competed for France at the 2014 and 2018 Winter Olympics in the cross-country skiing events.

== Cross-country skiing results ==
All results are sourced from the International Ski Federation (FIS).

=== Olympic Games ===
- 1 medal – (1 bronze)

Year	Age	15 km individual	30 km skiathlon	50 km mass start	Sprint	4 × 10 km relay	Team sprint
2014	22	43	—	—	—	—	—
2018	26	17	—	—	—	Bronze	—
2022	30	—	—	34^{[a]}	—	—	—

^{a} Distance reduced to 30 km due to weather conditions.

=== World Championships ===
- 2 medals – (2 bronze)

Year	Age	15 km individual	30 km skiathlon	50 km mass start	Sprint	4 × 10 km relay	Team sprint
2015	23	—	19	—	—	Bronze	—
2019	27	—	8	9	—	Bronze	—
2021	29	22	—	—	—	—	—

=== World Cup ===
==== Season standings ====
Season	Age	Discipline standings				Ski Tour standings				
Season	Age	Overall	Distance	Sprint	U23	Nordic Opening	Tour de Ski	Ski Tour 2020	World Cup Final	Ski Tour Canada
2013	21	NC	NC	—	—N/a	—	—	—N/a	—	—N/a
2014	22	95	78	NC	—N/a	69	DNF	—N/a	18	—N/a
2015	23	156	95	—	27	—	—	—N/a	—N/a	—N/a
2016	24	91	53	NC	—N/a	49	34	—N/a	—N/a	—
2017	25	161	112	NC	—N/a	40	—	—N/a	34	—N/a
2018	26	76	44	NC	—N/a	—	DNF	—N/a	32	—N/a
2019	27	39	30	67	—N/a	19	25	—N/a	23	—N/a
2020	28	32	24	84	—N/a	49	19	DNF	—N/a	—N/a
2021	29	36	31	NC	—N/a	50	13	—N/a	—N/a	—N/a
2022	30	115	66	NC	—N/a	—N/a	DNF	—N/a	—N/a	—N/a
