= 2017 Nordic Junior World Ski Championships =

International skiing competition

FIS Nordic Junior and U23 World Ski Championships 2017
- Host city: Park City, United States
- Events: 22
- Opening: 30 January
- Closing: 5 February
- Main venue: Utah Olympic Park, Soldier Hollow
- Website: Utah2017.com

The FIS Nordic Junior and U23 World Ski Championships 2017 took place in Park City, United States from 30 January to 5 February 2017. It was the 40th Junior World Championships and the 12th Under-23 World Championships in Nordic skiing.

== Schedule ==
All times are local (UTC-7).

Cross-country

Date	Time	Event
30 January	12:00	Men's junior sprint Ladies' junior sprint
31 January	12:00	Men's under-23 sprint Ladies' under-23 sprint
1 February	10:00	Ladies' junior 5 km free
1 February	12:00	Men's junior 10 km free
2 February	10:00	Ladies' under-23 10 km free
2 February	12:00	Men's under-23 15 km free
3 February	10:00	Ladies' junior 10 km skiathlon
3 February	12:00	Men's junior 20 km skiathlon
4 February	10:00	Ladies' under-23 15 km skiathlon
4 February	12:00	Men's under-23 30 km skiathlon
5 February	10:00	Ladies' junior 4×3.33 km relay
5 February	12:00	Men's junior 4×5 km relay

Nordic combined

Date	Time	Event
31 January	10:00; 15:30	HS100 / 10 km
2 February	10:00; 15:30	Team HS100 / 4x5 km
4 February	10:00; 15:30	HS100 / 5 km

Ski jumping

Date	Time	Event
1 February	12:00	Ladies' HS100
1 February	15:00	Men's HS100
3 February	12:15	Ladies' team HS100
3 February	15:00	Men's team HS100
5 February	14:00	Mixed team HS100

== Medal summary ==
=== Junior events ===
==== Cross-country skiing ====
Event	Gold		Silver		Bronze	
Men's Junior Events
Men's junior sprint classic	Janosch Brugger; Germany	3:43.00	Petter Stakston; Norway	3:43.04	Herman Martens Meyer; Norway	3:46.83
Men's junior 10 kilometre free	Vladislav Vechkanov; Russia	23:08.6	Egor Kazarinov; Russia	23:16.5	Yaroslav Rybochkin; Russia	23:21.9
Men's junior 20 kilometre skiathlon	Vladislav Vechkanov; Russia	49:40.5	Thomas Helland Larsen; Norway	49:42.4	Harald Østberg Amundsen; Norway	49:42.7
Men's junior 4 × 5 kilometre relay	Norway; Herman Martens Meyer; Jon Rolf Skamo Hope; Harald Østberg Amundsen; Thomas Helland Larsen	49:36.1	Russia; Egor Kazarinov; Kirill Kilivnyuk; Yaroslav Rybochkin; Vladislav Vechanov	49:36.5	France; Martin Collet; Camille Laude; Hugo Lapalus; Arnaud Chautemps	50:41.5
Ladies' Junior Events
Ladies' junior sprint classic	Polina Nekrasova; Russia	3:34.60	Antonia Fräbel; Germany	3:38.16	Coletta Rydzek; Germany	3:39.16
Ladies' junior 5 kilometre free	Ebba Andersson; Sweden	12:45.4	Marte Mæhlum Johansen; Norway	12:59.2	Mariya Istomina; Russia	13:00.7
Ladies' junior 10 kilometre skiathlon	Marte Mæhlum Johansen; Norway	27:17.3	Ebba Andersson; Sweden	27:23.9	Katharine Ogden; United States	27:27.7
Ladies' junior 4 × 3.33 kilometre relay	Russia; Polina Nekrasova; Lidia Durkina; Anna Zherebyateva; Mariya Istomina	34:45.3	Italy; Martina Bellini; Anna Comarella; Francesca Franchi; Cristina Pittin	35:05.9	United States; Hailey Swirbul; Julia Kern; Hannah Halvorsen; Katharine Ogden	35:11.2

==== Nordic combined ====
Event	Gold		Silver		Bronze	
Individual normal hill/10 km	Arttu Mäkiaho; Finland	25:54.5	Mika Vermeulen; Austria	26:16.1	Martin Hahn; Germany	26:20.1
Individual normal hill/5 km	Vinzenz Geiger; Germany	12:14.9	Arttu Mäkiaho; Finland	12:37.5	Laurent Muhlethaler; France	12:38.8
Team normal hill/4 × 5 km	Austria; Samuel Mraz; Marc-Luis Rainer; Florian Dagn; Mika Vermeulen	46:17.3	France; Lilian Vaxelaire; Laurent Muhlethaler; Théo Rochat; Maël Tyrode	46:27.0	Czech Republic; Ondřej Pažout; David Zemek; Jan Vytrval; Lukáš Daněk	46:32.6

==== Ski jumping ====
Event	Gold		Silver		Bronze	
Men's Junior Events
Men's junior individual normal hill	Viktor Polášek; Czech Republic	263.2	Alex Insam; Italy	260.6	Constantin Schmid; Germany	260.4
Men's junior team normal hill	Slovenia; Žiga Jelar; Tilen Bartol; Aljaž Osterc; Bor Pavlovčič	932.3	Germany; Martin Hamann; Tim Fuchs; Felix Hoffman; Constantin Schmid	929.0	Austria; Markus Rupitsch; Mika Schwann; Clemens Leitner; Janni Reisenauer	870.8
Ladies' Junior Events
Ladies' junior individual normal hill	Manuela Malsiner; Italy	239.8	Ema Klinec; Slovenia	238.0	Nika Križnar; Slovenia	237.9
Ladies' junior team normal hill	Germany; Agnes Reisch; Luisa Görlich; Pauline Heßler; Gianina Ernst	772.1	Slovenia; Jerneja Brecl; Katra Komar; Nika Križnar; Ema Klinec	733.2	Austria; Claudia Purker; Sophie Mair; Elisabeth Raudaschl; Julia Huber	672.9
Mixed Junior Events
Mixed junior team normal hill	Slovenia; Nika Križnar; Tilen Bartol; Ema Klinec; Žiga Jelar	925.3	Germany; Agnes Reisch; Martin Hamann; Gianina Ernst; Constantin Schmid	890.6	Japan; Minami Watanabe; Masamitsu Itō; Fumika Segawa; Yuken Iwasa	840.5

=== Under-23 events ===
==== Cross-country skiing ====
Event	Gold		Silver		Bronze	
Men's Under-23 Events
Men's under-23 sprint classic	Fredrik Riseth; Norway	3:32.78	Alexander Bolshunov; Russia	3:33.83	Joachim Aurland; Norway	3:35.08
Men's under-23 15 kilometre free	Alexander Bolshunov; Russia	32:55.7	Aleksey Chervotkin; Russia	33:17.5	Denis Spitsov; Russia	33:23.9
Men's under-23 30 kilometre skiathlon	Alexander Bolshunov; Russia	1:15:31.5	Aleksey Chervotkin; Russia	1:15:31.7	Denis Spitsov; Russia	1:15:32.0
Ladies' Under-23 Events
Ladies' under-23 sprint classic	Anna Dyvik; Sweden	3:32.40	Thea Krokan Murud; Norway	3:35.82	Maja Dahlqvist; Sweden	3:36.16
Ladies' under-23 10 kilometre free	Anna Dyvik; Sweden	26:14.0	Tiril Udnes Weng; Norway	26:30.8	Lovise Heimdal; Norway	26:37.0
Ladies' under-23 15 kilometre skiathlon	Lotta Udnes Weng; Norway	40:50.9	Johanna Matintalo; Finland	40:54.7	Yana Kirpichenko; Russia	41:04.8

=== Medal table ===
* Host nation (United States)

Rank	Nation	Gold	Silver	Bronze	Total
1	Russia (RUS)	6	5	5	16
2	Norway (NOR)	4	5	4	13
3	Germany (GER)	3	3	3	9
4	Sweden (SWE)	3	1	1	5
5	Slovenia (SLO)	2	2	1	5
6	Finland (FIN)	1	2	0	3
6	Italy (ITA)	1	2	0	3
8	Austria (AUT)	1	1	2	4
9	Czech Republic (CZE)	1	0	1	2
10	France (FRA)	0	1	2	3
11	United States (USA)*	0	0	2	2
12	Japan (JPN)	0	0	1	1
Totals (12 entries)		22	22	22	66
