= Nathalie von Siebenthal =

Swiss cross-country skier

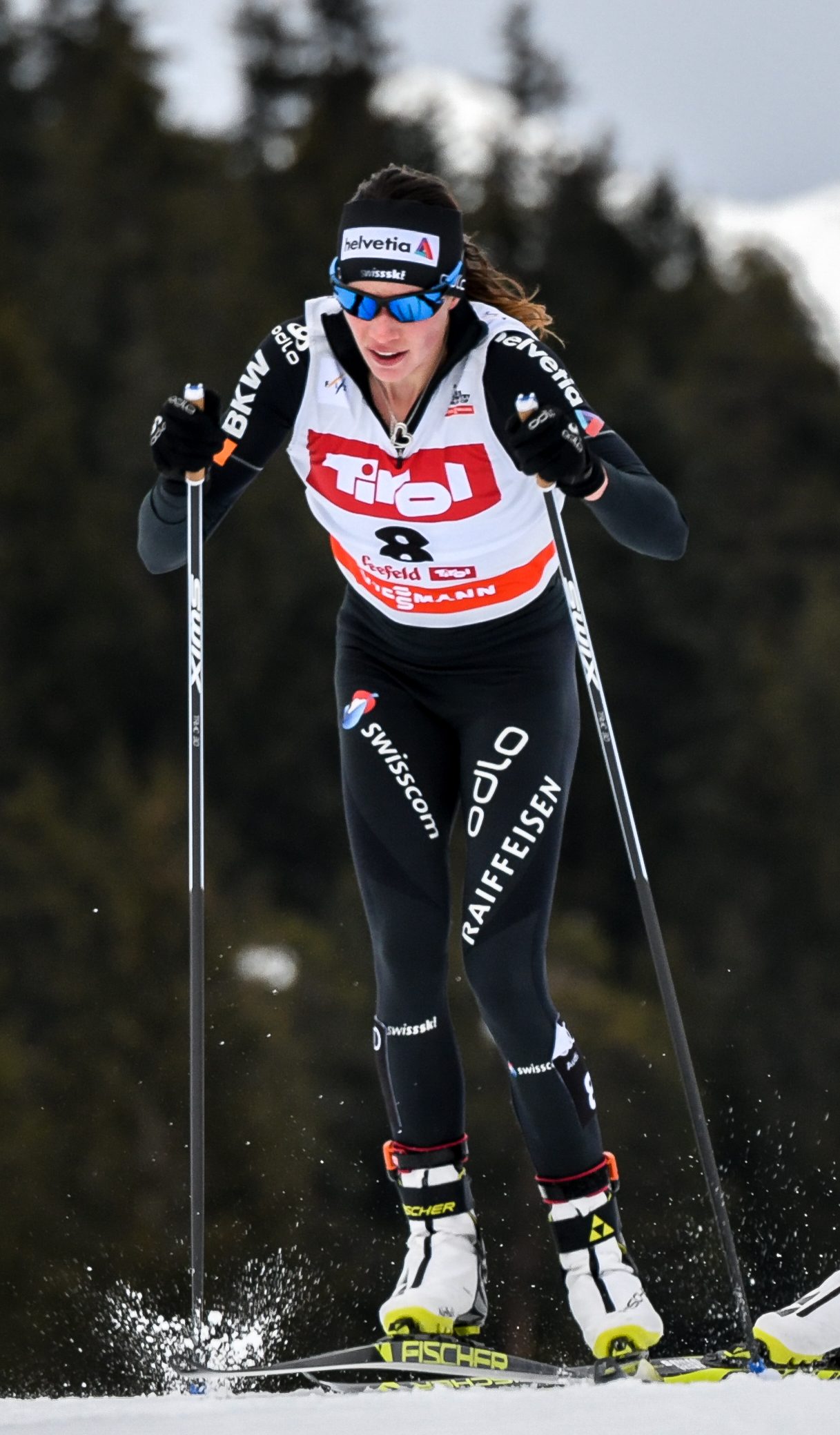
- Von Siebenthal during FIS World Cup competitions in Seefeld, Austria in January 2018

Personal information
- Full name: Nathalie von Siebenthal
- Born: 30 September 1993 (age 32)

Sport
- Sport: Skiing
- Club: Turbach-Bissen

World Cup career
- Seasons: 6 – (2014–2019)
- Indiv. starts: 109
- Indiv. podiums: 0
- Indiv. wins: 0
- Team starts: 2
- Team podiums: 0
- Team wins: 0
- Overall titles: 0 – (17th in 2017 & 2018)
- Discipline titles: 0
Medal record
Women's cross-country skiing
Representing Switzerland
U23 World Championships
Gold medal – first place	2015 Almaty	15 km skiathlon
Bronze medal – third place	2015 Almaty	10 km freestyle
- Updated on 24 March 2019

Nathalie von Siebenthal (born 30 September 1993) is a former Swiss cross-country skier. She competed in the World Cup 2015 season.

She represented Switzerland at the FIS Nordic World Ski Championships 2015 in Falun, Sweden.

On 23 October 2019, she announced her retirement from cross-country skiing.

== Cross-country skiing results ==
All results are sourced from the International Ski Federation (FIS).

=== Olympic Games ===
Year	Age	10 km individual	15 km skiathlon	30 km mass start	Sprint	4 × 5 km relay	Team sprint
2018	24	6	6	22	—	7	—

=== World Championships ===
Year	Age	10 km individual	15 km skiathlon	30 km mass start	Sprint	4 × 5 km relay	Team sprint
2015	21	6	22	23	—	—	—
2017	23	30	4	11	—	7	—
2019	25	—	18	7	—	10	—

=== World Cup ===
==== Season standings ====
Season	Age	Discipline standings				Ski Tour standings			
Season	Age	Overall	Distance	Sprint	U23	Nordic Opening	Tour de Ski	World Cup Final	Ski Tour Canada
2014	20	NC	NC	—	—N/a	—	—	—	—N/a
2015	21	48	38	NC	3rd place, bronze medalist(s)	—	17	—N/a	—N/a
2016	22	18	12	62	2nd place, silver medalist(s)	25	15	—N/a	13
2017	23	17	13	59	—N/a	35	8	25	—N/a
2018	24	17	12	66	—N/a	30	8	31	—N/a
2019	25	28	17	58	—N/a	25	15	40	—N/a
