= 2015 Nordic Junior World Ski Championships =

Ski event in Almaty, Kazakhstan

FIS Nordic Junior and U23 World Ski Championships 2015
- Host city: Almaty, Kazakhstan
- Events: 21
- Opening: 3 February
- Closing: 8 February
- Main venue: Sunkar; International Ski Jump Complex

The FIS Nordic Junior and U23 World Ski Championships 2015 took place in Almaty, Kazakhstan from 3 February to 8 February 2015. It was the 38th Junior World Championships and the 10th Under-23 World Championships in Nordic skiing.

== Medal summary ==
=== Junior events ===
==== Cross-country skiing ====
Event	Gold		Silver		Bronze	
Men's Junior Events
Men's junior sprint classic	Fredrik Riseth; Norway	3:01.25	Alexander Bakanov; Russia	3:06.10	Johannes Høsflot Klæbo; Norway	3:09.25
Men's junior 10 km free	Aleksey Chervotkin; Russia	23:36.4	Denis Spitsov; Russia	23:52.3	Alexander Bakanov; Russia	24:10.8
Men's junior 20 km skiathlon	Aleksey Chervotkin; Russia	48:53.3	Ivan Yakimushkin; Russia	48:54.9	Denis Spitsov; Russia	48:55.8
Men's junior 4 × 5 km relay	Russia; Alexander Bakanov; Ivan Yakimushkin; Denis Spitsov; Aleksey Chervotkin	45:11.0	France; Valentin Chauvin; Jules Lapierre; Jean Tiberghien; Louis Schwartz	45:28.3	Norway; Johannes Høsflot Klæbo; Ole Jørgen Bruvoll; Audun Erikstad; Gaute Kvåle	46:12.5
Ladies' Junior Events
Ladies' junior sprint classic	Victoria Carl; Germany	3:29.01	Yuliya Belorukova; Russia	3:30.65	Natalya Nepryayeva; Russia	3:31.19
Ladies' junior 5 km free	Victoria Carl; Germany	13:26.9	Anastasia Sedova; Russia	13:32.2	Natalya Nepryayeva; Russia	13:32.8
Ladies' junior 10 km skiathlon free	Sofie Nordsveen Hustad; Norway	27:02.8	Victoria Carl; Germany	27:04.8	Ebba Andersson; Sweden	27:09.6
Ladies' junior 4 × 3.33 km relay	Norway; Tiril Udnes Weng; Julie Myhre; Sofie Nordsveen Hustad; Lotta Udnes Weng	35:04.0	Russia; Yana Kirpichenko; Natalya Nepryayeva; Anastasia Sedova; Yuliya Belorukova	35:04.4	Germany; Nadine Herrmann; Katharina Hennig; Sofie Krehl; Victoria Carl	35:39.3

==== Nordic Combined ====
Event	Gold		Silver		Bronze	
Normal hill/10 km	Jarl Magnus Riiber; Norway	25:54.2	Paul Gerstgraser; Austria	26:01.5	Jakob Lange; Germany	26:01.8
Normal hill/5 km	Jarl Magnus Riiber; Norway	12:21.8	Jakob Lange; Germany	13:09.2	Kristjan Ilves; Estonia	13:10.1
Team normal hill/4 × 5 km	Austria; Thomas Wofgang Jöbstl; Bernhard Flaschberger; Noa Ian Mraz; Paul Gerstgraser	48:41.4	Germany; Phillip Mauersberger; Terence Weber; Paul Hanf; Jakob Lange	48:57.4	Norway; Simen Tiller; Harald Jonas Riiber; Jarl Magnus Riiber; Lars Buraas	49:31.1

==== Ski jumping ====
Event	Gold		Silver		Bronze	
Men's Junior Events
Men's junior individual normal hill	Johann André Forfang; Norway	269.9	Andreas Wellinger; Germany	269.4	Phillip Sjøen; Norway	266.0
Men's junior team normal hill	Norway; Joacim Ødegård Bjøreng; Halvor Egner Granerud; Phillip Sjøen; Johann André Forfang	893.3	Germany; Paul Winter; Martin Hamann; Sebastian Bradatsch; Andreas Wellinger	869.6	Austria; Elias Tollinger; Patrick Streitler; Philipp Aschenwald; Simon Greiderer	837.4
Ladies' Junior Events
Ladies' junior normal hill	Sofia Tikhonova; Russia	227.5	Elisabeth Raudaschl; Austria	221.7	Chiara Hölzl; Austria	217.4
Ladies' junior team normal hill	Germany; Henriette Kraus; Pauline Hessler; Anna Rupprecht; Gianina Ernst	769.1	Russia; Daria Grushina; Alexandra Kustova; Mariya Iakovleva; Sofia Tikhonova	723.2	Japan; Nozomi Maruyama; Yurina Yamada; Shihori Ōi; Yūka Setō	696.9

=== Under-23 events ===
==== Cross-country skiing ====
Event	Gold		Silver		Bronze	
Men's Under-23 Events
Men's under-23 sprint classic	Sondre Turvoll Fossli; Norway	2:56.46	Sindre Bjørnestad Skar; Norway	2:58.48	Ermil Vokuev; Russia	2:59.88
Men's under-23 15 kilometre free	Florian Notz; Germany	35:55.3	Simen Hegstad Krüger; Norway	36:04.8	Adrien Backscheider; France	36:22.0
Men's under-23 30 kilometre skiathlon	Magne Haga; Norway	1:19:26.3	Clément Parisse; France	1:19:26.9	Dmitriy Rostovtsev; Russia	1:19:28.9
Ladies' Under-23 Events
Ladies' under-23 sprint classic	Francesca Baudin; Italy	3:27.66	Silje Theodorsen; Norway	3:28.14	Giulia Stürz; Italy	3:29.25
Ladies' under-23 10 kilometre free	Barbro Kvåle; Norway	27:20.3	Daria Storozhilova; Russia	27:26.1	Nathalie von Siebenthal; Switzerland	27:26.7
Ladies' under-23 15 kilometre skiathlon	Nathalie von Siebenthal; Switzerland	41:00.0	Barbro Kvåle; Norway	41:22.5	Giulia Stürz; Italy	41:26.1

=== Medal table ===
Rank	Nation	Gold	Silver	Bronze	Total
1	Norway (NOR)	10	4	4	18
2	Russia (RUS)	4	8	6	18
3	Germany (GER)	4	5	2	11
4	Austria (AUT)	1	2	2	5
5	Italy (ITA)	1	0	2	3
6	Switzerland (SUI)	1	0	1	2
7	France (FRA)	0	2	1	3
8	Estonia (EST)	0	0	1	1
8	Japan (JPN)	0	0	1	1
8	Sweden (SWE)	0	0	1	1
Totals (10 entries)		21	21	21	63
