= Anna Dyvik =

Swedish cross-country skier

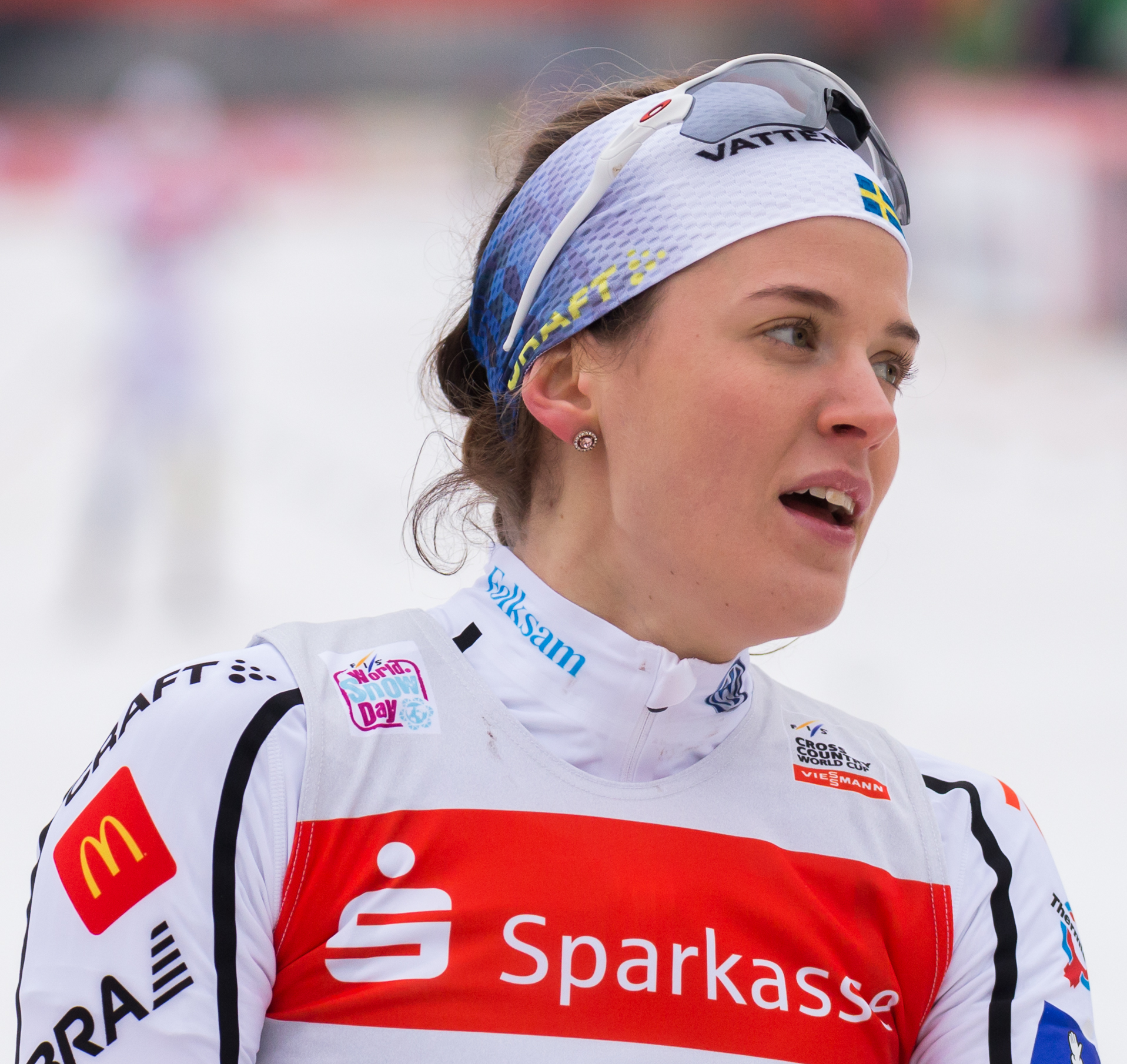
- Anna Dyvik in Dresden, 2018

Personal information
- Full name: Anna Maria Dyvik
- Nationality: Sweden
- Born: 31 December 1994 (age 31) Leksand, Sweden

Sport
- Sport: Skiing
- Club: IFK Mora SK

World Cup career
- Seasons: 8 – (2016–2023)
- Indiv. starts: 64
- Indiv. podiums: 0
- Team starts: 3
- Team podiums: 1
- Team wins: 0
- Overall titles: 0 – (28th in 2018)
- Discipline titles: 0
Medal record
Women's cross-country skiing
Representing Sweden
U23 World Championships
Gold medal – first place	2017 Park City	10 km freestyle
Gold medal – first place	2017 Park City	Individual sprint
Junior World Championships
Gold medal – first place	2014 Val di Fiemme	4 × 3.33 km relay
Bronze medal – third place	2014 Val di Fiemme	10 km skiathlon

Anna Dyvik (born 31 December 1994) is a retired Swedish cross-country skier who represented the club IFK Mora SK.

She competed at the FIS Nordic World Ski Championships 2017 in Lahti, Finland.

On 17 March 2023, Dyvik announced her retirement from cross-country skiing following the 2022–23 season.

== Cross-country skiing results ==
All results are sourced from the International Ski Federation (FIS).

=== Olympic Games ===
Year	Age	10 km individual	15 km skiathlon	30 km mass start	Sprint	4 × 5 km relay	Team sprint
2018	23	—	—	—	12	—	—
2022	27	—	—	—	17	—	—

=== World Championships ===
Year	Age	10 km individual	15 km skiathlon	30 km mass start	Sprint	4 × 5 km relay	Team sprint
2017	22	—	—	—	27	—	—

=== World Cup ===
==== Season standings ====
Season	Age	Discipline standings				Ski Tour standings				
Season	Age	Overall	Distance	Sprint	U23	Nordic Opening	Tour de Ski	Ski Tour 2020	World Cup Final	Ski Tour Canada
2016	21	NC	—	NC	NC	—	—	—N/a	—N/a	—
2017	22	51	58	33	7	—	—	—N/a	24	—N/a
2018	23	28	63	11	—N/a	45	—	—N/a	24	—N/a
2019	24	62	60	39	—N/a	23	—	—N/a	—	—N/a
2020	25	45	34	31	—N/a	—	—	32	—N/a	—N/a
2021	26	40	41	32	—N/a	18	—	—N/a	—N/a	—N/a
2022	27	30	57	15	—N/a	—N/a	DNF	—N/a	—N/a	—N/a
2023	28	65	65	54	—N/a	—N/a	30	—N/a	—N/a	—N/a

==== Team podiums ====
- 1 podium – (1 RL)

No.	Season	Date	Location	Race	Level	Place	Teammates
1	2016–17	18 December 2016	La Clusaz, France	4 × 5 km Relay C/F	World Cup	3rd	Wikén / Nilsson / Rydqvist
