= Lotta Udnes Weng =

Norwegian cross-country skier

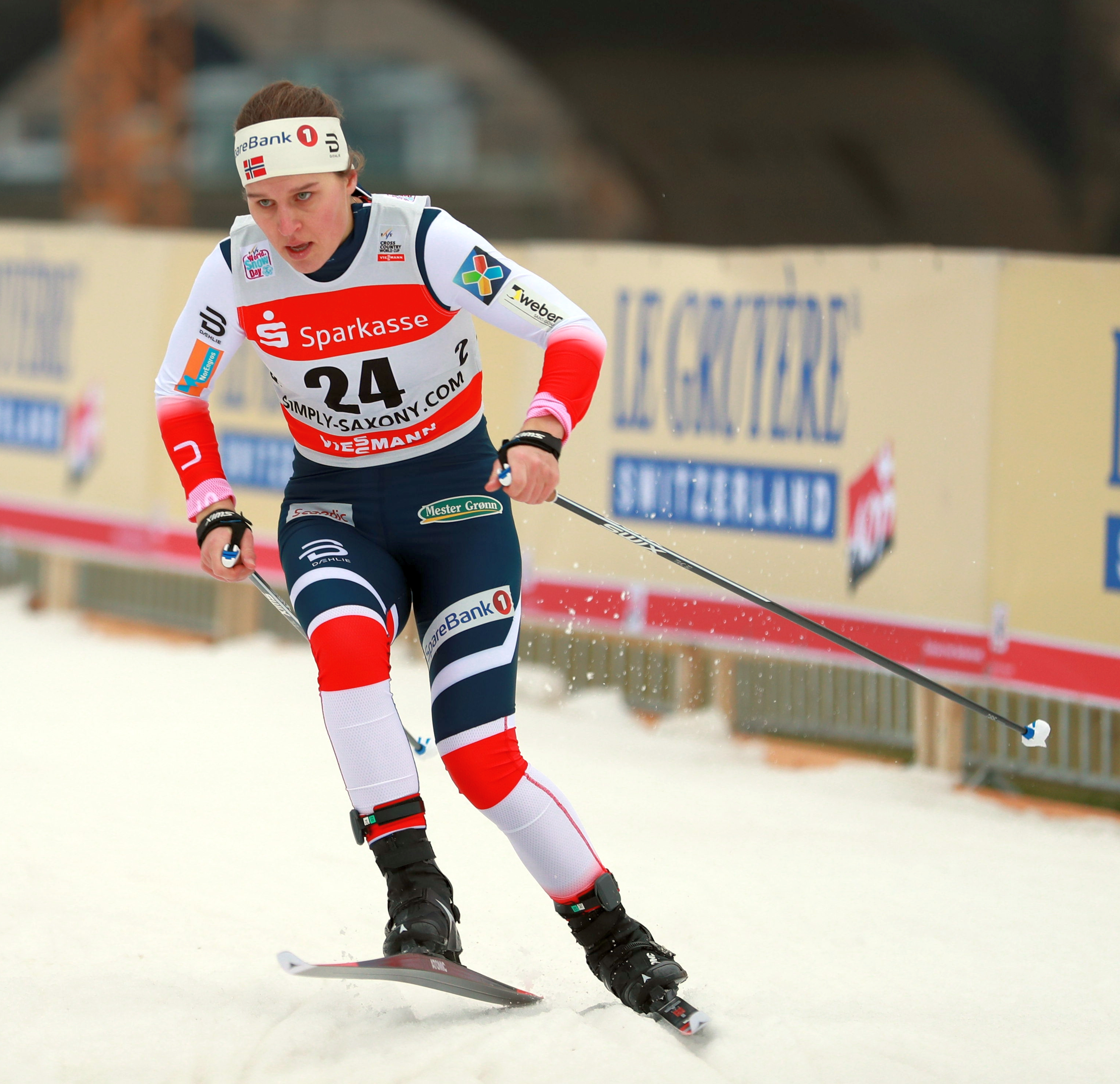
- Udnes Weng in Dresden, January 2018

Personal information
- Nationality: Norway
- Born: 29 September 1996 (age 29)

Sport
- Sport: Skiing
- Club: Nes Ski

World Cup career
- Seasons: 10 – (2015–present)
- Indiv. starts: 139
- Indiv. podiums: 3
- Indiv. wins: 1
- Team starts: 9
- Team podiums: 2
- Team wins: 1
- Overall titles: 0 – (9th in 2023)
- Discipline titles: 0
Medal record
Women's cross-country skiing
Representing Norway
U23 World Championships
Gold medal – first place	2017 Park City	15 km skiathlon
Junior World Championships
Gold medal – first place	2015 Almaty	4 × 3.33 km relay
Silver medal – second place	2014 Val di Fiemme	Individual sprint
Silver medal – second place	2016 Râșnov	Individual sprint
Silver medal – second place	2016 Râșnov	5 km classical
Silver medal – second place	2016 Râșnov	4 × 2.5 km relay
Bronze medal – third place	2014 Val di Fiemme	4 × 3.33 km relay
- Updated on 23 March 2025

Lotta Udnes Weng (born 29 September 1996) is a Norwegian cross-country skier.

== Career ==
At the 2014, 2015 and 2016 Junior World Championships she won four silver medals (one in relay), one bronze and one gold medal (both in relay). As an U23 junior she competed at the 2017 and 2018 Junior World Championships, bagging a gold medal from the 2017 skiathlon.

She made her World Cup debut in March 2015 in Drammen, and collected her first World Cup points in December 2016 in Lillehammer with a 22nd place in the 5 kilometres race. She broke the top 20 for the first time in the 2016–2017 Tour de Ski Oberstdorf skiathlon, and in December–January 2018–19 she broke the top 10 four times. She also made her World Championships debut in 2019, finishing 32nd in the sprint.

Weng represents the sports club Nes Ski. She is the twin sister of Tiril Udnes Weng and a third cousin of Heidi Weng.

== Cross-country skiing results ==
All results are sourced from the International Ski Federation (FIS).

=== Olympic Games ===
Year	Age	10 km individual	15 km skiathlon	30 km mass start	Sprint	4 × 5 km relay	Team sprint
2022	25	25	—	13	22	—	—

=== World Championships ===
Year	Age	10 km individual	15/20 km skiathlon	30/50 km mass start	Sprint	4 × 5/7.5 km relay	Team sprint
2019	22	—	—	—	32	—	—
2021	24	—	—	—	12	—	—
2023	26	—	—	—	18	—	—
2025	28	—	—	—	6	—	7

=== World Cup ===
==== Season standings ====
Season	Age	Discipline standings				Ski Tour standings				
Season	Age	Overall	Distance	Sprint	U23	Nordic Opening	Tour de Ski	Ski Tour 2020	World Cup Final	Ski Tour Canada
2015	18	NC	NC	NC	NC	—	—	—N/a	—N/a	—N/a
2016	19	NC	NC	NC	NC	—	—	—N/a	—N/a	—
2017	20	64	51	50	10	39	DNF	—N/a	—	—N/a
2018	21	68	NC	40	10	—	—	—N/a	—	—N/a
2019	22	35	41	28	5	36	DNF	—N/a	DNF	—N/a
2020	23	34	35	24	—N/a	—	—	14	—N/a	—N/a
2021	24	27	30	27	—N/a	14	—	—N/a	—N/a	—N/a
2022	25	28	23	23	—N/a	—N/a	DNF	—N/a	—N/a	—N/a
2023	26	9	25	9	—N/a	—N/a	8	—N/a	—N/a	—N/a
2024	27	23	19	28	—N/a	—N/a	DNF	—N/a	—N/a	—N/a
2025	28	22	21	14	—N/a	—N/a		—N/a	—N/a	—N/a

==== Individual podiums ====
- 1 victory – (1 SWC)
- 3 podiums – (1 WC, 2 SWC)

No.	Season	Date	Location	Race	Level	Place
1	2022–23	9 December 2022	Beitostølen, Norway	1.3 km Sprint C	World Cup	2nd
2	2022–23	31 December 2022	Val Müstair, Switzerland	1.5 km Sprint F	Stage World Cup	3rd
3	2022–23	6 January 2023	Val di Fiemme, Italy	1.3 km Sprint C	Stage World Cup	1st

==== Team podiums ====
- 1 victory – (1 RL)
- 2 podiums – (1 RL,1 TS)

No.	Season	Date	Location	Race	Level	Place	Teammate(s)
1	2021-22	13 March 2022	Falun, Sweden	12 × 1 km Mixed Team Sprint F	World Cup	3rd	Amundsen
2	2022–23	11 December 2022	Beitostølen, Norway	4 × 5 km Mixed Relay C/F	World Cup	1st	Gunnulfsen / Theodorsen / Krüger
