= Dunbar Ridge =

Coordinates: 79°33′S 84°16′W

Dunbar Ridge is a narrow ridge in Antarctica, 10 nautical miles (18 km) long, which separates the upper reaches of Balish Glacier and Schneider Glacier in the Heritage Range. It was named by the University of Minnesota Geological Party, 1963–64, for Warrant Officer William Dunbar, maintenance officer of the 62nd Transportation Detachment, who aided the party.

== Features ==
Geographical features include:

- Hessler Peak
