= Debora Agreiter =

Italian cross-country skier (born 1991)

Personal information
- Nationality: Italy
- Born: 25 February 1991 (age 35) Brixen, Italy
- Height: 5 ft 5 in (165 cm)

Sport
- Sport: Skiing
- Club: C.S. Carabinieri

World Cup career
- Seasons: 6 – (2011–2016)
- Indiv. starts: 58
- Indiv. podiums: 0
- Team starts: 4
- Overall titles: 0 – (46th in 2013)
- Discipline titles: 0
Medal record
Women's cross-country skiing
Representing Italy
U23 World Championships
Silver medal – second place	2012 Erzurum	15 km skiathlon
Silver medal – second place	2013 Liberec	15 km skiathlon
Bronze medal – third place	2013 Liberec	10 km freestyle
- Updated on 19 January 2019

Debora Agreiter (born 25 February 1991) is an Italian cross-country skier. She competed at the 2014 Winter Olympics in Sochi, in skiathlon and women's classical.

== Cross-country skiing results ==
All results are sourced from the International Ski Federation (FIS).

=== Olympic Games ===
Year	Age	10 km individual	15 km skiathlon	30 km mass start	Sprint	4 × 5 km relay	Team sprint
2014	23	—	29	16	—	—	—

=== World Championships ===
Year	Age	10 km individual	15 km skiathlon	30 km mass start	Sprint	4 × 5 km relay	Team sprint
2013	22	16	31	24	—	8	—

=== World Cup ===
==== Season standings ====
Season	Age	Discipline standings			Ski Tour standings			
Season	Age	Overall	Distance	Sprint	Nordic Opening	Tour de Ski	World Cup Final	Ski Tour Canada
2011	20	NC	NC	NC	—	—	—	—N/a
2012	21	66	53	NC	64	29	—	—N/a
2013	22	46	36	NC	39	22	28	—N/a
2014	23	70	61	NC	—	25	—	—N/a
2015	24	NC	NC	—	—	—	—N/a	—N/a
2016	25	90	67	NC	—	38	—N/a	—
