= 2014 Nordic Junior World Ski Championships =

International skiing competition

FIS Nordic Junior and U23 World Ski Championships 2014
- Host city: Val di Fiemme, Italy
- Events: 21
- Opening: 3 February
- Closing: 8 February
- Main venue: Lago di Tesero Cross Country Stadium

The FIS Nordic Junior and U23 World Ski Championships 2014 took place in Val di Fiemme, Italy from 28 January to 3 February 2014. It was the 37th Junior World Championships and the 9th Under-23 World Championships in Nordic skiing.

== Medal summary ==
=== Junior events ===
==== Cross-country skiing ====
Event	Gold		Silver		Bronze	
Men's Junior Events
Men's junior sprint free	Jean Tiberghien; France		Oskar Svensson; Sweden		Joni Mäki; Finland	
Men's junior 20 km skiathlon	Eirik Sverdrup Augdal; Norway	56:09.6	Aleksey Chervotkin; Russia	56:19.6	Johan Hoel; Norway	56:20.9
Men's junior 10 km classic	Roman Kaygorodov; Russia	26:36.9	Jens Burman; Sweden	26:42.4	Petter Reistad; Norway	26:42.8
Men's junior 4 × 5 km relay	Norway; Eivind Krane Heimdal; Petter Reistad; Johan Hoel; Eirik Sverdrup Augdal	53:36.6	France; Richard Jouve; Valentin Chauvin; Jules Lapierre; Jean Tiberghien	53:37.6	Russia; Alexander Bakanov; Roman Kaygorodov; Evgeniy Vakhrushev; Aleksey Chervotkin	45:11.0
Ladies' Junior Events
Ladies' junior sprint free	Jonna Sundling; Sweden		Lotta Udnes Weng; Norway		Yuliya Belorukova; Russia	
Ladies' junior 10 km skiathlon	Sarah Schaber; Germany	30:45.8	Alisa Zhambalova; Russia	30:47.9	Anna Dyvik; Sweden	30:48.8
Ladies' junior 5 km classic	Natalya Nepryayeva; Russia	14:05.0	Sofia Henriksson; Sweden	14:07.7	Anastasia Sedova; Russia	14:18.6
Ladies' junior 4 × 3.33 km relay	Sweden; Anna Dyvik; Sofia Henriksson; Maja Dahlqvist; Jonna Sundling	39:54.8	Russia; Alisa Zhambalova; Yuliya Belorukova; Anastasia Sedova; Natalya Nepryayeva	40:02.5	Norway; Lovise Heimdal; Ingeranne Strøm Nakstad; Tiril Udnes Weng; Lotta Udnes Weng	40:21.6

==== Nordic Combined ====
Event	Gold		Silver		Bronze	
Normal hill/10 km	Philipp Orter; Austria	29:47.1	Ilkka Herola; Finland	29:51.1	David Welde; Germany	30:20.5
Normal hill/5 km	Philipp Orter; Austria	13:44.2	David Welde; Germany	13:44.3	Martin Fritz; Austria	13:46.0
Team normal hill/4 × 5 km	Austria; Bernhard Flaschberger; Martin Fritz; Fabian Steindl; Philipp Orter	53:57.6	Germany; Dominik Schwaar; Terence Weber; Jakob Lange; David Welde	54:02.1	Norway; Sindre Pettersen; Jarl Magnus Riiber; Sigmund Kielland; Emil Vilhelmsen	55:10.3

==== Ski jumping ====
Event	Gold		Silver		Bronze	
Men's Junior Events
Men's junior individual normal hill	Jakub Wolny; Poland	231.5	Patrick Streitler; Austria	230.7	Evgeniy Klimov; Russia	229.7
Men's junior team normal hill	Poland; Jakub Wolny; Aleksander Zniszczoł; Krzysztof Biegun; Klemens Murańka	1027.0	Austria; Simon Greiderer; Ulrich Wohlegenannt; Elias Tollinger; Patrick Streitler	1022.4	Norway; Daniel-André Tande; Johann André Forfang; Hans Petter Bergquist; Mats Søhagen Berggaard	1011.4
Ladies' Junior Events
Ladies' junior normal hill	Sara Takanashi; Japan	262.9	Coline Mattel; France	248.7	Maren Lundby; Norway	246.2
Ladies' junior team normal hill	Japan; Yuki Ito; Haruka Iwasa; Yurina Yamada; Sara Takanashi	919.0	Slovenia; Urša Bogataj; Barbara Klinec; Anja Javoršek; Špela Rogelj	870.2	France; Léa Lemare; Marie Hoyau; Julia Clair; Coline Mattel	856.9

=== Under-23 events ===
==== Cross-country skiing ====
Event	Gold		Silver		Bronze	
Men's Under-23 Events
Men's under-23 sprint free	Sergey Ustiugov; Russia		Paul Goalabre; France		Roman Schaad; Switzerland	
Men's under-23 15 kilometre classic	Iivo Niskanen; Finland	38:26.6	Sergey Ustiugov; Russia	38:44.0	Mathias Rundgreen; Norway	38:54.3
Men's under-23 30 kilometre skiathlon	Adrien Backscheider; France	1:24:27.9	Damien Tarantola; France	1:24:28.0	Daniel Stock; Norway	1:24:34.3
Ladies' Under-23 Events
Ladies' under-23 sprint free	Elisabeth Schicho; Germany		Jessie Diggins; United States		Giulia Stürz; Italy	
Ladies' under-23 10 kilometre classic	Martine Ek Hagen; Norway	29:18.4	Célia Aymonier; France	29:33.8	Elisabeth Schicho; Germany	29:48.7
Ladies' under-23 15 kilometre skiathlon	Martine Ek Hagen; Norway	44:37.5	Ragnhild Haga; Norway	44:59.9	Teresa Stadlober; Austria	45:19.7

=== Medal table ===
* Host nation (Italy)

Rank	Nation	Gold	Silver	Bronze	Total
1	Norway (NOR)	4	2	8	14
2	Russia (RUS)	3	4	4	11
3	Austria (AUT)	3	2	2	7
4	France (FRA)	2	5	1	8
5	Sweden (SWE)	2	3	1	6
6	Germany (GER)	2	2	2	6
7	Japan (JPN)	2	0	0	2
7	Poland (POL)	2	0	0	2
9	Finland (FIN)	1	1	1	3
10	Slovenia (SLO)	0	1	0	1
10	United States (USA)	0	1	0	1
12	Italy (ITA)*	0	0	1	1
12	Switzerland (SUI)	0	0	1	1
Totals (13 entries)		21	21	21	63
