= Fredrik Riseth =

Norwegian cross-country skier

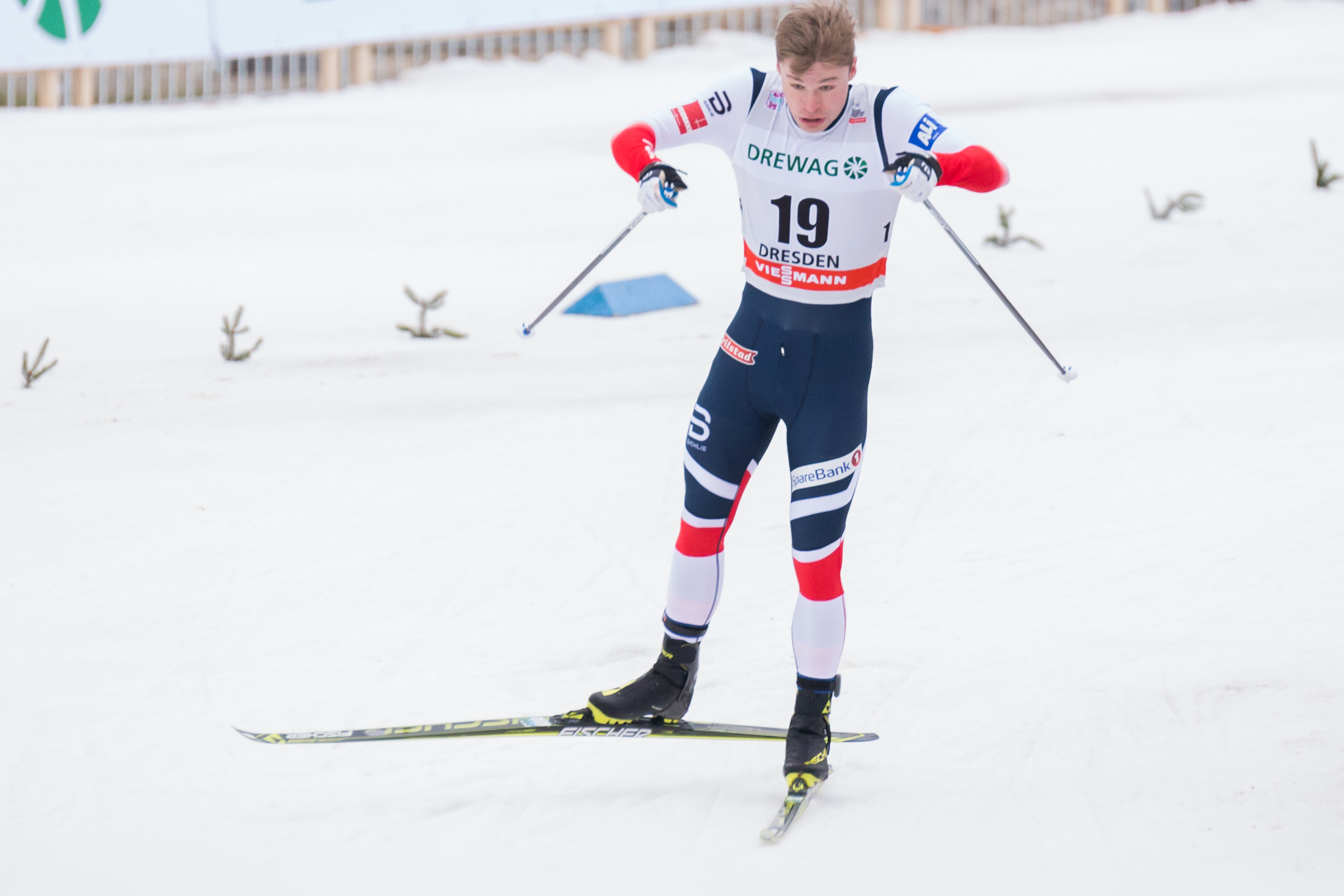

Personal information
- Nationality: Norway
- Born: September 15, 1995 (age 30) Melhus Municipality, Norway

Sport
- Sport: Skiing

World Cup career
- Seasons: 4 – (2015–2016, 2018, 2020)
- Indiv. starts: 7
- Indiv. podiums: 0
- Team starts: 0
- Overall titles: 0 – (62nd in 2018)
- Discipline titles: 0
Medal record
Men's cross-country skiing
Representing Norway
U23 World Championships
Gold medal – first place	2017 Park City	Individual sprint
Junior World Championships
Gold medal – first place	2015 Almaty	Individual sprint

Fredrik Riseth (born 15 September 1995) is a Norwegian former cross-country skier.

His only outing in the 2015 Junior World Championships was the sprint, where he won the gold medal. He won his second gold medal at the 2017 Junior World Championships, this time in the U23 age class.

He made his World Cup debut in the Drammen sprint in March 2015, where he collected his first World Cup points with an 11th place. He repeated this placement in January 2018 in Dresden, and broke the top-ten for the first time in March 2018 in Drammen, where he finished seventh, again in the sprint. After he participated in only one World Cup competition during the 2019–20 season, Riseth retired from international skiing on 1 May 2020.

He represents the sports club Byåsen IL.

== Cross-country skiing results ==
All results are sourced from the International Ski Federation (FIS).

=== World Cup ===
==== Season standings ====
Season	Age	Discipline standings				Ski Tour standings				
Season	Age	Overall	Distance	Sprint	U23	Nordic Opening	Tour de Ski	Ski Tour 2020	World Cup Final	Ski Tour Canada
2015	19	113	—	59	13	—	—	—N/a	—N/a	—N/a
2016	20	132	—	85	15	—	—	—N/a	—N/a	—
2018	22	62	—	27	7	—	—	—N/a	—	—N/a
2020	24	136	—	82	—N/a	—	—	—	—	—N/a
