= Pauline Heßler =

German ski jumper (born 1998)

Pauline Eichhorn
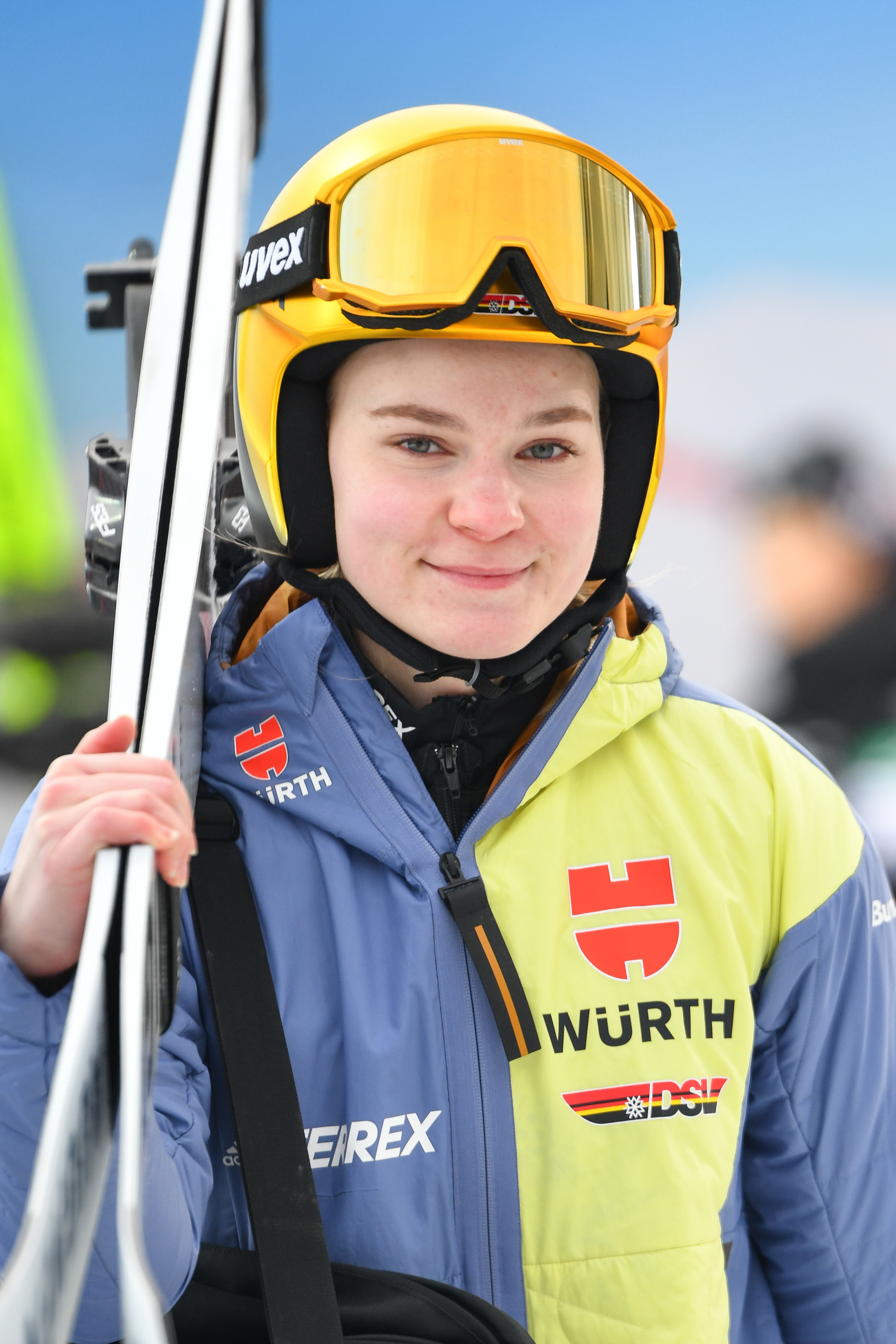
- Heßler in Hinzenbach, 2023

Personal information
- Nationality: Germany
- Born: Pauline Heßler; 13 September 1998 (age 27) Neuhaus am Rennweg, Germany

Sport
- Sport: Skiing
- Club: WSV 08 Lauscha

World Cup career
- Seasons: 2015–2017, 2019, 2021–present
- Indiv. starts: 67
Medal record
Women's ski jumping
Representing Germany
Junior World Championships
Gold medal – first place	2015 Almaty	Team NH
Gold medal – first place	2017 Park City	Team NH
Bronze medal – third place	2013 Liberec	Team NH
- Updated on 1 March 2023

Pauline Eichhorn (née Heßler; born 13 September 1998) is a German ski jumper. She has competed at World Cup level since the 2014/15 season, with her best individual result being 18th place in Pyeongchang on 15 February 2017. At the Junior World Championships, she won team gold medals in 2015 and 2017, and team bronze in 2013.

== Nordic World Ski Championships results ==
Year	Normal hill	Large hill	Team NH	Mixed team
2023	–	26	–	–
