= Sandra Ringwald =

German cross-country skier

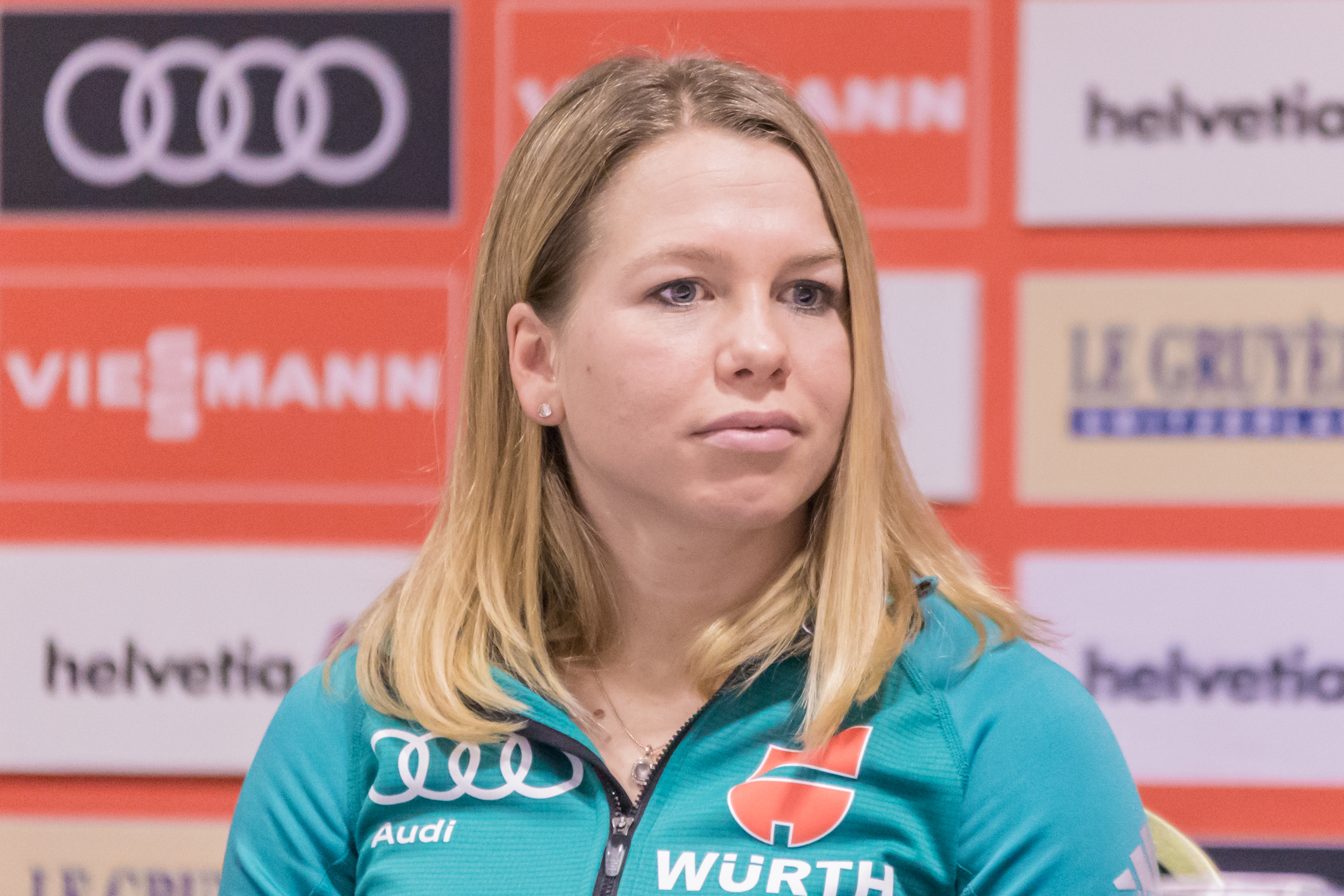
- Sandra Ringwald in January 2018

Personal information
- Nationality: Germany
- Born: 27 September 1990 (age 35) Villingen-Schwenningen, West Germany
- Height: 1.58 m (5 ft 2 in)

Sport
- Sport: Skiing
- Club: ST Schonach-Rohrhardsberg

World Cup career
- Seasons: 9 – (2011–2019)
- Indiv. starts: 148
- Indiv. podiums: 1
- Indiv. wins: 0
- Team starts: 16
- Team podiums: 2
- Team wins: 0
- Overall titles: 0 – (17th in 2016)
- Discipline titles: 0
Medal record
Women's cross-country skiing
Representing Germany
U23 World Championships
Silver medal – second place	2013 Liberec	Individual sprint
- Updated on 2 April 2019

Sandra Ringwald (born 27 September 1990) is a German former cross-country skier. She competed in the World Cup between 2011 and 2019.

She represented Germany at the FIS Nordic World Ski Championships 2015 in Falun.

She announced her retirement from cross-country skiing on 29 March 2019.

== Cross-country skiing results ==
All results are sourced from the International Ski Federation (FIS).

=== Olympic Games ===
Year	Age	10 km individual	15 km skiathlon	30 km mass start	Sprint	4 × 5 km relay	Team sprint
2018	27	26	—	—	16	6	10

=== World Championships ===
Year	Age	10 km individual	15 km skiathlon	30 km mass start	Sprint	4 × 5 km relay	Team sprint
2013	22	—	51	—	38	—	—
2015	24	—	33	—	13	—	—
2017	26	—	21	—	14	6	—
2019	28	27	—	—	12	4	6

=== World Cup ===
==== Season standings ====
Season	Age	Discipline standings			Ski Tour standings			
Season	Age	Overall	Distance	Sprint	Nordic Opening	Tour de Ski	World Cup Final	Ski Tour Canada
2011	21	NC	NC	NC	—	DNF	—	—N/a
2012	22	104	NC	74	—	DNF	—	—N/a
2013	23	71	73	47	—	DNF	—	—N/a
2014	24	48	80	20	53	DNF	26	—N/a
2015	25	59	85	27	54	DNF	—N/a	—N/a
2016	26	17	22	10	24	20	—N/a	16
2017	27	23	31	13	22	DNF	20	—N/a
2018	28	23	35	10	27	DNF	DNF	—N/a
2019	29	20	34	11	18	DNF	21	—N/a

==== Individual podiums ====
- 1 podium – (1 WC)

No.	Season	Date	Location	Race	Level	Place
1	2018–19	16 February 2019	Cogne, Italy	1.6 km Sprint F	World Cup	2nd

==== Team podiums ====
- 2 podiums (1 RL, 1 TS)

No.	Season	Date	Location	Race	Level	Place	Teammate(s)
1	2015–16	17 January 2016	Planica, Slovenia	6 × 1.2 km Team Sprint F	World Cup	3rd	Kolb
2	2016–17	22 January 2017	Ulricehamn, Sweden	4 × 5 km Relay C/F	World Cup	2nd	Hennig / Böhler / Carl
