= Anastasia Kuleshova =

Russian cross-country skier

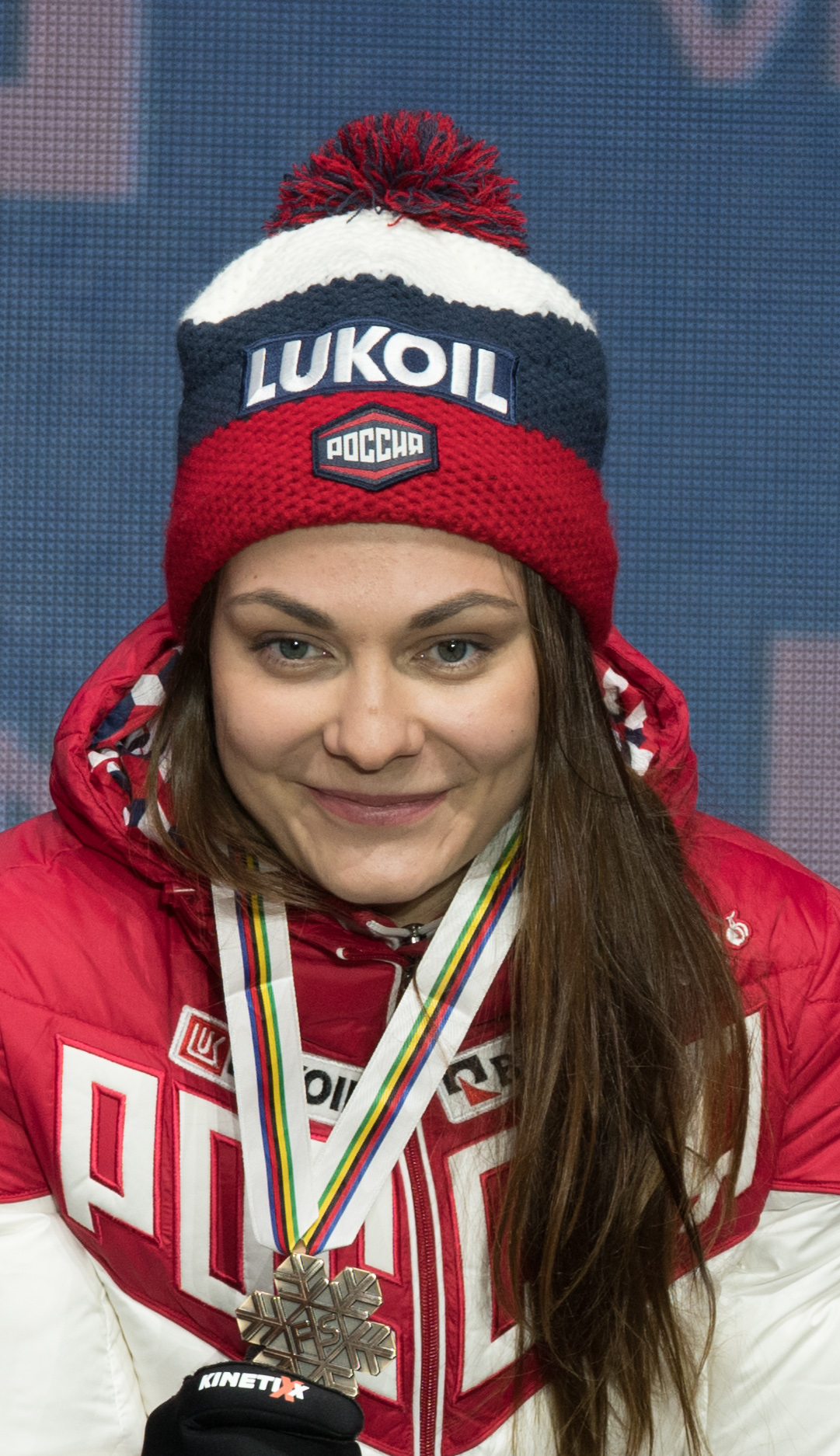

Personal information
- Full name: Anastasia Nikolayevna Kuleshova
- Nationality: Russia
- Born: Anastasia Sedova; 4 February 1995 (age 31) Sarov, Nizhny Novgorod Oblast, Russia
- Height: 1.68 m (5 ft 6 in)

Sport
- Sport: Skiing

World Cup career
- Seasons: 3 – (2017–2019)
- Indiv. starts: 42
- Indiv. podiums: 4
- Indiv. wins: 0
- Team starts: 2
- Team podiums: 0
- Overall titles: 0 – (12th in 2019)
- Discipline titles: 0
Medal record
Women's cross-country skiing
Representing Olympic Athletes from Russia
Olympic Games
| Bronze medal – third place | 2018 Pyeongchang | 4 × 5 km relay |
Representing Russia
World Championships
| Bronze medal – third place | 2019 Seefeld | 4 × 5 km relay |
U23 World Championships
| Gold medal – first place | 2016 Râșnov | 10 km classical |
| Gold medal – first place | 2018 Goms | 15 km skiathlon |
| Bronze medal – third place | 2016 Râșnov | 10 km freestyle |
Junior World Championships
| Silver medal – second place | 2013 Liberec | 4 × 3.33 km relay |
| Silver medal – second place | 2014 Val di Fiemme | 4 × 3.33 km relay |
| Silver medal – second place | 2015 Almaty | 5 km freestyle |
| Silver medal – second place | 2015 Almaty | 4 × 3.33 km relay |
| Bronze medal – third place | 2013 Liberec | 5 km freestyle |
| Bronze medal – third place | 2014 Val di Fiemme | 5 km classical |
Winter Youth Olympics
| Gold medal – first place | 2012 Innsbruck | 5 km classical |
| Silver medal – second place | 2012 Innsbruck | Cross-country; Biathlon mixed relay |
- Updated on 24 March 2019

Anastasia Nikolayevna Kuleshova (Russian: Анастасия Николаевна Кулешова, née Anastasia Sedova; born 4 February 1995) is a Russian cross-country skier who competes internationally with the Russian national team.

She competed at the FIS Nordic World Ski Championships 2017 in Lahti, Finland.

== Cross-country skiing results ==
All results are sourced from the International Ski Federation (FIS).

=== Olympic Games ===
- 1 medal – (1 bronze)

| Year | Age | 10 km individual | 15 km skiathlon | 30 km mass start | Sprint | 4 × 5 km relay | Team sprint |
|---|---|---|---|---|---|---|---|
| 2018 | 23 | 8 | 12 | 11 | — | Bronze | — |

=== World Championships ===
- 1 medal – (1 bronze)

| Year | Age | 10 km individual | 15 km skiathlon | 30 km mass start | Sprint | 4 × 5 km relay | Team sprint |
|---|---|---|---|---|---|---|---|
| 2017 | 22 | 11 | 9 | — | — | 5 | — |
| 2019 | 24 | 6 | 9 | 14 | — | Bronze | — |

=== World Cup ===
==== Season standings ====
| Season | Age | Discipline standings | | | | Ski Tour standings | | |
| Season | Age | Overall | Distance | Sprint | U23 | Nordic Opening | Tour de Ski | World Cup Final |
|---|---|---|---|---|---|---|---|---|
| 2017 | 22 | 40 | 29 | NC | 5 | 25 | — | 26 |
| 2018 | 23 | 16 | 14 | NC | 2 | 18 | 7 | 22 |
| 2019 | 24 | 12 | 9 | 73 | —N/a | — | 4 | 16 |

==== Individual podiums ====
- 4 podiums – (4 SWC)

| No. | Season | Date | Location | Race | Level | Place |
|---|---|---|---|---|---|---|
| 1 | 2018–19 | 30 December 2018 | Toblach, Italy | 10 km Individual F | Stage World Cup | 3rd |
| 2 | 2018–19 | 2 January 2019 | Oberstdorf, Germany | 10 km Mass Start C | Stage World Cup | 3rd |
| 3 | 2018–19 | 5 January 2019 | Val di Fiemme, Italy | 10 km Mass Start C | Stage World Cup | 3rd |
| 4 | 2018–19 | 6 January 2019 | Val di Fiemme, Italy | 9 km Pursuit F | Stage World Cup | 3rd |
