= Hessler Peak =

Mountain in Antarctica

Hessler Peak (79°37′S 84°2′W) is a sharp peak, 1,670 metres (5,480 ft) high, at the south end of Dunbar Ridge in the Heritage Range in Antarctica. It was mapped by the United States Geological Survey from surveys and U.S. Navy air photos from 1961 to 1966, and was named by the Advisory Committee on Antarctic Names for Victor P. Hessler, an ionosphere physicist and United States Antarctic Research Program scientist at the Soviet Vostok Station in the 1965–66 and 1966–67 summer seasons.

== See also ==
- Mountains in Antarctica
