= 2017–18 FIS Cross-Country World Cup =

Cross-country skiing competition

Discipline	Men	Women
Overall	(Norway) Johannes Høsflot Klæbo	(Norway) Heidi Weng (2nd title)
Distance	(Switzerland) Dario Cologna	(Norway) Heidi Weng
Sprint	(Norway) Johannes Høsflot Klæbo	(Norway) Maiken Caspersen Falla
U-23	(Norway) Johannes Høsflot Klæbo	(Russia) Natalya Nepryayeva
Bonus	(Switzerland) Dario Cologna	(United States) Jessie Diggins
Nations Cup	Norway	Norway
- Nations Cup Overall: Norway

Stage events
Nordic Opening	(Norway) Johannes Høsflot Klæbo	(Sweden) Charlotte Kalla
Tour de Ski	(Switzerland) Dario Cologna	(Norway) Heidi Weng
World Cup Final	(Russia) Alexander Bolshunov	(Norway) Marit Bjørgen

Competition
Locations	14 venues	14 venues
Individual	27 events	27 events
Relay/Team	1 event	1 event
Cancelled	1 event	1 event

The 2017–18 FIS Cross-Country World Cup was the 37th official World Cup season in cross-country skiing for men and women. The season began on 24 November 2017 in Ruka, Finland and ended on 18 March 2018 in Falun, Sweden.

== Calendar ==
=== Men ===
C – Classic / F – Freestyle
WC	Stage	Date	Place	Discipline	Winner	Second	Third	Yellow bib	Ref.
	1	24 November 2017	(Finland) Ruka	Sprint C	(Norway) Johannes Høsflot Klæbo	(Norway) Pål Golberg	(Sweden) Calle Halfvarsson	(Norway) Johannes Høsflot Klæbo	
	2	25 November 2017	(Finland) Ruka	15 km C	(Norway) Johannes Høsflot Klæbo	(Norway) Didrik Tønseth	(Finland) Iivo Niskanen	(Norway) Johannes Høsflot Klæbo	
	3	26 November 2017	(Finland) Ruka	15 km F Pursuit	(France) Maurice Manificat	(Finland) Matti Heikkinen	(Norway) Hans Christer Holund	(Norway) Johannes Høsflot Klæbo	
1	8th Nordic Opening Overall (24–26 November 2017)				(Norway) Johannes Høsflot Klæbo	(Norway) Martin Johnsrud Sundby	(Russia) Alexander Bolshunov	(Norway) Johannes Høsflot Klæbo	
2	4	2 December 2017	(Norway) Lillehammer	Sprint C	(Norway) Johannes Høsflot Klæbo	(Russia) Sergey Ustiugov	(Russia) Alexander Bolshunov	(Norway) Johannes Høsflot Klæbo	
3	5	3 December 2017	(Norway) Lillehammer	30 km Skiathlon	(Norway) Johannes Høsflot Klæbo	(Norway) Martin Johnsrud Sundby	(Norway) Hans Christer Holund	(Norway) Johannes Høsflot Klæbo	
4	6	9 December 2017	(Switzerland) Davos	Sprint F	(Norway) Johannes Høsflot Klæbo	(Italy) Federico Pellegrino	(Russia) Alexander Bolshunov	(Norway) Johannes Høsflot Klæbo	
5	7	10 December 2017	(Switzerland) Davos	15 km F	(France) Maurice Manificat	(Russia) Sergey Ustiugov	(Russia) Alexander Bolshunov	(Norway) Johannes Høsflot Klæbo	
6	8	16 December 2017	(Italy) Toblach	15 km F	(Norway) Simen Hegstad Krüger	(France) Maurice Manificat	(United Kingdom) Andrew Musgrave	(Norway) Johannes Høsflot Klæbo	
7	9	17 December 2017	(Italy) Toblach	15 km C Pursuit	(Norway) Johannes Høsflot Klæbo	(Russia) Sergey Ustiugov	(Kazakhstan) Alexey Poltoranin	(Norway) Johannes Høsflot Klæbo	
	10	30 December 2017	(Switzerland) Lenzerheide	Sprint F	(Russia) Sergey Ustiugov	(Italy) Federico Pellegrino	(France) Lucas Chanavat	(Norway) Johannes Høsflot Klæbo	
	11	31 December 2017	(Switzerland) Lenzerheide	15 km C	(Switzerland) Dario Cologna	(Kazakhstan) Alexey Poltoranin	(Norway) Martin Johnsrud Sundby	(Norway) Johannes Høsflot Klæbo	
	12	1 January 2018	(Switzerland) Lenzerheide	15 km F Pursuit	(Switzerland) Dario Cologna	(Russia) Sergey Ustiugov	(Russia) Alexander Bolshunov	(Norway) Johannes Høsflot Klæbo	
		3 January 2018	(Germany) Oberstdorf	Sprint C	cancelled due to severe weather, not rescheduled				
	13	4 January 2018	(Germany) Oberstdorf	15 km F Mass Start	(Norway) Emil Iversen	(Norway) Sindre Bjørnestad Skar	(Italy) Francesco De Fabiani	(Norway) Johannes Høsflot Klæbo	
	14	6 January 2018	(Italy) Val di Fiemme	15 km C Mass Start	(Kazakhstan) Alexey Poltoranin	(Russia) Andrey Larkov	(Canada) Alex Harvey	(Norway) Johannes Høsflot Klæbo	
	15	7 January 2018	(Italy) Val di Fiemme	9 km F Pursuit climb	(Norway) Martin Johnsrud Sundby	(France) Maurice Manificat	(Russia) Denis Spitsov	(Norway) Johannes Høsflot Klæbo	
8	12th Tour de Ski Overall (30 December 2017 – 7 January 2018)				(Switzerland) Dario Cologna	(Norway) Martin Johnsrud Sundby	(Canada) Alex Harvey	(Norway) Martin Johnsrud Sundby	
9	16	13 January 2018	(Germany) Dresden	Sprint F	(Italy) Federico Pellegrino	(Norway) Johannes Høsflot Klæbo	(France) Lucas Chanavat	(Norway) Martin Johnsrud Sundby	
10	17	20 January 2018	(Slovenia) Planica	Sprint C	(Norway) Johannes Høsflot Klæbo	(Norway) Emil Iversen	(Sweden) Teodor Peterson	(Norway) Johannes Høsflot Klæbo	
11	18	21 January 2018	(Slovenia) Planica	15 km C	(Kazakhstan) Alexey Poltoranin	(Norway) Johannes Høsflot Klæbo	(Sweden) Calle Halfvarsson	(Norway) Johannes Høsflot Klæbo	
12	19	27 January 2018	(Austria) Seefeld in Tirol	Sprint F	(Norway) Johannes Høsflot Klæbo	(France) Lucas Chanavat	(Sweden) Calle Halfvarsson	(Norway) Johannes Høsflot Klæbo	
13	20	28 January 2018	(Austria) Seefeld in Tirol	15 km F Mass Start	(Switzerland) Dario Cologna	(Canada) Alex Harvey	(Norway) Martin Johnsrud Sundby	(Norway) Johannes Høsflot Klæbo	
2018 Winter Olympics (9–25 February)
14	21	3 March 2018	(Finland) Lahti	Sprint F	(Italy) Federico Pellegrino	(Russia) Gleb Retivykh	(Norway) Johannes Høsflot Klæbo	(Norway) Johannes Høsflot Klæbo	
15	22	4 March 2018	(Finland) Lahti (Note: Alexey Poltoranin was disqualified two years later, because of illegal doping. This result was deleted)	15 km C	(Russia) Alexander Bolshunov	(Finland) Iivo Niskanen	(Norway) Emil Iversen	(Norway) Johannes Høsflot Klæbo	
16	23	7 March 2018	(Norway) Drammen	Sprint C	(Norway) Johannes Høsflot Klæbo	(Norway) Eirik Brandsdal	(Russia) Alexander Bolshunov	(Norway) Johannes Høsflot Klæbo	
17	24	10 March 2018	(Norway) Oslo	50 km F Mass Start	(Switzerland) Dario Cologna	(Norway) Martin Johnsrud Sundby	(Russia) Maxim Vylegzhanin	(Norway) Johannes Høsflot Klæbo	
	25	16 March 2018	(Sweden) Falun	Sprint F	(Norway) Johannes Høsflot Klæbo	(Italy) Federico Pellegrino	(France) Lucas Chanavat	(Norway) Johannes Høsflot Klæbo	
	26	17 March 2018	(Sweden) Falun	15 km C Mass Start	(Russia) Alexander Bolshunov	(Sweden) Calle Halfvarsson	(Italy) Francesco De Fabiani	(Norway) Johannes Høsflot Klæbo	
	27	18 March 2018	(Sweden) Falun	15 km F Pursuit	(Canada) Alex Harvey	(Norway) Hans Christer Holund	(Russia) Maxim Vylegzhanin	(Norway) Johannes Høsflot Klæbo	
18	2017/18 World Cup Final (16–18 March 2018)				(Russia) Alexander Bolshunov	(Canada) Alex Harvey	(Switzerland) Dario Cologna	(Norway) Johannes Høsflot Klæbo	

=== Women ===
WC	Stage	Date	Place	Discipline	Winner	Second	Third	Yellow bib	Ref.
	1	24 November 2017	(Finland) Ruka	Sprint C	(Sweden) Stina Nilsson	(United States) Sadie Bjornsen	(Russia) Yuliya Belorukova	(Sweden) Stina Nilsson	
	2	25 November 2017	(Finland) Ruka	10 km C	(Norway) Marit Bjørgen	(Sweden) Charlotte Kalla	(Norway) Ingvild Flugstad Østberg	(Sweden) Stina Nilsson	
	3	26 November 2017	(Finland) Ruka	10 km F Pursuit	(Norway) Ragnhild Haga	(Norway) Heidi Weng	(Sweden) Charlotte Kalla	(Sweden) Charlotte Kalla	
1	8th Nordic Opening Overall (24–26 November 2017)				(Sweden) Charlotte Kalla	(Norway) Marit Bjørgen	(Norway) Ragnhild Haga	(Sweden) Charlotte Kalla	
2	4	2 December 2017	(Norway) Lillehammer	Sprint C	(Norway) Maiken Caspersen Falla	(Finland) Krista Pärmäkoski	(United States) Sadie Bjornsen	(Sweden) Charlotte Kalla	
3	5	3 December 2017	(Norway) Lillehammer	15 km Skiathlon	(Sweden) Charlotte Kalla	(Norway) Heidi Weng	(Norway) Ragnhild Haga	(Sweden) Charlotte Kalla	
4	6	9 December 2017	(Switzerland) Davos	Sprint F	(Sweden) Stina Nilsson	(Norway) Maiken Caspersen Falla	(United States) Kikkan Randall	(Sweden) Charlotte Kalla	
5	7	10 December 2017	(Switzerland) Davos	10 km F	(Norway) Ingvild Flugstad Østberg	(Norway) Ragnhild Haga	(Finland) Krista Pärmäkoski	(Sweden) Charlotte Kalla	
6	8	16 December 2017	(Italy) Toblach	10 km F	(Sweden) Charlotte Kalla	(Norway) Ragnhild Haga	(Norway) Heidi Weng	(Sweden) Charlotte Kalla	
7	9	17 December 2017	(Italy) Toblach	10 km C Pursuit	(Norway) Marit Bjørgen	(Norway) Ingvild Flugstad Østberg	(Norway) Heidi Weng	(Sweden) Charlotte Kalla	
	10	30 December 2017	(Switzerland) Lenzerheide	Sprint F	(Switzerland) Laurien van der Graaff	(United States) Sophie Caldwell	(Norway) Maiken Caspersen Falla	(Sweden) Charlotte Kalla	
	11	31 December 2017	(Switzerland) Lenzerheide	10 km C	(Norway) Ingvild Flugstad Østberg	(Norway) Heidi Weng	(United States) Sadie Bjornsen	(Sweden) Charlotte Kalla	
	12	1 January 2018	(Switzerland) Lenzerheide	10 km F Pursuit	(Norway) Ingvild Flugstad Østberg	(Norway) Heidi Weng	(United States) Jessie Diggins	(Norway) Ingvild Flugstad Østberg	
		(Note: Qualification was completed, but the race was cancelled before the final rounds. Sprint qualification times will not count towards the Tour de Ski but will count for FIS points.) 3 January 2018	(Germany) Oberstdorf	Sprint C	cancelled after qualification due to severe weather, not rescheduled				
	13	4 January 2018	(Germany) Oberstdorf	10 km F Mass Start	(Norway) Ingvild Flugstad Østberg	(Norway) Maiken Caspersen Falla	(Finland) Krista Pärmäkoski	(Norway) Ingvild Flugstad Østberg	
	14	6 January 2018	(Italy) Val di Fiemme	10 km C Mass Start	(Norway) Heidi Weng	(Finland) Krista Pärmäkoski	(Austria) Teresa Stadlober	(Norway) Ingvild Flugstad Østberg	
	15	7 January 2018	(Italy) Val di Fiemme	9 km F Pursuit climb	(Norway) Heidi Weng	(Austria) Teresa Stadlober	(United States) Jessie Diggins	(Norway) Ingvild Flugstad Østberg	
8	12th Tour de Ski Overall (30 December 2017 – 7 January 2018)				(Norway) Heidi Weng	(Norway) Ingvild Flugstad Østberg	(United States) Jessie Diggins	(Norway) Heidi Weng	
9	16	13 January 2018	(Germany) Dresden	Sprint F	(Sweden) Hanna Falk	(Sweden) Maja Dahlqvist	(United States) Sophie Caldwell	(Norway) Heidi Weng	
10	17	20 January 2018	(Slovenia) Planica	Sprint C	(Sweden) Stina Nilsson	(Norway) Kathrine Harsem	(Norway) Maiken Caspersen Falla	(Norway) Heidi Weng	
11	18	21 January 2018	(Slovenia) Planica	10 km C	(Finland) Krista Pärmäkoski	(Sweden) Charlotte Kalla	(Norway) Heidi Weng	(Norway) Heidi Weng	
12	19	27 January 2018	(Austria) Seefeld in Tirol	Sprint F	(United States) Sophie Caldwell (Switzerland) Laurien van der Graaff	Not awarded	(Norway) Maiken Caspersen Falla	(Norway) Heidi Weng	
13	20	28 January 2018	(Austria) Seefeld in Tirol	10 km F Mass Start	(United States) Jessie Diggins	(Norway) Heidi Weng	(Norway) Ragnhild Haga	(Norway) Heidi Weng	
2018 Winter Olympics (9–25 February)
14	21	3 March 2018	(Finland) Lahti	Sprint F	(Norway) Maiken Caspersen Falla	(Sweden) Stina Nilsson	(Sweden) Hanna Falk	(Norway) Heidi Weng	
15	22	4 March 2018	(Finland) Lahti	10 km C	(Finland) Krista Pärmäkoski	(Russia) Natalya Nepryayeva	(Norway) Marit Bjørgen	(Norway) Heidi Weng	
16	23	7 March 2018	(Norway) Drammen	Sprint C	(Norway) Maiken Caspersen Falla	(Sweden) Stina Nilsson	(United States) Jessie Diggins	(Norway) Heidi Weng	
17	24	11 March 2018	(Norway) Oslo	30 km F Mass Start	(Norway) Marit Bjørgen	(United States) Jessie Diggins	(Norway) Ragnhild Haga	(Norway) Heidi Weng	
	25	16 March 2018	(Sweden) Falun	Sprint F	(Sweden) Hanna Falk	(Sweden) Jonna Sundling	(Norway) Marit Bjørgen	(Norway) Heidi Weng	
	26	17 March 2018	(Sweden) Falun	10 km C Mass Start	(Finland) Krista Pärmäkoski	(Norway) Marit Bjørgen	(Norway) Ingvild Flugstad Østberg	(Norway) Heidi Weng	
	27	18 March 2018	(Sweden) Falun	10 km F Pursuit	(United States) Jessie Diggins	(Norway) Ragnhild Haga	(Norway) Marit Bjørgen	(Norway) Heidi Weng	
18	2017/18 World Cup Final (16–18 March 2018)				(Norway) Marit Bjørgen	(United States) Jessie Diggins	(United States) Sadie Bjornsen	(Norway) Heidi Weng	

=== Men's team ===
WC	Date	Place	Discipline	Winner	Second	Third	Ref.
1	14 January 2018	(Germany) Dresden	Team Sprint F	Italy I Dietmar Nöckler; Federico Pellegrino	Sweden I Emil Jönsson; Teodor Peterson	Russia I Andrey Krasnov; Gleb Retivykh	

=== Women's team ===
WC	Date	Place	Discipline	Winner	Second	Third	Ref.
1	14 January 2018	(Germany) Dresden	Team Sprint F	Sweden II Ida Ingemarsdotter; Maja Dahlqvist	Sweden I Hanna Falk; Stina Nilsson	United States I Ida Sargent; Sophie Caldwell	

== Men's standings ==
=== Overall ===
Rank	after all 30 events	Points
	(Norway) Johannes Høsflot Klæbo	1409
2	(Switzerland) Dario Cologna	1290
3	(Norway) Martin Johnsrud Sundby	1261
4	(Canada) Alex Harvey	1179
5	(Russia) Alexander Bolshunov	1152
6	(Norway) Hans Christer Holund	917
7	(Kazakhstan) Alexey Poltoranin	796
8	(France) Maurice Manificat	763
9	(Norway) Emil Iversen	635
10	(Italy) Federico Pellegrino	613

=== Distance ===
Rank	after all 17 events	Points
	(Switzerland) Dario Cologna	698
2	(Norway) Martin Johnsrud Sundby	657
3	(Norway) Hans Christer Holund	599
4	(Canada) Alex Harvey	594
5	(France) Maurice Manificat	586
6	(Kazakhstan) Alexey Poltoranin	533
7	(Norway) Johannes Høsflot Klæbo	457
8	(Norway) Simen Hegstad Krüger	413
9	(Russia) Alexander Bolshunov	396
10	(Russia) Sergey Ustiugov	388

=== Sprint ===
Rank	after all 10 events	Points
	(Norway) Johannes Høsflot Klæbo	740
2	(Italy) Federico Pellegrino	497
3	(France) Lucas Chanavat	323
4	(Norway) Emil Iversen	310
5	(Finland) Ristomatti Hakola	293
6	(Russia) Alexander Bolshunov	276
7	(Russia) Gleb Retivykh	245
8	(France) Richard Jouve	206
9	(Norway) Eirik Brandsdal	194
10	(Sweden) Calle Halfvarsson	187

=== Prize money ===
Rank	after all 39 payouts	CHF
1	(Norway) Johannes Høsflot Klæbo	168.449
2	(Switzerland) Dario Cologna	116.075
3	(Norway) Martin Johnsrud Sundby	100.075
4	(Russia) Alexander Bolshunov	85.825
5	(Canada) Alex Harvey	82.400
6	(Kazakhstan) Alexey Poltoranin	51.350
7	(Italy) Federico Pellegrino	43.900
8	(Norway) Hans Christer Holund	42.325
9	(France) Maurice Manificat	38.470
10	(Russia) Sergey Ustiugov	35.500

=== Helvetia U23 ===
Rank	after all 30 events	Points
	(Norway) Johannes Høsflot Klæbo	1409
2	(Russia) Alexander Bolshunov	1152
3	(Russia) Aleksey Chervotkin	569
4	(Russia) Denis Spitsov	376
5	(Sweden) Oskar Svensson	229
6	(Norway) Even Northug	97
7	(Norway) Fredrik Riseth	74
8	(Russia) Ivan Yakimushkin	71
9	(Finland) Lauri Vuorinen	67
10	(Norway) Mattis Stenshagen	65

=== Audi Quattro Bonus Ranking ===
Rank	after all 11 events	Points
	(Switzerland) Dario Cologna	184
2	(Russia) Alexander Bolshunov	137
3	(Norway) Martin Johnsrud Sundby	122
4	(Norway) Johannes Høsflot Klæbo	121
5	(Russia) Sergey Ustiugov	116
6	(Canada) Alex Harvey	116
7	(Italy) Federico Pellegrino	103
8	(Norway) Hans Christer Holund	102
9	(France) Maurice Manificat	101
10	(Finland) Ristomatti Hakola	92

== Women's standings ==
=== Overall ===
Rank	after all 30 events	Points
	(Norway) Heidi Weng	1476
2	(United States) Jessie Diggins	1436
3	(Norway) Ingvild Flugstad Østberg	1414
4	(Finland) Krista Pärmäkoski	1220
5	(Norway) Marit Bjørgen	1078
6	(United States) Sadie Bjornsen	956
7	(Sweden) Charlotte Kalla	934
8	(Austria) Teresa Stadlober	888
9	(Norway) Ragnhild Haga	808
10	(Finland) Kerttu Niskanen	757

=== Distance ===
Rank	after all 17 events	Points
	(Norway) Heidi Weng	818
2	(Norway) Ingvild Flugstad Østberg	755
3	(United States) Jessie Diggins	723
4	(Finland) Krista Pärmäkoski	656
5	(Norway) Marit Bjørgen	636
6	(Sweden) Charlotte Kalla	620
7	(Austria) Teresa Stadlober	592
8	(Norway) Ragnhild Haga	588
9	(Finland) Kerttu Niskanen	481
10	(United States) Sadie Bjornsen	422

=== Sprint ===
Rank	after all 10 events	Points
	(Norway) Maiken Caspersen Falla	573
2	(Sweden) Stina Nilsson	495
3	(United States) Sophie Caldwell	396
4	(Sweden) Hanna Falk	331
5	(Switzerland) Laurien van der Graaff	295
6	(United States) Jessie Diggins	269
7	(Finland) Krista Pärmäkoski	252
8	(United States) Sadie Bjornsen	246
9	(Norway) Kathrine Rolsted Harsem	208
10	(Germany) Sandra Ringwald	207

=== Prize money ===
Rank	after all 39 payouts	CHF
1	(Norway) Heidi Weng	140.100
2	(Norway) Ingvild Flugstad Østberg	111.775
3	(United States) Jessie Diggins	109.075
4	(Norway) Marit Bjørgen	94.175
5	(Finland) Krista Pärmäkoski	79.900
6	(Sweden) Charlotte Kalla	65.600
7	(Norway) Ragnhild Haga	61.000
8	(Sweden) Stina Nilsson	53.300
9	(Norway) Maiken Caspersen Falla	51.250
10	(United States) Sadie Bjornsen	41.075

=== Helvetia U23 ===
Rank	after all 30 events	Points
	(Russia) Natalya Nepryayeva	614
2	(Russia) Anastasia Sedova	474
3	(Sweden) Ebba Andersson	263
4	(Switzerland) Nadine Fähndrich	245
5	(Russia) Yuliya Belorukova	222
6	(Slovenia) Anamarija Lampič	216
7	(Norway) Tiril Udnes Weng	199
8	(Germany) Victoria Carl	175
9	(Germany) Katharina Hennig	167
10	(Norway) Lotta Udnes Weng	50

=== Audi Quattro Bonus Ranking ===
Rank	after all 11 events	Points
	(United States) Jessie Diggins	181
2	(Finland) Krista Pärmäkoski	154
3	(Norway) Heidi Weng	145
4	(Norway) Ingvild Flugstad Østberg	133
5	(United States) Sophie Caldwell	90
6	(Sweden) Charlotte Kalla	83
7	(Norway) Marit Bjørgen	80
8	(Norway) Maiken Caspersen Falla	74
9	(United States) Sadie Bjornsen	66
10	(Switzerland) Laurien van der Graaff	64

== Nations Cup ==
=== Overall ===
Rank	after all 62 events	Points
1	Norway	10821
2	Sweden	5383
3	Russia	5328
4	Finland	3772
5	United States	3702
6	Switzerland	2914
7	France	2214
8	Germany	1899
9	Italy	1698
10	Canada	1299

=== Men ===
Rank	after all 31 events	Points
1	Norway	5306
2	Russia	3639
3	France	2055
4	Switzerland	1853
5	Sweden	1812
6	Italy	1338
7	Finland	1292
8	Canada	1284
9	Kazakhstan	808
10	Germany	574

=== Women ===
Rank	after all 31 events	Points
1	Norway	5515
2	Sweden	3571
3	United States	3270
4	Finland	2480
5	Russia	1689
6	Germany	1325
7	Switzerland	1061
8	Austria	906
9	Slovenia	525
10	Italy	360

== Points distribution ==
The table shows the number of points won in the 2017/18 Cross-Country Skiing World Cup for men and ladies.

Place	1	2	3	4	5	6	7	8	9	10	11	12	13	14	15	16	17	18	19	20	21	22	23	24	25	26	27	28	29	30
Individual	100	80	60	50	45	40	36	32	29	26	24	22	20	18	16	15	14	13	12	11	10	9	8	7	6	5	4	3	2	1
Team Sprint	100	80	60	50	45	40	36	32	29	26	24	22	20	18	16	15	14	13	12	11	10	9	8	7	6	5	4	3	2	1
Nordic Opening	200	160	120	100	90	80	72	64	58	52	48	44	40	36	32	30	28	26	24	22	20	18	16	14	12	10	8	6	4	2
World Cup Final	200	160	120	100	90	80	72	64	58	52	48	44	40	36	32	30	28	26	24	22	20	18	16	14	12	10	8	6	4	2
Relay	200	160	120	100	90	80	72	64	58	52	48	44	40	36	32	30	28	26	24	22	20	18	16	14	12	10	8	6	4	2
Tour de Ski	400	320	240	200	180	160	144	128	116	104	96	88	80	72	64	60	56	52	48	44	40	36	32	28	24	20	16	12	8	4
Stage Nordic Opening	50	46	43	40	37	34	32	30	28	26	24	22	20	18	16	15	14	13	12	11	10	9	8	7	6	5	4	3	2	1
Stage Tour de Ski	50	46	43	40	37	34	32	30	28	26	24	22	20	18	16	15	14	13	12	11	10	9	8	7	6	5	4	3	2	1
Stage World Cup Final	50	46	43	40	37	34	32	30	28	26	24	22	20	18	16	15	14	13	12	11	10	9	8	7	6	5	4	3	2	1
Bonus points	15	12	10	8	6	5	4	3	2	1

== Achievements ==
Only individual events.

First World Cup career victory

Men

- (Norway) Simen Hegstad Krüger, 24, in his 6th season - the WC 6 (15 km F) in Toblach; first podium was 2016–17 WC 7 (10 km F) in Toblach
- (Russia) Alexander Bolshunov, 21, in his 2nd season - the WC 15 (15 km C) in Lahti; first podium was 2017–18 WC 1 (8th Nordic Opening overall) in Ruka

Women

- (Norway) Ragnhild Haga, 26, in her 9th season – the WC 1 (15 km F Pursuit) in Ruka; first podium was 2014–15 WC 8 (3 km F Prologue) in Oberstdorf
- (Switzerland) Laurien van der Graaff, 30, in her 9th season – the WC 8 (Sprint F) in Lenzerheide; first podium was 2011–12 WC 3 (Sprint F) in Düsseldorf

First World Cup podium

Men

- (Russia) Alexander Bolshunov, 20, in his 2nd season – no. 3 in the WC 1 (8th Nordic Opening overall) in Ruka
- (France) Lucas Chanavat, 23, in his 3rd season – no. 3 in the WC 8 (Sprint F) in Lenzerheide
- (Russia) Andrey Larkov, 28, in his 6th season – no. 2 in the WC 8 (15 km C Mass Start) in Val di Fiemme
- (Russia) Denis Spitsov, 21, in his 1st season – no. 3 in the WC 8 (9 km F Pursuit Climb) in Val di Fiemme

Women

- (Russia) Yuliya Belorukova, 22, in her 4th season – no. 3 in the WC 1 (Sprint C) in Ruka
- (Austria) Teresa Stadlober, 24, in her 5th season – no. 3 in the WC 8 (10 km C Mass Start) in Val di Fiemme
- (Sweden) Maja Dahlqvist, 23, in her 4th season – no. 2 in the WC 9 (Sprint F) in Dresden
- (Norway) Kathrine Harsem, 28, in her 9th season – no. 2 in the WC 10 (Sprint C) in Planica
- (Russia) Natalya Nepryayeva, 22, in her 5th season – no. 2 in the WC 15 (10 km C) in Lahti
- (Sweden) Jonna Sundling, 23, in her 4th season – no. 2 in the WC 18 (Sprint F) in Falun

Victories in this World Cup (all-time number of victories in parentheses)

Men

- (Norway) Johannes Høsflot Klæbo, 11 (14) first places
- (Switzerland) Dario Cologna, 5 (26) first places
- (Russia) Alexander Bolshunov, 3 (3) first places
- (Kazakhstan) Alexey Poltoranin, 2 (11) first places
- (Italy) Federico Pellegrino, 2 (11) first places
- (France) Maurice Manificat, 2 (9) first places
- (Norway) Martin Johnsrud Sundby, 1 (30) first place
- (Russia) Sergey Ustiugov, 1 (12) first place
- (Canada) Alex Harvey, 1 (7) first place
- (Norway) Emil Iversen, 1 (5) first place
- (Norway) Simen Hegstad Krüger, 1 (1) first place

Women

- (Norway) Marit Bjørgen, 4 (114) first places
- (Norway) Ingvild Flugstad Østberg, 4 (11) first places
- (Norway) Maiken Caspersen Falla, 3 (16) first places
- (Sweden) Stina Nilsson, 3 (15) first places
- (Sweden) Charlotte Kalla, 3 (12) first places
- (Norway) Heidi Weng, 3 (11) first places
- (Finland) Krista Pärmäkoski, 3 (5) first places
- (United States) Jessie Diggins, 2 (5) first places
- (Sweden) Hanna Falk, 2 (4) first places
- (Switzerland) Laurien van der Graaff, 2 (2) first places
- (United States) Sophie Caldwell, 1 (2) first place
- (Norway) Ragnhild Haga, 1 (1) first place

== Retirements ==
Following are notable cross-country skiers who announced their retirement during or after this season:

Men

- Gianluca Cologna (SUI)
- Sergei Dolidovich (BLR)
- Hannes Dotzler (GER)
- Robin Duvillard (FRA)
- Ola Vigen Hattestad (NOR)
- Marcus Hellner (SWE)
- Noah Hoffman (USA)
- Martin Jakš (CZE)
- Emil Jönsson (SWE)
- Devon Kershaw (CAN)
- Graeme Killick (CAN)
- Dušan Kožíšek (CZE)
- Alexander Legkov (RUS)
- Martin Møller (DEN)
- Ville Nousiainen (FIN)
- Aleš Razým (CZE)
- Aivar Rehemaa (EST)
- Matias Strandvall (FIN)
- Tim Tscharnke (GER)

Women

- Marit Bjørgen (NOR)
- Martyna Galewicz (POL)
- Anna Haag (SWE)
- Martine Ek Hagen (NOR)
- Sylwia Jaśkowiec (POL)
- Aurore Jean (FRA)
- Justyna Kowalczyk (POL)
- Ewelina Marcisz (POL)
- Mona-Liisa Nousiainen (FIN)
- Kikkan Randall (USA)
- Aino-Kaisa Saarinen (FIN)
- Elizabeth Stephen (USA)
- Heidi Widmer (SUI)
