= Aleksey Chervotkin =

Russian cross-country skier (born 1995)

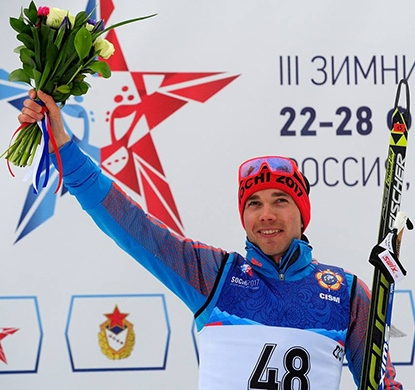
- Chervotkin in 2017

Personal information
- Full name: Aleksey Aleksandrovich Chervotkin
- Nationality: Russia
- Born: 30 April 1995 (age 31) Zykovy, Kirov Oblast, Russia
- Height: 1.74 m (5 ft 9 in)

Sport
- Sport: Skiing

World Cup career
- Seasons: 8 – (2015–2022)
- Indiv. starts: 67
- Indiv. podiums: 4
- Indiv. wins: 0
- Team starts: 6
- Team podiums: 2
- Team wins: 0
- Overall titles: 0 – (11th in 2018)
- Discipline titles: 0
Medal record
Men's cross-country skiing
International nordic ski competitions
Event	1st	2nd	3rd
Olympic Games	1	1	0
World Championships	0	2	0
Total	1	3	0
Representing ROC
Olympic Games
Gold medal – first place	2022 Beijing	4 × 10 km relay
Representing Olympic Athletes from Russia
Olympic Games
Silver medal – second place	2018 Pyeongchang	4 × 10 km relay
Representing Russian Ski Federation
World Championships
Silver medal – second place	2021 Oberstdorf	4 × 10 km relay
Representing Russia
World Championships
Silver medal – second place	2017 Lahti	4 × 10 km relay
U23 World Championships
Silver medal – second place	2016 Râșnov	15 km classical
Silver medal – second place	2017 Park City	15 km freestyle
Silver medal – second place	2017 Park City	30 km skiathlon
Junior World Championships
Gold medal – first place	2013 Liberec	4 × 5 km relay
Gold medal – first place	2015 Almaty	10 km freestyle
Gold medal – first place	2015 Almaty	20 km skiathlon
Gold medal – first place	2015 Almaty	4 × 5 km relay
Silver medal – second place	2014 Val di Fiemme	20 km skiathlon
Bronze medal – third place	2013 Liberec	20 km skiathlon
Bronze medal – third place	2014 Val di Fiemme	4 × 5 km relay
Military World Games
Gold medal – first place	2017 Sochi	15 km freestyle
Silver medal – second place	2017 Sochi	15 km freestyle team
- Updated on 23 March 2022

Aleksey Aleksandrovich Chervotkin (Russian: Алексей Александрович Червоткин; born 30 April 1995) is a Russian cross-country skier who competes internationally with the Russian national team.

He competed at the FIS Nordic World Ski Championships 2017 in Lahti, Finland, in men's 4 × 10 km relay and won the silver medal.

== Cross-country skiing results ==
All results are sourced from the International Ski Federation (FIS).

=== Olympic Games ===
- 2 medals – (1 gold, 1 silver)

Year	Age	15 km individual	30 km skiathlon	50 km mass start	Sprint	4 × 10 km relay	Team sprint
2018	22	—	—	12	—	Silver	—
2022	26	5	36	—^{[a]}	—	Gold	—

^{a} Distance reduced to 30 km due to weather conditions.

=== World Championships ===
- 2 medals – (2 silver)

Year	Age	15 km individual	30 km skiathlon	50 km mass start	Sprint	4 × 10 km relay	Team sprint
2017	21	—	—	13	—	Silver	—
2021	25	—	18	14	—	Silver	—

=== World Cup ===
==== Season standings ====
Season	Age	Discipline standings				Ski Tour standings				
Season	Age	Overall	Distance	Sprint	U23	Nordic Opening	Tour de Ski	Ski Tour 2020	World Cup Final	Ski Tour Canada
2015	19	132	81	—	19	—	—	—N/a	—N/a	—N/a
2016	20	87	49	—	9	—	—	—N/a	—N/a	—
2017	21	86	55	NC	6	—	—	—N/a		—N/a
2018	22	11	11	NC	3rd place, bronze medalist(s)	5	9	—N/a	23	—N/a
2019	23	38	24	NC	—N/a	20	—	—N/a	—	—N/a
2020	24	50	32	NC	—N/a	—	—	—	—N/a	—N/a
2021	25	13	13	66	—N/a	7	17	—N/a	—N/a	—N/a
2022 (Note: On 1 March 2022, following the 2022 Russian invasion of Ukraine, FIS decided not to allow athletes from Russian and Belarus to take part in FIS competitions, with an immediate effect.)	26	15	7	NC	—N/a	—N/a	13	—N/a	—N/a	—N/a

==== Individual podiums ====
- 4 podiums – (1 WC, 3 SWC)

No.	Season	Date	Location	Race	Level	Place
1	2020–21	28 November 2020	Rukatunturi, Finland	15 km Individual C	Stage World Cup	2nd
2	2020–21	8 January 2021	Val di Fiemme, Italy	15 km Mass Start C	Stage World Cup	3rd
3	2021–22	27 November 2021	Rukatunturi, Finland	15 km Individual C	World Cup	2nd
4	2021–22	3 January 2022	Val di Fiemme, Italy	15 km Mass Start C	Stage World Cup	3rd

==== Team podiums ====
- 2 podiums – (2 RL)

No.	Season	Date	Location	Race	Level	Place	Teammates
1	2015–16	24 January 2016	Nové Město, Czech Republic	4 × 7.5 km Relay C/F	World Cup	2nd	Belov / Legkov / Ustiugov
2	2016–17	18 December 2016	La Clusaz, France	4 × 7.5 km Relay C/F	World Cup	2nd	Belov / Legkov / Ustiugov

== Personal life ==
Chervotkin is an alumnus of the Penza State University's Faculty of Physical Education.
