= 2021–22 Tour de Ski =

16th edition of skiing event in Europe

Tour de Ski
2021–22 FIS Cross-Country World Cup

Ski tour details
- Venue(s): Lenzerheide, Switzerland; Oberstdorf, Germany; Val di Fiemme, Italy
- Dates: 28 December 2021 – 4 January 2022
- Stages: 6

Results
Men
Jersey awarded to the men's overall winner	Winner	Johannes Høsflot Klæbo (NOR)
	Second	Alexander Bolshunov (RUS)
	Third	Iivo Niskanen (FIN)
Jersey awarded to the men's points classification winner	Points	Johannes Høsflot Klæbo (NOR)
Women
Jersey awarded to the women's overall winner	Winner	Natalya Nepryayeva (RUS)
	Second	Ebba Andersson (SWE)
	Third	Heidi Weng (NOR)
Jersey awarded to the women's points classification winner	Points	Johanna Hagström (SWE)

The 2021–22 Tour de Ski was the 16th edition of the Tour de Ski and part of the 2021–22 FIS Cross-Country World Cup. The World Cup stage event began in Lenzerheide, Switzerland on 28 December 2021 and concluded with the Final Climb stage in Val di Fiemme, Italy, on 4 January 2022. The tour was the fourth edition starting in Lenzerheide. Alexander Bolshunov from Russia and Jessie Diggins from United States were the title defenders.

Bolshunov wasn't able to win, as Johannes Høsflot Klæbo from Norway took the yellow bib on first stage and extended the lead over Russian to over two minutes. This is second overall victory for Klæbo. Natalya Nepryayeva won the women competition after her two overall second places in the past and became the first Russian female to win Tour de Ski.

== Schedule ==
Stage	Venue	Date	Event	Technique	Distance		Start time (CET)	
Stage	Venue	Date	Event	Technique	Women	Men	Women	Men
1	Lenzerheide (SUI)	28 December 2021	Sprint	Free	1.5 km	1.5 km	14:00	14:00
2	Lenzerheide (SUI)	29 December 2021	Distance, interval start	Classic	10 km	15 km	13:30	15:05
3	Oberstdorf (GER)	31 December 2021	Distance, mass start	Free	10 km	15 km	15:25	12:55
4	Oberstdorf (GER)	1 January 2022	Sprint	Classic	1.2 km	1.5 km	12:00	12:00
5	Val di Fiemme (ITA)	3 January 2022	Distance, mass start	Classic	10 km	15 km	12:40	14:50
6	Val di Fiemme (ITA)	4 January 2022	Final Climb, mass start	Free	10 km	10 km	11:30	15:25

== Overall leadership ==
Two main individual classifications are contested in the 2021–22 Tour de Ski, as well as a team competition. The most important is the overall standings, calculated by adding each skier's finishing times on each stage. Time bonuses (time subtracted) are awarded at both sprint stages and at intermediate points during mass start stage 5. In the sprint stages, the winners are awarded 60 bonus seconds, while on mass start stage 5, the first ten skiers past the intermediate point receive from 15 seconds to 1 seconds. The skier with the lowest cumulative time is the overall winner of the Tour de Ski. For the third time in Tour history, the skier leading the overall standings wears a yellow bib.

Bonus seconds for the top 30 positions by type
Type		1	2	3	4	5	6	7	8	9	10	11	12	13–15	16–20	21–25	26–30
In finish	Interval start	none															
In finish	Mass start	none															
In finish	Sprint	60	54	48	46	44	42	32	30	28	26	24	22	10	8	6	4
Intermediate sprint	Mass Start (only stage 5)	15	12	10	8	6	5	4	3	2	1	none					

The second competition is the points standings, which replaced the sprint competition from past editions. The skiers who receive the highest number of points during the Tour win the points standings. The points available for each stage finish are determined by the stage's type. The leader is identified by a red bib.

Points standings points for the top 10 positions by type
Type		1	2	3	4	5	6	7	8	9	10
In finish
In finish	Sprint	30	24	20	16	12	10	8	6	4	2
Intermediate sprint	Interval start (1st IT)	15	12	10	8	6	5	4	3	2	1
Intermediate sprint	Mass start	15	12	10	8	6	5	4	3	2	1

The final competition is a team competition. This is calculated using the finishing times of the best two skiers of both genders per team on each stage; the leading team is the team with the lowest cumulative time.

Classification leadership by stage
Stage	Men			Women		
Stage	Winner	Overall standings	Points standings	Winner	Overall standings	Points standings
1	Johannes Høsflot Klæbo	Johannes Høsflot Klæbo	Johannes Høsflot Klæbo	Jessie Diggins	Jessie Diggins	Jessie Diggins
2	Iivo Niskanen	Johannes Høsflot Klæbo	Johannes Høsflot Klæbo	Kerttu Niskanen	Kerttu Niskanen	Jessie Diggins
3	Johannes Høsflot Klæbo	Johannes Høsflot Klæbo	Johannes Høsflot Klæbo	Jessie Diggins	Jessie Diggins	Jessie Diggins
4	Johannes Høsflot Klæbo	Johannes Høsflot Klæbo	Johannes Høsflot Klæbo	Natalya Nepryayeva	Natalya Nepryayeva	Natalya Nepryayeva
5	Johannes Høsflot Klæbo	Johannes Høsflot Klæbo	Johannes Høsflot Klæbo	Natalya Nepryayeva	Natalya Nepryayeva	Natalya Nepryayeva
6	Sjur Røthe	Johannes Høsflot Klæbo	Johannes Høsflot Klæbo	Heidi Weng	Natalya Nepryayeva	Johanna Hagström
Final		Johannes Høsflot Klæbo	Johannes Høsflot Klæbo	Final	Natalya Nepryayeva	Johanna Hagström

== Final standings ==
Legend
Denotes the winner of the Overall standings	Denotes the winner of the Points standings

=== Overall standings ===
==== Men ====
Final overall standings (1–10)
Rank	Name	Time
1	Johannes Høsflot Klæbo (NOR)	2:24:56.0
2	Alexander Bolshunov (RUS)	+2:03.2
3	Iivo Niskanen (FIN)	+3:14.5
4	Denis Spitsov (RUS)	+3:21.5
5	Pål Golberg (NOR)	+4:08.3
6	Ivan Yakimushkin (RUS)	+4:28.0
7	Didrik Tønseth (NOR)	+4:42.2
8	Erik Valnes (NOR)	+4:58.4
9	Harald Østberg Amundsen (NOR)	+5:13.4
10	Calle Halfvarsson (SWE)	+5:33.0

Final overall standings (11–56)
Rank	Name	Time
11	Sjur Røthe (NOR)	+5:34.1
12	Martin Løwstrøm Nyenget (NOR)	+5:49.4
13	Aleksey Chervotkin (RUS)	+6:06.6
14	Friedrich Moch (GER)	+6:20.0
15	Hugo Lapalus (FRA)	+6:20.6
16	Artem Maltsev (RUS)	+6:22.2
17	Ilia Semikov (RUS)	+6:36.9
18	Jonas Baumann (SUI)	+6:49.8
19	Janosch Brugger (GER)	+7:09.8
20	Lucas Bögl (GER)	+7:21.1
21	Perttu Hyvärinen (FIN)	+7:30.0
22	Clément Parisse (FRA)	+7:35.5
23	Andrey Melnichenko (RUS)	+7:42.2
24	Naoto Baba (JPN)	+7:53.7
25	Francesco De Fabiani (ITA)	+8:06.6
26	Irineu Esteve Altimiras (AND)	+8:10.1
27	Federico Pellegrino (ITA)	+8:10.6
28	Michal Novák (CZE)	+8:13.3
29	Andrew Musgrave (GBR)	+9:02.6
30	Giandomenico Salvadori (ITA)	+9:24.1
31	Dominik Bury (POL)	+9:52.9
32	Maicol Rastelli (ITA)	+10:14.8
33	Roman Furger (SUI)	+10:18.2
34	Oskar Svensson (SWE)	+10:22.8
35	Adam Fellner (CZE)	+10:33.1
36	Remi Lindholm (FIN)	+10:36.1
37	Albert Kuchler (GER)	+10:37.6
38	Paolo Ventura (ITA)	+10:50.3
39	Candide Pralong (SUI)	+11:14.0
40	Martin Collet (FRA)	+11:17.4
41	Gleb Retivykh (RUS)	+11:52.4
42	Imanol Rojo (ESP)	+11:54.7
43	Thomas Maloney Westgård (IRL)	+12:11.8
44	Cyril Fähndrich (SUI)	+12:26.3
45	Vitaliy Pukhkalo (KAZ)	+12:45.6
46	Martin Coradazzi (ITA)	+13:09.3
47	Viktor Brännmark (SWE)	+13:28.0
48	Eric Rosjö (SWE)	+13:30.6
49	Gustav Eriksson (SWE)	+14:02.4
50	Petr Knop (CZE)	+14:49.9
51	Yevgeniy Velichko (KAZ)	+14:53.9
52	Masato Tanaka (JPN)	+14:59.8
53	Even Northug (NOR)	+15:38.5
54	Zak Ketterson (USA)	+16:06.4
55	Gustaf Berglund (SWE)	+17:08.2
56	Ville Ahonen (FIN)	+17:08.6

==== Women ====
Final overall standings (1–10)
Rank	Name	Time
1	Natalya Nepryayeva (RUS)	1:59:38.5
2	Ebba Andersson (SWE)	+46.7
3	Heidi Weng (NOR)	+1:07.7
4	Krista Pärmäkoski (FIN)	+1:48.6
5	Kerttu Niskanen (FIN)	+1:52.0
6	Tatiana Sorina (RUS)	+2:24.7
7	Teresa Stadlober (AUT)	+2:35.5
8	Jessie Diggins (USA)	+3:15.8
9	Katharina Hennig (GER)	+3:21.3
10	Tiril Udnes Weng (NOR)	+3:38.6

Final overall standings (11–46)
Rank	Name	Time
11	Delphine Claudel (FRA)	+4:49.2
12	Anamarija Lampič (SLO)	+5:07.4
13	Anne Kjersti Kalvå (NOR)	+5:08.4
14	Johanna Matintalo (FIN)	+5:09.8
15	Anne Kyllönen (FIN)	+5:11.2
16	Charlotte Kalla (SWE)	+5:30.6
17	Ragnhild Haga (NOR)	+6:11.8
18	Nadine Fähndrich (SUI)	+6:14.6
19	Katherine Sauerbrey (GER)	+6:15.0
20	Caterina Ganz (ITA)	+6:51.1
21	Masako Ishida (JPN)	+7:12.4
22	Silje Theodorsen (NOR)	+7:20.9
23	Sophia Laukli (USA)	+7:39.6
24	Novie McCabe (USA)	+7:46.1
25	Anastasia Rygalina (RUS)	+7:46.8
26	Sofie Krehl (GER)	+8:01.2
27	Kateřina Janatová (CZE)	+8:09.7
28	Ekaterina Smirnova (RUS)	+8:22.8
29	Coralie Bentz (FRA)	+8:28.5
30	Pia Fink (GER)	+8:37.6
31	Lisa Lohmann (GER)	+9:02.8
32	Antonia Fräbel (GER)	+9:04.8
33	Liliya Vasilyeva (RUS)	+9:17.8
34	Flora Dolci (FRA)	+9:33.1
35	Louise Lindström (SWE)	+10:03.1
36	Lucia Scardoni (ITA)	+10:46.0
37	Lydia Hiernickel (SUI)	+11:16.7
38	Anna Svendsen (NOR)	+11:45.3
39	Cristina Pittin (ITA)	+12:16.8
40	Hristina Matsokina (RUS)	+12:27.0
41	Carola Vila Obiols (AND)	+13:30.5
42	Jessica Yeaton (AUS)	+13:43.5
43	Johanna Hagström (SWE)	+14:38.0
44	Alayna Sonnesyn (USA)	+14:54.8
45	Shiori Yokohama (JPN)	+16:26.7
46	Kseniya Shalygina (KAZ)	+16:59.4

=== Points standings ===
==== Men ====
Final points standings (1–10)
Rank	Name	Points
1	Johannes Høsflot Klæbo (NOR)	111
2	Erik Valnes (NOR)	80
3	Alexander Bolshunov (RUS)	64
4	Pål Golberg (NOR)	56
5	Iivo Niskanen (FIN)	35
6	Calle Halfvarsson (SWE)	30
7	Martin Løwstrøm Nyenget (NOR)	24
8	Even Northug (NOR)	20
9	Federico Pellegrino (ITA)	18
10	Sjur Røthe (NOR)	16

==== Women ====
Final points standings (1–10)
Rank	Name	Points
1	Johanna Hagström (SWE)	60
2	Jessie Diggins (USA)	59
3	Natalia Nepryaeva (RUS)	55
4	Ebba Andersson (SWE)	53
5	Heidi Weng (NOR)	51
6	Anamarija Lampič (SLO)	36
7	Krista Pärmäkoski (FIN)	33
8	Johanna Matintalo (FIN)	23
9	Tatiana Sorina (RUS)	21
10	Kerttu Niskanen (FIN)	20

=== Team standings ===
Final Team standings (1–5)
Rank	Nation	Time
1	Norway	8:52:22.4
2	Russia	+2:35.0
3	Finland	+9:53.7
4	Sweden	+13:15.7
5	Germany	+15:25.0

== Stages ==
=== Stage 1 ===
28 December 2021, Lenzerheide, Switzerland

- Bonus seconds to the 30 skiers that qualifies for the quarter-finals, distributed as following:
  - Final: 60–54–48–46–44–42
  - Semi-final: 32–30–28–26–24–22
  - Quarter-final: 10–10–10–8–8–8–8–8–6–6–6–6–6–4–4–4–4–4

Men – 1.5 km Sprint Free
Rank	Name	QT	Time	BS
1	Johannes Høsflot Klæbo (NOR)	2:36.66 (1)	2:39.04	60
2	Richard Jouve (FRA)	2:39.11 (2)	+0.99	54
3	Lucas Chanavat (FRA)	2:39.49 (3)	+1.26	48
4	Erik Valnes (NOR)	2:44.08 (13)	+1.49	46
5	Federico Pellegrino (ITA)	2:43.15 (8)	+1.81	44
6	Pål Golberg (NOR)	2:42.94 (7)	+2.01	42
7	Alexander Terentyev (RUS)	2:44.29 (15)	SF	32
8	Roman Furger (SUI)	2:44.36 (16)	SF	30
9	Even Northug (NOR)	2:41.80 (4)	SF	28
10	Valerio Grond (SUI)	2:43.65 (12)	SF	26

Women – 1.5 km Sprint Free
Rank	Name	QT	Time	BS
1	Jessie Diggins (USA)	3:03.04 (3)	3:00.12	60
2	Mathilde Myhrvold (NOR)	3:02.69 (2)	+0.13	54
3	Anamarija Lampič (SLO)	3:05.26 (10)	+0.30	48
4	Julia Kern (USA)	3:05.24 (9)	+0.59	46
5	Anna Dyvik (SWE)	3:03.42 (4)	+3.92	44
6	Coletta Rydzek (GER)	3:09.01 (25)	+5.40	42
7	Tiril Udnes Weng (NOR)	3:05.26 (11)	SF	32
8	Johanna Hagström (SWE)	3:03.96 (5)	SF	30
9	Laura Gimmler (GER)	3:06.83 (15)	SF	28
10	Kerttu Niskanen (FIN)	3:07.17 (17)	SF	26

=== Stage 2 ===
29 December 2021, Lenzerheide, Switzerland

- No bonus seconds are awarded on this stage.

Men – 15 km Individual Classic
Rank	Name	Time
1	Iivo Niskanen (FIN)	34:51.7
2	Alexander Bolshunov (RUS)	+19.3
3	Pål Golberg (NOR)	+25.2
4	Johannes Høsflot Klæbo (NOR)	+34.3
5	Ivan Yakimushkin (RUS)	+34.6
6	Francesco De Fabiani (ITA)	+54.1
7	Denis Spitsov (RUS)	+55.7
8	Erik Valnes (NOR)	+59.6
9	Martin Løwstrøm Nyenget (NOR)	+1:14.0
10	Didrik Tønseth (NOR)	+1:16.1

Women – 10 km Individual Classic
Rank	Name	Time
1	Kerttu Niskanen (FIN)	27:04.0
2	Ebba Andersson (SWE)	+18.2
3	Natalya Nepryayeva (RUS)	+30.5
4	Krista Pärmäkoski (FIN)	+34.0
5	Frida Karlsson (SWE)	+44.6
6	Teresa Stadlober (AUT)	+45.8
7	Yuliya Stupak (RUS)	+48.1
8	Tatiana Sorina (RUS)	+48.3
9	Johanna Matintalo (FIN)	+55.0
10	Anne Kjersti Kalvå (NOR)	+55.7

=== Stage 3 ===
31 December 2021, Oberstdorf, Germany

- No bonus seconds are awarded on this stage.

Men – 15 km Mass Start Free
Rank	Name	Time
1	Johannes Høsflot Klæbo (NOR)	32:26.4
2	Alexander Bolshunov (RUS)	+3.4
3	Sjur Røthe (NOR)	+4.0
4	Andrew Musgrave (GBR)	+5.6
5	Francesco De Fabiani (ITA)	+23.6
6	Calle Halfvarsson (SWE)	+23.6
7	Clément Parisse (FRA)	+25.1
8	Hugo Lapalus (FRA)	+27.8
9	Pål Golberg (NOR)	+30.8
10	Ivan Yakimushkin (RUS)	+35.2

Women – 10 km Mass Start Free
Rank	Name	Time
1	Jessie Diggins (USA)	21:30.8
2	Frida Karlsson (SWE)	+0.5
3	Tatiana Sorina (RUS)	+0.8
4	Ebba Andersson (SWE)	+1.2
5	Heidi Weng (NOR)	+2.6
6	Katharina Hennig (GER)	+3.5
7	Teresa Stadlober (AUT)	+4.6
8	Natalya Nepryayeva (RUS)	+8.0
9	Delphine Claudel (FRA)	+12.1
10	Anne Kjersti Kalvå (NOR)	+18.5

=== Stage 4 ===
1 January 2022, Oberstdorf, Germany

- Bonus seconds to the 30 skiers that qualifies for the quarter-finals, distributed as following:
  - Final: 60–54–48–46–44–42
  - Semi-final: 32–30–28–26–24–22
  - Quarter-final: 10–10–10–8–8–8–8–8–6–6–6–6–6–4–4–4–4–4

Men – 1.5 km Sprint Classic
Rank	Name	QT	Time	BS
1	Johannes Høsflot Klæbo (NOR)	2:55.78 (1)	2:54.77	60
2	Erik Valnes (NOR)	2:58.15 (3)	+0.37	54
3	Pål Golberg (NOR)	3:01.85 (7)	+3.35	48
4	Even Northug (NOR)	3:02.14 (8)	+3.39	46
5	Calle Halfvarsson (SWE)	3:03.07 (10)	+3.90	44
6	Francesco De Fabiani (ITA)	3:03.15 (11)	+11.71	42
7	Alexander Bolshunov (RUS)	2:59.39 (5)	SF	32
8	Jovian Hediger (SUI)	3:06.43 (21)	SF	30
9	Harald Østberg Amundsen (NOR)	3:01.38 (6)	SF	28
10	Michal Novák (CZE)	3:02.69 (9)	SF	26

Women – 1.2 km Sprint Classic
Rank	Name	QT	Time	BS
1	Natalya Nepryayeva (RUS)	2:42.05 (14)	2:36.41	60
2	Johanna Hagström (SWE)	2:37.46 (2)	+0.32	54
3	Johanna Matintalo (FIN)	2:36.97 (1)	+0.86	48
4	Anamarija Lampič (SLO)	2:38.24 (3)	+1.29	46
5	Mathilde Myhrvold (NOR)	2:41.81 (13)	+4.22	44
6	Tatiana Sorina (RUS)	2:41.38 (11)	+7.53	42
7	Greta Laurent (ITA)	2:39.87 (5)	SF	32
8	Nadine Fähndrich (SUI)	2:43.11 (21)	SF	30
9	Ane Appelkvist Stenseth (NOR)	2:38.58 (4)	SF	28
10	Kerttu Niskanen (FIN)	2:43.07 (19)	SF	26

=== Stage 5 ===
3 January 2022, Val di Fiemme, Italy

Men – 15 km Mass Start Classic
Rank	Name	Time	BS
1	Johannes Høsflot Klæbo (NOR)	41:31.2	15
2	Iivo Niskanen (FIN)	+20.8	12
3	Aleksey Chervotkin (RUS)	+23.7	3
4	Denis Spitsov (RUS)	+24.0	8
5	Alexander Bolshunov (RUS)	+27.9	2
6	Didrik Tønseth (NOR)	+40.1	10
7	Erik Valnes (NOR)	+50.0	4
8	Hugo Lapalus (FRA)	+54.1	1
9	Ivan Yakimushkin (RUS)	+56.2	
10	Harald Østberg Amundsen (NOR)	+56.5	5

Women – 10 km Mass Start Classic
Rank	Name	Time	BS
1	Natalya Nepryayeva (RUS)	29:51.3	6
2	Heidi Weng (NOR)	+3.7	12
3	Krista Pärmäkoski (FIN)	+4.8	10
4	Ebba Andersson (SWE)	+7.5	15
5	Katharina Hennig (GER)	+10.9	8
6	Teresa Stadlober (AUT)	+14.3	5
7	Kerttu Niskanen (FIN)	+43.5	4
8	Tiril Udnes Weng (NOR)	+51.2	2
9	Johanna Matintalo (FIN)	+51.3	
10	Tatiana Sorina (RUS)	+53.1	3

==== Stage 5 bonus seconds ====
- Men: 1 intermediate sprint, bonus seconds to the 10 first skiers (15–12–10–8–6–5–4–3–2–1) past the intermediate point.
- Women: 1 intermediate sprint, bonus seconds to the 10 first skiers (15–12–10–8–6–5–4–3–2–1) past the intermediate point.
- No bonus seconds are awarded at the finish

Bonus seconds (Stage 5 – Men)
Name	Point 1
Johannes Høsflot Klæbo (NOR)	15
Iivo Niskanen (FIN)	12
Didrik Tønseth (NOR)	10
Denis Spitsov (RUS)	8
Martin Løwstrøm Nyenget (NOR)	6
Harald Østberg Amundsen (NOR)	5
Erik Valnes (NOR)	4
Aleksey Chervotkin (RUS)	3
Alexander Bolshunov (RUS)	2
Hugo Lapalus (FRA)	1

Bonus seconds (Stage 5 – Women)
Name	Point 1
Ebba Andersson (SWE)	15
Heidi Weng (NOR)	12
Krista Pärmäkoski (FIN)	10
Katharina Hennig (GER)	8
Natalya Nepryayeva (RUS)	6
Teresa Stadlober (AUT)	5
Kerttu Niskanen (FIN)	4
Tatiana Sorina (RUS)	3
Tiril Udnes Weng (NOR)	2
Anne Kyllönen (FIN)	1

=== Stage 6 ===
4 January 2022, Val di Fiemme, Italy

The race for "Fastest of the Day" counts for 2021–22 FIS Cross-Country World Cup points. No bonus seconds are awarded on this stage.

Men – 10 km Final Climb Mass Start Free
Rank	Name	Time
1	Sjur Røthe (NOR)	31:42.1
2	Denis Spitsov (RUS)	+2.4
3	Friedrich Moch (GER)	+18.9
4	Lucas Bögl (GER)	+30.0
5	Johannes Høsflot Klæbo (NOR)	+34.9
6	Irineu Esteve Altimiras (AND)	+37.0
7	Alexander Bolshunov (RUS)	+38.1
8	Naoto Baba (JPN)	+39.6
9	Didrik Tønseth (NOR)	+41.1
10	Artem Maltsev (RUS)	+51.1

Women – 10 km Final Climb Mass Start Free
Rank	Name	Time
1	Heidi Weng (NOR)	35:41.2
2	Ebba Andersson (SWE)	+7.0
3	Delphine Claudel (FRA)	+28.5
4	Natalya Nepryayeva (RUS)	+32.3
5	Sophia Laukli (USA)	+49.9
6	Krista Pärmäkoski (FIN)	+59.9
7	Novie McCabe (USA)	+1:04.4
8	Kerttu Niskanen (FIN)	+1:05.3
9	Teresa Stadlober (AUT)	+1:08.8
10	Tatiana Sorina (RUS)	+1:15.0

== World Cup points distribution ==
The table shows the number of 2021–22 FIS Cross-Country World Cup points to win in the 2021–22 Tour de Ski for men and women.

Place	1	2	3	4	5	6	7	8	9	10	11	12	13	14	15	16	17	18	19	20	21	22	23	24	25	26	27	28	29	30	31 - 40	>40
Overall Standings	400	320	240	200	180	160	144	128	116	104	96	88	80	72	64	60	56	52	48	44	40	36	32	28	24	20	20	20	20	20	10	5
Each Stage	50	46	43	40	37	34	32	30	28	26	24	22	20	18	16	15	14	13	12	11	10	9	8	7	6	5	4	3	2	1

== Sources ==
- Rules for the FIS Cross-Country World Cup (PDF). International Ski Federation (FIS). 2021. Archived from the original (PDF) on 21 June 2021.
- FIS CROSS-COUNTRY WORLD CUP 2021/22 (PDF). International Ski Federation (FIS). 2021. Archived from the original (PDF) on 11 March 2022.
