= Veronika Stepanova =

Russian cross-country skier

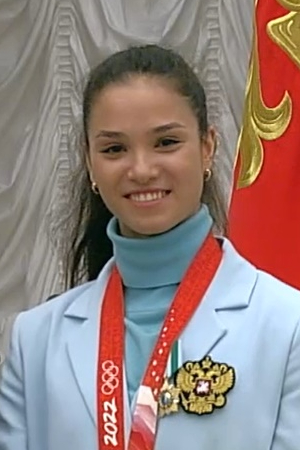
- Stepanova at the Kremlin in 2022

Personal information
- Nationality: Russia
- Born: 4 January 2001 (age 25) Yelizovo, Kamchatka Oblast, Russia

Sport
- Sport: Skiing

World Cup career
- Seasons: 2 – (2021–2022)
- Indiv. starts: 6
- Indiv. podiums: 0
- Team starts: 1
- Team podiums: 1
- Team wins: 1
- Overall titles: 0 – (60th in 2022)
- Discipline titles: 0
Medal record
Women's cross-country skiing
Representing ROC
Olympic Games
Gold medal – first place	2022 Beijing	4 × 5 km relay
Representing Russia
U23 World Championships
Bronze medal – third place	2022 Lygna	10 km classical
Bronze medal – third place	2022 Lygna	4 × 5 km mixed relay
Junior World Championships
Gold medal – first place	2021 Vuokatti	5 km freestyle
Silver medal – second place	2019 Lahti	4 × 3.3 km relay
Silver medal – second place	2021 Vuokatti	4 × 3.3 km relay
- Updated on 12 March 2022

Veronika Sergeyevna Stepanova (Russian: Вероника Сергеевна Степанова; born 4 January 2001) is a Russian cross-country skier who competes internationally with the Russian national team.

== Career ==
Stepanova competed at three Junior World Championships from 2019 to 2021, winning individual gold in the 5 km freestyle technique in 2021, and two silver medals with the relay team in 2019 and 2021. She represented Russian Olympic Committee athletes at the 2022 Winter Olympics in the individual sprint and won a gold medal in the women's 4 × 5 kilometre relay.

== Personal life ==
During the meeting with Russian president Vladimir Putin on 26 April 2022, commemorating Russian medal winners at the 2022 Winter Olympics and in the wake of the Russian invasion of Ukraine, Stepanova said: "In my eyes, Russia is back strong, proud and successful again. Not everyone in the world likes her; it’s obvious. But we are on the right track, and we will definitely win, just as we won the Olympics."

== Cross-country skiing results ==
All results are sourced from the International Ski Federation (FIS).

=== Olympic Games ===
- 1 medal – (1 gold)

Year	Age	10 km individual	15 km skiathlon	30 km mass start	Sprint	4 × 5 km relay	Team sprint
2022	21	—	—	—	7	Gold	—

=== World Cup ===
==== Season standings ====
Season	Age	Discipline standings				Ski Tour standings	
Season	Age	Overall	Distance	Sprint	U23	Nordic Opening	Tour de Ski
2021	20	117	86	—	30	—	—
2022 (Note: On 1 March 2022, following the Russian invasion of Ukraine, the FIS decided not to allow athletes from Russia and Belarus to take part in FIS competitions, with immediate effect.)	21	60	31	NC	7	—N/a	—

==== Team podiums ====
- 1 victory – (1 RL, 1 TS)
- 1 podium – (1 RL)

No.	Season	Date	Location	Race	Level	Place	Teammates
1	2021–22	5 December 2021	Lillehammer, Norway	4 × 5 km Relay C/F	World Cup	1st	Stupak / Nepryayeva / Sorina
