= Darya Rublova =

Ukrainian cross-country skier (born 2000)

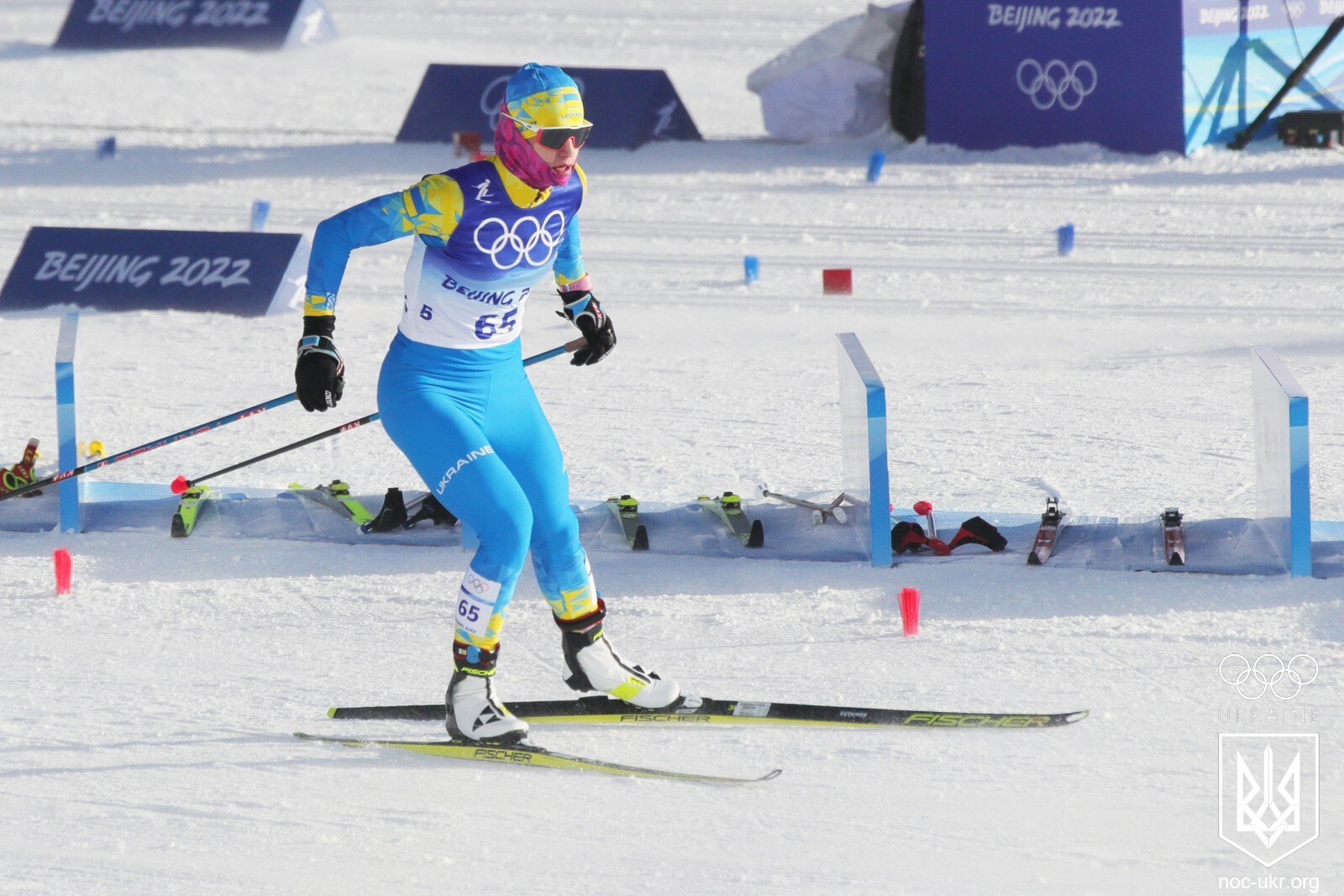
- Rublova at the 2022 Winter Olympics

Personal information
- Full name: Darya Andriyivna Rublova
- Nationality: Ukraine
- Born: 22 February 2000 (age 26)

Sport
- Sport: Skiing
- Club: Osvita
- Updated on 22 January 2022

Darya Andriyivna Rublova (Ukrainian: Дар'я Андріївна Рубльова; born 22 February 2000) is a Ukrainian cross-country skier who has competed internationally since 2017. She competed at the 2022 Winter Olympics, in Women's 4 × 5 kilometre relay, and Women's 15 kilometre skiathlon.

== Career ==
Rublova started her international career in 2017 when she participated at the 2017 European Youth Olympic Winter Festival in Erzurum, Turkey where her best individual result was 27th in 7.5 km freestyle race. After that she participated at 2020 Nordic Junior World Ski Championships in Oberwiesenthal, Germany (her best individual finish was 62nd in 5 km classical race) and 2021 Nordic U23 World Ski Championships in Vuokatti, Finland (her best individual finish was 51st in 10 km freestyle race).

In 2022, Daria Rublova was nominated for her first Winter Games in Beijing.

== Cross-country skiing results ==
All results are sourced from the International Ski Federation (FIS).

=== Olympic Games ===
Year	Age	10 km individual	15 km skiathlon	30 km mass start	Sprint	4 × 5 km relay	Team sprint
2022	21	—	63	—	—	18	—
