= Jonna Sundling =

Swedish cross-country skier (born 1994)

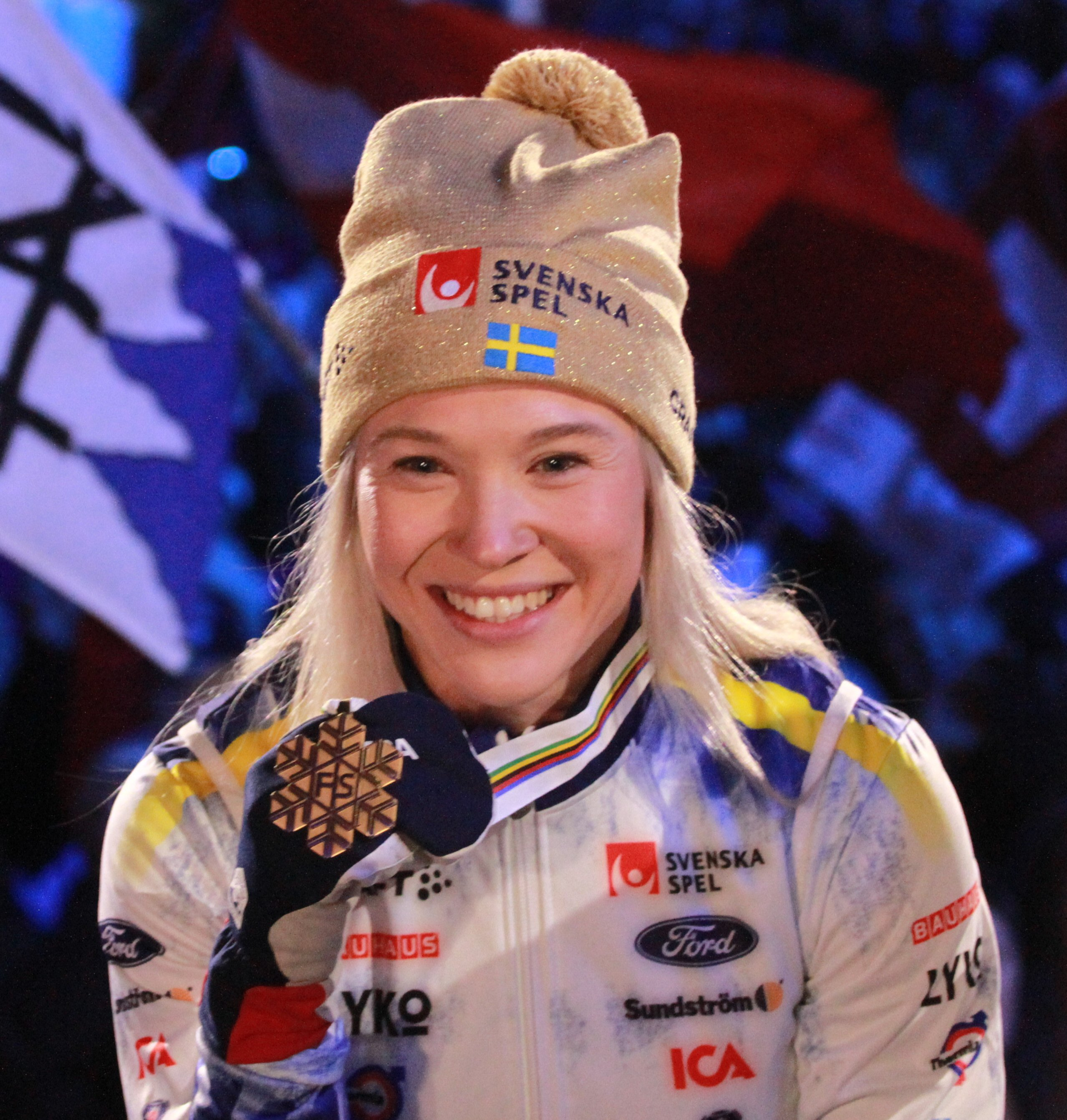
- Jonna Sundling in Trondheim, 2025

Personal information
- Full name: Jonna Patricia Marie Sundling
- Nationality: Sweden
- Born: 28 December 1994 (age 31) Umeå, Sweden

Sport
- Sport: Skiing
- Club: Piteå Elit

World Cup career
- Seasons: 11 – (2015–present)
- Indiv. starts: 137
- Indiv. podiums: 41
- Indiv. wins: 13
- Team starts: 16
- Team podiums: 12
- Team wins: 7
- Overall titles: 0 – (6th in 2024)
- Discipline titles: 0
Medal record
Women's cross-country skiing
Representing Sweden
Event	1st	2nd	3rd
Olympic Games	2	3	1
World Championships	7	0	1
Total	9	3	2
Olympic Games
Gold medal – first place	2022 Beijing	Individual sprint
Gold medal – first place	2026 Milano Cortina	Team sprint
Silver medal – second place	2022 Beijing	Team sprint
Silver medal – second place	2026 Milano Cortina	Individual sprint
Silver medal – second place	2026 Milano Cortina	4 × 7.5 km relay
Bronze medal – third place	2022 Beijing	4 × 5 km relay
World Championships
Gold medal – first place	2021 Oberstdorf	Individual sprint
Gold medal – first place	2021 Oberstdorf	Team sprint
Gold medal – first place	2023 Planica	Individual sprint
Gold medal – first place	2023 Planica	Team sprint
Gold medal – first place	2025 Trondheim	Individual sprint
Gold medal – first place	2025 Trondheim	Team sprint
Gold medal – first place	2025 Trondheim	4 x 7.5 km relay
Bronze medal – third place	2025 Trondheim	20 km skiathlon
U23 World Championships
Gold medal – first place	2016 Râșnov	Individual sprint
Junior World Championships
Gold medal – first place	2013 Liberec	4 × 3.33 km relay
Gold medal – first place	2014 Val di Fiemme	Individual sprint
Gold medal – first place	2014 Val di Fiemme	4 × 3.33 km relay
Silver medal – second place	2012 Erzurum	4 × 3.33 km relay
- Updated on 30 November 2025

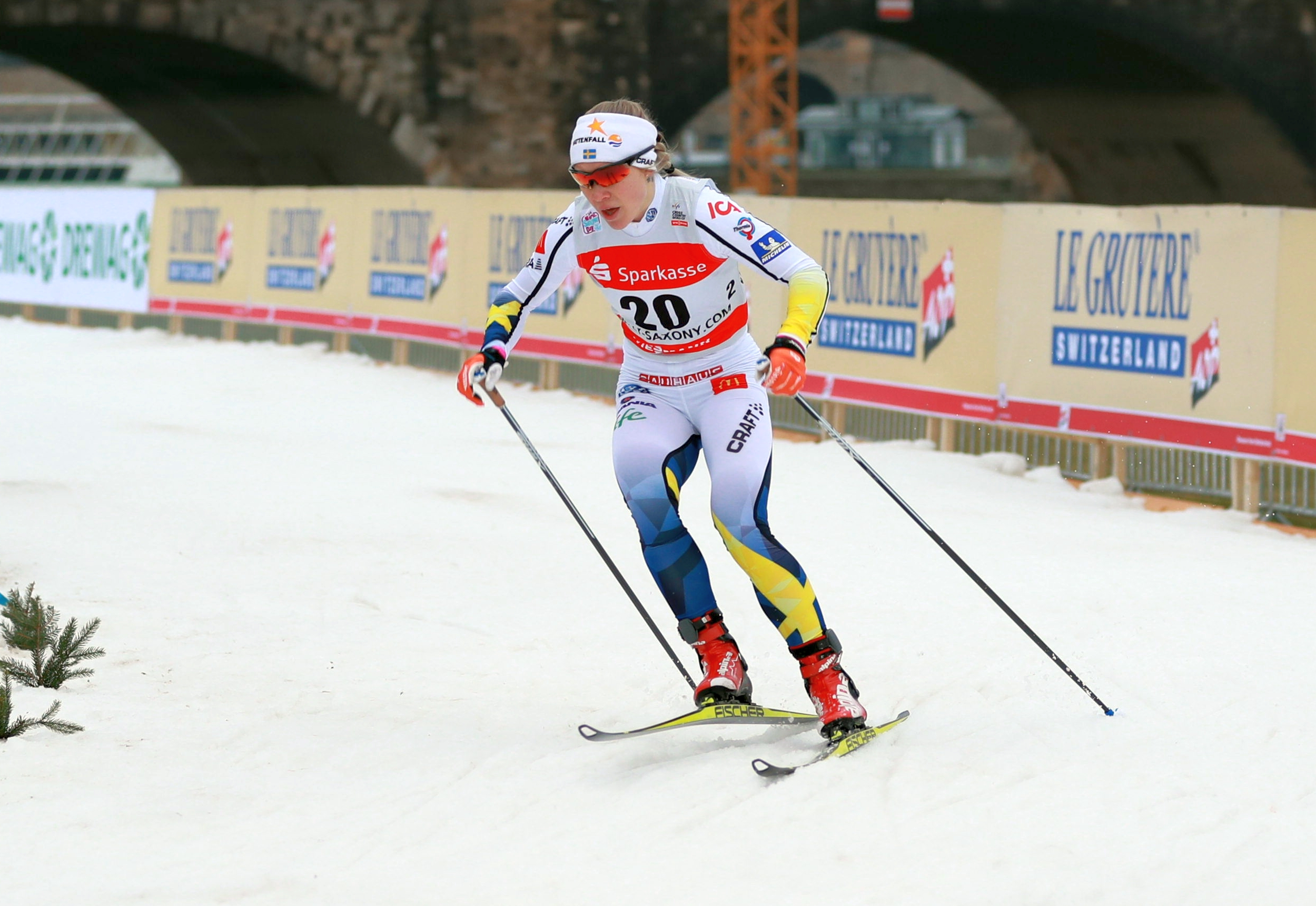
Jonna Sundling in World Cup Dresden 2019.

Jonna Patricia Marie Sundling (born 28 December 1994) is a Swedish cross-country skier who represents the club Piteå Elit.

On 21 January 2026, she was awarded the Jerring Award.

Sundling won the silver medal in the Individual sprint at the 2026 Winter Olympics. after winning gold medal at the same event in 2022.

At the same 2026 Olympics she won the gold medal in the Women's team sprint along with Maja Dahlqvist.

== Cross-country skiing results ==
All results are sourced from the International Ski Federation (FIS).

=== Olympic Games ===
- 6 medals – (2 gold, 3 silver, 1 bronze)

Year	Age	10 km individual	15 km / 20 km skiathlon	30 km / 50 km mass start	Sprint	4 × 5 km / 4 × 7.5 km relay	Team sprint
2022	27	—	—	4	Gold	Bronze	Silver
2026	31	—	11	DNS	Silver	Silver	Gold

=== World Championships ===
- 8 medals – (7 gold, 1 bronze)

Year	Age	Individual	Skiathlon	Mass start	Sprint	Relay	Team sprint
2019	24	—	—	—	4	—	—
2021	26	—	—	—	Gold	6	Gold
2023	28	21	—	—	Gold	—	Gold
2025	30	—	Bronze	5	Gold	Gold	Gold

=== World Cup ===
==== Season standings ====
Season	Age	Discipline standings				Ski Tour standings				
Season	Age	Overall	Distance	Sprint	U23	Nordic Opening	Tour de Ski	Ski Tour 2020	World Cup Final	Ski Tour Canada
2015	20	83	NC	43	11	—	—	—N/a	—N/a	—N/a
2016	21	55	NC	34	9	—	—	—N/a	—N/a	—
2017	22	38	56	25	4	16	—	—N/a	—	—N/a
2018	23	34	48	25	—N/a	44	—	—N/a	9	—N/a
2019	24	17	30	9	—N/a	14	—	—N/a	6	—N/a
2020	25	11	24	2nd place, silver medalist(s)	—N/a	17	14	17	—N/a	—N/a
2021	26	18	31	7	—N/a	12	25	—N/a	—N/a	—N/a
2022	27	9	13	3rd place, bronze medalist(s)	—N/a	—N/a	—	—N/a	—N/a	—N/a
2023	28	13	26	5	—N/a	—N/a	—	—N/a	—N/a	—N/a
2024	29	6	12	3rd place, bronze medalist(s)	—N/a	—N/a	5	—N/a	—N/a	—N/a
2025	30	17	22	8	—N/a	—N/a	—	—N/a	—N/a	—N/a
2026	31	4	9	4	—N/a	—N/a	—N/a	—N/a	—N/a	

==== Individual podiums ====
- 18 victories – (17 WC, 1 SWC)
- 49 podiums – (42 WC, 7 SWC)

No.	Season	Date	Location	Race	Level	Place
1	2017–18	16 March 2018	Falun, Sweden	1.4 km Sprint F	Stage World Cup	2nd
2	2018–19	30 November 2018	Lillehammer, Norway	1.3 km Sprint F	Stage World Cup	1st
3	2018–19	12 January 2019	Dresden, Germany	1.6 km Sprint F	World Cup	3rd
4	2018–19	22 March 2019	Quebec City, Canada	1.6 km Sprint F	Stage World Cup	3rd
5	2019–20	29 November 2019	Rukatunturi, Finland	1.4 km Sprint C	Stage World Cup	2nd
6	2019–20	21 December 2019	Planica, Slovenia	1.2 km Sprint F	World Cup	1st
7	2019–20	8 February 2020	Falun, Sweden	1.4 km Sprint C	World Cup	3rd
8	2019–20	22 February 2020	Trondheim, Norway	1.5 km Sprint C	Stage World Cup	2nd
9	2019–20	4 March 2020	Konnerud, Norway	1.2 km Sprint F	World Cup	1st
10	2020–21	27 November 2020	Rukatunturi, Finland	1.4 km Sprint C	Stage World Cup	3rd
11	2020–21	31 January 2021	Falun, Sweden	1.4 km Sprint C	World Cup	3rd
12	2021–22	18 December 2021	Dresden, Germany	1.3 km Sprint F	World Cup	2nd
13	2021–22	26 February 2022	Lahti, Finland	1.6 km Sprint F	World Cup	1st
14	2021–22	3 March 2022	Drammen, Norway	1.2 km Sprint C	World Cup	2nd
15	2021–22	5 March 2022	Oslo, Norway	30 km Mass Start C	World Cup	3rd
16	2021–22	11 March 2022	Falun, Sweden	1.4 km Sprint C	World Cup	1st
17	2021–22	12 March 2022	Falun, Sweden	10 km Individual F	World Cup	2nd
18	2022–23	21 January 2023	Livigno, Italy	1.2 km Sprint F	World Cup	1st
19	2022–23	3 February 2023	Toblach, Italy	1.4 km Sprint F	World Cup	1st
20	2022–23	14 March 2023	Drammen, Norway	1.2 km Sprint C	World Cup	2nd
21	2022–23	18 March 2023	Falun, Sweden	1.4 km Sprint F	World Cup	2nd
22	2022–23	21 March 2023	Tallinn, Estonia	1.4 km Sprint F	World Cup	2nd
23	2022–23	25 March 2023	Lahti, Finland	1.4 km Sprint C	World Cup	2nd
24	2022–23	26 March 2023	Lahti, Finland	20 km Mass Start C	World Cup	2nd
25	2023–24	24 November 2023	Rukatunturi, Finland	1.4 km Sprint C	World Cup	2nd
26	2023–24	30 December 2023	Toblach, Italy	1.4 km Sprint F	Stage World Cup	2nd
27	2023–24	19 January 2024	Oberhof, Germany	1.3 km Sprint C	World Cup	3rd
28	2023–24	27 January 2024	Goms, Switzerland	1.5 km Sprint F	World Cup	3rd
29	2023–24	13 February 2024	Canmore, Canada	1.3 km Sprint C	World Cup	3rd
30	2023–24	17 February 2024	(United States) Minneapolis, USA - Stifel Loppet Cup	1.5 km Sprint F	World Cup	1st
31	2023–24	18 February 2024	(United States) Minneapolis, USA - Stifel Loppet Cup	10 km Individual F	World Cup	1st
32	2023–24	15 March 2024	Falun, Sweden	1.4 km Sprint C	World Cup	3rd
33	2023–24	16 March 2024	Falun, Sweden	10 km Individual C	World Cup	3rd
34	2024–25	1 December 2024	Rukatunturi, Finland	20 km Mass Start F	World Cup	2nd
35	2024–25	7 December 2024	Lillehammer, Norway	1.3 km Sprint F	World Cup	1st
36	2024–25	14 December 2024	Davos, Switzerland	1.2 km Sprint F	World Cup	1st
37	2024–25	18 January 2025	Les Rousses, France	1.3 km Sprint C	World Cup	3rd
38	2024–25	25 January 2025	Engadin, Switzerland	1.3 km Sprint F	World Cup	1st
39	2024–25	26 January 2025	Engadin, Switzerland	20 km Mass Start F	World Cup	3rd
40	2025–26	29 November 2025	Rukatunturi, Finland	1.4 km Sprint C	World Cup	2nd
41	2025–26	30 November 2025	Rukatunturi, Finland	20 km Mass Start F	World Cup	1st
42	2025–26	13 December 2025	Davos, Switzerland	1.2 km Sprint F	World Cup	1st
43	2025–26	17 January 2026	Oberhof, Germany	1.3 km Sprint F	World Cup	1st
44	2025–26	18 January 2026	Oberhof, Germany	10 km Individual C	World Cup	3rd
45	2025–26	7 March 2026	Lahti, Finland	1.5 km Sprint F	World Cup	1st
46	2025–26	12 March 2026	Drammen, Norway	1.2 km Sprint C	World Cup	1st
47	2025–26	14 March 2026	Oslo, Norway	50 km Mass Start F	World Cup	3rd
48	2025–26	21 March 2026	(United States) Lake Placid, USA	1.5 km Sprint F	World Cup	2nd
49	2025–26	22 March 2026	(United States) Lake Placid, USA	20 km Mass Start F	World Cup	1st

==== Team podiums ====
- 8 victories – (2 RL, 6 TS)
- 13 podiums – (4 RL, 9 TS)

No.	Season	Date	Location	Race	Level	Place	Teammate(s)
1	2018–19	13 January 2019	Dresden, Germany	6 × 1.6 km Team Sprint F	World Cup	2nd	Ingemarsdotter
2	2018–19	27 January 2019	Ulricehamn, Sweden	4 × 5 km Relay C/F	World Cup	2nd	Settlin / Andersson / Kalla
3	2019–20	22 December 2019	Planica, Slovenia	6 × 1.2 km Team Sprint F	World Cup	2nd	Nilsson
4	2021–22	19 December 2021	Dresden, Germany	12 × 0.65 km Team Sprint F	World Cup	1st	Dahlqvist
5	2021–22	13 March 2022	Falun, Sweden	12 × 1 km Mixed Team Sprint F	World Cup	1st	Halfvarsson
6	2022–23	22 January 2023	Livigno, Italy	6 × 1.2 km Team Sprint F	World Cup	2nd	Ribom
7	2022–23	5 February 2023	Toblach, Italy	4 × 7.5 km Relay C/F	World Cup	2nd	Ribom / Andersson / Ilar
8	2022–23	19 March 2023	Falun, Sweden	4 × 5 km Mixed Relay C/F	World Cup	1st	Halfvarsson / Ilar / Anger
9	2022–23	24 March 2023	Lahti, Finland	6 × 1.4 km Team Sprint F	World Cup	1st	Ribom
10	2023–24	21 January 2024	Oberhof, Germany	4 × 7.5 km Relay C/F	World Cup	1st	Svahn / Karlsson / Andersson
11	2023–24	1 March 2024	Lahti, Finland	6 × 1.3 km Team Sprint C	World Cup	1st	Svahn
12	2024–25	13 December 2024	Davos, Switzerland	12 × 0.6 km Team Sprint F	World Cup	1st	Ribom
13	2025–26	12 December 2025	Davos, Switzerland	12 × 0.6 km Team Sprint F	World Cup	1st	Dahlqvist
