= Katherine Sauerbrey =

German cross-country skier (born 1997)

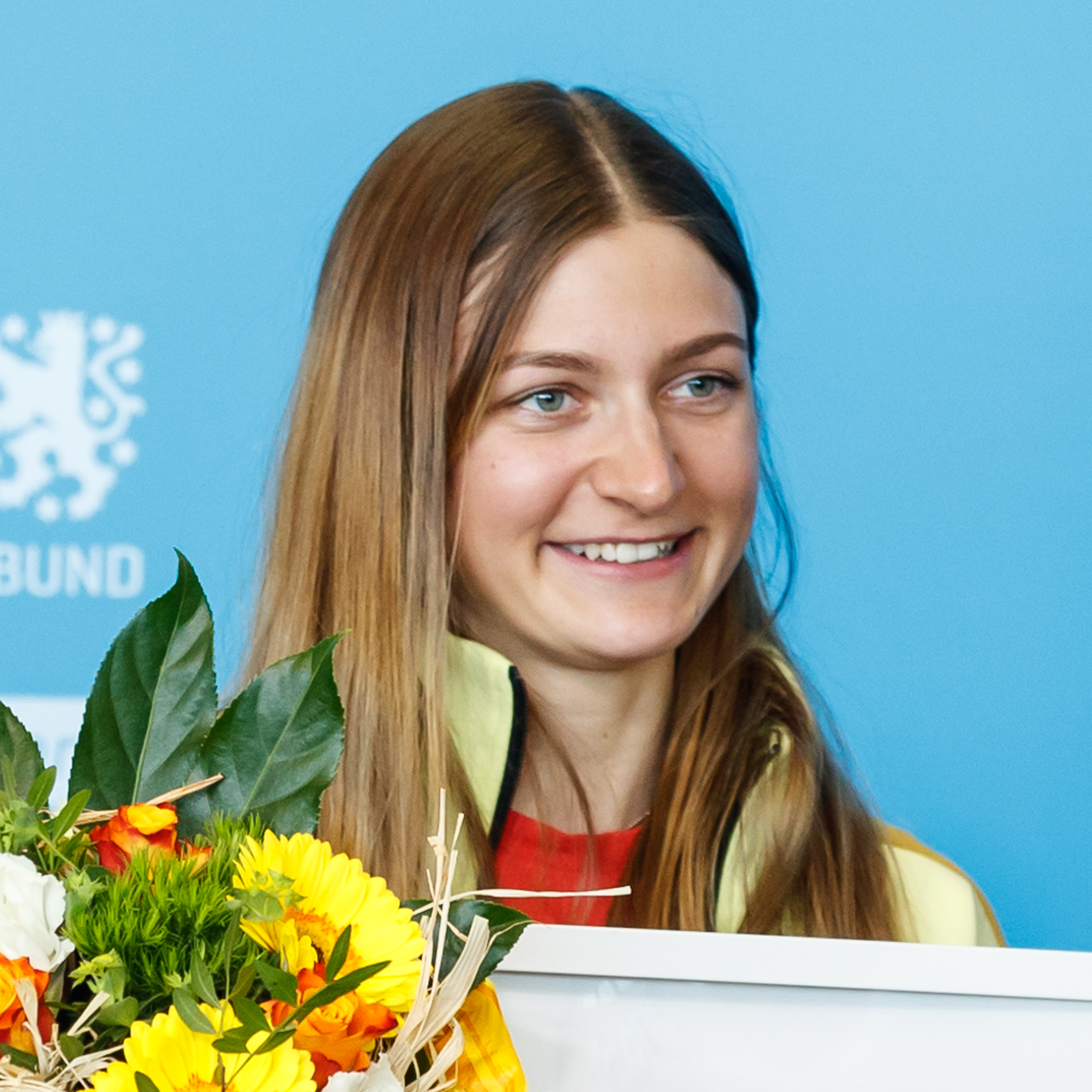
- Sauerbrey in 2022

Personal information
- Nationality: Germany
- Born: 5 May 1997 (age 29) Steinbach-Hallenberg, Germany

Sport
- Sport: Skiing
- Club: SC Steinbach-Hallenberg

World Cup career
- Seasons: 3 – (2022–present)
- Indiv. starts: 20
- Indiv. podiums: 0
- Indiv. wins: 0
- Team starts: 3
- Team podiums: 1
- Team wins: 0
- Overall titles: 0 – (46th in 2022)
- Discipline titles: 0
Medal record
Women's cross-country skiing
Representing Germany
Olympic Games
Silver medal – second place	2022 Beijing	4 × 5 km relay
- Updated on 21 January 2024

Katherine Sauerbrey (born 5 May 1997) is a German cross-country skier who represented Germany at the 2022 Winter Olympics.

== Career ==
Sauerbrey made her World Cup debut in 2021. She represented Germany at the 2022 Winter Olympics and won a silver medal in the women's 4 × 5 kilometre relay.

== Cross-country skiing results ==
All results are sourced from the International Ski Federation (FIS).

=== Olympic Games ===
Year	Age	Individual	Skiathlon	Mass start	Sprint	Relay	Team sprint
2022	24	11	13	—	—	Silver	—
2026	28	—	33	DNS	39	—	—

=== World Championships ===
Year	Age	10 km individual	15 km skiathlon	30 km mass start	Sprint	4 × 5 km relay	Team sprint
2023	22	—	21	23	—	—	—
2025	29	16	21	—	—	—	—

=== World Cup ===
==== Season standings ====
Season	Age	Discipline standings			Ski Tour standings
Season	Age	Overall	Distance	Sprint	Tour de Ski
2022	24	46	42	73	19
2023	25	84	55	NC	DNF

==== Team podiums ====
- 1 podium – (1 RL)

No.	Season	Date	Location	Race	Level	Place	Teammate
1	2023–24	21 January 2024	Oberhof, Germany	4 × 7.5 km Relay C/F	World Cup	2nd	Hennig / Fink / Carl

== Personal life ==
Her brother, Chris Ole Sauerbrey, represented Germany in cross-country skiing at the junior level.
