= Tatiana Sorina =

Russian cross-country skier

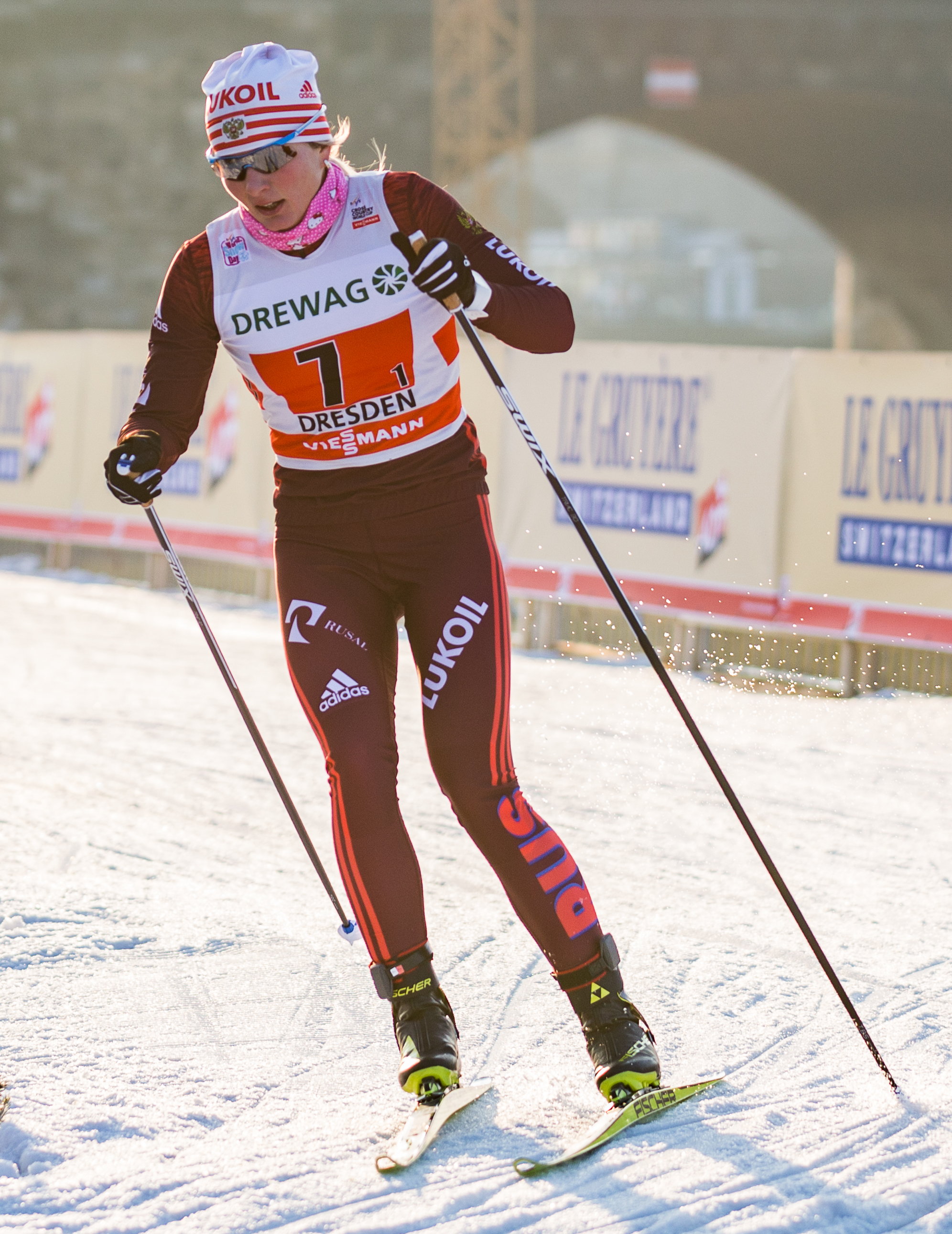
- Sorina at the FIS World Cup in Dresden, 2018

Personal information
- Nationality: Russia
- Born: 13 April 1994 (age 32) Krasnoturinsk, Sverdlovsk Oblast, Russia

Sport
- Sport: Skiing
- Club: Dinamo

World Cup career
- Seasons: 5 – (2017–2019, 2021–2022)
- Indiv. starts: 50
- Indiv. podiums: 2
- Indiv. wins: 0
- Team starts: 5
- Team podiums: 1
- Team wins: 1
- Overall titles: 0 – (5th in 2021)
- Discipline titles: 0
Medal record
Women's cross-country skiing
Representing ROC
Olympic Games
Gold medal – first place	2022 Beijing	4 × 5 km relay
Representing Russian Ski Federation
World Championships
Silver medal – second place	2021 Oberstdorf	4 × 5 km relay
- Updated on 23 March 2023

Tatiana Andreyevna Sorina (Russian: Татьяна Андреевна Сорина, née Alyoshina; born 13 April 1994) is a Russian cross-country skier.

== Personal life ==
Sorina is married to Egor Sorin, coach of the Russian ski team. On 11 March 2020, she gave birth to a daughter. During maternity leave she skipped the 2019–20 FIS Cross-Country World Cup.

== Cross-country skiing results ==
All results are sourced from the International Ski Federation (FIS).

=== Olympic Games ===
- 1 medal – (1 gold)

Year	Age	10 km individual	15 km skiathlon	30 km mass start	Sprint	4 × 5 km relay	Team sprint
2022	27	10	11	5	—	Gold	—

=== World Championships ===
- 1 medal – (1 silver)

Year	Age	10 km individual	15 km skiathlon	30 km mass start	Sprint	4 × 5 km relay	Team sprint
2021	26	5	8	9	21	Silver	—

=== World Cup ===
==== Season standings ====
Season	Age	Discipline standings				Ski Tour standings		
Season	Age	Overall	Distance	Sprint	U23	Nordic Opening	Tour de Ski	World Cup Final
2017	22	NC	—	NC	NC	—	—	—
2018	23	79	NC	50	—N/a	—	—	—
2019	24	85	NC	48	—N/a	46	—	—
2021	26	5	8	14	—N/a	2nd place, silver medalist(s)	4	—N/a
2022 (Note: On 1 March 2022, following the 2022 Russian invasion of Ukraine, FIS decided to not allow athletes from Russian and Belarus to take part in FIS competitions, with an immediate effect.)	27	15	12	31	—N/a	—N/a	6	—N/a

==== Individual podiums ====
- 2 podiums – (1 WC, 1 SWC)

No.	Season	Date	Location	Race	Level	Place
1	2020–21	29 November 2020	Rukatunturi, Finland	Overall Standings	World Cup	2nd
2	2021–22	31 December 2021	Oberstdorf, Germany	10 km Mass Start F	Stage World Cup	3rd

==== Team podiums ====
- 1 victory – (1 RL)
- 1 podium – (1 RL)

No.	Season	Date	Location	Race	Level	Place	Teammates
1	2021–22	5 December 2021	Lillehammer, Norway	4 × 5 km Relay C/F	World Cup	1st	Stupak / Nepryayeva / Stepanova
