= Ukraine at the 2022 Winter Olympics =

- Flag of Ukraine
- IOC code: UKR
- NOC: National Olympic Committee of Ukraine
- Website: www.noc-ukr.org/en

in Beijing, China 4–20 February 2022
- Competitors: 45 (24 men and 21 women) in 12 sports
- Flag bearers (opening): Oleksandr Abramenko; Oleksandra Nazarova
- Flag bearer (closing): Olena Bilosiuk
- Medals Ranked 25th: Gold 0 Silver 1 Bronze 0 Total 1

Winter Olympics appearances (overview)
- 1994; 1998; 2002; 2006; 2010; 2014; 2018; 2022; 2026

Other related appearances
- Czechoslovakia (1924–1936); Poland (1924–1936); Romania (1924–1936); Soviet Union (1956–1988); Unified Team (1992)

Ukraine competed at the 2022 Winter Olympics in Beijing, China, from 4 to 20 February 2022, in its eighth appearance as an independent nation.

Oleksandr Abramenko and Oleksandra Nazarova were the country's flagbearer during the opening ceremony. Meanwhile biathlete Olena Bilosiuk was the flagbearer during the closing ceremony.

The games were held amidst the prelude to the Russian invasion of Ukraine. Prior to the opening ceremony the Ministry of Youth and Sports of Ukraine advised its athletes to avoid Russians where possible and instructed them how to behave in case they are provoked. The ministry also did not recommend Ukrainian athletes to give interviews in Russian.

Ukrainian athletes won a total of one silver medal, matching their medal haul from the 2018 Olympics, although that medal was a gold. Therefore, this result can be considered the worst since 2010 when Ukraine did not win any medals.

== Competitors ==
The following is the list of number of competitors participating at the Games per sport.

Sport	Men	Women	Total
Alpine skiing	1	1	2
Biathlon	5	5	10
Bobsleigh	0	1	1
Cross-country skiing	2	5	7
Figure skating	3	3	6
Freestyle skiing	3	2	5
Luge	4	2	6
Nordic combined	1	—N/a	1
Short track speed skating	1	1	2
Skeleton	1	0	1
Ski jumping	3	0	3
Snowboarding	0	1	1
Total	24	21	45

== Medallists ==
Medal	Name	Sport	Event	Date
Silver	Oleksandr Abramenko	Freestyle skiing	Men's aerials	February 16

== Alpine skiing ==
By meeting the basic qualification standards Ukraine qualified one male and one female alpine skier.

Athlete	Event	Run 1		Run 2		Total	
Athlete	Event	Time	Rank	Time	Rank	Time	Rank
Ivan Kovbasnyuk	Men's combined	1:49.13	21	55.30	14	2:44.43	14
Ivan Kovbasnyuk	Men's downhill	—N/a				1:48.09	33
Ivan Kovbasnyuk	Men's slalom	DNF		Did not advance			
Ivan Kovbasnyuk	Men's super-G	—N/a				1:25.56	32
Anastasiya Shepilenko	Women's giant slalom	1:05.95	45	1:06.38	40	2:12.33	39
Anastasiya Shepilenko	Women's slalom	DNF		Did not advance			
Anastasiya Shepilenko	Women's super-G	—N/a				1:19.60	37

== Biathlon ==
Men

Athlete	Event	Time	Misses	Rank
Anton Dudchenko	Individual	54:54.9	4 (1+0+1+2)	50
Dmytro Pidruchnyi	Individual	51:49.3	3 (0+1+1+1)	18
Artem Pryma	Individual	53:36.2	4 (1+2+0+1)	37
Bogdan Tsymbal	Individual	55:19.0	4 (3+0+1+0)	55
Dmytro Pidruchnyi	Mass start	42:16.2	7 (0+3+2+2)	24
Artem Pryma	Mass start	43:12.6	7 (2+1+3+1)	28
Anton Dudchenko	Pursuit	43:36.5	3 (2+0+1+0)	23
Dmytro Pidruchnyi	Pursuit	42:45.9	5 (1+2+2+0)	13
Artem Pryma	Pursuit	42:59.8	6 (2+2+2+0)	18
Anton Dudchenko	Sprint	26:51.6	2 (2+0)	60
Dmytro Pidruchnyi	Sprint	25:19.0	1 (0+1)	13
Artem Pryma	Sprint	25:19.8	1 (0+1)	15
Bogdan Tsymbal	Sprint	26:59.0	3 (3+0)	66
Bogdan Tsymbal; Artem Pryma; Anton Dudchenko; Dmytro Pidruchnyi	Team relay	1:23:31.5	4+12	9

Women

Athlete	Event	Time	Misses	Rank
Darya Blashko	Individual	DNS		
Yuliia Dzhima	Individual	45:34.4	2 (0+1+0+1)	10
Iryna Petrenko	Individual	45:42.2	0 (0+0+0+0)	11
Valentyna Semerenko	Individual	DNF		
Yuliia Dzhima	Mass start	41:43.7	3 (1+0+2+0)	7
Yuliia Dzhima	Pursuit	37:36.2	4 (1+0+1+2)	13
Anastasiya Merkushyna	Pursuit	38:37.2	2 (1+0+0+1)	25
Iryna Petrenko	Pursuit	43:03.7	4 (1+1+2+0)	55
Yuliia Dzhima	Sprint	21:51.8	1 (0+1)	8
Anastasiya Merkushyna	Sprint	22:31.6	1 (1+0)	24
Iryna Petrenko	Sprint	23:11.7	2 (2+0)	40
Olena Bilosiuk; Yuliia Dzhima; Anastasiya Merkushyna; Iryna Petrenko	Team relay	1:14:04.1	1+6	7

Mixed

Athlete	Event	Time	Misses	Rank
Yuliia Dzhima; Dmytro Pidruchnyi; Artem Pryma; Valentyna Semerenko	Relay	1:10:21.7	4+15	13

== Bobsleigh ==
Lidiia Hunko failed a doping test during the Olympics and was suspended on 15 February.

Athlete	Event	Run 1		Run 2		Run 3		Run 4		Total	
Athlete	Event	Time	Rank	Time	Rank	Time	Rank	Time	Rank	Time	Rank
Lidiia Hunko	Monobob	1:06.34	18	1:07.84	20	1:07.47	20	1:07.45	19	4:29.10	20

== Cross-country skiing ==
Ukraine qualified two male and five female cross-country skiers.

Valiantsina Kaminskaya failed a doping test during the Olympics and was suspended on 16 February.

Distance
Men

Athlete	Event	Classical		Freestyle		Final		
Athlete	Event	Time	Rank	Time	Rank	Time	Deficit	Rank
Oleksii Krasovskyi	15 km classical	—N/a				44:59.8	+7:05.0	77
Ruslan Perekhoda	15 km classical	—N/a				45:05.6	+7:10.8	78
Oleksii Krasovskyi	30 km skiathlon	45:22.6	58	LAP				58
Ruslan Perekhoda	30 km skiathlon	LAP						64

Women

Athlete	Event	Classical		Freestyle		Final		
Athlete	Event	Time	Rank	Time	Rank	Time	Deficit	Rank
Maryna Antsybor	10 km classical	—N/a				32:36.5	+4:30.2	58
Valiantsina Kaminskaya	10 km classical	—N/a				Disqualified		
Viktoriia Olekh	10 km classical	—N/a				34:58.1	+6:51.8	76
Maryna Antsybor	15 km skiathlon	27:08.4	57	25:08.3	56	52:54.0	+8:40.3	56
Yuliia Krol	15 km skiathlon	27:57.6	60	28:22.9	62	57:04.4	+12:50.7	62
Viktoriia Olekh	15 km skiathlon	28:26.8	62	25:47.3	60	54:55.7	+10:42.0	60
Daria Rublova	15 km skiathlon	29:59.6	64	LAP				63
Maryna Antsybor	Women's 30 km freestyle	—N/a				1:35:31.3	+10:37.3	37
Viktoriia Olekh	Women's 30 km freestyle	—N/a				1:46:22.1	+21:28.1	58
Viktoriya Olekh; Valiantsina Kaminskaya; Maryna Antsybor; Daria Rublova	4 x 5 km relay	—N/a				Disqualified		

Sprint

Athlete	Event	Qualification		Quarterfinal		Semifinal		Final	
Athlete	Event	Time	Rank	Time	Rank	Time	Rank	Time	Rank
Oleksii Krasovskyi	Men's individual	3:05.52	64	Did not advance					
Ruslan Perekhoda	Men's individual	2:59.34	46	Did not advance					
Oleksii Krasovskyi; Ruslan Perekhoda	Men's team	—N/a				20:48.40	9	Did not advance	17
Maryna Antsybor	Women's individual	3:33.80	54	Did not advance					
Valiantsina Kaminskaya	Women's individual	Disqualified							
Viktoriya Olekh	Women's individual	3:42.78	69	Did not advance					
Maryna Antsybor; Yuliya Krol	Women's team	—N/a				25:46.04	9	Did not advance	18

== Figure skating ==
In the 2021 World Figure Skating Championships in Stockholm, Sweden, Ukraine secured one quota in the men's competition and one quota in the ice dance competition.

Athlete	Event	SP		FS		Total	
Athlete	Event	Points	Rank	Points	Rank	Points	Rank
Ivan Shmuratko	Men's singles	78.11	22 Q	127.65	24	205.76	24
Anastasiia Shabotova	Women's singles	48.68	30	Did not advance			
Oleksandra Nazarova; Maksym Nikitin	Ice dance	65.53	20 Q	97.34	18	162.87	20

Team event

Athlete	Event	Short program / Rhythm dance						Free skate / Free dance				Total	
Athlete	Event	Men's	Women's	Pairs	Ice dance	Total		Men's	Women's	Pairs	Ice dance	Total	
Athlete	Event	Points Team points	Points Team points	Points Team points	Points Team points	Points	Rank	Points Team points	Points Team points	Points Team points	Points Team points	Points	Rank
Ivan Shmuratko (M); Anastasiia Shabotova (W); Sofiia Holichenko / Artem Darenskyi (P); Oleksandra Nazarova / Maksym Nikitin (ID)	Team event	Withdrew; 0	62.49; 4	53.65; 2	64.08; 2	8	10	Did not advance					

== Freestyle skiing ==
Ukraine had qualified for the mixed team event but was not allowed by the Chinese authorities to compete due to positive COVID-19 tests by Kotovskyi, Okipniuk, and Novosad.

Aerials

Athlete	Event	Qualification				Final					
Athlete	Event	Jump 1		Jump 2		Jump 1		Jump 2		Total	
Athlete	Event	Points	Rank	Points	Rank	Points	Rank	Points	Rank	Points	Rank
Oleksandr Abramenko	Men's	120.36	5 Q	—N/a		123.53	5	116.50	2	240.03	2nd place, silver medalist(s)
Dmytro Kotovskyi	Men's	73.89	24	114.03	9	Did not advance					15
Oleksandr Okipniuk	Men's	92.76	22	125.00	1 Q	122.01	9	Did not advance			9
Anastasiya Novosad	Women's	DNS				Did not advance					
Olga Polyuk	Women's	68.76	20	68.76	16	Did not advance					22

== Luge ==
Athlete	Event	Run 1		Run 2		Run 3		Run 4		Total	
Athlete	Event	Time	Rank	Time	Rank	Time	Rank	Time	Rank	Time	Rank
Anton Dukach	Men's singles	58.873	25	58.726	18	58.408	19	Did not advance		2:56.007	22
Andriy Mandziy	Men's singles	1:01.082	32	58.706	17	58.346	17	Did not advance		2:58.134	27
Ihor Stakhiv; Andrii Lysetskyi	Men's doubles	59.983	14	1:00.080	15	—N/a				2:00.063	15

Women

Athlete	Event	Run 1		Run 2		Run 3		Run 4		Total	
Athlete	Event	Time	Rank	Time	Rank	Time	Rank	Time	Rank	Time	Rank
Olena Stetskiv	Singles	59.663	21	59.586	19	59.963	27	Did not advance		2:59.212	22
Yulianna Tunytska	Singles	59.690	22	59.844	23	59.571	24	Did not advance		2:59.105	21

Mixed

Athlete	Event	Run 1		Run 2		Run 3		Total	
Athlete	Event	Time	Rank	Time	Rank	Time	Rank	Time	Rank
Yulianna Tunytska; Anton Dukach; Ihor Stakhiv / Andrii Lysetskyi	Team relay	1:01.123	8	1:04.244	13	1:04.237	12	3:09.604	11

== Nordic combined ==
Athlete	Event	Ski jumping			Cross-country		Total	
Athlete	Event	Distance	Points	Rank	Time	Rank	Time	Rank
Dmytro Mazurchuk	Large hill/10 km	116.0	83.5	33	27:35.4	33	31:20.4	32
Dmytro Mazurchuk	Normal hill/10 km	87.0	82.5	35	27:08.3	35	30:30.3	36

== Short track speed skating ==
Ukraine has qualified one male and one female short track speed skater.

Athlete	Event	Heat		Quarterfinal		Semifinal		Final	
Athlete	Event	Time	Rank	Time	Rank	Time	Rank	Time	Rank
Oleh Handei	500 m	44.163	4	Did not advance					27
Uliana Dubrova	1500 m	—N/a		2:26.832	6	Did not advance			32

== Skeleton ==
Athlete	Event	Run 1		Run 2		Run 3		Run 4		Total	
Athlete	Event	Time	Rank	Time	Rank	Time	Rank	Time	Rank	Time	Rank
Vladyslav Heraskevych	Men's	1:01.63	18	1:01.58	16	1:01.62	18	1:01.45	17	4:06.28	18

== Ski jumping ==
Men

Athlete	Event	Qualification			First round			Final			Total	
Athlete	Event	Distance	Points	Rank	Distance	Points	Rank	Distance	Points	Rank	Points	Rank
Vitaliy Kalinichenko	Large hill	118.0	94.2	42 Q	122.5	106.0	44	Did not advance				
Anton Korchuk	Large hill	82.5	25.4	56	Did not advance							
Yevhen Marusiak	Large hill	104.0	76.0	49 Q	111.0	81.6	50	Did not advance				
Anton Korchuk	Normal hill	67.5	38.0	52	Did not advance							
Yevhen Marusiak	Normal hill	73.0	49.8	48 Q	91.5	97.4	47	Did not advance				

== Snowboarding ==
Parallel

Athlete	Event	Qualification		Round of 16	Quarterfinal	Semifinal	Final	
Athlete	Event	Time	Rank	Opposition Time	Opposition Time	Opposition Time	Opposition Time	Rank
Annamari Dancha	Women's giant slalom	1:37.79	26	Did not advance				
