= Natalya Terentyeva =

Russian cross-country skier

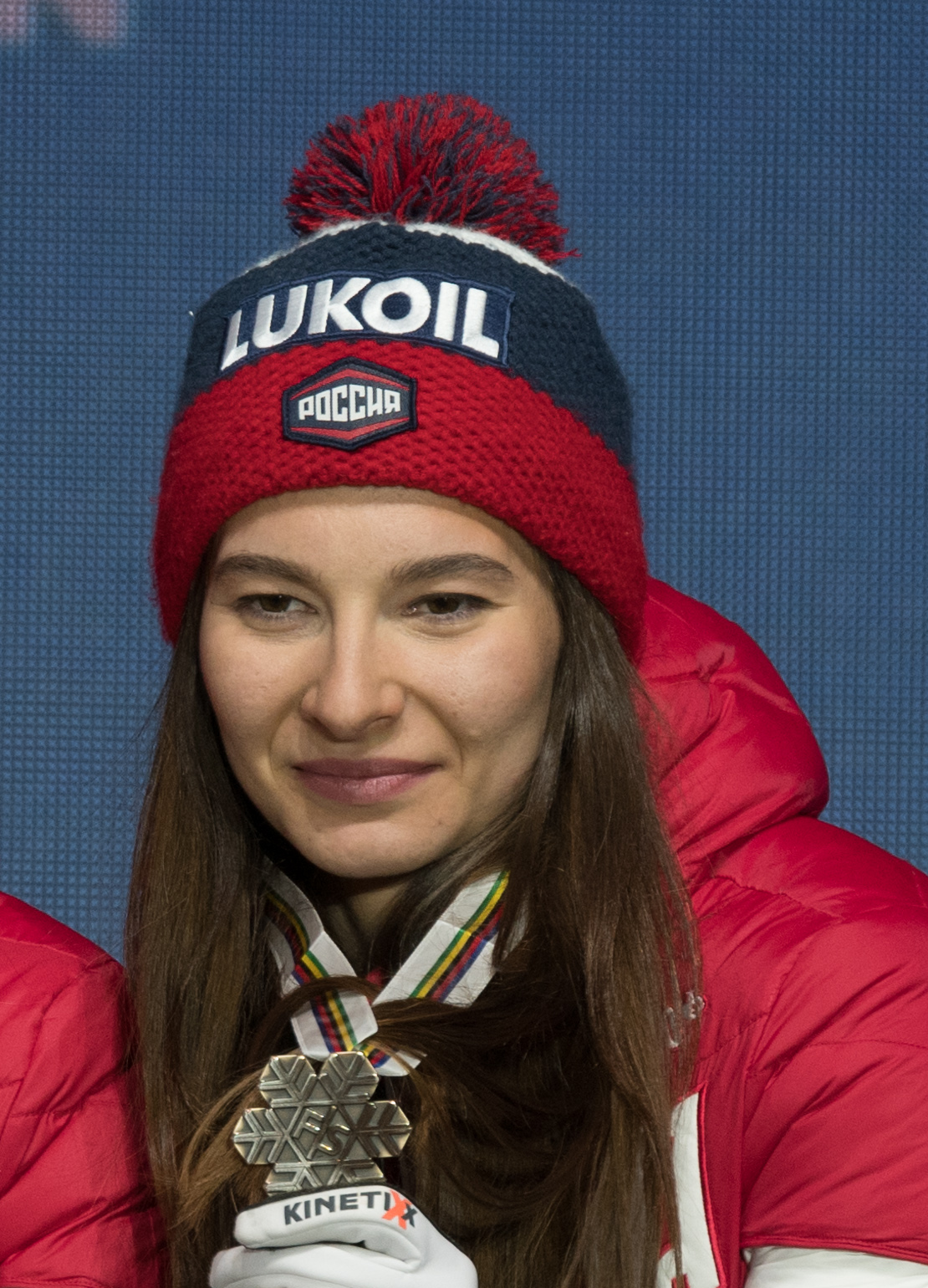
- Terentyeva in 2019

Personal information
- Nationality: Russia
- Born: 6 September 1995 (age 30) Tver, Russia
- Height: 1.69 m (5 ft 7 in)

Sport
- Sport: Skiing
- Club: SC Vodnik

World Cup career
- Seasons: 9 – (2014–2022)
- Indiv. starts: 138
- Indiv. podiums: 25
- Indiv. wins: 6
- Team starts: 12
- Team podiums: 2
- Team wins: 1
- Overall titles: 1 – (2022)
- Discipline titles: 1 – (1 U23)
Medal record
Women's cross-country skiing
International nordic ski competitions
Event	1st	2nd	3rd
Olympic Games	1	1	2
World Championships	0	1	2
Total	1	2	4
Representing ROC
Olympic Games
Gold medal – first place	2022 Beijing	4 × 5 km relay
Silver medal – second place	2022 Beijing	15 km skiathlon
Bronze medal – third place	2022 Beijing	Team sprint
Representing Olympic Athletes from Russia
Olympic Games
Bronze medal – third place	2018 Pyeongchang	4 × 5 km relay
Representing Russian Ski Federation
World Championships
Silver medal – second place	2021 Oberstdorf	4 × 5 km relay
Representing Russia
World Championships
Bronze medal – third place	2019 Seefeld	15 km skiathlon
Bronze medal – third place	2019 Seefeld	4 × 5 km relay
U23 World Championships
Silver medal – second place	2018 Goms	15 km skiathlon
Bronze medal – third place	2018 Goms	Individual sprint
Junior World Championships
Gold medal – first place	2014 Val di Fiemme	5 km classical
Silver medal – second place	2013 Liberec	4 × 3.33 km relay
Silver medal – second place	2014 Val di Fiemme	4 × 3.33 km relay
Silver medal – second place	2015 Almaty	4 × 3.33 km relay
Bronze medal – third place	2015 Almaty	Individual sprint
Bronze medal – third place	2015 Almaty	5 km classical
- Updated on 23 March 2023

Natalya Mikhaylovna Terentyeva (Russian: Наталья Михайловна Терентьева, née Nepryaeva, born 6 September 1995) is a Russian cross-country skier. She participated in the 2018 Winter Olympics as part of the Olympic Athletes from Russia team and 2022 Winter Olympics as part of the Russian Olympic Committee team, winning a total of four medals, including a gold in the 4 × 5 km relay.

== Career ==
Nepryayeva was first included to the Russian national team in 2015. Her breakthrough came in 2018 when she won bronze as part of the Russian relay team.

In the 2018–19 season, Nepryayeva became the first Russian female skier to finish in the top 3 of the Tour de Ski. At the 2019 FIS Nordic World Ski Championships, Nepryayeva became the first female Russian skier since 2007 to medal in skiathlon (then known as double pursuit). Overall, she won three medals at the World Championships in 2019 and 2021.

Nepryayeva became the first Russian female skier to win the Tour de Ski, doing so during the 2021–22 World Cup season. Furthermore, she won the World Cup, despite being excluded from the last two stages due to sanctions related to the Russian invasion of Ukraine. She became the first Russian female skier to do so since Yuliya Chepalova in the 2000–01 season.

== Cross-country skiing results ==
All results are sourced from the International Ski Federation (FIS).

=== Olympic Games ===
- 4 medals – (1 gold, 1 silver, 2 bronze)

Year	Age	10 km individual	15 km skiathlon	30 km mass start	Sprint	4 × 5 km relay	Team sprint
2018	22	—	8	24	4	Bronze	9
2022	26	4	Silver	DNF	14	Gold	Bronze

=== World Championships ===
- 3 medals – (1 silver, 2 bronze)

Year	Age	10 km individual	15 km skiathlon	30 km mass start	Sprint	4 × 5 km relay	Team sprint
2019	23	7	Bronze	—	9	Bronze	4
2021	25	12	16	—	22	Silver	4

=== World Cup ===
==== Season titles ====
- 2 titles – (1 Overall, 1 U23)

Season
Season	Discipline
2018	Under-23
2022	Overall

==== Season standings ====
Season	Age	Discipline standings				Ski Tour standings				
Season	Age	Overall	Distance	Sprint	U23	Nordic Opening	Tour de Ski	Ski Tour 2020	World Cup Final	Ski Tour Canada
2014	18	NC	NC	NC	—N/a	—	—	—N/a	—	—N/a
2015	19	NC	NC	NC	NC	—	—	—N/a	—N/a	—N/a
2016	20	67	60	56	13	46	—	—N/a	—N/a	29
2017	21	78	75	58	13	37	—	—N/a	—	—N/a
2018	22	13	13	14	1st place, gold medalist(s)	8	11	—N/a	DNF	—N/a
2019	23	2nd place, silver medalist(s)	3rd place, bronze medalist(s)	5	—N/a	8	2nd place, silver medalist(s)	—N/a	12	—N/a
2020	24	3rd place, bronze medalist(s)	4	4	—N/a	18	2nd place, silver medalist(s)	DNF	—N/a	—N/a
2021	25	6	10	6	—N/a	10	7	—N/a	—N/a	—N/a
2022 (Note: On 1 March 2022, following the Russian invasion of Ukraine, FIS decided to bar Russian and Belarusian from participating in FIS competitions until further notice.)	26	1st place, gold medalist(s)	8	10	—N/a	—N/a	1st place, gold medalist(s)	—N/a	—N/a	—N/a

==== Individual podiums ====
- 6 victories – (2 WC, 4 SWC)
- 25 podiums – (16 WC, 9 SWC)

No.	Season	Date	Location	Race	Level	Place
1	2017–18	4 March 2018	Lahti, Finland	10 km Individual C	World Cup	2nd
2	2018–19	30 December 2018	Toblach, Italy	10 km Individual F	Stage World Cup	1st
3	2018–19	2 January 2019	Oberstdorf, Germany	10 km Mass Start C	Stage World Cup	2nd
4	2018–19	3 January 2019	Oberstdorf, Germany	10 km Pursuit F	Stage World Cup	2nd
5	2018–19	5 January 2019	Val di Fiemme, Italy	10 km Mass Start C	Stage World Cup	2nd
6	2018–19	29 December 2018 – 6 January 2019	(Italy) (Switzerland) (Germany) (Italy) Tour de Ski	Overall Standings	World Cup	2nd
7	2018–19	19 January 2019	Otepää, Estonia	1.3 km Sprint C	World Cup	2nd
8	2018–19	20 January 2019	Otepää, Estonia	10 km Individual C	World Cup	3rd
9	2018–19	17 February 2019	Cogne, Italy	10 km Individual C	World Cup	3rd
10	2018–19	10 March 2019	Oslo, Norway	30 km Mass Start C	World Cup	2nd
11	2018–19	12 March 2019	Drammen, Norway	1.2 km Sprint C	World Cup	3rd
12	2019–20	30 November 2019	Rukatunturi, Finland	15 km Individual C	Stage World Cup	3rd
13	2019–20	29 December 2019	Lenzerheide, Switzerland	1.5 km Sprint F	Stage World Cup	3rd
14	2019–20	28 December 2019 – 5 January 2020	(Switzerland) (Italy) Tour de Ski	Overall Standings	World Cup	2nd
15	2019–20	18 January 2020	Nové Město, Czech Republic	10 km Individual F	World Cup	2nd
16	2019–20	19 January 2020	Nové Město, Czech Republic	10 km Pursuit C	World Cup	2nd
17	2019–20	26 January 2020	Oberstdorf, Germany	1.5 km Sprint C	World Cup	1st
18	2019–20	8 February 2020	Falun, Sweden	1.4 km Sprint C	World Cup	2nd
19	2020–21	12 December 2020	Davos, Switzerland	1.5 km Sprint F	World Cup	3rd
20	2020–21	8 January 2021	Val di Fiemme, Italy	10 km Mass Start C	Stage World Cup	1st
21	2021–22	29 December 2021	Lenzerheide, Switzerland	10 km Individual C	Stage World Cup	3rd
22	2021–22	1 January 2022	Oberstdorf, Germany	1.2 km Sprint C	Stage World Cup	1st
23	2021–22	3 January 2022	Val di Fiemme, Italy	10 km Mass Start C	Stage World Cup	1st
24	2021–22	28 December 2021 – 4 January 2022	(Switzerland) (Germany) (Italy) Tour de Ski	Overall Standings	World Cup	1st
25	2021–22	27 February 2022	Lahti, Finland	10 km Individual C	World Cup	2nd

==== Team podiums ====
- 1 victory – (1 RL)
- 2 podiums – (1 RL, 1 TS)

No.	Season	Date	Location	Race	Level	Place	Teammate(s)
1	2020–21	20 December 2020	Dresden, Germany	12 × 0.65 km Team Sprint F	World Cup	2nd	Stupak
2	2021–22	5 December 2021	Lillehammer, Norway	4 × 5 km Relay C/F	World Cup	1st	Stupak / Sorina / Stepanova

== Honours ==
She was awarded the Medal of the Order "For Merit to the Fatherland" after the 2018 Olympics.
