= Cross-country skiing at the 2022 Winter Olympics – Women's 4 × 5 kilometre relay =

Women's 4 × 5 kilometre relay at the XXIV Olympic Winter Games
- Cross-country skiing
- Venue: Kuyangshu Nordic Center and Biathlon Center, Zhangjiakou
- Date: 12 February 2022
- Competitors: 72 from 18 nations
- Teams: 18
- Winning time: 53:41.0

Medalists
1st place, gold medalist(s)		Yuliya Stupak; Natalya Nepryayeva; Tatiana Sorina; Veronika Stepanova	ROC
2nd place, silver medalist(s)		Katherine Sauerbrey; Katharina Hennig; Victoria Carl; Sofie Krehl	Germany
3rd place, bronze medalist(s)		Maja Dahlqvist; Ebba Andersson; Frida Karlsson; Jonna Sundling	Sweden

The women's 4 × 5 kilometre relay competition in cross-country skiing at the 2022 Winter Olympics was held on 12 February, at the Kuyangshu Nordic Center and Biathlon Center in Zhangjiakou. Yuliya Stupak, Natalya Nepryayeva, Tatiana Sorina, Veronika Stepanova, representing the Russian Olympic Committee, won the event, the first Russian win since 2006. Germany were second, and Sweden third.

== Summary ==
Norway were the defending champion, and Sweden and Russian Olympic Committee athletes were the 2018 silver and bronze medalist, respectively. The only relay in the 2021–22 FIS Cross-Country World Cup was won by Russia, with Sweden second and Norway third. Norway were also the 2021 World Champion, with Russian Ski Federation second and Finland third. Only five nations – Finland, Germany, Norway, Russia, and Sweden – ever won the women's Olympic cross-country skiing relay.

In the first leg, Yuliya Stupak of the Russian Olympic Committee won, closely followed by Katherine Sauerbrey of Germany, but developing 12 seconds lead over Finland, 20 seconds over Sweden, and 27 seconds over Norway, for which Therese Johaug, already a double gold medalist at these Olympics, was skiing the second leg. In the second leg, Natalya Nepryayeva of ROC and Katharina Hennig of Germany skied together, with about 25 second lead over a group of skiers, representing Norway, Sweden, Finland, the United States, and Switzerland, with others out of medal contention. At the second exchange, Germany were leading, with ROC 4 seconds behind, Norway 23 seconds behind, and Sweden and Finland 25 seconds behind. The same situation persisted for most of the third leg. Victoria Carl of Germany developed a 5 second lead over Tatiana Sorina of ROC. Norway and Finland were 14 and 18 seconds behind Germany, respectively, Sweden dropped to 35 seconds, with others out of medal contention. In the last leg, Jonna Sundling of Sweden, who earlier became the 2022 Olympic champion in the individual sprint, quickly caught up with her competitors from Norway and Finland. At 17.5 km, they were 20 seconds behind Sofie Krehl of Germany and Veronika Stepanova of ROC. Eventually, Stepanova escaped from Krehl, and Sundling won the bronze for Sweden over Krista Pärmäkoski. Norway with Ragnhild Haga finished fifth.

== Results ==
The race was started at 15:30.

Rank	Bib	Country	Time	Deficit
1st place, gold medalist(s)	2	ROC; Yuliya Stupak; Natalya Nepryayeva; Tatiana Sorina; Veronika Stepanova	53:41.0; 14:21.3; 14:06.4; 12:39.2; 12:34.1	
2nd place, silver medalist(s)	5	Germany; Katherine Sauerbrey; Katharina Hennig; Victoria Carl; Sofie Krehl	53:59.2; 14:22.8; 14:00.6; 12:38.5; 12:57.3	+18.2
3rd place, bronze medalist(s)	6	Sweden; Maja Dahlqvist; Ebba Andersson; Frida Karlsson; Jonna Sundling	54:01.7; 14:41.1; 14:07.3; 12:48.5; 12:24.8	+20.7
4	3	Finland; Anne Kyllönen; Johanna Matintalo; Kerttu Niskanen; Krista Pärmäkoski	54:02.2; 14:33.9; 14:15.0; 12:31.1; 12:42.2	+21.2
5	1	Norway; Tiril Udnes Weng; Therese Johaug; Helene Marie Fossesholm; Ragnhild Haga	54:09.8; 14:48.4; 13:57.8; 12:30.4; 12:53.2	+28.8
6	4	United States; Hailey Swirbul; Rosie Brennan; Novie McCabe; Jessie Diggins	55:09.2; 14:46.0; 14:13.8; 12:59.7; 13:09.7	+1:28.2
7	7	Switzerland; Laurien van der Graaff; Nadine Fähndrich; Nadja Kälin; Alina Meier	56:41.5; 14:45.2; 14:12.9; 13:38.5; 14:04.9	+3:00.5
8	18	Italy; Anna Comarella; Caterina Ganz; Martina Di Centa; Lucia Scardoni	57:20.5; 15:28.1; 15:11.4; 13:17.9; 13:23.1	+3:39.5
9	9	Canada; Katherine Stewart-Jones; Dahria Beatty; Cendrine Browne; Olivia Bouffard-Nesbitt	57:20.9; 15:04.5; 15:01.6; 13:17.0; 13:57.8	+3:39.9
10	16	China; Chi Chunxue; Li Xin; Jialin Bayani; Ma Qinghua	57:49.7; 15:02.9; 15:15.9; 13:39.5; 13:51.4	+4:08.7
11	10	Japan; Masako Ishida; Masae Tsuchiya; Chika Kobayashi; Miki Kodama	58:40.6; 14:33.6; 15:53.9; 13:59.8; 14:13.3	+4:59.6
12	17	France; Léna Quintin; Delphine Claudel; Flora Dolci; Mélissa Gal	59:03.9; 16:06.6; 15:23.8; 13:23.6; 14:09.9	+5:22.9
13	8	Czech Republic; Tereza Beranová; Petra Nováková; Kateřina Janatová; Petra Hynčicová	59:32.6; 17:08.7; 15:27.8; 13:14.6; 13:41.5	+5:51.6
14	12	Poland; Izabela Marcisz; Monika Skinder; Weronika Kaleta; Karolina Kukuczka	1:00:21.5; 15:24.8; 16:01.4; 14:24.8; 14:30.5	+6:40.5
15	11	Kazakhstan; Kseniya Shalygina; Angelina Shuryga; Nadezhda Stepashkina; Irina Bykova	1:01:15.4; 15:51.3; 16:00.4; 14:12.0; 15:11.7	+7:34.4
16	14	Estonia; Kaidy Kaasiku; Mariel Merlii Pulles; Keidy Kaasiku; Aveli Uustalu	1:01:18.9; 15:45.5; 15:38.9; 14:02.2; 15:52.3	+7:37.9
17	15	Latvia; Patrīcija Eiduka; Kitija Auziņa; Baiba Bendika; Samanta Krampe	1:01:20.6; 15:20.8; 16:11.0; 13:11.8; 16:37.0	+7:39.6
DSQ	13	Ukraine; Viktoriya Olekh; Valiantsina Kaminskaya; Maryna Antsybor; Darya Rublova	LAP; 17:55.5; LAP	
