= Yuliya Stupak =

Russian cross-country skier

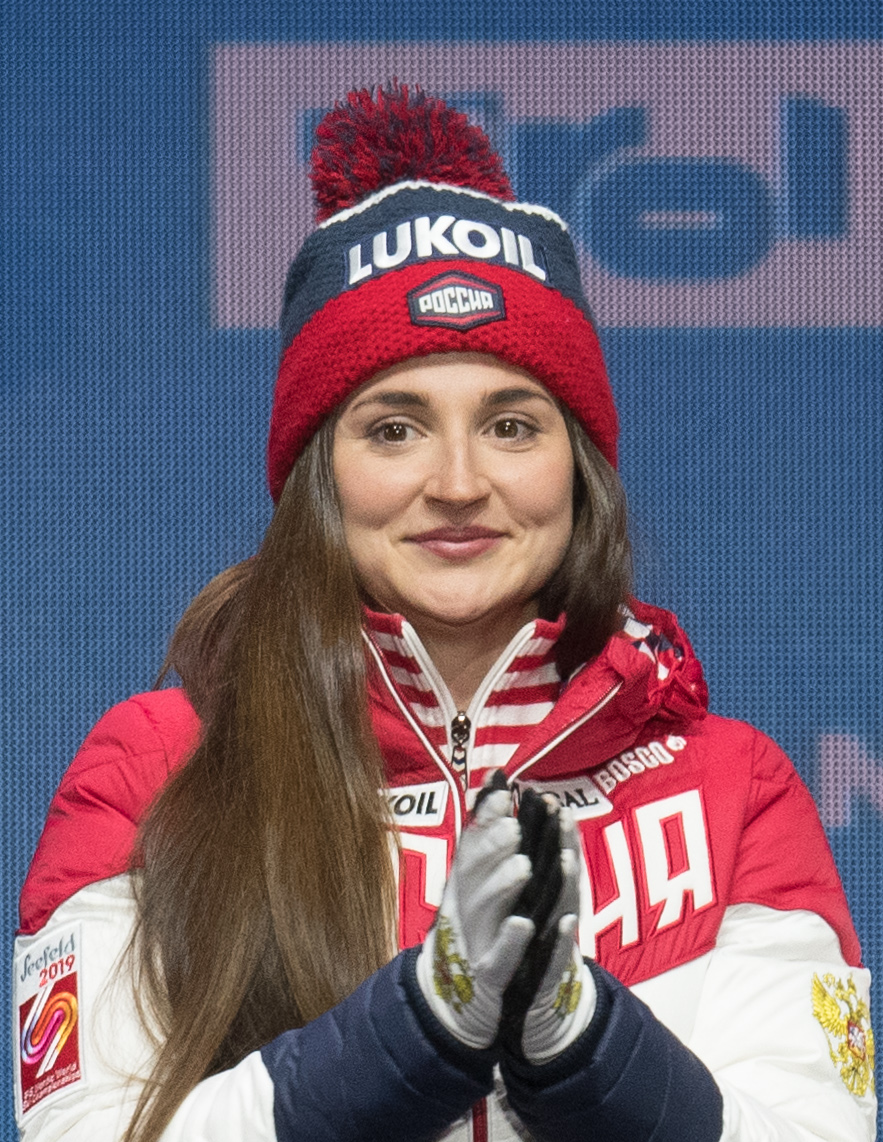
- Stupak in 2019

Personal information
- Nationality: Russia
- Born: Yuliya Belorukova; 21 January 1995 (age 31) Sosnogorsk, Komi, Russia
- Height: 1.67 m (5 ft 6 in)

Sport
- Sport: Skiing

World Cup career
- Seasons: 7 – (2014, 2016–2019, 2021–2022)
- Indiv. starts: 104
- Indiv. podiums: 9
- Indiv. wins: 3
- Team starts: 8
- Team podiums: 3
- Team wins: 2
- Overall titles: 0 – (2nd in 2021)
- Discipline titles: 0
Medal record
Women's cross-country skiing
International nordic ski competitions
Event	1st	2nd	3rd
Olympic Games	1	0	3
World Championships	0	2	1
Total	1	2	4
Women's cross-country skiing
Representing ROC
Olympic Games
Gold medal – first place	2022 Beijing	4 × 5 km relay
Bronze medal – third place	2022 Beijing	Team sprint
Representing Olympic Athletes from Russia
Olympic Games
Bronze medal – third place	2018 Pyeongchang	Individual sprint
Bronze medal – third place	2018 Pyeongchang	4 × 5 km relay
Representing Russian Ski Federation
World Championships
Silver medal – second place	2021 Oberstdorf	4 × 5 km relay
Representing Russia
World Championships
Silver medal – second place	2017 Lahti	Team sprint
Bronze medal – third place	2019 Seefeld	4 × 5 km relay
Junior World Championships
Silver medal – second place	2014 Val di Fiemme	4 × 3.33 km relay
Silver medal – second place	2015 Almaty	Individual sprint
Silver medal – second place	2015 Almaty	4 × 3.33 km relay
Bronze medal – third place	2014 Val di Fiemme	Individual sprint
- Updated on 23 March 2023

Yuliya Sergeyevna Stupak (Russian: Юлия Сергеевна Ступак, née Belorukova; born 21 January 1995) is a Russian cross-country skier who competes internationally with the Russian national team.

She competed at the FIS Nordic World Ski Championships 2017 in Lahti, Finland, 2018 Winter Olympics in Pyeongchang, South Korea, and FIS Nordic World Ski Championships 2019 in Seefeld, Austria.

== Cross-country skiing results ==
All results are sourced from the International Ski Federation (FIS).

=== Olympic Games ===
- 4 medals – (1 gold, 3 bronze)

Year	Age	10 km individual	15 km skiathlon	30 km mass start	Sprint	4 × 5 km relay	Team sprint
2018	23	—	18	—	Bronze	Bronze	9
2022	27	7	24	—	16	Gold	Bronze

=== World Championships ===
- 3 medals – (2 silver, 1 bronze)

Year	Age	10 km individual	15 km skiathlon	30 km mass start	Sprint	4 × 5 km relay	Team sprint
2017	22	—	—	—	10	5	Silver
2019	24	12	—	—	19	Bronze	4
2021	26	29	11	—	13	Silver	4

=== World Cup ===
==== Season standings ====
Season	Age	Discipline standings				Ski Tour standings			
Season	Age	Overall	Distance	Sprint	U23	Nordic Opening	Tour de Ski	World Cup Final	Ski Tour Canada
2014	19	108	NC	71	—N/a	—	—	—	—N/a
2016	21	39	34	44	5	31	—	—N/a	21
2017	22	32	52	18	2nd place, silver medalist(s)	20	—	22	—N/a
2018	23	29	39	19	5	14	—	29	—N/a
2019	24	8	8	12	—N/a	11	5	50	—N/a
2021	26	2nd place, silver medalist(s)	3rd place, bronze medalist(s)	16	—N/a	21	2nd place, silver medalist(s)	—N/a	—N/a
2022 (Note: On 1 March 2022, following the 2022 Russian invasion of Ukraine, FIS decided not to allow athletes from Russian and Belarus to take part in FIS competitions, with an immediate effect.)	27	33	26	32	—N/a	—N/a	DNF	—N/a	—N/a

==== Individual podiums ====
- 3 victories – (2 WC, 1 SWC)
- 9 podiums – (6 WC, 3 SWC)

No.	Season	Date	Location	Race	Level	Place
1	2017–18	24 November 2017	Rukatunturi, Finland	1.4 km Sprint C	Stage World Cup	3rd
2	2018–19	24 November 2018	Rukatunturi, Finland	1.4 km Sprint C	World Cup	1st
3	2020–21	13 December 2020	Davos, Switzerland	10 km Individual F	World Cup	2nd
4	2020–21	2 January 2021	Val Müstair, Switzerland	10 km Mass Start C	Stage World Cup	2nd
5	2020–21	6 January 2021	Toblach, Italy	10 km Pursuit C	Stage World Cup	1st
6	2020–21	1–10 January 2021	(Switzerland) (Italy) Tour de Ski	Overall Standings	World Cup	2nd
7	2020–21	30 January 2021	Falun, Sweden	10 km Mass Start C	World Cup	2nd
8	2020–21	13 March 2021	Engadin, Switzerland	10 km Mass Start C	World Cup	1st
9	2020–21	14 March 2021	Engadin, Switzerland	30 km Pursuit F	World Cup	3rd

==== Team podiums ====
- 2 victories – (1 RL, 1 TS)
- 3 podiums – (1 RL, 2 TS)

No.	Season	Date	Location	Race	Level	Place	Teammate(s)
1	2016–17	15 January 2017	Toblach, Italy	6 × 1.3 km Team Sprint F	World Cup	1st	Matveyeva
2	2020–21	20 December 2020	Dresden, Germany	12 × 0.65 km Team Sprint F	World Cup	2nd	Nepryayeva
3	2021–22	5 December 2021	Lillehammer, Norway	4 × 5 km Relay C/F	World Cup	1st	Nepryayeva / Sorina / Stepanova

== Personal life ==
Stupak is married to Nikita Stupak. Their child, Arseny, was born on 7 January 2020.
