= Cross-country skiing at the 2022 Winter Olympics =

Cross-country skiing at the XXIV Olympic Winter Games
- Cross-country skiing pictogram
- Venue: Kuyangshu Nordic Center and Biathlon Center
- Dates: 5–20 February 2022
- No. of events: 12 (6 men, 6 women)
- Competitors: 296 from 52 nations

Cross-country skiing at the 2022 Winter Olympics was held at the Kuyangshu Nordic Center and Biathlon Center in Zhangjiakou, China.

A total of 296 quota spots (148 per gender) were distributed to the sport, a decline of 14 from the 2018 Winter Olympics. A total of 12 events were contested, six each for men and women.

== Qualification ==
A maximum of 296 quota spots will be available to athletes to compete at the games. A maximum of 16 athletes can be entered by a National Olympic Committee, with a maximum of 8 men or 8 women. Nations that have an athlete achieve less than 300 FIS points in the 2021 World Championships, or the under 23 World Championships, gain entry for at least one competitor, of that gender, into the 2022 games.

== Competition schedule ==
The following was the competition schedule for all twelve events.

All times are (UTC+8).

Date	Time	Event
5 February	15:45	Women's skiathlon
6 February	15:00	Men's skiathlon
8 February	16:00	Men's & women's individual sprint freestyle
10 February	15:00	Women's 10 km classical
11 February	15:00	Men's 15 km classical
12 February	15:30	Women's 4 × 5 km relay
13 February	15:00	Men's 4 × 10 km relay
16 February	17:00	Women's and men's team sprint classical
19 February	15:00	Men's 50 km mass start freestyle
20 February	11:00	Women's 30 km mass start freestyle

== Medal summary ==
=== Medal table ===
Rank	Nation	Gold	Silver	Bronze	Total
1	Norway	5	1	2	8
2	ROC	4	4	3	11
3	Finland	1	2	3	6
4	Sweden	1	2	1	4
5	Germany	1	1	0	2
6	United States	0	1	1	2
7	Italy	0	1	0	1
8	Austria	0	0	1	1
8	France	0	0	1	1
Totals (9 entries)		12	12	12	36

=== Men's events ===
Event	Gold		Silver		Bronze	
15 kilometre classical	Iivo Niskanen; Finland	37:54.8	Alexander Bolshunov; ROC	38:18.0	Johannes Høsflot Klæbo; Norway	38:32.3
30 kilometre skiathlon	Alexander Bolshunov; ROC	1:16:09.8	Denis Spitsov; ROC	1:17:20.8	Iivo Niskanen; Finland	1:18:10.0
50 kilometre freestyle^{[a]}	Alexander Bolshunov; ROC	1:11:32.7	Ivan Yakimushkin; ROC	1:11:38.2	Simen Hegstad Krüger; Norway	1:11:39.7
4 × 10 kilometre relay	ROC; Aleksey Chervotkin; Alexander Bolshunov; Denis Spitsov; Sergey Ustiugov	1:54:50.7	Norway; Emil Iversen; Pål Golberg; Hans Christer Holund; Johannes Høsflot Klæbo	1:55:57.9	France; Richard Jouve; Hugo Lapalus; Clément Parisse; Maurice Manificat	1:56:07.1
Sprint freestyle	Johannes Høsflot Klæbo; Norway	2:58.06	Federico Pellegrino; Italy	2:58.32	Alexander Terentyev; ROC	2:59.37
Team sprint classical	Norway; Erik Valnes; Johannes Høsflot Klæbo	19:22.99	Finland; Iivo Niskanen; Joni Mäki	19:25.45	ROC; Alexander Bolshunov; Alexander Terentyev	19:27.28

^{a} This event was shortened to 28.4 km due to high winds and freezing temperatures.

=== Women's events ===
Event	Gold		Silver		Bronze	
10 kilometre classical	Therese Johaug; Norway	28:06.3	Kerttu Niskanen; Finland	28:06.7	Krista Pärmäkoski; Finland	28:37.8
15 kilometre skiathlon	Therese Johaug; Norway	44:13.7	Natalya Nepryayeva; ROC	44:43.9	Teresa Stadlober; Austria	44:44.2
30 kilometre freestyle	Therese Johaug; Norway	1:24:54.0	Jessie Diggins; United States	1:26:37.3	Kerttu Niskanen; Finland	1:27:27.3
4 × 5 kilometre relay	ROC; Yuliya Stupak; Natalya Nepryayeva; Tatiana Sorina; Veronika Stepanova	53:41.0	Germany; Katherine Sauerbrey; Katharina Hennig; Victoria Carl; Sofie Krehl	53:59.2	Sweden; Maja Dahlqvist; Ebba Andersson; Frida Karlsson; Jonna Sundling	54:01.7
Sprint freestyle	Jonna Sundling; Sweden	3:09.68	Maja Dahlqvist; Sweden	3:12.56	Jessie Diggins; United States	3:12.84
Team sprint classical	Germany; Katharina Hennig; Victoria Carl	22:09.85	Sweden; Maja Dahlqvist; Jonna Sundling	22:10.02	ROC; Yuliya Stupak; Natalya Nepryayeva	22:10.56

== Participating nations ==
A total of 296 athletes from 53 nations (including the ROC) were scheduled to participate, with the numbers of athletes are shown in parentheses.

- Andorra (2)
- Argentina (2)
- Armenia (3)
- Australia (6)
- Austria (5)
- Belarus (4)
- Belgium (1)
- Bolivia (1)
- Bosnia and Herzegovina (2)
- Brazil (3)
- Bulgaria (1)
- Canada (9)
- Chile (1)
- China (11)
- Colombia (1)
- Croatia (3)
- Czech Republic (11)
- Estonia (9)
- Finland (13)
- France (13)
- Germany (14)
- Great Britain (3)
- Greece (3)
- Hungary (2)
- Iceland (3)
- Ireland (1)
- Italy (12)
- Japan (9)
- Kazakhstan (7)
- Latvia (7)
- Lebanon (1)
- Liechtenstein (1)
- Lithuania (4)
- Mexico (1)
- Mongolia (2)
- Montenegro (1)
- Nigeria (1)
- North Macedonia (2)
- Norway (16)
- Poland (9)
- Portugal (1)
- ROC (16)
- Romania (3)
- Slovakia (5)
- Slovenia (10)
- South Korea (5)
- Spain (2)
- Sweden (16)
- Switzerland (14)
- Thailand (2)
- Turkey (3)
- Ukraine (7)
- United States (14)
