= Cross-country skiing at the 2022 Winter Olympics – Women's 15 kilometre skiathlon =

Women's 15 kilometre skiathlon at the XXIV Olympic Winter Games
- Cross-country skiing
- Venue: Kuyangshu Nordic Center and Biathlon Center, Zhangjiakou
- Date: 5 February 2022
- Competitors: 64 from 23 nations
- Winning time: 44:13.7

Medalists
1st place, gold medalist(s)		Therese Johaug	Norway
2nd place, silver medalist(s)		Natalya Nepryayeva	ROC
3rd place, bronze medalist(s)		Teresa Stadlober	Austria

The women's 15 kilometre skiathlon competition in cross-country skiing at the 2022 Winter Olympics was held on 5 February, at the Kuyangshu Nordic Center and Biathlon Center in Taizicheng. The event was won by Therese Johaug of Norway. The event was noted for its extreme weather, which many athletes complained. Temperature was −17 °C (1 °F) or −35 °C (−31 °F) with windchill, according to the International Ski Federation.

== Summary ==
The 2018 champion, Charlotte Kalla, qualified for the Olympics and was competing in the race, finishing 18th, and the 2018 silver medalist, Marit Bjørgen, retired from competitions. The bronze medalist, Krista Pärmäkoski, qualified. The overall leader of the 2021–22 FIS Cross-Country World Cup before the Olympics was Natalya Nepryayeva, and the distance leader was Frida Karlsson. Therese Johaug is the 2021 World Champion.

20 minutes into the race, the leading group consisted of Johaug, Kerttu Niskanen and Karlsson, skiing together, with Pärmäkoski, Ebba Andersson, Teresa Stadlober and Nepryayeva a few seconds behind. Then Pärmäkoski passed Andersson, with Johaug still in the lead. At 27 minutes, Johaug was 15 seconds ahead of the competitors, with Karlsson second, and Pärmäkoski and Niskanen further 6 seconds behind. Johaug continued to increase the gap and when she was 30 seconds ahead of the competitors, Nepryayeva and Stadlober overtaken Niskanen and Pärmäkoski, catching up with Karlsson. Pärmäkoski could not keep up with the rest of the group. Johaug comfortably finished first, 30 seconds ahead of Nepryayeva who outskied Stadlober at the finish line.

== Results ==
The race started at 15:45.

Rank	Bib	Name	Country	7.5 km classic	Rank	Pitstop	7.5 km free	Rank	Finish time	Deficit
1st place, gold medalist(s)	3	Therese Johaug	Norway	22:28.3	1	36.4	21:09.0	2	44:13.7	
2nd place, silver medalist(s)	1	Natalya Nepryayeva	ROC	22:42.3	7	37.0	21:24.6	5	44:43.9	+30.2
3rd place, bronze medalist(s)	11	Teresa Stadlober	Austria	22:38.7	5	45.7	21:19.8	4	44:44.2	+30.5
4	8	Kerttu Niskanen	Finland	22:31.0	2	34.7	21:44.1	7	44:49.8	+36.1
5	2	Frida Karlsson	Sweden	22:32.4	3	36.6	21:47.2	8	44:56.2	+42.5
6	6	Jessie Diggins	United States	23:26.4	11	36.0	21:01.8	1	45:04.2	+50.5
7	7	Krista Pärmäkoski	Finland	22:33.6	4	33.3	22:05.2	9	45:12.1	+58.4
8	20	Anastasia Rygalina	ROC	23:39.8	16	36.8	21:14.3	3	45:30.9	+1:17.2
9	12	Delphine Claudel	France	23:28.2	12	37.7	21:25.6	6	45:31.5	+1:17.8
10	4	Ebba Andersson	Sweden	22:40.5	6	36.5	22:24.3	11	45:41.3	+1:27.6
11	9	Tatiana Sorina	ROC	23:34.7	14	37.5	22:19.1	10	46:31.3	+2:17.6
12	17	Johanna Matintalo	Finland	23:12.9	9	34.0	22:49.6	16	46:36.5	+2:22.8
13	24	Katherine Sauerbrey	Germany	23:25.9	10	39.1	22:32.5	12	46:37.5	+2:23.8
14	10	Rosie Brennan	United States	23:32.0	13	44.6	22:48.8	15	47:05.4	+2:51.7
15	5	Katharina Hennig	Germany	23:12.4	8	44.0	23:15.4	23	47:11.8	+2:58.1
16	33	Izabela Marcisz	Poland	24:01.6	17	36.3	22:52.8	18	47:30.7	+3:17.0
17	41	Sofie Krehl	Germany	24:22.2	24	34.2	22:45.2	14	47:41.6	+3:27.9
18	13	Helene Marie Fossesholm	Norway	24:33.4	29	34.2	22:41.4	13	47:49.0	+3:35.3
19	18	Charlotte Kalla	Sweden	24:21.9	23	39.2	22:52.7	17	47:53.8	+3:40.1
20	40	Cendrine Browne	Canada	24:15.7	19	34.3	23:08.1	20	47:58.1	+3:44.4
21	32	Nadja Kälin	Switzerland	24:17.0	21	34.4	23:08.4	21	47:59.8	+3:46.1
22	21	Anne Kyllönen	Finland	24:14.9	18	39.8	23:15.3	22	48:10.0	+3:56.3
23	23	Katherine Stewart-Jones	Canada	24:16.4	20	38.2	23:22.7	25	48:17.3	+4:03.6
24	15	Yuliya Stupak	ROC	23:38.0	15	46.7	24:02.8	40	48:27.5	+4:13.8
25	22	Pia Fink	Germany	24:22.9	25	39.4	23:27.3	27	48:29.6	+4:15.9
26	49	Petra Hynčicová	Czech Republic	24:25.8	27	40.7	23:34.3	30	48:40.8	+4:27.1
27	25	Masako Ishida	Japan	24:26.3	28	37.3	23:41.1	35	48:44.7	+4:31.0
28	36	Dahria Beatty	Canada	24:40.1	34	37.2	23:34.7	31	48:52.0	+4:38.3
29	14	Ragnhild Haga	Norway	24:38.2	32	42.5	23:31.8	29	48:52.5	+4:38.8
30	34	Petra Nováková	Czech Republic	24:36.5	30	38.5	23:37.7	32	48:52.7	+4:39.0
31	53	Jessica Yeaton	Australia	25:08.1	42	47.0	22:58.9	19	48:54.0	+4:40.3
32	35	Lydia Hiernickel	Switzerland	25:06.6	41	36.9	23:15.5	24	48:59.0	+4:45.3
33	38	Li Xin	China	25:03.1	38	37.0	23:27.6	28	49:07.7	+4:54.0
34	28	Chi Chunxue	China	24:45.5	35	42.1	23:40.7	34	49:08.3	+4:54.6
35	39	Masae Tsuchiya	Japan	24:39.0	33	38.0	23:56.6	37	49:13.6	+4:59.9
36	47	Martina Di Centa	Italy	25:02.2	37	40.2	23:40.4	33	49:22.8	+5:09.1
37	27	Anna Comarella	Italy	24:24.1	26	44.7	24:19.0	44	49:27.8	+5:14.1
38	26	Coralie Bentz	France	25:05.8	40	42.7	23:45.9	36	49:34.4	+5:20.7
39	56	Keidy Kaasiku	Estonia	25:40.7	47	36.1	23:23.9	26	49:40.7	+5:27.0
40	19	Hailey Swirbul	United States	24:17.6	22	39.7	24:45.2	54	49:42.5	+5:28.8
41	45	Cristina Pittin	Italy	25:01.1	36	41.7	24:05.8	41	49:48.6	+5:34.9
42	46	Caterina Ganz	Italy	24:37.1	31	47.4	24:29.4	48	49:53.9	+5:40.2
43	29	Dinigeer Yilamujiang	China	25:26.8	45	42.2	24:01.7	39	50:10.7	+5:57.0
44	64	Olivia Bouffard-Nesbitt	Canada	25:27.3	46	32.7	24:11.7	42	50:11.7	+5:58.0
45	16	Moa Olsson	Sweden	25:05.0	39	36.6	24:31.2	49	50:12.8	+5:59.1
46	37	Jialin Bayani	China	25:41.2	48	38.7	24:00.3	38	50:20.2	+6:06.5
47	55	Carola Vila	Andorra	25:09.6	43	46.7	24:32.5	50	50:28.8	+6:15.1
48	51	Kseniya Shalygina	Kazakhstan	25:25.9	44	50.3	24:21.5	45	50:37.7	+6:24.0
49	50	Angelina Shuryga	Kazakhstan	26:05.6	50	36.5	24:13.2	43	50:55.3	+6:41.6
50	48	Chika Kobayashi	Japan	25:52.5	49	41.0	24:21.9	46	50:55.4	+6:41.7
51	42	Valeriya Tyuleneva	Kazakhstan	26:07.8	51	41.4	24:41.6	52	51:30.8	+7:17.1
52	43	Miki Kodama	Japan	26:17.4	52	45.9	24:45.0	53	51:48.3	+7:34.6
53	30	Julia Kern	United States	26:31.7	53	40.1	24:53.7	55	52:05.5	+7:51.8
54	54	Kaidy Kaasiku	Estonia	27:02.9	55	37.0	24:32.7	51	52:12.6	+7:58.9
55	62	Neža Žerjav	Slovenia	27:07.4	56	58.2	24:27.5	47	52:33.1	+8:19.4
56	44	Maryna Antsybor	Ukraine	27:08.4	57	37.3	25:08.3	56	52:54.0	+8:40.3
57	60	Nina Riedener	Liechtenstein	27:02.0	54	37.2	25:15.9	57	52:55.1	+8:41.4
58	59	Nadezhda Stepashkina	Kazakhstan	27:26.4	58	48.8	25:20.1	58	53:35.3	+9:21.6
59	61	Magdalena Kobielusz	Poland	27:32.7	59	53.5	25:45.8	59	54:12.0	+9:58.3
60	58	Viktoriya Olekh	Ukraine	28:26.8	62	41.6	25:47.3	60	54:55.7	+10:42.0
61	57	Lee Chae-won	South Korea	28:01.6	61	49.3	27:01.7	61	55:52.6	+11:38.9
62	52	Yuliya Krol	Ukraine	27:57.6	60	43.9	28:22.9	62	57:04.4	+12:50.7
	65	Darya Rublova	Ukraine	29:59.6	64	48.5	Lapped			
	63	Han Da-som	South Korea	29:52.3	63	Did not finish				
	31	Patrīcija Eiduka	Latvia	Did not start						
