= Cross-country skiing at the 2022 Winter Olympics – Women's sprint =

Women’s sprint at the XXIV Olympic Winter Games
- Cross-country skiing
- Venue: Kuyangshu Nordic Center and Biathlon Center, Zhangjiakou
- Date: 8 February 2022
- Competitors: 91 from 34 nations

Medalists
1st place, gold medalist(s)		Jonna Sundling	Sweden
2nd place, silver medalist(s)		Maja Dahlqvist	Sweden
3rd place, bronze medalist(s)		Jessie Diggins	United States

The women’s sprint competition in cross-country skiing at the 2022 Winter Olympics was held on 8 February, at the Kuyangshu Nordic Center and Biathlon Center in Zhangjiakou. Jonna Sundling of Sweden became the Olympic champion. Her compatriot, Maja Dahlqvist, won the silver medal, and Jessie Diggins of the United States the bronze. For Sundling and Dahlquist, this was the first Olympic medal, and for Diggins, the first individual Olympic medal.

== Summary ==
The 2018 champion, Stina Nilsson, switched to biathlon and was not available to defend her title. The silver medalist, Maiken Caspersen Falla, and the bronze medalist, Yuliya Stupak, qualified for the Olympics. The overall leader of the 2021–22 FIS Cross-Country World Cup before the Olympics was Natalya Nepryayeva, and the sprint leader was Dahlqvist. Sundling was the 2021 World Champion in individual sprint.

The medals for the competition were presented by Pál Schmitt, IOC Member, Olympian, and 1 Gold, 2 Gold, Hungary; and the medalists' bouquets were presented by Mats Årjes, FIG Council Member; Sweden.

== Results ==
=== Qualifying ===
The qualifying was held at 16:00.

Rank	Bib	Athlete	Country	Time	Deficit	Note
1	8	Jonna Sundling	Sweden	3:09.03		Q
2	6	Rosie Brennan	United States	3:14.83	+5.80	Q
3	20	Nadine Fähndrich	Switzerland	3:15.65	+6.62	Q
4	40	Yuliya Stupak	ROC	3:17.01	+7.98	Q
5	18	Jessie Diggins	United States	3:17.72	+8.69	Q
6	4	Maja Dahlqvist	Sweden	3:18.05	+9.02	Q
7	16	Tiril Udnes Weng	Norway	3:18.17	+9.14	Q
8	41	Sofie Krehl	Germany	3:18.93	+9.90	Q
9	10	Anna Dyvik	Sweden	3:19.15	+10.12	Q
10	39	Victoria Carl	Germany	3:19.89	+10.86	Q
11	2	Emma Ribom	Sweden	3:19.99	+10.96	Q
12	51	Veronika Stepanova	ROC	3:20.41	+11.38	Q
13	29	Jasmin Kähärä	Finland	3:20.43	+11.40	Q
14	30	Julia Kern	United States	3:20.69	+11.66	Q
15	46	Kateřina Janatová	Czech Republic	3:20.80	+11.77	Q
16	14	Maiken Caspersen Falla	Norway	3:20.86	+11.83	Q
17	33	Alina Meier	Switzerland	3:20.88	+11.85	Q
18	36	Jasmi Joensuu	Finland	3:21.05	+12.02	Q
19	22	Mathilde Myhrvold	Norway	3:21.24	+12.21	Q
20	12	Natalya Nepryayeva	ROC	3:21.76	+12.73	Q
21	25	Pia Fink	Germany	3:22.09	+13.06	Q
22	43	Tereza Beranová	Czech Republic	3:22.20	+13.17	Q
23	32	Lotta Udnes Weng	Norway	3:22.26	+13.23	Q
24	44	Katri Lylynperä	Finland	3:22.62	+13.59	Q
25	26	Greta Laurent	Italy	3:22.84	+13.81	Q
26	24	Anamarija Lampič	Slovenia	3:22.93	+13.90	Q
27	34	Laurien van der Graaff	Switzerland	3:23.03	+14.00	Q
28	11	Dahria Beatty	Canada	3:23.54	+14.51	Q
29	45	Lucia Scardoni	Italy	3:23.61	+14.58	Q
30	37	Caterina Ganz	Italy	3:24.13	+15.10	Q
31	42	Léna Quintin	France	3:24.19	+15.16	
32	31	Patrīcija Eiduka	Latvia	3:24.32	+15.29	
33	21	Petra Hynčicová	Czech Republic	3:24.51	+15.48	
34	27	Lisa Unterweger	Austria	3:24.83	+15.80	
35	50	Cendrine Browne	Canada	3:24.85	+15.82	
36	9	Ma Qinghua	China	3:25.05	+16.02	
37	38	Coletta Rydzek	Germany	3:25.09	+16.06	
38	13	Chi Chunxue	China	3:25.31	+16.28	
39	1	Izabela Marcisz	Poland	3:25.62	+16.59	
40	68	Olivia Bouffard-Nesbitt	Canada	3:25.92	+16.89	
41	48	Mariel Merlii Pulles	Estonia	3:27.71	+18.68	
42	17	Monika Skinder	Poland	3:27.93	+18.90	
43	19	Hannah Halvorsen	United States	3:29.13	+20.10	
44	15	Zuzana Holíková	Czech Republic	3:29.63	+20.60	
45	35	Hristina Matsokina	ROC	3:29.64	+20.61	
46	28	Eva Urevc	Slovenia	3:30.43	+21.40	
47	47	Cristina Pittin	Italy	3:30.64	+21.61	
48	52	Kaidy Kaasiku	Estonia	3:31.54	+22.51	
49	49	Anja Weber	Switzerland	3:31.60	+22.57	
50	3	Weronika Kaleta	Poland	3:32.28	+23.25	
51	64	Nadezhda Stepashkina	Kazakhstan	3:32.56	+23.53	
52	66	Jessica Yeaton	Australia	3:32.85	+23.82	
53	54	Vedrana Malec	Croatia	3:33.12	+24.09	
54	67	Maryna Antsybor	Ukraine	3:33.80	+24.77	
55	53	Anita Klemenčič	Slovenia	3:34.12	+25.09	
56	23	Dinigeer Yilamujiang	China	3:34.55	+25.52	
57	65	Barbora Klementová	Slovakia	3:34.87	+25.84	
58	61	Laura Leclair	Canada	3:35.31	+26.28	
59	57	Anja Mandeljc	Slovenia	3:35.90	+26.87	
60	62	Angelina Shuryga	Kazakhstan	3:35.93	+26.90	
61	70	Karen Chanloung	Thailand	3:36.00	+26.97	
62	55	Keidy Kaasiku	Estonia	3:36.82	+27.79	
63	5	Alena Procházková	Slovakia	3:36.84	+27.81	
64	59	Aveli Uustalu	Estonia	3:37.10	+28.07	
65	60	Casey Wright	Australia	3:39.22	+30.19	
66	7	Jialin Bayani	China	3:39.27	+30.24	
67	56	Kseniya Shalygina	Kazakhstan	3:41.55	+32.52	
68	58	Irina Bykova	Kazakhstan	3:42.70	+33.67	
69	69	Viktoriya Olekh	Ukraine	3:42.78	+33.75	
70	72	Tena Hadžić	Croatia	3:45.60	+36.57	
71	73	Kristína Sivoková	Slovakia	3:46.25	+37.22	
72	75	Samanta Krampe	Latvia	3:46.66	+37.63	
73	71	Kristrún Guðnadóttir	Iceland	3:49.59	+40.56	
74	79	Han Da-som	South Korea	3:51.34	+42.31	
75	74	Kitija Auziņa	Latvia	3:51.60	+42.57	
76	81	Lee Eui-jin	South Korea	3:52.05	+43.02	
77	77	Tímea Lőrincz	Romania	3:55.15	+46.12	
78	84	Ariunsanaagiin Enkhtuul	Mongolia	3:58.25	+49.22	
79	89	Katya Galstyan	Armenia	4:00.48	+51.45	
80	85	Estere Volfa	Latvia	4:03.36	+54.33	
81	78	Eglė Savickaitė	Lithuania	4:03.60	+54.57	
82	76	Nahiara Díaz	Argentina	4:05.46	+56.43	
83	87	Jaqueline Mourão	Brazil	4:05.60	+56.57	
84	80	Ayşenur Duman	Turkey	4:08.47	+59.44	
85	86	Ieva Dainytė	Lithuania	4:10.99	+1:01.96	
86	88	Nefeli Tita	Greece	4:14.48	+1:05.45	
87	90	Eduarda Ribera	Brazil	4:14.53	+1:05.50	
88	83	Maria Ntanou	Greece	4:19.66	+1:10.63	
89	91	Sanja Kusmuk	Bosnia and Herzegovina	4:27.99	+1:18.96	
DSQ	63	Valiantsina Kaminskaya	Ukraine	~~3:44.10~~	~~+35.07~~	
	82	Lee Chae-won	South Korea	Did not start		

=== Quarterfinals ===
Quarterfinal 1

Rank	Seed	Athlete	Country	Time	Deficit	Notes
1	1	Jonna Sundling	Sweden	3:15.48		Q
2	2	Rosie Brennan	United States	3:17.90	+2.42	Q
3	26	Anamarija Lampič	Slovenia	3:18.60	+3.12	LL
4	4	Yuliya Stupak	ROC	3:18.65	+3.17	
5	28	Dahria Beatty	Canada	3:18.73	+3.25	
6	30	Caterina Ganz	Italy	3:24.04	+8.56	

Quarterfinal 2

Rank	Seed	Athlete	Country	Time	Deficit	Notes
1	6	Maja Dahlqvist	Sweden	3:21.03		Q
2	7	Tiril Udnes Weng	Norway	3:21.31	+0.28	Q
3	20	Natalya Nepryayeva	ROC	3:21.34	+0.31	
4	22	Tereza Beranová	Czech Republic	3:22.59	+1.56	
5	27	Laurien van der Graaff	Switzerland	3:24.32	+3.29	
6	25	Greta Laurent	Italy	3:26.96	+5.93	

Quarterfinal 3

Rank	Seed	Athlete	Country	Time	Deficit	Notes
1	3	Nadine Fähndrich	Switzerland	3:16.51		Q
2	16	Maiken Caspersen Falla	Norway	3:16.88	+0.37	Q
3	10	Victoria Carl	Germany	3:18.26	+1.75	LL
4	9	Anna Dyvik	Sweden	3:19.00	+2.49	
5	24	Katri Lylynperä	Finland	3:24.29	+7.78	
6	29	Lucia Scardoni	Italy	3:27.07	+10.56	

Quarterfinal 4

Rank	Seed	Athlete	Country	Time	Deficit	Notes
1	5	Jessie Diggins	United States	3:16.30		Q
2	11	Emma Ribom	Sweden	3:18.44	+2.14	Q
3	21	Pia Fink	Germany	3:19.72	+3.42	
4	15	Kateřina Janatová	Czech Republic	3:20.12	+3.82	
5	23	Lotta Udnes Weng	Norway	3:21.21	+4.91	
6	18	Jasmi Joensuu	Finland	3:49.93	+33.63	

Quarterfinal 5

Rank	Seed	Athlete	Country	Time	Deficit	Notes
1	12	Veronika Stepanova	ROC	3:18.09		Q
2	8	Sofie Krehl	Germany	3:18.37	+0.28	Q
3	17	Alina Meier	Switzerland	3:21.12	+3.03	
4	14	Julia Kern	United States	3:21.68	+3.59	
5	19	Mathilde Myhrvold	Norway	3:24.62	+6.53	
6	13	Jasmin Kähärä	Finland	3:30.52	+12.43	

=== Semifinals ===
Semifinal 1

Rank	Seed	Athlete	Country	Time	Deficit	Notes
1	1	Jonna Sundling	Sweden	3:11.94		Q
2	3	Nadine Fähndrich	Switzerland	3:12.61	+0.67	Q
3	6	Maja Dahlqvist	Sweden	3:12.94	+1.00	LL
4	2	Rosie Brennan	United States	3:13.29	+1.35	LL
5	7	Tiril Udnes Weng	Norway	3:14.29	+2.35	
6	26	Anamarija Lampič	Slovenia	3:19.26	+7.32	

Semifinal 2

Rank	Seed	Athlete	Country	Time	Deficit	Notes
1	11	Emma Ribom	Sweden	3:15.22		Q
2	5	Jessie Diggins	United States	3:15.63	+0.41	Q
3	12	Veronika Stepanova	ROC	3:16.22	+1.00	
4	16	Maiken Caspersen Falla	Norway	3:16.41	+1.19	
5	10	Victoria Carl	Germany	3:16.83	+1.61	
6	8	Sofie Krehl	Germany	3:21.32	+6.10	

=== Final ===
The final was held at 19:59.

Rank	Seed	Athlete	Country	Time	Deficit	Notes
1st place, gold medalist(s)	1	Jonna Sundling	Sweden	3:09.68		
2nd place, silver medalist(s)	6	Maja Dahlqvist	Sweden	3:12.56	+2.88	
3rd place, bronze medalist(s)	5	Jessie Diggins	United States	3:12.84	+3.16	
4	2	Rosie Brennan	United States	3:14.17	+4.49	
5	3	Nadine Fähndrich	Switzerland	3:16.89	+7.21	
6	11	Emma Ribom	Sweden	3:20.79	+11.11	
