= Cross-country skiing at the 2022 Winter Olympics – Women's 10 kilometre classical =

Women's 10 kilometre classical at the XXIV Olympic Winter Games
- Cross-country skiing
- Venue: Kuyangshu Nordic Center and Biathlon Center, Zhangjiakou
- Date: 10 February 2022
- Competitors: 98 from 37 nations
- Winning time: 28:06.3

Medalists
1st place, gold medalist(s)		Therese Johaug	Norway
2nd place, silver medalist(s)		Kerttu Niskanen	Finland
3rd place, bronze medalist(s)		Krista Pärmäkoski	Finland

The women's 10 kilometre classical competition in cross-country skiing at the 2022 Winter Olympics was held on 10 February, at the Kuyangshu Nordic Center and Biathlon Center in Zhangjiakou. Therese Johaug of Norway became the Olympic champion, Kerttu Niskanen of Finland won the silver medal, and Krista Pärmäkoski, also of Finland, won bronze.

== Summary ==
The 10 km distance event alternates between the Olympics, and in 2018 it was the freestyle event. The 2018 champion, Ragnhild Haga, qualified for the Olympics, but was not selected for the event. The silver medalist, Charlotte Kalla, qualified. The bronze medal in 2018 was split between Marit Bjørgen and Krista Pärmäkoski. Bjørgen since retired from international competitions, while Pärmäkoski qualified for the 2022 Olympics. The overall leader of the 2021–22 FIS Cross-Country World Cup before the Olympics was Natalya Nepryayeva, and the distance leader was Frida Karlsson. Therese Johaug is the 2021 World Champion in 10 km freestyle.

The only skier able to offer any competition to Johaug was Kerttu Niskanen, who started 2 minutes behind Johaug and sometimes was leading, but at the finish lost by 0.4 seconds to Johaug and came in second. Pärmäkoski was third, 0.1 seconds ahead of late starter Nepryayeva.

== Results ==
The race was started at 15:00.

Rank	Bib	Name	Country	Time	Deficit
1st place, gold medalist(s)	36	Therese Johaug	Norway	28:06.3	
2nd place, silver medalist(s)	40	Kerttu Niskanen	Finland	28:06.7	+0.4
3rd place, bronze medalist(s)	38	Krista Pärmäkoski	Finland	28:37.8	+31.5
4	60	Natalya Nepryayeva	ROC	28:37.9	+31.6
5	32	Katharina Hennig	Germany	28:49.7	+43.4
6	56	Ebba Andersson	Sweden	28:57.2	+50.9
7	52	Yuliya Stupak	ROC	29:03.8	+57.5
8	34	Jessie Diggins	United States	29:15.1	+1:08.8
9	54	Teresa Stadlober	Austria	29:16.9	+1:10.6
10	42	Tatiana Sorina	ROC	29:17.4	+1:11.1
11	22	Katherine Sauerbrey	Germany	29:27.2	+1:20.9
12	58	Frida Karlsson	Sweden	29:28.0	+1:21.7
13	44	Rosie Brennan	United States	29:28.6	+1:22.3
14	50	Johanna Matintalo	Finland	29:31.2	+1:24.9
15	9	Liliya Vasilyeva	ROC	29:32.4	+1:26.1
16	28	Anne Kyllönen	Finland	29:42.6	+1:36.3
17	30	Anamarija Lampič	Slovenia	29:55.0	+1:48.7
18	10	Dahria Beatty	Canada	30:00.2	+1:53.9
19	26	Emma Ribom	Sweden	30:05.8	+1:59.5
20	48	Charlotte Kalla	Sweden	30:07.6	+2:01.3
21	46	Tiril Udnes Weng	Norway	30:22.6	+2:16.3
22	29	Nadine Fähndrich	Switzerland	30:23.8	+2:17.5
23	15	Patrīcija Eiduka	Latvia	30:34.7	+2:28.4
24	5	Novie McCabe	United States	30:34.9	+2:28.6
25	25	Lotta Udnes Weng	Norway	30:37.0	+2:30.7
26	19	Anna Comarella	Italy	30:45.0	+2:38.7
27	21	Masako Ishida	Japan	30:50.6	+2:44.3
28	8	Antonia Fräbel	Germany	30:51.4	+2:45.1
29	12	Izabela Marcisz	Poland	30:54.6	+2:48.3
30	11	Petra Nováková	Czech Republic	31:00.7	+2:54.4
31	59	Lisa Unterweger	Austria	31:02.1	+2:55.8
32	27	Hailey Swirbul	United States	31:05.3	+2:59.0
33	23	Laura Gimmler	Germany	31:05.6	+2:59.3
34	6	Kateřina Janatová	Czech Republic	31:07.2	+3:00.9
35	53	Caterina Ganz	Italy	31:08.1	+3:01.8
36	24	Katherine Stewart-Jones	Canada	31:08.6	+3:02.3
37	51	Martina Di Centa	Italy	31:08.8	+3:02.5
38	14	Lucia Scardoni	Italy	31:09.5	+3:03.2
39	18	Chi Chunxue	China	31:10.6	+3:04.3
40	20	Coralie Bentz	France	31:17.6	+3:11.3
41	37	Mélissa Gal	France	31:25.7	+3:19.4
42	47	Petra Hynčicová	Czech Republic	31:28.0	+3:21.7
43	13	Nadja Kälin	Switzerland	31:29.7	+3:23.4
44	39	Mathilde Myhrvold	Norway	31:36.0	+3:29.7
45	4	Li Xin	China	31:36.9	+3:30.6
46	3	Masae Tsuchiya	Japan	31:41.5	+3:35.2
47	31	Carola Vila	Andorra	31:45.0	+3:38.7
48	2	Cendrine Browne	Canada	31:47.9	+3:41.6
49	55	Monika Skinder	Poland	31:49.9	+3:43.6
50	64	Ma Qinghua	China	31:52.3	+3:46.0
51	35	Jessica Yeaton	Australia	31:54.6	+3:48.3
52	45	Angelina Shuryga	Kazakhstan	32:08.8	+4:02.5
53	43	Kseniya Shalygina	Kazakhstan	32:09.9	+4:03.6
54	49	Chika Kobayashi	Japan	32:10.0	+4:03.7
55	7	Anja Weber	Switzerland	32:13.4	+4:07.1
56	17	Dinigeer Yilamujiang	China	32:23.8	+4:17.5
57	71	Nadezhda Stepashkina	Kazakhstan	32:27.2	+4:20.9
58	57	Maryna Antsybor	Ukraine	32:36.5	+4:30.2
59	1	Valeriya Tyuleneva	Kazakhstan	32:52.1	+4:45.8
60	65	Keidy Kaasiku	Estonia	32:55.4	+4:49.1
61	79	Olivia Bouffard-Nesbitt	Canada	33:01.1	+4:54.8
62	67	Anita Klemenčič	Slovenia	33:09.3	+5:03.0
63	84	Karen Chanloung	Thailand	33:14.0	+5:07.7
64	81	Karolina Kukuczka	Poland	33:16.6	+5:10.3
65	16	Alena Procházková	Slovakia	33:18.2	+5:11.9
66	63	Anja Mandeljc	Slovenia	33:19.5	+5:13.2
67	80	Casey Wright	Australia	33:21.1	+5:14.8
68	73	Kitija Auziņa	Latvia	33:26.3	+5:20.0
69	75	Nina Riedener	Liechtenstein	33:49.0	+5:42.7
70	33	Kaidy Kaasiku	Estonia	33:50.7	+5:44.4
71	77	Neža Žerjav	Slovenia	33:56.8	+5:50.5
72	70	Lee Eui-jin	South Korea	34:07.9	+6:01.6
73	62	Vedrana Malec	Croatia	34:31.6	+6:25.3
74	87	Katya Galstyan	Armenia	34:37.5	+6:31.2
75	66	Lee Chae-won	South Korea	34:45.5	+6:39.2
76	68	Viktoriya Olekh	Ukraine	34:58.1	+6:51.8
77	82	Barbora Klementová	Slovakia	34:59.2	+6:52.9
78	76	Magdalena Kobielusz	Poland	35:40.3	+7:34.0
79	69	Aveli Uustalu	Estonia	35:46.2	+7:39.9
80	88	Kristína Sivoková	Slovakia	36:12.6	+8:06.3
81	91	Jaqueline Mourão	Brazil	36:14.6	+8:08.3
82	74	Tena Hadžić	Croatia	36:27.5	+8:21.2
83	92	Estere Volfa	Latvia	36:36.9	+8:30.6
84	96	Ariunsanaagiin Enkhtuul	Mongolia	37:02.5	+8:56.2
85	61	Tímea Lőrincz	Romania	37:15.3	+9:09.0
86	78	Ayşenur Duman	Turkey	37:36.7	+9:30.4
87	72	Maria Ntanou	Greece	37:39.4	+9:33.1
88	94	Eglė Savickaitė	Lithuania	38:26.5	+10:20.2
89	93	Eduarda Ribera	Brazil	38:58.7	+10:52.4
90	98	Ieva Dainytė	Lithuania	39:07.4	+11:01.1
91	85	Özlem Ceren Dursun	Turkey	39:17.6	+11:11.3
92	89	Samanta Krampe	Latvia	39:34.2	+11:27.9
93	95	Angelina Muradyan	Armenia	39:43.4	+11:37.1
94	90	Ana Cvetanovska	North Macedonia	39:57.7	+11:51.4
95	86	Nahiara Díaz	Argentina	40:30.8	+12:24.5
96	97	Sára Pónya	Hungary	41:13.6	+13:07.3
97	83	Nefeli Tita	Greece	42:12.1	+14:05.8
DSQ	41	Valiantsina Kaminskaya	Ukraine	~~35:42.7~~	~~+7:36.4~~
