= Cross-country skiing at the 2022 Winter Olympics – Women's team sprint =

Women’s team sprint at the XXIV Olympic Winter Games
- Cross-country skiing
- Venue: Kuyangshu Nordic Center and Biathlon Center, Zhangjiakou
- Date: 16 February 2022
- Competitors: 52 from 26 nations
- Teams: 26
- Winning time: 22:09.85

Medalists
1st place, gold medalist(s)		Katharina Hennig; Victoria Carl	Germany
2nd place, silver medalist(s)		Maja Dahlqvist; Jonna Sundling	Sweden
3rd place, bronze medalist(s)		Yuliya Stupak; Natalya Nepryayeva	ROC

The women’s team sprint competition in cross-country skiing at the 2022 Winter Olympics was held on 16 February, at the Kuyangshu Nordic Center and Biathlon Center in Zhangjiakou. Katharina Hennig and Victoria Carl of Germany won the event. Maja Dahlqvist and Jonna Sundling of Sweden won silver medals, and Yuliya Stupak and Natalya Nepryayeva, representing the Russian Olympic Committee, bronze.

== Summary ==
The defending champions are Kikkan Randall and Jessie Diggins. Diggins qualified, Randall has since retired. The silver medalists were Charlotte Kalla and Stina Nilsson. Kalla qualified for the Olympics but did not participate in the team sprint, and Nilsson switched to biathlon. The 2018 bronze medalists were Marit Bjørgen, who retired from competitions, and Maiken Caspersen Falla, who qualified. The overall leader of the 2021–22 FIS Cross-Country World Cup before the Olympics was Natalya Nepryayeva, and the sprint leader was Maja Dahlqvist. Jonna Sundling and Dahlqvist won the only team sprint event of the season. They are also the 2021 World Champions in team sprint and previously finished 1–2 in the individual sprint at the 2022 Olympics.

In the final, five teams, Sweden, Finland, Germany, the United States, and the Russian Olympic Committee, were skiing together, and at the last interchange were within 4 seconds from each other.

== Results ==
=== Semifinals ===
Rank	Heat	Bib	Country	Athletes	Time	Notes
1	1	4	Germany	Katharina Hennig; Victoria Carl	23:02.08	Q
2	1	1	United States	Rosie Brennan; Jessie Diggins	23:06.11	Q
3	1	5	Austria	Teresa Stadlober; Lisa Unterweger	23:08.34	Q
4	1	2	Switzerland	Laurien van der Graaff; Nadine Fähndrich	23:30.86	Q
5	1	7	China	Chi Chunxue; Li Xin	23:43.93	
6	1	6	Canada	Katherine Stewart-Jones; Dahria Beatty	24:03.72	
7	1	3	Slovenia	Eva Urevc; Anamarija Lampič	24:10.14	
8	1	11	Australia	Jessica Yeaton; Casey Wright	25:13.42	
9	1	8	Ukraine	Yuliya Krol; Maryna Antsybor	25:46.04	
10	1	10	Croatia	Tena Hadžić; Vedrana Malec	26:29.23	
11	1	13	Latvia	Kitija Auziņa; Estere Volfa	26:46.26	
12	1	12	Turkey	Ayşenur Duman; Özlem Ceren Dursun	Lapped	
	1	9	Belarus	Anastasia Kirillova; Hanna Karaliova	Did not start	
1	2	14	ROC	Yuliya Stupak; Natalya Nepryayeva	23:00.47	Q
2	2	16	Finland	Kerttu Niskanen; Krista Pärmäkoski	23:00.82	Q
3	2	15	Sweden	Maja Dahlqvist; Jonna Sundling	23:01.40	Q
4	2	17	Norway	Tiril Udnes Weng; Maiken Caspersen Falla	23:05.06	Q
5	2	21	France	Mélissa Gal; Léna Quintin	23:26.28	LL
6	2	20	Poland	Izabela Marcisz; Monika Skinder	23:32.34	LL
7	2	19	Italy	Caterina Ganz; Lucia Scardoni	23:47.06	
8	2	18	Czech Republic	Kateřina Janatová; Petra Hynčicová	23:55.59	
9	2	23	Estonia	Mariel Merlii Pulles; Keidy Kaasiku	24:47.51	
10	2	22	Kazakhstan	Nadezhda Stepashkina; Kseniya Shalygina	24:57.59	
11	2	24	South Korea	Han Da-som; Lee Eui-jin	26:55.52	
12	2	26	Brazil	Jaqueline Mourão; Eduarda Ribera	Lapped	
13	2	25	Greece	Maria Ntanou; Nefeli Tita	Lapped	
14	2	27	Lithuania	Eglė Savickaitė; Ieva Dainytė	Lapped	

=== Final ===
Rank	Bib	Country	Athletes	Time	Deficit
1st place, gold medalist(s)	4	Germany	Katharina Hennig; Victoria Carl	22:09.85	—
2nd place, silver medalist(s)	15	Sweden	Maja Dahlqvist; Jonna Sundling	22:10.02	+0.17
3rd place, bronze medalist(s)	14	ROC	Yuliya Stupak; Natalya Nepryayeva	22:10.56	+0.71
4	16	Finland	Kerttu Niskanen; Krista Pärmäkoski	22:13.71	+3.86
5	1	United States	Rosie Brennan; Jessie Diggins	22:22.78	+12.93
6	5	Austria	Teresa Stadlober; Lisa Unterweger	22:55.25	+45.40
7	2	Switzerland	Laurien van der Graaff; Nadine Fähndrich	23:02.09	+52.24
8	17	Norway	Tiril Udnes Weng; Maiken Caspersen Falla	23:15.28	+1:05.43
9	20	Poland	Izabela Marcisz; Monika Skinder	23:48.01	+1:38.16
10	21	France	Mélissa Gal; Léna Quintin	24:04.92	+1:55.07
