= 2021 Tour de Ski =

15th edition of skiing event in Europe

Tour de Ski
2020–21 FIS Cross-Country World Cup

Ski tour details
- Venue(s): Val Müstair, Switzerland; Toblach, Italy; Val di Fiemme, Italy
- Dates: 1 January 2021 – 10 January 2021
- Stages: 8

Results
Men
| Jersey awarded to the men's overall winner | Winner | Alexander Bolshunov (RUS) |
| | Second | Maurice Manificat (FRA) |
| | Third | Denis Spitsov (RUS) |
| Jersey awarded to the men's points classification winner | Points | Alexander Bolshunov (RUS) |
Women
| Jersey awarded to the women's overall winner | Winner | Jessie Diggins (USA) |
| | Second | Yuliya Stupak (RUS) |
| | Third | Ebba Andersson (SWE) |
| Jersey awarded to the women's points classification winner | Points | Linn Svahn (SWE) |

The 2021 Tour de Ski was the 15th edition of the Tour de Ski and part of the 2020–21 FIS Cross-Country World Cup. The World Cup stage event began in Val Müstair, Switzerland on 1 January 2021 and conclude with the Final Climb stage in Val di Fiemme, Italy, on 10 January 2021. The tour was the second edition starting in Val Müstair. The last stage known as the Final Climb was held as a mass start for the second time. Alexander Bolshunov from Russia and Therese Johaug from Norway were the title defenders. However, Johaug and other athletes from Norway decided to skip the Tour de Ski with concerns about competing and travelling during coronavirus pandemic.

Bolshunov defended his title on this year's Tour de Ski, finishing in the overall standings with a three-minute margin from the runner-up. Jessie Diggins won her first Tour de Ski cup; her best result prior to that was third, which she reached at the 2017–18 Tour de Ski. She became the first American to win the Tour de Ski.

== Schedule ==
| Stage | Venue | Date | Event | Technique | Distance | | Start time (CET) | |
| Stage | Venue | Date | Event | Technique | Women | Men | Women | Men |
|---|---|---|---|---|---|---|---|---|
| 1 | Val Müstair (SUI) | 1 January 2021 | Sprint | Freestyle | 1.4 km | 1.4 km | 11:45 | 11:45 |
| 2 | Val Müstair (SUI) | 2 January 2021 | Distance, mass start | Classic | 10 km | 15 km | 12:30 | 14:45 |
| 3 | Val Müstair (SUI) | 3 January 2021 | Distance, pursuit | Freestyle | 10 km | 15 km | 15:25 | 11:35 |
| 4 | Toblach (ITA) | 5 January 2021 | Distance, interval start | Freestyle | 10 km | 15 km | 13:00 | 14:45 |
| 5 | Toblach (ITA) | 6 January 2021 | Distance, pursuit | Classic | 10 km | 15 km | 13:30 | 14:40 |
| 6 | Val di Fiemme (ITA) | 8 January 2021 | Distance, mass start | Classic | 10 km | 15 km | 15:35 | 13:15 |
| 7 | Val di Fiemme (ITA) | 9 January 2021 | Sprint | Classic | 1.3 km | 1.5 km | 13:05 | 13:05 |
| 8 | Val di Fiemme (ITA) | 10 January 2021 | Final Climb, mass start | Freestyle | 10 km | 10 km | 12:45 | 15:35 |

== Overall leadership ==
Two main individual classifications were contested in the 2023-2024 Tour de Ski, as well as a team competition. The most important is the overall standings, calculated by adding each skier's finishing times on each stage. Time bonuses (time subtracted) were awarded at both sprint stages and at intermediate points during mass start stage 6. In the sprint stages, the winners were awarded 60 bonus seconds, while on mass start stage 6 the first ten skiers past the intermediate point received from 15 seconds to 1 seconds. The skier with the lowest cumulative time was the overall winner of the Tour de Ski. For the second time in Tour history, the skier leading the overall standings wore a yellow bib.

Bonus seconds for the top 30 positions by type
| Type | | 1 | 2 | 3 | 4 | 5 | 6 | 7 | 8 | 9 | 10 | 11 | 12 | 13–15 | 16–20 | 21–25 | 26–30 |
|---|---|---|---|---|---|---|---|---|---|---|---|---|---|---|---|---|---|
| In finish | Interval start | none | | | | | | | | | | | | | | | |
| In finish | Mass start | none | | | | | | | | | | | | | | | |
| In finish | Pursuit | none | | | | | | | | | | | | | | | |
| In finish | Sprint | 60 | 54 | 48 | 46 | 44 | 42 | 32 | 30 | 28 | 26 | 24 | 22 | 10 | 8 | 6 | 4 |
| Intermediate sprint | Mass Start (only stage 6) | 15 | 12 | 10 | 8 | 6 | 5 | 4 | 3 | 2 | 1 | none | | | | | |

The second competition is the points standings, which replaced the sprint competition from past editions. The skiers who will receive the highest number of points during the Tour will win the points standings. The points available for each stage finish are determined by the stage's type. The leader will be identified by a red bib.

Points standings points for the top 10 positions by type
| Type | | 1 | 2 | 3 | 4 | 5 | 6 | 7 | 8 | 9 | 10 |
In finish
| In finish | Sprint | 30 | 24 | 20 | 16 | 12 | 10 | 8 | 6 | 4 | 2 |
| In finish | Pursuit | 15 | 12 | 10 | 8 | 6 | 5 | 4 | 3 | 2 | 1 |
| Intermediate sprint | Interval start (1st IT) | 15 | 12 | 10 | 8 | 6 | 5 | 4 | 3 | 2 | 1 |
| Intermediate sprint | Mass start | 15 | 12 | 10 | 8 | 6 | 5 | 4 | 3 | 2 | 1 |

The final competition is a team competition. This is calculated using the finishing times of the best two skiers of both genders per team on each stage; the leading team is the team with the lowest cumulative time.

Classification leadership by stage
| Stage | Men | | | Women | | |
| Stage | Winner | Overall standings | Points standings | Winner | Overall standings | Points standings |
|---|---|---|---|---|---|---|
| 1 | (Italy) Federico Pellegrino | (Italy) Federico Pellegrino | (Italy) Federico Pellegrino | (Sweden) Linn Svahn | (Sweden) Linn Svahn | (Sweden) Linn Svahn |
| 2 | (Russia) Alexander Bolshunov | (Russia) Alexander Bolshunov | (Italy) Federico Pellegrino | (Sweden) Linn Svahn | (Sweden) Linn Svahn | (Sweden) Linn Svahn |
| 3 | (Russia) Alexander Bolshunov | (Russia) Alexander Bolshunov | (Italy) Federico Pellegrino | (United States) Jessie Diggins | (United States) Jessie Diggins | (Sweden) Linn Svahn |
| 4 | (Russia) Alexander Bolshunov | (Russia) Alexander Bolshunov | (Russia) Alexander Bolshunov | (United States) Jessie Diggins | (United States) Jessie Diggins | (United States) Jessie Diggins |
| 5 | (Russia) Alexander Bolshunov | (Russia) Alexander Bolshunov | (Russia) Alexander Bolshunov | (Russia) Yuliya Stupak | (United States) Jessie Diggins | (United States) Jessie Diggins |
| 6 | (Russia) Alexander Bolshunov | (Russia) Alexander Bolshunov | (Russia) Alexander Bolshunov | (Russia) Natalya Nepryayeva | (United States) Jessie Diggins | (United States) Jessie Diggins |
| 7 | (Sweden) Oskar Svensson | (Russia) Alexander Bolshunov | (Russia) Alexander Bolshunov | (Sweden) Linn Svahn | (United States) Jessie Diggins | (Sweden) Linn Svahn |
| 8 | (Russia) Denis Spitsov | (Russia) Alexander Bolshunov | (Russia) Alexander Bolshunov | (Sweden) Ebba Andersson | (United States) Jessie Diggins | (Sweden) Linn Svahn |
| Final | | (Russia) Alexander Bolshunov | (Russia) Alexander Bolshunov | Final | (United States) Jessie Diggins | (Sweden) Linn Svahn |

== Final standings ==
Legend
| Denotes the winner of the Overall standings | Denotes the winner of the Points standings |

=== Overall standings ===
==== Men ====
Final Overall standings (1–10)
| Rank | Name | Time |
|---|---|---|
| 1 | Alexander Bolshunov (RUS) | 3:32:32.3 |
| 2 | Maurice Manificat (FRA) | +3:23.9 |
| 3 | Denis Spitsov (RUS) | +3:36.7 |
| 4 | Ivan Yakimushkin (RUS) | +3:40.6 |
| 5 | Artem Maltsev (RUS) | +4:03.3 |
| 6 | Evgeniy Belov (RUS) | +5:08.5 |
| 7 | Andrey Melnichenko (RUS) | +5:23.7 |
| 8 | Dario Cologna (SUI) | +6:04.6 |
| 9 | Clément Parisse (FRA) | +6:12.4 |
| 10 | Hugo Lapalus (FRA) | +6:22.9 |

Final Overall standings (11–51)
| Rank | Name | Time |
|---|---|---|
| 11 | Ilia Semikov (RUS) | +7:36.2 |
| 12 | Lucas Bögl (GER) | +7:49.6 |
| 13 | Adrien Backscheider (FRA) | +7:50.6 |
| 14 | Federico Pellegrino (ITA) | +8:13.2 |
| 15 | Francesco De Fabiani (ITA) | +8:22.9 |
| 16 | Oskar Svensson (SWE) | +8:25.1 |
| 17 | Aleksey Chervotkin (RUS) | +8:25.8 |
| 18 | Gus Schumacher (USA) | +8:36.1 |
| 19 | Florian Notz (GER) | +9:04.8 |
| 20 | Jules Lapierre (FRA) | +9:17.5 |
| 21 | Jonas Dobler (GER) | +9:26.6 |
| 22 | Irineu Esteve Altimiras (AND) | +9:31.8 |
| 23 | William Poromaa (SWE) | +9:54.0 |
| 24 | Michal Novák (CZE) | +10:10.0 |
| 25 | Alexander Terentyev (RUS) | +10:22.2 |
| 26 | Beda Klee (SUI) | +10:38.3 |
| 27 | Markus Vuorela (FIN) | +10:45.0 |
| 28 | Jonas Baumann (SUI) | +11:05.2 |
| 29 | Roman Furger (SUI) | +11:13.6 |
| 30 | Janosch Brugger (GER) | +11:14.9 |
| 31 | Imanol Rojo (ESP) | +11:26.2 |
| 32 | Paolo Ventura (ITA) | +11:28.3 |
| 33 | Björn Sandström (SWE) | +12:04.6 |
| 34 | Candide Pralong (SUI) | +12:33.7 |
| 35 | Giandomenico Salvadori (ITA) | +13:19.7 |
| 36 | Thomas Bing (GER) | +13:20.3 |
| 37 | Scott Patterson (USA) | +13:57.7 |
| 38 | Thomas Hjalmar Westgård (IRL) | +13:59.8 |
| 39 | Juho Mikkonen (FIN) | +14:52.4 |
| 40 | Mika Vermeulen (AUT) | +14:59.1 |
| 41 | Snorri Eythor Einarsson (ISL) | +15:16.7 |
| 42 | Mirco Bertolina (ITA) | +15:37.3 |
| 43 | Valentin Chauvin (FRA) | +16:22.5 |
| 44 | Marcus Ruus (SWE) | +16:50.6 |
| 45 | Richard Jouve (FRA) | +17:30.6 |
| 46 | Gleb Retivykh (RUS) | +17:42.3 |
| 47 | Adam Fellner (CZE) | +17:50.2 |
| 48 | Kevin Bolger (USA) | +19:17.6 |
| 49 | Petr Knop (CZE) | +21:43.3 |
| 50 | Lauri Lepistö (FIN) | +22:40.0 |
| 51 | Verneri Suhonen (FIN) | +29:09.7 |

==== Women ====
Final Overall standings (1–10)
| Rank | Name | Time |
|---|---|---|
| 1 | Jessie Diggins (USA) | 3:04:45.8 |
| 2 | Yuliya Stupak (RUS) | +1:24.8 |
| 3 | Ebba Andersson (SWE) | +2:00.8 |
| 4 | Tatiana Sorina (RUS) | +2:58.1 |
| 5 | Krista Pärmäkoski (FIN) | +3:23.0 |
| 6 | Rosie Brennan (USA) | +3:27.6 |
| 7 | Natalya Nepryayeva (RUS) | +3:28.5 |
| 8 | Katharina Hennig (GER) | +3:41.4 |
| 9 | Teresa Stadlober (AUT) | +5:10.8 |
| 10 | Kateřina Razýmová (CZE) | +5:21.2 |

Final Overall standings (11–41)
| Rank | Name | Time |
|---|---|---|
| 11 | Nadine Fähndrich (SUI) | +5:36.7 |
| 12 | Alisa Zhambalova (RUS) | +5:41.7 |
| 13 | Yana Kirpichenko (RUS) | +6:15.9 |
| 14 | Linn Svahn (SWE) | +6:38.0 |
| 15 | Anamarija Lampič (SLO) | +6:49.4 |
| 16 | Delphine Claudel (FRA) | +7:04.4 |
| 17 | Johanna Matintalo (FIN) | +7:15.2 |
| 18 | Hailey Swirbul (USA) | +7:35.6 |
| 19 | Maja Dahlqvist (SWE) | +7:47.0 |
| 20 | Anna Comarella (ITA) | +8:51.5 |
| 21 | Emma Ribom (SWE) | +9:46.9 |
| 22 | Anna Nechaevskaya (RUS) | +9:51.4 |
| 23 | Katharine Ogden (USA) | +9:53.3 |
| 24 | Patrīcija Eiduka (LAT) | +10:07.0 |
| 25 | Jonna Sundling (SWE) | +10:07.3 |
| 26 | Antonia Fräbel (GER) | +11:06.8 |
| 27 | Pia Fink (GER) | +11:14.8 |
| 28 | Hristina Matsokina (RUS) | +11:26.3 |
| 29 | Izabela Marcisz (POL) | +11:44.3 |
| 30 | Moa Lundgren (SWE) | +11:55.4 |
| 31 | Lucia Scardoni (ITA) | +12:33.8 |
| 32 | Franchesca Franchi (ITA) | +12:36.6 |
| 33 | Julia Preussger (GER) | +13:20.3 |
| 34 | Caitlin Patterson (USA) | +13:26.7 |
| 35 | Laurien van der Graaff (SUI) | +15:03.8 |
| 36 | Moa Olsson (SWE) | +15:11.4 |
| 37 | Martina di Centa (ITA) | +16:37.6 |
| 38 | Julia Kern (USA) | +16:48.1 |
| 39 | Kateřina Janatová (CZE) | +17:11.0 |
| 40 | Petra Hynčicová (CZE) | +17:45.4 |
| 41 | Ilaria Debertolis (ITA) | +18:52.3 |

=== Points standings ===
==== Men ====
Final Points standings (1–10)
| Rank | Name | Points |
|---|---|---|
| 1 | Alexander Bolshunov (RUS) | 101 |
| 2 | Gleb Retivykh (RUS) | 90 |
| 3 | Federico Pellegrino (ITA) | 71 |
| 4 | Richard Jouve (FRA) | 42 |
| 5 | Artem Maltsev (RUS) | 38 |
| 6 | Oskar Svensson (SWE) | 32 |
| 7 | Andrey Melnichenko (RUS) | 24 |
| 8 | Maurice Manificat (FRA) | 20 |
| 9 | Evgeniy Belov (RUS) | 20 |
| 10 | Jules Lapierre (FRA) | 20 |

==== Women ====
Final Points standings (1–10)
| Rank | Name | Points |
|---|---|---|
| 1 | Linn Svahn (SWE) | 83 |
| 2 | Jessie Diggins (USA) | 74 |
| 3 | Anamarija Lampič (SLO) | 51 |
| 4 | Ebba Andersson (SWE) | 50 |
| 5 | Maja Dahlqvist (SWE) | 43 |
| 6 | Natalya Nepryayeva (RUS) | 38 |
| 7 | Tatiana Sorina (RUS) | 30 |
| 8 | Yuliya Stupak (RUS) | 28 |
| 9 | Rosie Brennan (USA) | 27 |
| 10 | Emma Ribom (SWE) | 26 |

=== Team standings ===
Final Team standings (1–5)
| Rank | Nation | Time |
|---|---|---|
| 1 | Russia | 13:17:31.8 |
| 2 | Sweden | +14:26.2 |
| 3 | United States | +21:23.8 |
| 4 | Germany | +24:50.8 |
| 5 | Italy | +30:18.0 |

== Stages ==
=== Stage 1 ===
1 January 2021, Val Müstair, Switzerland

- Bonus seconds to the 30 skiers that qualifies for the quarter-finals, distributed as following:
  - Final: 60–54–48–46–44–42
  - Semi-final: 32–30–28–26–24–22
  - Quarter-final: 10–10–10–8–8–8–8–8–6–6–6–6–6–4–4–4–4–4

Men – 1.4 km Sprint Freestyle
| Rank | Name | QT | Time | BS |
|---|---|---|---|---|
| 1 | Federico Pellegrino (ITA) | 3:02.19 (1) | 3:08.44 | 60 |
| 2 | Alexander Bolshunov (RUS) | 3:04.53 (2) | +0.57 | 54 |
| 3 | Richard Jouve (FRA) | 3:06.67 (7) | +2.53 | 48 |
| 4 | Gleb Retivykh (RUS) | 3:07.98 (13) | +4.33 | 46 |
| 5 | Artem Maltsev (RUS) | 3:04.81 (3) | +4.82 | 44 |
| 6 | Lucas Chanavat (FRA) | 3:07.46 (10) | +28.28 | 42 |
| 7 | Valentin Chauvin (FRA) | 3:08.07 (14) | SF | 32 |
| 8 | Alexander Terentyev (RUS) | 3:07.25 (8) | SF | 30 |
| 9 | Michal Novák (CZE) | 3:07.95 (12) | SF | 28 |
| 10 | Oskar Svensson (SWE) | 3:09.48 (19) | SF | 26 |

Women – 1.4 km Sprint Freestyle
| Rank | Name | QT | Time | BS |
|---|---|---|---|---|
| 1 | Linn Svahn (SWE) | 3:33.70 (2) | 3:32.01 | 60 |
| 2 | Anamarija Lampič (SLO) | 3:35.60 (6) | +0.54 | 54 |
| 3 | Jessie Diggins (USA) | 3:39.82 (14) | +3.41 | 48 |
| 4 | Frida Karlsson (SWE) | 3:37.23 (8) | +5.83 | 46 |
| 5 | Rosie Brennan (USA) | 3:35.24 (5) | +8.00 | 44 |
| 6 | Nadine Fähndrich (SUI) | 3:35.11 (3) | +1:02.00 | 42 |
| 7 | Maja Dahlqvist (SWE) | 3:30.86 (1) | SF | 32 |
| 8 | Natalya Nepryayeva (RUS) | 3:43.53 (26) | SF | 30 |
| 9 | Tatiana Sorina (RUS) | 3:36.00 (7) | SF | 28 |
| 10 | Jonna Sundling (SWE) | 3:38.59 (11) | SF | 26 |

=== Stage 2 ===
2 January 2021, Val Müstair, Switzerland

- No bonus seconds were awarded on this stage.

Men – 15 km Classic (mass start)
| Rank | Name | Time |
|---|---|---|
| 1 | Alexander Bolshunov (RUS) | 34:09.8 |
| 2 | Dario Cologna (SUI) | +23.5 |
| 3 | Ivan Yakimushkin (RUS) | +25.3 |
| 4 | Maurice Manificat (FRA) | +27.7 |
| 5 | Denis Spitsov (RUS) | +34.4 |
| 6 | Oskar Svensson (SWE) | +36.3 |
| 7 | Ilia Semikov (RUS) | +43.4 |
| 8 | Evgeniy Belov (RUS) | +47.2 |
| 9 | Irineu Esteve Altimiras (AND) | +47.3 |
| 10 | Clément Parisse (FRA) | +47.7 |

Women – 10 km Classic (mass start)
| Rank | Name | Time |
|---|---|---|
| 1 | Linn Svahn (SWE) | 30:09.9 |
| 2 | Yuliya Stupak (RUS) | +0.7 |
| 3 | Jessie Diggins (USA) | +0.8 |
| 4 | Frida Karlsson (SWE) | +1.4 |
| 5 | Katharina Hennig (GER) | +2.0 |
| 6 | Rosie Brennan (USA) | +3.4 |
| 7 | Yana Kirpichenko (RUS) | +4.5 |
| 8 | Alisa Zhambalova (RUS) | +13.6 |
| 9 | Krista Pärmäkoski (FIN) | +13.6 |
| 10 | Tatiana Sorina (RUS) | +17.9 |

=== Stage 3 ===
3 January 2021, Val Müstair, Switzerland

- Pursuit start lists are based on Tour de Ski overall standings after two stages.
- No bonus seconds were awarded on this stage.

Men – 15 km Freestyle (pursuit)
| Rank | Name | Time |
|---|---|---|
| 1 | Alexander Bolshunov (RUS) | 32:11.1 |
| 2 | Artem Maltsev (RUS) | +53.7 |
| 3 | Maurice Manificat (FRA) | +1:07.0 |
| 4 | Denis Spitsov (RUS) | +1:10.7 |
| 5 | Ivan Yakimushkin (RUS) | +1:34.2 |
| 6 | Dario Cologna (SUI) | +1:34.7 |
| 7 | Clément Parisse (FRA) | +1:48.8 |
| 8 | Federico Pellegrino (ITA) | +2:08.3 |
| 9 | Jean-Marc Gaillard (FRA) | +2:13.9 |
| 10 | Adrien Backscheider (FRA) | +2:14.1 |

Women – 10 km Freestyle (pursuit)
| Rank | Name | Time |
|---|---|---|
| 1 | Jessie Diggins (USA) | 26:54.1 |
| 2 | Rosie Brennan (USA) | +5.6 |
| 3 | Frida Karlsson (SWE) | +10.7 |
| 4 | Anamarija Lampič (SLO) | +57.9 |
| 5 | Yuliya Stupak (RUS) | +59.4 |
| 6 | Linn Svahn (SWE) | +1:12.9 |
| 7 | Tatiana Sorina (RUS) | +1:15.5 |
| 8 | Nadine Fähndrich (SUI) | +1:28.3 |
| 9 | Katharina Hennig (GER) | +1:28.7 |
| 10 | Krista Pärmäkoski (FIN) | +1:31.4 |

=== Stage 4 ===
5 January 2021, Toblach, Italy

- No bonus seconds are awarded on this stage.

Men – 15 km Freestyle (individual) Free
| Rank | Name | Time |
|---|---|---|
| 1 | Alexander Bolshunov (RUS) | 32:49.6 |
| 2 | Denis Spitsov (RUS) | +8.3 |
| 3 | Ivan Yakimushkin (RUS) | +13.9 |
| 4 | Aleksey Chervotkin (RUS) | +19.2 |
| 5 | Artem Maltsev (RUS) | +21.8 |
| 6 | Maurice Manificat (FRA) | +22.9 |
| 7 | Evgeniy Belov (RUS) | +27.6 |
| 8 | Andrey Melnichenko (RUS) | +29.2 |
| 9 | Hugo Lapalus (FRA) | +29.9 |
| 10 | Janosch Brugger (GER) | +43.9 |

Women – 10 km Freestyle (individual)
| Rank | Name | Time |
|---|---|---|
| 1 | Jessie Diggins (USA) | 25:14.5 |
| 2 | Rosie Brennan (USA) | +14.8 |
| 3 | Ebba Andersson (SWE) | +22.2 |
| 4 | Yuliya Stupak (RUS) | +25.7 |
| 5 | Krista Pärmäkoski (FIN) | +31.3 |
| 6 | Tatiana Sorina (RUS) | +35.6 |
| 7 | Delphine Claudel (FRA) | +48.3 |
| 8 | Teresa Stadlober (AUT) | +51.8 |
| 9 | Frida Karlsson (SWE) | +52.4 |
| 10 | Alisa Zhambalova (RUS) | +56.9 |

=== Stage 5 ===
6 January 2021, Toblach, Italy

- Pursuit start lists are based only on Stage 4 results (not as in the past on the current Tour de Ski overall standings). In fact, stage 5 finish differences are cumulative results of stages 4 and 5
- No bonus seconds are awarded on this stage.

Men – 15 km Classic (individual)
| Rank | Name | Time |
|---|---|---|
| 1 | Alexander Bolshunov (RUS) | 34:32.9 |
| 2 | Ivan Yakimushkin (RUS) | +55.5 |
| 3 | Evgeniy Belov (RUS) | +55.6 |
| 4 | Aleksey Chervotkin (RUS) | +56.8 |
| 5 | Andrey Melnichenko (RUS) | +58.7 |
| 6 | Maurice Manificat (FRA) | +1:01.4 |
| 7 | Denis Spitsov (RUS) | +1:04.2 |
| 8 | Artem Maltsev (RUS) | +1:12.1 |
| 9 | Ilia Semikov (RUS) | +2:02.5 |
| 10 | Lucas Bögl (GER) | +2:02.5 |

Women – 10 km Classic (individual)
| Rank | Name | Time |
|---|---|---|
| 1 | Yuliya Stupak (RUS) | 29:24.7 |
| 2 | Ebba Andersson (SWE) | +0.7 |
| 3 | Jessie Diggins (USA) | +0.8 |
| 4 | Rosie Brennan (USA) | +17.3 |
| 5 | Krista Pärmäkoski (FIN) | +37.3 |
| 6 | Tatiana Sorina (RUS) | +38.3 |
| 7 | Alisa Zhambalova (RUS) | +58.5 |
| 8 | Katharina Hennig (GER) | +58.5 |
| 9 | Kateřina Razýmová (CZE) | +59.3 |
| 10 | Natalya Nepryayeva (RUS) | +1:01.7 |

=== Stage 6 ===
8 January 2021, Val di Fiemme, Italy

Men – 15 km Classic (mass start)
| Rank | Name | Time | BS |
|---|---|---|---|
| 1 | Alexander Bolshunov (RUS) | 41:33.7 | 15 |
| 2 | Francesco De Fabiani (ITA) | +1.8 | 10 |
| 3 | Aleksey Chervotkin (RUS) | +3.7 | |
| 4 | Ilia Semikov (RUS) | +6.7 | |
| 5 | Ivan Yakimushkin (RUS) | +7.6 | 6 |
| 6 | Janosch Brugger (GER) | +7.6 | |
| 7 | Andrey Melnichenko (RUS) | +9.6 | 4 |
| 8 | Gus Schumacher (USA) | +11.4 | |
| 9 | Thomas Hjalmar Westgård (IRL) | +14.3 | |
| 10 | Maurice Manificat (FRA) | +14.9 | 2 |

Women – 10 km Classic (mass start)
| Rank | Name | Time | BS |
|---|---|---|---|
| 1 | Natalya Nepryayeva (RUS) | 30:35.5 | 4 |
| 2 | Katharina Hennig (GER) | +2.4 | 10 |
| 3 | Ebba Andersson (SWE) | +4.1 | 15 |
| 4 | Teresa Stadlober (AUT) | +6.6 | 1 |
| 5 | Johanna Matintalo (FIN) | +7.2 | |
| 6 | Krista Pärmäkoski (FIN) | +9.9 | |
| 7 | Alisa Zhambalova (RUS) | +13.7 | 3 |
| 8 | Yuliya Stupak (RUS) | +15.1 | 6 |
| 9 | Jessie Diggins (USA) | +24.0 | 12 |
| 10 | Yana Kirpichenko (RUS) | +27.3 | |

==== Stage 6 bonus seconds ====
- Men: 1 intermediate sprint, bonus seconds to the 10 first skiers (15–12–10–8–6–5–4–3–2–1) past the intermediate point.
- Women: 1 intermediate sprint, bonus seconds to the 10 first skiers (15–12–10–8–6–5–4–3–2–1) past the intermediate point.
- No bonus seconds are awarded at the finish

Bonus seconds (Stage 6 – Men)
| Name | Point 1 |
|---|---|
| Alexander Bolshunov (RUS) | 15 |
| Denis Spitsov (RUS) | 12 |
| Francesco De Fabiani (ITA) | 10 |
| Artem Maltsev (RUS) | 8 |
| Ivan Yakimushkin (RUS) | 6 |
| Dario Cologna (SUI) | 5 |
| Andrey Melnichenko (RUS) | 4 |
| Roman Furger (SUI) | 3 |
| Maurice Manificat (FRA) | 2 |
| Markus Vuorela (FIN) | 1 |

Bonus seconds (Stage 6 – Women)
| Name | Point 1 |
|---|---|
| Ebba Andersson (SWE) | 15 |
| Jessie Diggins (USA) | 12 |
| Katharina Hennig (GER) | 10 |
| Tatiana Sorina (RUS) | 8 |
| Yuliya Stupak (RUS) | 6 |
| Frida Karlsson (SWE) | 5 |
| Natalya Nepryayeva (RUS) | 4 |
| Alisa Zhambalova (RUS) | 3 |
| Linn Svahn (SWE) | 2 |
| Teresa Stadlober (AUT) | 1 |

=== Stage 7 ===
9 January 2021, Val di Fiemme, Italy

- Bonus seconds to the 30 skiers that qualifies for the quarter-finals, distributed as following:
  - Final: 60–54–48–46–44–42
  - Semi-final: 32–30–28–26–24–22
  - Quarter-final: 10–10–10–8–8–8–8–8–6–6–6–6–6–4–4–4–4–4

Men – 1.5 km Sprint Classic
| Rank | Name | QT | Time | BS |
|---|---|---|---|---|
| 1 | Oskar Svensson (SWE) | 3:19.40 (8) | 3:19.83 | 60 |
| 2 | Gleb Retivykh (RUS) | 3:18.08 (6) | +0.24 | 54 |
| 3 | Alexander Bolshunov (RUS) | 3:17.79 (4) | +0.32 | 48 |
| 4 | Federico Pellegrino (ITA) | 3:14.48 (1) | +0.70 | 46 |
| 5 | Valentin Chauvin (FRA) | 3:16.88 (3) | +0.76 | 44 |
| 6 | Artem Maltsev (RUS) | 3:21.96 (15) | +3.15 | 42 |
| 7 | Markus Vuorela (FIN) | 3:19.42 (9) | SF | 32 |
| 8 | Janosch Brugger (GER) | 3:23.98 (19) | SF | 30 |
| 9 | Alexander Terentyev (RUS) | 3:16.27 (2) | SF | 28 |
| 10 | Ilia Semikov (RUS) | 3:20.83 (12) | SF | 26 |

Women – 1.3 km Sprint Classic
| Rank | Name | QT | Time | BS |
|---|---|---|---|---|
| 1 | Linn Svahn (SWE) | 3:11.98 (1) | 3:14.69 | 60 |
| 2 | Maja Dahlqvist (SWE) | 3:14.38 (6) | +0.54 | 54 |
| 3 | Emma Ribom (SWE) | 3:16.32 (11) | +0.84 | 48 |
| 4 | Natalya Nepryayeva (RUS) | 3:14.27 (5) | +1.60 | 46 |
| 5 | Tatiana Sorina (RUS) | 3:13.22 (2) | +1.97 | 44 |
| 6 | Krista Pärmäkoski (FIN) | 3:16.38 (12) | +2.42 | 42 |
| 7 | Jonna Sundling (SWE) | 3:14.53 (7) | SF | 32 |
| 8 | Yuliya Stupak (RUS) | 3:18.57 (16) | SF | 30 |
| 9 | Anamarija Lampič (SLO) | 3:13.29 (3) | SF | 28 |
| 10 | Jessie Diggins (USA) | 3:15.40 (8) | SF | 26 |

=== Stage 8 ===
10 January 2021, Val di Fiemme, Italy

The race for "Fastest of the Day" counts for 2020–21 FIS Cross-Country World Cup points. No bonus seconds are awarded on this stage.

Men – 10 km Final Climb Freestyle (mass start)
| Rank | Name | Time |
|---|---|---|
| 1 | Denis Spitsov (RUS) | 32:41.0 |
| 2 | Alexander Bolshunov (RUS) | +13.3 |
| 3 | Maurice Manificat (FRA) | +15.2 |
| 4 | Evgeniy Belov (RUS) | +21.8 |
| 5 | Andrey Melnichenko (RUS) | +24.0 |
| 6 | Ivan Yakimushkin (RUS) | +26.9 |
| 7 | Hugo Lapalus (FRA) | +30.2 |
| 8 | Lucas Bögl (GER) | +37.9 |
| 9 | Adrien Backscheider (FRA) | +39.9 |
| 10 | Clément Parisse (FRA) | +42.7 |

Women – 10 km Final Climb Freestyle (mass start)
| Rank | Name | Time |
|---|---|---|
| 1 | Ebba Andersson (SWE) | 36:45.6 |
| 2 | Jessie Diggins (USA) | +9.2 |
| 3 | Delphine Claudel (FRA) | +32.6 |
| 4 | Yuliya Stupak (RUS) | +40.0 |
| 5 | Tatiana Sorina (RUS) | +1:04.3 |
| 6 | Kateřina Razýmová (CZE) | +1:17.4 |
| 7 | Rosie Brennan (USA) | +1:17.8 |
| 8 | Katharina Hennig (GER) | +1:23.6 |
| 9 | Anna Nechaevskaya (RUS) | +1:27.6 |
| 10 | Patrīcija Eiduka (LAT) | +1:29.2 |

== World Cup points distribution ==
The table shows the number of 2020–21 FIS Cross-Country World Cup points to win in the 2021 Tour de Ski for men and women.

| Place | 1 | 2 | 3 | 4 | 5 | 6 | 7 | 8 | 9 | 10 | 11 | 12 | 13 | 14 | 15 | 16 | 17 | 18 | 19 | 20 | 21 | 22 | 23 | 24 | 25 | 26 | 27 | 28 | 29 | 30 | 31 - 40 | >40 |
| Overall Standings | 400 | 320 | 240 | 200 | 180 | 160 | 144 | 128 | 116 | 104 | 96 | 88 | 80 | 72 | 64 | 60 | 56 | 52 | 48 | 44 | 40 | 36 | 32 | 28 | 24 | 20 | 20 | 20 | 20 | 20 | 10 | 5 |
| Each Stage | 50 | 46 | 43 | 40 | 37 | 34 | 32 | 30 | 28 | 26 | 24 | 22 | 20 | 18 | 16 | 15 | 14 | 13 | 12 | 11 | 10 | 9 | 8 | 7 | 6 | 5 | 4 | 3 | 2 | 1 |

== Sources ==
- Rules for the FIS Cross-Country World Cup (PDF). International Ski Federation (FIS). 2020.
- COOP FIS CROSS-COUNTRY WORLD CUP 2020/21 (PDF). International Ski Federation (FIS). 2020. Archived from the original (PDF) on 31 October 2020.
