= 2020–21 FIS Cross-Country World Cup =

Cross-country skiing competition

Discipline	Men	Women
Overall	(Russia) Alexander Bolshunov (2)	(United States) Jessie Diggins (1)
Distance	(Russia) Alexander Bolshunov (3)	(United States) Jessie Diggins (1)
Sprint	(Italy) Federico Pellegrino (2)	(Slovenia) Anamarija Lampič (1)
U-23	(France) Hugo Lapalus (2)	(Sweden) Linn Svahn (1)
Bonus Ranking	(Russia) Alexander Bolshunov (1)	(Sweden) Linn Svahn (1)
Nations Cup	Russia (3)	Sweden (1)
- Nations Cup Overall: Russia (3)

Stage events
Nordic Opening	(Norway) Johannes Høsflot Klæbo (3)	(Norway) Therese Johaug (4)
Tour de Ski	(Russia) Alexander Bolshunov (2)	(United States) Jessie Diggins (1)

Competition
Locations	10 venues	10 venues
Individual	21 events	21 events
Relay/Team	3 events	3 events

The 2020–21 FIS Cross-Country World Cup was the 40th official World Cup season in cross-country skiing for men and women.

The season began with the Nordic Opening stage event on 27–29 November 2020 in Ruka, Finland and was planned to conclude with the World Cup Finals on 19–21 March 2021 in Beijing, China. However, due to the COVID-19 pandemic, FIS announced on 4 December 2020 that all events in China, including the Cross-Country World Cup final were cancelled. World Cup Finals were moved to Lillehammer, where December competitions couldn't be arranged. However, on 12 February 2021, all the events scheduled in Oslo and Lillehammer were cancelled due to ongoing pandemic. The World Cup Final stage event was called off this year and the season ended on 13–14 March in Engadin, Switzerland, where the final pursuit races made a replacement for cancelled 30/50 kilometers annual competition in Oslo. The pandemic also reduced participation, after the opening in Ruka the Norwegian, Swedish and Finnish teams announced that they would not compete in Davos and Dresden as they felt that they could not guarantee a safe environment. Later, Norway announced they would also not participate in Tour de Ski.

== Calendar ==
=== Men ===
Key: C – Classic / F – Freestyle
WC	Stage	Date	Place	Discipline	Winner	Second	Third	Yellow bib	Ref.
	1	27 November 2020	(Finland) Ruka	Sprint C	(Norway) Erik Valnes	(Norway) Johannes Høsflot Klæbo	(Norway) Emil Iversen	(Norway) Erik Valnes	
	2	28 November 2020	(Finland) Ruka	15 km C	(Norway) Johannes Høsflot Klæbo	(Russia) Aleksey Chervotkin	(Russia) Alexander Bolshunov	(Norway) Johannes Høsflot Klæbo	
	3	29 November 2020	(Finland) Ruka	15 km F Pursuit	(Norway) Hans Christer Holund	(Russia) Andrey Melnichenko	(Norway) Sjur Røthe	(Norway) Emil Iversen	
1	11th Nordic Opening Overall (27–29 November 2020)				(Norway) Johannes Høsflot Klæbo	(Russia) Alexander Bolshunov	(Norway) Emil Iversen	(Norway) Johannes Høsflot Klæbo	
		4 December 2020	(Norway) Lillehammer	Sprint C	Cancelled due to the COVID-19 pandemic.				
		5 December 2020	(Norway) Lillehammer	30 km Skiathlon	Cancelled due to the COVID-19 pandemic.				
		6 December 2020	(Norway) Lillehammer	4 × 7.5 km Relay C/F	Cancelled due to the COVID-19 pandemic.				
2	4	12 December 2020	(Switzerland) Davos	Sprint F	(Italy) Federico Pellegrino	(Russia) Alexander Bolshunov	(United Kingdom) Andrew Young	(Russia) Alexander Bolshunov	
3	5	13 December 2020	(Switzerland) Davos	15 km F	(Russia) Alexander Bolshunov	(Russia) Andrey Melnichenko	(Russia) Artem Maltsev	(Russia) Alexander Bolshunov	
4	6	19 December 2020	(Germany) Dresden	Sprint F	(Italy) Federico Pellegrino	(United Kingdom) Andrew Young	(Russia) Gleb Retivykh	(Russia) Alexander Bolshunov	
		20 December 2020	(Germany) Dresden	Team Sprint F	Russia I Alexander Bolshunov; Gleb Retivykh	France I Richard Jouve; Lucas Chanavat	Italy I Francesco de Fabiani; Federico Pellegrino	(Russia) Alexander Bolshunov	
	7	1 January 2021	(Switzerland) Val Müstair	Sprint F	(Italy) Federico Pellegrino	(Russia) Alexander Bolshunov	(France) Richard Jouve	(Russia) Alexander Bolshunov	
	8	2 January 2021	(Switzerland) Val Müstair	15 km C Mass Start	(Russia) Alexander Bolshunov	(Switzerland) Dario Cologna	(Russia) Ivan Yakimushkin	(Russia) Alexander Bolshunov	
	9	3 January 2021	(Switzerland) Val Müstair	15 km F Pursuit	(Russia) Alexander Bolshunov	(Russia) Artem Maltsev	(France) Maurice Manificat	(Russia) Alexander Bolshunov	
	10	5 January 2021	(Italy) Toblach	15 km F	(Russia) Alexander Bolshunov	(Russia) Denis Spitsov	(Russia) Ivan Yakimushkin	(Russia) Alexander Bolshunov	
	11	6 January 2021	(Italy) Toblach	15 km C Pursuit	(Russia) Alexander Bolshunov	(Russia) Ivan Yakimushkin	(Russia) Evgeniy Belov	(Russia) Alexander Bolshunov	
	12	8 January 2021	(Italy) Val di Fiemme	15 km C Mass Start	(Russia) Alexander Bolshunov	(Italy) Francesco De Fabiani	(Russia) Aleksey Chervotkin	(Russia) Alexander Bolshunov	
	13	9 January 2021	(Italy) Val di Fiemme	Sprint C	(Sweden) Oskar Svensson	(Russia) Gleb Retivykh	(Russia) Alexander Bolshunov	(Russia) Alexander Bolshunov	
	14	10 January 2021	(Italy) Val di Fiemme	10 km F Mass Start Climb	(Russia) Denis Spitsov	(Russia) Alexander Bolshunov	(France) Maurice Manificat	(Russia) Alexander Bolshunov	
5	15th Tour de Ski Overall (1–10 January 2021)				(Russia) Alexander Bolshunov	(France) Maurice Manificat	(Russia) Denis Spitsov	(Russia) Alexander Bolshunov	
6	15	23 January 2021	(Finland) Lahti	30 km Skiathlon	(Norway) Emil Iversen	(Norway) Sjur Røthe	(Norway) Pål Golberg	(Russia) Alexander Bolshunov	
		24 January 2021	(Finland) Lahti	4 × 7.5 km Relay C/F	Norway Pål Golberg; Emil Iversen; Sjur Røthe; Simen Hegstad Krüger	Finland I Perttu Hyvärinen; Ristomatti Hakola; Iivo Niskanen; Joni Mäki	Russia II Ilia Semikov; Ivan Yakimushkin; Andrey Melnichenko; Sergey Ustiugov	(Russia) Alexander Bolshunov	
7	16	29 January 2021	(Sweden) Falun	15 km F	(Russia) Alexander Bolshunov	(Norway) Simen Hegstad Krüger	(Norway) Sjur Røthe	(Russia) Alexander Bolshunov	
8	17	30 January 2021	(Sweden) Falun	15 km C Mass Start	(Russia) Alexander Bolshunov	(Norway) Johannes Høsflot Klæbo	(Norway) Pål Golberg	(Russia) Alexander Bolshunov	
9	18	31 January 2021	(Sweden) Falun	Sprint C	(Norway) Johannes Høsflot Klæbo	(Sweden) Oskar Svensson	(Norway) Håvard Solås Taugbøl	(Russia) Alexander Bolshunov	
10	19	6 February 2021	(Sweden) Ulricehamn	Sprint F	(Sweden) Oskar Svensson	(Russia) Gleb Retivykh	(Italy) Federico Pellegrino	(Russia) Alexander Bolshunov	
		7 February 2021	(Sweden) Ulricehamn	Team Sprint F	Italy I Francesco de Fabiani; Federico Pellegrino	Switzerland I Jovian Hediger; Roman Furger	Sweden II Karl-Johan Westberg; Johan Häggström	(Russia) Alexander Bolshunov	
		20 February 2021	(Czech Republic) Nové Město	Sprint C	Cancelled due to the COVID-19 pandemic.				
		21 February 2021	(Czech Republic) Nové Město	15 km F	Cancelled due to the COVID-19 pandemic.				
FIS Nordic World Ski Championships 2021 (23 February–7 March)
11	20	13 March 2021	(Switzerland) Engadin	15 km C Mass Start	(Russia) Alexander Bolshunov	(Norway) Johannes Høsflot Klæbo	(Norway) Pål Golberg	(Russia) Alexander Bolshunov	
12	21	14 March 2021	(Switzerland) Engadin	50 km F Pursuit	(Norway) Simen Hegstad Krüger	(Norway) Hans Christer Holund	(Sweden) Jens Burman	(Russia) Alexander Bolshunov	
		19 March 2021	(China) Beijing	Sprint F	Cancelled due to the COVID-19 pandemic.				
		20 March 2021	(China) Beijing	15 km Skiathlon	Cancelled due to the COVID-19 pandemic.				
		21 March 2021	(China) Beijing	15 km C Pursuit	Cancelled due to the COVID-19 pandemic.				
	2020–21 World Cup Finals Overall (19–21 March 2021)				Cancelled due to the COVID-19 pandemic.				

=== Women ===
Key: C – Classic / F – Freestyle
WC	Stage	Date	Place	Discipline	Winner	Second	Third	Yellow bib	Ref.
	1	27 November 2020	(Finland) Ruka	Sprint C	(Sweden) Linn Svahn	(Sweden) Maja Dahlqvist	(Sweden) Jonna Sundling	(Sweden) Linn Svahn	
	2	28 November 2020	(Finland) Ruka	10 km C	(Norway) Therese Johaug	(Sweden) Frida Karlsson	(Sweden) Ebba Andersson	(Sweden) Linn Svahn	
	3	29 November 2020	(Finland) Ruka	10 km F Pursuit	(Norway) Therese Johaug	(Norway) Helene Marie Fossesholm	(United States) Rosie Brennan	(Norway) Therese Johaug	
1	11th Nordic Opening Overall (27–29 November 2020)				(Norway) Therese Johaug	(Russia) Tatiana Sorina	(Sweden) Ebba Andersson	(Norway) Therese Johaug	
		4 December 2020	(Norway) Lillehammer	Sprint C	Rescheduled due to the COVID-19 pandemic. Not rescheduled.				
		5 December 2020	(Norway) Lillehammer	15 km Skiathlon	Rescheduled due to the COVID-19 pandemic. Not rescheduled.				
		6 December 2020	(Norway) Lillehammer	4 × 5 km Relay C/F	Rescheduled due to the COVID-19 pandemic. Not rescheduled.				
2	4	12 December 2020	(Switzerland) Davos	Sprint F	(United States) Rosie Brennan	(Slovenia) Anamarija Lampič	(Russia) Natalya Nepryayeva	(Norway) Therese Johaug	
3	5	13 December 2020	(Switzerland) Davos	10 km F	(United States) Rosie Brennan	(Russia) Yuliya Stupak	(United States) Hailey Swirbul	(United States) Rosie Brennan	
4	6	19 December 2020	(Germany) Dresden	Sprint F	(Switzerland) Nadine Fähndrich	(United States) Sophie Caldwell Hamilton	(Slovenia) Anamarija Lampič	(United States) Rosie Brennan	
		20 December 2020	(Germany) Dresden	Team Sprint F	Switzerland I Laurien van der Graaff; Nadine Fähndrich	Russia I Yuliya Stupak; Natalya Nepryayeva	Slovenia Eva Urevc; Anamarija Lampič	(United States) Rosie Brennan	
	7	1 January 2021	(Switzerland) Val Müstair	Sprint F	(Sweden) Linn Svahn	(Slovenia) Anamarija Lampič	(United States) Jessie Diggins	(United States) Rosie Brennan	
	8	2 January 2021	(Switzerland) Val Müstair	10 km C Mass Start	(Sweden) Linn Svahn	(Russia) Yuliya Stupak	(United States) Jessie Diggins	(United States) Rosie Brennan	
	9	3 January 2021	(Switzerland) Val Müstair	10 km F Pursuit	(United States) Jessie Diggins	(United States) Rosie Brennan	(Sweden) Frida Karlsson	(United States) Rosie Brennan	
	10	5 January 2021	(Italy) Toblach	10 km F	(United States) Jessie Diggins	(United States) Rosie Brennan	(Sweden) Ebba Andersson	(United States) Rosie Brennan	
	11	6 January 2021	(Italy) Toblach	10 km C Pursuit	(Russia) Yuliya Stupak	(Sweden) Ebba Andersson	(United States) Jessie Diggins	(United States) Rosie Brennan	
	12	8 January 2021	(Italy) Val di Fiemme	10 km C Mass Start	(Russia) Natalya Nepryayeva	(Germany) Katharina Hennig	(Sweden) Ebba Andersson	(United States) Rosie Brennan	
	13	9 January 2021	(Italy) Val di Fiemme	Sprint C	(Sweden) Linn Svahn	(Sweden) Maja Dahlqvist	(Sweden) Emma Ribom	(United States) Rosie Brennan	
	14	10 January 2021	(Italy) Val di Fiemme	10 km F Mass Start Climb	(Sweden) Ebba Andersson	(United States) Jessie Diggins	(France) Delphine Claudel	(United States) Rosie Brennan	
5	15th Tour de Ski Overall (1–10 January 2021)				(United States) Jessie Diggins	(Russia) Yuliya Stupak	(Sweden) Ebba Andersson	(United States) Jessie Diggins	
6	15	23 January 2021	(Finland) Lahti	15 km Skiathlon	(Norway) Therese Johaug	(Norway) Helene Marie Fossesholm	(Norway) Heidi Weng	(United States) Jessie Diggins	
		24 January 2021	(Finland) Lahti	4 × 5 km Relay C/F	Norway Tiril Udnes Weng; Therese Johaug; Helene Marie Fossesholm; Heidi Weng	Sweden Charlotte Kalla; Emma Ribom; Lovisa Modig; Ebba Andersson	Finland I Johanna Matintalo; Kerttu Niskanen; Laura Mononen; Krista Pärmäkoski	(United States) Jessie Diggins	
7	16	29 January 2021	(Sweden) Falun	10 km F	(United States) Jessie Diggins	(Norway) Therese Johaug	(Sweden) Ebba Andersson	(United States) Jessie Diggins	
8	17	30 January 2021	(Sweden) Falun	10 km C Mass Start	(Sweden) Linn Svahn	(Russia) Yuliya Stupak	(Norway) Therese Johaug	(United States) Jessie Diggins	
9	18	31 January 2021	(Sweden) Falun	Sprint C	(Sweden) Linn Svahn	(Slovenia) Anamarija Lampič	(Sweden) Jonna Sundling	(United States) Jessie Diggins	
10	19	6 February 2021	(Sweden) Ulricehamn	Sprint F	(Sweden) Maja Dahlqvist	(Sweden) Johanna Hagström	(United States) Jessie Diggins	(United States) Jessie Diggins	
		7 February 2021	(Sweden) Ulricehamn	Team Sprint F	Slovenia Eva Urevc; Anamarija Lampič	Sweden I Maja Dahlqvist; Linn Svahn	Switzerland I Laurien van der Graaff; Nadine Fähndrich	(United States) Jessie Diggins	
		20 February 2021	(Czech Republic) Nové Město	Sprint C	Cancelled due to the COVID-19 pandemic.				
		21 February 2021	(Czech Republic) Nové Město	10 km F	Cancelled due to the COVID-19 pandemic.				
FIS Nordic World Ski Championships 2021 (23 February–7 March)
11	20	13 March 2021	(Switzerland) Engadin	10 km C Mass Start	(Russia) Yuliya Stupak	(Norway) Heidi Weng	(Sweden) Ebba Andersson	(United States) Jessie Diggins	
12	21	14 March 2021	(Switzerland) Engadin	30 km F Pursuit	(Norway) Heidi Weng	(Sweden) Ebba Andersson	(Russia) Yuliya Stupak	(United States) Jessie Diggins	
		19 March 2021	(China) Beijing	Sprint F	Cancelled due to the COVID-19 pandemic.				
		20 March 2021	(China) Beijing	15 km Skiathlon	Cancelled due to the COVID-19 pandemic.				
		21 March 2021	(China) Beijing	10 km C Pursuit	Cancelled due to the COVID-19 pandemic.				
	2020–21 World Cup Finals Overall (19–21 March 2021)				Cancelled due to the COVID-19 pandemic.				

== Men's standings ==
=== Overall ===
Rank	after all 26 events	Points
	(Russia) Alexander Bolshunov	1765
2	(Russia) Ivan Yakimushkin	800
3	(Norway) Johannes Høsflot Klæbo	663
4	(Italy) Federico Pellegrino	614
5	(Russia) Artem Maltsev	604
6	(France) Maurice Manificat	597
7	(Russia) Evgeniy Belov	590
8	(Russia) Andrey Melnichenko	586
9	(Russia) Denis Spitsov	567
10	(Sweden) Oskar Svensson	484

=== Distance ===
Rank	after all 15 events	Points
	(Russia) Alexander Bolshunov	921
2	(Russia) Ivan Yakimushkin	509
3	(Norway) Simen Hegstad Krüger	357
4	(Russia) Denis Spitsov	327
5	(Russia) Evgeniy Belov	321
6	(Russia) Andrey Melnichenko	319
7	(Norway) Hans Christer Holund	318
8	(Norway) Johannes Høsflot Klæbo	317
9	(Switzerland) Dario Cologna	303
10	(Russia) Artem Maltsev	298

=== Sprint ===
Rank	after all 9 events	Points
	(Italy) Federico Pellegrino	439
2	(Russia) Gleb Retivykh	369
3	(Russia) Alexander Bolshunov	284
4	(Sweden) Oskar Svensson	283
5	(France) Lucas Chanavat	219
6	(France) Richard Jouve	214
7	(United Kingdom) Andrew Young	157
8	(Norway) Johannes Høsflot Klæbo	146
9	(Russia) Alexander Terentyev	140
10	(France) Valentin Chauvin	132

=== Prize money ===
Rank	after all 36 payouts	CHF
1	(Russia) Alexander Bolshunov	219.500
2	(Norway) Johannes Høsflot Klæbo	76.000
3	(Russia) Ivan Yakimushkin	57.725
4	(France) Maurice Manificat	56.100
5	(Italy) Federico Pellegrino	54.100
6	(Russia) Denis Spitsov	43.400
7	(Russia) Artem Maltsev	36.550
8	(Norway) Emil Iversen	33.850
9	(Russia) Gleb Retivykh	31.000
10	(Norway) Simen Hegstad Krüger	30.200

=== U23 ===
Rank	after all 26 events	Points
	(France) Hugo Lapalus	292
2	(United States) Gus Schumacher	213
3	(Russia) Alexander Terentyev	206
4	(Sweden) William Poromaa	184
5	(Switzerland) Janik Riebli	77
6	(Switzerland) Valerio Grond	71
7	(Norway) Harald Østberg Amundsen	68
8	(Germany) Friedrich Moch	54
9	(United States) JC Schoonmaker	44
10	(Austria) Mika Vermeulen	31

=== Bonus Ranking ===
Rank	after all 10 events	Points
1	(Russia) Alexander Bolshunov	207
2	(Russia) Gleb Retivykh	106
3	(Italy) Federico Pellegrino	76
4	(Russia) Ivan Yakimushkin	56
5	(Russia) Evgeniy Belov	49
6	(Norway) Johannes Høsflot Klæbo	48
7	(Norway) Pål Golberg	46
8	(Norway) Emil Iversen	45
9	(Russia) Artem Maltsev	44
10	(France) Richard Jouve	42

== Women's standings ==
=== Overall ===
Rank	after all 26 events	Points
	(United States) Jessie Diggins	1347
2	(Russia) Yuliya Stupak	1079
3	(Sweden) Ebba Andersson	1011
4	(United States) Rosie Brennan	919
5	(Russia) Tatiana Sorina	851
6	(Russia) Natalya Nepryayeva	733
7	(Sweden) Linn Svahn	688
8	(Slovenia) Anamarija Lampič	643
9	(Norway) Therese Johaug	611
10	(Switzerland) Nadine Fähndrich	597

=== Distance ===
Rank	after all 15 events	Points
	(United States) Jessie Diggins	653
2	(Sweden) Ebba Andersson	640
3	(Russia) Yuliya Stupak	619
4	(United States) Rosie Brennan	484
5	(Norway) Therese Johaug	410
6	(Germany) Katharina Hennig	406
7	(Norway) Heidi Weng	376
8	(Russia) Tatiana Sorina	364
9	(Norway) Helene Marie Fossesholm	359
10	(Russia) Natalya Nepryayeva	323

=== Sprint ===
Rank	after all 9 events	Points
	(Slovenia) Anamarija Lampič	402
2	(Switzerland) Nadine Fähndrich	296
3	(Sweden) Linn Svahn	275
4	(United States) Jessie Diggins	262
5	(Sweden) Maja Dahlqvist	244
6	(Russia) Natalya Nepryayeva	214
7	(Sweden) Jonna Sundling	212
8	(Slovenia) Eva Urevc	189
9	(United States) Rosie Brennan	185
10	(United States) Sophie Caldwell Hamilton	171

=== Prize money ===
Rank	after all 36 payouts	CHF
1	(United States) Jessie Diggins	157.450
2	(Russia) Yuliya Stupak	111.550
3	(Sweden) Ebba Andersson	91.025
4	(Norway) Therese Johaug	62.750
5	(United States) Rosie Brennan	61.750
6	(Sweden) Linn Svahn	61.250
7	(Russia) Tatiana Sorina	53.900
8	(Slovenia) Anamarija Lampič	39.400
9	(Russia) Natalya Nepryayeva	35.500
10	(Norway) Heidi Weng	31.850

=== U23 ===
Rank	after all 26 events	Points
	(Sweden) Linn Svahn	688
2	(Norway) Helene Marie Fossesholm	439
3	(Sweden) Frida Karlsson	435
4	(United States) Hailey Swirbul	268
5	(Sweden) Johanna Hagström	145
6	(Latvia) Patrīcija Eiduka	144
7	(Sweden) Moa Lundgren	124
8	(Russia) Hristina Matsokina	106
9	(Czech Republic) Tereza Beranová	87
10	(Norway) Hedda Østberg Amundsen	51

=== Bonus Ranking ===
Rank	after all 10 events	Points
1	(Sweden) Linn Svahn	119
2	(United States) Jessie Diggins	101
3	(Sweden) Ebba Andersson	94
4	(Sweden) Maja Dahlqvist	70
5	(Russia) Natalya Nepryayeva	69
6	(Slovenia) Anamarija Lampič	67
7	(Sweden) Frida Karlsson	63
8	(Sweden) Emma Ribom	52
9	(Norway) Therese Johaug	47
10	(Russia) Yuliya Stupak	45

== Nations Cup ==
=== Overall ===
Rank	after all 52 events	Points
1	Russia	7485
2	Norway	4525
3	Sweden	4432
4	United States	3757
5	Switzerland	2386
6	Finland	2317
7	Germany	2262
8	France	2233
9	Italy	1956
10	Slovenia	1160

=== Men ===
Rank	after all 26 events	Points
1	Russia	4450
2	Norway	2482
3	France	1976
4	Italy	1359
5	Switzerland	1343
6	Sweden	1260
7	Finland	1082
8	Germany	992
9	United States	736
10	Great Britain	715

=== Women ===
Rank	after all 26 events	Points
1	Sweden	3172
2	Russia	3035
3	United States	3021
4	Norway	2043
5	Germany	1270
6	Finland	1235
7	Slovenia	1077
8	Switzerland	1043
9	Czech Republic	749
10	Italy	597

== Points distribution ==
The table shows the number of points won in the 2020/21 Cross-Country Skiing World Cup for men and women. Team Sprint and Relay used to count only for Nations Cup but from this season they were also included in individual standings.

Place	1	2	3	4	5	6	7	8	9	10	11	12	13	14	15	16	17	18	19	20	21	22	23	24	25	26	27	28	29	30	31 - 40	>40
Individual	100	80	60	50	45	40	36	32	29	26	24	22	20	18	16	15	14	13	12	11	10	9	8	7	6	5	4	3	2	1
Nordic Opening	200	160	120	100	90	80	72	64	58	52	48	44	40	36	32	30	28	26	24	22	20	18	16	14	12	10	8	6	4	2
World Cup Final	200	160	120	100	90	80	72	64	58	52	48	44	40	36	32	30	28	26	24	22	20	18	16	14	12	10	8	6	4	2
Relay (Nations Cup)	200	160	120	100	90	80	72	64	58	52	48	44	40	36	32	30	28	26	24	22	20	18	16	14	12	10	8	6	4	2
Team Sprint (Nations Cup)	200	160	120	100	90	80	72	64	58	52	48	44	40	36	32	30	28	26	24	22	20	18	16	14	12	10	8	6	4	2
Tour de Ski	400	320	240	200	180	160	144	128	116	104	96	88	80	72	64	60	56	52	48	44	40	36	32	28	24	20	20	20	20	20	10	5
Stage Nordic Opening	50	46	43	40	37	34	32	30	28	26	24	22	20	18	16	15	14	13	12	11	10	9	8	7	6	5	4	3	2	1
Stage Tour de Ski	50	46	43	40	37	34	32	30	28	26	24	22	20	18	16	15	14	13	12	11	10	9	8	7	6	5	4	3	2	1
Stage World Cup Final	50	46	43	40	37	34	32	30	28	26	24	22	20	18	16	15	14	13	12	11	10	9	8	7	6	5	4	3	2	1
Relay (Individual points)	25	20	15	12	11	10	9	8	7	6	5	4	3	2	1
Team Sprint (Individual points)	25	20	15	12	11	10	9	8	7	6	5	4	3	2	1
Bonus points (Mass Start checkpoints)	15	12	10	8	6	5	4	3	2	1

== Achievements ==
Only individual events.

First World Cup career victory

Men

- (Norway) Erik Valnes, 24, in his 4th season – the WC 1 (Sprint C) in Ruka; first podium was 2018–19 WC 8 (Sprint F) in Dresden
- (Sweden) Oskar Svensson, 25, in his 8th season – the WC 5 (Sprint C) in Val di Fiemme; also first podium
- (Russia) Denis Spitsov, 24, in his 4th season – the WC 5 (10 km Mass Start F) in Val di Fiemme; first podium was 2017–18 WC 8 (9 km Pursuit F) in Val di Fiemme

Women

- (United States) Rosie Brennan, 31, in her 10th season – the WC 2 (Sprint F) in Davos; first podium was 2020–21 WC 1 (10 km Pursuit F) in Ruka
- (Switzerland) Nadine Fähndrich, 25, in her 6th season – the WC 4 (Sprint F) in Dresden; first podium was 2018–19 WC 14 (10 km C) in Cogne
- (Sweden) Ebba Andersson, 23, in her 5th season – the WC 5 (10 km Mass Start F) in Val di Fiemme; first podium was 2018–19 WC 2 (10 km C) in Ruka
- (Sweden) Maja Dahlqvist, 26, in her 7th season – the WC 10 (Sprint F) in Ulricehamn; first podium was 2017–18 WC 9 (Sprint F) in Dresden

First World Cup podium

Men

- (Russia) Aleksey Chervotkin, 25, in his 7th season – no. 2 in the WC 1 (15 km C) in Ruka
- (Russia) Artem Maltsev, 27, in his 5th season – no. 3 in the WC 3 (15 km F) in Davos
- (Sweden) Oskar Svensson, 25, in his 8th season – no. 1 in the WC 5 (Sprint C) in Val di Fiemme
- (Sweden) Jens Burman, 26, in his 7th season – no. 3 in the WC 12 (50 km Pursuit F) in Engadin

Women

- (Norway) Helene Marie Fossesholm, 19, in her 2nd season – no. 2 in the WC 1 (10 km Pursuit F) in Ruka
- (United States) Rosie Brennan, 31, in her 10th season – no. 3 in the WC 1 (10 km Pursuit F) in Ruka
- (Russia) Tatiana Sorina, 26, in her 4th season – no. 2 in the WC 1 (11th Nordic Opening overall) in Ruka
- (United States) Hailey Swirbul, 22, in her 3rd season – no. 3 in the WC 3 (10 km F) in Davos
- (Sweden) Emma Ribom, 23, in her 3rd season – no. 3 in the WC 5 (Sprint C) in Val di Fiemme
- (France) Delphine Claudel, 24, in her 5th season – no. 3 in the WC 5 (10 km Mass Start F) in Val di Fiemme

Victories in this World Cup (all-time number of victories in parentheses)

Men

- (Russia) Alexander Bolshunov, 10 (27) first places
- (Norway) Johannes Høsflot Klæbo, 3 (40) first places
- (Italy) Federico Pellegrino, 3 (16) first places
- (Sweden) Oskar Svensson, 2 (2) first places
- (Norway) Emil Iversen, 1 (8) first place
- (Norway) Simen Hegstad Krüger, 1 (4) first place
- (Norway) Hans Christer Holund, 1 (2) first place
- (Norway) Erik Valnes, 1 (1) first place
- (Russia) Denis Spitsov, 1 (1) first place

Women

- (Sweden) Linn Svahn, 6 (9) first places
- (Norway) Therese Johaug, 4 (77) first places
- (United States) Jessie Diggins, 4 (10) first places
- (Russia) Yuliya Stupak, 2 (3) first places
- (United States) Rosie Brennan, 2 (2) first places
- (Norway) Heidi Weng, 1 (12) first place
- (Russia) Natalya Nepryayeva, 1 (3) first place
- (Switzerland) Nadine Fähndrich, 1 (1) first place
- (Sweden) Ebba Andersson, 1 (1) first place
- (Sweden) Maja Dahlqvist, 1 (1) first place

== Retirements ==
Men

- (Switzerland) Livio Bieler
- (Norway) Niklas Dyrhaug
- (Germany) Sebastian Eisenlauer
- (United States) Simeon Hamilton
- (Norway) Martin Johnsrud Sundby
- (Sweden) Viktor Thorn
- (Italy) Stefan Zelger

Women

- (United States) Sadie Maubet Bjornsen
- (Norway) Mari Eide
- (France) Anouk Faivre-Picon
- (Sweden) Hanna Falk
- (United States) Sophie Caldwell Hamilton
- (Finland) Laura Mononen
- (Finland) Susanna Saapunki
- (Russia) Anna Zherebyateva
