= Maurice Manificat =

French cross-country skier (born 1986)

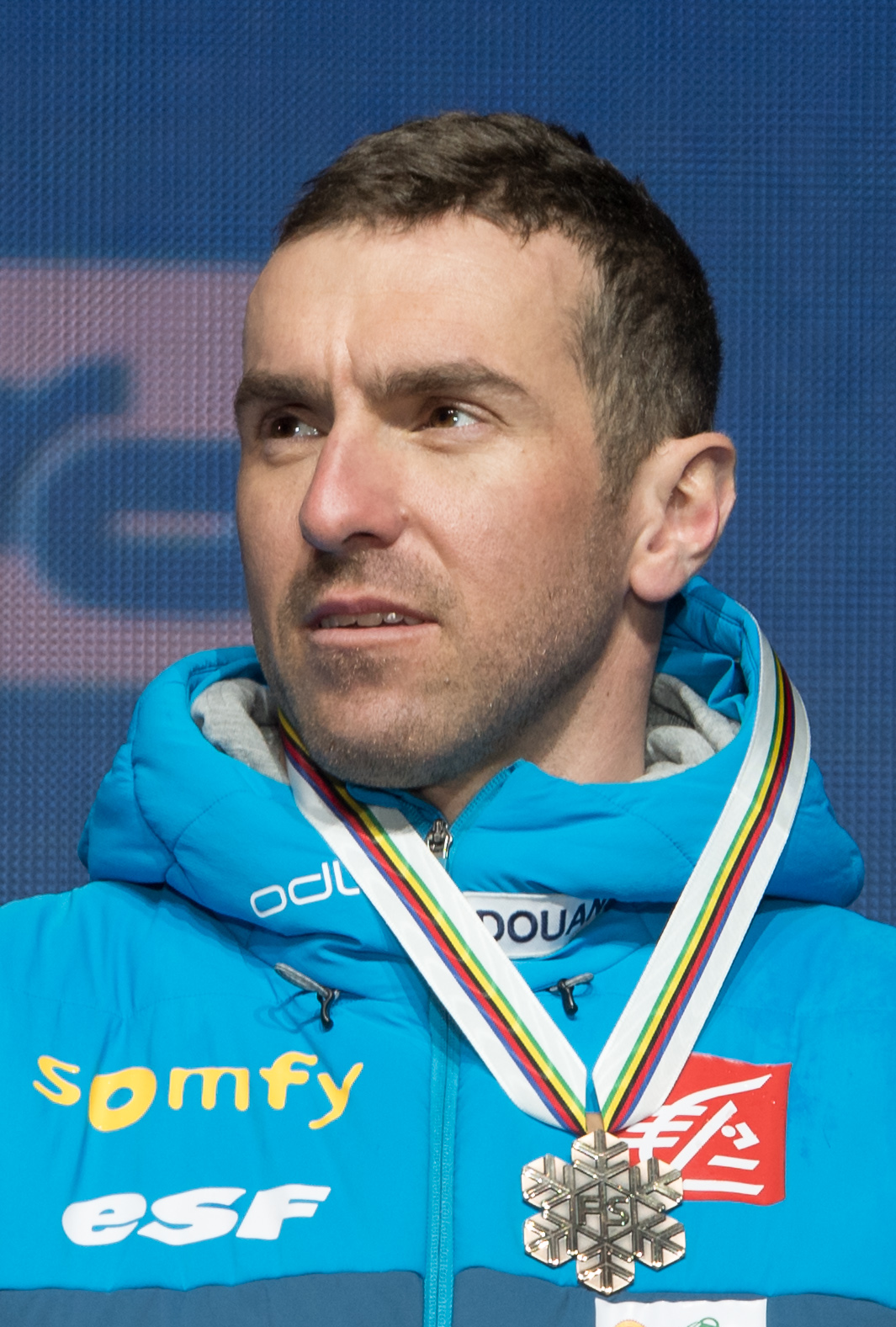
- Manificat in 2019

Personal information
- Nationality: France
- Born: 4 April 1986 (age 40) Sallanches, Haute-Savoie, France
- Height: 1.85 m (6 ft 1 in)

Sport
- Sport: Skiing
- Club: SC Agy St Sigismond

World Cup career
- Seasons: 17 – (2007–present)
- Indiv. starts: 249
- Indiv. podiums: 34
- Indiv. wins: 10
- Team starts: 16
- Team podiums: 2
- Team wins: 0
- Overall titles: 0 – (5th in 2010, 2016)
- Discipline titles: 0
Medal record
Men's cross-country skiing
Representing France
International nordic ski competitions
Event	1st	2nd	3rd
Olympic Games	0	0	4
World Championships	0	1	3
Total	0	1	7
Olympic Games
Bronze medal – third place	2014 Sochi	4 × 10 km relay
Bronze medal – third place	2018 Pyeongchang	4 × 10 km relay
Bronze medal – third place	2018 Pyeongchang	Team sprint
Bronze medal – third place	2022 Beijing	4 × 10 km relay
World Championships
Silver medal – second place	2015 Falun	15 km freestyle
Bronze medal – third place	2015 Falun	4 × 10 km relay
Bronze medal – third place	2019 Seefeld	4 × 10 km relay
Bronze medal – third place	2021 Oberstdorf	4 × 10 km relay
U23 World Championships
Gold medal – first place	2009 Praz de Lys-Sommand	15 km freestyle
Bronze medal – third place	2008 Mals	30 km freestyle
Junior World Championships
Bronze medal – third place	2005 Rovaniemi	4 × 10 km relay
- Updated on 28 March 2023

Maurice Manificat (French pronunciation: [mɔʁis manifika]; born 4 April 1986) is a French cross-country skier who has competed since 2004.

== Career ==
He has achieved three World Cup victories, in Lahti (March 2010), in Canmore (December 2012), both in the 15 km + 15 km double pursuit event, and in Davos (December 2017), in 15 km freestyle.

Manificat also finished 47th in the 15 km + 15 km double pursuit event at the FIS Nordic World Ski Championships 2009 in Liberec.

At the 2010 Winter Olympics in Vancouver, he finished fourth in the 4 x 10 km relay.

He won the bronze medals in the 4 x 10 km relay at the 2014 Winter Olympics in Sochi and the 2018 Winter Olympics in PyeongChang.

In the World Championship in Falun 2015, he won the silver medal in 15 km freestyle. Johan Olsson of Sweden won the race.

== Cross-country skiing results ==
All results are sourced from the International Ski Federation (FIS).

=== Olympic Games ===
- 4 medals – (4 bronze)

Year	Age	15 km individual	30 km skiathlon	50 km mass start	Sprint	4 × 10 km relay	Team sprint
2010	23	6	26	—	—	4	—
2014	27	—	8	43	—	Bronze	—
2018	31	5	5	—	—	Bronze	Bronze
2022	35	12	23	10^{[a]}	—	Bronze	—

^{a} Distance reduced to 30 km due to weather conditions.

=== World Championships ===
- 4 medals – (1 silver, 3 bronze)

Year	Age	15 km individual	30 km skiathlon	50 km mass start	Sprint	4 × 10 km relay	Team sprint
2009	22	—	47	—	—	—	—
2011	24	6	22	45	—	11	—
2013	26	18	21	24	—	9	6
2015	28	Silver	5	14	—	Bronze	—
2017	30	23	14	9	—	7	—
2019	32	25	—	—	—	Bronze	—
2021	34	16	—	26	—	Bronze	—
2023	36	17	—	32	—	—	—

=== World Cup ===
==== Season standings ====
Season	Age	Discipline standings			Ski Tour standings				
Season	Age	Overall	Distance	Sprint	Nordic Opening	Tour de Ski	Ski Tour 2020	World Cup Final	Ski Tour Canada
2007	21	NC	NC	—	—N/a	—	—N/a	—N/a	—N/a
2008	22	142	84	—	—N/a	—	—N/a	39	—N/a
2009	23	55	39	NC	—N/a	—	—N/a	17	—N/a
2010	24	5	8	55	—N/a	19	—N/a	2nd place, silver medalist(s)	—N/a
2011	25	13	10	88	19	17	—N/a	5	—N/a
2012	26	8	9	59	8	7	—N/a	20	—N/a
2013	27	26	15	NC	14	—	—N/a	—	—N/a
2014	28	23	20	74	4	DNF	—N/a	28	—N/a
2015	29	17	10	72	DNF	15	—N/a	—N/a	—N/a
2016	30	5	2nd place, silver medalist(s)	39	14	13	—N/a	—N/a	4
2017	31	13	13	78	34	4	—N/a	11	—N/a
2018	32	8	5	78	8	11	—N/a	26	—N/a
2019	33	25	15	94	—	21	—N/a	34	—N/a
2020	34	46	30	NC	34	26	29	—N/a	—N/a
2021	35	6	14	57	—	2nd place, silver medalist(s)	—N/a	—N/a	—N/a
2022	36	52	31	—	—N/a	—	—N/a	—N/a	—N/a
2023	37	110	62	NC	—N/a	DNF	—N/a	—N/a	—N/a

==== Individual podiums ====
- 10 victories – (6 WC, 4 SWC)
- 34 podiums – (17 WC, 17 SWC)

No.	Season	Date	Location	Race	Level	Place
1	2009–10	12 December 2009	Davos, Switzerland	15 km Individual F	World Cup	3rd
2	2009–10	6 March 2010	Lahti, Finland	15 km + 15 km Pursuit C/F	World Cup	1st
3	2009–10	21 March 2010	Falun, Sweden	15 km Pursuit F	Stage World Cup	1st
4	2009–10	17–21 March 2010	(Sweden) World Cup Final	Overall Standings	World Cup	2nd
5	2010–11	4 February 2011	Rybinsk, Russia	10 km + 10 km Pursuit C/F	World Cup	3rd
6	2010–11	12 March 2011	Lahti, Finland	10 km + 10 km Pursuit C/F	World Cup	3rd
7	2010–11	20 March 2011	Falun, Sweden	15 km Pursuit F	Stage World Cup	2nd
8	2011–12	26 November 2011	Rukatunturi, Finland	10 km Individual F	Stage World Cup	3rd
9	2011–12	10 December 2011	Davos, Switzerland	30 km Individual F	World Cup	2nd
10	2011–12	29 December 2011	Oberhof, Germany	3.75 km Individual F	Stage World Cup	3rd
11	2011–12	8 January 2012	Val di Fiemme, Italy	9 km Pursuit F	Stage World Cup	2nd
12	2012–13	1 December 2012	Rukatunturi, Finland	10 km Individual F	Stage World Cup	3rd
13	2012–13	16 December 2012	Canmore, Canada	15 km + 15 km Skiathlon C/F	World Cup	1st
14	2013–14	1 December 2013	Rukatunturi, Finland	15 km Pursuit F	Stage World Cup	2nd
15	2013–14	14 December 2013	Davos, Switzerland	30 km Individual F	World Cup	1st
16	2014–15	11 January 2015	Val di Fiemme, Italy	9 km Pursuit F	Stage World Cup	2nd
17	2014–15	15 February 2015	Östersund, Sweden	15 km Individual F	World Cup	2nd
18	2015–16	12 December 2015	Davos, Switzerland	30 km Individual F	World Cup	2nd
19	2015–16	8 January 2016	Toblach, Italy	10 km Individual F	Stage World Cup	3rd
20	2015–16	23 January 2016	Nové Město, Czech Republic	15 km Individual F	World Cup	1st
21	2015–16	13 February 2016	Falun, Sweden	10 km Individual C	World Cup	3rd
22	2015–16	8 March 2016	Canmore, Canada	1.5 km Sprint C	Stage World Cup	3rd
23	2015–16	12 March 2016	Canmore, Canada	15 km Pursuit C	Stage World Cup	1st
24	2016–17	6 January 2017	Toblach, Italy	10 km Individual F	Stage World Cup	2nd
25	2016–17	8 January 2017	Val di Fiemme, Italy	9 km Pursuit F	Stage World Cup	1st
26	2017–18	11 November 2017	Rukatunturi, Finland	15 km Pursuit F	Stage World Cup	1st
27	2017–18	10 December 2017	Davos, Switzerland	15 km Individual F	World Cup	1st
28	2017–18	16 December 2017	Toblach, Italy	15 km Individual F	World Cup	2nd
29	2017–18	7 January 2018	Val di Fiemme, Italy	9 km Pursuit F	Stage World Cup	2nd
30	2018–19	16 December 2018	Davos, Switzerland	15 km Individual F	World Cup	2nd
31	2018–19	26 January 2019	Ulricehamn, Sweden	15 km Individual F	World Cup	1st
32	2020–21	3 January 2021	Val Müstair, Switzerland	15 km Pursuit F	Stage World Cup	3rd
33	2020–21	10 January 2021	Val di Fiemme, Italy	10 km Mass Start F	Stage World Cup	3rd
34	2020–21	1–10 January 2021	(Switzerland) (Italy) Tour de Ski	Overall Standings	World Cup	2nd

==== Team podiums ====
- 2 podiums – (2 RL)

No.	Season	Date	Location	Race	Level	Place	Teammates
1	2008–09	7 December 2008	La Clusaz, France	4 × 10 km Relay C/F	World Cup	3rd	Gaillard / Vittoz / Jonnier
2	2016–17	18 December 2016	La Clusaz, France	4 × 7.5 km Relay C/F	World Cup	3rd	Gaillard / Jeannerod / Parisse
