= Markus Vuorela =

Finnish cross-country skier (born 1996)

Markus Vuorela (born 28 May 1996) is a Finnish cross-country skier.

== Career ==
At the Junior World Championships he competed in 2016, 2017 (U23) and 2019 (U23) with his best individual finish being 13th in the 2017 sprint.

He made his World Cup debut in March 2018 in Lahti, but went several years without collecting World Cup points. During the 2021 Tour de Ski, he performed well in Val di Fiemme with a 16th and 7th place, ensuring a 27th place overall. YLE called him "the major blue-white sensation" during the tour. In the run-up to the 2021-22 FIS Cross-Country World Cup, he sustained a fracture in his wrist. Still, from 2022 he collected World Cup points more or less consistently, breaking into the top 20 several times.

Vuorela also competed at the 2021 and 2023 World Championships, with his best finish being 28th in the 15 kilometre freestyle race in 2021. He was brought into the 2023 squad as a reserve for Arsi Ruuskanen.
