= Podyvotye =

Podyvotye Подывотье
- Selo
- Location within Bryansk Oblast Location within Russia
- Coordinates: 52°03′N 34°08′E
- Country: Russia
- Region: Bryansk Oblast
- District: Sevsky District
- Time zone: UTC+3:00

Podyvotye (Russian: Подывотье) is a rural locality (a selo) in Sevsky District, Bryansk Oblast, Russia. The population was 540 as of 2010. There are 7 streets.

== Geography ==
Podyvotye is located 31 km southwest of Sevsk (the district's administrative centre) by road. Saranchino is the nearest rural locality.

== Notable citizens ==
- Alexander Bolshunov
