= Artem Maltsev =

Russian cross-country skier

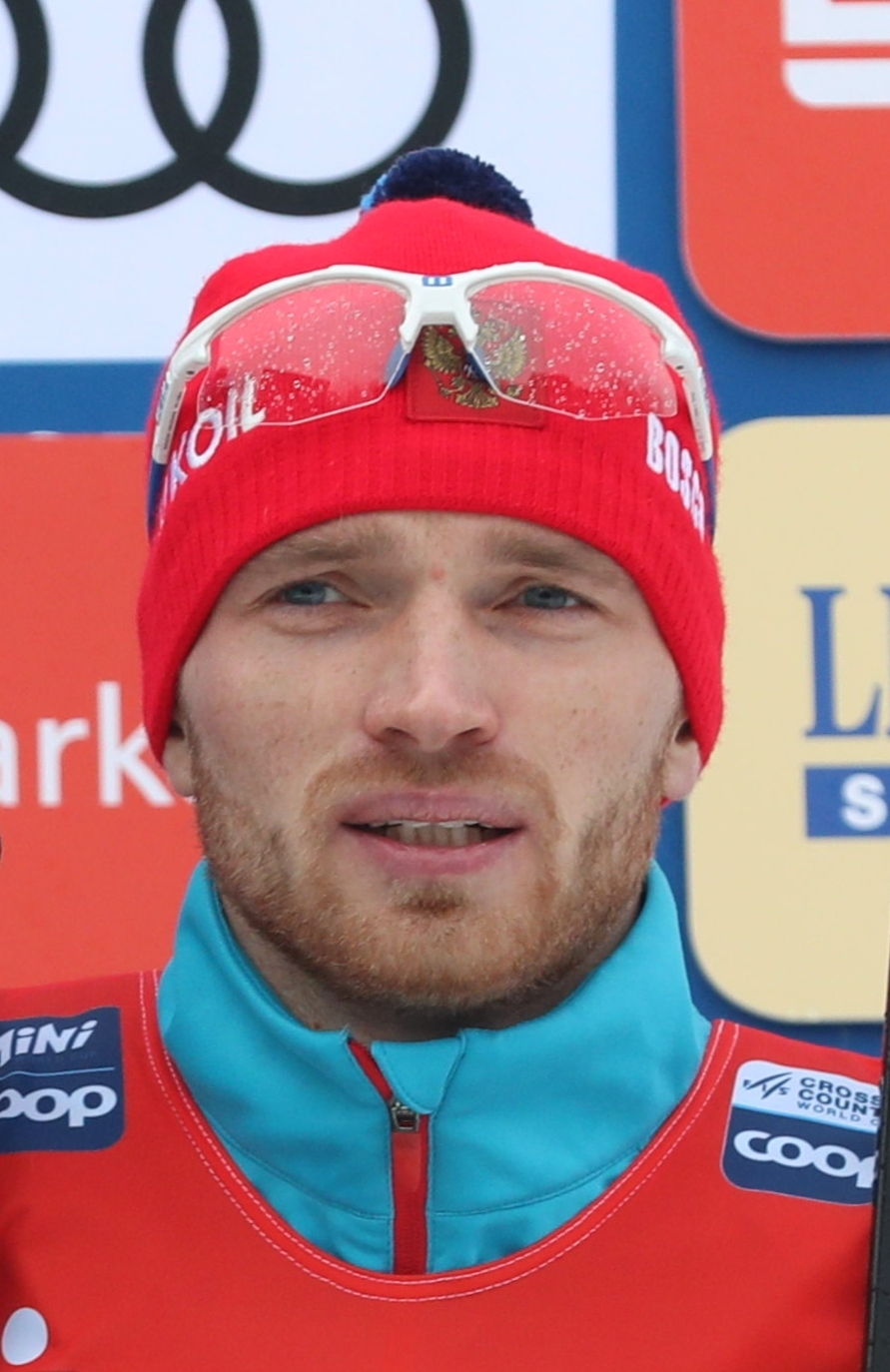
- Maltsev in 2019

Personal information
- Full name: Artem Igorevich Maltsev
- Nationality: Russia
- Born: 24 May 1993 (age 33) Nizhny Novgorod, Russia

Sport
- Sport: Skiing

World Cup career
- Seasons: 5 – (2018–2022)
- Indiv. starts: 55
- Indiv. podiums: 3
- Indiv. wins: 0
- Team starts: 8
- Team podiums: 4
- Team wins: 1
- Overall titles: 0 – (5th in 2021)
- Discipline titles: 0
Medal record
Men's cross-country skiing
Representing Russian Ski Federation
World Championships
Silver medal – second place	2021 Oberstdorf	4 × 10 km relay
Representing Russia
Junior World Championships
Gold medal – first place	2012 Erzurum	4 × 5 km relay
Gold medal – first place	2013 Liberec	4 × 5 km relay
Silver medal – second place	2012 Erzurum	20 km skiathlon
Silver medal – second place	2013 Liberec	10 km freestyle
Silver medal – second place	2013 Liberec	20 km skiathlon
Military World Games
Gold medal – first place	2017 Sochi	Team sprint
Silver medal – second place	2017 Sochi	15 km freestyle team
- Updated on 23 March 2023

Artem Igorevich Maltsev (Russian: Артём Игоревич Мальцев; born 24 May 1993) is a Russian cross-country skier.

== Cross-country skiing results ==
All results are sourced from the International Ski Federation (FIS).

=== Olympic Games ===
Year	Age	15 km individual	30 km skiathlon	50 km mass start	Sprint	4 × 10 km relay	Team sprint
2022	28	—	9	4^{[a]}	5	—	—

^{a} Distance reduced to 30 km due to weather conditions.

=== World Championships ===
- 1 medal – (1 silver)

Year	Age	15 km individual	30 km skiathlon	50 km mass start	Sprint	4 × 10 km relay	Team sprint
2019	25	—	—	—	17	—	—
2021	27	5	—	—	—	Silver	—

=== World Cup ===
==== Season standings ====
Season	Age	Discipline standings			Ski Tour standings			
Season	Age	Overall	Distance	Sprint	Nordic Opening	Tour de Ski	Ski Tour 2020	World Cup Final
2018	24	NC	—	NC	—	—	—N/a	—
2019	25	76	—	38	—	—	—N/a	—
2020	26	20	20	40	20	9	24	—N/a
2021	27	5	10	11	—	5	—N/a	—N/a
2022 (Note: On 1 March 2022, following the 2022 Russian invasion of Ukraine, FIS decided to not allow athletes from Russian and Belarus to take part in FIS competitions, with an immediate effect.)	28	22	14	59	—N/a	16	—N/a	

==== Individual podiums ====
- 3 podiums – (2 WC, 1 SWC)

No.	Season	Date	Location	Race	Level	Place
1	2020–21	13 December 2020	Davos, Switzerland	15 km Individual F	World Cup	3rd
2	2020–21	3 January 2021	Val Müstair, Switzerland	15 km Pursuit F	Stage World Cup	2nd
3	2021–22	28 November 2021	Rukatunturi, Finland	15 km Pursuit F	World Cup	3rd

==== Team podiums ====
- 1 victory – (1 RL)
- 4 podiums – (2 RL, 2 TS)

No.	Season	Date	Location	Race	Level	Place	Teammate(s)
1	2016–17	5 February 2017	Pyeongchang, South Korea	6 × 1.5 km Team Sprint F	World Cup	3rd	Kryukov
2	2018–19	13 January 2019	Dresden, Germany	6 × 1.6 km Team Sprint F	World Cup	3rd	Retivykh
3	2018–19	27 January 2019	Ulricehamn, Sweden	4 × 7.5 km Relay C/F	World Cup	1st	Belov / Bessmertnykh / Spitsov
4	2021–22	5 December 2021	Lillehammer, Norway	4 × 7.5 km Relay C/F	World Cup	2nd	Terentyev / Semikov / Ustiugov
