= Oskar Svensson =

Swedish cross-country skier

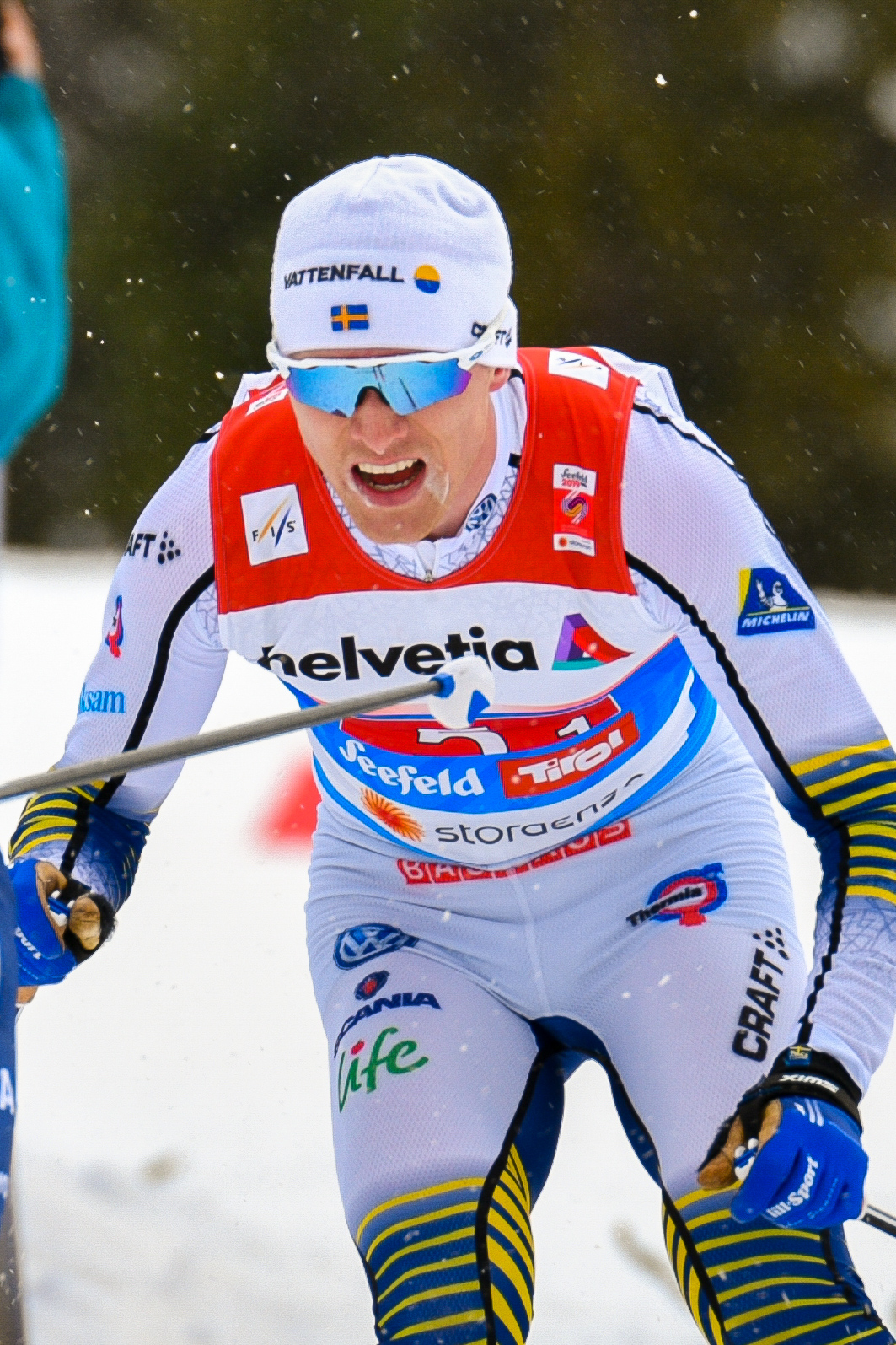
- Oskar Svensson during the World Championships in Seefeld in Tirol, Austria in March 2019

Personal information
- Full name: Erik Oskar Svensson
- Nationality: Sweden
- Born: 7 September 1995 (age 30) Falun, Sweden

Sport
- Sport: Skiing
- Club: Falun-Borlänge SK

World Cup career
- Seasons: 10 – (2014–present)
- Indiv. starts: 131
- Indiv. podiums: 3
- Indiv. wins: 2
- Team starts: 8
- Team podiums: 0
- Overall titles: 0 – (10th in 2021)
- Discipline titles: 0
Medal record
Men's cross-country skiing
Representing Sweden
World Championships
Bronze medal – third place	2025 Trondheim	Team sprint
Junior World Championships
Silver medal – second place	2014 Val di Fiemme	Individual sprint
Bronze medal – third place	2013 Liberec	4 × 5 km relay
- Updated on 28 March 2022

Oskar Svensson (born 7 September 1995) is a Swedish cross-country skier who represents Falun-Borlänge SK.

He competed at the FIS Nordic World Ski Championships 2017 in Lahti, Finland, finishing 19th in the freestyle sprint event. At the 2018 Winter Olympics he finished fifth in the classical sprint event.

== Cross-country skiing results ==
All results are sourced from the International Ski Federation (FIS).

=== Olympic Games ===
Year	Age	15 km individual	30 km skiathlon	50 km mass start	Sprint	4 × 10 km relay	Team sprint
2018	22	—	—	—	5	—	—
2022	26	—	—	—	6	4	4

=== World Championships ===
- 1 medal (1 bronze)

Year	Age	15 km individual	30 km skiathlon	50 km mass start	Sprint	4 × 10 km relay	Team sprint
2017	21	—	—	—	19	—	—
2019	23	—	29	—	10	5	4
2021	25	—	—	—	6	4	6
2025	29	—	—	—	24	—	Bronze

=== World Cup ===
==== Season standings ====
Season	Age	Discipline standings				Ski Tour standings				
Season	Age	Overall	Distance	Sprint	U23	Nordic Opening	Tour de Ski	Ski Tour 2020	World Cup Final	Ski Tour Canada
2014	19	NC	NC	NC	—N/a	—	—	—N/a	—	—N/a
2015	20	145	—	89	25	—	—	—N/a	—N/a	—N/a
2016	21	52	57	23	4	—	37	—N/a	—N/a	41
2017	22	43	89	18	4	47	—	—N/a	—	—N/a
2018	23	31	41	18	5	—	28	—N/a	18	—N/a
2019	24	32	45	16	—N/a	49	DNF	—N/a	19	—N/a
2020	25	45	NC	14	—N/a	58	39	—	—N/a	—N/a
2021	26	10	26	4	—N/a	54	16	—N/a	—N/a	—N/a
2022	27	44	55	26	—N/a	—N/a	36	—N/a	—N/a	—N/a
2023	28	49	92	28	—N/a	—N/a	45	—N/a	—N/a	—N/a

==== Individual podiums ====
- 2 victories – (1 WC, 1 SWC)
- 3 podiums – (2 WC, 1 SWC)

No.	Season	Date	Location	Race	Level	Place
1	2020–21	9 January 2021	Val di Fiemme, Italy	1.5 km Sprint C	Stage World Cup	1st
2	2020–21	31 January 2021	Falun, Sweden	1.4 km Sprint C	World Cup	2nd
3	2020–21	6 February 2021	Ulricehamn, Sweden	1.5 km Sprint F	World Cup	1st
