= Alexander Bolshunov =

Russian cross-country skier (born 1996)

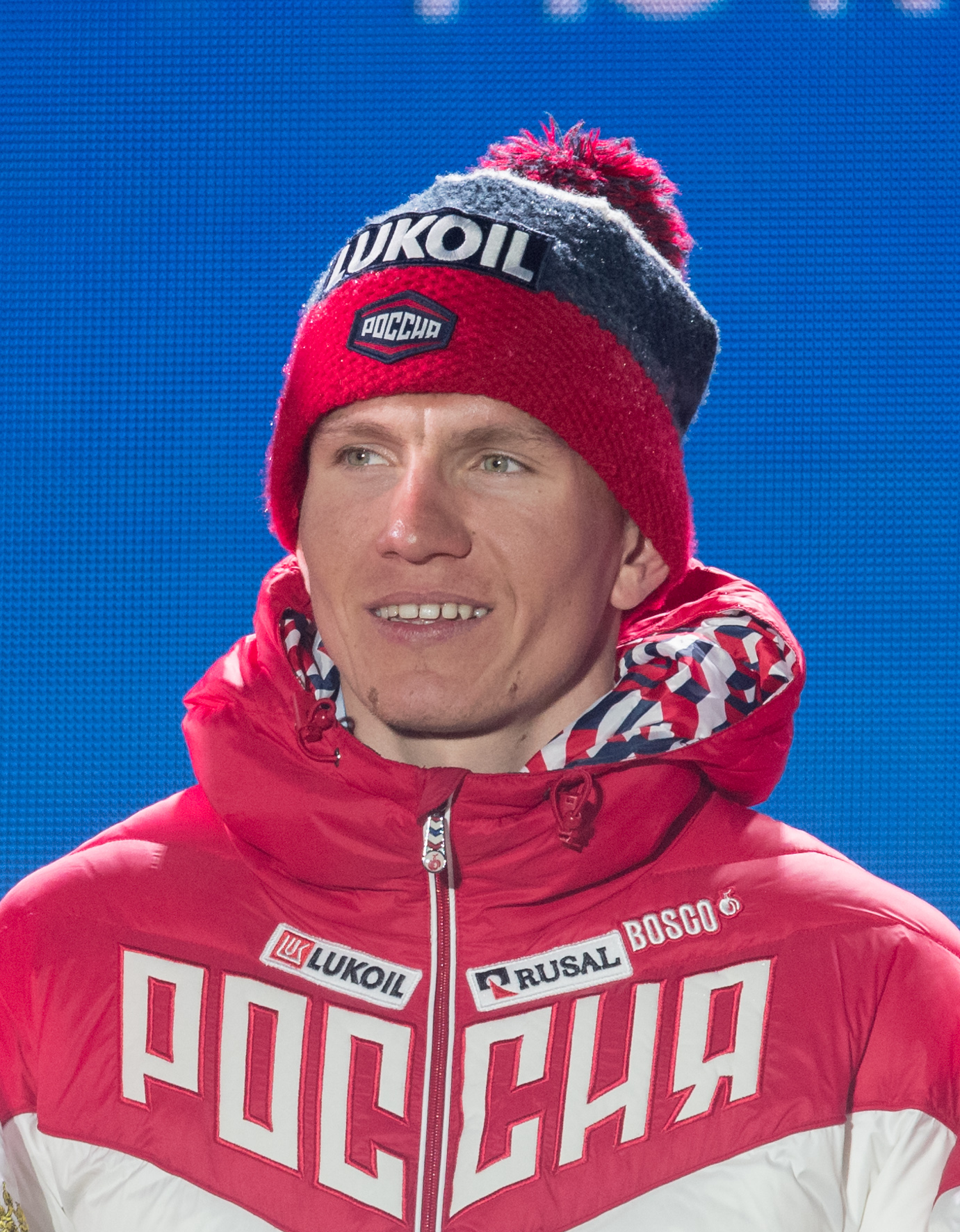
- Bolshunov in 2019

Personal information
- Full name: Alexander Alexandrovich Bolshunov
- Nationality: Russia
- Born: 31 December 1996 (age 29) Podyvotye, Sevsky District, Bryansk Oblast, Russia
- Height: 1.85 m (6 ft 1 in)

Sport
- Sport: Skiing
- Club: SC Vodnik

World Cup career
- Seasons: 6 – (2017–2022)
- Indiv. starts: 110
- Indiv. podiums: 59
- Indiv. wins: 28
- Team starts: 6
- Team podiums: 4
- Team wins: 1
- Overall titles: 2 – (2020, 2021)
- Discipline titles: 3 – (DI in 2019, 2020, 2021)
Medal record
Men's cross-country skiing
International nordic ski competitions
Event	1st	2nd	3rd
Olympic Games	3	4	2
World Championships	1	6	1
Total	4	10	3
Representing ROC
Olympic Games
Gold medal – first place	2022 Beijing	30 km skiathlon
Gold medal – first place	2022 Beijing	50 km freestyle
Gold medal – first place	2022 Beijing	4 × 10 km relay
Silver medal – second place	2022 Beijing	15 km classical
Bronze medal – third place	2022 Beijing	Team sprint
Representing Olympic Athletes from Russia
Olympic Games
Silver medal – second place	2018 Pyeongchang	4 × 10 km relay
Silver medal – second place	2018 Pyeongchang	Team sprint
Silver medal – second place	2018 Pyeongchang	50 km classical
Bronze medal – third place	2018 Pyeongchang	Individual sprint
Representing Russian Ski Federation
World Championships
Gold medal – first place	2021 Oberstdorf	30 km skiathlon
Silver medal – second place	2021 Oberstdorf	50 km classical
Silver medal – second place	2021 Oberstdorf	4 × 10 km relay
Bronze medal – third place	2021 Oberstdorf	Team sprint
Representing Russia
World Championships
Silver medal – second place	2019 Seefeld	30 km skiathlon
Silver medal – second place	2019 Seefeld	50 km freestyle
Silver medal – second place	2019 Seefeld	Team sprint
Silver medal – second place	2019 Seefeld	4 × 10 km relay
U23 World Championships
Gold medal – first place	2017 Park City	15 km freestyle
Gold medal – first place	2017 Park City	30 km skiathlon
Silver medal – second place	2017 Park City	Individual sprint
Junior World Championships
Silver medal – second place	2016 Râșnov	4 × 5 km relay
- Updated on 8 April 2022

Alexander Alexandrovich Bolshunov (Russian: Александр Александрович Большунов, also tr. Aleksandr Aleksandrovich Bolshunov; born 31 December 1996) is a Russian cross-country skier and two-time winner of the 14th and 15th Tour de Ski.

Bolshunov is a nine-time Olympic medalist, three of which are gold, and is also the first male post-Soviet Russian World Cup champion, winning the overall World Cup in 2020 and 2021.

== Career ==
=== 2013–17: Twofold U23 World Champion ===
Bolshunov was born in Podyvotye in the Bryansk Oblast, located just several kilometres from the Russia-Ukraine border. It was there where he started his sports career with his coach and father Alexander Ivanovich Bolshunov. In 2011, his father brought him to the Bryansk sports school for ski-cross skiing, where he was coached by Merited Coach of Russia N. I. Nekhitrov. The first victories on nationals came when on 6 February 2013 Bolshunov took the first place in 10 km classic in a tournament taking place in the Tver Oblast.

On 17 March 2014, Bolshunov won the 20 km skiathlon event at the Russian Junior Nationals, resulting Bolshunov being bestowed the honorary Master of Sports of Russia. After the nationals he was invited to the junior team. A year later, he participated in the sprint event of the FIS Junior World Ski Championships in Almaty, Kazakhstan, but failed to qualify for the sprint final, leaving him without medals. In the following Youth Championships in Rasnov, Romania, his best result was 2nd, in the relay event.

In 2017, Bolshunov took part in the FIS U23 World Ski Championships in the venue Soldier Hollow, Utah, United States, where the 2002 Winter Olympics were held. He won silver in sprint, and a few days later he won the 15 km individual freestyle event. The skiathlon event was marked by a memorable performance by teammates Bolshunov, Alexey Chervotkin and Denis Spitsov, who entered the finish line hand in hand. Bolshunov was declared the winner after video review. As a result, Bolshunov was conferred the highest honorary sports title of Russia, "International Master of Sports".

=== 2017–18: FIS World Cup debut ===
Bolshunov's first major senior tournament in which he competed was the FIS Nordic World Ski Championships 2017 in Lahti, Finland, finishing 26th in sprint and 15th in skiathlon. In the 2016–17 season, he entered his first FIS World Cup stage in Drammen, Norway, in March 2017, finishing 9th. He won his first podium in the next season in the third Stage World Cup in Ruka, Finland, on 26 November, in 15 km freestyle pursuit. In the overall standings of the three Ruka stages, the "Ruka Triple", he was placed third. He showed strong results by the year's end, finishing four times in the third places.

After the 2017–18 Tour de Ski – in the 15 km pursuit stage, he reached the third-place – Bolshunov missed a handful of WC stages to prepare for the 2018 Winter Olympics in Pyeongchang, South Korea. At the Olympics, he rebounded by winning three silver medals and one bronze medal. He won his first Olympic medal in sprint classical, losing only to Johannes Høsflot Klæbo and Federico Pellegrino. Bolshunov then won medals in team sprint freestyle, 4 × 10 km relay and 50 km classical.

=== 2018–19: Distance Cup winner ===
In March, Bolshunov reached second place in a WC stage for the first time in his career in the 15 km classical event in Lahti. He also finished third in a WC stage in Drammen, now in sprint classical. Bolshunov won the World Cup Final by the season's end after winning the 15 km classical mass start and 15 km freestyle pursuit stages. In the overall World Cup standings he was placed 5th.

In the 2018–19 FIS Cross-Country World Cup season, Bolshunov won the first two WC stages in Ruka, in sprint classical and 15 km classical, receiving the yellow bib as a result. Bolshunov led in the overall standings after fifteen stages until being replaced by Johannes Høsflot Klæbo during the Tour de Ski.

Before the World Championships, Bolshunov clinched another stage win in Italian Cogne in 15 km classical. Bolshunov debuted at the World and won four silver medals in 30 km skiathlon, 50 km freestyle mass start, as well as in team sprint and 4 × 10 km relay. On 9 March, he won another stage in 50 km classical mass start in Holmenkollen, returning the yellow bib after Klæbo's poor performance there. As a result, Bolshunov, at age 22, became not only the youngest winner of the marathon stage but also the youngest winner of the Distance Cup, claiming the Small Crystal Globe.

=== 2019–20: Tour de Ski champion, World Cup overall winner ===
Bolshunov started the 2019–20 FIS Cross-Country World Cup by participating in the mini-event 2019 Nordic Opening, where he was positioned fifth in the overall ranking. He won the next stage in Lillehammer for the first time in the 30 km skiathlon classic and freestyle event. Bolshunov entered the 2019–20 Tour de Ski by reaching third place in 15 km mass start freestyle. He reached five out of six podium places in the following stages, only failing in the first sprint stage in Lenzerheide, stopping in the semi-finals. Although he won only one stage and five times finished third, he took the first position in the overall ranking, becoming the third Russian to do so. After this victory, he received the right to wear the yellow bib previously worn by Klæbo. He went on winning three back-to-back long-distance stages, doing so in Nové Město and Oberstdorf.

Before the FIS Ski Tour 2020, Bolshunov finished third in the sprint and first in the 15 km mass start stage, both in Falun. In the inaugural Ski Tour, Bolshunov led in the overall standings after the 5th stage, but in the 6th stage, following an ill-conceived preparation of the skies by the team staff, who hoped the snowfall would stop soon and so decided not to use the no wax anti-ice method, Bolshunov finished 7th. In the same month, in February, Bolshunov took the second position in 15 km classic in Lahti. He finished the season by winning the 50 km classic mass start event in Oslo and went on to win the overall World Cup ahead of schedule after the remaining stages did not take place due to the coronavirus outbreak. He became the first post-Soviet Russian male ski-cross skier to win the World Cup and the first Russian since Soviet Vladimir Smirnov, who won the 1991 edition. Beside that, Bolshunov won his second consecutive Distance Cup title. Due to the pandemic, the ceremony was postponed indefinitely, and the Crystal Globe was presented to the Russian only three months later.

=== 2020–21: Back-to-back Tour de Ski, World Cup overall champion, World Champion ===
Bolshunov started the new season finishing overall second in the Ruka Triple after only Klæbo. Before the 2021 Tour de Ski, he claimed a distance title in Swiss Davos and his first team title in team sprint with Retivykh, in a sprint tournament traditionally taking place in Dresden, Germany, this time without Norwegian, Finnish and Swedish skiers, after their federations decided to quit sending skiers due to concerns over COVID-19. As a result of the withdrawal, Bolshunov was awarded the yellow bib. The Tour de Ski saw a return of Swedish and Finnish, but not Norwegian skiers.

After the first sprint stage, where Bolshunov finished second, the Russian won five consecutive stages, repeating the World Cup tour record of Ustiugov and Dæhlie, but failed to update the record as he came third in the following sprint stage in Val di Fiemme. In the 10 km Final Climb Mass Start stage, he finished 2nd. But this secured him winning the Tour de Ski for a second time, finishing by a record margin of three minutes twenty-three seconds ahead of other skiers. During the final stage of the ski race in Lahti Bolshunov attempted twice to slash Finnish skier Joni Mäki, and towards the finish rammed Mäki and knocked him down, resulting Bolshunov being disqualified. Bolshunov officially apologized for his behaviour after the competition.

Bolshunov participated at the 2021 World Championships, where he won four medals. In the 30 km skiathlon, he got his first gold medal at this event. At the 50 km classical event, Bolshunov initially finished third, but following Klæbo's disqualification, which happened after the Norwegian broke one of Bolshunov's poles, the Russian earned the silver medal at the end. Bolshunov won further medals in team sprint and 4 × 10 kilometre relay. However, he finished fourth in sprint and 15 km freestyle.

== Personal life ==
Since 2017, Bolshunov has been studying at the Penza State University's Faculty of Institute of Physical Education.

On 23 April 2021, Bolshunov married fellow Russian cross-country skier Anna Zherebyateva.

On 10 February 2022, Bolshunov, who was previously senior lieutenant, received the rank of captain by the National Guard of Russia in recognition of his achievements at the 2022 Olympics

On 18 March 2022, Bolshunov participated in the Moscow rally in support of the Russian invasion of Ukraine.

Regarding the 2023 World Championship that Russian athletes were missing due to the invasion of Ukraine, Bolshunov said: "I'm not interested in what's going on at these dirty competitions. We can organize both the World Championships and the Olympic Games better than anyone." He further commented that "There is only one championship, and we have it [the Russian national championship] All other questions - goodbye! I'm not interested in what is happening now at the World Cup and the World Championship. I want to tell you that the whole world is here." He also expressed confidence that Russian athletes will be allowed to compete at the 2026 Winter Olympics: "We will compete at the 2026 Olympics. Everything has its time. Mark my words."

== Cross-country skiing results ==
All results are sourced from the International Ski Federation (FIS).

=== Olympic Games ===
- 9 medals – (3 gold, 4 silver, 2 bronze)

Year	Age	15 km individual	30 km skiathlon	50 km mass start	Sprint	4 × 10 km relay	Team sprint
2018	21	—	—	Silver	Bronze	Silver	Silver
2022	25	Silver	Gold	Gold^{[a]}	DNS	Gold	Bronze

^{a} Distance reduced to 30 km due to weather conditions.

=== World Championships ===
- 8 medals – (1 gold, 6 silver, 1 bronze)

Year	Age	15 km individual	30 km skiathlon	50 km mass start	Sprint	4 × 10 km relay	Team sprint
2017	20	—	15	—	26	—	—
2019	22	8	Silver	Silver	11	Silver	Silver
2021	24	4	Gold	Silver	4	Silver	Bronze

=== World Cup ===
==== Season titles ====
- 5 titles – (2 Overall, 3 Distance)

Season
Season	Discipline
2019	Distance
2020	Overall
2020	Distance
2021	Overall
2021	Distance

==== Season standings ====
Season	Age	Discipline standings				Ski Tour standings			
Season	Age	Overall	Distance	Sprint	U23	Nordic Opening	Tour de Ski	Ski Tour 2020	World Cup Final
2017	20	100	–	49	8	–	–	—N/a	—
2018	21	5	9	6	2nd place, silver medalist(s)	3rd place, bronze medalist(s)	6	—N/a	1st place, gold medalist(s)
2019	22	2nd place, silver medalist(s)	1st place, gold medalist(s)	5	2nd place, silver medalist(s)	5	5	—N/a	3rd place, bronze medalist(s)
2020	23	1st place, gold medalist(s)	1st place, gold medalist(s)	6	—N/a	5	1st place, gold medalist(s)	7	—N/a
2021	24	1st place, gold medalist(s)	1st place, gold medalist(s)	3rd place, bronze medalist(s)	—N/a	2nd place, silver medalist(s)	1st place, gold medalist(s)	—N/a	—N/a
2022 (Note: On 1 March 2022, following the Russian invasion of Ukraine, FIS decided not to allow athletes from Russia and Belarus to take part in FIS competitions, with an immediate effect.)	25	2nd place, silver medalist(s)	2nd place, silver medalist(s)	15	—N/a	—N/a	2nd place, silver medalist(s)	—N/a	—N/a

==== Individual podiums ====
- 28 victories – (20 WC, 8 SWC)
- 59 podiums – (34 WC, 25 SWC)

No.	Season	Date	Location	Race	Level	Place
1	2017–18	24–26 November 2017	(Finland) Nordic Opening	Overall Standings	World Cup	3rd
2	2017–18	2 December 2017	Lillehammer, Norway	1.5 km Sprint C	World Cup	3rd
3	2017–18	9 December 2017	Davos, Switzerland	1.5 km Sprint F	World Cup	3rd
4	2017–18	10 December 2017	Davos, Switzerland	15 km Individual F	World Cup	3rd
5	2017–18	1 January 2018	Lenzerheide, Switzerland	15 km Pursuit F	Stage World Cup	3rd
6	2017–18	4 March 2018	Lahti, Finland	15 km Individual C	World Cup	1st
7	2017–18	7 March 2018	Drammen, Norway	1.2 km Sprint C	World Cup	3rd
8	2017–18	17 March 2018	Falun, Sweden	15 km Mass Start C	Stage World Cup	1st
9	2017–18	16–18 March 2018	(Sweden) World Cup Final	Overall Standings	World Cup	1st
10	2018–19	24 November 2018	Rukatunturi, Finland	1.5 km Sprint C	World Cup	1st
11	2018–19	25 November 2018	Rukatunturi, Finland	15 km Individual C	World Cup	1st
12	2018–19	30 December 2018	Toblach, Italy	15 km Individual F	Stage World Cup	3rd
13	2018–19	3 January 2019	Oberstdorf, Germany	15 km Pursuit F	Stage World Cup	3rd
14	2018–19	5 January 2019	Val di Fiemme, Italy	15 km Mass Start C	Stage World Cup	3rd
15	2018–19	19 January 2019	Otepää, Estonia	1.6 km Sprint C	World Cup	2nd
16	2018–19	20 January 2019	Otepää, Estonia	15 km Individual C	World Cup	2nd
17	2018–19	17 February 2019	Cogne, Italy	15 km Individual C	World Cup	1st
18	2018–19	9 March 2019	Oslo, Norway	50 km Mass Start C	World Cup	1st
19	2018–19	17 March 2019	Falun, Sweden	15 km Individual F	World Cup	1st
20	2018–19	24 March 2019	Quebec City, Canada	15 km Pursuit F	Stage World Cup	2nd
21	2018–19	22–24 March 2019	(Canada) World Cup Final	Overall Standings	World Cup	3rd
22	2019–20	7 December 2019	Lillehammer, Norway	15 km + 15 km Skiathlon C/F	World Cup	1st
23	2019–20	28 December 2019	Lenzerheide, Switzerland	15 km Mass Start F	Stage World Cup	3rd
24	2019–20	31 December 2019	Toblach, Italy	15 km Individual F	Stage World Cup	3rd
25	2019–20	1 January 2020	Toblach, Italy	15 km Pursuit C	Stage World Cup	1st
26	2019–20	3 January 2020	Val di Fiemme, Italy	15 km Mass Start C	Stage World Cup	3rd
27	2019–20	4 January 2020	Val di Fiemme, Italy	1.5 km Sprint C	Stage World Cup	3rd
28	2019–20	5 January 2020	Val di Fiemme, Italy	10 km Mass Start F	Stage World Cup	3rd
29	2019–20	28 December 2019 – 5 January 2020	(Switzerland) (Italy) Tour de Ski	Overall Standings	World Cup	1st
30	2019–20	18 January 2020	Nové Město, Czech Republic	15 km Individual F	World Cup	1st
31	2019–20	19 January 2020	Nové Město, Czech Republic	15 km Pursuit C	World Cup	1st
32	2019–20	25 January 2020	Oberstdorf, Germany	15 km + 15 km Skiathlon C/F	World Cup	1st
33	2019–20	8 February 2020	Falun, Sweden	1.4 km Sprint C	World Cup	3rd
34	2019–20	9 February 2020	Falun, Sweden	15 km Mass Start F	World Cup	1st
35	2019–20	16 February 2020	Östersund, Sweden	15 km Pursuit C	Stage World Cup	2nd
36	2019–20	20 February 2020	Meråker, Norway	34 km Mass Start F	Stage World Cup	1st
37	2019–20	29 February 2020	Lahti, Finland	15 km Individual C	World Cup	2nd
38	2019–20	8 March 2020	Oslo, Norway	50 km Mass Start C	World Cup	1st
39	2020–21	28 November 2020	Rukatunturi, Finland	15 km Individual C	Stage World Cup	3rd
40	2020–21	27–29 November 2020	(Finland) Nordic Opening	Overall Standings	World Cup	2nd
41	2020–21	12 December 2020	Davos, Switzerland	1.5 km Sprint F	World Cup	2nd
42	2020–21	13 December 2020	Davos, Switzerland	15 km Individual F	World Cup	1st
43	2020–21	1 January 2021	Val Müstair, Switzerland	1.4 km Sprint F	Stage World Cup	2nd
44	2020–21	2 January 2021	Val Müstair, Switzerland	15 km Mass Start C	Stage World Cup	1st
45	2020–21	3 January 2021	Val Müstair, Switzerland	15 km Pursuit F	Stage World Cup	1st
46	2020–21	5 January 2021	Toblach, Italy	15 km Individual F	Stage World Cup	1st
47	2020–21	6 January 2021	Toblach, Italy	15 km Pursuit C	Stage World Cup	1st
48	2020–21	8 January 2021	Val di Fiemme, Italy	15 km Mass Start C	Stage World Cup	1st
49	2020–21	9 January 2021	Val di Fiemme, Italy	1.5 km Sprint C	Stage World Cup	3rd
50	2020–21	10 January 2020	Val di Fiemme, Italy	10 km Mass Start F	Stage World Cup	2nd
51	2020–21	1–10 January 2021	(Switzerland) (Italy) Tour de Ski	Overall Standings	World Cup	1st
52	2020–21	29 January 2021	Falun, Sweden	15 km Individual F	World Cup	1st
53	2020–21	30 January 2021	Falun, Sweden	15 km Mass Start C	World Cup	1st
54	2020–21	13 March 2021	Engadin, Switzerland	15 km Mass Start C	World Cup	1st
55	2021–22	27 November 2021	Rukatunturi, Finland	15 km Individual C	World Cup	3rd
56	2021–22	28 November 2021	Rukatunturi, Finland	15 km Pursuit F	World Cup	1st
57	2021–22	29 December 2021	Lenzerheide, Switzerland	15 km Individual C	Stage World Cup	2nd
58	2021–22	31 December 2021	Oberstdorf, Germany	15 km Mass Start F	Stage World Cup	2nd
59	2021–22	28 December 2021 – 4 January 2022	(Switzerland) (Germany) (Italy) Tour de Ski	Overall Standings	World Cup	2nd

==== Team podiums ====
- 1 victory – (1 TS)
- 4 podiums – (3 RL, 2 TS)

No.	Season	Date	Location	Race	Level	Place	Teammates
1	2018–19	9 December 2018	Beitostølen, Norway	4 × 7.5 km Relay C/F	World Cup	2nd	Belov / Spitsov / Melnichenko
2	2018–19	27 January 2019	Ulricehamn, Sweden	4 × 7.5 km Relay C/F	World Cup	2nd	Larkov / Melnichenko / Ustiugov
3	2020–21	20 December 2020	Dresden, Germany	12 × 0.65 km Team Sprint F	World Cup	1st	Retivykh
4	2021–22	19 December 2021	Dresden, Germany	12 × 0.65 km Team Sprint F	World Cup	3rd	Retivykh
