= Helene Marie Fossesholm =

Norwegian cross-country skier

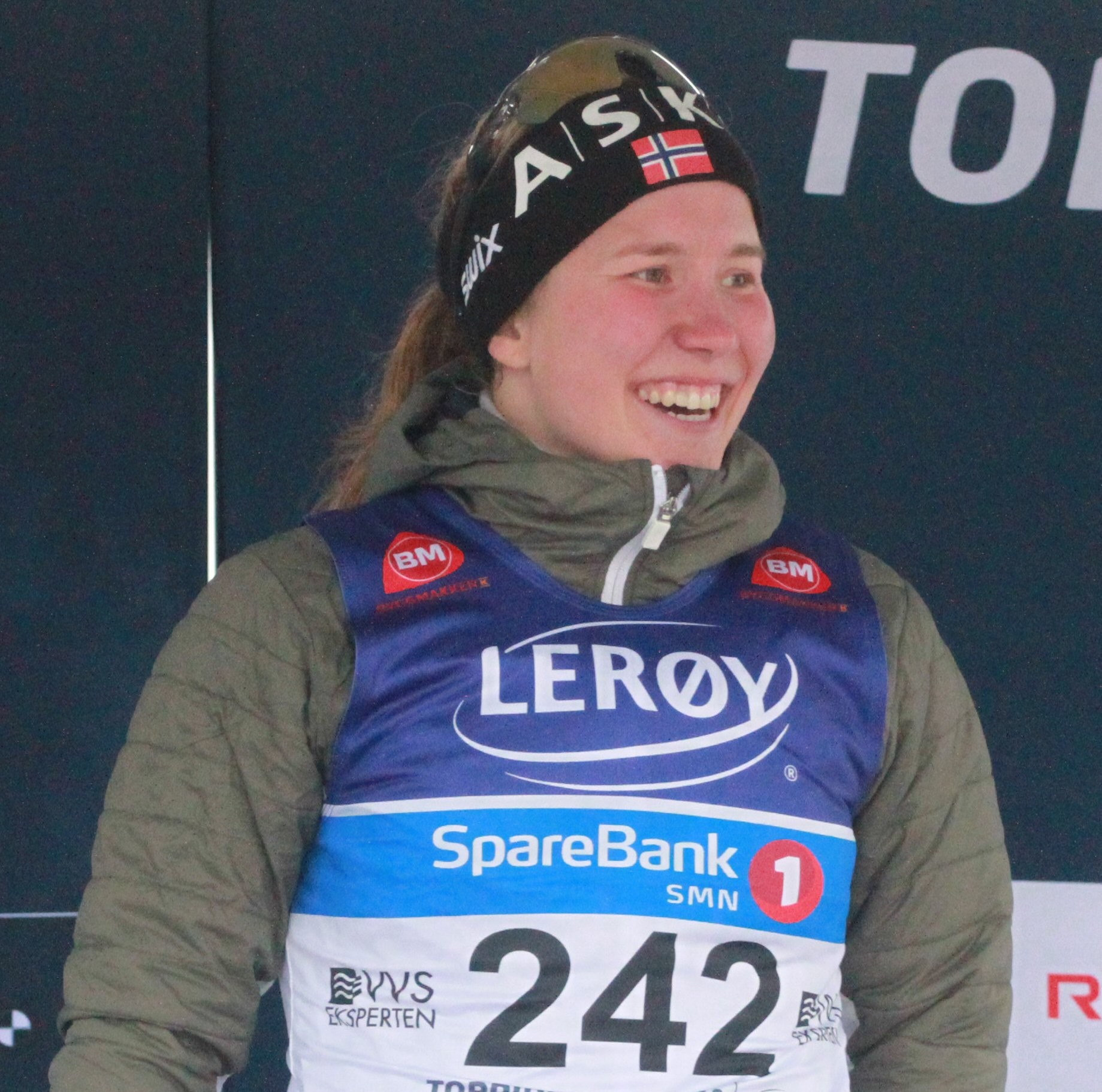
- Johaug with the gold medal for her victory in the 10 km at the 2019 World Championships in Seefeld

Personal information
- Nationality: Norway
- Born: 31 May 2001 (age 25) Vestfossen, Norway

Sport
- Sport: Skiing
- Club: Eiker Skiklubb

World Cup career
- Seasons: 4 – (2020–present)
- Indiv. starts: 23
- Indiv. podiums: 2
- Indiv. wins: 0
- Team starts: 3
- Team podiums: 2
- Team wins: 1
- Overall titles: 0 – (15th in 2021)
- Discipline titles: 0
Medal record
Women's cross-country skiing
Representing Norway
World Championships
Gold medal – first place	2021 Oberstdorf	4 × 5 km relay
Junior World Championships
Gold medal – first place	2019 Lahti	4 × 3.33 km relay
Gold medal – first place	2020 Oberwiesenthal	5 km classical
Gold medal – first place	2020 Oberwiesenthal	15 km freestyle
Silver medal – second place	2019 Lahti	5 km freestyle
Silver medal – second place	2019 Lahti	15 km classical
Women's mountain bike racing
Junior World Championships
Bronze medal – third place	2019 Mont-Sainte-Anne	Cross-country
- Updated on 27 March 2023

Helene Marie Fossesholm (born 31 May 2001) is a former Norwegian cross-country skier who competes for Eiker Skiklubb. She has won a total of three gold medals at the FIS Nordic Junior World Ski Championships, and won her first podium in the World Cup, finishing second in Rukatunturi, Finland, in November 2020. Besides skiing she has also competed in mountain bike racing and has a bronze medal from the junior cross-country race at the 2019 UCI Mountain Bike World Championships.

== Cross-country skiing results ==
All results are sourced from the International Ski Federation (FIS).

=== Olympic Games ===
Year	Age	10 km individual	15 km skiathlon	30 km mass start	Sprint	4 × 5 km relay	Team sprint
2022	20	—	18	—	—	5	—

=== World Championships ===
- 1 medal – (1 gold)

Year	Age	10 km individual	15 km skiathlon	30 km mass start	Sprint	4 × 5 km relay	Team sprint
2021	19	8	18	25	—	Gold	—

=== World Cup ===
==== Season standings ====
Season	Age	Discipline standings				Ski Tour standings		
Season	Age	Overall	Distance	Sprint	U23	Nordic Opening	Tour de Ski	Ski Tour 2020
2020	18	58	37	—	10	—	—	—
2021	19	15	9	NC	2nd place, silver medalist(s)	6	—	—N/a
2022	20	41	22	65	2nd place, silver medalist(s)	—N/a	DNF	—N/a
2023	21	60	33	—	6	—N/a	—	—N/a

==== Individual podiums ====
- 2 podiums – (1 WC, 1 SWC)

No.	Season	Date	Location	Race	Level	Place
1	2020–21	13 December 2020	Rukatunturi, Finland	10 km Pursuit F	World Cup	2nd
2	2020–21	23 January 2021	Lahti, Finland	7.5 km + 7.5 km Skiathlon C/F	World Cup	2nd

==== Team podiums ====
- 1 victory – (1 RL)
- 2 podiums – (2 RL)

No.	Season	Date	Location	Race	Level	Place	Teammates
1	2020–21	24 January 2021	Lahti, Finland	4 × 5 km Relay C/F	World Cup	1st	T. Udnes Weng / Johaug / Weng
2	2021–22	5 December 2021	Lillehammer, Norway	4 × 5 km Relay C/F	World Cup	3rd	T. Udnes Weng / Weng / Johaug
