= Gleb Retivykh =

Russian cross-country skier

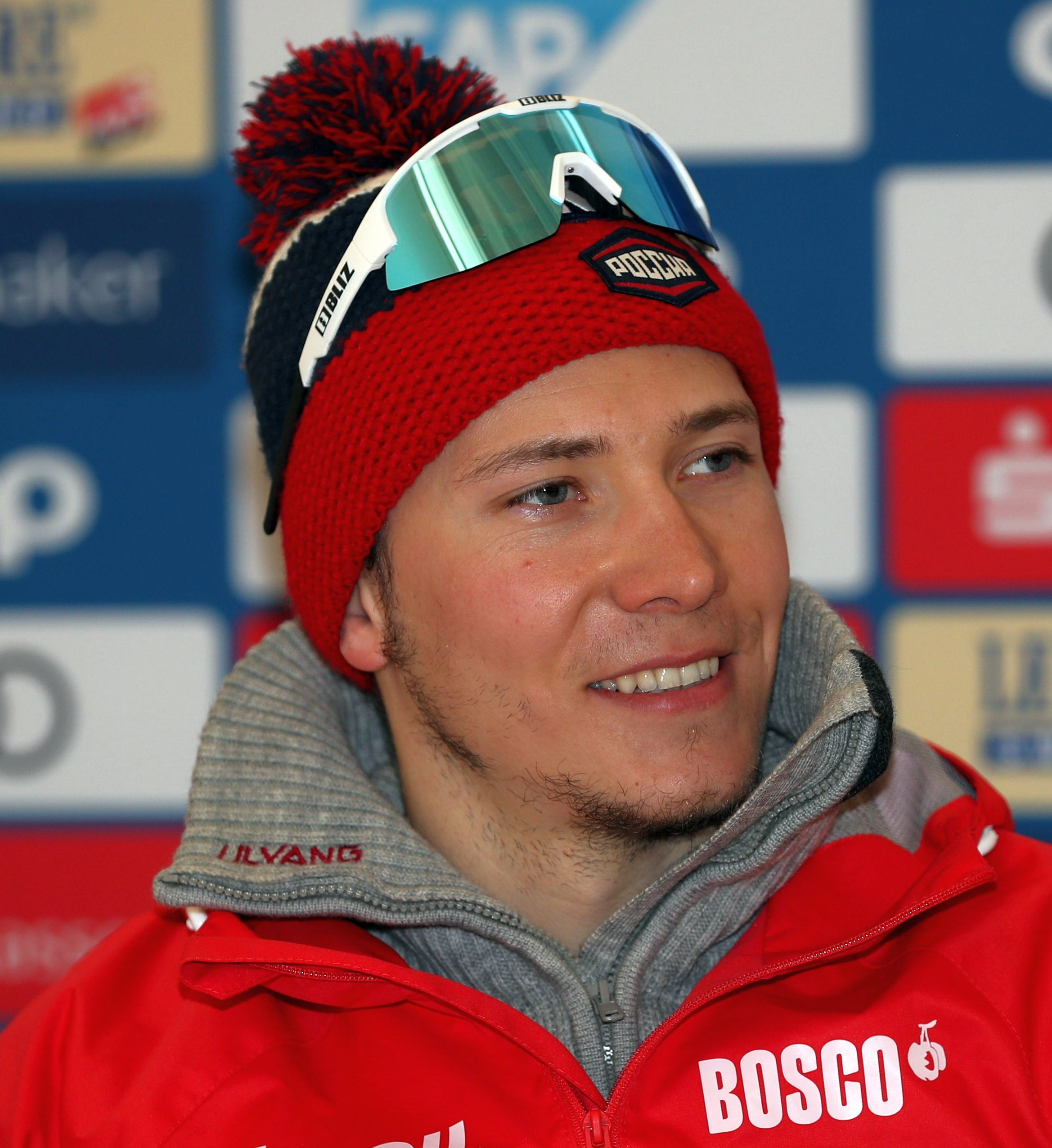
- Gleb Retivykh in Dresden, 2019

Personal information
- Nationality: Russia
- Born: 30 December 1991 (age 34) Chaykovsky, Russia
- Height: 1.87 m (6 ft 2 in)

Sport
- Sport: Skiing

World Cup career
- Seasons: 12 – (2011–2022)
- Indiv. starts: 128
- Indiv. podiums: 6
- Indiv. wins: 1
- Team starts: 15
- Team podiums: 6
- Team wins: 2
- Overall titles: 0 – (17th in 2021)
- Discipline titles: 0
Medal record
Men's cross-country skiing
Representing Russia
World Championships
Silver medal – second place	2019 Seefeld	Team sprint
Bronze medal – third place	2019 Seefeld	Individual sprint
U23 World Championships
Gold medal – first place	2012 Erzurum	Individual sprint
Junior World Championships
Silver medal – second place	2010 Hinterzarten	4 × 5 km relay
Silver medal – second place	2011 Otepää	4 × 5 km relay
Bronze medal – third place	2011 Otepää	Individual sprint
Representing Russian Ski Federation
World Championships
Bronze medal – third place	2021 Oberstdorf	Team sprint
- Updated on 23 March 2023

Gleb Sergeyevich Retivykh (Russian: Глеб Сергеевич Ретивых; born 30 December 1991) is a Russian cross-country skier specializing in sprint.

On 3 February 2017, Retivykh won his first World Cup title in Pyeongchang, South Korea, in classic sprint. Three days later, he also won the team sprint with Andrey Parfenov.

He competed at the FIS Nordic World Ski Championships 2017 in Lahti, Finland.

== Cross-country skiing results ==
All results are sourced from the International Ski Federation (FIS).

=== World Championships ===
- 3 medals – (1 silver, 2 bronze)

Year	Age	15 km individual	30 km skiathlon	50 km mass start	Sprint	4 × 10 km relay	Team sprint
2017	25	—	—	—	15	—	—
2019	27	—	—	—	Bronze	—	Silver
2021	29	—	—	—	9	—	Bronze

=== World Cup ===
==== Season standings ====
Season	Age	Discipline standings			Ski Tour standings				
Season	Age	Overall	Distance	Sprint	Nordic Opening	Tour de Ski	Ski Tour 2020	World Cup Final	Ski Tour Canada
2011	19	89	—	47	—	—	—N/a	—	—N/a
2012	20	43	NC	14	—	—	—N/a	44	—N/a
2013	21	58	NC	24	DNF	—	—N/a	—	—N/a
2014	22	114	—	60	—	—	—N/a	—	—N/a
2015	23	96	NC	45	—	—	—N/a	—N/a	—N/a
2016	24	63	—	28	—	—	—N/a	—N/a	—
2017	25	32	—	11	—	—	—N/a	—	—N/a
2018	26	30	98	7	72	41	—N/a	66	—N/a
2019	27	24	NC	7	55	—	—N/a	—	—N/a
2020	28	26	NC	7	60	44	52	—N/a	—N/a
2021	29	17	NC	2nd place, silver medalist(s)	47	46	—N/a	—N/a	—N/a
2022 (Note: On 1 March 2022, following the 2022 Russian invasion of Ukraine, FIS decided to not allow athletes from Russian and Belarus to take part in FIS competitions, with an immediate effect.)	30	28	NC	9	—N/a	41	—N/a	—N/a	—N/a

==== Individual podiums ====
- 1 victory – (1 WC)
- 6 podiums – (5 WC, 1 SWC)

No.	Season	Date	Location	Race	Level	Place
1	2016–17	3 February 2017	Pyeongchang, South Korea	1.5 km Sprint C	World Cup	1st
2	2017–18	3 March 2018	Lahti, Finland	1.6 km Sprint F	World Cup	2nd
3	2018–19	12 January 2019	Dresden, Germany	1.6 km Sprint F	World Cup	2nd
4	2020–21	19 December 2020	Dresden, Germany	1.3 km Sprint F	World Cup	3rd
5	2020–21	9 January 2021	Val di Fiemme, Italy	1.5 km Sprint C	Stage World Cup	2nd
6	2020–21	6 February 2021	Ulricehamn, Sweden	1.5 km Sprint F	World Cup	2nd

==== Team podiums ====
- 2 victories – (2 TS)
- 6 podiums – (6 TS)

No.	Season	Date	Location	Race	Level	Place	Teammate
1	2016–17	5 February 2017	Pyeongchang, South Korea	6 × 1.5 km Team Sprint F	World Cup	1st	Parfenov
2	2017–18	14 January 2018	Dresden, Germany	6 × 1.3 km Team Sprint F	World Cup	3rd	Krasnov
3	2018–19	13 January 2019	Dresden, Germany	6 × 1.6 km Team Sprint F	World Cup	3rd	Maltsev
4	2019–20	12 January 2020	Dresden, Germany	12 × 0.65 km Team Sprint F	World Cup	3rd	Krasnov
5	2020–21	20 December 2020	Dresden, Germany	12 × 0.65 km Team Sprint F	World Cup	1st	Bolshunov
6	2021–22	19 December 2021	Dresden, Germany	12 × 0.65 km Team Sprint F	World Cup	3rd	Bolshunov
