= FIS Nordic World Ski Championships 2019 – Men's team sprint =

Men's team sprint at the FIS Nordic World Ski Championships 2019
- Location: Seefeld in Tirol, Austria
- Dates: 24 February
- Competitors: 58 from 29 nations
- Teams: 29
- Winning time: 18:49.86

Medalists
gold medal	Emil Iversen; Johannes Høsflot Klæbo	Norway
silver medal	Gleb Retivykh; Alexander Bolshunov	Russia
bronze medal	Francesco De Fabiani; Federico Pellegrino	Italy

The Men's team sprint competition at the FIS Nordic World Ski Championships 2019 was held on 24 February 2019.

== Results ==
=== Semifinals ===
The semifinals were started at 10:15. The first two teams of each semifinals and the next six best timed teams advanced to the final.

==== Semifinal A ====
Rank	Bib	Country	Athletes	Time	Deficit	Notes
1	1	Norway	Emil Iversen; Johannes Høsflot Klæbo	19:10.80		Q
2	3	Russia	Gleb Retivykh; Alexander Bolshunov	19:12.18	+1.38	Q
3	2	Sweden	Oskar Svensson; Calle Halfvarsson	19:13.22	+2.42	q
4	4	United States	Simi Hamilton; Erik Bjornsen	19:13.39	+2.59	q
5	8	Canada	Evan Palmer-Charrette; Len Väljas	19:21.14	+10.34	q
6	5	Austria	Max Hauke; Dominik Baldauf	19:21.84	+11.04	q
7	6	Great Britain	Andrew Young; James Clugnet	19:30.52	+19.72	
8	9	Kazakhstan	Nikolay Chebotko; Denis Volotka	19:36.57	+25.77	
9	7	Czech Republic	Miroslav Rypl; Michal Novák	19:37.03	+26.23	
10	10	Romania	Raul Mihai Popa; Petrică Hogiu	21:04.55	+1:53.75	
11	11	Slovakia	Andrej Segeč; Ján Koristek	21:10.80	+2:00.00	
12	14	Belgium	Titouan Serot; Thibaut De Marre	21:24.14	+2:13.34	
13	12	Lithuania	Mantas Strolia; Tautvydas Strolia	21:46.39	+2:35.59	
14	13	Ireland	Thomas Hjalmar Westgård; Jan Rossiter	22:10.88	+3:00.08	
15	15	Denmark	Tue Rømer; Joachim Weel Rosbo	Lapped		

==== Semifinal B ====
Rank	Bib	Country	Athletes	Time	Deficit	Notes
1	17	Finland	Iivo Niskanen; Ristomatti Hakola	19:14.62		Q
2	18	France	Richard Jouve; Lucas Chanavat	19:14.68	+0.06	Q
3	16	Italy	Francesco De Fabiani; Federico Pellegrino	19:15.35	+0.73	q
4	24	Slovenia	Miha Šimenc; Janez Lampič	19:27.60	+12.98	q
5	20	Switzerland	Ueli Schnider; Jovian Hediger	19:32.10	+17.48	
6	23	Estonia	Raido Ränkel; Marko Kilp	19:43.80	+29.18	
7	19	Germany	Janosch Brugger; Sebastian Eisenlauer	19:47.90	+33.28	
8	22	Belarus	Yury Astapenka; Aliaksandr Voranau	20:20.96	+1:06.34	
9	21	Poland	Dominik Bury; Maciej Staręga	20:23.58	+1:08.96	
10	25	Ukraine	Yan Kostruba; Oleksiy Krasovsky	20:43.11	+1:28.49	
11	26	China	Wang Qiang; Zhu Mingliang	21:01.64	+1:47.02	
12	27	Liechtenstein	Martin Vögeli; Michael Biedermann	21:37.87	+2:23.25	
13	28	Turkey	Hamza Dursun; Yusuf Emre Fırat	22:02.65	+2:48.03	
14	29	Croatia	Marko Skender; Edi Dadić	22:40.76	+3:26.14	

=== Final ===
The final was started at 12:00.

Rank	Bib	Country	Athletes	Time	Deficit
1st place, gold medalist(s)	1	Norway	Emil Iversen; Johannes Høsflot Klæbo	18:49.86	
2nd place, silver medalist(s)	3	Russia	Gleb Retivykh; Alexander Bolshunov	18:51.74	+1.88
3rd place, bronze medalist(s)	16	Italy	Francesco De Fabiani; Federico Pellegrino	18:53.89	+4.03
4	2	Sweden	Oskar Svensson; Calle Halfvarsson	18:54.59	+4.73
5	18	France	Richard Jouve; Lucas Chanavat	18:58.99	+9.13
6	5	Austria	Max Hauke; Dominik Baldauf	19:13.70	+23.84
7	17	Finland	Iivo Niskanen; Ristomatti Hakola	19:17.38	+27.52
8	4	United States	Simi Hamilton; Erik Bjornsen	19:18.42	+28.56
9	24	Slovenia	Miha Šimenc; Janez Lampič	20:11.63	+1:21.77
10	8	Canada	Evan Palmer-Charrette; Len Väljas	20:30.85	+1:40.99
