= FIS Nordic World Ski Championships 2021 =

- Host city: Oberstdorf
- Country: Germany
- Events: 24
- Opening: 24 February 2021
- Closing: 7 March 2021

The 42nd FIS Nordic World Ski Championships were held from 24 February to 7 March 2021 in Oberstdorf, Germany. It was the third time that the World Championships have been held in Oberstdorf, having previously hosted the event in 1987 and 2005.

== Russia doping ban ==
On 9 December 2019, the World Anti-Doping Agency (WADA) banned Russia from all international sport for a period of four years, after the Russian government was found to have tampered with laboratory data that it provided to WADA in January 2019 as a condition of the Russian Anti-Doping Agency being reinstated. As a result of the ban, WADA plans to allow individually cleared Russian athletes to take part in the 2021–2022 World Championships and 2022 Winter Olympics under a neutral banner, as instigated at the 2018 Winter Olympics, but they will not be permitted to compete in team sports. The title of the neutral banner has yet to be determined; WADA Compliance Review Committee head Jonathan Taylor stated that the IOC would not be able to use "Olympic Athletes from Russia" (OAR) as it did in 2018, emphasizing that neutral athletes cannot be portrayed as representing a specific country. Russia later filed an appeal to the Court of Arbitration for Sport (CAS) against the WADA decision. The Court of Arbitration for Sport, on review of Russia's appeal of its case from WADA, ruled on 17 December 2020 to reduce the penalty that WADA had placed. Instead of banning Russia from sporting events, the ruling allowed Russia to participate at the Olympics and other international events, but for a period of two years, the team cannot use the Russian name, flag, or anthem and must present themselves as "Neutral Athlete" or "Neutral Team". The ruling does allow for team uniforms to display "Russia" on the uniform as well as the use of the Russian flag colors within the uniform's design, although the name should be up to equal predominance as the "Neutral Athlete/Team" designation.

== Schedule ==
All times are local (UTC+1).

Cross-country

Date	Time	Event
24 February	09:00	Women's 5 km freestyle qualification
24 February	10:30	Men's 10 km freestyle qualification
25 February	11:30	Women's sprint
25 February	11:30	Men's sprint
27 February	11:45	Women's 2 × 7.5 km skiathlon
27 February	13:30	Men's 2 × 15 km skiathlon
28 February	13:00	Women's team sprint
28 February	13:00	Men's team sprint
2 March	13:15	Women's 10 km freestyle
3 March	13:15	Men's 15 km freestyle
4 March	13:15	Women's 4 × 5 km relay
5 March	13:15	Men's 4 × 10 km relay
6 March	12:30	Women's 30 km classical
7 March	13:00	Men's 50 km classical

Nordic combined

Date	Time	Event
26 February	10:15/16:00	Men's HS106 / 10 km
27 February	10:00/15:30	Women's HS106 / 5 km
28 February	10:00/15:00	Men's team HS106 / 4 × 5 km
4 March	11:00/15:15	Men's HS137 / 10 km
6 March	10:00/15:00	Men's team sprint HS137 / 2 × 7.5 km

Ski jumping

Date	Time	Event
24 February	18:00	Women's HS106 qualification
25 February	17:00	Women's HS106
26 February	17:15	Women's team HS106
26 February	20:30	Men's HS106 qualification
27 February	16:30	Men's HS106
28 February	17:00	Team mixed HS106
2 March	18:00	Women's HS137 qualification
3 March	17:15	Women's HS137
4 March	17:30	Men's HS137 qualification
5 March	17:00	Men's HS137
6 March	17:00	Men's team HS137

== Medal summary ==
=== Medal table ===
* Host nation (Germany)

Rank	Nation	Gold	Silver	Bronze	Total
1	Norway	13	11	7	31
2	Austria	4	1	2	7
3	Sweden	2	2	3	7
4	Germany*	2	2	2	6
5	Russian Ski Federation	1	3	1	5
6	Slovenia	1	1	4	6
7	Poland	1	0	1	2
8	Finland	0	2	1	3
9	Japan	0	1	2	3
10	Switzerland	0	1	0	1
11	France	0	0	1	1
Totals (11 entries)		24	24	24	72

=== Cross-country skiing ===
==== Men ====
Event	Gold		Silver		Bronze	
Sprint classical	Johannes Høsflot Klæbo; Norway	3:01.30	Erik Valnes; Norway	3:01.96	Håvard Solås Taugbøl; Norway	3:02.10
30 kilometre skiathlon	Alexander Bolshunov; Russian Ski Federation	1:11:33.9	Simen Hegstad Krüger; Norway	1:11:35.0	Hans Christer Holund; Norway	1:11:35.6
Team sprint freestyle	Norway; Erik Valnes; Johannes Høsflot Klæbo	15:01.74	Finland; Ristomatti Hakola; Joni Mäki	15:03.42	Russian Ski Federation; Alexander Bolshunov; Gleb Retivykh	15:03.83
15 kilometre freestyle individual	Hans Christer Holund; Norway	33:48.7	Simen Hegstad Krüger; Norway	34:08.9	Harald Østberg Amundsen; Norway	34:24.3
4 × 10 kilometre relay	Norway; Pål Golberg; Emil Iversen; Hans Christer Holund; Johannes Høsflot Klæbo	1:52:39.0	Russian Ski Federation; Aleksey Chervotkin; Ivan Yakimushkin; Artem Maltsev; Alexander Bolshunov	1:52:51.0	France; Hugo Lapalus; Maurice Manificat; Clément Parisse; Jules Lapierre	1:53:51.6
50 kilometre classical mass start	Emil Iversen; Norway	2:10:52.9	Alexander Bolshunov; Russian Ski Federation	2:10:53.6	Simen Hegstad Krüger; Norway	2:11:01.1

==== Women ====
Event	Gold		Silver		Bronze	
Sprint classical	Jonna Sundling; Sweden	2:36.76	Maiken Caspersen Falla; Norway	2:39.08	Anamarija Lampič; Slovenia	2:39.11
15 kilometre skiathlon	Therese Johaug; Norway	38:35.5	Frida Karlsson; Sweden	39:05.5	Ebba Andersson; Sweden	39.05.7
Team sprint freestyle	Sweden; Maja Dahlqvist; Jonna Sundling	16:27.94	Switzerland; Laurien van der Graaff; Nadine Fähndrich	16:28.89	Slovenia; Eva Urevc; Anamarija Lampič	16:31.40
10 kilometre freestyle individual	Therese Johaug; Norway	23:09.8	Frida Karlsson; Sweden	24:04.0	Ebba Andersson; Sweden	24:16.7
4 × 5 kilometre relay	Norway; Tiril Udnes Weng; Heidi Weng; Therese Johaug; Helene Marie Fossesholm	53:43.2	Russian Ski Federation; Yana Kirpichenko; Yuliya Stupak; Tatiana Sorina; Natalya Nepryayeva	54:09.8	Finland; Jasmi Joensuu; Johanna Matintalo; Riitta-Liisa Roponen; Krista Pärmäkoski	54:29.4
30 kilometre classical mass start	Therese Johaug; Norway	1:24:56.3	Heidi Weng; Norway	1:27:30.5	Frida Karlsson; Sweden	1:27:31.1

=== Nordic combined ===
==== Men ====
Event	Gold		Silver		Bronze	
Individual large hill/10 km	Johannes Lamparter; Austria	23:11.1	Jarl Magnus Riiber; Norway	23:48.2	Akito Watabe; Japan	23:56.9
Team normal hill/4 × 5 km	Norway; Espen Bjørnstad; Jørgen Graabak; Jens Lurås Oftebro; Jarl Magnus Riiber	43:57.7	Germany; Terence Weber; Fabian Rießle; Eric Frenzel; Vinzenz Geiger	44:40.4	Austria; Johannes Lamparter; Lukas Klapfer; Mario Seidl; Lukas Greiderer	44:46.8
Individual normal hill/10 km	Jarl Magnus Riiber; Norway	23:01.2	Ilkka Herola; Finland	23:01.6	Jens Lurås Oftebro; Norway	23:02.1
Team sprint large hill/2 × 7,5 km	Austria; Johannes Lamparter; Lukas Greiderer	29:29.7	Norway; Espen Andersen; Jarl Magnus Riiber	30:09.3	Germany; Fabian Rießle; Eric Frenzel	30:37.1

==== Women ====
Event	Gold		Silver		Bronze	
Individual normal hill/5 km	Gyda Westvold Hansen; Norway	13:10.4	Mari Leinan Lund; Norway	13:24.2	Marte Leinan Lund; Norway	13:39.2

=== Ski jumping ===
==== Men ====
Event	Gold		Silver		Bronze	
Men's individual normal hill	Piotr Żyła; Poland	268.8	Karl Geiger; Germany	265.2	Anže Lanišek; Slovenia	261.5
Men's individual large hill	Stefan Kraft; Austria	276.5	Robert Johansson; Norway	272.1	Karl Geiger; Germany	267.4
Men's team large hill	Germany; Pius Paschke; Severin Freund; Markus Eisenbichler; Karl Geiger	1046.6	Austria; Philipp Aschenwald; Jan Hörl; Daniel Huber; Stefan Kraft	1035.5	Poland; Piotr Żyła; Andrzej Stękała; Kamil Stoch; Dawid Kubacki	1031.2

==== Women ====
Event	Gold		Silver		Bronze	
Women's individual normal hill	Ema Klinec; Slovenia	279.6	Maren Lundby; Norway	276.5	Sara Takanashi; Japan	276.3
Women's individual large hill	Maren Lundby; Norway	296.6	Sara Takanashi; Japan	287.9	Nika Križnar; Slovenia	287.1
Women's team normal hill	Austria; Daniela Iraschko-Stolz; Sophie Sorschag; Chiara Hölzl; Marita Kramer	959.3	Slovenia; Nika Križnar; Špela Rogelj; Urša Bogataj; Ema Klinec	957.9	Norway; Silje Opseth; Anna Odine Strøm; Thea Minyan Bjørseth; Maren Lundby	942.1

==== Mixed ====
Event	Gold		Silver		Bronze	
Mixed team normal hill	Germany; Katharina Althaus; Markus Eisenbichler; Anna Rupprecht; Karl Geiger	1000.8	Norway; Silje Opseth; Robert Johansson; Maren Lundby; Halvor Egner Granerud	995.6	Austria; Marita Kramer; Michael Hayböck; Daniela Iraschko-Stolz; Stefan Kraft	986.5
