= Cross-country skiing at the Winter World University Games =

- Events: 10 (men: 5; women: 5)

Games
- 1959; 1960; 1961; 1962; 1963; 1964; 1965; 1966; 1967; 1968; 1970; 1970; 1973; 1972; 1975; 1975; 1977; 1978; 1979; 1981; 1983; 1985; 1987; 1989; 1991; 1993; 1995; 1997; 1999; 2001; 2003; 2005; 2007; 2009; 2011; 2013; 2015; 2017; 2019; 2023; 2025

Cross-country events have been contested at the Universiade since 1960.

== Events ==
Event	60	62	64	66	68	70	72	75	78	81	83	85	87	89	91	93	95	97	99	01	03	05	07	09	11	13	15	17	19	Years
Men's sprint																					•	•	•	•	•	•	•	•	•	9
Men's 10 km classical																			•	•	•				•		•	•	•	7
Men's 10 km freestyle																				•		•	•	•		•				5
Men's 10 km pursuit																												•	•	2
Men's 12 km classical		•		•																										2
Men's 15 km classical			•		•	•	•	•	•	•	•	•	•	•	•	•	•	•												15
Men's 15 km combined							•									•														2
Men's 15 km pursuit																			•				•	•	•					4
Men's 15 km skiathlon																										•				1
Men's 30 km classical							•	•	•	•	•	•	•	•	•							•		•		•		•		13
Men's 30 km freestyle															•	•	•	•	•		•		•		•		•		•	10
Men's relay	•		•	•	•	•	•	•	•	•	•	•	•	•	•	•	•	•	•	•	•	•	•	•	•	•	•	•	•	28
Women's sprint																					•	•	•	•	•	•	•	•	•	9
Women's 5 km classical			•				•	•	•	•	•	•	•	•	•				•	•	•				•		•	•	•	17
Women's 5 km freestyle																				•		•	•	•		•				5
Women's 5 km pursuit																												•	•	2
Women's 8 km classical				•																										1
Women's 10 km classical					•	•	•	•	•	•	•	•	•	•	•	•	•	•												14
Women's 10 km combined															•	•														2
Women's 10 km pursuit																			•				•	•	•				•	5
Women's 10 km skiathlon																										•				1
Women's 15 km classical																						•		•		•		•		4
Women's 15 km freestyle															•	•	•	•	•		•		•		•		•		•	10
Women's relay	•		•	•	•	•	•	•	•	•	•	•	•	•	•	•	•	•	•	•	•	•	•	•	•	•	•	•	•	28
Mixed team																									•	•	•	•	•	5

== Medalists ==
=== Men ===
==== Individual sprint ====
Year	Gold	Silver	Bronze
1960-2001	not included in the program		
Freestyle
2003	(Kazakhstan) Nikolay Chebotko	(Italy) Loris Frasnelli	(Japan) Yuichi Onda
2005	(Kazakhstan) Yevgeniy Koshevoy	(Slovenia) Nejc Brodar	(Italy) Fulvio Scola
2007	(Kazakhstan) Nikolay Chebotko	(Czech Republic) Ales Razym	(Italy) Fulvio Scola
2009	(Russia) Egor Sorin	(Japan) Nobuhito Kashiwabara	(Russia) Konstantin Glavatskikh
2011	(Russia) Radik Gaziev	(France) Baptiste Gros	(Kazakhstan) Denis Volotka
Classical
2013	(Russia) Maxim Kovalev	(Russia) Pavel Siulatov	(Finland) Heikki Sakari Korpela
Freestyle
2015	(Russia) Andrey Larkov	(Russia) Anton Gafarov	(Russia) Raul Shakirzianov
Classical
2017	(Kazakhstan) Ivan Lyuft	(Russia) Vladimir Frolov	(Russia) Egor Berezin
Freestyle
2019	(Russia) Alexander Terentev	(Kazakhstan) Asset Dyussenov	(Russia) Andrey Sobakarev
Freestyle
2023	(Finland) Verneri Poikonen	(Spain) Jaume Pueyo	(France) Tom Mancini
Freestyle
2025	(Switzerland) Nolan Gertsch	(Finland) Valteri Pennannen	(Finland) Marcus Kasanen

==== 10 km ====
Year	Gold	Silver	Bronze
1960-1997	not included in the program		
Classical
1999	(Austria) Christoph Sumann	(Slovakia) Ivan Batory	(Russia) Andrei Nutrikhin
2001	(Russia) Dmitry Osinkin	(Belarus) Nikolai Semeniako	(Austria) Johannes Eder
Freestyle
2001	(Russia) Sergei Novikov	(Belarus) Nikolai Semeniako	(Austria) Christian Schwarz
Classical
2003	(Russia) Nikolay Pankratov	(Kazakhstan) Andrei Golovko	(Russia) Pavel Troshkin
Freestyle
2005	(Ukraine) Roman Leybyuk	(Kazakhstan) Nikolay Chebotko	(Kazakhstan) Maksim Odnodvortsev
2007	(Belarus) Alexander Lasutkin	(Russia) Alexander Kuznetsov	(Kazakhstan) Sergey Cherepanov
2009	(Russia) Aleksey Chernousov	(Russia) Sergey Turyshev	(Russia) Konstantin Glavatskikh
Classical
2011	(Russia) Vladislav Skobelev	(Japan) Akira Samuel Lenting	(Kazakhstan) Gennady Matviyenko
Freestyle
2013	(Serbia) Milanko Petrović	(Belarus) Michail Semenov	(Russia) Raul Shakirzianov
Classical
2015	(Russia) Andrey Feller	(Russia) Artyom Nikolaev	(Russia) Valery Gontar
2017	(Russia) Valery Gontar	(Russia) Dmitry Rostovtsev	(France) Alexandre Pouye
2019	(Russia) Ivan Yakimushkin	(Russia) Anton Timashov	(Russia) Ivan Kirillov
2023	(Japan) Ryo Hirose	(Norway) Magnus Bøe	(Norway) Andreas Kirkeng
Freestyle
2025	(Norway) Olaf Talmo	(Finland) Nico Bennert	(Bulgaria) Mario Matikanov

==== 12 km/15 km classical ====
Year	Gold	Silver	Bronze
1960	not included in the program		
12 km
1962	(Soviet Union) Igor Voronchikhin	(Soviet Union) German Karpov	(Soviet Union) Ivar Kondrachev
15 km
1964	(Soviet Union) Igor Voronchikhin	(Soviet Union) Valery Tarakanov	(Soviet Union) Nikolay Arzilov
12 km
1966	(Soviet Union) Igor Voronchikhin	(Soviet Union) Dmitry Yarlykov	(Soviet Union) Vladimir Pustogachev
15 km
1968	(Norway) Jon Høiås	(Soviet Union) Evgeny Platunov	(Soviet Union) Anatoly Zakharov
1970	(Soviet Union) Fyodor Simashev	(Soviet Union) Vladimir Dolganov	(East Germany) Gert-Dietmar Klause
1972	(Soviet Union) Fyodor Simashev	(Soviet Union) Ivan Pronin	(Soviet Union) Sergey Savelyev
1975	(Soviet Union) Yury Vakhrushev	(Soviet Union) Valery Isaev	(Soviet Union) Yevgeny Belyayev
1978	(Bulgaria) Ivan Lebanov	(Bulgaria) Khristo Barzanov	(Czechoslovakia) Jiří Beran
1981	(Soviet Union) Alexander Kozel	(Soviet Union) Yuriy Burlakov	(Soviet Union) Mikhail Devyatyarov
1983	(Soviet Union) Mikhail Devyatyarov	(Bulgaria) Ivan Lebanov	(United States) Todd Boonstra
1985	(Soviet Union) Vladimir Nikitin	(Italy) Silvano Barco	(Soviet Union) Aleksey Prokurorov
1987	(Soviet Union) Vladimir Nikitin	(Soviet Union) Nikolai Gerasimov	(Soviet Union) Dmitry Solovyov
1989	(Czechoslovakia) Martin Jandushek	(Czechoslovakia) Peter Lisichan	(Soviet Union) Taufik Hamitov
1991	(Japan) Hirofumi Watanabe	(Soviet Union) Igor Obuhov	(Soviet Union) Taufik Hamitov
1993	(Russia) Alexandr Zaikov	(Japan) Jiro Oshima	(Finland) Pekka Tadani Launonen
1995	(Belarus) Alexei Tregoubov	(Italy) Francesco Semenzato	(Japan) Daichi Azegami
1997	(Slovakia) Ivan Batory	(Belarus) Sergei Dolidovich	(Russia) Alexander Kravchenko
1999-2025	not included in the program		

==== 20km Mass Start ====
Year	Gold	Silver	Bronze
1960-2023	not included in the program		
2025	(Finland) Markus Kasanen	(Japan) Daito Yamazaki	(Finland) Nico Bennert

==== Mass start 30 km ====
Year	Gold	Silver	Bronze
1960-1970	not included in the program		
Classical
1972	(Soviet Union) Fyodor Simachov	(Soviet Union) Alexander Yemelin	(Switzerland) Ulrich Wenger
1975	(Soviet Union) Valery Isaev	(Soviet Union) Yury Vakhrushev	(Soviet Union) Nikolai Gorshkov
1978	(Soviet Union) Alexander Zavyalov	(Soviet Union) A. Sokolov	(Soviet Union) A. Chourikov
1981	(Bulgaria) Ivan Lebanov	(Soviet Union) Alexander Kozel	(Soviet Union) Alexander Kutukin
1983	(Soviet Union) Mikhail Devyatyarov	(Soviet Union) Vladimir Mazalov	(Bulgaria) Ivan Lebanov
1985	(Soviet Union) Vladimir Nikitin	(Soviet Union) Aleksey Prokurorov	(Italy) Silvano Barco
1987	(Soviet Union) Vladimir Nikitin	(Soviet Union) Dmitry Solovyov	(Soviet Union) Nikolai Gerasimov
1989	(Czechoslovakia) Peter Lisichan	(Czechoslovakia) Martin Jandushek	(Czechoslovakia) Alesh Vanek
1991	(Japan) Kazutoshi Nagahama	(Japan) Hirofumi Watanabe	(Soviet Union) Igor Obuhov
Freestyle
1991	(Soviet Union) Viktor Kamotsky	(Japan) Hiroyuki Imai	(Soviet Union) Sergey Bikov
1993	(Japan) Kazutoshi Nagahama	(Italy) Francesco Semenzato	(Poland) Andrzej Piotrowski
1995	(Japan) Masaaki Kozu	(Poland) Krzysztof Wańczyk	(Ukraine) Mykola Popovych
1997	(Slovakia) Ivan Batory	(China) Qu Donghai	(Ukraine) Mykola Popovych
1999	(Belarus) Sergei Dolidovich	(Russia) Vitaly Raznitsin	(Slovakia) Michal Jurco
Freestyle
2001	(Russia) Sergei Novikov	(Finland) Olli Ohtonen	(Russia) Dmitry Osinkin
2003	(Russia) Ivan Alypov	(Japan) Takeshi Mizobuchi	(Italy) Loris Frasnelli
Classical
2005	(Italy) Luca Orlandi	(Russia) Vladimir Tokarev	(Switzerland) Andrea Florinett
Freestyle
2007	(Russia) Maxim Vylegzhanin	(Belarus) Alexander Lasutkin	(Russia) Nikolay Khokhryakov
Classical
2009	(Russia) Artem Zhmurko	(Czech Republic) Peter Novak	(Russia) Ilya Mashkov
Freestyle
2011	(Russia) Vladislav Skobelev	(Russia) Ilshat Nigmatullin	(Russia) Andrey Kalsin
Classical
2013	(Russia) Vladislav Skobelev	(Russia) Ermil Vokuev	(Russia) Andrey Feller
Freestyle
2015	(Russia) Andrey Larkov	(Russia) Raul Shakirzianov	(Russia) Artem Nikolaev
Classical
2017	(Russia) Dmitry Rostovtsev	(Russia) Valery Gontar	(Kazakhstan) Sergey Malyshev
Freestyle
2023	(United States) John Hagenbuch	(Norway) Magnus Bøe	(Italy) Luca Compagnoni

==== Combined/double pursuit/skiathlon ====
Year	Gold	Silver	Bronze
1960-1970	not included in the program		
15 km combined
1972	(Finland) T. Bachman	(Soviet Union) Vladimir Rusinov	(Czechoslovakia) Ladislav Rygl
1975-1991	not included in the program		
1993	(Italy) Francesco Semenzato	(Russia) Alexandr Zaikov	(Japan) Jiro Oshima
1995-1997	not included in the program		
15 km pursuit
1999	(Austria) Christoph Sumann	(Slovakia) Ivan Batory	(Belarus) Sergei Dolidovich
2001-2005	not included in the program		
2007	(Belarus) Alexander Lasutkin	(Russia) Alexander Kuznetsov	(Russia) Maxim Vylegzhanin
2009	(Russia) Sergey Turyshev	(Russia) Egor Sorin	(Russia) Ilya Mashkov
2011	(Russia) Vladislav Skobelev	(Russia) Ilshat Nigmatullin	(Kazakhstan) Aleksandr Osipov
15 km skiathlon
2013	(Russia) Raul Shakirzianov	(Kazakhstan) Mark Starostin	(Russia) Pavel Siulatov
2015	not included in the program		
10 km pursuit
2017	(Russia) Dmitry Rostovtsev	(Russia) Valery Gontar	(Armenia) Sergey Mikayelyan
2019	(Russia) Ivan Yakimushkin	(Russia) Anton Timashov	(Russia) Ivan Kirillov
2023	(Japan) Ryo Hirose	(Norway) Andreas Kirkeng	(United States) John Hagenbuch

==== Relay ====
Year	Gold	Silver	Bronze
1960	Soviet Union	Czechoslovakia	Poland
1962	not included in the program		
1964	Soviet Union	Czechoslovakia	Poland
1966	Soviet Union	Japan	Czechoslovakia
1968	Soviet Union	Japan	Finland
1970	Soviet Union	East Germany	Japan
1972	Soviet Union	Japan	United States
1975	Soviet Union	Czechoslovakia	Poland
1978	Soviet Union	Czechoslovakia	Bulgaria
1981	Soviet Union	Japan	Finland
1983	Soviet Union	Bulgaria	Finland
1985	Soviet Union	Italy	Canada
1987	Soviet Union	Czechoslovakia	(Socialist Federal Republic of Yugoslavia) Yugoslavia
1989	Soviet Union	Czechoslovakia	Austria
1991	Japan	Germany	Switzerland
1993	Russia	Japan	Austria
1995	Russia	Poland	Ukraine
1997	Slovakia	Belarus	Ukraine
1999	Slovakia	Belarus	Russia
2001	Russia	Ukraine	Poland
2003	Russia	Czech Republic	Kazakhstan
2005	Kazakhstan	Russia	Ukraine
2007	Kazakhstan	France	Russia
2009	Russia	Japan	Czech Republic
2011	France	Russia	Kazakhstan
2013	Kazakhstan	Russia	Finland
2015	Russia	Kazakhstan	Czech Republic
2017	Russia	Kazakhstan	Czech Republic
2019	Russia	Kazakhstan	Finland
2023	France	Norway	Japan
2025	Japan	Switzerland	Finland

== Para Cross-Country Skiing ==
=== Men's 10km ===
Year	Gold	Silver	Bronze
1960-2023	not included in the program		
2025-Standing	(Germany) Marco Meier	(Kazakhstan) Denis Zinov	(Armenia) Garik Melkonyan
2025-Visually Impared	(Finland) Inkki Inola	(Germany) Lennart Volkert	(Kazakhstan) Roman Kurbanov

=== Men's Individual sprint ===
Year	Gold	Silver	Bronze
1960-2023	not included in the program		
2025-Standing	(Germany) Marco Meier	(Kazakhstan) Denis Zinov	(Canada) Charles Lecours
2025-Visually Impared	(Finland) Inkki Inola	(Germany) Lennart Volkert	(Kazakhstan) Roman Kurbanov

=== Women ===
==== Individual sprint ====
Year	Gold	Silver	Bronze
1960-2001	not included in the program		
Freestyle
2003	(Finland) Kirsi Peraelae	(Finland) Riikka Sarasoja	(Italy) Christina Kelder
2005	(Slovenia) Vesna Fabjan	(Finland) Marianne Hannonen	(Kazakhstan) Elena Kolomina
2007	(Poland) Justyna Kowalczyk	(Kazakhstan) Elena Kolomina	(Estonia) Kaili Sirge
2009	(Russia) Natalya Ilyina	(Switzerland) Bettina Gruber	(Ukraine) Marina Kmalets
2011	(Slovakia) Alena Prochazkova	(Czech Republic) Eva Nývltová	(Russia) Alina Kashina
Classical
2013	(Russia) Oxana Usatova	(Russia) Olga Tsareva	(Russia) Olga Repnitsyna
Freestyle
2015	(Kazakhstan) Anastassiya Slonova	(Poland) Ewelina Marcisz	(Russia) Svetlana Nikolaeva
Classical
2017	(Russia) Maria Davydenkova	(Russia) Lilia Vasileva	(Kazakhstan) Anna Stoyan
Freestyle
2019	(Czech Republic) Petra Hynčicová	(Russia) Hristina Matsokina	(Russia) Polina Nekrasova
2023	(Estonia) Mariel Merlii Pulles	(Finland) Tiia Olkkonen	(Germany) Anna-Maria Dietze
2025	(Poland) Izabela Marcisz	(Estonia) Kaidy Kaasiku	(Finland) Ani Lindroos

==== 5 km ====
Year	Gold	Silver	Bronze
1960-1962	not included in the program		
Classical
1964	(Soviet Union) Nina Demina	(Bulgaria) Krastana Stoeva	(Poland) Weronika Budna
1966-1970	not included in the program		
1972	(Soviet Union) L. Makhacheva	(Soviet Union) Olga Rokko	(Soviet Union) Nina Selunina
1975	(Czechoslovakia) Blanka Paulů	(Soviet Union) Nuranya Latfulina	(Soviet Union) Lyubov Korobova
1978	(Czechoslovakia) Blanka Paulů	(Czechoslovakia) Dagmar Paleckova	(Soviet Union) Z. Shaykhlislamova
1981	(Soviet Union) Lyubov Zabolotskaya	(Czechoslovakia) Květa Jeriová	(Czechoslovakia) Blanka Paulů
1983	(Soviet Union) Lyubov Zabolotskaya	(Soviet Union) Lilia Vasilchenko	(Soviet Union) Faina Smirnova
1985	(Soviet Union) Natalja Furletova	(Italy) Guidina Dal Sasso	(Soviet Union) Julia Stepanova
1987	(Soviet Union) Tamara Tikhonova	(Soviet Union) Lyubov Egorova	(Czechoslovakia) Anna Janouskova
1989	(East Germany) Ina Kuemmel	(Soviet Union) Elena Kachirskaia	(Soviet Union) Elena Sedletskaia
1991-1997	not included in the program		
1999	(Ukraine) Valentina Shevchenko	(Slovakia) Jaroslava Bukvajova	(Russia) Marina Lajskaia
2001	(Russia) Olga Moskalenko	(Finland) Mari Rauhala	(Italy) Cristina Kelder
Freestyle
2001	(Russia) Olga Moskalenko	(Russia) Vera Zjatikova	(Italy) Antonella Confortola
Classical
2003	(Kazakhstan) Svetlana Malahova-Shishkina	(Kazakhstan) Oxana Yatskaya	(Finland) Riikka Sarasoja
Freestyle
2005	(Kazakhstan) Svetlana Malahova-Shishkina	(Poland) Justyna Kowalczyk	(Russia) Anna Slepova
2007	(Poland) Justyna Kowalczyk	(Slovakia) Alena Prochazkova	(Belarus) Irina Nafranovich
2009	(Russia) Valentina Novikova	(Russia) Yulia Tchekaleva	(Russia) Anna Slepova
Classical
2011	(Russia) Alia Iksanova	(Ukraine) Kateryna Grygorenko	(Italy) Virginia De Martin Topranin
Freestyle
2013	(Ukraine) Kateryna Grygorenko (Norway) Astrid Øyre Slind	N/A	(Ukraine) Maryna Antsybor
Classical
2015	(Russia) Oxana Usatova	(Kazakhstan) Anastassiya Slonova	(Russia) Lilia Vasilieva
2017	(Russia) Lilia Vasilieva	(Russia) Anna Nechaevskaya	(Kazakhstan) Anna Shevchenko
2019	(Russia) Alisa Zhambalova	(Russia) Ekaterina Smirnova	(Russia) Yana Kirpichenko
2023	(Finland) Hilla Niemelä	(Estonia) Mariel Merlii Pulles	(Italy) Maria Eugenia Boccardi

==== 8 km/10 km classical ====
Year	Gold	Silver	Bronze
1960-1964	not included in the program		
8 km
1966	(Bulgaria) Krastana Stoeva	(Poland) Weronika Budna	(Soviet Union) Olga Alimova
10 km
1968	(Soviet Union) Yanna Yelistratova	(Soviet Union) Lyubov Menchikova	(Soviet Union) Lidiya Doronina
1970	(Soviet Union) Yanna Yelistratova	(Soviet Union) Alevtina Oljunina	(East Germany) Karin Scheidel
1972	(Soviet Union) L. Makhacheva	(Soviet Union) Nina Selyunina	(Poland) Zofia Majerczyk
1975	(Czechoslovakia) Blanka Paulů	(Soviet Union) Natalya Kruglikova	(Soviet Union) Nuranya Latfulina
1978	(Soviet Union) Z. Shaykhlislamova	(Soviet Union) M. Arziaeva	(Czechoslovakia) Z. Janovska
1981	(Czechoslovakia) Květa Jeriová	(Czechoslovakia) Blanka Paulů	(Soviet Union) Lyubov Zabolotskaya
1983	(Soviet Union) Lyubov Zabolotskaya	(Soviet Union) Lilia Vasilchenko	(Soviet Union) Faina Smirnova
1985	(Soviet Union) Natalja Furletova	(Italy) Guidina Dal Sasso	(Soviet Union) Julia Stepanova
1987	(Czechoslovakia) Alzbeta Havrancikova	(Czechoslovakia) Anna Janouskova	(Soviet Union) Lyubov Egorova
1989	(Soviet Union) Elena Sedletskaia	(Soviet Union) Natalia Chernyh	(Soviet Union) Svetlana Kamotskaia
1991	(Japan) Miwa Oto	(Soviet Union) Elena Kashirskaja	(Soviet Union) Vera Federova
1993	(Slovakia) Lubomira Balazova	(Japan) Sumiko Yokoyama	(Russia) Evgenia Kiseleva
1995	(Russia) Olga Kosnatcheva	(Russia) Tatiana Podmazo	(Ukraine) Anna Slipenko
1997	(Japan) Tomomi Otaka	(Russia) Natalia Massalkina	(Russia) Ioulia Lementchouk
1999-2025	not included in the program		

==== 10 km Freestyle ====
Year	Gold	Silver	Bronze
1960-2023	not included in the program		
2025	(Poland) Isabela Marcisz	(Italy) Maria Eugenia Boccardi	(Switzerland) Carla Nina Wohler

==== Mass start 15 km ====
Year	Gold	Silver	Bronze
1960-1989	not included in the program		
Freestyle
1991	(Japan) Miwa Oto	(Soviet Union) Vera Federova	(Soviet Union) Irina Taranenko
1993	(Japan) Naomi Hoshikawa	(Austria) Maria Elisabet Theurl	(Russia) Evgenia Kiseleva
1995	(Russia) Olga Kosnatcheva	(Russia) Ioulia Lementchouk	(Russia) Natalia Sokolova
1997	(Russia) Ioulia Lementchouk	(Russia) Natalia Massalkina	(Russia) Olga Kosnatcheva
1999	(Ukraine) Valentina Shevchenko	(Russia) Elena Bouruchina	(Russia) Marina Lajskaia
2001	not included in the program		
2003	(Ukraine) Valentina Shevchenko	(Russia) Veronika Timofeeva	(Russia) Evgenia Starovoyitova
Classical
2005	(Poland) Justyna Kowalczyk	(Russia) Anna Slepova	(China) Honqxue Li
Freestyle
2007	(Russia) Olga Mikhailova	(Ukraine) Vita Jakimchuk	(Belarus) Olga Vasiljonok
Classical
2009	(Russia) Marina Chernousova	(Russia) Yulia Ivanova	(Russia) Yulia Tchekaleva
Freestyle
2011	(Slovakia) Alena Prochazkova	(Russia) Alia Iksanova	(Ukraine) Kateryna Grygorenko
Classical
2013	(Russia) Oxana Usatova	(Norway) Marte Monrad-Hansen	(Norway) Astrid Øyre Slind
Freestyle
2015	(Kazakhstan) Anastassiya Slonova	(Russia) Svetlana Nikolaeva	(Poland) Ewelina Marcisz
Classical
2017	(Russia) Lilla Vasileva	(Russia) Anna Nechaevskaya	(Kazakhstan) Anna Shevchenko
Freestyle
2019	(Russia) Alisa Zhambalova	(Russia) Ekaterina Smirnova	(Russia) Yana Kirpichenko
2023	(Estonia) Mariel Merlii Pulles	(United States) Kendall Kramer	(Kazakhstan) Xeniya Shalygina

==== 20km Mass Start ====
Year	Gold	Silver	Bronze
1960-2023	not included in the program		
2025	(Estonia) Keidy Kaasiku	(Estonia) Kaidy Kaasiku	(Poland) Izabela Marcisz

==== Combined/double pursuit/skiathlon ====
Year	Gold	Silver	Bronze
1960-1989	not included in the program		
10 km combined
1991	(Japan) Miwa Oto	(Soviet Union) Irina Taranenko	(Italy) Elena Desseri
1993	(Slovakia) Lubomira Balazova	(Japan) Sumiko Yokoyama	(Russia) Evgenia Kiseleva
1995-1997	not included in the program		
10 km pursuit
1999	(Ukraine) Valentina Shevchenko	(Russia) Marina Lajskaia	(Slovakia) Jaroslava Bukvajova
2001-2005	not included in the program		
2007	(Poland) Justyna Kowalczyk	(Slovakia) Alena Prochazkova	(Belarus) Olga Vasiljonok
2009	(Russia) Valentina Novikova	(Russia) Marina Chernousova	(Russia) Yulia Tchekaleva
2011	(Slovakia) Alena Prochazkova	(Russia) Alia Iksanova	(Ukraine) Kateryna Grygorenko
10 km skiathlon
2013	(Kazakhstan) Tatyana Ossipova	(Ukraine) Kateryna Grygorenko	(Finland) Marjaana Pitkänen
2015	not included in the program		
5 km pursuit
2017	(Russia) Anna Nechaevskaya	(Russia) Lilia Vasilieva	(Kazakhstan) Anna Shevchenko
2019	(Russia) Alisa Zhambalova	(Russia) Ekaterina Smirnova	(Russia) Yana Kirpichinko
2023	(Finland) Hilla Niemelä	(Estonia) Mariel Merlii Pulles	(Italy) Maria Eugenia Boccardi

==== Relay ====
Year	Gold	Silver	Bronze
1960	Soviet Union	Czechoslovakia	Poland
1962	not included in the program		
1964	Soviet Union	Bulgaria	Poland
1966	Bulgaria	Soviet Union	Poland
1968	Soviet Union	Poland	Czechoslovakia
1970	East Germany	Soviet Union	Poland
1972	Soviet Union	Poland	United States
1975	Soviet Union	Czechoslovakia	Poland
1978	Czechoslovakia	Soviet Union	Finland
1981	Czechoslovakia	Soviet Union	Finland
1983	Soviet Union	Czechoslovakia	Finland
1985	Czechoslovakia	Poland	Finland
1987	Czechoslovakia	Soviet Union	Poland
1989	Soviet Union	Poland	Sweden
1991	Soviet Union	Japan	Poland
1993	Ukraine	Japan	Russia
1995	Russia	Japan	Ukraine
1997	Russia	Japan	Germany
1999	Russia	Czech Republic	Ukraine
2001	Russia	Italy	Finland
2003	Italy	Finland	Kazakhstan
2005	Kazakhstan	Russia	China
2007	Belarus	Russia	Poland
2009	Russia	Ukraine	France
2011	Russia	Ukraine	France
2013	Ukraine	Sweden	Kazakhstan
2015	Russia	Kazakhstan	France
2017	Russia	Kazakhstan	France
2019	Russia	Japan	Italy
2023	Finland	Norway	Kazakhstan
2025	Finland	Japan	France

=== Mixed ===
==== Team sprint ====
Year	Gold	Silver	Bronze
1960-2009	not included in the program		
2011	Slovakia	France	Ukraine
2013	Russia	Sweden	Russia
2015	Russia	Russia	Czech Republic
2017	Kazakhstan	Russia	France
2019	Russia	Russia	Finland
2023	Japan	United States	Norway
2025	Germany	France	Poland

== Para Cross-country skiing ==
=== Women's 10 km Free ===
Year	Gold	Silver	Bronze
1960-2023	not included in the program		
2025-Visually Impaired	(Germany) Leonie Maria Walter	(Germany) Johanna Reckentenwald	(Poland) Aneta Kobrýn

=== Women's Sprint ===
Year	Gold	Silver	Bronze
1960-2023	not included in the program		
2025-Visually Impaired	(Germany) Leonie Maria Walter	(Germany) Johanna Reckentenwald	(Poland) Aneta Kobrýn

== Medal table ==
Last updated after the 2025 Winter World University Games

Rank	Nation	Gold	Silver	Bronze	Total
1	Russia (RUS)	67	53	48	168
2	Soviet Union (URS)	50	36	33	119
3	Japan (JPN)	14	21	5	40
4	Kazakhstan (KAZ)	14	14	19	47
5	Czechoslovakia (TCH)	11	15	9	35
6	Finland (FIN)	10	8	17	35
7	Slovakia (SVK)	10	5	2	17
8	Ukraine (UKR)	8	6	13	27
9	Poland (POL)	6	9	19	34
10	Belarus (BLR)	5	7	4	16
11	Germany (GER)	5	5	2	12
12	Bulgaria (BUL)	4	5	3	12
13	Italy (ITA)	3	9	13	25
14	Norway (NOR)	3	6	3	12
15	Estonia (EST)	3	4	1	8
16	France (FRA)	2	4	7	13
17	Austria (AUT)	2	1	4	7
18	East Germany (GDR)	2	1	2	5
19	Czech Republic (CZE)	1	5	4	10
20	Switzerland (SUI)	1	2	4	7
20	United States (USA)	1	2	4	7
22	Slovenia (SLO)	1	1	0	2
23	Serbia (SRB)	1	0	0	1
24	Sweden (SWE)	0	2	1	3
25	China (CHN)	0	1	2	3
26	Spain (ESP)	0	1	0	1
27	Armenia (ARM)	0	0	2	2
27	Canada (CAN)	0	0	2	2
29	Yugoslavia (YUG)	0	0	1	1
Totals (29 entries)		224	223	224	671
