= Katri Lylynperä =

Finnish cross-country skier

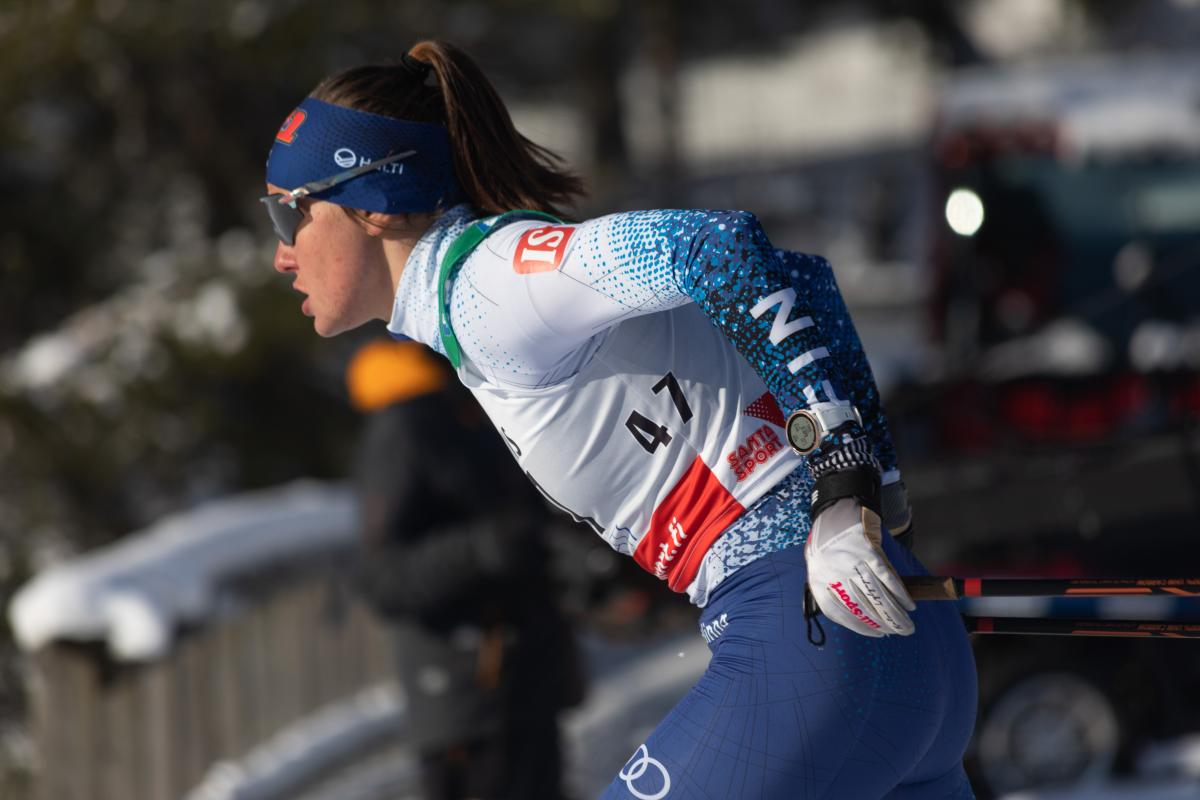

Personal information
- Nationality: Finland
- Born: 3 January 1994 (age 32) Vammala, Finland

Sport
- Sport: Skiing
- Club: Vuokatti Ski Team Kainuu

World Cup career
- Seasons: 11 – (2013–present)
- Indiv. starts: 71
- Indiv. podiums: 0
- Team starts: 8
- Team podiums: 0
- Overall titles: 0 – (43rd in 2022)
- Discipline titles: 0
Medal record
Women's cross-country skiing
Representing Finland
Winter Universiade
| Bronze medal – third place | 2019 Krasnoyarsk | Team sprint |
- Updated on 27 March 2023

Katri Lylynperä (born 3 January 1994) is a Finnish cross-country skier.

== Career ==
She finished 51st in her World Cup debut on 9 March 2013 in Lahti, Finland on the Freestyle Sprint. Her best individual finish during the World Cup is 21st place on 28 November 2015 in Ruka, Finland in the individual sprint.

== Cross-country skiing results ==
All results are sourced from the International Ski Federation (FIS).

=== Olympic Games ===
| Year | Age | 10 km individual | 15 km skiathlon | 30 km mass start | Sprint | 4 × 5 km relay | Team sprint |
|---|---|---|---|---|---|---|---|
| 2022 | 28 | — | — | — | 23 | — | — |

=== World Championships ===
| Year | Age | 10 km individual | 15 km skiathlon | 30 km mass start | Sprint | 4 × 5 km relay | Team sprint |
|---|---|---|---|---|---|---|---|
| 2017 | 23 | — | — | — | 32 | — | — |
| 2019 | 25 | — | — | — | 45 | — | — |
| 2021 | 27 | — | — | — | 8 | — | — |

=== World Cup ===
==== Season standings ====
| Season | Age | Discipline standings | | | | Ski Tour standings | | | | |
| Season | Age | Overall | Distance | Sprint | U23 | Nordic Opening | Tour de Ski | Ski Tour 2020 | World Cup Final | Ski Tour Canada |
|---|---|---|---|---|---|---|---|---|---|---|
| 2013 | 19 | NC | NC | NC | —N/a | — | — | —N/a | — | —N/a |
| 2014 | 20 | NC | NC | NC | —N/a | 78 | — | —N/a | — | —N/a |
| 2015 | 21 | NC | NC | NC | NC | — | — | —N/a | — | —N/a |
| 2016 | 22 | 88 | NC | 56 | 23 | 48 | — | —N/a | —N/a | — |
| 2017 | 23 | 108 | NC | 79 | 23 | — | — | —N/a | — | —N/a |
| 2018 | 24 | NC | NC | NC | —N/a | 66 | — | —N/a | — | —N/a |
| 2019 | 25 | 89 | NC | 57 | —N/a | DNF | — | —N/a | — | —N/a |
| 2020 | 26 | 56 | 86 | 30 | —N/a | DNF | — | — | —N/a | —N/a |
| 2021 | 27 | 75 | NC | 42 | —N/a | 38 | DNF | —N/a | —N/a | —N/a |
| 2022 | 28 | 43 | 59 | 23 | —N/a | —N/a | — | —N/a | —N/a | —N/a |
| 2023 | 29 | 64 | 56 | 44 | —N/a | —N/a | DNF | —N/a | —N/a | —N/a |
