= Alisa Zhambalova =

Russian cross-country skier (born 1994)

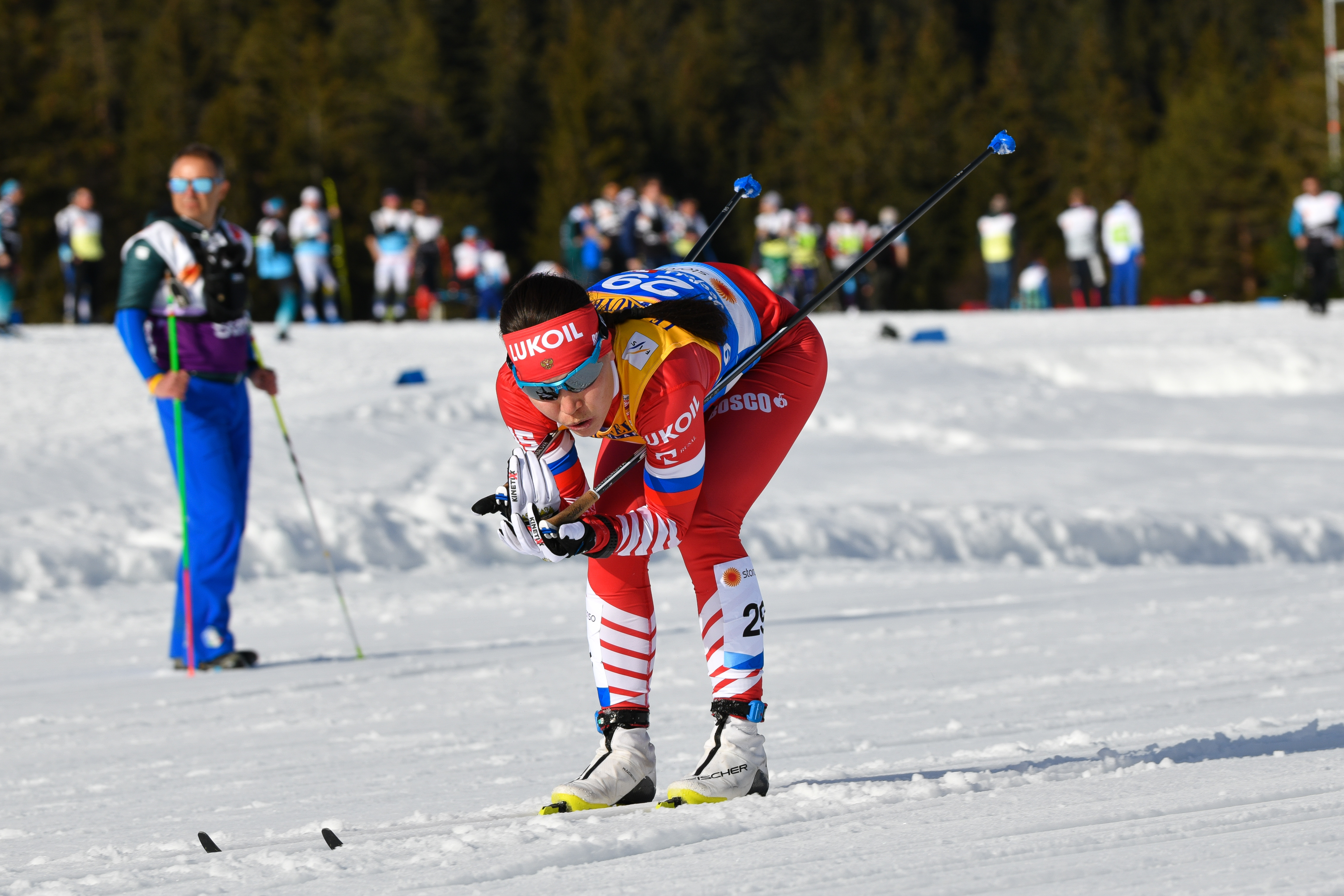

Personal information
- Full name: Alisa Sayanovna Zhambalova
- Nationality: Russia
- Born: 13 September 1994 (age 31) Sagan-Nur, Mukhorshibirsky District, Russia

Sport
- Sport: Skiing

World Cup career
- Seasons: 9 – (2013–2021)
- Indiv. starts: 93
- Indiv. podiums: 0
- Team starts: 4
- Team podiums: 0
- Overall titles: 0 – (22nd in 2021)
- Discipline titles: 0
Medal record
Women's cross-country skiing
Representing Russia
Junior World Championships
Silver medal – second place	2013 Liberec	4 × 3.33 km relay
Silver medal – second place	2014 Val di Fiemme	10 km skiathlon
Silver medal – second place	2014 Val di Fiemme	4 × 3.33 km relay
Bronze medal – third place	2013 Liberec	10 km skiathlon
Winter Universiade
Gold medal – first place	2019 Krasnoyarsk	5 km classical
Gold medal – first place	2019 Krasnoyarsk	5 km freestyle
Gold medal – first place	2019 Krasnoyarsk	15 km freestyle
Gold medal – first place	2019 Krasnoyarsk	3 × 5 km relay
- Updated on 3 November 2021

Alisa Sayanovna Zhambalova (Russian: Алиса Саяновна Жамбалова; born 13 September 1994) is a Russian cross-country skier who competes internationally.

== Early and personal life ==
Zhambalova was born on 13 September 1994 in Sagan-Nur in the Republic of Buryatia, Russia. She represented Russia at the 2012 Winter Youth Olympics in Innsbruck.

== Skiing career ==
Zhambalova made her FIS Cross-Country World Cup debut on 1 February 2013, and competed for Russia at the 2017 FIS Nordic World Ski Championships in Lahti, Finland. She competed at the 2018 Winter Olympics in Pyeongchang, representing OAR. She also competed at the FIS Nordic World Ski Championships 2019.

== Cross-country skiing results ==
All results are sourced from the International Ski Federation (FIS).

=== Olympic Games ===
Year	Age	10 km individual	15 km skiathlon	30 km mass start	Sprint	4 × 5 km relay	Team sprint
2018	23	17	21	15	44	—	—

=== World Championships ===
Year	Age	10 km individual	15 km skiathlon	30 km mass start	Sprint	4 × 5 km relay	Team sprint
2017	22	—	—	23	—	—	—
2019	24	21	—	—	—	—	—
2021	26	—	—	31	—	—	—

=== World Cup ===
==== Season standings ====
Season	Age	Discipline standings				Ski Tour standings				
Season	Age	Overall	Distance	Sprint	U23	Nordic Opening	Tour de Ski	Ski Tour 2020	World Cup Final	Ski Tour Canada
2013	18	NC	—	NC	—N/a	—	—	—N/a	—	—N/a
2014	19	NC	NC	NC	—N/a	—	—	—N/a	—	—N/a
2015	20	NC	NC	NC	NC	64	—	—N/a	—N/a	—N/a
2016	21	90	78	63	24	—	39	—N/a	—N/a	—
2017	22	52	50	36	8	—	30	—N/a	—	—N/a
2018	23	53	40	NC	—N/a	—	20	—N/a	DNF	—N/a
2019	24	63	45	NC	—N/a	—	—	—N/a	—	—N/a
2020	25	35	27	88	—N/a	40	24	22	—N/a	—N/a
2021	26	22	19	74	—N/a	30	12	—N/a	—N/a	—N/a
