= Eva Urevc =

Slovenian cross-country skier (born 1995)

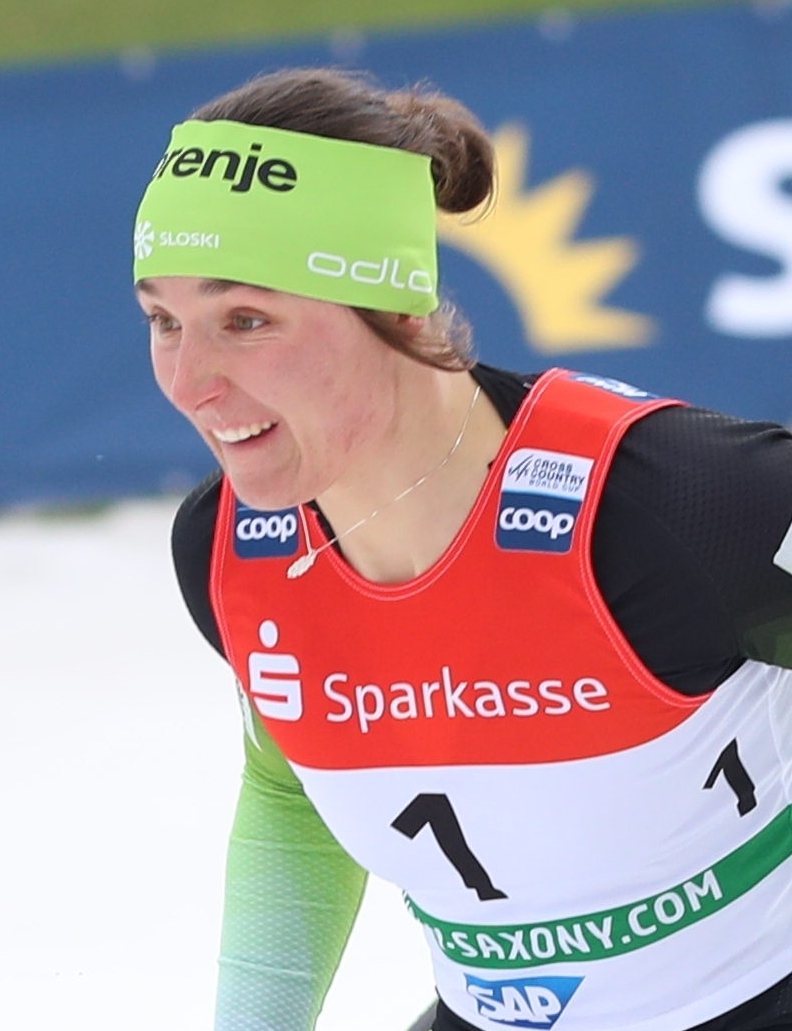
- Urevc in 2019

Personal information
- Nationality: Slovenia
- Born: 2 November 1995 (age 30) Jesenice, Slovenia

Sport
- Sport: Skiing
- Club: ŠD Gorje

World Cup career
- Seasons: 6 – (2017–2019, 2021–present)
- Indiv. starts: 54
- Indiv. podiums: 0
- Indiv. wins: 0
- Team starts: 5
- Team podiums: 3
- Team wins: 1
- Overall titles: 0 – (27th in 2021)
- Discipline titles: 0
Medal record
Women's cross-country skiing
Representing Slovenia
World Championships
Bronze medal – third place	2021 Oberstdorf	Team sprint
- Updated on 27 March 2023

Eva Urevc (born 2 November 1995) is a Slovenian cross-country skier.

She participated at the team sprint event at the FIS Nordic World Ski Championships 2021.

== Cross-country skiing results ==
All results are sourced from the International Ski Federation (FIS).

=== Olympic Games ===
Year	Age	10 km individual	15 km skiathlon	30 km mass start	Sprint	4 × 5 km relay	Team sprint
2022	26	—	—	—	46	—	14

=== World Championships ===
- 1 medal – (1 bronze)

Year	Age	10 km individual	15 km skiathlon	30 km mass start	Sprint	4 × 5 km relay	Team sprint
2019	23	—	—	—	21	9	—
2021	25	—	—	—	28	—	Bronze
2023	27	20	23	—	27	11	8

=== World Cup ===
==== Season standings ====
Season	Age	Discipline standings				Ski Tour standings				
Season	Age	Overall	Distance	Sprint	U23	Nordic Opening	Tour de Ski	Ski Tour 2020	World Cup Final	Ski Tour Canada
2016	20	NC	—	NC	NC	—	—	—N/a	—N/a	—
2017	21	116	—	88	27	—	—	—N/a	—	—N/a
2018	22	NC	NC	NC	NC	78	—	—N/a	—	—N/a
2019	23	52	83	27	—N/a	DNF	DNF	—N/a	42	—N/a
2021	25	27	38	8	—N/a	DNF	DNF	—N/a	—N/a	—N/a
2022	26	41	NC	20	—N/a	—N/a	DNF	—N/a	—N/a	—N/a
2023	27	32	43	29	—N/a	—N/a	12	—N/a	—N/a	—N/a

==== Team podiums ====
- 1 victory – (1 TS)
- 3 podiums – (3 TS)

No.	Season	Date	Location	Race	Level	Place	Teammate
1	2020–21	20 December 2020	Dresden, Germany	12 × 0.65 km Team Sprint F	World Cup	3rd	Lampič
2	2020–21	7 February 2021	Ulricehamn, Sweden	6 × 1.5 km Team Sprint	World Cup	1st	Lampič
3	2021–22	19 December 2021	Dresden, Germany	12 × 0.65 km Team Sprint F	World Cup	3rd	Lampič
