= Valeriya Tyuleneva =

Kazakhstani cross-country skier (born 1997)

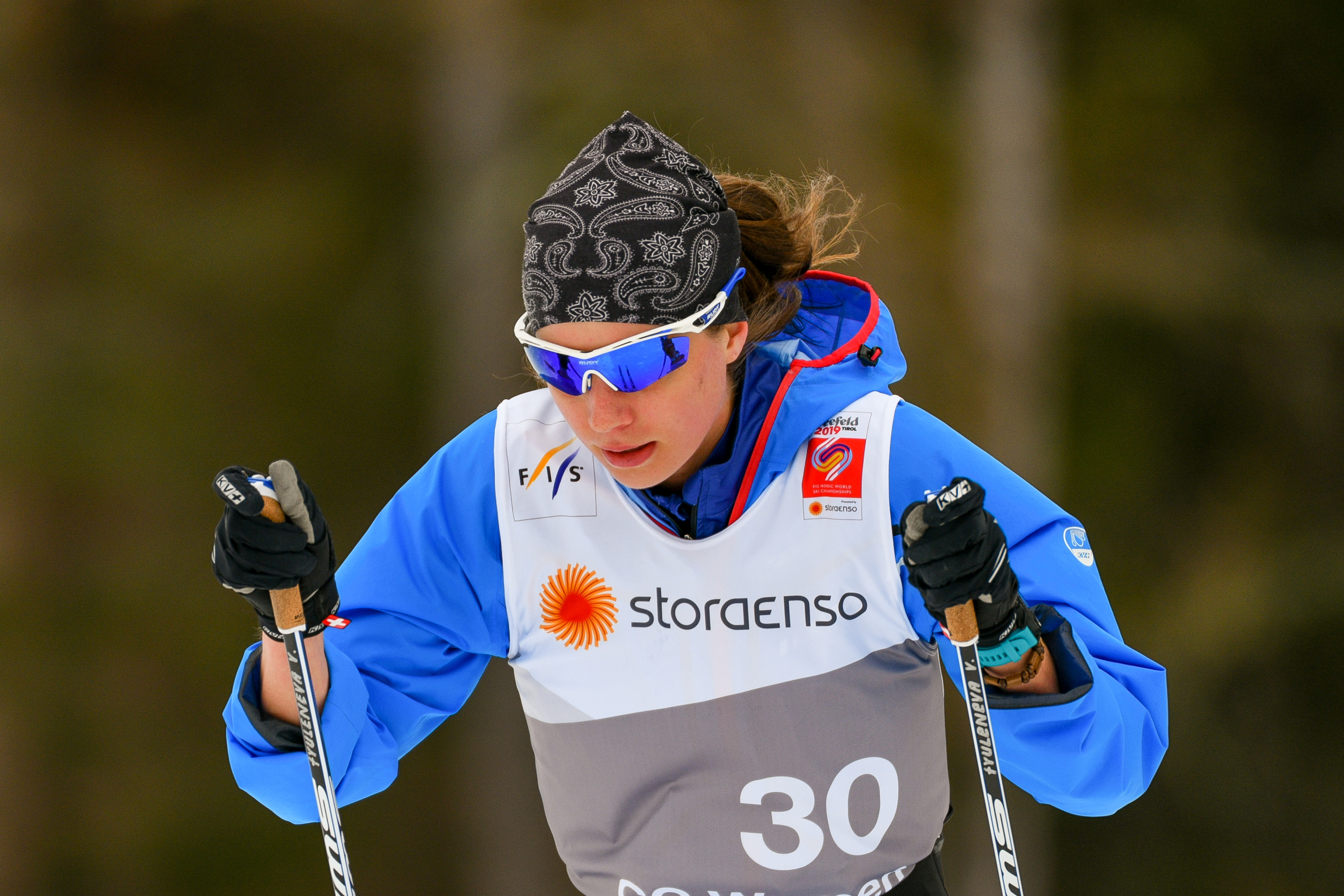
- Tyuleneva in March, 2019

Personal information
- Nationality: Kazakhstan
- Born: 27 September 1997 (age 28) Shchuchinsk, Kazakhstan

Sport
- Sport: Skiing

World Cup career
- Seasons: 4 – (2018–2020, 2022–present)
- Indiv. starts: 25
- Indiv. podiums: 0
- Team starts: 4
- Team podiums: 0
- Overall titles: 0 – (65th in 2020)
- Discipline titles: 0
- Updated on 20 March 2022

Valeriya Yevgenyevna Tyuleneva (Russian: Валерия Евгеньевна Тюленева; born 27 September 1997) is a Kazakhstani cross-country skier who competes internationally.

She competed for Kazakhstan at the FIS Nordic World Ski Championships 2017 in Lahti, Finland.

== Cross-country skiing results ==
All results are sourced from the International Ski Federation (FIS).

=== Olympic Games ===
Year	Age	10 km individual	15 km skiathlon	30 km mass start	Sprint	4 × 5 km relay	Team sprint
2018	20	47	DNF	32	60	—	20
2022	24	59	51	—	—	—	—

=== World Championships ===
Year	Age	10 km individual	15 km skiathlon	30 km mass start	Sprint	4 × 5 km relay	Team sprint
2017	19	62	48	—	—	—	—
2019	21	30	37	23	70	15	—
2021	23	45	33	33	—	11	—

=== World Cup ===
==== Season standings ====
Season	Age	Discipline standings				Ski Tour standings			
Season	Age	Overall	Distance	Sprint	U23	Nordic Opening	Tour de Ski	Ski Tour 2020	World Cup Final
2018	20	NC	NC	—	NC	—	—	—N/a	—
2019	21	107	79	NC	25	47	—	—N/a	—
2020	22	65	51	NC	14	51	30	—	—N/a
2022	24	115	89	—	—N/a	—N/a	—	—N/a	—N/a
