= Cross-country skiing at the 2017 Winter Universiade =

Cross-country skiing at the XXVIII Winter Universiade
- Venue: Alatau Cross-Country Skiing & Biathlon Complex
- Dates: 31 January – 8 February

Cross-country skiing at the 2017 Winter Universiade was held in Alatau Cross-Country Skiing & Biathlon Complex from January 30 to February 8, 2017.

== Men's events ==
Event	Gold		Silver		Bronze	
Sprint classical	(Kazakhstan) Ivan Lyuft	3:53.60	(Russia) Vladimir Frolov	3:54.30	(Russia) Egor Berezin	3:54.57
10 km classical	(Russia) Valeriy Gontar	25:12.0	(Russia) Dmitriy Rostovtsev	25:20.9	(France) Alexandre Pouyé	25:33.8
10 km pursuit freestyle	(Russia) Dmitriy Rostovtsev	26:12.5	(Russia) Valeriy Gontar	26:27.2	(Armenia) Sergey Mikayelyan	27:04.5
30 km classical mass start	(Russia) Dmitriy Rostovtsev	1:19.37.5	(Russia) Valeriy Gontar	1:19.37.8	(Kazakhstan) Sergey Malyshev	1:19.38.0
4 x 7.5 km relay	Russia; Egor Berezin; Valeriy Gontar; Kirill Vichuzhanin; Dmitriy Rostovtsev	1:12:49.3	Kazakhstan; Sergey Malyshev; Vitaliy Pukhkalo; Rinat Mukhin; Olzhas Klimin	1:12:51.1	Czech Republic; Jakub Antoš; Miroslav Rypl; Jakub Pšenička; Jakub Graef	1:14:51.8

== Women's events ==
Event	Gold		Silver		Bronze	
Sprint classical	(Russia) Maria Davydenkova	3:18.95	(Russia) Lilia Vasilieva	3:21.34	(Kazakhstan) Anna Stoyan	3:26.06
5 km classical	(Russia) Lilia Vasilieva	14:08.6	(Russia) Anna Nechaevskaya	14:21.9	(Kazakhstan) Anna Shevchenko	14:23.8
5 km pursuit freestyle	(Russia) Anna Nechaevskaya	13:29.7	(Russia) Lilia Vasilieva	13:47.8	(Kazakhstan) Anna Shevchenko	13:51.0
15 km classical mass start	(Russia) Lilia Vasilieva	44:09.7	(Russia) Anna Nechaevskaya	44:11:7	(Kazakhstan) Anna Shevchenko	44:17:5
3 x 5 km relay	Russia; Lilia Vasilieva; Olga Repnitsyna; Anna Nechaevskaya	42:25.1	Kazakhstan; Anna Shevchenko; Olga Mandrika; Irina Bykova	43:17.2	France; Coralie Bentz; Léa Damiani; Céline Chopard Lallier	44:11.2

== Mixed events ==
Event	Gold		Silver		Bronze	
Team sprint freestyle	Kazakhstan I Anna Shevchenko; Olzhas Klimin	18:23.48	France II; Céline Chopard Lallier; Louis Schwartz	18:28.67	Russia I Maria Davydenkova; Vladimir Frolov	18:29.50
