= Petra Hynčicová =

Czech cross-country skier

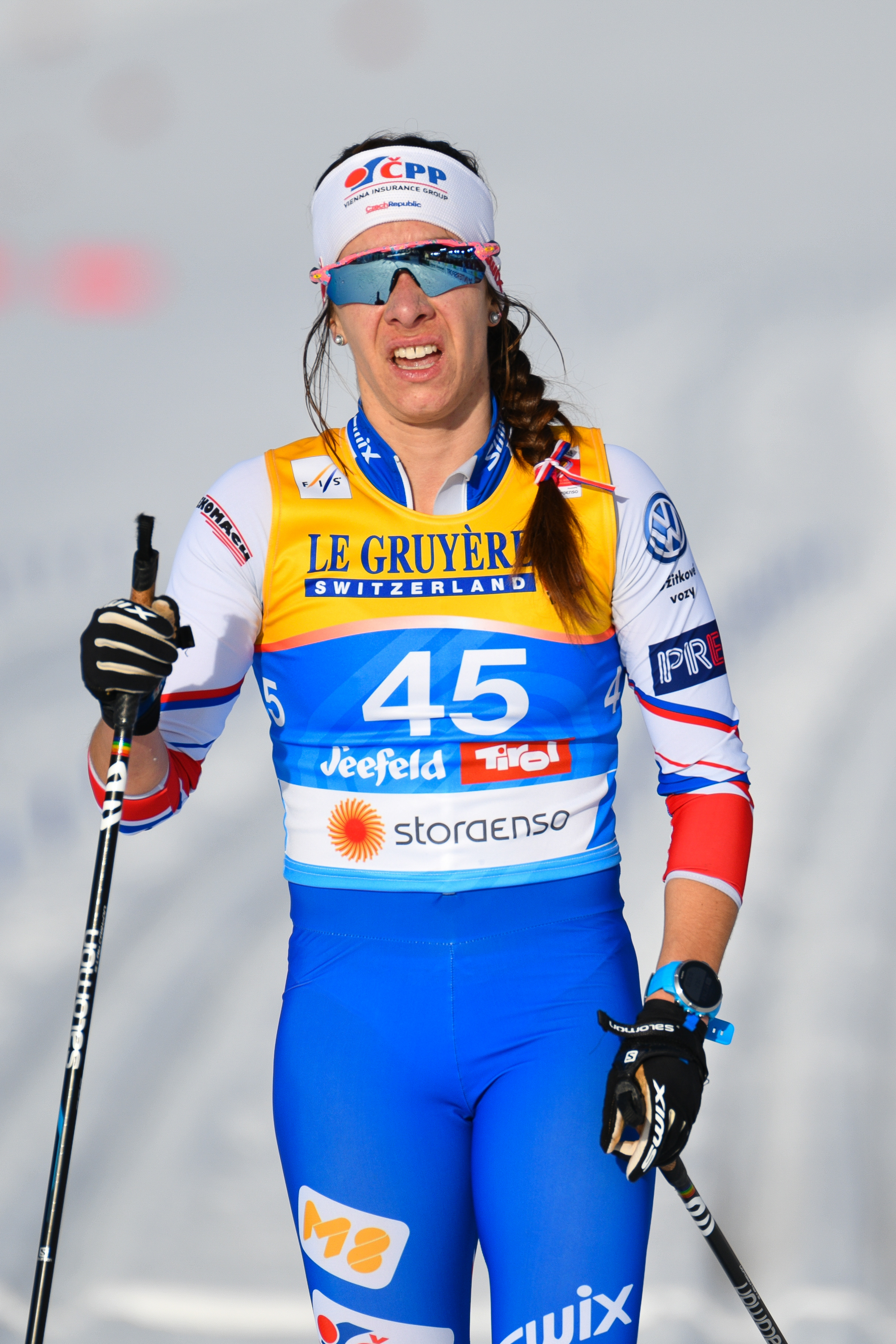
- Petra Hynčicová in 2019

Personal information
- Nationality: Czech Republic
- Born: 1 May 1994 (age 32) Liberec, Czech Republic

Sport
- Sport: Skiing
- Club: Dukla Liberec

World Cup career
- Seasons: 6 – (2014, 2018–2022)
- Indiv. starts: 50
- Indiv. podiums: 0
- Team starts: 9
- Team podiums: 0
- Overall titles: 0 – (72nd in 2021)
- Discipline titles: 0
- Updated on 19 March 2022

Petra Hynčicová (born 1 May 1994) is a Czech cross-country skier.

She competed in the women's 15 kilometre skiathlon at the 2018 Winter Olympics. She competed at the 2022 Winter Olympics, in Women's 10 kilometre classical, Women's 30 kilometre freestyle, Women's 15 kilometre skiathlon, Women's sprint, and Women's 4 × 5 kilometre relay.

== Cross-country skiing results ==
All results are sourced from the International Ski Federation (FIS).

=== Olympic Games ===
Year	Age	10 km individual	15 km skiathlon	30 km mass start	Sprint	4 × 5 km relay	Team sprint
2018	23	60	47	39	45	—	—
2022	27	42	26	41	33	13	15

=== World Championships ===
Year	Age	10 km individual	15 km skiathlon	30 km mass start	Sprint	4 × 5 km relay	Team sprint
2019	24	48	—	—	43	11	13
2021	26	33	—	36	35	8	—

==== Season standings ====
Season	Age	Discipline standings			Ski Tour standings			
Season	Age	Overall	Distance	Sprint	Nordic Opening	Tour de Ski	Ski Tour 2020	World Cup Final
2014	19	NC	NC	NC	—	—	—N/a	—
2018	23	NC	NC	—	—	—	—N/a	—
2019	24	NC	NC	NC	—	—	—N/a	—
2020	25	NC	NC	NC	—	—	—	—N/a
2021	26	72	NC	51	59	40	—N/a	—N/a
2022	27	93	75	67	—N/a	DNF	—N/a	—N/a
