= Marcisz =

Marcisz is a Polish surname. Notable people with the surname include:

- Ewelina Marcisz (born 1991), Polish cross-country skier
- Izabela Marcisz (born 2000), Polish cross-country skier
