= Valiantsina Kaminskaya =

Belarusian cross-country skier (born 1987)

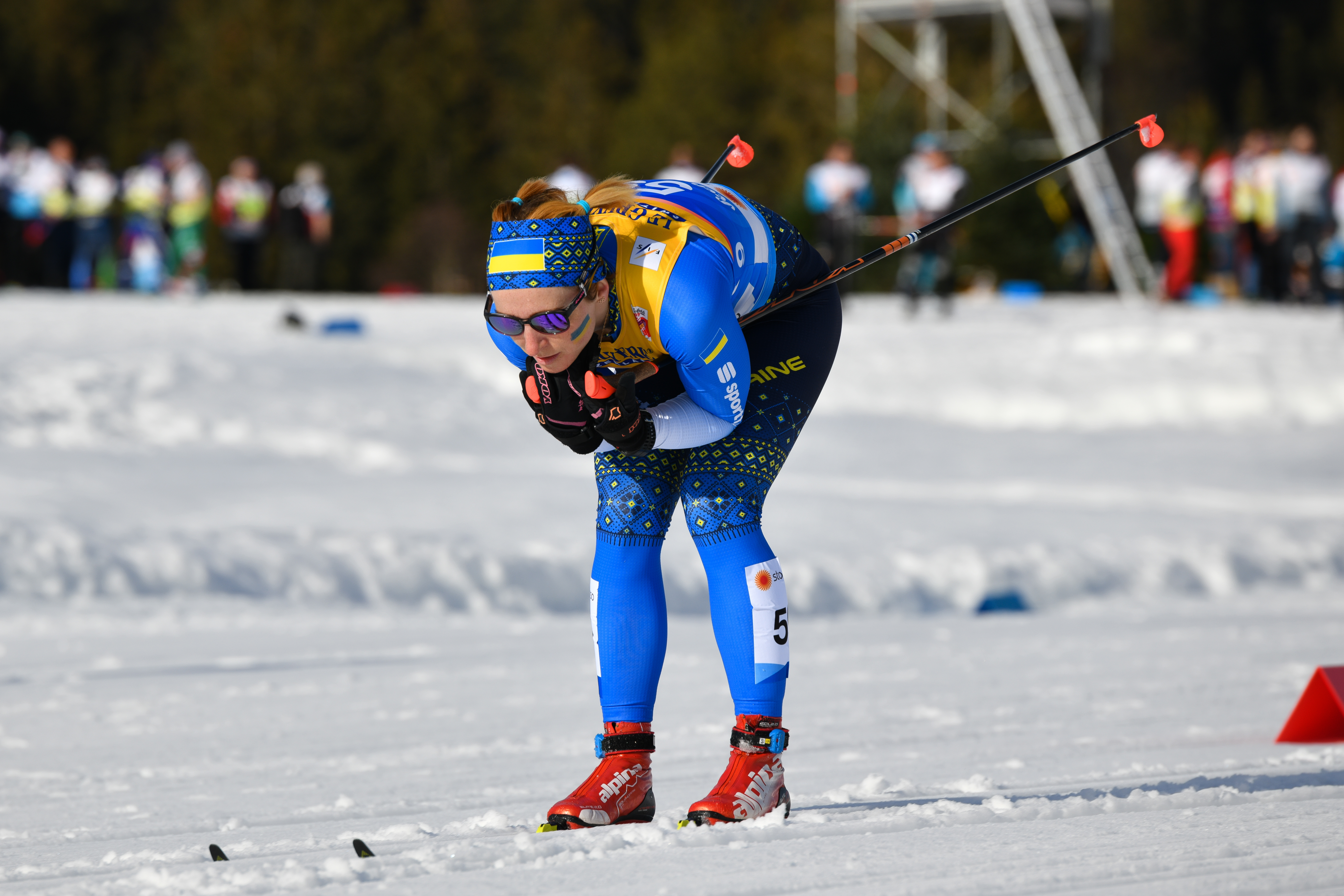

Personal information
- Nationality: Ukraine
- Born: September 5, 1987 (age 39) Mahilyow, Belarusian SSR, Soviet Union

Sport
- Sport: Skiing

World Cup career
- Seasons: 10 – (2012–2016, 2018–2022)
- Indiv. starts: 39
- Indiv. podiums: 0
- Team starts: 4
- Team podiums: 0
- Overall titles: 0 – (112th in 2021)
- Discipline titles: 0
- Updated on January 8, 2023

Valiantsina Valiancinaŭna Kaminskaya, also Valentyna Kaminska, (Belarusian: Валянціна Валянцінаўна Камінская, Ukrainian: Валентина Валентинівна Камінська; born September 5, 1987, in Mahilyow) is a Belarusian (until 2018) and Ukrainian (since June 2018) cross-country skier. She competed at the 2014 Winter Olympics, 2018 Winter Olympics, and 2022 Winter Olympics.

== Biography ==
Kaminskaya started her international career in 2007 when she competed at the Junior World Ski Championships in Tarvisio, finishing 69th in 10 km pursuit and 82nd in 5 km freestyle.

Kaminskaya made her World Cup debut on February 2, 2012, in Moscow, when she finished 38th in sprint. While competing for Belarus, her best World Cup finish was 37th in a freestyle sprint race in Ryabinsk during the 2014–15 season. As of January 2022, this result still remains her best individual World Cup finish.

Kaminskaya competed at the 2014 Winter Olympics for Belarus. She placed 47th in the qualifying round in the sprint, failing to advance to the knockout stages. She competed at the 2018 Winter Olympics where she took part in four events. At those Games, Kaminskaya was the only one in her team born Belarus.

Kaminskaya's transition to the Ukrainian team was announced in June 2018. On November 24, 2018, Kaminskaya debuted for Ukraine at the World Cup stage in Ruka where she was 61st in sprint.

In 2022, Valiantsina Kaminskaya was nominated for her third Winter Games in Beijing as a member of Ukrainian national team. She finished 79th in the 10 km event, 70th in the women's sprint qualification, and was part of the relay team which finished 18th. Kaminskaya failed a doping test and was suspended during the Olympics on February 16.

Kaminskaya participated at three World Championships: in 2013 (for Belarus), 2019, and 2021 (both for Ukraine). Her best personal performance was 42nd in 30 km mass start in 2021. She also took part at the 2009 Winter Universiade, with her best personal result being 24th in sprint.

== Cross-country skiing results ==
All results are sourced from the International Ski Federation (FIS).

=== Olympic Games ===
Year	Age	10 km individual	15 km skiathlon	30 km mass start	Sprint	4 × 5 km relay	Team sprint
2014	26	—	—	—	46	—	—
2018	30	70	—	45	47	14	—
2022	34	79	—	—	70	18	—

=== World Championships ===
Year	Age	10 km individual	15 km skiathlon	30 km mass start	Sprint	4 × 5 km relay	Team sprint
2013	25	—	—	—	45	—	17
2019	31	63	—	—	60	17	17
2021	33	59	46	42	66	13	18

=== World Cup ===
==== Season standings ====
Season	Age	Discipline standings			Ski Tour standings				
Season	Age	Overall	Distance	Sprint	Nordic Opening	Tour de Ski	Ski Tour 2020	World Cup Final	Ski Tour Canada
2012	24	NC	—	NC	—	—	—N/a	—	—N/a
2013	25	NC	—	NC	DNF	—	—N/a	—	—N/a
2014	26	NC	NC	NC	DNF	—	—N/a	—	—N/a
2015	27	NC	—	NC	—	—	—N/a	—N/a	—N/a
2016	28	NC	NC	NC	76	—	—N/a	—N/a	—
2018	30	NC	NC	NC	DNF	—	—N/a	—	—N/a
2019	31	NC	NC	NC	—	—	—N/a	—	—N/a
2020	32	NC	NC	NC	72	—	—	—N/a	—N/a
2021	33	112	82	NC	61	—	—N/a	—N/a	—N/a
2022	34	NC	NC	NC	—N/a	—	—N/a	—N/a	—N/a
