= Yana Kirpichenko =

Russian cross-country skier

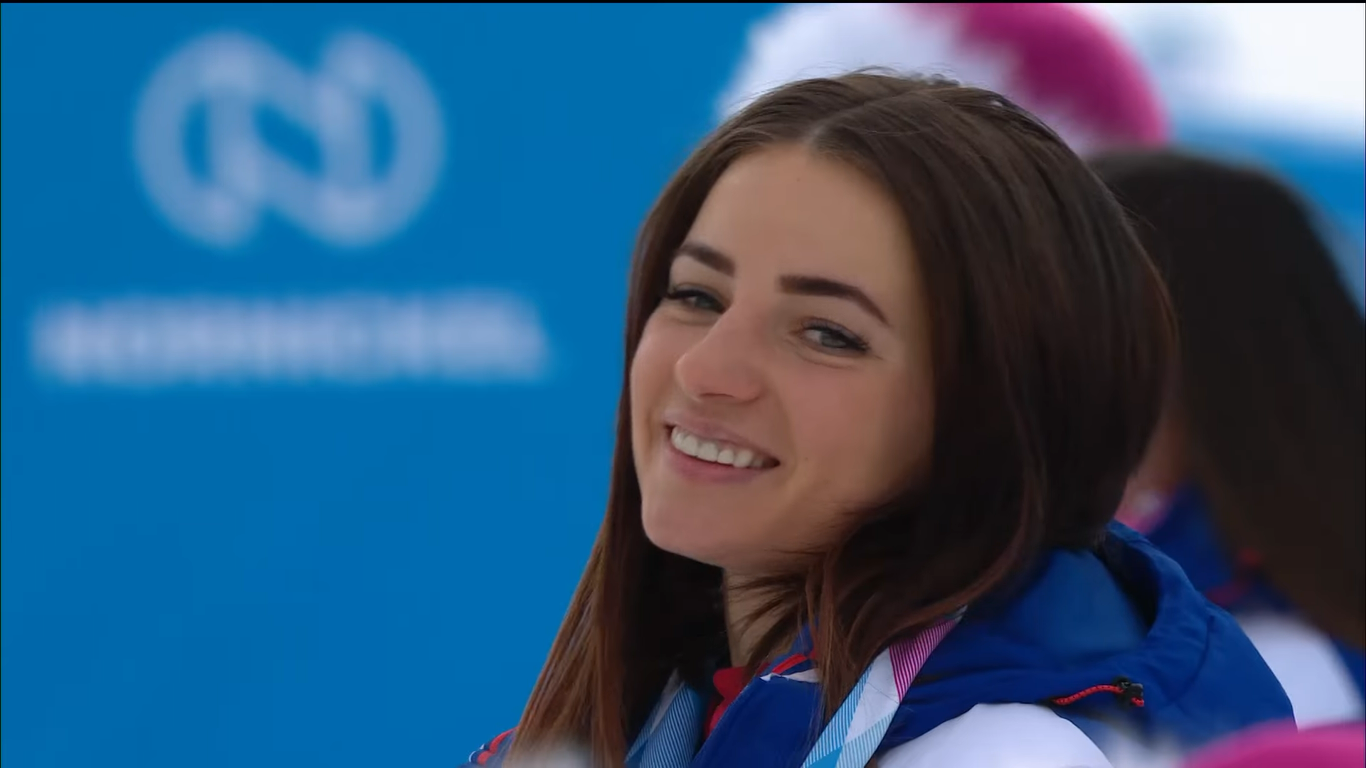

Personal information
- Full name: Yana Vyacheslavovna Kirpichenko
- Nationality: Russia
- Born: 22 January 1996 (age 30) Barnaul, Russia

Sport
- Sport: Skiing

World Cup career
- Seasons: 5 – (2018–2022)
- Indiv. starts: 55
- Indiv. podiums: 0
- Team starts: 5
- Team podiums: 0
- Overall titles: 0 – (21st in 2021)
- Discipline titles: 0
Medal record
Women's cross-country skiing
Representing Russian Ski Federation
World Championships
Silver medal – second place	2021 Oberstdorf	4 × 5 km relay
Representing Russia
U23 World Championships
Gold medal – first place	2018 Goms	10 km classical
Bronze medal – third place	2017 Park City	15 km skiathlon
Bronze medal – third place	2018 Goms	15 km skiathlon
Junior World Championships
Silver medal – second place	2015 Almaty	4 × 3.33 km relay
Bronze medal – third place	2016 Râșnov	4 × 2.5 km relay
Winter Universiade
Gold medal – first place	2019 Krasnoyarsk	3 × 5 km relay
Bronze medal – third place	2019 Krasnoyarsk	5 km classical
Bronze medal – third place	2019 Krasnoyarsk	5 km freestyle
Bronze medal – third place	2019 Krasnoyarsk	15 km freestyle
- Updated on 23 March 2023

Yana Vyacheslavovna Kirpichenko (Russian: Яна Вячеславовна Кирпиченко; born 22 January 1996) is a Russian cross-country skier who competes internationally.

She competed at the FIS Nordic World Ski Championships 2021 in Oberstdorf, where she won a silver medal in the relay with the Russian team, and placed tenth in the skiathlon.

== Cross-country skiing results ==
All results are sourced from the International Ski Federation (FIS).

=== World Championships ===
- 1 medal – (1 silver)

Year	Age	10 km individual	15 km skiathlon	30 km mass start	Sprint	4 × 5 km relay	Team sprint
2021	25	—	10	12	—	Silver	—

=== World Cup ===
==== Season standings ====
Season	Age	Discipline standings				Ski Tour standings			
Season	Age	Overall	Distance	Sprint	U23	Nordic Opening	Tour de Ski	Ski Tour 2020	World Cup Final
2018	22	95	74	NC	16	—	30	—N/a	—
2019	23	NC	NC	NC	NC	DNF	—	—N/a	—
2020	24	44	30	NC	—N/a	33	21	37	—N/a
2021	25	21	16	NC	—N/a	36	13	—N/a	—N/a
2022 (Note: On 1 March 2022, following the 2022 Russian invasion of Ukraine, FIS decided to not allow athletes from Russian and Belarus to take part in FIS competitions, with an immediate effect.)	26	86	53	NC	—N/a	—N/a	DNF	—N/a	—N/a
