= Cross-country skiing at the 2019 Winter Universiade =

Cross-country skiing at the XXIX Winter Universiade
- Dates: 3–12 March 2019

Cross-country skiing at the 2019 Winter Universiade was held at the Raduga Cluster of the Winter Sports Academy in Krasnoyarsk from 3 to 12 March 2019.

== Men's events ==
Event	Gold		Silver		Bronze	
10 km classic	(Russia) Ivan Yakimushkin	26:00.6	(Russia) Anton Timashov	26:16.3	(Russia) Ivan Kirillov	26:18.8
10 km pursuit free	(Russia) Ivan Yakimushkin	23:03.5	(Russia) Anton Timashov	23:15.3	(Russia) Ivan Kirillov	23:15.5
Sprint free	(Russia) Alexander Terentev	2:49.39	(Kazakhstan) Asset Dyussenov	2:49.41	(Russia) Andrey Sobakarev	2:51.46
30 km free mass start	(Japan) Naoto Baba	1:10:20.9	(Russia) Kirill Kilivnyuk	1:10:51.7	(Russia) Ilya Poroshkin	1:10:56.7
4 x 7.5 km relay	Russia; Ivan Kirillov; Anton Timashov; Kirill Kilivnyuk; Ivan Yakimushkin	1:15:22.2	Kazakhstan; Ivan Lyuft; Asset Dyussenov; Nikita Gridin; Olzhas Klimin	1:16:48.8	Finland; Juuso Mäkelä; Joonas Sarkkinen; Waltteri Vinkanharju; Joel Ikonen	1:17:09.1

== Women's events ==
Event	Gold		Silver		Bronze	
5 km classic	(Russia) Alisa Zhambalova	14:48.6	(Russia) Ekaterina Smirnova	14:52.3	(Russia) Yana Kirpichenko	14:52.4
5 km pursuit free	(Russia) Alisa Zhambalova	12:42.9	(Russia) Ekaterina Smirnova	12:43.6	(Russia) Yana Kirpichenko	12:51.9
Sprint free	(Czech Republic) Petra Hynčicová	2:47.34	(Russia) Hristina Matsokina	2:48.14	(Russia) Polina Nekrasova	2:48.54
15 km free mass start	(Russia) Alisa Zhambalova	38:39.8	(Russia) Ekaterina Smirnova	38:39.8	(Russia) Yana Kirpichenko	38:45.4
3 x 5 km relay	Russia; Yana Kirpichenko; Ekaterina Smirnova; Alisa Zhambalova	43:01.3	Japan; Kozue Takizawa; Shiori Yokohama; Miki Kodama	44:33.7	Italy; Martina Bellini; Francesca Franchi; Ilenia Defrancesco	44:56.4

== Mixed event ==
Event	Gold		Silver		Bronze	
Team sprint classic	Russia 1 Alexander Terentev; Hristina Matsokina	22:11.37	Russia 2 Andrey Sobakarev; Polina Nekrasova	22:22.02	Finland 1 Joonas Sarkkinen; Katri Lylynperä	22:29.26

== Medal table ==
* Host nation (Russia)

Rank	Nation	Gold	Silver	Bronze	Total
1	Russia*	9	8	8	25
2	Japan	1	1	0	2
3	Czech Republic	1	0	0	1
4	Kazakhstan	0	2	0	2
5	Finland	0	0	2	2
6	Italy	0	0	1	1
Totals (6 entries)		11	11	11	33
