= Cross-country skiing at the 2007 Winter Universiade =

Cross-country skiing at the 2007 Winter Universiade included ten cross-country skiing events.

== Medal table ==
| Rank | Nation | Gold | Silver | Bronze | Total |
|---|---|---|---|---|---|
| 1 | Belarus (BLR) | 1 | 0 | 1 | 2 |
| 2 | Poland (POL) | 1 | 0 | 0 | 1 |
| 3 | Russia (RUS) | 0 | 1 | 0 | 1 |
| 3 | Slovakia (SVK) | 0 | 1 | 0 | 1 |
| 5 | Kazakhstan (KAZ) | 0 | 0 | 1 | 1 |
| Totals (5 entries) | | 2 | 2 | 2 | 6 |

== Men's events ==
=== 10km Classical Individual ===
| Pos. | Athlete | Time | Behind |
|---|---|---|---|
| 1st place, gold medalist(s) | (Belarus) Alexander Lasutkin | 29:14.9 | 0.0 |
| 2nd place, silver medalist(s) | (Russia) Aleksandr Kuznetsov | 29:31.2 | + 16.3 |
| 3rd place, bronze medalist(s) | (Kazakhstan) Sergey Cherepanov | 29:43.8 | + 28.9 |
| 4. | (Kazakhstan) Andrey Kondroschev | 29:48.8 | + 33.9 |
| 5. | (Kazakhstan) Alexey Poltaranin | 29:54.1 | + 39.2 |
| 6. | (France) Cyril Miranda | 30:08.4 | + 53.5 |
| 7. | (Belarus) Aleksey Ivanov | 30:12.4 | + 57.5 |
| 8. | (Kazakhstan) Andrei Golovko | 30:23.1 | + 1:08.2 |
| 9. | (Poland) Maciej Kreczmer | 30:23.6 | + 1:08.7 |
| 10. | (Russia) Andrej Gelijmanov | 30:30.4 | + 1:15.5 |

== Women's events ==
=== 5km Classical Individual ===
| Pos. | Athlete | Time | Behind |
|---|---|---|---|
| 1st place, gold medalist(s) | (Poland) Justyna Kowalczyk | 14:33.0 | 0.0 |
| 2nd place, silver medalist(s) | (Slovakia) Alena Prochazkova | 15:34.5 | + 1:01.5 |
| 3rd place, bronze medalist(s) | (Belarus) Irina Nafranovich | 15:54.1 | + 1:21.1 |
| 4. | (Belarus) Viktoria Lopatina | 16:02.2 | + 1:29.2 |
| 5. | (Kazakhstan) Elena Kolomina | 16:03.7 | + 1:30.7 |
| 6. | (Belarus) Tatjana Kosorigina | 16:07.0 | + 1:34.0 |
| 7. | (Kazakhstan) Tatjana Roshina | 16:07.6 | + 1:34.6 |
| 8. | (Belarus) Olga Vasiljonok | 16:09.1 | + 1:36.1 |
| 9. | (Ukraine) Maryna Antsybor | 16:13.0 | + 1:40.0 |
| 10. | (Estonia) Kaili Sirge | 16:17.3 | + 1:44.3 |
