= Cross-country skiing at the 2015 Winter Universiade =

Cross-country skiing at the 2015 Winter Universiade was held in Štrbské Pleso from January 25 to February 1, 2015.

== Men's events ==
| Event | Gold | | Silver | | Bronze | |
|---|---|---|---|---|---|---|
| Sprint free | (Russia) Andrey Larkov | 3:22.41 | (Russia) Anton Gafarov | 3:22.59 | (Russia) Raul Shakirzianov | 3:23.64 |
| 10 km classic | (Russia) Andrey Feller | 23:29.2 | (Russia) Artem Nikolaev | 23:30 | (Russia) Valeriy Gontar | 23:39.3 |
| 30 km free mass start | (Russia) Andrey Larkov | 1;16:20.1 | (Russia) Raul Shakirzianov | 1;16:20.7 | (Russia) Artem Nikolaev | 1;16:21.7 |
| 4 x 7.5 km relay | (Russia) Russia; Andrey Feller; Artem Nikolaev; Raul Shakirzianov; Andrey Larkov | 1:22:49 | (Kazakhstan) Kazakhstan; Alexandr Malyshev; Yevgeniy Velichko; Yevgeniy Bondarenko; Mark Starostin | 1:24:42.7 | (Czech Republic) Czech Republic; Jacob Kordač; Adam Fellner; Jakub Gräf; Daniel Maka | 1;25:46 |

== Women's events ==
| Event | Gold | | Silver | | Bronze | |
|---|---|---|---|---|---|---|
| Sprint free | (Kazakhstan) Anastassiya Slonova | 3:22.75 | (Poland) Ewelina Marcisz | 3:22.93 | (Russia) Svetlana Nikolaeva | 3:23.17 |
| 5 km classic | (Russia) Oxana Usatova | 13:09.5 | (Kazakhstan) Anastassiya Slonova | 13:27.6 | (Russia) Lilia Vasilieva | 13:31.4 |
| 15 km free mass start | (Kazakhstan) Anastassiya Slonova | 44:47.1 | (Russia) Svetlana Nikolaeva | 44:55.9 | (Poland) Ewelina Marcisz | 45:02.3 |
| 3 x 5 km relay | (Russia) Russia; Oxana Usatova; Viktoria Karkina; Svetlana Nikolaeva | 47:47.1 | (Kazakhstan) Kazakhstan; Anna Stoyan; Viktoriya Lanchakova; Anastassiya Slonova | 48:30.7 | (France) France; Iris Pessey; Julia Devaux; Marion Buillet | 49:18.2 |

== Mixed events ==
| Event | Gold | | Silver | | Bronze | |
|---|---|---|---|---|---|---|
| Team sprint classic | Russia; Anton Gafarov; Svetlana Nikolaeva | 19:56.98 | Russia; Raul Shakirzianov; Anna Povoliaeva | 20:00.84 | Czech Republic; Jan Šrail; Karolína Grohová | 20:01.76 |

== Medal table ==
| Rank | Nation | Gold | Silver | Bronze | Total |
|---|---|---|---|---|---|
| 1 | Russia | 7 | 5 | 5 | 17 |
| 2 | Kazakhstan | 2 | 3 | 0 | 5 |
| 3 | Poland | 0 | 1 | 1 | 2 |
| 4 | Czech Republic | 0 | 0 | 2 | 2 |
| 5 | France | 0 | 0 | 1 | 1 |
| Totals (5 entries) | | 9 | 9 | 9 | 27 |
