= Anna Shevchenko =

Kazakhstani cross-country skier (born 1993)

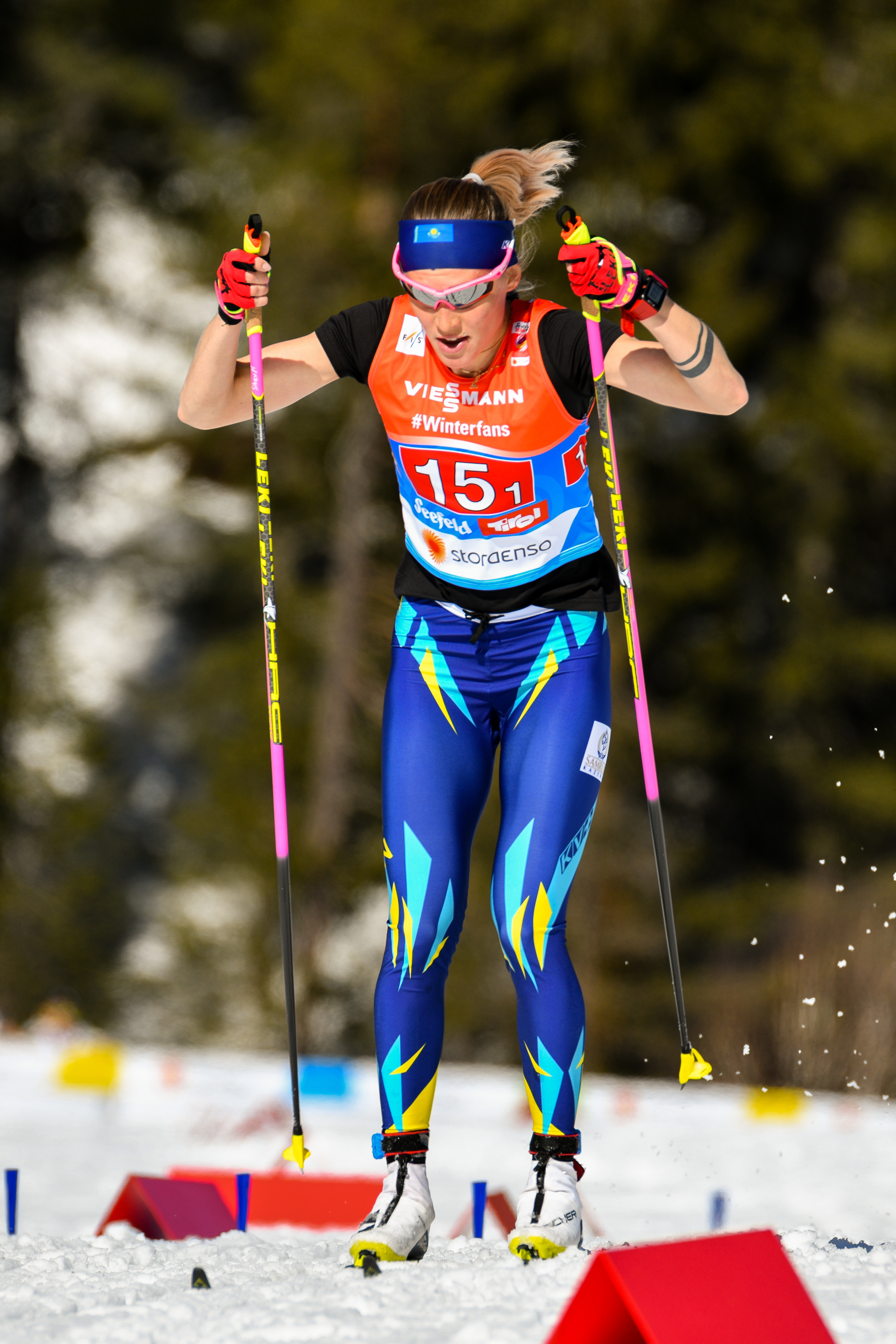
- Shevchenko in February, 2019

Personal information
- Nationality: Kazakhstan
- Born: 4 August 1993 (age 32)

Sport
- Sport: Skiing

World Cup career
- Seasons: 4 – (2017–2020, 2023–present)
- Indiv. starts: 60
- Indiv. podiums: 0
- Team starts: 6
- Team podiums: 0
- Overall titles: 0 – (77th in 2018)
- Discipline titles: 0
- Updated on 7 January 2023

Anna Vitalyevna Shevchenko (Russian: Анна Витальевна Шевченко; born 4 August 1993) is a Kazakhstani cross-country skier who competes internationally.

She competed for Kazakhstan at the FIS Nordic World Ski Championships 2017 in Lahti, Finland.

== Cross-country skiing results ==
All results are sourced from the International Ski Federation (FIS).

=== Olympic Games ===
Year	Age	10 km individual	15 km skiathlon	30 km mass start	Sprint	4 × 5 km relay	Team sprint
2018	24	56	36	31	29	—	20

=== World Championships ===
Year	Age	10 km individual	15 km skiathlon	30 km mass start	Sprint	4 × 5 km relay	Team sprint
2013	19	—	59	36	65	15	—
2015	21	—	46	43	46	—	—
2017	23	—	23	—	43	12	14
2019	25	38	41	33	62	15	—
2021	27	36	—	30	52	—	17

=== World Cup ===
==== Season standings ====
Season	Age	Discipline standings			Ski Tour standings			
Season	Age	Overall	Distance	Sprint	Nordic Opening	Tour de Ski	Ski Tour 2020	World Cup Final
2017	23	NC	NC	NC	48	—	—N/a	—
2018	24	77	62	NC	57	27	—N/a	—
2019	25	109	82	NC	38	—	—N/a	—
2020	26	84	71	NC	64	34	39	—N/a
2023	29				—N/a	DNF	—N/a	—N/a
