= Anna Nechaevskaya =

Russian cross-country skier

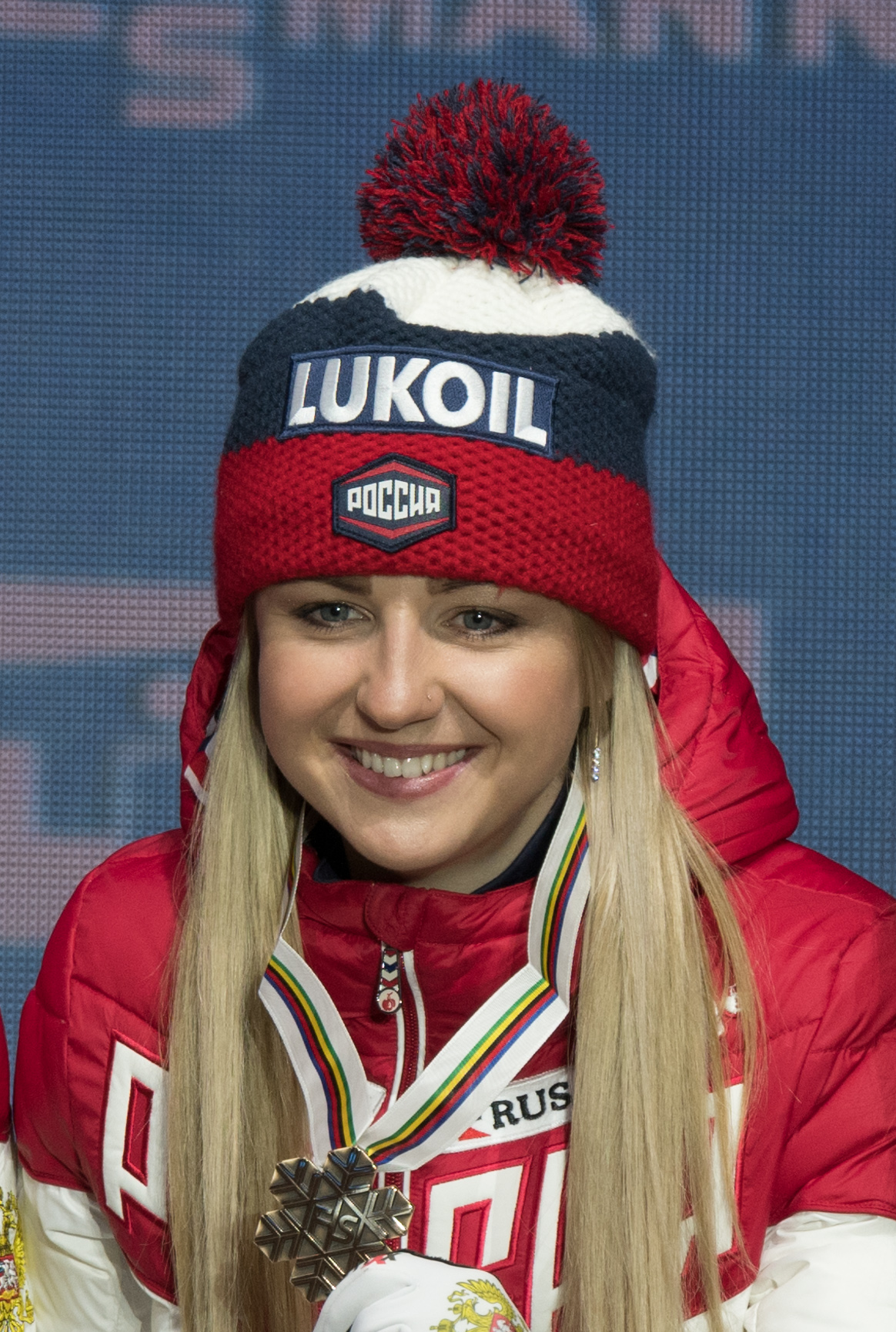
- Nechaevskaya in 2019

Personal information
- Nationality: Russia
- Born: 21 August 1991 (age 34) Tyoply Ruchey, Vologda Oblast, Soviet Union
- Height: 1.62 m (5 ft 4 in)

Sport
- Sport: Skiing

World Cup career
- Seasons: 7 – (2013, 2015, 2017–2021)
- Indiv. starts: 70
- Indiv. podiums: 0
- Team starts: 7
- Team podiums: 0
- Overall titles: 0 – (33rd in 2019)
- Discipline titles: 0
Medal record
Women's cross-country skiing
Representing Olympic Athletes from Russia
Olympic Games
Bronze medal – third place	2018 Pyeongchang	4 × 5 km relay
Representing Russia
World Championships
Bronze medal – third place	2019 Seefeld	4 × 5 km relay
Junior World Championships
Silver medal – second place	2011 Otepää	4 × 3.33 km relay
- Updated on 20 March 2022

Anna Alexandrovna Nechaevskaya (Russian: Анна Александровна Нечаевская, born 21 August 1991) is a Russian cross-country skier. She competed in the women's 10 kilometre freestyle at the 2018 Winter Olympics.

== Cross-country skiing results ==
All results are sourced from the International Ski Federation (FIS).

=== Olympic Games ===
- 1 medal – (1 bronze)

Year	Age	10 km individual	15 km skiathlon	30 km mass start	Sprint	4 × 5 km relay	Team sprint
2018	26	10	—	—	—	Bronze	—

=== World Championships ===
- 1 medal – (1 bronze)

Year	Age	10 km individual	15 km skiathlon	30 km mass start	Sprint	4 × 5 km relay	Team sprint
2019	27	—	15	17	—	Bronze	—

=== World Cup ===
==== Season standings ====
Season	Age	Discipline standings			Ski Tour standings			
Season	Age	Overall	Distance	Sprint	Nordic Opening	Tour de Ski	Ski Tour 2020	World Cup Final
2013	21	NC	NC	—	—	—	—N/a	—
2015	23	101	73	NC	60	34	—N/a	—N/a
2017	25	115	91	—	—	—	—N/a	—
2018	26	47	36	NC	37	12	—N/a	—
2019	27	33	26	NC	—	12	—N/a	—
2020	28	53	42	NC	—	29	28	—N/a
2021	29	38	32	NC	—	22	—N/a	—N/a
