= Cross-country skiing at the 1960 Winter Universiade =

Alpine skiing competition

Cross-country skiing at the I Winter Universiade
- Venue: French National Ski School
- Dates: 6 March 1960
- Competitors: 37 from 7 nations
- Teams: 7 in Men's event; 3 on Women's

Cross-country skiing at the 1960 Winter Universiade was held in Chamonix, France on 6 March 1960.

Event	Gold	Silver	Bronze
Men's Relay 4 x 8 km	Soviet Union (URS)	Czechoslovakia (TCH)	Poland (POL)
Women's Relay 3 x 4 km	Soviet Union (URS)	Czechoslovakia (TCH)	Poland (POL)

== Medal table ==
Rank	Nation	Gold	Silver	Bronze	Total
1	Soviet Union	2	0	0	2
2	Czechoslovakia	0	2	0	2
3	Poland	0	0	2	2
Totals (3 entries)		2	2	2	6
