= Lyubov Zabolotskaya =

Soviet cross-country skier

Personal information
- Nationality: Russia
- Born: 2 April 1956 (age 70) Sardyk, Soviet Union

Sport
- Sport: Skiing

World Cup career
- Seasons: 3 – (1982–1984)
- Indiv. starts: 5
- Indiv. podiums: 0
- Team starts: 1
- Team podiums: 1
- Team wins: 0
- Overall titles: 0 – (30th in 1983)
Medal record
Women's cross-country skiing
Representing Soviet Union
World Championships
Silver medal – second place	1982 Oslo	4 × 5 km relay

Lyubov Sergeyevna Zabolotskaya (Russian: Любо́вь Серге́евна Заболо́тская; born April 2, 1956, in the village of Sardyk of Kirov Oblast) is a former Soviet cross-country skier who competed during the early 1980s, being a member of the Soviet Team between 1978 and 1985. She won a silver medal in the 4 × 5 km relay at the 1982 FIS Nordic World Ski Championships in Oslo.

As a senior skier she competed for "Zenith" club of Moscow Oblast. She joined Soviet national team in 1978 at VI USSR National Winter Games (Russian: Зимняя спартакиада народов СССР). She never won gold of the Soviet National Championship, but she was the second in a 30 km race at the 1984 Soviet National Championship; several times she won bronze in 5 km and 10 km races in at 1981 and 1983. She was the absolute winner at Winter Universiade in 1981 and 1983. Zabolotskaya was also the winner of the 45th Prazdnik Severa (Russian: Праздник Севера) in Murmansk.

Since 1987 she works as a coach of the cross-country ski team of the Moscow Institute of Physics and Technology.

== Cross-country skiing results ==
All results are sourced from the International Ski Federation (FIS).

=== World Championships ===
- 1 medal – (1 silver)

Year	Age	5 km	10 km	20 km	4 × 5 km relay
1982	26	—	15	—	Silver

=== World Cup ===
==== Season standings ====
Season	Age	Overall
1982	26	31
1983	27	30
1984	28	60

==== Team podiums ====
- 1 podium

No.	Season	Date	Location	Race	Level	Place	Teammates
1	1981–82	24 February 1982	Oslo, Norway	4 × 5 km Relay	World Championships^{[1]}	2nd	Lyadova / Smetanina / Kulakova

Note: ^{1} Until the 1999 World Championships, World Championship races were included in the World Cup scoring system.
