= Sagan-Nur =

Sagan-Nur Саган-Нур
- Selo
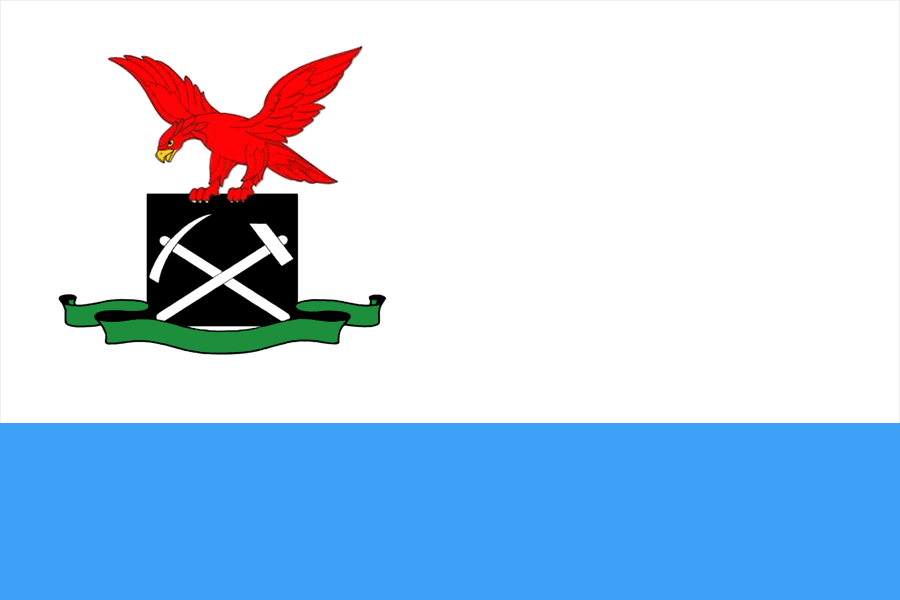
- Flag

- Location within Republic of Buryatia Location within Russia
- Coordinates: 51°20′N 108°26′E
- Country: Russia
- Region: Republic of Buryatia
- District: Mukhorshibirsky District
- Time zone: UTC+8:00

Sagan-Nur (Russian: Саган-Нур; Buryat: Сагаан Нуур, Sagaan Nuur) is a rural locality (a selo) in Mukhorshibirsky District, Republic of Buryatia, Russia. The population was 3,985 as of 2017. There are 56 streets.

== Geography ==
Sagan-Nur is located 73 km northeast of Mukhorshibir (the district's administrative centre) by road. Kusoty is the nearest rural locality.
