= Anton Gafarov =

Russian cross-country skier

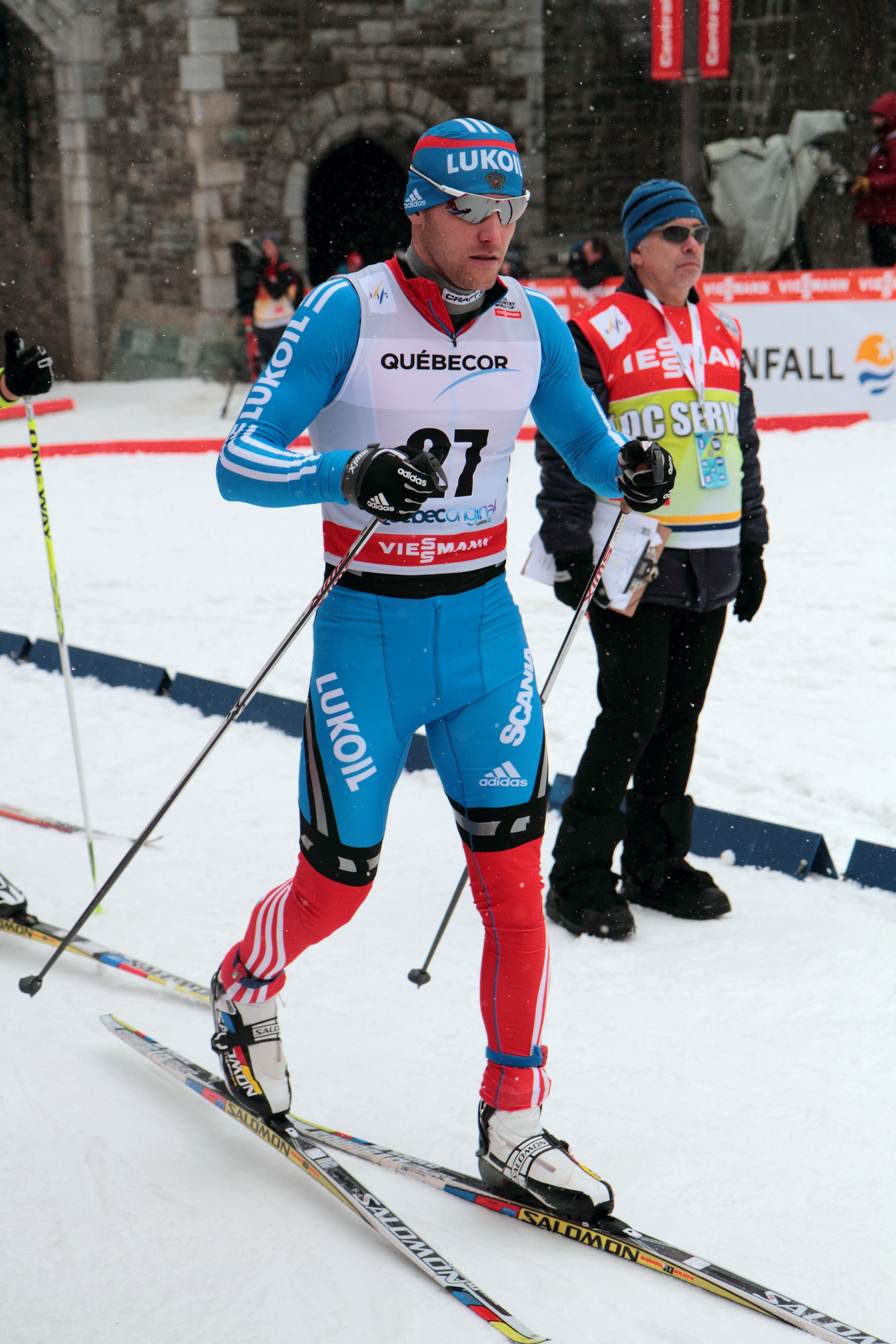

Personal information
- Full name: Anton Ildusovich Gafarov
- Nationality: Russia
- Born: 4 February 1987 (age 39) Khanty-Mansiysk, Russian SSR, Soviet Union

Sport
- Sport: Skiing

World Cup career
- Seasons: 10 – (2008–2009, 2011–2018)
- Indiv. starts: 54
- Indiv. podiums: 2
- Indiv. wins: 0
- Team starts: 4
- Team podiums: 0
- Overall titles: 0 – (41st in 2014)
- Discipline titles: 0
Medal record
Men's cross-country skiing
Representing Russia
Winter Universiade
Gold medal – first place	2015 Štrbské Pleso	Team sprint
Silver medal – second place	2015 Štrbské Pleso	Sprint
- Updated on 12 December 2021

Anton Ildusovich Gafarov (Russian: Антон Ильдусович Гафаров; born 4 February 1987) is a Russian cross-country skier who competed between 2008 and 2020. His best World Cup finish was second in a sprint event at Rukatunturi in November 2013.

Gafarov also finished 42nd in the sprint event at the FIS Nordic World Ski Championships 2009 in Liberec.

== Cross-country skiing results ==
All results are sourced from the International Ski Federation (FIS).

=== Olympic Games ===
Year	Age	15 km individual	30 km skiathlon	50 km mass start	Sprint	4 × 10 km relay	Team sprint
2014	27	—	—	—	12	—	—

=== World Championships ===
Year	Age	15 km individual	30 km skiathlon	50 km mass start	Sprint	4 × 10 km relay	Team sprint
2009	22	—	—	—	42	—	—
2017	30	—	—	—	17	—	—

=== World Cup ===
==== Season standings ====
Season	Age	Discipline standings			Ski Tour standings			
Season	Age	Overall	Distance	Sprint	Nordic Opening	Tour de Ski	World Cup Final	Ski Tour Canada
2008	21	126	—	86	—N/a	—	—	—N/a
2009	22	73	—	36	—N/a	—	—	—N/a
2011	24	127	—	76	—	—	—	—N/a
2012	25	63	NC	23	DNF	—	—	—N/a
2013	26	56	—	21	—	—	—	—N/a
2014	27	41	—	12	—	—	—	—N/a
2015	28	73	—	32	—	—	—N/a	—N/a
2016	29	84	—	44	—	—	—N/a	—
2017	30	75	—	31	—	—	—	—N/a
2018	31	105	—	52	—	—	—	—N/a

==== Individual podiums ====
- 2 podiums – (1 WC, 1 SWC)

No.	Season	Date	Location	Race	Level	Place
1	2008–09	31 January 2009	Rybinsk, Russia	1.3 km Sprint F	World Cup	3rd
2	2013–14	29 November 2013	Rukatunturi, Finland	1.4 km Sprint C	Stage World Cup	2nd
