= Cross-country skiing at the 2018 Winter Olympics – Women's 30 kilometre classical =

Women's 30 kilometre classical at the XXIII Olympic Winter Games
- Cross-country skiing
- Venue: Alpensia Cross-Country Skiing Centre
- Dates: 25 February 2018
- Competitors: 47 from 20 nations
- Winning time: 1:22:17.6

Medalists
1st place, gold medalist(s)		Marit Bjørgen	Norway
2nd place, silver medalist(s)		Krista Pärmäkoski	Finland
3rd place, bronze medalist(s)		Stina Nilsson	Sweden

The women's 30 kilometre classical cross-country skiing competition at the 2018 Winter Olympics was held on 25 February 2018 at 15:15 KST at the Alpensia Cross-Country Skiing Centre in Pyeongchang, South Korea. It became the final event of the 2018 Winter Olympics before the closing ceremonies.

== Qualification ==
A total of up to 310 cross-country skiers qualified across all eleven events. Athletes qualified for this event by having met the A qualification standard, which meant having 100 or less FIS Points in the distance classification. The Points list takes into average the best results of athletes per discipline during the qualification period (1 July 2016 to 21 January 2018). Countries received additional quotas by having athletes ranked in the top 30 of the FIS Olympics Points list (two per gender maximum, overall across all events). Countries also received an additional quota (one per gender maximum) if an athlete was ranked in the top 300 of the FIS Olympics Points list. After the distribution of B standard quotas, the remaining quotas were distributed using the Olympic FIS Points list, with each athlete only counting once for qualification purposes. A country could only enter a maximum of four athletes for the event.

== Competition schedule ==
All times are (UTC+9).

Date	Time	Event
25 February	15:15	Final

== Results ==
The race started at 15:15.

Rank	Bib	Name	Country	Time	Deficit
1st place, gold medalist(s)	8	Marit Bjørgen	Norway	1:22:17.6	—
2nd place, silver medalist(s)	7	Krista Pärmäkoski	Finland	1:24:07.1	+1:49.5
3rd place, bronze medalist(s)	19	Stina Nilsson	Sweden	1:24:16.5	+1:58.9
4	2	Ingvild Flugstad Østberg	Norway	1:24:18.0	+2:00.4
5	5	Charlotte Kalla	Sweden	1:25:14.8	+2:57.2
6	9	Kerttu Niskanen	Finland	1:25:19.2	+3:01.6
7	3	Jessie Diggins	United States	1:25:54.8	+3:37.2
8	1	Heidi Weng	Norway	1:26:25.5	+4:07.9
9	4	Teresa Stadlober	Austria	1:26:31.7	+4:14.1
10	24	Masako Ishida	Japan	1:26:38.4	+4:20.8
11	12	Anastasia Sedova	Olympic Athletes from Russia	1:26:46.8	+4:29.2
12	6	Ragnhild Haga	Norway	1:27:11.5	+4:53.9
13	17	Ebba Andersson	Sweden	1:27:14.8	+4:57.2
14	20	Justyna Kowalczyk	Poland	1:27:21.8	+5:04.2
15	27	Alisa Zhambalova	Olympic Athletes from Russia	1:27:27.2	+5:09.6
16	15	Stefanie Böhler	Germany	1:28:42.2	+6:24.6
17	11	Sadie Bjornsen	United States	1:28:50.2	+6:32.6
18	22	Johanna Matintalo	Finland	1:28:58.2	+6:40.6
19	18	Katharina Hennig	Germany	1:29:48.9	+7:31.3
20	16	Aino-Kaisa Saarinen	Finland	1:30:32.2	+8:14.6
21	32	Rosie Frankowski	United States	1:31:11.4	+8:53.8
22	10	Nathalie von Siebenthal	Switzerland	1:31:27.9	+9:10.3
23	25	Kateřina Beroušková	Czech Republic	1:31:41.4	+9:23.8
24	13	Natalya Nepryayeva	Olympic Athletes from Russia	1:32:10.4	+9:52.8
25	28	Victoria Carl	Germany	1:32:42.4	+10:24.8
26	23	Caitlin Patterson	United States	1:32:43.6	+10:26.0
27	21	Elisa Brocard	Italy	1:33:33.5	+11:15.9
28	39	Tatjana Mannima	Estonia	1:34:27.7	+12:10.1
29	14	Anna Haag	Sweden	1:34:31.0	+12:13.4
30	37	Emily Nishikawa	Canada	1:34:31.7	+12:14.1
31	29	Anna Shevchenko	Kazakhstan	1:35:36.1	+13:18.5
32	31	Valeriya Tyuleneva	Kazakhstan	1:35:38.0	+13:20.4
33	36	Elena Kolomina	Kazakhstan	1:35:38.4	+13:20.8
34	26	Anna Comarella	Italy	1:35:48.7	+13:31.1
35	30	Sara Pellegrini	Italy	1:36:07.3	+13:49.7
36	38	Alena Procházková	Slovakia	1:36:50.0	+14:32.4
37	40	Li Xin	China	1:38:04.9	+15:47.3
38	35	Tetyana Antypenko	Ukraine	1:38:17.3	+15:59.7
39	34	Petra Hynčicová	Czech Republic	1:39:14.7	+16:57.1
40	33	Polina Seronosova	Belarus	1:39:36.0	+17:18.4
41	43	Lucia Scardoni	Italy	1:40:26.3	+18:08.7
42	45	Jessica Yeaton	Australia	1:40:54.8	+18:37.2
43	41	Cendrine Browne	Canada	1:41:23.9	+19:06.3
44	42	Chi Chunxue	China	1:42:03.2	+19:45.6
45	46	Valiantsina Kaminskaya	Belarus	1:42:27.6	+20:10.0
	44	Yulia Tikhonova	Belarus	DNF	
	47	Anne-Marie Comeau	Canada	DNF	
