= Ewelina Marcisz =

Polish cross-country skier

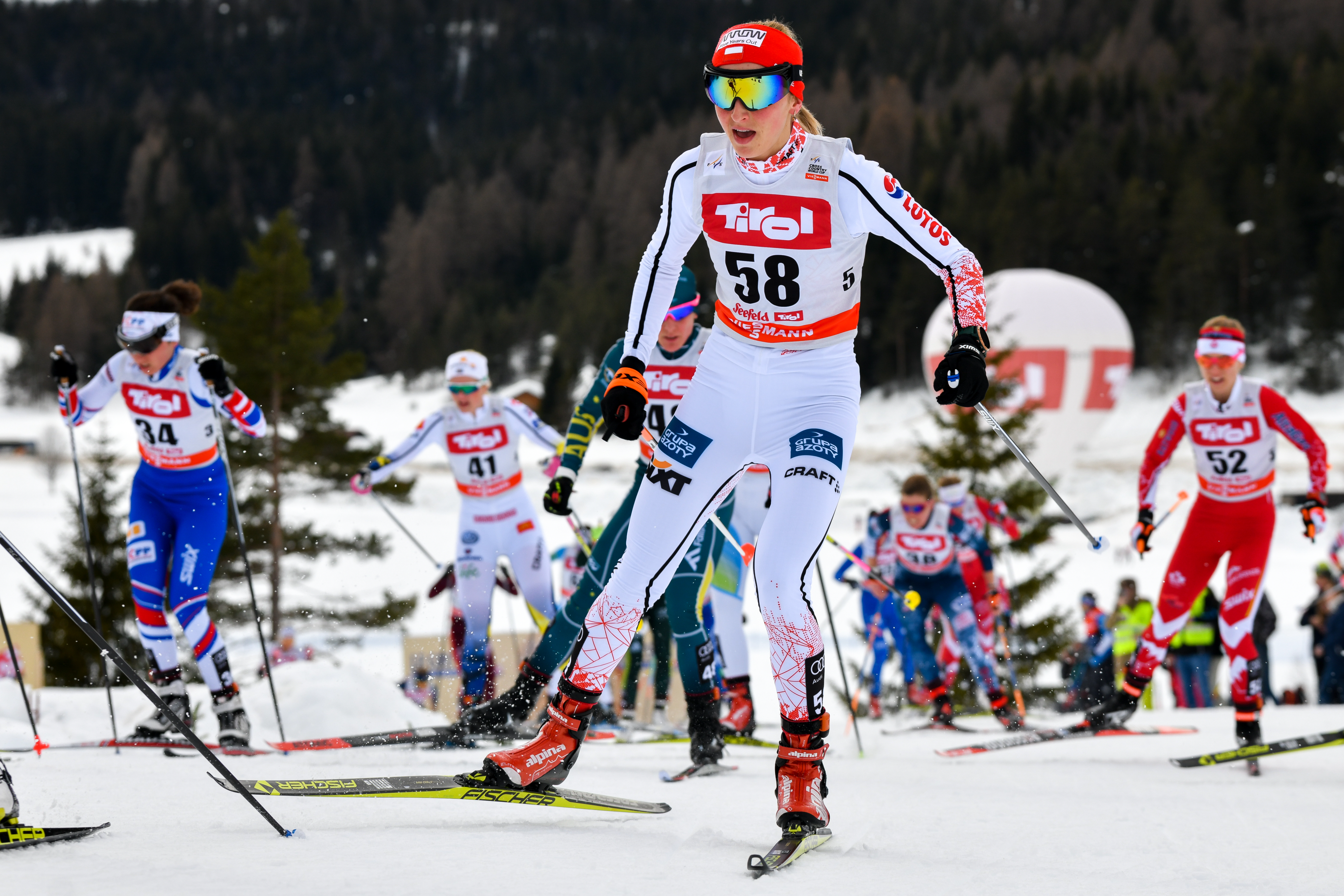

Personal information
- Nationality: Poland
- Born: 4 February 1991 (age 35) Krosno, Poland

Sport
- Sport: Skiing
- Club: MKS Halicz Ustrzyki Dolne

World Cup career
- Seasons: 7 – (2011–2015, 2017–2018)
- Indiv. starts: 46
- Indiv. podiums: 0
- Team starts: 5
- Team podiums: 0
- Overall titles: 0 – (108th in 2015)
- Discipline titles: 0

Ewelina Marcisz (born 4 February 1991) is a Polish cross-country skier. She competed in the World Cup 2015 season.

She represented Poland at the FIS Nordic World Ski Championships 2015 in Falun.

== Cross-country skiing results ==
All results are sourced from the International Ski Federation (FIS).

=== Olympic Games ===
Year	Age	10 km individual	15 km skiathlon	30 km mass start	Sprint	4 × 5 km relay	Team sprint
2018	27	42	31	—	38	10	—

=== World Championships ===
Year	Age	10 km individual	15 km skiathlon	30 km mass start	Sprint	4 × 5 km relay	Team sprint
2015	24	44	27	—	25	5	—
2017	26	42	—	—	52	8	9

=== World Cup ===
Season Standings
Season	Age	Discipline standings			Ski Tour standings		
Season	Age	Overall	Distance	Sprint	Nordic Opening	Tour de Ski	World Cup Final
2011	20	NC	NC	NC	59	—	—
2012	21	NC	NC	NC	66	DNF	—
2013	22	NC	—	NC	—	—	—
2014	23	115	87	NC	—	—	—
2015	24	108	80	75	40	—	—N/a
2017	26	NC	—	NC	—	—	—
2018	27	NC	NC	NC	65	—	—
