= Alexander Lasutkin =

Belarusian cross-country skier (born 1983)

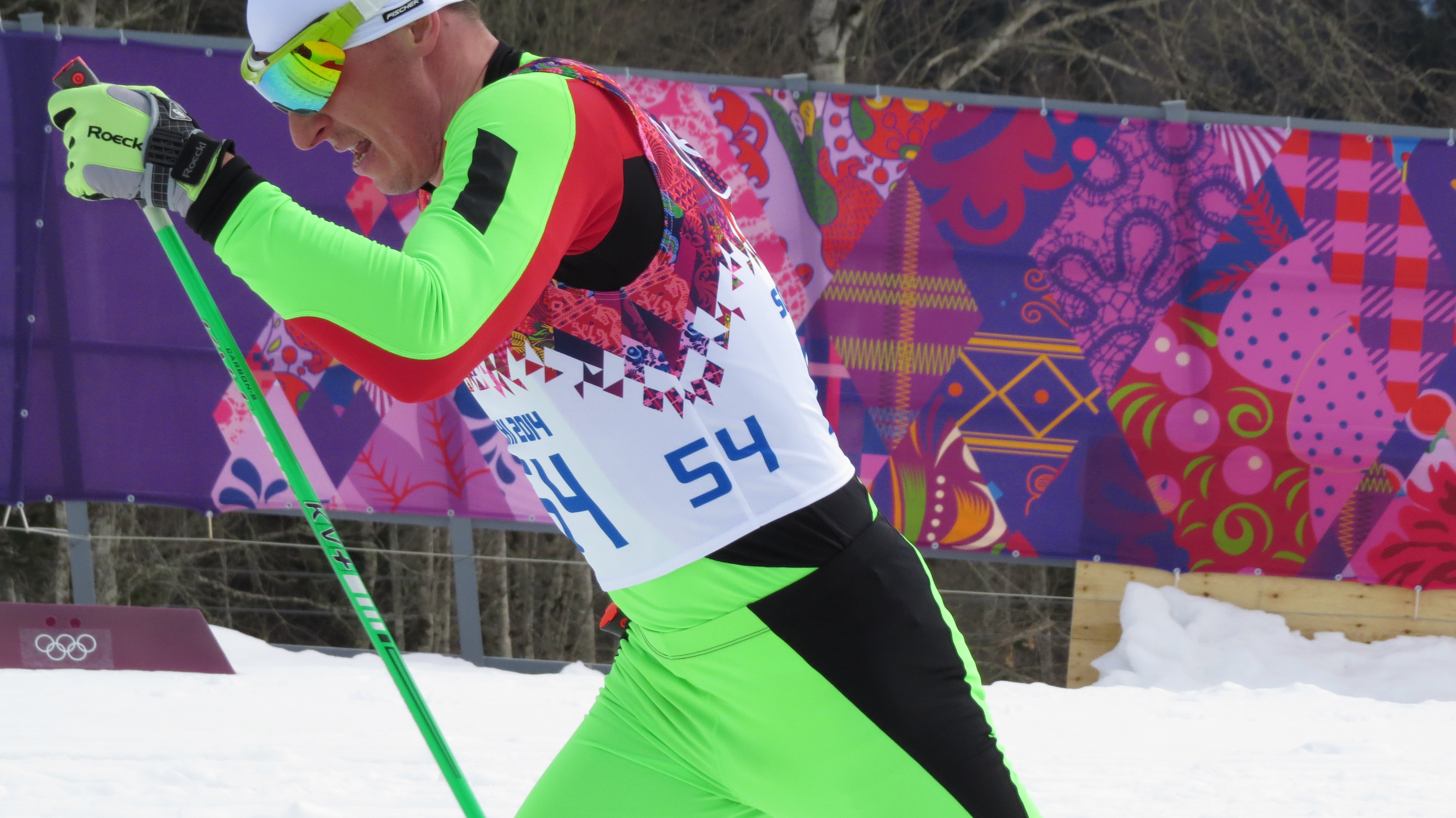

Personal information
- Born: June 26, 1983 (age 43)
- Height: 1.76 m (5 ft 9 in)
- Weight: 74 kg (163 lb)

Sport
- Country: Belarus
- Sport: Cross-country skiing

Alexander Lasutkin (born June 26, 1983) is a cross-country skier from Belarus. He competed for Belarus at the 2014 Winter Olympics in the cross country skiing events.
