= FIS Nordic World Ski Championships 2021 – Women's 30 kilometre classical =

Women's 30 kilometre classical at the FIS Nordic World Ski Championships 2021
- Location: Oberstdorf, Germany
- Date: 6 March
- Competitors: 50 from 18 nations
- Winning time: 1:24:56.3

Medalists
gold medal	Therese Johaug	Norway
silver medal	Heidi Weng	Norway
bronze medal	Frida Karlsson	Sweden

The Women's 30 kilometre classical competition at the FIS Nordic World Ski Championships 2021 was held on 6 March 2021.

== Results ==
The race was started at 12:30.

Rank	Bib	Athlete	Country	Time	Deficit
1st place, gold medalist(s)	2	Therese Johaug	Norway	1:24:56.3	
2nd place, silver medalist(s)	11	Heidi Weng	Norway	1:27:30.5	+2:34.2
3rd place, bronze medalist(s)	5	Frida Karlsson	Sweden	1:27:31.1	+2:34.8
4	1	Ebba Andersson	Sweden	1:27:32.6	+2:36.3
5	6	Teresa Stadlober	Austria	1:27:42.9	+2:46.6
6	23	Anne Kjersti Kalvå	Norway	1:28:26.5	+3:30.2
7	19	Tiril Udnes Weng	Norway	1:28:29.8	+3:33.5
8	8	Krista Pärmäkoski	Finland	1:28:38.0	+3:41.7
9	4	Tatiana Sorina	Russian Ski Federation	1:28:47.6	+3:51.3
10	32	Laura Gimmler	Germany	1:29:04.9	+4:08.6
11	24	Masako Ishida	Japan	1:29:07.6	+4:11.3
12	10	Yana Kirpichenko	Russian Ski Federation	1:29:29.0	+4:32.7
13	18	Johanna Matintalo	Finland	1:29:38.3	+4:42.0
14	16	Emma Ribom	Sweden	1:29:38.5	+4:42.2
15	20	Sadie Maubet Bjornsen	United States	1:29:38.7	+4:42.4
16	22	Laura Mononen	Finland	1:29:44.7	+4:48.4
17	14	Delphine Claudel	France	1:30:00.4	+5:04.1
18	3	Katharina Hennig	Germany	1:30:13.3	+5:17.0
19	9	Kateřina Razýmová	Czech Republic	1:30:20.5	+5:24.2
20	43	Mariya Istomina	Russian Ski Federation	1:30:26.7	+5:30.4
21	17	Anamarija Lampič	Slovenia	1:30:30.6	+5:34.3
22	33	Sofie Krehl	Germany	1:31:01.9	+6:05.6
23	25	Katherine Stewart-Jones	Canada	1:31:02.0	+6:05.7
24	29	Pia Fink	Germany	1:31:21.5	+6:25.2
25	7	Helene Marie Fossesholm	Norway	1:31:45.5	+6:49.2
26	15	Hailey Swirbul	United States	1:31:51.9	+6:55.6
27	36	Cendrine Browne	Canada	1:32:53.9	+7:57.6
28	40	Sophia Laukli	United States	1:32:57.0	+8:00.7
29	30	Vilma Nissinen	Finland	1:33:13.5	+8:17.2
30	27	Anna Shevchenko	Kazakhstan	1:33:20.2	+8:23.9
31	12	Alisa Zhambalova	Russian Ski Federation	1:33:22.1	+8:25.8
32	26	Petra Nováková	Czech Republic	1:33:26.3	+8:30.0
33	31	Valeriya Tyuleneva	Kazakhstan	1:33:53.2	+8:56.9
34	45	Dahria Beatty	Canada	1:34:57.3	+10:01.0
35	37	Masae Tsuchiya	Japan	1:35:34.5	+10:38.2
36	34	Petra Hynčicová	Czech Republic	1:36:00.8	+11:04.5
37	28	Katharine Ogden	United States	1:36:27.0	+11:30.7
38	13	Nadine Fähndrich	Switzerland	1:36:49.6	+11:53.3
39	35	Miki Kodama	Japan	1:37:47.5	+12:51.2
40	42	Irina Bykova	Kazakhstan	1:38:55.3	+13:59.0
41	41	Maryna Antsybor	Ukraine	1:39:07.2	+14:10.9
42	38	Valentyna Kaminska	Ukraine	1:42:59.1	+18:02.8
43	47	Lee Eui-jin	South Korea	1:44:57.8	+20:01.5
44	46	Nina Riedener	Liechtenstein	1:45:47.1	+20:50.8
45	49	Han Da-som	South Korea	1:47:50.7	+22:54.4
46	48	Viktoriya Olekh	Ukraine	1:48:45.3	+23:49.0
47	44	Yuliya Krol	Ukraine	Lapped	
48	50	Jaqueline Mourão	Brazil	Lapped	
	21	Charlotte Kalla	Sweden	Did not finish	
	39	Angelina Shuryga	Kazakhstan	Did not finish	
