= Cross-country skiing at the 2018 Winter Olympics – Women's 4 × 5 kilometre relay =

Women's 4 × 5 kilometre relay at the XXIII Olympic Winter Games
- Cross-country skiing
- Venue: Alpensia Cross-Country Skiing Centre
- Dates: 17 February 2018
- Competitors: 56 from 14 nations
- Winning time: 51:24.3

Medalists
1st place, gold medalist(s)		Ingvild Flugstad Østberg; Astrid Uhrenholdt Jacobsen; Ragnhild Haga; Marit Bjørgen	Norway
2nd place, silver medalist(s)		Anna Haag; Charlotte Kalla; Ebba Andersson; Stina Nilsson	Sweden
3rd place, bronze medalist(s)		Natalya Nepryayeva; Yuliya Belorukova; Anastasia Sedova; Anna Nechaevskaya	Olympic Athletes from Russia

The women's 4 × 5 kilometre relay cross-country skiing competition at the 2018 Winter Olympics was held on 17 February 2018 at 18:30 KST at the Alpensia Cross-Country Skiing Centre in Pyeongchang, South Korea. Norway won the event, with Sweden taking the silver medal and Olympic Athletes from Russia (OAR) bronze.

== Summary ==
In the first leg, OAR (Natalya Nepryayeva) and Norway (Ingvild Flugstad Østberg) skied together, with Finland (Aino-Kaisa Saarinen) trailing 20 seconds, Sweden (Anna Haag) 25 seconds after, and Switzerland fifth. In the second leg, Sweden (Charlotte Kalla) caught up with OAR (Yuliya Belorukova) and they skied together, but Norway (Astrid Uhrenholdt Jacobsen) dropped half a minute behind and was overtaken by Finland (Kerttu Niskanen), ten seconds behind the leaders. Switzerland (Nadine Fähndrich) was still fifth, but almost caught up with Norway. In the third leg, Norway (Ragnhild Haga) caught up with the leaders, Sweden (Ebba Andersson) and OAR (Anastasia Sedova). Finland was already 40 seconds behind, with other teams seemingly out of medal contention. In the last leg, Anna Nechaevskaya could not match the pace of the leaders, but Krista Pärmäkoski of Finland was not fast enough to make up forty seconds deficit, and OAR became third. At the finish line, Marit Bjørgen was faster than Stina Nilsson, thus winning gold for Norway.

In the victory ceremony, the medals were presented by Kristin Kloster Aasen, member of the International Olympic Committee, accompanied by Erik Røste, President of the Norwegian Ski Federation.

== Qualification ==
A total of up to 310 cross-country skiers qualified across all eleven events. Athletes qualified for this event by having met the A qualification standard, which meant having 100 or less FIS Points in either the sprint or distance classification. The Points list takes into average the best results of athletes per discipline during the qualification period (1 July 2016 to 21 January 2018). Countries received additional quotas by having athletes ranked in the top 30 of the FIS Olympics Points list (two per gender maximum, overall across all events). Countries also received an additional quota (one per gender maximum) if an athlete was ranked in the top 300 of the FIS Olympics Points list. After the distribution of B standard quotas, the remaining quotas were distributed using the Olympic FIS Points list, with each athlete only counting once for qualification purposes. A country could only enter the event if it had qualified at least four female athletes, and a country could enter only one team.

== Competition schedule ==
All times are (UTC+9).

Date	Time	Event
17 February	18:30	Final

== Results ==
The race was started at 18:30.

Rank	Bib	Country	Time	Deficit
1st place, gold medalist(s)	1	Norway; Ingvild Flugstad Østberg; Astrid Uhrenholdt Jacobsen; Ragnhild Haga; Marit Bjørgen	51:24.3; 13:28.9; 14:15.9; 11:46.7; 11:52.8	—
2nd place, silver medalist(s)	2	Sweden; Anna Haag; Charlotte Kalla; Ebba Andersson; Stina Nilsson	51:26.3; 13:50.3; 13:26.4; 12:11.4; 11:58.2	+2.0
3rd place, bronze medalist(s)	5	Olympic Athletes from Russia; Natalya Nepryayeva; Yuliya Belorukova; Anastasia Sedova; Anna Nechaevskaya	52:07.6; 13:24.5; 13:50.5; 12:13.4; 12:39.2	+43.3
4	3	Finland; Aino-Kaisa Saarinen; Kerttu Niskanen; Riitta-Liisa Roponen; Krista Pärmäkoski	52:26.9; 13:44.4; 13:40.7; 12:45.2; 12:16.6	+1:02.6
5	4	United States; Sophie Caldwell; Sadie Bjornsen; Kikkan Randall; Jessie Diggins	52:44.8; 14:26.0; 13:54.2; 12:12.9; 12:11.7	+1:20.5
6	6	Germany; Stefanie Böhler; Katharina Hennig; Victoria Carl; Sandra Ringwald	53:13.7; 14:16.4; 13:53.9; 12:37.9; 12:25.5	+1:49.4
7	7	Switzerland; Laurien van der Graaff; Nadine Fähndrich; Nathalie von Siebenthal; Lydia Hiernickel	53:15.8; 13:59.9; 13:46.8; 12:22.4; 13:06.7	+1:51.5
8	12	Slovenia; Anamarija Lampič; Katja Višnar; Alenka Čebašek; Vesna Fabjan	53:55.7; 13:28.4; 14:47.7; 12:22.1; 13:17.5	+2:31.4
9	9	Italy; Anna Comarella; Lucia Scardoni; Elisa Brocard; Ilaria Debertolis	54:22.0; 14:25.2; 14:19.9; 12:29.2; 13:07.7	+2:57.7
10	8	Poland; Ewelina Marcisz; Justyna Kowalczyk; Martyna Galewicz; Sylwia Jaśkowiec	54:30.9; 14:23.1; 14:13.0; 13:14.8; 12:40.0	+3:06.6
11	11	Czech Republic; Kateřina Beroušková; Karolína Grohová; Petra Nováková; Barbora Havlíčková	55:17.1; 14:06.2; 14:49.4; 12:45.3; 13:36.2	+3:52.8
12	13	France; Aurore Jéan; Anouk Faivre-Picon; Coraline Thomas Hugue; Delphine Claudel	55:50.2; 14:37.7; 14:43.7; 12:52.2; 13:36.6	+4:25.9
13	10	Canada; Dahria Beatty; Emily Nishikawa; Cendrine Browne; Anne-Marie Comeau	56:14.6; 15:00.2; 14:35.0; 12:53.7; 13:45.7	+4:50.3
14	14	Belarus; Anastasia Kirillova; Yulia Tikhonova; Polina Seronosova; Valiantsina Kaminskaya	57:56.1; 15:46.7; 14:47.3; 13:16.4; 14:05.7	+6:31.8
