= FIS Nordic World Ski Championships 2021 – Women's team sprint =

Women's team sprint at the FIS Nordic World Ski Championships 2021
- Location: Oberstdorf, Germany
- Date: 28 February
- Competitors: 56 from 28 nations
- Teams: 28
- Winning time: 16:27.94

Medalists
gold medal	Maja Dahlqvist; Jonna Sundling	Sweden
silver medal	Laurien van der Graaff; Nadine Fähndrich	Switzerland
bronze medal	Eva Urevc; Anamarija Lampič	Slovenia

The Women's team sprint competition at the FIS Nordic World Ski Championships 2021 was held on 28 February 2021.

== Results ==
=== Semifinals ===
==== Semifinal A ====
The semifinal was started at 11:28.

Rank	Bib	Country	Athletes	Time	Deficit	Notes
1	2	Sweden	Maja Dahlqvist; Jonna Sundling	15:47.88		Q
2	1	Russian Ski Federation	Yuliya Stupak; Natalya Nepryayeva	15:49.73	+1.85	Q
3	3	Norway	Tiril Udnes Weng; Maiken Caspersen Falla	15:50.58	+2.70	Q
4	5	Finland	Krista Pärmäkoski; Jasmi Joensuu	15:56.13	+8.25	Q
5	4	Italy	Lucia Scardoni; Greta Laurent	16:00.91	+13.03	
6	8	Canada	Dahria Beatty; Maya MacIsaac-Jones	16:19.71	+31.83	
7	9	China	Jialin Bayani; Dinigeer Yilamujiang	16:19.81	+31.93	
8	6	Poland	Izabela Marcisz; Monika Skinder	16:24.12	+36.24	
9	7	Kazakhstan	Anna Shevchenko; Darya Ryazhko	16:24.43	+36.55	
10	10	Croatia	Vedrana Malec; Tena Hadžić	17:53.62	+2:05.74	
11	11	South Korea	Han Da-som; Lee Eui-jin	18:14.36	+2:26.48	
12	13	Brazil	Jaqueline Mourão; Bruna Moura	19:25.01	+3:37.13	
13	14	Lithuania	Eglė Savickaitė; Ieva Dainytė	Lapped		
14	12	Greece	Maria Ntanou; Nefeli Tita	Lapped		

==== Semifinal B ====
The semifinal was started at 11:00.

Rank	Bib	Country	Athletes	Time	Deficit	Notes
1	18	Slovenia	Eva Urevc; Anamarija Lampič	15:51.90		Q
2	15	United States	Rosie Brennan; Sadie Maubet Bjornsen	15:51.97	+0.07	Q
3	16	Switzerland	Laurien van der Graaff; Nadine Fähndrich	15:52.33	+0.43	Q
4	19	Germany	Victoria Carl; Sofie Krehl	15:53.23	+1.33	Q
5	17	Czech Republic	Kateřina Razýmová; Kateřina Janatová	15:55.48	+3.58	q
6	20	France	Flora Dolci; Léna Quintin	15:59.42	+7.52	q
7	24	Slovakia	Alena Procházková; Barbora Klementová	16:37.03	+45.13	
8	21	Austria	Lisa Unterweger; Barbara Walchhofer	17:09.78	+1:17.88	
9	22	Ukraine	Maryna Antsybor; Valentyna Kaminska	17:10.62	+1:18.72	
10	25	Estonia	Aveli Uustalu; Johanna Udras	18:05.34	+2:13.44	
11	23	Serbia	Maida Drndić; Anja Ilić	18:14.33	+2:22.43	
12	27	Latvia	Kitija Auziņa; Samanta Krampe	18:24.10	+2:32.20	
13	26	Turkey	Ayşenur Duman; Seher Kaçmaz	19:10.79	+3:18.89	
14	28	Mongolia	Barsnyamyn Nomin-Erdene; Ariunsanaagiin Enkhtuul	Lapped		

=== Final ===
The final was started at 13:00.

Rank	Bib	Country	Athletes	Time	Deficit
1st place, gold medalist(s)	2	Sweden	Maja Dahlqvist; Jonna Sundling	16:27.94	
2nd place, silver medalist(s)	16	Switzerland	Laurien van der Graaff; Nadine Fähndrich	16:28.89	+0.95
3rd place, bronze medalist(s)	18	Slovenia	Eva Urevc; Anamarija Lampič	16:31.40	+3.46
4	1	Russian Ski Federation	Yuliya Stupak; Natalya Nepryayeva	16:31.89	+3.95
5	15	United States	Rosie Brennan; Sadie Maubet Bjornsen	16:33.77	+5.83
6	3	Norway	Tiril Udnes Weng; Maiken Caspersen Falla	16:46.88	+18.94
7	5	Finland	Krista Pärmäkoski; Jasmi Joensuu	16:52.20	+24.26
8	17	Czech Republic	Kateřina Razýmová; Kateřina Janatová	16:57.31	+29.37
9	19	Germany	Victoria Carl; Sofie Krehl	17:04.59	+36.65
10	20	France	Flora Dolci; Léna Quintin	17:31.74	+1:03.80
