= FIS Nordic World Ski Championships 2019 – Women's 15 kilometre pursuit =

Women's 15 kilometre pursuit at the FIS Nordic World Ski Championships 2019
- Location: Seefeld in Tirol, Austria
- Dates: 23 February
- Competitors: 58 from 23 nations
- Winning time: 36:54.5

Medalists
| gold medal | Therese Johaug | Norway |
| silver medal | Ingvild Flugstad Østberg | Norway |
| bronze medal | Natalya Nepryayeva | Russia |

The Women's 15 kilometre pursuit competition at the FIS Nordic World Ski Championships 2019 was held on 23 February 2019.

== Results ==
The race was started at 11:00.

| Rank | Bib | Athlete | Country | Time | Deficit |
|---|---|---|---|---|---|
| 1st place, gold medalist(s) | 2 | Therese Johaug | Norway | 36:54.5 | |
| 2nd place, silver medalist(s) | 1 | Ingvild Flugstad Østberg | Norway | 37:52.1 | +57.6 |
| 3rd place, bronze medalist(s) | 3 | Natalya Nepryayeva | Russia | 37:53.2 | +58.7 |
| 4 | 8 | Astrid Uhrenholdt Jacobsen | Norway | 37:56.5 | +1:02.0 |
| 5 | 17 | Frida Karlsson | Sweden | 38:01.9 | +1:07.4 |
| 6 | 6 | Charlotte Kalla | Sweden | 38:07.8 | +1:13.3 |
| 7 | 7 | Heidi Weng | Norway | 38:14.7 | +1:20.2 |
| 8 | 4 | Krista Pärmäkoski | Finland | 38:28.2 | +1:33.7 |
| 9 | 5 | Anastasia Sedova | Russia | 38:44.9 | +1:50.4 |
| 10 | 12 | Rosie Brennan | United States | 38:56.3 | +2:01.8 |
| 11 | 11 | Ida Ingemarsdotter | Sweden | 38:58.7 | +2:04.2 |
| 12 | 14 | Laura Mononen | Finland | 39:04.1 | +2:09.6 |
| 13 | 33 | Evelina Settlin | Sweden | 39:23.7 | +2:29.2 |
| 14 | 18 | Elisa Brocard | Italy | 39:30.7 | +2:36.2 |
| 15 | 13 | Anna Nechaevskaya | Russia | 39:31.4 | +2:36.9 |
| 16 | 15 | Katharina Hennig | Germany | 39:35.6 | +2:41.1 |
| 17 | 20 | Anna Comarella | Italy | 39:36.3 | +2:41.8 |
| 18 | 9 | Nathalie von Siebenthal | Switzerland | 39:39.1 | +2:44.6 |
| 19 | 35 | Julia Kern | United States | 39:50.0 | +2:55.5 |
| 20 | 16 | Anouk Faivre-Picon | France | 39:52.0 | +2:57.5 |
| 21 | 10 | Mariya Istomina | Russia | 39:53.0 | +2:58.5 |
| 22 | 32 | Jessica Yeaton | Australia | 39:53.4 | +2:58.9 |
| 23 | 31 | Eveliina Piippo | Finland | 39:54.1 | +2:59.6 |
| 24 | 30 | Rosie Frankowski | United States | 39:55.1 | +3:00.6 |
| 25 | 46 | Sofie Krehl | Germany | 40:07.6 | +3:13.1 |
| 26 | 29 | Polina Seronosova | Belarus | 40:17.0 | +3:22.5 |
| 27 | 42 | Izabela Marcisz | Poland | 40:17.9 | +3:23.4 |
| 28 | 41 | Petra Nováková | Czech Republic | 40:18.8 | +3:24.3 |
| 29 | 38 | Kateřina Razýmová | Czech Republic | 40:19.0 | +3:24.5 |
| 30 | 22 | Pia Fink | Germany | 40:19.1 | +3:24.6 |
| 31 | 40 | Delphine Claudel | France | 40:30.6 | +3:36.1 |
| 32 | 25 | Johanna Matintalo | Finland | 40:35.9 | +3:41.4 |
| 33 | 26 | Caterina Ganz | Italy | 40:39.3 | +3:44.8 |
| 34 | 19 | Caitlin Patterson | United States | 40:49.0 | +3:54.5 |
| 35 | 21 | Sara Pellegrini | Italy | 40:49.0 | +3:54.5 |
| 36 | 27 | Alenka Čebašek | Slovenia | 40:59.4 | +4:04.9 |
| 37 | 28 | Valeriya Tyuleneva | Kazakhstan | 41:10.0 | +4:15.5 |
| 38 | 50 | Li Xin | China | 41:11.8 | +4:17.3 |
| 39 | 37 | Catherine Stewart-Jones | Canada | 41:14.3 | +4:19.8 |
| 40 | 44 | Cendrine Browne | Canada | 41:19.7 | +4:25.2 |
| 41 | 24 | Anna Shevchenko | Kazakhstan | 41:22.3 | +4:27.8 |
| 42 | 36 | Tetyana Antypenko | Ukraine | 41:24.8 | +4:30.3 |
| 43 | 23 | Laura Chamiot-Maitral | France | 41:49.9 | +4:55.4 |
| 44 | 34 | Sandra Schützová | Czech Republic | 42:16.5 | +5:22.0 |
| 45 | 55 | Chi Chunxue | China | 42:58.2 | +6:03.7 |
| 46 | 43 | Irina Bykova | Kazakhstan | 43:18.4 | +6:23.9 |
| 47 | 49 | Viktoriya Olekh | Ukraine | 43:30.6 | +6:36.1 |
| 48 | 48 | Urszula Łętocha | Poland | 43:32.6 | +6:38.1 |
| 49 | 53 | Weronika Kaleta | Poland | 43:41.1 | +6:46.6 |
| 50 | 45 | Kozue Takizawa | Japan | 43:50.5 | +6:56.0 |
| 51 | 58 | Karen Chanloung | Thailand | 44:07.5 | +7:13.0 |
| 52 | 47 | Sumiko Ishigaki | Japan | 44:16.6 | +7:22.1 |
| 53 | 51 | Vedrana Malec | Croatia | 44:27.4 | +7:32.9 |
| 54 | 54 | Maya MacIsaac-Jones | Canada | 45:47.9 | +8:53.4 |
| 55 | 59 | Aimee Watson | Australia | 46:33.2 | +9:38.7 |
| 56 | 56 | Katya Galstyan | Armenia | 46:53.4 | +9:58.9 |
| 57 | 60 | Melina Meyer Magulas | Greece | 49:17.7 | +12:23.2 |
| 58 | 57 | Maria Ntanou | Greece | Lapped | |
| | 39 | Marina Matrossova | Kazakhstan | Did not start | |
| | 52 | Barbara Jezeršek | Australia | Did not start | |
