= Cross-country skiing at the 2026 Winter Olympics – Men's 20 kilometre skiathlon =

Men's 20 kilometre skiathlon at the XXV Olympic Winter Games
- Cross-country skiing
- Venue: Cross country and biathlon center Fabio Canal, Tesero
- Date: 8 February 2026
- Competitors: 75 from 38 nations
- Winning time: 46:11.0

Medalists
1st place, gold medalist(s)		Johannes Høsflot Klæbo	Norway
2nd place, silver medalist(s)		Mathis Desloges	France
3rd place, bronze medalist(s)		Martin Løwstrøm Nyenget	Norway

The men's 20 kilometre skiathlon competition in cross-country skiing at the 2026 Winter Olympics was held on 8 February, at the Cross country and biathlon center Fabio Canal in Tesero. Johannes Høsflot Klæbo of Norway won the event, becoming thereby a sixfold Olympic champion. Mathis Desloges of France became the silver medalist, and Martin Løwstrøm Nyenget of Norway won bronze, the first Olympic medals for both of them. Desloges was given a warning after cutting straight across a course marker while rounding a lap near the 13-km mark but he kept his medal after lengthy jury deliberations that delayed the official results at the end of the race.

== Background ==
At the previous Olympics, the men's skiathlon was 30 km, and for the 2026 Games it was shortened to 20 km because FIS decided to match men's and women's event distances. The 2022 champion, Alexander Bolshunov, and the silver medalist, Denis Spitsov, were not allowed to participate because skiers from Russia could only participate as individual neutral athletes, and they did not obtain this status. The bronze medalist, Iivo Niskanen, qualified for the event. Johannes Høsflot Klæbo was leading both overall and distance standings of the FIS Cross-Country World Cup before the Olympics; he also won the only skiathlon which took place during the season. He was the 2025 world champion in skiathlon as well.

== Results ==
The race was started at 12:30.

Rank	Bib	Name	Country	10 km classic	Rank	Pitstop	10 km free	Rank	Finish time	Deficit
1st place, gold medalist(s)	1	Johannes Høsflot Klæbo	Norway	23:22.6	2	25.9	22:22.5	2	46:11.0	
2nd place, silver medalist(s)	9	Mathis Desloges	France	23:25.3	7	26.6	22:21.1	1	46:13.0	+2.0
3rd place, bronze medalist(s)	4	Martin Løwstrøm Nyenget	Norway	23:22.1	1	28.2	22:22.8	3	46:13.1	+2.1
4	15	Savelii Korostelev	Individual Neutral Athletes	23:24.7	6	26.3	22:23.6	4	46:14.6	+3.6
5	6	Hugo Lapalus	France	23:24.6	5	25.9	22:24.8	6	46:15.3	+4.3
6	2	Harald Østberg Amundsen	Norway	23:24.3	4	25.5	22:51.6	14	46:41.4	+30.4
7	29	Truls Gisselman	Sweden	23:27.4	8	28.8	22:51.6	14	46:47.8	+36.8
8	19	Davide Graz	Italy	24:04.2	11	27.9	22:27.9	8	47:00.0	+49.0
9	13	Jules Lapierre	France	24:04.7	12	26.5	22:29.1	9	47:00.3	+49.3
10	17	Andrew Musgrave	Great Britain	24:05.2	13	28.8	22:26.5	7	47:00.5	+49.5
11	10	Arsi Ruuskanen	Finland	24:05.7	14	31.1	22:24.1	5	47:00.9	+49.9
12	16	William Poromaa	Sweden	24:09.1	20	26.5	22:46.5	13	47:22.1	+1:11.1
13	35	Xavier McKeever	Canada	24:07.0	17	30.3	22:45.0	12	47:22.3	+1:11.3
14	5	Elia Barp	Italy	24:24.4	25	27.7	22:30.4	10	47:22.5	+1:11.5
15	20	Victor Lovera	France	24:12.6	23	28.4	22:42.1	11	47:23.1	+1:12.1
16	31	Joe Davies	Great Britain	24:08.0	19	28.6	22:59.3	16	47:35.9	+1:24.9
17	12	Iivo Niskanen	Finland	23:49.7	9	30.4	23:32.5	25	47:52.6	+1:41.6
18	28	Niko Anttola	Finland	24:06.4	16	32.7	23:16.9	19	47:56.0	+1:45.0
19	21	Michal Novák	Czech Republic	23:56.4	10	28.0	23:37.8	27	48:02.2	+1:51.2
20	11	Federico Pellegrino	Italy	24:26.7	29	31.0	23:04.8	17	48:02.5	+1:51.5
21	3	Mattis Stenshagen	Norway	23:23.8	3	28.6	24:11.3	37	48:03.7	+1:52.7
22	40	Ryo Hirose	Japan	24:06.0	15	27.4	23:41.4	28	48:14.8	+2:03.8
23	26	Martino Carollo	Italy	24:38.9	32	30.7	23:17.9	20	48:27.5	+2:16.5
24	14	Gus Schumacher	United States	24:33.0	31	28.2	23:26.3	23	48:27.5	+2:16.5
25	24	Antoine Cyr	Canada	24:07.5	18	30.4	23:53.0	30	48:30.9	+2:19.9
26	18	Friedrich Moch	Germany	24:10.5	22	31.6	23:54.2	31	48:36.3	+2:25.3
27	42	Maximillian Hollmann	Canada	24:39.8	34	34.2	23:23.0	21	48:37.0	+2:26.0
28	25	Florian Notz	Germany	24:31.8	30	28.4	23:37.5	26	48:37.7	+2:26.7
29	39	Matyáš Bauer	Czech Republic	24:10.0	21	30.0	24:01.2	33	48:41.2	+2:30.2
30	41	Nicola Wigger	Switzerland	24:23.7	24	25.5	24:01.9	34	48:51.1	+2:40.1
31	44	Hunter Wonders	United States	24:26.2	28	32.3	24:03.6	35	49:02.1	+2:51.1
32	34	Dominik Bury	Poland	25:14.0	40	27.9	23:23.8	22	49:05.7	+2:54.7
33	43	Jakob Moch	Germany	25:24.6	41	28.9	23:15.4	18	49:08.9	+2:57.9
34	33	Naoto Baba	Japan	24:52.8	36	31.8	23:45.3	29	49:09.9	+2:58.9
35	36	Thomas Maloney Westgård	Ireland	24:57.2	37	31.1	23:56.3	32	49:24.6	+3:13.6
36	38	Zanden McMullen	United States	24:25.7	27	38.2	24:22.4	40	49:26.3	+3:15.3
37	8	Edvin Anger	Sweden	25:26.7	43	29.4	23:30.7	24	49:26.8	+3:15.8
38	30	Alvar Johannes Alev	Estonia	24:43.5	35	28.0	24:16.2	38	49:27.7	+3:16.7
39	22	Gustaf Berglund	Sweden	24:25.1	26	31.6	24:31.3	44	49:28.0	+3:17.0
40	46	Mike Ophoff	Czech Republic	24:39.3	33	31.7	24:18.9	39	49:29.9	+3:18.9
41	7	Mika Vermeulen	Austria	24:58.0	38	31.0	24:31.7	45	50:00.7	+3:49.7
42	37	Rémi Drolet	Canada	25:26.9	44	29.0	24:26.1	42	50:22.0	+4:11.0
43	23	Zak Ketterson	United States	25:26.1	42	31.9	24:25.5	41	50:23.5	+4:12.5
44	45	Daito Yamazaki	Japan	25:50.6	49	29.3	24:11.0	36	50:30.9	+4:19.9
45	57	Amirgali Muratbekov	Kazakhstan	25:29.8	47	35.5	24:33.7	46	50:39.0	+4:28.0
46	32	Beda Klee	Switzerland	25:13.4	39	26.6	24:59.0	50	50:39.0	+4:28.0
47	51	Sebastian Bryja	Poland	25:49.6	48	30.9	24:45.1	48	51:05.6	+4:54.6
48	58	Mikayel Mikayelyan	Armenia	26:07.2	51	30.0	24:29.6	43	51:06.8	+4:55.8
49	56	Nail Bashmakov	Kazakhstan	25:54.6	50	28.5	24:49.5	49	51:12.6	+5:01.6
50	49	Paul Pepene	Romania	26:07.9	52	32.1	24:38.2	47	51:18.2	+5:07.2
51	47	Raimo Vīgants	Latvia	25:29.2	46	35.4	25:57.2	54	52:01.8	+5:50.8
52	27	Ristomatti Hakola	Finland	25:27.4	45	33.0	26:11.2	57	52:11.6	+6:00.6
53	48	Oleksandr Lisohor	Ukraine	26:22.9	54	32.4	25:49.9	53	52:45.2	+6:34.2
54	59	Gabriel Cojocaru	Romania	26:48.0	60	32.9	25:39.3	51	53:00.2	+6:49.2
55	62	Batmönkhiin Achbadrakh	Mongolia	26:09.7	53	44.1	26:12.4	59	53:06.2	+6:55.2
56	54	Hugo Hinckfuss	Australia	26:45.7	59	34.3	26:01.6	56	53:21.6	+7:10.6
57	55	Seve de Campo	Australia	26:42.4	58	29.2	26:12.5	60	53:24.1	+7:13.1
58	66	Lee Joon-seo	South Korea	26:25.7	55	32.1	26:41.2	63	53:39.0	+7:28.0
59	63	Dmytro Drahun	Ukraine	27:11.1	61	30.8	26:01.1	55	53:43.0	+7:32.0
60	53	Peter Hinds	Slovakia	27:24.8	63	33.1	25:46.8	52	53:44.7	+7:33.7
61	52	Franco Dal Farra	Argentina	26:39.2	57	33.8	26:35.3	62	53:48.3	+7:37.3
62	61	Mario Matikanov	Bulgaria	27:21.0	62	31.3	26:12.1	58	54:04.4	+7:53.4
63	67	Ádám Kónya	Hungary	27:25.5	64	32.7	26:14.6	61	54:12.8	+8:01.8
64	71	Stevenson Savart	Haiti	27:29.7	65	38.3	28:44.8	64	56:52.8	+10:41.8
65	60	Li Minglin	China	27:50.6	66	32.8	Lapped			
66	50	Dagur Benediktsson	Iceland	27:57.8	67	34.5	Lapped			
67	75	Mateo Sauma	Argentina	28:52.8	69	34.5	Lapped			
68	74	Ádám Büki	Hungary	29:14.5	71	29.6	Lapped			
69	64	Fredrik Fodstad	Colombia	28:50.0	68	36.2	Lapped			
70	70	Tautvydas Strolia	Lithuania	29:11.9	70	34.8	Lapped			
71	68	Mark Chanloung	Thailand	29:22.2	72	29.4	Lapped			
72	69	Sebastián Endrestad	Chile	29:26.8	73	40.2	Lapped			
73	72	Timo Juhani Grönlund	Bolivia	29:42.3	74	35.8	Lapped			
	65	Daniel Peshkov	Bulgaria	26:29.7	56	35.8	Did not finish			
	73	Apostolos Angelis	Greece	Did not start						
