= Cross-country skiing at the 2026 Winter Olympics – Men's 10 kilometre freestyle =

Men's 10 kilometre freestyle at the XXV Olympic Winter Games
- Cross-country skiing
- Venue: Cross country and biathlon center Fabio Canal, Tesero
- Date: 13 February 2026
- Competitors: 113 from 63 nations
- Winning time: 20:36.2

Medalists
1st place, gold medalist(s)		Johannes Høsflot Klæbo	Norway
2nd place, silver medalist(s)		Mathis Desloges	France
3rd place, bronze medalist(s)		Einar Hedegart	Norway

The men's 10 kilometre freestyle competition in cross-country skiing at the 2026 Winter Olympics was held on 13 February, at the Cross country and biathlon center Fabio Canal in Tesero. This was the first time men's 10 kilometres is contested at the Olympics since 1998. The distance replaces the men's 15 kilometre, contested previously. The event was won by Johannes Høsflot Klæbo of Norway which was his third gold medal at the 2026 Olympics and eighth overall. Mathis Desloges of France won silver. Einar Hedegart of Norway won the bronze medal, his first Olympic medal.

== Background ==
At the previous Olympics, the interval start race was 15 km; it was shortened to 10 km for the 2026 Winter Olympics by FIS to match men's and women's event distances. The 2022 champion Iivo Niskanen and the bronze medalist Johannes Høsflot Klæbo, qualified for the event; however, Niskanen did not participate. The silver medalist, Alexander Bolshunov was not allowed to participate because skiers from Russia could only participate as individual neutral athletes, and he did not obtain this status. Klæbo was leading both overall and distance standings of the FIS Cross-Country World Cup before the Olympics. He was also the 2025 world champion in the event.

== Results ==
The race was started at 11:45.

Rank	Bib	Name	Country	Time	Deficit
1st place, gold medalist(s)	44	Johannes Høsflot Klæbo	Norway	20:36.2	
2nd place, silver medalist(s)	46	Mathis Desloges	France	20:41.1	+4.9
3rd place, bronze medalist(s)	62	Einar Hedegart	Norway	20:50.2	+14.0
4	58	Harald Østberg Amundsen	Norway	21:00.2	+24.0
5	60	Martin Løwstrøm Nyenget	Norway	21:03.5	+27.3
6	42	Andrew Musgrave	Great Britain	21:06.3	+30.1
7	32	Martino Carollo	Italy	21:15.8	+39.6
8	48	Hugo Lapalus	France	21:27.3	+51.1
9	23	Thomas Stephen	Canada	21:30.3	+54.1
10	38	Victor Lovera	France	21:32.4	+56.2
11	37	Michal Novák	Czech Republic	21:37.2	+1:01.0
12	27	Joe Davies	Great Britain	21:40.2	+1:04.0
13	15	Matyáš Bauer	Czech Republic	21:40.8	+1:04.6
14	21	John Hagenbuch	United States	21:41.1	+1:04.9
15	70	Savelii Korostelev	Individual Neutral Athletes	21:42.3	+1:06.1
16	64	Jules Lapierre	France	21:43.9	+1:07.7
17	28	Simone Daprà	Italy	21:47.5	+1:11.3
18	68	Arsi Ruuskanen	Finland	21:50.6	+1:14.4
19	17	Rémi Drolet	Canada	21:50.8	+1:14.6
20	40	William Poromaa	Sweden	21:51.6	+1:15.4
21	26	Beda Klee	Switzerland	21:52.3	+1:16.1
22	33	Florian Notz	Germany	21:53.0	+1:16.8
23	11	Max Hollmann	Canada	21:56.9	+1:20.7
24	12	Nicola Wigger	Switzerland	21:57.1	+1:20.9
25	31	Niko Anttola	Finland	22:02.3	+1:26.1
26	36	Benjamin Moser	Austria	22:05.4	+1:29.2
27	52	Mika Vermeulen	Austria	22:07.6	+1:31.4
28	29	Alvar Johannes Alev	Estonia	22:10.2	+1:34.0
29	50	Gustaf Berglund	Sweden	22:13.2	+1:37.0
30	8	Daito Yamazaki	Japan	22:14.6	+1:38.4
31	24	Dominik Bury	Poland	22:14.7	+1:38.5
32	16	Zanden McMullen	United States	22:17.7	+1:41.5
33	14	Ryo Hirose	Japan	22:18.9	+1:42.7
34	18	James Clugnet	Great Britain	22:20.5	+1:44.3
35	25	Naoto Baba	Japan	22:21.5	+1:45.3
36	19	Martin Himma	Estonia	22:21.6	+1:45.4
37	39	Friedrich Moch	Germany	22:25.0	+1:48.8
38	35	Zak Ketterson	United States	22:28.4	+1:52.2
39	66	Gus Schumacher	United States	22:30.8	+1:54.6
40	30	Truls Gisselman	Sweden	22:34.9	+1:58.7
41	56	Davide Graz	Italy	22:35.7	+1:59.5
42	54	Edvin Anger	Sweden	22:35.8	+1:59.6
43	51	Amirgali Muratbekov	Kazakhstan	22:38.2	+2:02.0
44	34	Janosch Brugger	Germany	22:46.6	+2:10.4
45	5	Mike Ophoff	Czech Republic	22:47.1	+2:10.9
46	4	Raimo Vīgants	Latvia	22:48.3	+2:12.1
47	9	Emil Liekari	Finland	22:49.4	+2:13.2
48	22	Joni Mäki	Finland	22:55.1	+2:18.9
49	43	Mario Matikanov	Bulgaria	23:00.5	+2:24.3
50	6	Vili Črv	Slovenia	23:04.4	+2:28.2
51	10	Miha Šimenc	Slovenia	23:04.6	+2:28.4
52	1	Paul Pepene	Romania	23:04.9	+2:28.7
53	49	Mikayel Mikayelyan	Armenia	23:06.4	+2:30.2
54	20	Thomas Maloney Westgård	Ireland	23:08.0	+2:31.8
55	13	Jiří Tuž	Czech Republic	23:13.4	+2:37.2
56	67	Sebastian Bryja	Poland	23:14.6	+2:38.4
57	57	Vitaliy Pukhkalo	Kazakhstan	23:25.9	+2:49.7
58	65	Franco Dal Farra	Argentina	23:26.0	+2:49.8
59	7	Noe Näff	Switzerland	23:27.5	+2:51.3
60	2	Oleksandr Lisohor	Ukraine	23:27.8	+2:51.6
61	55	Seve de Campo	Australia	23:30.3	+2:54.1
62	3	Nejc Štern	Slovenia	23:38.4	+3:02.2
63	80	Strahinja Erić	Bosnia and Herzegovina	23:40.4	+3:04.2
64	63	Peter Hinds	Slovakia	23:40.8	+3:04.6
65	47	Gabriel Cojocaru	Romania	23:43.3	+3:07.1
66	59	Hugo Hinckfuss	Australia	23:43.4	+3:07.2
67	74	Daniel Peshkov	Bulgaria	23:54.8	+3:18.6
68	76	Simone Mocellini	Italy	24:00.8	+3:24.6
69	69	Dagur Benediktsson	Iceland	24:18.1	+3:41.9
70	73	Lars Young Vik	Australia	24:19.3	+3:43.1
71	71	Dmytro Drahun	Ukraine	24:20.3	+3:44.1
72	82	Ádám Kónya	Hungary	24:22.9	+3:46.7
73	75	Lee Joon-seo	South Korea	24:25.4	+3:49.2
74	53	Nail Bashmakov	Kazakhstan	24:27.8	+3:51.6
75	77	Niks Saulītis	Latvia	24:33.4	+3:57.2
76	61	Lauris Kaparkalējs	Latvia	24:36.2	+4:00.0
77	86	Mark Chanloung	Thailand	24:42.8	+4:06.6
78	45	Li Minglin	China	24:52.6	+4:16.4
79	89	Stevenson Savart	Haiti	24:59.4	+4:23.2
80	91	Apostolos Angelis	Greece	25:05.0	+4:28.8
81	84	Maciej Staręga	Poland	25:07.1	+4:30.9
82	90	Timo Juhani Grönlund	Bolivia	25:15.5	+4:39.3
83	79	Stavre Jada	North Macedonia	25:28.9	+4:52.7
84	88	Tautvydas Strolia	Lithuania	25:30.0	+4:53.8
85	41	Batmönkhiin Achbadrakh	Mongolia	25:32.8	+4:56.6
86	96	Ádám Büki	Hungary	25:36.2	+5:00.0
87	85	Aleksandar Grbović	Montenegro	25:45.8	+5:09.6
88	83	Miloš Milosavljević	Serbia	25:46.5	+5:10.3
89	97	Mateo Sauma	Argentina	25:58.1	+5:21.9
90	93	Tomáš Cenek	Slovakia	26:07.9	+5:31.7
91	81	Robin Frommelt	Liechtenstein	26:08.1	+5:31.9
92	87	Sebastián Endrestad	Chile	26:21.0	+5:44.8
93	109	Danyal Saveh Shemshaki	Iran	26:30.8	+5:54.6
94	92	Samuel Ikpefan	Nigeria	26:38.4	+6:02.2
95	95	Marko Skender	Croatia	26:40.7	+6:04.5
96	100	Iulian Luchin	Moldova	26:51.0	+6:14.8
97	103	Manex Silva	Brazil	26:51.4	+6:15.2
98	101	Nicolas Claveau-Laviolette	Venezuela	26:59.8	+6:23.6
99	98	José Cabeça	Portugal	27:00.8	+6:24.6
100	94	Abdullah Yılmaz	Turkey	27:08.3	+6:32.1
101	72	Fredrik Fodstad	Colombia	27:35.3	+6:59.1
102	105	Artur Saparbekov	Kyrgyzstan	27:46.9	+7:10.7
103	108	Abderrahim Kemmissa	Morocco	27:54.5	+7:18.3
104	111	Stanzin Lundup	India	28:26.7	+7:50.5
105	104	Allan Corona	Mexico	28:33.9	+7:57.7
106	102	Lee Chieh-han	Chinese Taipei	28:39.3	+8:03.1
107	113	Samer Tawk	Lebanon	29:50.1	+9:13.9
108	107	Matthew Smith	South Africa	30:04.4	+9:28.2
109	110	Rakan Alireza	Saudi Arabia	31:04.0	+10:27.8
110	112	Attila Mihaly Kertesz	Israel	31:24.4	+10:48.2
111	106	Klaus Jungbluth	Ecuador	31:34.5	+10:58.3
	99	Modestas Vaičiulis	Lithuania	Did not finish	
	78	Bernat Sellés	Spain	Disqualified	
