= Cross-country skiing at the 2026 Winter Olympics – Men's 50 kilometre classical =

Men's 50 kilometre classical at the XXV Olympic Winter Games
- Cross-country skiing
- Venue: Cross country and biathlon center Fabio Canal, Tesero
- Date: 21 February 2026
- Competitors: 62 from 35 nations
- Winning time: 2:06:44.8

Medalists
1st place, gold medalist(s)		Johannes Høsflot Klæbo	Norway
2nd place, silver medalist(s)		Martin Løwstrøm Nyenget	Norway
3rd place, bronze medalist(s)		Emil Iversen	Norway

The men's 50 kilometre classical competition in cross-country skiing at the 2026 Winter Olympics was held on 21 February, at the Cross country and biathlon center Fabio Canal in Tesero. The Norwegians swept the podium. Johannes Høsflot Klæbo won the event, thereby becoming the first cross-country skier who won all six events at the same Olympics. It was his 11th Olympic gold medal and 13th overall. Martin Løwstrøm Nyenget won silver and Emil Iversen bronze. For Iversen, this was the first individual Olympic medal.

== Background ==
The 2022 champion, Alexander Bolshunov, and the silver medalist, Ivan Yakimushkin, were not allowed to participate because skiers from Russia could only participate as individual neutral athletes, and they did not obtain this status. The 2022 bronze medalist, Simen Hegstad Krüger, was not selected for the Olympics. Johannes Høsflot Klæbo was leading both overall and distance standings of the FIS Cross-Country World Cup before the Olympics. He was also the 2025 world champion in the 50 km freestyle. This was the last men's event in the cross-country skiing at the 2026 Olympics.

Klæbo won five previous events, which, with total 10 gold medals, made him the most decorated Winter Olympian of all time. He was on his quest to become the first person to win six gold medals at the same Winter Olympics.

== Summary ==
Until approximately 20 km the leading group consisted of Klæbo, Løwstrøm Nyenget, Iversen, Savelii Korostelev, and Victor Lovera. Then Lovera dropped off, and later Korostelev dropped off. For the second half of the distance, the three Norwegians were skiing together. A few kilometers before the finish, Iversen dropped off, getting the bronze, and a few hundred meters before the finish line Klæbo outskied Løwstrøm Nyenget for the gold.

== Results ==
The race was started at 11:00.

Rank	Bib	Name	Country	Time	Deficit
1st place, gold medalist(s)	1	Johannes Høsflot Klæbo	Norway	2:06:44.8	
2nd place, silver medalist(s)	3	Martin Løwstrøm Nyenget	Norway	2:06:53.7	+8.9
3rd place, bronze medalist(s)	4	Emil Iversen	Norway	2:07:15.5	+30.7
4	23	Théo Schely	France	2:09:44.5	+2:59.7
5	12	Savelii Korostelev	Individual Neutral Athletes	2:10:23.1	+3:38.3
6	9	Andrew Musgrave	Great Britain	2:10:43.5	+3:58.7
7	14	Arsi Ruuskanen	Finland	2:10:51.0	+4:06.2
8	17	Victor Lovera	France	2:11:29.9	+4:45.1
9	13	Gustaf Berglund	Sweden	2:11:58.5	+5:13.7
10	15	Florian Notz	Germany	2:13:14.0	+6:29.2
11	19	Antoine Cyr	Canada	2:13:37.8	+6:53.0
12	29	Dominik Bury	Poland	2:13:39.7	+6:54.9
13	5	Gus Schumacher	United States	2:14:11.6	+7:26.8
14	26	Beda Klee	Switzerland	2:14:45.1	+8:00.3
15	22	Alvar Johannes Alev	Estonia	2:14:47.3	+8:02.5
16	25	Joe Davies	Great Britain	2:14:52.7	+8:07.9
17	31	Thomas Stephen	Canada	2:15:07.9	+8:23.1
18	24	Simone Daprà	Italy	2:15:12.7	+8:27.9
19	36	Nicola Wigger	Switzerland	2:15:37.8	+8:53.0
20	16	Friedrich Moch	Germany	2:16:29.6	+9:44.8
21	34	Matyáš Bauer	Czech Republic	2:17:23.6	+10:38.8
22	11	Elia Barp	Italy	2:18:22.9	+11:38.1
23	32	Thomas Maloney Westgård	Ireland	2:18:56.5	+12:11.7
24	20	Calle Halfvarsson	Sweden	2:19:24.3	+12:39.5
25	30	Johan Häggström	Sweden	2:19:55.5	+13:10.7
26	28	Naoto Baba	Japan	2:20:02.0	+13:17.2
27	37	Lauri Vuorinen	Finland	2:20:30.1	+13:45.3
28	42	Mike Ophoff	Czech Republic	2:20:43.8	+13:59.0
29	33	Martin Himma	Estonia	2:21:13.2	+14:28.4
30	41	Vili Črv	Slovenia	2:21:55.5	+15:10.7
31	43	Raimo Vīgants	Latvia	2:22:20.2	+15:35.4
32	35	Ryo Hirose	Japan	2:22:41.2	+15:56.4
33	6	Mathis Desloges	France	2:22:53.6	+16:08.8
34	8	Hugo Lapalus	France	2:22:53.6	+16:08.8
35	39	Hunter Wonders	United States	2:23:34.3	+16:49.5
36	38	Jakob Moch	Germany	2:23:44.8	+17:00.0
37	40	Miha Šimenc	Slovenia	2:24:25.3	+17:40.5
38	48	Peter Hinds	Slovakia	2:25:05.5	+18:20.7
39	47	Franco Dal Farra	Argentina	2:25:30.2	+18:45.4
40	44	Oleksandr Lisohor	Ukraine	2:27:02.6	+20:17.8
41	49	Seve de Campo	Australia	2:29:22.8	+22:38.0
42	56	Daniel Peshkov	Bulgaria	2:33:00.0	+26:15.2
43	54	Dmytro Drahun	Ukraine	2:33:29.1	+26:44.3
44	58	Ádám Kónya	Hungary	LAP	
45	53	Li Minglin	China	LAP	
46	51	Amirgali Muratbekov	Kazakhstan	LAP	
47	45	Paul Pepene	Romania	LAP	
48	46	Dagur Benediktsson	Iceland	LAP	
49	52	Gabriel Cojocaru	Romania	LAP	
50	63	Timo Juhani Grönlund	Bolivia	LAP	
51	57	Niks Saulitis	Latvia	LAP	
52	59	Mark Chanloung	Thailand	LAP	
53	55	Fredrik Fodstad	Colombia	LAP	
54	65	Ádám Büki	Hungary	LAP	
55	60	Sebastián Endrestad	Chile	LAP	
56	64	Marko Skender	Croatia	LAP	
57	61	Tautvydas Strolia	Lithuania	LAP	
	2	Harald Østberg Amundsen	Norway	DNF	
	7	Iivo Niskanen	Finland	DNF	
	18	Michal Novák	Czech Republic	DNF	
	50	Nail Bashmakov	Kazakhstan	DNF	
	62	Stevenson Savart	Haiti	DNF	
	10	Federico Pellegrino	Italy	DNS	
	21	Ristomatti Hakola	Finland	DNS	
	27	Ben Ogden	United States	DNS	
