= Oleksandr Lisohor =

Ukrainian cross-country skier

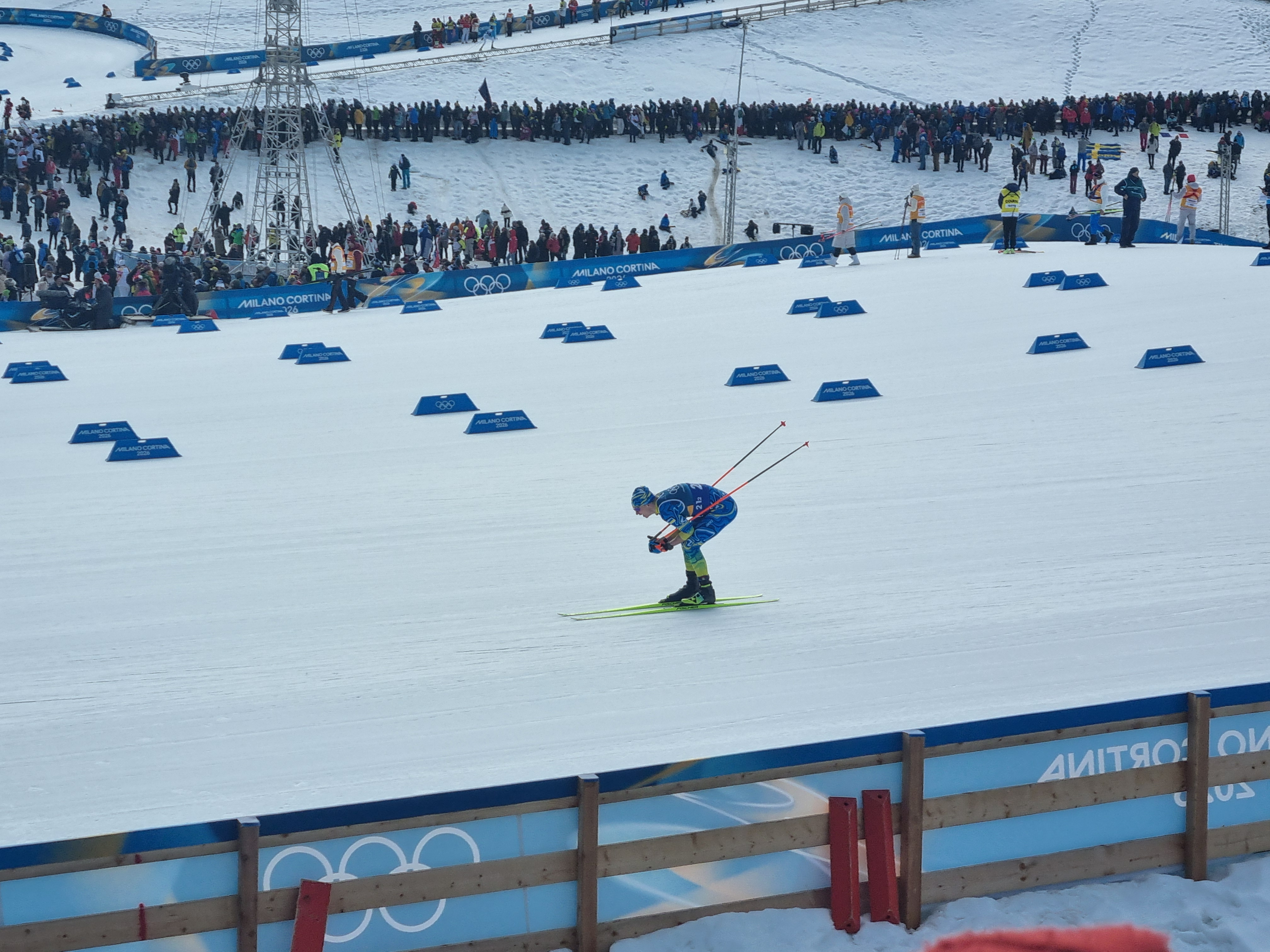
- Lisohor competing at the 2026 Olympics

Personal information
- Full name: Oleksandr Vladyslavovych Lisohor
- Born: 12 January 2004 (age 22)
- Height: 183 cm (6 ft 0 in)

Sport
- Sport: Skiing

World Cup career
- Seasons: 5 – (2022–)
- Indiv. podiums: 0
- Team podiums: 0
- Overall titles: 0
- Discipline titles: 0
- Updated on 2 March 2026

Oleksandr Vladyslavovych Lisohor (Ukrainian: Олександр Владиславович Лісогор; born 12 January 2004) is a cross-country skier from Ukraine. He represented Ukraine at the 2026 Winter Olympics.

== Cross-country skiing results ==
All results are sourced from the International Ski Federation (FIS).

=== Olympic Games ===
| Year | Age | 15 km individual | 30 km skiathlon | 50 km mass start | Sprint | 4 × 10 km relay | Team sprint |
|---|---|---|---|---|---|---|---|
| 2026 | 22 | 60 | 53 | 40 | 70 | — | 23 |

=== World Championships ===
| Year | Age | 15/10 km individual | 30/20 km skiathlon | 50 km mass start | Sprint | 4 × 10/7.5 km relay | Team sprint |
|---|---|---|---|---|---|---|---|
| 2023 | 19 | 74 | DNF | — | 76 | — | 24 |
| 2025 | 21 | 66 | 78 | 46 | 79 | 19 | 21 |

=== World Cup ===
==== Season standings ====
| Season | Age | Discipline standings | | | | Ski Tour standings | | | | |
| Season | Age | Overall | Distance | Sprint | U23 | Nordic Opening | Tour de Ski | Ski Tour 2020 | World Cup Final | Ski Tour Canada |
|---|---|---|---|---|---|---|---|---|---|---|
| 2022 | 18 | NC | NC | NC | —N/a | —N/a | — | —N/a | —N/a | —N/a |
| 2023 | 19 | NC | NC | NC | —N/a | —N/a | — | —N/a | —N/a | —N/a |
| 2024 | 20 | NC | NC | NC | —N/a | —N/a | — | —N/a | —N/a | —N/a |
| 2025 | 21 | 200 | 135 | NC | 43 | —N/a | — | —N/a | —N/a | —N/a |
