= Einar Hedegart =

Norwegian cross-country skier (born 2001)

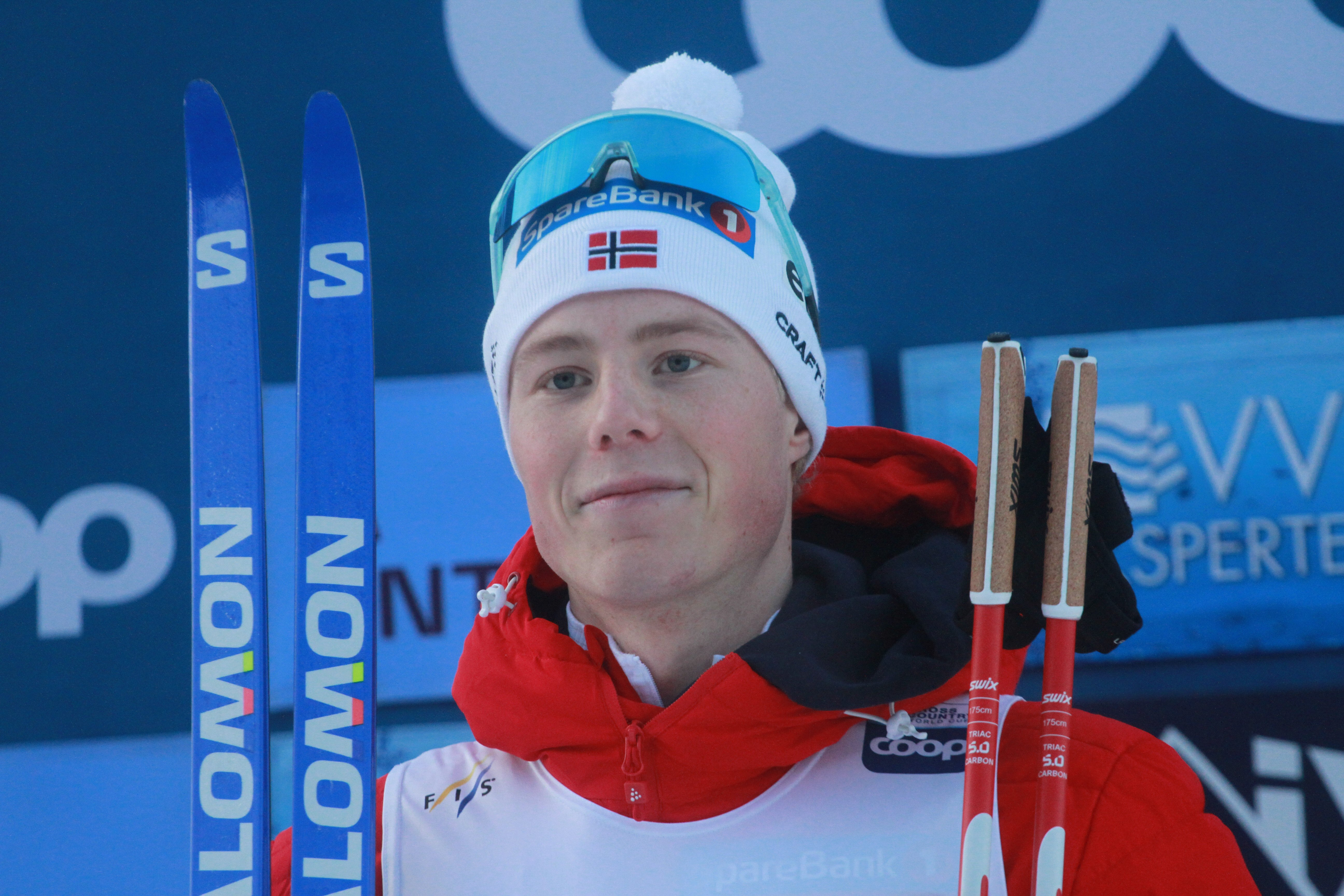
- Hedegart in 2025

Personal information
- Nationality: Norway
- Born: 8 November 2001 (age 24)

Sport
- Sport: Skiing

World Cup career
- Seasons: 2 – (2025–present)
- Indiv. starts: 7
- Indiv. podiums: 6
- Indiv. wins: 3
- Team starts: 1
- Team podiums: 1
- Team wins: 1
Medal record
Representing Norway
Men's cross-country skiing
Olympic Games
Gold medal – first place	2026 Milano Cortina	4 × 7.5 km relay
Gold medal – first place	2026 Milano Cortina	Team sprint
Bronze medal – third place	2026 Milano Cortina	10 km freestyle
Men's biathlon
Junior World Championships
Gold medal – first place	2023 Shchuchinsk	4 × 7.5 km relay
Silver medal – second place	2023 Shchuchinsk	15 km individual
Silver medal – second place	2023 Shchuchinsk	12.5 km pursuit
- Updated on 22 March 2026

Einar Hedegart (born 8 November 2001) is a Norwegian biathlete and cross-country skier. He represented Norway at the 2026 Winter Olympics.

== Career ==
Hedegart began his career as a biathlete and competed at the Biathlon Junior World Championships 2023. He won a gold medal in the 4 × 7.5 km relay, and silver medals in the 15 km individual and 12.5 km pursuit events.

Hedegart made his FIS Cross-Country World Cup debut during the 2024–25 FIS Cross-Country World Cup and in his second career race on 16 March 2025, he earned his first career podium, finishing in second place. After the race he was encouraged by several people to focus only on cross-country skiing. He previously announced that he would make a decision after the Norwegian National Championships on whether he will focus on biathlon or cross-country skiing. At the Norwegian National Championships he won gold medal in the men's mass start. Following the race he announced he would focus on being a biathlete.

During the 2025–26 FIS Cross-Country World Cup he earned his first career World Cup victory on 7 December 2025, winning the 10 km freestyle race. A week later he earned his second career World Cup victory on 14 December 2025. On 23 January 2026, he won the team sprint, along with Harald Østberg Amundsen.

In November 2025, he announced he would end his biathlon career to devote himself entirely to cross-country skiing ahead of the 2026 Winter Olympics. In December 2025, he was selected to represent Norway at the Olympics. In his Olympic debut on 13 February 2026, he won a bronze medal in the 10 kilometre freestyle event with a time of 20:50.2. His teammate, Johannes Høsflot Klæbo, won gold, marking the first time Hedegart lost to Klæbo in this discipline, after defeating him twice during the World Cup.

== Cross-country skiing results ==
=== Olympic Games ===
- 3 medals – (2 gold, 1 bronze)

Year	Age	10 km individual	20 km skiathlon	50 km mass start	Sprint	4 × 7.5 km relay	Team sprint
2026	24	Bronze	—	—	—	Gold	Gold

=== World Cup ===
==== Season standings ====
Season	Age	Discipline standings				Ski Tour standings			
Season	Age	Overall	Distance	Sprint	U23	Nordic Opening	Tour de Ski	Ski Tour 2020	World Cup Final
2025	23	92	55	—	—N/a	—N/a	—	—N/a	—N/a
2026	24	27	14	—	—N/a	—N/a	—	—N/a	—N/a

==== Individual podiums ====
- 3 wins – (3 WC)
- 6 podiums – (6 WC)

No.	Season	Date	Location	Race	Level	Place
1	2024–25	16 March 2025	Oslo, Norway	10 km Individual F	World Cup	2nd
2	2025–26	30 November 2025	Ruka, Finland	20 km Mass Start F	World Cup	2nd
3	2025–26	7 December 2025	Trondheim, Norway	10 km Individual F	World Cup	1st
4	2025–26	14 December 2025	Davos, Switzerland	10 km Individual F	World Cup	1st
5	2025–26	14 March 2026	Oslo, Norway	50 km Mass Start F	World Cup	1st
6	2025–26	22 March 2026	(United States) Lake Placid, USA	20 km Mass Start F	World Cup	3rd

==== Team podiums ====
- 1 victories – (1 TS)
- 1 podium – (1 TS)

No.	Season	Date	Location	Race	Level	Place	Teammates
1	2025–26	23 January 2026	Goms, Switzerland	6 × 1.5 km Team Sprint F	World Cup	1st	Amundsen
