= Cross-country skiing at the 2026 Winter Olympics – Men's 4 × 7.5 kilometre relay =

Men's 4 × 7.5 kilometre relay at the XXV Olympic Winter Games
- Cross-country skiing
- Venue: Cross country and biathlon center Fabio Canal, Tesero
- Date: 15 February 2026
- Competitors: 40 from 10 nations
- Winning time: 1:04:24.5

Medalists
1st place, gold medalist(s)		Emil Iversen; Martin Løwstrøm Nyenget; Einar Hedegart; Johannes Høsflot Klæbo	Norway
2nd place, silver medalist(s)		Théo Schely; Hugo Lapalus; Mathis Desloges; Victor Lovera	France
3rd place, bronze medalist(s)		Davide Graz; Elia Barp; Martino Carollo; Federico Pellegrino	Italy

The men's 4 × 7.5 kilometre relay competition in cross-country skiing at the 2026 Winter Olympics was held on 15 February, at the Cross country and biathlon center Fabio Canal in Tesero. Norway, represented by Emil Iversen, Martin Løwstrøm Nyenget, Einar Hedegart, and Johannes Høsflot Klæbo, won the event. For Klæbo, this became the ninth Olympic gold medal, which was the record number for any Winter Olympic athlete in history. France finished second, and Italy third.

== Background ==
The 2022 champions were the Russian Olympic Committee team which were barred from the 2026 Olympics after the Russian invasion of Ukraine. Norway were the silver medalists and France the bronze medalists. Norway were the 2025 world champions in the relay, followed by Switzerland and Sweden.

== Results ==
The race was started at 12:00.

Rank	Bib	Country	Time	Deficit
1st place, gold medalist(s)	1	Norway; Emil Iversen; Martin Løwstrøm Nyenget; Einar Hedegart; Johannes Høsflot Klæbo	1:04:24.5; 16:15.1; 16:32.1; 15:24.7; 16:12.6	
2nd place, silver medalist(s)	4	France; Théo Schely; Hugo Lapalus; Mathis Desloges; Victor Lovera	1:04:46.7; 16:25.7; 16:36.2; 15:22.2; 16:22.6	+22.2
3rd place, bronze medalist(s)	6	Italy; Davide Graz; Elia Barp; Martino Carollo; Federico Pellegrino	1:05:12.4; 16:16.0; 16:45.4; 16:09.0; 16:02.0	+47.9
4	9	Finland; Lauri Vuorinen; Iivo Niskanen; Arsi Ruuskanen; Niko Anttola	1:05:21.6; 16:22.3; 16:35.1; 15:51.7; 16:32.5	+57.1
5	5	Canada; Xavier McKeever; Antoine Cyr; Rémi Drolet; Thomas Stephen	1:05:36.8; 16:17.1; 16:45.7; 16:13.6; 16:20.4	+1:12.3
6	7	United States; Ben Ogden; Gus Schumacher; John Steel Hagenbuch; Zak Ketterson	1:06:11.8; 16:15.7; 16:46.7; 16:29.4; 16:40.0	+1:47.3
7	10	Czech Republic; Jiří Tuž; Michal Novák; Matyáš Bauer; Mike Ophoff	1:06:23.6; 16:33.3; 16:57.3; 16:13.9; 16:39.1	+1:59.1
8	8	Germany; Janosch Brugger; Friedrich Moch; Florian Notz; Jan Stölben	1:06:37.1; 16:45.8; 17:27.1; 16:08.3; 16:15.9	+2:12.6
9	2	Switzerland; Valerio Grond; Nicola Wigger; Beda Klee; Noe Näff	1:07:09.5; 16:31.0; 16:59.9; 16:13.4; 17:25.2	+2:45.0
10	3	Sweden; Johan Häggström; Calle Halfvarsson; William Poromaa; Edvin Anger	1:07:53.3; 16:53.0; 17:33.6; 16:11.6; 17:15.1	+3:28.8
