= Colombia at the 2026 Winter Olympics =

- Flag of Colombia
- IOC code: COL
- NOC: Colombian Olympic Committee
- Website: www.olimpicocol.co (in Spanish)

in Milan and Cortina d'Ampezzo, Italy 6 February 2026 – 22 February 2026
- Competitors: 1 (1 man) in 1 sport
- Flag bearer (opening): Fredrik Fodstad
- Flag bearer (closing): Volunteer
- Medals: Gold 0 Silver 0 Bronze 0 Total 0

Winter Olympics appearances (overview)
- 2010; 2014; 2018; 2022; 2026

Colombia competed at the 2026 Winter Olympics in Milan and Cortina d'Ampezzo, Italy, from 6 to 22 February 2026. It was the country's fourth appearance at the Winter Olympics, since its debut at the 2010 Winter Olympics in Vancouver. The Colombian delegation consisted of a single athlete competing in a single sport. It did not win any medals at the Games.

== Background ==
The Colombian Olympic Committee (Comité Olímpico Colombiano) was formed in 1936 and recognized by the International Olympic Committee (IOC) in 1939. Colombia first competed in the Olympics at the 1932 Summer Olympics. However, it made its first Winter Olympics appearance only at the 2010 Winter Olympics in Vancouver. The 2026 Winter Olympics was the country's fourth appearance at the Winter Olympics.

The 2026 Winter Olympics was held in Milan and Cortina d'Ampezzo, Italy, between 6 and 22 February 2026. As Colombia's sole representative, cross-country skier Fredrik Fodstad was the country's flagbearer during the opening ceremony. As no Colombian athletes were present for the closing ceremony, a volunteer carried Colombia's flag. Colombia did not win a medal at the Games.

== Competitors ==
The Colombian team consisted of a single athlete.

Sport	Men	Women	Total
Cross-country skiing	1	0	1
Total	1	0	1

== Cross-country skiing ==
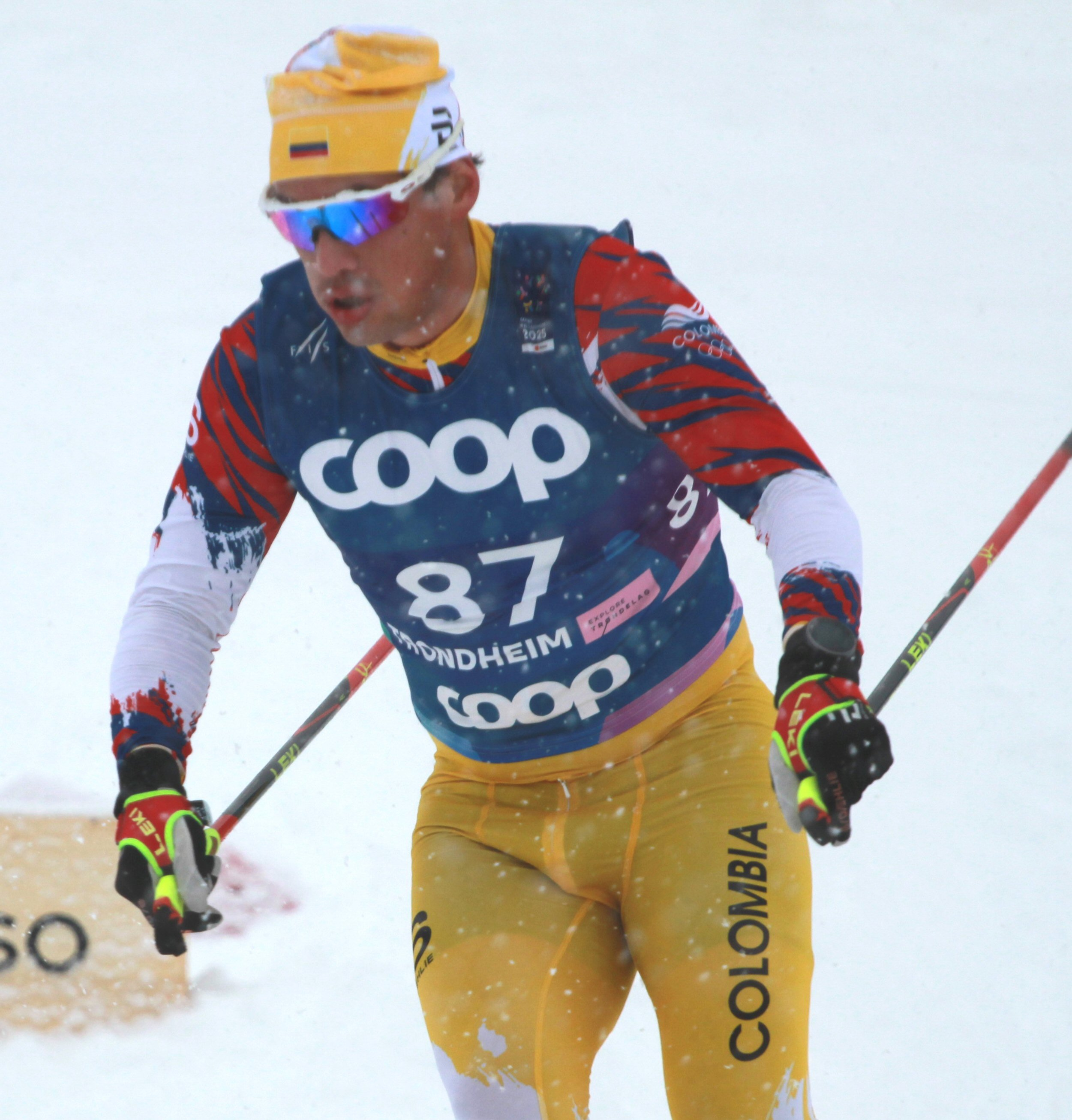
Fredrik Fodstad, Colombia's lone participant at the Games

As per the International Ski Federation (FIS), a maximum of 296 athletes were allowed to compete in cross-country skiing, including 148 men and 148 women. A maximum of 16 athletes per National Olympic Committee was allowed to compete with a maximum of eight per gender and not more than four athletes in any single event. An athlete who has less than 150 FIS Distance points on the ranking list published on 19 January 2026, was eligible for participation in the distance and/or sprint events. If an athlete has not met the 'A' standard, but had less than 350 FIS Distance points, the athlete was allowed be entered in the freestyle distance race, and an athlete who had less than 350 FIS Sprint points was allowed to be entered in the sprint race.

Colombia qualified one male cross-country skier, Fredrik Fodstad for the Games for both the distance and sprint. Fodstad was born in Bogotá, Colombia, and was adopted as an infant and raised in Eidsvoll, Norway. He started skiing at the age of four, and later moved to Lillehammer to attend high school, joining Lillehammer SK. He began representing Colombia in 2021. He appeared in the 2022–23 FIS Cross-Country World Cup and was placed 64th in the men's classic sprint race. He made his Olympic debut at the Games.

The cross-country skiing events were held at the 1.547 km (0.961 mi)-long course at the Lago di Tésero Cross Country Stadium in Trentino. In the sprint race, he finished 83rd out of the 94 participants in the qualification rounds and did not advance further. In the 10km freestyle event, he finished 101st out of the 113 participants with a time of over 27 minutes and 35 seconds. In the 50 km classical event, he was lapped and finished 53rd out of the 62 participants in the standings. In the skiathlon event, he was ranked 68th in the classical leg, and was lapped in the freestyle leg to finish 69th out of the 74 participants.

Distance

Athlete	Event	Classical		Freestyle		Final	
Athlete	Event	Time	Rank	Time	Rank	Time	Rank
Fredrik Fodstad	Men's 10km freestyle	—N/a		27:35.3	101	—N/a	
Fredrik Fodstad	Men's skiathlon	28:50.0	68	LAP			69
Fredrik Fodstad	Men's 50 km classical	LAP	53	—N/a			

Sprint

Athlete	Event	Qualification		Quarterfinal		Semifinal		Final	
Athlete	Event	Time	Rank	Time	Rank	Time	Rank	Time	Rank
Fredrik Fodstad	Men's sprint	3:41.28	83	Did not advance					
