= Vilma Ryytty =

Finnish cross-country skier (born 2001)

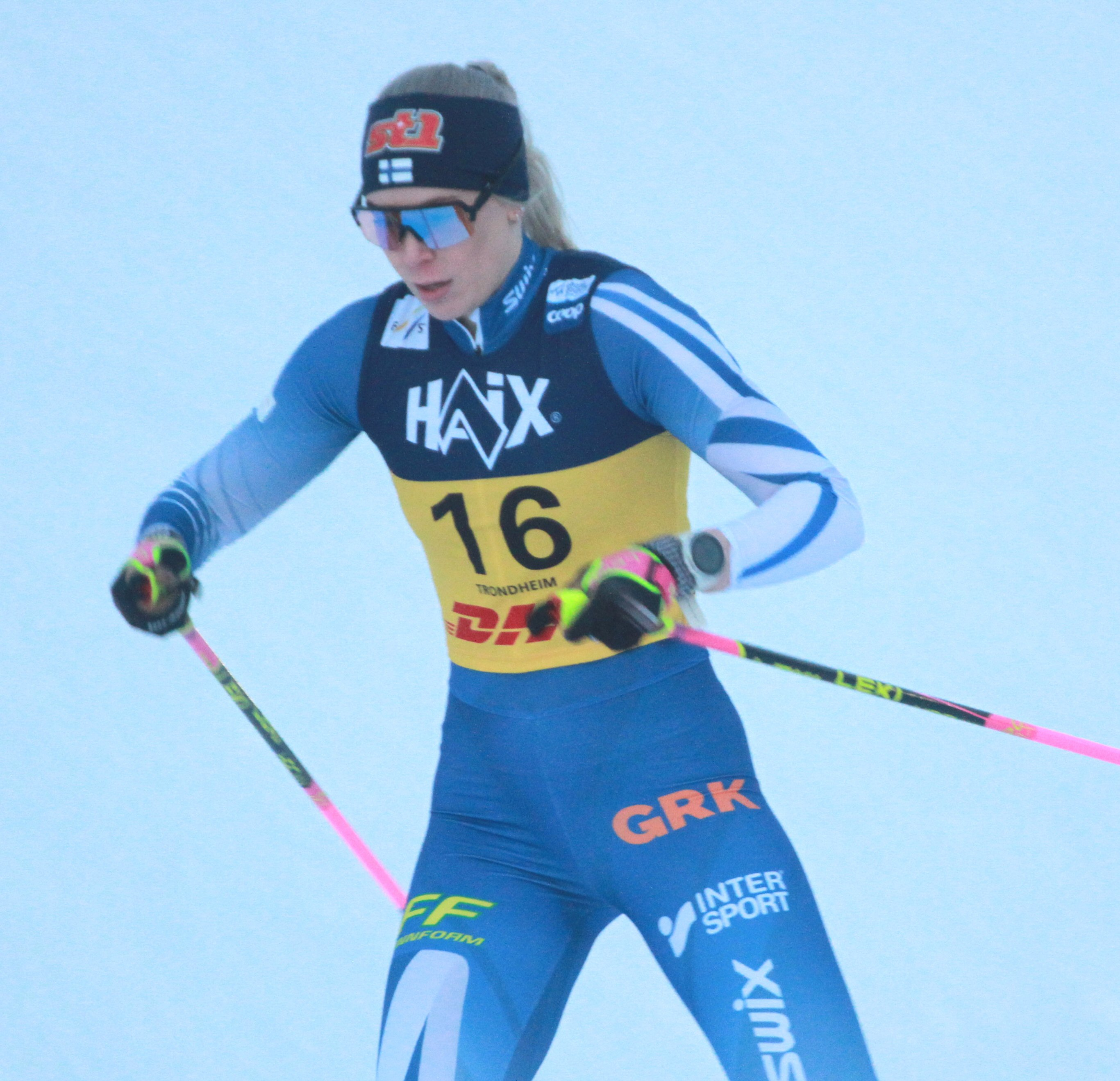
- Ryytty in 2025

Personal information
- Nationality: Finnish
- Born: 27 May 2001 (age 25) Iisalmi, Finland

Sport
- Sport: Cross-country skiing
Medal record
Women's cross-country skiing
Representing Finland
Olympic Games
Bronze medal – third place	2026 Milano Cortina	4 × 7.5 km relay

Vilma Ryytty (born 27 May 2001) is a Finnish cross-country skier. She competes in the FIS Cross-Country World Cup.

== Career ==
Ryytty competed in the World Cup for the first time in Oslo in March 2023. She finished 32nd in the 50 km freestyle mass start. She made it into the top 30 for the first time in Ruka on 26 November 2023, where she finished 28th in the 20 km freestyle mass start. She came close to the top ten with his 12th place in the 10 km freestyle race in Cogne in February 2025. She finished ninth in the 10 km freestyle race in Davos in December 2025.

Ryytty finished fifth in the traditional sprint at the 2021 Vuokatti Junior World Championships. In the under-23 category, she participated in three Junior World Championships, with her best finish being 11th in the 10 km in Whistler, Canada in 2023. At the 2025 Trondheim World Championships, Ryytty finished 18th in the 50 km freestyle mass start and 28th in the combined event. At the 2026 Winter Olympics, she finished 15th in the 20 km skiathlon event and 18th in the 10 km freestyle event then won a bronze medal in the 4 × 7.5 kilometre relay.

In January 2025, at the Finnish Cross-Country Championships in Imatra, Ryytty came second in the 10 km traditional cross-country skiing, with Anne Kyllönen winning the race. In the 20 km combined competition, Ryytty broke away from the others when changing skis and held first place until the finish.

== Personal life ==
Ryytty is engaged to skier and ski coach Roope Haapakangas.

== Skiathlon results ==
All results are sourced from the IOC.

=== Olympic Games ===
Year	Age	10 km individual	20 km skiathlon	50 km mass start	Sprint	4 × 7.5 km relay	Team sprint
2026	24	18	15	—	—	Bronze	—
