= Mathis Desloges =

French cross-country skier (born 2002)

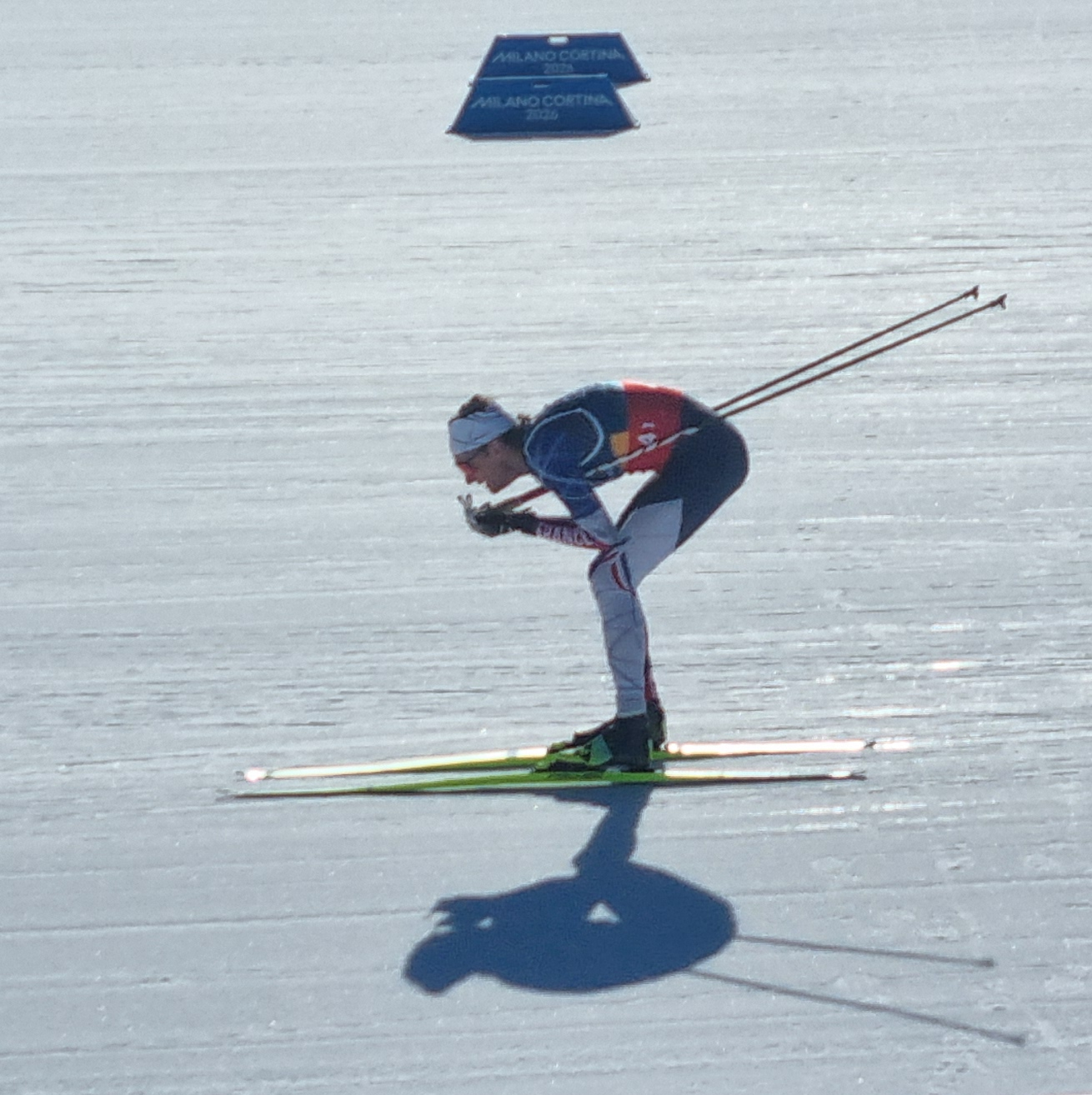
- Desloges at the 2026 Winter Olympics

Personal information
- Born: 1 May 2002 (age 24) Saint-Martin-d'Hères, France

Sport
- Sport: Cross-country skiing
- Club: Club de ski nordique Villard-de-Lans
Medal record
Men's cross-country skiing
Representing France
Olympic Games
Silver medal – second place	2026 Milano Cortina	10 km freestyle
Silver medal – second place	2026 Milano Cortina	20 km skiathlon
Silver medal – second place	2026 Milano Cortina	4 × 7.5 km relay

Mathis Desloges (French pronunciation: [matis delɔʒ]; born 1 May 2002) is a French cross-country skier. He represented France at the 2026 Winter Olympics in cross-country skiing and won silver medals in the 20 kilometre skiathlon, 10 kilometre freestyle, and 4 × 7.5 kilometre relay.

== Cross-country skiing results ==
All results are sourced from the International Ski Federation (FIS).

=== Olympic Games ===
- 3 medals – (3 silver)

Year	Age	10 km individual	20 km skiathlon	50 km mass start	Sprint	4 × 7.5 km relay	Team sprint
2026	23	Silver	Silver	—	—	Silver	12th
