= Germany at the 2026 Winter Olympics =

- Flag of Germany
- IOC code: GER
- NOC: German Olympic Sports Confederation
- Website: www.dosb.de (in German)

in Milan and Cortina d'Ampezzo, Italy 6−22 February
- Competitors: 185 (99 men and 86 women) in 15 sports
- Flag bearers (opening): Leon Draisaitl & Katharina Schmid
- Flag bearers (closing): Tobias Arlt & Tobias Wendl
- Medals Ranked 5th: Gold 8 Silver 10 Bronze 8 Total 26

Winter Olympics appearances (overview)
- 1928; 1932; 1936; 1948; 1952; 1956–1988; 1992; 1994; 1998; 2002; 2006; 2010; 2014; 2018; 2022; 2026

Other related appearances
- United Team of Germany (1956–1964); East Germany (1968–1988); West Germany (1968–1988)

Germany competed at the 2026 Winter Olympics in Milan and Cortina d'Ampezzo, Italy, which was held from 6 to 22 February 2026, and it will be the nation's 14th appearance as a unified country at the Olympic Winter Games. Except for 1924 and 1948 in the aftermath of the World Wars. From 1956 through 1964, Germans competed as part of the United Team of Germany (UTG); in 1968, the team was split into two teams West Germany and East Germany. One year after the fall of the Berlin Wall, West and East Germany re-united as one country with their reunification in 1990, and it has participated in every Winter Olympics since Albertville 1992.

The team consisted of 185 athletes, 99 men and 86 women, along with four reserve athletes. It was the largest German contingent ever sent to these Winter Games.

Meanwhile, luge pair Tobias Arlt and Tobias Wendl were the country's flagbearer during the closing ceremony.

Germany concluded the Games with a total of 26 medals, including 8 gold, 10 silver, and 8 bronze. While the country maintained a strong position in sliding sports, the total represented a slight decline compared to previous Games, with Germany dropping from second to fifth place in the final gold medal standings.

== Competitors ==
The following is the list of number of competitors participating at the Games per sport/discipline.

Sport	Men	Women	Total
Alpine skiing	5	4	9
Biathlon	5	6	11
Bobsleigh	12	6	18
Cross-country skiing	5	8	13
Curling	5	0	5
Figure skating	3	3	6
Freestyle skiing	4	7	11
Ice hockey	25	23	48
Luge	7	5	12
Nordic combined	3	—N/a	3
Skeleton	3	3	6
Ski jumping	4	4	8
Ski mountaineering	1	2	3
Snowboarding	10	9	19
Speed skating	7	6	13
Total	99	86	185

== Medalists ==
The following German competitors won medals at the games. In the discipline sections below, the medalists' names are bolded.

Medal	Name	Sport	Event	Date
Gold	Max Langenhan	Luge	Men's singles	8 February
Gold	Philipp Raimund	Ski jumping	Men's normal hill individual	9 February
Gold	Julia Taubitz	Luge	Women's singles	10 February
Gold	Tobias Arlt; Dajana Eitberger; Max Langenhan; Magdalena Matschina; Julia Taubitz; Tobias Wendl	Luge	Team relay	12 February
Gold	Johannes Lochner; Georg Fleischhauer	Bobsleigh	Two-man	17 February
Gold	Daniela Maier	Freestyle skiing	Women's ski cross	20 February
Gold	Laura Nolte; Deborah Levi	Bobsleigh	Two-woman	21 February
Gold	Johannes Lochner; Thorsten Margis; Jörn Wenzel; Georg Fleischhauer	Bobsleigh	Four-man	22 February
Silver	Emma Aicher	Alpine skiing	Women's downhill	8 February
Silver	Emma Aicher; Kira Weidle-Winkelmann	Alpine skiing	Women's team combined	10 February
Silver	Dajana Eitberger; Magdalena Matschina	Luge	Women's doubles	11 February
Silver	Axel Jungk	Skeleton	Men's	13 February
Silver	Susanne Kreher	Skeleton	Women's	14 February
Silver	Susanne Kreher; Axel Jungk	Skeleton	Mixed team	15 February
Silver	Laura Nolte	Bobsleigh	Women's monobob	16 February
Silver	Francesco Friedrich; Alexander Schüller	Bobsleigh	Two-man	17 February
Silver	Lisa Buckwitz; Neele Schuten	Bobsleigh	Two-woman	21 February
Silver	Francesco Friedrich; Matthias Sommer; Alexander Schüller; Felix Straub	Bobsleigh	Four-man	22 February
Bronze	Justus Strelow; Philipp Nawrath; Vanessa Voigt; Franziska Preuß	Biathlon	Mixed relay	8 February
Bronze	Tobias Arlt; Tobias Wendl	Luge	Men's doubles	11 February
Bronze	Christopher Grotheer	Skeleton	Men's	13 February
Bronze	Jacqueline Pfeifer	Skeleton	Women's	14 February
Bronze	Jacqueline Pfeifer; Christopher Grotheer	Skeleton	Mixed team	15 February
Bronze	Minerva Fabienne Hase; Nikita Volodin	Figure Skating	Pairs	16 February
Bronze	Adam Ammour; Alexander Schaller	Bobsleigh	Two-man	17 February
Bronze	Laura Gimmler; Coletta Rydzek	Cross-country skiing	Women's team sprint	18 February

Medals by date
**Day**	**Date**	1st place, gold medalist(s)	2nd place, silver medalist(s)	3rd place, bronze medalist(s)	Total
1	7 February	0	0	0	0
2	8 February	1	1	1	3
3	9 February	1	0	0	1
4	10 February	1	1	0	2
5	11 February	0	1	1	2
6	12 February	1	0	0	1
7	13 February	0	1	1	2
8	14 February	0	1	1	2
9	15 February	0	1	1	2
10	16 February	0	1	1	2
11	17 February	1	1	1	3
12	18 February	0	0	1	1
13	19 February	0	0	0	0
14	20 February	1	0	0	1
15	21 February	1	1	0	2
16	22 February	1	1	0	2
Total		8	10	8	26

Medals by sport
Sport	1st place, gold medalist(s)	2nd place, silver medalist(s)	3rd place, bronze medalist(s)	Total
Bobsleigh	3	4	1	**8**
Luge	3	1	1	**5**
Freestyle skiing	1	0	0	**1**
Ski jumping	1	0	0	**1**
Skeleton	0	3	3	**6**
Alpine skiing	0	2	0	**2**
Biathlon	0	0	1	**1**
Cross-country skiing	0	0	1	**1**
Figure Skating	0	0	1	**1**
Total	8	10	8	26

Medals by gender
Gender	1st place, gold medalist(s)	2nd place, silver medalist(s)	3rd place, bronze medalist(s)	Total
Male	4	3	3	**9**
Female	3	6	2	**10**
Mixed	1	1	3	**5**
Total	8	10	8	26

Multiple medalists
**Name**	**Sport**	1st place, gold medalist(s)	2nd place, silver medalist(s)	3rd place, bronze medalist(s)	Total
Georg Fleischhauer	Bobsleigh	2	0	0	2
Johannes Lochner	Bobsleigh	2	0	0	2
Max Langenhan	Luge	2	0	0	2
Julia Taubitz	Luge	2	0	0	2
Laura Nolte	Bobsleigh	1	1	0	2
Dajana Eitberger	Luge	1	1	0	2
Magdalena Matschina	Luge	1	1	0	2
Tobias Arlt	Luge	1	0	1	2
Tobias Wendl	Luge	1	0	1	2
Emma Aicher	Alpine Skiing	0	2	0	2
Francesco Friedrich	Bobsleigh	0	2	0	2
Alexander Schüller	Bobsleigh	0	2	0	2
Axel Jungk	Skeleton	0	2	0	2
Susanne Kreher	Skeleton	0	2	0	2
Christopher Grotheer	Skeleton	0	0	2	2
Jacqueline Pfeifer	Skeleton	0	0	2	2

== Alpine skiing ==
Germany qualified one female and one male alpine skier through the basic quota and 5 additional quota in women's and 3 in men's events. Germany gave back 2 female quotas and nominated 4 female skiers on 20 January 2026, the men's team will be announced after the reallocation period during which Germany received 2 additional men's quotas. The male skiers were announced on January 21, 2026.

Men

Athlete	Event	Run 1		Run 2		Total	
Athlete	Event	Time	Rank	Time	Rank	Time	Rank
Anton Grammel	Super-G	—N/a				1:29.39	29
Anton Grammel	Giant slalom	1:16.56	15	1:11.16	12	2:27.72	15
Fabian Gratz	Giant slalom	1:16.20	10	DNF			
Fabian Gratz	Slalom	DNF					
Simon Jocher	Downhill	—N/a				1:54.01	21
Simon Jocher	Super-G	—N/a				1:26.87	17
Alexander Schmid	Giant slalom	1:16.84	20	1:10.64	3	2:27.48	13
Linus Straßer	Slalom	58.49	12	57.29	7	1:55.78	9
Simon Jocher; Linus Straßer	Team combined	1:53.13	11	52.60	11	2:45.73	10

Women

Athlete	Event	Run 1		Run 2		Total	
Athlete	Event	Time	Rank	Time	Rank	Time	Rank
Emma Aicher	Downhill	—N/a				1:36.14	2nd place, silver medalist(s)
Emma Aicher	Super-G	—N/a				DNF	
Emma Aicher	Giant slalom	1:04.48	17	1:10.65	22	2:15.13	19
Emma Aicher	Slalom	48.45	8	53.14	20	1:41.59	9
Lena Dürr	Giant slalom	1:03.57	2	1:10.74	24	2:14.31	9
Lena Dürr	Slalom	47.95	2	DNF			
Kira Weidle-Winkelmann	Downhill	—N/a				1:37.26	9
Kira Weidle-Winkelmann	Super-G	—N/a				DNF	
Kira Weidle-Winkelmann; Emma Aicher	Team combined	1:37.33	6	44.38	1	2:21.71	2nd place, silver medalist(s)

== Biathlon ==
Germany qualified six female and five male biathletes through the 2024–25 Biathlon World Cup score. On 20 January 2026, DOSB nominated the following athletes:

Men

Athlete	Event	Time	Misses	Rank
Lucas Fratzscher	Individual	56:38.7	2 (0+0+1+1)	23
Philipp Horn	Individual	57:50.8	6 (2+1+1+2)	40
Philipp Nawrath	Individual	53:03.0	1 (1+0+0+0)	5
David Zobel	Individual	56:31.8	2 (0+2+0+0)	21
Philipp Horn	Sprint	24:02.3	1 (0+1)	10
Philipp Nawrath	Sprint	24:46.0	3 (2+1)	26
Justus Strelow	Sprint	24:39.5	1 (0+1)	23
David Zobel	Sprint	24:34.9	0 (0+0)	19
Philipp Horn	Pursuit	33:22.7	3 (0+0+2+1)	11
Philipp Nawrath	Pursuit	34:22.9	6 (2+1+1+2)	25
Justus Strelow	Pursuit	34:47.4	4 (0+0+1+3)	30
David Zobel	Pursuit	35:21.8	5 (2+1+1+1)	34
Philipp Horn	Mass start	39:52.6	1 (0+0+0+1)	4
Philipp Nawrath	Mass start	41:22.4	5 (0+1+1+3)	7
David Zobel	Mass start	43:49.5	7 (0+2+4+1)	23
Justus Strelow; David Zobel; Philipp Nawrath; Philipp Horn	Team relay	1:21:43.5	12 (0+12)	4

Women

Athlete	Event	Time	Misses	Rank
Selina Grotian	Individual	46:39.8	4 (0+0+3+1)	55
Janina Hettich-Walz	Individual	43:18.9	2 (1+1+0+0)	8
Franziska Preuß	Individual	43:35.5	2 (0+0+0+2)	10
Vanessa Voigt	Individual	42:33.0	0 (0+0+0+0)	4
Selina Grotian	Sprint	23:03.4	3 (2+1)	52
Franziska Preuß	Sprint	21:40.9	1 (0+1)	7
Julia Tannheimer	Sprint	22:13.1	2 (2+0)	20
Vanessa Voigt	Sprint	21:54.8	0 (0+0)	12
Selina Grotian	Pursuit	34:06.4	4 (0+1+1+2)	41
Franziska Preuß	Pursuit	31:19.8	2 (0+0+0+2)	6
Julia Tannheimer	Pursuit	33:35.4	5 (0+2+2+1)	34
Vanessa Voigt	Pursuit	32:31.5	3 (1+1+0+1)	19
Janina Hettich-Walz	Mass start	38:59.7	4 (0+0+2+2)	17
Franziska Preuß	Mass start	40:50.5	7 (1+1+4+1)	28
Vanessa Voigt	Mass start	37:54.3	1 (0+0+0+1)	7
Julia Tannheimer; Franziska Preuß; Janina Hettich-Walz; Vanessa Voigt	Team relay	1:11:51.8	10 (1+9)	4

Mixed

Athlete	Event	Time	Misses	Rank
Justus Strelow; Philipp Nawrath; Vanessa Voigt; Franziska Preuß	Relay	1:05:20.8	4 (1+3)	3rd place, bronze medalist(s)

== Bobsleigh ==
Germany qualified 3 sleds in two-man, four-man, women's monobob and two-woman.

Men

Athlete	Event	Run 1		Run 2		Run 3		Run 4		Total	
Athlete	Event	Time	Rank	Time	Rank	Time	Rank	Time	Rank	Time	Rank
Adam Ammour*; Alexander Schaller	Two-man	55.12	2	56.02	11	55.03	3	55.35	4	3:41.52	3rd place, bronze medalist(s)
Francesco Friedrich*; Alexander Schüller	Two-man	55.16	3	55.54	2	55.01	2	55.33	2	3:41.04	2nd place, silver medalist(s)
Johannes Lochner*; Georg Fleischhauer	Two-man	54.68	1	55.22	1	54.89	1	54.91	1	3:39.70	1st place, gold medalist(s)
Adam Ammour*; Issam Ammour; Alexander Schaller; Joshua Tasche	Four-man	54.51	5	54.69	1	54.58	5	54.90	4	3:38.68	4
Francesco Friedrich*; Alexander Schüller; Matthias Sommer; Felix Straub	Four-man	54.30	2	54.74	3	54.30	2	54.80	3	3:38.14	2nd place, silver medalist(s)
Johannes Lochner*; Georg Fleischhauer; Thorsten Margis; Jörn Wenzel	Four-man	53.91	1	54.70	2	54.25	1	54.71	1	3:37.57	1st place, gold medalist(s)

Women

Athlete	Event	Run 1		Run 2		Run 3		Run 4		Total	
Athlete	Event	Time	Rank	Time	Rank	Time	Rank	Time	Rank	Time	Rank
Lisa Buckwitz	Monobob	1:00.06	7	59.98	6	59.11	3	59.67	7	3:58.82	4
Kim Kalicki	Monobob	1:00.14	10	1:00.98	23	1:00.62	21	59.59	4	4:01.33	15
Laura Nolte	Monobob	59.44	1	59.68	2	59.15	4	59.70	9	3:57.97	2nd place, silver medalist(s)
Lisa Buckwitz*; Neele Schuten	Two-woman	57.05	3	57.06	2	57.43	2	57.45	2	3:48.99	2nd place, silver medalist(s)
Kim Kalicki*; Talea Prepens	Two-woman	57.13	4	57.23	3	57.46	3	57.54	4	3:49.36	4
Laura Nolte*; Deborah Levi	Two-woman	56.97	2	56.96	1	57.26	1	57.27	1	3:48.46	1st place, gold medalist(s)

== Cross-country skiing ==
Germany qualified one female and one male cross-country skier through the basic quota. Following the completion of the 2024–25 FIS Cross-Country World Cup, Germany qualified further a seven female and four male athletes. In January 2026, DOSB nominated 8 women and 5 men.

Distance

Men

Athlete	Event	Classical		Freestyle		Final		
Athlete	Event	Time	Rank	Time	Rank	Time	Deficit	Rank
Janosch Brugger	10 km freestyle	—N/a				22:46.6	+2:10.4	44
Friedrich Moch	10 km freestyle	—N/a				22:25.0	+1:48.8	37
Florian Notz	10 km freestyle	—N/a				21:53.0	+1:16.8	22
Friedrich Moch	20 km skiathlon	24:42.1	23	23:54.2	31	48:36.3	+2:25.3	26
Jakob Moch	20 km skiathlon	25:53.5	41	23:15.4	18	49:08.9	+2:57.9	33
Florian Notz	20 km skiathlon	25:00.2	29	23:37.5	26	48:37.7	+2:26.7	28
Friedrich Moch	50 kilometre classical	—N/a				2:16:29.6	+9:22.5	20
Jakob Moch	50 kilometre classical	—N/a				2:24:07.1	+17:00.0	36
Florian Notz	50 kilometre classical	—N/a				2:13:14.0	+6:06.9	10
Janosch Brugger; Friedrich Moch; Florian Notz; Jan Stölben	4 × 7.5 km relay	—N/a				1:06:37.1	+2:12.6	8

Women

Athlete	Event	Classical		Freestyle		Final		
Athlete	Event	Time	Rank	Time	Rank	Time	Deficit	Rank
Pia Fink	10 km freestyle	—N/a				24:44.2	+1:55.0	19
Theresa Fürstenberg	10 km freestyle	—N/a				26:55.1	+4:05.9	68
Helen Hoffmann	10 km freestyle	—N/a				25:07.4	+2:18.2	28
Sofie Krehl	10 km freestyle	—N/a				25:51.1	+3:01.9	42
Pia Fink	20 km skiathlon	29:19.8	18	27:30.3	9	56:50.1	+3:04.9	12
Katharina Hennig Dotzler	20 km skiathlon	29:08.5	11	29:37.1	39	58:45.6	+5:00.4	30
Helen Hoffmann	20 km skiathlon	29:40.8	24	28:03.8	18	57:44.6	+3:59.4	18
Katherine Sauerbrey	20 km skiathlon	30:39.3	40	28:47.6	31	59:26.9	+5:41.7	33
Katharina Hennig Dotzler	50 kilometre classical	—N/a				2:25:16.4	+8:48.2	9
Katherine Sauerbrey	50 kilometre classical	—N/a				DNS		
Laura Gimmler; Katharina Hennig Dotzler; Helen Hoffmann; Pia Fink	4 × 7.5 km relay	—N/a				1:17:20.8	+1:36.0	4

Sprint

Athlete	Event	Qualification		Quarterfinal		Semifinal		Final	
Athlete	Event	Time	Rank	Time	Rank	Time	Rank	Time	Rank
Janosch Brugger	Men's sprint	3:20.45	36	Did not advance					
Jan Stölben	Men's sprint	3:15.76	11 Q	3:36.07	5	Did not advance			
Laura Gimmler	Women's sprint	3:45.81	17 Q	3:55.58	2 Q	4:15.48	3	Did not advance	
Sofie Krehl	Women's sprint	3:46.81	21 Q	4:04.40	6	Did not advance			
Coletta Rydzek	Women's sprint	3:47.80	24 Q	3:57.75	1 Q	4:17.67	4	Did not advance	
Katherine Sauerbrey	Women's sprint	3:52.42	39	Did not advance					
Jakob Moch; Jan Stölben	Men's team sprint	5:54.42	10 Q	—N/a				18:41.3	9
Laura Gimmler; Coletta Rydzek	Women's team sprint	6:49.02	6 Q	—N/a				20:35.86	3rd place, bronze medalist(s)

== Curling ==
Summary

Team	Event	Group stage										Semifinal	Final / BM	
Team	Event	Opposition Score	Opposition Score	Opposition Score	Opposition Score	Opposition Score	Opposition Score	Opposition Score	Opposition Score	Opposition Score	Rank	Opposition Score	Opposition Score	Rank
Marc Muskatewitz; Benjamin Kapp; Felix Messenzehl; Johannes Scheuerl; Mario Trevisiol	Men's tournament	CAN; L 6–7	NOR; W 5–4	ITA; W 6–5	USA; L 6–8	GBR; L 4–9	SWE; W 7–3	CZE; L 7–9	SUI; L 4–8	CHN; W 6–4	7	Did not advance		

=== Men's tournament ===
Germany qualified a men's team by earning enough points in the last two World Curling Championships. Team Marc Muskatewitz qualified as German representatives by representing the country at both the 2024 and 2025 World Championships.

Final Round Robin Standings
Team	Skip	Pld	W	L	W–L	PF	PA	EW	EL	BE	SE	S%	DSC	Qualification
Switzerland	Yannick Schwaller	9	9	0	–	75	40	42	30	3	8	88.7%	9.506	Playoffs
Canada	Brad Jacobs	9	7	2	–	63	45	40	28	8	13	86.5%	28.844	Playoffs
Norway	Magnus Ramsfjell	9	5	4	1–0	60	61	37	38	6	7	80.8%	26.938	Playoffs
Great Britain	Bruce Mouat	9	5	4	0–1	63	48	39	33	2	10	86.4%	16.613	Playoffs
United States	Daniel Casper	9	4	5	1–1	52	65	34	37	5	3	81.7%	17.663	
Italy	Joël Retornaz	9	4	5	1–1	58	67	33	39	6	7	83.0%	17.869	
Germany	Marc Muskatewitz	9	4	5	1–1	51	57	36	37	8	7	84.4%	24.850	
Czech Republic	Lukáš Klíma	9	3	6	–	54	63	35	41	3	5	79.8%	29.013	
Sweden	Niklas Edin	9	2	7	1–0	44	63	31	39	6	3	82.5%	26.000	
China	Xu Xiaoming	9	2	7	0–1	52	63	35	40	3	5	81.4%	34.875	

Source: Official website

Round robin
Germany has a bye in draws 3, 7 and 11.

Draw 1
Wednesday, 11 February, 19:05

Sheet B	1	2	3	4	5	6	7	8	9	10	11	Final
Canada (Jacobs)	0	0	0	2	2	0	0	0	2	0	1	7
Germany (Muskatewitz) 🔨	0	0	2	0	0	2	0	0	0	2	0	6

Draw 2
Thursday, 12 February, 14:05

Sheet A	1	2	3	4	5	6	7	8	9	10	Final
Norway (Ramsfjell)	0	1	0	0	1	0	0	1	0	1	4
Germany (Muskatewitz) 🔨	0	0	3	0	0	1	0	0	1	0	5

Draw 4
Friday, 13 February, 19:05

Sheet C	1	2	3	4	5	6	7	8	9	10	11	Final
Germany (Muskatewitz) 🔨	0	0	0	1	0	1	0	3	0	0	1	6
Italy (Retornaz)	0	0	1	0	1	0	2	0	0	1	0	5

Draw 5
Saturday, 14 February, 14:05

Sheet D	1	2	3	4	5	6	7	8	9	10	Final
Germany (Muskatewitz)	0	1	1	0	1	1	0	2	0	X	6
United States (Casper) 🔨	4	0	0	2	0	0	1	0	1	X	8

Draw 6
Sunday, 15 February, 9:05

Sheet B	1	2	3	4	5	6	7	8	9	10	Final
Germany (Muskatewitz)	0	0	2	0	0	0	0	2	0	X	4
Great Britain (Mouat) 🔨	2	0	0	2	1	0	2	0	2	X	9

Draw 8
Monday, 16 February, 14:05

Sheet C	1	2	3	4	5	6	7	8	9	10	Final
Sweden (Edin) 🔨	0	1	0	1	0	0	1	0	0	0	3
Germany (Muskatewitz)	0	0	2	0	1	1	0	1	1	1	7

Draw 9
Tuesday, 17 February, 9:05

Sheet D	1	2	3	4	5	6	7	8	9	10	Final
Czech Republic (Klíma)	0	1	0	1	0	0	3	1	0	3	9
Germany (Muskatewitz) 🔨	2	0	1	0	1	1	0	0	2	0	7

Draw 10
Thursday, 17 February, 19:05

Sheet A	1	2	3	4	5	6	7	8	9	10	Final
Germany (Muskatewitz)	0	0	1	0	1	0	0	2	X	X	4
Switzerland (Schwaller) 🔨	2	0	0	2	0	3	1	0	X	X	8

Draw 12
Thursday, 19 February, 9:05

Sheet C	1	2	3	4	5	6	7	8	9	10	Final
China (Xu) 🔨	0	1	0	0	1	0	1	0	1	0	4
Germany (Muskatewitz)	1	0	2	0	0	1	0	1	0	1	6

== Figure skating ==
In the 2025 World Figure Skating Championships in Boston, the United States, Germany secured two quota in pair skating, and one quota in each of the ice dance.

Athlete	Event	SP/SD		FP/FD		Total	
Athlete	Event	Points	Rank	Points	Rank	Points	Rank
Minerva Fabienne Hase; Nikita Volodin	Pairs	80.01	1 Q	139.08	4	219.09	3rd place, bronze medalist(s)
Annika Hocke; Robert Kunkel	Pairs	67.52	11 Q	126.59	8	194.11	10
Jennifer Janse van Rensburg; Benjamin Steffan	Ice dance	63.37	23	Did not advance			

== Freestyle skiing ==
DOSB announced the 4 men and 7 women competing on 20 January 2026

Aerials

Athlete	Event	Qualification				Final			
Athlete	Event	Jump 1		Jump 2		Jump 1		Jump 2	
Athlete	Event	Points	Rank	Points	Rank	Points	Rank	Points	Rank
Emma Weiß	Women's aerials	81.90	11	~~75.14~~	7 Q	75.28	12	Did not advance	

Park & Pipe

Athlete	Event	Qualification					Final				
Athlete	Event	Run 1	Run 2	Run 3	Best	Rank	Run 1	Run 2	Run 3	Best	Rank
Sabrina Cakmakli	Women's halfpipe	71.50	DNI	—N/a	71.50	16	Did not advance				
Muriel Mohr	Women's big air	73.50	~~20.25~~	65.00	138.50	15	Did not advance				

Ski cross
Men

Athlete	Event	Seeding		1/8 final	Quarterfinal	Semifinal	Final	
Athlete	Event	Time	Rank	Position	Position	Position	Position	Rank
Florian Fischer	Men's	1:07.89	14	2 Q	3	Did not advance		
Tim Hronek	Men's	1:08.68	26	1 Q	2 Q	4 SF	2	6
Cornel Renn	Men's	1:08.14	20	2 Q	3	Did not advance		
Florian Wilmsmann	Men's	1:07.27	4	1 Q	1 Q	4 SF	3	7

Women

Athlete	Event	Seeding		1/8 final	Quarterfinal	Semifinal	Final	
Athlete	Event	Time	Rank	Position	Position	Position	Position	Rank
Leonie Bachl-Staudinger	Women's	1:14.36	19	3	Did not advance			
Luisa Klapprott	Women's	1:14.07	16	3	Did not advance			
Daniela Maier	Women's	1:11.12	1	1 Q	1 Q	1 BF	1	1st place, gold medalist(s)
Veronika Redder	Women's	1:14.00	15	3	Did not advance			

== Ice hockey ==
Summary

Key:

- OT – Overtime
- GWS – Match decided by penalty-shootout

Team	Event	Group stage					Qualification playoff	Quarterfinal	Semifinal	Final / BM	
Team	Event	Opposition Score	Opposition Score	Opposition Score	Opposition Score	Rank	Opposition Score	Opposition Score	Opposition Score	Opposition Score	Rank
Germany men's	Men's tournament	Denmark; W 3–1	Latvia; L 3–4	United States; L 1–5	—N/a	2 Q	France; W 5–1	Slovakia; L 2–6	Did not advance		6
Germany women's	Women's tournament	Sweden; L 1–4	Japan; W 5–2	France; W 2–1 OT	Italy; W 2–1	2 Q	—N/a	Canada; L 1–5	Did not advance		7

=== Men's tournament ===
Germany men's national ice hockey team qualified a team of 25 players by finishing 5th in the 2023 IIHF World Ranking.

Roster

The first six players of Germany's roster were announced on 16 June 2025. The remainder of the roster was named on 7 January 2026. On 9 February, Leon Draisaitl was named Germany's captain, with Moritz Seider and Tim Stützle serving as alternate captains.

Head coach: Harold Kreis

No.	Pos.	Name	Height	Weight	Birthdate	Team
6	D	Kai Wissmann	1.93 m (6 ft 4 in)	94 kg (207 lb)	22 October 1996 (aged 29)	(Germany) Eisbären Berlin
8	F	Tobias Rieder	1.80 m (5 ft 11 in)	86 kg (190 lb)	10 January 1993 (aged 33)	(Germany) EHC Red Bull München
9	D	Leon Gawanke	1.85 m (6 ft 1 in)	90 kg (198 lb)	31 May 1999 (aged 26)	(Germany) Adler Mannheim
11	D	Korbinian Geibel	1.83 m (6 ft 0 in)	91 kg (201 lb)	8 July 2002 (aged 23)	(Germany) Eisbären Berlin
18	F	Tim Stützle – A	1.83 m (6 ft 0 in)	87 kg (192 lb)	15 January 2002 (aged 24)	(Canada) Ottawa Senators
19	F	Wojciech Stachowiak	1.85 m (6 ft 1 in)	85 kg (187 lb)	3 July 1999 (aged 26)	(United States) Syracuse Crunch
29	F	Leon Draisaitl – C	1.88 m (6 ft 2 in)	96 kg (212 lb)	27 October 1995 (aged 30)	(Canada) Edmonton Oilers
30	G	Philipp Grubauer	1.85 m (6 ft 1 in)	88 kg (194 lb)	25 November 1991 (aged 34)	(United States) Seattle Kraken
35	G	Mathias Niederberger	1.80 m (5 ft 11 in)	79 kg (174 lb)	3 January 1993 (aged 33)	(Germany) EHC Red Bull München
37	G	Maximilian Franzreb	1.83 m (6 ft 0 in)	90 kg (198 lb)	18 August 1996 (aged 29)	(Germany) Adler Mannheim
38	D	Fabio Wagner	1.85 m (6 ft 1 in)	83 kg (183 lb)	17 September 1995 (aged 30)	(Germany) EHC Red Bull München
40	F	Alexander Ehl	1.75 m (5 ft 9 in)	80 kg (176 lb)	8 November 1999 (aged 26)	(Germany) Adler Mannheim
41	D	Jonas Müller	1.83 m (6 ft 0 in)	92 kg (203 lb)	19 October 1995 (aged 30)	(Germany) Eisbären Berlin
44	F	Josh Samanski	1.91 m (6 ft 3 in)	91 kg (201 lb)	22 March 2002 (aged 23)	(United States) Bakersfield Condors
49	D	Lukas Kälble	1.85 m (6 ft 1 in)	93 kg (205 lb)	13 October 1997 (aged 28)	(Germany) Adler Mannheim
53	D	Moritz Seider – A	1.93 m (6 ft 4 in)	90 kg (198 lb)	6 April 2001 (aged 24)	(United States) Detroit Red Wings
62	F	Parker Tuomie	1.78 m (5 ft 10 in)	84 kg (185 lb)	31 October 1995 (aged 30)	(Germany) Kölner Haie
65	F	Marc Michaelis	1.80 m (5 ft 11 in)	85 kg (187 lb)	31 July 1995 (aged 30)	(Germany) Adler Mannheim
72	F	Dominik Kahun	1.80 m (5 ft 11 in)	79 kg (174 lb)	2 July 1995 (aged 30)	(Switzerland) Lausanne HC
73	F	Lukas Reichel	1.83 m (6 ft 0 in)	85 kg (187 lb)	17 May 2002 (aged 23)	(Canada) Abbotsford Canucks
74	F	Justin Schütz	1.80 m (5 ft 11 in)	86 kg (190 lb)	24 June 2000 (aged 25)	(Germany) Adler Mannheim
77	F	JJ Peterka	1.80 m (5 ft 11 in)	85 kg (187 lb)	14 January 2002 (aged 24)	(United States) Utah Mammoth
78	F	Nico Sturm	1.91 m (6 ft 3 in)	94 kg (207 lb)	3 May 1995 (aged 30)	(United States) Minnesota Wild
91	D	Moritz Müller	1.88 m (6 ft 2 in)	92 kg (203 lb)	19 November 1986 (aged 39)	(Germany) Kölner Haie
95	F	Frederik Tiffels	1.83 m (6 ft 0 in)	92 kg (203 lb)	20 May 1995 (aged 30)	(Germany) Eisbären Berlin

Group play

Pos	Team	Pld	W	OTW	OTL	L	GF	GA	GD	Pts	Qualification
1	United States	3	3	0	0	0	16	5	+11	9	Advance to quarterfinals
2	Germany	3	1	0	0	2	7	10	−3	3 (Note: Head-to-head points: 3 each. Head-to-head goal difference: Germany +1; Denmark 0; Latvia −1.)	Advance to qualification playoffs
3	Denmark	3	1	0	0	2	8	11	−3	3	Advance to qualification playoffs
4	Latvia	3	1	0	0	2	7	12	−5	3	Advance to qualification playoffs

Source: IIHF
Rules for classification: Tiebreak criteria
Notes:

12 February 2026; 21:10	Germany	3–1 (1–1, 2–0, 0–0)	Denmark	Fiera Milano, Milan; Attendance: 3,986

Game reference

Philipp Grubauer
Goalies
Frederik Andersen
Referees:
(Latvia) Andris Ansons
(Sweden) Christopher Holm
Linesmen:
(Czech Republic) Daniel Hynek
(Canada) Matt MacPherson

Draisaitl (Tiffels, Wagner) – 00:23	1–0
	1–1	13:09 – Mølgaard (Ehlers, Jensen Aabo)
Stützle (Peterka, Stachowiak) – 24:20	2–1
Stutzle (Draisaitl, Seider) (PP) – 30:02	3–1

0 min
Penalties
4 min
26
Shots
38

14 February 2026; 12:10	Germany	3–4 (2–1, 0–1, 1–2)	Latvia	Fiera Milano, Milan; Attendance: 4,033

Game reference

Philipp Grubauer
Goalies
Artūrs Šilovs
Referees:
(Canada) Gord Dwyer
(United States) Sean MacFarlane
Linesmen:
(Canada) Scott Cherrey
(Finland) Onni Hautamäki

Reichel (Kahun, Kälble) – 02:06	1–0
	1–1	15:48 – Ločmelis (Girgensons, Krastenbergs) (PP)
Kälble (Tiffels) – 16:56	2–1
	2–2	28:02 – Ločmelis (Balcers, Balinskis) (PP2)
	2–3	48:32 – Tralmaks (Girgensons, Jaks)
	2–4	51:37 – Krastenbergs (Daugaviņš, Šmits)
Stützle (Draisaitl, Peterka) (EA) – 57:41	3–4

8 min
Penalties
8 min
29
Shots
22

15 February 2026; 21:10	United States	5–1 (1–0, 2–0, 2–1)	Germany	PalaItalia, Milan; Attendance: 11,497

Game reference

Connor Hellebuyck
Goalies
Maximilian Franzreb
Referees:
(Czech Republic) Jan Hribik
(Canada) Wes McCauley
Linesmen:
(United States) Nick Briganti
(Canada) Jonny Murray

Werenski (Matthews) – 19:51	1–0
Matthews (Q. Hughes, M. Tkachuk) (PP) – 23:25	2–0
Faber (M. Tkachuk, B. Tkachuk – 37:35	3–0
Thompson (Larkin, Sanderson) – 41:55	4–0
Matthews (Sanderson, Hanifin) – 46:46	5–0
	5–1	51:22 – Stützle (Peterka)

6 min
Penalties
4 min
37
Shots
24

Qualification play-offs

17 February 2026; 12:10	Germany	5–1 (3–0, 0–1, 2–0)	France	PalaItalia, Milan; Attendance: 9,788

Game reference

Philipp Grubauer
Goalies
Julian Junca
Antoine Keller
Referees:
(Canada) Michael Campbell
(Sweden) Christopher Holm
Linesmen:
(Denmark) Albert Ankerstjerne
(Canada) David Brisebois

Draisaitl (Samanski, Stützle) (PP) – 03:40	1–0
Tiffels – 10:54	2–0
Peterka (Stützle) – 18:13	3–0
	3–1	24:02 – Bellemare (Perret)
Samanski (Draisaitl, Seider) (PP) – 47:01	4–1
Sturm (Draisaitl, Rieder) (EN) – 59:04	5–1

4 min
Penalties
6 min
36
Shots
31

Quarterfinal

18 February 2026; 12:10	Slovakia	6–2 (1–0, 3–1, 2–1)	Germany	PalaItalia, Milan; Attendance: 9,532

Game reference

Samuel Hlavaj
Goalies
Philipp Grubauer
Referees:
(Canada) Dan O'Rourke
(United States) Kyle Rehman
Linesmen:
(Denmark) Albert Ankerstjerne
(Canada) Matt MacPherson

Regenda (Černák, Fehérváry) – 18:06	1–0
Kelemen (Regenda) – 24:01	2–0
Okuliar (Hudáček, Dvorský) – 24:34	3–0
	3–1	34:59 – Reichel (Draisaitl)
Dvorský (Okuliar, Koch) – 30:21	4–1
Regenda (Koch, Pospíšil) – 40:58	5–1
	5–2	49:09 – Tiffels (Reichel, Müller) (PP)
Tatar (Ružička, Slafkovský) (EN) – 56:33	6–2

8 min
Penalties
6 min
35
Shots
27

=== Women's tournament ===
Germany women's national ice hockey team qualified a team of 23 players by winning a final qualification tournament.

Roster

The roster was announced on 7 January 2026.

Head coach: (Canada) Jeff MacLeod

No.	Pos.	Name	Height	Weight	Birthdate	Team
5	D	Charlott Schaffrath	1.84 m (6 ft 0 in)	72 kg (159 lb)	26 December 2005 (aged 20)	(Germany) ECDC Memmingen
7	F	Franziska Feldmeier	1.65 m (5 ft 5 in)	68 kg (150 lb)	5 February 1999 (aged 27)	(Germany) Eisbären Juniors Berlin
8	D	Ronja Hark – A	1.58 m (5 ft 2 in)	60 kg (130 lb)	17 August 2003 (aged 22)	(Germany) ECDC Memmingen
9	F	Svenja Voigt	1.65 m (5 ft 5 in)	60 kg (130 lb)	29 March 2004 (aged 21)	(United States) St. Cloud State Huskies
10	F	Katharina Häckelsmiller	1.65 m (5 ft 5 in)	63 kg (139 lb)	27 August 2004 (aged 21)	(Germany) ERC Ingolstadt
11	F	Nicola Hadraschek-Eisenschmid	1.66 m (5 ft 5 in)	68 kg (150 lb)	10 September 1996 (aged 29)	(Germany) ECDC Memmingen
13	F	Luisa Welcke	1.66 m (5 ft 5 in)	66 kg (146 lb)	29 April 2002 (aged 23)	(United States) Boston University Terriers
14	D	Carina Strobel	1.72 m (5 ft 8 in)	62 kg (137 lb)	11 September 1997 (aged 28)	(Germany) ECDC Memmingen
16	F	Jule Schiefer	1.73 m (5 ft 8 in)	68 kg (150 lb)	12 September 2001 (aged 24)	(Germany) ECDC Memmingen
17	F	Emily Nix	1.73 m (5 ft 8 in)	77 kg (170 lb)	12 January 1998 (aged 28)	(Sweden) Frölunda HC
20	D	Daria Gleißner – C	1.71 m (5 ft 7 in)	69 kg (152 lb)	30 June 1993 (aged 32)	(Germany) ECDC Memmingen
23	F	Lilli Welcke	1.66 m (5 ft 5 in)	66 kg (146 lb)	29 April 2002 (aged 23)	(United States) Boston University Terriers
25	F	Laura Kluge – A	1.79 m (5 ft 10 in)	63 kg (139 lb)	6 November 1996 (aged 29)	(United States) Boston Fleet
26	D	Tara Schmitz	1.65 m (5 ft 5 in)	61 kg (134 lb)	16 March 1998 (aged 27)	(Germany) Mad Dogs Mannheim
28	D	Nina Jobst-Smith	1.70 m (5 ft 7 in)	67 kg (148 lb)	30 August 2001 (aged 24)	(Canada) Vancouver Goldeneyes
29	F	Nina Christof	1.64 m (5 ft 5 in)	66 kg (146 lb)	18 August 2003 (aged 22)	(United States) RPI Engineers
34	F	Celina Haider	1.70 m (5 ft 7 in)	62 kg (137 lb)	20 July 2000 (aged 25)	(Germany) Eisbären Juniors Berlin
35	G	Sandra Abstreiter	1.81 m (5 ft 11 in)	78 kg (172 lb)	23 July 1998 (aged 27)	(Canada) Montreal Victoire
41	F	Mathilda Heine	1.70 m (5 ft 7 in)	69 kg (152 lb)	18 February 2009 (aged 16)	(Germany) Eisbären Juniors Berlin
44	D	Hanna Hoppe	1.64 m (5 ft 5 in)	62 kg (137 lb)	23 August 2006 (aged 19)	(Germany) ESC Dresden
70	G	Lisa Hemmerle	1.67 m (5 ft 6 in)	63 kg (139 lb)	11 December 1995 (aged 30)	(Germany) ERC Ingolstadt
71	F	Anne Bartsch	1.64 m (5 ft 5 in)	64 kg (141 lb)	22 September 1995 (aged 30)	(Germany) ECDC Memmingen
75	G	Chiara Schultes	1.67 m (5 ft 6 in)	62 kg (137 lb)	22 July 2005 (aged 20)	(Germany) ECDC Memmingen

Group play

Pos	Team	Pld	W	OTW	OTL	L	GF	GA	GD	Pts	Qualification
1	Sweden	4	4	0	0	0	18	2	+16	12	Quarter-finals
2	Germany	4	2	1	0	1	10	8	+2	8	Quarter-finals
3	Italy (H)	4	2	0	0	2	9	11	−2	6	Quarter-finals
4	Japan	4	1	0	0	3	7	14	−7	3	Eliminated
5	France	4	0	0	1	3	4	13	−9	1	Eliminated

Source: IIHF
Rules for classification: Tiebreakers
(H) Host

5 February 2026; 12:10 v	Sweden	4–1 (1–1, 2–0, 1–0)	Germany	Fiera Milano, Milan; Attendance: 2,455

Game reference

Ebba Svensson Träff
Goalies
Sandra Abstreiter
Referees:
(Canada) Shauna Neary
(Finland) Anniina Nurmi
Linesmen:
(United States) Sarah Buckner
(Finland) Tiina Saarimäki

	0–1	08:30 – Jobst-Smith (Lu. Welcke, Strobel) (PP)
Ljungblom (Wikner, Raunio) – 11:53	1–1
Ljungblom (L. Johansson, Lundin) (PP) – 27:03	2–1
Jungåker (L. Johansson, Raunio) (PP) – 39:20	3–1
T. Johansson (Svensson, Olsson) – 51:20	4–1

2 min
Penalties
8 min
37
Shots
16

7 February 2026; 12:10 v	Germany	5–2 (3–0, 2–2, 0–0)	Japan	Fiera Milano, Milan; Attendance: 3,777

Game reference

Sandra Abstreiter
Goalies
Miyuu Masuhara
Riko Kawaguchi
Referees:
(Czech Republic) Zuzana Svobodová
(United States) Amanada Tassoni
Linesmen:
(Canada) Laura Gutauskas
(Sweden) Jessica Lundgren

Gleißner (Lu. Welcke, Kluge) – 00:44	1–0
Nix (Hark, Hadraschek) – 08:44	2–0
Handraschek (Nix, Kluge) – 13:03	3–0
Handraschek (Kluge, Gleißner) – 25:24	4–0
Kluge (Haider, Hark) – 30:30	5–0
	5–1	36:45 – Miura (Ak. Shiga, Ao. Shiga)
	5–2	37:07 – Wajima (Seki, Miura)

6 min
Penalties
6 min
29
Shots
22

9 February 2026; 16:40 v	Germany	2–1 OT (1–0, 0–0, 0–1) (OT: 1–0)	France	Fiera Milano, Milan; Attendance: 3,632

Game reference

Sandra Abstreiter
Goalies
Alice Philbert
Referees:
(United States) Melissa Doyle
(Czech Republic) Zuzana Svobodová
Linesmen:
(Canada) Alexandra Clarke
(Canada) Justine Todd

Kluge (Gleißner, Hadraschek) (PP) – 19:25	1–0
	1–1	48:21 – Duvin (Le Scodan)
Jobst-Smith (Li. Welcke, Lu. Welcke) – 61:07	2–1

6 min
Penalties
10 min
47
Shots
14

10 February 2026; 16:40 v	Italy	1–2 (0–0, 1–1, 0–1)	Germany	Fiera Milano, Milan; Attendance: 3,898

Game reference

Gabriella Durante
Goalies
Sandra Abstreiter
Referees:
(Sweden) Ida Henriksson
(Canada) Cianna Murray
Linesmen:
(United States) Jennifer Cameron
(Canada) Erin Zach

Reyes (Caumo, Della Rovere) – 20:21	1–0
	1–1	32:47 – Nix (Kluge, Gleißner)
	1–2	58:31 – Kluge (Jobst-Smith)

10 min
Penalties
8 min
24
Shots
24

Quarterfinals

14 February 2026; 16:40 v	Canada	5–1 (2–0, 1–0, 2–1)	Germany	Fiera Milano, Milan; Attendance: 3,913

Game reference

Emerance Maschmeyer
Goalies
Sandra Abstreiter
Referees:
(United States) Melissa Doyle
(Finland) Anniina Nurmi
Linesmen:
(United States) Jennifer Cameron
(Czech Republic) Kristýna Hájková

Jenner (Maltais, Jaques) – 01:40	1–0
Thompson (O'Neill) – 16:41	2–0
Fillier (Fast, Watts) (PP) – 37:30	3–0
Turnbull (Clark) – 40:38	4–0
	4–1	48:42 – Feldmeier (SH)
Poulin (Fillier, Watts) (PP) – 55:30	5–1

6 min
Penalties
14 min
43
Shots
11

== Luge ==
Germany qualified 3 singles sleds in each gender, 2 men's doubles sleds and one women's doubles sled.

Men

Athlete	Event	Run 1		Run 2		Run 3		Run 4		Total	
Athlete	Event	Time	Rank	Time	Rank	Time	Rank	Time	Rank	Time	Rank
Timon Grancagnolo	Singles	53.406	8	53.438	10	53.501	10	53.147	6	3:33.492	9
Max Langenhan	Singles	52.924	1	52.902	1	52.705	1	52.660	1	3:31.191	1st place, gold medalist(s)
Felix Loch	Singles	53.418	9	53.327	6	53.160	5	53.146	5	3:33.051	6
Tobias Arlt; Tobias Wendl	Doubles	52.583	5	52.593	2	—N/a				1:45.176	3rd place, bronze medalist(s)
Toni Eggert; Florian Müller	Doubles	52.579	4	52.690	6	—N/a				1:45.269	4

Women

Athlete	Event	Run 1		Run 2		Run 3		Run 4		Total	
Athlete	Event	Time	Rank	Time	Rank	Time	Rank	Time	Rank	Time	Rank
Anna Berreiter	Singles	53.051	10	53.004	10	53.009	6	52.946	8	3:32.010	6
Merle Fräbel	Singles	52.590	1	52.659	2	54.144	20	52.779	2	3:32.172	8
Julia Taubitz	Singles	52.638	2	52.550	1	52.730	1	52.707	1	3:30.625	1st place, gold medalist(s)
Dajana Eitberger; Magdalena Matschina	Doubles	53.124	2	53.280	2	—N/a				1:46.404	2nd place, silver medalist(s)

Mixed team relay

Athlete	Event	Women's singles		Men's doubles		Men's singles		Women's doubles		Total	
Athlete	Event	Time	Rank	Time	Rank	Time	Rank	Time	Rank	Time	Rank
Julia Taubitz; Tobias Wendl / Tobias Arlt; Max Langenhan; Dajana Eitberger / Magdalena Matschina	Team relay	55.633	1	55.219	1	54.691	1	56.129	1	3:41.672	1st place, gold medalist(s)

== Nordic combined ==
DOSB announced the three athletes participating on 20 January 2026.

Athlete	Event	Ski jumping			Cross-country		Total	
Athlete	Event	Distance	Points	Rank	Time	Rank	Time	Rank
Vinzenz Geiger	Individual normal hill/10 km	98.0	125.3	8	31:22.4	12	31:51.4	10
Vinzenz Geiger	Individual large hill/10 km	120.5	124.3	18	24:38.1	3	26:21.1	9
Johannes Rydzek	Individual normal hill/10 km	97.0	122.0	12	30:26.8	7	31:08.8	8
Johannes Rydzek	Individual large hill/10 km	123.5	129.2	15	24:59.2	8	26:22.2	10
Julian Schmid	Individual normal hill/10 km	100.0	121.9	13	32:12.4	16	32:55.4	14
Julian Schmid	Individual large hill/10 km	124.5	126.2	16	25:32.1	14	27:07.1	12
Johannes Rydzek; Vinzenz Geiger	Team sprint	245.5	246.5	1	42:24.1	5	42:24.1	5

== Skeleton ==
Based on the world rankings, Germany qualified 6 sleds.

Athlete	Event	Run 1		Run 2		Run 3		Run 4		Total	
Athlete	Event	Time	Rank	Time	Rank	Time	Rank	Time	Rank	Time	Rank
Christopher Grotheer	Men's	56.39	4	56.16	3	55.92	3	55.93	2	3:44.40	3rd place, bronze medalist(s)
Axel Jungk	Men's	56.27	2	56.12	2	55.72	2	56.10	5	3:44.21	2nd place, silver medalist(s)
Felix Keisinger	Men's	56.44	6	56.53	8	55.93	5	56.24	7	3:45.14	6
Susanne Kreher	Women's	57.24	2	57.28	3	57.43	2	57.37	3	3:49.32	2nd place, silver medalist(s)
Hannah Neise	Women's	57.45	5	57.40	4	57.59	5	57.73	6	3:50.17	4
Jacqueline Pfeifer	Women's	57.43	4	57.18	1	57.56	4	57.29	2	3:49.46	3rd place, bronze medalist(s)
Susanne Kreher; Axel Jungk	Mixed team	1:00.59	3	58.94	2	—N/a				1:59.53	2nd place, silver medalist(s)
Jacqueline Pfeifer; Christopher Grotheer	Mixed team	1:00.53	2	59.01	4	—N/a				1:59.54	3rd place, bronze medalist(s)

== Ski jumping ==
DOSB announced 4 men and 4 women participating on 20 January 2026.

Men

Athlete	Event	First round			Second round			Final round			Total	
Athlete	Event	Distance	Points	Rank	Distance	Points	Rank	Distance	Points	Rank	Points	Rank
Felix Hoffmann	Normal hill	100.0	128.5	13 Q	—N/a			102.5	128.8	15	257.3	13
Felix Hoffmann	Large hill	126.0	122.8	24 Q	—N/a			126.5	114.7	25	237.5	25
Pius Paschke	Normal hill	101.0	126.1	17 Q	—N/a			101.5	125.7	22	251.8	23
Pius Paschke	Large hill	125.0	122.6	27 Q	—N/a			127.0	116.6	24	239.2	24
Philipp Raimund	Normal hill	102.0	135.6	1 Q	—N/a			106.5	138.5	1	274.1	1st place, gold medalist(s)
Philipp Raimund	Large hill	131.0	135.2	10 Q	—N/a			136.0	142.2	9	277.4	9
Andreas Wellinger	Normal hill	102.5	125.1	18 Q	—N/a			104.0	129.4	13	254.5	17
Andreas Wellinger	Large hill	127.0	130.5	15 Q	—N/a			127.5	127.0	18	257.5	15
Andreas Wellinger; Philipp Raimund	Large hill super team	264.5	273.3	4 Q	261.0	264.4	5 Q	Cancelled			537.7	4

Women

Athlete	Event	First round			Final round			Total	
Athlete	Event	Distance	Points	Rank	Distance	Points	Rank	Points	Rank
Selina Freitag	Normal hill	94.5	123.2	11 Q	97.5	121.5	6	244.7	7
Selina Freitag	Large hill	115.5	103.0	28 Q	124.0	126.7	12	229.7	17
Agnes Reisch	Normal hill	92.0	123.4	9 Q	93.0	117.9	9	241.3	9
Agnes Reisch	Large hill	111.0	116.2	13 Q	123.0	128.0	11	244.2	10
Katharina Schmid	Normal hill	89.0	116.4	18 Q	97.5	117.7	10	234.1	16
Katharina Schmid	Large hill	96.5	83.2	42	Did not advance				
Juliane Seyfarth	Normal hill	88.0	106.9	32	Did not advance				
Juliane Seyfarth	Large hill	119.0	121.0	9 Q	109.0	96.2	27	217.2	23

Mixed

Athlete	Event	First round			Final			Total	
Athlete	Event	Distance	Points	Rank	Distance	Points	Rank	Points	Rank
Agnes Reisch; Felix Hoffmann; Selina Freitag; Philipp Raimund	Mixed team	385.5	502.1	4	399.5	530.7	2	1032.8	4

== Ski mountaineering ==
Germany qualified two female and one male ski mountaineer through the 2025 ISMF World Championships.

Athlete	Event	Heat		Semifinal		Final	
Athlete	Event	Time	Rank	Time	Rank	Time	Rank
Finn Hösch	Men's sprint	2:51.99	4	Did not advance			
Helena Euringer	Women's sprint	3:27.79	5	Did not advance			
Tatjana Paller	Women's sprint	3:11.20	2 Q	3:12.09	2 Q	3:13.26	4
Finn Hösch; Tatjana Paller	Mixed relay	—N/a				28:39.48	7

== Snowboarding ==
DOSB announced the 10 men and 9 women participating on 20 January 2026.

Alpine
Men

Athlete	Event	Qualification		Round of 16	Quarterfinal	Semifinal	Final	
Athlete	Event	Time	Rank	Opposition Time	Opposition Time	Opposition Time	Opposition Time	Rank
Yannik Angenend	Parallel giant slalom	1:28.13	25	Did not advance				
Stefan Baumeister	Parallel giant slalom	1:27.76	18	Did not advance				
Elias Huber	Parallel giant slalom	1:27.44	12 Q	Zamfirov (BUL); L +0.03	Did not advance			
Max Kühnhauser	Parallel giant slalom	1:28.11	24	Did not advance				

Women

Athlete	Event	Qualification		Round of 16	Quarterfinal	Semifinal	Final	
Athlete	Event	Time	Rank	Opposition Time	Opposition Time	Opposition Time	Opposition Time	Rank
Melanie Hochreiter	Parallel giant slalom	1:36.64	20	Did not advance				
Ramona Hofmeister	Parallel giant slalom	1:33.47	7 Q	Zamfirova (BUL); W –0.02	Maděrová (CZE); L DNF	Did not advance		
Cheyenne Loch	Parallel giant slalom	1:35.40	15 Q	Maděrová (CZE); L +0.36	Did not advance			
Mathilda Scheid	Parallel giant slalom	1:38.63	26	Did not advance				

Cross

Athlete	Event	Seeding		1/8 final	Quarterfinal	Semifinal	Final	
Athlete	Event	Time	Rank	Position	Position	Position	Position	Rank
Niels Conradt	Men's	1:09.43	16	4	Did not advance			
Martin Nörl	Men's	1:09.09	14	2 Q	3	Did not advance		
Julius Reichle	Men's	1:11.64	31	4	Did not advance			
Leon Ulbricht	Men's	1:07.94	3	1 Q	4	Did not advance		
Jana Fischer	Women's	1:14.40	10	2 Q	3	Did not advance		
Leon Ulbricht; Jana Fischer	Mixed team	—N/a			2 Q	3 FB	3	7

Park & Pipe

Athlete	Event	Qualification					Final				
Athlete	Event	Run 1	Run 2	Run 3	Best	Rank	Run 1	Run 2	Run 3	Best	Rank
Christoph Lechner	Men's halfpipe	5.00	DNI	—N/a	5.00	24	Did not advance				
Noah Vicktor	Men's big air	10.00	DNI	63.50	73.50	30	Did not advance				
Noah Vicktor	Men's slopestyle	~~26.81~~	34.81	—N/a	34.81	23	Did not advance				
Kona Ettel	Women's halfpipe	~~38.25~~	43.25	—N/a	43.25	18	Did not advance				
Leilani Ettel	Women's halfpipe	~~54.50~~	67.50	—N/a	67.50	13	Did not advance				
Anne Hedrich	Women's halfpipe	~~14.75~~	36.25	—N/a	36.25	21	Did not advance				
Annika Morgan	Women's big air	67.75	85.00	~~18.50~~	152.75	13	Did not advance				
Annika Morgan	Women's slopestyle	~~61.31~~	69.53	—N/a	69.53	8 Q	~~77.65~~	78.78	~~37.01~~	78.78	4

== Speed skating ==
Germany qualified a maximum of fifteen speed skaters (seven men and eight women) through performances at the 2025-26 ISU Speed Skating World Cup., but DOSB opted to nominate 13 skaters.

Men

Athlete	Event	Race	
Athlete	Event	Time	Rank
Hendrik Dombek	500 m	35.46	28
Hendrik Dombek	1000 m	1:09.198	16
Hendrik Dombek	1500 m	1:46.52	19
Moritz Klein	500 m	35.21	25
Moritz Klein	1000 m	1:09.195	15
Moritz Klein	1500 m	1:46.54	20
Finn Sonnekalb	1000 m	1:08.80	12
Finn Sonnekalb	1500 m	1:45.64	13
Gabriel Groß	5000 m	6:14.40	10
Felix Maly	5000 m	6:21.42	17
Fridtjof Petzold	5000 m	6:27.56	19

Women

Athlete	Event	Race	
Athlete	Event	Time	Rank
Anna Ostlender	500 m	39.02	27
Anna Ostlender	1000 m	1:16.83	21
Sophie Warmuth	500 m	37.75	8
Lea Sophie Scholz	1500 m	1:57.68	18
Josie Hofmann	3000 m	4:06.54	14
Maira Jasch	5000 m	7:00.94	8

Mass start

Athlete	Event	Semifinal			Final		
Athlete	Event	Points	Time	Rank	Points	Time	Rank
Felix Maly	Men's	0	7:46.65	13	Did not advance		
Fridtjof Petzold	Men's	0	8:00.76	14	Did not advance		
Josie Hofmann	Women's	0	8:45.54	11	Did not advance		
Maira Jasch	Women's	1	8:39.72	9	Did not advance		

Team pursuit

Athlete	Event	Quarterfinal		Semifinal		Final	
Athlete	Event	Opposition Time	Rank	Opposition Time	Rank	Opposition Time	Rank
Patrick Beckert; Felix Maly; Fridtjof Petzold	Men's	3:45.28	7 FD	Did not advance		Final D Japan; W 3:45.25	7
Josie Hofmann; Josephine Schlörb; Lea Sophie Scholz	Women's	3:00.52	5 FC	Did not advance		Final C Belgium; W 3:00.65	5

== See also ==
- Germany at the 2026 Winter Paralympics
