= Cross-country skiing at the 2026 Winter Olympics =

Cross-country skiing at the XXV Olympic Winter Games
- Cross-country skiing pictogram
- Venue: Cross country and biathlon center Fabio Canal
- Dates: 7–22 February 2026
- No. of events: 12 (6 men, 6 women)

Cross-country skiing at the 2026 Winter Olympics was held at the Cross country and biathlon center Fabio Canal in Tesero, Italy.

A total of 12 events were contested, six each for men and women. For the first time, women raced the same distances as men.

== Competition schedule ==
The competition schedule for all twelve events was as follows.

All times are (UTC+1).

Date	Time	Event
7 February	13:00	Women's skiathlon
8 February	12:30	Men's skiathlon
10 February	09:15	Men's and women's individual sprint classical
12 February	13:00	Women's 10 km freestyle
13 February	11:45	Men's 10 km freestyle
14 February	12:00	Women's 4 × 7.5 km relay
15 February	12:00	Men's 4 × 7.5 km relay
18 February	09:45	Women's and men's team sprint freestyle
21 February	11:00	Men's 50 km mass start classical
22 February	10:00	Women's 50 km mass start classical

== Medal summary ==
=== Medal table ===
* Host nation (Italy)

Rank	Nation	Gold	Silver	Bronze	Total
1	Norway	7	2	5	14
2	Sweden	5	4	1	10
3	France	0	3	0	3
4	United States	0	2	1	3
5	Switzerland	0	1	1	2
6	Italy*	0	0	2	2
7	Finland	0	0	1	1
7	Germany	0	0	1	1
Totals (8 entries)		12	12	12	36

=== Men's events ===
Event	Gold		Silver		Bronze	
10 kilometre freestyle	Johannes Høsflot Klæbo; Norway	20:36.2	Mathis Desloges; France	20:41.1	Einar Hedegart; Norway	20:50.2
20 kilometre skiathlon	Johannes Høsflot Klæbo; Norway	46:11.0	Mathis Desloges; France	46:13.0	Martin Løwstrøm Nyenget; Norway	46:13.1
50 kilometre classical	Johannes Høsflot Klæbo; Norway	2:06:44.8	Martin Løwstrøm Nyenget; Norway	2:06:53.7	Emil Iversen; Norway	2:07:15.5
4 × 7.5 kilometre relay	Norway; Emil Iversen; Martin Løwstrøm Nyenget; Einar Hedegart; Johannes Høsflot Klæbo	1:04:24.5	France; Théo Schely; Hugo Lapalus; Mathis Desloges; Victor Lovera	1:04:46.7	Italy; Davide Graz; Elia Barp; Martino Carollo; Federico Pellegrino	1:05:12.4
Sprint classical	Johannes Høsflot Klæbo; Norway	3:39.74	Ben Ogden; United States	3:40.61	Oskar Opstad Vike; Norway	3:46.55
Team sprint freestyle	Norway; Einar Hedegart; Johannes Høsflot Klæbo	18:28.9	United States; Ben Ogden; Gus Schumacher	18:30.3	Italy; Elia Barp; Federico Pellegrino	18:32.2

=== Women's events ===
Event	Gold		Silver		Bronze	
10 kilometre freestyle	Frida Karlsson; Sweden	22:49.2	Ebba Andersson; Sweden	23:35.8	Jessie Diggins; United States	23:38.9
20 kilometre skiathlon	Frida Karlsson; Sweden	53:45.2	Ebba Andersson; Sweden	54:36.2	Heidi Weng; Norway	55:11.9
50 kilometre classical	Ebba Andersson; Sweden	2:16:28.2	Heidi Weng; Norway	2:18:43.5	Nadja Kälin; Switzerland	2:23:09.7
4 × 7.5 kilometre relay	Norway; Kristin Austgulen Fosnæs; Astrid Øyre Slind; Karoline Simpson-Larsen; Heidi Weng	1:15:44.8	Sweden; Linn Svahn; Ebba Andersson; Frida Karlsson; Jonna Sundling	1:16:35.7	Finland; Johanna Matintalo; Kerttu Niskanen; Vilma Ryytty; Jasmi Joensuu	1:16:59.5
Sprint classical	Linn Svahn; Sweden	4:03.05	Jonna Sundling; Sweden	4:04.64	Maja Dahlqvist; Sweden	4:07.88
Team sprint freestyle	Sweden; Jonna Sundling; Maja Dahlqvist	20:29.99	Switzerland; Nadja Kälin; Nadine Fähndrich	20:31.39	Germany; Laura Gimmler; Coletta Rydzek	20:35.86
