= Théo Schely =

French cross-country skier (born 1999)

Personal information
- Nationality: French
- Born: 6 September 1999 (age 27) Annecy, France

Sport
- Sport: Cross-country skiing
Medal record
Men's cross-country skiing
Representing France
Olympic Games
| Silver medal – second place | 2026 Milano Cortina | 4 × 7.5 km relay |

Théo Schely (born 6 September 1999) is a French cross-country skier. He represented France at the 2026 Winter Olympics in cross-country skiing and won a silver medal in the 4 × 7.5 kilometre relay.
