= Zak Ketterson =

American cross-country skier (born 1997)

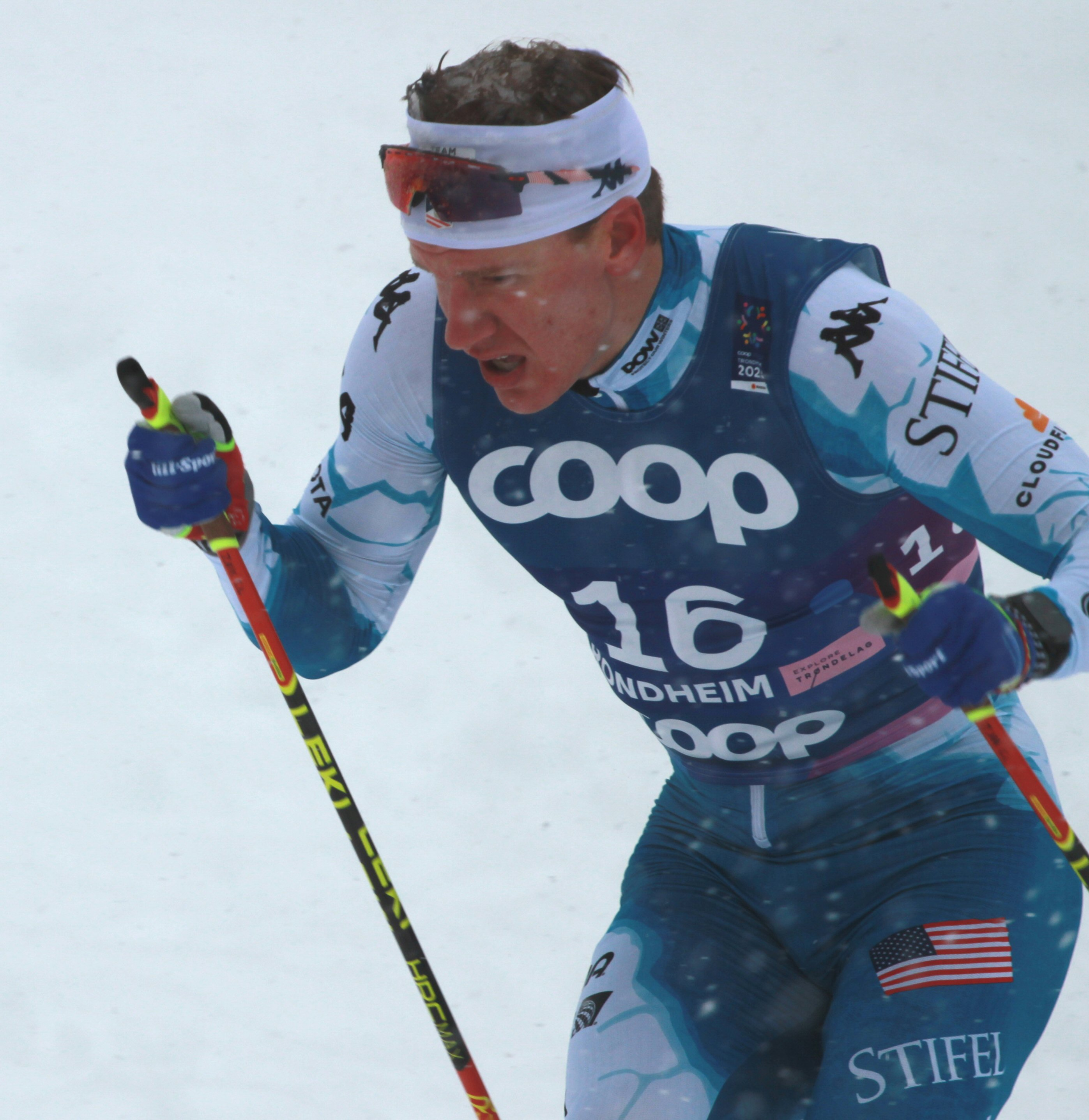
- Ketterson in 2025

Personal information
- Born: April 2, 1997 (age 29) Michigan, United States

Sport
- Country: United States
- Sport: Cross-country skiing

Zak Ketterson (born April 2, 1997) is an American cross-country skier. He represented the United States at the 2026 Winter Olympics.

== Early life and education ==
Ketterson's father, Jim, ran cross country and track at Carleton College, while his mother, Brigette, competed in Nordic skiing at the same institution, earning All-American honors and contributing to the 1984 national championship relay team that led to her induction into the school's Hall of Fame in 2015. His older brother, Jan, competed in track, cross country and Nordic skiing at Dartmouth College.

He attended Northern Michigan University, where he was a three-time NCAA All-American and named the CCSA Skier of the Year in 2019.

== Career ==
In January 2026, Ketterson was selected to represent the United States at the 2026 Winter Olympics. On February 13, 2026, he competed in the 10 kilometre freestyle and finished in 38th place.
