= Hunter Wonders =

American cross-country skier (born 1998)

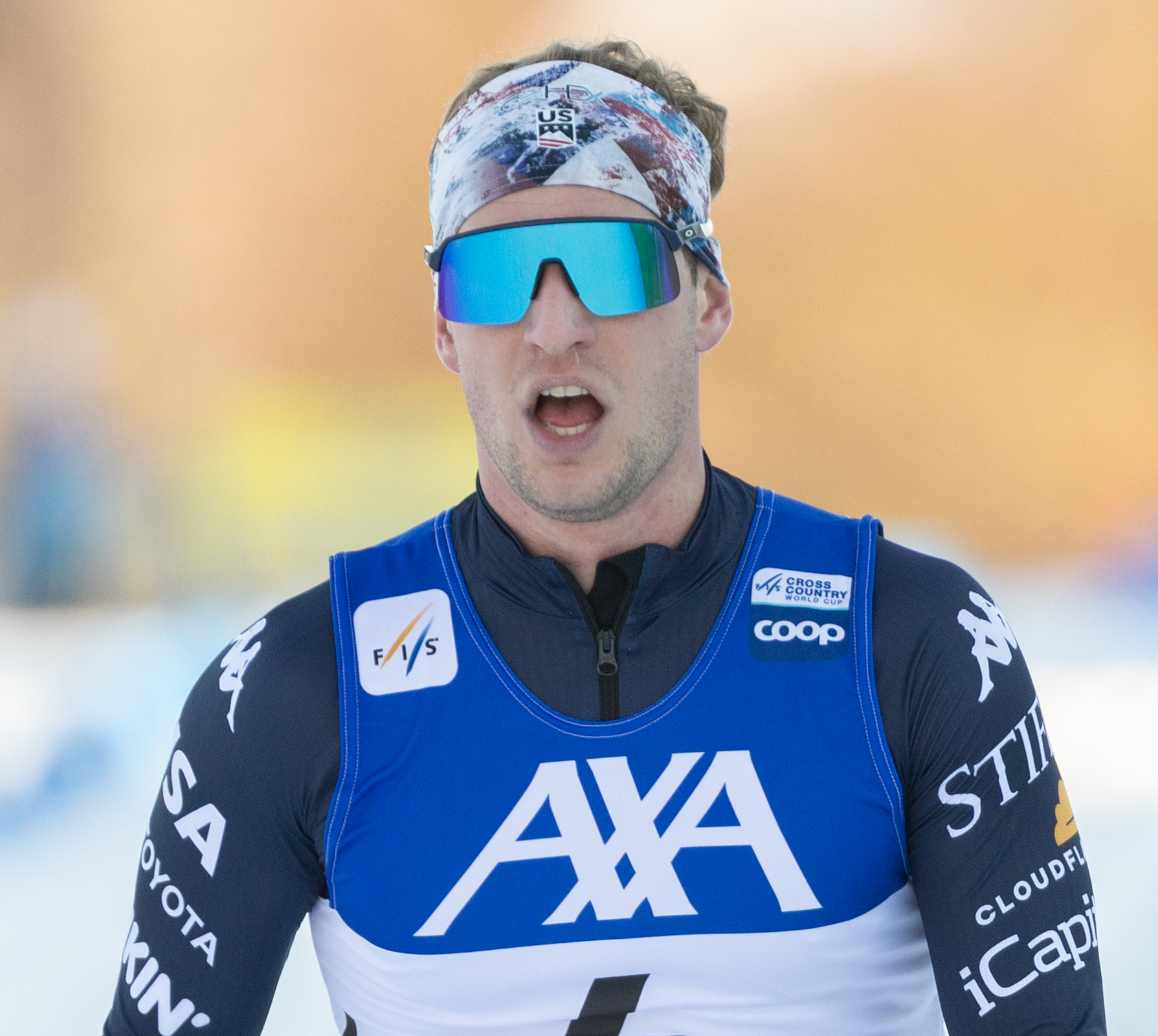
- Wonders in 2026

Personal information
- Born: August 7, 1998 (age 28) Anchorage, Alaska, U.S.

Sport
- Sport: Skiing
- Club: Alaska Pacific University Nordic Ski Center

Hunter Wonders (born August 7, 1998) is an American cross-country skier who has competed internationally in FIS competitions and the FIS Cross-Country World Cup. He has represented the United States in major international events including the World Championships and the Youth Olympic Winter Games. Wonders is a member of the U.S. cross-country skiing program and previously competed for the Alaska Pacific University Nordic Ski Center.

== Early life and education ==
Wonders was born in Anchorage, Alaska, United States. He grew up in Alaska and began skiing at a young age, developing within the region's strong Nordic skiing culture. He later joined the Alaska Pacific University Nordic Ski Center program, a well-known training base for elite American cross-country skiers.

== Career ==
Wonders emerged as a competitive skier during his junior years. He competed at the 2016 Winter Youth Olympics in Lillehammer, where he recorded several top-30 finishes. He later competed in the FIS Nordic Junior World Ski Championships, where he was part of the United States relay team that won a silver medal in the 4×5 km event in 2018.

=== Senior career ===
Wonders made his FIS World Cup debut on January 23, 2021 in the 30 km skiathlon event in Lahti, Finland.

He represented the United States at multiple international competitions including the FIS Nordic World Ski Championships and World Cup events. During the 2022–23 season he recorded several strong results on the World Cup circuit, including a career-best performance of 11th place in a distance event during the Tour de Ski.

Over his career he competed in a range of international competitions including World Cups, Nor-Am Cups, U23 World Championships, and U.S. National Championships.

=== Retirement and later activities ===
In 2023, Wonders announced that he would step away from full-time World Cup racing after several seasons with the U.S. team. During his career he became known for his steady improvement in distance events and regular top-30 finishes at the World Cup level.

Outside of skiing, Wonders has pursued aviation training and has worked toward obtaining a private pilot license.

== Personal life ==
Wonders grew up in Anchorage, Alaska. In addition to skiing, he has interests in outdoor activities such as cycling, hiking, and backcountry skiing.
