= Martino Carollo =

Italian cross-country skier (born 2003)

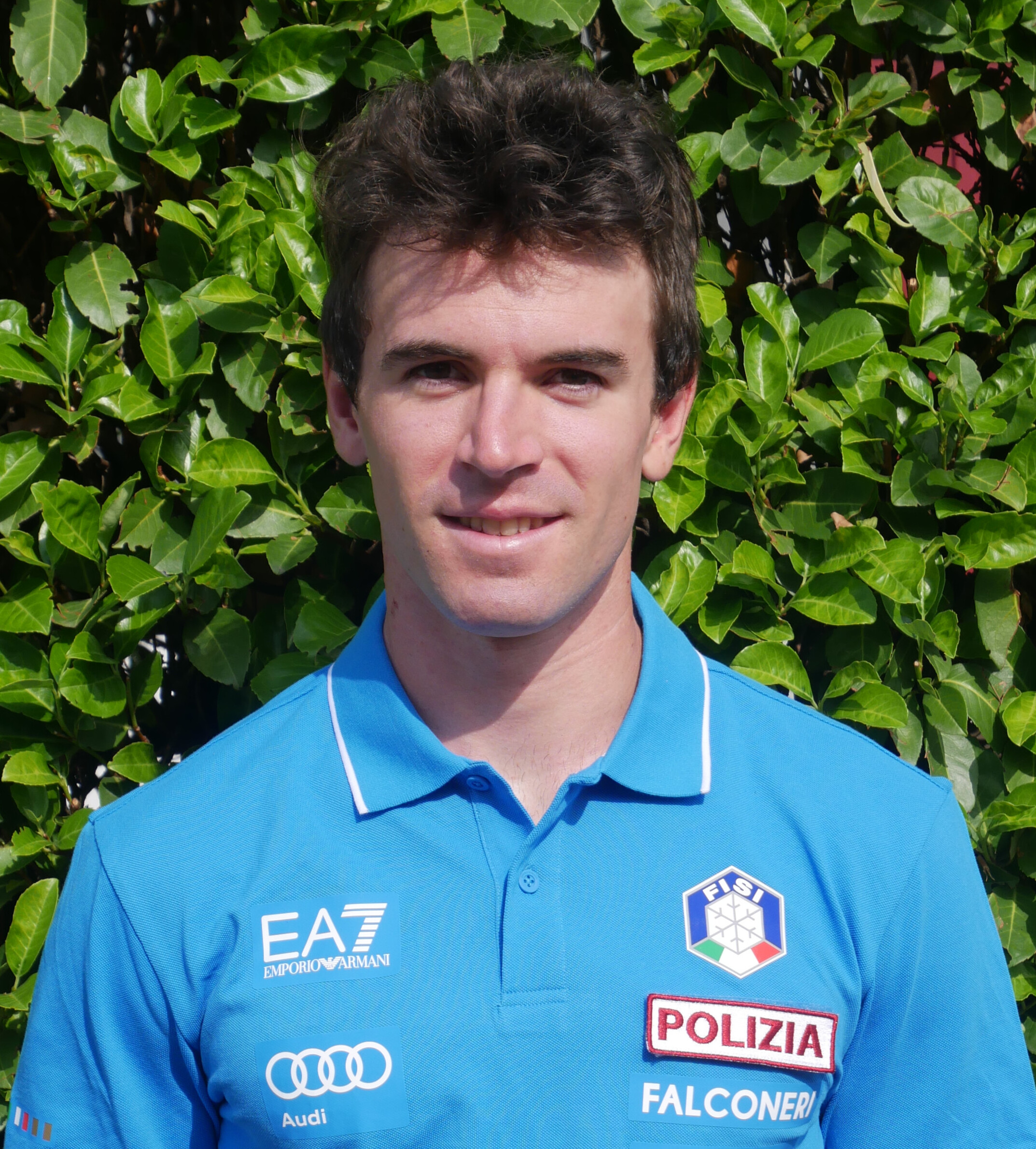
- Carollo in 2025

Personal information
- Born: 19 June 2003 (age 23) Borgo San Dalmazzo, Italy

Sport
- Sport: Cross-country skiing
Medal record
Men's cross-country skiing
Representing Italy
Olympic Games
Bronze medal – third place	2026 Milano Cortina	4 × 7.5 km relay

Martino Carollo (born 19 June 2003) is an Italian cross-country skier. He represented Italy at the 2026 Winter Olympics in cross-country skiing and won a bronze medal in the 4 × 7.5 kilometre relay.
