= Tom Stephen =

Canadian cross-country skier (born 2002)

Personal information
- Nationality: Canada
- Born: March 30, 2002 (age 24) Calgary, Alberta, Canada

Sport
- Sport: Skiing
Medal record
FIS Nordic Junior World Ski Championships
Silver medal – second place	2020 Oberwiesenthal	Junior 4 × 5 kilometre relay
- Updated on December 23, 2025

Thomas Stephen (born March 30, 2002) is a Canadian cross-country skier. Stephen became the first Canadian male to ever win a gold medal at the Nordic Junior World Ski Championships.

== Career ==
Stephen competed at the 2020 Nordic Junior World Ski Championships in Germany, and was part of the silver medal-winning junior men's relay in the junior division. The following year at the 2021 Nordic Junior World Ski Championships, Stephen finished 12th in the sprint event and fifth in the mass start.

At the 2025 Canadian Olympic trials in Vernon, British Columbia, Stephen won the 10 km classical event, clinching his spot on Canada's 2026 Olympic team. The race was Stephen's first of the season and he had only returned to the snow ten days before the race after nursing a back injury.

On December 19, 2025, Stephen was officially named to Canada's 2026 Olympic team.
