= Gustaf Berglund (skier) =

Swedish cross-country skier (born 1998)

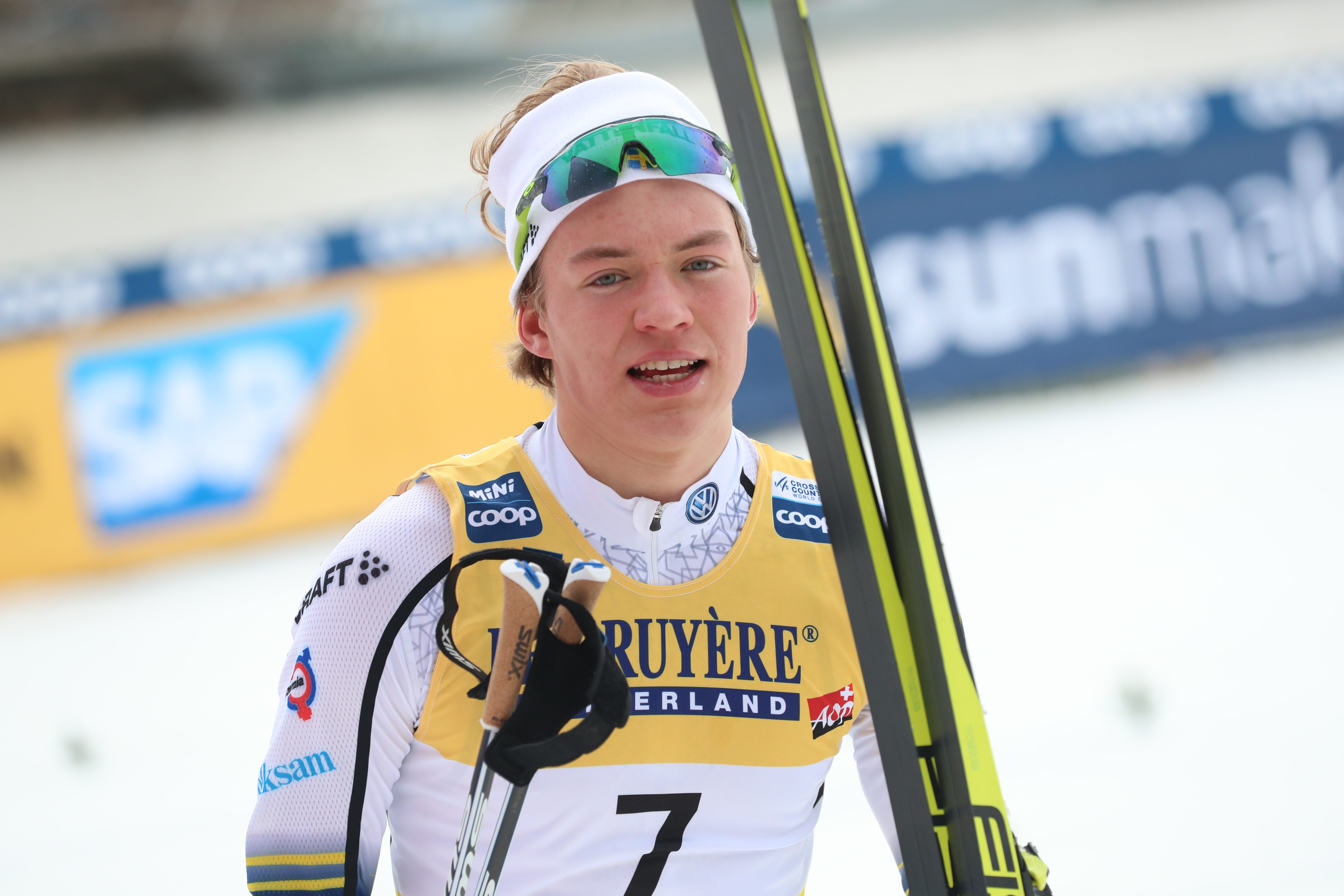
- Gustaf Berglund in 2019

Personal information
- Full name: Högosta Axel Gustaf Berglund
- Nationality: Sweden
- Born: 4 May 1998 (age 28)

Sport
- Sport: Skiing
- Club: IFK Mora

Högosta Axel Gustaf Berglund (born 4 May 1998) is a Swedish cross-country skier. He made his World Cup debut in January 2019. At the FIS Nordic World Ski Championships 2025 he placed eight in the Men's 50 kilometre freestyle. He participated in the 2026 Winter Olympics.

He is in a relationship with fellow skier Ebba Andersson.
