= Arsi Ruuskanen =

Finnish cross-country skier (born 1999)

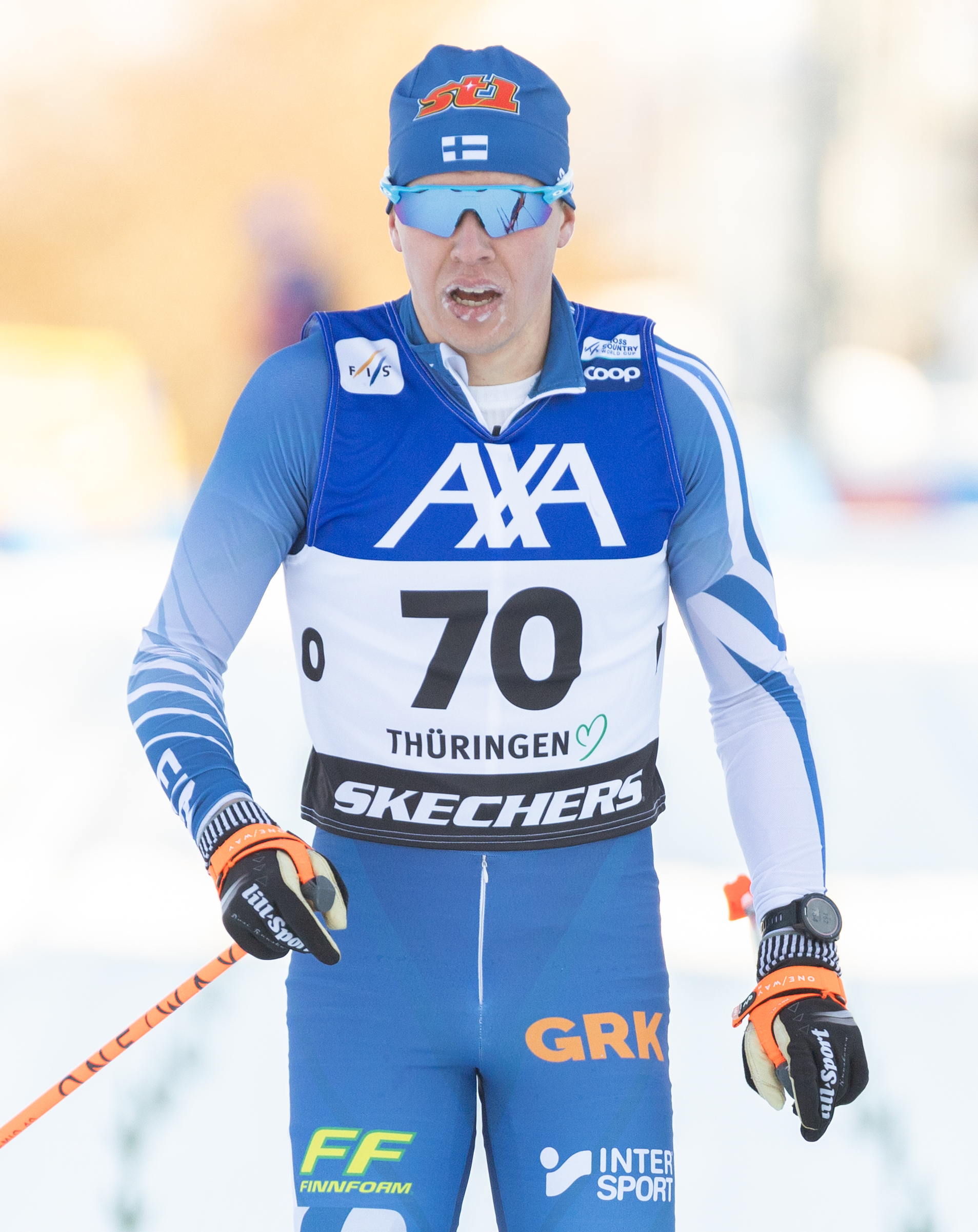
- Ruuskanen in Oberhof, 2026.

Personal information
- Nationality: Finland
- Born: 21 September 1999 (age 26) Siilinjärvi, Finland

Sport
- Sport: Skiing
- Club: Kuusamon Erä-Veikot

World Cup career
- Seasons: 3 – (2021–present)
- Indiv. starts: 55
- Indiv. podiums: 0
Medal record
Men's cross-country skiing
Representing Finland
U23 World Championships
Gold medal – first place	2022 Lygna	10 km classical
- Updated on 28 February 2026

Arsi Ruuskanen (born 21 September 1999) is a Finnish cross-country skier. He is best known for winning a gold medal at the 2022 Nordic Junior World Ski Championships (U23).

== Career ==
He grew up in Siilinjärvi. At the Junior World Championships he competed in 2019, 2021 (U23) and 2022 (U23). At the latter competition, he won the gold medal in the 15 kilometre classic race and finished fifth in the relay.

He made his World Cup debut in November 2021 in Ruka, earning his first World Cup points the following year at the same venue. A breakthrough came with his 8th place in the 20-kilometre freestyle race in Davos in December 2022.

Ruuskanen also competed at the 2023 World Championships, but crashed during the 30 kilometre skiathlon, injured himself, and had to pull out of the championship. He finished 24th overall in the 2023–24 Tour de Ski, having made a jump in the standings with a 9th place in the final stage.
