= Victor Lovera =

French cross-country skier (born 2000)

Personal information
- Born: 5 June 2000 (age 26) Saint-Martin-d'Hères, France

Sport
- Sport: Cross-country skiing
Medal record
Men's cross-country skiing
Representing France
Olympic Games
Silver medal – second place	2026 Milano Cortina	4 × 7.5 km relay

Victor Lovera (born 5 June 2000) is a French cross-country skier. He represented France at the 2026 Winter Olympics.

== Career ==
In January 2026, Lovera was selected to represent the France at the 2026 Winter Olympics. He won a silver medal in the 4 × 7.5 kilometre relay.

== Personal life ==
Lovera's father, Jean Lovera, is a former professional tennis player.
