= Even Northug =

Norwegian cross-country skier (born 1995)

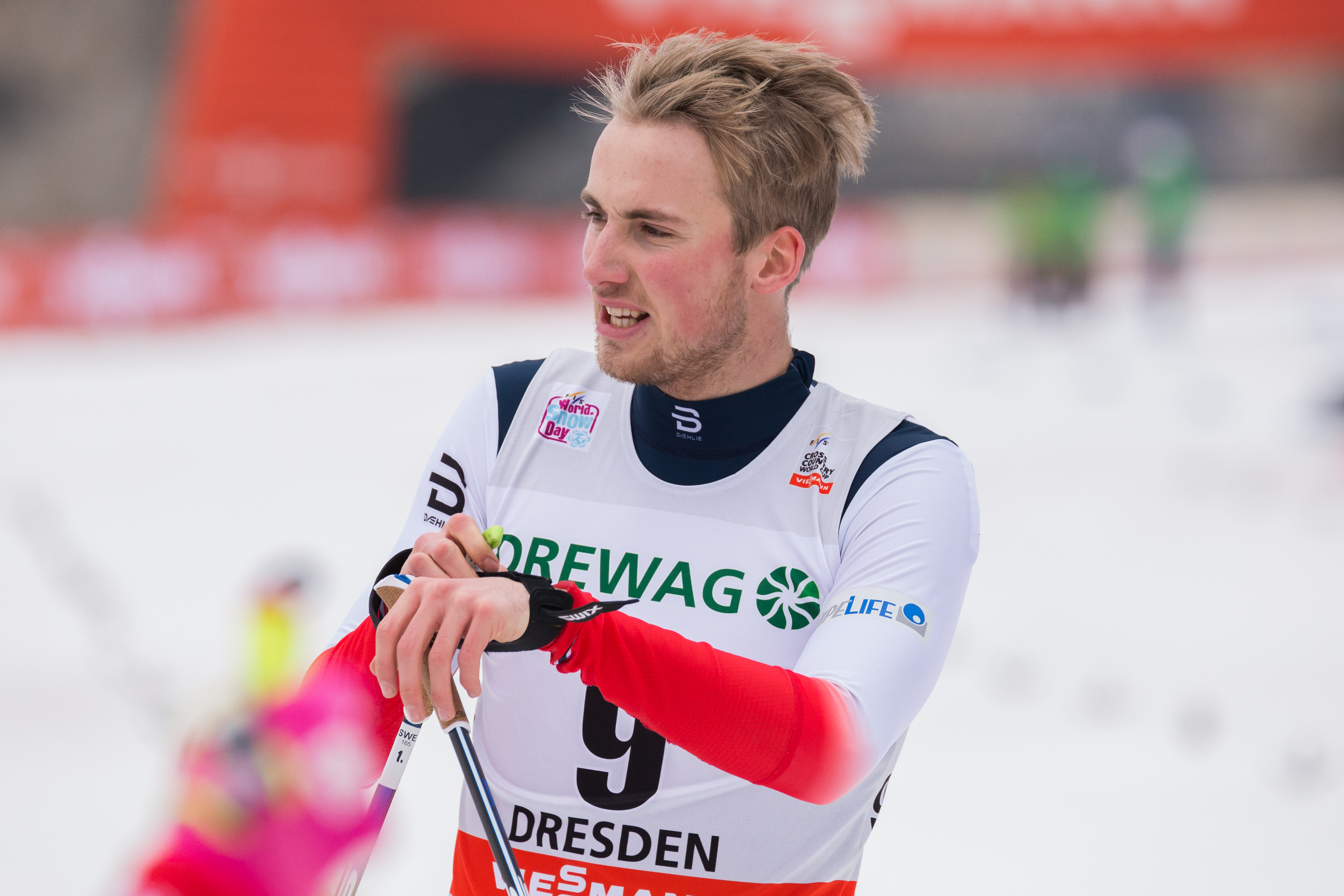

Personal information
- Nationality: Norway
- Born: 26 September 1995 (age 30) Mosvik Municipality, Norway

Sport
- Sport: Skiing

World Cup career
- Seasons: 10 – (2015–2016, 2018–present)
- Indiv. starts: 55
- Indiv. podiums: 8
- Indiv. wins: 0
- Team starts: 7
- Team podiums: 4
- Team wins: 3
- Overall titles: 0 – (17th in 2023)
- Discipline titles: 0
Medal record
Men's cross-country skiing
Representing Norway
U23 World Championships
Bronze medal – third place	2018 Goms	Individual sprint
- Updated on 22 March 2025

Even Northug (born 26 September 1995) is a Norwegian cross-country skier.

He competed at the 2014 World Junior Championships, finishing ninth in the sprint race. In the U23 class he competed at the 2016 and 2018 World Junior Championships, claiming the sprint bronze medal in 2018.

He made his World Cup debut in March 2015 in Drammen, a sprint race. Competing in nothing but sprint, he collected his first World Cup points a year later in Drammen with an eighth place. Following another eighth place in December 2017 in Lillehammer, he improved to a sixth place in January 2018 in Dresden.

He represents the sports clubs Mosvik IL and Strindheim IL. He is a younger brother of Petter Northug and Tomas Northug.

== Cross-country skiing results ==
All results are sourced from the International Ski Federation (FIS).

=== World Championships ===
Year	Age	15 km individual	30 km skiathlon	50 km mass start	Sprint	4 × 10 km relay	Team sprint
2023	27	—	—	—	7	—	—
2025	29	—	—	—	10	—	—

=== World Cup ===
==== Season standings ====
Season	Age	Discipline standings				Ski Tour standings				
Season	Age	Overall	Distance	Sprint	U23	Nordic Opening	Tour de Ski	Ski Tour 2020	World Cup Final	Ski Tour Canada
2015	19	NC	—	NC	NC	—	—	—N/a	—N/a	—N/a
2016	20	85	—	45	8	—	—	—N/a	—N/a	—
2018	22	54	—	21	6	—	—	—N/a	—	—N/a
2019	23	NC	—	NC	—N/a	—	—	—N/a	—	—N/a
2020	24	115	—	68	—N/a	—	—	—	—N/a	—N/a
2021	25	97	—	58	—N/a	—	—	—N/a	—N/a	—N/a
2022	26	24	NC	8	—N/a	—N/a	53	—N/a	—N/a	—N/a
2023	27	17	—	3rd place, bronze medalist(s)	—N/a	—N/a	—	—N/a	—N/a	—N/a
2024	28	26	—	6	—N/a	—N/a	—	—N/a	—N/a	—N/a
2025	29	21	NC	5	—N/a	—N/a	DNF	—N/a	—N/a	—N/a

==== Individual podiums ====
- 8 podiums – (7 WC, 1 SWC)

No.	Season	Date	Location	Race	Level	Place
1	2022–23	25 November 2022	Rukatunturi, Finland	1.4 km Sprint C	World Cup	2nd
2	2022–23	3 December 2022	Lillehammer, Norway	1.6 km Sprint F	World Cup	2nd
3	2022–23	21 March 2023	Tallinn, Estonia	1.4 km Sprint F	World Cup	3rd
4	2023–24	19 January 2024	Oberhof, Germany	1.3 km Sprint C	World Cup	3rd
5	2023–24	12 March 2024	Drammen, Norway	1.2 km Sprint C	World Cup	3rd
6	2024–25	7 December 2024	Lillehammer, Norway	1.3 km Sprint F	World Cup	2nd
7	2024–25	3 January 2025	Val di Fiemme, Italy	1.2 km Sprint C	Stage World Cup	2nd
8	2024–25	1 February 2025	Cogne, Italy	1.3 km Sprint C	World Cup	3rd

==== Team podiums ====
- 3 victory – (3 TS)
- 4 podiums – (4 TS)

No.	Season	Date	Location	Race	Level	Place	Teammate
1	2021–22	19 December 2021	Dresden, Germany	12 × 0.65 km Team Sprint F	World Cup	1st	Helland Larsen
2	2023–24	1 March 2024	Lahti, Finland	6 × 1.3 km Team Sprint C	World Cup	2nd	Taugbøl
3	2024–25	31 January 2025	Cogne, Italy	6 × 1.3 km Team Sprint C	World Cup	1st	Valnes
4	2024–25	22 March 2025	Lahti, Finland	6 × 1.5 km Team Sprint F	World Cup	1st	Klæbo
