= Johannes Høsflot Klæbo =

Norwegian cross-country skier (born 1996)

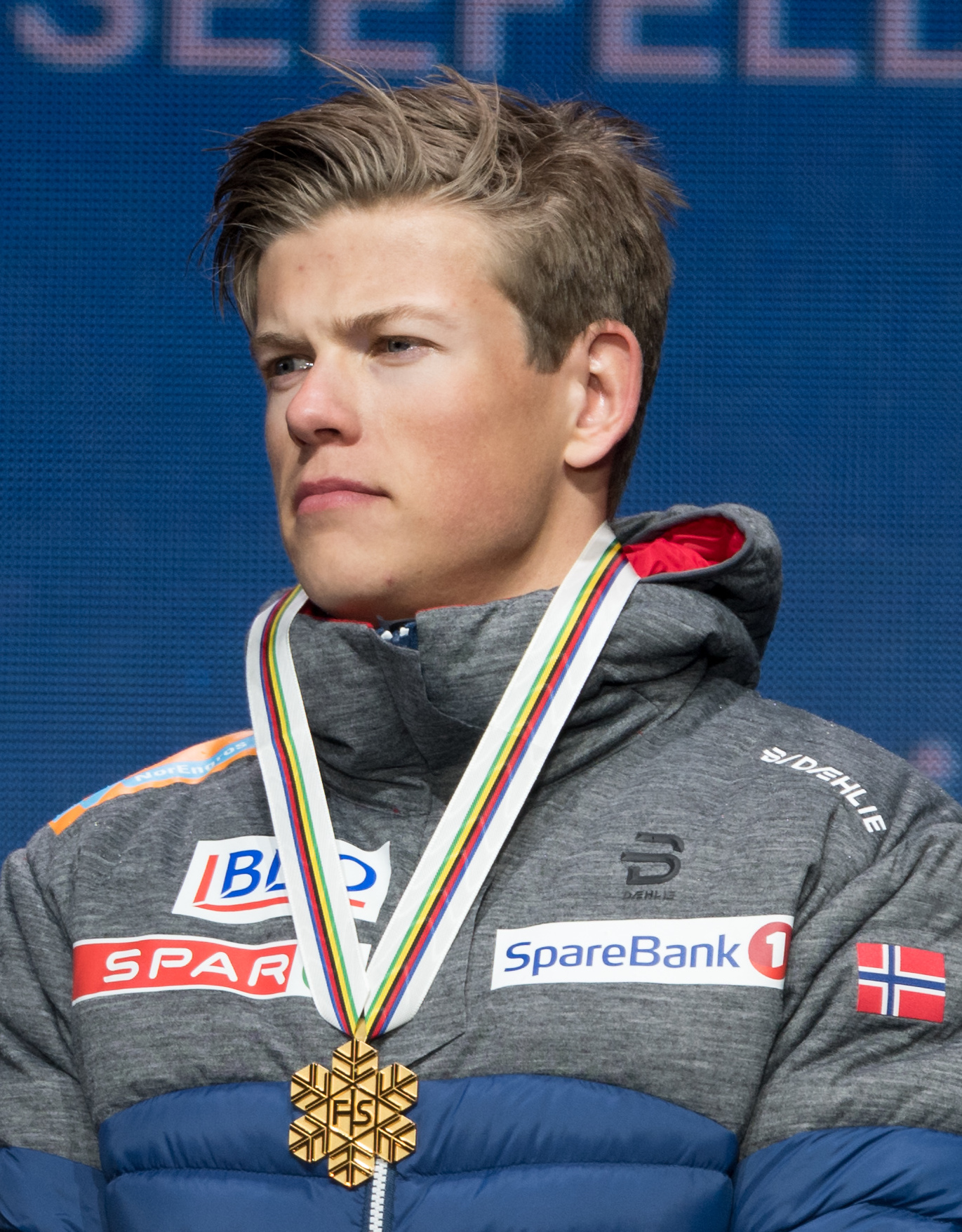
- Klæbo during a medal ceremony at the FIS Nordic World Ski Championships 2019

Personal information
- Nationality: Norway
- Born: 22 October 1996 (age 30) Oslo, Norway
- Height: 183.5 cm (6 ft 0 in)

Sport
- Sport: Skiing
- Club: Byåsen IL

World Cup career
- Seasons: 11 – (2016–present)
- Indiv. starts: 196
- Indiv. podiums: 142
- Indiv. wins: 113
- Team starts: 11
- Team podiums: 9
- Team wins: 9
- Overall titles: 6 – (2018, 2019, 2022, 2023, 2025, 2026)
- Discipline titles: 12 – (1 DI, 8 SP, 3 U23)
Medal record
Men's cross-country skiing
Representing Norway
International nordic ski competitions
Event	1st	2nd	3rd
Olympic Games	11	1	1
World Championships	15	2	1
Total	26	3	2
Olympic Games
Gold medal – first place	2018 Pyeongchang	Individual sprint
Gold medal – first place	2018 Pyeongchang	4 × 10 km relay
Gold medal – first place	2018 Pyeongchang	Team sprint
Gold medal – first place	2022 Beijing	Individual sprint
Gold medal – first place	2022 Beijing	Team sprint
Gold medal – first place	2026 Milano Cortina	10 km freestyle
Gold medal – first place	2026 Milano Cortina	20 km skiathlon
Gold medal – first place	2026 Milano Cortina	50 km classical
Gold medal – first place	2026 Milano Cortina	Individual sprint
Gold medal – first place	2026 Milano Cortina	4 × 7.5 km relay
Gold medal – first place	2026 Milano Cortina	Team sprint
Silver medal – second place	2022 Beijing	4 × 10 km relay
Bronze medal – third place	2022 Beijing	15 km classical
World Championships
Gold medal – first place	2019 Seefeld	Individual sprint
Gold medal – first place	2019 Seefeld	Team sprint
Gold medal – first place	2019 Seefeld	4 × 10 km relay
Gold medal – first place	2021 Oberstdorf	Individual sprint
Gold medal – first place	2021 Oberstdorf	Team sprint
Gold medal – first place	2021 Oberstdorf	4 × 10 km relay
Gold medal – first place	2023 Planica	Individual sprint
Gold medal – first place	2023 Planica	Team sprint
Gold medal – first place	2023 Planica	4 × 10 km relay
Gold medal – first place	2025 Trondheim	Individual sprint
Gold medal – first place	2025 Trondheim	20 km skiathlon
Gold medal – first place	2025 Trondheim	10 km classical
Gold medal – first place	2025 Trondheim	50 km freestyle
Gold medal – first place	2025 Trondheim	Team sprint
Gold medal – first place	2025 Trondheim	4 × 7.5 km relay
Silver medal – second place	2023 Planica	30 km skiathlon
Silver medal – second place	2023 Planica	50 km classical
Bronze medal – third place	2017 Lahti	Individual sprint
Junior World Championships
Gold medal – first place	2016 Râsnov	Individual sprint
Gold medal – first place	2016 Râsnov	10 km classical
Gold medal – first place	2016 Râsnov	4 × 5 km relay
Bronze medal – third place	2015 Almaty	Individual sprint
Bronze medal – third place	2015 Almaty	4 × 5 km relay
- Updated on 22 March 2026

Johannes Høsflot Klæbo (born 22 October 1996) is a Norwegian cross-country skier who represents Byåsen IL. He holds multiple records, among them for being the youngest skier in history to win the FIS Cross-Country World Cup, the Tour de Ski, a World Championship event, and an Olympic event in cross-country skiing.

During the 2019–20 World Cup season, Klæbo became the most successful male sprinter in World Cup history in terms of individual race victories and set a new record for the most overall sprint titles, with 4. He is currently the most successful male overall race winner in the competition's history.

Klæbo won three gold medals at the 2018 Winter Olympics, in his debut Olympic appearance. As of 2026, he is a 13-time Olympic medalist, with eleven gold. At the 2026 Winter Olympics, he broke the records for the most gold medals won at a single Winter Olympics and most career gold medals won by any Winter Olympic athlete, and now trails only swimmer Michael Phelps on the list of athletes with the most all-time Olympic gold medals.

== Career ==
=== 2015–16: World Cup debut ===
Klæbo made his debut in the World Cup in the 2015–16 season in the classic sprint in Drammen, Norway on 3 February 2016. He finished 15th in the race.

=== 2016–17: Breakthrough season ===
In the following 2016–17 season, Klæbo achieved his first World Cup podium after finishing third in the classic sprint in Ruka, Finland, on 26 November 2016. Later in the 2016–17 season, on 18 February 2017, Klæbo got his first World Cup victory when he won the sprint freestyle in Otepää, Estonia. He competed at the FIS Nordic World Ski Championships 2017 in Lahti, Finland, winning a bronze medal at the Men's sprint competition. On 17 March 2017 in Quebec City he won his first small crystal globe in the Sprint World Cup and also won the Helvetia U23 overall ranking after winning the end-of-season mini tour. He finished his second World Cup season with three victories.

=== 2017–18: Olympic success and World Cup overall ===
Klæbo participated in his first Olympics at the 2018 Winter Olympics in PyeongChang, South Korea. Before the Olympics, he had nine victories in the 2017–18 World Cup. He made his Olympic debut by finishing 10th in the men's skiathlon event. On 13 February 2018 he became an Olympic champion after winning the men's sprint. This victory made him the youngest ever male to win an Olympic event in cross-country skiing. He skied the last leg on the Norwegian teams that won both the 4 × 10-kilometre relay and the men's team sprint. A steep hill on the Olympic course was dubbed "Klæbo-bakken" ("Klæbo hill") by Norwegian media after Klæbo overtook his competitors several times in this climb throughout the games. With three gold medals, he tied with French biathlete Martin Fourcade for most gold medals won in the games.

Klæbo won the overall 2017–18 World Cup with a gap of 119 points down to Dario Cologna, making him the youngest ever winner of the World Cup. He also beat the record for the most sprint victories in a single World Cup season, with seven wins.

=== 2018–19: Tour de Ski, World Championships, and World Cup overall ===
Klæbo won the 2018–19 Tour de Ski in his first appearance in the Tour. 22 years and 76 days old, he became the youngest skier to win the overall Tour de Ski.

Klæbo won three gold medals at the 2019 World Championships in Seefeld in Tirol, Austria. He started the championships with a World Championship title in the individual sprint. By winning the sprint, Klæbo became the youngest male winner of a World Championship race in cross-country skiing. He finished 30th in the skiathlon after not keeping up at the classic part of the race. The result at the skiatlon made Klæbo give away his spot at the 15-kilometre classic to Sjur Røthe. Together with Emil Iversen, Klæbo won the team sprint after beating Russia's Alexander Bolshunov in the last stages of the final leg. On 1 March, Klæbo raced the 4th leg on Norway's team who won the 4 × 10-kilometre relay on the second-to-last event of the championships.

Klæbo won the overall 2018–19 World Cup and extended his own record of most sprint victories in a single World Cup season, with eight wins. He also leveled Emil Jönsson's all-time World Cup record of most sprint victories, with 16 wins, and tied with Emil Jönsson and Ola Vigen Hattestad for the most overall sprint titles, with 3.

=== 2019–20: Hand injury and fourth World Cup sprint title ===
After a shorter season as a result of the COVID-19 pandemic, as well as a hand injury resulting in a short absence from competing, Klæbo placed second overall in the 2019–20 World Cup. He also placed third in the 2019–20 Tour de Ski and achieved his best end-of-season ranking in the distance discipline, placing sixth. Klæbo also won his fourth overall sprint title, thereby setting the record for most overall sprint titles in history. He also overtook Emil Jönsson's all-time World Cup record of most individual sprint victories, extending his own record to 24.

In June 2020, Klæbo announced that he had signed a five-year contract with the Uno-X Pro Cycling Team, fitting in cycle training and racing around his skiing commitments.

=== 2020–21: Pandemic-disrupted World Cup and World Championship success ===
Klæbo enjoyed a strong start to the 2020–21 season at the Nordic Opening in Ruka, taking second in the opening sprint competition before winning the 15 km classic and clinching the Ruka Triple overall after the pursuit. However, the next World Cup stop on home snow in Lillehammer was cancelled due to the ongoing COVID-19 pandemic, and the race programme of Klæbo and his team-mates was further disrupted after the Norwegian, Swedish and Finnish teams elected not to compete in the subsequent World Cup rounds in December due to concerns regarding the risks of the pandemic and then also withdrew from the Tour de Ski after the three Nordic nations' request for the race to be shortened were refused by the International Ski Federation. Whilst the rest of the Norwegian team returned to the World Cup circuit at the first post-Tour meeting in Lahti, Klæbo elected to return at the next round in Falun at the end of January. In Falun he finished second in the 15 km classic mass start, being pipped in the final sprint by Bolshunov, before taking the win in the classic sprint.

At the World Championships in Oberstdorf, Klæbo started his campaign by successfully defending his title in the sprint, leading home team-mates Erik Valnes and Håvard Solås Taugbøl in a clean sweep of the podium positions for Norway, becoming the first man to win consecutive sprint world titles and the second skier overall, after fellow Norwegian Marit Bjørgen. He took his second gold medal of the championships in the team sprint alongside Valnes, overcoming a 4.3 second deficit going into the final lap of the race and attacking on the final climb to secure the win by 1.68 seconds. Klæbo secured another gold in the relay, where he took the anchor leg after team-mates Pål Golberg, Hans Christer Holund and Emil Iversen, holding off Bolshunov for the win. However, he missed out on a fourth title at the worlds when he was disqualified in the 50 km classic after being first to cross the finish line, as he was judged to have obstructed Bolshunov in the final sprint, handing the victory to team-mate Iversen. At the last meeting of the World Cup season in Engadin, Klæbo finished second in the 15 km behind Bolshunov and fourth in the 50 km freestyle pursuit. He finished third in the season's overall World Cup standings.

He was awarded the Holmenkollen Medal in 2022.

=== 2025–2026: Continued Olympic success and record-breaking achievements ===
Klaebo won the men's overall and sprint championships in the 2024–25 FIS Cross-Country World Cup. At the FIS Nordic World Ski Championships 2025, he became the first individual to win all six cross country skiing events at a single world championship competition. He was also the first to sweep all events since Yelena Välbe, who won all five cross country skiing events at the FIS Nordic World Ski Championships 1997. Klaebo's victories left him with a career total of 15 career World Championships gold medals, second only to Marit Bjørgen. During the 2025–26 FIS Cross-Country World Cup, Klaebo became the first male athlete to amass 100 World Cup victories, and the second athlete to do so after Bjørgen. He also won the 2025–26 Tour de Ski, becoming the first cross-country skier to win the Tour De Ski on five occasions.

Klæbo won his seventh Olympic gold medal on 10 February 2026, earning gold in the men's sprint as he finished in the final with a time of 3:39.74, having already won gold at the 2026 Milano Cortina Games in the men's 20km skiathlon. He then won his 8th Olympic gold medal on 13 February in the 10 km freestyle. On 15 February, he won his ninth Olympic gold medal as part of Norway's team in the men's 4 × 7.5 kilometre relay, breaking a record for the most gold medals won by a Winter Olympic athlete in history. On February 18, Klæbo won the 10th Olympic gold medal in the team sprint with teammate Einar Hedegart. Klæbo took his 11th Olympic gold medal on 21 February in the men's 50 km classical race.

Klaebo won the gold medal in all six men's cross-country skiing events at the 2026 Winter Olympics, thereby becoming the first athlete to win six gold medals at a single Winter Olympic Games. With a career total of 11 gold medals at the end of the 2026 Games, Klaebo holds more gold medals than any other Winter Olympian, and among all Olympians trails only swimmer Michael Phelps, who won 23 gold medals. Among Winter Olympians, Klaebo's 13 overall medals trails only biathlete Ole Einar Bjørndalen and Bjørgen, the latter of whom holds the record with 15 medals.

Returning to the 2025–26 World Cup competition following the Olympics, Klaebo clinched the World Cup overall season title for the sixth time, tying the record held by Bjorn Daehlie. He also won his eighth sprint title, adding to his own record for most sprint titles. With a win in the final race of the season, Klaebo won his first distance title, becoming the first male cross-country skier since Thomas Alsgaard in 1997–1998 to sweep the overall, sprint, and distance titles.

In the spring 2026 he was awarded the Marca Leyenda award given by the Spanish sports newspaper Marca to the best sport professionals in history.

== Cross-country skiing results ==
All results are sourced from the International Ski Federation (FIS).

=== Olympic Games ===
- 13 medals – (11 gold, 1 silver, 1 bronze)

Year	Age	10/15 km individual	20/30 km skiathlon	50 km mass start	Sprint	4 × 7.5/10 km relay	Team sprint
2018	21	—	10	—	Gold	Gold	Gold
2022	25	Bronze	40	DNF^{[a]}	Gold	Silver	Gold
2026	29	Gold	Gold	Gold	Gold	Gold	Gold

^{a} Distance reduced to 30 km due to weather conditions.

=== World Championships ===
- 18 medals – (15 gold, 2 silver, 1 bronze)

Year	Age	10/15 km individual	20/30 km skiathlon	50 km mass start	Sprint	4 × 7.5/10 km relay	Team sprint
2017	20	15	—	—	Bronze	—	4
2019	22	—	30	—	Gold	Gold	Gold
2021	24	—	4	DSQ	Gold	Gold	Gold
2023	26	4	Silver	Silver	Gold	Gold	Gold
2025	28	Gold	Gold	Gold	Gold	Gold	Gold

=== World Cup ===
==== Season titles ====
- 18 titles – (6 Overall, 1 Distance, 8 Sprint, 3 U23)

Season	Discipline
2017	Sprint
2017	U23
2018	Overall
2018	Sprint
2018	U23
2019	Overall
2019	Sprint
2019	U23
2020	Sprint
2022	Overall
2023	Overall
2023	Sprint
2024	Sprint
2025	Overall
2025	Sprint
2026	Overall
2026	Distance
2026	Sprint

==== Season standings ====
Season	Age	Discipline standings				Ski Tour standings			
Season	Age	Overall	Distance	Sprint	U23	Nordic Opening	Tour de Ski	Ski Tour 2020	World Cup Final
2016	19	110	—	68	12	—	—	—N/a	—N/a
2017	20	4	29	1st place, gold medalist(s)	1st place, gold medalist(s)	2nd place, silver medalist(s)	—	—N/a	1st place, gold medalist(s)
2018	21	1st place, gold medalist(s)	7	1st place, gold medalist(s)	1st place, gold medalist(s)	1st place, gold medalist(s)	—	—N/a	25
2019	22	1st place, gold medalist(s)	9	1st place, gold medalist(s)	1st place, gold medalist(s)	14	1st place, gold medalist(s)	—N/a	1st place, gold medalist(s)
2020	23	2nd place, silver medalist(s)	6	1st place, gold medalist(s)	—N/a	1st place, gold medalist(s)	3rd place, bronze medalist(s)	6	—N/a
2021	24	3rd place, bronze medalist(s)	8	8	—N/a	1st place, gold medalist(s)	—	—N/a	—N/a
2022	25	1st place, gold medalist(s)	3rd place, bronze medalist(s)	2nd place, silver medalist(s)	—N/a	—N/a	1st place, gold medalist(s)	—N/a	—N/a
2023	26	1st place, gold medalist(s)	2nd place, silver medalist(s)	1st place, gold medalist(s)	—N/a	—N/a	1st place, gold medalist(s)	—N/a	—N/a
2024	27	2nd place, silver medalist(s)	2nd place, silver medalist(s)	1st place, gold medalist(s)	—N/a	—N/a	—	—N/a	—N/a
2025	28	1st place, gold medalist(s)	6	1st place, gold medalist(s)	—N/a	—N/a	1st place, gold medalist(s)	—N/a	—N/a
2026	29	1st place, gold medalist(s)	1st place, gold medalist(s)	1st place, gold medalist(s)	—N/a	—N/a	1st place, gold medalist(s)	—N/a	—N/a

==== Individual podiums ====
- 113 wins – (79 WC, 34 SWC)
- 142 podiums – (102 WC, 40 SWC)

No.	Season	Date	Location	Race	Level	Place
1	2016–17	26 November 2016	Rukatunturi, Finland	1.4 km Sprint C	World Cup	3rd
2	2016–17	2–4 December 2016	(Norway) Nordic Opening	Overall Standings	World Cup	2nd
3	2016–17	14 January 2017	Toblach, Italy	1.2 km Sprint F	World Cup	3rd
4	2016–17	18 February 2017	Otepää, Estonia	1.4 km Sprint F	World Cup	1st
5	2016–17	8 March 2017	Drammen, Norway	1.2 km Sprint C	World Cup	2nd
6	2016–17	18 March 2017	Quebec City, Canada	15 km Mass Start C	Stage World Cup	1st
7	2016–17	17–19 March 2017	(Canada) World Cup Final	Overall Standings	World Cup	1st
8	2017–18	24 November 2017	Rukatunturi, Finland	1.4 km Sprint C	Stage World Cup	1st
9	2017–18	25 November 2017	Rukatunturi, Finland	15 km Individual C	Stage World Cup	1st
10	2017–18	24–26 November 2017	(Finland) Nordic Opening	Overall Standings	World Cup	1st
11	2017–18	2 December 2017	Lillehammer, Norway	1.5 km Sprint C	World Cup	1st
12	2017–18	3 December 2017	Lillehammer, Norway	15 km + 15 km Skiathlon C/F	World Cup	1st
13	2017–18	9 December 2017	Davos, Switzerland	1.5 km Sprint F	World Cup	1st
14	2017–18	17 December 2017	Toblach, Italy	15 km Pursuit C	World Cup	1st
15	2017–18	13 January 2018	Dresden, Germany	1.2 km Sprint F	World Cup	2nd
16	2017–18	20 January 2018	Planica, Slovenia	1.6 km Sprint C	World Cup	1st
17	2017–18	21 January 2018	Planica, Slovenia	15 km Individual C	World Cup	2nd
18	2017–18	27 January 2018	Seefeld, Austria	1.4 km Sprint F	World Cup	1st
19	2017–18	3 March 2018	Lahti, Finland	1.6 km Sprint F	World Cup	3rd
20	2017–18	7 March 2018	Drammen, Norway	1.2 km Sprint C	World Cup	1st
21	2017–18	16 March 2018	Falun, Sweden	1.4 km Sprint F	Stage World Cup	1st
22	2018–19	24 November 2018	Rukatunturi, Finland	1.4 km Sprint C	World Cup	2nd
23	2018–19	15 December 2018	Davos, Switzerland	1.5 km Sprint F	World Cup	1st
24	2018–19	29 December 2018	Toblach, Italy	1.3 km Sprint F	Stage World Cup	1st
25	2018–19	1 January 2019	Val Müstair, Switzerland	1.4 km Sprint F	Stage World Cup	1st
26	2018–19	3 January 2019	Oberstdorf, Germany	15 km Pursuit F	Stage World Cup	1st
27	2018–19	5 January 2019	Val di Fiemme, Italy	15 km Mass Start C	Stage World Cup	1st
28	2018–19	29 December 2018 – 6 January 2019	(Italy) (Switzerland) (Germany) (Italy) Tour de Ski	Overall Standings	World Cup	1st
29	2018–19	19 January 2019	Otepää, Estonia	1.6 km Sprint C	World Cup	1st
30	2018–19	9 February 2019	Lahti, Finland	1.6 km Sprint F	World Cup	1st
31	2018–19	12 March 2019	Drammen, Norway	1.2 km Sprint C	World Cup	1st
32	2018–19	16 March 2019	Falun, Sweden	1.4 km Sprint F	World Cup	1st
33	2018–19	22 March 2019	Quebec City, Canada	1.6 km Sprint F	Stage World Cup	1st
34	2018–19	23 March 2019	Quebec City, Canada	15 km Mass Start C	Stage World Cup	1st
35	2018–19	22–24 March 2019	(Canada) World Cup Final	Overall Standings	World Cup	1st
36	2019–20	29 November 2019	Rukatunturi, Finland	1.4 km Sprint C	Stage World Cup	1st
37	2019–20	30 November 2019	Rukatunturi, Finland	15 km Individual C	Stage World Cup	2nd
38	2019–20	29 November – 1 December 2019	(Finland) Nordic Opening	Overall Standings	World Cup	1st
39	2019–20	14 December 2019	Davos, Switzerland	1.5 km Sprint F	World Cup	1st
40	2019–20	28 December 2019	Lenzerheide, Switzerland	15 km Mass Start F	Stage World Cup	2nd
41	2019–20	29 December 2019	Lenzerheide, Switzerland	1.5 km Sprint F	Stage World Cup	1st
42	2019–20	3 January 2020	Val di Fiemme, Italy	15 km Mass Start C	Stage World Cup	1st
43	2019–20	4 January 2020	Val di Fiemme, Italy	1.5 km Sprint C	Stage World Cup	1st
44	2019–20	28 December 2019 – 5 January 2020	(Switzerland) (Italy) Tour de Ski	Overall Standings	World Cup	3rd
45	2019–20	19 January 2020	Nové Město, Czech Republic	15 km Pursuit C	World Cup	2nd
46	2019–20	26 January 2020	Oberstdorf, Germany	1.6 km Sprint C	World Cup	1st
47	2019–20	18 February 2020	Åre, Sweden	0.7 km Sprint F	Stage World Cup	1st
48	2019–20	20 February 2020	Meråker, Norway	34 km Mass Start F	Stage World Cup	2nd
49	2019–20	22 February 2020	Trondheim, Norway	1.5 km Sprint C	Stage World Cup	1st
50	2019–20	4 March 2020	Konnerud, Norway	1.5 km Sprint F	World Cup	1st
51	2020–21	27 November 2020	Rukatunturi, Finland	1.4 km Sprint C	Stage World Cup	2nd
52	2020–21	28 November 2020	Rukatunturi, Finland	15 km Individual C	Stage World Cup	1st
53	2020–21	27–29 November 2020	(Finland) Nordic Opening	Overall Standings	World Cup	1st
54	2020–21	30 January 2021	Falun, Sweden	15 km Mass Start C	World Cup	2nd
55	2020–21	31 January 2021	Falun, Sweden	1.4 km Sprint C	World Cup	1st
56	2020–21	13 March 2021	Engadin, Switzerland	15 km Mass Start C	World Cup	2nd
57	2021–22	26 November 2021	Rukatunturi, Finland	1.4 km Sprint C	World Cup	2nd
58	2021–22	3 December 2021	Lillehammer, Norway	1.6 km Sprint F	World Cup	1st
59	2021–22	11 December 2021	Davos, Switzerland	1.5 km Sprint F	World Cup	1st
60	2021–22	12 December 2021	Davos, Switzerland	15 km Individual F	World Cup	2nd
61	2021–22	28 December 2021	Lenzerheide, Switzerland	1.5 km Sprint F	Stage World Cup	1st
62	2021–22	31 December 2021	Oberstdorf, Germany	15 km Mass Start F	Stage World Cup	1st
63	2021–22	1 January 2022	Oberstdorf, Germany	1.5 km Sprint C	Stage World Cup	1st
64	2021–22	3 January 2022	Val di Fiemme, Italy	15 km Mass Start C	Stage World Cup	1st
65	2021–22	28 December 2021 – 4 January 2022	(Switzerland) (Germany) (Italy) Tour de Ski	Overall Standings	World Cup	1st
66	2021–22	26 February 2022	Lahti, Finland	1.6 km Sprint F	World Cup	1st
67	2021–22	27 February 2022	Lahti, Finland	15 km Individual C	World Cup	2nd
68	2022–23	25 November 2022	Rukatunturi, Finland	1.4 km Sprint C	World Cup	1st
69	2022–23	26 November 2022	Rukatunturi, Finland	10 km Individual C	World Cup	1st
70	2022–23	27 November 2022	Rukatunturi, Finland	20 km Pursuit F	World Cup	1st
71	2022–23	3 December 2022	Lillehammer, Norway	1.6 km Sprint F	World Cup	1st
72	2022–23	17 December 2022	Davos, Switzerland	1.5 km Sprint F	World Cup	2nd
73	2022–23	31 December 2022	Val Müstair, Switzerland	1.5 km Sprint F	Stage World Cup	1st
74	2022–23	1 January 2023	Val Müstair, Switzerland	10 km Pursuit C	Stage World Cup	1st
75	2022–23	3 January 2023	Oberstdorf, Germany	10 km Individual C	Stage World Cup	1st
76	2022–23	4 January 2023	Oberstdorf, Germany	20 km Pursuit F	Stage World Cup	1st
77	2022–23	6 January 2023	Val di Fiemme, Italy	1.3 km Sprint C	Stage World Cup	1st
78	2022–23	7 January 2023	Val di Fiemme, Italy	15 km Mass Start C	Stage World Cup	1st
79	2022–23	31 December 2022 – 8 January 2023	(Switzerland) (Germany) (Italy) Tour de Ski	Overall Standings	World Cup	1st
80	2022–23	21 January 2023	Livigno, Italy	1.2 km Sprint F	World Cup	1st
81	2022–23	28 January 2023	Les Rousses, France	1.3 km Sprint C	World Cup	2nd
82	2022–23	29 January 2023	Les Rousses, France	20 km Mass Start C	World Cup	1st
83	2022–23	3 February 2023	Toblach, Italy	1.4 km Sprint F	World Cup	1st
84	2022–23	4 February 2023	Toblach, Italy	10 km Individual F	World Cup	3rd
85	2022–23	14 March 2023	Drammen, Norway	1.2 km Sprint C	World Cup	1st
86	2022–23	17 March 2023	Falun, Sweden	10 km Individual C	World Cup	1st
87	2022–23	18 March 2023	Falun, Sweden	1.4 km Sprint F	World Cup	1st
88	2022–23	21 March 2023	Tallinn, Estonia	1.4 km Sprint F	World Cup	1st
89	2022–23	25 March 2023	Lahti, Finland	1.4 km Sprint C	World Cup	1st
90	2022–23	26 March 2023	Lahti, Finland	20 km Mass Start C	World Cup	1st
91	2023–24	24 November 2023	Rukatunturi, Finland	1.4 km Sprint C	World Cup	3rd
92	2023–24	9 December 2023	Östersund, Sweden	1.4 km Sprint C	World Cup	1st
93	2023–24	15 December 2023	Trondheim, Norway	1.4 km Sprint F	World Cup	1st
94	2023–24	16 December 2023	Trondheim, Norway	10 km + 10 km Skiathlon C/F	World Cup	1st
95	2023–24	17 December 2023	Trondheim, Norway	10 km Individual C	World Cup	1st
96	2023–24	27 January 2024	Goms, Switzerland	1.5 km Sprint F	World Cup	1st
97	2023–24	28 January 2024	Goms, Switzerland	20 km Mass Start F	World Cup	1st
98	2023–24	10 February 2024	Canmore, Canada	1.3 km Sprint F	World Cup	1st
99	2023–24	11 February 2024	Canmore, Canada	20 km Mass Start C	World Cup	2nd
100	2023–24	13 February 2024	Canmore, Canada	1.3 km Sprint C	World Cup	1st
101	2023–24	17 February 2024	(United States) Minneapolis, USA - Stifel Loppet Cup	1.5 km Sprint F	World Cup	1st
102	2023–24	2 March 2024	Lahti, Finland	20 km Individual C	World Cup	1st
103	2023–24	3 March 2024	Lahti, Finland	1.5 km Sprint F	World Cup	1st
104	2023–24	10 March 2024	Oslo, Norway	50 km Mass Start C	World Cup	1st
105	2023–24	12 March 2024	Drammen, Norway	1.2 km Sprint C	World Cup	1st
106	2023–24	15 March 2024	Falun, Sweden	1.4 km Sprint C	World Cup	1st
107	2023–24	16 March 2024	Falun, Sweden	10 km Individual C	World Cup	1st
108	2023–24	17 March 2024	Falun, Sweden	20 km Mass Start F	World Cup	1st
109	2024–25	30 November 2024	Rukatunturi, Finland	1.4 km Sprint C	World Cup	1st
110	2024–25	7 December 2024	Lillehammer, Norway	1.3 km Sprint F	World Cup	1st
111	2024–25	14 December 2024	Davos, Switzerland	1.5 km Sprint F	World Cup	1st
112	2024–25	28 December 2024	Toblach, Italy	1.4 km Sprint F	Stage World Cup	1st
113	2024–25	29 December 2024	Toblach, Italy	15 km Mass Start C	Stage World Cup	1st
114	2024–25	1 January 2025	Toblach, Italy	15 km Pursuit C	Stage World Cup	3rd
115	2024–25	3 January 2025	Val di Fiemme, Italy	1.2 km Sprint C	Stage World Cup	1st
116	2024–25	4 January 2025	Val di Fiemme, Italy	10 km + 10 km Skiathlon C/F	Stage World Cup	1st
117	2024–25	28 December 2024 – 5 January 2025	(Italy) Tour de Ski	Overall Standings	World Cup	1st
118	2024–25	25 January 2025	Engadin, Switzerland	1.3 km Sprint F	World Cup	1st
119	2024–25	26 January 2025	Engadin, Switzerland	20 km Mass Start F	World Cup	1st
120	2024–25	14 February 2025	Falun, Sweden	1.4 km Sprint C	World Cup	1st
121	2024–25	15 February 2025	Falun, Sweden	10 km Individual C	World Cup	2nd
122	2024–25	16 March 2025	Oslo, Norway	10 km Individual F	World Cup	3rd
123	2024–25	19 March 2025	Tallinn, Estonia	1.4 km Sprint F	World Cup	1st
124	2024–25	21 March 2025	Lahti, Finland	1.5 km Sprint F	World Cup	1st
125	2024–25	23 March 2025	Lahti, Finland	50 km Mass Start C	World Cup	1st
126	2025–26	28 November 2025	Rukatunturi, Finland	10 km Individual C	World Cup	2nd
127	2025–26	29 November 2025	Rukatunturi, Finland	1.4 km Sprint C	World Cup	1st
128	2025–26	5 December 2025	Trondheim, Norway	1.4 km Sprint C	World Cup	1st
129	2025–26	6 December 2025	Trondheim, Norway	10 km + 10 km Skiathlon C/F	World Cup	1st
130	2025–26	28 December 2025	Toblach, Italy	1.4 km Sprint F	Stage World Cup	1st
131	2025–26	29 December 2025	Toblach, Italy	10 km Individual C	Stage World Cup	2nd
132	2025–26	1 January 2026	Toblach, Italy	20 km Pursuit C	Stage World Cup	1st
133	2025–26	3 January 2026	Val di Fiemme, Italy	1.5 km Sprint C	Stage World Cup	1st
134	2025–26	28 December 2025 – 4 January 2026	(Italy) Tour de Ski	Overall Standings	World Cup	1st
135	2025–26	24 January 2026	Goms, Switzerland	1.5 km Sprint C	World Cup	1st
136	2025–26	25 January 2026	Goms, Switzerland	20 km Mass Start C	World Cup	1st
137	2025–26	28 February 2026	Falun, Sweden	1.4 km Sprint F	World Cup	1st
138	2025–26	1 March 2026	Falun, Sweden	10 km + 10 km Skiathlon C/F	World Cup	1st
139	2025–26	7 March 2026	Lahti, Finland	1.5 km Sprint F	World Cup	1st
140	2025–26	8 March 2026	Lahti, Finland	10 km Individual C	World Cup	1st
141	2025–26	20 March 2026	(United States) Lake Placid, USA	10 km Individual C	World Cup	1st
142	2025–26	22 March 2026	(United States) Lake Placid, USA	20 km Mass Start F	World Cup	1st

==== Team podiums ====
- 9 wins – (3 RL, 6 TS)
- 9 podiums – (3 RL, 6 TS)

No.	Season	Date	Location	Race	Level	Place	Teammate(s)
1	2018–19	10 February 2019	Lahti, Finland	6 × 1.6 km Team Sprint C	World Cup	1st	Iversen
2	2019–20	1 March 2020	Lahti, Finland	4 × 7.5 km Relay C/F	World Cup	1st	Golberg / Holund / Røthe
3	2021–22	5 December 2021	Lillehammer, Norway	4 × 7.5 km Relay C/F	World Cup	1st	Valnes / Iversen / Krüger
4	2022–23	24 March 2023	Lahti, Finland	6 × 1.4 km Team Sprint F	World Cup	1st	Valnes
5	2023–24	21 January 2024	Oberhof, Germany	4 × 7.5 km Relay C/F	World Cup	1st	Nyenget / Valnes / Golberg
6	2023–24	1 March 2024	Lahti, Finland	6 × 1.3 km Team Sprint C	World Cup	1st	Golberg
7	2024–25	13 December 2024	Davos, Switzerland	6 × 1.5 km Team Sprint F	World Cup	1st	Golberg
8	2024–25	22 March 2025	Lahti, Finland	6 × 1.5 km Team Sprint F	World Cup	1st	Northug
9	2025–26	12 December 2025	Davos, Switzerland	6 × 1.2 km Team Sprint F	World Cup	1st	Valnes

== Personal life ==
Klæbo was born in Oslo, the capital of Norway. He lived there until he was five years old before he and his family moved to Trondheim. He grew up there and still lives there today. Klæbo is very close to his family and spends a lot of time with them. His father, Haakon Klæbo, is his manager and his grandfather, Kåre Høsflot, is his coach.

Outside sports, Klæbo and his younger brother, Ola, run a YouTube channel where they upload weekly vlogs about Klæbo's everyday life as an athlete. He started his channel because he wanted people to see what cross-country skiers do outside competitions and off-season. His siblings help him out by editing and translating the videos. As of October 2019, Klæbo has over 102,000 subscribers on his YouTube channel and totals over 12 million views from over 100 videos.

He was a part of Norway's elite sprint team until mid-2019, when he became a part of Norway's men's elite allround team. He switched back to the elite sprint team before the 2020–21 FIS Cross-Country World Cup season.

In March 2019, Klæbo was sentenced to 16 days of non-custodial prison and was fined 10,000 Norwegian kroner for causing a collision on 12 December 2018 that injured a twelve-year-old girl. He allegedly failed to notice that a car had stopped at a pedestrian crossing, then drove into the car, which in turn hit the girl. He was also disqualified from skiing for nine months.
