= 2024–25 FIS Cross-Country World Cup =

Cross-country skiing competition

Discipline	Men	Women
Overall	(Norway) Johannes Høsflot Klæbo (5)	(United States) Jessie Diggins (3)
Distance	(Norway) Simen Hegstad Krüger (1)	(United States) Jessie Diggins (3)
Sprint	(Norway) Johannes Høsflot Klæbo (7)	(Finland) Jasmi Joensuu (1)
U23	(Sweden) Edvin Anger (2)	(Germany) Helen Hoffmann (1)
Bonus ranking	(Norway) Johannes Høsflot Klæbo (5)	(Norway) Therese Johaug (2)
Nations Cup	Norway (36)	Norway (25)
- Nations Cup overall: Norway (36)

Stage events
Tour de Ski	(Norway) Johannes Høsflot Klæbo (4)	(Norway) Therese Johaug (4)

Competition
Edition	44th	44th
Locations	12	12
Individual	30	30
Relay/Team	3	3
Mixed	1	1

The 2024–25 FIS Cross-Country World Cup, organized by the International Ski Federation (FIS) was the 44th World Cup for men and women as the highest level of international cross-country skiing competitions.

The men's and women's season started on 29 November 2024 in Ruka, Finland and concluded on 23 March 2025 in Lahti, Finland.

The season took a break in February and March due to the FIS Nordic World Ski Championships 2025 in Trondheim, Norway.

Harald Østberg Amundsen from Norway and Jessie Diggins from the United States were the reigning champions from the previous season. Amundensen did not defend his title, finishing the season in 5th place.

Johannes Høsflot Klæbo from Norway claimed the Crystal Globe for the fifth time, while Diggins successfully defended her title, securing her third World Cup title.

== Season overview ==
The proposed World Cup schedule for the 2024–25 season was approved at a meeting in Portorož on 8 May.

For the first time since the 2012/13 season, the opening event did not feature a sprint competition. For the first time in 40 years, Lahti hosted the traditional 50 km World Cup race. This race won't take place in Holmenkollen, in order to avoid overloading the athletes during the next two 50 km races after the World Championships.

The competition in Nové Město was removed from the calendar and instead, the World Cup weekend took place in Cogne.

== Map of world cup hosts ==
Europe

Location of all 12 World Cup hosts of the season.

== Men ==
=== Calendar ===
Key: C – Classic / F – Freestyle; MSS – Mass Start / PUR – Pursuit
No.	WC	Date	Place	Discipline	Winner	Second	Third	R.
1		29 November 2024	(Finland) Ruka	10 km C	(Finland) Iivo Niskanen	(Norway) Harald Østberg Amundsen	(Norway) Martin Løwstrøm Nyenget	
2		30 November 2024	(Finland) Ruka	Sprint C	(Norway) Johannes Høsflot Klæbo	(Norway) Erik Valnes	(Finland) Lauri Vuorinen	
3		1 December 2024	(Finland) Ruka	20 km F MSS	(Norway) Harald Østberg Amundsen	(Norway) Jan Thomas Jenssen	(Norway) Martin Løwstrøm Nyenget	
4		6 December 2024	(Norway) Lillehammer	10 km F	(Norway) Martin Løwstrøm Nyenget	(Norway) Simen Hegstad Krüger	(Norway) Harald Østberg Amundsen	
5		7 December 2024	(Norway) Lillehammer	Sprint F	(Norway) Johannes Høsflot Klæbo	(Norway) Even Northug	(Italy) Federico Pellegrino	
6		8 December 2024	(Norway) Lillehammer	20 km skiathlon	(Norway) Harald Østberg Amundsen	(Norway) Jan Thomas Jenssen	(Norway) Martin Løwstrøm Nyenget	
7		14 December 2024	(Switzerland) Davos	Sprint F	(Norway) Johannes Høsflot Klæbo	(France) Lucas Chanavat	(Norway) Erik Valnes	
8		15 December 2024	(Switzerland) Davos	20 km C	(Norway) Martin Løwstrøm Nyenget	(Finland) Iivo Niskanen	(France) Hugo Lapalus	
TdS	9	28 December 2024	(Italy) Toblach	Sprint F	(Norway) Johannes Høsflot Klæbo	(France) Lucas Chanavat	(Switzerland) Janik Riebli	
TdS	10	29 December 2024	(Italy) Toblach	15 km C MSS	(Norway) Johannes Høsflot Klæbo	(Norway) Erik Valnes	(Norway) Håvard Moseby	
TdS	11	31 December 2024	(Italy) Toblach	20 km F	(Norway) Harald Østberg Amundsen	(Norway) Simen Hegstad Krüger	(United Kingdom) Andrew Musgrave	
TdS	12	1 January 2025	(Italy) Toblach	15 km C PUR	(Norway) Harald Østberg Amundsen	(Sweden) Edvin Anger	(Norway) Johannes Høsflot Klæbo	
TdS	13	3 January 2025	(Italy) Val di Fiemme	Sprint C	(Norway) Johannes Høsflot Klæbo	(Norway) Even Northug	(Sweden) Marcus Grate	
TdS	14	4 January 2025	(Italy) Val di Fiemme	20 km skiathlon	(Norway) Johannes Høsflot Klæbo	(Italy) Federico Pellegrino	(Norway) Jan Thomas Jenssen	
TdS	15	5 January 2025	(Italy) Val di Fiemme	10 km F MSS Climb	(Norway) Simen Hegstad Krüger	(Austria) Mika Vermeulen	(Germany) Friedrich Moch	
9	19th Tour de Ski Overall (28 December 2024 – 5 January 2025)				(Norway) Johannes Høsflot Klæbo	(Austria) Mika Vermeulen	(France) Hugo Lapalus	
10	16	17 January 2025	(France) Les Rousses	10 km F	(Norway) Iver Tildheim Andersen	(Norway) Pål Golberg	(United States) Ben Ogden	
11	17	18 January 2025	(France) Les Rousses	Sprint C	(Sweden) Edvin Anger	(Norway) Ansgar Evensen	(Norway) Erik Valnes	
12	18	19 January 2025	(France) Les Rousses	20 km C MSS	(Sweden) William Poromaa	(Finland) Iivo Niskanen	(Norway) Simen Hegstad Krüger	
13	19	25 January 2025	(Switzerland) Engadin	Sprint F	(Norway) Johannes Høsflot Klæbo	(Sweden) Edvin Anger	(France) Lucas Chanavat	
14	20	26 January 2025	(Switzerland) Engadin	20 km F MSS	(Norway) Johannes Høsflot Klæbo	(Norway) Iver Tildheim Andersen	(Norway) Didrik Tønseth	
15	21	1 February 2025	(Italy) Cogne	Sprint C	(Norway) Erik Valnes	(Norway) Ansgar Evensen	(Norway) Even Northug	
16	22	2 February 2025	(Italy) Cogne	10 km F	(Norway) Harald Østberg Amundsen	(Norway) Iver Tildheim Andersen	(Norway) Martin Løwstrøm Nyenget	
17	23	14 February 2025	(Sweden) Falun	Sprint C	(Norway) Johannes Høsflot Klæbo	(Norway) Erik Valnes	(Norway) Oskar Opstad Vike	
18	24	15 February 2025	(Sweden) Falun	10 km C	(Finland) Iivo Niskanen	(Norway) Johannes Høsflot Klæbo	(Norway) Erik Valnes	
19	25	16 February 2025	(Sweden) Falun	20 km F MSS	(Norway) Pål Golberg	(United States) Gus Schumacher	(Norway) Harald Østberg Amundsen	
FIS Nordic World Ski Championships 2025 (26 February – 8 March • Trondheim, Norway)
20	26	15 March 2025	(Norway) Oslo	20 km C	(Norway) Martin Løwstrøm Nyenget	(Sweden) William Poromaa	(Norway) Simen Hegstad Krüger	
21	27	16 March 2025	(Norway) Oslo	10 km F	(Norway) Harald Østberg Amundsen	(Norway) Einar Hedegart	(Norway) Johannes Høsflot Klæbo	
22	28	19 March 2025	(Estonia) Tallinn	Sprint F	(Norway) Johannes Høsflot Klæbo	(Norway) Harald Østberg Amundsen (France) Jules Chappaz	N/A	
23	29	21 March 2025	(Finland) Lahti	Sprint F	(Norway) Johannes Høsflot Klæbo	(France) Jules Chappaz	(Italy) Federico Pellegrino	
24	30	23 March 2025	(Finland) Lahti	50 km C MSS	(Norway) Johannes Høsflot Klæbo	(Norway) Martin Løwstrøm Nyenget	(Norway) Simen Hegstad Krüger	
44th FIS World Cup Overall (29 November 2024 – 23 March 2025)					(Norway) Johannes Høsflot Klæbo	(Sweden) Edvin Anger	(Norway) Erik Valnes	

=== Overall leaders ===
Holder (Note: The leading position in the World Cup belongs to the competitor who has accumulated the most points in the general classification of the series in the competitions held so far. In the event of an equal number of points, the World Cup leader is the competitor who has won more competitions.)	Date	Place(s)	Number of competitions
(Finland) Iivo Niskanen	31 November 2024	(Finland) Ruka	1
(Norway) Johannes Høsflot Klæbo (1)	30 November 2024	(Finland) Ruka	1
(Norway) Harald Østberg Amundsen	1 December 2024 – 1 January 2025	(Finland) Ruka – (Italy) Toblach	10
(Norway) Johannes Høsflot Klæbo (2)	3 January 2025 – 23 March 2025	(Italy) Val di Fiemme – (Finland) Lahti	19

=== Standings ===
==== Overall ====
Rank	final standings after 31 events	Points
1	(Norway) Johannes Høsflot Klæbo	2200
2	(Sweden) Edvin Anger	1731
3	(Norway) Erik Valnes	1530
4	(Italy) Federico Pellegrino	1510
5	(Norway) Harald Østberg Amundsen	1439
6	(Norway) Simen Hegstad Krüger	1431
7	(France) Hugo Lapalus	1388
8	(Norway) Andreas Fjorden Ree	1235
9	(Norway) Martin Løwstrøm Nyenget	1154
10	(United States) Ben Ogden	1087

==== Distance ====
Rank	final standings after 19 events	Points
1	(Norway) Simen Hegstad Krüger	1317
2	(Norway) Martin Løwstrøm Nyenget	1154
3	(France) Hugo Lapalus	1118
4	(Norway) Harald Østberg Amundsen	1079
5	(Norway) Andreas Fjorden Ree	1055
6	(Norway) Johannes Høsflot Klæbo	973
7	(Finland) Iivo Niskanen	924
8	(Norway) Pål Golberg	870
9	(Austria) Mika Vermeulen	789
10	(Sweden) William Poromaa	784

==== Sprint ====
Rank	final standings after 11 events	Points
1	(Norway) Johannes Høsflot Klæbo	927
2	(Norway) Erik Valnes	828
3	(Sweden) Edvin Anger	784
4	(France) Lucas Chanavat	731
5	(Norway) Even Northug	699
6	(Italy) Federico Pellegrino	694
7	(United States) Ben Ogden	544
8	(Finland) Lauri Vuorinen	525
9	(Switzerland) Valerio Grond	439
10	(Switzerland) Janik Riebli	431

==== U23 ====
Rank	final standings after 31 events	Points
1	(Sweden) Edvin Anger	1731
2	(France) Mathis Desloges	986
3	(Norway) Oskar Opstad Vike	431
4	(Italy) Elia Barp	409
5	(Italy) Martino Carollo	321
6	(United States) Jack Young	210
7	(Sweden) Måns Skoglund	191
8	(Czech Republic) Jiří Tuž	181
9	(Norway) Aleksander Elde Holmboe	170
10	(Finland) Niko Anttola	159

==== Bonus ranking ====
Rank	final standings after 12 events	Points
1	(Norway) Johannes Høsflot Klæbo	217
2	(Norway) Simen Hegstad Krüger	183
3	(Norway) Martin Løwstrøm Nyenget	136
4	(France) Hugo Lapalus	127
5	(Austria) Mika Vermeulen	118
6	(Norway) Andreas Fjorden Ree	112
7	(Norway) Harald Østberg Amundsen	105
8	(Germany) Friedrich Moch	102
9	(Sweden) William Poromaa	88
10	(Italy) Federico Pellegrino	79

==== Prize money ====
Rank	final standings after 39 payouts	CHF
1	(Norway) Johannes Høsflot Klæbo	339 200
2	(Norway) Erik Valnes	126 100
3	(Norway) Harald Østberg Amundsen	125 200
4	(Sweden) Edvin Anger	124 850
5	(Norway) Martin Løwstrøm Nyenget	87 500
6	(Italy) Federico Pellegrino	82 700
7	(France) Hugo Lapalus	80 200
8	(Austria) Mika Vermeulen	79 750
9	(Norway) Simen Hegstad Krüger	72 950
10	(Finland) Iivo Niskanen	62 850

== Women ==
=== Calendar ===
Key: C – Classic / F – Freestyle; MSS – Mass Start / PUR – Pursuit
No.	WC	Date	Place	Discipline	Winner	Second	Third	R.
1		29 November 2024	(Finland) Ruka	10 km C	(Sweden) Frida Karlsson	(Norway) Therese Johaug	(Norway) Astrid Øyre Slind	
2		30 November 2024	(Finland) Ruka	Sprint C	(Sweden) Johanna Hagström	(Norway) Julie Myhre	(Sweden) Maja Dahlqvist	
3		1 December 2024	(Finland) Ruka	20 km F MSS	(United States) Jessie Diggins	(Sweden) Jonna Sundling	(Norway) Heidi Weng	
4		6 December 2024	(Norway) Lillehammer	10 km F	(Norway) Therese Johaug	(Norway) Heidi Weng	(Norway) Astrid Øyre Slind	
5		7 December 2024	(Norway) Lillehammer	Sprint F	(Sweden) Jonna Sundling	(Sweden) Johanna Hagström	(Norway) Julie Myhre	
6		8 December 2024	(Norway) Lillehammer	20 km skiathlon	(Norway) Therese Johaug	(Norway) Heidi Weng	(United States) Jessie Diggins	
7		14 December 2024	(Switzerland) Davos	Sprint F	(Sweden) Jonna Sundling	(Norway) Mathilde Myhrvold	(Norway) Julie Myhre	
8		15 December 2024	(Switzerland) Davos	20 km C	(Norway) Astrid Øyre Slind	(Finland) Kerttu Niskanen	(Norway) Therese Johaug	
TdS	9	28 December 2024	(Italy) Toblach	Sprint F	(United States) Jessie Diggins	(Finland) Jasmi Joensuu	(Switzerland) Nadine Fähndrich	
TdS	10	29 December 2024	(Italy) Toblach	15 km C MSS	(United States) Jessie Diggins	(Finland) Kerttu Niskanen	(Norway) Astrid Øyre Slind	
TdS	11	31 December 2024	(Italy) Toblach	20 km F	(Norway) Astrid Øyre Slind	(Norway) Therese Johaug	(Finland) Kerttu Niskanen	
TdS	12	1 January 2025	(Italy) Toblach	15 km C PUR	(Norway) Astrid Øyre Slind	(Norway) Therese Johaug	(Finland) Kerttu Niskanen	
TdS	13	3 January 2025	(Italy) Val di Fiemme	Sprint C	(Switzerland) Nadine Fähndrich	(Sweden) Linn Svahn	(Norway) Heidi Weng	
TdS	14	4 January 2025	(Italy) Val di Fiemme	20 km skiathlon	(Norway) Therese Johaug	(Austria) Teresa Stadlober	(Norway) Astrid Øyre Slind	
TdS	15	5 January 2025	(Italy) Val di Fiemme	10 km F MSS Climb	(Norway) Therese Johaug	(Norway) Astrid Øyre Slind	(Norway) Heidi Weng	
9	19th Tour de Ski Overall (28 December 2024 – 5 January 2025)				(Norway) Therese Johaug	(Norway) Astrid Øyre Slind	(United States) Jessie Diggins	
10	16	17 January 2025	(France) Les Rousses	10 km F	(United States) Jessie Diggins	(Germany) Victoria Carl	(Norway) Astrid Øyre Slind	
11	17	18 January 2025	(France) Les Rousses	Sprint C	(Norway) Kristine Stavås Skistad	(Sweden) Maja Dahlqvist	(Sweden) Jonna Sundling	
12	18	19 January 2025	(France) Les Rousses	20 km C MSS	(Sweden) Frida Karlsson	(Sweden) Ebba Andersson	(Austria) Teresa Stadlober	
13	19	25 January 2025	(Switzerland) Engadin	Sprint F	(Sweden) Jonna Sundling	(Norway) Kristine Stavås Skistad	(Sweden) Maja Dahlqvist	
14	20	26 January 2025	(Switzerland) Engadin	20 km F MSS	(Norway) Astrid Øyre Slind	(Norway) Nora Sanness	(Sweden) Jonna Sundling	
15	21	1 February 2025	(Italy) Cogne	Sprint C	(Sweden) Maja Dahlqvist	(Switzerland) Nadine Fähndrich	(Germany) Laura Gimmler	
16	22	2 February 2025	(Italy) Cogne	10 km F	(United States) Jessie Diggins	(Norway) Astrid Øyre Slind	(Finland) Kerttu Niskanen	
17	23	14 February 2025	(Sweden) Falun	Sprint C	(Sweden) Linn Svahn	(Switzerland) Nadine Fähndrich	(Norway) Kristine Stavås Skistad	
18	24	15 February 2025	(Sweden) Falun	10 km C	(Sweden) Ebba Andersson	(Norway) Heidi Weng	(Germany) Victoria Carl	
19	25	16 February 2025	(Sweden) Falun	20 km F MSS	(United States) Jessie Diggins	(Norway) Heidi Weng	(Sweden) Ebba Andersson	
FIS Nordic World Ski Championships 2025 (26 February – 9 March • Trondheim, Norway)
20	26	15 March 2025	(Norway) Oslo	20 km C	(Norway) Therese Johaug	(Norway) Astrid Øyre Slind	(Germany) Victoria Carl	
21	27	16 March 2025	(Norway) Oslo	10 km F	(Sweden) Moa Ilar	(Norway) Heidi Weng	(Germany) Victoria Carl	
22	28	19 March 2025	(Estonia) Tallinn	Sprint F	(Switzerland) Nadine Fähndrich	(Sweden) Maja Dahlqvist	(United States) Julia Kern	
23	29	21 March 2025	(Finland) Lahti	Sprint F	(Germany) Coletta Rydzek	(Norway) Kristine Stavås Skistad	(Switzerland) Nadine Fähndrich	
24	30	23 March 2025	(Finland) Lahti	50 km C MSS	(Norway) Therese Johaug	(Norway) Astrid Øyre Slind	(Sweden) Ebba Andersson	
44th FIS World Cup Overall (29 November 2024 – 23 March 2025)					(United States) Jessie Diggins	(Germany) Victoria Carl	(Finland) Kerttu Niskanen	

=== Overall leaders ===
Holder	Date	Place(s)	Number of competitions
(Sweden) Frida Karlsson	29 November 2024	(Finland) Ruka	1
(Finland) Jasmi Joensuu	30 November 2024	(Finland) Ruka	1
(Sweden) Jonna Sundling	1 December 2024	(Finland) Ruka	1
(Norway) Therese Johaug	6 December 2024	(Norway) Lillehammer	1
(United States) Jessie Diggins	7 December 2024 – 23 March 2025	(Norway) Lillehammer – (Finland) Lahti	27

=== Standings ===
==== Overall ====
Rank	final standings after 31 events	Points
1	(United States) Jessie Diggins	2197
2	(Germany) Victoria Carl	1827
3	(Finland) Kerttu Niskanen	1692
4	(Norway) Astrid Øyre Slind	1682
5	(Norway) Therese Johaug	1435
6	(Czech Republic) Kateřina Janatová	1347
7	(Sweden) Ebba Andersson	1323
8	(Norway) Heidi Weng	1240
9	(Finland) Jasmi Joensuu	1204
10	(Austria) Teresa Stadlober	1194

==== Distance ====
Rank	final standings after 19 events	Points
1	(United States) Jessie Diggins	1384
2	(Norway) Astrid Øyre Slind	1382
3	(Germany) Victoria Carl	1211
4	(Finland) Kerttu Niskanen	1205
5	(Norway) Therese Johaug	1121
6	(Sweden) Ebba Andersson	1096
7	(Austria) Teresa Stadlober	970
8	(Norway) Heidi Weng	956
9	(Norway) Nora Sanness	821
10	(Sweden) Moa Ilar	805

==== Sprint ====
Rank	final standings after 11 events	Points
1	(Finland) Jasmi Joensuu	848
2	(Switzerland) Nadine Fähndrich	732
3	(Sweden) Maja Dahlqvist	682
4	(Germany) Coletta Rydzek	608
5	(Germany) Laura Gimmler	593
6	(Sweden) Johanna Hagström	564
7	(United States) Jessie Diggins	543
8	(Sweden) Jonna Sundling	532
9	(Norway) Julie Myhre	525
10	(Norway) Kristine Stavås Skistad	500

==== U23 ====
Rank	final standings after 31 events	Points
1	(Germany) Helen Hoffmann	564
2	(Canada) Liliane Gagnon	476
3	(Sweden) Märta Rosenberg	472
4	(France) Julie Pierrel	245
5	(Canada) Sonjaa Schmidt	204
6	(United States) Kate Oldham	182
7	(Switzerland) Marina Kälin	180
8	(Canada) Alison Mackie	170
9	(Andorra) Gina Del Rio	154
10	(Italy) Maria Gismondi	143

==== Bonus ranking ====
Rank	final standings after 12 events	Points
1	(Norway) Therese Johaug	295
2	(Norway) Astrid Øyre Slind	229
3	(United States) Jessie Diggins	197
4	(Sweden) Ebba Andersson	188
5	(Finland) Kerttu Niskanen	161
6	(Norway) Heidi Weng	133
7	(Germany) Victoria Carl	104
8	(Norway) Nora Sanness	97
9	(Austria) Teresa Stadlober	92
10	(Switzerland) Nadine Fähndrich	80

==== Prize money ====
Rank	final standings after 39 payouts	CHF
1	(United States) Jessie Diggins	205 900
2	(Norway) Therese Johaug	202 600
3	(Norway) Astrid Øyre Slind	178 700
4	(Germany) Victoria Carl	108 800
5	(Finland) Kerttu Niskanen	107 700
6	(Norway) Heidi Weng	94 100
7	(Sweden) Jonna Sundling	83 400
8	(Sweden) Ebba Andersson	78 800
9	(Switzerland) Nadine Fähndrich	69 500
10	(Sweden) Maja Dahlqvist	63 725

== Team events ==
Event key: C – Classic / F – Freestyle
#	Date	Place	Discipline	Winner	Second	Third	Red bib (After competition)	R.
Mixed team
1	24 January 2025	(Switzerland) Engadin	4 × 5 km relay C/F	Sweden I: 1. Jens Burman; 2. Emma Ribom; 3. Edvin Anger; 4. Moa Ilar	Norway I: 1. Pål Golberg; 2. Nora Sanness; 3. Iver Tildheim Andersen; 4. Kristin Austgulen Fosnæs	Switzerland I: 1. Jonas Baumann; 2. Anja Weber; 3. Jason Rüesch; 4. Nadine Fähndrich	Norway	
Men's Team
1	13 December 2024	(Switzerland) Davos	Sprint F	Norway I: 1. Pål Golberg; 2. Johannes Høsflot Klæbo	Switzerland I: 1. Janik Riebli; 2. Valerio Grond	Sweden I: 1. Johan Häggström; 2. Edvin Anger	Norway	
2	31 January 2025	(Italy) Cogne	Sprint C	Norway I: 1. Even Northug; 2. Erik Valnes	France I: 1. Jules Chappaz; 2. Richard Jouve	Sweden I: 1. Calle Halfvarsson; 2. Oskar Svensson	Norway	
3	22 March 2025	(Finland) Lahti	Sprint F	Norway I: 1. Even Northug; 2. Johannes Høsflot Klæbo	Switzerland I: 1. Janik Riebli; 2. Valerio Grond	France I: 1. Richard Jouve; 2. Jules Chappaz	Norway	
Women's Team
1	13 December 2024	(Switzerland) Davos	Sprint F	Sweden I: 1. Emma Ribom; 2. Jonna Sundling	Norway: 1. Astrid Øyre Slind; 2. Kristin Austgulen Fosnæs	Switzerland I: 1. Anja Weber; 2. Nadine Fähndrich	Norway	
2	31 January 2025	(Italy) Cogne	Sprint C	Finland I: 1. Kerttu Niskanen; 2. Jasmi Joensuu	Sweden I: 1. Johanna Hagström; 2. Maja Dahlqvist	Germany I: 1. Laura Gimmler; 2. Coletta Rydzek	Norway	
3	22 March 2025	(Finland) Lahti	Sprint F	Germany I: 1. Laura Gimmler; 2. Coletta Rydzek	Sweden I: 1. Johanna Hagström; 2. Maja Dahlqvist	Switzerland I: 1. Anja Weber; 2. Nadine Fähndrich	Norway	

== Nations Cup ==
=== Overall ===
Rank	final standings after 69 events	Points
1	Norway	17312
2	Sweden	11888
3	Finland	9559
4	United States	8368
5	Germany	8334
6	France	7316
7	Switzerland	5587
8	Italy	5513
9	Czech Republic	3512
10	Austria	3284

=== Men ===
Rank	final standings after 35 events	Points
1	Norway	9216
2	France	5267
3	Sweden	5076
4	Finland	4139
5	United States	3678
6	Italy	3382
7	Germany	2603
8	Switzerland	2508
9	Austria	1761
10	Czech Republic	1472

=== Women ===
Rank	final standings after 35 events	Points
1	Norway	8096
2	Sweden	6812
3	Germany	5731
4	Finland	5420
5	United States	4690
6	Switzerland	3079
7	Italy	2131
8	France	2049
9	Czech Republic	2040
10	Canada	1777

== Podium table by nation ==
Table showing the World Cup podium places (gold–1st place, silver–2nd place, bronze–3rd place) by the countries represented by the athletes.

Rank	Nation	Gold	Silver	Bronze	Total
1	Norway	42	39	31	112
2	Sweden	14	11	9	34
3	United States	6	1	4	11
4	Finland	3	5	4	12
5	Switzerland	2	4	6	12
6	Germany	2	1	6	9
7	France	0	5	4	9
8	Austria	0	3	1	4
9	Italy	0	1	2	3
10	Great Britain	0	0	1	1
Totals (10 entries)		69	70	68	207

== Point distribution ==
The table shows the number of points to win in every competition in the 2024–25 Cross-Country Skiing World Cup for men and women.

Place	1	2	3	4	5	6	7	8	9	10	11	12	13	14	15	16	17	18	19	20	21	22	23	24	25	26	27	28	29	30	31	32	33	34	35	36	37	38	39	40	41	42	43	44	45	46	47	48	49	50
Individual	100	95	90	85	80	75	72	69	66	63	60	58	56	54	52	50	48	46	44	42	40	38	36	34	32	30	28	26	24	22	20	19	18	17	16	15	14	13	12	11	10	9	8	7	6	5	4	3	2	1
Relay	200	160	120	100	90	80	72	64	58	52	48	44	40	36	32	30	28	26	24	22	20	18	16	14	12	10	8	6	4	2
Team sprint	200	160	120	100	90	80	72	64	58	52	48	44	40	36	32	30	28	26	24	22	20	18	16	14	12	10	8	6	4	2
Tour de Ski	300	285	270	255	240	225	216	207	198	189	180	174	168	162	156	150	144	138	132	126	120	114	108	102	96	90	84	78	72	66	60	57	54	51	48	45	42	39	36	33	30	27	24	21	18	15	12	9	6	3
Stage Tour de Ski	50	47	44	41	38	35	32	30	28	26	24	22	20	18	16	15	14	13	12	11	10	9	8	7	6	5	4	3	2	1
Bonus points (MSS checkpoints)	15	12	10	8	6	5	4	3	2	1
Sprint Q	15	12	10	8	6	5	4	3	2	1

== Achievements ==
Only individual events.

First World Cup career victory

Men

- (Sweden) Edvin Anger (22), in his 3rd season – the WC 11 (Sprint C) in Les Rousses; first podium was 2023–24 WC 10 (Sprint F) in Davos
- (Sweden) William Poromaa (24), in his 7th season – the WC 12 (20 km Mass Start C) in Les Rousses; first podium was 2021–22 WC 11 (15 km C) in Lahti

Women

- (Sweden) Johanna Hagström (26), in her 9th season – the WC 2 (Sprint C) in Ruka; first podium was 2018–19 WC 13 (Sprint F) in Cogne
- (Norway) Astrid Øyre Slind (36), in her 10th season – the WC 8 (20 km C) in Davos; first podium was 2022–23 WC 15 (20 km Mass Start C) in Les Rousses
- (Germany) Coletta Rydzek (27), in her 7th season – the WC 29 (Sprint F) in Lahti; first podium was 2023–24 WC 28 (Sprint F) in Lahti

First World Cup podium

Men

- (Norway) Einar Hedegart (23), in his 1st season – the WC 21 (10 km F) in Oslo – 2nd place
- (Norway) Håvard Moseby (25), in his 3rd season – the WC 9 (15 km Mass Start C) in Toblach – 3rd place
- (Sweden) Marcus Grate (28), in his 8th season – the WC 9 (Sprint C) in Val di Fiemme – 3rd place
- (Norway) Oskar Opstad Vike (21), in his 1st season – the WC 17 (Sprint C) in Falun – 3rd place

Women

- (Norway) Julie Myhre (28), in her 7th season – the WC 2 (Sprint C) in Ruka – 2nd place
- (Finland) Jasmi Joensuu (28), in her 7th season – the WC 9 (Sprint F) in Toblach – 2nd place
- (Norway) Nora Sanness (24), in her 3rd season – the WC 14 (20 km Mass Start F) in Engadin – 2nd place
- (Germany) Laura Gimmler (31), in her 10th season – the WC 15 (Sprint C) in Cogne – 3rd place

Number of wins this season (in brackets are all-time wins)

Men

- (Norway) Johannes Høsflot Klæbo – 14 (98) (Note: Men's all-time record in World Cup history)
- (Norway) Harald Østberg Amundsen – 6 (11)
- (Norway) Martin Løwstrøm Nyenget – 3 (5)
- (Finland) Iivo Niskanen – 2 (10)
- (Norway) Pål Golberg – 1 (13)
- (Norway) Simen Hegstad Krüger – 1 (11)
- (Norway) Erik Valnes – 1 (6)
- (Norway) Iver Tildheim Andersen – 1 (2)
- (Sweden) Edvin Anger – 1 (1)
- (Sweden) William Poromaa – 1 (1)

Women

- (Norway) Therese Johaug – 7 (89)
- (United States) Jessie Diggins – 6 (27)
- (Norway) Astrid Øyre Slind – 4 (4)
- (Sweden) Jonna Sundling – 3 (12)
- (Sweden) Frida Karlsson – 2 (13)
- (Switzerland) Nadine Fähndrich – 2 (6)
- (Sweden) Linn Svahn – 1 (16)
- (Norway) Kristine Stavås Skistad – 1 (11)
- (Sweden) Ebba Andersson – 1 (8)
- (Sweden) Maja Dahlqvist – 1 (6)
- (Sweden) Moa Ilar – 1 (2)
- (Sweden) Johanna Hagström – 1 (1)
- (Germany) Coletta Rydzek – 1 (1)

== Comebacks ==
The following notable skiers, who competed in the World Cup, resumed their careers for the 2024–25 season after retiring before.

Men

Women

- (Norway) Therese Johaug

== Retirements ==
The following notable skiers, who competed in the World Cup, retire during or after the 2024–25 season:

Men

- (Switzerland) Jonas Baumann
- (Norway) Pål Golberg
- (Norway) Mikael Gunnulfsen
- (France) Renaud Jay
- (Switzerland) Roman Schaad

Women

- (France) Maëlle Veyre
- (Norway) Therese Johaug
- (Norway) Marte Skaanes
- (Norway) Helene Marie Fossesholm
