= Erik Valnes =

Norwegian cross-country skier (born 1996)

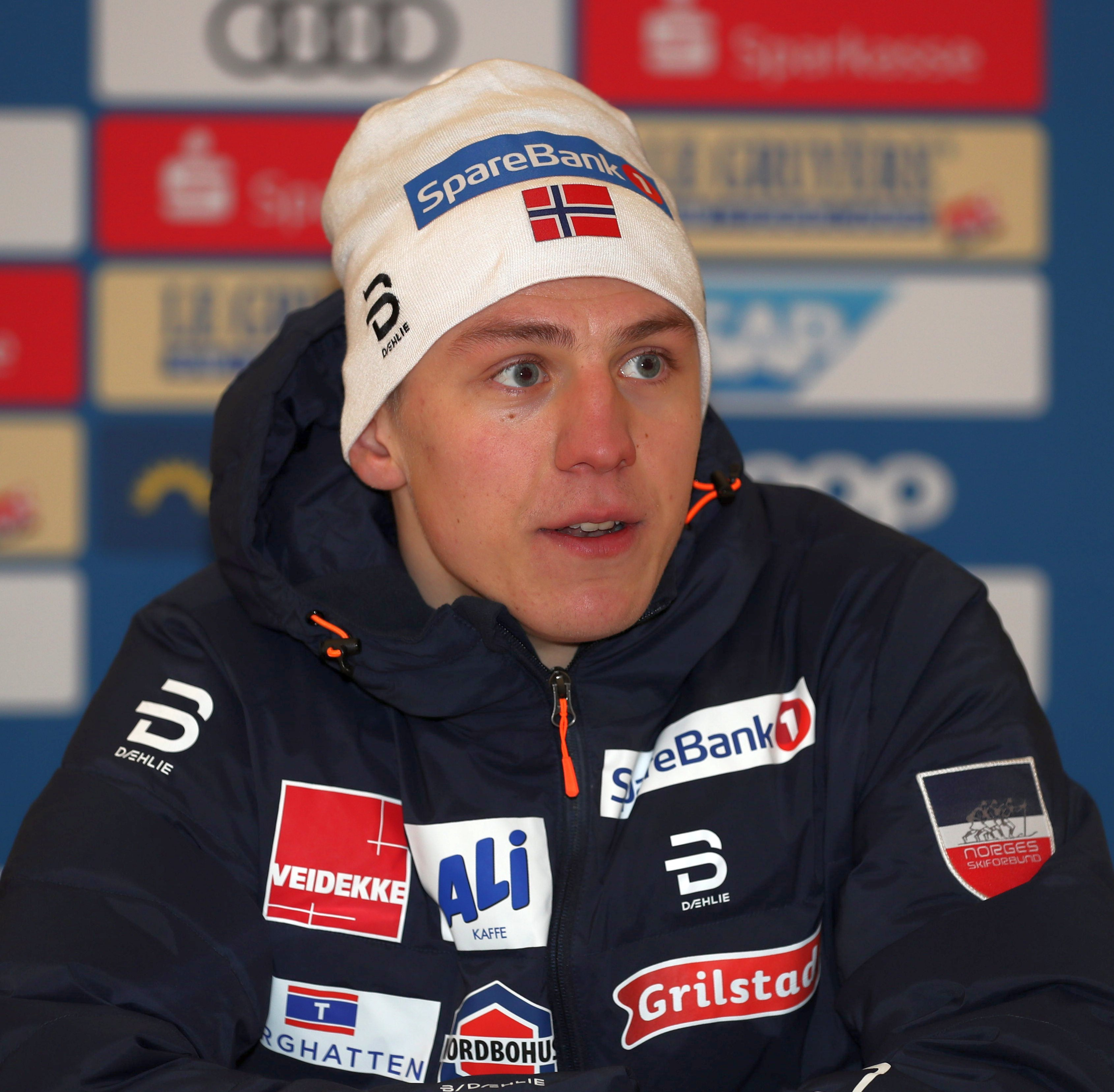
- Valnes in January 2019

Personal information
- Nationality: Norway
- Born: 19 April 1996 (age 30)

Sport
- Sport: Skiing
- Club: Bardufoss og Omegn IF

World Cup career
- Seasons: 8 – (2018–present)
- Indiv. starts: 113
- Indiv. podiums: 29
- Indiv. wins: 6
- Team starts: 10
- Team podiums: 7
- Team wins: 7
- Overall titles: 0 – (3rd in 2024, 2025)
- Discipline titles: 0
Medal record
Men's cross-country skiing
Representing Norway
Olympic Games
Gold medal – first place	2022 Beijing	Team sprint
World Championships
Gold medal – first place	2021 Oberstdorf	Team sprint
Gold medal – first place	2025 Trondheim	Team sprint
Gold medal – first place	2025 Trondheim	4 × 7.5 km relay
Silver medal – second place	2021 Oberstdorf	Individual sprint
Silver medal – second place	2025 Trondheim	10 km classical
U23 World Championships
Gold medal – first place	2018 Goms	Individual sprint
Gold medal – first place	2019 Lahti	Individual sprint
- Updated on 12 December 2025

Erik Valnes (born 19 April 1996) is a Norwegian cross-country skier.

At the 2018 Junior World Championships (U23) he won the gold medal in the sprint, and also competed in the 15 km event.

He made his World Cup debut in December 2017 in Lillehammer, also breaking the top 30-barrier with a 27th place in the sprint there.

He represents the sports club Bardufoss og Omegn IF.

== Cross-country skiing results ==
All results are sourced from the International Ski Federation (FIS).

=== Olympic Games ===
- 1 medal (1 gold)

Year	Age	15 km individual	30 km skiathlon	50 km mass start	Sprint	4 × 10 km relay	Team sprint
2022	25	15	—	—^{[a]}	11	—	Gold

^{a} Distance reduced to 30 km due to weather conditions.

=== World Championships ===
- 5 medals – (3 gold, 2 silver)

Year	Age	10/15 km individual	20/30 km skiathlon	50 km mass start	Sprint	4 × 7.5/10 km relay	Team sprint
2021	24	—	—	—	Silver	—	Gold
2023	26	—	—	—	11	—	—
2025	28	Silver	—	—	—	Gold	Gold

=== World Cup ===
==== Season standings ====
Season	Age	Discipline standings				Ski Tour standings			
Season	Age	Overall	Distance	Sprint	U23	Nordic Opening	Tour de Ski	Ski Tour 2020	World Cup Final
2018	21	120	—	66	17	—	—	—N/a	—
2019	22	40	—	12	6	—	—	—N/a	—
2020	23	12	33	2nd place, silver medalist(s)	—N/a	12	DNF	23	—N/a
2021	24	38	46	17	—N/a	24	—	—N/a	—N/a
2022	25	5	21	7	—N/a	—N/a	8	—N/a	—N/a
2023	26	10	36	8	—N/a	—N/a	—	—N/a	—N/a
2024	27	3rd place, bronze medalist(s)	9	2nd place, silver medalist(s)	—N/a	—N/a	6	—N/a	—N/a
2025	28	3rd place, bronze medalist(s)	17	2nd place, silver medalist(s)	—N/a	—N/a	7	—N/a	—N/a

==== Individual podiums ====
- 6 victories – (4 WC, 2 SWC)
- 29 podiums – (22 WC, 7 SWC)

No.	Season	Date	Location	Race	Level	Place
1	2018–19	12 January 2019	Dresden, Germany	1.6 km Sprint F	World Cup	3rd
2	2019–20	21 December 2019	Planica, Slovenia	1.2 km Sprint F	World Cup	3rd
3	2019–20	26 January 2020	Oberstdorf, Germany	1.6 km Sprint C	World Cup	3rd
4	2019–20	8 February 2020	Falun, Sweden	1.4 km Sprint C	World Cup	2nd
5	2019–20	22 February 2020	Trondheim, Norway	1.5 km Sprint C	Stage World Cup	3rd
6	2020–21	27 November 2020	Rukatunturi, Finland	1.4 km Sprint C	Stage World Cup	1st
7	2021–22	26 November 2021	Rukatunturi, Finland	1.4 km Sprint C	World Cup	3rd
8	2021–22	1 January 2022	Oberstdorf, Germany	1.5 km Sprint C	Stage World Cup	2nd
9	2022–23	14 March 2023	Drammen, Norway	1.2 km Sprint C	World Cup	2nd
10	2022–23	18 March 2023	Falun, Sweden	1.4 km Sprint F	World Cup	2nd
11	2022–23	25 March 2023	(Finland) Lahti, Sweden	1.4 km Sprint C	World Cup	3rd
12	2023–24	24 November 2023	Rukatunturi, Finland	1.4 km Sprint C	World Cup	1st
13	2023–24	25 November 2023	Rukatunturi, Finland	10 km Individual C	World Cup	3rd
14	2023–24	9 December 2023	Östersund, Sweden	1.4 km Sprint C	World Cup	2nd
15	2023–24	31 December 2023	Toblach, Italy	10 km Individual C	Stage World Cup	2nd
16	2023–24	1 January 2024	Toblach, Italy	20 km Pursuit F	Stage World Cup	2nd
17	2023–24	6 January 2024	Val di Fiemme, Italy	15 km Mass Start C	Stage World Cup	1st
18	2023–24	19 January 2024	Oberhof, Germany	1.3 km Sprint C	World Cup	1st
19	2023–24	20 January 2024	Oberhof, Germany	20 km Mass Start C	World Cup	1st
20	2023–24	10 February 2024	Canmore, Canada	1.3 km Sprint F	World Cup	2nd
21	2023–24	13 February 2024	Canmore, Canada	1.3 km Sprint C	World Cup	3rd
22	2024–25	30 November 2024	Rukatunturi, Finland	1.4 km Sprint C	World Cup	2nd
23	2024–25	14 December 2024	Davos, Switzerland	1.5 km Sprint F	World Cup	3rd
24	2024–25	29 December 2024	Toblach, Italy	15 km Mass Start C	Stage World Cup	2nd
25	2024–25	18 January 2025	Les Rousses, France	1.3 km Sprint C	World Cup	3rd
26	2024–25	1 February 2025	Cogne, Italy	1.3 km Sprint C	World Cup	1st
27	2024–25	14 February 2025	Falun, Sweden	1.4 km Sprint C	World Cup	2nd
28	2024–25	15 February 2025	Falun, Sweden	10 km Individual C	World Cup	3rd
29	2025–26	29 November 2025	Rukatunturi, Finland	1.4 km Sprint C	World Cup	2nd

==== Team podiums ====
- 7 victories – (2 RL, 5 TS)
- 7 podiums – (2 RL, 5 TS)

No.	Season	Date	Location	Race	Level	Place	Teammate(s)
1	2018–19	13 January 2019	Dresden, Germany	6 × 1.6 km Team Sprint F	World Cup	1st	Skar
2	2019–20	22 December 2019	Planica, Slovenia	6 × 1.2 km Team Sprint F	World Cup	1st	Skar
3	2021–22	5 December 2021	Lillehammer, Norway	4 × 7.5 km Relay C/F	World Cup	1st	Iversen / Krüger / Klæbo
4	2022–23	24 March 2023	Lahti, Finland	6 × 1.4 km Team Sprint F	World Cup	1st	Klæbo
5	2023–24	21 January 2024	Oberhof, Germany	4 × 7.5 km Relay C/F	World Cup	1st	Nyenget / Golberg / Klæbo
6	2024–25	31 January 2025	Cogne, Italy	6 × 1.3 km Team Sprint C	World Cup	1st	Northug
7	2025–26	12 December 2025	Davos, Switzerland	6 × 1.2 km Team Sprint F	World Cup	1st	Klæbo
