= Iver Tildheim Andersen =

Norwegian cross-country skier

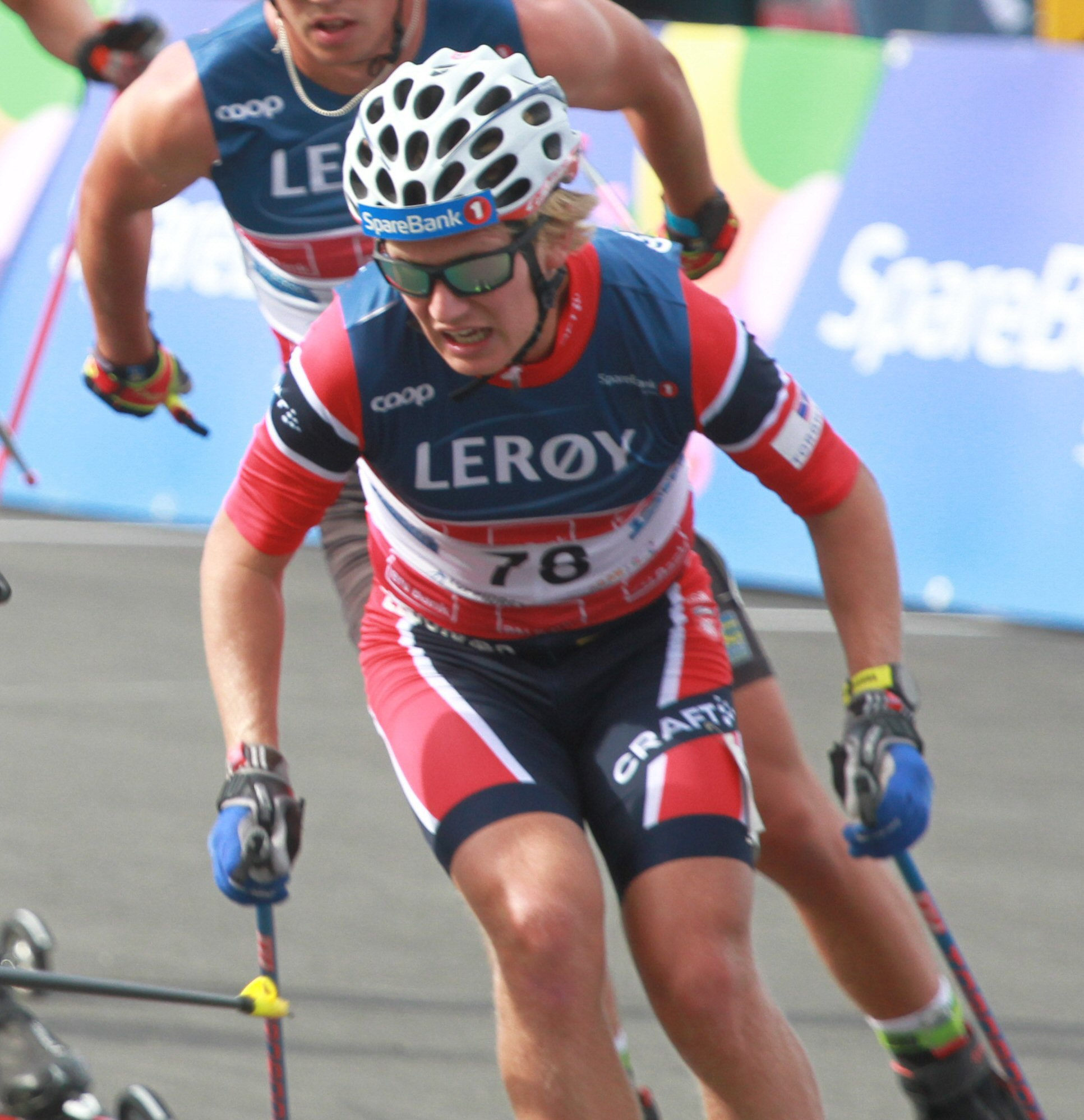

Personal information
- Nationality: Norway
- Born: 29 September 2000 (age 26)

Sport
- Sport: Skiing
- Club: Rustad IL

World Cup career
- Seasons: 3 – (2022–present)
- Indiv. starts: 25
- Indiv. podiums: 5
- Indiv. wins: 2
- Team starts: 2
- Team podiums: 1
- Overall titles: 0 – (18th in 2025)
- Discipline titles: 0
Medal record
Men's cross-country skiing
Representing Norway
U23 World Championships
Bronze medal – third place	2021 Vuokatti	15 km freestyle
Junior World Championships
Gold medal – first place	2021 Oberwiesenthal	30 km freestyle
Bronze medal – third place	2019 Lahti	10 km freestyle
- Updated on 16 March 2025

Iver Tildheim Andersen (born 29 September 2000) is a Norwegian cross-country skier. He obtained his first World Cup win in December 2022, winning the 10 kilometer freestyle in Lillehammer, Norway. He also placed third in the 15 kilometer freestyle at the 2021 Nordic Under-23 World Ski Championships.

== Cross-country skiing results ==
All results are sourced from the International Ski Federation (FIS).

=== World Cup ===
==== Season standings ====
Season	Age	Discipline standings				Ski Tour standings
Season	Age	Overall	Distance	Sprint	U23	Tour de Ski
2022	21	134	77	—	24	—
2023	22	36	17	—	7	—
2024	23	51	26	—	—N/a	—
2025	24	18	15	—	—N/a	14

==== Individual podiums ====
- 2 victories – (2 WC)
- 5 podiums – (5 WC)

No.	Season	Date	Location	Race	Level	Place
1	2022–23	2 December 2022	Lillehammer, Norway	10 km Individual F	World Cup	1st
2	2023–24	2 December 2023	Gällivare, Sweden	10 km Individual F	World Cup	3rd
3	2024–25	17 January 2025	Les Rousses, France	10 km Individual F	World Cup	1st
4	2024–25	26 January 2025	Engadin, Switzerland	20 km Mass Start F	World Cup	2nd
5	2024–25	2 February 2025	Cogne, Italy	10 km Individual F	World Cup	2nd
