= 2021–22 FIS Cross-Country World Cup =

Cross-country skiing competition

Discipline	Men	Women
Overall	(Norway) Johannes Høsflot Klæbo (3)	(Russia) Natalya Nepryayeva (1)
Distance	(Finland) Iivo Niskanen (1)	(Norway) Therese Johaug (5)
Sprint	(France) Richard Jouve (1)	(Sweden) Maja Dahlqvist (1)
U23	(Russia) Alexander Terentyev (1)	(Sweden) Frida Karlsson (1)
Bonus Ranking	(Finland) Iivo Niskanen (1)	(Finland) Kerttu Niskanen (1)
Nations Cup	Norway (33)	Sweden (2)
- Nations Cup Overall: Norway (33)

Stage events
Tour de Ski	(Norway) Johannes Høsflot Klæbo (2)	(Russia) Natalya Nepryayeva (1)

Competition
Locations	11 venues	11 venues
Individual	20 events	20 events
Relay/Team	4 events	4 events
Cancelled	8 events	8 events

The 2021–22 FIS Cross-Country World Cup was the 41st official World Cup season in cross-country skiing for men and women.

The season began on 26 November 2021 in Ruka, Finland and was scheduled to conclude with the World Cup Finals on 18–20 March 2022 in Tyumen, Russia. But after the Russian invasion of Ukraine FIS announced that the World Cup Finals would be cancelled or moved. As a result, the final competition was the mixed team events on 13 March 2022 in Falun, Sweden. The season featured a break in February for the 2022 Winter Olympics in Beijing.

On 1 March 2022, following the 2022 Russian invasion of Ukraine, FIS decided to exclude athletes from Russia and Belarus from FIS competitions, with an immediate effect.

== Men ==
=== Calendar ===
Key: C – Classic / F – Freestyle
WC	Stage	Date	Place	Discipline	Winner	Second	Third	Yellow bib	Ref.
1	1	26 November 2021	(Finland) Ruka	Sprint C	(Russia) Alexander Terentyev	(Norway) Johannes Høsflot Klæbo	(Norway) Erik Valnes	(Russia) Alexander Terentyev	
2	2	27 November 2021	(Finland) Ruka	15 km C	(Finland) Iivo Niskanen	(Russia) Aleksey Chervotkin	(Russia) Alexander Bolshunov	(Norway) Johannes Høsflot Klæbo	
3	3	28 November 2021	(Finland) Ruka	15 km F Pursuit	(Russia) Alexander Bolshunov	(Russia) Sergey Ustiugov	(Russia) Artem Maltsev	(Russia) Alexander Bolshunov	
4	4	3 December 2021	(Norway) Lillehammer	Sprint F	(Norway) Johannes Høsflot Klæbo	(Norway) Thomas Helland Larsen	(France) Richard Jouve	(Norway) Johannes Høsflot Klæbo	
5	5	4 December 2021	(Norway) Lillehammer	15 km F	(Norway) Simen Hegstad Krüger	(Norway) Hans Christer Holund	(Norway) Martin Løwstrøm Nyenget	(Norway) Johannes Høsflot Klæbo	
6	6	11 December 2021	(Switzerland) Davos	Sprint F	(Norway) Johannes Høsflot Klæbo	(Russia) Sergey Ustiugov	(France) Richard Jouve	(Norway) Johannes Høsflot Klæbo	
7	7	12 December 2021	(Switzerland) Davos	15 km F	(Norway) Simen Hegstad Krüger	(Norway) Johannes Høsflot Klæbo	(Russia) Sergey Ustiugov	(Norway) Johannes Høsflot Klæbo	
8	8	18 December 2021	(Germany) Dresden	Sprint F	(Norway) Håvard Solås Taugbøl	(Italy) Federico Pellegrino	(France) Lucas Chanavat	(Norway) Johannes Høsflot Klæbo	
	9	28 December 2021	(Switzerland) Lenzerheide	Sprint F	(Norway) Johannes Høsflot Klæbo	(France) Richard Jouve	(France) Lucas Chanavat	(Norway) Johannes Høsflot Klæbo	
	10	29 December 2021	(Switzerland) Lenzerheide	15 km C	(Finland) Iivo Niskanen	(Russia) Alexander Bolshunov	(Norway) Pål Golberg	(Norway) Johannes Høsflot Klæbo	
	11	31 December 2021	(Germany) Oberstdorf	15 km F Mass Start	(Norway) Johannes Høsflot Klæbo	(Russia) Alexander Bolshunov	(Norway) Sjur Røthe	(Norway) Johannes Høsflot Klæbo	
	12	1 January 2022	(Germany) Oberstdorf	Sprint C	(Norway) Johannes Høsflot Klæbo	(Norway) Erik Valnes	(Norway) Pål Golberg	(Norway) Johannes Høsflot Klæbo	
	13	3 January 2022	(Italy) Val di Fiemme	15 km C Mass Start	(Norway) Johannes Høsflot Klæbo	(Finland) Iivo Niskanen	(Russia) Aleksey Chervotkin	(Norway) Johannes Høsflot Klæbo	
	14	4 January 2022	(Italy) Val di Fiemme	10 km F Mass Start Climb	(Norway) Sjur Røthe	(Russia) Denis Spitsov	(Germany) Friedrich Moch	(Norway) Johannes Høsflot Klæbo	
9	16th Tour de Ski Overall (28 December 2021 – 4 January 2022)				(Norway) Johannes Høsflot Klæbo	(Russia) Alexander Bolshunov	(Finland) Iivo Niskanen	(Norway) Johannes Høsflot Klæbo	
		14 January 2022	(France) Les Rousses	Sprint F	Cancelled due to the COVID-19 pandemic				
		15 January 2022	(France) Les Rousses	15 km F	Cancelled due to the COVID-19 pandemic				
		16 January 2022	(France) Les Rousses	15 km C Pursuit	Cancelled due to the COVID-19 pandemic				
		22 January 2022	(Slovenia) Planica	Sprint C	Cancelled due to the COVID-19 pandemic				
		23 January 2022	(Slovenia) Planica	30 km Skiathlon	Cancelled due to the COVID-19 pandemic				
2022 Winter Olympics (6–19 February)
10	15	26 February 2022	(Finland) Lahti	Sprint F	(Norway) Johannes Høsflot Klæbo	(France) Lucas Chanavat	(Norway) Sindre Bjørnestad Skar	(Norway) Johannes Høsflot Klæbo	
11	16	27 February 2022	(Finland) Lahti	15 km C	(Finland) Iivo Niskanen	(Norway) Johannes Høsflot Klæbo	(Sweden) William Poromaa	(Norway) Johannes Høsflot Klæbo	
12	17	3 March 2022	(Norway) Drammen	Sprint C	(France) Richard Jouve	(China) Wang Qiang	(France) Lucas Chanavat	(Norway) Johannes Høsflot Klæbo	
13	18	6 March 2022	(Norway) Oslo	50 km C Mass Start	(Norway) Martin Løwstrøm Nyenget	(Norway) Sjur Røthe	(Norway) Didrik Tønseth	(Norway) Johannes Høsflot Klæbo	
14	19	11 March 2022	(Sweden) Falun	Sprint C	(France) Richard Jouve	(Finland) Joni Mäki	(France) Lucas Chanavat	(Norway) Johannes Høsflot Klæbo	
15	20	12 March 2022	(Sweden) Falun	15 km F	(Norway) Didrik Tønseth	(Sweden) Calle Halfvarsson	(Norway) Harald Østberg Amundsen	(Norway) Johannes Høsflot Klæbo	
		18 March 2022	(Russia) Tyumen	Sprint F	Cancelled due to the Russian invasion of Ukraine				
		19 March 2022	(Russia) Tyumen	15 km F Mass Start	Cancelled due to the Russian invasion of Ukraine				
		20 March 2022	(Russia) Tyumen	15 km C Pursuit	Cancelled due to the Russian invasion of Ukraine				
	2021–22 World Cup Finals (18–20 March 2022)				Cancelled due to the Russian invasion of Ukraine				

=== Men's relay ===
Key: C – Classic / F – Freestyle
WC	Date	Place	Discipline	Winner	Second	Third	Leader	Ref.
1	5 December 2021	(Norway) Lillehammer	4 × 7.5 km Relay C/F	Norway I Erik Valnes; Emil Iversen; Simen Hegstad Krüger; Johannes Høsflot Klæbo	Russia II Alexander Terentyev; Ilia Semikov; Artem Maltsev; Sergey Ustiugov	Norway II Pål Golberg; Martin Løwstrøm Nyenget; Hans Christer Holund; Harald Østberg Amundsen	Norway	
2	19 December 2021	(Germany) Dresden	Team Sprint F	Norway II Thomas Helland Larsen; Even Northug	Norway I Sindre Bjørnestad Skar; Håvard Solås Taugbøl	Russia I Alexander Bolshunov; Gleb Retivykh	Norway	
2022 Winter Olympics (13 February)

=== Standings ===
==== Overall ====
Rank	after all 23 events	Points
	(Norway) Johannes Høsflot Klæbo	1375
2.	(Russia) Alexander Bolshunov	878
3.	(Finland) Iivo Niskanen	744
4.	(France) Richard Jouve	614
5.	(Norway) Erik Valnes	559
6.	(Norway) Didrik Tønseth	527
7.	(Norway) Martin Løwstrøm Nyenget	501
8.	(Norway) Harald Østberg Amundsen	493
9.	(Norway) Pål Golberg	489
10.	(France) Lucas Chanavat	461

==== Distance ====
Rank	after all 12 events	Points
	(Finland) Iivo Niskanen	493
2.	(Russia) Alexander Bolshunov	418
3.	(Norway) Johannes Høsflot Klæbo	413
4.	(Norway) Martin Løwstrøm Nyenget	399
5.	(Norway) Didrik Tønseth	383
6.	(Norway) Sjur Røthe	316
7.	(Russia) Aleksey Chervotkin	307
8.	(Norway) Simen Hegstad Krüger	304
9.	(Norway) Harald Østberg Amundsen	300
10.	(Norway) Hans Christer Holund	291

==== Sprint ====
Rank	after all 10 events	Points
	(France) Richard Jouve	568
2.	(Norway) Johannes Høsflot Klæbo	562
3.	(France) Lucas Chanavat	461
4.	(Italy) Federico Pellegrino	330
5.	(Norway) Håvard Solås Taugbøl	324
6.	(Russia) Alexander Terentyev	292
7.	(Norway) Erik Valnes	270
8.	(Norway) Even Northug	251
9.	(Russia) Gleb Retivykh	212
10.	(Finland) Joni Mäki	197

==== U23 ====
Rank	after all 23 events	Points
Green bib	(Russia) Alexander Terentyev	330
2.	(Germany) Friedrich Moch	213
3.	(Sweden) William Poromaa	162
4.	(United States) JC Schoonmaker	113
5.	(Switzerland) Valerio Grond	79
6.	(United States) Ben Ogden	78
7.	(Norway) Håvard Moseby	71
8.	(Norway) Lars Agnar Hjelmeset	58
9.	(Canada) Olivier Léveillé	52
10.	(Norway) Håkon Skaanes	51

==== Bonus Ranking ====
Rank	after all 4 events	Points
1.	(Finland) Iivo Niskanen	99
2.	(Norway) Johannes Høsflot Klæbo	75
3.	(Norway) Didrik Tønseth	61
4.	(Norway) Martin Løwstrøm Nyenget	60
5.	(Norway) Erik Valnes	54
6.	(Norway) Harald Østberg Amundsen	46
7.	(Norway) Pål Golberg	45
8.	(Norway) Hans Christer Holund	43
9.	(Norway) Even Northug	37
10.	(United Kingdom) Andrew Musgrave	35

==== Prize money ====
Rank	after all 33 payouts	CHF
1.	(Norway) Johannes Høsflot Klæbo	176 400
2.	(Russia) Alexander Bolshunov	91 525
3.	(Finland) Iivo Niskanen	74 400
4.	(France) Richard Jouve	53 250
5.	(Norway) Erik Valnes	37 000
6.	(Norway) Didrik Tønseth	34 150
7.	(Norway) Martin Løwstrøm Nyenget	32 400
8.	(Norway) Simen Hegstad Krüger	30 300
9.	(Norway) Håvard Solås Taugbøl	29 600
10.	(France) Lucas Chanavat	28 850

== Women ==
=== Calendar ===
Key: C – Classic / F – Freestyle
WC	Stage	Date	Place	Discipline	Winner	Second	Third	Yellow bib	Ref.
1	1	26 November 2021	(Finland) Ruka	Sprint C	(Sweden) Maja Dahlqvist	(Sweden) Johanna Hagström	(Norway) Maiken Caspersen Falla	(Sweden) Maja Dahlqvist	
2	2	27 November 2021	(Finland) Ruka	10 km C	(Sweden) Frida Karlsson	(Norway) Therese Johaug	(Germany) Katharina Hennig	(Sweden) Frida Karlsson	
3	3	28 November 2021	(Finland) Ruka	10 km F Pursuit	(Norway) Therese Johaug	(Sweden) Frida Karlsson	(Norway) Heidi Weng	(Sweden) Frida Karlsson	
4	4	3 December 2021	(Norway) Lillehammer	Sprint F	(Sweden) Maja Dahlqvist	(United States) Jessie Diggins	(Norway) Tiril Udnes Weng	(Sweden) Maja Dahlqvist	
5	5	4 December 2021	(Norway) Lillehammer	10 km F	(Sweden) Frida Karlsson	(Norway) Therese Johaug	(United States) Rosie Brennan	(Sweden) Frida Karlsson	
6	6	11 December 2021	(Switzerland) Davos	Sprint F	(Sweden) Maja Dahlqvist	(Switzerland) Nadine Fähndrich	(Slovenia) Anamarija Lampič	(Sweden) Frida Karlsson	
7	7	12 December 2021	(Switzerland) Davos	10 km F	(Norway) Therese Johaug	(United States) Jessie Diggins	(Sweden) Frida Karlsson	(Sweden) Frida Karlsson	
8	8	18 December 2021	(Germany) Dresden	Sprint F	(Sweden) Maja Dahlqvist	(Sweden) Jonna Sundling	(Slovenia) Anamarija Lampič	(Sweden) Maja Dahlqvist	
	9	28 December 2021	(Switzerland) Lenzerheide	Sprint F	(United States) Jessie Diggins	(Norway) Mathilde Myhrvold	(Slovenia) Anamarija Lampič	(Sweden) Maja Dahlqvist	
	10	29 December 2021	(Switzerland) Lenzerheide	10 km C	(Finland) Kerttu Niskanen	(Sweden) Ebba Andersson	(Russia) Natalya Nepryayeva	(Sweden) Maja Dahlqvist	
	11	31 December 2021	(Germany) Oberstdorf	10 km F Mass Start	(United States) Jessie Diggins	(Sweden) Frida Karlsson	(Russia) Tatiana Sorina	(Sweden) Frida Karlsson	
	12	1 January 2022	(Germany) Oberstdorf	Sprint C	(Russia) Natalya Nepryayeva	(Sweden) Johanna Hagström	(Finland) Johanna Matintalo	(Sweden) Frida Karlsson	
	13	3 January 2022	(Italy) Val di Fiemme	10 km C Mass Start	(Russia) Natalya Nepryayeva	(Norway) Heidi Weng	(Finland) Krista Pärmäkoski	(Sweden) Frida Karlsson	
	14	4 January 2022	(Italy) Val di Fiemme	10 km F Mass Start Climb	(Norway) Heidi Weng	(Sweden) Ebba Andersson	(France) Delphine Claudel	(United States) Jessie Diggins	
9	16th Tour de Ski Overall (28 December 2021 – 4 January 2022)				(Russia) Natalya Nepryayeva	(Sweden) Ebba Andersson	(Norway) Heidi Weng	(Russia) Natalya Nepryayeva	
		14 January 2022	(France) Les Rousses	Sprint F	Cancelled due to the COVID-19 pandemic				
		15 January 2022	(France) Les Rousses	10 km F	Cancelled due to the COVID-19 pandemic				
		16 January 2022	(France) Les Rousses	10 km C Pursuit	Cancelled due to the COVID-19 pandemic				
		22 January 2022	(Slovenia) Planica	Sprint C	Cancelled due to the COVID-19 pandemic				
		23 January 2022	(Slovenia) Planica	15 km Skiathlon	Cancelled due to the COVID-19 pandemic				
2022 Winter Olympics (5–20 February)
10	15	26 February 2022	(Finland) Lahti	Sprint F	(Sweden) Jonna Sundling	(Sweden) Emma Ribom	(Sweden) Maja Dahlqvist	(Russia) Natalya Nepryayeva	
11	16	27 February 2022	(Finland) Lahti	10 km C	(Norway) Therese Johaug	(Russia) Natalya Nepryayeva	(Finland) Krista Pärmäkoski	(Russia) Natalya Nepryayeva	
12	17	3 March 2022	(Norway) Drammen	Sprint C	(Norway) Maiken Caspersen Falla	(Sweden) Jonna Sundling	(Slovenia) Anamarija Lampič	(Russia) Natalya Nepryayeva	
13	18	5 March 2022	(Norway) Oslo	30 km C Mass Start	(Norway) Therese Johaug	(Finland) Krista Pärmäkoski	(Sweden) Jonna Sundling	(Russia) Natalya Nepryayeva	
14	19	11 March 2022	(Sweden) Falun	Sprint C	(Sweden) Jonna Sundling	(Slovenia) Anamarija Lampič	(Sweden) Maja Dahlqvist	(Russia) Natalya Nepryayeva	
15	20	12 March 2022	(Sweden) Falun	10 km F	(Norway) Therese Johaug	(Sweden) Jonna Sundling	(United States) Jessie Diggins	(Russia) Natalya Nepryayeva	
		18 March 2022	(Russia) Tyumen	Sprint F	Cancelled due to the Russian invasion of Ukraine				
		19 March 2022	(Russia) Tyumen	10 km F Mass Start	Cancelled due to the Russian invasion of Ukraine				
		20 March 2022	(Russia) Tyumen	10 km C Pursuit	Cancelled due to the Russian invasion of Ukraine				
	2021–22 World Cup Finals (18–20 March 2022)				Cancelled due to the Russian invasion of Ukraine				

=== Women's relay ===
Key: C – Classic / F – Freestyle
WC	Date	Place	Discipline	Winner	Second	Third	Leader	Ref.
1	5 December 2021	(Norway) Lillehammer	4 × 5 km Relay C/F	Russia I Yuliya Stupak; Natalya Nepryayeva; Tatiana Sorina; Veronika Stepanova	Sweden I Emma Ribom; Frida Karlsson; Ebba Andersson; Moa Olsson	Norway I Tiril Udnes Weng; Heidi Weng; Therese Johaug; Helene Marie Fossesholm	Sweden	
2	19 December 2021	(Germany) Dresden	Team Sprint F	Sweden I Jonna Sundling; Maja Dahlqvist	United States I Jessie Diggins; Julia Kern	Slovenia I Eva Urevc; Anamarija Lampič	Sweden	
2022 Winter Olympics (12 February)

=== Standings ===
==== Overall ====
Rank	after all 23 events	Points
	(Russia) Natalya Nepryayeva	973
2.	(United States) Jessie Diggins	793
3.	(Sweden) Ebba Andersson	772
4.	(Finland) Krista Pärmäkoski	763
5.	(Norway) Therese Johaug	735
6.	(Norway) Heidi Weng	704
7.	(Finland) Kerttu Niskanen	695
8.	(Slovenia) Anamarija Lampič	683
9.	(Sweden) Jonna Sundling	649
10.	(Sweden) Maja Dahlqvist	645

==== Distance ====
Rank	after all 12 events	Points
	(Norway) Therese Johaug	735
2.	(Sweden) Frida Karlsson	480
3.	(Finland) Krista Pärmäkoski	475
4.	(Sweden) Ebba Andersson	452
5.	(Norway) Heidi Weng	424
6.	(Finland) Kerttu Niskanen	417
7.	(Germany) Katharina Hennig	376
8.	(Russia) Natalya Nepryayeva	365
9.	(United States) Jessie Diggins	314
10.	(United States) Rosie Brennan	311

==== Sprint ====
Rank	after all 10 events	Points
	(Sweden) Maja Dahlqvist	638
2.	(Slovenia) Anamarija Lampič	506
3.	(Sweden) Jonna Sundling	442
4.	(United States) Jessie Diggins	351
5.	(Switzerland) Nadine Fähndrich	329
6.	(Sweden) Johanna Hagström	322
7.	(Norway) Maiken Caspersen Falla	236
8.	(United States) Julia Kern	235
9.	(Norway) Mathilde Myhrvold	229
10.	(Russia) Natalya Nepryayeva	208

==== U23 ====
Rank	after all 23 events	Points
Green bib	(Sweden) Frida Karlsson	526
2.	(Norway) Helene Marie Fossesholm	114
3.	(Norway) Kristine Stavås Skistad	92
4.	(Sweden) Louise Lindström	86
5.	(United States) Sophia Laukli	84
6.	(United States) Novie McCabe	66
7.	(Russia) Veronika Stepanova	65
8.	(Finland) Jasmin Kähärä	59
9.	(Latvia) Patrīcija Eiduka	43
10.	(France) Flora Dolci	34

==== Bonus Ranking ====
Rank	after all 4 events	Points
1.	(Finland) Kerttu Niskanen	102
2.	(Norway) Mathilde Myhrvold	98
3.	(Slovenia) Anamarija Lampič	94
4.	(Russia) Natalya Nepryayeva	88
5.	(Sweden) Johanna Hagström	84
6.	(Finland) Krista Pärmäkoski	70
7.	(United States) Jessie Diggins	66
8.	(Germany) Coletta Rydzek	64
9.	(Norway) Therese Johaug	60
10.	(Russia) Tatiana Sorina	51

==== Prize money ====
Rank	after all 33 payouts	CHF
1.	(Russia) Natalya Nepryayeva	119 450
2.	(Norway) Therese Johaug	87 000
3.	(United States) Jessie Diggins	76 375
4.	(Sweden) Jonna Sundling	72 700
5.	(Sweden) Maja Dahlqvist	71 200
6.	(Sweden) Ebba Andersson	70 625
7.	(Finland) Krista Pärmäkoski	59 000
8.	(Norway) Heidi Weng	53 050
9.	(Sweden) Frida Karlsson	52 025
10.	(Finland) Kerttu Niskanen	39 075

== Mixed team ==
Key: C – Classic / F – Freestyle
WC	Date	Place	Discipline	Winner	Second	Third	Leader	Ref.
1	13 March 2022	(Sweden) Falun	4 × 5 km Mixed; Relay F	United States I Rosie Brennan; Zak Ketterson; Scott Patterson; Jessie Diggins	Finland I Kerttu Niskanen; Perttu Hyvärinen; Iivo Niskanen; Krista Pärmäkoski	Norway I Heidi Weng; Hans Christer Holund; Didrik Tønseth; Therese Johaug	Norway (men); Sweden (women)	
2	13 March 2022	(Sweden) Falun	Mixed; Team Sprint F	Sweden I Jonna Sundling; Calle Halfvarsson	Norway II Tiril Udnes Weng; Martin Løwstrøm Nyenget	Norway I Lotta Udnes Weng; Harald Østberg Amundsen	Norway (men); Sweden (women)	

== Nations Cup ==
=== Overall ===
Rank	after all 48 events	Points
	Norway	8207
2.	Sweden	5436
3.	Russia	4861
4.	Finland	4214
5.	United States	2874
6.	France	2566
7.	Germany	2449
8.	Italy	1901
9.	Switzerland	1737
10.	Slovenia	1082

=== Men ===
Rank	after all 25 events	Points
	Norway	4859
2.	Russia	2903
3.	France	1962
4.	Finland	1773
5.	Sweden	1454
6.	Italy	1221
7.	Germany	898
8.	Switzerland	896
9.	United States	677
10.	Canada	414

=== Women ===
Rank	after all 25 events	Points
	Sweden	3982
2.	Norway	3348
3.	Finland	2441
4.	United States	2197
5.	Russia	1958
6.	Germany	1551
7.	Slovenia	959
8.	Switzerland	841
9.	Italy	680
10.	France	604

== Points distribution ==
The table shows the number of points to win in every competition in the 2021/22 Cross-Country Skiing World Cup for men and women. Team Sprint and Relay used to count only for Nations Cup but in this season they also made an impact on individual standings, unless it is mixed competition for men and women. Starting this season bonus points will be counted for sprint qualifications.

Place	1	2	3	4	5	6	7	8	9	10	11	12	13	14	15	16	17	18	19	20	21	22	23	24	25	26	27	28	29	30	31 - 40	>40
Individual	100	80	60	50	45	40	36	32	29	26	24	22	20	18	16	15	14	13	12	11	10	9	8	7	6	5	4	3	2	1
Relay (Nations Cup)	200	160	120	100	90	80	72	64	58	52	48	44	40	36	32	30	28	26	24	22	20	18	16	14	12	10	8	6	4	2
Team Sprint (Nations Cup)	200	160	120	100	90	80	72	64	58	52	48	44	40	36	32	30	28	26	24	22	20	18	16	14	12	10	8	6	4	2
Tour de Ski	400	320	240	200	180	160	144	128	116	104	96	88	80	72	64	60	56	52	48	44	40	36	32	28	24	20	20	20	20	20	10	5
Stage Tour de Ski	50	46	43	40	37	34	32	30	28	26	24	22	20	18	16	15	14	13	12	11	10	9	8	7	6	5	4	3	2	1
Relay (Individual points)	25	20	15	12	11	10	9	8	7	6	5	4	3	2	1
Team Sprint (Individual points)	25	20	15	12	11	10	9	8	7	6	5	4	3	2	1
Bonus points (Mass Start checkpoints)	15	12	10	8	6	5	4	3	2	1
Sprint Qualifications	15	12	10	8	6	5	4	3	2	1

== Achievements ==
Only individual events.

First World Cup career victory

Men

- (Russia) Alexander Terentyev (22), in his 4th season – the WC 1 (Sprint C) in Ruka; also first podium
- (Norway) Håvard Solås Taugbøl (28), in his 9th season – the WC 8 (Sprint F) in Dresden; first podium was 2019–20 WC 5 (Sprint F) in Davos
- (France) Richard Jouve (27), in his 8th season – the WC 12 (Sprint C) in Drammen; first podium was 2014–15 WC 23 (Sprint F) in Lahti
- (Norway) Martin Løwstrøm Nyenget (29), in his 9th season – the WC 13 (50 km Mass Start C) in Oslo; first podium was 2019–20 WC 14 (15 km Pursuit C) in Östersund

Women

First World Cup podium

Men

- (Russia) Alexander Terentyev (22), in his 4th season – the WC 1 (Sprint C) in Ruka – 1st place
- (Norway) Thomas Helland Larsen (23), in his 3rd season – the WC 4 (Sprint F) in Lillehammer – 2nd place
- (China) Wang Qiang (28), in his 4th season – the WC 12 (Sprint C) in Drammen – 2nd place
- (Finland) Joni Mäki (27), in his 9th season – the WC 14 (Sprint C) in Falun – 2nd place
- (Germany) Friedrich Moch (21), in his 3rd season – the WC 9 (10 km Mass Start F) in Val di Fiemme – 3rd place
- (Sweden) William Poromaa (21), in his 4th season – the WC 11 (15 km C) in Lahti – 3rd place
- (Norway) Harald Østberg Amundsen (23), in his 4th season – the WC 15 (15 km F) in Falun – 3rd place

Women

- (Norway) Mathilde Myhrvold (23), in her 4th season – the WC 9 (Sprint F) in Lenzerheide – 2nd place
- (Norway) Tiril Udnes Weng (25), in her 8th season – the WC 4 (Sprint F) in Lillehammer – 3rd place
- (Finland) Johanna Matintalo (25), in her 7th season – the WC 9 (Sprint C) in Oberstdorf – 3rd place

Number of wins this season (in brackets are all-time wins)

Men

- (Norway) Johannes Høsflot Klæbo – 8 (48)
- (Finland) Iivo Niskanen – 3 (8)
- (Norway) Simen Hegstad Krüger – 2 (6)
- (France) Richard Jouve – 2 (2)
- (Russia) Alexander Bolshunov – 1 (28)
- (Norway) Sjur Røthe – 1 (6)
- (Norway) Didrik Tønseth – 1 (4)
- (Russia) Alexander Terentyev – 1 (1)
- (Norway) Håvard Solås Taugbøl – 1 (1)
- (Norway) Martin Løwstrøm Nyenget – 1 (1)

Women

- (Norway) Therese Johaug – 5 (82)
- (Sweden) Maja Dahlqvist – 4 (5)
- (Russia) Natalya Nepryayeva – 3 (6)
- (United States) Jessie Diggins – 2 (12)
- (Sweden) Jonna Sundling – 2 (5)
- (Sweden) Frida Karlsson – 2 (3)
- (Norway) Maiken Caspersen Falla – 1 (22)
- (Norway) Heidi Weng – 1 (13)
- (Finland) Kerttu Niskanen – 1 (3)

== Retirements ==
Men

- (France) Adrien Backscheider
- (Switzerland) Dario Cologna
- (France) Jean-Marc Gaillard
- (France) Baptiste Gros
- (Switzerland) Jovian Hediger
- (Switzerland) Ueli Schnider

Women

- (Italy) Elisa Brocard
- (Canada) Cendrine Browne
- (Norway) Maiken Caspersen Falla
- (Germany) Antonia Fräbel (Note: Change of discipline - biathlon)
- (Switzerland) Laurien van der Graaff
- (United States) Hannah Halvorsen
- (Germany) Nadine Herrmann
- (Czech Republic) Petra Hynčicová
- (Sweden) Charlotte Kalla
- (Slovenia) Anamarija Lampič
- (United States) Katharine Ogden
- (United States) Caitlin Patterson
- (Germany) Julia Preusseger
- (Italy) Lucia Scardoni
- (Sweden) Evelina Settlin
- (Germany) Anne Winkler
