= Mathilde Myhrvold =

Norwegian cross-country skier (born 1998)

Personal information
- Nationality: Norway
- Born: 16 July 1998 (age 28) Gjøvik, Norway

Sport
- Sport: Skiing
- Club: Vind IL

World Cup career
- Seasons: 7 – (2019–present)
- Indiv. starts: 53
- Indiv. podiums: 3
- Indiv. wins: 0
- Team starts: 6
- Team podiums: 0
- Overall titles: 0 – (23rd in 2022)
- Discipline titles: 0
- Updated on 14 December 2024

Mathilde Skjærdalen Myhrvold (born 16 July 1998) is a Norwegian cross-country skier.

== Career ==
She finished ninth in the individual sprint at the 2020 Nordic Junior World Ski Championships. She took her first World Cup podium in December 2021, in Lenzerheide Switzerland.

== Cross-country skiing results ==
All results are sourced from the International Ski Federation (FIS).

=== Olympic Games ===
Year	Age	10 km individual	15 km skiathlon	30 km mass start	Sprint	4 × 5 km relay	Team sprint
2022	23	44	—	—	21	—	—

=== World Cup ===
==== Season standings ====
Season	Age	Discipline standings				Ski Tour standings			
Season	Age	Overall	Distance	Sprint	U23	Nordic Opening	Tour de Ski	Ski Tour 2020	World Cup Final
2019	20	NC	—	NC	NC	—	—	—N/a	—
2020	21	76	—	46	17	—	—	—	—N/a
2021	22	65	92	41	13	29	—	—N/a	—N/a
2022	23	23	61	9	—N/a	—N/a	DNF	—N/a	—N/a
2023	24	39	117	14	—N/a	—N/a	DNF	—N/a	—N/a
2024	25	26	44	12	—N/a	—N/a	25	—N/a	—N/a
2025	26	34		8	—N/a	—N/a		—N/a	—N/a

==== Individual podiums ====
- 3 podiums – (1 WC, 2 SWC)

No.	Season	Date	Location	Race	Level	Place
1	2021–22	29 December 2021	Lenzerheide, Switzerland	1.5 km Sprint F	Stage World Cup	2nd
2	2022–23	6 January 2023	Val di Fiemme, Italy	1.3 km Sprint C	Stage World Cup	3rd
3	2024–25	14 December 2024	Davos, Switzerland	1.5 km Sprint F	World Cup	2nd
