= Thomas Helland Larsen =

Norwegian cross-country skier

Thomas Larsen
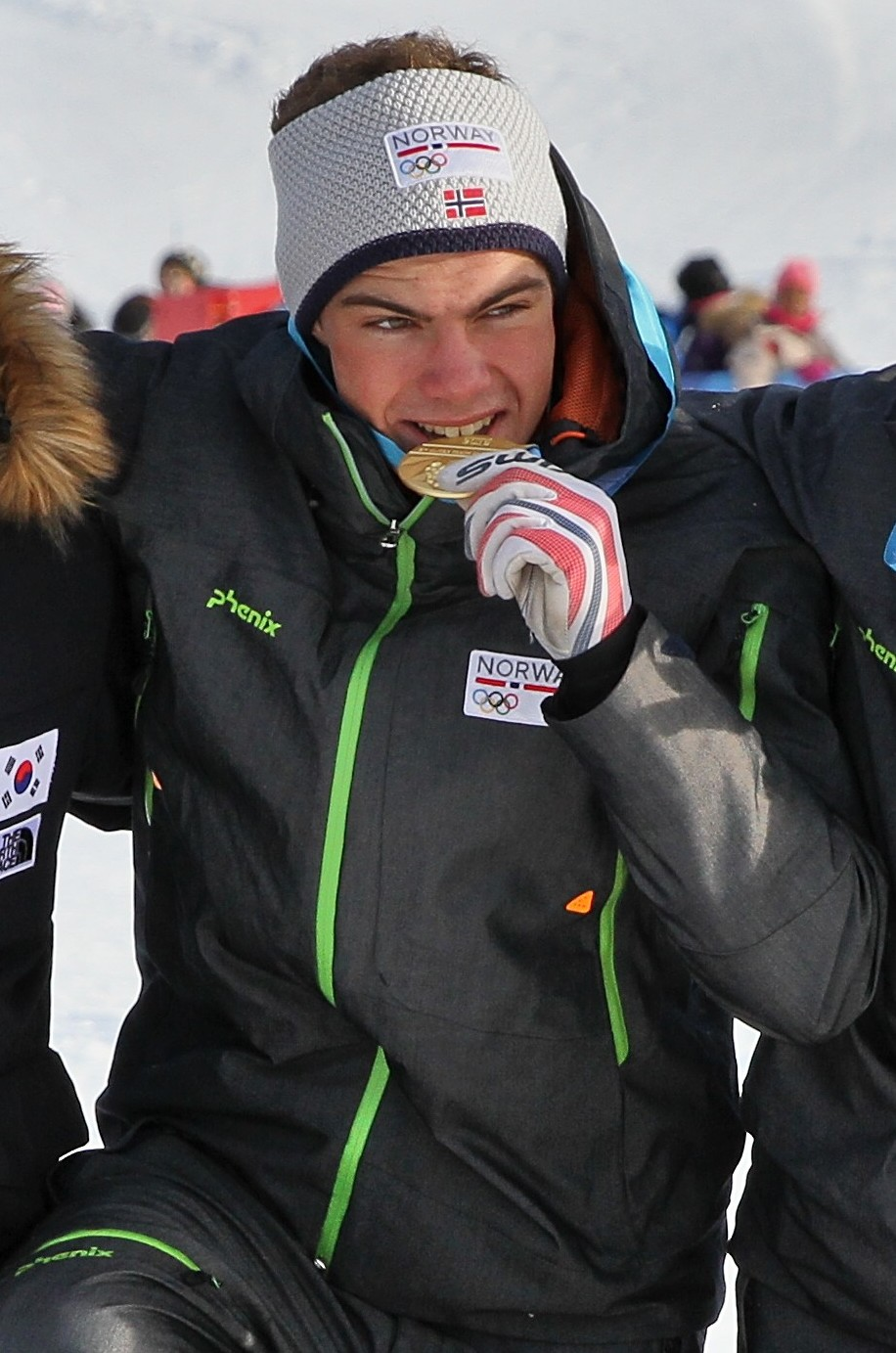

Personal information
- Full name: Thomas Helland Larsen
- Nationality: Norway
- Born: 20 April 1998 (age 28) Oslo, Norway
- Height: 181 cm (5 ft 11 in)

Sport
- Sport: Skiing
- Club: Fossum IF

World Cup career
- Seasons: 4 – (2020–present)
- Indiv. starts: 7
- Indiv. podiums: 1
- Indiv. wins: 0
- Team starts: 2
- Team podiums: 1
- Team wins: 1
- Overall titles: 0 – (42nd in 2022)
- Discipline titles: 0
Medal record
Men's cross-country skiing
Representing Norway
Junior World Championships
Gold medal – first place	2017 Park City	4 × 5 km relay
Silver medal – second place	2017 Park City	20 km skiathlon
- Updated on 28 March 2023

Thomas Helland Larsen (born 20 April 1998) is a Norwegian cross-country skier.

At the 2016 Winter Youth Olympics he finished fourth in the 10 kilometre, won the silver medal in the cross-country cross event and the gold medal in the sprint event. Competing at the 2017 and 2018 Junior World Championships, his biggest success was the 2017 event where he won a gold medal in the 4 × 5 kilometre relay and the silver medal in the 10 + 10 kilometre skiathlon.

He made his World Cup debut at the March 2020 sprint in Konnerud, also collecting his first World Cup points with a 26th place. He improved to 21st in February 2021 in Ulricehamn. His definitive breakthrough came in December 2021 in Lillehammer, where he finished second in the sprint.

He represents the sports club Fossum IF.

== Cross-country skiing results ==
All results are sourced from the International Ski Federation (FIS).

=== World Cup ===
==== Season standings ====
Season	Age	Discipline standings				Ski Tour standings		
Season	Age	Overall	Distance	Sprint	U23	Nordic Opening	Tour de Ski	Ski Tour 2020
2020	21	136	—	82	12	—	—	—
2021	22	105	—	63	15	—	—	—N/a
2022	23	42	—	17	—N/a	—N/a	—	—N/a
2023	24	144	—	80	—N/a	—N/a	—	—N/a

==== Individual podiums ====
- 1 podium – (1 WC)

No.	Season	Date	Location	Race	Level	Place
1	2021–22	3 December 2021	Lillehammer, Norway	1.6 km Sprint F	World Cup	2nd

==== Team podiums ====
- 1 victory – (1 TS)
- 1 podium – (1 TS)

No.	Season	Date	Location	Race	Level	Place	Teammate
1	2021–22	19 December 2021	Dresden, Germany	12 × 0.65 km Team Sprint F	World Cup	1st	Northug
