= Rukatunturi =

Mountain in Kuusamo, Finland

Coordinates: 66°11′46″N 029°06′45″E

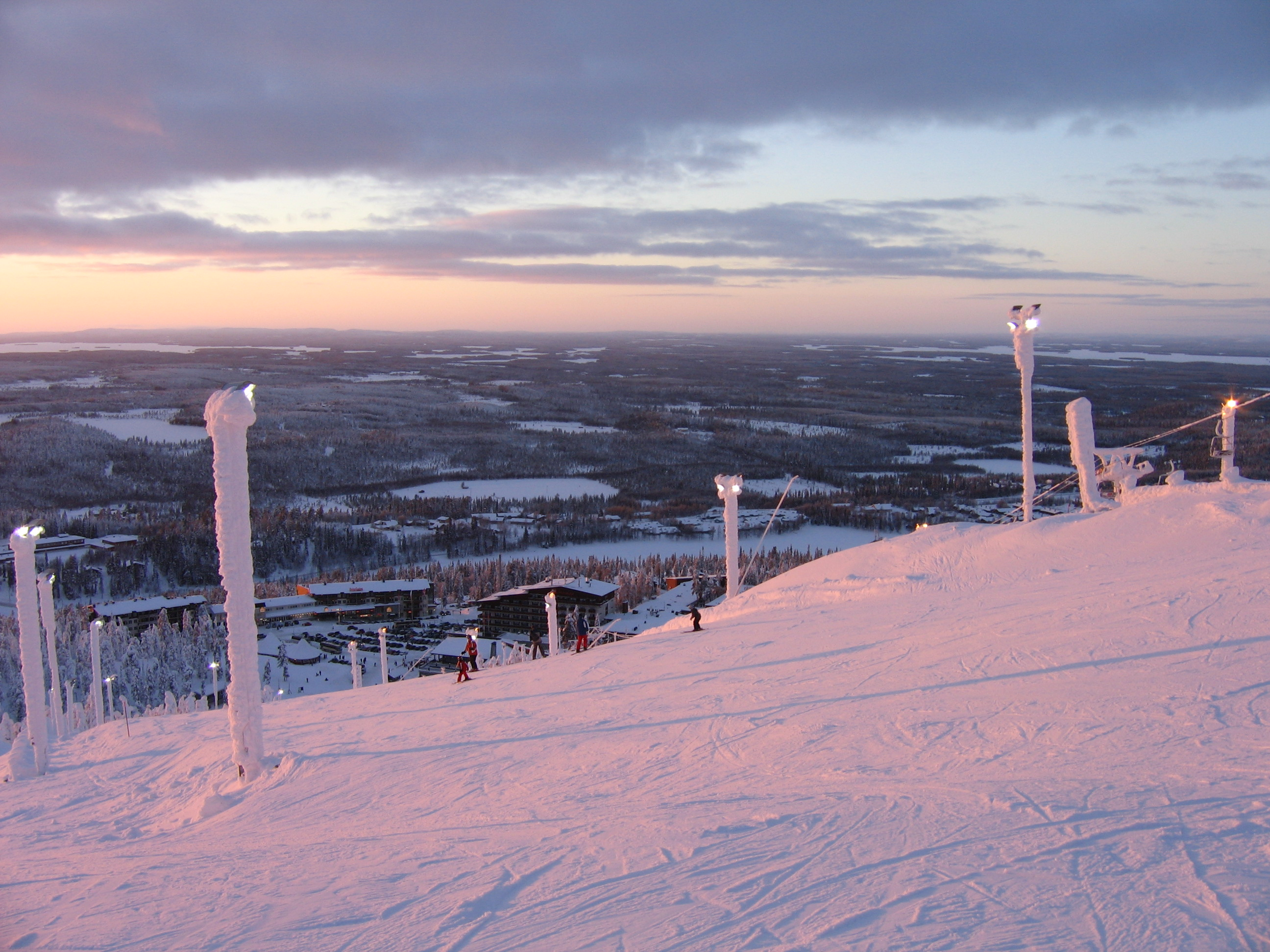
A view from Rukatunturi

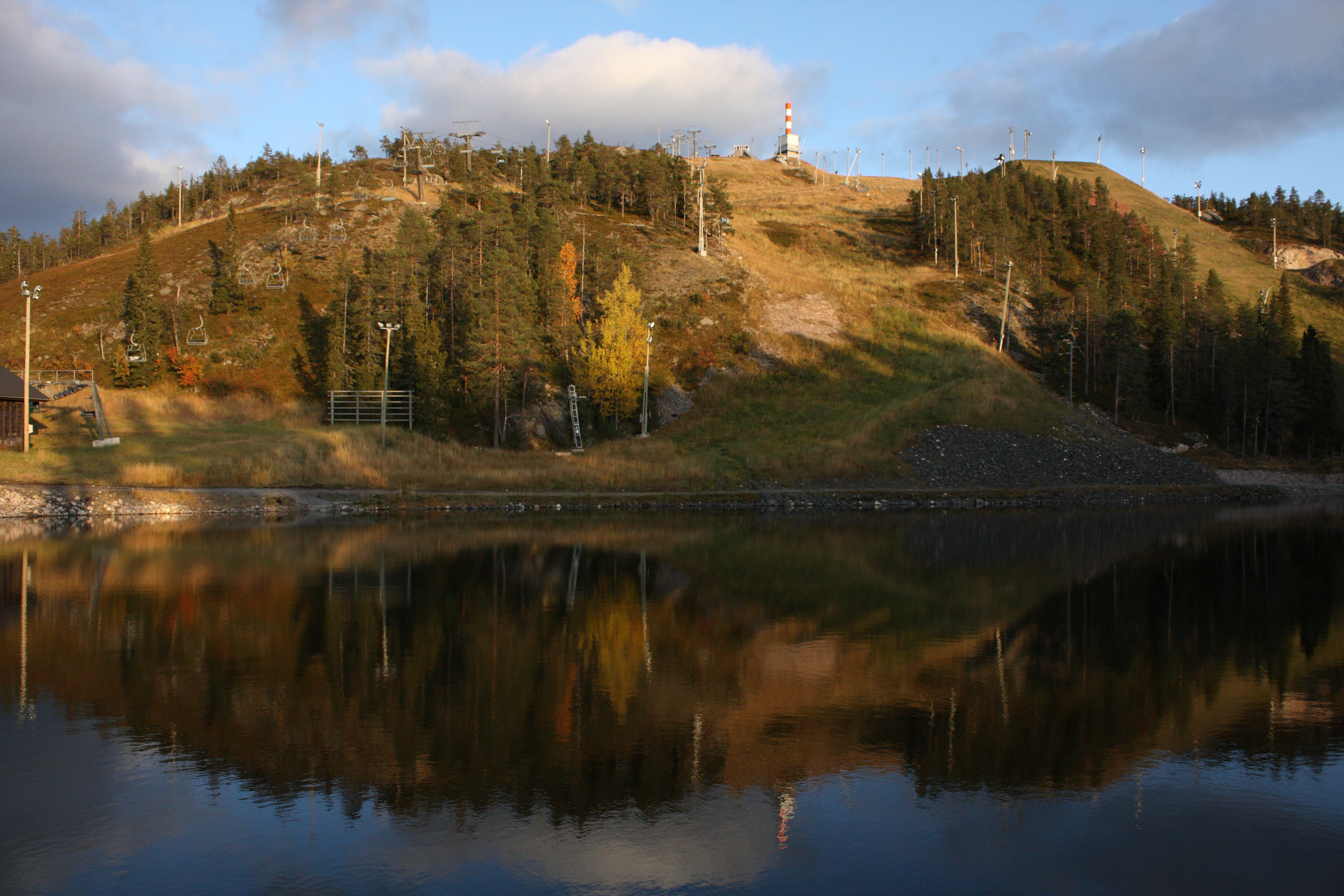
Front slopes in October 2009.

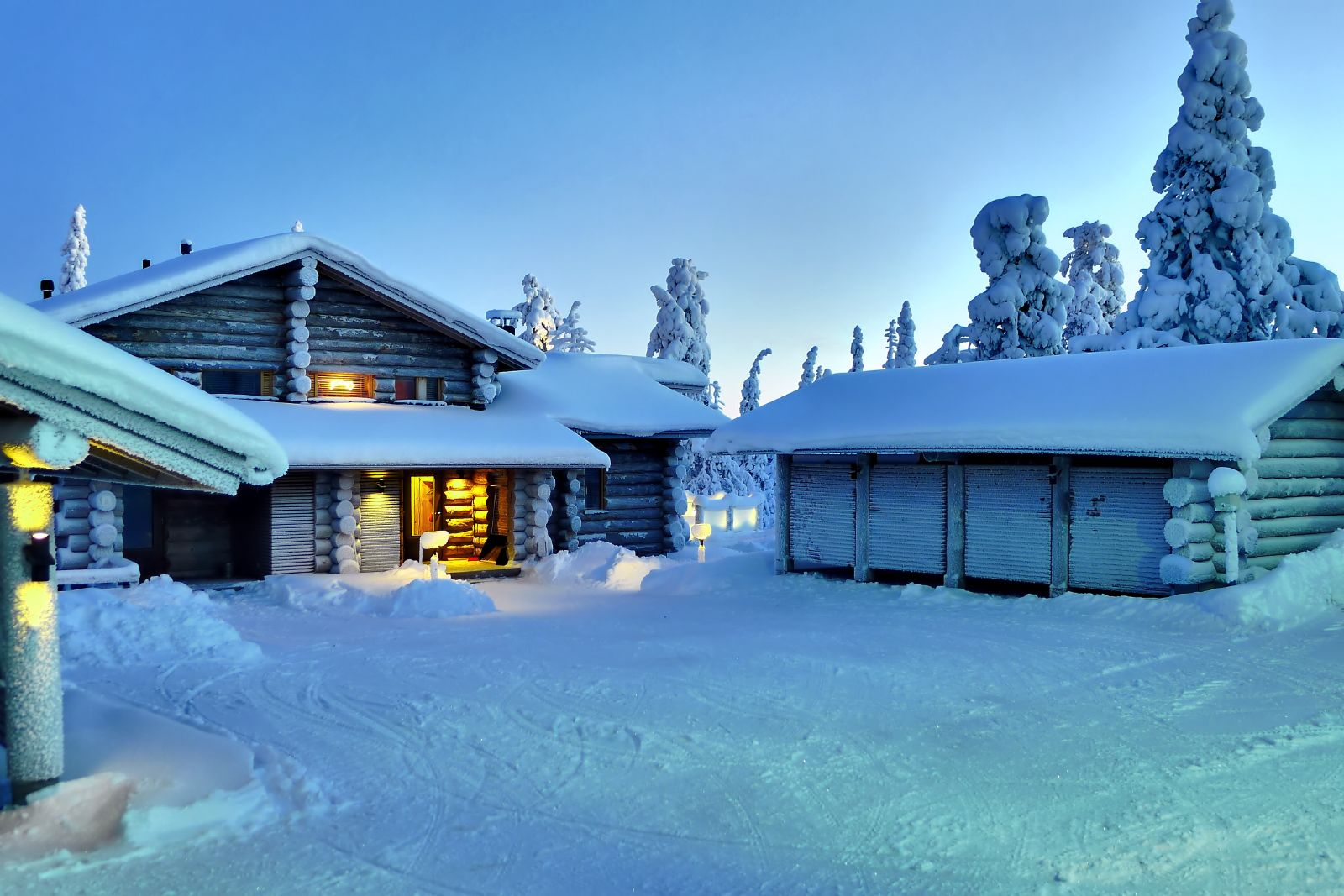
A cottage in Ruka.

Rukatunturi (Finnish: Ruka) is a 492 metres (1,614 ft) high fell and a ski resort in Kuusamo, Finland. Apart from downhill skiing, there are over 500 km of cross-country skiing tracks. Also snowmobiles can be rented to enjoy some of the area's 600 km of snowmobile routes (of which 100 km are safari organizers' private routes). Ruka is also the southern end of the Karhunkierros hiking trail. The total of trails in Ruka and Kuusamo area is: 160 km of hiking trails, 605 km of biking routes, 350 km of classified paddling routes (including class 1–4 whitewater paddling) and 100 km of boating routes.

In winter 1954, the first slope, now called "Eturinne" ("Front Slope"), was opened. The current number of slopes is 41, operated with 21 ski lifts (three high-speed detachable chair with bubble and one gondola). There's effective snowmaking on all runs by almost 90 snowguns and 5 groomers.

Ruka has turned into a diverse tourist centre whose year-round usage is growing. In winter there are for example Nordic skiing World Cup competitions. FIS Nordic Combined season starts yearly in Ruka (Nordic Opening). There are also annual national competitions in alpine and freestyle skiing, and there have been international competitions in these sports, too.

Ruka has one of the longest ski seasons in Europe, starting usually in October and ending in June. During the main season ski lifts are open daily from 9.30 am until 7 pm. There's also night skiing on Fridays 7–11 pm (usually from December until mid-April).

== Ruka through the seasons ==
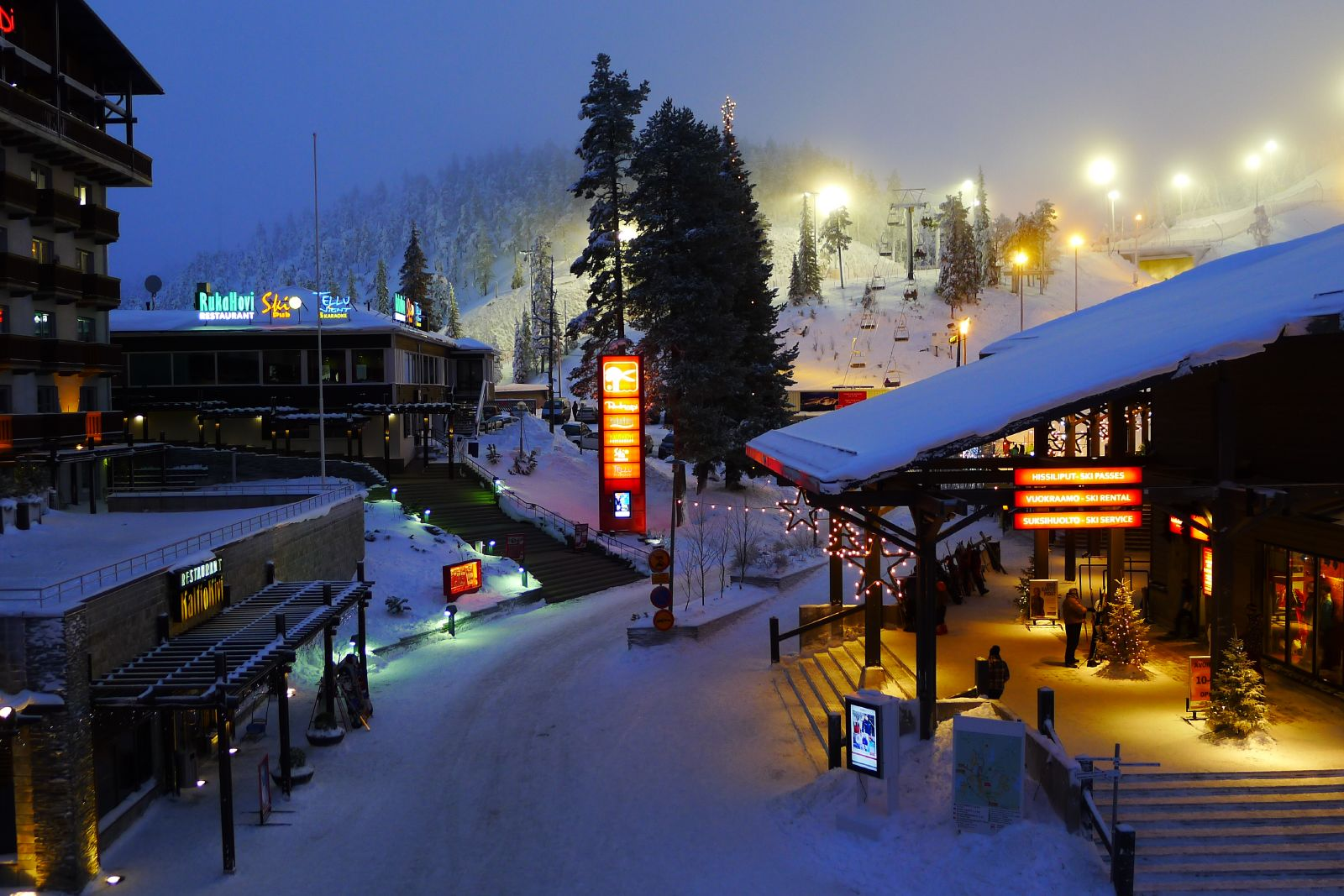
Ruka village

In the winter months Ruka is a ski resort and activity centre with 41 ski slopes, 36 flood lit slopes for night skiing, over 500 km of cross country ski tracks, a border cross park and street as well as other activities such as snowmobiling, snowshoeing, reindeer sleigh rides, husky sled rides, visits to Santa's home, ice carting, ice fishing, ice climbing and Finnish sauna. The winter season usually runs from the beginning of December until May.

In the summer the snow melts and Ruka becomes a hiking and mountain biking centre with the Oulanka National Park and world-famous Karhunkierros, 80 km hiking trail, on its doorstep. Other activities on offer are gravel biking, canoeing, white water rafting, fishing, birdwatching, bear watching.

In 2025, a fell roller coaster was opened as a new summer activity; the ride, which takes a few minutes to complete, can accommodate two passengers per trolley and has a maximum speed of 40km/h. The world's northernmost fell roller coaster has become very popular; within six months of its opening, over 50,000 tickets have been sold for the roller coaster, and on Ruka Centre's own social media channels alone, a video of a winter ride on the Ruka Coaster has become the company's most-watched video of all time, garnering 3.4 million views around the world.

In the autumn the forests of Ruka and Kuusamo change colours, with not just the trees but the forest floor, which is carpeted in plants, turning reds, oranges and yellows.

== Ruka Pedestrian Village ==
In November 2010 the Ruka Pedestrian Village became ready. Ruka now has an underground car park for 320 vehicles. The car park is heated in winters. Now it is possible to walk from the hotels to the slopes without crossing any roads.

== Climate ==
Climate data for Kuusamo Rukatunturi, (1993-2023 normals, extremes 1993-present)
Month	Jan	Feb	Mar	Apr	May	Jun	Jul	Aug	Sep	Oct	Nov	Dec	Year
Record high °C (°F)	2.6 (36.7)	2.4 (36.3)	6.4 (43.5)	13.6 (56.5)	25.3 (77.5)	28.2 (82.8)	28.0 (82.4)	27.5 (81.5)	21.2 (70.2)	13.3 (55.9)	6.7 (44.1)	3.1 (37.6)	28.2 (82.8)
Daily mean °C (°F)	−10.5 (13.1)	−10.8 (12.6)	−7.1 (19.2)	−1.6 (29.1)	4.0 (39.2)	10.5 (50.9)	13.9 (57.0)	11.4 (52.5)	6.1 (43.0)	−0.4 (31.3)	−5.2 (22.6)	−8.3 (17.1)	−0.2 (31.6)
Record low °C (°F)	−34.8 (−30.6)	−30.0 (−22.0)	−21.2 (−6.2)	−17.2 (1.0)	−10.4 (13.3)	−2.7 (27.1)	0.2 (32.4)	−0.6 (30.9)	−5.1 (22.8)	−16.2 (2.8)	−19.9 (−3.8)	−27.5 (−17.5)	−34.8 (−30.6)
Source 1: FMI
Source 2: FMI open data

== See also ==
- Levi, Finland
- Rukatunturi ski jumping hill
