= 2024–25 Tour de Ski =

19th edition of the Tour de Ski

Tour de Ski
2024–25 FIS Cross-Country World Cup

Ski tour details
- Venue(s): Toblach, Italy; Val di Fiemme, Italy
- Dates: 28 December 2024 – 5 January 2025
- Stages: 7

Results
Men
Jersey awarded to the men's overall winner	Winner	Johannes Høsflot Klæbo (NOR)
	Second	Mika Vermeulen (AUT)
	Third	Hugo Lapalus (FRA)
Jersey awarded to the men's sprint classification winner	Sprint	Johannes Høsflot Klæbo (NOR)
Jersey awarded to the men's climbing classification winner	Climbing	Hugo Lapalus (FRA)
Women
Jersey awarded to the women's overall winner	Winner	Therese Johaug (NOR)
	Second	Astrid Øyre Slind (NOR)
	Third	Jessie Diggins (USA)
Jersey awarded to the women's sprint classification winner	Sprint	Nadine Fähndrich (SUI)
Jersey awarded to the women's climbing classification winner	Climbing	Therese Johaug (NOR)

The 2024–25 Tour de Ski was the 19th edition of the Tour de Ski and part of the 2024–25 FIS Cross-Country World Cup. The World Cup stage event began in Toblach, Italy on 28 December 2024 and concluded with the traditional Final Climb stage in Val di Fiemme, Italy, on 5 January 2025. The tour started in Toblach for the third time.

Harald Østberg Amundsen from Norway and Jessie Diggins from United States are the winners of previous edition.

Russia and Belarus are not allowed to compete after suspension by FIS council for this World Cup season due to Russian invasion of Ukraine.

The winners of the Tour are Therese Johaug on women side and Johannes Høsflot Klæbo won men's general classification. Both Norwegians claimed the Tour de Ski title for the fourth time.

== Schedule ==
Stage	Venue	Date	Event	Technique	Distance	Start time (CET)	
Stage	Venue	Date	Event	Technique	Distance	Women	Men
1	(Italy) Toblach	28 December 2024	Sprint	Free	1.4 km	14:30	14:30
2	(Italy) Toblach	29 December 2024	Distance, mass start	Classic	15 km	12:30	14:45
3	(Italy) Toblach	31 December 2024	Distance, interval start	Free	20 km	14:45	11:30
4	(Italy) Toblach	1 January 2025	Distance, pursuit	Classic	15 km	12:30	10:30
5	(Italy) Val di Fiemme	3 January 2025	Sprint	Classic	1.2 km	14:45	14:45
6	(Italy) Val di Fiemme	4 January 2025	Distance, mass start	Skiathlon	20 km	15:30	11:00
7	(Italy) Val di Fiemme	5 January 2025	Final Climb, mass start	Free	10 km	15:30	14:15

== Overall leadership ==
Three main individual classifications are contested in the 2024–25 Tour de Ski, as well as a team competition. The most important is the overall standings, calculated by adding each skier's finishing times on each stage. Time bonuses (time subtracted) are awarded at both sprint stages, where the winners are awarded 60 bonus seconds. The skier with the lowest cumulative time will be the overall winner of the Tour de Ski. For the second time in Tour history, the skier leading the overall standings will wear a gold bib.

Bonus seconds for the top 30 positions by type
Type		1	2	3	4	5	6	7	8	9	10	11	12	13–15	16–20	21–25	26–30
In finish
In finish	Sprint	60	54	48	46	44	42	32	30	28	26	24	22	10	8	6	4
In finish	Interval start	none															
In finish	Pursuit	none															
In finish	Mass start	none															

The second competition will be the sprints standings. The skiers who receive the highest number of points during the Tour win the sprint classification. The points available for each stage finish are determined by the stage's type. The leader is identified by a silver bib.

Sprint standings points for the top 10 positions by type
Type		1	2	3	4	5	6	7	8	9	10
In finish	Sprint	30	24	20	16	12	10	8	6	4	2
Intermediate sprint	Interval start (1st IT)	15	12	10	8	6	5	4	3	2	1
Intermediate sprint	Mass start	15	12	10	8	6	5	4	3	2	1

The third competition is the new competition called climbing standings. The skiers who receive the highest number of points on the top of the hills during the Tour win the climbing classification. The points available for each stage finish are determined by the stage's type. The leader is identified by a violet bib.

Climbing standings points for the top 10 positions by type
Type		1	2	3	4	5	6	7	8	9	10
In finish	Stage 7 (Alpe Cermis)	45	35	30	26	22	18	14	10	6	3
Intermediate sprint	Interval start	30	24	20	16	12	10	8	6	4	2
Intermediate sprint	Mass start	5	4	3	2	1					

The final competition is a team competition. This is calculated using the finishing times of the best two skiers of both genders per team on each stage; the leading team is the team with the lowest cumulative time.

Classification leadership by stage
Stage	Men				Women			
Stage	Winner	Overall standings	Sprint standings	Climbing standings	Winner	Overall standings	Sprint standings	Climbing standings
1	Johannes Høsflot Klæbo	Johannes Høsflot Klæbo	Johannes Høsflot Klæbo	–	Jessie Diggins	Jessie Diggins	Jessie Diggins	–
2	Johannes Høsflot Klæbo	Johannes Høsflot Klæbo	Johannes Høsflot Klæbo	Harald Østberg Amundsen	Jessie Diggins	Jessie Diggins	Jasmi Joensuu	Therese Johaug
3	Harald Østberg Amundsen	Johannes Høsflot Klæbo	Johannes Høsflot Klæbo	Harald Østberg Amundsen	Astrid Øyre Slind	Jessie Diggins	Jasmi Joensuu	Therese Johaug
4	Harald Østberg Amundsen	Johannes Høsflot Klæbo	Johannes Høsflot Klæbo	Harald Østberg Amundsen	Astrid Øyre Slind	Astrid Øyre Slind	Jasmi Joensuu	Therese Johaug
5	Johannes Høsflot Klæbo	Johannes Høsflot Klæbo	Johannes Høsflot Klæbo	Andrew Musgrave	Nadine Fähndrich	Astrid Øyre Slind	Nadine Fähndrich	Therese Johaug
6	Johannes Høsflot Klæbo	Johannes Høsflot Klæbo	Johannes Høsflot Klæbo	Hugo Lapalus	Therese Johaug	Therese Johaug	Nadine Fähndrich	Therese Johaug
7	Simen Hegstad Krüger	Johannes Høsflot Klæbo	Johannes Høsflot Klæbo	Hugo Lapalus	Therese Johaug	Therese Johaug	Nadine Fähndrich	Therese Johaug
Final		Johannes Høsflot Klæbo	Johannes Høsflot Klæbo	Hugo Lapalus	Final	Therese Johaug	Nadine Fähndrich	Therese Johaug

== Final standings ==
Legend
Denotes the leader of the Overall standings	Denotes the leader of the Sprint standings	Denotes the leader of the Climbing standings

=== Overall standings ===
==== Men ====
Final overall standings (1–10)
Rank	Name	Time
1	Johannes Høsflot Klæbo (NOR)	3:24:17.3
2	Mika Vermeulen (AUT)	+1:23.1
3	Hugo Lapalus (FRA)	+1:43.7
4	Federico Pellegrino (ITA)	+2:13.3
5	Håvard Moseby (NOR)	+2:27.2
6	Friedrich Moch (GER)	+2:33.0
7	Erik Valnes (NOR)	+2:49.2
8	Mathis Desloges (FRA)	+2:54.0
9	Edvin Anger (SWE)	+2:57.6
10	Jan Thomas Jenssen (NOR)	+3:07.5

Final overall standings (11–44)
Rank	Name	Time
11	Andreas Fjorden Ree (NOR)	+3:39.6
12	Andrew Musgrave (GBR)	+3:46.4
13	William Poromaa (SWE)	+3:48.0
14	Iver Tildheim Andersen (NOR)	+3:56.0
15	Ben Ogden (USA)	+4:23.2
16	Elia Barp (ITA)	+4:32.5
17	Martino Carollo (ITA)	+4:33.2
18	Antoine Cyr (CAN)	+4:56.6
19	Arsi Ruuskanen (FIN)	+5:03.1
20	Irineu Esteve Altimiras (AND)	+5:47.2
21	Zanden McMullen (USA)	+5:54.9
22	Simen Hegstad Krüger (NOR)	+5:56.3
23	Michal Novák (CZE)	+6:14.3
24	Alvar Johannes Alev (EST)	+6:37.8
25	Jens Burman (SWE)	+6:48.2
26	Paolo Ventura (ITA)	+7:07.0
27	Naoto Baba (JPN)	+7:20.9
28	Thomas Maloney Westgård (IRL)	+7:28.6
29	Simone Daprà (ITA)	+8:08.6
30	Beda Klee (SUI)	+8:19.3
31	Olivier Léveillé (CAN)	+8:21.1
32	Giovanni Ticco (ITA)	+8:45.2
33	Dominik Bury (POL)	+9:01.6
34	Gustaf Berglund (SWE)	+9:50.0
35	Lauri Vuorinen (FIN)	+10:02.9
36	Lorenzo Romano (ITA)	+10:35.3
37	Ryo Hirose (JPN)	+10:50.1
38	Truls Gisselman (SWE)	+10:51.5
39	Andrew Young (GBR)	+10:53.4
40	Martin Himma (EST)	+11:29.7
41	Adam Fellner (CZE)	+11:39.6
42	Oskar Svensson (SWE)	+12:11.5
43	Martin Coradazzi (ITA)	+12:13.2
44	Janosch Brugger (GER)	+12:20.1

==== Women ====
Final overall standings (1–10)
Rank	Name	Time
1	Therese Johaug (NOR)	3:46:59.0
2	Astrid Øyre Slind (NOR)	+47.5
3	Jessie Diggins (USA)	+2:41.3
4	Kerttu Niskanen (FIN)	+3:21.9
5	Heidi Weng (NOR)	+4:07.0
6	Ebba Andersson (SWE)	+4:56.4
7	Teresa Stadlober (AUT)	+5:03.0
8	Victoria Carl (GER)	+7:02.0
9	Krista Pärmäkoski (FIN)	+7:03.9
10	Kristin Austgulen Fosnæs (NOR)	+7:19.8

Final overall standings (11–31)
Rank	Name	Time
11	Nora Sanness (NOR)	+7:38.1
12	Silje Theodorsen (NOR)	+8:19.5
13	Pia Fink (GER)	+8:54.2
14	Moa Ilar (SWE)	+10:03.4
15	Jasmi Joensuu (FIN)	+10:27.7
16	Katherine Stewart-Jones (CAN)	+10:31.1
17	Julia Kern (USA)	+11:53.2
18	Linn Svahn (SWE)	+11:58.8
19	Laura Gimmler (GER)	+12:21.1
20	Anna Comarella (ITA)	+12:45.6
21	Sophia Laukli (USA)	+13:19.4
22	Caterina Ganz (ITA)	+13:23.2
23	Kateřina Janatová (CZE)	+13:37.4
24	Nadine Fähndrich (SUI)	+14:27.9
25	Helen Hoffmann (GER)	+15:32.6
26	Anja Weber (SUI)	+15:43.2
27	Jasmin Kähärä (FIN)	+15:57.2
28	Liliane Gagnon (CAN)	+18:31.8
29	Anja Mandeljc (SLO)	+19:54.0
30	Katharina Brudermann (AUT)	+20:42.5
31	Barbora Havlíčková (CZE)	+27:25.0

=== Sprint standings ===
==== Men ====
Final sprint standings (1–10)
Rank	Name	Points
1	Johannes Høsflot Klæbo (NOR)	94
2	Edvin Anger (SWE)	48
3	Janik Riebli (SUI)	45
4	Federico Pellegrino (ITA)	41
5	Erik Valnes (NOR)	34
6	Marcus Grate (SWE)	20
7	Ben Ogden (USA)	20
8	Håvard Moseby (NOR)	16
9	Lauri Vuorinen (FIN)	16
10	Mika Vermeulen (AUT)	12

==== Women ====
Final sprint standings (1–10)
Rank	Name	Points
1	Nadine Fähndrich (SUI)	80
2	Jasmi Joensuu (FIN)	62
3	Jessie Diggins (USA)	51
4	Heidi Weng (NOR)	41
5	Therese Johaug (NOR)	39
6	Kerttu Niskanen (FIN)	27
7	Astrid Øyre Slind (NOR)	26
8	Krista Pärmäkoski (FIN)	25
9	Linn Svahn (SWE)	24
10	Laura Gimmler (GER)	24

=== Climbing standings ===
==== Men ====
Final climbing standings (1–10)
Rank	Name	Points
1	Hugo Lapalus (FRA)	69
2	Simen Hegstad Krüger (NOR)	65
3	Mika Vermeulen (AUT)	64
4	Friedrich Moch (GER)	39
5	Andrew Musgrave (GBR)	26
6	Irineu Esteve Altimiras (AND)	26
7	Iver Tildheim Andersen (NOR)	22
8	Johannes Høsflot Klæbo (NOR)	18
9	Federico Pellegrino (ITA)	18
10	Andreas Fjorden Ree (NOR)	17

==== Women ====
Final climbing standings (1–10)
Rank	Name	Points
1	Therese Johaug (NOR)	114
2	Astrid Øyre Slind (NOR)	66
3	Kerttu Niskanen (FIN)	46
4	Heidi Weng (NOR)	42
5	Ebba Andersson (SWE)	42
6	Jessie Diggins (USA)	38
7	Nora Sanness (NOR)	35
8	Teresa Stadlober (AUT)	23
9	Victoria Carl (GER)	20
10	Krista Pärmäkoski (FIN)	11

=== Team standings ===
Final team standings
Rank	Nation	Time
1	Norway	14:17:43
2	Sweden	+21:55
3	Finland	+22:36
4	United States	+23:09
5	Germany	+31:22

== Stages ==
=== Stage 1 ===
28 December 2024, Toblach, Italy

- Bonus seconds to the 30 skiers that qualifies for the quarter-finals, distributed as following:
  - Final: 60–54–48–46–44–42
  - Semi-final: 32–30–28–26–24–22
  - Quarter-final: 10–10–10–8–8–8–8–8–6–6–6–6–6–4–4–4–4–4

Men – 1.4 km Sprint Free
Rank	Name	QT	Time	BS
1	Johannes Høsflot Klæbo (NOR)	2:29.68 (1)	2:32.34	60
2	Lucas Chanavat (FRA)	2:31.28 (2)	+0.42	54
3	Janik Riebli (SUI)	2:32.51 (3)	+0.49	48
4	Richard Jouve (FRA)	2:37.27 (23)	+7.10	46
5	Valerio Grond (SUI)	2:35.70 (12)	+13.41	44
6	Ben Ogden (USA)	2:34.34 (5)	+13.52	42
7	Federico Pellegrino (ITA)	2:34.74 (9)	SF	32
8	Lauri Vuorinen (FIN)	2:36.63 (20)	SF	30
9	Edvin Anger (SWE)	2:33.18 (4)	SF	28
10	Gus Schumacher (USA)	2:36.32 (17)	SF	26

Women – 1.4 km Sprint Free
Rank	Name	QT	Time	BS
1	Jessie Diggins (USA)	2:55.70 (3)	2:59.62	60
2	Jasmi Joensuu (FIN)	2:56.72 (5)	+0.31	54
3	Nadine Fähndrich (SUI)	2:58.57 (9)	+0.47	48
4	Kristin Austgulen Fosnæs (NOR)	3:00.46 (22)	+0.56	46
5	Anja Weber (SUI)	3:00.13 (20)	+1.42	44
6	Maja Dahlqvist (SWE)	3:02.20 (26)	+45.78	42
7	Julie Myhre (NOR)	2:58.91 (13)	SF	32
8	Helene Marie Fossesholm (NOR)	2:57.16 (6)	SF	30
9	Kerttu Niskanen (FIN)	3:00.35 (21)	SF	28
10	Laura Gimmler (GER)	3:02.32 (27)	SF	26

=== Stage 2 ===
29 December 2024, Toblach, Italy

- No bonus seconds are awarded on this stage.

Men – 15 km Mass Start Classic
Rank	Name	Time
1	Johannes Høsflot Klæbo (NOR)	38:24.4
2	Erik Valnes (NOR)	+0.6
3	Håvard Moseby (NOR)	+1.2
4	Martin Løwstrøm Nyenget (NOR)	+2.1
5	Edvin Anger (SWE)	+2.3
6	Harald Østberg Amundsen (NOR)	+3.3
7	Gus Schumacher (USA)	+3.4
8	Federico Pellegrino (ITA)	+3.5
9	Antoine Cyr (CAN)	+3.5
10	William Poromaa (SWE)	+4.2

Women – 15 km Mass Start Classic
Rank	Name	Time
1	Jessie Diggins (USA)	42:23.6
2	Kerttu Niskanen (FIN)	+0.5
3	Astrid Øyre Slind (NOR)	+0.7
4	Heidi Weng (NOR)	+0.8
5	Silje Theodorsen (NOR)	+2.2
6	Therese Johaug (NOR)	+4.6
7	Ebba Andersson (SWE)	+7.1
8	Teresa Stadlober (AUT)	+23.7
9	Linn Svahn (SWE)	+44.0
10	Krista Pärmäkoski (FIN)	+44.4

=== Stage 3 ===
31 December 2024, Toblach, Italy

- No bonus seconds are awarded on this stage.

Men – 20 km Individual Free
Rank	Name	Time
1	Harald Østberg Amundsen (NOR)	44.05.3
2	Simen Hegstad Krüger (NOR)	+21.2
3	Andrew Musgrave (GBR)	+28.4
4	Andreas Fjorden Ree (NOR)	+37.4
5	Johannes Høsflot Klæbo (NOR)	+46.4
6	Jan Thomas Jenssen (NOR)	+48.3
7	Hugo Lapalus (FRA)	+50.5
8	Mathis Desloges (FRA)	+53.4
9	Ben Ogden (USA)	+59.4
10	Mika Vermeulen (AUT)	+59.6

Women – 20 km Individual Free
Rank	Name	Time
1	Astrid Øyre Slind (NOR)	48.54.9
2	Therese Johaug (NOR)	+3.3
3	Kerttu Niskanen (FIN)	+20.3
4	Victoria Carl (GER)	+27.8
4	Katherine Stewart-Jones (CAN)	+27.8
6	Jessie Diggins (USA)	+36.3
7	Heidi Weng (NOR)	+44.9
8	Moa Ilar (SWE)	+57.8
9	Kristin Austgulen Fosnæs (NOR)	+1:00.1
10	Sophia Laukli (USA)	+1:01.1

=== Stage 4 ===
1 January 2025, Toblach, Italy

- Start times based only on stage 3 results
- No bonus seconds are awarded on this stage.

Men – 15 km Pursuit Classic
Rank	Name	Time
1	Harald Østberg Amundsen (NOR)	35:18.9
2	Edvin Anger (SWE)	+2.5
3	Johannes Høsflot Klæbo (NOR)	+5.3
4	Hugo Lapalus (FRA)	+9.2
5	Mika Vermeulen (AUT)	+9.5
6	Simen Hegstad Krüger (NOR)	+12.8
7	Jan Thomas Jenssen (NOR)	+20.2
8	Mathis Desloges (FRA)	+21.1
9	Friedrich Moch (GER)	+22.1
10	Andreas Fjorden Ree (NOR)	+22.4

Women – 15 km Pursuit Classic
Rank	Name	Time
1	Astrid Øyre Slind (NOR)	38:39.9
2	Therese Johaug (NOR)	+0.2
3	Kerttu Niskanen (FIN)	+57.4
4	Victoria Carl (GER)	+1:36.6
5	Heidi Weng (NOR)	+2:08.1
6	Jessie Diggins (USA)	+2:08.5
7	Katherine Stewart-Jones (CAN)	+2:09.3
8	Jasmi Joensuu (FIN)	+2:49.2
9	Moa Ilar (SWE)	+2:49.6
10	Helene Marie Fossesholm (NOR)	+2:50.0

=== Stage 5 ===
3 January 2025, Val di Fiemme, Italy

- Bonus seconds to the 30 skiers that qualifies for the quarter-finals, distributed as following:
  - Final: 60–54–48–46–44–42
  - Semi-final: 32–30–28–26–24–22
  - Quarter-final: 10–10–10–8–8–8–8–8–6–6–6–6–6–4–4–4–4–4

Men – Sprint Classic
Rank	Name	QT	Time	BS
1	Johannes Høsflot Klæbo (NOR)	2:34.04 (1)	2:35.45	60
2	Even Northug (NOR)	2:38.90 (5)	+0.32	54
3	Marcus Grate (SWE)	2:43.51 (26)	+0.64	48
4	Federico Pellegrino (ITA)	2:39.54 (10)	+1.43	46
5	Håvard Moseby (NOR)	2:39.17 (8)	+2.97	44
6	Janik Riebli (SUI)	2:39.66 (12)	+17.76	42
7	Oskar Svensson (SWE)	2:42.65 (20)	SF	32
8	Erik Valnes (NOR)	2:34.97 (2)	SF	30
9	Niilo Moilanen (FIN)	2:35.44 (3)	SF	28
10	Emil Danielsson (SWE)	2:41.01 (16)	SF	26

Women – Sprint Classic
Rank	Name	QT	Time	BS
1	Nadine Fähndrich (SUI)	3:02.21 (5)	2:57.63	60
2	Linn Svahn (SWE)	3:02.13 (4)	+0.04	54
3	Heidi Weng (NOR)	3:05.96 (11)	+0.53	48
4	Jasmin Kähärä (FIN)	3:05.30 (10)	+0.82	46
5	Laura Gimmler (GER)	3:03.27 (8)	+1.03	44
6	Lotta Udnes Weng (NOR)	3:06.05 (12)	+1.97	42
7	Jasmi Joensuu (FIN)	2:59.11 (1)	SF	32
8	Nicole Monsorno (ITA)	3:01.22 (2)	SF	30
9	Julie Myhre (NOR)	3:04.32 (9)	SF	28
10	Anja Weber (SUI)	3:06.07 (14)	SF	26

=== Stage 6 ===
4 January 2025, Val di Fiemme, Italy

- No bonus seconds are awarded on this stage.

Men – 20 km Skiathlon
Rank	Name	Time
1	Johannes Høsflot Klæbo (NOR)	49:29.0
2	Federico Pellegrino (ITA)	+2.4
3	Jan Thomas Jenssen (NOR)	+3.9
4	Håvard Moseby (NOR)	+4.6
5	Mika Vermeulen (AUT)	+5.1
6	Friedrich Moch (GER)	+5.2
7	Erik Valnes (NOR)	+7.1
8	Hugo Lapalus (FRA)	+8.9
9	Andreas Fjorden Ree (NOR)	+8.9
10	Michal Novák (CZE)	+9.8

Women – 20 km Skiathlon
Rank	Name	Time
1	Therese Johaug (NOR)	54:53.3
2	Teresa Stadlober (AUT)	+30.6
3	Astrid Øyre Slind (NOR)	+30.6
4	Ebba Andersson (SWE)	+30.7
5	Jessie Diggins (USA)	+55.0
6	Kerttu Niskanen (FIN)	+2:06.2
7	Julia Kern (USA)	+2:10.8
8	Kristin Austgulen Fosnæs (NOR)	+2:16.8
9	Krista Pärmäkoski (FIN)	+2:19.3
10	Heidi Weng (NOR)	+2:20.6

=== Stage 7 ===
5 January 2025, Val di Fiemme, Italy

- No bonus seconds are awarded on this stage.

Men – 10 km Final Climb Mass Start Free
Rank	Name	Time
1	Simen Hegstad Krüger (NOR)	32:39.6
2	Mika Vermeulen (AUT)	+7.8
3	Friedrich Moch (GER)	+10.7
4	Hugo Lapalus (FRA)	+13.4
5	Irineu Esteve Altimiras (AND)	+20.9
6	Iver Tildheim Andersen (NOR)	+24.7
7	Federico Pellegrino (ITA)	+31.0
8	Jens Burman (SWE)	+34.9
9	Naoto Baba (JPN)	+42.6
10	Lorenzo Romano (ITA)	+47.0

Women – 10 km Final Climb Mass Start Free
Rank	Name	Time
1	Therese Johaug (NOR)	35:59.0
2	Astrid Øyre Slind (NOR)	+25.5
3	Heidi Weng (NOR)	+28.0
4	Nora Sanness (NOR)	+31.1
5	Ebba Andersson (SWE)	+44.4
6	Jessie Diggins (USA)	+54.3
7	Kerttu Niskanen (FIN)	+54.9
8	Teresa Stadlober (AUT)	+1:18.0
9	Kristin Austgulen Fosnæs (NOR)	+1:25.8
10	Krista Pärmäkoski (FIN)	+1:26.9

== World Cup points distribution ==
The table shows the number of 2024–25 FIS Cross-Country World Cup points to win in the 2024–25 Tour de Ski for men and women.

Place	1	2	3	4	5	6	7	8	9	10	11	12	13	14	15	16	17	18	19	20	21	22	23	24	25	26	27	28	29	30	31	32	33	34	35	36	37	38	39	40	41	42	43	44	45	46	47	48	49	50
Overall Standings	300	285	270	255	240	225	216	207	198	189	180	174	168	162	156	150	144	138	132	126	120	114	108	102	96	90	84	78	72	66	60	57	54	51	48	45	42	39	36	33	30	27	24	21	18	15	12	9	6	3
Each Stage	50	47	44	41	38	35	32	30	28	26	24	22	20	18	16	15	14	13	12	11	10	9	8	7	6	5	4	3	2	1

== Sources ==
- Rules for the FIS Cross-Country World Cup Edition 2024/25 (PDF). International Ski Federation. 2024.
- FIS Cross-Country World Cup 2024/25 (PDF). International Ski Federation. 2024.
