= FIS Nordic World Ski Championships 2025 – Men's 50 kilometre freestyle =

Men's 50 kilometre freestyle at the FIS Nordic World Ski Championships 2025
- Venue: Granåsen Ski Centre
- Location: Trondheim, Norway
- Dates: 8 March
- Competitors: 75 from 33 nations
- Winning time: 1:57:47.1

Medalists
gold medal	Johannes Høsflot Klæbo	Norway
silver medal	William Poromaa	Sweden
bronze medal	Simen Hegstad Krüger	Norway

The Men's 50 kilometre freestyle competition at the FIS Nordic World Ski Championships 2025 was held on 8 March 2025.

== Results ==
The race was started at 11:30.

Rank	Bib	Athlete	Country	Time	Deficit
1st place, gold medalist(s)	1	Johannes Høsflot Klæbo	Norway	1:57:47.1	0.00
2nd place, silver medalist(s)	11	William Poromaa	Sweden	1:57:49.2	+2.1
3rd place, bronze medalist(s)	2	Simen Hegstad Krüger	Norway	1:57:55.6	+8.5
4	5	Martin Løwstrøm Nyenget	Norway	1:58:05.7	+18.6
5	4	Harald Østberg Amundsen	Norway	1:58:38.9	+51.8
6	12	Andrew Musgrave	Great Britain	1:59:48.3	+2:01.2
7	25	Remi Lindholm	Finland	1:59:50.8	+2:03.7
8	18	Gustaf Berglund	Sweden	2:01:17.1	+3:30.0
9	6	Mika Vermeulen	Austria	2:01:54.5	+4:07.4
10	22	Naoto Baba	Japan	2:02:11.3	+4:24.2
11	17	Michal Novák	Czech Republic	2:02:41.1	+4:54.0
12	14	Jens Burman	Sweden	2:03:17.7	+5:30.6
13	15	Thomas Maloney Westgaard	Ireland	2:04:07.0	+6:19.9
14	13	Arsi Ruuskanen	Finland	2:04:09.2	+6:22.1
15	9	Friedrich Moch	Germany	2:04:15.9	+6:28.8
16	3	Hugo Lapalus	France	2:04:51.8	+7:04.7
17	31	Markus Vuorela	Finland	2:05:13.5	+7:26.4
18	28	Jason Rüesch	Switzerland	2:05:25.2	+7:38.1
19	23	Alvar Johannes Alev	Estonia	2:05:26.3	+7:39.2
20	16	Jules Lapierre	France	2:05:39.1	+7:52.0
21	30	Victor Lovera	France	2:05:39.9	+7:52.8
22	44	Kevin Bolger	United States	2:06:34.4	+8:47.3
23	21	Truls Gisselman	Sweden	2:06:38.1	+8:51.0
24	32	Olivier Léveillé	Canada	2:06:41.0	+8:53.9
25	38	Dominik Bury	Poland	2:06:42.4	+8:55.3
26	10	Gus Schumacher	United States	2:06:45.1	+8:58.0
27	8	Pål Golberg	Norway	2:06:57.8	+9:10.7
28	24	Martino Carollo	Italy	2:07:42.3	+9:55.2
29	29	Simone Daprà	Italy	2:07:43.4	+9:56.3
30	52	Imanol Rojo	Spain	2:07:43.9	+9:56.8
31	41	Andrew Young	Great Britain	2:07:44.1	+9:57.0
32	20	Irineu Esteve Altimiras	Andorra	2:07:50.9	+10:03.8
33	57	Alexander Brandner	Austria	2:08:08.9	+10:21.8
34	33	Giovanni Ticco	Italy	2:08:26.5	+10:39.4
35	40	Adam Fellner	Czech Republic	2:08:33.8	+10:46.7
36	39	Haruki Yamashita	Japan	2:08:40.3	+10:53.2
37	27	Paolo Ventura	Italy	2:08:52.7	+11:05.6
38	34	Candide Pralong	Switzerland	2:09:03.5	+11:16.4
39	35	Ryo Hirose	Japan	2:10:00.4	+12:13.3
40	56	Valeriy Gontar	Slovenia	2:10:31.3	+12:44.2
41	48	Benjamin Moser	Austria	2:11:03.0	+13:15.9
42	54	James Clugnet	Great Britain	2:11:28.8	+13:41.7
43	26	Florian Notz	Germany	2:11:37.4	+13:50.3
44	46	Yuito Habuki	Japan	2:12:15.1	+14:28.0
45	47	Vladislav Kovalyov	Kazakhstan	2:12:15.1	+14:28.0
46	49	Oleksandr Lisohor	Ukraine	2:12:37.9	+14:50.8
47	36	Martin Himma	Estonia	2:13:02.2	+15:15.1
48	61	Franco Dal Farra	Argentina	2:13:08.7	+15:21.6
49	43	Max Hollmann	Canada	2:16:05.7	+18:18.6
50	58	Seve de Campo	Australia	2:16:43.2	+18:56.1
51	60	Daniel Peshkov	Bulgaria	2:16:55.7	+19:08.6
52	50	Raimo Vīgants	Latvia	2:17:20.7	+19:33.6
53	59	Dagur Benediktsson	Iceland	2:17:35.9	+19:48.8
54	45	JC Schoonmaker	United States	2:17:59.8	+20:12.7
55	42	Miha Ličef	Slovenia	2:18:39.8	+20:52.7
56	63	Gabriel Gledhill	Great Britain	2:19:25.3	+21:38.2
57	55	Jan Stölben	Germany	2:19:35.1	+21:48.0
58	37	Luke Jager	United States	2:19:59.1	+22:12.0
59	51	Olzhas Klimin	Kazakhstan	2:23:05.5	+25:18.4
60	64	Phillip Bellingham	Australia	2:23:16.4	+25:29.3
61	71	Sebastian Endrestad	Chile	LAP	
62	75	Ján Adamov	Slovakia	LAP	
63	72	Tautvydas Strolia	Lithuania	LAP	
64	69	Silvestrs Švauksts	Latvia	LAP	
65	70	Bentley Walker-Broose	Australia	LAP	
66	65	Fredrik Fodstad	Colombia	LAP	
67	68	Ádám Büki	Hungary	LAP	
68	67	Ádám Kónya	Hungary	LAP	
69	62	Lauris Kaparkalējs	Latvia	LAP	
70	73	Fedele de Campo	Australia	LAP	
71	66	Mathis Poutot	Belgium	LAP	
	7	Mathis Desloges	France	DNF	
	19	Jonas Baumann	Switzerland	DNF	
	53	Vitaliy Pukhkalo	Kazakhstan	DNF	
	74	Stevenson Savart	Haiti	DNF	
