= FIS Nordic World Ski Championships 2025 – Men's 10 kilometre classical =

Men's 10 kilometre classical at the FIS Nordic World Ski Championships 2025
- Venue: Granåsen Ski Centre
- Location: Trondheim, Norway
- Dates: 26 February (qualification); 4 March
- Competitors: 108 from 46 nations
- Winning time: 28:16.6

Medalists
gold medal	Johannes Høsflot Klæbo	Norway
silver medal	Erik Valnes	Norway
bronze medal	Harald Østberg Amundsen	Norway

The Men's 10 kilometre classical competition at the FIS Nordic World Ski Championships 2025 was held on 4 March 2025.

== Results ==
=== Final ===
The race was started at 12:30.

Rank	Bib	Athlete	Country	Time	Deficit	Notes
1st place, gold medalist(s)	56	Johannes Høsflot Klæbo	Norway	28:16.6		
2nd place, silver medalist(s)	58	Erik Valnes	Norway	28:25.4	+8.8	
3rd place, bronze medalist(s)	60	Harald Østberg Amundsen	Norway	28:27.6	+11.0	
4	46	Edvin Anger	Sweden	28:30.8	+14.2	
5	54	Martin Løwstrøm Nyenget	Norway	28:31.0	+14.4	
6	62	William Poromaa	Sweden	28:31.9	+15.3	
7	32	Cyril Fähndrich	Switzerland	28:52.5	+35.9	
8	37	Michal Novák	Czech Republic	28:53.2	+36.6	
9	52	Mika Vermeulen	Austria	28:54.0	+37.4	
10	27	Ville Ahonen	Finland	28:54.5	+37.9	
11	50	Hugo Lapalus	France	29:12.7	+56.1	
12	22	Giovanni Ticcò	Italy	29:13.4	+56.8	
13	66	Gus Schumacher	United States	29:16.1	+59.5	
14	31	Rémi Bourdin	France	29:16.5	+59.9	
15	29	Ristomatti Hakola	Finland	29:17.1	+1:00.5	
16	24	Dietmar Nöckler	Italy	29:17.2	+1:00.6	
16	48	Andrew Musgrave	Great Britain	29:17.2	+1:00.6	
18	40	Antoine Cyr	Canada	29:17.9	+1:01.3	
19	42	Arsi Ruuskanen	Finland	29:18.0	+1:01.4	
20	30	Paolo Ventura	Italy	29:18.5	+1:01.9	
21	26	Niko Anttola	Finland	29:27.2	+1:10.6	
22	44	Jens Burman	Sweden	29:29.2	+1:12.6	
23	14	Francesco De Fabiani	Italy	29:29.4	+1:12.8	
24	15	Adam Fellner	Czech Republic	29:31.7	+1:15.1	
25	68	Friedrich Moch	Germany	29:38.5	+1:21.9	
26	36	Irineu Esteve Altimiras	Andorra	29:40.5	+1:23.9	
27	16	Zak Ketterson	United States	29:41.8	+1:25.2	
28	25	Clément Parisse	France	29:45.5	+1:28.9	
29	21	Albert Kuchler	Germany	29:49.8	+1:33.2	
30	3	Matyáš Bauer	Czech Republic	29:50.7	+1:34.1	
31	35	Calle Halfvarsson	Sweden	29:51.5	+1:34.9	
32	69	Tomáš Dufek	Czech Republic	29:51.9	+1:35.3	
33	34	Beda Klee	Switzerland	29:52.1	+1:35.5	
34	65	Tobias Ganner	Austria	29:56.9	+1:40.3	
35	33	Alvar Johannes Alev	Estonia	29:57.5	+1:40.9	
36	20	Ryo Hirose	Japan	29:58.8	+1:42.2	
37	28	Janosch Brugger	Germany	30:04.7	+1:48.1	
38	23	Olivier Léveillé	Canada	30:07.5	+1:50.9	
39	19	Martin Himma	Estonia	30:18.1	+2:01.5	
40	39	Zanden McMullen	United States	30:24.4	+2:07.8	
41	70	Thomas Maloney Westgård	Ireland	30:29.5	+2:12.9	
42	13	Miha Ličef	Slovenia	30:30.6	+2:14.0	
43	12	Max Hollmann	Canada	30:32.6	+2:16.0	
44	18	Dominik Bury	Poland	30:34.2	+2:17.6	
45	17	Haruki Yamashita	Japan	30:40.7	+2:24.1	
46	64	Simen Hegstad Krüger	Norway	30:41.4	+2:24.8	
47	38	Ben Ogden	United States	30:48.5	+2:31.9	
48	5	Miha Šimenc	Slovenia	30:49.0	+2:32.4	
49	4	Imanol Rojo	Spain	30:59.8	+2:43.2	
50	75	Gabriel Gledhill	Great Britain	31:06.7	+2:50.1	
51	63	Yernar Nursbekov	Kazakhstan	31:10.8	+2:54.2	
52	53	Seve de Campo	Australia	31:14.8	+2:58.2	
53	51	Dagur Benediktsson	Iceland	31:19.5	+3:02.9	
54	2	Vitaliy Pukhkalo	Kazakhstan	31:20.5	+3:03.9	
55	11	Nail Bashmakov	Kazakhstan	31:21.6	+3:05.0	
56	10	Daito Yamazaki	Japan	31:21.7	+3:05.1	
57	57	Piotr Jarecki	Poland	31:26.1	+3:09.5	
58	87	Fredrik Fodstad	Colombia	31:27.1	+3:10.5	
59	9	Yuito Habuki	Japan	31:27.8	+3:11.2	
60	59	Vili Črv	Slovenia	31:29.0	+3:12.4	
61	7	Raimo Vīgants	Latvia	31:30.5	+3:13.9	
62	74	Ralf Kivil	Estonia	31:33.9	+3:17.3	
63	61	Valeriy Gontar	Slovenia	31:40.5	+3:23.9	
64	55	Batmönkhiin Achbadrakh	Mongolia	31:40.8	+3:24.2	
65	1	Henri Roos	Estonia	31:41.4	+3:24.8	
66	8	Oleksandr Lisohor	Ukraine	31:50.4	+3:33.8	
67	49	Daniel Peshkov	Bulgaria	31:53.6	+3:37.0	
68	67	Paul Pepene	Romania	31:54.2	+3:37.6	
69	45	Mario Matikanov	Bulgaria	31:59.7	+3:43.1	
70	41	Lauris Kaparkalējs	Latvia	32:05.5	+3:43.9	
71	47	Sebastian Bryja	Poland	32:15.1	+3:58.5	
72	107	Kuerbanjiang Wuerkaixi	China	32:15.4	+3:58.8	
73	101	Micha Büchel	Liechtenstein	32:21.4	+4:04.8	
74	78	Florin Dolhascu	Romania	32:25.5	+4:08.9	
75	83	Lars Young Vik	Australia	32:25.9	+4:09.3	
76	43	Franco Dal Farra	Argentina	32:33.1	+4:16.5	
77	6	Olzhas Klimin	Kazakhstan	32:42.0	+4:25.4	
78	76	Dmytro Drahun	Ukraine	32:51.0	+4:34.4	
79	109	Liu Rongsheng	China	32:52.8	+4:36.2	
80	104	Stevenson Savart	Haiti	33:08.3	+4:51.7	
81	102	Samuel Maes	Belgium	33:11.5	+4:54.9	
82	73	Byun Ji-yeong	South Korea	33:11.6	+4:55.0	
83	94	Bentley Walker-Broose	Australia	33:16.6	+5:00.0	
84	92	Ionuț Costea	Romania	33:18.3	+5:01.7	
85	105	Ján Adamov	Slovakia	33:19.6	+5:03.0	
86	89	Ádám Kónya	Hungary	33:24.2	+5:07.6	
87	72	Lee Joon-seo	South Korea	33:26.8	+5:10.2	
88	85	Ruslan Denysenko	Ukraine	33:40.3	+5:23.7	
88	100	Fedele de Campo	Australia	33:40.3	+5:23.7	
90	108	Ástmar Helgi Kristinsson	Iceland	33:56.3	+5:39.7	
91	71	Gabriel Cojocaru	Romania	33:57.5	+5:40.9	
92	77	Mikayel Mikayelyan	Armenia	34:00.2	+5:43.6	
93	93	Frode Hymer	Iceland	34:10.2	+5:53.6	
94	106	Magnus Tobiassen	Denmark	34:12.3	+5:55.7	
95	79	Matej Horniak	Slovakia	34:14.1	+5:57.5	
96	97	Marko Skender	Croatia	34:25.2	+6:08.6	
97	103	Jēkabs Skolnieks	Latvia	34:39.4	+6:22.8	
98	98	Sebastián Endrestad	Chile	35:10.0	+6:53.4	
99	82	Miloš Milosavljević	Serbia	35:17.3	+7:00.7	
100	90	Ádám Büki	Hungary	35:22.8	+7:06.2	
101	84	Mark Chanloung	Thailand	35:23.9	+7:07.3	
102	95	Strahinja Erić	Bosnia and Herzegovina	35:24.4	+7:07.8	
103	81	Niks Saulītis	Latvia	35:40.9	+7:24.3	
104	88	Mathis Poutot	Belgium	36:12.2	+7:55.6	
105	99	Tautvydas Strolia	Lithuania	36:14.9	+7:58.3	
106	86	Denys Muhotinov	Ukraine	36:17.8	+8:01.2	
107	80	Stavre Jada	North Macedonia	36:27.4	+8:10.8	
	96	Abdullah Yılmaz	Turkey	Did not finish		
	91	Spartak Voskanyan	Armenia	Did not start		

=== Qualification ===
The qualification (which was run over 7.5 kilometre) was started on 26 February at 15:30.

Rank	Bib	Athlete	Country	Time	Deficit	Notes
1	68	Kuerbanjiang Wuerkaixi	China	20:32.2		Q
2	61	Liu Rongsheng	China	20:50.8	+18.6	Q
3	90	Micha Büchel	Liechtenstein	21:14.8	+42.6	Q
4	63	Jacob Weel Rosbo	Denmark	21:26.7	+54.5	Q
5	82	Stevenson Savart	Haiti	21:31.6	+59.4	Q
6	67	Ástmar Helgi Kristinsson	Iceland	21:39.0	+1:06.8	Q
7	89	Samuel Maes	Belgium	21:45.9	+1:13.7	Q
8	78	Ján Adamov	Slovakia	21:47.3	+1:15.1	Q
9	84	Jēkabs Skolnieks	Latvia	21:56.5	+1:24.3	Q
10	75	Magnus Tobiassen	Denmark	22:12.5	+1:40.3	Q
11	86	Dāvis Kalniņš	Latvia	22:13.1	+1:40.9	
12	70	Otgonlkhagvagiin Zolbayar	Mongolia	22:14.2	+1:42.0	
13	79	Modestas Vaičiulis	Lithuania	22:15.2	+1:43.0	
14	69	Einar Árni Gíslason	Iceland	22:16.3	+1:44.1	
15	83	Aleksandar Grbović	Montenegro	22:27.5	+1:55.3	
16	74	Manex Silva	Brazil	22:29.2	+1:57.0	
17	73	José Cabeça	Portugal	22:33.8	+2:01.6	
18	81	Amed Oğlağo	Turkey	22:46.5	+2:14.3	
19	80	Timo Juhani Grönlund	Bolivia	22:53.6	+2:21.4	
20	72	Apostolos Angelis	Greece	22:55.4	+2:23.2	
21	65	Bruno Krampe	Latvia	22:58.6	+2:26.4	
22	87	Mateo Lorenzo Sauma	Argentina	23:14.8	+2:42.6	
23	76	Indriķis-Ints Circens	Latvia	23:15.0	+2:42.8	
24	77	Liam Burton	Australia	23:16.6	+2:44.4	
25	66	Nikolaos Tsourekas	Greece	23:47.4	+3:15.2	
26	52	Emil Kristensen	Denmark	23:55.4	+3:23.2	
27	50	Lee Chieh-han	Chinese Taipei	23:58.2	+3:26.0	
28	19	Rakan Alireza	Saudi Arabia	24:02.8	+3:30.6	
29	56	Victor Santos	Brazil	24:08.6	+3:36.4	
30	54	Matas Gražys	Lithuania	24:10.3	+3:38.1	
31	32	Daujotas Jonikas	Lithuania	24:15.7	+3:43.5	
32	45	Csongor Ferbár	Hungary	24:21.0	+3:48.8	
33	51	Danyal Savehshemshaki	Iran	24:24.9	+3:52.7	
34	64	Rhaick Bomfim	Brazil	24:35.4	+4:03.2	
35	60	Ariunjargalyn Khüslen	Mongolia	24:35.8	+4:03.6	
36	25	Mahdi Tir	Iran	24:54.1	+4:21.9	
37	39	Allan Corona	Mexico	24:56.3	+4:24.1	
38	29	Matthew Smith	South Africa	25:07.7	+4:35.5	
39	49	Stanzin Lundup	India	25:08.8	+4:36.6	
40	33	Théo Mallett	Haiti	25:09.4	+4:37.2	
41	47	Andrija Tošić	Serbia	25:10.0	+4:37.8	
42	21	Rafael Lundblad	Colombia	25:18.0	+4:45.8	
42	57	Padma Namgail	India	25:18.0	+4:45.8	
44	58	Matija Štimac	Croatia	25:23.6	+4:51.4	
45	16	Artur Saparbekov	Kyrgyzstan	25:26.2	+4:54.0	
46	43	Thanakorn Ngoeichai	Thailand	25:27.2	+4:55.0	
47	59	Dylan Longridge	Ireland	25:35.1	+5:02.9	
48	22	Seyed Ahmad Reza Seyd	Iran	25:41.7	+5:09.5	
49	55	Boris Štefančić	Croatia	25:48.8	+5:16.6	
50	71	Ioannis Karamichos	Greece	25:51.8	+5:19.6	
51	27	Alireza Moghdid	Iran	25:52.2	+5:20.0	
52	20	Musa Rakhmanberdi Uulu	Kyrgyzstan	25:55.5	+5:23.3	
53	42	Shubam Parihar	India	25:56.7	+5:24.5	
54	48	Yonathan Fernández	Chile	25:58.2	+5:26.0	
55	38	Attila Kertész	Israel	25:58.9	+5:26.7	
56	24	Jaime Huerta	Peru	26:07.0	+5:34.8	
57	46	Semer Tawk	Lebanon	26:15.4	+5:43.2	
58	18	Marcelino Tawk	Lebanon	26:23.4	+5:51.2	
59	62	Darko Damjanovski	North Macedonia	26:28.0	+5:55.8	
60	12	Simon Sancet	San Marino	26:36.7	+6:04.5	
61	53	Eldar Kadyrov	Kyrgyzstan	26:58.2	+6:26.0	
62	13	Juan Luis Uberuaga	Chile	26:58.4	+6:26.2	
63	34	Panagiotis Papasis	Greece	26:58.6	+6:26.4	
64	40	Ivano Pelko	Croatia	27:01.6	+6:29.4	
65	28	Thanatip Bunrit	Thailand	27:06.8	+6:34.6	
66	26	Pedro Montes de Oca	Mexico	27:21.9	+6:49.7	
67	36	Guillermo Racero	Venezuela	27:28.7	+6:56.5	
68	1	Elie Tawk	Lebanon	28:00.9	+7:28.7	
69	31	Juan Carlos Ayala	Mexico	28:04.1	+7:31.9	
70	15	Paul Keyrouz	Lebanon	28:04.6	+7:32.4	
71	14	Đorđe Paunović	Serbia	28:14.7	+7:42.5	
72	9	Tserendendeviin Zolbayar	Mongolia	28:15.4	+7:43.2	
73	7	Tristan Monchablon	Dominica	29:28.7	+8:56.5	
74	37	Klaus Jungbluth	Ecuador	29:30.6	+8:58.4	
75	30	Filipe Cabrita	Portugal	29:30.9	+8:58.7	
76	17	Victor Domingo Olsgard	Peru	29:45.5	+9:13.3	
77	3	Dennis Moronge	Kenya	29:50.0	+9:17.8	
78	5	Eduardo Arteaga	Venezuela	30:05.5	+9:33.3	
79	23	Antonio Pineyro	Mexico	30:28.3	+9:56.1	
80	6	Nicholas Lau	Trinidad and Tobago	31:28.4	+10:56.2	
81	11	Nicolás Cornejo	Chile	31:34.8	+11:02.6	
82	4	Frederick Arthur Crosetto	Malta	33:16.9	+12:44.7	
	2	Mauricio Valdés	Colombia	Disqualified		
	8	Rodrigo Ideus	Colombia	Disqualified		
	10	Samuel Jaramillo	Colombia	Disqualified		
	88	Sebastian Kildebo	Colombia	Disqualified		
	35	Samuel Ikpefan	Nigeria	Did not finish		
	41	Guilherme Pereira Santos	Brazil	Did not finish		
	85	Martín Flores	Chile	Did not finish		
	44	Joachim Weel Rosbo	Denmark	Did not start		
