= 2023–24 Tour de Ski =

18th edition of the Tour de Ski

Tour de Ski
2023–24 FIS Cross-Country World Cup

Ski tour details
- Venue(s): Toblach, Italy; Davos, Switzerland; Val di Fiemme, Italy
- Dates: 30 December 2023 – 7 January 2024
- Stages: 7

Results
Men
Jersey awarded to the men's overall winner	Winner	Harald Østberg Amundsen (NOR)
	Second	Friedrich Moch (GER)
	Third	Hugo Lapalus (FRA)
Jersey awarded to the men's points classification winner	Points	Lucas Chanavat (FRA)
Women
Jersey awarded to the women's overall winner	Winner	Jessie Diggins (USA)
	Second	Heidi Weng (NOR)
	Third	Kerttu Niskanen (FIN)
Jersey awarded to the women's points classification winner	Points	Linn Svahn (SWE)

The 2023–24 Tour de Ski was the 18th edition of the Tour de Ski and part of the 2023–24 FIS Cross-Country World Cup. The World Cup stage event began in Toblach, Italy on 30 December 2023 and concluded with the traditional Final Climb stage in Val di Fiemme, Italy, on 7 January 2024. The tour started in Toblach for the second time. Johannes Høsflot Klæbo from Norway and Frida Karlsson from Sweden were the winners of previous edition. Russia and Belarus were not allowed to compete after suspension by FIS council for this World Cup season due to Russian invasion of Ukraine. The Tour was won by Jessie Diggins from the United States, which is her second overall victory and Harald Østberg Amundsen from Norway, his first title.

== Schedule ==
Stage	Venue	Date	Event	Technique	Distance		Start time (CET)	
Stage	Venue	Date	Event	Technique	Women	Men	Women	Men
1	(Italy) Toblach	30 December 2023	Sprint	Free	1.4 km	1.4 km	14:30	14:30
2	(Italy) Toblach	31 December 2023	Distance, interval start	Classic	10 km	10 km	12:15	15:00
3	(Italy) Toblach	1 January 2024	Distance, pursuit	Free	20 km	20 km	12:30	10:00
4	(Switzerland) Davos	3 January 2024	Sprint	Free	1.2 km	1.2 km	17:00	17:00
5	(Switzerland) Davos	4 January 2024	Distance, pursuit	Classic	20 km	20 km	10:45	13:00
6	(Italy) Val di Fiemme	6 January 2024	Distance, mass start	Classic	15 km	15 km	11:30	15:25
7	(Italy) Val di Fiemme	7 January 2024	Final Climb, mass start	Free	10 km	10 km	15:45	14:30

== Overall leadership ==
Two main individual classifications were contested in the 2023–24 Tour de Ski, as well as a team competition. The most important was the overall standings, calculated by adding each skier's finishing times on each stage. Time bonuses (time subtracted) were awarded at both sprint stages and at intermediate points during mass start stage 6. In the sprint stages, the winners were awarded 60 bonus seconds, while on mass start stage 6, the first ten skiers past the intermediate point received from 15 seconds to 1 seconds. The skier with the lowest cumulative time was the overall winner of the Tour de Ski. For the first time in Tour history, the skier leading the overall standings wore a gold bib.

Bonus seconds for the top 30 positions by type
Type		1	2	3	4	5	6	7	8	9	10	11	12	13–15	16–20	21–25	26–30
In finish
In finish	Sprint	60	54	48	46	44	42	32	30	28	26	24	22	10	8	6	4
In finish	Interval start	none															
In finish	Pursuit	none															
In finish	Mass start	none															
Intermediate sprint	Mass start (only stage 6)	15	12	10	8	6	5	4	3	2	1	none					

The second competition was the points standings, which replaced the sprint competition from past editions. The skiers who received the highest number of points during the Tour win the points standings. The points available for each stage finish were determined by the stage's type. The leader was identified by a silver bib.

Points standings points for the top 10 positions by type
Type		1	2	3	4	5	6	7	8	9	10
In finish	Sprint	30	24	20	16	12	10	8	6	4	2
Intermediate sprint	Interval start (1st IT)	15	12	10	8	6	5	4	3	2	1
Intermediate sprint	Pursuit (1st IT)	15	12	10	8	6	5	4	3	2	1
Intermediate sprint	Mass start	15	12	10	8	6	5	4	3	2	1

The final competition was a team competition. This was calculated using the finishing times of the best two skiers of both genders per team on each stage; the leading team was the team with the lowest cumulative time.

Classification leadership by stage
Stage	Men			Women		
Stage	Winner	Overall standings	Points standings	Winner	Overall standings	Points standings
1	Lucas Chanavat	Lucas Chanavat	Lucas Chanavat	Linn Svahn	Linn Svahn	Linn Svahn
2	Perttu Hyvärinen	Erik Valnes	Ben Ogden	Kerttu Niskanen	Jessie Diggins	Linn Svahn
3	Harald Østberg Amundsen	Harald Østberg Amundsen	Ben Ogden	Jessie Diggins	Jessie Diggins	Linn Svahn
4	Lucas Chanavat	Harald Østberg Amundsen	Lucas Chanavat	Linn Svahn	Jessie Diggins	Linn Svahn
5	Harald Østberg Amundsen	Harald Østberg Amundsen	Lucas Chanavat	Kerttu Niskanen	Jessie Diggins	Linn Svahn
6	Erik Valnes	Harald Østberg Amundsen	Lucas Chanavat	Linn Svahn	Jessie Diggins	Linn Svahn
7	Jules Lapierre	Harald Østberg Amundsen	Lucas Chanavat	Sophia Laukli	Jessie Diggins	Linn Svahn
Final		Harald Østberg Amundsen	Lucas Chanavat	Final	Jessie Diggins	Linn Svahn

== Final standings ==
Legend
Denotes the winner of the Overall standings	Denotes the winner of the Points standings

=== Overall standings ===
==== Men ====
Final overall standings (1–10)
Rank	Name	Time
1	Harald Østberg Amundsen (NOR)	3:41:21.9
2	Friedrich Moch (GER)	+1:19.2
3	Hugo Lapalus (FRA)	+1:32.8
4	Martin Løwstrøm Nyenget (NOR)	+1:57.3
5	Beda Klee (SUI)	+2:07.4
6	Erik Valnes (NOR)	+2:17.7
7	Henrik Dønnestad (NOR)	+2:41.7
8	Jens Burman (SWE)	+3:05.4
9	Jules Lapierre (FRA)	+3:53.8
10	Mika Vermeulen (AUT)	+3:56.6

Final overall standings (11–53)
Rank	Name	Time
11	Pål Golberg (NOR)	+4:16.8
12	Antoine Cyr (CAN)	+4:24.0
13	Cyril Fähndrich (SUI)	+5:19.0
14	William Poromaa (SWE)	+5:23.4
15	Jan Thomas Jenssen (NOR)	+5:39.3
16	Maurice Manificat (FRA)	+6:02.7
17	Perttu Hyvärinen (FIN)	+6:12.2
18	Leo Johansson (SWE)	+6:17.3
19	Lucas Bögl (GER)	+6:33.7
20	Théo Schely (FRA)	+7:08.4
21	Remi Lindholm (FIN)	+7:27.5
22	Calle Halfvarsson (SWE)	+7:30.5
23	Rémi Bourdin (FRA)	+7:36.7
24	Arsi Ruuskanen (FIN)	+7:37.7
25	Naoto Baba (JPN)	+7:50.7
26	Scott Patterson (USA)	+8:05.8
27	Andrew Young (GBR)	+8:27.6
28	Markus Vuorela (FIN)	+8:38.6
29	Paolo Ventura (ITA)	+8:42.1
30	Håvard Solås Taugbøl (NOR)	+8:51.5
31	Adam Fellner (CZE)	+9:01.4
32	Gustaf Berglund (SWE)	+9:05.5
33	Giandomenico Salvadori (ITA)	+9:42.7
34	Elia Barp (ITA)	+9:53.9
35	Imanol Rojo (ESP)	+10:29.5
36	Zanden McMullen (USA)	+10:29.6
37	Simone Daprà (ITA)	+10:40.3
38	Jules Chappaz (FRA)	+11:06.5
39	Edvin Anger (SWE)	+11:12.6
40	Thomas Maloney Westgård (IRL)	+11:14.3
41	Truls Gisselman (SWE)	+12:31.2
42	Ryo Hirose (JPN)	+12:50.8
43	Johan Häggström (SWE)	+13:06.6
44	Alvar Johannes Alev (EST)	+13:45.0
45	Olivier Léveillé (CAN)	+14:15.2
46	Nikita Gridin (KAZ)	+16:01.1
47	Vladislav Kovalyov (KAZ)	+19:34.7
48	Matz William Jenssen (NOR)	+20:03.5
49	Ansgar Evensen (NOR)	+22:39.8
50	Seve de Campo (AUS)	+24:27.9
51	Emil Danielsson (SWE)	+25:06.0
52	Fedor Karpov (KAZ)	+26:35.3
53	Lucas Chanavat (FRA)	+28:55.0

==== Women ====
Final overall standings (1–10)
Rank	Name	Time
1	Jessie Diggins (USA)	4:13:19.0
2	Heidi Weng (NOR)	+31.6
3	Kerttu Niskanen (FIN)	+39.7
4	Frida Karlsson (SWE)	+1:17.4
5	Jonna Sundling (SWE)	+1:47.9
6	Linn Svahn (SWE)	+2:06.3
7	Krista Pärmäkoski (FIN)	+2:08.6
8	Patrīcija Eiduka (LAT)	+2:23.5
9	Victoria Carl (GER)	+2:39.9
10	Delphine Claudel (FRA)	+2:41.2

Final overall standings (11–30)
Rank	Name	Time
11	Katharina Hennig (GER)	+2:50.6
12	Rosie Brennan (USA)	+2:56.4
13	Teresa Stadlober (AUT)	+3:05.7
14	Sophia Laukli (USA)	+3:20.5
15	Margrethe Bergane (NOR)	+3:42.6
16	Emma Ribom (SWE)	+4:05.6
17	Kristin Austgulen Fosnæs (NOR)	+4:31.7
18	Kateřina Janatová (CZE)	+6:18.6
19	Moa Ilar (SWE)	+6:55.4
20	Anne Kyllönen (FIN)	+9:20.2
21	Desiree Steiner (SUI)	+9:24.3
22	Caterina Ganz (ITA)	+9:43.2
23	Lisa Lohmann (GER)	+10:12.7
24	Nadja Kälin (SUI)	+10:45.8
25	Mathilde Myhrvold (NOR)	+11:56.5
26	Samantha Smith (USA)	+12:43.4
27	Sofia Henriksson (SWE)	+13:57.4
28	Vilma Ryytty (FIN)	+14:53.3
29	Lisa Ingesson (SWE)	+24:04.9
30	Nadezhda Stepashkina (KAZ)	+25:26.8

=== Points standings ===
==== Men ====
Final points standings (1–10)
Rank	Name	Points
1	Lucas Chanavat (FRA)	80
2	Jules Chappaz (FRA)	59
3	Edvin Anger (SWE)	54
4	Erik Valnes (NOR)	51
5	Harald Østberg Amundsen (NOR)	47
6	Antoine Cyr (CAN)	42
7	Mika Vermeulen (AUT)	27
8	Martin Løwstrøm Nyenget (NOR)	19
9	Håvard Solås Taugbøl (NOR)	17
10	Matz William Jenssen (NOR)	17

==== Women ====
Final points standings (1–10)
Rank	Name	Points
1	Linn Svahn (SWE)	71
2	Jessie Diggins (USA)	62
3	Frida Karlsson (SWE)	55
4	Jonna Sundling (SWE)	48
5	Katharina Hennig (GER)	35
6	Kerttu Niskanen (FIN)	34
7	Teresa Stadlober (AUT)	33
8	Heidi Weng (NOR)	32
9	Victoria Carl (GER)	22
10	Emma Ribom (SWE)	22

=== Team standings ===
Final team standings
Rank	Nation	Time
1	Norway	15:45:47.4
2	Sweden	+9:23.5
3	Finland	+14:04.9
4	Germany	+14:15.8
5	United States	+14:21.3
6	Switzerland	+22:09.9

== Stages ==
=== Stage 1 ===
30 December 2023, Toblach, Italy

- Bonus seconds to the 30 skiers that qualifies for the quarter-finals, distributed as following:
  - Final: 60–54–48–46–44–42
  - Semi-final: 32–30–28–26–24–22
  - Quarter-final: 10–10–10–8–8–8–8–8–6–6–6–6–6–4–4–4–4–4

Men – 1.4 km Sprint Free
Rank	Name	QT	Time	BS
1	Lucas Chanavat (FRA)	2:33.23 (1)	2:35.75	60
2	Jules Chappaz (FRA)	2:36.59 (7)	+0.22	54
3	Ben Ogden (USA)	2:36.86 (8)	+0.49	48
4	Erik Valnes (NOR)	2:36.23 (5)	+0.79	46
5	Valerio Grond (SUI)	2:35.76 (3)	+11.54	44
6	Harald Østberg Amundsen (NOR)	2:35.91 (4)	+28.56	42
7	Lauri Vuorinen (FIN)	2:39.15 (18)	SF	32
8	Matz William Jenssen (NOR)	2:38.27 (13)	SF	30
9	Michael Hellweger (ITA)	2:37.42 (9)	SF	28
10	Håvard Solås Taugbøl (NOR)	2:38.07 (12)	SF	26

Women – 1.4 km Sprint Free
Rank	Name	QT	Time	BS
1	Linn Svahn (SWE)	2:55.01 (3)	3:01.22	60
2	Jonna Sundling (SWE)	2:51.48 (1)	+0.07	54
3	Kristine Stavås Skistad (NOR)	2:57.78 (5)	+0.29	48
4	Emma Ribom (SWE)	2:59.21 (7)	+0.52	46
5	Nadine Fähndrich (SUI)	2:56.33 (4)	+1.34	44
6	Johanna Hagström (SWE)	3:01.73 (20)	+8.75	42
7	Coletta Rydzek (GER)	3:01.78 (21)	SF	32
8	Mathilde Myhrvold (NOR)	3:01.01 (15)	SF	30
9	Jessie Diggins (USA)	2:54.46 (2)	SF	28
10	Patrīcija Eiduka (LAT)	3:02.78 (26)	SF	26

=== Stage 2 ===
31 December 2023, Toblach, Italy

- No bonus seconds are awarded on this stage.

Men – 10 km Individual Classic
Rank	Name	Time
1	Perttu Hyvärinen (FIN)	23:08.6
2	Erik Valnes (NOR)	+16.2
3	Harald Østberg Amundsen (NOR)	+17.2
4	Jens Burman (SWE)	+27.4
5	William Poromaa (SWE)	+40.4
6	Beda Klee (SUI)	+42.9
7	Friedrich Moch (GER)	+44.6
8	Martin Løwstrøm Nyenget (NOR)	+45.8
9	Ben Ogden (USA)	+46.2
10	Hugo Lapalus (FRA)	+51.6

Women – 10 km Individual Classic
Rank	Name	Time
1	Kerttu Niskanen (FIN)	25:48.0
2	Victoria Carl (GER)	+6.7
3	Jessie Diggins (USA)	+10.7
4	Rosie Brennan (USA)	+15.2
5	Katharina Hennig (GER)	+29.0
6	Heidi Weng (NOR)	+40.8
7	Krista Pärmäkoski (FIN)	+43.4
8	Astrid Øyre Slind (NOR)	+45.5
9	Linn Svahn (SWE)	+52.3
10	Teresa Stadlober (AUT)	+53.2

=== Stage 3 ===
1 January 2024, Toblach, Italy

- Pursuit start lists are based on overall standings after two stages. In fact, stage 3 finish differences make the overall standings after stage 3.
- No bonus seconds are awarded on this stage.

Men – 20 km Pursuit Free
Rank	Name	Time
1	Harald Østberg Amundsen (NOR)	52:38.0
2	Erik Valnes (NOR)	+32.9
3	Jan Thomas Jenssen (NOR)	+1:04.6
4	William Poromaa (SWE)	+1:04.9
5	Martin Løwstrøm Nyenget (NOR)	+1:04.9
6	Friedrich Moch (GER)	+1:05.5
7	Beda Klee (SUI)	+1:06.3
8	Hugo Lapalus (FRA)	+1:06.3
9	Federico Pellegrino (ITA)	+1:08.8
10	Gus Schumacher (USA)	+1:09.2

Women – 20 km Pursuit Free
Rank	Name	Time
1	Jessie Diggins (USA)	58:18.7
2	Victoria Carl (GER)	+46.5
3	Linn Svahn (SWE)	+48.2
4	Jonna Sundling (SWE)	+48.2
5	Astrid Øyre Slind (NOR)	+49.6
6	Heidi Weng (NOR)	+51.7
7	Frida Karlsson (SWE)	+52.5
8	Kerttu Niskanen (FIN)	+52.6
9	Emma Ribom (SWE)	+55.7
10	Krista Pärmäkoski (FIN)	+1:18.0

=== Stage 4 ===
3 January 2024, Davos, Switzerland

- Bonus seconds to the 30 skiers that qualifies for the quarter-finals
  - Final: 60–54–48–46–44–42
  - Semi-final: 32–30–28–26–24–22
  - Quarter-final: 10–10–10–8–8–8–8–8–6–6–6–6–6–4–4–4–4–4

Men – 1.2 km Sprint Free
Rank	Name	QT	Time	BS
1	Lucas Chanavat (FRA)	2:14.90 (1)	2:15.07	60
2	Edvin Anger (SWE)	2:18.32 (4)	+0.25	54
3	Federico Pellegrino (ITA)	2:18.78 (6)	+0.44	48
4	Gus Schumacher (USA)	2:20.91 (15)	+2.06	46
5	Håvard Solås Taugbøl (NOR)	2:19.98 (11)	+2.53	44
6	Matz William Jenssen (NOR)	2:19.65 (9)	+2.54	42
7	Valerio Grond (SUI)	2:17.29 (2)	SF	32
8	Lauri Vuorinen (FIN)	2:20.68 (13)	SF	30
9	Erik Valnes (NOR)	2:20.54 (12)	SF	28
10	Benjamin Moser (AUT)	2:20.72 (14)	SF	26

Women – 1.2 km Sprint Free
Rank	Name	QT	Time	BS
1	Linn Svahn (SWE)	2:34.93 (2)	2:32.35	60
2	Kristine Stavås Skistad (NOR)	2:38.55 (7)	+1.30	54
3	Jessie Diggins (USA)	2:37.33 (5)	+1.73	48
4	Maja Dahlqvist (SWE)	2:36.84 (3)	+3.06	46
5	Johanna Hagström (SWE)	2:37.71 (6)	+3.59	44
6	Mathilde Myhrvold (NOR)	2:36.88 (4)	+3.91	42
7	Nadine Fähndrich (SUI)	2:39.33 (9)	SF	32
8	Anne Kjersti Kalvå (NOR)	2:42.42 (24)	SF	30
9	Alina Meier (SUI)	2:38.75 (8)	SF	28
10	Jasmi Joensuu (FIN)	2:40.46 (14)	SF	26

=== Stage 5 ===
4 January 2024, Davos, Switzerland

- Pursuit start lists are based on results of stage 4. In fact, overall standings after stage 5 are cumulative results of stages 3 & 5.
- No bonus seconds are awarded on this stage.

Men – 20 km Pursuit Classic
Rank	Name	Time
1	Harald Østberg Amundsen (NOR)	57:57.7
2	Henrik Dønnestad (NOR)	+0.5
3	Martin Løwstrøm Nyenget (NOR)	+34.6
4	Hugo Lapalus (FRA)	+34.7
5	Friedrich Moch (GER)	+35.7
6	Beda Klee (SUI)	+36.4
7	Antoine Cyr (CAN)	+49.6
8	Rémi Bourdin (FRA)	+51.3
9	Pål Golberg (NOR)	+1:09.0
10	Federico Pellegrino (ITA)	+1:14.1

Women – 20 km Pursuit Classic
Rank	Name	Time
1	Kerttu Niskanen (FIN)	1:12:00.7
2	Rosie Brennan (USA)	+0.8
3	Jessie Diggins (USA)	+8.7
4	Jonna Sundling (SWE)	+13.2
5	Frida Karlsson (SWE)	+13.6
6	Heidi Weng (NOR)	+13.9
7	Margrethe Bergane (NOR)	+14.4
8	Kristin Austgulen Fosnæs (NOR)	+15.1
9	Katharina Hennig (GER)	+15.2
10	Kateřina Janatová (CZE)	+16.6

=== Stage 6 ===
6 January 2024, Val di Fiemme, Italy

Men – 15 km Mass Start Classic
Rank	Name	Time	BS
1	Erik Valnes (NOR)	50:50.6	15
2	William Poromaa (SWE)	+0.9	3
3	Cyril Fähndrich (SUI)	+1.1	
4	Pål Golberg (NOR)	+7.0	
5	Friedrich Moch (GER)	+7.5	4
6	Harald Østberg Amundsen (NOR)	+7.9	10
7	Calle Halfvarsson (SWE)	+8.5	
8	Hugo Lapalus (FRA)	+8.9	5
9	Rémi Bourdin (FRA)	+9.2	
10	Martin Løwstrøm Nyenget (NOR)	+9.3	8

Women – 15 km Mass Start Classic
Rank	Name	Time	BS
1	Linn Svahn (SWE)	53:49.7	10
2	Frida Karlsson (SWE)	+0.4	15
3	Katharina Hennig (GER)	+1.6	5
4	Jonna Sundling (SWE)	+2.4	12
5	Teresa Stadlober (AUT)	+3.0	3
6	Delphine Claudel (FRA)	+3.8	
7	Victoria Carl (GER)	+5.2	8
8	Jessie Diggins (USA)	+5.7	6
9	Heidi Weng (NOR)	+7.9	2
10	Kerttu Niskanen (FIN)	+8.4	4

==== Stage 6 bonus seconds ====
- Men: 1 intermediate sprint, bonus seconds to the 10 first skiers (15–12–10–8–6–5–4–3–2–1) past the intermediate point.
- Women: 1 intermediate sprint, bonus seconds to the 10 first skiers (15–12–10–8–6–5–4–3–2–1) past the intermediate point.
- No bonus seconds are awarded at the finish

Bonus seconds (Stage 6 – Men)
Name	Point 1
Erik Valnes (NOR)	15
Jens Burman (SWE)	12
Harald Østberg Amundsen (NOR)	10
Martin Løwstrøm Nyenget (NOR)	8
Beda Klee (SUI)	6
Hugo Lapalus (FRA)	5
Friedrich Moch (GER)	4
William Poromaa (SWE)	3
Henrik Dønnestad (NOR)	2
Truls Gisselman (SWE)	1

Bonus seconds (Stage 6 – Women)
Name	Point 1
Frida Karlsson (SWE)	15
Jonna Sundling (SWE)	12
Linn Svahn (SWE)	10
Victoria Carl (GER)	8
Jessie Diggins (USA)	6
Katharina Hennig (GER)	5
Kerttu Niskanen (FIN)	4
Teresa Stadlober (AUT)	3
Heidi Weng (NOR)	2
Krista Pärmäkoski (FIN)	1

=== Stage 7 ===
7 January 2024, Val di Fiemme, Italy

- No bonus seconds are awarded on this stage.

Men – 10 km Final Climb Mass Start Free
Rank	Name	Time
1	Jules Lapierre (FRA)	33:00.7
2	Friedrich Moch (GER)	+2.4
3	Hugo Lapalus (FRA)	+16.0
4	Mika Vermeulen (AUT)	+27.8
5	Harald Østberg Amundsen (NOR)	+30.2
6	Martin Løwstrøm Nyenget (NOR)	+45.5
7	Jens Burman (SWE)	+46.6
8	Beda Klee (SUI)	+46.6
9	Arsi Ruuskanen (FIN)	+1:05.9
10	Maurice Manificat (FRA)	+1:10.9

Women – 10 km Final Climb Mass Start Free
Rank	Name	Time
1	Sophia Laukli (USA)	38:16.5
2	Heidi Weng (NOR)	+17.1
3	Delphine Claudel (FRA)	+37.7
4	Kerttu Niskanen (FIN)	+39.2
5	Patrīcija Eiduka (LAT)	+41.0
6	Jessie Diggins (USA)	+48.5
7	Krista Pärmäkoski (FIN)	+1:02.1
8	Kristin Austgulen Fosnæs (NOR)	+1:07.2
9	Katharina Hennig (GER)	+1:12.1
10	Frida Karlsson (SWE)	+1:21.9

== World Cup points distribution ==
The table shows the number of 2023–24 FIS Cross-Country World Cup points to win in the 2023–24 Tour de Ski for men and women.

Place	1	2	3	4	5	6	7	8	9	10	11	12	13	14	15	16	17	18	19	20	21	22	23	24	25	26	27	28	29	30	31	32	33	34	35	36	37	38	39	40	41	42	43	44	45	46	47	48	49	50
Overall Standings	300	285	270	255	240	225	216	207	198	189	180	174	168	162	156	150	144	138	132	126	120	114	108	102	96	90	84	78	72	66	60	57	54	51	48	45	42	39	36	33	30	27	24	21	18	15	12	9	6	3
Each Stage	50	47	44	41	38	35	32	30	28	26	24	22	20	18	16	15	14	13	12	11	10	9	8	7	6	5	4	3	2	1

== Sources ==
- Rules for the FIS Cross-Country World Cup Edition 2023/24 (PDF). International Ski Federation. 2023. Archived from the original (PDF) on 4 December 2023.
- FIS Cross-Country World Cup 2023/24 (PDF). International Ski Federation. 2023. Archived from the original (PDF) on 28 November 2023.
