= FIS Nordic World Ski Championships 2025 – Men's 20 kilometre skiathlon =

Men's 20 kilometre skiathlon at the FIS Nordic World Ski Championships 2025
- Venue: Granåsen Ski Centre
- Location: Trondheim, Norway
- Dates: 1 March
- Competitors: 102 from 41 nations
- Winning time: 44:22.3

Medalists
| gold medal | Johannes Høsflot Klæbo | Norway |
| silver medal | Martin Løwstrøm Nyenget | Norway |
| bronze medal | Harald Østberg Amundsen | Norway |

The Men's 20 kilometre skiathlon competition at the FIS Nordic World Ski Championships 2025 was held on 1 March 2025.

== Results ==
The race was started at 14:00.

| Rank | Bib | Athlete | Country | Time | Deficit |
|---|---|---|---|---|---|
| 1st place, gold medalist(s) | 1 | Johannes Høsflot Klæbo | Norway | 44:22.3 | |
| 2nd place, silver medalist(s) | 5 | Martin Løwstrøm Nyenget | Norway | 44:23.7 | +1.4 |
| 3rd place, bronze medalist(s) | 4 | Harald Østberg Amundsen | Norway | 44:23.7 | +1.4 |
| 4 | 12 | Jan Thomas Jenssen | Norway | 44:23.8 | +1.5 |
| 5 | 14 | Federico Pellegrino | Italy | 44:23.9 | +1.6 |
| 6 | 7 | Mathis Desloges | France | 44:24.6 | +2.3 |
| 7 | 13 | Andrew Musgrave | Great Britain | 44:24.9 | +2.6 |
| 8 | 11 | William Poromaa | Sweden | 44:25.1 | +2.8 |
| 9 | 10 | Gus Schumacher | United States | 44:25.9 | +3.6 |
| 10 | 9 | Friedrich Moch | Germany | 44:26.1 | +3.8 |
| 11 | 3 | Hugo Lapalus | France | 44:27.7 | +5.4 |
| 12 | 2 | Simen Hegstad Krüger | Norway | 44:32.3 | +10.0 |
| 13 | 6 | Mika Vermeulen | Austria | 45:19.4 | +57.1 |
| 14 | 8 | Edvin Anger | Sweden | 45:21.9 | +59.6 |
| 15 | 27 | Naoto Baba | Japan | 45:23.8 | +1:01.5 |
| 16 | 21 | Michal Novák | Czech Republic | 45:24.5 | +1:02.2 |
| 17 | 25 | Calle Halfvarsson | Sweden | 45:26.1 | +1:03.8 |
| 18 | 20 | Thomas Maloney Westgaard | Ireland | 45:30.2 | +1:07.9 |
| 19 | 17 | Jules Lapierre | France | 45:32.9 | +1:10.6 |
| 20 | 23 | Jonas Baumann | Switzerland | 45:39.7 | +1:17.4 |
| 21 | 36 | Simone Daprà | Italy | 45:52.8 | +1:30.5 |
| 22 | 34 | Jason Rüesch | Switzerland | 45:53.2 | +1:30.9 |
| 23 | 33 | Davide Graz | Italy | 45:53.5 | +1:31.2 |
| 24 | 29 | Joe Davies | Great Britain | 45:54.1 | +1:31.8 |
| 25 | 24 | Irineu Esteve Altimiras | Andorra | 45:54.4 | +1:32.1 |
| 26 | 37 | Clément Parisse | France | 45:54.6 | +1:32.3 |
| 27 | 32 | Florian Notz | Germany | 45:54.7 | +1:32.4 |
| 28 | 28 | Alvar Johannes Alev | Estonia | 45:55.2 | +1:32.9 |
| 29 | 46 | Adam Fellner | Czech Republic | 45:55.6 | +1:33.3 |
| 30 | 54 | Elias Keck | Germany | 46:14.2 | +1:51.9 |
| 31 | 51 | Kevin Bolger | United States | 46:15.9 | +1:53.6 |
| 32 | 31 | Remi Lindholm | Finland | 46:16.0 | +1:53.7 |
| 33 | 38 | Markus Vuorela | Finland | 46:16.6 | +1:54.3 |
| 34 | 39 | Olivier Leveille | Canada | 46:18.6 | +1:56.3 |
| 35 | 15 | Arsi Ruuskanen | Finland | 46:19.7 | +1:57.4 |
| 36 | 43 | Dominik Bury | Poland | 46:21.6 | +1:59.3 |
| 37 | 35 | Niko Anttola | Finland | 46:34.0 | +2:11.7 |
| 38 | 40 | Albert Kuchler | Germany | 46:43.4 | +2:21.1 |
| 39 | 50 | Daito Yamazaki | Japan | 46:46.4 | +2:24.1 |
| 40 | 18 | Antoine Cyr | Canada | 46:50.1 | +2:27.8 |
| 41 | 45 | Zak Ketterson | United States | 46:50.9 | +2:28.6 |
| 42 | 26 | Beda Klee | Switzerland | 47:27.9 | +3:05.6 |
| 43 | 44 | Haruki Yamashita | Japan | 47:29.1 | +3:06.8 |
| 44 | 59 | Miha Šimenc | Slovenia | 47:34.5 | +3:12.2 |
| 45 | 56 | Xavier McKeever | Canada | 47:36.0 | +3:13.7 |
| 46 | 19 | Zanden McMullen | United States | 47:37.3 | +3:15.0 |
| 47 | 61 | Matyáš Bauer | Czech Republic | 47:38.6 | +3:16.3 |
| 48 | 30 | Cyril Fähndrich | Switzerland | 47:39.0 | +3:16.7 |
| 49 | 41 | Ryo Hirose | Japan | 47:39.2 | +3:16.9 |
| 50 | 60 | Imanol Rojo | Spain | 47:41.3 | +3:19.0 |
| 51 | 16 | Jens Burman | Sweden | 48:02.8 | +3:40.5 |
| 52 | 48 | Miha Ličef | Slovenia | 48:11.0 | +3:48.7 |
| 53 | 22 | Elia Barp | Italy | 48:53.7 | +4:31.4 |
| 54 | 66 | Valeriy Gontar | Slovenia | 49:02.9 | +4:40.6 |
| 55 | 75 | Gabriel Gledhill | Great Britain | 49:13.1 | +4:50.8 |
| 56 | 64 | Paul Constantin Pepene | Romania | 49:36.5 | +5:14.2 |
| 57 | 49 | Nail Bashmakov | Kazakhstan | 49:37.0 | +5:14.7 |
| 58 | 67 | Piotr Jarecki | Poland | 49:37.4 | +5:15.1 |
| 59 | 62 | Christopher Kalev | Estonia | 49:38.8 | +5:16.5 |
| 60 | 65 | Yernar Nursbekov | Kazakhstan | 49:39.0 | +5:16.7 |
| 61 | 72 | Franco Dal Farra | Argentina | 49:42.9 | +5:20.6 |
| 62 | 58 | Olzhas Klimin | Kazakhstan | 49:59.1 | +5:36.8 |
| 63 | 53 | Max Hollmann | Canada | 50:01.4 | +5:39.1 |
| 64 | 70 | Daniel Peshkov | Bulgaria | 50:02.7 | +5:40.4 |
| 65 | 77 | Mikayel Mikayelyan | Armenia | 50:09.8 | +5:47.5 |
| 66 | 63 | Tomáš Dufek | Czech Republic | 50:16.8 | +5:54.5 |
| 67 | 102 | Kuerbanjiang Wuerkaixi | China | 50:20.7 | +5:58.4 |
| 68 | 71 | Mario Matikanov | Bulgaria | 50:32.9 | +6:10.6 |
| 69 | 78 | Florin Robert Dolhascu | Romania | 50:33.7 | +6:11.4 |
| 70 | 57 | Raimo Vīgants | Latvia | 50:53.1 | +6:30.8 |
| 71 | 69 | Dagur Benediktsson | Iceland | 50:56.5 | +6:34.2 |
| 72 | 87 | Fredrik Fodstad | Colombia | 51:14.5 | +6:52.2 |
| 73 | 52 | Vladislav Kovalyov | Kazakhstan | 51:19.2 | +6:56.9 |
| 74 | 80 | Wang Qiang | China | 51:26.0 | +7:03.7 |
| 75 | 84 | Mark Chanloung | Thailand | 52:12.7 | +7:50.4 |
| 76 | 93 | Ionuț Alexandru Costea | Romania | 52:13.7 | +7:51.4 |
| 77 | 91 | Spartak Voskanyan | Armenia | 52:15.8 | +7:53.5 |
| 78 | 55 | Oleksandr Lisohor | Ukraine | 52:18.9 | +7:56.6 |
| 79 | 94 | Bentley Walker-Broose | Australia | 52:21.9 | +7:59.6 |
| 80 | 74 | Byun Ji-yeong | South Korea | 52:23.2 | +8:00.9 |
| 81 | 85 | Ruslan Denysenko | Ukraine | 52:23.6 | +8:01.3 |
| 82 | 98 | Micha Büchel | Liechtenstein | 52:25.7 | +8:03.4 |
| 83 | 89 | Ádám Kónya | Hungary | 52:26.2 | +8:03.9 |
| 84 | 99 | Samuel Maes | Belgium | 52:42.7 | +8:20.4 |
| 85 | 68 | Achbadrakh Batmunkh | Mongolia | 52:43.9 | +8:21.6 |
| 86 | 96 | Tautvydas Strolia | Lithuania | Lapped | |
| 87 | 81 | Phillip Bellingham | Australia | Lapped | |
| 88 | 79 | Matej Horniak | Slovakia | Lapped | |
| 89 | 101 | Stevenson Savart | Haiti | Lapped | |
| 90 | 97 | Fedele de Campo | Australia | Lapped | |
| 91 | 83 | Miloš Milosavljević | Serbia | Lapped | |
| 92 | 100 | Jēkabs Skolnieks | Latvia | Lapped | |
| 93 | 95 | Sebastian Endrestad | Colombia | Lapped | |
| 94 | 86 | Denys Muhotinov | Ukraine | Lapped | |
| 95 | 82 | Niks Saulītis | Latvia | Lapped | |
| 96 | 92 | Silvestrs Švauksts | Latvia | Lapped | |
| 97 | 88 | Mathis Poutot | Belgium | Lapped | |
| 98 | 90 | Ádám Büki | Hungary | Lapped | |
| | 73 | Gabriel Cojocaru | Romania | Did not finish | |
| | 42 | Martin Himma | Estonia | Lapped | |
| | 47 | Andrew Young | Great Britain | Lapped | |
| | 76 | Andrej Renda | Slovakia | Lapped | |
