= List of Tour de Ski women's overall winners =

Women's Overall standings at the Tour de Ski
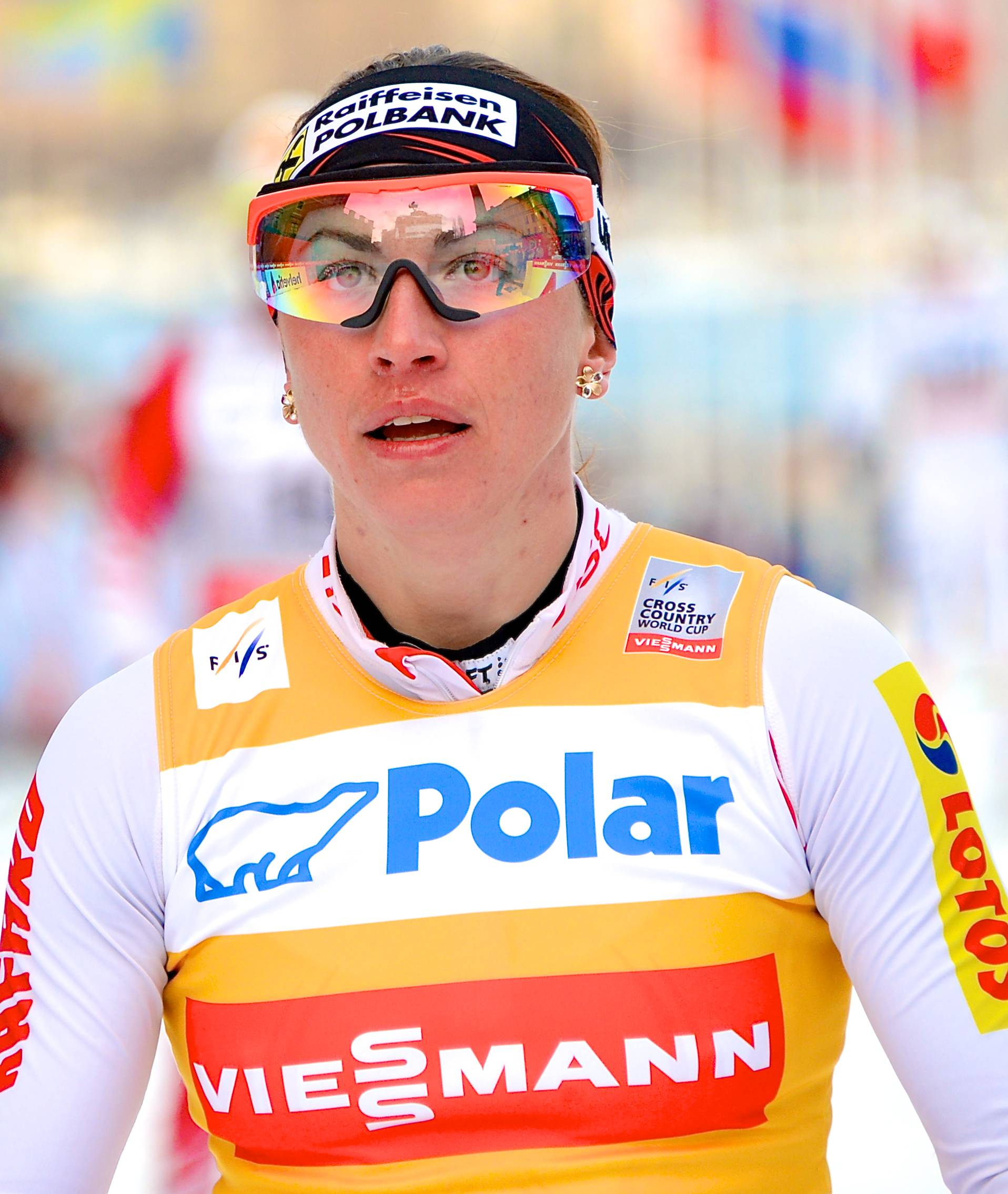
- Justyna Kowalczyk, winner of four consecutive Tour de Ski titles from 2009–10 to 2012–13.
- Location: Finished on the Alpe Cermis, Val di Fiemme, Italy
- Dates: Late December–early January annually

This is a list of the Tour de Ski women's overall winners. The Tour de Ski is an annual cross-country skiing event held annually since the 2006–07 season in Central Europe, modeled on the Tour de France of cycling. The Tour de Ski is a Stage World Cup event in the FIS Cross-Country World Cup. Each Tour de Ski has consisted of six to nine stages, held during late December and early January in the Czech Republic, Germany, Italy, and Switzerland.

The skier with the lowest aggregate time at the end of each day wears the gold bib, representing the leader of the overall standings. There are one other bibs as well: the silver bib, worn by the leader of the point standings and violet bib, worn by the leader of the climbing standings.

Justyna Kowalczyk and Therese Johaug won the most Tours with four. Kowalczyk is the only skier to win four consecutive Tours. Charlotte Kalla is the youngest winner of the women's Tour; she won in 2007–08, 20 years and 168 days old. Johaug is the oldest winner, having been 36 years, 194 days old when she won the 2024–25.

Norwegian skiers have won the most Tours with eight; Four Norwegian female skiers have won. The most recent winner is Jessie Diggins, who won her third title of the Tour de Ski in 2025–26 edition.

== History ==
The Tour de Ski was established in 2006 by FIS, after ideas emerging on a meeting between former Olympic gold medallist Vegard Ulvang and Jürg Capol, the International Ski Federation's (FIS) chief executive officer for cross-country competitions, in Ulvang's sauna in Maridalen, Norway. Their idea was to create a stage competition consisting of different events which they expected would lead to several days of continuous excitement before the most complete skiers would become Tour de Ski champions. Jürg Capol stated that FIS originally wished to start the race in the Alps. However, as neither Austria or Switzerland were interested, the opening two stages were to be held in Nové Město na Moravě in the Czech Republic. A week before the Tour was due to start, FIS announced that snow conditions in Nové Město were not good enough, and cancelled the two races there. The first Tour de Ski therefore opened with a sprint race in Munich on 31 December 2006, and was won by Marit Bjørgen (NOR).

Skiers from France, Germany and Norway, among others, said that the Tour de Ski was among their targets for the 2006–07 season, with Norwegian skier Jens Arne Svartedal claiming that the winner would have "extreme respect" for winning such an extreme race. Virpi Kuitunen (FIN) was the first women's overall winners of the Tour. Kuitunen won two of the six stages on her path to victory.

After the first Tour de Ski, reactions among athletes were largely positive. Norwegian athletes said "it was a good concept", German winner Tobias Angerer claimed that the Tour de Ski "has a great future", Oberstdorf in Bavaria was originally scheduled to host two stages, but cancelled as the German Ski Association could only arrange a race on 2 January. though many of the athletes expressed concern over the final climb up an alpine skiing hill both before and after the race. The director of FIS' cross-country committee, Vegard Ulvang, said the finish would be in the same place next year, but the way up could be changed. Ulvang also claimed that the Tour had been a success, and a "breakthrough for FIS" Ulvang did, however, admit that there would have to be some changes, as up to a third of participants in the Tour de Ski have struggled with illness or injury after the competition.

Newspaper comments were divided: in Expressen's opinion, the finish was the "most enjoyable competition seen in years," while Roland Wiedemann in Der Spiegel said this "should be the future of cross-country skiing". Critical commentaries appeared in Göteborgs-Posten, criticising the fact that sprinters didn't have a chance in the overall standings, and Wiesbaden Kurier, describing it as a reality show and a skiing circus.

In her first Tour in 2007–08, Charlotte Kalla became the second winner of the women's Tour de Ski, the first from Sweden. She also became the youngest winner of the Tour, aged 20 years, 168 days. Kuitunen became the first to win two Tours after winning the 2008–09 Tour de Ski. At a meeting in Venice, Italy, on 7 May 2009, Tour de Ski officials met with officials from the Giro d'Italia road cycle race to learn from the stage race to further improve Tour de Ski competition for the 2009–10 event.

In the early 2010s, the women's Tour was dominated by Justyna Kowalczyk, who won four consecutive Tours from 2009–10 to 2012–13. She also won three consecutive sprint competitions from 2010–11 to 2012–13. Kowalczyk's wins in 2009–10 and 2010–11 made her the first to defend a Tour de Ski title. Kowalczyk became the first skier to lead the Tour from the first stage and all the way to the finish when she won the 2010–11 Tour. Therese Johaug was the first Norwegian to win the Tour de Ski in 2013–14. By winning the 2015 Tour, Marit Bjørgen was the second skier to lead the overall standings after every stage of the Tour. Johaug won her second Tour in 2016. Heidi Weng won the 2016–17 and 2017–18 Tours and became the second women to defend a Tour de Ski title. In 2017–18, Jessie Diggins of USA became the first non-European to achieve a podium spot in the overall standings. In 2018–19 Ingvild Flugstad Østberg won last four consecutive stages and became the fourth Norwegian female winner of the tournament. Diggins became the first non-European winner in 2021. Johaug became the oldest winner of the Tour by winning 2024–25 edition, aged 36 years, 194 days. She also became the first winner of the new climbers classification and second women to win Tour four times.

== Winners ==
Key
†	Winner won the Sprint standings in the same year

- The "Year" column refers to the years the competition was held, and wikilinks to the article about that season.
- The "Distance" column refers to the distance over which the race was held, excluding sprint heats.
- The "Margin" column refers to the margin of time or points by which the winner defeated the runner-up.
- The "Stage wins" column refers to the number of stage wins the winner had during the race.

Tour de Ski women's overall winners
Year	Country	Skier	Distance	Time	Margin	Stage wins	Stages in lead	Stages
2006–07	Finland	Virpi Kuitunen^{†}	47 km (29 mi)	2:20:15.3	+ 1:17.5	3	3	6
2007–08	Sweden	Charlotte Kalla	56 km (35 mi)	2:43:01.0	+ 36.4	2	2	8
2008–09	Finland	Virpi Kuitunen	43 km (27 mi)	2:06:41.4	+ 7.2	3	4	7
2009–10	Poland	Justyna Kowalczyk	55 km (34 mi)	2:37:49.5	+ 24.2	2	3	8
2010–11	Poland	Justyna Kowalczyk^{†}	59 km (37 mi)	2:47:31.0	+ 1:21.5	4	8	8
2011–12	Poland	Justyna Kowalczyk^{†}	63 km (39 mi)	2:52:45.0	+ 28.2	4	8	9
2012–13	Poland	Justyna Kowalczyk^{†}	51 km (32 mi)	2:25:21.6	+ 27.9	4	6	7
2013–14	Norway	Therese Johaug	45 km (28 mi)	2:04:16.4	+ 20.4	2	1	7
2015	Norway	Marit Bjørgen^{†}	53 km (33 mi)	2:34:44.6	+ 1:39.2	5	7	7
2016	Norway	Therese Johaug	57 km (35 mi)	2:40:34.8	+ 2:20.9	3	2	8
2016–17	Norway	Heidi Weng	50 km (31 mi)	2:27:39.4	+ 1:37.0	1	2	7
2017–18	Norway	Heidi Weng	51 km (32 mi)	2:20:56.5	+ 48.5	2	1	6
2018–19	Norway	Ingvild Flugstad Østberg^{†}	52 km (32 mi)	2:30:31.2	+ 2:42.0	4	4	7
2019–20	Norway	Therese Johaug	53 km (33 mi)	2:28:18.6	+ 1:11.1	3	5	7
2021	United States	Jessie Diggins	63 km (39 mi)	3:04:45.8	+ 1:24.8	2	6	8
2021–22	Russia	Natalya Nepryayeva	43 km (27 mi)	1:59:38.5	+ 46.7	2	3	6
2022–23	Sweden	Frida Karlsson	68 km (42 mi)	3:09:31.4	+ 33.2	2	5	7
2023–24	United States	Jessie Diggins	78 km (48 mi)	4:13:19.0	+ 31.6	1	6	7
2024–25	Norway	Therese Johaug	80 km (50 mi)	3:46:59.0	+ 47.5	2	2	7
2025–26	United States	Jessie Diggins	48 km (30 mi)	2:11:26.1	+ 2:17.7	2	5	6

=== Multiple winners ===
The following skiers have won the Tour de Ski on 2 or more occasions.

Multiple winners of the overall Tour de Ski
Skier	Total	Editions
Justyna Kowalczyk (POL)	4	2009–10, 2010–11, 2011–12, 2012–13
Therese Johaug (NOR)	4	2013–14, 2016, 2019–20, 2024–25
Jessie Diggins (USA)	3	2021, 2023–24, 2025–26
Virpi Kuitunen (FIN)	2	2006–07, 2008–09,
Heidi Weng (NOR)	2	2016–17, 2017–18

=== By nationality ===
Tour de Ski women's overall winners by nationality
Country	No. of wins	No. of winning skiers
Norway	8	4
Poland	4	1
United States	3	1
Finland	2	1
Sweden	2	2
Russia	1	1
