= Hugo Lapalus =

French cross-country skier (born 1998)

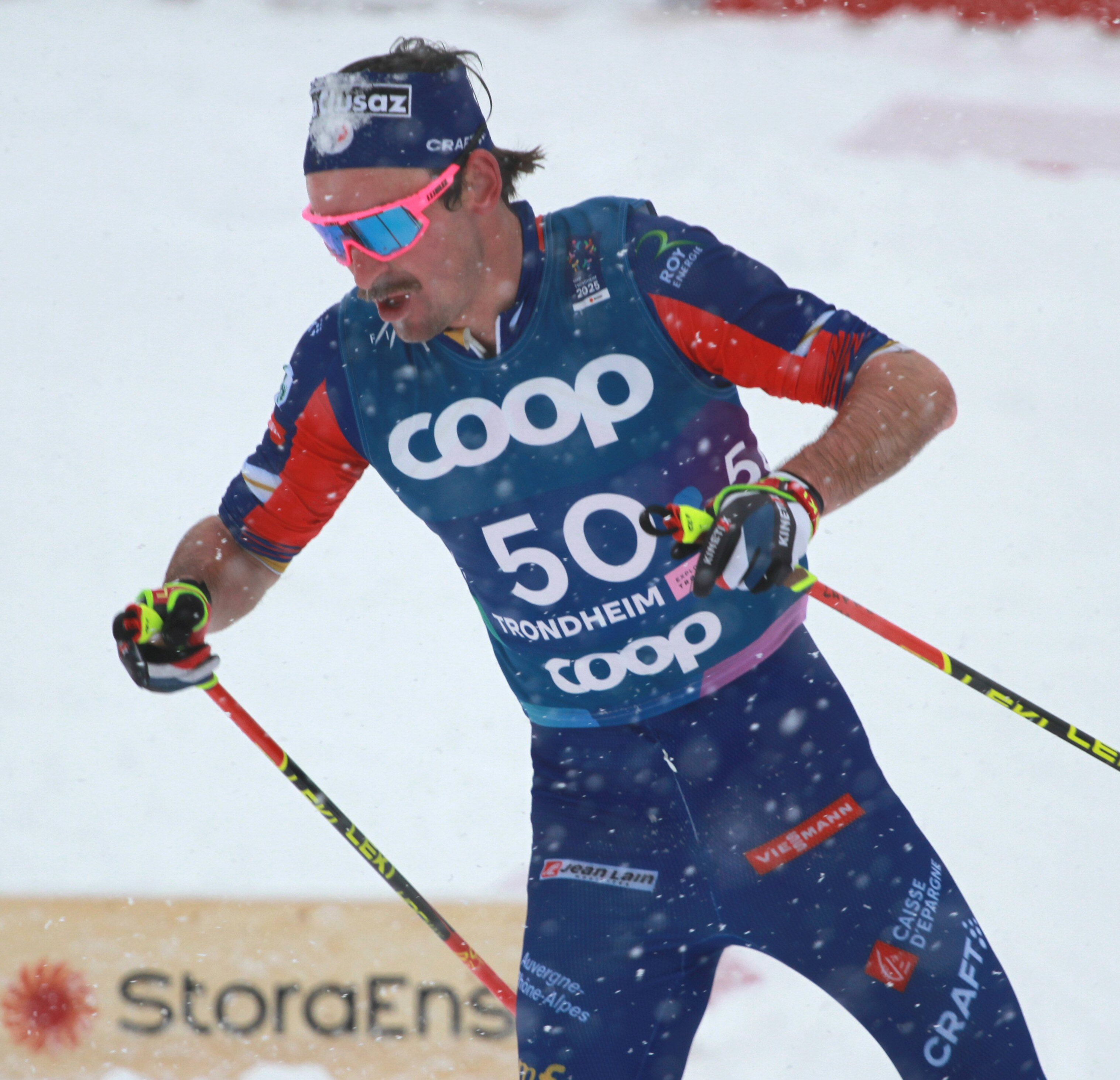
- Lapalus in 2025

Personal information
- Nationality: France
- Born: 9 July 1998 (age 28) Annecy, France

Sport
- Sport: Skiing
- Club: CS La Clusaz

World Cup career
- Seasons: 7 – (2019–present)
- Indiv. starts: 91
- Indiv. podiums: 3
- Team starts: 4
- Team podiums: 0
- Overall titles: 0 – (9th in 2024)
- Discipline titles: 2 – (2 U23)
Medal record
Men's cross-country skiing
Representing France
Olympic Games
Silver medal – second place	2026 Milano Cortina	4 × 7.5 km relay
Bronze medal – third place	2022 Beijing	4 × 10 km relay
World Championships
Bronze medal – third place	2021 Oberstdorf	4 × 10 km relay
U23 World Championships
Gold medal – first place	2021 Vuokatti	15 km freestyle
Bronze medal – third place	2020 Oberwiesenthal	15 km classical
Junior World Championships
Bronze medal – third place	2016 Râșnov	4 × 5 km relay
Bronze medal – third place	2017 Park City	4 × 5 km relay
- Updated on 15 December 2024

Hugo Lapalus (born 9 July 1998) is a French cross-country skier.

== Cross-country skiing results ==
All results are sourced from the International Ski Federation (FIS).

=== Olympic Games ===
- 1 medal (1 bronze)

Year	Age	15 km individual	30 km skiathlon	50 km mass start	Sprint	4 × 10 km relay	Team sprint
2022	23	7	DNF	—^{[a]}	—	Bronze	7

^{a} Distance reduced to 30 km due to weather conditions.

=== World Championships ===
- 1 medal – (1 bronze)

Year	Age	15 km individual	30 km skiathlon	50 km mass start	Sprint	4 × 10 km relay	Team sprint
2021	22	21	DNF	—	—	Bronze	—
2023	24	11	16	26	—	4	—
2025	26	11	11	16	—	4	—

=== World Cup ===
==== Season titles ====
- 2 titles – (2 U23)

Season
Season	Discipline
2020	Under-23
2021	Under-23

==== Season standings ====
Season	Age	Discipline standings				Ski Tour standings			
Season	Age	Overall	Distance	Sprint	U23	Nordic Opening	Tour de Ski	Ski Tour 2020	World Cup Final
2019	20	NC	NC	—	NC	—	—	—N/a	—
2020	21	52	36	NC	1st place, gold medalist(s)	—	36	—	—N/a
2021	22	24	21	NC	1st place, gold medalist(s)	37	10	—N/a	—N/a
2022	23	27	22	NC	—N/a	—N/a	15	—N/a	—N/a
2023	24	26	14	NC	—N/a	—N/a	12	—N/a	—N/a
2024	25	9	7	NC	—N/a	—N/a	3rd place, bronze medalist(s)	—N/a	—N/a
2025	26	7	3rd place, bronze medalist(s)	NC	—N/a	—N/a	3rd place, bronze medalist(s)	—N/a	—N/a

==== Individual podiums ====
- 4 podiums – (3 WC, 1 SWC)

No.	Season	Date	Location	Race	Level	Place
1	2023–24	7 January 2024	Val di Fiemme, Italy	10 km Mass Start F	Stage World Cup	3rd
2	2023–24	30 December 2023 – 7 January 2024	(Italy) (Switzerland) (Italy) Tour de Ski	Overall Standings	World Cup	3rd
3	2024–25	15 December 2024	Davos, Switzerland	20 km Individual C	World Cup	3rd
4	2024–25	28 December 2024 – 5 January 2025	(Italy) Tour de Ski	Overall Standings	World Cup	3rd
