= Max Hollmann =

Canadian cross-country skier (born 2002)

Personal information
- Nationality: Canada
- Born: January 29, 2002 (age 24) Thunder Bay, Ontario, Canada

Sport
- Sport: Skiing
- Club: Big Thunder Nordic
Medal record
Junior World Championships
Gold medal – first place	2024 Planica	Mixed U23 4 × 5 Km relay
- Updated on December 21, 2025

Max Hollmann (born January 29, 2002) is a Canadian cross-country skier.

== Career ==
Hollmann was part of the gold medal-winning team in the mixed U23 4 × 5 km relay at the 2024 Nordic Junior World Ski Championships in Planica, Slovenia.

At the start of 2025, Hollmann won the 10 km event at the Canadian Trials. In December 2025, at the 2025 Canadian Olympic trials in Vernon, British Columbia, Hollmann won the 10 km event. With the win, Hollmann secured his spot on Canada's 2026 Olympic team. On December 19, 2025, Hollmann was officially named to Canada's 2026 Olympic team.

== Results ==
=== World Championships ===
Year	Age	Individual	Skiathlon	50 km mass start	Sprint	Relay	Team sprint
2025	22	43	63	49	–	5	—
