= Michal Novák (skier) =

Czech cross-country skier (born 1996)

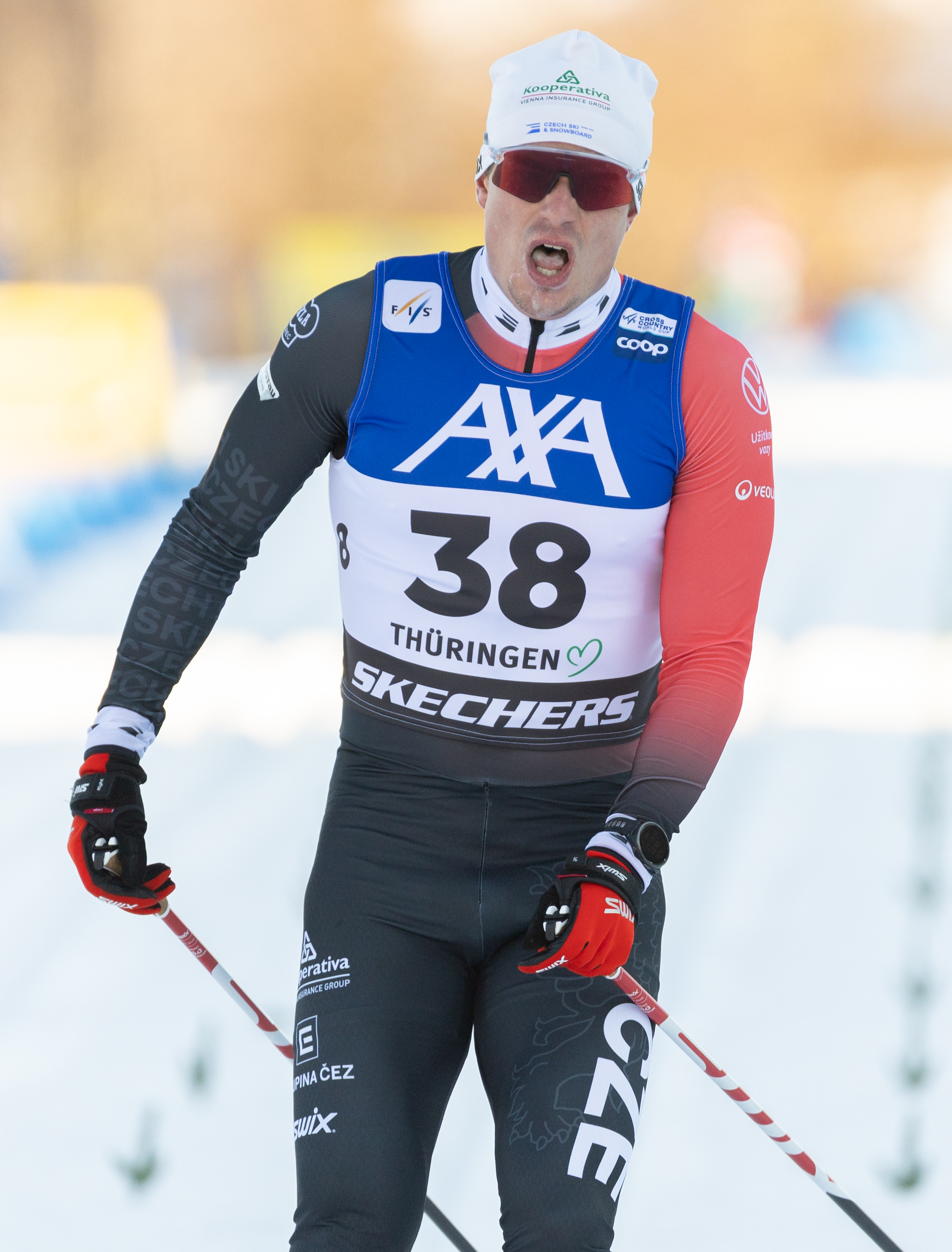
- Novák in 2026

Personal information
- Nationality: Czech Republic
- Born: 26 October 1996 (age 29) Karlovy Vary, Czech Republic

Sport
- Sport: Skiing
- Club: Dukla Liberec

World Cup career
- Seasons: 9 – (2016–present)
- Indiv. starts: 127
- Indiv. podiums: 1
- Team starts: 8
- Team podiums: 0
- Overall titles: 0 – (9th in 2023)
- Discipline titles: 0
Medal record
Men's cross-country skiing
Representing Czech Republic
U23 World Championships
Silver medal – second place	2019 Lahti	15 km freestyle
- Updated on 30 December 2023

Michal Novák (born 26 October 1996) is a Czech cross-country skier. He competed in the 2018 Winter Olympics. He won a silver medal in a 20-kilometre mass start race at the World Cup stage in Ruka on 26 November 2023.

== Cross-country skiing results ==
All results are sourced from the International Ski Federation (FIS).

=== Olympic Games ===
Year	Age	15 km individual	30 km skiathlon	50 km mass start	Sprint	4 × 10 km relay	Team sprint
2018	21	46	—	—	61	10	—
2022	25	50	18	DNS^{[a]}	23	12	14

^{a} Distance reduced to 30 km due to weather conditions.

=== World Championships ===
Year	Age	Individual	Skiathlon	Mass start	Sprint	Relay	Team sprint
2017	20	—	—	36	44	11	12
2019	22	39	—	36	37	11	17
2021	24	35	—	24	23	11	8
2023	26	12	—	—	4	—	9
2025	28	8	16	11	5	11	7

=== World Cup ===
==== Season standings ====
Season	Age	Discipline standings				Ski Tour standings				
Season	Age	Overall	Distance	Sprint	U23	Nordic Opening	Tour de Ski	Ski Tour 2020	World Cup Final	Ski Tour Canada
2016	19	NC	NC	—	NC	—	—	—N/a	—N/a	—
2017	20	NC	NC	NC	NC	67	DNF	—N/a	—	—N/a
2018	21	130	NC	72	20	56	39	—N/a	51	—N/a
2019	22	90	75	57	16	DNF	—	—N/a	—	—N/a
2020	23	66	53	47	—N/a	30	DNF	DNF	—N/a	—N/a
2021	24	34	54	13	—N/a	38	24	—N/a	—N/a	—N/a
2022	25	23	25	19	—N/a	—N/a	28	—N/a	—N/a	—N/a
2023	26	9	18	17	—N/a	—N/a	11	—N/a	—N/a	—N/a
2024	27	37	24	36	—N/a	—N/a	DNF	—N/a	—N/a	—N/a

==== Individual podiums ====
- 0 victories – (0 SWC, 0 WC)
- 1 podiums – (1 WC, 0 SWC)

No.	Season	Date	Location	Race	Level	Place
1	2023–24	26 November 2023	Rukatunturi, Finland	20 km F Mass Start	World Cup	2nd
