= Mika Vermeulen =

Austrian cross-country skier (born 1999)

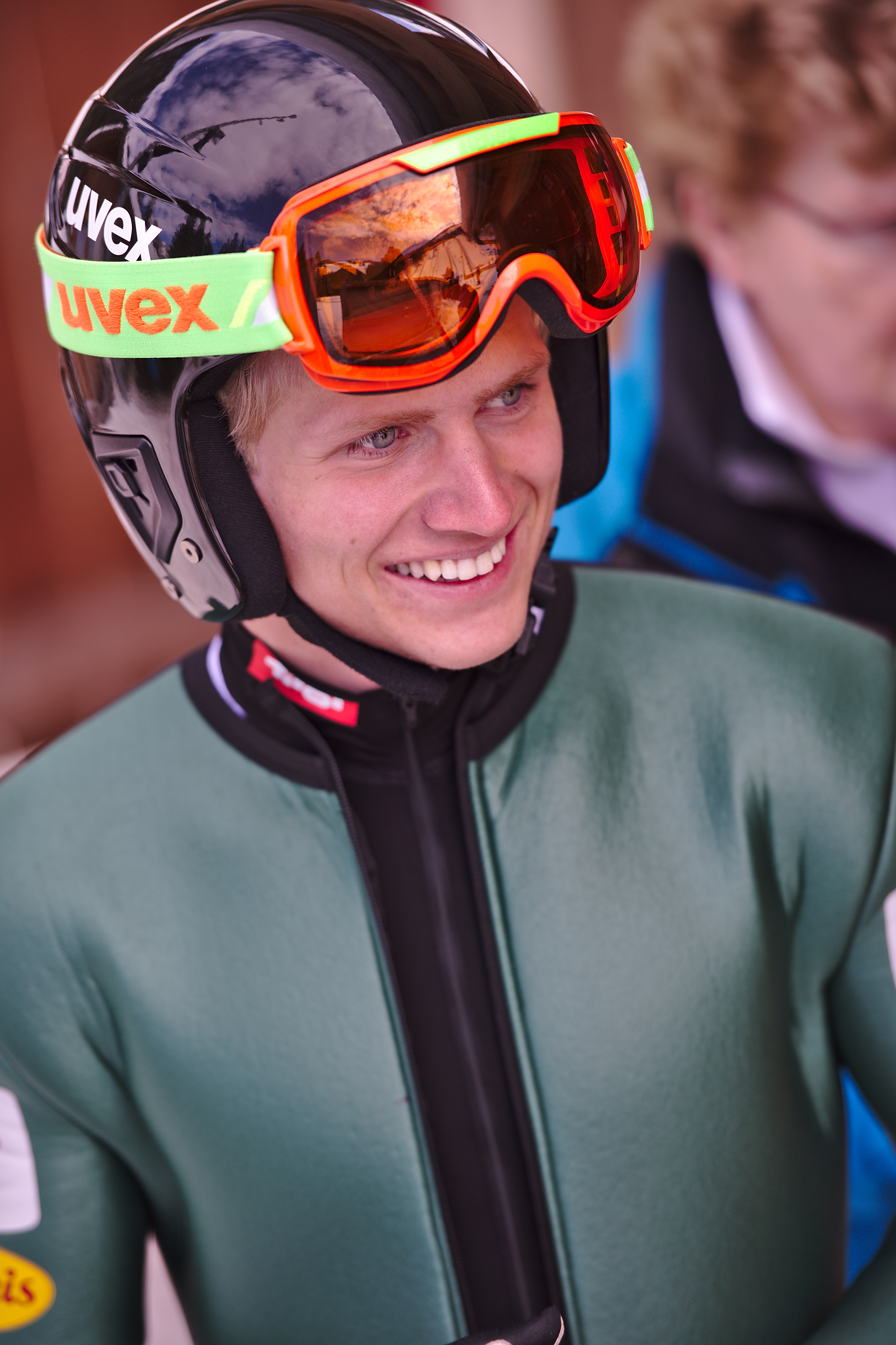
- Vermeulen in 2017

Personal information
- Nationality: Austria
- Born: 26 June 1999 (age 27) Schladming, Austria
- Height: 1.75 m (5 ft 9 in)

Sport
- Sport: Skiing
- Club: WSV Ramsau am Dachstein

World Cup career
- Seasons: 4 – (2021–present)
- Indiv. starts: 77
- Indiv. podiums: 4
- Team starts: 3
- Team podiums: 0
- Overall titles: 0 – (7th in 2024)
- Discipline titles: 0
- Updated on 30 November 2025

Mika Vermeulen (born 26 June 1999) is an Austrian cross-country skier. He competed in 30 kilometre skiathlon at the 2022 Winter Olympics.

He also competed at the FIS Nordic World Ski Championships 2021 and the 2020–21 FIS Cross-Country World Cup.

His brother Moran is a professional road cyclist. He has also competed in cycling, having competed for UCI Continental team WSA–Pushbikers in 2018.

He has been named after Mika Myllylä, a Finnish former cross-country skier.

== Cross-country skiing results ==
All results are sourced from the International Ski Federation (FIS).

=== Olympic Games ===
Year	Age	10/15 km individual	20/30 km skiathlon	50 km mass start	Sprint	4 × 10 km relay	Team sprint
2022	22	23	16	—^{[a]}	—	—	—
2026	26	27	41	—	—	—	—

^{a} Distance reduced to 30 km due to weather conditions.

=== World Championships ===
Year	Age	15 km individual	30 km skiathlon	50 km mass start	Sprint	4 × 10 km relay	Team sprint
2021	21	42	—	—	64	—	11
2023	23	—	29	19	—	—	—
2025	25	9	13	9	—	—	—

=== World Cup ===
==== Season standings ====
Season	Age	Discipline standings				Ski Tour standings	
Season	Age	Overall	Distance	Sprint	U23	Nordic Opening	Tour de Ski
2021	21	84	65	80	10	—	40
2022	22	113	65	NC	20	—N/a	—
2023	23	88	51	97	—N/a	—N/a	—
2024	24	7	5	59	—N/a	—N/a	10
2025	25	11	9	110	—N/a	—N/a	2nd place, silver medalist(s)
2026	26	29	15	—	—N/a	—N/a	—

==== Individual podiums ====
- 4 podiums – (3 WC, 1 SWC)

No.	Season	Date	Location	Race	Level	Place
1	2023–24	9 February 2024	Canmore, Canada	15 km Mass Start F	World Cup	3rd
2	2024–25	5 January 2025	Val di Fiemme, Italy	10 km Mass Start F	Stage World Cup	2nd
3	2024–25	28 December 2024 – 5 January 2025	(Italy) Tour de Ski	Overall Standings	World Cup	2nd
4	2025–26	28 November 2025	Rukatunturi, Finland	10 km Individual C	World Cup	3rd
