= Harald Østberg Amundsen =

Norwegian cross-country skier (born 1998)

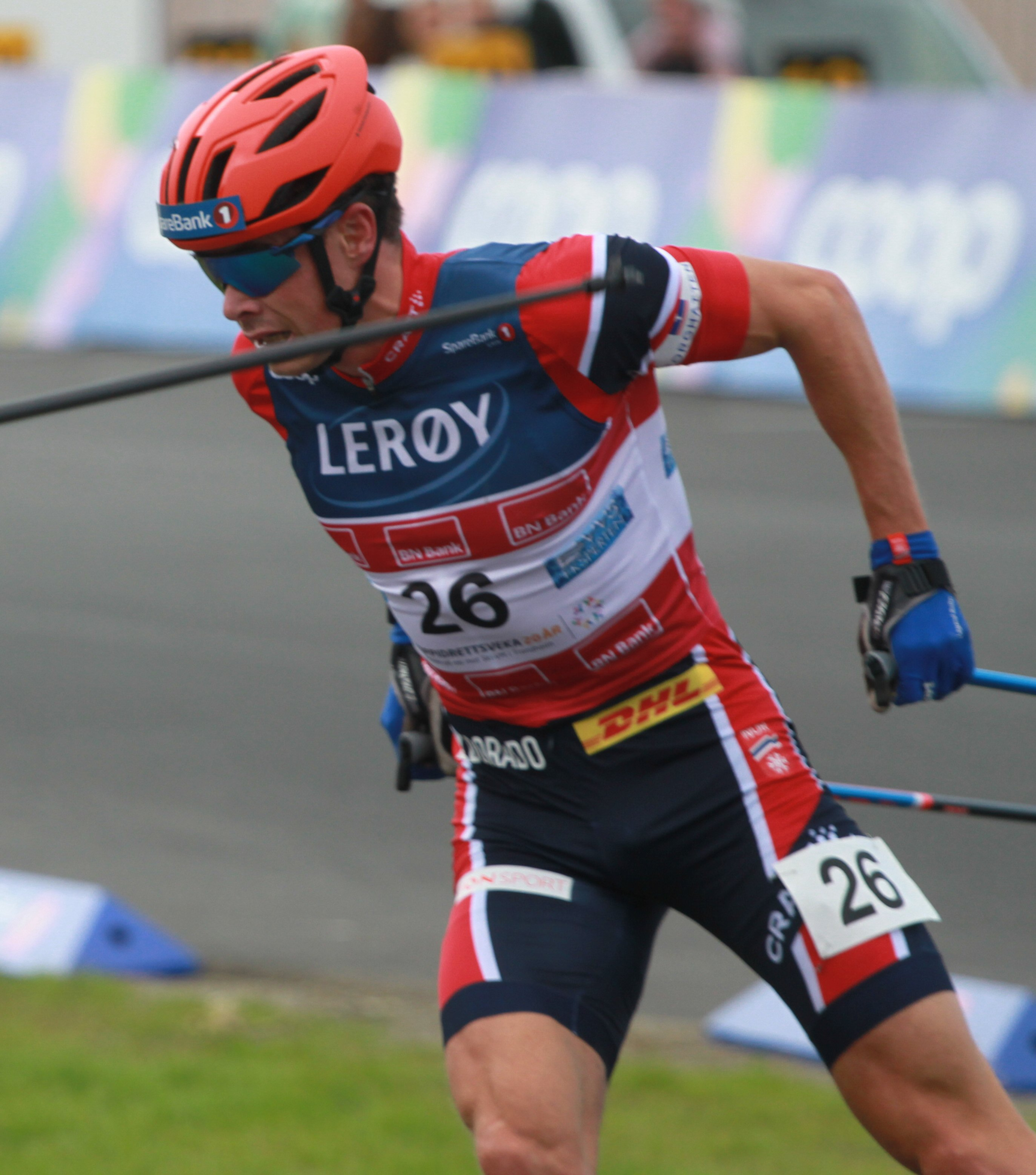
- Amundsen in 2024

Personal information
- Nationality: Norway
- Born: 18 September 1998 (age 27)

Sport
- Sport: Skiing
- Club: Asker SK

World Cup career
- Seasons: 7 – (2019–present)
- Indiv. starts: 103
- Indiv. podiums: 32
- Indiv. wins: 12
- Team starts: 7
- Team podiums: 5
- Team wins: 1
- Overall titles: 1 – (2024)
- Discipline titles: 1 – (DI in 2024)
Medal record
Men's cross-country skiing
Representing Norway
World Championships
Gold medal – first place	2025 Trondheim	4 × 7.5 km relay
Silver medal – second place	2023 Planica	15 km freestyle
Bronze medal – third place	2021 Oberstdorf	15 km freestyle
Bronze medal – third place	2025 Trondheim	20 km skiathlon
Bronze medal – third place	2025 Trondheim	10 km classical
U23 World Championships
Gold medal – first place	2020 Oberwiesenthal	30 km freestyle
Gold medal – first place	2020 Oberwiesenthal	4 × 5 km mixed relay
Silver medal – second place	2020 Oberwiesenthal	15 km classical
Bronze medal – third place	2020 Oberwiesenthal	Individual sprint
Junior World Championships
Gold medal – first place	2017 Park City	4 × 5 km relay
Gold medal – first place	2018 Goms	20 km skiathlon
Gold medal – first place	2018 Goms	4 × 5 km relay
Bronze medal – third place	2017 Park City	20 km skiathlon
- Updated on 22 March 2026

Harald Østberg Amundsen (born 18 September 1998) is a Norwegian cross-country skier.

At the 2017 Junior World Championships he won a relay gold medal and a skiathlon bronze medal, following up with gold medals in both events at the 2018 Junior World Championships. He made his World Cup debut in December 2018 at Beitostølen, where he also collected his first World Cup point with a 30th place in the 30 kilometres race. At the 2020 Under-23 World Championships in Oberwiesenthal, Amundsen won three individual medals; one of them the gold medal at the 30 km freestyle event.

He represents the sports club Asker SK. He is the twin brother of Hedda Østberg Amundsen.

== Cross-country skiing results ==
All results are sourced from the International Ski Federation (FIS).

=== Olympic Games ===
Year	Age	10 km individual	20 km skiathlon	50 km mass start	Sprint	4 × 7.5 km relay	Team sprint
2026	27	4	6	DNF	14	—	—

=== World Championships ===
- 5 medals – (1 gold, 1 silver, 3 bronze)

Year	Age	10/15 km individual	20/30 km skiathlon	50 km mass start	Sprint	4 × 7.5/10 km relay	Team sprint
2021	22	Bronze	—	—	—	—	—
2023	24	Silver	—	—	—	—	—
2025	26	Bronze	Bronze	5	—	Gold	—

=== World Cup ===
==== Season standings ====
Season	Age	Discipline standings				Ski Tour standings			
Season	Age	Overall	Distance	Sprint	U23	Nordic Opening	Tour de Ski	Ski Tour 2020	World Cup Final
2019	20	145	100	—	27	—	—	—N/a	—
2020	21	128	83	—	9	—	—	—	—N/a
2021	22	65	41	—	7	—	—	—N/a	—N/a
2022	23	8	9	29	—N/a	—N/a	9	—N/a	—N/a
2023	24	16	10	27	—N/a	—N/a	—	—N/a	—N/a
2024	25	1st place, gold medalist(s)	1st place, gold medalist(s)	5	—N/a	—N/a	1st place, gold medalist(s)	—N/a	—N/a
2025	26	5	4	15	—N/a	—N/a	DNF	—N/a	—N/a
2026	27	2nd place, silver medalist(s)	2nd place, silver medalist(s)	12	—N/a	—N/a	3rd place, bronze medalist(s)	—N/a	—N/a

==== Individual podiums ====
- 12 victories – (8 WC, 4 SWC)
- 32 podiums – (27 WC, 5 SWC)

No.	Season	Date	Location	Race	Level	Place
1	2021–22	12 March 2022	Falun, Sweden	15 km Individual F	World Cup	3rd
2	2022–23	27 January 2023	Les Rousses, France	10 km Individual F	World Cup	1st
3	2022–23	17 March 2023	Falun, Sweden	10 km Individual C	World Cup	3rd
4	2023–24	26 November 2023	Rukatunturi, Finland	20 km Mass Start F	World Cup	3rd
5	2023–24	2 December 2023	Gällivare, Sweden	10 km Individual F	World Cup	2nd
6	2023–24	10 December 2023	Östersund, Sweden	10 km Individual F	World Cup	1st
7	2023–24	15 December 2023	Trondheim, Norway	1.4 km Sprint F	World Cup	3rd
8	2023–24	31 December 2023	Toblach, Italy	10 km Individual C	Stage World Cup	3rd
9	2023–24	1 January 2024	Toblach, Italy	20 km Pursuit F	Stage World Cup	1st
10	2023–24	4 January 2024	Davos, Switzerland	20 km Pursuit C	Stage World Cup	1st
11	2023–24	30 December 2023 – 7 January 2024	(Italy) (Switzerland) (Italy) Tour de Ski	Overall Standings	World Cup	1st
12	2023–24	9 February 2024	Canmore, Canada	15 km Mass Start F	World Cup	2nd
13	2023–24	18 February 2024	(United States) Minneapolis, USA - Stifel Loppet Cup	10 km Individual F	World Cup	2nd
14	2023–24	15 March 2024	Falun, Sweden	1.4 km Sprint C	World Cup	3rd
15	2024–25	29 November 2024	Rukatunturi, Finland	10 km Individual C	World Cup	2nd
16	2024–25	1 December 2024	Rukatunturi, Finland	20 km Mass Start F	World Cup	1st
17	2024–25	6 December 2024	Lillehammer, Norway	10 km Individual F	World Cup	3rd
18	2024–25	8 December 2024	Lillehammer, Norway	10 km + 10 km Skiathlon C/F	World Cup	1st
19	2024–25	31 December 2024	Toblach, Italy	20 km Individual F	Stage World Cup	1st
20	2024–25	1 January 2025	Toblach, Italy	15 km Pursuit C	Stage World Cup	1st
21	2024–25	2 February 2025	Cogne, Italy	10 km Individual F	World Cup	1st
22	2024–25	16 February 2025	Falun, Sweden	20 km Mass Start F	World Cup	3rd
23	2024–25	16 March 2025	Oslo, Norway	10 km Individual F	World Cup	1st
24	2024–25	19 March 2025	Tallinn, Estonia	1.4 km Sprint F	World Cup	2nd
25	2025–26	30 November 2025	Rukatunturi, Finland	20 km Mass Start F	World Cup	1st
26	2025–26	6 December 2025	Trondheim, Norway	10 km + 10 km Skiathlon C/F	World Cup	2nd
27	2025–26	14 December 2025	Davos, Switzerland	10 km Individual F	World Cup	2nd
28	2025–26	28 December 2025 – 4 January 2026	(Italy) Tour de Ski	Overall Standings	World Cup	3rd
29	2025–26	25 January 2026	Goms, Switzerland	20 km Mass Start C	World Cup	3rd
30	2025–26	1 March 2026	Falun, Sweden	10 km + 10 km Skiathlon C/F	World Cup	2nd
31	2025–26	14 March 2026	Oslo, Norway	50 km Mass Start F	World Cup	2nd
32	2025–26	22 March 2026	(United States) Lake Placid, USA	20 km Mass Start F	World Cup	2nd

==== Team podiums ====
- 1 victories – (1 TS)
- 5 podiums – (2 RL, 3 TS)

No.	Season	Date	Location	Race	Level	Place	Teammate(s)
1	2021–22	5 December 2021	Lillehammer, Norway	4 × 7.5 km Relay C/F	World Cup	3rd	Golberg / Nyenget / Holund
2	2021–22	13 March 2022	Falun, Sweden	12 × 1 km Mixed Team Sprint F	World Cup	3rd	L. Udnes Weng
3	2022–23	5 February 2023	Toblach, Italy	4 × 7.5 km Relay C/F	World Cup	3rd	Røthe / Tønseth / Krüger
4	2022–23	24 March 2023	Lahti, Finland	6 × 1.4 km Team Sprint F	World Cup	3rd	Skar
5	2025–26	23 January 2026	Goms, Switzerland	6 × 1.5 km Team Sprint F	World Cup	1st	Hedegart
