= Fredrik Fodstad =

Norwegian-Colombian cross-country skier

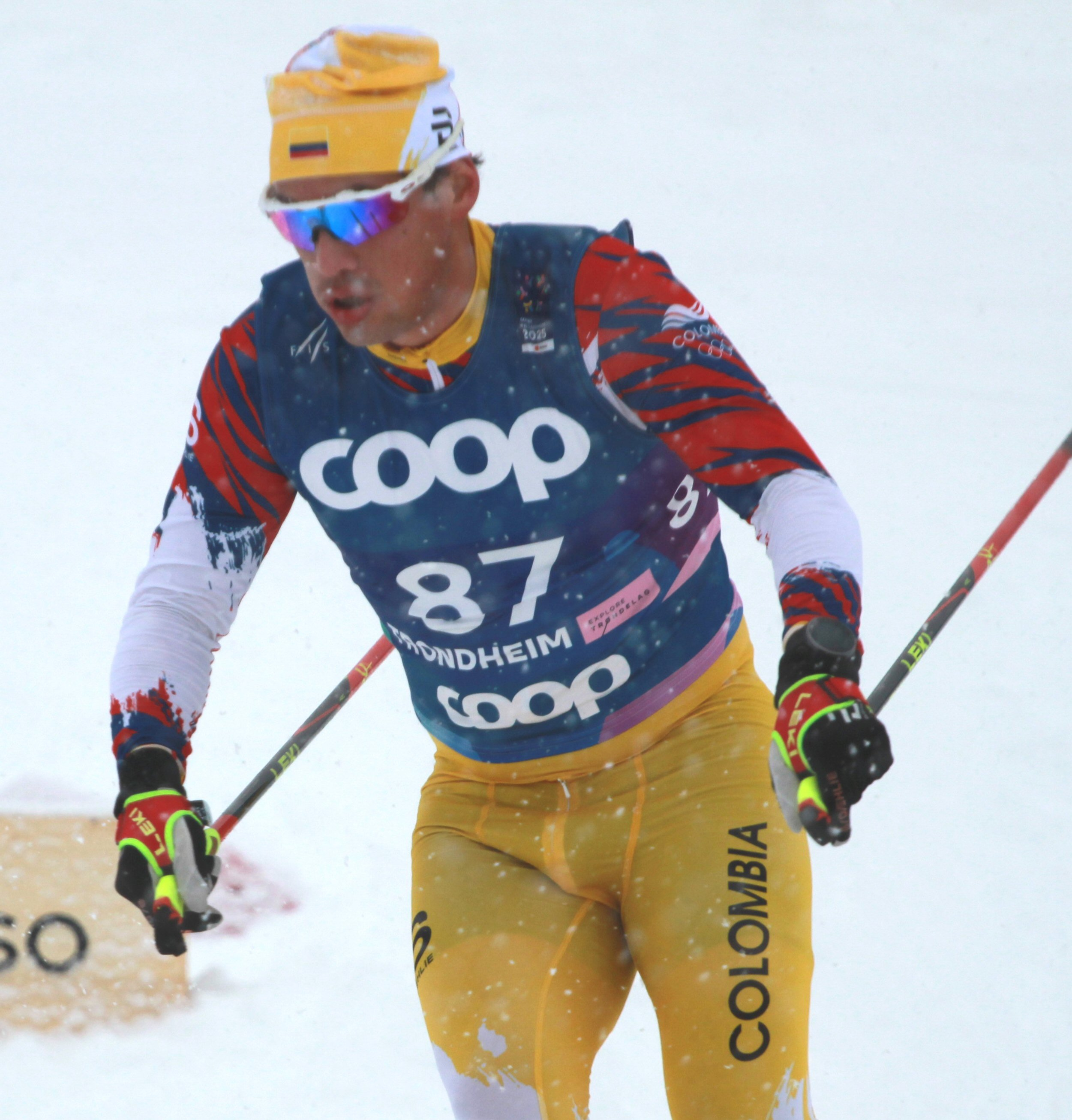

Personal information
- Nationality: Colombia
- Born: Fredrik Gerardo Fodstad; 7 January 2001 (age 25) Bogotá, Colombia

Sport
- Sport: Cross-country skiing
- Club: Lillehammer SK

Achievements and titles
- Olympic finals: 2026 Winter Olympics
- Updated on February 2026

Fredrik Gerardo Fodstad (born 7 January 2001) is a Colombian and Norwegian cross-country skier. He was the sole representative and flag bearer of Colombia at the 2026 Winter Olympics.

== Biography ==
Fodstad was adopted as an infant from Bogotá, Colombia, and raised in Eidsvoll, Norway. With his parents' encouragement, he began to ski at age three or four. As a child, Fodstad skied for Eidsvold Værks Skiklub. He moved to Lillehammer to attend high school and joined Lillehammer SK.

When he was 15 or 16 years old, he began thinking about his Colombian heritage and considering representing Colombia in international competition. In 2020, Fodstad began speaking with Remi Padoin of Colombia's national ski team; he began representing Colombia in 2021. Fodstad participated in the 2022–23 FIS Cross-Country World Cup; in his first appearance, he placed 64th in the men's classic sprint race. He achieved his best result in an FIS race on 22 February 2023, placing 7th in the men's 10-kilometre (6.2 mi) free.

At the 2026 Winter Olympics, Fodstad – being the sole Colombian representative – was the flag bearer. He competed in the men's sprint, where he placed 83rd; and in the men's skiathlon, where he placed 69th.
