= Truls Gisselman =

Swedish cross-country skier (born 2001)

Personal information
- Nationality: Sweden
- Born: 8 June 2001 (age 25) Bollnäs, Sweden

Sport
- Sport: Skiing
- Club: Rehns Bk

Truls Gisselman (8 June 2001) is a Swedish cross-country skier. At the FIS Nordic World Ski Championships 2025 he won a bronze medal in the 4 × 7.5 kilometre relay. Gisselman placed seventh in the 20 kilometre skiathlon at the 2026 Winter Olympics.
