= Imanol Rojo =

Spanish cross-country skier (born 1990)

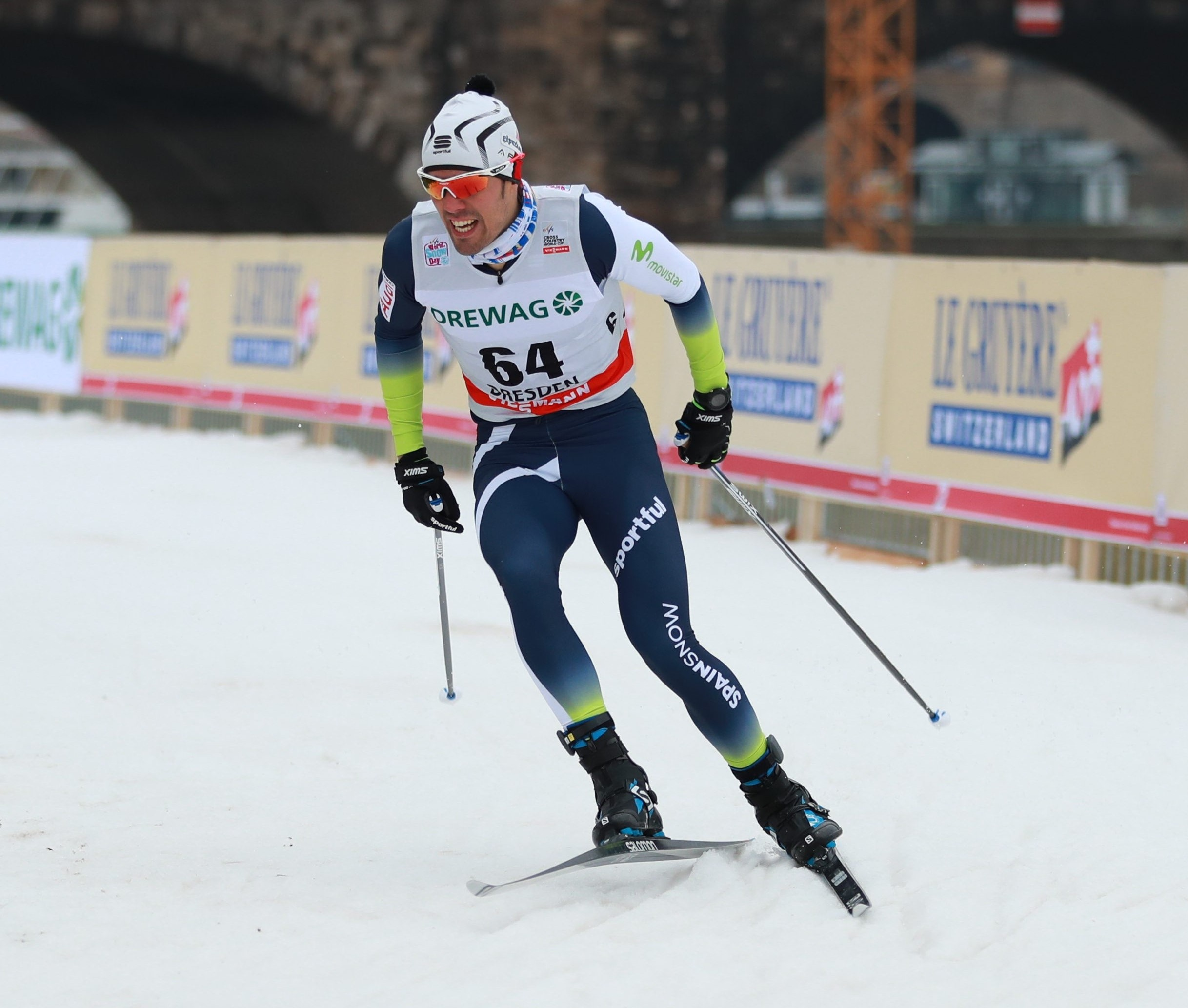
- Rojo in 2018

Personal information
- Full name: Imanol Rojo García
- Nationality: Spain
- Born: 30 November 1990 (age 35) Tolosa, Basque Country, Spain

Sport
- Sport: Skiing
- Club: Alpino Uzturre-Rfedi

World Cup career
- Seasons: 10 – (2013–2016, 2018–present)
- Indiv. starts: 90
- Indiv. podiums: 0
- Team starts: 2
- Team podiums: 0
- Overall titles: 0 – (86th in 2021)
- Discipline titles: 0
- Updated on 29 March 2023

Imanol Rojo García (born 30 November 1990) is a cross-country skier from Spain. He competed for Spain in the 2014, 2018 and 2022 Winter Olympics cross country skiing events.

== Cross-country skiing results ==
All results are sourced from the International Ski Federation (FIS).

=== Olympic Games ===
Year	Age	15 km individual	30 km skiathlon	50 km mass start	Sprint	4 × 10 km relay	Team sprint
2014	23	50	49	33	60	—	—
2018	27	62	49	35	—	—	19
2022	31	39	21	21^{[a]}	—	—	—

^{a} Distance reduced to 30 km due to weather conditions.

=== World Championships ===
Year	Age	15 km individual	30 km skiathlon	50 km mass start	Sprint	4 × 10 km relay	Team sprint
2013	22	81	66	—	—	—	—
2015	24	64	53	DNF	—	—	—
2017	26	—	53	DNF	74	—	—
2019	28	48	41	40	—	—	—
2021	30	33	19	18	—	—	—
2023	32	40	—	42	—	—	—

=== World Cup ===
==== Season standings ====
Season	Age	Discipline standings			Ski Tour standings				
Season	Age	Overall	Distance	Sprint	Nordic Opening	Tour de Ski	Ski Tour 2020	World Cup Final	Ski Tour Canada
2013	22	NC	NC	NC	DNF	—	—N/a	—	—N/a
2014	23	NC	NC	NC	—	—	—N/a	—	—N/a
2015	24	NC	NC	NC	91	DNF	—N/a	—N/a	—N/a
2016	25	NC	NC	NC	—	—	—N/a	—N/a	—
2018	27	NC	NC	NC	76	—	—N/a	—	—N/a
2019	28	NC	NC	NC	75	—	—N/a	—	—N/a
2020	29	107	82	NC	—	37	46	—N/a	—N/a
2021	30	86	64	NC	—	31	—N/a	—N/a	—N/a
2022	31	88	53	NC	—N/a	42	—N/a	—N/a	—N/a
2023	32	139	83	NC	—N/a	51	—N/a	—N/a	—N/a
2024	33	113	105	NC	—N/a	35	—N/a	—N/a	—N/a
2025	34				—N/a	DNF	—N/a	—N/a	—N/a
