= Zanden McMullen =

American cross-country skier (born 2001)

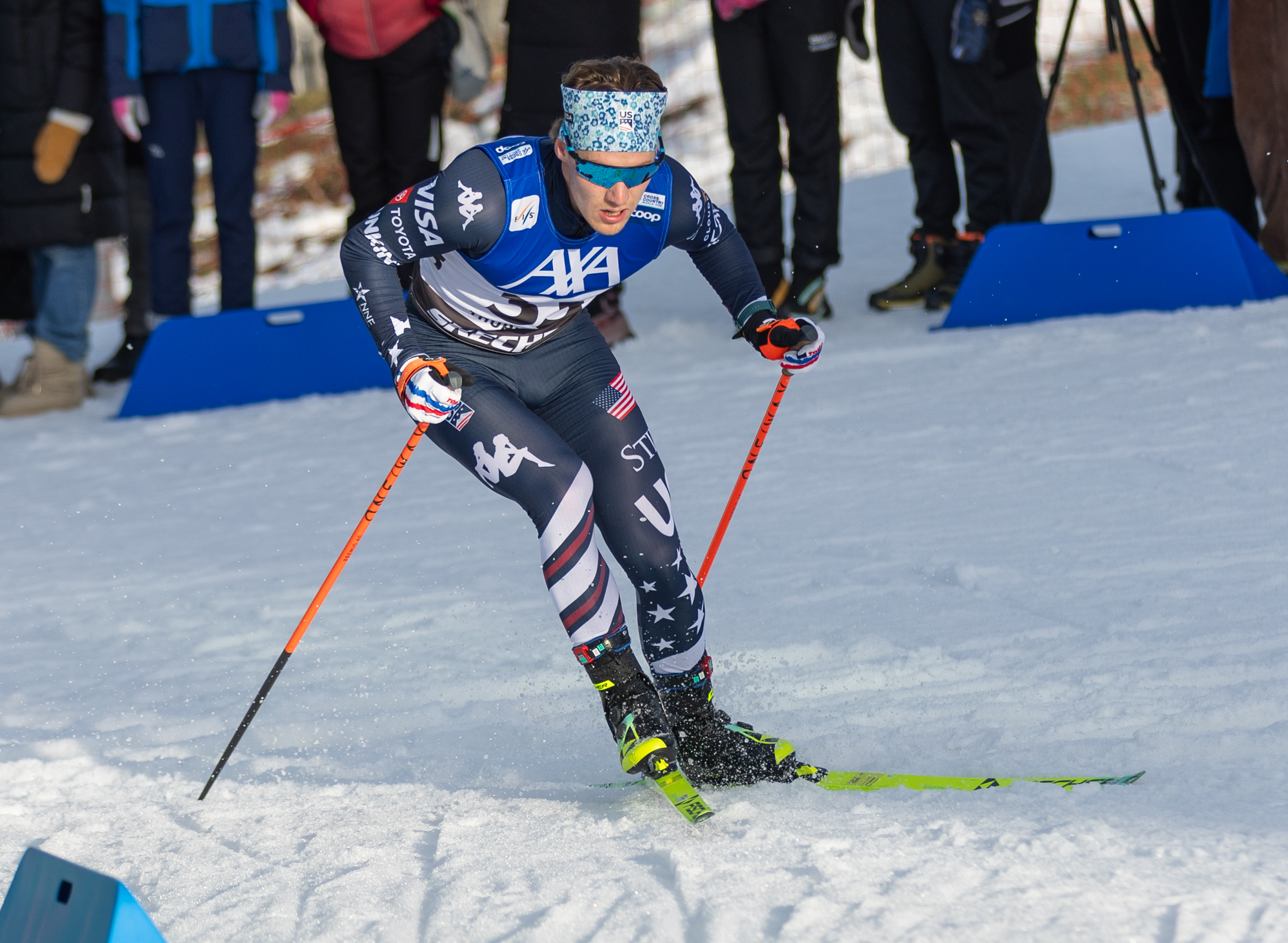
- McMullen in 2026

Personal information
- Born: May 31, 2001 (age 25) Anchorage, Alaska, U.S.

Sport
- Sport: Skiing

Zanden McMullen (born May 31, 2001) is an American cross-country skier who represents the United States in international competitions, including the 2026 Winter Olympics. He has competed in the FIS Cross-Country World Cup and at the FIS Nordic World Ski Championships, and is a member of the United States national cross-country ski team.

McMullen emerged as one of the leading young American distance skiers in the mid-2020s, achieving multiple top-30 finishes on the World Cup circuit and winning national titles at the U.S. Cross-Country Championships.

== Early life and education ==
McMullen was born in Anchorage, Alaska. He attended South Anchorage High School and began cross-country skiing at a young age, encouraged by his family and the strong Nordic skiing culture in Alaska.

He later competed collegiately for Montana State University, where he studied chemical engineering and qualified multiple times for the NCAA Skiing Championships.

== Career ==
=== Junior and collegiate career ===
McMullen competed in international junior competitions and participated in the FIS Junior World Ski Championships, gaining experience against top young athletes in the sport.

During his collegiate career with the Montana State Bobcats, he consistently recorded top finishes in NCAA and regional competitions and qualified for the NCAA Championships.

=== International competition ===
McMullen made his FIS Cross-Country World Cup debut in November 2021 in Ruka, Finland.

He later developed into a regular competitor on the World Cup circuit. During the 2023–24 season he recorded numerous top-30 finishes and finished among the top competitors in the under-23 World Cup standings.

In 2024 he achieved a career-best World Cup result with a seventh-place finish in the 20 km race in Ruka, Finland.

=== National championships ===
At the 2026 U.S. Cross-Country Ski Championships in Lake Placid, McMullen won the 20-kilometer freestyle mass start and also captured victory in the classic sprint, performances that strengthened his position on the national team.

=== Olympics ===
McMullen represented the United States at the 2026 Winter Olympics in Milan–Cortina, competing in cross-country skiing events.

== Personal life ==
McMullen trains with the Alaska Pacific University Nordic Ski Center and has cited the competitive ski environment in Alaska as an important influence on his development as an athlete.
