= Bolivia at the 1988 Winter Olympics =

- Flag of Bolivia
- IOC code: BOL
- NOC: Bolivian Olympic Committee
- Website: www.cobol.org.bo (in Spanish)

in Calgary
- Competitors: 6 (men) in 1 sport
- Flag bearer: Guillermo Avila (alpine skiing)
- Medals: Gold 0 Silver 0 Bronze 0 Total 0

Winter Olympics appearances (overview)
- 1956; 1960–1976; 1980; 1984; 1988; 1992; 1994–2014; 2018; 2022; 2026; 2030

Bolivia competed at the 1988 Winter Olympics in Calgary, Alberta, Canada.

== Competitors ==
The following is the list of number of competitors in the Games.

Sport	Men	Women	Total
Alpine skiing	6	0	6
Total	6	0	6

== Alpine skiing ==
Men

Athlete	Event	Race 1	Race 2	Total	
Athlete	Event	Time	Time	Time	Rank
Enrique Montano	Giant Slalom	DSQ	–	DSQ	–
Jaime Bascon	Giant Slalom	DSQ	–	DSQ	–
Guillermo Avila	Giant Slalom	DSQ	–	DSQ	–
José-Manuel Bejarano	Giant Slalom	1:39.50	DNF	DNF	–
Enrique Montano	Slalom	1:44.04	1:23.37	3:07.41	53
Luis Viscarra	Slalom	1:30.45	1:23.93	2:54.38	50
Manuel Aramayo	Slalom	1:24.85	1:17.46	2:42.31	46
Guillermo Avila	Slalom	1:16.57	1:07.83	2:24.40	38
