= Bolivia at the 1992 Winter Olympics =

- IOC code: BOL
- NOC: Bolivian Olympic Committee
- Website: www.cobol.org.bo (in Spanish)

in Albertville
- Competitors: 5 (men) in 1 sport
- Flag bearer: Guillermo Avila
- Medals: Gold 0 Silver 0 Bronze 0 Total 0

Winter Olympics appearances (overview)
- 1956; 1960–1976; 1980; 1984; 1988; 1992; 1994–2014; 2018; 2022; 2026; 2030

Bolivia competed at the 1992 Winter Olympics in Albertville, France.

== Competitors ==
The following is the list of number of competitors in the Games.

Sport	Men	Women	Total
Alpine skiing	5	0	5
Total	5	0	5

== Alpine skiing ==
Men

Athlete	Event	Race 1	Race 2	Total	
Athlete	Event	Time	Time	Time	Rank
Carlos Aramayo	Giant Slalom	1:38.83	1:45.46	3:24.29	87
José-Manuel Bejarano	Giant Slalom	1:36.47	1:50.88	3:27.35	89
Daniel Stahle	Giant Slalom	1:33.56	1:38.80	3:12.36	83
Guillermo Avila	Giant Slalom	1:24.68	1:26.09	2:50.77	77
José-Manuel Bejarano	Slalom	1:30.13	1:24.55	2:54.68	59
Manuel Aramayo	Slalom	1:27.27	1:25.29	2:52.56	57
Daniel Stahle	Slalom	1:23.45	1:24.97	2:48.42	56
Guillermo Avila	Slalom	1:13.94	1:14.31	2:28.25	50
