= Aramayo =

Aramayo is a surname. Notable people with the surname include:

- Carlos Víctor Aramayo (1889–1981), Bolivian industrialist and politician
- Carlos Aramayo (alpine skier) (born 1972), Bolivian skier
- Fernando Aramayo (born 1974), Bolivian economist
- Manuel Aramayo (1955–1999), Bolivian skier
- Omar Aramayo (born 1947), Peruvian poet and composer
- Robert Aramayo (born 1992), English actor
