= Bolivia at the 1980 Winter Olympics =

- IOC code: BOL
- NOC: Bolivian Olympic Committee
- Website: www.cobol.org.bo (in Spanish)

in Lake Placid
- Competitors: 3 (men) in 1 sport
- Medals: Gold 0 Silver 0 Bronze 0 Total 0

Winter Olympics appearances (overview)
- 1956; 1960–1976; 1980; 1984; 1988; 1992; 1994–2014; 2018; 2022; 2026; 2030

Bolivia competed at the 1980 Winter Olympics in Lake Placid, United States. It was the first time in 24 years that Bolivian athletes had competed at the Winter Games.

== Alpine skiing ==
Men

Athlete	Event	Race 1		Race 2		Total	
Athlete	Event	Time	Rank	Time	Rank	Time	Rank
Scott Sánchez	Downhill					DSQ	–
Billy Farwig	Downhill					2:12.66	42
Scott Sánchez	Giant Slalom	DNF	–	–	–	DNF	–
Billy Farwig	Giant Slalom	DNF	–	–	–	DNF	–
Victor Hugo Ascarrunz	Giant Slalom	DNF	–	–	–	DNF	–
Scott Sánchez	Slalom	DNF	–	–	–	DNF	–
Billy Farwig	Slalom	DNF	–	–	–	DNF	–
Victor Hugo Ascarrunz	Slalom	DNF	–	–	–	DNF	–
