= Bolivia at the 1956 Winter Olympics =

- The flag of Bolivia
- IOC code: BOL
- NOC: Bolivian Olympic Committee

in Cortina d'Ampezzo
- Competitors: 1 (man) in 1 sport
- Flag bearer: René Farwig
- Medals: Gold 0 Silver 0 Bronze 0 Total 0

Winter Olympics appearances (overview)
- 1956; 1960–1976; 1980; 1984; 1988; 1992; 1994–2014; 2018; 2022; 2026

Bolivia sent a delegation to compete in the Winter Olympic Games for the first time at the 1956 Winter Olympics in Cortina d'Ampezzo, Italy, from 26 January to 5 February 1956. The only competitor in the delegation was alpine skier René Farwig. In the men's giant slalom he came in 75th place, and he was disqualified from the men's slalom. It would be 24 years before Bolivia returned to the Winter Olympics, at the 1980 Winter Olympics.

== Background ==
The Bolivian Olympic Committee was recognized by the International Olympic Committee on 31 December 1935. This was Bolivia's second appearance at an Olympics, after the 1936 Summer Olympics, and their first at a Winter Olympics. As of 2018, Bolivia has never won an Olympic medal. The 1956 Winter Olympics were held between 26 January and 5 February 1956; a total of 821 athletes represented 32 National Olympic Committees. Bolivia's delegation consisted of a single alpine skier, René Farwig. He was the flag bearer for the opening ceremony. It would be 24 years before Bolivia participated in another Winter Olympics; they took part in the 1980 Lake Placid Games, though they made their third overall Olympic appearance just eight years later, at the 1964 Summer Olympics.

== Alpine skiing ==
René Farwig was 20 years old at the time of the Cortina d'Ampezzo Olympics, and was making his only Olympic appearance. The men's giant slalom was held on 29 January, and Farwig finished the race in a time of 4 minutes and 15 seconds, placing him in a tie for 75th place out of 87 classified finishers; the gold medal was won by Toni Sailer of Austria in a time of 3 minutes and 0.1 seconds. It was an Austrian sweep of the medal stand, with Anderl Molterer taking silver and Walter Schuster taking the bronze medal. Two days later, as one of 89 competitors in the men's slalom, Farwig was disqualified during the first run for reasons unspecified in the official report of the Games. In the slalom, Salier won another gold medal, while Chiharu Igaya of Japan took silver and Stig Sollander of Sweden won the bronze medal.

Athlete	Event	Race 1		Race 2		Total	
Athlete	Event	Time	Rank	Time	Rank	Time	Rank
René Farwig	Men's giant slalom					4:15.0	75
René Farwig	Men's slalom	DSQ	–	–	–	DSQ	–
