= Bolivia at the 2022 Winter Olympics =

- Flag of Bolivia
- IOC code: BOL
- NOC: Bolivian Olympic Committee
- Website: www.cobol.org.bo (in Spanish)

in Beijing, China 4–20 February 2022
- Competitors: 2 (2 men and 0 women) in 2 sports
- Flag bearer (opening): Simon Breitfuss Kammerlander
- Flag bearer (closing): Volunteer
- Medals: Gold 0 Silver 0 Bronze 0 Total 0

Winter Olympics appearances (overview)
- 1956; 1960–1976; 1980; 1984; 1988; 1992; 1994–2014; 2018; 2022; 2026; 2030

Bolivia competed at the 2022 Winter Olympics in Beijing, China, from 4 to 20 February 2022.

Bolivia's team consisted of two men competing in two sports. Simon Breitfuss Kammerlander was the country's flagbearer during the opening ceremony. Meanwhile a volunteer was the flagbearer during the closing ceremony.

== Competitors ==
The following is the list of number of competitors who participated at the Games per sport/discipline.

Sport	Men	Women	Total
Alpine skiing	1	0	1
Cross-country skiing	1	0	1
Total	2	0	2

== Alpine skiing ==
By meeting the basic qualification standards, Bolivia has qualified one male alpine skier.

Athlete	Event	Run 1		Run 2		Total	
Athlete	Event	Time	Rank	Time	Rank	Time	Rank
Simon Breitfuss Kammerlander	Men's downhill	—				1:48.26	34
Simon Breitfuss Kammerlander	Men's super-G	—				DNF	

== Cross-country skiing ==
By meeting the basic qualification standards, Bolivia has qualified one male cross-country skier.

Distance

Athlete	Event	Final		
Athlete	Event	Time	Deficit	Rank
Timo Juhani Grönlund	Men's 15 km classical	49:27.0	+11:32.2	89

== See also ==
- Tropical nations at the Winter Olympics
