= Bolivia at the 2018 Winter Olympics =

- Flag of Bolivia
- IOC code: BOL
- NOC: Bolivian Olympic Committee
- Website: www.cobol.org.bo (in Spanish)

in Pyeongchang, South Korea 9–25 February 2018
- Competitors: 2 in 2 sports
- Flag bearer: Simon Breitfuss Kammerlander (opening)
- Medals: Gold 0 Silver 0 Bronze 0 Total 0

Winter Olympics appearances (overview)
- 1956; 1960–1976; 1980; 1984; 1988; 1992; 1994–2014; 2018; 2022; 2026

Bolivia competed at the 2018 Winter Olympics in Pyeongchang, South Korea, from 9 to 25 February 2018. The country returned to the Winter Olympics after last competing in 1992 in Albertville, France, a span of 26 years.

The official Bolivian team of two athletes competing in two sports was unveiled on January 18, 2018 at the South Korean embassy in La Paz. During this event it was also announced that alpine skier Simon Breitfuss Kammerlander would be the country's flag bearer during the opening ceremony.

== Competitors ==
The following is the list of number of competitors participating in the Bolivian delegation per sport.

Sport	Men	Women	Total
Alpine skiing	1	0	1
Cross-country skiing	1	0	1
Total	2	0	2

== Alpine skiing ==
Bolivia qualified one male athlete, Austrian born skier Simon Breitfuss Kammerlander. Kammerlander first visited Bolivia when he was 8 years old, due to his father's work as a ski coach in neighboring Argentina. In 2009 Kammerlander met officials from the Bolivian Ski Federation, while studying in the country. In 2015 Kammerlander was officially given Bolivian citizenship, allowing him to compete for the country.

Athlete	Event	Run 1		Run 2		Total	
Athlete	Event	Time	Rank	Time	Rank	Time	Rank
Simon Breitfuss Kammerlander	Men's combined	1:22.94	49	DNF			
Simon Breitfuss Kammerlander	Men's downhill	—N/a				1:47.87	47
Simon Breitfuss Kammerlander	Men's giant slalom	1:16.27	52	1:15.98	44	2:32.25	43
Simon Breitfuss Kammerlander	Men's slalom	54.66	40	55.76	31	1:50.42	32
Simon Breitfuss Kammerlander	Men's super-G	—N/a				1:31.69	45

== Cross-country skiing ==
Bolivia qualified one male athlete, Finnish born skier Timo Juhani Grönlund. This will also mark Bolivia's Winter Olympics debut in the sport.

Distance

Athlete	Event	Final		
Athlete	Event	Time	Deficit	Rank
Timo Juhani Grönlund	Men's 15 km freestyle	43:18.4	+9:34.5	106

== See also ==
- Bolivia at the 2018 Summer Youth Olympics
