= Great Britain at the 2026 Winter Olympics =

- Flag of the United Kingdom
- IOC code: GBR
- NOC: British Olympic Association
- Website: www.teamgb.com

in Milan and Cortina d'Ampezzo, Italy 6 February 2026 – 22 February 2026
- Competitors: 53 (30 men and 23 women) in 11 sports
- Flag bearers (opening): Lilah Fear & Brad Hall
- Flag bearers (closing): Matt Weston & Charlotte Bankes
- Medals Ranked 15th: Gold 3 Silver 1 Bronze 1 Total 5

Winter Olympics appearances (overview)
- 1924; 1928; 1932; 1936; 1948; 1952; 1956; 1960; 1964; 1968; 1972; 1976; 1980; 1984; 1988; 1992; 1994; 1998; 2002; 2006; 2010; 2014; 2018; 2022; 2026

Great Britain competed at the 2026 Winter Olympics in Milan and Cortina d'Ampezzo, Italy, from 6 to 22 February 2026. A total of 53 athletes (30 men and 23 women) were selected to compete at the Games. Great Britain finished 15th in the medal table after winning five medals in total: three gold, one silver and one bronze. Team GB's medal table finishing position was an improvement of four places over their position in the previous four Winter Olympic Games where they had come 19th each time. The total of five medals won was the joint best haul for a British team at Winter Olympics, matching the five achieved in 2014 in Sochi and in 2018 in PyeongChang. This was the first Winter Olympics where Great Britain won multiple gold medals, making it Great Britains' most successful Winter Olympics by that metric.

For the first time, Great Britain won more than one gold medal at a single Winter Olympic Games, when Charlotte Bankes and Huw Nightingale secured gold in the mixed relay snowboard cross event, to add to the gold won by Matt Weston in the men's individual skeleton. It was Britain's first ever Olympic gold medal on snow, as all previous gold medals had been won on ice.

Weston's gold made him the first British male to win Winter Olympic gold since Christopher Dean in 1984, and the first individual male to win gold for Great Britain since Robin Cousins in 1980, both in figure skating.

Hours after Bankes and Nightingale's victory, Weston, with Tabitha Stoecker, won the skeleton mixed team event for an unprecedented third gold at a single Games for Great Britain. Stoecker, who was competing at her first Winter Olympics, became the third British female skeleton racer in history to win a gold medal, after Amy Williams and Lizzy Yarnold.

Simultaneously, Weston became the first Winter Olympic athlete to win multiple golds at a single Games for Great Britain, the most successful male skeleton rider in Olympic history, and the joint most successful British Winter Olympic athlete, alongside fellow skeleton champion Yarnold.

On 19 February, the men's curling team led by Bruce Mouat won their semi-final match against Switzerland to reach the final, guaranteeing a fourth medal for Great Britain at the games, thereby meeting the UK Sport medal target of between 4 and 8 medals for the Games. However, Mouat and his team were defeated in the gold medal match by Canada 9–6 meaning the male British curlers would have to settle for silver for the second Olympics in succession. Mouat also suffered disappointment in the mixed doubles event with Jennifer Dodds after finishing fourth after losing the Bronze medal match for the second Olympics in a row. There was also further disappointment for Dodds as the women's curling team were eliminated in the round robin stage failing to make the semi-finals.

On 22 February, Zoe Atkin won bronze in the women's halfpipe, the first ever medal for Britain in this event. This brought GB's total medals to five, equalling their best ever total medal haul. Aktin's sister Izzy Atkin had previously won an Olympic bronze medal for Great Britain at the 2018 games in ski slopestyle

The total of five medals equalled Great Britain's best ever medal haul, and having gained three golds, more than any previous Winter Olympics, made this Great Britain's best ever performance at a Winter Olympics. Great Britain finished 15th in the overall medal table. This was an improvement of four places compared to the 2022 Games. This was Great Britain's best finish on the medal table since the 1984 games in Sarajevo.

== Competitors ==
The following is the list of number of competitors participating at the Games per sport/discipline.

Sport	Men	Women	Total
Alpine skiing	3	0	3
Biathlon	1	1	2
Bobsleigh	4	2	6
Cross-country skiing	3	1	4
Curling	5	5	10
Figure skating	4	4	8
Freestyle skiing	5	3	8
Short-track speed skating	1	0	1
Skeleton	2	3	5
Snowboarding	2	3	5
Speed skating	0	1	1
Total	30	23	53

== Medallists ==
The following British competitors won medals at the Games. In the discipline sections below, the medallists' names are bolded.

Medal	Name	Sport	Event	Date
Gold	Matt Weston	Skeleton	Men's	13 February
Gold	Charlotte Bankes; Huw Nightingale	Snowboarding	Mixed team snowboard cross	15 February
Gold	Matt Weston; Tabitha Stoecker	Skeleton	Mixed team	15 February
Silver	Bruce Mouat; Grant Hardie; Bobby Lammie; Hammy McMillan Jr. Kyle Waddell	Curling	Men's	21 February
Bronze	Zoe Atkin	Freestyle skiing	Women's halfpipe	22 February

=== Multiple Medallists ===
The following British competitors won multiple medals at the Games. This was the first time any athlete had won multiple medals for Team GB at a single Winter Olympic Games.

Name	Medal	Sport	Event
Matt Weston	Gold; Gold	Skeleton	Men's; Mixed team

Medals by date
**Day**	**Date**	1st place, gold medalist(s)	2nd place, silver medalist(s)	3rd place, bronze medalist(s)	**Total**
7	13 February	1	0	0	**1**
9	15 February	2	0	0	**2**
15	21 February	0	1	0	**1**
16	22 February	0	0	1	**1**
Total		3	1	1	5

Medals by sport
Sport	1st place, gold medalist(s)	2nd place, silver medalist(s)	3rd place, bronze medalist(s)	Total
Skeleton	2	0	0	**2**
Snowboarding	1	0	0	**1**
Curling	0	1	0	**1**
Freestyle Skiing	0	0	1	**1**
Total	3	1	1	5

Medals by gender
Gender	1st place, gold medalist(s)	2nd place, silver medalist(s)	3rd place, bronze medalist(s)	Total
Male	1	1	0	**2**
Female	0	0	1	**1**
Mixed	2	0	0	**2**
Total	3	1	0	5

== Medal and performance targets ==
On 13 January 2026, UK Sport set a target of four–eight medals for the Games, reflecting their belief that Team GB is "more competitive in more sports at a winter games than ever before". Great Britain's victory in the semi-final of the men's curling on 19 February guaranteed they would win at least four medals, meeting the target set before the games.

Team GB medal target
Event	Medal target	2018 medals	2022 medals	Medals won	Target met
Overall	4–8	5	2	5	check

== Administration ==
On 17 May 2024, Team GB announced that former curler Eve Muirhead would act as Great Britain's Chef de Mission for the 2026 Olympics. Muirhead had skipped the British women's curling team to gold at the previous Olympics in 2022.

== Alpine skiing ==
Great Britain qualified one female and one male alpine skier through the basic quota. Two further male alpine skiers qualified from being in the Top 30 of the rankings. Following the end of qualification, Great Britain rejected its sole female quota, but accepted the three male quotas.

Athlete	Event	Run 1		Run 2		Total	
Athlete	Event	Time	Rank	Time	Rank	Time	Rank
Dave Ryding	Men's slalom	59.88	19	57.30	13	1:57.48	17
Laurie Taylor	Men's slalom	DNF					
Billy Major	Men's slalom	58.66	13	58.59	19	1:57.25	16

== Biathlon ==
Following the conclusion of the qualification period in Biathlon, Great Britain had qualified two biathletes, one male and one female. Team GB announced its two biathletes on 26 January 2026.

Athlete	Event	Time	Misses	Rank
Jacques Jefferies	Men's sprint	27:02.5	3 (1+2)	81
Jacques Jefferies	Men's individual	1:02:11.0	4 (1+1+1+1)	79
Shawna Pendry	Women's sprint	25:27.8	2 (1+1)	89
Shawna Pendry	Women's individual	54:06.0	7 (1+1+1+4)	88

== Bobsleigh ==
Following the conclusion of the qualification period in Bobsleigh, Great Britain had qualified two sleds in the two-man and four-man disciplines and one sled each in the two-woman and women's monobob disciplines. Team GB chose not to take one of their two four-man sleds.

Athlete	Event	Run 1		Run 2		Run 3		Run 4		Total	
Athlete	Event	Time	Rank	Time	Rank	Time	Rank	Time	Rank	Time	Rank
Brad Hall; Taylor Lawrence	Two-man	55.65	8	55.89	8	55.72	11	56.17	18	3:43.43	12
Brad Hall; Taylor Lawrence; Greg Cackett; Leon Greenwood	Four-man	54.39	3	55.04	12	54.66	6	55.03	10	3:39.12	7
Adele Nicoll	Monobob	1:00.54	16	1:00.29	10	1:00.00	12	1:01.03	20	4:01.86	18
Adele Nicoll; Ashleigh Nelson	Two-woman	58.03	20	57.97	21	58.03	11	57.80	11	3:51.83	15

Alex Cartagena (male) and Kya Placide (female) were travelling reserves able to replace ill or injured competitors.

== Cross-country skiing ==
Great Britain qualified one female and one male cross-country skier through the basic quota. Following the completion of the 2024–25 FIS Cross-Country World Cup, Great Britain qualified a further two male athletes. Andrew Musgrave returned for his fifth Winter Olympics, a British record.

Musgrave's sixth-place finish in the 10 km freestyle beat his previous best of seventh in the 30 km skiathlon in 2018, becoming Great Britain's best result ever in cross-country skiing at the Olympics. Musgrave then beat his own record again by finishing fifth alongside James Clugnet in the team sprint, where they finished 4.3 seconds away from a medal.

Meanwhile, Anna Pryce's 24th-place finish in the women's 10 km freestyle marked the best ever result for a British woman at the Olympics in cross-country skiing.

Distance

Athlete	Event	Classical		Freestyle		Total	
Athlete	Event	Time	Rank	Time	Rank	Time	Rank
Andrew Musgrave	Men's skiathlon	24:34.0	13	22:26.9	7	47:00.5	10
Andrew Musgrave	Men's 10 km freestyle	—		21:06.3	6	21:06.3	6
Andrew Musgrave	Men's 50 km classical	2:10:43.5	6	—		2:10:43.5	6
Joe Davies	Men's skiathlon	24:36.6	19	22:59.5	16	47:35.9	16
Joe Davies	Men's 10 km freestyle	—		21:40.2	12	21:40.2	12
Joe Davies	Men's 50 km classical	2:14:52.7	16	—		2:14:52.7	16
James Clugnet	Men's 10 km freestyle	—		22.20.5	34	22:50.0	34
Anna Pryce	Women's skiathlon	30:42.2	36	30:27.3	47	1:01:09.5	42
Anna Pryce	Women's 10 km freestyle	—		24:55.1	24	24:55.1	24

Sprint

Athlete	Event	Qualification		Quarterfinal		Semifinal		Final	
Athlete	Event	Time	Rank	Time	Rank	Time	Rank	Time	Rank
James Clugnet	Men's sprint	3:23.66	45	Did not advance					
Anna Pryce	Women's sprint	3:50.88	32	Did not advance					
Andrew Musgrave; James Clugnet	Men's team sprint	5:55.49	13	—N/a				18:36.59	5

== Curling ==
Summary

Team	Event	Group stage										Semifinal	Final / BM	
Team	Event	Opposition Score	Opposition Score	Opposition Score	Opposition Score	Opposition Score	Opposition Score	Opposition Score	Opposition Score	Opposition Score	Rank	Opposition Score	Opposition Score	Rank
Bruce Mouat; Grant Hardie; Bobby Lammie; Hammy McMillan Jr. Kyle Waddell	Men's tournament	CHN; W 9–4	SWE; W 6–3	ITA; L 7–9	CZE; W 7–4	GER; W 9–4	SUI; L 5–6	NOR; L 6–7	CAN; L 5–9	USA; W 9–2	4 Q	SUI; W 8–5	CAN; L 6–9	2nd place, silver medalist(s)
Rebecca Morrison; Jennifer Dodds; Sophie Sinclair; Sophie Jackson; Fay Henderson	Women's tournament	CHN; L 4–7	KOR; L 3–9	CAN; W 7–6	SWE; L 7–10	DEN; W 7–2	SUI; L 6–10	USA; W 8–7	JPN; W 9–3	ITA; W 7–4	6	Did not advance		6
Jennifer Dodds; Bruce Mouat	Mixed doubles tournament	NOR; W 8–6	EST; W 10–5	CZE; W 8–7	SWE; W 7–4	KOR; W 8–2	CAN; W 7–5	USA; W 6–4	SUI; L 6–7	ITA; W 9–6	1 Q	SWE; L 3–9	ITA; L 3–5	4

=== Men's tournament ===
Great Britain qualified a men's team by finishing in the top seven based on the combined points at the 2024 and 2025 World Championships. Team Bruce Mouat was selected as the British representatives in June 2025.

Final Round Robin Standings
Team	Skip	Pld	W	L	W–L	PF	PA	EW	EL	BE	SE	S%	DSC	Qualification
Switzerland	Yannick Schwaller	9	9	0	–	75	40	42	30	3	8	88.7%	9.506	Playoffs
Canada	Brad Jacobs	9	7	2	–	63	45	40	28	8	13	86.5%	28.844	Playoffs
Norway	Magnus Ramsfjell	9	5	4	1–0	60	61	37	38	6	7	80.8%	26.938	Playoffs
Great Britain	Bruce Mouat	9	5	4	0–1	63	48	39	33	2	10	86.4%	16.613	Playoffs
United States	Daniel Casper	9	4	5	1–1	52	65	34	37	5	3	81.7%	17.663	
Italy	Joël Retornaz	9	4	5	1–1	58	67	33	39	6	7	83.0%	17.869	
Germany	Marc Muskatewitz	9	4	5	1–1	51	57	36	37	8	7	84.4%	24.850	
Czech Republic	Lukáš Klíma	9	3	6	–	54	63	35	41	3	5	79.8%	29.013	
Sweden	Niklas Edin	9	2	7	1–0	44	63	31	39	6	3	82.5%	26.000	
China	Xu Xiaoming	9	2	7	0–1	52	63	35	40	3	5	81.4%	34.875	

Source: Official website

Round robin
Great Britain had a bye in draws 4, 9 and 12.

Draw 1
Wednesday, 11 February, 19:05

Sheet D	1	2	3	4	5	6	7	8	9	10	Final
China (Xu)	0	1	0	1	0	1	0	1	0	X	4
Great Britain (Mouat) 🔨	1	0	3	0	1	0	3	0	1	X	9

Draw 2
Thursday, 12 February, 14:05

Sheet C	1	2	3	4	5	6	7	8	9	10	Final
Great Britain (Mouat) 🔨	2	0	0	1	1	0	2	0	X	X	6
Sweden (Edin)	0	0	1	0	0	1	0	1	X	X	3

Draw 3
Friday, 13 February, 9:05

Sheet B	1	2	3	4	5	6	7	8	9	10	Final
Great Britain (Mouat) 🔨	0	1	0	2	1	0	0	2	1	0	7
Italy (Retornaz)	4	0	1	0	0	0	2	0	0	2	9

Draw 5
Saturday, 14 February, 14:05

Sheet A	1	2	3	4	5	6	7	8	9	10	Final
Czech Republic (Klíma)	0	1	0	1	0	0	0	2	0	X	4
Great Britain (Mouat) 🔨	2	0	2	0	1	1	0	0	1	X	7

Draw 6
Sunday, 15 February, 9:05

Sheet B	1	2	3	4	5	6	7	8	9	10	Final
Germany (Muskatewitz)	0	0	2	0	0	0	0	2	0	X	4
Great Britain (Mouat) 🔨	2	0	0	2	1	0	2	0	2	X	9

Draw 7
Sunday, 15 February, 19:05

Sheet D	1	2	3	4	5	6	7	8	9	10	11	Final
Great Britain (Mouat)	0	1	1	0	1	0	0	1	0	1	0	5
Switzerland (Schwaller) 🔨	1	0	0	1	0	0	2	0	1	0	1	6

Draw 8
Monday, 16 February, 14:05

Sheet A	1	2	3	4	5	6	7	8	9	10	Final
Great Britain (Mouat) 🔨	0	0	0	2	0	2	0	0	2	0	6
Norway (Ramsfjell)	0	0	1	0	1	0	2	2	0	1	7

Draw 10
Tuesday, 17 February, 19:05

Sheet C	1	2	3	4	5	6	7	8	9	10	Final
Canada (Jacobs) 🔨	2	0	1	0	1	0	3	1	1	X	9
Great Britain (Mouat)	0	1	0	2	0	2	0	0	0	X	5

Draw 11
Wednesday, 18 February, 14:05

Sheet D	1	2	3	4	5	6	7	8	9	10	Final
United States (Casper) 🔨	0	0	0	0	2	0	X	X	X	X	2
Great Britain (Mouat)	1	1	4	0	0	3	X	X	X	X	9

Semifinal

Thursday, 19 February, 19:35

Sheet B	1	2	3	4	5	6	7	8	9	10	Final
Switzerland (Schwaller) 🔨	0	2	0	2	0	0	1	0	0	0	5
Great Britain (Mouat)	0	0	2	0	1	1	0	2	0	2	8

Gold medal game

Saturday, 21 February, 19:05

Sheet C	1	2	3	4	5	6	7	8	9	10	Final
Great Britain (Mouat)	0	2	0	1	0	2	0	1	0	0	6
Canada (Jacobs) 🔨	1	0	2	0	1	0	1	0	3	1	9

=== Women's tournament ===
Great Britain qualified a women's team by finishing in the top seven based on the combined points at the 2024 and 2025 World Championships. Team Sophie Jackson was selected as the British representatives in June 2025.

Final Round Robin Standings
Team	Skip	Pld	W	L	W–L	PF	PA	EW	EL	BE	SE	S%	DSC	Qualification
Sweden	Anna Hasselborg	9	7	2	–	65	50	45	32	5	14	81.7%	25.806	Playoffs
United States	Tabitha Peterson	9	6	3	2–0	60	54	40	37	3	13	82.1%	34.288	Playoffs
Switzerland	Silvana Tirinzoni	9	6	3	1–1	60	51	35	42	6	4	85.0%	44.338	Playoffs
Canada	Rachel Homan	9	6	3	0–2	76	59	45	38	2	9	80.3%	19.781	Playoffs
South Korea	Gim Eun-ji	9	5	4	1–0	60	53	37	35	8	11	81.2%	23.581	
Great Britain	Sophie Jackson	9	5	4	0–1	58	58	36	36	10	8	83.4%	16.938	
Denmark	Madeleine Dupont	9	4	5	–	49	58	36	38	3	11	77.0%	37.875	
Japan	Sayaka Yoshimura	9	2	7	1–1	51	69	35	43	3	6	78.6%	27.513	
Italy	Stefania Constantini	9	2	7	1–1	47	60	34	40	3	4	78.8%	34.719	
China	Wang Rui	9	2	7	1–1	56	70	37	39	3	9	82.7%	41.206	

Source: Official website

Round robin
Great Britain had a bye in draws 1, 5 and 9.

Draw 2
Thursday, 12 February, 19:05

Sheet A	1	2	3	4	5	6	7	8	9	10	Final
China (Wang)	0	0	0	2	0	0	2	2	0	1	7
Great Britain (Jackson) 🔨	0	0	2	0	0	1	0	0	1	0	4

Draw 3
Friday, 13 February, 14:05

Sheet D	1	2	3	4	5	6	7	8	9	10	Final
Great Britain (Jackson)	0	0	2	0	1	0	0	0	X	X	3
South Korea (Gim) 🔨	0	2	0	1	0	3	1	2	X	X	9

Draw 4
Saturday, 14 February, 9:05

Sheet B	1	2	3	4	5	6	7	8	9	10	Final
Great Britain (Jackson)	0	0	3	1	0	1	0	2	0	0	7
Canada (Homan) 🔨	1	0	0	0	1	0	1	0	1	2	6

Draw 6
Sunday, 15 February, 14:05

Sheet C	1	2	3	4	5	6	7	8	9	10	Final
Great Britain (Jackson) 🔨	2	0	1	0	0	0	2	0	2	0	7
Sweden (Hasselborg)	0	3	0	3	1	1	0	1	0	1	10

Draw 7
Monday, 16 February, 9:05

Sheet D	1	2	3	4	5	6	7	8	9	10	Final
Denmark (Dupont)	0	1	0	0	1	0	0	0	X	X	2
Great Britain (Jackson) 🔨	2	0	0	1	0	2	1	1	X	X	7

Draw 8
Monday, 16 February, 19:05

Sheet C	1	2	3	4	5	6	7	8	9	10	Final
Switzerland (Tirinzoni)	0	0	2	0	1	0	3	0	4	X	10
Great Britain (Jackson) 🔨	0	1	0	1	0	2	0	2	0	X	6

Draw 10
Wednesday, 18 February, 9:05

Sheet B	1	2	3	4	5	6	7	8	9	10	Final
United States (Peterson) 🔨	1	0	0	1	1	0	3	1	0	0	7
Great Britain (Jackson)	0	1	1	0	0	2	0	0	2	2	8

Draw 11
Wednesday, 18 February, 19:05

Sheet A	1	2	3	4	5	6	7	8	9	10	Final
Great Britain (Jackson) 🔨	0	3	1	0	2	0	2	1	X	X	9
Japan (Yoshimura)	0	0	0	1	0	2	0	0	X	X	3

Draw 12
Thursday, 19 February, 14:30

Sheet D	1	2	3	4	5	6	7	8	9	10	Final
Great Britain (Jackson) 🔨	0	1	0	2	1	0	0	0	3	0	7
Italy (Constantini)	0	0	1	0	0	2	0	0	0	1	4

=== Mixed doubles tournament ===
Great Britain qualified a mixed doubles team by finishing in the top seven based on the combined points at the 2024 and 2025 World Championships. Jennifer Dodds and Bruce Mouat were selected as the British representatives in June 2025.

Final Round Robin Standings
Team	Athletes	Pld	W	L	W–L	PF	PA	EW	EL	BE	SE	S%	DSC	Qualification
Great Britain	Jennifer Dodds / Bruce Mouat	9	8	1	–	69	46	37	30	0	11	79.6%	20.931	Playoffs
Italy	Stefania Constantini / Amos Mosaner	9	6	3	1–0	60	50	32	31	1	11	78.3%	27.931	Playoffs
United States	Cory Thiesse / Korey Dropkin	9	6	3	0–1	58	45	36	33	0	12	83.1%	25.900	Playoffs
Sweden	Isabella Wranå / Rasmus Wranå	9	5	4	–	62	55	31	34	0	9	80.1%	19.413	Playoffs
Canada	Jocelyn Peterman / Brett Gallant	9	4	5	2–0	58	52	35	31	0	10	78.5%	36.050	
Norway	Kristin Skaslien / Magnus Nedregotten	9	4	5	1–1	52	47	37	33	0	12	77.1%	24.444	
Switzerland	Briar Schwaller-Hürlimann / Yannick Schwaller	9	4	5	0–2	56	67	32	35	0	6	74.5%	24.000	
Czech Republic	Julie Zelingrová / Vít Chabičovský	9	3	6	1–0	45	62	30	34	0	6	69.1%	16.019	
South Korea	Kim Seon-yeong / Jeong Yeong-seok	9	3	6	0–1	47	64	32	34	0	9	75.1%	42.425	
Estonia	Marie Kaldvee / Harri Lill	9	2	7	–	46	65	32	39	0	7	71.6%	19.300	

Source: Official website

Round robin
Great Britain had a bye in draws 3, 9, 10, and 13.

Draw 1
Wednesday, 4 February, 19:05

Sheet B	1	2	3	4	5	6	7	8	Final
Great Britain (Dodds / Mouat) 🔨	0	3	0	1	0	3	0	1	8
Norway (Skaslien / Nedregotten)	1	0	2	0	1	0	2	0	6

Draw 2
Thursday, 5 February, 10:05

Sheet A	1	2	3	4	5	6	7	8	Final
Great Britain (Dodds / Mouat) 🔨	2	0	2	0	2	0	4	X	10
Estonia (Kaldvee / Lill)	0	2	0	1	0	2	0	X	5

Draw 4
Thursday, 5 February, 19:05

Sheet D	1	2	3	4	5	6	7	8	Final
Czech Republic (Zelingrová / Chabičovský)	1	0	1	0	3	0	0	2	7
Great Britain (Dodds / Mouat) 🔨	0	3	0	2	0	2	1	0	8

Draw 5
Friday, 6 February, 10:05

Sheet B	1	2	3	4	5	6	7	8	Final
Sweden (Wranå / Wranå)	0	0	2	1	0	1	0	X	4
Great Britain (Dodds / Mouat) 🔨	1	3	0	0	2	0	1	X	7

Draw 6
Friday, 6 February, 14:35

Sheet C	1	2	3	4	5	6	7	8	Final
South Korea (Kim / Jeong) 🔨	0	0	1	0	0	0	1	X	2
Great Britain (Dodds / Mouat)	2	1	0	2	2	1	0	X	8

Draw 7
Saturday, 7 February, 10:05

Sheet C	1	2	3	4	5	6	7	8	Final
Great Britain (Dodds / Mouat) 🔨	3	0	2	0	2	0	0	X	7
Canada (Peterman / Gallant)	0	1	0	1	0	1	2	X	5

Draw 8
Saturday, 7 February, 14:35

Sheet D	1	2	3	4	5	6	7	8	Final
Great Britain (Dodds / Mouat) 🔨	2	1	0	1	0	1	1	X	6
United States (Thiesse / Dropkin)	0	0	1	0	3	0	0	X	4

Draw 11
Sunday, 8 February, 14:35

Sheet B	1	2	3	4	5	6	7	8	Final
Great Britain (Dodds / Mouat)	0	0	0	2	2	0	2	0	6
Switzerland (Schwaller-Hürlimann / Schwaller) 🔨	1	2	1	0	0	1	0	2	7

Draw 12
Sunday, 8 February, 19:05

Sheet A	1	2	3	4	5	6	7	8	Final
Italy (Constantini / Mosaner) 🔨	2	0	1	0	0	3	0	0	6
Great Britain (Dodds / Mouat)	0	3	0	1	1	0	3	1	9

Semifinal

Monday, 9 February, 18:05

Sheet B	1	2	3	4	5	6	7	8	Final
Great Britain (Dodds / Mouat) 🔨	1	0	0	1	1	0	0	X	3
Sweden (Wranå / Wranå)	0	2	1	0	0	5	1	X	9

Bronze medal game

Tuesday, 10 February, 14:05

Sheet C	1	2	3	4	5	6	7	8	Final
Great Britain (Dodds / Mouat) 🔨	0	1	0	0	1	0	1	0	3
Italy (Constantini / Mosaner)	1	0	1	1	0	1	0	1	5

== Figure skating ==
In the 2025 World Figure Skating Championships in Boston, the United States, Great Britain secured one quota in each of the women's singles and pairs skating, and two quotas in the ice dancing. The team was officially announced on 10 December 2025 with Edward Appleby being named as the representative in the Men's event in the Team event.

Athlete	Event	SP/SD		FP/FD		Total	
Athlete	Event	Points	Rank	Points	Rank	Points	Rank
Kristen Spours	Women's singles	45.54	29	Did not advance			
Anastasia Vaipan-Law; Luke Digby	Pairs	66.07	13 Q	112.99	16	179.06	15
Lilah Fear; Lewis Gibson	Ice dance	85.47	4 Q	118.85	12	204.32	7
Phebe Bekker; James Hernandez	Ice dance	72.46	16 Q	106.99	18	179.45	17

Team event

Athlete	Event	Short program / Rhythm dance						Free skate / Free dance				Total	
Athlete	Event	Men's	Women's	Pairs	Ice dance	Total		Men's	Women's	Pairs	Ice dance	Total	
Athlete	Event	Points Team points	Points Team points	Points Team points	Points Team points	Points	Rank	Points Team points	Points Team points	Points Team points	Points Team points	Points	Rank
Edward Appleby (M); Kristen Spours (W); Anastasia Vaipan-Law / Luke Digby (P); Lilah Fear / Lewis Gibson (ID)	Team event	69.68; 1	48.28; 1	57.29; 2	86.85; 8	12	9	Did not advance					

== Freestyle skiing ==
On 20 January 2026, Team GB confirmed its acceptance of eight athletes quotas in freestyle skiing

Freeski

Athlete	Event	Qualification					Final				
Athlete	Event	Run 1	Run 2	Run 3	Best	Rank	Run 1	Run 2	Run 3	Best	Rank
Gus Kenworthy	Men's halfpipe	81.25	DNI	—N/a	81.25	9 Q	6.00	84.75	DNI	84.75	6
Liam Richards	Men's halfpipe	54.50	61.00	—N/a	61.00	17	Did not advance				
Chris McCormick	Men's big air	31.25	70.00	57.75	127.75	22	Did not advance				
Chris McCormick	Men's slopestyle	33.90	33.21	—	33.90	26	Did not advance				
Zoe Atkin	Women's halfpipe	91.50	DNI	—N/a	91.50	1 Q	90.50	DNI	92.50	92.50	3rd place, bronze medalist(s)
Kirsty Muir	Women's big air	87.50	79.00	DNI	166.50	4 Q	81.75	93.00	DNI	174.75	4
Kirsty Muir	Women's slopestyle	63.18	64.98	—	64.98	3 Q	37.15	63.01	76.05	76.05	4

Moguls

Athlete	Event	Qualification								Final							
Athlete	Event	Run 1				Run 2				Run 1				Run 2			Rank
Athlete	Event	Time	Points	Total	Rank	Time	Points	Total	Rank	Time	Points	Total	Rank	Time	Points	Total	Rank
Mateo Jeannesson	Men's moguls	26.86	32.79	44.64	28	23.67	40.32	56.46	18	Did not advance							
Makayla Gerken Schofield	Women's moguls	28.67	52.09	66.38	18	28.28	50.39	66.17	11	Did not advance							

Dual moguls

Athlete	Event	Seeding		Knockout rounds					Final rank
Athlete	Event	Time	Rank	Round of 32	Round of 16	Quarter-final	Semi-final	Final	Final rank
Athlete	Event	Time	Rank	Opponent Score	Opponent Score	Opponent Score	Opponent Score	Opponent Score	Final rank
Makayla Gerken Schofield	Women's dual moguls	-	24	Avital Carroll (AUT); L12 – 23	Did not advance				22

Ski cross

Athlete	Event	Seeding		Round of 16	Quarterfinal	Semifinal	Final	
Athlete	Event	Time	Rank	Position	Position	Position	Position	Rank
Oliver Davies	Men's ski cross	1:09.33	28	4	Did not advance			

Qualification legend: FA – Qualify to medal round; FB – Qualify to consolation round

== Short-track speed skating ==
Great Britain qualified three short-track speed skater quota places (two men and one woman) after the conclusion of the 2025–26 ISU Short Track World Tour. However, only Niall Treacy was selected when the team announcement was made on 18 December 2025.

Men

Athlete	Event	Heat		Quarterfinal		Semifinal		Final	
Athlete	Event	Time	Rank	Time	Rank	Time	Rank	Time	Rank
Niall Treacy	500 m	56.712	4	Did not advance					
Niall Treacy	1000 m	1:54.040	4	Did not advance					
Niall Treacy	1500 m	—N/a		2:17.365	2 Q	2:16.816	1 Q	PEN	9

== Skeleton ==
Following the conclusion of the qualification period in Skeleton, Great Britain had qualified 2 sleds in the men's and 3 sleds in the women's disciplines. In addition, Great Britain has qualified two teams in the new mixed team event, in which both Weston and Wyatt are guaranteed a place, while selection of the female riders will take place after the completion of the women's individual competition.

Athlete	Event	Run 1		Run 2		Run 3		Run 4		Total	
Athlete	Event	Time	Rank	Time	Rank	Time	Rank	Time	Rank	Time	Rank
Matt Weston	Men's	56.21 TR	1	55.88 TR	1	55.63 TR	1	55.61 TR	1	3:43:33	1st place, gold medalist(s)
Marcus Wyatt	Men's	56.52	7	56.69	12	56.32	10	56.24	9	3:45:77	9
Amelia Coltman	Women's	57.86	10	57.73	9	58.13	14	57.60	4	3:51.32	9
Freya Tarbit	Women's	57.76	8	57.40	4	57.87	9	57.77	7	3:50.80	7
Tabitha Stoecker	Women's	57.40	3	57.61	7	57.75	6	57.72	5	3:50.48	5
Matt Weston; Tabitha Stoecker	Mixed team	1:00.77 (Stoecker)	4	58.59 (Weston)	1	—				1:59.36 TR	1st place, gold medalist(s)
Marcus Wyatt; Freya Tarbit	Mixed team	1:00.47 (Tarbit)	1	59.18 (Wyatt)	6	—				1:59.65	4

== Snowboarding ==
On 20 January 2026, Team GB confirmed its acceptance of five athletes quotas in snowboarding.

Freestyle

Athlete	Event	Qualification					Final				
Athlete	Event	Run 1	Run 2	Run 3	Total	Rank	Run 1	Run 2	Run 3	Total	Rank
Mia Brookes	Women's big air	29.75	89.00	78.00	167.00	3 Q	80.75	78.75	DNI	159.50	4
Mia Brookes	Women's slopestyle	38.11	56.53	—	56.53	16	Did not advance				16
Maisie Hill	Women's big air	20.00	DNI	57.25	77.25	29	Did not advance				
Maisie Hill	Women's slopestyle	24.21	48.66	—	48.66	21	Did not advance				21
Txema Mazet Brown	Men's big air	67.50	84.25	DNI	151.75	21	Did not advance				
Txema Mazet Brown	Men's slopestyle	22.26	23.01	—N/a	23.01	27	Did not advance				

Snowboard cross

Athlete	Event	Seeding		1/8 final	Quarterfinal	Semifinal	Final	
Athlete	Event	Time	Rank	Position	Position	Position	Position	Rank
Huw Nightingale	Men's snowboard cross	1:08.75	10	4	Did not advance			
Charlotte Bankes	Women's snowboard cross	1:14.31	9	1	4	Did not advance		
Huw Nightingale; Charlotte Bankes	Mixed team snowboard cross	N/A			1Q	1Q	1	1st place, gold medalist(s)

Qualification legend: Q - Qualify to next round; FA - Qualify to medal final; FB - Qualify to consolation final

== Speed skating ==
Great Britain qualified one spot in the women's 1000m and 1500m through performances at the 2025-26 ISU Speed Skating World Cup. On 8 January 2026, Ellia Smeding was confirmed for both spots, marking her second Olympic appearance after she made her Olympic debut in 2022.

Athlete	Event	Race	
Athlete	Event	Time	Rank
Ellia Smeding	Women's 500 m	38.93	25
Ellia Smeding	Women's 1000 m	1:15.834	11
Ellia Smeding	Women's 1500m	1:58.40	23

== See also ==
- Great Britain at the 2026 Winter Paralympics
