= Bolivia at the 2026 Winter Olympics =

- Flag of Bolivia
- IOC code: BOL
- NOC: Bolivian Olympic Committee
- Website: www.comiteolimpicoboliviano.org.bo (in Spanish)

in Milan and Cortina d'Ampezzo, Italy 6 February 2026 – 22 February 2026
- Competitors: 1 (1 man) in 1 sport
- Flag bearer (opening): Timo Juhani Grönlund
- Flag bearer (closing): Timo Juhani Grönlund
- Medals: Gold 0 Silver 0 Bronze 0 Total 0

Winter Olympics appearances (overview)
- 1956; 1960–1976; 1980; 1984; 1988; 1992; 1994–2014; 2018; 2022; 2026

Bolivia competed at the 2026 Winter Olympics in Milan and Cortina d'Ampezzo, Italy, from 6 to 22 February 2026.

Cross-country skier Timo Juhani Grönlund was the country's flagbearer during the opening ceremony. Grönlund was also the country's flagbearer during the closing ceremony.

== Competitors ==
The following is the list of number of competitors participating at the Games per sport/discipline.

Sport	Men	Women	Total
Cross-country skiing	1	0	1
Total	1	0	1

== Cross-country skiing ==
Bolivia qualified one male cross-country skier through the basic quota. Finnish-Bolivian Timo Juhani Grönlund is expected to compete in his third Olympics.

Distance

Athlete	Event	Classical		Freestyle		Total	
Athlete	Event	Time	Rank	Time	Rank	Time	Rank
Timo Juhani Grönlund	Men's 20 km skiathlon	29:42.3	74	LAP			73
Timo Juhani Grönlund	Men's 10 km freestyle	—N/a		25:15.5	82	—N/a	
Timo Juhani Grönlund	Men's 50 km classical	LAP	50	—N/a			

Sprint

Athlete	Event	Qualification		Quarterfinal		Semifinal		Final	
Athlete	Event	Time	Rank	Time	Rank	Time	Rank	Time	Rank
Timo Juhani Grönlund	Men's sprint	4:06.04	93	Did not advance					
