= Bolivia at the 1984 Winter Olympics =

- IOC code: BOL
- NOC: Bolivian Olympic Committee
- Website: www.cobol.org.bo (in Spanish)

in Sarajevo
- Competitors: 3 (men) in 1 sport
- Medals: Gold 0 Silver 0 Bronze 0 Total 0

Winter Olympics appearances (overview)
- 1956; 1960–1976; 1980; 1984; 1988; 1992; 1994–2014; 2018; 2022; 2026; 2030

Bolivia competed at the 1984 Winter Olympics in Sarajevo, Yugoslavia.

== Alpine skiing ==
Men

Athlete	Event	Race 1		Race 2		Total	
Athlete	Event	Time	Rank	Time	Rank	Time	Rank
Scott Sánchez	Downhill					1:54.75	43
Mario Hada	Giant Slalom	DSQ	–	–	–	DSQ	–
José-Manuel Bejarano	Giant Slalom	2:04.38	81	2:29.58	76	4:33.96	76
Scott Sánchez	Giant Slalom	1:29.45	38	1:27.84	32	2:57.29	34
Scott Sánchez	Slalom	1:00.16	36	DNF	–	DNF	–
