= Joni Mäki =

Finnish cross-country skier (born 1995)

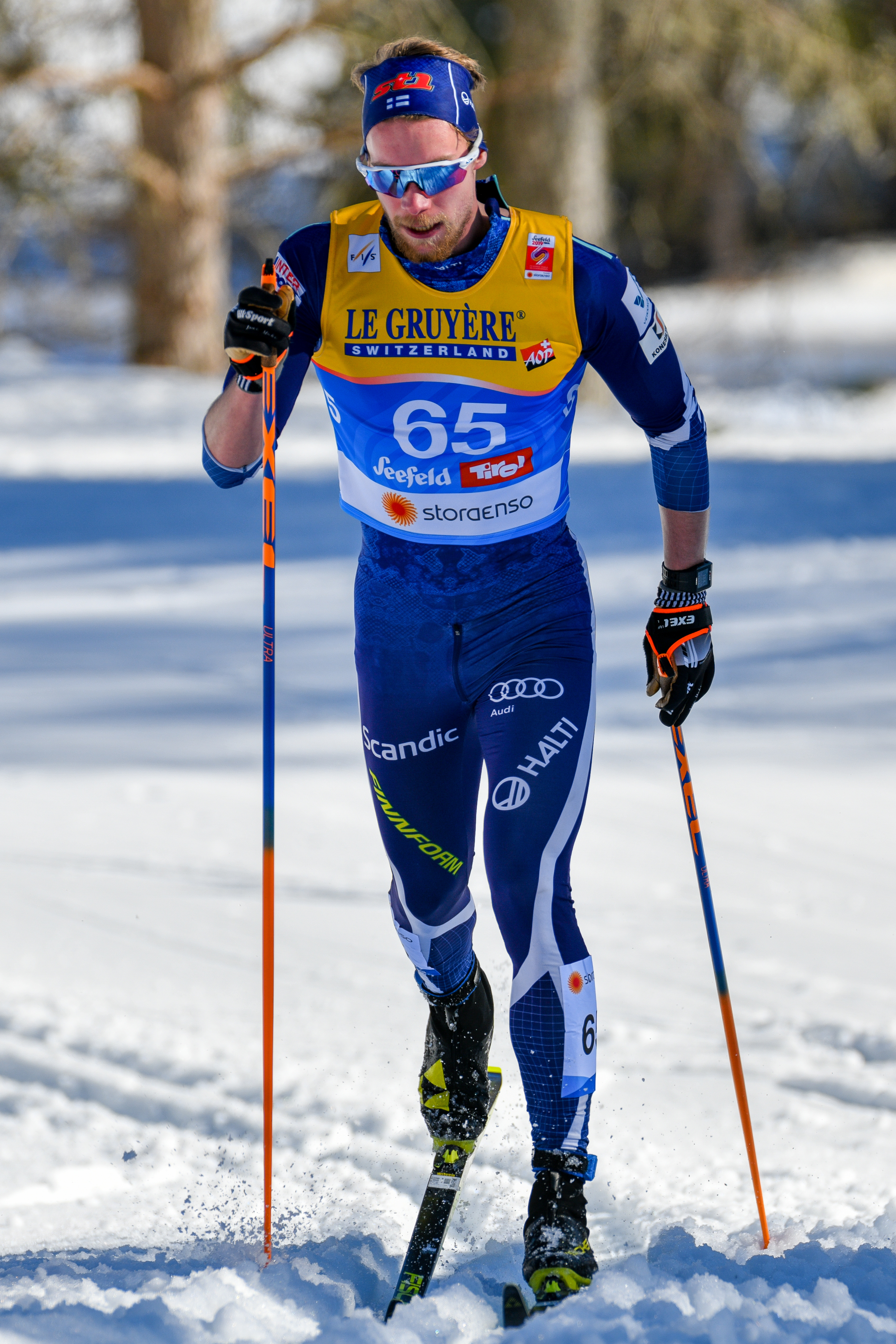
- Mäki in 2019

Personal information
- Nationality: Finland
- Born: 24 January 1995 (age 31) Vaasa, Finland

Sport
- Sport: Skiing
- Club: Pohti Skiteam

World Cup career
- Seasons: 8 – (2016–present)
- Indiv. starts: 58
- Indiv. podiums: 1
- Team starts: 10
- Team podiums: 2
- Team wins: 0
- Overall titles: 0 – (31st in 2022)
- Discipline titles: 0
Medal record
Men's cross-country skiing
Representing Finland
Olympic Games
Silver medal – second place	2022 Beijing	Team sprint
World Championships
Silver medal – second place	2021 Oberstdorf	Team sprint
Junior World Championships
Bronze medal – third place	2014 Val di Fiemme	Individual sprint
- Updated on 28 March 2023

Joni Mäki (born 24 January 1995) is a Finnish cross-country skier. He is a silver medalist in the team sprint at both the 2022 Winter Olympics and the 2021 World Championships.

== Career ==
As a junior, Mäki won bronze in the sprint event at the 2014 U20 World Championships in Val di Fiemme. He made his World Cup debut in 2014 and placed in the top thirty for the first time in January 2016. So far, he has three podiums in the World Cup, one from team sprint (Planica 2020) and one from relay (Lahti 2021), and his best individual result is a 2nd place at the classical sprint in the 2021–22 season finale in Falun.

In 2019, at his first World Championships in Seefeld, Mäki placed 13th in the freestyle sprint event, being the first athlete not to qualify into the semi-finals. In the 2021 World Championships in Oberstdorf, he again placed thirteenth in the individual sprint, held this time in the classic style. Only three days later, though, Mäki won his first World Championships medal when he and teammate Ristomatti Hakola placed second at the team sprint event. Mäki secured them the silver medal with a solid last leg, where he lost to Norwegian Johannes Høsflot Klæbo but overtook the Russian Gleb Retivykh, who had had a head start in the beginning of the last leg. In the 4 x 10 kilometre relay, he placed sixth along with teammates Hakola, Iivo Niskanen and Perttu Hyvärinen, with whom he'd reached the podium in Lahti earlier in the season.

Mäki started his 2021–22 season well, succeeding in domestic competitions. He followed this by reaching his first World Cup sprint final in the classical sprint event in Ruka, where he finished sixth. In the weeks after, though, he began suffering from health problems and missed the Tour de Ski, among other World Cup events. Mäki was again in good form in the Beijing Olympics, reaching the final in the freestyle sprint. Mäki, who has never reached a freestyle sprint final in World Cup competitions, placed fourth, only a second short of the bronze medal. In the classical team sprint, Mäki won his first Olympic medal when he and the 15-kilometre Olympic champion Iivo Niskanen took the silver medal. In the final sprint of the World Cup season at Falun, Mäki reached his first individual WC podium when he placed second after Sprint World Cup winner Richard Jouve.

Mäki has recently won several medals in Finnish National Championships and represents Pohti Ski Team in national competitions. He won the 2020–21 Suomen Cup, Finland's highest-level domestic cross-country competition tournament.

== Cross-country skiing results ==
All results are sourced from the International Ski Federation (FIS).

=== Olympic Games ===
- 1 medal (1 silver)

Year	Age	10/15 km individual	20/30 km skiathlon	50 km mass start	Sprint	4 × 7.5/10 km relay	Team sprint
2022	27	—	—	—^{[a]}	4	6	Silver
2026	31	48	—	—	16	—	11

^{a} Distance reduced to 30 km due to weather conditions.

=== World Championships ===
- 1 medal – (1 silver)

Year	Age	15 km individual	30 km skiathlon	50 km mass start	Sprint	4 × 10 km relay	Team sprint
2019	24	52	—	—	13	—	—
2021	26	DNF	—	—	13	6	Silver
2023	28	—	—	—	19	—	11

=== World Cup ===
==== Season standings ====
Season	Age	Discipline standings				Ski Tour standings				
Season	Age	Overall	Distance	Sprint	U23	Nordic Opening	Tour de Ski	Ski Tour 2020	World Cup Final	Ski Tour Canada
2014	19	NC	NC	NC	—N/a	—	—	—N/a	—	—N/a
2015	20	NC	—	NC	NC	—	—	—N/a	—N/a	—N/a
2016	21	148	—	99	19	—	—	—N/a	—N/a	—
2017	22	NC	NC	NC	NC	—	—	—N/a	—	—N/a
2018	23	130	—	72	20	DNF	—	—N/a	54	—N/a
2019	24	44	79	19	—N/a	DNF	—	—N/a	36	—N/a
2020	25	76	NC	39	—N/a	37	—	—	—N/a	—N/a
2021	26	37	42	28	—N/a	12	—	—N/a	—N/a	—N/a
2022	27	31	83	10	—N/a	—N/a	—	—N/a	—N/a	—N/a
2023	28	45	101	21	—N/a	—N/a	—	—N/a	—N/a	—N/a
2024	29	33	72	11	—N/a	—N/a	DNF	—N/a	—N/a	—N/a

==== Individual podiums ====
- 1 podium – (1 WC, 0 SWC)

No.	Season	Date	Location	Race	Level	Place
1	2021–22	11 March 2022	Falun, Sweden	1.4 km Sprint C	World Cup	2nd

==== Team podiums ====
- 2 podiums – (1 RL, 1 TS)

No.	Season	Date	Location	Race	Level	Place	Teammate(s)
1	2019–20	22 December 2019	Planica, Slovenia	6 × 1.2 km Team Sprint F	World Cup	3rd	Hakola
2	2020–21	24 January 2021	Lahti, Finland	4 × 7.5 km Relay C/F	World Cup	2nd	Hyvärinen / Hakola / Niskanen
