= Biathlon at the 2026 Winter Olympics – Qualification =

The following is about the qualification rules and the quota allocation for the biathlon at the 2026 Winter Olympics.

== Quota allocation ==
A total quota of 210 athletes are allowed at the Games (105 both men and women). The first 93 quota allocations, per gender, will be assigned from the 2024/25 World Cup Nation Cup score. The final 12 spots, per gender, will be allocated using the IBU Qualifying Points List (as of 18 January 2026), to nations who have not qualified any athletes yet, with a maximum of two per nation.

From the 2024/25 world cup final standings, NOCs ranked 1-3 will qualify six athletes, 4-10 five athletes, and 11-20 four athletes, for both male and female competitions. The final twelve spots in each gender are filled individually from the IBU Qualifying points list to a maximum of two for a nation, from nations not already qualified. Two of these spots will be used by the host if not already qualified. The host may only start in the relay competitions that they have enough qualified athletes for. Reallocation of unused quotas will be from the IBU Qualifying points list for nations that have not yet qualified, or only have one qualifier. For each event a maximum of 4 athletes per NOC may compete, except the Mass Start in which it remains possible to qualify up to 6.

=== Minimum Requirements ===
During the 2024/25 or 2025/26 Biathlon World Cup season the athlete must have two results at IBU Cup, Open European Championships, World Championships or World Cup in the Sprint or Individual and have at most an IBU Qualifying point total of 150 or less. Or, two placings in the top half at the Junior World Championships. They also can have a combination of both criteria (one of each). All relay members must meet this requirement as well.

== Qualification summary ==
The NOC rankings are complete, so quotas achieved by this method are assured. The final twelve quotas (per gender), achieved through IBU qualifying points, can continue to change up to the 18 January 2026 deadline.

| Nations | Men's Quotas | Women's Quotas | Men's Provisional | Women's Provisional | Total |
|---|---|---|---|---|---|
| Australia | | | | 1 | 1 |
| Austria | 4 | 5 | | | 9 |
| Belgium | 4 | 4 | | | 8 |
| Bulgaria | 4 | 4 | | | 8 |
| Canada | 4 | 4 | | | 8 |
| China | | | 1 | 2 | 3 |
| Croatia | | | 2 | 1 | 3 |
| Czech Republic | 5 | 5 | | | 10 |
| Denmark | | | 1 | 2 | 3 |
| Estonia | 4 | 4 | | | 8 |
| Finland | 5 | 5 | | | 10 |
| France | 6 | 6 | | | 12 |
| Germany | 5 | 6 | | | 11 |
| Great Britain | | | 1 | 1 | 2 |
| Italy | 5 | 5 | | | 10 |
| Kazakhstan | | | 2 | 2 | 4 |
| Latvia | 4 | 4 | | | 8 |
| Lithuania | 4 | 4 | | | 8 |
| Moldova | | | 2 | 1 | 3 |
| Norway | 6 | 5 | | | 11 |
| Poland | 4 | 4 | | | 8 |
| Romania | 4 | | | 1 | 5 |
| Slovakia | | 4 | 2 | | 6 |
| Slovenia | 5 | 4 | | | 9 |
| South Korea | | | 1 | 1 | 2 |
| Sweden | 6 | 6 | | | 12 |
| Switzerland | 5 | 5 | | | 10 |
| Ukraine | 5 | 5 | | | 10 |
| United States | 4 | 4 | | | 8 |
| Total: 29 NOCs | 93 | 93 | 12 | 12 | 210 |

== Qualification standings ==
| Qualifies 6 athletes |
| Qualifies 5 athletes |
| Qualifies 4 athletes |
| Qualifies 2 athletes by IBU qualifying points |
| Qualifies 1 athlete by IBU qualifying points |

Standings after 26 of 26 events.

Men's standings
| Position | Country | Nations Cup Points |
|---|---|---|
| 1 | France | 9002 |
| 2 | Norway | 8842 |
| 3 | Sweden | 7862 |
| 4 | Germany | 7689 |
| 5 | Italy | 6776 |
| 6 | Switzerland | 6737 |
| 7 | Czech Republic | 6493 |
| 8 | Ukraine | 6382 |
| 9 | Slovenia | 6320 |
| 10 | Finland | 6095 |
| 11 | Austria | 6085 |
| 12 | United States | 5530 |
| 13 | Belgium | 4666 |
| 14 | Poland | 4479 |
| 15 | Bulgaria | 4360 |
| 16 | Estonia | 4347 |
| 17 | Romania | 4283 |
| 18 | Latvia | 4176 |
| 19 | Lithuania | 4099 |
| 20 | Canada | 3560 |
| 21 | Kazakhstan | 3406 |
| 22 | Moldova | 2885 |
| 23 | Slovakia | 2485 |
| 24 | Croatia | 723 |
| 25 | China | 689 |
| 26 | South Korea | 667 |
| 27 | Greece | 313 |
| 28 | Great Britain | 300 |
| 29 | Japan | 300 |
| 30 | Denmark (Note: Athletes from Greenland qualify for Denmark.) | 264 (Note: Nation's cup points are only displayed for Denmark because they are the highest ranked National Federation of Denmark's National Olympic Committee.) |
| 31 | Australia | 197 |
| 32 | Spain | 65 |
| 33 | Argentina | 60 |
| 34 | Mongolia | 13 |

Standings after 26 of 26 events.

Women's standings
| Position | Country | Nations Cup Points |
|---|---|---|
| 1 | France | 9060 |
| 2 | Sweden | 8146 |
| 3 | Germany | 8051 |
| 4 | Norway | 7967 |
| 5 | Switzerland | 7066 |
| 6 | Italy | 6758 |
| 7 | Austria | 6522 |
| 8 | Ukraine | 6124 |
| 9 | Czech Republic | 6018 |
| 10 | Finland | 5782 |
| 11 | Poland | 5733 |
| 12 | Slovenia | 5045 |
| 13 | Estonia | 5072 |
| 14 | Slovakia | 4850 |
| 15 | Bulgaria | 4820 |
| 16 | Canada | 4784 |
| 17 | Belgium | 4532 |
| 18 | Latvia | 4420 |
| 19 | United States | 4088 |
| 20 | Lithuania | 3501 |
| 21 | Romania | 2846 |
| 22 | Kazakhstan | 2663 |
| 23 | Moldova | 2489 |
| 24 | China | 928 |
| 25 | South Korea | 707 |
| 26 | Australia | 572 |
| 27 | Croatia | 452 |
| 28 | Great Britain | 384 |
| 29 | Denmark | 233 |
| 30 | Greece | 186 |
| 31 | Brazil | 159 |
| 32 | Japan | 149 |
| 33 | Hungary | 104 |

=== IBU Qualifying points ===
As of 17 January 2026.

Men's standings
| Position | Athlete | Points |
|---|---|---|
| 1 | (Moldova) Maksim Makarov | 51.31 |
| 2 | (Denmark) Sondre Slettemark | 59.02 |
| 3 | (United Kingdom) Jacques Jefferies | 61.33 |
| 4 | (Moldova) Pavel Magazeev | 62.09 |
| 5 | (Kazakhstan) Vladislav Kireyev | 63.26 |
| 6 | (Croatia) Krešimir Crnković | 64.10 |
| 7 | (Croatia) Matija Legović | 64.82 |
| 8 | (Kazakhstan) Asset Dyussenov | 66.23 |
| 9 | (China) Yan Xingyuan | 68.43 |
| 10 | (Slovakia) Tomáš Sklenárik | 69.95 |
| 11 | (Slovakia) Šimon Adamov | 70.32 |
| 12 | (South Korea) Timofei Lapshin | 74.13 |
| 13 | (China) Gu Cang | 78.49 |
| 14 | (Japan) Mikito Tachizaki | 79.04 |
| 15 | (Japan) Masaharu Yamamoto | 93.04 |
| 16 | (Australia) Noah Bradford | 111.26 |
| 17 | (South Korea) Choi Du-jin | 112.43 |
| 18 | (Australia) Phoenix Sparke | 120.16 |
| 19 | (Denmark) Rasmus Schiellerup | 125.21 |
| 20 | (Mongolia) Enkhsaikhan Enkhbat | 126.26 |

Women's standings
| Position | Athlete | Points |
|---|---|---|
| 1 | (Moldova) Alina Stremous | 37.70 |
| 2 | (China) Chu Yuanmeng | 50.75 |
| 3 | (Denmark) Anne de Besche | 55.13 |
| 4 | (Croatia) Anika Kožica | 67.89 |
| 5 | (Denmark) Ukaleq Slettemark | 70.97 |
| 6 | (Romania) Anastasia Tolmacheva | 73.31 |
| 7 | (China) Meng Fanqi | 74.11 |
| 8 | (South Korea) Ekaterina Avvakumova | 84.83 |
| 9 | (Kazakhstan) Aisha Rakisheva | 95.10 |
| 10 | (Kazakhstan) Olga Poltoranina | 95.74 |
| 11 | (United Kingdom) Shawna Pendry | 95.81 |
| 12 | (Australia) Darcie Morton | 99.22 |
| 13 | (Romania) Andreea Mezdrea | 99.97 |
| 14 | (International Olympic Committee) (Note: Refugee athlete from Belarus living in Poland.) Darya Dolidovich | 103.15 |
| 15 | (Brazil) Gaia Brunello | 110.99 |
| 16 | (Moldova) Aliona Makarova | 111.65 |
| 17 | (Greece) Konstantina Charalampidou | 115.15 |
| 18 | (Croatia) Iva Morić | 122.23 |
| 19 | (South Korea) Mariya Abe | 132.06 |
| 20 | (Japan) Mikoto Takeuchi | 136.56 |
