= Cross-country skiing at the 2026 Winter Olympics – Men's sprint =

Men's sprint at the XXV Olympic Winter Games
- Cross-country skiing
- Venue: Cross country and biathlon center Fabio Canal, Tesero
- Date: 10 February 2026
- Competitors: 95 from 50 nations
- Winning time: 3:39.74

Medalists
1st place, gold medalist(s)		Johannes Høsflot Klæbo	Norway
2nd place, silver medalist(s)		Ben Ogden	United States
3rd place, bronze medalist(s)		Oskar Opstad Vike	Norway

The men's sprint competition in cross-country skiing at the 2026 Winter Olympics was held on 10 February, over a 1.585-kilometre (0.985 mi) course at the Cross country and biathlon center Fabio Canal in Tesero. Johannes Høsflot Klæbo of Norway, the 2018 and 2022 champion, won the event and his seventh gold medal. Ben Ogden of the United States won silver, and Oskar Opstad Vike won bronze. Both became the first-time medalists. Ogden became the first American male cross-country skier to win a medal since Bill Koch in 1976.

== Background ==
The 2022 champion, Johannes Høsflot Klæbo, qualified for the Olympics, as did the silver medalist, Federico Pellegrino. The bronze medalist, Alexander Terentyev, was barred from participation because skiers from Russia could only participate as individual neutral athletes, and he did not obtain this status. Klæbo was leading both overall and sprint standings of the 2025–26 FIS Cross-Country World Cup before the Olympics. He was the 2025 world champion in sprint as well.

== Results ==
=== Qualifying ===
The qualifying was held at 09:55. The fastest thirty athletes qualified (Q) for the finals.

Rank	Bib	Athlete	Country	Time	Deficit	Note
1	24	Johannes Høsflot Klæbo	Norway	3:07.37		Q
2	8	Ben Ogden	United States	3:09.88	+2.51	Q
3	18	Jules Chappaz	France	3:12.86	+5.49	Q
4	13	Jiří Tuž	Czech Republic	3:13.48	+6.11	Q
5	2	Harald Østberg Amundsen	Norway	3:14.12	+6.75	Q
6	15	Noe Näff	Switzerland	3:14.23	+6.86	Q
7	11	Alvar Myhlback	Sweden	3:14.53	+7.16	Q
8	22	Valerio Grond	Switzerland	3:14.81	+7.44	Q
9	14	Emil Liekari	Finland	3:15.01	+7.64	Q
10	29	Lucas Chanavat	France	3:15.29	+7.92	Q
11	23	Jan Stölben	Germany	3:15.76	+8.39	Q
12	4	Janik Riebli	Switzerland	3:15.81	+8.44	Q
13	19	Jaume Pueyo	Spain	3:15.81	+8.44	Q
14	27	Ondřej Černý	Czech Republic	3:15.93	+8.56	Q
15	30	Federico Pellegrino	Italy	3:16.11	+8.74	Q
16	10	Joni Mäki	Finland	3:16.15	+8.78	Q
17	12	Simone Mocellini	Italy	3:16.24	+8.87	Q
18	3	Richard Jouve	France	3:16.44	+9.07	Q
19	28	Edvin Anger	Sweden	3:17.31	+9.94	Q
20	16	Oskar Opstad Vike	Norway	3:17.41	+10.04	Q
21	26	Erik Valnes	Norway	3:17.44	+10.07	Q
22	40	Théo Schely	France	3:17.84	+10.47	Q
23	9	Zak Ketterson	United States	3:18.14	+10.77	Q
24	52	Simone Daprà	Italy	3:18.14	+10.77	Q
25	20	Anton Grahn	Sweden	3:18.21	+10.84	Q
26	32	Elia Barp	Italy	3:18.27	+10.90	Q
27	6	Lauri Vuorinen	Finland	3:18.28	+10.91	Q
28	21	JC Schoonmaker	United States	3:18.38	+11.01	Q
29	48	Bernat Sellés	Spain	3:18.56	+11.19	Q
30	5	Johan Häggström	Sweden	3:18.73	+11.36	Q
31	17	Gus Schumacher	United States	3:18.87	+11.50	
31	31	Miha Šimenc	Slovenia	3:18.87	+11.50	
33	7	Benjamin Moser	Austria	3:19.04	+11.67	
34	25	Niilo Moilanen	Finland	3:19.69	+12.32	
35	38	Savelii Korostelev	Individual Neutral Athletes	3:19.88	+12.51	
36	51	Janosch Brugger	Germany	3:20.45	+13.08	
37	37	Wang Qiang	China	3:21.49	+14.12	
38	34	Michal Novák	Czech Republic	3:21.66	+14.29	
39	46	Antoine Cyr	Canada	3:21.96	+14.59	
40	36	Maciej Staręga	Poland	3:22.28	+14.91	
41	39	Xavier McKeever	Canada	3:22.46	+15.09	
42	56	Hugo Hinckfuss	Australia	3:23.41	+16.04	
43	42	Vili Črv	Slovenia	3:23.44	+16.07	
44	45	Martin Himma	Estonia	3:23.64	+16.27	
45	1	James Clugnet	Great Britain	3:23.66	+16.29	
46	35	Michael Föttinger	Austria	3:23.92	+16.55	
47	54	Thomas Stephen	Canada	3:24.02	+16.65	
48	57	Manex Silva	Brazil	3:25.48	+18.11	
49	49	Peter Hinds	Slovakia	3:25.78	+18.41	
50	33	Nejc Štern	Slovenia	3:26.12	+18.75	
51	43	Lars Young Vik	Australia	3:26.13	+18.76	
52	47	Raimo Vīgants	Latvia	3:26.26	+18.89	
53	53	Sebastian Bryja	Poland	3:26.83	+19.46	
54	74	Aleksandar Grbović	Montenegro	3:27.09	+19.72	
55	41	Marc Colell	Spain	3:27.49	+20.12	
56	55	Rémi Drolet	Canada	3:27.72	+20.35	
57	50	Lauris Kaparkalējs	Latvia	3:28.33	+20.96	
58	81	Tomáš Cenek	Slovakia	3:28.34	+20.97	
59	44	Karl Sebastian Dremljuga	Estonia	3:29.60	+22.23	
60	70	Dmytro Drahun	Ukraine	3:30.74	+23.37	
61	60	Marko Skender	Croatia	3:31.91	+24.54	
62	59	Franco Dal Farra	Argentina	3:32.07	+24.70	
63	63	Gabriel Cojocaru	Romania	3:32.17	+24.80	
64	85	Lee Joon-seo	South Korea	3:32.40	+25.03	
65	69	Samuel Ikpefan	Nigeria	3:33.31	+25.94	
66	77	Modestas Vaičiulis	Lithuania	3:34.87	+27.50	
67	71	Strahinja Erić	Bosnia and Herzegovina	3:35.07	+27.70	
68	65	Li Minglin	China	3:35.56	+28.19	
69	62	Mark Chanloung	Thailand	3:35.71	+28.34	
70	61	Oleksandr Lisohor	Ukraine	3:36.57	+29.20	
71	75	Robin Frommelt	Liechtenstein	3:36.60	+29.23	
72	76	Paul Pepene	Romania	3:37.60	+30.23	
73	82	Daniel Peshkov	Bulgaria	3:37.69	+30.32	
74	67	Mario Matikanov	Bulgaria	3:37.97	+30.60	
75	89	Vitaliy Pukhkalo	Kazakhstan	3:38.02	+30.65	
76	88	Amirgali Muratbekov	Kazakhstan	3:38.17	+30.80	
77	58	Niks Saulītis	Latvia	3:38.38	+31.01	
78	80	Mateo Sauma	Argentina	3:38.48	+31.11	
79	68	Dagur Benediktsson	Iceland	3:40.09	+32.72	
80	83	Abdullah Yılmaz	Turkey	3:40.34	+32.97	
81	84	Batmönkhiin Achbadrakh	Mongolia	3:40.75	+33.38	
82	64	Stevenson Savart	Haiti	3:40.92	+33.55	
83	72	Fredrik Fodstad	Colombia	3:41.28	+33.91	
84	66	Tautvydas Strolia	Lithuania	3:42.03	+34.66	
85	86	Nail Bashmakov	Kazakhstan	3:43.00	+35.63	
86	73	Sebastián Endrestad	Chile	3:43.31	+35.94	
87	78	Miloš Milosavljević	Serbia	3:47.03	+39.66	
88	87	Nicolas Claveau-Laviolette	Venezuela	3:47.29	+39.92	
89	90	Stavre Jada	North Macedonia	3:59.56	+52.19	
90	92	Ádám Büki	Hungary	4:02.02	+54.65	
91	93	José Cabeça	Portugal	4:02.77	+55.40	
92	95	Apostolos Angelis	Greece	4:06.03	+58.66	
93	94	Timo Juhani Grönlund	Bolivia	4:06.04	+58.67	
94	91	Artur Saparbekov	Kyrgyzstan	4:36.85	+1:29.48	
	79	Thomas Maloney Westgård	Ireland	Did not start		

=== Quarterfinals ===
Two fastest athletes from each quarterfinal qualified (Q) for semifinals. In addition, two athletes with the fastest times among all others ("lucky losers", LL) also qualified.

Quarterfinal 1

Rank	Seed	Athlete	Country	Time	Deficit	Note
1	1	Johannes Høsflot Klæbo	Norway	3:30.66		Q
2	21	Erik Valnes	Norway	3:30.85	+0.19	Q
3	3	Jules Chappaz	France	3:30.92	+0.26	
4	19	Edvin Anger	Sweden	3:31.15	+0.49	
5	26	Elia Barp	Italy	3:31.48	+0.82	
6	30	Johan Häggström	Sweden	RAL		

Quarterfinal 2

Rank	Seed	Athlete	Country	Time	Deficit	Note
1	2	Ben Ogden	United States	3:26.10		Q
2	7	Alvar Myhlback	Sweden	3:28.39	+2.29	Q
3	15	Federico Pellegrino	Italy	3:28.77	+2.67	LL
4	27	Lauri Vuorinen	Finland	3:28.99	+2.89	LL
5	9	Emil Liekari	Finland	3:29.28	+3.18	
6	22	Théo Schely	France	3:29.37	+3.27	

Quarterfinal 3

Rank	Seed	Athlete	Country	Time	Deficit	Note
1	17	Simone Mocellini	Italy	3:31.03		Q
2	4	Jiří Tuž	Czech Republic	3:31.11	+0.08	Q
3	16	Joni Mäki	Finland	3:31.42	+0.39	
4	10	Lucas Chanavat	France	3:32.22	+1.19	
5	11	Jan Stölben	Germany	3:36.07	+5.04	
6	23	Zak Ketterson	United States	3:53.33	+22.30	

Quarterfinal 4

Rank	Seed	Athlete	Country	Time	Deficit	Note
1	20	Oskar Opstad Vike	Norway	3:31.96		Q
2	28	JC Schoonmaker	United States	3:32.07	+0.11	Q
3	5	Harald Østberg Amundsen	Norway	3:32.50	+0.54	
4	8	Valerio Grond	Switzerland	3:32.54	+0.58	
5	18	Richard Jouve	France	3:41.45	+9.49	
6	29	Bernat Sellés	Spain	3:41.76	+9.80	

Quarterfinal 5

Rank	Seed	Athlete	Country	Time	Deficit	Note
1	25	Anton Grahn	Sweden	3:38.25		Q
2	24	Simone Daprà	Italy	3:38.70	+0.45	Q
3	14	Ondřej Černý	Czech Republic	3:38.72	+0.47	
4	6	Noe Näff	Switzerland	3:39.13	+0.88	
5	12	Janik Riebli	Switzerland	3:39.80	+1.55	
6	13	Jaume Pueyo	Spain	3:40.44	+2.19	

=== Semifinals ===
Two fastest athletes from each semifinal qualified (Q) for the final. In addition, two athletes with the fastest times among all others ("lucky losers", LL) also qualified.

Semifinal 1

Rank	Seed	Athlete	Country	Time	Deficit	Note
1	1	Johannes Høsflot Klæbo	Norway	3:39.72		Q
2	27	Lauri Vuorinen	Finland	3:40.28	+0.56	Q
3	2	Ben Ogden	United States	3:40.32	+0.60	LL
4	21	Erik Valnes	Norway	3:41.48	+1.76	LL
5	7	Alvar Myhlback	Sweden	3:44.47	+4.75	
6	17	Simone Mocellini	Italy	3:56.89	+17.17	

Semifinal 2

Rank	Seed	Athlete	Country	Time	Deficit	Note
1	4	Jiří Tuž	Czech Republic	3:41.00		Q
2	20	Oskar Opstad Vike	Norway	3:41.00	+0.00	Q
3	15	Federico Pellegrino	Italy	3:42.42	+1.42	
4	28	JC Schoonmaker	United States	3:43.16	+2.16	
5	25	Anton Grahn	Sweden	3:44.53	+3.53	
6	24	Simone Daprà	Italy	3:45.12	+4.12	

=== Final ===
The final was held at 13:38.

Rank	Seed	Athlete	Country	Time	Deficit	Note
1st place, gold medalist(s)	1	Johannes Høsflot Klæbo	Norway	3:39.74		
2nd place, silver medalist(s)	2	Ben Ogden	United States	3:40.61	+0.87	
3rd place, bronze medalist(s)	20	Oskar Opstad Vike	Norway	3:46.55	+6.81	
4	27	Lauri Vuorinen	Finland	3:51.39	+11.65	
5	4	Jiří Tuž	Czech Republic	3:58.28	+18.54	
6	21	Erik Valnes	Norway	4:14.58	+34.84	
