= Oskar Opstad Vike =

Norwegian cross-country skier (born 2004)

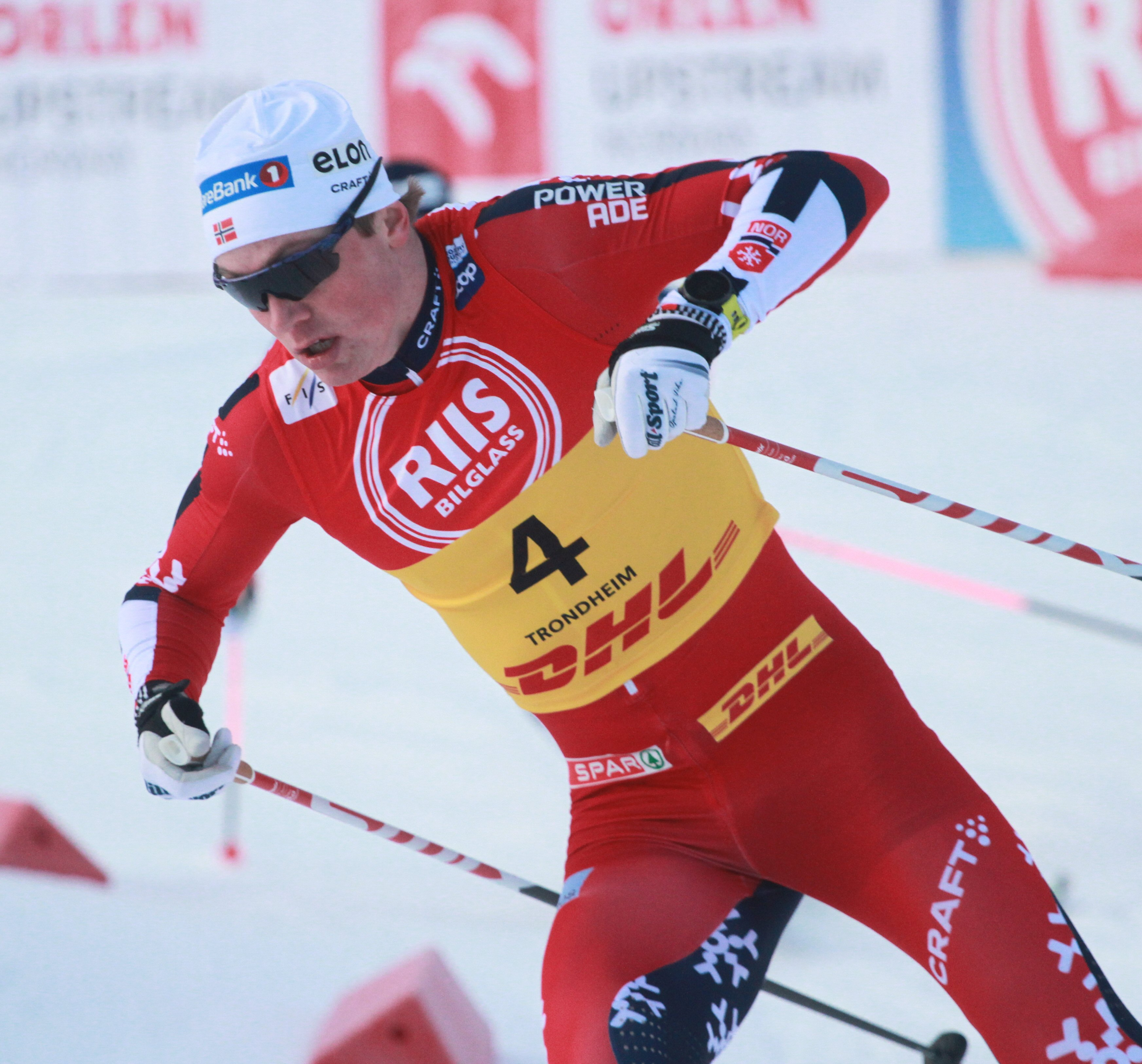
- Vike in 2025

Personal information
- Born: 7 January 2004 (age 22) Tønsberg, Norway

Sport
- Sport: Cross-country skiing
- Club: IL Runar
Medal record
Men's cross-country skiing
Representing Norway
Olympic Games
Bronze medal – third place	2026 Milano Cortina	Individual sprint

Oskar Opstad Vike (born January 7, 2004) is a Norwegian cross-country skier. He won the bronze medal in individual sprint at the 2026 Winter Olympics.
