= Snowboarding at the 2026 Winter Olympics – Qualification =

These are the qualification rules and the quota allocation for the snowboarding events at the 2026 Winter Olympics.

== Qualification standard ==
A total of 238 athletes are able to qualify to compete in the snowboarding events (119 men and 119 women). A country can enter a maximum of 26 athletes across all events, with a maximum of 13 per gender. A total of eight quotas (one per event) is reserved for the host nation, if it fails to qualify in that respective event. Each event also has a minimum FIS points total required per athlete, along with a top 30 finish at a World Cup event during the qualification period (1 July 2024 18 January 2026), or 2025 FIS Snowboarding World Championships. The athlete quota per event is listed below.

Event	Men	Women	Minimum FIS points
Big air/Slopestyle	30	30	50.00
Halfpipe	25	25	50.00
Parallel giant slalom	32	32	100.00
Snowboard cross	32	32	100.00
238 quotas	119	119	

- Big air and slopestyle have a combined event quota.

== Allocation of quotas ==
At the end of the qualification period of 18 January 2024 quotas will be awarded using the Olympic Quota Allocation List (which includes all results of the World Cups from July 2024 and the results of the 2025 World Championship). The spots will be awarded to each country per athlete appearing on the list starting at number one per event until a maximum for each event is reached. Once an NOC has reached the maximum of 4 quota spots in an event, it will no longer be counted for the allocation of quotas. If a nation goes over the total of 13 per sex it is up to that nation to select its team to meet the rules by 19 January 2026. Any vacated spots will be then awarded in that event starting from the first athlete not to be awarded a quota. Slopestyle and Big Air are calculated as one event.

=== Allocation for the mixed team snowboard cross event ===
Any nation that has qualified at least one competitor from each gender, may enter this event. There will be a maximum of 16 teams entered and a maximum of 3 per NOC. Each eligible nation is guaranteed a spot followed by each nation that has 2 eligible, then each nation that has 3 eligible, until the 16 entries are filled.

=== Additional participation for already qualified athletes ===
The halfpipe will have quota limits of 25 athletes in both male and female events. However, athletes who have qualified in slopestyle or big air, and have met the qualification standard in halfpipe, may also compete bringing the event totals up to a maximum of 30 per gender. Similarly the slopestyle and big air events may include athletes who have qualified in halfpipe as long as each event total does not exceed 30 per gender. Australia’s Valentino Guseli, a halfpipe qualifier, was added to the men’s big air start list.

=== Host country places ===
If the host Italy has not earned at least one quota place in each event they will be entitled to one quota within the prescribed maximums, provided the athlete has met the qualification standard.

== Current summary ==
As of 20 January 2026.

NOC	Men				Women				Mixed	Total
NOC	HP	PGS	SC	SS/BA	HP	PGS	SC	SS/BA	SBXT	Total
Australia	2		3		3		3	3	2X	14
Austria	1	4	4	1		3	1	2	X	16
Belgium								2		2
Brazil	2									2
Bulgaria		3				1				4
Canada		2	3	4	3	2	~~3~~ 1	2	X	17
China	2	2		3	4	3	2	1		17
Czech Republic		1	2	1		2	2	1	2X	9
Estonia							1			1
Finland				1				1		2
France			4	2			4		3X	10
Germany	1	4	4	1	3	4	1	1	X	19
Great Britain			1	1			1	2	X	5
Hungary							1			1
Italy	1	4	3	1	~~1~~ 0	4	3	1	2X	17
Japan	4	1		4	4	2	1	4		20
Netherlands			1			1		2		4
New Zealand	1			3				2		6
Norway				3						3
Poland		2				2				4
Romania							2			2
Slovenia		3				1				4
South Korea	3	3			2	1	1	1		11
Spain			2		1			1		4
Switzerland	4	2	1	1	1	4	4	1	X	18
Ukraine						1				1
United States	4	1	4	4	4	1	4	3	2X	25
Total: 27 NOCs	25	32	32	30	25	32	32	30	16	238

=== Next eligible NOC per event ===
The following list shows the next five (or less) eligible NOCs. A country can be eligible for more than one quota spot per event in the reallocation process. NOCs accepting a reallocated quota are listed in bold.

Women

Halfpipe	Parallel	Snowboard Cross	Slopestyle/Big Air
**Australia**; Switzerland; Switzerland; Switzerland; South Korea	Czech Republic; Austria; China; Ukraine; Poland	~~Australia~~; **Japan**; **Hungary**; Austria; Italy	China; Estonia; Hungary; Sweden; Norway

Men

Halfpipe	Parallel	Snowboard Cross	Slopestyle/Big Air
Canada; South Korea; Slovenia; China; Great Britain	Japan; South Korea; Bulgaria; Ukraine; Uzbekistan	Switzerland; Canada; Italy; Czech Republic; Australia	Netherlands; Germany; Finland; Finland; China

Mixed

Snowboard Cross Team
**France**
United States
Australia
Canada
Italy

== See also ==
- Snowboarding at the 2026 Winter Olympics – Men's big air
