= Valerio Grond =

Swiss cross-country skier (born 2000)

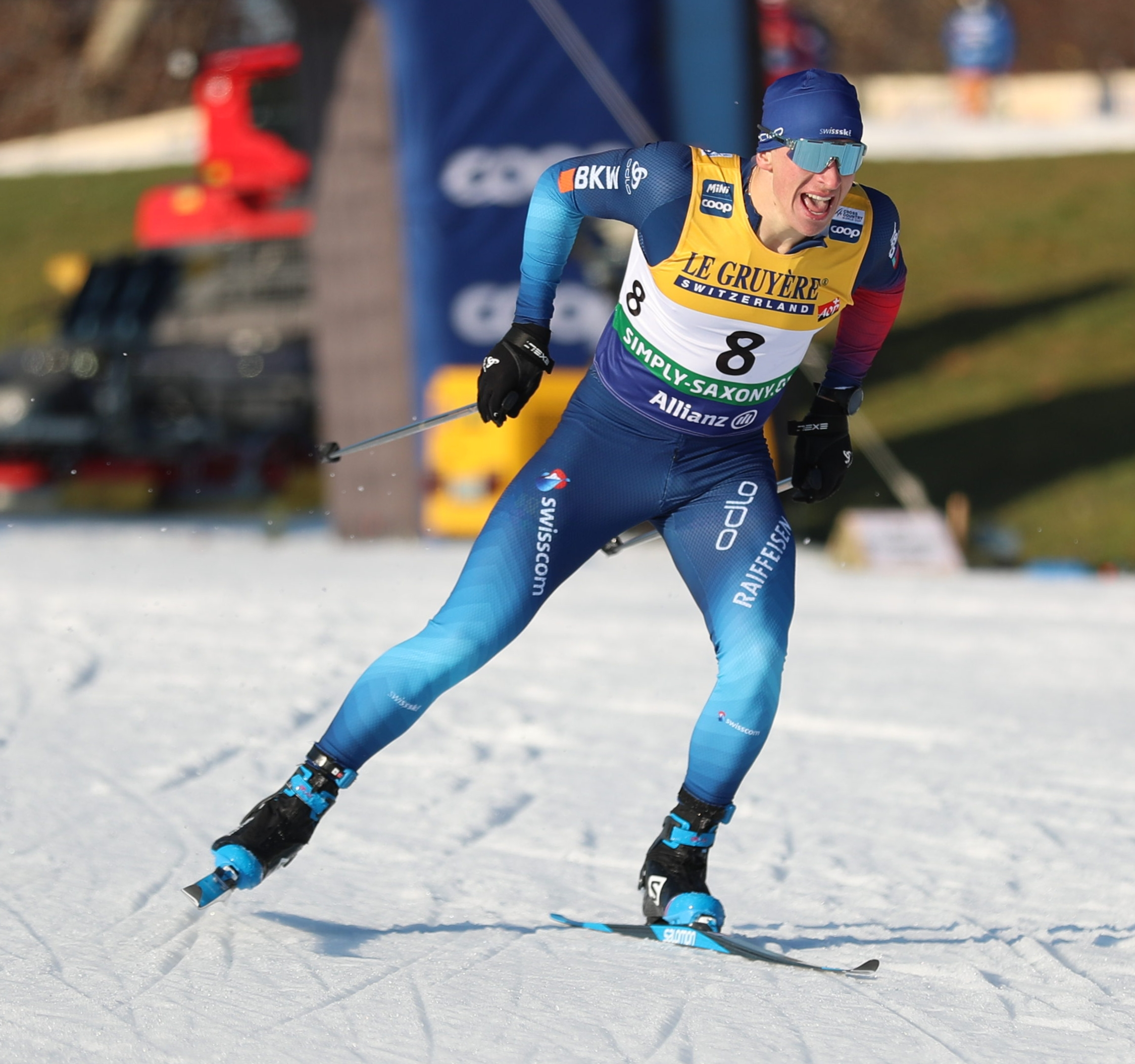
- Grond in 2020

Personal information
- Nationality: Switzerland
- Born: 26 October 2000 (age 25) Davos, Switzerland

Sport
- Sport: Skiing
- Club: SC Davos

World Cup career
- Seasons: 4 – (2021–present)
- Indiv. starts: 34
- Indiv. podiums: 1
- Team starts: 6
- Team podiums: 1
- Team wins: 0
- Overall titles: 0 – (27th in 2024)
- Discipline titles: 0
Medal record
Men's cross-country skiing
Representing Switzerland
World Championships
Silver medal – second place	2025 Trondheim	4 × 7.5 km relay
U23 World Championships
Gold medal – first place	2022 Lygna	Individual sprint
Junior World Championships
Silver medal – second place	2020 Oberwiesenthal	Individual sprint
Bronze medal – third place	2018 Goms	Individual sprint
- Updated on 10 March 2024

Valerio Grond (born 26 October 2000) is a Swiss cross-country skier. He competed in the sprint at the 2022 Winter Olympics.

== Cross-country skiing results ==
All results are sourced from the International Ski Federation (FIS).

=== Olympic Games ===
Year	Age	15 km individual	30 km skiathlon	50 km mass start	Sprint	4 × 10 km relay	Team sprint
2022	21	—	—	—^{[a]}	18	—	—
2026	25	—	—	—	18	9	4

^{a} Distance reduced to 30 km due to weather conditions.

=== World Championships ===
Year	Age	15 km individual	30 km skiathlon	50 km mass start	Sprint	4 × 10 km relay	Team sprint
2021	20	—	—	—	36	—	—

=== World Cup ===
==== Season standings ====
Season	Age	Discipline standings				Ski Tour standings	
Season	Age	Overall	Distance	Sprint	U23	Nordic Opening	Tour de Ski
2021	20	62	—	24	6	—	DNF
2022	21	54	—	28	5	—N/a	DNF
2023	22	30	—	13	5	—N/a	DNF
2024	23	27	102	7	—N/a	—N/a	DNF
2025	24	32	81	10	—N/a	—N/a	DNF

==== Individual podiums ====
- 1 podium – (1 WC)

No.	Season	Date	Location	Race	Level	Place
1	2023–24	3 March 2024	Lahti, Finland	1.5 km Sprint F	World Cup	3rd

==== Team podiums ====
- 2 podiums – (2 TS)

No.	Season	Date	Location	Race	Level	Place	Teammate
1	2022–23	22 January 2023	Livigno, Italy	6 × 1.2 km Team Sprint F	World Cup	3rd	Riebli
2	2024–25	13 December 2024	Davos, Switzerland	6 × 1.2 km Team Sprint F	World Cup	2nd	Riebli
