= Cross-country skiing at the 2026 Winter Olympics – Men's team sprint =

Cross-country skiing men's team sprint at the 2026 Winter Olympics was held in Tesero

Men's team sprint at the XXV Olympic Winter Games
- Cross-country skiing
- Venue: Cross country and biathlon center Fabio Canal, Tesero
- Date: 18 February 2026
- Competitors: 54 from 27 nations
- Teams: 27
- Winning time: 18:28.98

Medalists
1st place, gold medalist(s)		Einar Hedegart; Johannes Høsflot Klæbo	Norway
2nd place, silver medalist(s)		Ben Ogden; Gus Schumacher	United States
3rd place, bronze medalist(s)		Elia Barp; Federico Pellegrino	Italy

The men's team sprint competition in cross-country skiing at the 2026 Winter Olympics was held on 18 February, over a 1.585-kilometre (0.985 mi) course at the Cross country and biathlon center Fabio Canal, in Tesero. Einar Hedegart and Johannes Høsflot Klæbo of Norway won the event, which made Klæbo a 10-time Olympic champion, extending his record for the most gold medals at the Winter Games. He won gold in all six of his events at the 2026 Olympics. Ben Ogden and Gus Schumacher of the United States won silver, the first medal for the country in the event, and Elia Barp and Federico Pellegrino of Italy won bronze. This was Schumacher's first Olympic medal.

== Background ==
The 2022 champions, Erik Valnes and Johannes Høsflot Klæbo, qualified for the Olympics, as did the silver medalists Iivo Niskanen and Joni Mäki. Valnes and Niskanen did not participate in the event, as both Klæbo and Mäki competed with different partners. The bronze medalists, Alexander Bolshunov and Alexander Terentyev, were barred from participation in all international team events after the start of the Russian invasion of Ukraine. There were only two team sprint events in the 2025–26 FIS Cross-Country World Cup before the Olympics. Valnes and Klæbo won one, and Harald Østberg Amundsen and Einar Hedegart another one. Valnes and Klæbo were also the 2025 world champions in team sprint.

== Results ==
=== Qualification ===
Rank	Bib	Country	Time	Deficit	Notes
1	2	United States; Ben Ogden; Gus Schumacher	5:45.72; 2:52.91; 2:52.81		Q
2	1	Norway; Einar Hedegart; Johannes Høsflot Klæbo	5:48.39; 2:59.27; 2:49.12	+2.67	Q
3	3	Italy; Elia Barp; Federico Pellegrino	5:49.10; 2:55.60; 2:53.50	+3.38	Q
4	8	Switzerland; Janik Riebli; Valerio Grond	5:50.34; 2:56.58; 2:53.76	+4.62	Q
5	14	Spain; Jaume Pueyo; Marc Colell	5:52.21; 2:51.75; 3:00.46	+6.49	Q
6	4	France; Mathis Desloges; Jules Chappaz	5:52.67; 2:58.87; 2:53.80	+6.95	Q
7	11	Austria; Michael Föttinger; Benjamin Moser	5:53.19; 2:56.96; 2:56.23	+7.47	Q
8	7	Finland; Lauri Vuorinen; Joni Mäki	5:53.62; 2:58.35; 2:55.27	+7.90	Q
9	17	Australia; Lars Young Vik; Hugo Hinckfuss	5:53.68; 2:55.64; 2:58.04	+7.96	Q
10	12	Germany; Jakob Moch; Jan Stölben	5:54.42; 3:01.05; 2:53.37	+8.70	Q
11	6	Czech Republic; Jiří Tuž; Michal Novák	5:54.97; 2:58.58; 2:56.39	+9.25	Q
12	5	Sweden; Johan Häggström; Edvin Anger	5:55.20; 2:59.39; 2:55.81	+9.48	Q
13	9	Great Britain; Andrew Musgrave; James Clugnet	5:55.49; 2:59.99; 2:55.50	+9.77	Q
14	10	Canada; Antoine Cyr; Xavier McKeever	5:56.69; 2:58.32; 2:58.37	+10.97	Q
15	13	Poland; Maciej Staręga; Dominik Bury	5:57.70; 2:57.68; 3:00.02	+11.98	Q
16	15	Slovenia; Miha Šimenc; Nejc Štern	6:01.37; 3:00.47; 3:00.90	+15.65	
17	18	Latvia; Lauris Kaparkalējs; Raimo Vīgants	6:05.25; 3:02.30; 3:02.95	+19.53	
18	16	Estonia; Karl Sebastian Dremljuga; Martin Himma	6:05.36; 3:04.07; 3:01.29	+19.64	
19	19	China; Wang Qiang; Li Minglin	6:12.91; 3:02.80; 3:10.11	+27.19	
20	24	Slovakia; Tomáš Cenek; Peter Hinds	6:15.18; 3:10.96; 3:04.22	+29.46	
21	27	Lithuania; Modestas Vaičiulis; Tautvydas Strolia	6:17.24; 3:04.27; 3:12.97	+31.52	
22	23	Bulgaria; Mario Matikanov; Daniel Peshkov	6:18.21; 3:05.46; 3:12.75	+32.49	
23	21	Ukraine; Dmytro Drahun; Oleksandr Lisohor	6:20.13; 3:07.53; 3:12.60	+34.41	
24	20	Romania; Paul Constantin Pepene; Gabriel Cojocaru	6:20.24; 3:13.32; 3:06.92	+34.52	
25	25	Argentina; Franco Dal Farra; Mateo Sauma	6:23.54; 3:06.69; 3:16.85	+37.82	
26	26	Hungary; Ádám Kónya; Ádám Büki	6:34.91; 3:10.63; 3:24.28	+49.19	
27	22	Kazakhstan; Nail Bashmakov; Amirgali Muratbekov	6:35.34; 3:18.49; 3:16.85	+49.62	

=== Final ===
Rank	Bib	Country	Athletes	Time	Deficit
1st place, gold medalist(s)	1	Norway	Einar Hedegart; Johannes Høsflot Klæbo	18:28.98	—
2nd place, silver medalist(s)	2	United States	Ben Ogden; Gus Schumacher	18:30.35	+1.37
3rd place, bronze medalist(s)	3	Italy	Elia Barp; Federico Pellegrino	18:32.29	+3.31
4	8	Switzerland	Janik Riebli; Valerio Grond	18:33.20	+4.22
5	9	Great Britain	Andrew Musgrave; James Clugnet	18:36.59	+7.61
6	10	Canada	Antoine Cyr; Xavier McKeever	18:38.69	+9.71
7	11	Austria	Michael Föttinger; Benjamin Moser	18:39.37	+10.39
8	6	Czech Republic	Jiří Tuž; Michal Novák	18:42.61	+13.63
9	12	Germany	Jakob Moch; Jan Stölben	18:43.14	+14.16
10	5	Sweden	Johan Häggström; Edvin Anger	18:46.67 PF	+17.69
11	7	Finland	Lauri Vuorinen; Joni Mäki	18:46.67 PF	+17.69
12	4	France	Mathis Desloges; Jules Chappaz	18:47.87	+18.89
13	13	Poland	Maciej Staręga; Dominik Bury	18:49.03	+20.05
14	17	Australia	Lars Young Vik; Hugo Hinckfuss	18:54.65	+25.67
15	14	Spain	Jaume Pueyo; Marc Colell Pantebre	19:06.33	+37.35
