= Bobsleigh at the 2026 Winter Olympics – Qualification =

The following is about the qualification rules and the quota allocation for the bobsleigh at the 2026 Winter Olympics.

== Qualification rules ==
A maximum of 170 quota spots are available to athletes to compete at the games. A maximum 114 men and 56 women may qualify. Qualification will be based primarily on the combined ranking list of the 2025/2026 season until the deadline of 18 January 2026. Pilots must compete in eight different races on three different tracks between 1 October 2024 and 18 January 2026, and must be ranked in at least five of those races. Additionally, the pilot must be ranked among the top 50 for the men's events or top 40 for the women's events.

For the women's races the IBSF combined ranking will be used for the all but the final six individual quotas in monobob. Those final six quotas will be determined by using the women's monobob IBSF ranking list. For the men's events the IBSF combined ranking list will determine all twenty-eight sleds for both two-man and four-man.

NOC's per event

Number of sleds	Men	Women's monobob	2-women
3	2	2	3
2	6	4	5
1	10	11	6
	28	25	25

== Quota allocation ==
There were seven world cup races during the qualification period, so sleds were ranked in their respective combined ranking list, or women's monobob ranking list, by their best seven results during the qualification period.

=== Current summary ===
Final quotas as determined by the IBSF. There was one quota reallocated, in men's.

NOC	Men	Women		Athletes
NOC	Men	Monobob	Two woman	Athletes
Australia		1	2	4
Austria	2	1	2	12
Belgium		1		1
Brazil	1			4
Canada	2	2	3	14
China	2	2	2	12
Denmark		1		1
France	1	1	1	6
Germany	3	3	3	18
Great Britain	1	1	1	6
Israel	1			4
Italy	1	2	2	8
Jamaica	1	1		5
Latvia	2			8
Liechtenstein	1			4
Netherlands	1			4
Poland		1	1	2
Romania	1			4
Slovakia		1	1	2
South Korea	2	1	1	10
Switzerland	3	2	2	16
Chinese Taipei		1	1	2
Trinidad and Tobago	1			4
United States	2	3	3	14
Total: 23 NOCs	28	25	25	165

=== Men ===
- Number in parentheses indicates rank of relevant pilot.

Sleds qualified	Countries	Athletes total	Nation
3	2	24	Germany (3rd); Switzerland (17th)
2	6	48	United States (18th); Canada (19th); South Korea (25th); ~~Great Britain (28th)~~ China (29th); Latvia (30th); Austria (32nd)
1	10	40	Great Britain (4th); Italy (8th); France (12th); Romania (15th); Brazil (21st); Netherlands (23rd); Liechtenstein (24th); Jamaica (26th); Trinidad and Tobago (31st); Israel (33rd)
28	18	112	

=== Women's monobob ===
Sleds qualified	Countries	Athletes total	Nation
3	2	6	Germany (6th); United States (8th)
2	4	8	Canada (10th); Switzerland (13th); China (28th); Italy (30th)
1 (Note: qualifies through combined ranking)	5	5	Austria (4th); France (11th); Australia (12th); South Korea (18th); Great Britain (20th)
1 (Note: qualifies through monobob ranking)	6	6	Denmark (15th); Chinese Taipei (16th); Poland (19th); Slovakia (24th); Jamaica (25th); Belgium (30th)
25	17	25	

=== Two woman ===
Sleds qualified	Countries	Athletes total	Nation
3	3	18	Germany (6th); United States (8th); Canada (14th)
2	5	20	Switzerland (13th); China (28th); Italy (30th); Australia (33rd); Austria (35th)
1	6	12	France (11th); South Korea (18th); Great Britain (20th); Poland (21st); Slovakia (22nd); Chinese Taipei (23rd)
25	14	50	

=== Next eligible NOC per event ===
Only NOCs not already qualified are considered. Bolded nations accepted a reallocated quota.

Men	Women's monobob	Two woman
**Israel** (33rd); Australia (38th); Czech Republic (39th); Croatia (41st); Thailand (44th)	Nigeria (33rd); Spain (34th); Latvia (35th); Thailand (36th); Czech Republic (37th)	Jamaica (25th); Belgium (27th); Thailand (29th); Latvia (31st); Romania (34th)
