= Janik Riebli =

Swiss cross-country skier (born 1998)

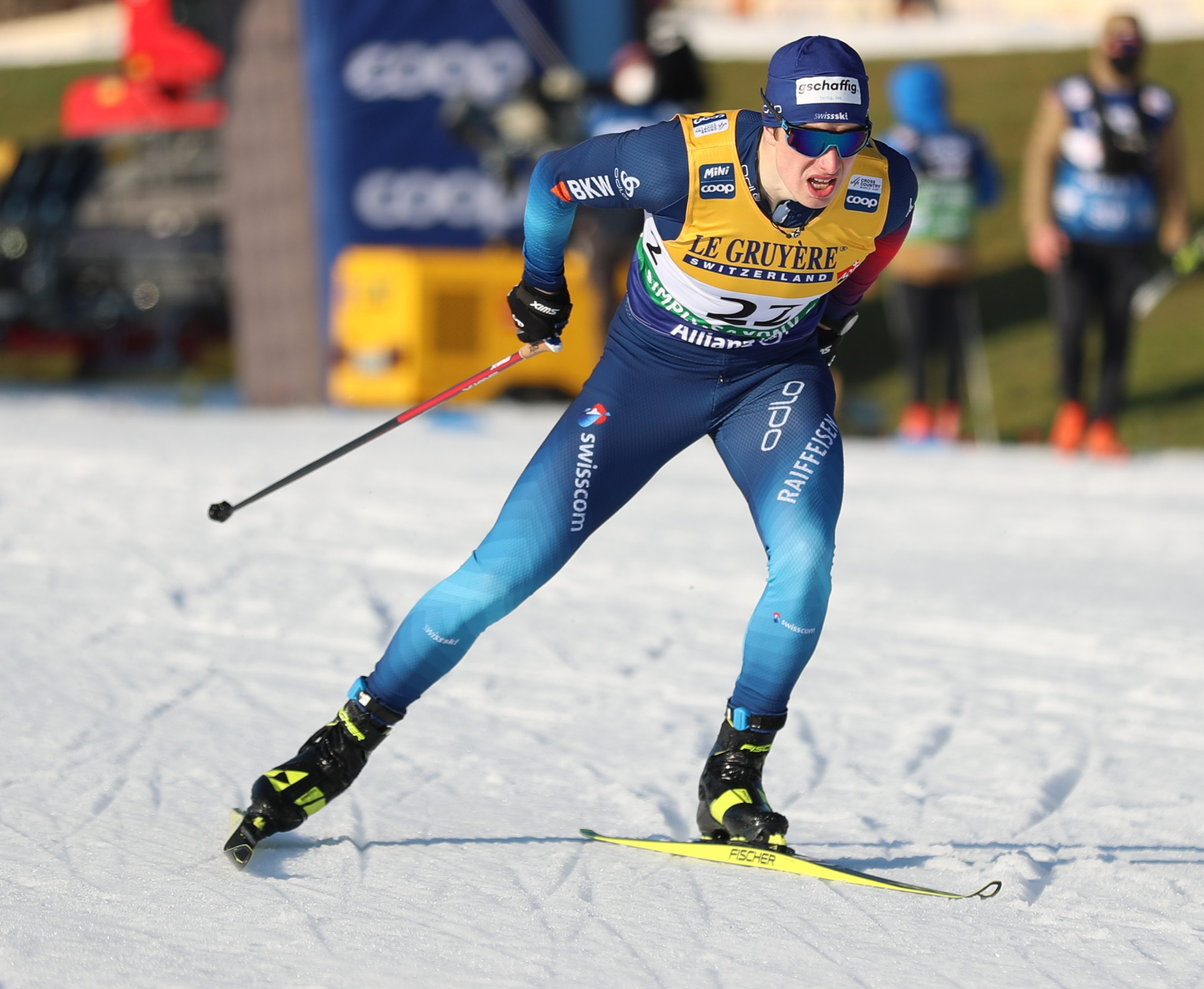

Personal information
- Nationality: Switzerland
- Born: 27 October 1998 (age 27) Giswil, Switzerland

Sport
- Sport: Skiing
- Club: Schwendi-Langis

World Cup career
- Seasons: 6 – (2021–present)
- Indiv. starts: 71
- Indiv. podiums: 2
- Team starts: 12
- Team podiums: 3
- Team wins: 0
- Overall titles: 0 – (36th in 2026)
- Discipline titles: 0
- Updated on 22 March 2026

Janik Riebli (born 27 October 1998) is a Swiss cross-country skier. He competed in the 2026 Winter Olympics.

== Personal life ==
Riebli was raised on a farm and he works on his family farm in Switzerland helping to manage some 30 cows when he is not training cross country.

== Cross-country skiing results ==
All results are sourced from the International Ski Federation (FIS).

=== Olympic Games ===
Year	Age	15 km individual	30 km skiathlon	50 km mass start	Sprint	4 × 10 km relay	Team sprint
2026	27	—	—	—	23	—	4

=== World Championships ===
Year	Age	15 km individual	30 km skiathlon	50 km mass start	Sprint	4 × 10 km relay	Team sprint
2023	24	—	—	—	43	—	13
2025	26	—	—	—	26	—	8

=== World Cup ===
==== Season standings ====
Season	Age	Discipline standings				Ski Tour standings	
Season	Age	Overall	Distance	Sprint	U23	Nordic Opening	Tour de Ski
2021	22	59	—	21	5	—	DNF
2022	23	64	—	31	—N/a	—N/a	DNF
2023	24	46	—	20	—N/a	—N/a	DNF
2024	25	47	—	19	—N/a	—N/a	DNF
2025	26	37	—	10	—N/a	—N/a	54
2026	27	36	113	13	—N/a	—N/a	DNF

==== Individual podiums ====
- 2 podium – (1 WC, 1 SWC)

No.	Season	Date	Location	Race	Level	Place
1	2022–23	21 January 2023	Livigno, Italy	1.2 km Sprint F	World Cup	3rd
2	2024–25	28 December 2024	Toblach, Italy	1.4 km Sprint F	Stage World Cup	3rd

==== Team podiums ====
- 3 podiums – (3 TS)

No.	Season	Date	Location	Race	Level	Place	Teammate
1	2022–23	22 January 2023	Livigno, Italy	6 × 1.2 km Team Sprint F	World Cup	3rd	Grond
2	2024–25	13 December 2024	Davos, Switzerland	6 × 1.2 km Team Sprint F	World Cup	2nd	Grond
3	2024–25	22 March 2025	Lahti, Finland	6 × 1.5 km Team Sprint F	World Cup	2nd	Grond
