= Skeleton at the 2026 Winter Olympics – Qualification =

The following is about the qualification rules and the quota allocation for skeleton at the 2026 Winter Olympics.

== Qualification system ==
A total of 50 quota spots (25 per gender) will be available to athletes to compete at the games. A maximum of six athletes (three per gender) can be entered by a NOC. Additionally, for the first time, mixed teams can be entered with a maximum of two per NOC and total of twenty teams.

The World Ranking list as of January 18, 2026 will be used to distribute the quotas. Athletes will be ranked by their best seven results. At total of two countries in each gender will qualify the maximum of three athletes, while six countries will qualify two men, (four for women), seven countries will qualify one quota in the men's event and 11 for the women's. If the host nation Italy fails to qualify in an event, the highest ranked sled from the country will take the last qualification slot. For the mixed team event only already qualified individual athletes may compete, with a maximum of two teams per NOC.

An athlete must be ranked in the top 70 (men) or top 55 (women) to be eligible to compete at the games in Italy.

== Qualification timeline ==
The IBSF ranking list uses races from the 2025–26 Skeleton World Cup, but also includes results from Asia, Europe, and America cup races. Athletes must have competed in at least eight races across at least three different tracks in the past two seasons, to be eligible.

== Quota allocation ==
The following the final breakdown of Olympic qualification quotas after the completion of all applicable races, based on the IBSF rankings and adjustments. Canada returned one men's quota which was taken by Japan.

=== Summary ===
Nations	Men	Women	Mixed team(s)	Athletes
Australia	1	0		1
Austria	2	1	X	3
Belgium	0	1		1
Brazil	0	1		1
Canada	1	2	X	3
China	3	2	2X	5
Czech Republic	0	1		1
Denmark	1	1	X	2
Estonia	0	1		1
France	1	0		1
Germany	3	3	2X	6
Great Britain	2	3	2X	5
Israel	1	0		1
Italy	2	2	2X	4
Japan	1	0		1
Latvia	1	1	X	2
Netherlands	0	1		1
Puerto Rico	0	1		1
South Africa	0	1		1
South Korea	2	1	X	3
Switzerland	1	0		1
Ukraine	1	0		1
United States	2	2	2X	4
Total: 22 NOCs	25	25	15	50

=== Men ===
Sleds qualified	Countries	Athletes total	Nation
3	2	6	Germany (10th); China (14th)
2	5	10	Great Britain (3rd); Italy (12th); South Korea (16th); Austria (29th); ~~Canada (34th)~~ United States (35th)
1	9	9	Canada; Ukraine (11th); Denmark (15th); France (17th); Australia (25th); Latvia (26th); Switzerland (32nd); Israel (36th); Japan (39th)
25	16	25	

=== Women ===
Sleds qualified	Countries	Athletes total	Nation
3	2	6	Germany (7th); Great Britain (11th)
2	4	8	United States (17th); China (18th); Italy (21st); Canada (25th)
1	11	11	Belgium (1st); Czech Republic (4th); Austria (5th); Netherlands (8th); Brazil (9th); South Korea (20th); Latvia (26th); Estonia (29th); South Africa (30th); Puerto Rico (32nd); Denmark (35th)
25	17	25	

=== Next eligible NOC per event ===
Only NOCs not already qualified are considered. Bolded nations accepted a reallocated quota.

Men's	Women's
**Japan** (39th); Malaysia (41st); Chinese Taipei (42nd); Spain (44th); Brazil (48th)	Switzerland (36th); Colombia (42nd); Finland (43rd); Virgin Islands (44th); Malta (46th)
