= Freestyle skiing at the 2026 Winter Olympics – Qualification =

The following is about the qualification rules and the quota allocation for the freestyle skiing events at the 2026 Winter Olympics.

== Qualification standard ==
An athlete must have placed in the top 30 at a World Cup event during the qualification period (1 July 2024 to 18 January 2026) in that respective event and also have a minimum number of FIS points; 80 for all aerials, moguls, dual moguls, and ski-cross or 50 for halfpipe, slopestyle, or big air.

A total of 284 quota spots are available to athletes to compete at the games. A maximum of 30 athletes can be entered by a National Olympic Committee, with a maximum of 16 men or 16 women. If a NOC has qualified enough athletes to enter the mixed team event in aerials then they may extend their total to 32 athletes.

Event	Men	Women	Minimum FIS points
Aerials	25	25	80.00
Big air / Slopestyle	30	30	50.00
Halfpipe	25	25	50.00
Moguls / Dual Moguls	30	30	80.00
Ski cross	32	32	80.00
284 quotas	142	142	

- Big air + slopestyle and moguls + dual moguls have a combined event quota.

== Allocation of quotas ==
At the end of the qualification period of 18 January 2026 quotas will be awarded using the Olympic Quota Allocation List (which includes all results of the World Cups from July 2024 and the results of the 2025 World Championship). The spots will be awarded to each country per athlete appearing on the list starting at number one per event until a maximum for each event is reached, except for the aerials events which will stop at 22 of 25. Once an NOC has reached the maximum of 4 quota spots in an event, it will no longer be counted for the allocation of quotas. If a nation goes over the total of 16 per sex or 30 (32 if entered in the mixed team aerials) total it is up to that nation to select its team to meet the rules by 20 January 2026. Any vacated spots will be then awarded in that event starting from the first athlete not to be awarded a quota. Freeski Slopestyle and Freeski Big Air are calculated as one event.

=== Allocation for the mixed team aerials event ===
Any nation that has qualified at least three athletes in the aerials competitions, and at least one from each gender, may enter this event. If less than eight teams have the required number of athletes then NOCs that need either one more male or female competitor will be awarded a quota to enable participation in the team event. Once eight teams are formed, and if there is still less than 25 quotas filled in the male or female events, then the allocation process described above will continue.

=== Additional participation for already qualified athletes ===
The halfpipe will have quota limits of 25 athletes in both male and female events. However, athletes who have qualified in slopestyle or big air, and have met the qualification standard in halfpipe, may also compete bringing the event totals up to a maximum of 30 per gender. Similarly the slopestyle and big air events may include athletes who have qualified in halfpipe as long as each event total does not exceed 30 per gender.

=== Host country places ===
If the host Italy has not earned at least one quota place in each event they will be entitled to one quota within the prescribed maximums, provided the athlete has met the qualification standard.

== Current summary ==
- Final allocations were presented by the FIS on 19 January 2026. Reallocation, where noted, has followed.

NOC	Men					Women					Mixed	Total
NOC	AE	HP	MO/DM	SS/BA	SX	AE	HP	MO/DM	SS/BA	SX	AT	Total
Australia	1		4			4	1	3	~~2~~ 1	1	X	15
Austria		1		2	4			2	1	3		13
Canada	4	~~4~~ 3	~~4~~ 3	~~4~~ 2	4	~~3~~ 1	4	4	4	~~4~~ 3	X	32
Chile										1		1
China	4	4				4	4	2	4	2	X	24
Czech Republic	1		1		1	1				2		6
Estonia		1		1			2					4
Finland			4	3					1			8
France		1	4	2	4			3	~~2~~ 1	4		19
Germany					4	1	1	~~1~~ 0	1	4		11
Great Britain		2	1	1	1		1	1	1			8
Individual Neutral Athletes						3						3
Ireland		1					~~1~~ 0					1
Italy	~~1~~ 0	~~1~~ 0	~~1~~ 0	1	4	~~1~~ 0	~~1~~ 0	1	2	2		10
Japan	1	1	4		3	1	1	4	2	3		20
Kazakhstan	4		1			1		3			X	9
New Zealand		4		3			~~2~~ 1		2			10
Norway				4					1			5
Slovakia										1		1
South Africa								1				1
South Korea		2	2				2	1				7
Sweden			~~4~~ 2	3	~~3~~ 2			~~2~~ 1		~~3~~ 2		10
Switzerland	2	~~2~~ 1		4	4	1			4	4	X	20
Ukraine	4					4			1		X	9
United States	4	4	4	4	~~2~~ 0	4	4	4	4	~~2~~ 0	X	32
Total: 25 NOCs	25	25	30	30	31	25	21	30	30	32	7	279

=== Next eligible NOC per event ===
A country can be eligible for more than one quota spot per event in the reallocation process. Bolded NOCs have accepted a quota, NOCs with a strike through have declined that option.

Women

Aerials	Halfpipe	Moguls	Slopestyle/Big Air	Ski Cross
**Ukraine**; **Individual Neutral Athletes**; **Individual Neutral Athletes**; Kazakhstan; Kazakhstan	~~South Korea~~	~~Netherlands~~; **China**; **South Korea**; Kazakhstan; Great Britain	**United States**; **Italy**; Japan; New Zealand; Great Britain	**Japan**; **China**; **Slovakia**; **Czech Republic**

Men

Aerials	Halfpipe	Moguls	Slopestyle/Big Air	Ski Cross
**Japan**; Individual Neutral Athletes; Individual Neutral Athletes	**China**; **France**; **South Korea**; Japan; South Korea	**Australia**; **France**; **Finland**; **France**; Germany	**Finland**; **New Zealand**; Austria; Spain; Italy	**Czech Republic**; **Japan**; ~~Sweden~~; ~~Great Britain~~
