= Manuel Aramayo =

Bolivian alpine skier (1955–1999)

Personal information
- Nationality: Bolivian
- Born: 24 December 1955
- Died: 13 July 1999 (aged 43)
- Relative: Carlos Aramayo (brother)

Sport
- Sport: Alpine skiing

Manuel Aramayo (24 December 1955 – 13 July 1999) was a Bolivian alpine skier. He competed at the 1988 Winter Olympics and the 1992 Winter Olympics in the slalom event.

== Family ==
Manuel Aramayo was the older brother of Carlos Aramayo, who competed in the 1992 Winter Olympics in Albertville in the giant slalom.
