= Victor Hugo Ascarrunz Jr. =

Bolivian alpine skier (born 1960)

Personal information
- Nationality: Bolivian
- Born: 22 December 1960 (age 64); Hollywood, California, United States

Sport
- Sport: Alpine skiing

Victor Hugo Ascarrunz Fonseca Jr. (born 22 December 1960) is a Bolivian alpine skier. He competed in two events at the 1980 Winter Olympics.
