= James Clugnet =

British cross-country skier (born 1996)

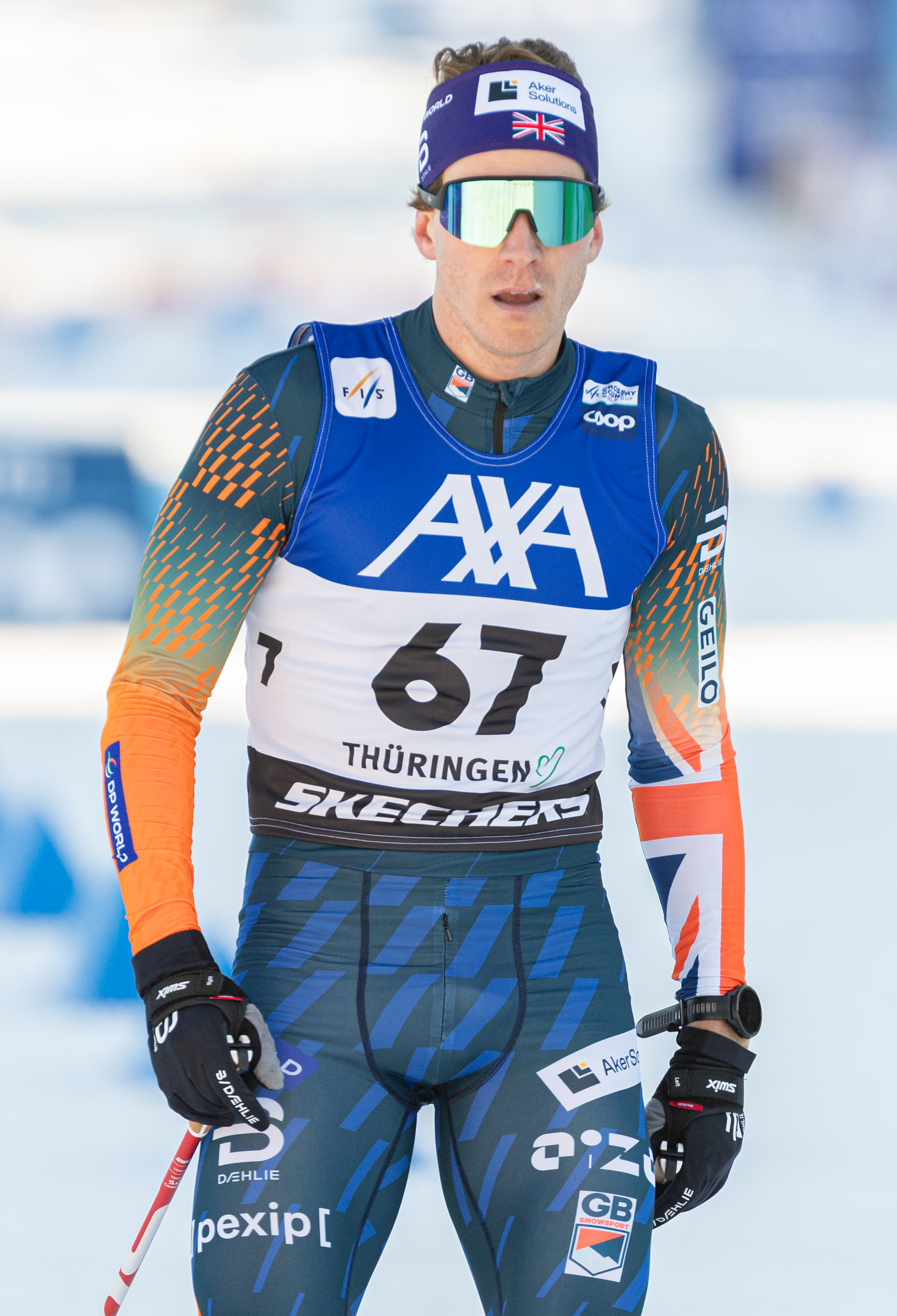
- Clugnet in 2026

Personal information
- Nationality: United Kingdom
- Born: 4 December 1996 (age 29) Grenoble, France

Sport
- Sport: Skiing
- Club: Highland Nordic

World Cup career
- Seasons: 6 – (2018–present)
- Indiv. starts: 67
- Indiv. podiums: 0
- Team starts: 10
- Team podiums: 0
- Overall titles: 0 – (66th in 2021)
- Discipline titles: 0
- Updated on 29 March 2023

James Clugnet (born 4 December 1996) is a British cross-country skier. He competed in the sprint at the 2022 Winter Olympics Clugnet also competed at the 2026 Winter Olympics, individually in the 10 kilometre freestyle and sprint, and then teaming up with Andrew Musgrave to achieve Great Britain's best result in Olympic cross-country skiing by finishing fifth in the team sprint.

== Cross-country skiing results ==
All results are sourced from the International Ski Federation (FIS).

=== Olympic Games ===
Year	Age	15 km individual	30 km skiathlon	50 km mass start	Sprint	4 × 10 km relay	Team sprint
2022	25	—	—	—^{[a]}	40	—	20

^{a} Distance reduced to 30 km due to weather conditions.

=== World Championships ===
Year	Age	15 km individual	30 km skiathlon	50 km mass start	Sprint	4 × 10 km relay	Team sprint
2017	20	67	—	—	75	—	—
2019	22	—	—	—	25	—	13
2021	24	62	—	—	40	—	13
2023	26	—	—	—	48	—	6

=== World Cup ===
==== Season standings ====
Season	Age	Discipline standings				Ski Tour standings			
Season	Age	Overall	Distance	Sprint	U23	Nordic Opening	Tour de Ski	Ski Tour 2020	World Cup Final
2018	21	NC	NC	NC	NC	DNF	—	—N/a	78
2019	22	79	NC	39	13	DNF	DNF	—N/a	58
2020	23	73	NC	34	—N/a	—	DNF	DNF	—N/a
2021	24	66	NC	26	—N/a	—	DNF	—N/a	—N/a
2022	25	82	NC	43	—N/a	—N/a	DNF	—N/a	—N/a
2023	26	78	117	33	—N/a	—N/a	DNF	—N/a	—N/a
