= Billy Farwig =

Bolivian alpine skier (born 1957)

Personal information
- Born: 24 October 1957 (age 69) La Paz, Bolivia

Sport
- Sport: Alpine skiing

Billy Farwig (born 24 October 1957) is a Bolivian alpine skier. He competed in three events at the 1980 Winter Olympics.
