= Daniel Stahle =

Bolivian alpine skier (born 1974)

Personal information
- Nationality: Bolivian
- Born: 12 November 1974 (age 50)

Sport
- Sport: Alpine skiing

Daniel Stahle (born 12 November 1974) is a Bolivian alpine skier. He competed in two events at the 1992 Winter Olympics.
