= Enrique Montano (alpine skier) =

Bolivian alpine skier (born 1964)

Personal information
- Nationality: Bolivian
- Born: 18 August 1964 (age 62)

Sport
- Sport: Alpine skiing

Enrique Montano (born 18 August 1964) is a Bolivian alpine skier. He competed in two events at the 1988 Winter Olympics.
