= René Farwig =

Bolivian alpine skier (born 1935)

Personal information
- Nationality: Bolivian
- Born: 30 September 1935 (age 91) Valencia, Spain

Sport
- Sport: Alpine skiing

René Farwig (born 30 September 1935) is a Bolivian alpine skier. He competed in two events at the 1956 Winter Olympics.
