= Jiří Tuž =

Czech cross-country skier (born 2004)

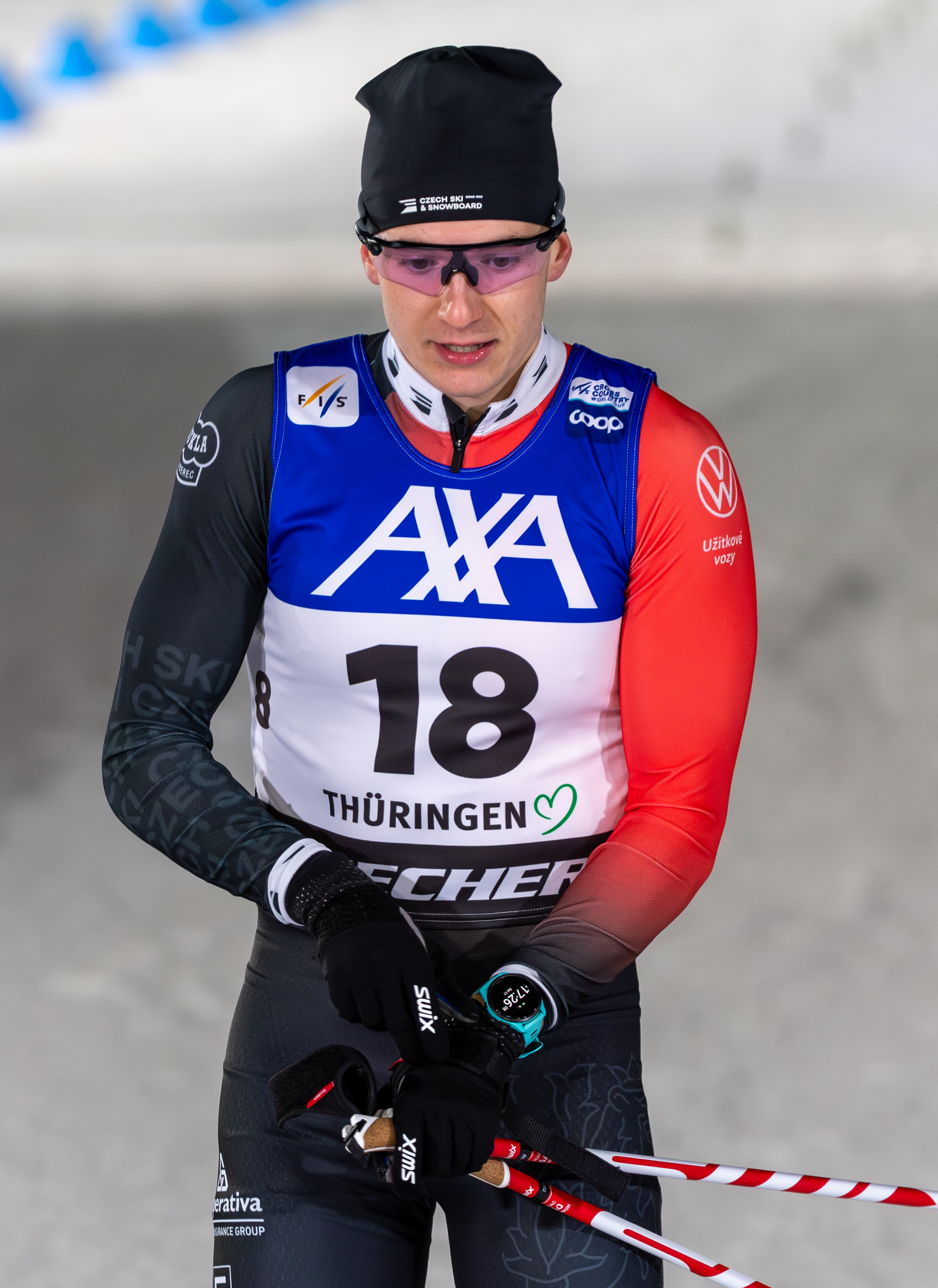
- Tuž in 2026

Personal information
- Nationality: Czech Republic
- Born: 23 November 2004 (age 21) Frýdlant, Czech Republic

Sport
- Sport: Skiing

World Cup career
- Seasons: 3 – (2023–present)
- Indiv. starts: 17
- Team starts: 3
- Updated on 10 February 2026

Jiří Tuž (born 23 November 2004) is a Czech cross-country skier who represented the Czech Republic at the 2026 Winter Olympics.

== Career ==
In January 2026, he was selected to represent the Czech Republic at the 2026 Winter Olympics. During the individual sprint qualification he finished in fourth and advanced to the quarterfinals. Tuž would eventually advance into the final, placing fifth overall in the event.
