= Omar Aramayo =

Peruvian poet and composer

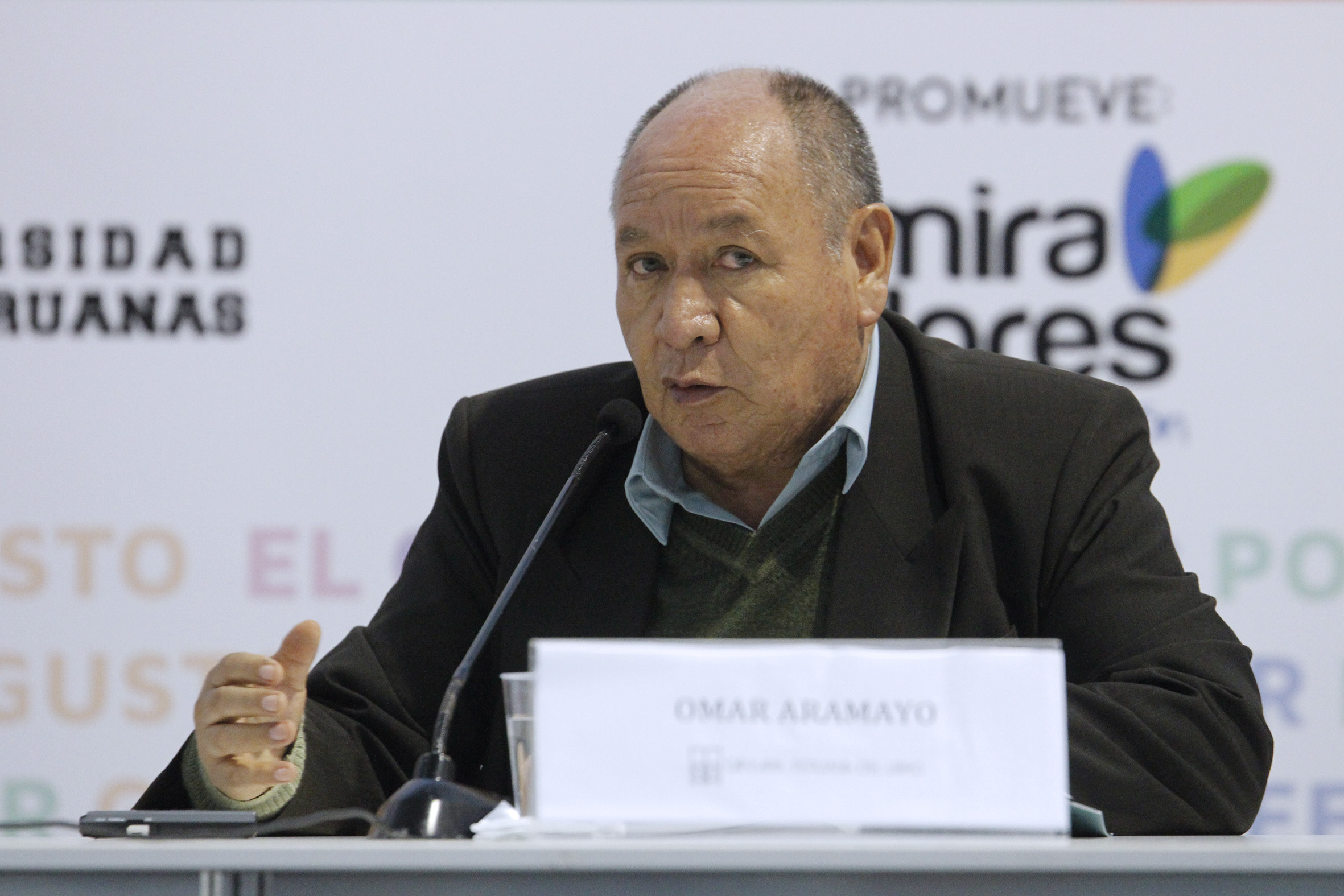
Omar Aramayo in 2015.

Jesús Omar Aramayo Cordero (born June 8, 1947 in Puno) is a Peruvian poet and composer.

== Poetry works ==
- Aleteos al horizonte (1963)
- El llanto de los bolsillos (1964)
- La estela del vacío (1964)
- Antigua canción (1965)
- Malby, el dolor pensativo (1965)
- Lámpara ciega
- Prohibido pisar el grass (1970)
- Axial (1975)
- Poemas de Omar Aramayo (impresos a mimiografo desde 1980)
- Los dioses (1992)
- El sol deja la piel (1992)
- Caleidoscopio (2000)

== Bibliography ==
- La música en el siglo XX de Enrique Pinilla en La música en el Perú, Editorial Patronato Popular y Porvenir Pro Música Clásica, Lima, Perú, 1988.
- Diccionario Histórico y Biográfico del Perú: Siglos XV-XX, 1986, Editorial Milla Batres, Lima, Perú.
- Poesía peruana del 70, César Toro Montalvo, 2004, Colección Perú Lee.
- Enciclopedia Temática del Perú: Literatura, Ricardo Gónzalez Vigil, El Comercio, 2005.
- Antología de la poesía peruana Tomo II, Alberto Escobar, Ediciones Peisa, Lima, Perú, 1973.
