= Guillermo Avila =

Bolivian alpine skier (born 1960)

Personal information
- Nationality: Bolivian
- Born: 28 December 1960 (age 64)

Sport
- Sport: Alpine skiing

Guillermo Avila Paz (born 28 December 1960) is a Bolivian alpine skier. He competed at the 1988 Winter Olympics and the 1992 Winter Olympics.
