= Timo Juhani Grönlund =

Bolivian cross-country skier (born 1987)

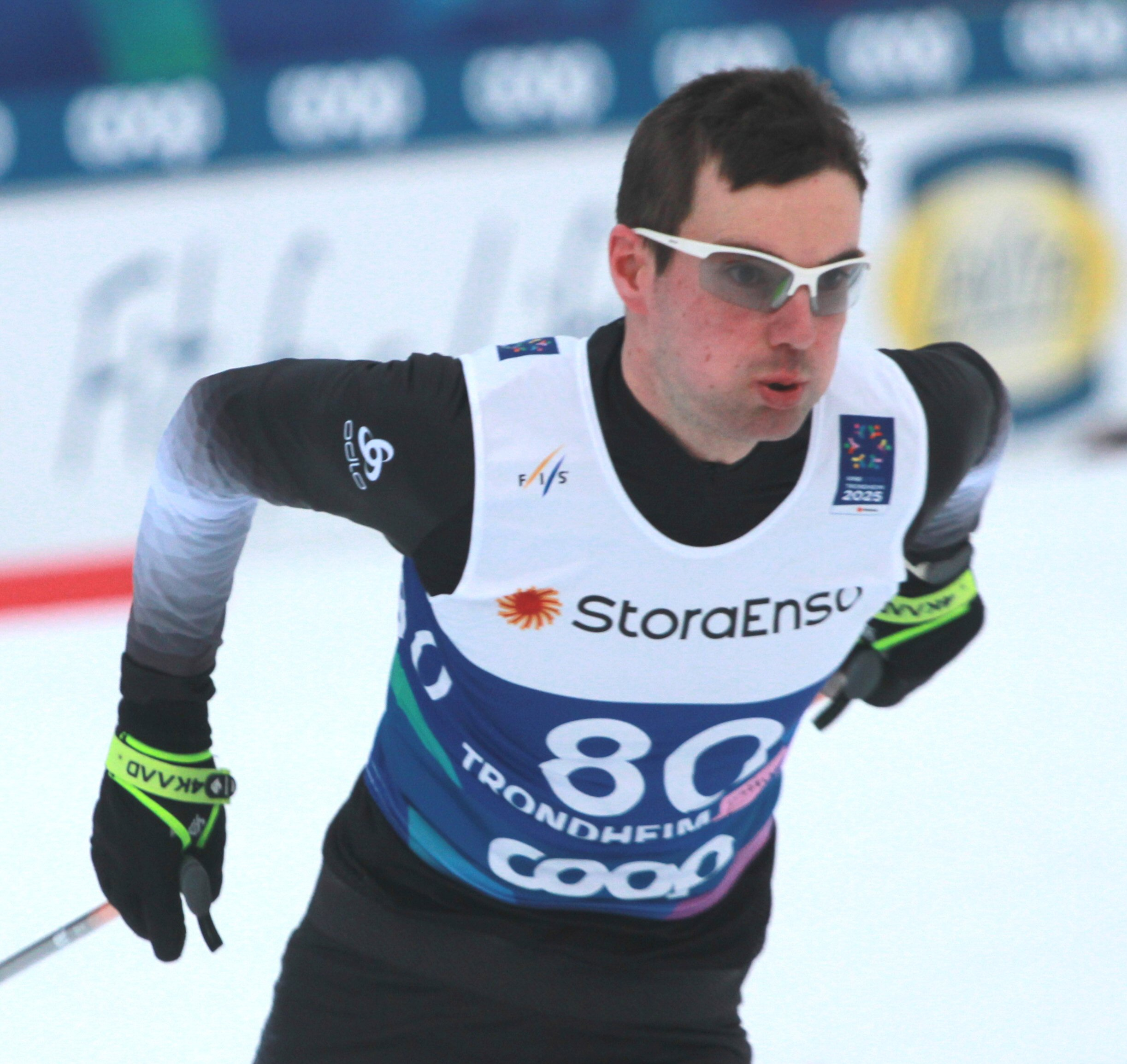
- Grönlund in 2025

Personal information
- Nationality: Bolivian
- Born: 3 July 1987 (age 39) Kitee, Finland

Sport
- Sport: Cross-country skiing

Timo Juhani Grönlund (born 3 July 1987) is a Finnish-Bolivian cross-country skier. He competed in the men's 15 kilometre freestyle at the 2018 Winter Olympics. Grönlund is from Finland, but he has competed internationally for Bolivia since 2017. He qualified to represent Bolivia at the 2022 and 2026 Winter Olympics.

Grönlund married a Bolivian woman in 2011, and moved to La Paz, Bolivia, in 2014.

== Cross-country skiing results ==
All results are sourced from the International Ski Federation (FIS).

=== Olympic Games ===
Year	Age	Individual	Skiathlon	Mass start	Sprint	Relay	Team sprint
2018	30	105	—	—	—	—	—
2022	34	89	—	—	—	—	—
2026	38	82	73	50	93	—	—

=== World Championships ===
Year	Age	15 km individual	30 km skiathlon	50 km mass start	Sprint	4 × 10 km relay	Team sprint
2019	31	—	—	—	129	—	—
2021	33	—	—	—	125	—	—
2023	35	—	—	—	106	—	—
