= José-Manuel Bejarano =

Bolivian alpine skier (born 1956)

Personal information
- Born: 1 April 1956 (age 68); La Paz, Bolivia

Sport
- Sport: Alpine skiing

José-Manuel Bejarano (born 1 April 1956) is a Bolivian alpine skier. He competed at the 1984, 1988 and the 1992 Winter Olympics.
