= Carlos Aramayo (alpine skier) =

Bolivian alpine skier (born 1972)

Personal information
- Nationality: Bolivian
- Born: 16 May 1972 (age 54)

Sport
- Sport: Alpine skiing

Carlos Aramayo (born 16 May 1972) is a Bolivian alpine skier. He competed in the men's giant slalom at the 1992 Winter Olympics.
