= 2022–23 Tour de Ski =

17th edition of the Tour de Ski

Tour de Ski
2022–23 FIS Cross-Country World Cup

Ski tour details
- Venue(s): Val Müstair, Switzerland; Oberstdorf, Germany; Val di Fiemme, Italy
- Dates: 31 December 2022 – 8 January 2023
- Stages: 7

Results
Men
Jersey awarded to the men's overall winner	Winner	Johannes Høsflot Klæbo (NOR)
	Second	Simen Hegstad Krüger (NOR)
	Third	Hans Christer Holund (NOR)
Jersey awarded to the men's points classification winner	Points	Johannes Høsflot Klæbo (NOR)
Women
Jersey awarded to the women's overall winner	Winner	Frida Karlsson (SWE)
	Second	Kerttu Niskanen (FIN)
	Third	Tiril Udnes Weng (NOR)
Jersey awarded to the women's points classification winner	Points	Tiril Udnes Weng (NOR)

The 2022–23 Tour de Ski was the 17th edition of the Tour de Ski and part of the 2022–23 FIS Cross-Country World Cup. The World Cup stage event began in Val Müstair, Switzerland on 31 December 2022 and concluded with the Final Climb stage in Val di Fiemme, Italy, on 8 January 2023. The tour started in Val Müstair for the third time. Johannes Høsflot Klæbo from Norway and Natalya Nepryayeva from Russia were the winners of previous edition. Nepryayeva couldn't defend her title, because of the decision of FIS council, after Russia and Belarus were suspended for this World cup season due to Russian invasion of Ukraine. Klæbo defended the title after winning six stages in a row, while Frida Karlsson from Sweden took the victory on the women's side.

== Schedule ==
Stage	Venue	Date	Event	Technique	Distance		Start time (CET)	
Stage	Venue	Date	Event	Technique	Women	Men	Women	Men
1	Val Müstair (SUI)	31 December 2022	Sprint	Free	1.5 km	1.5 km	14:00	14:00
2	Val Müstair (SUI)	1 January 2023	Distance, pursuit	Classic	10 km	10 km	12:00	13:15
3	Oberstdorf (GER)	3 January 2023	Distance, interval start	Classic	10 km	10 km	14:45	11:45
4	Oberstdorf (GER)	4 January 2023	Distance, pursuit	Free	20 km	20 km	14:30	11:15
5	Val di Fiemme (ITA)	6 January 2023	Sprint	Classic	1.3 km	1.3 km	12:30	12:30
6	Val di Fiemme (ITA)	7 January 2023	Distance, mass start	Classic	15 km	15 km	11:45	13:30
7	Val di Fiemme (ITA)	8 January 2023	Final Climb, mass start	Free	10 km	10 km	11:00	12:45

== Overall leadership ==
Two main individual classifications are contested in the 2022–23 Tour de Ski, as well as a team competition. The most important is the overall standings, calculated by adding each skier's finishing times on each stage. Time bonuses (time subtracted) are awarded at both sprint stages and at intermediate points during mass start stage 6. In the sprint stages, the winners are awarded 60 bonus seconds, while on mass start stage 6, the first ten skiers past the intermediate point receive from 15 seconds to 1 seconds. The skier with the lowest cumulative time is the overall winner of the Tour de Ski. For the fourth time in Tour history, the skier leading the overall standings will wear a yellow bib.

Bonus seconds for the top 30 positions by type
Type		1	2	3	4	5	6	7	8	9	10	11	12	13–15	16–20	21–25	26–30
In finish	Pursuit	none															
In finish	Interval start	none															
In finish	Mass start	none															
In finish	Sprint	60	54	48	46	44	42	32	30	28	26	24	22	10	8	6	4
Intermediate sprint	Mass start (only stage 6)	15	12	10	8	6	5	4	3	2	1	none					

The second competition will be the points standings, which replaced the sprint competition from past editions. The skiers who will receive the highest number of points during the Tour will win the points standings. The points available for each stage finish are determined by the stage's type. The leader will be identified by a red bib.

Points standings points for the top 10 positions by type
Type		1	2	3	4	5	6	7	8	9	10
In finish
In finish	Sprint	30	24	20	16	12	10	8	6	4	2
In finish	Pursuit	30	24	20	16	12	10	8	6	4	2
Intermediate sprint	Interval start (1st IT)	15	12	10	8	6	5	4	3	2	1
Intermediate sprint	Mass start	15	12	10	8	6	5	4	3	2	1

The final competition will be a team competition. This is calculated using the finishing times of the best two skiers of both genders per team on each stage; the leading team is the team with the lowest cumulative time.

Classification leadership by stage
Stage	Men			Women		
Stage	Winner	Overall standings	Points standings	Winner	Overall standings	Points standings
1	Johannes Høsflot Klæbo	Johannes Høsflot Klæbo	Johannes Høsflot Klæbo	Nadine Fähndrich	Nadine Fähndrich	Nadine Fähndrich
2	Johannes Høsflot Klæbo	Johannes Høsflot Klæbo	Johannes Høsflot Klæbo	Tiril Udnes Weng	Tiril Udnes Weng	Tiril Udnes Weng
3	Johannes Høsflot Klæbo	Johannes Høsflot Klæbo	Johannes Høsflot Klæbo	Frida Karlsson	Frida Karlsson	Tiril Udnes Weng
4	Johannes Høsflot Klæbo	Johannes Høsflot Klæbo	Johannes Høsflot Klæbo	Frida Karlsson	Frida Karlsson	Frida Karlsson
5	Johannes Høsflot Klæbo	Johannes Høsflot Klæbo	Johannes Høsflot Klæbo	Lotta Udnes Weng	Frida Karlsson	Tiril Udnes Weng
6	Johannes Høsflot Klæbo	Johannes Høsflot Klæbo	Johannes Høsflot Klæbo	Katharina Hennig	Frida Karlsson	Tiril Udnes Weng
7	Simen Hegstad Krüger	Johannes Høsflot Klæbo	Johannes Høsflot Klæbo	Delphine Claudel	Frida Karlsson	Tiril Udnes Weng
Final		Johannes Høsflot Klæbo	Johannes Høsflot Klæbo	Final	Frida Karlsson	Tiril Udnes Weng

== Final standings ==
Legend
Denotes the winner of the Overall standings	Denotes the winner of the Points standings

=== Overall standings ===
==== Men ====
Final overall standings (1–10)
Rank	Name	Time
1	Johannes Høsflot Klæbo (NOR)	2:44:28.9
2	Simen Hegstad Krüger (NOR)	+59.5
3	Hans Christer Holund (NOR)	+1:21.3
4	Federico Pellegrino (ITA)	+1:44.4
5	Pål Golberg (NOR)	+2:05.3
6	Calle Halfvarsson (SWE)	+2:09.2
7	Sjur Røthe (NOR)	+2:09.9
8	Friedrich Moch (GER)	+2:26.4
9	Didrik Tønseth (NOR)	+2:43.0
10	Jules Lapierre (FRA)	+2:48.5

Final overall standings (11–30)
Rank	Name	Time
11	Michal Novák (CZE)	+3:17.0
12	Hugo Lapalus (FRA)	+3:26.9
13	Ben Ogden (USA)	+3:37.1
14	Francesco De Fabiani (ITA)	+3:41.2
15	Clément Parisse (FRA)	+3:44.7
16	Antoine Cyr (CAN)	+4:03.3
17	Sindre Bjørnestad Skar (NOR)	+4:16.9
18	Perttu Hyvärinen (FIN)	+4:47.8
19	Andrew Musgrave (GBR)	+4:55.1
20	Emil Iversen (NOR)	+4:57.6
21	Håvard Moseby (NOR)	+5:14.4
22	Scott Patterson (USA)	+5:17.7
23	Dominik Bury (POL)	+5:27.2
24	William Poromaa (SWE)	+5:30.9
25	Eric Rosjö (SWE)	+5:35.2
26	Naoto Baba (JPN)	+6:24.2
27	Dietmar Nöckler (ITA)	+6:29.3
28	Hunter Wonders (USA)	+6:40.4
29	Candide Pralong (SUI)	+6:43.5
30	Paolo Ventura (ITA)	+6:50.4

==== Women ====
Final overall standings (1–10)
Rank	Name	Time
1	Frida Karlsson (SWE)	3:09:31.4
2	Kerttu Niskanen (FIN)	+33.2
3	Tiril Udnes Weng (NOR)	+47.6
4	Rosie Brennan (USA)	+1:42.1
5	Katharina Hennig (GER)	+2:13.0
6	Heidi Weng (NOR)	+2:27.2
7	Astrid Øyre Slind (NOR)	+2:52.1
8	Lotta Udnes Weng (NOR)	+3:05.8
9	Teresa Stadlober (AUT)	+3:16.2
10	Delphine Claudel (FRA)	+4:17.0

Final overall standings (11–30)
Rank	Name	Time
11	Jessie Diggins (USA)	+4:36.5
12	Eva Urevc (SLO)	+4:44.2
13	Silje Theodorsen (NOR)	+5:17.8
14	Patrīcija Eiduka (LAT)	+5:20.1
15	Pia Fink (GER)	+5:46.4
16	Laura Gimmler (GER)	+5:53.2
17	Kateřina Razýmová (CZE)	+5:56.8
18	Katherine Stewart-Jones (CAN)	+6:01.8
19	Anne Kyllönen (FIN)	+6:17.1
20	Julia Kern (USA)	+6:20.2
21	Juliette Ducordeau (FRA)	+6:47.9
22	Nadine Fähndrich (SUI)	+6:53.4
23	Sophia Laukli (USA)	+7:08.7
24	Kateřina Janatová (CZE)	+7:35.1
25	Caterina Ganz (ITA)	+7:47.8
26	Margrethe Bergane (NOR)	+8:32.6
27	Masako Ishida (JPN)	+8:35.9
28	Anna Comarella (ITA)	+8:39.2
29	Moa Ilar (SWE)	+9:58.8
30	Anna Dyvik (SWE)	+10:45.1

=== Points standings ===
==== Men ====
Final points standings (1–10)
Rank	Name	Points
1	Johannes Høsflot Klæbo (NOR)	159
2	Sindre Bjørnestad Skar (NOR)	84
3	Calle Halfvarsson (SWE)	84
4	Federico Pellegrino (ITA)	77
5	Pål Golberg (NOR)	50
6	Simen Hegstad Krüger (NOR)	40
7	Michal Novák (CZE)	33
8	Sjur Røthe (NOR)	32
9	Didrik Tønseth (NOR)	24
10	William Poromaa (SWE)	22

==== Women ====
Final points standings (1–10)
Rank	Name	Points
1	Tiril Udnes Weng (NOR)	130
2	Frida Karlsson (SWE)	102
3	Lotta Udnes Weng (NOR)	76
4	Kerttu Niskanen (FIN)	68
5	Katharina Hennig (GER)	45
6	Nadine Fähndrich (SUI)	40
7	Heidi Weng (NOR)	31
8	Jessie Diggins (USA)	26
9	Rosie Brennan (USA)	24
10	Astrid Øyre Slind (NOR)	17

=== Team standings ===
Final team standings (1–5)
Rank	Nation	Time
1	Norway	11:44:03.2
2	Sweden	+13:22.6
3	United States	+15:35.4
4	France	+16:26.7
5	Finland	+18:41.7

== Stages ==
=== Stage 1 ===
31 December 2022, Val Müstair, Switzerland

- Bonus seconds to the 30 skiers that qualifies for the quarter-finals, distributed as following:
  - Final: 60–54–48–46–44–42
  - Semi-final: 32–30–28–26–24–22
  - Quarter-final: 10–10–10–8–8–8–8–8–6–6–6–6–6–4–4–4–4–4

Men – 1.5 km Sprint Free
Rank	Name	QT	Time	BS
1	Johannes Høsflot Klæbo (NOR)	2:54.05 (1)	3:00.98	60
2	Federico Pellegrino (ITA)	2:55.56 (3)	+0.18	54
3	Sindre Bjørnestad Skar (NOR)	2:59.98 (10)	+2.19	48
4	Michal Novák (CZE)	2:56.75 (5)	+3.39	46
5	Richard Jouve (FRA)	3:01.35 (19)	+3.41	44
6	Lucas Chanavat (FRA)	2:55.10 (2)	+28.66	42
7	Janik Riebli (SUI)	2:57.02 (6)	SF	32
8	Pål Golberg (NOR)	3:01.29 (16)	SF	30
9	Valerio Grond (SUI)	2:58.28 (7)	SF	28
10	Renaud Jay (FRA)	2:58.70 (8)	SF	26

Women – 1.5 km Sprint Free
Rank	Name	QT	Time	BS
1	Nadine Fähndrich (SUI)	3:22.59 (1)	3:23.56	60
2	Maja Dahlqvist (SWE)	3:27.77 (13)	+0.47	54
3	Lotta Udnes Weng (NOR)	3:27.75 (12)	+0.62	48
4	Tiril Udnes Weng (NOR)	3:25.00 (2)	+2.35	46
5	Frida Karlsson (SWE)	3:25.58 (5)	+3.39	44
6	Anne Kjersti Kalvå (NOR)	3:25.48 (4)	+7.95	42
7	Kateřina Janatová (CZE)	3:26.30 (7)	SF	32
8	Laura Gimmler (GER)	3:26.49 (8)	SF	30
9	Sofie Krehl (GER)	3:27.11 (9)	SF	28
10	Lena Quintin (FRA)	3:32.01 (26)	SF	26

=== Stage 2 ===
1 January 2023, Val Müstair, Switzerland

- No bonus seconds are awarded on this stage.

Men – 10 km Pursuit Classic
Rank	Name	Time
1	Johannes Høsflot Klæbo (NOR)	25:55.0
2	Pål Golberg (NOR)	+10.2
3	Federico Pellegrino (ITA)	+10.2
4	Simen Hegstad Krüger (NOR)	+28.0
5	Sindre Bjørnestad Skar (NOR)	+29.6
6	Martin Løwstrøm Nyenget (NOR)	+33.4
7	William Poromaa (SWE)	+33.8
8	Michal Novák (CZE)	+34.1
9	Hans Christer Holund (NOR)	+34.7
10	Didrik Tønseth (NOR)	+35.2

Women – 10 km Pursuit Classic
Rank	Name	Time
1	Tiril Udnes Weng (NOR)	28:51.3
2	Kerttu Niskanen (FIN)	+0.4
3	Frida Karlsson (SWE)	+0.6
4	Anne Kjersti Kalvå (NOR)	+1.9
5	Lotta Udnes Weng (NOR)	+21.8
6	Katharina Hennig (GER)	+41.9
7	Rosie Brennan (USA)	+44.9
8	Heidi Weng (NOR)	+1:03.3
9	Nadine Fähndrich (SUI)	+1:03.5
10	Astrid Øyre Slind (NOR)	+1.03.9

=== Stage 3 ===
3 January 2023, Oberstdorf, Germany

- No bonus seconds are awarded on this stage.

Men – 10 km Individual Classic
Rank	Name	Time
1	Johannes Høsflot Klæbo (NOR)	21:38.5
2	Simen Hegstad Krüger (NOR)	+12.4
3	Didrik Tønseth (NOR)	+22.4
4	Calle Halfvarsson (SWE)	+24.9
5	Pål Golberg (NOR)	+26.9
6	Ben Ogden (USA)	+30.0
7	Andrew Musgrave (GBR)	+38.9
8	Håvard Moseby (NOR)	+42.6
9	Francesco De Fabiani (ITA)	+42.8
10	Hans Christer Holund (NOR)	+43.2

Women – 10 km Individual Classic
Rank	Name	Time
1	Frida Karlsson (SWE)	24:53.3
2	Krista Pärmäkoski (FIN)	+16.6
3	Anne Kjersti Kalvå (NOR)	+18.1
4	Tiril Udnes Weng (NOR)	+20.0
5	Kerttu Niskanen (FIN)	+40.7
6	Katharina Hennig (GER)	+41.2
7	Teresa Stadlober (AUT)	+43.4
8	Silje Theodorsen (NOR)	+46.9
9	Eva Urevc (SLO)	+51.5
10	Heidi Weng (NOR)	+55.9

=== Stage 4 ===
4 January 2023, Oberstdorf, Germany

- Pursuit start lists are based only on Stage 3 results. In fact, stage 4 finish differences are cumulative results of stages 3 and 4.
- No bonus seconds are awarded on this stage.

Men – 20 km Pursuit Free
Rank	Name	Time
1	Johannes Høsflot Klæbo (NOR)	41:35.8
2	Sindre Bjørnestad Skar (NOR)	+1.8
3	Federico Pellegrino (ITA)	+2.1
4	Calle Halfvarsson (SWE)	+2.9
5	Sjur Røthe (NOR)	+3.4
6	Pål Golberg (NOR)	+3.5
7	William Poromaa (SWE)	+4.0
8	Simen Hegstad Krüger (NOR)	+4.0
9	Didrik Tønseth (NOR)	+4.3
10	Emil Iversen (NOR)	+4.5

Women – 20 km Pursuit Free
Rank	Name	Time
1	Frida Karlsson (SWE)	48:02.6
2	Krista Pärmäkoski (FIN)	+14.1
3	Tiril Udnes Weng (NOR)	+1:28.0
4	Anne Kjersti Kalvå (NOR)	+1:29.3
5	Patrīcija Eiduka (LAT)	+1:46.1
6	Teresa Stadlober (AUT)	+1:46.2
7	Eva Urevc (SLO)	+1:47.1
8	Jessie Diggins (USA)	+1:47.4
9	Katharina Hennig (GER)	+1:49.1
10	Heidi Weng (NOR)	+1:49.3

=== Stage 5 ===
6 January 2023, Val di Fiemme, Italy

- Bonus seconds to the 30 skiers that qualifies for the quarter-finals, distributed as following:
  - Final: 60–54–48–46–44–42
  - Semi-final: 32–30–28–26–24–22
  - Quarter-final: 10–10–10–8–8–8–8–8–6–6–6–6–6–4–4–4–4–4

Men – 1.3 km Sprint Classic
Rank	Name	QT	Time	BS
1	Johannes Høsflot Klæbo (NOR)	2:37.53 (1)	2:43.85	60
2	Calle Halfvarsson (SWE)	2:40.47 (2)	+0.26	54
3	Simone Mocellini (ITA)	2:42.67 (7)	+0.94	48
4	Lucas Chanavat (FRA)	2:41.60 (4)	+1.23	46
5	Johan Häggström (SWE)	2:46.07 (19)	+1.41	44
6	Antoine Cyr (CAN)	2:45.82 (17)	+2.99	42
7	JC Schoonmaker (USA)	2:41.91 (5)	SF	32
8	Renaud Jay (FRA)	2:42.92 (8)	SF	30
9	Ben Ogden (USA)	2:40.91 (3)	SF	28
10	Emil Iversen (NOR)	2:45.30 (16)	SF	26

Women – 1.3 km Sprint Classic
Rank	Name	QT	Time	BS
1	Lotta Udnes Weng (NOR)	3:06.18 (9)	3:06.04	60
2	Tiril Udnes Weng (NOR)	3:03.56 (2)	+0.35	54
3	Mathilde Myhrvold (NOR)	3:06.25 (10)	+0.67	48
4	Katharina Hennig (GER)	3:03.60 (3)	+0.83	46
5	Krista Pärmäkoski (FIN)	3:04.28 (4)	+1.29	44
6	Tereza Beranová (CZE)	3:05.99 (8)	+2.55	42
7	Kerttu Niskanen (FIN)	3:05.64 (7)	SF	32
8	Anna Dyvik (SWE)	3:07.36 (12)	SF	30
9	Astrid Øyre Slind (NOR)	3:06.50 (11)	SF	28
10	Rosie Brennan (USA)	3:07.40 (13)	SF	26

=== Stage 6 ===
7 January 2023, Val di Fiemme, Italy

Men – 15 km Mass Start Classic
Rank	Name	Time	BS
1	Johannes Høsflot Klæbo (NOR)	39:59.2	15
2	Pål Golberg (NOR)	+0.4	10
3	Francesco de Fabiani (ITA)	+1.2	3
4	Antoine Cyr (CAN)	+1.3	
5	Calle Halfvarsson (SWE)	+1.6	12
6	William Poromaa (SWE)	+1.9	1
7	Simen Hegstad Krüger (NOR)	+2.1	5
8	Didrik Tønseth (NOR)	+3.1	
9	Hans Christer Holund (NOR)	+3.6	8
10	Federico Pellegrino (ITA)	+4.7	

Women – 15 km Mass Start Classic
Rank	Name	Time	BS
1	Katharina Hennig (GER)	44:26.7	6
2	Frida Karlsson (SWE)	+0.7	15
3	Kerttu Niskanen (FIN)	+0.8	10
4	Rosie Brennan (USA)	+1.0	8
5	Teresa Stadlober (AUT)	+10.9	5
6	Astrid Øyre Slind (NOR)	+17.3	4
7	Tiril Udnes Weng (NOR)	+29.2	12
8	Anne Kyllönen (FIN)	+34.4	1
9	Heidi Weng (NOR)	+34.7	
10	Katherine Stewart-Jones (CAN)	+36.2	2

==== Stage 6 bonus seconds ====
- Men: 1 intermediate sprint, bonus seconds to the 10 first skiers (15–12–10–8–6–5–4–3–2–1) past the intermediate point.
- Women: 1 intermediate sprint, bonus seconds to the 10 first skiers (15–12–10–8–6–5–4–3–2–1) past the intermediate point.
- No bonus seconds are awarded at the finish

Bonus seconds (Stage 6 – Men)
Name	Point 1
Johannes Høsflot Klæbo (NOR)	15
Calle Halfvarsson (SWE)	12
Pål Golberg (NOR)	10
Hans Christer Holund (NOR)	8
Michal Novák (CZE)	6
Simen Hegstad Krüger (NOR)	5
Friedrich Moch (GER)	4
Francesco de Fabiani (ITA)	3
Andrew Musgrave (GBR)	2
William Poromaa (SWE)	1

Bonus seconds (Stage 6 – Women)
Name	Point 1
Frida Karlsson (SWE)	15
Tiril Udnes Weng (NOR)	12
Kerttu Niskanen (FIN)	10
Rosie Brennan (USA)	8
Katharina Hennig (GER)	6
Teresa Stadlober (AUT)	5
Astrid Øyre Slind (NOR)	4
Delphine Claudel (FRA)	3
Katherine Stewart-Jones (CAN)	2
Anne Kyllönen (FIN)	1

=== Stage 7 ===
8 January 2023, Val di Fiemme, Italy

No bonus seconds are awarded on this stage.

Men – 10 km Final Climb Mass Start Free
Rank	Name	Time
1	Simen Hegstad Krüger (NOR)	31:20.4
2	Hans Christer Holund (NOR)	+4.8
3	Jules Lapierre (FRA)	+25.0
4	Sjur Røthe (NOR)	+27.4
5	Friedrich Moch (GER)	+38.9
6	Johannes Høsflot Klæbo (NOR)	+45.5
7	Hugo Lapalus (FRA)	+56.4
8	Federico Pellegrino (ITA)	+1:02.9
9	Irineu Esteve Altimiras (AND)	+1:04.1
10	Clément Parisse (FRA)	+1:08.2

Women – 10 km Final Climb Mass Start Free
Rank	Name	Time
1	Delphine Claudel (FRA)	36:35.4
2	Heidi Weng (NOR)	+20.2
3	Sophia Laukli (USA)	+35.7
4	Kerttu Niskanen (FIN)	+36.2
5	Jessie Diggins (USA)	+53.5
6	Rosie Brennan (USA)	+54.1
7	Teresa Stadlober (AUT)	+1:05.2
8	Margrethe Bergane (NOR)	+1:12.6
9	Eva Urevc (SLO)	+1:14.2
10	Tiril Udnes Weng (NOR)	+1:15.6

== World Cup points distribution ==
The table shows the number of 2022–23 FIS Cross-Country World Cup points to win in the 2022–23 Tour de Ski for men and women.

Place	1	2	3	4	5	6	7	8	9	10	11	12	13	14	15	16	17	18	19	20	21	22	23	24	25	26	27	28	29	30	31	32	33	34	35	36	37	38	39	40	41	42	43	44	45	46	47	48	49	50
Overall Standings	300	285	270	255	240	225	216	207	198	189	180	174	168	162	156	150	144	138	132	126	120	114	108	102	96	90	84	78	72	66	60	57	54	51	48	45	42	39	36	33	30	27	24	21	18	15	12	9	6	3
Each Stage	50	47	44	41	38	35	32	30	28	26	24	22	20	18	16	15	14	13	12	11	10	9	8	7	6	5	4	3	2	1

== Sources ==
- Rules for the FIS Cross-Country World Cup (PDF). International Ski Federation (FIS). 2022. Archived from the original (PDF) on 2 December 2022.
- FIS CROSS-COUNTRY WORLD CUP 2022/23 (PDF). International Ski Federation (FIS). 2022.
