= List of FIS Cross-Country World Cup champions =

The tables below list the FIS Cross-Country World Cup champions. The medalists are the three contestants with the highest total scores at the end of the cross-country skiing World Cup season. The list extends from 1973–74 onwards for overall men, 1978–79 onwards for overall women, 1996–97 onwards for sprint and distance (both genders), as well as Nations Cup winners beginning for 1981–82.

== Men ==
=== Overall ===
Season	Winner	Runner-up	Third
1973–74¹	(Norway) Ivar Formo	(Finland) Juha Mieto	(Switzerland) Eduard Hauser
1974–75¹	(Norway) Oddvar Brå	(Norway) Odd Martinsen	(Finland) Juha Mieto
1975–76¹	(Finland) Juha Mieto	(Finland) Arto Koivisto	(Norway) Ivar Formo
1976–77¹	(Sweden) Thomas Wassberg	(Finland) Juha Mieto (2)	(Sweden) Thomas Magnusson
1977–78¹	(Sweden) Sven-Åke Lundbäck	(Norway) Lars-Erik Eriksen	(Norway) Magne Myrmo
1978–79²	(Norway) Oddvar Brå (2)	(Norway) Lars-Erik Eriksen (2)	(Sweden) Sven-Åke Lundbäck
1979–80¹	(Finland) Juha Mieto (2)	(Sweden) Thomas Wassberg	(Norway) Lars-Erik Eriksen
1980–81²	(Soviet Union) Alexander Zavyalov	(Norway) Oddvar Brå	(Norway) Ove Aunli
Official World Cup
1981–82	(United States) Bill Koch	(Sweden) Thomas Wassberg	(Finland) Harri Kirvesniemi
1982–83	(Soviet Union) Alexander Zavyalov (2)	(Sweden) Gunde Svan	(United States) Bill Koch
1983–84	(Sweden) Gunde Svan	(Sweden) Thomas Wassberg	(Finland) Harri Kirvesniemi (2)
1984–85	(Sweden) Gunde Svan	(Norway) Tor Håkon Holte	(Norway) Ove Aunli (2)
1985–86	(Sweden) Gunde Svan	(Sweden) Torgny Mogren	(Soviet Union) Vladimir Smirnov
1986–87	(Sweden) Torgny Mogren	(Sweden) Thomas Wassberg (4)	(Sweden) Gunde Svan
1987–88	(Sweden) Gunde Svan	(Sweden) Torgny Mogren	(Norway) Pål Gunnar Mikkelsplass
1988–89	(Sweden) Gunde Svan (5)	(Norway) Vegard Ulvang	(Sweden) Torgny Mogren
1989–90	(Norway) Vegard Ulvang	(Sweden) Gunde Svan (2)	(Norway) Bjørn Dæhlie
1990–91	(Soviet Union) Vladimir Smirnov	(Sweden) Torgny Mogren (3)	(Norway) Bjørn Dæhlie (2)
1991–92	(Norway) Bjørn Dæhlie	(Norway) Vegard Ulvang (2)	(Commonwealth of Independent States) Vladimir Smirnov
1992–93	(Norway) Bjørn Dæhlie	(Kazakhstan) Vladimir Smirnov	(Norway) Vegard Ulvang
1993–94	(Kazakhstan) Vladimir Smirnov (2)	(Norway) Bjørn Dæhlie	(Finland) Jari Isometsä
1994–95	(Norway) Bjørn Dæhlie	(Kazakhstan) Vladimir Smirnov	(Italy) Silvio Fauner
1995–96	(Norway) Bjørn Dæhlie	(Kazakhstan) Vladimir Smirnov (3)	(Finland) Jari Isometsä (2)
1996–97	(Norway) Bjørn Dæhlie	(Finland) Mika Myllylä	(Italy) Fulvio Valbusa
1997–98	(Norway) Thomas Alsgaard	(Norway) Bjørn Dæhlie (2)	(Kazakhstan) Vladimir Smirnov (3)
1998–99	(Norway) Bjørn Dæhlie (6)	(Austria) Mikhail Botwinov	(Finland) Mika Myllylä
1999–00	(Spain) Johann Mühlegg	(Finland) Jari Isometsä	(Norway) Odd-Bjørn Hjelmeset
2000–01	(Sweden) Per Elofsson	(Spain) Johann Mühlegg	(Norway) Thomas Alsgaard
2001–02	(Sweden) Per Elofsson (2)	(Norway) Thomas Alsgaard	(Norway) Anders Aukland
2002–03	(Sweden) Mathias Fredriksson	(Germany) René Sommerfeldt	(Sweden) Jörgen Brink
2003–04	(Germany) René Sommerfeldt	(Sweden) Mathias Fredriksson	(Norway) Jens Arne Svartedal
2004–05	(Germany) Axel Teichmann	(France) Vincent Vittoz	(Norway) Tor Arne Hetland
2005–06	(Germany) Tobias Angerer	(Norway) Jens Arne Svartedal	(Norway) Tor Arne Hetland (2)
2006–07	(Germany) Tobias Angerer (2)	(Russia) Alexander Legkov	(Norway) Eldar Rønning
2007–08	(Czech Republic) Lukáš Bauer	(Germany) René Sommerfeldt (2)	(Italy) Pietro Piller Cottrer
2008–09	(Switzerland) Dario Cologna	(Norway) Petter Northug	(Norway) Ola Vigen Hattestad
2009–10	(Norway) Petter Northug	(Czech Republic) Lukáš Bauer	(Sweden) Marcus Hellner
2010–11	(Switzerland) Dario Cologna	(Norway) Petter Northug	(Sweden) Daniel Richardsson
2011–12	(Switzerland) Dario Cologna	(Canada) Devon Kershaw	(Norway) Petter Northug
2012–13	(Norway) Petter Northug (2)	(Russia) Alexander Legkov	(Switzerland) Dario Cologna
2013–14	(Norway) Martin Johnsrud Sundby	(Russia) Alexander Legkov (3)	(Canada) Alex Harvey
2014–15	(Switzerland) Dario Cologna (4)	(Norway) Petter Northug	(Sweden) Calle Halfvarsson
2015–16	(Norway) Martin Johnsrud Sundby	(Norway) Petter Northug (4)	(Norway) Finn Hågen Krogh
2016–17	(Norway) Martin Johnsrud Sundby (3)	(Russia) Sergey Ustiugov	(Canada) Alex Harvey (2)
2017–18	(Norway) Johannes Høsflot Klæbo	(Switzerland) Dario Cologna	(Norway) Martin Johnsrud Sundby
2018–19	(Norway) Johannes Høsflot Klæbo	(Russia) Alexander Bolshunov	(Norway) Sjur Røthe
2019–20	(Russia) Alexander Bolshunov	(Norway) Johannes Høsflot Klæbo	(Norway) Pål Golberg
2020–21	(Russia) Alexander Bolshunov (2)	(Russia) Ivan Yakimushkin	(Norway) Johannes Høsflot Klæbo
2021–22	(Norway) Johannes Høsflot Klæbo	(Russia) Alexander Bolshunov (2)	(Finland) Iivo Niskanen
2022–23	(Norway) Johannes Høsflot Klæbo	(Norway) Pål Golberg	(Italy) Federico Pellegrino
2023–24	(Norway) Harald Østberg Amundsen	(Norway) Johannes Høsflot Klæbo (2)	(Norway) Erik Valnes
2024–25	(Norway) Johannes Høsflot Klæbo (5)	(Sweden) Edvin Anger	(Norway) Erik Valnes (2)

^{1} Unofficial WC
^{2} Trial WC

- Medals:

Rank	Nation	Gold	Silver	Bronze	Total
1	Norway (NOR)	22	18	25	65
2	Sweden (SWE)	11	11	8	30
3	Germany (GER)	4	2	0	6
4	Switzerland (SUI)	4	1	2	7
5	Soviet Union (URS)	3	0	1	4
6	Russia (RUS)	2	7	0	9
7	Finland (FIN)	2	5	7	14
8	Kazakhstan (KAZ)	1	3	1	5
9	Czech Republic (CZE)	1	1	0	2
9	Spain (ESP)	1	1	0	2
11	United States (USA)	1	0	1	2
12	Canada (CAN)	0	1	2	3
13	Austria (AUT)	0	1	0	1
13	France (FRA)	0	1	0	1
15	Italy (ITA)	0	0	4	4
16	CIS (CIS)	0	0	1	1
Totals (16 entries)		52	52	52	156

=== Sprint ===
Season	Winner	Runner-up	Third
1996–97	(Norway) Bjørn Dæhlie	(Italy) Fulvio Valbusa	(Italy) Silvio Fauner
1997–98	(Norway) Thomas Alsgaard	(Norway) Bjørn Dæhlie	(Kazakhstan) Vladimir Smirnov
1998–99	(Norway) Bjørn Dæhlie (2)	(Norway) Odd-Bjørn Hjelmeset	(Sweden) Mathias Fredriksson
1999–00	(Norway) Morten Brørs	(Norway) Odd-Bjørn Hjelmeset (2)	(Norway) Håvard Solbakken
2000–01	(Norway) Jan Jacob Verdenius	(Italy) Cristian Zorzi	(Norway) Tor Arne Hetland
2001–02	(Norway) Trond Iversen	(Norway) Jens Arne Svartedal	(Italy) Cristian Zorzi
2002–03	(Sweden) Thobias Fredriksson	(Norway) Tor Arne Hetland	(Finland) Lauri Pyykönen
2003–04	(Sweden) Thobias Fredriksson (2)	(Norway) Jens Arne Svartedal (2)	(Norway) Håvard Bjerkeli
2004–05	(Norway) Tor Arne Hetland	(Norway) Eldar Rønning	(Norway) Trond Iversen
2005–06	(Sweden) Björn Lind	(Sweden) Thobias Fredriksson	(Norway) Tor Arne Hetland
2006–07	(Norway) Jens Arne Svartedal	(Norway) Trond Iversen	(Sweden) Emil Jönsson
2007–08	(Norway) Ola Vigen Hattestad	(Sweden) Emil Jönsson	(Norway) John Kristian Dahl
2008–09	(Norway) Ola Vigen Hattestad	(Italy) Renato Pasini	(Norway) Tor Arne Hetland (3)
2009–10	(Sweden) Emil Jönsson	(Norway) Petter Northug	(Russia) Alexei Petukhov
2010–11	(Sweden) Emil Jönsson	(Norway) Ola Vigen Hattestad	(Sweden) Jesper Modin
2011–12	(Sweden) Teodor Peterson	(Russia) Nikolay Morilov	(Norway) Eirik Brandsdal
2012–13	(Sweden) Emil Jönsson (3)	(Norway) Petter Northug	(Russia) Nikita Kryukov
2013–14	(Norway) Ola Vigen Hattestad (3)	(Norway) Eirik Brandsdal	(Germany) Josef Wenzl
2014–15	(Norway) Finn Hågen Krogh	(Norway) Eirik Brandsdal (2)	(Italy) Federico Pellegrino
2015–16	(Italy) Federico Pellegrino	(Norway) Petter Northug (3)	(Norway) Finn Hågen Krogh
2016–17	(Norway) Johannes Høsflot Klæbo	(Italy) Federico Pellegrino	(Norway) Sindre Bjørnestad Skar
2017–18	(Norway) Johannes Høsflot Klæbo	(Italy) Federico Pellegrino	(France) Lucas Chanavat
2018–19	(Norway) Johannes Høsflot Klæbo	(Italy) Federico Pellegrino (3)	(Norway) Eirik Brandsdal (2)
2019–20	(Norway) Johannes Høsflot Klæbo	(Norway) Erik Valnes	(Norway) Pål Golberg
2020–21	(Italy) Federico Pellegrino (2)	(Russia) Gleb Retivykh	(Russia) Alexander Bolshunov
2021–22	(France) Richard Jouve	(Norway) Johannes Høsflot Klæbo	(France) Lucas Chanavat
2022–23	(Norway) Johannes Høsflot Klæbo	(France) Lucas Chanavat	(Norway) Even Northug
2023–24	(Norway) Johannes Høsflot Klæbo	(Norway) Erik Valnes	(France) Lucas Chanavat (3)
2024–25	(Norway) Johannes Høsflot Klæbo (7)	(Norway) Erik Valnes (3)	(Sweden) Edvin Anger

- Medals:

Rank	Nation	Gold	Silver	Bronze	Total
1	Norway (NOR)	19	18	13	50
2	Sweden (SWE)	7	2	4	13
3	Italy (ITA)	2	6	3	11
4	France (FRA)	1	1	3	5
5	Russia (RUS)	0	2	3	5
6	Finland (FIN)	0	0	1	1
6	Germany (GER)	0	0	1	1
6	Kazakhstan (KAZ)	0	0	1	1
Totals (8 entries)		29	29	29	87

=== Distance ===
Season	Winner	Runner-up	Third
1996–97¹	(Finland) Mika Myllylä	(Norway) Bjørn Dæhlie	(Kazakhstan) Vladimir Smirnov
1997–98¹	(Norway) Thomas Alsgaard	(Norway) Bjørn Dæhlie	(Finland) Mika Myllylä
1998–99¹	(Austria) Mikhail Botwinov	(Norway) Bjørn Dæhlie (3)	(Finland) Mika Myllylä (2)
1999–00	not arranged		
2000–01	not arranged		
2001–02	not arranged		
2002–03	not arranged		
2003–04	(Germany) René Sommerfeldt	(Sweden) Mathias Fredriksson	(Norway) Frode Estil
2004–05	(Germany) Axel Teichmann	(France) Vincent Vittoz	(Germany) Tobias Angerer
2005–06	(Germany) Tobias Angerer	(France) Vincent Vittoz	(Sweden) Anders Södergren
2006–07	(Germany) Tobias Angerer (2)	(France) Vincent Vittoz (3)	(Norway) Odd-Bjørn Hjelmeset
2007–08	(Czech Republic) Lukáš Bauer	(Italy) Pietro Piller Cottrer	(Germany) René Sommerfeldt
2008–09	(Italy) Pietro Piller Cottrer	(Switzerland) Dario Cologna	(Norway) Petter Northug
2009–10	(Norway) Petter Northug	(Czech Republic) Lukáš Bauer	(Sweden) Marcus Hellner
2010–11	(Switzerland) Dario Cologna	(Sweden) Daniel Richardsson	(Czech Republic) Lukáš Bauer
2011–12	(Switzerland) Dario Cologna	(Canada) Devon Kershaw	(Russia) Alexander Legkov
2012–13	(Russia) Alexander Legkov	(Switzerland) Dario Cologna (2)	(Norway) Petter Northug (2)
2013–14	(Norway) Martin Johnsrud Sundby	(Russia) Alexander Legkov	(Sweden) Daniel Richardsson
2014–15	(Switzerland) Dario Cologna	(Norway) Martin Johnsrud Sundby	(Russia) Evgeniy Belov
2015–16	(Norway) Martin Johnsrud Sundby	(France) Maurice Manificat	(Norway) Niklas Dyrhaug
2016–17	(Norway) Martin Johnsrud Sundby (3)	(Canada) Alex Harvey	(Finland) Matti Heikkinen
2017–18	(Switzerland) Dario Cologna (4)	(Norway) Martin Johnsrud Sundby (2)	(Norway) Hans Christer Holund
2018–19	(Russia) Alexander Bolshunov	(Norway) Sjur Røthe	(Norway) Martin Johnsrud Sundby
2019–20	(Russia) Alexander Bolshunov	(Norway) Sjur Røthe (2)	(Finland) Iivo Niskanen
2020–21	(Russia) Alexander Bolshunov (3)	(Russia) Ivan Yakimushkin	(Norway) Simen Hegstad Krüger
2021–22	(Finland) Iivo Niskanen	(Russia) Alexander Bolshunov	(Norway) Johannes Høsflot Klæbo
2022–23	(Norway) Pål Golberg	(Norway) Johannes Høsflot Klæbo	(Norway) Didrik Tønseth
2023–24	(Norway) Harald Østberg Amundsen	(Norway) Johannes Høsflot Klæbo (2)	(Norway) Pål Golberg
2024–25	(Norway) Simen Hegstad Krüger	(Norway) Martin Løwstrøm Nyenget	(France) Hugo Lapalus

¹ arranged under the name of "Long Distance World Cup"

- Medals:

Rank	Nation	Gold	Silver	Bronze	Total
1	Norway (NOR)	8	10	11	29
2	Russia (RUS)	4	3	2	9
3	Switzerland (SUI)	4	2	0	6
4	Germany (GER)	4	0	2	6
5	Finland (FIN)	2	0	4	6
6	Czech Republic (CZE)	1	1	1	3
7	Italy (ITA)	1	1	0	2
8	Austria (AUT)	1	0	0	1
9	France (FRA)	0	4	1	5
10	Sweden (SWE)	0	2	3	5
11	Canada (CAN)	0	2	0	2
12	Kazakhstan (KAZ)	0	0	1	1
Totals (12 entries)		25	25	25	75

== Women ==
See the List of IOC country codes for expansions of country abbreviations.

=== Overall ===
Season	Winner	Runner-up	Third
1978–79¹	(Soviet Union) Galina Kulakova	(Soviet Union) Raisa Smetanina	(Soviet Union) Zinaida Amosova
1979–80	No World Cup arranged this season		
1980–81¹	(Soviet Union) Raisa Smetanina	(Norway) Berit Aunli	(Czechoslovakia) Květoslava Jeriová-Pecková
Official World Cup
1981–82	(Norway) Berit Aunli	(Norway) Britt Pettersen	(Czechoslovakia) Květoslava Jeriová-Pecková
1982–83	(Finland) Marja-Liisa Kirvesniemi	(Norway) Britt Pettersen (2)	(Czechoslovakia) Květoslava Jeriová-Pecková (3)
1983–84	(Finland) Marja-Liisa Kirvesniemi (2)	(Soviet Union) Raisa Smetanina (2)	(Norway) Anne Jahren
1984–85	(Norway) Anette Bøe	(Norway) Grete Ingeborg Nykkelmo	(Norway) Britt Pettersen
1985–86	(Finland) Marjo Matikainen	(Norway) Marianne Dahlmo	(Norway) Britt Pettersen (2)
1986–87	(Finland) Marjo Matikainen	(Soviet Union) Anfisa Reztsova	(Norway) Marianne Dahlmo
1987–88	(Finland) Marjo Matikainen (3)	(Sweden) Marie-Helene Westin	(Finland) Marja-Liisa Kirvesniemi ²
1988–89	(Soviet Union) Yelena Välbe	(Czechoslovakia) Alžběta Havrančíková	(Soviet Union) Tamara Tikhonova
1989–90	(Soviet Union) Larisa Lazutina	(Soviet Union) Yelena Välbe	(Norway) Trude Dybendahl
1990–91	(Soviet Union) Yelena Välbe	(Italy) Stefania Belmondo	(Soviet Union) Lyubov Yegorova
1991–92	(Commonwealth of Independent States) Yelena Välbe	(Italy) Stefania Belmondo	(Commonwealth of Independent States) Lyubov Yegorova (2)
1992–93	(Russia) Lyubov Yegorova	(Russia) Yelena Välbe	(Italy) Stefania Belmondo
1993–94	(Italy) Manuela Di Centa	(Russia) Lyubov Yegorova	(Russia) Yelena Välbe
1994–95	(Russia) Yelena Välbe	(Russia) Nina Gavrilyuk	(Russia) Larisa Lazutina
1995–96	(Italy) Manuela Di Centa (2)	(Russia) Yelena Välbe (3)	(Russia) Larisa Lazutina
1996–97	(Russia) Yelena Välbe (5)	(Italy) Stefania Belmondo	(Czech Republic) Kateřina Neumannová
1997–98	(Russia) Larisa Lazutina (2)	(Norway) Bente Martinsen	(Italy) Stefania Belmondo
1998–99	(Norway) Bente Martinsen	(Italy) Stefania Belmondo (4)	(Russia) Nina Gavrilyuk
1999–00	(Norway) Bente Martinsen	(Estonia) Kristina Šmigun	(Russia) Larisa Lazutina
2000–01	(Russia) Yuliya Chepalova	(Norway) Bente Skari ³ (2)	(Russia) Larisa Lazutina (4)
2001–02	(Norway) Bente Skari ³	(Czech Republic) Kateřina Neumannová	(Italy) Stefania Belmondo (3)
2002–03	(Norway) Bente Skari ³ (4)	(Estonia) Kristina Šmigun (2)	(Italy) Gabriella Paruzzi
2003–04	(Italy) Gabriella Paruzzi	(Norway) Marit Bjørgen	(Ukraine) Valentyna Shevchenko
2004–05	(Norway) Marit Bjørgen	(Czech Republic) Kateřina Neumannová (2)	(Finland) Virpi Kuitunen
2005–06	(Norway) Marit Bjørgen	(Canada) Beckie Scott	(Russia) Yuliya Chepalova
2006–07	(Finland) Virpi Kuitunen	(Norway) Marit Bjørgen	(Czech Republic) Kateřina Neumannová (2)
2007–08	(Finland) Virpi Kuitunen (2)	(Norway) Astrid Uhrenholdt Jacobsen	(Poland) Justyna Kowalczyk
2008–09	(Poland) Justyna Kowalczyk	(Slovenia) Petra Majdič	(Finland) Aino-Kaisa Saarinen
2009–10	(Poland) Justyna Kowalczyk	(Norway) Marit Bjørgen	(Slovenia) Petra Majdič
2010–11	(Poland) Justyna Kowalczyk	(Norway) Marit Bjørgen	(Italy) Arianna Follis
2011–12	(Norway) Marit Bjørgen	(Poland) Justyna Kowalczyk	(Norway) Therese Johaug
2012–13	(Poland) Justyna Kowalczyk (4)	(Norway) Therese Johaug	(United States) Kikkan Randall
2013–14	(Norway) Therese Johaug	(Norway) Marit Bjørgen (5)	(Norway) Astrid Uhrenholdt Jacobsen
2014–15	(Norway) Marit Bjørgen (4)	(Norway) Therese Johaug (2)	(Norway) Heidi Weng
2015–16	(Norway) Therese Johaug	(Norway) Ingvild Flugstad Østberg	(Norway) Heidi Weng (2)
2016–17	(Norway) Heidi Weng	(Finland) Krista Pärmäkoski	(Norway) Ingvild Flugstad Østberg
2017–18	(Norway) Heidi Weng (2)	(United States) Jessie Diggins	(Norway) Ingvild Flugstad Østberg (2)
2018–19	(Norway) Ingvild Flugstad Østberg	(Russia) Natalya Nepryayeva	(Norway) Therese Johaug (2)
2019–20	(Norway) Therese Johaug (3)	(Norway) Heidi Weng	(Russia) Natalya Nepryayeva
2020–21	(United States) Jessie Diggins	(Russia) Yuliya Stupak	(Sweden) Ebba Andersson
2021–22	(Russia) Natalya Nepryayeva	(United States) Jessie Diggins	(Sweden) Ebba Andersson (2)
2022–23	(Norway) Tiril Udnes Weng	(United States) Jessie Diggins (3)	(Finland) Kerttu Niskanen
2023–24	(United States) Jessie Diggins	(Sweden) Linn Svahn	(Sweden) Frida Karlsson
2024–25	(United States) Jessie Diggins (3)	(Germany) Victoria Carl	(Finland) Kerttu Niskanen (2)

^{1} Trial WC
^{2} Marja-Liisa Kirvesniemi née Hämälainen married Harri Kirvesniemi
^{3} Bente Skari née Martinsen married Geir Skari in 1999

- Medals:

Rank	Nation	Gold	Silver	Bronze	Total
1	Norway (NOR)	17	17	12	46
2	Finland (FIN)	7	1	5	13
3	Russia (RUS)	6	6	8	20
4	Soviet Union (URS)	5	4	3	12
5	Poland (POL)	4	1	1	6
6	Italy (ITA)	3	4	5	12
7	United States (USA)	3	3	1	7
8	CIS (CIS)	1	0	1	2
9	Czechoslovakia (TCH)	0	3	5	8
10	Sweden (SWE)	0	2	3	5
11	Estonia (EST)	0	2	0	2
12	Slovenia (SLO)	0	1	1	2
13	Canada (CAN)	0	1	0	1
13	Germany (GER)	0	1	0	1
15	Ukraine (UKR)	0	0	1	1
Totals (15 entries)		46	46	46	138

=== Sprint ===
Season	Winner	Runner-up	Third
1996–97	(Italy) Stefania Belmondo	(Russia) Yelena Välbe	(Czech Republic) Kateřina Neumannová
1997–98	(Norway) Bente Martinsen	(Russia) Larisa Lazutina	(Italy) Stefania Belmondo
1998–99	(Norway) Bente Martinsen	(Czech Republic) Kateřina Neumannová	(Estonia) Kristina Šmigun
1999–00	(Norway) Bente Martinsen	(Norway) Anita Moen	(Estonia) Kristina Šmigun (2)
2000–01	(Norway) Bente Skari ^{1}	(Finland) Pirjo Manninen	(Germany) Manuela Henkel
2001–02	(Norway) Bente Skari ^{1} (5)	(Norway) Anita Moen (2)	(Czech Republic) Kateřina Neumannová (2)
2002–03	(Norway) Marit Bjørgen	(Norway) Bente Skari ^{1}	(Finland) Pirjo Manninen
2003–04	(Norway) Marit Bjørgen	(Italy) Gabriella Paruzzi	(Sweden) Anna Dahlberg
2004–05	(Norway) Marit Bjørgen	(Finland) Virpi Kuitunen	(Sweden) Anna Dahlberg (2)
2005–06	(Norway) Marit Bjørgen	(Norway) Ella Gjømle	(Canada) Beckie Scott
2006–07	(Finland) Virpi Kuitunen	(Slovenia) Petra Majdič	(Russia) Natalya Matveyeva
2007–08	(Slovenia) Petra Majdič	(Norway) Astrid Uhrenholdt Jacobsen	(Finland) Virpi Kuitunen
2008–09	(Slovenia) Petra Majdič	(Italy) Arianna Follis	(Finland) Pirjo Muranen (2)
2009–10	(Poland) Justyna Kowalczyk	(Norway) Marit Bjørgen	(Slovenia) Petra Majdič
2010–11	(Slovenia) Petra Majdič (3)	(Italy) Arianna Follis (2)	(United States) Kikkan Randall
2011–12	(United States) Kikkan Randall	(Norway) Maiken Caspersen Falla	(Norway) Marit Bjørgen
2012–13	(United States) Kikkan Randall	(Poland) Justyna Kowalczyk	(Norway) Ingvild Flugstad Østberg
2013–14	(United States) Kikkan Randall (3)	(Germany) Denise Herrmann	(Norway) Marit Bjørgen (2)
2014–15	(Norway) Marit Bjørgen (5)	(Norway) Ingvild Flugstad Østberg	(Norway) Maiken Caspersen Falla
2015–16	(Norway) Maiken Caspersen Falla	(Norway) Ingvild Flugstad Østberg (2)	(Sweden) Stina Nilsson
2016–17	(Norway) Maiken Caspersen Falla	(Sweden) Stina Nilsson	(Sweden) Hanna Falk
2017–18	(Norway) Maiken Caspersen Falla (3)	(Sweden) Stina Nilsson (2)	(United States) Sophie Caldwell
2018–19	(Sweden) Stina Nilsson	(Norway) Maiken Caspersen Falla (2)	(Sweden) Maja Dahlqvist
2019–20	(Sweden) Linn Svahn	(Sweden) Jonna Sundling	(Slovenia) Anamarija Lampič
2020–21	(Slovenia) Anamarija Lampič	(Switzerland) Nadine Fähndrich	(Sweden) Linn Svahn
2021–22	(Sweden) Maja Dahlqvist	(Slovenia) Anamarija Lampič	(Sweden) Jonna Sundling
2022–23	(Sweden) Maja Dahlqvist (2)	(Switzerland) Nadine Fähndrich	(Norway) Tiril Udnes Weng
2023–24	(Sweden) Linn Svahn (2)	(Norway) Kristine Stavås Skistad	(Sweden) Jonna Sundling (2)
2024–25	(Finland) Jasmi Joensuu	(Switzerland) Nadine Fähndrich (3)	(Sweden) Maja Dahlqvist (2)

^{1} Bente Skari née Martinsen married Geir Skari in 1999

- Medals:

Rank	Nation	Gold	Silver	Bronze	Total
1	Norway (NOR)	13	11	5	29
2	Sweden (SWE)	5	3	9	17
3	Slovenia (SLO)	4	2	2	8
4	United States (USA)	3	0	2	5
5	Finland (FIN)	2	2	3	7
6	Italy (ITA)	1	3	1	5
7	Poland (POL)	1	1	0	2
8	Switzerland (SUI)	0	3	0	3
9	Russia (RUS)	0	2	1	3
10	Czechoslovakia (TCH)	0	1	2	3
11	Germany (GER)	0	1	1	2
12	Estonia (EST)	0	0	2	2
13	Canada (CAN)	0	0	1	1
Totals (13 entries)		29	29	29	87

=== Distance ===
Season	Winner	Runner-up	Third
1996–97¹	(Russia) Yelena Välbe	(Italy) Stefania Belmondo	(Russia) Nina Gavrilyuk
1997–98¹	(Russia) Larisa Lazutina	(Italy) Stefania Belmondo	(Russia) Olga Danilova
1998–99¹	(Estonia) Kristina Šmigun	(Italy) Stefania Belmondo (3)	(Russia) Larisa Lazutina
1999–00	not arranged		
2000–01	not arranged		
2001–02	not arranged		
2002–03	not arranged		
2003–04	(Ukraine) Valentyna Shevchenko	(Italy) Gabriella Paruzzi	(Estonia) Kristina Šmigun
2004–05	(Norway) Marit Bjørgen	(Czech Republic) Kateřina Neumannová	(Estonia) Kristina Šmigun (2)
2005–06	(Russia) Yuliya Chepalova	(Czech Republic) Kateřina Neumannová	(Canada) Beckie Scott
2006–07	(Finland) Virpi Kuitunen	(Czech Republic) Kateřina Neumannová (3)	(Finland) Aino-Kaisa Saarinen
2007–08	(Finland) Virpi Kuitunen (2)	(Ukraine) Valentyna Shevchenko	(Poland) Justyna Kowalczyk
2008–09	(Poland) Justyna Kowalczyk	(Finland) Aino-Kaisa Saarinen	(Italy) Marianna Longa
2009–10	(Poland) Justyna Kowalczyk	(Norway) Marit Bjørgen	(Norway) Kristin Størmer Steira
2010–11	(Poland) Justyna Kowalczyk	(Norway) Marit Bjørgen	(Norway) Therese Johaug
2011–12	(Norway) Marit Bjørgen	(Poland) Justyna Kowalczyk	(Norway) Therese Johaug (2)
2012–13	(Poland) Justyna Kowalczyk (4)	(Norway) Therese Johaug	(Norway) Kristin Størmer Steira (2)
2013–14	(Norway) Therese Johaug	(Norway) Marit Bjørgen	(Finland) Kerttu Niskanen
2014–15	(Norway) Marit Bjørgen (3)	(Norway) Therese Johaug (2)	(Norway) Heidi Weng
2015–16	(Norway) Therese Johaug	(Norway) Heidi Weng	(Norway) Ingvild Flugstad Østberg
2016–17	(Norway) Heidi Weng	(Norway) Marit Bjørgen (4)	(Finland) Krista Pärmäkoski
2017–18	(Norway) Heidi Weng (2)	(Norway) Ingvild Flugstad Østberg	(United States) Jessie Diggins
2018–19	(Norway) Therese Johaug	(Norway) Ingvild Flugstad Østberg (2)	(Russia) Natalya Nepryayeva
2019–20	(Norway) Therese Johaug	(Norway) Heidi Weng (2)	(Sweden) Ebba Andersson
2020–21	(United States) Jessie Diggins	(Sweden) Ebba Andersson	(Russia) Yuliya Stupak
2021–22	(Norway) Therese Johaug (5)	(Sweden) Frida Karlsson	(Finland) Krista Pärmäkoski (2)
2022–23	(Finland) Kerttu Niskanen	(United States) Jessie Diggins	(Norway) Tiril Udnes Weng
2023–24	(United States) Jessie Diggins	(Germany) Victoria Carl	(Sweden) Ebba Andersson (2)
2024–25	(United States) Jessie Diggins (3)	(Norway) Astrid Øyre Slind	(Germany) Victoria Carl

¹ arranged under the name of "Long Distance World Cup"

- Medals:

Rank	Nation	Gold	Silver	Bronze	Total
1	Norway (NOR)	10	11	7	28
2	Poland (POL)	4	1	1	6
3	Finland (FIN)	3	1	4	8
4	United States (USA)	3	1	1	5
5	Russia (RUS)	3	0	5	8
6	Ukraine (UKR)	1	1	0	2
7	Estonia (EST)	1	0	2	3
8	Italy (ITA)	0	4	1	5
9	Czechoslovakia (TCH)	0	3	0	3
10	Sweden (SWE)	0	2	2	4
11	Germany (GER)	0	1	1	2
12	Canada (CAN)	0	0	1	1
Totals (12 entries)		25	25	25	75

== Nations Cup ==
All results of female and male athletes of a nation are counted for the Nations Cup.

Season	Winner	Runner-up	Third	Winner (men)	Winner (women)
1981–82	Norway	Czechoslovakia	Sweden	Norway	Norway
1982–83	Norway	Soviet Union	Finland	Norway	Norway
1983–84	Norway	Soviet Union	Sweden	Norway	Norway
1984–85	Norway	Sweden	Soviet Union	Norway	Norway
1985–86	Norway	Sweden	Soviet Union	Sweden	Norway
1986–87	Sweden	Norway	Soviet Union (3)	Sweden	Norway
1987–88	Sweden (2)	Soviet Union (3)	Norway	Sweden	Soviet Union
1988–89	Soviet Union	Sweden	Norway (2)	Sweden	Soviet Union
1989–90	Soviet Union	Norway	Sweden	Norway	Soviet Union
1990–91	Soviet Union (3)	Norway	Sweden	Norway	Soviet Union (4)
1991–92	Norway	Russia	Italy	Norway	Russia
1992–93	Norway	Russia	Italy	Norway	Russia
1993–94	Norway	Russia	Italy	Norway	Russia
1994–95	Russia	Norway	Italy	Norway	Russia
1995–96	Russia	Norway	Italy	Norway	Russia
1996–97	Norway	Russia	Italy	Norway	Russia
1997–98	Norway	Russia	Italy	Norway	Russia
1998–99	Norway	Russia	Sweden	Norway	Russia
1999–00	Norway	Russia	Italy	Norway	Russia
2000–01	Norway	Russia	Italy	Norway	Russia (10)
2001–02	Norway	Russia	Italy	Norway	Norway
2002–03	Norway	Germany	Sweden	Sweden (5)	Norway
2003–04	Norway	Germany	Italy	Norway	Norway
2004–05	Norway	Germany	Russia	Norway	Norway
2005–06	Norway	Sweden	Germany	Norway	Norway
2006–07	Norway	Germany (4)	Finland	Norway	Finland
2007–08	Norway	Finland	Germany (2)	Norway	Norway
2008–09	Norway	Finland (2)	Italy (12)	Norway	Finland (2)
2009–10	Norway	Russia	Sweden	Norway	Norway
2010–11	Norway	Sweden	Russia	Norway	Norway
2011–12	Norway	Russia	Sweden	Russia	Norway
2012–13	Norway	Russia	Sweden	Russia	Norway
2013–14	Norway	Russia	Sweden	Norway	Norway
2014–15	Norway	Russia	Sweden	Norway	Norway
2015–16	Norway	Russia	Finland	Norway	Norway
2016–17	Norway	Sweden	Finland	Norway	Norway
2017–18	Norway	Sweden	Russia	Norway	Norway
2018–19	Norway	Russia	Sweden	Norway	Norway
2019–20	Norway	Russia (17)	Sweden	Norway	Norway
2020–21	Russia (3)	Norway (6)	Sweden (14)	Russia (3)	Sweden
2021–22	Norway	Sweden	Russia (4)	Norway	Sweden
2022–23	Norway	Sweden	Finland	Norway	Norway
2023–24	Norway	Sweden	Finland	Norway	Sweden (3)
2024–25	Norway (36)	Sweden (11)	Finland (7)	Norway (36)	Norway (25)

== See also ==
- List of Olympic medalists in cross-country skiing
- FIS Nordic World Ski Championships
