= 2022–23 FIS Cross-Country World Cup =

Cross-country skiing competition

Discipline	Men	Women
Overall	(Norway) Johannes Høsflot Klæbo (4)	(Norway) Tiril Udnes Weng (1)
Distance	(Norway) Pål Golberg (1)	(Finland) Kerttu Niskanen (1)
Sprint	(Norway) Johannes Høsflot Klæbo (5)	(Sweden) Maja Dahlqvist (2)
U23	(United States) Ben Ogden (1)	(Latvia) Patrīcija Eiduka (1)
Bonus Ranking	(Norway) Johannes Høsflot Klæbo (3)	(Norway) Tiril Udnes Weng (1)
Nations Cup	Norway (34)	Norway (24)
- Nations Cup Overall: Norway (34)

Stage events
Tour de Ski	(Norway) Johannes Høsflot Klæbo (3)	(Sweden) Frida Karlsson (1)

Competition
Locations	15 venues	15 venues
Individual	30 events	30 events
Relay/Team	5 events	5 events
Cancelled	2 events	2 events
Rescheduled	2 events	2 events

The 2022–23 FIS Cross-Country World Cup, organized by the International Ski Federation was the 42nd World Cup in cross-country skiing for men and women. The season started on 25 November 2022 in Ruka, Finland and concluded on 26 March 2023 in Lahti, Finland.

The season featured a break in February and March for the World Championships in Planica.

Johannes Høsflot Klæbo from Norway and Natalya Nepryayeva from Russia were the defending overall champions from the 2021–22 season. Nepryayeva couldn't defend her title because of the decision of the FIS Council, that Russia and Belarus have been suspended for this World Cup season due to the Russian invasion of Ukraine.

Klæbo defended the title and won his fourth World Cup title. Women's overall victory award went to Norwegian Tiril Udnes Weng for the first time.

== Map of world cup hosts ==
All 15 locations hosting world cup events in this season.

Europe

Period I Period II – Tour de Ski Period III Period IV

== Men ==
=== Calendar ===
Key: C – Classic / F – Freestyle
WC	Stage	Date	Place	Discipline	Winner	Second	Third	Yellow bib	Ref.
1	1	25 November 2022	(Finland) Ruka	Sprint C	(Norway) Johannes Høsflot Klæbo	(Norway) Even Northug	(Norway) Pål Golberg	(Norway) Johannes Høsflot Klæbo	
2	2	26 November 2022	(Finland) Ruka	10 km C	(Norway) Johannes Høsflot Klæbo	(Norway) Pål Golberg	(Norway) Martin Løwstrøm Nyenget	(Norway) Johannes Høsflot Klæbo	
3	3	27 November 2022	(Finland) Ruka	20 km F Pursuit	(Norway) Johannes Høsflot Klæbo	(Norway) Pål Golberg	(Italy) Federico Pellegrino	(Norway) Johannes Høsflot Klæbo	
4	4	2 December 2022	(Norway) Lillehammer	10 km F	(Norway) Iver Tildheim Andersen	(Norway) Didrik Tønseth	(Norway) Hans Christer Holund	(Norway) Pål Golberg	
5	5	3 December 2022	(Norway) Lillehammer	Sprint F	(Norway) Johannes Høsflot Klæbo	(Italy) Federico Pellegrino	(Norway) Even Northug	(Norway) Pål Golberg	
6	6	4 December 2022	(Norway) Lillehammer	20 km C Mass Start	(Norway) Pål Golberg	(Norway) Sjur Røthe	(Norway) Martin Løwstrøm Nyenget	(Norway) Pål Golberg	
7	7	9 December 2022	(Norway) Beitostølen	Sprint C	(France) Richard Jouve	(Italy) Simone Mocellini	(Sweden) Calle Halfvarsson	(Norway) Pål Golberg	
8	8	10 December 2022	(Norway) Beitostølen	10 km C	(Norway) Pål Golberg	(Norway) Didrik Tønseth	(United Kingdom) Andrew Musgrave	(Norway) Pål Golberg	
9	9	17 December 2022	(Switzerland) Davos	Sprint F	(Italy) Federico Pellegrino	(Norway) Johannes Høsflot Klæbo	(France) Lucas Chanavat	(Norway) Pål Golberg	
10	10	18 December 2022	(Switzerland) Davos	20 km F	(Norway) Simen Hegstad Krüger	(Norway) Hans Christer Holund	(Norway) Sjur Røthe	(Norway) Pål Golberg	
TdS	11	31 December 2022	(Switzerland) Val Müstair	Sprint F	(Norway) Johannes Høsflot Klæbo	(Italy) Federico Pellegrino	(Norway) Sindre Bjørnestad Skar	(Norway) Pål Golberg	
TdS	12	1 January 2023	(Switzerland) Val Müstair	10 km C Pursuit	(Norway) Johannes Høsflot Klæbo	(Norway) Pål Golberg	(Italy) Federico Pellegrino	(Norway) Pål Golberg	
TdS	13	3 January 2023	(Germany) Oberstdorf	10 km C	(Norway) Johannes Høsflot Klæbo	(Norway) Simen Hegstad Krüger	(Norway) Didrik Tønseth	(Norway) Pål Golberg	
TdS	14	4 January 2023	(Germany) Oberstdorf	20 km F Pursuit	(Norway) Johannes Høsflot Klæbo	(Norway) Sindre Bjørnestad Skar	(Italy) Federico Pellegrino	(Norway) Pål Golberg	
TdS	15	6 January 2023	(Italy) Val di Fiemme	Sprint C	(Norway) Johannes Høsflot Klæbo	(Sweden) Calle Halfvarsson	(Italy) Simone Mocellini	(Norway) Pål Golberg	
TdS	16	7 January 2023	(Italy) Val di Fiemme	15 km C Mass Start	(Norway) Johannes Høsflot Klæbo	(Norway) Pål Golberg	(Italy) Francesco de Fabiani	(Norway) Pål Golberg	
TdS	17	8 January 2023	(Italy) Val di Fiemme	10 km F Mass Start Climb	(Norway) Simen Hegstad Krüger	(Norway) Hans Christer Holund	(France) Jules Lapierre	(Norway) Pål Golberg	
11	17th Tour de Ski Overall (31 December 2022 – 8 January 2023)				(Norway) Johannes Høsflot Klæbo	(Norway) Simen Hegstad Krüger	(Norway) Hans Christer Holund	(Norway) Johannes Høsflot Klæbo	
		21 January 2023	(Italy) Milan	Sprint F	cancelled				
12	18	21 January 2023	(Italy) Livigno	Sprint F	(Norway) Johannes Høsflot Klæbo	(France) Richard Jouve	(Switzerland) Janik Riebli	(Norway) Johannes Høsflot Klæbo	
13	19	27 January 2023	(France) Les Rousses	10 km F	(Norway) Harald Østberg Amundsen	(Norway) Sjur Røthe	(Sweden) William Poromaa	(Norway) Johannes Høsflot Klæbo	
14	20	28 January 2023	(France) Les Rousses	Sprint C	(France) Richard Jouve	(Norway) Johannes Høsflot Klæbo	(Norway) Pål Golberg	(Norway) Johannes Høsflot Klæbo	
15	21	29 January 2023	(France) Les Rousses	20 km C Mass Start	(Norway) Johannes Høsflot Klæbo	(Finland) Iivo Niskanen	(Sweden) William Poromaa	(Norway) Johannes Høsflot Klæbo	
16	22	3 February 2023	(Italy) Toblach	Sprint F	(Norway) Johannes Høsflot Klæbo	(Norway) Håvard Solås Taugbøl	(Italy) Federico Pellegrino	(Norway) Johannes Høsflot Klæbo	
17	23	4 February 2023	(Italy) Toblach	10 km F	(Norway) Pål Golberg	(Norway) Simen Hegstad Krüger	(Norway) Johannes Høsflot Klæbo	(Norway) Johannes Høsflot Klæbo	
FIS Nordic World Ski Championships 2023 (21 February – 5 March)
World Championships		23 February 2023	(Slovenia) Planica	Sprint C	(Norway) Johannes Høsflot Klæbo	(Norway) Pål Golberg	(France) Jules Chappaz	not included in the World Cup	
World Championships		24 February 2023	(Slovenia) Planica	30 km Skiathlon	(Norway) Simen Hegstad Krüger	(Norway) Johannes Høsflot Klæbo	(Norway) Sjur Røthe	not included in the World Cup	
World Championships		1 March 2023	(Slovenia) Planica	15 km F	(Norway) Simen Hegstad Krüger	(Norway) Harald Østberg Amundsen	(Norway) Hans Christer Holund	not included in the World Cup	
World Championships		5 March 2023	(Slovenia) Planica	50 km C Mass Start	(Norway) Pål Golberg	(Norway) Johannes Høsflot Klæbo	(Sweden) William Poromaa	not included in the World Cup	
18	24	11 March 2023	(Norway) Oslo	50 km F Mass Start	(Norway) Simen Hegstad Krüger	(Norway) Hans Christer Holund	(Norway) Martin Løwstrøm Nyenget	(Norway) Johannes Høsflot Klæbo	
19	25	14 March 2023	(Norway) Drammen	Sprint C	(Norway) Johannes Høsflot Klæbo	(Norway) Erik Valnes	(France) Richard Jouve	(Norway) Johannes Høsflot Klæbo	
20	26	17 March 2023	(Sweden) Falun	10 km C	(Norway) Johannes Høsflot Klæbo	(Norway) Martin Løwstrøm Nyenget	(Norway) Harald Østberg Amundsen	(Norway) Johannes Høsflot Klæbo	
21	27	18 March 2023	(Sweden) Falun	Sprint F	(Norway) Johannes Høsflot Klæbo	(Norway) Erik Valnes	(Italy) Federico Pellegrino	(Norway) Johannes Høsflot Klæbo	
22	28	21 March 2023	(Estonia) Tallinn	Sprint F	(Norway) Johannes Høsflot Klæbo	(France) Lucas Chanavat	(Norway) Even Northug	(Norway) Johannes Høsflot Klæbo	
23	29	25 March 2023	(Finland) Lahti	Sprint C	(Norway) Johannes Høsflot Klæbo	(Sweden) Calle Halfvarsson	(Norway) Erik Valnes	(Norway) Johannes Høsflot Klæbo	
24	30	26 March 2023	(Finland) Lahti	20 km C Mass Start	(Norway) Johannes Høsflot Klæbo	(Norway) Pål Golberg	(Sweden) William Poromaa	(Norway) Johannes Høsflot Klæbo	

=== Men's relay ===
Key: C – Classic / F – Freestyle
WC	Date	Place	Discipline	Winner	Second	Third	Overall leader	Ref.
	22 January 2023	(Italy) Milan	Team Sprint F	cancelled				
1	22 January 2023	(Italy) Livigno	Team Sprint F	France I Renaud Jay; Richard Jouve	Italy I Francesco De Fabiani; Federico Pellegrino	Switzerland I Janik Riebli; Valerio Grond	Norway	
2	5 February 2023	(Italy) Toblach	4 × 7.5 km Relay C/F	Italy I Dietmar Nöckler; Francesco De Fabiani; Simone Daprà; Federico Pellegrino	Sweden Eric Rosjö; Calle Halfvarsson; Johan Häggström; Edvin Anger	Norway I Sjur Røthe; Didrik Tønseth; Simen Hegstad Krüger; Harald Østberg Amundsen	Norway	
FIS Nordic World Ski Championships 2023 (21 February – 5 March)
WC	26 February 2023	(Slovenia) Planica	Team Sprint F	Norway Pål Golberg; Johannes Høsflot Klæbo	Italy Francesco De Fabiani; Federico Pellegrino	France Renaud Jay; Richard Jouve	not included in the World Cup	
WC	3 March 2023	(Slovenia) Planica	4 × 10 km Relay C/F	Norway Hans Christer Holund; Pål Golberg; Simen Hegstad Krüger; Johannes Høsflot Klæbo	Finland Ristomatti Hakola; Iivo Niskanen; Perttu Hyvärinen; Niko Anttola	Germany Albert Kuchler; Janosch Brugger; Jonas Dobler; Friedrich Moch	not included in the World Cup	
3	24 March 2023	(Finland) Lahti	Team Sprint F	Norway I Erik Valnes; Johannes Høsflot Klæbo	Italy I Francesco De Fabiani; Federico Pellegrino	Norway II Harald Østberg Amundsen; Sindre Bjørnestad Skar	Norway	

=== Standings ===
==== Overall ====
Rank	after all 31 events	Points
	(Norway) Johannes Høsflot Klæbo	2715
2	(Norway) Pål Golberg	2243
3	(Italy) Federico Pellegrino	1635
4	(Norway) Simen Hegstad Krüger	1281
5	(Norway) Didrik Tønseth	1269
6	(Norway) Hans Christer Holund	1218
7	(Sweden) Calle Halfvarsson	1133
8	(United States) Ben Ogden	1118
9	(Czech Republic) Michal Novák	1002
10	(Norway) Erik Valnes	967

==== Distance ====
Rank	after all 17 events	Points
	(Norway) Pål Golberg	1258
2	(Norway) Johannes Høsflot Klæbo	1154
3	(Norway) Didrik Tønseth	1065
4	(Norway) Simen Hegstad Krüger	971
5	(Norway) Hans Christer Holund	948
6	(Norway) Martin Løwstrøm Nyenget	838
7	(Sweden) William Poromaa	794
8	(United Kingdom) Andrew Musgrave	745
9	(Norway) Sjur Røthe	613
10	(Norway) Harald Østberg Amundsen	591

==== Sprint ====
Rank	after all 13 events	Points
	(Norway) Johannes Høsflot Klæbo	1261
2	(France) Lucas Chanavat	907
3	(Norway) Even Northug	843
4	(Italy) Federico Pellegrino	815
5	(Sweden) Edvin Anger	779
6	(France) Richard Jouve	767
7	(Norway) Pål Golberg	745
8	(Norway) Erik Valnes	721
9	(France) Renaud Jay	634
10	(United States) Ben Ogden	633

==== U23 ====
Rank	after all 31 events	Points
	(United States) Ben Ogden	1118
2	(Sweden) William Poromaa	915
3	(Sweden) Edvin Anger	905
4	(Germany) Friedrich Moch	786
5	(Switzerland) Valerio Grond	507
6	(Finland) Niilo Moilanen	448
7	(Norway) Iver Tildheim Andersen	418
8	(Norway) Ansgar Evensen	322
9	(United States) Gus Schumacher	269
10	(Italy) Davide Graz	259

==== Bonus Ranking ====
Rank	after all 7 events	Points
1	(Norway) Johannes Høsflot Klæbo	243
2	(Norway) Pål Golberg	147
3	(Norway) Didrik Tønseth	113
4	(France) Lucas Chanavat	88
5	(Norway) Sindre Bjørnestad Skar	80
6	(Norway) Simen Hegstad Krüger	77
7	(Norway) Hans Christer Holund	77
8	(Czech Republic) Michal Novák	77
9	(Italy) Federico Pellegrino	76
10	(Sweden) Calle Halfvarsson	76

==== Prize money ====
Rank	after all 45 payouts	CHF
1	(Norway) Johannes Høsflot Klæbo	380 800
2	(Norway) Pål Golberg	184 800
3	(Norway) Simen Hegstad Krüger	141 550
4	(Italy) Federico Pellegrino	127 300
5	(Norway) Hans Christer Holund	86 700
6	(Norway) Didrik Tønseth	70 600
7	(France) Richard Jouve	65 300
8	(Sweden) Calle Halfvarsson	56 000
9	(Norway) Erik Valnes	51 800
10	(Norway) Sjur Røthe	47 900

== Women ==
=== Calendar ===
Key: C – Classic / F – Freestyle
WC	Stage	Date	Place	Discipline	Winner	Second	Third	Yellow bib	Ref.
1	1	25 November 2022	(Finland) Ruka	Sprint C	(Sweden) Emma Ribom	(Sweden) Johanna Hagström	(Norway) Tiril Udnes Weng	(Sweden) Emma Ribom	
2	2	26 November 2022	(Finland) Ruka	10 km C	(Sweden) Ebba Andersson	(Sweden) Frida Karlsson	(Germany) Katharina Hennig	(Norway) Tiril Udnes Weng	
3	3	27 November 2022	(Finland) Ruka	20 km F Pursuit	(Sweden) Frida Karlsson	(Sweden) Ebba Andersson	(Norway) Tiril Udnes Weng	(Sweden) Frida Karlsson	
4	4	2 December 2022	(Norway) Lillehammer	10 km F	(United States) Jessie Diggins	(Germany) Katharina Hennig	(Norway) Heidi Weng	(Norway) Tiril Udnes Weng	
5	5	3 December 2022	(Norway) Lillehammer	Sprint F	(Sweden) Emma Ribom	(Sweden) Maja Dahlqvist	(Norway) Tiril Udnes Weng	(Norway) Tiril Udnes Weng	
6	6	4 December 2022	(Norway) Lillehammer	20 km C Mass Start	(Sweden) Frida Karlsson	(Norway) Tiril Udnes Weng	(Sweden) Ebba Andersson	(Norway) Tiril Udnes Weng	
7	7	9 December 2022	(Norway) Beitostølen	Sprint C	(Switzerland) Nadine Fähndrich	(Norway) Lotta Udnes Weng	(Finland) Johanna Matintalo	(Norway) Tiril Udnes Weng	
8	8	10 December 2022	(Norway) Beitostølen	10 km C	(Finland) Kerttu Niskanen	(Norway) Anne Kjersti Kalvå	(Sweden) Frida Karlsson	(Norway) Tiril Udnes Weng	
9	9	17 December 2022	(Switzerland) Davos	Sprint F	(Switzerland) Nadine Fähndrich	(United States) Jessie Diggins	(Sweden) Johanna Hagström	(Norway) Tiril Udnes Weng	
10	10	18 December 2022	(Switzerland) Davos	20 km F	(United States) Jessie Diggins	(Norway) Ingvild Flugstad Østberg	(United States) Rosie Brennan	(Norway) Tiril Udnes Weng	
TdS	11	31 December 2022	(Switzerland) Val Müstair	Sprint F	(Switzerland) Nadine Fähndrich	(Sweden) Maja Dahlqvist	(Norway) Lotta Udnes Weng	(Norway) Tiril Udnes Weng	
TdS	12	1 January 2023	(Switzerland) Val Müstair	10 km C Pursuit	(Norway) Tiril Udnes Weng	(Finland) Kerttu Niskanen	(Sweden) Frida Karlsson	(Norway) Tiril Udnes Weng	
TdS	13	3 January 2023	(Germany) Oberstdorf	10 km C	(Sweden) Frida Karlsson	(Finland) Krista Pärmäkoski	(Norway) Anne Kjersti Kalvå	(Norway) Tiril Udnes Weng	
TdS	14	4 January 2023	(Germany) Oberstdorf	20 km F Pursuit	(Sweden) Frida Karlsson	(Finland) Krista Pärmäkoski	(Norway) Tiril Udnes Weng	(Norway) Tiril Udnes Weng	
TdS	15	6 January 2023	(Italy) Val di Fiemme	Sprint C	(Norway) Lotta Udnes Weng	(Norway) Tiril Udnes Weng	(Norway) Mathilde Myhrvold	(Norway) Tiril Udnes Weng	
TdS	16	7 January 2023	(Italy) Val di Fiemme	15 km C Mass Start	(Germany) Katharina Hennig	(Sweden) Frida Karlsson	(Finland) Kerttu Niskanen	(Norway) Tiril Udnes Weng	
TdS	17	8 January 2023	(Italy) Val di Fiemme	10 km F Mass Start Climb	(France) Delphine Claudel	(Norway) Heidi Weng	(United States) Sophia Laukli	(Norway) Tiril Udnes Weng	
11	17th Tour de Ski Overall (31 December 2022 – 8 January 2023)				(Sweden) Frida Karlsson	(Finland) Kerttu Niskanen	(Norway) Tiril Udnes Weng	(Norway) Tiril Udnes Weng	
		21 January 2023	(Italy) Milan	Sprint F	cancelled				
12	18	21 January 2023	(Italy) Livigno	Sprint F	(Sweden) Jonna Sundling	(Sweden) Maja Dahlqvist	(Sweden) Emma Ribom	(Norway) Tiril Udnes Weng	
13	19	27 January 2023	(France) Les Rousses	10 km F	(Sweden) Ebba Andersson	(France) Delphine Claudel	(United States) Jessie Diggins	(Norway) Tiril Udnes Weng	
14	20	28 January 2023	(France) Les Rousses	Sprint C	(Norway) Kristine Stavås Skistad	(Sweden) Emma Ribom	(Sweden) Maja Dahlqvist	(Norway) Tiril Udnes Weng	
15	21	29 January 2023	(France) Les Rousses	20 km C Mass Start	(Sweden) Ebba Andersson	(Finland) Kerttu Niskanen	(Norway) Astrid Øyre Slind	(Norway) Tiril Udnes Weng	
16	22	3 February 2023	(Italy) Toblach	Sprint F	(Sweden) Jonna Sundling	(Sweden) Maja Dahlqvist	(United States) Jessie Diggins	(Norway) Tiril Udnes Weng	
17	23	4 February 2023	(Italy) Toblach	10 km F	(Sweden) Ebba Andersson	(United States) Jessie Diggins	(Norway) Ingvild Flugstad Østberg	(Norway) Tiril Udnes Weng	
FIS Nordic World Ski Championships 2023 (21 February – 5 March)
World Championships		23 February 2023	(Slovenia) Planica	Sprint C	(Sweden) Jonna Sundling	(Sweden) Emma Ribom	(Sweden) Maja Dahlqvist	not included in the World Cup	
World Championships		25 February 2023	(Slovenia) Planica	15 km Skiathlon	(Sweden) Ebba Andersson	(Sweden) Frida Karlsson	(Norway) Astrid Øyre Slind	not included in the World Cup	
World Championships		28 February 2023	(Slovenia) Planica	10 km F	(United States) Jessie Diggins	(Sweden) Frida Karlsson	(Sweden) Ebba Andersson	not included in the World Cup	
World Championships		4 March 2023	(Slovenia) Planica	30 km C Mass Start	(Sweden) Ebba Andersson	(Norway) Anne Kjersti Kalvå	(Sweden) Frida Karlsson	not included in the World Cup	
18	24	12 March 2023	(Norway) Oslo	50 km F Mass Start	(Norway) Ragnhild Gløersen Haga	(Norway) Astrid Øyre Slind	(United States) Jessie Diggins	(Norway) Tiril Udnes Weng	
19	25	14 March 2023	(Norway) Drammen	Sprint C	(Norway) Kristine Stavås Skistad	(Sweden) Jonna Sundling	(Norway) Tiril Udnes Weng	(Norway) Tiril Udnes Weng	
20	26	17 March 2023	(Sweden) Falun	10 km C	(Finland) Kerttu Niskanen	(Germany) Katharina Hennig	(Norway) Anne Kjersti Kalvå	(Norway) Tiril Udnes Weng	
21	27	18 March 2023	(Sweden) Falun	Sprint F	(Norway) Kristine Stavås Skistad	(Sweden) Jonna Sundling	(Sweden) Maja Dahlqvist	(Norway) Tiril Udnes Weng	
22	28	21 March 2023	(Estonia) Tallinn	Sprint F	(Norway) Kristine Stavås Skistad	(Sweden) Jonna Sundling	(Switzerland) Nadine Fähndrich	(Norway) Tiril Udnes Weng	
23	29	25 March 2023	(Finland) Lahti	Sprint C	(Norway) Kristine Stavås Skistad	(Sweden) Jonna Sundling	(Norway) Tiril Udnes Weng	(Norway) Tiril Udnes Weng	
24	30	26 March 2023	(Finland) Lahti	20 km C Mass Start	(Norway) Anne Kjersti Kalvå	(Sweden) Jonna Sundling	(Germany) Katharina Hennig	(Norway) Tiril Udnes Weng	

=== Women's relay ===
Key: C – Classic / F – Freestyle
WC	Date	Place	Discipline	Winner	Second	Third	Overall leader	Ref.
	22 January 2023	(Italy) Milan	Team Sprint F	cancelled				
1	22 January 2023	(Italy) Livigno	Team Sprint F	Sweden II Linn Svahn; Maja Dahlqvist	Sweden I Emma Ribom; Jonna Sundling	United States I Rosie Brennan; Julia Kern	Norway	
2	5 February 2023	(Italy) Toblach	4 × 7.5 km Relay C/F	Norway I Heidi Weng; Anne Kjersti Kalvå; Ingvild Flugstad Østberg; Silje Theodorsen	Sweden I Emma Ribom; Ebba Andersson; Moa Ilar; Jonna Sundling	United States I Hailey Swirbul; Rosie Brennan; Jessie Diggins; Julia Kern	Norway	
FIS Nordic World Ski Championships 2023 (21 February – 5 March)
WC	26 February 2023	(Slovenia) Planica	Team Sprint F	Sweden Emma Ribom; Jonna Sundling	Norway Anne Kjersti Kalvå; Tiril Udnes Weng	United States Jessie Diggins; Julia Kern	not included in the World Cup	
WC	2 March 2023	(Slovenia) Planica	4 × 5 km Relay C/F	Norway Tiril Udnes Weng; Astrid Øyre Slind; Ingvild Flugstad Østberg; Anne Kjersti Kalvå	Germany Laura Gimmler; Katharina Hennig; Pia Fink; Victoria Carl	Sweden Emma Ribom; Ebba Andersson; Frida Karlsson; Maja Dahlqvist	not included in the World Cup	
3	24 March 2023	(Finland) Lahti	Team Sprint F	Sweden I Emma Ribom; Jonna Sundling	Norway I Julie Myhre; Anne Kjersti Kalvå	Germany I Laura Gimmler; Coletta Rydzek	Norway	

=== Standings ===
==== Overall ====
Rank	after all 31 events	Points
	(Norway) Tiril Udnes Weng	2029
2	(United States) Jessie Diggins	1867
3	(Finland) Kerttu Niskanen	1840
4	(United States) Rosie Brennan	1546
5	(Switzerland) Nadine Fähndrich	1414
6	(Sweden) Frida Karlsson	1365
7	(Germany) Katharina Hennig	1326
8	(Sweden) Maja Dahlqvist	1236
9	(Norway) Lotta Udnes Weng	1176
10	(Norway) Heidi Weng	1139

==== Distance ====
Rank	after all 17 events	Points
	(Finland) Kerttu Niskanen	1180
2	(United States) Jessie Diggins	1086
3	(Norway) Tiril Udnes Weng	946
4	(Norway) Heidi Weng	898
5	(Norway) Anne Kjersti Kalvå	868
6	(United States) Rosie Brennan	860
7	(Germany) Katharina Hennig	857
8	(Sweden) Frida Karlsson	835
9	(Sweden) Ebba Andersson	833
10	(Austria) Teresa Stadlober	776

==== Sprint ====
Rank	after all 13 events	Points
	(Sweden) Maja Dahlqvist	944
2	(Switzerland) Nadine Fähndrich	937
3	(Norway) Tiril Udnes Weng	813
4	(Sweden) Johanna Hagström	794
5	(Sweden) Jonna Sundling	747
6	(Norway) Kristine Stavås Skistad	743
7	(United States) Julia Kern	719
8	(Germany) Laura Gimmler	717
9	(Norway) Lotta Udnes Weng	633
10	(Norway) Ane Appelkvist Stenseth	620

==== U23 ====
Rank	after all 31 events	Points
	(Latvia) Patrīcija Eiduka	798
2	(Norway) Margrethe Bergane	463
3	(Norway) Maria Hartz Melling	367
4	(Finland) Jasmin Kähärä	360
5	(United States) Sophia Laukli	289
6	(Norway) Helene Marie Fossesholm	282
7	(Sweden) Märta Rosenberg	202
8	(Norway) Kristin Austgulen Fosnæs	190
9	(Norway) Hanne Wilberg Rofstad	174
10	(United States) Novie McCabe	166

==== Bonus Ranking ====
Rank	after all 7 events	Points
1	(Norway) Tiril Udnes Weng	183
2	(Finland) Kerttu Niskanen	176
3	(Norway) Lotta Udnes Weng	114
4	(United States) Jessie Diggins	108
5	(Sweden) Frida Karlsson	99
6	(Germany) Katharina Hennig	98
7	(Norway) Astrid Øyre Slind	92
8	(Switzerland) Nadine Fähndrich	84
9	(Sweden) Ebba Andersson	78
10	(Sweden) Maja Dahlqvist	76

==== Prize money ====
Rank	after all 45 payouts	CHF
1	(Sweden) Frida Karlsson	159 000
1	(Norway) Tiril Udnes Weng	159 000
3	(Finland) Kerttu Niskanen	149 600
4	(United States) Jessie Diggins	128 350
5	(Sweden) Jonna Sundling	110 350
6	(Sweden) Ebba Andersson	87 900
7	(Norway) Kristine Stavås Skistad	81 600
8	(United States) Rosie Brennan	77 750
9	(Germany) Katharina Hennig	75 000
10	(Switzerland) Nadine Fähndrich	74 200

== Mixed team ==
Key: C – Classic / F – Freestyle
WC	Date	Place	Discipline	Winner	Second	Third	Overall leader	Ref.
1	11 December 2022	(Norway) Beitostølen	4 × 5 km Relay C/F	Norway II Lotta Udnes Weng; Mikael Gunnulfsen; Silje Theodorsen; Simen Hegstad Krüger	Norway I Anne Kjersti Kalvå; Martin Løwstrøm Nyenget; Heidi Weng; Emil Iversen	Sweden I Maja Dahlqvist; William Poromaa; Frida Karlsson; Calle Halfvarsson	Norway	
2	19 March 2023	(Sweden) Falun	4 × 5 km Relay C/F	Sweden I Calle Halfvarsson; Moa Ilar; Edvin Anger; Jonna Sundling	Norway I Martin Løwstrøm Nyenget; Heidi Weng; Simen Hegstad Krüger; Anne Kjersti Kalvå	Germany I Albert Kuchler; Katharina Hennig; Anian Sossau; Victoria Carl	Norway	

== Nations Cup ==
=== Overall ===
Rank	after all 70 events	Points
1	Norway	16936
2	Sweden	12322
3	Finland	8646
4	United States	8338
5	France	7254
6	Germany	7203
7	Italy	5808
8	Switzerland	4779
9	Czech Republic	3974
10	Canada	2374

=== Men ===
Rank	after all 36 events	Points
1	Norway	9034
2	Sweden	5176
3	France	5121
4	Italy	3917
5	Finland	3465
6	United States	3003
7	Switzerland	2460
8	Germany	2264
9	Czech Republic	1906
10	Great Britain	1589

=== Women ===
Rank	after all 36 events	Points
1	Norway	7902
2	Sweden	7146
3	United States	5335
4	Finland	5181
5	Germany	4939
6	Switzerland	2319
7	France	2133
8	Czech Republic	2069
9	Italy	1891
10	Canada	1057

== Podium table by nation ==
Table showing the World Cup podium places (gold–1st place, silver–2nd place, bronze–3rd place) by the countries represented by the athletes.

Rank	Nation	Gold	Silver	Bronze	Total
1	Norway	40	33	31	104
2	Sweden	16	19	12	47
3	France	4	3	3	10
4	Switzerland	3	0	3	6
5	Finland	2	6	2	10
6	Italy	2	5	7	14
7	United States	2	2	7	11
8	Germany	1	2	4	7
9	Great Britain	0	0	1	1
Totals (9 entries)		70	70	70	210

== Points distribution ==
The table shows the number of points to win in every competition in the 2022/23 Cross-Country Skiing World Cup for men and women.

Place	1	2	3	4	5	6	7	8	9	10	11	12	13	14	15	16	17	18	19	20	21	22	23	24	25	26	27	28	29	30	31	32	33	34	35	36	37	38	39	40	41	42	43	44	45	46	47	48	49	50
Individual	100	95	90	85	80	75	72	69	66	63	60	58	56	54	52	50	48	46	44	42	40	38	36	34	32	30	28	26	24	22	20	19	18	17	16	15	14	13	12	11	10	9	8	7	6	5	4	3	2	1
Relay (Nations Cup)	200	160	120	100	90	80	72	64	58	52	48	44	40	36	32	30	28	26	24	22	20	18	16	14	12	10	8	6	4	2
Team Sprint (Nations Cup)	200	160	120	100	90	80	72	64	58	52	48	44	40	36	32	30	28	26	24	22	20	18	16	14	12	10	8	6	4	2
Tour de Ski	300	285	270	255	240	225	216	207	198	189	180	174	168	162	156	150	144	138	132	126	120	114	108	102	96	90	84	78	72	66	60	57	54	51	48	45	42	39	36	33	30	27	24	21	18	15	12	9	6	3
Stage Tour de Ski	50	47	44	41	38	35	32	30	28	26	24	22	20	18	16	15	14	13	12	11	10	9	8	7	6	5	4	3	2	1
Bonus points (Mass Start checkpoints)	15	12	10	8	6	5	4	3	2	1
Sprint Qualifications	15	12	10	8	6	5	4	3	2	1

== Achievements ==
Only individual events.

First World Cup career victory

Men

- (Norway) Iver Tildheim Andersen (22), in his 2nd season – the WC 4 (10 km F) in Lillehammer – 1st place; also first podium
- (Norway) Harald Østberg Amundsen (24), in his 5th season – the WC 13 (10 km F) in Les Rousses – 1st place; first podium was 2021–22 WC 15 (15 km F) in Falun

Women

- (Sweden) Emma Ribom (24), in her 5th season – the WC 1 (Sprint C) in Ruka; first podium was 2020–21 WC 5 (Sprint C) in Val di Fiemme
- (Norway) Tiril Udnes Weng (26), in her 9th season – the WC 11 (10 km Pursuit C) in Val Müstair; first podium was 2021–22 WC 4 (Sprint F) in Lillehammer
- (Norway) Lotta Udnes Weng (26), in her 9th season – the WC 11 (Sprint C) in Val di Fiemme; first podium was 2022–23 WC 7 (Sprint C) in Beitostølen
- (Germany) Katharina Hennig (26), in her 8th season – the WC 11 (15 km Mass Start C) in Val di Fiemme; first podium was 2019–20 WC 6 (10 km Mass Start C) in Val di Fiemme
- (France) Delphine Claudel (26), in her 7th season – the WC 11 (10 km Mass Start F) in Val di Fiemme; first podium was 2020–21 WC 5 (10 km Mass Start F) in Val di Fiemme
- (Norway) Kristine Stavås Skistad (23), in her 6th season – the WC 14 (Sprint C) in Les Rousses; also first podium
- (Norway) Anne Kjersti Kalvå (30), in her 10th season – the WC 24 (20 km C Mass Start) in Lahti; first podium was 2022–23 WC 8 (10 km C) in Beitostølen

First World Cup podium

Men

- (Norway) Iver Tildheim Andersen (22), in his 2nd season – the WC 4 (10 km F) in Lillehammer – 1st place
- (Norway) Even Northug (27), in his 8th season – the WC 1 (Sprint C) in Ruka – 2nd place
- (Italy) Simone Mocellini (24), in his 2nd season – the WC 7 (Sprint C) in Beitostølen – 2nd place
- (France) Jules Lapierre (27), in his 5th season – the WC 11 (10 km Mass Start F) in Val di Fiemme – 3rd place
- (Switzerland) Janik Riebli (24), in his 5th season – the WC 12 (Sprint F) in Livigno – 3rd place

Women

- (Norway) Lotta Udnes Weng (26), in her 9th season – the WC 7 (Sprint C) in Beitostølen – 2nd place
- (Norway) Anne Kjersti Kalvå (30), in her 10th season – the WC 8 (10 km C) in Beitostølen – 2nd place
- (United States) Sophia Laukli (22), in her 3rd season – the WC 11 (10 km Mass Start F) in Val di Fiemme – 3rd place
- (Norway) Kristine Stavås Skistad (23), in her 6th season – the WC 14 (Sprint C) in Les Rousses – 1st place
- (Norway) Astrid Øyre Slind (34), in her 8th season – the WC 15 (20 km Mass Start C) in Les Rousses – 3rd place

Number of wins this season (in brackets are all-time wins)

Men

- (Norway) Johannes Høsflot Klæbo – 20 (68)
- (Norway) Pål Golberg – 3 (10)
- (Norway) Simen Hegstad Krüger – 3 (9)
- (France) Richard Jouve – 2 (4)
- (Italy) Federico Pellegrino – 1 (17)
- (Norway) Harald Østberg Amundsen – 1 (1)
- (Norway) Iver Tildheim Andersen – 1 (1)

Women

- (Sweden) Frida Karlsson – 5 (8)
- (Norway) Kristine Stavås Skistad – 5 (5)
- (Sweden) Ebba Andersson – 4 (5)
- (Switzerland) Nadine Fähndrich – 3 (4)
- (United States) Jessie Diggins – 2 (14)
- (Sweden) Jonna Sundling – 2 (7)
- (Finland) Kerttu Niskanen – 2 (5)
- (Sweden) Emma Ribom – 2 (2)
- (Norway) Ragnhild Gløersen Haga – 1 (2)
- (France) Delphine Claudel – 1 (1)
- (Germany) Katharina Hennig – 1 (1)
- (Norway) Anne Kjersti Kalvå – 1 (1)
- (Norway) Lotta Udnes Weng – 1 (1)
- (Norway) Tiril Udnes Weng – 1 (1)

== Retirements ==
Men

- (Norway) Pål Trøan Aune
- (Germany) Jonas Dobler
- (Switzerland) Roman Furger
- (Norway) Hans Christer Holund
- (Slovakia) Ján Koristek
- (Slovakia) Peter Mlynár
- (Italy) Maicol Rastelli

Women

- (Canada) Dahria Beatty
- (Sweden) Anna Dyvik
- (Norway) Ragnhild Gløersen Haga
- (Sweden) Lovisa Modig
- (United States) Hailey Swirbul
- (Norway) Kathrine Harsem
- (Italy) Greta Laurent
- (Czech Republic) Petra Nováková
- (Slovakia) Alena Procházková
- (Czech Republic) Kateřina Razýmová
