= Simone Mocellini =

Italian cross-country skier (born 1998)

Personal information
- Nationality: Italy
- Born: 5 May 1998 (age 28) Tezze, Grigno, Italy

Sport
- Sport: Skiing
- Club: G.S. Fiamme Gialle

World Cup career
- Seasons: 2 – (2022–present)
- Indiv. starts: 19
- Indiv. podiums: 2
- Indiv. wins: 0
- Team starts: 3
- Team podiums: 0
- Overall titles: 0 – (56th in 2023)
- Discipline titles: 0
- Updated on 28 March 2023

Simone Mocellini (born 5 May 1998) is an Italian cross-country skier. He obtained his first World Cup podium in December 2022 placing second in the sprint event in Beitostølen, Norway. He also placed second in the sprint in the Val di Fiemme round of the 2022–23 Tour de Ski.

== Cross-country skiing results ==
All results are sourced from the International Ski Federation (FIS).

=== World Championships ===
Year	Age	15 km individual	30 km skiathlon	50 km mass start	Sprint	4 × 10 km relay	Team sprint
2021	22	—	—	—	50	—	—
2023	24	—	—	—	16	—	—

=== World Cup ===
==== Season standings ====
Season	Age	Discipline standings			Ski Tour standings
Season	Age	Overall	Distance	Sprint	Tour de Ski
2022	23	121	—	69	—
2023	24	56	NC	24	DNF

==== Individual podiums ====
- 2 podiums – (1 WC, 1 SWC)

No.	Season	Date	Location	Race	Level	Place
1	2022–23	9 December 2022	Beitostølen, Norway	1.3 km Sprint C	World Cup	2nd
2	2022–23	6 January 2023	Val di Fiemme, Italy	1.3 km Sprint C	Stage World Cup	3rd
