= Delphine Claudel =

French cross-country skier (born 1996)

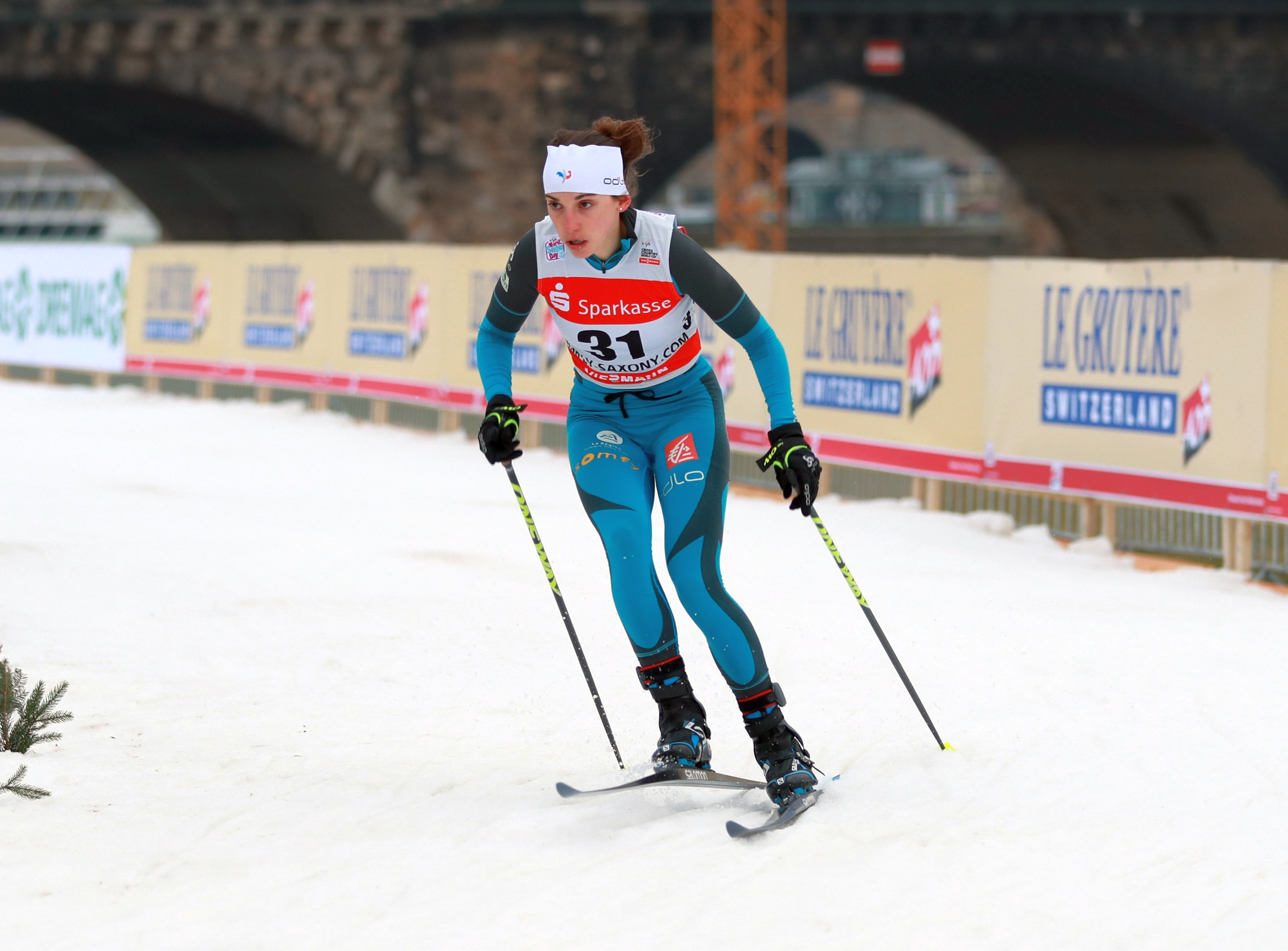
- Claudel in 2018

Personal information
- Nationality: France
- Born: 23 March 1996 (age 30) Remiremont, France

Sport
- Sport: Skiing
- Club: SC La Bressaude

World Cup career
- Seasons: 8 – (2017–present)
- Indiv. starts: 105
- Indiv. podiums: 6
- Indiv. wins: 1
- Team starts: 8
- Team podiums: 0
- Overall titles: 0 – (21st in 2022, 2023)
- Discipline titles: 0
- Updated on 11 February 2024

Delphine Claudel (born 23 March 1996) is a French cross-country skier. She competed in the women's 10 kilometre freestyle at the 2018 Winter Olympics. She competed at the 2022 Winter Olympics, in Women's 30 kilometre freestyle, Women's 15 kilometre skiathlon, and Women's 4 × 5 kilometre relay.

== Cross-country skiing results ==
All results are sourced from the International Ski Federation (FIS).

=== Olympic Games ===
| Year | Age | 10 km individual | 15 km skiathlon | 30 km mass start | Sprint | 4 × 5 km relay | Team sprint |
|---|---|---|---|---|---|---|---|
| 2018 | 21 | 57 | — | — | — | 12 | — |
| 2022 | 25 | — | 9 | 7 | — | 12 | — |

=== World Championships ===
| Year | Age | 10 km individual | 15 km skiathlon | 30 km mass start | Sprint | 4 × 5 km relay | Team sprint |
|---|---|---|---|---|---|---|---|
| 2019 | 22 | — | 31 | — | 35 | 8 | — |
| 2021 | 24 | 22 | 7 | 17 | — | — | — |
| 2023 | 26 | 23 | 10 | — | — | 6 | — |

=== World Cup ===
==== Season standings ====
| Season | Age | Discipline standings | | | | Ski Tour standings | | | |
| Season | Age | Overall | Distance | Sprint | U23 | Nordic Opening | Tour de Ski | Ski Tour 2020 | World Cup Final |
|---|---|---|---|---|---|---|---|---|---|
| 2017 | 20 | NC | NC | NC | NC | — | — | —N/a | — |
| 2018 | 21 | NC | NC | NC | NC | DNF | DNF | —N/a | — |
| 2019 | 22 | 69 | 52 | 53 | 11 | — | DNF | —N/a | 49 |
| 2020 | 23 | 32 | 26 | 67 | —N/a | — | 23 | 16 | —N/a |
| 2021 | 24 | 26 | 23 | NC | —N/a | 43 | 16 | —N/a | —N/a |
| 2022 | 25 | 21 | 14 | NC | —N/a | —N/a | 11 | —N/a | —N/a |
| 2023 | 26 | 21 | 13 | 115 | —N/a | —N/a | 10 | —N/a | —N/a |
| 2024 | 27 | 12 | 12 | 66 | —N/a | —N/a | 10 | —N/a | —N/a |

==== Individual podiums ====
- 1 victory – (1 SWC)
- 6 podiums – (2 WC, 4 SWC)

| No. | Season | Date | Location | Race | Level | Place |
|---|---|---|---|---|---|---|
| 1 | 2020–21 | 10 January 2021 | Val di Fiemme, Italy | 10 km Mass Start F | Stage World Cup | 3rd |
| 2 | 2021–22 | 4 January 2022 | Val di Fiemme, Italy | 10 km Mass Start F | Stage World Cup | 3rd |
| 3 | 2022–23 | 8 January 2023 | Val di Fiemme, Italy | 10 km Mass Start F | Stage World Cup | 1st |
| 4 | 2022–23 | 27 January 2023 | Les Rousses, France | 10 km Individual F | World Cup | 2nd |
| 5 | 2023–24 | 7 January 2024 | Val di Fiemme, Italy | 10 km Mass Start F | Stage World Cup | 3rd |
| 6 | 2023–24 | 9 February 2024 | Canmore, Canada | 15 km Mass Start F | World Cup | 2nd |
