= William Poromaa =

Swedish cross-country skier (born 2000)

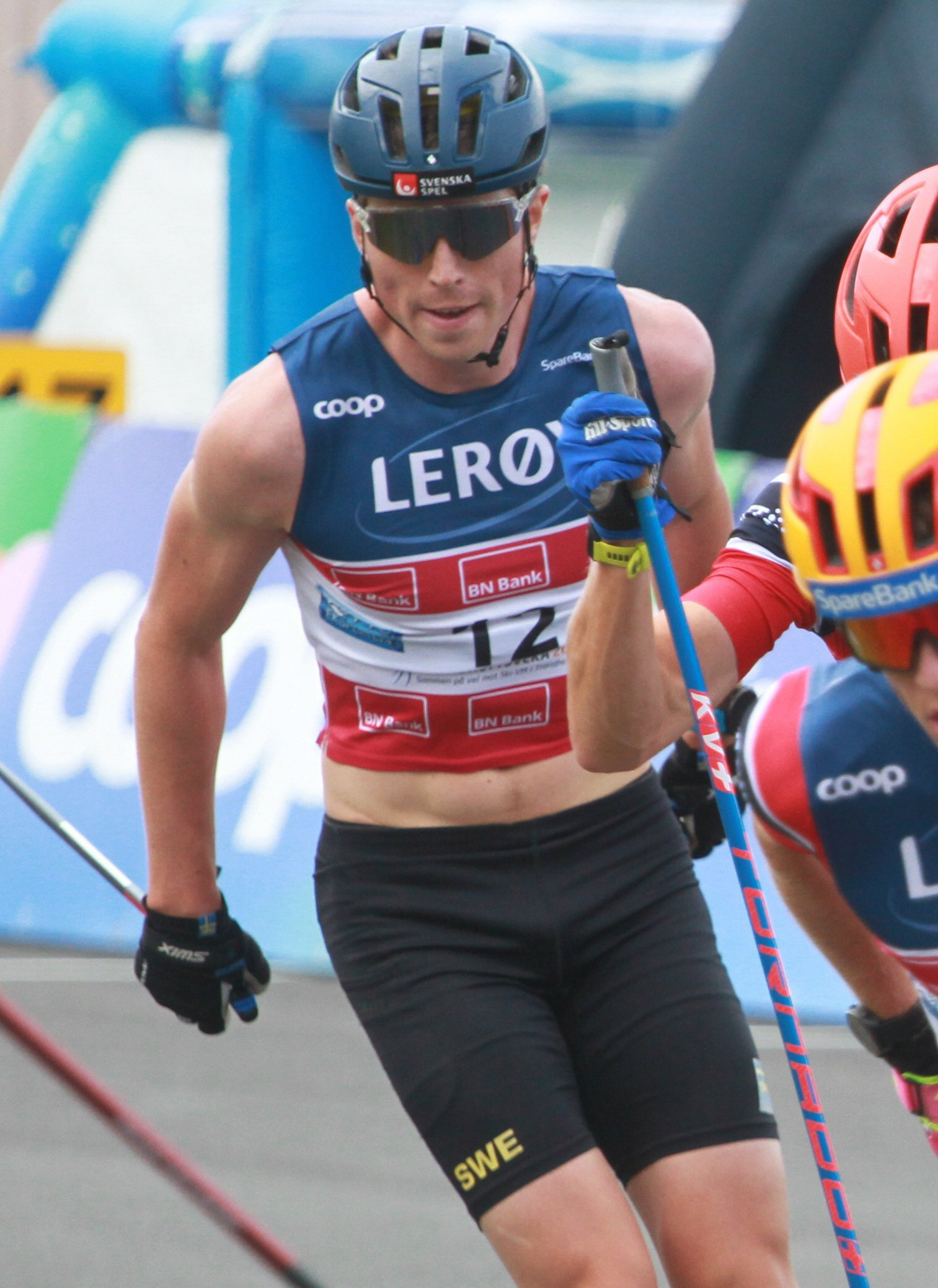
- Poromaa in 2024

Personal information
- Full name: Bengt William Poromaa
- Nationality: Sweden
- Born: 23 December 2000 (age 25) Gällivare, Sweden

Sport
- Sport: Skiing
- Club: Åsarna IK

World Cup career
- Seasons: 6 – (2019–present)
- Indiv. starts: 55
- Indiv. podiums: 6
- Indiv. wins: 1
- Team starts: 6
- Team podiums: 2
- Team wins: 1
- Overall titles: 0 – (13th in 2023)
- Discipline titles: 0
Medal record
Men's cross-country skiing
Representing Sweden
World Championships
Silver medal – second place	2025 Trondheim	50 km freestyle
Bronze medal – third place	2023 Planica	50 km classical
Bronze medal – third place	2025 Trondheim	4 × 7.5 km relay
- Updated on 26 January 2024

William Poromaa (born 23 December 2000) is a Swedish cross-country skier who competes internationally.

He competed at the FIS Nordic World Ski Championships 2021 in Oberstdorf, where he placed fourth in the relay with the Swedish team.

== Personal life ==
Poromaa is a son of former cross-country skiers Anette Fanqvist and Larry Poromaa. Poromaa is of Finnish descent through his paternal grandmother.

== Cross-country skiing results ==
All results are sourced from the International Ski Federation (FIS).

=== Olympic Games ===
Year	Age	Individual	Skiathlon	50 km mass start	Sprint	Relay	Team sprint
2022	21	10	6	9^{[a]}	—	4	4
2026	25	20	12	—	—	10	—

^{a} Distance reduced to 30 km due to weather conditions.

=== World Championships ===
- 3 medals – (1 silver, 2 bronze)

Year	Age	15 km individual	30 km skiathlon	50 km mass start	Sprint	4 × 10 km relay	Team sprint
2021	20	9	9	12	—	4	—
2023	22	5	5	Bronze	—	6	—
2025	24	6	8	Silver	—	Bronze	—

=== World Cup ===
==== Season standings ====
Season	Age	Discipline standings				Ski Tour standings			
Season	Age	Overall	Distance	Sprint	U23	Nordic Opening	Tour de Ski	Ski Tour 2020	World Cup Final
2019	18	NC	NC	—	NC	—	—	—N/a	—
2020	19	NC	NC	—	NC	—	—	—	—N/a
2021	20	35	27	83	4	17	23	—N/a	—N/a
2022	21	35	20	—	3rd place, bronze medalist(s)	—N/a	—	—N/a	—N/a
2023	22	13	7	95	2nd place, silver medalist(s)	—N/a	24	—N/a	—N/a
2024	23	14	13	95	—N/a	—N/a	14	—N/a	—N/a
2025	24	15	10	116	—N/a	—N/a	13	—N/a	—N/a

==== Individual podiums ====
- 1 victory – (1 WC)
- 7 podiums – (6 WC, 1 SWC)

No.	Season	Date	Location	Race	Level	Place
1	2021–22	27 February 2022	Lahti, Finland	15 km Individual C	World Cup	3rd
2	2022–23	27 January 2023	Les Rousses, France	10 km Individual F	World Cup	3rd
3	2022–23	29 January 2023	Les Rousses, France	20 km Mass Start C	World Cup	3rd
4	2022–23	26 March 2023	Lahti, Finland	20 km Mass Start C	World Cup	3rd
5	2023–24	6 January 2024	Val di Fiemme, Italy	15 km Mass Start C	Stage World Cup	2nd
6	2024–25	19 January 2025	Les Rousses, France	20 km Mass Start C	World Cup	1st
7	2024–25	15 March 2025	Oslo, Norway	20 km Individual C	World Cup	2nd

==== Team podiums ====
- 1 victory – (1 RL)
- 2 podiums – (2 RL)

No.	Season	Date	Location	Race	Level	Place	Teammates
1	2022–23	11 December 2022	Beitostølen, Norway	4 × 5 km Mixed Relay C/F	World Cup	3rd	Dahlqvist / Karlsson / Halfvarsson
2	2023–24	26 January 2024	Goms, Switzerland	4 × 5 km Mixed Relay C/F	World Cup	1st	Karlsson / Burman / Svahn
