= Kerttu Niskanen =

Finnish cross-country skier (born 1988)

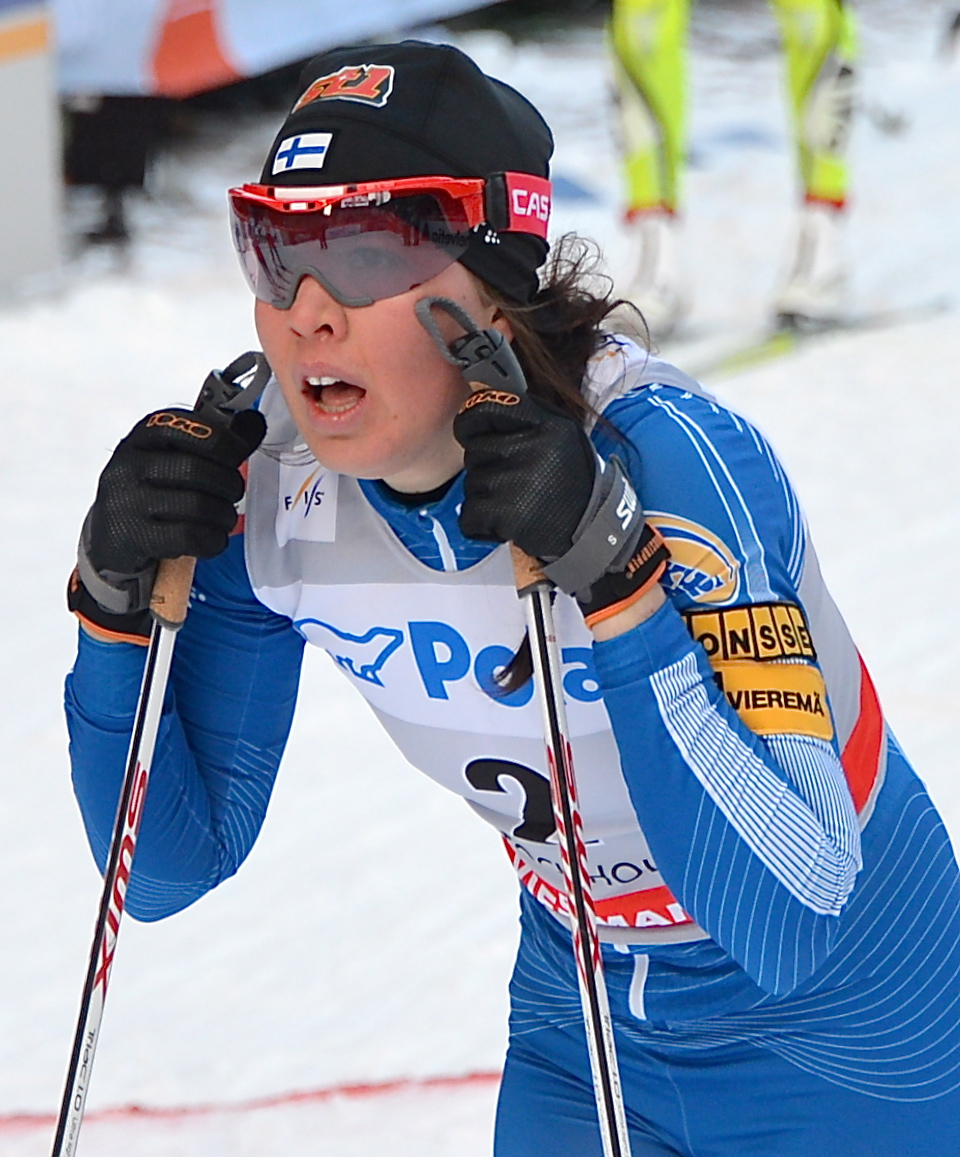
- Niskanen in 2013

Personal information
- Full name: Kerttu Elina Niskanen
- Nationality: Finland
- Born: 13 June 1988 (age 38) Oulu, Finland

Sport
- Sport: Skiing
- Club: Vieremän Koitto

World Cup career
- Seasons: 19 – (2008–2026)
- Indiv. starts: 317
- Indiv. podiums: 27
- Indiv. wins: 8
- Team starts: 18
- Team podiums: 8
- Team wins: 1
- Overall titles: 0 – (3rd in 2023)
- Discipline titles: 1 – (DI in 2023)
Medal record
Women's cross-country skiing
Representing Finland
Event	1st	2nd	3rd
Olympic Games	0	3	2
World Championships	0	0	2
Total	0	3	4
Olympic Games
Silver medal – second place	2014 Sochi	Team sprint
Silver medal – second place	2014 Sochi	4 × 5 km relay
Silver medal – second place	2022 Beijing	10 km classical
Bronze medal – third place	2022 Beijing	30 km freestyle
Bronze medal – third place	2026 Milano Cortina	4 × 7.5 km relay
World Championships
Bronze medal – third place	2015 Falun	4 × 5 km relay
Bronze medal – third place	2017 Lahti	4 × 5 km relay
U23 World Championships
Gold medal – first place	2010 Hinterzarten	10 km classical
Gold medal – first place	2011 Otepää	Individual sprint
Bronze medal – third place	2009 Praz de Lys-Sommand	Individual sprint
Bronze medal – third place	2011 Otepää	15 km skiathlon
Junior World Championships
Bronze medal – third place	2007 Tarvisio	4 × 3.33 km relay
Bronze medal – third place	2008 Mals	4 × 3.33 km relay
- Updated on 31 January 2025

Kerttu Elina Niskanen (born 13 June 1988) is a Finnish cross-country skier. She is a five-time Olympic medalist.

== Career ==
At the FIS Nordic World Ski Championships 2011 in Oslo, her first senior WCH, Niskanen finished eighth in the 10 km classical event. To date, her best individual World Championship results are 4th places in the skiathlon and 30 km classical in the FIS Nordic World Ski Championships 2015 in Falun.

At the 2014 Winter Olympics in Sochi, she won two silver medals as a member of team Finland: in 4 × 5 km relay and in team sprint. She also finished fourth in 30 km freestyle.

Niskanen also has two bronze medals from World Championship 4 x 5 km relays in 2015 and 2017. She has won three World Cup competitions and has been on the podium ten times in total. Her best result in the Tour de Ski is 5th, which she achieved three times in 2014, 2016, and 2022.

She was forced to sit out the 2021 World Championships after a fracture was discovered in her left fibula after a World Cup race in Falun, Sweden, in January 2021. Despite the sudden, sharp pain from the fracture, Niskanen finished the race in 12th place. This was her final race of the season.

During the 2021/22 season, Niskanen took her first win and podium in three years when she won the 10 km classical Stage World Cup race in Lenzerheide, Switzerland. Following the win, she became the Tour de Ski leader for the first time in her career. Niskanen eventually finished fifth in the tournament.

At the 2022 Beijing Olympics, Niskanen won her first individual Olympic medal, a silver in the 10 km classical event, losing the gold medal to Therese Johaug of Norway by only 0.4 seconds. She also placed fourth in the skiathlon, which was already her fourth 4th-place finish in individual Olympic or World Championship competitions. The team events also resulted in fourth place for Niskanen; she skied the 3rd leg in the 4 x 5 km relay and the first, third, and fifth legs of the team sprint. In both events, Finland was a strong medal contender and missed out on medals by only a couple of seconds.

In the last event of the Olympics, the 30 km freestyle held in grueling, windy conditions, Niskanen won her second individual medal, this time a bronze. For most of the race, Niskanen, whose stronger style is often considered classic, skied in fourth place at the front of a chase group. In the final kilometre, however, Niskanen overtook Ebba Andersson of Sweden, who at 25 km had been half a minute ahead of her, seizing the bronze as the fastest of the chasers.

Kerttu Niskanen's younger brother Iivo is also a cross-country skier and three-time Olympic champion. On 29 December 2021, the siblings made history as they won the 10 and 15 km World Cup events in Lenzerheide only hours apart. At the finale of the 2021/22 season, they shared a World Cup podium for the first time, having taken part in the mixed relay event where Finland placed second. Between them, the Niskanen siblings have won nine Olympic and five World Championship medals.

Niskanen placed fifth in 20 kilometre skiathlon at the 2026 Winter Olympics.

== Cross-country skiing results ==
All results are sourced from the International Ski Federation (FIS).

=== Olympic Games ===
- 4 medals – (3 silver, 1 bronze)

Year	Age	10 km individual	15/20 km skiathlon	30/50 km mass start	Sprint	4 × 5/7.5 km relay	Team sprint
2014	25	8	7	4	—	Silver	Silver
2018	29	—	16	6	23	4	—
2022	33	Silver	4	Bronze	—	4	4
2026	37	29	5	7	—	Bronze	—

=== World Championships ===
- 2 medals – (2 bronze)

Year	Age	10 km individual	15/20 km skiathlon	30/50 km mass start	Sprint	4 × 5/7.5 km relay	Team sprint
2011	22	8	—	—	—	—	—
2013	24	—	12	7	9	5	—
2015	26	8	4	4	7	Bronze	—
2017	28	6	—	DNF	—	Bronze	5
2019	30	22	—	—	—	—	—
2023	34	9	5	6	—	4	—

=== World Cup ===
- 1 title – (1 distance)

Season	Discipline
2023	Distance

==== Season standings ====
Season	Age	Discipline standings			Ski Tour standings				
Season	Age	Overall	Distance	Sprint	Nordic Opening	Tour de Ski	Ski Tour 2020	World Cup Final	Ski Tour Canada
2008	19	NC	NC	—	—N/a	—	—N/a	—	—N/a
2009	20	67	45	55	—N/a	—	—N/a	DNF	—N/a
2010	21	72	57	58	—	—	—N/a	DNF	—N/a
2011	22	36	30	40	—	DNF	—N/a	19	—N/a
2012	23	32	27	39	25	16	—N/a	—	—N/a
2013	24	11	12	21	12	17	—N/a	5	—N/a
2014	25	5	3rd place, bronze medalist(s)	28	23	5	—N/a	4	—N/a
2015	26	14	12	41	9	DNF	—N/a	—N/a	—N/a
2016	27	9	6	31	5	5	—N/a	—N/a	7
2017	28	8	8	37	14	6	—N/a	11	—N/a
2018	29	10	9	42	19	6	—N/a	11	—N/a
2019	30	42	21	79	—	—	—N/a	34	—N/a
2020	31	15	11	43	12	11	DNF	—N/a	—N/a
2021	32	28	24	65	9	DNF	—N/a	—N/a	—N/a
2022	33	7	6	25	—N/a	5	—N/a	—N/a	—N/a
2023	34	3rd place, bronze medalist(s)	1st place, gold medalist(s)	22	—N/a	2nd place, silver medalist(s)	—N/a	—N/a	—N/a
2024	35	5	4	17	—N/a	3rd place, bronze medalist(s)	—N/a	—N/a	—N/a
2025	36	3rd place, bronze medalist(s)	4	32	—N/a	4	—N/a	—N/a	—N/a

==== Individual podiums ====
- 8 victories – (4 WC, 4 SWC)
- 28 podiums – (15 WC, 13 SWC)

No.	Season	Date	Location	Race	Level	Place
1	2012–13	20 March 2013	Stockholm, Sweden	1.1 km Sprint C	Stage World Cup	3rd
2	2013–14	1 January 2014	Lenzerheide, Switzerland	10 km Mass Start C	Stage World Cup	1st
3	2013–14	9 March 2014	Oslo, Norway	30 km Mass Start C	World Cup	3rd
4	2013–14	15 March 2014	Falun, Sweden	7.5 km + 7.5 km Skiathlon C/F	Stage World Cup	3rd
5	2014–15	13 December 2014	Davos, Switzerland	10 km Individual C	World Cup	3rd
6	2015–16	29 November 2015	Ruka, Finland	10 km Pursuit C	Stage World Cup	3rd
7	2016–17	8 January 2017	Val di Fiemme, Italy	9 km Pursuit F	Stage World Cup	3rd
8	2016–17	12 March 2017	Oslo, Norway	30 km Mass Start C	World Cup	3rd
9	2018–19	17 February 2019	Cogne, Italy	10 km Individual C	World Cup	1st
10	2021–22	29 December 2021	Lenzerheide, Switzerland	10 km Individual C	Stage World Cup	1st
11	2022–23	10 December 2022	Beitostølen, Norway	10 km Individual C	World Cup	1st
12	2022–23	1 January 2023	Val Müstair, Switzerland	10 km Pursuit C	Stage World Cup	2nd
13	2022–23	7 January 2023	Val di Fiemme, Italy	15 km Mass Start C	Stage World Cup	3rd
14	2022–23	31 December 2022 – 8 January 2023	(Switzerland) (Germany) (Italy) Tour de Ski	Overall Standings	World Cup	2nd
15	2022–23	29 January 2023	Les Rousses, France	20 km Mass Start C	World Cup	2nd
16	2022–23	17 March 2023	Falun, Sweden	10 km Individual C	World Cup	1st
17	2023–24	31 December 2023	Toblach, Italy	10 km Individual C	Stage World Cup	1st
18	2023–24	4 January 2024	Davos, Switzerland	20 km Pursuit C	Stage World Cup	1st
19	2023–24	30 December 2023 – 7 January 2024	(Italy) (Switzerland) Tour de Ski	Overall Standings	World Cup	3rd
20	2023–24	20 January 2024	Oberhof, Germany	20 km Mass Start C	World Cup	3rd
21	2023–24	11 February 2024	Canmore, Canada	20 km Mass Start C	World Cup	2nd
22	2023–24	2 March 2024	Lahti, Finland	20 km Individual C	World Cup	3rd
23	2023–24	16 March 2024	Falun, Sweden	10 km Individual C	World Cup	1st
24	2024–25	15 December 2024	Davos, Switzerland	20 km Individual C	World Cup	2nd
25	2024–25	29 December 2024	Toblach, Italy	15 km Mass Start C	Stage World Cup	2nd
26	2024–25	31 December 2024	Toblach, Italy	20 km Individual F	Stage World Cup	3rd
27	2024–25	1 January 2025	Toblach, Italy	15 km Pursuit C	Stage World Cup	3rd
28	2024–25	2 February 2025	Cogne, Italy	10 km Individual F	World Cup	3rd

==== Team podiums ====
- 1 victory – (1 TS)
- 8 podiums – (7 RL, 1 TS)

No.	Season	Date	Location	Race	Level	Place	Teammates
1	2012–13	20 January 2013	La Clusaz, France	4 × 5 km Relay C/F	World Cup	2nd	Kyllönen / Saarinen / Roponen
2	2013–14	8 December 2013	Lillehammer, Norway	4 × 5 km Relay C/F	World Cup	2nd	Saarinen / Kyllönen / Lähteenmäki
3	2015–16	6 December 2015	Lillehammer, Norway	4 × 5 km Relay C/F	World Cup	2nd	Pärmäkoski / Mononen / Kyllönen
4	2015–16	24 January 2016	Nové Město, Czech Republic	4 × 5 km Relay C/F	World Cup	3rd	Kyllönen / Pärmäkoski / Roponen
5	2019–20	1 March 2020	Lahti, Finland	4 × 5 km Relay C/F	World Cup	2nd	Matintalo / Mononen / Pärmäkoski
6	2020–21	24 January 2021	Lahti, Finland	4 × 5 km Relay C/F	World Cup	3rd	Matintalo / Mononen / Pärmäkoski
7	2021–22	13 March 2022	Falun, Sweden	4 × 5 km Mixed Relay F	World Cup	2nd	Hyvärinen / I. Niskanen / Pärmäkoski
8	2024–25	31 January 2025	Cogne, Italy	6 × 1.3 km Team Sprint C	World Cup	1st	Joensuu

== See also ==
- List of Olympic medalist families
