= Tiril Udnes Weng =

Norwegian cross-country skier (born 1996)

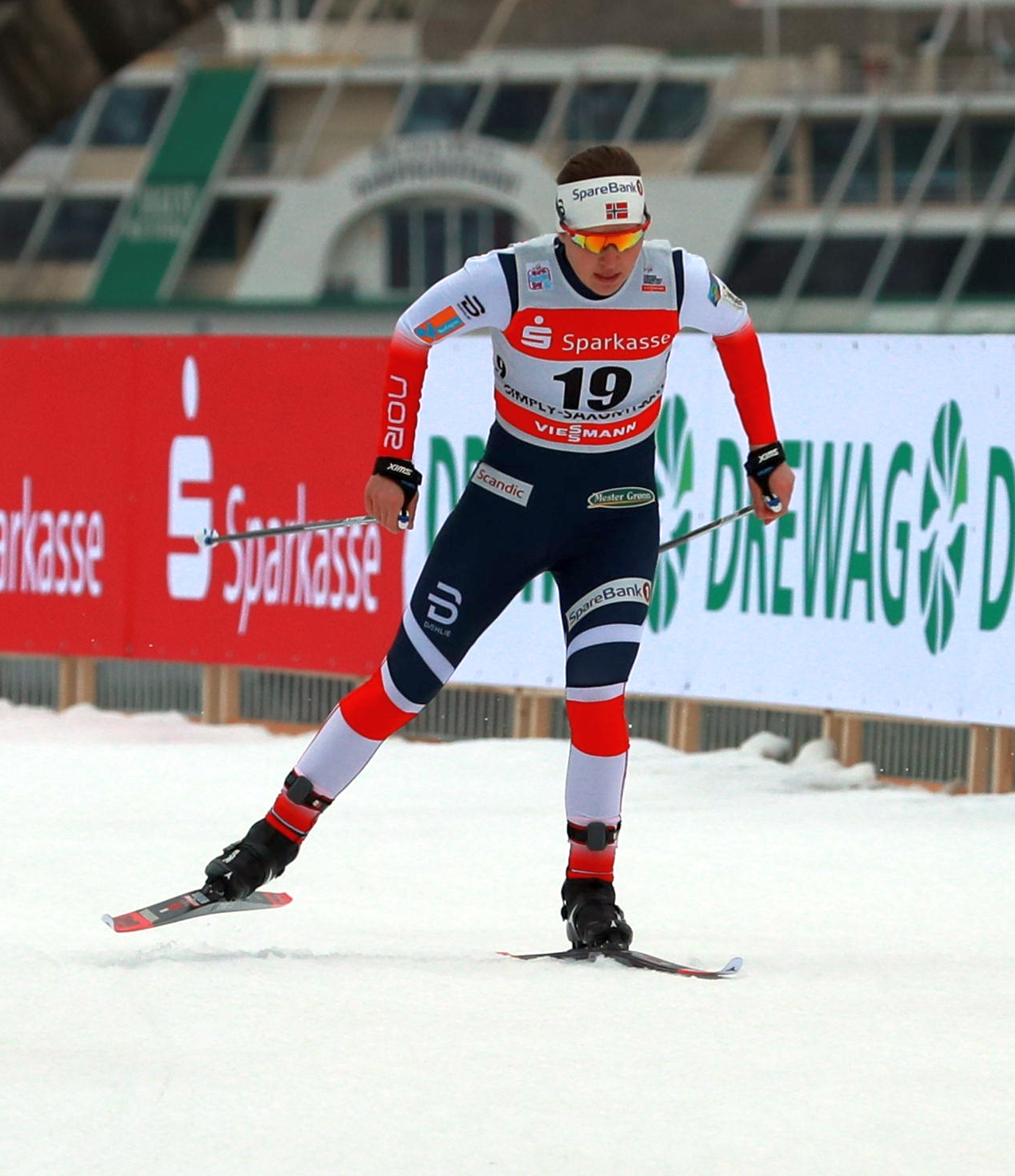
- Udnes Weng in January, 2018

Personal information
- Nationality: Norway
- Born: 29 September 1996 (age 29) Nes, Akershus, Norway

Sport
- Sport: Skiing
- Club: Nes Ski

World Cup career
- Seasons: 10 – (2015–present)
- Indiv. starts: 118
- Indiv. podiums: 11
- Indiv. wins: 1
- Team starts: 12
- Team podiums: 6
- Team wins: 2
- Overall titles: 1 – (2023)
- Discipline titles: 0
Medal record
Women's cross-country skiing
Representing Norway
World Championships
Gold medal – first place	2021 Oberstdorf	4 × 5 km relay
Gold medal – first place	2023 Planica	4 × 5 km relay
Silver medal – second place	2023 Planica	Team sprint
U23 World Championships
Gold medal – first place	2018 Goms	Individual sprint
Silver medal – second place	2017 Park City	10 km freestyle
Silver medal – second place	2019 Lahti	Individual sprint
Bronze medal – third place	2019 Lahti	10 km freestyle
Junior World Championships
Gold medal – first place	2015 Almaty	4 × 3.33 km relay
Silver medal – second place	2016 Râșnov	4 × 2.5 km relay
Bronze medal – third place	2014 Val di Fiemme	4 × 3.33 km relay
Bronze medal – third place	2016 Râșnov	10 km freestyle
- Updated on 28 January 2024

Tiril Udnes Weng (born 29 September 1996) is a Norwegian cross-country skier, who won overall World Cup in 2023

== Career ==
At the 2014, 2015 and 2016 Junior World Championships she won two bronze medals (one in relay), one silver and one gold medal (both in relay). As an U23 junior she competed at the 2017, 2018 and 2019 Junior World Championships, bagging one bronze, two silver and one gold medal, all in individual races.

She made her World Cup debut in March 2015 in Drammen, and collected her first World Cup points in January 2017 in Toblach with a 21st place in the sprint. She broke the top 20 for the first time in January 2018 in Seefeld, finishing 11th, following up with a 9th place in March in Drammen. In February 2019 in Lahti she reached the sprint final for the first time, finishing 6th. She also made her World Championships debut in 2019, finishing 15th in the sprint.

Weng represents the sports club Nes Ski. She is the twin sister of Lotta Udnes Weng and a third cousin of Heidi Weng.

== Cross-country skiing results ==
All results are sourced from the International Ski Federation (FIS).

=== Olympic Games ===
Year	Age	10 km individual	15 km skiathlon	30 km mass start	Sprint	4 × 5 km relay	Team sprint
2022	25	21	—	14	9	5	8

=== World Championships ===
- 3 medals – (2 gold, 1 silver)

Year	Age	10 km individual	15 km skiathlon	30 km mass start	Sprint	4 × 5 km relay	Team sprint
2019	22	—	—	—	15	—	—
2021	24	19	—	7	6	Gold	6
2023	26	12	—	9	6	Gold	Silver

=== World Cup ===
==== Season titles ====
- 1 title – (1 overall)

Season
Season	Discipline
2023	Overall

==== Season standings ====
Season	Age	Discipline standings				Ski Tour standings				
Season	Age	Overall	Distance	Sprint	U23	Nordic Opening	Tour de Ski	Ski Tour 2020	World Cup Final	Ski Tour Canada
2015	18	NC	NC	NC	NC	—	—	—N/a	—N/a	—N/a
2016	19	NC	—	NC	NC	—	—	—N/a	—N/a	—
2017	20	100	51	66	18	—	—	—N/a	—	—N/a
2018	21	33	42	24	7	33	DNF	—N/a	12	—N/a
2019	22	18	28	18	2nd place, silver medalist(s)	19	16	—N/a	18	—N/a
2020	23	13	17	12	—N/a	7	10	8	—N/a	—N/a
2021	24	26	30	31	—N/a	17	—	—N/a	—N/a	—N/a
2022	25	16	16	11	—N/a	—N/a	10	—N/a	—N/a	—N/a
2023	26	1st place, gold medalist(s)	3rd place, bronze medalist(s)	3rd place, bronze medalist(s)	—N/a	—N/a	3rd place, bronze medalist(s)	—N/a	—N/a	—N/a
2024	27	37	33	22	—N/a	—N/a	—	—N/a	—N/a	—N/a

==== Individual podiums ====
- 1 victory – (1 SWC)
- 11 podiums – (8 WC, 3 SWC)

No.	Season	Date	Location	Race	Level	Place
1	2021–22	3 December 2021	Lillehammer, Norway	1.6 km Sprint F	World Cup	3rd
2	2022–23	25 November 2022	Rukatunturi, Finland	1.4 km Sprint C	World Cup	3rd
3	2022–23	27 November 2022	Rukatunturi, Finland	20 km Pursuit F	World Cup	3rd
4	2022–23	3 December 2022	Lillehammer, Norway	1.6 km Sprint F	World Cup	3rd
5	2022–23	4 December 2022	Lillehammer, Norway	20 km Mass Start C	World Cup	2nd
6	2022–23	1 January 2023	Val Müstair, Switzerland	10 km Pursuit C	Stage World Cup	1st
7	2022–23	4 January 2023	Oberstdorf, Germany	20 km Pursuit F	Stage World Cup	3rd
8	2022–23	6 January 2023	Val di Fiemme, Italy	1.3 km Sprint C	Stage World Cup	2nd
9	2022–23	31 December 2022 – 8 January 2022	(Switzerland) (Germany) (Italy) Tour de Ski	Overall Standings	World Cup	3rd
10	2022–23	14 March 2023	Drammen, Norway	1.2 km Sprint C	World Cup	3rd
11	2022–23	25 March 2023	Lahti, Finland	1.4 km Sprint C	World Cup	3rd

==== Team podiums ====
- 2 victories – (2 RL)
- 6 podiums – (4 RL, 2 TS)

No.	Season	Date	Location	Race	Level	Place	Teammate(s)
1	2018–19	10 February 2019	Lahti, Finland	6 × 1.4 km Team Sprint C	World Cup	2nd	Falla
2	2019–20	1 March 2020	Lahti, Finland	4 × 5 km Relay C/F	World Cup	1st	Østberg / Johaug / Weng
3	2020–21	24 January 2021	Lahti, Finland	4 × 5 km Relay C/F	World Cup	1st	Johaug / Fossesholm / Weng
4	2021–22	5 December 2021	Lillehammer, Norway	4 × 5 km Relay C/F	World Cup	3rd	Weng / Johaug / Fossesholm
5	2021–22	13 March 2022	Falun, Sweden	12 × 1 km Mixed Team Sprint F	World Cup	2nd	Nyenget
6	2023–24	26 January 2024	Goms, Switzerland	4 × 5 km Mixed Relay C/F	World Cup	3rd	Nyenget / Bergane / Krüger
