= Nadine Fähndrich =

Swiss cross-country skier (born 1995)

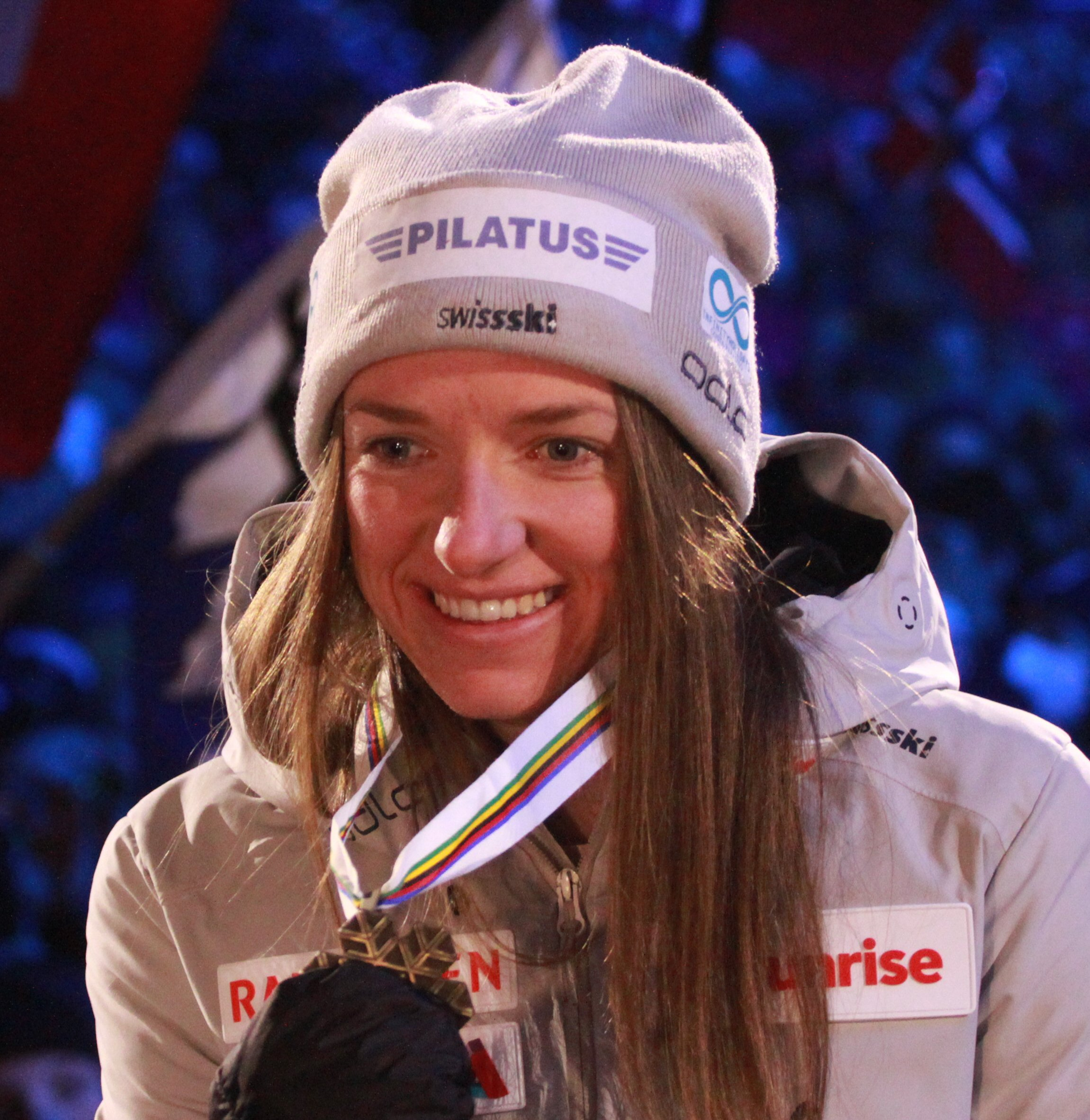

Personal information
- Nationality: Switzerland
- Born: 16 October 1995 (age 30) Schwarzenberg, Switzerland
- Height: 1.69 m (5 ft 7 in)

Sport
- Sport: Skiing
- Club: Skiclub Horw

World Cup career
- Seasons: 11 – (2016–2026)
- Indiv. starts: 214
- Indiv. podiums: 21
- Indiv. wins: 6
- Team starts: 17
- Team podiums: 7
- Team wins: 1
- Overall titles: 0 – (5th in 2023)
- Discipline titles: 0
Medal record
Women's cross-country skiing
Representing Switzerland
Olympic Games
| Silver medal – second place | 2026 Milano Cortina | Team sprint |
World Championships
| Silver medal – second place | 2021 Oberstdorf | Team sprint |
| Bronze medal – third place | 2025 Trondheim | Individual sprint |
| Bronze medal – third place | 2025 Trondheim | Team sprint |
U23 World Championships
| Silver medal – second place | 2016 Râșnov | Individual sprint |
| Silver medal – second place | 2018 Goms | Individual sprint |
| Bronze medal – third place | 2018 Goms | 10 km classical |
- Updated on 22 March 2026

Nadine Fähndrich (born 16 October 1995) is a Swiss cross-country skier who represents Skiclub Horw.

She competed at the FIS Nordic World Ski Championships 2017 in Lahti, Finland.

Den 4 March 2026, she announced her retirement from her career following the end of the 2025–2026 season.

== Cross-country skiing results ==
All results are sourced from the International Ski Federation (FIS).

=== Olympic Games ===
| Year | Age | 10 km individual | 15 km skiathlon | 30 km mass start | Sprint | 4 × 5 km relay | Team sprint |
|---|---|---|---|---|---|---|---|
| 2018 | 22 | — | 27 | — | 20 | 7 | 4 |
| 2022 | 26 | 22 | — | — | 5 | 7 | 7 |
| 2026 | 30 | 16 | — | — | 21 | 7 | Silver |

=== World Championships ===
- 3 medals – (1 silver, 2 bronze)

| Year | Age | 10 km individual | 15 km skiathlon | 30 km mass start | Sprint | 4 × 5 km relay | Team sprint |
|---|---|---|---|---|---|---|---|
| 2017 | 21 | 25 | — | — | 25 | 7 | 7 |
| 2019 | 23 | 5 | — | — | 7 | 10 | 8 |
| 2021 | 25 | — | — | — | 33 | — | Silver |
| 2023 | 27 | 8 | — | — | 9 | 10 | 5 |
| 2025 | 29 | | | | Bronze | | Bronze |

=== World Cup ===
==== Season standings ====
| Season | Age | Discipline standings | | | | Ski Tour standings | | | | |
| Season | Age | Overall | Distance | Sprint | U23 | Nordic Opening | Tour de Ski | Ski Tour 2020 | World Cup Final | Ski Tour Canada |
|---|---|---|---|---|---|---|---|---|---|---|
| 2016 | 20 | 58 | NC | 37 | 10 | — | DNF | —N/a | —N/a | — |
| 2017 | 21 | 35 | 42 | 21 | 3rd place, bronze medalist(s) | 47 | DNF | —N/a | 30 | —N/a |
| 2018 | 22 | 27 | 31 | 21 | 4 | 53 | 19 | —N/a | 28 | —N/a |
| 2019 | 23 | 19 | 25 | 10 | —N/a | 45 | DNF | —N/a | 26 | —N/a |
| 2020 | 24 | 20 | 32 | 7 | —N/a | 24 | DNF | 20 | —N/a | —N/a |
| 2021 | 25 | 10 | 17 | 2nd place, silver medalist(s) | —N/a | 24 | 11 | —N/a | —N/a | —N/a |
| 2022 | 26 | 13 | 20 | 5 | —N/a | —N/a | 18 | —N/a | —N/a | —N/a |
| 2023 | 27 | 5 | 22 | 2nd place, silver medalist(s) | —N/a | —N/a | 22 | —N/a | —N/a | —N/a |
| 2024 | 28 | 18 | 30 | 9 | —N/a | —N/a | DNF | —N/a | —N/a | —N/a |
| 2025 | 29 | 11 | 29 | 2nd place, silver medalist(s) | —N/a | —N/a | 24 | —N/a | —N/a | —N/a |
| 2026 | 30 | 7 | 36 | 3rd place, bronze medalist(s) | —N/a | —N/a | 26 | —N/a | —N/a | —N/a |

==== Individual podiums ====
- 6 victories – (4 WC, 2 SWC)
- 21 podiums – (16 WC, 5 SWC)

| No. | Season | Date | Location | Race | Level | Place |
|---|---|---|---|---|---|---|
| 1 | 2018–19 | 17 February 2019 | Cogne, Italy | 10 km Individual C | World Cup | 2nd |
| 2 | 2019–20 | 22 February 2020 | Trondheim, Norway | 1.5 km Sprint C | Stage World Cup | 3rd |
| 3 | 2019–20 | 4 March 2020 | Konnerud, Norway | 1.2 km Sprint F | World Cup | 2nd |
| 4 | 2020–21 | 19 December 2020 | Dresden, Germany | 1.3 km Sprint F | World Cup | 1st |
| 5 | 2021–22 | 11 December 2021 | Davos, Switzerland | 1.5 km Sprint F | World Cup | 2nd |
| 6 | 2022–23 | 9 December 2022 | Beitostølen, Norway | 1.3 km Sprint C | World Cup | 1st |
| 7 | 2022–23 | 17 December 2022 | Davos, Switzerland | 1.5 km Sprint F | World Cup | 1st |
| 8 | 2022–23 | 31 December 2022 | Val Müstair, Switzerland | 1.5 km Sprint F | Stage World Cup | 1st |
| 9 | 2022–23 | 21 March 2023 | Tallinn, Estonia | 1.4 km Sprint F | World Cup | 3rd |
| 10 | 2023–24 | 28 January 2024 | Goms, Switzerland | 20 km Mass Start F | World Cup | 3rd |
| 11 | 2024–25 | 28 December 2024 | Toblach, Italy | 1.4 km Sprint F | Stage World Cup | 3rd |
| 12 | 2024–25 | 3 January 2025 | Val di Fiemme, Italy | 1.2 km Sprint C | Stage World Cup | 1st |
| 13 | 2024–25 | 1 February 2025 | Cogne, Italy | 1.3 km Sprint C | World Cup | 2nd |
| 14 | 2024–25 | 14 February 2025 | Falun, Sweden | 1.4 km Sprint C | World Cup | 2nd |
| 15 | 2024–25 | 19 March 2025 | Tallinn, Estonia | 1.4 km Sprint F | World Cup | 1st |
| 16 | 2024–25 | 21 March 2025 | (Finland) Lahti, Sweden | 1.5 km Sprint F | World Cup | 3rd |
| 17 | 2025–26 | 13 December 2025 | Davos, Switzerland | 1.2 km Sprint F | World Cup | 3rd |
| 18 | 2025–26 | 3 January 2026 | Val di Fiemme, Italy | 1.2 km Sprint C | Stage World Cup | 2nd |
| 19 | 2025–26 | 24 January 2026 | Goms, Switzerland | 1.5 km Sprint C | World Cup | 3rd |
| 20 | 2025–26 | 28 February 2026 | Falun, Sweden | 1.4 km Sprint F | World Cup | 3rd |
| 21 | 2025–26 | 12 March 2026 | Drammen, Norway | 1.2 km Sprint C | World Cup | 3rd |

==== Team podiums ====
- 1 victory – (1 TS)
- 7 podiums – (6 TS, 1 RL)

| No. | Season | Date | Location | Race | Level | Place | Teammate |
|---|---|---|---|---|---|---|---|
| 1 | 2019–20 | 22 December 2019 | Planica, Slovenia | 6 × 1.2 km Team Sprint F | World Cup | 3rd | van der Graaff |
| 2 | 2019–20 | 12 January 2020 | Dresden, Germany | 12 × 0.65 km Team Sprint F | World Cup | 2nd | van der Graaff |
| 3 | 2020–21 | 20 December 2020 | Dresden, Germany | 12 × 0.65 km Team Sprint F | World Cup | 1st | van der Graaff |
| 4 | 2020–21 | 7 February 2021 | Ulricehamn, Sweden | 6 × 1.5 km Team Sprint F | World Cup | 3rd | van der Graaff |
| 5 | 2024–25 | 13 December 2024 | Davos, Switzerland | 6 × 1.5 km Team Sprint F | World Cup | 3rd | Weber |
| 6 | 2024–25 | 24 January 2025 | Engadin, Switzerland | 4 × 5 km Mixed Relay C/F | World Cup | 3rd | Baumann/Weber/Rüesch |
| 7 | 2024–25 | 22 March 2025 | Lahti, Finland | 6 × 1.5 km Team Sprint F | World Cup | 3rd | Weber |
