= Cross-country skiing at the 2026 Winter Olympics – Women's sprint =

Women's sprint at the XXV Olympic Winter Games
- Cross-country skiing
- Venue: Cross country and biathlon center Fabio Canal, Tesero
- Date: 10 February 2026
- Competitors: 89 from 35 nations
- Winning time: 4:03.05

Medalists
1st place, gold medalist(s)		Linn Svahn	Sweden
2nd place, silver medalist(s)		Jonna Sundling	Sweden
3rd place, bronze medalist(s)		Maja Dahlqvist	Sweden

The women's sprint competition in cross-country skiing at the 2026 Winter Olympics was held on 10 February, over a 1.585-kilometre (0.985 mi) course at the Cross country and biathlon center Fabio Canal in Tesero. The Swedish athletes swept the podium, with Linn Svahn becoming the champion, Jonna Sundling finishing second, and Maja Dahlqvist third. For Svahn, this was the first Olympic medal.

== Background ==
All three 2022 medalists, the champion Jonna Sundling, the silver medalist Maja Dahlqvist, and the bronze medalist Jessie Diggins, qualified for the Olympics. Dahlqvist was leading sprint standings and Diggins overall standings of the 2025–26 FIS Cross-Country World Cup before the Olympics. Sundling was the 2025 world champion in sprint.

== Results ==
=== Qualifying ===
The qualifying was held at 09:15. The fastest thirty athletes qualified (Q) for the finals.

Rank	Bib	Athlete	Country	Time	Deficit	Note
1	8	Linn Svahn	Sweden	3:36.21		Q
2	24	Jonna Sundling	Sweden	3:37.24	+1.03	Q
3	28	Johanna Hagström	Sweden	3:38.85	+2.64	Q
4	6	Jasmi Joensuu	Finland	3:39.64	+3.43	Q
5	4	Nadine Fähndrich	Switzerland	3:39.87	+3.66	Q
6	11	Nicole Monsorno	Italy	3:39.97	+3.76	Q
7	18	Maja Dahlqvist	Sweden	3:41.47	+5.26	Q
8	17	Caterina Ganz	Italy	3:42.13	+5.92	Q
9	20	Federica Cassol	Italy	3:42.48	+6.27	Q
10	26	Johanna Matintalo	Finland	3:42.80	+6.59	Q
11	23	Mélissa Gal	France	3:43.39	+7.18	Q
12	9	Milla Grosberghaugen Andreassen	Norway	3:44.18	+7.97	Q
13	22	Jasmin Kähärä	Finland	3:45.12	+8.91	Q
14	31	Julie Bjervig Drivenes	Norway	3:45.25	+9.04	Q
15	27	Amanda Saari	Finland	3:45.34	+9.13	Q
16	14	Kristine Stavås Skistad	Norway	3:45.48	+9.27	Q
17	12	Laura Gimmler	Germany	3:45.81	+9.60	Q
18	36	Julie Pierrel	France	3:46.22	+10.01	Q
19	2	Iris De Martin Pinter	Italy	3:46.30	+10.09	Q
20	30	Jessie Diggins	United States	3:46.67	+10.46	Q
21	19	Sofie Krehl	Germany	3:46.81	+10.60	Q
22	25	Ingrid Bergene Aabrekk	Norway	3:46.94	+10.73	Q
23	10	Anja Weber	Switzerland	3:47.27	+11.06	Q
24	16	Coletta Rydzek	Germany	3:47.80	+11.59	Q
25	15	Kateřina Janatová	Czech Republic	3:47.84	+11.63	Q
26	5	Sammy Smith	United States	3:47.97	+11.76	Q
27	47	Heidi Bucher	Austria	3:48.73	+12.52	Q
28	29	Julia Kern	United States	3:48.77	+12.56	Q
29	13	Lea Fischer	Switzerland	3:48.82	+12.61	Q
30	41	Lauren Jortberg	United States	3:49.23	+13.02	Q
31	3	Alina Meier	Switzerland	3:50.85	+14.64	
32	48	Anna Pryce	Great Britain	3:50.88	+14.67	
33	33	Monika Skinder	Poland	3:51.10	+14.89	
34	43	Justine Gaillard	France	3:51.37	+15.16	
35	7	Magdalena Scherz	Austria	3:51.41	+15.20	
36	34	Dariya Nepryaeva	Individual Neutral Athletes	3:51.60	+15.39	
37	39	Izabela Marcisz	Poland	3:51.73	+15.52	
38	49	Clémence Didierlaurent	France	3:51.93	+15.72	
39	50	Katherine Sauerbrey	Germany	3:52.42	+16.21	
40	1	Mariel Merlii Pulles	Estonia	3:52.44	+16.23	
41	44	Anna Marie Jaklová	Czech Republic	3:52.91	+16.70	
42	45	Aleksandra Kołodziej	Poland	3:54.37	+18.16	
43	51	Jasmine Drolet	Canada	3:54.63	+18.42	
44	42	Alison Mackie	Canada	3:55.46	+19.25	
45	40	Sonjaa Schmidt	Canada	3:55.55	+19.34	
46	32	Barbora Antošová	Czech Republic	3:56.07	+19.86	
47	21	Gina del Rio	Andorra	3:56.85	+20.64	
48	38	Hanna Karaliova	Individual Neutral Athletes	3:57.25	+21.04	
49	37	Tereza Beranová	Czech Republic	4:00.30	+24.09	
50	57	Ellen Søhol Lie	Australia	4:01.65	+25.44	
51	35	Olivia Bouffard-Nesbitt	Canada	4:01.89	+25.68	
52	59	Sophia Tsu Velicer	Chinese Taipei	4:02.29	+26.08	
53	52	Dilnigar Ilhamjan	China	4:02.99	+26.78	
54	46	Teesi Tuul	Estonia	4:03.73	+27.52	
55	55	Darya Ryazhko	Kazakhstan	4:04.22	+28.01	
56	53	Teiloora Ojaste	Estonia	4:06.40	+30.19	
57	65	Lucija Medja	Slovenia	4:06.67	+30.46	
58	58	Anna Melnik	Kazakhstan	4:07.23	+31.02	
59	62	Anastasiia Nikon	Ukraine	4:07.37	+31.16	
60	64	Mária Danielová	Slovakia	4:08.27	+32.06	
61	68	Kristrún Guðnadóttir	Iceland	4:09.30	+33.09	
62	76	Eglė Savickaitė	Lithuania	4:09.61	+33.40	
63	54	Nadezhda Stepashkina	Kazakhstan	4:10.15	+33.94	
64	66	Sofiia Shkatula	Ukraine	4:10.35	+34.14	
65	67	Tia Janežič	Slovenia	4:11.19	+34.98	
66	70	Tena Hadžić	Croatia	4:12.88	+36.67	
67	60	Maddie Hooker	Australia	4:13.09	+36.88	
68	81	Enkhbayaryn Ariuntungalag	Mongolia	4:15.19	+38.98	
69	61	Chi Chunxue	China	4:15.62	+39.41	
70	56	Kitija Auziņa	Latvia	4:16.03	+39.82	
71	63	Xeniya Shalygina	Kazakhstan	4:16.26	+40.05	
72	89	Eduarda Ribera	Brazil	4:17.05	+40.84	
73	77	Kalina Nedyalkova	Bulgaria	4:21.14	+44.93	
74	69	Bruna Moura	Brazil	4:22.07	+45.86	
75	73	Ema Sobol	Croatia	4:22.67	+46.46	
76	75	Samanta Krampe	Latvia	4:22.81	+46.60	
77	83	Sára Pónya	Hungary	4:24.13	+47.92	
78	72	Wang Yundi	China	4:24.95	+48.74	
79	87	Yelizaveta Nopriienko	Ukraine	4:26.22	+50.01	
80	71	Nahiara Díaz	Argentina	4:27.01	+50.80	
81	86	Daryna Myhal	Ukraine	4:27.57	+51.36	
82	80	Linda Kaparkalēja	Latvia	4:27.62	+51.41	
83	78	Agustina Groetzner	Argentina	4:28.52	+52.31	
84	79	He Kaile	China	4:30.88	+54.67	
85	88	Delia Reit	Romania	4:31.50	+55.29	
86	82	Anja Ilić	Serbia	4:44.69	+1:08.48	
87	85	Ieva Dainytė	Lithuania	4:49.25	+1:13.04	
	74	Han Da-som	South Korea	Disqualified		
	84	Lee Eui-jin	South Korea	Disqualified		

=== Quarterfinals ===
Two fastest athletes from each quarterfinal qualified (Q) for semifinals. In addition, two athletes with the fastest times among all others ("lucky losers", LL) also qualified.

Quarterfinal 1

Rank	Seed	Athlete	Country	Time	Deficit	Note
1	2	Jonna Sundling	Sweden	3:55.29		Q
2	16	Kristine Stavås Skistad	Norway	3:56.05	+0.76	Q
3	4	Jasmi Joensuu	Finland	3:56.59	+1.30	
4	26	Sammy Smith	United States	3:59.07	+3.78	
5	6	Nicole Monsorno	Italy	4:00.68	+5.39	
6	30	Lauren Jortberg	United States	4:00.89	+5.60	

Quarterfinal 2

Rank	Seed	Athlete	Country	Time	Deficit	Note
1	1	Linn Svahn	Sweden	3:55.44		Q
2	8	Caterina Ganz	Italy	3:56.05	+0.61	Q
3	28	Julia Kern	United States	3:56.32	+0.88	LL
4	23	Anja Weber	Switzerland	3:56.54	+1.10	
5	5	Nadine Fähndrich	Switzerland	3:57.49	+2.05	
6	21	Sofie Krehl	Germany	4:04.40	+8.96	

Quarterfinal 3

Rank	Seed	Athlete	Country	Time	Deficit	Note
1	10	Johanna Matintalo	Finland	3:55.17		Q
2	17	Laura Gimmler	Germany	3:55.58	+0.41	Q
3	15	Julie Bjervig Drivenes	Norway	3:55.88	+0.71	LL
4	29	Lea Fischer	Switzerland	4:00.74	+5.57	
5	13	Amanda Saari	Finland	4:03.86	+8.69	
6	11	Mélissa Gal	France	4:07.84	+12.67	

Quarterfinal 4

Rank	Seed	Athlete	Country	Time	Deficit	Note
1	7	Maja Dahlqvist	Sweden	3:58.22		Q
2	9	Federica Cassol	Italy	3:59.10	+0.88	Q
3	25	Kateřina Janatová	Czech Republic	3:59.20	+0.98	
4	20	Jessie Diggins	United States	3:59.33	+1.11	
5	14	Jasmin Kähärä	Finland	4:00.49	+2.27	
6	27	Heidi Bucher	Austria	4:06.62	+8.40	

Quarterfinal 5

Rank	Seed	Athlete	Country	Time	Deficit	Note
1	24	Coletta Rydzek	Germany	3:57.75		Q
2	12	Milla Grosberghaugen Andreassen	Norway	3:57.92	+0.17	Q
3	3	Johanna Hagström	Sweden	3:57.96	+0.21	
4	19	Iris De Martin Pinter	Italy	3:59.25	+1.50	
5	22	Ingrid Bergene Aabrekk	Norway	4:00.47	+2.72	
6	18	Julie Pierrel	France	4:13.57	+15.82	

=== Semifinals ===
Two fastest athletes from each semifinal qualified (Q) for the final. In addition, two athletes with the fastest times among all others ("lucky losers", LL) also qualified.

Semifinal 1

Rank	Seed	Athlete	Country	Time	Deficit	Note
1	2	Jonna Sundling	Sweden	4:09.60		Q
2	1	Linn Svahn	Sweden	4:10.36	+0.76	Q
3	16	Kristine Stavås Skistad	Norway	4:10.75	+1.15	LL
4	28	Julia Kern	United States	4:12.32	+2.72	LL
5	8	Caterina Ganz	Italy	4:12.52	+2.92	
6	10	Johanna Matintalo	Finland	4:16.74	+7.14	

Semifinal 2

Rank	Seed	Athlete	Country	Time	Deficit	Note
1	15	Julie Bjervig Drivenes	Norway	4:13.16		Q
2	7	Maja Dahlqvist	Sweden	4:14.85	+1.69	Q
3	17	Laura Gimmler	Germany	4:15.48	+2.32	
4	24	Coletta Rydzek	Germany	4:17.67	+4.51	
5	12	Milla Grosberghaugen Andreassen	Norway	4:19.06	+5.90	
6	9	Federica Cassol	Italy	4:33.14	+19.98	

=== Final ===
The final was held at 13:24.

Rank	Seed	Athlete	Country	Time	Deficit	Note
1st place, gold medalist(s)	1	Linn Svahn	Sweden	4:03.05		
2nd place, silver medalist(s)	2	Jonna Sundling	Sweden	4:04.64	+1.59	
3rd place, bronze medalist(s)	7	Maja Dahlqvist	Sweden	4:07.88	+4.83	
4	15	Julie Bjervig Drivenes	Norway	4:11.74	+8.69	
5	16	Kristine Stavås Skistad	Norway	4:32.47	+29.42	
6	28	Julia Kern	United States	4:43.41	+40.36	
