= Emma Ribom =

Swedish cross-country skier (born 1997)

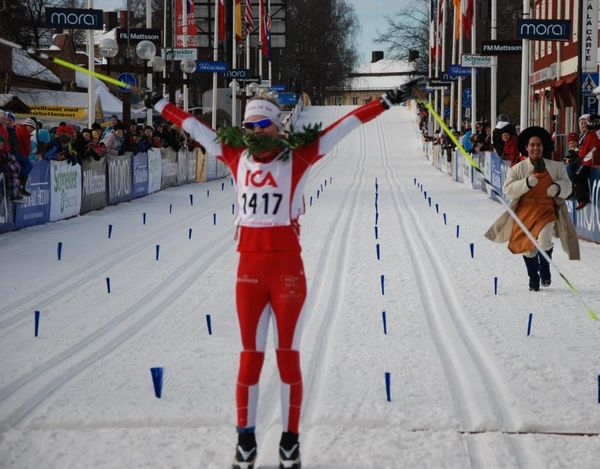
- Emma Ribom winning Ungdomsvasan in 2013.

Personal information
- Full name: Emma Sofia Ribom
- Nationality: Sweden
- Born: 29 November 1997 (age 28) Kalix, Sweden

Sport
- Sport: Skiing
- Club: Piteå Elit

World Cup career
- Seasons: 6 – (2019–present)
- Indiv. starts: 100
- Indiv. podiums: 10
- Indiv. wins: 4
- Team starts: 10
- Team podiums: 9
- Team wins: 4
- Overall titles: 0 – (9th in 2024)
- Discipline titles: 0
Medal record
Women's cross-country skiing
Representing Sweden
World Championships
Gold medal – first place	2023 Planica	Team sprint
Gold medal – first place	2025 Trondheim	4 x 7.5 km relay
Silver medal – second place	2023 Planica	Individual sprint
Bronze medal – third place	2023 Planica	4 × 5 km relay
U23 World Championships
Gold medal – first place	2020 Oberwiesenthal	Individual sprint
Bronze medal – third place	2020 Oberwiesenthal	10 km classical
Bronze medal – third place	2020 Oberwiesenthal	15 km freestyle
Junior World Championships
Gold medal – first place	2016 Râșnov	4 × 2.5 km relay
- Updated on 5 December 2025

Emma Sofia Ribom (born 29 November 1997) is a Swedish cross-country skier.

Ribom has two World Championship gold medals, from the 2023 team sprint and the 2025 relay, as well as silver medal from the 2023 sprint and a bronze medal from the 2023 relay.

She won Ungdomsvasan in February 2013. She placed tenth in the 50 km classical race at the 2026 Winter Olympics.

== Cross-country skiing results ==
All results are sourced from the International Ski Federation (FIS).

=== Olympic Games ===
Year	Age	10 km individual	15/20 km skiathlon	30/50 km mass start	Sprint	4 × 5 km relay	Team sprint
2022	24	19	—	29	6	—	—
2026	28	13	—	10	—	—	—

=== World Championships ===
- 4 medals – (2 gold, 1 silver, 1 bronze)

Year	Age	10 km individual	20 km skiathlon	30/50 km mass start	Sprint	4 × 7.5 km relay	Team sprint
2021	23	—	18	14	—	—	—
2023	25	—	—	19	Silver	Bronze	Gold
2025	27	18	11		17	Gold	—

=== World Cup ===
==== Season standings ====
Season	Age	Discipline standings				Ski Tour standings			
Season	Age	Overall	Distance	Sprint	U23	Nordic Opening	Tour de Ski	Ski Tour 2020	World Cup Final
2019	21	97	84	75	21	—	—	—N/a	—
2020	22	23	23	20	4	26	DNF	9	—N/a
2021	23	17	18	15	—N/a	11	21	—N/a	—N/a
2022	24	24	34	13	—N/a	—N/a	—	—N/a	—N/a
2023	25	17	29	12	—N/a	—N/a	—	—N/a	—N/a
2024	26	9	16	6	—N/a	—N/a	16	—N/a	—N/a
2025	27	26	24	25	—N/a	—N/a	—	—N/a	—N/a

==== Individual podiums ====
- 4 victories – (4 WC)
- 10 podiums – (9 WC, 1 WCS)

No.	Season	Date	Location	Race	Level	Place
1	2020–21	9 January 2021	Val di Fiemme, Italy	1.3 km sprint C	World Cup stage	3rd
2	2021–22	26 February 2022	Lahti, Finland	1.6 km sprint F	World Cup	2nd
3	2022–23	25 November 2022	Rukatunturi, Finland	1.4 km sprint C	World Cup	1st
4	2022–23	3 December 2022	Lillehammer, Norway	1.6 km sprint F	World Cup	1st
5	2022–23	21 January 2023	Livigno, Italy	1.2 km sprint F	World Cup	3rd
6	2022–23	28 January 2023	Les Rousses, France	1.3 km sprint C	World Cup	2nd
7	2023–24	24 November 2023	Rukatunturi, Finland	1.4 km sprint C	World Cup	1st
8	2023–24	9 December 2023	Östersund, Sweden	1.4 km sprint C	World Cup	1st
9	2023–24	15 December 2023	Trondheim, Norway	1.4 km sprint F	World Cup	3rd
10	2025–26	5 December 2025	Trondheim, Norway	1.4 km sprint C	World Cup	2nd

==== Team podiums ====
- 4 victories – (2 RL, 2 TS)
- 9 podiums – (6 RL, 3 TS)

No.	Season	Date	Location	Race	Level	Place	Teammate(s)
1	2019–20	22 December 2019	Lillehammer, Norway	4 × 5 km relay C/F	World Cup	3rd	Rönnlund / Kalla / Lundgren
2	2020–21	24 January 2021	Lahti, Finland	4 × 5 km relay C/F	World Cup	2nd	Kalla / Modig / Andersson
3	2021–22	5 December 2021	Lillehammer, Norway	4 × 5 km relay C/F	World Cup	2nd	Karlsson / Andersson / Olsson
4	2022–23	22 January 2023	Livigno, Italy	6 × 1.2 km team sprint F	World Cup	2nd	Sundling
5	2022–23	5 February 2023	Toblach, Italy	4 × 7.5 km relay C/F	World Cup	2nd	Andersson / Ilar / Sundling
6	2022–23	24 March 2023	Lahti, Finland	6 × 1.4 km team sprint F	World Cup	1st	Sundling
7	2023–24	3 December 2023	Gällivare, Sweden	4 × 7.5 km relay C/F	World Cup	1st	Lundgren / Andersson / Ilar
8	2024–25	13 December 2024	Davos, Switzerland	12 × 0.6 km team sprint F	World Cup	1st	Sundling
9	2024–25	24 January 2025	Engadin, Switzerland	4 × 5 km Mixed relay C/F	World Cup	1st	Burman / Anger / Ilar
