= Linn Svahn =

Swedish cross-country skier (born 1999)

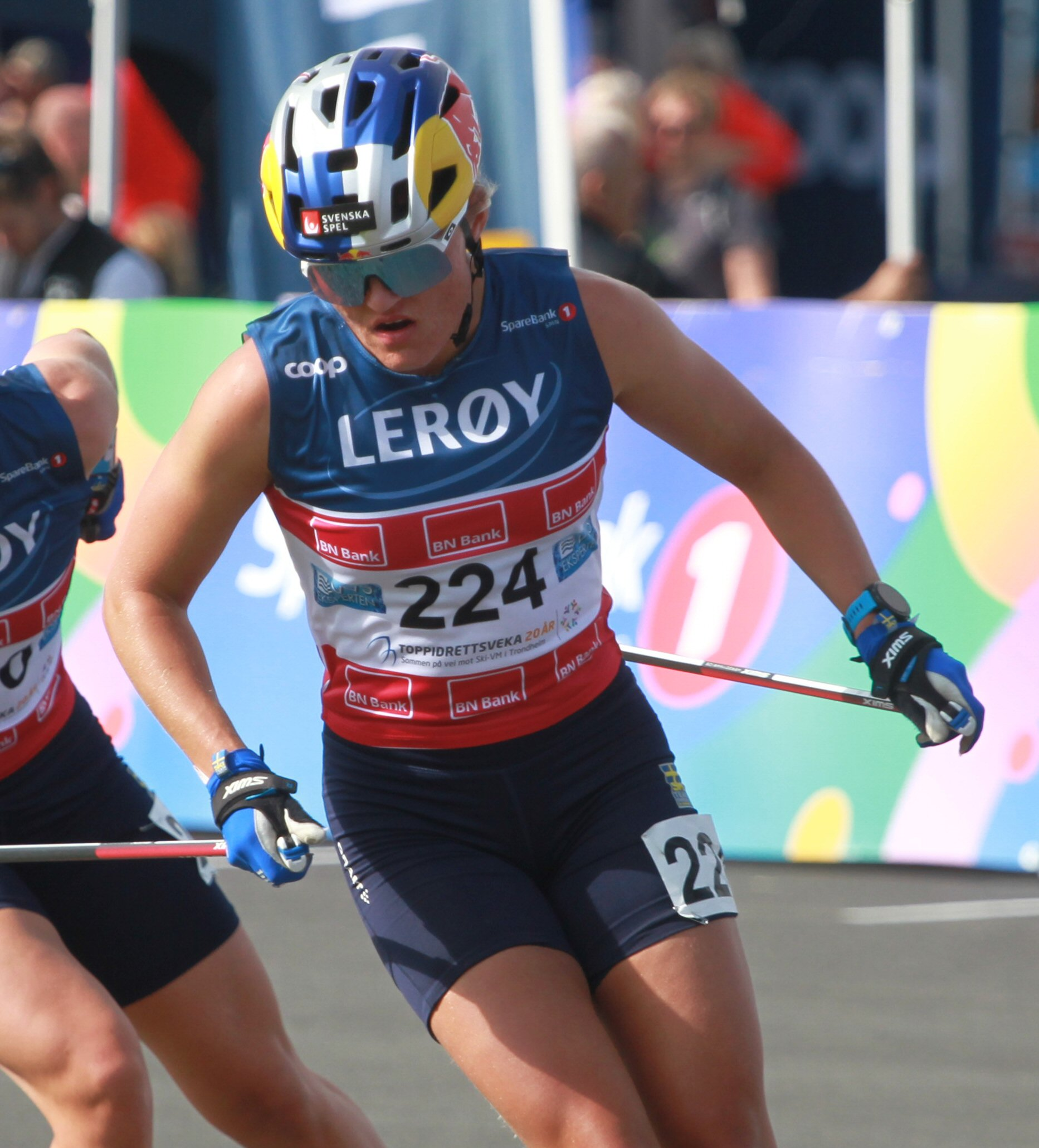
- Svahn in 2024

Personal information
- Full name: Linn Maria Svahn
- Nationality: Sweden
- Born: 9 December 1999 (age 26) Lycksele, Sweden

Sport
- Sport: Skiing
- Club: Östersunds SK

World Cup career
- Seasons: 5 – (2019–2021, 2023—present)
- Indiv. starts: 79
- Indiv. podiums: 34
- Indiv. wins: 20
- Team starts: 8
- Team podiums: 7
- Team wins: 6
- Overall titles: 0 – (2nd in 2024)
- Discipline titles: 3 – (2 SP, 1 U23)
Medal record
Women's cross-country skiing
Representing Sweden
Olympic Games
Gold medal – first place	2026 Milano Cortina	Individual sprint
Silver medal – second place	2026 Milano Cortina	4 × 7.5 km relay
Junior World Championships
Bronze medal – third place	2019 Lahti	4 × 3.33 km relay
- Updated on 24 January 2026

Linn Maria Svahn (born 9 December 1999) is a Swedish cross-country skier who represents the club Östersunds SK. On 14 December 2019, she won her first World Cup competition, when winning a sprint competition in Davos, Switzerland.

Svahn was forced to skip the World Championships of 2025 in Trondheim after a severe head concussion injury, and also missed the rest of the season.

Svahn won the gold medal in the Individual sprint at the 2026 Winter Olympics.

== Cross-country skiing results ==
All results are sourced from the International Ski Federation (FIS).

=== Olympic Games ===
- 2 medals – (1 gold, 1 silver)

Year	Age	10 km individual	20 km skiathlon	50 km mass start	Sprint	4 × 7.5 km relay	Team sprint
2026	26	—	—	—	Gold	Silver	—

=== World Championships ===
Year	Age	10 km individual	15 km skiathlon	30 km mass start	Sprint	4 × 5 km relay	Team sprint
2021	21	—	—	—	11	—	—
2023	23	—	16	4	4	—	—
2025	25	—	—	—	—	—	—

=== World Cup ===
==== Season titles ====
- 3 titles – (2 sprint, 1 U23)

Season
Season	Discipline
2020	Sprint
2021	Under-23
2024	Sprint

==== Season standings ====
Season	Age	Discipline standings				Ski Tour standings			
Season	Age	Overall	Distance	Sprint	U23	Nordic Opening	Tour de Ski	Ski Tour 2020	World Cup Final
2019	19	99	—	65	—	—	—	—N/a	—
2020	20	16	39	1st place, gold medalist(s)	2nd place, silver medalist(s)	—	—	31	—N/a
2021	21	7	14	3rd place, bronze medalist(s)	1st place, gold medalist(s)	7	14	—N/a	—N/a
2023	23	53	67	30	—N/a	—N/a	—	—N/a	—N/a
2024	24	2nd place, silver medalist(s)	8	1st place, gold medalist(s)	—N/a	—N/a	6	—N/a	—N/a
2025	25	30	36	28	—N/a	—N/a	18	—N/a	—N/a

==== Individual podiums ====
- 20 victories – (13 WC, 7 SWC)
- 34 podiums – (25 WC, 9 SWC)

No.	Season	Date	Location	Race	Level	Place
1	2019–20	14 December 2019	Davos, Switzerland	1.5 km Sprint F	World Cup	1st
2	2019–20	11 January 2020	Dresden, Germany	1.3 km Sprint F	World Cup	1st
3	2019–20	8 February 2020	Falun, Sweden	1.4 km Sprint C	World Cup	1st
4	2019–20	4 March 2020	Konnerud, Norway	1.2 km Sprint F	World Cup	3rd
5	2020–21	27 November 2020	Rukatunturi, Finland	1.4 km Sprint C	Stage World Cup	1st
6	2020–21	1 January 2021	Val Müstair, Switzerland	1.4 km Sprint F	Stage World Cup	1st
7	2020–21	2 January 2021	Val Müstair, Switzerland	10 km Mass Start C	Stage World Cup	1st
8	2020–21	9 January 2021	Val di Fiemme, Italy	1.3 km Sprint C	Stage World Cup	1st
9	2020–21	30 January 2021	Falun, Sweden	10 km Mass Start C	World Cup	1st
10	2020–21	31 January 2021	Falun, Sweden	1.4 km Sprint C	World Cup	1st
11	2023–24	9 December 2023	Östersund, Sweden	1.4 km Sprint C	World Cup	3rd
12	2023–24	15 December 2023	Trondheim, Norway	1.4 km Sprint F	World Cup	2nd
13	2023–24	30 December 2023	Toblach, Italy	1.4 km Sprint F	Stage World Cup	1st
14	2023–24	1 January 2024	Toblach, Italy	20 km Pursuit F	Stage World Cup	3rd
15	2023–24	3 January 2024	Davos, Switzerland	1.2 km Sprint F	Stage World Cup	1st
16	2023–24	6 January 2024	Val di Fiemme, Italy	15 km Mass Start C	Stage World Cup	1st
17	2023–24	19 January 2024	Oberhof, Germany	1.3 km Sprint C	World Cup	1st
18	2023–24	27 January 2024	Goms, Switzerland	1.5 km Sprint F	World Cup	1st
19	2023–24	10 February 2024	Canmore, Canada	1.3 km Sprint F	World Cup	3rd
20	2023–24	13 February 2024	Canmore, Canada	1.3 km Sprint C	World Cup	1st
21	2023–24	17 February 2024	(United States) Minneapolis, USA - Stifel Loppet Cup	1.5 km Sprint F	World Cup	2nd
22	2023–24	12 March 2024	Drammen, Norway	1.2 km Sprint C	World Cup	2nd
23	2023–24	15 March 2024	Falun, Sweden	1.4 km Sprint C	World Cup	2nd
24	2024–25	3 January 2025	Val di Fiemme, Italy	1.2 km Sprint C	Stage World Cup	2nd
25	2024–25	14 February 2025	Falun, Sweden	1.4 km Sprint C	World Cup	1st
26	2025–26	5 December 2025	Trondheim, Norway	1.4 km Sprint C	World Cup	3rd
27	2025–26	24 January 2026	Goms, Switzerland	1.5 km Sprint C	World Cup	1st
28	2025–26	28 February 2026	Falun, Sweden	1.4 km Sprint C	World Cup	1st
29	2025–26	7 March 2026	Lahti, Finland	1.5 km Sprint F	World Cup	2nd
30	2025–26	8 March 2026	Lahti, Finland	10 km Individual C	World Cup	2nd
31	2025–26	14 March 2026	Oslo, Norway	50 km Mass Start F	World Cup	2nd
32	2025–26	20 March 2026	(United States) Lake Placid, USA	10 km Individual C	World Cup	1st
33	2025–26	21 March 2026	(United States) Lake Placid, USA	1.4 km Sprint F	World Cup	1st
34	2025–26	22 March 2026	(United States) Lake Placid, USA	20 km Mass Start F	World Cup	2nd

==== Team podiums ====
- 6 victories – (2 RL, 4 TS)
- 7 podiums – (2 RL, 5 TS)

No.	Season	Date	Location	Race	Level	Place	Teammate
1	2019–20	22 December 2019	Planica, Slovenia	6 × 1.2 km Team Sprint F	World Cup	1st	Dahlqvist
2	2019–20	12 January 2020	Dresden, Germany	12 × 0.65 km Team Sprint F	World Cup	1st	Dahlqvist
3	2020–21	7 February 2021	Ulricehamn, Sweden	6 × 1.5 km Team Sprint F	World Cup	2nd	Dahlqvist
4	2022–23	22 January 2023	Livigno, Italy	6 × 1.2 km Team Sprint F	World Cup	1st	Dahlqvist
5	2023–24	21 January 2024	Oberhof, Germany	4 × 7.5 km Relay C/F	World Cup	1st	Karlsson / Andersson / Sundling
6	2023–24	26 January 2024	Goms, Switzerland	4 × 5 km Mixed Relay C/F	World Cup	1st	Poromaa / Karlsson / Burman
7	2023–24	1 March 2024	Lahti, Finland	6 × 1.3 km Team Sprint C	World Cup	1st	Sundling
