= FIS Nordic World Ski Championships 2025 – Women's sprint =

Women's sprint at the FIS Nordic World Ski Championships 2025
- Venue: Granåsen Ski Centre
- Location: Trondheim, Norway
- Dates: 27 February
- Competitors: 121 from 47 nations
- Winning time: 3:03.36

Medalists
gold medal	Jonna Sundling	Sweden
silver medal	Kristine Stavås Skistad	Norway
bronze medal	Nadine Fähndrich	Switzerland

The Women's sprint competition at the FIS Nordic World Ski Championships 2025 was held on 27 February 2025.

== Results ==
=== Qualification ===
The qualification was started at 10:00.

=== Quarterfinals ===
The top two of each heat and the two best-timed skiers advanced to the semifinals.

==== Quarterfinal 1 ====
Rank	Seed	Athlete	Country	Time	Deficit	Notes
1	1	Jonna Sundling	Sweden	3:08.01		Q
2	3	Kristine Stavås Skistad	Norway	3:09.89	+1.88	Q
3	25	Helen Hoffmann	Germany	3:10.25	+2.24	
4	24	Magdalena Scherz	Austria	3:10.74	+2.73	
5	27	Katri Lylynperä	Finland	3:11.16	+3.15	
6	28	Melissa Gal	France	3:11.67	+3.66	

==== Quarterfinal 2 ====
Rank	Seed	Athlete	Country	Time	Deficit	Notes
1	5	Jasmi Joensuu	Finland	3:05.66		Q
2	21	Julia Kern	United States	3:05.79	+0.13	Q
3	14	Victoria Carl	Germany	3:06.36	+0.70	
4	11	Emma Ribom	Sweden	3:06.87	+1.21	
5	29	Tereza Beranová	Czech Republic	3:07.34	+1.68	
6	30	Rosie Brennan	United States	3:16.09	+10.43	

==== Quarterfinal 3 ====
Rank	Seed	Athlete	Country	Time	Deficit	Notes
1	2	Nadine Fähndrich	Switzerland	3:02.68		Q
2	7	Julie Myhre	Norway	3:03.57	+0.89	Q
3	6	Gina del Rio	Andorra	3:03.66	+0.98	LL
4	12	Märta Rosenberg	Sweden	3:05.65	+2.97	LL
5	26	Jessie Diggins	United States	3:05.70	+3.02	
6	23	Federica Cassol	Italy	3:12.99	+10.31	

==== Quarterfinal 4 ====
Rank	Seed	Athlete	Country	Time	Deficit	Notes
1	9	Coletta Rydzek	Germany	3:09.24		Q
2	16	Lotta Udnes Weng	Norway	3:09.28	+0.04	Q
3	10	Jasmin Kähärä	Finland	3:09.38	+0.14	
4	17	Kateřina Janatová	Czech Republic	3:09.43	+0.19	
5	15	Mariel Merlii Pulles	Estonia	3:09.45	+0.21	
6	18	Liliane Gagnon	Canada	3:09.45	+0.21	

==== Quarterfinal 5 ====
Rank	Seed	Athlete	Country	Time	Deficit	Notes
1	19	Maja Dahlqvist	Sweden	3:08.48		Q
2	4	Johanna Hagström	Sweden	3:08.69	+0.21	Q
3	8	Mathilde Myhrvold	Norway	3:09.46	+0.98	
4	20	Anja Weber	Switzerland	3:09.55	+1.07	
5	22	Kate Oldham	United States	3:10.11	+1.63	
6	13	Sofie Krehl	Germany	3:11.63	+3.15	

=== Semifinals ===
The top two of each heat and the two best-timed skiers advanced to the semifinals.

==== Semifinal 1 ====
Rank	Seed	Athlete	Country	Time	Deficit	Notes
1	1	Jonna Sundling	Sweden	3:04.77		Q
2	3	Kristine Stavås Skistad	Norway	3:06.07	+1.30	Q
3	2	Nadine Fähndrich	Switzerland	3:06.33	+1.56	LL
4	21	Julia Kern	United States	3:06.37	+1.60	LL
5	5	Jasmi Joensuu	Finland	3:06.88	+2.11	
6	12	Märta Rosenberg	Sweden	3:17.82	+13.05	

==== Semifinal 2 ====
Rank	Seed	Athlete	Country	Time	Deficit	Notes
1	16	Lotta Udnes Weng	Norway	3:11.53		Q
2	19	Maja Dahlqvist	Sweden	3:11.61	+0.08	Q
3	7	Julie Myhre	Norway	3:11.90	+0.37	
4	9	Coletta Rydzek	Germany	3:14.10	+2.57	
5	6	Gina del Rio	Andorra	3:15.28	+3.75	
6	4	Johanna Hagström	Sweden	3:42.72	+31.19	

=== Final ===
Rank	Seed	Athlete	Country	Time	Deficit	Notes
1st place, gold medalist(s)	1	Jonna Sundling	Sweden	3:03.36		
2nd place, silver medalist(s)	3	Kristine Stavås Skistad	Norway	3:05.49	+2.13	
3rd place, bronze medalist(s)	2	Nadine Fähndrich	Switzerland	3:06.20	+2.84	
4	19	Maja Dahlqvist	Sweden	3:12.96	+9.60	
5	21	Julia Kern	United States	3:13.89	+10.53	
6	16	Lotta Udnes Weng	Norway	3:29.79	+26.43	
