= Rydzek =

Rydzek is a Polish surname. Notable people with the surname include:

- Coletta Rydzek (born 1997), German skier
- Johannes Rydzek (born 1991), German skier
