= Cassol =

Cassol is a surname. Notable people with the surname include:

- Fabrizio Cassol (born 1964), Belgian saxophonist
- Federica Cassol (born 2000), Italian cross-country skier
- Ivo Cassol (born 1959), Brazilian politician
