= Julia Kern =

American cross-country skier (born 1997)

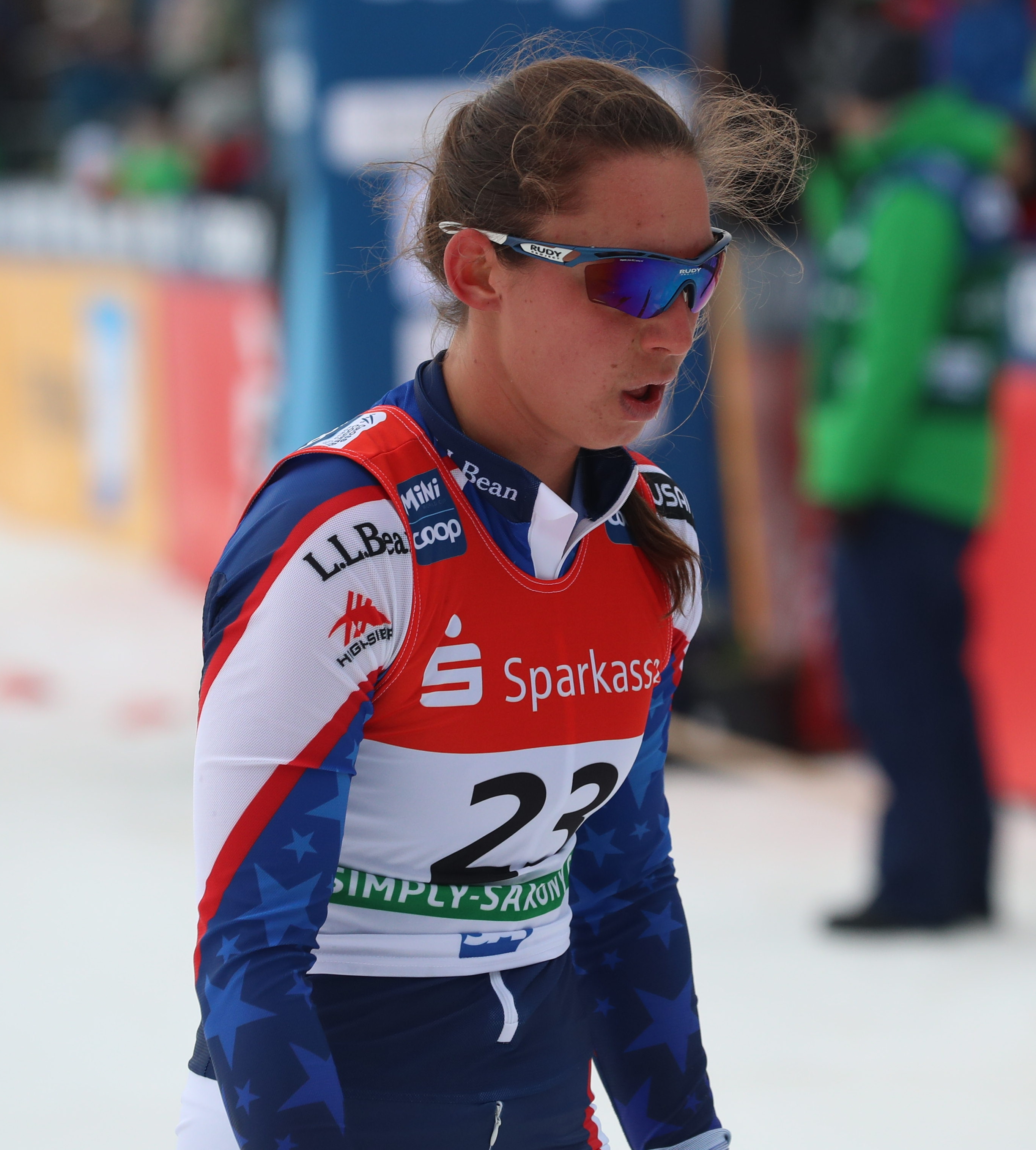
- Julia Kern in 2019

Personal information
- Nationality: United States
- Born: September 12, 1997 (age 29) Berkeley, California, United States

Sport
- Sport: Skiing
- Club: Stratton Mountain School

World Cup career
- Seasons: 8 – (2017–present)
- Indiv. starts: 146
- Indiv. podiums: 2
- Indiv. wins: 0
- Team starts: 18
- Team podiums: 4
- Team wins: 0
- Overall titles: 0 – (14th in 2023)
- Discipline titles: 0
Medal record
Women's cross-country skiing
Representing the United States
World Championships
Silver medal – second place	2025 Trondheim	Team sprint
Bronze medal – third place	2023 Planica	Team sprint
U23 World Championships
Bronze medal – third place	2020 Oberwiesenthal	Individual sprint
Junior World Championships
Bronze medal – third place	2017 Park City	4 × 3.33 km relay
- Updated on 23 March 2025

Julia Kern (born September 12, 1997) is an American cross-country skier.

== Career ==
Julia Kern was born in Berkeley, California and grew up in Waltham, Massachusetts. Kern participated in three consecutive Junior World Championships between 2015 and 2017. Individually, a 9th place in the sprint classic at the 2017 Junior World Championships in Soldier Hollow was her best result. She won a bronze medal as part of the American 4 × 3.33 km relay team.

As a senior, Julia Kern debuted in the World Cup in the 2016–17 season. She participated in the 2019 World Championships in Seefeld, Austria, where she finished 19th in the 15 km skiathlon and 23rd in the individual sprint. As a part of the American team, she finished in fifth place in the 4 × 5 km relay. On 21 December 2019, Kern was on a World Cup podium for the first time in her career, finishing third in a sprint freestyle in Planica, Slovenia. At the FIS Nordic World Ski Championships 2023, Kern and Jessie Diggins won bronze in the team sprint.

== Cross-country skiing results ==
All results are sourced from the International Ski Federation (FIS).

=== Olympic Games ===
Year	Age	10 km individual	15 km / 20 km skiathlon	30 km / 50 km skiathlon	Sprint
2022	24	—	53	—	18
2026	28	—	24	—	6

=== World Championships ===
- 2 medals – (1 silver, 1 bronze)

Year	Age	Individual	Skiathlon	Mass start	Sprint	Relay	Team sprint
2019	21	—	19	—	23	5	—
2021	23	—	—	—	36	—	—
2023	25	34	—	27	8	5	Bronze
2025	27	—	26	19	5	6	Silver

=== World Cup ===
==== Season standings ====
Season	Age	Discipline standings				Ski Tour standings			
Season	Age	Overall	Distance	Sprint	U23	Nordic Opening	Tour de Ski	Ski Tour 2020	World Cup Final
2017	19	102	NC	73	19	—	—	—N/a	46
2018	20	NC	NC	NC	NC	73	—	—N/a	—
2019	21	73	77	42	14	—	—	—N/a	43
2020	22	40	53	19	6	49	DNF	30	—N/a
2021	23	45	79	20	—N/a	50	38	—N/a	—N/a
2022	24	20	44	8	—N/a	—N/a	DNF	—N/a	—N/a
2023	25	14	37	7	—N/a	—N/a	20	—N/a	—N/a
2024	26	25	32	14	—N/a	—N/a	DNF	—N/a	—N/a

==== Individual podiums ====
- 2 podiums – (2 WC)

No.	Season	Date	Location	Race	Level	Place
1	2019–20	21 December 2019	Planica, Slovenia	1.3 km Sprint F	World Cup	3rd
2	2024–25	19 March 2025	Tallinn, Estonia	1.4 km Sprint F	World Cup	3rd

==== Team podiums ====
- 4 podiums – (2 RL, 2 TS)

No.	Season	Date	Location	Race	Level	Place	Teammate(s)
1	2021–22	19 December 2021	Dresden, Germany	12 × 0.65 km Team Sprint F	World Cup	2nd	Diggins
2	2022–23	22 January 2023	Livigno, Italy	6 × 1.2 km Team Sprint F	World Cup	3rd	Brennan
3	2022–23	5 February 2023	Toblach, Italy	4 × 7.5 km Relay C/F	World Cup	3rd	Swirbul / Brennan / Diggins
4	2023–24	3 December 2023	Gällivare, Sweden	4 × 7.5 km Relay C/F	World Cup	3rd	Diggins / Brennan / Laukli

=== US National Championships ===
2019 – (United States) Craftsbury, VT (gold) 1st, Sprint freestyle
2019 – (United States) Craftsbury, VT (silver) 2nd, Sprint classic
2019 – (United States) Craftsbury, VT (bronze) 3rd, 30 km freestyle Mass Start
