= Jasmi Joensuu =

Finnish cross-country skier (born 1996)

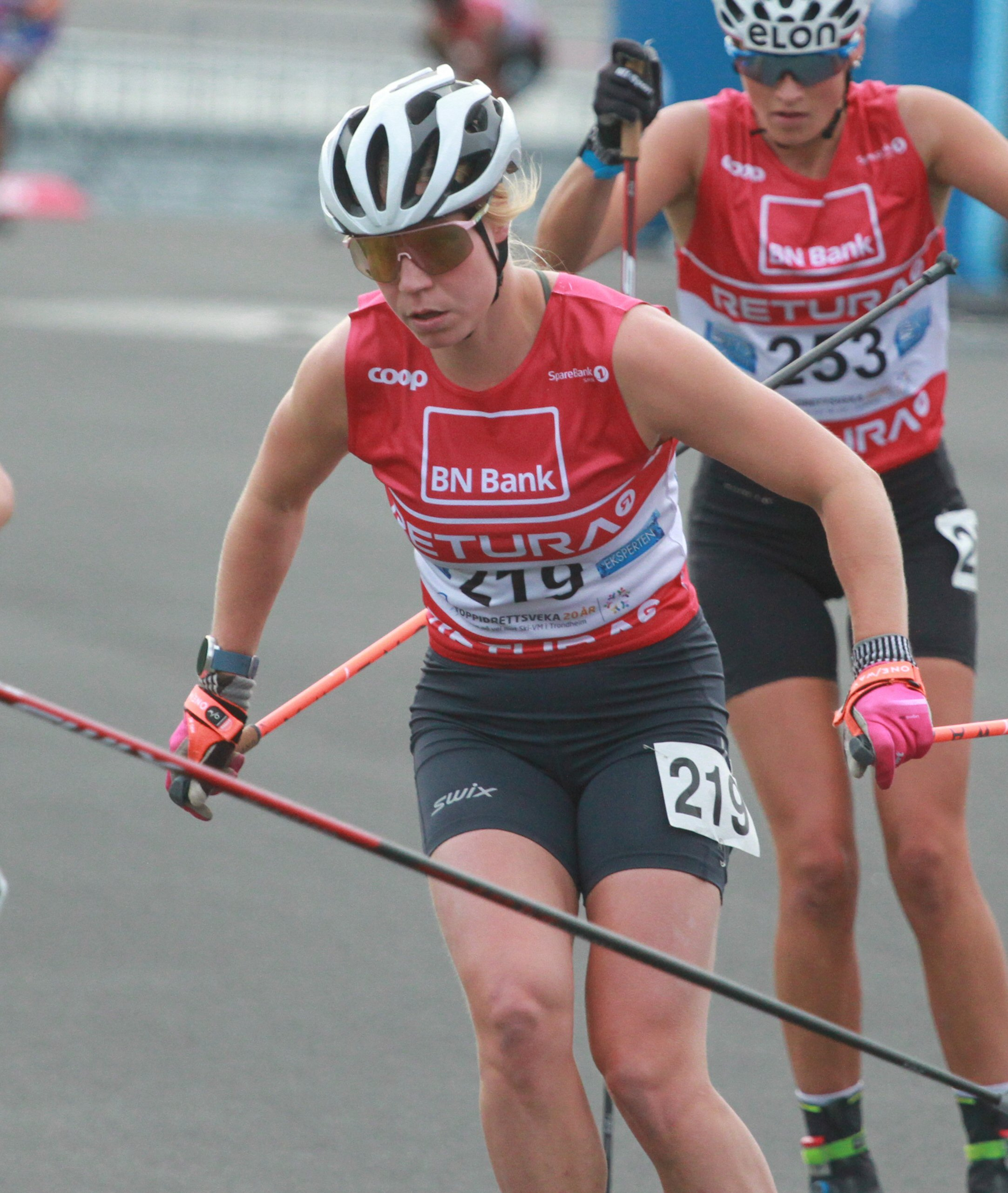

Personal information
- Nationality: Finland
- Born: 7 May 1996 (age 30) Kuortane, Finland

Sport
- Sport: Skiing
- Club: Vantaan Hiihtoseura

World Cup career
- Seasons: 8 – (2014, 2020–present)
- Indiv. starts: 90
- Indiv. podiums: 2
- Indiv. wins: 1
- Team starts: 18
- Team podiums: 2
- Team wins: 1
- Overall titles: 0 – (9th in 2025)
- Discipline titles: 1 – (SP in 2025)
Medal record
Women's cross-country skiing
Representing Finland
Olympic Games
Bronze medal – third place	2026 Milano Cortina	4 × 7.5 km relay
World Championships
Bronze medal – third place	2021 Oberstdorf	4 × 5 km relay
- Updated on 3 January 2026

Jasmi Joensuu (born 7 May 1996) is a Finnish cross-country skier.

Joensuu participated in FIS Nordic World Ski Championships 2021 in Oberstdorf, where she won the bronze medal with the Finnish team in women's 4 × 5 km relay.

She was part of two NCAA Championship Skiing Teams (2016 and 2018) at the University of Denver, where she was a three-time all-America selection.

== Cross-country skiing results ==
All results are sourced from the International Ski Federation (FIS).

=== Olympic Games ===
Year	Age	10 km individual	15/20 km skiathlon	30/50 km mass start	Sprint	4 × 5/7.5 km relay	Team sprint
2022	25	—	—	—	27	—	—
2026	29	—	—	—	14	Bronze	9

=== World Championships ===
- 1 medal – (1 bronze)

Year	Age	10 km individual	15/20 km skiathlon	30/50 km mass start	Sprint	4 × 5/7.5 km relay	Team sprint
2021	24	—	—	—	17	Bronze	7
2023	26	32	—	—	16	—	6
2025	28	—	—	—	9	4	4

=== World Cup ===
==== Season standings ====
Season	Age	Discipline standings			Ski Tour standings			
Season	Age	Overall	Distance	Sprint	Nordic Opening	Tour de Ski	Ski Tour 2020	World Cup Final
2014	17	NC	—	NC	—	—	—N/a	—
2020	23	95	81	72	DNF	—	—	—N/a
2021	24	49	56	25	28	DNF	—N/a	—N/a
2022	25	32	47	17	—N/a	—	—N/a	—N/a
2023	26	35	45	17	—N/a	DNF	—N/a	—N/a
2024	27	36	50	14	—N/a	DNF	—N/a	—N/a
2025	28	9	43	1st place, gold medalist(s)	—N/a	15	—N/a	—N/a

==== Individual podiums ====
- 1 win – (0 WC, 1 SWC)
- 2 podiums – (0 WC, 2 SWC)

No.	Season	Date	Location	Race	Level	Place
1	2024–25	28 December 2024	Toblach, Italy	1.4 km Sprint F	Stage World Cup	2nd
2	2025–26	3 January 2026	Val di Fiemme, Italy	1.5 km Sprint C	Stage World Cup	1st

==== Team podiums ====
- 1 victory – (1 TS)
- 2 podiums – (1 RL, 1 TS)

No.	Season	Date	Location	Race	Level	Place	Teammates
1	2023–24	21 January 2024	Oberhof, Germany	4 × 7.5 km Relay C/F	World Cup	3rd	Matintalo / Kyllönen / Pärmäkoski
2	2024–25	31 January 2025	Cogne, Italy	6 × 1.3 km Team Sprint C	World Cup	1st	Niskanen
