= Kristine Stavås Skistad =

Norwegian cross-country skier (born 1999)

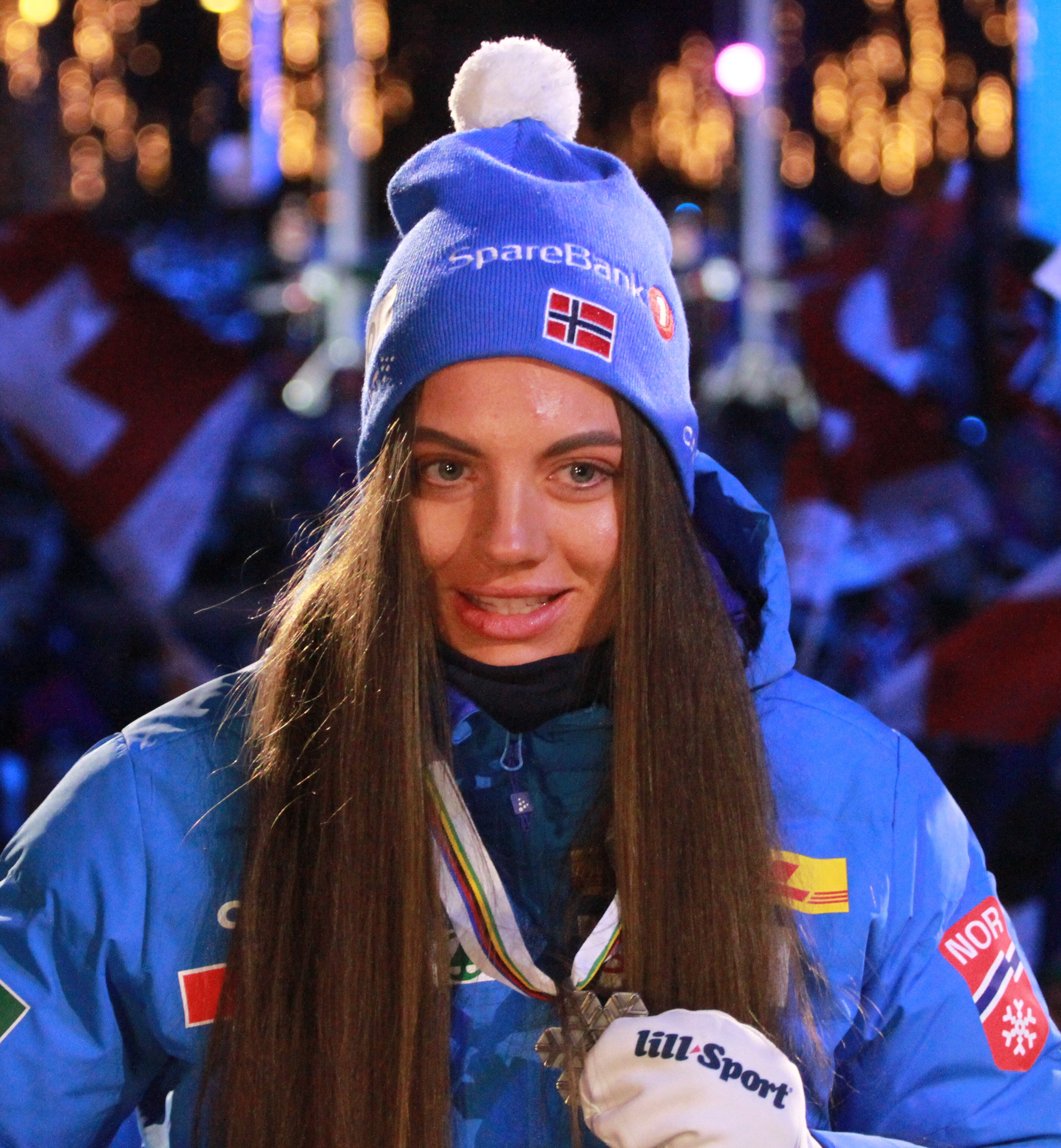

Personal information
- Nationality: Norway
- Born: 8 February 1999 (age 27)

Sport
- Sport: Skiing
- Club: Konnerud IL

World Cup career
- Seasons: 8 – (2018–present)
- Indiv. starts: 51
- Indiv. podiums: 24
- Indiv. wins: 13
- Team starts: 4
- Team podiums: 1
- Overall titles: 0 – (14th in 2024)
- Discipline titles: 0
Medal record
Women's cross-country skiing
Representing Norway
World Championships
Silver medal – second place	2025 Trondheim	Individual sprint
Junior World Championships
Gold medal – first place	2019 Lahti	Individual sprint
Gold medal – first place	2019 Lahti	4 × 3.33 km relay
Silver medal – second place	2018 Goms	Individual sprint
- Updated on 12 March 2026

Kristine Stavås Skistad (born 8 February 1999) is a Norwegian cross-country skier, junior world champion and participant in the FIS Cross-Country World Cup.

== Career ==
Stavås Skistad represents the club Konnerud IL. She won the gold medal in classic sprint at the 2019 Nordic Junior World Ski Championships, and the silver medal in the freestyle sprint at the 2018 Nordic Junior World Ski Championships. As of February 2019, her best World Cup result is a fifth place in the sprint final at the 2018 Nordic Opening in Lillehammer. She was selected to represent Norway in the sprint event at the World Championships 2019 in Seefeld.

In January 2023 she became Norwegian champion in sprint, and took her first individual World Cup victory by winning the sprint competition in Les Rousses.

She won another national title in sprint in 2025. She won a silver medal in the individual sprint at the FIS Nordic World Ski Championships 2025.

She started the 2025/2026 season by winning the sprint in the opening competition at Beitostølen in November 2025.

== Cross-country skiing results ==
All results are sourced from the International Ski Federation (FIS).

=== World Championships ===
- 1 medal – (1 silver)

Year	Age	10 km individual	15/20 km skiathlon	30/50 km mass start	Sprint	4 × 5/7.5 km relay	Team sprint
2019	20	—	—	—	11	—	—
2023	24	—	—	—	5	—	—
2025	26	—	—	—	Silver	—	7

=== World Cup ===
==== Season standings ====
Season	Age	Discipline standings				Ski Tour standings			
Season	Age	Overall	Distance	Sprint	U23	Nordic Opening	Tour de Ski	Ski Tour 2020	World Cup Final
2018	19	NC	—	NC	NC	—	—	—N/a	—
2019	20	72	—	36	13	DNF	—	—N/a	—
2020	21	60	—	34	11	—	—	—	—N/a
2021	22	99	—	65	23	—	—	—N/a	—N/a
2022	23	49	—	26	3rd place, bronze medalist(s)	—N/a	—	—N/a	—N/a
2023	24	25	—	6	—N/a	—N/a	—	—N/a	—N/a
2024	25	14	NC	2nd place, silver medalist(s)	—N/a	—N/a	DNF	—N/a	—N/a
2025	26	36	—	10	—N/a	—N/a	DNF	—N/a	—N/a

==== Individual podiums ====
- 13 victories – (12 WC, 1 SWC)
- 24 podiums – (21 WC, 3 SWC)

No.	Season	Date	Location	Race	Level	Place
1	2022–23	28 January 2023	Les Rousses, France	1.3 km Sprint C	World Cup	1st
2	2022–23	14 March 2023	Drammen, Norway	1.2 km Sprint C	World Cup	1st
3	2022–23	18 March 2023	Falun, Sweden	1.4 km Sprint F	World Cup	1st
4	2022–23	21 March 2023	Tallinn, Estonia	1.4 km Sprint F	World Cup	1st
5	2022–23	25 March 2023	Lahti, Finland	1.4 km Sprint C	World Cup	1st
6	2023–24	24 November 2023	Rukatunturi, Finland	1.4 km Sprint C	World Cup	3rd
7	2023–24	9 December 2023	Östersund, Sweden	1.4 km Sprint C	World Cup	2nd
8	2023–24	15 December 2023	Trondheim, Norway	1.4 km Sprint F	World Cup	1st
9	2023–24	30 December 2023	Toblach, Italy	1.4 km Sprint F	Stage World Cup	3rd
10	2023–24	3 January 2024	Davos, Switzerland	1.2 km Sprint F	Stage World Cup	2nd
11	2023–24	10 February 2024	Canmore, Canada	1.3 km Sprint F	World Cup	1st
12	2023–24	13 February 2024	Canmore, Canada	1.3 km Sprint C	World Cup	2nd
13	2023–24	17 February 2024	(United States) Minneapolis, USA - Stifel Loppet Cup	1.5 km Sprint F	World Cup	3rd
14	2023–24	3 March 2024	Lahti, Finland	1.5 km Sprint F	World Cup	1st
15	2023–24	12 March 2024	Drammen, Norway	1.2 km Sprint C	World Cup	1st
16	2023–24	15 March 2024	Falun, Sweden	1.4 km Sprint C	World Cup	1st
17	2024–25	18 January 2025	Les Rousses, France	1.3 km Sprint C	World Cup	1st
18	2024–25	25 January 2025	Engadin, Switzerland	1.3 km Sprint F	World Cup	2nd
19	2024–25	14 February 2025	Falun, Sweden	1.4 km Sprint C	World Cup	3rd
20	2024–25	21 March 2025	Lahti, Finland	1.5 km Sprint F	World Cup	2nd
21	2025–26	29 November 2025	Rukatunturi, Finland	1.4 km Sprint C	World Cup	1st
22	2025–26	28 December 2025	Toblach, Italy	1.4 km Sprint F	Stage World Cup	1st
23	2025–26	28 February 2026	Falun, Sweden	1.4 km Sprint F	World Cup	2nd
24	2025–26	12 March 2026	Drammen, Norway	1.2 km Sprint C	World Cup	2nd

==== Team podiums ====
- 1 podium – (1 TS)

No.	Season	Date	Location	Race	Level	Place	Teammate(s)
1	2025–26	12 December 2025	Davos, Switzerland	6 × 1.2 km Team Sprint F	World Cup	3rd	Fosnæs
