= Coletta Rydzek =

German cross-country skier (born 1997)

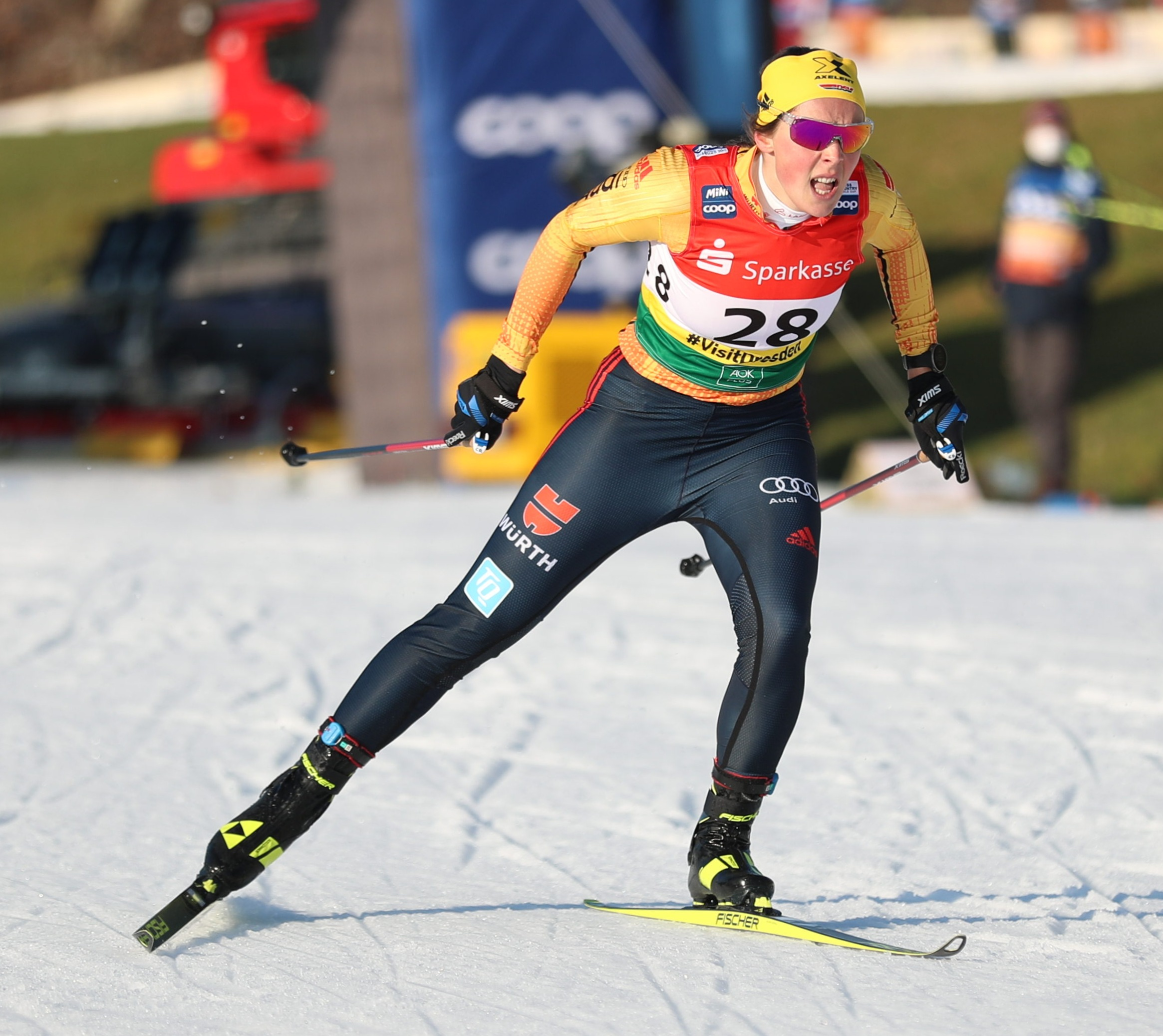
- Rydzek in 2020

Personal information
- Nationality: Germany
- Born: 6 June 1997 (age 29) Oberstdorf, Germany
- Height: 1.68 m (5 ft 6 in)

Sport
- Sport: Skiing
- Club: SC Oberstdorf

World Cup career
- Seasons: 8 – (2019–present)
- Indiv. starts: 72
- Indiv. podiums: 3
- Indiv. wins: 1
- Team starts: 15
- Team podiums: 3
- Team wins: 1
- Overall titles: 0 – (28st in 2025)
- Discipline titles: 0
Medal record
Women's cross-country skiing
Representing Germany
Olympic Games
Bronze medal – third place	2026 Milano Cortina	Team sprint
Junior World Championships
Bronze medal – third place	2017 Park City	Individual sprint
- Updated on 28 December 2025

Coletta Rydzek (born 6 June 1997) is a German cross-country skier.

Rydzek is the sister of Nordic combined skier Johannes Rydzek.

== Cross-country skiing results ==
All results are sourced from the International Ski Federation (FIS).

=== Olympic Games ===
Year	Age	10 km individual	15 km skiathlon	30 km mass start	Sprint	4 × 5 km relay	Team sprint
2022	24	—	—	—	37	—	—

=== World Championships ===
Year	Age	10 km individual	15 km skiathlon	30 km mass start	Sprint	4 × 5 km relay	Team sprint
2023	25	—	—	—	14	—	—
2025	27	—	—	—	8	—	—

=== World Cup ===
==== Season standings ====
Season	Age	Discipline standings				Ski Tour standings			
Season	Age	Overall	Distance	Sprint	U23	Nordic Opening	Tour de Ski	Ski Tour 2020	World Cup Final
2019	21	NC	—	NC	NC	—	—	—N/a	—
2020	22	85	—	57	22	—	—	—	—N/a
2021	23	47	60	22	—N/a	—	—	—N/a	—N/a
2022	24	39	68	19	—N/a	—N/a	DNF	—N/a	—N/a
2023	25	31	47	13	—N/a	—N/a	DNF	—N/a	—N/a
2024	26	32	45	13	—N/a	—N/a	DNF	—N/a	—N/a
2025	27	28	91	4	—N/a	—N/a	–	—N/a	—N/a

==== Individual podiums ====
- 1 win – (1 WC)
- 5 podiums – (4 WC, 1 SWC)

No.	Season	Date	Location	Race	Level	Place
1	2023–24	3 March 2024	Lahti, Finland	1.5 km Sprint F	World Cup	2nd
2	2024–25	21 March 2025	Lahti, Finland	1.5 km Sprint F	World Cup	1st
3	2025–26	28 December 2025	Toblach, Italy	1.4 km Sprint F	Stage World Cup	2nd
4	2025–26	17 January 2026	Oberhof, Germany	1.3 km Sprint F	World Cup	2nd
5	2025–26	7 March 2026	Lahti, Finland	1.5 km Sprint F	World Cup	3rd

==== Team podiums ====
- 2 win – (2 TS)
- 4 podiums – (4 TS)

No.	Season	Date	Location	Race	Level	Place	Teammate
1	2022–23	24 March 2023	Lahti, Finland	6 × 1.4 km Team Sprint F	World Cup	3rd	Gimmler
2	2024–25	31 January 2025	Cogne, Italy	6 × 1.3 km Team Sprint C	World Cup	3rd	Gimmler
3	2024–25	22 March 2025	Lahti, Finland	6 × 1.5 km Team Sprint F	World Cup	1st	Gimmler
4	2025–26	23 January 2026	Goms, Switzerland	6 × 1.4 km Team Sprint F	World Cup	1st	Gimmler
