= FIS Nordic World Ski Championships 2023 – Women's sprint =

Women's sprint at the FIS Nordic World Ski Championships 2023
- Venue: Planica Nordic Centre
- Location: Planica, Slovenia
- Dates: 23 February
- Competitors: 99 from 35 nations

Medalists
| gold medal | Jonna Sundling | Sweden |
| silver medal | Emma Ribom | Sweden |
| bronze medal | Maja Dahlqvist | Sweden |

The Women's sprint competition at the FIS Nordic World Ski Championships 2023 was held on 23 February 2023.

== Results ==
=== Qualification ===
The qualification was started at 12:00.

| Rank | Bib | Athlete | Country | Time | Deficit | Notes |
|---|---|---|---|---|---|---|
| 1 | 21 | Jonna Sundling | Sweden | 3:22.89 | | Q |
| 2 | 11 | Emma Ribom | Sweden | 3:24.01 | +1.12 | Q |
| 3 | 27 | Kristine Stavås Skistad | Norway | 3:25.25 | +2.36 | Q |
| 4 | 3 | Laura Gimmler | Germany | 3:28.01 | +5.12 | Q |
| 5 | 5 | Maja Dahlqvist | Sweden | 3:28.28 | +5.39 | Q |
| 6 | 23 | Rosie Brennan | United States | 3:28.96 | +6.07 | Q |
| 7 | 14 | Linn Svahn | Sweden | 3:29.30 | +6.41 | Q |
| 8 | 9 | Nadine Fähndrich | Switzerland | 3:29.73 | +6.84 | Q |
| 9 | 13 | Tiril Udnes Weng | Norway | 3:29.91 | +7.02 | Q |
| 10 | 25 | Jasmi Joensuu | Finland | 3:30.08 | +7.19 | Q |
| 11 | 7 | Johanna Hagström | Sweden | 3:30.48 | +7.59 | Q |
| 12 | 15 | Julia Kern | United States | 3:31.77 | +8.88 | Q |
| 13 | 20 | Kateřina Janatová | Czech Republic | 3:31.85 | +8.96 | Q |
| 14 | 19 | Jessie Diggins | United States | 3:32.31 | +9.42 | Q |
| 15 | 22 | Anna Svendsen | Norway | 3:32.86 | +9.97 | Q |
| 16 | 1 | Tereza Beranová | Czech Republic | 3:33.51 | +10.62 | Q |
| 17 | 17 | Lotta Udnes Weng | Norway | 3:33.53 | +10.64 | Q |
| 18 | 30 | Johanna Matintalo | Finland | 3:33.59 | +10.70 | Q |
| 19 | 26 | Eva Urevc | Slovenia | 3:33.90 | +11.01 | Q |
| 20 | 28 | Jasmin Kähärä | Finland | 3:34.07 | +11.18 | Q |
| 21 | 10 | Barbora Antošová | Czech Republic | 3:35.62 | +12.73 | Q |
| 22 | 48 | Iris De Martin Pinter | Italy | 3:35.89 | +13.00 | Q |
| 23 | 29 | Coletta Rydzek | Germany | 3:36.11 | +13.22 | Q |
| 24 | 16 | Victoria Carl | Germany | 3:37.01 | +14.12 | Q |
| 25 | 24 | Anne Kyllönen | Finland | 3:37.46 | +14.57 | Q |
| 26 | 46 | Nadine Laurent | Italy | 3:37.77 | +14.88 | Q |
| 27 | 37 | Izabela Marcisz | Poland | 3:38.10 | +15.21 | Q |
| 28 | 31 | Alina Meier | Switzerland | 3:38.17 | +15.28 | Q |
| 29 | 41 | Cristina Pittin | Italy | 3:38.25 | +15.36 | Q |
| 30 | 39 | Weronika Kaleta | Poland | 3:38.30 | +15.91 | Q |
| 31 | 18 | Sofie Krehl | Germany | 3:38.90 | +16.01 | |
| 32 | 6 | Desiree Steiner | Switzerland | 3:39.31 | +16.42 | |
| 33 | 34 | Hailey Swirbul | United States | 3:39.35 | +16.46 | |
| 34 | 4 | Nicole Monsorno | Italy | 3:39.64 | +16.75 | |
| 35 | 33 | Dahria Beatty | Canada | 3:39.96 | +17.07 | |
| 36 | 53 | Katherine Weaver | Canada | 3:40.46 | +17.57 | |
| 37 | 12 | Lena Quintin | France | 3:40.94 | +18.05 | |
| 38 | 32 | Olivia Bouffard-Nesbitt | Canada | 3:41.97 | +19.08 | |
| 39 | 36 | Mélissa Gal | France | 3:42.58 | +19.69 | |
| 40 | 8 | Lea Fischer | Switzerland | 3:42.79 | +19.90 | |
| 41 | 2 | Monika Skinder | Poland | 3:43.04 | +20.15 | |
| 42 | 45 | Kaidy Kaasiku | Estonia | 3:43.45 | +20.56 | |
| 43 | 38 | Adéla Nováková | Czech Republic | 3:46.14 | +23.25 | |
| 44 | 50 | Keidy Kaasiku | Estonia | 3:46.32 | +23.43 | |
| 45 | 59 | Anita Klemenčič | Slovenia | 3:46.46 | +23.57 | |
| 46 | 44 | Anja Mandeljc | Slovenia | 3:46.66 | +23.77 | |
| 47 | 49 | Liliane Gagnon | Canada | 3:47.38 | +24.49 | |
| 48 | 35 | Lisa Unterweger | Austria | 3:48.56 | +25.67 | |
| 49 | 43 | Darya Ryazhko | Kazakhstan | 3:48.79 | +25.90 | |
| 50 | 58 | Barbora Klementová | Slovakia | 3:49.98 | +27.09 | |
| 51 | 52 | Kristrun Gudnadottir | Iceland | 3:50.27 | +27.38 | |
| 52 | 61 | Ellen Soehol Lie | Australia | 3:50.51 | +27.62 | |
| 53 | 40 | Aveli Uustalu | Estonia | 3:52.40 | +29.51 | |
| 54 | 42 | Kseniya Shalygina | Kazakhstan | 3:55.05 | +32.16 | |
| 55 | 51 | Aisha Rakisheva | Kazakhstan | 3:56.26 | +33.37 | |
| 56 | 47 | Nadezhda Stepashkina | Kazakhstan | 3:56.60 | +33.71 | |
| 57 | 56 | Viktoriya Olekh | Ukraine | 3:58.12 | +35.23 | |
| 58 | 55 | Klara Mali | Slovenia | 3:59.54 | +36.65 | |
| 59 | 60 | Marianna Klementová | Slovakia | 4:02.99 | +40.10 | |
| 60 | 54 | Samanta Krampe | Latvia | 4:04.69 | +41.80 | |
| 61 | 62 | Tena Hadžić | Croatia | 4:06.30 | +43.41 | |
| 62 | 57 | Kitija Auziņa | Latvia | 4:08.38 | +45.49 | |
| 63 | 75 | Sophia Tsu Velicer | Chinese Taipei | 4:08.75 | +45.86 | |
| 64 | 64 | Anastasiya Nikon | Ukraine | 4:08.96 | +46.07 | |
| 65 | 97 | Ariuntungalag Enkhbayar | Mongolia | 4:10.37 | +47.48 | |
| 66 | 63 | Vedrana Malec | Croatia | 4:10.89 | +48.00 | |
| 67 | 65 | Anastasiya Ivanchenko | Ukraine | 4:13.22 | +50.33 | |
| 68 | 66 | Nahiara Díaz | Argentina | 4:14.52 | +51.63 | |
| 69 | 81 | Leona Garac | Croatia | 4:20.80 | +57.91 | |
| 70 | 76 | Anja Ilić | Serbia | 4:21.16 | +58.27 | |
| 71 | 84 | Adriāna Šuminska | Latvia | 4:22.76 | +59.87 | |
| 72 | 68 | Agustina Groetzner | Argentina | 4:25.10 | +1:02.21 | |
| 73 | 82 | Katya Galstyan | Armenia | 4:28.85 | +1:05.96 | |
| 74 | 87 | Jaqueline Mourão | Brazil | 4:29.38 | +1:06.49 | |
| 75 | 83 | Enkhtuul Ariunsanaa | Mongolia | 4:30.08 | +1:07.19 | |
| 76 | 78 | Emilija Bučytė | Lithuania | 4:31.98 | +1:09.09 | |
| 77 | 85 | Kalina Nedyalkova | Bulgaria | 4:33.19 | +1:10.30 | |
| 78 | 99 | Bruna Moura | Brazil | 4:36.10 | +1:13.21 | |
| 79 | 74 | Ieva Dainytė | Lithuania | 4:40.68 | +1:17.79 | |
| 80 | 77 | Linda Kaparkalēja | Latvia | 4:40.83 | +1:17.94 | |
| 81 | 88 | Anna Rashoyan | Armenia | 4:44.41 | +1:21.52 | |
| 82 | 90 | Paraskevi Ladopoulou | Greece | 4:48.33 | +1:25.44 | |
| 83 | 71 | Mirlene Picin | Brazil | 4:53.25 | +1:30.36 | |
| 84 | 80 | Gabija Bučytė | Lithuania | 4:54.34 | +1:31.45 | |
| 85 | 70 | María Cecilia Domínguez | Argentina | 4:56.04 | +1:33.15 | |
| 86 | 73 | Ana Cvetanovska | North Macedonia | 4:56.94 | +1:34.05 | |
| 87 | 91 | Samaneh Beyrami Baher | Iran | 5:01.99 | +1:39.10 | |
| 88 | 67 | Eduarda Ribera | Brazil | 5:12.65 | +1:49.76 | |
| 89 | 93 | Sahel Tir | Iran | 5:13.24 | +1:50.35 | |
| 90 | 94 | Martina Flores | Chile | 5:25.34 | +2:02.45 | |
| 91 | 92 | Ana Jeremič | Serbia | 5:27.11 | +2:04.22 | |
| 92 | 79 | Natalia Ayala | Chile | 5:35.53 | +2:12.64 | |
| 93 | 89 | Atefeh Salehi | Iran | 5:37.26 | +2:14.37 | |
| 94 | 95 | Farnoosh Shemshaki | Iran | 5:38.32 | +2:15.43 | |
| 95 | 98 | Aikaterini Vaikou | Greece | 5:47.29 | +2:24.40 | |
| 96 | 100 | Regina Martínez Lorenzo | Mexico | 6:06.04 | +2:43.15 | |
| 97 | 96 | Andrea Marković | Serbia | 6:26.98 | +3:04.09 | |
| 98 | 72 | Jeanne Darc Tawk | Lebanon | 7:01.10 | +3:38.21 | |
| 99 | 86 | Sasha Geagea | Lebanon | 7:10.84 | +3:47.95 | |
| | 69 | Huguette Fakhry | Lebanon | Did not start | | |

=== Quarterfinals ===
The top two of each heat and the two best-timed skiers advanced to the semifinals.

==== Quarterfinal 1 ====
| Rank | Seed | Athlete | Country | Time | Deficit | Notes |
|---|---|---|---|---|---|---|
| 1 | 5 | Maja Dahlqvist | Sweden | 3:28.87 | | Q |
| 2 | 3 | Kristine Stavås Skistad | Norway | 3:29.43 | +0.56 | Q |
| 3 | 29 | Cristina Pittin | Italy | 3:29.72 | +0.85 | |
| 4 | 28 | Alina Meier | Switzerland | 3:29.75 | +0.88 | |
| 5 | 25 | Anne Kyllönen | Finland | 3:30.02 | +1.15 | |
| 6 | 21 | Barbora Antošová | Czech Republic | 3:38.87 | +10.00 | |

==== Quarterfinal 2 ====
| Rank | Seed | Athlete | Country | Time | Deficit | Notes |
|---|---|---|---|---|---|---|
| 1 | 2 | Emma Ribom | Sweden | 3:23.74 | | Q |
| 2 | 8 | Nadine Fähndrich | Switzerland | 3:24.08 | +0.34 | Q |
| 3 | 6 | Rosie Brennan | United States | 3:24.30 | +0.56 | q |
| 4 | 20 | Jasmin Kähärä | Finland | 3:28.83 | +5.09 | |
| 5 | 24 | Victoria Carl | Germany | 3:36.26 | +12.52 | |
| 6 | 27 | Izabela Marcisz | Poland | RAL | | |

==== Quarterfinal 3 ====
| Rank | Seed | Athlete | Country | Time | Deficit | Notes |
|---|---|---|---|---|---|---|
| 1 | 1 | Jonna Sundling | Sweden | 3:25.48 | | Q |
| 2 | 9 | Tiril Udnes Weng | Norway | 3:26.18 | +0.70 | Q |
| 3 | 23 | Coletta Rydzek | Germany | 3:26.92 | +1.44 | |
| 4 | 10 | Jasmi Joensuu | Finland | 3:26.99 | +1.51 | |
| 5 | 30 | Weronika Kaleta | Poland | 3:31.71 | +6.23 | |
| 6 | 26 | Nadine Laurent | Italy | 3:38.98 | +13.50 | |

==== Quarterfinal 4 ====
| Rank | Seed | Athlete | Country | Time | Deficit | Notes |
|---|---|---|---|---|---|---|
| 1 | 7 | Linn Svahn | Sweden | 3:25.21 | | Q |
| 2 | 12 | Julia Kern | United States | 3:26.07 | +0.86 | Q |
| 3 | 15 | Anna Svendsen | Norway | 3:26.82 | +1.61 | |
| 4 | 13 | Kateřina Janatová | Czech Republic | 3:27.24 | +2.03 | |
| 5 | 22 | Iris De Martin Pinter | Italy | 3:29.86 | +4.65 | |
| 6 | 18 | Johanna Matintalo | Finland | 3:35.04 | +9.83 | |

==== Quarterfinal 5 ====
| Rank | Seed | Athlete | Country | Time | Deficit | Notes |
|---|---|---|---|---|---|---|
| 1 | 11 | Johanna Hagström | Sweden | 3:25.38 | | Q |
| 2 | 4 | Laura Gimmler | Germany | 3:25.65 | +0.27 | Q |
| 3 | 16 | Tereza Beranová | Czech Republic | 3:25.94 | +0.56 | q |
| 4 | 17 | Lotta Udnes Weng | Norway | 3:27.42 | +2.04 | |
| 5 | 19 | Eva Urevc | Slovenia | 3:29.97 | +4.59 | |
| 6 | 14 | Jessie Diggins | United States | 3:31.73 | +6.35 | |

=== Semifinals ===
The top two of each heat and the two best-timed skiers advanced to the final.

==== Semifinal 1 ====
| Rank | Seed | Athlete | Country | Time | Deficit | Notes |
|---|---|---|---|---|---|---|
| 1 | 2 | Emma Ribom | Sweden | 3:21.52 | | Q |
| 2 | 3 | Kristine Stavås Skistad | Norway | 3:21.64 | +0.12 | Q |
| 3 | 1 | Jonna Sundling | Sweden | 3:21.67 | +0.15 | q |
| 4 | 5 | Maja Dahlqvist | Sweden | 3:22.71 | +1.19 | q |
| 5 | 8 | Nadine Fähndrich | Switzerland | 3:23.42 | +1.90 | |
| 6 | 16 | Tereza Beranová | Czech Republic | 3:23.46 | +1.94 | |

==== Semifinal 2 ====
| Rank | Seed | Athlete | Country | Time | Deficit | Notes |
|---|---|---|---|---|---|---|
| 1 | 7 | Linn Svahn | Sweden | 3:26.64 | | Q |
| 2 | 9 | Tiril Udnes Weng | Norway | 3:26.90 | +0.26 | Q |
| 3 | 6 | Rosie Brennan | United States | 3:27.94 | +1.30 | |
| 4 | 12 | Julia Kern | United States | 3:28.10 | +1.46 | |
| 5 | 11 | Johanna Hagström | Sweden | 3:28.61 | +1.97 | |
| 6 | 4 | Laura Gimmler | Germany | 3:34.22 | +7.58 | |

=== Final ===
| Rank | Seed | Athlete | Country | Time | Deficit | Notes |
|---|---|---|---|---|---|---|
| 1st place, gold medalist(s) | 1 | Jonna Sundling | Sweden | 3:21.67 | | |
| 2nd place, silver medalist(s) | 2 | Emma Ribom | Sweden | 3:22.54 | +0.87 | |
| 3rd place, bronze medalist(s) | 5 | Maja Dahlqvist | Sweden | 3:26.12 | +4.45 | |
| 4 | 7 | Linn Svahn | Sweden | 3:29.73 | +8.06 | |
| 5 | 3 | Kristine Stavås Skistad | Norway | 3:32.60 | +10.93 | |
| 6 | 9 | Tiril Udnes Weng | Norway | 3:48.96 | +27.29 | |
