= Laura Gimmler =

German cross-country skier (born 1993)

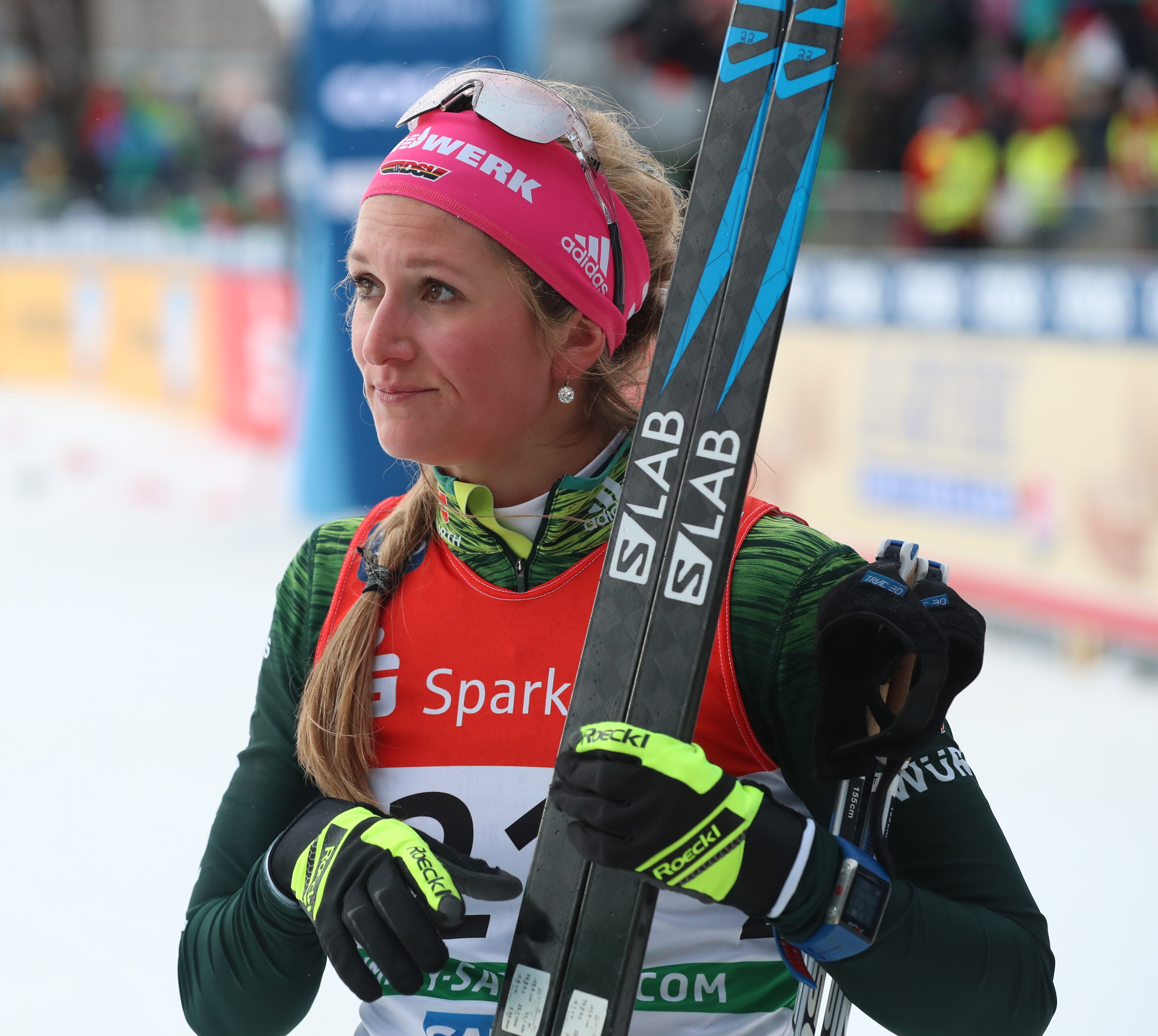
- Gimmler in 2019

Personal information
- Nationality: Germany
- Born: 5 December 1993 (age 32) Oberstdorf, Germany
- Height: 1.73 m (5 ft 8 in)

Sport
- Sport: Skiing
- Club: SC Oberstdorf

World Cup career
- Seasons: 9 – (2015, 2017–present)
- Indiv. starts: 109
- Indiv. podiums: 0
- Team starts: 17
- Team podiums: 2
- Team wins: 0
- Overall titles: 0 – (12th in 2023)
- Discipline titles: 0
Medal record
Women's cross-country skiing
Representing Germany
Olympic Games
Bronze medal – third place	2026 Milano Cortina	Team sprint
World Championships
Silver medal – second place	2023 Planica	4 × 5 km relay
Junior World Championships
Bronze medal – third place	2013 Liberec	4 × 3.33 km relay
- Updated on 9 March 2024

Laura Gimmler (born 5 December 1993) is a German cross-country skier.

She participated at the FIS Nordic World Ski Championships 2019.

== Cross-country skiing results ==
All results are sourced from the International Ski Federation (FIS).

=== Olympic Games ===
Year	Age	10 km individual	15 km skiathlon	30 km mass start	Sprint	4 × 5 km relay	Team sprint
2022	28	33	—	—	—	—	—

=== World Championships ===
Year	Age	10 km individual	15 km skiathlon	30 km mass start	Sprint	4 × 5 km relay	Team sprint
2019	25	13	—	—	20	4	—
2021	27	—	—	10	10	5	—
2023	29	—	—	20	11	Silver	4
2025	31	—	—	—	—	—	6

=== World Cup ===
==== Season standings ====
Season	Age	Discipline standings				Ski Tour standings			
Season	Age	Overall	Distance	Sprint	U23	Nordic Opening	Tour de Ski	Ski Tour 2020	World Cup Final
2015	21	NC	NC	—	NC	—	DNF	—N/a	—N/a
2017	23	74	79	78	—N/a	—	—	—N/a	—
2018	24	81	NC	51	—N/a	—	DNF	—N/a	—
2019	25	45	56	26	—N/a	DNF	DNF	—N/a	28
2020	26	62	65	41	—N/a	—	DNF	—	—N/a
2021	27	42	36	37	—N/a	41	DNF	—N/a	—N/a
2022	28	37	45	22	—N/a	—N/a	DNF	—N/a	—N/a
2023	29	12	38	8	—N/a	—N/a	16	—N/a	—N/a
2024	30	36	38	17	—N/a	—N/a	DNF	—N/a	—N/a

==== Individual podiums ====
- 2 podiums – (2 WC)

No.	Season	Date	Location	Race	Level	Place
1	2024–25	1 February 2025	Cogne, Italy	1.3 km Sprint C	World Cup	3rd
2	2025–26	24 January 2026	Goms, Switzerland	1.5 km Sprint C	World Cup	2nd

==== Team podiums ====
- 2 victories– (2 TS)
- 6 podiums – (1 RL, 5 TS)

No.	Season	Date	Location	Race	Level	Place	Teammate
1	2022–23	24 March 2023	Lahti, Finland	6 × 1.4 km Team Sprint F	World Cup	3rd	Rydzek
2	2023–24	3 December 2023	Gällivare, Sweden	4 × 7.5 km Relay C/F	World Cup	2nd	Hennig / Fink / Carl
3	2023–24	1 March 2024	Lahti, Finland	6 × 1.3 km Team Sprint C	World Cup	3rd	Hennig
4	2024–25	31 January 2025	Cogne, Italy	6 × 1.3 km Team Sprint C	World Cup	3rd	Rydzek
5	2024–25	22 March 2025	Lahti, Finland	6 × 1.5 km Team Sprint F	World Cup	1st	Rydzek
6	2025–26	23 January 2026	Goms, Switzerland	6 × 1.4 km Team Sprint F	World Cup	1st	Rydzek
