= FIS Nordic World Ski Championships 2021 – Women's sprint =

Women's sprint at the FIS Nordic World Ski Championships 2021
- Location: Oberstdorf, Germany
- Date: 25 February
- Competitors: 111 from 43 nations
- Winning time: 2:36.76

Medalists
gold medal	Jonna Sundling	Sweden
silver medal	Maiken Caspersen Falla	Norway
bronze medal	Anamarija Lampič	Slovenia

The Women's sprint competition at the FIS Nordic World Ski Championships 2021 was held on 25 February 2021.

== Results ==
=== Qualification ===
The qualification was held at 09:00.

Rank	Bib	Athlete	Country	Time	Deficit	Notes
1	24	Johanna Hagström	Sweden	2:39.33		Q
2	27	Maiken Caspersen Falla	Norway	2:41.70	+2.37	Q
3	30	Johanna Matintalo	Finland	2:42.23	+2.90	Q
4	11	Jonna Sundling	Sweden	2:42.67	+3.34	Q
5	23	Maja Dahlqvist	Sweden	2:43.06	+3.73	Q
6	8	Ane Appelkvist Stenseth	Norway	2:43.87	+4.54	Q
7	33	Katri Lylynperä	Finland	2:44.33	+5.00	Q
8	3	Linn Svahn	Sweden	2:44.52	+5.19	Q
9	5	Hristina Matsokina	Russian Ski Federation	2:45.32	+5.99	Q
10	6	Tatiana Sorina	Russian Ski Federation	2:45.61	+6.28	Q
11	1	Jasmi Joensuu	Finland	2:45.69	+6.36	Q
12	28	Anna Svendsen	Norway	2:46.05	+6.72	Q
13	26	Tiril Udnes Weng	Norway	2:46.34	+7.01	Q
14	9	Anamarija Lampič	Slovenia	2:46.51	+7.18	Q
15	14	Yuliya Stupak	Russian Ski Federation	2:46.53	+7.20	Q
16	36	Anastasia Kirillova	Belarus	2:46.58	+7.25	Q
17	16	Natalya Nepryayeva	Russian Ski Federation	2:46.65	+7.32	Q
18	18	Greta Laurent	Italy	2:47.09	+7.76	Q
19	31	Laura Gimmler	Germany	2:47.40	+8.07	Q
20	19	Lotta Udnes Weng	Norway	2:47.69	+8.36	Q
21	12	Sofie Krehl	Germany	2:47.76	+8.43	Q
22	35	Katharina Hennig	Germany	2:48.32	+8.99	Q
23	10	Jessie Diggins	United States	2:48.72	+9.39	Q
24	25	Eva Urevc	Slovenia	2:48.76	+9.43	Q
25	21	Laurien van der Graaff	Switzerland	2:48.98	+9.65	Q
26	7	Sophie Caldwell Hamilton	United States	2:49.49	+10.16	Q
27	22	Tereza Beranová	Czech Republic	2:49.53	+10.20	Q
28	20	Lucia Scardoni	Italy	2:49.78	+10.45	Q
29	47	Caterina Ganz	Italy	2:49.94	+10.61	Q
30	46	Nicole Monsorno	Italy	2:50.39	+11.06	Q
31	41	Monika Skinder	Poland	2:50.86	+11.53	
32	4	Kateřina Janatová	Czech Republic	2:51.82	+12.49	
33	15	Nadine Fähndrich	Switzerland	2:52.05	+12.72	
34	17	Rosie Brennan	United States	2:52.09	+12.76	
35	37	Petra Hynčicová	Czech Republic	2:52.11	+12.78	
36	13	Julia Kern	United States	2:52.22	+12.89	
37	29	Anne Kyllönen	Finland	2:52.34	+13.01	
38	40	Dahria Beatty	Canada	2:53.54	+14.21	
39	34	Léna Quintin	France	2:53.64	+14.31	
40	43	Alena Procházková	Slovakia	2:53.68	+14.35	
41	45	Katherine Stewart-Jones	Canada	2:54.30	+14.97	
42	44	Izabela Marcisz	Poland	2:54.33	+15.00	
43	39	Patrīcija Eiduka	Latvia	2:54.36	+15.03	
44	49	Lisa Lohmann	Germany	2:55.16	+15.83	
45	2	Alina Meier	Switzerland	2:55.84	+16.51	
46	32	Petra Nováková	Czech Republic	2:55.93	+16.60	
47	42	Maya MacIsaac-Jones	Canada	2:56.38	+17.05	
48	57	Karolina Kaleta	Poland	2:58.28	+18.95	
49	38	Lisa Unterweger	Austria	2:59.45	+20.12	
50	51	Johanna Udras	Estonia	3:00.42	+21.09	
51	52	Laura Leclair	Canada	3:00.77	+21.44	
52	54	Anna Shevchenko	Kazakhstan	3:02.15	+22.82	
53	50	Darya Ryazhko	Kazakhstan	3:02.21	+22.88	
54	63	Katerina Paul	Australia	3:02.97	+23.64	
55	53	Aveli Uustalu	Estonia	3:03.32	+23.99	
56	61	Karen Chanloung	Thailand	3:03.44	+24.11	
57	48	Vedrana Malec	Croatia	3:04.28	+24.95	
58	55	Kaidy Kaasiku	Estonia	3:04.69	+25.36	
59	60	Barbora Klementová	Slovakia	3:05.43	+26.10	
60	62	Yuliya Krol	Ukraine	3:05.44	+26.11	
61	58	Angelina Shuryga	Kazakhstan	3:06.01	+26.68	
62	65	María Iglesias	Spain	3:06.87	+27.54	
63	96	Tuva Bygrave	Australia	3:08.19	+28.86	
64	64	Maryna Antsybor	Ukraine	3:09.44	+30.11	
65	66	Aisha Rakisheva	Kazakhstan	3:09.88	+30.55	
66	56	Valentyna Kaminska	Ukraine	3:12.93	+33.60	
67	69	Viktoriya Olekh	Ukraine	3:17.94	+38.61	
68	59	Keidy Kaasiku	Estonia	3:18.00	+38.67	
69	83	Tímea Lőrincz	Romania	3:18.48	+39.15	
70	76	Lee Eui-jin	South Korea	3:18.91	+39.58	
71	77	Karolina Kukuczka	Poland	3:19.12	+39.79	
72	74	Han Da-som	South Korea	3:19.82	+40.49	
73	68	Kitija Auziņa	Latvia	3:21.58	+42.25	
74	71	Tena Hadžić	Croatia	3:22.42	+43.09	
75	79	Samanta Krampe	Latvia	3:23.99	+44.66	
76	78	Ayşenur Duman	Turkey	3:31.08	+51.75	
77	73	Nika Jagečić	Croatia	3:32.60	+53.27	
78	67	Maida Drndić	Serbia	3:33.17	+53.84	
79	94	Seher Kaçmaz	Turkey	3:33.82	+54.49	
80	70	Anja Ilić	Serbia	3:35.20	+55.87	
81	87	Eglė Savickaitė	Lithuania	3:36.12	+56.79	
82	103	Estere Volfa	Latvia	3:38.32	+58.99	
83	86	Jaqueline Mourão	Brazil	3:38.64	+59.31	
84	89	Maria Ntanou	Greece	3:40.56	+1:01.23	
85	80	Ariunsanaagiin Enkhtuul	Mongolia	3:41.22	+1:01.89	
86	91	Gígja Björnsdóttir	Iceland	3:41.73	+1:02.40	
87	105	Sára Pónya	Hungary	3:48.04	+1:08.71	
88	95	Barsnyamyn Nomin-Erdene	Mongolia	3:48.91	+1:09.58	
89	88	Nefeli Tita	Greece	3:49.05	+1:09.72	
90	75	Bruna Moura	Brazil	3:51.29	+1:11.96	
91	99	Emilija Bučytė	Lithuania	3:52.77	+1:13.44	
92	90	Sara Plakalović	Bosnia and Herzegovina	3:54.63	+1:15.30	
93	101	Kalina Nedyalkova	Bulgaria	3:56.27	+1:16.94	
94	81	Sanja Kusmuk	Bosnia and Herzegovina	3:57.51	+1:18.18	
95	82	María Cecilia Domínguez	Argentina	4:01.52	+1:22.19	
96	84	Paraskevi Ladopoulou	Greece	4:03.29	+1:23.96	
97	98	Ieva Dainytė	Lithuania	4:03.61	+1:24.28	
98	72	Samaneh Beyrami Baher	Iran	4:11.94	+1:32.61	
99	106	Anna Mkhitaryan	Armenia	4:13.18	+1:33.85	
100	102	Natalia Ayala	Chile	4:14.30	+1:34.97	
101	104	Gabija Bučytė	Lithuania	4:20.96	+1:41.63	
102	109	Dženana Hodžić	Serbia	4:27.24	+1:47.91	
103	100	Mirlene Picin	Brazil	4:28.84	+1:49.51	
104	111	Marija Bulatović	Montenegro	4:32.05	+1:52.72	
105	92	Farzaneh Rezasoltani	Iran	4:46.71	+2:07.38	
106	110	Andrea Marković	Serbia	4:51.88	+2:12.55	
107	85	Sahel Tir	Iran	4:57.02	+2:17.69	
108	112	Angelika da Silva	Portugal	4:57.24	+2:17.91	
109	97	Zahra Saveh Shemshaki	Iran	5:37.91	+2:58.58	
	93	Nour Keirouz	Lebanon	Did not finish		
	108	Huguette Fakhry	Lebanon	Did not finish		
	107	Raquel Sukkar	Lebanon	Did not start		

=== Quarterfinals ===
The top two of each heat and the two best-timed skiers advanced to the semifinals.

==== Quarterfinal 1 ====
Rank	Seed	Athlete	Country	Time	Deficit	Notes
1	2	Maiken Caspersen Falla	Norway	2:32.10		Q
2	5	Maja Dahlqvist	Sweden	2:35.56	+3.46	Q
3	19	Laura Gimmler	Germany	2:35.82	+3.72	q
4	18	Greta Laurent	Italy	2:36.21	+4.11	
5	17	Natalya Nepryayeva	Russian Ski Federation	2:38.16	+6.06	
6	29	Caterina Ganz	Italy	2:39.01	+6.91	

==== Quarterfinal 2 ====
Rank	Seed	Athlete	Country	Time	Deficit	Notes
1	14	Anamarija Lampič	Slovenia	2:35.52		Q
2	8	Linn Svahn	Sweden	2:35.94	+0.42	Q
3	25	Laurien van der Graaff	Switzerland	2:36.20	+0.68	
4	9	Hristina Matsokina	Russian Ski Federation	2:37.77	+2.25	
5	21	Sofie Krehl	Germany	2:39.27	+3.75	
6	26	Sophie Caldwell Hamilton	United States	2:40.67	+5.15	

==== Quarterfinal 3 ====
Rank	Seed	Athlete	Country	Time	Deficit	Notes
1	4	Jonna Sundling	Sweden	2:35.76		Q
2	7	Katri Lylynperä	Finland	2:36.02	+0.26	Q
3	6	Ane Appelkvist Stenseth	Norway	2:36.06	+0.30	q
4	16	Anastasia Kirillova	Belarus	2:36.36	+0.60	
5	30	Nicole Monsorno	Italy	2:41.17	+5.41	
6	24	Eva Urevc	Slovenia	2:48.60	+12.84	

==== Quarterfinal 4 ====
Rank	Seed	Athlete	Country	Time	Deficit	Notes
1	12	Anna Svendsen	Norway	2.35.35		Q
2	1	Johanna Hagström	Sweden	2:35.83	+0.48	Q
3	15	Yuliya Stupak	Russian Ski Federation	2.36.29	+0.94	
4	11	Jasmi Joensuu	Finland	2.37.38	+2.03	
5	23	Jessie Diggins	United States	2:39.73	+4.38	
6	22	Katharina Hennig	Germany	2:42.26	+6.91	

==== Quarterfinal 5 ====
Rank	Seed	Athlete	Country	Time	Deficit	Notes
1	13	Tiril Udnes Weng	Norway	2:35.40		Q
2	20	Lotta Udnes Weng	Norway	2:36.59	+1.19	Q
3	28	Lucia Scardoni	Italy	2:36.96	+1.56	
4	27	Tereza Beranová	Czech Republic	2.37.14	+1.74	
5	10	Tatiana Sorina	Russian Ski Federation	2:39.81	+4.41	
6	3	Johanna Matintalo	Finland	3:24.49	+49.09	

=== Semifinals ===
The top two of each heat and the two best-timed skiers advanced to the final.

==== Semifinal 1 ====
Rank	Seed	Athlete	Country	Time	Deficit	Notes
1	4	Jonna Sundling	Sweden	2:36.53		Q
2	2	Maiken Caspersen Falla	Norway	2:36.83	+0.30	Q
3	6	Ane Appelkvist Stenseth	Norway	2:36.89	+0.36	q
4	14	Anamarija Lampič	Slovenia	2:36.97	+0.44	q
5	5	Maja Dahlqvist	Sweden	2:37.11	+0.58	
6	8	Linn Svahn	Sweden	2:38.65	+2.12	

==== Semifinal 2 ====
Rank	Seed	Athlete	Country	Time	Deficit	Notes
1	13	Tiril Udnes Weng	Norway	2:38.21		Q
2	1	Johanna Hagström	Sweden	2:38.28	+0.07	Q
3	12	Anna Svendsen	Norway	2:38.58	+0.37	
4	7	Katri Lylynperä	Finland	2:42.30	+4.09	
5	19	Laura Gimmler	Germany	2:45.26	+7.05	
6	20	Lotta Udnes Weng	Norway	2:56.97	+18.76	

=== Final ===
Rank	Seed	Athlete	Country	Time	Deficit	Notes
1st place, gold medalist(s)	4	Jonna Sundling	Sweden	2:36.76		
2nd place, silver medalist(s)	2	Maiken Caspersen Falla	Norway	2:39.08	+2.32	
3rd place, bronze medalist(s)	14	Anamarija Lampič	Slovenia	2:39.11	+2.35	
4	1	Johanna Hagström	Sweden	2:40.70	+3.94	
5	6	Ane Appelkvist Stenseth	Norway	2:44.07	+7.31	
6	13	Tiril Udnes Weng	Norway	2:47.52	+10.76	
