= Federica Cassol =

Italian cross-country skier (born 2000)

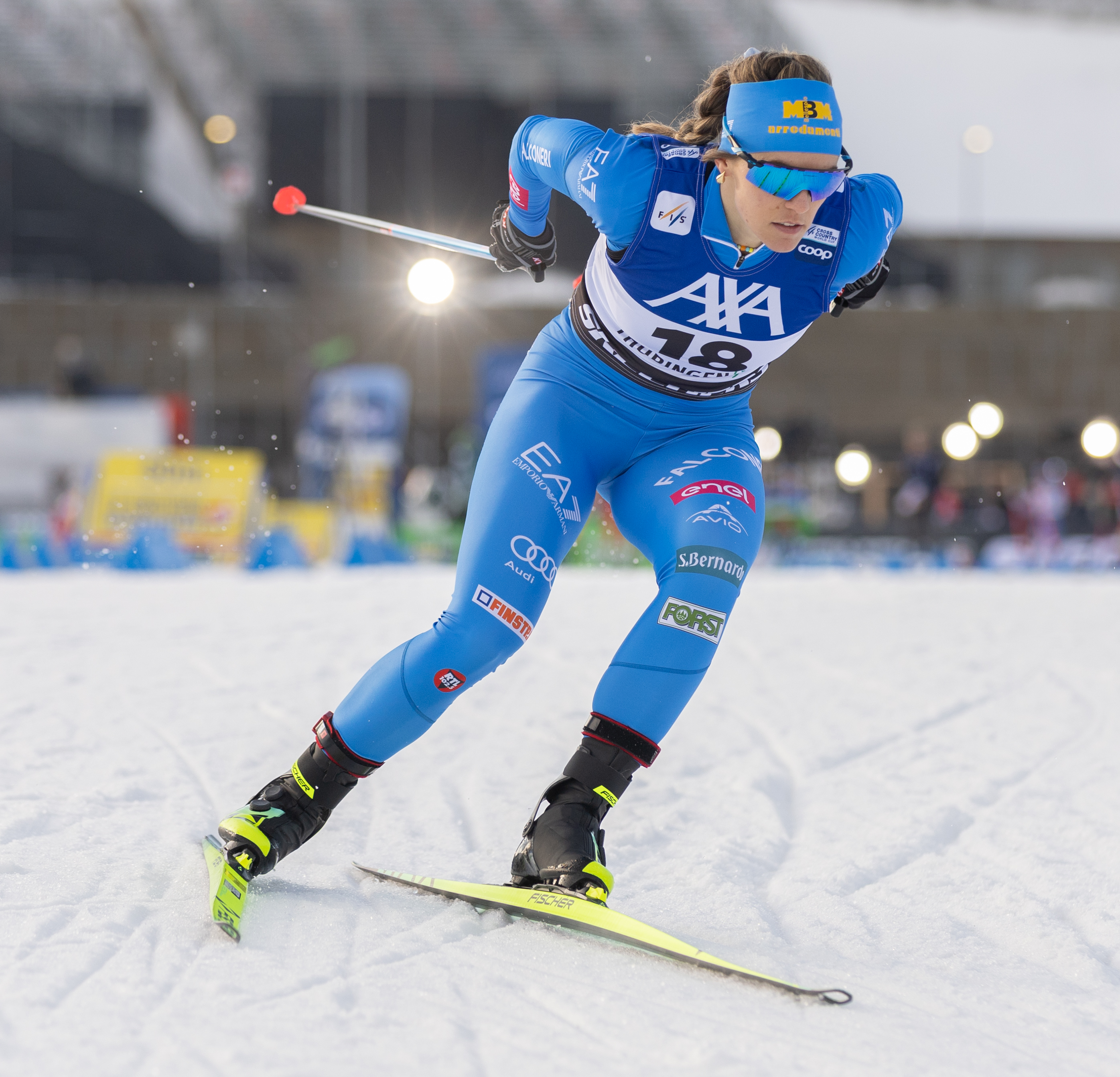
- Cassol in 2026

Personal information
- Nationality: Italy
- Born: 8 May 2000 (age 26) Aosta, Italy

Sport
- Sport: Skiing
- Club: C.S. Esercito

World Cup career
- Seasons: 3 – (2024–present)
- Indiv. podiums: 0
- Updated on 10 February 2026

Federica Cassol (born 8 May 2000) is an Italian cross-country skier who represented Italy at the 2026 Winter Olympics.

== Career ==
Cassol competed at the FIS Nordic World Ski Championships 2025 and finished in fifth place in the team sprint, along with Caterina Ganz.

In January 2026, Cassol was selected to represent Italy at the 2026 Winter Olympics. Prior to the final stage of the 2025–26 Tour de Ski, Cassol withdrew from the competition due to fatigue and preparation for the 2026 Winter Olympics. During the individual sprint qualification she finished in ninth and advanced to the quarterfinals.
