= Caterina Ganz =

Italian cross-country skier (born 1995)

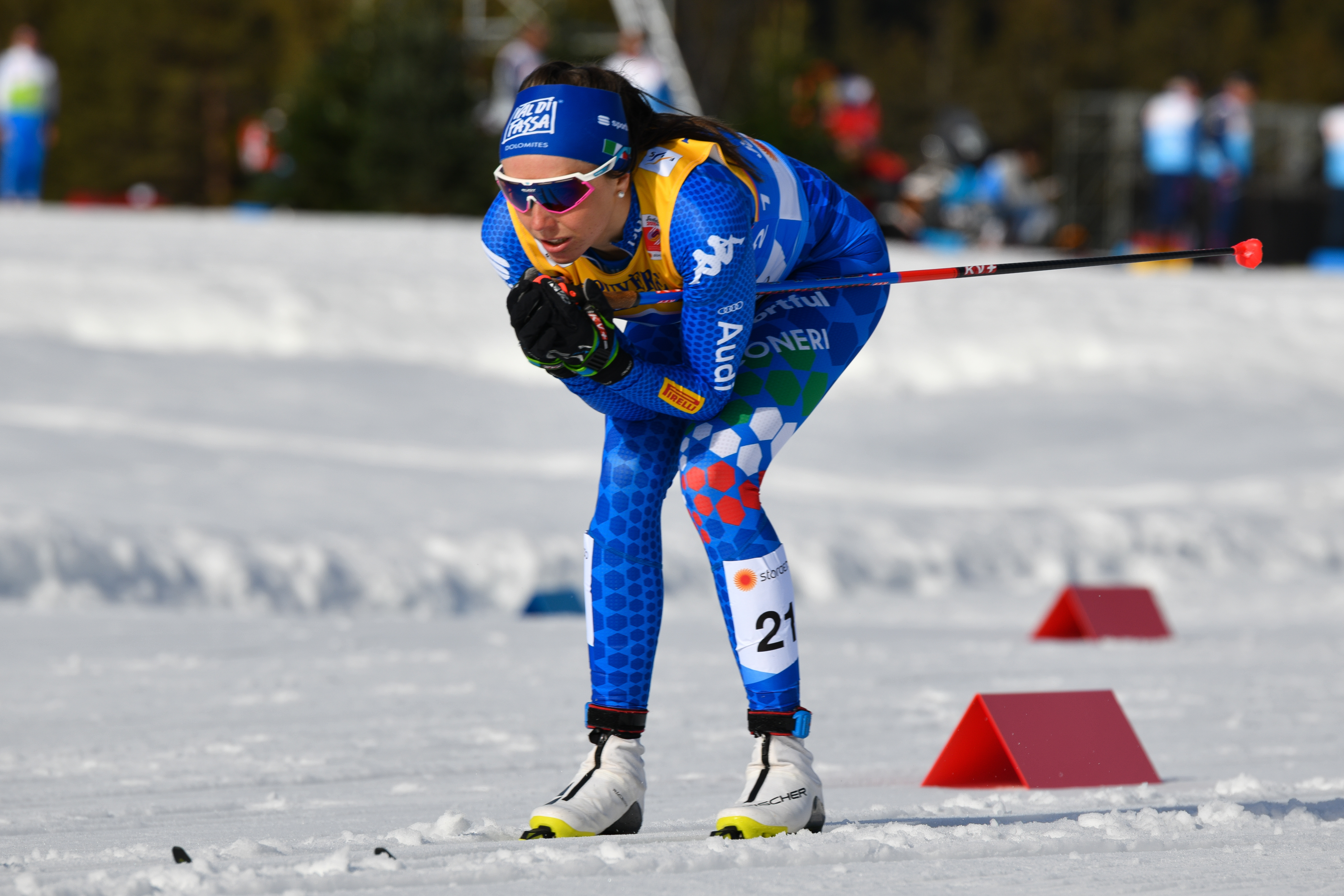
- Ganz in 2019

Personal information
- Nationality: Italy
- Born: 13 November 1995 (age 30) Cavalese, Italy

Sport
- Sport: Skiing
- Club: G.S. Fiamme Gialle

World Cup career
- Seasons: 7 – (2017–present)
- Indiv. starts: 88
- Indiv. podiums: 0
- Team starts: 6
- Team podiums: 0
- Overall titles: 0 – (36th in 2022)
- Discipline titles: 0
- Updated on 7 January 2024

Caterina Ganz (born 13 November 1995) is an Italian cross-country skier who competes internationally.

She competed for Italy at the FIS Nordic World Ski Championships 2017 in Lahti, Finland.

== Cross-country skiing results ==
All results are sourced from the International Ski Federation (FIS).

=== Olympic Games ===
Year	Age	10 km individual	15 km skiathlon	30 km mass start	Sprint	4 × 5 km relay	Team sprint
2022	26	35	42	45	30	8	13

=== World Championships ===
Year	Age	10 km individual	15 km skiathlon	30 km mass start	Sprint	4 × 5 km relay	Team sprint
2017	21	29	25	29	—	9	—
2019	23	40	33	—	—	—	—
2021	25	—	24	—	30	—	—
2023	27	—	30	—	—	—	—

=== World Cup ===
==== Season standings ====
Season	Age	Discipline standings				Ski Tour standings			
Season	Age	Overall	Distance	Sprint	U23	Nordic Opening	Tour de Ski	Ski Tour 2020	World Cup Final
2017	21	NC	NC	NC	NC	—	—	—N/a	35
2018	22	NC	NC	—	NC	—	—	—N/a	—
2019	23	48	37	56	—N/a	—	20	—N/a	38
2020	24	NC	NC	NC	—N/a	43	DNF	—	—N/a
2021	25	NC	NC	NC	—N/a	—	—	—N/a	—N/a
2022	26	36	42	34	—N/a	—N/a	20	—N/a	—N/a
2023	27	38	34	41	—N/a	—N/a	25	—N/a	—N/a
2024	28	28	25	36	—N/a	—N/a	22	—N/a	—N/a
