= Jasmin Kähärä =

Finnish cross-country skier (born 2000)

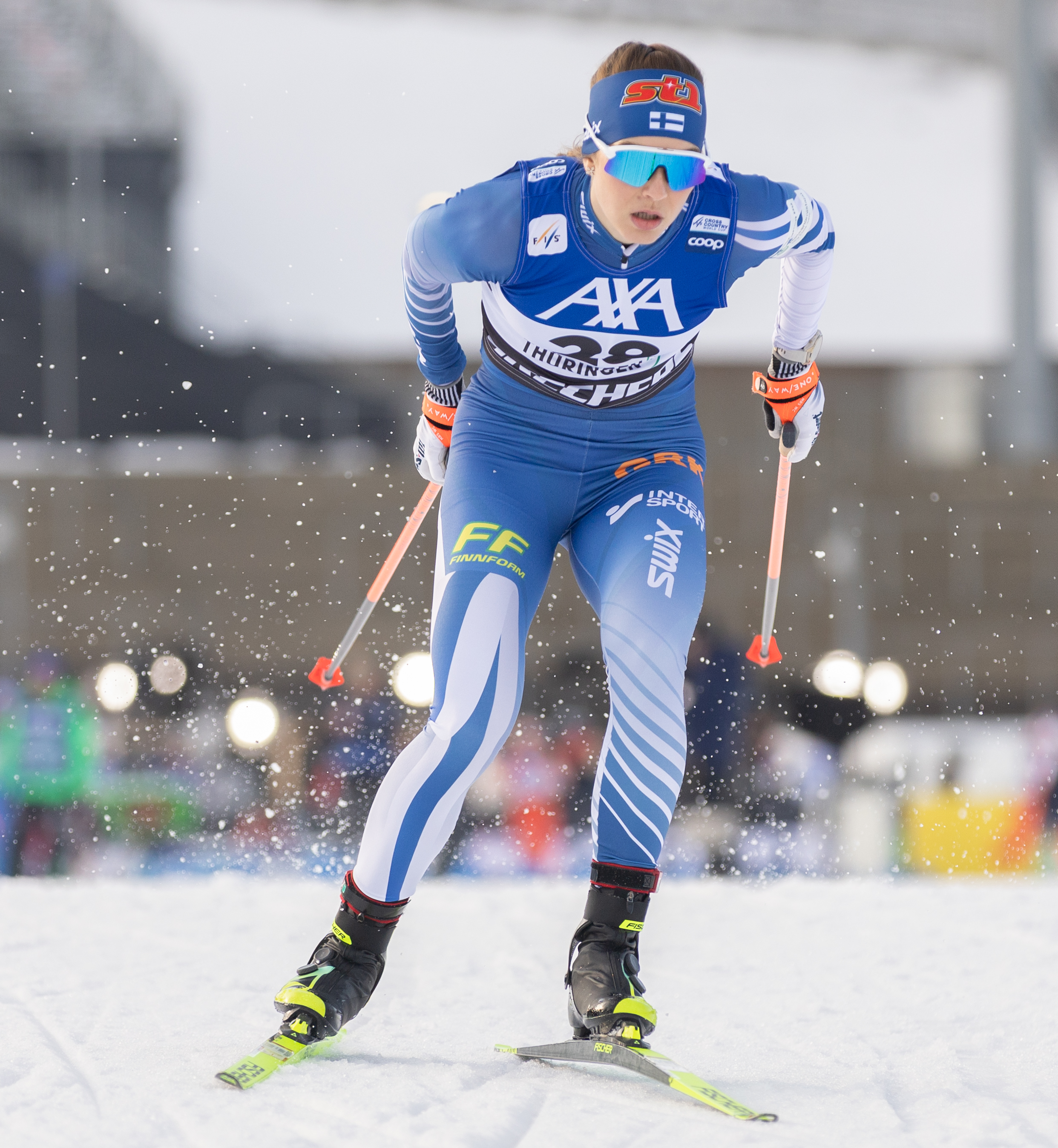

Personal information
- Nationality: Finland
- Born: 4 May 2000 (age 26) Mikkeli, Finland

Sport
- Sport: Skiing
- Club: Vuokatti Ski Team Kainuu

World Cup career
- Seasons: 4 – (2018, 2021–present)
- Indiv. starts: 20
- Indiv. podiums: 0
- Team starts: 3
- Team podiums: 0
- Overall titles: 0 – (49th in 2023)
- Discipline titles: 0
Medal record
Women's cross-country skiing
Representing Finland
U23 World Championships
Gold medal – first place	2023 Whistler	Individual sprint
- Updated on 27 March 2023

Jasmin Kähärä (born 4 May 2000) is a Finnish cross-country skier. She participated in the women's sprint in the 2022 Winter Olympics, where she placed 26th. In 2023, she won the under-23 world championship in the classical sprint in Whistler, Canada.

Kähärä has been a member of the Finnish national team since the 2022–23 season, and was also regularly included in the World Cup roster in the previous season while still a member of the national B-team. Her best World Cup result is an 8th place from the Tallinn city sprint in the 2022–23 season.

Kähärä's sister Jessica is a track and field athlete and her brother Jesse is a junior cross-country skier.

== Cross-country skiing results ==
All results are sourced from the International Ski Federation (FIS).

=== Olympic Games ===
Year	Age	10 km individual	15 km skiathlon	30 km mass start	Sprint	4 × 5 km relay	Team sprint
2022	21	—	—	—	26	—	—

=== World Championships ===
Year	Age	10 km individual	15 km skiathlon	30 km mass start	Sprint	4 × 5 km relay	Team sprint
2023	22	—	—	—	19	—	—

=== World Cup ===
==== Season standings ====
Season	Age	Discipline standings				Ski Tour standings		
Season	Age	Overall	Distance	Sprint	U23	Nordic Opening	Tour de Ski	World Cup Final
2018	17	NC	NC	NC	NC	—	—	—
2021	20	NC	NC	—	NC	—	—	—N/a
2022	21	63	80	36	8	—N/a	—	—N/a
2023	22	49	68	26	4	—N/a	DNF	—N/a
