= Gina del Rio =

Andorran cross-country skier (born 2004)

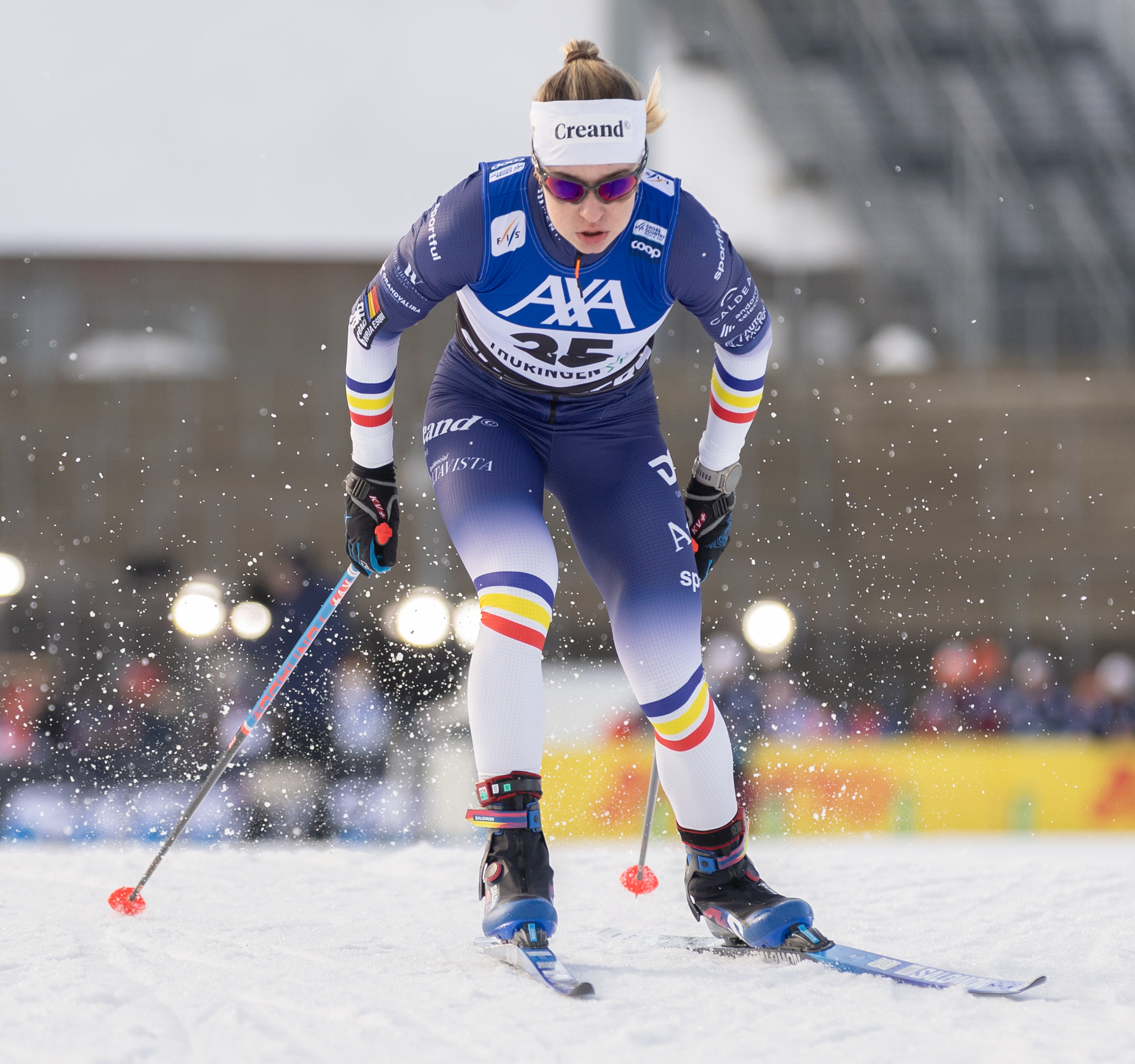

Personal information
- Nationality: Andorra
- Born: 26 January 2004 (age 22) Sant Julià de Lòria, Andorra

Sport
- Sport: Skiing
- Club: NEC

World Cup career
- Seasons: 3 – (2025–present)
- Indiv. starts: 25
- Team starts: 1
Medal record
Women's cross-country skiing
Representing Andorra
U23 World Championships
Silver medal – second place	2025 Schilpario	Sprint classical
Junior World Championships
Gold medal – first place	2024 Planica	Sprint freestyle
Silver medal – second place	2024 Planica	10 km individual classical
Bronze medal – third place	2024 Planica	20 km mass start freestyle
- Updated on 22 March 2026

Gina del Rio (born 26 January 2004) is an Andorran cross-country skier. She represented Andorra at the 2026 Winter Olympics. In 2024, she was crowned Junior World Champion in the freestyle sprint event. The next year, she won silver in the classic sprint in the U23 division of the 2025 Nordic Junior World Ski Championships.

== Cross-country skiing results ==
All results are sourced from the International Ski Federation (FIS).

=== Olympic Games ===
Year	Age	Individual	Skiathlon	Mass start	Sprint	Relay	Team sprint
2026	22	35	44	—	47	—	—

=== World Cup ===
==== Season standings ====
Season	Age	Discipline standings				Ski Tour standings
Season	Age	Overall	Distance	Sprint	U23	Tour de Ski
2024	20	105	—	70	—	—
2025	21	77	—	36	9	—
2026	22	39	38	27	3rd place, bronze medalist(s)	—
