= FIS Nordic World Ski Championships 2025 – Women's team sprint =

Women's team sprint at the FIS Nordic World Ski Championships 2025
- Venue: Granåsen Ski Centre
- Location: Trondheim, Norway
- Dates: 5 March
- Competitors: 54 from 27 nations
- Teams: 27
- Winning time: 20:51.63

Medalists
gold medal	Jonna Sundling; Maja Dahlqvist	Sweden
silver medal	Jessie Diggins; Julia Kern	United States
bronze medal	Anja Weber; Nadine Fähndrich	Switzerland

The Women's team sprint competition at the FIS Nordic World Ski Championships 2025 was held on 5 March 2025.

== Results ==
=== Qualification ===
The qualification was started at 11:00.

Rank	Bib	Country	Athletes	Time	Deficit	Notes
1	7	Italy	Caterina Ganz; Federica Cassol	7:53.89		Q
2	2	Sweden	Jonna Sundling; Maja Dahlqvist	7:57.68	+3.79	Q
3	5	Norway	Tiril Udnes Weng; Kristine Stavås Skistad	7:58.02	+4.13	Q
4	6	Switzerland	Anja Weber; Nadine Fähndrich	8:01.33	+7.44	Q
5	8	Czech Republic	Kateřina Janatová; Tereza Beranová	8:05.99	+12.10	Q
6	4	United States	Jessie Diggins; Julia Kern	8:11.49	+17.60	Q
7	12	Estonia	Mariel Merlii Pulles; Keidy Kaasiku	8:12.61	+18.72	Q
8	10	Canada	Liliane Gagnon; Alison Mackie	8:14.05	+20.16	Q
9	9	France	Mélissa Gal; Léna Quintin	8:18.30	+24.41	Q
10	26	China	Chen Lingshuang; Meng Honglian	8:18.66	+24.77	Q
11	16	Poland	Izabela Marcisz; Monika Skinder	8:23.15	+29.26	Q
12	3	Germany	Katharina Hennig; Laura Gimmler	8:23.23	+29.34	Q
13	11	Austria	Katharina Brudermann; Magdalena Scherz	8:23.61	+29.72	Q
14	1	Finland	Kerttu Niskanen; Jasmi Joensuu	8:24.82	+30.93	Q
15	14	Australia	Ellen Søhol Lie; Rosie Fordham	8:33.45	+39.56	Q
16	13	Kazakhstan	Nadezhda Stepashkina; Darya Ryazhko	8:50.25	+56.36	
17	15	South Korea	Lee Eui-jin; Han Da-som	8:50.32	+56.43	
18	17	Ukraine	Sofiia Shkatula; Anastasiia Nikon	8:58.65	+1:04.76	
19	18	Latvia	Kitija Auziņa; Linda Kaparkalēja	9:05.94	+1:12.05	
20	24	Croatia	Tena Hadžić; Ema Sobol	9:16.57	+1:22.68	
21	22	Slovakia	Mária Danielová; Emília Rendová	9:22.62	+1:28.73	
22	20	Argentina	Nahiara Díaz; Agustina Groetzner	9:24.81	+1:30.92	
23	23	Brazil	Bruna Moura; Jaqueline Mourão	9:30.10	+1:36.21	
24	21	Hungary	Sára Pónya; Lara Vanda Vaczkó	9:36.23	+1:42.34	
25	25	Lithuania	Eglė Savickaitė; Ieva Dainytė	10:00.96	+2:07.07	
26	19	Greece	Nefeli Tita; Konstantina Charalampidou	10:32.92	+2:39.03	
27	27	Serbia	Vanja Tucović; Anja Ilić	10:34.04	+2:40.15	

=== Final ===
The final was started at 14:53.

Rank	Bib	Country	Athletes	Time	Deficit
1st place, gold medalist(s)	2	Sweden	Jonna Sundling; Maja Dahlqvist	20:51.63	
2nd place, silver medalist(s)	4	United States	Jessie Diggins; Julia Kern	20:54.53	+2.90
3rd place, bronze medalist(s)	6	Switzerland	Anja Weber; Nadine Fähndrich	21:00.76	+9.13
4	1	Finland	Kerttu Niskanen; Jasmi Joensuu	21:05.99	+14.36
5	7	Italy	Caterina Ganz; Federica Cassol	21:43.15	+51.52
6	3	Germany	Katharina Hennig; Laura Gimmler	21:43.48	+51.85
7	5	Norway	Lotta Udnes Weng; Kristine Stavås Skistad	21:48.50	+56.87
8	8	Czech Republic	Kateřina Janatová; Tereza Beranová	21:59.99	+1:08.36
9	9	France	Mélissa Gal; Léna Quintin	22:03.57	+1:11.94
10	10	Canada	Liliane Gagnon; Alison Mackie	22:18.38	+1:26.75
11	16	Poland	Izabela Marcisz; Monika Skinder	22:29.78	+1:38.15
12	12	Estonia	Mariel Merlii Pulles; Keidy Kaasiku	22:41.29	+1:49.66
13	11	Austria	Katharina Brudermann; Magdalena Scherz	22:57.11	+2:05.48
14	26	China	Chen Lingshuang; Meng Honglian	22:58.62	+2:06.99
15	14	Australia	Ellen Søhol Lie; Rosie Fordham	23:18.99	+2:27.36
