= Ingrid Bergene Aabrekk =

Norwegian cross-country skier (born 2002)

Personal information
- Nationality: Norway
- Born: 14 October 2002 (age 23) Sandefjord, Norway

Sport
- Sport: Skiing
- Club: IL Runar
- Updated on 28 December 2025

Ingrid Bergene Aabrekk (born 14 October 2002) is a Norwegian cross-country skier and participant in the FIS Cross-Country World Cup.

== Career ==
Aabrekk represents the club IL Runar. On December 7, 2024, she made her World Cup debut in the sprint in Lillehammer during the 2024/25 season, where she advanced from the prologue and finished in 18th place – after being eliminated in the quarterfinals. The following season, she made it to the first sprint final of her career in Trondheim, where she finished in 5th place behind four other Swedes.

Aabrekk was selected to represent Norway at the 2026 Winter Olympics in Val di Fiemme.
