= Mélissa Gal =

French cross-country skier (born 1999)

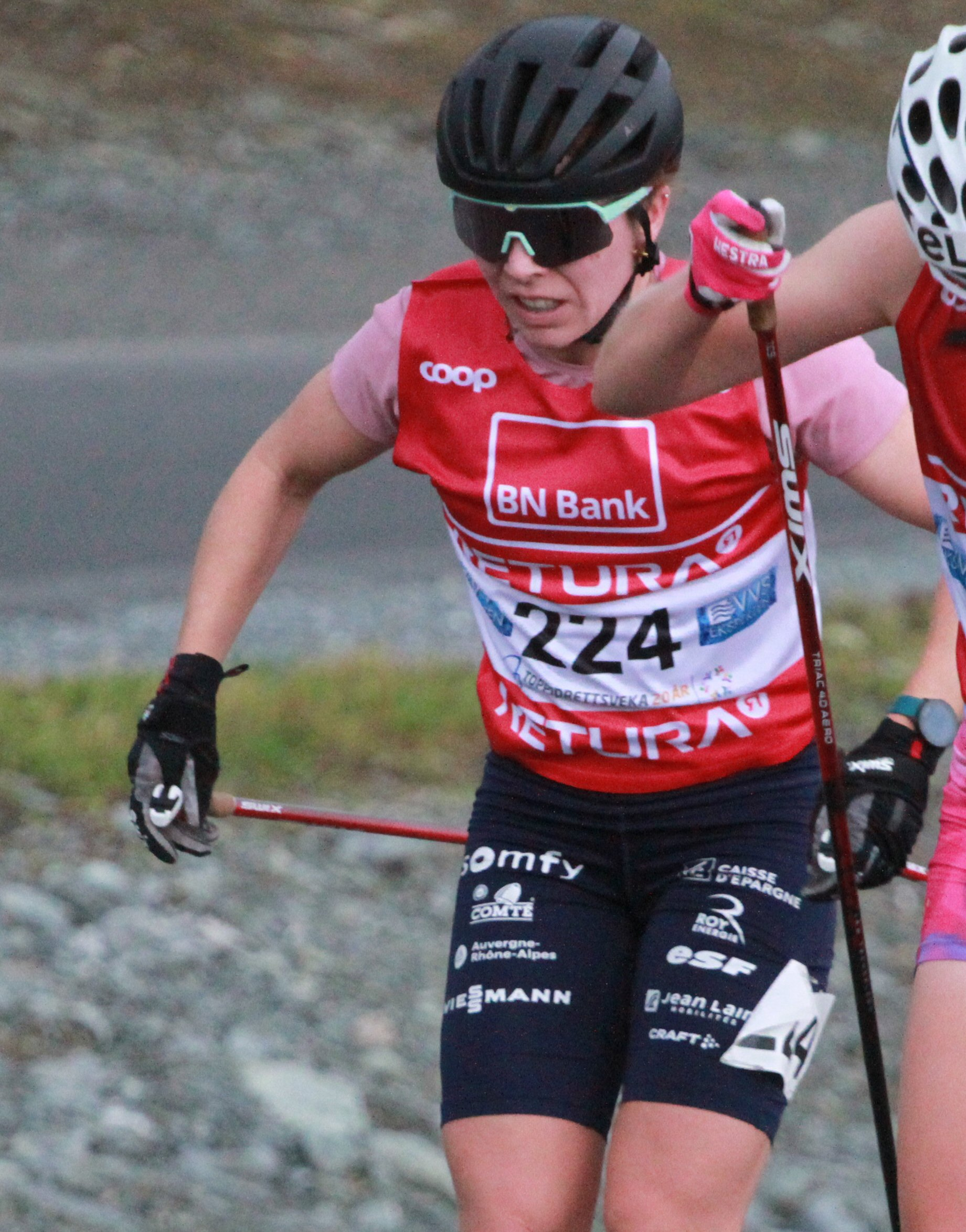
- Gal in 2024

Personal information
- Nationality: France
- Born: 26 October 1999 (age 26) Annemasse, France

Sport
- Sport: Skiing
- Club: SC Nordique du Pays Rochois

World Cup career
- Seasons: 2 – (2021, 2023–present)
- Indiv. starts: 9
- Indiv. podiums: 0
- Team starts: 1
- Team podiums: 0
- Overall titles: 0 – (98th in 2023)
- Discipline titles: 0
- Updated on 27 March 2023

Mélissa Gal (born 26 October 1999) is a French cross-country skier. She competed in the Women's 10 kilometre classical, and Women's sprint, at the 2022 Winter Olympics. She competed at the 2021–22 FIS Cross-Country World Cup.

== Cross-country skiing results ==
All results are sourced from the International Ski Federation (FIS).

=== Olympic Games ===
Year	Age	10 km individual	15 km skiathlon	30 km mass start	Sprint	4 × 5 km relay	Team sprint
2022	22	41	—	—	—	12	10

=== World Championships ===
Year	Age	10 km individual	15 km skiathlon	30 km mass start	Sprint	4 × 5 km relay	Team sprint
2023	23	—	—	—	39	—	13

=== World Cup ===
==== Season standings ====
Season	Age	Discipline standings				Ski Tour standings	
Season	Age	Overall	Distance	Sprint	U23	Nordic Opening	Tour de Ski
2021	21	NC	—	NC	NC	—	—
2023	23	98	107	67	—N/a	—N/a	DNF
