= Nicole Monsorno =

Italian cross-country skier (born 2000)

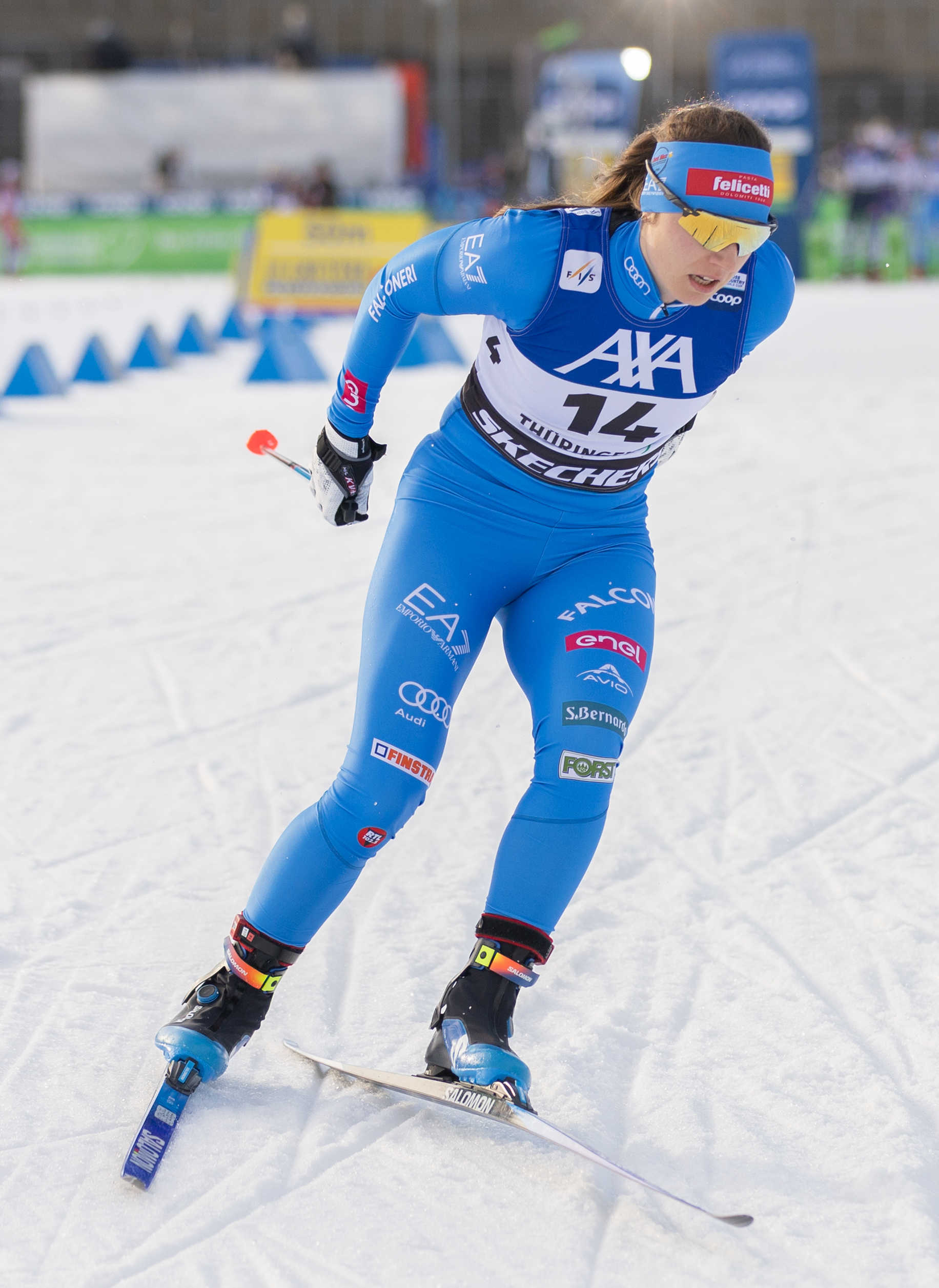
- Monsorno in 2026

Personal information
- Nationality: Italy
- Born: 7 February 2000 (age 26) Cavalese, Italy

Sport
- Sport: Skiing
- Club: G.S. Fiamme Gialle

World Cup career
- Seasons: 5 – (2022–present)
- Indiv. podiums: 0
- Updated on 10 February 2026

Nicole Monsorno (born 7 February 2000) is an Italian cross-country skier who represented Italy at the 2026 Winter Olympics.

== Career ==
In January 2026, she was selected to represent Italy at the 2026 Winter Olympics. Prior to the final stage of the 2025–26 Tour de Ski, Monsorno withdrew from the competition due to fatigue and preparation for the 2026 Winter Olympics. During the individual sprint qualification she finished sixth and advanced to the quarterfinals.
