= FIS Nordic World Ski Championships 2023 – Women's team sprint =

Women's team sprint at the FIS Nordic World Ski Championships 2023
- Venue: Planica Nordic Centre
- Location: Planica, Slovenia
- Dates: February
- Competitors: 52 from 26 nations
- Teams: 26
- Winning time: 19:40.73

Medalists
gold medal	Emma Ribom; Jonna Sundling	Sweden
silver medal	Anne Kjersti Kalvå; Tiril Udnes Weng	Norway
bronze medal	Jessie Diggins; Julia Kern	United States

The Women's team sprint competition at the FIS Nordic World Ski Championships 2023 was held on 26 February 2023.

== Results ==
=== Qualification ===
The qualification was started at 11:45.

Rank	Bib	Country	Athletes	Time	Deficit	Notes
1	3	United States	Jessie Diggins; Julia Kern	6:14.90		Q
2	1	Sweden	Emma Ribom; Jonna Sundling	6:16.38	+1.48	Q
3	2	Norway	Anne Kjersti Kalvå; Tiril Udnes Weng	6:17.01	+2.11	Q
4	4	Finland	Jasmi Joensuu; Krista Pärmäkoski	6:20.55	+5.65	Q
5	5	Germany	Laura Gimmler; Victoria Carl	6:23.72	+8.82	Q
6	6	Switzerland	Anja Weber; Nadine Fähndrich	6:24.32	+9.42	Q
7	12	Poland	Weronika Kaleta; Izabela Marcisz	6:35.13	+20.23	Q
8	13	Italy	Federica Sanfilippo; Nicole Monsorno	6:36.41	+21.51	Q
9	8	Czech Republic	Adéla Nováková; Kateřina Janatová	6:37.41	+22.51	Q
10	10	France	Mélissa Gal; Lena Quintin	6:37.74	+22.84	Q
11	11	Canada	Dahria Beatty; Liliane Gagnon	6:38.36	+23.46	Q
12	7	Slovenia	Anja Mandelic; Eva Urevc	6:38.75	+23.85	Q
13	9	Estonia	Kaidy Kaasiku; Keidy Kaasiku	6:43.78	+28.88	Q
14	21	Slovakia	Barbora Klementová; Marianna Klementová	6:49.83	+34.93	Q
15	14	Kazakhstan	Darya Ryazhko; Nadezhda Stepashkina	6:50.25	+34.93	Q
16	18	Croatia	Tena Hadžić; Vedrana Malec	7:03.09	+48.19	
17	19	Australia	Ellen Soehol Lie; Phoebe Cridland	7:04.71	+49.81	
18	17	Ukraine	Anastasiya Nikon; Viktoriya Olekh	7:09.39	+54.49	
19	15	Latvia	Samanta Krampe; Kitija Auziņa	7:13.79	+58.89	
20	16	Argentina	Nahiara Díaz; Agustina Groetzner	7:19.71	+1:04.81	
21	20	Iceland	Kristrún Guðnadóttir; Gígja Björnsdóttir	7:21.23	+1:06.33	
22	23	Mongolia	Enkhtuul Ariunsanaa; Ariuntungalag Enkhbayar	7:42.82	+1:27.92	
23	24	Lithuania	Emilija Bučytė; Ieva Dainytė	7:46.28	+1:31.38	
24	26	Brazil	Jaqueline Mourão; Bruna Moura	7:48.01	+1:33.11	
25	22	Greece	Nefeli Tita; Maria Dimitra Tsiarka	8:11.25	+1:56.35	
26	25	North Macedonia	Ana Cvetanovska; Mateja Trajkovska	9:24.82	+3:09.92	

=== Final ===
The race was started at 13:30.

Rank	Bib	Country	Athletes	Time	Deficit	Notes
1st place, gold medalist(s)	1	Sweden	Emma Ribom; Jonna Sundling	19:40.73		
2nd place, silver medalist(s)	2	Norway	Anne Kjersti Kalvå; Tiril Udnes Weng	19:43.15	+2.42	
3rd place, bronze medalist(s)	3	United States	Jessie Diggins; Julia Kern	19:46.06	+5.33	
4	5	Germany	Laura Gimmler; Victoria Carl	20:03.62	+22.89	
5	6	Switzerland	Anja Weber; Nadine Fähndrich	20:17.44	+36.71	
6	4	Finland	Jasmi Joensuu; Krista Pärmäkoski	20:18.66	+37.93	
7	8	Czech Republic	Adéla Nováková; Kateřina Janatová	20:39.72	+58.99	
8	7	Slovenia	Anja Mandelic; Eva Urevc	20:42.16	+1:01.43	
9	12	Poland	Weronika Kaleta; Izabela Marcisz	20:54.11	+1:13.38	
10	13	Italy	Federica Sanfilippo; Nicole Monsorno	20:56.66	+1:15.93	
11	9	Estonia	Kaidy Kaasiku; Keidy Kaasiku	20:57.96	+1:17.23	
12	11	Canada	Dahria Beatty; Liliane Gagnon	21:06.28	+1:25.55	
13	10	France	Mélissa Gal; Lena Quintin	21:37.67	+1:56.94	
14	14	Kazakhstan	Darya Ryazhko; Nadezhda Stepashkina	22:04.91	+2:24.18	
15	21	Slovakia	Barbora Klementová; Marianna Klementová	22:52.40	+3:11.67	
