= Maja Dahlqvist =

Swedish cross-country skier (born 1994)

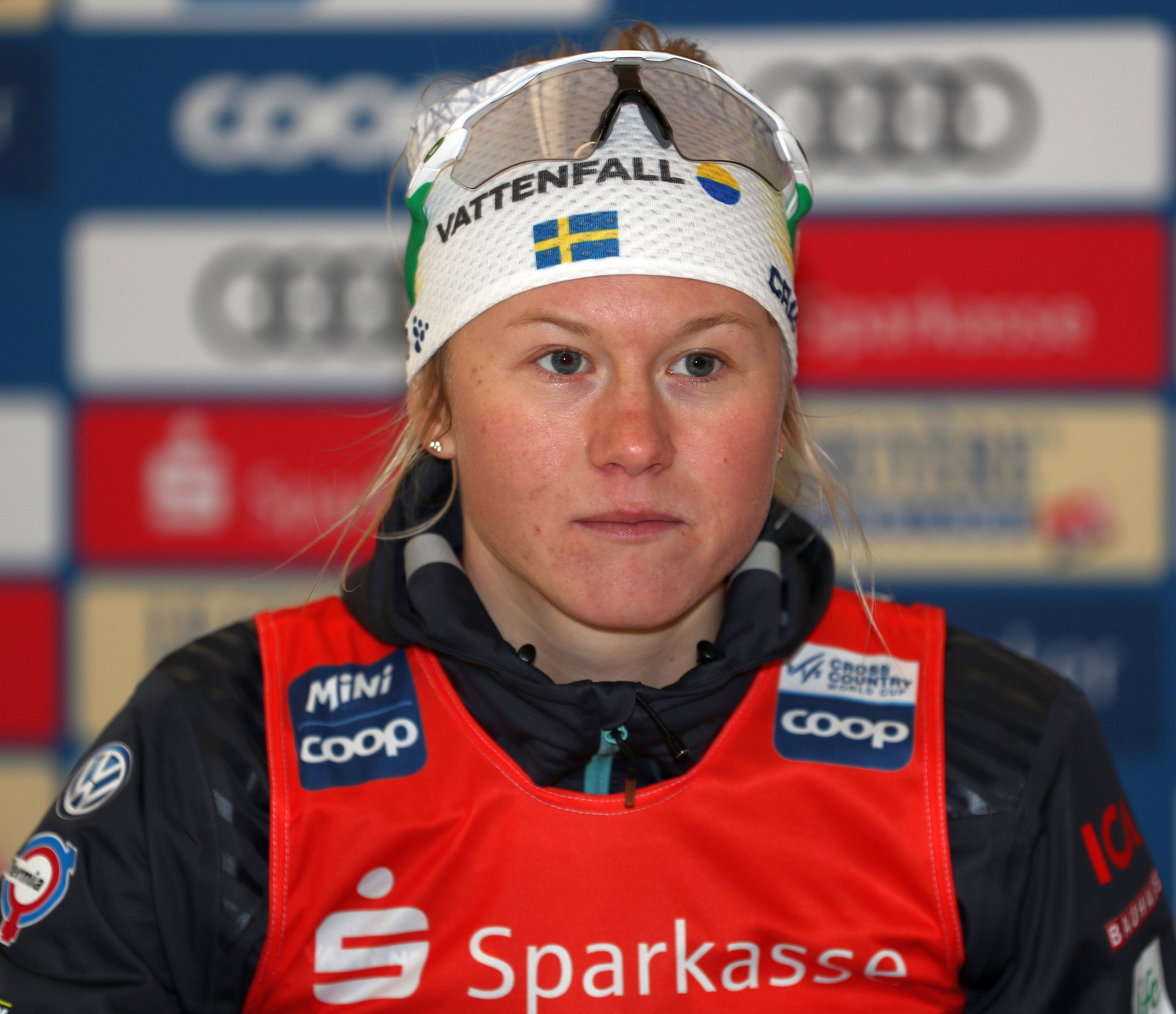
- Dahlqvist in Dresden, 2019

Personal information
- Full name: Maja Anna Linnéa Dahlqvist
- Nationality: Sweden
- Born: 15 April 1994 (age 32) Borlänge, Sweden
- Height: 1.74 m (5 ft 9 in)

Sport
- Sport: Skiing
- Club: Falun-Borlänge SK

World Cup career
- Seasons: 10 – (2015–present)
- Indiv. starts: 153
- Indiv. podiums: 35
- Indiv. wins: 6
- Team starts: 18
- Team podiums: 14
- Team wins: 8
- Overall titles: 0 – (3rd in 2026)
- Discipline titles: 3 – (SP in 2022, 2023, 2026)
Medal record
Women's cross-country skiing
Representing Sweden
Event	1st	2nd	3rd
Olympic Games	1	2	2
World Championships	3	0	2
Total	4	2	4
Olympic Games
Gold medal – first place	2026 Milano Cortina	Team sprint
Silver medal – second place	2022 Beijing	Individual sprint
Silver medal – second place	2022 Beijing	Team sprint
Bronze medal – third place	2022 Beijing	4 × 5 km relay
Bronze medal – third place	2026 Milano Cortina	Individual sprint
World Championships
Gold medal – first place	2019 Seefeld	Team sprint
Gold medal – first place	2021 Oberstdorf	Team sprint
Gold medal – first place	2025 Trondheim	Team sprint
Bronze medal – third place	2023 Planica	Individual sprint
Bronze medal – third place	2023 Planica	4 × 5 km relay
U23 World Championships
Bronze medal – third place	2016 Râșnov	Individual sprint
Bronze medal – third place	2017 Park City	Individual sprint
Junior World Championships
Gold medal – first place	2014 Val di Fiemme	4 × 3.33 km relay
- Updated on 1 March 2026

Maja Anna Linnéa Dahlqvist (born 15 April 1994) is a Swedish cross-country skier. She won the Sprint World Cup in 2022 and retained the title in 2023. She won two silver medals and a bronze at the 2022 Winter Olympics. On 10 February 2026, she won bronze in the women's sprint at the 2026 Winter Olympics, finishing in the final with a time of 4:07.88. At the same Olympics she won the gold medal in the Women's team sprint along with Jonna Sundling.

== Cross-country skiing results ==
All results are sourced from the International Ski Federation (FIS).

=== Olympic Games ===
- 5 medals – (1 gold, 2 silver, 2 bronze)

Year	Age	10 km individual	15 km skiathlon	30 km mass start	Sprint	4 × 5 km relay	Team sprint
2022	27	—	—	—	Silver	Bronze	Silver
2026	31	—	—	—	Bronze	—	Gold

=== World Championships ===
- 5 medals – (3 gold, 2 bronze)

Year	Age	10 km individual	15 km skiathlon	30 km mass start	Sprint	4 × 5 km relay	Team sprint
2019	24	—	—	—	6	—	Gold
2021	26	34	—	—	9	—	Gold
2023	28	10	—	—	Bronze	Bronze	—
2025	30	—	—	17	4	—	Gold

=== World Cup ===
==== Season titles ====
- 3 titles – (3 sprint)

Season
Season	Discipline
2022	Sprint
2023	Sprint
2026	Sprint

==== Season standings ====
Season	Age	Discipline standings				Ski Tour standings				
Season	Age	Overall	Distance	Sprint	U23	Nordic Opening	Tour de Ski	Ski Tour 2020	World Cup Final	Ski Tour Canada
2015	20	71	NC	38	9	—	—	—N/a	—N/a	—N/a
2016	21	65	NC	46	12	—	—	—N/a	—N/a	—
2017	22	91	—	55	15	—	—	—N/a	—	—N/a
2018	23	46	79	17	—N/a	—	—	—N/a	37	—N/a
2019	24	9	31	3rd place, bronze medalist(s)	—N/a	22	—	—N/a	8	—N/a
2020	25	30	60	9	—N/a	45	—	—	—N/a	—N/a
2021	26	13	19	4	—N/a	8	19	—N/a	—N/a	—N/a
2022	27	10	68	1st place, gold medalist(s)	—N/a	—N/a	—	—N/a	—N/a	—N/a
2023	28	8	30	1st place, gold medalist(s)	—N/a	—N/a	DNF	—N/a	—N/a	—N/a
2024	29	22	58	4	—N/a	—N/a	DNF	—N/a	—N/a	—N/a
2025	30	20	45	3rd place, bronze medalist(s)	—N/a	—N/a	DNF	—N/a	—N/a	—N/a
2026	31	3rd place, bronze medalist(s)	10	1st place, gold medalist(s)	—N/a	—N/a	14	—N/a	—N/a	—N/a

==== Individual podiums ====
- 6 victories – (6 WC)
- 36 podiums – (31 WC, 5 SWC)

No.	Season	Date	Location	Race	Level	Place
1	2017–18	13 January 2018	Dresden, Germany	1.2 km Sprint F	World Cup	2nd
2	2018–19	24 November 2018	Rukatunturi, Finland	1.4 km Sprint C	World Cup	2nd
3	2018–19	15 December 2018	Davos, Switzerland	1.5 km Sprint F	World Cup	3rd
4	2018–19	12 January 2019	Dresden, Germany	1.6 km Sprint F	World Cup	2nd
5	2018–19	19 January 2019	Otepää, Estonia	1.3 km Sprint C	World Cup	3rd
6	2018–19	9 February 2019	Lahti, Finland	1.4 km Sprint F	World Cup	3rd
7	2018–19	16 March 2019	Falun, Sweden	1.4 km Sprint F	World Cup	3rd
8	2018–19	22 March 2019	Quebec City, Canada	1.6 km Sprint F	Stage World Cup	2nd
9	2019–20	11 January 2020	Dresden, Germany	1.3 km Sprint F	World Cup	3rd
10	2020–21	27 November 2020	Rukatunturi, Finland	1.4 km Sprint C	Stage World Cup	2nd
11	2020–21	9 January 2021	Val di Fiemme, Italy	1.5 km Sprint F	Stage World Cup	2nd
12	2020–21	6 February 2021	Ulricehamn, Sweden	1.5 km Sprint F	World Cup	1st
13	2021–22	26 November 2021	Rukatunturi, Finland	1.4 km Sprint C	World Cup	1st
14	2021–22	3 December 2021	Lillehammer, Norway	1.6 km Sprint F	World Cup	1st
15	2021–22	11 December 2021	Davos, Switzerland	1.5 km Sprint F	World Cup	1st
16	2021–22	18 December 2021	Dresden, Germany	1.3 km Sprint F	World Cup	1st
17	2021–22	26 February 2022	Lahti, Finland	1.6 km Sprint F	World Cup	3rd
18	2021–22	11 March 2022	Falun, Sweden	1.4 km Sprint C	World Cup	3rd
19	2022–23	3 December 2022	Lillehammer, Norway	1.6 km Sprint F	World Cup	2nd
20	2022–23	31 December 2022	Val Müstair, Switzerland	1.5 km Sprint F	Stage World Cup	2nd
21	2022–23	21 January 2023	Livigno, Italy	1.2 km Sprint F	World Cup	2nd
22	2022–23	28 January 2023	Les Rousses, France	1.3 km Sprint C	World Cup	3rd
23	2022–23	3 February 2023	Toblach, Italy	1.4 km Sprint F	World Cup	2nd
24	2022–23	18 March 2023	Falun, Sweden	1.4 km Sprint F	World Cup	3rd
25	2023–24	27 January 2024	Goms, Switzerland	1.5 km Sprint F	World Cup	2nd
26	2023–24	10 February 2024	Canmore, Canada	1.3 km Sprint F	World Cup	2nd
27	2023–24	3 March 2024	Lahti, Finland	1.5 km Sprint F	World Cup	3rd
28	2024–25	30 November 2024	Rukatunturi, Finland	1.4 km Sprint C	World Cup	3rd
29	2024–25	18 January 2025	Les Rousses, France	1.3 km Sprint C	World Cup	2nd
30	2024–25	25 January 2025	Engadin, Switzerland	1.3 km Sprint F	World Cup	3rd
31	2024–25	1 February 2025	Cogne, Italy	1.3 km Sprint C	World Cup	1st
32	2024–25	19 March 2025	Tallinn, Estonia	1.4 km Sprint F	World Cup	2nd
33	2025–26	29 November 2025	Rukatunturi, Finland	1.4 km Sprint C	World Cup	3rd
34	2025–26	28 December 2025	Toblach, Italy	1.4 km Sprint F	Stage World Cup	3rd
35	2025–26	17 January 2026	Oberhof, Germany	1.2 km Sprint F	World Cup	3rd
48	2025–26	21 March 2026	(United States) Lake Placid, USA	1.5 km Sprint F	World Cup	3rd

==== Team podiums ====
- 8 victories – (8 TS)
- 14 podiums – (3 RL, 11 TS)

No.	Season	Date	Location	Race	Level	Place	Teammate(s)
1	2017–18	14 January 2018	Dresden, Germany	6 × 1.3 km Team Sprint F	World Cup	1st	Ingemarsdotter
2	2018–19	13 January 2019	Dresden, Germany	6 × 1.6 km Team Sprint F	World Cup	1st	Nilsson
3	2018–19	10 February 2019	Lahti, Finland	6 × 1.4 km Team Sprint C	World Cup	1st	Ingemarsdotter
4	2019–20	22 December 2019	Planica, Slovenia	6 × 1.2 km Team Sprint F	World Cup	1st	Svahn
5	2019–20	12 January 2020	Dresden, Germany	12 × 0.65 km Team Sprint F	World Cup	1st	Svahn
6	2019–20	1 March 2020	Lahti, Finland	4 × 5 km Relay C/F	World Cup	3rd	Kalla / Karlsson / Öhrn
7	2020–21	7 February 2021	Ulricehamn, Sweden	6 × 1.5 km Team Sprint F	World Cup	2nd	Svahn
8	2021–22	19 December 2021	Dresden, Germany	12 × 0.65 km Team Sprint F	World Cup	1st	Sundling
9	2022–23	11 December 2022	Beitostølen, Norway	4 × 5 km Mixed Relay C/F	World Cup	3rd	Poromaa / Karlsson / Halfvarsson
10	2022–23	22 January 2023	Livigno, Italy	6 × 1.2 km Team Sprint F	World Cup	1st	Svahn
11	2023–24	26 January 2024	Goms, Switzerland	4 × 5 km Mixed Relay C/F	World Cup	2nd	Häggström / Andersson / Anger
12	2024–25	31 January 2025	Cogne, Italy	6 × 1.3 km Team Sprint C	World Cup	2nd	Hagström
13	2024–25	22 March 2025	(Finland) Lahti	6 × 1.5 km Team Sprint F	World Cup	2nd	Hagström
14	2025–26	12 December 2025	Davos, Switzerland	12 × 0.6 km Team Sprint F	World Cup	1st	Sundling
