= Ukraine at the 2026 Winter Olympics =

- Flag of Ukraine
- IOC code: UKR
- NOC: National Olympic Committee of Ukraine
- Website: www.noc-ukr.org/en

in Milan and Cortina d'Ampezzo, Italy 6 February 2026 – 22 February 2026
- Competitors: 46 (25 men and 21 women) in 11 sports
- Flag bearers (opening): Vladyslav Heraskevych & Yelyzaveta Sydyorko
- Flag bearers (closing): Dmytro Kotovskyi & Anhelina Brykina
- Medals: Gold 0 Silver 0 Bronze 0 Total 0

Winter Olympics appearances (overview)
- 1994; 1998; 2002; 2006; 2010; 2014; 2018; 2022; 2026

Other related appearances
- Czechoslovakia (1924–1936); Poland (1924–1936); Romania (1924–1936); Soviet Union (1956–1988); Unified Team (1992)

Ukraine competed at the 2026 Winter Olympics in Milan and Cortina d'Ampezzo, Italy, from 6 to 22 February 2026.

This is the country's ninth appearance at the Olympic Winter Games. The Ukraine National Olympic team consisted of 46 athletes, which is one more than the number of participants at the last Winter Olympics. Heraskevych and Sydyorko were confirmed by the International Olympic Committee as flagbearers of the Ukraine National Olympic team at the 2026 Winter Olympics. Meanwhile, Dmytro Kotovskyi and Anhelina Brykina were the country's flagbearer during the closing ceremony.

Out of 46 participants, 13 have experience of competing at the Winter Youth Olympics, while 8 sportspeople compete in the sports that have never been part of the Youth Games and 5 other athletes were born before they would have been eligible for any Youth Games.

For the first time since 2010, Ukraine failed to secure a single Winter Olympic medal.

== Competitors ==
The following is the list of competitors participating in the Games by sport/discipline.

Sport	Men	Women	Total
Alpine skiing	1	1	2
Biathlon	5	5	10
Cross-country skiing	2	4	6
Figure skating	1	0	1
Freestyle skiing	4	5	9
Luge	6	4	10
Nordic combined	2	0	2
Short-track speed skating	1	1	2
Skeleton	1	0	1
Ski jumping	2	0	2
Snowboarding	0	1	1
Total	25	21	46

== Alpine skiing ==
Ukraine qualified one female and one male alpine skier through the basic quota.

Athlete	Event	Run 1		Run 2		Total	
Athlete	Event	Time	Rank	Time	Rank	Time	Rank
Dmytro Shepiuk	Men's downhill	—N/a				2:00.11	33
Dmytro Shepiuk	Men's super-G	—N/a				1:33.16	36
Dmytro Shepiuk	Men's giant slalom	1:22.99	43	1:17.37	39	2:40.36	40
Dmytro Shepiuk	Men's slalom	1:05.62	33	1:06.29	32	2:11.91	32
Anastasiya Shepilenko	Women's downhill	—N/a				1:47.70	32
Anastasiya Shepilenko	Women's super-G	—N/a				DNF	
Anastasiya Shepilenko	Women's giant slalom	1:08.97	44	1:15.09	39	2:24.06	39
Anastasiya Shepilenko	Women's slalom	DNF					

== Biathlon ==
Ukraine qualified five female and five male biathletes through the 2024–25 Biathlon World Cup score.

Men

Athlete	Event	Time	Misses	Rank
Anton Dudchenko	Individual	57:21.7	1 (0+1+0+0)	35
Taras Lesiuk	Individual	1:00:31.5	4 (1+2+0+1)	65
Vitalii Mandzyn	Individual	56:55.0	4 (0+1+1+2)	28
Dmytro Pidruchnyi	Individual	56:10.4	3 (0+3+0+0)	18
Bohdan Borkovskyi	Sprint	26:06.0	2 (1+1)	63
Anton Dudchenko	Sprint	27:37.6	3 (2+1)	88
Vitalii Mandzyn	Sprint	24:40.5	1 (0+1)	24
Dmytro Pidruchnyi	Sprint	24:47.9	2 (1+1)	27
Vitalii Mandzyn	Pursuit	33:56.0	3 (1+1+1+0)	16
Dmytro Pidruchnyi	Pursuit	34:13.2	2 (1+0+0+1)	20
Vitalii Mandzyn	Mass start	41:47.8	5 (0+0+2+3)	10
Dmytro Pidruchnyi	Mass start	42:31.7	5 (2+0+2+1)	17
Dmytro Pidruchnyi; Bohdan Borkovskyi; Vitalii Mandzyn; Taras Lesiuk	Team relay	1:25:07.4	14 (2+12)	16

Women

Athlete	Event	Time	Misses	Rank
Daryna Chalyk	Individual	47:14.8	3 (1+1+1+0)	61
Khrystyna Dmytrenko	Individual	44:06.1	1 (0+0+0+1)	18
Yuliia Dzhima	Individual	46:31.3	3 (0+0+0+3)	53
Oleksandra Merkushyna	Individual	44:03.9	1 (0+0+0+1)	17
Khrystyna Dmytrenko	Sprint	23:04.6	1 (1+0)	54
Yuliia Dzhima	Sprint	22:15.4	0 (0+0)	24
Olena Horodna	Sprint	24:11.3	2 (0+2)	76
Oleksandra Merkushyna	Sprint	22:51.8	1 (0+1)	42
Khrystyna Dmytrenko	Pursuit	34:33.9	3 (1+0+0+2)	45
Yuliia Dzhima	Pursuit	34:21.4	3 (0+1+1+1)	43
Oleksandra Merkushyna	Pursuit	34:45.4	5 (0+2+2+1)	48
Oleksandra Merkushyna; Yuliia Dzhima; Khrystyna Dmytrenko; Daryna Chalyk	Team relay	1:13:42.2	9 (0+9)	9

Mixed

Athlete	Event	Time	Misses	Rank
Dmytro Pidruchnyi; Vitalii Mandzyn; Olena Horodna; Oleksandra Merkushyna	Relay	1:06:52.1	0+8	8

== Cross-country skiing ==
Ukraine qualified one female and one male cross-country skier through the basic quota. Following the completion of the 2024–25 FIS Cross-Country World Cup, Ukraine qualified a further three female and one male athlete.

Distance
Men

Athlete	Event	Classical		Freestyle		Final		
Athlete	Event	Time	Rank	Time	Rank	Time	Deficit	Rank
Dmytro Drahun	Skiathlon	27:11.1	61	26:01.1	55	53:43.0	+7:32.0	59
Oleksandr Lisohor	Skiathlon	26:22.9	54	25:49.9	53	52:45.2	+6:34.2	53
Dmytro Drahun	10 kilometre freestyle	—N/a				24:20.3	+3:44.1	72
Oleksandr Lisohor	10 kilometre freestyle	—N/a				23:27.8	+2:51.6	61
Dmytro Drahun	50 kilometre classical	—N/a				2:33:29.1	+26:44.3	43
Oleksandr Lisohor	50 kilometre classical	—N/a				2:27:02.6	+20:17.8	40

Women

Athlete	Event	Classical		Freestyle		Final		
Athlete	Event	Time	Rank	Time	Rank	Time	Deficit	Rank
Anastasiia Nikon	Skiathlon	34:36.3	61	LAP				61
Sofiia Shkatula	Skiathlon	36:00.5	67	LAP				67
Daryna Myhal	Skiathlon	35:07.5	65	LAP				63
Yelizaveta Nopriienko	Skiathlon	LAP						70
Anastasiia Nikon	10 kilometre freestyle	—N/a				26:54.3	+4:05.1	67
Sofiia Shkatula	10 kilometre freestyle	—N/a				26:58.2	+4:09.0	69
Daryna Myhal	10 kilometre freestyle	—N/a				26:51.2	+4:02.0	65
Yelizaveta Nopriienko	10 kilometre freestyle	—N/a				27:56.4	+5:07.2	76
Anastasiia Nikon; Daryna Myhal; Sofiia Shkatula; Yelizaveta Nopriienko	4 × 7.5 kilometre relay	—N/a				LAP		16

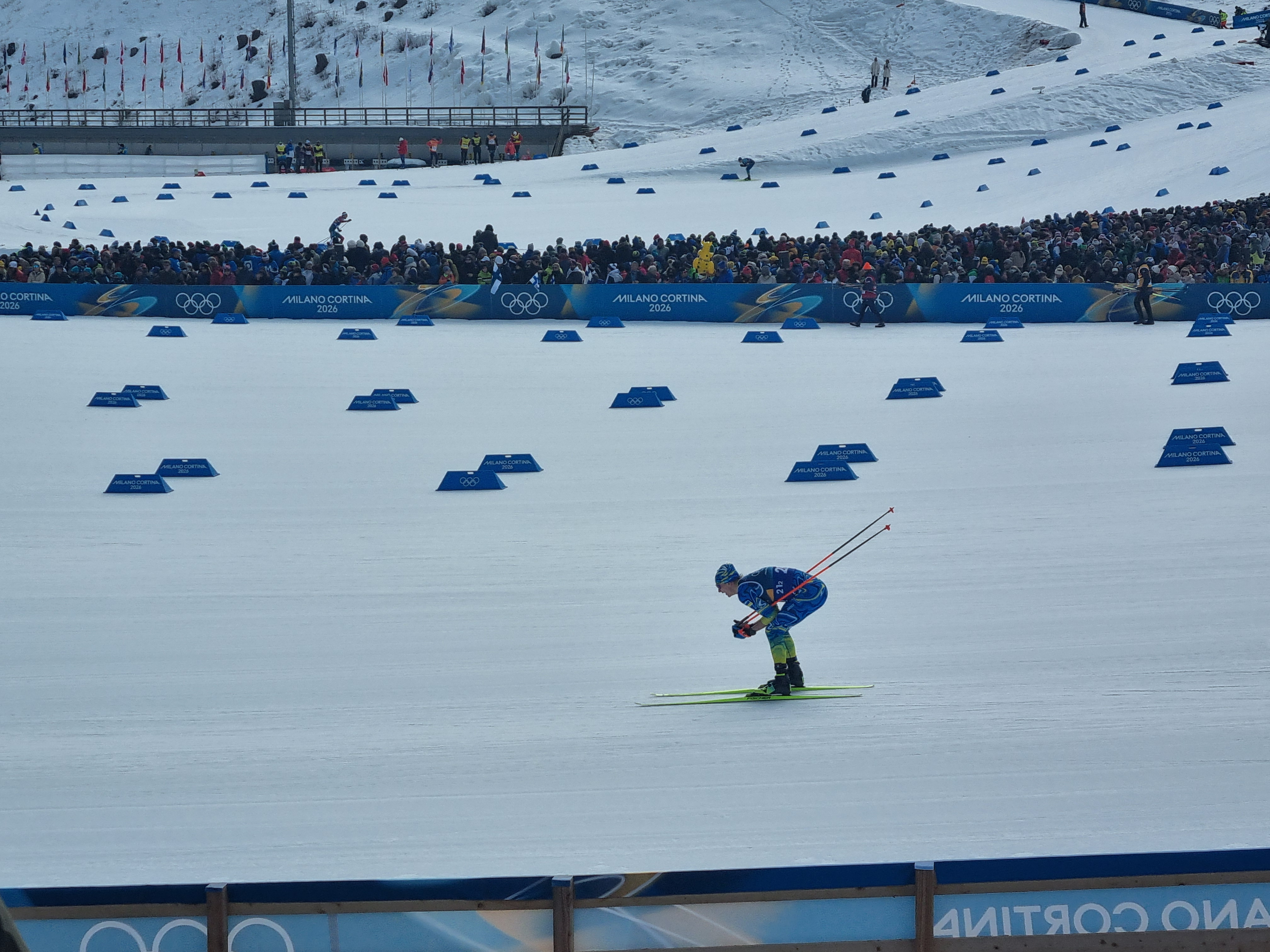
Oleksandr Lisohor competing in men's team sprint

Sprint

Athlete	Event	Qualification		Quarterfinal		Semifinal		Final	
Athlete	Event	Time	Rank	Time	Rank	Time	Rank	Time	Rank
Dmytro Drahun	Men's sprint	3:30.74	60	Did not advance					60
Oleksandr Lisohor	Men's sprint	3:36.57	70	Did not advance					70
Anastasiia Nikon	Women's sprint	4:07.37	59	Did not advance					59
Daryna Myhal	Women's sprint	4:27.57	81	Did not advance					81
Yelizaveta Nopriienko	Women's sprint	4:26.22	79	Did not advance					79
Sofiia Shkatula	Women's sprint	4:10.35	64	Did not advance					64
Dmytro Drahun; Oleksandr Lisohor	Men's team sprint	6:20.13	23	—N/a				Did not advance	23
Anastasiia Nikon; Sofiia Shkatula	Women's team sprint	7:32.35	20	—N/a				Did not advance	20

== Figure skating ==
Ukraine earned one quota in men's singles at the ISU Skate to Milano Figure Skating Qualifier 2025 in Beijing, China.

Athlete	Event	SP/SD		FP/FD		Total	
Athlete	Event	Points	Rank	Points	Rank	Points	Rank
Kyrylo Marsak	Men's singles	86.89	11 Q	137.28	23	224.17	19

== Freestyle skiing ==
Aerials
Men

Athlete	Event	Qualification						Final 1						Final 2	
Athlete	Event	Jump 1		Jump 2		Best		Jump 1		Jump 2		Best		Final 2	
Athlete	Event	Points	Rank	Points	Rank	Points	Rank	Points	Rank	Points	Rank	Points	Rank	Points	Rank
Yan Havriuk	Aerials	84.07	18	53.84	17	84.07	21	Did not advance							21
Dmytro Kotovskyi	Aerials	95.16	14	80.97	13	95.16	17	Did not advance							17
Maksym Kuznietsov	Aerials	68.88	23	64.60	15	68.88	23	Did not advance							23
Oleksandr Okipniuk	Aerials	112.67	6 **Q**	Bye				101.00	9	92.31	9	101.00	10	Did not advance	10

Women

Athlete	Event	Qualification						Final 1						Final 2	
Athlete	Event	Jump 1		Jump 2		Best		Jump 1		Jump 2		Best		Final 2	
Athlete	Event	Points	Rank	Points	Rank	Points	Rank	Points	Rank	Points	Rank	Points	Rank	Points	Rank
Anhelina Brykina	Aerials	79.84	13	75.50	6	75.50	13	Did not advance							13
Nelli Popovych	Aerials	43.46	25	64.22	13	64.22	19	Did not advance							19
Diana Yablonska	Aerials	55.44	21	69.89	11	69.89	18	Did not advance							18
Oksana Yatsiuk	Aerials	62.68	16	60.03	15	62.68	20	Did not advance							20

Mixed team

Total points in each round is shown in bold.

Athlete	Event	Final 1		Final 2	
Athlete	Event	Points	Rank	Points	Rank
Anhelina Brykina; Oleksandr Okipniuk; Dmytro Kotovskyi	Aerials	90.58; 76.92; 87.17; **254.67**	6	Did not advance	6

Park & Pipe

Athlete	Event	Qualification					Final				
Athlete	Event	Run 1	Run 2	Run 3	Best	Rank	Run 1	Run 2	Run 3	Best	Rank
Kateryna Kotsar	Women's big air	79.75	75.75	DNI	155.50	11 **Q**	82.00	72.00	74.00	156.00	10
Kateryna Kotsar	Women's slopestyle	36.03	50.78	—N/a	50.78	14	Did not advance				14

== Luge ==
Men

Athlete	Event	Run 1		Run 2		Run 3		Run 4		Total	
Athlete	Event	Time	Rank	Time	Rank	Time	Rank	Time	Rank	Time	Rank
Anton Dukach	Singles	53.748	13	53.712	11	54.188	22 Q	53.556	10	3:35.204	16
Andriy Mandziy	Singles	53.815	16	53.725	12	53.633	14 Q	53.601	13	3:34.774	12
Bohdan Babura; Danyil Martsinovskyi	Doubles	54.158	17	53.957	16	—N/a				1:48.115	16
Ihor Hoi; Nazarii Kachmar	Doubles	53.843	14	53.739	14	—N/a				1:47.582	14

Women

Athlete	Event	Run 1		Run 2		Run 3		Run 4		Total	
Athlete	Event	Time	Rank	Time	Rank	Time	Rank	Time	Rank	Time	Rank
Olena Smaha	Singles	53.619	17	54.027	19	53.678	16 Q	54.364	20	3:35.688	20
Yulianna Tunytska	Singles	53.713	18	53.626	18	53.884	18 Q	53.600	17	3:34.823	18
Oleksandra Mokh; Olena Stetskiv	Doubles	54.174	6	54.231	8	—N/a				1:48.405	7

Mixed team relay

Athlete	Event	Women's singles		Men's doubles		Men's singles		Women's doubles		Total	
Athlete	Event	Time	Rank	Time	Rank	Time	Rank	Time	Rank	Time	Rank
Yulianna Tunytska; Ihor Hoi / Nazarii Kachmar; Andriy Mandziy; Oleksandra Mokh / Olena Stetskiv	Team relay	56.392	6	57.025	8	55.498	6	57.259	7	3:46.174	6

== Nordic combined ==
Athlete	Event	Ski jumping			Cross-country		Total	
Athlete	Event	Distance	Points	Rank	Time	Rank	Time	Rank
Dmytro Mazurchuk	Individual normal hill/10 km	88.0	97.0	32	32:35.9	18	34:57.9	27
Dmytro Mazurchuk	Individual large hill/10 km	112.0	91.7	34	26:45.8	27	30:38.8	30
Oleksandr Shumbarets	Individual normal hill/10 km	89.5	98.6	31	33:58.1	29	36:14.1	30
Oleksandr Shumbarets	Individual large hill/10 km	114.5	104.0	30	27:49.3	31	30:53.3	31
Oleksandr Shumbarets; Dmytro Mazurchuk	Team sprint	103.0; 93.0	66.4; 63.4; 129.8	14	22:04.0; 23:05.2; 45:09.2	12	47:45.2	12

== Short-track speed skating ==
Ukraine qualified two short-track speed skaters (one per gender) after the conclusion of the 2025–26 ISU Short Track World Tour.

Athlete	Event	Heat		Quarterfinal		Semifinal		Final	
Athlete	Event	Time	Rank	Time	Rank	Time	Rank	Time	Rank
Oleh Handei	500 m	49.020	2 Q	41.164	4	Did not advance			15
Oleh Handei	1500 m	—N/a		2:58.831	4 ADV	2:18.408	4 FB	2:37.184	16
Yelyzaveta Sydorko	Women's 500 m	43.337 NR	4	Did not advance					21

== Skeleton ==
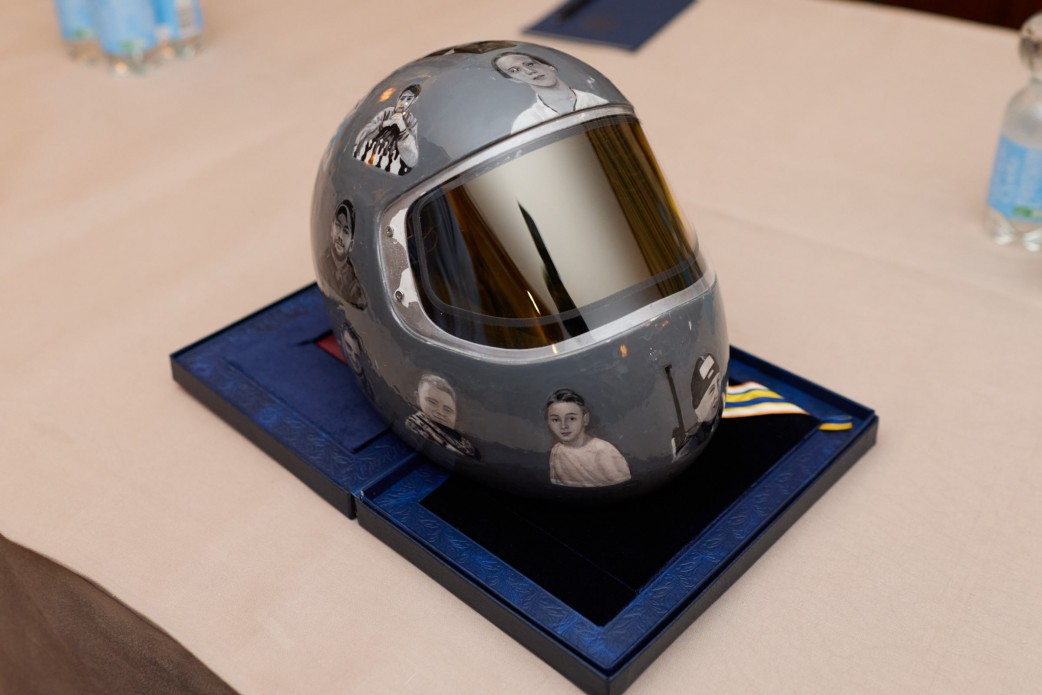
"Helmet of Remembrance" for which Heraskevych was disqualified

International Olympic Committee disqualified Vladyslav Heraskevych for continuing to wear a helmet featuring images of athletes killed during Russian invasion of Ukraine. He participated in all training runs wearing that helmet. Heraskevych's accreditation for the Winter Olympics was initially withdrawn by the IOC but later overturned.

Athlete	Event	Run 1		Run 2		Run 3		Run 4		Total	
Athlete	Event	Time	Rank	Time	Rank	Time	Rank	Time	Rank	Time	Rank
Vladyslav Heraskevych	Men's	Disqualified									

== Ski jumping ==
Athlete	Event	First round			Final round			Total	
Athlete	Event	Distance	Points	Rank	Distance	Points	Rank	Points	Rank
Vitaliy Kalinichenko	Men's normal hill	94.5	104.5	47	Did not advance				47
Vitaliy Kalinichenko	Men's large hill	120.5	103.4	44	Did not advance				44
Yevhen Marusiak	Men's normal hill	99.0	113.6	42	Did not advance				42
Yevhen Marusiak	Men's large hill	124.5	108.6	41	Did not advance				41

Athlete	Event	First round			Second round			Final round			Total	
Athlete	Event	Distance	Points	Rank	Distance	Points	Rank	Distance	Points	Rank	Points	Rank
Vitaliy Kalinichenko; Yevhen Marusiak	Super team large hill	242.5	208.1	14	Did not advance							14

== Snowboarding ==
Alpine

Athlete	Event	Qualification		Round of 16	Quarterfinal	Semifinal	Final	
Athlete	Event	Time	Rank	Opposition Time	Opposition Time	Opposition Time	Opposition Time	Rank
Annamari Dancha	Women's parallel giant slalom	1:39.39	29	Did not advance				29

== See also ==
- Ukraine at the 2026 Winter Paralympics
