= Johanna Matintalo =

Finnish cross-country skier (born 1996)

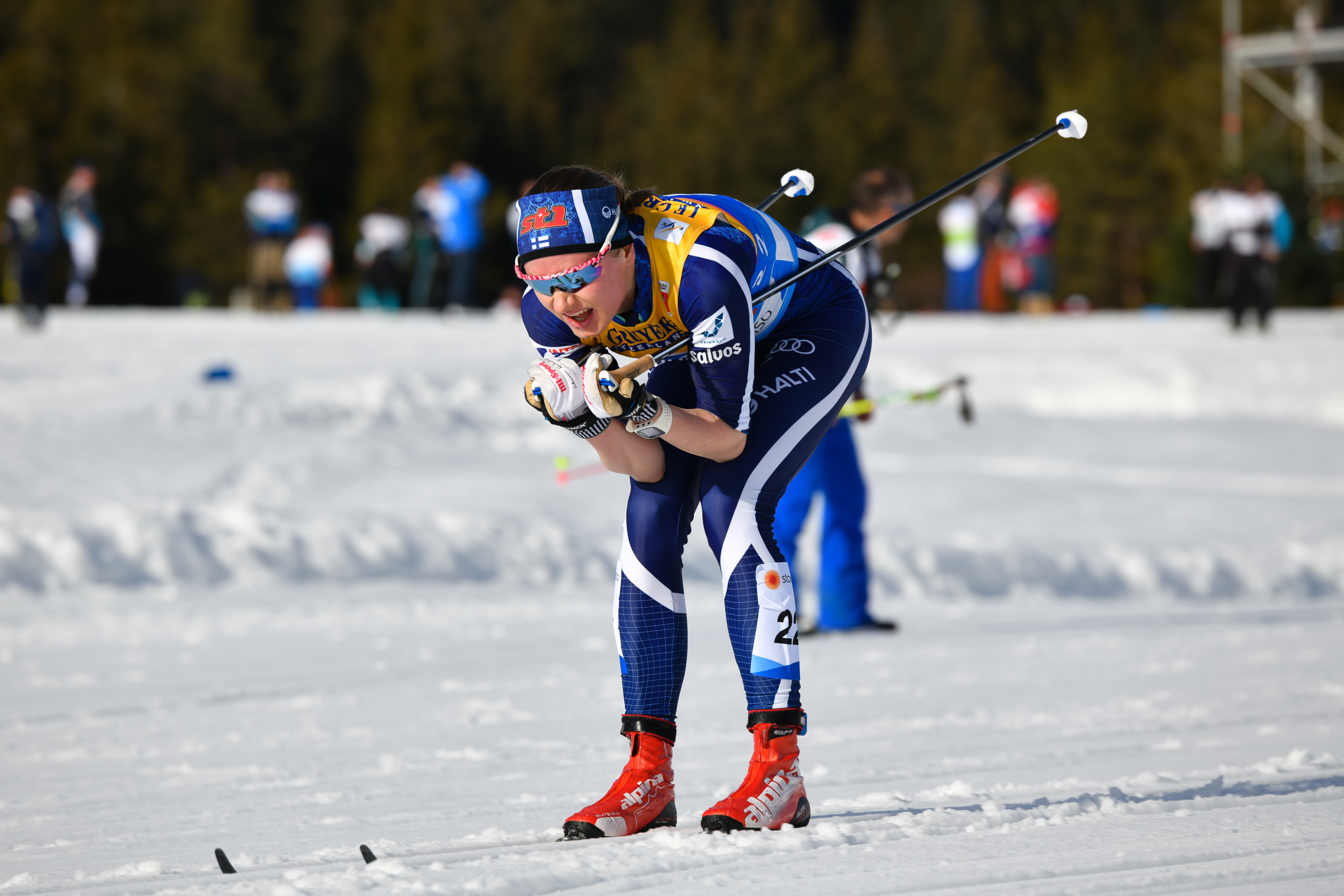
- Matintalo in 2019

Personal information
- Full name: Johanna Katariina Matintalo
- Nationality: Finland
- Born: 11 December 1996 (age 29) Pöytyä, Finland

Sport
- Sport: Skiing
- Club: Pöytyän Urheilijat

World Cup career
- Seasons: 11 – (2015, 2017–present)
- Indiv. starts: 112
- Indiv. podiums: 4
- Indiv. wins: 1
- Team starts: 12
- Team podiums: 5
- Team wins: 0
- Overall titles: 0 – (18th in 2022)
- Discipline titles: 0
Medal record
Women's cross-country skiing
Representing Finland
Olympic Games
| Bronze medal – third place | 2026 Milano Cortina | 4 × 7.5 km relay |
World Championships
| Bronze medal – third place | 2021 Oberstdorf | 4 × 5 km relay |
U23 World Championships
| Silver medal – second place | 2017 Park City | 15 km skiathlon |
- Updated on 25 January 2026

Johanna Katariina Matintalo (born 11 December 1996) is a Finnish cross-country skier and former track and field athlete. She set Finnish age group records as a middle-distance runner and was national champion in the women's 800 metres in 2013, but injuries and stagnating results led her to concentrate on skiing. As a skier, she won silver in the women's skiathlon at the 2017 World U23 Championships and has represented Finland in the 2017, 2019 and 2021 World Championships as well as the 2018 Winter Olympics in cross-country skiing, winning her first and to date, only medal in the 4 × 5 kilometre relay in the 2021 World Championships in Oberstdorf.

== Running career ==
Matintalo broke the national age-13 record in the 1000 metres in 2009 with her time of 3:01.01; the following year, she set age group records in both the 600 metres (1:34.21) and 1000 metres (2:58.51). In 2011, as a 14-year-old, she won silver in the 800 metres at the national senior championships; she improved her personal best by almost six seconds to 2:05.87, which was a national under-16 and under-18 record and the best time in the world by an under-16 runner that year. Matintalo won silver again in 2012 (2:07.43) before winning her only individual national title in 2013. She represented Finland in the women's 800 metres at the 2012 World Junior Championships in Barcelona but was eliminated in the heats; at the 2013 World Youth Championships in Donetsk, she survived the heats but went out in the semifinals.

Matintalo's development as a runner stagnated early, a problem exacerbated by injuries; she never improved her 800-meter personal best from 2011. In 2016, she decided to drop athletics and concentrate solely on her other sport, cross-country skiing; the injuries and lack of improvement, as well as Finland's strong skiing team and high-level skiing tradition, were all factors in this choice.

== Skiing career ==
Matintalo was a talented skier from an early age; as a youth, her training programs for skiing and running were compatible and supported each other. She represented Finland in cross-country skiing at the 2013 European Youth Olympic Winter Festival in Brașov, placing eighth in the 5 km classical race. In 2015, she competed in the World Junior Championships in Almaty, where she placed 16th in the under-20 skiathlon.

At higher levels, the increasing incompatibility of skiing training and running training made it impossible for Matintalo to continue to seriously pursue both sports indefinitely; as a skier, she needed much more upper-body strength, implying additional mass that would slow her down as a runner. In 2016, she decided to continue skiing at the cost of athletics; she moved from her hometown, Pöytyä in southwestern Finland, to Rovaniemi in the north for better training conditions. The move paid off, as she had a good 2016–17 season; at the 2017 World Junior Championships in Park City she won silver in the under-23 women's skiathlon despite skiing with an injured ankle.

Matintalo qualified for the February 2017 World Cup races in Otepää as a substitute for Riitta-Liisa Roponen, who had suffered a season-ending back injury. Matintalo had a breakthrough race, placing an unexpectedly good 12th in the 10 km classical; she was the second-best Finn behind Krista Pärmäkoski, defeating national team mainstays Kerttu Niskanen, Aino-Kaisa Saarinen, Laura Mononen and Anne Kyllönen. On the strength of this result, she was added to the Finnish team for the 2017 FIS Nordic World Ski Championships in Lahti, Finland; her championship debut was in the 15 km skiathlon, in which she placed 29th.

In the years since, Matintalo has made steady progress toward the top, particularly in competitions held in the classical style, with a handful of placements in the Top 10 in individual and team events. She won her first senior World Championship medal in the women's relay in the 2021 WCH in Oberstdorf, Germany, where the Finnish team (Matintalo, Jasmi Joensuu, Riitta-Liisa Roponen and Krista Pärmäkoski) somewhat unexpectedly seized the bronze medal ahead of competitors such as the United States, Germany, and Sweden.

In the 2021-22 season, Matintalo was in particularly good form in classic sprint events, reaching 4th place (at that point her career best) in Ruka and a 3rd place in Oberstdorf, her first individual podium. She also reached her career-best placements in the overall World Cup and the discipline cups. At the 2022 Winter Olympics, Matintalo skied the second leg for Finland in the 4 x 5 kilometre relay; the team lost the bronze medal by only .5 seconds. In March 2024, Johanna claimed another individual podium finishing 2nd in Falun. Kerttu Niskanen won the race in Falun rewriting history together with Johanna: it had been 16 since two Finnish skiers last received gold and silver medals in the World Cup.

Matintalo is in a relationship with fellow Finnish cross-country skier Lauri Vuorinen. At the 2021/22 season finale in Falun, the couple took the rare opportunity to compete together in a World Cup event when they took part in the mixed team sprint test event, finishing 11th.

== Cross-country skiing results ==
All results are sourced from the International Ski Federation (FIS).

=== Olympic Games ===
| Year | Age | 10 km individual | 15/20 km skiathlon | 30/50 km mass start | Sprint | 4 × 5/7.5 km relay | Team sprint |
|---|---|---|---|---|---|---|---|
| 2018 | 21 | — | 24 | 18 | 19 | — | — |
| 2022 | 25 | 14 | 12 | 23 | — | 4 | — |
| 2026 | 29 | — | — | DNF | 10 | Bronze | — |

=== World Championships ===
- 1 medal – (1 bronze)

| Year | Age | 10 km individual | 15/20 km skiathlon | 30/50 km mass start | Sprint | 4 × 5/7.5 km relay | Team sprint |
|---|---|---|---|---|---|---|---|
| 2017 | 20 | — | 29 | — | — | — | — |
| 2019 | 22 | 17 | 32 | — | — | — | — |
| 2021 | 24 | — | 30 | 13 | 26 | Bronze | — |
| 2023 | 26 | — | — | 25 | 26 | 4 | — |
| 2025 | 28 | 10 | — | — | — | 4 | — |

=== World Cup ===
==== Season standings ====
| Season | Age | Discipline standings | | | | Ski Tour standings | | | |
| Season | Age | Overall | Distance | Sprint | U23 | Nordic Opening | Tour de Ski | Ski Tour 2020 | World Cup Final |
|---|---|---|---|---|---|---|---|---|---|
| 2015 | 18 | NC | NC | — | NC | — | — | —N/a | —N/a |
| 2017 | 20 | 73 | 54 | — | 12 | — | — | —N/a | — |
| 2018 | 21 | 70 | 50 | 72 | 12 | 50 | — | —N/a | 30 |
| 2019 | 22 | 70 | 56 | 59 | 12 | 43 | — | —N/a | — |
| 2020 | 23 | 67 | 41 | NC | —N/a | 35 | — | — | —N/a |
| 2021 | 24 | 25 | 27 | 35 | —N/a | 35 | 17 | —N/a | —N/a |
| 2022 | 25 | 18 | 19 | 14 | —N/a | —N/a | 14 | —N/a | —N/a |
| 2023 | 26 | 41 | 35 | 36 | —N/a | —N/a | — | —N/a | —N/a |
| 2024 | 27 | 28 | 24 | 35 | —N/a | —N/a | – | —N/a | —N/a |
| 2025 | 28 | 52 | 40 | 38 | —N/a | —N/a | DNF | —N/a | —N/a |
| 2026 | 29 | 5 | 16 | 12 | —N/a | —N/a | 6 | —N/a | —N/a |

==== Individual podiums ====
- 1 win – (1 WC)
- 4 podiums – (3 WC, 1 SWC)

| No. | Season | Date | Location | Race | Level | Place |
|---|---|---|---|---|---|---|
| 1 | 2021–22 | 1 January 2022 | Oberstdorf, Germany | 1.2 km Sprint C | Stage World Cup | 3rd |
| 2 | 2022–23 | 9 December 2022 | Beitostølen, Norway | 1.3 km Sprint C | World Cup | 3rd |
| 3 | 2023–24 | 16 March 2024 | Falun, Sweden | 10 km Individual C | World Cup | 2nd |
| 4 | 2025–26 | 25 January 2026 | Goms, Switzerland | 20 km Mass Start C | World Cup | 1st |

==== Team podiums ====
- 5 podiums – (4 RL, 1 TS)

| No. | Season | Date | Location | Race | Level | Place | Teammates |
|---|---|---|---|---|---|---|---|
| 1 | 2018–19 | 9 December 2018 | Beitostølen, Norway | 4 × 5 km Relay C/F | World Cup | 3rd | Pärmäkoski / Roponen / Piippo |
| 2 | 2019–20 | 1 March 2020 | Lahti, Finland | 4 × 5 km Relay C/F | World Cup | 2nd | Niskanen / Mononen / Pärmäkoski |
| 3 | 2020–21 | 24 January 2021 | Lahti, Finland | 4 × 5 km Relay C/F | World Cup | 3rd | Niskanen / Mononen / Pärmäkoski |
| 4 | 2023–24 | 21 January 2024 | Oberhof, Germany | 4 × 7.5 km Relay C/F | World Cup | 3rd | Kyllönen / Pärmäkoski / Joensuu |
| 5 | 2023–24 | 1 March 2024 | Lahti, Finland | 6 × 1.3 km Team Sprint C | World Cup | 2nd | Pärmäkoski |
