= Cross-country skiing at the 2026 Winter Olympics – Women's 4 × 7.5 kilometre relay =

Women's 4 × 7.5 kilometre relay at the XXV Olympic Winter Games
- Cross-country skiing
- Venue: Cross country and biathlon center Fabio Canal, Tesero
- Date: 14 February 2026
- Competitors: 76 from 19 nations
- Teams: 19
- Winning time: 1:15:44.8

Medalists
1st place, gold medalist(s)		Kristin Austgulen Fosnæs; Astrid Øyre Slind; Karoline Simpson-Larsen; Heidi Weng	Norway
2nd place, silver medalist(s)		Linn Svahn; Ebba Andersson; Frida Karlsson; Jonna Sundling	Sweden
3rd place, bronze medalist(s)		Johanna Matintalo; Kerttu Niskanen; Vilma Ryytty; Jasmi Joensuu	Finland

The women's 4 × 7.5 kilometre relay competition in cross-country skiing at the 2026 Winter Olympics was held on 14 February, at the Cross country and biathlon center Fabio Canal in Tesero. Norway, represented by Kristin Austgulen Fosnæs, Astrid Øyre Slind, Karoline Simpson-Larsen, and Heidi Weng, won the event. Sweden won the silver medal, and Finland bronze.

== Background ==
The 2022 champions were the Russian Olympic Committee team which were barred from the 2026 Olympics after the Russian invasion of Ukraine. Germany were the silver medalists and Sweden were the bronze medalists. Sweden were the 2025 world champions in the relay, followed by Norway and Germany.

== Summary ==
Linn Svahn was skiing for Sweden in the first leg, and she was at the interchange with 10 second advantage, followed by Norway and Italy, and then the rest of the field. In the second leg, Ebba Andersson of Sweden fell twice. The first fall resulted in Astrid Øyre Slind of Norway and Caterina Ganz of Italy passing her; after the second fall, she lost a ski that she could not attach, and had to walk to an area where she could get a new ski. At the second interchange, Norway were leading 23 seconds and in the following, no other team came close to the gold medal contention. Finland were second, followed by Switzerland and Italy. Sweden were trailing by more than a minute. In the third leg, Vilma Ryytty of Finland kept second, and Frida Karlsson of Sweden almost caught up with Martina Di Centa of Italy. All other teams seemed out of medal contention. In the fourth leg, Italy dropped down and finished sixth, while Jonna Sundling of Sweden passed Jasmi Joensuu of Finland and finished second. Finland were third.

== Results ==
The race was started at 12:00.

Rank	Bib	Country	Time	Deficit
1st place, gold medalist(s)	2	Norway; Kristin Austgulen Fosnæs; Astrid Øyre Slind; Karoline Simpson-Larsen; Heidi Weng	1:15:44.8; 19:15.2; 19:32.4; 18:18.2; 18:39.0	
2nd place, silver medalist(s)	1	Sweden; Linn Svahn; Ebba Andersson; Frida Karlsson; Jonna Sundling	1:16:35.7; 19:07.6; 20:58.4; 18:06.6; 18:23.1	+50.9
3rd place, bronze medalist(s)	4	Finland; Johanna Matintalo; Kerttu Niskanen; Vilma Ryytty; Jasmi Joensuu	1:16:59.5; 19:19.8; 19:51.2; 18:43.1; 19:05.4	+1:14.7
4	3	Germany; Laura Gimmler; Katharina Hennig; Helen Hoffmann; Pia Fink	1:17:20.8; 19:48.2; 19:51.9; 18:56.5; 18:44.2	+1:36.0
5	6	United States; Julia Kern; Rosie Brennan; Novie McCabe; Jessie Diggins	1:17:37.0; 19:21.4; 20:10.0; 19:05.8; 18:59.8	+1:52.2
6	7	Italy; Iris De Martin Pinter; Caterina Ganz; Martina Di Centa; Federica Cassol	1:17:44.5; 19:14.8; 20:07.2; 18:40.9; 19:41.6	+1:59.7
7	5	Switzerland; Anja Weber; Nadja Kälin; Marina Kälin; Nadine Fähndrich	1:18:02.1; 19:29.2; 19:43.9; 19:25.9; 19:23.1	+2:17.3
8	9	Canada; Alison Mackie; Jasmine Drolet; Liliane Gagnon; Sonjaa Schmidt	1:19:20.7; 19:22.0; 21:13.9; 19:12.7; 19:32.1	+3:35.9
9	17	France; Julie Pierrel; Cloé Pagnier; Léonie Perry; Delphine Claudel	1:20:28.6; 19:54.8; 20:50.6; 18:36.8; 21:06.4	+4:43.8
10	18	Austria; Teresa Stadlober; Heidi Bucher; Katharina Brudermann; Lisa Achleitner	1:20:33.8; 19:17.5; 20:13.1; 19:51.0; 21:12.2	+4:49.0
11	8	Czech Republic; Kateřina Janatová; Sandra Schützová; Anna Milerská; Anna Marie Jaklová	1:20:58.6; 19:18.8; 20:48.1; 20:20.5; 20:31.2	+5:13.8
12	16	Poland; Monika Skinder; Eliza Rucka-Michałek; Aleksandra Kołodziej; Izabela Marcisz	1:21:21.6; 20:45.3; 20:11.7; 20:27.0; 19:57.6	+5:36.8
13	10	Estonia; Kaidy Kaasiku; Keidy Kaasiku; Mariel Merlii Pulles; Teesi Tuul	1:21:46.2; 20:02.8; 20:56.0; 19:52.4; 20:55.0	+6:01.4
14	11	Australia; Ellen Søhol Lie; Phoebe Cridland; Rosie Fordham; Maddie Hooker	1:25:06.1; 21:57.5; 22:12.5; 19:16.5; 21:39.6	+9:21.3
15	12	Kazakhstan; Xeniya Shalygina; Anna Melnik; Nadezhda Stepashkina; Darya Ryazhko	LAP; 21:58.7; 22:32.6	
16	14	Ukraine; Anastasiia Nikon; Daryna Myhal; Sofia Shkatula; Yelizaveta Nopriienko	LAP; 21:57.9; 22:28.4	
17	15	Latvia; Patrīcija Eiduka; Kitija Auziņa; Linda Kaparkalēja; Samanta Krampe	LAP; 20:49.9; 22:29.4	
18	19	Slovenia; Anja Mandeljc; Neža Žerjav; Tia Janežič; Lucija Medja	LAP; 21:31.8; 22:56.0	
19	13	China; Dilnigar Ilhamjan; Chi Chunxue; He Kaile; Wang Yundi	LAP; 23:39.4; 23:12.6	
