= Frida Karlsson =

Swedish cross-country skier (born 1999)

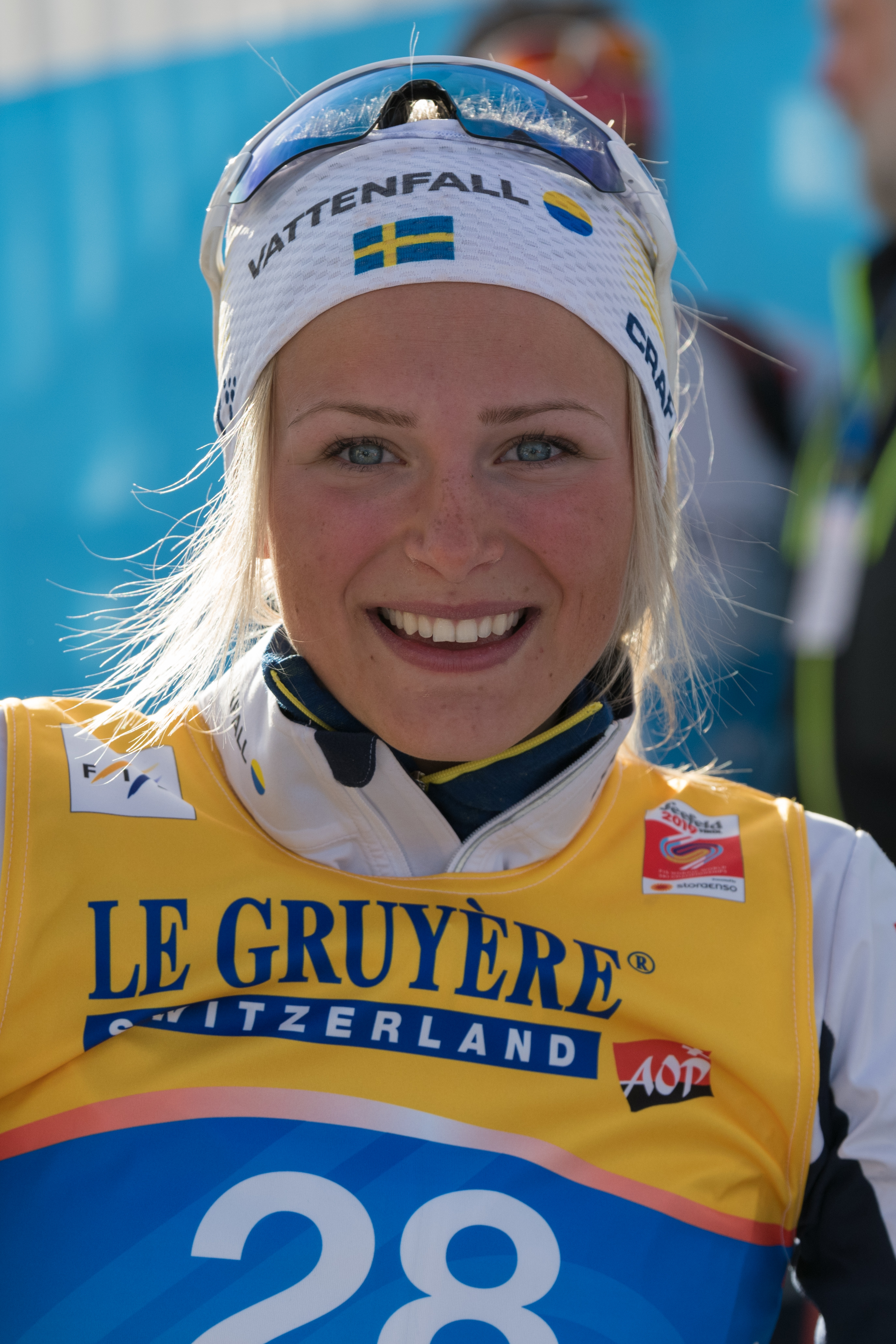
- Karlsson at the 2019 World Championships in Seefeld, Austria

Personal information
- Full name: Frida Elisabeth Karlsson
- Nationality: Sweden
- Born: 10 August 1999 (age 26) Sollefteå, Sweden

Sport
- Sport: Skiing
- Club: Sollefteå Skidor IF

World Cup career
- Seasons: 8 – (2019–present)
- Indiv. starts: 101
- Indiv. podiums: 31
- Indiv. wins: 16
- Team starts: 7
- Team podiums: 5
- Team wins: 2
- Overall titles: 0 – (3rd in 2024)
- Discipline titles: 1 – (1 U23: 2022)
Medal record
Women's cross-country skiing
Representing Sweden
International Nordic ski competitions
Event	1st	2nd	3rd
Olympic Games	2	1	1
World Championships	3	5	5
Total	5	6	6
Olympic Games
Gold medal – first place	2026 Milano Cortina	10 km freestyle
Gold medal – first place	2026 Milano Cortina	20 km skiathlon
Silver medal – second place	2026 Milano Cortina	4 × 7.5 km relay
Bronze medal – third place	2022 Beijing	4 × 5 km relay
World Championships
Gold medal – first place	2019 Seefeld	4 × 5 km relay
Gold medal – first place	2025 Trondheim	4 x 7.5 km relay
Gold medal – first place	2025 Trondheim	50 km freestyle
Silver medal – second place	2019 Seefeld	10 km classical
Silver medal – second place	2021 Oberstdorf	10 km freestyle
Silver medal – second place	2021 Oberstdorf	15 km skiathlon
Silver medal – second place	2023 Planica	10 km freestyle
Silver medal – second place	2023 Planica	15 km skiathlon
Bronze medal – third place	2019 Seefeld	30 km freestyle
Bronze medal – third place	2021 Oberstdorf	30 km classical
Bronze medal – third place	2023 Planica	30 km classical
Bronze medal – third place	2023 Planica	4 × 5 km relay
Bronze medal – third place	2025 Trondheim	10 km classical
Junior World Championships
Gold medal – first place	2018 Goms	10 km skiathlon
Gold medal – first place	2019 Lahti	5 km freestyle
Gold medal – first place	2019 Lahti	15 km classical
Bronze medal – third place	2018 Goms	Individual sprint
Bronze medal – third place	2018 Goms	4 × 3.33 km relay
Bronze medal – third place	2019 Lahti	4 × 3.33 km relay
- Updated on 12 February 2026

Frida Elisabeth Karlsson (born 10 August 1999) is a Swedish cross-country skier. She won a silver medal in the women's 10 km classical, bronze medal in the women's 30 km freestyle mass start, and gold as a member of the women's 4 × 5 km relay during the 2019 FIS World Championships in Seefeld in Tirol, Austria. With this win, she became the youngest cross-country skiing World Cup gold medalist in history.

In April 2018, Karlsson received a 50,000 Swedish kronor prize for promising new skiers from former skier Johan Olsson and a bank. The award also gave her the opportunity to use Olsson as a mentor. Karlsson is the daughter of former cross-country skier Ann-Marie Karlsson.

The 2022–2023 season saw Frida Karlsson winning the Tour de Ski.

Karlsson won the gold medal in 20 kilometre skiathlon at the 2026 Winter Olympics. A few days later she won the gold medal at the 10 kilometre freestyle.

Frida Krlsson was awarded the Victoria Award in the year 2026.

== Cross-country skiing results ==
All results are sourced from the International Ski Federation (FIS).

=== Olympic Games ===
- 4 medals – (2 gold, 1 silver, 1 bronze)

Year	Age	10 km individual	15/20 km skiathlon	30/50 km mass start	Sprint	4 × 5/7.5 km relay	Team sprint
2022	22	12	5	—	—	Bronze	—
2026	26	Gold	Gold	DNS	—	Silver	—

=== World Championships ===
- 13 medals – (3 gold, 5 silver, 5 bronze)

Year	Age	10 km individual	15/20 km skiathlon	30/50 km mass start	Sprint	4 × 5/7.5 km relay	Team sprint
2019	19	Silver	5	Bronze	—	Gold	—
2021	21	Silver	Silver	Bronze	—	6	—
2023	23	Silver	Silver	Bronze	—	Bronze	—
2025	25	Bronze	4	Gold	—	Gold	—

=== World Cup ===
==== Season titles ====
- 1 title – (1 U23)

Season
Season	Discipline
2022	Under-23

==== Season standings ====
Season	Age	Discipline standings				Ski Tour standings			
Season	Age	Overall	Distance	Sprint	U23	Nordic Opening	Tour de Ski	Ski Tour 2020	World Cup Final
2019	19	40	39	41	7	—	—	—N/a	9
2020	20	22	15	NC	3rd place, bronze medalist(s)	8	—	DNF	—N/a
2021	21	16	13	28	3rd place, bronze medalist(s)	4	DNF	—N/a	—N/a
2022	22	12	2nd place, silver medalist(s)	38	1st place, gold medalist(s)	—N/a	DNF	—N/a	—N/a
2023	23	6	8	32	—N/a	—N/a	1st place, gold medalist(s)	—N/a	—N/a
2024	24	3rd place, bronze medalist(s)	5	7	—N/a	—N/a	4	—N/a	—N/a
2025	25	41	25	73	—N/a	—N/a	—	—N/a	—N/a

==== Individual podiums ====
- 16 victories – (14 WC, 2 SWC)
- 32 podiums – (24 WC, 8 SWC)

No.	Season	Date	Location	Race	Level	Place
1	2019–20	7 March 2020	Oslo, Norway	30 km mass start C	World Cup	1st
2	2020–21	28 November 2020	Rukatunturi, Finland	10 km individual C	World Cup stage	2nd
3	2020–21	3 January 2021	Val Müstair, Switzerland	10 km pursuit F	World Cup stage	3rd
4	2021–22	27 November 2021	Rukatunturi, Finland	10 km individual C	World Cup	1st
5	2021–22	28 November 2021	Rukatunturi, Finland	10 km pursuit F	World Cup	2nd
6	2021–22	4 December 2021	Lillehammer, Norway	10 km individual F	World Cup	1st
7	2021–22	12 December 2021	Davos, Switzerland	10 km individual F	World Cup	3rd
8	2021–22	31 December 2021	Oberstdorf, Germany	10 km mass start F	World Cup stage	2nd
9	2022–23	26 November 2022	Rukatunturi, Finland	10 km individual C	World Cup	2nd
10	2022–23	27 November 2022	Rukatunturi, Finland	20 km pursuit F	World Cup	1st
11	2022–23	4 December 2022	Lillehammer, Norway	20 km mass start C	World Cup	1st
12	2022–23	10 December 2022	Beitostølen, Norway	10 km individual C	World Cup	3rd
13	2022–23	1 January 2023	Val Müstair, Switzerland	10 km pursuit C	World Cup stage	3rd
14	2022–23	3 January 2023	Oberstdorf, Germany	10 km individual C	World Cup stage	1st
15	2022–23	4 January 2023	Oberstdorf, Germany	20 km pursuit F	World Cup stage	1st
16	2022–23	7 January 2023	Val di Fiemme, Italy	15 km mass start C	World Cup stage	2nd
17	2022–23	31 December 2022 – 8 January 2023	(Switzerland) (Germany) (Italy) Tour de Ski	Overall standings	World Cup	1st
18	2023–24	25 November 2023	Rukatunturi, Finland	10 km individual C	World Cup	3rd
19	2023–24	6 January 2024	Val di Fiemme, Italy	15 km mass start C	World Cup stage	2nd
20	2023–24	19 January 2024	Oberhof, Germany	1.3 km sprint C	World Cup	2nd
21	2023–24	20 January 2024	Oberhof, Germany	20 km mass start C	World Cup	1st
22	2023–24	28 January 2024	Goms, Switzerland	20 km mass start F	World Cup	2nd
23	2023–24	11 February 2024	Canmore, Canada	20 km mass start C	World Cup	1st
24	2023–24	18 February 2024	(United States) Minneapolis, USA - Stifel Loppet Cup	10 km individual F	World Cup	2nd
25	2023–24	9 March 2024	Oslo, Norway	50 km mass start C	World Cup	1st
26	2024–25	29 November 2024	Rukatunturi, Finland	10 km individual C	World Cup	1st
27	2024–25	19 January 2025	Les Rousses, France	20 km mass start C	World Cup	1st
28	2025–26	28 November 2025	Rukatunturi, Finland	10 km individual C	World Cup	1st
29	2025–26	1 March 2026	Falun, Sweden	10 km + 10 km Skiathlon C/F	World Cup	3rd
30	2025–26	8 March 2026	Lahti, Finland	10 km individual C	World Cup	1st
31	2025–26	14 March 2026	Oslo, Norway	50 km mass start F	World Cup	1st
32	2025–26	20 March 2026	(United States) Lake Placid, USA	10 km Individual C	World Cup	2nd

==== Team podiums ====
- 2 victories – (2 RL)
- 5 podiums – (5 RL)

No.	Season	Date	Location	Race	Level	Place	Teammates
1	2019–20	1 March 2020	Lahti, Finland	4 × 5 km relay C/F	World Cup	3rd	Kalla / Öhrn / Dahlqvist
2	2021–22	5 December 2021	Lillehammer, Norway	4 × 5 km relay C/F	World Cup	2nd	Ribom / Andersson / Olsson
3	2022–23	11 December 2022	Beitostølen, Norway	4 × 5 km mixed relay C/F	World Cup	3rd	Dahlqvist / Poromaa / Halfvarsson
4	2023–24	21 January 2024	Oberhof, Germany	4 × 7.5 km relay C/F	World Cup	1st	Svahn / Andersson / Sundling
5	2023–24	26 January 2024	Goms, Switzerland	4 × 5 km mixed relay C/F	World Cup	1st	Poromaa / Burman / Svahn
