= Katharina Hennig Dotzler =

German cross-country skier (born 1996)

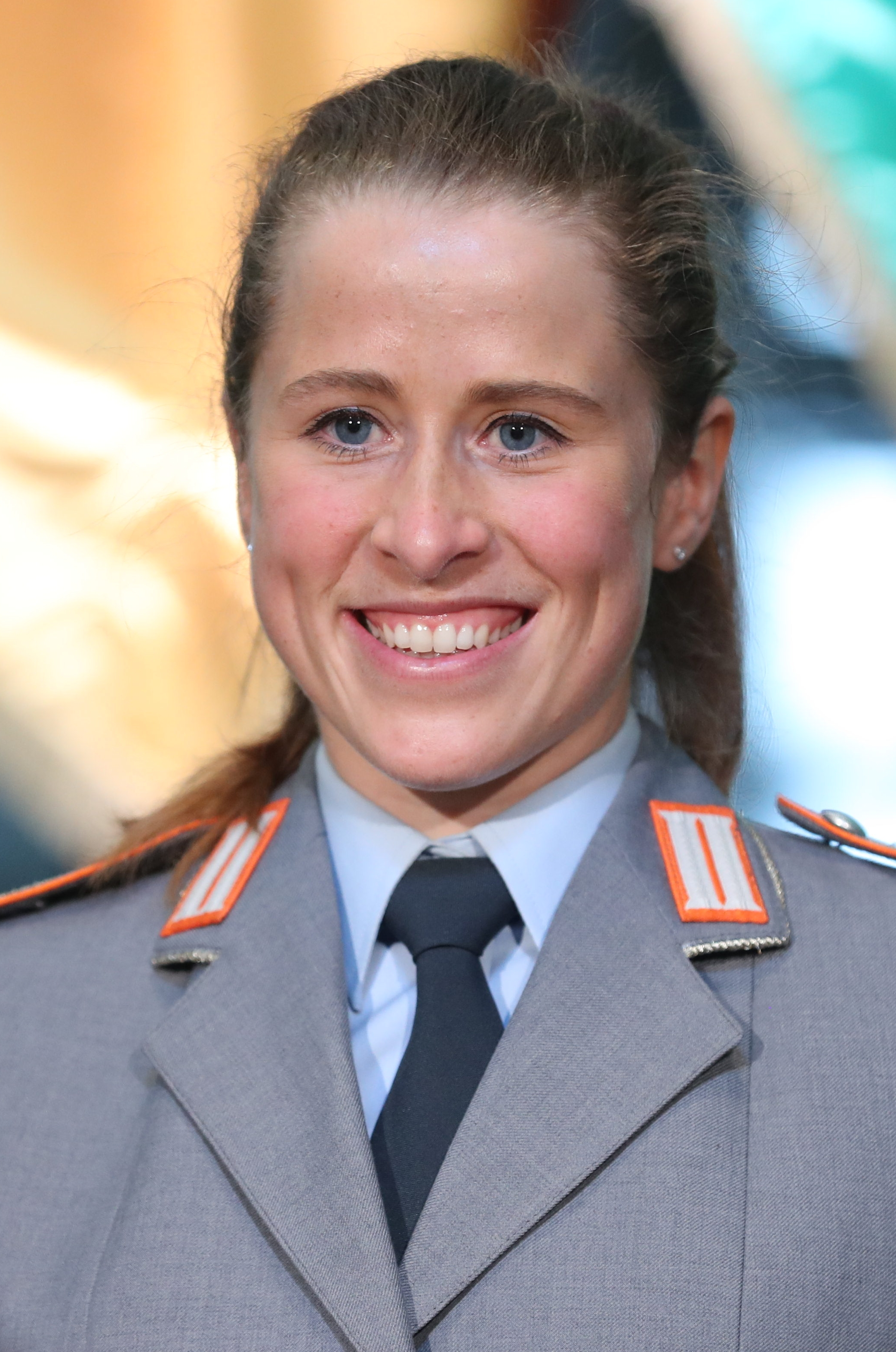
- Katharina Hennig in 2022

Personal information
- Nationality: Germany
- Born: 14 June 1996 (age 30) Annaberg-Buchholz, Germany
- Height: 1.63 m (5 ft 4 in)

Sport
- Sport: Skiing
- Club: WSC Erzgebirge Oberwiesenthal

World Cup career
- Seasons: 8 – (2017–present)
- Indiv. starts: 150
- Indiv. podiums: 11
- Indiv. wins: 1
- Team starts: 16
- Team podiums: 5
- Team wins: 0
- Overall titles: 0 – (7th in 2023)
- Discipline titles: 0
Medal record
Women's cross-country skiing
Representing Germany
Olympic Games
Gold medal – first place	2022 Beijing	Team sprint
Silver medal – second place	2022 Beijing	4 × 5 km relay
World Championships
Silver medal – second place	2023 Planica	4 × 5 km relay
Bronze medal – third place	2025 Trondheim	4 x 7.5 km relay
U23 World Championships
Bronze medal – third place	2019 Lahti	15 km classical
Junior World Championships
Silver medal – second place	2016 Râșnov	10 km freestyle
Bronze medal – third place	2013 Liberec	4 × 3.33 km relay
Bronze medal – third place	2015 Almaty	4 × 3.33 km relay
- Updated on 9 March 2024

Katharina Hennig Dotzler (born 14 June 1996) is a German cross-country skier who represents the club WSC Ergebirge Oberwiesenthal. She resides in Königswalde. Her novel achievements to date are the winning gold medal in the team sprint and the silver medal in the 4 × 5 km relay at the 2022 Winter Olympics in Beijing, China and silver medal in the 4 × 5 km relay at the 2023 World Champions in Planica, Slovenia.

She belonged to SV Neudorf until 2011 and then started to compete for WSC Erzgebirge Oberwiesenthal in 2011. At the Junior World Championships she won bronze medals with the German women's relay team in 2013 and 2015. Her best result at the Junior World Championships was the silver medal in the 10 km freestyle race behind Sweden Ebba Andersson in Rasnov, Romania. She made her World Cup debut on 24 January 2016 in Nové Město, Czech Republic. In January 2017, she achieved her first World Cup podium finish in Ulricehamn, finishing second in the team relay.

She competed at the FIS Nordic World Ski Championships 2017 in Lahti, Finland. In Lahti, her best finishes were 11th in skiathlon and sixth in team relay.

She placed ninth in the 50 km classical race at the 2026 Winter Olympics.

== Cross-country skiing results ==
All results are sourced from the International Ski Federation (FIS).

=== Olympic Games ===
- 2 medals – (1 gold, 1 silver)

Year	Age	10 km individual	15/20 km skiathlon	30/50 km mass start	Sprint	4 × 5/7.5 km relay	Team sprint
2018	21	—	22	19	27	6	—
2022	25	5	15	—	—	Silver	Gold
2026	29	—	30	9	—	4	—

=== World Championships ===
- 2 medals – (1 silver, 1 bronze)

Year	Age	10 km individual	15/20 km skiathlon	30/50 km mass start	Sprint	4 × 5/7.5 km relay	Team sprint
2017	20	27	11	19	—	6	—
2019	22	11	16	21	—	4	—
2021	24	—	29	18	27	5	—
2023	26	11	4	7	—	Silver	—
2025	28	7	—	—	—	Bronze	6

=== World Cup ===
==== Season standings ====
Season	Age	Discipline standings				Ski Tour standings			
Season	Age	Overall	Distance	Sprint	U23	Nordic Opening	Tour de Ski	Ski Tour 2020	World Cup Final
2017	20	43	32	NC	6	27	DNF	—N/a	21
2018	21	39	23	69	9	40	21	—N/a	27
2019	22	31	14	70	4	28	DNF	—N/a	17
2020	23	18	12	48	—N/a	27	8	—	—N/a
2021	24	11	6	54	—N/a	20	8	—N/a	—N/a
2022	25	11	7	30	—N/a	—N/a	9	—N/a	—N/a
2023	26	7	7	33	—N/a	—N/a	5	—N/a	—N/a
2024	27	11	10	33	—N/a	—N/a	11	—N/a	—N/a
2025	28	7	7	47	—N/a	—N/a	—	—N/a	—N/a

==== Individual podiums ====
- 1 victory – (1 SWC)
- 10 podiums – (6 WC, 4 SWC)

No.	Season	Date	Location	Race	Level	Place
1	2019–20	3 January 2020	Val di Fiemme, Italy	10 km Mass Start C	Stage World Cup	3rd
2	2020–21	8 January 2021	Val di Fiemme, Italy	10 km Mass Start C	Stage World Cup	2nd
3	2021–22	27 November 2021	Rukatunturi, Finland	10 km Individual C	World Cup	3rd
4	2022–23	26 November 2022	Rukatunturi, Finland	10 km Individual C	World Cup	3rd
5	2022–23	2 December 2022	Lillehammer, Norway	10 km Individual F	World Cup	2nd
6	2022–23	7 January 2023	Val di Fiemme, Italy	15 km Mass Start C	Stage World Cup	1st
7	2022–23	17 March 2023	Falun, Sweden	10 km Individual C	World Cup	2nd
8	2022–23	26 March 2023	Lahti, Finland	20 km Mass Start C	World Cup	3rd
9	2023–24	6 January 2024	Val di Fiemme, Italy	15 km Mass Start C	Stage World Cup	3rd
10	2023–24	20 January 2024	Oberhof, Germany	20 km Mass Start C	World Cup	2nd
11	2023–24	9 March 2024	Oslo, Norway	50 km Mass Start C	World Cup	3rd

==== Team podiums ====
- 5 podiums – (4 RL, 1 TS)

No.	Season	Date	Location	Race	Level	Place	Teammates
1	2016–17	22 January 2017	Ulricehamn, Sweden	4 × 5 km Relay C/F	World Cup	2nd	Böhler / Carl / Ringwald
2	2022–23	19 March 2023	Falun, Sweden	4 × 5 km Mixed Relay C/F	World Cup	3rd	Kuchler / Sossau / Carl
3	2023–24	3 December 2023	Gällivare, Sweden	4 × 7.5 km Relay C/F	World Cup	2nd	Gimmler / Fink / Carl
4	2023–24	21 January 2024	Oberhof, Germany	4 × 7.5 km Relay C/F	World Cup	2nd	Sauerbrey / Fink / Carl
5	2023–24	1 March 2024	Lahti, Finland	6 × 1.3 km Team Sprint C	World Cup	3rd	Gimmler
