= Cross-country skiing at the 2026 Winter Olympics – Women's 20 kilometre skiathlon =

Women's 20 kilometre skiathlon at the XXV Olympic Winter Games
- Cross-country skiing
- Venue: Cross country and biathlon center Fabio Canal, Tesero
- Date: 7 February 2026
- Competitors: 70 from 26 nations
- Winning time: 53:45.2

Medalists
1st place, gold medalist(s)		Frida Karlsson	Sweden
2nd place, silver medalist(s)		Ebba Andersson	Sweden
3rd place, bronze medalist(s)		Heidi Weng	Norway

The women's 20 kilometre skiathlon competition in cross-country skiing at the 2026 Winter Olympics was held on 7 February, at the Cross country and biathlon center Fabio Canal in Tesero. Frida Karlsson of Sweden won the race, and her teammate Ebba Andersson finished second. Heidi Weng of Norway won the bronze medal. For Karlsson, it was the first individual Olympic medal and the first gold (after a team bronze in 2022). It was also the first individual Olympic medal for Andersson.

== Background ==
At the previous Olympics, the women's skiathlon was 15 km; it was extended to 20 km for the 2026 Winter Olympics by FIS to match men's and women's event distances. The 2022 champion, Therese Johaug, retired from competitions, the silver medalist Natalya Nepryayeva took a maternity leave and effectively stopped competing, while the bronze medalist, Teresa Stadlober, qualified for the event. Jessie Diggins was leading both overall and distance standings of the FIS Cross-Country World Cup before the Olympics. Ebba Andersson was the 2025 world champion in the event.

== Results ==
The race was started at 13:00.

Rank	Bib	Name	Country	10 km classic	Rank	Pitstop	10 km free	Rank	Finish time	Deficit
1st place, gold medalist(s)	8	Frida Karlsson	Sweden	27:24.4	1	31.1	25:49.7	1	53:45.2	
2nd place, silver medalist(s)	4	Ebba Andersson	Sweden	27:25.3	3	29.8	26:41.1	4	54:36.2	+51.0
3rd place, bronze medalist(s)	7	Heidi Weng	Norway	28:03.6	5	33.5	26:34.8	2	55:11.9	+1:26.7
4	16	Nadja Kälin	Switzerland	28:05.4	8	31.4	26:59.9	6	55:36.7	+1:51.5
5	11	Kerttu Niskanen	Finland	28:04.2	6	31.0	27:04.0	7	55:39.2	+1:54.0
6	6	Astrid Øyre Slind	Norway	27:25.0	2	32.1	27:44.2	13	55:41.3	+1:56.1
7	14	Kateřina Janatová	Czech Republic	28:15.4	9	29.0	27:14.6	8	55:59.0	+2:13.8
8	1	Jessie Diggins	United States	28:52.8	15	34.4	26:39.1	3	56:06.3	+2:21.1
9	5	Teresa Stadlober	Austria	28:53.9	17	30.5	26:47.2	5	56:11.6	+2:26.4
10	12	Kristin Austgulen Fosnæs	Norway	28:04.9	7	31.8	27:48.9	16	56:25.6	+2:40.4
11	13	Jonna Sundling	Sweden	27:57.6	4	34.5	28:17.4	22	56:49.5	+3:04.3
12	9	Pia Fink	Germany	28:49.5	14	30.3	27:30.3	9	56:50.1	+3:04.9
13	3	Karoline Simpson-Larsen	Norway	28:49.0	13	33.3	27:35.5	10	56:57.8	+3:12.6
14	2	Moa Ilar	Sweden	28:18.3	10	29.9	28:38.0	29	57:26.2	+3:41.0
15	20	Vilma Ryytty	Finland	28:42.8	12	32.8	28:21.7	24	57:37.3	+3:52.1
16	23	Léonie Perry	France	29:20.2	25	40.6	27:39.6	11	57:40.4	+3:55.2
17	17	Dariya Nepryaeva	Individual Neutral Athletes	29:01.4	20	32.2	28:07.7	19	57:41.3	+3:56.1
18	10	Helen Hoffmann	Germany	29:05.5	23	35.3	28:03.8	18	57:44.6	+3:59.4
19	32	Marina Kälin	Switzerland	28:55.0	18	30.3	28:21.2	23	57:46.5	+4:01.3
20	18	Krista Pärmäkoski	Finland	29:38.6	28	27.6	27:40.5	12	57:46.7	+4:01.5
21	33	Julie Pierrel	France	29:04.8	22	30.8	28:11.9	20	57:47.5	+4:02.3
22	25	Alison Mackie	Canada	29:21.2	26	36.4	27:50.7	17	57:48.3	+4:03.1
23	28	Patrīcija Eiduka	Latvia	29:42.1	29	33.9	27:46.4	14	58:02.4	+4:17.2
24	19	Julia Kern	United States	29:06.2	24	29.0	28:27.2	27	58:02.4	+4:17.2
25	21	Anja Weber	Switzerland	29:00.8	19	31.5	28:33.5	28	58:05.8	+4:20.6
26	48	Novie McCabe	United States	29:43.5	31	36.1	27:46.5	15	58:06.1	+4:20.9
27	42	Cloé Pagnier	France	29:03.1	21	33.0	28:53.3	33	58:29.4	+4:44.2
28	37	Martina Di Centa	Italy	29:37.9	27	31.7	28:25.6	26	58:35.2	+4:50.0
29	31	Eliza Rucka-Michałek	Poland	29:52.4	32	30.7	28:12.4	21	58:35.5	+4:50.3
30	15	Katharina Hennig Dotzler	Germany	28:37.8	11	30.7	29:37.1	39	58:45.6	+5:00.4
31	45	Delphine Claudel	France	30:04.5	38	30.4	28:25.4	25	59:00.3	+5:15.1
32	49	Sandra Schützová	Czech Republic	29:53.5	33	32.2	28:52.8	32	59:18.5	+5:33.3
33	24	Katherine Sauerbrey	Germany	30:05.0	39	34.3	28:47.6	31	59:26.9	+5:41.7
34	44	Hanna Karaliova	Individual Neutral Athletes	30:00.5	35	32.2	29:12.9	34	59:45.6	+6:00.4
35	38	Masae Tsuchiya	Japan	30:05.6	40	31.0	29:13.8	35	59:50.4	+6:05.2
36	34	Anna Comarella	Italy	30:06.1	41	32.0	29:15.6	36	59:53.7	+6:08.5
37	29	Rosie Brennan	United States	28:53.4	16	34.2	30:38.4	49	1:00:06.0	+6:20.8
38	47	Jasmine Drolet	Canada	29:42.9	30	36.3	29:59.6	42	1:00:18.8	+6:33.6
39	39	Barbora Havlíčková	Czech Republic	30:04.0	37	32.0	29:52.5	41	1:00:28.5	+6:43.3
40	22	Vilma Nissinen	Finland	29:54.8	34	33.1	30:09.8	43	1:00:37.7	+6:52.5
41	40	Monika Skinder	Poland	30:46.5	44	32.9	29:46.8	40	1:01:06.2	+7:21.0
42	51	Anna Pryce	Great Britain	30:03.4	36	38.8	30:27.3	47	1:01:09.5	+7:24.3
43	36	Kaidy Kaasiku	Estonia	31:25.8	48	31.9	29:20.8	37	1:01:18.5	+7:33.3
44	27	Gina del Rio	Andorra	30:46.0	43	30.3	30:19.7	46	1:01:36.0	+7:50.8
45	30	Katherine Stewart-Jones	Canada	30:07.6	42	34.7	31:05.1	50	1:01:47.4	+8:02.2
46	46	Fabienne Alder	Switzerland	30:58.3	45	36.8	30:16.4	45	1:01:51.5	+8:06.3
47	41	Keidy Kaasiku	Estonia	32:00.3	51	30.1	29:21.3	38	1:01:51.7	+8:06.5
48	26	Maria Gismondi	Italy	31:31.4	49	29.6	30:10.9	44	1:02:11.9	+8:26.7
49	35	Rosie Fordham	Australia	33:00.8	56	30.8	28:46.2	30	1:02:17.8	+8:32.6
50	53	Amelia Wells	Canada	31:22.7	47	34.5	30:32.2	48	1:02:29.4	+8:44.2
51	50	Anna Milerská	Czech Republic	31:21.7	46	33.5	31:09.2	51	1:03:04.4	+9:19.2
52	52	Sophia Tsu Velicer	Chinese Taipei	31:45.7	50	33.4	31:38.4	52	1:03:57.5	+10:12.3
53	59	Xeniya Shalygina	Kazakhstan	32:18.3	52	36.2	Lapped			
54	56	Lee Eui-jin	South Korea	32:24.9	53	31.6	Lapped			
55	58	Chi Chunxue	China	32:27.7	54	35.7	Lapped			
56	66	Neža Žerjav	Slovenia	32:53.4	55	37.3	Lapped			
57	55	Ellen Søhol Lie	Australia	33:25.7	57	32.2	Lapped			
58	43	Phoebe Cridland	Australia	33:39.0	58	34.6	Lapped			
59	61	Maddie Hooker	Australia	33:58.1	60	33.6	Lapped			
60	54	Nadezhda Stepashkina	Kazakhstan	33:53.1	59	32.1	Lapped			
61	60	Anastasiia Nikon	Ukraine	34:00.7	61	35.6	Lapped			
62	63	Wang Yundi	China	34:14.1	63	42.6	Lapped			
63	65	Daryna Myhal	Ukraine	34:34.5	66	33.0	Lapped			
64	67	He Kaile	China	34:25.7	64	36.7	Lapped			
65	57	Han Da-som	South Korea	34:11.2	62	55.3	Lapped			
66	68	Teiloora Ojaste	Estonia	34:33.2	65	43.0	Lapped			
67	64	Sofiia Shkatula	Ukraine	35:27.3	67	33.2	Lapped			
68	62	Dilnigar Ilhamjan	China	35:41.1	68	34.0	Lapped			
69	70	Katya Galstyan	Armenia	35:41.9	69	38.7	Lapped			
70	69	Yelizaveta Nopriienko	Ukraine	36:04.2	70	LAP	Lapped			
