= Yelizaveta Nopriienko =

Ukrainian cross-country skier

Personal information
- Full name: Yelizaveta Oleksandrivna Nopriienko
- Born: 6 June 1998 (age 28)
- Height: 163 cm (5 ft 4 in)

Sport
- Sport: Skiing

World Cup career
- Seasons: 2 (2025—)
- Updated on 8 March 2026

Yelizaveta Oleksandrivna Nopriienko (Ukrainian: Єлизавета Олександрівна Ноприєнко; born 6 June 1998) is a cross-country skier from Ukraine. She represented Ukraine at the 2026 Winter Olympics.

== Cross-country skiing results ==
All results are sourced from the International Ski Federation (FIS).

=== Olympic Games ===
Year	Age	15 km individual	30 km skiathlon	50 km mass start	Sprint	4 × 10 km relay	Team sprint
2026	28	76	70	—	79	16	—

=== World Championships ===
Year	Age	15/10 km individual	30/20 km skiathlon	50 km mass start	Sprint	4 × 10/7.5 km relay	Team sprint
2025	27	—	57	—	80	15	—

=== World Cup ===
==== Season standings ====
Season	Age	Discipline standings				Ski Tour standings				
Season	Age	Overall	Distance	Sprint	U23	Nordic Opening	Tour de Ski	Ski Tour 2020	World Cup Final	Ski Tour Canada
2025	27	NC	NC	NC	NC	—N/a	—	—N/a	—N/a	—N/a

== Personal life ==
She studied at the National Pedagogical Drahomanov University.
