= Sofiia Shkatula =

Ukrainian cross-country skier

Personal information
- Full name: Sofiia Serhiivna Shkatula
- Born: 20 May 2007 (age 19)
- Height: 165 cm (5 ft 5 in)

Sport
- Sport: Skiing

World Cup career
- Seasons: 4 (2023—)
- Updated on 16 March 2026

Sofiia Serhiivna Shkatula (Ukrainian: Софія Сергіївна Шкатула; born 20 May 2007) is a cross-country skier from Ukraine. She represented Ukraine at the 2026 Winter Olympics.

At the youth and junior level, she competed at the 2024 Winter Youth Olympics and 2025 European Youth Olympic Winter Festival. Her trainer is Lada Nesterenko.

== Cross-country skiing results ==
All results are sourced from the International Ski Federation (FIS).

=== Olympic Games ===
| Year | Age | 15 km individual | 30 km skiathlon | 50 km mass start | Sprint | 4 × 10 km relay | Team sprint |
|---|---|---|---|---|---|---|---|
| 2026 | 18 | 69 | 67 | — | 64 | 16 | 20 |

=== World Championships ===
| Year | Age | 15/10 km individual | 30/20 km skiathlon | 50 km mass start | Sprint | 4 × 10/7.5 km relay | Team sprint |
|---|---|---|---|---|---|---|---|
| 2025 | 17 | 61 | — | — | 71 | 15 | 18 |

=== World Cup ===
==== Season standings ====
| Season | Age | Discipline standings | | | | Ski Tour standings | | | | |
| Season | Age | Overall | Distance | Sprint | U23 | Nordic Opening | Tour de Ski | Ski Tour 2020 | World Cup Final | Ski Tour Canada |
|---|---|---|---|---|---|---|---|---|---|---|
| 2023 | 15 | NC | NC | NC | —N/a | —N/a | — | —N/a | —N/a | —N/a |
| 2024 | 16 | NC | NC | NC | —N/a | —N/a | — | —N/a | —N/a | —N/a |
| 2025 | 17 | NC | NC | NC | NC | —N/a | — | —N/a | —N/a | —N/a |

== Personal life ==
In 2024, Shaktula started her studies at the Kharkiv State Academy of Physical Culture.
