= Daryna Myhal =

Ukrainian cross-country skier

Personal information
- Full name: Daryna Serhiivna Myhal
- Born: 22 March 2005 (age 21)
- Height: 158 cm (5 ft 2 in)

Sport
- Sport: Skiing
- Updated on 3 March 2026

Daryna Serhiivna Myhal (Ukrainian: Дарина Сергіївна Мигаль; born 22 March 2005) is a cross-country skier from Ukraine. She represented Ukraine at the 2026 Winter Olympics.

== Cross-country skiing results ==
All results are sourced from the International Ski Federation (FIS).

=== Olympic Games ===
Year	Age	15 km individual	30 km skiathlon	50 km mass start	Sprint	4 × 10 km relay	Team sprint
2026	20	65	63	—	81	16	—

== Personal life ==
Drahun was born in Krasnopillia settlement hromada.
