= Anastasiia Nikon =

Ukrainian cross-country skier

Personal information
- Full name: Anastasiia Hennadiivna Nikon
- Born: 14 February 2004 (age 22)
- Height: 165 cm (5 ft 5 in)

Sport
- Sport: Skiing

World Cup career
- Seasons: 4 (2023—)
- Updated on 5 March 2026

Anastasiia Hennadiivna Nikon (Ukrainian: Анастасія Геннадіївна Нікон; born 14 February 2004) is a cross-country skier from Ukraine. She represented Ukraine at the 2026 Winter Olympics.

== Cross-country skiing results ==
All results are sourced from the International Ski Federation (FIS).

=== Olympic Games ===
Year	Age	15 km individual	30 km skiathlon	50 km mass start	Sprint	4 × 10 km relay	Team sprint
2026	21	67	61	—	59	16	20

=== World Championships ===
Year	Age	15/10 km individual	30/20 km skiathlon	50 km mass start	Sprint	4 × 10/7.5 km relay	Team sprint
2023	18	60	49	—	64	—	18
2025	20	57	—	—	—	15	18

=== World Cup ===
==== Season standings ====
Season	Age	Discipline standings				Ski Tour standings				
Season	Age	Overall	Distance	Sprint	U23	Nordic Opening	Tour de Ski	Ski Tour 2020	World Cup Final	Ski Tour Canada
2023	19	NC	NC	NC	—N/a	—N/a	—	—N/a	—N/a	—N/a
2024	20	NC	NC	NC	—N/a	—N/a	—	—N/a	—N/a	—N/a
2025	21	NC	NC	NC	NC	—N/a	—	—N/a	—N/a	—N/a

== Personal life ==
Nikon studied at the Sumy Anton Makarenko State Pedagogical University.
