= Cross-country skiing at the 2026 Winter Olympics – Women's 10 kilometre freestyle =

Women's 10 kilometre freestyle at the XXV Olympic Winter Games
- Cross-country skiing
- Venue: Cross country and biathlon center Fabio Canal, Tesero
- Date: 12 February 2026
- Competitors: 111 from 46 nations
- Winning time: 22:49.2

Medalists
1st place, gold medalist(s)		Frida Karlsson	Sweden
2nd place, silver medalist(s)		Ebba Andersson	Sweden
3rd place, bronze medalist(s)		Jessie Diggins	United States

The women's 10 kilometre freestyle competition in cross-country skiing at the 2026 Winter Olympics was held on 12 February, at the Cross country and biathlon center Fabio Canal in Tesero. Frida Karlsson of Sweden won the event, her second gold medal at these Games. Her teammate Ebba Andersson won the silver medal, and Jessie Diggins of the United States won bronze. Diggins was skiing with a bruised rib, a consequence of a crash a few days earlier.

== Background ==
The 2022 champion, Therese Johaug, retired from competitions. The silver medalist, Kerttu Niskanen, and the bronze medalist, Krista Pärmäkoski, qualified for the event. Jessie Diggins was leading both overall and distance standings of the FIS Cross-Country World Cup before the Olympics. Ebba Andersson was the 2025 world champion in the event.

== Results ==
The race was started at 13:00.

Rank	Bib	Name	Country	Time	Deficit
1st place, gold medalist(s)	42	Frida Karlsson	Sweden	22:49.2	
2nd place, silver medalist(s)	40	Ebba Andersson	Sweden	23:35.8	+46.6
3rd place, bronze medalist(s)	44	Jessie Diggins	United States	23:38.9	+49.7
4	48	Astrid Øyre Slind	Norway	23:42.2	+53.0
5	32	Heidi Weng	Norway	23:46.1	+56.9
6	52	Karoline Simpson-Larsen	Norway	23:57.2	+1:08.0
7	50	Teresa Stadlober	Austria	24:00.0	+1:10.8
8	23	Alison Mackie	Canada	24:07.1	+1:17.9
9	54	Kristin Austgulen Fosnæs	Norway	24:11.0	+1:21.8
10	25	Léonie Perry	France	24:11.2	+1:22.0
11	46	Moa Ilar	Sweden	24:17.5	+1:28.3
12	36	Kateřina Janatová	Czech Republic	24:18.6	+1:29.4
13	30	Emma Ribom	Sweden	24:27.9	+1:38.7
14	56	Nadja Kälin	Switzerland	24:31.3	+1:42.1
15	18	Patrīcija Eiduka	Latvia	24:33.3	+1:44.1
16	24	Nadine Fähndrich	Switzerland	24:35.8	+1:46.6
17	13	Liliane Gagnon	Canada	24:37.6	+1:48.4
18	27	Vilma Ryytty	Finland	24:40.0	+1:50.8
19	58	Pia Fink	Germany	24:44.2	+1:55.0
20	9	Martina Di Centa	Italy	24:44.9	+1:55.7
21	29	Dariya Nepryaeva	Individual Neutral Athletes	24:45.0	+1:55.8
22	49	Delphine Claudel	France	24:53.8	+2:04.6
23	15	Marina Kälin	Switzerland	24:54.2	+2:05.0
24	37	Anna Pryce	Great Britain	24:55.1	+2:05.9
25	28	Krista Pärmäkoski	Finland	24:56.4	+2:07.2
26	7	Masae Tsuchiya	Japan	25:00.4	+2:11.2
27	16	Eliza Rucka-Michałek	Poland	25:06.8	+2:17.6
28	34	Helen Hoffmann	Germany	25:07.4	+2:18.2
29	60	Kerttu Niskanen	Finland	25:09.0	+2:19.8
30	26	Vilma Nissinen	Finland	25:10.6	+2:21.4
31	47	Novie McCabe	United States	25:12.8	+2:23.6
32	38	Caterina Ganz	Italy	25:13.1	+2:23.9
33	11	Rosie Fordham	Australia	25:17.8	+2:28.6
34	8	Sonjaa Schmidt	Canada	25:22.2	+2:33.0
35	21	Gina del Rio	Andorra	25:25.9	+2:36.7
36	14	Julie Pierrel	France	25:29.3	+2:40.1
37	2	Keidy Kaasiku	Estonia	25:33.7	+2:44.5
38	3	Kendall Kramer	United States	25:34.9	+2:45.7
39	39	Hailey Swirbul	United States	25:45.3	+2:56.1
40	6	Izabela Marcisz	Poland	25:47.5	+2:58.3
41	41	Katharina Brudermann	Austria	25:50.4	+3:01.2
42	20	Sofie Krehl	Germany	25:51.1	+3:01.9
43	10	Kaidy Kaasiku	Estonia	25:56.3	+3:07.1
44	61	Aleksandra Kołodziej	Poland	25:57.0	+3:07.8
45	53	Hanna Karaliova	Individual Neutral Athletes	25:59.3	+3:10.1
46	12	Anna Comarella	Italy	26:00.6	+3:11.4
47	17	Katherine Stewart-Jones	Canada	26:01.7	+3:12.5
48	19	Anja Mandeljc	Slovenia	26:05.0	+3:15.8
49	55	Phoebe Cridland	Australia	26:05.5	+3:16.3
50	45	Mariel Merlii Pulles	Estonia	26:05.8	+3:16.6
51	1	Mélissa Gal	France	26:08.0	+3:18.8
52	57	Lea Fischer	Switzerland	26:08.7	+3:19.5
53	43	Anna Milerská	Czech Republic	26:10.6	+3:21.4
54	51	Anna Marie Jaklová	Czech Republic	26:14.1	+3:24.9
55	5	Barbora Havlíčková	Czech Republic	26:18.4	+3:29.2
55	33	Lisa Achleitner	Austria	26:18.4	+3:29.2
57	63	Ellen Søhol Lie	Australia	26:21.7	+3:32.5
58	66	Magdalena Scherz	Austria	26:24.7	+3:35.5
59	22	Maria Gismondi	Italy	26:27.6	+3:38.4
60	4	Monika Skinder	Poland	26:32.3	+3:43.1
61	75	Kitija Auziņa	Latvia	26:36.6	+3:47.4
62	35	Teesi Tuul	Estonia	26:38.3	+3:49.1
63	62	Nadezhda Stepashkina	Kazakhstan	26:42.6	+3:53.4
64	31	Sophia Tsu Velicer	Chinese Taipei	26:49.2	+4:00.0
65	78	Daryna Myhal	Ukraine	26:51.2	+4:02.0
66	69	Chi Chunxue	China	26:52.0	+4:02.8
67	71	Anastasiia Nikon	Ukraine	26:54.3	+4:05.1
68	59	Theresa Fürstenberg	Germany	26:55.1	+4:05.9
69	77	Sofiia Shkatula	Ukraine	26:58.2	+4:09.0
70	79	Neža Žerjav	Slovenia	27:13.7	+4:24.5
71	70	Xeniya Shalygina	Kazakhstan	27:19.8	+4:30.6
72	80	He Kaile	China	27:27.7	+4:38.5
73	65	Lee Eui-jin	South Korea	27:35.9	+4:46.7
74	76	Wang Yundi	China	27:41.6	+4:52.4
75	68	Darya Ryazhko	Kazakhstan	27:42.6	+4:53.4
76	81	Yelizaveta Nopriienko	Ukraine	27:56.4	+5:07.2
77	72	Maddie Hooker	Australia	28:07.0	+5:17.8
78	73	Dilnigar Ilhamjan	China	28:10.5	+5:21.3
79	82	Ieva Dainytė	Lithuania	28:12.6	+5:23.4
80	67	Han Da-som	South Korea	28:15.8	+5:26.6
81	64	Anna Melnik	Kazakhstan	28:28.7	+5:39.5
82	104	Katya Galstyan	Armenia	28:33.7	+5:44.5
83	74	Enkhbayaryn Ariuntungalag	Mongolia	28:38.2	+5:49.0
84	110	Karen Chanloung	Thailand	28:39.7	+5:50.5
85	84	Sára Pónya	Hungary	28:44.1	+5:54.9
86	93	Konstantina Charalampidou	Greece	28:54.2	+6:05.0
87	83	Kalina Nedyalkova	Bulgaria	29:02.5	+6:13.3
88	107	Ema Sobol	Croatia	29:04.6	+6:15.4
89	90	Tia Janežič	Slovenia	29:12.3	+6:23.1
90	88	Nahiara Díaz	Argentina	29:24.1	+6:34.9
91	86	Eglė Savickaitė	Lithuania	29:26.9	+6:37.7
92	87	Agustina Groetzner	Argentina	29:32.6	+6:43.4
93	85	Lara Vanda Laczkó	Hungary	29:51.7	+7:02.5
94	96	Linda Kaparkalēja	Latvia	29:53.3	+7:04.1
95	89	Lucija Medja	Slovenia	30:14.6	+7:25.4
96	92	Delia Reit	Romania	30:18.3	+7:29.1
97	94	Tena Hadžić	Croatia	30:39.9	+7:50.7
98	111	Samaneh Beyrami Baher	Iran	30:49.9	+8:00.7
99	95	Bruna Moura	Brazil	30:56.9	+8:07.7
100	97	Nefeli Tita	Greece	31:10.8	+8:21.6
101	99	Samanta Krampe	Latvia	31:20.7	+8:31.5
102	100	Mária Danielová	Slovakia	31:20.8	+8:31.6
103	102	İrem Dursun	Turkey	31:26.8	+8:37.6
104	105	Elizaveta Hlusovici	Moldova	31:29.1	+8:39.9
105	101	Ana Cvetanovska	North Macedonia	31:32.4	+8:43.2
106	91	Anja Ilić	Serbia	32:22.9	+9:33.7
107	103	Jenny Axisa Eriksen	Malta	32:51.4	+10:02.2
108	108	Regina Martínez	Mexico	34:05.4	+11:16.2
	106	Teodora Delipara	Bosnia and Herzegovina	Did not finish	
	109	Eduarda Ribera	Brazil	Did not finish	
	98	Kristrún Guðnadóttir	Iceland	Disqualified	
