= FIS Nordic World Ski Championships 2025 – Women's 4 × 7.5 kilometre relay =

Women's 4 × 7.5 kilometre relay at the FIS Nordic World Ski Championships 2025
- Venue: Granåsen Ski Centre
- Location: Trondheim, Norway
- Dates: 7 March
- Competitors: 80 from 20 nations
- Teams: 20
- Winning time: 1:15:41.5

Medalists
gold medal	Emma Ribom; Frida Karlsson; Ebba Andersson; Jonna Sundling	Sweden
silver medal	Heidi Weng; Astrid Øyre Slind; Therese Johaug; Kristin Austgulen Fosnæs	Norway
bronze medal	Pia Fink; Katharina Hennig; Helen Hoffmann; Victoria Carl	Germany

The Women's 4 × 7.5 kilometre relay competition at the FIS Nordic World Ski Championships 2025 was held on 7 March 2025.

== Results ==
The race was started at 13:15.

Rank	Bib	Country	Time	Deficit
1st place, gold medalist(s)	3	Sweden; Emma Ribom; Frida Karlsson; Ebba Andersson; Jonna Sundling	1:15:41.5; 19:14.1; 18:19.3; 19:01.6; 19:06.5	
2nd place, silver medalist(s)	1	Norway; Heidi Weng; Astrid Øyre Slind; Therese Johaug; Kristin Austgulen Fosnæs	1:15:42.2; 18:38.2; 18:25.2; 18:54.1; 19:44.4	+0.7
3rd place, bronze medalist(s)	2	Germany; Pia Fink; Katharina Hennig; Helen Hoffmann; Victoria Carl	1:16:54.9; 18:40.9; 19:04.3; 19:36.2; 19:33.5	+1:13.4
4	4	Finland; Johanna Matintalo; Kerttu Niskanen; Krista Pärmäkoski; Jasmi Joensuu	1:16:55.4; 19:24.2; 18:48.4; 19:36.2; 19:33.5	+1:13.9
5	9	Switzerland; Anja Weber; Nadja Kälin; Marina Kälin; Nadine Fähndrich	1:19:00.8; 19:20.5; 19:28.5; 20:20.8; 19:51.0	+3:19.3
6	5	United States; Rosie Brennan; Julia Kern; Sophia Laukli; Jessie Diggins	1:19:02.6; 19:22.9; 19:48.2; 20:05.5; 19:46.0	+3:21.1
7	6	Italy; Anna Comarella; Caterina Ganz; Maria Gismondi; Martina Di Centa	1:19:28.4; 19:39.7; 19:30.1; 19:55.8; 20:22.8	+3:46.9
8	8	Czech Republic; Kateřina Janatová; Anna Marie Jaklová; Barbora Havlíčková; Anna Milerská	1:21:26.4; 18:42.5; 20:27.9; 20:39.3; 21:36.7	+5:44.9
9	7	Canada; Alison Mackie; Katherine Stewart-Jones; Liliane Gagnon; Sonjaa Schmidt	1:21:49.2; 20:03.2; 20:20.7; 20:39.4; 20:45.9	+6:07.7
10	19	Japan; Chika Honda; Masae Tsuchiya; Chika Kobayashi; Shiori Yokohama	1:22:54.6; 21:06.2; 20:27.6; 20:33.1; 20:47.7	+7:13.1
11	18	Estonia; Kaidy Kaasiku; Keidy Kaasiku; Mariel Merlii Pulles; Teesi Tuul	1:23:29.1; 20:06.6; 19:57.3; 21:01.0; 22:24.2	+7:47.6
12	14	Australia; Tuva Bygrave; Ellen Søhol Lie; Rosie Fordham; Phoebe Cridland	1:25:39.5; 21:22.0; 21:25.9; 20:35.1; 22:16.5	+9:58.0
13	10	Kazakhstan; Kseniya Shalygina; Angelina Shuryga; Nadezhda Stepashkina; Darya Ryazhko	1:27:20.5; 21:27.1; 21:48.7; 21:07.0; 22:57.7	+11:39.0
14	13	China; Meng Honglian; Chen Lingshuang; Jialin Bayani; Yilamujiang Dinigeer	LAP; 21:18.0; 20:55.1; 22:26.6	
15	15	Ukraine; Anastasiia Nikon; Sofiia Shkatula; Yelizaveta Nopriienko; Viktoriya Olekh	LAP; 21:25.8; 22:58.8	
16	11	Latvia; Kitija Auziņa; Adriāna Šuminska; Samanta Krampe; Linda Kaparkalēja	LAP; 21:55.4; 24:16.4	
17	12	Croatia; Tena Hadžić; Leona Garac; Ema Sobol; Nives Baričevac	LAP; 24:14.7	
18	20	Brazil; Eduarda Ribera; Jaqueline Mourão; Bruna Moura; Mirlene Picin	LAP; 24:16.0	
19	16	Lithuania; Ieva Dainytė; Kornelija Sukovaitė; Eglė Savickaitė; Greta Gabrielė Kilbauskaitė	LAP; 25:22.6	
	17	Mongolia; Enkhbayaryn Ariuntungalag; Ariunsanaagiin Enkhtuul; Tömöriin Ariunbold; Barsnyamyn Nomin-Erdene	Did not start	
