= Victoria Carl =

German cross-country skier (born 1995)

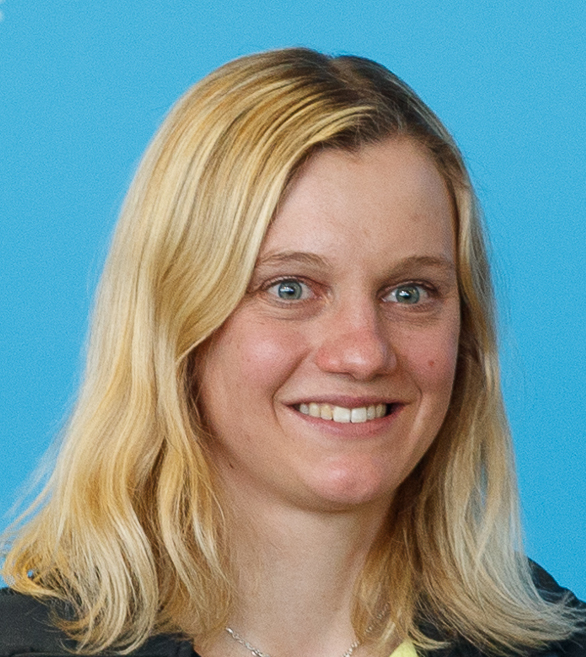
- Victoria Carl in February, 2022

Personal information
- Nationality: Germany
- Born: 31 July 1995 (age 30) Zella-Mehlis, Germany
- Height: 1.78 m (5 ft 10 in)

Sport
- Sport: Skiing
- Club: SCM Zella-Mehlis

World Cup career
- Seasons: 12 – (2013–present)
- Indiv. starts: 201
- Indiv. podiums: 7
- Indiv. wins: 1
- Team starts: 16
- Team podiums: 4
- Team wins: 0
- Overall titles: 0 – (4th in 2024)
- Discipline titles: 0
Medal record
Women's cross-country skiing
Representing Germany
Olympic Games
Gold medal – first place	2022 Beijing	Team sprint
Silver medal – second place	2022 Beijing	4 × 5 km relay
World Championships
Silver medal – second place	2023 Planica	4 × 5 km relay
Bronze medal – third place	2025 Trondheim	4 x 7.5 km relay
U23 World Championships
Gold medal – first place	2016 Râșnov	10 km freestyle
Silver medal – second place	2016 Râșnov	10 km classical
Junior World Championships
Gold medal – first place	2013 Liberec	5 km freestyle
Gold medal – first place	2015 Almaty	5 km freestyle
Gold medal – first place	2015 Almaty	Individual sprint
Silver medal – second place	2013 Liberec	Individual sprint
Silver medal – second place	2015 Almaty	10 km skiathlon
Bronze medal – third place	2013 Liberec	4 × 3.33 km relay
Bronze medal – third place	2015 Almaty	4 × 3.33 km relay
Winter Youth Olympics
Gold medal – first place	2012 Innsbruck	Biathlon; Cross-country relay
- Updated on 1 March 2025

Victoria Carl (born 31 July 1995) is a German cross-country skier. She has competed in the World Cup since the 2013 season.

She represented Germany at the FIS Nordic World Ski Championships 2015 in Falun.

Carl participated in the 2018 Olympics, but has not won any medals. At the 2022 Olympics in Beijing, she won a silver medal in the relay and became the Olympic champion in the team sprint (with Katharina Hennig).

In 2025, Carl tested positive for clenbuterol and was provisionally suspended. As a result, she missed the 2026 Olympics and could not defend her title.

== Cross-country skiing results ==
All results are sourced from the International Ski Federation (FIS).

=== Olympic Games ===
- 2 medals (1 gold, 1 silver)

Year	Age	10 km individual	15 km skiathlon	30 km mass start	Sprint	4 × 5 km relay	Team sprint
2018	22	19	20	25	—	6	—
2022	26	—	—	12	10	Silver	Gold

=== World Championships ===
- 2 medals – (1 silver, 1 bronze)

Year	Age	10 km individual	15 km skiathlon	30 km mass start	Sprint	4 × 5 km relay	Team sprint
2015	19	—	29	29	38	6	—
2017	21	21	15	37	23	—	—
2019	23	—	—	9	5	4	6
2021	25	14	—	—	—	5	9
2023	27	14	—	—	23	Silver	4
2025	29	14	9	—	15	Bronze	—

=== World Cup ===
==== Season standings ====
Season	Age	Discipline standings				Ski Tour standings				
Season	Age	Overall	Distance	Sprint	U23	Nordic Opening	Tour de Ski	Ski Tour 2020	World Cup Final	Ski Tour Canada
2013	17	NC	NC	—	—N/a	—	DNF	—N/a	—	—N/a
2014	18	114	NC	78	—N/a	—	DNF	—N/a	—	—N/a
2015	19	75	54	66	10	DNF	DNF	—N/a	—N/a	—N/a
2016	20	69	64	50	14	—	—	—N/a	—N/a	DNF
2017	21	56	35	NC	9	45	DNF	—N/a	27	—N/a
2018	22	37	38	37	8	20	DNF	—N/a	16	—N/a
2019	23	54	33	47	—N/a	29	DNF	—N/a	—	—N/a
2020	24	33	22	80	—N/a	15	DNF	—	—N/a	—N/a
2021	25	44	34	36	—N/a	DNF	—	—N/a	—N/a	—N/a
2022	26	26	15	37	—N/a	—N/a	DNF	—N/a	—N/a	—N/a
2023	27	19	14	31	—N/a	—N/a	DNF	—N/a	—N/a	—N/a
2024	28	4	2nd place, silver medalist(s)	16	—N/a	—N/a	9	—N/a	—N/a	—N/a
2025	29	2	3	14	—N/a	—N/a	8	—N/a	—N/a	—N/a

==== Individual podiums ====
- 1 victories – (1 WC)
- 9 podiums – (7 WC, 2 SWC)

No.	Season	Date	Location	Race	Level	Place
1	2023–24	10 December 2023	Östersund, Sweden	10 km Individual F	World Cup	3rd
2	2023–24	17 December 2023	Trondheim, Norway	10 km Individual C	World Cup	1st
3	2023–24	31 December 2023	Toblach, Italy	10 km Individual C	Stage World Cup	2nd
4	2023–24	1 January 2024	Toblach, Italy	20 km Pursuit F	Stage World Cup	2nd
5	2023–24	2 March 2024	Lahti, Finland	20 km Individual C	World Cup	2nd
6	2024–25	17 January 2025	Les Rousses, France	10 km Individual F	World Cup	2nd
7	2024–25	15 February 2025	Falun, Sweden	10 km Individual C	World Cup	3rd
8	2024–25	15 March 2025	Oslo, Norway	20 km Individual C	World Cup	3rd
9	2024–25	16 March 2025	Oslo, Norway	10 km Individual F	World Cup	3rd

==== Team podiums ====
- 4 podiums – (4 RL)

No.	Season	Date	Location	Race	Level	Place	Teammates
1	2016–17	22 January 2017	Ulricehamn, Sweden	4 × 5 km Relay C/F	World Cup	2nd	Hennig / Böhler / Ringwald
2	2022–23	19 March 2023	Falun, Sweden	4 × 5 km Mixed Relay C/F	World Cup	3rd	Kuchler / Hennig / Sossau
3	2023–24	3 December 2023	Gällivare, Sweden	4 × 7.5 km Relay C/F	World Cup	2nd	Gimmler / Hennig / Fink
4	2023–24	21 January 2024	Oberhof, Germany	4 × 7.5 km Relay C/F	World Cup	2nd	Sauerbrey / Hennig / Fink

== See also ==
- List of Youth Olympic Games gold medalists who won Olympic gold medals
