= Cross-country skiing at the 2026 Winter Olympics – Women's team sprint =

Women's team sprint at the XXV Olympic Winter Games
- Cross-country skiing
- Venue: Cross country and biathlon center Fabio Canal, Tesero
- Date: 18 February 2026

Medalists
1st place, gold medalist(s)		Jonna Sundling; Maja Dahlqvist	Sweden
2nd place, silver medalist(s)		Nadja Kälin; Nadine Fähndrich	Switzerland
3rd place, bronze medalist(s)		Laura Gimmler; Coletta Rydzek	Germany

The women's team sprint competition in cross-country skiing at the 2026 Winter Olympics will be held on 18 February, over a 1.585-kilometre (0.985 mi) course at the Cross country and biathlon center Fabio Canal in Tesero. Jonna Sundling and Maja Dahlqvist of Sweden won the event. Nadja Kälin and Nadine Fähndrich of Switzerland won the silver medal, and Laura Gimmler and Coletta Rydzek of Germany won bronze. For Dahlqvist this was the first Olympic gold medal, for Kälin, Fähndrich, Gimmler, and Rydzek first Olympic medals.

== Background ==
The 2022 champions were Katharina Hennig and Victoria Carl. Henning, currently competing as Hennig Dotzler, qualified for the Olympics, but was not selected for the team sprint. Carl was provisionally suspended after failing a doping test in 2025. She has competed in the World Cup since the 2013 season. The silver medalists, Maja Dahlqvist and Jonna Sundling, qualified for the event. The bronze medalists, Yuliya Stupak and Natalya Nepryayeva, were barred from participation in all international team events after the start of the Russian invasion of Ukraine. There were only two team sprint events in the 2025–26 FIS Cross-Country World Cup before the Olympics. Dahlquist and Sundling won one, and Laura Gimmler and Coletta Rydzek another one. Sundling and Dahlquist were also the 2025 world champions in team sprint.

== Results ==
=== Qualification ===
Rank	Bib	Country	Athletes	Time	Notes
1	2	Sweden	Jonna Sundling; Maja Dahlqvist	6:29.94	Q
2	5	Finland	Jasmi Joensuu; Jasmin Kähärä	6:44.86	Q
3	9	Canada	Alison Mackie; Liliane Gagnon	6:46.66	Q
4	4	Switzerland	Nadja Kälin; Nadine Fähndrich	6:47.54	Q
5	1	Norway	Astrid Øyre Slind; Julie Bjervig Drivenes	6:47.89	Q
6	6	Germany	Laura Gimmler; Coletta Rydzek	6:49.02	Q
7	3	United States	Jessie Diggins; Julia Kern	6:49.43	Q
8	14	Austria	Heidi Bucher; Magdalena Scherz	6:50.97	Q
9	7	Italy	Caterina Ganz; Iris De Martin Pinter	6:51.19	Q
10	8	France	Léonie Perry; Mélissa Gal	6:52.54	Q
11	11	Poland	Izabela Marcisz; Monika Skinder	6:58.52	Q
12	15	Latvia	Kitija Auziņa; Patrīcija Eiduka	6:59.90	Q
13	12	Estonia	Mariel Merlii Pulles; Keidy Kaasiku	7:01.38	Q
14	10	Czech Republic	Sandra Schützová; Kateřina Janatová	7:01.82	Q
15	19	China	Dilnigar Ilhamjan; Chi Chunxue	7:13.01	Q
16	18	Slovenia	Lucija Medja; Anja Mandeljc	7:14.31	
17	16	Kazakhstan	Darya Ryazhko; Nadezhda Stepashkina	7:14.61	
18	13	Australia	Phoebe Cridland; Rosie Fordham	7:18.56	
19	25	Croatia	Tena Hadžić; Ema Sobol	7:25.15	
20	20	Ukraine	Anastasiia Nikon; Sofiia Shkatula	7:32.35	
21	26	Brazil	Eduarda Ribera; Bruna Moura	7:37.26	
22	22	Lithuania	Eglė Savickaitė; Ieva Dainytė	7:38.53	
23	17	South Korea	Han Da-som; Lee Eui-jin	7:50.72	
24	23	Argentina	Nahiara Díaz; Agustina Groetzner	7:51.15	
25	21	Hungary	Sára Pónya; Lara Vanda Laczkó	7:52.85	
26	24	Greece	Konstantina Charalampidou; Nefeli Tita	8:06.30	

=== Final ===
Rank	Bib	Country	Athletes	Time	Deficit
1st place, gold medalist(s)	2	Sweden	Jonna Sundling; Maja Dahlqvist	20:29.99	—
2nd place, silver medalist(s)	4	Switzerland	Nadja Kälin; Nadine Fähndrich	20:31.39	+1.40
3rd place, bronze medalist(s)	6	Germany	Laura Gimmler; Coletta Rydzek	20:35.86	+5.87
4	1	Norway	Astrid Øyre Slind; Julie Bjervig Drivenes	20:36.00	+6.01
5	3	United States	Jessie Diggins; Julia Kern	20:41.53	+11.54
6	9	Canada	Alison Mackie; Liliane Gagnon	20:49.43	+15.44
7	8	France	Léonie Perry; Mélissa Gal	20:53.61	+19.62
8	7	Italy	Caterina Ganz; Iris De Martin Pinter	21:10.87	+40.88
9	5	Finland	Jasmi Joensuu; Jasmin Kähärä	21:13.37	+43.38
10	14	Austria	Heidi Bucher; Magdalena Scherz	21:30.95	+1:00.96
11	11	Poland	Izabela Marcisz; Monika Skinder	21:31.80	+1:01.81
12	12	Estonia	Mariel Merlii Pulles; Keidy Kaasiku	21:34.95	+1:04.96
13	15	Latvia	Kitija Auziņa; Patrīcija Eiduka	21:56.05	+1:26.06
14	10	Czech Republic	Sandra Schützová; Kateřina Janatová	22:11.43	+1:41.44
15	19	China	Dilnigar Ilhamjan; Chi Chunxue	23:17.61	+2:47.62
