= Léonie Perry =

French cross-country skier (born 2004)

Personal information
- Nationality: France
- Born: 4 November 2004 (age 21) Remiremont, France

Sport
- Sport: Skiing
Medal record
Women's cross-country skiing
Representing France
U23 World Championships
Gold medal – first place	2026 Lillehammer	4 × 5 km relay
Bronze medal – third place	2026 Lillehammer	10 km classical
Bronze medal – third place	2026 Lillehammer	20 km freestyle

Léonie Perry (born 4 November 2004) is a French cross-country skier. She placed tenth in the 10 kilometre freestyle at the 2026 Winter Olympics on 12 February. She placed seventh in the team sprint at the World Cup on 23 January 2026.
