= Pia Fink =

German cross-country skier (born 1995)

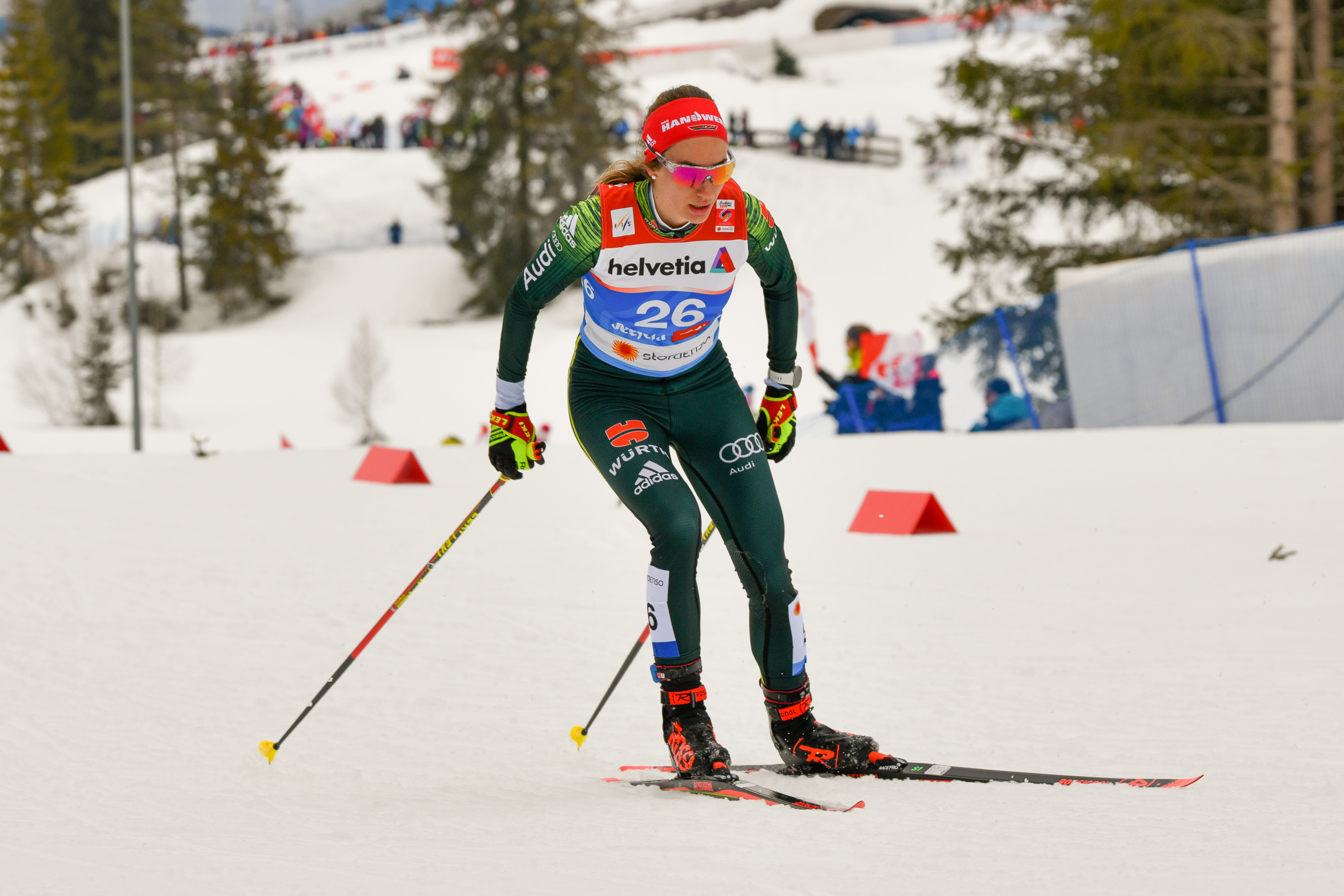
- Fink in 2019

Personal information
- Nationality: Germany
- Born: 10 July 1995 (age 31) Münsingen, Germany
- Height: 1.67 m (5 ft 6 in)

Sport
- Sport: Skiing
- Club: SV Bremelau

World Cup career
- Seasons: 7 – (2018–present)
- Indiv. starts: 111
- Indiv. podiums: 0
- Team starts: 10
- Team podiums: 2
- Overall titles: 0 – (30th in 2023)
- Discipline titles: 0
Medal record
Women's cross-country skiing
Representing Germany
World Championships
Silver medal – second place	2023 Planica	4 × 5 km relay
Bronze medal – third place	2025 Trondheim	4 x 7.5 km relay
- Updated on 21 January 2024

Pia Fink (born 10 July 1995) is a German cross-country skier. She participated at the FIS Nordic World Ski Championships 2019.

== Cross-country skiing results ==
All results are sourced from the International Ski Federation (FIS).

=== Olympic Games ===
Year	Age	10 km individual	15 km skiathlon	30 km mass start	Sprint	4 × 5 km relay	Team sprint
2022	26	—	25	25	15	—	—

=== World Championships ===
- 1 medal – (1 bronze)

Year	Age	10 km individual	15 km skiathlon	30 km mass start	Sprint	4 × 5 km relay	Team sprint
2019	23	15	30	25	—	—	—
2021	25	20	19	24	—	5	—
2023	27	7	14	13	—	Silver	—
2025	29	11	20	13	—	Bronze	—

=== World Cup ===
==== Season standings ====
Season	Age	Discipline standings				Ski Tour standings			
Season	Age	Overall	Distance	Sprint	U23	Nordic Opening	Tour de Ski	Ski Tour 2020	World Cup Final
2018	22	69	60	NC	11	—	26	—N/a	33
2019	23	37	32	NC	—N/a	DNF	17	—N/a	23
2020	24	71	49	NC	—N/a	30	DNF	—	—N/a
2021	25	35	26	72	—N/a	31	27	—N/a	—N/a
2022	26	51	32	56	—N/a	—N/a	30	—N/a	—N/a
2023	27	30	31	37	—N/a	—N/a	15	—N/a	—N/a
2024	28	38	27	49	—N/a	—N/a	DNF	—N/a	—N/a
2025	29	12	14	34	—N/a	—N/a	13	—N/a	—N/a

==== Team podiums ====
- 2 podiums – (2 RL)

No.	Season	Date	Location	Race	Level	Place	Teammates
1	2023–24	3 December 2023	Gällivare, Sweden	4 × 7.5 km Relay C/F	World Cup	2nd	Gimmler / Hennig / Carl
2	2023–24	21 January 2024	Oberhof, Germany	4 × 7.5 km Relay C/F	World Cup	2nd	Sauerbrey / Hennig / Carl
