= Anja Weber =

Swiss cross-country skier (born 2001)

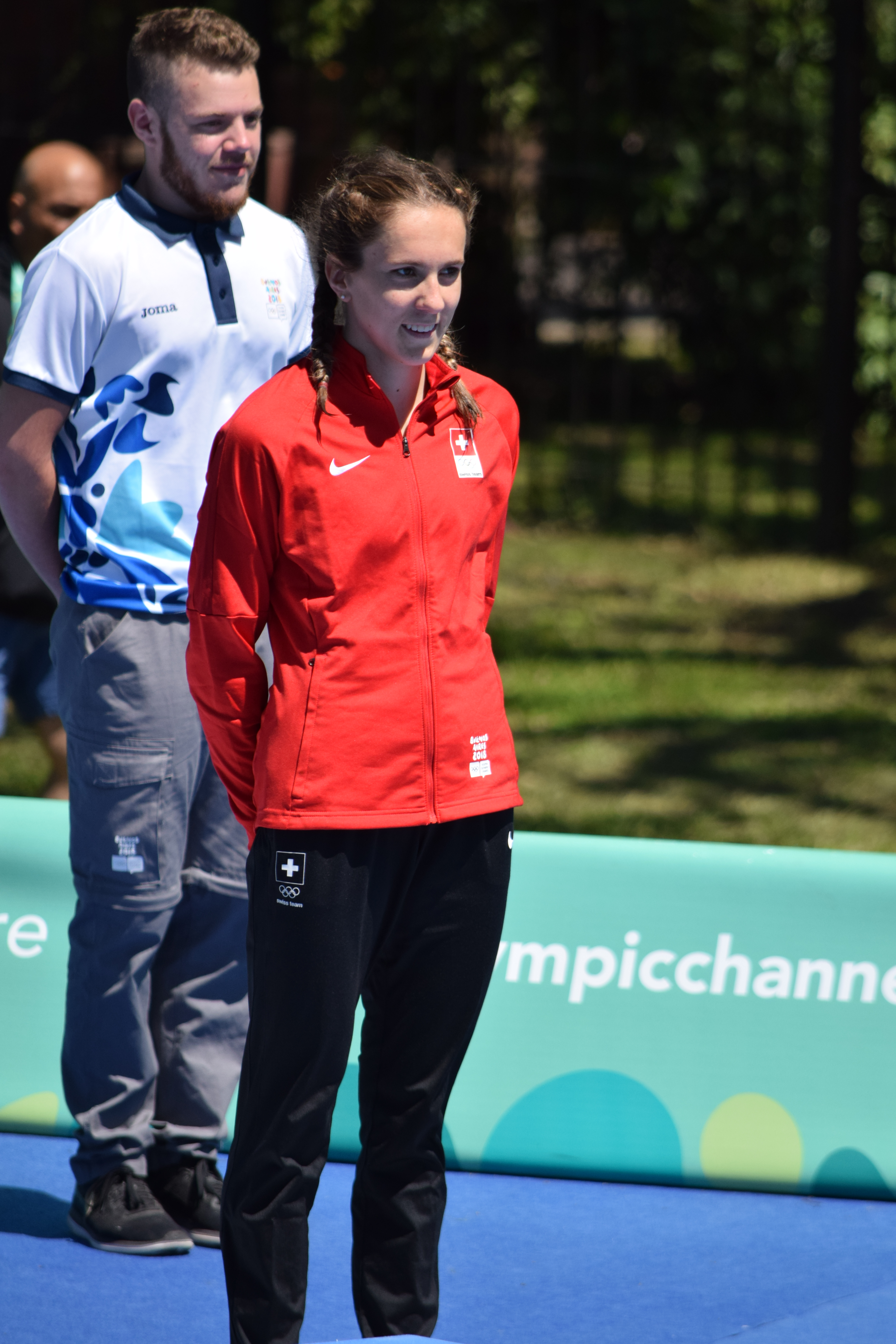
- Weber at the 2018 Summer Youth Olympics

Personal information
- Nationality: Switzerland
- Born: 29 June 2001 (age 25) Wetzikon, Switzerland
- Height: 1.69 m (5 ft 7 in)

Sport
- Sport: Skiing
- Club: TG Hütten
Medal record
Representing Switzerland
Women's cross-country skiing
World Championships
Bronze medal – third place	2025 Trondheim	Team sprint
U23 World Championships
Gold medal – first place	2022 Lygna	10 kilometre classical
Bronze medal – third place	2023 Whistler	Mixed relay
Junior World Championships
Gold medal – first place	2020 Lygna	4 × 3.3 kilometre relay
Women's triathlon
Youth Olympic Games
Gold medal – first place	2018 Buenos Aires	Mixed relay
Bronze medal – third place	2018 Buenos Aires	Individual

Anja Weber (born 29 June 2001) is a Swiss cross-country skier and triathlete.

She won a bronze medal in the Team sprint at the FIS Nordic World Ski Championships 2025 and competed at the 2022 and 2026 Winter Olympics.
