= FIS Nordic World Ski Championships 2025 – Women's 10 kilometre classical =

Women's 10 kilometre classical at the FIS Nordic World Ski Championships 2025
- Venue: Granåsen Ski Centre
- Location: Trondheim, Norway
- Dates: 4 March
- Competitors: 64 from 27 nations
- Winning time: 30:19.8

Medalists
gold medal	Ebba Andersson	Sweden
silver medal	Therese Johaug	Norway
bronze medal	Frida Karlsson	Sweden

The Women's 10 kilometre classical competition at the FIS Nordic World Ski Championships 2025 was held on 4 March 2025.

== Results ==
=== Final ===
The race was started at 15:30.

Rank	Bib	Athlete	Country	Time	Deficit	Notes
1st place, gold medalist(s)	34	Ebba Andersson	Sweden	30:19.8		
2nd place, silver medalist(s)	36	Therese Johaug	Norway	30:21.1	+1.3	
3rd place, bronze medalist(s)	42	Frida Karlsson	Sweden	30:31.9	+12.1	
4	58	Teresa Stadlober	Austria	30:34.8	+15.0	
5	56	Heidi Weng	Norway	30:46.1	+26.3	
6	40	Astrid Øyre Slind	Norway	30:49.0	+29.2	
7	44	Katharina Hennig	Germany	30:49.7	+29.9	
8	25	Nadja Kälin	Switzerland	30:50.8	+31.0	
9	52	Kerttu Niskanen	Finland	31:20.7	+1:00.9	
10	30	Johanna Matintalo	Finland	31:25.6	+1:05.8	
11	48	Pia Fink	Germany	31:26.6	+1:06.8	
12	32	Moa Ilar	Sweden	31:38.8	+1:19.0	
13	38	Silje Theodorsen	Norway	31:49.8	+1:30.0	
14	50	Victoria Carl	Germany	31:53.4	+1:33.6	
15	27	Caterina Ganz	Italy	32:03.2	+1:43.4	
16	54	Katherine Sauerbrey	Germany	32:06.5	+1:46.7	
17	46	Krista Pärmäkoski	Finland	32:14.7	+1:54.9	
18	28	Emma Ribom	Sweden	32:17.8	+1:58.0	
19	21	Kaidy Kaasiku	Estonia	32:19.9	+2:00.1	
20	20	Anna Comarella	Italy	32:22.6	+2:02.8	
21	23	Anja Mandeljc	Slovenia	32:44.4	+2:24.6	
22	29	Rosie Brennan	United States	32:49.0	+2:29.2	
23	26	Marina Kälin	Switzerland	32:51.7	+2:31.9	
23	45	Anna Marie Jaklová	Czech Republic	32:51.7	+2:31.9	
25	17	Gina del Rio	Andorra	33:06.4	+2:46.6	
26	24	Martina Di Centa	Italy	33:06.5	+2:46.7	
27	60	Katherine Stewart-Jones	Canada	33:08.7	+2:48.9	
28	13	Barbora Havlíčková	Czech Republic	33:09.2	+2:49.4	
29	22	Masae Tsuchiya	Japan	33:16.0	+2:56.2	
30	19	Jasmin Kähärä	Finland	33:16.6	+2:56.8	
31	18	Mélissa Gal	France	33:24.0	+3:04.2	
32	16	Chika Kobayashi	Japan	33:33.2	+3:13.4	
33	12	Alayna Sonnesyn	United States	33:46.5	+3:26.7	
34	15	Nadine Laurent	Italy	33:54.4	+3:34.6	
35	4	Sonjaa Schmidt	Canada	33:58.6	+3:38.8	
36	11	Chika Honda	Japan	34:00.6	+3:40.8	
37	9	Rosie Fordham	Australia	34:15.6	+3:55.8	
38	43	Sophia Tsu Velicer	Chinese Taipei	34:19.7	+3:59.9	
39	10	Izabela Marcisz	Poland	34:29.6	+4:09.8	
40	8	Olivia Bouffard-Nesbitt	Canada	34:32.9	+4:13.1	
41	55	Ellen Søhol Lie	Australia	34:35.3	+4:15.5	
42	61	Phoebe Cridland	Australia	34:35.5	+4:15.7	
43	53	Aleksandra Kolodziej	Poland	34:36.8	+4:17.0	
44	51	Tuva Bygrave	Australia	34:49.5	+4:29.7	
45	6	Teesi Tuul	Estonia	35:00.0	+4:40.2	
46	64	Chen Lingshuang	China	35:03.7	+4:43.9	
47	5	Angelina Shuryga	Kazakhstan	35:15.8	+4:56.0	
47	7	Nadezhda Stepashkina	Kazakhstan	35:15.8	+4:56.0	
49	39	Katya Galstyan	Armenia	35:38.4	+5:18.6	
50	63	Jialin Bayani	China	35:41.1	+5:21.3	
51	1	Anna Milerská	Czech Republic	35:46.0	+5:26.2	
52	14	Shiori Yokohama	Japan	35:47.2	+5:27.4	
53	3	Kseniya Shalygina	Kazakhstan	35:48.8	+5:29.0	
54	2	Lee Eui-jin	South Korea	35:50.2	+5:30.4	
55	62	Yilamujiang Dinigeer	China	35:52.2	+5:32.4	
56	35	Enkhbayaryn Ariuntungalag	Mongolia	35:54.9	+5:35.1	
57	57	Anastasiia Nikon	Ukraine	35:55.4	+5:35.6	
58	37	Nina Riedener	Liechtenstein	35:57.5	+5:37.7	
59	65	Meng Honglian	China	36:25.4	+6:05.6	
60	41	Kitija Auziņa	Latvia	36:26.0	+6:06.2	
61	49	Sofiia Shkatula	Ukraine	36:47.5	+6:27.7	
62	31	Lara Vanda Laczkó	Hungary	37:16.5	+6:56.7	
63	59	Han Da-som	South Korea	37:25.2	+7:05.4	
64	33	Sára Pónya	Hungary	38:04.3	+7:44.5	
	47	Viktoriia Olekh	Ukraine	Did not start		

=== Qualification ===
The qualification was started on 26 February at 13:30.

Rank	Bib	Athlete	Country	Time	Deficit	Notes
1	29	Chen Lingshuang	China	22:44.2		Q
2	22	Meng Honglian	China	23:39.1	+54.9	Q
3	32	Yilamujiang Dinigeer	China	23:40.9	+56.7	Q
4	40	Phoebe Cridland	Australia	24:18.5	+1:34.3	Q
5	60	Katya Galstyan	Armenia	24:36.5	+1:52.3	Q
6	30	Jialin Bayani	China	24:44.9	+2:00.7	Q
7	59	Nina Riedener	Liechtenstein	25:03.0	+2:18.8	Q
8	56	Enkhbayaryn Ariuntungalag	Mongolia	25:20.5	+2:36.3	Q
9	51	Sára Pónya	Hungary	25:52.8	+3:08.6	Q
10	47	Lara Vanda Vaczkó	Hungary	25:54.2	+3:10.0	Q
11	41	Samaneh Beyrami Baher	Iran	26:28.4	+3:44.2	
12	49	Agustina Groetzner	Argentina	26:41.5	+3:57.3	
13	58	Kalina Nedyalkova	Bulgaria	26:45.2	+4:01.0	
14	50	Rabia Akyol	Turkey	26:51.4	+4:07.2	
15	55	Delia Reit	Romania	27:12.8	+4:28.6	
16	43	Tömöriin Ariunbold	Mongolia	27:17.9	+4:33.7	
17	45	Jaqueline Mourão	Brazil	27:18.6	+4:34.4	
18	53	Nahiara Díaz	Argentina	27:28.3	+4:44.1	
19	57	Tena Hadžić	Croatia	27:34.2	+4:50.0	
20	34	Ieva Dainytė	Lithuania	27:37.3	+4:53.1	
21	44	Adriāna Šuminska	Latvia	27:39.3	+4:55.1	
22	36	Barsnyamyn Nomin-Erdene	Mongolia	27:41.2	+4:57.0	
23	10	Regina Martínez	Mexico	27:48.7	+5:04.5	
24	25	Ariunsanaagiin Enkhtuul	Mongolia	27:53.7	+5:09.5	
25	37	Eduarda Ribera	Brazil	27:54.4	+5:10.2	
26	28	Naranbatyn Nandintsetseg	Mongolia	28:01.9	+5:17.7	
27	31	Jenny Axisa Eriksen	Malta	28:03.4	+5:19.2	
28	21	Kornelija Sukovaitė	Lithuania	28:05.5	+5:21.3	
29	48	Nefeli Tita	Greece	28:26.8	+5:42.6	
30	20	Eglė Savickaitė	Lithuania	28:31.9	+5:47.7	
31	54	Konstantina Charalampidou	Greece	28:37.8	+5:53.6	
32	26	Valērija Burceva	Latvia	28:45.8	+6:01.6	
33	52	Anja Ilić	Serbia	28:51.0	+6:06.8	
34	23	Amanda Reilija Zaniņa	Latvia	29:18.7	+6:34.5	
35	38	Mirlene Picin	Brazil	29:19.7	+6:35.5	
36	33	Leona Garac	Croatia	29:32.1	+6:47.9	
37	12	Fabiola Corona	Mexico	29:42.7	+6:58.5	
38	24	Keita Marcinkeviča	Latvia	30:31.0	+7:46.8	
39	14	Greta Gabrielė Kilbauskaitė	Lithuania	31:02.1	+8:17.9	
40	27	Nives Baričevac	Croatia	31:08.3	+8:24.1	
41	35	Sara Plakalović	Bosnia and Herzegovina	31:14.4	+8:30.2	
42	13	Sahel Tir	Iran	31:28.9	+8:44.7	
43	16	Ashley Tshanda Ongonga	Kenya	31:44.6	+9:00.4	
44	39	Christina Roza	Greece	32:24.2	+9:40.0	
45	15	Karla Schleske	Mexico	33:13.0	+10:28.8	
46	18	Martina Flores	Chile	33:35.6	+10:51.4	
47	46	Ana Cvetanovska	North Macedonia	33:41.9	+10:57.7	
48	19	Maria Dimitra Tsiarka	Greece	34:46.8	+12:02.6	
49	11	Farnoosh Shemshaki	Iran	34:49.4	+12:05.2	
50	8	Atefeh Salehi	Iran	35:51.7	+13:07.5	
51	7	Bhavani Thekkada Nanjunda	India	35:54.6	+13:10.4	
52	9	Syrelle Lozom	Lebanon	36:40.3	+13:56.1	
53	1	Céline Marti	Haiti	36:42.3	+13:58.1	
54	17	Vanja Tucović	Serbia	37:59.3	+15:15.1	
55	2	Jeanne Darc Tawk	Lebanon	38:38.1	+15:53.9	
56	3	Estefania Belen Fuentes	Chile	39:12.6	+16:28.4	
57	5	Khadijah Ismail	Malaysia	39:25.9	+16:41.7	
58	6	Caren Succar	Lebanon	41:21.6	+18:37.4	
59	4	Mariana Cabrita	Portugal	43:11.0	+20:26.8	
	42	Bruna Moura	Brazil	Did not finish		
