= Jessie Diggins =

American cross-country skier (born 1991)

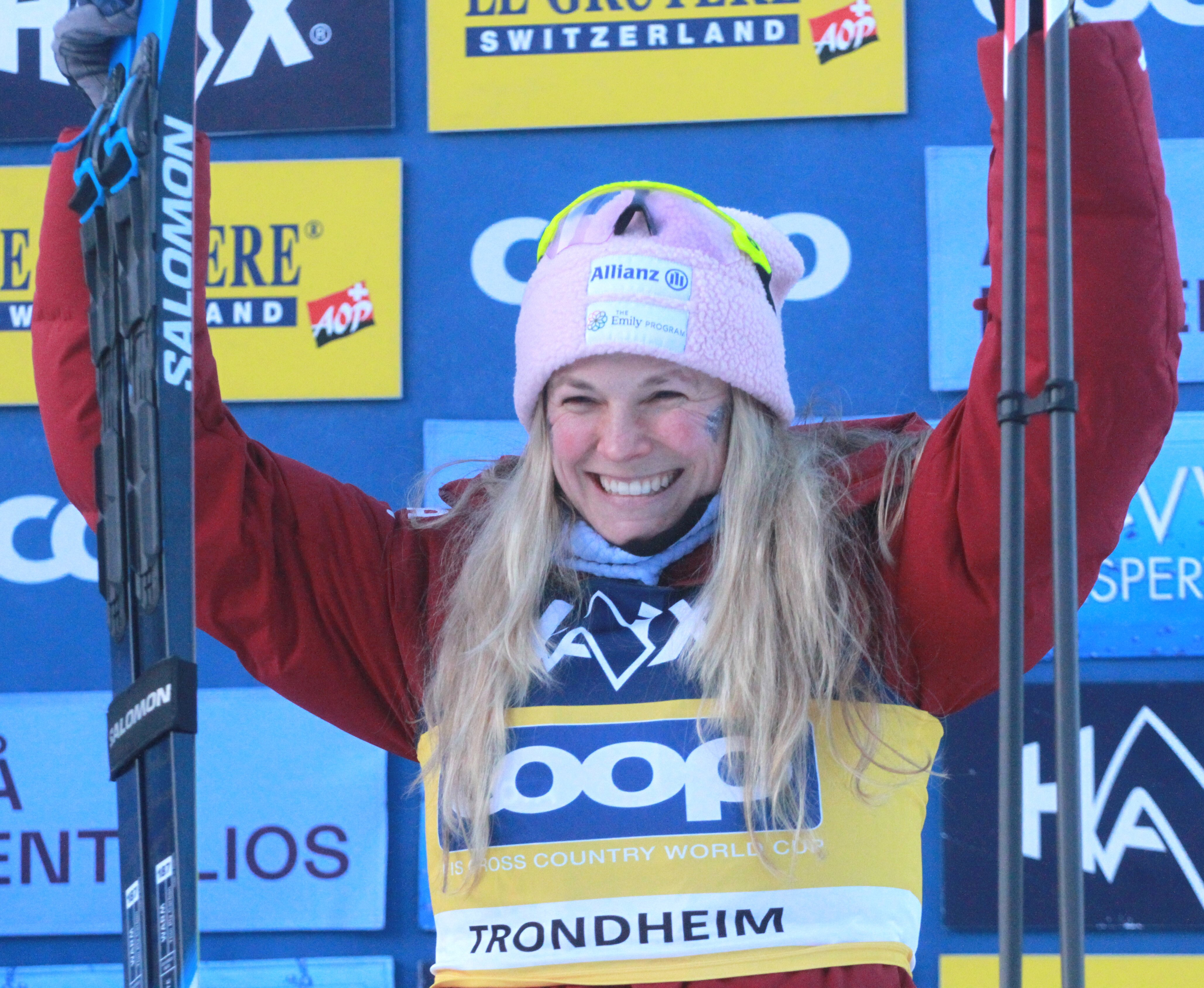
- Diggins in Trondheim, 2025

Personal information
- Nationality: United States
- Born: August 26, 1991 (age 35) Saint Paul, Minnesota, U.S.
- Height: 5 ft 4 in (163 cm)

Sport
- Sport: Skiing
- Club: Stratton Mountain School

World Cup career
- Seasons: 15 – (2011–2026)
- Indiv. starts: 365
- Indiv. podiums: 79
- Indiv. wins: 31
- Team starts: 20
- Team podiums: 11
- Team wins: 2
- Overall titles: 4 – (2021, 2024, 2025 & 2026)
- Discipline titles: 4 – (DI in 2021, 2024, 2025 & 2026)
Medal record
Women's cross-country skiing
Representing the United States
International nordic ski competitions
Event	1st	2nd	3rd
Winter Olympics	1	1	2
World Championships	2	3	2
Total	3	4	4
Olympic Games
Gold medal – first place	2018 Pyeongchang	Team sprint
Silver medal – second place	2022 Beijing	30 km freestyle
Bronze medal – third place	2022 Beijing	Individual sprint
Bronze medal – third place	2026 Milano Cortina	10 km freestyle
World Championships
Gold medal – first place	2013 Val di Fiemme	Team sprint
Gold medal – first place	2023 Planica	10 km freestyle
Silver medal – second place	2015 Falun	10 km freestyle
Silver medal – second place	2017 Lahti	Individual sprint
Silver medal – second place	2025 Trondheim	Team sprint
Bronze medal – third place	2017 Lahti	Team sprint
Bronze medal – third place	2023 Planica	Team sprint
U23 World Championships
Silver medal – second place	2014 Val di Fiemme	Individual sprint
- Updated on March 22, 2026

Jessica Diggins (born August 26, 1991) is an American cross-country skier and endurance athlete. She is the most accomplished cross-country skier from the United States in the sport's history having won four World Cup overall titles, four Olympic medals, seven World Championship medals, and numerous other event championships. The New Yorker described Diggins as "the greatest American ever to put on a pair of skinny skis, and arguably the greatest winter endurance athlete this country has ever produced". She retired from top-level cross-country skiing after the 2025–26 season and transitioned to ultramarathon running.

Diggins and teammate Kikkan Randall won the United States' first-ever cross-country skiing gold medals with a team sprint victory at the 2018 Winter Olympics in Pyeongchang. At the 2022 Winter Olympics, Diggins won the silver medal in the 30 kilometer freestyle and the bronze medal in the individual sprint, making her the most decorated American cross-country skier of all time. At the 2026 Winter Olympics, she won a bronze medal in the 10 kilometer freestyle.

Diggins has also won seven medals, including two golds, at the FIS Nordic World Ski Championships, from 2013 to 2025. She was the first American to win an individual event gold medal by winning the 10 kilometer freestyle in 2023. Diggins has competed in the FIS Cross-Country World Cup since 2011. In 2021, she won the women's overall title for the 2020–21 FIS Cross-Country World Cup, becoming the first American woman to win a season title and the first American to win one since Bill Koch in 1982. Diggins again won FIS Cross-Country World Cup overall titles in the 2023–24, 2024–25, and 2025–26 seasons.

Diggins has used her status as a famous athlete to advance advocacy related to climate change and eating disorders.

== Early life ==
Jessica "Jessie" Diggins was born in Saint Paul, Minnesota, to parents Clay Diggins and Deb Diggins (née Robinet). Her parents are both originally from Canada. Diggins grew up in Afton, Minnesota. She has one sister, Mackenzie. Diggins attended Stillwater Area High School, graduating in 2010.

Diggins began skiing at age four and participated in the Minnesota Youth Ski League. She showed prowess for skiing at age 11 when she started competing against older children.

== Athletic career ==
=== High school and juniors ===
Diggins competed for Stillwater Area High School's cross-country ski team. In 2008, Diggins was the top-ranked girls' individual cross-country skier in the Minnesota high school rankings. She won the Korteloppet races in 2008 and 2009 as part of the American Birkebeiner festival in Wisconsin while she was still in high school. She fell out of the Minnesota high school rankings in 2009 when she competed and won the United States Junior National Sprint title on March 9 of that year. She was added to the United States World Junior Cross-Country Ski Team in 2010.

=== Professional ===
==== 2011–2016 ====
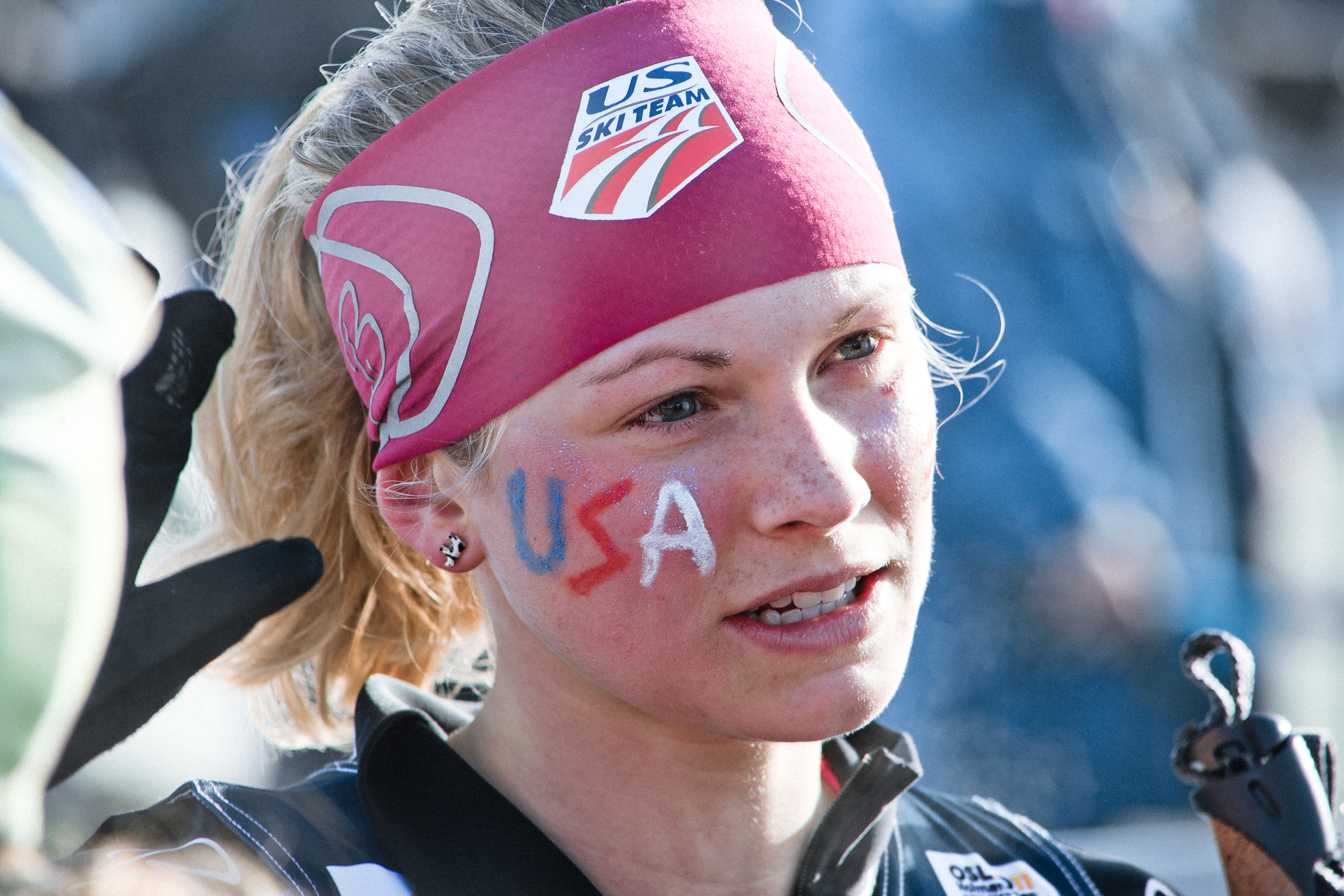
Diggins at the FIS Nordic World Ski Championships held at Holmenkollen in Oslo in 2011

Diggins earned an academic scholarship to Northern Michigan University but deferred enrollment to race with the Central Cross-Country Elite team for one year. She subsequently decided to race professionally rather than attend college. She was named to the United States Ski Team in 2011 and competed at her first World Championships that year.

Diggins won a gold medal with Kikkan Randall in the team sprint in the 2013 FIS Nordic World Ski Championships in Val di Fiemme. At the 2014 U23 World Championships, Diggins won silver in the individual sprint. Diggins was named to the U.S. team for the 2014 Winter Olympics. In her first event, the 15 kilometer skiathlon, Diggins placed eighth (out of 61 competitors) with a time of 40:05.5.

Diggins won the silver medal in the 10-kilometer freestyle race in the 2015 FIS Nordic World Ski Championships in Falun. In the 2015–16 World Cup, she placed eighth in the overall and sprint rankings and ninth in the distance ranking.

==== 2017–2019 ====
At the 2017 Nordic World Ski Championships in Lahti, Finland, Diggins took two medals: in the freestyle sprint, she won her quarterfinal and semifinal heats on her way to taking the silver, ahead of teammate Randall in third. Subsequently, in the classic team sprint, Diggins and Sadie Bjornsen finished third, catching and passing the Swedish team in the closing stages of the race to take the bronze by 0.19 seconds. This made Diggins the first American to win four World Championship medals in cross-country skiing.

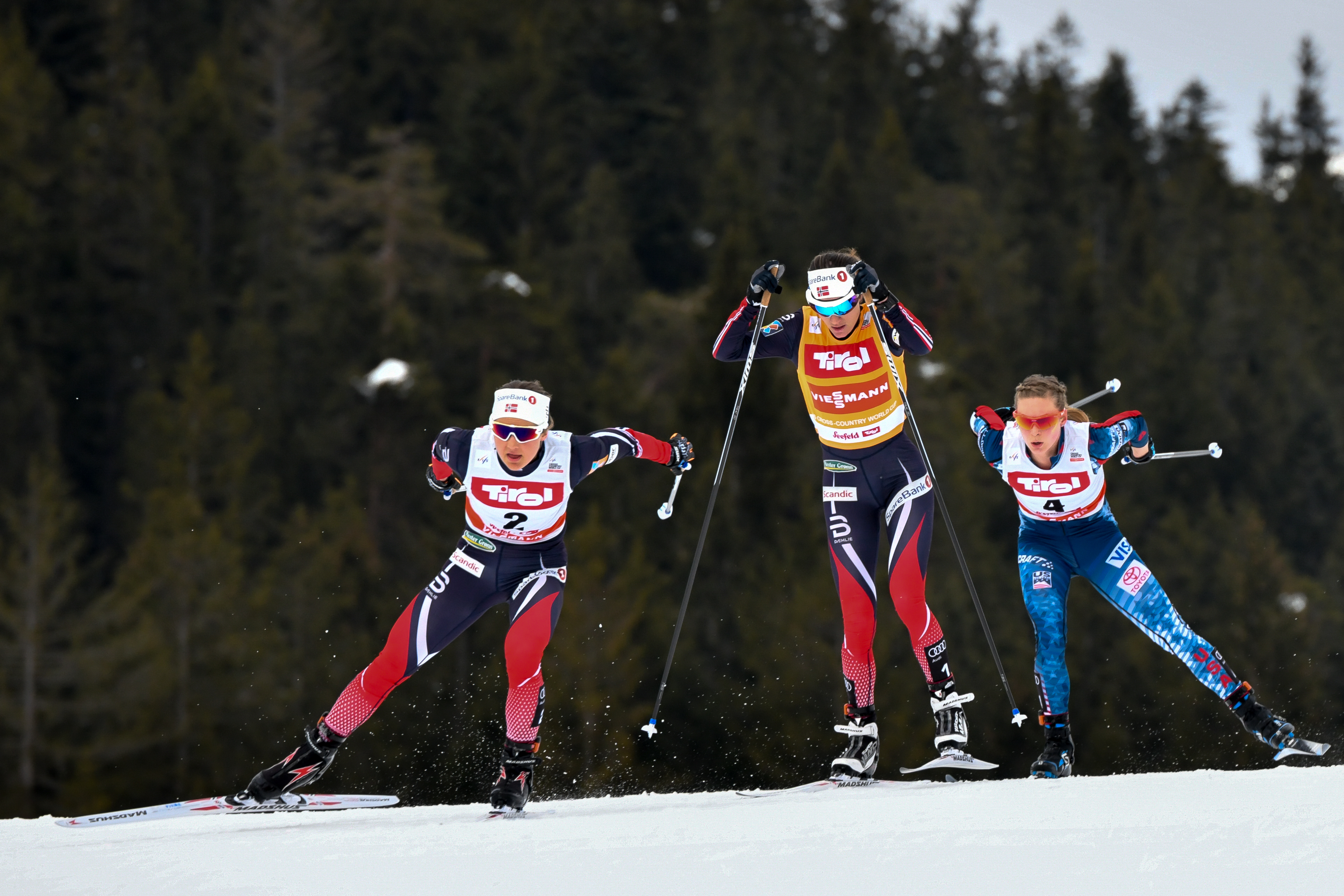
Diggins (at right) in Seefeld in 2018

Diggins finished third overall in the 2017–18 Tour de Ski, becoming the first American to finish on the podium in the overall classification, and beating her previous best of fifth overall in the previous edition. Her teammate Sadie Bjornsen finished ninth overall, also making it the first time that two Americans finished in the overall top 10. Diggins finished second overall in the World Cup 2017–2018 season standings.

At the 2018 Winter Olympics in Pyeongchang, South Korea, Diggins and Randall became the first American cross-country skiers to capture a gold medal by winning the women's team sprint at the Alpensia Cross-Country Centre. In the final sprint, Diggins passed the last two individual sprint classical gold medalists – Sochi gold medalist Maiken Caspersen Falla of Norway before the last turn and then Pyeongchang gold medalist Stina Nilsson of Sweden on the last straightaway. Theirs was not only the United States' first ever cross-country skiing gold medal but also the first American cross-country skiing medal since Bill Koch won silver in the men's 30 km in 1976. Steve Schlanger and Chad Salmela called the end of the race for NBC:

Salmela: As they come into the stadium, Diggins trying to get in on the outside!
Schlanger: Jessie Diggins with two fifth-place finishes, one-sixth, so close for the U.S. on so many occasions, now moving up on the outside into second place!
Salmela: They're all completely gassed! They've given it everything on the Klaebo-bakken! Stina Nilsson leading Jessie Diggins into the final turn – can Diggins answer?!
Schlanger: As the roars rattle around the cross-country stadium in Pyeongchang, Sweden, the U.S. and Norway coming to the line!
Salmela: Here comes Diggins! Here comes Diggins!
Schlanger: On the outside! Diggins making the play around Sweden!
Salmela: Yes! Yes! Yes! Yes! Gold!
Schlanger: Jessie Diggins to the line! And it is Jessie Diggins delivering a landmark moment that will be etched in U.S. Olympic history! The first-ever cross-country gold medal for the U.S.!
Salmela: It's a gold medal for the United States! It's not just a medal; it's the gold!

The play-by-play call of Diggins' victory with the line, "Here comes Diggins!", has become one of the most iconic moments in the United States' Olympic broadcast history.

Diggins competed in all six women's cross-country skiing events at the Olympics and finished in the top 10 in all of them. At the end of the games, she was the flag bearer for the United States in the closing ceremony.

==== 2020–2026 ====
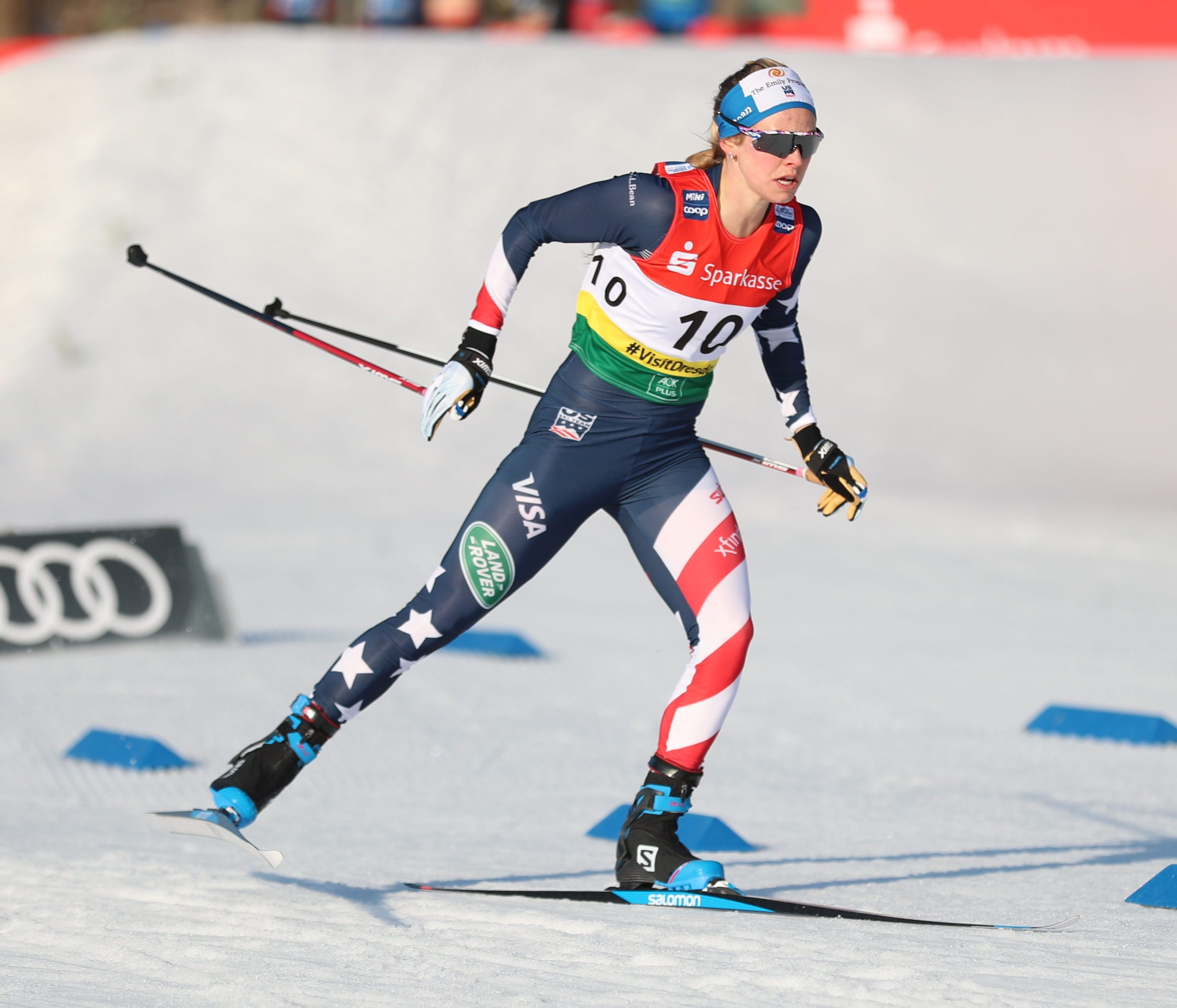
Diggins in Dresden in 2020

Diggins won the 2021 Tour de Ski, a first for an American. She placed atop the overall World Cup 2020–2021 season standings, claiming the biggest annual prize in cross-country skiing. Diggins' victory put her with Koch, who won the men's title in 1982, to be the only Americans to win overall season titles for a World Cup cross-country ski circuit.

At the 2022 Winter Olympics, Diggins won bronze in the women's sprint to become the first American to win an individual Olympic medal in a cross-country sprint. She went on to win silver in the women's 30 kilometer freestyle, earning the U.S.' last medal on the last day of the Olympics. She was the first non-European to win a medal in the event. Diggins left Beijing as the most decorated American cross-country skier of all time. For the second straight Olympics, she finished in the top 10 in all six women's cross-country skiing events.

In December 2022, Diggins broke the American record for World Cup cross-country ski wins with her fourteenth such win.

At the FIS Nordic World Ski Championships 2023 in Slovenia, Diggins and teammate Julia Kern won bronze in the team sprint. Two days later, Diggins won gold in the 10 km freestyle, which was the first top medal for an American in an individual event at any cross-country skiing world championship.

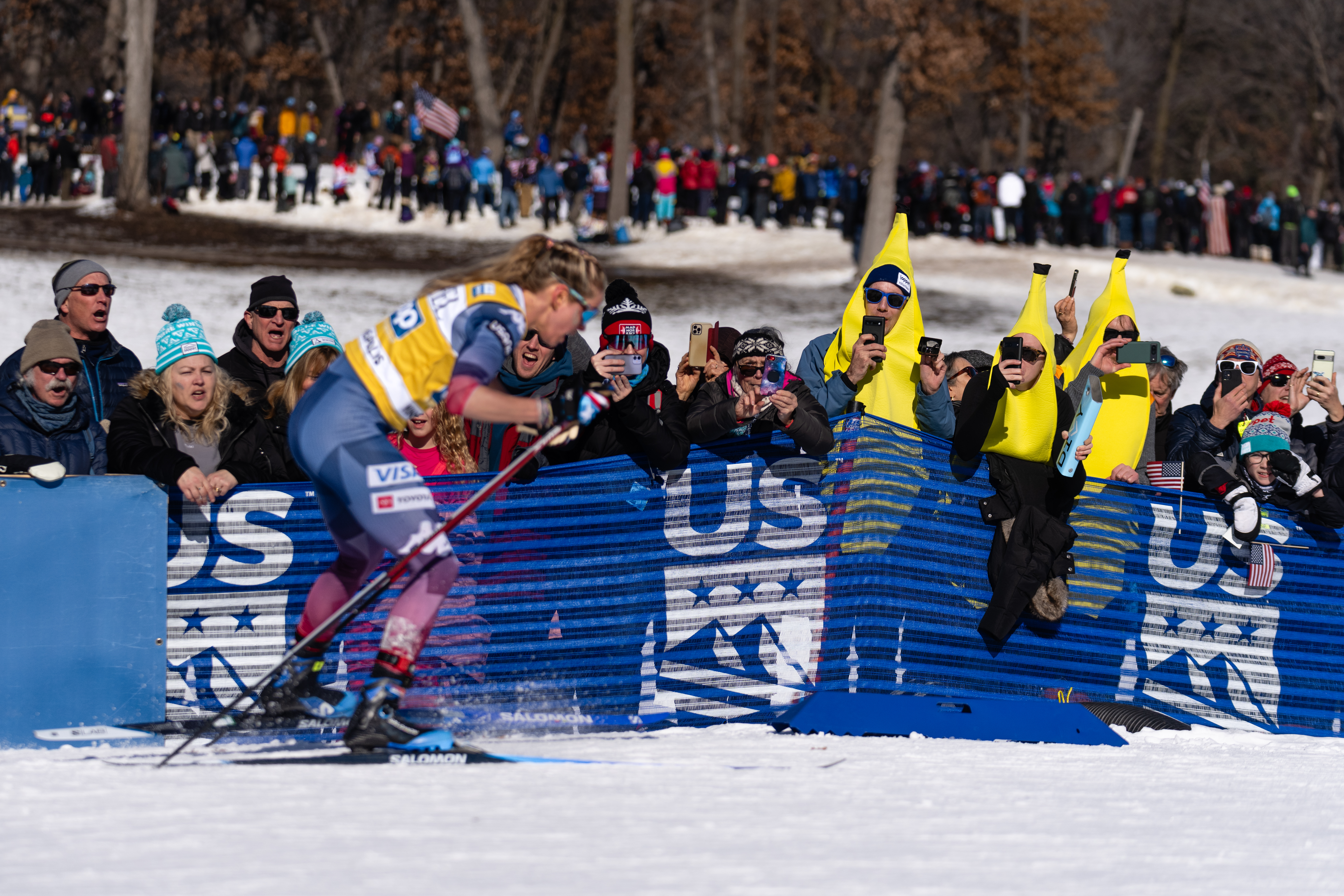
Diggins at the Stifel Loppet Cup in Minneapolis, 2024

Diggins posted the most successful season ever for an American skier during the 2023–24 FIS Cross-Country World Cup. She won the 2023–24 Tour de Ski, her second victory in the competition. While on break from the World Cup ski tour mid season, Diggins competed in the American Birkebeiner in Wisconsin, and won the 50 km freestyle race on February 24, 2024. For 2024, Diggins was awarded the Holmenkollen Medal, the highest Norwegian honor in skiing—Diggins was the first American to ever receive the distinction. For the 2023–24 World Cup season, Diggins claimed both the overall individual title—her second title after winning it in 2021—and the distance title. She set a United States' records with six victories and 12 podium finishes for the season.

Diggins won the 2024–25 FIS Cross-Country World Cup, overcoming a partially torn plantar fascia early in the season. Diggins never relinquished the top standing after reaching it after the first race weekend. For the season she reached the podium seven times, including six victories.

At the 2026 Winter Olympics in Italy, she suffered a crash during the first race of the games, with bruised ribs impacting her breathing, but fought her way to finish eighth in the skiathlon. A few days later, while in visible pain, Diggins won the bronze medal in the 10 kilometer freestyle.

Diggins won the women's overall and distance titles for the 2025–26 FIS Cross-Country World Cup season. She had previously announced it would be her final competitive season. Diggins clinched the titles in the final weekend of racing at Lake Placid.

=== Other pursuits ===
Following her retirement from top-level skiing, Diggins competed in ultra trail running. In 2026, she was the top female finisher in the Superior 100 Mile Trail Race.

== Cross-country skiing results ==
=== Olympic Games ===
- 4 medals – (1 gold, 1 silver, 2 bronze)

Year	Age	10 km individual	15/20 km skiathlon	30/50 km mass start	Sprint	4 × 5/7.5 km relay	Team sprint
2014	22	—	8	40	12	9	—
2018	26	5	5	7	6	5	Gold
2022	30	8	6	Silver	Bronze	6	5
2026	34	Bronze	8	5	17	5	5

=== World Championships ===
- 7 medals – (2 gold, 3 silver, 2 bronze)

Year	Age	10 km individual	15/20 km skiathlon	30/50 km mass start	Sprint	4 × 5/7.5 km relay	Team sprint
2011	19	—	28	—	29	9	—
2013	21	23	—	DNF	—	4	Gold
2015	23	Silver	—	DNF	—	4	8
2017	25	—	DNF	5	Silver	4	Bronze
2019	27	25	—	4	8	5	5
2021	29	4	15	—	24	4	—
2023	31	Gold	—	—	21	5	Bronze
2025	33	—	13	22	23	6	Silver

=== World Cup ===
==== Season titles ====
- 8 titles – (4 Overall, 4 Distance)

Season	
Season	Discipline
2021	Overall
2021	Distance
2024	Overall
2024	Distance
2025	Overall
2025	Distance
2026	Overall
2026	Distance

==== Season standings ====
Season	Age	Discipline standings			Ski Tour standings				
Season	Age	Overall	Distance	Sprint	Nordic Opening	Tour de Ski	Ski Tour 2020	World Cup Final	Ski Tour Canada
2011	19	NC	—	NC	—	—	—N/a	—	—N/a
2012	20	34	26	35	—	—	—N/a	15	—N/a
2013	21	36	34	44	24	21	—N/a	26	—N/a
2014	22	20	21	23	24	13	—N/a	36	—N/a
2015	23	22	17	23	44	DNF	—N/a	—N/a	—N/a
2016	24	8	9	8	38	10	—N/a	—N/a	5
2017	25	6	7	10	8	5	—N/a	16	—N/a
2018	26	2nd place, silver medalist(s)	3rd place, bronze medalist(s)	6	12	3rd place, bronze medalist(s)	—N/a	2nd place, silver medalist(s)	—N/a
2019	27	6	6	7	13	6	—N/a	14	—N/a
2020	28	6	8	11	5	9	6	—N/a	—N/a
2021	29	1st place, gold medalist(s)	1st place, gold medalist(s)	4	15	1st place, gold medalist(s)	—N/a	—N/a	—N/a
2022	30	2nd place, silver medalist(s)	9	4	—N/a	8	—N/a	—N/a	—N/a
2023	31	2nd place, silver medalist(s)	2nd place, silver medalist(s)	11	—N/a	11	—N/a	—N/a	—N/a
2024	32	1st place, gold medalist(s)	1st place, gold medalist(s)	5	—N/a	1st place, gold medalist(s)	—N/a	—N/a	—N/a
2025	33	1st place, gold medalist(s)	1st place, gold medalist(s)	7	—N/a	3rd place, bronze medalist(s)	—N/a	—N/a	—N/a
2026	34	1st place, gold medalist(s)	1st place, gold medalist(s)	7	—N/a	1st place, gold medalist(s)	—N/a	—N/a	—N/a

==== Individual podiums ====
- 31 victories – (18 WC, 13 SWC)
- 79 podiums – (47 WC, 32 SWC)

No.	Season	Date	Location	Race	Level	Place
1	2015–16	January 8, 2016	Toblach, Italy	5 km Individual F	Stage World Cup	1st
2	2015–16	January 23, 2016	Nové Město, Czech Republic	10 km Individual F	World Cup	3rd
3	2015–16	February 20, 2016	Lahti, Finland	1.6 km Sprint F	World Cup	2nd
4	2015–16	March 1, 2016	Gatineau, Canada	1.7 km Sprint F	Stage World Cup	3rd
5	2015–16	March 12, 2016	Canmore, Canada	10 km Pursuit C	Stage World Cup	3rd
6	2016–17	December 3, 2016	Lillehammer, Norway	5 km Individual F	Stage World Cup	1st
7	2016–17	January 3, 2017	Oberstdorf, Germany	5 km + 5 km Skiathlon C/F	Stage World Cup	2nd
8	2016–17	January 6, 2017	Toblach, Italy	5 km Individual F	Stage World Cup	1st
9	2017–18	January 1, 2018	Lenzerheide, Switzerland	10 km Pursuit F	Stage World Cup	3rd
10	2017–18	January 7, 2018	Val di Fiemme, Italy	9 km Pursuit F	Stage World Cup	3rd
11	2017–18	December 30, 2017 – January 7, 2018	(Switzerland) (Germany) (Italy) Tour de Ski	Overall Standings	World Cup	3rd
12	2017–18	January 28, 2018	Seefeld, Austria	10 km Mass Start F	World Cup	1st
13	2017–18	March 7, 2018	Drammen, Norway	1.2 km Sprint C	World Cup	3rd
14	2017–18	March 11, 2018	Oslo, Norway	30 km Mass Start F	World Cup	2nd
15	2017–18	March 18, 2018	Falun, Sweden	10 km Pursuit F	Stage World Cup	1st
16	2017–18	March 16–18, 2018	(Sweden) World Cup Final	Overall Standings	World Cup	2nd
17	2018–19	December 29, 2018	Toblach, Italy	1.3 km Sprint F	Stage World Cup	3rd
18	2018–19	January 1, 2019	Val Müstair, Switzerland	1.4 km Sprint F	Stage World Cup	3rd
19	2018–19	January 3, 2019	Oberstdorf, Germany	10 km Pursuit F	Stage World Cup	3rd
20	2018–19	February 16, 2019	Cogne, Italy	1.6 km Sprint F	World Cup	1st
21	2018–19	March 17, 2019	Falun, Sweden	10 km Individual F	World Cup	3rd
22	2019–20	December 1, 2019	Rukatunturi, Finland	10 km Pursuit F	Stage World Cup	3rd
23	2019–20	December 7, 2019	Lillehammer, Norway	7.5 km + 7.5 km Skiathlon C/F	World Cup	2nd
24	2019–20	December 15, 2019	Davos, Switzerland	10 km Individual F	World Cup	3rd
25	2019–20	January 4, 2020	Val di Fiemme, Italy	1.3 km Sprint C	Stage World Cup	3rd
26	2019–20	January 26, 2020	Oberstdorf, Germany	1.5 km Sprint C	World Cup	3rd
27	2020–21	January 1, 2021	Val Müstair, Switzerland	1.4 km Sprint F	Stage World Cup	3rd
28	2020–21	January 2, 2021	Val Müstair, Switzerland	10 km Mass Start C	Stage World Cup	3rd
29	2020–21	January 3, 2021	Val Müstair, Switzerland	10 km Pursuit F	Stage World Cup	1st
30	2020–21	January 5, 2021	Toblach, Italy	10 km Individual F	Stage World Cup	1st
31	2020–21	January 6, 2021	Toblach, Italy	10 km Pursuit C	Stage World Cup	3rd
32	2020–21	January 9, 2021	Val di Fiemme, Italy	10 km Mass Start F	Stage World Cup	2nd
33	2020–21	January 1–10, 2021	(Switzerland) (Italy) Tour de Ski	Overall Standings	World Cup	1st
34	2020–21	January 29, 2021	Falun, Sweden	10 km Individual F	World Cup	1st
35	2020–21	February 6, 2021	Ulricehamn, Sweden	1.3 km Sprint F	World Cup	3rd
36	2021–22	December 3, 2021	Lillehammer, Norway	1.6 km Sprint F	World Cup	2nd
37	2021–22	December 12, 2021	Davos, Switzerland	10 km Individual F	World Cup	2nd
38	2021–22	December 28, 2021	Lenzerheide, Switzerland	1.5 km Sprint F	Stage World Cup	1st
39	2021–22	December 31, 2021	Oberstdorf, Germany	10 km Mass Start F	Stage World Cup	1st
40	2021–22	March 12, 2022	Falun, Sweden	10 km Individual F	World Cup	3rd
41	2022–23	December 2, 2022	Lillehammer, Norway	10 km Individual F	World Cup	1st
42	2022–23	December 17, 2022	Davos, Switzerland	1.5 km Sprint F	World Cup	2nd
43	2022–23	December 18, 2022	Davos, Switzerland	20 km Individual F	World Cup	1st
44	2022–23	January 27, 2023	Les Rousses, France	10 km Individual F	World Cup	3rd
45	2022–23	February 3, 2023	Toblach, Italy	1.4 km Sprint F	World Cup	3rd
46	2022–23	February 4, 2023	Toblach, Italy	10 km Individual F	World Cup	2nd
47	2022–23	March 12, 2023	Oslo, Norway	50 km Mass Start F	World Cup	3rd
48	2023–24	November 26, 2023	Rukatunturi, Finland	20 km Mass Start F	World Cup	2nd
49	2023–24	December 2, 2023	Gällivare, Sweden	10 km Individual F	World Cup	1st
50	2023–24	December 10, 2023	Östersund, Sweden	10 km Individual F	World Cup	1st
51	2023–24	December 16, 2023	Trondheim, Norway	10 km + 10 km Skiathlon C/F	World Cup	2nd
52	2023–24	December 31, 2023	Toblach, Italy	10 km Individual C	Stage World Cup	3rd
53	2023–24	January 1, 2024	Toblach, Italy	20 km Pursuit F	Stage World Cup	1st
54	2023–24	January 3, 2024	Davos, Switzerland	1.2 km Sprint F	Stage World Cup	3rd
55	2023–24	January 4, 2024	Davos, Switzerland	20 km Pursuit C	Stage World Cup	3rd
56	2023–24	December 30, 2023 – January 7, 2024	(Italy) (Switzerland) Tour de Ski	Overall Standings	World Cup	1st
57	2023–24	January 28, 2024	Goms, Switzerland	20 km Mass Start F	World Cup	1st
58	2023–24	February 9, 2024	Canmore, Canada	15 km Mass Start F	World Cup	1st
59	2023–24	February 18, 2024	(United States) Minneapolis, USA	10 km Individual F	World Cup	3rd
60	2023–24	March 17, 2024	Falun, Sweden	20 km Mass Start F	World Cup	1st
61	2024–25	December 1, 2024	Rukatunturi, Finland	20 km Mass Start F	World Cup	1st
62	2024–25	December 8, 2024	Lillehammer, Norway	10 km + 10 km Skiathlon C/F	World Cup	3rd
63	2024–25	December 28, 2024	Toblach, Italy	1.4 km Sprint F	Stage World Cup	1st
64	2024–25	December 29, 2024	Toblach, Italy	15 km Mass Start C	Stage World Cup	1st
65	2024–25	December 28, 2024 – January 5, 2025	(Italy) Tour de Ski	Overall Standings	World Cup	3rd
66	2024–25	January 17, 2025	Les Rousses, France	10 km Individual F	World Cup	1st
67	2024–25	February 2, 2025	Cogne, Italy	10 km Individual F	World Cup	1st
68	2024–25	February 16, 2025	Falun, Sweden	20 km Mass Start F	World Cup	1st
69	2025–26	November 30, 2025	Rukatunturi, Finland	20 km Mass Start F	World Cup	2nd
70	2025–26	December 6, 2025	Trondheim, Norway	10 km + 10 km Skiathlon C/F	World Cup	1st
71	2025–26	December 7, 2025	Trondheim, Norway	10 km Individual F	World Cup	3rd
72	2025–26	December 29, 2025	Toblach, Italy	10 km Individual C	Stage World Cup	3rd
73	2025–26	December 31, 2025	Toblach, Italy	5 km Heat Mass Start F	Stage World Cup	1st
74	2025–26	January 1, 2026	Toblach, Italy	20 km Pursuit C	Stage World Cup	1st
75	2025–26	January 4, 2026	Val di Fiemme, Italy	10 km Mass Start F	Stage World Cup	2nd
76	2025–26	December 28, 2025 – January 4, 2026	(Italy) Tour de Ski	Overall Standings	World Cup	1st
77	2025–26	January 25, 2026	Goms, Switzerland	20 km Mass Start C	World Cup	2nd
78	2025–26	March 1, 2026	Falun, Sweden	10 km + 10 km Skiathlon C/F	World Cup	2nd
79	2025–26	March 8, 2026	Lahti, Finland	10 km Individual C	World Cup	3rd

==== Team podiums ====
- 2 victories – (1 RL, 1 TS)
- 11 podiums – (8 RL, 3 TS)

No.	Season	Date	Location	Race	Level	Place	Teammate(s)
1	2011–12	January 15, 2012	Milan, Italy	6 × 1.4 km Team Sprint F	World Cup	2nd	Randall
2	2012–13	November 25, 2012	Gällivare, Sweden	4 × 5 km Relay C/F	World Cup	3rd	Brooks / Randall / Stephen
3	2012–13	December 7, 2012	Quebec City, Canada	6 × 1.6 km Team Sprint F	World Cup	1st	Randall
4	2013–14	December 8, 2013	Lillehammer, Norway	4 × 5 km Relay C/F	World Cup	3rd	Randall / Bjornsen / Stephen
5	2015–16	December 6, 2015	Lillehammer, Norway	4 × 5 km Relay C/F	World Cup	3rd	Brennan / Bjornsen / Stephen
6	2015–16	January 24, 2016	Nové Město, Czech Republic	4 × 5 km Relay C/F	World Cup	2nd	Caldwell / Bjornsen / Stephen
7	2019–20	December 8, 2019	Lillehammer, Norway	4 × 5 km Relay C/F	World Cup	2nd	Caldwell / Bjornsen / Brennan
8	2021–22	December 19, 2021	Dresden, Germany	12 × 0.65 km Team Sprint F	World Cup	2nd	Kern
9	2021–22	March 13, 2022	Falun, Sweden	4 × 5 km Mixed Relay F	World Cup	1st	Brennan / Ketterson / Patterson
10	2022–23	February 5, 2023	Toblach, Italy	4 × 7.5 km Relay C/F	World Cup	3rd	Swirbul / Brennan / Kern
11	2023–24	December 3, 2023	Gällivare, Sweden	4 × 7.5 km Relay C/F	World Cup	3rd	Brennan / Laukli / Kern

=== US National Championships ===
The table includes medals only, not all race placements.

- 11 medals – (7 gold, 3 silver, 1 bronze)

No.	Year	Location	Event	Place
1	2011	(United States) Rumford, Maine	Sprint freestyle	1st place, gold medalist(s)
2	2011	(United States) Sun Valley, Idaho	30 km classic mass start	3rd place, bronze medalist(s)
3	2012	(United States) Rumford, Maine	Sprint freestyle	1st place, gold medalist(s)
4	2012	(United States) Rumford, Maine	10 km freestyle	1st place, gold medalist(s)
5	2012	(United States) Rumford, Maine	20 km classic mass start	1st place, gold medalist(s)
6	2012	(United States) Rumford, Maine	Sprint classic	2nd place, silver medalist(s)
7	2012	(United States) Craftsbury, Vermont	30 km freestyle mass start	2nd place, silver medalist(s)
8	2016	(United States) Craftsbury, Vermont	30 km freestyle mass start	1st place, gold medalist(s)
9	2018	(United States) Craftsbury, Vermont	30 km freestyle mass start	1st place, gold medalist(s)
10	2025	(United States) Lake Placid, New York	Sprint freestyle	2nd place, silver medalist(s)
11	2025	(United States) Lake Placid, New York	40 km classic mass start	1st place, gold medalist(s)

== Personal life ==
=== Family ===
Both of Diggins parents are originally from Canada. Diggins holds dual United States and Canadian citizenship. She has maintained close ties to family in Thunder Bay, Ontario, where her father's family is from. Diggins married Wade Poplawski in 2022. Poplawski, a native of Winnipeg, Manitoba, is a former minor league hockey player for the Rapid City Rush. The couple lives in the suburbs of Boston, Massachusetts. Diggins had trained in Vermont.

=== Social activism ===
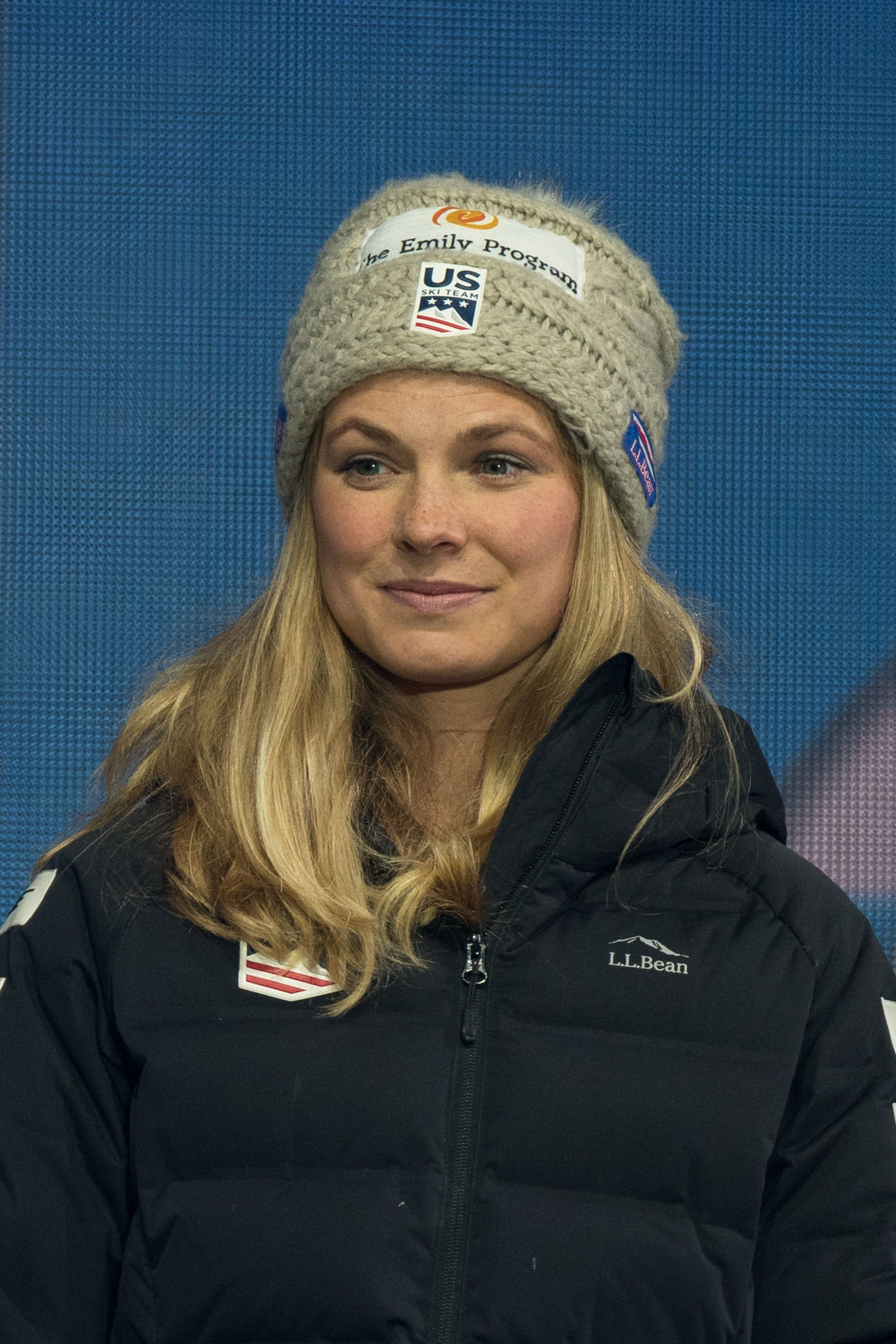
Diggins, wearing an Emily Program logo on her hat, in 2019

Diggins is an ambassador for the non-profit organization Fast and Female, which inspires girls ages 8–18 to be active and empowered in sports. Diggins is also an ambassador for the non-profit organization Protect Our Winters (POW), whose aim is to effect systemic solutions to climate change through the outdoor sports community. Diggins traveled with POW to Capitol Hill in April 2018 to raise concerns over climate change.

=== Eating disorder awareness ===
In 2019, Diggins became a spokesperson for the Emily Program, an organization in the United States that provides treatment for eating disorders. In several interviews and essays, she revealed her experience of seeking treatment for bulimia at the organization in 2010, with the aim of using her story to help improve self-acceptance and reduce stigma and secrecy around eating disorders for others. In 2020, Diggins wrote an autobiography, Brave Enough, about her athletic accomplishments and personal struggles with bulimia as a teenager. After 12 years in recovery, Diggins said in media interviews that she had a relapse in 2023 ahead of the cross-country ski season.

== Impact on skiing ==
Diggins is credited with elevating the stature of cross-country skiing in the United States. After winning an Olympic gold medal, she used her clout to successfully lobby for the United States to host a World Cup cross-country skiing event, culminating in the 2024 Stifel Loppet Cup held in Minneapolis, the first of such events in decades. Diggins' popularity was a factor in the cross-country skiing World Cup racing circuit to return again to the United States in 2026 for the Stifle Lake Placid Finals at Mount Van Hoevenberg in New York.

She is considered the greatest American cross-country skier of all time and one of the greatest American endurance athletes. Diggins became most known for pushing the limits of physical endurance in cross-country skiing, which she characterized as having her body enter a "pain cave". Numerous video clips of her collapsing in exhaustion at the end of races have circulated on the Internet. In 2026, Peacock released Threshold, a documentary about Diggins' athletic abilities and mental health resiliency.

== Bibliography ==
- Diggins, Jessie and Smith, Todd (2020). Brave Enough. ISBN 978-1517908195

== See also ==
- Rosie Brennan
