= Gooseberry Falls State Park =

State park in Minnesota, United States

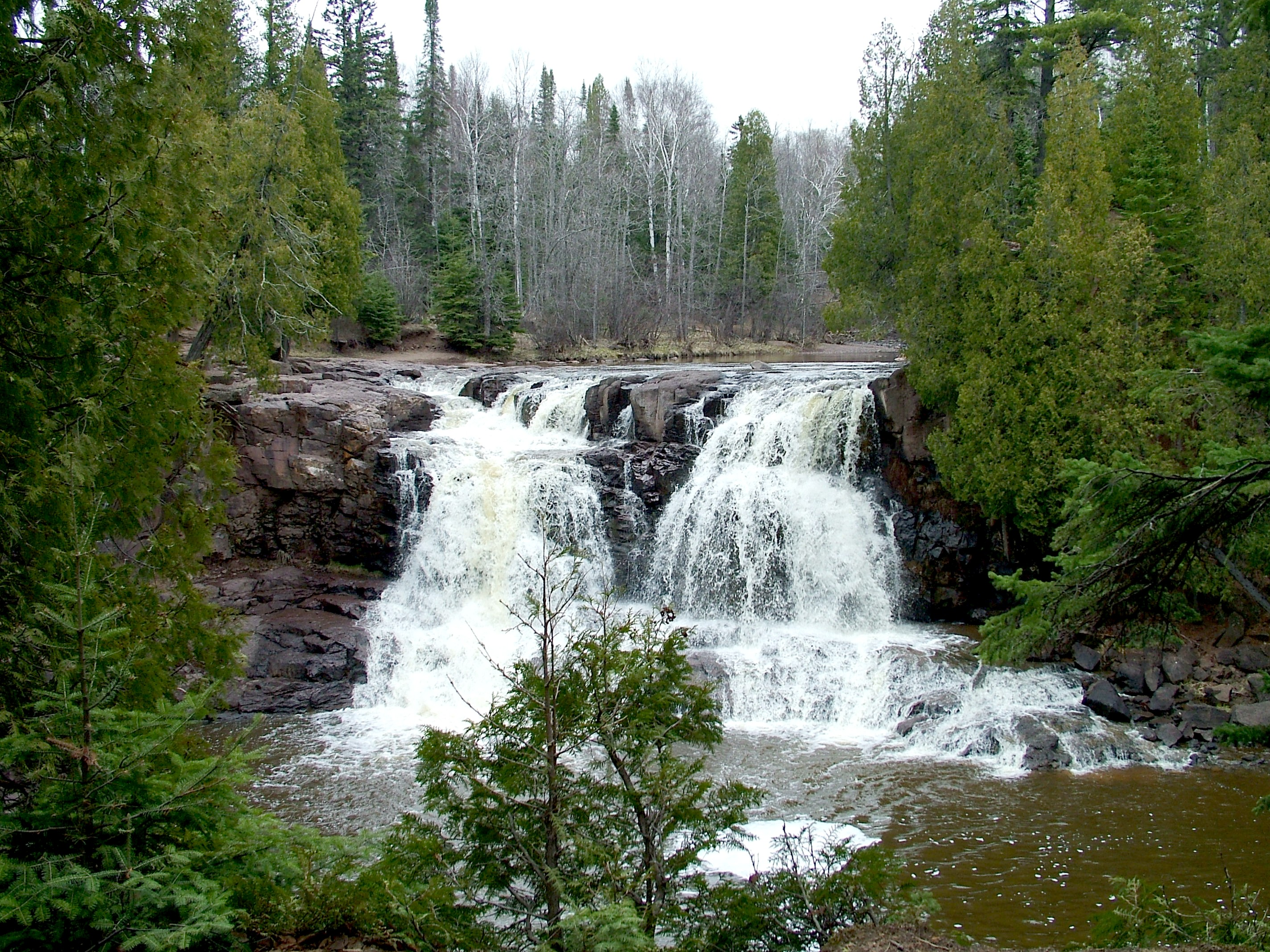
- Upper Gooseberry Falls

- Location within Minnesota Location within the United States
- Location: Lake, Minnesota, United States
- Coordinates: 47°08′49″N 91°27′48″W
- Area: 1,687 acres (6.83 km^{2})
- Elevation: 833 ft (254 m)
- Established: 1937
- Governing body: Minnesota Department of Natural Resources

Gooseberry Falls State Park is a state park of Minnesota, United States, on the North Shore of Lake Superior. The park is located in Silver Creek Township, about 13 miles (21 km) northeast of Two Harbors, Minnesota in Lake County on scenic Minnesota Highway 61. The park surrounds the mouth of the Gooseberry River and includes Upper, Middle, and Lower Falls.

== History and facilities ==
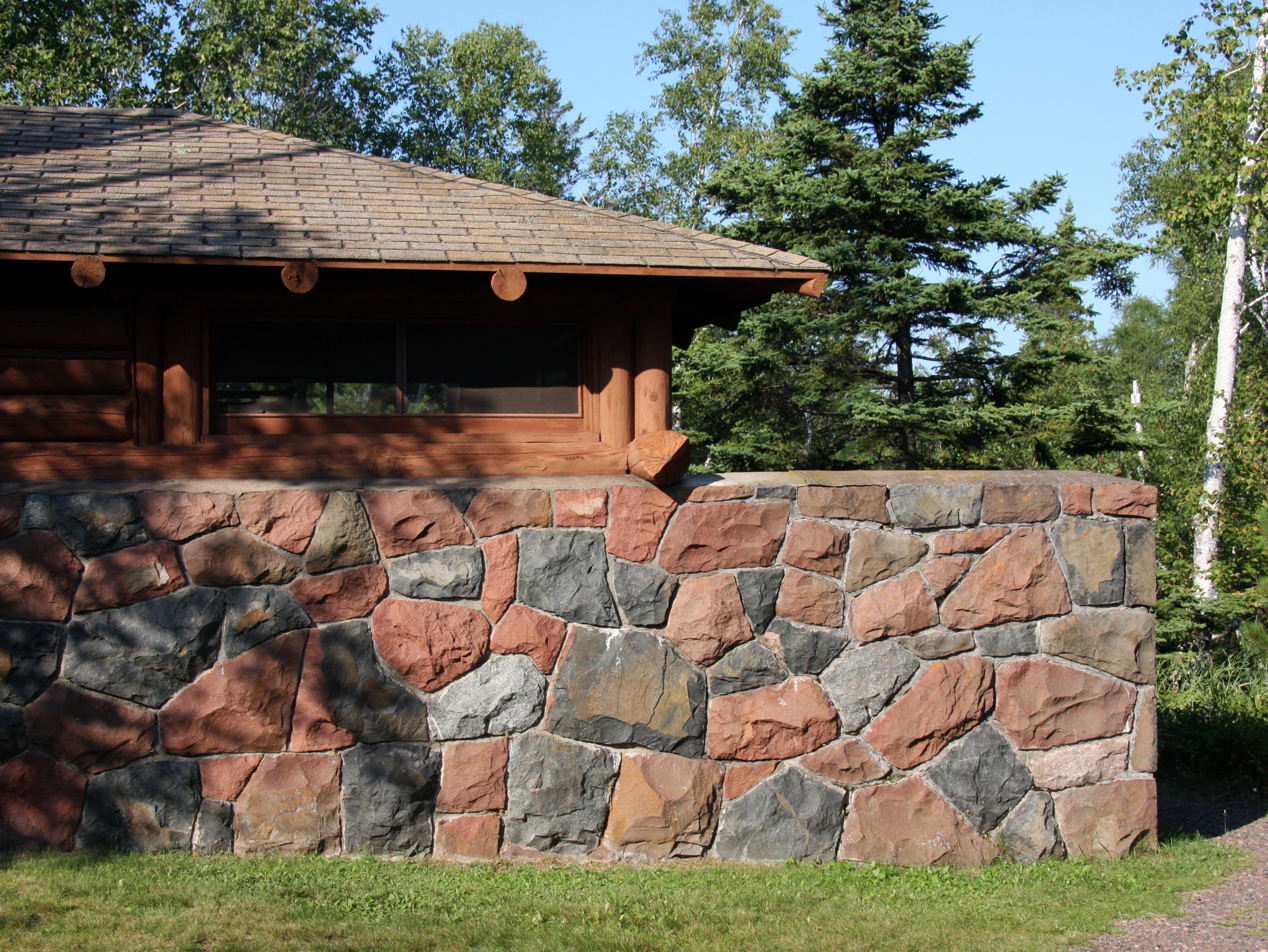
CCC built shelter in the park

The Minnesota Legislature authorized preservation of the area around Gooseberry Falls in 1933, and the area was officially designated Gooseberry Falls State Park in 1937. The rustic style resources in Gooseberry Falls State Park were constructed by the Civilian Conservation Corps between 1934 and 1941. The structures are notable for their stone construction, using red, blue, brown, and black basalt. The designs were supervised by the Minnesota Central Design Office of the National Park Service and construction was supervised by two Italian stonemasons. In 1996, the Joseph N. Alexander visitor center was built, providing space for interpretive displays, a cinema screening room, and a gift shop. The visitor center hosts public events including nature, wildlife, astronomy, and music programs.

This park provides 70 non-electric camping sites that are available year-round. There are 18 miles (29 km) of hiking trails, including 8 miles (13 km) of mountain bike trails. The trails connect to the Superior Hiking Trail. There are popular picnic and swimming spots on the trails.

== Park geology ==
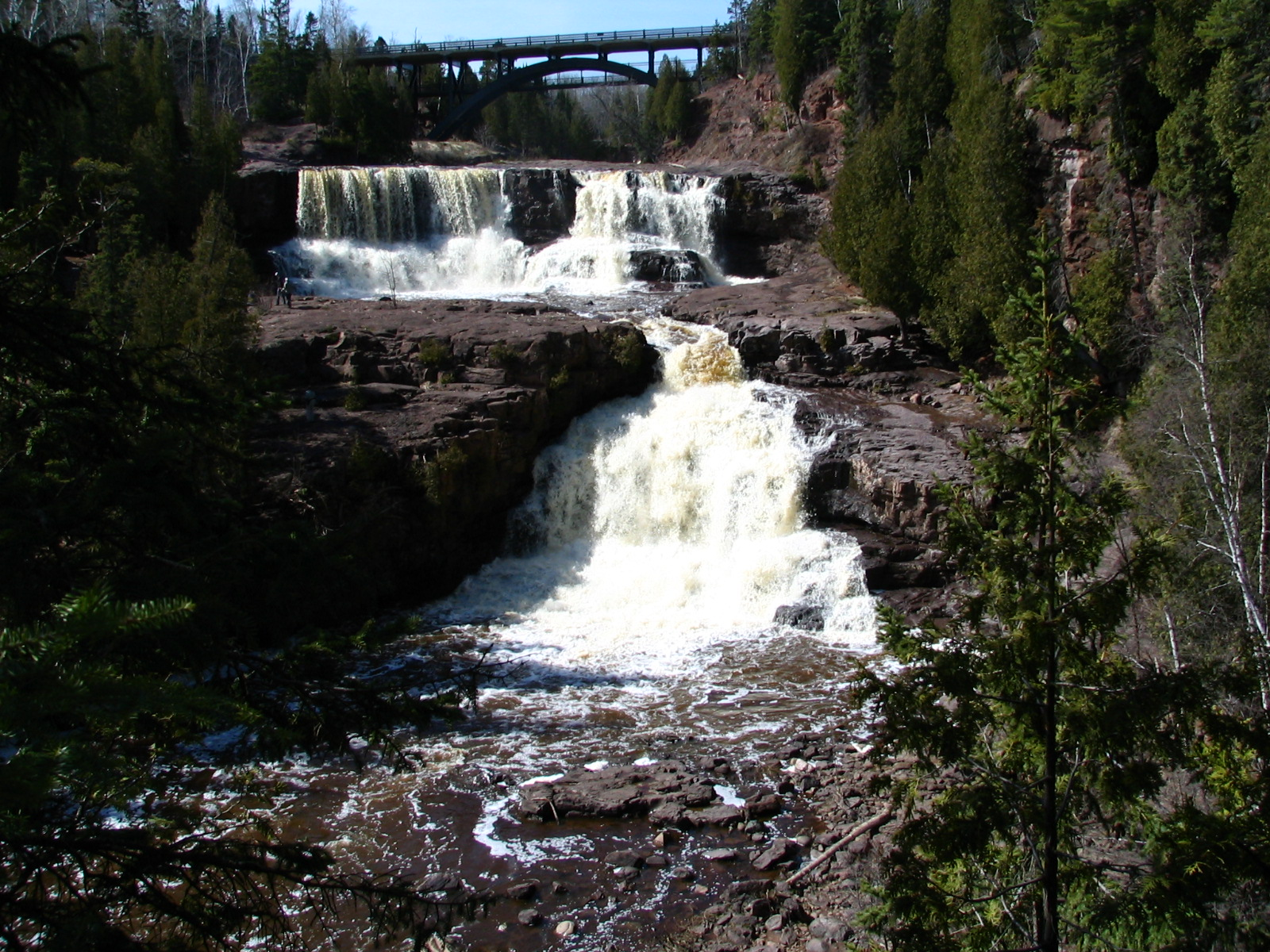
Lower Gooseberry Falls with a highway bridge in the background

The north shore of Lake Superior is almost entirely underlain by a series of at least 19 lava flows. The Gooseberry River has cut through the flows from the uppermost layer to the lower falls where it flows into Lake Superior. Three distinct layers of lava can be seen from the highway bridge. The lower flows were more compact and hard, but the upper flows were vesicular, containing pockets that later filled with various minerals including those that formed the Lake Superior agates which can be found along the beach where the river ends in Lake Superior.

== Wildlife ==
This park is home to the mammalian species white-tailed deer, Canadian lynx, American black bear, American marten, and the subspecies, timber wolf. Fish that swim in the lakes are migratory salmon and trout. Types of birds that can be seen are ravens and herring gulls.

== Gallery ==
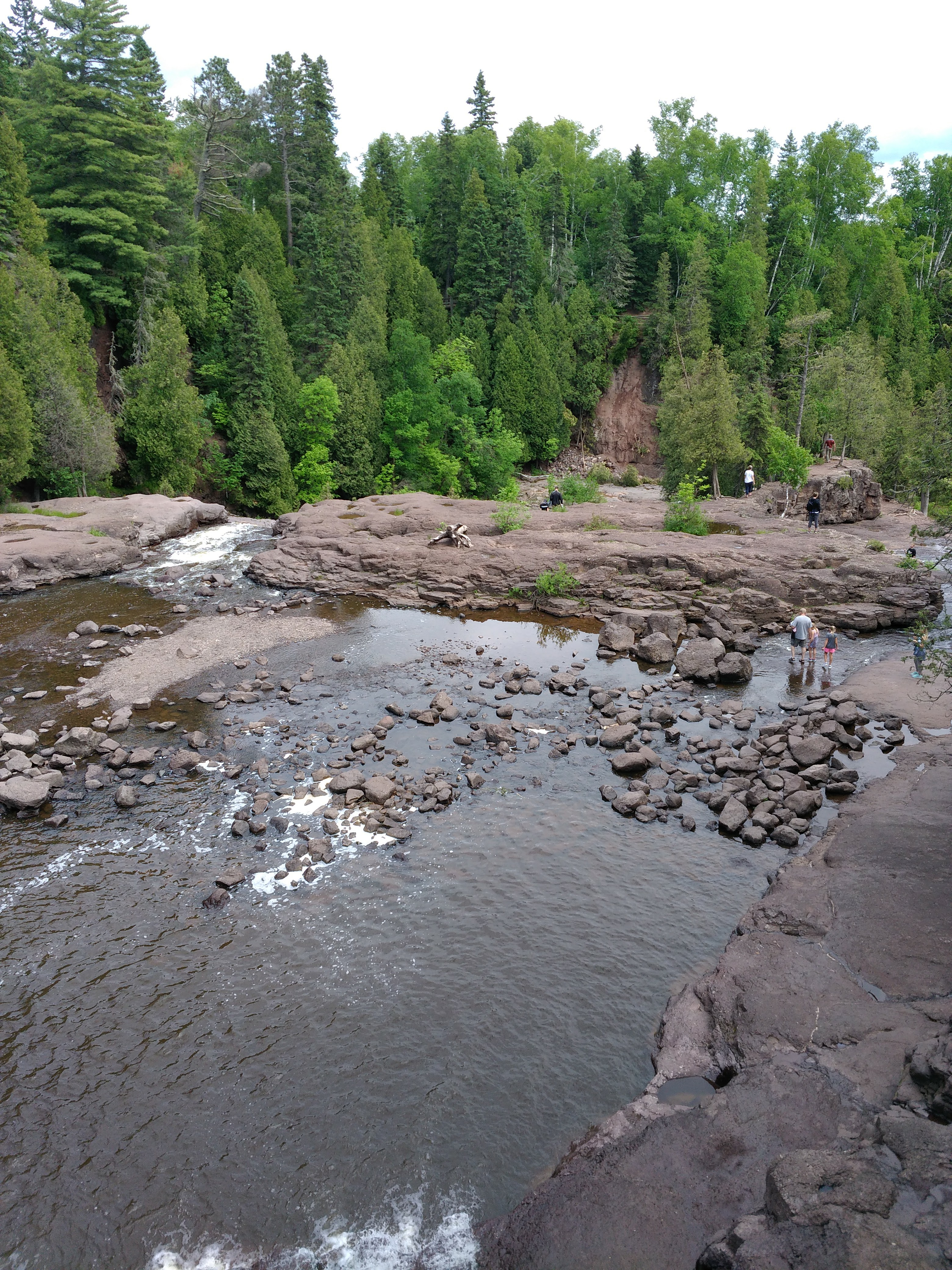

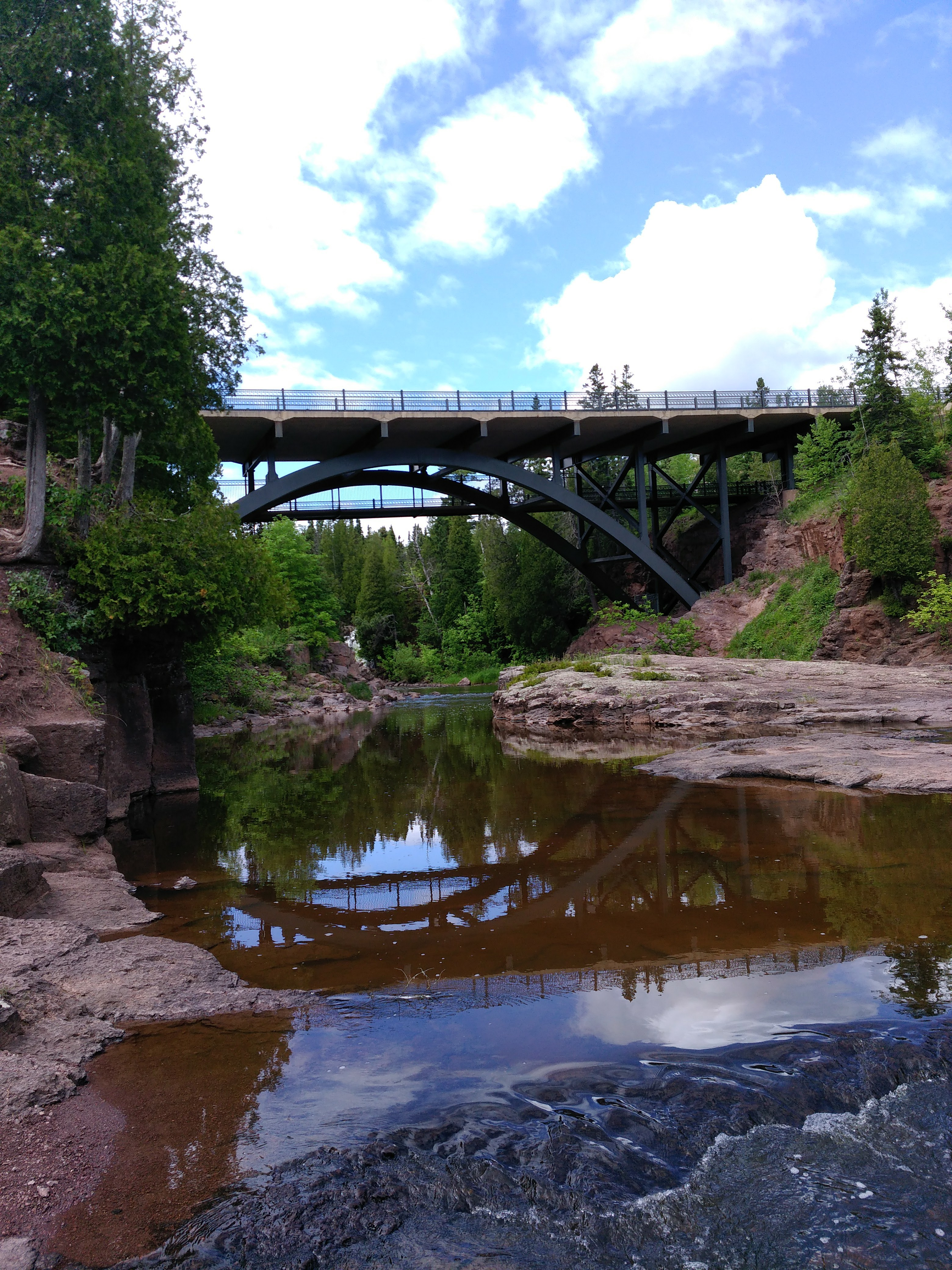

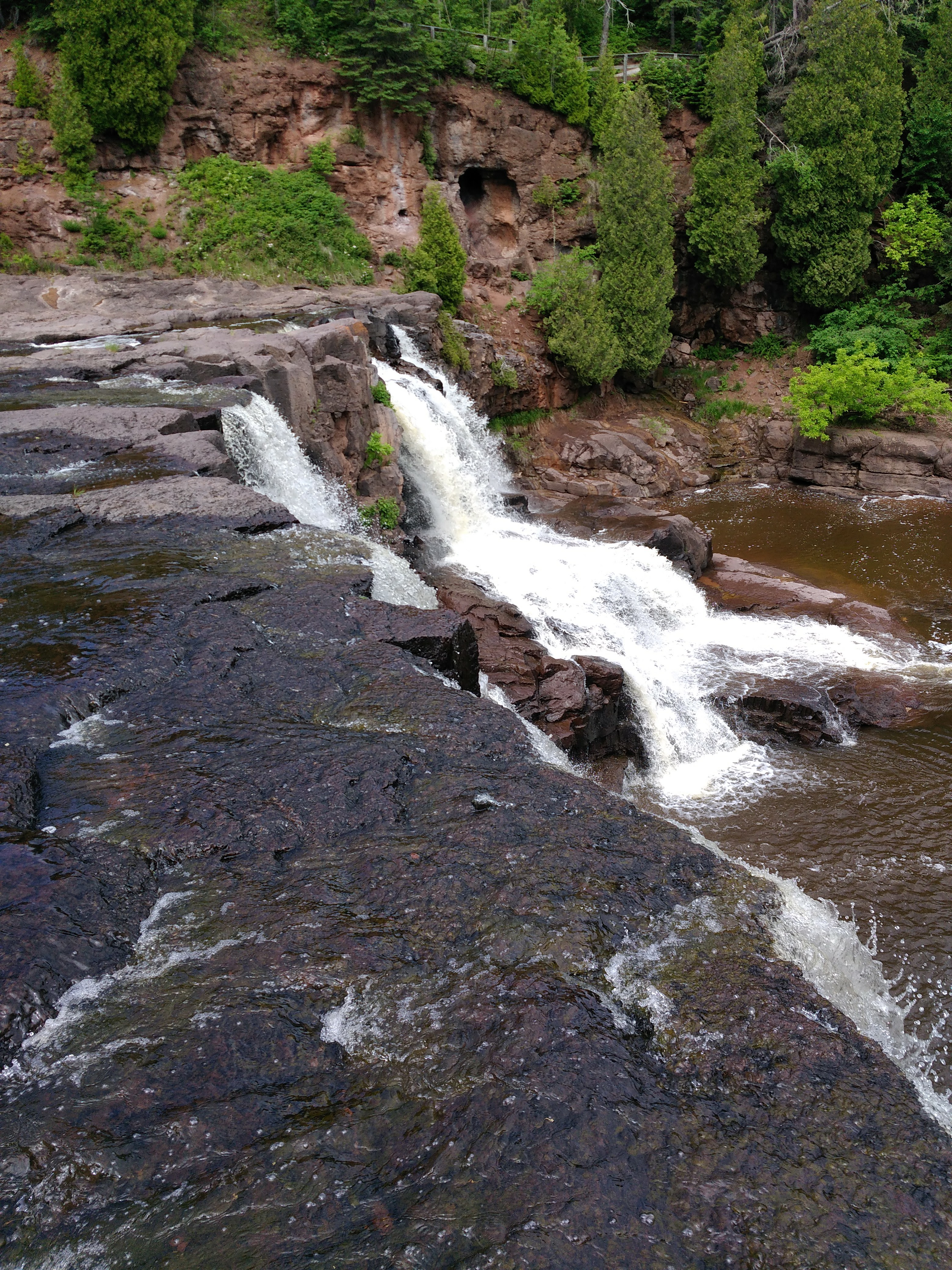

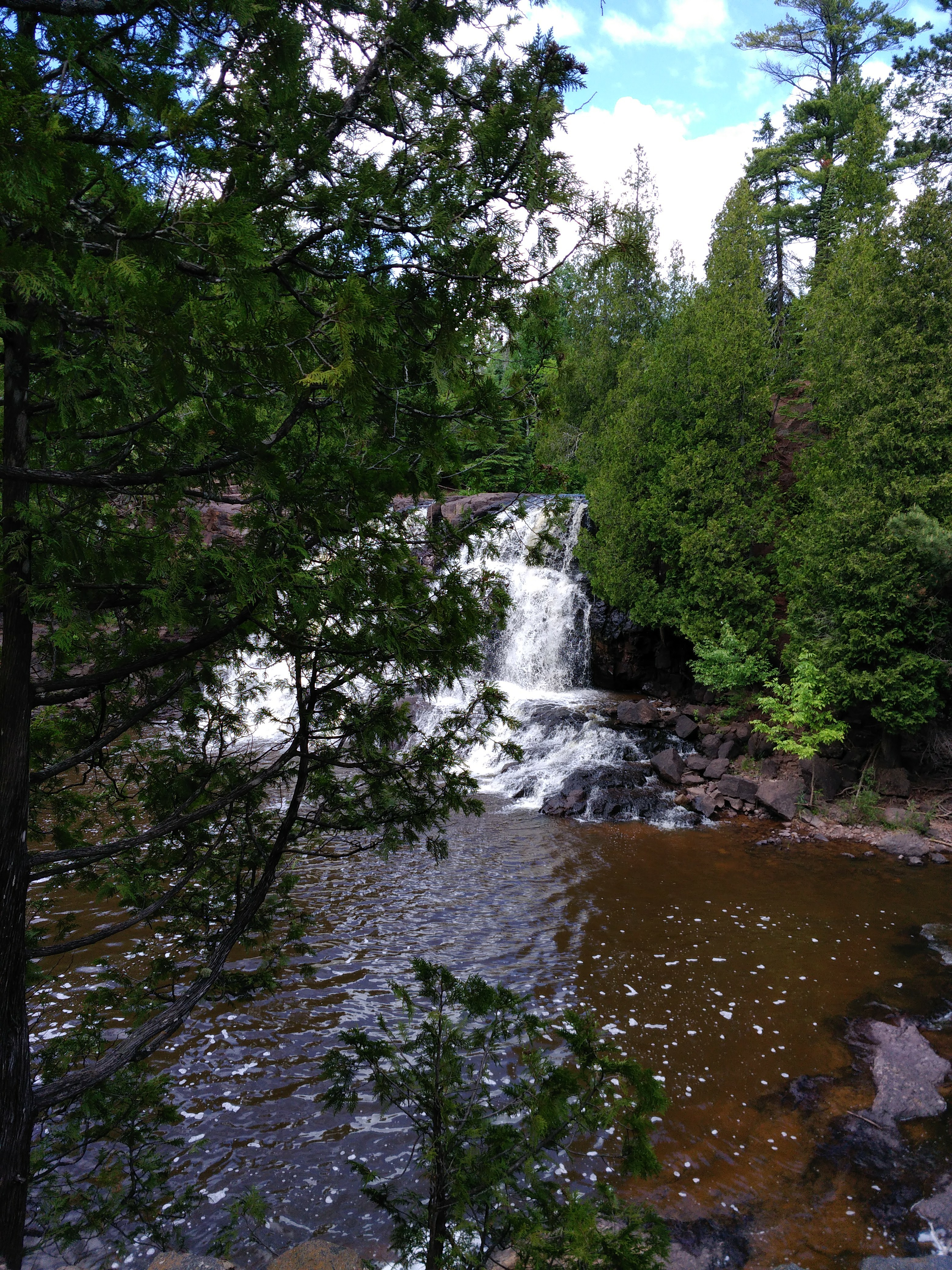

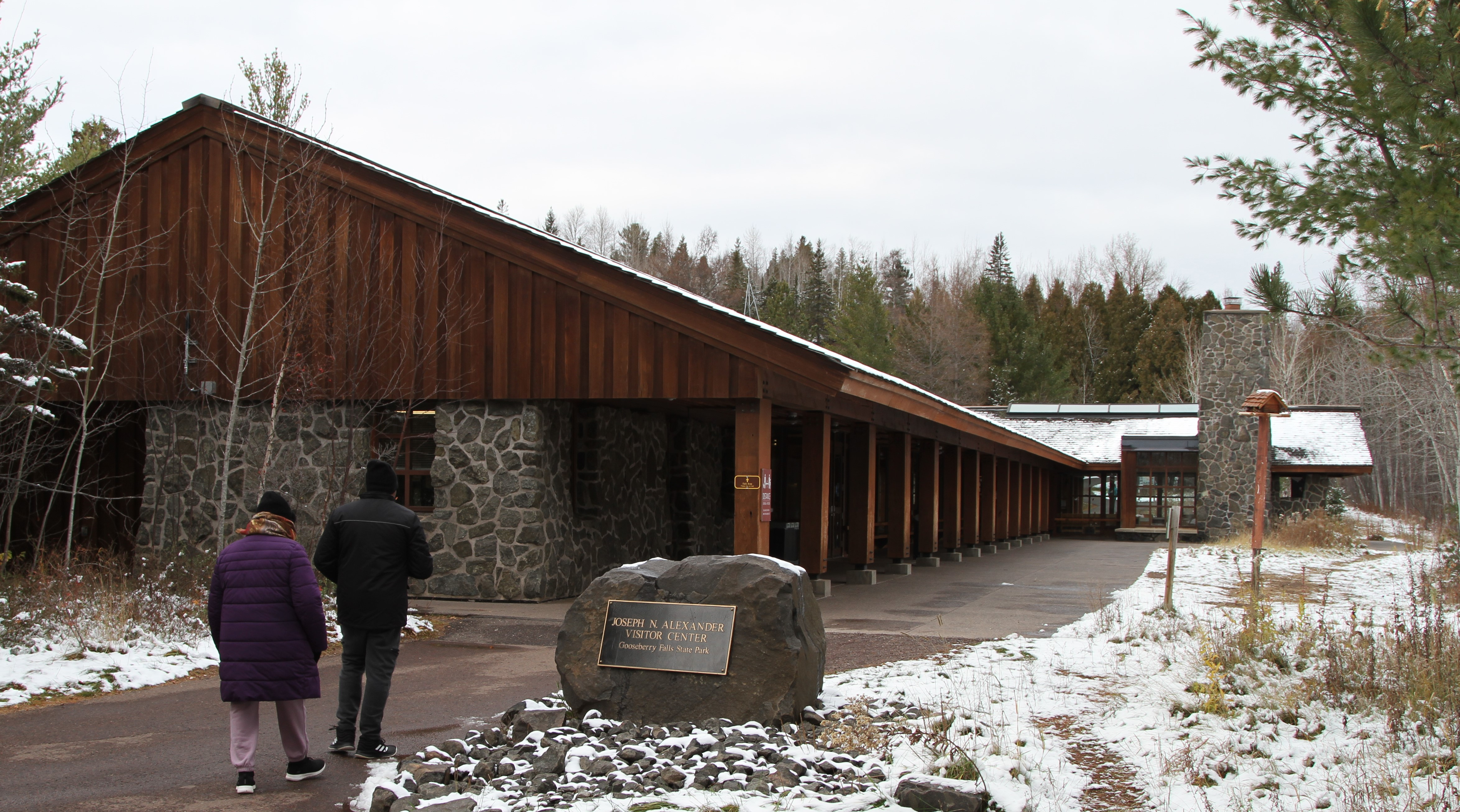

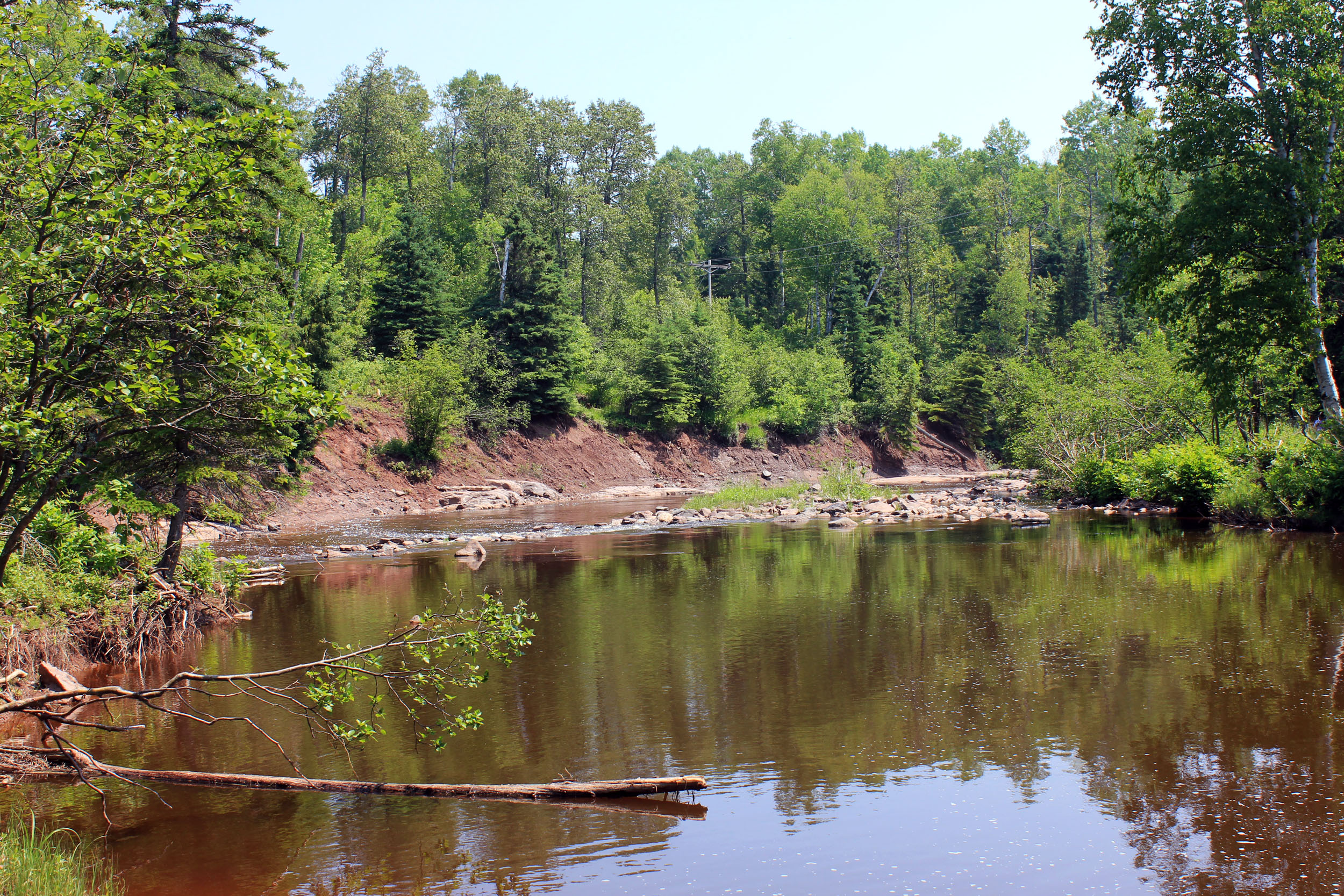

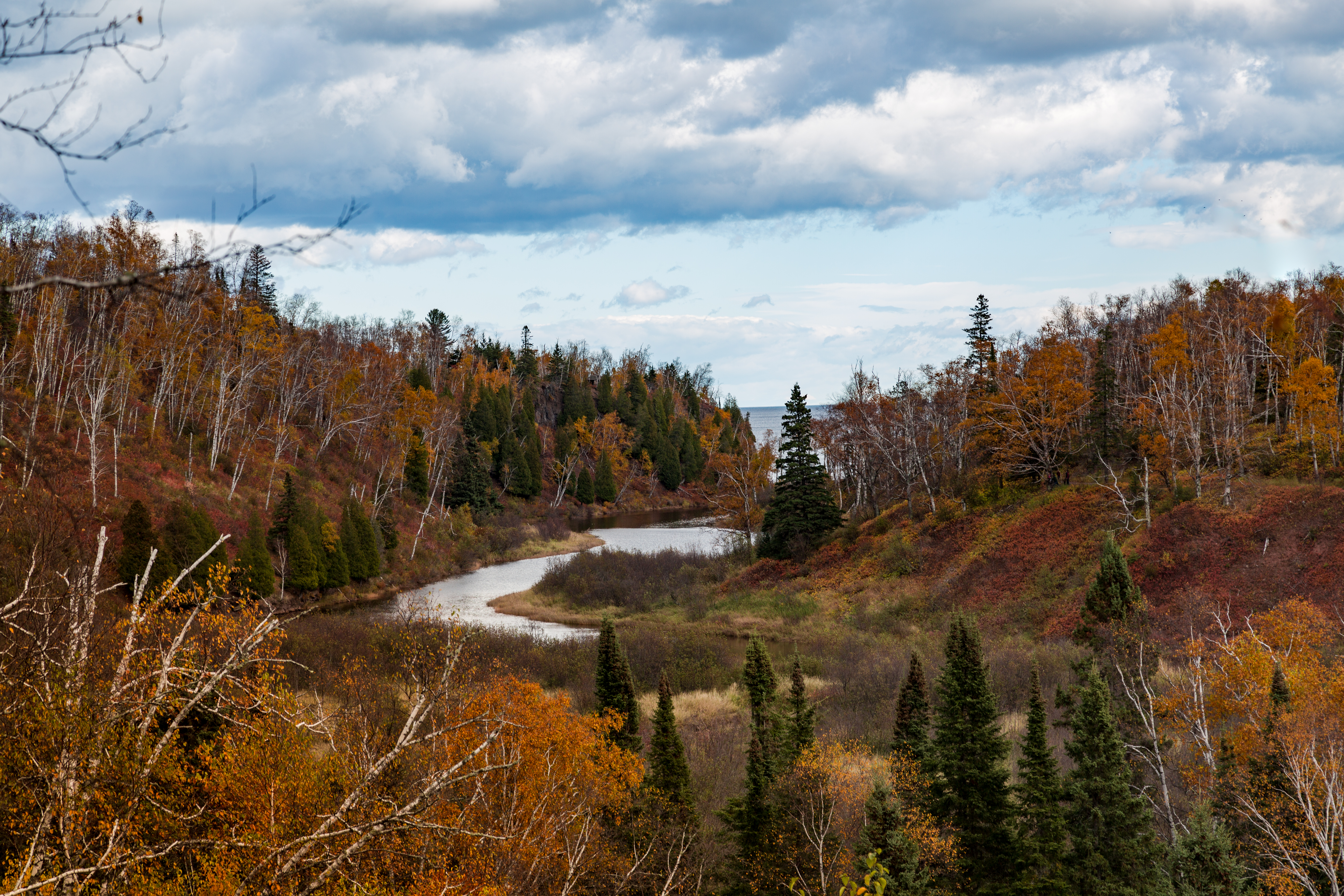

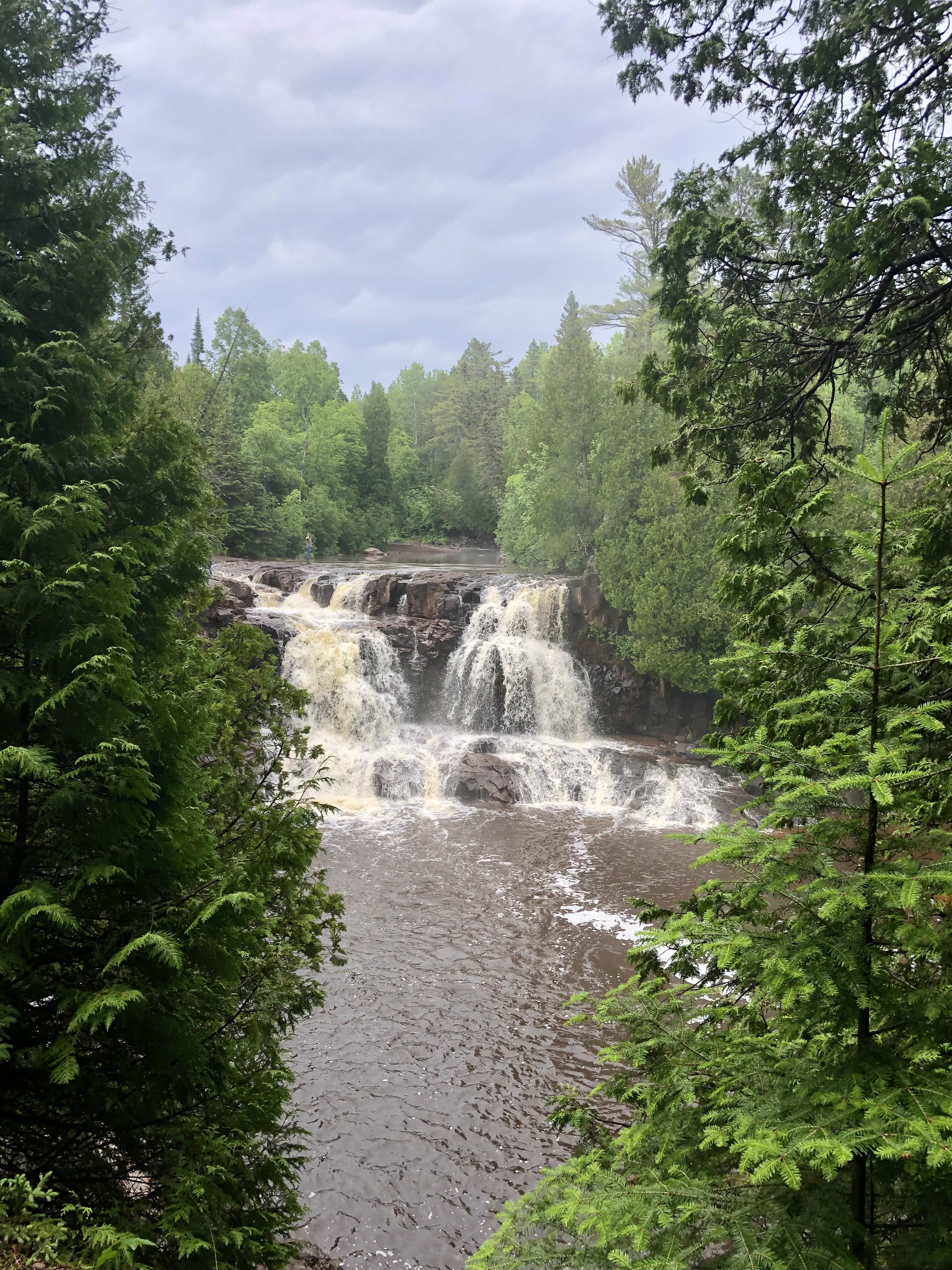
Gooseberry Falls in summer

== See also ==
- List of waterfalls
- Superior 100 Mile Trail Race
