= 2024 Stifel Loppet Cup =

International cross-country ski competition in Minneapolis

- 2023–24 FIS Cross-Country World Cup
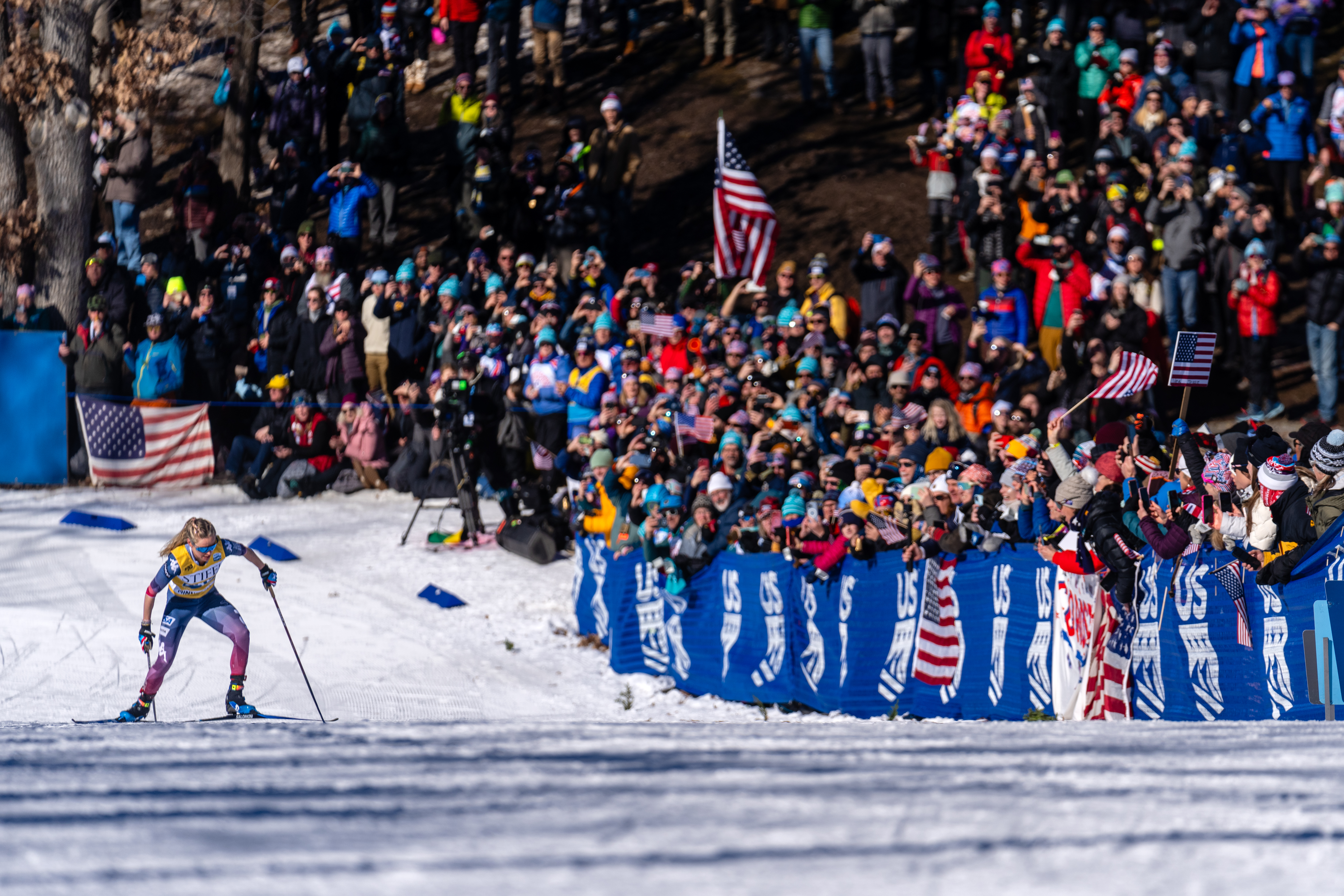
- Jessie Diggins of the United States in the women's 10 km final on February 18, 2024.

Tournament information
- Sport: Cross-country skiing
- Location: Minneapolis, Minnesota, U.S.
- Dates: February 17–18, 2024
- Administrator: FIS
- Host: Loppet Foundation
- Venue: Theodore Wirth Park
- Participants: More than 150 athletes from 21 nations
- Broadcast: Eurosport; NBC Sports
- Website: Loppet Cup

Tournament statistics
- Attendance: 40,000

Freestyle 1.5 km sprint
- Dates: February 17, 2024
- Champion: M - Johannes Høsflot Klæbo; F - Jonna Sundling

Freestyle 10 km
- Dates: February 18, 2024
- Champion: M - Gus Schumacher; F - Jonna Sundling

The 2024 Stifel Loppet Cup was an international cross-country skiing competition held February 17–18 at Theodore Wirth Park in Minneapolis. As one of the fifteen events in the 2023–24 FIS Cross-Country World Cup season, it featured top-ranked skiers from the global racing circuit. The event was the first World Cup cross-country ski competition held in the United States since 2001. More than 150 athletes from 21 countries competed in the races. About 40,000 spectators attended the two-day, festival-like event that was headlined by the women’s races.

== Development ==
The United States had last hosted a World Cup cross-country ski event in 2001 at Soldier Hollow, Utah, as a test run for the 2002 Winter Olympics in Salt Lake City. Jessie Diggins, a native of Afton, Minnesota, after winning a cross-country skiing gold medal alongside teammate Kikkan Randall at the 2018 Winter Olympics in Pyeongchang, lobbied for the United States to host a World Cup cross-country skiing event. Due to the efforts of Diggins and others, the Loppet Foundation, a non-profit organization based in Minneapolis, Minnesota, was given the opportunity to host an event at Theodore Wirth Park on March 17, 2020, but it was canceled five days prior to its start as a result of the COVID-19 pandemic.

The Loppet Foundation was given another host opportunity in the 2023–24 FIS Cross-Country World Cup season as part of a North American swing, with an event on the tour taking place the week prior in Canmore, Alberta, Canada. Race organizers in Minneapolis, however, had to contend with one of the warmest and driest winters on local record, which threatened to cancel the event. To mitigate the weather conditions, organizers created a 7-kilometre (4.3 mi) ski trail with a 0.6-metre (2.0 ft) base using snowmaking machines. About 17.78 centimetres (7.00 in) of natural snow fell two days before the races.

The event was broadcast by Eurosport in European countries and by NBC Sports in the United States.

== Results ==
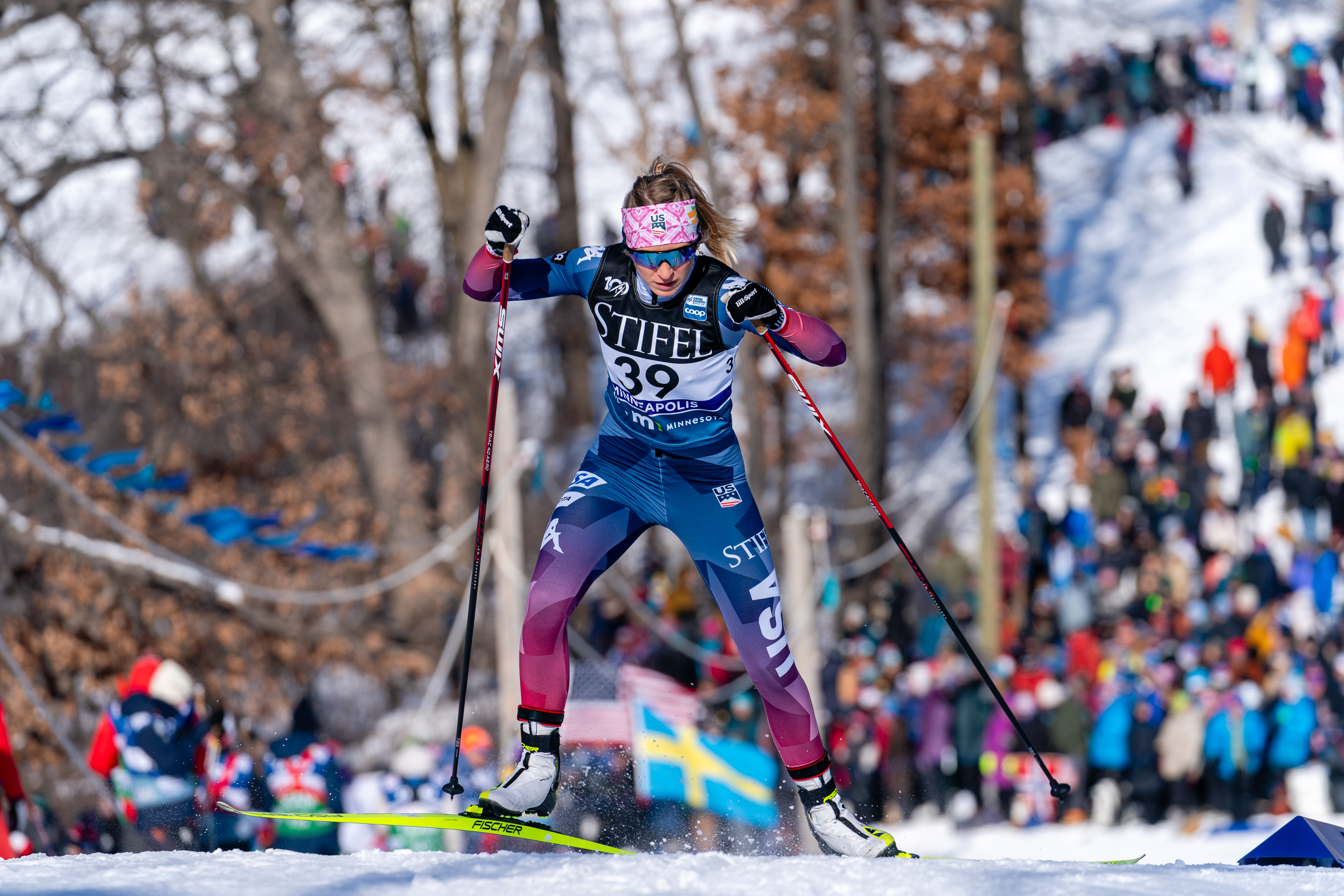
Erin Bianco in the women's sprint qualification.

Over two days, men and women athletes competed in separate sprint and 10 kilometer races using skate skiing (or freestyle) technique. In the 1.5 kilometer sprint finals on February 17, 2024, Johannes Høsflot Klæbo of Norway was the top male finisher and Jonna Sundling of Sweden was the top female finisher. In the 10 kilometer finals on February 18, 2024, Gus Schumacher of the United States was the top male finisher and Jonna Sundling of Sweden the top female finisher. Harald Østberg Amundsen of Norway and Jessie Diggins of the United States earned points from their race finishes to help maintain their leads in the overall 2023–2024 season standings for male and female skiers, respectively.

All results are sourced from the International Ski Federation (FIS).

=== Men ===
==== 1.5 km sprint final freestyle (mass start) ====
Rank	Bib	Athlete	Country	Finish time
1st place, gold medalist(s)	1	Johannes Høsflot Klæbo	Norway	2:54.24
2nd place, silver medalist(s)	2	Federico Pellegrino	Italy	2:54.51
3rd place, bronze medalist(s)	6	Håvard Solås Taugbøl	Norway	2:55.45
4	15	Janik Riebli	Switzerland	2:57.55
5	21	Even Northug	Norway	3:03.28
6	11	Simone Daprà	Italy	3:03.45

==== 10 km final freestyle (interval start) ====
Rank	Bib	Athlete	Country	Finish time
1st place, gold medalist(s)	35	Gus Schumacher	United States	20:52.7
2nd place, silver medalist(s)	56	Harald Østberg Amundsen	Norway	20:57.1
3rd place, bronze medalist(s)	70	Pål Golberg	Norway	20:58.5
4	64	Johannes Høsflot Klæbo	Norway	20:59.2
5	42	William Poromaa	Sweden	21:00.8
6	30	Thomas Maloney Westgård	Ireland	21:01.3

==== Overall World Cup standings after Minneapolis ====
Rank	Points	Athlete	Country
1	2073	Harald Østberg Amundsen	Norway
2	1743	Johannes Høsflot Klæbo	Norway
3	1663	Erik Valnes	Norway
4	1564	Pål Golberg	Norway
5	1078	Friedrich Moch	Germany

=== Women ===
==== 1.5 km sprint final freestyle (mass start) ====
Rank	Bib	Athlete	Country	Finish time
1st place, gold medalist(s)	1	Jonna Sundling	Sweden	3:06.40
2nd place, silver medalist(s)	3	Linn Svahn	Sweden	3:07.35
3rd place, bronze medalist(s)	5	Kristine Stavås Skistad	Norway	3:09.08
4	2	Jessie Diggins	United States	3:11.29
5	6	Victoria Carl	Germany	3:21.20
6	15	Emma Ribom	Sweden	3:53.87

==== 10 km final freestyle (interval start) ====
Rank	Bib	Athlete	Country	Finish time
1st place, gold medalist(s)	38	Jonna Sundling	Sweden	22:38.9
2nd place, silver medalist(s)	32	Frida Karlsson	Sweden	22:54.3
3rd place, bronze medalist(s)	58	Jessie Diggins	United States	23:10.7
4	50	Linn Svahn	Sweden	23:13.9
5	34	Victoria Carl	Germany	23:22.5
6	52	Kerttu Niskanen	Finland	23:26.1

==== Overall World Cup standings after Minneapolis ====
Rank	Points	Athlete	Country
1	2290	Jessie Diggins	United States
2	2033	Linn Svahn	Sweden
3	1831	Frida Karlsson	Sweden
4	1657	Victoria Carl	Germany
5	1602	Rosie Brennan	United States

== Achievements ==
Jonna Sundling of Sweden dominated the final rounds of the women’s competition by winning both the sprint and 10 kilometer finals.

Gus Schumacher, a 23-year old from Anchorage, Alaska, had a surprise victory in the men’s 10 kilometer final. He became the youngest American to win a World Cup cross-country skiing race, the first American man to win any World Cup race since Simi Hamilton in 2013, and the first American man to win a World Cup distance race since Bill Koch in 1983.

== See also ==
- Climate change
- FIS Cross-Country World Cup
- Minneapolis Park and Recreation Board
- U.S. Ski & Snowboard
