= Gooseberry River =

- Gooseberry River at Upper Falls

- Mouth of Gooseberry River
- Native name: Zhaaboominikaani-ziibi (Ojibwe)

Location
- Country: United States
- State: Minnesota
- County: Lake County

Physical characteristics
- Source
  - location: Legler Lake
  - coordinates: 47°17′47″N 91°37′17″W
  - elevation: 1670 ft
- Mouth
  - location: Split Rock Point, Lake Superior
  - coordinates: 47°08′34″N 91°27′25″W
  - elevation: 604 ft
- Length: 23 miles (37 km)
- Basin size: 85 square miles (220 km^{2})

Gooseberry River is a 23-mile stream in Lake County, Minnesota, USA, draining into Lake Superior. It is known for its waterfalls, near its mouth in Gooseberry Falls State Park. The Gooseberry, like many of its neighboring streams, has an irregular discharge highly dependent on runoff from rain and snow melt. The region around the river was heavily forested and much logging took place during the early 20th century. The forest has since regrown and the falls and mouth of the river are now a thriving tourist destination.

== Name ==
The English name for the Gooseberry River first appeared in 1823 on a map made by Major Stephen Harriman Long during his expedition of the Canada–US border region. There are two competing theories about the origin of the Gooseberry's name. The Ojibwe name for the river is zhaaboominikaani-ziibi, which translates to River Place of Gooseberries. Alternatively, the name has been taken as a translation of the name of the French explorer Groseilliers. The name Reviere de Groseilliers appeared on early French maps of the area as early as 1670, and Groseilliers visited the North Shore region in the 1660s. The puzzle of the true origin has not been solved conclusively, and the state park lists both as plausible explanations.

== Topography ==
Gooseberry River has no lake or reservoir serving as its headwaters, rising in a gully in T. 56 N. R. 10 W. at an elevation of 1700 feet. From here it falls 1100 feet over 23 miles until it enters Lake Superior in Silver Creek Township. The main branch of the Gooseberry River drains a watershed of 27.3 square miles, approximately one quarter wetlands and three quarters forest. The total area drained by the Gooseberry river, including all tributaries, is 85 square miles. Major tributaries include the Little Gooseberry River, Skunk Creek, and Mink Creek.

The most distinctive features of Gooseberry River are the Gooseberry Falls, three waterfalls in close succession near Highway 61 in Gooseberry Falls State Park. They begin .95 miles from the mouth of the river 120 feet above lake level, and end .75 miles from the mouth at 7 feet above lake level. Another fall is located between 1.8 and 1.85 miles from the mouth. The bed of the river near the falls is a basalt flow lying over an Amygdaloid flow. The Amygadloids erode faster than basalt, which then breaks off in large pieces, causing the high cliffs over which the river flows. Below the falls, the river cuts a large channel through mostly clay. To the northeast, a large basalt cliff rises 75 feet above lake level. To the southwest of the mouth is a lower cliff of only 10 feet, which was probably once attached to the high bluff before the river cut a channel between them. At the mouth, the flow of the river meets the opposing force of storms on the lake, kicking up a bar of red pebbles and chalcedony agates.

Due to the lack of a headwater, the Gooseberry's flow comes nearly entirely from runoff. Accordingly, the flow is heaviest during the spring snow melt, and comparatively the river may run nearly dry during the summer.

== Ecology ==
Gooseberry River is populated by brook, brown, and rainbow trout in the stretches above the barrier falls, and sees runs of steelhead in April and May. It is situated in a mixed evergreen, aspen, and birch forest with colonies of Arctic–alpine plants which enjoy Lake Superior's moderating effect on the local climate.

== Human use ==
Gooseberry River appears on French maps as the Reviere des Groseilliers as early as the 1670s. The region remained largely undeveloped until the 1870s, when commercial fishers moved into the north shore region. Loggers followed in the 1890s.

In July 1899, Colonel John H. Knight and former Senator of Wisconsin William Freeman Vilas, owners of the Superior Lumber Company, acquired for $1,000,000 land around the Gooseberry River estimated to contain four hundred million feet of standing pine. Logs felled from the forests around the Gooseberry were rafted to Knight and Vilas's lumber mills in Ashland, Wisconsin. One year later, these lands were acquired, along with Knight and Vilas's Ashland mill, by Thomas Nestor of the Nestor Logging Company for $1,250,000. The Nestor Logging Company set up its headquarters at the mouth of the Gooseberry, and built a logging railroad running inland to harvest the thick pine stands in the region. The railway was removed by 1908, but when the Virginia & Rainy Lake Company began logging further inland, the Nestor grade was once again used to build a spur line to connect the project with the Duluth & Northern Minnesota Railway.

In the upper reaches of the watershed of the Gooseberry and its tributaries, communities began to grow on the Alger Line. One, London, was located where the Alger Line passed over the headwaters of the tributary Dago Creek at 47.203°N 91.57°W. A sleigh road connecting Two Harbors and Beaver Bay ran alongside the railway through the upper Gooseberry watershed. Logging and fire exhausted the pine by the 1920s, and loggers moved out of the region. The Alger Line ceased to operate in 1923 and London became a ghost town. A few houses were reported standing in the 1950s, but more modern reports claim only foundations remain. The site is now the subject of ghost stories.

A bridge was built over the Gooseberry near the falls in 1922 to service Minnesota State Highway 61, the only highway to Canada along the North Shore. The original bridge, Bridge no. 3585, was built by the Illinois Steel Bridge Company. It was expanded to include a third arch so as to widen the road in 1937. In 1990 a decision was made to replace the deteriorating bridge with another arch bridge evocative of the original. This replacement bridge, #38010, was inspected after the collapse of the 35W Mississippi River bridge in 2007 due to design similarities. No critical deficiencies were found. The original truss bridge had an arch of 150 feet, and the modern bridge has an arch of 154 feet.

The region around the falls was placed under protection by the legislature in 1933, and in 1934 the Civilian Conservation Corps began developing this land into what would become Gooseberry Falls State Park, which opened in 1937. Emergency CCC Camp #1720 operated from May to October 1934, and CCC Camp #2710 operated from July 1934 to May 1941, building more than 80 structures in the park's distinctive style. The park now receives over six hundred thousand visits annually.

== See also ==
- List of rivers of Minnesota
