= Superior 100 Mile Trail Race =

Ultramarathon in Minnesota, USA

Coordinates: 47.658767423895746°N 90.71314508783814°W

- Date: first Friday and Saturday in September
- Location: Gooseberry Falls State Park to Lutsen Mountains in Minnesota
- Event type: Ultramarathon
- Distance: 103.3 miles (166.2 km)
- Established: 1991 (35 years ago)
- Course records: Men's: 18:56:02 (2018); Neal Collick; Women's: 21:54:10 (2023); Gretchen Metsa
- Website: Superior 100 Mile Trail Race

The Superior 100 Mile Trail Race is an annual ultramarathon in Minnesota. The race starts at Gooseberry Falls State Park and runs along the Superior Hiking Trail until it finishes at Caribou Highlands Lodge on Lutsen Mountains. It is run on the first Friday and Saturday in September.

Harry Sloan founded the race in 1991, who served as race director from 1991 until 1997. The current race director is John Storkamp, and the race is organized by RockSteady Running.

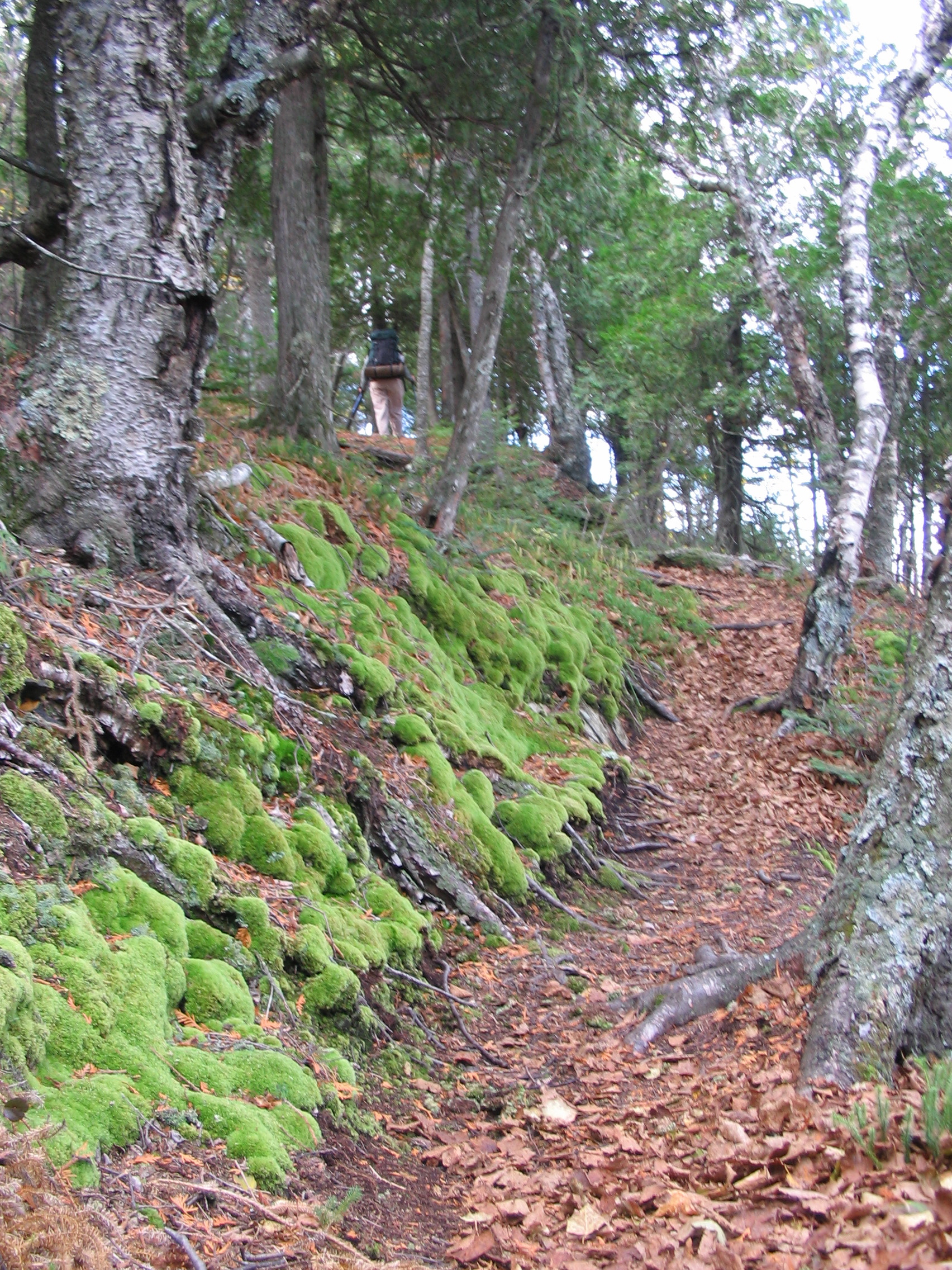
Representative view of the Superior Hiking Trail, along which the Superior 100 is run.

Having started in 1991, the Superior 100 Mile Trail Race is the ninth oldest 100 mile trail race in the United States. It has a reputation for being among the most difficult races of its kind, owing to grueling climbs and unpredictable weather conditions. The race has 21,000 feet (6,400 m) of vertical climbs and in 2013 the average finish time was 34 hours. The Superior 100 has a time limit of 38 hours.

== History and Records ==
The course records after the 2023 race are held by Neal Collick (18:56:02) for men and Gretchen Metsa (21:54:10) for women.

The current course has been run since 2006, which was originally measured twice via a surveying wheel by Donald Clark and Bonnie Riley. The original course ran from the junior high school in Silver Bay, Minnesota to the Cook County football field in Grand Marais, Minnesota on the Superior Hiking Trail. Harry Sloan, race director from 1991 to 1997 along with Tami Tanski-Sherman, believes the current course is more challenging than the original.

Notable history

- In 2022, Sophie Tibbetts became the first known member of the Fond du Lac Band of Lake Superior Chippewa to have completed the Superior 100.
- In 2017, the Split Rock River Bridge was out and runners had to cross Split Rock River on foot. Beavers also flooded part of the course with knee-high water.
- As of 2016, Eugene Curnow was the first person to have completed the Superior 100 ten times and remains one of only three people to have done so.
- Courtney Dauwalter ran the Superior 100 in 2013 and finished second.

Women's Winners

Year	Winner	Time	Age	Country
2024	Cheryl Matson	27:41:54	41	United States
2023	Gretchen Metsa	21:54:10	40	United States
2022	Gretchen Metsa	24:06:19	39	United States
2021	Katie Kubont	27:14:10	37	United States
2020	Cancelled due to the COVID-19 pandemic			
2019	Kelly Teeselink	25:23:19	32	United States
2018	Mallory Richard	22:36:39	33	Canada
2017	Gretchen Metsa	25:23:03	34	United States
2016	Mallory Richard	23:51:01	31	Canada
2015	Mallory Richard	25:36:47	30	Canada
2014	Mallory Richard	27:32:27	29	Canada
2013	April Anselmo	26:03:14	28	United States
2012	Kristina Folcik	24:49:06	34	United States
2011	Sheryl Wheeler	27:19:17	48	United States
2010	Sheryl Wheeler	27:42:03	47	United States
2009	Eva Pastalkova	30:59:32	33	United States
2008	Helen Lavin	26:49:22	unknown	United StatesIreland
2007	Susan Donnelly	32:35:58	44	United States
2006	Kerry Owens	29:37:26	43	United States
2005	Event not held			
2004	Jenny Hoffman	28:31:51	unknown	unknown
2003	Susan Donnelly	32:03:38	40	United States
2002	Diana Finkel	26:39:24	30	United States
2001	Karen Libsch	28:52:16	unknown	United States
2000	Susan Donnelly	28:43:30	37	United States
1999	Sue Johnston	23:52:40	33	United States
1998	No female finishers			
1997	Mary Bystedt	26:02:53	44	United States
1996	Mary Bystedt	28:07:49	43	United States
1995	Peggy Stafford	28:39:56	47	United States
1994	Mary Bystedt	24:17:59	41	United States
1993	Mary Bystedt	25:30:28	40	United States
1992	Susan Gimbel	26:45:02	45	United States
1991	Susan Gimbel	26:49:49	44	United States

Men's Winners

Year	Winner	Time	Age	Country
2024	Scott Wopata	20:54:03	40	United States
2023	Kyle Moss	19:40:16	32	United States
2022	Jake Hegge	20:45:02	31	United States
2021	Thomas Carr	21:09:32	29	United States
2020	Cancelled due to the COVID-19 pandemic			
2019	Mick Jurynec	20:15:55	42	United States
2018	Neal Collick	18:56:02	38	United States
2017	Neal Collick	19:31:40	37	United States
2016	Frank Pipp	20:23:15	39	United States
2015	Jake Hegge	19:30:37	24	United States
2014	Adam Schwartz-Lowe	21:58:32	41	United States
2013	John Horns	23:21:36	51	United States
2012	Steven Moore	21:02:41	45	United States
2011	John Horns	24:13:53	49	United States
2010	Brian Peterson	22:35:28	26	United States
2009	Angus Repper	26:31:47	37	United States
2008	Chris Gardner	21:57:53	unknown	United States
2007	Wynn Davis	23:17:26	26	United States
2006	Sean Andrish	21:42:11	36	United States
2005	Event not held			
2004	Christopher Hanson	28:04:56	33	United States
2003	Doug Hansel	26:42:43	43	United States
2002	Steve Schuder	24:05:11	38	United States
2001	Andy Holak	23:27:06	unknown	United States
2000	Ian Torrence	18:59:58	27	United States
1999	Jeff Simpkins	20:40:05	37	unknown
1998	Frederick Brooks	22:55:10	45	unknown
1997	Mark Marcelli	19:50:45	38	United States
1996	Larry Ochsendorf	20:40:24	51	United States
1995	David Atlas	20:30:12	unknown	United States
1994	David Wrolstad	21:15:29	35	United States
1993	Joe Franko	20:46:03	unknown	unknown
1992	Eric Clifton	17:21:42	unknown	unknown
1991	Bob Stavig	23:08:57	42	United States
