= Scandinavian Cup =

Series of cross-country skiing event in Northern Europe

- Genre: Cross-country skiing
- Date: Northern wintertime season
- Begins: November
- Ends: March
- Frequency: annual
- Locations: Scandinavia: Norway; Sweden; Other: Estonia; Finland; Latvia
- Inaugurated: 2004
- Organiser: International Ski Federation
- 2019–20 Scandinavian Cup

The Scandinavian Cup is a series of cross-country skiing events arranged by the International Ski Federation (FIS). The Cup is one of the nine FIS Cross-Country Continental Cups, a series of second-level cross-country skiing competitions ranked below the Cross-Country World Cup. The Scandinavian Cup is open for competitors from all nations, but eight main countries are associated to the Scandinavian Cup; Denmark, Norway, Sweden, Finland, Iceland, Latvia, Lithuania and Estonia.

The Scandinavian Cup has been held annually since the 2004–05 season.

== World Cup qualification ==
In the end of certain periods, the overall leaders for both genders receive a place in the World Cup in the following period. The overall winners of the season receive a place in the World Cup in the beginning of the following season.

== Overall winners ==
=== Men ===
Season	Winner	Second	Third
2004–05	(Norway) John Anders Gaustad	(Norway) Stig Rune Kveen	(Norway) Remi Andersen
2005–06	(Norway) Petter Northug	(Norway) Øystein Pettersen	(Sweden) Fredrik Persson
2006–07	(Norway) Øystein Pettersen	(Norway) Krister Trondsen	(Norway) John Kristian Dahl
2007–08	(Norway) Hans Petter Lykkja	(Sweden) Fredrik Östberg	(Norway) John Anders Gaustad
2008–09	(Norway) Roger Aa Djupvik	(Norway) Geir Ludvig Aasen Ouren	(Sweden) Jesper Modin
2009–10	(Norway) Kristian Tettli Rennemo	(Norway) Hans Petter Lykkja	(Norway) Sjur Røthe
2010–11	(Norway) Finn Hågen Krogh	(Norway) Hans Petter Lykkja	(Norway) Øyvind Gløersen
2011–12	(Norway) John Kristian Dahl	(Norway) Kristian Tettli Rennemo	(Sweden) Fredrik Karlsson
2012–13	(Norway) Tomas Northug	(Norway) Snorri Einarsson	(Norway) Hans Christer Holund
2013–14	(Norway) Simen Østensen	(Norway) Daniel Myrmæl Helgestad	(Norway) Emil Iversen
2014–15	(Norway) Hans Christer Holund	(Norway) Mathias Rundgreen	(Norway) Sindre Bjørnestad Skar
2015–16	(Norway) Martin Løwstrøm Nyenget (1)	(Norway) Johan Hoel	(Norway) Daniel Myrmæl Helgestad
2016–17	(Norway) Håvard Solås Taugbøl	(Norway) Mathias Rundgreen	(Norway) Daniel Stock
2017–18	(Norway) Martin Løwstrøm Nyenget (2)	(Norway) Eirik Sverdrup Augdal	(Norway) Daniel Stock
2018–19	(Norway) Mattis Stenshagen (1)	(Norway) Daniel Stock	(Norway) Harald Østberg Amundsen
2019–20	(Norway) Gjøran Tefre	(Norway) Johan Hoel	(Norway) Harald Østberg Amundsen (Norway) Jørgen Sæternes Ulvang
2020–21	Not held due to the coronavirus pandemic		
2021–22	(Norway) Mattis Stenshagen (2)	(Norway) Magne Haga	(Norway) Ole Jørgen Bruvoll

=== Women ===
Season	Winner	Second	Third
2004–05	(Norway) Ine Wigernæs	(Norway) Ann Eli Tafjord	(Finland) Marjo Korander
2005–06	(Finland) Katja Ruotsalainen Hiipakka	(Finland) Annmari Viljamaa	(Finland) Pirjo Porvari
2006–07	(Norway) Astrid Uhrenholdt Jacobsen	(Finland) Kati Venäläinen-Sundqvist	(Sweden) Susanne Nyström
2007–08	(Norway) Ingri Aunet Tyldum	(Sweden) Sara Svendsen	(Norway) Karianne Bjellånes
2008–09	(Norway) Sara Svendsen	(Norway) Kristin Mürer Stemland	(Norway) Agnetha Åsheim
2009–10	(Norway) Ingvild Flugstad Østberg	(Norway) Marte Elden	(Sweden) Eva Svensson
2010–11	(Norway) Heidi Weng	(Norway) Britt Ingunn Nydal	(Norway) Astrid Øyre Slind
2011–12	(Norway) Martine Ek Hagen	(Norway) Maria Nysted Grønvoll	(Norway) Britt Ingunn Nydal
2012–13	(Norway) Kari Vikhagen Gjeitnes	(Norway) Tuva Toftdahl Staver	(Norway) Britt Ingunn Nydal
2013–14	(Norway) Kathrine Harsem (1)	(Norway) Martine Ek Hagen	(Norway) Marthe Kristoffersen
2014–15	(Norway) Kathrine Harsem (2)	(Norway) Silje Øyre Slind	(Norway) Silje Theodorsen
2015–16	(Norway) Barbro Kvåle	(Sweden) Sofia Henriksson	(Sweden) Jonna Sundling
2016–17	(Sweden) Anna Dyvik	(Norway) Tiril Udnes Weng	(Norway) Lotta Udnes Weng
2017–18	(Norway) Tiril Udnes Weng	(Norway) Lotta Udnes Weng	(Sweden) Jonna Sundling
2018–19	(Norway) Anne Kjersti Kalvå	(Sweden) Johanna Hagström	(Sweden) Moa Lundgren
2019–20	(Norway) Julie Myhre	(Sweden) Linn Sömskar	(Sweden) Maria Nordström
2020–21	Not held due to the coronavirus pandemic		
2021–22	(Norway) Marte Skånes	(Norway) Karoline Simpson-Larsen	(Norway) Hedda Østberg Amundsen
