= 2018–19 Scandinavian Cup =

Discipline	Men	Women
Overall	(Norway) Mattis Stenshagen	(Norway) Anne Kjersti Kalvå

Stage events
Mini-tour	(Norway) Martin Løwstrøm Nyenget	(Sweden) Moa Lundgren

Competition
Locations	3 venues	3 venues
Individual	8 events	8 events
Cancelled	1 event	1 event

The 2018–19 Scandinavian Cup was a season of the Scandinavian Cup, a Continental Cup season in cross-country skiing for men and women. The season began on 14 December 2018 in Östersund, Sweden and concluded with a stage event 1–3 March 2019 in Madona, Latvia.

== Calendar ==
=== Men ===
Key: C – Classic / F – Freestyle
Period	Race	Date	Place	Discipline	Winner	Second	Third	Ref.
I	1	14 December 2018	(Sweden) Östersund	Sprint C	(Norway) Pål Trøan Aune	(Norway) Torgeir Sulen Hovland	(Norway) Erik Valnes	
I		15 December 2018	(Sweden) Östersund	15 km C	Cancelled			
I	2	16 December 2018	(Sweden) Östersund	15 km F	(Sweden) Daniel Rickardsson	(Norway) Daniel Stock	(Norway) Harald Østberg Amundsen	
II	3	4 January 2019	(Finland) Vuokatti	Sprint F	(Norway) Erik Valnes	(Norway) Sondre Turvoll Fossli	(Norway) Håvard Solås Taugbøl	
II	4	5 January 2019	(Finland) Vuokatti	15 km C	(Finland) Iivo Niskanen	(Norway) Mattis Stenshagen	(Russia) Alexey Chervotkin	
II	5	6 January 2019	(Finland) Vuokatti	30 km F Mass Start	(Norway) Mattis Stenshagen	(Norway) Jan Thomas Jenssen	(Russia) Alexey Chervotkin	
III	6	1 March 2019	(Latvia) Madona	Sprint F	(Norway) Gjøran Tefre	(Norway) Mattis Stenshagen	(Norway) Erik Valnes	
III	7	2 March 2019	(Latvia) Madona	10 km C	(Norway) Daniel Stock	(Norway) Mattis Stenshagen	(Norway) Martin Løwstrøm Nyenget	
III	8	3 March 2019	(Latvia) Madona	15 km F Pursuit	(Norway) Jørgen Sæternes Ulvang	(Norway) Johan Hoel	(Norway) Ole Jørgen Bruvoll	
III	Mini-tour Overall (1–3 March 2019)				(Norway) Martin Løwstrøm Nyenget	(Norway) Mattis Stenshagen	(Norway) Gjøran Tefre	

=== Women ===
Key: C – Classic / F – Freestyle
Period	Race	Date	Place	Discipline	Winner	Second	Third	Ref.
I	1	14 December 2018	(Sweden) Östersund	Sprint C	(Norway) Anna Svendsen	(Norway) Anne Kjersti Kalvå	(Sweden) Anna Dyvik	
I		15 December 2018	(Sweden) Östersund	10 km C	Cancelled			
I	2	16 December 2018	(Sweden) Östersund	10 km F	(Norway) Astrid Øyre Slind	(Sweden) Linn Sömskar	(Sweden) Moa Molander Kristiansen	
II	3	4 January 2019	(Finland) Vuokatti	Sprint F	(Sweden) Johanna Hagström	(Sweden) Moa Lundgren	(Norway) Anne Kjersti Kalvå	
II	4	5 January 2019	(Finland) Vuokatti	10 km C	(Sweden) Frida Karlsson	(Norway) Anne Kjersti Kalvå	(Russia) Yana Kirpichenko	
II	5	6 January 2019	(Finland) Vuokatti	20 km F Mass Start	(Sweden) Frida Karlsson	(Norway) Anne Kjersti Kalvå	(Finland) Eveliina Piippo	
III	6	1 March 2019	(Latvia) Madona	Sprint F	(Sweden) Moa Lundgren	(Sweden) Linn Svahn	(Sweden) Emma Ribom	
III	7	2 March 2019	(Latvia) Madona	5 km C	(Sweden) Johanna Hagström	(Sweden) Lisa Vinsa	(Sweden) Elina Rönnlund	
III	8	3 March 2019	(Latvia) Madona	10 km F Pursuit	(Norway) Anne Kjersti Kalvå	(Sweden) Moa Lundgren	(Sweden) Lisa Vinsa	
III	Mini-tour Overall (1–3 March 2019)				(Sweden) Moa Lundgren	(Sweden) Emma Ribom	(Sweden) Johanna Hagström	

== Overall standings ==
=== Men's overall standings ===
Rank		Points
1	(Norway) Mattis Stenshagen	399
2	(Norway) Daniel Stock	284
3	(Norway) Harald Østberg Amundsen	259
4	(Norway) Martin Løwstrøm Nyenget	253
5	(Norway) Erik Valnes	248
6	(Norway) Gjøran Tefre	241
7	(Norway) Johan Hoel	228
8	(Norway) Erland Kvisle	210
9	(Norway) Gaute Kvåle	203
10	(Norway) Pål Trøan Aune	184

=== Women's overall standings ===
Rank		Points
1	(Norway) Anne Kjersti Kalvå	407
2	(Sweden) Johanna Hagström	335
3	(Sweden) Moa Lundgren	314
4	(Sweden) Emma Ribom	240
5	(Norway) Julie Myhre	221
6	(Sweden) Lisa Vinsa	209
	(Sweden) Elina Rönnlund	209
8	(Sweden) Moa Olsson	200
9	(Norway) Tiril Liverød Knudsen	195
10	(Sweden) Frida Karlsson	194
