= 2015–16 Scandinavian Cup =

Discipline	Men	Women
Overall	(Norway) Martin Løwstrøm Nyenget	(Norway) Barbro Kvåle

Stage events
Mini-tour	(Norway) Pål Golberg	(Sweden) Jonna Sundling

Competition
Locations	3 venues	3 venues
Individual	9 events	9 events

The 2015–16 Scandinavian Cup was a season of the Scandinavian Cup, a Continental Cup season in cross-country skiing for men and women. The season began on 11 December 2015 in Vuokatti, Finland and concluded with a stage event 11–13 March 2016 in Otepää, Estonia.

== Calendar ==
=== Men ===
Key: C – Classic / F – Freestyle
Period	Race	Date	Place	Discipline	Winner	Second	Third	Ref.
I	1	11 December 2015	(Finland) Vuokatti	15 km C	(Norway) Emil Iversen	(Norway) Mathias Rundgreen	(Norway) Martin Løwstrøm Nyenget	
I	2	12 December 2015	(Finland) Vuokatti	Sprint F	(Sweden) Oskar Svensson	(Sweden) Karl-Johan Westberg	(Norway) Emil Iversen	
I	3	13 December 2015	(Finland) Vuokatti	15 km F	(Norway) Martin Løwstrøm Nyenget	(Norway) Daniel Myrmæl Helgestad	(Norway) Mathias Rundgreen	
II	4	8 January 2016	(Sweden) Östersund	15 km F	(Norway) Per Kristian Nygård	(Norway) Mathias Rundgreen	(Norway) Simen Hegstad Krüger	
II	5	9 January 2016	(Sweden) Östersund	(Note: As the finals were cancelled, the qualification results counted.) Sprint C	(Norway) Even Northug	(Norway) Andreas Myran Steen	(Finland) Joni Mäki	
II	6	10 January 2016	(Sweden) Östersund	15 km C Mass Start	(Norway) Mikael Gunnulfsen	(Norway) Sindre Sætre Hammerlund	(Norway) Daniel Myrmæl Helgestad	
III	7	11 March 2016	(Estonia) Otepää	Sprint F	(Norway) Håvard Solås Taugbøl	(Norway) Pål Trøan Aune	(Norway) Sindre Odberg Palm	
III	8	12 March 2016	(Estonia) Otepää	10 km C	(Norway) Daniel Stock	(Norway) Magnus Stensås	(Norway) Mathias Rundgreen	
III	9	13 March 2016	(Estonia) Otepää	15 km F Pursuit	(Norway) Espen Udjus Frorud	(Norway) Johan Hoel	(Norway) Daniel Myrmæl Helgestad	
III	Mini-tour Overall (11–13 March 2016)				(Norway) Pål Golberg	(Norway) Daniel Stock	(Norway) Martin Løwstrøm Nyenget	

=== Women ===
Key: C – Classic / F – Freestyle
Period	Race	Date	Place	Discipline	Winner	Second	Third	Ref.
I	1	11 December 2015	(Finland) Vuokatti	10 km C	(Sweden) Sofia Henriksson	(Norway) Barbro Kvåle	(Norway) Mari Eide	
I	2	12 December 2015	(Finland) Vuokatti	Sprint F	(Sweden) Maja Dahlqvist	(Norway) Anne Kjersti Kalvå	(Norway) Silje Øyre Slind	
I	3	13 December 2015	(Finland) Vuokatti	10 km F	(Norway) Maria Strøm Nakstad	(Sweden) Marika Sundin	(Sweden) Ebba Andersson	
II	4	8 January 2016	(Sweden) Östersund	10 km F	(Norway) Maria Strøm Nakstad	(Sweden) Ebba Andersson	(Norway) Silje Øyre Slind	
II	5	9 January 2016	(Sweden) Östersund	Sprint C	(Norway) Kari Vikhagen Gjeitnes	(Norway) Anna Svendsen	(Sweden) Linn Sömskar	
II	6	10 January 2016	(Sweden) Östersund	10 km C Mass Start	(Sweden) Sofia Henriksson	(Sweden) Ebba Andersson	(Norway) Kathrine Harsem	
III	7	11 March 2016	(Estonia) Otepää	Sprint F	(Norway) Mari Eide	(Sweden) Jonna Sundling	(Sweden) Linn Sömskar	
III	8	12 March 2016	(Estonia) Otepää	5 km C	(Norway) Kari Vikhagen Gjeitnes	(Norway) Anna Svendsen	(Norway) Mari Eide	
III	9	13 March 2016	(Estonia) Otepää	10 km F Pursuit	(Norway) Barbro Kvåle	(Norway) Marthe Bjørnsgaard	(Sweden) Evelina Settlin	
III	Mini-tour Overall (11–13 March 2016)				(Sweden) Jonna Sundling	(Norway) Barbro Kvåle	(Norway) Marthe Bjørnsgaard	

== Overall standings ==
=== Men's overall standings ===
Rank		Points
1	(Norway) Martin Løwstrøm Nyenget	501
2	(Norway) Johan Hoel	338
3	(Norway) Daniel Myrmæl Helgestad	310
4	(Norway) Per Kristian Nygård	299
5	(Norway) Pål Golberg	294
6	(Norway) Daniel Stock	278
7	(Norway) Andreas Myran Steen	243
	(Norway) Mathias Rundgreen	243
9	(Norway) Mikael Gunnulfsen	225
10	(Norway) Simen Hegstad Krüger	221

=== Women's overall standings ===
Rank		Points
1	(Norway) Barbro Kvåle	503
2	(Sweden) Sofia Henriksson	353
3	(Sweden) Jonna Sundling	349
4	(Norway) Mari Eide	340
5	(Norway) Marthe Bjørnsgaard	310
	(Norway) Silje Øyre Slind	310
7	(Norway) Anne Kjersti Kalvå	294
8	(Norway) Kari Vikhagen Gjeitnes	293
9	(Sweden) Linn Sömskar	282
10	(Norway) Maria Strøm Nakstad	281
