= 2017–18 Scandinavian Cup =

Discipline	Men	Women
Overall	(Norway) Mattis Stenshagen	(Norway) Tiril Udnes Weng

Stage events
Mini-tour	(Norway) Martin Løwstrøm Nyenget	(Norway) Tiril Udnes Weng

Competition
Locations	3 venues	3 venues
Individual	9 events	9 events

The 2017–18 Scandinavian Cup was a season of the Scandinavian Cup, a Continental Cup season in cross-country skiing for men and women. The season began on 15 December 2017 in Vuokatti, Finland and concluded with a stage event 23–25 February 2018 in Trondheim, Norway.

== Calendar ==
=== Men ===
Key: C – Classic / F – Freestyle
Period	Race	Date	Place	Discipline	Winner	Second	Third	Ref.
I	1	15 December 2017	(Finland) Vuokatti	15 km F	(Norway) Daniel Stock	(Norway) Sindre Bjørnestad Skar	(Norway) Jan Thomas Jenssen	
I	2	16 December 2017	(Finland) Vuokatti	Sprint F	(Norway) Sindre Bjørnestad Skar	(Norway) Jan Thomas Jenssen	(Sweden) Karl-Johan Westberg	
I	3	17 December 2017	(Finland) Vuokatti	15 km C	(Finland) Ristomatti Hakola	(Norway) Martin Løwstrøm Nyenget	(Norway) Chris André Jespersen	
II	4	5 January 2018	(Sweden) Piteå	Sprint C	(Norway) Eirik Brandsdal	(Norway) Mattis Stenshagen	(Sweden) Teodor Peterson	
II	5	6 January 2018	(Sweden) Piteå	15 km F	(Norway) Eirik Sverdrup Augdal	(Norway) Simen Andreas Sveen	(Norway) Daniel Stock	
II	6	7 January 2018	(Sweden) Piteå	30 km C Mass Start	(Norway) Mattis Stenshagen	(Norway) Martin Løwstrøm Nyenget	(Norway) Johan Hoel	
III	7	23 February 2018	(Norway) Trondheim	Sprint F	(Norway) Sindre Bjørnestad Skar	(Norway) Erik Valnes	(Norway) Jan Thomas Jenssen	
III	8	24 February 2018	(Norway) Trondheim	10 km C	(Norway) Pål Golberg	(Norway) Eirik Brandsdal	(Norway) Johan Hoel	
III	9	25 February 2018	(Norway) Trondheim	15 km F Pursuit	(Norway) Eirik Sverdrup Augdal	(Norway) Magne Haga	(Norway) Per Kristian Nygård	
III	Mini-tour Overall (23–25 February 2018)				(Norway) Martin Løwstrøm Nyenget	(Norway) Mattis Stenshagen	(Norway) Gjøran Tefre	

=== Women ===
Key: C – Classic / F – Freestyle
Period	Race	Date	Place	Discipline	Winner	Second	Third	Ref.
I	1	15 December 2017	(Finland) Vuokatti	10 km F	(Norway) Tiril Udnes Weng	(Norway) Lovise Heimdal	(Norway) Silje Øyre Slind	
I	2	16 December 2017	(Finland) Vuokatti	Sprint F	(Norway) Tiril Udnes Weng	(Norway) Silje Øyre Slind	(Norway) Amalie Håkonsen Ous	
I	3	17 December 2017	(Finland) Vuokatti	10 km C	(Finland) Johanna Matintalo	(Norway) Anna Svendsen	(Finland) Katri Lylynperä	
II	4	5 January 2018	(Sweden) Piteå	Sprint C	(Norway) Lotta Udnes Weng	(Sweden) Jonna Sundling	(Sweden) Charlotte Kalla	
II	5	6 January 2018	(Sweden) Piteå	10 km F	(Sweden) Charlotte Kalla	(Norway) Kari Øyre Slind	(Sweden) Ebba Andersson	
II	6	7 January 2018	(Sweden) Piteå	20 km C Mass Start	(Finland) Johanna Matintalo	(Sweden) Charlotte Kalla	(Sweden) Ebba Andersson	
III	7	23 February 2018	(Norway) Trondheim	Sprint F	(Norway) Anne Kjersti Kalvå	(Sweden) Jonna Sundling	(Norway) Tiril Udnes Weng	
III	8	24 February 2018	(Norway) Trondheim	5 km C	(Norway) Thea Krokan Murud	(Sweden) Frida Karlsson	(Norway) Mari Eide	
III	9	25 February 2018	(Norway) Trondheim	10 km F Pursuit	(Finland) Susanna Saapunki	(Norway) Silje Øyre Slind	(Sweden) Frida Karlsson	
III	Mini-tour Overall (23–25 February 2018)				(Norway) Tiril Udnes Weng	(Norway) Anne Kjersti Kalvå	(Sweden) Frida Karlsson	

== Overall standings ==
=== Men's overall standings ===
Rank		Points
1	(Norway) Mattis Stenshagen	301
2	(Norway) Eirik Sverdrup Augdal	283
3	(Norway) Daniel Stock	275
4	(Norway) Johan Hoel	274
5	(Norway) Sindre Bjørnestad Skar	258
6	(Norway) Mathias Rundgreen	238
7	(Norway) Mattis Stenshagen	206
8	(Norway) Per Kristian Nygård	155
9	(Norway) Jan Thomas Jenssen	148
10	(Norway) Erik Valnes	147

=== Women's overall standings ===
Rank		Points
1	(Norway) Tiril Udnes Weng	302
2	(Norway) Lotta Udnes Weng	264
3	(Sweden) Jonna Sundling	240
4	(Norway) Silje Øyre Slind	233
5	(Sweden) Maja Dahlqvist	210
6	(Norway) Anna Svendsen	187
7	(Norway) Silje Theodorsen	182
8	(Norway) Amalie Håkonsen Ous	167
9	(Finland) Johanna Matintalo	160
10	(Norway) Anne Kjersti Kalvå	154
