= Patrīcija Eiduka =

Latvian cross-country skier (born 2000)

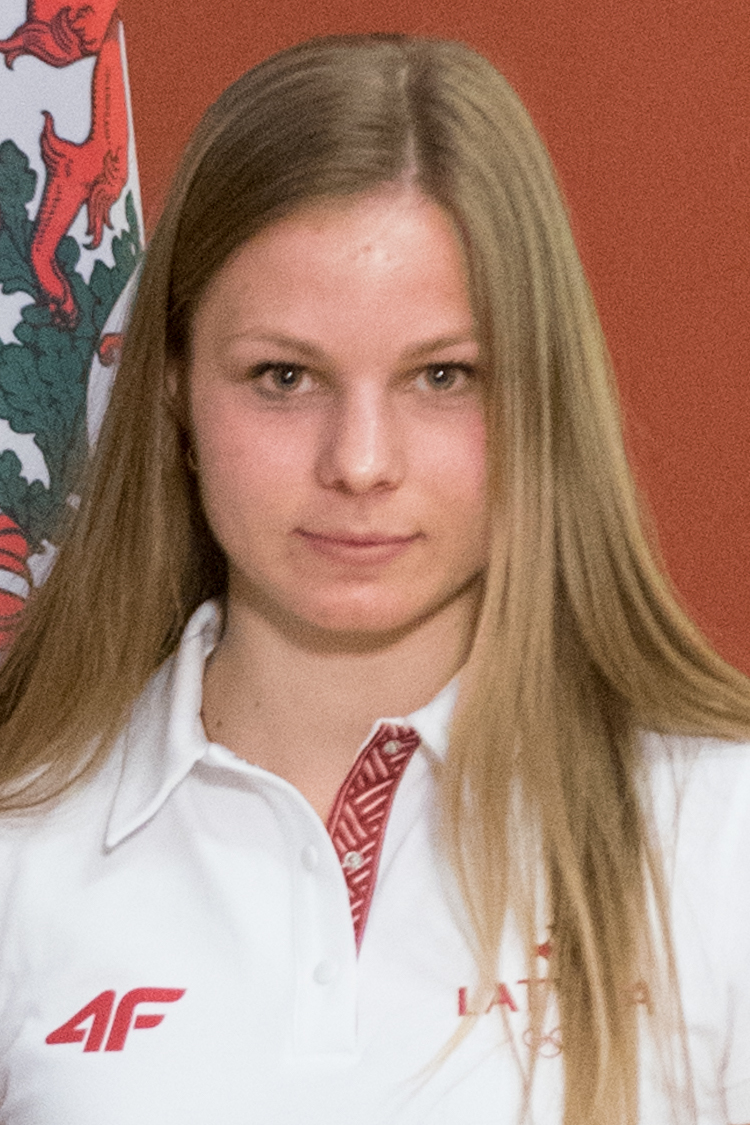

Personal information
- Nationality: Latvia
- Born: 1 February 2000 (age 26) Riga, Latvia

Sport
- Sport: Skiing
- Club: Aizkraukle

World Cup career
- Seasons: 6 – (2019–present)
- Indiv. starts: 79
- Indiv. podiums: 0
- Team starts: 2
- Team podiums: 0
- Overall titles: 0 – (22nd in 2023)
- Discipline titles: 1 – (1 U23: 2023)
Medal record
Women's cross-country skiing
Representing Latvia
U23 World Championships
Silver medal – second place	2022 Lygna	10 km classical
- Updated on 7 January 2024

Patrīcija Eiduka (born 1 February 2000) is a cross-country skier from Latvia. She started skiing at age three in Vecbebri. Eiduka competed for Latvia at the 2018 Winter Olympics. She competed at the 2022 Winter Olympics, in Women's 10 kilometre classical, Women's 30 kilometre freestyle, Women's 15 kilometre skiathlon, Women's sprint, and Women's 4 × 5 kilometre relay. She placed eleventh in the 50 km classical race at the 2026 Winter Olympics.

== Cross-country skiing results ==
All results are sourced from the International Ski Federation (FIS).

=== Olympic Games ===
Year	Age	10 km individual	15 km skiathlon	30/ 50 km mass start	Sprint	4 × 5 km relay	Team sprint
2018	18	44	DNS	—	62	—	—
2022	22	23	DNS	32	32	17	—
2026	26	15	23	11	—	17	13

=== World Championships ===
Year	Age	10 km individual	15 km skiathlon	30 km mass start	Sprint	4 × 5 km relay	Team sprint
2017	17	—	—	—	56	—	—
2019	19	52	—	—	36	—	—
2021	21	43	38	—	43	—	—
2023	23	19	11	17	—	13	—

=== World Cup ===
==== Season titles ====
- 1 title – (U23)

Season
Season	Discipline
2023	Under-23

==== Season standings ====
Season	Age	Discipline standings				Ski Tour standings			
Season	Age	Overall	Distance	Sprint	U23	Nordic Opening	Tour de Ski	Ski Tour 2020	World Cup Final
2019	19	NC	NC	NC	NC	—	DNF	—N/a	—
2020	20	111	79	NC	27	53	DNF	—	—N/a
2021	21	37	33	49	6	45	24	—N/a	—N/a
2022	22	66	48	50	9	—N/a	DNF	—N/a	—N/a
2023	23	22	18	38	1st place, gold medalist(s)	—N/a	14	—N/a	—N/a
2024	24	16	19	28	—N/a	—N/a	8	—N/a	—N/a

== Personal life ==
Her brother is fellow cross-country skier Valts Eiduks who represented Latvia during the 2006 Winter Olympics. Her father Ingus Eiduks, who died on 2 November 2021 due to COVID-19 complications, had been her long time coach.
