= Anna Comarella =

Italian cross-country skier (born 1997)

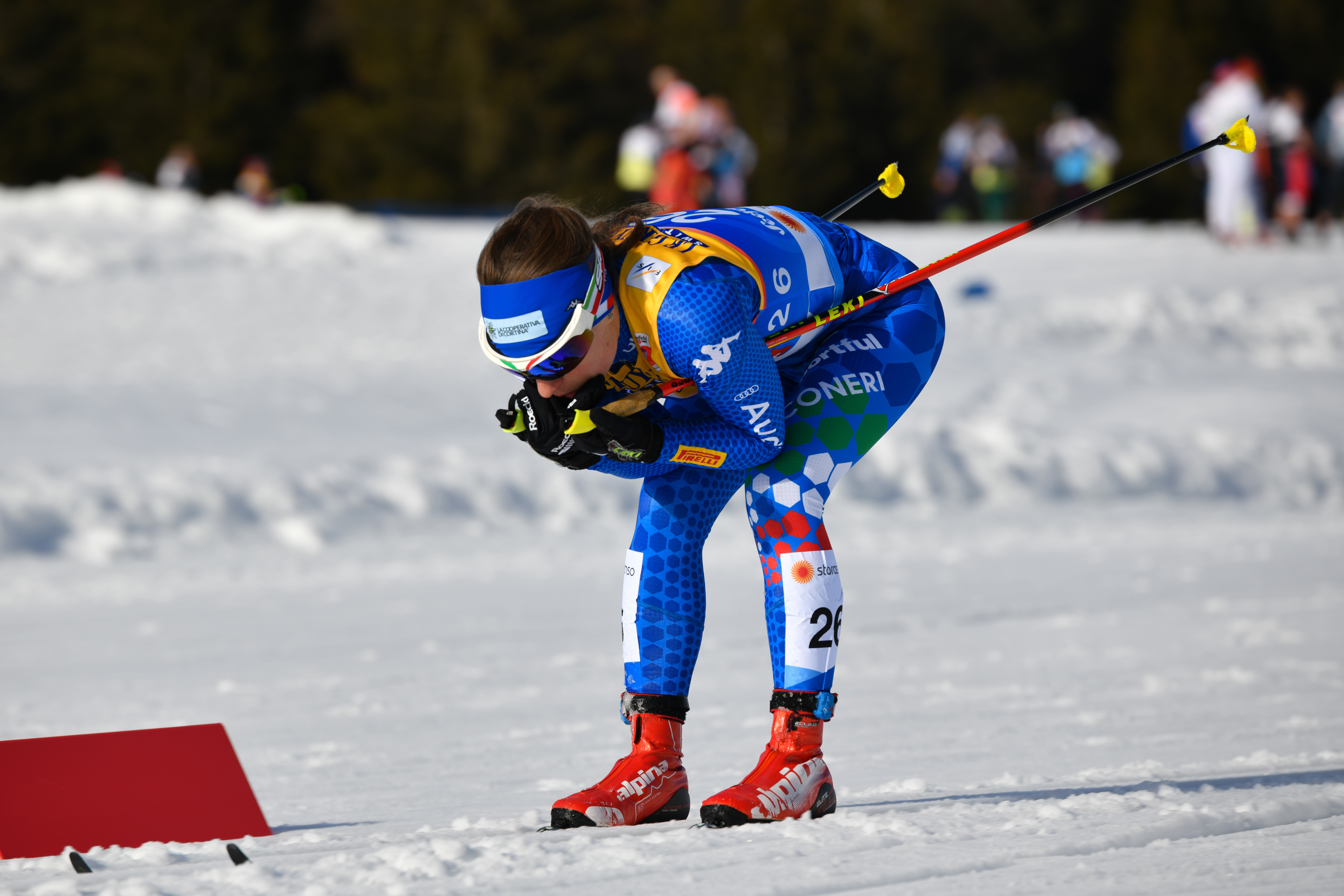
- Anna Comarella in 2019

Personal information
- Nationality: Italy
- Born: 12 March 1997 (age 29) Pieve di Cadore, Italy

Sport
- Sport: Skiing
- Club: Fiamme Oro

World Cup career
- Seasons: 6 – (2018–present)
- Indiv. starts: 65
- Indiv. podiums: 0
- Team starts: 1
- Team podiums: 0
- Overall titles: 0 – (33rd in 2021)
- Discipline titles: 0
Medal record
Women's cross-country skiing
Representing Italy
U23 World Championships
Bronze medal – third place	2020 Oberwiesenthal	4 × 5 km mixed relay
Junior World Championships
Silver medal – second place	2017 Park City	4 × 3.33 km relay
- Updated on 27 March 2023

Anna Comarella (born 12 March 1997) is an Italian cross-country skier. She competed in the women's 15 kilometre skiathlon at the 2018 Winter Olympics.

== Cross-country skiing results ==
All results are sourced from the International Ski Federation (FIS).

=== Olympic Games ===
Year	Age	10 km individual	15 km skiathlon	30 km mass start	Sprint	4 × 5 km relay	Team sprint
2018	20	—	37	34	—	9	—
2022	24	26	37	40	—	8	—
2026	27	46	36	16	—	—	—

=== World Championships ===
Year	Age	10 km individual	15 km skiathlon	30 km mass start	Sprint	4 × 5 km relay	Team sprint
2019	21	28	17	—	—	7	—
2021	23	31	21	—	—	—	—
2023	25	—	24	22	—	7	—

=== World Cup ===
==== Season standings ====
Season	Age	Discipline standings				Ski Tour standings			
Season	Age	Overall	Distance	Sprint	U23	Nordic Opening	Tour de Ski	Ski Tour 2020	World Cup Final
2018	20	NC	NC	—	NC	—	—	—N/a	—
2019	21	80	60	NC	16	—	DNF	—N/a	30
2020	22	48	33	NC	8	55	18	—	—N/a
2021	23	33	28	NC	—N/a	34	20	—N/a	—N/a
2022	24	100	71	NC	—N/a	—N/a	DNF	—N/a	—N/a
2023	25	56	40	NC	—N/a	—N/a	28	—N/a	—N/a
