= FIS Nordic World Ski Championships 2023 – Women's 30 kilometre classical =

Women's 30 kilometre classical at the FIS Nordic World Ski Championships 2023
- Venue: Planica Nordic Centre
- Location: Planica, Slovenia
- Dates: 4 March
- Competitors: 46 from 20 nations
- Winning time: 1:22:18.0

Medalists
gold medal	Ebba Andersson	Sweden
silver medal	Anne Kjersti Kalvå	Norway
bronze medal	Frida Karlsson	Sweden

The Women's 30 kilometre classical competition at the FIS Nordic World Ski Championships 2023 was held on 4 March 2023.

== Results ==
The race was started at 12:00.

Rank	Bib	Athlete	Country	Time	Deficit
1st place, gold medalist(s)	4	Ebba Andersson	Sweden	1:22:18.0	
2nd place, silver medalist(s)	7	Anne Kjersti Kalvå	Norway	1:23:11.0	+53.0
3rd place, bronze medalist(s)	3	Frida Karlsson	Sweden	1:23:12.2	+54.2
4	42	Linn Svahn	Sweden	1:23:15.7	+57.7
5	6	Rosie Brennan	United States	1:23:15.8	+57.8
6	2	Kerttu Niskanen	Finland	1:23:26.2	+1:08.2
7	8	Katharina Hennig	Germany	1:24:44.1	+2:26.1
8	10	Teresa Stadlober	Austria	1:24:47.5	+2:29.5
9	1	Tiril Udnes Weng	Norway	1:24:51.9	+2:33.9
10	14	Astrid Øyre Slind	Norway	1:24:56.3	+2:38.3
11	9	Ingvild Flugstad Østberg	Norway	1:24:56.8	+2:38.8
12	18	Masako Ishida	Japan	1:25:03.2	+2:45.2
13	20	Pia Fink	Germany	1:25:16.8	+2:58.8
14	11	Nadine Fähndrich	Switzerland	1:25:17.4	+2:59.4
15	5	Krista Pärmäkoski	Finland	1:25:31.7	+3:13.7
16	25	Juliette Ducordeau	France	1:25:41.5	+3:23.5
17	12	Patrīcija Eiduka	Latvia	1:26:04.1	+3:46.1
18	26	Hailey Swirbul	United States	1:26:31.3	+4:13.3
19	15	Emma Ribom	Sweden	1:27:10.4	+4:52.4
20	24	Laura Gimmler	Germany	1:27:10.7	+4:52.7
21	21	Kateřina Razýmová	Czech Republic	1:27:21.5	+5:03.5
22	29	Anna Comarella	Italy	1:27:28.8	+5:10.8
23	34	Katherine Sauerbrey	Germany	1:27:41.9	+5:23.9
24	36	Cristina Pittin	Italy	1:28:08.6	+5:50.6
25	23	Johanna Matintalo	Finland	1:28:24.3	+6:06.3
26	19	Anne Kyllönen	Finland	1:28:33.8	+6:15.8
27	16	Julia Kern	United States	1:28:56.4	+6:38.4
28	13	Katherine Stewart-Jones	Canada	1:29:34.3	+7:16.3
29	32	Kaidy Kaasiku	Estonia	1:29:57.5	+7:39.5
30	33	Keidy Kaasiku	Estonia	1:30:05.3	+7:47.3
31	22	Anja Weber	Switzerland	1:30:42.9	+8:24.9
32	39	Liliane Gagnon	Canada	1:31:16.0	+8:58.0
33	28	Izabela Marcisz	Poland	1:32:53.6	+10:35.6
34	35	Martina Di Centa	Italy	1:33:08.1	+10:50.1
35	31	Kseniya Shalygina	Kazakhstan	1:33:39.1	+11:21.1
36	37	Dahria Beatty	Canada	1:34:48.8	+12:30.8
37	38	Nadezhda Stepashkina	Kazakhstan	1:35:31.4	+13:13.4
38	45	Ellen Soehol Lie	Australia	1:35:45.3	+13:27.3
39	46	Sophia Tsu Velicer	Chinese Taipei	1:37:08.5	+14:50.5
40	43	Nina Riedener	Liechtenstein	1:37:47.6	+15:29.6
41	30	Miki Kodama	Japan	1:39:15.9	+16:57.9
42	44	Neza Zerjav	Slovenia	1:40:57.3	+18:39.3
	27	Sydney Palmer-Leger	United States	Did not finish	
	40	Lisa Unterweger	Austria	Did not finish	
	17	Kateřina Janatová	Czech Republic	Did not start	
	41	Darya Ryazhko	Kazakhstan	Did not start	
