= Agnetha Åsheim =

Norwegian footballer and cross-country skier (born 1982)

- Born: 1 May 1982 (age 43); Norway
- Occupations: Footballer and Cross-country skier

Agnetha Johansen Åsheim (born 1 May 1982) is a retired Norwegian footballer and cross-country skier.

== Career ==
From Tromsø, Åsheim played football for IF Fløya while also pursuing a career in cross-country skiing in the winter. She was capped three times for the Norwegian national under-17 team. When interviewed about her future plans, she stated she would probably decide to become a professional cross-country skier, where the pay was better.

Åsheim made her World Cup debut in the March 2003 Oslo sprint race. Following two races in the 2002–03 World Cup circuit and two in 2003–04, she suffered from wrongful training after the 2004 season. She reached her career bottom at the 2006 Norwegian championships with a 44th place in duathlon, returning to form in 2007 with a 10th place in the same event. Accordingly, Åsheim also managed to return to the World Cup in 2007. She collected her first World Cup points in the March 2008 Drammen sprint, finishing 21st. Her last World Cup season was 2008–09, when she finished 9th in a 4x5 km relay race. Her last World Cup outing came in March 2009 in Trondheim. She also achieved top 10 placements in Tjejvasan.

Åsheim represented the sports clubs Tromsø SK. As a teammate with Sara Svendsen in Tromsø, Åsheim's career highlight was the bronze medals in relay at the Norwegian Championships in 2007 and 2008. Åsheim and Svendsen became figureheads for achieving sports results while living in remote Northern Norway, and Åsheim was awarded an Olympiatoppen monetary grant. The duo was also awarded Tromsø Municipality's Sportsperson of the Year award.

== Personal life ==
In 2009, Åsheim earned a law degree at the University of Tromsø and is semi-retired from cross-country skiing.
