= Anna Svendsen =

Norwegian cross-country skier

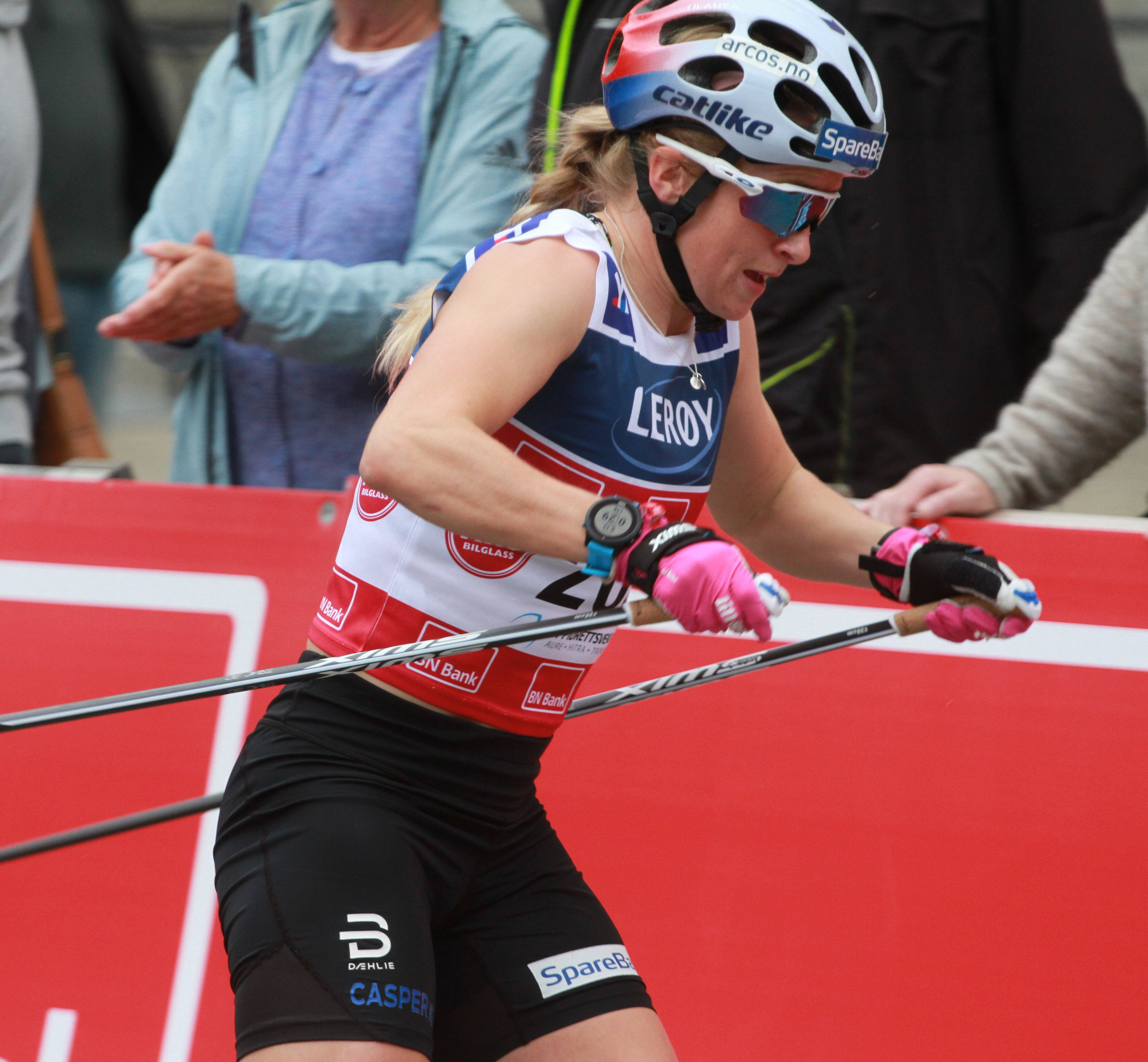
- Svendsen in 2019

Personal information
- Born: 25 March 1990 (age 36) Tromsø, Norway

Sport
- Sport: Skiing
- Club: Tromsø Skiklubb Langrenn

World Cup career
- Seasons: 10 – (2012, 2015–present)
- Indiv. starts: 80
- Indiv. podiums: 0
- Team starts: 3
- Team podiums: 1
- Team wins: 0
- Overall titles: 0 – (36th in 2019, 2020)
- Discipline titles: 0
- Updated on 27 March 2023

Anna Svendsen (born 25 March 1990) is a Norwegian cross-country skier who represents Tromsø Ski Club. She made her World Cup debut in March 2012.

Svendsen is also a trained nurse.

== Cross-country skiing results ==
All results are sourced from the International Ski Federation (FIS).

=== World Championships ===
Year	Age	10 km individual	15 km skiathlon	30 km mass start	Sprint	4 × 5 km relay	Team sprint
2021	30	—	—	—	7	—	—
2023	32	—	—	—	13	—	—

=== World Cup ===
==== Season standings ====
Season	Age	Discipline standings			Ski Tour standings				
Season	Age	Overall	Distance	Sprint	Nordic Opening	Tour de Ski	Ski Tour 2020	World Cup Final	Ski Tour Canada
2012	21	NC	—	NC	—	—	—N/a	—	—N/a
2015	24	NC	—	NC	—	—	—N/a	—N/a	—N/a
2016	25	NC	NC	NC	—	—	—N/a	—N/a	—
2017	26	42	36	32	24	—	—N/a	—	—N/a
2018	27	72	NC	44	51	—	—N/a	—	—N/a
2019	28	36	48	23	41	DNF	—N/a	—	—N/a
2020	29	36	38	21	25	—	40	—N/a	—N/a
2021	30	87	74	67	40	—	—N/a	—N/a	—N/a
2022	31	62	63	40	—N/a	38	—N/a	—N/a	—N/a
2023	32	47	53	27	—N/a	—	—N/a	—N/a	—N/a

==== Team podiums ====
- 1 podium – (1 TS)

No.	Season	Date	Location	Race	Level	Place	Teammate
1	2016–17	5 February 2017	Pyeongchang, South Korea	6 × 1.4 km Team Sprint F	World Cup	2nd	Slind
