= FIS Nordic World Ski Championships 2023 – Women's 4 × 5 kilometre relay =

Women's 4 × 5 kilometre relay at the FIS Nordic World Ski Championships 2023
- Venue: Planica Nordic Centre
- Location: Planica, Slovenia
- Dates: 2 March
- Competitors: 52 from 13 nations
- Teams: 13
- Winning time: 50:33.3

Medalists
| gold medal | Tiril Udnes Weng; Astrid Øyre Slind; Ingvild Flugstad Østberg; Anne Kjersti Kalvå | Norway |
| silver medal | Laura Gimmler; Katharina Hennig; Pia Fink; Victoria Carl | Germany |
| bronze medal | Emma Ribom; Ebba Andersson; Frida Karlsson; Maja Dahlqvist | Sweden |

The Women's 4 × 5 kilometre relay competition at the FIS Nordic World Ski Championships 2023 was held on 2 March 2023.

== Results ==
The race was started at 12:29.

| Rank | Bib | Country | Time | Deficit |
|---|---|---|---|---|
| 1st place, gold medalist(s) | 4 | Norway; Tiril Udnes Weng; Astrid Øyre Slind; Ingvild Flugstad Østberg; Anne Kjersti Kalvå | 50:33.3; 13:34.7; 13:22.2; 11:47.8; 11:48.6 | |
| 2nd place, silver medalist(s) | 1 | Germany; Laura Gimmler; Katharina Hennig; Pia Fink; Victoria Carl | 50:53.8; 13:37.2; 13:14.1; 11:59.6; 12:02.9 | +20.5 |
| 3rd place, bronze medalist(s) | 2 | Sweden; Emma Ribom; Ebba Andersson; Frida Karlsson; Maja Dahlqvist | 51:02.0; 13:34.9; 13:25.1; 11:59.6; 12:02.4 | +28.7 |
| 4 | 3 | Finland; Johanna Matintalo; Kerttu Niskanen; Eveliina Piippo; Krista Pärmäkoski | 51:03.8; 13:35.6; 13:16.0; 12:14.5; 11:57.7 | +30.5 |
| 5 | 5 | United States; Hailey Swirbul; Rosie Brennan; Jessie Diggins; Julia Kern | 52:07.9; 13:56.0; 13:43.4; 11:55.0; 12:33.5 | +1:34.6 |
| 6 | 9 | France; Juliette Ducordeau; Delphine Claudel; Flora Dolci; Léna Quintin | 53:02.9; 14:16.2; 14:02.1; 12:21.0; 12:23.6 | +2:29.6 |
| 7 | 7 | Italy; Anna Comarella; Cristina Pittin; Francesca Franchi; Federica Sanfilippo | 53:03.3; 14:16.5; 13:59.7; 12:18.6; 12:28.5 | +2:30.0 |
| 8 | 8 | Canada; Katherine Stewart-Jones; Jasmine Lyons; Liliane Gagnon; Olivia Bouffard-Nesbitt | 53:57.8; 14:13.2; 14:04.0; 12:47.0; 12:53.6 | +3:24.5 |
| 9 | 10 | Czech Republic; Adéla Nováková; Kateřina Razýmová; Kateřina Janatová; Barbora Havlíčková | 54:26.3; 14:49.2; 13:45.3; 12:28.6; 13:23.2 | +3:53.0 |
| 10 | 6 | Switzerland; Anja Weber; Nadine Fähndrich; Lea Fischer; Alina Meier | 54:50.1; 14:57.9; 13:27.6; 13:34.5; 12:50.1 | +4:16.8 |
| 11 | 13 | Slovenia; Eva Urevc; Anita Klemenčič; Anja Mandeljc; Neža Žerjav | 55:32.3; 13:49.4; 15:26.7; 13:02.1; 13:14.1 | +4:59.0 |
| 12 | 11 | Kazakhstan; Kseniya Shalygina; Aisha Rakisheva; Nadezhda Stepashkina; Darya Ryazhko | 58:13.9; 14:48.9; 15:43.5; 13:36.5; 14:05.0 | +7:40.6 |
| 13 | 12 | Latvia; Kitija Auziņa; Samanta Krampe; Linda Kaparkalēja; Patrīcija Eiduka | 1:04:01.1; 16:05.0; 17:44.2; 16:28.0; 13:43.9 | +13:37.8 |
