= Kari Øyre Slind =

Norwegian cross-country skier

Personal information
- Nationality: Norway
- Born: 22 October 1991 (age 34) Oppdal Municipality, Norway

Sport
- Sport: Skiing
- Club: Oppdal IL

World Cup career
- Seasons: 9 – (2010–2012, 2015–2020)
- Indiv. starts: 66
- Indiv. podiums: 0
- Team starts: 3
- Team podiums: 0
- Overall titles: 0 – (20th in 2016)
- Discipline titles: 0
Medal record
Women's cross-country skiing
Representing Norway
U23 World Championships
Bronze medal – third place	2013 Liberec	15 km skiathlon
Junior World Championships
Gold medal – first place	2010 Hinterzarten	4 × 3.33 km relay
Gold medal – first place	2011 Otepää	4 × 3.33 km relay
Silver medal – second place	2011 Otepää	5 km freestyle
Silver medal – second place	2011 Otepää	Individual sprint
Bronze medal – third place	2010 Hinterzarten	Individual sprint
- Updated on 29 March 2020

Kari Øyre Slind (born 22 October 1991) is a Norwegian cross-country skier who represents Oppdal IL. She is the younger sister of the twin sisters Astrid Øyre Slind and Silje Øyre Slind, who are also cross-country skiers.

== Career ==
In 2008, she won Gold in the 5 km at the Norwegian Junior National Championships, in the time of 12.18.8. That same year she won Bronze at the Spar Cup in cross-country in the K17 class.

In March 2010, she participated in the 2010 Norwegian Junior Ski Championships, and was fifth in the 15 km classic and second in the 5 km freestyle. In addition, she received Gold in the 4 × 3,75 km relay with Anne Kjersti Kalvå, Silje Dahl Benum, and Valentine Aagaard on the South Trøndelag first team. That same year she made her debut as well in the World Cup, the sprint in Drammen.

At the 2010 Junior World Championships, she won Bronze in the sprint and Gold in the relay with Heidi Weng, Tuva Toft Dahl, and Ingvild Flugstad Østberg. In January 2011, she participated in the Junior World Championships in Estonia, and this time, won Silver in the 5 km free technique and the classic sprint. Norway also won Gold in the 4 × 3.3 km relay where she went along with Ragnhild Haga, Martine Ek Hagen, and Heidi Weng. In addition, she came in sixth place in the pursuit.

She was part of Oppdal's relay team at the 2012 Norwegian Nationals, where they came in fourth place in the 3 × 5 km relay. The following year, at the Norway Cup Skiing in 2013 in January, she got Bronze in the 3 × 5 km relay. She was also selected for the U23 World Ski Championships in 2013, where she won the Bronze in the 15 km Skiathlon behind Ragnhild Haga and Debora Agreiter.

In the 2015 Norwegian Nationals, she won the 3 × 5 km relay with the Oppdal team of all three Øyre Slinde sisters. In addition, she was fifth place in the free technique team sprint and sixth place in the 30 km classic.

The 2015-16 season was Slind's first full season with the Norwegian national season on the World Cup. She achieved her World Cup personal bests by placing fifth in the Davos 15 km freestyle race on December 12, 2015, and also fifth in the 10 km freestyle stage of Ski Tour Canada on March 11, 2015.

== Cross-country skiing results ==
All results are sourced from the International Ski Federation (FIS).

=== World Cup ===
==== Season standings ====
Season	Age	Discipline standings			Ski Tour standings				
Season	Age	Overall	Distance	Sprint	Nordic Opening	Tour de Ski	Ski Tour 2020	World Cup Final	Ski Tour Canada
2010	18	NC	—	NC	—N/a	—	—N/a	—	—N/a
2011	19	88	—	60	—	—	—N/a	—	—N/a
2012	20	NC	—	NC	—	—	—N/a	—	—N/a
2015	23	NC	NC	—	—	—	—N/a	—N/a	—N/a
2016	24	20	16	69	16	18	—N/a	—N/a	15
2017	25	59	37	NC	26	—	—N/a	—	—N/a
2018	26	57	28	NC	—	—	—N/a	32	—N/a
2019	27	23	19	51	24	9	—N/a	25	—N/a
2020	28	68	47	74	—	DNF	—	—N/a	—N/a
