= 2011 Nordic Junior World Ski Championships =

International skiing competition

FIS Nordic Junior and U23 World Ski Championships 2011
- Host city: Otepää, Estonia
- Events: 19
- Opening: 26 January
- Closing: 31 January

The 2011 FIS Nordic Junior World Ski Championships were held in Otepää, Estonia from 26 January to 31 January 2011. It was the 34th Junior World Championships and the 6th Under-23 World Championships in Nordic skiing.

== Medal summary ==
=== Junior events ===
==== Cross-country skiing ====
Event	Gold		Silver		Bronze	
Men's Junior Events
Men's junior 10 kilometre freestyle	Sindre Bjørnestad Skar; Norway	24:05.2	Markus Weeger; Germany	+16.0	Perttu Hyvärinen; Finland	+17.5
Men's junior sprint classic	Sergey Ustiugov; Russia		Sondre Turvoll Fossli; Norway		Gleb Retivykh; Russia	
Men's junior 20 kilometre skiathlon	Markus Weeger; Germany	53:31.1	Konstantin Kuleev; Russia	+19.5	Perttu Hyvärinen; Finland	+19.9
Men's junior 4×5 km relay	Norway; Emil Iversen; Erik Bergfall Brovold; Mathias Rundgreen; Sindre Bjørnestad Skar	49:10.5	Russia; Gleb Retivykh; Sergey Ustiugov; Konstantin Kuleev; Denis Kataev	49:12.7	Finland; Sami Lahdemäki; Iivo Niskanen; Antti Ojansivu; Perttu Hyvärinen	49:23.3
Ladies' Junior Events
Ladies' junior 5 kilometre freestyle	Ragnhild Haga; Norway	13:50.6	Kari Øyre Slind; Norway	+5.6	Heidi Weng; Norway	+8.0
Ladies' junior sprint classic	Lucia Anger; Germany		Kari Øyre Slind; Norway		Ragnhild Haga; Norway	
Ladies' junior 10 kilometre skiathlon	Heidi Weng; Norway	31:08.4	Martine Ek Hagen; Norway	+1.6	Helene Jacob; Germany	+2.1
Ladies' junior 4×3.33 km relay	Norway; Ragnhild Haga; Martine Ek Hagen; Heidi Weng; Kari Øyre Slind	35:03.6	Russia; Elena Serokhvostova; Anna Scherbinina; Anna Nechaevskaya; Elena Soboleva	35:26.2	Germany; Lucia Anger; Theresa Eichhorn; Helene Jacob; Hanna Kolb	35:38.3

Notes

- Ladies' junior 5 km freestyle: The Norwegians were sovereign in the race, conquering the top four places.
- Men's junior 10 km freestyle: Norway continued it superb performances with Skar taking the victory by over 15 seconds. Finland's Perttu Hyvärinen did a great job on the last lap by rising from 6th to 3rd place and grabbing the medal.

==== Nordic combined ====
Event	Gold	Silver	Bronze
Men's individual normal hill/5 km	(Slovenia) Marjan Jelenko	(Germany) Johannes Rydzek	(Estonia) Kaarel Nurmsalu
Men's individual normal hill/10 km	(Germany) Johannes Rydzek	(Slovenia) Marjan Jelenko	(Estonia) Kaarel Nurmsalu
Men's team normal hill/4×5 km	Event cancelled		

==== Ski jumping ====
Event	Gold		Silver		Bronze	
Men's Junior Events
Men's junior individual normal hill	Vladimir Zografski; Bulgaria	255.0	Stefan Kraft; Austria	251.0	Kaarel Nurmsalu; Estonia	249.0
Men's junior team normal hill	Austria; Markus Schiffner; Michael Hayböck; Stefan Kraft; Thomas Lackner	920.5	Germany; Daniel Wenig; Stephan Leyhe; Marinus Kraus; Richard Freitag	913.0	Norway; Mats Søhagen Berggaard; Sigmund Hagehaugen; Espen Røe; Anders Fannemel	876.0
Ladies' Junior Events
Ladies' junior individual normal hill	Coline Mattel; France	257.5	Špela Rogelj; Slovenia	254.0	Yuki Ito; Japan	252.0
Ladies' junior team normal hill	Event cancelled					

=== Under-23 events ===
==== Cross-country skiing ====
Event	Gold		Silver		Bronze	
Men's Under-23 Events
Men's under-23 15 kilometre free	Evgeniy Belov; Russia	35:26.3	Pavel Vikulin; Russia	35:42.4	Raul Shakirzianov; Russia	35:49.7
Men's under-23 sprint classic	Alexander Panzhinskiy; Russia		Timo André Bakken; Norway		Magnus Moholt; Norway	
Men's under-23 30 kilometre skiathlon	Alex Harvey; Canada	1:13:47.9	Evgeniy Belov; Russia	1:13:48.6	Raul Shakirzianov; Russia	1:14:23.6
Ladies' Under-23 Events
Ladies' under-23 10 kilometre free	Krista Lähteenmäki; Finland	26:33.3	Mariya Guschina; Russia	27:33.3	Hilde Lauvhaug; Norway	27:35.1
Ladies' under-23 sprint classic	Kerttu Niskanen; Finland		Britt Ingunn Nydal; Norway		Jennie Öberg; Sweden	
Ladies' under-23 15 kilometre skiathlon	Ingvild Flugstad Østberg; Norway	41:55.5	Britt Ingunn Nydal; Norway	42:01.9	Kerttu Niskanen; Finland	42:02.9

Notes

- Ladies under-23 10 km freestyle: In extremely cold weather at -20 degrees Celsius, Krista Lähteenmäki, 20, lead from start to finish to take gold by a crushing 1- minute deficit to the second placed Maria Guschina. Although only 20 years old the finn had already placed 8th in the 2010–11 Tour de Ski. The defending champion Kerttu Niskanen, also a finn, lost over 1 1/2 minutes to her teammate, placing 9th. Norway took already their 5th medal in the games, with Hilde Lauvhaug finishing 3rd.

=== Medal table ===
* Host nation (Estonia)

Rank	Nation	Gold	Silver	Bronze	Total
1	Norway	6	7	5	18
2	Russia	3	6	3	12
3	Germany	3	3	2	8
4	Finland	2	0	4	6
5	Slovenia	1	2	0	3
6	Austria	1	1	0	2
7	Bulgaria	1	0	0	1
7	Canada	1	0	0	1
7	France	1	0	0	1
10	Estonia*	0	0	3	3
11	Japan	0	0	1	1
11	Sweden	0	0	1	1
Totals (12 entries)		19	19	19	57
