= Linn Sömskar =

Swedish cross-country skier (born 1989)

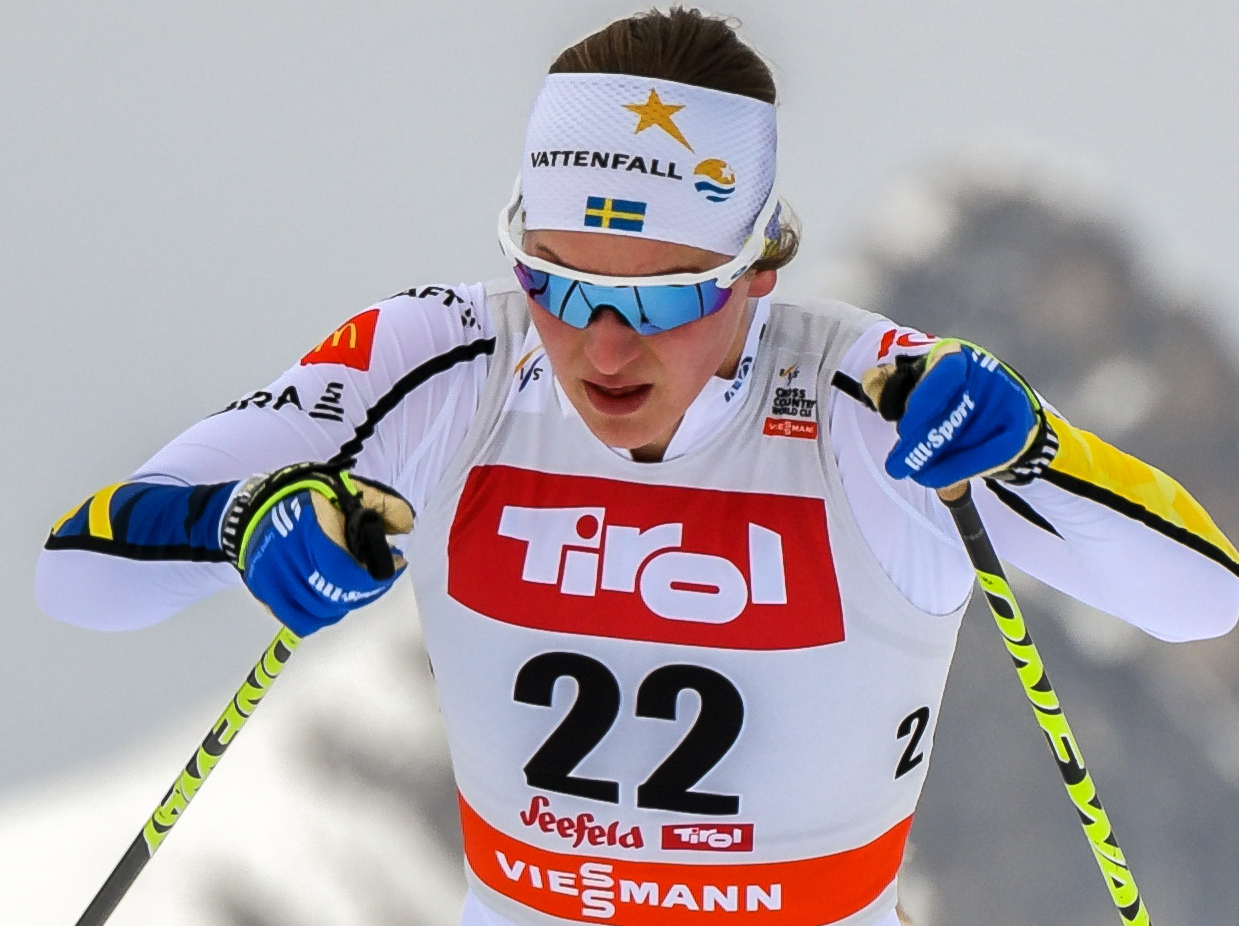
- Sömskar in 2018

Personal information
- Full name: Linn Sofia Sömskar
- Nationality: Sweden
- Born: 3 June 1989 (age 37) Umeå, Sweden

Sport
- Sport: Skiing
- Club: IFK Umeå

World Cup career
- Seasons: 11 – (2011–2020, 2023)
- Indiv. starts: 84
- Indiv. podiums: 0
- Team starts: 9
- Team podiums: 2
- Team wins: 0
- Overall titles: 0 – (36th in 2016)
- Discipline titles: 0
Medal record
Representing Sweden
Cross-country skiing
Swedish National Cross County Skiing Championships
Gold medal – first place	2018 Skellefteå	4 × 5 km relay
Gold medal – first place	2019 Sundsvall	4 × 5 km relay
Bronze medal – third place	2016 Piteå	Individual sprint
Roller skiing
Roller Skiing World Championships
Gold medal – first place	2015 Val di Fiemme	10 km classical
Gold medal – first place	2015 Val di Fiemme	Team sprint
Gold medal – first place	2017 Sollefteå	18 km freestyle
Gold medal – first place	2017 Sollefteå	16 km classical
Gold medal – first place	2017 Sollefteå	Team sprint
Gold medal – first place	2019 Madona	Individual sprint
Gold medal – first place	2019 Madona	15 km freestyle
Gold medal – first place	2019 Madona	Team sprint
Gold medal – first place	2021 Val di Fiemme	10 km freestyle
Gold medal – first place	2021 Val di Fiemme	13&nbsnbkm classical
Gold medal – first place	2024 Ziano Di Fiemme	15 km freestyle
Silver medal – second place	2015 Val di Fiemme	Individual sprint
Silver medal – second place	2021 Val di Fiemme	Individual sprint
Bronze medal – third place	2017 Sollefteå	Individual sprint
Bronze medal – third place	2019 Madona	10 km classical
- Updated on 27 March 2023

Linn Sömskar (born 3 June 1989) is a Swedish cross-country skier and roller skier. She is a ten time gold medalist at the Roller Skiing World Championships. She won multiple medals at the 2019 Roller Skiing World Cup. In cross-country skiing, she has won multiple Scandinavian Cup medals, and was part of the team that won the relay event at the 2018 and 2019 Swedish Championships.

== Career ==
Sömskar trains at IFK Umeå sports club. In 2009, Sömskar was selected for the FIS Junior Cross-Country Skiing World Championships in France. Both of her parents had previously competed at the event in 1980. She came third in the 2012–13 FIS Cross-Country World Cup team sprint event in Liberec, Czech Republic, alongside Magdalena Pajala.

In 2015, Sömskar won a prologue race in Bruksvallarna, Sweden. She competed in the 2015–16 FIS Cross-Country World Cup 15 km event in Davos, Switzerland, as a late replacement for Maria Rydqvist. She came third in the 2015–16 Scandinavian Cup sprint race in Östersund, Sweden. (Note: As the finals were cancelled, the qualification results counted.) At the 2016–17 Scandinavian Cup, Sömskar came third in the 5 km and 10 km pursuit races in Madona, Latvia. Sömskar, Jonna Sundling and Elina Rönnlund won the relay event at the Swedish Championships in 2018 and 2019.

In 2018, Sömskar won both events at the Roller Skiing World Cup event in Torsby, Sweden. In 2019, she won multiple Roller Skiing World Cup medals. She won the 1,500 metres sprint event at the opening World Cup event in Beijing. She came third in the Dresden team sprint event alongside Evelina Settlin, which was her second career World Cup podium. At the Roller Skiing World Cup event in Madona, Latvia, she won the 200 metres sprint, and 15 km mass start events, and came third in the 10 km event. At the 2019–20 Scandinavian Cup, Sömskar came third in the 20 km cross-country race in Vuokatti, Finland, second in the 10 km race in Vuokatti, and third in the 20 km race in Nes, Norway. She came second overall in the Scandinavian Cup overall standings.

In 2020, Sömskar was not selected in the Swedish cross-country team for the 2020–21 season. She then changed discipline to long-distance cross-country skiing, representing Team Nordic Athlete. Her first long-distance event was in 2021 in La Diagonela, Switzerland. She had to abandon the race after suffering from blisters on her hands. At the 2021 Swedish Championships, Sömskar and Rebecca Öhrn came seventh in the team sprint event. At the 2021 Roller Skiing World Championships in Val di Fiemme, she won the 10 kilometre freestyle and the classic technique events.

== Cross-country skiing results ==
All results are sourced from the International Ski Federation (FIS).

=== World Cup ===
==== Season standings ====
Season	Age	Discipline standings			Ski Tour standings				
Season	Age	Overall	Distance	Sprint	Nordic Opening	Tour de Ski	Ski Tour 2020	World Cup Final	Ski Tour Canada
2011	21	100	—	69	—	—	—N/a	—	—N/a
2012	22	67	NC	42	—	—	—N/a	—	—N/a
2013	23	52	NC	25	67	—	—N/a	—	—N/a
2014	24	NC	—	NC	—	—	—N/a	—	—N/a
2015	25	77	NC	42	—	—	—N/a	—N/a	—N/a
2016	26	36	69	16	30	—	—N/a	—N/a	—
2017	27	70	78	44	—	—	—N/a	—	—N/a
2018	28	41	54	20	35	29	—N/a	34	—N/a
2019	29	61	80	34	—	DNF	—N/a	—	—N/a
2020	30	42	54	25	—	—	21	—N/a	—N/a
2022	33	124	86	—	—N/a	—	—N/a	—N/a	—N/a

==== Team podiums ====
- 2 podiums – (2 TS)

No.	Season	Date	Location	Race	Level	Place	Teammate
1	2012–13	13 January 2013	Liberec, Czech Republic	6 × 0.85 km Team Sprint F	World Cup	3rd	Pajala
2	2019–20	12 January 2020	Dresden, Germany	12 × 0.65 km Team Sprint F	World Cup	3rd	Settlin

== Personal life ==
Sömskar is from Umeå, Sweden. She went to school in Lycksele. Her parents Stina Karlsson and Ingmar Sömskar are former skiers.
