= Astrid Øyre Slind =

Norwegian cross-country skier (born 1988)

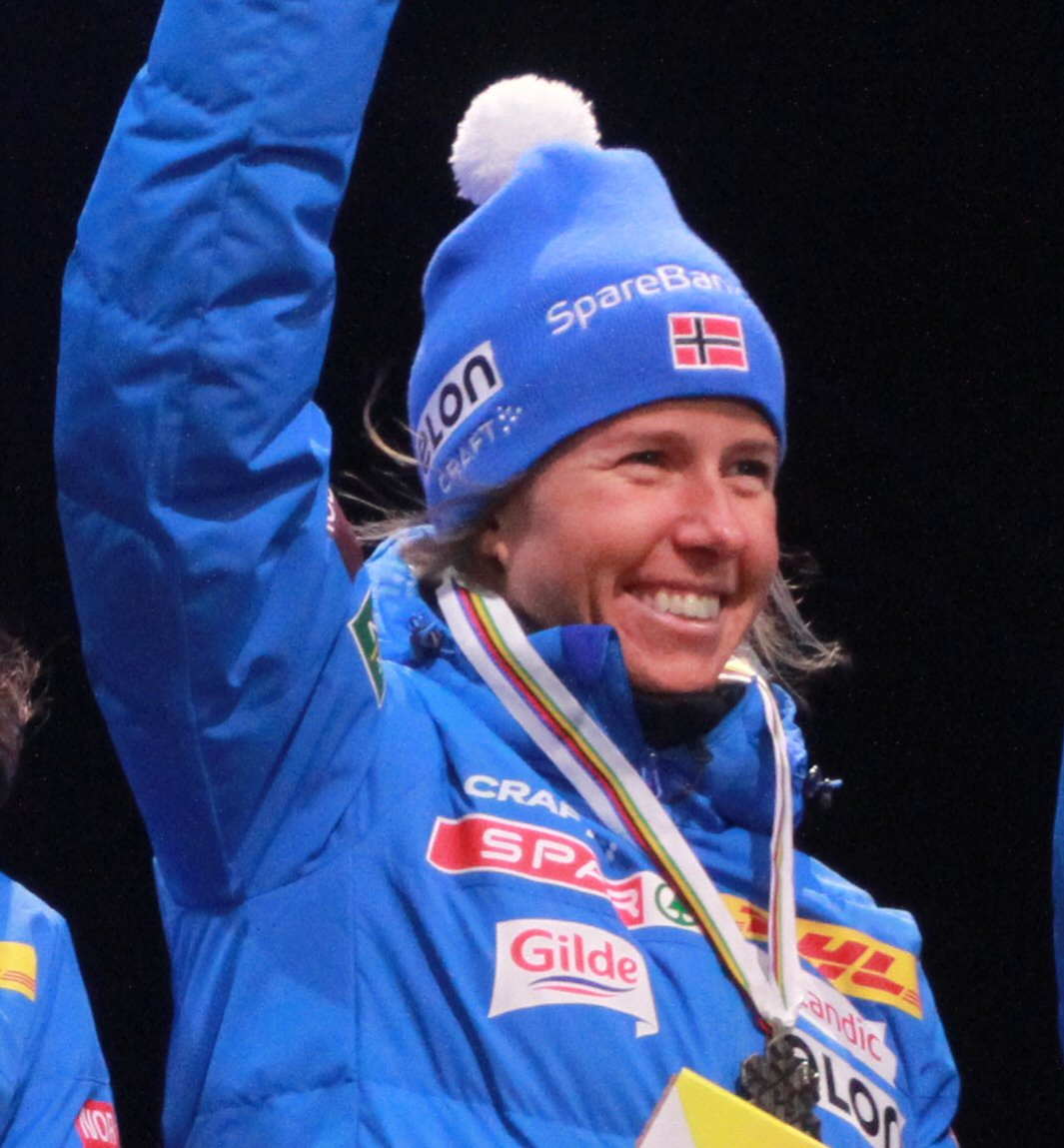
- Slind in 2025

Personal information
- Nationality: Norway
- Born: 9 February 1988 (age 38)

Sport
- Sport: Skiing
- Club: Oppdal IL

World Cup career
- Seasons: 11 – (2008–2014, 2023–present)
- Indiv. starts: 82
- Indiv. podiums: 19
- Indiv. wins: 5
- Team starts: 5
- Team podiums: 3
- Overall titles: 0 – (4th in 2025)
- Discipline titles: 0
Medal record
Women's cross-country skiing
Representing Norway
Olympic Games
Gold medal – first place	2026 Milano Cortina	4 × 7.5 km relay
World Championships
Gold medal – first place	2023 Planica	4 × 5 km relay
Silver medal – second place	2025 Trondheim	4 x 7.5 km relay
Bronze medal – third place	2023 Planica	15 km skiathlon
U23 World Championships
Gold medal – first place	2010 Hinterzarten	15 km skiathlon
Silver medal – second place	2009 Praz de Lys-Sommand	15 km skiathlon
- Updated on 22 March 2026

Astrid Øyre Slind (born 9 February 1988) is a Norwegian cross-country skier.

== Career ==
She competed at the 2009, 2010 and 2011 Junior World Championships (U23 class). In 2009 she won the silver medal in the 15 km pursuit, and in 2010 the gold medal in the same event. At the 2013 Winter Universiade she won the bronze medal in the 15 km and the gold medal in the 5 km.

She made her World Cup debut in March 2008 at the Holmenkollen ski festival, finishing 44th in the 30 km. In her next race she also collected her first World Cup points, finishing 22nd in the December 2008 Davos 10 km. Another highlight was the March 2009 races in Falun, where she finished 20th in the sprint and 25th overall. Her last World Cup outing came at the 2014 Holmenkollen ski festival.

On 6 March 2022, she won the women's edition of Vasaloppet.

She represents the sports club Oppdal IL. She is a twin sister of Silje Øyre Slind and older sister of Kari Øyre Slind.

== Cross-country skiing results ==
All results are sourced from the International Ski Federation (FIS).

=== Olympic Games ===
- 1 medal – (1 gold)

Year	Age	10 km individual	20 km skiathlon	50 km mass start	Sprint	4 × 7.5 km relay	Team sprint
2026	38	4	6	DNF	—	Gold	4

=== World Championships ===
- 3 medals – (1 gold, 1 silver, 1 bronze)

Year	Age	10 km individual	15/20 km skiathlon	30/50 km mass start	Sprint	4 × 5/7.5 km relay	Team sprint
2023	35	—	Bronze	10	—	Gold	—
2025	37	5	8	10	—	Silver	—

=== World Cup ===
==== Season standings ====
Season	Age	Discipline standings			Ski Tour standings		
Season	Age	Overall	Distance	Sprint	Nordic Opening	Tour de Ski	World Cup Final
2008	20	NC	NC	—	—N/a	—	—
2009	21	66	42	NC	—N/a	—	25
2010	22	NC	NC	NC	—N/a	DNF	—
2011	23	114	82	NC	—	—	—
2012	24	90	70	—	—	—	—
2013	25	NC	NC	—	—	—	—
2014	26	NC	NC	—	—	—	—
2023	35	27	16	83	—N/a	7	—N/a
2024	36	19	11	71	—N/a	DNF	—N/a
2025	37	4	2nd place, silver medalist(s)	95	—N/a	2nd place, silver medalist(s)	—N/a
2026	38	24	7	118	—N/a	DNF	—N/a

==== Individual podiums ====
- 5 wins – (2 WC, 3 SWC)
- 19 podiums – (13 WC, 6 SWC)

No.	Season	Date	Location	Race	Level	Place
1	2022–23	29 January 2023	Les Rousses, France	20 km Mass Start C	World Cup	3rd
2	2022–23	12 March 2023	Oslo, Norway	50 km Mass Start F	World Cup	2nd
3	2024–25	29 November 2024	Rukatunturi, Finland	10 km Individual C	World Cup	3rd
4	2024–25	6 December 2024	Lillehammer, Norway	10 km Individual F	World Cup	3rd
5	2024–25	15 December 2024	Davos, Switzerland	20 km Individual C	World Cup	1st
6	2024–25	29 December 2024	Toblach, Italy	15 km Mass Start C	Stage World Cup	3rd
7	2024–25	31 December 2024	Toblach, Italy	20 km Individual F	Stage World Cup	1st
8	2024–25	1 January 2025	Toblach, Italy	15 km Pursuit C	Stage World Cup	1st
9	2024–25	4 January 2025	Val di Fiemme, Italy	10 km +10 km Skiathlon C/F	Stage World Cup	3rd
10	2024–25	5 January 2025	Val di Fiemme, Italy	10 km Mass Start F	Stage World Cup	2nd
11	2024–25	28 December 2024 – 5 January 2025	(Italy) Tour de Ski	Overall Standings	World Cup	2nd
12	2024–25	17 January 2025	Les Rousses, France	10 km Individual F	World Cup	3rd
13	2024–25	26 January 2025	Engadin, Switzerland	20 km Mass Start F	World Cup	1st
14	2024–25	2 February 2025	Cogne, Italy	10 km Individual F	World Cup	2nd
15	2024–25	15 March 2025	Oslo, Norway	20 km Individual C	World Cup	2nd
16	2024–25	23 March 2025	Lahti, Finland	50 km Mass Start C	World Cup	2nd
17	2025–26	14 December 2025	Davos, Switzerland	10 km Individual F	World Cup	3rd
18	2025–26	29 December 2025	Toblach, Italy	10 km Individual C	Stage World Cup	1st
19	2025–26	25 January 2026	Goms, Switzerland	20 km Mass Start C	World Cup	3rd
