= Britt Ingunn Nydal =

Norwegian cross-country skier and orienteer

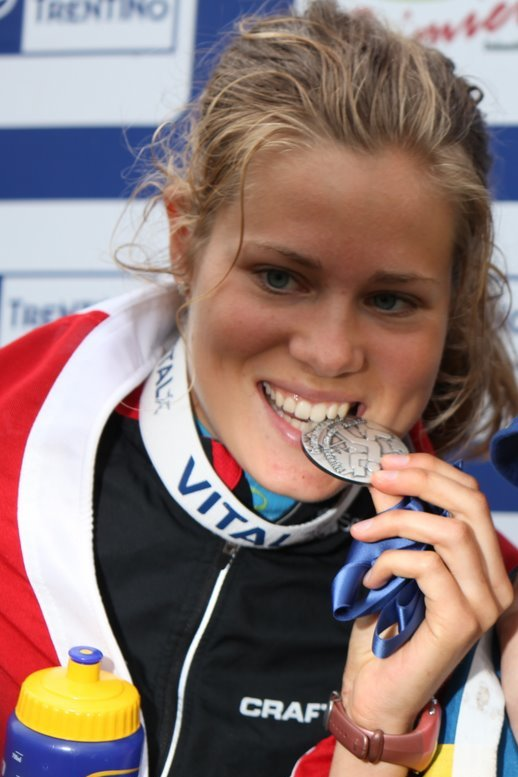
Britt Ingunn Nydal, 2008.

Britt Ingunn Nydal (born 1989) is a retired Norwegian cross-country skier and orienteer.

She competed at the 2007 European Youth Olympic Winter Festival, the 2008 Junior World Championships and the U23 class of the 2010, 2011 and 2012 Junior World Championships. Her most successful competition was in 2011, when she won two silver medals in 15 km pursuit and sprint.

She made her World Cup debut in the March 2008 Drammen sprint race. She collected her first World Cup points in the same city, finishing 29th in a 10 km race in February 2011, improving to a 25th place in January 2013 in La Clusaz. Her last World Cup outing came in December 2013 in Lillehammer.

She hails from Asker and has represented the sports clubs SK Njård.

She also won two silver medals at the 2009 Junior World Orienteering Championships, in middle distance and relay.

Today, Britt Ingunn Nydal is working as a teacher at a middle school in Oslo.
