= John Anders Gaustad =

Norwegian cross-country skier

Personal information
- Nationality: Norway
- Born: February 29, 1980 (age 46)

Sport
- Sport: Skiing
- Club: Hamar SK

World Cup career
- Seasons: 6 – (2002, 2004–2006, 2008, 2010)
- Indiv. starts: 22
- Indiv. podiums: 0
- Team starts: 6
- Team podiums: 0
- Overall titles: 0 – (28th in 2006)
- Discipline titles: 0

John Anders Gaustad (born February 29, 1980) is a Norwegian cross-country skier who has competed since 2001. His best World Cup finish was fifth in a 15 km event in Norway in November 2009.

== Cross-country skiing results ==
All results are sourced from the International Ski Federation (FIS).

=== World Cup ===
==== Season standings ====
Season	Age	Discipline standings			Ski Tour standings	
Season	Age	Overall	Distance	Sprint	Tour de Ski	World Cup Final
2002	22	NC	—N/a	—	—N/a	—N/a
2004	24	NC	NC	—	—N/a	—N/a
2005	25	88	56	—	—N/a	—N/a
2006	26	28	16	—	—N/a	—N/a
2008	28	141	82	—	—	—
2010	30	103	62	—	—	—
