= Moa Lundgren =

Swedish cross-country skier (born 1998)

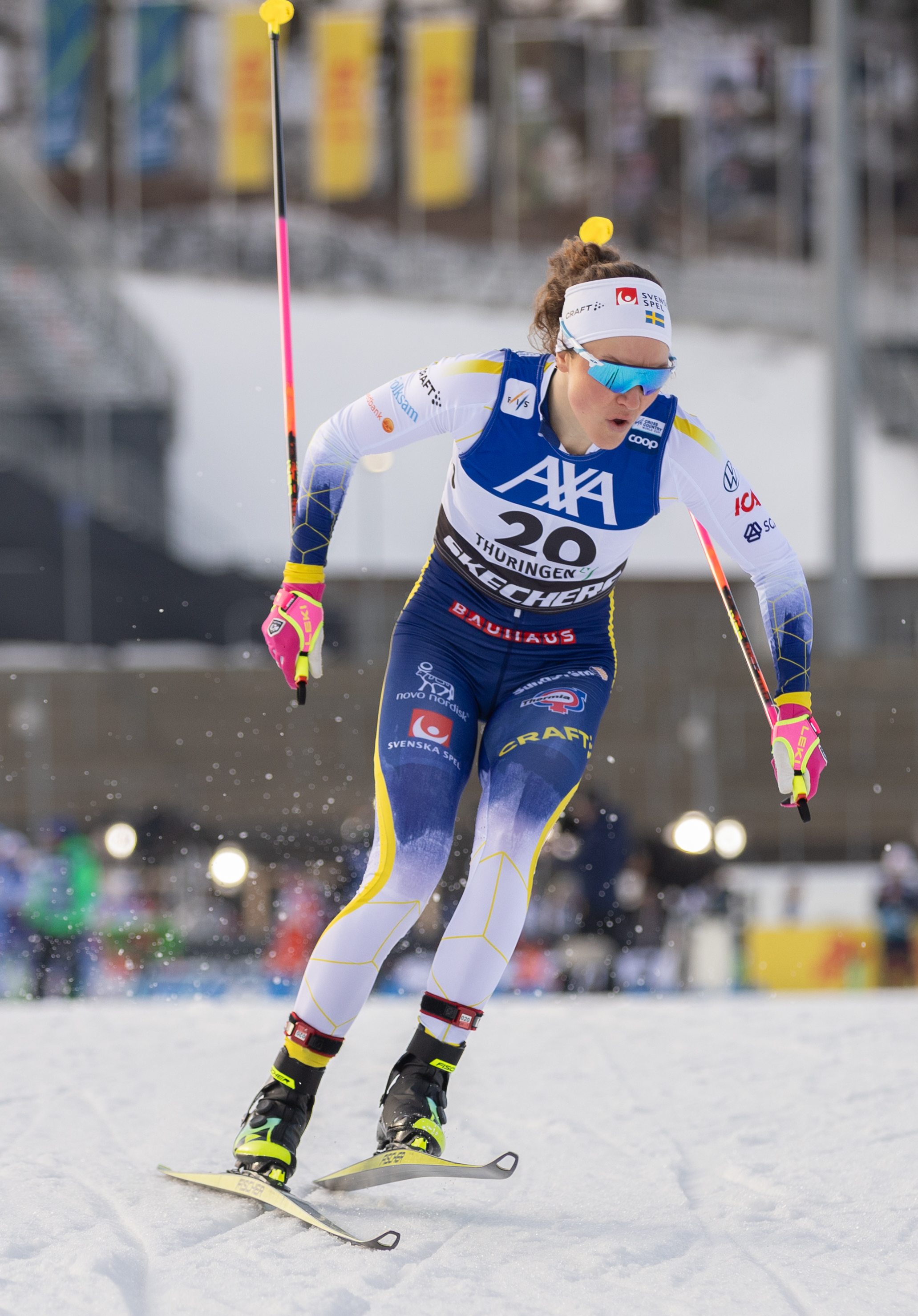

Personal information
- Full name: Hedda Moa Emilia Lundgren
- Nationality: Sweden
- Born: 14 April 1998 (age 28) Umeå, Sweden

Sport
- Sport: Skiing
- Club: Åsarna IK

World Cup career
- Seasons: 6 – (2019–present)
- Indiv. starts: 68
- Indiv. podiums: 0
- Team starts: 5
- Team podiums: 2
- Team wins: 1
- Overall titles: 0 – (27th in 2020)
- Discipline titles: 0
Medal record
Women's cross-country skiing
Representing Sweden
U23 World Championships
Gold medal – first place	2019 Lahti	Individual sprint
Silver medal – second place	2020 Oberwiesenthal	15 km freestyle
Junior World Championships
Gold medal – first place	2018 Goms	Individual sprint
Winter Youth Olympics
Gold medal – first place	2016 Lillehammer	Cross-country cross
- Updated on 7 January 2024

Moa Lundgren (born 14 April 1998) is a Swedish cross-country skier who represents the club IFK Umeå. The 2022–2023 season saw her winning the Scandinavian Cup.

== Cross-country skiing results ==
All results are sourced from the International Ski Federation (FIS).

=== World Cup ===
==== Season standings ====
Season	Age	Discipline standings				Ski Tour standings			
Season	Age	Overall	Distance	Sprint	U23	Nordic Opening	Tour de Ski	Ski Tour 2020	World Cup Final
2019	20	57	—	31	9	—	—	—N/a	—
2020	21	27	21	36	5	19	DNF	—	—N/a
2021	22	39	53	25	7	26	30	—N/a	—N/a
2022	23	57	NC	32	—N/a	—N/a	DNF	—N/a	—N/a
2023	24	37	50	19	—N/a	—N/a	—	—N/a	—N/a
2024	25	34	29	25	—N/a	—N/a	—	—N/a	—N/a

==== Team podiums ====
- 1 victory – (1 RL)
- 2 podiums – (2 RL)

No.	Season	Date	Location	Race	Level	Place	Teammates
1	2019–20	22 December 2019	Lillehammer, Norway	4 × 5 km Relay C/F	World Cup	3rd	Ribom / Rönnlund / Kalla
2	2023–24	3 December 2023	(Sweden) Gällivare, Finland	4 × 7.5 km Relay C/F	World Cup	1st	Ribom / Andersson / Ilar
