= Sara Svendsen =

Norwegian cross-country skier

Sara Svendsen (born 1980) is a retired Norwegian cross-country skier.

She made her World Cup debut in the 2003–04 season opener at Beitostølen, finishing 66th. She collected her first World Cup points with a 28th place in the February 2008 Falun 15 km pursuit, and also competed in World Cup relays. She improved to a 15th place at the Holmenkollen ski festival in March 2008. Her last World Cup outing was the 2010–11 Tour de Ski.

She represented the sports clubs Tromsø SK.
