= Barbro Kvåle =

Norwegian orienteer (born 1992)

Personal information
- Born: 21 February 1992 (age 34)

Sport
- Sport: Ski orienteering Cross country skiing
- Club: Lillehammer SK
Medal record
Representing Norway
Women's ski orienteering
World Championships
Silver medal – second place	2011 Tänndalen	Relay
Junior World Championships
Gold medal – first place	2010 Miercurea Ciuc	Long
Gold medal – first place	2010 Miercurea Ciuc	Middle
Gold medal – first place	2011 Lillehammer	Long
Silver medal – second place	2011 Lillehammer	Middle
Silver medal – second place	2011 Lillehammer	Sprint

Barbro Kvåle (born 21 February 1992) is a Norwegian cross country skier and ski orienteering competitor.

At the 2011 World Ski Orienteering Championships she won a silver medal in women's relay, along with Stine Olsen Kirkevik and Marte Reenaas on the Norwegian team, while she placed 9th in the long distance, 14th in the middle distance, and 5th in the sprint.
