= Håvard Solås Taugbøl =

Norwegian cross-country skier

Personal information
- Nationality: Norway
- Born: 20 August 1993 (age 32) Lillehammer, Norway

Sport
- Sport: Skiing
- Club: Lillehammer SK

World Cup career
- Seasons: 11 — (2014–present)
- Indiv. starts: 63
- Indiv. podiums: 8
- Indiv. wins: 1
- Team starts: 7
- Team podiums: 4
- Team wins: 0
- Overall titles: 0 – (18th in 2022)
- Discipline titles: 0
Medal record
Men's cross-country skiing
Representing Norway
World Championships
Bronze medal – third place	2021 Oberstdorf	Individual sprint
Junior World Championships
Silver medal – second place	2013 Liberec	4 × 5 km relay
Bronze medal – third place	2012 Erzurum	4 × 5 km relay
- Updated on 15 March 2024

Håvard Solås Taugbøl (born 20 August 1993) is a Norwegian cross-country skier.

He competed in four events at the 2011 European Youth Olympic Winter Festival, then three events at both the 2012 and 2013 Junior World Championships, winning a bronze and a silver medal in the relay.

He made his World Cup debut in December 2013 in the Davos sprint, also collecting his first World Cup points with 21st place. In his next World Cup outing, in March 2014, he finished 11th in the Lahti sprint. In 2014–15 he improved to a 7th place in December 2014 in Davos and 4th place in March 2015 in Lahti, both in sprints.

He represents the sports club Lillehammer SK.

== Cross-country skiing results ==
All results are sourced from the International Ski Federation (FIS).

=== Olympic Games ===
Year	Age	15 km individual	30 km skiathlon	50 km mass start	Sprint	4 × 10 km relay	Team sprint
2022	28	—	—	—^{[a]}	10	—	—

^{a} Distance reduced to 30 km due to weather conditions.

=== World Championships ===
- 1 medal – (1 bronze)

Year	Age	15 km individual	30 km skiathlon	50 km mass start	Sprint	4 × 10 km relay	Team sprint
2021	27	—	—	—	Bronze	—	—
2023	29	—	—	—	27	—	—

=== World Cup ===
==== Season standings ====
Season	Age	Discipline standings				Ski Tour standings				
Season	Age	Overall	Distance	Sprint	U23	Nordic Opening	Tour de Ski	Ski Tour 2020	World Cup Final	Ski Tour Canada
2014	20	105	NC	51	—N/a	—	—	—N/a	—	—N/a
2015	21	61	—	22	6	—	—	—N/a	—N/a	—N/a
2016	22	56	—	22	5	—	—	—N/a	—N/a	—
2017	23	50	—	19	—N/a	—	—	—N/a	—	—N/a
2018	24	89	NC	44	—N/a	—	—	—N/a	—	—N/a
2019	25	65	—	28	—N/a	—	—	—N/a	—	—N/a
2020	26	27	—	8	—N/a	—	—	—	—N/a	—N/a
2021	27	48	72	15	—N/a	29	—	—N/a	—N/a	—N/a
2022	28	18	—	5	—N/a	—N/a	—	—N/a	—N/a	—N/a
2023	29	38	—	18	—N/a	—N/a	—	—N/a	—N/a	—N/a
2024	30	21	95	4	—N/a	—N/a	30	—N/a	—N/a	—N/a

==== Individual podiums ====
- 1 victory – (1 WC)
- 8 podiums – (8 WC)

No.	Season	Date	Location	Race	Level	Place
1	2019–20	14 December 2019	Davos, Switzerland	1.5 km Sprint F	World Cup	3rd
2	2019–20	4 March 2020	Konnerud, Norway	1.5 km Sprint F	World Cup	2nd
3	2020–21	31 January 2021	Falun, Sweden	1.4 km Sprint C	World Cup	3rd
4	2021–22	18 December 2021	Dresden, Germany	1.3 km Sprint F	World Cup	1st
5	2022–23	3 February 2023	Toblach, Italy	1.4 km Sprint F	World Cup	2nd
6	2023–24	27 January 2024	Goms, Switzerland	1.5 km Sprint F	World Cup	3rd
7	2023–24	17 February 2024	(United States) Minneapolis, USA - Stifel Loppet Cup	1.5 km Sprint F	World Cup	3rd
8	2023–24	12 March 2024	Drammen, Norway	1.2 km Sprint C	World Cup	2nd

==== Team podiums ====
- 4 podiums – (1 RL, 3 TS)

No.	Season	Date	Location	Race	Level	Place	Teammate
1	2019–20	22 December 2019	Planica, Slovenia	6 × 1.2 km Team Sprint F	World Cup	2nd	Tefre
2	2021–22	19 December 2021	Dresden, Germany	12 × 0.65 km Team Sprint F	World Cup	2nd	Skar
3	2023–24	21 January 2024	Oberhof, Germany	4 × 7.5 km Relay C/F	World Cup	3rd	Tønseth / Krüger / Stenshagen
4	2023–24	1 March 2024	Lahti, Finland	6 × 1.3 km Team Sprint C	World Cup	2nd	Northug
