= Pål Trøan Aune =

Norwegian cross-country skier (born 1992)

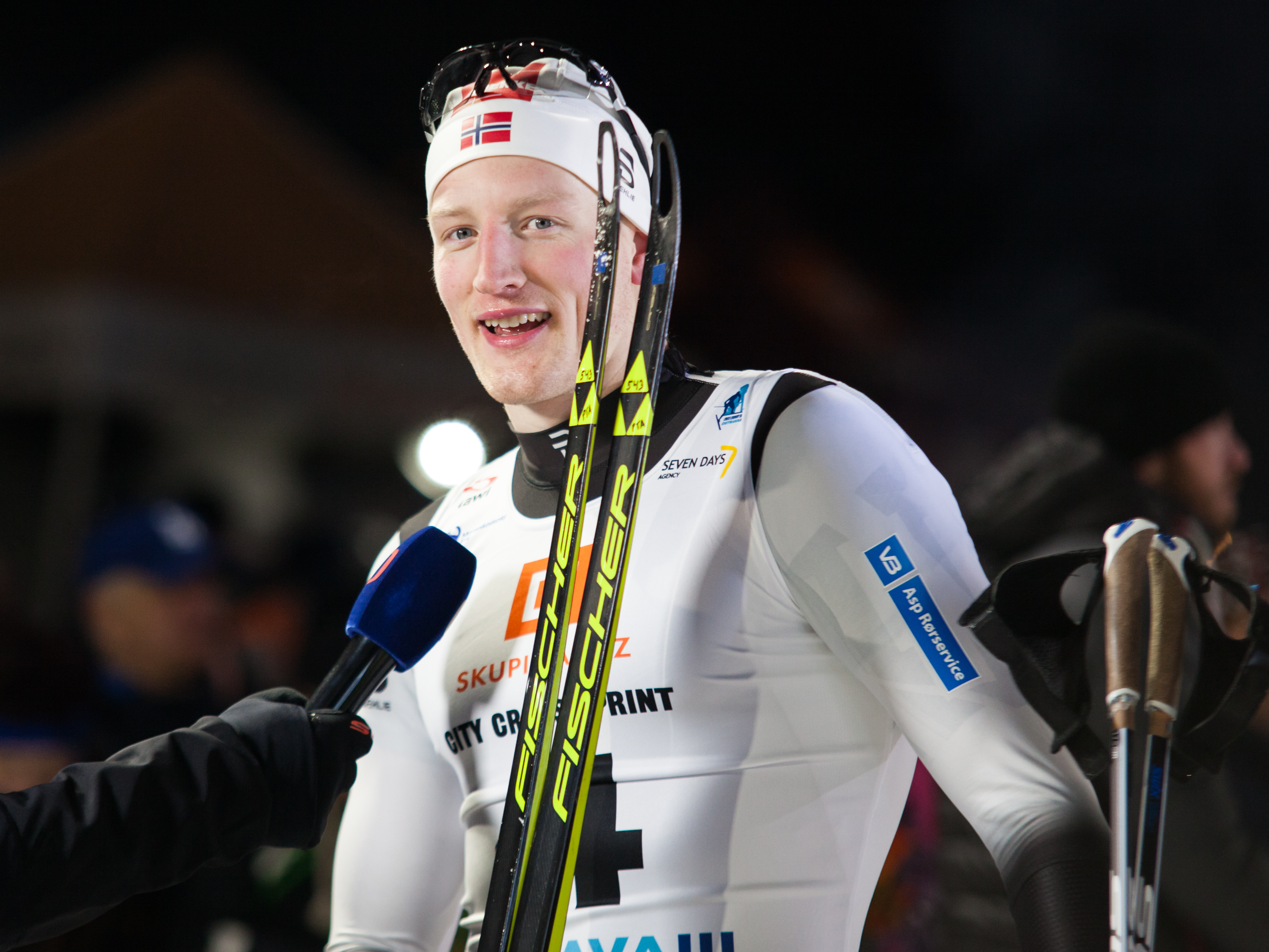

Personal information
- Nationality: Norway
- Born: 29 March 1992 (age 34)

Sport
- Sport: Skiing
- Club: Steinkjer SK

World Cup career
- Seasons: 9 – (2014–2016, 2018–2023)
- Indiv. starts: 20
- Indiv. podiums: 0
- Team starts: 3
- Team podiums: 0
- Overall titles: 0 – (51st in 2020)
- Discipline titles: 0

Pål Trøan Aune (born 29 March 1992) is a Norwegian, former cross-country skier.

He made his World Cup debut in December 2013 in Asiago, a sprint race. Competing in nothing but sprint, he collected his first World Cup points with a 20th place in February 2015 in Östersund. He improved to a ninth place in December 2017 in Lillehammer, seventh in January 2018 in Dresden, sixth in March 2019 in Drammen and fourth in January 2020 in Dresden.

He announced his retirement from cross-country skiing on March 27, 2023.

He represented the sports club Steinkjer SK.

== Cross-country skiing results ==
All results are sourced from the International Ski Federation (FIS).

=== World Cup ===
==== Season standings ====
Season	Age	Discipline standings				Ski Tour standings				
Season	Age	Overall	Distance	Sprint	U23	Nordic Opening	Tour de Ski	Ski Tour 2020	World Cup Final	Ski Tour Canada
2014	21	NC	—	NC	—N/a	—	—	—N/a	—N/a	—N/a
2015	22	128	—	73	16	—	—	—N/a	—N/a	—N/a
2016	23	108	—	63	—N/a	—	—	—N/a	—N/a	—
2018	25	59	—	23	—N/a	—	—	—N/a	—	—N/a
2019	26	69	—	33	—N/a	—	—	—N/a	—	—N/a
2020	27	51	—	18	—N/a	—	—	—	—N/a	—N/a
2021	28	92	—	51	—N/a	—	—	—N/a	—N/a	—N/a
2022	29	73	—	39	—N/a	—N/a	—	—N/a	—N/a	—N/a
2023	30	120	—	64	—N/a	—N/a	—	—N/a	—N/a	—N/a
