= Mattis Stenshagen =

Norwegian cross-country skier (born 1996)

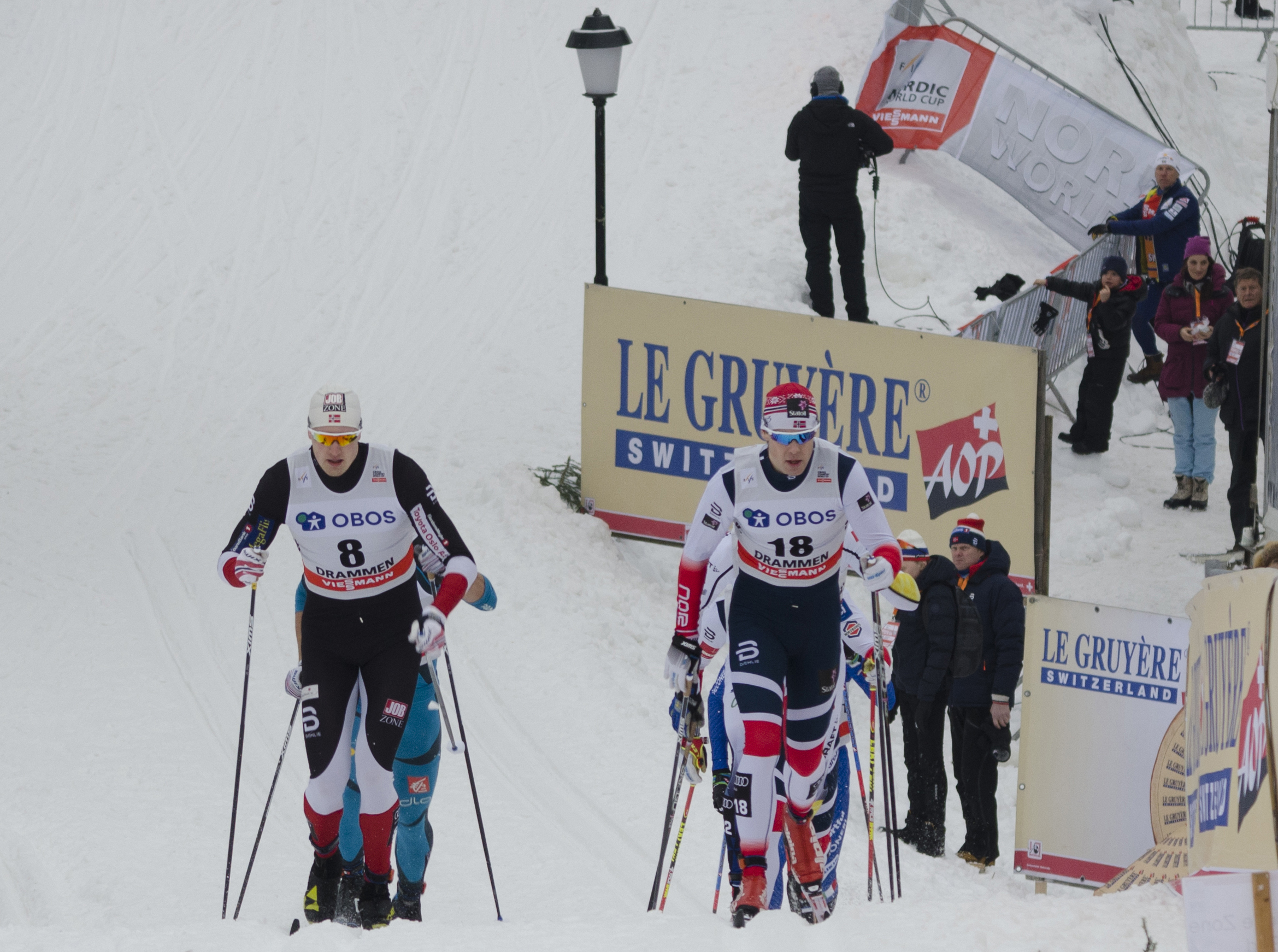
- Skiers at the Drammen ski sprint in 2018. In front, Mattis Stenshagen (right) and Pål Trøan Aune (left).

Personal information
- Nationality: Norway
- Born: 13 August 1996 (age 29) Follebu, Norway

Sport
- Sport: Skiing
- Club: Follebu SK

World Cup career
- Seasons: 9 – (2017–2020, 2022–present)
- Indiv. starts: 63
- Indiv. podiums: 7
- Indiv. wins: 2
- Team starts: 3
- Team podiums: 1
- Overall titles: 0 – (4th in 2026)
- Discipline titles: 0
Medal record
Men's cross-country skiing
Representing Norway
U23 World Championships
Gold medal – first place	2018 Goms	15 km classical
Junior World Championships
Gold medal – first place	2016 Râșnov	4 × 5 km relay
Silver medal – second place	2016 Râșnov	15 km freestyle
- Updated on 22 March 2026

Mattis Stenshagen (born 13 August 1996) is a Norwegian cross-country skier.

At the 2015 Junior World Championships he finished eighth at best, but in 2016 he won a gold medal in relay and the silver medal in the 15 km race. At the 2018 Junior World Championships, now in the U23 age class, he won the gold medal in the 15 km.

He made his World Cup debut in December 2016 in Lillehammer, collecting his first World Cup points on the next day with a 24th-place finish in the 10 km race. He broke the top 10 for the first time in January 2018 in Planica, finishing seventh in the 15 km. In January 2019 in Otepää he improved further, to fifth in sprint and eight in 15 km.

He represents the sports club Follebu SK.

== Cross-country skiing results ==
All results are sourced from the International Ski Federation (FIS).

=== Olympic Games ===
Year	Age	Individual	Skiathlon	Mass start	Sprint	Relay	Team sprint
2026	29	—	21	—	—	—	—

=== World Cup ===
==== Season standings ====
Season	Age	Discipline standings				Ski Tour standings			
Season	Age	Overall	Distance	Sprint	U23	Nordic Opening	Tour de Ski	Ski Tour 2020	World Cup Final
2017	20	143	99	NC	15	31	—	—N/a	—
2018	21	69	49	63	10	—	—	—N/a	—
2019	22	62	52	40	—	46	—	—N/a	—
2020	23	117	70	NC	—N/a	—	—	—	—N/a
2022	25	NC	NC	—	—N/a	—N/a	—	—N/a	—N/a
2023	26	47	25	—	—N/a	—N/a	—	—N/a	—N/a
2024	27	39	23	58	—N/a	—N/a	—	—N/a	—N/a
2025	28	85	50	—	—N/a	—N/a	—	—N/a	—N/a
2026	29	4	5	49	—N/a	—N/a	2nd place, silver medalist(s)	—N/a	—N/a

==== Individual podiums ====
- 2 wins – (2 SWC)
- 7 podiums – (4 WC, 3 SWC)

No.	Season	Date	Location	Race	Level	Place
1	2023–24	11 February 2024	Canmore, Canada	20 km Mass Start C	World Cup	3rd
2	2025–26	14 December 2025	Davos, Switzerland	10 km Individual F	World Cup	3rd
3	2025–26	29 December 2025	Toblach, Italy	10 km Individual C	Stage World Cup	1st
4	2025–26	1 January 2026	Toblach, Italy	20 km Pursuit C	Stage World Cup	2nd
5	2025–26	4 January 2026	Val di Fiemme, Italy	10 km Mass Start F	Stage World Cup	1st
6	2025–26	28 December 2025 – 4 January 2026	(Italy) Tour de Ski	Overall Standings	World Cup	2nd
7	2025–26	20 March 2026	(United States) Lake Placid, USA	10 km Individual C	World Cup	3rd

==== Team podiums ====
- 1 podium – (1 RL)

No.	Season	Date	Location	Race	Level	Place	Teammates
1	2023–24	21 January 2024	Oberhof, Germany	4 × 7.5 km Relay C/F	World Cup	3rd	Taugbøl / Tønseth / Krüger
