= Martin Løwstrøm Nyenget =

Norwegian cross-country skier (born 1992)

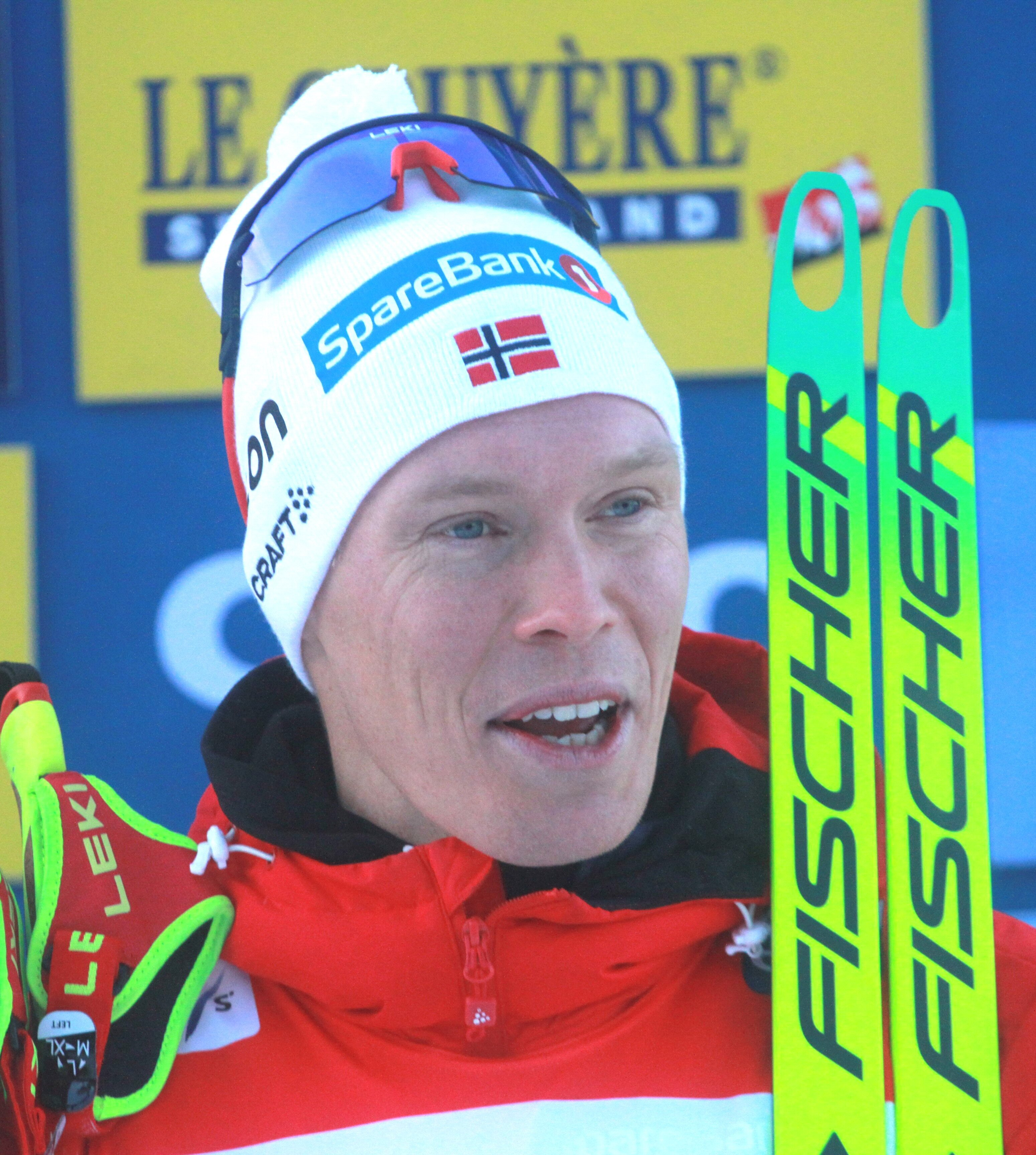
- Nyenget in 2025

Personal information
- Nationality: Norway
- Born: 1 April 1992 (age 34)

Sport
- Sport: Skiing
- Club: Lillehammer SK

World Cup career
- Seasons: 13 – (2014–present)
- Indiv. starts: 112
- Indiv. podiums: 28
- Indiv. wins: 7
- Team starts: 10
- Team podiums: 8
- Team wins: 2
- Overall titles: 0 – (5th in 2024)
- Discipline titles: 0
Medal record
Men's cross-country skiing
Representing Norway
Event	1st	2nd	3rd
Olympic Games	1	1	1
World Championships	1	1	0
Total	2	2	1
Olympic Games
Gold medal – first place	2026 Milano Cortina	4 × 7.5 km relay
Silver medal – second place	2026 Milano Cortina	50 km classical
Bronze medal – third place	2026 Milano Cortina	20 km skiathlon
World Championships
Gold medal – first place	2025 Trondheim	4 × 7.5 km relay
Silver medal – second place	2025 Trondheim	20 km skiathlon
Junior World Championships
Bronze medal – third place	2012 Erzurum	4 × 5 km relay
- Updated on 22 March 2026

Martin Løwstrøm Nyenget (born 1 April 1992) is a Norwegian cross-country skier.

He competed in four events at the 2012 Junior World Championships, winning a bronze medal in the relay. He later recorded two 6th places at the 2014 Junior World Championships and a fifth place at the 2015 Junior World Championships.

He made his World Cup debut in March 2014 in the Holmenkollen 50 km race, collecting his first World Cup points in March 2015 in Lahti with a shock fourth place. The next time he broke the top ten happened in February 2016, again in Lahti.

He represents the sports club Lillehammer SK.

== Cross-country skiing results ==
All results are sourced from the International Ski Federation (FIS).

=== Olympic Games ===
- 3 medals – (1 gold, 1 silver, 1 bronze)

Year	Age	10 km individual	20 km skiathlon	50 km mass start	Sprint	4 × 7.5 km relay	Team sprint
2026	33	5	Bronze	Silver	—	Gold	—

=== World Championships ===
- 2 medals – (1 gold, 1 silver)

Year	Age	10/15 km individual	20/30 km skiathlon	50 km mass start	Sprint	4 × 7.5/10 km relay	Team sprint
2023	30	—	—	5	—	—	—
2025	32	5	Silver	4	—	Gold	—

=== World Cup ===
==== Season standings ====
Season	Age	Discipline standings			Ski Tour standings				
Season	Age	Overall	Distance	Sprint	Nordic Opening	Tour de Ski	Ski Tour 2020	World Cup Final	Ski Tour Canada
2014	21	NC	NC	—	—	—	—N/a	—	—N/a
2015	22	91	52	—	—	—	—N/a	—N/a	—N/a
2016	23	53	30	66	—	—	—N/a	—N/a	—
2017	24	42	36	44	18	—	—N/a	—	—N/a
2018	25	NC	NC	—	—	—	—N/a	—	—N/a
2019	26	53	34	65	34	—	—N/a	—	—N/a
2020	27	18	18	46	—	DNF	5	—N/a	—N/a
2021	28	50	28	—	—	—	—N/a	—N/a	—N/a
2022	29	7	4	65	—N/a	12	—N/a	—N/a	—N/a
2023	30	18	6	NC	—N/a	DNF	—N/a	—N/a	—N/a
2024	31	5	4	NC	—N/a	4	—N/a	—N/a	—N/a
2025	32	9	2nd place, silver medalist(s)	—	—N/a	DNF	—N/a	—N/a	—N/a
2026	33	9	4	—	—N/a	—N/a	—N/a	—N/a	—N/a

==== Individual podiums ====
- 7 victories – (7 WC)
- 28 podiums – (26 WC, 2 SWC)

No.	Season	Date	Location	Race	Level	Place
1	2019–20	16 February 2020	Östersund, Sweden	15 km Pursuit C	Stage World Cup	3rd
2	2021–22	4 December 2021	Lillehammer, Norway	15 km Individual F	World Cup	3rd
3	2021–22	6 March 2022	Oslo, Norway	50 km Mass Start C	World Cup	1st
4	2022–23	26 November 2022	Rukatunturi, Finland	10 km Individual C	World Cup	3rd
5	2022–23	4 December 2022	Lillehammer, Norway	20 km Mass Start C	World Cup	3rd
6	2022–23	11 March 2023	Oslo, Norway	50 km Mass Start F	World Cup	3rd
7	2022–23	17 March 2023	Falun, Sweden	10 km Individual C	World Cup	2nd
8	2023–24	25 November 2023	Rukatunturi, Finland	10 km Individual C	World Cup	1st
9	2023–24	4 January 2024	Davos, Switzerland	20 km Pursuit C	Stage World Cup	3rd
10	2023–24	20 January 2024	Oberhof, Germany	20 km Mass Start C	World Cup	2nd
11	2023–24	2 March 2024	Lahti, Finland	20 km Individual C	World Cup	3rd
12	2023–24	10 March 2024	Oslo, Norway	50 km Mass Start C	World Cup	2nd
13	2023–24	16 March 2024	Falun, Sweden	10 km Individual C	World Cup	3rd
14	2023–24	17 March 2024	Falun, Sweden	20 km Mass Start F	World Cup	3rd
15	2024–25	29 November 2024	Rukatunturi, Finland	10 km Individual C	World Cup	3rd
16	2024–25	1 December 2024	Rukatunturi, Finland	20 km Mass Start F	World Cup	3rd
17	2024–25	6 December 2024	Lillehammer, Norway	10 km Individual F	World Cup	1st
18	2024–25	8 December 2024	Lillehammer, Norway	10 km + 10 km Skiathlon C/F	World Cup	3rd
19	2024–25	15 December 2024	Davos, Switzerland	20 km Individual C	World Cup	1st
20	2024–25	2 February 2025	Cogne, Italy	10 km Individual F	World Cup	3rd
21	2024–25	15 March 2025	Oslo, Norway	20 km Individual C	World Cup	1st
22	2024–25	23 March 2025	Lahti, Finland	50 km Mass Start C	World Cup	2nd
23	2025–26	28 November 2025	Rukatunturi, Finland	10 km Individual C	World Cup	1st
24	2025–26	7 December 2025	Trondheim, Norway	10 km Individual F	World Cup	3rd
25	2025–26	18 January 2026	Goms, Switzerland	10 km Individual C	World Cup	1st
26	2025–26	1 March 2026	Falun, Sweden	10 km + 10 km Skiathlon C/F	World Cup	3rd
27	2025–26	8 March 2026	Lahti, Finland	10 km Individual C	World Cup	2nd
28	2025–26	14 March 2026	Oslo, Norway	50 km Mass Start F	World Cup	3rd

==== Team podiums ====
- 2 victories – (2 RL)
- 8 podiums – (7 RL, 1 TS)

No.	Season	Date	Location	Race	Level	Place	Teammate(s)
1	2015–16	6 December 2015	Lillehammer, Norway	4 × 7.5 km Relay C/F	World Cup	2nd	Rundgreen / Sveen / Krogh
2	2021–22	5 December 2021	Lillehammer, Norway	4 × 7.5 km Relay C/F	World Cup	3rd	Golberg / Holund / Amundsen
3	2021–22	13 March 2022	Falun, Sweden	12 × 1 km Mixed Team Sprint F	World Cup	2nd	T. Udnes Weng
4	2022–23	11 December 2022	Beitostølen, Norway	4 × 5 km Mixed Relay C/F	World Cup	2nd	Kalvå / Weng / Iversen
5	2022–23	19 March 2023	Falun, Sweden	4 × 5 km Mixed Relay C/F	World Cup	2nd	Weng / Krüger / Kalvå
6	2023–24	3 December 2023	Gällivare, Sweden	4 × 7.5 km Relay C/F	World Cup	1st	Golberg / Krüger / Jenssen
7	2023–24	21 January 2024	Oberhof, Germany	4 × 7.5 km Relay C/F	World Cup	1st	Valnes / Golberg / Klæbo
8	2023–24	26 January 2024	Goms, Switzerland	4 × 5 km Mixed Relay C/F	World Cup	3rd	Bergane / Krüger / T. Udnes Weng
