= Johan Hoel =

Norwegian cross-country skier

Personal information
- Nationality: Norway
- Born: December 17, 1994 (age 31)

Sport
- Sport: Skiing
- Club: Åsen IL

World Cup career
- Seasons: 4 – (2015–2016, 2018–2019)
- Indiv. starts: 7
- Indiv. podiums: 0
- Team starts: 1
- Team podiums: 0
- Overall titles: 0 – (108th in 2018)
- Discipline titles: 0
Medal record
Men's cross-country skiing
Representing Norway
Junior World Championships
Gold medal – first place	2014 Val di Fiemme	4 × 5 km relay
Bronze medal – third place	2014 Val di Fiemme	20 km skiathlon
- Updated on 10 January 2020

Johan Hoel (born 17 December 1994) is a Norwegian cross-country skier.

== Overview ==
At the 2014 Junior World Championships he competed in four events, winning a gold medal in relay and the bronze medal in the 20 km skiathlon. He also competed at the 2016 and 2017 Junior World Championships, now in the U23 age class, with a 10th place as best.

He made his World Cup debut in March 2015 at the Holmenkollen 50 km, not finishing the race however. He collected his first World Cup points in the 2016 edition of the same race, finishing 18th. In the 2017–18 World Cup circuit he competed three times, managing a 13th place in Planica, but in 2018–19 he again only competed in the Holmenkollen 50 km, this time with a 16th place.

He represents the sports club Åsen IL, originally Frogner IL.

== Cross-country skiing results ==
All results are sourced from the International Ski Federation (FIS).

=== World Cup ===
==== Season standings ====
Season	Age	Discipline standings			Ski Tour standings			
Season	Age	Overall	Distance	Sprint	Nordic Opening	Tour de Ski	World Cup Final	Ski Tour Canada
2015	20	NC	NC	—	—	—	—N/a	—N/a
2016	21	117	70	—	—	—	—N/a	—
2018	23	108	75	—	—	—	—	—N/a
2019	24	114	78	—	—	—	—	—N/a
