= Anne Kjersti Kalvå =

Norwegian cross-country skier

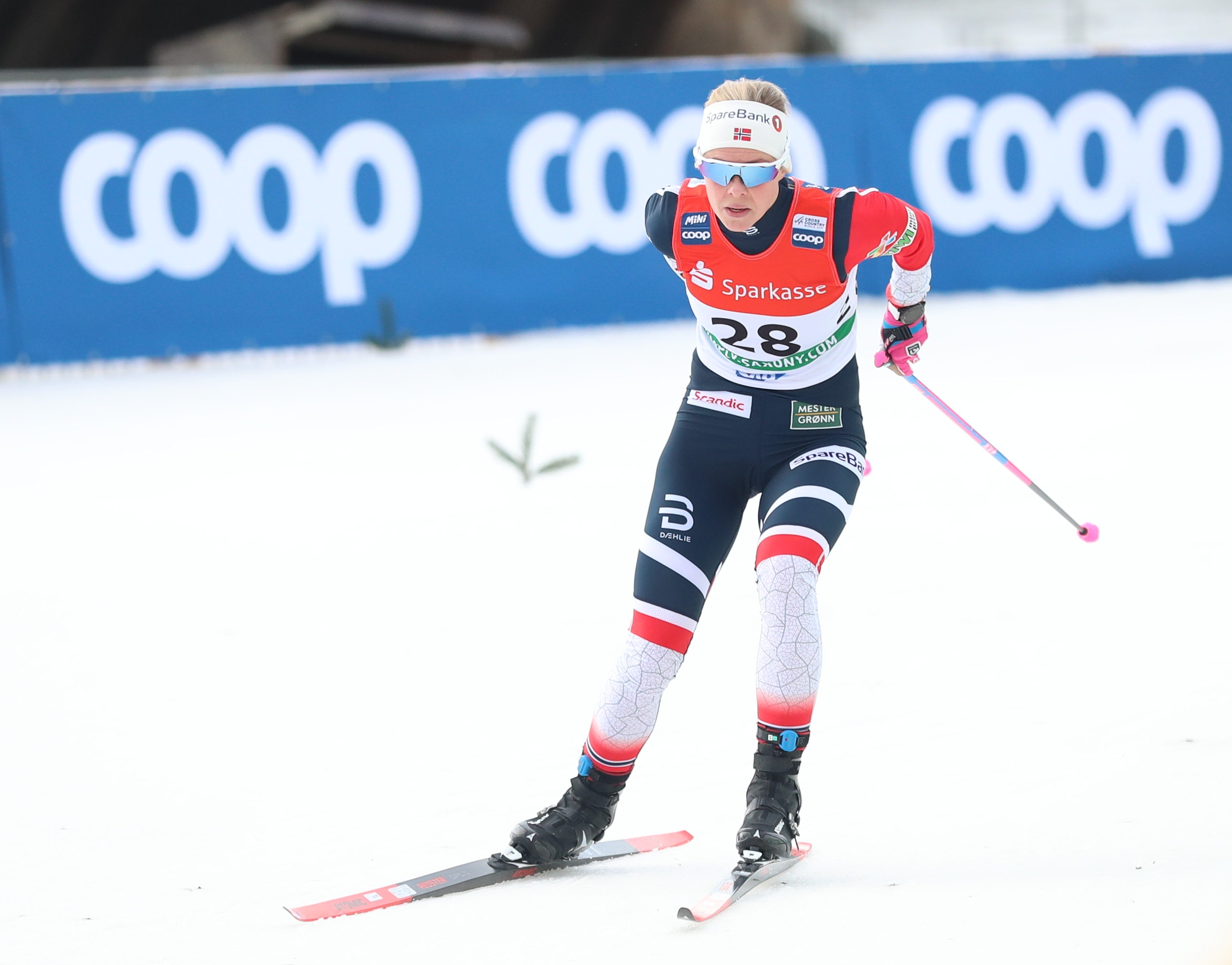
- Kalvå in January 2019

Personal information
- Nationality: Norway
- Born: 5 June 1992 (age 34) Lundamo, Norway

Sport
- Sport: Skiing
- Club: Lundamo IL

World Cup career
- Seasons: 11 – (2013, 2015–present)
- Indiv. starts: 96
- Indiv. podiums: 5
- Indiv. wins: 1
- Team starts: 8
- Team podiums: 4
- Team wins: 1
- Overall titles: 0 – (16th in 2023)
- Discipline titles: 0
Medal record
Women's cross-country skiing
Representing Norway
World Championships
Gold medal – first place	2023 Planica	4 × 5 km relay
Silver medal – second place	2023 Planica	30 km classical
Silver medal – second place	2023 Planica	Team sprint
- Updated on 17 March 2024

Anne Kjersti Kalvå (born 5 June 1992) is a Norwegian cross-country skier.

She competed at the 2012 Nordic Junior World Ski Championships, managing a 34th and 52nd place, also placing lowly at the 2014 Nordic U23 World Ski Championships, but ultimately recording a fifth and ninth place at the 2015 Nordic U23 World Ski Championships.

She made her World Cup debut in March 2013 in the sprint event in Drammen, ending 51st. She collected her first World Cup points with a 28th place in January 2017 in Toblach, and broke the top 20 for the first time with a 19th place in the 30 km event in Holmenkollen in March 2017. In the 2017–18 Tour de Ski she managed an eight place in the Oberstdorf leg of the tour, and a 22nd place overall. Another eight place followed in December 2019, in the sprint event in Davos.

She represents the sports club Lundamo IL.

== Cross-country skiing results ==
All results are sourced from the International Ski Federation (FIS).

=== World Championships ===
- 3 medals – (1 gold, 2 silver)

Year	Age	10 km individual	15 km skiathlon	30 km mass start	Sprint	4 × 5 km relay	Team sprint
2021	28	—	12	6	—	—	—
2023	30	4	8	Silver	—	Gold	Silver

=== World Cup ===
==== Season standings ====
Season	Age	Discipline standings				Ski Tour standings				
Season	Age	Overall	Distance	Sprint	U23	Nordic Opening	Tour de Ski	Ski Tour 2020	World Cup Final	Ski Tour Canada
2013	20	NC	—	NC	—N/a	—	—	—N/a	—	—N/a
2015	22	NC	NC	—	NC	—	—	—N/a	—N/a	—N/a
2016	23	NC	NC	—	—N/a	—	—	—N/a	—N/a	—
2017	24	95	72	81	—N/a	44	—	—N/a	—	—N/a
2018	25	50	46	48	—N/a	—	22	—N/a	—	—N/a
2019	26	68	64	43	—N/a	—	—	—N/a	—	—N/a
2020	27	26	25	26	—N/a	13	16	—	—N/a	—N/a
2021	28	31	29	45	—N/a	13	—	—N/a	—N/a	—N/a
2022	29	27	25	47	—N/a	—N/a	13	—N/a	—N/a	—N/a
2023	30	16	5	51	—N/a	—N/a	DNF	—N/a	—N/a	—N/a
2024	31	35	22	42	—N/a	—N/a	DNF	—N/a	—N/a	—N/a

==== Individual podiums ====
- 1 victory – (1 WC)
- 5 podiums – (4 WC, 1 SWC)

No.	Season	Date	Location	Race	Level	Place
1	2022–23	10 December 2022	Beitostølen, Norway	10 km Individual C	World Cup	2nd
2	2022–23	3 January 2023	Oberstdorf, Germany	10 km Individual C	Stage World Cup	3rd
3	2022–23	17 March 2023	Falun, Sweden	10 km Individual C	World Cup	3rd
4	2022–23	26 March 2023	Lahti, Finland	20 km Mass Start C	World Cup	1st
5	2023–24	17 March 2024	Falun, Sweden	20 km Mass Start F	World Cup	3rd

==== Team podiums ====
- 1 victory – (1 RL)
- 4 podiums – (3 RL, 1 TS)

No.	Season	Date	Location	Race	Level	Place	Teammate(s)
1	2022–23	11 December 2022	Beitostølen, Norway	4 × 5 km Mixed Relay C/F	World Cup	2nd	Nyenget / Weng / Iversen
2	2022–23	5 February 2023	Toblach, Italy	4 × 7.5 km Relay C/F	World Cup	1st	Weng / Østberg / Theodorsen
3	2022–23	19 March 2023	Falun, Sweden	4 × 5 km Mixed Relay C/F	World Cup	2nd	Nyenget / Weng / Krüger
4	2022–23	24 March 2023	Lahti, Finland	6 × 1.4 km Team Sprint F	World Cup	2nd	Myhre
