= FIS Nordic World Ski Championships 2023 =

Ski competition

- Host city: Planica
- Country: Slovenia
- Nations: 66
- Athletes: 2,000+
- Events: 24
- Opening: 21 February 2023
- Closing: 5 March 2023

The 43rd FIS Nordic World Ski Championships were held from 21 February to 5 March 2023 in Planica, Slovenia.

== Championships ==
Slovenia hosted the Nordic World Championships for the first time. All competitions took place at the Planica Nordic Centre, located in the Planica monument valley.

=== Host selection ===
The World Championships were awarded at the 51st FIS Congress, held between 13 and 19 May 2018 in Costa Navarino, Greece. Planica's bids to host the championships had been unsuccessful on three previous occasions.

The detailed application had to be submitted by 1 September 2017. On 17 May 2018, Planica was announced as the host, beating Norwegian Trondheim.

Place	1st ballot
Slovenia	9
Norway	6

=== Venues ===
- Bloudkova velikanka is a large hill (HS138), completely rebuilt in 2012 after the previous hill collapsed. A total of ten world records were set on the hill.
- Srednja skakalnica is a normal hill (HS102) standing right next to Bloudkova velikanka, and hosted events in ski jumping and Nordic combined.
- Rateče Planica track is a cross-country skiing track that stretches across the entire valley between Rateče and Planica.

Planica Nordic Centre
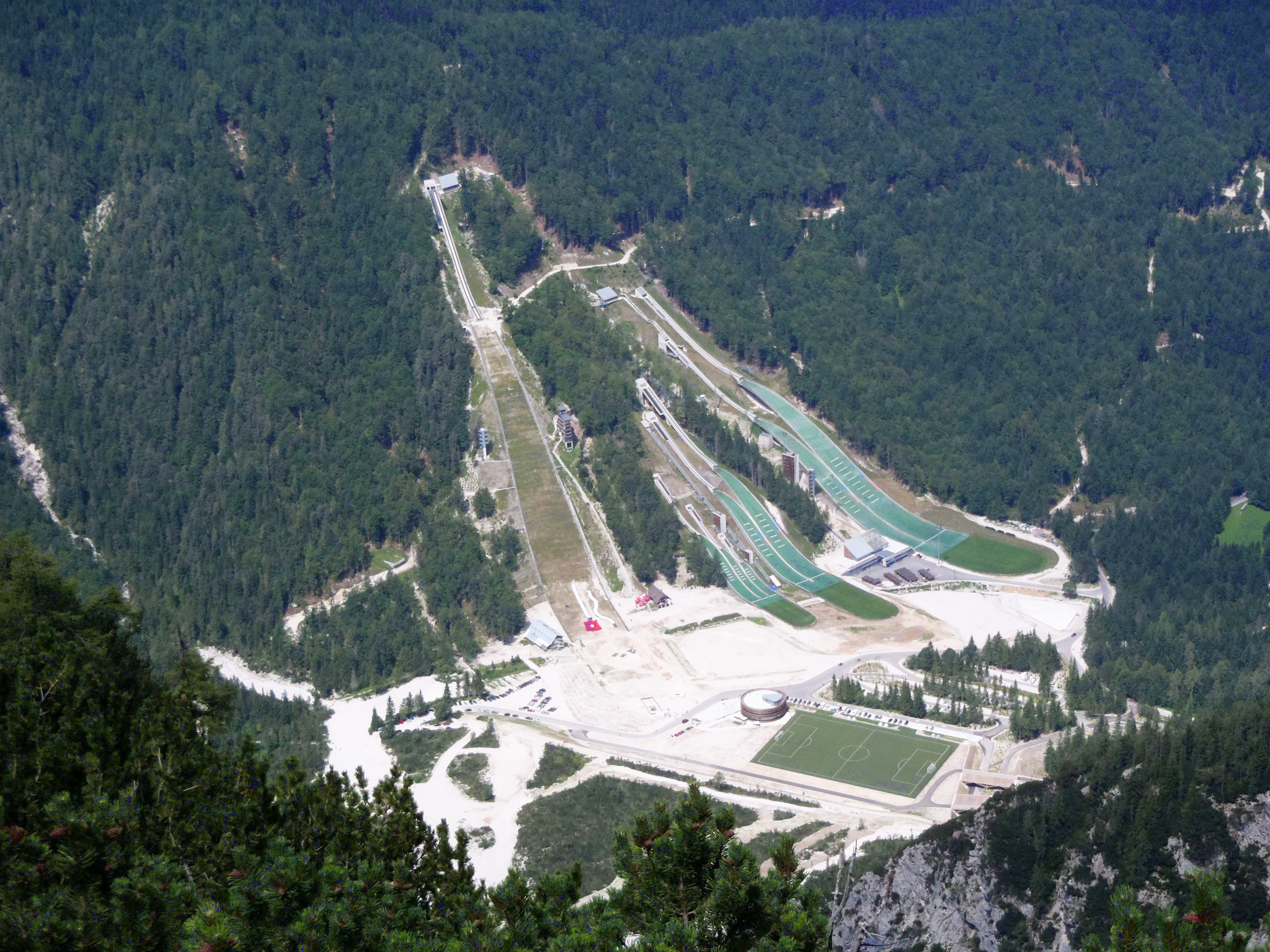

== Schedule ==
All times are local (UTC+1).

		February								March					Events
21st Tue	22nd Wed	23rd Thu	24th Fri	25th Sat	26th Sun	27th Mon	28th Tue	1st Wed	2nd Thu	3rd Fri	4th Sat	5th Sun			Events
Ceremonies		OC						D A Y O F F						CC	—
Ski jumping	Normal hill Individual		Q^{W}	W	Q^{M}	M		D A Y O F F							7
Ski jumping	Large hill Individual							D A Y O F F	Q^{W}	W	Q^{M}	M			7
Ski jumping	Team normal hill					W		D A Y O F F							7
Ski jumping	Team large hill							D A Y O F F					M		7
Ski jumping	Mixed team normal						M / W	D A Y O F F							7
Nordic combined	Normal hill Individual				W	M		D A Y O F F							5
Nordic combined	Mixed team normal						M / W	D A Y O F F							5
Nordic combined	Team large hill							D A Y O F F		M					5
Nordic combined	Large hill Individual							D A Y O F F					M		5
Cross-country	Free		Q^{W, M}					D A Y O F F							12
Cross-country	Sprint Classic			M, W				D A Y O F F							12
Cross-country	Skiathlon				M	W		D A Y O F F							12
Cross-country	Team Sprint Free						M, W	D A Y O F F							12
Cross-country	Individual Free							D A Y O F F	W	M					12
Cross-country	Relay							D A Y O F F			W	M			12
Cross-country	Mass start Classic							D A Y O F F					W	M	12

=== Ski jumping ===
Date	Time	Event
22 February	16:30	HS102 Individual, q (Women)
23 February	17:00	HS102 Individual (Women)
24 February	17:45	HS102 Individual, q (Men)
25 February	12:15	HS102 Team (Women)
25 February	17:30	HS102 Individual (Men)
26 February	17:30	HS102 Mixed team (M / W)
28 February	18:30	HS138 Individual, q (Women)
1 March	17:30	HS138 Individual (Women)
2 March	17:30	HS138 Individual, q (Men)
3 March	17:30	HS138 Individual (Men)
4 March	16:30	HS138 Team (Men)

=== Nordic combined ===
Date	Time	Event
24 February	11:30; 14:15	HS102 / 5 km Individual (Women)
25 February	10:00; 15:15	HS102 / 10 km Individual (Men)
26 February	10:30; 15:00	HS102 / 2×2.5 + 2×5 km (Mixed team)
1 March	11:00; 15:00	HS138 / 4 × 5 km Team (Men)
4 March	10:30; 15:00	HS138 / 10 km Individual (Men)

=== Cross-country ===
Date	Time	Event
22 February	12:30	Free 5 km, qualification (W)
22 February	13:30	Free 10 km, qualification (M)
23 February	12:00	Sprint Classic, qualification (M, W)
23 February	14:30	Sprint Classic, Final (M, W)
24 February	15:30	Skiathlon 2 × 15 km (M)
25 February	14:00	Skiathlon 2 × 7.5 km (W)
26 February	11:30	Team Sprint Free, qualification (M, W)
26 February	13:30	Team Sprint Free, Final (M, W)
28 February	12:30	10 km Free Individual (W)
1 March	12:30	15 km Free Individual (M)
2 March	12:30	4 × 5 km Classic/Free Relay (W)
3 March	12:30	4 × 10 km Classic/Free Relay (M)
4 March	12:00	30 km Mass start Classic (W)
5 March	12:00	50 km Mass start Classic (M)

== Participating nations ==
Over 2,000 athletes from 66 countries participated at the Championships.

- Andorra
- Argentina
- Armenia
- Australia
- Austria
- Belgium
- Bolivia
- Bosnia and Herzegovina
- Brazil
- Bulgaria
- Canada
- Chile
- China
- Chinese Taipei
- Colombia
- Croatia
- Czech Republic
- Dominica
- Ecuador
- Estonia
- Finland
- France
- Georgia
- Germany
- Great Britain
- Greece
- Haiti
- Hungary
- Iceland
- India
- Iran
- Ireland
- Israel
- Italy
- Japan
- Kazakhstan
- Kyrgyzstan
- Latvia
- Lebanon
- Liechtenstein
- Lithuania
- Mexico
- Mongolia
- Montenegro
- Morocco
- Nigeria
- North Macedonia
- Norway
- Panama
- Peru
- Poland
- Portugal
- Romania
- Saudi Arabia
- Serbia
- Slovakia
- Slovenia
- Spain
- Sweden
- Switzerland
- Thailand
- Trinidad and Tobago
- Turkey
- Ukraine
- United States
- Venezuela

== Medal summary ==
=== Medal table ===
* Host nation (Slovenia)

Rank	Nation	Gold	Silver	Bronze	Total
1	Norway	12	10	5	27
2	Sweden	4	3	5	12
3	Germany	3	6	3	12
4	Slovenia*	2	0	1	3
5	Poland	1	0	1	2
5	United States	1	0	1	2
7	Canada	1	0	0	1
8	Austria	0	2	5	7
9	Japan	0	1	1	2
10	Finland	0	1	0	1
10	Italy	0	1	0	1
12	France	0	0	2	2
Totals (12 entries)		24	24	24	72

=== Cross-country skiing ===
==== Men ====
Event	Gold		Silver		Bronze	
Sprint classical	Johannes Høsflot Klæbo; Norway	2:56.07	Pål Golberg; Norway	2:58.29	Jules Chappaz; France	2:58.31
30 kilometre skiathlon	Simen Hegstad Krüger; Norway	1:09:40.3	Johannes Høsflot Klæbo; Norway	1:09:52.5	Sjur Røthe; Norway	1:09:54.4
Team sprint freestyle	Norway; Pål Golberg; Johannes Høsflot Klæbo	17:28.14	Italy; Francesco De Fabiani; Federico Pellegrino	17:30.62	France; Renaud Jay; Richard Jouve	17:44.62
15 kilometre freestyle individual	Simen Hegstad Krüger; Norway	32:17.4	Harald Østberg Amundsen; Norway	32:22.7	Hans Christer Holund; Norway	32:42.0
4 × 10 kilometre relay	Norway; Hans Christer Holund; Pål Golberg; Simen Hegstad Krüger; Johannes Høsflot Klæbo	1:32:54.7	Finland; Ristomatti Hakola; Iivo Niskanen; Perttu Hyvärinen; Niko Anttola	1:33:41.6	Germany; Albert Kuchler; Janosch Brugger; Jonas Dobler; Friedrich Moch	1:33:54.5
50 kilometre classical mass start	Pål Golberg; Norway	2:01:30.2	Johannes Høsflot Klæbo; Norway	2:01:31.2	William Poromaa; Sweden	2:01:31.4

==== Women ====
Event	Gold		Silver		Bronze	
Sprint classical	Jonna Sundling; Sweden	3:21.67	Emma Ribom; Sweden	3:22.54	Maja Dahlqvist; Sweden	3:26.12
15 kilometre skiathlon	Ebba Andersson; Sweden	38:11.8	Frida Karlsson; Sweden	38:33.8	Astrid Øyre Slind; Norway	38:59.8
Team sprint freestyle	Sweden; Emma Ribom; Jonna Sundling	19:40.73	Norway; Anne Kjersti Kalvå; Tiril Udnes Weng	19:43.15	United States; Jessie Diggins; Julia Kern	19:46.06
10 kilometre freestyle individual	Jessie Diggins; United States	23:40.8	Frida Karlsson; Sweden	23:54.8	Ebba Andersson; Sweden	24:00.3
4 × 5 kilometre relay	Norway; Tiril Udnes Weng; Astrid Øyre Slind; Ingvild Flugstad Østberg; Anne Kjersti Kalvå	50:33.3	Germany; Laura Gimmler; Katharina Hennig; Pia Fink; Victoria Carl	50:53.8	Sweden; Emma Ribom; Ebba Andersson; Frida Karlsson; Maja Dahlqvist	51:02.0
30 kilometre classical mass start	Ebba Andersson; Sweden	1:22:18.0	Anne Kjersti Kalvå; Norway	1:23:11.0	Frida Karlsson; Sweden	1:23:12.2

=== Nordic combined ===
==== Men ====
Event	Gold		Silver		Bronze	
Individual large hill/10 km	Jarl Magnus Riiber; Norway	23:42.6	Jens Lurås Oftebro; Norway	24:44.0	Johannes Lamparter; Austria	24:47.3
Team large hill/4 × 5 km	Norway; Espen Andersen; Jens Lurås Oftebro; Jørgen Graabak; Jarl Magnus Riiber	47:20.4	Germany; Eric Frenzel; Vinzenz Geiger; Johannes Rydzek; Julian Schmid	47:29.4	Austria; Martin Fritz; Lukas Greiderer; Stefan Rettenegger; Johannes Lamparter	47:29.7
Individual normal hill/10 km	Jarl Magnus Riiber; Norway	24:36.3	Julian Schmid; Germany	24:55.7	Franz-Josef Rehrl; Austria	24:57.3

==== Women ====
Event	Gold		Silver		Bronze	
Individual normal hill/5 km	Gyda Westvold Hansen; Norway	14:27.1	Nathalie Armbruster; Germany	14:38.6	Haruka Kasai; Japan	14:42.8

==== Mixed ====
Event	Gold		Silver		Bronze	
Mixed team normal hill	Norway; Jens Lurås Oftebro; Ida Marie Hagen; Gyda Westvold Hansen; Jarl Magnus Riiber	37:38.2	Germany; Vinzenz Geiger; Jenny Nowak; Nathalie Armbruster; Julian Schmid	38:26.0	Austria; Stefan Rettenegger; Annalena Slamik; Lisa Hirner; Johannes Lamparter	38:38.2

=== Ski jumping ===
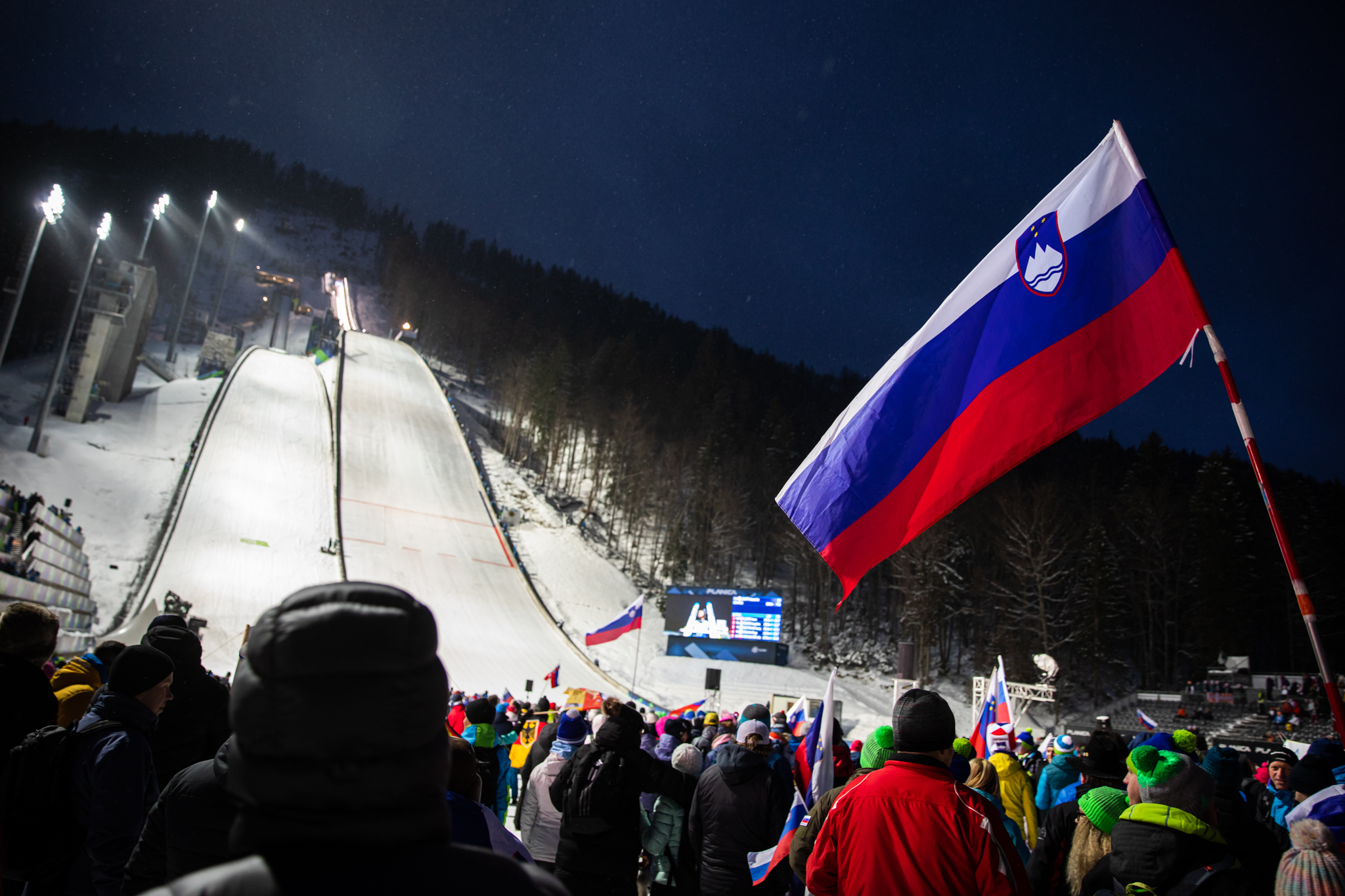
Ski jumping venue

==== Men ====
Event	Gold		Silver		Bronze	
Men's individual normal hill	Piotr Żyła; Poland	261.8	Andreas Wellinger; Germany	259.2	Karl Geiger; Germany	257.7
Men's individual large hill	Timi Zajc; Slovenia	287.5	Ryōyū Kobayashi; Japan	276.8	Dawid Kubacki; Poland	276.2
Men's team large hill	Slovenia; Lovro Kos; Žiga Jelar; Timi Zajc; Anže Lanišek	1178.9	Norway; Johann André Forfang; Kristoffer Eriksen Sundal; Marius Lindvik; Halvor Egner Granerud	1166.0	Austria; Daniel Tschofenig; Michael Hayböck; Jan Hörl; Stefan Kraft	1139.4

==== Women ====
Event	Gold		Silver		Bronze	
Women's individual normal hill	Katharina Althaus; Germany	249.1	Eva Pinkelnig; Austria	246.9	Anna Odine Strøm; Norway	246.0
Women's individual large hill	Alexandria Loutitt; Canada	264.4	Maren Lundby; Norway	254.0	Katharina Althaus; Germany	245.9
Women's team normal hill	Germany; Anna Rupprecht; Luisa Görlich; Selina Freitag; Katharina Althaus	843.8	Austria; Chiara Kreuzer; Julia Mühlbacher; Jacqueline Seifriedsberger; Eva Pinkelnig	831.1	Norway; Maren Lundby; Eirin Maria Kvandal; Thea Minyan Bjørseth; Anna Odine Strøm	828.6

==== Mixed ====
Event	Gold		Silver		Bronze	
Mixed team normal hill	Germany; Selina Freitag; Karl Geiger; Katharina Althaus; Andreas Wellinger	1017.2	Norway; Anna Odine Strøm; Johann André Forfang; Thea Minyan Bjørseth; Halvor Egner Granerud	1004.5	Slovenia; Nika Križnar; Timi Zajc; Ema Klinec; Anže Lanišek	1000.4
