= 2025–26 Tour de Ski =

20th edition of the Tour de Ski

Tour de Ski
2025–26 FIS Cross-Country World Cup

Ski tour details
- Venue(s): Toblach, Italy; Val di Fiemme, Italy
- Dates: 28 December 2025 – 4 January 2026
- Stages: 6

Results
Men
| Jersey awarded to the men's overall winner | Winner | Johannes Høsflot Klæbo (NOR) |
| | Second | Mattis Stenshagen (NOR) |
| | Third | Harald Østberg Amundsen (NOR) |
| Jersey awarded to the men's sprint classification winner | Sprint | Johannes Høsflot Klæbo (NOR) |
| Jersey awarded to the men's climbing classification winner | Climbing | Mattis Stenshagen (NOR) |
Women
| Jersey awarded to the women's overall winner | Winner | Jessie Diggins (USA) |
| | Second | Teresa Stadlober (AUT) |
| | Third | Heidi Weng (NOR) |
| Jersey awarded to the women's sprint classification winner | Sprint | Maja Dahlqvist (SWE) |
| Jersey awarded to the women's climbing classification winner | Climbing | Teresa Stadlober (AUT) |

The 2025–26 Tour de Ski was the 20th edition of the Tour de Ski and part of the 2025–26 FIS Cross-Country World Cup. The World Cup stage event started in Toblach, Italy on 28 December 2025 and concluded with the traditional Final Climb stage in Val di Fiemme, Italy, on 4 January 2026. The tour started in Toblach for the fourth time.

Norwegians Johannes Høsflot Klæbo and retired Therese Johaug were the winners of previous edition.

Johannes Høsflot Klæbo defended the title and reached his fifth overall victory in the Tour de Ski, more than any other skier. American Jessie Diggins won the Tour on the women's field, which was her third title.

== Schedule ==
| Stage | Venue | Date | Event | Technique | Distance | Start time (CET) | |
| Stage | Venue | Date | Event | Technique | Distance | Women | Men |
|---|---|---|---|---|---|---|---|
| 1 | (Italy) Toblach | 28 December 2025 | Sprint | Free | 1.4 km | 14:15 | 14:15 |
| 2 | (Italy) Toblach | 29 December 2025 | Distance, individual | Classic | 10 km | 14:45 | 11:45 |
| 3 | (Italy) Toblach | 31 December 2025 | Distance, heat mass start | Free | 5 km | 14:30 | 11:30 |
| 4 | (Italy) Toblach | 1 January 2026 | Distance, pursuit | Classic | 20 km | 12:30 | 10:30 |
| 5 | (Italy) Val di Fiemme | 3 January 2026 | Sprint | Classic | 1.5 km | 14:45 | 14:45 |
| 6 | (Italy) Val di Fiemme | 4 January 2026 | Final Climb, mass start | Free | 10 km | 15:30 | 11:30 |

== Overall leadership ==
Three main individual classifications were contested in the 2025–26 Tour de Ski, as well as a team competition. The most important was the overall standings, calculated by adding each skier's finishing times on each stage. Time bonuses (time subtracted) were awarded at both sprint stages, where the winners were awarded 60 bonus seconds. The skier with the lowest cumulative time was the overall winner of the Tour de Ski. For the third time in Tour history, the skier leading the overall standings wore a gold bib.

Bonus seconds for the top 30 positions by type
| Type | | 1 | 2 | 3 | 4 | 5 | 6 | 7 | 8 | 9 | 10 | 11 | 12 | 13–15 | 16–20 | 21–25 | 26–30 |
In finish
| In finish | Sprint | 60 | 54 | 48 | 46 | 44 | 42 | 32 | 30 | 28 | 26 | 24 | 22 | 10 | 8 | 6 | 4 |
| In finish | Interval start | none | | | | | | | | | | | | | | | |
| In finish | Pursuit | none | | | | | | | | | | | | | | | |
| In finish | Mass start | none | | | | | | | | | | | | | | | |

The second competition was the sprints standings. The skiers who received the highest number of points during the Tour won the sprint classification. The points available for each stage finish were determined by the stage's type. The leader was identified by a silver bib.

Sprint standings points for the top 10 positions by type
| Type | | 1 | 2 | 3 | 4 | 5 | 6 | 7 | 8 | 9 | 10 |
|---|---|---|---|---|---|---|---|---|---|---|---|
| In finish | Sprint | 30 | 24 | 20 | 16 | 12 | 10 | 8 | 6 | 4 | 2 |
| Intermediate sprint | Mass start | 15 | 12 | 10 | 8 | 6 | 5 | 4 | 3 | 2 | 1 |
| Intermediate sprint | Heat mass start | 5 | 3 | 2 | | | | | | | |

The third competition was the new competition called climbing standings. The skiers who received the highest number of points on the top of the hills during the Tour won the climbing classification. The points available for each stage finish were determined by the stage's type. The leader was identified by a violet bib.

Climbing standings points for the top 10 positions by type
| Type | | 1 | 2 | 3 | 4 | 5 | 6 | 7 | 8 | 9 | 10 |
|---|---|---|---|---|---|---|---|---|---|---|---|
| In finish | Stage 6 (Alpe Cermis) | 30 | 24 | 20 | 16 | 12 | 10 | 8 | 6 | 4 | 2 |
| Intermediate sprint | Interval start | 15 | 12 | 10 | 8 | 6 | 5 | 4 | 3 | 2 | 1 |
| Intermediate sprint | Heat mass start | 5 | 3 | 2 | | | | | | | |

The final competition was a team competition. This was calculated using the finishing times of the best two skiers of both genders per team on each stage; the leading team was the team with the lowest cumulative time.

Classification leadership by stage
| Stage | Men | | | | Women | | | |
| Stage | Winner | Overall standings | Sprint standings | Climbing standings | Winner | Overall standings | Sprint standings | Climbing standings |
|---|---|---|---|---|---|---|---|---|
| 1 | Johannes Høsflot Klæbo | Johannes Høsflot Klæbo | Johannes Høsflot Klæbo | – | Kristine Stavås Skistad | Kristine Stavås Skistad | Kristine Stavås Skistad | – |
| 2 | Mattis Stenshagen | Johannes Høsflot Klæbo | Johannes Høsflot Klæbo | Mattis Stenshagen | Astrid Øyre Slind | Jessie Diggins | Kristine Stavås Skistad | Astrid Øyre Slind |
| 3 | Gus Schumacher | Johannes Høsflot Klæbo | Johannes Høsflot Klæbo | Mattis Stenshagen | Jessie Diggins | Jessie Diggins | Kristine Stavås Skistad | Astrid Øyre Slind |
| 4 | Johannes Høsflot Klæbo | Johannes Høsflot Klæbo | Johannes Høsflot Klæbo | Mattis Stenshagen | Jessie Diggins | Jessie Diggins | Kristine Stavås Skistad | Frida Karlsson |
| 5 | Johannes Høsflot Klæbo | Johannes Høsflot Klæbo | Johannes Høsflot Klæbo | Mattis Stenshagen | Jasmi Joensuu | Jessie Diggins | Maja Dahlqvist | Frida Karlsson |
| 6 | Mattis Stenshagen | Johannes Høsflot Klæbo | Johannes Høsflot Klæbo | Mattis Stenshagen | Karoline Simpson-Larsen | Jessie Diggins | Maja Dahlqvist | Teresa Stadlober |
| Final | | Johannes Høsflot Klæbo | Johannes Høsflot Klæbo | Mattis Stenshagen | Final | Jessie Diggins | Maja Dahlqvist | Teresa Stadlober |

== Standings ==
Legend
| Denotes the leader of the Overall standings | Denotes the leader of the Sprint standings | Denotes the leader of the Climbing standings |

=== Overall standings ===
==== Men ====
Final overall standings (1–10)
| Rank | Name | Time |
|---|---|---|
| 1 | Johannes Høsflot Klæbo (NOR) | 1:56:12.4 |
| 2 | Mattis Stenshagen (NOR) | +30.1 |
| 3 | Harald Østberg Amundsen (NOR) | +1:08.2 |
| 4 | Federico Pellegrino (ITA) | +1:27.6 |
| 5 | Emil Iversen (NOR) | +1:30.5 |
| 6 | Lars Heggen (NOR) | +2:10.6 |
| 7 | Gus Schumacher (USA) | +2:17.0 |
| 8 | Savelii Korostelev (AIN) | +2:28.5 |
| 9 | Elia Barp (ITA) | +2:34.8 |
| 10 | Benjamin Moser (AUT) | +2:44.9 |

Final overall standings (11–20)
| Rank | Name | Time |
|---|---|---|
| 11 | Antoine Cyr (CAN) | +2:51.8 |
| 12 | Edvin Anger (SWE) | +2:58.1 |
| 13 | Jules Chappaz (FRA) | +3:02.7 |
| 14 | Hugo Lapalus (FRA) | +3:03.8 |
| 15 | Andrew Musgrave (GBR) | +3:11.7 |
| 16 | Joe Davies (GBR) | +3:49.1 |
| 17 | Théo Schely (FRA) | +3:52.2 |
| 18 | Andreas Fjorden Ree (NOR) | +3:53.0 |
| 19 | Truls Gisselman (SWE) | +3:55.4 |
| 20 | Perttu Hyvärinen (FIN) | +3:57.7 |

==== Women ====
Final overall standings (1–10)
| Rank | Name | Time |
|---|---|---|
| 1 | Jessie Diggins (USA) | 2:11:26.1 |
| 2 | Teresa Stadlober (AUT) | +2:17.7 |
| 3 | Heidi Weng (NOR) | +2:31.6 |
| 4 | Ebba Andersson (SWE) | +2:41.1 |
| 5 | Julie Bjervig Drivenes (NOR) | +3:30.0 |
| 6 | Johanna Matintalo (FIN) | +3:32.3 |
| 7 | Karoline Simpson-Larsen (NOR) | +4:02.2 |
| 8 | Moa Ilar (SWE) | +4:21.0 |
| 9 | Jasmi Joensuu (FIN) | +4:36.1 |
| 10 | Dariya Nepryaeva (AIN) | +4:55.5 |

Final overall standings (11–20)
| Rank | Name | Time |
|---|---|---|
| 11 | Moa Lundgren (SWE) | +4:59.7 |
| 12 | Alison Mackie (CAN) | +5:34.7 |
| 13 | Helen Hoffmann (GER) | +5:43.0 |
| 14 | Maja Dahlqvist (SWE) | +5:44.5 |
| 15 | Nora Sanness (NOR) | +5:46.2 |
| 16 | Julia Kern (USA) | +5:52.2 |
| 17 | Caterina Ganz (ITA) | +5:56.7 |
| 18 | Anja Weber (SUI) | +5:58.3 |
| 19 | Katherine Sauerbrey (GER) | +6:32.8 |
| 20 | Vilma Ryytty (FIN) | +6:35.8 |

=== Sprint standings ===
==== Men ====
Overall sprint standings (1–10)
| Rank | Name | Points |
|---|---|---|
| 1 | Johannes Høsflot Klæbo (NOR) | 73 |
| 2 | Lars Heggen (NOR) | 43 |
| 3 | Harald Østberg Amundsen (NOR) | 31 |
| 4 | Jules Chappaz (FRA) | 24 |
| 5 | Anton Grahn (SWE) | 20 |
| 6 | Edvin Anger (SWE) | 19 |
| 7 | Lucas Chanavat (FRA) | 15 |
| 8 | Emil Iversen (NOR) | 13 |
| 9 | Jan Stölben (GER) | 10 |
| 10 | Gus Schumacher (USA) | 9 |

==== Women ====
Overall sprint standings (1–10)
| Rank | Name | Points |
|---|---|---|
| 1 | Maja Dahlqvist (SWE) | 53 |
| 2 | Nadine Fähndrich (SUI) | 47 |
| 3 | Johanna Hagström (SWE) | 45 |
| 4 | Jessie Diggins (USA) | 32 |
| 5 | Jasmi Joensuu (FIN) | 30 |
| 6 | Johanna Matintalo (FIN) | 12 |
| 7 | Anja Weber (SUI) | 10 |
| 8 | Moa Lundgren (SWE) | 10 |
| 9 | Moa Ilar (SWE) | 8 |
| 10 | Ebba Andersson (SWE) | 6 |

=== Climbing standings ===
==== Men ====
Overall climbing standings (1–10)
| Rank | Name | Points |
|---|---|---|
| 1 | Mattis Stenshagen (NOR) | 63 |
| 2 | Emil Iversen (NOR) | 36 |
| 3 | Harald Østberg Amundsen (NOR) | 29 |
| 4 | Jules Lapierre (FRA) | 24 |
| 5 | Saveliy Korostelev (AIN) | 24 |
| 6 | Johannes Høsflot Klæbo (NOR) | 20 |
| 7 | Joe Davies (GBR) | 15 |
| 8 | Federico Pellegrino (ITA) | 13 |
| 9 | Simen Hegstad Krüger (NOR) | 8 |
| 10 | Lars Heggen (NOR) | 5 |

==== Women ====
Overall climbing standings (1–10)
| Rank | Name | Points |
|---|---|---|
| 1 | Teresa Stadlober (AUT) | 45 |
| 2 | Jessie Diggins (USA) | 39 |
| 3 | Karoline Simpson-Larsen (NOR) | 35 |
| 4 | Heidi Weng (NOR) | 24 |
| 5 | Ebba Andersson (SWE) | 17 |
| 6 | Julie Bjervig Drivenes (NOR) | 11 |
| 7 | Dariya Nepryaeva (AIN) | 10 |
| 8 | Moa Ilar (SWE) | 9 |
| 9 | Johanna Matintalo (FIN) | 8 |
| 10 | Nora Sanness (NOR) | 8 |

=== Team standings ===
Overall team standings (1–5)
| Rank | Nation | Time |
|---|---|---|
| 1 | Norway | 8:14:39.4 |
| 2 | Sweden | +9:01.1 |
| 3 | Finland | +12:04.6 |
| 4 | United States | +13:06.5 |
| 5 | Germany | +18:31.1 |

== Stages ==
=== Stage 1 ===
28 December 2025, Toblach, Italy

- Bonus seconds to the 30 skiers that qualifies for the quarter-finals, distributed as following:
  - Final: 60–54–48–46–44–42
  - Semi-final: 32–30–28–26–24–22
  - Quarter-final: 10–10–10–8–8–8–8–8–6–6–6–6–6–4–4–4–4–4

Men – 1.4 km Sprint Free
| Rank | Name | QT | Time | BS |
|---|---|---|---|---|
| 1 | Johannes Høsflot Klæbo (NOR) | 2:27.15 (1) | 2:28.82 | 60 |
| 2 | Lars Heggen (NOR) | 2:29.56 (6) | +0.13 | 54 |
| 3 | Oskar Opstad Vike (NOR) | 2:29.07 (3) | +0.80 | 48 |
| 4 | Valerio Grond (SUI) | 2:29.22 (5) | +1.28 | 46 |
| 5 | Lucas Chanavat (FRA) | 2:29.21 (4) | +2.52 | 44 |
| 6 | Jannik Riebli (SUI) | 2:30.04 (7) | +10.43 | 42 |
| 7 | Harald Østberg Amundsen (NOR) | 2:30.55 (10) | SF | 32 |
| 8 | Benjamin Moser (AUT) | 2:30.95 (15) | SF | 30 |
| 9 | Ansgar Evensen (NOR) | 2:30.32 (8) | SF | 28 |
| 10 | Edvin Anger (SWE) | 2:31.13 (17) | SF | 26 |

Women – 1.4 km Sprint Free
| Rank | Name | QT | Time | BS |
|---|---|---|---|---|
| 1 | Kristine Stavås Skistad (NOR) | 2:50.76 (6) | 2:49.79 | 60 |
| 2 | Coletta Rydzek (GER) | 2:49.58 (2) | +0.24 | 54 |
| 3 | Maja Dahlqvist (SWE) | 2:53.82 (17) | +0.35 | 48 |
| 4 | Jessie Diggins (USA) | 2:49.87 (4) | +1.32 | 46 |
| 5 | Johanna Hagström (SWE) | 2:47.58 (1) | +16.70 | 44 |
| 6 | Mathilde Myhrvold (NOR) | 2:50.29 (5) | +1:20.97 | 42 |
| 7 | Nadine Fähndrich (SUI) | 2:51.08 (8) | SF | 32 |
| 8 | Moa Ilar (SWE) | 2:53.80 (16) | SF | 30 |
| 9 | Moa Lundgren (SWE) | 2:50.84 (7) | SF | 28 |
| 10 | Federica Cassol (ITA) | 2:52.91 (14) | SF | 26 |

=== Stage 2 ===
29 December 2025, Toblach, Italy

- No bonus seconds are awarded on this stage.

Men – 10 km Individual Classic
| Rank | Name | Time |
|---|---|---|
| 1 | Mattis Stenshagen (NOR) | 22:11.0 |
| 2 | Johannes Høsflot Klæbo (NOR) | +8.9 |
| 3 | Emil Iversen (NOR) | +10.1 |
| 4 | Iivo Niskanen (FIN) | +24.3 |
| 5 | Edvin Anger (SWE) | +29.3 |
| 6 | Erik Valnes (NOR) | +30.7 |
| 7 | Harald Østberg Amundsen (NOR) | +34.4 |
| 8 | Elia Barp (ITA) | +39.2 |
| 9 | Saveliy Korostelev (AIN) | +39.6 |
| 10 | Federico Pellegrino (ITA) | +42.7 |

Women – 10 km Individual Classic
| Rank | Name | Time |
|---|---|---|
| 1 | Astrid Øyre Slind (NOR) | 25:33.7 |
| 2 | Teresa Stadlober (AUT) | +7.0 |
| 3 | Jessie Diggins (USA) | +8.8 |
| 4 | Kerttu Niskanen (FIN) | +33.2 |
| 5 | Frida Karlsson (SWE) | +35.7 |
| 6 | Moa Ilar (SWE) | +41.5 |
| 7 | Johanna Matintalo (FIN) | +43.7 |
| 8 | Heidi Weng (NOR) | +46.9 |
| 9 | Ebba Andersson (SWE) | +52.9 |
| 10 | Katharina Hennig Dotzler (GER) | +53.8 |

=== Stage 3 ===
31 December 2025, Toblach, Italy

- No bonus seconds are awarded on this stage. New format.

Men – 5 km Heat Mass Start Free
| Rank | Name | Time |
|---|---|---|
| 1 | Gus Schumacher (USA) | 9:35.4 |
| 2 | Benjamin Moser (AUT) | +0.2 |
| 3 | Lars Heggen (NOR) | +0.6 |
| 4 | Jules Chappaz (FRA) | +0.7 |
| 5 | James Clugnet (GBR) | +0.7 |
| 6 | Michal Novák (CZE) | +5.4 |
| 7 | Niilo Moilanen (FIN) | +6.0 |
| 8 | Emil Iversen (NOR) | +7.1 |
| 9 | Andreas Fjorden Ree (NOR) | +7.2 |
| 10 | Richard Jouve (FRA) | +8.4 |

Women – 5 km Heat Mass Start Free
| Rank | Name | Time |
|---|---|---|
| 1 | Jessie Diggins (USA) | 10:51.2 |
| 2 | Emma Ribom (SWE) | +5.5 |
| 3 | Moa Ilar (SWE) | +6.9 |
| 4 | Léonie Perry (FRA) | +7.5 |
| 5 | Alison Mackie (CAN) | +8.3 |
| 6 | Eliza Rucka-Michałek (POL) | +8.6 |
| 7 | Ebba Andersson (SWE) | +9.0 |
| 8 | Dariya Nepryaeva (AIN) | +9.1 |
| 9 | Maja Dahlqvist (SWE) | +9.8 |
| 10 | Julia Kern (USA) | +10.7 |

=== Stage 4 ===
1 January 2026, Toblach, Italy

- Start times based on general classification
- No bonus seconds are awarded on this stage.

Men – 20 km Pursuit Classic
| Rank | Name | Time |
|---|---|---|
| 1 | Johannes Høsflot Klæbo (NOR) | 46:01.7 |
| 2 | Mattis Stenshagen (NOR) | +51.1 |
| 3 | Edvin Anger (SWE) | +59.8 |
| 4 | Federico Pellegrino (ITA) | +59.8 |
| 5 | Emil Iversen (NOR) | +1:00.2 |
| 6 | Gus Schumacher (USA) | +1:00.2 |
| 7 | Lars Heggen (NOR) | +1:00.3 |
| 8 | Benjamin Moser (AUT) | +1:00.8 |
| 9 | Harald Østberg Amundsen (NOR) | +1:03.1 |
| 10 | Iivo Niskanen (FIN) | +1:53.6 |

Women – 20 km Pursuit Classic
| Rank | Name | Time |
|---|---|---|
| 1 | Jessie Diggins (USA) | 52:14.8 |
| 2 | Moa Ilar (SWE) | +1:35.2 |
| 3 | Teresa Stadlober (AUT) | +1:35.5 |
| 4 | Jasmi Joensuu (FIN) | +1:54.3 |
| 5 | Heidi Weng (NOR) | +1:55.0 |
| 6 | Johanna Matintalo (FIN) | +1:55.5 |
| 7 | Kerttu Niskanen (FIN) | +1:56.3 |
| 8 | Ebba Andersson (SWE) | +1:58.9 |
| 9 | Julie Bjervig Drivenes (NOR) | +2:07.2 |
| 10 | Frida Karlsson (SWE) | +2:50.5 |

=== Stage 5 ===
3 January 2026, Val di Fiemme, Italy

- Bonus seconds to the 30 skiers that qualifies for the quarter-finals, distributed as following:
  - Final: 60–54–48–46–44–42
  - Semi-final: 32–30–28–26–24–22
  - Quarter-final: 10–10–10–8–8–8–8–8–6–6–6–6–6–4–4–4–4–4

Men – 1.5 km Sprint Classic
| Rank | Name | QT | Time | BS |
|---|---|---|---|---|
| 1 | Johannes Høsflot Klæbo (NOR) | 3:17.64 (1) | 3:21.28 | 60 |
| 2 | Jules Chappaz (FRA) | 3:19.92 (3) | +3.11 | 54 |
| 3 | Anton Grahn (SWE) | 3:23.95 (26) | +3.14 | 48 |
| 4 | Ansgar Evensen (NOR) | 3:22.34 (15) | +3.63 | 46 |
| 5 | Lars Heggen (NOR) | 3:23.19 (21) | +4.26 | 44 |
| 6 | Jan Stölben (GER) | 3:22.20 (12) | +11.23 | 42 |
| 7 | Joni Mäki (FIN) | 3:20.85 (5) | SF | 32 |
| 8 | Harald Østberg Amundsen (NOR) | 3:21.12 (7) | SF | 30 |
| 9 | Mattis Stenshagen (NOR) | 3:23.13 (20) | SF | 28 |
| 10 | Federico Pellegrino (ITA) | 3:23.84 (25) | SF | 26 |

Women – 1.5 km Sprint Classic
| Rank | Name | QT | Time | BS |
|---|---|---|---|---|
| 1 | Jasmi Joensuu (FIN) | 3:46.21 (1) | 3:45.75 | 60 |
| 2 | Nadine Fähndrich (SUI) | 3:46.95 (2) | +0.44 | 54 |
| 3 | Johanna Hagström (SWE) | 3:48.53 (4) | +1.94 | 48 |
| 4 | Maja Dahlqvist (SWE) | 3:58.98 (25) | +5.03 | 46 |
| 5 | Johanna Matintalo (FIN) | 3:49.05 (6) | +6.42 | 44 |
| 6 | Anja Weber (SUI) | 3:57.67 (21) | +13.63 | 42 |
| 7 | Jessie Diggins (USA) | 3:54.10 (12) | SF | 32 |
| 8 | Moa Lundgren (SWE) | 3:48.67 (5) | SF | 30 |
| 9 | Julie Bjervig Drivenes (NOR) | 3:52.03 (8) | SF | 28 |
| 10 | Jasmin Kähärä (FIN) | 3:53.08 (10) | SF | 26 |

=== Stage 6 ===
4 January 2026, Val di Fiemme, Italy

- No bonus seconds are awarded on this stage.

Men – 10 km Final Climb Mass Start Free
| Rank | Name | Time |
|---|---|---|
| 1 | Mattis Stenshagen (NOR) | 33:25.5 |
| 2 | Jules Lapierre (FRA) | +6.6 |
| 3 | Emil Iversen (NOR) | +20.4 |
| 4 | Saveliy Korostelev (AIN) | +25.4 |
| 5 | Harald Østberg Amundsen (NOR) | +30.1 |
| 6 | Joe Davies (GBR) | +39.0 |
| 7 | Federico Pellegrino (ITA) | +46.5 |
| 8 | Andrew Musgrave (GBR) | +49.6 |
| 9 | Hugo Lapalus (FRA) | +52.7 |
| 10 | Clément Parisse (FRA) | +56.4 |

Women – 10 km Final Climb Mass Start Free
| Rank | Name | Time |
|---|---|---|
| 1 | Karoline Simpson-Larsen (NOR) | 37:05.3 |
| 2 | Jessie Diggins (USA) | +8.8 |
| 3 | Heidi Weng (NOR) | +14.4 |
| 4 | Teresa Stadlober (AUT) | +17.5 |
| 5 | Ebba Andersson (SWE) | +21.9 |
| 6 | Dariya Nepryaeva (AIN) | +1:04.3 |
| 7 | Nora Sanness (NOR) | +1:22.0 |
| 8 | Alison Mackie (CAN) | +1:24.5 |
| 9 | Julie Bjervig Drivenes (NOR) | +1:28.8 |
| 10 | Helen Hoffmann (GER) | +1:37.8 |

== World Cup points distribution ==
The table shows the number of 2025–26 FIS Cross-Country World Cup points to win in the 2025–26 Tour de Ski for men and women.

| Place | 1 | 2 | 3 | 4 | 5 | 6 | 7 | 8 | 9 | 10 | 11 | 12 | 13 | 14 | 15 | 16 | 17 | 18 | 19 | 20 | 21 | 22 | 23 | 24 | 25 | 26 | 27 | 28 | 29 | 30 | 31 | 32 | 33 | 34 | 35 | 36 | 37 | 38 | 39 | 40 | 41 | 42 | 43 | 44 | 45 | 46 | 47 | 48 | 49 | 50 |
| Overall Standings | 300 | 285 | 270 | 255 | 240 | 225 | 216 | 207 | 198 | 189 | 180 | 174 | 168 | 162 | 156 | 150 | 144 | 138 | 132 | 126 | 120 | 114 | 108 | 102 | 96 | 90 | 84 | 78 | 72 | 66 | 60 | 57 | 54 | 51 | 48 | 45 | 42 | 39 | 36 | 33 | 30 | 27 | 24 | 21 | 18 | 15 | 12 | 9 | 6 | 3 |
| Each Stage | 50 | 47 | 44 | 41 | 38 | 35 | 32 | 30 | 28 | 26 | 24 | 22 | 20 | 18 | 16 | 15 | 14 | 13 | 12 | 11 | 10 | 9 | 8 | 7 | 6 | 5 | 4 | 3 | 2 | 1 |

== Sources ==
- Rules for the FIS Cross-Country World Cup Edition 2025/26 (PDF). International Ski Federation. 2025.
- FIS Cross-Country World Cup 2025/26 (PDF). International Ski Federation. 2025.
