= Alvar Myhlback =

Swedish cross-country skier (born 2006)

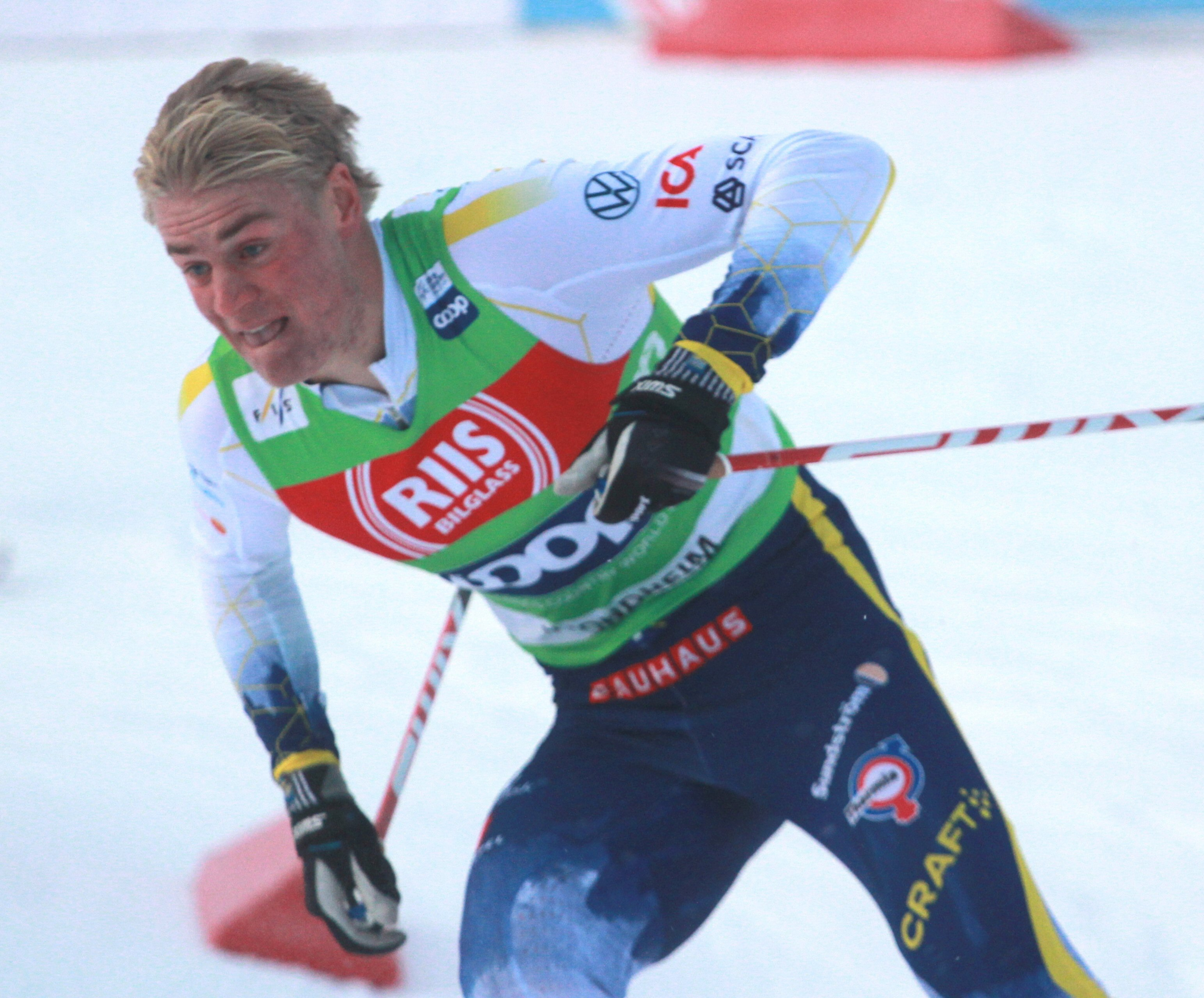
- Alvar Myhlback

Personal information
- Nationality: Sweden
- Born: 22 March 2006 (age 20) Bjursås, Sweden

Sport
- Sport: Skiing
- Club: Bjursås BK

World Cup career
- Seasons: 1 – (2025–present)
- Indiv. starts: 11
- Indiv. podiums: 1
Medal record
Men's cross-country skiing
Representing Sweden
Junior World Championships
Gold medal – first place	2024 Plancia	10 km classical
Gold medal – first place	2024 Planica	4 × 5 km relay
- Updated on 14 March 2026

Alvar Myhlback (22 March 2006) is a Swedish long-distance cross-country skier. He participated in the 2026 Winter Olympics.

Despite his young age, he already has several podium finishes from Vasaloppet. He finished 8th in 2023, 3rd in 2024 and 2nd in 2026. In 2025, he became the youngest Vasaloppet winner ever at the age of 18.

== Career ==
On 5 December 2025, Myhlback placed third in the Sprint at the 2025–26 FIS Cross-Country World Cup.

=== Individual podiums ===
- 1 podium – (1 WC)

No.	Season	Date	Location	Race	Level	Place
1	2025–26	5 December 2025	Trondheim, Norway	1.4 km Sprint C	World Cup	3rd
