= 2024 Nordic Junior World Ski Championships =

Ski event in Slovenia

2024 FIS Nordic Junior World Ski Championships
- Location: Planica, Slovenia
- Dates: 5–11 February

The 2024 FIS Nordic Junior World Ski Championships were held from 5 to 11 February 2024 in Planica, Slovenia.

== Schedule ==
All times are local (UTC+1).

Cross-country

Date	Time	Event
5 February	10:30	Women's junior sprint freestyle Men's junior sprint freestyle
6 February	10:30	Women's U23 sprint freestyle Men's U23 sprint freestyle
7 February	11:15	Women's junior 20 km mass start freestyle
7 February	13:30	Men's junior 20 km mass start freestyle
8 February	11:15	Women's U23 20 km mass start freestyle
8 February	14:00	Men's U23 20 km mass start freestyle
9 February	10:00	Women's junior 10 km classical
9 February	11:45	Men's junior 10 km classical
10 February	11:00	Women's U23 10 km classical
10 February	13:00	Men's U23 10 km classical
11 February	10:00	Mixed junior 4 × 5 km relay
11 February	12:00	Mixed U23 4 × 5 km relay

Nordic combined

Date	Time	Event
7 February	09:45; 15:45	Mixed team HS102 / 5+2.5+2.5+5 km
9 February	09:30; 14:30	Women's HS102 / 5 km
9 February	11:30; 15:15	Men's HS102 / 10 km
10 February	10:00; 15:00	Women's team sprint HS102 / 2 × 4,5 km
11 February	09:15; 14:00	Men's team sprint HS102 / 2 × 7,5 km

Ski jumping

Date	Time	Event
7 February	17:00	Women's HS102
8 February	17:00	Men's HS102
9 February	17:00	Women's team HS102
10 February	16:30	Men's team HS102
11 February	15:30	Mixed team HS102

== Medal summary ==
=== Junior events ===
==== Cross-country skiing ====
Event	Gold		Silver		Bronze	
Men's Junior Events
Sprint freestyle	Lars Heggen; Norway	2:17.77	Anton Grahn; Sweden	2:17.98	Jonatan Lindberg; Sweden	2:20.42
10 kilometre classical	Alvar Myhlback; Sweden	23:05.9	Isai Näff; Switzerland	23:58.3	Mons Melbye; Norway	24:02.7
20 kilometre mass start freestyle	Jørgen Nordhagen; Norway	47:35.9	Aksel Artusi; Italy	49:47.1	Davide Ghio; Italy	49:51.5
Women's Junior Events
Sprint freestyle	Gina del Rio; Andorra	2:40.84	Samantha Smith; United States	2:41.91	Milla Grosberghaugen Andreassen; Norway	2:43.62
10 kilometre classical	Evelina Crüsell; Sweden	26:40.1	Gina del Rio; Andorra	26:48.6	Anniken Sand; Norway	27:03.5
20 kilometre mass start freestyle	Maria Gismondi; Italy	52:48.3	Anniken Sand; Norway	53:00.3	Gina del Rio; Andorra	53:09.3
Mixed Junior Events
4 × 5 kilometre relay	Sweden Anton Grahn; Mira Göransson; Alvar Myhlback; Evelina Crüsell	50:35.2	Norway Mons Melbye; Anniken Sand; Jørgen Nordhagen; Milla Grosberghaugen Andreassen	50:49.1	Italy Davide Ghio; Iris De Martin Pinter; Aksel Artusi; Maria Gismondi	51:20.3

==== Nordic combined ====
Event	Gold		Silver		Bronze	
Men's Junior Events
Individual normal hill/10 km	Paul Walcher; Austria	25:51.3	Tristan Sommerfeldt; Germany	26:08.1	Jens Dahlseide Kvamme; Norway	26:10.8
Team sprint normal hill/2 × 7.5 km	Germany Richard Stenzel; Tristan Sommerfeldt	30:51.6	Austria Jonas Fischbacher; Paul Walcher	30:56.7	Norway Jørgen Berget Storsveen; Jens Dahlseide Kvamme	31:39.0
Women's Junior Events
Individual normal hill/5 km	Minja Korhonen; Finland	15:24.7	Alexa Brabec; United States	15:26.2	Ronja Loh; Germany	15:35.7
Team sprint normal hill/2 × 4.5 km	Japan Hazuki Ikeda; Yuzuka Fujiwara	22:22.9	United States Alexa Brabec; Kai McKinnon	22:23.6	Austria Anna-Sophia Gredler; Laura Pletz	22:50.8
Mixed Junior Events
Team normal hill/5+2.5+2.5+5 km	Germany Richard Stenzel; Anne Häckel; Ronja Loh; Tristan Sommerfeldt	41:26.5	Japan Kyotaro Yamazaki; Hazuki Ikeda; Yuzuka Fujiwara; Atsushi Narita	41:53.7	Norway Even Leinan Lund; Ingrid Låte; Nora Helene Evans; Jørgen Berget Storsveen	42:28.7

==== Ski jumping ====
Event	Gold		Silver		Bronze	
Men's Junior Events
Individual normal hill	Stephan Embacher; Austria	266.7	Erik Belshaw; United States	265.9	Adrian Tittel; Germany	259.3
Team normal hill	Austria Simon Steinberger; Fabian Held; Johannes Pölz; Stephan Embacher	934.3	Germany Ben Bayer; Alex Reiter; Jannik Faißt; Adrian Tittel	923.6	Poland Łukasz Łukaszczyk; Marcin Wróbel; Klemens Joniak; Tymoteusz Amilkiewicz	873.3
Women's Junior Events
Individual normal hill	Tina Erzar; Slovenia	266.3	Julia Mühlbacher; Austria	250.9	Taja Bodlaj; Slovenia	247.9
Team normal hill	Slovenia Ajda Košnjek; Jerica Jesenko; Taja Bodlaj; Tina Erzar	906.5	Japan Yuzuki Sato; Mei Hasegawa; Riko Iwasaki; Kurumi Ichinohe	791.9	Germany Anna-Fay Scharfenberg; Kim Amy Duschek; Megi Lou Schmidt; Alvine Holz	786.1
Mixed Junior Events
Team normal hill	Austria Julia Mühlbacher; Johannes Pölz; Sahra Schuller; Stephan Embacher	930.2	Slovenia Taja Bodlaj; Jaka Drinovec; Tina Erzar; Rok Masle	926.3	Germany Anna-Fay Scharfenberg; Jannik Faißt; Alvine Holz; Adrian Tittel	910.5

=== U23 events ===
==== Cross-country skiing ====
Event	Gold		Silver		Bronze	
Men's U23 Events
Sprint freestyle	Aleksander Elde Holmboe; Norway	2:15.78	Matz William Jenssen; Norway	2:15.92	John Steel Hagenbuch; United States	2:16.49
10 kilometre classical	Mathias Holbæk; Norway	24:22.6	Martin Kirkeberg Mørk; Norway	24:25.7	Edvard Sandvik; Norway	24:42.5
20 kilometre mass start freestyle	Mathis Desloges; France	46:37.3	Martin Kirkeberg Mørk; Norway	46:55.1	Fabrizio Albasini; Switzerland	47:01.5
Women's U23 Events
Sprint freestyle	Sonjaa Schmidt; Canada	2:35.82	Hilla Niemelä; Finland	2:36.30	Maria Hartz Melling; Norway	2:36.38
10 kilometre classical	Helen Hoffmann; Germany	27:38.0	Nadja Kälin; Switzerland	27:39.2	Märta Rosenberg; Sweden	27:42.7
20 kilometre mass start freestyle	Marina Kälin; Switzerland	48:58.6	Haley Brewster; United States	48:59.9	Maëlle Veyre; France	49:03.1
Mixed U23 Events
4 × 5 kilometre relay	Canada Derek Deuling; Jasmine Drolet; Max Hollmann; Liliane Gagnon	50:09.7	France Rémi Bourdin; Julie Pierrel; Mathis Desloges; Maëlle Veyre	50:10.4	Sweden Måns Skoglund; Elin Henriksson; Truls Gisselman; Märta Rosenberg	50:10.5

=== Medal tables ===
==== All events ====
* Host nation (Slovenia)

Rank	Nation	Gold	Silver	Bronze	Total
1	Norway	4	5	8	17
2	Austria	4	2	1	7
3	Germany	3	2	4	9
4	Sweden	3	1	3	7
5	Slovenia*	2	1	1	4
6	Canada	2	0	0	2
7	Switzerland	1	2	1	4
8	Japan	1	2	0	3
9	Italy	1	1	2	4
10	Andorra	1	1	1	3
10	France	1	1	1	3
12	Finland	1	1	0	2
13	United States	0	5	1	6
14	Poland	0	0	1	1
Totals (14 entries)		24	24	24	72

==== Junior events ====
* Host nation (Slovenia)

Rank	Nation	Gold	Silver	Bronze	Total
1	Austria	4	2	1	7
2	Sweden	3	1	1	5
3	Norway	2	2	6	10
4	Germany	2	2	4	8
5	Slovenia*	2	1	1	4
6	Japan	1	2	0	3
7	Italy	1	1	2	4
8	Andorra	1	1	1	3
9	Finland	1	0	0	1
10	United States	0	4	0	4
11	Switzerland	0	1	0	1
12	Poland	0	0	1	1
Totals (12 entries)		17	17	17	51

==== Under-23 events ====
Rank	Nation	Gold	Silver	Bronze	Total
1	Norway	2	3	2	7
2	Canada	2	0	0	2
3	France	1	1	1	3
3	Switzerland	1	1	1	3
5	Germany	1	0	0	1
6	United States	0	1	1	2
7	Finland	0	1	0	1
8	Sweden	0	0	2	2
Totals (8 entries)		7	7	7	21
