= 2022 Nordic Junior World Ski Championships =

International skiing competition

- Location: Zakopane, Poland (ski jumping and Nordic combined); Lygna [no], Norway (cross-country)
- Dates: 22 February – 6 March

The 2022 FIS Nordic Junior World Ski Championships were held from 22 February to 6 March 2022 in Zakopane, Poland, and Lygna, Norway.

== Schedule ==
All times are local (UTC+1).

Cross-country

Date	Time	Event
22 February	13:00	Women's junior 15 km mass start freestyle
22 February	15:00	Men's junior 30 km mass start freestyle
23 February	13:00	Women's junior 4 × 3.3 km relay
23 February	15:00	Men's junior 4 × 5 km relay
24 February	13:00	Women's U23 10 km classical
24 February	15:00	Men's U23 15 km classical
25 February	13:00	Women's junior 5 km classical
25 February	15:00	Men's junior 10 km classical
26 February	10:00	Men's U23 sprint freestyle Women's U23 sprint freestyle
27 February	10:00	Men's junior sprint freestyle Women's junior sprint freestyle
27 February	14:30	Mixed U23 4 × 5 km relay

Nordic combined

Date	Time	Event
2 March	09:15; 14:00	Women's HS105 / 5 km
2 March	11:30; 15:00	Men's HS105 / 10 km
4 March	10:00; 13:00	Mixed team HS105 / 5+2.5+2.5+5 km
5 March	10:00; 13:00	Men's team HS105 / 4×5 km

Ski jumping

Date	Time	Event
3 March	16:00	Women's HS105
3 March	19:00	Men's HS105
5 March	15:30	Women's team HS105
5 March	18:30	Men's team HS105
6 March	10:00	Mixed team HS105

== Medal summary ==
=== Junior events ===
==== Cross-country skiing ====
Event	Gold		Silver		Bronze	
Men's Junior Events
Sprint freestyle	Johannes Lønnestad Flaaten; Norway	2:15.55	Elia Barp; Italy	2:16.21	Aleksander Elde Holmboe; Norway	2:18.44
10 kilometre classical	Saveliy Korostelev; Russia	26:15.8	Niko Anttola; Finland	26:37.2	Alexander Ivshin; Russia	26:38.0
30 kilometre mass start freestyle	Alexander Ivshin; Russia	1:12:47.9	Saveliy Korostelev; Russia	1:12:56.0	Nikita Denisov; Russia	1:12:59.9
4 × 5 kilometre relay	Russia Nikita Rodionov; Alexander Ivshin; Nikita Denisov; Saveliy Korostelev	49:16.4	Norway Preben Horven; Johannes Lønnestad Flaaten; Nikolai Elde Holmboe; Aleksander Elde Holmboe	49:38.2	United States Michael Earnhart; Brian Bushey; Walker Hall; Will Koch	49:38.8
Women's Junior Events
Sprint freestyle	Maria Hartz Melling; Norway	2:36.17	Märta Rosenberg; Sweden	2:36.54	Elizaveta Bekisheva; Russia	2:38.02
5 kilometre classical	Dariya Nepryayeva; Russia	14:30.1	Elizaveta Bekisheva; Russia	14:33.0	Emma Kirkeberg Mørk; Norway	14:34.1
15 kilometre mass start freestyle	Helen Hoffmann; Germany	39:23.1	Lisa Eriksson; Sweden	39:25.7	Tuva Anine Brusveen-Jensen; Norway	39:31.3
4 × 3.3 kilometre relay	Norway Maria Hartz Melling; Emma Kirkeberg Mørk; Tuva Anine Brusveen-Jensen; Anna Heggen	36:52.3	Russia Evgeniya Krupitskaya; Dariya Nepryayeva; Anna Kozhinova; Elizaveta Bekisheva	36:52.4	Germany Verena Veit; Germana Thannheimer; Lara Dellit; Helen Hoffmann	37:27.7

==== Nordic combined ====
Event	Gold		Silver		Bronze	
Men's Junior Events
Individual normal hill/10 km	Stefan Rettenegger; Austria	23:30.9	Perttu Reponen; Finland	24:04.7	Tristan Sommerfeldt; Germany	24:10.7
Team normal hill/4 × 5 km	Finland Waltteri Karhumaa; Arsi Tietäväinen; Eelis Meriläinen; Perttu Reponen	54:28.9	Norway Torje Seljeset; Per Einar Skjæret Strømhaug; Sebastian Østvold; Eidar Johan Strøm	54:35.4	Austria Kilian Gütl; Severin Reiter; Paul Walcher; Stefan Rettenegger	55:19.7
Women's Junior Events
Individual normal hill/5 km	Annika Sieff; Italy	14:30.1	Haruka Kasai; Japan	14:31.0	Natalie Armbruster; Germany	14:33.3
Mixed Junior Events
Team normal hill/5+2.5+2.5+5 km	Germany Simon Mach; Jenny Nowak; Natalie Armbruster; Tristan Sommerfeldt	41:11.8	Italy Stefano Radovan; Annika Sieff; Daniela Dejori; Iacopo Bortolas	41:15.7	Austria Samuel Lev; Lisa Hirner; Annalena Slamik; Stefan Rettenegger	41:38.4

==== Ski jumping ====
Event	Gold		Silver		Bronze	
Men's Junior Events
Individual normal hill	Daniel Tschofenig; Austria	311.5	David Haagen; Austria	299.6	Markus Müller; Austria	287.6
Team normal hill	Austria David Haagen; Markus Müller; Jonas Schuster; Daniel Tschofenig	1.038.5	Norway Adrian Thon Gundersrud; Johannes Aardal; Sindre Ulven Jørgensen; Iver Olaussen	982.7	Germany Finn Braun; Ben Bayer; Simon Spiewok; Luca Geyer	963.0
Women's Junior Events
Individual normal hill	Nika Prevc; Slovenia	240.5	Taja Bodlaj; Slovenia	230.5	Alexandria Loutitt; Canada	223.7
Team normal hill	Slovenia Jerneja Repinc Zupančič; Lara Logar; Taja Bodlaj; Nika Prevc	888.5	Japan Haruka Kasai; Hina Tsuchida; Ringo Miyajima; Nagomi Nakayama	784.0	Germany Christina Feicht; Anna-Fay Scharfenberg; Pia Lilian Kübler; Michelle Göbel	765.0
Mixed Junior Events
Team normal hill	Austria Vanessa Moharitsch; Daniel Tschofenig; Julia Mühlbacher; David Haagen	884.4	Slovenia Taja Bodlaj; Marcel Stržinar; Nika Prevc; Maksim Bartolj	819.0	Norway Nora Midtsundstad; Johannes Aardal; Heidi Dyhre Traaserud; Iver Olaussen	772.5

=== U23 events ===
==== Cross-country skiing ====
Event	Gold		Silver		Bronze	
Men's U23 Events
Sprint freestyle	Valerio Grond; Switzerland	2:14.95	Denis Filimonov; Russia	2:15.36	Magnus Øyaas Håbrekke; Norway	2:15.62
15 kilometre classical	Arsi Ruuskanen; Finland	40:23.0	Leo Johansson; Sweden	40:29.7	Håvard Moseby; Norway	40:51.1
Women's U23 Events
Sprint freestyle	Moa Hansson; Sweden	2:34.79	Monika Skinder; Poland	2:35.28	Nataliya Mekryukova; Russia	2:35.29
10 kilometre classical	Anja Weber; Switzerland	29:59.8	Patrīcija Eiduka; Latvia	30:01.1	Veronika Stepanova; Russia	30:12.9
Mixed U23 Events
4 × 5 kilometre relay	Norway Mari Folkvord; Håvard Moseby; Andreas Fjorden Ree; Kristin Austgulen Fosnæs	49:20.5	France Mélissa Gal; Théo Schely; Jules Chappaz; Eve-Ondine Duchaufour	49:28.0	Russia Anastasiya Faleyeva; Ivan Gorbunov; Denis Filimonov; Veronika Stepanova	49:32.7

=== Medal tables ===
==== All events ====
* Host nation (Norway) and (Poland)

Rank	Nation	Gold	Silver	Bronze	Total
1	Russia	4	4	6	14
2	Norway*	4	3	6	13
3	Austria	4	1	3	8
4	Finland	2	2	0	4
4	Slovenia	2	2	0	4
6	Germany	2	0	5	7
7	Switzerland	2	0	0	2
8	Sweden	1	3	0	4
9	Italy	1	2	0	3
10	Japan	0	2	0	2
11	France	0	1	0	1
11	Latvia	0	1	0	1
11	Poland*	0	1	0	1
14	Canada	0	0	1	1
14	United States	0	0	1	1
Totals (15 entries)		22	22	22	66

==== Junior events ====
* Host nation (Norway) and (Poland)

Rank	Nation	Gold	Silver	Bronze	Total
1	Russia	4	3	3	10
2	Austria	4	1	3	8
3	Norway*	3	3	4	10
4	Slovenia	2	2	0	4
5	Germany	2	0	5	7
6	Finland	1	2	0	3
6	Italy	1	2	0	3
8	Japan	0	2	0	2
8	Sweden	0	2	0	2
10	Canada	0	0	1	1
10	United States	0	0	1	1
Totals (11 entries)		17	17	17	51

==== Under-23 events ====
* Host nation (Norway)

Rank	Nation	Gold	Silver	Bronze	Total
1	Switzerland	2	0	0	2
2	Sweden	1	1	0	2
3	Norway*	1	0	2	3
4	Finland	1	0	0	1
5	Russia	0	1	3	4
6	France	0	1	0	1
6	Latvia	0	1	0	1
6	Poland	0	1	0	1
Totals (8 entries)		5	5	5	15
