= 2025–26 FIS Cross-Country World Cup =

Cross-country skiing competition

Discipline	Men	Women
Overall	(Norway) Johannes Høsflot Klæbo (6)	(United States) Jessie Diggins (4)
Distance	(Norway) Johannes Høsflot Klæbo (1)	(United States) Jessie Diggins (4)
Sprint	(Norway) Johannes Høsflot Klæbo (8)	(Sweden) Maja Dahlqvist (3)
U23	(Norway) Lars Heggen (1)	(Canada) Alison Mackie (1)
Bonus ranking	(Norway) Johannes Høsflot Klæbo (6)	(United States) Jessie Diggins (2)
Nations Cup	Norway (37)	Sweden (4)
- Nations Cup overall: Norway (37)

Stage events
Tour de Ski	(Norway) Johannes Høsflot Klæbo (5)	(United States) Jessie Diggins (3)

Competition
Edition	45th	45th
Locations	12	12
Individual	27	27
Relay/Team	2	2
Mixed	0	0

The 2025–26 FIS Cross-Country World Cup, organized by the International Ski Federation (FIS) was the 45th World Cup for men and women as the highest level of international cross-country skiing competitions.

The men's and women's season started on 28 November 2025 in Ruka, Finland and concluded on 22 March 2026 in Lake Placid, United States.

The season took a break in February due to the 2026 Winter Olympics in Milan, Italy. This was also the first season since the 2021-22 season that both Russian and Belarusian athletes were allowed to participate under certain rules.

Johannes Høsflot Klæbo from Norway and Jessie Diggins from the United States were the reigning champions from the previous season and defended their titles.

== Season overview ==
The proposed World Cup schedule for the 2025–26 season was approved at a meeting in Vilamoura on 8 May.

== Map of world cup hosts ==
All 12 locations hosting world cup events in this season.

Europe

North America

Period I Period II – Tour de Ski Period III Period IV

== Men ==
=== Calendar ===
Key: C – Classic / F – Freestyle ; MSS – Mass Start / PUR – Pursuit
No.	WC	Date	Place	Discipline	Winner	Second	Third	R.
1		28 November 2025	(Finland) Ruka	10 km C	(Norway) Martin Løwstrøm Nyenget	(Norway) Johannes Høsflot Klæbo	(Austria) Mika Vermeulen	
2		29 November 2025	(Finland) Ruka	Sprint C	(Norway) Johannes Høsflot Klæbo	(Norway) Erik Valnes	(Norway) Ansgar Evensen	
3		30 November 2025	(Finland) Ruka	20 km F MSS	(Norway) Harald Østberg Amundsen	(Norway) Einar Hedegart	(Sweden) Edvin Anger	
4		5 December 2025	(Norway) Trondheim	Sprint C	(Norway) Johannes Høsflot Klæbo	(Norway) Oskar Opstad Vike	(Sweden) Alvar Myhlback	
5		6 December 2025	(Norway) Trondheim	20 km skiathlon	(Norway) Johannes Høsflot Klæbo	(Norway) Harald Østberg Amundsen	(Norway) Emil Iversen	
6		7 December 2025	(Norway) Trondheim	10 km F	(Norway) Einar Hedegart	(Norway) Andreas Fjorden Ree	(Norway) Martin Løwstrøm Nyenget	
7		13 December 2025	(Switzerland) Davos	Sprint F	(France) Lucas Chanavat	(Italy) Federico Pellegrino	(Norway) Oskar Opstad Vike	
8		14 December 2025	(Switzerland) Davos	10 km F	(Norway) Einar Hedegart	(Norway) Harald Østberg Amundsen	(Norway) Mattis Stenshagen	
TdS	9	28 December 2025	(Italy) Toblach	Sprint F	(Norway) Johannes Høsflot Klæbo	(Norway) Lars Heggen	(Norway) Oskar Opstad Vike	
TdS	10	29 December 2025	(Italy) Toblach	10 km C	(Norway) Mattis Stenshagen	(Norway) Johannes Høsflot Klæbo	(Norway) Emil Iversen	
TdS	11	31 December 2025	(Italy) Toblach	5 km F Heat MSS	(United States) Gus Schumacher	(Austria) Benjamin Moser	(Norway) Lars Heggen	
TdS	12	1 January 2026	(Italy) Toblach	20 km C PUR	(Norway) Johannes Høsflot Klæbo	(Norway) Mattis Stenshagen	(Sweden) Edvin Anger	
TdS	13	3 January 2026	(Italy) Val di Fiemme	Sprint C	(Norway) Johannes Høsflot Klæbo	(France) Jules Chappaz	(Sweden) Anton Grahn	
TdS	14	4 January 2026	(Italy) Val di Fiemme	10 km F MSS Climb	(Norway) Mattis Stenshagen	(France) Jules Lapierre	(Norway) Emil Iversen	
9	20th Tour de Ski Overall (28 December 2025 – 4 January 2026)				(Norway) Johannes Høsflot Klæbo	(Norway) Mattis Stenshagen	(Norway) Harald Østberg Amundsen	
10	15	17 January 2026	(Germany) Oberhof	Sprint F	(Norway) Lars Heggen	(Italy) Federico Pellegrino	(Norway) Even Northug	
11	16	18 January 2026	(Germany) Oberhof	10 km C	(Norway) Martin Løwstrøm Nyenget	(Finland) Iivo Niskanen	(Norway) Erik Valnes	
12	17	24 January 2026	(Switzerland) Goms	Sprint C	(Norway) Johannes Høsflot Klæbo	(United States) Gus Schumacher	(Sweden) Edvin Anger	
13	18	25 January 2026	(Switzerland) Goms	20 km C MSS	(Norway) Johannes Høsflot Klæbo	(Norway) Emil Iversen	(Norway) Harald Østberg Amundsen	
2026 Winter Olympics (7 February – 22 February • Milan, Italy)
14	19	28 February 2026	(Sweden) Falun	Sprint F	(Norway) Johannes Høsflot Klæbo	(Norway) Lars Heggen	(Austria) Benjamin Moser	
15	20	1 March 2026	(Sweden) Falun	20 km skiathlon	(Norway) Johannes Høsflot Klæbo	(Norway) Harald Østberg Amundsen	(Norway) Martin Løwstrøm Nyenget	
16	21	7 March 2026	(Finland) Lahti	Sprint F	(Norway) Johannes Høsflot Klæbo	(Norway) Lars Heggen	(France) Jules Chappaz	
17	22	8 March 2026	(Finland) Lahti	10 km C	(Norway) Johannes Høsflot Klæbo	(Norway) Martin Løwstrøm Nyenget	(Individual Neutral Athletes) Savelii Korostelev	
18	23	12 March 2026	(Norway) Drammen	Sprint C	(Norway) Ansgar Evensen	(Czech Republic) Jiří Tuž	(Norway) Kristian Kollerud	
19	24	14 March 2026	(Norway) Oslo	50 km F MSS	(Norway) Einar Hedegart	(Norway) Harald Østberg Amundsen	(Norway) Martin Løwstrøm Nyenget	
20	25	20 March 2026	(United States) Lake Placid	10 km C	(Norway) Johannes Høsflot Klæbo	(Norway) Andreas Fjorden Ree	(Norway) Mattis Stenshagen	
21	26	21 March 2026	(United States) Lake Placid	Sprint F	(Italy) Federico Pellegrino	(Norway) Lars Heggen	(Sweden) Anton Grahn	
22	27	22 March 2026	(United States) Lake Placid	20 km F MSS	(Norway) Johannes Høsflot Klæbo	(Norway) Harald Østberg Amundsen	(Norway) Einar Hedegart	
45th FIS World Cup Overall (28 November 2025 – 22 March 2026)					(Norway) Johannes Høsflot Klæbo	(Norway) Harald Østberg Amundsen	(Italy) Federico Pellegrino	

=== Overall leaders ===
Holder (Note: The leading position in the World Cup belongs to the competitor who has accumulated the most points in the general classification of the series in the competitions held so far. In the event of an equal number of points, the World Cup leader is the competitor who has won more competitions.)	Date	Place(s)	Number of competitions
(Norway) Martin Løwstrøm Nyenget	28 November 2025	(Finland) Ruka	1
(Norway) Johannes Høsflot Klæbo	29 November 2025 – 22 March 2026	(Finland) Ruka – (United States) Lake Placid	27

=== Standings ===
==== Overall ====
Rank	final standings after 28 events	Points
	(Norway) Johannes Høsflot Klæbo	2301
2	(Norway) Harald Østberg Amundsen	1848
3	(Italy) Federico Pellegrino	1443
4	(Norway) Mattis Stenshagen	1316
5	(Norway) Lars Heggen	1218
6	(Norway) Andreas Fjorden Ree	1121
7	(United States) Gus Schumacher	1113
8	(Italy) Elia Barp	1072
9	(Norway) Martin Løwstrøm Nyenget	972
10	(Norway) Emil Iversen	927

==== Distance ====
Rank	final standings after 16 events	Points
	(Norway) Johannes Høsflot Klæbo	1166
2	(Norway) Harald Østberg Amundsen	1141
3	(Norway) Andreas Fjorden Ree	980
4	(Norway) Martin Løwstrøm Nyenget	972
5	(Norway) Mattis Stenshagen	926
6	(Italy) Elia Barp	745
7	(Norway) Emil Iversen	687
8	(Italy) Federico Pellegrino	622
9	(France) Hugo Lapalus	588
10	(Finland) Arsi Ruuskanen	542

==== Sprint ====
Rank	final standings after 11 events	Points
	(Norway) Johannes Høsflot Klæbo	835
2	(Norway) Lars Heggen	657
3	(Italy) Federico Pellegrino	566
4	(Norway) Ansgar Evensen	523
5	(France) Jules Chappaz	518
6	(Norway) Even Northug	505
7	(United States) Ben Ogden	498
8	(France) Lucas Chanavat	460
9	(Norway) Oskar Opstad Vike	460
10	(Sweden) Anton Grahn	449

==== U23 ====
Rank	final standings after 28 events	Points
	(Norway) Lars Heggen	1218
2	(Individual Neutral Athletes) Savelii Korostelev	800
3	(Italy) Martino Carollo	687
4	(Czech Republic) Jiří Tuž	504
5	(Sweden) Anton Grahn	470
6	(Norway) Oskar Opstad Vike	460
7	(Sweden) Alvar Myhlback	345
8	(Finland) Niko Anttola	281
9	(Norway) Filip Skari	253
10	(Switzerland) Noe Näff	246

==== Bonus ranking ====
Rank	final standings after 11 events	Points
1	(Norway) Johannes Høsflot Klæbo	209
2	(Norway) Harald Østberg Amundsen	176
3	(Norway) Martin Løwstrøm Nyenget	122
4	(Norway) Mattis Stenshagen	117
5	(Norway) Andreas Fjorden Ree	87
6	(Norway) Emil Iversen	79
7	(Italy) Federico Pellegrino	62
8	(Individual Neutral Athletes) Savelii Korostelev	59
9	(Norway) Lars Heggen	48
10	(Sweden) Edvin Anger	46

==== Prize money ====
Rank	final standings after 34 payouts	CHF
1	(Norway) Johannes Høsflot Klæbo	347 200
2	(Norway) Harald Østberg Amundsen	198 000
3	(Norway) Mattis Stenshagen	122 750
4	(Italy) Federico Pellegrino	117 500
5	(Norway) Lars Heggen	106 700
6	(Norway) Martin Løwstrøm Nyenget	80 100
7	(Norway) Einar Hedegart	71 000
8	(Norway) Andreas Fjorden Ree	65 600
9	(Norway) Emil Iversen	62 600
10	(United States) Gus Schumacher	53 700

== Women ==
=== Calendar ===
Key: C – Classic / F – Freestyle ; MSS – Mass Start / PUR – Pursuit
No.	WC	Date	Place	Discipline	Winner	Second	Third	R.
1		28 November 2025	(Finland) Ruka	10 km C	(Sweden) Frida Karlsson	(Norway) Heidi Weng	(Sweden) Moa Ilar	
2		29 November 2025	(Finland) Ruka	Sprint C	(Norway) Kristine Stavås Skistad	(Sweden) Jonna Sundling	(Sweden) Maja Dahlqvist	
3		30 November 2025	(Finland) Ruka	20 km F MSS	(Sweden) Jonna Sundling	(United States) Jessie Diggins	(Norway) Heidi Weng	
4		5 December 2025	(Norway) Trondheim	Sprint C	(Sweden) Johanna Hagström	(Sweden) Emma Ribom	(Sweden) Linn Svahn	
5		6 December 2025	(Norway) Trondheim	20 km skiathlon	(United States) Jessie Diggins	(Norway) Heidi Weng	(Sweden) Ebba Andersson	
6		7 December 2025	(Norway) Trondheim	10 km F	(Sweden) Ebba Andersson	(Sweden) Moa Ilar	(United States) Jessie Diggins	
7		13 December 2025	(Switzerland) Davos	Sprint F	(Sweden) Jonna Sundling	(Norway) Mathilde Myhrvold	(Switzerland) Nadine Fähndrich	
8		14 December 2025	(Switzerland) Davos	10 km F	(Norway) Karoline Simpson-Larsen	(Sweden) Moa Ilar	(Norway) Astrid Øyre Slind	
TdS	9	28 December 2025	(Italy) Toblach	Sprint F	(Norway) Kristine Stavås Skistad	(Germany) Coletta Rydzek	(Sweden) Maja Dahlqvist	
TdS	10	29 December 2025	(Italy) Toblach	10 km C	(Norway) Astrid Øyre Slind	(Austria) Teresa Stadlober	(United States) Jessie Diggins	
TdS	11	31 December 2025	(Italy) Toblach	5 km F Heat MSS	(United States) Jessie Diggins	(Sweden) Emma Ribom	(Sweden) Moa Ilar	
TdS	12	1 January 2026	(Italy) Toblach	20 km C PUR	(United States) Jessie Diggins	(Sweden) Moa Ilar	(Austria) Teresa Stadlober	
TdS	13	3 January 2026	(Italy) Val di Fiemme	Sprint C	(Finland) Jasmi Joensuu	(Switzerland) Nadine Fähndrich	(Sweden) Johanna Hagström	
TdS	14	4 January 2026	(Italy) Val di Fiemme	10 km F MSS Climb	(Norway) Karoline Simpson-Larsen	(United States) Jessie Diggins	(Norway) Heidi Weng	
9	20th Tour de Ski Overall (28 December 2025 – 4 January 2026)				(United States) Jessie Diggins	(Austria) Teresa Stadlober	(Norway) Heidi Weng	
10	15	17 January 2026	(Germany) Oberhof	Sprint F	(Sweden) Jonna Sundling	(Germany) Coletta Rydzek	(Sweden) Maja Dahlqvist	
11	16	18 January 2026	(Germany) Oberhof	10 km C	(Sweden) Moa Ilar	(Austria) Teresa Stadlober	(Sweden) Jonna Sundling	
12	17	24 January 2026	(Switzerland) Goms	Sprint C	(Sweden) Linn Svahn	(Germany) Laura Gimmler	(Switzerland) Nadine Fähndrich	
13	18	25 January 2026	(Switzerland) Goms	20 km C MSS	(Finland) Johanna Matintalo	(United States) Jessie Diggins	(Norway) Astrid Øyre Slind	
2026 Winter Olympics (7 February – 22 February • Milan, Italy)
14	19	28 February 2026	(Sweden) Falun	Sprint F	(Sweden) Linn Svahn	(Norway) Kristine Stavås Skistad	(Switzerland) Nadine Fähndrich	
15	20	1 March 2026	(Sweden) Falun	20 km skiathlon	(Norway) Heidi Weng	(United States) Jessie Diggins	(Sweden) Frida Karlsson	
16	21	7 March 2026	(Finland) Lahti	Sprint F	(Sweden) Jonna Sundling	(Sweden) Linn Svahn	(Germany) Coletta Rydzek	
17	22	8 March 2026	(Finland) Lahti	10 km C	(Sweden) Frida Karlsson	(Sweden) Linn Svahn	(United States) Jessie Diggins	
18	23	12 March 2026	(Norway) Drammen	Sprint C	(Sweden) Jonna Sundling	(Norway) Kristine Stavås Skistad	(Switzerland) Nadine Fähndrich	
19	24	14 March 2026	(Norway) Oslo	50 km F MSS	(Sweden) Frida Karlsson	(Sweden) Linn Svahn	(Sweden) Jonna Sundling	
20	25	20 March 2026	(United States) Lake Placid	10 km C	(Sweden) Linn Svahn	(Sweden) Frida Karlsson	(Norway) Heidi Weng	
21	26	21 March 2026	(United States) Lake Placid	Sprint F	(Sweden) Linn Svahn	(Sweden) Jonna Sundling	(Sweden) Maja Dahlqvist	
22	27	22 March 2026	(United States) Lake Placid	20 km F MSS	(Sweden) Jonna Sundling	(Sweden) Linn Svahn	(Norway) Heidi Weng	
45th FIS World Cup Overall (28 November 2025 – 22 March 2026)					(United States) Jessie Diggins	(Sweden) Moa Ilar	(Sweden) Maja Dahlqvist	

=== Overall leaders ===
Holder	Date	Place(s)	Number of competitions
(Sweden) Frida Karlsson	28 November 2025	(Finland) Ruka	1
(Sweden) Moa Ilar	29 November 2025	(Finland) Ruka	1
(United States) Jessie Diggins	30 November 2025 – 22 March 2026	(Finland) Ruka – (United States) Lake Placid	26

=== Standings ===
==== Overall ====
Rank	final standings after 28 events	Points
	(United States) Jessie Diggins	2303
2	(Sweden) Moa Ilar	1922
3	(Sweden) Maja Dahlqvist	1623
4	(Sweden) Jonna Sundling	1422
5	(Norway) Heidi Weng	1324
6	(Sweden) Linn Svahn	1300
7	(Switzerland) Nadine Fähndrich	1135
8	(Finland) Jasmi Joensuu	1079
9	(Austria) Teresa Stadlober	1063
10	(Finland) Johanna Matintalo	1047

==== Distance ====
Rank	final standings after 16 events	Points
	(United States) Jessie Diggins	1361
2	(Sweden) Moa Ilar	1087
3	(Norway) Heidi Weng	1048
4	(Sweden) Frida Karlsson	951
5	(Norway) Karoline Simpson-Larsen	822
6	(Austria) Teresa Stadlober	776
7	(Norway) Astrid Øyre Slind	736
8	(Norway) Kristin Austgulen Fosnæs	685
9	(Sweden) Jonna Sundling	672
10	(Sweden) Maja Dahlqvist	647

==== Sprint ====
Rank	final standings after 11 events	Points
	(Sweden) Maja Dahlqvist	814
2	(Sweden) Johanna Hagström	798
3	(Switzerland) Nadine Fähndrich	793
4	(Sweden) Jonna Sundling	750
5	(Sweden) Linn Svahn	727
6	(Germany) Coletta Rydzek	659
7	(United States) Jessie Diggins	642
8	(Sweden) Moa Ilar	628
9	(Finland) Jasmi Joensuu	562
10	(Germany) Laura Gimmler	560

==== U23 ====
Rank	final standings after 28 events	Points
	(Canada) Alison Mackie	548
2	(Italy) Iris De Martin Pinter	488
3	(Andorra) Gina Del Rio	451
4	(Norway) Milla Grosberghaugen Andreassen	440
5	(France) Léonie Perry	398
6	(Norway) Eva Ingebrigtsen	252
7	(United States) Sammy Smith	212
8	(Switzerland) Marina Kälin	187
9	(Sweden) Evelina Crüsell	176
10	(Italy) Maria Gismondi	111

==== Bonus ranking ====
Rank	final standings after 11 events	Points
1	(United States) Jessie Diggins	218
2	(Norway) Heidi Weng	166
3	(Sweden) Frida Karlsson	139
4	(Sweden) Ebba Andersson	94
5	(Norway) Astrid Øyre Slind	90
6	(Norway) Karoline Simpson-Larsen	74
7	(Sweden) Moa Ilar	71
8	(Austria) Teresa Stadlober	63
9	(Sweden) Maja Dahlqvist	61
10	(Switzerland) Nadine Fähndrich	50

==== Prize money ====
Rank	final standings after 34 payouts	CHF
1	(United States) Jessie Diggins	248 000
2	(Sweden) Jonna Sundling	167 800
3	(Sweden) Linn Svahn	139 600
4	(Sweden) Moa Ilar	134 100
5	(Norway) Heidi Weng	125 050
6	(Sweden) Maja Dahlqvist	106 000
7	(Austria) Teresa Stadlober	93 850
8	(Sweden) Frida Karlsson	78 100
9	(Switzerland) Nadine Fähndrich	58 900
10	(Sweden) Ebba Andersson	57 600

== Team events ==
Event key: C – Classic / F – Freestyle
#	Date	Place	Discipline	Winner	Second	Third	Red bib (After competition)	R.
Men's Team
1	12 December 2025	(Switzerland) Davos	Sprint F	Norway I: 1. Erik Valnes; 2. Johannes Høsflot Klæbo	Italy I: 1. Elia Barp; 2. Federico Pellegrino	Sweden I: 1. Johan Häggström; 2. Edvin Anger	Norway	
2	23 January 2026	(Switzerland) Goms	Sprint F	Norway I: 1. Harald Østberg Amundsen; 2. Einar Hedegart	Italy I: 1. Elia Barp; 2. Federico Pellegrino	United States I: 1. Ben Ogden; 2. Gus Schumacher	Norway	
Women's Team
1	12 December 2025	(Switzerland) Davos	Sprint F	Sweden I: 1. Maja Dahlqvist; 2. Jonna Sundling	Norway II: 1. Astrid Øyre Slind; 2. Mathilde Myhrvold	Norway I: 1. Kristin Austgulen Fosnæs; 2. Kristine Stavås Skistad	Sweden	
2	23 January 2026	(Switzerland) Goms	Sprint F	Germany I: 1. Laura Gimmler; 2. Coletta Rydzek	Norway I: 1. Astrid Øyre Slind; 2. Julie Bjervig Drivenes	Norway II: 1. Karoline Grøtting; 2. Tiril Udnes Weng	Sweden	

== Nations Cup ==
=== Overall ===
Rank	final standings after 60 events	Points
1	Norway	14841
2	Sweden	11528
3	Finland	7474
4	United States	7009
5	Italy	6648
6	Germany	5840
7	Switzerland	5641
8	France	5108
9	Austria	3188
10	Czechia	2512

=== Men ===
Rank	final standings after 30 events	Points
1	Norway	8308
2	Italy	4518
3	Sweden	3970
4	France	3811
5	Finland	3371
6	United States	3185
7	Switzerland	2072
8	Austria	1778
9	Germany	1775
10	Czechia	1454

=== Women ===
Rank	final standings after 30 events	Points
1	Sweden	7558
2	Norway	6533
3	Finland	4103
4	Germany	4065
5	United States	3824
6	Switzerland	3569
7	Italy	2130
8	Austria	1410
9	Canada	1298
10	France	1297

== Podium table by nation ==
Table showing the World Cup podium places (gold–1st place, silver–2nd place, bronze–3rd place) by the countries represented by the athletes.

Rank	Nation	Gold	Silver	Bronze	Total
1	Norway	33	27	27	87
2	Sweden	17	12	19	48
3	United States	5	5	4	14
4	Finland	2	1	0	3
5	Italy	1	4	0	5
6	Germany	1	3	1	5
7	France	1	2	1	4
8	Austria	0	4	3	7
9	Switzerland	0	1	4	5
10	Czech Republic	0	1	0	1
11	Individual Neutral Athletes	0	0	1	1
Totals (11 entries)		60	60	60	180

== Point distribution ==
The table shows the number of points to win in every competition in the 2025–26 Cross-Country Skiing World Cup for men and women.

Place	1	2	3	4	5	6	7	8	9	10	11	12	13	14	15	16	17	18	19	20	21	22	23	24	25	26	27	28	29	30	31	32	33	34	35	36	37	38	39	40	41	42	43	44	45	46	47	48	49	50
Individual	100	95	90	85	80	75	72	69	66	63	60	58	56	54	52	50	48	46	44	42	40	38	36	34	32	30	28	26	24	22	20	19	18	17	16	15	14	13	12	11	10	9	8	7	6	5	4	3	2	1
Relay	200	160	120	100	90	80	72	64	58	52	48	44	40	36	32	30	28	26	24	22	20	18	16	14	12	10	8	6	4	2
Team sprint	200	160	120	100	90	80	72	64	58	52	48	44	40	36	32	30	28	26	24	22	20	18	16	14	12	10	8	6	4	2
Tour de Ski	300	285	270	255	240	225	216	207	198	189	180	174	168	162	156	150	144	138	132	126	120	114	108	102	96	90	84	78	72	66	60	57	54	51	48	45	42	39	36	33	30	27	24	21	18	15	12	9	6	3
Stage Tour de Ski	50	47	44	41	38	35	32	30	28	26	24	22	20	18	16	15	14	13	12	11	10	9	8	7	6	5	4	3	2	1
Bonus points (MSS checkpoints)	15	12	10	8	6	5	4	3	2	1
Sprint Q	15	12	10	8	6	5	4	3	2	1

== Achievements ==
Only individual events.

First World Cup career victory

Men

- (Norway) Einar Hedegart (24), in his 2nd season – the WC 6 (10 km F) in Trondheim; first podium was 2024–2025 WC 21 (10 km F) in Oslo
- (Norway) Mattis Stenshagen (29), in his 9th season – the WC 9 (10 km C) in Toblach; first podium was 2023–2024 WC 23 (20 km C Mass Start) in Canmore
- (Norway) Lars Heggen (20), in his 1st season – the WC 10 (Sprint F) in Oberhof; first podium was 2025–2026 WC 9 (Sprint F) in Toblach
- (Norway) Ansgar Evensen (25), in his 5th season – the WC 18 (Sprint C) in Drammen; first podium was 2023–2024 WC 11 (Sprint C) in Oberhof

Women

- (Norway) Karoline Simpson-Larsen (28), in her 6th season – the WC 8 (10 km F) in Davos, also first podium
- (Finland) Jasmi Joensuu (29), in her 8th season – the WC 9 (Sprint C) in Val di Fiemme; first podium was 2024–2025 WC 9 (Sprint F) in Toblach
- (Finland) Johanna Matintalo (29), in her 11th season – the WC 13 (20 km C Mass Start) in Goms; first podium was 2021–2022 WC 9 (Sprint C) in Oberstdorf

First World Cup podium

Men

- (Norway) Andreas Fjorden Ree (25), in his 3rd season – the WC 6 (10 km F) in Trondheim – 2nd place
- (Norway) Lars Heggen (20), in his 1st season – the WC 9 (Sprint F) in Toblach – 2nd place
- (Austria) Benjamin Moser (28), in his 7th season – the WC 9 (5 km F Heat Mass Start) in Toblach – 2nd place
- (Czech Republic) Jiří Tuž (21), in his 3rd season – the WC 18 (Sprint C) in Drammen – 2nd place
- (Sweden) Alvar Myhlback (19), in his 3rd season – the WC 4 (Sprint C) in Trondheim – 3rd place
- (Sweden) Anton Grahn (21), in his 4th season – the WC 9 (Sprint C) in Val Di Fiemme – 3rd place
- (Individual Neutral Athletes) Savelii Korostelev (22), in his 1st season – the WC 17 (10 km C) in Lahti – 3rd place
- (Norway) Kristian Kollerud (21), in his 1st season – the WC 18 (Sprint C) in Drammen – 3rd place

Women

- (Norway) Karoline Simpson-Larsen (28), in her 6th season – the WC 8 (10 km F) in Davos – 1st place

Number of wins this season (in brackets are all-time wins)

Men

- (Norway) Johannes Høsflot Klæbo – 15 (113) (Note: Men's all-time record in World Cup history)
- (Norway) Einar Hedegart – 3 (3)
- (Norway) Martin Løwstrøm Nyenget – 2 (7)
- (Norway) Mattis Stenshagen – 2 (2)
- (Italy) Federico Pellegrino – 1 (18)
- (Norway) Harald Østberg Amundsen – 1 (12)
- (France) Lucas Chanavat – 1 (5)
- (United States) Gus Schumacher – 1 (2)
- (Norway) Lars Heggen – 1 (1)
- (Norway) Ansgar Evensen – 1 (1)

Women

- (Sweden) Jonna Sundling – 6 (18)
- (United States) Jessie Diggins – 4 (31)
- (Sweden) Linn Svahn – 4 (20)
- (Sweden) Frida Karlsson – 3 (16)
- (Norway) Kristine Stavås Skistad – 2 (13)
- (Norway) Karoline Simpson-Larsen – 2 (2)
- (Norway) Heidi Weng – 1 (14)
- (Sweden) Ebba Andersson – 1 (9)
- (Norway) Astrid Øyre Slind – 1 (5)
- (Sweden) Moa Ilar – 1 (3)
- (Sweden) Johanna Hagström – 1 (2)
- (Finland) Jasmi Joensuu – 1 (1)
- (Finland) Johanna Matintalo – 1 (1)

== Retirements ==
The following notable skiers, who competed in the World Cup, retire during or after the 2025–26 season:

Men

- (Sweden) Jens Burman
- (Germany) Lucas Bögl
- (Czech Republic) Ondřej Černý
- (Italy) Francesco De Fabiani
- (Finland) Perttu Hyvärinen
- (Sweden) Johan Häggström
- (France) Richard Jouve
- (Norway) Håvard Moseby
- (Italy) Dietmar Noeckler
- (France) Clément Parisse
- (Italy) Federico Pellegrino
- (Sweden) Anton Persson
- (Switzerland) Candide Pralong
- (Italy) Lorenzo Romano
- (Switzerland) Jason Rüesch
- (Italy) Giandomenico Salvadori
- (Sweden) Björn Sandström
- (Norway) Sindre Bjørnestad Skar
- (Poland) Maciej Staręga
- (Norway) Didrik Tønseth
- (Finland) Markus Vuorela
- (Spain) Ricardo Izquierdo-Bernier
- (Slovakia) Andrej Renda
- (Bulgaria) Daniel Peshkov
- (Bulgaria) Simeon Deyanov
- (Hungary) Ádám Kónya

Women

- (Norway) Ane Appelkvist Stenseth
- (United States) Rosie Brennan
- (Austria) Katharina Brudermann
- (Italy) Martina Di Centa
- (United States) Jessie Diggins
- (Switzerland) Nadine Fähndrich
- (Italy) Francesca Franchi
- (Finland) Krista Pärmäkoski
- (Finland) Kerttu Niskanen
- (Norway) Silje Øyre Slind
- (Norway) Silje Theodorsen
- (Finland) Katri Lylynperä
- (Slovenia) Eva Urevc
- (Czech Republic) Barbora Antošová
- (Bulgaria) Kalina Nedyalkova
- (United States) Hailey Swirbul
- (Norway) Ingvild Flugstad Østberg
