= Benjamin Moser (cross-country skier) =

Austrian cross-country skier (born 1997)

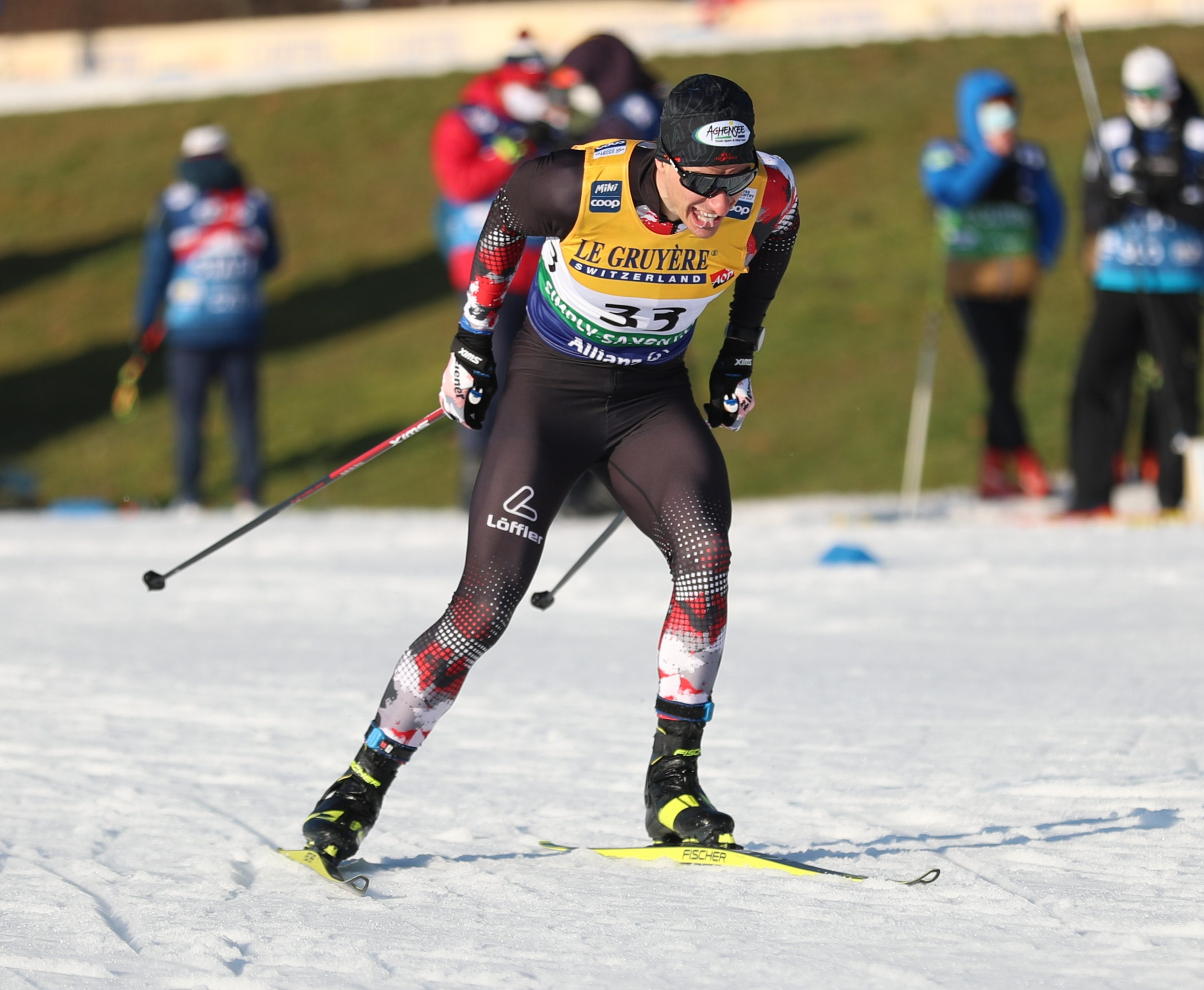

Personal information
- Nationality: Austria
- Born: 24 July 1997 (age 29) Schwaz, Austria

Sport
- Sport: Skiing
- Club: SV Achensee-Tirol

World Cup career
- Seasons: 7 – (2019–present)
- Indiv. starts: 82
- Indiv. podiums: 2
- Team podiums: 0
- Overall titles: 0
- Discipline titles: 0

Benjamin Moser (born 24 July 1997) is an Austrian cross-country skier. He competed at the 2022 Winter Olympics and 2026 Winter Olympics. His first World Cup medal came in Toblach in the 25-26 season where he placed second behind Gus Schumacher. His second podium came in Falun where he took bronze in the sprint free.

== Cross-country skiing results ==
All results are sourced from the International Ski Federation (FIS).

=== Olympic Games ===
| Year | Age | 15 km individual | 30 km skiathlon | 50 km mass start | Sprint | 4 × 10 km relay | Team sprint |
|---|---|---|---|---|---|---|---|
| 2022 | 24 | — | — | —^{[a]} | 43 | — | 10 |
| 2026 | 28 | 26 | — | — | 33 | — | 7 |

^{a} Distance reduced to 30 km due to weather conditions.

=== World Championships ===
| Year | Age | 15 km individual | 30 km skiathlon | 50 km mass start | Sprint | 4 × 10 km relay | Team sprint |
|---|---|---|---|---|---|---|---|
| 2019 | 21 | — | — | — | 56 | — | — |
| 2021 | 23 | — | — | — | 43 | — | 11 |
| 2023 | 25 | — | — | — | 34 | — | 15 |
| 2025 | 27 | — | — | 41 | 28 | 12 | 13 |

=== World Cup ===
==== Season standings ====
| Season | Age | Discipline standings | | | Ski Tour standings | |
| Season | Age | Overall | Distance | Sprint | Nordic Opening | Tour de Ski |
|---|---|---|---|---|---|---|
| 2021 | 23 | 139 | — | 87 | —N/a | — |
| 2022 | 24 | 156 | — | 88 | —N/a | — |
| 2023 | 25 | 72 | — | 31 | —N/a | — |
| 2024 | 26 | 69 | — | 31 | —N/a | — |
| 2025 | 27 | 48 | 94 | 22 | —N/a | — |
| 2026 | 28 | 11 | 25 | 23 | —N/a | 10 |

==== Individual podiums ====
- 2 podiums – (1 WC, 1 SWC)

| No. | Season | Date | Location | Race | Level | Place |
|---|---|---|---|---|---|---|
| 1 | 2025–26 | 31 December 2025 | Toblach, Italy | 5 km Heat Mass Start F | Stage World Cup | 2nd |
| 2 | 2025–26 | 28 February 2026 | Falun, Sweden | Sprint F | World Cup | 3rd |
