= FIS Nordic World Ski Championships 2025 – Men's team sprint =

Men's team sprint at the FIS Nordic World Ski Championships 2025
- Venue: Granåsen Ski Centre
- Location: Trondheim, Norway
- Dates: 5 March
- Competitors: 86 from 43 nations
- Teams: 43
- Winning time: 18:27.71

Medalists
gold medal	Erik Valnes; Johannes Høsflot Klæbo	Norway
silver medal	Ristomatti Hakola; Lauri Vuorinen	Finland
bronze medal	Oskar Svensson; Edvin Anger	Sweden

The Men's team sprint competition at the FIS Nordic World Ski Championships 2025 was held on 5 March 2025.

== Results ==
=== Qualification ===
The qualification was started at 11:29.

Rank	Bib	Country	Athletes	Time	Deficit	Notes
1	1	Norway	Erik Valnes; Johannes Høsflot Klæbo	6:19.21		Q
2	7	Finland	Ristomatti Hakola; Lauri Vuorinen	6:23.25	+4.04	Q
3	5	France	Jules Chappaz; Richard Jouve	6:23.81	+4.60	Q
4	9	Czech Republic	Jiří Tuž; Michal Novák	6:26.26	+7.05	Q
5	6	Switzerland	Janik Riebli; Valerio Grond	6:29.77	+10.56	Q
6	17	Poland	Maciej Staręga; Dominik Bury	6:30.27	+11.06	Q
7	3	Italy	Davide Graz; Federico Pellegrino	6:30.95	+11.74	Q
8	2	United States	Gus Schumacher; JC Schoonmaker	6:32.99	+13.78	Q
9	10	Germany	Elias Keck; Jan Stölben	6:33.43	+14.22	Q
10	16	Spain	Bernat Sellés; Jaume Pueyo	6:33.77	+14.56	Q
11	8	Canada	Antoine Cyr; Xavier McKeever	6:34.28	+15.07	Q
12	4	Sweden	Oskar Svensson; Edvin Anger	6:34.31	+15.10	Q
13	12	Slovenia	Miha Šimenc; Nejc Štern	6:34.65	+15.44	Q
14	14	Austria	Benjamin Moser; Lukas Mrkonjic	6:35.92	+16.71	Q
15	25	China	Kuerbanjiang Wuerkaixi; Wang Qiang	6:38.17	+18.96	Q
16	13	Estonia	Martin Himma; Christopher Kalev	6:39.01	+19.80	
17	15	Latvia	Raimo Vīgants; Lauris Kaparkalējs	6:40.28	+21.07	
18	23	Kazakhstan	Konstantin Bortsov; Svyatoslav Matassov	6:41.53	+22.32	
19	11	Great Britain	Andrew Young; James Clugnet	6:50.95	+31.74	
20	19	Australia	Seve de Campo; Lars Young Vik	6:55.10	+35.89	
21	18	Ukraine	Dmytro Drahun; Oleksandr Lisohor	6:58.31	+39.10	
22	28	Iceland	Dagur Benediktsson; Astmar Helgi Kristinsson	7:02.64	+43.43	
23	22	Romania	Florin Dolhascu; Gabriel Cojocaru	7:04.22	+45.01	
24	31	Lithuania	Modestas Vaičiulis; Tautvydas Strolia	7:04.56	+45.35	
25	30	Turkey	Abdullah Yılmaz; Amed Oğlağo	7:05.13	+45.92	
26	21	South Korea	Byun Ji-yeong; Lee Joon-seo	7:07.23	+48.02	
27	26	Argentina	Franco Dal Farra; Mateo Lorenzo Sauma	7:13.48	+55.27	
28	39	Brazil	Manex Silva; Victor Santos	7:20.52	+1:02.31	
29	20	Bulgaria	Mario Matikanov; Daniel Peshkov	7:21.13	+1:02.92	
30	33	Slovakia	Jáchym Cenek; Michal Adamov	7:22.55	+1:04.34	
31	29	Chile	Martín Flores; Sebastián Endrestad	7:27.29	+1:09.08	
32	27	Belgium	Mathis Poutot; Samuel Maes	7:29.88	+1:10.67	
33	24	Ireland	Thomas Maloney Westgård; Dylan Longridge	7:34.30	+1:15.09	
34	34	Croatia	Marko Skender; Matija Štimac	7:35.90	+1:16.69	
35	40	Haiti	Stevenson Savart; Theo Mallett	7:51.85	+1:32.64	
36	37	Thailand	Thanakorn Ngoeichai; Mark Chanloung	7:52.88	+1:33.67	
37	36	Greece	Apostolos Angelis; Nikolaos Tsourekas	7:55.14	+1:35.93	
38	35	Serbia	Andrija Tošić; Miloš Milosavljević	7:55.29	+1:36.08	
39	38	Hungary	Csongor Ferbár; Ádám Büki	7:55.35	+1:36.14	
40	42	Colombia	Samuel Jaramillo; Fredrik Fodstad	8:04.52	+1:45.31	
41	32	North Macedonia	Stavre Jada; Darko Damjanovski	8:27.16	+2:07.95	
42	41	Portugal	José Cabeça; Filipe Cabrita	9:01.23	+2:42.02	
	43	Venezuela	Guillermo Racero; Eduardo Arteaga	Did not start		

=== Final ===
The final was started at 15:26.

Rank	Bib	Country	Athletes	Time	Deficit
1st place, gold medalist(s)	1	Norway	Erik Valnes; Johannes Høsflot Klæbo	18:27.71	
2nd place, silver medalist(s)	7	Finland	Ristomatti Hakola; Lauri Vuorinen	18:31.81	+4.10
3rd place, bronze medalist(s)	4	Sweden	Oskar Svensson; Edvin Anger	18:31.82	+4.11
4	3	Italy	Davide Graz; Federico Pellegrino	18:32.11	+4.40
5	5	France	Jules Chappaz; Richard Jouve	18:37.88	+10.17
6	2	United States	Gus Schumacher; JC Schoonmaker	18:40.01	+12.30
7	9	Czech Republic	Jiří Tuž; Michal Novák	18:49.13	+21.42
8	8	Canada	Antoine Cyr; Xavier McKeever	18:55.48	+27.77
9	6	Switzerland	Janik Riebli; Valerio Grond	18:55.70	+27.99
10	10	Germany	Elias Keck; Jan Stölben	19:06.15	+38.44
11	12	Slovenia	Miha Šimenc; Nejc Štern	19:13.92	+46.21
12	25	China	Kuerbanjiang Wuerkaixi; Wang Qiang	19:31.98	+1:04.27
13	14	Austria	Benjamin Moser; Lukas Mrkonjic	19:35.17	+1:07.46
14	16	Spain	Bernat Sellés; Jaume Pueyo	19:38.09	+1:10.38
15	17	Poland	Maciej Staręga; Dominik Bury	20:02.74	+1:35.03
