= Lars Heggen =

Norwegian cross-country skier (born 2005)

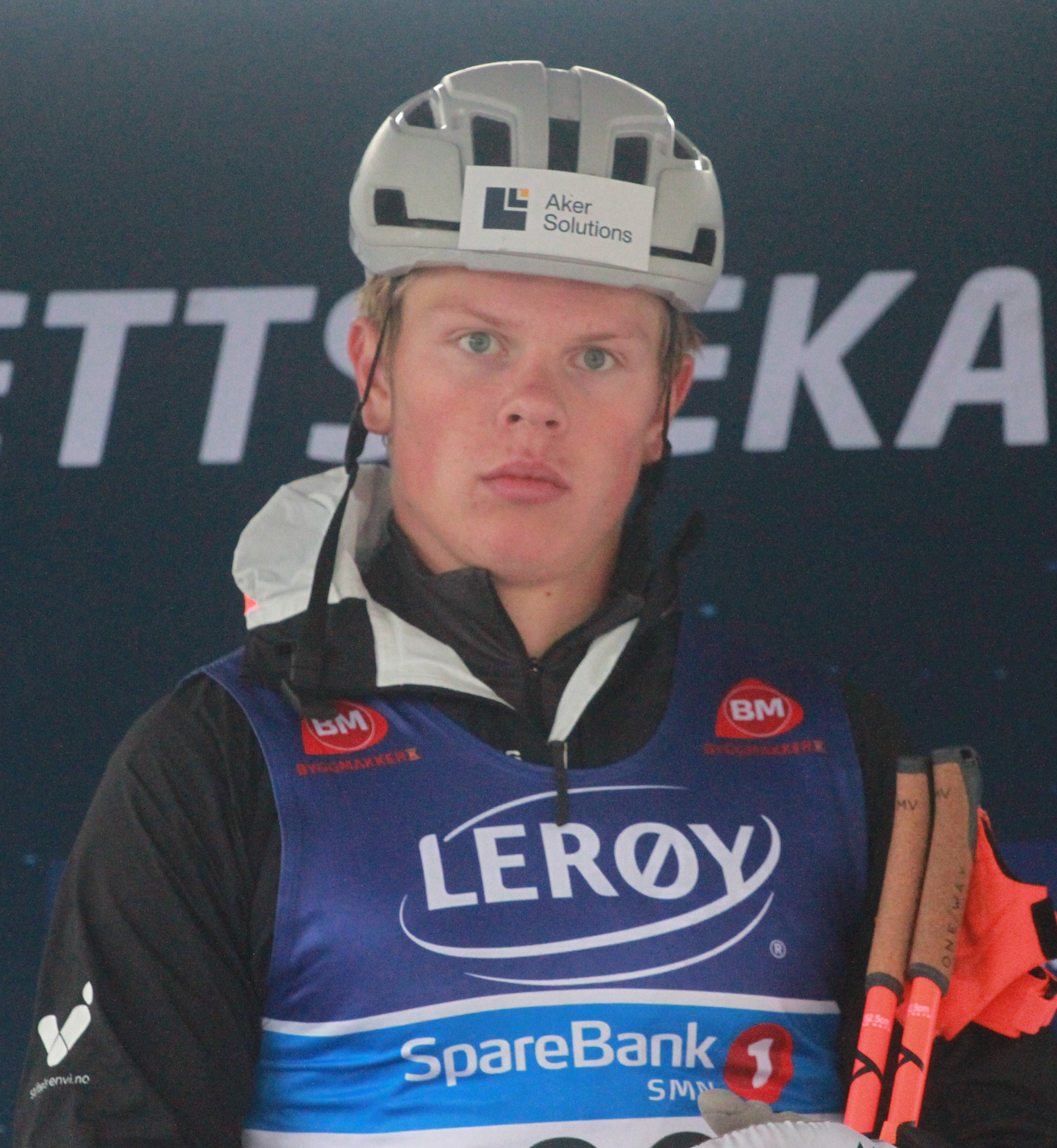
- Heggen in 2025

Personal information
- Nationality: Norway
- Born: 17 July 2005 (age 21)

Sport
- Sport: Cross-country skiing
- Club: Harestua IL

World Cup career
- Seasons: 1 – (2026–present)
- Indiv. starts: 18
- Indiv. podiums: 6
- Indiv. wins: 1
Medal record
Men's cross-country skiing
Representing Norway
Junior World Championships
Gold medal – first place	2023 Whistler	4 × 5 km relay
Gold medal – first place	2024 Planica	Sprint freestyle
Gold medal – first place	2025 Schilpario	10 km freestyle
Gold medal – first place	2025 Schilpario	20 km mass start
Gold medal – first place	2025 Schilpario	4 × 5 km relay
Silver medal – second place	2023 Whistler	10 km freestyle
Silver medal – second place	2025 Schilpario	Sprint classical
- Updated on 21 March 2026

Lars Heggen (born 17 July 2005) is a Norwegian cross-country skier. He is a five-time Junior World Champion.

== Career ==
Heggen competed at the 2025 Nordic Junior World Ski Championships and won gold medals in the 10 kilometre freestyle, 20 kilometre mass start, and 4 x 5 kilometre relay. He also won a silver medal in the sprint classical.

During the 2025–26 FIS Cross-Country World Cup, Heggen earned his first career World Cup podium on 28 December 2025, finishing in second place. He earned his first career World Cup victory on 17 January 2026.

== Cross-country skiing results ==
All results are sourced from the International Ski Federation (FIS).

=== World Cup ===
==== Season standings ====
Season	Age	Discipline standings				Ski Tour standings
Season	Age	Overall	Distance	Sprint	U23	Tour de Ski
2026	20	5	26	2nd place, silver medalist(s)	1st place, gold medalist(s)	6

==== Individual podiums ====
- 1 victories – (1 WC)
- 6 podiums – (4 WC, 2 SWC)

No.	Season	Date	Location	Race	Level	Place
1	2025–26	28 December 2025	Toblach, Italy	1.4 km Sprint F	Stage World Cup	2nd
2	2025–26	31 December 2025	Toblach, Italy	5 km Mass Start F	Stage World Cup	3rd
3	2025–26	17 January 2026	Oberhof, Germany	1.3 km Sprint F	World Cup	1st
4	2025–26	28 February 2026	Falun, Sweden	1.4 km Sprint F	World Cup	2nd
5	2025–26	7 March 2026	Lahti, Finland	1.5 km Sprint F	World Cup	2nd
6	2025–26	21 March 2026	(United States) Lake Placid, USA	1.4 km Sprint F	World Cup	2nd
