= Andreas Fjorden Ree =

Norwegian cross-country skier (born 2000)

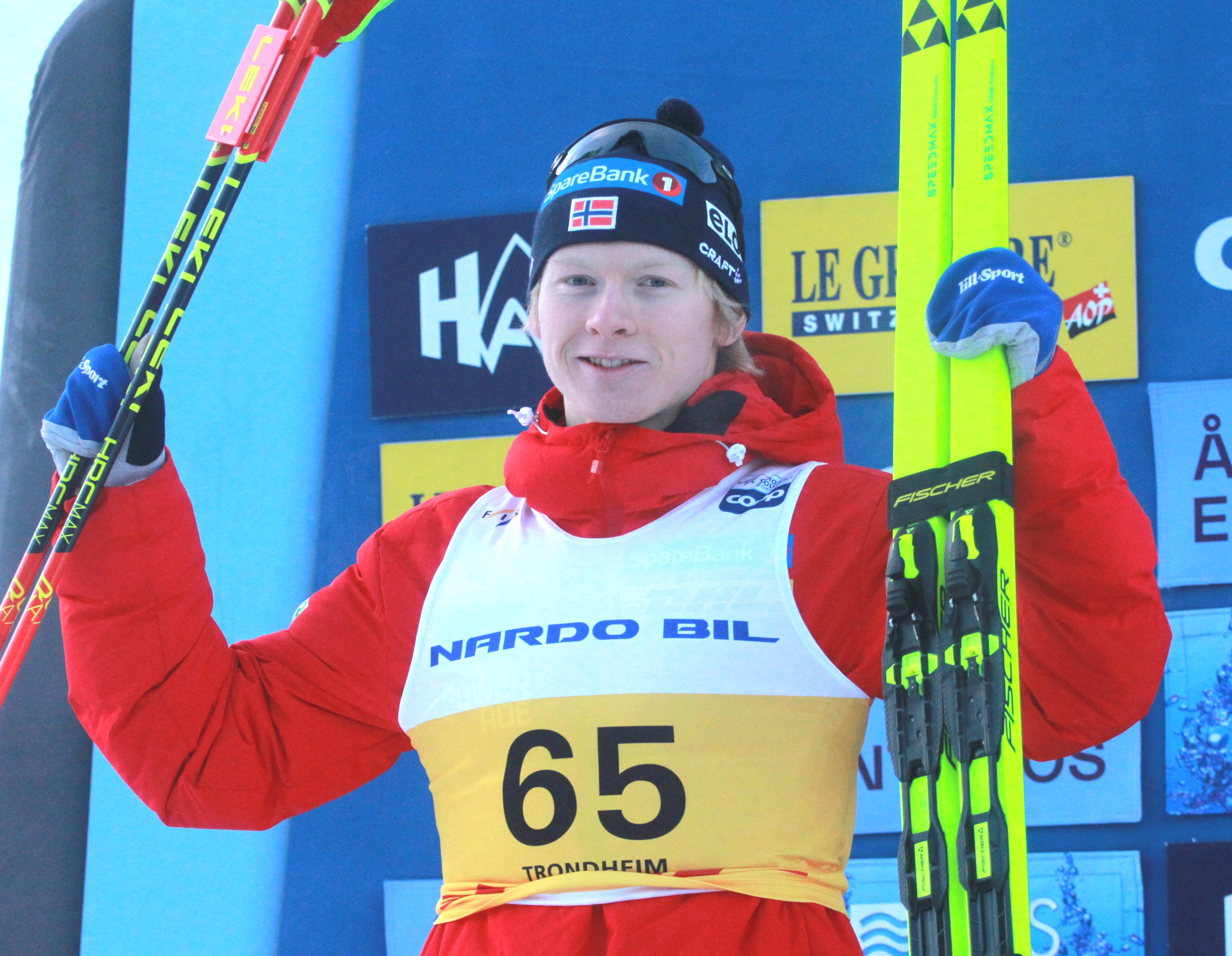

Personal information
- Nationality: Norway
- Born: 16 April 2000 (age 26)

Sport
- Sport: Cross-country skiing
- Club: Støren SK

World Cup career
- Seasons: 2024–present
- Indiv. starts: 38
- Indiv. podiums: 2
- Indiv. wins: 0
Medal record
Men's cross-country skiing
Representing Norway
U23 World Championships
Gold medal – first place	2022 Lygna	4 × 5 km relay
- Updated on 22 March 2026

Andreas Fjorden Ree (born 16 April 2000) is a Norwegian cross-country skier.

== Career ==
Ree first burst onto the senior scene with a win in Beitostølen to open up the 2024–25 season. His world cup breakout performance came the next year though in Trondheim where he won silver in the 10 km freestyle. He earned his second podium placing second again in the 10 km classical event in Lake Placid. He finished the year 3rd in the distance standings behind only Johannes Høsflot Klæbo and Harald Østberg Amundsen.

== Cross-country skiing results ==
All results are sourced from the International Ski Federation (FIS).

=== World Cup ===
==== Season standings ====
Season	Age	Discipline standings				Ski Tour standings		
Season	Age	Overall	Distance	Sprint	U23	Nordic Opening	Tour de Ski	World Cup Final
2024	23	141	92	—	—N/a	—N/a	—	—N/a
2025	24	8	5	—	—N/a	—N/a	11	—N/a
2026	25	6	3rd place, bronze medalist(s)	119	—N/a	—N/a	18	—N/a

==== Individual podiums ====
- 2 podiums – (2 WC)

No.	Season	Date	Location	Race	Level	Place
1	2025–26	7 December 2025	Trondheim, Norway	10 km Individual F	World Cup	2nd
2	2025–26	20 March 2026	(United States) Lake Placid, USA	10 km Individual C	World Cup	2nd
