= Anton Grahn =

Swedish cross-country skier (born 2004)

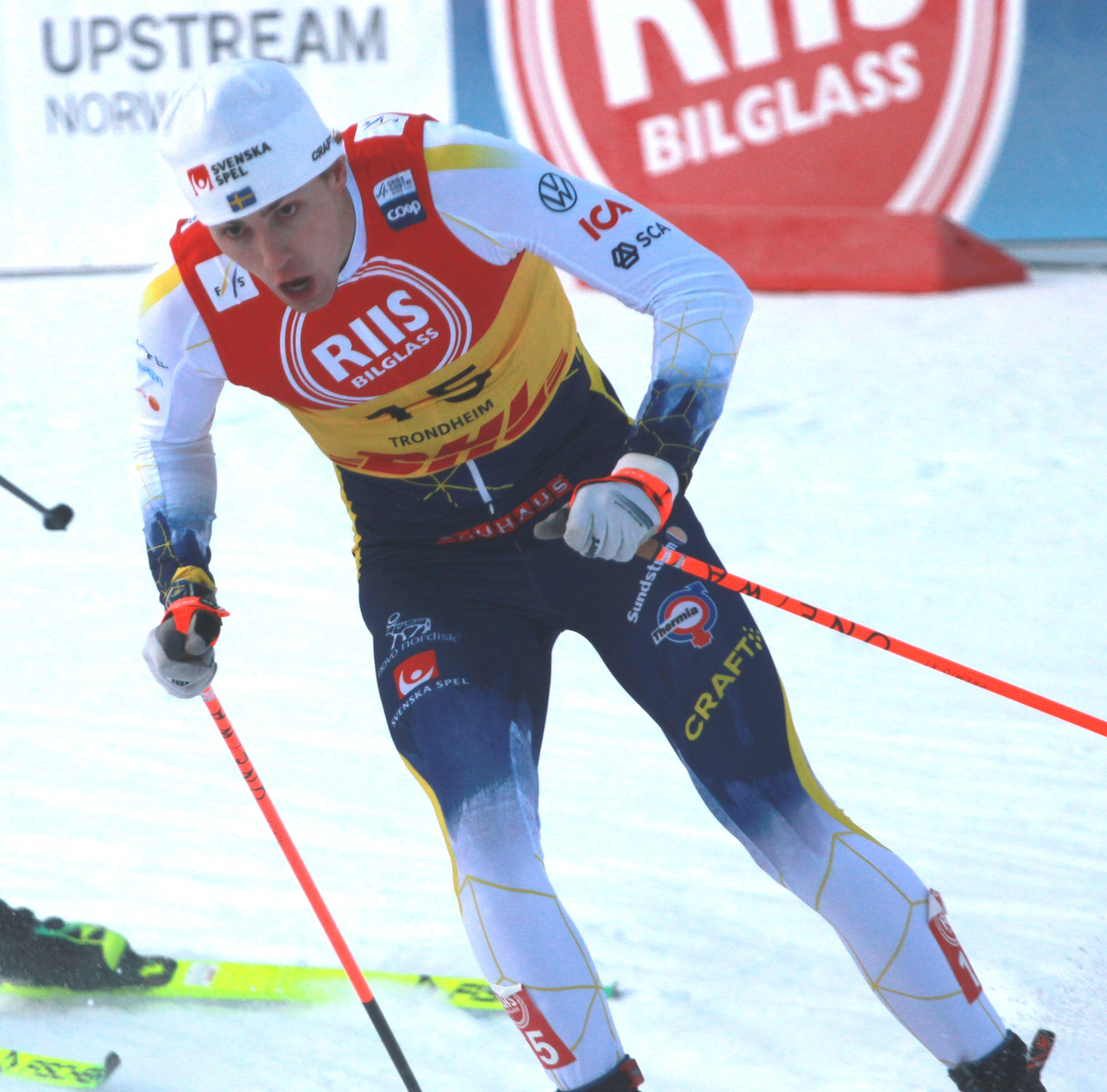

Personal information
- Nationality: Sweden
- Born: 2 November 2004 (age 21) Jönköping, Sweden
- Height: 199 cm (6 ft 6 in)

Sport
- Sport: Skiing
- Club: IFK Mora SK

World Cup career
- Seasons: 3 – (2024–present)
- Indiv. starts: 26
- Indiv. podiums: 2
- Team starts: 2
- Overall titles: 0
- Discipline titles: 0
Medal record
Men's cross-country skiing
Representing Sweden
World U23 Championships
Gold medal – first place	2025 Schilpario	Sprint classical
Bronze medal – third place	2026 Lillehammer	10 km classical
Junior World Championships
Gold medal – first place	2023 Whistler	Sprint classical
Gold medal – first place	2024 Planica	4 × 5 km relay
Silver medal – second place	2024 Planica	Sprint freestyle

Anton Grahn (born 2 November 2004) is a Swedish cross-country skier who competed at the 2026 Winter Olympics. He is a former Junior and U23 champion in the Sprint classical event. He reached his first World Cup podium in Val di Fiemme claiming bronze in the sprint classical event.

== Cross-country skiing results ==
All results are sourced from the International Ski Federation (FIS).

=== Olympic Games ===
Year	Age	10 km individual	20 km skiathlon	50 km mass start	Sprint	4 × 7.5 km relay	Team sprint
2026	21	—	—	—	10	—	—

=== World Cup ===
==== Season standings ====
Season	Age	Discipline standings				Ski Tour standings
Season	Age	Overall	Distance	Sprint	U23	Tour de Ski
2024	19	122	—	61	22	—
2025	20	97	—	40	11	—
2026	21	33	111	10	5	53

==== Individual podiums ====
- 2 podiums – (1 WC, 1 SWC)

No.	Season	Date	Location	Race	Level	Place
1	2025–26	3 January 2026	Val di Fiemme, Italy	Sprint C	Stage World Cup	3rd
2	2025–26	21 March 2026	Lake Placid, United States	Sprint F	World Cup	3rd
