= Ansgar Evensen =

Norwegian cross-country skier (born 2000)

Personal information
- Nationality: Norway
- Born: 18 April 2000 (age 26)

Sport
- Sport: Cross-country skiing
- Club: Vind IL

World Cup career
- Seasons: 2023–present
- Indiv. starts: 41
- Indiv. podiums: 5
- Indiv. wins: 1
Medal record
Men's cross-country skiing
Representing Norway
U23 World Championships
Gold medal – first place	2023 Whistler	Sprint classical
Junior World Championships
Gold medal – first place	2020 Oberwiesenthal	Sprint freestyle
Silver medal – second place	2019 Lahti	Sprint classical
- Updated on 22 March 2026

Ansgar Evensen (born 18 April 2000) is a Norwegian cross-country skier.

== Career ==
Having captured silver the prior year, Evensen became the Junior sprint champion in 2020 in Junior Worlds in Oberwiesenthal. He went on to capture the U23 world title in the 2023 Whistler sprint event. His first World Cup podium finish came the following year in the classic sprint final in Oberhof. And then in 2026, he achieved his first World Cup win at the Drammen classical sprint, taking advantage of a semi-final collision between Ben Ogden, Aron Åkre Rysstad, and Johannes Høsflot Klæbo.

== Cross-country skiing results ==
All results are sourced from the International Ski Federation (FIS).

=== World Cup ===
==== Season standings ====
Season	Age	Discipline standings				Ski Tour standings		
Season	Age	Overall	Distance	Sprint	U23	Nordic Opening	Tour de Ski	World Cup Final
2023	22	50	22	—	8	—N/a	—	—N/a
2024	23	42	16	—	—N/a	—N/a	49	—N/a
2025	24	47	16	—	—N/a	—N/a	—	—N/a
2026	25	24	4	—	—N/a	—N/a	—	—N/a

==== Individual podiums ====
- 1 victories – (1 WC)
- 5 podiums – (5 WC)

No.	Season	Date	Location	Race	Level	Place
1	2023–24	19 January 2024	Oberhof, Germany	1.3 km Sprint C	World Cup	2nd
2	2024–25	18 January 2025	Les Rousses, France	1.3 km Sprint C	World Cup	2nd
3	2024–25	1 February 2025	Cogne, Italy	1.3 km Sprint C	World Cup	2nd
4	2025–26	29 November 2025	Ruka, Finland	1.4 km Sprint C	World Cup	3rd
5	2025–26	12 March 2026	Drammen, Norway	1.2 km Sprint C	World Cup	1st
