= Savelii Korostelev =

Russian cross-country skier (born 2003)

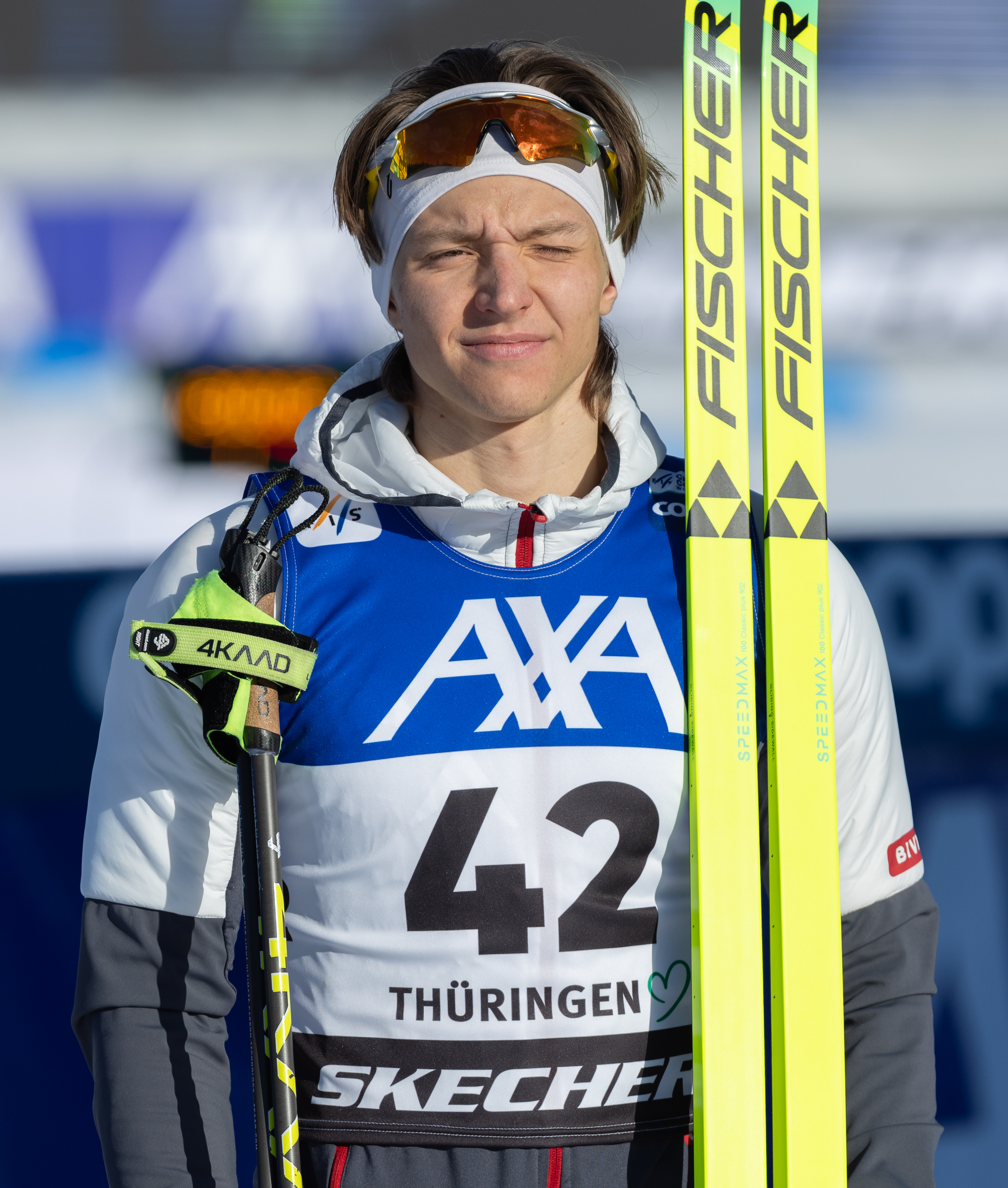

Personal information
- Native name: Савелий Павлович Коростелёв
- Other names: Saveliy Korostelev
- Born: 30 November 2003 (age 22) Perm, Russia

Sport
- Sport: Cross-country skiing
Medal record
Men's cross-country skiing
Representing Individual Neutral Athletes
World U23 Championships
Silver medal – second place	2026 Lillehammer	20 km freestyle
Representing Russia
World Junior Championships
Gold medal – first place	2022 Zakopane	10 km classical
Gold medal – first place	2022 Zakopane	4 × 5 km relay
Silver medal – second place	2022 Zakopane	30 km mass start freestyle

Savelii Pavlovich Korostelev (Russian: Савелий Павлович Коростелёв, born 30 November 2003) is a Russian cross-country skier.

== Career ==
In December 2025, Korostelev was selected to represent Individual Neutral Athletes at the 2026 Winter Olympics. On 8 February 2026, he competed in the 20 kilometre skiathlon and finished in fourth place with a time of 23:24.7.

== Cross-country skiing results ==
All results are sourced from the International Ski Federation (FIS).

=== Olympic Games ===
Year	Age	10 km individual	20 km skiathlon	50 km mass start	Sprint	4 × 7.5/10 km relay	Team sprint
2026	22	15	4	5	35	—	—

=== World Cup ===
==== Season standings ====
Season	Age	Discipline standings				Ski Tour standings			
Season	Age	Overall	Distance	Sprint	U23	Nordic Opening	Tour de Ski	Ski Tour 2020	World Cup Final
2026	22	15	11	79	2nd place, silver medalist(s)	—N/a	8	—N/a	—N/a

=== Individual podiums ===
- 1 podium – (1 WC)

No.	Season	Date	Location	Race	Level	Place
1	2025–26	8 March 2026	Lahti, Finland	10 km Individual C	World Cup	3rd
