= Karoline Simpson-Larsen =

Norwegian cross-country skier (born 1997)

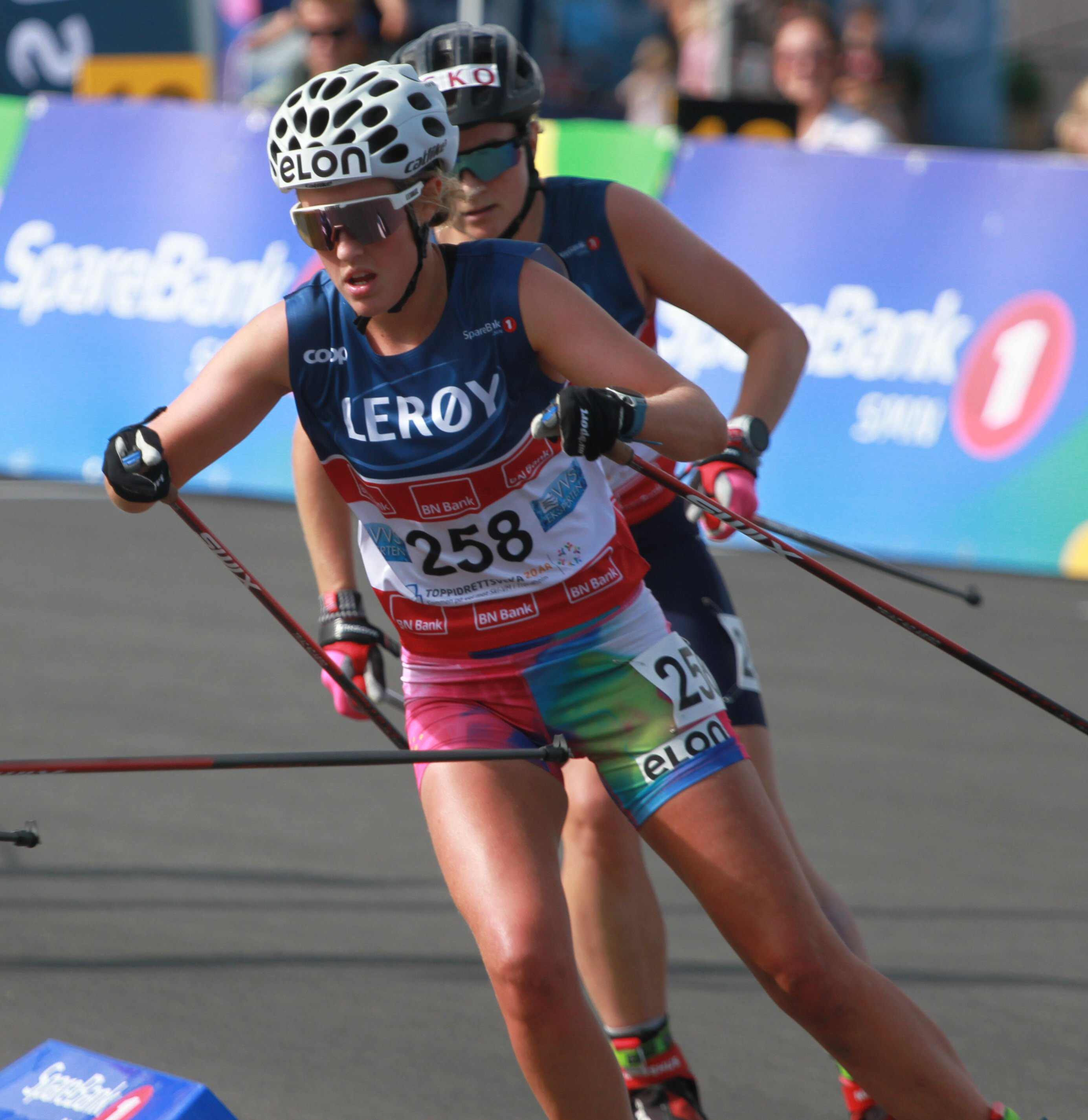

Personal information
- Nationality: Norway
- Born: 4 August 1997 (age 28) Rollag, Norway

Sport
- Sport: Skiing
- Club: Il Vargar

World Cup career
- Seasons: 8 – (2019–present)
- Indiv. starts: 23
- Indiv. podiums: 2
- Indiv. wins: 2
- Overall titles: 0 – (62nd in 2025)
Medal record
Women's cross-country skiing
Representing Norway
Olympic Games
Gold medal – first place	2026 Milano Cortina	4 × 7.5 km relay
- Updated on 4 January 2026

Karoline Simpson-Larsen (born 7 August 1997) is a Norwegian cross-country skier.

== Career ==
In December 2025, Simpson-Larsen won her first FIS Cross-Country World Cup race, a 10-kilometre (6.2 mi) Individual Start Free in Davos; and her second win occurred in the same 2025–26 World Cup series on 4 January 2026, in Val di Fiemme, where she won a 10-kilometre (6.2 mi) Mass Start Climb.
