= Julie Bjervig Drivenes =

Norwegian cross-country skier (born 1999)

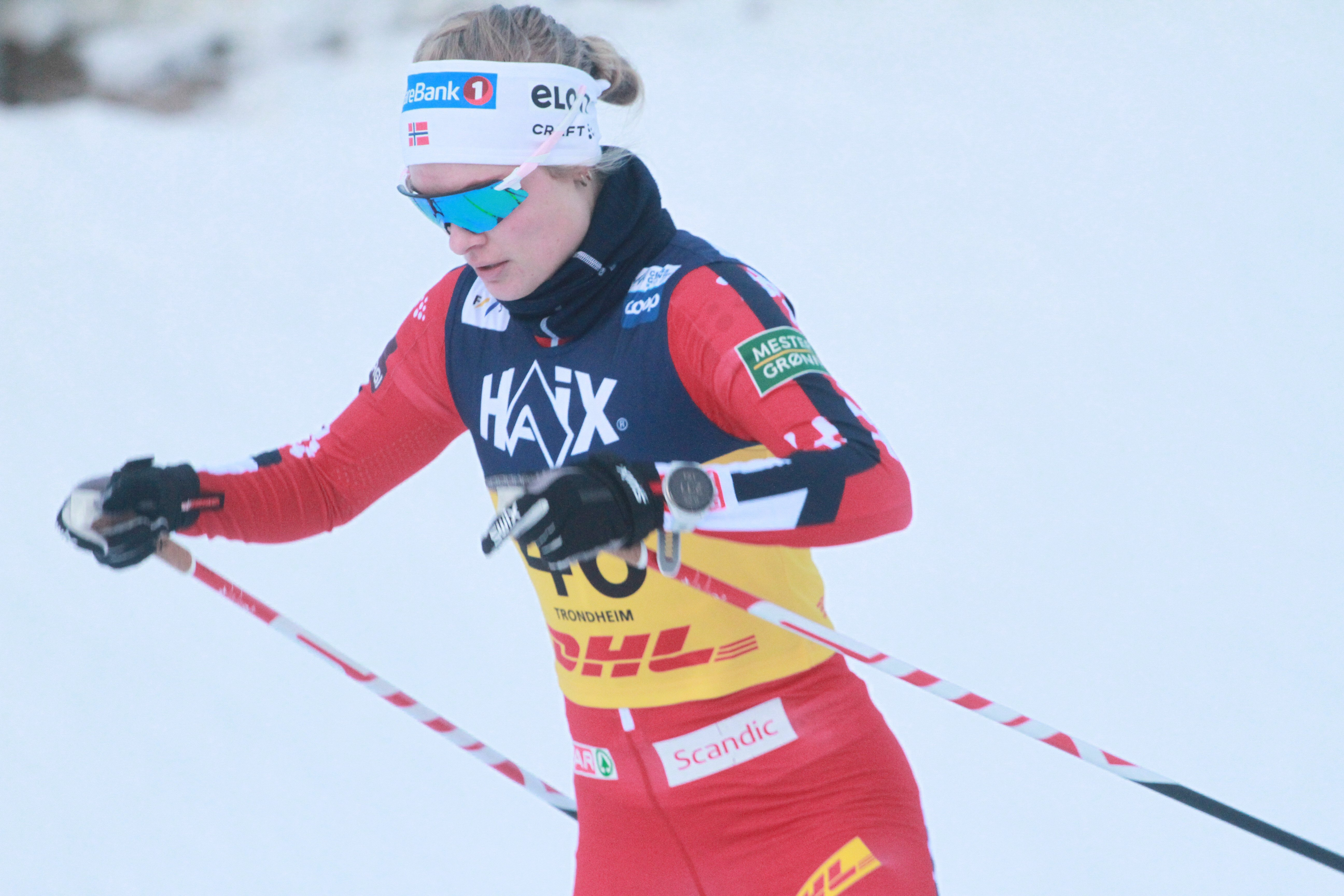
- Drivenes in 2025

Personal information
- Nationality: Norway
- Born: 23 September 1999 (age 27)

Sport
- Sport: Skiing

World Cup career
- Seasons: 3 – (2023–present)
- Indiv. starts: 5
- Team podiums: 1
- Updated on 10 February 2026

Julie Bjervig Drivenes (born 23 September 1999) is a Norwegian cross-country skier who represented Norway at the 2026 Winter Olympics.

== Career ==
During the 2025–26 FIS Cross-Country World Cup, Drivenes earned her first career World Cup podium on 23 January 2026 in the team event, along with Astrid Øyre Slind. In January 2026, she was selected to represent Norway at the 2026 Winter Olympics.
