= Helen Hoffmann =

German cross-country skier (born 2002)

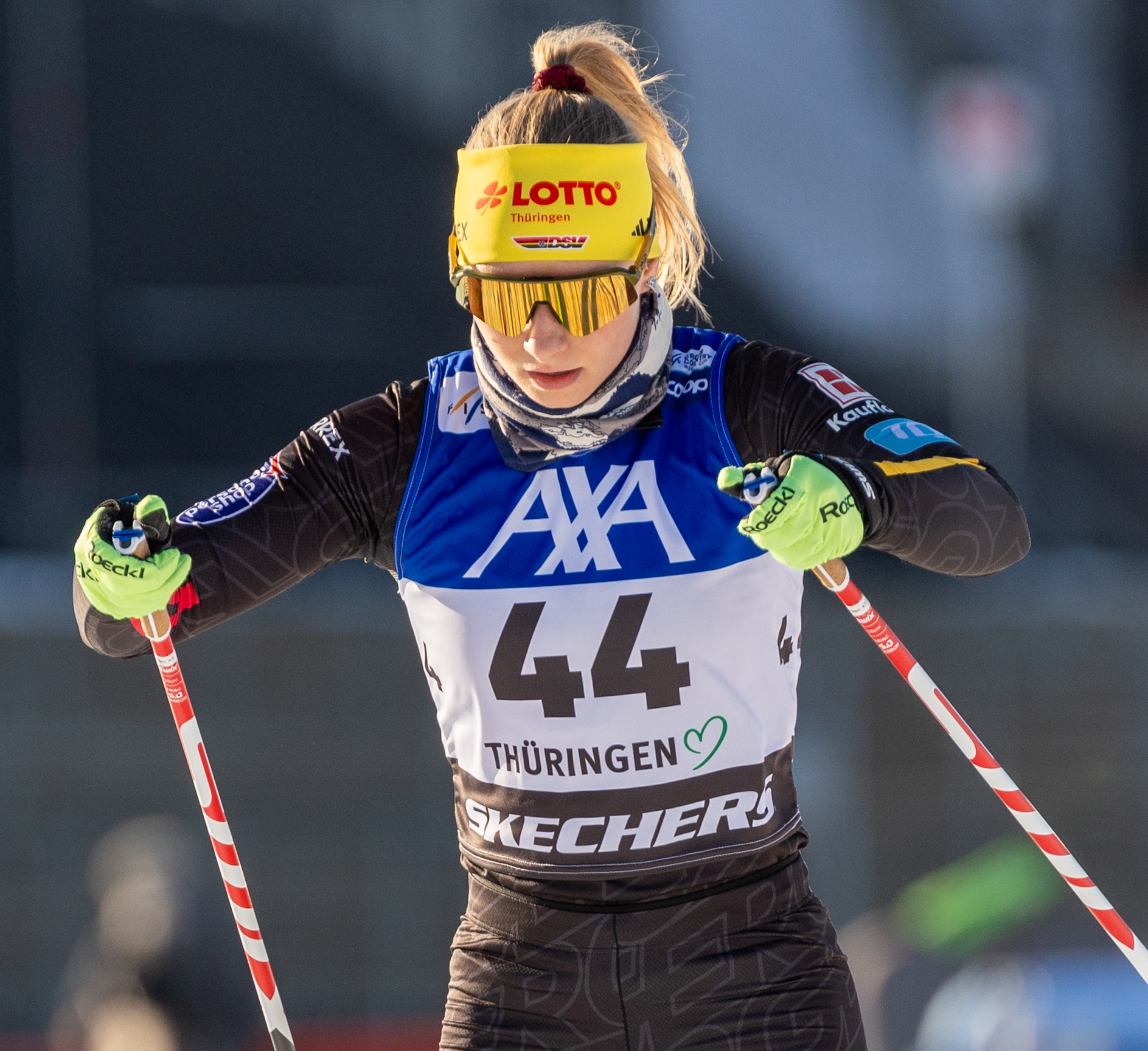
- Hoffmann in 2026

Personal information
- Nationality: Germany
- Born: 7 February 2002 (age 24) Altötting, Germany

Sport
- Sport: Skiing

World Cup career
- Seasons: 2 – (2025–present)
- Indiv. starts: 9
- Team starts: 1
Medal record
Women's cross-country skiing
Representing Germany
World Championships
Bronze medal – third place	2025 Trondheim	4 x 7.5 km relay
U23 World Championships
Gold medal – first place	2023 Whistler	10 km freestyle
Gold medal – first place	2024 Planica	10 km classical
Gold medal – first place	2025 Schilpario	10 km freestyle
Bronze medal – third place	2025 Schilpario	4 × 5 km relay
Junior World Championships
Gold medal – first place	2022 Zakopane	15 km mass start freestyle
Bronze medal – third place	2021 Vuokatti	15 km mass start classical
Bronze medal – third place	2022 Zakopane	4 × 3.3 km relay
- Updated on 31 January 2026

Helen Hoffmann (born 7 February 2002) is a German cross-country skier.

== Career ==
Hoffmann made her international debut for Germany at the 2019 European Youth Olympic Winter Festival and won a bronze medal in the 5 kilometre freestyle event. She then represented Germany at the 2020 Winter Youth Olympics. She made her Junior World Championships debut in 2021 and won a bronze medal in the 15 kilometre mass start classical. She again competed at the 2022 Nordic Junior World Ski Championships and won a gold medal in the 15 kilometre mass start freestyle and a bronze medal in the 4 × 3.3 kilometre relay.

She competed in the under-23 category at the 2023 Nordic Junior World Ski Championships and won a gold medal in the 10 kilometre freestyle. She repeated as U23 champion in the 10 kilometre event in 2024 and 2025.

Hoffmann finished the 2024–25 FIS Cross-Country World Cup as the under-23 winner with 564 points, winning the green bib. She competed at the FIS Nordic World Ski Championships 2025 and won a bronze medal in the 4 × 7.5 kilometre relay.

In January 2026, she was selected to represent Germany at the 2026 Winter Olympics.
