= Jules Chappaz =

French cross-country skier (born 1999)

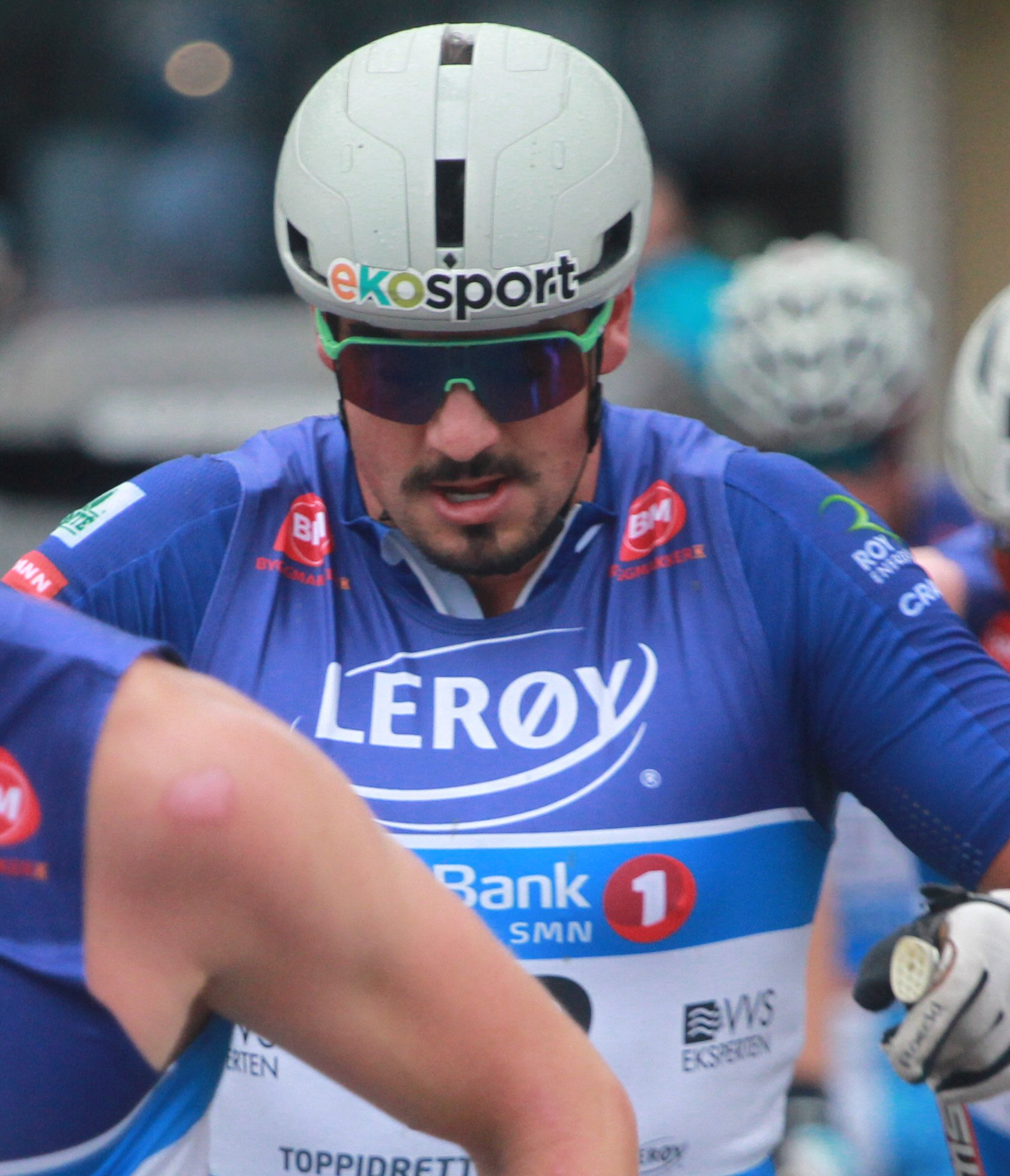

Personal information
- Nationality: France
- Born: 22 May 1999 (age 27) Annecy, France

Sport
- Sport: Skiing
- Club: Club des Sports La Clusaz

World Cup career
- Seasons: 7 – (2020–present)
- Indiv. starts: 94
- Indiv. podiums: 5
- Team starts: 10
- Team podiums: 2
- Overall titles: 0 – (14th in 2026)
- Discipline titles: 0
Medal record
Men's cross-country skiing
Representing France
World Championships
Bronze medal – third place	2023 Planica	Individual sprint
U23 World Championships
Silver medal – second place	2022 Lygna	4 × 5 km mixed relay
Junior World Championships
Gold medal – first place	2019 Lahti	10 km freestyle
- Updated on 22 March 2026

Jules Chappaz (born 4 March 1999) is a French cross-country skier. He won a bronze medal in the individual sprint at the FIS Nordic World Ski Championships 2023, which was his first time competing in a world championship. He also won the 10 km freestyle race at the 2019 Nordic Junior World Ski Championships.

== Cross-country skiing results ==
All results are sourced from the International Ski Federation (FIS).

=== Olympic Games ===
Year	Age	10 km individual	20 km skiathlon	50 km mass start	Sprint	4 × 7.5 km relay	Team sprint
2026	26	—	—	—	13	—	12

=== World Championships ===
Year	Age	15 km individual	30 km skiathlon	50 km mass start	Sprint	4 × 10 km relay	Team sprint
2023	23	—	—	—	Bronze	—	—
2025	25	—	—	—	4	—	5

=== World Cup ===
==== Season standings ====
Season	Age	Discipline standings				Ski Tour standings			
Season	Age	Overall	Distance	Sprint	U23	Nordic Opening	Tour de Ski	Ski Tour 2020	World Cup Final
2020	20	103	58	—	—	—	DNF	—	—N/a
2021	21	112	—	67	17	—	—	—N/a	—N/a
2022	22	99	—	55	18	18	—	—N/a	—N/a
2023	23	27	74	12	—N/a	—N/a	DNF	—N/a	—N/a
2024	24	24	31	17	—N/a	—N/a	38	—N/a	—N/a
2025	25	26	66	12	—N/a	—N/a	—	—N/a	—N/a
2026	26	14	58	5	—N/a	—N/a	13	—N/a	—N/a

==== Individual podiums ====
- 5 podiums – (3 WC, 2 SWC)

No.	Season	Date	Location	Race	Level	Place
1	2023–24	30 December 2023	Toblach, Italy	1.4 km Sprint F	Stage World Cup	2nd
2	2024–25	19 March 2025	Tallinn, Estonia	1.4 km Sprint F	World Cup	2nd
3	2024–25	21 March 2025	Lahti, Finland	1.5 km Sprint F	World Cup	2nd
4	2025–26	3 January 2026	Val di Fiemme, Italy	1.5 km Sprint C	Stage World Cup	2nd
5	2025–26	7 March 2026	Lahti, Finland	1.5 km Sprint F	World Cup	3rd

==== Team podiums ====
- 2 podiums – (2 TS)

No.	Season	Date	Location	Race	Level	Place	Teammate
1	2024–25	31 January 2025	Cogne, Italy	6 × 1.3 km Team Sprint C	World Cup	2nd	Jouve
2	2024–25	22 March 2025	Lahti, Finland	6 × 1.5 km Team Sprint F	World Cup	3rd	Jouve
