= Gus Schumacher (skier) =

American cross-country skier (born 2000)

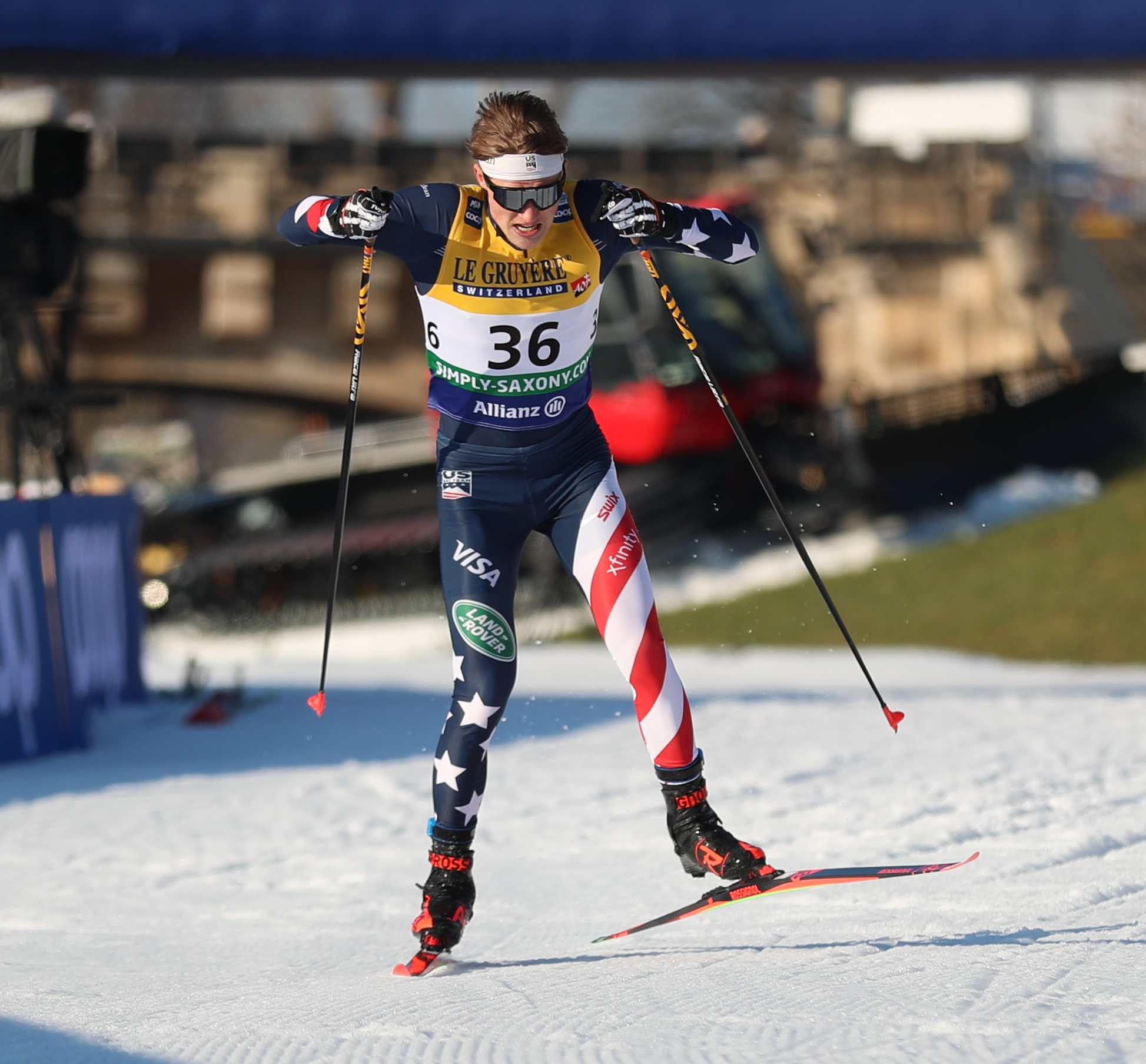
- Schumacher in 2020

Personal information
- Full name: August Schumacher
- Nationality: United States
- Born: July 25, 2000 (age 26) Madison, Wisconsin, U.S.

Sport
- Sport: Skiing
- Club: Alaska Pacific University Nordic Ski Center

World Cup career
- Seasons: 7 – (2019, 2021–present)
- Indiv. starts: 106
- Indiv. podiums: 3
- Indiv. wins: 2
- Team starts: 8
- Team podiums: 0
- Overall titles: 0 – (14th in 2025)
- Discipline titles: 0
Medal record
Men's cross-country skiing
Representing United States
Olympic Games
Silver medal – second place	2026 Milano Cortina	Team sprint
Junior World Championships
Gold medal – first place	2019 Lahti	4 × 5 km relay
Gold medal – first place	2020 Oberwiesenthal	10 km classical
Gold medal – first place	2020 Oberwiesenthal	4 × 5 km relay
Silver medal – second place	2018 Goms	4 × 5 km relay
- Updated on December 31, 2025

August "Gus" Schumacher (born July 25, 2000) is an American cross-country skier. In 2020, Schumacher became the first American to win a gold medal in an individual race at the Junior World Ski Championships. He competed in the 30 kilometre skiathlon at the 2022 Winter Olympics. Schumacher won the Men's 10 km freestyle race at the 2024 Stifel Loppet Cup in Minneapolis on February 18, 2024. His win marked the first time an American male skier had won an individual distance event since Bill Koch in 1983. At the 2026 Winter Olympics, he won a silver medal in the men's team sprint with teammate Ben Ogden.

== Early life ==
Schumacher was born in Madison, Wisconsin and grew up in Anchorage, Alaska. He learned to ski as soon as he could walk, using strap-on skis in his backyard. By the time he reached middle school, Schumacher had begun to show an interest in competitive racing. After moving through the ranks with the Anchorage Junior Nordic League, he joined the Alaska Winter Stars program. He graduated from Service High School in 2018 and enrolled as a part-time student at the University of Alaska Anchorage in pursuit of a Civil Engineering degree. He currently works part-time as an engineering consultant at HDR.

== Athletic career ==
=== High school and juniors ===
As a high school student, Schumacher trained with the Alaska Winter Stars. He swept both individual races at the Alaska state high school championships to claim the title of Skimeister, awarded to the skier with the best combined times, in both 2017 and 2018.

From 2015 to 2019, Schumacher competed at the Cross Country Junior National Championships with the Alaskan divisional team.

=== World Cup ===
As a 23-year old, Schumacher won the men's 10 kilometer final at the 2024 Stifel Loppet Cup in Minneapolis. He became the youngest American to win a World Cup cross-country skiing race, the first American man to win any World Cup race since Simi Hamilton in 2013, and the first American man to win a distance race since Bill Koch in 1983.

While on break from the World Cup ski tour, Schumacher competed in the American Birkebeiner in Wisconsin, and won the men's 50 km freestyle race on February 24, 2024.

== Advocacy ==
In 2022, Schumacher lobbied Congress as a member of the Protect Our Winters Athlete Alliance. On March 20, 2024, Schumacher testified at a U.S. Senate Budget Committee hearing titled “Recreation at Risk: The Nature of Climate Costs” where he shared firsthand experiences of climate change throughout his skiing career.

== Cross-country skiing results ==
All results are sourced from the International Ski Federation (FIS).

=== Olympic Games ===
Year	Age	Individual	Skiathlon	Mass start	Sprint	Relay	Team sprint
2022	21	48	39	—^{[a]}	—	9	—
2026	25	39	24	13	31	6	2nd place, silver medalist(s)

^{a} Distance reduced to 30 km due to weather conditions.

=== World Championships ===
Year	Age	individual	skiathlon	50 km mass start	Sprint	4 × 10 km relay	Team sprint
2021	20	51	—	29	—	8	14
2023	22	19	38	28	—	7	—
2025	24	13	9	26	27		6

=== World Cup ===
==== Season standings ====
Season	Age	Discipline standings				Ski Tour standings		
Season	Age	Overall	Distance	Sprint	U23	Nordic Opening	Tour de Ski	World Cup Final
2019	18	NC	NC	NC	NC	—	—	52
2021	20	30	25	65	2nd place, silver medalist(s)	32	18	—N/a
2022	21	79	45	NC	13	—N/a	DNF	—N/a
2023	22	62	43	NC	9	—N/a	35	—N/a
2024	23	15	16	27	—N/a	—N/a	DNF	—N/a
2025	24	14	14	30	—N/a	—N/a	DNF	—N/a
2026	25	7	12	16	—N/a	—N/a	7	—N/a

==== Individual podiums ====
- 2 victories – (1 WC, 1 SWC)
- 4 podiums – (3 WC, 1 SWC)

No.	Season	Date	Location	Race	Level	Place
1	2023–24	February 18, 2024	(United States) Minneapolis, USA - Stifel Loppet Cup	10 km Individual F	World Cup	1st
2	2024–25	February 16, 2025	Falun, Sweden	20 km Mass Start F	World Cup	2nd
3	2025–26	December 31, 2025	Toblach, Italy	5 km Heat Mass Start F	Stage World Cup	1st
4	2025–26	January 24, 2026	Goms, Switzerland	1.5 km Sprint C	World Cup	2nd

==== Team podiums ====
- 1 podium – (1 WC)

No.	Season	Date	Location	Race	Level	Place
1	2025–26	January 23, 2026	Goms, Switzerland	6 × 1.5 km Team Sprint F	World Cup	3rd
