= Ski jumping at the 2024 Winter Youth Olympics =

Ski jumping at the IV Winter Youth Olympic Games
- Venue: Alpensia Ski Jumping Centre
- Dates: 20–21 January
- Competitors: 72 from 21 nations

Ski jumping at the 2024 Winter Youth Olympics took place from 20 to 21 January 2024 at the Alpensia Ski Jumping Centre, Daegwallyeong-myeon, South Korea.

== Schedule ==
All times are in KST (UTC+9)

Date	Time	Event
20 January	10:00	Women's normal hill individual
20 January	13:30	Men's normal hill individual
21 January	12:30	Mixed team normal hill

== Medal summary ==
Rank	Nation	Gold	Silver	Bronze	Total
1	Slovenia	2	0	0	2
2	Kazakhstan	1	0	0	1
3	Austria	0	1	1	2
3	Norway	0	1	1	2
5	United States	0	1	0	1
6	Poland	0	0	1	1
Totals (6 entries)		3	3	3	9

=== Medalists ===
Event	Gold		Silver		Bronze	
Men's individual normal hill	Ilya Mizernykh; Kazakhstan	214.0	Nikolaus Humml; Austria	210.7	Łukasz Łukaszczyk; Poland	209.7
Women's individual normal hill	Taja Bodlaj; Slovenia	215.7	Josie Johnson; United States	207.2	Ingvild Synnøve Midtskogen; Norway	204.7
Mixed team normal hill	Slovenia; Ajda Košnjek; Urban Šimnic; Taja Bodlaj; Enej Faletič	893.7	Norway; Kjersti Græsli; Oddvar Gunnerød; Ingvild Synnøve Midtskogen; Mats Strandbraaten	818.3	Austria; Sara Pokorny; Nikolaus Humml; Meghann Wadsak; Lukas Haagen	775.0

== Qualification ==
NOCs can gain 2 quota places per gender by ranking in the Marc Hodler Trophy at the 2023 Nordic Junior World Ski Championships. Furthermore, the remaining NOCs would get quota places via the 2022–23 FIS Ski Jumping Continental Cup and the 2022–23 FIS Ski Jumping FIS Cup.

=== Summary ===
This is the quota list as of December 18, 2023.

NOC	Men's	Women's	Total
Austria	2	2	4
Canada	1	~~1~~ 0	1
China	2	2	4
Czech Republic	2	2	4
Estonia	1	0	1
Finland	2	2	4
France	2	2	4
Georgia	1	1	2
Germany	2	2	4
Italy	2	2	4
Japan	2	2	4
Kazakhstan	2	2	4
Norway	2	2	4
Poland	2	2	4
Romania	2	2	4
Slovakia	2	~~2~~ 1	3
Slovenia	2	2	4
South Korea	2	~~2~~ 0	2
Switzerland	2	~~2~~ 1	3
Ukraine	2	2	4
United States	2	2	4
Total: 21 NOCs	39	33	72

- Bulgaria and Latvia declined all their quotas

=== Next eligible NOC per event ===
A country can be eligible for more than one quota spot per event in the reallocation process. Bolded NOCs have accepted quotas while NOCs with a strike through have already passed.

Men's	Women's
~~Georgia~~	
