= Sofie Krehl =

German cross-country skier (born 1995)

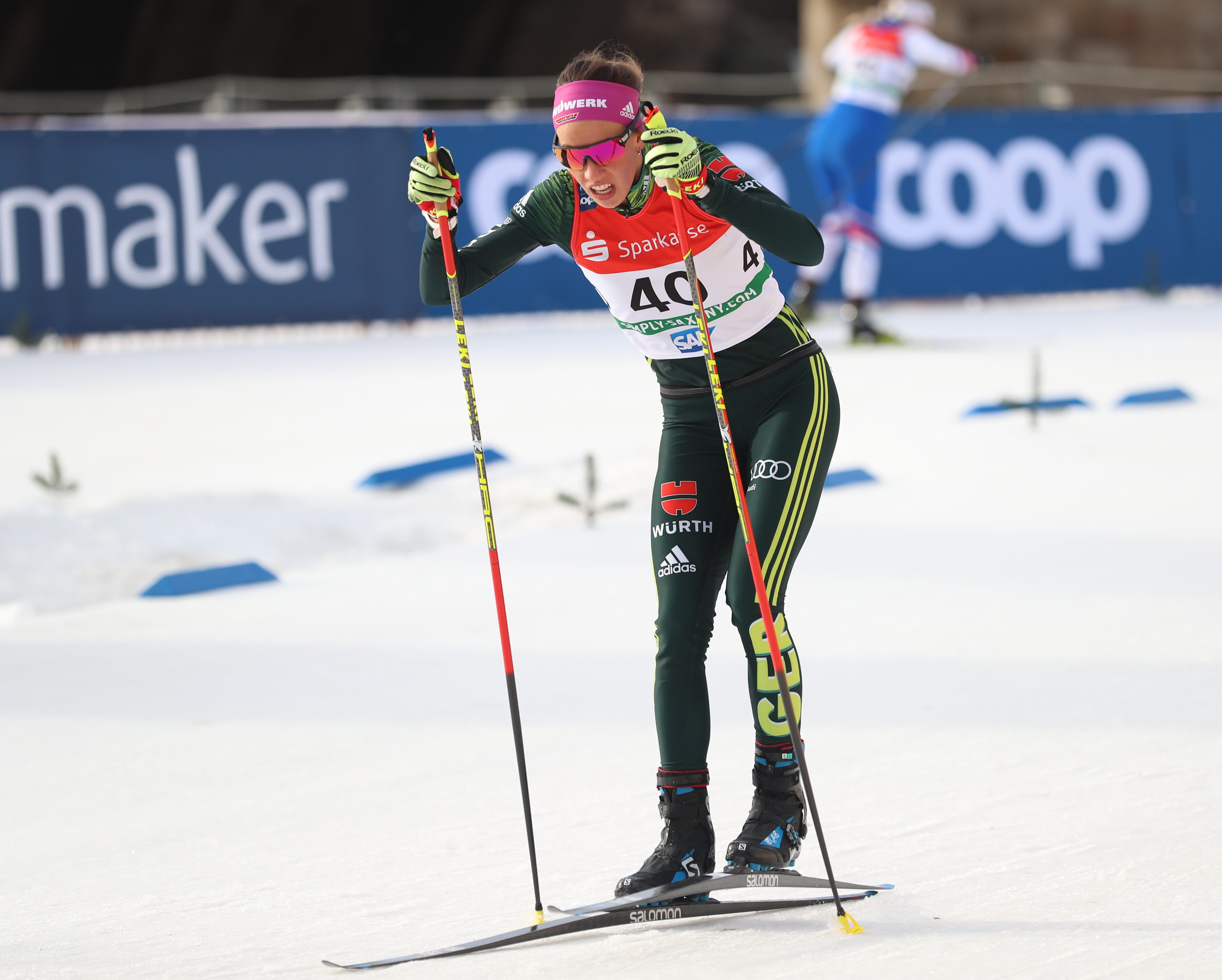
- Krehl in 2019

Personal information
- Nationality: Germany
- Born: 22 September 1995 (age 30) Kempten, Germany
- Height: 1.69 m (5 ft 7 in)

Sport
- Sport: Skiing
- Club: SC Oberstdorf

World Cup career
- Seasons: 8 – (2017, 2019–present)
- Indiv. starts: 113
- Indiv. podiums: 0
- Team starts: 14
- Team podiums: 0
- Overall titles: 0 – (34th in 2023)
- Discipline titles: 0
Medal record
Women's cross-country skiing
Representing Germany
Olympic Games
Silver medal – second place	2022 Beijing	4 × 5 km relay
Junior World Championships
Bronze medal – third place	2015 Almaty	4 × 3.33 km relay
- Updated on 1 March 2025

Sofie Krehl (born 22 September 1995) is a German cross-country skier who represents the club SC Oberstdorf.

She competed at the FIS Nordic World Ski Championships 2017 in Lahti, Finland.

== Cross-country skiing results ==
All results are sourced from the International Ski Federation (FIS).

=== Olympic Games ===
Year	Age	10 km individual	15 km skiathlon	30 km mass start	Sprint	4 × 5 km relay	Team sprint
2022	26	—	17	—	11	Silver	—

=== World Championships ===
Year	Age	10 km individual	15 km skiathlon	30 km mass start	Sprint	4 × 5 km relay	Team sprint
2017	21	—	16	—	17	—	—
2019	23	—	25	—	28	—	—
2021	25	—	—	22	23	—	9
2023	27	31	—	—	31	—	—
2025	29	—	—	25	26	—	—

=== World Cup ===
==== Season standings ====
Season	Age	Discipline standings				Ski Tour standings			
Season	Age	Overall	Distance	Sprint	U23	Nordic Opening	Tour de Ski	Ski Tour 2020	World Cup Final
2017	21	72	64	62	11	—	DNF	—N/a	—
2019	23	88	NC	54	—N/a	—	—	—N/a	—
2020	24	57	57	40	—N/a	31	DNF	—	—N/a
2021	25	51	61	23	—N/a	37	DNF	—N/a	—N/a
2022	26	45	41	41	—N/a	—N/a	26	—N/a	—N/a
2023	27	34	36	21	—N/a	—N/a	DNF	—N/a	—N/a
