= Moa Ilar =

Swedish cross-country skier (born 1997)

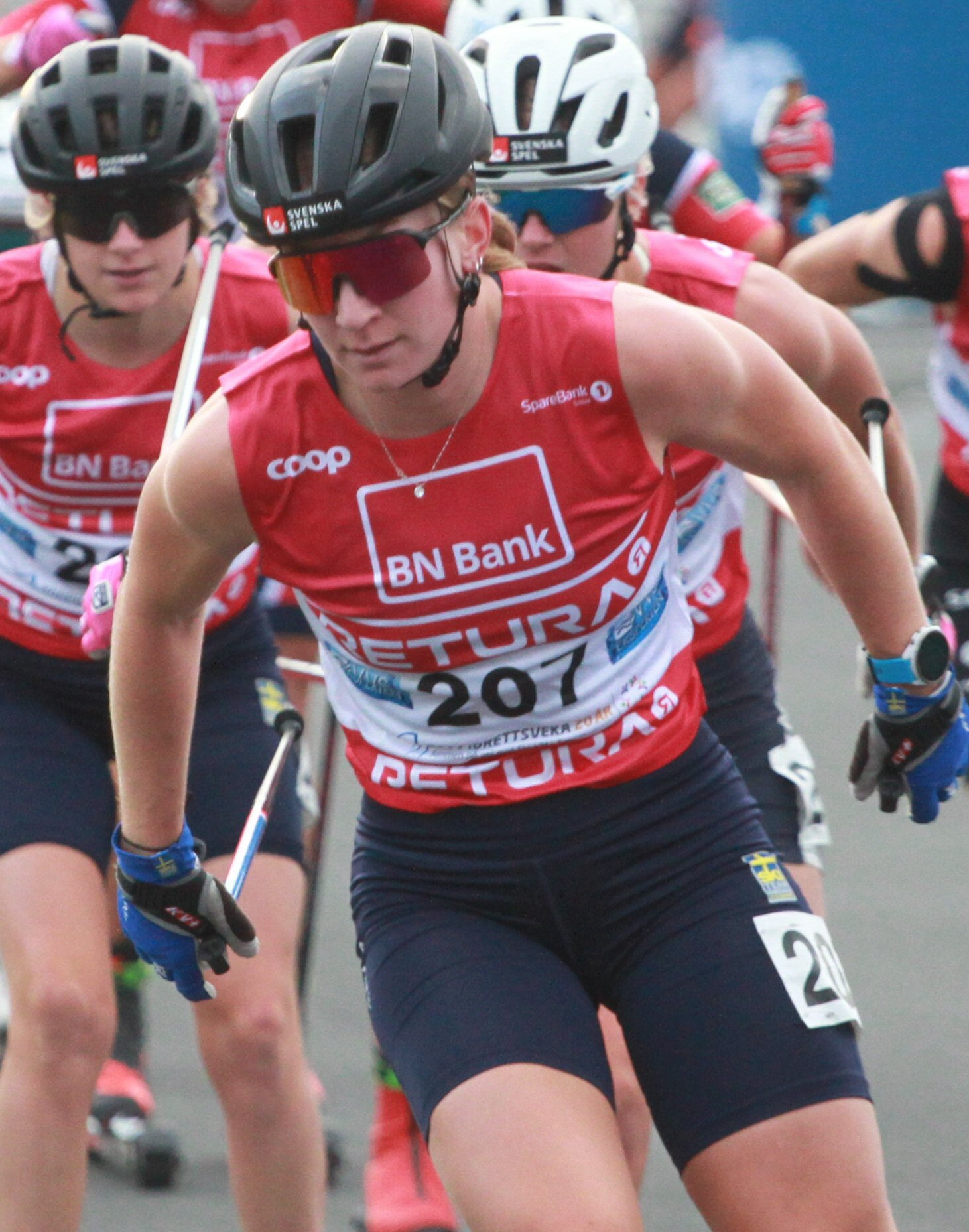

Personal information
- Full name: Moa Maria Ilar
- Nationality: Sweden
- Born: 6 July 1997 (age 29) Vansbro, Sweden

Sport
- Sport: Skiing
- Club: Falun-Borlänge SK

World Cup career
- Seasons: 6 – (2019–present)
- Indiv. starts: 106
- Indiv. podiums: 9
- Indiv. wins: 3
- Team starts: 8
- Team podiums: 5
- Team wins: 3
- Overall titles: 0 – (12th in 2025)
- Discipline titles: 0
- Updated on 1 March 2026

Moa Maria Ilar (née Olsson; born 6 July 1997) is a Swedish cross-country skier. A member of the Swedish National Cross-Country Team since 2022, she made her World Cup debut in 2019, in Ulricehamn, Sweden.

Ilar claimed her first World Cup victory on 26 November 2023, winning the 20 km freestyle mass start in Rukatunturi, Finland.

Ilar placed eleventh in the Women's 10 kilometre freestyle race at the 2026 Winter Olympics.

== Cross-country skiing results ==
All results are sourced from the International Ski Federation (FIS).

=== Olympic Games ===
Year	Age	10 km Individual	15/20 km skiathlon	30/50 km mass start	Sprint	4 × 5/7.5 km relay	Team sprint
2022	24	—	45	—	—	—	—
2026	28	11	14	—	—	—	—

=== World Championships ===
Year	Age	10 km individual	15/20 km skiathlon	30/50 km mass start	Sprint	4 × 5/7.5 km relay	Team sprint
2023	25	—	35	—	—	—	—
2025	27	12	17	14	—	—	—

=== World Cup ===
==== Season standings ====
Season	Age	Discipline standings				Ski Tour standings			
Season	Age	Overall	Distance	Sprint	U23	Nordic Opening	Tour de Ski	Ski Tour 2020	World Cup Final
2019	21	NC	NC	—	NC	—	—	—N/a	—
2020	22	103	70	NC	26	—	—	—	—N/a
2021	23	70	89	52	—N/a	—	36	—N/a	—N/a
2022	24	34	17	52	—N/a	—N/a	—	—N/a	—N/a
2023	25	28	17	40	—N/a	—N/a	29	—N/a	—N/a
2024	26	15	14	37	—N/a	—N/a	19	—N/a	—N/a
2025	27	12	10	40	—N/a	—N/a	14	—N/a	—N/a
2026	28	2nd place, silver medalist(s)	2nd place, silver medalist(s)	8	—N/a	—N/a	8	—N/a	—N/a

==== Individual podiums ====
- 3 victories – (2 WC)
- 9 podiums – (7 WC, 2 SWC)

No.	Season	Date	Location	Race	Level	Place
1	2023–24	26 November 2023	Rukatunturi, Finland	20 km Mass Start F	World Cup	1st
2	2023–24	2 December 2023	Gällivare, Sweden	10 km Individual F	World Cup	3rd
3	2024–25	16 March 2025	Oslo, Norway	10 km Individual F	World Cup	1st
4	2025–26	28 November 2025	Rukatunturi, Finland	10 km Individual C	World Cup	3rd
5	2025–26	7 December 2025	Trondheim, Norway	10 km Individual F	World Cup	2nd
6	2025–26	14 December 2025	Davos, Switzerland	10 km Individual F	World Cup	2nd
7	2025–26	31 December 2025	Toblach, Italy	5 km Heat Mass Start F	Stage World Cup	3rd
8	2025–26	1 January 2026	Toblach, Italy	20 km Pursuit C	Stage World Cup	2nd
9	2025–26	18 January 2026	Oberhof, Germany	10 km Individual C	World Cup	1st

==== Team podiums ====
- 3 victories – (3 WC)
- 5 podiums – (5 RL)

No.	Season	Date	Location	Race	Level	Place	Teammates
1	2021–22	5 December 2021	Lillehammer, Norway	4 × 5 km Relay C/F	World Cup	2nd	Ribom / Karlsson / Andersson
2	2022–23	5 February 2023	Toblach, Italy	4 × 7.5 km Relay C/F	World Cup	2nd	Ribom / Andersson / Sundling
3	2022–23	19 March 2023	Falun, Sweden	4 × 5 km Mixed Relay C/F	World Cup	1st	Halfvarsson / Anger / Sundling
4	2023–24	3 December 2023	Gällivare, Sweden	4 × 7.5 km Relay C/F	World Cup	1st	Lundgren / Ribom / Andersson
5	2024–25	24 January 2025	Engadin, Switzerland	4 × 5 km Mixed Relay C/F	World Cup	1st	Burman / Ribom / Anger
