= FIS Nordic World Ski Championships 2025 – Women's 20 kilometre skiathlon =

Women's 20 kilometre skiathlon at the FIS Nordic World Ski Championships 2025
- Venue: Granåsen Ski Centre
- Location: Trondheim, Norway
- Dates: 26 February (qualification); 2 March
- Competitors: 60 from 23 nations
- Winning time: 47:57.1

Medalists
gold medal	Ebba Andersson	Sweden
silver medal	Therese Johaug	Norway
bronze medal	Jonna Sundling	Sweden

The Women's 20 kilometre skiathlon competition at the FIS Nordic World Ski Championships 2025 was held on 26 February and 2 March 2025.

== Results ==
The race was started at 14:00. The race was very close, and the winner was decided by photo finish.

Rank	Bib	Athlete	Country	Time	Deficit
1st place, gold medalist(s)	4	Ebba Andersson	Sweden	47:57.1	
2nd place, silver medalist(s)	7	Therese Johaug	Norway	47:57.1	+0.0
3rd place, bronze medalist(s)	17	Jonna Sundling	Sweden	48:07.3	+10.2
4	16	Frida Karlsson	Sweden	48:07.6	+10.5
5	6	Heidi Weng	Norway	48:08.1	+11.0
6	27	Nadja Kälin	Switzerland	49:13.2	+1:16.1
7	11	Krista Pärmäkoski	Finland	49:13.5	+1:16.4
8	2	Astrid Øyre Slind	Norway	49:23.7	+1:26.6
9	3	Victoria Carl	Germany	49:41.3	+1:44.2
10	9	Kristin Austgulen Fosnæs	Norway	49:41.9	+1:44.8
11	18	Emma Ribom	Sweden	49:59.6	+2:02.5
12	15	Helen Hoffmann	Germany	49:59.9	+2:02.8
13	1	Jessie Diggins	United States	49:59.9	+2:02.8
14	21	Nadine Fähndrich	Switzerland	50:01.0	+2:03.9
15	12	Flora Dolci	France	50:02.9	+2:05.8
16	5	Teresa Stadlober	Austria	50:05.1	+2:08.0
17	10	Moa Ilar	Sweden	50:38.1	+2:41.0
18	13	Kateřina Janatová	Czech Republic	51:02.2	+3:05.1
19	25	Anja Weber	Switzerland	51:02.3	+3:05.2
20	8	Pia Fink	Germany	51:03.2	+3:06.1
21	26	Katherine Sauerbrey	Germany	51:03.7	+3:06.6
22	33	Anna Comarella	Italy	51:16.0	+3:18.9
23	14	Sophia Laukli	United States	51:16.8	+3:19.7
24	29	Anja Mandeljc	Slovenia	51:40.7	+3:43.6
25	30	Masae Tsuchiya	Japan	51:41.9	+3:44.8
26	22	Julia Kern	United States	51:46.5	+3:49.4
27	35	Jasmin Kahara	Finland	51:46.6	+3:49.5
28	32	Vilma Ryytty	Finland	51:48.6	+3:51.5
29	28	Martina Di Centa	Italy	51:55.3	+3:58.2
30	24	Liliane Gagnon	Canada	52:12.7	+4:15.6
31	36	Keidy Kaasiku	Estonia	52:14.1	+4:17.0
32	34	Maria Gismondi	Italy	52:15.9	+4:18.8
33	23	Marina Kälin	Switzerland	52:17.9	+4:20.8
34	40	Katharina Brudermann	Austria	52:27.4	+4:30.3
35	31	Kaidy Kaasiku	Estonia	52:14.1	+4:51.0
36	20	Caterina Ganz	Italy	52:55.4	+4:58.3
37	38	Chika Kobayashi	Japan	53:07.5	+5:10.4
38	47	Rosie Fordham	Australia	53:13.4	+5:16.3
39	37	Gina del Rio	Andorra	53:19.8	+5:22.7
40	43	Alayna Sonnesyn	United States	53:26.3	+5:29.2
41	39	Katri Lylynperä	Finland	53:26.6	+5:29.5
42	46	Izabela Marcisz	Poland	53:26.8	+5:29.7
43	45	Chika Honda	Japan	53:27.4	+5:30.3
44	44	Alison Mackie	Canada	53:34.1	+5:37.0
45	42	Barbora Havlíčková	Czech Republic	54:34.4	+6:37.3
46	41	Shiori Yokohama	Japan	54:44.3	+6:47.2
47	19	Katherine Stewart-Jones	Canada	54:52.0	+6:54.9
48	56	Sophia Tsu Velicer	Chinese Taipei	54:57.0	+6:59.9
49	50	Sonjaa Schmidt	Canada	55:41.2	+7:44.1
50	48	Nadezhda Stepashkina	Kazakhstan	56:00.2	+8:03.1
51	54	Tuva Bygrave	Australia	56:00.2	+8:03.1
52	49	Teesi Tuul	Estonia	56:25.3	+8:28.2
53	51	Kseniya Shalygina	Kazakhstan	Lapped	
54	53	Aleksandra Kołodziej	Japan	Lapped	
55	57	Katya Galstyan	Armenia	Lapped	
56	60	Lara Vanda Laczko	Hungary	Lapped	
57	55	Yelizaveta Nopriienko	Ukraine	Lapped	
58	59	Sara Ponya	Hungary	Lapped	
	52	Ellen Soehol Lie	Australia	Did not finish	
	58	Ariuntungalag Enkhbayar	Mongolia	Did not start	
