= Ski jumping at the 2024 Winter Youth Olympics – Mixed team normal hill =

Mixed team normal hill at the IV Winter Youth Olympic Games
- Venue: Alpensia Ski Jumping Centre
- Dates: 21 January
- Competitors: 60 from 15 nations
- Winning points: 893.7

Medalists
1st place, gold medalist(s)		Ajda Košnjek; Urban Šimnic; Taja Bodlaj; Enej Faletič	Slovenia
2nd place, silver medalist(s)		Kjersti Græsli; Oddvar Gunnerød; Ingvild Synnøve Midtskogen; Mats Strandbråten	Norway
3rd place, bronze medalist(s)		Sara Pokorny; Niki Humml; Meghann Wadsak; Lukas Haagen	Austria

The mixed team normal hill event at the 2024 Winter Youth Olympics was held on 21 January at the Alpensia Ski Jumping Centre.

== Results ==
Rank	Bib	Country	Round 1			Final round			Total
Rank	Bib	Country	Distance (m)	Points	Rank	Distance (m)	Points	Rank	Points
1st place, gold medalist(s)	15; 15–1; 15–2; 15–3; 15–4	Slovenia; Ajda Košnjek; Urban Šimnic; Taja Bodlaj; Enej Faletič	103.0; 101.5; 100.5; 102.0	437.0; 107.3; 108.4; 107.4; 113.9	1	98.5; 106.0; 106.5; 100.0	456.7; 108.5; 122.0; 114.9; 111.3	1	893.7; 215.8; 230.4; 222.3; 225.2
2nd place, silver medalist(s)	14; 14–1; 14–2; 14–3; 14–4	Norway; Kjersti Græsli; Oddvar Gunnerød; Ingvild Synnøve Midtskogen; Mats Strandbråten	106.5; 97.0; 102.0; 90.0	398.1; 109.4; 96.3; 108.9; 83.5	2	95.0; 97.0; 107.5; 92.5	490.2; 101.2; 100.4; 124.7; 93.9	2	818.3; 210.6; 196.7; 233.6; 177.4
3rd place, bronze medalist(s)	13; 13–1; 13–2; 13–3; 13–4	Austria; Sara Pokorny; Niki Humml; Meghann Wadsak; Lukas Haagen	90.5; 105.0; 89.5; 98.0	383.8; 82.9; 115.0; 79.3; 106.6	3	85.5; 107.5; 88.0; 98.5	391.2; 77.7; 123.4; 80.4; 109.7	3	775.0; 160.6; 238.4; 159.7; 216.3
4	12; 12–1; 12–2; 12–3; 12–4	Germany; Anna-Fay Scharfenberg; Max Unglaube; Kim Amy Duschek; Alex Reiter	96.5; 107.0; 76.0; 98.0	368.9; 100.4; 114.0; 51.4; 103.1	4	92.0; 98.5; 78.0; 98.5	364.7; 92.6; 103.1; 59.0; 110.0	4	733.6; 193.0; 217.1; 110.4; 213.1
5	11; 11–1; 11–2; 11–3; 11–4	Poland; Sara Tajner; Kacper Tomasiak; Pola Bełtowska; Łukasz Łukaszczyk	77.5; 107.0; 84.5; 101.5	351.6; 53.4; 118.3; 69.0; 110.9	6	70.5; 107.0; 84.5; 102.0	361.7; 46.2; 122.4; 74.3; 118.8	5	713.3; 99.6; 240.7; 143.3; 229.7
6	7; 7–1; 7–2; 7–3; 7–4	Italy; Camilla Comazzi; Martino Zambenedetti; Noelia Vuerich; Maximilian Gartner	94.5; 99.5; 81.5; 88.5	335.6; 84.9; 100.9; 64.9; 84.9	7	84.0; 87.5; 92.0; 96.0	354.3; 78.5; 88.3; 84.7; 102.8	6	689.9; 163.4; 189.2; 149.6; 187.7
7	10; 10–1; 10–2; 10–3; 10–4	United States; Estella Hassrick; Sawyer Graves; Josie Johnson; Jason Colby	83.5; 91.0; 103.0; 93.0	352.8; 67.1; 83.3; 106.4; 96.0	5	77.0; 89.0; 93.5; 91.0	330.4; 64.2; 77.9; 95.5; 92.8	7	683.2; 131.3; 161.2; 201.9; 188.8
8	9; 9–1; 9–2; 9–3; 9–4	Czech Republic; Natalie Nejedlová; Josef Buchar; Anežka Indráčková; Daniel Škarka	66.0; 96.0; 98.0; 90.0	310.5; 28.1; 97.9; 96.0; 88.5	8	60.0; 93.0; 96.5; 95.0	319.3; 23.8; 93.9; 103.3; 98.3	8	629.8; 51.9; 191.8; 199.3; 186.8
9	8; 8–1; 8–2; 8–3; 8–4	Japan; Hana Sakurai; Takuma Mikami; Yuzuki Sato; Seigo Sasaki	82.5; 84.5; 97.5; 82.0	304.8; 62.3; 70.1; 100.3; 72.1	9	81.0; 79.0; 97.0; 84.0	307.0; 68.9; 63.7; 99.5; 74.9	9	611.8; 131.2; 133.8; 199.8; 147.0
10	5; 5–1; 5–2; 5–3; 5–4	Finland; Sofia Mattila; Juho Ojala; Emilia Vidgren; Eeli Keränen	90.5; 88.5; 75.0; 84.5	291.9; 83.9; 81.7; 51.6; 74.7	11	86.0; 80.5; 74.0; 87.0	291.6; 80.7; 72.4; 55.1; 83.4	10	583.5; 164.6; 154.1; 106.7; 158.1
11	6; 6–1; 6–2; 6–3; 6–4	France; Mathilde Bacconnier; Mathéo Vernier; Lilou Zepchi; Sébastien Woodbridge	80.5; 89.5; 92.0; 86.0	293.1; 55.2; 77.0; 84.3; 76.6	10	73.0; 81.5; 91.5; 87.0	285.2; 51.0; 71.3; 83.3; 79.6	11	578.3; 106.2; 148.3; 167.6; 156.2
12	4; 4–1; 4–2; 4–3; 4–4	China; Tang Jiahong; Ren Haoran; Weng Yangning; Zheng Pengbo	70.0; 88.0; 90.5; 85.5	263.3; 36.5; 72.8; 78.3; 75.7	12	64.5; 80.0; 93.5; 91.0	279.9; 37.3; 66.1; 92.2; 84.3	12	543.2; 73.8; 138.9; 170.5; 160.0
13	3; 3–1; 3–2; 3–3; 3–4	Kazakhstan; Sofya Shishkina; Ilya Shilnikov; Alyona Sviridenko; Ilya Mizernykh	69.5; 88.0; 65.5; 101.0	249.1; 34.8; 74.9; 31.0; 108.4	13	65.5; 80.0; 64.0; 99.5	242.2; 36.6; 68.3; 29.6; 107.7	13	491.3; 71.4; 143.2; 60.6; 216.1
14	2; 2–1; 2–2; 2–3; 2–4	Ukraine; Zhanna Hlukhova; Mykola Smyk; Daryna Ilchuk; Vasyl Bukhonko	75.0; 91.5; 63.0; 75.0	212.5; 42.2; 88.8; 26.4; 49.1	14	68.5; 85.0; 61.5; 81.0	200.5; 34.8; 79.3; 20.1; 66.3	14	413.0; 83.0; 168.1; 46.5; 115.4
15	1; 1–1; 1–2; 1–3; 1–4	Romania; Andra Maria Gheorghe; Cosmin Florin Donciu; Szerena Maria Stanciu; Radu Borca	60.5; 79.5; 47.0; 64.0	106.5; 15.0; 60.7; 0.0; 30.8	15	55.0; 81.5; 44.5; 67.5	115.6; 9.5; 67.3; 0.0; 38.8	15	222.1; 24.5; 128.0; 0.0; 69.6
