= 2025 Nordic Junior World Ski Championships =

Skiing event in Italy and the USA

2025 FIS Nordic Junior World Ski Championships
- Location: Lake Placid, United States (ski jumping and Nordic combined); Schilpario, Italy (cross-country)
- Date: 3–15 February 2025

The 2025 FIS Nordic Junior World Ski Championships were held from 3 to 15 February 2025 in Lake Placid, United States and Schilpario, Italy.

== Schedule ==
All times are local: (UTC+1 for cross-country, UTC−5 for ski jumping and Nordic combined)

Cross-country

Date	Time	Event
3 February	10:00	Men's junior sprint classical Women's junior sprint classical
4 February	10:00	Men's U23 sprint classical Women's U23 sprint classical
5 February	10:00	Women's junior 20 km mass start classical
5 February	12:00	Men's junior 20 km mass start classical
6 February	10:00	Women's U23 20 km mass start classical
6 February	12:00	Men's U23 20 km mass start classical
7 February	10:00	Men's junior 10 km freestyle
7 February	12:30	Women's junior 10 km freestyle
8 February	10:00	Men's U23 10 km freestyle
8 February	12:30	Women's U23 10 km freestyle
9 February	10:00	Mixed junior 4 x 5 km relay
9 February	12:00	Mixed U23 4 x 5 km relay

Nordic combined

Date	Time	Event
13 February	10:00; 17:00	Women's team sprint HS100 / 2 x 4.5 km
13 February	14:00; 16:30	Men's team sprint HS100 / 2 x 7.5 km
15 February	08:30; 13:00	Women's HS 100 / 5 km
15 February	09:10; 13:45	Men's HS100 / 10 km
15 February	10:30; 16:30	Mixed team HS 100 / 5+2.5+2.5+5 km

Ski jumping

Date	Time	Event
12 February	14:00	Women's HS100
12 February	18:00	Men's HS100
14 February	17:00	Men's team HS100
14 February	19:00	Women's team HS100
15 February	11:30	Mixed team HS100

== Medal summary ==
=== Junior events ===
==== Cross-country skiing ====
Event	Gold		Silver		Bronze	
Men's Junior Events
Sprint classical	Filip Skari; Norway	2:38.39	Lars Heggen; Norway	2:38.50	Isai Näff; Switzerland	2:43.55
10 kilometre freestyle	Lars Heggen; Norway	23:16.8	Davide Negroni; Italy	23:43.5	Jakob Elias Moch; Germany	23:55.5
20 kilometre mass start classical	Lars Heggen; Norway	51:12.1	Gabriele Matli; Italy	51:21.2	Leopold Strand; Norway	51:21.5
Women's Junior Events
Sprint classical	Malin Hoelsveen; Norway	3:00.53	Iselin Bjervig Drivenes; Norway	3:01.73	Milla Grosberghaugen Andreassen; Norway	3:02.12
10 kilometre freestyle	Milla Grosberghaugen Andreassen; Norway	27:31.1	Anna Endreß; Germany	28:00.4	Alison Mackie; Canada	28:07.3
20 kilometre mass start classical	Milla Grosberghaugen Andreassen; Norway	57:36.1	Hanna Engesæter Sørbye; Norway	58:04.3	Alison Mackie; Canada	58:07.4
Mixed Junior Events
4 x 5 kilometre relay	Norway Filip Skari; Hanna Engesæter Sørbye; Lars Heggen; Milla Grosberghaugen Andreassen	1:03:14.7	France Quentin Viguier; Annette Coupat; Romain Vaxelaire; Margot Tirloy	1:04:14.4	Italy Gabriele Matli; Beatrice Laurent; Davide Negroni; Marit Folie	1:04:31.3

==== Nordic combined ====
Event	Gold		Silver		Bronze	
Men's Junior Events
Individual normal hill/10 km	Paul Walcher; Austria	24:12.2	Atsushi Narita; Japan	24:18.2	Richard Stenzel; Germany	24:54.7
Team sprint normal hill/2 × 7.5 km	Austria Andreas Gfrerer; Paul Walcher	30:03.5	Norway Torje Seljeset; Even Leinan Lund	30:50.4	Japan Kyotaro Yamazaki; Atsushi Narita	30:55.1
Women's Junior Events
Individual normal hill/5 km	Ingrid Låte; Norway	14:58.6	Teja Pavec; Slovenia	15:12.9	Trine Göpfert; Germany	15:15.5
Team sprint normal hill/2 × 4.5 km	Finland Heta Hirvonen; Minja Korhonen	20:52.2	Slovenia Maša Likozar Brankovič; Tia Malovrh	21:49.7	Germany Trine Göpfert; Ronja Loh	22:05.1
Mixed Junior Events
Team normal hill/5+2.5+2.5+5 km	Germany Jonathan Gräbert; Ronja Loh; Trine Göpfert; Richard Stenzel	42:27.3	Austria Andreas Gfrerer; Katharina Gruber; Anna-Sophia Gredler; Paul Walcher	42:52.9	Japan Atsushi Narita; Hazuki Ikeda; Yuzuka Fujiwara; Kaisei Mori	43:05.6

==== Ski jumping ====
Event	Gold		Silver		Bronze	
Men's Junior Events
Individual normal hill	Stephan Embacher; Austria	258.1	Tate Frantz; United States	257.7	Simon Steinberger; Austria	255.3
Team normal hill	Austria Simon Steinberger; Lukas Haagen; Nikolaus Humml; Stephan Embacher	932.5	Slovenia Urban Šimnic; Smerajc Nik Bergant; Enej Faletič; Žiga Jančar	910.1	United States Jason Colby; Henry Loher; Bryce Kloc; Tate Frantz	887.5
Women's Junior Events
Individual normal hill	Ingvild Synnøve Midtskogen; Norway	241.8	Ingrid Låte; Norway	209.8	Taja Bodlaj; Slovenia	200.2
Team normal hill	Germany Lia Böhme; Anna-Fay Scharfenberg; Julina Kreibich; Kim Amy Duschek	834.3	Slovenia Lucija Jurgec; Tinkara Komar; Tina Erzar; Taja Bodlaj	832.3	Japan Kikka Sakamoto; Riko Iwasaki; Yu Saito; Yuzuki Sato	829.7
Mixed Junior Events
Team normal hill	Slovenia Taja Bodlaj; Žiga Jančar; Tina Erzar; Urban Šimnic	919.8	United States Sandra Sproch; Jason Colby; Josie Johnson; Tate Frantz	861.6	Austria Sara Pokorny; Stephan Embacher; Meghann Wadsak; Simon Steinberger	834.7

=== U23 events ===
==== Cross-country skiing ====
Event	Gold		Silver		Bronze	
Men's U23 Events
Sprint classical	Anton Grahn; Sweden	2:37.79	Måns Skoglund; Sweden	2:38.44	Jørgen Schjølberg; Norway	3:48.46
10 kilometre freestyle	Mathias Holbæk; Norway	26:40.9	Thomas Linnebo Mollestad; Norway	27:06.0	Martino Carollo; Italy	27:23.4
20 kilometre mass start classical	Mathias Holbæk; Norway	50:15.2	Niko Anttola; Finland	50:19.7	Thomas Linnebo Mollestad; Norway	50:20.0
Women's U23 Events
Sprint classical	Märta Rosenberg; Sweden	2:59.10	Gina del Rio; Andorra	3:04.24	Elin Henriksson; Sweden	3:05.05
10 kilometre freestyle	Helen Hoffmann; Germany	32:36.4	Rosie Fordham; Australia	33:02.1	Liliane Gagnon; Canada	33:13.7
20 kilometre mass start classical	Märta Rosenberg; Sweden	55:56.8	Eva Ingebrigtsen; Norway	56:00.4	Liliane Gagnon; Canada	56:05.3
Mixed U23 Events
4 x 5 kilometre relay	Norway Thomas Linnebo Mollestad; Anniken Sand; Mathias Holbæk; Eva Ingebrigtsen	59:17.5	Italy Davide Ghio; Nadine Laurent; Martino Carollo; Maria Gismondi	59:54.4	Germany Elias Keck; Verena Veit; Marius Kastner; Helen Hoffmann	1:00:09.3

=== Medal tables ===
==== All events ====
* Host nation (Italy) and (United States)

Rank	Nation	Gold	Silver	Bronze	Total
1	Norway	12	7	4	23
2	Austria	4	1	2	7
3	Germany	3	1	5	9
4	Sweden	3	1	1	5
5	Slovenia	1	4	1	6
6	Finland	1	1	0	2
7	Italy*	0	3	2	5
8	United States*	0	2	1	3
9	Japan	0	1	3	4
10	Andorra	0	1	0	1
10	Australia	0	1	0	1
10	France	0	1	0	1
13	Canada	0	0	4	4
14	Switzerland	0	0	1	1
Totals (14 entries)		24	24	24	72

==== Junior events ====
* Host nation (Italy) and (United States)

Rank	Nation	Gold	Silver	Bronze	Total
1	Norway	9	5	2	16
2	Austria	4	1	2	7
3	Germany	2	1	4	7
4	Slovenia	1	4	1	6
5	Finland	1	0	0	1
6	Italy*	0	2	1	3
6	United States*	0	2	1	3
8	Japan	0	1	3	4
9	France	0	1	0	1
10	Canada	0	0	2	2
11	Switzerland	0	0	1	1
Totals (11 entries)		17	17	17	51

==== U23 events ====
* Host nation (Italy)

Rank	Nation	Gold	Silver	Bronze	Total
1	Norway	3	2	2	7
2	Sweden	3	1	1	5
3	Germany	1	0	1	2
4	Italy*	0	1	1	2
5	Andorra	0	1	0	1
5	Australia	0	1	0	1
5	Finland	0	1	0	1
8	Canada	0	0	2	2
Totals (8 entries)		7	7	7	21
