= CENTOS =

CENTOS may refer to:

- CENTOS (charity), a Polish children's aid society
- CentOS, a Linux distribution
- CENTOS (Oldenburg Center for Sustainability Economics and Management), a center co-founded by Niko Paech

== See also ==
- Cento (disambiguation)
