= Cento (surname) =

Cento is an Italian surname. Notable people with this surname include:

- Anna Cento Bull, British academic specializing in post-World War II Italian history
- Fernando Cento (1883–1973), Italian cardinal of the Catholic Church
- Paolo Cento (born 1962), Italian politician

== See also ==
- Centa (disambiguation)
- Cento (disambiguation)
