= Centini =

Centini is a surname of Italian origin. Notable people with this surname include:

- Felice Centini (1562–1641), Italian Roman Catholic cardinal
- Maurizio Centini, O.F.M. Conv. (1592 – 1639), Italian Roman Catholic Bishop of Mileto (1631–1639) and then Bishop of Massa Lubrense

== See also ==
- Centi (disambiguation)
