= Kristin Austgulen Fosnæs =

Norwegian cross-country skier (born 2000)

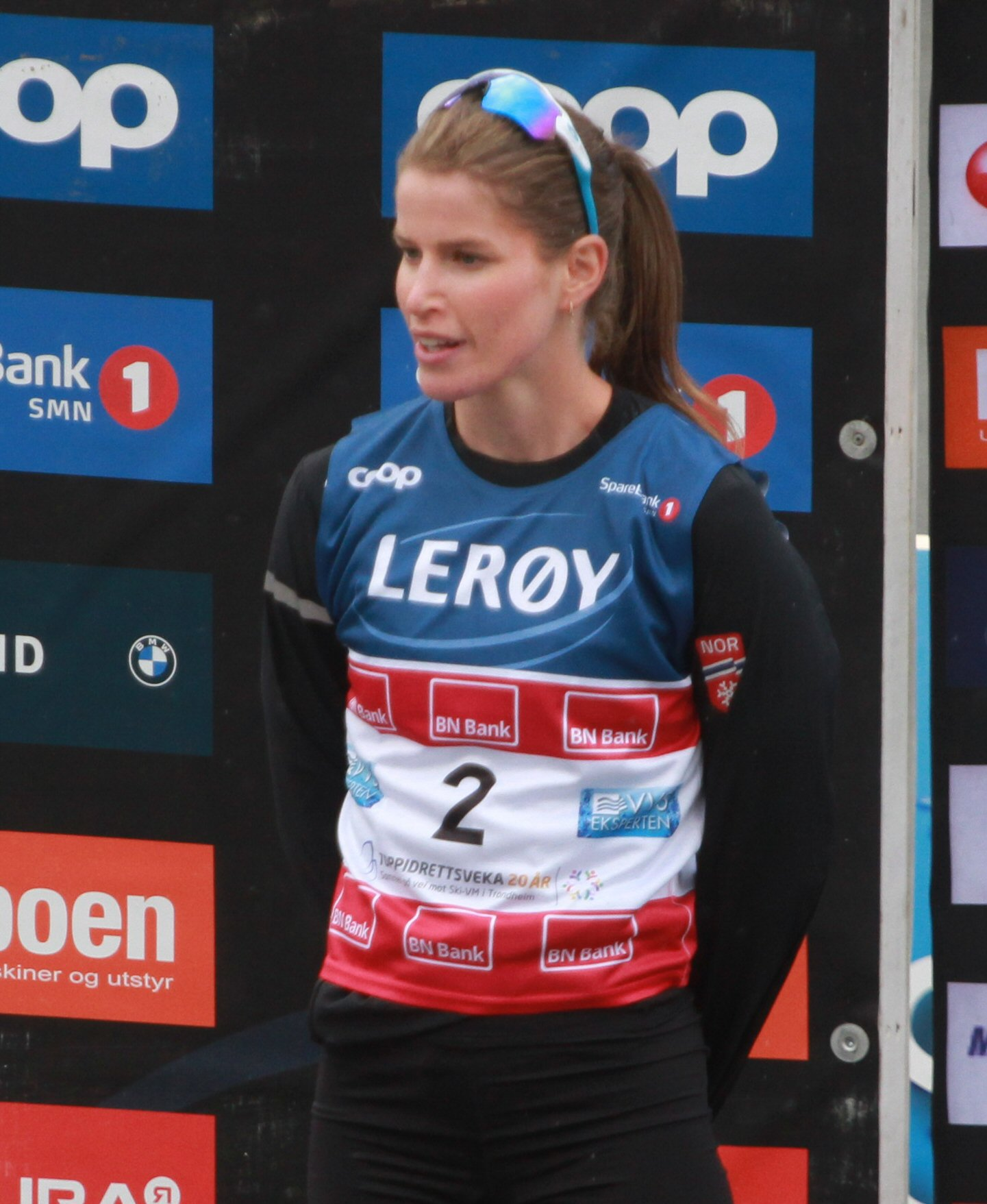

Personal information
- Nationality: Norway
- Born: 30 May 2000 (age 26)

Sport
- Sport: Skiing
- Club: Fossum IF

World Cup career
- Seasons: 6 – (2021–present)
- Indiv. starts: 67
- Indiv. podiums: 0
- Indiv. wins: 0
- Team starts: 7
- Team podiums: 3
- Team wins: 0
- Overall titles: 0 – (13th in 2025)
- Discipline titles: 0
Medal record
Women's cross-country skiing
Representing Norway
Olympic Games
Gold medal – first place	2026 Milano Cortina	4 × 7.5 km relay
World Championships
Silver medal – second place	2025 Trondheim	4 x 7.5 km relay
U23 World Championships
Gold medal – first place	2022 Lygna	4 × 5 km mixed relay
Gold medal – first place	2023 Whistler	20 km classical
Silver medal – second place	2023 Whistler	sprint classical
Junior World Championships
Gold medal – first place	2019 Lahti	4 × 3.3 km mixed relay
- Updated on 22 March 2026

Kristin Austgulen Fosnæs (born 30 May 2000) is a Norwegian cross-country skier. She debuted in World Cup during season 2020–21

== Cross-country skiing results ==
All results are sourced from the International Ski Federation (FIS).

She won gold in the teams relay and placed fourth in the 50 km classical race at the 2026 Winter Olympics.

=== Olympic Games ===
- 1 medal – (1 gold)

Year	Age	Individual	Skiathlon	Mass start	Sprint	Relay	Team sprint
2026	25	9	10	4	—	Gold	—

=== World Championships ===
- 1 medal – (1 silver)

Year	Age	Individual	Skiathlon	Mass start	Sprint	Relay	Team sprint
2025	24	—	10	—	—	Silver	—

=== World Cup ===
==== Season standings ====
Season	Age	Discipline standings				Ski Tour standings
Season	Age	Overall	Distance	Sprint	U23	Tour de Ski
2021	20	93	—	60	19	—
2022	21	NC	NC	NC	NC	—
2023	22	69	61	53	8	—
2024	23	24	20	46	—N/a	17
2025	24	13	13	54	—N/a	10
2026	25	25	8	83	—N/a	DNF
