= FIS Nordic World Ski Championships 2025 – Women's 50 kilometre freestyle =

Women's 50 kilometre freestyle at the FIS Nordic World Ski Championships 2025
- Venue: Granåsen Ski Centre
- Location: Trondheim, Norway
- Dates: 9 March
- Competitors: 35 from 16 nations
- Winning time: 2:24:55.3

Medalists
gold medal	Frida Karlsson	Sweden
silver medal	Heidi Weng	Norway
bronze medal	Therese Johaug	Norway

The Women's 50 kilometre freestyle competition at the FIS Nordic World Ski Championships 2025 was held on 9 March 2025.

== Results ==
The race was started at 11:30.

Rank	Bib	Athlete	Country	Time	Deficit
1st place, gold medalist(s)	15	Frida Karlsson	Sweden	2:24:55.3	
2nd place, silver medalist(s)	5	Heidi Weng	Norway	2:24:57.4	+2.1
3rd place, bronze medalist(s)	6	Therese Johaug	Norway	2:24:58.2	+2.9
4	3	Ebba Andersson	Sweden	2:25:14.0	+18.7
5	14	Jonna Sundling	Sweden	2:29:07.1	+4:11.8
6	8	Nora Sanness	Norway	2:31:55.6	+7:00.3
7	10	Krista Pärmäkoski	Finland	2:32:26.0	+7:30.7
8	19	Nadja Kälin	Switzerland	2:33:12.5	+8:17.2
9	11	Flora Dolci	France	2:33:14.3	+8:19.0
10	2	Astrid Øyre Slind	Norway	2:34:30.4	+9:35.1
11	4	Teresa Stadlober	Austria	2:34:47.4	+9:52.1
12	12	Kateřina Janatová	Czech Republic	2:35:04.1	+10:08.8
13	7	Pia Fink	Germany	2:36:10.0	+11:14.7
14	9	Moa Ilar	Sweden	2:36:55.4	+12:00.1
15	22	Vilma Nissinen	Finland	2:37:29.9	+12:34.6
16	21	Maria Gismondi	Italy	2:37:32.8	+12:37.5
17	16	Maja Dahlqvist	Sweden	2:39:30.0	+14:34.7
18	20	Vilma Ryytty	Finland	2:40:01.9	+15:06.6
19	17	Julia Kern	United States	2:41:05.5	+16:10.2
20	27	Rosie Fordham	Australia	2:41:45.9	+16:50.6
21	13	Sophia Laukli	United States	2:41:59.9	+17:04.6
22	1	Jessie Diggins	United States	2:42:14.3	+17:19.0
23	26	Alayna Sonnesyn	United States	2:42:38.9	+17:43.6
24	29	Nadezhda Stepashkina	Kazakhstan	2:43:49.4	+18:54.1
25	24	Sofie Krehl	Germany	2:44:37.1	+19:41.8
26	23	Katharina Brudermann	Austria	2:45:46.1	+20:50.8
27	25	Barbora Havlíčková	Czech Republic	2:50:12.3	+25:17.0
28	30	Teesi Tuul	Estonia	2:50:44.8	+25:49.5
29	33	Sophia Tsu Velicer	Chinese Taipei	2:52:40.7	+27:45.4
30	28	Olivia Bouffard-Nesbitt	Canada	2:53:24.7	+28:29.4
31	31	Angelina Shuryga	Kazakhstan	LAP	
32	32	Tuva Bygrave	Australia	LAP	
33	35	Lara Vanda Laczkó	Hungary	LAP	
34	34	Sara Ponya	Hungary	LAP	
	18	Liliane Gagnon	Canada	Did not start	
