= Milla Grosberghaugen Andreassen =

Norwegian cross-country skier (born 2005)

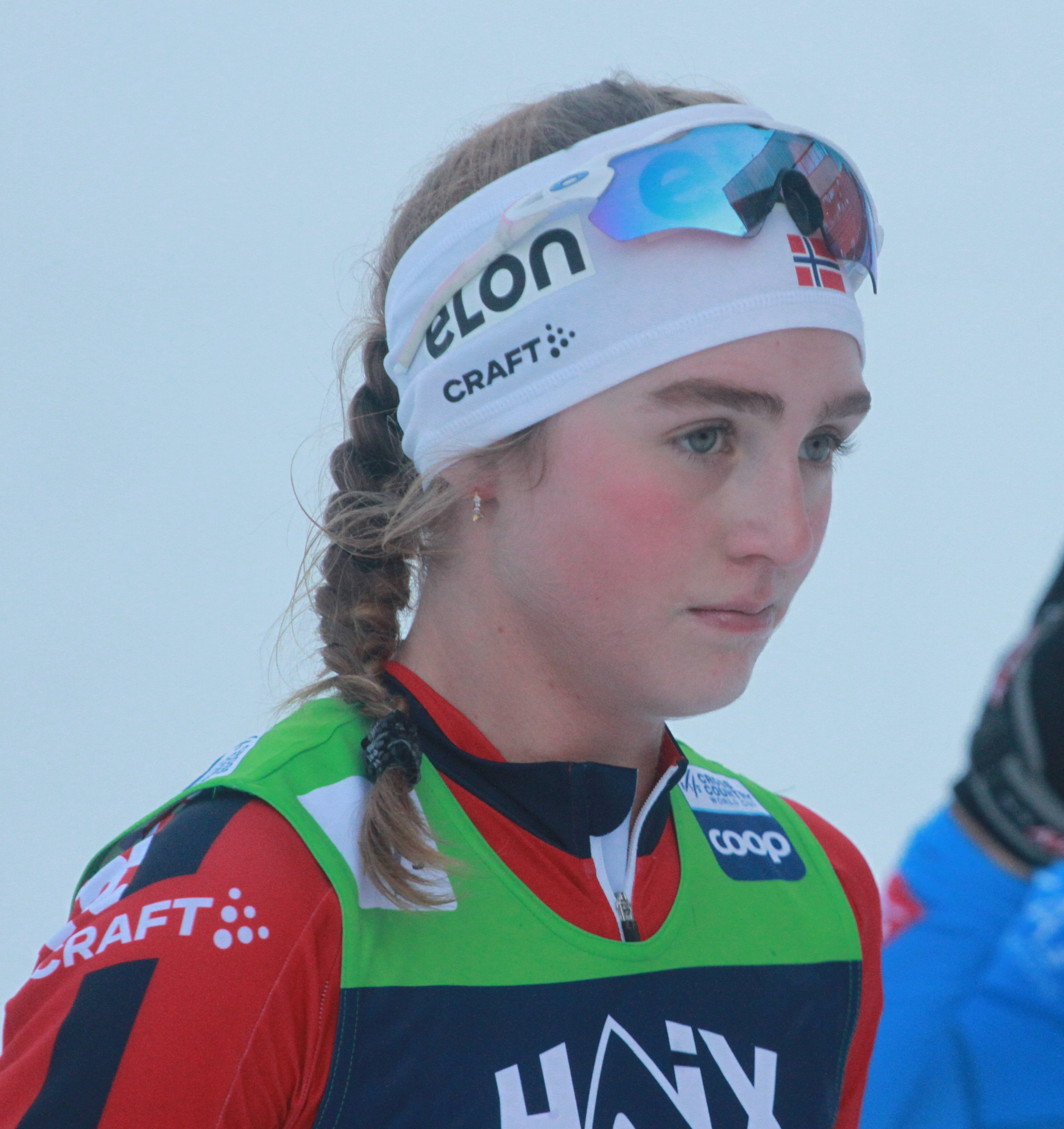
- Andreassen in 2025

Personal information
- Nationality: Norway
- Born: 4 August 2005 (age 20)

Sport
- Sport: Skiing

World Cup career
- Seasons: 2 – (2024–present)
- Indiv. podiums: 0
Medal record
Women's cross-country skiing
Representing Norway
Junior World Championships
| Gold medal – first place | 2023 Whistler | 10 km freestyle |
| Gold medal – first place | 2023 Whistler | 20 km mass start |
| Gold medal – first place | 2023 Whistler | 4 × 5 km relay |
| Gold medal – first place | 2025 Schilpario | 10 km freestyle |
| Gold medal – first place | 2025 Schilpario | 20 km mass start |
| Gold medal – first place | 2025 Schilpario | 4 × 5 km relay |
| Silver medal – second place | 2024 Planica | 4 × 5 km relay |
| Silver medal – second place | 2023 Schilpario | Sprint classical |
| Bronze medal – third place | 2024 Planica | Sprint freestyle |
| Bronze medal – third place | 2025 Schilpario | Sprint classical |
- Updated on 10 February 2026

Milla Grosberghaugen Andreassen (born 4 August 2005) is a Norwegian cross-country skier. She is a six-time Junior World Champion.

== Career ==
Andreassen competed at the 2025 Nordic Junior World Ski Championships and won gold medals in the 10 kilometre freestyle, 20 kilometre mass start, and 4 x 5 kilometre relay. She also won a bronze medal in the sprint classical.

In January 2026, she was selected to represent Norway at the 2026 Winter Olympics.
