= Sophia Laukli =

American cross-country skier (born 2000)

Personal information
- Nationality: United States
- Citizenship: Norway; United States
- Born: 8 June 2000 (age 26) Yarmouth, Maine, United States

Sport
- Sport: Skiing
- Club: University of Utah Ski Team

World Cup career
- Seasons: 4 – (2021–present)
- Indiv. starts: 39
- Indiv. podiums: 2
- Indiv. wins: 1
- Team starts: 4
- Team podiums: 1
- Overall titles: 0 – (53rd in 2022)
- Discipline titles: 0
Medal record
Women's cross-country skiing
Representing United States
Junior World Championships
Silver medal – second place	2020 Oberwiesenthal	4 × 3.33 km relay
- Updated on 7 January 2024

Sophia Laukli (born 8 June 2000) is an American cross-country skier and trailrunner from Yarmouth, Maine. Her highest World Cup finish was first in the freestyle 10 km event at Val di Fiemme on January 7, 2024. She previously skied for the Middlebury College ski team, where she earned All-American honors placing second in the 5k freestyle, and now races for the University of Utah ski team. She was named in the United States Ski Team for the 2022 Winter Olympics in Beijing.

In 2023 she won the Marathon du Mont Blanc and Sierre-Zinal.

Laukli has dual citizenship through her Norwegian father and speaks fluent Norwegian.

== Cross-country skiing results ==
All results are sourced from the International Ski Federation (FIS).

=== Olympic Games ===
Year	Age	Individual	Skiathlon	Mass start	Sprint	Relay	Team sprint
2022	21	—	—	15	—	—	—

=== World Championships ===
Year	Age	Individual	Skiathlon	Mass start	Sprint	Relay	Team sprint
2021	20	23	25	28	—	—	—
2023	22	25	29	—	—	—	—
2025	24		23	21		6	

=== World Cup ===
==== Season standings ====
Season	Age	Discipline standings				Ski Tour standings	
Season	Age	Overall	Distance	Sprint	U23	Nordic Opening	Tour de Ski
2021	20	97	63	—	22	—	—
2022	21	53	34	NC	9	—N/a	23
2023	22	58	47	NC	5	—N/a	23
2024	23	22	15	NC	—N/a	—N/a	14
2025	24	29	18	NC	—N/a	—N/a	21

==== Individual podiums ====
- 1 victory – (1 SWC)
- 2 podiums – (2 SWC)

No.	Season	Date	Location	Race	Level	Place
1	2022–23	8 January 2023	Val di Fiemme, Italy	10 km Mass Start F	Stage World Cup	3rd
2	2023–24	7 January 2024	Val di Fiemme, Italy	10 km Mass Start F	Stage World Cup	1st

==== Team podiums ====
- 1 podium – (1 RL)

No.	Season	Date	Location	Race	Level	Place	Teammate(s)
1	2023–24	3 December 2023	Gällivare, Sweden	4 × 7.5 km Relay C/F	World Cup	3rd	Diggins / Brennan / Kern
