= Centi (disambiguation) =

Centi may refer to:

- Centi-, a unit prefix in the metric system denoting a factor of one hundredth
- Giancarlo Centi (born 1959), Italian professional football coach and a former player
- Luis Fernando Centi (born 1976), Italian footballer
- Super Space Blaster Centi-Asteroid Invaderpedes 2, an American steampunk musical comedy project formed in San Diego in 2008

== See also ==
- Cento (disambiguation)
