= 2026–27 FIS Ski Jumping World Cup =

International ski jumping competition

Discipline	Men	Women
Overall	(Austria) Stephan Embacher (Norway) K. Eriksen Sundal	(Norway) Eirin Maria Kvandal
Nations Cup	Austria	Norway

Stage events

Competition
Edition	48th	16th
Locations	17	20
Individual	27	32
Team	4	–
Mixed	4	4

The 2026–27 FIS Ski Jumping World Cup, organized by the International Ski Federation (FIS) is the 48th World Cup season for men, the 30th season in ski flying, and the 16th season for women as the highest level of international ski jumping competitions.

In this season FIS signed the new four years long contract (including the 2029/30 season), with the new main sponsor, Kaufland, a German hypermarket business company; succeeding fellow German company and longterm main sponsor (since 2008/09) Viessmann.

First ever women's Four Hills Tournament will be held this season on the same four traditional venues as men's edition. Peak of the season will be the 45th FIS Nordic World Ski Championships, held in Falun, Sweden, from 28 February to 6 March 2027.

== New this season ==
- some competitions (Titisee-Neustadt, Willingen, Oslo etc.) will have only one qualifications for both weekend events
- atletes are competing by qualification results order (not by WC points order, unless time runs out)
- bib numbers order is now reversed from No.50 or No.40 (the worst) to No.1 (the best)
- shorter programm on some venues (no trial rounds and second qualifications)
- U23 jersey for young competitors is first time awarded (green square shirt)
- on Sunday events they will now jump by Saturday competition order
- there won't be qualifications on all the competitions this season

== Map of World Cup hosts ==
The following list contains all 23 World Cup hosts of the season.

Lillehammer	Falun	Ruka	Wisła	Titisee-Neustadt	Engelberg
Lysgårdsbakken	Lugnet	Rukatunturi	Malinka	Hochfirstschanze	Gross-Titlis
Oberstdorf	Garmisch-Pa	Innsbruck	Bischofshofen	Zakopane	Sapporo
Schattenbergschanze	Große Olympiaschanze	Bergiselschanze	Paul-Ausserleitner	Wielka Krokiew	Ōkurayama
Willingen	Bad Mitterndorf	Lahti	Oslo	Vikersund	Planica
Mühlenkopfschanze	Kulm	Salpausselkä	Holmenkollbakken	Vikersundbakken	Letalnica bratov Gorišek
Villach	Ljubno ob Savinji	Zhangjiakou	Zaō	Hinzenbach	Falun
					2027 World Championships (25 February–6 March 2027)
Villacher Alpenarena	Savina Center	Snow Ruyi	Yamagata	Aigner-Schanze	Men & Women
Europe
Germany		Austria United States		Asia	

== Men's Individual ==
Individual events in the World Cup history

Total	F	L	N	Winners
1179	157	859	163	178

after large hill event in Lillehammer (22 November 2026)

=== Calendar ===
Event key: L – large hill / F – flying hill
All	No.	Date	Place (Hill)	Size	Winner	Second	Third	Overall Leader	R.
1178	1	21 November 2026	(Norway) Lillehammer (Lysgardsbakken HS140)	L _{858}	(Austria) Stephan Embacher	(Norway) Halvor Egner Granerud	(Austria) Raffael Zimmermann	(Austria) Stephan Embacher	
1179	2	22 November 2026	(Norway) Lillehammer (Lysgardsbakken HS140)	L _{859}	(Norway) Kristoffer Eriksen Sundal	(Austria) Raffael Zimmermann	(Norway) Isak Andreas Langmo	(Austria) Stephan Embacher (Norway) Kristoffer Eriksen Sundal	
1180	3	28 November 2026	(Finland) Ruka (Rukatunturi HS142)	L _{860}					
1181	4	29 November 2026	(Finland) Ruka (Rukatunturi HS142)	L _{861}					
1182	5	5 December 2026	(Poland) Wisła (Malinka HS134)	L _{862}					
1183	6	6 December 2026	(Poland) Wisła (Malinka HS134)	L _{863}					
1184	7	12 December 2026	(Germany) Titisee-Neustadt (Hochfirstschanze HS142)	L _{864}					
1185	8	13 December 2026	(Germany) Titisee-Neustadt (Hochfirstschanze HS142)	L _{865}					
1186	9	19 December 2026	(Switzerland) Engelberg (Gross-Titlis HS140)	L _{866}					
1187	10	20 December 2026	(Switzerland) Engelberg (Gross-Titlis HS140)	L _{867}					
1188	11	29 December 2026	(Germany) Oberstdorf (Schattenberg HS137)	L _{868}					
1189	12	1 January 2027	(Germany) Garmisch-Pa (Olympiaschanze HS142)	L _{869}					
1190	13	3 January 2027	(Austria) Innsbruck (Bergiselschanze HS128)	L _{870}					
1191	14	6 January 2027	(Austria) Bischofshofen (Paul-Ausserleitner HS142)	L _{871}					
75th Men's Four Hills Tournament Overall (29 December 2026 – 6 January 2027)								Four Hills Tournament	
1192	15	17 January 2027	(Poland) Zakopane (Wielka Krokiew HS140)	L _{872}					
1193	16	23 January 2027	(Japan) Sapporo (Okurayama HS137)	L _{873}					
1194	17	24 January 2027	(Japan) Sapporo (Okurayama HS137)	L _{874}					
1195	18	30 January 2027	(Germany) Willingen (Mühlenkopf HS147)	L _{875}					
1196	19	31 January 2027	(Germany) Willingen (Mühlenkopf HS147)	L _{876}					
1197	20	6 February 2027	(United States) Lake Placid (MacKenzie Int. HS128)	L _{877}					
1198	21	14 February 2027	(Finland) Lahti (Salpausselkä HS130)	L _{878}					
1199	22	20 February 2027	(Norway) Vikersund (Vikersundbakken HS240)	F _{158}					
1200	23	21 February 2027	(Norway) Vikersund (Vikersundbakken HS240)	F _{159}					
FIS Nordic World Ski Championships 2027 (28 February – 6 March • (Sweden) Falun)
1201	24	13 March 2027	(Norway) Oslo (Holmenkollen HS134)	L _{879}					
1202	25	14 March 2027	(Norway) Oslo (Holmenkollen HS134)	L _{880}					
qualifying		18 March 2027	(Slovenia) Planica (Letalnica b. Gorišek HS240)	F _{Qro}				—	
1203	26	19 March 2027	(Slovenia) Planica (Letalnica b. Gorišek HS240)	F _{160}					
team		20 March 2027	(Slovenia) Planica (Letalnica b. Gorišek HS240)	F _{T}			'	—	
1204	27	21 March 2027	(Slovenia) Planica (Letalnica b. Gorišek HS240)	F _{161}					
9th Planica7 Overall (18 – 21 March 2027)								Planica7	
48th FIS World Cup Men's Overall (21 November 2026 – 21 March 2027)								World Cup Overall	

=== Overall ===
Rank	after 2 of 27 events	Points
1	(Austria) Stephan Embacher	145
	(Norway) K. Eriksen Sundal	145
3	(Austria) Raffael Zimmermann	140
4	(Norway) Halvor Egner Granerud	130
5	(Norway) Isak Andreas Langmo	89
6	(Austria) Jan Hörl	80
7	(Austria) Daniel Tschofenig	74
8	(Japan) Ryōyū Kobayashi	52
9	(Austria) Maximilian Ortner	51
10	(Slovenia) Anže Lanišek	50

=== Nations Cup ===
Rank	after 3 of 35 events	Points
1	Austria	668
2	Norway	620
3	Japan	287
4	Slovenia	237
5	Germany	140
6	Switzerland	108
7	Finland	98
8	Poland	54
9	France	29
10	United States	27

=== Prize money ===
Rank	after 3 of 35 events	EUR (€)
1	(Norway) K. Eriksen Sundal	29,500
2	(Austria) Stephan Embacher	24,175
3	(Austria) Raffael Zimmermann	24,000
4	(Norway) Halvor Egner Granerud	18,500
5	(Norway) Isak Andreas Langmo	15,775
6	(Norway) Marius Lindvik	14,700
7	(Austria) Jan Hörl	13,500
8	(Japan) Ryōyū Kobayashi	12,600
9	(Japan) Ren Nikaidō	10,000
10	(Austria) Maximilian Ortner	7,650

=== Ski flying ===
Rank	after 0 of 4 events	Points
1
2
3
4
5
6
7
8
9
10

=== Four Hills Tournament ===
Rank	after 0 of 4 events	Points
1
2
3
4
5
6
7
8
9
10

=== Planica7 ===
Rank	after 0 of 4 events	Points
1
2
3
4
5
6
7
8
9
10

== Women's Individual ==
Individual events in the World Cup history

Total	F	L	N	Winners
292	5	104	183	31

after large hill event in Lillehammer (22 November 2026)

=== Calendar ===
Event key: L – large hill / F – flying hill
All	No.	Date	Place (Hill)	Size	Winner	Second	Third	Overall Leader	R.
291	1	21 November 2026	(Norway) Lillehammer (Lysgardsbakken HS140)	L _{103}	(Norway) Eirin Maria Kvandal	(Norway) Ingvild Midtskogen	(Norway) Gyda Westvold Hansen	(Norway) Eirin Maria Kvandal	
292	2	22 November 2026	(Norway) Lillehammer (Lysgardsbakken HS140)	L _{104}	(Norway) Anna Odine Strøm	(Norway) Eirin Maria Kvandal	(Norway) Gyda Westvold Hansen	(Norway) Eirin Maria Kvandal	
293	3	28 November 2026	(Austria) Hinzenbach (Aigner-Schanze HS90)	N _{184}					
294	4	29 November 2026	(Austria) Hinzenbach (Aigner-Schanze HS90)	N _{185}					
295	5	5 December 2026	(Poland) Wisła (Malinka HS134)	L _{105}					
296	6	6 December 2026	(Poland) Wisła (Malinka HS134)	L _{106}					
297	7	12 December 2026	(Germany) Titisee-Neustadt (Hochfirstschanze HS142)	L _{107}					
298	8	13 December 2026	(Germany) Titisee-Neustadt (Hochfirstschanze HS142)	L _{108}					
299	9	19 December 2026	(Switzerland) Engelberg (Gross-Titlis HS140)	L _{109}					
300	10	20 December 2026	(Switzerland) Engelberg (Gross-Titlis HS140)	L _{110}					
301	11	28 December 2026	(Germany) Oberstdorf (Schattenberg HS137)	L _{111}					
302	12	31 December 2026	(Germany) Garmisch-Pa (Olympiaschanze HS142)	L _{112}					
303	13	2 January 2027	(Austria) Innsbruck (Bergiselschanze HS128)	L _{113}					
304	14	5 January 2027	(Austria) Bischofshofen (Paul-Ausserleitner HS142)	L _{114}					
1st Women's Four Hills Tournament Overall (28 December 2026 – 5 January 2027)								Four Hills Tournament	
305	15	9 January 2027	(Slovenia) Ljubno (Savina HS94)	N _{186}					
306	16	10 January 2027	(Slovenia) Ljubno (Savina HS94)	N _{187}					
307	17	15 January 2027	(China) Zhangjiakou (Snow Ruyi HS140)	L _{115}					
308	18	16 January 2027	(China) Zhangjiakou (Snow Ruyi HS140)	L _{116}					
309	19	19 January 2027	(Japan) Zaō (Yamagata HS102)	N _{188}					
310	20	20 January 2027	(Japan) Zaō (Yamagata HS102)	N _{189}					
311	21	23 January 2027	(Japan) Sapporo (Okurayama HS137)	L _{117}					
312	22	30 January 2027	(Germany) Willingen (Mühlenkopf HS147)	L _{118}					
313	23	31 January 2027	(Germany) Willingen (Mühlenkopf HS147)	L _{119}					
314	24	6 February 2027	(United States) Lake Placid (MacKenzie Int. HS128)	L _{120}					
315	25	11 February 2027	(Finland) Lahti (Salpausselkä HS130)	L _{121}					
316	26	12 February 2027	(Finland) Lahti (Salpausselkä HS130)	L _{122}					
317	27	18 February 2027	(Norway) Vikersund (Vikersundbakken HS240)	F _{006}					
318	28	20 February 2027	(Austria) Villach (Alpenarena HS98)	N _{190}					
319	29	21 February 2027	(Austria) Villach (Alpenarena HS98)	N _{191}					
FIS Nordic World Ski Championships 2027 (25 February – 5 March • (Sweden) Falun)
320	30	13 March 2027	(Norway) Oslo (Holmenkollen HS134)	L _{123}					
321	31	14 March 2027	(Norway) Oslo (Holmenkollen HS134)	L _{124}					
322	32	20 March 2027	(Slovenia) Planica (Letalnica b. Gorišek HS240)	F _{007}					
16th FIS World Cup Men's Overall (21 November 2026 – 20 March 2027)								World Cup Overall	

=== Overall ===
Rank	after 2 of 32 events	Points
1	(Norway) Eirin Maria Kvandal	180
2	(Norway) Anna Odine Strøm	150
3	(Norway) Ingvild Midtskogen	120
	(Norway) Gyda Westvold Hansen	120
5	(Japan) Nozomi Maruyama	79
6	(Slovenia) Nika Vodan	72
7	(Norway) Heidi Dyhre Traaserud	63
8	(Austria) Hannah Wiegele	62
9	(Germany) Selina Freitag	52
10	(Sweden) Frida Westman	45

=== Nations Cup ===
Rank	after 3 of 36 events	Points
1	Norway	845
2	Japan	355
3	Slovenia	275
4	Austria	258
5	Germany	220
6	Finland	111
7	Poland	76
8	Sweden	45
9	Canada	41
10	China	37

=== Prize money ===
Rank	after 3 of 36 events	EUR (€)
1	(Norway) Eirin Maria Kvandal	17,500
2	(Norway) Gyda Westvold Hansen	14,500
3	(Japan) Nozomi Maruyama	10,000
4	(Japan) Yūki Itō	8,200
5	(Norway) Anna Odine Strøm	7,600
6	(Norway) Ingvild Midtskogen	6,000
7	(Slovenia) Nika Vodan	5,900
8	(Austria) Lisa Fettner	5,100
9	(Slovenia) Nika Prevc	4,300
10	(Austria) Julia Mühlbacher	4,100

=== Ski flying ===
Rank	after 0 of 2 events	Points
1
2
3
4
5
6
7
8
9
10

=== Four Hills Tournament ===
Rank	after 0 of 4 events	Points
1
2
3
4
5
6
7
8
9
10

== Team events ==
Team events in the World Cup history

Total	F	L	N	Winners	Competition
13	—	10	3	5	Mixed team
124	28	94	2	7	Men's team

after mixed team L event in Lillehammer (20 November 2026)

=== Calendar ===
Event key: F – flying hill, L – large hill
All	No.	Date	Place (Hill)	Size	Winner	Second	Third	R.
Mixed team
13	1	20 November 2026	(Norway) Lillehammer (Lysgårdsbakken HS140)	L _{010}	Norway: 1. Gyda Westvold Hansen; 2. K. Eriksen Sundal; 3. Eirin Maria Kvandal; 4. Marius Lindvik	Japan: 1. Yūki Itō; 2. Ryōyū Kobayashi; 3. Nozomi Maruyama; 4. Ren Nikaidō	Austria: 1. Lisa Fettner; 2. Raffael Zimmermann; 3. Julia Mühlbacher; 4. Jan Hörl	
14	2	22 January 2027	(Japan) Sapporo (Okurayama HS137)	L _{011}				
15	3	29 January 2027	(Germany) Willingen (Mühlenkopf HS147)	L _{012}				
16	4	7 February 2027	(United States) Lake Placid (MacKenzie Int. HS128)	L _{013}				
FIS Nordic World Ski Championships 2027 (27 February • (Sweden) Falun)
Men's team
126	1	11 December 2026	(Germany) Titisee-Neustadt (Hochfirstschanze HS142)	L _{095}				
127	2	16 January 2027	(Poland) Zakopane (Wielka Krokiew HS140)	L _{096}				
128	3	13 March 2027	(Finland) Lahti (Salpausselkä HS130)	L _{097}				
129	4	20 March 2027	(Slovenia) Planica (Letalnica b. Gorišek HS240)	F _{030}				

== Point distribution ==
The table shows the number of points won in the 2026–27 FIS Ski Jumping World Cup for men and women.

Place	1	2	3	4	5	6	7	8	9	10	11	12	13	14	15	16	17	18	19	20	21	22	23	24	25	26	27	28	29	30
Individual	100	80	60	50	45	40	36	32	29	26	24	22	20	18	16	15	14	13	12	11	10	9	8	7	6	5	4	3	2	1
M + W + Mixed Team	400	350	300	250	200	150	100	50	points not awarded
Super Team	200	160	120	100	80	70	60	50	40	30	20	10	points not awarded

== Qualifications ==
=== Men ===
No.	Place	Qualifications	Competition	Size	Winner	R.
1	(Norway) Lillehammer	20 November 2026	21 November 2026	L	(Norway) Isak Andreas Langmo	
2	(Norway) Lillehammer	22 November 2026		L	(Austria) Stephan Embacher	

=== Women ===
No.	Place	Qualifications	Competition	Size	Winner	R.
1	(Norway) Lillehammer	20 November 2026	21 November 2026	L	(Norway) Ingvild Midtskogen	
2	(Norway) Lillehammer	22 November 2026		L	(Norway) Ingvild Midtskogen	

== Prize money distribution ==
=== Men's Individual ===
1st	2nd	3rd	4th	5th	6th	7th	8th	9th	10th	11th	12th	13th	14th	15th	Total: €102,250
€15,000	€11,500	€9,000	€7,500	€6,000	€5,800	€4,400	€4,000	€3,600	€3,200	€3,000	€2,800	€2,600	€2,400	€2,250	Total: €102,250
16th	17th	18th	19th	20th	21st	22nd	23rd	24th	25th	26th	27th	28th	29th	30th	Total: €102,250
€2,100	€1,950	€1,800	€1,650	€1,500	€1,400	€1,300	€1,200	€1,100	€1,000	€900	€800	€700	€600	€500	Total: €102,250

=== Men's and mixed team ===
1st	2nd	3rd	4th	5th	6th	7th	8th	Total: €97,800
€34,000	€24,000	€14,000	€9,200	€6,000	€4,700	€3,500	€2,400	Total: €97,800

=== Women's Individual ===
Normal and Large hill
1st	2nd	3rd	4th	5th	6th	7th	8th	9th	10th	11th	12th	13th	14th	15th	Total: €35,200
€5,000	€4,000	€3,000	€2,600	€2,250	€2,000	€1,800	€1,600	€1,400	€1,300	€1,200	€1,100	€1,000	€900	€800	Total: €35,200
16th	17th	18th	19th	20th	21st	22nd	23rd	24th	25th						Total: €35,200
€750	€700	€650	€600	€550	€500	€450	€400	€350	€300						Total: €35,200

== Retirements ==
The following notable ski jumpers, who competed in the World Cup, retire during or after the 2026–27 season:

Women

- (Japan) Yuki Ito
