= FIS Nordic World Ski Championships 2023 – Women's 10 kilometre freestyle =

Women's 10 kilometre freestyle at the FIS Nordic World Ski Championships 2023
- Venue: Planica Nordic Centre
- Location: Planica, Slovenia
- Dates: 22 February (qualification); 28 February
- Competitors: 81 from 33 nations
- Winning time: 23:40.8

Medalists
gold medal	Jessie Diggins	United States
silver medal	Frida Karlsson	Sweden
bronze medal	Ebba Andersson	Sweden

The Women's 10 kilometre freestyle competition at the FIS Nordic World Ski Championships 2023 was held on 22 and 28 February 2023.

== Results ==
=== Final ===
The final was started at 12:30.

Rank	Bib	Athlete	Country	Time	Deficit
1st place, gold medalist(s)	38	Jessie Diggins	United States	23:40.8	
2nd place, silver medalist(s)	36	Frida Karlsson	Sweden	23:54.8	+14.0
3rd place, bronze medalist(s)	42	Ebba Andersson	Sweden	24:00.3	+19.5
4	60	Anne Kjersti Kalvå	Norway	24:15.9	+35.1
5	56	Ingvild Flugstad Østberg	Norway	24:27.4	+46.6
6	14	Francesca Franchi	Italy	24:32.0	+51.2
7	23	Pia Fink	Germany	24:34.0	+53.2
8	50	Nadine Fähndrich	Switzerland	24:36.4	+55.6
9	40	Kerttu Niskanen	Finland	24:37.4	+56.6
10	20	Maja Dahlqvist	Sweden	24:39.3	+58.5
11	58	Katharina Hennig	Germany	24:42.9	+1:02.1
12	54	Tiril Udnes Weng	Norway	24:43.5	+1:02.7
13	15	Flora Dolci	France	24:43.6	+1:02.8
14	48	Victoria Carl	Germany	24:47.3	+1:06.5
15	34	Rosie Brennan	United States	24:54.9	+1:14.1
16	21	Evelina Piippo	Finland	24:55.3	+1:14.5
17	44	Krista Pärmäkoski	Finland	24:56.2	+1:15.4
18	27	Kateřina Janatová	Czech Republic	25:00.9	+1:20.1
19	46	Patrīcija Eiduka	Latvia	25:01.3	+1:20.5
20	22	Eva Urevc	Slovenia	25:04.1	+1:23.3
21	30	Jonna Sundling	Sweden	25:05.8	+1:25.0
22	19	Kateřina Razýmová	Czech Republic	25:10.3	+1:29.5
23	32	Delphine Claudel	France	25:16.5	+1:35.7
24	52	Silje Theodorsen	Norway	25:17.3	+1:36.5
25	25	Sophia Laukli	United States	25:25.0	+1:44.2
26	17	Juliette Ducordeau	France	25:27.5	+1:46.7
27	29	Katherine Stewart-Jones	Canada	25:37.4	+1:56.6
28	12	Anja Mandeljc	Slovenia	25:39.3	+1:58.5
29	13	Izabela Marcisz	Poland	25:45.9	+2:05.1
30	47	Federica Sanfilippo	Italy	25:48.5	+2:07.7
31	11	Sofie Krehl	Germany	25:51.5	+2:10.7
32	24	Jasmi Joensuu	Finland	25:54.2	+2:13.4
33	5	Martina Di Centa	Italy	26:04.1	+2:23.3
34	28	Julia Kern	United States	26:09.9	+2:29.1
35	18	Anja Weber	Switzerland	26:11.6	+2:30.8
36	3	Jasmine Lyons	Canada	26:16.9	+2:36.1
37	26	Masako Ishida	Japan	26:23.7	+2:42.9
38	1	Liliane Gagnon	Canada	26:36.9	+2:56.1
39	10	Miki Kodama	Japan	26:46.4	+3:05.6
40	9	Kseniya Shalygina	Kazakhstan	26:54.2	+3:13.4
41	7	Kaidy Kaasiku	Estonia	27:04.1	+3:23.0
42	2	Nadezhda Stepashkina	Kazakhstan	27:04.8	+3:24.0
43	55	Carola Vila	Andorra	27:08.5	+3:27.7
44	6	Keidy Kaasiku	Estonia	27:15.2	+3:34.4
45	8	Rin Sobue	Japan	27:19.7	+3:38.9
46	4	Dahria Beatty	Canada	27:21.8	+3:41.0
47	61	Phoebe Cridland	Australia	27:22.8	+3:42.0
48	65	Ellen Søhol Lie	Australia	27:28.4	+3:47.6
49	31	Neza Zerjav	Slovenia	27:35.9	+3:55.1
50	62	Anastasiya Ivanchenko	Ukraine	27:37.3	+3:56.5
51	33	Nina Riedener	Liechtenstein	27:44.3	+4:03.5
52	39	Viktoriya Olekh	Ukraine	27:46.4	+4:05.6
53	45	Aisha Rakisheva	Kazakhstan	27:53.1	+4:12.3
54	66	Katya Galstyan	Armenia	27:53.6	+4:12.8
55	63	Kamila Makhmutova	Kazakhstan	27:57.8	+4:17.0
56	72	Anita Klemenčič	Slovenia	28:03.7	+4:22.9
57	76	Sophia Tsu Velicer	Chinese Taipei	28:04.4	+4:23.6
58	67	Kristrún Guðnadóttir	Iceland	28:29.4	+4:48.6
59	51	Kitija Auziņa	Latvia	28:30.3	+4:49.5
60	64	Anastasiya Nikon	Ukraine	28:52.2	+5:11.4
61	49	Weronika Kaleta	Poland	28:55.1	+5:14.3
62	57	Monika Skinder	Poland	28:59.5	+5:18.7
63	79	Jaqueline Mourão	Brazil	29:12.8	+5:32.0
64	68	Enkhbayaryn Ariuntungalag	Mongolia	29:24.5	+5:43.7
65	35	Kalina Nedyalkova	Bulgaria	30:04.4	+6:23.6
66	75	Gígja Björnsdóttir	Iceland	30:13.8	+6:33.0
67	37	Agustina Groetzner	Argentina	30:26.8	+6:46.0
68	74	María Cecilia Domínguez	Argentina	30:41.4	+7:00.6
69	80	Ariunsanaagiin Enkhtuul	Mongolia	30:53.0	+7:12.2
70	69	Tena Hadžić	Croatia	31:03.7	+7:22.9
71	53	Ana Cvetanovska	North Macedonia	31:27.8	+7:47.0
72	59	Anja Ilić	Serbia	31:30.3	+7:49.5
73	43	Nahiara Díaz	Argentina	31:37.1	+7:56.3
74	41	Paraskevi Ladopoulou	Greece	31:52.8	+8:12.0
75	71	Samaneh Beyrami Baher	Iran	32:12.4	+8:31.6
76	81	Bruna Moura	Brazil	32:33.4	+8:52.6
77	77	Anna Rashoyan	Armenia	32:48.2	+9:07.4
78	78	Nefeli Tita	Greece	32:57.7	+9:16.9
79	73	Sara Plakalović	Bosnia and Herzegovina	33:10.7	+9:29.9
80	70	Maria Dimitra Tsiarka	Greece	33:23.4	+9:42.6
	16	Nadja Kälin	Switzerland	Did not finish	

=== Qualification ===
The qualification was started on 22 February at 12:00.

Rank	Bib	Athlete	Country	Time	Deficit	Notes
1	19	Jaqueline Mourão	Brazil	14:42.0		Q
2	38	Lucija Medja	Slovenia	14:49.0	+7.0	Q
3	34	Gígja Björnsdóttir	Iceland	15:16.4	+34.4	Q
4	18	Ariunsanaagiin Enkhtuul	Mongolia	15:22.9	+40.9	Q
5	33	Ieva Dainytė	Lithuania	15:34.5	+52.5	Q
6	36	Sara Plakalović	Bosnia and Herzegovina	15:42.6	+1:00.6	Q
7	27	Anna Rashoyan	Armenia	16:09.5	+1:27.5	Q
8	39	Samaneh Beyrami Baher	Iran	16:12.4	+1:30.4	Q
9	1	Bruna Moura	Brazil	16:14.0	+1:32.0	Q
10	37	Mirlene Picin	Brazil	16:17.6	+1:35.6	Q
11	32	Linda Kaparkalēja	Latvia	16:18.4	+1:36.4	
12	31	Adriāna Šuminska	Latvia	16:36.5	+1:54.5	
13	24	Emilija Bučytė	Lithuania	16:48.0	+2:06.0	
14	22	Leona Garac	Croatia	17:02.9	+2:20.9	
15	35	Eduarda Ribera	Brazil	17:35.6	+2:53.6	
16	20	Gabija Bučytė	Lithuania	17:41.3	+2:59.3	
17	25	Teodora Delipara	Bosnia and Herzegovina	17:46.1	+3:04.1	
18	30	Farnoosh Shemshaki	Iran	17:48.8	+3:06.8	
19	21	Natalia Ayala	Chile	18:10.6	+3:28.6	
20	26	Atefeh Salehi	Iran	18:13.8	+3:31.8	
21	29	Sahel Tir	Iran	18:19.0	+3:37.0	
22	11	Aikaterini Vaikou	Greece	18:49.8	+4:07.8	
23	12	Ariadni Kostouli	Greece	18:50.4	+4:08.4	
24	15	Ana Jeremić	Serbia	19:16.1	+4:34.1	
25	23	Martina Flores	Chile	19:17.0	+4:35.0	
26	3	Sanja Kusmuk	Bosnia and Herzegovina	19:34.8	+4:52.8	
27	13	Lydia Tsiatsiou	Greece	19:39.6	+4:57.6	
28	9	Arina Rusu	Moldova	20:03.8	+5:21.8	
29	7	Karla Schleske	Mexico	20:28.0	+5:46.0	
30	2	Regina Martínez	Mexico	20:30.0	+5:48.0	
31	16	Bhavani Thekkada Nanjunda	India	20:45.5	+6:03.5	
32	14	Melika Jažić	Bosnia and Herzegovina	21:26.1	+6:44.1	
33	8	Huguette Fakhry	Lebanon	22:26.5	+7:44.5	
34	10	Mateja Trajkovska	North Macedonia	23:40.0	+8:58.0	
35	5	Andrea Marković	Serbia	24:09.1	+9:27.1	
36	28	Jeanne Darc Tawk	Lebanon	26:10.6	+11:28.6	
37	6	Sara Josimovska	North Macedonia	27:12.2	+12:30.2	
38	4	Sasha Geagea	Lebanon	32:33.5	+17:51.5	
	17	Daniela Yordanova	Bulgaria	Did not start		
