= Dicenta =

Dicenta is a surname. Notable people with the surname include:

- Joaquín Dicenta (1862–1917), Spanish journalist, novelist, playwright, poet and Republican politician
- Natalia Dicenta (born 1962), Spanish actress and singer

== See also ==
- Di Centa, Italian surname
