= Martina Di Centa =

Italian cross-country skier (born 2000)

Personal information
- Nationality: Italy
- Born: 6 March 2000 (age 26) Tolmezzo, Italy

Sport
- Sport: Skiing
- Club: C.S. Carabinieri

World Cup career
- Seasons: 3 – (2021–present)
- Indiv. starts: 30
- Indiv. podiums: 0
- Team starts: 1
- Team podiums: 0
- Overall titles: 0 – (81st in 2023)
- Discipline titles: 0
- Updated on 27 March 2023

Martina Di Centa (born 6 March 2000) is an Italian cross-country skier. She is the daughter of Italian cross-country skier Giorgio Di Centa. She competed in the 10 km classical, 15 km skiathlon, and 30 km freestyle at the 2022 Winter Olympics.

== Cross-country skiing results ==
All results are sourced from the International Ski Federation (FIS).

=== Olympic Games ===
Year	Age	Individual	Skiathlon	Mass start	Sprint	Relay	Team sprint
2022	21	37	36	34	—	8	—
2026	25	20	28	—	—	6	—

=== World Championships ===
Year	Age	Individual	Skiathlon	Mass start	Sprint	Relay	Team sprint
2021	20	—	35	—	—	—	—
2023	22	33	—	34	—	—	—
2025	24	26	29	—	—	7	—

=== World Cup ===
==== Season standings ====
Season	Age	Discipline standings				Ski Tour standings	
Season	Age	Overall	Distance	Sprint	U23	Nordic Opening	Tour de Ski
2021	21	100	NC	NC	24	—	37
2022	22	105	75	NC	18	—N/a	DNF
2023	23	81	87	84	13	—N/a	32
