= Ski jumping at the 2024 Winter Youth Olympics – Women's individual normal hill =

Women's individual normal hill at the IV Winter Youth Olympic Games
- Venue: Alpensia Ski Jumping Centre
- Dates: 20 January
- Competitors: 33 from 18 nations
- Winning points: 215.7

Medalists
| 1st place, gold medalist(s) | | Taja Bodlaj; Slovenia |
| 2nd place, silver medalist(s) | | Josie Johnson; United States |
| 3rd place, bronze medalist(s) | | Ingvild Synnøve Midtskogen; Norway |

The women's individual normal hill event at the 2024 Winter Youth Olympics will be held on 20 January at the Alpensia Ski Jumping Centre.

== Results ==
The first round was started at 09:50 and the final round at 10:50.

| Rank | Bib | Name | Country | Round 1 | | | Final round | | | Total |
| Rank | Bib | Name | Country | Distance (m) | Points | Rank | Distance (m) | Points | Rank | Points |
|---|---|---|---|---|---|---|---|---|---|---|
| 1st place, gold medalist(s) | 15 | Taja Bodlaj | Slovenia | 107.0 m | 110.5 | 1 | 100.5 m | 105.2 | 2 | 215.7 |
| 2nd place, silver medalist(s) | 31 | Josie Johnson | United States | 100.0 m | 99.2 | 3 | 107.0 m | 108.0 | 1 | 207.2 |
| 3rd place, bronze medalist(s) | 22 | Ingvild Synnøve Midtskogen | Norway | 104.5 m | 109.7 | 2 | 95.0 m | 95.0 | 7 | 204.7 |
| 4 | 27 | Anežka Indráčková | Czech Republic | 97.0 m | 95.4 | 4 | 100.3 m | 101.8 | 4 | 197.3 |
| 5 | 10 | Kjersti Græsli | Norway | 95.0 m | 89.3 | 6 | 101.0 m | 100.1 | 5 | 189.4 |
| 6 | 17 | Yuzuki Sato | Japan | 92.5 m | 83.1 | 8 | 101.5 m | 103.1 | 3 | 186.2 |
| 7 | 30 | Ajda Košnjek | Slovenia | 91.0 m | 80.0 | 11 | 99.0 m | 98.4 | 6 | 178.4 |
| 8 | 28 | Sofia Mattila | Finland | 96.0 m | 90.0 | 5 | 94.0 m | 83.6 | 10 | 173.6 |
| 9 | 18 | Anna-Fay Scharfenberg | Germany | 90.5 m | 80.5 | 10 | 97.5 m | 92.4 | 8 | 172.9 |
| 10 | 32 | Lilou Zepchi | France | 90.5 m | 82.0 | 9 | 95.5 | 89.7 | 9 | 171.7 |
| 11 | 21 | Weng Yangning | China | 96.5 m | 88.9 | 7 | 92.5 m | 76.7 | 11 | 165.4 |
| 12 | 11 | Sara Pokorny | Austria | 90.0 m | 75.0 | 12 | 87.0 m | 71.0 | 13 | 146.0 |
| 13 | 33 | Meghann Wadsak | Austria | 88.0 m | 72.5 | 14 | 84.0 m | 64.1 | 17 | 136.6 |
| 14 | 16 | Pola Bełtowska | Poland | 81.5 m | 61.2 | 16 | 86.5 m | 70.2 | 14 | 131.4 |
| 15 | 14 | Kim Amy Duschek | Germany | 88.5 m | 72.8 | 13 | 80.5 m | 55.8 | 19 | 128.6 |
| 16 | 6 | Estella Hassrick | United States | 82.5 m | 60.1 | 17 | 85.5 m | 67.5 | 16 | 127.6 |
| 17 | 20 | Noelia Vuerich | Italy | 87.5 m | 69.4 | 15 | 81.5 m | 57.4 | 18 | 126.8 |
| 18 | 24 | Tamara Mesíková | Slovakia | 77.0 m | 50.5 | 20 | 90.0 m | 76.0 | 12 | 126.5 |
| 19 | 4 | Camilla Comazzi | Italy | 70.5 m | 40.0 | 22 | 86.0 m | 68.6 | 15 | 108.6 |
| 20 | 5 | Hana Sakurai | Japan | 78.5 m | 53.3 | 19 | 77.0 m | 50.0 | 21 | 103.3 |
| 21 | 7 | Zhanna Hlukhova | Ukraine | 81.0 m | 55.4 | 18 | 74.0 m | 42.7 | 23 | 98.1 |
| 22 | 3 | Sara Tajner | Poland | 68.5 m | 28.9 | 25 | 77.0 m | 47.8 | 22 | 76.7 |
| 23 | 12 | Tang Jiahong | China | 73.0 m | 42.3 | 21 | 67.0 m | 33.7 | 25 | 76.0 |
| 24 | 8 | Emilia Vidgren | Finland | 65.0 m | 23.5 | 27 | 76.0 m | 50.8 | 20 | 74.3 |
| 25 | 13 | Mathilde Bacconnier | France | 69.5 m | 30.9 | 24 | 73.5 m | 39.8 | 24 | 70.7 |
| 26 | 29 | Celina Wasser | Switzerland | 69.5 m | 34.8 | 23 | 65.0 m | 28.8 | 27 | 63.6 |
| 27 | 25 | Alyona Sviridenko | Kazakhstan | 66.5 m | 26.1 | 26 | 69.0 m | 27.8 | 28 | 53.9 |
| 28 | 2 | Natalie Nejedlová | Czech Republic | 60.5 m | 17.3 | 29 | 66.5 m | 29.9 | 26 | 47.2 |
| 29 | 9 | Sofya Shishkina | Kazakhstan | 63.5 m | 20.1 | 28 | 65.0 m | 24.3 | 29 | 44.4 |
| 30 | 23 | Daryna Ilchuk | Ukraine | 61.5 m | 12.2 | 30 | 65.5 m | 21.7 | 30 | 33.9 |
| 31 | 26 | Esmiralda Alievi | Georgia | 33.0 m | 0.0 | 31 | 39.0 m | 0.0 | 31 | 0.0 |
| 32 | 19 | Szerena Maria Stanciu | Romania | 45.0 m | 0.0 | 32 | 43.5 m | 0.0 | 31 | 0.0 |
| 33 | 1 | Andra Maria Gheorghe | Romania | 53.0 m | 0.0 | 33 | 41.0 m | 0.0 | 31 | 0.0 |
