= Di Centa =

Di Centa is an Italian surname. Notable people with the surname include:

- Giorgio Di Centa (born 1972), Italian cross-country skier
- Manuela Di Centa (born 1963), Italian cross-country skier, sister of Giorgio
- Martina Di Centa (born 2000), Italian cross-country skier

== See also ==
- Dicenta, Spanish surname
