= Centa =

Centa may refer to:

- Čenta, Serbia, a village
- Centa, Velike Lašče, Slovenia, a settlement
- Antonio Centa (1907–1979), Italian actor
- Centa (river), Italian river

== See also ==
- Di Centa, surname
