= Henry Loher =

American ski jumper

Personal information
- Born: July 5, 2008 (age 18) New Hampshire, US

Sport
- Sport: Ski jumping
- Club: New York Ski Education Foundation

World Cup career
- Seasons: 2027–present
- Indiv. starts: 1
- Team starts: 1
- Updated on 21 November 2026

Henry Loher (born 5 July 2008) is an American ski jumper.

== Career ==
On 24 October 2026 he reached 6th place at Grand Prix season final at Klingenthal, Germany.

On 21 November 2026 he debuted in individual World Cup season openinng event in Lillehammer, Norway, where he took 27th place and first World Cup points.

== World Cup ==
=== Standings ===
Season	Overall	4H	SF
2026–27	27		

=== Individual starts (1) ===
winner (1); second (2); third (3); did not compete (–); failed to qualify (q); disqualified (DQ)
Season	1	2	3	4	5	6	7	8	9	10	11	12	13	14	15	16	17	18	19	20	21	22	23	24	25	26	27	Points
2026–27	Lillehammer	Lillehammer	Ruka	Ruka	Wisła	Wisła	Titisee-Neustadt	Titisee-Neustadt	Engelberg	Engelberg	Oberstdorf	Garmisch-Partenkirchen	Innsbruck	Bischofshofen	Zakopane	Sapporo	Sapporo	Willingen	Willingen	Lake Placid	Lahti	Vikersund	Vikersund	Oslo	Oslo	Planica	Planica	4
2026–27	27																											4
