= Rosie Fordham =

Australian cross-country skier (born 2002)

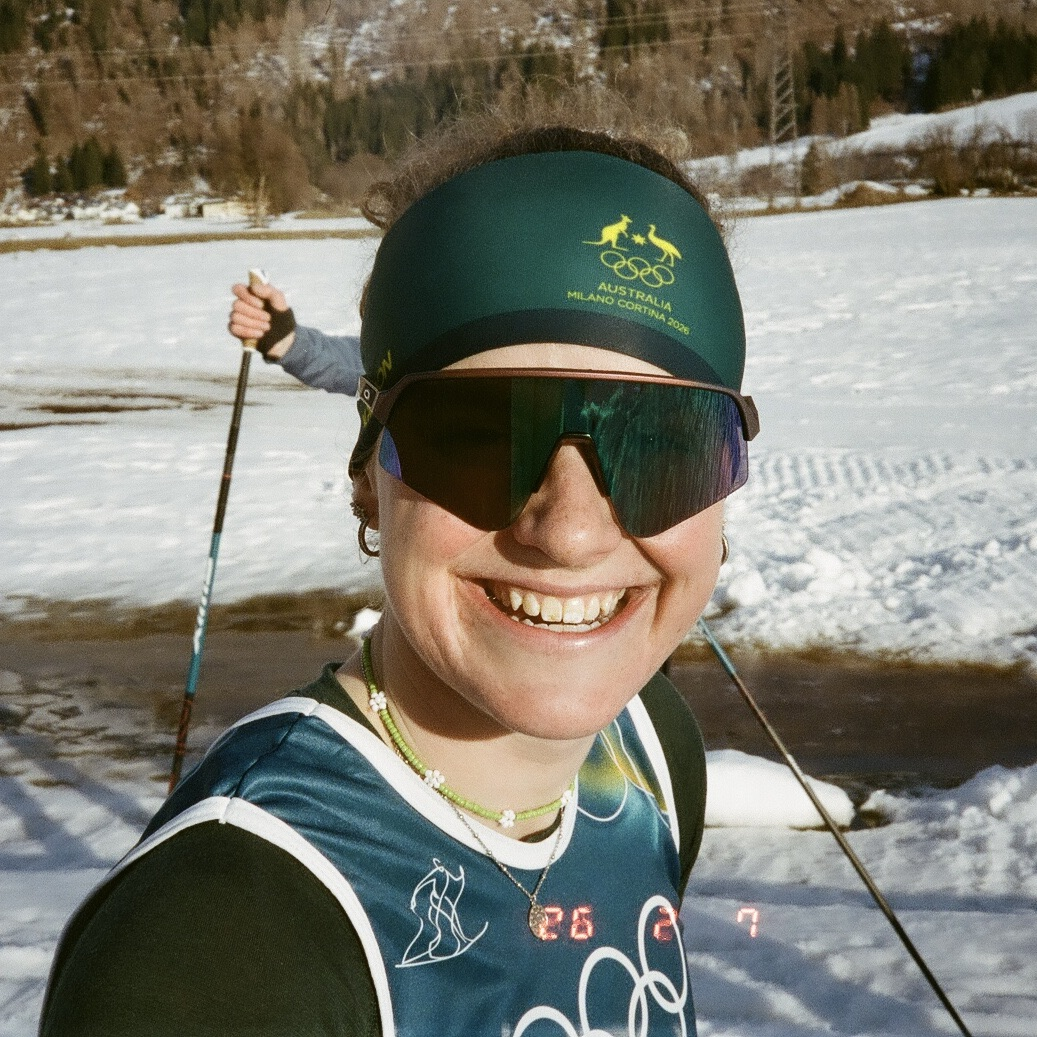

Personal information
- Full name: Rosie Georgina Haysom Fordham
- Nationality: Australia
- Born: 7 May 2002 (age 24) Camperdown, New South Wales, Australia
- Height: 1.72 m (5 ft 8 in)

Sport
- Sport: Skiing

World Cup career
- Seasons: 3 – (2023–present)
- Indiv. starts: 27
- Team starts: 2
Medal record
Junior World Championships
Silver medal – second place	2025 Schilpario	10 km freestyle
- Updated on 23 February 2026

Rosie Georgina Haysom Fordham (born 7 May 2002) is an Australian cross-country skier. She made her World Cup debut in 2023, in Goms, Switzerland.

Fordham finished second in the 10k interval start freestyle event at the 2025 Nordic Junior World Ski Championships on 8 February 2025 in Schilpario, Italy. In 2025, Fordham secured Australia's top individual World Cup results by finishing 13th in the 10k interval start freestyle event in Davos, Switzerland. She posted Australia's best ever olympic result in cross-country skiing at the 2026 Winter Olympic Games during the 50K mass start event, finishing 29th.

== Cross-country skiing results ==
All results are sourced from the International Ski Federation (FIS).

=== Olympic Games ===
Year	Age	10 km individual	20 km skiathlon	50 km mass start	Sprint	4 × 7.5 km relay	Team sprint
2026	23	33	49	29	—	14	18

=== World Championships ===
Year	Age	10 km individual	20 km skiathlon	50 km mass start	Sprint	4 × 7.5 km relay	Team sprint
2025	22	37	38	20	44	12	15

=== World Cup ===
==== Season standings ====
Season	Age	Discipline standings				Ski Tour standings			
Season	Age	Overall	Distance	Sprint	U23	Nordic Opening	Tour de Ski	Ski Tour 2020	World Cup Final
2024	21	180	148	NC	58	—N/a	—N/a	—N/a	—N/a
2025	22	106	72	NC	18	—N/a	—N/a	—N/a	—N/a
2026	23	73	45	NC	—N/a	—N/a	—N/a	—N/a	—N/a

==== Individual podiums ====
- 1 podiums – (1 U23WC)

No.	Season	Date	Location	Race	Level	Place
1	2024–25	8 February 2025	Schilpario, Italy	10 km Individual F	U23 World Championship	2nd
