= Taja Bodlaj =

Slovenian ski jumper (born 2006)

Personal information
- Born: 29 May 2006 (age 20)

Sport
- Sport: Ski jumping
Medal record
Women's ski jumping
Representing Slovenia
Winter Youth Olympics
Gold medal – first place	2024 Gangwon	Individual NH
Gold medal – first place	2024 Gangwon	Mixed team NH
Junior World Championships
Gold medal – first place	2022 Zakopane	Team NH
Gold medal – first place	2024 Planica	Team NH
Gold medal – first place	2025 Lake Placid	Mixed team NH
Silver medal – second place	2022 Zakopane	Individual NH
Silver medal – second place	2022 Zakopane	Mixed team NH
Silver medal – second place	2023 Whistler	Team NH
Silver medal – second place	2024 Planica	Mixed team NH
Silver medal – second place	2025 Lake Placid	Team NH
Bronze medal – third place	2024 Planica	Individual NH
Bronze medal – third place	2025 Lake Placid	Individual NH

Taja Bodlaj (born 29 May 2006) is a Slovenian ski jumper. She is a three-time Junior World Champion.

== Career ==
Bodlaj made her Junior World Ski Championships debut in 2022 and won a gold medal in the team normal hill. She also won a silver medal in the individual normal hill and mixed team normal hill events. During the 2023 Nordic Junior World Ski Championships she won a silver medal in the team normal hill event.

Bodlaj represented Slovenia at the 2024 Winter Youth Olympics and won a gold medal in the normal hill event with a score of 215.7 points. She also won a gold medal in the mixed team normal hill event. She then competed at the 2024 Nordic Junior World Ski Championships and won a gold medal in the team normal hill. She also won a silver medal in the mixed team normal hill and a bronze medal in the individual normal hill.

She competed at the 2025 Nordic Junior World Ski Championships and won a gold medal in the mixed team normal hill event. She also won a silver medal in the team normal hill and a bronze medal in the individual normal hill events.
