= Alison Mackie =

Canadian cross-country skier (born 2005)

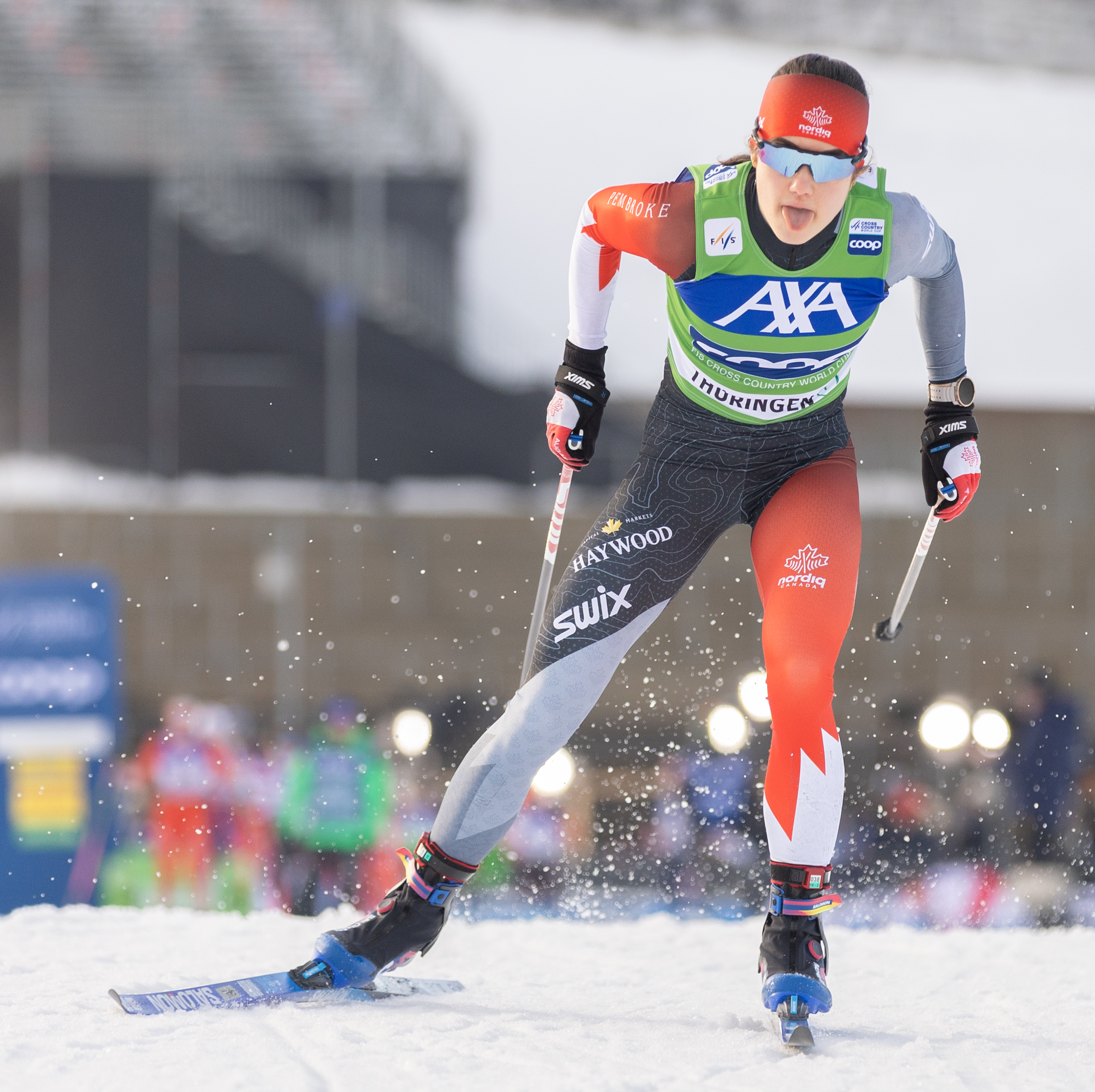

Personal information
- Nationality: Canada
- Born: October 8, 2005 (age 20) Montreal, Quebec, Canada

Sport
- Sport: Skiing
Medal record
Women's cross-country skiing
Representing Canada
U23 World Championships
Gold medal – first place	2026 Lillehammer	20 km freestyle
Junior World Championships
Bronze medal – third place	2025 Schilpario	10 km freestyle
Bronze medal – third place	2025 Schilpario	20 km classical
- Updated on December 23, 2025

Alison Mackie (born October 8, 2005) is a Canadian cross-country skier.

== Career ==
At the 2023 Nordic Junior World Ski Championships, Mackie finished 13th in the 20 km event. Two years later, Mackie won two bronze medals at the 2025 Nordic Junior World Ski Championships in Schilpario, Italy. By doing so, Mackie became the first Canadian women ever to win a medal at the Nordic Junior World Ski Championships since 1989.

On December 19, 2025, Alison was officially named to Canada's 2026 Olympic team. In December 2025, Mackie finished fifth in a World Cup stop, her best placement ever.

On March 5, 2026, Alison won gold in the 20k mass start event of the U23 World Championships.
