= Liliane Gagnon =

Canadian cross-country skier (born 2002)

Personal information
- Nationality: Canada
- Born: December 28, 2002 (age 23) Shawinigan-Sud, Quebec, Canada

Sport
- Sport: Skiing
Medal record
FIS Nordic Junior World Ski Championships
Gold medal – first place	2024 Planica	Mixed U23 4 × 5 Km relay
Bronze medal – third place	2025 Schilpario	Women's U23 10 Km
Bronze medal – third place	2025 Schilpario	Women's U23 20 km
- Updated on December 20, 2025

Liliane Gagnon (born December 15, 2002) is a Canadian cross-country skier. Gagnon is a multiple time medalist at the Nordic Junior World Ski Championships.

== Career ==
Gagnon first represented Canada on the international stage at the 2020 Winter Youth Olympics in Lausanne, Switzerland. At the 2023 Nordic Junior World Ski Championships, Gagnon placed 12th in the U23 women's 20-kilometre mass start classic. Gagnon was part of the gold medal-winning team in the mixed U23 4 × 5 km relay at the 2024 Nordic Junior World Ski Championships in Planica, Slovenia. The following year, Gagnon won two bronze medals in the ten and 20 km individual races at the 2025 Nordic Junior World Ski Championships in Schilpario, Italy.

On December 19, 2025, Gagnon was officially named to Canada's 2026 Olympic team.

== Cross-country skiing results ==
All results are sourced from the International Ski Federation (FIS).

=== Olympic Games ===
Year	Age	Individual	Skiathlon	Mass start	Sprint	Relay	Team sprint
2026	23	17	—	—	—	8	6
