= Kateřina Janatová =

Czech cross-country skier (born 1997)

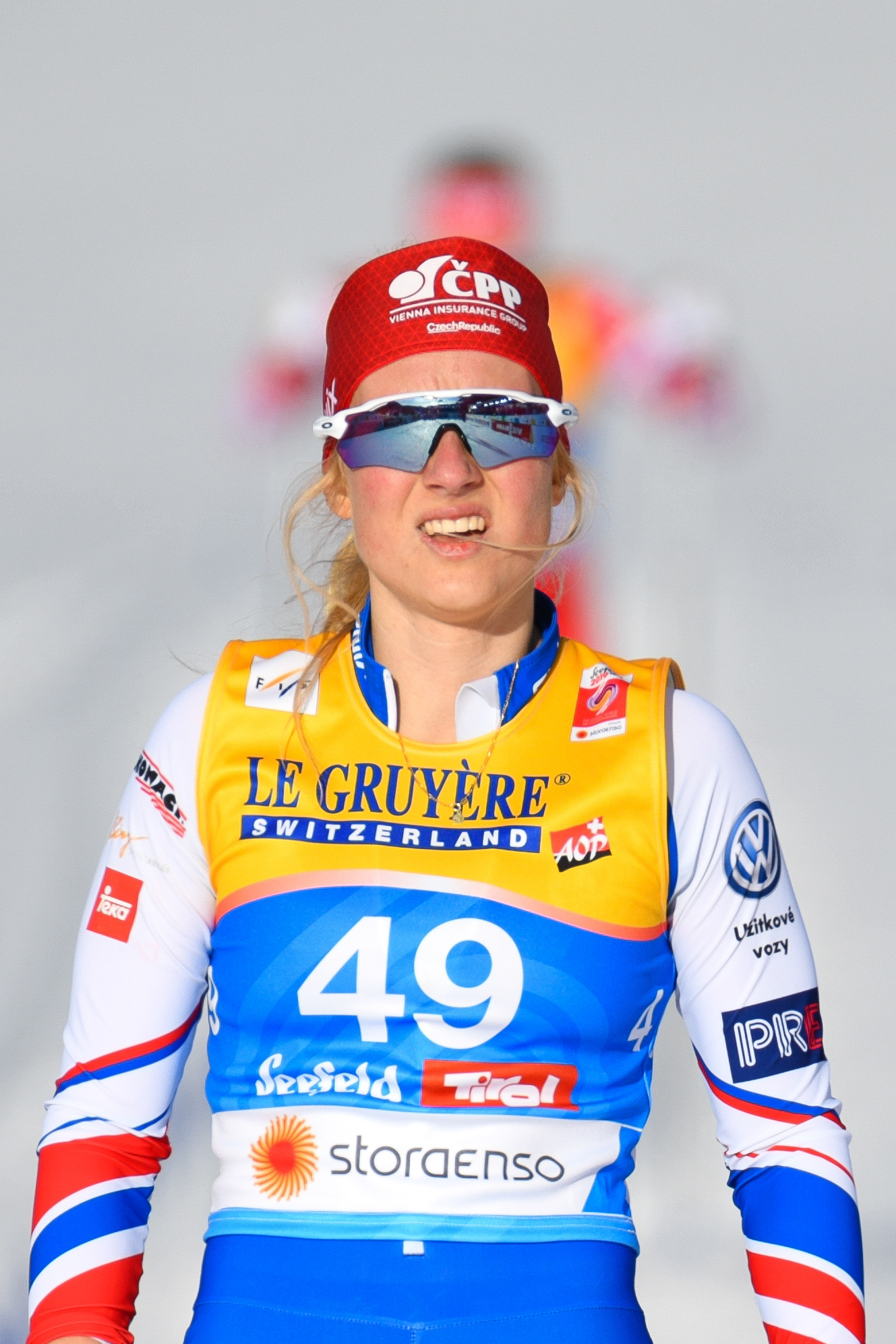
- Kateřina Janatová in 2019

Personal information
- Nationality: Czech Republic
- Born: 13 March 1997 (age 29) Jilemnice, Czech Republic

Sport
- Sport: Skiing
- Club: Dukla Liberec

World Cup career
- Seasons: 8 – (2016, 2018–present)
- Indiv. starts: 108
- Indiv. podiums: 0
- Team starts: 10
- Team podiums: 0
- Overall titles: 0 – (23rd in 2023)
- Discipline titles: 0
- Updated on 7 January 2024

Kateřina Janatová (born 13 March 1997) is a Czech cross-country skier. She competed in the Women's 10 kilometre classical, and Women's sprint, and 30 kilometre freestyle, at the 2022 Winter Olympics. She competed at the 2021–22 FIS Cross-Country World Cup.

Janatová placed seventh in 20 kilometre skiathlon at the 2026 Winter Olympics.

== Cross-country skiing results ==
All results are sourced from the International Ski Federation (FIS).

=== Olympic Games ===
Year	Age	10 km individual	15 km skiathlon	30 km mass start	Sprint	4 × 5 km relay	Team sprint
2022	24	34	—	22	19	13	15

=== World Championships ===
Year	Age	10 km individual	15 km skiathlon	30 km mass start	Sprint	4 × 5 km relay	Team sprint
2019	21	60	—	—	41	—	13
2021	23	21	—	—	32	8	8
2023	25	18	33	DNS	17	9	7

=== World Cup ===
==== Season standings ====
Season	Age	Discipline standings				Ski Tour standings				
Season	Age	Overall	Distance	Sprint	U23	Nordic Opening	Tour de Ski	Ski Tour 2020	World Cup Final	Ski Tour Canada
2016	19	NC	NC	—	NC	—	—	—N/a	—N/a	—
2018	21	NC	NC	NC	NC	70	DNF	—N/a	—	—N/a
2019	22	115	NC	81	30	—	DNF	—N/a	—	—N/a
2020	23	47	44	33	7	DNF	27	DNF	—N/a	—N/a
2021	24	41	65	17	—N/a	48	39	—N/a	—N/a	—N/a
2022	25	38	71	21	—N/a	—N/a	27	—N/a	—N/a	—N/a
2023	26	23	27	23	—N/a	—N/a	24	—N/a	—N/a	—N/a
2024	27	13	25	18	—N/a	—N/a	18	—N/a	—N/a	—N/a
