= Ingvild Synnøve Midtskogen =

Norwegian ski jumper (born 2007)

Ingvild Midtskogen
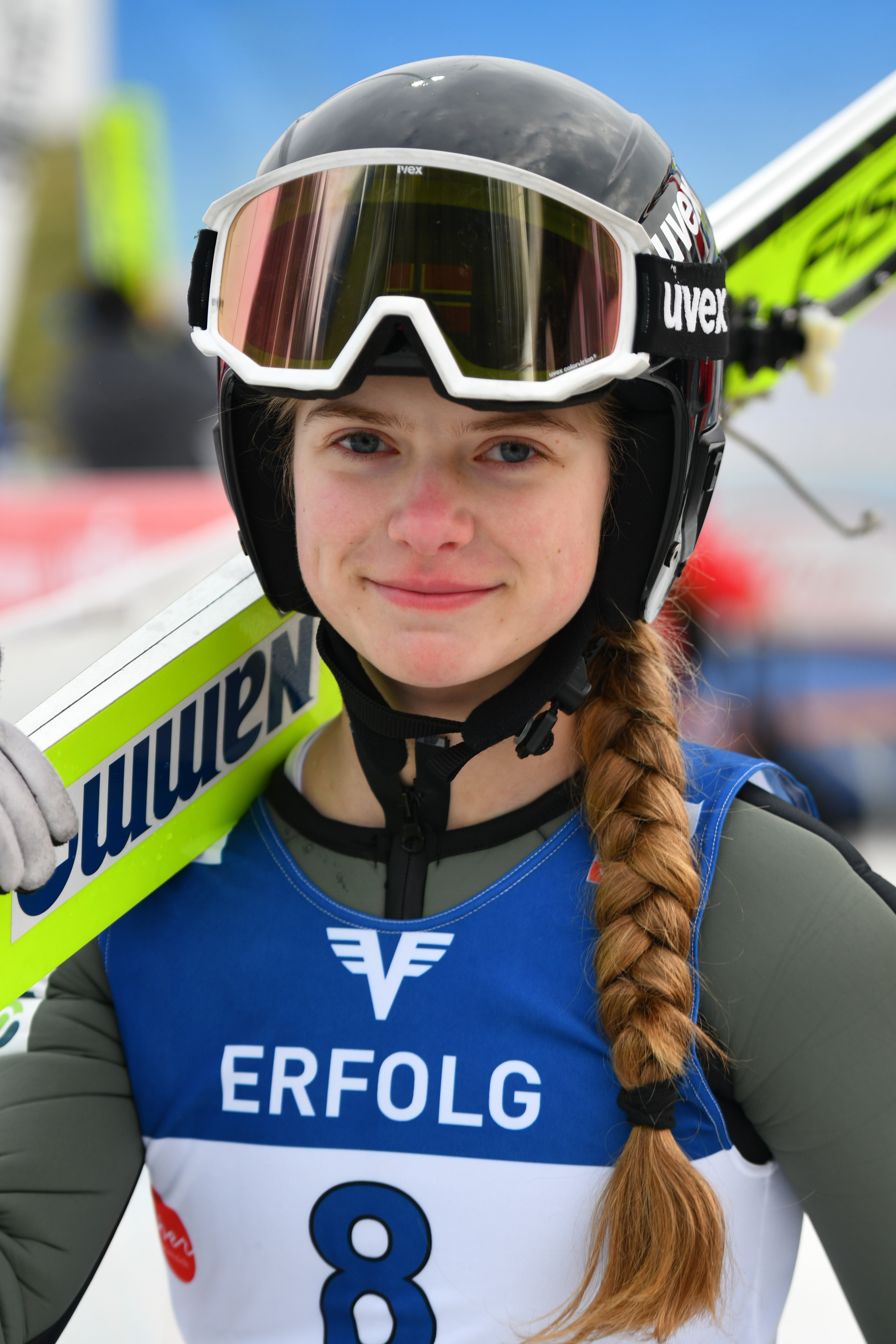

Personal information
- Full name: Ingvild Synnøve Midtskogen
- Nationality: Norway
- Born: 21 December 2007 (age 18)

Sport
- Sport: Skiing
Medal record
Women's ski jumping
Representing Norway
World Championships
Gold medal – first place	2025 Trondheim	Team NH
Junior World Championships
Gold medal – first place	2025 Lake Placid	Individual NH
Silver medal – second place	2026 Lillehammer	Individual NH
Winter Youth Olympics
Silver medal – second place	2024 Gangwon	Mixed team NH
Bronze medal – third place	2024 Gangwon	Individual NH

Ingvild Synnøve Midtskogen (born 21 December 2007) is a Norwegian ski jumper. Her achievements include winning an individual gold medal at the junior world championships, and a team gold medal in the world championships in 2025.

== Career ==
Midtskogen won a gold medal in the normal hill at the 2025 Nordic Junior World Ski Championships in Lake Placid.

Representing Norway at the FIS Nordic World Ski Championships 2025 in Trondheim, she qualified for the final in the Individual NH, but was disqualified for problems with her jumping suit. She won a gold medal in women's team normal hill with the Norwegian team at the 2025 world championships, along with Anna Odine Strøm, Heidi Dyhre Traaserud, and Eirin Maria Kvandal. With an age of 17 years and 70 days Midtskogen became the youngest ski jumper to have won a gold medal at Nordic World Championships.
