= Cross-country skiing at the 2022 Winter Olympics – Women's 30 kilometre freestyle =

Women's 30 kilometre freestyle at the XXIV Olympic Winter Games
- Cross-country skiing
- Venue: Kuyangshu Nordic Center and Biathlon Center, Zhangjiakou
- Date: 20 February 2022
- Competitors: 63 from 23 nations
- Winning time: 1:24:50.0

Medalists
1st place, gold medalist(s)		Therese Johaug	Norway
2nd place, silver medalist(s)		Jessie Diggins	United States
3rd place, bronze medalist(s)		Kerttu Niskanen	Finland

The women's 30 kilometre freestyle competition in cross-country skiing at the 2022 Winter Olympics was held on 20 February, at the Kuyangshu Nordic Center and Biathlon Center in Zhangjiakou. Therese Johaug of Norway became the champion, thereby winning all three individual distance events at these Olympics. She was only second woman to do so after Marja-Liisa Kirvesniemi in 1984. Jessie Diggins of the United States won the silver medal, and Kerttu Niskanen of Finland the bronze. For Diggins, this was her first individual Olympic medal.

The day before the race, the start time was moved to 11:00 local time due to adverse weather conditions.

== Summary ==
The 30 km distance event alternates between classical style and free style skiing in succeeding Olympics, and in 2022 it was the free style event. The 2014 and 2018 champion, Marit Bjørgen, retired from competitions. The silver medalist, Krista Pärmäkoski, qualified for the Olympics, and the bronze medalist, Stina Nilsson, switched to biathlon. The overall leader of the 2021–22 FIS Cross-Country World Cup before the Olympics was Natalya Nepryayeva, and the distance leader was Frida Karlsson. Johaug was the 2021 world champion in the 30 km classical.

== Results ==
Rank	Bib	Name	Country	Time	Deficit
1st place, gold medalist(s)	2	Therese Johaug	Norway	1:24:54.0	—
2nd place, silver medalist(s)	4	Jessie Diggins	United States	1:26:37.3	+1:43.3
3rd place, bronze medalist(s)	6	Kerttu Niskanen	Finland	1:27:27.3	+2:33.3
4	20	Jonna Sundling	Sweden	1:27:29.4	+2:35.4
5	7	Tatiana Sorina	ROC	1:27:31.2	+2:37.2
6	8	Rosie Brennan	United States	1:27:32.7	+2:38.7
7	12	Delphine Claudel	France	1:27:34.0	+2:40.0
8	3	Ebba Andersson	Sweden	1:27:35.5	+2:41.5
9	23	Mariya Istomina	ROC	1:28:00.1	+3:06.1
10	5	Krista Pärmäkoski	Finland	1:28:35.0	+3:41.0
11	9	Teresa Stadlober	Austria	1:28:36.5	+3:42.5
12	11	Victoria Carl	Germany	1:30:08.4	+5:14.4
13	17	Lotta Udnes Weng	Norway	1:31:14.3	+6:20.3
14	10	Tiril Udnes Weng	Norway	1:31:15.4	+6:21.4
15	37	Sophia Laukli	United States	1:31:21.2	+6:27.2
16	42	Cendrine Browne	Canada	1:31:21.6	+6:27.6
17	16	Anastasia Rygalina	ROC	1:31:22.1	+6:28.1
18	39	Novie McCabe	United States	1:31:22.5	+6:28.5
19	34	Antonia Fräbel	Germany	1:31:23.6	+6:29.6
20	18	Anne Kyllönen	Finland	1:31:41.0	+6:47.0
21	30	Izabela Marcisz	Poland	1:31:43.0	+6:49.0
22	36	Kateřina Janatová	Czech Republic	1:31:43.2	+6:49.2
23	14	Johanna Matintalo	Finland	1:32:01.7	+7:07.7
24	38	Flora Dolci	France	1:32:04.7	+7:10.7
25	19	Pia Fink	Germany	1:32:06.3	+7:12.3
26	24	Masako Ishida	Japan	1:32:06.3	+7:12.3
27	32	Lydia Hiernickel	Switzerland	1:32:12.3	+7:18.3
28	13	Ragnhild Haga	Norway	1:32:19.9	+7:25.9
29	21	Emma Ribom	Sweden	1:32:27.8	+7:33.8
30	22	Katherine Stewart-Jones	Canada	1:32:33.3	+7:39.3
31	60	Baiba Bendika	Latvia	1:33:37.8	+8:43.8
32	29	Patrīcija Eiduka	Latvia	1:33:51.2	+8:57.2
33	45	Cristina Pittin	Italy	1:33:54.8	+9:00.8
34	47	Martina Di Centa	Italy	1:33:56.6	+9:02.6
35	15	Charlotte Kalla	Sweden	1:34:45.4	+9:51.4
36	41	Masae Tsuchiya	Japan	1:34:47.6	+9:53.6
37	44	Maryna Antsybor	Ukraine	1:35:31.3	+10:37.3
38	27	Chi Chunxue	China	1:35:41.0	+10:47.0
39	33	Dahria Beatty	Canada	1:36:08.2	+11:14.2
40	26	Anna Comarella	Italy	1:36:12.4	+11:18.4
41	49	Petra Hynčicová	Czech Republic	1:36:26.6	+11:32.6
42	50	Angelina Shuryga	Kazakhstan	1:36:29.6	+11:35.6
43	52	Jessica Yeaton	Australia	1:37:06.1	+12:12.1
44	25	Coralie Bentz	France	1:38:08.2	+13:14.2
45	46	Caterina Ganz	Italy	1:38:19.5	+13:25.5
46	40	Li Xin	China	1:38:39.2	+13:45.2
47	35	Bayani Jialin	China	1:39:14.8	+14:20.8
48	53	Carola Vila	Andorra	1:39:18.1	+14:24.1
49	58	Nadezhda Stepashkina	Kazakhstan	1:39:38.8	+14:44.8
50	43	Miki Kodama	Japan	1:39:53.8	+14:59.8
51	64	Laura Leclair	Canada	1:40:14.5	+15:20.5
52	54	Vedrana Malec	Croatia	1:41:18.6	+16:24.6
53	62	Neža Žerjav	Slovenia	1:42:14.2	+17:20.2
54	51	Irina Bykova	Kazakhstan	1:42:42.0	+17:48.0
55	48	Chika Kobayashi	Japan	1:43:33.1	+18:39.1
56	65	Casey Wright	Australia	1:44:19.9	+19:25.9
57	61	Magdalena Kobielusz	Poland	1:44:48.8	+19:54.8
58	57	Viktoriya Olekh	Ukraine	1:46:22.1	+21:28.1
59	55	Anita Klemenčič	Slovenia	1:46:37.6	+21:43.6
60	28	Dinigeer Yilamujiang	China	1:50:04.2	+25:10.2
61	59	Maria Ntanou	Greece	Lapped	
	1	Natalya Nepryayeva	ROC	Did not finish	
	31	Petra Nováková	Czech Republic	Did not finish	
	56	Hanna Karaliova	Belarus	Did not start	
	63	Sanja Kusmuk	Bosnia and Herzegovina	Did not start	
