= Josie Johnson (ski jumper) =

American ski jumper (born 2006)

Personal information
- Born: October 3, 2006 (age 19) Park City, Utah, U.S.

Sport
- Sport: Ski jumping
Medal record
Women's ski jumping
Representing the United States
Winter Youth Olympics
Silver medal – second place	2024 Gangwon	Individual NH
Junior World Championships
Silver medal – second place	2025 Lake Placid	Mixed team NH

Josie Johnson (born October 3, 2006) is an American ski jumper.

== Career ==
Johnson represented the United States at the 2024 Winter Youth Olympics and won a silver medal in the normal hill event with a score of 207.2 points. She became the first American athlete to medal in ski jumping at the Youth Olympics.

She competed at the 2025 Nordic Junior World Ski Championships and won a silver medal in the mixed team normal hill event. This marked the first medal for the United States in the event in FIS Nordic Junior World Ski Championships history.

In January 2026, she was selected to represent the United States at the 2026 Winter Olympics. On February 7, 2026, during the normal hill event she finished in 27th place. A week later on February 15, 2026, she competed in the large hill, however, she didn't partake in the final due to an injury.
