= 2023 Nordic Junior World Ski Championships =

Nordic skiing event

- Location: Whistler, Canada
- Dates: 28 January – 5 February

The 2023 FIS Nordic Junior World Ski Championships were held from 28 January to 5 February 2023 in Whistler, Canada.

== Schedule ==
All times are local (UTC–8).

Cross-country

| Date | Time | Event |
|---|---|---|
| 28 January | 10:00 | Men's junior sprint classical Women's junior sprint classical |
| 29 January | 10:00 | Men's U23 sprint classical Women's U23 sprint classical |
| 30 January | 10:00 | Women's junior 20 km mass start classical |
| 30 January | 12:30 | Men's junior 20 km mass start classical |
| 31 January | 10:00 | Women's U23 20 km mass start classical |
| 31 January | 12:30 | Men's U23 20 km mass start classical |
| 2 February | 10:00 | Women's junior 10 km freestyle |
| 2 February | 12:00 | Men's junior 10 km freestyle |
| 3 February | 10:00 | Women's U23 10 km freestyle |
| 3 February | 11:30 | Men's U23 10 km freestyle |
| 4 February | 10:00 | Mixed junior 4 × 5 km relay |
| 4 February | 12:00 | Mixed U23 4 × 5 km relay |

Nordic combined

| Date | Time | Event |
|---|---|---|
| 1 February | 10:00; 14:00 | Men's team HS104 / 4×5 km |
| 3 February | 09:45; 13:30 | Women's HS104 / 5 km |
| 3 February | 11:30; 14:30 | Men's HS104 / 10 km |
| 4 February | 10:30; 14:00 | Mixed team HS104 / 5+2.5+2.5+5 km |

Ski jumping

| Date | Time | Event |
|---|---|---|
| 2 February | 12:30 | Women's HS104 |
| 2 February | 15:00 | Men's HS104 |
| 4 February | 12:30 | Men's team HS104 |
| 4 February | 15:00 | Women's team HS104 |
| 5 February | 11:00 | Mixed team HS104 |

== Medal summary ==
=== Junior events ===
==== Cross-country skiing ====
| Event | Gold | | Silver | | Bronze | |
|---|---|---|---|---|---|---|
Men's Junior Events
| Sprint classical | Anton Grahn; Sweden | 2:48.95 | Elias Danielsson; Sweden | 2:50.14 | Eero Rantala; Finland | 2:48.07 |
| 10 kilometre freestyle | Niko Anttola; Finland | 23:35.4 | Lars Heggen; Norway | 23:41.4 | Thomas Linnebo Mollestad; Norway | 23:42.7 |
| 20 kilometre mass start classical | Mathias Holbæk; Norway | 53:05.7 | Niko Anttola; Finland | 53:13.4 | Kristian Kollerud; Norway | 53:33.8 |
Women's Junior Events
| Sprint classical | Eevi-Inkeri Tossavainen; Finland | 3:11.14 | Milla Grosberghaugen Andreassen; Norway | 3:13.55 | Lisa Eriksson; Sweden | 3:13.68 |
| 10 kilometre freestyle | Milla Grosberghaugen Andreassen; Norway | 26:55.7 | Tuva Anine Brusveen-Jensen; Norway | 27:01.8 | Marina Kälin; Switzerland | 27:11.0 |
| 20 kilometre mass start classical | Milla Grosberghaugen Andreassen; Norway | 1:01:17.6 | Lisa Eriksson; Sweden | 1:01:38.8 | Eevi-Inkeri Tossavainen; Finland | 1:01:51.5 |
Mixed Junior Events
| 4 × 5 kilometre relay | Norway Milla Grosberghaugen Andreassen; Lars Heggen; Tuva Anine Brusveen-Jensen; Mathias Holbæk | 51:32.7 | Sweden Lisa Eriksson; Elias Danielsson; Tove Eriksson; Erik Bergström | 52:06.2 | Italy Iris De Martin Pinter; Davide Ghio; Nadine Laurent; Aksel Artusi | 52:12.9 |

==== Nordic combined ====
| Event | Gold | | Silver | | Bronze | |
|---|---|---|---|---|---|---|
Men's Junior Events
| Individual normal hill/10 km | Iacopo Bortolas; Italy | 25:59.2 | Tristan Sommerfeldt; Germany | 26:02.5 | Paul Walcher; Austria | 26:09.1 |
| Team normal hill/4 × 5 km | Germany Richard Stenzel; Pepe Schula; Benedikt Gräbert; Tristan Sommerfeldt | 50:17.8 | Norway Jens Dahlseide Kvamme; Eidar Johan Strøm; Torje Seljeset; Andreas Ottesen | 50:20.7 | Austria Kilian Gütl; Paul Walcher; Samuel Lev; Severin Reiter | 50:20.8 |
Women's Junior Events
| Individual normal hill/5 km | Annika Sieff; Italy | 14:42.9 | Natalie Armbruster; Germany | 14:59.2 | Lisa Hirner; Austria | 15:24.1 |
Mixed Junior Events
| Team normal hill/5+2.5+2.5+5 km | Austria Kilian Gütl; Lisa Hirner; Annalena Slamik; Paul Walcher | 37:01.9 | Germany Benedikt Gräbert; Cindy Haasch; Natalie Armbruster; Tristan Sommerfeldt | 37:04.0 | Italy Manuel Senoner; Greta Pinzani; Annika Sieff; Iacopo Bortolas | 37:20.7 |

==== Ski jumping ====
| Event | Gold | | Silver | | Bronze | |
|---|---|---|---|---|---|---|
Men's Junior Events
| Individual normal hill | Vilho Palosaari; Finland | 257.9 | Jonas Schuster; Austria | 257.3 | Jan Habdas; Poland | 256.3 |
| Team normal hill | Austria Julijan Smid; Louis Obersteiner; Stephan Embacher; Jonas Schuster | 972.5 | Poland Marcin Wróbel; Klemens Joniak; Kacper Tomasiak; Jan Habdas | 966.7 | Slovenia Taj Ekart; Rok Masle; Gorazd Završnik; Maksim Bartolj | 925.8 |
Women's Junior Events
| Individual normal hill | Alexandria Loutitt; Canada | 260.7 | Nika Prevc; Slovenia | 245.8 | Julia Mühlbacher; Austria | 221.1 |
| Team normal hill | Japan Nagomi Nakayama; Yuzuki Sato; Kurumi Ichinohe; Ringo Miyajima | 805.3 | Slovenia Ajda Košnjek; Nika Vetrih; Taja Bodlaj; Nika Prevc | 785.5 | Germany Anne Häckel; Lia Böhme; Anna-Fay Scharfenberg; Michelle Göbel | 725.6 |
Mixed Junior Events
| Team normal hill | Slovenia Ajda Košnjek; Rok Masle; Nika Prevc; Maksim Bartolj | 920.2 | Japan Nagomi Nakayama; Ritsuta Sugiyama; Kurumi Ichinohe; Asahi Sakano | 875.2 | Germany Anna-Fay Scharfenberg; Ben Bayer; Michelle Göbel; Sebastian Schwarz | 873.7 |

=== U23 events ===
==== Cross-country skiing ====
| Event | Gold | | Silver | | Bronze | |
|---|---|---|---|---|---|---|
Men's U23 Events
| Sprint classical | Ansgar Evensen; Norway | 2:44.99 | George Ersson; Sweden | 2:45.89 | Emil Danielsson; Sweden | 2:45.13 |
| 10 kilometre freestyle | Martin Kirkeberg Mørk; Norway | 22:52.1 | Lars Agnar Hjelmeset; Norway | 23:19.0 | Jonas Vika; Norway | 23:35.5 |
| 20 kilometre mass start classical | Jonas Vika; Norway | 54:25.7 | Edvard Sandvik; Norway | 54:27.0 | Julien Arnaud; France | 54:29.3 |
Women's U23 Events
| Sprint classical | Jasmin Kähärä; Finland | 3:10.01 | Kristin Austgulen Fosnæs; Norway | 3:12.81 | Sigrid Leseth Føyen; Norway | 3:13.61 |
| 10 kilometre freestyle | Helen Hoffmann; Germany | 26:13.0 | Izabela Marcisz; Poland | 26:14.5 | Margrethe Bergane; Norway | 26:17.4 |
| 20 kilometre mass start classical | Kristin Austgulen Fosnæs; Norway | 1:01:40.0 | Lisa Lohmann; Germany | 1:01:42.3 | Margrethe Bergane; Norway | 1:01:47.2 |
Mixed U23 Events
| 4 × 5 kilometre relay | France Eve-Ondine Duchaufour; Julien Arnaud; Julie Pierrel; Gaspard Rousset | 51:05.0 | Sweden Louise Lindström; Gustav Kvarnbrink; Moa Hansson; Truls Gisselman | 51:05.5 | Switzerland Nadja Kälin; Nicola Wigger; Anja Weber; Antonin Savary | 51:08.3 |

=== Medal tables ===
==== All events ====
* Host nation (Canada)

| Rank | Nation | Gold | Silver | Bronze | Total |
|---|---|---|---|---|---|
| 1 | Norway | 8 | 7 | 6 | 21 |
| 2 | Finland | 4 | 1 | 2 | 7 |
| 3 | Germany | 2 | 4 | 2 | 8 |
| 4 | Austria | 2 | 1 | 4 | 7 |
| 5 | Italy | 2 | 0 | 2 | 4 |
| 6 | Sweden | 1 | 5 | 2 | 8 |
| 7 | Slovenia | 1 | 2 | 1 | 4 |
| 8 | Japan | 1 | 1 | 0 | 2 |
| 9 | France | 1 | 0 | 1 | 2 |
| 10 | Canada* | 1 | 0 | 0 | 1 |
| 11 | Poland | 0 | 2 | 1 | 3 |
| 12 | Switzerland | 0 | 0 | 2 | 2 |
| Totals (12 entries) | | 23 | 23 | 23 | 69 |

==== Junior events ====
* Host nation (Canada)

| Rank | Nation | Gold | Silver | Bronze | Total |
|---|---|---|---|---|---|
| 1 | Norway | 4 | 4 | 2 | 10 |
| 2 | Finland | 3 | 1 | 2 | 6 |
| 3 | Austria | 2 | 1 | 4 | 7 |
| 4 | Italy | 2 | 0 | 2 | 4 |
| 5 | Germany | 1 | 3 | 2 | 6 |
| 6 | Sweden | 1 | 3 | 1 | 5 |
| 7 | Slovenia | 1 | 2 | 1 | 4 |
| 8 | Japan | 1 | 1 | 0 | 2 |
| 9 | Canada* | 1 | 0 | 0 | 1 |
| 10 | Poland | 0 | 1 | 1 | 2 |
| 11 | Switzerland | 0 | 0 | 1 | 1 |
| Totals (11 entries) | | 16 | 16 | 16 | 48 |

==== Under-23 events ====
| Rank | Nation | Gold | Silver | Bronze | Total |
|---|---|---|---|---|---|
| 1 | Norway | 4 | 3 | 4 | 11 |
| 2 | Germany | 1 | 1 | 0 | 2 |
| 3 | France | 1 | 0 | 1 | 2 |
| 4 | Finland | 1 | 0 | 0 | 1 |
| 5 | Sweden | 0 | 2 | 1 | 3 |
| 6 | Poland | 0 | 1 | 0 | 1 |
| 7 | Switzerland | 0 | 0 | 1 | 1 |
| Totals (7 entries) | | 7 | 7 | 7 | 21 |
