= Cento (disambiguation) =

Cento may refer to:

- The Italian word for "hundred", which is used in compound words as a designation for centuries in Italian culture:
  - Duecento (1200s) [13th century]
  - Trecento (1300s) [in English, the 14th century]
  - Quattrocento (1400s) [15th century]
  - Cinquecento (1500s) [16th century]
  - Seicento (1600s) [17th century]
  - Settecento (1700s) [18th century]
  - Ottocento (1800s) [19th century]
  - Novecento (1900s) [20th century]
- Metodija Andonov-Čento, a World War II Macedonian partisan and politician
- Cento (poetry), a poetic technique of assembling a poem from excerpts of other authors' writings
- Centonization, a similar musical technique
- Cento, Italy
- Čento, North Macedonia
- Dobels Cento, the Olympic medalist horse
- CENTO, the Central Treaty Organization
- Cento (surname), a list of people with the surname
