= 2018–19 FIS Cross-Country World Cup Finals =

International skiing competition

2018–19 FIS Cross-Country World Cup

Ski tour details
- Venue(s): Quebec City, Canada
- Dates: 22–24 March
- Stages: 3: Sprint F 10/15 km C Mass start 10/15 km F Pursuit

Results
Men
	Winner	Johannes Høsflot Klæbo (NOR)
	Second	Alex Harvey (CAN)
	Third	Alexander Bolshunov (RUS)
Women
	Winner	Stina Nilsson (SWE)
	Second	Therese Johaug (NOR)
	Third	Ingvild Flugstad Østberg (NOR)

The 2018–19 FIS Cross-Country World Cup Finals were the 11th edition of the FIS Cross-Country World Cup Finals, an annual cross-country skiing mini-tour event. The three-day event was held in Quebec City, Canada. It began on 22 March 2019 and concluded on 24 March 2019. It was the final competition round of the 2018–19 FIS Cross-Country World Cup.

Johannes Høsflot Klæbo of Norway and Stina Nilsson of Sweden won the two first stages of the mini-tour; a sprint freestyle and a mass start classic. Alex Harvey ended his skiing career with the fastest time on the third stage freestyle pursuit, which secured him both a World Cup race victory and the second place in the World Cup Final overall standings. Therese Johaug of Norway was the Winner of the Day among the women at the last day of the World Cup season. Johannes Høsflot Klæbo and Stina Nilsson won the overall standings by defending their leading positions on the third stage.

== Overall leadership ==
Bonus seconds for the top 30 positions by type
Type		1	2	3	4	5	6	7	8	9	10	11	12	13–15	16–20	21–25	26–30
Finish	Sprint	30	27	24	23	22	21	16	15	14	13	12	11	5	4	3	2
Finish	Mass start	15	10	5	none												
Finish	Pursuit	none															
Intermediate sprint	Mass start	15	12	10	8	6	5	4	3	2	1	none					

The results in the overall standings were calculated by adding each rider's finishing times on each stage. On the sprint stage, the winners were awarded 30 bonus seconds. On the second stage, the three fastest skiers in finish were awarded 15, 10 and 5 bonus seconds, and the ten first skiers to pass the intermediate sprint points were also awarded bonus seconds. No bonus seconds were awarded on the third stage. The skier with the lowest cumulative time was the overall winner of the Cross-Country World Cup Finals.

A total of CHF 240,000, both genders included, was awarded in cash prizes in the race. The overall winners of the World Cup Finals received CHF 22,500, with the second and third placed skiers getting CHF 17,500 and CHF 11,000 respectively. All finishers in the top 20 were awarded money. CHF 5,000 was given to the winners of each stage of the race, with smaller amounts given to places second and third.

Overall leadership by stage
Stage	Men		Women	
Stage	Winner	Overall standings	Winner	Overall standings
1	Johannes Høsflot Klæbo	Johannes Høsflot Klæbo	Stina Nilsson	Stina Nilsson
2	Johannes Høsflot Klæbo	Johannes Høsflot Klæbo	Stina Nilsson	Stina Nilsson
3	Alex Harvey	Johannes Høsflot Klæbo	Therese Johaug	Stina Nilsson
Final		Johannes Høsflot Klæbo	Final	Stina Nilsson

== Overall standings ==
Men's overall standings (1–10)
Rank	Name	Time
1	Johannes Høsflot Klæbo (NOR)	1:07:08.9
2	Alex Harvey (CAN)	+2.8
3	Alexander Bolshunov (RUS)	+2.9
4	Francesco De Fabiani (ITA)	+1:13.3
5	Emil Iversen (NOR)	+1:13.4
6	Federico Pellegrino (ITA)	+1:13.7
7	Simen Hegstad Krüger (NOR)	+1:14.2
8	Didrik Tønseth (NOR)	+1:14.3
9	Sindre Bjørnestad Skar (NOR)	+1:15.1
10	Sjur Røthe (NOR)	+1:16.1

Final overall standings (11–71)
Rank	Name	Time
11	Andrey Larkov (RUS)	+1:50.2
12	Dario Cologna (SUI)	+1:50.4
13	Ristomatti Hakola (FIN)	+1:54.7
14	Hans Christer Holund (NOR)	+2:01.5
15	Viktor Thorn (SWE)	+2:03.4
16	Johan Häggström (SWE)	+2:24.2
17	Andrew Musgrave (GBR)	+2:33.5
18	Andrey Melnichenko (RUS)	+2:45.7
19	Oskar Svensson (SWE)	+2:45.9
20	Erik Bjornsen (USA)	+2:46.2
21	Eirik Brandsdal (NOR)	+2:47.9
22	Jean-Marc Gaillard (FRA)	+2:50.8
23	Adrien Backscheider (FRA)	+2:58.3
24	Florian Notz (GER)	+3:00.0
25	Richard Jouve (FRA)	+3:12.4
26	Simeon Hamilton (USA)	+3:14.8
27	Teodor Peterson (SWE)	+3:20.6
28	Clément Parisse (FRA)	+3:21.4
29	Daniel Rickardsson (SWE)	+3:22.1
30	Pål Golberg (NOR)	+3:22.4
31	Jules Lapierre (FRA)	+3:22.7
32	Andrew Young (GBR)	+3:42.1
33	Karl-Johan Westberg (SWE)	+3:49.5
34	Maurice Manificat (FRA)	+3:51.2
35	Jonas Dobler (GER)	+3:57.9
36	Joni Mäki (FIN)	+4:01.6
37	Denis Spitsov (RUS)	+4:06.1
38	Len Väljas (CAN)	+4:17.8
38	Andreas Katz (GER)	+4:17.8
40	Jens Burman (SWE)	+4:26.7
41	Roman Furger (SUI)	+4:37.2
42	Maicol Rastelli (ITA)	+4:47.4
43	Irineu Esteve Altimiras (AND)	+4:53.9
44	Kevin Bolger (USA)	+5:00.6
45	Scott Patterson (USA)	+5:02.6
46	Lauri Vuorinen (FIN)	+5:27.6
47	Janosch Brugger (GER)	+5:29.5
48	Matti Heikkinen (FIN)	+5:32.9
49	Baptiste Gros (FRA)	+5:36.6
50	Renaud Jay (FRA)	+5:41.3
51	Rémi Drolet (CAN)	+6:02.1
52	Gus Schumacher (USA)	+6:03.0
53	Giandomenico Salvadori (ITA)	+6:31.5
54	Miha Šimenc (SLO)	+6:36.8
55	David Norris (USA)	+6:43.2
56	Russell Kennedy (CAN)	+6:47.1
57	Philippe Boucher (CAN)	+7:05.5
58	James Clugnet (GBR)	+7:12.7
59	Evan Palmer-Charrette (CAN)	+7:13.1
60	Jack Carlyle (CAN)	+7:19.9
61	Antoine Cyr (CAN)	+7:31.8
62	Scott James Hill (CAN)	+7:59.1
63	Alvar Johannes Alev (EST)	+8:00.3
64	Alexis Dumas (CAN)	+8:14.6
65	Logan Hanneman (USA)	+8:23.6
66	Ben Ogden (USA)	+9:04.3
67	Bob Thompson (CAN)	+9:18.0
68	Antoine Briand (CAN)	+9:45.9
69	Benjamin Saxton (USA)	+10:22.9
70	Peter Holmes (USA)	+10:23.4
71	Julian Smith (CAN)	+10:33.4

Women overall standings (1–10)
Rank	Name	Time
1	Stina Nilsson (SWE)	52:12.5
2	Therese Johaug (NOR)	+12.9
3	Ingvild Flugstad Østberg (NOR)	+15.1
4	Krista Pärmäkoski (FIN)	+52.3
5	Ebba Andersson (SWE)	+53.3
6	Jonna Sundling (SWE)	+1:14.1
7	Astrid Uhrenholdt Jacobsen (NOR)	+1:29.2
8	Maja Dahlqvist (SWE)	+1:29.2
9	Frida Karlsson (SWE)	+1:31.9
10	Charlotte Kalla (SWE)	+1:36.7

Final overall standings (11–70)
Rank	Name	Time
11	Sadie Bjornsen (USA)	+1:45.4
12	Natalya Nepryayeva (RUS)	+1:53.0
13	Maiken Caspersen Falla (NOR)	+1:53.2
14	Jessie Diggins (USA)	+1:53.6
15	Ida Ingemarsdotter (SWE)	+1:53.6
16	Anastasia Sedova (RUS)	+1:59.7
17	Katharina Hennig (GER)	+2:08.3
18	Tiril Udnes Weng (NOR)	+2:09.5
19	Evelina Settlin (SWE)	+2:13.6
20	Heidi Weng (NOR)	+2:50.4
21	Sandra Ringwald (GER)	+2:50.9
22	Anamarija Lampič (SLO)	+2:51.2
23	Pia Fink (GER)	+2:52.1
24	Elisa Brocard (ITA)	+2:53.3
25	Kari Øyre Slind (NOR)	+2:53.5
26	Nadine Fähndrich (SUI)	+2:56.5
27	Mari Eide (NOR)	+2:57.8
28	Laura Gimmler (GER)	+3:24.6
29	Teresa Stadlober (AUT)	+3:35.3
30	Anna Comarella (ITA)	+3:52.7
31	Emily Nishikawa (CAN)	+3:53.9
32	Laura Mononen (FIN)	+3:55.2
33	Mariya Istomina (RUS)	+3:56.0
34	Kerttu Niskanen (FIN)	+4:01.2
35	Lucia Scardoni (ITA)	+4:03.2
36	Sophie Caldwell (USA)	+4:05.1
37	Anne Kyllönen (FIN)	+4:10.4
38	Caterina Ganz (ITA)	+4:24.5
39	Rosie Brennan (USA)	+4:41.8
40	Nathalie von Siebenthal (SUI)	+4:45.4
41	Hailey Swirbul (USA)	+5:06.2
42	Eva Urevc (SLO)	+5:15.2
43	Julia Kern (USA)	+5:23.7
44	Katherine Stewart-Jones (CAN)	+5:27.2
45	Dahria Beatty (CAN)	+5:47.7
46	Caitlin Patterson (USA)	+6:11.4
47	Katherine Ogden (USA)	+6:13.9
48	Ida Sargent (USA)	+6:21.9
49	Delphine Claudel (FRA)	+6:23.6
50	Yuliya Belorukova (RUS)	+6:24.7
51	Kendall Kramer (USA)	+6:31.4
52	Kaitlynn Miller (USA)	+6:36.4
53	Jessica Yeaton (AUS)	+6:44.7
54	Greta Laurent (ITA)	+6:57.7
55	Katja Višnar (SLO)	+7:33.5
56	Rosie Frankowski (USA)	+7:52.8
57	Cendrine Browne (CAN)	+7:55.2
58	Hannah Halvorsen (USA)	+8:24.3
59	Becca Rorabaugh (USA)	+8:44.1
60	Annika Richardson (CAN)	+9:03.8
61	Laura Leclair (CAN)	+9:41.4
62	Frédérique Vézina (CAN)	+9:48.8
63	Maya MacIsaac-Jones (CAN)	+9:49.2
64	Sadie White (CAN)	+10:02.4
65	Alannah MacLean (CAN)	+10:12.0
66	Zoe Williams (CAN)	+10:29.8
67	Marie Corriveau (CAN)	+10:42.5
68	Alayna Sonnesyn (USA)	+11:02.2
69	Anne-Marie Petitclerc (CAN)	+11:09.5
70	Casey Wright (AUS)	+13:17.1

== Stages ==
=== Stage 1 ===
22 March 2019

- The skiers qualification times count in the overall standings. Bonus seconds are awarded to the 30 skiers that qualifies for the quarter-finals, distributed as following:
  - Final: 30–27–24–23–22–21
  - Semi-final: 16–15–14–13–12–11
  - Quarter-final: 5–5–5–4–4–4–4–4–3–3–3–3–3–2–2–2–2–2

Men – 1.6 km Sprint Freestyle (individual)
Rank	Name	QT	Time	BS
1	Johannes Høsflot Klæbo (NOR)	3:07.61 (1)	3:22.14	30
2	Federico Pellegrino (ITA)	3:09.97 (2)	+1.10	27
3	Sindre Bjørnestad Skar (NOR)	3:14.28 (9)	+1.55	24
4	Alexander Bolshunov (RUS)	3:10.26 (3)	+1.57	23
5	Johan Häggström (SWE)	3:18.13 (22)	+15.06	22
6	Lucas Chanavat (FRA)	3:14.06 (8)	+33.76	21
7	Andrey Melnichenko (RUS)	3:13.65 (6)		16
8	Viktor Thorn (SWE)	3:13.67 (7)		15
9	Ristomatti Hakola (FIN)	3:15.14 (10)		14
10	Alex Harvey (CAN)	3:18.69 (23)		13

Women – 1.6 km Sprint Freestyle (individual)
Rank	Name	QT	Time	BS
1	Stina Nilsson (SWE)	3:25.86 (2)	3:44.80	30
2	Maja Dahlqvist (SWE)	3:31.72 (8)	+0.01	27
3	Jonna Sundling (SWE)	3:25.39 (1)	+1.28	24
4	Maiken Caspersen Falla (NOR)	3:31.73 (9)	+10.01	23
5	Frida Karlsson (SWE)	3:32.44 (12)	+10.59	22
6	Sadie Bjornsen (USA)	3:30.63 (4)	+14.43	21
7	Sophie Caldwell (USA)	3:31.43 (7)		16
8	Ingvild Flugstad Østberg (NOR)	3:29.51 (3)		15
9	Astrid Uhrenholdt Jacobsen (NOR)	3:32.25 (11)		14
10	Jessie Diggins (USA)	3:33.60 (15)		13

=== Stage 2 ===
23 March 2019
Bonus seconds:

- Men: 2 intermediate sprints, bonus seconds to the 10 first skiers (15–12–10–8–6–5–4–3–2–1) past the intermediate points.
- Women: 1 intermediate sprint, bonus seconds to the 10 first skiers (15–12–10–8–6–5–4–3–2–1) past the intermediate point.
- Bonus seconds in finish: 15–10–5 to the 3 first skiers crossing the finish line.

Men – 15 km Classical (mass start)
Rank	Name	Time	BS
1	Johannes Høsflot Klæbo (NOR)	36:10.9	45
2	Alex Harvey (CAN)	+0.8	21
3	Didrik Tønseth (NOR)	+1.3	13
4	Francesco De Fabiani (ITA)	+1.6	7
5	Sjur Røthe (NOR)	+2.5	1
6	Emil Iversen (NOR)	+17.0	24
7	Alexander Bolshunov (RUS)	+17.4	20
8	Dario Cologna (SUI)	+17.6	6
9	Simen Hegstad Krüger (NOR)	+17.7	4
10	Ristomatti Hakola (FIN)	+18.2	

Women – 10 km Classical (mass start)
Rank	Name	Time	BS
1	Stina Nilsson (SWE)	25:51.6	30
2	Therese Johaug (NOR)	+0.2	20
3	Ingvild Flugstad Østberg (NOR)	+1.5	17
4	Ebba Andersson (SWE)	+25.4	
5	Krista Pärmäkoski (FIN)	+26.8	3
6	Maja Dahlqvist (SWE)	+39.6	8
7	Anastasia Sedova (RUS)	+42.5	
8	Astrid Uhrenholdt Jacobsen (NOR)	+43.2	1
9	Jonna Sundling (SWE)	+43.5	
10	Katharina Hennig (GER)	+43.5	2

=== Stage 3 ===
24 March 2019

- The race for "Winner of the Day" counts for 2018–19 FIS Cross-Country World Cup points. No bonus seconds are awarded on this stage.

Men – 15 km Freestyle (pursuit)
Rank	Name	Time
1	Alex Harvey (CAN)	28:15.4
2	Alexander Bolshunov (RUS)	+0.9
3	Simeon Hamilton (USA)	+33.5
4	Andrew Young (GBR)	+33.6
5	Simen Hegstad Krüger (NOR)	+37.1
6	Francesco De Fabiani (ITA)	+37.9
7	Maurice Manificat (FRA)	+38.4
8	Sjur Røthe (NOR)	+41.3
9	Andrey Melnichenko (RUS)	+43.8
10	Emil Iversen (NOR)	+47.8

Women – 10 km Freestyle (pursuit)
Rank	Name	Time
1	Therese Johaug (NOR)	23:18.6
2	Krista Pärmäkoski (FIN)	+3.9
3	Ebba Andersson (SWE)	+6.0
4	Jessie Diggins (USA)	+11.3
5	Ingvild Flugstad Østberg (NOR)	+18.4
6	Natalya Nepryayeva (RUS)	+19.2
7	Charlotte Kalla (SWE)	+24.9
7	Ida Ingemarsdotter (SWE)	+24.9
9	Maiken Caspersen Falla (NOR)	+30.0
10	Astrid Uhrenholdt Jacobsen (NOR)	+31.1

== World Cup points distribution ==
The overall winners are awarded 200 points. The winners of each of the three stages are awarded 50 points. The maximum number of points an athlete can earn is therefore 350 points.

Position	1	2	3	4	5	6	7	8	9	10	11	12	13	14	15	16	17	18	19	20	21	22	23	24	25	26	27	28	29	30
Overall	200	160	120	100	90	80	72	64	58	52	48	44	40	36	32	30	28	26	24	22	20	18	16	14	12	10	8	6	4	2
Stage	50	46	43	40	37	34	32	30	28	26	24	22	20	18	16	15	14	13	12	11	10	9	8	7	6	5	4	3	2	1

== Sources ==
- Rules for the FIS Cross-Country World Cup (PDF). International Ski Federation (FIS). 2018.
