= Åsunden =

Åsunden or Asunden may refer to:

- Åsunden (Västergötland), a lake in Västergötland, Sweden
- Åsunden (Östergötland), a lake in Östergötland, Sweden
- Asunden, Gotland, an island in Slite archipelago, Sweden
