= 2018–19 FIS Cross-Country World Cup =

Cross-country skiing competition

Discipline	Men	Women
Overall	(Norway) Johannes Høsflot Klæbo	(Norway) Ingvild Flugstad Østberg
Distance	(Russia) Alexander Bolshunov	(Norway) Therese Johaug
Sprint	(Norway) Johannes Høsflot Klæbo	(Sweden) Stina Nilsson
U-23	(Norway) Johannes Høsflot Klæbo	(Sweden) Ebba Andersson
Bonus	(Norway) Johannes Høsflot Klæbo	(Norway) Ingvild Flugstad Østberg
Nations Cup	Norway	Norway
- Nations Cup Overall: Norway

Stage events
Nordic Opening	(Norway) Didrik Tønseth	(Norway) Therese Johaug
Tour de Ski	(Norway) Johannes Høsflot Klæbo	(Norway) Ingvild Flugstad Østberg
World Cup Final	(Norway) Johannes Høsflot Klæbo	(Sweden) Stina Nilsson

Competition
Locations	17 venues	17 venues
Individual	29 events	29 events
Relay/Team	4 events	4 events

The 2018–19 FIS Cross-Country World Cup was the 38th official World Cup season in cross-country skiing for men and women. The season began on 24 November 2018 in Ruka, Finland and concluded with the World Cup Final on 24 March 2019 in Quebec City, Canada.

The biennial World Championships in Seefeld, Austria interrupted the World Cup in mid-February.

== Calendar ==
=== Men ===
WC	Stage	Date	Place	Discipline	Winner	Second	Third	Yellow bib	Ref.
1	1	24 November 2018	(Finland) Ruka	Sprint C	(Russia) Alexander Bolshunov	(Norway) Johannes Høsflot Klæbo	(Norway) Eirik Brandsdal	(Russia) Alexander Bolshunov	
2	2	25 November 2018	(Finland) Ruka	15 km C	(Russia) Alexander Bolshunov	(Norway) Emil Iversen	(Sweden) Calle Halfvarsson	(Russia) Alexander Bolshunov	
	3	30 November 2018	(Norway) Lillehammer	Sprint F	(Italy) Federico Pellegrino	(Norway) Emil Iversen	(Canada) Alex Harvey	(Russia) Alexander Bolshunov	
	4	1 December 2018	(Norway) Lillehammer	15 km F	(Norway) Sjur Røthe	(Norway) Didrik Tønseth	(Russia) Denis Spitsov	(Russia) Alexander Bolshunov	
	5	2 December 2018	(Norway) Lillehammer	15 km C Pursuit	(Germany) Janosch Brugger	(France) Jean-Marc Gaillard	(United States) Erik Bjornsen	(Russia) Alexander Bolshunov	
3	9th Nordic Opening Overall (30 November – 2 December 2018)				(Norway) Didrik Tønseth	(Norway) Sjur Røthe	(Norway) Emil Iversen	(Norway) Emil Iversen	
4	6	8 December 2018	(Norway) Beitostølen	30 km F	(Norway) Sjur Røthe	(Norway) Martin Johnsrud Sundby	(Russia) Andrey Melnichenko	(Russia) Alexander Bolshunov	
5	7	15 December 2018	(Switzerland) Davos	Sprint F	(Norway) Johannes Høsflot Klæbo	(Italy) Federico Pellegrino	(France) Baptiste Gros	(Russia) Alexander Bolshunov	
6	8	16 December 2018	(Switzerland) Davos	15 km F	(Russia) Evgeniy Belov	(France) Maurice Manificat	(Norway) Martin Johnsrud Sundby	(Russia) Alexander Bolshunov	
	9	29 December 2018	(Italy) Toblach	Sprint F	(Norway) Johannes Høsflot Klæbo	(France) Richard Jouve	(France) Lucas Chanavat	(Russia) Alexander Bolshunov	
	10	30 December 2018	(Italy) Toblach	15 km F	(Russia) Sergey Ustiugov	(Norway) Simen Hegstad Krüger	(Russia) Alexander Bolshunov	(Russia) Alexander Bolshunov	
	11	1 January 2019	(Switzerland) Val Müstair	Sprint F	(Norway) Johannes Høsflot Klæbo	(Italy) Federico Pellegrino	(Russia) Sergey Ustiugov	(Russia) Alexander Bolshunov	
	12	2 January 2019	(Germany) Oberstdorf	15 km C Mass Start	(Norway) Emil Iversen	(Italy) Francesco De Fabiani	(Russia) Sergey Ustiugov	(Russia) Alexander Bolshunov	
	13	3 January 2019	(Germany) Oberstdorf	15 km F Pursuit	(Norway) Johannes Høsflot Klæbo	(Russia) Sergey Ustiugov	(Russia) Alexander Bolshunov	(Russia) Alexander Bolshunov	
	14	5 January 2019	(Italy) Val di Fiemme	15 km C Mass Start	(Norway) Johannes Høsflot Klæbo	(Italy) Francesco De Fabiani	(Russia) Alexander Bolshunov	(Russia) Alexander Bolshunov	
	15	6 January 2019	(Italy) Val di Fiemme	9 km F Pursuit climb	(Norway) Sjur Røthe	(Norway) Simen Hegstad Krüger	(Russia) Andrey Melnichenko	(Russia) Alexander Bolshunov	
7	13th Tour de Ski Overall (29 December 2018 – 6 January 2019)				(Norway) Johannes Høsflot Klæbo	(Russia) Sergey Ustiugov	(Norway) Simen Hegstad Krüger	(Norway) Johannes Høsflot Klæbo	
8	16	12 January 2019	(Germany) Dresden	Sprint F	(Norway) Sindre Bjørnestad Skar	(Russia) Gleb Retivykh	(Norway) Erik Valnes	(Norway) Johannes Høsflot Klæbo	
9	17	19 January 2019	(Estonia) Otepää	Sprint C	(Norway) Johannes Høsflot Klæbo	(Russia) Alexander Bolshunov	(Norway) Pål Golberg	(Norway) Johannes Høsflot Klæbo	
10	18	20 January 2019	(Estonia) Otepää	15 km C	(Finland) Iivo Niskanen	(Russia) Alexander Bolshunov	(Norway) Didrik Tønseth	(Norway) Johannes Høsflot Klæbo	
11	19	26 January 2019	(Sweden) Ulricehamn	15 km F	(France) Maurice Manificat	(Norway) Simen Hegstad Krüger	(Norway) Didrik Tønseth	(Norway) Johannes Høsflot Klæbo	
12	20	9 February 2019	(Finland) Lahti	Sprint F	(Norway) Johannes Høsflot Klæbo	(Italy) Federico Pellegrino	(Norway) Finn Hågen Krogh	(Norway) Johannes Høsflot Klæbo	
13	21	16 February 2019	(Italy) Cogne	Sprint F	(Italy) Federico Pellegrino	(Italy) Francesco De Fabiani	(France) Lucas Chanavat	(Norway) Johannes Høsflot Klæbo	
14	22	17 February 2019	(Italy) Cogne	15 km C	(Russia) Alexander Bolshunov	(Finland) Iivo Niskanen	(Russia) Alexander Bessmertnykh	(Norway) Johannes Høsflot Klæbo	
FIS Nordic World Ski Championships 2019 (20 February–3 March)
15	23	9 March 2019	(Norway) Oslo	50 km C Mass Start	(Russia) Alexander Bolshunov	(Russia) Maxim Vylegzhanin	(Russia) Andrey Larkov	(Russia) Alexander Bolshunov	
16	24	12 March 2019	(Norway) Drammen	Sprint C	(Norway) Johannes Høsflot Klæbo	(Norway) Eirik Brandsdal	(France) Richard Jouve	(Norway) Johannes Høsflot Klæbo	
17	25	16 March 2019	(Sweden) Falun	Sprint F	(Norway) Johannes Høsflot Klæbo	(Norway) Emil Iversen	(Norway) Sindre Bjørnestad Skar	(Norway) Johannes Høsflot Klæbo	
18	26	17 March 2019	(Sweden) Falun	15 km F	(Russia) Alexander Bolshunov	(Norway) Martin Johnsrud Sundby	(Norway) Didrik Tønseth	(Norway) Johannes Høsflot Klæbo	
	27	22 March 2019	(Canada) Quebec City	Sprint F	(Norway) Johannes Høsflot Klæbo	(Italy) Federico Pellegrino	(Norway) Sindre Bjørnestad Skar	(Norway) Johannes Høsflot Klæbo	
	28	23 March 2019	(Canada) Quebec City	15 km C Mass Start	(Norway) Johannes Høsflot Klæbo	(Canada) Alex Harvey	(Norway) Didrik Tønseth	(Norway) Johannes Høsflot Klæbo	
	29	24 March 2019	(Canada) Quebec City	15 km F Pursuit	(Canada) Alex Harvey	(Russia) Alexander Bolshunov	(United Kingdom) Andrew Young	(Norway) Johannes Høsflot Klæbo	
19	2018–19 World Cup Finals (22–24 March 2019)				(Norway) Johannes Høsflot Klæbo	(Canada) Alex Harvey	(Russia) Alexander Bolshunov	(Norway) Johannes Høsflot Klæbo	

=== Women ===
WC	Stage	Date	Place	Discipline	Winner	Second	Third	Yellow bib	Ref.
1	1	24 November 2018	(Finland) Ruka	Sprint C	(Russia) Yuliya Belorukova	(Sweden) Maja Dahlqvist	(Sweden) Ida Ingemarsdotter	(Russia) Yulia Belorukova	
2	2	25 November 2018	(Finland) Ruka	10 km C	(Norway) Therese Johaug	(Sweden) Charlotte Kalla	(Sweden) Ebba Andersson	(Russia) Yulia Belorukova	
	3	30 November 2018	(Norway) Lillehammer	Sprint F	(Sweden) Jonna Sundling	(Sweden) Stina Nilsson	(United States) Sadie Bjornsen	(Russia) Yuliya Belorukova	
	4	1 December 2018	(Norway) Lillehammer	10 km F	(Norway) Therese Johaug	(Sweden) Ebba Andersson	(Sweden) Charlotte Kalla	(Russia) Yuliya Belorukova	
	5	2 December 2018	(Norway) Lillehammer	10 km C Pursuit	(Norway) Therese Johaug	(Norway) Ingvild Flugstad Østberg	(Sweden) Ebba Andersson	(Norway) Therese Johaug	
3	9th Nordic Opening Overall (30 November – 2 December 2018)				(Norway) Therese Johaug	(Sweden) Ebba Andersson	(Norway) Ingvild Flugstad Østberg	(Norway) Therese Johaug	
4	6	8 December 2018	(Norway) Beitostølen	15 km F	(Norway) Therese Johaug	(Sweden) Charlotte Kalla	(Norway) Ingvild Flugstad Østberg	(Norway) Therese Johaug	
5	7	15 December 2018	(Switzerland) Davos	Sprint F	(Sweden) Stina Nilsson	(United States) Sophie Caldwell	(Sweden) Maja Dahlqvist	(Norway) Therese Johaug	
6	8	16 December 2018	(Switzerland) Davos	10 km F	(Norway) Therese Johaug	(Norway) Ingvild Flugstad Østberg	(Finland) Krista Pärmäkoski	(Norway) Therese Johaug	
	9	29 December 2018	(Italy) Toblach	Sprint F	(Sweden) Stina Nilsson	(Sweden) Ida Ingemarsdotter	(United States) Jessie Diggins	(Norway) Therese Johaug	
	10	30 December 2018	(Italy) Toblach	10 km F	(Russia) Natalya Nepryayeva	(Norway) Ingvild Flugstad Østberg	(Russia) Anastasia Sedova	(Norway) Therese Johaug	
	11	1 January 2019	(Switzerland) Val Müstair	Sprint F	(Sweden) Stina Nilsson	(United States) Sophie Caldwell	(United States) Jessie Diggins	(Norway) Therese Johaug	
	12	2 January 2019	(Germany) Oberstdorf	10 km C Mass Start	(Norway) Ingvild Flugstad Østberg	(Russia) Natalya Nepryayeva	(Russia) Anastasia Sedova	(Norway) Ingvild Flugstad Østberg	
	13	3 January 2019	(Germany) Oberstdorf	10 km F Pursuit	(Norway) Ingvild Flugstad Østberg	(Russia) Natalya Nepryayeva	(United States) Jessie Diggins	(Norway) Ingvild Flugstad Østberg	
	14	5 January 2019	(Italy) Val di Fiemme	10 km C Mass Start	(Norway) Ingvild Flugstad Østberg	(Russia) Natalya Nepryayeva	(Russia) Anastasia Sedova	(Norway) Ingvild Flugstad Østberg	
	15	6 January 2019	(Italy) Val di Fiemme	9 km F Pursuit climb	(Norway) Ingvild Flugstad Østberg	(Finland) Krista Pärmäkoski	(Russia) Anastasia Sedova	(Norway) Ingvild Flugstad Østberg	
7	13th Tour de Ski Overall (29 December 2018 – 6 January 2019)				(Norway) Ingvild Flugstad Østberg	(Russia) Natalya Nepryayeva	(Finland) Krista Pärmäkoski	(Norway) Ingvild Flugstad Østberg	
8	16	12 January 2019	(Germany) Dresden	Sprint F	(Sweden) Stina Nilsson	(Sweden) Maja Dahlqvist	(Sweden) Jonna Sundling	(Norway) Ingvild Flugstad Østberg	
9	17	19 January 2019	(Estonia) Otepää	Sprint C	(Norway) Maiken Caspersen Falla	(Russia) Natalya Nepryayeva	(Sweden) Maja Dahlqvist	(Norway) Ingvild Flugstad Østberg	
10	18	20 January 2019	(Estonia) Otepää	10 km C	(Norway) Therese Johaug	(Sweden) Ebba Andersson	(Russia) Natalya Nepryayeva	(Norway) Ingvild Flugstad Østberg	
11	19	26 January 2019	(Sweden) Ulricehamn	10 km F	(Norway) Therese Johaug	(Norway) Astrid Uhrenholdt Jacobsen	(Sweden) Ebba Andersson	(Norway) Ingvild Flugstad Østberg	
12	20	9 February 2019	(Finland) Lahti	Sprint F	(Norway) Maiken Caspersen Falla	(United States) Sophie Caldwell	(Sweden) Maja Dahlqvist	(Norway) Ingvild Flugstad Østberg	
13	21	16 February 2019	(Italy) Cogne	Sprint F	(United States) Jessie Diggins	(Germany) Sandra Ringwald	(Sweden) Johanna Hagström	(Norway) Ingvild Flugstad Østberg	
14	22	17 February 2019	(Italy) Cogne	10 km C	(Finland) Kerttu Niskanen	(Switzerland) Nadine Fähndrich	(Russia) Natalya Nepryayeva	(Norway) Ingvild Flugstad Østberg	
FIS Nordic World Ski Championships 2019 (20 February–3 March)
15	23	10 March 2019	(Norway) Oslo	30 km C Mass Start	(Norway) Therese Johaug	(Russia) Natalya Nepryayeva	(Sweden) Ebba Andersson	(Norway) Ingvild Flugstad Østberg	
16	24	12 March 2019	(Norway) Drammen	Sprint C	(Norway) Maiken Caspersen Falla	(Norway) Astrid Uhrenholdt Jacobsen	(Russia) Natalya Nepryayeva	(Norway) Ingvild Flugstad Østberg	
17	25	16 March 2019	(Sweden) Falun	Sprint F	(Sweden) Stina Nilsson	(Norway) Maiken Caspersen Falla	(Sweden) Maja Dahlqvist	(Norway) Ingvild Flugstad Østberg	
18	26	17 March 2019	(Sweden) Falun	10 km F	(Norway) Therese Johaug	(Sweden) Ebba Andersson	(United States) Jessie Diggins	(Norway) Ingvild Flugstad Østberg	
	27	22 March 2019	(Canada) Quebec City	Sprint F	(Sweden) Stina Nilsson	(Sweden) Maja Dahlqvist	(Sweden) Jonna Sundling	(Norway) Ingvild Flugstad Østberg	
	28	23 March 2019	(Canada) Quebec City	10 km C Mass Start	(Sweden) Stina Nilsson	(Norway) Therese Johaug	(Norway) Ingvild Flugstad Østberg	(Norway) Ingvild Flugstad Østberg	
	29	24 March 2019	(Canada) Quebec City	10 km F Pursuit	(Norway) Therese Johaug	(Finland) Krista Pärmäkoski	(Sweden) Ebba Andersson	(Norway) Ingvild Flugstad Østberg	
19	2018–19 World Cup Finals (22–24 March 2019)				(Sweden) Stina Nilsson	(Norway) Therese Johaug	(Norway) Ingvild Flugstad Østberg	(Norway) Ingvild Flugstad Østberg	

=== Men's team ===
WC	Date	Place	Discipline	Winner	Second	Third	Ref.
1	9 December 2018	(Norway) Beitostølen	4 × 7.5 km relay C/F	Norway I Emil Iversen; Martin Johnsrud Sundby; Sjur Røthe; Finn Hågen Krogh	Russia I Evgeniy Belov; Alexander Bolshunov; Denis Spitsov; Andrey Melnichenko	Norway II Didrik Tønseth; Hans Christer Holund; Magne Haga; Simen Hegstad Krüger	
2	13 January 2019	(Germany) Dresden	Team Sprint F	Norway I Erik Valnes; Sindre Bjørnestad Skar	Norway II Pål Golberg; Eirik Brandsdal	Russia I Artem Maltsev; Gleb Retivykh	
3	27 January 2019	(Sweden) Ulricehamn	4 × 7.5 km relay C/F	Russia II Evgeniy Belov; Alexander Bessmertnykh; Denis Spitsov; Artem Maltsev	Russia I Andrey Larkov; Alexander Bolshunov; Andrey Melnichenko; Sergey Ustiugov	Norway Hans Christer Holund; Didrik Tønseth; Sjur Røthe; Simen Hegstad Krüger	
4	10 February 2019	(Finland) Lahti	Team Sprint C	Norway I Emil Iversen; Johannes Høsflot Klæbo	Norway II Sindre Bjørnestad Skar; Eirik Brandsdal	Finland I Iivo Niskanen; Ristomatti Hakola	

=== Women's team ===
WC	Date	Place	Discipline	Winner	Second	Third	Ref.
1	9 December 2018	(Norway) Beitostølen	4 × 5 km relay C/F	Norway I Heidi Weng; Therese Johaug; Ragnhild Haga; Ingvild Flugstad Østberg	Russia II Lidia Durkina; Anna Zherebyatyeva; Mariya Istomina; Elena Soboleva	Finland I Johanna Matintalo; Krista Pärmäkoski; Riitta-Liisa Roponen; Eveliina Piippo	
2	13 January 2019	(Germany) Dresden	Team Sprint F	Sweden I Stina Nilsson; Maja Dahlqvist	Sweden II Ida Ingemarsdotter; Jonna Sundling	Norway I Mari Eide; Maiken Caspersen Falla	
3	27 January 2019	(Sweden) Ulricehamn	4 × 5 km relay C/F	Norway I Heidi Weng; Therese Johaug; Astrid Uhrenholdt Jacobsen; Ingvild Flugstad Østberg	Sweden I Evelina Settlin; Ebba Andersson; Charlotte Kalla; Jonna Sundling	Finland Laura Mononen; Krista Pärmäkoski; Riitta-Liisa Roponen; Eveliina Piippo	
4	10 February 2019	(Finland) Lahti	Team Sprint C	Sweden I Ida Ingemarsdotter; Maja Dahlqvist	Norway I Tiril Udnes Weng; Maiken Caspersen Falla	Sweden II Evelina Settlin; Hanna Falk	

== Men's standings ==
=== Overall ===
Rank	after all 32 events	Points
	(Norway) Johannes Høsflot Klæbo	1715
2	(Russia) Alexander Bolshunov	1617
3	(Norway) Sjur Røthe	974
4	(Norway) Simen Hegstad Krüger	907
5	(Norway) Didrik Tønseth	867
6	(Norway) Emil Iversen	825
7	(Italy) Francesco De Fabiani	815
8	(Italy) Federico Pellegrino	706
9	(Norway) Martin Johnsrud Sundby	689
10	(Russia) Sergey Ustiugov	633

=== Distance ===
Rank	after all 17 events	Points
	(Russia) Alexander Bolshunov	864
2	(Norway) Sjur Røthe	558
3	(Norway) Martin Johnsrud Sundby	513
4	(Norway) Simen Hegstad Krüger	495
5	(Norway) Didrik Tønseth	486
6	(Italy) Francesco De Fabiani	369
7	(Russia) Andrey Larkov	365
8	(Russia) Andrey Melnichenko	331
9	(Norway) Johannes Høsflot Klæbo	325
10	(Norway) Emil Iversen	316

=== Sprint ===
Rank	after all 12 events	Points
	(Norway) Johannes Høsflot Klæbo	754
2	(Italy) Federico Pellegrino	555
3	(Norway) Eirik Brandsdal	471
4	(Norway) Sindre Bjørnestad Skar	444
5	(Russia) Alexander Bolshunov	363
6	(France) Lucas Chanavat	352
7	(Russia) Gleb Retivykh	329
8	(Norway) Emil Iversen	299
9	(France) Richard Jouve	284
10	(Norway) Sondre Turvoll Fossli	204

=== Prize money ===
Rank	after all 44 payouts	CHF
1	(Norway) Johannes Høsflot Klæbo	207.500
2	(Russia) Alexander Bolshunov	139.625
3	(Norway) Sjur Røthe	85.875
4	(Norway) Simen Hegstad Krüger	61.050
5	(Norway) Emil Iversen	59.675
6	(Norway) Didrik Tønseth	58.775
7	(Russia) Sergey Ustiugov	55.800
8	(Italy) Federico Pellegrino	46.600
9	(Norway) Martin Johnsrud Sundby	42.000
10	(Canada) Alex Harvey	35.550

=== Helvetia U23 ===
Rank	after all 32 events	Points
	(Norway) Johannes Høsflot Klæbo	1715
2	(Russia) Alexander Bolshunov	1617
3	(Russia) Denis Spitsov	428
4	(Sweden) Viktor Thorn	428
5	(France) Jules Lapierre	198
6	(Norway) Erik Valnes	177
7	(Russia) Andrey Sobakarev	122
8	(Andorra) Irineu Esteve Altimiras	108
9	(Russia) Ivan Yakimushkin	103
10	(Germany) Janosch Brugger	93

=== Audi e-tron Bonus Ranking ===
Rank	after all 10 events	Points
	(Norway) Johannes Høsflot Klæbo	326
2	(Russia) Alexander Bolshunov	228
3	(Norway) Emil Iversen	218
4	(Italy) Federico Pellegrino	148
5	(Norway) Sindre Bjørnestad Skar	145
6	(France) Richard Jouve	104
7	(France) Lucas Chanavat	104
8	(Russia) Sergey Ustiugov	96
9	(Norway) Simen Hegstad Krüger	74
10	(Italy) Francesco De Fabiani	70

== Women's standings ==
=== Overall ===
Rank	after all 32 events	Points
	(Norway) Ingvild Flugstad Østberg	1654
2	(Russia) Natalya Nepryayeva	1431
3	(Norway) Therese Johaug	1322
4	(Finland) Krista Pärmäkoski	1316
5	(Sweden) Stina Nilsson	1072
6	(United States) Jessie Diggins	1005
7	(Sweden) Ebba Andersson	918
8	(Russia) Yuliya Belorukova	853
9	(Sweden) Maja Dahlqvist	672
10	(Norway) Maiken Caspersen Falla	656

=== Distance ===
Rank	after all 17 events	Points
	(Norway) Therese Johaug	956
2	(Norway) Ingvild Flugstad Østberg	817
3	(Russia) Natalya Nepryayeva	692
4	(Finland) Krista Pärmäkoski	687
5	(Sweden) Ebba Andersson	646
6	(United States) Jessie Diggins	468
7	(Sweden) Charlotte Kalla	454
8	(Russia) Yuliya Belorukova	385
9	(Russia) Anastasia Sedova	377
10	(Norway) Astrid Uhrenholdt Jacobsen	352

=== Sprint ===
Rank	after all 12 events	Points
	(Sweden) Stina Nilsson	626
2	(Norway) Maiken Caspersen Falla	583
3	(Sweden) Maja Dahlqvist	482
4	(United States) Sophie Caldwell	371
5	(Russia) Natalya Nepryayeva	311
6	(Sweden) Ida Ingemarsdotter	306
7	(United States) Jessie Diggins	301
8	(United States) Sadie Bjornsen	263
9	(Sweden) Jonna Sundling	260
10	(Switzerland) Nadine Fähndrich	245

=== Prize money ===
Rank	after all 44 payouts	CHF
1	(Norway) Ingvild Flugstad Østberg	175.900
2	(Norway) Therese Johaug	146.375
3	(Russia) Natalya Nepryayeva	119.325
4	(Sweden) Stina Nilsson	97.575
5	(Finland) Krista Pärmäkoski	83.900
6	(Sweden) Ebba Andersson	71.500
7	(Sweden) Maja Dahlqvist	55.300
8	(United States) Jessie Diggins	54.525
9	(Norway) Maiken Caspersen Falla	50.050
10	(Russia) Yuliya Belorukova	40.950

=== Helvetia U23 ===
Rank	after all 32 events	Points
	(Sweden) Ebba Andersson	918
2	(Norway) Tiril Udnes Weng	406
3	(Russia) Mariya Istomina	268
4	(Germany) Katharina Hennig	250
5	(Norway) Lotta Udnes Weng	181
6	(Russia) Lidia Durkina	175
7	(Sweden) Frida Karlsson	169
8	(Sweden) Johanna Hagström	107
9	(Sweden) Moa Lundgren	103
10	(Russia) Anna Zherebyateva	56

=== Audi e-tron Bonus Ranking ===
Rank	after all 10 events	Points
	(Norway) Ingvild Flugstad Østberg	213
2	(Sweden) Stina Nilsson	207
3	(Russia) Natalya Nepryayeva	161
4	(United States) Jessie Diggins	123
5	(Norway) Maiken Caspersen Falla	99
6	(United States) Sophie Caldwell	98
7	(United States) Sadie Bjornsen	97
8	(Sweden) Ida Ingemarsdotter	94
9	(Russia) Yuliya Belorukova	94
10	(Finland) Krista Pärmäkoski	84

== Nations Cup ==
=== Overall ===
Rank	after all 72 events	Points
1	Norway	12657
2	Russia	8636
3	Sweden	7015
4	Finland	3510
5	United States	3065
6	France	2483
7	Italy	2463
8	Germany	2220
9	Switzerland	1839
10	Slovenia	1165

=== Men ===
Rank	after all 36 events	Points
1	Norway	6740
2	Russia	4929
3	France	2292
4	Sweden	2100
5	Italy	1864
6	Finland	1216
7	Switzerland	982
8	Germany	845
9	Canada	642
10	Great Britain	584

=== Women ===
Rank	after all 36 events	Points
1	Norway	5917
2	Sweden	4915
3	Russia	3707
4	United States	2501
5	Finland	2294
6	Germany	1375
7	Slovenia	1007
8	Switzerland	857
9	Italy	599
10	Japan	361

== Points distribution ==
The table shows the number of points won in the 2018/19 Cross-Country Skiing World Cup for men and ladies.

Place	1	2	3	4	5	6	7	8	9	10	11	12	13	14	15	16	17	18	19	20	21	22	23	24	25	26	27	28	29	30
Individual	100	80	60	50	45	40	36	32	29	26	24	22	20	18	16	15	14	13	12	11	10	9	8	7	6	5	4	3	2	1
Team Sprint	100	80	60	50	45	40	36	32	29	26	24	22	20	18	16	15	14	13	12	11	10	9	8	7	6	5	4	3	2	1
Nordic Opening	200	160	120	100	90	80	72	64	58	52	48	44	40	36	32	30	28	26	24	22	20	18	16	14	12	10	8	6	4	2
World Cup Final	200	160	120	100	90	80	72	64	58	52	48	44	40	36	32	30	28	26	24	22	20	18	16	14	12	10	8	6	4	2
Relay	200	160	120	100	90	80	72	64	58	52	48	44	40	36	32	30	28	26	24	22	20	18	16	14	12	10	8	6	4	2
Tour de Ski	400	320	240	200	180	160	144	128	116	104	96	88	80	72	64	60	56	52	48	44	40	36	32	28	24	20	16	12	8	4
Stage Nordic Opening	50	46	43	40	37	34	32	30	28	26	24	22	20	18	16	15	14	13	12	11	10	9	8	7	6	5	4	3	2	1
Stage Tour de Ski	50	46	43	40	37	34	32	30	28	26	24	22	20	18	16	15	14	13	12	11	10	9	8	7	6	5	4	3	2	1
Stage World Cup Final	50	46	43	40	37	34	32	30	28	26	24	22	20	18	16	15	14	13	12	11	10	9	8	7	6	5	4	3	2	1
Bonus points	15	12	10	8	6	5	4	3	2	1

== Achievements ==
Only individual events.

First World Cup career victory

Men

- (Germany) Janosch Brugger, 21, in his 3rd season – the WC 3 (15 km C Pursuit) in Lillehammer; also first podium
- (Russia) Evgeniy Belov, 28, in his 9th season – the WC 6 (15 km F) in Davos; first podium was 2013-14 WC 17 (15 km C Mass Start) in Szklarska Poręba

Women

- (Russia) Yuliya Belorukova, 23, in her 5th season – the WC 1 (Sprint C) in Ruka; first podium was 2017–18 WC 1 (Sprint C) in Ruka
- (Sweden) Jonna Sundling, 23, in her 5th season – the WC 3 (Sprint F) in Lillehammer; first podium was 2017–18 WC 18 (Sprint F) in Falun
- (Russia) Natalya Nepryayeva, 23, in her 6th season – the WC 7 (10 km F) in Toblach; first podium was 2017–18 WC 15 (10 km C) in Lahti

First World Cup podium

Men

- (Germany) Janosch Brugger, 21, in his 3rd season - no. 1 in the WC 3 (15 km C Pursuit) in Lillehammer
- (United States) Erik Bjornsen, 27, in his 7th season - no. 3 in the WC 3 (15 km C Pursuit) in Lillehammer
- (Russia) Andrey Melnichenko, 26, in his 4th season - no. 3 in the WC 4 (30 km F) in Beitostølen
- (Norway) Erik Valnes, 22, in his 2nd season - no. 3 in the WC 8 (Sprint F) in Dresden

Women

- (Sweden) Ebba Andersson, 21, in her 3rd season - no. 3 in the WC 2 (10 km C) in Ruka
- (Russia) Anastasia Sedova, 23, in her 3rd season - no. 3 in the WC 7 (10 km F) in Toblach
- (Germany) Sandra Ringwald, 28, in her 9th season - no. 2 in the WC 13 (Sprint F) in Cogne
- (Sweden) Johanna Hagström, 20, in her 3rd season - no. 3 in the WC 13 (Sprint F) in Cogne
- (Switzerland) Nadine Fähndrich, 23, in her 4th season - no. 2 in the WC 14 (10 km C) in Cogne

Victories in this World Cup (all-time number of victories in parentheses)

Men

- (Norway) Johannes Høsflot Klæbo, 13 (27) first places
- (Russia) Alexander Bolshunov, 5 (8) first places
- (Norway) Sjur Røthe, 3 (4) first places
- (Italy) Federico Pellegrino, 2 (13) first places
- (Russia) Sergey Ustiugov, 1 (13) first place
- (France) Maurice Manificat, 1 (10) first place
- (Canada) Alex Harvey, 1 (8) first place
- (Norway) Emil Iversen, 1 (6) first place
- (Norway) Didrik Tønseth, 1 (3) first place
- (Finland) Iivo Niskanen, 1 (3) first place
- (Norway) Sindre Bjørnestad Skar, 1 (2) first place
- (Russia) Evgeniy Belov, 1 (1) first place
- (Germany) Janosch Brugger, 1 (1) first place

Women

- (Norway) Therese Johaug, 11 (53) first places
- (Sweden) Stina Nilsson, 8 (23) first places
- (Norway) Ingvild Flugstad Østberg, 5 (16) first places
- (Norway) Maiken Caspersen Falla, 3 (19) first places
- (United States) Jessie Diggins, 1 (6) first place
- (Finland) Kerttu Niskanen, 1 (2) first place
- (Russia) Yuliya Belorukova, 1 (1) first place
- (Russia) Natalya Nepryayeva, 1 (1) first place
- (Sweden) Jonna Sundling, 1 (1) first place

== Retirements ==
The following athletes announced their retirements during or after the season:

Men

- (France) Robin Duvillard
- (Canada) Alex Harvey
- (Finland) Matti Heikkinen
- (Russia) Nikita Kryukov
- (Norway) Petter Northug
- (Austria) Luis Stadlober
- (Canada) Len Väljas
- (Russia) Maxim Vylegzhanin

Women

- (Germany) Stefanie Böhler
- (Germany) Nicole Fessel
- (France) Coraline Hugue
- (Sweden) Ida Ingemarsdotter
- (Germany) Sandra Ringwald
- (United States) Ida Sargent
- (Germany) Elisabeth Schicho
- (Switzerland) Nathalie von Siebenthal
