= Kristian Tettli Rennemo =

Norwegian cross-country skier

Personal information
- Nationality: Norway
- Born: November 1, 1984 (age 41) Trondheim, Norway

Sport
- Sport: Skiing
- Club: Leksvik IL

World Cup career
- Seasons: 6 – (2009–2014)
- Indiv. starts: 34
- Indiv. podiums: 0
- Team starts: 5
- Team podiums: 1
- Team wins: 1
- Overall titles: 0 – (64th in 2012)
- Discipline titles: 0

Kristian Tettli Rennemo (born November 1, 1984) is a Norwegian cross-country skier who competed from 2004 to 2015. His best FIS Cross-Country World Cup finish was a win in a 4 × 10 km relay event in Finland in March 2010 at the 2009–10 FIS Cross-Country World Cup.

== Cross-country skiing results ==
All results are sourced from the International Ski Federation (FIS).

=== World Cup ===
==== Season standings ====
Season	Age	Discipline standings			Ski Tour standings		
Season	Age	Overall	Distance	Sprint	Nordic Opening	Tour de Ski	World Cup Final
2009	24	NC	NC	—	—N/a	—	—
2010	25	85	63	NC	—N/a	—	22
2011	26	94	71	NC	DNF	26	—
2012	27	64	42	90	—	DNF	—
2013	28	NC	NC	—	—	—	—
2014	29	NC	NC	—	—	—	—

==== Team podiums ====
- 1 victory – (1 RL)
- 1 podium – (1 RL)

No.	Season	Date	Location	Race	Level	Place	Teammates
1	2009–10	7 March 2010	Lahti, Finland	4 × 10 km Relay C/F	World Cup	1st	Østensen / Djupvik / Røthe
