= Simen Østensen =

Norwegian cross-country skier

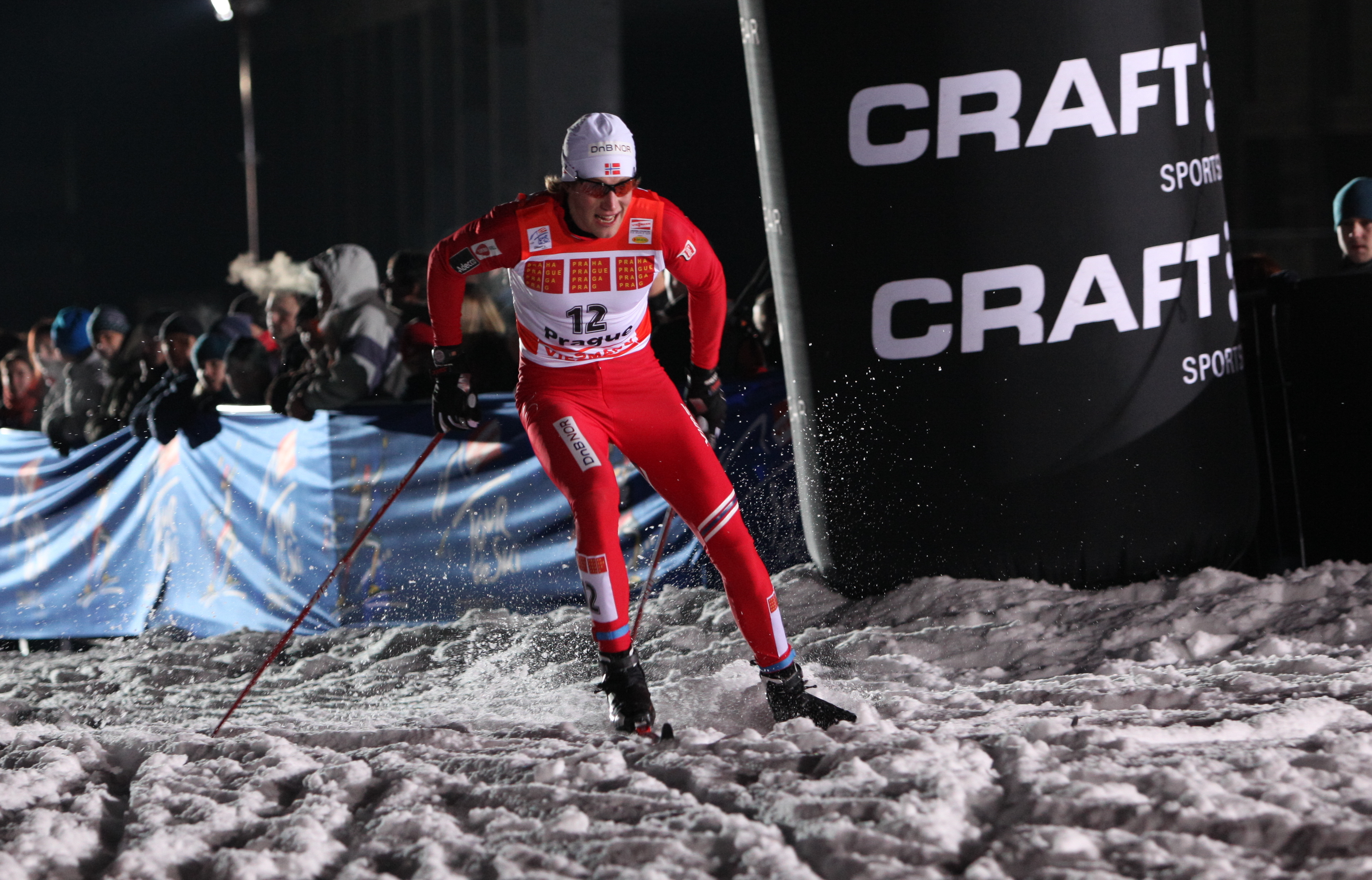
- Simen Østensen in 2010

Personal information
- Nationality: Norway
- Born: 4 August 1984 (age 41) Bærum, Norway

Sport
- Sport: Skiing
- Club: Fossum IF

World Cup career
- Seasons: 9 – (2005, 2007–2008, 2010–2015)
- Indiv. starts: 80
- Indiv. podiums: 3
- Indiv. wins: 0
- Team starts: 7
- Team podiums: 3
- Team wins: 2
- Overall titles: 0 – (11th in 2007)
- Discipline titles: 0

Simen Østensen (born 4 August 1984) is a Norwegian cross-country skier. He skis with the club Fossum IF.

He finished third in the 2006-07 Tour de Ski. Before that, Østensen had started in a World Cup race only once (the 50 km in Holmenkollen in 2005, where he did not finish) before.

Østensen won the test event in the team sprint at Liberec, Czech Republic on 17 February 2008.

== Cross-country skiing results ==
All results are sourced from the International Ski Federation (FIS).

=== World Championships ===
Year	Age	15 km individual	30 km skiathlon	50 km mass start	Sprint	4 × 10 km relay	Team sprint
2007	22	—	DNF	—	—	—	—

=== World Cup ===
==== Season standings ====
Season	Age	Discipline standings			Ski Tour standings		
Season	Age	Overall	Distance	Sprint	Nordic Opening	Tour de Ski	World Cup Final
2005	20	NC	NC	—	—N/a	—N/a	—N/a
2007	22	11	76	22	—N/a	3rd place, bronze medalist(s)	—N/a
2008	23	27	23	32	—N/a	28	15
2010	25	54	80	29	—N/a	25	—
2011	26	53	60	27	49	DNF	—
2012	27	143	89	NC	—	—	—
2013	28	NC	NC	NC	—	DNF	—
2014	29	80	49	—	—	—	—
2015	30	57	41	NC	16	DNF	—N/a

==== Individual podiums ====
- 3 podiums (1 WC, 2 SWC)

No.	Season	Date	Location	Race	Level	Place
1	2006–07	31 December 2006 – 7 January 2007	(Germany) (Italy) Tour de Ski	Overall Standings	World Cup	3rd
2	2007–08	31 December 2007	Prague, Czech Republic	1.0 km Sprint F	Stage World Cup	2nd
3	2009–10	4 January 2010	Prague, Czech Republic	1.2 km Sprint F	Stage World Cup	3rd

==== Team podiums ====
- 2 victories – (1 RL, 1 TS)
- 3 podiums – (2 RL, 1TS)

No.	Season	Date	Location	Race	Level	Place	Teammate(s)
1	2007–08	17 February 2008	Liberec, Czech Republic	6 × 1.4 km Team Sprint C	World Cup	1st	Sundby
2	2007–08	24 February 2008	Falun, Sweden	4 × 10 km Relay C/F	World Cup	2nd	Svartedal / Hjelmeset / Gjerdalen
3	2009–10	7 March 2010	Lahti, Finland	4 × 10 km Relay C/F	World Cup	1st	Djupvik / Røthe / Rennemo
