= Sjur Røthe =

Norwegian cross-country skier

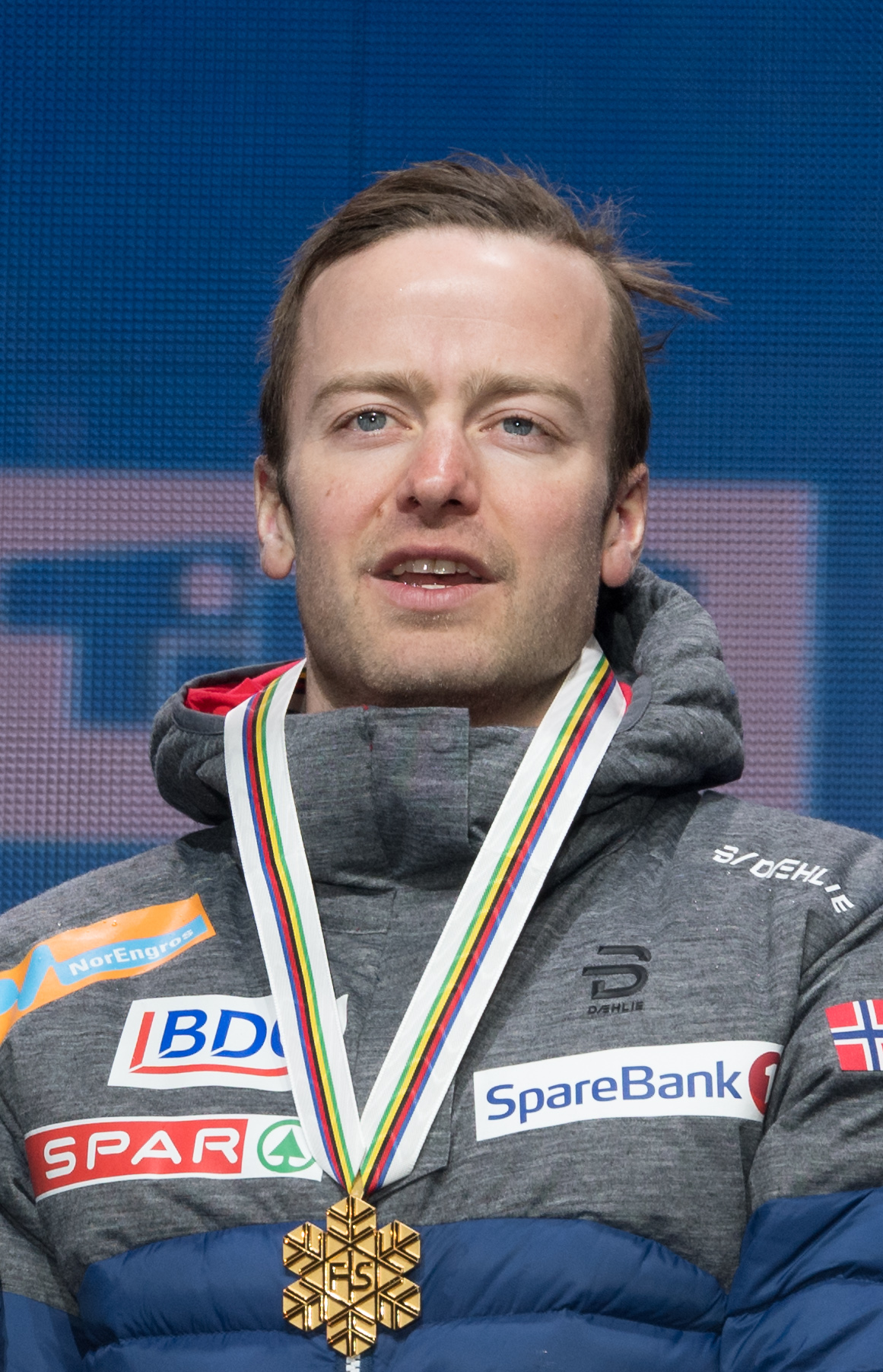
- Sjur Røthe in March 2019

Personal information
- Nationality: Norway
- Born: 2 July 1988 (age 38) Voss Municipality, Norway
- Height: 1.71 m (5 ft 7 in)

Sport
- Sport: Skiing
- Club: Voss IL

World Cup career
- Seasons: 15 – (2009–present)
- Indiv. starts: 196
- Indiv. podiums: 30
- Indiv. wins: 6
- Team starts: 18
- Team podiums: 14
- Team wins: 7
- Overall titles: 0 – (3rd in 2019)
- Discipline titles: 0
Medal record
Men's cross-country skiing
Representing Norway
World Championships
Gold medal – first place	2013 Val di Fiemme	4 × 10 km relay
Gold medal – first place	2019 Seefeld	30 km skiathlon
Gold medal – first place	2019 Seefeld	4 × 10 km relay
Bronze medal – third place	2013 Val di Fiemme	30 km skiathlon
Bronze medal – third place	2019 Seefeld	50 km freestyle
Bronze medal – third place	2023 Planica	30 km skiathlon
Junior World Championships
Silver medal – second place	2007 Tarvisio	20 km skiathlon
- Updated on 27 March 2023

Sjur Røthe (born 2 July 1988) is a Norwegian cross-country skier. He is a three-time World champion.

== Career ==
He made his World Cup debut in March 2009 in Trondheim, but did not finish the race, and collected his first World Cup points in November 2009 in Beitostølen, with an eighteenth place. A fifteenth place in a 4 × 10 km relay race followed.

He represents the sports club Voss IL, and lives in Oslo. He was diagnosed with Bekhterev's disease.

== Cross-country skiing results ==
All results are sourced from the International Ski Federation (FIS).

=== Olympic Games ===
Year	Age	15 km individual	30 km skiathlon	50 km mass start	Sprint	4 × 10 km relay	Team sprint
2014	25	—	19	—	—	—	—
2022	33	—	DNF	5^{[a]}	—	—	—

^{a} Distance reduced to 30 km due to weather conditions.

=== World Championships ===
- 6 medals – (3 gold, 3 bronze)

Year	Age	15 km individual	30 km skiathlon	50 km mass start	Sprint	4 × 10 km relay	Team sprint
2011	22	21	14	4	—	—	—
2013	24	5	Bronze	17	—	Gold	—
2015	26	9	DNF	—	—	—	—
2017	28	—	4	6	—	—	—
2019	30	7	Gold	Bronze	—	Gold	—
2021	32	6	6	—	—	—	—
2023	34	6	Bronze	DNS	—	—	—

=== World Cup ===
==== Season standings ====
Season	Age	Discipline standings			Ski Tour standings				
Season	Age	Overall	Distance	Sprint	Nordic Opening	Tour de Ski	Ski Tour 2020	World Cup Final	Ski Tour Canada
2009	20	NC	NC	—	—N/a	—	—N/a	—	—N/a
2010	21	124	79	—	—N/a	—	—N/a	—	—N/a
2011	22	73	41	NC	DNF	—	—N/a	—	—N/a
2012	23	30	25	78	19	26	—N/a	10	—N/a
2013	24	13	8	66	13	—	—N/a	17	—N/a
2014	25	7	6	NC	15	4	—N/a	8	—N/a
2015	26	13	11	76	3rd place, bronze medalist(s)	DNF	—N/a	—N/a	—N/a
2016	27	14	12	97	10	6	—N/a	—N/a	—
2017	28	9	6	NC	13	11	—N/a	7	—N/a
2018	29	28	12	NC	—	DNF	—N/a	8	—N/a
2019	30	3rd place, bronze medalist(s)	2nd place, silver medalist(s)	89	2nd place, silver medalist(s)	4	—N/a	10	—N/a
2020	31	5	2nd place, silver medalist(s)	43	8	4	9	—N/a	—N/a
2021	32	21	12	NC	16	—	—N/a	—N/a	—N/a
2022	33	13	6	NC	—N/a	11	—N/a	—N/a	—N/a
2023	34	19	9	NC	—N/a	7	—N/a	—N/a	—N/a

==== Individual podiums ====
- 6 victories – (2 WC, 4 SWC)
- 30 podiums – (18 WC, 12 SWC)

No.	Season	Date	Location	Race	Level	Place
1	2012–13	13 December 2012	Canmore, Canada	15 km Mass Start C	World Cup	2nd
2	2012–13	16 December 2012	Canmore, Canada	15 km + 15 km Skiathlon C/F	World Cup	3rd
3	2013–14	5 January 2014	Val di Fiemme, Italy	10 km Pursuit F	Stage World Cup	2nd
4	2014–15	6 December 2014	Lillehammer, Norway	10 km Individual F	Stage World Cup	3rd
5	2014–15	5–7 December 2014	(Norway) Nordic Opening	Overall Standings	World Cup	3rd
6	2014–15	13 December 2014	Davos, Switzerland	15 km Individual C	World Cup	3rd
7	2014–15	14 March 2015	Oslo, Norway	50 km Mass Start F	World Cup	1st
8	2015–16	29 November 2015	Rukatunturi, Finland	15 km Pursuit C	Stage World Cup	3rd
9	2015–16	20 December 2015	Toblach, Italy	15 km Individual C	World Cup	3rd
10	2016–17	3 March 2017	Oslo, Norway	50 km Mass Start C	World Cup	3rd
11	2016–17	19 March 2017	Quebec City, Canada	15 km Pursuit F	Stage World Cup	3rd
12	2018–19	1 December 2018	Lillehammer, Norway	15 km Individual F	Stage World Cup	1st
13	2018–19	30 November – 2 December 2018	(Norway) Nordic Opening	Overall Standings	World Cup	2nd
14	2018–19	8 December 2018	Beitostølen, Norway	30 km Individual F	World Cup	1st
15	2018–19	6 January 2019	Val di Fiemme, Italy	9 km Pursuit F	Stage World Cup	1st
16	2019–20	1 December 2019	Rukatunturi, Finland	15 km Pursuit F	Stage World Cup	2nd
17	2019–20	5 January 2020	Val di Fiemme, Italy	10 km Mass Start F	Stage World Cup	2nd
18	2019–20	18 January 2020	Nové Město, Czech Republic	15 km Individual F	World Cup	3rd
19	2019–20	25 January 2020	Oberstdorf, Germany	15 km + 15 km Skiathlon C/F	World Cup	3rd
20	2019–20	9 February 2020	Falun, Sweden	15 km Mass Start F	World Cup	2nd
21	2019–20	15 February 2020	Östersund, Sweden	15 km Individual F	Stage World Cup	1st
22	2020–21	29 November 2020	Rukatunturi, Finland	15 km Pursuit F	Stage World Cup	3rd
23	2020–21	23 January 2021	Lahti, Finland	15 km + 15 km Skiathlon C/F	World Cup	2nd
24	2020–21	29 January 2021	Falun, Sweden	15 km Individual F	World Cup	3rd
25	2021–22	31 December 2021	Oberstdorf, Germany	15 km Mass Start F	Stage World Cup	3rd
26	2021–22	4 January 2022	Val di Fiemme, Italy	10 km Mass Start F	Stage World Cup	1st
27	2021–22	6 March 2022	Oslo, Norway	50 km Mass Start C	World Cup	2nd
28	2022–23	4 December 2022	Lillehammer, Norway	20 km Mass Start C	World Cup	2nd
29	2022–23	18 December 2022	Davos, Switzerland	20 km Individual F	World Cup	3rd
30	2022–23	27 January 2023	Les Rousses, France	10 km Individual F	World Cup	2nd

==== Team podiums ====
- 7 victories – (7 RL)
- 14 podiums – (14 RL)

No.	Season	Date	Location	Race	Level	Place	Teammates
1	2009–10	7 March 2010	Lahti, Finland	4 × 10 km Relay C/F	World Cup	1st	Østensen / Djupvik / Rennemo
2	2010–11	21 November 2010	Gällivare, Sweden	4 × 10 km Relay C/F	World Cup	3rd	Rønning / Sundby / Jespersen
3	2011–12	20 November 2011	Sjusjøen, Norway	4 × 10 km Relay C/F	World Cup	2nd	Dahl / Ansnes / Eilifsen
4	2012–13	25 November 2012	Gällivare, Sweden	4 × 7.5 km Relay C/F	World Cup	1st	Rønning / Sundby / Northug
5	2012–13	20 January 2013	La Clusaz, France	4 × 7.5 km Relay C/F	World Cup	1st	Rønning / Tønseth / Sundby
6	2013–14	8 December 2013	Lillehammer, Norway	4 × 7.5 km Relay C/F	World Cup	2nd	Rønning / Jespersen / Krogh
7	2015–16	6 December 2015	Lillehammer, Norway	4 × 7.5 km Relay C/F	World Cup	3rd	Iversen / Tønseth / Gløersen
8	2015–16	24 January 2016	Nové Město, Czech Republic	4 × 7.5 km Relay C/F	World Cup	1st	Sundby / Rundgreen / Krogh
9	2018–19	9 December 2018	Beitostølen, Norway	4 × 7.5 km Relay C/F	World Cup	1st	Iversen / Sundby / Krogh
10	2018–19	27 January 2019	Ulricehamn, Sweden	4 × 7.5 km Relay C/F	World Cup	3rd	Holund / Tønseth / Krüger
11	2019–20	8 December 2019	Lillehammer, Norway	4 × 7.5 km Relay C/F	World Cup	3rd	Golberg / Holund / Krogh
12	2019–20	1 March 2020	Lahti, Finland	4 × 7.5 km Relay C/F	World Cup	1st	Golberg / Holund / Klæbo
13	2020–21	24 January 2021	Lahti, Finland	4 × 7.5 km Relay C/F	World Cup	1st	Golberg / Iversen / Krüger
14	2022–23	5 February 2023	Toblach, Italy	4 × 7.5 km Relay C/F	World Cup	3rd	Tønseth / Krüger / Amundsen
