= Roger Aa Djupvik =

Norwegian cross-country skier (born 1981)

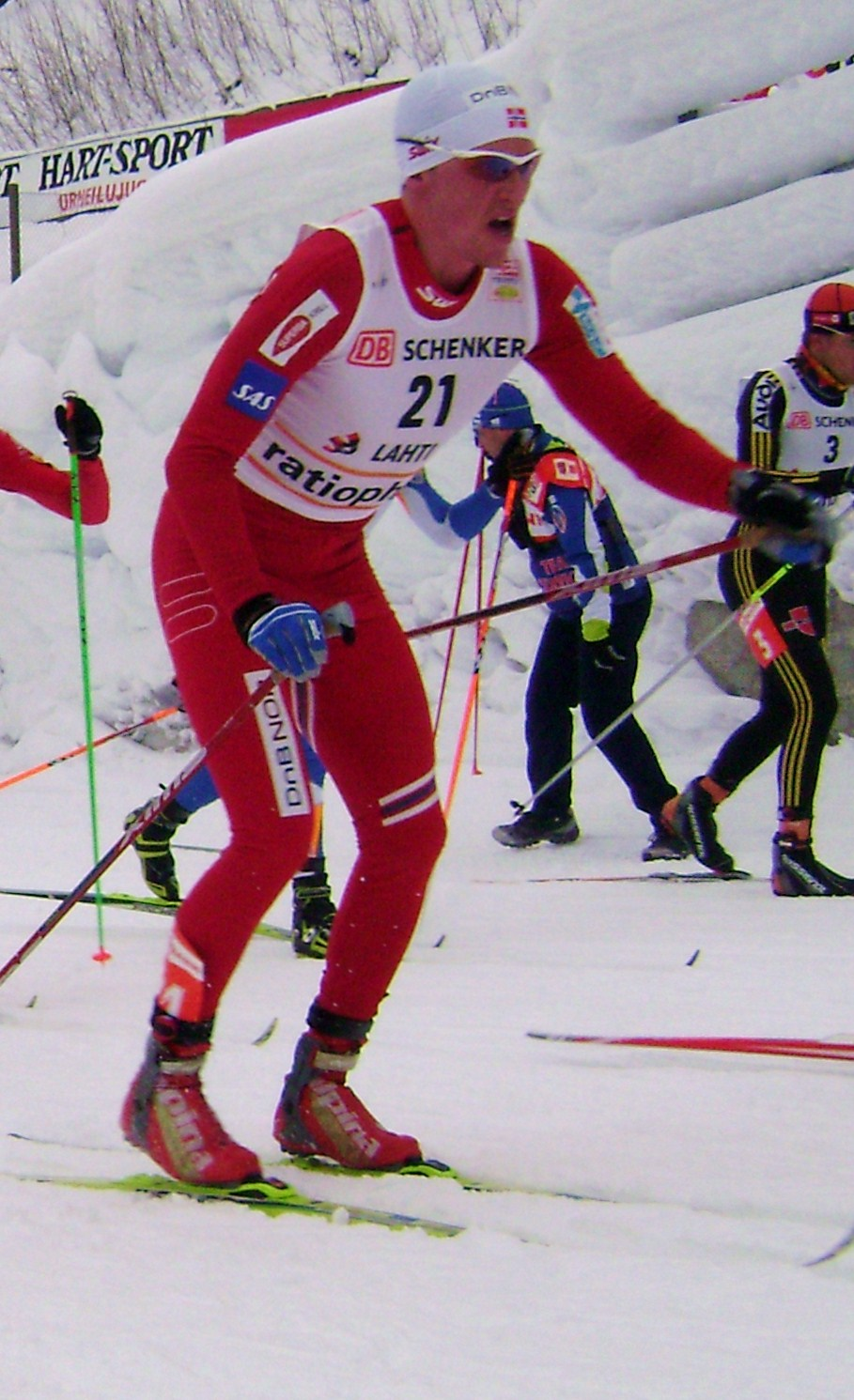
- Roger Aa Djupvik at 2010

Personal information
- Nationality: Norway
- Born: March 23, 1981 (age 45) Hyen, Norway

Sport
- Sport: Skiing
- Club: Lillehammer SK

World Cup career
- Seasons: 9 – (2002–2003, 2005–2007, 2009–2011, 2014)
- Indiv. starts: 40
- Indiv. podiums: 0
- Team starts: 6
- Team podiums: 1
- Team wins: 1
- Overall titles: 0 – (60th in 2007)
- Discipline titles: 0
Medal record
Men's cross-country skiing
Representing Norway
Junior World Championships
Bronze medal – third place	2000 Štrbské Pleso	4 × 10 km relay
Bronze medal – third place	2001 Karpacz	4 × 10 km relay

Roger Aa Djupvik (born March 23, 1981) is a Norwegian cross-country skier who has competed since 2000. His best World Cup finish was a win in a 4 × 10 km relay event in Finland in March 2010.

== Cross-country skiing results ==
All results are sourced from the International Ski Federation (FIS).

=== World Cup ===
==== Season standings ====
Season	Age	Discipline standings			Ski Tour standings		
Season	Age	Overall	Distance	Sprint	Nordic Opening	Tour de Ski	World Cup Final
2002	21	NC	—N/a	—	—N/a	—N/a	—N/a
2003	22	NC	—N/a	—	—N/a	—N/a	—N/a
2005	24	NC	NC	—	—N/a	—N/a	—N/a
2006	25	NC	NC	—	—N/a	—N/a	—N/a
2007	26	60	35	—	—N/a	—	—N/a
2009	28	107	77	NC	—N/a	—	25
2010	29	91	51	—	—N/a	DNF	—
2011	30	64	56	89	DNF	19	—
2014	33	NC	NC	—	—	—	—

==== Team podiums ====
- 1 victory – (1 RL)
- 1 podium – (1 RL)

No.	Season	Date	Location	Race	Level	Place	Teammates
1	2009–10	7 March 2010	Lahti, Finland	4 × 10 km Relay C/F	World Cup	1st	Østensen / Røthe / Rennemo
