= Laura Mononen =

Finnish cross-country skier

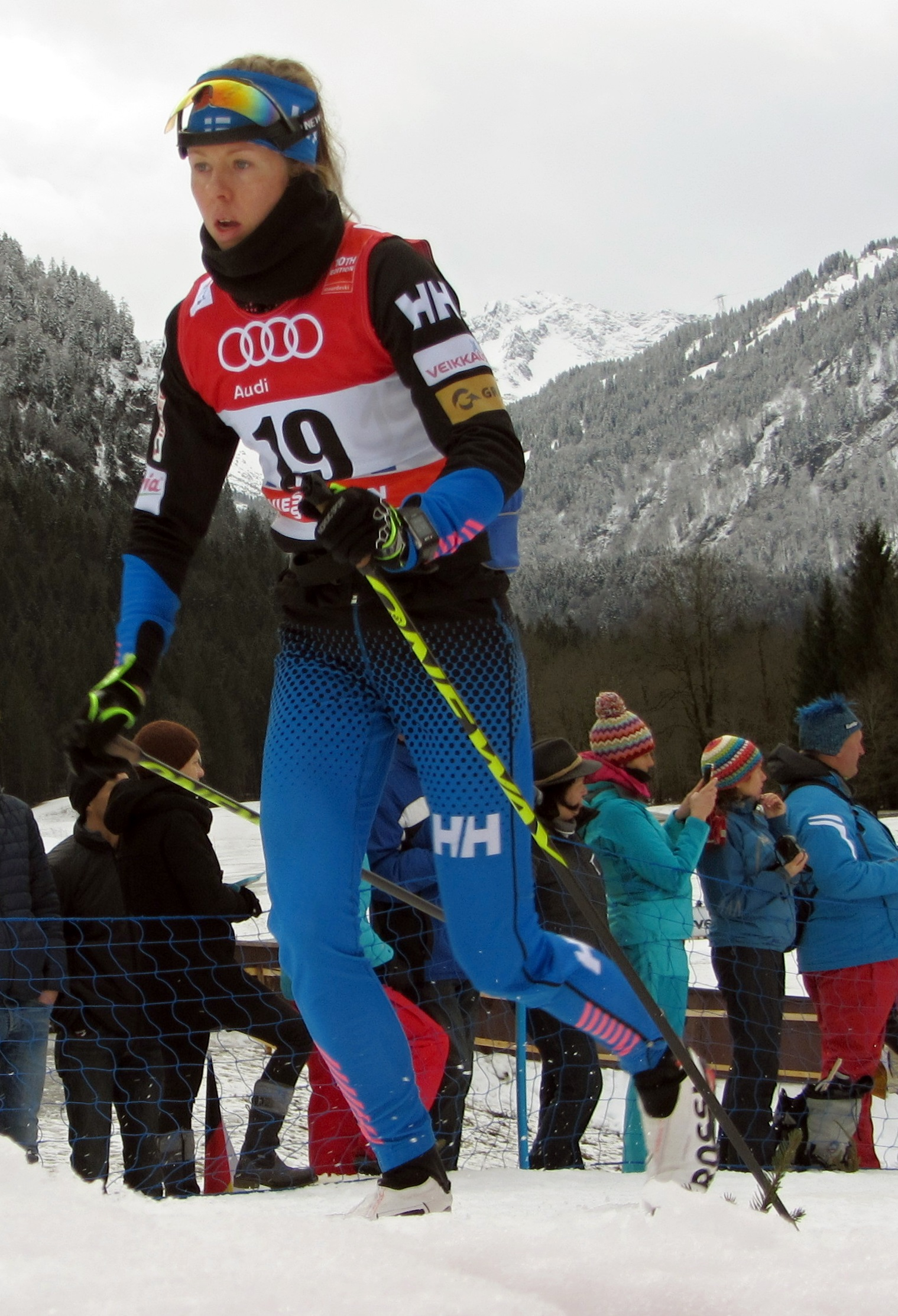

Personal information
- Full name: Laura Katariina Mononen
- Nationality: Finland
- Born: Laura Katariina Ahervo; 5 October 1984 Lohja, Finland

Sport
- Sport: Skiing
- Club: Hämeenlinnan Hiihtoseura

World Cup career
- Seasons: 13 – (2009–2021)
- Indiv. starts: 187
- Indiv. podiums: 1
- Indiv. wins: 0
- Team starts: 9
- Team podiums: 5
- Team wins: 0
- Overall titles: 0 – (10th in 2017)
- Discipline titles: 0
Medal record
Women's cross-country skiing
Representing Finland
World Championships
Bronze medal – third place	2017 Lahti	4 × 5 km relay
- Updated on 2 November 2021

Laura Katariina Mononen (née Ahervo, born 5 October 1984) is a retired Finnish cross-country skier.

== Career ==
Mononen made her debut in the World Cup in the 2008–09 season in March in Lahti, Finland.

Her top finish at the World Cup was in 2014–15 where she finished third in Toblach on 8 January 2015.

She announced her retirement from cross-country skiing in May 2021.

== Cross-country skiing results ==
All results are sourced from the International Ski Federation (FIS).

=== Olympic Games ===
Year	Age	10 km individual	15 km skiathlon	30 km mass start	Sprint	4 × 5 km relay	Team sprint
2018	33	23	19	—	—	—	—

=== World Championships ===
- 1 medal – (1 bronze)

Year	Age	10 km individual	15 km skiathlon	30 km mass start	Sprint	4 × 5 km relay	Team sprint
2015	30	34	—	—	—	—	—
2017	32	14	13	18	—	Bronze	—
2019	34	14	12	18	54	6	—
2021	36	—	20	—	—	—	—

=== World Cup ===
==== Season standings ====
Season	Age	Discipline standings			Ski Tour standings				
Season	Age	Overall	Distance	Sprint	Nordic Opening	Tour de Ski	Ski Tour 2020	World Cup Final	Ski Tour Canada
2009	24	NC	NC	—	—N/a	—	—N/a	—	—N/a
2010	25	NC	NC	—	—N/a	—	—N/a	—	—N/a
2011	26	NC	NC	NC	43	—	—N/a	—	—N/a
2012	27	45	32	67	28	20	—N/a	30	—N/a
2013	28	84	58	NC	35	30	—N/a	—	—N/a
2014	29	104	75	NC	45	DNF	—N/a	—	—N/a
2015	30	36	27	56	19	DNF	—N/a	—N/a	—N/a
2016	31	15	11	39	22	9	—N/a	—N/a	14
2017	32	10	9	34	9	12	—N/a	18	—N/a
2018	33	35	21	64	13	DNF	—N/a	DNF	—N/a
2019	34	30	23	68	30	11	—N/a	33	—N/a
2020	35	37	29	42	34	—	18	—N/a	—N/a
2021	36	50	37	NC	25	—	—N/a	—N/a	—N/a

==== Individual podiums ====
- 1 podium (1 SWC)

No.	Season	Date	Location	Race	Level	Place
1	2014–15	8 January 2015	Toblach, Italy	15 km Pursuit F	Stage World Cup	3rd

==== Team podiums ====
- 5 podiums – (5 RL)

No.	Season	Date	Location	Race	Level	Place	Teammates
1	2015–16	6 December 2015	Lillehammer, Norway	4 × 5 km Relay C/F	World Cup	2nd	Pärmäkoski / Niskanen / Kyllönen
2	2016–17	18 December 2016	La Clusaz, France	4 × 5 km Relay C/F	World Cup	2nd	Saarinen / Kyllönen / Roponen
3	2018–19	27 January 2019	Ulricehamn, Sweden	4 × 5 km Relay C/F	World Cup	3rd	Pärmäkoski / Roponen / Piippo
4	2019–20	1 March 2020	Lahti, Finland	4 × 5 km Relay C/F	World Cup	2nd	Matintalo / Niskanen / Pärmäkoski
5	2020–21	24 January 2021	Lahti, Finland	4 × 5 km Relay C/F	World Cup	3rd	Matintalo / Niskanen / Pärmäkoski
