= Åsunden, Västergötland =

Lake in Västergötland, Sweden

Åsunden
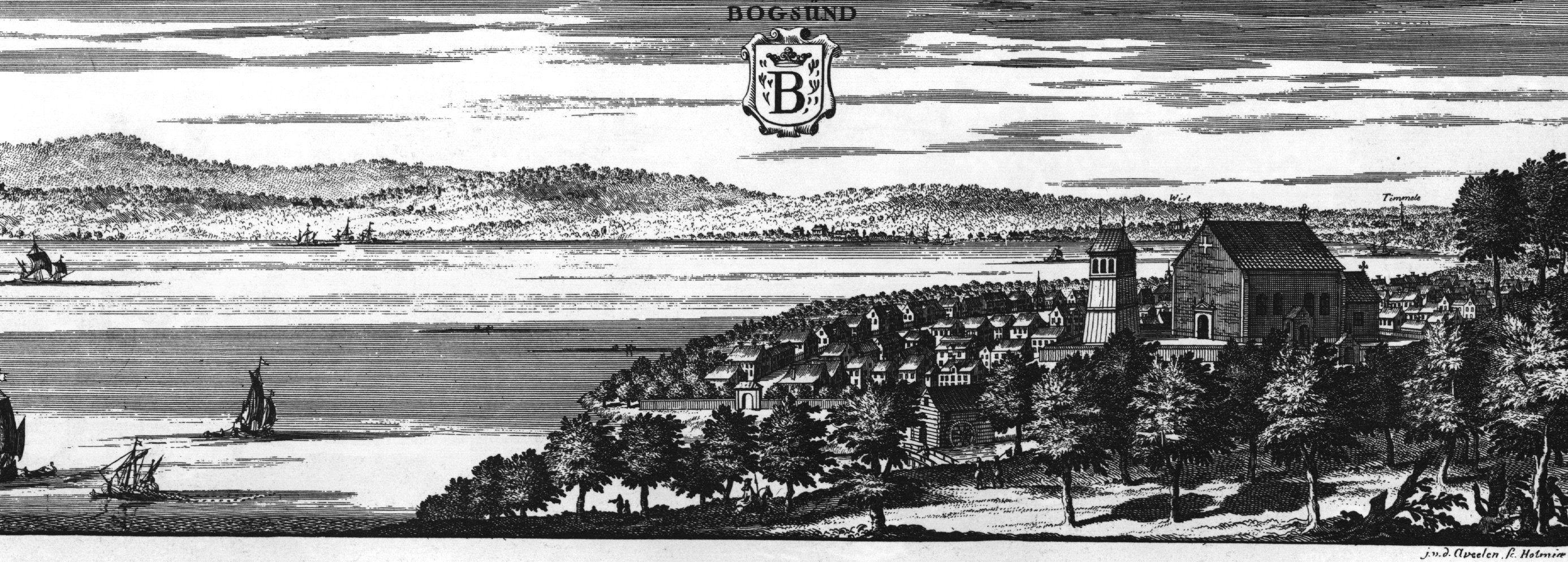
- Ulricehamn (then Bogesund) around 1700, viewed from the south. The lake on the left

- Location within Sweden
- Location: Västergötland
- Coordinates: 57°44′N 13°23.25′E
- Primary outflows: Ätran
- Basin countries: Sweden
- Surface area: 34 km^{2} (13 sq mi)
- Settlements: Ulricehamn

Åsunden (Swedish pronunciation: [ˈôːˌsɵnːdɛn]) is a lake in Västergötland, Sweden.

The lake is known from the Battle of Bogesund which took place on the ice and shore of the lake on 19 January 1520. Christian II of Denmark prevailed over the Swedish regent Sten Sture the Younger, who was mortally injured. Christian went on to be crowned King of Sweden later that year.
