= Janosch Brugger =

German cross-country skier (born 1997)

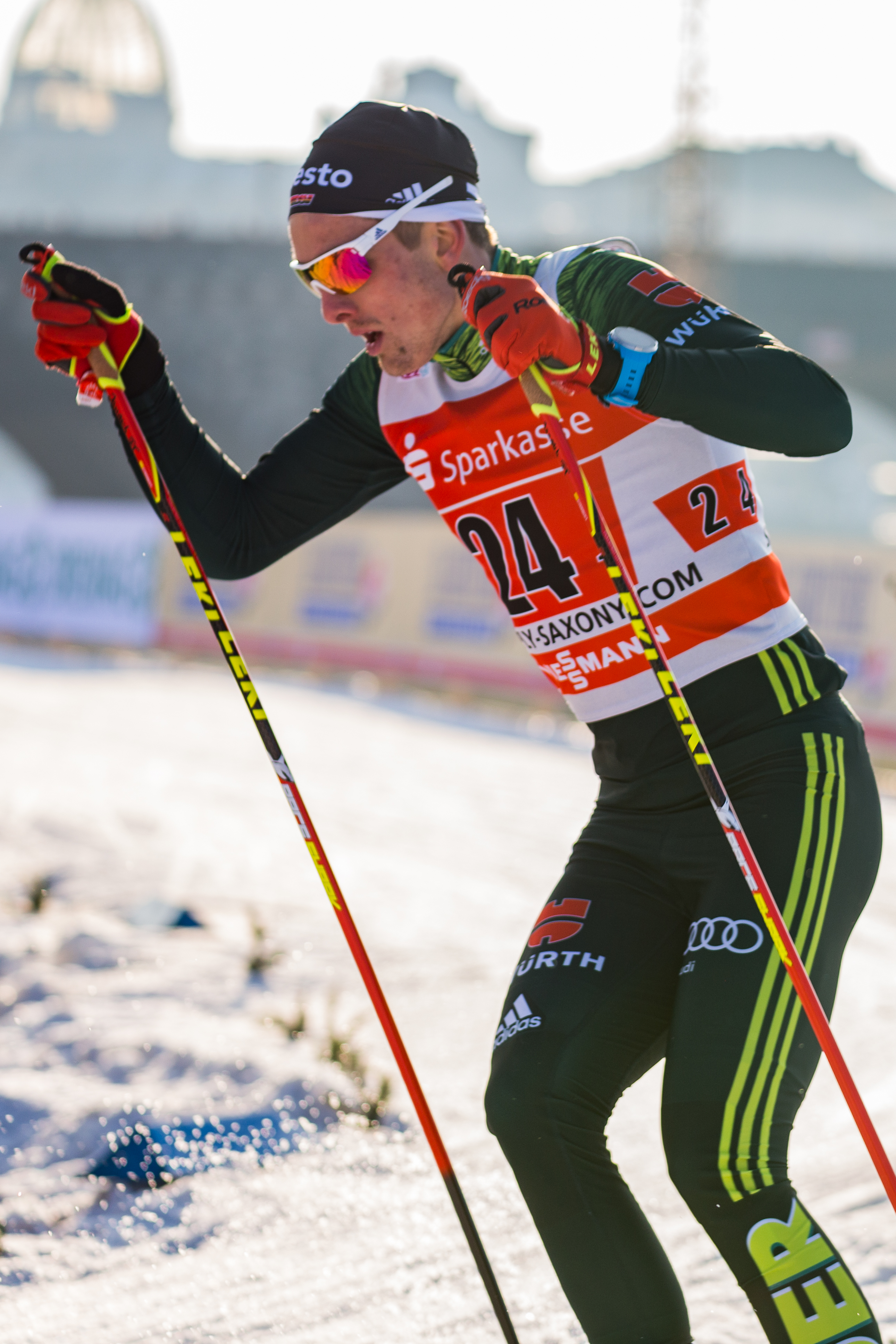

Personal information
- Nationality: Germany
- Born: 6 June 1997 (age 29) Titisee-Neustadt, Germany
- Height: 1.84 m (6 ft 0 in)

Sport
- Sport: Skiing
- Club: WSG Schluchsee

World Cup career
- Seasons: 7 – (2017–present)
- Indiv. starts: 78
- Indiv. podiums: 1
- Indiv. wins: 1
- Team starts: 12
- Team podiums: 0
- Overall titles: 0 – (37th in 2022)
- Discipline titles: 0
Medal record
Men's cross-country skiing
Representing Germany
World Championships
Bronze medal – third place	2023 Planica	4 × 10 km relay
Junior World Championships
Gold medal – first place	2017 Park City	Individual sprint
- Updated on 29 March 2023

Janosch Brugger (born 6 June 1997) is a German cross-country skier.

He participated at the FIS Nordic World Ski Championships 2019.

== Cross-country skiing results ==
All results are sourced from the International Ski Federation (FIS).

=== Olympic Games ===
Year	Age	15 km individual	30 km skiathlon	50 km mass start	Sprint	4 × 10 km relay	Team sprint
2022	24	20	—	—^{[a]}	38	5	23

^{a} Distance reduced to 30 km due to weather conditions.

=== World Championships ===
- 1 medal – (1 bronze)

Year	Age	15 km individual	30 km skiathlon	50 km mass start	Sprint	4 × 10 km relay	Team sprint
2019	21	18	—	—	41	—	14
2021	23	—	—	39	29	7	12
2023	25	31	—	—	30	Bronze	7
2025	27	37	—	—	—	8	—

=== World Cup ===
==== Season standings ====
Season	Age	Discipline standings				Ski Tour standings			
Season	Age	Overall	Distance	Sprint	U23	Nordic Opening	Tour de Ski	Ski Tour 2020	World Cup Final
2017	19	NC	—	NC	NC	—	—	—N/a	—
2018	20	133	86	NC	23	—	DNF	—N/a	—
2019	21	61	43	86	10	17	DNF	—N/a	47
2020	22	NC	NC	NC	NC	40	DNF	—	—N/a
2021	23	43	38	43	—N/a	—	30	—N/a	—N/a
2022	24	37	35	43	—N/a	—N/a	19	—N/a	—N/a
2023	25	68	40	93	—N/a	—N/a	DNF	—N/a	—N/a

==== Individual podiums ====
- 1 victory – (1 SWC)
- 1 podium – (1 SWC)

No.	Season	Date	Location	Race	Level	Place
1	2018–19	2 December 2018	Lillehammer, Norway	15 km Pursuit C	Stage World Cup	1st
