= Sindre Bjørnestad Skar =

Norwegian cross-country skier

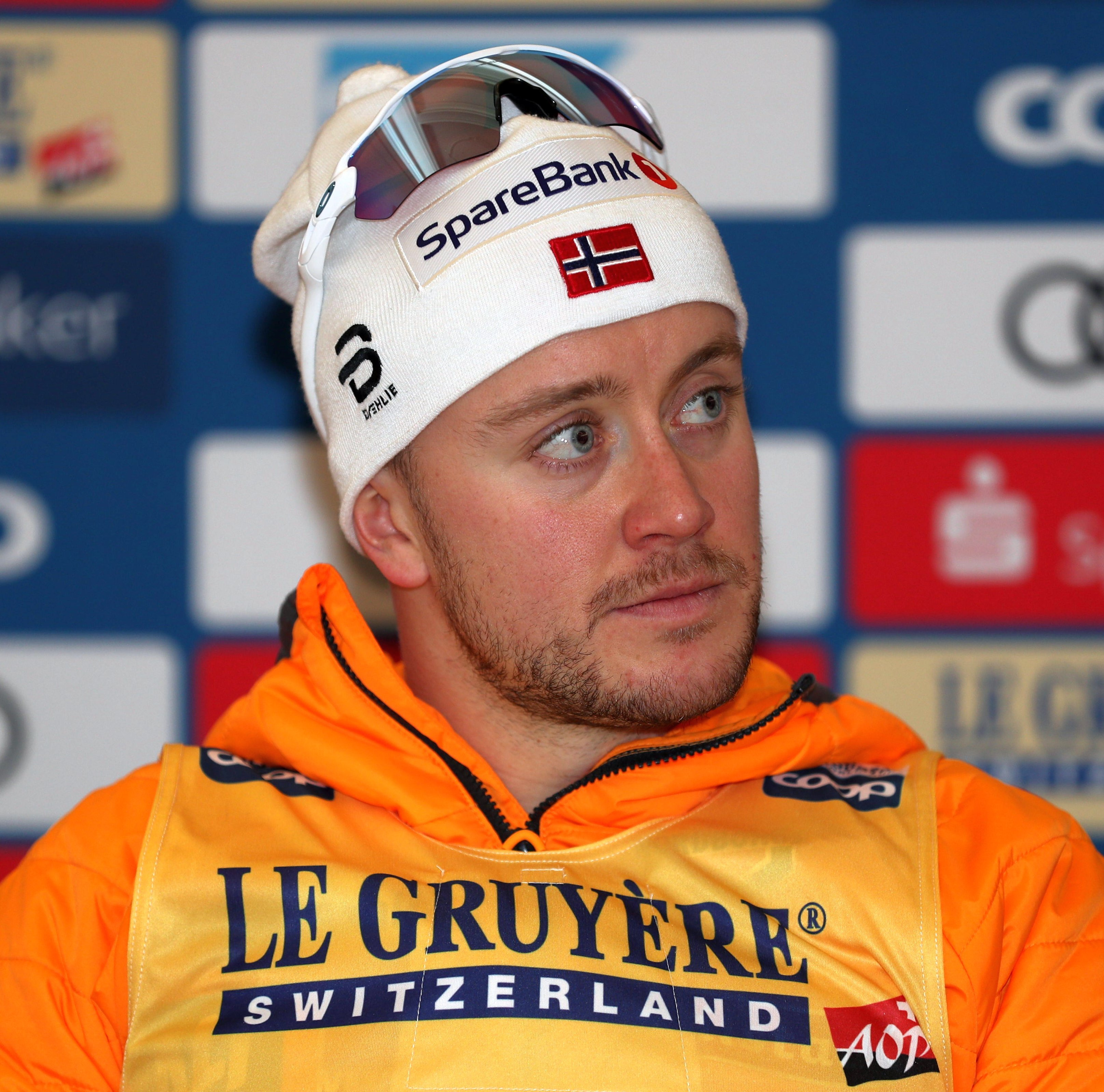
- Bjørnestad Skar in 2019

Personal information
- Nationality: Norway
- Born: 22 January 1992 (age 34)

Sport
- Sport: Skiing
- Club: Bærums Verk og Hauger IF

World Cup career
- Seasons: 13 – (2011–present)
- Indiv. starts: 98
- Indiv. podiums: 12
- Indiv. wins: 2
- Team starts: 11
- Team podiums: 5
- Team wins: 2
- Overall titles: 0 – (11th in 2019)
- Discipline titles: 0
Medal record
Men's cross-country skiing
Representing Norway
U23 World Championships
Silver medal – second place	2015 Almaty	Individual sprint
Junior World Championships
Gold medal – first place	2011 Otepää	10 km freestyle
Gold medal – first place	2011 Otepää	4 × 5 km relay
Silver medal – second place	2012 Erzurum	Individual sprint
Bronze medal – third place	2012 Erzurum	20 km skiathlon
Bronze medal – third place	2012 Erzurum	10 km classical
Bronze medal – third place	2012 Erzurum	4 × 5 km relay
- Updated on 28 March 2023

Sindre Bjørnestad Skar (born 22 January 1992) is a Norwegian cross-country skier.

At the 2011 Junior World Championships he won two gold medals, one in relay and one in 10 km. He then took one silver and three bronze medals at the 2012 Junior World Championships. He made his FIS Cross-Country World Cup debut in February 2011 in Drammen, where he also collected his first World Cup points with a 28th place finish. He later took his first top-10 placement with a tenth place in Lahti in March 2013.

He represents the sports club Bærums Verk IF.

== Cross-country skiing results ==
All results are sourced from the International Ski Federation (FIS).

=== World Championships ===
Year	Age	15 km individual	30 km skiathlon	50 km mass start	Sprint	4 × 10 km relay	Team sprint
2017	25	—	—	—	13	—	—
2019	27	—	—	—	7	—	—

=== World Cup ===
==== Season standings ====
Season	Age	Discipline standings				Ski Tour standings				
Season	Age	Overall	Distance	Sprint	U23	Nordic Opening	Tour de Ski	Ski Tour 2020	World Cup Final	Ski Tour Canada
2011	19	169	—	107	—N/a	—	—	—N/a	—	—N/a
2012	20	NC	NC	NC	—N/a	—	—	—N/a	—	—N/a
2013	21	111	NC	61	—N/a	—	—	—N/a	—	—N/a
2014	22	107	103	58	—N/a	—	—	—N/a	—	—N/a
2015	23	56	NC	19	5	—	—	—N/a	—N/a	—N/a
2016	24	55	—	21	—N/a	—	—	—N/a	—N/a	—
2017	25	16	54	3rd place, bronze medalist(s)	—N/a	—	—	—N/a	4	—N/a
2018	26	29	36	11	—N/a	—	DNF	—N/a	27	—N/a
2019	27	11	33	4	—N/a	23	DNF	—N/a	9	—N/a
2020	28	24	48	10	—N/a	16	—	—	—N/a	—N/a
2021	29	40	52	25	—N/a	11	—	—N/a	—N/a	—N/a
2022	30	39	—	14	—N/a	—N/a	—	—N/a	—N/a	—N/a
2023	31	20	69	11	—N/a	—N/a	17	—N/a	—N/a	—N/a

==== Individual podiums ====
- 2 victories – (2 WC)
- 12 podiums – (8 WC, 4 SWC)

No.	Season	Date	Location	Race	Level	Place
1	2014–15	7 March 2015	Lahti, Finland	1.5 km Sprint F	World Cup	2nd
2	2016–17	11 December 2016	Davos, Switzerland	1.6 km Sprint F	World Cup	3rd
3	2016–17	14 January 2017	Toblach, Italy	1.3 km Sprint F	World Cup	1st
4	2016–17	28 January 2017	Falun, Sweden	1.4 km Sprint F	World Cup	3rd
5	2017–18	4 January 2018	Oberstdorf, Germany	15 km Mass Start F	Stage World Cup	2nd
6	2018–19	12 January 2019	Dresden, Germany	1.6 km Sprint F	World Cup	1st
7	2018–19	16 March 2019	Falun, Sweden	1.4 km Sprint F	World Cup	3rd
8	2018–19	22 March 2019	Quebec City, Canada	1.6 km Sprint F	Stage World Cup	3rd
9	2019–20	11 January 2020	Dresden, Germany	1.3 km Sprint F	World Cup	2nd
10	2021–22	26 February 2022	Lahti, Finland	1.6 km Sprint F	World Cup	3rd
11	2022–23	31 December 2022	Val Müstair, Switzerland	1.5 km Sprint F	World Cup	3rd
12	2022–23	4 January 2023	Oberstdorf, Germany	20 km Pursuit F	Stage World Cup	2nd

==== Team podiums ====
- 2 victories – (2 TS)
- 5 podiums – (5 TS)

No.	Season	Date	Location	Race	Level	Place	Teammate
1	2018–19	13 January 2019	Dresden, Germany	6 × 1.6 km Team Sprint F	World Cup	1st	Valnes
2	2018–19	10 February 2019	Lahti, Finland	6 × 1.6 km Team Sprint C	World Cup	2nd	Brandsdal
3	2019–20	22 December 2019	Planica, Slovenia	6 × 1.2 km Team Sprint F	World Cup	1st	Valnes
4	2021–22	19 December 2021	Dresden, Germany	12 × 0.65 km Team Sprint F	World Cup	2nd	Taugbøl
5	2022–23	24 March 2023	Lahti, Finland	6 × 1.4 km Team Sprint F	World Cup	3rd	Amundsen
