= Ulricehamn =

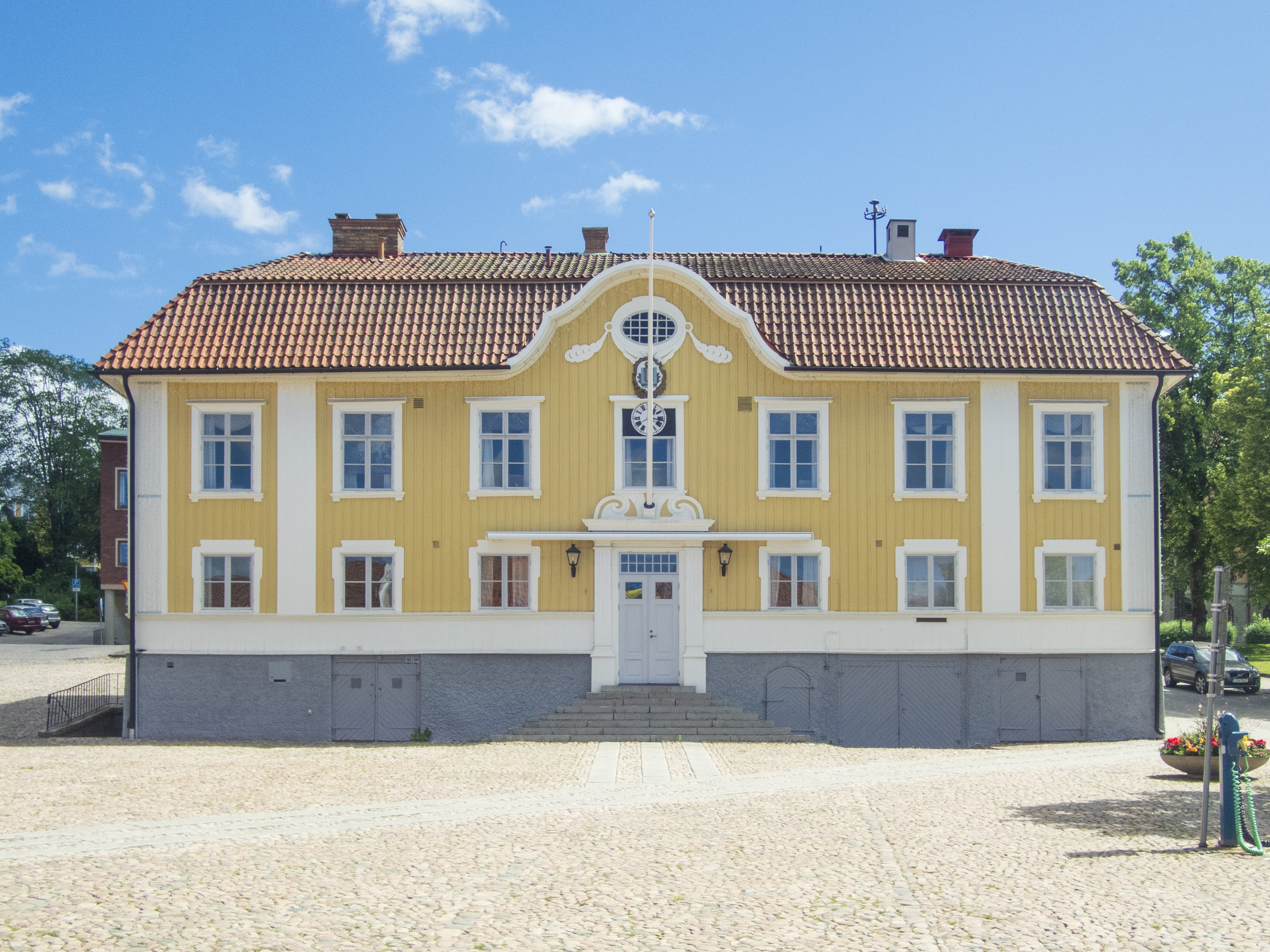
- The town hall of Ulricehamn

- Location within Västra Götaland Location within Sweden
- Coordinates: 57°47′N 13°25′E
- Country: Sweden
- Province: Västergötland
- County: Västra Götaland County
- Municipality: Ulricehamn Municipality

Area
  - Total: 6.23 km^{2} (2.41 sq mi)

Population (31 December 2010)
  - Total: 9,787
  - Density: 1,571/km^{2} (4,070/sq mi)
- Time zone: UTC+1 (CET)
  - Summer (DST): UTC+2 (CEST)
- Climate: Dfb

Ulricehamn is a locality and the seat of Ulricehamn Municipality, Västra Götaland County, Sweden, with 9,787 inhabitants in 2010.

== History ==
Ulricehamn, originally known as Bogesund, has been populated at least since the Middle Ages. The town has had city privileges since at least the 15th century. There are still several old buildings from the 17th and 18th century and the picturesque main street Storgatan has existed in its present form for centuries. Among other historical structures, there is the city hall, located at the market square, a yellowish rococo building from 1789.

The town is situated on Ätranstigen ("The Ätran path"), a trail following the river Ätran, stretching from the Kattegat strait in the west an inwards the country, connecting with other roads leading eventually to the eastern cities Sigtuna and Uppsala. In 1520, the Battle of Bogesund took place on the ice of the lake Åsunden.

In 1741, it was renamed Ulricehamn in honour of Queen Ulrica Eleonora. Following a fire in 1788 it encountered a recession, but several textile industries were established in the 19th century. Together with its first railroad in 1874 the town's importance as a center of trade increased.

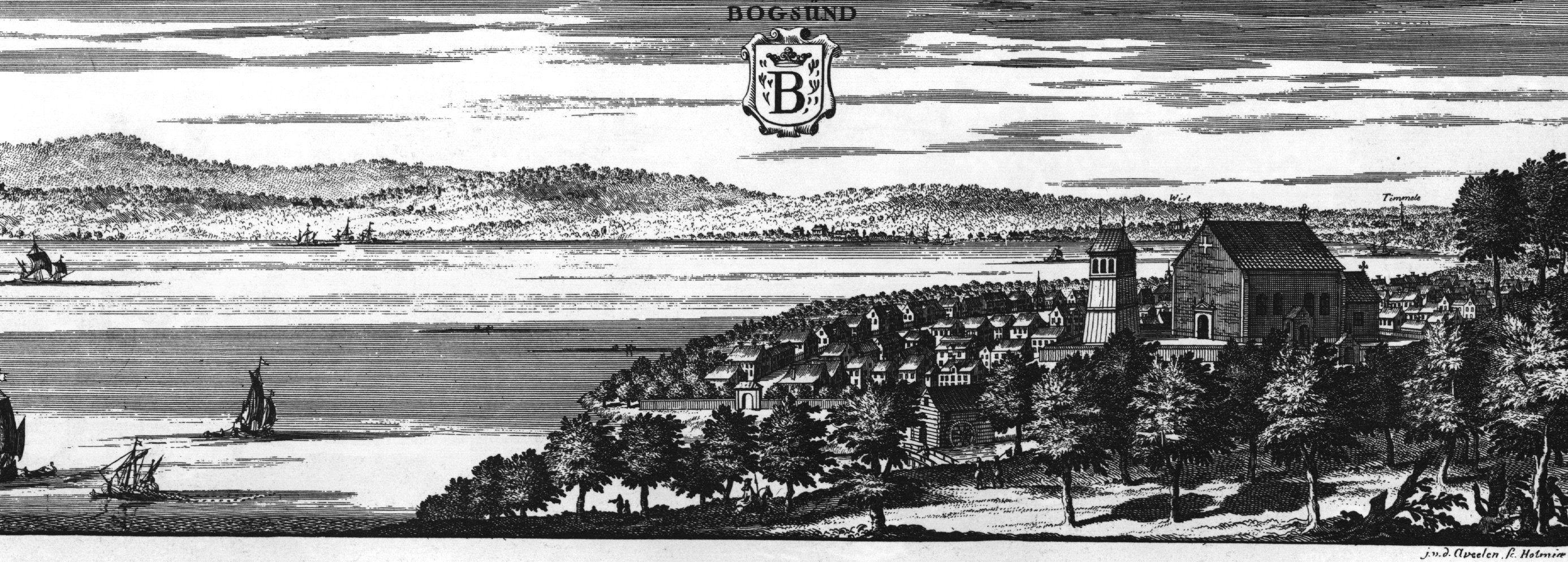
Ulricehamn (then Bogesund) around 1700, viewed from the south. Lake Åsunden on the left. From Suecia antiqua et hodierna.

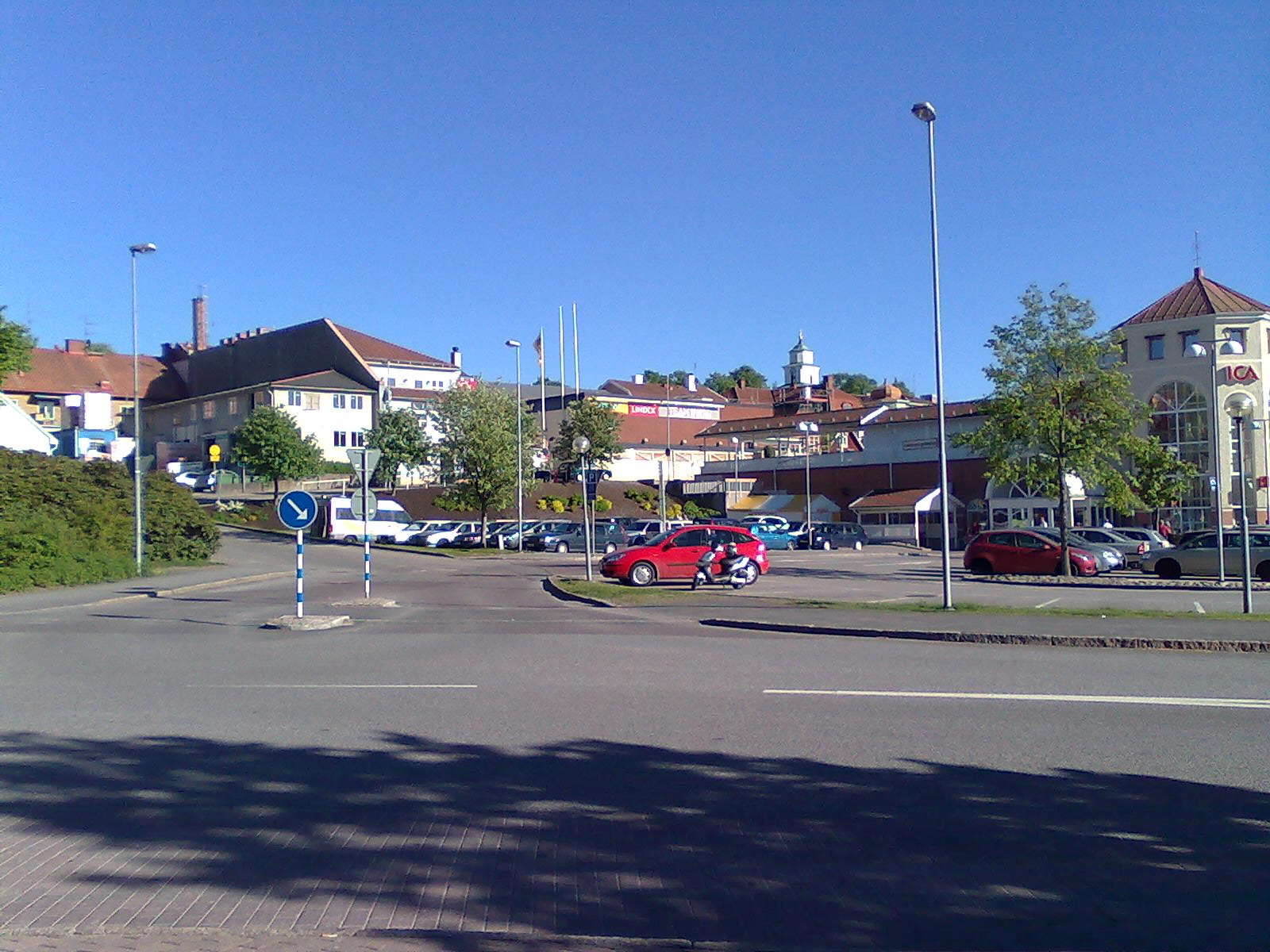
Rådmansgränd at the crossing with Strandgatan in Ulricehamn. To the right, the church of Ulricehamn can be seen.

== Geography ==
The town is located on the slopes of a lakeside, where the river Ätran flows into lake Åsunden. The geography is signified by the scenic nature of trees and water, which offers popular activities such as bicycling, inlining and boat trips.

== Climate ==
Ulricehamn has a transitional climate between maritime (Cfb) and humid continental (Dfb) on the Köppen climate classification. The climate in Ulricehamn differs slightly from surrounding areas. Situated on the slopes on the south side of Lake Åsunden it reaches up to 350 m.a.s.l. making the climate considerably colder than low-lying cities on the plains somewhat further north. Annual temperature in altitudes over 300m is further cooler in winter compared to data, since the weather station is located 180 m.a.s.l. During wintertime, Ulricehamn has become something of a skiing centre for the southwestern parts of Sweden. For alpine skiing, there are 7 lifts and 6 slopes; while for cross-country skiing there are some 25 kilometers of prepared courses. The town centre on the lake is less likely to build up a snow cover due to the milder weather.

Being in the interior but also influenced by maritime westerlies, the summers closely resemble coastal locations to its west due to its elevation and more frequent cloud cover. Similar to other parts of southwestern Sweden, a lot of winter precipitation falls as rain due to the low-pressure systems originating over the warm waters of the North Atlantic. The weather station was set up in the 19th century, but closed after 2021.

Climate data for Ulricehamn, 175 m asl, 2002–2021 averages (extremes since 1901)
Month	Jan	Feb	Mar	Apr	May	Jun	Jul	Aug	Sep	Oct	Nov	Dec	Year
Record high °C (°F)	9.6 (49.3)	16.2 (61.2)	19.7 (67.5)	27.6 (81.7)	30.0 (86.0)	34.0 (93.2)	34.4 (93.9)	33.0 (91.4)	28.0 (82.4)	22.0 (71.6)	15.1 (59.2)	11.1 (52.0)	34.4 (93.9)
Mean maximum °C (°F)	6.5 (43.7)	7.8 (46.0)	13.2 (55.8)	19.7 (67.5)	25.1 (77.2)	27.8 (82.0)	29.1 (84.4)	27.4 (81.3)	22.6 (72.7)	16.1 (61.0)	11.0 (51.8)	7.6 (45.7)	30.0 (86.0)
Mean daily maximum °C (°F)	0.7 (33.3)	1.5 (34.7)	5.6 (42.1)	11.8 (53.2)	16.8 (62.2)	20.4 (68.7)	22.3 (72.1)	20.8 (69.4)	16.8 (62.2)	10.5 (50.9)	5.7 (42.3)	2.4 (36.3)	11.3 (52.3)
Daily mean °C (°F)	−1.8 (28.8)	−1.5 (29.3)	1.4 (34.5)	6.3 (43.3)	11.2 (52.2)	15.0 (59.0)	17.2 (63.0)	16.1 (61.0)	12.4 (54.3)	7.2 (45.0)	3.3 (37.9)	0.2 (32.4)	7.3 (45.1)
Mean daily minimum °C (°F)	−4.2 (24.4)	−4.4 (24.1)	−2.9 (26.8)	0.8 (33.4)	5.6 (42.1)	9.5 (49.1)	12.1 (53.8)	11.4 (52.5)	8.0 (46.4)	3.8 (38.8)	0.9 (33.6)	−2.1 (28.2)	3.2 (37.8)
Mean minimum °C (°F)	−15.7 (3.7)	−14.5 (5.9)	−11.7 (10.9)	−6.0 (21.2)	−1.8 (28.8)	3.0 (37.4)	6.4 (43.5)	4.6 (40.3)	0.0 (32.0)	−4.7 (23.5)	−8.6 (16.5)	−12.2 (10.0)	−18.9 (−2.0)
Record low °C (°F)	−28.6 (−19.5)	−25.6 (−14.1)	−22.5 (−8.5)	−16.2 (2.8)	−8.0 (17.6)	−2.1 (28.2)	2.2 (36.0)	−0.1 (31.8)	−4.0 (24.8)	−12.2 (10.0)	−16.2 (2.8)	−23.2 (−9.8)	−28.6 (−19.5)
Average precipitation mm (inches)	75.6 (2.98)	58.7 (2.31)	48.9 (1.93)	37.5 (1.48)	59.6 (2.35)	80.4 (3.17)	90.9 (3.58)	102.4 (4.03)	74.6 (2.94)	83.4 (3.28)	83.8 (3.30)	85.7 (3.37)	881.5 (34.72)
Source 1: SMHI Open Data for Ulricehamn, temperature
Source 2: SMHI Open Data for Ulricehamn, precipitation
